= List of minor planets: 466001–467000 =

The following is a partial list of minor planets, running from minor-planet number 466001 through 467000, inclusive. The primary data for this and other partial lists is based on JPL's "Small-Body Orbital Elements" and data available from the Minor Planet Center. Critical list information is also provided by the MPC, unless otherwise specified from Lowell Observatory. A detailed description of the table's columns and additional sources are given on the main page including a complete list of every page in this series, and a statistical break-up on the dynamical classification of minor planets.

Also see the summary list of all named bodies in numerical and alphabetical order, and the corresponding naming citations for the number range of this particular list. New namings may only be added to this list after official publication, as the preannouncement of names is condemned by the Working Group for Small Bodies Nomenclature of the International Astronomical Union.

Near-Earth obj.	MBA (inner)	MBA (outer)	Centaur
Mars-crosser	MBA (middle)	Jupiter trojan	Trans-Neptunian obj.
Unclassified

== 466001–466100 ==
Designation			Discovery			Properties		Ref
Permanent	Provisional	Named after	Date	Site	Discoverer(s)	Category	Diam.	Ref
466001	2011 FB_{84}	—	May 5, 2006	Mount Lemmon	Mount Lemmon Survey	·	3.8 km	MPC · JPL
466002	2011 FJ_{106}	—	October 8, 2008	Mount Lemmon	Mount Lemmon Survey	·	2.3 km	MPC · JPL
466003	2011 FJ_{146}	—	February 13, 2011	Mount Lemmon	Mount Lemmon Survey	·	3.4 km	MPC · JPL
466004	2011 GZ_{1}	—	March 3, 2010	WISE	WISE	·	2.6 km	MPC · JPL
466005	2011 GB_{4}	—	April 24, 2006	Kitt Peak	Spacewatch	·	1.7 km	MPC · JPL
466006	2011 GM_{13}	—	May 23, 2006	Kitt Peak	Spacewatch	·	2.6 km	MPC · JPL
466007	2011 GQ_{27}	—	November 25, 2009	Kitt Peak	Spacewatch	·	1.8 km	MPC · JPL
466008	2011 GE_{29}	—	April 30, 2006	Kitt Peak	Spacewatch	HYG	2.5 km	MPC · JPL
466009	2011 GW_{30}	—	April 1, 2011	Kitt Peak	Spacewatch	·	1.8 km	MPC · JPL
466010	2011 GO_{42}	—	September 7, 2008	Mount Lemmon	Mount Lemmon Survey	MRX	1.0 km	MPC · JPL
466011	2011 GT_{45}	—	September 16, 2009	Mount Lemmon	Mount Lemmon Survey	·	1.6 km	MPC · JPL
466012	2011 GQ_{56}	—	January 8, 2010	Mount Lemmon	Mount Lemmon Survey	·	2.4 km	MPC · JPL
466013	2011 GE_{73}	—	April 7, 2006	Kitt Peak	Spacewatch	·	1.9 km	MPC · JPL
466014	2011 GN_{79}	—	March 13, 2011	Mount Lemmon	Mount Lemmon Survey	·	1.8 km	MPC · JPL
466015	2011 GA_{83}	—	May 2, 2006	Mount Lemmon	Mount Lemmon Survey	·	3.7 km	MPC · JPL
466016	2011 GB_{83}	—	October 25, 2008	Mount Lemmon	Mount Lemmon Survey	EOS	2.1 km	MPC · JPL
466017	2011 HW_{1}	—	January 28, 2006	Kitt Peak	Spacewatch	·	1.7 km	MPC · JPL
466018	2011 HR_{21}	—	July 16, 2007	Siding Spring	SSS	·	2.8 km	MPC · JPL
466019	2011 HF_{30}	—	April 26, 2000	Kitt Peak	Spacewatch	·	2.9 km	MPC · JPL
466020	2011 HQ_{35}	—	April 27, 2011	Kitt Peak	Spacewatch	EOS	2.3 km	MPC · JPL
466021	2011 HD_{41}	—	April 26, 2011	Kitt Peak	Spacewatch	EOS	1.8 km	MPC · JPL
466022	2011 HQ_{55}	—	March 4, 2005	Mount Lemmon	Mount Lemmon Survey	·	2.3 km	MPC · JPL
466023	2011 HL_{57}	—	March 15, 2005	Catalina	CSS	·	3.4 km	MPC · JPL
466024	2011 HJ_{71}	—	April 6, 2011	Mount Lemmon	Mount Lemmon Survey	·	2.4 km	MPC · JPL
466025	2011 HW_{80}	—	March 10, 2005	Mount Lemmon	Mount Lemmon Survey	·	2.7 km	MPC · JPL
466026	2011 HA_{81}	—	October 16, 2009	Catalina	CSS	H	520 m	MPC · JPL
466027	2011 HV_{82}	—	March 12, 2011	Mount Lemmon	Mount Lemmon Survey	·	3.0 km	MPC · JPL
466028	2011 HJ_{84}	—	April 25, 2006	Catalina	CSS	·	2.1 km	MPC · JPL
466029	2011 HO_{90}	—	March 27, 2011	Mount Lemmon	Mount Lemmon Survey	·	1.6 km	MPC · JPL
466030	2011 HJ_{94}	—	February 14, 2010	Mount Lemmon	Mount Lemmon Survey	·	2.5 km	MPC · JPL
466031	2011 HL_{96}	—	February 15, 2010	Mount Lemmon	Mount Lemmon Survey	·	2.6 km	MPC · JPL
466032	2011 HE_{101}	—	May 10, 2010	WISE	WISE	·	2.7 km	MPC · JPL
466033	2011 HA_{103}	—	January 7, 2010	Mount Lemmon	Mount Lemmon Survey	·	2.0 km	MPC · JPL
466034	2011 JC_{13}	—	May 7, 2011	Kitt Peak	Spacewatch	·	1.6 km	MPC · JPL
466035	2011 JL_{13}	—	May 30, 2006	Kitt Peak	Spacewatch	·	2.4 km	MPC · JPL
466036	2011 JQ_{14}	—	April 30, 2011	Kitt Peak	Spacewatch	·	4.9 km	MPC · JPL
466037	2011 JR_{18}	—	December 3, 2008	Catalina	CSS	·	3.7 km	MPC · JPL
466038	2011 JV_{31}	—	April 27, 2010	WISE	WISE	T_{j} (2.95)	3.5 km	MPC · JPL
466039	2011 KG	—	December 2, 1999	Kitt Peak	Spacewatch	H	420 m	MPC · JPL
466040	2011 KB_{16}	—	May 22, 2011	Mount Lemmon	Mount Lemmon Survey	EOS	1.7 km	MPC · JPL
466041	2011 KX_{21}	—	September 13, 2007	Mount Lemmon	Mount Lemmon Survey	EOS	1.7 km	MPC · JPL
466042	2011 KM_{26}	—	September 13, 2007	Kitt Peak	Spacewatch	·	2.3 km	MPC · JPL
466043	2011 KK_{30}	—	April 16, 2010	WISE	WISE	·	5.2 km	MPC · JPL
466044	2011 KY_{37}	—	February 15, 2010	Mount Lemmon	Mount Lemmon Survey	·	2.2 km	MPC · JPL
466045	2011 LY_{13}	—	October 8, 2007	Mount Lemmon	Mount Lemmon Survey	TIR	2.5 km	MPC · JPL
466046	2011 LN_{14}	—	May 1, 2011	Kitt Peak	Spacewatch	·	2.5 km	MPC · JPL
466047	2011 LE_{15}	—	May 20, 2010	WISE	WISE	·	4.2 km	MPC · JPL
466048	2011 LV_{21}	—	April 26, 2011	Kitt Peak	Spacewatch	·	1.7 km	MPC · JPL
466049	2011 LY_{21}	—	February 1, 2005	Kitt Peak	Spacewatch	·	2.3 km	MPC · JPL
466050	2011 OQ_{19}	—	June 18, 2010	WISE	WISE	·	3.5 km	MPC · JPL
466051	2011 OG_{49}	—	July 28, 2011	Siding Spring	SSS	·	3.2 km	MPC · JPL
466052	2011 PX_{4}	—	March 3, 2009	Mount Lemmon	Mount Lemmon Survey	·	3.6 km	MPC · JPL
466053	2011 QF_{23}	—	August 26, 2011	Socorro	LINEAR	AMO	540 m	MPC · JPL
466054	2011 QN_{94}	—	March 20, 2010	Kitt Peak	Spacewatch	·	2.1 km	MPC · JPL
466055	2011 QQ_{98}	—	October 21, 2006	Mount Lemmon	Mount Lemmon Survey	·	3.6 km	MPC · JPL
466056	2011 SL_{57}	—	September 23, 2011	Mount Lemmon	Mount Lemmon Survey	·	520 m	MPC · JPL
466057	2011 SJ_{104}	—	September 23, 2011	Kitt Peak	Spacewatch	·	980 m	MPC · JPL
466058	2011 SF_{211}	—	September 15, 2004	Anderson Mesa	LONEOS	PHO	2.9 km	MPC · JPL
466059	2011 SD_{215}	—	September 21, 2011	Kitt Peak	Spacewatch	·	670 m	MPC · JPL
466060	2011 TN_{3}	—	November 22, 2008	Kitt Peak	Spacewatch	·	570 m	MPC · JPL
466061	2011 UQ_{97}	—	October 21, 2008	Kitt Peak	Spacewatch	·	560 m	MPC · JPL
466062	2011 UT_{103}	—	October 20, 2011	Mount Lemmon	Mount Lemmon Survey	·	570 m	MPC · JPL
466063	2011 UG_{191}	—	October 19, 2011	Mount Lemmon	Mount Lemmon Survey	·	600 m	MPC · JPL
466064	2011 UM_{197}	—	February 2, 2009	Catalina	CSS	·	660 m	MPC · JPL
466065	2011 UH_{276}	—	January 21, 2006	Kitt Peak	Spacewatch	·	560 m	MPC · JPL
466066	2011 UB_{296}	—	December 22, 2008	Mount Lemmon	Mount Lemmon Survey	·	510 m	MPC · JPL
466067	2011 WB_{73}	—	November 26, 2011	Haleakala	Pan-STARRS 1	·	710 m	MPC · JPL
466068	2011 WB_{98}	—	December 30, 2008	Mount Lemmon	Mount Lemmon Survey	·	540 m	MPC · JPL
466069	2011 WC_{106}	—	March 9, 2006	Mount Lemmon	Mount Lemmon Survey	·	720 m	MPC · JPL
466070	2011 WC_{136}	—	October 7, 2010	Catalina	CSS	T_{j} (2.97) · 3:2	5.8 km	MPC · JPL
466071	2011 WV_{145}	—	November 11, 2004	Kitt Peak	Spacewatch	·	540 m	MPC · JPL
466072	2011 YF_{10}	—	November 28, 2011	Mount Lemmon	Mount Lemmon Survey	·	740 m	MPC · JPL
466073	2011 YA_{20}	—	September 14, 2007	Mount Lemmon	Mount Lemmon Survey	·	630 m	MPC · JPL
466074	2011 YZ_{24}	—	December 25, 2011	Kitt Peak	Spacewatch	·	1.1 km	MPC · JPL
466075	2011 YM_{34}	—	August 13, 2010	Kitt Peak	Spacewatch	V	560 m	MPC · JPL
466076	2011 YT_{49}	—	December 30, 2011	Mount Lemmon	Mount Lemmon Survey	·	800 m	MPC · JPL
466077	2011 YA_{58}	—	November 8, 2007	Kitt Peak	Spacewatch	·	890 m	MPC · JPL
466078	2012 AU_{6}	—	January 4, 2012	Mount Lemmon	Mount Lemmon Survey	·	710 m	MPC · JPL
466079	2012 AJ_{13}	—	February 2, 2009	Kitt Peak	Spacewatch	·	780 m	MPC · JPL
466080	2012 AP_{21}	—	January 3, 2012	Mount Lemmon	Mount Lemmon Survey	·	890 m	MPC · JPL
466081	2012 AB_{24}	—	March 18, 2009	Kitt Peak	Spacewatch	·	720 m	MPC · JPL
466082	2012 BR_{5}	—	December 29, 2011	Kitt Peak	Spacewatch	·	630 m	MPC · JPL
466083	2012 BJ_{9}	—	December 16, 2007	Kitt Peak	Spacewatch	·	970 m	MPC · JPL
466084	2012 BK_{24}	—	December 30, 2000	Socorro	LINEAR	·	910 m	MPC · JPL
466085	2012 BL_{71}	—	January 21, 2012	Catalina	CSS	·	1.0 km	MPC · JPL
466086	2012 BP_{88}	—	March 11, 2005	Kitt Peak	Spacewatch	·	790 m	MPC · JPL
466087	2012 BK_{91}	—	January 26, 2012	Kitt Peak	Spacewatch	·	930 m	MPC · JPL
466088	2012 BW_{100}	—	January 27, 2012	Kitt Peak	Spacewatch	·	1.2 km	MPC · JPL
466089	2012 BZ_{106}	—	August 13, 2010	Kitt Peak	Spacewatch	V	720 m	MPC · JPL
466090	2012 BO_{108}	—	August 21, 2006	Kitt Peak	Spacewatch	·	710 m	MPC · JPL
466091	2012 BP_{109}	—	November 15, 2007	Mount Lemmon	Mount Lemmon Survey	·	1.2 km	MPC · JPL
466092	2012 BU_{111}	—	February 19, 2001	Socorro	LINEAR	·	1.2 km	MPC · JPL
466093	2012 BN_{124}	—	September 17, 2010	Mount Lemmon	Mount Lemmon Survey	NYS	960 m	MPC · JPL
466094	2012 BV_{131}	—	December 4, 2007	Mount Lemmon	Mount Lemmon Survey	·	1.5 km	MPC · JPL
466095	2012 BZ_{142}	—	January 15, 2010	WISE	WISE	L4	10 km	MPC · JPL
466096	2012 CF_{1}	—	February 17, 2001	Kitt Peak	Spacewatch	MAS	540 m	MPC · JPL
466097	2012 CC_{3}	—	February 2, 2012	Kitt Peak	Spacewatch	NYS	960 m	MPC · JPL
466098	2012 CZ_{8}	—	December 30, 2007	Kitt Peak	Spacewatch	·	860 m	MPC · JPL
466099	2012 CO_{14}	—	September 17, 2003	Kitt Peak	Spacewatch	·	1.0 km	MPC · JPL
466100	2012 CN_{15}	—	April 7, 2005	Kitt Peak	Spacewatch	·	890 m	MPC · JPL

== 466101–466200 ==
back to top

Designation			Discovery			Properties		Ref
Permanent	Provisional	Named after	Date	Site	Discoverer(s)	Category	Diam.	Ref
466101	2012 CT_{22}	—	January 4, 2012	Mount Lemmon	Mount Lemmon Survey	·	990 m	MPC · JPL
466102	2012 CV_{23}	—	November 5, 2007	Kitt Peak	Spacewatch	·	1.1 km	MPC · JPL
466103	2012 CF_{34}	—	November 11, 2007	Mount Lemmon	Mount Lemmon Survey	·	1.1 km	MPC · JPL
466104	2012 CX_{34}	—	January 21, 2012	Kitt Peak	Spacewatch	·	800 m	MPC · JPL
466105	2012 CG_{40}	—	March 11, 2005	Mount Lemmon	Mount Lemmon Survey	NYS	820 m	MPC · JPL
466106	2012 CX_{47}	—	December 31, 2007	Mount Lemmon	Mount Lemmon Survey	NYS	1.2 km	MPC · JPL
466107	2012 CP_{50}	—	December 4, 2007	Mount Lemmon	Mount Lemmon Survey	NYS	960 m	MPC · JPL
466108	2012 CA_{51}	—	April 24, 2001	Kitt Peak	Spacewatch	·	840 m	MPC · JPL
466109	2012 DZ_{8}	—	January 11, 2008	Kitt Peak	Spacewatch	·	800 m	MPC · JPL
466110	2012 DR_{14}	—	April 4, 2005	Mount Lemmon	Mount Lemmon Survey	·	740 m	MPC · JPL
466111	2012 DL_{20}	—	February 19, 2012	Kitt Peak	Spacewatch	·	580 m	MPC · JPL
466112	2012 DB_{29}	—	February 11, 2008	Kitt Peak	Spacewatch	·	960 m	MPC · JPL
466113	2012 DN_{35}	—	February 3, 2008	Kitt Peak	Spacewatch	·	1.1 km	MPC · JPL
466114	2012 DN_{38}	—	December 28, 2011	Mount Lemmon	Mount Lemmon Survey	·	680 m	MPC · JPL
466115	2012 DE_{50}	—	February 8, 2008	Kitt Peak	Spacewatch	·	900 m	MPC · JPL
466116	2012 DR_{51}	—	February 2, 2008	Mount Lemmon	Mount Lemmon Survey	·	960 m	MPC · JPL
466117	2012 DX_{66}	—	January 27, 2012	Kitt Peak	Spacewatch	·	1.0 km	MPC · JPL
466118	2012 DS_{67}	—	January 19, 2012	Kitt Peak	Spacewatch	·	1.0 km	MPC · JPL
466119	2012 DY_{67}	—	January 20, 2012	Kitt Peak	Spacewatch	·	980 m	MPC · JPL
466120	2012 DG_{82}	—	February 2, 2008	Catalina	CSS	·	970 m	MPC · JPL
466121	2012 EJ	—	November 6, 2010	Mount Lemmon	Mount Lemmon Survey	CLA	1.4 km	MPC · JPL
466122	2012 EY_{6}	—	December 31, 2007	Kitt Peak	Spacewatch	·	1.1 km	MPC · JPL
466123	2012 EM_{7}	—	March 24, 2001	Kitt Peak	Spacewatch	·	1.1 km	MPC · JPL
466124	2012 EZ_{13}	—	June 19, 2009	Kitt Peak	Spacewatch	·	1.0 km	MPC · JPL
466125	2012 EF_{14}	—	September 20, 2009	Kitt Peak	Spacewatch	·	1.3 km	MPC · JPL
466126	2012 EC_{16}	—	February 3, 2012	Mount Lemmon	Mount Lemmon Survey	·	1.0 km	MPC · JPL
466127	2012 FT_{1}	—	September 29, 2005	Kitt Peak	Spacewatch	·	2.1 km	MPC · JPL
466128	2012 FO_{17}	—	April 12, 2008	Mount Lemmon	Mount Lemmon Survey	·	860 m	MPC · JPL
466129	2012 FX_{21}	—	December 13, 2006	Mount Lemmon	Mount Lemmon Survey	·	1.4 km	MPC · JPL
466130	2012 FZ_{23}	—	March 23, 2012	Siding Spring	SSS	T_{j} (2.37) · APO +1km · PHA	800 m	MPC · JPL
466131	2012 FE_{25}	—	September 25, 2009	Mount Lemmon	Mount Lemmon Survey	·	1.4 km	MPC · JPL
466132	2012 FP_{37}	—	March 25, 2012	Mount Lemmon	Mount Lemmon Survey	·	1.5 km	MPC · JPL
466133	2012 FQ_{44}	—	September 14, 2009	Kitt Peak	Spacewatch	·	1.7 km	MPC · JPL
466134	2012 FQ_{65}	—	February 26, 2008	Kitt Peak	Spacewatch	(6769)	930 m	MPC · JPL
466135	2012 FW_{68}	—	April 3, 2008	Kitt Peak	Spacewatch	·	1.3 km	MPC · JPL
466136	2012 FF_{75}	—	December 13, 1999	Kitt Peak	Spacewatch	·	1.1 km	MPC · JPL
466137	2012 GZ_{30}	—	February 25, 2012	Mount Lemmon	Mount Lemmon Survey	·	1.1 km	MPC · JPL
466138	2012 GU_{31}	—	March 24, 2012	Kitt Peak	Spacewatch	·	1.0 km	MPC · JPL
466139	2012 HH_{1}	—	December 2, 2010	Mount Lemmon	Mount Lemmon Survey	·	1.6 km	MPC · JPL
466140	2012 HG_{16}	—	April 16, 2012	Catalina	CSS	·	1.6 km	MPC · JPL
466141	2012 HQ_{18}	—	January 10, 2011	Kitt Peak	Spacewatch	·	1.8 km	MPC · JPL
466142	2012 HG_{19}	—	May 27, 2008	Mount Lemmon	Mount Lemmon Survey	·	1.5 km	MPC · JPL
466143	2012 HD_{27}	—	June 30, 2005	Kitt Peak	Spacewatch	·	1.2 km	MPC · JPL
466144	2012 HU_{29}	—	April 14, 2008	Kitt Peak	Spacewatch	·	1.1 km	MPC · JPL
466145	2012 HM_{34}	—	April 22, 2012	Kitt Peak	Spacewatch	EUN	1 km	MPC · JPL
466146	2012 HU_{38}	—	March 2, 2010	WISE	WISE	·	3.9 km	MPC · JPL
466147	2012 HA_{44}	—	May 6, 2008	Mount Lemmon	Mount Lemmon Survey	·	1.3 km	MPC · JPL
466148	2012 HZ_{45}	—	February 6, 2007	Mount Lemmon	Mount Lemmon Survey	·	1.3 km	MPC · JPL
466149	2012 HY_{49}	—	January 27, 2011	Mount Lemmon	Mount Lemmon Survey	·	1.9 km	MPC · JPL
466150	2012 HR_{51}	—	September 20, 2009	Kitt Peak	Spacewatch	·	1.3 km	MPC · JPL
466151	2012 HU_{54}	—	November 11, 2009	Kitt Peak	Spacewatch	·	1.5 km	MPC · JPL
466152	2012 HQ_{56}	—	October 25, 2005	Kitt Peak	Spacewatch	·	1.2 km	MPC · JPL
466153	2012 HC_{57}	—	March 28, 2012	Mount Lemmon	Mount Lemmon Survey	·	1.5 km	MPC · JPL
466154	2012 HC_{61}	—	September 22, 2009	Mount Lemmon	Mount Lemmon Survey	·	1.4 km	MPC · JPL
466155	2012 HW_{66}	—	November 16, 2009	Mount Lemmon	Mount Lemmon Survey	EUN	1.2 km	MPC · JPL
466156	2012 HP_{67}	—	November 18, 2009	Kitt Peak	Spacewatch	·	2.4 km	MPC · JPL
466157	2012 HR_{70}	—	November 17, 2009	Mount Lemmon	Mount Lemmon Survey	EUN	1.1 km	MPC · JPL
466158	2012 HY_{72}	—	March 27, 2012	Mount Lemmon	Mount Lemmon Survey	·	1.3 km	MPC · JPL
466159	2012 HP_{74}	—	November 12, 2005	Kitt Peak	Spacewatch	·	1.8 km	MPC · JPL
466160	2012 HZ_{77}	—	January 27, 2007	Mount Lemmon	Mount Lemmon Survey	·	1.1 km	MPC · JPL
466161	2012 HR_{79}	—	March 1, 2012	Mount Lemmon	Mount Lemmon Survey	EUN	980 m	MPC · JPL
466162	2012 JO_{3}	—	April 19, 2012	Kitt Peak	Spacewatch	·	1.4 km	MPC · JPL
466163	2012 JB_{7}	—	March 30, 2012	Mount Lemmon	Mount Lemmon Survey	·	2.2 km	MPC · JPL
466164	2012 JW_{7}	—	February 26, 2012	Mount Lemmon	Mount Lemmon Survey	EUN	1.7 km	MPC · JPL
466165	2012 JH_{10}	—	May 14, 2008	Mount Lemmon	Mount Lemmon Survey	·	1.1 km	MPC · JPL
466166	2012 JS_{16}	—	May 12, 2012	Mount Lemmon	Mount Lemmon Survey	·	1.1 km	MPC · JPL
466167	2012 JC_{20}	—	March 29, 2012	Mount Lemmon	Mount Lemmon Survey	·	1.2 km	MPC · JPL
466168	2012 JU_{20}	—	May 1, 2012	Mount Lemmon	Mount Lemmon Survey	·	1.1 km	MPC · JPL
466169	2012 JJ_{24}	—	March 1, 2012	Mount Lemmon	Mount Lemmon Survey	·	1.8 km	MPC · JPL
466170	2012 JD_{27}	—	January 3, 2011	Mount Lemmon	Mount Lemmon Survey	·	1.6 km	MPC · JPL
466171	2012 JQ_{27}	—	March 16, 2007	Kitt Peak	Spacewatch	HOF	2.4 km	MPC · JPL
466172	2012 JR_{28}	—	October 24, 2009	Kitt Peak	Spacewatch	·	1.7 km	MPC · JPL
466173	2012 JG_{39}	—	May 1, 2012	Mount Lemmon	Mount Lemmon Survey	·	1.1 km	MPC · JPL
466174	2012 JA_{40}	—	May 12, 2012	Mount Lemmon	Mount Lemmon Survey	MRX	1.1 km	MPC · JPL
466175	2012 JP_{41}	—	April 28, 2012	Mount Lemmon	Mount Lemmon Survey	GEF	1.4 km	MPC · JPL
466176	2012 JG_{57}	—	May 12, 2012	Mount Lemmon	Mount Lemmon Survey	·	1.3 km	MPC · JPL
466177	2012 JS_{60}	—	April 8, 2008	Kitt Peak	Spacewatch	·	950 m	MPC · JPL
466178	2012 KA_{5}	—	April 21, 2012	Mount Lemmon	Mount Lemmon Survey	·	2.7 km	MPC · JPL
466179	2012 KX_{9}	—	May 14, 2012	Mount Lemmon	Mount Lemmon Survey	·	1.3 km	MPC · JPL
466180	2012 KY_{9}	—	April 20, 2012	Kitt Peak	Spacewatch	(5)	990 m	MPC · JPL
466181	2012 KQ_{14}	—	March 29, 2012	Kitt Peak	Spacewatch	·	1.0 km	MPC · JPL
466182	2012 KF_{16}	—	June 27, 2008	Siding Spring	SSS	·	1.5 km	MPC · JPL
466183	2012 KK_{16}	—	October 9, 2004	Kitt Peak	Spacewatch	·	1.4 km	MPC · JPL
466184	2012 KB_{18}	—	January 26, 2007	Kitt Peak	Spacewatch	·	1.5 km	MPC · JPL
466185	2012 KH_{19}	—	May 14, 2008	Mount Lemmon	Mount Lemmon Survey	·	1.2 km	MPC · JPL
466186	2012 KC_{28}	—	October 7, 2004	Kitt Peak	Spacewatch	·	1.8 km	MPC · JPL
466187	2012 KK_{28}	—	October 1, 2005	Mount Lemmon	Mount Lemmon Survey	·	1.7 km	MPC · JPL
466188	2012 KQ_{28}	—	May 1, 2012	Mount Lemmon	Mount Lemmon Survey	·	990 m	MPC · JPL
466189	2012 KS_{28}	—	July 16, 2004	Socorro	LINEAR	·	1.2 km	MPC · JPL
466190	2012 KZ_{28}	—	April 6, 2008	Mount Lemmon	Mount Lemmon Survey	MAR	1.1 km	MPC · JPL
466191	2012 KL_{45}	—	May 28, 2012	Mount Lemmon	Mount Lemmon Survey	AMO	610 m	MPC · JPL
466192	2012 KG_{46}	—	October 27, 2005	Kitt Peak	Spacewatch	·	3.6 km	MPC · JPL
466193	2012 KM_{46}	—	May 21, 2012	Mount Lemmon	Mount Lemmon Survey	·	1.2 km	MPC · JPL
466194	2012 KC_{47}	—	July 30, 2008	Catalina	CSS	JUN	1.2 km	MPC · JPL
466195	2012 KR_{49}	—	January 17, 2007	Mount Lemmon	Mount Lemmon Survey	·	1.1 km	MPC · JPL
466196	2012 KD_{51}	—	April 19, 2012	Mount Lemmon	Mount Lemmon Survey	·	1.7 km	MPC · JPL
466197	2012 LL_{8}	—	December 8, 2010	Mount Lemmon	Mount Lemmon Survey	·	2.2 km	MPC · JPL
466198	2012 LB_{10}	—	May 31, 2012	Mount Lemmon	Mount Lemmon Survey	·	2.1 km	MPC · JPL
466199	2012 LC_{14}	—	October 25, 2000	Kitt Peak	Spacewatch	·	1.4 km	MPC · JPL
466200	2012 LZ_{15}	—	September 29, 2009	Mount Lemmon	Mount Lemmon Survey	·	1.3 km	MPC · JPL

== 466201–466300 ==
back to top

Designation			Discovery			Properties		Ref
Permanent	Provisional	Named after	Date	Site	Discoverer(s)	Category	Diam.	Ref
466201	2012 LQ_{26}	—	January 30, 2011	Mount Lemmon	Mount Lemmon Survey	PHO	1.0 km	MPC · JPL
466202	2012 MW	—	November 26, 2005	Mount Lemmon	Mount Lemmon Survey	JUN	1.1 km	MPC · JPL
466203	2012 PE_{3}	—	June 16, 2006	Kitt Peak	Spacewatch	·	1.8 km	MPC · JPL
466204	2012 PW_{8}	—	December 5, 2008	Kitt Peak	Spacewatch	EOS	1.7 km	MPC · JPL
466205	2012 PH_{18}	—	May 15, 2010	WISE	WISE	·	4.3 km	MPC · JPL
466206	2012 QM_{21}	—	September 12, 2007	Kitt Peak	Spacewatch	EOS	1.4 km	MPC · JPL
466207	2012 QL_{30}	—	November 18, 2007	Mount Lemmon	Mount Lemmon Survey	·	2.5 km	MPC · JPL
466208	2012 QP_{33}	—	December 30, 2008	Mount Lemmon	Mount Lemmon Survey	·	2.7 km	MPC · JPL
466209	2012 QF_{36}	—	August 25, 2012	Kitt Peak	Spacewatch	L5	8.9 km	MPC · JPL
466210	2012 QL_{46}	—	September 10, 2007	Kitt Peak	Spacewatch	·	1.7 km	MPC · JPL
466211	2012 RD_{26}	—	April 2, 2011	Kitt Peak	Spacewatch	·	2.9 km	MPC · JPL
466212	2012 RU_{26}	—	March 28, 2011	Mount Lemmon	Mount Lemmon Survey	·	1.7 km	MPC · JPL
466213	2012 RJ_{43}	—	June 10, 2011	Mount Lemmon	Mount Lemmon Survey	·	3.2 km	MPC · JPL
466214	2012 SZ_{1}	—	October 10, 1996	Kitt Peak	Spacewatch	·	1.9 km	MPC · JPL
466215	2012 SV_{36}	—	August 28, 2006	Catalina	CSS	·	2.8 km	MPC · JPL
466216	2012 SF_{42}	—	February 25, 2011	Kitt Peak	Spacewatch	H	350 m	MPC · JPL
466217	2012 SP_{56}	—	September 5, 2007	Siding Spring	SSS	H	400 m	MPC · JPL
466218	2012 SF_{62}	—	August 16, 2006	Siding Spring	SSS	·	3.7 km	MPC · JPL
466219	2012 TA_{1}	—	March 15, 2004	Kitt Peak	Spacewatch	EOS	1.9 km	MPC · JPL
466220	2012 TO_{5}	—	October 21, 2008	Mount Lemmon	Mount Lemmon Survey	·	2.0 km	MPC · JPL
466221	2012 TW_{29}	—	November 5, 2007	Kitt Peak	Spacewatch	·	2.4 km	MPC · JPL
466222	2012 TH_{33}	—	September 14, 2007	Mount Lemmon	Mount Lemmon Survey	·	2.5 km	MPC · JPL
466223	2012 TJ_{55}	—	May 21, 2006	Kitt Peak	Spacewatch	H	410 m	MPC · JPL
466224	2012 TZ_{100}	—	May 12, 2011	Mount Lemmon	Mount Lemmon Survey	·	2.9 km	MPC · JPL
466225	2012 TH_{121}	—	March 12, 2010	Mount Lemmon	Mount Lemmon Survey	·	2.7 km	MPC · JPL
466226	2012 TY_{138}	—	June 3, 2011	Mount Lemmon	Mount Lemmon Survey	·	2.7 km	MPC · JPL
466227	2012 TK_{175}	—	October 8, 2007	Mount Lemmon	Mount Lemmon Survey	EOS	1.7 km	MPC · JPL
466228	2012 TD_{211}	—	June 17, 2010	WISE	WISE	·	2.8 km	MPC · JPL
466229	2012 TP_{218}	—	August 27, 2006	Anderson Mesa	LONEOS	THB	2.4 km	MPC · JPL
466230	2012 TS_{233}	—	March 4, 2010	Kitt Peak	Spacewatch	·	3.3 km	MPC · JPL
466231	2012 TU_{300}	—	October 15, 2001	Socorro	LINEAR	·	3.7 km	MPC · JPL
466232	2012 TB_{312}	—	June 11, 2011	Mount Lemmon	Mount Lemmon Survey	·	3.0 km	MPC · JPL
466233	2012 UM_{84}	—	May 5, 2010	Mount Lemmon	Mount Lemmon Survey	·	8.2 km	MPC · JPL
466234	2012 UR_{131}	—	October 2, 2006	Mount Lemmon	Mount Lemmon Survey	CYB	4.5 km	MPC · JPL
466235	2012 VG_{50}	—	September 18, 2006	Kitt Peak	Spacewatch	THM	2.4 km	MPC · JPL
466236	2013 AH_{1}	—	December 18, 2004	Socorro	LINEAR	H	590 m	MPC · JPL
466237	2013 AB_{54}	—	January 4, 2013	Kitt Peak	Spacewatch	H	650 m	MPC · JPL
466238	2013 AD_{131}	—	November 8, 2010	Mount Lemmon	Mount Lemmon Survey	L4	7.8 km	MPC · JPL
466239	2013 BU_{16}	—	October 16, 2009	Mount Lemmon	Mount Lemmon Survey	L4 · ERY	7.0 km	MPC · JPL
466240	2013 BJ_{39}	—	January 4, 2013	Kitt Peak	Spacewatch	L4	8.3 km	MPC · JPL
466241	2013 CG_{1}	—	May 11, 2005	Mount Lemmon	Mount Lemmon Survey	H	650 m	MPC · JPL
466242	2013 CN_{75}	—	April 15, 2008	Catalina	CSS	H	600 m	MPC · JPL
466243	2013 CN_{82}	—	February 13, 2008	Kitt Peak	Spacewatch	H	480 m	MPC · JPL
466244	2013 CY_{102}	—	January 1, 2012	Mount Lemmon	Mount Lemmon Survey	L4	7.5 km	MPC · JPL
466245	2013 CF_{104}	—	September 28, 2009	Mount Lemmon	Mount Lemmon Survey	L4	7.5 km	MPC · JPL
466246	2013 CK_{174}	—	February 9, 2002	Kitt Peak	Spacewatch	H	450 m	MPC · JPL
466247	2013 CT_{212}	—	February 6, 2013	Kitt Peak	Spacewatch	L4	9.0 km	MPC · JPL
466248	2013 DW_{11}	—	February 13, 2008	Kitt Peak	Spacewatch	H	380 m	MPC · JPL
466249	2013 EO	—	February 17, 2013	Kitt Peak	Spacewatch	H	620 m	MPC · JPL
466250	2013 FE_{8}	—	March 4, 2013	Siding Spring	SSS	H	630 m	MPC · JPL
466251	2013 GX_{59}	—	April 11, 2010	Kitt Peak	Spacewatch	·	1.0 km	MPC · JPL
466252	2013 GA_{72}	—	April 10, 2013	Siding Spring	SSS	·	1.6 km	MPC · JPL
466253	2013 GG_{126}	—	April 11, 2013	Kitt Peak	Spacewatch	·	550 m	MPC · JPL
466254	2013 HZ_{28}	—	December 8, 2005	Kitt Peak	Spacewatch	ADE	2.0 km	MPC · JPL
466255	2013 HL_{29}	—	September 28, 2011	Catalina	CSS	H	500 m	MPC · JPL
466256	2013 JY_{16}	—	July 7, 2010	WISE	WISE	·	1.7 km	MPC · JPL
466257	2013 JX_{30}	—	December 1, 2003	Catalina	CSS	·	2.2 km	MPC · JPL
466258	2013 JJ_{42}	—	April 11, 2013	Kitt Peak	Spacewatch	·	580 m	MPC · JPL
466259	2013 JA_{48}	—	March 2, 2006	Kitt Peak	Spacewatch	·	590 m	MPC · JPL
466260	2013 JJ_{48}	—	November 4, 2007	Kitt Peak	Spacewatch	V	540 m	MPC · JPL
466261	2013 KX_{6}	—	September 3, 2007	Catalina	CSS	·	680 m	MPC · JPL
466262	2013 KG_{14}	—	November 2, 2007	Mount Lemmon	Mount Lemmon Survey	·	730 m	MPC · JPL
466263	2013 KB_{18}	—	November 7, 2007	Catalina	CSS	·	870 m	MPC · JPL
466264	2013 LN	—	May 6, 2006	Mount Lemmon	Mount Lemmon Survey	(2076)	710 m	MPC · JPL
466265	2013 LR_{2}	—	May 6, 2006	Mount Lemmon	Mount Lemmon Survey	·	660 m	MPC · JPL
466266	2013 LM_{4}	—	September 21, 2007	XuYi	PMO NEO Survey Program	·	740 m	MPC · JPL
466267	2013 LN_{30}	—	August 20, 2004	Catalina	CSS	·	2.1 km	MPC · JPL
466268	2013 MQ_{3}	—	November 27, 2010	Mount Lemmon	Mount Lemmon Survey	·	510 m	MPC · JPL
466269	2013 MC_{5}	—	February 23, 2012	Mount Lemmon	Mount Lemmon Survey	·	640 m	MPC · JPL
466270	2013 MD_{10}	—	March 16, 2009	Kitt Peak	Spacewatch	MAS	670 m	MPC · JPL
466271	2013 NK_{5}	—	January 20, 2006	Catalina	CSS	·	4.1 km	MPC · JPL
466272	2013 NC_{9}	—	December 9, 2004	Kitt Peak	Spacewatch	·	750 m	MPC · JPL
466273	2013 NR_{19}	—	February 20, 2006	Kitt Peak	Spacewatch	·	630 m	MPC · JPL
466274	2013 OL_{4}	—	January 30, 2011	Mount Lemmon	Mount Lemmon Survey	·	2.9 km	MPC · JPL
466275	2013 OF_{7}	—	May 2, 2008	Kitt Peak	Spacewatch	·	1.2 km	MPC · JPL
466276	2013 OD_{8}	—	October 24, 2008	Catalina	CSS	LIX	3.5 km	MPC · JPL
466277	2013 PH	—	November 19, 2003	Kitt Peak	Spacewatch	·	870 m	MPC · JPL
466278	2013 PT	—	October 15, 2009	Mount Lemmon	Mount Lemmon Survey	·	1.5 km	MPC · JPL
466279	2013 PB_{4}	—	December 22, 2008	Catalina	CSS	T_{j} (2.98)	3.7 km	MPC · JPL
466280	2013 PN_{5}	—	February 8, 2011	Kitt Peak	Spacewatch	·	2.0 km	MPC · JPL
466281	2013 PQ_{12}	—	April 20, 2009	Kitt Peak	Spacewatch	BAP	850 m	MPC · JPL
466282	2013 PP_{16}	—	March 13, 2012	Mount Lemmon	Mount Lemmon Survey	·	1.0 km	MPC · JPL
466283	2013 PJ_{17}	—	January 29, 2011	Mount Lemmon	Mount Lemmon Survey	GEF	1.1 km	MPC · JPL
466284	2013 PF_{18}	—	February 6, 2007	Mount Lemmon	Mount Lemmon Survey	·	1.5 km	MPC · JPL
466285	2013 PC_{26}	—	December 10, 2010	Mount Lemmon	Mount Lemmon Survey	·	1.5 km	MPC · JPL
466286	2013 PB_{29}	—	October 28, 1998	Kitt Peak	Spacewatch	MAS	700 m	MPC · JPL
466287	2013 PH_{31}	—	October 17, 2010	Mount Lemmon	Mount Lemmon Survey	·	700 m	MPC · JPL
466288	2013 PL_{31}	—	May 8, 2005	Mount Lemmon	Mount Lemmon Survey	·	1.2 km	MPC · JPL
466289	2013 PX_{47}	—	September 26, 2006	Mount Lemmon	Mount Lemmon Survey	NYS	730 m	MPC · JPL
466290	2013 PS_{48}	—	January 9, 2011	Mount Lemmon	Mount Lemmon Survey	·	3.4 km	MPC · JPL
466291	2013 PK_{49}	—	September 27, 2006	Kitt Peak	Spacewatch	V	460 m	MPC · JPL
466292	2013 PB_{53}	—	October 17, 2010	Mount Lemmon	Mount Lemmon Survey	·	960 m	MPC · JPL
466293	2013 PT_{63}	—	January 20, 2012	Mount Lemmon	Mount Lemmon Survey	·	1.0 km	MPC · JPL
466294	2013 PC_{65}	—	March 29, 2008	Mount Lemmon	Mount Lemmon Survey	·	900 m	MPC · JPL
466295	2013 PW_{68}	—	October 9, 2010	Mount Lemmon	Mount Lemmon Survey	·	1.1 km	MPC · JPL
466296	2013 PC_{71}	—	March 9, 2008	Mount Lemmon	Mount Lemmon Survey	·	1.1 km	MPC · JPL
466297	2013 QR	—	June 14, 1999	Kitt Peak	Spacewatch	·	680 m	MPC · JPL
466298	2013 QY_{10}	—	July 30, 2008	Siding Spring	SSS	·	2.2 km	MPC · JPL
466299	2013 QN_{14}	—	September 11, 2004	Kitt Peak	Spacewatch	·	1.5 km	MPC · JPL
466300	2013 QK_{18}	—	April 18, 2009	Kitt Peak	Spacewatch	·	650 m	MPC · JPL

== 466301–466400 ==
back to top

Designation			Discovery			Properties		Ref
Permanent	Provisional	Named after	Date	Site	Discoverer(s)	Category	Diam.	Ref
466301	2013 QC_{28}	—	March 4, 2005	Mount Lemmon	Mount Lemmon Survey	V	560 m	MPC · JPL
466302	2013 QR_{34}	—	August 18, 2006	Kitt Peak	Spacewatch	·	1.2 km	MPC · JPL
466303	2013 QX_{34}	—	October 22, 2006	Kitt Peak	Spacewatch	·	1.2 km	MPC · JPL
466304	2013 QC_{39}	—	April 8, 2002	Kitt Peak	Spacewatch	·	540 m	MPC · JPL
466305	2013 QF_{39}	—	September 10, 2004	Socorro	LINEAR	·	1.6 km	MPC · JPL
466306	2013 QC_{43}	—	February 8, 2011	Mount Lemmon	Mount Lemmon Survey	·	1.5 km	MPC · JPL
466307	2013 QY_{43}	—	August 18, 2009	Kitt Peak	Spacewatch	·	1.0 km	MPC · JPL
466308	2013 QR_{47}	—	October 31, 2006	Mount Lemmon	Mount Lemmon Survey	·	1.2 km	MPC · JPL
466309	2013 QX_{47}	—	September 3, 2000	Socorro	LINEAR	·	1.7 km	MPC · JPL
466310	2013 QG_{48}	—	September 25, 2009	Catalina	CSS	·	1.5 km	MPC · JPL
466311	2013 QQ_{58}	—	December 15, 2004	Kitt Peak	Spacewatch	·	2.2 km	MPC · JPL
466312	2013 QJ_{64}	—	February 25, 2012	Mount Lemmon	Mount Lemmon Survey	·	1.2 km	MPC · JPL
466313	2013 QK_{64}	—	December 25, 2010	Mount Lemmon	Mount Lemmon Survey	·	1.4 km	MPC · JPL
466314	2013 QV_{64}	—	September 23, 2008	Mount Lemmon	Mount Lemmon Survey	·	2.5 km	MPC · JPL
466315	2013 QE_{65}	—	February 3, 2006	Mount Lemmon	Mount Lemmon Survey	·	2.6 km	MPC · JPL
466316	2013 QC_{68}	—	July 28, 2013	Kitt Peak	Spacewatch	NYS	980 m	MPC · JPL
466317	2013 QH_{70}	—	June 9, 2013	Mount Lemmon	Mount Lemmon Survey	·	3.1 km	MPC · JPL
466318	2013 QT_{70}	—	March 4, 2005	Mount Lemmon	Mount Lemmon Survey	·	920 m	MPC · JPL
466319	2013 QJ_{74}	—	March 5, 2008	Mount Lemmon	Mount Lemmon Survey	·	1.2 km	MPC · JPL
466320	2013 QO_{78}	—	April 12, 2005	Kitt Peak	Spacewatch	·	1.3 km	MPC · JPL
466321	2013 QB_{79}	—	February 7, 2011	Mount Lemmon	Mount Lemmon Survey	·	1.8 km	MPC · JPL
466322	2013 QQ_{80}	—	February 25, 2011	Mount Lemmon	Mount Lemmon Survey	·	2.0 km	MPC · JPL
466323	2013 QD_{82}	—	August 19, 2006	Kitt Peak	Spacewatch	·	780 m	MPC · JPL
466324	2013 QQ_{82}	—	September 30, 2009	Mount Lemmon	Mount Lemmon Survey	·	1.3 km	MPC · JPL
466325	2013 RR_{1}	—	March 10, 2007	Mount Lemmon	Mount Lemmon Survey	MRX	840 m	MPC · JPL
466326	2013 RG_{8}	—	December 30, 2005	Kitt Peak	Spacewatch	·	1.7 km	MPC · JPL
466327	2013 RR_{8}	—	August 12, 2013	Kitt Peak	Spacewatch	KOR	1.1 km	MPC · JPL
466328	2013 RE_{16}	—	October 27, 2005	Kitt Peak	Spacewatch	·	1.3 km	MPC · JPL
466329	2013 RB_{18}	—	September 26, 2000	Socorro	LINEAR	·	1.7 km	MPC · JPL
466330	2013 RC_{19}	—	April 1, 2012	Mount Lemmon	Mount Lemmon Survey	KON	2.2 km	MPC · JPL
466331	2013 RG_{22}	—	September 2, 2013	Mount Lemmon	Mount Lemmon Survey	·	2.3 km	MPC · JPL
466332	2013 RZ_{24}	—	September 6, 2008	Mount Lemmon	Mount Lemmon Survey	KOR	1.2 km	MPC · JPL
466333	2013 RR_{25}	—	March 29, 2011	Mount Lemmon	Mount Lemmon Survey	·	2.3 km	MPC · JPL
466334	2013 RJ_{26}	—	April 24, 2004	Kitt Peak	Spacewatch	·	1.3 km	MPC · JPL
466335	2013 RF_{27}	—	April 25, 2007	Kitt Peak	Spacewatch	·	2.2 km	MPC · JPL
466336	2013 RK_{28}	—	September 4, 2013	Mount Lemmon	Mount Lemmon Survey	KOR	1.3 km	MPC · JPL
466337	2013 RU_{28}	—	October 29, 2008	Kitt Peak	Spacewatch	·	2.1 km	MPC · JPL
466338	2013 RD_{29}	—	September 28, 2009	Kitt Peak	Spacewatch	·	1.0 km	MPC · JPL
466339	2013 RS_{30}	—	September 3, 2013	Kitt Peak	Spacewatch	·	2.4 km	MPC · JPL
466340	2013 RN_{32}	—	May 15, 2005	Mount Lemmon	Mount Lemmon Survey	·	1.1 km	MPC · JPL
466341	2013 RG_{33}	—	January 23, 2011	Mount Lemmon	Mount Lemmon Survey	MAS	850 m	MPC · JPL
466342	2013 RQ_{36}	—	September 3, 2013	Mount Lemmon	Mount Lemmon Survey	THM	2.1 km	MPC · JPL
466343	2013 RL_{37}	—	March 28, 2011	Mount Lemmon	Mount Lemmon Survey	·	1.8 km	MPC · JPL
466344	2013 RT_{40}	—	February 25, 2007	Mount Lemmon	Mount Lemmon Survey	ADE	2.3 km	MPC · JPL
466345	2013 RM_{45}	—	January 8, 2010	Kitt Peak	Spacewatch	EOS	2.2 km	MPC · JPL
466346	2013 RW_{48}	—	March 28, 2012	Kitt Peak	Spacewatch	·	1.6 km	MPC · JPL
466347	2013 RS_{49}	—	November 9, 2009	Mount Lemmon	Mount Lemmon Survey	·	2.0 km	MPC · JPL
466348	2013 RA_{51}	—	February 13, 2011	Mount Lemmon	Mount Lemmon Survey	·	2.0 km	MPC · JPL
466349	2013 RP_{52}	—	December 14, 2010	Mount Lemmon	Mount Lemmon Survey	·	1.1 km	MPC · JPL
466350	2013 RS_{54}	—	March 26, 2010	WISE	WISE	·	3.7 km	MPC · JPL
466351	2013 RT_{55}	—	January 13, 2010	Mount Lemmon	Mount Lemmon Survey	EOS	2.8 km	MPC · JPL
466352	2013 RF_{57}	—	October 29, 2005	Kitt Peak	Spacewatch	(5)	1.1 km	MPC · JPL
466353	2013 RE_{58}	—	September 1, 2005	Kitt Peak	Spacewatch	·	820 m	MPC · JPL
466354	2013 RT_{58}	—	September 5, 2008	Kitt Peak	Spacewatch	·	2.0 km	MPC · JPL
466355	2013 RY_{58}	—	May 8, 2005	Mount Lemmon	Mount Lemmon Survey	·	1.1 km	MPC · JPL
466356	2013 RO_{60}	—	September 14, 2007	Mount Lemmon	Mount Lemmon Survey	TIR	3.2 km	MPC · JPL
466357	2013 RQ_{60}	—	March 9, 2011	Mount Lemmon	Mount Lemmon Survey	·	1.7 km	MPC · JPL
466358	2013 RV_{60}	—	September 30, 2009	Mount Lemmon	Mount Lemmon Survey	·	1.6 km	MPC · JPL
466359	2013 RX_{61}	—	November 25, 2009	Kitt Peak	Spacewatch	·	1.6 km	MPC · JPL
466360	2013 RG_{62}	—	February 24, 2008	Mount Lemmon	Mount Lemmon Survey	·	1.0 km	MPC · JPL
466361	2013 RZ_{62}	—	October 14, 1999	Kitt Peak	Spacewatch	KOR	1.3 km	MPC · JPL
466362	2013 RH_{63}	—	September 24, 2008	Kitt Peak	Spacewatch	·	2.2 km	MPC · JPL
466363	2013 RL_{71}	—	February 25, 2011	Mount Lemmon	Mount Lemmon Survey	·	3.6 km	MPC · JPL
466364	2013 RU_{74}	—	March 3, 2010	WISE	WISE	·	3.4 km	MPC · JPL
466365	2013 RD_{78}	—	March 4, 2005	Mount Lemmon	Mount Lemmon Survey	·	2.4 km	MPC · JPL
466366	2013 RM_{81}	—	March 8, 2005	Mount Lemmon	Mount Lemmon Survey	·	850 m	MPC · JPL
466367	2013 RN_{82}	—	April 19, 2006	Mount Lemmon	Mount Lemmon Survey	·	2.4 km	MPC · JPL
466368	2013 RT_{85}	—	September 13, 2013	Kitt Peak	Spacewatch	·	2.6 km	MPC · JPL
466369	2013 RO_{86}	—	September 11, 2004	Socorro	LINEAR	·	1.5 km	MPC · JPL
466370	2013 RC_{88}	—	October 6, 2008	Mount Lemmon	Mount Lemmon Survey	·	3.0 km	MPC · JPL
466371	2013 RJ_{88}	—	May 22, 2012	Mount Lemmon	Mount Lemmon Survey	·	1.8 km	MPC · JPL
466372	2013 RA_{89}	—	September 28, 2008	Mount Lemmon	Mount Lemmon Survey	·	1.6 km	MPC · JPL
466373	2013 RY_{89}	—	March 13, 2005	Catalina	CSS	·	3.5 km	MPC · JPL
466374	2013 RY_{90}	—	September 6, 2013	Kitt Peak	Spacewatch	(31811)	3.4 km	MPC · JPL
466375	2013 RB_{93}	—	April 30, 2008	Mount Lemmon	Mount Lemmon Survey	·	1.5 km	MPC · JPL
466376	2013 RN_{93}	—	September 23, 2008	Kitt Peak	Spacewatch	EOS	1.4 km	MPC · JPL
466377	2013 RQ_{96}	—	September 30, 2009	Mount Lemmon	Mount Lemmon Survey	·	1.1 km	MPC · JPL
466378	2013 SS_{8}	—	February 18, 2010	Kitt Peak	Spacewatch	·	3.3 km	MPC · JPL
466379	2013 SY_{14}	—	March 6, 2008	Mount Lemmon	Mount Lemmon Survey	·	1.2 km	MPC · JPL
466380	2013 SU_{15}	—	March 16, 2012	Mount Lemmon	Mount Lemmon Survey	·	870 m	MPC · JPL
466381	2013 SP_{16}	—	August 16, 2009	Catalina	CSS	PHO	690 m	MPC · JPL
466382	2013 SO_{21}	—	September 19, 2008	Kitt Peak	Spacewatch	·	3.1 km	MPC · JPL
466383	2013 SX_{26}	—	October 2, 2008	Mount Lemmon	Mount Lemmon Survey	EOS	2.7 km	MPC · JPL
466384	2013 SQ_{33}	—	May 11, 2004	Catalina	CSS	·	1.9 km	MPC · JPL
466385	2013 SK_{34}	—	March 30, 2011	Mount Lemmon	Mount Lemmon Survey	VER	2.8 km	MPC · JPL
466386	2013 SX_{38}	—	April 12, 2011	Mount Lemmon	Mount Lemmon Survey	·	2.6 km	MPC · JPL
466387	2013 SD_{42}	—	September 13, 2007	Mount Lemmon	Mount Lemmon Survey	·	3.2 km	MPC · JPL
466388	2013 SO_{42}	—	August 30, 2009	Kitt Peak	Spacewatch	·	1.9 km	MPC · JPL
466389	2013 SH_{43}	—	March 26, 2011	Kitt Peak	Spacewatch	·	2.6 km	MPC · JPL
466390	2013 SQ_{45}	—	October 26, 2008	Kitt Peak	Spacewatch	·	2.5 km	MPC · JPL
466391	2013 SV_{45}	—	April 2, 2011	Kitt Peak	Spacewatch	·	2.2 km	MPC · JPL
466392	2013 SK_{46}	—	October 8, 2008	Mount Lemmon	Mount Lemmon Survey	·	2.0 km	MPC · JPL
466393	2013 SF_{47}	—	November 10, 2005	Mount Lemmon	Mount Lemmon Survey	·	1.3 km	MPC · JPL
466394	2013 SO_{47}	—	September 21, 2009	Kitt Peak	Spacewatch	EUN	980 m	MPC · JPL
466395	2013 SC_{51}	—	September 20, 2008	Catalina	CSS	·	2.0 km	MPC · JPL
466396	2013 SL_{51}	—	October 6, 2008	Mount Lemmon	Mount Lemmon Survey	·	1.7 km	MPC · JPL
466397	2013 SS_{56}	—	January 23, 2006	Kitt Peak	Spacewatch	AGN	1.3 km	MPC · JPL
466398	2013 SL_{61}	—	January 25, 2006	Kitt Peak	Spacewatch	·	1.9 km	MPC · JPL
466399	2013 SQ_{61}	—	July 3, 2005	Mount Lemmon	Mount Lemmon Survey	·	990 m	MPC · JPL
466400	2013 SZ_{61}	—	September 2, 2013	Mount Lemmon	Mount Lemmon Survey	·	2.4 km	MPC · JPL

== 466401–466500 ==
back to top

Designation			Discovery			Properties		Ref
Permanent	Provisional	Named after	Date	Site	Discoverer(s)	Category	Diam.	Ref
466401	2013 SX_{63}	—	April 24, 2001	Kitt Peak	Spacewatch	·	1.2 km	MPC · JPL
466402	2013 SE_{64}	—	October 1, 2008	Mount Lemmon	Mount Lemmon Survey	·	1.7 km	MPC · JPL
466403	2013 SB_{66}	—	February 16, 2010	Kitt Peak	Spacewatch	·	2.0 km	MPC · JPL
466404	2013 SG_{67}	—	September 30, 2003	Kitt Peak	Spacewatch	·	1.4 km	MPC · JPL
466405	2013 SQ_{68}	—	September 16, 2003	Kitt Peak	Spacewatch	·	1.7 km	MPC · JPL
466406	2013 SQ_{72}	—	April 13, 2012	Mount Lemmon	Mount Lemmon Survey	·	1.3 km	MPC · JPL
466407	2013 SH_{74}	—	September 6, 2008	Kitt Peak	Spacewatch	KOR	1.2 km	MPC · JPL
466408	2013 SC_{79}	—	January 23, 2006	Mount Lemmon	Mount Lemmon Survey	·	1.8 km	MPC · JPL
466409	2013 SE_{79}	—	January 26, 2011	Mount Lemmon	Mount Lemmon Survey	·	1.4 km	MPC · JPL
466410	2013 SN_{80}	—	November 26, 2009	Mount Lemmon	Mount Lemmon Survey	·	1.4 km	MPC · JPL
466411	2013 SR_{80}	—	October 30, 2008	Scranton	G. Hug	·	2.3 km	MPC · JPL
466412	2013 SV_{80}	—	February 26, 2011	Mount Lemmon	Mount Lemmon Survey	·	1.7 km	MPC · JPL
466413	2013 SA_{81}	—	October 20, 1995	Kitt Peak	Spacewatch	·	1.7 km	MPC · JPL
466414	2013 TH_{1}	—	March 30, 2011	Mount Lemmon	Mount Lemmon Survey	·	2.1 km	MPC · JPL
466415	2013 TD_{2}	—	September 27, 2003	Kitt Peak	Spacewatch	·	2.3 km	MPC · JPL
466416	2013 TX_{4}	—	May 9, 2005	Siding Spring	SSS	·	1.6 km	MPC · JPL
466417	2013 TQ_{6}	—	October 27, 2009	Kitt Peak	Spacewatch	·	1.1 km	MPC · JPL
466418	2013 TY_{6}	—	November 9, 2009	Mount Lemmon	Mount Lemmon Survey	·	2.3 km	MPC · JPL
466419	2013 TL_{7}	—	April 2, 2005	Kitt Peak	Spacewatch	·	1.3 km	MPC · JPL
466420	2013 TF_{10}	—	July 30, 2008	Mount Lemmon	Mount Lemmon Survey	·	1.8 km	MPC · JPL
466421	2013 TH_{17}	—	December 2, 2008	Kitt Peak	Spacewatch	EOS	1.9 km	MPC · JPL
466422	2013 TA_{21}	—	September 23, 2008	Mount Lemmon	Mount Lemmon Survey	EOS	1.7 km	MPC · JPL
466423	2013 TV_{27}	—	September 3, 2013	Kitt Peak	Spacewatch	T_{j} (2.95)	3.5 km	MPC · JPL
466424	2013 TR_{29}	—	May 30, 2012	Mount Lemmon	Mount Lemmon Survey	·	2.0 km	MPC · JPL
466425	2013 TK_{30}	—	October 1, 2013	Kitt Peak	Spacewatch	·	2.4 km	MPC · JPL
466426	2013 TG_{32}	—	November 8, 2009	Mount Lemmon	Mount Lemmon Survey	·	970 m	MPC · JPL
466427	2013 TZ_{33}	—	January 8, 2010	WISE	WISE	·	3.3 km	MPC · JPL
466428	2013 TR_{39}	—	April 23, 2012	Kitt Peak	Spacewatch	ADE	1.4 km	MPC · JPL
466429	2013 TE_{43}	—	November 19, 2009	Mount Lemmon	Mount Lemmon Survey	·	1.5 km	MPC · JPL
466430	2013 TD_{46}	—	October 3, 2013	Mount Lemmon	Mount Lemmon Survey	EOS	1.5 km	MPC · JPL
466431	2013 TS_{47}	—	October 5, 2004	Kitt Peak	Spacewatch	·	1.9 km	MPC · JPL
466432	2013 TX_{48}	—	October 24, 2008	Kitt Peak	Spacewatch	·	1.6 km	MPC · JPL
466433	2013 TV_{51}	—	October 14, 2009	Mount Lemmon	Mount Lemmon Survey	·	1.3 km	MPC · JPL
466434	2013 TW_{51}	—	September 21, 2008	Mount Lemmon	Mount Lemmon Survey	KOR	1.3 km	MPC · JPL
466435	2013 TE_{57}	—	October 23, 1997	Kitt Peak	Spacewatch	·	3.3 km	MPC · JPL
466436	2013 TG_{59}	—	October 23, 2009	Kitt Peak	Spacewatch	·	1.3 km	MPC · JPL
466437	2013 TC_{64}	—	October 24, 2008	Kitt Peak	Spacewatch	·	1.7 km	MPC · JPL
466438	2013 TH_{70}	—	November 7, 2008	Mount Lemmon	Mount Lemmon Survey	THM	1.8 km	MPC · JPL
466439	2013 TL_{70}	—	May 2, 2006	Mount Lemmon	Mount Lemmon Survey	·	2.8 km	MPC · JPL
466440	2013 TW_{70}	—	October 7, 2004	Kitt Peak	Spacewatch	·	1.8 km	MPC · JPL
466441	2013 TL_{71}	—	March 14, 2007	Kitt Peak	Spacewatch	·	1.9 km	MPC · JPL
466442	2013 TX_{72}	—	October 3, 2013	Kitt Peak	Spacewatch	·	2.7 km	MPC · JPL
466443	2013 TQ_{81}	—	November 20, 2009	Kitt Peak	Spacewatch	·	1.7 km	MPC · JPL
466444	2013 TE_{82}	—	March 13, 2011	Mount Lemmon	Mount Lemmon Survey	·	1.6 km	MPC · JPL
466445	2013 TQ_{84}	—	September 5, 2008	Kitt Peak	Spacewatch	·	1.8 km	MPC · JPL
466446	2013 TG_{85}	—	March 4, 2005	Catalina	CSS	(43176)	3.1 km	MPC · JPL
466447	2013 TA_{88}	—	April 19, 2007	Kitt Peak	Spacewatch	·	1.7 km	MPC · JPL
466448	2013 TJ_{90}	—	September 5, 2008	Kitt Peak	Spacewatch	BRA	1.2 km	MPC · JPL
466449	2013 TH_{95}	—	April 2, 2011	Kitt Peak	Spacewatch	·	3.3 km	MPC · JPL
466450	2013 TL_{96}	—	September 15, 2007	Kitt Peak	Spacewatch	·	2.9 km	MPC · JPL
466451	2013 TO_{96}	—	September 4, 2007	Mount Lemmon	Mount Lemmon Survey	HYG	2.9 km	MPC · JPL
466452	2013 TF_{98}	—	April 13, 2011	Kitt Peak	Spacewatch	·	2.6 km	MPC · JPL
466453	2013 TL_{98}	—	September 11, 2007	Mount Lemmon	Mount Lemmon Survey	·	2.4 km	MPC · JPL
466454	2013 TM_{98}	—	December 4, 2008	Kitt Peak	Spacewatch	·	2.2 km	MPC · JPL
466455	2013 TF_{104}	—	May 15, 2010	WISE	WISE	·	2.7 km	MPC · JPL
466456	2013 TM_{105}	—	November 3, 2005	Catalina	CSS	(5)	1.1 km	MPC · JPL
466457	2013 TZ_{107}	—	August 29, 2006	Kitt Peak	Spacewatch	CYB	3.4 km	MPC · JPL
466458	2013 TU_{108}	—	October 10, 2007	Mount Lemmon	Mount Lemmon Survey	·	2.2 km	MPC · JPL
466459	2013 TR_{112}	—	September 12, 2007	Mount Lemmon	Mount Lemmon Survey	·	2.3 km	MPC · JPL
466460	2013 TH_{115}	—	October 3, 2013	Kitt Peak	Spacewatch	·	3.0 km	MPC · JPL
466461	2013 TH_{120}	—	November 25, 2009	Kitt Peak	Spacewatch	·	2.0 km	MPC · JPL
466462	2013 TY_{121}	—	April 30, 2006	Kitt Peak	Spacewatch	EOS	1.6 km	MPC · JPL
466463	2013 TG_{122}	—	May 9, 2011	Mount Lemmon	Mount Lemmon Survey	·	3.3 km	MPC · JPL
466464	2013 TK_{124}	—	January 8, 2010	WISE	WISE	·	3.8 km	MPC · JPL
466465	2013 TH_{125}	—	September 7, 2008	Catalina	CSS	AGN	1.2 km	MPC · JPL
466466	2013 TJ_{127}	—	December 1, 2008	Kitt Peak	Spacewatch	·	2.5 km	MPC · JPL
466467	2013 TO_{128}	—	April 30, 2005	Kitt Peak	Spacewatch	·	1.1 km	MPC · JPL
466468	2013 TA_{129}	—	September 6, 2013	Kitt Peak	Spacewatch	·	2.4 km	MPC · JPL
466469	2013 TN_{130}	—	September 25, 2013	Catalina	CSS	·	3.1 km	MPC · JPL
466470	2013 TB_{133}	—	April 14, 2007	Kitt Peak	Spacewatch	·	1.9 km	MPC · JPL
466471	2013 TU_{133}	—	September 21, 2009	Mount Lemmon	Mount Lemmon Survey	MAR	930 m	MPC · JPL
466472	2013 TM_{138}	—	September 28, 2008	Mount Lemmon	Mount Lemmon Survey	EOS	1.6 km	MPC · JPL
466473	2013 TT_{139}	—	March 21, 2010	Mount Lemmon	Mount Lemmon Survey	·	3.2 km	MPC · JPL
466474	2013 TU_{139}	—	September 22, 2009	Mount Lemmon	Mount Lemmon Survey	·	1.1 km	MPC · JPL
466475	2013 TY_{140}	—	April 4, 2005	Mount Lemmon	Mount Lemmon Survey	·	3.4 km	MPC · JPL
466476	2013 TR_{141}	—	February 24, 2006	Kitt Peak	Spacewatch	KOR	1.2 km	MPC · JPL
466477	2013 TD_{143}	—	June 16, 2012	Mount Lemmon	Mount Lemmon Survey	HYG	2.5 km	MPC · JPL
466478	2013 UU_{2}	—	October 6, 1999	Socorro	LINEAR	·	2.6 km	MPC · JPL
466479	2013 UR_{6}	—	September 7, 2000	Socorro	LINEAR	·	1.4 km	MPC · JPL
466480	2013 UU_{9}	—	November 19, 2008	Mount Lemmon	Mount Lemmon Survey	·	2.2 km	MPC · JPL
466481	2013 UJ_{13}	—	September 13, 2013	Mount Lemmon	Mount Lemmon Survey	·	2.9 km	MPC · JPL
466482	2013 UC_{14}	—	September 5, 2007	Catalina	CSS	·	6.2 km	MPC · JPL
466483	2013 VO_{2}	—	September 14, 2013	Mount Lemmon	Mount Lemmon Survey	·	2.6 km	MPC · JPL
466484	2013 VY_{3}	—	October 26, 2013	Catalina	CSS	·	2.1 km	MPC · JPL
466485	2013 VG_{11}	—	October 15, 2013	Mount Lemmon	Mount Lemmon Survey	HYG	2.6 km	MPC · JPL
466486	2013 VZ_{19}	—	November 1, 2008	Catalina	CSS	·	2.3 km	MPC · JPL
466487	2013 VD_{22}	—	October 16, 2007	Mount Lemmon	Mount Lemmon Survey	·	2.8 km	MPC · JPL
466488	2013 WB_{3}	—	October 25, 2008	Kitt Peak	Spacewatch	·	2.1 km	MPC · JPL
466489	2013 WQ_{6}	—	May 22, 2011	Mount Lemmon	Mount Lemmon Survey	·	2.9 km	MPC · JPL
466490	2013 WK_{11}	—	July 20, 2012	Siding Spring	SSS	·	2.1 km	MPC · JPL
466491	2013 WB_{22}	—	February 7, 2002	Kitt Peak	Spacewatch	·	1.8 km	MPC · JPL
466492	2013 WP_{23}	—	October 11, 2007	Kitt Peak	Spacewatch	·	4.2 km	MPC · JPL
466493	2013 WV_{26}	—	October 1, 2008	Catalina	CSS	·	2.4 km	MPC · JPL
466494	2013 WB_{30}	—	September 14, 2007	Mount Lemmon	Mount Lemmon Survey	·	2.0 km	MPC · JPL
466495	2013 WN_{30}	—	October 9, 2007	Kitt Peak	Spacewatch	VER	2.7 km	MPC · JPL
466496	2013 WU_{40}	—	April 12, 2011	Mount Lemmon	Mount Lemmon Survey	·	2.9 km	MPC · JPL
466497	2013 WC_{61}	—	May 26, 2011	Mount Lemmon	Mount Lemmon Survey	·	3.2 km	MPC · JPL
466498	2013 WD_{62}	—	September 14, 2013	Mount Lemmon	Mount Lemmon Survey	·	3.1 km	MPC · JPL
466499	2013 WA_{63}	—	September 15, 2007	Catalina	CSS	·	3.6 km	MPC · JPL
466500	2013 WQ_{98}	—	October 20, 2007	Mount Lemmon	Mount Lemmon Survey	·	4.1 km	MPC · JPL

== 466501–466600 ==
back to top

Designation			Discovery			Properties		Ref
Permanent	Provisional	Named after	Date	Site	Discoverer(s)	Category	Diam.	Ref
466501	2013 WF_{105}	—	May 16, 2010	WISE	WISE	·	3.1 km	MPC · JPL
466502	2013 YY_{53}	—	November 28, 2013	Mount Lemmon	Mount Lemmon Survey	URS	4.2 km	MPC · JPL
466503	2013 YJ_{103}	—	August 25, 2004	Siding Spring	SSS	·	2.9 km	MPC · JPL
466504	2014 AX_{20}	—	November 1, 2008	Mount Lemmon	Mount Lemmon Survey	·	3.0 km	MPC · JPL
466505	2014 AH_{51}	—	January 3, 2014	Catalina	CSS	H	570 m	MPC · JPL
466506	2014 DE_{89}	—	October 16, 2007	Mount Lemmon	Mount Lemmon Survey	GEF	1.5 km	MPC · JPL
466507	2014 FK_{33}	—	March 25, 2014	Mount Lemmon	Mount Lemmon Survey	ATE · critical	240 m	MPC · JPL
466508	2014 GY_{48}	—	April 8, 2014	Catalina	CSS	APO · PHA	640 m	MPC · JPL
466509	2014 OP_{28}	—	October 20, 2011	Kitt Peak	Spacewatch	·	560 m	MPC · JPL
466510	2014 OP_{122}	—	February 22, 2009	Kitt Peak	Spacewatch	·	880 m	MPC · JPL
466511	2014 OH_{187}	—	August 22, 2004	Kitt Peak	Spacewatch	·	690 m	MPC · JPL
466512	2014 OE_{295}	—	October 11, 2007	Mount Lemmon	Mount Lemmon Survey	·	850 m	MPC · JPL
466513	2014 OW_{338}	—	September 30, 2003	Socorro	LINEAR	·	900 m	MPC · JPL
466514	2014 PO_{44}	—	June 2, 2014	Mount Lemmon	Mount Lemmon Survey	·	840 m	MPC · JPL
466515	2014 PJ_{56}	—	September 13, 2007	Catalina	CSS	·	790 m	MPC · JPL
466516	2014 QV_{140}	—	January 31, 2006	Kitt Peak	Spacewatch	·	1.8 km	MPC · JPL
466517	2014 QS_{204}	—	October 9, 2007	Mount Lemmon	Mount Lemmon Survey	·	710 m	MPC · JPL
466518	2014 QD_{214}	—	September 14, 2007	Mount Lemmon	Mount Lemmon Survey	·	830 m	MPC · JPL
466519	2014 QP_{368}	—	November 16, 2006	Mount Lemmon	Mount Lemmon Survey	·	1.4 km	MPC · JPL
466520	2014 QJ_{369}	—	November 4, 2004	Kitt Peak	Spacewatch	·	680 m	MPC · JPL
466521	2014 QR_{373}	—	February 28, 2008	Mount Lemmon	Mount Lemmon Survey	H	470 m	MPC · JPL
466522	2014 QH_{377}	—	September 30, 2003	Kitt Peak	Spacewatch	·	1.1 km	MPC · JPL
466523	2014 QC_{409}	—	December 21, 2006	Kitt Peak	Spacewatch	(5)	1.2 km	MPC · JPL
466524	2014 QV_{420}	—	October 13, 2007	Mount Lemmon	Mount Lemmon Survey	·	720 m	MPC · JPL
466525	2014 QC_{421}	—	March 5, 2008	Mount Lemmon	Mount Lemmon Survey	H	560 m	MPC · JPL
466526	2014 QA_{432}	—	March 13, 2012	Kitt Peak	Spacewatch	MAR	1.2 km	MPC · JPL
466527	2014 QN_{438}	—	November 13, 2007	Kitt Peak	Spacewatch	·	870 m	MPC · JPL
466528	2014 RV_{58}	—	October 25, 2008	Kitt Peak	Spacewatch	·	650 m	MPC · JPL
466529	2014 SF	—	October 22, 2009	Mount Lemmon	Mount Lemmon Survey	H	550 m	MPC · JPL
466530	2014 SR	—	December 11, 2010	Siding Spring	SSS	·	2.3 km	MPC · JPL
466531	2014 SF_{23}	—	January 29, 2007	Kitt Peak	Spacewatch	HOF	2.8 km	MPC · JPL
466532	2014 SF_{56}	—	November 8, 2007	Socorro	LINEAR	·	1.1 km	MPC · JPL
466533	2014 SH_{57}	—	February 1, 2009	Kitt Peak	Spacewatch	·	670 m	MPC · JPL
466534	2014 SJ_{96}	—	December 1, 2003	Kitt Peak	Spacewatch	NYS	820 m	MPC · JPL
466535	2014 SP_{119}	—	February 27, 2006	Kitt Peak	Spacewatch	·	1.7 km	MPC · JPL
466536	2014 SR_{123}	—	October 8, 2007	Mount Lemmon	Mount Lemmon Survey	·	710 m	MPC · JPL
466537	2014 SH_{147}	—	October 18, 2011	Mount Lemmon	Mount Lemmon Survey	·	570 m	MPC · JPL
466538	2014 SR_{154}	—	March 10, 2003	Kitt Peak	Spacewatch	·	610 m	MPC · JPL
466539	2014 SA_{158}	—	October 8, 2004	Kitt Peak	Spacewatch	·	630 m	MPC · JPL
466540	2014 SY_{160}	—	September 27, 2006	Catalina	CSS	H	540 m	MPC · JPL
466541	2014 SD_{212}	—	November 17, 2009	Catalina	CSS	·	3.2 km	MPC · JPL
466542	2014 SD_{225}	—	March 27, 2008	Mount Lemmon	Mount Lemmon Survey	H	410 m	MPC · JPL
466543	2014 SO_{226}	—	February 3, 2009	Mount Lemmon	Mount Lemmon Survey	V	530 m	MPC · JPL
466544	2014 SD_{227}	—	February 1, 2006	Mount Lemmon	Mount Lemmon Survey	·	3.4 km	MPC · JPL
466545	2014 SM_{233}	—	October 3, 2006	Mount Lemmon	Mount Lemmon Survey	(5)	910 m	MPC · JPL
466546	2014 SN_{287}	—	September 14, 1994	Kitt Peak	Spacewatch	·	570 m	MPC · JPL
466547	2014 SD_{291}	—	February 21, 1995	Kitt Peak	Spacewatch	·	750 m	MPC · JPL
466548	2014 SJ_{299}	—	May 2, 2010	WISE	WISE	·	2.8 km	MPC · JPL
466549	2014 SK_{301}	—	March 2, 2010	WISE	WISE	·	1.9 km	MPC · JPL
466550	2014 SX_{307}	—	August 12, 2007	XuYi	PMO NEO Survey Program	·	710 m	MPC · JPL
466551	2014 SN_{310}	—	October 10, 2004	Kitt Peak	Spacewatch	·	500 m	MPC · JPL
466552 Viking	2014 SS_{310}	Viking	September 16, 2009	Mount Lemmon	Mount Lemmon Survey	DOR	2.2 km	MPC · JPL
466553	2014 SZ_{318}	—	November 18, 2006	Kitt Peak	Spacewatch	·	940 m	MPC · JPL
466554	2014 SP_{319}	—	June 15, 2010	Mount Lemmon	Mount Lemmon Survey	·	1.2 km	MPC · JPL
466555	2014 SR_{320}	—	March 10, 1999	Kitt Peak	Spacewatch	·	1.3 km	MPC · JPL
466556	2014 SB_{323}	—	November 3, 2004	Kitt Peak	Spacewatch	·	750 m	MPC · JPL
466557	2014 SG_{330}	—	September 17, 2003	Kitt Peak	Spacewatch	·	850 m	MPC · JPL
466558	2014 SL_{333}	—	September 19, 1998	Kitt Peak	Spacewatch	·	650 m	MPC · JPL
466559	2014 SO_{338}	—	October 21, 2003	Kitt Peak	Spacewatch	ERI	1.1 km	MPC · JPL
466560	2014 TQ_{13}	—	September 18, 2003	Kitt Peak	Spacewatch	EOS	1.9 km	MPC · JPL
466561	2014 TJ_{15}	—	September 16, 2010	Mount Lemmon	Mount Lemmon Survey	PHO	810 m	MPC · JPL
466562	2014 TJ_{16}	—	February 26, 2007	Mount Lemmon	Mount Lemmon Survey	(18466)	2.0 km	MPC · JPL
466563	2014 TJ_{23}	—	February 3, 2008	Mount Lemmon	Mount Lemmon Survey	·	1.1 km	MPC · JPL
466564	2014 TA_{27}	—	April 4, 2008	Catalina	CSS	·	1.1 km	MPC · JPL
466565	2014 TQ_{59}	—	January 25, 2007	Kitt Peak	Spacewatch	·	1.1 km	MPC · JPL
466566	2014 TX_{64}	—	January 29, 2007	Kitt Peak	Spacewatch	·	2.0 km	MPC · JPL
466567	2014 TO_{68}	—	April 1, 2012	Mount Lemmon	Mount Lemmon Survey	·	1.5 km	MPC · JPL
466568	2014 UM_{4}	—	November 18, 2003	Kitt Peak	Spacewatch	·	2.5 km	MPC · JPL
466569	2014 UP_{4}	—	January 12, 2010	Catalina	CSS	·	3.5 km	MPC · JPL
466570	2014 UU_{4}	—	September 13, 2005	Kitt Peak	Spacewatch	·	1.2 km	MPC · JPL
466571	2014 UU_{16}	—	October 28, 2006	Kitt Peak	Spacewatch	·	830 m	MPC · JPL
466572	2014 UX_{19}	—	March 13, 2010	WISE	WISE	·	2.9 km	MPC · JPL
466573	2014 UU_{21}	—	October 18, 2003	Anderson Mesa	LONEOS	·	2.3 km	MPC · JPL
466574	2014 UD_{24}	—	October 27, 2005	Anderson Mesa	LONEOS	·	1.7 km	MPC · JPL
466575	2014 UW_{24}	—	November 20, 2003	Socorro	LINEAR	·	4.2 km	MPC · JPL
466576	2014 UR_{27}	—	March 24, 2001	Kitt Peak	Spacewatch	V	690 m	MPC · JPL
466577	2014 UX_{41}	—	October 23, 1998	Kitt Peak	Spacewatch	·	550 m	MPC · JPL
466578	2014 UC_{53}	—	January 27, 2011	Kitt Peak	Spacewatch	HOF	2.1 km	MPC · JPL
466579	2014 UO_{65}	—	September 26, 2007	Mount Lemmon	Mount Lemmon Survey	V	580 m	MPC · JPL
466580	2014 UD_{68}	—	October 5, 2004	Kitt Peak	Spacewatch	·	650 m	MPC · JPL
466581	2014 UK_{83}	—	October 11, 2007	Mount Lemmon	Mount Lemmon Survey	·	670 m	MPC · JPL
466582	2014 UD_{84}	—	January 2, 2011	Mount Lemmon	Mount Lemmon Survey	·	1.4 km	MPC · JPL
466583	2014 UP_{84}	—	October 24, 2009	Kitt Peak	Spacewatch	·	1.5 km	MPC · JPL
466584	2014 UC_{93}	—	December 19, 2007	Mount Lemmon	Mount Lemmon Survey	·	1.0 km	MPC · JPL
466585	2014 UH_{99}	—	January 1, 2008	Kitt Peak	Spacewatch	·	1.3 km	MPC · JPL
466586	2014 UE_{101}	—	October 10, 2007	Kitt Peak	Spacewatch	·	770 m	MPC · JPL
466587	2014 UA_{105}	—	March 3, 2005	Kitt Peak	Spacewatch	·	3.0 km	MPC · JPL
466588	2014 UH_{109}	—	February 1, 2005	Kitt Peak	Spacewatch	·	950 m	MPC · JPL
466589	2014 UA_{114}	—	April 13, 2012	Mount Lemmon	Mount Lemmon Survey	·	1.8 km	MPC · JPL
466590	2014 UT_{117}	—	December 29, 2005	Socorro	LINEAR	DOR	2.6 km	MPC · JPL
466591	2014 US_{118}	—	December 3, 2010	Mount Lemmon	Mount Lemmon Survey	·	2.0 km	MPC · JPL
466592	2014 UT_{121}	—	January 3, 2000	Kitt Peak	Spacewatch	·	1.4 km	MPC · JPL
466593	2014 UT_{124}	—	December 18, 2003	Kitt Peak	Spacewatch	·	1.2 km	MPC · JPL
466594	2014 UF_{144}	—	September 17, 2003	Kitt Peak	Spacewatch	·	1.8 km	MPC · JPL
466595	2014 UF_{164}	—	June 11, 2008	Kitt Peak	Spacewatch	·	1.9 km	MPC · JPL
466596	2014 UK_{169}	—	February 9, 2008	Catalina	CSS	·	1.1 km	MPC · JPL
466597	2014 UF_{170}	—	November 5, 2007	Kitt Peak	Spacewatch	·	840 m	MPC · JPL
466598	2014 UL_{178}	—	March 29, 2009	Mount Lemmon	Mount Lemmon Survey	·	660 m	MPC · JPL
466599	2014 UZ_{184}	—	April 30, 2006	Kitt Peak	Spacewatch	·	4.1 km	MPC · JPL
466600	2014 UB_{185}	—	October 31, 2006	Mount Lemmon	Mount Lemmon Survey	·	1.1 km	MPC · JPL

== 466601–466700 ==
back to top

Designation			Discovery			Properties		Ref
Permanent	Provisional	Named after	Date	Site	Discoverer(s)	Category	Diam.	Ref
466601	2014 UC_{193}	—	September 6, 2004	Siding Spring	SSS	·	660 m	MPC · JPL
466602	2014 UD_{193}	—	April 5, 2005	Mount Lemmon	Mount Lemmon Survey	H	500 m	MPC · JPL
466603	2014 UW_{199}	—	December 14, 2010	Mount Lemmon	Mount Lemmon Survey	RAF	1.1 km	MPC · JPL
466604	2014 UH_{204}	—	December 14, 2010	Mount Lemmon	Mount Lemmon Survey	(5)	1.2 km	MPC · JPL
466605	2014 UP_{204}	—	January 24, 2007	Kitt Peak	Spacewatch	·	1.3 km	MPC · JPL
466606	2014 UF_{208}	—	December 14, 2007	Mount Lemmon	Mount Lemmon Survey	·	1.1 km	MPC · JPL
466607	2014 UN_{208}	—	October 18, 2010	Kitt Peak	Spacewatch	·	1.1 km	MPC · JPL
466608	2014 US_{209}	—	October 27, 2008	Kitt Peak	Spacewatch	T_{j} (2.99)	3.1 km	MPC · JPL
466609	2014 UZ_{215}	—	January 16, 2005	Socorro	LINEAR	·	2.2 km	MPC · JPL
466610	2014 UB_{217}	—	November 13, 2006	Catalina	CSS	·	1.8 km	MPC · JPL
466611	2014 VU_{3}	—	September 5, 2008	Kitt Peak	Spacewatch	·	3.5 km	MPC · JPL
466612	2014 VZ_{5}	—	September 11, 2010	Kitt Peak	Spacewatch	·	1.3 km	MPC · JPL
466613	2014 VA_{11}	—	October 19, 2003	Kitt Peak	Spacewatch	·	2.6 km	MPC · JPL
466614	2014 VL_{12}	—	October 19, 1999	Kitt Peak	Spacewatch	NYS	1.2 km	MPC · JPL
466615	2014 VF_{15}	—	March 10, 2008	Mount Lemmon	Mount Lemmon Survey	·	1.1 km	MPC · JPL
466616	2014 VG_{15}	—	November 18, 2008	Kitt Peak	Spacewatch	·	1.5 km	MPC · JPL
466617	2014 VD_{17}	—	March 6, 2010	WISE	WISE	·	1.8 km	MPC · JPL
466618	2014 VS_{18}	—	November 7, 2007	Kitt Peak	Spacewatch	·	1.0 km	MPC · JPL
466619	2014 VY_{19}	—	December 15, 2006	Kitt Peak	Spacewatch	·	1.1 km	MPC · JPL
466620	2014 VU_{22}	—	January 10, 2008	Mount Lemmon	Mount Lemmon Survey	MAS	800 m	MPC · JPL
466621	2014 VH_{24}	—	March 16, 2007	Kitt Peak	Spacewatch	AGN	1.3 km	MPC · JPL
466622	2014 VV_{24}	—	October 1, 2005	Kitt Peak	Spacewatch	·	1.2 km	MPC · JPL
466623	2014 VJ_{28}	—	April 19, 2010	WISE	WISE	·	2.6 km	MPC · JPL
466624	2014 VK_{34}	—	September 10, 2007	Kitt Peak	Spacewatch	·	600 m	MPC · JPL
466625	2014 WF	—	November 17, 2006	Catalina	CSS	H	670 m	MPC · JPL
466626	2014 WO	—	January 16, 2005	Socorro	LINEAR	·	2.7 km	MPC · JPL
466627	2014 WU_{6}	—	October 4, 1997	Kitt Peak	Spacewatch	·	1.4 km	MPC · JPL
466628	2014 WF_{14}	—	October 10, 2010	Kitt Peak	Spacewatch	·	1.1 km	MPC · JPL
466629	2014 WG_{17}	—	January 15, 2008	Kitt Peak	Spacewatch	·	1.0 km	MPC · JPL
466630	2014 WE_{19}	—	February 10, 2010	Kitt Peak	Spacewatch	CYB	2.7 km	MPC · JPL
466631	2014 WL_{19}	—	December 16, 2009	Mount Lemmon	Mount Lemmon Survey	·	1.7 km	MPC · JPL
466632	2014 WZ_{19}	—	September 9, 2007	Kitt Peak	Spacewatch	·	630 m	MPC · JPL
466633	2014 WZ_{22}	—	December 21, 2006	Kitt Peak	Spacewatch	·	1.0 km	MPC · JPL
466634	2014 WU_{23}	—	December 4, 1996	Kitt Peak	Spacewatch	V	570 m	MPC · JPL
466635	2014 WH_{24}	—	September 28, 2003	Kitt Peak	Spacewatch	·	2.9 km	MPC · JPL
466636	2014 WX_{27}	—	November 30, 2003	Kitt Peak	Spacewatch	CLA	1.2 km	MPC · JPL
466637	2014 WA_{45}	—	February 7, 2006	Kitt Peak	Spacewatch	·	1.7 km	MPC · JPL
466638	2014 WJ_{45}	—	December 14, 2003	Kitt Peak	Spacewatch	·	1.1 km	MPC · JPL
466639	2014 WO_{46}	—	October 27, 2005	Kitt Peak	Spacewatch	·	1.4 km	MPC · JPL
466640	2014 WP_{46}	—	February 1, 2006	Kitt Peak	Spacewatch	KOR	1.3 km	MPC · JPL
466641	2014 WM_{48}	—	December 30, 2007	Mount Lemmon	Mount Lemmon Survey	·	1.4 km	MPC · JPL
466642	2014 WR_{49}	—	October 3, 2003	Kitt Peak	Spacewatch	·	2.5 km	MPC · JPL
466643	2014 WX_{51}	—	December 30, 2008	Kitt Peak	Spacewatch	·	590 m	MPC · JPL
466644	2014 WY_{51}	—	October 14, 2007	Mount Lemmon	Mount Lemmon Survey	·	710 m	MPC · JPL
466645	2014 WP_{52}	—	December 1, 2003	Kitt Peak	Spacewatch	·	2.1 km	MPC · JPL
466646	2014 WU_{52}	—	September 22, 2008	Kitt Peak	Spacewatch	·	2.5 km	MPC · JPL
466647	2014 WL_{54}	—	March 31, 2009	Mount Lemmon	Mount Lemmon Survey	·	1.3 km	MPC · JPL
466648	2014 WK_{55}	—	August 13, 2007	XuYi	PMO NEO Survey Program	·	730 m	MPC · JPL
466649	2014 WN_{61}	—	December 13, 2006	Mount Lemmon	Mount Lemmon Survey	(5)	1.1 km	MPC · JPL
466650	2014 WX_{63}	—	August 10, 2007	Kitt Peak	Spacewatch	·	610 m	MPC · JPL
466651	2014 WY_{67}	—	January 12, 1996	Kitt Peak	Spacewatch	·	690 m	MPC · JPL
466652	2014 WE_{68}	—	December 8, 1999	Kitt Peak	Spacewatch	·	1.6 km	MPC · JPL
466653	2014 WC_{71}	—	August 8, 2004	Socorro	LINEAR	·	780 m	MPC · JPL
466654	2014 WJ_{75}	—	November 6, 2010	Mount Lemmon	Mount Lemmon Survey	·	1.1 km	MPC · JPL
466655	2014 WT_{76}	—	April 6, 2008	Kitt Peak	Spacewatch	·	780 m	MPC · JPL
466656	2014 WV_{77}	—	December 17, 2007	Mount Lemmon	Mount Lemmon Survey	V	620 m	MPC · JPL
466657	2014 WM_{80}	—	December 15, 2007	Kitt Peak	Spacewatch	·	830 m	MPC · JPL
466658	2014 WJ_{96}	—	October 14, 1998	Kitt Peak	Spacewatch	·	3.2 km	MPC · JPL
466659	2014 WA_{104}	—	October 14, 2010	Mount Lemmon	Mount Lemmon Survey	·	1.0 km	MPC · JPL
466660	2014 WX_{108}	—	April 15, 2013	Mount Lemmon	Mount Lemmon Survey	·	640 m	MPC · JPL
466661	2014 WS_{117}	—	September 6, 2008	Mount Lemmon	Mount Lemmon Survey	·	2.5 km	MPC · JPL
466662	2014 WV_{118}	—	November 13, 2006	Kitt Peak	Spacewatch	·	890 m	MPC · JPL
466663	2014 WQ_{124}	—	January 3, 2012	Mount Lemmon	Mount Lemmon Survey	·	1.4 km	MPC · JPL
466664	2014 WK_{125}	—	February 23, 2007	Mount Lemmon	Mount Lemmon Survey	·	1.4 km	MPC · JPL
466665	2014 WY_{140}	—	November 27, 2010	Mount Lemmon	Mount Lemmon Survey	·	880 m	MPC · JPL
466666	2014 WT_{143}	—	October 18, 2003	Kitt Peak	Spacewatch	EOS	1.4 km	MPC · JPL
466667	2014 WE_{160}	—	November 11, 2006	Mount Lemmon	Mount Lemmon Survey	·	1.4 km	MPC · JPL
466668	2014 WP_{165}	—	January 13, 2010	Catalina	CSS	·	2.8 km	MPC · JPL
466669	2014 WW_{183}	—	January 30, 2011	Kitt Peak	Spacewatch	·	2.0 km	MPC · JPL
466670	2014 WY_{184}	—	January 11, 2010	Kitt Peak	Spacewatch	·	3.1 km	MPC · JPL
466671	2014 WB_{192}	—	June 16, 2004	Kitt Peak	Spacewatch	·	2.1 km	MPC · JPL
466672	2014 WZ_{193}	—	September 29, 2005	Mount Lemmon	Mount Lemmon Survey	·	1.5 km	MPC · JPL
466673	2014 WE_{196}	—	October 23, 2003	Kitt Peak	Spacewatch	V	560 m	MPC · JPL
466674	2014 WD_{200}	—	April 10, 2005	Mount Lemmon	Mount Lemmon Survey	·	2.8 km	MPC · JPL
466675	2014 WH_{201}	—	November 26, 1997	Socorro	LINEAR	·	1.9 km	MPC · JPL
466676	2014 WM_{213}	—	October 29, 2005	Mount Lemmon	Mount Lemmon Survey	·	1.6 km	MPC · JPL
466677	2014 WG_{217}	—	September 25, 2006	Kitt Peak	Spacewatch	·	1.4 km	MPC · JPL
466678	2014 WD_{233}	—	January 19, 2005	Kitt Peak	Spacewatch	·	2.0 km	MPC · JPL
466679	2014 WG_{236}	—	September 18, 2009	Kitt Peak	Spacewatch	·	1.7 km	MPC · JPL
466680	2014 WV_{236}	—	January 20, 2009	Mount Lemmon	Mount Lemmon Survey	·	610 m	MPC · JPL
466681	2014 WB_{241}	—	May 26, 2003	Kitt Peak	Spacewatch	ADE	1.8 km	MPC · JPL
466682	2014 WD_{245}	—	November 8, 2010	Kitt Peak	Spacewatch	·	1.1 km	MPC · JPL
466683	2014 WX_{260}	—	May 10, 2005	Kitt Peak	Spacewatch	·	1.2 km	MPC · JPL
466684	2014 WJ_{270}	—	December 13, 2010	Kitt Peak	Spacewatch	·	1.2 km	MPC · JPL
466685	2014 WG_{272}	—	October 25, 2005	Kitt Peak	Spacewatch	WIT	720 m	MPC · JPL
466686	2014 WB_{286}	—	September 15, 2009	Kitt Peak	Spacewatch	HOF	2.1 km	MPC · JPL
466687	2014 WR_{294}	—	June 14, 2007	Kitt Peak	Spacewatch	·	2.4 km	MPC · JPL
466688	2014 WK_{296}	—	November 19, 2009	Mount Lemmon	Mount Lemmon Survey	·	2.4 km	MPC · JPL
466689	2014 WW_{296}	—	January 15, 2005	Kitt Peak	Spacewatch	·	1.8 km	MPC · JPL
466690	2014 WW_{310}	—	December 5, 2005	Mount Lemmon	Mount Lemmon Survey	HOF	2.3 km	MPC · JPL
466691	2014 WO_{311}	—	February 8, 2007	Mount Lemmon	Mount Lemmon Survey	·	1.3 km	MPC · JPL
466692	2014 WY_{324}	—	September 26, 2005	Kitt Peak	Spacewatch	·	1.6 km	MPC · JPL
466693	2014 WB_{332}	—	January 18, 2009	Mount Lemmon	Mount Lemmon Survey	·	710 m	MPC · JPL
466694	2014 WB_{353}	—	November 20, 2006	Mount Lemmon	Mount Lemmon Survey	(5)	900 m	MPC · JPL
466695	2014 WQ_{353}	—	January 15, 2008	Kitt Peak	Spacewatch	·	1.2 km	MPC · JPL
466696	2014 WN_{355}	—	October 25, 2013	Mount Lemmon	Mount Lemmon Survey	·	3.2 km	MPC · JPL
466697	2014 WP_{361}	—	March 5, 2008	Mount Lemmon	Mount Lemmon Survey	NYS	1.0 km	MPC · JPL
466698	2014 WL_{379}	—	December 1, 2003	Kitt Peak	Spacewatch	·	3.4 km	MPC · JPL
466699	2014 WF_{382}	—	March 10, 2011	Mount Lemmon	Mount Lemmon Survey	·	2.0 km	MPC · JPL
466700	2014 WW_{382}	—	April 28, 2012	Mount Lemmon	Mount Lemmon Survey	·	2.2 km	MPC · JPL

== 466701–466800 ==
back to top

Designation			Discovery			Properties		Ref
Permanent	Provisional	Named after	Date	Site	Discoverer(s)	Category	Diam.	Ref
466701	2014 WN_{401}	—	October 27, 2009	Mount Lemmon	Mount Lemmon Survey	·	1.5 km	MPC · JPL
466702	2014 WD_{403}	—	April 28, 2012	Mount Lemmon	Mount Lemmon Survey	ADE	1.6 km	MPC · JPL
466703	2014 WN_{406}	—	April 20, 2012	Kitt Peak	Spacewatch	·	1.5 km	MPC · JPL
466704	2014 WY_{410}	—	September 23, 2008	Mount Lemmon	Mount Lemmon Survey	HYG	2.2 km	MPC · JPL
466705	2014 WP_{412}	—	January 7, 2002	Kitt Peak	Spacewatch	·	790 m	MPC · JPL
466706	2014 WQ_{432}	—	November 5, 1996	Kitt Peak	Spacewatch	·	1.7 km	MPC · JPL
466707	2014 WG_{444}	—	May 5, 2013	Mount Lemmon	Mount Lemmon Survey	·	900 m	MPC · JPL
466708	2014 WF_{445}	—	December 16, 2009	Mount Lemmon	Mount Lemmon Survey	·	2.3 km	MPC · JPL
466709	2014 WL_{446}	—	November 21, 2005	Kitt Peak	Spacewatch	·	1.4 km	MPC · JPL
466710	2014 WJ_{459}	—	January 1, 2008	Kitt Peak	Spacewatch	·	1.2 km	MPC · JPL
466711	2014 WH_{462}	—	October 20, 2003	Kitt Peak	Spacewatch	MAS	680 m	MPC · JPL
466712	2014 WV_{465}	—	March 10, 2005	Catalina	CSS	·	2.6 km	MPC · JPL
466713	2014 WB_{470}	—	January 26, 2011	Mount Lemmon	Mount Lemmon Survey	·	1.4 km	MPC · JPL
466714	2014 WZ_{485}	—	November 25, 2005	Catalina	CSS	·	1.4 km	MPC · JPL
466715	2014 WF_{486}	—	December 8, 2010	Kitt Peak	Spacewatch	·	1.1 km	MPC · JPL
466716	2014 WJ_{488}	—	October 8, 2007	Mount Lemmon	Mount Lemmon Survey	·	600 m	MPC · JPL
466717	2014 WQ_{489}	—	October 1, 2003	Anderson Mesa	LONEOS	·	2.7 km	MPC · JPL
466718	2014 WY_{491}	—	December 17, 2003	Socorro	LINEAR	·	2.8 km	MPC · JPL
466719	2014 WB_{494}	—	January 12, 2010	WISE	WISE	·	3.2 km	MPC · JPL
466720	2014 WX_{494}	—	February 28, 2006	Mount Lemmon	Mount Lemmon Survey	DOR	3.1 km	MPC · JPL
466721	2014 WN_{495}	—	September 18, 1995	Kitt Peak	Spacewatch	·	3.2 km	MPC · JPL
466722	2014 WY_{495}	—	September 19, 2001	Socorro	LINEAR	·	3.8 km	MPC · JPL
466723	2014 WA_{501}	—	March 24, 2009	Mount Lemmon	Mount Lemmon Survey	·	1.2 km	MPC · JPL
466724	2014 WK_{503}	—	October 1, 2008	Catalina	CSS	·	3.7 km	MPC · JPL
466725	2014 XD_{7}	—	March 7, 2005	Socorro	LINEAR	·	3.9 km	MPC · JPL
466726	2014 XX_{33}	—	December 10, 2006	Kitt Peak	Spacewatch	·	850 m	MPC · JPL
466727	2014 XV_{36}	—	December 3, 2007	Kitt Peak	Spacewatch	·	1.2 km	MPC · JPL
466728	2014 YS_{16}	—	October 14, 1998	Kitt Peak	Spacewatch	·	1.4 km	MPC · JPL
466729	2014 YK_{22}	—	January 25, 2006	Kitt Peak	Spacewatch	HOF	2.6 km	MPC · JPL
466730	2014 YR_{22}	—	January 21, 2004	Socorro	LINEAR	EOS	3.2 km	MPC · JPL
466731	2014 YX_{23}	—	December 6, 2005	Kitt Peak	Spacewatch	·	2.0 km	MPC · JPL
466732	2014 YM_{25}	—	October 27, 2009	Mount Lemmon	Mount Lemmon Survey	·	5.0 km	MPC · JPL
466733	2014 YO_{26}	—	September 20, 1998	Kitt Peak	Spacewatch	·	1.5 km	MPC · JPL
466734	2014 YN_{36}	—	February 14, 2005	Kitt Peak	Spacewatch	EOS	1.7 km	MPC · JPL
466735	2014 YL_{41}	—	June 16, 2010	WISE	WISE	·	3.8 km	MPC · JPL
466736	2014 YP_{41}	—	February 22, 1998	Kitt Peak	Spacewatch	·	3.0 km	MPC · JPL
466737	2014 YM_{49}	—	January 21, 2009	Mount Lemmon	Mount Lemmon Survey	URS	3.5 km	MPC · JPL
466738	2015 AS	—	February 7, 2008	Mount Lemmon	Mount Lemmon Survey	·	1.3 km	MPC · JPL
466739	2015 AS_{3}	—	October 21, 2008	Kitt Peak	Spacewatch	·	2.9 km	MPC · JPL
466740	2015 AN_{11}	—	October 26, 2005	Kitt Peak	Spacewatch	·	1.6 km	MPC · JPL
466741	2015 AO_{12}	—	January 1, 2009	Mount Lemmon	Mount Lemmon Survey	·	3.9 km	MPC · JPL
466742	2015 AB_{15}	—	April 13, 2011	Mount Lemmon	Mount Lemmon Survey	·	3.8 km	MPC · JPL
466743	2015 AA_{23}	—	December 24, 2006	Catalina	CSS	·	1.3 km	MPC · JPL
466744	2015 AQ_{24}	—	March 10, 2005	Mount Lemmon	Mount Lemmon Survey	·	890 m	MPC · JPL
466745	2015 AU_{33}	—	March 24, 2006	Mount Lemmon	Mount Lemmon Survey	·	1.8 km	MPC · JPL
466746	2015 AZ_{36}	—	December 30, 2008	Kitt Peak	Spacewatch	·	3.1 km	MPC · JPL
466747	2015 AX_{38}	—	November 18, 2008	Kitt Peak	Spacewatch	·	3.3 km	MPC · JPL
466748	2015 AD_{41}	—	November 16, 2009	Mount Lemmon	Mount Lemmon Survey	·	1.7 km	MPC · JPL
466749	2015 AY_{94}	—	October 1, 2005	Kitt Peak	Spacewatch	·	1.7 km	MPC · JPL
466750	2015 AQ_{106}	—	November 19, 2009	Kitt Peak	Spacewatch	AGN	1.2 km	MPC · JPL
466751	2015 AA_{107}	—	October 27, 2008	Kitt Peak	Spacewatch	·	2.1 km	MPC · JPL
466752	2015 AJ_{112}	—	April 24, 2006	Kitt Peak	Spacewatch	KOR	1.4 km	MPC · JPL
466753	2015 AE_{116}	—	January 23, 2006	Kitt Peak	Spacewatch	AGN	1.3 km	MPC · JPL
466754	2015 AZ_{118}	—	September 6, 2008	Mount Lemmon	Mount Lemmon Survey	AGN	1.1 km	MPC · JPL
466755	2015 AY_{129}	—	September 10, 2007	Catalina	CSS	EOS	2.0 km	MPC · JPL
466756	2015 AQ_{131}	—	December 21, 2003	Kitt Peak	Spacewatch	EOS	1.8 km	MPC · JPL
466757	2015 AC_{133}	—	December 25, 2005	Kitt Peak	Spacewatch	·	1.5 km	MPC · JPL
466758	2015 AU_{133}	—	May 20, 2012	Mount Lemmon	Mount Lemmon Survey	EOS	1.7 km	MPC · JPL
466759	2015 AX_{133}	—	August 21, 2004	Siding Spring	SSS	·	1.7 km	MPC · JPL
466760	2015 AE_{138}	—	March 14, 2007	Mount Lemmon	Mount Lemmon Survey	·	1.7 km	MPC · JPL
466761	2015 AE_{141}	—	October 10, 2005	Kitt Peak	Spacewatch	·	1.1 km	MPC · JPL
466762	2015 AP_{143}	—	May 19, 2012	Mount Lemmon	Mount Lemmon Survey	·	1.4 km	MPC · JPL
466763	2015 AM_{145}	—	April 12, 2011	Mount Lemmon	Mount Lemmon Survey	EOS	1.9 km	MPC · JPL
466764	2015 AD_{148}	—	October 24, 2003	Kitt Peak	Spacewatch	·	1.7 km	MPC · JPL
466765	2015 AR_{151}	—	January 8, 2010	Kitt Peak	Spacewatch	·	3.2 km	MPC · JPL
466766	2015 AD_{155}	—	March 16, 2005	Mount Lemmon	Mount Lemmon Survey	·	2.6 km	MPC · JPL
466767	2015 AU_{165}	—	March 8, 2005	Mount Lemmon	Mount Lemmon Survey	·	2.5 km	MPC · JPL
466768	2015 AU_{173}	—	January 15, 2004	Kitt Peak	Spacewatch	·	2.7 km	MPC · JPL
466769	2015 AG_{192}	—	March 19, 2007	Mount Lemmon	Mount Lemmon Survey	·	1.7 km	MPC · JPL
466770	2015 AS_{203}	—	September 12, 2007	Mount Lemmon	Mount Lemmon Survey	·	4.2 km	MPC · JPL
466771	2015 AF_{205}	—	January 24, 2006	Kitt Peak	Spacewatch	WIT	1.1 km	MPC · JPL
466772	2015 AL_{210}	—	February 10, 2007	Mount Lemmon	Mount Lemmon Survey	·	1.2 km	MPC · JPL
466773	2015 AY_{210}	—	March 26, 2011	Mount Lemmon	Mount Lemmon Survey	·	3.2 km	MPC · JPL
466774	2015 AG_{243}	—	December 30, 2008	Mount Lemmon	Mount Lemmon Survey	·	3.1 km	MPC · JPL
466775	2015 AK_{252}	—	January 19, 2004	Kitt Peak	Spacewatch	·	2.5 km	MPC · JPL
466776	2015 AV_{252}	—	March 16, 2007	Mount Lemmon	Mount Lemmon Survey	·	1.9 km	MPC · JPL
466777	2015 AV_{257}	—	February 1, 2006	Kitt Peak	Spacewatch	AGN	1.3 km	MPC · JPL
466778	2015 AN_{258}	—	March 14, 2007	Kitt Peak	Spacewatch	·	1.3 km	MPC · JPL
466779	2015 AD_{259}	—	September 9, 2007	Kitt Peak	Spacewatch	·	3.3 km	MPC · JPL
466780	2015 AV_{260}	—	March 29, 2011	Kitt Peak	Spacewatch	·	1.8 km	MPC · JPL
466781	2015 AH_{274}	—	May 21, 2006	Kitt Peak	Spacewatch	·	2.2 km	MPC · JPL
466782	2015 AO_{278}	—	April 11, 2005	Mount Lemmon	Mount Lemmon Survey	·	2.9 km	MPC · JPL
466783	2015 BM_{5}	—	November 15, 2010	Mount Lemmon	Mount Lemmon Survey	·	1.9 km	MPC · JPL
466784	2015 BH_{7}	—	September 17, 1996	Kitt Peak	Spacewatch	·	830 m	MPC · JPL
466785	2015 BV_{7}	—	September 11, 2007	Mount Lemmon	Mount Lemmon Survey	·	2.6 km	MPC · JPL
466786	2015 BY_{12}	—	August 17, 2009	Kitt Peak	Spacewatch	EUN	960 m	MPC · JPL
466787	2015 BO_{15}	—	September 6, 2013	Mount Lemmon	Mount Lemmon Survey	·	2.1 km	MPC · JPL
466788	2015 BW_{17}	—	February 19, 2001	Socorro	LINEAR	·	2.0 km	MPC · JPL
466789	2015 BS_{18}	—	February 11, 2008	Mount Lemmon	Mount Lemmon Survey	3:2	4.6 km	MPC · JPL
466790	2015 BZ_{21}	—	September 10, 2007	Kitt Peak	Spacewatch	EOS	2.0 km	MPC · JPL
466791	2015 BS_{23}	—	March 17, 2010	Kitt Peak	Spacewatch	·	3.2 km	MPC · JPL
466792	2015 BZ_{25}	—	December 30, 2013	Mount Lemmon	Mount Lemmon Survey	·	2.7 km	MPC · JPL
466793	2015 BE_{39}	—	November 7, 2008	Mount Lemmon	Mount Lemmon Survey	EOS	1.6 km	MPC · JPL
466794	2015 BT_{45}	—	October 17, 1995	Kitt Peak	Spacewatch	·	1.6 km	MPC · JPL
466795	2015 BV_{45}	—	November 30, 2003	Kitt Peak	Spacewatch	·	2.1 km	MPC · JPL
466796	2015 BA_{55}	—	October 7, 2004	Socorro	LINEAR	·	1.9 km	MPC · JPL
466797	2015 BS_{58}	—	March 9, 2011	Kitt Peak	Spacewatch	·	2.6 km	MPC · JPL
466798	2015 BL_{61}	—	October 2, 2003	Kitt Peak	Spacewatch	(16286)	2.1 km	MPC · JPL
466799	2015 BK_{62}	—	February 9, 2010	Kitt Peak	Spacewatch	·	2.7 km	MPC · JPL
466800	2015 BB_{69}	—	April 14, 2011	Mount Lemmon	Mount Lemmon Survey	EOS	1.9 km	MPC · JPL

== 466801–466900 ==
back to top

Designation			Discovery			Properties		Ref
Permanent	Provisional	Named after	Date	Site	Discoverer(s)	Category	Diam.	Ref
466801	2015 BZ_{72}	—	February 25, 2007	Mount Lemmon	Mount Lemmon Survey	RAF	980 m	MPC · JPL
466802	2015 BE_{78}	—	October 4, 2004	Kitt Peak	Spacewatch	·	1.7 km	MPC · JPL
466803	2015 BB_{82}	—	October 20, 2008	Kitt Peak	Spacewatch	EOS	2.4 km	MPC · JPL
466804	2015 BV_{85}	—	December 25, 2005	Mount Lemmon	Mount Lemmon Survey	·	2.6 km	MPC · JPL
466805	2015 BB_{87}	—	January 8, 2009	Kitt Peak	Spacewatch	·	3.2 km	MPC · JPL
466806	2015 BF_{88}	—	June 11, 2010	WISE	WISE	·	3.1 km	MPC · JPL
466807	2015 BY_{89}	—	November 10, 2005	Kitt Peak	Spacewatch	3:2	4.9 km	MPC · JPL
466808	2015 BO_{93}	—	April 2, 2005	Catalina	CSS	·	3.5 km	MPC · JPL
466809	2015 BA_{96}	—	May 1, 2010	WISE	WISE	·	3.2 km	MPC · JPL
466810	2015 BD_{99}	—	September 21, 2003	Kitt Peak	Spacewatch	KOR	1.4 km	MPC · JPL
466811	2015 BX_{99}	—	March 15, 2004	Kitt Peak	Spacewatch	HYG	3.9 km	MPC · JPL
466812	2015 BT_{120}	—	August 26, 2012	Mount Lemmon	Mount Lemmon Survey	VER	2.4 km	MPC · JPL
466813	2015 BF_{128}	—	October 8, 2008	Kitt Peak	Spacewatch	AGN	1.1 km	MPC · JPL
466814	2015 BA_{129}	—	March 31, 2003	Kitt Peak	Spacewatch	·	1.7 km	MPC · JPL
466815	2015 BE_{132}	—	December 16, 2009	Mount Lemmon	Mount Lemmon Survey	·	2.5 km	MPC · JPL
466816	2015 BK_{133}	—	November 10, 2004	Kitt Peak	Spacewatch	AGN	1.2 km	MPC · JPL
466817	2015 BS_{147}	—	December 16, 2007	Mount Lemmon	Mount Lemmon Survey	SYL · CYB	3.9 km	MPC · JPL
466818	2015 BU_{148}	—	January 11, 1994	Kitt Peak	Spacewatch	·	2.3 km	MPC · JPL
466819	2015 BX_{157}	—	November 1, 2008	Mount Lemmon	Mount Lemmon Survey	·	3.3 km	MPC · JPL
466820	2015 BW_{158}	—	September 20, 2008	Mount Lemmon	Mount Lemmon Survey	·	2.0 km	MPC · JPL
466821	2015 BL_{159}	—	March 4, 2011	Mount Lemmon	Mount Lemmon Survey	EUN	1.4 km	MPC · JPL
466822	2015 BN_{167}	—	September 29, 1997	Kitt Peak	Spacewatch	·	1.8 km	MPC · JPL
466823	2015 BX_{167}	—	October 9, 2007	Kitt Peak	Spacewatch	·	2.5 km	MPC · JPL
466824	2015 BP_{180}	—	September 25, 2006	Mount Lemmon	Mount Lemmon Survey	CYB	3.2 km	MPC · JPL
466825	2015 BK_{189}	—	March 6, 2011	Kitt Peak	Spacewatch	·	2.2 km	MPC · JPL
466826	2015 BG_{190}	—	December 17, 2003	Kitt Peak	Spacewatch	·	2.1 km	MPC · JPL
466827	2015 BH_{194}	—	August 16, 2007	XuYi	PMO NEO Survey Program	·	2.2 km	MPC · JPL
466828	2015 BV_{198}	—	April 16, 2005	Kitt Peak	Spacewatch	THM	2.5 km	MPC · JPL
466829	2015 BV_{203}	—	February 2, 2006	Mount Lemmon	Mount Lemmon Survey	·	1.7 km	MPC · JPL
466830	2015 BB_{204}	—	October 5, 2004	Kitt Peak	Spacewatch	·	1.7 km	MPC · JPL
466831	2015 BT_{212}	—	November 4, 2004	Kitt Peak	Spacewatch	·	2.0 km	MPC · JPL
466832	2015 BC_{215}	—	April 22, 2012	Kitt Peak	Spacewatch	·	2.6 km	MPC · JPL
466833	2015 BG_{216}	—	February 14, 2010	Mount Lemmon	Mount Lemmon Survey	EOS	1.7 km	MPC · JPL
466834	2015 BV_{218}	—	October 5, 2004	Kitt Peak	Spacewatch	·	1.9 km	MPC · JPL
466835	2015 BU_{223}	—	March 7, 2008	Kitt Peak	Spacewatch	3:2	3.7 km	MPC · JPL
466836	2015 BV_{224}	—	January 13, 2011	Mount Lemmon	Mount Lemmon Survey	·	880 m	MPC · JPL
466837	2015 BR_{228}	—	September 10, 2007	Kitt Peak	Spacewatch	·	2.3 km	MPC · JPL
466838	2015 BX_{230}	—	September 14, 2007	Kitt Peak	Spacewatch	EOS	1.9 km	MPC · JPL
466839	2015 BF_{244}	—	September 29, 2008	Mount Lemmon	Mount Lemmon Survey	·	2.0 km	MPC · JPL
466840	2015 BR_{244}	—	June 6, 2010	WISE	WISE	·	2.7 km	MPC · JPL
466841	2015 BL_{247}	—	September 7, 2004	Kitt Peak	Spacewatch	·	1.6 km	MPC · JPL
466842	2015 BZ_{248}	—	January 23, 2006	Mount Lemmon	Mount Lemmon Survey	·	2.2 km	MPC · JPL
466843	2015 BN_{249}	—	September 7, 2004	Kitt Peak	Spacewatch	·	1.8 km	MPC · JPL
466844	2015 BY_{249}	—	December 18, 2004	Mount Lemmon	Mount Lemmon Survey	·	1.9 km	MPC · JPL
466845	2015 BM_{256}	—	September 9, 2007	Kitt Peak	Spacewatch	·	2.4 km	MPC · JPL
466846	2015 BM_{259}	—	November 1, 2008	Kitt Peak	Spacewatch	·	1.7 km	MPC · JPL
466847	2015 BA_{274}	—	June 17, 2005	Mount Lemmon	Mount Lemmon Survey	MAR	1.3 km	MPC · JPL
466848	2015 BY_{280}	—	February 17, 2010	Kitt Peak	Spacewatch	·	3.0 km	MPC · JPL
466849	2015 BU_{281}	—	November 6, 2005	Mount Lemmon	Mount Lemmon Survey	·	1.6 km	MPC · JPL
466850	2015 BU_{284}	—	February 18, 2010	Mount Lemmon	Mount Lemmon Survey	·	3.1 km	MPC · JPL
466851	2015 BR_{292}	—	April 12, 2010	Mount Lemmon	Mount Lemmon Survey	·	4.0 km	MPC · JPL
466852	2015 BF_{293}	—	September 30, 2005	Mount Lemmon	Mount Lemmon Survey	·	960 m	MPC · JPL
466853	2015 BJ_{296}	—	March 18, 2004	Socorro	LINEAR	·	3.3 km	MPC · JPL
466854	2015 BK_{307}	—	June 3, 2011	Mount Lemmon	Mount Lemmon Survey	EOS	2.0 km	MPC · JPL
466855	2015 BK_{324}	—	June 5, 2006	Mount Lemmon	Mount Lemmon Survey	·	2.7 km	MPC · JPL
466856	2015 BX_{341}	—	April 25, 2007	Kitt Peak	Spacewatch	·	1.6 km	MPC · JPL
466857	2015 BG_{342}	—	November 2, 2008	Mount Lemmon	Mount Lemmon Survey	(31811)	3.3 km	MPC · JPL
466858	2015 BL_{345}	—	May 25, 2010	WISE	WISE	VER	3.3 km	MPC · JPL
466859	2015 BQ_{345}	—	November 24, 2008	Kitt Peak	Spacewatch	EOS	1.9 km	MPC · JPL
466860	2015 BP_{347}	—	October 20, 2003	Kitt Peak	Spacewatch	·	990 m	MPC · JPL
466861	2015 BJ_{350}	—	May 8, 2005	Kitt Peak	Spacewatch	·	3.2 km	MPC · JPL
466862	2015 BS_{362}	—	October 23, 2008	Kitt Peak	Spacewatch	·	2.1 km	MPC · JPL
466863	2015 BL_{367}	—	August 24, 2008	Kitt Peak	Spacewatch	·	2.5 km	MPC · JPL
466864	2015 BG_{390}	—	January 10, 2006	Kitt Peak	Spacewatch	·	1.8 km	MPC · JPL
466865	2015 BN_{394}	—	October 7, 2007	Kitt Peak	Spacewatch	·	3.2 km	MPC · JPL
466866	2015 BV_{413}	—	February 16, 2010	Kitt Peak	Spacewatch	TEL	1.5 km	MPC · JPL
466867	2015 BV_{472}	—	April 30, 2003	Kitt Peak	Spacewatch	·	1.6 km	MPC · JPL
466868	2015 BF_{476}	—	February 16, 2010	Kitt Peak	Spacewatch	EOS	2.0 km	MPC · JPL
466869	2015 BB_{484}	—	February 14, 2010	WISE	WISE	CYB	5.6 km	MPC · JPL
466870	2015 BV_{492}	—	September 4, 2007	Mount Lemmon	Mount Lemmon Survey	·	1.7 km	MPC · JPL
466871	2015 BH_{493}	—	August 24, 2007	Kitt Peak	Spacewatch	·	1.7 km	MPC · JPL
466872	2015 BU_{511}	—	December 20, 1995	Kitt Peak	Spacewatch	·	2.2 km	MPC · JPL
466873	2015 CN_{29}	—	January 6, 2010	Kitt Peak	Spacewatch	GEF	1.5 km	MPC · JPL
466874	2015 CG_{33}	—	September 12, 2007	Catalina	CSS	·	4.5 km	MPC · JPL
466875	2015 CC_{34}	—	November 19, 1995	Kitt Peak	Spacewatch	·	1.4 km	MPC · JPL
466876	2015 CS_{36}	—	September 19, 1995	Kitt Peak	Spacewatch	·	5.3 km	MPC · JPL
466877	2015 CD_{37}	—	January 20, 2009	Mount Lemmon	Mount Lemmon Survey	·	3.5 km	MPC · JPL
466878	2015 CU_{40}	—	February 10, 2002	Socorro	LINEAR	·	1.7 km	MPC · JPL
466879	2015 CL_{60}	—	November 19, 2008	Kitt Peak	Spacewatch	·	3.1 km	MPC · JPL
466880	2015 DY_{5}	—	January 18, 1998	Kitt Peak	Spacewatch	·	3.2 km	MPC · JPL
466881	2015 DO_{16}	—	April 2, 2006	Kitt Peak	Spacewatch	KOR	1.4 km	MPC · JPL
466882	2015 DK_{28}	—	June 3, 2005	Kitt Peak	Spacewatch	·	3.7 km	MPC · JPL
466883	2015 DG_{46}	—	February 2, 2009	Kitt Peak	Spacewatch	·	2.4 km	MPC · JPL
466884	2015 DG_{69}	—	October 19, 2007	Mount Lemmon	Mount Lemmon Survey	·	2.4 km	MPC · JPL
466885	2015 DJ_{79}	—	September 15, 2004	Anderson Mesa	LONEOS	·	1.6 km	MPC · JPL
466886	2015 DU_{97}	—	February 2, 2009	Mount Lemmon	Mount Lemmon Survey	·	2.9 km	MPC · JPL
466887	2015 DP_{100}	—	June 4, 2011	Mount Lemmon	Mount Lemmon Survey	·	3.5 km	MPC · JPL
466888	2015 DK_{112}	—	December 1, 2008	Kitt Peak	Spacewatch	·	2.6 km	MPC · JPL
466889	2015 DP_{112}	—	October 19, 2007	Catalina	CSS	·	3.4 km	MPC · JPL
466890	2015 DE_{113}	—	November 2, 2007	Mount Lemmon	Mount Lemmon Survey	·	3.4 km	MPC · JPL
466891	2015 DW_{145}	—	December 23, 2013	Mount Lemmon	Mount Lemmon Survey	HYG	3.2 km	MPC · JPL
466892	2015 DC_{146}	—	October 30, 2005	Kitt Peak	Spacewatch	·	1.1 km	MPC · JPL
466893	2015 DM_{147}	—	September 10, 2007	Mount Lemmon	Mount Lemmon Survey	VER	2.2 km	MPC · JPL
466894	2015 DR_{148}	—	December 19, 2003	Kitt Peak	Spacewatch	·	3.4 km	MPC · JPL
466895	2015 DS_{148}	—	November 9, 2004	Catalina	CSS	·	2.5 km	MPC · JPL
466896	2015 DY_{156}	—	January 23, 2006	Kitt Peak	Spacewatch	·	2.1 km	MPC · JPL
466897	2015 DA_{157}	—	December 27, 2005	Mount Lemmon	Mount Lemmon Survey	·	1.8 km	MPC · JPL
466898	2015 DF_{169}	—	May 24, 2010	WISE	WISE	·	5.4 km	MPC · JPL
466899	2015 DR_{173}	—	September 26, 2007	Mount Lemmon	Mount Lemmon Survey	EOS	2.2 km	MPC · JPL
466900	2015 EZ_{11}	—	October 9, 2004	Socorro	LINEAR	·	1.9 km	MPC · JPL

== 466901–467000 ==
back to top

Designation			Discovery			Properties		Ref
Permanent	Provisional	Named after	Date	Site	Discoverer(s)	Category	Diam.	Ref
466901	2015 EG_{13}	—	February 27, 2006	Kitt Peak	Spacewatch	·	2.1 km	MPC · JPL
466902	2015 EJ_{13}	—	November 6, 2008	Mount Lemmon	Mount Lemmon Survey	·	2.7 km	MPC · JPL
466903	2015 EE_{15}	—	September 12, 2001	Socorro	LINEAR	URS	3.3 km	MPC · JPL
466904	2015 ED_{17}	—	March 15, 2004	Kitt Peak	Spacewatch	·	3.9 km	MPC · JPL
466905	2015 EO_{17}	—	October 21, 2007	Mount Lemmon	Mount Lemmon Survey	·	3.3 km	MPC · JPL
466906	2015 EB_{19}	—	January 24, 2010	WISE	WISE	·	2.5 km	MPC · JPL
466907	2015 EL_{24}	—	March 13, 2010	Kitt Peak	Spacewatch	·	3.2 km	MPC · JPL
466908	2015 EW_{31}	—	December 28, 2000	Kitt Peak	Spacewatch	·	2.1 km	MPC · JPL
466909	2015 EM_{46}	—	October 8, 2005	Kitt Peak	Spacewatch	CYB	3.9 km	MPC · JPL
466910	2015 FA_{1}	—	September 23, 2008	Mount Lemmon	Mount Lemmon Survey	·	2.5 km	MPC · JPL
466911	2015 FZ_{1}	—	October 3, 2008	Mount Lemmon	Mount Lemmon Survey	·	2.3 km	MPC · JPL
466912	2015 FL_{2}	—	May 23, 2011	Mount Lemmon	Mount Lemmon Survey	·	2.4 km	MPC · JPL
466913	2015 FS_{2}	—	November 3, 2008	Mount Lemmon	Mount Lemmon Survey	·	1.8 km	MPC · JPL
466914	2015 FM_{3}	—	November 17, 2009	Mount Lemmon	Mount Lemmon Survey	·	3.0 km	MPC · JPL
466915	2015 FG_{319}	—	April 14, 2010	Kitt Peak	Spacewatch	·	2.8 km	MPC · JPL
466916	2015 HY_{5}	—	September 6, 2008	Kitt Peak	Spacewatch	L4	7.5 km	MPC · JPL
466917	2015 LW_{2}	—	November 8, 2010	Kitt Peak	Spacewatch	L4	10 km	MPC · JPL
466918	2015 TB_{107}	—	March 15, 2012	Mount Lemmon	Mount Lemmon Survey	EOS	1.8 km	MPC · JPL
466919	2015 UP_{66}	—	March 15, 2005	Catalina	CSS	MAR	1.5 km	MPC · JPL
466920	2015 WK_{10}	—	December 19, 2004	Catalina	CSS	·	2.9 km	MPC · JPL
466921	2015 XW_{68}	—	April 26, 2001	Kitt Peak	Spacewatch	·	3.1 km	MPC · JPL
466922	2015 XB_{168}	—	November 2, 2010	Mount Lemmon	Mount Lemmon Survey	JUN	850 m	MPC · JPL
466923	2015 XD_{168}	—	October 27, 2005	Mount Lemmon	Mount Lemmon Survey	·	2.6 km	MPC · JPL
466924	2015 YU_{4}	—	September 18, 2009	Kitt Peak	Spacewatch	·	2.2 km	MPC · JPL
466925	2015 YC_{9}	—	November 10, 2009	Kitt Peak	Spacewatch	EOS	2.3 km	MPC · JPL
466926	2016 AE	—	December 12, 2004	Campo Imperatore	CINEOS	NYS	1.3 km	MPC · JPL
466927	2016 AQ_{7}	—	January 18, 2005	Kitt Peak	Spacewatch	·	3.6 km	MPC · JPL
466928	2016 AP_{24}	—	November 26, 2009	Mount Lemmon	Mount Lemmon Survey	·	2.6 km	MPC · JPL
466929	2016 AF_{41}	—	September 19, 2009	Mount Lemmon	Mount Lemmon Survey	·	2.8 km	MPC · JPL
466930	2016 AL_{43}	—	December 8, 2010	Mount Lemmon	Mount Lemmon Survey	·	2.8 km	MPC · JPL
466931	2016 AV_{46}	—	December 1, 2005	Kitt Peak	Spacewatch	KOR	1.6 km	MPC · JPL
466932	2016 AN_{47}	—	March 8, 2008	Mount Lemmon	Mount Lemmon Survey	·	1.2 km	MPC · JPL
466933	2016 AF_{51}	—	February 2, 2005	Kitt Peak	Spacewatch	NYS	1.2 km	MPC · JPL
466934	2016 AR_{52}	—	November 30, 2010	Mount Lemmon	Mount Lemmon Survey	BRA	1.9 km	MPC · JPL
466935	2016 AO_{75}	—	August 7, 2008	Kitt Peak	Spacewatch	·	3.0 km	MPC · JPL
466936	2016 AF_{93}	—	February 13, 2007	Mount Lemmon	Mount Lemmon Survey	·	1.7 km	MPC · JPL
466937	2016 AC_{95}	—	October 4, 2003	Kitt Peak	Spacewatch	·	3.0 km	MPC · JPL
466938	2016 AZ_{113}	—	March 4, 2005	Mount Lemmon	Mount Lemmon Survey	·	820 m	MPC · JPL
466939	2016 AR_{117}	—	January 17, 2005	Kitt Peak	Spacewatch	·	1.1 km	MPC · JPL
466940	2016 AT_{120}	—	October 30, 2011	Mount Lemmon	Mount Lemmon Survey	·	1.7 km	MPC · JPL
466941	2016 AA_{124}	—	February 18, 2008	Mount Lemmon	Mount Lemmon Survey	·	1.1 km	MPC · JPL
466942	2016 AR_{126}	—	July 5, 2005	Kitt Peak	Spacewatch	MAR	1.1 km	MPC · JPL
466943	2016 AS_{126}	—	December 29, 2011	Mount Lemmon	Mount Lemmon Survey	·	1.1 km	MPC · JPL
466944	2016 AU_{126}	—	November 18, 2006	Mount Lemmon	Mount Lemmon Survey	RAF	790 m	MPC · JPL
466945	2016 AX_{126}	—	November 27, 2006	Mount Lemmon	Mount Lemmon Survey	·	1.9 km	MPC · JPL
466946	2016 AB_{127}	—	November 17, 1995	Kitt Peak	Spacewatch	GEF	1.4 km	MPC · JPL
466947	2016 AE_{127}	—	March 9, 2005	Mount Lemmon	Mount Lemmon Survey	·	3.2 km	MPC · JPL
466948	2016 AL_{127}	—	May 21, 2006	Catalina	CSS	·	3.4 km	MPC · JPL
466949	2016 AN_{127}	—	March 19, 2007	Mount Lemmon	Mount Lemmon Survey	·	2.1 km	MPC · JPL
466950	2016 AR_{127}	—	January 10, 2007	Kitt Peak	Spacewatch	·	1.7 km	MPC · JPL
466951	2016 AA_{128}	—	October 21, 2008	Kitt Peak	Spacewatch	·	3.4 km	MPC · JPL
466952	2016 AB_{128}	—	April 3, 2003	Anderson Mesa	LONEOS	JUN	990 m	MPC · JPL
466953	2016 AH_{128}	—	January 20, 2009	Catalina	CSS	CYB	4.7 km	MPC · JPL
466954	2016 AB_{129}	—	September 28, 2003	Kitt Peak	Spacewatch	EOS	1.8 km	MPC · JPL
466955	2016 AF_{129}	—	January 28, 2010	WISE	WISE	·	3.6 km	MPC · JPL
466956	2016 AO_{129}	—	August 30, 2005	Kitt Peak	Spacewatch	·	1.7 km	MPC · JPL
466957	2016 AX_{172}	—	January 15, 2010	WISE	WISE	·	2.5 km	MPC · JPL
466958	2016 AB_{173}	—	December 19, 2009	Kitt Peak	Spacewatch	·	4.5 km	MPC · JPL
466959	2016 AA_{179}	—	July 29, 2008	Kitt Peak	Spacewatch	·	2.9 km	MPC · JPL
466960	2016 AR_{180}	—	October 22, 2005	Catalina	CSS	·	1.9 km	MPC · JPL
466961	2016 AT_{183}	—	October 24, 2008	Kitt Peak	Spacewatch	·	3.5 km	MPC · JPL
466962	2016 AR_{185}	—	April 2, 2005	Siding Spring	SSS	PHO	1.3 km	MPC · JPL
466963	2016 AF_{187}	—	November 21, 2008	Kitt Peak	Spacewatch	·	1.2 km	MPC · JPL
466964	2016 AP_{187}	—	December 6, 2005	Mount Lemmon	Mount Lemmon Survey	·	710 m	MPC · JPL
466965	2016 AR_{187}	—	November 30, 2008	Mount Lemmon	Mount Lemmon Survey	·	870 m	MPC · JPL
466966	2016 AT_{192}	—	October 9, 1999	Socorro	LINEAR	H	570 m	MPC · JPL
466967	2016 BJ_{4}	—	September 14, 2005	Kitt Peak	Spacewatch	NEM	2.6 km	MPC · JPL
466968	2016 BP_{6}	—	February 17, 2007	Catalina	CSS	·	2.5 km	MPC · JPL
466969	2016 BQ_{7}	—	October 24, 2008	Catalina	CSS	EOS	2.5 km	MPC · JPL
466970	2016 BE_{8}	—	July 29, 2009	Kitt Peak	Spacewatch	·	1.5 km	MPC · JPL
466971	2016 BH_{8}	—	January 28, 2000	Kitt Peak	Spacewatch	·	3.6 km	MPC · JPL
466972	2016 BQ_{8}	—	October 1, 2008	Mount Lemmon	Mount Lemmon Survey	·	3.2 km	MPC · JPL
466973	2016 BR_{8}	—	December 19, 2003	Kitt Peak	Spacewatch	·	1.3 km	MPC · JPL
466974	2016 BN_{10}	—	May 16, 2009	Mount Lemmon	Mount Lemmon Survey	·	1.2 km	MPC · JPL
466975	2016 BK_{11}	—	March 31, 2008	Kitt Peak	Spacewatch	·	1.3 km	MPC · JPL
466976	2016 BM_{11}	—	October 11, 2007	Mount Lemmon	Mount Lemmon Survey	·	830 m	MPC · JPL
466977	2016 BH_{14}	—	November 13, 2007	Mount Lemmon	Mount Lemmon Survey	H	530 m	MPC · JPL
466978	2016 BV_{16}	—	February 2, 2005	Kitt Peak	Spacewatch	NYS	1.1 km	MPC · JPL
466979	2016 BC_{17}	—	February 2, 2008	Kitt Peak	Spacewatch	·	1.1 km	MPC · JPL
466980	2016 BE_{17}	—	September 27, 2003	Kitt Peak	Spacewatch	THM	1.9 km	MPC · JPL
466981	2016 BJ_{22}	—	January 30, 2009	Mount Lemmon	Mount Lemmon Survey	NYS	850 m	MPC · JPL
466982	2016 BU_{24}	—	January 28, 2000	Kitt Peak	Spacewatch	·	980 m	MPC · JPL
466983	2016 BZ_{29}	—	November 5, 2010	Mount Lemmon	Mount Lemmon Survey	EUN	1.5 km	MPC · JPL
466984	2016 BV_{33}	—	February 12, 2002	Kitt Peak	Spacewatch	KOR	1.4 km	MPC · JPL
466985	2016 BW_{33}	—	September 5, 2008	Kitt Peak	Spacewatch	EOS	2.1 km	MPC · JPL
466986	2016 BF_{39}	—	September 21, 2009	Kitt Peak	Spacewatch	H	490 m	MPC · JPL
466987	2016 BD_{46}	—	November 16, 2009	Kitt Peak	Spacewatch	·	2.9 km	MPC · JPL
466988	2016 BE_{51}	—	December 11, 2010	Mount Lemmon	Mount Lemmon Survey	·	2.5 km	MPC · JPL
466989	2016 BQ_{51}	—	November 25, 2005	Kitt Peak	Spacewatch	·	1.9 km	MPC · JPL
466990	2016 BN_{53}	—	January 13, 2005	Kitt Peak	Spacewatch	·	2.7 km	MPC · JPL
466991	2016 BT_{59}	—	January 3, 2009	Mount Lemmon	Mount Lemmon Survey	·	1.3 km	MPC · JPL
466992	2016 BY_{66}	—	October 20, 2006	Mount Lemmon	Mount Lemmon Survey	EUN	1.9 km	MPC · JPL
466993	2016 CQ_{4}	—	October 13, 2007	Catalina	CSS	·	1.3 km	MPC · JPL
466994	2016 CN_{18}	—	March 12, 2008	Kitt Peak	Spacewatch	·	1.8 km	MPC · JPL
466995	2016 CR_{18}	—	April 15, 2001	Kitt Peak	Spacewatch	·	1.4 km	MPC · JPL
466996	2016 CZ_{22}	—	January 16, 2008	Kitt Peak	Spacewatch	·	480 m	MPC · JPL
466997	2016 CO_{23}	—	March 11, 2005	Socorro	LINEAR	·	4.2 km	MPC · JPL
466998	2016 CU_{27}	—	February 16, 2010	Kitt Peak	Spacewatch	·	3.5 km	MPC · JPL
466999	2016 CX_{27}	—	September 19, 2007	Kitt Peak	Spacewatch	·	750 m	MPC · JPL
467000	2016 CL_{63}	—	May 12, 2012	Mount Lemmon	Mount Lemmon Survey	EOS	2.1 km	MPC · JPL

back to top

== Meaning of names ==
As minor planet discoveries are confirmed, they are given a permanent number by the IAU's Minor Planet Center (MPC), and the discoverers can then submit names for them, following the IAU's naming conventions. The list below concerns those minor planets in the specified number-range that have received names, and explains the meanings of those names.

Official naming citations of newly named small Solar System bodies are approved and published in a bulletin by IAU's Working Group for Small Bodies Nomenclature (WGSBN). Before May 2021, citations were published in MPC's Minor Planet Circulars for many decades. Recent citations can also be found on the JPL Small-Body Database (SBDB). Until his death in 2016, German astronomer Lutz D. Schmadel compiled these citations into the Dictionary of Minor Planet Names (DMP) and regularly updated the collection.

Based on Paul Herget's The Names of the Minor Planets, Schmadel also researched the unclear origin of numerous asteroids, most of which had been named prior to World War II. This article incorporates text from this source, which is in the public domain: SBDB New namings may only be added to this list below after official publication as the preannouncement of names is condemned. The WGSBN publishes a comprehensive guideline for the naming rules of non-cometary small Solar System bodies.

Named minor planet	Provisional	This minor planet was named for...	Ref · Catalog
466552 Viking	2014 SS_{310}	The Viking, The 1931 adventure movie.	IAU · 466552
