= List of minor planets: 491001–492000 =

The following is a partial list of minor planets, running from minor-planet number 491001 through 492000, inclusive. The primary data for this and other partial lists is based on JPL's "Small-Body Orbital Elements" and data available from the Minor Planet Center. Critical list information is also provided by the MPC, unless otherwise specified from Lowell Observatory. A detailed description of the table's columns and additional sources are given on the main page including a complete list of every page in this series, and a statistical break-up on the dynamical classification of minor planets.

Also see the summary list of all named bodies in numerical and alphabetical order, and the corresponding naming citations for the number range of this particular list. New namings may only be added to this list after official publication, as the preannouncement of names is condemned by the Working Group for Small Bodies Nomenclature of the International Astronomical Union.

Near-Earth obj.	MBA (inner)	MBA (outer)	Centaur
Mars-crosser	MBA (middle)	Jupiter trojan	Trans-Neptunian obj.
Unclassified

== 491001–491100 ==
Designation			Discovery			Properties		Ref
Permanent	Provisional	Named after	Date	Site	Discoverer(s)	Category	Diam.	Ref
491001	2011 GP_{7}	—	April 2, 2011	Mount Lemmon	Mount Lemmon Survey	·	1.1 km	MPC · JPL
491002	2011 GO_{9}	—	November 17, 2008	Kitt Peak	Spacewatch	·	3.7 km	MPC · JPL
491003	2011 GL_{26}	—	April 4, 2011	Mount Lemmon	Mount Lemmon Survey	VER	2.9 km	MPC · JPL
491004	2011 GH_{33}	—	April 3, 2011	Haleakala	Pan-STARRS 1	·	2.8 km	MPC · JPL
491005	2011 GC_{41}	—	February 1, 2005	Catalina	CSS	EOS	2.9 km	MPC · JPL
491006	2011 GG_{58}	—	August 14, 2007	Siding Spring	SSS	·	4.3 km	MPC · JPL
491007	2011 GL_{62}	—	April 13, 2011	Catalina	CSS	APO	440 m	MPC · JPL
491008	2011 GM_{64}	—	May 8, 2006	Mount Lemmon	Mount Lemmon Survey	·	3.0 km	MPC · JPL
491009	2011 GP_{75}	—	March 26, 2011	Mount Lemmon	Mount Lemmon Survey	·	3.8 km	MPC · JPL
491010	2011 HH_{70}	—	March 29, 2011	Kitt Peak	Spacewatch	·	620 m	MPC · JPL
491011	2011 JO_{25}	—	March 27, 2011	Mount Lemmon	Mount Lemmon Survey	·	2.8 km	MPC · JPL
491012	2011 KH_{12}	—	May 25, 2011	Nogales	M. Schwartz, P. R. Holvorcem	·	1.7 km	MPC · JPL
491013	2011 KZ_{21}	—	May 24, 2011	Haleakala	Pan-STARRS 1	·	1.3 km	MPC · JPL
491014	2011 KC_{46}	—	May 24, 2011	Haleakala	Pan-STARRS 1	·	2.6 km	MPC · JPL
491015	2011 LS_{14}	—	September 23, 2008	Kitt Peak	Spacewatch	·	760 m	MPC · JPL
491016	2011 NK	—	July 1, 2011	Haleakala	Pan-STARRS 1	·	1.2 km	MPC · JPL
491017	2011 OS_{1}	—	July 22, 2011	Haleakala	Pan-STARRS 1	·	860 m	MPC · JPL
491018	2011 OU_{1}	—	July 22, 2011	Haleakala	Pan-STARRS 1	PHO	730 m	MPC · JPL
491019	2011 OB_{6}	—	December 10, 2004	Kitt Peak	Spacewatch	T_{j} (2.99) · 3:2 · (6124)	3.8 km	MPC · JPL
491020	2011 OX_{7}	—	October 1, 2005	Kitt Peak	Spacewatch	·	590 m	MPC · JPL
491021	2011 OF_{12}	—	July 25, 2011	Haleakala	Pan-STARRS 1	·	800 m	MPC · JPL
491022	2011 OO_{16}	—	July 26, 2011	Haleakala	Pan-STARRS 1	·	1.1 km	MPC · JPL
491023	2011 OK_{20}	—	June 3, 2011	Mount Lemmon	Mount Lemmon Survey	·	870 m	MPC · JPL
491024	2011 OD_{24}	—	November 25, 2005	Mount Lemmon	Mount Lemmon Survey	·	510 m	MPC · JPL
491025	2011 PS_{4}	—	July 22, 2011	Haleakala	Pan-STARRS 1	·	2.9 km	MPC · JPL
491026	2011 PC_{7}	—	August 4, 2011	Haleakala	Pan-STARRS 1	·	650 m	MPC · JPL
491027	2011 PZ_{7}	—	October 21, 2008	Kitt Peak	Spacewatch	·	610 m	MPC · JPL
491028	2011 PG_{8}	—	August 6, 2011	Haleakala	Pan-STARRS 1	·	1.1 km	MPC · JPL
491029	2011 PY_{8}	—	August 10, 2011	Haleakala	Pan-STARRS 1	·	1.6 km	MPC · JPL
491030	2011 PA_{15}	—	August 9, 2011	Haleakala	Pan-STARRS 1	T_{j} (2.98) · 3:2	4.6 km	MPC · JPL
491031	2011 QS_{1}	—	August 19, 2011	Haleakala	Pan-STARRS 1	NYS	860 m	MPC · JPL
491032	2011 QH_{2}	—	June 8, 2011	Mount Lemmon	Mount Lemmon Survey	·	680 m	MPC · JPL
491033	2011 QY_{3}	—	August 4, 2011	Haleakala	Pan-STARRS 1	L5	7.7 km	MPC · JPL
491034	2011 QU_{7}	—	July 28, 2011	Haleakala	Pan-STARRS 1	·	900 m	MPC · JPL
491035	2011 QV_{7}	—	July 25, 2011	Haleakala	Pan-STARRS 1	·	2.5 km	MPC · JPL
491036	2011 QK_{10}	—	August 20, 2011	Haleakala	Pan-STARRS 1	·	970 m	MPC · JPL
491037	2011 QW_{11}	—	August 23, 2011	La Sagra	OAM	critical	810 m	MPC · JPL
491038	2011 QK_{14}	—	August 21, 2011	La Sagra	OAM	·	840 m	MPC · JPL
491039	2011 QT_{14}	—	August 23, 2011	Haleakala	Pan-STARRS 1	·	660 m	MPC · JPL
491040	2011 QS_{17}	—	August 20, 2011	Haleakala	Pan-STARRS 1	·	2.1 km	MPC · JPL
491041	2011 QL_{21}	—	August 4, 2011	La Sagra	OAM	·	2.4 km	MPC · JPL
491042	2011 QO_{22}	—	August 24, 2011	Haleakala	Pan-STARRS 1	V	530 m	MPC · JPL
491043	2011 QW_{23}	—	August 10, 2011	Haleakala	Pan-STARRS 1	·	1.8 km	MPC · JPL
491044	2011 QB_{27}	—	August 21, 2011	La Sagra	OAM	·	690 m	MPC · JPL
491045	2011 QL_{34}	—	August 24, 2011	Haleakala	Pan-STARRS 1	T_{j} (2.99) · 3:2	4.7 km	MPC · JPL
491046	2011 QM_{35}	—	January 20, 2009	Mount Lemmon	Mount Lemmon Survey	·	940 m	MPC · JPL
491047	2011 QE_{36}	—	October 28, 2006	Mount Lemmon	Mount Lemmon Survey	THM	2.3 km	MPC · JPL
491048	2011 QF_{42}	—	November 7, 2008	Mount Lemmon	Mount Lemmon Survey	·	680 m	MPC · JPL
491049	2011 QC_{45}	—	October 30, 2008	Kitt Peak	Spacewatch	V	780 m	MPC · JPL
491050	2011 QD_{45}	—	August 28, 2011	Haleakala	Pan-STARRS 1	·	1.1 km	MPC · JPL
491051	2011 QM_{49}	—	August 22, 2011	La Sagra	OAM	·	790 m	MPC · JPL
491052	2011 QJ_{50}	—	August 23, 2011	Haleakala	Pan-STARRS 1	·	1.6 km	MPC · JPL
491053	2011 QP_{58}	—	July 7, 2005	Kitt Peak	Spacewatch	·	2.4 km	MPC · JPL
491054	2011 QE_{60}	—	September 13, 2002	Palomar	NEAT	·	1.4 km	MPC · JPL
491055	2011 QE_{62}	—	August 31, 2011	Haleakala	Pan-STARRS 1	3:2	6.2 km	MPC · JPL
491056	2011 QP_{62}	—	February 13, 2010	Kitt Peak	Spacewatch	V	560 m	MPC · JPL
491057	2011 QA_{65}	—	August 23, 2011	Haleakala	Pan-STARRS 1	·	3.5 km	MPC · JPL
491058	2011 QL_{65}	—	September 27, 2000	Socorro	LINEAR	LIX	3.7 km	MPC · JPL
491059	2011 QF_{66}	—	August 24, 2011	La Sagra	OAM	·	1.1 km	MPC · JPL
491060	2011 QN_{70}	—	July 30, 2011	Siding Spring	SSS	PHO	1.0 km	MPC · JPL
491061	2011 QO_{72}	—	August 24, 2011	Haleakala	Pan-STARRS 1	·	1.7 km	MPC · JPL
491062	2011 QX_{72}	—	August 24, 2000	Socorro	LINEAR	ERI	1.4 km	MPC · JPL
491063	2011 QY_{72}	—	August 31, 2011	La Sagra	OAM	·	1.2 km	MPC · JPL
491064	2011 QU_{75}	—	October 9, 2004	Kitt Peak	Spacewatch	NYS	750 m	MPC · JPL
491065	2011 QW_{83}	—	August 24, 2011	Haleakala	Pan-STARRS 1	·	2.2 km	MPC · JPL
491066	2011 QZ_{84}	—	March 22, 2009	Mount Lemmon	Mount Lemmon Survey	VER	2.6 km	MPC · JPL
491067	2011 QB_{85}	—	August 9, 2011	Haleakala	Pan-STARRS 1	L5	7.5 km	MPC · JPL
491068	2011 QV_{88}	—	March 13, 2007	Kitt Peak	Spacewatch	·	620 m	MPC · JPL
491069	2011 QY_{90}	—	August 30, 2011	Haleakala	Pan-STARRS 1	VER	2.5 km	MPC · JPL
491070	2011 QQ_{91}	—	October 13, 2001	Socorro	LINEAR	·	600 m	MPC · JPL
491071	2011 QL_{95}	—	August 24, 2011	La Sagra	OAM	·	710 m	MPC · JPL
491072	2011 QJ_{97}	—	November 12, 2006	Mount Lemmon	Mount Lemmon Survey	·	2.3 km	MPC · JPL
491073	2011 RG_{7}	—	February 19, 2010	Mount Lemmon	Mount Lemmon Survey	·	590 m	MPC · JPL
491074	2011 RT_{8}	—	August 23, 2011	Haleakala	Pan-STARRS 1	·	1.9 km	MPC · JPL
491075	2011 RZ_{8}	—	August 20, 2011	Haleakala	Pan-STARRS 1	·	1.7 km	MPC · JPL
491076	2011 RQ_{10}	—	October 15, 2004	Anderson Mesa	LONEOS	·	840 m	MPC · JPL
491077	2011 RD_{12}	—	September 4, 2011	Haleakala	Pan-STARRS 1	·	1.0 km	MPC · JPL
491078	2011 RP_{14}	—	September 5, 2011	Haleakala	Pan-STARRS 1	·	1.5 km	MPC · JPL
491079	2011 RP_{15}	—	September 30, 2006	Kitt Peak	Spacewatch	·	2.1 km	MPC · JPL
491080	2011 RR_{17}	—	September 4, 2011	Haleakala	Pan-STARRS 1	MRX	930 m	MPC · JPL
491081	2011 RE_{19}	—	September 5, 2011	Haleakala	Pan-STARRS 1	·	2.0 km	MPC · JPL
491082	2011 SA	—	September 2, 2011	Haleakala	Pan-STARRS 1	·	1.3 km	MPC · JPL
491083	2011 SK_{3}	—	September 17, 2011	La Sagra	OAM	·	1.5 km	MPC · JPL
491084	2011 SF_{6}	—	August 26, 2011	Haleakala	Pan-STARRS 1	·	580 m	MPC · JPL
491085	2011 SP_{7}	—	August 31, 2011	Haleakala	Pan-STARRS 1	·	1.4 km	MPC · JPL
491086	2011 SA_{10}	—	September 26, 1998	Socorro	LINEAR	·	1.3 km	MPC · JPL
491087	2011 SQ_{10}	—	September 4, 2011	Haleakala	Pan-STARRS 1	·	1.5 km	MPC · JPL
491088	2011 SR_{10}	—	September 19, 2011	Mount Lemmon	Mount Lemmon Survey	·	1.3 km	MPC · JPL
491089	2011 SP_{11}	—	September 4, 2011	Haleakala	Pan-STARRS 1	·	1.1 km	MPC · JPL
491090	2011 SL_{12}	—	September 19, 2011	Haleakala	Pan-STARRS 1	·	370 m	MPC · JPL
491091	2011 SR_{13}	—	September 2, 2011	Haleakala	Pan-STARRS 1	·	1.4 km	MPC · JPL
491092	2011 SD_{20}	—	September 20, 2011	Haleakala	Pan-STARRS 1	·	1.5 km	MPC · JPL
491093	2011 SJ_{21}	—	October 21, 2006	Mount Lemmon	Mount Lemmon Survey	THB	2.5 km	MPC · JPL
491094	2011 SN_{23}	—	June 13, 2011	Mount Lemmon	Mount Lemmon Survey	·	2.2 km	MPC · JPL
491095	2011 SX_{23}	—	September 20, 2011	La Sagra	OAM	·	2.6 km	MPC · JPL
491096	2011 ST_{24}	—	October 13, 2004	Kitt Peak	Spacewatch	·	880 m	MPC · JPL
491097	2011 ST_{25}	—	September 19, 2011	Haleakala	Pan-STARRS 1	EOS	2.2 km	MPC · JPL
491098	2011 SH_{27}	—	August 25, 2011	La Sagra	OAM	·	1.0 km	MPC · JPL
491099	2011 SR_{27}	—	September 18, 2011	La Sagra	OAM	·	2.6 km	MPC · JPL
491100	2011 SN_{33}	—	January 31, 2006	Kitt Peak	Spacewatch	V	710 m	MPC · JPL

== 491101–491200 ==
back to top

Designation			Discovery			Properties		Ref
Permanent	Provisional	Named after	Date	Site	Discoverer(s)	Category	Diam.	Ref
491101	2011 SN_{37}	—	March 24, 2003	Kitt Peak	Spacewatch	·	890 m	MPC · JPL
491102	2011 SX_{41}	—	October 11, 2007	Kitt Peak	Spacewatch	·	820 m	MPC · JPL
491103	2011 SQ_{42}	—	August 1, 2000	Cerro Tololo	Deep Ecliptic Survey	·	1.6 km	MPC · JPL
491104	2011 SS_{43}	—	June 27, 2011	Mount Lemmon	Mount Lemmon Survey	·	970 m	MPC · JPL
491105	2011 SB_{46}	—	September 2, 2011	Haleakala	Pan-STARRS 1	·	800 m	MPC · JPL
491106	2011 SL_{49}	—	October 27, 2008	Kitt Peak	Spacewatch	·	520 m	MPC · JPL
491107	2011 SC_{55}	—	September 20, 2011	Catalina	CSS	·	1.0 km	MPC · JPL
491108	2011 SN_{61}	—	September 20, 2011	Haleakala	Pan-STARRS 1	·	1.0 km	MPC · JPL
491109	2011 SR_{65}	—	November 24, 1997	Kitt Peak	Spacewatch	·	960 m	MPC · JPL
491110	2011 SV_{66}	—	November 14, 2007	Kitt Peak	Spacewatch	JUN	770 m	MPC · JPL
491111	2011 SM_{75}	—	October 27, 2008	Mount Lemmon	Mount Lemmon Survey	·	530 m	MPC · JPL
491112	2011 SW_{76}	—	October 24, 1995	Kitt Peak	Spacewatch	·	1.2 km	MPC · JPL
491113	2011 SD_{84}	—	October 21, 2007	Catalina	CSS	EUN	840 m	MPC · JPL
491114	2011 SR_{84}	—	September 21, 2011	Kitt Peak	Spacewatch	·	1.2 km	MPC · JPL
491115	2011 SU_{86}	—	October 22, 2006	Mount Lemmon	Mount Lemmon Survey	·	3.7 km	MPC · JPL
491116	2011 SF_{98}	—	September 4, 2011	Haleakala	Pan-STARRS 1	·	2.1 km	MPC · JPL
491117	2011 SZ_{98}	—	November 24, 2006	Kitt Peak	Spacewatch	THM	1.7 km	MPC · JPL
491118	2011 SK_{100}	—	August 24, 2011	Haleakala	Pan-STARRS 1	·	1.9 km	MPC · JPL
491119	2011 SW_{102}	—	August 27, 2011	Haleakala	Pan-STARRS 1	·	2.2 km	MPC · JPL
491120	2011 SR_{104}	—	February 9, 2008	Kitt Peak	Spacewatch	EOS	1.5 km	MPC · JPL
491121	2011 SD_{107}	—	September 15, 2007	Mount Lemmon	Mount Lemmon Survey	(5)	920 m	MPC · JPL
491122	2011 SR_{107}	—	June 9, 2011	Haleakala	Pan-STARRS 1	·	1.4 km	MPC · JPL
491123	2011 SA_{110}	—	August 25, 2011	La Sagra	OAM	·	1.4 km	MPC · JPL
491124	2011 SE_{110}	—	September 18, 2011	Mount Lemmon	Mount Lemmon Survey	EUN	880 m	MPC · JPL
491125	2011 SP_{113}	—	August 26, 2011	Kitt Peak	Spacewatch	·	1.1 km	MPC · JPL
491126	2011 SB_{118}	—	July 1, 2011	Haleakala	Pan-STARRS 1	·	1.1 km	MPC · JPL
491127	2011 SP_{124}	—	November 2, 2007	Kitt Peak	Spacewatch	·	970 m	MPC · JPL
491128	2011 SN_{125}	—	March 2, 2008	Mount Lemmon	Mount Lemmon Survey	·	1.6 km	MPC · JPL
491129	2011 SF_{129}	—	September 23, 2011	Haleakala	Pan-STARRS 1	·	1.7 km	MPC · JPL
491130	2011 SE_{132}	—	September 23, 2011	Kitt Peak	Spacewatch	·	710 m	MPC · JPL
491131	2011 SN_{135}	—	September 28, 2006	Mount Lemmon	Mount Lemmon Survey	·	1.5 km	MPC · JPL
491132	2011 SX_{135}	—	November 5, 2007	Kitt Peak	Spacewatch	·	1.0 km	MPC · JPL
491133	2011 SL_{140}	—	September 20, 2011	Kitt Peak	Spacewatch	NEM	1.9 km	MPC · JPL
491134	2011 SU_{140}	—	September 21, 2011	Kitt Peak	Spacewatch	·	1.8 km	MPC · JPL
491135	2011 SD_{151}	—	September 27, 2003	Kitt Peak	Spacewatch	3:2 · SHU	4.6 km	MPC · JPL
491136	2011 SS_{151}	—	September 26, 2011	Haleakala	Pan-STARRS 1	·	1.5 km	MPC · JPL
491137	2011 SE_{155}	—	October 2, 2006	Mount Lemmon	Mount Lemmon Survey	·	1.4 km	MPC · JPL
491138	2011 SN_{156}	—	September 26, 2011	Haleakala	Pan-STARRS 1	·	1.2 km	MPC · JPL
491139	2011 SA_{165}	—	September 23, 2011	Haleakala	Pan-STARRS 1	THM	1.8 km	MPC · JPL
491140	2011 SC_{166}	—	September 18, 2011	Mount Lemmon	Mount Lemmon Survey	·	2.6 km	MPC · JPL
491141	2011 SO_{167}	—	September 4, 2011	Haleakala	Pan-STARRS 1	·	1.0 km	MPC · JPL
491142	2011 SM_{168}	—	June 23, 2007	Kitt Peak	Spacewatch	·	860 m	MPC · JPL
491143	2011 SA_{177}	—	October 20, 2007	Mount Lemmon	Mount Lemmon Survey	·	890 m	MPC · JPL
491144	2011 SD_{179}	—	September 26, 2011	Kitt Peak	Spacewatch	·	650 m	MPC · JPL
491145	2011 SV_{179}	—	November 11, 2007	Mount Lemmon	Mount Lemmon Survey	·	970 m	MPC · JPL
491146	2011 SM_{181}	—	September 10, 2004	Socorro	LINEAR	·	620 m	MPC · JPL
491147	2011 SV_{183}	—	October 27, 2006	Mount Lemmon	Mount Lemmon Survey	·	1.9 km	MPC · JPL
491148	2011 SV_{184}	—	January 1, 2009	Mount Lemmon	Mount Lemmon Survey	NYS	1.1 km	MPC · JPL
491149	2011 SY_{186}	—	September 29, 2011	Mount Lemmon	Mount Lemmon Survey	PHO	990 m	MPC · JPL
491150	2011 SF_{192}	—	September 25, 2011	Haleakala	Pan-STARRS 1	·	1.1 km	MPC · JPL
491151	2011 SO_{194}	—	September 8, 2011	Kitt Peak	Spacewatch	·	1.2 km	MPC · JPL
491152	2011 SQ_{195}	—	September 2, 2011	Haleakala	Pan-STARRS 1	·	880 m	MPC · JPL
491153	2011 SS_{204}	—	October 4, 2006	Mount Lemmon	Mount Lemmon Survey	·	1.8 km	MPC · JPL
491154	2011 SR_{206}	—	August 30, 2011	Haleakala	Pan-STARRS 1	·	1.4 km	MPC · JPL
491155	2011 SL_{210}	—	August 23, 2011	Haleakala	Pan-STARRS 1	·	900 m	MPC · JPL
491156	2011 SP_{214}	—	November 11, 2004	Anderson Mesa	LONEOS	PHO	1.3 km	MPC · JPL
491157	2011 SE_{216}	—	May 8, 2010	WISE	WISE	L5	9.2 km	MPC · JPL
491158	2011 SX_{217}	—	November 16, 2006	Mount Lemmon	Mount Lemmon Survey	·	2.0 km	MPC · JPL
491159	2011 SH_{219}	—	October 4, 2007	Mount Lemmon	Mount Lemmon Survey	·	1.1 km	MPC · JPL
491160	2011 SM_{219}	—	August 10, 2007	Kitt Peak	Spacewatch	·	720 m	MPC · JPL
491161	2011 ST_{221}	—	April 18, 2007	Kitt Peak	Spacewatch	·	700 m	MPC · JPL
491162	2011 SJ_{230}	—	October 7, 2004	Kitt Peak	Spacewatch	·	1.1 km	MPC · JPL
491163	2011 SR_{234}	—	September 26, 2011	Haleakala	Pan-STARRS 1	AGN	1.2 km	MPC · JPL
491164	2011 SN_{253}	—	September 21, 2011	Catalina	CSS	·	1.0 km	MPC · JPL
491165	2011 SZ_{256}	—	May 20, 2005	Mount Lemmon	Mount Lemmon Survey	·	2.1 km	MPC · JPL
491166	2011 SF_{261}	—	October 24, 1995	Kitt Peak	Spacewatch	·	1.6 km	MPC · JPL
491167	2011 TF_{5}	—	October 4, 2011	Piszkéstető	K. Sárneczky	·	3.4 km	MPC · JPL
491168	2011 TJ_{13}	—	October 6, 2011	La Sagra	OAM	·	1.3 km	MPC · JPL
491169	2011 TF_{14}	—	August 25, 2004	Kitt Peak	Spacewatch	·	690 m	MPC · JPL
491170	2011 UW	—	October 7, 2011	La Sagra	OAM	·	3.6 km	MPC · JPL
491171	2011 UG_{1}	—	October 2, 2000	Socorro	LINEAR	V	700 m	MPC · JPL
491172	2011 UN_{8}	—	November 9, 2007	Kitt Peak	Spacewatch	·	1.0 km	MPC · JPL
491173	2011 UE_{14}	—	March 1, 2008	Mount Lemmon	Mount Lemmon Survey	·	1.9 km	MPC · JPL
491174	2011 UT_{21}	—	January 1, 2008	Mount Lemmon	Mount Lemmon Survey	·	1.2 km	MPC · JPL
491175	2011 UQ_{24}	—	February 22, 2009	Catalina	CSS	PHO	970 m	MPC · JPL
491176	2011 UG_{25}	—	October 1, 2011	Kitt Peak	Spacewatch	·	1.6 km	MPC · JPL
491177	2011 UH_{28}	—	October 17, 2011	Kitt Peak	Spacewatch	·	1.2 km	MPC · JPL
491178	2011 UT_{46}	—	August 21, 2006	Kitt Peak	Spacewatch	·	1.7 km	MPC · JPL
491179	2011 UE_{47}	—	October 1, 2011	Kitt Peak	Spacewatch	·	3.6 km	MPC · JPL
491180	2011 UL_{50}	—	October 18, 2011	Kitt Peak	Spacewatch	·	1.0 km	MPC · JPL
491181	2011 UA_{51}	—	November 27, 2000	Kitt Peak	Spacewatch	NYS	1.1 km	MPC · JPL
491182	2011 UC_{53}	—	September 3, 2007	Catalina	CSS	·	1.2 km	MPC · JPL
491183	2011 UV_{54}	—	October 18, 2011	Mount Lemmon	Mount Lemmon Survey	·	910 m	MPC · JPL
491184	2011 UY_{56}	—	September 8, 2011	La Sagra	OAM	T_{j} (2.98)	3.7 km	MPC · JPL
491185	2011 UY_{58}	—	December 16, 2006	Kitt Peak	Spacewatch	THM	2.0 km	MPC · JPL
491186	2011 UD_{59}	—	March 18, 2010	Kitt Peak	Spacewatch	·	930 m	MPC · JPL
491187	2011 UX_{59}	—	September 23, 2000	Socorro	LINEAR	·	2.5 km	MPC · JPL
491188	2011 UM_{61}	—	October 21, 2011	Mount Lemmon	Mount Lemmon Survey	·	1.8 km	MPC · JPL
491189	2011 UV_{76}	—	October 7, 2007	Kitt Peak	Spacewatch	·	890 m	MPC · JPL
491190	2011 UF_{84}	—	September 27, 2000	Socorro	LINEAR	·	2.1 km	MPC · JPL
491191	2011 UY_{84}	—	October 19, 2011	Kitt Peak	Spacewatch	·	1.4 km	MPC · JPL
491192	2011 US_{86}	—	October 20, 2011	Mount Lemmon	Mount Lemmon Survey	·	1.2 km	MPC · JPL
491193	2011 UL_{88}	—	October 21, 2011	Mount Lemmon	Mount Lemmon Survey	EUN	960 m	MPC · JPL
491194	2011 UG_{89}	—	October 21, 2011	Mount Lemmon	Mount Lemmon Survey	·	1.4 km	MPC · JPL
491195	2011 UE_{94}	—	September 24, 2011	Mount Lemmon	Mount Lemmon Survey	·	1.5 km	MPC · JPL
491196	2011 UZ_{97}	—	October 19, 2011	Kitt Peak	Spacewatch	·	1.3 km	MPC · JPL
491197	2011 UQ_{101}	—	October 19, 2011	Catalina	CSS	·	1.4 km	MPC · JPL
491198	2011 UJ_{102}	—	October 10, 2004	Kitt Peak	Spacewatch	·	710 m	MPC · JPL
491199	2011 UX_{107}	—	September 16, 2004	Socorro	LINEAR	PHO	810 m	MPC · JPL
491200	2011 UL_{111}	—	July 1, 2011	Haleakala	Pan-STARRS 1	·	3.2 km	MPC · JPL

== 491201–491300 ==
back to top

Designation			Discovery			Properties		Ref
Permanent	Provisional	Named after	Date	Site	Discoverer(s)	Category	Diam.	Ref
491201	2011 UH_{117}	—	October 15, 2004	Mount Lemmon	Mount Lemmon Survey	·	950 m	MPC · JPL
491202	2011 UQ_{117}	—	December 12, 2004	Kitt Peak	Spacewatch	·	1.2 km	MPC · JPL
491203	2011 UQ_{118}	—	October 18, 2011	Mount Lemmon	Mount Lemmon Survey	·	2.3 km	MPC · JPL
491204	2011 UN_{120}	—	August 13, 2007	XuYi	PMO NEO Survey Program	·	1.4 km	MPC · JPL
491205	2011 UP_{122}	—	October 27, 2006	Mount Lemmon	Mount Lemmon Survey	·	1.6 km	MPC · JPL
491206	2011 UR_{123}	—	October 19, 2011	Mount Lemmon	Mount Lemmon Survey	THM	1.7 km	MPC · JPL
491207	2011 UC_{128}	—	September 25, 2011	Haleakala	Pan-STARRS 1	·	1.2 km	MPC · JPL
491208	2011 UU_{129}	—	November 7, 2007	Kitt Peak	Spacewatch	·	900 m	MPC · JPL
491209	2011 UF_{131}	—	October 19, 2011	Kitt Peak	Spacewatch	·	1.5 km	MPC · JPL
491210	2011 UB_{139}	—	September 24, 2011	Mount Lemmon	Mount Lemmon Survey	(5)	940 m	MPC · JPL
491211	2011 UB_{141}	—	September 24, 2011	Haleakala	Pan-STARRS 1	LIX	3.6 km	MPC · JPL
491212	2011 UZ_{142}	—	October 23, 2011	Kitt Peak	Spacewatch	(5)	1.3 km	MPC · JPL
491213	2011 US_{144}	—	October 18, 2007	Kitt Peak	Spacewatch	·	1.1 km	MPC · JPL
491214	2011 UH_{150}	—	September 28, 2006	Kitt Peak	Spacewatch	·	1.3 km	MPC · JPL
491215	2011 UA_{152}	—	October 24, 2011	Haleakala	Pan-STARRS 1	·	840 m	MPC · JPL
491216	2011 UP_{156}	—	September 27, 2011	Mount Lemmon	Mount Lemmon Survey	·	1.1 km	MPC · JPL
491217	2011 UY_{167}	—	October 23, 2011	Haleakala	Pan-STARRS 1	·	3.0 km	MPC · JPL
491218	2011 UQ_{173}	—	September 21, 2011	Kitt Peak	Spacewatch	·	1.2 km	MPC · JPL
491219	2011 UP_{179}	—	October 24, 2011	Kitt Peak	Spacewatch	·	1.3 km	MPC · JPL
491220	2011 UO_{180}	—	October 24, 2011	Haleakala	Pan-STARRS 1	·	1.1 km	MPC · JPL
491221	2011 UY_{181}	—	October 7, 2007	Anderson Mesa	LONEOS	·	1.3 km	MPC · JPL
491222	2011 UE_{182}	—	October 20, 2011	Mount Lemmon	Mount Lemmon Survey	·	2.1 km	MPC · JPL
491223	2011 UA_{183}	—	October 25, 2011	Haleakala	Pan-STARRS 1	·	3.7 km	MPC · JPL
491224	2011 UO_{183}	—	October 25, 2011	Haleakala	Pan-STARRS 1	EOS	2.2 km	MPC · JPL
491225	2011 UT_{184}	—	October 25, 2011	Haleakala	Pan-STARRS 1	·	2.2 km	MPC · JPL
491226	2011 UZ_{184}	—	October 25, 2011	Haleakala	Pan-STARRS 1	·	1.2 km	MPC · JPL
491227	2011 UZ_{185}	—	October 25, 2011	Haleakala	Pan-STARRS 1	V	740 m	MPC · JPL
491228	2011 UQ_{186}	—	October 25, 2011	Haleakala	Pan-STARRS 1	·	2.3 km	MPC · JPL
491229	2011 UB_{187}	—	November 13, 2007	Mount Lemmon	Mount Lemmon Survey	·	930 m	MPC · JPL
491230	2011 UE_{187}	—	October 25, 2011	Haleakala	Pan-STARRS 1	·	1.3 km	MPC · JPL
491231	2011 UX_{187}	—	September 24, 2011	Haleakala	Pan-STARRS 1	·	2.3 km	MPC · JPL
491232	2011 UV_{189}	—	September 12, 2007	Catalina	CSS	·	1.1 km	MPC · JPL
491233	2011 UZ_{191}	—	October 20, 2011	Kitt Peak	Spacewatch	·	1.0 km	MPC · JPL
491234	2011 UW_{192}	—	October 26, 2011	Haleakala	Pan-STARRS 1	·	750 m	MPC · JPL
491235	2011 UP_{198}	—	October 7, 2007	Catalina	CSS	·	1.6 km	MPC · JPL
491236	2011 UV_{199}	—	October 25, 2011	Haleakala	Pan-STARRS 1	·	1.4 km	MPC · JPL
491237	2011 UP_{200}	—	October 25, 2011	Kitt Peak	Spacewatch	·	3.5 km	MPC · JPL
491238	2011 UH_{201}	—	April 24, 2007	Kitt Peak	Spacewatch	·	730 m	MPC · JPL
491239	2011 UO_{201}	—	September 18, 2004	Siding Spring	SSS	PHO	960 m	MPC · JPL
491240	2011 UU_{204}	—	June 11, 2011	Haleakala	Pan-STARRS 1	·	810 m	MPC · JPL
491241	2011 UB_{206}	—	October 19, 2011	Kitt Peak	Spacewatch	·	1.5 km	MPC · JPL
491242	2011 UG_{206}	—	September 23, 2011	Haleakala	Pan-STARRS 1	·	1.4 km	MPC · JPL
491243	2011 UB_{209}	—	September 26, 2011	Kitt Peak	Spacewatch	·	1.5 km	MPC · JPL
491244	2011 UG_{211}	—	October 4, 2004	Kitt Peak	Spacewatch	·	580 m	MPC · JPL
491245	2011 UC_{213}	—	January 8, 2002	Socorro	LINEAR	·	2.7 km	MPC · JPL
491246	2011 US_{220}	—	October 30, 2007	Kitt Peak	Spacewatch	(5)	860 m	MPC · JPL
491247	2011 UV_{228}	—	September 23, 2011	Haleakala	Pan-STARRS 1	NYS	1.1 km	MPC · JPL
491248	2011 UJ_{234}	—	September 27, 2006	Kitt Peak	Spacewatch	HOF	2.1 km	MPC · JPL
491249	2011 UC_{237}	—	August 22, 2007	Anderson Mesa	LONEOS	MAS	690 m	MPC · JPL
491250	2011 UJ_{241}	—	April 24, 2010	WISE	WISE	·	1.5 km	MPC · JPL
491251	2011 UJ_{243}	—	October 22, 2011	Kitt Peak	Spacewatch	·	1.1 km	MPC · JPL
491252	2011 US_{245}	—	October 18, 2011	Kitt Peak	Spacewatch	·	2.4 km	MPC · JPL
491253	2011 UT_{245}	—	September 24, 2000	Socorro	LINEAR	·	1.5 km	MPC · JPL
491254	2011 UZ_{247}	—	September 24, 2011	Mount Lemmon	Mount Lemmon Survey	·	620 m	MPC · JPL
491255	2011 UU_{248}	—	October 26, 2011	Haleakala	Pan-STARRS 1	·	830 m	MPC · JPL
491256	2011 UF_{249}	—	October 26, 2011	Haleakala	Pan-STARRS 1	·	1.3 km	MPC · JPL
491257	2011 US_{250}	—	October 26, 2011	Haleakala	Pan-STARRS 1	·	1.1 km	MPC · JPL
491258	2011 UW_{251}	—	September 17, 2010	Mount Lemmon	Mount Lemmon Survey	3:2	4.4 km	MPC · JPL
491259	2011 US_{265}	—	October 26, 2011	Haleakala	Pan-STARRS 1	·	960 m	MPC · JPL
491260	2011 UN_{269}	—	September 29, 2011	Kitt Peak	Spacewatch	·	1.2 km	MPC · JPL
491261	2011 UK_{277}	—	November 16, 2007	Mount Lemmon	Mount Lemmon Survey	·	1.5 km	MPC · JPL
491262	2011 UW_{279}	—	August 27, 2006	Kitt Peak	Spacewatch	·	1.6 km	MPC · JPL
491263	2011 US_{282}	—	November 5, 2007	Kitt Peak	Spacewatch	RAF	600 m	MPC · JPL
491264	2011 UW_{283}	—	October 24, 2011	Haleakala	Pan-STARRS 1	·	2.7 km	MPC · JPL
491265	2011 UD_{299}	—	October 21, 2011	Kitt Peak	Spacewatch	V	730 m	MPC · JPL
491266	2011 UM_{307}	—	November 2, 2007	Kitt Peak	Spacewatch	·	1.2 km	MPC · JPL
491267	2011 UR_{308}	—	December 14, 1998	Kitt Peak	Spacewatch	·	1.4 km	MPC · JPL
491268	2011 UF_{310}	—	September 12, 2007	Mount Lemmon	Mount Lemmon Survey	NYS	980 m	MPC · JPL
491269	2011 UP_{315}	—	October 30, 2011	Kitt Peak	Spacewatch	·	790 m	MPC · JPL
491270	2011 UD_{317}	—	October 25, 2011	Haleakala	Pan-STARRS 1	·	2.2 km	MPC · JPL
491271	2011 UL_{320}	—	October 30, 2011	Kitt Peak	Spacewatch	·	830 m	MPC · JPL
491272	2011 UK_{331}	—	October 24, 2011	Haleakala	Pan-STARRS 1	·	3.5 km	MPC · JPL
491273	2011 UQ_{331}	—	February 22, 2009	Mount Lemmon	Mount Lemmon Survey	·	1.3 km	MPC · JPL
491274	2011 UU_{335}	—	July 1, 2011	Haleakala	Pan-STARRS 1	(2076)	990 m	MPC · JPL
491275	2011 UV_{335}	—	September 21, 2011	Catalina	CSS	·	1.7 km	MPC · JPL
491276	2011 UZ_{362}	—	January 16, 2005	Kitt Peak	Spacewatch	·	990 m	MPC · JPL
491277	2011 UW_{374}	—	November 20, 2006	Mount Lemmon	Mount Lemmon Survey	·	1.4 km	MPC · JPL
491278	2011 UZ_{383}	—	October 24, 2011	Haleakala	Pan-STARRS 1	·	2.4 km	MPC · JPL
491279	2011 UU_{385}	—	October 25, 2011	Haleakala	Pan-STARRS 1	·	1.6 km	MPC · JPL
491280	2011 UD_{398}	—	September 24, 2011	Mount Lemmon	Mount Lemmon Survey	(5)	1.1 km	MPC · JPL
491281	2011 UG_{400}	—	September 25, 2011	Haleakala	Pan-STARRS 1	V	540 m	MPC · JPL
491282	2011 UO_{402}	—	February 1, 2011	Haleakala	Pan-STARRS 1	L4	8.8 km	MPC · JPL
491283	2011 UZ_{406}	—	September 26, 2011	Catalina	CSS	·	2.1 km	MPC · JPL
491284	2011 VD_{5}	—	September 30, 2011	Kitt Peak	Spacewatch	EOS	1.6 km	MPC · JPL
491285	2011 VY_{5}	—	September 25, 2011	Haleakala	Pan-STARRS 1	·	830 m	MPC · JPL
491286	2011 VS_{6}	—	October 25, 2011	Haleakala	Pan-STARRS 1	·	740 m	MPC · JPL
491287	2011 VH_{9}	—	September 18, 2011	Catalina	CSS	·	1.6 km	MPC · JPL
491288	2011 VS_{14}	—	September 23, 2011	Haleakala	Pan-STARRS 1	JUN	850 m	MPC · JPL
491289	2011 VF_{18}	—	September 4, 2011	Haleakala	Pan-STARRS 1	V	710 m	MPC · JPL
491290	2011 VG_{18}	—	April 10, 2010	Kitt Peak	Spacewatch	V	720 m	MPC · JPL
491291	2011 VT_{18}	—	October 25, 2011	Haleakala	Pan-STARRS 1	·	3.4 km	MPC · JPL
491292	2011 VU_{18}	—	October 25, 2011	Haleakala	Pan-STARRS 1	·	2.3 km	MPC · JPL
491293	2011 VX_{18}	—	October 17, 2011	Kitt Peak	Spacewatch	·	1.4 km	MPC · JPL
491294	2011 VQ_{21}	—	December 1, 2006	Mount Lemmon	Mount Lemmon Survey	·	2.0 km	MPC · JPL
491295	2011 WA_{2}	—	November 16, 2011	Mount Lemmon	Mount Lemmon Survey	·	1.8 km	MPC · JPL
491296	2011 WM_{3}	—	March 30, 2004	Socorro	LINEAR	·	2.2 km	MPC · JPL
491297	2011 WF_{10}	—	December 4, 2007	Mount Lemmon	Mount Lemmon Survey	·	960 m	MPC · JPL
491298	2011 WV_{13}	—	September 9, 2007	Mount Lemmon	Mount Lemmon Survey	MAS	700 m	MPC · JPL
491299	2011 WP_{14}	—	October 26, 2011	Haleakala	Pan-STARRS 1	EOS	2.5 km	MPC · JPL
491300	2011 WW_{19}	—	September 27, 2011	Mount Lemmon	Mount Lemmon Survey	·	1.5 km	MPC · JPL

== 491301–491400 ==
back to top

Designation			Discovery			Properties		Ref
Permanent	Provisional	Named after	Date	Site	Discoverer(s)	Category	Diam.	Ref
491301	2011 WT_{20}	—	April 26, 2010	WISE	WISE	·	2.5 km	MPC · JPL
491302	2011 WZ_{20}	—	October 26, 2011	Haleakala	Pan-STARRS 1	·	960 m	MPC · JPL
491303	2011 WV_{22}	—	October 26, 2011	Haleakala	Pan-STARRS 1	·	850 m	MPC · JPL
491304	2011 WO_{24}	—	November 23, 2011	Mount Lemmon	Mount Lemmon Survey	·	1.4 km	MPC · JPL
491305	2011 WR_{25}	—	October 11, 2004	Kitt Peak	Spacewatch	·	550 m	MPC · JPL
491306	2011 WK_{38}	—	May 24, 2010	WISE	WISE	·	2.9 km	MPC · JPL
491307	2011 WR_{38}	—	October 25, 2011	Haleakala	Pan-STARRS 1	·	1.5 km	MPC · JPL
491308	2011 WH_{49}	—	October 26, 2011	Haleakala	Pan-STARRS 1	(5)	1.1 km	MPC · JPL
491309	2011 WS_{50}	—	October 23, 2011	Kitt Peak	Spacewatch	·	2.8 km	MPC · JPL
491310	2011 WJ_{51}	—	October 26, 2011	Haleakala	Pan-STARRS 1	·	2.9 km	MPC · JPL
491311	2011 WM_{51}	—	September 2, 2010	Mount Lemmon	Mount Lemmon Survey	·	2.3 km	MPC · JPL
491312	2011 WW_{56}	—	October 26, 2011	Haleakala	Pan-STARRS 1	·	1.2 km	MPC · JPL
491313	2011 WQ_{57}	—	October 26, 2011	Haleakala	Pan-STARRS 1	·	2.4 km	MPC · JPL
491314	2011 WO_{60}	—	October 26, 2011	Haleakala	Pan-STARRS 1	·	1.1 km	MPC · JPL
491315	2011 WA_{68}	—	October 25, 2011	Haleakala	Pan-STARRS 1	·	2.6 km	MPC · JPL
491316	2011 WT_{68}	—	November 17, 2011	Kitt Peak	Spacewatch	·	1.3 km	MPC · JPL
491317	2011 WD_{70}	—	September 7, 2011	Kitt Peak	Spacewatch	·	1.7 km	MPC · JPL
491318	2011 WL_{71}	—	October 26, 2011	Haleakala	Pan-STARRS 1	·	3.4 km	MPC · JPL
491319	2011 WA_{79}	—	October 24, 2007	Mount Lemmon	Mount Lemmon Survey	·	1.1 km	MPC · JPL
491320	2011 WL_{79}	—	October 25, 2011	Haleakala	Pan-STARRS 1	HYG	2.8 km	MPC · JPL
491321	2011 WX_{86}	—	October 26, 2011	Haleakala	Pan-STARRS 1	·	1.6 km	MPC · JPL
491322	2011 WS_{87}	—	October 25, 2011	Haleakala	Pan-STARRS 1	MAR	990 m	MPC · JPL
491323	2011 WV_{87}	—	October 26, 2011	Haleakala	Pan-STARRS 1	·	760 m	MPC · JPL
491324	2011 WB_{97}	—	October 22, 2011	Kitt Peak	Spacewatch	·	1.4 km	MPC · JPL
491325	2011 WJ_{106}	—	November 3, 2011	Mount Lemmon	Mount Lemmon Survey	·	2.6 km	MPC · JPL
491326	2011 WL_{107}	—	November 30, 2011	Kitt Peak	Spacewatch	·	1.8 km	MPC · JPL
491327	2011 WY_{109}	—	December 4, 2007	Mount Lemmon	Mount Lemmon Survey	·	1.1 km	MPC · JPL
491328	2011 WW_{113}	—	February 9, 2008	Mount Lemmon	Mount Lemmon Survey	·	1.2 km	MPC · JPL
491329	2011 WX_{116}	—	December 18, 2007	Mount Lemmon	Mount Lemmon Survey	·	1.1 km	MPC · JPL
491330	2011 WR_{124}	—	December 4, 2007	Kitt Peak	Spacewatch	·	1.0 km	MPC · JPL
491331	2011 WK_{134}	—	November 23, 2011	Catalina	CSS	·	1.3 km	MPC · JPL
491332	2011 WU_{134}	—	October 3, 2010	Catalina	CSS	L4	20 km	MPC · JPL
491333	2011 WP_{143}	—	October 25, 2011	Haleakala	Pan-STARRS 1	·	3.4 km	MPC · JPL
491334	2011 WY_{151}	—	November 20, 2011	Haleakala	Pan-STARRS 1	·	2.6 km	MPC · JPL
491335	2011 WY_{152}	—	October 23, 2011	Haleakala	Pan-STARRS 1	·	820 m	MPC · JPL
491336	2011 XH	—	October 26, 2011	Haleakala	Pan-STARRS 1	KON	2.0 km	MPC · JPL
491337	2011 XO_{2}	—	October 26, 2011	Haleakala	Pan-STARRS 1	KON	1.8 km	MPC · JPL
491338	2011 YM_{7}	—	November 24, 2011	Mount Lemmon	Mount Lemmon Survey	·	2.2 km	MPC · JPL
491339	2011 YR_{19}	—	December 27, 2011	Mount Lemmon	Mount Lemmon Survey	·	1.8 km	MPC · JPL
491340	2011 YB_{21}	—	December 27, 2011	Mount Lemmon	Mount Lemmon Survey	·	2.2 km	MPC · JPL
491341	2011 YD_{24}	—	December 25, 2011	Kitt Peak	Spacewatch	EUN	1.1 km	MPC · JPL
491342	2011 YT_{24}	—	October 3, 2006	Mount Lemmon	Mount Lemmon Survey	·	1.3 km	MPC · JPL
491343	2011 YU_{24}	—	February 27, 2008	Kitt Peak	Spacewatch	·	1.1 km	MPC · JPL
491344	2011 YY_{29}	—	December 25, 2011	Kitt Peak	Spacewatch	·	1.3 km	MPC · JPL
491345	2011 YY_{30}	—	December 25, 2011	Kitt Peak	Spacewatch	·	2.7 km	MPC · JPL
491346	2011 YL_{31}	—	November 1, 2011	Mount Lemmon	Mount Lemmon Survey	·	1.4 km	MPC · JPL
491347	2011 YW_{37}	—	October 28, 2006	Catalina	CSS	·	1.7 km	MPC · JPL
491348	2011 YZ_{50}	—	December 30, 2011	Mount Lemmon	Mount Lemmon Survey	EUN	960 m	MPC · JPL
491349	2011 YG_{51}	—	February 28, 2008	Mount Lemmon	Mount Lemmon Survey	DOR	2.0 km	MPC · JPL
491350	2011 YN_{52}	—	December 26, 2011	Kitt Peak	Spacewatch	·	1.9 km	MPC · JPL
491351	2011 YR_{56}	—	December 30, 2007	Kitt Peak	Spacewatch	(5)	1.2 km	MPC · JPL
491352	2011 YU_{68}	—	December 18, 2007	Mount Lemmon	Mount Lemmon Survey	·	1.2 km	MPC · JPL
491353	2011 YJ_{70}	—	November 19, 2006	Kitt Peak	Spacewatch	·	1.3 km	MPC · JPL
491354	2012 AW_{3}	—	January 1, 2012	Mount Lemmon	Mount Lemmon Survey	·	1.6 km	MPC · JPL
491355	2012 AG_{6}	—	November 19, 2007	Mount Lemmon	Mount Lemmon Survey	·	2.2 km	MPC · JPL
491356	2012 AK_{7}	—	November 24, 2011	Haleakala	Pan-STARRS 1	·	1.3 km	MPC · JPL
491357	2012 AW_{14}	—	December 24, 2011	Catalina	CSS	·	2.1 km	MPC · JPL
491358	2012 BU	—	September 15, 2009	Kitt Peak	Spacewatch	L4	5.7 km	MPC · JPL
491359	2012 BM_{2}	—	November 14, 2006	Mount Lemmon	Mount Lemmon Survey	·	1.3 km	MPC · JPL
491360	2012 BH_{12}	—	February 10, 2008	Kitt Peak	Spacewatch	·	1.2 km	MPC · JPL
491361	2012 BY_{12}	—	December 11, 2006	Kitt Peak	Spacewatch	GEF	1.1 km	MPC · JPL
491362	2012 BD_{17}	—	January 19, 2012	Kitt Peak	Spacewatch	·	1.6 km	MPC · JPL
491363	2012 BT_{26}	—	January 1, 2012	Mount Lemmon	Mount Lemmon Survey	ADE	1.6 km	MPC · JPL
491364	2012 BD_{33}	—	January 4, 2012	Kitt Peak	Spacewatch	·	1.8 km	MPC · JPL
491365	2012 BN_{41}	—	March 7, 2008	Kitt Peak	Spacewatch	MIS	2.0 km	MPC · JPL
491366	2012 BF_{44}	—	November 5, 2007	Kitt Peak	Spacewatch	·	750 m	MPC · JPL
491367	2012 BD_{56}	—	January 24, 2007	Mount Lemmon	Mount Lemmon Survey	DOR	2.3 km	MPC · JPL
491368	2012 BY_{58}	—	January 18, 2012	Mount Lemmon	Mount Lemmon Survey	·	1.5 km	MPC · JPL
491369	2012 BG_{69}	—	September 9, 2010	La Sagra	OAM	·	1.5 km	MPC · JPL
491370	2012 BT_{71}	—	November 28, 2011	Mount Lemmon	Mount Lemmon Survey	·	1.9 km	MPC · JPL
491371	2012 BZ_{71}	—	January 21, 2012	Kitt Peak	Spacewatch	·	2.1 km	MPC · JPL
491372	2012 BS_{74}	—	November 22, 2011	Mount Lemmon	Mount Lemmon Survey	EUN	1.2 km	MPC · JPL
491373	2012 BE_{75}	—	August 13, 2010	Kitt Peak	Spacewatch	·	1.6 km	MPC · JPL
491374	2012 BL_{75}	—	February 10, 2002	Socorro	LINEAR	H	480 m	MPC · JPL
491375	2012 BV_{77}	—	January 30, 2008	Mount Lemmon	Mount Lemmon Survey	·	1.2 km	MPC · JPL
491376	2012 BQ_{78}	—	July 31, 2009	Kitt Peak	Spacewatch	·	2.6 km	MPC · JPL
491377	2012 BB_{85}	—	January 27, 2012	Mount Lemmon	Mount Lemmon Survey	AGN	920 m	MPC · JPL
491378	2012 BH_{87}	—	November 15, 2006	Mount Lemmon	Mount Lemmon Survey	·	1.7 km	MPC · JPL
491379	2012 BN_{89}	—	January 18, 2012	Kitt Peak	Spacewatch	·	1.6 km	MPC · JPL
491380	2012 BG_{92}	—	December 25, 2011	Mount Lemmon	Mount Lemmon Survey	EUN	1.1 km	MPC · JPL
491381	2012 BW_{121}	—	December 24, 2011	Mount Lemmon	Mount Lemmon Survey	·	1.7 km	MPC · JPL
491382	2012 BB_{135}	—	January 1, 2012	Mount Lemmon	Mount Lemmon Survey	·	1.4 km	MPC · JPL
491383	2012 BS_{138}	—	January 19, 2012	Haleakala	Pan-STARRS 1	·	1.4 km	MPC · JPL
491384	2012 BZ_{145}	—	December 28, 2011	Kitt Peak	Spacewatch	·	1.6 km	MPC · JPL
491385	2012 BL_{149}	—	January 19, 2012	Haleakala	Pan-STARRS 1	·	750 m	MPC · JPL
491386	2012 CZ_{5}	—	January 19, 2012	Haleakala	Pan-STARRS 1	ADE	2.0 km	MPC · JPL
491387	2012 CQ_{6}	—	December 12, 2006	Mount Lemmon	Mount Lemmon Survey	·	1.8 km	MPC · JPL
491388	2012 CQ_{12}	—	August 27, 2005	Palomar	NEAT	·	1.6 km	MPC · JPL
491389	2012 CB_{18}	—	January 29, 2012	Catalina	CSS	·	1.8 km	MPC · JPL
491390	2012 CJ_{18}	—	March 30, 2008	Catalina	CSS	·	1.6 km	MPC · JPL
491391	2012 CJ_{19}	—	January 25, 2012	Haleakala	Pan-STARRS 1	·	1.9 km	MPC · JPL
491392	2012 CG_{20}	—	October 2, 2005	Mount Lemmon	Mount Lemmon Survey	KOR	1.2 km	MPC · JPL
491393	2012 CR_{22}	—	December 25, 2011	Mount Lemmon	Mount Lemmon Survey	·	1.9 km	MPC · JPL
491394	2012 CS_{29}	—	January 18, 2012	Kitt Peak	Spacewatch	·	1.5 km	MPC · JPL
491395	2012 CL_{34}	—	January 26, 2012	Mount Lemmon	Mount Lemmon Survey	·	1.6 km	MPC · JPL
491396	2012 CG_{35}	—	January 4, 2012	Mount Lemmon	Mount Lemmon Survey	·	1.7 km	MPC · JPL
491397	2012 CY_{45}	—	January 19, 2012	Haleakala	Pan-STARRS 1	·	1.8 km	MPC · JPL
491398	2012 CH_{46}	—	November 6, 2010	Mount Lemmon	Mount Lemmon Survey	HOF	2.1 km	MPC · JPL
491399	2012 CL_{55}	—	December 28, 2011	Catalina	CSS	·	2.2 km	MPC · JPL
491400	2012 DA_{4}	—	January 22, 2012	Haleakala	Pan-STARRS 1	·	2.2 km	MPC · JPL

== 491401–491500 ==
back to top

Designation			Discovery			Properties		Ref
Permanent	Provisional	Named after	Date	Site	Discoverer(s)	Category	Diam.	Ref
491401	2012 DB_{5}	—	January 19, 2012	Haleakala	Pan-STARRS 1	GEF	950 m	MPC · JPL
491402	2012 DD_{9}	—	January 19, 2012	Kitt Peak	Spacewatch	·	1.9 km	MPC · JPL
491403	2012 DC_{11}	—	September 30, 2007	Kitt Peak	Spacewatch	L4	7.8 km	MPC · JPL
491404	2012 DT_{11}	—	January 19, 2012	Haleakala	Pan-STARRS 1	·	1.7 km	MPC · JPL
491405	2012 DN_{18}	—	May 28, 2008	Mount Lemmon	Mount Lemmon Survey	·	1.7 km	MPC · JPL
491406	2012 DR_{20}	—	November 10, 2010	Mount Lemmon	Mount Lemmon Survey	(12739)	1.6 km	MPC · JPL
491407	2012 DX_{22}	—	February 1, 2012	Kitt Peak	Spacewatch	·	1.8 km	MPC · JPL
491408	2012 DP_{34}	—	March 21, 2007	Mount Lemmon	Mount Lemmon Survey	·	1.9 km	MPC · JPL
491409	2012 DO_{36}	—	February 24, 2012	Haleakala	Pan-STARRS 1	V	530 m	MPC · JPL
491410	2012 DJ_{38}	—	November 6, 2010	Mount Lemmon	Mount Lemmon Survey	·	2.0 km	MPC · JPL
491411	2012 DL_{52}	—	February 13, 2012	Haleakala	Pan-STARRS 1	·	1.1 km	MPC · JPL
491412	2012 DA_{61}	—	February 28, 2012	Haleakala	Pan-STARRS 1	H	410 m	MPC · JPL
491413	2012 DE_{62}	—	February 21, 2012	Kitt Peak	Spacewatch	H	470 m	MPC · JPL
491414	2012 DH_{63}	—	February 6, 2007	Mount Lemmon	Mount Lemmon Survey	GEF	990 m	MPC · JPL
491415	2012 DQ_{63}	—	February 14, 2012	Haleakala	Pan-STARRS 1	·	650 m	MPC · JPL
491416	2012 DB_{78}	—	November 3, 2011	Mount Lemmon	Mount Lemmon Survey	·	2.1 km	MPC · JPL
491417	2012 DL_{90}	—	January 21, 2012	Kitt Peak	Spacewatch	·	1.7 km	MPC · JPL
491418	2012 DJ_{94}	—	February 3, 2012	Haleakala	Pan-STARRS 1	·	1.9 km	MPC · JPL
491419	2012 DE_{95}	—	January 19, 2012	Haleakala	Pan-STARRS 1	·	1.5 km	MPC · JPL
491420	2012 EG_{4}	—	December 4, 2011	Haleakala	Pan-STARRS 1	·	2.2 km	MPC · JPL
491421	2012 EQ_{4}	—	February 25, 2007	Kitt Peak	Spacewatch	·	1.7 km	MPC · JPL
491422	2012 EE_{5}	—	March 13, 2012	Kitt Peak	Spacewatch	·	1.6 km	MPC · JPL
491423	2012 EQ_{7}	—	February 16, 2012	Haleakala	Pan-STARRS 1	GEF	1.5 km	MPC · JPL
491424	2012 ET_{14}	—	March 15, 2012	Mount Lemmon	Mount Lemmon Survey	APO +1km	1.1 km	MPC · JPL
491425	2012 EU_{15}	—	February 24, 2012	Mount Lemmon	Mount Lemmon Survey	H	540 m	MPC · JPL
491426	2012 EV_{16}	—	June 17, 2005	Mount Lemmon	Mount Lemmon Survey	MAR	1.4 km	MPC · JPL
491427	2012 EZ_{16}	—	February 20, 2012	Haleakala	Pan-STARRS 1	·	1.9 km	MPC · JPL
491428	2012 FO_{1}	—	March 4, 2012	Catalina	CSS	·	2.5 km	MPC · JPL
491429	2012 FZ_{7}	—	December 5, 2007	Mount Lemmon	Mount Lemmon Survey	·	800 m	MPC · JPL
491430	2012 FR_{8}	—	January 28, 2007	Mount Lemmon	Mount Lemmon Survey	·	1.6 km	MPC · JPL
491431	2012 FW_{10}	—	September 27, 2009	Mount Lemmon	Mount Lemmon Survey	·	1.7 km	MPC · JPL
491432	2012 FS_{14}	—	March 13, 2007	Mount Lemmon	Mount Lemmon Survey	H	410 m	MPC · JPL
491433	2012 FT_{20}	—	December 2, 2005	Mount Lemmon	Mount Lemmon Survey	KOR	1.1 km	MPC · JPL
491434	2012 FB_{22}	—	February 26, 2012	Kitt Peak	Spacewatch	·	2.4 km	MPC · JPL
491435	2012 FB_{25}	—	March 11, 2007	Kitt Peak	Spacewatch	·	1.6 km	MPC · JPL
491436	2012 FY_{25}	—	February 27, 2012	Haleakala	Pan-STARRS 1	·	930 m	MPC · JPL
491437	2012 FX_{32}	—	March 14, 2012	Mount Lemmon	Mount Lemmon Survey	·	2.0 km	MPC · JPL
491438	2012 FX_{42}	—	April 6, 2008	Kitt Peak	Spacewatch	·	2.3 km	MPC · JPL
491439	2012 FZ_{43}	—	February 27, 2012	Kitt Peak	Spacewatch	·	2.0 km	MPC · JPL
491440	2012 FC_{44}	—	March 23, 2012	Kitt Peak	Spacewatch	·	2.5 km	MPC · JPL
491441	2012 FG_{49}	—	October 18, 2009	Mount Lemmon	Mount Lemmon Survey	KOR	1.2 km	MPC · JPL
491442	2012 FY_{49}	—	February 25, 2012	Kitt Peak	Spacewatch	·	1.4 km	MPC · JPL
491443	2012 FM_{55}	—	February 14, 2012	Haleakala	Pan-STARRS 1	·	1.7 km	MPC · JPL
491444	2012 FX_{60}	—	March 16, 2012	Kitt Peak	Spacewatch	·	1.9 km	MPC · JPL
491445	2012 FR_{61}	—	September 5, 2010	Mount Lemmon	Mount Lemmon Survey	H	280 m	MPC · JPL
491446	2012 FL_{62}	—	March 29, 2012	Haleakala	Pan-STARRS 1	H	480 m	MPC · JPL
491447	2012 FY_{63}	—	February 28, 2012	Haleakala	Pan-STARRS 1	·	1.3 km	MPC · JPL
491448	2012 FD_{65}	—	March 13, 2007	Kitt Peak	Spacewatch	·	1.7 km	MPC · JPL
491449	2012 FJ_{65}	—	August 28, 2009	Kitt Peak	Spacewatch	·	1.7 km	MPC · JPL
491450	2012 FU_{66}	—	February 28, 2012	Haleakala	Pan-STARRS 1	AGN	1.1 km	MPC · JPL
491451	2012 FE_{68}	—	October 28, 2010	Mount Lemmon	Mount Lemmon Survey	DOR	2.0 km	MPC · JPL
491452	2012 FO_{68}	—	February 28, 2012	Haleakala	Pan-STARRS 1	·	1.9 km	MPC · JPL
491453	2012 FC_{74}	—	February 28, 2012	Haleakala	Pan-STARRS 1	·	1.6 km	MPC · JPL
491454	2012 FF_{74}	—	March 23, 2012	Kitt Peak	Spacewatch	·	3.2 km	MPC · JPL
491455	2012 FC_{79}	—	October 17, 2010	Mount Lemmon	Mount Lemmon Survey	·	1.5 km	MPC · JPL
491456	2012 GQ	—	April 2, 2012	Haleakala	Pan-STARRS 1	H	520 m	MPC · JPL
491457	2012 GS_{1}	—	April 7, 2007	Catalina	CSS	H	490 m	MPC · JPL
491458	2012 GC_{16}	—	April 13, 2012	Kitt Peak	Spacewatch	·	3.5 km	MPC · JPL
491459	2012 GO_{21}	—	February 10, 2011	Mount Lemmon	Mount Lemmon Survey	·	2.6 km	MPC · JPL
491460	2012 GJ_{27}	—	January 30, 2012	Haleakala	Pan-STARRS 1	·	3.0 km	MPC · JPL
491461	2012 GQ_{27}	—	May 15, 2007	Mount Lemmon	Mount Lemmon Survey	H	350 m	MPC · JPL
491462	2012 GE_{30}	—	March 13, 2007	Mount Lemmon	Mount Lemmon Survey	·	1.8 km	MPC · JPL
491463	2012 GZ_{35}	—	March 15, 2012	Mount Lemmon	Mount Lemmon Survey	·	3.1 km	MPC · JPL
491464	2012 GZ_{38}	—	April 15, 2012	Haleakala	Pan-STARRS 1	·	2.3 km	MPC · JPL
491465	2012 HU	—	November 23, 2008	Catalina	CSS	H	620 m	MPC · JPL
491466	2012 HZ	—	March 20, 2007	Catalina	CSS	BRA	1.7 km	MPC · JPL
491467	2012 HJ_{10}	—	April 15, 2012	Haleakala	Pan-STARRS 1	EOS	2.0 km	MPC · JPL
491468	2012 HU_{11}	—	February 1, 2006	Kitt Peak	Spacewatch	·	1.9 km	MPC · JPL
491469	2012 HX_{11}	—	January 29, 2011	Mount Lemmon	Mount Lemmon Survey	·	1.8 km	MPC · JPL
491470	2012 HS_{12}	—	April 21, 2012	Mount Lemmon	Mount Lemmon Survey	·	2.6 km	MPC · JPL
491471	2012 HD_{13}	—	January 26, 2011	Mount Lemmon	Mount Lemmon Survey	EMA	3.3 km	MPC · JPL
491472	2012 HL_{14}	—	February 22, 2007	Catalina	CSS	GEF	1.8 km	MPC · JPL
491473	2012 HQ_{14}	—	March 29, 2007	Kitt Peak	Spacewatch	H	320 m	MPC · JPL
491474	2012 HQ_{15}	—	April 24, 2012	Mount Lemmon	Mount Lemmon Survey	H	420 m	MPC · JPL
491475	2012 HL_{17}	—	March 6, 2011	Mount Lemmon	Mount Lemmon Survey	·	2.8 km	MPC · JPL
491476	2012 HV_{18}	—	April 21, 2012	Haleakala	Pan-STARRS 1	·	2.9 km	MPC · JPL
491477	2012 HE_{25}	—	October 6, 2005	Kitt Peak	Spacewatch	H	380 m	MPC · JPL
491478	2012 HC_{26}	—	April 15, 2012	Haleakala	Pan-STARRS 1	BRA	1.4 km	MPC · JPL
491479	2012 HU_{26}	—	March 29, 2012	Mount Lemmon	Mount Lemmon Survey	·	1.8 km	MPC · JPL
491480	2012 HS_{41}	—	February 27, 2006	Kitt Peak	Spacewatch	THM	2.1 km	MPC · JPL
491481	2012 HQ_{43}	—	February 1, 2006	Kitt Peak	Spacewatch	·	1.7 km	MPC · JPL
491482	2012 HS_{43}	—	January 31, 2006	Kitt Peak	Spacewatch	·	1.7 km	MPC · JPL
491483	2012 HY_{43}	—	October 23, 2009	Kitt Peak	Spacewatch	EOS	1.7 km	MPC · JPL
491484	2012 HM_{45}	—	March 24, 2012	Kitt Peak	Spacewatch	·	1.3 km	MPC · JPL
491485	2012 HQ_{45}	—	October 31, 2010	Mount Lemmon	Mount Lemmon Survey	H	430 m	MPC · JPL
491486	2012 HR_{45}	—	March 15, 2007	Mount Lemmon	Mount Lemmon Survey	·	1.7 km	MPC · JPL
491487	2012 HP_{46}	—	April 21, 2012	Kitt Peak	Spacewatch	·	2.7 km	MPC · JPL
491488	2012 HT_{51}	—	October 1, 2008	Mount Lemmon	Mount Lemmon Survey	·	2.2 km	MPC · JPL
491489	2012 HU_{57}	—	January 29, 2011	Mount Lemmon	Mount Lemmon Survey	·	2.7 km	MPC · JPL
491490	2012 HV_{63}	—	May 12, 2007	Mount Lemmon	Mount Lemmon Survey	·	1.7 km	MPC · JPL
491491	2012 HC_{64}	—	September 23, 2008	Mount Lemmon	Mount Lemmon Survey	·	2.4 km	MPC · JPL
491492	2012 HJ_{66}	—	November 16, 2009	Mount Lemmon	Mount Lemmon Survey	·	2.4 km	MPC · JPL
491493	2012 HQ_{71}	—	January 30, 2012	Haleakala	Pan-STARRS 1	·	1.8 km	MPC · JPL
491494	2012 HP_{75}	—	February 1, 2006	Kitt Peak	Spacewatch	·	2.0 km	MPC · JPL
491495	2012 HK_{78}	—	April 21, 2012	Mount Lemmon	Mount Lemmon Survey	·	3.2 km	MPC · JPL
491496	2012 HV_{81}	—	September 25, 2008	Kitt Peak	Spacewatch	T_{j} (2.99)	3.4 km	MPC · JPL
491497	2012 JG	—	April 19, 2012	Mount Lemmon	Mount Lemmon Survey	H	370 m	MPC · JPL
491498	2012 JO	—	April 29, 2012	Catalina	CSS	H	540 m	MPC · JPL
491499	2012 JN_{1}	—	October 4, 2002	Socorro	LINEAR	·	2.8 km	MPC · JPL
491500	2012 JY_{4}	—	April 15, 2004	Anderson Mesa	LONEOS	H	620 m	MPC · JPL

== 491501–491600 ==
back to top

Designation			Discovery			Properties		Ref
Permanent	Provisional	Named after	Date	Site	Discoverer(s)	Category	Diam.	Ref
491501	2012 JH_{6}	—	October 24, 2008	Kitt Peak	Spacewatch	·	2.8 km	MPC · JPL
491502	2012 JA_{10}	—	March 28, 2012	Mount Lemmon	Mount Lemmon Survey	·	2.8 km	MPC · JPL
491503	2012 JX_{10}	—	May 12, 2012	Kitt Peak	Spacewatch	EOS	2.1 km	MPC · JPL
491504	2012 JK_{11}	—	November 16, 2010	Catalina	CSS	H	540 m	MPC · JPL
491505	2012 JO_{11}	—	April 14, 2012	Haleakala	Pan-STARRS 1	H	470 m	MPC · JPL
491506	2012 JA_{12}	—	October 7, 2008	Mount Lemmon	Mount Lemmon Survey	·	3.1 km	MPC · JPL
491507	2012 JV_{13}	—	November 8, 2009	Mount Lemmon	Mount Lemmon Survey	EOS	1.6 km	MPC · JPL
491508	2012 JU_{15}	—	November 13, 2010	Mount Lemmon	Mount Lemmon Survey	·	2.8 km	MPC · JPL
491509	2012 JO_{18}	—	April 25, 2006	Kitt Peak	Spacewatch	·	2.7 km	MPC · JPL
491510	2012 JH_{19}	—	January 30, 2012	Haleakala	Pan-STARRS 1	·	2.0 km	MPC · JPL
491511	2012 JG_{22}	—	March 16, 2007	Mount Lemmon	Mount Lemmon Survey	H	520 m	MPC · JPL
491512	2012 JF_{23}	—	May 11, 2007	Mount Lemmon	Mount Lemmon Survey	TEL	2.1 km	MPC · JPL
491513	2012 JK_{27}	—	May 11, 2012	Kitt Peak	Spacewatch	H	440 m	MPC · JPL
491514	2012 JC_{29}	—	September 21, 2009	Mount Lemmon	Mount Lemmon Survey	·	2.5 km	MPC · JPL
491515	2012 JG_{32}	—	April 28, 2012	Mount Lemmon	Mount Lemmon Survey	·	1.4 km	MPC · JPL
491516	2012 JA_{38}	—	November 1, 2008	Mount Lemmon	Mount Lemmon Survey	·	3.2 km	MPC · JPL
491517	2012 JX_{44}	—	May 15, 2012	Haleakala	Pan-STARRS 1	·	1.6 km	MPC · JPL
491518	2012 JP_{45}	—	May 15, 2012	Haleakala	Pan-STARRS 1	·	3.8 km	MPC · JPL
491519	2012 JN_{54}	—	May 1, 2006	Kitt Peak	Spacewatch	CYB	4.2 km	MPC · JPL
491520	2012 KB	—	April 30, 2012	Mount Lemmon	Mount Lemmon Survey	H	580 m	MPC · JPL
491521	2012 KF_{1}	—	February 3, 2009	Catalina	CSS	H	530 m	MPC · JPL
491522	2012 KP_{3}	—	March 27, 1995	Kitt Peak	Spacewatch	·	2.2 km	MPC · JPL
491523	2012 KA_{6}	—	May 16, 2012	Haleakala	Pan-STARRS 1	H	590 m	MPC · JPL
491524	2012 KK_{10}	—	November 30, 2003	Kitt Peak	Spacewatch	·	3.3 km	MPC · JPL
491525	2012 KH_{17}	—	February 5, 2011	Haleakala	Pan-STARRS 1	HYG	2.4 km	MPC · JPL
491526	2012 KZ_{18}	—	May 18, 2012	Kitt Peak	Spacewatch	·	2.8 km	MPC · JPL
491527	2012 KP_{20}	—	February 9, 2011	Mount Lemmon	Mount Lemmon Survey	·	2.1 km	MPC · JPL
491528	2012 KE_{22}	—	March 15, 2012	Mount Lemmon	Mount Lemmon Survey	·	2.2 km	MPC · JPL
491529	2012 KC_{23}	—	September 29, 2009	Mount Lemmon	Mount Lemmon Survey	·	1.5 km	MPC · JPL
491530	2012 KZ_{24}	—	January 27, 2006	Kitt Peak	Spacewatch	·	1.8 km	MPC · JPL
491531	2012 KD_{42}	—	May 21, 2012	Haleakala	Pan-STARRS 1	EOS	2.0 km	MPC · JPL
491532	2012 KE_{44}	—	February 13, 2011	Mount Lemmon	Mount Lemmon Survey	·	2.1 km	MPC · JPL
491533	2012 KX_{44}	—	May 16, 2012	Kitt Peak	Spacewatch	·	1.6 km	MPC · JPL
491534	2012 KR_{45}	—	February 26, 2011	Mount Lemmon	Mount Lemmon Survey	·	1.8 km	MPC · JPL
491535	2012 KB_{48}	—	May 15, 2012	Haleakala	Pan-STARRS 1	·	3.0 km	MPC · JPL
491536	2012 LD	—	October 17, 2010	Mount Lemmon	Mount Lemmon Survey	H	470 m	MPC · JPL
491537	2012 LU_{2}	—	May 1, 2006	Kitt Peak	Spacewatch	·	3.1 km	MPC · JPL
491538	2012 LW_{8}	—	February 25, 2011	Mount Lemmon	Mount Lemmon Survey	·	2.2 km	MPC · JPL
491539	2012 LG_{12}	—	June 14, 2012	Mount Lemmon	Mount Lemmon Survey	·	3.5 km	MPC · JPL
491540	2012 LN_{14}	—	May 16, 2012	Haleakala	Pan-STARRS 1	·	2.1 km	MPC · JPL
491541	2012 LV_{15}	—	September 18, 2007	Siding Spring	SSS	·	3.4 km	MPC · JPL
491542	2012 LA_{16}	—	September 29, 2008	Mount Lemmon	Mount Lemmon Survey	EOS	1.6 km	MPC · JPL
491543	2012 LX_{16}	—	November 18, 2009	Kitt Peak	Spacewatch	·	4.0 km	MPC · JPL
491544	2012 LW_{18}	—	May 20, 2012	Mount Lemmon	Mount Lemmon Survey	·	3.1 km	MPC · JPL
491545	2012 LE_{19}	—	May 21, 2012	Mount Lemmon	Mount Lemmon Survey	·	2.5 km	MPC · JPL
491546	2012 LO_{19}	—	May 21, 2012	Mount Lemmon	Mount Lemmon Survey	·	2.5 km	MPC · JPL
491547	2012 LJ_{21}	—	April 28, 2012	Kitt Peak	Spacewatch	·	3.1 km	MPC · JPL
491548	2012 LM_{23}	—	March 6, 2010	WISE	WISE	·	4.0 km	MPC · JPL
491549	2012 LU_{26}	—	February 7, 2010	WISE	WISE	·	8.8 km	MPC · JPL
491550	2012 LV_{26}	—	February 25, 2006	Kitt Peak	Spacewatch	·	2.3 km	MPC · JPL
491551	2012 MA_{1}	—	February 27, 2006	Catalina	CSS	·	2.2 km	MPC · JPL
491552	2012 MV_{6}	—	June 1, 2012	Mount Lemmon	Mount Lemmon Survey	·	3.4 km	MPC · JPL
491553	2012 PA_{5}	—	October 5, 2008	La Sagra	OAM	·	2.1 km	MPC · JPL
491554	2012 PP_{12}	—	August 10, 2012	Kitt Peak	Spacewatch	·	850 m	MPC · JPL
491555	2012 PH_{29}	—	August 13, 2012	Haleakala	Pan-STARRS 1	·	1.3 km	MPC · JPL
491556	2012 PB_{31}	—	October 6, 2008	Catalina	CSS	·	1.9 km	MPC · JPL
491557	2012 PL_{37}	—	August 14, 2012	Haleakala	Pan-STARRS 1	·	1.3 km	MPC · JPL
491558	2012 QF	—	July 28, 2011	Haleakala	Pan-STARRS 1	·	2.4 km	MPC · JPL
491559	2012 QA_{4}	—	September 5, 2008	Kitt Peak	Spacewatch	·	1.2 km	MPC · JPL
491560	2012 QT_{6}	—	August 17, 2012	Haleakala	Pan-STARRS 1	MAS	690 m	MPC · JPL
491561	2012 QY_{7}	—	April 6, 2011	Mount Lemmon	Mount Lemmon Survey	T_{j} (2.98)	3.0 km	MPC · JPL
491562	2012 QU_{14}	—	December 7, 2005	Kitt Peak	Spacewatch	·	1.2 km	MPC · JPL
491563	2012 QD_{26}	—	October 11, 2007	Kitt Peak	Spacewatch	·	2.3 km	MPC · JPL
491564	2012 QU_{40}	—	August 11, 2012	Siding Spring	SSS	·	1.1 km	MPC · JPL
491565	2012 QF_{49}	—	August 26, 2012	Haleakala	Pan-STARRS 1	AMO +1km	1.2 km	MPC · JPL
491566	2012 RG_{1}	—	August 14, 2012	Haleakala	Pan-STARRS 1	·	1.4 km	MPC · JPL
491567	2012 RG_{3}	—	September 6, 2012	Haleakala	Pan-STARRS 1	APO +1km	870 m	MPC · JPL
491568	2012 RS_{7}	—	September 30, 2008	Catalina	CSS	·	1.5 km	MPC · JPL
491569	2012 RO_{8}	—	July 26, 2008	La Sagra	OAM	V	1.0 km	MPC · JPL
491570	2012 RP_{11}	—	September 30, 2006	Mount Lemmon	Mount Lemmon Survey	·	3.5 km	MPC · JPL
491571	2012 RW_{11}	—	September 8, 1999	Socorro	LINEAR	(1547)	1.2 km	MPC · JPL
491572	2012 RF_{12}	—	October 15, 1998	Xinglong	SCAP	·	2.6 km	MPC · JPL
491573	2012 RJ_{12}	—	September 12, 2012	La Sagra	OAM	·	2.8 km	MPC · JPL
491574	2012 RO_{14}	—	September 15, 2012	Kitt Peak	Spacewatch	EUN	1.2 km	MPC · JPL
491575	2012 RF_{19}	—	September 14, 2012	Catalina	CSS	·	1.9 km	MPC · JPL
491576	2012 RP_{21}	—	October 25, 2008	Kitt Peak	Spacewatch	·	910 m	MPC · JPL
491577	2012 RD_{22}	—	August 25, 2012	Haleakala	Pan-STARRS 1	·	1.3 km	MPC · JPL
491578	2012 RP_{26}	—	August 25, 2012	Haleakala	Pan-STARRS 1	·	860 m	MPC · JPL
491579	2012 RE_{35}	—	November 18, 2003	Kitt Peak	Spacewatch	AGN	1.1 km	MPC · JPL
491580	2012 RQ_{37}	—	February 5, 2000	Kitt Peak	Spacewatch	·	1.4 km	MPC · JPL
491581	2012 RO_{38}	—	February 26, 2011	Mount Lemmon	Mount Lemmon Survey	·	1.0 km	MPC · JPL
491582	2012 RY_{39}	—	November 6, 2008	Mount Lemmon	Mount Lemmon Survey	·	940 m	MPC · JPL
491583	2012 SU_{3}	—	September 6, 2008	Mount Lemmon	Mount Lemmon Survey	·	1.1 km	MPC · JPL
491584	2012 SZ_{3}	—	November 9, 1999	Socorro	LINEAR	·	1.4 km	MPC · JPL
491585	2012 SL_{6}	—	February 14, 2009	Mount Lemmon	Mount Lemmon Survey	·	1.6 km	MPC · JPL
491586	2012 SC_{15}	—	September 17, 2012	Mount Lemmon	Mount Lemmon Survey	·	550 m	MPC · JPL
491587	2012 SD_{19}	—	September 17, 2012	Kitt Peak	Spacewatch	·	2.5 km	MPC · JPL
491588	2012 SG_{21}	—	August 28, 2012	Mount Lemmon	Mount Lemmon Survey	·	1.8 km	MPC · JPL
491589	2012 SS_{21}	—	September 6, 2008	Mount Lemmon	Mount Lemmon Survey	MAS	670 m	MPC · JPL
491590	2012 SR_{26}	—	August 24, 2007	Kitt Peak	Spacewatch	·	1.5 km	MPC · JPL
491591	2012 SV_{33}	—	September 29, 2008	Mount Lemmon	Mount Lemmon Survey	(5)	1.1 km	MPC · JPL
491592	2012 SZ_{33}	—	August 26, 2012	Haleakala	Pan-STARRS 1	NYS	1.0 km	MPC · JPL
491593	2012 SB_{46}	—	August 26, 2012	Haleakala	Pan-STARRS 1	·	1.6 km	MPC · JPL
491594	2012 SM_{55}	—	September 6, 2008	Mount Lemmon	Mount Lemmon Survey	MAS	720 m	MPC · JPL
491595	2012 SV_{58}	—	September 6, 2008	Mount Lemmon	Mount Lemmon Survey	·	1.1 km	MPC · JPL
491596	2012 SC_{60}	—	October 14, 2007	Kitt Peak	Spacewatch	·	2.0 km	MPC · JPL
491597	2012 SU_{61}	—	September 13, 2007	Mount Lemmon	Mount Lemmon Survey	·	1.3 km	MPC · JPL
491598	2012 SG_{62}	—	December 4, 2008	Mount Lemmon	Mount Lemmon Survey	·	930 m	MPC · JPL
491599	2012 SK_{63}	—	April 1, 2011	Mount Lemmon	Mount Lemmon Survey	·	1.2 km	MPC · JPL
491600	2012 SG_{64}	—	September 3, 2007	Mount Lemmon	Mount Lemmon Survey	BRA	1.6 km	MPC · JPL

== 491601–491700 ==
back to top

Designation			Discovery			Properties		Ref
Permanent	Provisional	Named after	Date	Site	Discoverer(s)	Category	Diam.	Ref
491601	2012 TH_{6}	—	September 28, 2003	Kitt Peak	Spacewatch	·	1.4 km	MPC · JPL
491602	2012 TW_{11}	—	September 7, 2008	Catalina	CSS	NYS	1.0 km	MPC · JPL
491603	2012 TB_{16}	—	December 4, 2008	Kitt Peak	Spacewatch	·	1.3 km	MPC · JPL
491604	2012 TY_{17}	—	September 16, 2012	Mount Lemmon	Mount Lemmon Survey	·	2.8 km	MPC · JPL
491605	2012 TV_{21}	—	March 30, 2011	Mount Lemmon	Mount Lemmon Survey	MAS	560 m	MPC · JPL
491606	2012 TP_{25}	—	October 20, 2008	Mount Lemmon	Mount Lemmon Survey	·	810 m	MPC · JPL
491607	2012 TC_{30}	—	September 16, 2003	Kitt Peak	Spacewatch	·	1.2 km	MPC · JPL
491608	2012 TS_{33}	—	October 28, 2005	Kitt Peak	Spacewatch	·	690 m	MPC · JPL
491609	2012 TO_{45}	—	January 25, 2009	Kitt Peak	Spacewatch	·	2.5 km	MPC · JPL
491610	2012 TS_{49}	—	September 23, 2001	Kitt Peak	Spacewatch	MAS	500 m	MPC · JPL
491611	2012 TX_{51}	—	January 19, 2005	Kitt Peak	Spacewatch	L5	10 km	MPC · JPL
491612	2012 TH_{54}	—	January 12, 2010	Kitt Peak	Spacewatch	·	750 m	MPC · JPL
491613	2012 TT_{54}	—	October 6, 2012	Kitt Peak	Spacewatch	·	670 m	MPC · JPL
491614	2012 TF_{55}	—	December 17, 2001	Socorro	LINEAR	·	3.5 km	MPC · JPL
491615	2012 TB_{57}	—	November 19, 2003	Kitt Peak	Spacewatch	·	1.9 km	MPC · JPL
491616	2012 TJ_{64}	—	September 15, 2007	Kitt Peak	Spacewatch	·	2.4 km	MPC · JPL
491617	2012 TW_{69}	—	October 7, 2007	Kitt Peak	Spacewatch	EOS	1.7 km	MPC · JPL
491618	2012 TJ_{76}	—	April 4, 2011	Mount Lemmon	Mount Lemmon Survey	·	1.2 km	MPC · JPL
491619	2012 TL_{91}	—	October 7, 2012	Haleakala	Pan-STARRS 1	THM	2.4 km	MPC · JPL
491620	2012 TP_{97}	—	September 16, 2012	Kitt Peak	Spacewatch	MAS	660 m	MPC · JPL
491621	2012 TE_{98}	—	October 8, 2012	Kitt Peak	Spacewatch	·	1.4 km	MPC · JPL
491622	2012 TE_{101}	—	September 26, 2006	Kitt Peak	Spacewatch	·	2.3 km	MPC · JPL
491623	2012 TR_{101}	—	September 26, 2008	Kitt Peak	Spacewatch	·	900 m	MPC · JPL
491624	2012 TR_{128}	—	April 23, 2011	Haleakala	Pan-STARRS 1	·	1.3 km	MPC · JPL
491625	2012 TW_{128}	—	September 25, 2006	Mount Lemmon	Mount Lemmon Survey	·	3.0 km	MPC · JPL
491626	2012 TL_{130}	—	March 1, 2011	Mount Lemmon	Mount Lemmon Survey	T_{j} (2.99)	3.4 km	MPC · JPL
491627	2012 TD_{139}	—	October 21, 2008	Kitt Peak	Spacewatch	·	1.2 km	MPC · JPL
491628	2012 TU_{149}	—	September 19, 2012	Mount Lemmon	Mount Lemmon Survey	·	2.2 km	MPC · JPL
491629	2012 TX_{152}	—	October 8, 2012	Haleakala	Pan-STARRS 1	·	1.2 km	MPC · JPL
491630	2012 TM_{153}	—	October 8, 2012	Haleakala	Pan-STARRS 1	·	1.0 km	MPC · JPL
491631	2012 TG_{154}	—	October 8, 2012	Haleakala	Pan-STARRS 1	MAS	740 m	MPC · JPL
491632	2012 TZ_{154}	—	November 20, 2008	Mount Lemmon	Mount Lemmon Survey	·	1.1 km	MPC · JPL
491633	2012 TZ_{169}	—	September 22, 2001	Kitt Peak	Spacewatch	·	2.8 km	MPC · JPL
491634	2012 TL_{171}	—	October 20, 2006	Kitt Peak	Spacewatch	CYB	2.8 km	MPC · JPL
491635	2012 TW_{183}	—	October 11, 2007	Kitt Peak	Spacewatch	·	1.7 km	MPC · JPL
491636	2012 TR_{186}	—	October 9, 2012	Mount Lemmon	Mount Lemmon Survey	·	990 m	MPC · JPL
491637	2012 TZ_{186}	—	October 9, 2012	Mount Lemmon	Mount Lemmon Survey	·	930 m	MPC · JPL
491638	2012 TN_{190}	—	December 27, 2005	Kitt Peak	Spacewatch	NYS	710 m	MPC · JPL
491639	2012 TH_{192}	—	August 28, 2006	Kitt Peak	Spacewatch	·	2.8 km	MPC · JPL
491640	2012 TR_{194}	—	November 19, 2001	Anderson Mesa	LONEOS	·	1.9 km	MPC · JPL
491641	2012 TM_{195}	—	September 26, 2005	Kitt Peak	Spacewatch	·	540 m	MPC · JPL
491642	2012 TV_{197}	—	December 31, 2008	Kitt Peak	Spacewatch	·	950 m	MPC · JPL
491643	2012 TD_{203}	—	October 1, 2008	Mount Lemmon	Mount Lemmon Survey	BRG	1.0 km	MPC · JPL
491644	2012 TN_{211}	—	January 16, 2010	Catalina	CSS	·	890 m	MPC · JPL
491645	2012 TO_{213}	—	October 11, 2012	Haleakala	Pan-STARRS 1	·	490 m	MPC · JPL
491646	2012 TA_{214}	—	September 26, 2008	Kitt Peak	Spacewatch	·	750 m	MPC · JPL
491647	2012 TV_{215}	—	October 17, 2001	Socorro	LINEAR	·	1.2 km	MPC · JPL
491648	2012 TS_{222}	—	October 14, 2012	Kitt Peak	Spacewatch	MRX	970 m	MPC · JPL
491649	2012 TX_{224}	—	November 20, 2008	Kitt Peak	Spacewatch	·	1.2 km	MPC · JPL
491650	2012 TC_{233}	—	November 19, 2008	Mount Lemmon	Mount Lemmon Survey	·	1.2 km	MPC · JPL
491651	2012 TR_{239}	—	January 31, 2009	Kitt Peak	Spacewatch	·	1.8 km	MPC · JPL
491652	2012 TK_{242}	—	November 9, 2008	Kitt Peak	Spacewatch	·	980 m	MPC · JPL
491653	2012 TT_{254}	—	November 6, 2005	Socorro	LINEAR	·	900 m	MPC · JPL
491654	2012 TE_{255}	—	October 22, 2008	Kitt Peak	Spacewatch	·	990 m	MPC · JPL
491655	2012 TN_{256}	—	September 23, 2008	Kitt Peak	Spacewatch	·	980 m	MPC · JPL
491656	2012 TY_{257}	—	August 21, 2004	Siding Spring	SSS	·	970 m	MPC · JPL
491657	2012 TJ_{258}	—	December 17, 2009	Kitt Peak	Spacewatch	·	520 m	MPC · JPL
491658	2012 TG_{287}	—	October 9, 2012	Kitt Peak	Spacewatch	·	1.5 km	MPC · JPL
491659	2012 TB_{292}	—	February 20, 2009	Mount Lemmon	Mount Lemmon Survey	·	2.9 km	MPC · JPL
491660	2012 TK_{292}	—	July 25, 2011	Haleakala	Pan-STARRS 1	VER	2.9 km	MPC · JPL
491661	2012 TG_{296}	—	October 18, 2003	Anderson Mesa	LONEOS	·	1.8 km	MPC · JPL
491662	2012 TK_{296}	—	September 20, 2003	Kitt Peak	Spacewatch	·	1.6 km	MPC · JPL
491663	2012 TE_{298}	—	October 16, 2007	Catalina	CSS	·	2.5 km	MPC · JPL
491664	2012 TD_{302}	—	August 26, 2012	Kitt Peak	Spacewatch	NYS	1.2 km	MPC · JPL
491665	2012 TO_{304}	—	October 8, 2012	Haleakala	Pan-STARRS 1	·	1.4 km	MPC · JPL
491666	2012 TY_{304}	—	November 19, 2008	Kitt Peak	Spacewatch	·	910 m	MPC · JPL
491667	2012 TM_{306}	—	September 17, 2012	Mount Lemmon	Mount Lemmon Survey	AGN	1.2 km	MPC · JPL
491668	2012 TK_{308}	—	July 28, 2011	Haleakala	Pan-STARRS 1	·	3.3 km	MPC · JPL
491669	2012 TA_{310}	—	October 9, 2007	Kitt Peak	Spacewatch	·	1.7 km	MPC · JPL
491670	2012 TG_{313}	—	October 22, 2008	Kitt Peak	Spacewatch	·	900 m	MPC · JPL
491671	2012 UU_{1}	—	October 16, 2012	Mount Lemmon	Mount Lemmon Survey	·	510 m	MPC · JPL
491672	2012 UV_{5}	—	October 16, 2012	Mount Lemmon	Mount Lemmon Survey	AST	1.6 km	MPC · JPL
491673	2012 UX_{12}	—	April 10, 2010	Mount Lemmon	Mount Lemmon Survey	·	1.7 km	MPC · JPL
491674	2012 UB_{23}	—	November 15, 2007	Mount Lemmon	Mount Lemmon Survey	EOS	1.7 km	MPC · JPL
491675	2012 UA_{31}	—	September 19, 2003	Kitt Peak	Spacewatch	ADE	1.6 km	MPC · JPL
491676	2012 UD_{31}	—	August 27, 2006	Kitt Peak	Spacewatch	THM	2.0 km	MPC · JPL
491677	2012 UF_{31}	—	October 16, 2012	Kitt Peak	Spacewatch	·	670 m	MPC · JPL
491678	2012 UL_{31}	—	October 16, 2012	Kitt Peak	Spacewatch	·	1.8 km	MPC · JPL
491679	2012 UL_{32}	—	September 16, 2012	Mount Lemmon	Mount Lemmon Survey	·	2.5 km	MPC · JPL
491680	2012 UD_{35}	—	October 8, 2012	Mount Lemmon	Mount Lemmon Survey	·	1.1 km	MPC · JPL
491681	2012 UY_{35}	—	October 10, 2007	Kitt Peak	Spacewatch	KOR	1.3 km	MPC · JPL
491682	2012 UM_{40}	—	April 23, 2011	Haleakala	Pan-STARRS 1	NYS	1.2 km	MPC · JPL
491683	2012 UY_{40}	—	October 8, 2012	Haleakala	Pan-STARRS 1	·	1.2 km	MPC · JPL
491684	2012 UC_{43}	—	September 12, 2007	Mount Lemmon	Mount Lemmon Survey	·	1.5 km	MPC · JPL
491685	2012 UW_{43}	—	October 17, 2012	Mount Lemmon	Mount Lemmon Survey	·	610 m	MPC · JPL
491686	2012 UD_{45}	—	October 18, 2012	Haleakala	Pan-STARRS 1	(12739)	1.4 km	MPC · JPL
491687	2012 UX_{45}	—	October 5, 2012	Kitt Peak	Spacewatch	·	580 m	MPC · JPL
491688	2012 UN_{47}	—	October 7, 2007	Mount Lemmon	Mount Lemmon Survey	EOS	1.4 km	MPC · JPL
491689	2012 UT_{49}	—	November 14, 1995	Kitt Peak	Spacewatch	·	1.1 km	MPC · JPL
491690	2012 UB_{65}	—	November 4, 2007	Kitt Peak	Spacewatch	·	1.8 km	MPC · JPL
491691	2012 US_{69}	—	December 30, 2007	Mount Lemmon	Mount Lemmon Survey	·	2.4 km	MPC · JPL
491692	2012 UE_{71}	—	October 8, 2012	Haleakala	Pan-STARRS 1	·	1.3 km	MPC · JPL
491693	2012 UV_{76}	—	March 24, 2009	Mount Lemmon	Mount Lemmon Survey	·	2.6 km	MPC · JPL
491694	2012 UX_{78}	—	October 6, 2012	Kitt Peak	Spacewatch	·	660 m	MPC · JPL
491695	2012 UN_{79}	—	March 28, 2009	Kitt Peak	Spacewatch	·	1.9 km	MPC · JPL
491696	2012 UA_{86}	—	July 26, 2011	Haleakala	Pan-STARRS 1	·	1.7 km	MPC · JPL
491697	2012 US_{87}	—	November 18, 2007	Kitt Peak	Spacewatch	·	1.7 km	MPC · JPL
491698	2012 UP_{90}	—	November 16, 2001	Kitt Peak	Spacewatch	THM	1.8 km	MPC · JPL
491699	2012 UX_{93}	—	October 21, 2008	Kitt Peak	Spacewatch	·	1.1 km	MPC · JPL
491700	2012 UV_{98}	—	October 8, 2012	Mount Lemmon	Mount Lemmon Survey	·	2.0 km	MPC · JPL

== 491701–491800 ==
back to top

Designation			Discovery			Properties		Ref
Permanent	Provisional	Named after	Date	Site	Discoverer(s)	Category	Diam.	Ref
491701	2012 UK_{103}	—	December 21, 2005	Kitt Peak	Spacewatch	·	760 m	MPC · JPL
491702	2012 UH_{105}	—	August 28, 2006	Kitt Peak	Spacewatch	·	2.6 km	MPC · JPL
491703	2012 US_{112}	—	October 11, 2012	Haleakala	Pan-STARRS 1	KOR	1.2 km	MPC · JPL
491704	2012 UF_{113}	—	October 14, 2001	Kitt Peak	Spacewatch	·	1.9 km	MPC · JPL
491705	2012 UR_{114}	—	October 30, 2007	Kitt Peak	Spacewatch	·	1.8 km	MPC · JPL
491706	2012 UJ_{115}	—	October 11, 2012	Haleakala	Pan-STARRS 1	·	1.1 km	MPC · JPL
491707	2012 UH_{116}	—	October 8, 2012	Kitt Peak	Spacewatch	·	1.6 km	MPC · JPL
491708	2012 UB_{121}	—	November 13, 2007	Kitt Peak	Spacewatch	·	2.2 km	MPC · JPL
491709	2012 UD_{129}	—	October 19, 2012	Mount Lemmon	Mount Lemmon Survey	·	2.8 km	MPC · JPL
491710	2012 UK_{130}	—	August 28, 2006	Siding Spring	SSS	·	3.5 km	MPC · JPL
491711	2012 UA_{131}	—	September 28, 2003	Socorro	LINEAR	·	1.3 km	MPC · JPL
491712	2012 UJ_{137}	—	November 19, 2008	Kitt Peak	Spacewatch	(5)	1.3 km	MPC · JPL
491713	2012 UD_{141}	—	September 4, 1999	Kitt Peak	Spacewatch	·	840 m	MPC · JPL
491714	2012 UQ_{143}	—	November 10, 2005	Kitt Peak	Spacewatch	·	740 m	MPC · JPL
491715	2012 UW_{143}	—	October 18, 2012	Haleakala	Pan-STARRS 1	AGN	1 km	MPC · JPL
491716	2012 UL_{145}	—	October 8, 2012	Haleakala	Pan-STARRS 1	·	1.7 km	MPC · JPL
491717	2012 UM_{147}	—	October 19, 2012	Haleakala	Pan-STARRS 1	·	2.3 km	MPC · JPL
491718	2012 UP_{153}	—	October 24, 2003	Socorro	LINEAR	·	1.4 km	MPC · JPL
491719	2012 UV_{153}	—	December 4, 2007	Kitt Peak	Spacewatch	THM	2.0 km	MPC · JPL
491720	2012 UT_{154}	—	October 14, 2012	Kitt Peak	Spacewatch	JUN	650 m	MPC · JPL
491721	2012 UU_{154}	—	October 14, 2012	Kitt Peak	Spacewatch	·	590 m	MPC · JPL
491722	2012 UZ_{155}	—	December 17, 2001	Socorro	LINEAR	·	2.8 km	MPC · JPL
491723	2012 UY_{162}	—	October 22, 2006	Mount Lemmon	Mount Lemmon Survey	VER	2.8 km	MPC · JPL
491724	2012 UC_{164}	—	October 22, 2012	Haleakala	Pan-STARRS 1	MRX	900 m	MPC · JPL
491725	2012 UR_{164}	—	October 10, 2012	Haleakala	Pan-STARRS 1	·	3.0 km	MPC · JPL
491726	2012 UK_{165}	—	June 27, 2010	WISE	WISE	·	3.7 km	MPC · JPL
491727	2012 UC_{169}	—	September 2, 2011	Haleakala	Pan-STARRS 1	3:2	4.8 km	MPC · JPL
491728	2012 UR_{172}	—	October 23, 2012	Mount Lemmon	Mount Lemmon Survey	·	2.0 km	MPC · JPL
491729	2012 UO_{174}	—	September 10, 2012	Siding Spring	SSS	·	960 m	MPC · JPL
491730	2012 VE	—	October 6, 2012	Haleakala	Pan-STARRS 1	·	1.8 km	MPC · JPL
491731	2012 VG_{2}	—	October 9, 2012	Haleakala	Pan-STARRS 1	H	630 m	MPC · JPL
491732	2012 VO_{3}	—	October 18, 2012	Haleakala	Pan-STARRS 1	·	1.3 km	MPC · JPL
491733	2012 VQ_{10}	—	October 22, 2012	Haleakala	Pan-STARRS 1	3:2	3.7 km	MPC · JPL
491734	2012 VS_{10}	—	December 11, 2001	Socorro	LINEAR	·	1.2 km	MPC · JPL
491735	2012 VC_{13}	—	October 24, 2001	Kitt Peak	Spacewatch	THM	2.0 km	MPC · JPL
491736	2012 VN_{17}	—	February 1, 2006	Kitt Peak	Spacewatch	3:2	4.2 km	MPC · JPL
491737	2012 VZ_{24}	—	November 5, 2012	Kitt Peak	Spacewatch	EUN	1.2 km	MPC · JPL
491738	2012 VF_{28}	—	October 19, 2007	Kitt Peak	Spacewatch	·	1.9 km	MPC · JPL
491739	2012 VQ_{29}	—	May 31, 2010	WISE	WISE	·	2.0 km	MPC · JPL
491740	2012 VL_{32}	—	October 21, 2012	Haleakala	Pan-STARRS 1	·	2.9 km	MPC · JPL
491741	2012 VD_{34}	—	August 30, 2011	Haleakala	Pan-STARRS 1	3:2	6.0 km	MPC · JPL
491742	2012 VH_{36}	—	October 21, 2012	Haleakala	Pan-STARRS 1	·	3.3 km	MPC · JPL
491743	2012 VD_{38}	—	October 20, 2012	Mount Lemmon	Mount Lemmon Survey	·	1.4 km	MPC · JPL
491744	2012 VM_{44}	—	November 7, 2012	Mount Lemmon	Mount Lemmon Survey	·	580 m	MPC · JPL
491745	2012 VV_{58}	—	August 29, 2006	Kitt Peak	Spacewatch	·	2.2 km	MPC · JPL
491746	2012 VX_{58}	—	December 22, 2008	Kitt Peak	Spacewatch	·	900 m	MPC · JPL
491747	2012 VA_{60}	—	May 7, 2010	Mount Lemmon	Mount Lemmon Survey	VER	2.5 km	MPC · JPL
491748	2012 VV_{68}	—	September 12, 2007	Mount Lemmon	Mount Lemmon Survey	·	1.3 km	MPC · JPL
491749	2012 VF_{70}	—	October 21, 2012	Haleakala	Pan-STARRS 1	·	1.8 km	MPC · JPL
491750	2012 VM_{71}	—	October 21, 2012	Kitt Peak	Spacewatch	·	670 m	MPC · JPL
491751	2012 VR_{72}	—	December 22, 2005	Kitt Peak	Spacewatch	MAS	540 m	MPC · JPL
491752	2012 VZ_{72}	—	October 21, 2012	Haleakala	Pan-STARRS 1	·	1.1 km	MPC · JPL
491753	2012 VT_{75}	—	May 24, 2011	Mount Lemmon	Mount Lemmon Survey	·	1.1 km	MPC · JPL
491754	2012 VR_{79}	—	October 21, 2012	Haleakala	Pan-STARRS 1	EOS	1.5 km	MPC · JPL
491755	2012 VE_{80}	—	January 17, 2009	Kitt Peak	Spacewatch	·	860 m	MPC · JPL
491756	2012 VM_{85}	—	November 4, 2012	Kitt Peak	Spacewatch	·	1.4 km	MPC · JPL
491757	2012 VH_{86}	—	August 4, 2011	Haleakala	Pan-STARRS 1	·	3.0 km	MPC · JPL
491758	2012 VL_{89}	—	October 22, 2012	Kitt Peak	Spacewatch	EOS	1.8 km	MPC · JPL
491759	2012 VL_{90}	—	November 19, 2008	Kitt Peak	Spacewatch	·	790 m	MPC · JPL
491760	2012 VO_{90}	—	October 26, 2012	Mount Lemmon	Mount Lemmon Survey	·	630 m	MPC · JPL
491761	2012 VJ_{93}	—	September 22, 2003	Kitt Peak	Spacewatch	·	1.1 km	MPC · JPL
491762	2012 VB_{98}	—	November 4, 2012	Kitt Peak	Spacewatch	·	2.2 km	MPC · JPL
491763	2012 VH_{106}	—	October 21, 2012	Haleakala	Pan-STARRS 1	PHO	790 m	MPC · JPL
491764	2012 VV_{107}	—	October 17, 1995	Kitt Peak	Spacewatch	·	2.6 km	MPC · JPL
491765	2012 VU_{110}	—	December 6, 2002	Socorro	LINEAR	·	490 m	MPC · JPL
491766	2012 VA_{111}	—	October 21, 2012	Haleakala	Pan-STARRS 1	·	1.2 km	MPC · JPL
491767	2012 VU_{113}	—	November 15, 2012	Cerro Tololo	DECam	plutino	136 km	MPC · JPL
491768	2012 VV_{113}	—	November 15, 2012	Cerro Tololo	DECam	cubewano (hot)	157 km	MPC · JPL
491769	2012 WO_{4}	—	August 19, 2003	Campo Imperatore	CINEOS	·	1.3 km	MPC · JPL
491770	2012 WP_{9}	—	November 5, 2012	Kitt Peak	Spacewatch	·	1.3 km	MPC · JPL
491771	2012 WU_{9}	—	January 26, 2006	Kitt Peak	Spacewatch	·	1.0 km	MPC · JPL
491772	2012 WU_{11}	—	October 1, 2005	Kitt Peak	Spacewatch	·	590 m	MPC · JPL
491773	2012 WY_{11}	—	October 9, 2012	Mount Lemmon	Mount Lemmon Survey	·	1.8 km	MPC · JPL
491774	2012 WU_{12}	—	November 14, 2012	Kitt Peak	Spacewatch	·	1.9 km	MPC · JPL
491775	2012 WB_{13}	—	August 21, 2011	Haleakala	Pan-STARRS 1	·	2.3 km	MPC · JPL
491776	2012 WA_{14}	—	September 25, 2006	Kitt Peak	Spacewatch	VER	2.2 km	MPC · JPL
491777	2012 WD_{14}	—	February 9, 2005	Mount Lemmon	Mount Lemmon Survey	MIS	1.7 km	MPC · JPL
491778	2012 WH_{14}	—	October 26, 2012	Mount Lemmon	Mount Lemmon Survey	(5)	790 m	MPC · JPL
491779	2012 WY_{15}	—	November 30, 2008	Kitt Peak	Spacewatch	(5)	1.1 km	MPC · JPL
491780	2012 WB_{16}	—	October 15, 2007	Mount Lemmon	Mount Lemmon Survey	AGN	1.0 km	MPC · JPL
491781	2012 WG_{16}	—	November 4, 2004	Catalina	CSS	3:2 · SHU	5.1 km	MPC · JPL
491782	2012 WG_{19}	—	November 30, 2005	Kitt Peak	Spacewatch	NYS	700 m	MPC · JPL
491783	2012 WS_{32}	—	January 11, 2010	Kitt Peak	Spacewatch	·	640 m	MPC · JPL
491784	2012 WK_{35}	—	September 22, 2003	Kitt Peak	Spacewatch	·	1.0 km	MPC · JPL
491785	2012 XW	—	November 21, 2008	Kitt Peak	Spacewatch	·	730 m	MPC · JPL
491786	2012 XN_{8}	—	November 23, 2012	Kitt Peak	Spacewatch	AGN	1.1 km	MPC · JPL
491787	2012 XP_{8}	—	November 21, 2009	Mount Lemmon	Mount Lemmon Survey	·	750 m	MPC · JPL
491788	2012 XC_{9}	—	September 19, 2008	Kitt Peak	Spacewatch	NYS	940 m	MPC · JPL
491789	2012 XY_{10}	—	December 4, 2007	Kitt Peak	Spacewatch	·	1.6 km	MPC · JPL
491790	2012 XC_{11}	—	October 14, 2012	Kitt Peak	Spacewatch	·	2.2 km	MPC · JPL
491791	2012 XE_{12}	—	October 22, 2012	Haleakala	Pan-STARRS 1	·	1.6 km	MPC · JPL
491792	2012 XX_{14}	—	September 11, 2007	Mount Lemmon	Mount Lemmon Survey	MRX	790 m	MPC · JPL
491793	2012 XF_{15}	—	March 10, 2007	Kitt Peak	Spacewatch	·	550 m	MPC · JPL
491794	2012 XD_{25}	—	September 18, 2006	Kitt Peak	Spacewatch	·	2.0 km	MPC · JPL
491795	2012 XV_{25}	—	January 22, 2006	Mount Lemmon	Mount Lemmon Survey	3:2	3.2 km	MPC · JPL
491796	2012 XD_{26}	—	November 17, 2008	Kitt Peak	Spacewatch	·	590 m	MPC · JPL
491797	2012 XD_{39}	—	December 3, 2012	Mount Lemmon	Mount Lemmon Survey	·	690 m	MPC · JPL
491798	2012 XH_{53}	—	November 15, 2012	Mount Lemmon	Mount Lemmon Survey	·	2.8 km	MPC · JPL
491799	2012 XD_{57}	—	October 22, 2012	Haleakala	Pan-STARRS 1	·	1.6 km	MPC · JPL
491800	2012 XL_{57}	—	October 18, 2008	Kitt Peak	Spacewatch	NYS	830 m	MPC · JPL

== 491801–491900 ==
back to top

Designation			Discovery			Properties		Ref
Permanent	Provisional	Named after	Date	Site	Discoverer(s)	Category	Diam.	Ref
491801	2012 XF_{62}	—	December 4, 2012	Mount Lemmon	Mount Lemmon Survey	·	550 m	MPC · JPL
491802	2012 XX_{70}	—	November 4, 2012	Kitt Peak	Spacewatch	(5)	930 m	MPC · JPL
491803	2012 XL_{80}	—	November 7, 2012	Mount Lemmon	Mount Lemmon Survey	·	850 m	MPC · JPL
491804	2012 XP_{83}	—	September 23, 2008	Kitt Peak	Spacewatch	·	790 m	MPC · JPL
491805	2012 XS_{94}	—	October 31, 2006	Mount Lemmon	Mount Lemmon Survey	·	2.8 km	MPC · JPL
491806	2012 XW_{96}	—	October 6, 2008	Mount Lemmon	Mount Lemmon Survey	·	1.0 km	MPC · JPL
491807	2012 XD_{103}	—	May 30, 2011	Haleakala	Pan-STARRS 1	(5)	1.3 km	MPC · JPL
491808	2012 XS_{104}	—	October 8, 2012	Mount Lemmon	Mount Lemmon Survey	·	410 m	MPC · JPL
491809	2012 XB_{106}	—	September 2, 2011	Haleakala	Pan-STARRS 1	·	1.9 km	MPC · JPL
491810	2012 XV_{108}	—	October 9, 2008	Mount Lemmon	Mount Lemmon Survey	MAS	490 m	MPC · JPL
491811	2012 XY_{112}	—	October 12, 2007	Catalina	CSS	·	1.7 km	MPC · JPL
491812	2012 XA_{115}	—	October 20, 2012	Kitt Peak	Spacewatch	·	570 m	MPC · JPL
491813	2012 XX_{115}	—	October 9, 2007	Catalina	CSS	·	2.2 km	MPC · JPL
491814	2012 XK_{118}	—	August 30, 2005	Kitt Peak	Spacewatch	·	460 m	MPC · JPL
491815	2012 XU_{118}	—	December 8, 2012	Mount Lemmon	Mount Lemmon Survey	·	550 m	MPC · JPL
491816	2012 XH_{145}	—	September 30, 2005	Anderson Mesa	LONEOS	·	510 m	MPC · JPL
491817	2013 AF_{1}	—	January 3, 2013	Haleakala	Pan-STARRS 1	L4	9.6 km	MPC · JPL
491818	2013 AF_{3}	—	August 30, 2011	Haleakala	Pan-STARRS 1	·	3.7 km	MPC · JPL
491819	2013 AN_{3}	—	January 3, 2013	Mount Lemmon	Mount Lemmon Survey	NYS	1.1 km	MPC · JPL
491820	2013 AK_{8}	—	March 25, 2006	Kitt Peak	Spacewatch	·	930 m	MPC · JPL
491821	2013 AZ_{8}	—	November 25, 2005	Kitt Peak	Spacewatch	·	510 m	MPC · JPL
491822	2013 AC_{16}	—	September 28, 2008	Mount Lemmon	Mount Lemmon Survey	V	700 m	MPC · JPL
491823	2013 AT_{17}	—	September 25, 2008	Kitt Peak	Spacewatch	·	770 m	MPC · JPL
491824	2013 AX_{17}	—	November 27, 2006	Kitt Peak	Spacewatch	THM	2.0 km	MPC · JPL
491825	2013 AV_{18}	—	December 9, 2012	Mount Lemmon	Mount Lemmon Survey	·	700 m	MPC · JPL
491826	2013 AD_{22}	—	July 27, 2011	Haleakala	Pan-STARRS 1	·	950 m	MPC · JPL
491827	2013 AU_{22}	—	December 9, 2012	Mount Lemmon	Mount Lemmon Survey	NYS	870 m	MPC · JPL
491828	2013 AD_{25}	—	January 5, 2013	Kitt Peak	Spacewatch	·	2.7 km	MPC · JPL
491829	2013 AN_{28}	—	December 17, 2001	Socorro	LINEAR	·	830 m	MPC · JPL
491830	2013 AS_{28}	—	November 13, 2012	Mount Lemmon	Mount Lemmon Survey	·	2.1 km	MPC · JPL
491831	2013 AN_{32}	—	August 30, 2011	Haleakala	Pan-STARRS 1	·	1.8 km	MPC · JPL
491832	2013 AP_{36}	—	September 28, 2006	Kitt Peak	Spacewatch	·	1.7 km	MPC · JPL
491833	2013 AC_{37}	—	September 19, 2011	Haleakala	Pan-STARRS 1	·	2.3 km	MPC · JPL
491834	2013 AQ_{39}	—	October 30, 2010	Mount Lemmon	Mount Lemmon Survey	L4 · ERY	7.0 km	MPC · JPL
491835	2013 AL_{40}	—	November 2, 2008	Kitt Peak	Spacewatch	·	920 m	MPC · JPL
491836	2013 AV_{44}	—	January 5, 2013	Kitt Peak	Spacewatch	NYS	1.1 km	MPC · JPL
491837	2013 AA_{45}	—	January 5, 2013	Mount Lemmon	Mount Lemmon Survey	·	810 m	MPC · JPL
491838	2013 AH_{45}	—	January 5, 2013	Kitt Peak	Spacewatch	·	3.7 km	MPC · JPL
491839	2013 AB_{46}	—	November 1, 2008	Mount Lemmon	Mount Lemmon Survey	·	810 m	MPC · JPL
491840	2013 AF_{50}	—	October 21, 2008	Mount Lemmon	Mount Lemmon Survey	·	990 m	MPC · JPL
491841	2013 AX_{51}	—	March 21, 2009	Mount Lemmon	Mount Lemmon Survey	·	1.7 km	MPC · JPL
491842	2013 AB_{53}	—	January 7, 2013	Nogales	M. Schwartz, P. R. Holvorcem	AMO +1km	790 m	MPC · JPL
491843	2013 AK_{57}	—	September 27, 2012	Haleakala	Pan-STARRS 1	·	4.1 km	MPC · JPL
491844	2013 AA_{58}	—	December 2, 2008	Kitt Peak	Spacewatch	NYS	950 m	MPC · JPL
491845	2013 AD_{67}	—	December 29, 2008	Mount Lemmon	Mount Lemmon Survey	·	1.1 km	MPC · JPL
491846	2013 AR_{67}	—	December 20, 2008	La Sagra	OAM	·	1.3 km	MPC · JPL
491847	2013 AS_{82}	—	September 28, 2003	Kitt Peak	Spacewatch	·	920 m	MPC · JPL
491848	2013 AS_{85}	—	December 6, 2005	Kitt Peak	Spacewatch	·	670 m	MPC · JPL
491849	2013 AS_{94}	—	December 7, 2012	Haleakala	Pan-STARRS 1	PHO	930 m	MPC · JPL
491850	2013 AW_{96}	—	December 11, 2012	Kitt Peak	Spacewatch	V	580 m	MPC · JPL
491851	2013 AL_{98}	—	December 23, 2012	Haleakala	Pan-STARRS 1	·	660 m	MPC · JPL
491852	2013 AD_{101}	—	December 22, 2012	Haleakala	Pan-STARRS 1	·	1.2 km	MPC · JPL
491853	2013 AH_{107}	—	January 10, 2013	Haleakala	Pan-STARRS 1	·	1.4 km	MPC · JPL
491854	2013 AW_{107}	—	January 10, 2013	Haleakala	Pan-STARRS 1	·	950 m	MPC · JPL
491855	2013 AA_{110}	—	September 16, 2003	Kitt Peak	Spacewatch	·	1.2 km	MPC · JPL
491856	2013 AB_{115}	—	November 13, 2012	Mount Lemmon	Mount Lemmon Survey	·	720 m	MPC · JPL
491857	2013 AV_{117}	—	September 4, 2011	Haleakala	Pan-STARRS 1	·	2.0 km	MPC · JPL
491858	2013 AH_{119}	—	January 15, 2004	Kitt Peak	Spacewatch	·	1.1 km	MPC · JPL
491859	2013 AM_{119}	—	December 7, 2005	Kitt Peak	Spacewatch	·	610 m	MPC · JPL
491860	2013 AA_{120}	—	July 27, 2011	Haleakala	Pan-STARRS 1	V	590 m	MPC · JPL
491861	2013 AW_{122}	—	September 4, 2008	Kitt Peak	Spacewatch	·	710 m	MPC · JPL
491862	2013 AW_{127}	—	January 6, 2013	Kitt Peak	Spacewatch	·	1.4 km	MPC · JPL
491863	2013 AW_{162}	—	October 24, 2011	Haleakala	Pan-STARRS 1	·	3.0 km	MPC · JPL
491864	2013 AF_{165}	—	November 11, 2006	Kitt Peak	Spacewatch	LIX	2.2 km	MPC · JPL
491865	2013 AD_{169}	—	April 6, 2008	Mount Lemmon	Mount Lemmon Survey	·	2.0 km	MPC · JPL
491866	2013 AX_{174}	—	May 22, 2006	Kitt Peak	Spacewatch	·	940 m	MPC · JPL
491867	2013 AY_{175}	—	October 19, 2011	Mount Lemmon	Mount Lemmon Survey	·	980 m	MPC · JPL
491868	2013 BL_{1}	—	September 28, 2009	Kitt Peak	Spacewatch	L4	6.9 km	MPC · JPL
491869	2013 BZ_{1}	—	September 20, 2008	Mount Lemmon	Mount Lemmon Survey	·	1.2 km	MPC · JPL
491870	2013 BC_{5}	—	July 28, 2011	Haleakala	Pan-STARRS 1	RAF	870 m	MPC · JPL
491871	2013 BF_{9}	—	January 26, 2006	Mount Lemmon	Mount Lemmon Survey	·	860 m	MPC · JPL
491872	2013 BK_{10}	—	January 30, 2006	Kitt Peak	Spacewatch	·	760 m	MPC · JPL
491873	2013 BG_{11}	—	January 5, 2013	Mount Lemmon	Mount Lemmon Survey	·	1.2 km	MPC · JPL
491874	2013 BD_{13}	—	April 6, 2010	Mount Lemmon	Mount Lemmon Survey	·	2.1 km	MPC · JPL
491875	2013 BC_{19}	—	January 31, 2003	Kitt Peak	Spacewatch	L4	10 km	MPC · JPL
491876	2013 BA_{21}	—	July 27, 2011	Haleakala	Pan-STARRS 1	·	870 m	MPC · JPL
491877	2013 BJ_{21}	—	September 25, 2011	Haleakala	Pan-STARRS 1	·	2.8 km	MPC · JPL
491878	2013 BT_{22}	—	December 23, 2012	Haleakala	Pan-STARRS 1	·	1.2 km	MPC · JPL
491879	2013 BJ_{31}	—	January 16, 2013	Haleakala	Pan-STARRS 1	PHO	740 m	MPC · JPL
491880	2013 BR_{36}	—	September 4, 2011	Haleakala	Pan-STARRS 1	·	2.2 km	MPC · JPL
491881	2013 BB_{40}	—	November 6, 2008	Mount Lemmon	Mount Lemmon Survey	·	750 m	MPC · JPL
491882	2013 BW_{56}	—	January 17, 2013	Haleakala	Pan-STARRS 1	L4	6.0 km	MPC · JPL
491883	2013 BP_{57}	—	January 7, 2006	Mount Lemmon	Mount Lemmon Survey	·	730 m	MPC · JPL
491884	2013 BT_{61}	—	December 21, 2008	Kitt Peak	Spacewatch	MAS	600 m	MPC · JPL
491885	2013 BR_{62}	—	February 27, 2006	Kitt Peak	Spacewatch	NYS	800 m	MPC · JPL
491886	2013 BF_{64}	—	January 18, 2013	Kitt Peak	Spacewatch	·	1.2 km	MPC · JPL
491887	2013 BE_{66}	—	February 27, 2006	Mount Lemmon	Mount Lemmon Survey	·	730 m	MPC · JPL
491888	2013 BG_{72}	—	December 1, 2006	Kitt Peak	Spacewatch	·	3.2 km	MPC · JPL
491889	2013 BM_{74}	—	November 2, 2008	Mount Lemmon	Mount Lemmon Survey	·	880 m	MPC · JPL
491890	2013 BZ_{80}	—	January 10, 2013	Haleakala	Pan-STARRS 1	·	3.1 km	MPC · JPL
491891	2013 CE_{2}	—	January 10, 2013	Haleakala	Pan-STARRS 1	·	1.1 km	MPC · JPL
491892	2013 CN_{2}	—	July 27, 2011	Haleakala	Pan-STARRS 1	·	1.7 km	MPC · JPL
491893	2013 CX_{2}	—	September 8, 2011	Haleakala	Pan-STARRS 1	·	1.1 km	MPC · JPL
491894	2013 CA_{4}	—	September 15, 2011	Haleakala	Pan-STARRS 1	DOR	1.8 km	MPC · JPL
491895	2013 CA_{14}	—	November 1, 2007	Mount Lemmon	Mount Lemmon Survey	·	1.1 km	MPC · JPL
491896	2013 CN_{14}	—	March 4, 2008	Kitt Peak	Spacewatch	EOS	1.7 km	MPC · JPL
491897	2013 CT_{14}	—	September 29, 2011	Mount Lemmon	Mount Lemmon Survey	·	1.3 km	MPC · JPL
491898	2013 CC_{15}	—	January 19, 2013	Kitt Peak	Spacewatch	NYS	870 m	MPC · JPL
491899	2013 CE_{15}	—	January 9, 2013	Kitt Peak	Spacewatch	NYS	900 m	MPC · JPL
491900	2013 CJ_{16}	—	January 6, 2013	Kitt Peak	Spacewatch	·	3.0 km	MPC · JPL

== 491901–492000 ==
back to top

Designation			Discovery			Properties		Ref
Permanent	Provisional	Named after	Date	Site	Discoverer(s)	Category	Diam.	Ref
491901	2013 CU_{16}	—	December 1, 2008	Mount Lemmon	Mount Lemmon Survey	V	720 m	MPC · JPL
491902	2013 CJ_{17}	—	February 1, 2013	Kitt Peak	Spacewatch	·	950 m	MPC · JPL
491903	2013 CA_{19}	—	March 29, 2001	Kitt Peak	Spacewatch	·	690 m	MPC · JPL
491904	2013 CY_{34}	—	December 1, 2008	Kitt Peak	Spacewatch	·	980 m	MPC · JPL
491905	2013 CJ_{42}	—	December 13, 2006	Kitt Peak	Spacewatch	·	2.2 km	MPC · JPL
491906	2013 CH_{46}	—	March 30, 2008	Kitt Peak	Spacewatch	EOS	1.3 km	MPC · JPL
491907	2013 CR_{46}	—	September 30, 2011	Kitt Peak	Spacewatch	·	700 m	MPC · JPL
491908	2013 CX_{46}	—	April 29, 2003	Kitt Peak	Spacewatch	·	930 m	MPC · JPL
491909	2013 CL_{48}	—	October 24, 2011	Mount Lemmon	Mount Lemmon Survey	·	1.1 km	MPC · JPL
491910	2013 CB_{49}	—	September 4, 2011	Haleakala	Pan-STARRS 1	·	1.6 km	MPC · JPL
491911	2013 CN_{49}	—	December 31, 2008	Kitt Peak	Spacewatch	·	1.1 km	MPC · JPL
491912	2013 CL_{53}	—	February 7, 2013	Kitt Peak	Spacewatch	·	2.3 km	MPC · JPL
491913	2013 CB_{54}	—	December 31, 2008	Kitt Peak	Spacewatch	·	1.1 km	MPC · JPL
491914	2013 CZ_{62}	—	October 18, 2011	Kitt Peak	Spacewatch	·	2.7 km	MPC · JPL
491915	2013 CW_{63}	—	February 8, 2013	Haleakala	Pan-STARRS 1	·	1.1 km	MPC · JPL
491916	2013 CG_{65}	—	August 23, 2011	Haleakala	Pan-STARRS 1	V	600 m	MPC · JPL
491917	2013 CK_{67}	—	September 18, 2011	Mount Lemmon	Mount Lemmon Survey	·	970 m	MPC · JPL
491918	2013 CT_{68}	—	September 30, 2006	Mount Lemmon	Mount Lemmon Survey	·	2.0 km	MPC · JPL
491919	2013 CL_{70}	—	August 30, 2011	Haleakala	Pan-STARRS 1	·	2.0 km	MPC · JPL
491920	2013 CS_{71}	—	January 10, 2013	Kitt Peak	Spacewatch	EUN	1.1 km	MPC · JPL
491921	2013 CX_{72}	—	September 19, 2011	Haleakala	Pan-STARRS 1	·	3.2 km	MPC · JPL
491922	2013 CL_{79}	—	September 23, 2011	Kitt Peak	Spacewatch	·	1.7 km	MPC · JPL
491923	2013 CB_{82}	—	September 2, 2010	Mount Lemmon	Mount Lemmon Survey	·	1.9 km	MPC · JPL
491924	2013 CA_{84}	—	January 30, 2009	Kitt Peak	Spacewatch	·	940 m	MPC · JPL
491925	2013 CY_{84}	—	December 23, 2012	Haleakala	Pan-STARRS 1	·	630 m	MPC · JPL
491926	2013 CV_{85}	—	August 24, 2011	Haleakala	Pan-STARRS 1	·	2.0 km	MPC · JPL
491927	2013 CO_{86}	—	February 8, 2013	Kitt Peak	Spacewatch	MAS	680 m	MPC · JPL
491928	2013 CF_{87}	—	September 23, 2011	Haleakala	Pan-STARRS 1	·	1.0 km	MPC · JPL
491929	2013 CU_{97}	—	April 21, 2006	Catalina	CSS	·	1.1 km	MPC · JPL
491930	2013 CW_{99}	—	February 8, 2013	Haleakala	Pan-STARRS 1	V	540 m	MPC · JPL
491931	2013 CM_{102}	—	April 6, 1995	Kitt Peak	Spacewatch	NYS	850 m	MPC · JPL
491932	2013 CP_{103}	—	November 24, 2008	Kitt Peak	Spacewatch	·	980 m	MPC · JPL
491933	2013 CB_{104}	—	February 9, 2013	Haleakala	Pan-STARRS 1	·	2.2 km	MPC · JPL
491934	2013 CL_{108}	—	January 12, 2002	Kitt Peak	Spacewatch	·	730 m	MPC · JPL
491935	2013 CA_{109}	—	February 6, 2013	Kitt Peak	Spacewatch	·	970 m	MPC · JPL
491936	2013 CU_{110}	—	February 9, 2013	Haleakala	Pan-STARRS 1	·	980 m	MPC · JPL
491937	2013 CJ_{112}	—	September 21, 2009	Mount Lemmon	Mount Lemmon Survey	L4 · ERY	8.4 km	MPC · JPL
491938	2013 CK_{112}	—	February 9, 2013	Haleakala	Pan-STARRS 1	·	1.1 km	MPC · JPL
491939	2013 CO_{112}	—	November 19, 2008	Kitt Peak	Spacewatch	·	610 m	MPC · JPL
491940	2013 CV_{115}	—	February 12, 2013	Haleakala	Pan-STARRS 1	·	1.0 km	MPC · JPL
491941	2013 CD_{116}	—	September 19, 2003	Kitt Peak	Spacewatch	PHO	990 m	MPC · JPL
491942	2013 CS_{118}	—	January 15, 2009	Kitt Peak	Spacewatch	MAS	590 m	MPC · JPL
491943	2013 CL_{126}	—	October 11, 2004	Kitt Peak	Spacewatch	·	910 m	MPC · JPL
491944	2013 CA_{127}	—	March 3, 2009	Mount Lemmon	Mount Lemmon Survey	·	1.5 km	MPC · JPL
491945	2013 CZ_{131}	—	January 9, 2013	Mount Lemmon	Mount Lemmon Survey	NYS	950 m	MPC · JPL
491946	2013 CC_{140}	—	March 15, 2008	Mount Lemmon	Mount Lemmon Survey	·	2.0 km	MPC · JPL
491947	2013 CL_{142}	—	March 13, 2002	Kitt Peak	Spacewatch	·	940 m	MPC · JPL
491948	2013 CE_{143}	—	December 31, 2008	Kitt Peak	Spacewatch	V	670 m	MPC · JPL
491949	2013 CT_{143}	—	February 5, 2013	Kitt Peak	Spacewatch	NYS	970 m	MPC · JPL
491950	2013 CS_{150}	—	January 9, 2013	Mount Lemmon	Mount Lemmon Survey	·	940 m	MPC · JPL
491951	2013 CE_{151}	—	February 5, 2013	Kitt Peak	Spacewatch	MAS	680 m	MPC · JPL
491952	2013 CF_{155}	—	May 21, 2006	Kitt Peak	Spacewatch	MAS	640 m	MPC · JPL
491953	2013 CQ_{157}	—	February 6, 2013	Kitt Peak	Spacewatch	·	1.1 km	MPC · JPL
491954	2013 CY_{168}	—	November 30, 2008	Kitt Peak	Spacewatch	NYS	1 km	MPC · JPL
491955	2013 CZ_{170}	—	December 1, 2008	Kitt Peak	Spacewatch	·	970 m	MPC · JPL
491956	2013 CT_{175}	—	January 25, 2009	Kitt Peak	Spacewatch	·	1.0 km	MPC · JPL
491957	2013 CD_{188}	—	October 8, 2004	Kitt Peak	Spacewatch	NYS	940 m	MPC · JPL
491958	2013 CX_{205}	—	October 24, 2011	Haleakala	Pan-STARRS 1	·	2.4 km	MPC · JPL
491959	2013 CQ_{213}	—	December 27, 2011	Mount Lemmon	Mount Lemmon Survey	L4	6.9 km	MPC · JPL
491960	2013 CV_{215}	—	June 6, 2010	WISE	WISE	·	2.4 km	MPC · JPL
491961	2013 DB_{2}	—	February 9, 2013	Haleakala	Pan-STARRS 1	PHO	830 m	MPC · JPL
491962	2013 DL_{2}	—	September 4, 2011	Haleakala	Pan-STARRS 1	V	620 m	MPC · JPL
491963	2013 DQ_{5}	—	February 1, 2013	Kitt Peak	Spacewatch	·	820 m	MPC · JPL
491964	2013 DR_{5}	—	January 17, 2013	Mount Lemmon	Mount Lemmon Survey	·	1 km	MPC · JPL
491965	2013 DS_{6}	—	September 26, 2011	Kitt Peak	Spacewatch	·	1.3 km	MPC · JPL
491966	2013 DF_{10}	—	January 20, 2013	Kitt Peak	Spacewatch	·	1.3 km	MPC · JPL
491967	2013 DP_{10}	—	January 5, 2013	Kitt Peak	Spacewatch	·	2.9 km	MPC · JPL
491968	2013 DS_{16}	—	February 3, 2009	Catalina	CSS	·	1.1 km	MPC · JPL
491969	2013 EF_{1}	—	February 10, 2013	Haleakala	Pan-STARRS 1	·	1.1 km	MPC · JPL
491970	2013 EO_{8}	—	February 15, 2013	Haleakala	Pan-STARRS 1	V	590 m	MPC · JPL
491971	2013 EP_{8}	—	February 15, 2013	Haleakala	Pan-STARRS 1	·	950 m	MPC · JPL
491972	2013 ER_{8}	—	October 25, 2011	Haleakala	Pan-STARRS 1	V	610 m	MPC · JPL
491973	2013 EN_{11}	—	March 13, 2005	Kitt Peak	Spacewatch	·	1.5 km	MPC · JPL
491974	2013 EZ_{12}	—	October 15, 2007	Catalina	CSS	·	1.3 km	MPC · JPL
491975	2013 EU_{14}	—	October 25, 2011	Haleakala	Pan-STARRS 1	V	680 m	MPC · JPL
491976	2013 EF_{16}	—	February 7, 2013	Kitt Peak	Spacewatch	·	960 m	MPC · JPL
491977	2013 EK_{17}	—	March 18, 2002	Kitt Peak	Spacewatch	MAS	640 m	MPC · JPL
491978	2013 EE_{19}	—	March 5, 2013	Mount Lemmon	Mount Lemmon Survey	·	820 m	MPC · JPL
491979	2013 EG_{21}	—	September 28, 2011	Mount Lemmon	Mount Lemmon Survey	·	900 m	MPC · JPL
491980	2013 EY_{29}	—	March 6, 2013	Haleakala	Pan-STARRS 1	·	980 m	MPC · JPL
491981	2013 EG_{31}	—	January 16, 2009	Kitt Peak	Spacewatch	·	1.1 km	MPC · JPL
491982	2013 ER_{32}	—	February 22, 2010	WISE	WISE	PHO	1.2 km	MPC · JPL
491983	2013 EU_{34}	—	March 5, 2013	Kitt Peak	Spacewatch	NYS	1.1 km	MPC · JPL
491984 Brunapontes	2013 EG_{44}	Brunapontes	November 24, 2011	Haleakala	Pan-STARRS 1	·	3.2 km	MPC · JPL
491985	2013 EX_{44}	—	October 24, 2011	Mount Lemmon	Mount Lemmon Survey	·	1.3 km	MPC · JPL
491986	2013 EG_{49}	—	January 1, 2009	Mount Lemmon	Mount Lemmon Survey	·	1.1 km	MPC · JPL
491987	2013 EH_{58}	—	March 8, 2013	Haleakala	Pan-STARRS 1	·	1.1 km	MPC · JPL
491988	2013 EL_{58}	—	March 3, 2009	Kitt Peak	Spacewatch	·	670 m	MPC · JPL
491989	2013 EK_{61}	—	January 15, 2005	Kitt Peak	Spacewatch	·	1.1 km	MPC · JPL
491990	2013 ED_{66}	—	February 21, 2013	Haleakala	Pan-STARRS 1	·	1.0 km	MPC · JPL
491991	2013 EM_{67}	—	May 20, 2005	Mount Lemmon	Mount Lemmon Survey	·	1.1 km	MPC · JPL
491992	2013 EJ_{72}	—	September 23, 2011	Haleakala	Pan-STARRS 1	·	920 m	MPC · JPL
491993	2013 EG_{82}	—	January 17, 2009	Kitt Peak	Spacewatch	NYS	1.1 km	MPC · JPL
491994	2013 EC_{89}	—	September 15, 2007	Mount Lemmon	Mount Lemmon Survey	L4	6.9 km	MPC · JPL
491995	2013 EY_{97}	—	March 8, 2013	Haleakala	Pan-STARRS 1	NYS	960 m	MPC · JPL
491996	2013 EX_{101}	—	March 11, 2013	Kitt Peak	Spacewatch	EUN	1.1 km	MPC · JPL
491997	2013 ED_{105}	—	February 27, 2006	Kitt Peak	Spacewatch	V	500 m	MPC · JPL
491998	2013 EM_{107}	—	March 26, 2009	Kitt Peak	Spacewatch	·	1.4 km	MPC · JPL
491999	2013 EQ_{107}	—	March 13, 2013	Mount Lemmon	Mount Lemmon Survey	·	1.1 km	MPC · JPL
492000	2013 EJ_{109}	—	September 17, 2006	Kitt Peak	Spacewatch	·	1.2 km	MPC · JPL

back to top

== Meaning of names ==
As minor planet discoveries are confirmed, they are given a permanent number by the IAU's Minor Planet Center (MPC), and the discoverers can then submit names for them, following the IAU's naming conventions. The list below concerns those minor planets in the specified number-range that have received names, and explains the meanings of those names.

Official naming citations of newly named small Solar System bodies are approved and published in a bulletin by IAU's Working Group for Small Bodies Nomenclature (WGSBN). Before May 2021, citations were published in MPC's Minor Planet Circulars for many decades. Recent citations can also be found on the JPL Small-Body Database (SBDB). Until his death in 2016, German astronomer Lutz D. Schmadel compiled these citations into the Dictionary of Minor Planet Names (DMP) and regularly updated the collection.

Based on Paul Herget's The Names of the Minor Planets, Schmadel also researched the unclear origin of numerous asteroids, most of which had been named prior to World War II. This article incorporates text from this source, which is in the public domain: SBDB New namings may only be added to this list below after official publication as the preannouncement of names is condemned. The WGSBN publishes a comprehensive guideline for the naming rules of non-cometary small Solar System bodies.

Named minor planet	Provisional	This minor planet was named for...	Ref · Catalog
491984 Brunapontes	2013 EG_{44}	Bruna Pontes (born 2006) is a student at Escola Municipal Morangaba in Campos dos Goytacazes, Brazil. She participates in the International Astronomical Search Collaboration, and has made many asteroid observations and discoveries.	IAU · 491984
