= List of minor planets: 439001–440000 =

The following is a partial list of minor planets, running from minor-planet number 439001 through 440000, inclusive. The primary data for this and other partial lists is based on JPL's "Small-Body Orbital Elements" and data available from the Minor Planet Center. Critical list information is also provided by the MPC, unless otherwise specified from Lowell Observatory. A detailed description of the table's columns and additional sources are given on the main page including a complete list of every page in this series, and a statistical break-up on the dynamical classification of minor planets.

Also see the summary list of all named bodies in numerical and alphabetical order, and the corresponding naming citations for the number range of this particular list. New namings may only be added to this list after official publication, as the preannouncement of names is condemned by the Working Group for Small Bodies Nomenclature of the International Astronomical Union.

Near-Earth obj.	MBA (inner)	MBA (outer)	Centaur
Mars-crosser	MBA (middle)	Jupiter trojan	Trans-Neptunian obj.
Unclassified

== 439001–439100 ==
Designation			Discovery			Properties		Ref
Permanent	Provisional	Named after	Date	Site	Discoverer(s)	Category	Diam.	Ref
439001	2010 VE_{82}	—	September 15, 2004	Siding Spring	SSS	·	3.3 km	MPC · JPL
439002	2010 VX_{104}	—	November 5, 2010	Mount Lemmon	Mount Lemmon Survey	L4	8.7 km	MPC · JPL
439003	2010 VV_{138}	—	November 23, 1998	Kitt Peak	Spacewatch	L4	8.0 km	MPC · JPL
439004	2010 VJ_{204}	—	September 16, 2010	Mount Lemmon	Mount Lemmon Survey	EOS	2.2 km	MPC · JPL
439005	2010 WK_{62}	—	November 30, 2003	Kitt Peak	Spacewatch	SYL · CYB	4.4 km	MPC · JPL
439006	2010 WL_{71}	—	October 16, 2007	Catalina	CSS	H	720 m	MPC · JPL
439007	2010 XV_{69}	—	November 19, 2003	Catalina	CSS	·	710 m	MPC · JPL
439008	2010 YN_{3}	—	December 19, 2004	Socorro	LINEAR	·	3.6 km	MPC · JPL
439009	2011 AT_{22}	—	January 10, 2011	Mount Lemmon	Mount Lemmon Survey	·	930 m	MPC · JPL
439010	2011 AH_{30}	—	March 6, 2008	Mount Lemmon	Mount Lemmon Survey	·	680 m	MPC · JPL
439011	2011 AH_{49}	—	February 28, 2008	Mount Lemmon	Mount Lemmon Survey	·	590 m	MPC · JPL
439012	2011 AN_{50}	—	March 18, 2005	Catalina	CSS	·	790 m	MPC · JPL
439013	2011 AT_{59}	—	April 28, 2008	Kitt Peak	Spacewatch	·	510 m	MPC · JPL
439014	2011 BW_{6}	—	March 9, 2005	Kitt Peak	Spacewatch	·	680 m	MPC · JPL
439015	2011 BA_{20}	—	December 10, 2010	Mount Lemmon	Mount Lemmon Survey	·	960 m	MPC · JPL
439016	2011 BA_{63}	—	January 2, 2011	Mount Lemmon	Mount Lemmon Survey	·	850 m	MPC · JPL
439017	2011 CT_{9}	—	January 11, 2011	Kitt Peak	Spacewatch	·	2.3 km	MPC · JPL
439018	2011 DE_{22}	—	April 20, 2004	Socorro	LINEAR	·	1.0 km	MPC · JPL
439019	2011 DY_{23}	—	February 26, 2011	Kitt Peak	Spacewatch	·	900 m	MPC · JPL
439020	2011 DG_{32}	—	January 2, 2011	Mount Lemmon	Mount Lemmon Survey	·	920 m	MPC · JPL
439021	2011 DQ_{36}	—	March 30, 2008	Kitt Peak	Spacewatch	·	680 m	MPC · JPL
439022	2011 DL_{40}	—	March 11, 2000	Socorro	LINEAR	·	1.0 km	MPC · JPL
439023	2011 DY_{42}	—	April 22, 2004	Kitt Peak	Spacewatch	·	890 m	MPC · JPL
439024	2011 EF	—	June 2, 2008	Mount Lemmon	Mount Lemmon Survey	·	730 m	MPC · JPL
439025	2011 EM_{15}	—	October 7, 2005	Mount Lemmon	Mount Lemmon Survey	·	1.1 km	MPC · JPL
439026	2011 ER_{20}	—	February 5, 2011	Catalina	CSS	·	990 m	MPC · JPL
439027	2011 EB_{22}	—	November 18, 2006	Kitt Peak	Spacewatch	·	680 m	MPC · JPL
439028	2011 EQ_{39}	—	December 13, 2006	Kitt Peak	Spacewatch	·	770 m	MPC · JPL
439029	2011 EZ_{76}	—	February 28, 2000	Socorro	LINEAR	·	1.1 km	MPC · JPL
439030	2011 EF_{85}	—	March 13, 2011	Kitt Peak	Spacewatch	V	680 m	MPC · JPL
439031	2011 FS_{3}	—	March 20, 2004	Socorro	LINEAR	·	850 m	MPC · JPL
439032	2011 FC_{7}	—	October 27, 2006	Mount Lemmon	Mount Lemmon Survey	·	760 m	MPC · JPL
439033	2011 FF_{8}	—	February 16, 2007	Catalina	CSS	·	1.1 km	MPC · JPL
439034	2011 FP_{11}	—	March 25, 2011	Kitt Peak	Spacewatch	·	820 m	MPC · JPL
439035	2011 FK_{17}	—	October 1, 2005	Kitt Peak	Spacewatch	·	1.2 km	MPC · JPL
439036	2011 FY_{40}	—	September 3, 2008	Kitt Peak	Spacewatch	EUN	1.3 km	MPC · JPL
439037	2011 FQ_{44}	—	March 13, 2011	Kitt Peak	Spacewatch	NYS	1.1 km	MPC · JPL
439038	2011 FE_{57}	—	May 19, 2004	Kitt Peak	Spacewatch	NYS	970 m	MPC · JPL
439039	2011 FQ_{68}	—	February 8, 2007	Mount Lemmon	Mount Lemmon Survey	·	1.2 km	MPC · JPL
439040	2011 FQ_{81}	—	June 8, 1997	Kitt Peak	Spacewatch	V	520 m	MPC · JPL
439041	2011 FX_{81}	—	March 5, 2011	Kitt Peak	Spacewatch	MAS	710 m	MPC · JPL
439042	2011 FC_{88}	—	January 26, 2007	Kitt Peak	Spacewatch	·	1.1 km	MPC · JPL
439043	2011 FT_{120}	—	March 14, 2011	Mount Lemmon	Mount Lemmon Survey	·	930 m	MPC · JPL
439044	2011 FV_{130}	—	November 22, 2009	Kitt Peak	Spacewatch	·	780 m	MPC · JPL
439045	2011 FN_{132}	—	February 25, 2011	Mount Lemmon	Mount Lemmon Survey	·	680 m	MPC · JPL
439046	2011 FH_{142}	—	March 27, 2011	Mount Lemmon	Mount Lemmon Survey	·	1.3 km	MPC · JPL
439047	2011 FA_{157}	—	February 26, 2007	Mount Lemmon	Mount Lemmon Survey	·	2.0 km	MPC · JPL
439048	2011 GG_{4}	—	April 23, 2004	Campo Imperatore	CINEOS	NYS	910 m	MPC · JPL
439049	2011 GP_{37}	—	November 16, 2009	Mount Lemmon	Mount Lemmon Survey	·	730 m	MPC · JPL
439050	2011 GW_{56}	—	October 22, 2005	Catalina	CSS	·	890 m	MPC · JPL
439051	2011 GU_{71}	—	November 4, 2005	Kitt Peak	Spacewatch	·	1.5 km	MPC · JPL
439052	2011 GY_{75}	—	February 9, 2007	Mount Lemmon	Mount Lemmon Survey	·	670 m	MPC · JPL
439053	2011 HB_{6}	—	April 23, 2011	Catalina	CSS	·	1.7 km	MPC · JPL
439054	2011 HO_{6}	—	March 4, 2011	Mount Lemmon	Mount Lemmon Survey	PHO	1.0 km	MPC · JPL
439055	2011 HP_{7}	—	March 14, 2011	Kitt Peak	Spacewatch	·	910 m	MPC · JPL
439056	2011 HO_{16}	—	April 4, 2011	Kitt Peak	Spacewatch	·	670 m	MPC · JPL
439057	2011 HA_{18}	—	November 19, 2006	Kitt Peak	Spacewatch	·	630 m	MPC · JPL
439058	2011 HR_{29}	—	March 28, 2011	Kitt Peak	Spacewatch	·	700 m	MPC · JPL
439059	2011 HB_{41}	—	April 26, 2011	Kitt Peak	Spacewatch	·	1.8 km	MPC · JPL
439060	2011 HE_{55}	—	March 10, 2007	Mount Lemmon	Mount Lemmon Survey	V	630 m	MPC · JPL
439061	2011 HN_{66}	—	May 10, 2007	Mount Lemmon	Mount Lemmon Survey	·	1.1 km	MPC · JPL
439062	2011 HR_{67}	—	February 23, 2007	Kitt Peak	Spacewatch	·	760 m	MPC · JPL
439063	2011 HD_{74}	—	April 27, 2011	Kitt Peak	Spacewatch	·	1.4 km	MPC · JPL
439064	2011 HP_{74}	—	March 13, 2007	Kitt Peak	Spacewatch	·	1.0 km	MPC · JPL
439065	2011 HM_{89}	—	May 13, 2004	Kitt Peak	Spacewatch	·	710 m	MPC · JPL
439066	2011 HQ_{91}	—	November 4, 2005	Kitt Peak	Spacewatch	·	870 m	MPC · JPL
439067	2011 HR_{101}	—	September 20, 2001	Socorro	LINEAR	·	770 m	MPC · JPL
439068	2011 JM_{9}	—	April 24, 2011	Catalina	CSS	PHO	930 m	MPC · JPL
439069	2011 JU_{11}	—	September 5, 2008	Kitt Peak	Spacewatch	·	1.2 km	MPC · JPL
439070	2011 JV_{17}	—	January 27, 2006	Mount Lemmon	Mount Lemmon Survey	·	1.4 km	MPC · JPL
439071	2011 JU_{29}	—	September 29, 2008	Catalina	CSS	·	1.2 km	MPC · JPL
439072	2011 KM_{2}	—	October 6, 2008	Mount Lemmon	Mount Lemmon Survey	·	1.2 km	MPC · JPL
439073	2011 KR_{11}	—	April 1, 2010	WISE	WISE	EUN	2.3 km	MPC · JPL
439074	2011 KK_{22}	—	May 23, 2011	Kitt Peak	Spacewatch	·	1.1 km	MPC · JPL
439075	2011 KZ_{28}	—	November 30, 2008	Kitt Peak	Spacewatch	·	1.4 km	MPC · JPL
439076	2011 KQ_{44}	—	May 21, 2011	Mount Lemmon	Mount Lemmon Survey	·	1.3 km	MPC · JPL
439077	2011 LB_{14}	—	June 4, 2011	Mount Lemmon	Mount Lemmon Survey	(5)	1.4 km	MPC · JPL
439078	2011 NU_{1}	—	October 6, 2002	Socorro	LINEAR	·	2.6 km	MPC · JPL
439079	2011 NC_{3}	—	February 25, 2006	Kitt Peak	Spacewatch	·	1.2 km	MPC · JPL
439080	2011 OV_{1}	—	September 18, 2003	Kitt Peak	Spacewatch	RAF	860 m	MPC · JPL
439081	2011 ON_{35}	—	June 22, 2011	Mount Lemmon	Mount Lemmon Survey	·	1.1 km	MPC · JPL
439082	2011 OS_{49}	—	December 30, 2008	Kitt Peak	Spacewatch	·	1.9 km	MPC · JPL
439083	2011 OC_{55}	—	August 8, 2007	Socorro	LINEAR	·	1.4 km	MPC · JPL
439084	2011 PO_{2}	—	September 28, 2003	Kitt Peak	Spacewatch	·	1.4 km	MPC · JPL
439085	2011 PN_{12}	—	July 28, 2011	Siding Spring	SSS	GEF	1.2 km	MPC · JPL
439086	2011 QP_{5}	—	May 5, 2006	Siding Spring	SSS	·	2.3 km	MPC · JPL
439087	2011 QZ_{10}	—	July 24, 2000	Kitt Peak	Spacewatch	EOS	1.7 km	MPC · JPL
439088	2011 QB_{16}	—	April 10, 2010	Mount Lemmon	Mount Lemmon Survey	·	2.2 km	MPC · JPL
439089	2011 QN_{28}	—	October 9, 2007	Catalina	CSS	·	2.1 km	MPC · JPL
439090	2011 QP_{39}	—	November 11, 1999	Kitt Peak	Spacewatch	(5)	960 m	MPC · JPL
439091	2011 QV_{46}	—	April 7, 2005	Mount Lemmon	Mount Lemmon Survey	BRA	1.9 km	MPC · JPL
439092	2011 QP_{59}	—	September 10, 2007	Mount Lemmon	Mount Lemmon Survey	·	1.0 km	MPC · JPL
439093	2011 QF_{94}	—	November 20, 2007	Mount Lemmon	Mount Lemmon Survey	GEF	1.5 km	MPC · JPL
439094	2011 RV_{12}	—	August 27, 2001	Kitt Peak	Spacewatch	·	2.6 km	MPC · JPL
439095	2011 ST_{6}	—	September 14, 2006	Kitt Peak	Spacewatch	·	1.8 km	MPC · JPL
439096	2011 SH_{11}	—	April 9, 2010	WISE	WISE	·	3.4 km	MPC · JPL
439097	2011 SF_{12}	—	August 22, 2007	Kitt Peak	Spacewatch	(1547)	1.9 km	MPC · JPL
439098	2011 SV_{15}	—	October 9, 2007	Catalina	CSS	·	1.5 km	MPC · JPL
439099	2011 SM_{24}	—	September 21, 2011	Kitt Peak	Spacewatch	·	2.6 km	MPC · JPL
439100	2011 SN_{30}	—	January 19, 1999	Kitt Peak	Spacewatch	·	1.8 km	MPC · JPL

== 439101–439200 ==
back to top

Designation			Discovery			Properties		Ref
Permanent	Provisional	Named after	Date	Site	Discoverer(s)	Category	Diam.	Ref
439101	2011 SW_{56}	—	August 27, 2006	Kitt Peak	Spacewatch	·	1.8 km	MPC · JPL
439102	2011 SJ_{59}	—	October 21, 2007	Kitt Peak	Spacewatch	·	1.9 km	MPC · JPL
439103	2011 SQ_{63}	—	October 14, 2007	Catalina	CSS	·	1.3 km	MPC · JPL
439104	2011 SY_{66}	—	September 14, 2007	Mount Lemmon	Mount Lemmon Survey	·	1.6 km	MPC · JPL
439105	2011 SZ_{66}	—	November 6, 2007	Kitt Peak	Spacewatch	·	1.3 km	MPC · JPL
439106	2011 SN_{67}	—	December 19, 2007	Kitt Peak	Spacewatch	·	1.4 km	MPC · JPL
439107	2011 SZ_{67}	—	September 26, 1998	Socorro	LINEAR	·	1.7 km	MPC · JPL
439108	2011 SL_{69}	—	April 17, 2010	WISE	WISE	·	3.3 km	MPC · JPL
439109	2011 SB_{75}	—	January 11, 2008	Kitt Peak	Spacewatch	VER	2.8 km	MPC · JPL
439110	2011 SH_{78}	—	November 2, 2007	Mount Lemmon	Mount Lemmon Survey	·	2.0 km	MPC · JPL
439111	2011 SA_{89}	—	September 13, 2005	Kitt Peak	Spacewatch	·	3.2 km	MPC · JPL
439112	2011 SL_{89}	—	September 22, 2011	Kitt Peak	Spacewatch	HOF	2.8 km	MPC · JPL
439113	2011 SM_{96}	—	November 3, 2007	Kitt Peak	Spacewatch	NEM	1.9 km	MPC · JPL
439114	2011 SN_{96}	—	May 9, 2010	Mount Lemmon	Mount Lemmon Survey	·	1.5 km	MPC · JPL
439115	2011 SF_{103}	—	July 3, 2005	Mount Lemmon	Mount Lemmon Survey	TEL	1.8 km	MPC · JPL
439116	2011 SK_{108}	—	January 16, 2009	Kitt Peak	Spacewatch	·	1.9 km	MPC · JPL
439117	2011 SN_{109}	—	September 11, 2007	Kitt Peak	Spacewatch	MAR	1.4 km	MPC · JPL
439118	2011 SS_{112}	—	September 20, 2011	Kitt Peak	Spacewatch	AEO	1.2 km	MPC · JPL
439119	2011 SA_{114}	—	November 2, 2007	Kitt Peak	Spacewatch	MIS	2.3 km	MPC · JPL
439120	2011 ST_{120}	—	November 3, 2007	Mount Lemmon	Mount Lemmon Survey	·	2.5 km	MPC · JPL
439121	2011 SD_{148}	—	October 21, 2006	Mount Lemmon	Mount Lemmon Survey	·	2.2 km	MPC · JPL
439122	2011 SH_{152}	—	February 7, 2008	Kitt Peak	Spacewatch	HYG	2.7 km	MPC · JPL
439123	2011 SS_{156}	—	February 22, 2009	Kitt Peak	Spacewatch	·	1.9 km	MPC · JPL
439124	2011 SB_{157}	—	April 2, 2005	Mount Lemmon	Mount Lemmon Survey	·	1.8 km	MPC · JPL
439125	2011 SA_{159}	—	March 11, 2005	Mount Lemmon	Mount Lemmon Survey	·	2.1 km	MPC · JPL
439126	2011 SU_{192}	—	September 25, 2006	Mount Lemmon	Mount Lemmon Survey	·	1.9 km	MPC · JPL
439127	2011 SO_{196}	—	September 18, 2011	Mount Lemmon	Mount Lemmon Survey	·	2.3 km	MPC · JPL
439128	2011 SK_{222}	—	April 11, 2010	WISE	WISE	·	3.0 km	MPC · JPL
439129	2011 SG_{225}	—	October 23, 2006	Mount Lemmon	Mount Lemmon Survey	·	3.3 km	MPC · JPL
439130	2011 ST_{234}	—	March 10, 2005	Mount Lemmon	Mount Lemmon Survey	·	2.4 km	MPC · JPL
439131	2011 SE_{246}	—	December 18, 2007	Kitt Peak	Spacewatch	(1547)	1.6 km	MPC · JPL
439132	2011 ST_{251}	—	April 13, 2004	Kitt Peak	Spacewatch	EOS	1.6 km	MPC · JPL
439133	2011 SY_{262}	—	January 15, 2004	Kitt Peak	Spacewatch	AST	1.6 km	MPC · JPL
439134	2011 TV_{8}	—	October 6, 2011	Mount Lemmon	Mount Lemmon Survey	·	3.3 km	MPC · JPL
439135	2011 TZ_{8}	—	December 21, 2006	Kitt Peak	Spacewatch	·	3.2 km	MPC · JPL
439136	2011 TA_{12}	—	March 31, 2009	Kitt Peak	Spacewatch	·	4.2 km	MPC · JPL
439137	2011 TP_{12}	—	January 11, 2008	Kitt Peak	Spacewatch	·	1.4 km	MPC · JPL
439138	2011 TA_{15}	—	May 22, 2006	Kitt Peak	Spacewatch	·	1.4 km	MPC · JPL
439139	2011 UK_{2}	—	October 1, 2011	Kitt Peak	Spacewatch	·	1.8 km	MPC · JPL
439140	2011 UP_{3}	—	October 1, 2000	Socorro	LINEAR	·	3.0 km	MPC · JPL
439141	2011 UR_{27}	—	December 11, 2006	Kitt Peak	Spacewatch	THM	2.5 km	MPC · JPL
439142	2011 UV_{28}	—	November 27, 2000	Kitt Peak	Spacewatch	·	3.5 km	MPC · JPL
439143	2011 UX_{47}	—	October 6, 2011	Mount Lemmon	Mount Lemmon Survey	·	2.5 km	MPC · JPL
439144	2011 UM_{78}	—	October 17, 2006	Kitt Peak	Spacewatch	NAE	2.1 km	MPC · JPL
439145	2011 UK_{101}	—	April 5, 2008	Mount Lemmon	Mount Lemmon Survey	·	2.4 km	MPC · JPL
439146	2011 UA_{108}	—	December 31, 1999	Kitt Peak	Spacewatch	·	1.4 km	MPC · JPL
439147	2011 UH_{113}	—	October 1, 2000	Socorro	LINEAR	·	2.7 km	MPC · JPL
439148	2011 UZ_{120}	—	November 13, 2007	Mount Lemmon	Mount Lemmon Survey	·	2.6 km	MPC · JPL
439149	2011 UN_{147}	—	June 24, 2010	WISE	WISE	·	1.3 km	MPC · JPL
439150	2011 UG_{163}	—	July 4, 2010	Mount Lemmon	Mount Lemmon Survey	·	3.1 km	MPC · JPL
439151	2011 UP_{186}	—	January 18, 2008	Kitt Peak	Spacewatch	·	1.5 km	MPC · JPL
439152	2011 US_{211}	—	February 1, 2009	Mount Lemmon	Mount Lemmon Survey	·	2.2 km	MPC · JPL
439153	2011 UM_{225}	—	September 28, 2006	Kitt Peak	Spacewatch	KOR	1.4 km	MPC · JPL
439154	2011 UK_{235}	—	February 13, 2008	Mount Lemmon	Mount Lemmon Survey	·	3.8 km	MPC · JPL
439155	2011 UO_{248}	—	April 8, 2010	WISE	WISE	·	2.5 km	MPC · JPL
439156	2011 UU_{251}	—	October 22, 2011	Kitt Peak	Spacewatch	·	1.7 km	MPC · JPL
439157	2011 UR_{254}	—	April 21, 2009	Mount Lemmon	Mount Lemmon Survey	EOS	2.0 km	MPC · JPL
439158	2011 UX_{263}	—	December 22, 2006	Socorro	LINEAR	·	4.0 km	MPC · JPL
439159	2011 UF_{267}	—	November 5, 1994	Kitt Peak	Spacewatch	·	3.3 km	MPC · JPL
439160	2011 UV_{285}	—	February 24, 2009	Kitt Peak	Spacewatch	KOR	1.4 km	MPC · JPL
439161	2011 US_{288}	—	May 13, 2009	Mount Lemmon	Mount Lemmon Survey	·	4.0 km	MPC · JPL
439162	2011 UD_{298}	—	October 23, 2006	Mount Lemmon	Mount Lemmon Survey	EOS	1.9 km	MPC · JPL
439163	2011 UB_{318}	—	May 19, 2010	Mount Lemmon	Mount Lemmon Survey	·	2.1 km	MPC · JPL
439164	2011 UG_{336}	—	September 24, 2011	Catalina	CSS	·	2.1 km	MPC · JPL
439165	2011 UC_{343}	—	April 16, 2010	WISE	WISE	·	4.3 km	MPC · JPL
439166	2011 UH_{386}	—	December 5, 2002	Socorro	LINEAR	·	1.5 km	MPC · JPL
439167	2011 UH_{388}	—	November 17, 2006	Kitt Peak	Spacewatch	·	3.3 km	MPC · JPL
439168	2011 UE_{392}	—	October 27, 2011	Mount Lemmon	Mount Lemmon Survey	·	2.6 km	MPC · JPL
439169	2011 UQ_{404}	—	January 17, 2010	WISE	WISE	·	2.3 km	MPC · JPL
439170	2011 VP_{2}	—	April 27, 2009	Kitt Peak	Spacewatch	·	2.8 km	MPC · JPL
439171	2011 VZ_{2}	—	July 7, 2010	WISE	WISE	·	3.4 km	MPC · JPL
439172	2011 VX_{9}	—	May 18, 2010	WISE	WISE	·	3.0 km	MPC · JPL
439173	2011 VW_{17}	—	January 17, 2007	Kitt Peak	Spacewatch	THM	2.2 km	MPC · JPL
439174	2011 WA_{15}	—	November 4, 2010	Mount Lemmon	Mount Lemmon Survey	·	4.3 km	MPC · JPL
439175	2011 WS_{33}	—	November 19, 2006	Kitt Peak	Spacewatch	·	1.8 km	MPC · JPL
439176	2011 WD_{38}	—	May 12, 2010	WISE	WISE	·	2.9 km	MPC · JPL
439177	2011 WY_{49}	—	September 5, 2010	Mount Lemmon	Mount Lemmon Survey	·	3.3 km	MPC · JPL
439178	2011 WR_{55}	—	May 8, 2005	Kitt Peak	Spacewatch	·	1.9 km	MPC · JPL
439179	2011 WU_{62}	—	June 12, 2010	WISE	WISE	·	5.7 km	MPC · JPL
439180	2011 WA_{63}	—	December 11, 2006	Kitt Peak	Spacewatch	·	3.2 km	MPC · JPL
439181	2011 WB_{90}	—	June 18, 2010	WISE	WISE	·	4.0 km	MPC · JPL
439182	2011 WF_{90}	—	August 20, 2004	Catalina	CSS	·	4.3 km	MPC · JPL
439183	2011 WU_{93}	—	October 30, 2011	Kitt Peak	Spacewatch	·	1.7 km	MPC · JPL
439184	2011 WM_{113}	—	March 19, 2009	Kitt Peak	Spacewatch	EOS	1.7 km	MPC · JPL
439185	2011 WY_{113}	—	October 5, 2000	Socorro	LINEAR	·	3.5 km	MPC · JPL
439186	2011 WZ_{122}	—	October 21, 2011	Mount Lemmon	Mount Lemmon Survey	·	3.3 km	MPC · JPL
439187	2011 WG_{136}	—	November 26, 2011	Mount Lemmon	Mount Lemmon Survey	·	2.6 km	MPC · JPL
439188	2011 WK_{144}	—	July 5, 2005	Siding Spring	SSS	·	2.3 km	MPC · JPL
439189	2011 YX_{2}	—	October 31, 2005	Catalina	CSS	·	3.7 km	MPC · JPL
439190	2011 YR_{17}	—	October 1, 2005	Catalina	CSS	·	2.5 km	MPC · JPL
439191	2011 YK_{29}	—	December 21, 2005	Catalina	CSS	T_{j} (2.98)	4.7 km	MPC · JPL
439192	2012 AZ_{1}	—	June 7, 2010	WISE	WISE	·	3.1 km	MPC · JPL
439193	2012 AF_{5}	—	October 22, 2011	Mount Lemmon	Mount Lemmon Survey	·	3.2 km	MPC · JPL
439194	2012 BD_{9}	—	October 13, 2010	Mount Lemmon	Mount Lemmon Survey	(45637) · CYB	4.2 km	MPC · JPL
439195	2012 BS_{9}	—	November 30, 2010	Catalina	CSS	·	4.2 km	MPC · JPL
439196	2012 BT_{14}	—	December 24, 2005	Socorro	LINEAR	·	3.8 km	MPC · JPL
439197	2012 BS_{34}	—	December 24, 2011	Mount Lemmon	Mount Lemmon Survey	L4	10 km	MPC · JPL
439198	2012 BE_{98}	—	January 19, 2001	Socorro	LINEAR	·	3.7 km	MPC · JPL
439199	2012 BD_{121}	—	September 14, 2009	Kitt Peak	Spacewatch	CYB	4.1 km	MPC · JPL
439200	2012 BB_{131}	—	April 19, 2007	Catalina	CSS	H	690 m	MPC · JPL

== 439201–439300 ==
back to top

Designation			Discovery			Properties		Ref
Permanent	Provisional	Named after	Date	Site	Discoverer(s)	Category	Diam.	Ref
439201	2012 BL_{134}	—	January 28, 2007	Kitt Peak	Spacewatch	H	510 m	MPC · JPL
439202	2012 DC_{54}	—	January 23, 2012	Catalina	CSS	H	520 m	MPC · JPL
439203	2012 MO_{11}	—	April 25, 2008	Mount Lemmon	Mount Lemmon Survey	PHO	2.2 km	MPC · JPL
439204	2012 RR_{13}	—	December 24, 2005	Kitt Peak	Spacewatch	MAS	750 m	MPC · JPL
439205	2012 RD_{18}	—	February 17, 2004	Kitt Peak	Spacewatch	·	830 m	MPC · JPL
439206	2012 RE_{23}	—	December 11, 2004	Kitt Peak	Spacewatch	·	1.4 km	MPC · JPL
439207	2012 RK_{23}	—	November 9, 1999	Socorro	LINEAR	·	1.6 km	MPC · JPL
439208	2012 RQ_{25}	—	February 23, 2007	Mount Lemmon	Mount Lemmon Survey	·	1.3 km	MPC · JPL
439209	2012 SS_{5}	—	November 30, 2003	Kitt Peak	Spacewatch	·	2.0 km	MPC · JPL
439210	2012 SQ_{12}	—	October 25, 2005	Kitt Peak	Spacewatch	·	720 m	MPC · JPL
439211	2012 SQ_{14}	—	April 13, 2011	Mount Lemmon	Mount Lemmon Survey	·	780 m	MPC · JPL
439212	2012 SU_{14}	—	September 17, 2012	Kitt Peak	Spacewatch	·	1.1 km	MPC · JPL
439213	2012 ST_{17}	—	September 25, 2005	Kitt Peak	Spacewatch	·	990 m	MPC · JPL
439214	2012 SK_{27}	—	February 15, 2010	Mount Lemmon	Mount Lemmon Survey	·	1.2 km	MPC · JPL
439215	2012 SE_{63}	—	October 7, 2005	Catalina	CSS	·	890 m	MPC · JPL
439216	2012 TW_{13}	—	September 17, 2012	Kitt Peak	Spacewatch	PHO	1.0 km	MPC · JPL
439217	2012 TE_{17}	—	October 16, 2001	Kitt Peak	Spacewatch	V	470 m	MPC · JPL
439218	2012 TK_{17}	—	May 3, 1994	Kitt Peak	Spacewatch	·	670 m	MPC · JPL
439219	2012 TY_{34}	—	October 1, 2005	Mount Lemmon	Mount Lemmon Survey	·	1 km	MPC · JPL
439220	2012 TZ_{34}	—	December 15, 2009	Mount Lemmon	Mount Lemmon Survey	·	770 m	MPC · JPL
439221	2012 TK_{36}	—	March 19, 2010	Kitt Peak	Spacewatch	·	1.9 km	MPC · JPL
439222	2012 TZ_{40}	—	August 29, 2005	Kitt Peak	Spacewatch	(2076)	690 m	MPC · JPL
439223	2012 TG_{41}	—	November 20, 2008	Mount Lemmon	Mount Lemmon Survey	·	1.6 km	MPC · JPL
439224	2012 TA_{56}	—	September 30, 2005	Mount Lemmon	Mount Lemmon Survey	·	940 m	MPC · JPL
439225	2012 TK_{64}	—	December 3, 2008	Socorro	LINEAR	·	1.7 km	MPC · JPL
439226	2012 TF_{66}	—	October 23, 2008	Mount Lemmon	Mount Lemmon Survey	·	1.3 km	MPC · JPL
439227	2012 TN_{70}	—	September 25, 2005	Kitt Peak	Spacewatch	·	740 m	MPC · JPL
439228	2012 TQ_{95}	—	September 17, 2012	Kitt Peak	Spacewatch	·	1.7 km	MPC · JPL
439229	2012 TD_{97}	—	April 26, 2006	Kitt Peak	Spacewatch	·	1.5 km	MPC · JPL
439230	2012 TN_{100}	—	April 18, 2007	Mount Lemmon	Mount Lemmon Survey	·	1.4 km	MPC · JPL
439231	2012 TS_{114}	—	April 7, 2005	Kitt Peak	Spacewatch	·	2.4 km	MPC · JPL
439232	2012 TD_{122}	—	December 21, 2005	Kitt Peak	Spacewatch	·	1.5 km	MPC · JPL
439233	2012 TQ_{129}	—	April 24, 2008	Mount Lemmon	Mount Lemmon Survey	·	660 m	MPC · JPL
439234	2012 TG_{132}	—	October 9, 2012	Mount Lemmon	Mount Lemmon Survey	WIT	1.1 km	MPC · JPL
439235	2012 TV_{133}	—	January 14, 2010	Kitt Peak	Spacewatch	·	720 m	MPC · JPL
439236	2012 TV_{134}	—	August 27, 2001	Kitt Peak	Spacewatch	·	760 m	MPC · JPL
439237	2012 TC_{135}	—	March 27, 2011	Mount Lemmon	Mount Lemmon Survey	·	850 m	MPC · JPL
439238	2012 TW_{144}	—	November 5, 2005	Kitt Peak	Spacewatch	·	930 m	MPC · JPL
439239	2012 TX_{166}	—	September 13, 1999	Kitt Peak	Spacewatch	·	730 m	MPC · JPL
439240	2012 TJ_{169}	—	January 17, 2005	Kitt Peak	Spacewatch	·	1.7 km	MPC · JPL
439241	2012 TH_{173}	—	October 9, 2012	Mount Lemmon	Mount Lemmon Survey	AGN	980 m	MPC · JPL
439242	2012 TP_{191}	—	December 24, 2005	Kitt Peak	Spacewatch	NYS	1.3 km	MPC · JPL
439243	2012 TS_{191}	—	October 18, 2003	Kitt Peak	Spacewatch	·	2.0 km	MPC · JPL
439244	2012 TO_{195}	—	October 10, 2008	Mount Lemmon	Mount Lemmon Survey	·	1.1 km	MPC · JPL
439245	2012 TF_{201}	—	April 19, 2004	Kitt Peak	Spacewatch	·	840 m	MPC · JPL
439246	2012 TY_{242}	—	April 6, 2005	Kitt Peak	Spacewatch	·	1.9 km	MPC · JPL
439247	2012 TD_{252}	—	September 29, 2008	Mount Lemmon	Mount Lemmon Survey	·	1.8 km	MPC · JPL
439248	2012 TA_{258}	—	June 5, 2002	Kitt Peak	Spacewatch	·	610 m	MPC · JPL
439249	2012 TZ_{264}	—	September 29, 2008	Kitt Peak	Spacewatch	MAR	780 m	MPC · JPL
439250	2012 TS_{265}	—	November 21, 2008	Kitt Peak	Spacewatch	·	1.6 km	MPC · JPL
439251	2012 TR_{274}	—	November 22, 2008	Kitt Peak	Spacewatch	·	1.5 km	MPC · JPL
439252	2012 TE_{276}	—	October 17, 2003	Kitt Peak	Spacewatch	·	1.7 km	MPC · JPL
439253	2012 TT_{282}	—	April 15, 2010	Mount Lemmon	Mount Lemmon Survey	·	1.6 km	MPC · JPL
439254	2012 TN_{284}	—	April 29, 2008	Mount Lemmon	Mount Lemmon Survey	·	700 m	MPC · JPL
439255	2012 TD_{286}	—	November 10, 2004	Kitt Peak	Spacewatch	(5)	990 m	MPC · JPL
439256	2012 TG_{291}	—	December 1, 2005	Kitt Peak	Spacewatch	·	1.2 km	MPC · JPL
439257	2012 TL_{297}	—	April 7, 2006	Catalina	CSS	·	2.3 km	MPC · JPL
439258	2012 TV_{308}	—	September 17, 2012	Kitt Peak	Spacewatch	·	1.3 km	MPC · JPL
439259	2012 TX_{308}	—	April 8, 2008	Kitt Peak	Spacewatch	·	720 m	MPC · JPL
439260	2012 TC_{309}	—	October 18, 2003	Kitt Peak	Spacewatch	·	2.6 km	MPC · JPL
439261	2012 TR_{310}	—	January 23, 2006	Mount Lemmon	Mount Lemmon Survey	·	1.4 km	MPC · JPL
439262	2012 TW_{310}	—	March 16, 2010	Mount Lemmon	Mount Lemmon Survey	RAF	1.1 km	MPC · JPL
439263	2012 TT_{313}	—	June 14, 2010	WISE	WISE	·	2.5 km	MPC · JPL
439264	2012 TA_{314}	—	January 27, 2006	Mount Lemmon	Mount Lemmon Survey	MAS	730 m	MPC · JPL
439265	2012 UU_{3}	—	May 8, 2005	Mount Lemmon	Mount Lemmon Survey	·	560 m	MPC · JPL
439266	2012 UB_{5}	—	April 10, 2008	Kitt Peak	Spacewatch	·	690 m	MPC · JPL
439267	2012 UX_{7}	—	October 27, 2008	Mount Lemmon	Mount Lemmon Survey	·	1.4 km	MPC · JPL
439268	2012 UE_{8}	—	May 4, 2005	Mount Lemmon	Mount Lemmon Survey	·	520 m	MPC · JPL
439269	2012 UF_{10}	—	November 25, 2005	Kitt Peak	Spacewatch	·	1.2 km	MPC · JPL
439270	2012 UG_{19}	—	April 12, 2010	Mount Lemmon	Mount Lemmon Survey	·	2.1 km	MPC · JPL
439271	2012 UR_{28}	—	November 11, 2009	Kitt Peak	Spacewatch	·	640 m	MPC · JPL
439272	2012 UW_{30}	—	November 26, 2005	Kitt Peak	Spacewatch	·	900 m	MPC · JPL
439273	2012 UY_{37}	—	September 14, 2012	Catalina	CSS	·	1.5 km	MPC · JPL
439274	2012 UU_{38}	—	November 20, 2001	Kitt Peak	Spacewatch	·	1.2 km	MPC · JPL
439275	2012 UY_{38}	—	February 21, 2006	Kitt Peak	Spacewatch	·	1.3 km	MPC · JPL
439276	2012 UB_{42}	—	May 7, 2005	Kitt Peak	Spacewatch	·	590 m	MPC · JPL
439277	2012 UH_{47}	—	September 23, 2008	Mount Lemmon	Mount Lemmon Survey	·	1.2 km	MPC · JPL
439278	2012 UH_{64}	—	October 20, 2012	Mount Lemmon	Mount Lemmon Survey	·	1.4 km	MPC · JPL
439279	2012 UG_{65}	—	December 1, 2005	Kitt Peak	Spacewatch	V	590 m	MPC · JPL
439280	2012 UP_{65}	—	October 20, 2012	Kitt Peak	Spacewatch	(5)	1.3 km	MPC · JPL
439281	2012 UR_{68}	—	October 25, 2005	Kitt Peak	Spacewatch	·	850 m	MPC · JPL
439282	2012 UG_{70}	—	October 6, 2005	Mount Lemmon	Mount Lemmon Survey	·	690 m	MPC · JPL
439283	2012 UQ_{77}	—	May 13, 2010	WISE	WISE	·	4.3 km	MPC · JPL
439284	2012 UJ_{85}	—	April 24, 2011	Mount Lemmon	Mount Lemmon Survey	·	1.2 km	MPC · JPL
439285	2012 UN_{90}	—	November 19, 2008	Kitt Peak	Spacewatch	·	1.4 km	MPC · JPL
439286	2012 UJ_{100}	—	April 27, 2000	Kitt Peak	Spacewatch	·	1.3 km	MPC · JPL
439287	2012 UP_{112}	—	February 16, 2010	Kitt Peak	Spacewatch	MAR	1.3 km	MPC · JPL
439288	2012 US_{132}	—	October 7, 1999	Socorro	LINEAR	·	1.8 km	MPC · JPL
439289	2012 UF_{139}	—	March 4, 2006	Catalina	CSS	ADE	2.2 km	MPC · JPL
439290	2012 UB_{140}	—	October 10, 2012	Mount Lemmon	Mount Lemmon Survey	·	2.5 km	MPC · JPL
439291	2012 UJ_{145}	—	September 28, 2009	Kitt Peak	Spacewatch	·	1.0 km	MPC · JPL
439292	2012 UK_{151}	—	December 5, 2008	Mount Lemmon	Mount Lemmon Survey	·	1.5 km	MPC · JPL
439293	2012 UQ_{160}	—	May 28, 2008	Mount Lemmon	Mount Lemmon Survey	·	1.0 km	MPC · JPL
439294	2012 UG_{164}	—	August 10, 2007	Kitt Peak	Spacewatch	·	1.6 km	MPC · JPL
439295	2012 UC_{168}	—	October 7, 2008	Mount Lemmon	Mount Lemmon Survey	·	2.3 km	MPC · JPL
439296	2012 UZ_{168}	—	October 5, 2005	Catalina	CSS	·	890 m	MPC · JPL
439297	2012 VG_{12}	—	March 15, 2007	Mount Lemmon	Mount Lemmon Survey	PHO	3.6 km	MPC · JPL
439298	2012 VL_{17}	—	June 6, 2010	WISE	WISE	·	5.7 km	MPC · JPL
439299	2012 VH_{18}	—	December 1, 2008	Kitt Peak	Spacewatch	(5)	1.2 km	MPC · JPL
439300	2012 VD_{21}	—	December 22, 2008	Kitt Peak	Spacewatch	·	1.7 km	MPC · JPL

== 439301–439400 ==
back to top

Designation			Discovery			Properties		Ref
Permanent	Provisional	Named after	Date	Site	Discoverer(s)	Category	Diam.	Ref
439301	2012 VV_{26}	—	September 4, 2008	Kitt Peak	Spacewatch	SUL	2.0 km	MPC · JPL
439302	2012 VZ_{30}	—	January 23, 2006	Kitt Peak	Spacewatch	·	1.7 km	MPC · JPL
439303	2012 VJ_{34}	—	March 18, 2010	Mount Lemmon	Mount Lemmon Survey	·	1.6 km	MPC · JPL
439304	2012 VV_{35}	—	October 10, 2007	Catalina	CSS	GEF	1.9 km	MPC · JPL
439305	2012 VD_{42}	—	November 5, 2007	Kitt Peak	Spacewatch	·	2.3 km	MPC · JPL
439306	2012 VA_{47}	—	September 23, 2008	Kitt Peak	Spacewatch	·	1.1 km	MPC · JPL
439307	2012 VG_{58}	—	December 2, 2008	Mount Lemmon	Mount Lemmon Survey	·	1.9 km	MPC · JPL
439308	2012 VS_{58}	—	November 30, 2008	Mount Lemmon	Mount Lemmon Survey	·	890 m	MPC · JPL
439309	2012 VC_{64}	—	May 28, 2008	Mount Lemmon	Mount Lemmon Survey	·	700 m	MPC · JPL
439310	2012 VH_{65}	—	March 21, 2010	Mount Lemmon	Mount Lemmon Survey	·	1.9 km	MPC · JPL
439311	2012 VB_{75}	—	September 18, 2007	Kitt Peak	Spacewatch	·	1.6 km	MPC · JPL
439312	2012 VH_{80}	—	October 20, 2006	Kitt Peak	Spacewatch	·	2.5 km	MPC · JPL
439313	2012 VE_{82}	—	November 12, 2012	Haleakala	Pan-STARRS 1	APO · PHA	420 m	MPC · JPL
439314	2012 VG_{85}	—	April 14, 2007	Kitt Peak	Spacewatch	·	1.2 km	MPC · JPL
439315	2012 VL_{87}	—	September 23, 2008	Kitt Peak	Spacewatch	CLA	1.5 km	MPC · JPL
439316	2012 VB_{91}	—	October 19, 2003	Kitt Peak	Spacewatch	·	1.9 km	MPC · JPL
439317	2012 VE_{92}	—	November 4, 2012	Kitt Peak	Spacewatch	·	2.4 km	MPC · JPL
439318	2012 VS_{93}	—	November 7, 2007	Mount Lemmon	Mount Lemmon Survey	·	2.9 km	MPC · JPL
439319	2012 VG_{101}	—	August 23, 2007	Kitt Peak	Spacewatch	PAD	1.5 km	MPC · JPL
439320	2012 VM_{102}	—	April 19, 2006	Mount Lemmon	Mount Lemmon Survey	·	1.6 km	MPC · JPL
439321	2012 VA_{107}	—	September 20, 2003	Kitt Peak	Spacewatch	·	1.3 km	MPC · JPL
439322	2012 VL_{107}	—	September 21, 2008	Catalina	CSS	·	1.2 km	MPC · JPL
439323	2012 VW_{107}	—	January 12, 2008	Mount Lemmon	Mount Lemmon Survey	·	3.2 km	MPC · JPL
439324	2012 VO_{109}	—	November 1, 2008	Mount Lemmon	Mount Lemmon Survey	·	1.4 km	MPC · JPL
439325	2012 WY_{2}	—	November 10, 2005	Mount Lemmon	Mount Lemmon Survey	·	940 m	MPC · JPL
439326	2012 WS_{6}	—	April 15, 2007	Kitt Peak	Spacewatch	·	1.2 km	MPC · JPL
439327	2012 WE_{9}	—	November 22, 2008	Kitt Peak	Spacewatch	·	1.5 km	MPC · JPL
439328	2012 WA_{16}	—	October 11, 2004	Kitt Peak	Spacewatch	·	1.3 km	MPC · JPL
439329	2012 WQ_{16}	—	November 19, 2003	Kitt Peak	Spacewatch	·	2.0 km	MPC · JPL
439330	2012 WR_{16}	—	November 22, 2012	Kitt Peak	Spacewatch	GEF	1.2 km	MPC · JPL
439331	2012 WU_{16}	—	October 23, 2006	Catalina	CSS	·	4.6 km	MPC · JPL
439332	2012 WE_{22}	—	November 30, 2003	Kitt Peak	Spacewatch	·	1.8 km	MPC · JPL
439333	2012 WH_{25}	—	November 3, 2007	Kitt Peak	Spacewatch	EOS	1.7 km	MPC · JPL
439334	2012 WS_{27}	—	December 25, 2005	Mount Lemmon	Mount Lemmon Survey	·	920 m	MPC · JPL
439335	2012 WM_{35}	—	September 15, 2007	Mount Lemmon	Mount Lemmon Survey	·	2.3 km	MPC · JPL
439336	2012 WP_{35}	—	December 3, 2007	Kitt Peak	Spacewatch	·	2.7 km	MPC · JPL
439337	2012 XM	—	November 29, 2005	Kitt Peak	Spacewatch	·	1.1 km	MPC · JPL
439338	2012 XU_{7}	—	November 16, 2001	Kitt Peak	Spacewatch	·	5.1 km	MPC · JPL
439339	2012 XB_{9}	—	October 23, 2012	Mount Lemmon	Mount Lemmon Survey	·	3.4 km	MPC · JPL
439340	2012 XE_{9}	—	October 28, 2008	Mount Lemmon	Mount Lemmon Survey	·	1.5 km	MPC · JPL
439341	2012 XM_{12}	—	January 30, 2008	Mount Lemmon	Mount Lemmon Survey	·	2.2 km	MPC · JPL
439342	2012 XY_{12}	—	September 29, 1973	Palomar	C. J. van Houten, I. van Houten-Groeneveld, T. Gehrels	·	950 m	MPC · JPL
439343	2012 XD_{19}	—	December 26, 2005	Kitt Peak	Spacewatch	·	930 m	MPC · JPL
439344	2012 XE_{20}	—	May 30, 1997	Kitt Peak	Spacewatch	GEF	1.7 km	MPC · JPL
439345	2012 XD_{22}	—	November 7, 2012	Kitt Peak	Spacewatch	EUN	1.5 km	MPC · JPL
439346	2012 XS_{28}	—	December 4, 2007	Mount Lemmon	Mount Lemmon Survey	·	2.2 km	MPC · JPL
439347	2012 XR_{32}	—	October 7, 2008	Mount Lemmon	Mount Lemmon Survey	·	1.3 km	MPC · JPL
439348	2012 XS_{41}	—	December 3, 2012	Mount Lemmon	Mount Lemmon Survey	·	2.1 km	MPC · JPL
439349	2012 XR_{57}	—	October 23, 2003	Kitt Peak	Spacewatch	·	2.2 km	MPC · JPL
439350	2012 XB_{61}	—	December 4, 2012	Mount Lemmon	Mount Lemmon Survey	·	2.0 km	MPC · JPL
439351	2012 XN_{63}	—	March 28, 2009	Catalina	CSS	EOS	2.3 km	MPC · JPL
439352	2012 XU_{82}	—	May 13, 2010	Mount Lemmon	Mount Lemmon Survey	·	2.5 km	MPC · JPL
439353	2012 XU_{84}	—	June 6, 2011	Mount Lemmon	Mount Lemmon Survey	·	1.3 km	MPC · JPL
439354	2012 XM_{95}	—	March 16, 2010	Mount Lemmon	Mount Lemmon Survey	·	1.6 km	MPC · JPL
439355	2012 XT_{116}	—	October 19, 2006	Mount Lemmon	Mount Lemmon Survey	·	3.0 km	MPC · JPL
439356	2012 XY_{122}	—	March 16, 2010	Catalina	CSS	·	1.5 km	MPC · JPL
439357	2012 XC_{124}	—	June 5, 2011	Mount Lemmon	Mount Lemmon Survey	·	1.1 km	MPC · JPL
439358	2012 XH_{135}	—	December 4, 2007	Mount Lemmon	Mount Lemmon Survey	·	2.6 km	MPC · JPL
439359	2012 XQ_{135}	—	October 1, 2008	Catalina	CSS	·	1.4 km	MPC · JPL
439360	2012 XY_{137}	—	November 25, 2012	Kitt Peak	Spacewatch	EOS	2.2 km	MPC · JPL
439361	2012 XO_{138}	—	December 28, 2005	Kitt Peak	Spacewatch	·	900 m	MPC · JPL
439362	2012 XW_{153}	—	November 26, 2012	Mount Lemmon	Mount Lemmon Survey	·	3.0 km	MPC · JPL
439363	2012 XY_{154}	—	October 13, 2004	Socorro	LINEAR	·	1.4 km	MPC · JPL
439364	2012 YP_{8}	—	November 20, 2006	Siding Spring	SSS	·	4.4 km	MPC · JPL
439365	2012 YB_{9}	—	January 7, 2000	Kitt Peak	Spacewatch	SYL · CYB	5.5 km	MPC · JPL
439366	2013 AR_{1}	—	January 14, 2010	WISE	WISE	·	2.7 km	MPC · JPL
439367	2013 AW_{4}	—	February 12, 2008	Mount Lemmon	Mount Lemmon Survey	·	2.6 km	MPC · JPL
439368	2013 AU_{7}	—	July 3, 2005	Mount Lemmon	Mount Lemmon Survey	EOS	2.0 km	MPC · JPL
439369	2013 AP_{8}	—	March 15, 2004	Kitt Peak	Spacewatch	·	2.0 km	MPC · JPL
439370	2013 AA_{9}	—	November 19, 2006	Catalina	CSS	·	3.1 km	MPC · JPL
439371	2013 AV_{9}	—	December 13, 2012	Mount Lemmon	Mount Lemmon Survey	KOR	1.5 km	MPC · JPL
439372	2013 AL_{10}	—	November 16, 2006	Catalina	CSS	·	2.4 km	MPC · JPL
439373	2013 AS_{12}	—	May 8, 2010	WISE	WISE	·	2.8 km	MPC · JPL
439374	2013 AO_{25}	—	April 6, 2010	Mount Lemmon	Mount Lemmon Survey	·	1.2 km	MPC · JPL
439375	2013 AS_{25}	—	November 25, 2006	Mount Lemmon	Mount Lemmon Survey	·	3.6 km	MPC · JPL
439376	2013 AZ_{63}	—	April 12, 2008	Catalina	CSS	·	3.5 km	MPC · JPL
439377	2013 AQ_{69}	—	September 13, 2005	Kitt Peak	Spacewatch	EOS	2.1 km	MPC · JPL
439378	2013 AE_{74}	—	October 19, 2007	Catalina	CSS	(5)	1.5 km	MPC · JPL
439379	2013 AO_{78}	—	February 16, 2004	Kitt Peak	Spacewatch	·	2.0 km	MPC · JPL
439380	2013 AK_{83}	—	March 12, 2002	Kitt Peak	Spacewatch	·	1.6 km	MPC · JPL
439381	2013 AP_{91}	—	October 9, 2007	Kitt Peak	Spacewatch	WIT	970 m	MPC · JPL
439382	2013 AV_{91}	—	January 4, 2013	Kitt Peak	Spacewatch	·	2.2 km	MPC · JPL
439383	2013 AV_{93}	—	July 9, 2005	Kitt Peak	Spacewatch	·	2.6 km	MPC · JPL
439384	2013 AP_{96}	—	January 27, 2000	Kitt Peak	Spacewatch	·	2.0 km	MPC · JPL
439385	2013 AJ_{109}	—	April 29, 2009	Mount Lemmon	Mount Lemmon Survey	·	3.2 km	MPC · JPL
439386	2013 AB_{110}	—	February 29, 2008	Siding Spring	SSS	·	5.4 km	MPC · JPL
439387	2013 AO_{112}	—	January 9, 2002	Socorro	LINEAR	·	1.3 km	MPC · JPL
439388	2013 AE_{118}	—	February 8, 2008	Catalina	CSS	·	3.9 km	MPC · JPL
439389	2013 AM_{118}	—	March 1, 2008	Mount Lemmon	Mount Lemmon Survey	·	3.3 km	MPC · JPL
439390	2013 AF_{124}	—	February 25, 2006	Kitt Peak	Spacewatch	V	700 m	MPC · JPL
439391	2013 AU_{129}	—	August 31, 2011	Siding Spring	SSS	·	2.3 km	MPC · JPL
439392	2013 AX_{129}	—	November 21, 2007	Mount Lemmon	Mount Lemmon Survey	·	1.9 km	MPC · JPL
439393	2013 AN_{130}	—	November 1, 2007	Kitt Peak	Spacewatch	·	2.0 km	MPC · JPL
439394	2013 AZ_{130}	—	November 12, 2007	Mount Lemmon	Mount Lemmon Survey	·	3.4 km	MPC · JPL
439395	2013 AZ_{150}	—	September 30, 1997	Kitt Peak	Spacewatch	L4	7.7 km	MPC · JPL
439396	2013 AY_{165}	—	October 17, 2011	Kitt Peak	Spacewatch	·	2.3 km	MPC · JPL
439397	2013 AL_{166}	—	February 8, 2008	Kitt Peak	Spacewatch	·	1.9 km	MPC · JPL
439398	2013 BO_{11}	—	September 26, 2006	Mount Lemmon	Mount Lemmon Survey	·	1.7 km	MPC · JPL
439399	2013 BC_{14}	—	December 5, 2007	Catalina	CSS	·	4.8 km	MPC · JPL
439400	2013 BZ_{29}	—	December 17, 2003	Kitt Peak	Spacewatch	·	1.8 km	MPC · JPL

== 439401–439500 ==
back to top

Designation			Discovery			Properties		Ref
Permanent	Provisional	Named after	Date	Site	Discoverer(s)	Category	Diam.	Ref
439401	2013 BT_{40}	—	December 16, 2006	Kitt Peak	Spacewatch	·	3.3 km	MPC · JPL
439402	2013 BA_{46}	—	December 8, 2010	Catalina	CSS	L4	10 km	MPC · JPL
439403	2013 BE_{46}	—	December 2, 2005	Mount Lemmon	Mount Lemmon Survey	CYB	4.1 km	MPC · JPL
439404	2013 BQ_{56}	—	December 31, 2007	Mount Lemmon	Mount Lemmon Survey	·	1.9 km	MPC · JPL
439405	2013 BQ_{66}	—	January 20, 2013	Kitt Peak	Spacewatch	KOR	1.3 km	MPC · JPL
439406	2013 BV_{69}	—	September 24, 2006	Kitt Peak	Spacewatch	KOR	1.3 km	MPC · JPL
439407	2013 BG_{76}	—	October 19, 2007	Catalina	CSS	·	1.6 km	MPC · JPL
439408	2013 CF_{17}	—	February 1, 2013	Kitt Peak	Spacewatch	·	3.1 km	MPC · JPL
439409	2013 CL_{20}	—	December 31, 2007	Mount Lemmon	Mount Lemmon Survey	·	2.0 km	MPC · JPL
439410	2013 CU_{30}	—	February 18, 2008	Mount Lemmon	Mount Lemmon Survey	·	3.1 km	MPC · JPL
439411	2013 CD_{43}	—	June 19, 2010	WISE	WISE	·	3.1 km	MPC · JPL
439412	2013 CE_{55}	—	March 11, 2008	Mount Lemmon	Mount Lemmon Survey	·	3.6 km	MPC · JPL
439413	2013 CY_{63}	—	February 28, 2008	Kitt Peak	Spacewatch	·	3.0 km	MPC · JPL
439414	2013 CM_{66}	—	February 28, 2008	Kitt Peak	Spacewatch	·	2.8 km	MPC · JPL
439415	2013 CO_{71}	—	August 25, 2004	Kitt Peak	Spacewatch	·	3.1 km	MPC · JPL
439416	2013 CB_{76}	—	April 2, 2009	Mount Lemmon	Mount Lemmon Survey	·	2.0 km	MPC · JPL
439417	2013 CN_{86}	—	February 4, 2000	Kitt Peak	Spacewatch	·	1.3 km	MPC · JPL
439418	2013 CP_{101}	—	February 29, 2008	Kitt Peak	Spacewatch	·	2.9 km	MPC · JPL
439419	2013 CZ_{110}	—	January 20, 2013	Kitt Peak	Spacewatch	·	2.9 km	MPC · JPL
439420	2013 CZ_{150}	—	February 14, 2013	Kitt Peak	Spacewatch	·	2.3 km	MPC · JPL
439421	2013 CD_{202}	—	January 11, 2008	Mount Lemmon	Mount Lemmon Survey	·	1.8 km	MPC · JPL
439422	2013 DA_{12}	—	October 22, 2005	Kitt Peak	Spacewatch	·	3.7 km	MPC · JPL
439423	2013 DT_{13}	—	October 1, 2005	Anderson Mesa	LONEOS	·	4.3 km	MPC · JPL
439424	2013 EP_{1}	—	August 18, 2006	Kitt Peak	Spacewatch	WIT	1.2 km	MPC · JPL
439425	2013 EJ_{6}	—	October 28, 2005	Kitt Peak	Spacewatch	·	2.4 km	MPC · JPL
439426	2013 EL_{12}	—	March 9, 2007	Mount Lemmon	Mount Lemmon Survey	·	4.6 km	MPC · JPL
439427	2013 EL_{60}	—	September 26, 2005	Kitt Peak	Spacewatch	KOR	1.8 km	MPC · JPL
439428	2013 EG_{77}	—	July 18, 2010	WISE	WISE	CYB	3.1 km	MPC · JPL
439429	2013 FS_{17}	—	September 17, 2004	Kitt Peak	Spacewatch	·	3.4 km	MPC · JPL
439430	2013 FD_{21}	—	October 5, 2004	Kitt Peak	Spacewatch	·	2.9 km	MPC · JPL
439431	2013 GG_{1}	—	March 31, 2008	Mount Lemmon	Mount Lemmon Survey	·	4.2 km	MPC · JPL
439432	2013 GF_{14}	—	February 6, 1995	Kitt Peak	Spacewatch	·	4.6 km	MPC · JPL
439433	2013 GM_{17}	—	February 17, 2007	Catalina	CSS	·	2.8 km	MPC · JPL
439434	2013 GE_{37}	—	May 8, 2005	Kitt Peak	Spacewatch	(5)	1.3 km	MPC · JPL
439435	2013 GR_{84}	—	December 27, 2005	Kitt Peak	Spacewatch	·	4.0 km	MPC · JPL
439436	2013 HK_{12}	—	January 7, 2006	Mount Lemmon	Mount Lemmon Survey	·	4.1 km	MPC · JPL
439437	2013 NK_{4}	—	July 1, 2013	Siding Spring	SSS	APO · PHA	580 m	MPC · JPL
439438	2013 PP_{73}	—	December 30, 2008	Catalina	CSS	H	600 m	MPC · JPL
439439	2013 TJ_{81}	—	April 20, 2010	Mount Lemmon	Mount Lemmon Survey	H	340 m	MPC · JPL
439440	2013 UO	—	June 6, 2002	Socorro	LINEAR	H	630 m	MPC · JPL
439441	2013 UV_{1}	—	January 2, 2009	Catalina	CSS	H	610 m	MPC · JPL
439442	2013 VR_{16}	—	September 15, 2013	Mount Lemmon	Mount Lemmon Survey	·	2.6 km	MPC · JPL
439443	2013 WX_{3}	—	November 21, 2000	Socorro	LINEAR	·	2.0 km	MPC · JPL
439444	2013 WV_{24}	—	December 22, 2008	Kitt Peak	Spacewatch	H	690 m	MPC · JPL
439445	2013 WF_{44}	—	March 26, 2010	WISE	WISE	·	3.7 km	MPC · JPL
439446	2013 WP_{81}	—	January 30, 2009	Catalina	CSS	·	2.5 km	MPC · JPL
439447	2013 XQ_{4}	—	October 1, 2006	Kitt Peak	Spacewatch	·	670 m	MPC · JPL
439448	2013 XT_{18}	—	April 16, 2004	Kitt Peak	Spacewatch	·	940 m	MPC · JPL
439449	2013 XS_{20}	—	September 24, 2009	Mount Lemmon	Mount Lemmon Survey	·	1.5 km	MPC · JPL
439450	2013 XN_{23}	—	December 13, 2013	Mount Lemmon	Mount Lemmon Survey	·	1.8 km	MPC · JPL
439451	2013 XK_{25}	—	October 21, 2006	Mount Lemmon	Mount Lemmon Survey	·	750 m	MPC · JPL
439452	2013 YB_{3}	—	December 30, 2000	Socorro	LINEAR	·	2.6 km	MPC · JPL
439453	2013 YD_{5}	—	December 4, 2008	Mount Lemmon	Mount Lemmon Survey	·	2.1 km	MPC · JPL
439454	2013 YO_{8}	—	February 9, 2005	Mount Lemmon	Mount Lemmon Survey	·	2.0 km	MPC · JPL
439455	2013 YF_{16}	—	October 21, 2009	Mount Lemmon	Mount Lemmon Survey	·	670 m	MPC · JPL
439456	2013 YH_{18}	—	December 25, 2013	Kitt Peak	Spacewatch	·	1.8 km	MPC · JPL
439457	2013 YK_{28}	—	February 22, 2007	Kitt Peak	Spacewatch	·	1.0 km	MPC · JPL
439458	2013 YE_{31}	—	January 8, 2002	Palomar	NEAT	·	2.5 km	MPC · JPL
439459	2013 YT_{34}	—	April 2, 2006	Kitt Peak	Spacewatch	·	1.4 km	MPC · JPL
439460	2013 YZ_{34}	—	January 23, 2006	Catalina	CSS	MAR	1.3 km	MPC · JPL
439461	2013 YP_{35}	—	April 17, 2007	Catalina	CSS	·	2.0 km	MPC · JPL
439462	2013 YX_{42}	—	January 15, 2010	WISE	WISE	BRA	2.4 km	MPC · JPL
439463	2013 YO_{44}	—	October 12, 2009	Mount Lemmon	Mount Lemmon Survey	·	960 m	MPC · JPL
439464	2013 YM_{45}	—	January 4, 2010	Kitt Peak	Spacewatch	·	1.5 km	MPC · JPL
439465	2013 YW_{47}	—	December 29, 2008	Mount Lemmon	Mount Lemmon Survey	·	3.0 km	MPC · JPL
439466	2013 YT_{54}	—	July 28, 2008	Catalina	CSS	PHO	1.8 km	MPC · JPL
439467	2013 YW_{54}	—	August 12, 2012	Kitt Peak	Spacewatch	·	2.1 km	MPC · JPL
439468	2013 YD_{61}	—	December 20, 2009	Mount Lemmon	Mount Lemmon Survey	·	1.4 km	MPC · JPL
439469	2013 YF_{64}	—	November 18, 2009	Kitt Peak	Spacewatch	V	710 m	MPC · JPL
439470	2013 YM_{64}	—	October 1, 2003	Kitt Peak	Spacewatch	·	2.0 km	MPC · JPL
439471	2013 YE_{73}	—	November 18, 2006	Mount Lemmon	Mount Lemmon Survey	·	700 m	MPC · JPL
439472	2013 YJ_{74}	—	October 26, 2009	Mount Lemmon	Mount Lemmon Survey	·	1.4 km	MPC · JPL
439473	2013 YF_{83}	—	October 20, 2008	Kitt Peak	Spacewatch	·	1.8 km	MPC · JPL
439474	2013 YO_{84}	—	October 15, 2012	Mount Lemmon	Mount Lemmon Survey	·	1.5 km	MPC · JPL
439475	2013 YZ_{86}	—	October 31, 2013	Mount Lemmon	Mount Lemmon Survey	·	3.5 km	MPC · JPL
439476	2013 YM_{90}	—	March 11, 2007	Mount Lemmon	Mount Lemmon Survey	·	1.2 km	MPC · JPL
439477	2013 YO_{90}	—	May 23, 2011	Mount Lemmon	Mount Lemmon Survey	·	1.1 km	MPC · JPL
439478	2013 YW_{92}	—	November 4, 2004	Kitt Peak	Spacewatch	·	1.6 km	MPC · JPL
439479	2013 YA_{93}	—	November 22, 2006	Mount Lemmon	Mount Lemmon Survey	·	940 m	MPC · JPL
439480	2013 YF_{94}	—	October 6, 2000	Kitt Peak	Spacewatch	·	880 m	MPC · JPL
439481	2013 YJ_{95}	—	November 17, 2009	Mount Lemmon	Mount Lemmon Survey	·	1.1 km	MPC · JPL
439482	2013 YT_{105}	—	November 9, 2007	Mount Lemmon	Mount Lemmon Survey	·	3.0 km	MPC · JPL
439483	2013 YN_{111}	—	September 17, 2010	Socorro	LINEAR	H	580 m	MPC · JPL
439484	2013 YZ_{111}	—	January 6, 2005	Socorro	LINEAR	·	1.7 km	MPC · JPL
439485	2013 YS_{113}	—	December 22, 2008	Kitt Peak	Spacewatch	·	1.6 km	MPC · JPL
439486	2013 YX_{113}	—	September 27, 2006	Kitt Peak	Spacewatch	·	590 m	MPC · JPL
439487	2013 YN_{115}	—	August 18, 2006	Kitt Peak	Spacewatch	·	620 m	MPC · JPL
439488	2013 YB_{116}	—	January 28, 2006	Kitt Peak	Spacewatch	·	1.1 km	MPC · JPL
439489	2013 YZ_{123}	—	June 9, 2011	Mount Lemmon	Mount Lemmon Survey	·	1.2 km	MPC · JPL
439490	2013 YW_{125}	—	September 27, 2008	Mount Lemmon	Mount Lemmon Survey	·	1.2 km	MPC · JPL
439491	2013 YW_{147}	—	October 28, 2008	Mount Lemmon	Mount Lemmon Survey	·	2.6 km	MPC · JPL
439492	2013 YY_{147}	—	December 27, 2006	Mount Lemmon	Mount Lemmon Survey	NYS	1.1 km	MPC · JPL
439493	2013 YU_{149}	—	December 20, 2009	Kitt Peak	Spacewatch	·	1.1 km	MPC · JPL
439494	2014 AR_{8}	—	February 22, 2003	Anderson Mesa	LONEOS	NYS	1.1 km	MPC · JPL
439495	2014 AS_{11}	—	April 11, 2010	WISE	WISE	·	1.1 km	MPC · JPL
439496	2014 AL_{14}	—	September 26, 2006	Socorro	LINEAR	·	700 m	MPC · JPL
439497	2014 AD_{18}	—	April 25, 2006	Kitt Peak	Spacewatch	·	1.5 km	MPC · JPL
439498	2014 AN_{19}	—	August 29, 2006	Kitt Peak	Spacewatch	·	2.5 km	MPC · JPL
439499	2014 AK_{28}	—	October 19, 2012	Mount Lemmon	Mount Lemmon Survey	·	2.9 km	MPC · JPL
439500	2014 AX_{37}	—	March 27, 2008	Kitt Peak	Spacewatch	·	770 m	MPC · JPL

== 439501–439600 ==
back to top

Designation			Discovery			Properties		Ref
Permanent	Provisional	Named after	Date	Site	Discoverer(s)	Category	Diam.	Ref
439501	2014 AR_{42}	—	October 26, 2008	Mount Lemmon	Mount Lemmon Survey	·	1.9 km	MPC · JPL
439502	2014 AB_{46}	—	January 21, 2006	Siding Spring	SSS	·	2.1 km	MPC · JPL
439503	2014 AA_{48}	—	January 17, 2005	Socorro	LINEAR	NEM	2.5 km	MPC · JPL
439504	2014 AV_{53}	—	December 20, 2004	Mount Lemmon	Mount Lemmon Survey	·	1.6 km	MPC · JPL
439505	2014 BD_{8}	—	January 4, 2010	Kitt Peak	Spacewatch	MAS	670 m	MPC · JPL
439506	2014 BU_{11}	—	April 2, 2011	Kitt Peak	Spacewatch	V	690 m	MPC · JPL
439507	2014 BV_{13}	—	November 8, 2007	Mount Lemmon	Mount Lemmon Survey	·	2.9 km	MPC · JPL
439508	2014 BX_{13}	—	December 18, 2003	Kitt Peak	Spacewatch	·	2.3 km	MPC · JPL
439509	2014 BS_{22}	—	July 29, 2008	Mount Lemmon	Mount Lemmon Survey	V	850 m	MPC · JPL
439510	2014 BS_{26}	—	January 27, 2007	Mount Lemmon	Mount Lemmon Survey	·	1.1 km	MPC · JPL
439511	2014 BC_{28}	—	March 30, 2004	Kitt Peak	Spacewatch	VER	2.8 km	MPC · JPL
439512	2014 BY_{30}	—	August 25, 2012	Kitt Peak	Spacewatch	·	800 m	MPC · JPL
439513	2014 BT_{31}	—	November 20, 2008	Mount Lemmon	Mount Lemmon Survey	·	1.6 km	MPC · JPL
439514	2014 BV_{31}	—	September 23, 2008	Mount Lemmon	Mount Lemmon Survey	·	1.4 km	MPC · JPL
439515	2014 BH_{37}	—	December 30, 2008	Mount Lemmon	Mount Lemmon Survey	·	2.0 km	MPC · JPL
439516	2014 BM_{37}	—	October 11, 2007	Kitt Peak	Spacewatch	·	1.8 km	MPC · JPL
439517	2014 BO_{39}	—	February 8, 2007	Mount Lemmon	Mount Lemmon Survey	·	960 m	MPC · JPL
439518	2014 BL_{41}	—	December 19, 2009	Mount Lemmon	Mount Lemmon Survey	·	1.1 km	MPC · JPL
439519	2014 BD_{42}	—	September 6, 2008	Mount Lemmon	Mount Lemmon Survey	V	630 m	MPC · JPL
439520	2014 BQ_{42}	—	January 16, 2005	Kitt Peak	Spacewatch	NEM	2.2 km	MPC · JPL
439521	2014 BW_{46}	—	December 20, 2004	Mount Lemmon	Mount Lemmon Survey	·	2.6 km	MPC · JPL
439522	2014 BP_{47}	—	January 17, 2005	Kitt Peak	Spacewatch	·	1.8 km	MPC · JPL
439523	2014 BZ_{48}	—	April 6, 2010	Catalina	CSS	·	3.5 km	MPC · JPL
439524	2014 BE_{51}	—	May 6, 2010	WISE	WISE	·	2.2 km	MPC · JPL
439525	2014 BX_{53}	—	December 25, 2005	Kitt Peak	Spacewatch	·	1.3 km	MPC · JPL
439526	2014 BK_{60}	—	January 5, 2000	Socorro	LINEAR	H	690 m	MPC · JPL
439527	2014 BZ_{60}	—	September 23, 2008	Catalina	CSS	EUN	1.6 km	MPC · JPL
439528	2014 BH_{61}	—	March 9, 2006	Kitt Peak	Spacewatch	·	1.3 km	MPC · JPL
439529	2014 BO_{64}	—	August 23, 2007	Siding Spring	SSS	·	2.7 km	MPC · JPL
439530	2014 CO	—	December 25, 2005	Kitt Peak	Spacewatch	·	2.6 km	MPC · JPL
439531	2014 CX_{1}	—	September 12, 2004	Kitt Peak	Spacewatch	·	1.6 km	MPC · JPL
439532	2014 CW_{2}	—	February 2, 2005	Kitt Peak	Spacewatch	·	2.6 km	MPC · JPL
439533	2014 CA_{9}	—	March 18, 2004	Kitt Peak	Spacewatch	·	2.3 km	MPC · JPL
439534	2014 CR_{11}	—	January 6, 2010	Kitt Peak	Spacewatch	NYS	1.1 km	MPC · JPL
439535	2014 CH_{15}	—	September 4, 2007	Mount Lemmon	Mount Lemmon Survey	·	1.3 km	MPC · JPL
439536	2014 CH_{16}	—	February 23, 2007	Mount Lemmon	Mount Lemmon Survey	V	490 m	MPC · JPL
439537	2014 DO	—	March 25, 2006	Kitt Peak	Spacewatch	H	790 m	MPC · JPL
439538	2014 DY	—	June 25, 2011	Mount Lemmon	Mount Lemmon Survey	MAR	1.3 km	MPC · JPL
439539	2014 DW_{1}	—	March 23, 2006	Kitt Peak	Spacewatch	·	1.6 km	MPC · JPL
439540	2014 DZ_{1}	—	June 27, 1998	Kitt Peak	Spacewatch	EUN	1.3 km	MPC · JPL
439541	2014 DV_{3}	—	April 12, 2010	Mount Lemmon	Mount Lemmon Survey	BRA	1.3 km	MPC · JPL
439542	2014 DV_{4}	—	October 25, 2005	Mount Lemmon	Mount Lemmon Survey	MAS	800 m	MPC · JPL
439543	2014 DJ_{5}	—	September 30, 2005	Mount Lemmon	Mount Lemmon Survey	·	1.2 km	MPC · JPL
439544	2014 DT_{5}	—	December 11, 2004	Kitt Peak	Spacewatch	·	2.3 km	MPC · JPL
439545	2014 DR_{11}	—	October 25, 2012	Mount Lemmon	Mount Lemmon Survey	·	1.8 km	MPC · JPL
439546	2014 DS_{13}	—	June 18, 2005	Mount Lemmon	Mount Lemmon Survey	·	2.4 km	MPC · JPL
439547	2014 DO_{16}	—	January 18, 2008	Kitt Peak	Spacewatch	·	4.9 km	MPC · JPL
439548	2014 DP_{18}	—	October 25, 2005	Kitt Peak	Spacewatch	NYS	890 m	MPC · JPL
439549	2014 DA_{26}	—	April 12, 2010	Mount Lemmon	Mount Lemmon Survey	·	2.1 km	MPC · JPL
439550	2014 DG_{26}	—	January 12, 2010	Mount Lemmon	Mount Lemmon Survey	·	1.2 km	MPC · JPL
439551	2014 DZ_{27}	—	January 11, 2003	Kitt Peak	Spacewatch	·	1.0 km	MPC · JPL
439552	2014 DA_{32}	—	March 7, 2003	Anderson Mesa	LONEOS	·	5.0 km	MPC · JPL
439553	2014 DC_{35}	—	February 29, 2004	Kitt Peak	Spacewatch	·	650 m	MPC · JPL
439554	2014 DZ_{35}	—	June 18, 2005	Mount Lemmon	Mount Lemmon Survey	·	2.2 km	MPC · JPL
439555	2014 DJ_{37}	—	February 27, 2003	Kleť	KLENOT	THM	2.4 km	MPC · JPL
439556	2014 DC_{46}	—	July 9, 2005	Kitt Peak	Spacewatch	·	2.9 km	MPC · JPL
439557	2014 DQ_{50}	—	November 11, 2007	Mount Lemmon	Mount Lemmon Survey	·	2.8 km	MPC · JPL
439558	2014 DM_{56}	—	February 12, 2008	Kitt Peak	Spacewatch	·	2.9 km	MPC · JPL
439559	2014 DM_{57}	—	February 2, 2005	Kitt Peak	Spacewatch	·	1.6 km	MPC · JPL
439560	2014 DY_{58}	—	January 30, 2009	Kitt Peak	Spacewatch	·	1.8 km	MPC · JPL
439561	2014 DE_{61}	—	October 30, 2007	Mount Lemmon	Mount Lemmon Survey	·	1.5 km	MPC · JPL
439562	2014 DR_{72}	—	March 25, 2010	Mount Lemmon	Mount Lemmon Survey	·	1.3 km	MPC · JPL
439563	2014 DC_{73}	—	May 22, 2003	Kitt Peak	Spacewatch	·	1.5 km	MPC · JPL
439564	2014 DM_{78}	—	February 9, 2008	Kitt Peak	Spacewatch	·	2.6 km	MPC · JPL
439565	2014 DR_{80}	—	September 23, 2008	Kitt Peak	Spacewatch	V	680 m	MPC · JPL
439566	2014 DX_{80}	—	April 1, 2009	Mount Lemmon	Mount Lemmon Survey	·	1.9 km	MPC · JPL
439567	2014 DS_{84}	—	August 28, 2005	Kitt Peak	Spacewatch	·	2.8 km	MPC · JPL
439568	2014 DL_{85}	—	March 8, 2005	Mount Lemmon	Mount Lemmon Survey	·	1.4 km	MPC · JPL
439569	2014 DH_{89}	—	February 2, 2005	Kitt Peak	Spacewatch	·	1.9 km	MPC · JPL
439570	2014 DK_{89}	—	October 11, 2001	Kitt Peak	Spacewatch	3:2	6.0 km	MPC · JPL
439571	2014 DP_{89}	—	March 10, 2005	Kitt Peak	Spacewatch	·	1.8 km	MPC · JPL
439572	2014 DP_{90}	—	September 13, 2007	Mount Lemmon	Mount Lemmon Survey	·	1.7 km	MPC · JPL
439573	2014 DK_{95}	—	October 13, 2002	Kitt Peak	Spacewatch	·	850 m	MPC · JPL
439574	2014 DF_{98}	—	September 14, 2007	Mount Lemmon	Mount Lemmon Survey	·	1.6 km	MPC · JPL
439575	2014 DM_{98}	—	September 12, 2007	Kitt Peak	Spacewatch	·	1.7 km	MPC · JPL
439576	2014 DX_{99}	—	June 3, 2006	Mount Lemmon	Mount Lemmon Survey	·	2.7 km	MPC · JPL
439577	2014 DP_{103}	—	March 3, 2005	Kitt Peak	Spacewatch	·	2.4 km	MPC · JPL
439578	2014 DL_{105}	—	May 14, 2005	Kitt Peak	Spacewatch	NAE	2.3 km	MPC · JPL
439579	2014 DQ_{105}	—	July 4, 2010	WISE	WISE	KON	3.5 km	MPC · JPL
439580	2014 DH_{108}	—	February 19, 2010	Kitt Peak	Spacewatch	·	900 m	MPC · JPL
439581	2014 DQ_{108}	—	April 14, 2005	Kitt Peak	Spacewatch	·	2.1 km	MPC · JPL
439582	2014 DS_{108}	—	September 13, 2005	Kitt Peak	Spacewatch	HYG	2.6 km	MPC · JPL
439583	2014 DP_{110}	—	December 29, 2008	Mount Lemmon	Mount Lemmon Survey	·	2.5 km	MPC · JPL
439584	2014 DH_{113}	—	October 16, 2007	Mount Lemmon	Mount Lemmon Survey	KOR	1.4 km	MPC · JPL
439585	2014 DZ_{115}	—	March 19, 2009	Kitt Peak	Spacewatch	EOS	2.1 km	MPC · JPL
439586	2014 DJ_{116}	—	January 26, 2006	Mount Lemmon	Mount Lemmon Survey	NYS	1.4 km	MPC · JPL
439587	2014 DN_{118}	—	April 22, 2007	Kitt Peak	Spacewatch	·	980 m	MPC · JPL
439588	2014 DQ_{118}	—	April 19, 2009	Kitt Peak	Spacewatch	·	3.4 km	MPC · JPL
439589	2014 DM_{122}	—	July 25, 2006	Mount Lemmon	Mount Lemmon Survey	·	2.3 km	MPC · JPL
439590	2014 DN_{122}	—	August 24, 2007	Kitt Peak	Spacewatch	·	2.3 km	MPC · JPL
439591	2014 DA_{123}	—	March 18, 2010	Mount Lemmon	Mount Lemmon Survey	·	1.4 km	MPC · JPL
439592	2014 DH_{125}	—	December 21, 2008	Mount Lemmon	Mount Lemmon Survey	·	1.9 km	MPC · JPL
439593	2014 DQ_{132}	—	March 31, 2003	Kitt Peak	Spacewatch	CLA	1.4 km	MPC · JPL
439594	2014 DS_{133}	—	January 26, 2006	Kitt Peak	Spacewatch	·	1.9 km	MPC · JPL
439595	2014 DW_{137}	—	February 28, 2008	Kitt Peak	Spacewatch	·	3.3 km	MPC · JPL
439596	2014 DL_{140}	—	December 30, 2008	Kitt Peak	Spacewatch	·	1.6 km	MPC · JPL
439597	2014 EC_{6}	—	February 24, 2009	Kitt Peak	Spacewatch	·	1.9 km	MPC · JPL
439598	2014 EZ_{14}	—	February 9, 1999	Kitt Peak	Spacewatch	·	1.1 km	MPC · JPL
439599	2014 EJ_{15}	—	October 19, 2003	Kitt Peak	Spacewatch	·	1.4 km	MPC · JPL
439600	2014 ET_{15}	—	March 2, 2009	Mount Lemmon	Mount Lemmon Survey	·	2.3 km	MPC · JPL

== 439601–439700 ==
back to top

Designation			Discovery			Properties		Ref
Permanent	Provisional	Named after	Date	Site	Discoverer(s)	Category	Diam.	Ref
439601	2014 ES_{17}	—	March 17, 2004	Kitt Peak	Spacewatch	·	2.4 km	MPC · JPL
439602	2014 ES_{19}	—	February 2, 2006	Mount Lemmon	Mount Lemmon Survey	·	1.2 km	MPC · JPL
439603	2014 EZ_{21}	—	September 12, 2007	Kitt Peak	Spacewatch	·	1.4 km	MPC · JPL
439604	2014 EF_{23}	—	September 12, 2007	Mount Lemmon	Mount Lemmon Survey	·	1.6 km	MPC · JPL
439605	2014 EH_{23}	—	September 15, 2006	Kitt Peak	Spacewatch	·	2.2 km	MPC · JPL
439606	2014 EE_{24}	—	December 31, 2002	Socorro	LINEAR	·	2.8 km	MPC · JPL
439607	2014 EE_{25}	—	November 1, 2008	Mount Lemmon	Mount Lemmon Survey	·	1.1 km	MPC · JPL
439608	2014 EC_{27}	—	December 22, 2008	Kitt Peak	Spacewatch	·	1.5 km	MPC · JPL
439609	2014 EZ_{27}	—	February 17, 2007	Catalina	CSS	·	850 m	MPC · JPL
439610	2014 EL_{32}	—	March 12, 2005	Kitt Peak	Spacewatch	·	2.2 km	MPC · JPL
439611	2014 EQ_{32}	—	January 19, 2008	Mount Lemmon	Mount Lemmon Survey	·	2.9 km	MPC · JPL
439612	2014 EU_{32}	—	February 21, 2007	Kitt Peak	Spacewatch	·	880 m	MPC · JPL
439613	2014 EF_{35}	—	February 19, 2001	Socorro	LINEAR	·	2.3 km	MPC · JPL
439614	2014 EA_{39}	—	September 15, 2012	Catalina	CSS	CLO	2.4 km	MPC · JPL
439615	2014 EX_{44}	—	May 20, 2006	Kitt Peak	Spacewatch	·	1.7 km	MPC · JPL
439616	2014 ER_{45}	—	January 19, 2004	Kitt Peak	Spacewatch	·	2.0 km	MPC · JPL
439617	2014 EC_{46}	—	August 29, 2005	Kitt Peak	Spacewatch	·	3.3 km	MPC · JPL
439618	2014 EO_{46}	—	February 9, 2008	Mount Lemmon	Mount Lemmon Survey	·	2.6 km	MPC · JPL
439619	2014 EJ_{48}	—	December 2, 2012	Catalina	CSS	·	2.9 km	MPC · JPL
439620	2014 EH_{49}	—	December 6, 2007	Kitt Peak	Spacewatch	·	2.5 km	MPC · JPL
439621	2014 FZ_{3}	—	December 30, 2007	Mount Lemmon	Mount Lemmon Survey	EOS	2.1 km	MPC · JPL
439622	2014 FV_{9}	—	January 29, 1995	Kitt Peak	Spacewatch	·	630 m	MPC · JPL
439623	2014 FD_{16}	—	February 12, 2008	Mount Lemmon	Mount Lemmon Survey	LIX	3.1 km	MPC · JPL
439624	2014 FV_{18}	—	October 24, 2008	Kitt Peak	Spacewatch	·	1.2 km	MPC · JPL
439625	2014 FD_{19}	—	November 26, 2005	Kitt Peak	Spacewatch	·	1.2 km	MPC · JPL
439626	2014 FM_{19}	—	March 10, 2010	XuYi	PMO NEO Survey Program	·	1.9 km	MPC · JPL
439627	2014 FE_{20}	—	April 8, 2010	Kitt Peak	Spacewatch	·	1.4 km	MPC · JPL
439628	2014 FO_{28}	—	October 30, 2008	Kitt Peak	Spacewatch	·	1.2 km	MPC · JPL
439629	2014 FP_{29}	—	December 8, 2005	Kitt Peak	Spacewatch	·	1.0 km	MPC · JPL
439630	2014 FJ_{30}	—	February 26, 2010	WISE	WISE	·	1.9 km	MPC · JPL
439631	2014 FX_{49}	—	November 6, 2007	Kitt Peak	Spacewatch	·	3.5 km	MPC · JPL
439632	2014 FS_{53}	—	December 31, 2007	Mount Lemmon	Mount Lemmon Survey	·	2.2 km	MPC · JPL
439633	2014 FF_{57}	—	April 7, 2003	Kitt Peak	Spacewatch	·	1.3 km	MPC · JPL
439634	2014 FS_{62}	—	June 1, 2009	Catalina	CSS	·	3.5 km	MPC · JPL
439635	2014 FS_{64}	—	September 30, 2006	Mount Lemmon	Mount Lemmon Survey	KOR	2.0 km	MPC · JPL
439636	2014 FA_{68}	—	November 27, 2006	Mount Lemmon	Mount Lemmon Survey	EOS	3.0 km	MPC · JPL
439637	2014 FU_{68}	—	June 3, 2010	Kitt Peak	Spacewatch	·	2.0 km	MPC · JPL
439638	2014 GY_{6}	—	December 15, 2004	Kitt Peak	Spacewatch	·	1.4 km	MPC · JPL
439639	2014 GF_{12}	—	January 11, 2008	Mount Lemmon	Mount Lemmon Survey	·	2.6 km	MPC · JPL
439640	2014 GH_{20}	—	January 11, 2008	Kitt Peak	Spacewatch	·	2.5 km	MPC · JPL
439641	2014 GQ_{20}	—	October 12, 2007	Mount Lemmon	Mount Lemmon Survey	·	1.7 km	MPC · JPL
439642	2014 GE_{37}	—	May 22, 2010	WISE	WISE	·	2.2 km	MPC · JPL
439643	2014 GS_{38}	—	February 1, 2006	Kitt Peak	Spacewatch	NYS	1.4 km	MPC · JPL
439644	2014 GT_{39}	—	August 19, 2006	Kitt Peak	Spacewatch	AGN	1.1 km	MPC · JPL
439645	2014 GP_{45}	—	November 19, 2008	Mount Lemmon	Mount Lemmon Survey	EUN	1.5 km	MPC · JPL
439646	2014 GD_{47}	—	September 30, 2003	Kitt Peak	Spacewatch	·	1.4 km	MPC · JPL
439647	2014 HN_{8}	—	February 9, 2003	Kitt Peak	Spacewatch	·	2.4 km	MPC · JPL
439648	2014 HO_{8}	—	September 10, 2007	Kitt Peak	Spacewatch	·	1.3 km	MPC · JPL
439649	2014 HY_{11}	—	April 5, 2003	Kitt Peak	Spacewatch	·	3.1 km	MPC · JPL
439650	2014 HF_{25}	—	January 18, 2012	Mount Lemmon	Mount Lemmon Survey	3:2 · SHU	5.0 km	MPC · JPL
439651	2014 HA_{29}	—	March 1, 2005	Kitt Peak	Spacewatch	·	1.8 km	MPC · JPL
439652	2014 HA_{30}	—	September 18, 1995	Kitt Peak	Spacewatch	EOS	1.9 km	MPC · JPL
439653	2014 HM_{30}	—	March 26, 2004	Kitt Peak	Spacewatch	·	2.9 km	MPC · JPL
439654	2014 HK_{31}	—	April 21, 2006	Kitt Peak	Spacewatch	·	1.3 km	MPC · JPL
439655	2014 HU_{33}	—	November 18, 2003	Kitt Peak	Spacewatch	·	1.6 km	MPC · JPL
439656	2014 HO_{37}	—	April 4, 2008	Mount Lemmon	Mount Lemmon Survey	·	3.7 km	MPC · JPL
439657	2014 HF_{38}	—	November 4, 2007	Mount Lemmon	Mount Lemmon Survey	·	1.7 km	MPC · JPL
439658	2014 HX_{40}	—	March 28, 2008	Mount Lemmon	Mount Lemmon Survey	·	2.3 km	MPC · JPL
439659	2014 HM_{55}	—	December 13, 2004	Kitt Peak	Spacewatch	(5)	1.5 km	MPC · JPL
439660	2014 HG_{75}	—	October 3, 2006	Mount Lemmon	Mount Lemmon Survey	KOR	1.4 km	MPC · JPL
439661	2014 HK_{77}	—	September 27, 2006	Kitt Peak	Spacewatch	·	1.7 km	MPC · JPL
439662	2014 HT_{78}	—	October 10, 2007	Mount Lemmon	Mount Lemmon Survey	·	1.7 km	MPC · JPL
439663	2014 HK_{82}	—	September 18, 2003	Kitt Peak	Spacewatch	·	1.4 km	MPC · JPL
439664	2014 HM_{115}	—	October 28, 2011	Mount Lemmon	Mount Lemmon Survey	·	2.4 km	MPC · JPL
439665	2014 HB_{122}	—	October 26, 2005	Kitt Peak	Spacewatch	·	4.3 km	MPC · JPL
439666	2014 HV_{122}	—	November 5, 2005	Mount Lemmon	Mount Lemmon Survey	·	2.6 km	MPC · JPL
439667	2014 HD_{127}	—	April 21, 2009	Kitt Peak	Spacewatch	·	2.0 km	MPC · JPL
439668	2014 HB_{152}	—	February 3, 2009	Kitt Peak	Spacewatch	·	1.7 km	MPC · JPL
439669	2014 HH_{160}	—	February 26, 2008	Mount Lemmon	Mount Lemmon Survey	·	2.7 km	MPC · JPL
439670	2014 HX_{166}	—	September 2, 2000	Anderson Mesa	LONEOS	MAS	1.0 km	MPC · JPL
439671	2014 HH_{169}	—	March 31, 2003	Kitt Peak	Spacewatch	fast	3.2 km	MPC · JPL
439672	2014 HM_{171}	—	April 14, 2010	Kitt Peak	Spacewatch	·	1.3 km	MPC · JPL
439673	2014 HY_{181}	—	June 16, 2005	Mount Lemmon	Mount Lemmon Survey	·	1.9 km	MPC · JPL
439674	2014 HT_{187}	—	June 8, 2010	WISE	WISE	·	4.6 km	MPC · JPL
439675	2014 HL_{191}	—	September 6, 2008	Kitt Peak	Spacewatch	3:2	4.3 km	MPC · JPL
439676	2014 JV_{4}	—	April 4, 2008	Mount Lemmon	Mount Lemmon Survey	VER	2.9 km	MPC · JPL
439677	2014 JA_{5}	—	December 14, 2010	Mount Lemmon	Mount Lemmon Survey	3:2	5.6 km	MPC · JPL
439678	2014 JE_{9}	—	April 5, 2003	Kitt Peak	Spacewatch	·	3.8 km	MPC · JPL
439679	2014 JX_{10}	—	October 2, 2006	Mount Lemmon	Mount Lemmon Survey	·	1.5 km	MPC · JPL
439680	2014 JM_{16}	—	January 10, 2007	Kitt Peak	Spacewatch	·	3.4 km	MPC · JPL
439681	2014 JH_{26}	—	April 8, 2008	Mount Lemmon	Mount Lemmon Survey	EOS	1.8 km	MPC · JPL
439682	2014 JY_{31}	—	October 11, 2007	Mount Lemmon	Mount Lemmon Survey	·	1.5 km	MPC · JPL
439683	2014 JN_{35}	—	February 26, 2009	Kitt Peak	Spacewatch	MRX	1.0 km	MPC · JPL
439684	2014 JD_{38}	—	November 22, 2006	Kitt Peak	Spacewatch	TEL	1.7 km	MPC · JPL
439685	2014 JT_{42}	—	December 1, 2006	Mount Lemmon	Mount Lemmon Survey	·	3.0 km	MPC · JPL
439686	2014 JK_{45}	—	May 29, 2009	Kitt Peak	Spacewatch	·	2.6 km	MPC · JPL
439687	2014 JF_{51}	—	October 25, 2005	Mount Lemmon	Mount Lemmon Survey	·	3.6 km	MPC · JPL
439688	2014 JN_{59}	—	April 20, 2004	Kitt Peak	Spacewatch	BRA	1.6 km	MPC · JPL
439689	2014 JD_{60}	—	January 26, 2006	Kitt Peak	Spacewatch	CYB	3.5 km	MPC · JPL
439690	2014 JE_{60}	—	November 16, 2006	Mount Lemmon	Mount Lemmon Survey	·	2.2 km	MPC · JPL
439691	2014 JV_{76}	—	April 14, 2005	Kitt Peak	Spacewatch	·	2.0 km	MPC · JPL
439692	2014 KH_{3}	—	March 29, 2008	Catalina	CSS	VER	3.6 km	MPC · JPL
439693	2014 KY_{4}	—	October 22, 2005	Kitt Peak	Spacewatch	·	3.8 km	MPC · JPL
439694	2014 KT_{7}	—	December 7, 1999	Kitt Peak	Spacewatch	·	3.8 km	MPC · JPL
439695	2014 KV_{9}	—	November 28, 2005	Mount Lemmon	Mount Lemmon Survey	·	2.4 km	MPC · JPL
439696	2014 KP_{10}	—	June 26, 2010	WISE	WISE	URS	3.3 km	MPC · JPL
439697	2014 KP_{14}	—	May 2, 2003	Kitt Peak	Spacewatch	·	4.0 km	MPC · JPL
439698	2014 KA_{19}	—	April 3, 2008	Mount Lemmon	Mount Lemmon Survey	·	2.6 km	MPC · JPL
439699	2014 KY_{23}	—	January 29, 2009	Mount Lemmon	Mount Lemmon Survey	·	1.9 km	MPC · JPL
439700	2014 KS_{29}	—	December 26, 2005	Kitt Peak	Spacewatch	V	620 m	MPC · JPL

== 439701–439800 ==
back to top

Designation			Discovery			Properties		Ref
Permanent	Provisional	Named after	Date	Site	Discoverer(s)	Category	Diam.	Ref
439701	2014 KN_{42}	—	March 10, 2005	Catalina	CSS	MAR	1.4 km	MPC · JPL
439702	2014 KZ_{47}	—	March 11, 2008	Kitt Peak	Spacewatch	·	4.0 km	MPC · JPL
439703	2014 KO_{73}	—	November 18, 2011	Mount Lemmon	Mount Lemmon Survey	·	2.5 km	MPC · JPL
439704	2014 KB_{74}	—	March 1, 2008	Catalina	CSS	·	3.8 km	MPC · JPL
439705	2014 KB_{80}	—	October 29, 2005	Catalina	CSS	·	3.7 km	MPC · JPL
439706	2014 KB_{88}	—	May 4, 2005	Kitt Peak	Spacewatch	·	2.0 km	MPC · JPL
439707	2014 LT_{4}	—	October 11, 2010	Mount Lemmon	Mount Lemmon Survey	·	2.9 km	MPC · JPL
439708	2014 LF_{6}	—	April 5, 2008	Mount Lemmon	Mount Lemmon Survey	·	3.3 km	MPC · JPL
439709	2014 LH_{11}	—	April 8, 2008	Kitt Peak	Spacewatch	·	3.3 km	MPC · JPL
439710	2014 LK_{11}	—	March 27, 2009	Siding Spring	SSS	·	3.6 km	MPC · JPL
439711	2014 LM_{14}	—	November 30, 2008	Mount Lemmon	Mount Lemmon Survey	·	1.7 km	MPC · JPL
439712	2014 LS_{17}	—	January 13, 2002	Socorro	LINEAR	EOS	2.0 km	MPC · JPL
439713	2014 LQ_{20}	—	February 22, 2004	Kitt Peak	Spacewatch	PAD	2.0 km	MPC · JPL
439714	2014 MR_{32}	—	November 24, 2000	Anderson Mesa	LONEOS	·	3.1 km	MPC · JPL
439715	2014 MC_{35}	—	October 21, 2006	Kitt Peak	Spacewatch	·	2.5 km	MPC · JPL
439716	2014 MJ_{42}	—	October 30, 2005	Catalina	CSS	·	2.9 km	MPC · JPL
439717	2014 MX_{42}	—	November 2, 2010	Mount Lemmon	Mount Lemmon Survey	THB	3.3 km	MPC · JPL
439718 Danielcervantes	2015 DW_{137}	Danielcervantes	April 12, 2010	WISE	WISE	·	4.0 km	MPC · JPL
439719	2015 DV_{176}	—	March 18, 2004	Socorro	LINEAR	·	1.8 km	MPC · JPL
439720	2015 DZ_{205}	—	December 13, 2006	Mount Lemmon	Mount Lemmon Survey	·	1.4 km	MPC · JPL
439721	2015 DY_{206}	—	April 16, 2004	Kitt Peak	Spacewatch	EOS	2.2 km	MPC · JPL
439722	2015 DB_{208}	—	April 21, 2006	Kitt Peak	Spacewatch	·	2.8 km	MPC · JPL
439723	2015 DQ_{208}	—	August 11, 2007	Socorro	LINEAR	·	2.2 km	MPC · JPL
439724	2015 DE_{210}	—	March 9, 2005	Catalina	CSS	·	2.1 km	MPC · JPL
439725	2015 DG_{210}	—	November 29, 2005	Mount Lemmon	Mount Lemmon Survey	·	1.6 km	MPC · JPL
439726	2015 DT_{210}	—	May 14, 2004	Kitt Peak	Spacewatch	·	3.4 km	MPC · JPL
439727	2015 DH_{211}	—	January 7, 2010	Mount Lemmon	Mount Lemmon Survey	·	1.6 km	MPC · JPL
439728	2015 DM_{213}	—	January 9, 2006	Kitt Peak	Spacewatch	KON	2.3 km	MPC · JPL
439729	2015 DQ_{214}	—	September 6, 2008	Mount Lemmon	Mount Lemmon Survey	·	1.4 km	MPC · JPL
439730	2015 ED_{65}	—	April 21, 1998	Socorro	LINEAR	T_{j} (2.98)	7.4 km	MPC · JPL
439731	2015 FN_{39}	—	September 4, 2008	Kitt Peak	Spacewatch	L4	7.9 km	MPC · JPL
439732	2015 FB_{75}	—	September 5, 2008	Kitt Peak	Spacewatch	L4	10 km	MPC · JPL
439733	2015 FY_{162}	—	September 18, 2009	Mount Lemmon	Mount Lemmon Survey	·	1.6 km	MPC · JPL
439734	2015 FS_{174}	—	May 11, 2007	Mount Lemmon	Mount Lemmon Survey	·	1.4 km	MPC · JPL
439735	2015 FX_{174}	—	February 11, 2004	Kitt Peak	Spacewatch	·	1.9 km	MPC · JPL
439736	2015 FC_{176}	—	May 25, 2003	Kitt Peak	Spacewatch	·	1.4 km	MPC · JPL
439737	2015 FM_{212}	—	May 25, 2007	Mount Lemmon	Mount Lemmon Survey	·	1.8 km	MPC · JPL
439738	2015 FD_{213}	—	July 22, 2000	Prescott	P. G. Comba	·	2.5 km	MPC · JPL
439739	2015 FC_{286}	—	September 27, 2008	Catalina	CSS	·	3.1 km	MPC · JPL
439740	2015 FU_{286}	—	December 17, 2003	Socorro	LINEAR	H	520 m	MPC · JPL
439741	2015 FK_{287}	—	January 30, 2006	Catalina	CSS	·	2.3 km	MPC · JPL
439742	2015 FM_{294}	—	March 13, 2010	Kitt Peak	Spacewatch	BRA	1.9 km	MPC · JPL
439743	2015 FL_{296}	—	April 16, 2004	Socorro	LINEAR	·	4.0 km	MPC · JPL
439744	2015 FA_{297}	—	September 3, 2008	Kitt Peak	Spacewatch	·	1.6 km	MPC · JPL
439745	2015 FT_{299}	—	April 7, 2006	Anderson Mesa	LONEOS	EUN	1.7 km	MPC · JPL
439746	2015 FJ_{300}	—	March 17, 2004	Kitt Peak	Spacewatch	H	440 m	MPC · JPL
439747	2015 FW_{300}	—	March 5, 2006	Catalina	CSS	·	3.3 km	MPC · JPL
439748	2015 FZ_{303}	—	June 27, 1997	Kitt Peak	Spacewatch	·	1.1 km	MPC · JPL
439749	2015 FG_{305}	—	July 25, 1995	Kitt Peak	Spacewatch	·	1.9 km	MPC · JPL
439750	2015 FC_{324}	—	October 24, 2009	Mount Lemmon	Mount Lemmon Survey	·	3.1 km	MPC · JPL
439751	2015 FB_{325}	—	October 7, 2008	Mount Lemmon	Mount Lemmon Survey	·	2.3 km	MPC · JPL
439752	2015 FP_{325}	—	December 1, 2006	Mount Lemmon	Mount Lemmon Survey	V	870 m	MPC · JPL
439753	2015 FZ_{325}	—	November 20, 2001	Socorro	LINEAR	·	3.4 km	MPC · JPL
439754	2015 FD_{327}	—	February 24, 2006	Mount Lemmon	Mount Lemmon Survey	·	1.6 km	MPC · JPL
439755	2015 FH_{327}	—	May 31, 2000	Kitt Peak	Spacewatch	·	1.2 km	MPC · JPL
439756	2015 FJ_{334}	—	December 24, 2006	Kitt Peak	Spacewatch	·	1.4 km	MPC · JPL
439757	2015 FR_{335}	—	October 21, 2003	Kitt Peak	Spacewatch	·	2.0 km	MPC · JPL
439758	2015 FL_{336}	—	May 3, 2005	Kitt Peak	Spacewatch	·	650 m	MPC · JPL
439759	2015 FN_{336}	—	May 29, 2010	WISE	WISE	·	3.0 km	MPC · JPL
439760	2015 FA_{337}	—	February 25, 2006	Mount Lemmon	Mount Lemmon Survey	·	1.5 km	MPC · JPL
439761	2015 FH_{337}	—	November 15, 1995	Kitt Peak	Spacewatch	·	1.5 km	MPC · JPL
439762	2015 FR_{338}	—	September 28, 2009	Mount Lemmon	Mount Lemmon Survey	·	950 m	MPC · JPL
439763	2015 FF_{339}	—	December 13, 2006	Mount Lemmon	Mount Lemmon Survey	·	1.3 km	MPC · JPL
439764	2015 FC_{343}	—	November 13, 2007	Mount Lemmon	Mount Lemmon Survey	LIX	3.7 km	MPC · JPL
439765	2015 FP_{343}	—	June 10, 2010	Catalina	CSS	·	2.9 km	MPC · JPL
439766	2015 FP_{344}	—	January 21, 2002	Kitt Peak	Spacewatch	(5)	3.0 km	MPC · JPL
439767	2015 GN_{5}	—	March 25, 2006	Kitt Peak	Spacewatch	EUN	1.6 km	MPC · JPL
439768	2015 GP_{5}	—	October 9, 2004	Kitt Peak	Spacewatch	·	4.1 km	MPC · JPL
439769	2015 GB_{8}	—	February 22, 2009	Catalina	CSS	·	4.0 km	MPC · JPL
439770	2015 GW_{8}	—	January 10, 2006	Kitt Peak	Spacewatch	·	1.5 km	MPC · JPL
439771	2015 GK_{9}	—	March 23, 2004	Catalina	CSS	·	2.9 km	MPC · JPL
439772	2015 GH_{18}	—	November 7, 2012	Mount Lemmon	Mount Lemmon Survey	·	4.2 km	MPC · JPL
439773	2015 GM_{23}	—	March 10, 2005	Catalina	CSS	·	2.1 km	MPC · JPL
439774	2015 GW_{23}	—	December 17, 2009	Kitt Peak	Spacewatch	·	1.5 km	MPC · JPL
439775	2015 GO_{24}	—	January 29, 2009	Mount Lemmon	Mount Lemmon Survey	EOS	1.8 km	MPC · JPL
439776	2015 GR_{24}	—	June 5, 2010	Kitt Peak	Spacewatch	EOS	2.3 km	MPC · JPL
439777	2015 GW_{24}	—	November 13, 2006	Catalina	CSS	VER	3.4 km	MPC · JPL
439778	2015 GE_{25}	—	August 27, 1998	Kitt Peak	Spacewatch	·	2.0 km	MPC · JPL
439779	2015 GB_{26}	—	March 3, 2006	Catalina	CSS	·	1.7 km	MPC · JPL
439780	2015 GQ_{26}	—	July 11, 2005	Kitt Peak	Spacewatch	·	3.4 km	MPC · JPL
439781	2015 GF_{33}	—	December 18, 2007	Mount Lemmon	Mount Lemmon Survey	·	3.4 km	MPC · JPL
439782	2015 GL_{34}	—	September 7, 1999	Kitt Peak	Spacewatch	·	2.7 km	MPC · JPL
439783	2015 GJ_{36}	—	March 11, 2008	Kitt Peak	Spacewatch	·	710 m	MPC · JPL
439784	2015 GR_{36}	—	November 10, 2004	Kitt Peak	Spacewatch	EUN	1.7 km	MPC · JPL
439785	2015 GT_{40}	—	November 17, 2006	Mount Lemmon	Mount Lemmon Survey	·	1.0 km	MPC · JPL
439786	2015 GQ_{42}	—	May 2, 2003	Kitt Peak	Spacewatch	·	1.2 km	MPC · JPL
439787	2015 GQ_{43}	—	December 14, 2006	Kitt Peak	Spacewatch	·	1 km	MPC · JPL
439788	2015 GL_{44}	—	February 21, 2006	Catalina	CSS	·	2.4 km	MPC · JPL
439789	2015 GO_{45}	—	April 11, 2005	Kitt Peak	Spacewatch	·	930 m	MPC · JPL
439790	2015 HA_{16}	—	September 26, 2009	Mount Lemmon	Mount Lemmon Survey	·	830 m	MPC · JPL
439791	2015 HF_{38}	—	February 9, 2008	Kitt Peak	Spacewatch	·	770 m	MPC · JPL
439792	2015 HY_{42}	—	May 28, 1998	Kitt Peak	Spacewatch	·	880 m	MPC · JPL
439793	2015 HP_{49}	—	May 9, 2005	Kitt Peak	Spacewatch	EOS	1.6 km	MPC · JPL
439794	2015 HB_{57}	—	March 16, 2008	Kitt Peak	Spacewatch	·	700 m	MPC · JPL
439795	2015 HQ_{60}	—	March 3, 2006	Kitt Peak	Spacewatch	·	1.4 km	MPC · JPL
439796	2015 HS_{63}	—	May 16, 2004	Socorro	LINEAR	MAS	920 m	MPC · JPL
439797	2015 HF_{73}	—	April 7, 2008	Kitt Peak	Spacewatch	·	750 m	MPC · JPL
439798	2015 HK_{100}	—	October 27, 2008	Kitt Peak	Spacewatch	EUN	1.3 km	MPC · JPL
439799	2015 HN_{103}	—	June 11, 2005	Kitt Peak	Spacewatch	EOS	2.1 km	MPC · JPL
439800	2015 HK_{147}	—	September 30, 2006	Kitt Peak	Spacewatch	·	3.1 km	MPC · JPL

== 439801–439900 ==
back to top

Designation			Discovery			Properties		Ref
Permanent	Provisional	Named after	Date	Site	Discoverer(s)	Category	Diam.	Ref
439801	2015 HN_{166}	—	September 21, 2012	Mount Lemmon	Mount Lemmon Survey	NYS	930 m	MPC · JPL
439802	2015 HG_{171}	—	March 18, 2004	Socorro	LINEAR	·	1.2 km	MPC · JPL
439803	2015 HF_{174}	—	December 20, 2004	Mount Lemmon	Mount Lemmon Survey	GEF	1.6 km	MPC · JPL
439804	2015 HP_{175}	—	November 15, 2006	Catalina	CSS	·	1.1 km	MPC · JPL
439805	2015 HB_{176}	—	December 4, 1996	Kitt Peak	Spacewatch	·	2.2 km	MPC · JPL
439806	2015 HA_{178}	—	March 3, 2006	Mount Lemmon	Mount Lemmon Survey	·	1.9 km	MPC · JPL
439807	2015 JP_{2}	—	March 15, 2009	Mount Lemmon	Mount Lemmon Survey	·	5.6 km	MPC · JPL
439808	2015 JR_{2}	—	March 9, 2003	Anderson Mesa	LONEOS	·	5.2 km	MPC · JPL
439809	2015 KZ_{7}	—	February 1, 2008	Kitt Peak	Spacewatch	EOS	2.0 km	MPC · JPL
439810	2015 KM_{9}	—	November 5, 2007	Mount Lemmon	Mount Lemmon Survey	·	3.5 km	MPC · JPL
439811	2015 KC_{16}	—	March 24, 2003	Kitt Peak	Spacewatch	·	3.4 km	MPC · JPL
439812	2015 KE_{18}	—	April 26, 2004	Socorro	LINEAR	·	4.5 km	MPC · JPL
439813	2015 KH_{22}	—	March 25, 2006	Catalina	CSS	EUN	1.4 km	MPC · JPL
439814	2015 KB_{25}	—	December 10, 2004	Kitt Peak	Spacewatch	·	1.9 km	MPC · JPL
439815	2015 KT_{32}	—	April 25, 2004	Kitt Peak	Spacewatch	·	1.2 km	MPC · JPL
439816	2015 KE_{33}	—	October 15, 2007	Kitt Peak	Spacewatch	·	2.3 km	MPC · JPL
439817	2015 KY_{33}	—	January 9, 2007	Mount Lemmon	Mount Lemmon Survey	·	1.0 km	MPC · JPL
439818	2015 KB_{35}	—	May 12, 2005	Palomar	NEAT	·	3.1 km	MPC · JPL
439819	2015 KU_{58}	—	November 19, 1995	Kitt Peak	Spacewatch	·	2.0 km	MPC · JPL
439820	2015 KX_{59}	—	October 15, 2007	Mount Lemmon	Mount Lemmon Survey	·	6.8 km	MPC · JPL
439821	2015 KV_{67}	—	May 9, 2006	Mount Lemmon	Mount Lemmon Survey	·	1.8 km	MPC · JPL
439822	2015 KX_{71}	—	February 17, 2007	Kitt Peak	Spacewatch	·	1.6 km	MPC · JPL
439823	2015 KE_{73}	—	November 20, 2008	Kitt Peak	Spacewatch	·	2.2 km	MPC · JPL
439824	2015 KG_{73}	—	September 17, 1998	Kitt Peak	Spacewatch	·	2.1 km	MPC · JPL
439825	2015 KP_{73}	—	September 27, 2006	Kitt Peak	Spacewatch	·	3.1 km	MPC · JPL
439826	2015 KE_{83}	—	September 12, 2007	Catalina	CSS	·	3.3 km	MPC · JPL
439827	2015 KB_{92}	—	March 31, 2009	Mount Lemmon	Mount Lemmon Survey	·	3.4 km	MPC · JPL
439828	2015 KT_{95}	—	April 6, 2011	Mount Lemmon	Mount Lemmon Survey	·	1.4 km	MPC · JPL
439829	2015 KD_{96}	—	December 4, 2007	Catalina	CSS	·	2.9 km	MPC · JPL
439830	2015 KS_{117}	—	February 9, 2005	Mount Lemmon	Mount Lemmon Survey	·	2.3 km	MPC · JPL
439831	1994 RD_{7}	—	September 12, 1994	Kitt Peak	Spacewatch	·	1.2 km	MPC · JPL
439832	1995 OO_{5}	—	July 22, 1995	Kitt Peak	Spacewatch	·	490 m	MPC · JPL
439833	1995 SS_{73}	—	September 29, 1995	Kitt Peak	Spacewatch	·	690 m	MPC · JPL
439834	1995 UV_{42}	—	October 24, 1995	Kitt Peak	Spacewatch	·	1.4 km	MPC · JPL
439835	1995 WY_{40}	—	November 26, 1995	Kitt Peak	Spacewatch	·	710 m	MPC · JPL
439836	1996 TX_{51}	—	October 5, 1996	La Silla	E. W. Elst	·	3.5 km	MPC · JPL
439837	1997 EU_{9}	—	March 3, 1997	Kitt Peak	Spacewatch	·	1.7 km	MPC · JPL
439838	1997 GZ_{30}	—	April 10, 1997	Kitt Peak	Spacewatch	JUN	980 m	MPC · JPL
439839	1997 KY_{1}	—	May 28, 1997	Kitt Peak	Spacewatch	·	1.0 km	MPC · JPL
439840	1997 SB_{33}	—	September 29, 1997	Kitt Peak	Spacewatch	·	1.2 km	MPC · JPL
439841	1997 TB_{20}	—	October 3, 1997	Kitt Peak	Spacewatch	·	1.7 km	MPC · JPL
439842	1998 KL_{10}	—	May 19, 1998	Kitt Peak	Spacewatch	·	1.9 km	MPC · JPL
439843	1998 QR_{29}	—	August 23, 1998	Xinglong	SCAP	·	1.2 km	MPC · JPL
439844	1998 RF_{26}	—	September 14, 1998	Socorro	LINEAR	·	1.6 km	MPC · JPL
439845	1998 RJ_{54}	—	September 14, 1998	Socorro	LINEAR	·	780 m	MPC · JPL
439846	1998 SL_{6}	—	September 20, 1998	Kitt Peak	Spacewatch	(5)	1.3 km	MPC · JPL
439847	1998 SY_{7}	—	September 20, 1998	Kitt Peak	Spacewatch	THM	2.5 km	MPC · JPL
439848	1998 SF_{110}	—	September 26, 1998	Socorro	LINEAR	·	1.3 km	MPC · JPL
439849	1998 TB_{3}	—	October 14, 1998	Catalina	CSS	·	3.2 km	MPC · JPL
439850	1998 TK_{3}	—	October 14, 1998	Socorro	LINEAR	·	2.6 km	MPC · JPL
439851	1998 WP_{25}	—	November 16, 1998	Kitt Peak	Spacewatch	·	790 m	MPC · JPL
439852	1998 WX_{29}	—	November 24, 1998	Kitt Peak	Spacewatch	·	730 m	MPC · JPL
439853	1998 XD_{4}	—	December 8, 1998	Kitt Peak	Spacewatch	·	650 m	MPC · JPL
439854	1998 XA_{5}	—	December 12, 1998	Socorro	LINEAR	AMO	640 m	MPC · JPL
439855	1998 XF_{7}	—	December 8, 1998	Kitt Peak	Spacewatch	JUN	840 m	MPC · JPL
439856	1998 XR_{98}	—	December 13, 1998	Kitt Peak	Spacewatch	·	730 m	MPC · JPL
439857	1998 YJ_{13}	—	November 14, 1998	Kitt Peak	Spacewatch	GEF	1.3 km	MPC · JPL
439858	1999 ON_{4}	—	July 19, 1999	Mauna Kea	Mauna Kea	cubewano (cold)	110 km	MPC · JPL
439859	1999 RF_{9}	—	September 4, 1999	Kitt Peak	Spacewatch	THM	1.6 km	MPC · JPL
439860	1999 SZ_{20}	—	September 30, 1999	Kitt Peak	Spacewatch	·	770 m	MPC · JPL
439861	1999 SW_{22}	—	September 30, 1999	Kitt Peak	Spacewatch	ADE	1.8 km	MPC · JPL
439862	1999 TT_{45}	—	October 3, 1999	Kitt Peak	Spacewatch	(5)	860 m	MPC · JPL
439863	1999 TH_{50}	—	October 4, 1999	Kitt Peak	Spacewatch	·	2.8 km	MPC · JPL
439864	1999 TL_{54}	—	October 6, 1999	Kitt Peak	Spacewatch	HYG	2.6 km	MPC · JPL
439865	1999 TB_{72}	—	October 9, 1999	Kitt Peak	Spacewatch	·	500 m	MPC · JPL
439866	1999 TN_{296}	—	October 2, 1999	Kitt Peak	Spacewatch	·	3.3 km	MPC · JPL
439867	1999 VC_{85}	—	November 6, 1999	Kitt Peak	Spacewatch	·	3.1 km	MPC · JPL
439868	1999 VA_{102}	—	November 9, 1999	Socorro	LINEAR	·	1.2 km	MPC · JPL
439869	1999 VZ_{106}	—	November 9, 1999	Socorro	LINEAR	V	690 m	MPC · JPL
439870	1999 VL_{110}	—	November 9, 1999	Socorro	LINEAR	·	840 m	MPC · JPL
439871	1999 VC_{120}	—	November 3, 1999	Kitt Peak	Spacewatch	HYG	2.5 km	MPC · JPL
439872	1999 VA_{122}	—	October 14, 1999	Kitt Peak	Spacewatch	·	860 m	MPC · JPL
439873	1999 VP_{142}	—	November 10, 1999	Kitt Peak	Spacewatch	·	630 m	MPC · JPL
439874	1999 VB_{153}	—	November 11, 1999	Kitt Peak	Spacewatch	·	950 m	MPC · JPL
439875	1999 VX_{165}	—	November 14, 1999	Socorro	LINEAR	(5)	1.2 km	MPC · JPL
439876	1999 VM_{196}	—	November 1, 1999	Catalina	CSS	·	2.7 km	MPC · JPL
439877	1999 XM_{141}	—	December 13, 1999	Socorro	LINEAR	APO · PHA	410 m	MPC · JPL
439878	1999 XZ_{145}	—	December 7, 1999	Kitt Peak	Spacewatch	·	930 m	MPC · JPL
439879	1999 XC_{146}	—	November 29, 1999	Kitt Peak	Spacewatch	·	680 m	MPC · JPL
439880	1999 XV_{223}	—	December 13, 1999	Kitt Peak	Spacewatch	·	910 m	MPC · JPL
439881	1999 XE_{250}	—	December 7, 1999	Socorro	LINEAR	·	1.8 km	MPC · JPL
439882	1999 YZ_{12}	—	December 14, 1999	Kitt Peak	Spacewatch	EUN	1.2 km	MPC · JPL
439883	2000 AB_{4}	—	January 3, 2000	Socorro	LINEAR	·	2.2 km	MPC · JPL
439884	2000 AT_{221}	—	January 8, 2000	Kitt Peak	Spacewatch	·	1.7 km	MPC · JPL
439885	2000 CD_{32}	—	February 4, 2000	Socorro	LINEAR	·	760 m	MPC · JPL
439886	2000 KQ_{1}	—	May 26, 2000	Socorro	LINEAR	·	2.2 km	MPC · JPL
439887	2000 MO_{6}	—	June 30, 2000	Haleakala	NEAT	·	1.4 km	MPC · JPL
439888	2000 NO_{1}	—	July 3, 2000	Kitt Peak	Spacewatch	·	1.0 km	MPC · JPL
439889	2000 PG_{5}	—	August 2, 2000	Socorro	LINEAR	AMO	590 m	MPC · JPL
439890	2000 QA_{133}	—	August 26, 2000	Socorro	LINEAR	·	1.1 km	MPC · JPL
439891	2000 RG_{84}	—	September 2, 2000	Anderson Mesa	LONEOS	·	1.8 km	MPC · JPL
439892	2000 SF_{14}	—	September 23, 2000	Socorro	LINEAR	·	1.4 km	MPC · JPL
439893	2000 SN_{184}	—	September 20, 2000	Haleakala	NEAT	·	1.1 km	MPC · JPL
439894	2000 SZ_{207}	—	September 24, 2000	Socorro	LINEAR	·	1.4 km	MPC · JPL
439895	2000 ST_{249}	—	September 24, 2000	Socorro	LINEAR	·	1.3 km	MPC · JPL
439896	2000 SK_{326}	—	September 29, 2000	Kitt Peak	Spacewatch	·	1.3 km	MPC · JPL
439897	2000 TU_{1}	—	October 2, 2000	Socorro	LINEAR	H	660 m	MPC · JPL
439898	2000 TG_{2}	—	October 4, 2000	Socorro	LINEAR	AMO	530 m	MPC · JPL
439899	2000 UA_{13}	—	October 3, 2000	Socorro	LINEAR	·	1.7 km	MPC · JPL
439900	2000 WB_{5}	—	November 19, 2000	Socorro	LINEAR	EUN	1.5 km	MPC · JPL

== 439901–440000 ==
back to top

Designation			Discovery			Properties		Ref
Permanent	Provisional	Named after	Date	Site	Discoverer(s)	Category	Diam.	Ref
439901	2000 WK_{24}	—	November 20, 2000	Socorro	LINEAR	·	1.1 km	MPC · JPL
439902	2000 WR_{45}	—	November 21, 2000	Socorro	LINEAR	fast	2.8 km	MPC · JPL
439903	2000 WR_{56}	—	November 21, 2000	Socorro	LINEAR	·	4.1 km	MPC · JPL
439904	2000 WO_{68}	—	November 2, 2000	Socorro	LINEAR	·	1.4 km	MPC · JPL
439905	2000 WY_{136}	—	November 20, 2000	Socorro	LINEAR	·	1.6 km	MPC · JPL
439906	2000 WB_{192}	—	October 1, 2000	Socorro	LINEAR	·	1.1 km	MPC · JPL
439907	2000 XH_{11}	—	December 1, 2000	Socorro	LINEAR	T_{j} (2.93)	6.6 km	MPC · JPL
439908	2000 XH_{47}	—	December 15, 2000	Socorro	LINEAR	AMO	470 m	MPC · JPL
439909	2000 YX_{133}	—	December 31, 2000	Kitt Peak	Spacewatch	H	600 m	MPC · JPL
439910	2001 AD_{44}	—	December 5, 2000	Socorro	LINEAR	H	600 m	MPC · JPL
439911	2001 DY_{8}	—	February 16, 2001	Socorro	LINEAR	H	640 m	MPC · JPL
439912	2001 FD_{87}	—	March 19, 2001	Socorro	LINEAR	·	880 m	MPC · JPL
439913	2001 FM_{119}	—	March 18, 2001	Socorro	LINEAR	PHO	1.1 km	MPC · JPL
439914	2001 OF_{30}	—	July 19, 2001	Palomar	NEAT	·	670 m	MPC · JPL
439915	2001 OT_{77}	—	July 26, 2001	Palomar	NEAT	·	710 m	MPC · JPL
439916	2001 PP_{32}	—	August 10, 2001	Palomar	NEAT	·	2.8 km	MPC · JPL
439917	2001 QQ_{69}	—	August 17, 2001	Socorro	LINEAR	·	2.3 km	MPC · JPL
439918	2001 QX_{115}	—	August 17, 2001	Socorro	LINEAR	·	2.3 km	MPC · JPL
439919	2001 QF_{132}	—	August 20, 2001	Socorro	LINEAR	·	680 m	MPC · JPL
439920	2001 QK_{171}	—	August 25, 2001	Socorro	LINEAR	PHO	930 m	MPC · JPL
439921	2001 QM_{172}	—	August 25, 2001	Socorro	LINEAR	·	930 m	MPC · JPL
439922	2001 QK_{211}	—	August 23, 2001	Anderson Mesa	LONEOS	·	670 m	MPC · JPL
439923	2001 QO_{216}	—	August 23, 2001	Anderson Mesa	LONEOS	·	790 m	MPC · JPL
439924	2001 QY_{225}	—	August 24, 2001	Anderson Mesa	LONEOS	·	1.9 km	MPC · JPL
439925	2001 QX_{255}	—	August 25, 2001	Socorro	LINEAR	·	2.5 km	MPC · JPL
439926	2001 QY_{264}	—	August 26, 2001	Haleakala	NEAT	·	770 m	MPC · JPL
439927	2001 QM_{290}	—	August 16, 2001	Socorro	LINEAR	·	600 m	MPC · JPL
439928	2001 RH_{12}	—	September 7, 2001	Socorro	LINEAR	·	590 m	MPC · JPL
439929	2001 RF_{24}	—	September 7, 2001	Socorro	LINEAR	·	650 m	MPC · JPL
439930	2001 RK_{29}	—	September 7, 2001	Socorro	LINEAR	·	1.7 km	MPC · JPL
439931	2001 RT_{46}	—	September 11, 2001	Socorro	LINEAR	·	1.3 km	MPC · JPL
439932	2001 RW_{59}	—	September 12, 2001	Socorro	LINEAR	·	860 m	MPC · JPL
439933	2001 RE_{129}	—	September 12, 2001	Socorro	LINEAR	·	2.3 km	MPC · JPL
439934	2001 RY_{145}	—	September 8, 2001	Socorro	LINEAR	DOR	2.3 km	MPC · JPL
439935	2001 SY_{34}	—	September 16, 2001	Socorro	LINEAR	·	1.0 km	MPC · JPL
439936	2001 SS_{37}	—	September 16, 2001	Socorro	LINEAR	·	840 m	MPC · JPL
439937	2001 SB_{38}	—	September 16, 2001	Socorro	LINEAR	·	870 m	MPC · JPL
439938	2001 SM_{38}	—	September 16, 2001	Socorro	LINEAR	·	2.1 km	MPC · JPL
439939	2001 SX_{77}	—	September 19, 2001	Socorro	LINEAR	·	790 m	MPC · JPL
439940	2001 SK_{121}	—	September 16, 2001	Socorro	LINEAR	·	1.6 km	MPC · JPL
439941	2001 SH_{127}	—	August 22, 2001	Kitt Peak	Spacewatch	·	1.8 km	MPC · JPL
439942	2001 SD_{132}	—	September 16, 2001	Socorro	LINEAR	·	720 m	MPC · JPL
439943	2001 SO_{152}	—	September 17, 2001	Socorro	LINEAR	·	1.1 km	MPC · JPL
439944	2001 SS_{174}	—	September 16, 2001	Socorro	LINEAR	·	2.2 km	MPC · JPL
439945	2001 SL_{225}	—	September 11, 2001	Kitt Peak	Spacewatch	·	2.1 km	MPC · JPL
439946	2001 SV_{246}	—	September 19, 2001	Socorro	LINEAR	·	940 m	MPC · JPL
439947	2001 SQ_{290}	—	September 23, 2001	Goodricke-Pigott	R. A. Tucker	·	780 m	MPC · JPL
439948	2001 SD_{300}	—	September 20, 2001	Socorro	LINEAR	·	1.7 km	MPC · JPL
439949	2001 SG_{318}	—	September 20, 2001	Socorro	LINEAR	·	710 m	MPC · JPL
439950	2001 SK_{323}	—	September 25, 2001	Socorro	LINEAR	·	1 km	MPC · JPL
439951	2001 SD_{338}	—	September 20, 2001	Socorro	LINEAR	·	720 m	MPC · JPL
439952	2001 SB_{339}	—	September 21, 2001	Anderson Mesa	LONEOS	·	1.9 km	MPC · JPL
439953	2001 TV_{54}	—	October 14, 2001	Socorro	LINEAR	·	570 m	MPC · JPL
439954	2001 TJ_{55}	—	October 14, 2001	Socorro	LINEAR	·	1.4 km	MPC · JPL
439955	2001 TV_{104}	—	October 13, 2001	Socorro	LINEAR	NYS	940 m	MPC · JPL
439956	2001 TN_{173}	—	October 14, 2001	Socorro	LINEAR	·	810 m	MPC · JPL
439957	2001 TX_{173}	—	October 14, 2001	Socorro	LINEAR	·	1.5 km	MPC · JPL
439958	2001 TD_{186}	—	October 14, 2001	Socorro	LINEAR	·	570 m	MPC · JPL
439959	2001 TX_{189}	—	October 14, 2001	Socorro	LINEAR	·	1.0 km	MPC · JPL
439960	2001 TO_{199}	—	October 11, 2001	Socorro	LINEAR	·	2.2 km	MPC · JPL
439961	2001 UM_{53}	—	October 17, 2001	Socorro	LINEAR	·	2.0 km	MPC · JPL
439962	2001 UT_{55}	—	September 19, 2001	Kitt Peak	Spacewatch	·	670 m	MPC · JPL
439963	2001 UF_{136}	—	October 22, 2001	Socorro	LINEAR	·	1.8 km	MPC · JPL
439964	2001 UC_{148}	—	October 23, 2001	Socorro	LINEAR	·	680 m	MPC · JPL
439965	2001 UF_{149}	—	October 23, 2001	Socorro	LINEAR	·	1.3 km	MPC · JPL
439966	2001 UO_{159}	—	October 23, 2001	Socorro	LINEAR	·	1.1 km	MPC · JPL
439967	2001 UY_{197}	—	October 19, 2001	Palomar	NEAT	AGN	1.2 km	MPC · JPL
439968	2001 UL_{229}	—	October 16, 2001	Palomar	NEAT	·	1.6 km	MPC · JPL
439969	2001 VO_{3}	—	November 11, 2001	Kitt Peak	Spacewatch	·	760 m	MPC · JPL
439970	2001 VG_{8}	—	November 9, 2001	Socorro	LINEAR	·	2.3 km	MPC · JPL
439971	2001 VM_{23}	—	November 9, 2001	Socorro	LINEAR	·	2.6 km	MPC · JPL
439972	2001 VX_{26}	—	November 9, 2001	Socorro	LINEAR	(2076)	890 m	MPC · JPL
439973	2001 VF_{60}	—	October 14, 2001	Socorro	LINEAR	·	1.4 km	MPC · JPL
439974	2001 WH_{15}	—	November 21, 2001	Socorro	LINEAR	·	1.6 km	MPC · JPL
439975	2001 WG_{21}	—	November 18, 2001	Socorro	LINEAR	·	880 m	MPC · JPL
439976	2001 WF_{32}	—	November 17, 2001	Socorro	LINEAR	·	910 m	MPC · JPL
439977	2001 WT_{53}	—	November 19, 2001	Socorro	LINEAR	·	790 m	MPC · JPL
439978	2001 WC_{65}	—	November 20, 2001	Socorro	LINEAR	·	980 m	MPC · JPL
439979	2001 WM_{65}	—	November 20, 2001	Socorro	LINEAR	·	980 m	MPC · JPL
439980	2001 WY_{67}	—	November 20, 2001	Socorro	LINEAR	NYS	890 m	MPC · JPL
439981	2001 WH_{68}	—	October 17, 2001	Kitt Peak	Spacewatch	·	910 m	MPC · JPL
439982	2001 WG_{87}	—	November 19, 2001	Socorro	LINEAR	·	830 m	MPC · JPL
439983	2001 WP_{91}	—	November 21, 2001	Socorro	LINEAR	·	1.7 km	MPC · JPL
439984	2001 XK_{51}	—	November 12, 2001	Kitt Peak	Spacewatch	·	1.3 km	MPC · JPL
439985	2001 XT_{75}	—	December 11, 2001	Socorro	LINEAR	·	2.4 km	MPC · JPL
439986	2001 XF_{110}	—	December 11, 2001	Socorro	LINEAR	·	1.1 km	MPC · JPL
439987	2001 XS_{146}	—	December 14, 2001	Socorro	LINEAR	3:2	6.4 km	MPC · JPL
439988	2001 XF_{169}	—	December 14, 2001	Socorro	LINEAR	·	1.1 km	MPC · JPL
439989	2001 XH_{230}	—	November 9, 2001	Socorro	LINEAR	·	1.6 km	MPC · JPL
439990	2001 XB_{235}	—	December 15, 2001	Socorro	LINEAR	·	1.9 km	MPC · JPL
439991	2001 YC_{16}	—	December 17, 2001	Socorro	LINEAR	·	1.1 km	MPC · JPL
439992	2001 YT_{36}	—	December 18, 2001	Socorro	LINEAR	·	2.3 km	MPC · JPL
439993	2001 YU_{92}	—	December 17, 2001	Kitt Peak	Spacewatch	V	670 m	MPC · JPL
439994	2002 AK_{2}	—	January 5, 2002	Socorro	LINEAR	·	1.6 km	MPC · JPL
439995	2002 AW_{73}	—	January 8, 2002	Socorro	LINEAR	3:2	5.0 km	MPC · JPL
439996	2002 AH_{88}	—	January 9, 2002	Socorro	LINEAR	·	1.2 km	MPC · JPL
439997	2002 AA_{109}	—	January 9, 2002	Socorro	LINEAR	EOS	2.7 km	MPC · JPL
439998	2002 CM_{4}	—	February 7, 2002	Socorro	LINEAR	·	1.8 km	MPC · JPL
439999	2002 CX_{11}	—	February 7, 2002	Socorro	LINEAR	·	1.7 km	MPC · JPL
440000	2002 CM_{88}	—	January 14, 2002	Kitt Peak	Spacewatch	·	1.5 km	MPC · JPL

back to top

== Meaning of names ==
As minor planet discoveries are confirmed, they are given a permanent number by the IAU's Minor Planet Center (MPC), and the discoverers can then submit names for them, following the IAU's naming conventions. The list below concerns those minor planets in the specified number-range that have received names, and explains the meanings of those names.

Official naming citations of newly named small Solar System bodies are approved and published in a bulletin by IAU's Working Group for Small Bodies Nomenclature (WGSBN). Before May 2021, citations were published in MPC's Minor Planet Circulars for many decades. Recent citations can also be found on the JPL Small-Body Database (SBDB). Until his death in 2016, German astronomer Lutz D. Schmadel compiled these citations into the Dictionary of Minor Planet Names (DMP) and regularly updated the collection.

Based on Paul Herget's The Names of the Minor Planets, Schmadel also researched the unclear origin of numerous asteroids, most of which had been named prior to World War II. This article incorporates text from this source, which is in the public domain: SBDB New namings may only be added to this list below after official publication as the preannouncement of names is condemned. The WGSBN publishes a comprehensive guideline for the naming rules of non-cometary small Solar System bodies.

Named minor planet	Provisional	This minor planet was named for...	Ref · Catalog
439718 Danielcervantes	2015 DW_{137}	Daniel Cervantes (born 1973) is an engineer who specializes in guidance and control systems for NASA spacecraft.	JPL · 439718
