= List of minor planets: 496001–497000 =

The following is a partial list of minor planets, running from minor-planet number 496001 through 497000, inclusive. The primary data for this and other partial lists is based on JPL's "Small-Body Orbital Elements" and data available from the Minor Planet Center. Critical list information is also provided by the MPC, unless otherwise specified from Lowell Observatory. A detailed description of the table's columns and additional sources are given on the main page including a complete list of every page in this series, and a statistical break-up on the dynamical classification of minor planets.

Also see the summary list of all named bodies in numerical and alphabetical order, and the corresponding naming citations for the number range of this particular list. New namings may only be added to this list after official publication, as the preannouncement of names is condemned by the Working Group for Small Bodies Nomenclature of the International Astronomical Union.

Near-Earth obj.	MBA (inner)	MBA (outer)	Centaur
Mars-crosser	MBA (middle)	Jupiter trojan	Trans-Neptunian obj.
Unclassified

== 496001–496100 ==
Designation			Discovery			Properties		Ref
Permanent	Provisional	Named after	Date	Site	Discoverer(s)	Category	Diam.	Ref
496001	2007 VR_{183}	—	November 8, 2007	Catalina	CSS	T_{j} (2.97) · AMO +1km	1.1 km	MPC · JPL
496002	2007 VF_{223}	—	October 9, 2007	Kitt Peak	Spacewatch	PHO	600 m	MPC · JPL
496003	2007 VN_{233}	—	October 20, 2007	Mount Lemmon	Mount Lemmon Survey	·	2.8 km	MPC · JPL
496004	2007 XS	—	November 8, 2007	Catalina	CSS	H	590 m	MPC · JPL
496005	2007 XJ_{16}	—	December 5, 2007	Kitt Peak	Spacewatch	AMO · APO · PHA	540 m	MPC · JPL
496006	2007 XJ_{52}	—	December 6, 2007	Kitt Peak	Spacewatch	TIR	2.6 km	MPC · JPL
496007	2007 XS_{56}	—	September 27, 2007	Mount Lemmon	Mount Lemmon Survey	·	4.3 km	MPC · JPL
496008	2007 XQ_{59}	—	December 15, 2007	Socorro	LINEAR	EUP	3.1 km	MPC · JPL
496009	2007 YD_{69}	—	November 5, 2007	Kitt Peak	Spacewatch	·	770 m	MPC · JPL
496010	2007 YB_{73}	—	December 20, 2007	Mount Lemmon	Mount Lemmon Survey	H	700 m	MPC · JPL
496011	2008 AK_{49}	—	January 1, 2008	Kitt Peak	Spacewatch	·	1.7 km	MPC · JPL
496012	2008 DK_{61}	—	February 28, 2008	Mount Lemmon	Mount Lemmon Survey	·	3.7 km	MPC · JPL
496013	2008 EL_{6}	—	March 5, 2008	Socorro	LINEAR	APO · PHA	220 m	MPC · JPL
496014	2008 EC_{57}	—	February 2, 2008	Kitt Peak	Spacewatch	·	1.2 km	MPC · JPL
496015	2008 HF_{53}	—	April 6, 2008	Mount Lemmon	Mount Lemmon Survey	·	1.3 km	MPC · JPL
496016	2008 HD_{70}	—	April 7, 2008	Catalina	CSS	·	2.2 km	MPC · JPL
496017	2008 KG_{32}	—	January 27, 2007	Mount Lemmon	Mount Lemmon Survey	·	1.5 km	MPC · JPL
496018	2008 NU	—	July 1, 2008	Catalina	CSS	AMO +1km	1.1 km	MPC · JPL
496019	2008 ON_{11}	—	July 31, 2008	La Sagra	OAM	·	2.3 km	MPC · JPL
496020	2008 PP_{15}	—	August 10, 2008	Hibiscus	S. F. Hönig, Teamo, N.	·	1.7 km	MPC · JPL
496021	2008 QC_{2}	—	August 24, 2008	La Sagra	OAM	·	800 m	MPC · JPL
496022	2008 QV_{25}	—	July 8, 2008	Mount Lemmon	Mount Lemmon Survey	·	3.0 km	MPC · JPL
496023	2008 RH_{66}	—	September 4, 2008	Kitt Peak	Spacewatch	·	2.9 km	MPC · JPL
496024	2008 RT_{104}	—	September 6, 2008	Catalina	CSS	·	1.3 km	MPC · JPL
496025	2008 RN_{116}	—	September 7, 2008	Mount Lemmon	Mount Lemmon Survey	·	1.2 km	MPC · JPL
496026	2008 RV_{121}	—	September 3, 2008	Kitt Peak	Spacewatch	·	1.8 km	MPC · JPL
496027	2008 RH_{131}	—	September 9, 2008	Mount Lemmon	Mount Lemmon Survey	·	1.6 km	MPC · JPL
496028	2008 SC_{9}	—	August 24, 2008	La Sagra	OAM	·	2.2 km	MPC · JPL
496029	2008 SL_{60}	—	September 20, 2008	Mount Lemmon	Mount Lemmon Survey	·	2.9 km	MPC · JPL
496030	2008 SU_{181}	—	September 24, 2008	Mount Lemmon	Mount Lemmon Survey	·	1.2 km	MPC · JPL
496031	2008 SR_{274}	—	September 21, 2008	Kitt Peak	Spacewatch	L4	8.3 km	MPC · JPL
496032	2008 SS_{294}	—	September 22, 2008	Catalina	CSS	·	2.1 km	MPC · JPL
496033	2008 TH_{49}	—	October 2, 2008	Kitt Peak	Spacewatch	·	1.5 km	MPC · JPL
496034	2008 TG_{107}	—	September 23, 2008	Mount Lemmon	Mount Lemmon Survey	KOR	1.2 km	MPC · JPL
496035	2008 UQ_{102}	—	October 9, 2008	Kitt Peak	Spacewatch	·	2.3 km	MPC · JPL
496036	2008 UK_{121}	—	October 22, 2008	Kitt Peak	Spacewatch	·	2.7 km	MPC · JPL
496037	2008 US_{135}	—	September 22, 2008	Mount Lemmon	Mount Lemmon Survey	·	570 m	MPC · JPL
496038	2008 UY_{195}	—	October 26, 2008	Kitt Peak	Spacewatch	(1118)	4.9 km	MPC · JPL
496039	2008 UV_{329}	—	October 23, 2008	Kitt Peak	Spacewatch	·	2.3 km	MPC · JPL
496040	2008 UM_{345}	—	October 31, 2008	Catalina	CSS	·	1.9 km	MPC · JPL
496041	2008 US_{366}	—	October 22, 2008	Kitt Peak	Spacewatch	·	4.2 km	MPC · JPL
496042	2008 VP_{73}	—	November 6, 2008	Kitt Peak	Spacewatch	·	3.8 km	MPC · JPL
496043	2008 WP_{7}	—	October 1, 2008	Mount Lemmon	Mount Lemmon Survey	·	1.9 km	MPC · JPL
496044	2008 WM_{41}	—	November 17, 2008	Kitt Peak	Spacewatch	T_{j} (2.99)	5.5 km	MPC · JPL
496045	2008 WA_{64}	—	November 1, 2008	Catalina	CSS	·	2.9 km	MPC · JPL
496046	2008 WN_{106}	—	October 20, 2008	Mount Lemmon	Mount Lemmon Survey	·	2.1 km	MPC · JPL
496047	2008 WZ_{127}	—	November 21, 2008	Kitt Peak	Spacewatch	EOS	1.6 km	MPC · JPL
496048	2008 XU	—	October 4, 2008	Mount Lemmon	Mount Lemmon Survey	·	2.0 km	MPC · JPL
496049	2008 YE_{28}	—	December 29, 2008	Mayhill	Lowe, A.	·	4.2 km	MPC · JPL
496050	2009 AZ_{24}	—	January 3, 2009	Kitt Peak	Spacewatch	H	400 m	MPC · JPL
496051	2009 AG_{33}	—	January 1, 2009	Kitt Peak	Spacewatch	T_{j} (2.99)	3.4 km	MPC · JPL
496052	2009 AK_{33}	—	January 15, 2009	Kitt Peak	Spacewatch	·	930 m	MPC · JPL
496053	2009 AM_{33}	—	January 15, 2009	Kitt Peak	Spacewatch	·	850 m	MPC · JPL
496054	2009 BT_{4}	—	October 24, 2008	Mount Lemmon	Mount Lemmon Survey	·	630 m	MPC · JPL
496055	2009 BU_{131}	—	January 20, 2009	Catalina	CSS	·	2.1 km	MPC · JPL
496056	2009 BH_{189}	—	December 21, 2008	Catalina	CSS	·	2.2 km	MPC · JPL
496057	2009 CQ_{24}	—	February 1, 2009	Kitt Peak	Spacewatch	VER	2.0 km	MPC · JPL
496058	2009 DE_{107}	—	February 28, 2009	Kitt Peak	Spacewatch	V	630 m	MPC · JPL
496059	2009 DL_{109}	—	February 26, 2009	Catalina	CSS	·	1.2 km	MPC · JPL
496060	2009 DZ_{121}	—	February 19, 2009	Kitt Peak	Spacewatch	·	1.0 km	MPC · JPL
496061	2009 GX_{3}	—	April 4, 2009	Cerro Burek	Burek, Cerro	NYS	1.1 km	MPC · JPL
496062	2009 JC_{6}	—	May 13, 2009	Kitt Peak	Spacewatch	·	1.4 km	MPC · JPL
496063	2009 OY_{23}	—	July 29, 2009	Kitt Peak	Spacewatch	·	1.5 km	MPC · JPL
496064	2009 OZ_{23}	—	July 29, 2009	Kitt Peak	Spacewatch	·	1.1 km	MPC · JPL
496065	2009 PT_{1}	—	July 27, 2009	Catalina	CSS	·	1.9 km	MPC · JPL
496066	2009 PK_{16}	—	August 15, 2009	Kitt Peak	Spacewatch	·	1.8 km	MPC · JPL
496067	2009 QR_{41}	—	August 22, 2009	La Sagra	OAM	·	1.5 km	MPC · JPL
496068	2009 RC	—	July 31, 2009	Catalina	CSS	JUN	1.1 km	MPC · JPL
496069	2009 RT_{18}	—	September 13, 2009	Purple Mountain	PMO NEO Survey Program	·	1.3 km	MPC · JPL
496070	2009 RH_{28}	—	August 28, 2009	Catalina	CSS	·	1.6 km	MPC · JPL
496071	2009 RD_{30}	—	September 14, 2009	Kitt Peak	Spacewatch	(5)	670 m	MPC · JPL
496072	2009 RP_{47}	—	September 15, 2009	Kitt Peak	Spacewatch	·	1.7 km	MPC · JPL
496073	2009 RV_{47}	—	September 15, 2009	Kitt Peak	Spacewatch	L4	8.9 km	MPC · JPL
496074	2009 RS_{50}	—	September 15, 2009	Kitt Peak	Spacewatch	·	1.1 km	MPC · JPL
496075	2009 RE_{56}	—	April 4, 2003	Kitt Peak	Spacewatch	L4	9.5 km	MPC · JPL
496076	2009 SX_{13}	—	September 17, 2009	La Sagra	OAM	·	1.0 km	MPC · JPL
496077	2009 SV_{15}	—	September 17, 2009	Catalina	CSS	·	1.4 km	MPC · JPL
496078	2009 SU_{23}	—	September 16, 2009	Kitt Peak	Spacewatch	·	1.2 km	MPC · JPL
496079	2009 SD_{50}	—	September 17, 2009	Kitt Peak	Spacewatch	·	1.6 km	MPC · JPL
496080	2009 SB_{56}	—	September 17, 2009	Kitt Peak	Spacewatch	·	1.4 km	MPC · JPL
496081	2009 SG_{103}	—	September 25, 2009	La Sagra	OAM	·	6.7 km	MPC · JPL
496082	2009 SD_{112}	—	September 18, 2009	Kitt Peak	Spacewatch	EUN	890 m	MPC · JPL
496083	2009 SD_{130}	—	September 18, 2009	Kitt Peak	Spacewatch	·	2.0 km	MPC · JPL
496084	2009 SB_{134}	—	September 18, 2009	Kitt Peak	Spacewatch	AGN	1.3 km	MPC · JPL
496085	2009 SF_{142}	—	September 19, 2009	Kitt Peak	Spacewatch	·	1.4 km	MPC · JPL
496086	2009 SC_{150}	—	September 20, 2009	Kitt Peak	Spacewatch	·	1.7 km	MPC · JPL
496087	2009 ST_{162}	—	August 28, 2009	La Sagra	OAM	·	1.3 km	MPC · JPL
496088	2009 SF_{170}	—	August 27, 2009	Kitt Peak	Spacewatch	·	1.8 km	MPC · JPL
496089	2009 SH_{194}	—	September 22, 2009	Kitt Peak	Spacewatch	·	1.7 km	MPC · JPL
496090	2009 SW_{220}	—	September 24, 2009	La Sagra	OAM	·	1.4 km	MPC · JPL
496091	2009 SU_{255}	—	September 21, 2009	Catalina	CSS	·	1.9 km	MPC · JPL
496092	2009 SX_{290}	—	September 25, 2009	Kitt Peak	Spacewatch	·	1.4 km	MPC · JPL
496093	2009 SE_{293}	—	September 19, 2009	Mount Lemmon	Mount Lemmon Survey	·	1.1 km	MPC · JPL
496094	2009 SL_{327}	—	August 19, 2009	Catalina	CSS	·	1.8 km	MPC · JPL
496095	2009 TZ_{6}	—	October 12, 2009	La Sagra	OAM	·	1.9 km	MPC · JPL
496096	2009 TS_{14}	—	September 14, 2009	Socorro	LINEAR	·	1.7 km	MPC · JPL
496097	2009 TX_{44}	—	October 9, 2009	Catalina	CSS	EUN	1.0 km	MPC · JPL
496098	2009 UX_{59}	—	October 26, 2009	Mount Lemmon	Mount Lemmon Survey	·	2.2 km	MPC · JPL
496099	2009 UQ_{111}	—	October 23, 2009	Mount Lemmon	Mount Lemmon Survey	·	4.2 km	MPC · JPL
496100	2009 UE_{116}	—	December 13, 1996	Kitt Peak	Spacewatch	·	1.3 km	MPC · JPL

== 496101–496200 ==
back to top

Designation			Discovery			Properties		Ref
Permanent	Provisional	Named after	Date	Site	Discoverer(s)	Category	Diam.	Ref
496101	2009 UW_{129}	—	October 27, 2009	La Sagra	OAM	·	2.3 km	MPC · JPL
496102	2009 UP_{133}	—	October 22, 2009	Mount Lemmon	Mount Lemmon Survey	·	1.0 km	MPC · JPL
496103	2009 VA_{11}	—	November 8, 2009	Mount Lemmon	Mount Lemmon Survey	·	2.0 km	MPC · JPL
496104	2009 VR_{57}	—	November 12, 2009	La Sagra	OAM	·	1.8 km	MPC · JPL
496105	2009 VX_{70}	—	November 9, 2009	Kitt Peak	Spacewatch	·	1.9 km	MPC · JPL
496106	2009 VF_{81}	—	October 12, 2009	Mount Lemmon	Mount Lemmon Survey	·	1.9 km	MPC · JPL
496107	2009 WH	—	November 15, 2009	Catalina	CSS	(5)	1.2 km	MPC · JPL
496108	2009 WR_{23}	—	October 26, 2009	Kitt Peak	Spacewatch	·	1.8 km	MPC · JPL
496109	2009 WY_{44}	—	October 25, 2009	Kitt Peak	Spacewatch	·	1.9 km	MPC · JPL
496110	2009 WK_{82}	—	November 11, 2009	Kitt Peak	Spacewatch	·	2.2 km	MPC · JPL
496111	2009 WU_{94}	—	October 18, 2009	La Sagra	OAM	·	2.2 km	MPC · JPL
496112	2009 WE_{160}	—	November 21, 2009	Kitt Peak	Spacewatch	·	570 m	MPC · JPL
496113	2009 WN_{163}	—	November 21, 2009	Kitt Peak	Spacewatch	·	1.9 km	MPC · JPL
496114	2009 WF_{185}	—	November 17, 2009	Mount Lemmon	Mount Lemmon Survey	·	2.1 km	MPC · JPL
496115	2009 WF_{242}	—	November 11, 2009	Kitt Peak	Spacewatch	MRX	690 m	MPC · JPL
496116	2009 WA_{263}	—	October 10, 2004	Socorro	LINEAR	·	2.1 km	MPC · JPL
496117	2009 XZ_{8}	—	November 9, 2009	Kitt Peak	Spacewatch	·	1.8 km	MPC · JPL
496118	2009 YX_{15}	—	December 19, 2009	Mount Lemmon	Mount Lemmon Survey	·	3.2 km	MPC · JPL
496119	2010 AH_{69}	—	January 12, 2010	Catalina	CSS	BRA	1.4 km	MPC · JPL
496120	2010 AS_{115}	—	August 29, 2006	Anderson Mesa	LONEOS	·	5.9 km	MPC · JPL
496121	2010 CG_{182}	—	February 14, 2010	Haleakala	Pan-STARRS 1	·	2.6 km	MPC · JPL
496122	2010 CZ_{182}	—	November 1, 2008	Mount Lemmon	Mount Lemmon Survey	·	2.6 km	MPC · JPL
496123	2010 CJ_{186}	—	May 9, 2010	Mount Lemmon	Mount Lemmon Survey	·	4.6 km	MPC · JPL
496124	2010 EK_{12}	—	March 8, 2010	Siding Spring	SSS	AMO +1km	970 m	MPC · JPL
496125	2010 FF_{92}	—	March 21, 2010	Mount Lemmon	Mount Lemmon Survey	·	2.9 km	MPC · JPL
496126	2010 GQ_{108}	—	April 8, 2010	Kitt Peak	Spacewatch	·	580 m	MPC · JPL
496127	2010 GN_{145}	—	March 19, 2010	Mount Lemmon	Mount Lemmon Survey	·	780 m	MPC · JPL
496128	2010 LJ_{10}	—	June 6, 2010	WISE	WISE	·	1.2 km	MPC · JPL
496129	2010 MZ_{99}	—	June 29, 2010	WISE	WISE	·	3.0 km	MPC · JPL
496130	2010 NB_{67}	—	October 15, 1999	Socorro	LINEAR	·	1.6 km	MPC · JPL
496131	2010 OF_{35}	—	January 9, 1999	Kitt Peak	Spacewatch	·	2.0 km	MPC · JPL
496132	2010 PW_{23}	—	July 17, 2010	La Sagra	OAM	·	770 m	MPC · JPL
496133	2010 QN_{4}	—	October 16, 2006	Catalina	CSS	·	1.8 km	MPC · JPL
496134	2010 RS_{27}	—	August 13, 2010	Kitt Peak	Spacewatch	NYS	880 m	MPC · JPL
496135	2010 RY_{39}	—	November 7, 2007	Kitt Peak	Spacewatch	·	820 m	MPC · JPL
496136	2010 RP_{61}	—	September 6, 2010	Kitt Peak	Spacewatch	·	1.1 km	MPC · JPL
496137	2010 RU_{63}	—	September 6, 2010	La Sagra	OAM	NYS	770 m	MPC · JPL
496138	2010 RN_{73}	—	November 18, 2003	Kitt Peak	Spacewatch	·	860 m	MPC · JPL
496139	2010 RX_{80}	—	May 25, 2006	Mount Lemmon	Mount Lemmon Survey	MAS	760 m	MPC · JPL
496140	2010 RY_{90}	—	December 31, 2007	Mount Lemmon	Mount Lemmon Survey	·	970 m	MPC · JPL
496141	2010 RY_{109}	—	November 20, 2003	Kitt Peak	Spacewatch	·	880 m	MPC · JPL
496142	2010 RM_{125}	—	August 7, 1999	Kitt Peak	Spacewatch	·	830 m	MPC · JPL
496143	2010 RC_{165}	—	September 26, 1995	Kitt Peak	Spacewatch	·	1.0 km	MPC · JPL
496144	2010 RM_{165}	—	September 9, 2010	La Sagra	OAM	·	590 m	MPC · JPL
496145	2010 RF_{179}	—	September 11, 2010	La Sagra	OAM	·	1.1 km	MPC · JPL
496146	2010 SO_{10}	—	June 14, 2010	WISE	WISE	·	1.0 km	MPC · JPL
496147	2010 SC_{18}	—	September 2, 2010	Mount Lemmon	Mount Lemmon Survey	VER	2.2 km	MPC · JPL
496148	2010 SZ_{19}	—	September 9, 2010	Kitt Peak	Spacewatch	NYS	900 m	MPC · JPL
496149	2010 SA_{33}	—	November 11, 2007	Mount Lemmon	Mount Lemmon Survey	NYS	1.3 km	MPC · JPL
496150	2010 TR_{74}	—	September 18, 2010	Kitt Peak	Spacewatch	·	2.3 km	MPC · JPL
496151	2010 TJ_{76}	—	March 17, 2009	Kitt Peak	Spacewatch	H	500 m	MPC · JPL
496152	2010 TN_{120}	—	September 30, 2010	Mount Lemmon	Mount Lemmon Survey	PHO	780 m	MPC · JPL
496153	2010 UC_{25}	—	October 28, 2010	Kitt Peak	Spacewatch	·	1.3 km	MPC · JPL
496154	2010 UM_{67}	—	October 12, 2010	Mount Lemmon	Mount Lemmon Survey	·	1.2 km	MPC · JPL
496155	2010 UR_{92}	—	December 1, 2006	Catalina	CSS	BAR	1.6 km	MPC · JPL
496156	2010 VO_{11}	—	November 3, 2010	Kitt Peak	Spacewatch	BAR	1.6 km	MPC · JPL
496157	2010 VC_{78}	—	November 23, 2006	Mount Lemmon	Mount Lemmon Survey	BRU	1.9 km	MPC · JPL
496158	2010 VJ_{164}	—	October 13, 2010	Mount Lemmon	Mount Lemmon Survey	EUN	1.1 km	MPC · JPL
496159	2010 VG_{189}	—	November 25, 2006	Kitt Peak	Spacewatch	·	800 m	MPC · JPL
496160	2010 VE_{198}	—	December 16, 2006	Kitt Peak	Spacewatch	(5)	970 m	MPC · JPL
496161	2010 VJ_{208}	—	November 23, 2006	Kitt Peak	Spacewatch	(5)	710 m	MPC · JPL
496162	2010 VZ_{210}	—	October 9, 2010	Mount Lemmon	Mount Lemmon Survey	(22805)	2.8 km	MPC · JPL
496163	2010 WM_{19}	—	October 1, 2003	Kitt Peak	Spacewatch	·	670 m	MPC · JPL
496164	2010 WL_{40}	—	June 18, 2006	Kitt Peak	Spacewatch	·	760 m	MPC · JPL
496165	2010 XW_{3}	—	October 17, 2006	Kitt Peak	Spacewatch	PHO	880 m	MPC · JPL
496166	2010 XW_{18}	—	November 29, 1997	Kitt Peak	Spacewatch	L4	8.2 km	MPC · JPL
496167	2010 XA_{76}	—	November 2, 2010	Kitt Peak	Spacewatch	PHO	940 m	MPC · JPL
496168	2011 AC_{7}	—	December 13, 2010	Kitt Peak	Spacewatch	L4	7.7 km	MPC · JPL
496169	2011 AU_{39}	—	December 5, 2010	Mount Lemmon	Mount Lemmon Survey	H	500 m	MPC · JPL
496170	2011 AD_{45}	—	December 30, 2005	Kitt Peak	Spacewatch	·	2.4 km	MPC · JPL
496171	2011 AU_{74}	—	November 5, 2010	Kitt Peak	Spacewatch	H	670 m	MPC · JPL
496172	2011 BG_{109}	—	February 10, 2011	Mount Lemmon	Mount Lemmon Survey	AGN	920 m	MPC · JPL
496173	2011 BT_{120}	—	February 8, 2011	Mount Lemmon	Mount Lemmon Survey	·	1.5 km	MPC · JPL
496174	2011 CQ_{4}	—	February 1, 2011	Haleakala	Pan-STARRS 1	APO · slow	660 m	MPC · JPL
496175	2011 CK_{23}	—	January 28, 2011	Mount Lemmon	Mount Lemmon Survey	·	2.2 km	MPC · JPL
496176	2011 CR_{41}	—	February 9, 2011	Bergisch Gladbach	W. Bickel	·	1.8 km	MPC · JPL
496177	2011 CA_{66}	—	December 13, 2010	Catalina	CSS	T_{j} (2.94)	3.8 km	MPC · JPL
496178	2011 CN_{78}	—	October 23, 2009	Mount Lemmon	Mount Lemmon Survey	AGN	870 m	MPC · JPL
496179	2011 CO_{105}	—	January 31, 2006	Kitt Peak	Spacewatch	BRA	1.0 km	MPC · JPL
496180	2011 CQ_{110}	—	February 26, 2011	Mount Lemmon	Mount Lemmon Survey	·	1.6 km	MPC · JPL
496181	2011 CM_{112}	—	February 10, 2011	Mount Lemmon	Mount Lemmon Survey	·	1.6 km	MPC · JPL
496182	2011 CZ_{115}	—	January 22, 2006	Mount Lemmon	Mount Lemmon Survey	·	1.6 km	MPC · JPL
496183	2011 DG_{3}	—	February 12, 2011	Mount Lemmon	Mount Lemmon Survey	·	2.5 km	MPC · JPL
496184	2011 DC_{15}	—	February 8, 2011	Mount Lemmon	Mount Lemmon Survey	·	1.5 km	MPC · JPL
496185	2011 EB_{9}	—	December 1, 2005	Kitt Peak	Spacewatch	(12739)	1.6 km	MPC · JPL
496186	2011 FO_{12}	—	March 26, 2011	Kitt Peak	Spacewatch	·	2.1 km	MPC · JPL
496187	2011 FZ_{47}	—	March 29, 2000	Kitt Peak	Spacewatch	·	2.0 km	MPC · JPL
496188	2011 GQ_{17}	—	February 1, 2005	Kitt Peak	Spacewatch	·	5.3 km	MPC · JPL
496189	2011 GO_{85}	—	October 7, 2007	Mount Lemmon	Mount Lemmon Survey	TIR	2.4 km	MPC · JPL
496190	2011 HW_{4}	—	April 11, 2011	Mount Lemmon	Mount Lemmon Survey	EOS	1.7 km	MPC · JPL
496191	2011 HH_{31}	—	April 3, 2011	Haleakala	Pan-STARRS 1	·	2.0 km	MPC · JPL
496192	2011 HK_{36}	—	April 26, 2011	Kitt Peak	Spacewatch	EOS	2.2 km	MPC · JPL
496193	2011 HX_{39}	—	May 2, 2006	Mount Lemmon	Mount Lemmon Survey	·	1.7 km	MPC · JPL
496194	2011 HH_{52}	—	April 30, 2011	Haleakala	Pan-STARRS 1	·	2.0 km	MPC · JPL
496195	2011 HF_{54}	—	January 12, 2010	Mount Lemmon	Mount Lemmon Survey	EOS	2.2 km	MPC · JPL
496196	2011 HN_{58}	—	April 28, 2011	Haleakala	Pan-STARRS 1	·	2.9 km	MPC · JPL
496197	2011 HK_{59}	—	April 30, 2011	Haleakala	Pan-STARRS 1	·	2.3 km	MPC · JPL
496198	2011 HP_{99}	—	April 30, 2011	Kitt Peak	Spacewatch	·	3.1 km	MPC · JPL
496199	2011 JB_{4}	—	December 31, 2008	Mount Lemmon	Mount Lemmon Survey	EOS	1.9 km	MPC · JPL
496200	2011 JM_{10}	—	April 27, 2011	Kitt Peak	Spacewatch	·	1.7 km	MPC · JPL

== 496201–496300 ==
back to top

Designation			Discovery			Properties		Ref
Permanent	Provisional	Named after	Date	Site	Discoverer(s)	Category	Diam.	Ref
496201	2011 JO_{18}	—	May 1, 2011	Haleakala	Pan-STARRS 1	·	3.2 km	MPC · JPL
496202	2011 JJ_{21}	—	April 30, 2011	Haleakala	Pan-STARRS 1	·	2.6 km	MPC · JPL
496203	2011 KJ_{8}	—	May 21, 2011	Haleakala	Pan-STARRS 1	EOS	2.4 km	MPC · JPL
496204	2011 SF_{4}	—	September 2, 2011	Haleakala	Pan-STARRS 1	·	1.5 km	MPC · JPL
496205	2011 SW_{73}	—	September 4, 2011	Haleakala	Pan-STARRS 1	·	2.7 km	MPC · JPL
496206	2011 SW_{174}	—	September 8, 2011	Kitt Peak	Spacewatch	EOS	1.8 km	MPC · JPL
496207	2011 SZ_{183}	—	October 8, 2007	Kitt Peak	Spacewatch	·	690 m	MPC · JPL
496208	2011 SE_{207}	—	June 14, 2011	Mount Lemmon	Mount Lemmon Survey	PHO	630 m	MPC · JPL
496209	2011 SQ_{269}	—	September 4, 2011	Haleakala	Pan-STARRS 1	·	2.3 km	MPC · JPL
496210	2011 UY_{8}	—	November 15, 1998	Kitt Peak	Spacewatch	·	440 m	MPC · JPL
496211	2011 UZ_{82}	—	October 19, 2011	Kitt Peak	Spacewatch	·	640 m	MPC · JPL
496212	2011 UT_{142}	—	December 31, 2008	Kitt Peak	Spacewatch	·	430 m	MPC · JPL
496213	2011 UR_{201}	—	August 21, 2006	Kitt Peak	Spacewatch	WIT	740 m	MPC · JPL
496214	2011 US_{246}	—	September 23, 2011	Mount Lemmon	Mount Lemmon Survey	·	600 m	MPC · JPL
496215	2011 UA_{299}	—	September 23, 2011	Mount Lemmon	Mount Lemmon Survey	·	710 m	MPC · JPL
496216	2011 WH_{2}	—	October 22, 2011	Kitt Peak	Spacewatch	·	2.3 km	MPC · JPL
496217	2011 WZ_{7}	—	November 19, 2006	Kitt Peak	Spacewatch	·	1.6 km	MPC · JPL
496218	2011 WV_{8}	—	December 15, 2006	Kitt Peak	Spacewatch	·	1.7 km	MPC · JPL
496219	2011 WR_{56}	—	October 26, 2011	Haleakala	Pan-STARRS 1	·	540 m	MPC · JPL
496220	2011 WW_{58}	—	January 18, 2008	Kitt Peak	Spacewatch	·	1.3 km	MPC · JPL
496221	2011 WW_{83}	—	April 9, 2010	Mount Lemmon	Mount Lemmon Survey	·	660 m	MPC · JPL
496222	2011 WQ_{89}	—	November 25, 2011	Haleakala	Pan-STARRS 1	·	560 m	MPC · JPL
496223	2011 WL_{104}	—	August 22, 2004	Kitt Peak	Spacewatch	·	540 m	MPC · JPL
496224	2011 WU_{109}	—	October 26, 2011	Haleakala	Pan-STARRS 1	(2076)	760 m	MPC · JPL
496225	2011 WX_{109}	—	October 26, 2011	Haleakala	Pan-STARRS 1	·	1.8 km	MPC · JPL
496226	2012 BC_{3}	—	December 25, 2011	Mount Lemmon	Mount Lemmon Survey	·	1.6 km	MPC · JPL
496227	2012 BY_{30}	—	January 19, 2012	Mount Lemmon	Mount Lemmon Survey	V	580 m	MPC · JPL
496228	2012 BS_{121}	—	May 3, 2008	Kitt Peak	Spacewatch	EOS	1.7 km	MPC · JPL
496229	2012 BB_{147}	—	January 27, 2012	Mount Lemmon	Mount Lemmon Survey	ERI	1.2 km	MPC · JPL
496230	2012 CL_{2}	—	February 1, 2012	Mount Lemmon	Mount Lemmon Survey	AMO	770 m	MPC · JPL
496231	2012 CJ_{11}	—	February 3, 2012	Haleakala	Pan-STARRS 1	NYS	800 m	MPC · JPL
496232	2012 CL_{32}	—	February 14, 2012	Haleakala	Pan-STARRS 1	·	960 m	MPC · JPL
496233	2012 CA_{54}	—	March 4, 2008	Mount Lemmon	Mount Lemmon Survey	HNS	1.0 km	MPC · JPL
496234	2012 DF_{20}	—	February 18, 2012	Catalina	CSS	·	2.0 km	MPC · JPL
496235	2012 DH_{34}	—	February 23, 2012	Kitt Peak	Spacewatch	·	1.8 km	MPC · JPL
496236	2012 FS_{40}	—	March 14, 2012	Catalina	CSS	·	2.2 km	MPC · JPL
496237	2012 FP_{53}	—	September 16, 2009	Mount Lemmon	Mount Lemmon Survey	·	1.7 km	MPC · JPL
496238	2012 FQ_{63}	—	October 8, 2004	Kitt Peak	Spacewatch	THM	1.7 km	MPC · JPL
496239	2012 FR_{72}	—	December 6, 2011	Haleakala	Pan-STARRS 1	·	1.9 km	MPC · JPL
496240	2012 FD_{76}	—	March 17, 2012	Catalina	CSS	JUN	1.2 km	MPC · JPL
496241	2012 GM_{18}	—	February 23, 2012	Mount Lemmon	Mount Lemmon Survey	·	1.6 km	MPC · JPL
496242	2012 GQ_{22}	—	April 15, 2012	Haleakala	Pan-STARRS 1	EUN	1.1 km	MPC · JPL
496243	2012 GX_{36}	—	October 28, 2005	Kitt Peak	Spacewatch	·	1.6 km	MPC · JPL
496244	2012 HK_{26}	—	April 19, 2012	Mount Lemmon	Mount Lemmon Survey	·	1.4 km	MPC · JPL
496245	2012 HZ_{31}	—	April 15, 2012	Haleakala	Pan-STARRS 1	·	2.1 km	MPC · JPL
496246	2012 HZ_{66}	—	January 30, 2012	Haleakala	Pan-STARRS 1	EUN	1.1 km	MPC · JPL
496247	2012 HV_{68}	—	April 15, 2012	Haleakala	Pan-STARRS 1	HNS	1.3 km	MPC · JPL
496248	2012 HH_{72}	—	April 24, 2012	Haleakala	Pan-STARRS 1	·	1.8 km	MPC · JPL
496249	2012 HW_{74}	—	April 27, 2012	Haleakala	Pan-STARRS 1	·	1.1 km	MPC · JPL
496250	2012 HG_{82}	—	March 27, 2012	Kitt Peak	Spacewatch	·	2.1 km	MPC · JPL
496251	2012 JP	—	May 9, 2012	Haleakala	Pan-STARRS 1	·	3.0 km	MPC · JPL
496252	2012 JG_{55}	—	February 25, 2011	Mount Lemmon	Mount Lemmon Survey	KOR	1.2 km	MPC · JPL
496253	2012 KY_{4}	—	October 23, 2009	Mount Lemmon	Mount Lemmon Survey	·	1.6 km	MPC · JPL
496254	2012 LE_{15}	—	February 7, 2011	Mount Lemmon	Mount Lemmon Survey	·	1.7 km	MPC · JPL
496255	2012 MW_{12}	—	May 17, 2012	Mount Lemmon	Mount Lemmon Survey	TIR	2.9 km	MPC · JPL
496256	2012 OA	—	December 1, 2008	Kitt Peak	Spacewatch	VER	2.6 km	MPC · JPL
496257	2012 OO_{1}	—	May 19, 2012	Mount Lemmon	Mount Lemmon Survey	H	430 m	MPC · JPL
496258	2012 OE_{4}	—	October 30, 2007	Mount Lemmon	Mount Lemmon Survey	HYG	2.3 km	MPC · JPL
496259	2012 PB	—	February 17, 2004	Kitt Peak	Spacewatch	H	420 m	MPC · JPL
496260	2012 PK_{16}	—	August 6, 2012	Haleakala	Pan-STARRS 1	EOS	2.0 km	MPC · JPL
496261	2012 PO_{18}	—	August 13, 2012	Haleakala	Pan-STARRS 1	TEL	1.6 km	MPC · JPL
496262	2012 PT_{40}	—	April 3, 2011	Haleakala	Pan-STARRS 1	·	1.7 km	MPC · JPL
496263	2012 PA_{43}	—	August 14, 2012	Kitt Peak	Spacewatch	·	3.4 km	MPC · JPL
496264	2012 QX_{41}	—	August 24, 2012	Catalina	CSS	·	2.8 km	MPC · JPL
496265	2012 RE_{3}	—	May 31, 2011	Kitt Peak	Spacewatch	·	3.2 km	MPC · JPL
496266	2012 RU_{27}	—	April 4, 2011	Mount Lemmon	Mount Lemmon Survey	·	1.5 km	MPC · JPL
496267	2012 RU_{37}	—	August 26, 2012	Haleakala	Pan-STARRS 1	·	2.6 km	MPC · JPL
496268	2012 SR_{4}	—	April 22, 2004	Kitt Peak	Spacewatch	VER	3.7 km	MPC · JPL
496269	2012 SS_{20}	—	November 15, 2007	Catalina	CSS	·	1.8 km	MPC · JPL
496270	2012 ST_{32}	—	October 9, 2007	Mount Lemmon	Mount Lemmon Survey	·	1.6 km	MPC · JPL
496271	2012 TX_{3}	—	October 14, 2007	Mount Lemmon	Mount Lemmon Survey	·	2.6 km	MPC · JPL
496272	2012 TW_{27}	—	November 1, 2007	Kitt Peak	Spacewatch	THM	2.1 km	MPC · JPL
496273	2012 TF_{67}	—	September 16, 2012	Mount Lemmon	Mount Lemmon Survey	T_{j} (2.96)	3.3 km	MPC · JPL
496274	2012 TN_{121}	—	October 15, 2007	Kitt Peak	Spacewatch	·	2.1 km	MPC · JPL
496275	2012 TG_{123}	—	October 8, 2012	Catalina	CSS	H	620 m	MPC · JPL
496276	2012 TS_{141}	—	September 14, 2012	Mount Lemmon	Mount Lemmon Survey	H	430 m	MPC · JPL
496277	2012 TF_{175}	—	September 25, 2012	Mount Lemmon	Mount Lemmon Survey	VER	2.3 km	MPC · JPL
496278	2012 TV_{205}	—	October 11, 2012	Mount Lemmon	Mount Lemmon Survey	·	2.6 km	MPC · JPL
496279	2012 TC_{291}	—	September 28, 2006	Catalina	CSS	·	3.4 km	MPC · JPL
496280	2012 UF_{47}	—	December 5, 2007	Kitt Peak	Spacewatch	·	2.8 km	MPC · JPL
496281	2012 UO_{60}	—	September 15, 2006	Kitt Peak	Spacewatch	T_{j} (2.98)	3.0 km	MPC · JPL
496282	2012 UK_{65}	—	November 18, 2008	Kitt Peak	Spacewatch	·	840 m	MPC · JPL
496283	2012 UM_{106}	—	November 26, 2005	Mount Lemmon	Mount Lemmon Survey	·	780 m	MPC · JPL
496284	2012 VV_{45}	—	October 20, 2012	Haleakala	Pan-STARRS 1	H	470 m	MPC · JPL
496285	2012 VP_{93}	—	November 14, 2012	Kitt Peak	Spacewatch	CYB	3.3 km	MPC · JPL
496286	2012 VQ_{102}	—	July 27, 2011	Haleakala	Pan-STARRS 1	·	1.7 km	MPC · JPL
496287	2012 VD_{106}	—	November 18, 2007	Mount Lemmon	Mount Lemmon Survey	·	1.5 km	MPC · JPL
496288	2012 VZ_{107}	—	November 16, 2006	Mount Lemmon	Mount Lemmon Survey	·	3.4 km	MPC · JPL
496289	2012 VE_{111}	—	November 7, 2012	Haleakala	Pan-STARRS 1	3:2 · SHU	3.8 km	MPC · JPL
496290	2012 YA_{6}	—	June 2, 2011	Haleakala	Pan-STARRS 1	H	650 m	MPC · JPL
496291	2013 AD_{3}	—	October 14, 2007	Mount Lemmon	Mount Lemmon Survey	·	1.9 km	MPC · JPL
496292	2013 AF_{55}	—	September 24, 2011	Haleakala	Pan-STARRS 1	·	2.3 km	MPC · JPL
496293	2013 AL_{55}	—	December 8, 2012	Kitt Peak	Spacewatch	L4	10 km	MPC · JPL
496294	2013 AL_{94}	—	July 26, 2011	Haleakala	Pan-STARRS 1	·	1.8 km	MPC · JPL
496295	2013 AA_{131}	—	October 23, 2006	Catalina	CSS	(895)	5.3 km	MPC · JPL
496296	2013 BB_{71}	—	January 10, 2013	Haleakala	Pan-STARRS 1	·	680 m	MPC · JPL
496297	2013 BZ_{75}	—	September 25, 2011	Haleakala	Pan-STARRS 1	·	2.3 km	MPC · JPL
496298	2013 CC_{122}	—	January 14, 2002	Kitt Peak	Spacewatch	·	2.3 km	MPC · JPL
496299	2013 CB_{124}	—	January 19, 2013	Mount Lemmon	Mount Lemmon Survey	·	820 m	MPC · JPL
496300	2013 CV_{194}	—	September 6, 2008	Mount Lemmon	Mount Lemmon Survey	L4 · ERY	6.5 km	MPC · JPL

== 496301–496400 ==
back to top

Designation			Discovery			Properties		Ref
Permanent	Provisional	Named after	Date	Site	Discoverer(s)	Category	Diam.	Ref
496301	2013 CZ_{212}	—	February 7, 2013	Kitt Peak	Spacewatch	·	600 m	MPC · JPL
496302	2013 CA_{215}	—	September 13, 2007	Mount Lemmon	Mount Lemmon Survey	L4	7.7 km	MPC · JPL
496303	2013 ER_{48}	—	September 4, 2011	Haleakala	Pan-STARRS 1	·	620 m	MPC · JPL
496304	2013 EJ_{95}	—	July 4, 2010	Kitt Peak	Spacewatch	NYS	820 m	MPC · JPL
496305	2013 EG_{106}	—	March 23, 2006	Kitt Peak	Spacewatch	·	770 m	MPC · JPL
496306	2013 EW_{122}	—	October 20, 2011	Mount Lemmon	Mount Lemmon Survey	·	940 m	MPC · JPL
496307	2013 FJ_{4}	—	January 16, 2009	Mount Lemmon	Mount Lemmon Survey	·	1.0 km	MPC · JPL
496308	2013 FT_{11}	—	December 30, 2008	Kitt Peak	Spacewatch	·	610 m	MPC · JPL
496309	2013 GP_{31}	—	November 24, 2011	Haleakala	Pan-STARRS 1	·	750 m	MPC · JPL
496310	2013 GX_{43}	—	March 24, 2006	Kitt Peak	Spacewatch	·	860 m	MPC · JPL
496311	2013 GK_{101}	—	April 10, 2013	Haleakala	Pan-STARRS 1	·	710 m	MPC · JPL
496312	2013 GH_{102}	—	March 11, 2013	Mount Lemmon	Mount Lemmon Survey	·	640 m	MPC · JPL
496313	2013 GH_{112}	—	April 8, 2013	Mount Lemmon	Mount Lemmon Survey	·	780 m	MPC · JPL
496314	2013 GS_{120}	—	March 16, 2013	Mount Lemmon	Mount Lemmon Survey	V	540 m	MPC · JPL
496315	2013 GP_{136}	—	April 4, 2013	Mauna Kea	OSSOS	SDO	173 km	MPC · JPL
496316	2013 HQ_{11}	—	November 25, 2011	Haleakala	Pan-STARRS 1	·	1.5 km	MPC · JPL
496317	2013 HS_{40}	—	November 29, 2011	Kitt Peak	Spacewatch	V	530 m	MPC · JPL
496318	2013 HT_{43}	—	May 20, 2006	Kitt Peak	Spacewatch	·	800 m	MPC · JPL
496319	2013 HG_{50}	—	January 5, 2006	Kitt Peak	Spacewatch	·	470 m	MPC · JPL
496320	2013 HZ_{142}	—	September 22, 2003	Kitt Peak	Spacewatch	MAS	500 m	MPC · JPL
496321	2013 JJ_{23}	—	October 26, 2011	Haleakala	Pan-STARRS 1	·	1.0 km	MPC · JPL
496322	2013 JR_{29}	—	December 29, 2011	Mount Lemmon	Mount Lemmon Survey	·	1.8 km	MPC · JPL
496323	2013 JY_{60}	—	October 1, 2010	Mount Lemmon	Mount Lemmon Survey	·	930 m	MPC · JPL
496324	2013 KU_{1}	—	May 16, 2013	Haleakala	Pan-STARRS 1	·	2.0 km	MPC · JPL
496325	2013 KB_{13}	—	September 16, 2006	Catalina	CSS	·	980 m	MPC · JPL
496326	2013 LB_{1}	—	June 1, 2013	Mount Lemmon	Mount Lemmon Survey	AMO +1km	1.1 km	MPC · JPL
496327	2013 MY_{6}	—	June 22, 2013	Haleakala	Pan-STARRS 1	APO +1km	920 m	MPC · JPL
496328	2013 NB_{8}	—	July 1, 2013	Haleakala	Pan-STARRS 1	(2076)	960 m	MPC · JPL
496329	2013 NF_{13}	—	July 11, 2013	Haleakala	Pan-STARRS 1	·	1.6 km	MPC · JPL
496330	2013 NB_{21}	—	January 19, 2012	Haleakala	Pan-STARRS 1	·	2.0 km	MPC · JPL
496331	2013 OH_{8}	—	July 15, 2004	Siding Spring	SSS	EUN	1.5 km	MPC · JPL
496332	2013 OC_{9}	—	October 27, 2009	La Sagra	OAM	·	1.7 km	MPC · JPL
496333	2013 OK_{9}	—	October 16, 2009	Catalina	CSS	JUN	880 m	MPC · JPL
496334	2013 PL_{3}	—	December 8, 2004	Socorro	LINEAR	·	2.1 km	MPC · JPL
496335	2013 PD_{18}	—	February 8, 2011	Mount Lemmon	Mount Lemmon Survey	·	1.7 km	MPC · JPL
496336	2013 PO_{19}	—	March 14, 2007	Mount Lemmon	Mount Lemmon Survey	·	2.5 km	MPC · JPL
496337	2013 PR_{23}	—	November 25, 2005	Mount Lemmon	Mount Lemmon Survey	·	1.1 km	MPC · JPL
496338	2013 PS_{25}	—	February 5, 2011	Mount Lemmon	Mount Lemmon Survey	·	1.5 km	MPC · JPL
496339	2013 PR_{30}	—	April 12, 2010	WISE	WISE	·	3.8 km	MPC · JPL
496340	2013 PB_{43}	—	February 25, 2011	Mount Lemmon	Mount Lemmon Survey	·	1.7 km	MPC · JPL
496341	2013 PN_{62}	—	February 11, 2011	Mount Lemmon	Mount Lemmon Survey	·	1.5 km	MPC · JPL
496342	2013 PA_{70}	—	June 20, 2013	Haleakala	Pan-STARRS 1	·	1.4 km	MPC · JPL
496343	2013 QR_{2}	—	August 18, 2009	Kitt Peak	Spacewatch	·	1.0 km	MPC · JPL
496344	2013 QA_{3}	—	April 15, 2012	Haleakala	Pan-STARRS 1	·	1.3 km	MPC · JPL
496345	2013 QF_{8}	—	October 25, 2009	Kitt Peak	Spacewatch	·	1.6 km	MPC · JPL
496346	2013 QX_{14}	—	March 16, 2012	Haleakala	Pan-STARRS 1	·	1.2 km	MPC · JPL
496347	2013 QJ_{41}	—	February 23, 2003	Anderson Mesa	LONEOS	·	2.1 km	MPC · JPL
496348	2013 QU_{47}	—	March 24, 2012	Mount Lemmon	Mount Lemmon Survey	·	1.5 km	MPC · JPL
496349	2013 QZ_{53}	—	February 25, 2011	Mount Lemmon	Mount Lemmon Survey	·	2.1 km	MPC · JPL
496350	2013 QU_{57}	—	February 25, 2011	Mount Lemmon	Mount Lemmon Survey	·	1.8 km	MPC · JPL
496351	2013 QD_{62}	—	August 18, 2009	Kitt Peak	Spacewatch	·	1.1 km	MPC · JPL
496352	2013 QO_{65}	—	February 8, 2011	Mount Lemmon	Mount Lemmon Survey	·	2.1 km	MPC · JPL
496353	2013 QR_{65}	—	December 3, 2005	Kitt Peak	Spacewatch	EUN	1.1 km	MPC · JPL
496354	2013 QD_{68}	—	May 20, 2013	Haleakala	Pan-STARRS 1	EUN	1.2 km	MPC · JPL
496355	2013 QU_{68}	—	July 29, 2008	Kitt Peak	Spacewatch	·	1.4 km	MPC · JPL
496356	2013 QN_{69}	—	February 28, 2012	Haleakala	Pan-STARRS 1	MAS	810 m	MPC · JPL
496357	2013 QW_{70}	—	February 15, 2012	Haleakala	Pan-STARRS 1	·	1.0 km	MPC · JPL
496358	2013 QW_{71}	—	September 28, 2009	Mount Lemmon	Mount Lemmon Survey	·	1.2 km	MPC · JPL
496359	2013 QE_{77}	—	February 27, 2012	Haleakala	Pan-STARRS 1	·	940 m	MPC · JPL
496360	2013 QK_{84}	—	January 30, 2006	Kitt Peak	Spacewatch	·	2.3 km	MPC · JPL
496361	2013 RN_{17}	—	January 14, 2011	Mount Lemmon	Mount Lemmon Survey	·	1.2 km	MPC · JPL
496362	2013 RY_{18}	—	November 25, 2005	Mount Lemmon	Mount Lemmon Survey	(5)	1.2 km	MPC · JPL
496363	2013 RB_{22}	—	February 27, 2012	Haleakala	Pan-STARRS 1	·	980 m	MPC · JPL
496364	2013 RS_{24}	—	November 10, 2009	Kitt Peak	Spacewatch	MIS	2.1 km	MPC · JPL
496365	2013 RJ_{32}	—	September 2, 2013	Catalina	CSS	CYB	4.3 km	MPC · JPL
496366	2013 RQ_{40}	—	March 11, 2005	Kitt Peak	Spacewatch	·	2.7 km	MPC · JPL
496367	2013 RH_{42}	—	August 27, 2008	La Sagra	OAM	·	2.0 km	MPC · JPL
496368	2013 RF_{49}	—	September 10, 2013	Haleakala	Pan-STARRS 1	·	1.1 km	MPC · JPL
496369	2013 RZ_{71}	—	April 4, 2011	Mount Lemmon	Mount Lemmon Survey	·	1.7 km	MPC · JPL
496370	2013 RP_{76}	—	September 2, 2013	Mount Lemmon	Mount Lemmon Survey	·	1.7 km	MPC · JPL
496371	2013 RV_{83}	—	November 17, 2009	Kitt Peak	Spacewatch	·	1.7 km	MPC · JPL
496372	2013 RD_{91}	—	October 23, 2009	Mount Lemmon	Mount Lemmon Survey	·	1.1 km	MPC · JPL
496373	2013 SY_{16}	—	October 5, 2004	Kitt Peak	Spacewatch	·	1.4 km	MPC · JPL
496374	2013 SZ_{25}	—	September 11, 2007	Mount Lemmon	Mount Lemmon Survey	·	2.6 km	MPC · JPL
496375	2013 SC_{43}	—	September 27, 2013	Haleakala	Pan-STARRS 1	HOF	2.8 km	MPC · JPL
496376	2013 SY_{45}	—	October 23, 2009	Kitt Peak	Spacewatch	·	1.4 km	MPC · JPL
496377	2013 SQ_{59}	—	September 13, 2004	Kitt Peak	Spacewatch	·	1.4 km	MPC · JPL
496378	2013 SH_{71}	—	February 26, 2011	Mount Lemmon	Mount Lemmon Survey	·	1.7 km	MPC · JPL
496379	2013 SB_{82}	—	November 16, 2009	Kitt Peak	Spacewatch	·	1.5 km	MPC · JPL
496380	2013 TU_{7}	—	February 8, 2011	Mount Lemmon	Mount Lemmon Survey	(21344)	1.8 km	MPC · JPL
496381	2013 TT_{13}	—	May 15, 2012	Haleakala	Pan-STARRS 1	·	1.7 km	MPC · JPL
496382	2013 TK_{21}	—	July 19, 2009	La Sagra	OAM	·	1.3 km	MPC · JPL
496383	2013 TG_{24}	—	September 24, 2000	Socorro	LINEAR	·	1.6 km	MPC · JPL
496384	2013 TQ_{24}	—	May 1, 2012	Mount Lemmon	Mount Lemmon Survey	·	1.4 km	MPC · JPL
496385	2013 TD_{28}	—	February 25, 2011	Mount Lemmon	Mount Lemmon Survey	·	1.9 km	MPC · JPL
496386	2013 TF_{28}	—	September 6, 2013	Kitt Peak	Spacewatch	·	1.4 km	MPC · JPL
496387	2013 TQ_{29}	—	July 16, 2013	Haleakala	Pan-STARRS 1	·	3.5 km	MPC · JPL
496388	2013 TY_{35}	—	October 23, 2006	Mount Lemmon	Mount Lemmon Survey	·	930 m	MPC · JPL
496389	2013 TO_{37}	—	April 4, 2011	Mount Lemmon	Mount Lemmon Survey	·	3.0 km	MPC · JPL
496390	2013 TX_{37}	—	September 15, 2013	Haleakala	Pan-STARRS 1	·	2.4 km	MPC · JPL
496391	2013 TA_{50}	—	December 13, 2006	Kitt Peak	Spacewatch	NYS	1.0 km	MPC · JPL
496392	2013 TU_{51}	—	December 21, 2005	Kitt Peak	Spacewatch	·	860 m	MPC · JPL
496393	2013 TV_{52}	—	August 8, 2004	Campo Imperatore	CINEOS	·	1.4 km	MPC · JPL
496394	2013 TR_{73}	—	July 16, 2013	Haleakala	Pan-STARRS 1	·	3.5 km	MPC · JPL
496395	2013 TQ_{75}	—	May 5, 2008	Mount Lemmon	Mount Lemmon Survey	·	1.3 km	MPC · JPL
496396	2013 TM_{78}	—	October 9, 2004	Kitt Peak	Spacewatch	·	1.4 km	MPC · JPL
496397	2013 TD_{80}	—	March 24, 2003	Kitt Peak	Spacewatch	·	2.0 km	MPC · JPL
496398	2013 TS_{88}	—	October 1, 2013	Kitt Peak	Spacewatch	·	3.1 km	MPC · JPL
496399	2013 TT_{99}	—	October 29, 2008	Kitt Peak	Spacewatch	·	1.6 km	MPC · JPL
496400	2013 TR_{102}	—	August 16, 2009	La Sagra	OAM	·	1.2 km	MPC · JPL

== 496401–496500 ==
back to top

Designation			Discovery			Properties		Ref
Permanent	Provisional	Named after	Date	Site	Discoverer(s)	Category	Diam.	Ref
496401	2013 TR_{109}	—	April 13, 2011	Haleakala	Pan-STARRS 1	·	3.3 km	MPC · JPL
496402	2013 TZ_{110}	—	November 9, 1999	Kitt Peak	Spacewatch	·	1.8 km	MPC · JPL
496403	2013 TW_{125}	—	September 13, 2013	Kitt Peak	Spacewatch	EUN	1.0 km	MPC · JPL
496404	2013 TD_{145}	—	August 27, 2004	Anderson Mesa	LONEOS	·	1.7 km	MPC · JPL
496405	2013 UY_{5}	—	June 2, 2008	Mount Lemmon	Mount Lemmon Survey	·	1.8 km	MPC · JPL
496406	2013 WZ_{2}	—	September 13, 2007	Catalina	CSS	·	3.7 km	MPC · JPL
496407	2013 WB_{5}	—	October 13, 2007	Catalina	CSS	·	2.6 km	MPC · JPL
496408	2013 WQ_{9}	—	November 11, 2004	Kitt Peak	Spacewatch	·	1.6 km	MPC · JPL
496409	2013 WL_{27}	—	October 8, 2004	Socorro	LINEAR	·	1.8 km	MPC · JPL
496410	2013 WX_{37}	—	October 27, 2008	Mount Lemmon	Mount Lemmon Survey	·	2.1 km	MPC · JPL
496411	2013 WN_{104}	—	October 26, 2013	Mount Lemmon	Mount Lemmon Survey	·	3.2 km	MPC · JPL
496412	2013 WB_{106}	—	February 6, 2010	WISE	WISE	T_{j} (2.97)	4.2 km	MPC · JPL
496413	2013 WD_{106}	—	December 13, 2004	Kitt Peak	Spacewatch	DOR	3.9 km	MPC · JPL
496414	2013 XT_{19}	—	October 22, 2012	Haleakala	Pan-STARRS 1	·	2.8 km	MPC · JPL
496415	2013 YD_{36}	—	September 5, 2007	Catalina	CSS	·	3.3 km	MPC · JPL
496416	2013 YE_{88}	—	November 12, 2012	Haleakala	Pan-STARRS 1	·	3.5 km	MPC · JPL
496417	2014 BJ_{55}	—	December 25, 2013	Mount Lemmon	Mount Lemmon Survey	CYB	3.5 km	MPC · JPL
496418	2014 CY_{13}	—	February 9, 2014	Haleakala	Pan-STARRS 1	H	490 m	MPC · JPL
496419	2014 DL_{47}	—	September 25, 2008	Mount Lemmon	Mount Lemmon Survey	L4	7.2 km	MPC · JPL
496420	2014 DD_{49}	—	February 27, 2014	Kitt Peak	Spacewatch	EUN	1.1 km	MPC · JPL
496421	2014 DL_{54}	—	February 10, 2014	Haleakala	Pan-STARRS 1	·	1.6 km	MPC · JPL
496422	2014 DR_{110}	—	February 28, 2009	Kitt Peak	Spacewatch	H	460 m	MPC · JPL
496423	2014 DR_{141}	—	February 10, 2014	Haleakala	Pan-STARRS 1	H	470 m	MPC · JPL
496424	2014 EV_{4}	—	February 27, 2014	Kitt Peak	Spacewatch	·	2.2 km	MPC · JPL
496425	2014 FT_{64}	—	October 19, 2011	Mount Lemmon	Mount Lemmon Survey	·	2.6 km	MPC · JPL
496426	2014 GQ_{9}	—	October 29, 2011	Haleakala	Pan-STARRS 1	·	3.7 km	MPC · JPL
496427	2014 GG_{18}	—	March 23, 2014	Kitt Peak	Spacewatch	H	440 m	MPC · JPL
496428	2014 GC_{50}	—	January 12, 2011	Kitt Peak	Spacewatch	H	550 m	MPC · JPL
496429	2014 JH_{27}	—	February 28, 2014	Haleakala	Pan-STARRS 1	·	2.0 km	MPC · JPL
496430	2014 JB_{31}	—	May 6, 2014	Haleakala	Pan-STARRS 1	H	520 m	MPC · JPL
496431	2014 JM_{34}	—	October 26, 2011	Haleakala	Pan-STARRS 1	·	3.0 km	MPC · JPL
496432	2014 KX_{78}	—	May 6, 2014	Haleakala	Pan-STARRS 1	·	1.2 km	MPC · JPL
496433	2014 LB_{1}	—	October 2, 2003	Kitt Peak	Spacewatch	·	930 m	MPC · JPL
496434	2014 LV_{15}	—	April 26, 2003	Kitt Peak	Spacewatch	·	1.3 km	MPC · JPL
496435	2014 LJ_{17}	—	June 1, 2014	Haleakala	Pan-STARRS 1	H	450 m	MPC · JPL
496436	2014 LZ_{26}	—	October 25, 2011	Haleakala	Pan-STARRS 1	·	1 km	MPC · JPL
496437	2014 MJ_{9}	—	April 7, 2008	Kitt Peak	Spacewatch	·	2.3 km	MPC · JPL
496438	2014 NS_{2}	—	October 25, 2011	Haleakala	Pan-STARRS 1	·	880 m	MPC · JPL
496439	2014 OC_{36}	—	March 14, 2007	Mount Lemmon	Mount Lemmon Survey	·	570 m	MPC · JPL
496440	2014 OH_{99}	—	July 26, 2014	Haleakala	Pan-STARRS 1	·	840 m	MPC · JPL
496441	2014 OM_{112}	—	April 25, 2007	Kitt Peak	Spacewatch	·	520 m	MPC · JPL
496442	2014 OA_{137}	—	August 26, 1998	Kitt Peak	Spacewatch	THM	1.7 km	MPC · JPL
496443	2014 OF_{214}	—	April 17, 2013	Haleakala	Pan-STARRS 1	·	2.8 km	MPC · JPL
496444	2014 OM_{230}	—	October 25, 2011	Haleakala	Pan-STARRS 1	·	620 m	MPC · JPL
496445	2014 OJ_{232}	—	January 30, 2008	Kitt Peak	Spacewatch	·	990 m	MPC · JPL
496446	2014 OW_{346}	—	February 3, 2012	Haleakala	Pan-STARRS 1	·	2.5 km	MPC · JPL
496447	2014 PC	—	November 26, 2011	Haleakala	Pan-STARRS 1	·	650 m	MPC · JPL
496448	2014 PW_{22}	—	January 3, 2013	Haleakala	Pan-STARRS 1	H	520 m	MPC · JPL
496449	2014 PJ_{29}	—	June 24, 2014	Haleakala	Pan-STARRS 1	·	550 m	MPC · JPL
496450	2014 QB_{1}	—	April 20, 2007	Kitt Peak	Spacewatch	·	620 m	MPC · JPL
496451	2014 QD_{32}	—	September 17, 2006	Catalina	CSS	H	540 m	MPC · JPL
496452	2014 QV_{42}	—	August 19, 2014	Haleakala	Pan-STARRS 1	·	2.8 km	MPC · JPL
496453	2014 QR_{130}	—	August 5, 2014	Haleakala	Pan-STARRS 1	·	1.2 km	MPC · JPL
496454	2014 QM_{263}	—	October 23, 2011	Haleakala	Pan-STARRS 1	·	990 m	MPC · JPL
496455	2014 QJ_{279}	—	July 6, 2014	Haleakala	Pan-STARRS 1	·	760 m	MPC · JPL
496456	2014 QF_{284}	—	October 17, 2010	Mount Lemmon	Mount Lemmon Survey	·	1.6 km	MPC · JPL
496457	2014 QN_{297}	—	October 29, 2005	Catalina	CSS	·	910 m	MPC · JPL
496458	2014 QJ_{356}	—	March 8, 2013	Haleakala	Pan-STARRS 1	·	980 m	MPC · JPL
496459	2014 QV_{372}	—	February 26, 2012	Kitt Peak	Spacewatch	·	2.9 km	MPC · JPL
496460	2014 QS_{414}	—	April 11, 2010	Mount Lemmon	Mount Lemmon Survey	·	550 m	MPC · JPL
496461	2014 QG_{415}	—	September 24, 2011	Haleakala	Pan-STARRS 1	·	750 m	MPC · JPL
496462	2014 QQ_{427}	—	December 3, 2005	Mauna Kea	A. Boattini	·	2.8 km	MPC · JPL
496463	2014 QB_{439}	—	May 2, 2003	Kitt Peak	Spacewatch	·	2.1 km	MPC · JPL
496464	2014 SW_{102}	—	February 1, 2006	Kitt Peak	Spacewatch	THM	2.0 km	MPC · JPL
496465	2014 SQ_{103}	—	October 23, 2009	Mount Lemmon	Mount Lemmon Survey	·	1.6 km	MPC · JPL
496466	2014 SJ_{112}	—	September 17, 2003	Kitt Peak	Spacewatch	·	770 m	MPC · JPL
496467	2014 SO_{112}	—	September 5, 2007	Mount Lemmon	Mount Lemmon Survey	·	520 m	MPC · JPL
496468	2014 SA_{113}	—	October 9, 2007	Kitt Peak	Spacewatch	·	640 m	MPC · JPL
496469	2014 SB_{126}	—	August 24, 2007	Kitt Peak	Spacewatch	·	510 m	MPC · JPL
496470	2014 SV_{153}	—	November 12, 2010	Mount Lemmon	Mount Lemmon Survey	·	1.3 km	MPC · JPL
496471	2014 SL_{157}	—	February 28, 2012	Haleakala	Pan-STARRS 1	·	3.0 km	MPC · JPL
496472	2014 SS_{204}	—	January 23, 2006	Kitt Peak	Spacewatch	·	710 m	MPC · JPL
496473	2014 SE_{207}	—	September 18, 2001	Kitt Peak	Spacewatch	·	1.5 km	MPC · JPL
496474	2014 SR_{207}	—	March 30, 2011	Haleakala	Pan-STARRS 1	·	2.1 km	MPC · JPL
496475	2014 SO_{211}	—	March 2, 2009	Mount Lemmon	Mount Lemmon Survey	V	800 m	MPC · JPL
496476	2014 ST_{214}	—	May 2, 2009	Kitt Peak	Spacewatch	·	1.9 km	MPC · JPL
496477	2014 SN_{215}	—	March 4, 2011	Mount Lemmon	Mount Lemmon Survey	·	2.4 km	MPC · JPL
496478	2014 SP_{217}	—	January 28, 2007	Kitt Peak	Spacewatch	·	1.6 km	MPC · JPL
496479	2014 SC_{219}	—	November 19, 2007	Mount Lemmon	Mount Lemmon Survey	·	1.5 km	MPC · JPL
496480	2014 SP_{278}	—	November 6, 2007	Kitt Peak	Spacewatch	V	700 m	MPC · JPL
496481	2014 SY_{287}	—	November 29, 2003	Kitt Peak	Spacewatch	·	1.2 km	MPC · JPL
496482	2014 SG_{303}	—	October 16, 2003	Socorro	LINEAR	PHO	2.5 km	MPC · JPL
496483	2014 SC_{310}	—	December 1, 2010	Mount Lemmon	Mount Lemmon Survey	·	1.5 km	MPC · JPL
496484	2014 SD_{314}	—	October 10, 2007	Mount Lemmon	Mount Lemmon Survey	·	750 m	MPC · JPL
496485	2014 SM_{315}	—	September 2, 2014	Haleakala	Pan-STARRS 1	·	1.4 km	MPC · JPL
496486	2014 SF_{316}	—	May 10, 2010	WISE	WISE	·	1.1 km	MPC · JPL
496487	2014 TE_{9}	—	October 30, 2007	Mount Lemmon	Mount Lemmon Survey	·	830 m	MPC · JPL
496488	2014 TK_{9}	—	December 5, 2007	Kitt Peak	Spacewatch	·	870 m	MPC · JPL
496489	2014 TN_{22}	—	October 1, 2014	Kitt Peak	Spacewatch	·	1.2 km	MPC · JPL
496490	2014 TQ_{22}	—	April 13, 2002	Palomar	NEAT	MAS	800 m	MPC · JPL
496491	2014 TJ_{58}	—	June 7, 2013	Haleakala	Pan-STARRS 1	PHO	990 m	MPC · JPL
496492	2014 TP_{58}	—	March 14, 2012	Kitt Peak	Spacewatch	EUN	1.4 km	MPC · JPL
496493	2014 TB_{63}	—	September 11, 2007	Catalina	CSS	·	910 m	MPC · JPL
496494	2014 TD_{66}	—	August 24, 2007	Kitt Peak	Spacewatch	NYS	1.1 km	MPC · JPL
496495	2014 TK_{72}	—	November 17, 2006	Mount Lemmon	Mount Lemmon Survey	·	1.1 km	MPC · JPL
496496	2014 TU_{74}	—	November 13, 2006	Catalina	CSS	·	830 m	MPC · JPL
496497	2014 UE_{15}	—	November 18, 2006	Mount Lemmon	Mount Lemmon Survey	·	1.3 km	MPC · JPL
496498	2014 UJ_{49}	—	November 11, 2004	Kitt Peak	Spacewatch	·	740 m	MPC · JPL
496499	2014 UW_{49}	—	October 14, 2007	Mount Lemmon	Mount Lemmon Survey	·	830 m	MPC · JPL
496500	2014 UP_{53}	—	August 16, 2009	Kitt Peak	Spacewatch	·	1.8 km	MPC · JPL

== 496501–496600 ==
back to top

Designation			Discovery			Properties		Ref
Permanent	Provisional	Named after	Date	Site	Discoverer(s)	Category	Diam.	Ref
496501	2014 UY_{66}	—	February 12, 2008	Mount Lemmon	Mount Lemmon Survey	·	1.8 km	MPC · JPL
496502	2014 US_{67}	—	May 13, 2004	Kitt Peak	Spacewatch	·	2.1 km	MPC · JPL
496503	2014 UA_{72}	—	September 24, 2014	Kitt Peak	Spacewatch	MAR	920 m	MPC · JPL
496504	2014 UR_{85}	—	October 21, 2014	Mount Lemmon	Mount Lemmon Survey	·	970 m	MPC · JPL
496505	2014 UF_{87}	—	November 1, 2010	Mount Lemmon	Mount Lemmon Survey	MAR	920 m	MPC · JPL
496506	2014 UA_{103}	—	December 3, 2000	Kitt Peak	Spacewatch	AGN	1.2 km	MPC · JPL
496507	2014 UA_{118}	—	February 1, 2012	Kitt Peak	Spacewatch	·	1.1 km	MPC · JPL
496508	2014 UH_{121}	—	September 13, 2005	Kitt Peak	Spacewatch	·	1.3 km	MPC · JPL
496509	2014 UV_{132}	—	October 19, 1995	Kitt Peak	Spacewatch	·	2.1 km	MPC · JPL
496510	2014 UB_{133}	—	October 15, 2007	Mount Lemmon	Mount Lemmon Survey	·	810 m	MPC · JPL
496511	2014 UE_{161}	—	November 20, 2001	Socorro	LINEAR	·	1.8 km	MPC · JPL
496512	2014 UX_{167}	—	March 27, 2012	Haleakala	Pan-STARRS 1	·	1.8 km	MPC · JPL
496513	2014 UJ_{173}	—	October 28, 2014	Mount Lemmon	Mount Lemmon Survey	·	1.2 km	MPC · JPL
496514	2014 UP_{176}	—	October 20, 2003	Kitt Peak	Spacewatch	·	1.3 km	MPC · JPL
496515	2014 UH_{189}	—	September 13, 2007	Catalina	CSS	V	630 m	MPC · JPL
496516	2014 UG_{198}	—	June 15, 2013	Haleakala	Pan-STARRS 1	·	1.6 km	MPC · JPL
496517	2014 UQ_{198}	—	January 17, 2007	Mount Lemmon	Mount Lemmon Survey	·	1.4 km	MPC · JPL
496518	2014 UX_{205}	—	December 2, 2010	Mount Lemmon	Mount Lemmon Survey	·	1.4 km	MPC · JPL
496519	2014 US_{218}	—	May 4, 2006	Siding Spring	SSS	PHO	1.1 km	MPC · JPL
496520	2014 VQ_{2}	—	January 9, 2002	Socorro	LINEAR	·	2.5 km	MPC · JPL
496521	2014 VG_{9}	—	October 5, 2010	La Sagra	OAM	V	730 m	MPC · JPL
496522	2014 VF_{14}	—	January 26, 2012	Mount Lemmon	Mount Lemmon Survey	·	1.3 km	MPC · JPL
496523	2014 VX_{21}	—	September 23, 2008	Kitt Peak	Spacewatch	·	2.7 km	MPC · JPL
496524	2014 WY_{10}	—	October 14, 2014	Kitt Peak	Spacewatch	·	1.5 km	MPC · JPL
496525	2014 WD_{51}	—	September 18, 2009	Kitt Peak	Spacewatch	·	1.8 km	MPC · JPL
496526	2014 WK_{68}	—	September 25, 2014	Mount Lemmon	Mount Lemmon Survey	·	680 m	MPC · JPL
496527	2014 WN_{72}	—	October 13, 2001	Anderson Mesa	LONEOS	·	1.1 km	MPC · JPL
496528	2014 WX_{73}	—	April 19, 2012	Mount Lemmon	Mount Lemmon Survey	·	2.2 km	MPC · JPL
496529	2014 WD_{123}	—	March 11, 2008	Kitt Peak	Spacewatch	(5)	1.7 km	MPC · JPL
496530	2014 WB_{136}	—	September 7, 2010	La Sagra	OAM	·	1.1 km	MPC · JPL
496531	2014 WA_{144}	—	February 8, 2008	Mount Lemmon	Mount Lemmon Survey	·	1.0 km	MPC · JPL
496532	2014 WF_{144}	—	October 31, 2008	Mount Lemmon	Mount Lemmon Survey	·	2.6 km	MPC · JPL
496533	2014 WK_{145}	—	January 22, 2012	Haleakala	Pan-STARRS 1	·	1.9 km	MPC · JPL
496534	2014 WL_{158}	—	March 7, 2008	Kitt Peak	Spacewatch	·	1.4 km	MPC · JPL
496535	2014 WU_{180}	—	July 6, 2013	Haleakala	Pan-STARRS 1	·	1.2 km	MPC · JPL
496536	2014 WW_{184}	—	April 2, 2011	Haleakala	Pan-STARRS 1	·	2.4 km	MPC · JPL
496537	2014 WE_{193}	—	April 23, 2010	WISE	WISE	·	3.1 km	MPC · JPL
496538	2014 WR_{196}	—	July 16, 2013	Haleakala	Pan-STARRS 1	·	1.9 km	MPC · JPL
496539	2014 WT_{199}	—	September 18, 2014	Haleakala	Pan-STARRS 1	·	2.2 km	MPC · JPL
496540	2014 WU_{201}	—	January 2, 2012	Mount Lemmon	Mount Lemmon Survey	·	840 m	MPC · JPL
496541	2014 WF_{224}	—	September 16, 2009	Kitt Peak	Spacewatch	·	2.2 km	MPC · JPL
496542	2014 WM_{254}	—	March 28, 2011	Kitt Peak	Spacewatch	EOS	1.7 km	MPC · JPL
496543	2014 WM_{261}	—	October 22, 2014	Kitt Peak	Spacewatch	·	1.4 km	MPC · JPL
496544	2014 WT_{261}	—	October 1, 2003	Kitt Peak	Spacewatch	·	1.9 km	MPC · JPL
496545	2014 WD_{262}	—	March 10, 2011	Mount Lemmon	Mount Lemmon Survey	·	2.1 km	MPC · JPL
496546	2014 WY_{282}	—	August 8, 2013	Haleakala	Pan-STARRS 1	·	2.0 km	MPC · JPL
496547	2014 WR_{310}	—	September 16, 2009	Mount Lemmon	Mount Lemmon Survey	·	1.3 km	MPC · JPL
496548	2014 WW_{320}	—	April 6, 2008	Kitt Peak	Spacewatch	HNS	960 m	MPC · JPL
496549	2014 WT_{341}	—	April 17, 2013	Haleakala	Pan-STARRS 1	·	1.0 km	MPC · JPL
496550	2014 WA_{353}	—	December 15, 2010	Mount Lemmon	Mount Lemmon Survey	·	1.3 km	MPC · JPL
496551	2014 WD_{353}	—	September 19, 2010	Kitt Peak	Spacewatch	EUN	1.4 km	MPC · JPL
496552	2014 WM_{385}	—	October 5, 2014	Mount Lemmon	Mount Lemmon Survey	·	1.3 km	MPC · JPL
496553	2014 WV_{406}	—	November 16, 2006	Lulin	LUSS	·	890 m	MPC · JPL
496554	2014 WT_{414}	—	December 15, 2009	Mount Lemmon	Mount Lemmon Survey	·	2.8 km	MPC · JPL
496555	2014 WW_{448}	—	March 13, 2005	Kitt Peak	Spacewatch	·	710 m	MPC · JPL
496556	2014 WR_{468}	—	December 1, 2008	Catalina	CSS	EOS	2.1 km	MPC · JPL
496557	2014 WK_{479}	—	May 13, 2010	WISE	WISE	·	4.4 km	MPC · JPL
496558	2014 WO_{479}	—	August 9, 2013	Kitt Peak	Spacewatch	JUN	1.2 km	MPC · JPL
496559	2014 WA_{489}	—	October 16, 2009	Catalina	CSS	·	2.0 km	MPC · JPL
496560	2014 XB_{2}	—	September 17, 2009	Kitt Peak	Spacewatch	·	1.7 km	MPC · JPL
496561	2014 XL_{4}	—	March 15, 2012	Haleakala	Pan-STARRS 1	·	2.2 km	MPC · JPL
496562	2014 XT_{26}	—	January 30, 2006	Kitt Peak	Spacewatch	·	2.8 km	MPC · JPL
496563	2014 XC_{27}	—	November 11, 2009	Catalina	CSS	·	2.5 km	MPC · JPL
496564	2014 XP_{37}	—	May 2, 2010	WISE	WISE	·	2.4 km	MPC · JPL
496565	2014 XL_{39}	—	July 8, 2003	Palomar	NEAT	·	1.2 km	MPC · JPL
496566	2014 YF_{10}	—	May 11, 2006	Mount Lemmon	Mount Lemmon Survey	·	4.9 km	MPC · JPL
496567	2014 YF_{12}	—	February 12, 2004	Kitt Peak	Spacewatch	·	3.7 km	MPC · JPL
496568	2014 YZ_{12}	—	December 16, 2009	Mount Lemmon	Mount Lemmon Survey	·	2.4 km	MPC · JPL
496569	2014 YR_{20}	—	January 14, 2011	Kitt Peak	Spacewatch	·	1.4 km	MPC · JPL
496570	2014 YF_{28}	—	December 21, 2003	Kitt Peak	Spacewatch	·	3.9 km	MPC · JPL
496571	2015 AX_{39}	—	February 17, 2010	Mount Lemmon	Mount Lemmon Survey	·	2.3 km	MPC · JPL
496572	2015 AG_{101}	—	September 1, 2013	Mount Lemmon	Mount Lemmon Survey	·	2.3 km	MPC · JPL
496573	2015 AO_{139}	—	January 7, 2010	WISE	WISE	·	3.3 km	MPC · JPL
496574	2015 AZ_{161}	—	October 25, 2005	Kitt Peak	Spacewatch	·	1.0 km	MPC · JPL
496575	2015 AH_{198}	—	October 13, 2006	Kitt Peak	Spacewatch	·	1 km	MPC · JPL
496576	2015 AB_{224}	—	September 13, 2005	Kitt Peak	Spacewatch	·	1.0 km	MPC · JPL
496577	2015 AH_{260}	—	October 5, 2012	Haleakala	Pan-STARRS 1	EOS	1.7 km	MPC · JPL
496578	2015 AB_{264}	—	October 12, 1998	Kitt Peak	Spacewatch	BRA	1.8 km	MPC · JPL
496579	2015 AL_{264}	—	May 8, 2010	Mount Lemmon	Mount Lemmon Survey	·	3.0 km	MPC · JPL
496580	2015 BE_{8}	—	May 5, 2010	WISE	WISE	T_{j} (2.97) · EUP	4.7 km	MPC · JPL
496581	2015 BS_{26}	—	April 22, 2011	Kitt Peak	Spacewatch	·	2.3 km	MPC · JPL
496582	2015 BZ_{35}	—	November 3, 2007	Kitt Peak	Spacewatch	·	3.5 km	MPC · JPL
496583	2015 BO_{75}	—	September 1, 2013	Haleakala	Pan-STARRS 1	·	1.4 km	MPC · JPL
496584	2015 BH_{76}	—	October 26, 2008	Mount Lemmon	Mount Lemmon Survey	·	2.0 km	MPC · JPL
496585	2015 BE_{84}	—	October 4, 2004	Kitt Peak	Spacewatch	AGN	1 km	MPC · JPL
496586	2015 BB_{101}	—	April 30, 2011	Kitt Peak	Spacewatch	EOS	1.8 km	MPC · JPL
496587	2015 BH_{156}	—	January 30, 2009	Kitt Peak	Spacewatch	T_{j} (2.96)	3.7 km	MPC · JPL
496588	2015 BU_{167}	—	October 24, 2008	Kitt Peak	Spacewatch	·	2.2 km	MPC · JPL
496589	2015 BU_{171}	—	May 21, 2006	Kitt Peak	Spacewatch	·	2.7 km	MPC · JPL
496590	2015 BF_{301}	—	December 18, 2007	Mount Lemmon	Mount Lemmon Survey	·	520 m	MPC · JPL
496591	2015 BG_{336}	—	October 3, 2013	Haleakala	Pan-STARRS 1	AGN	1.3 km	MPC · JPL
496592	2015 BT_{365}	—	April 25, 2007	Mount Lemmon	Mount Lemmon Survey	·	2.3 km	MPC · JPL
496593	2015 BC_{436}	—	February 27, 2012	Haleakala	Pan-STARRS 1	·	630 m	MPC · JPL
496594	2015 BD_{462}	—	December 31, 2008	Mount Lemmon	Mount Lemmon Survey	·	3.6 km	MPC · JPL
496595	2015 BX_{489}	—	November 19, 2009	Mount Lemmon	Mount Lemmon Survey	·	1.5 km	MPC · JPL
496596	2015 BP_{497}	—	May 22, 2011	Mount Lemmon	Mount Lemmon Survey	EMA	2.9 km	MPC · JPL
496597	2015 CV_{35}	—	May 26, 2011	Mount Lemmon	Mount Lemmon Survey	·	1.9 km	MPC · JPL
496598	2015 CH_{40}	—	November 6, 2013	Haleakala	Pan-STARRS 1	VER	2.3 km	MPC · JPL
496599	2015 CG_{47}	—	February 24, 2006	Kitt Peak	Spacewatch	·	2.0 km	MPC · JPL
496600	2015 CK_{56}	—	March 15, 2004	Kitt Peak	Spacewatch	·	2.7 km	MPC · JPL

== 496601–496700 ==
back to top

Designation			Discovery			Properties		Ref
Permanent	Provisional	Named after	Date	Site	Discoverer(s)	Category	Diam.	Ref
496601	2015 DA_{64}	—	August 17, 2012	Haleakala	Pan-STARRS 1	·	2.7 km	MPC · JPL
496602	2015 DY_{112}	—	September 14, 2006	Catalina	CSS	·	760 m	MPC · JPL
496603	2015 DP_{135}	—	December 5, 2002	Socorro	LINEAR	TIR	2.5 km	MPC · JPL
496604	2015 DC_{136}	—	November 8, 2010	Mount Lemmon	Mount Lemmon Survey	L4	8.3 km	MPC · JPL
496605	2015 DC_{145}	—	May 8, 2011	Kitt Peak	Spacewatch	ELF	3.5 km	MPC · JPL
496606	2015 DK_{156}	—	November 1, 2013	Mount Lemmon	Mount Lemmon Survey	·	2.9 km	MPC · JPL
496607	2015 DL_{213}	—	January 11, 2008	Mount Lemmon	Mount Lemmon Survey	·	600 m	MPC · JPL
496608	2015 ES_{9}	—	October 13, 2007	Mount Lemmon	Mount Lemmon Survey	·	3.5 km	MPC · JPL
496609	2015 EU_{53}	—	December 30, 2008	Mount Lemmon	Mount Lemmon Survey	·	3.0 km	MPC · JPL
496610	2015 FO_{133}	—	November 27, 2013	Haleakala	Pan-STARRS 1	·	2.1 km	MPC · JPL
496611	2015 FS_{169}	—	February 16, 2004	Kitt Peak	Spacewatch	·	710 m	MPC · JPL
496612	2015 FS_{338}	—	October 5, 2012	Haleakala	Pan-STARRS 1	·	1.5 km	MPC · JPL
496613	2015 FE_{382}	—	December 4, 2008	Mount Lemmon	Mount Lemmon Survey	EOS	2.0 km	MPC · JPL
496614	2015 GX_{2}	—	September 29, 1995	Kitt Peak	Spacewatch	VER	2.5 km	MPC · JPL
496615	2015 HA_{3}	—	August 2, 2011	Haleakala	Pan-STARRS 1	·	4.0 km	MPC · JPL
496616	2015 HH_{3}	—	August 26, 2012	Kitt Peak	Spacewatch	·	3.0 km	MPC · JPL
496617	2015 HD_{105}	—	April 28, 2011	Haleakala	Pan-STARRS 1	·	970 m	MPC · JPL
496618	2015 HE_{133}	—	October 8, 2008	Kitt Peak	Spacewatch	L4	6.8 km	MPC · JPL
496619	2015 KX_{42}	—	November 8, 2007	Kitt Peak	Spacewatch	·	2.1 km	MPC · JPL
496620	2015 PN_{3}	—	August 7, 2010	WISE	WISE	EUP	4.5 km	MPC · JPL
496621	2015 PV_{229}	—	September 16, 2006	Catalina	CSS	EUN	1.2 km	MPC · JPL
496622	2015 RZ_{23}	—	October 23, 2011	Haleakala	Pan-STARRS 1	·	1.2 km	MPC · JPL
496623	2015 RM_{24}	—	September 2, 2008	Kitt Peak	Spacewatch	·	880 m	MPC · JPL
496624	2015 RT_{63}	—	October 25, 2011	Haleakala	Pan-STARRS 1	·	1.3 km	MPC · JPL
496625	2015 RM_{76}	—	March 6, 2013	Haleakala	Pan-STARRS 1	·	1.3 km	MPC · JPL
496626	2015 RD_{98}	—	October 29, 2010	Catalina	CSS	·	2.1 km	MPC · JPL
496627	2015 TA_{24}	—	September 10, 2007	Catalina	CSS	H	500 m	MPC · JPL
496628	2015 TO_{209}	—	May 6, 2006	Mount Lemmon	Mount Lemmon Survey	H	480 m	MPC · JPL
496629	2015 TT_{212}	—	October 24, 2011	Kitt Peak	Spacewatch	(5)	1.2 km	MPC · JPL
496630	2015 TV_{219}	—	October 1, 2005	Kitt Peak	Spacewatch	KOR	990 m	MPC · JPL
496631	2015 TN_{294}	—	April 7, 2005	Mount Lemmon	Mount Lemmon Survey	KON	2.0 km	MPC · JPL
496632	2015 UE_{51}	—	March 22, 2009	Catalina	CSS	H	520 m	MPC · JPL
496633	2015 UF_{55}	—	September 13, 1998	Kitt Peak	Spacewatch	·	2.2 km	MPC · JPL
496634	2015 UX_{65}	—	February 12, 2011	Mount Lemmon	Mount Lemmon Survey	·	2.4 km	MPC · JPL
496635	2015 VP_{6}	—	October 13, 2015	Haleakala	Pan-STARRS 1	·	4.2 km	MPC · JPL
496636	2015 VZ_{33}	—	October 12, 2010	Mount Lemmon	Mount Lemmon Survey	·	2.0 km	MPC · JPL
496637	2015 VW_{66}	—	November 23, 2006	Kitt Peak	Spacewatch	·	1.7 km	MPC · JPL
496638	2015 VM_{74}	—	October 21, 2006	Mount Lemmon	Mount Lemmon Survey	·	1.5 km	MPC · JPL
496639	2015 VL_{118}	—	October 11, 2007	Catalina	CSS	H	440 m	MPC · JPL
496640	2015 XJ_{128}	—	June 12, 2010	WISE	WISE	H	410 m	MPC · JPL
496641	2015 XU_{179}	—	March 26, 2003	Kitt Peak	Spacewatch	·	530 m	MPC · JPL
496642	2016 AE_{3}	—	December 4, 2007	Kitt Peak	Spacewatch	·	1.2 km	MPC · JPL
496643	2016 AW_{77}	—	December 21, 2006	Mount Lemmon	Mount Lemmon Survey	MRX	1.3 km	MPC · JPL
496644	2016 AW_{95}	—	May 25, 2003	Nogales	P. R. Holvorcem, M. Schwartz	·	1.1 km	MPC · JPL
496645	2016 AG_{97}	—	March 3, 2005	Kitt Peak	Spacewatch	NYS	1.1 km	MPC · JPL
496646	2016 AR_{98}	—	January 15, 2009	Kitt Peak	Spacewatch	·	1.1 km	MPC · JPL
496647	2016 AC_{105}	—	November 22, 2014	Haleakala	Pan-STARRS 1	·	1.7 km	MPC · JPL
496648	2016 AZ_{110}	—	September 25, 2006	Mount Lemmon	Mount Lemmon Survey	V	760 m	MPC · JPL
496649	2016 AE_{111}	—	October 17, 2010	Mount Lemmon	Mount Lemmon Survey	·	1.2 km	MPC · JPL
496650	2016 AL_{122}	—	January 25, 2009	Kitt Peak	Spacewatch	V	460 m	MPC · JPL
496651	2016 AE_{129}	—	February 15, 2010	Catalina	CSS	(21885)	2.9 km	MPC · JPL
496652	2016 AV_{129}	—	April 6, 2011	Mount Lemmon	Mount Lemmon Survey	·	3.4 km	MPC · JPL
496653	2016 AZ_{130}	—	September 22, 2006	Anderson Mesa	LONEOS	H	780 m	MPC · JPL
496654	2016 AY_{142}	—	May 29, 2012	Mount Lemmon	Mount Lemmon Survey	·	2.3 km	MPC · JPL
496655	2016 AH_{177}	—	May 5, 2008	Mount Lemmon	Mount Lemmon Survey	·	2.5 km	MPC · JPL
496656	2016 AG_{178}	—	September 14, 1999	Kitt Peak	Spacewatch	·	2.3 km	MPC · JPL
496657	2016 AY_{183}	—	July 15, 2004	Siding Spring	SSS	·	2.3 km	MPC · JPL
496658	2016 BF_{4}	—	August 30, 2011	Haleakala	Pan-STARRS 1	·	830 m	MPC · JPL
496659	2016 BV_{19}	—	March 20, 1993	Kitt Peak	Spacewatch	·	1.3 km	MPC · JPL
496660	2016 BP_{26}	—	January 15, 2005	Kitt Peak	Spacewatch	MAS	640 m	MPC · JPL
496661	2016 BZ_{36}	—	April 7, 2008	Catalina	CSS	·	1.6 km	MPC · JPL
496662	2016 BK_{40}	—	October 28, 2011	Mount Lemmon	Mount Lemmon Survey	·	600 m	MPC · JPL
496663	2016 BX_{51}	—	September 4, 2000	Kitt Peak	Spacewatch	MRX	970 m	MPC · JPL
496664	2016 BK_{55}	—	February 10, 1996	Kitt Peak	Spacewatch	·	950 m	MPC · JPL
496665	2016 BP_{58}	—	May 11, 2004	Catalina	CSS	EUN	1.6 km	MPC · JPL
496666	2016 BD_{70}	—	June 7, 2013	Haleakala	Pan-STARRS 1	·	830 m	MPC · JPL
496667	2016 BF_{73}	—	October 9, 2005	Kitt Peak	Spacewatch	·	1.8 km	MPC · JPL
496668	2016 CH_{4}	—	September 11, 2010	Mount Lemmon	Mount Lemmon Survey	·	1.2 km	MPC · JPL
496669	2016 CT_{28}	—	November 1, 2007	Kitt Peak	Spacewatch	CYB	4.4 km	MPC · JPL
496670	2016 CY_{28}	—	January 2, 2011	Mount Lemmon	Mount Lemmon Survey	·	1.6 km	MPC · JPL
496671	2016 CY_{34}	—	October 14, 2014	Kitt Peak	Spacewatch	·	1.3 km	MPC · JPL
496672	2016 CF_{54}	—	April 2, 2009	Kitt Peak	Spacewatch	·	1.2 km	MPC · JPL
496673	2016 CU_{71}	—	April 22, 2012	Kitt Peak	Spacewatch	·	1.8 km	MPC · JPL
496674	2016 CE_{94}	—	February 28, 2010	WISE	WISE	·	2.5 km	MPC · JPL
496675	2016 CJ_{99}	—	November 5, 2010	Kitt Peak	Spacewatch	·	1.9 km	MPC · JPL
496676	2016 CY_{106}	—	February 13, 2008	Mount Lemmon	Mount Lemmon Survey	·	1.4 km	MPC · JPL
496677	2016 CV_{114}	—	September 18, 1995	Kitt Peak	Spacewatch	·	1.8 km	MPC · JPL
496678	2016 CJ_{120}	—	December 10, 2014	Mount Lemmon	Mount Lemmon Survey	·	2.9 km	MPC · JPL
496679	2016 CC_{123}	—	March 13, 2007	Kitt Peak	Spacewatch	·	1.6 km	MPC · JPL
496680	2016 CK_{133}	—	October 2, 2014	Haleakala	Pan-STARRS 1	·	910 m	MPC · JPL
496681	2016 CV_{207}	—	May 26, 2006	Mount Lemmon	Mount Lemmon Survey	V	800 m	MPC · JPL
496682	2016 CH_{219}	—	November 21, 2008	Mount Lemmon	Mount Lemmon Survey	·	510 m	MPC · JPL
496683	2016 CB_{246}	—	April 19, 2007	Mount Lemmon	Mount Lemmon Survey	·	2.8 km	MPC · JPL
496684	2016 CY_{248}	—	September 3, 2010	Mount Lemmon	Mount Lemmon Survey	·	1.0 km	MPC · JPL
496685	2016 CF_{257}	—	November 16, 2010	Catalina	CSS	HNS	1.3 km	MPC · JPL
496686	2016 CA_{264}	—	November 5, 2007	Kitt Peak	Spacewatch	V	700 m	MPC · JPL
496687	2016 DP_{9}	—	April 2, 2011	Haleakala	Pan-STARRS 1	EMA	2.6 km	MPC · JPL
496688	2016 EL_{23}	—	May 12, 2012	Haleakala	Pan-STARRS 1	·	2.1 km	MPC · JPL
496689	2016 EO_{29}	—	May 21, 2012	Haleakala	Pan-STARRS 1	·	2.2 km	MPC · JPL
496690	2016 EU_{56}	—	April 2, 2011	Haleakala	Pan-STARRS 1	·	2.1 km	MPC · JPL
496691	2016 ER_{81}	—	April 19, 2006	Kitt Peak	Spacewatch	·	3.9 km	MPC · JPL
496692	2016 EU_{87}	—	January 17, 2015	Mount Lemmon	Mount Lemmon Survey	·	2.7 km	MPC · JPL
496693	2016 EX_{109}	—	April 29, 2011	Kitt Peak	Spacewatch	VER	2.4 km	MPC · JPL
496694	2016 EV_{123}	—	October 11, 2007	Kitt Peak	Spacewatch	(1298)	2.9 km	MPC · JPL
496695	2016 EP_{124}	—	December 31, 2007	Mount Lemmon	Mount Lemmon Survey	·	1.1 km	MPC · JPL
496696	2016 ER_{124}	—	August 28, 2013	Mount Lemmon	Mount Lemmon Survey	·	1.5 km	MPC · JPL
496697	2016 EY_{124}	—	August 15, 2013	Haleakala	Pan-STARRS 1	·	1.6 km	MPC · JPL
496698	2016 EP_{126}	—	October 7, 2004	Kitt Peak	Spacewatch	KOR	1.2 km	MPC · JPL
496699	2016 ET_{126}	—	September 11, 2007	Kitt Peak	Spacewatch	·	3.1 km	MPC · JPL
496700	2016 EG_{129}	—	October 17, 2010	Mount Lemmon	Mount Lemmon Survey	·	990 m	MPC · JPL

== 496701–496800 ==
back to top

Designation			Discovery			Properties		Ref
Permanent	Provisional	Named after	Date	Site	Discoverer(s)	Category	Diam.	Ref
496701	2016 EQ_{129}	—	September 17, 2003	Kitt Peak	Spacewatch	·	1.7 km	MPC · JPL
496702	2016 EQ_{154}	—	September 10, 2007	Mount Lemmon	Mount Lemmon Survey	THM	2.5 km	MPC · JPL
496703	2016 EX_{154}	—	February 13, 2012	Haleakala	Pan-STARRS 1	·	1.0 km	MPC · JPL
496704	2016 EC_{166}	—	February 25, 2012	Mount Lemmon	Mount Lemmon Survey	·	1.6 km	MPC · JPL
496705	2016 EG_{167}	—	October 4, 2007	Mount Lemmon	Mount Lemmon Survey	VER	2.9 km	MPC · JPL
496706	2016 EB_{169}	—	September 24, 1960	Palomar	C. J. van Houten, I. van Houten-Groeneveld, T. Gehrels	KON	2.1 km	MPC · JPL
496707	2016 ET_{169}	—	March 2, 2006	Kitt Peak	Spacewatch	KOR	1.2 km	MPC · JPL
496708	2016 ED_{176}	—	January 27, 2003	Anderson Mesa	LONEOS	JUN	1.1 km	MPC · JPL
496709	2016 EL_{176}	—	February 27, 2012	Haleakala	Pan-STARRS 1	·	1.2 km	MPC · JPL
496710	2016 EZ_{179}	—	July 14, 2013	Haleakala	Pan-STARRS 1	·	1.1 km	MPC · JPL
496711	2016 EC_{180}	—	January 3, 2009	Mount Lemmon	Mount Lemmon Survey	·	570 m	MPC · JPL
496712	2016 EV_{191}	—	November 27, 2014	Haleakala	Pan-STARRS 1	·	2.1 km	MPC · JPL
496713	2016 FG_{5}	—	September 11, 2007	Mount Lemmon	Mount Lemmon Survey	·	3.8 km	MPC · JPL
496714	2016 FP_{5}	—	January 11, 2010	Mount Lemmon	Mount Lemmon Survey	·	4.1 km	MPC · JPL
496715	2016 FH_{9}	—	April 10, 2005	Kitt Peak	Spacewatch	·	3.2 km	MPC · JPL
496716	2016 FB_{21}	—	November 10, 2005	Mount Lemmon	Mount Lemmon Survey	·	1.9 km	MPC · JPL
496717	2016 FP_{27}	—	January 7, 2006	Mount Lemmon	Mount Lemmon Survey	AST	1.5 km	MPC · JPL
496718	2016 GG_{13}	—	April 24, 2011	Mount Lemmon	Mount Lemmon Survey	·	1.8 km	MPC · JPL
496719	2016 GA_{16}	—	April 30, 2006	Kitt Peak	Spacewatch	V	520 m	MPC · JPL
496720	2016 GG_{17}	—	August 29, 2005	Kitt Peak	Spacewatch	·	1.5 km	MPC · JPL
496721	2016 GY_{18}	—	February 2, 2008	Mount Lemmon	Mount Lemmon Survey	·	820 m	MPC · JPL
496722	2016 GQ_{23}	—	October 30, 2010	Mount Lemmon	Mount Lemmon Survey	·	1.5 km	MPC · JPL
496723	2016 GZ_{23}	—	April 16, 2004	Kitt Peak	Spacewatch	·	860 m	MPC · JPL
496724	2016 GX_{24}	—	November 13, 2010	Kitt Peak	Spacewatch	·	900 m	MPC · JPL
496725	2016 GE_{34}	—	April 6, 2005	Mount Lemmon	Mount Lemmon Survey	·	2.9 km	MPC · JPL
496726	2016 GO_{34}	—	October 30, 2002	Kitt Peak	Spacewatch	·	2.0 km	MPC · JPL
496727	2016 GX_{58}	—	July 14, 2013	Haleakala	Pan-STARRS 1	·	870 m	MPC · JPL
496728	2016 GM_{131}	—	September 12, 1994	Kitt Peak	Spacewatch	·	610 m	MPC · JPL
496729	2016 GZ_{170}	—	April 24, 2012	Haleakala	Pan-STARRS 1	HNS	1.0 km	MPC · JPL
496730	2016 GR_{180}	—	March 6, 1999	Kitt Peak	Spacewatch	EOS	2.3 km	MPC · JPL
496731	2016 GZ_{183}	—	January 26, 2006	Mount Lemmon	Mount Lemmon Survey	·	2.5 km	MPC · JPL
496732	2016 GS_{209}	—	April 30, 2003	Kitt Peak	Spacewatch	·	1.7 km	MPC · JPL
496733	2016 GJ_{241}	—	October 1, 2009	Mount Lemmon	Mount Lemmon Survey	·	1.8 km	MPC · JPL
496734	2016 GX_{244}	—	October 4, 2007	Kitt Peak	Spacewatch	·	4.3 km	MPC · JPL
496735	2016 GX_{245}	—	October 7, 2004	Kitt Peak	Spacewatch	·	1.9 km	MPC · JPL
496736	2016 GE_{246}	—	September 20, 2009	Mount Lemmon	Mount Lemmon Survey	·	2.2 km	MPC · JPL
496737	2016 GO_{247}	—	September 28, 2008	Mount Lemmon	Mount Lemmon Survey	·	1.8 km	MPC · JPL
496738	2016 GH_{248}	—	October 18, 2003	Kitt Peak	Spacewatch	KOR	1.4 km	MPC · JPL
496739	2016 HA_{5}	—	October 21, 1997	Kitt Peak	Spacewatch	·	3.0 km	MPC · JPL
496740	2016 HA_{12}	—	February 2, 2006	Kitt Peak	Spacewatch	HOF	3.1 km	MPC · JPL
496741	2016 HC_{15}	—	September 20, 2007	Kitt Peak	Spacewatch	·	2.4 km	MPC · JPL
496742	2016 JQ_{1}	—	March 13, 2010	Catalina	CSS	·	3.7 km	MPC · JPL
496743	2016 JJ_{9}	—	December 17, 2014	Haleakala	Pan-STARRS 1	·	2.9 km	MPC · JPL
496744	2016 JE_{10}	—	August 13, 2012	Kitt Peak	Spacewatch	·	2.9 km	MPC · JPL
496745	2016 JQ_{25}	—	November 17, 2008	Kitt Peak	Spacewatch	·	2.7 km	MPC · JPL
496746	2016 JZ_{26}	—	October 6, 2008	Kitt Peak	Spacewatch	·	2.1 km	MPC · JPL
496747	2016 JH_{37}	—	December 25, 2013	Mount Lemmon	Mount Lemmon Survey	·	3.4 km	MPC · JPL
496748	2016 NC_{13}	—	January 10, 2014	Mount Lemmon	Mount Lemmon Survey	·	3.1 km	MPC · JPL
496749	2016 NY_{30}	—	March 3, 2005	Catalina	CSS	·	2.3 km	MPC · JPL
496750	2016 NT_{54}	—	September 28, 2006	Kitt Peak	Spacewatch	·	610 m	MPC · JPL
496751	2016 PT_{37}	—	July 5, 2011	Haleakala	Pan-STARRS 1	·	3.5 km	MPC · JPL
496752	2016 SB_{14}	—	September 13, 2005	Kitt Peak	Spacewatch	·	2.7 km	MPC · JPL
496753	2016 SG_{21}	—	September 1, 2010	Mount Lemmon	Mount Lemmon Survey	·	2.5 km	MPC · JPL
496754	2016 TP_{38}	—	November 7, 2007	Kitt Peak	Spacewatch	·	1.9 km	MPC · JPL
496755	2016 TS_{62}	—	September 11, 2007	Mount Lemmon	Mount Lemmon Survey	·	1.5 km	MPC · JPL
496756	2016 UN_{49}	—	October 26, 2005	Kitt Peak	Spacewatch	·	2.0 km	MPC · JPL
496757	2016 UD_{88}	—	September 30, 2005	Mount Lemmon	Mount Lemmon Survey	·	1.9 km	MPC · JPL
496758	2016 US_{102}	—	October 1, 2005	Mount Lemmon	Mount Lemmon Survey	·	2.2 km	MPC · JPL
496759	2016 UY_{117}	—	December 28, 2005	Mount Lemmon	Mount Lemmon Survey	·	760 m	MPC · JPL
496760	2016 UE_{143}	—	November 11, 2005	Kitt Peak	Spacewatch	HYG	2.7 km	MPC · JPL
496761	2016 VQ_{10}	—	April 24, 2006	Kitt Peak	Spacewatch	·	1.2 km	MPC · JPL
496762	2016 WY_{48}	—	October 28, 2005	Mount Lemmon	Mount Lemmon Survey	MAS	520 m	MPC · JPL
496763	2016 XO_{3}	—	October 31, 2005	Catalina	CSS	·	3.2 km	MPC · JPL
496764	2017 BR_{15}	—	February 4, 2012	Haleakala	Pan-STARRS 1	EOS	2.0 km	MPC · JPL
496765	2017 BL_{21}	—	December 30, 2007	Kitt Peak	Spacewatch	·	1.6 km	MPC · JPL
496766	2017 BF_{24}	—	October 2, 2006	Mount Lemmon	Mount Lemmon Survey	·	1.5 km	MPC · JPL
496767	2017 BU_{50}	—	October 7, 2004	Kitt Peak	Spacewatch	THM	2.2 km	MPC · JPL
496768	2017 BG_{59}	—	February 20, 2006	Socorro	LINEAR	·	1.7 km	MPC · JPL
496769	2017 BQ_{84}	—	April 13, 2004	Kitt Peak	Spacewatch	·	1.6 km	MPC · JPL
496770	2017 BF_{100}	—	March 14, 2004	Kitt Peak	Spacewatch	·	1.6 km	MPC · JPL
496771	2017 BD_{108}	—	January 8, 1999	Kitt Peak	Spacewatch	·	3.7 km	MPC · JPL
496772	2017 BP_{128}	—	March 14, 2007	Mount Lemmon	Mount Lemmon Survey	·	3.4 km	MPC · JPL
496773	2017 DE_{48}	—	September 8, 2008	Kitt Peak	Spacewatch	·	870 m	MPC · JPL
496774	2017 DY_{83}	—	October 10, 2008	Mount Lemmon	Mount Lemmon Survey	·	800 m	MPC · JPL
496775	2017 DD_{108}	—	December 14, 2001	Kitt Peak	Spacewatch	·	1.5 km	MPC · JPL
496776	2017 DR_{111}	—	February 27, 2009	Mount Lemmon	Mount Lemmon Survey	·	1.3 km	MPC · JPL
496777	2017 DY_{112}	—	September 17, 2006	Kitt Peak	Spacewatch	·	1.8 km	MPC · JPL
496778	2017 DC_{114}	—	November 17, 2007	Catalina	CSS	·	1.4 km	MPC · JPL
496779	2017 DX_{115}	—	December 11, 2010	Kitt Peak	Spacewatch	·	2.5 km	MPC · JPL
496780	2017 EF_{2}	—	August 11, 2012	Haleakala	Pan-STARRS 1	H	570 m	MPC · JPL
496781	2017 EY_{5}	—	March 23, 2001	Kitt Peak	Spacewatch	·	3.5 km	MPC · JPL
496782	2017 EX_{16}	—	March 20, 2010	WISE	WISE	·	3.4 km	MPC · JPL
496783	2017 EU_{21}	—	August 29, 2002	Kitt Peak	Spacewatch	·	1.3 km	MPC · JPL
496784	2017 FR_{41}	—	January 6, 2006	Kitt Peak	Spacewatch	·	2.2 km	MPC · JPL
496785	2017 FF_{71}	—	February 25, 2006	Kitt Peak	Spacewatch	·	2.1 km	MPC · JPL
496786	2017 FD_{77}	—	August 21, 2008	Kitt Peak	Spacewatch	·	810 m	MPC · JPL
496787	2017 FN_{106}	—	March 20, 2010	Mount Lemmon	Mount Lemmon Survey	·	650 m	MPC · JPL
496788	2017 GG_{5}	—	September 18, 2007	Siding Spring	SSS	H	530 m	MPC · JPL
496789	2017 HG_{18}	—	April 24, 2003	Kitt Peak	Spacewatch	·	590 m	MPC · JPL
496790	2017 HD_{22}	—	February 21, 2006	Catalina	CSS	ERI	1.4 km	MPC · JPL
496791	2017 HP_{33}	—	April 25, 2000	Kitt Peak	Spacewatch	VER	2.9 km	MPC · JPL
496792	2017 HY_{33}	—	November 20, 2006	Kitt Peak	Spacewatch	·	2.3 km	MPC · JPL
496793	2017 HJ_{34}	—	October 2, 2010	Mount Lemmon	Mount Lemmon Survey	·	2.2 km	MPC · JPL
496794	2017 HG_{41}	—	October 24, 2014	Mount Lemmon	Mount Lemmon Survey	·	830 m	MPC · JPL
496795	2017 HR_{42}	—	April 29, 2006	Kitt Peak	Spacewatch	EOS	2.2 km	MPC · JPL
496796	2017 HD_{46}	—	August 10, 2010	Kitt Peak	Spacewatch	·	1.2 km	MPC · JPL
496797	2017 HG_{46}	—	December 29, 2008	Mount Lemmon	Mount Lemmon Survey	·	1.4 km	MPC · JPL
496798	2017 HF_{47}	—	April 14, 2007	Kitt Peak	Spacewatch	·	1.9 km	MPC · JPL
496799	2017 HX_{47}	—	February 29, 2000	Socorro	LINEAR	·	1.5 km	MPC · JPL
496800	2017 HP_{48}	—	June 23, 2001	Palomar	NEAT	·	1.7 km	MPC · JPL

== 496801–496900 ==
back to top

Designation			Discovery			Properties		Ref
Permanent	Provisional	Named after	Date	Site	Discoverer(s)	Category	Diam.	Ref
496801	2017 JU	—	March 27, 2014	Haleakala	Pan-STARRS 1	H	600 m	MPC · JPL
496802	2017 JZ	—	October 30, 2005	Kitt Peak	Spacewatch	·	1.5 km	MPC · JPL
496803	2017 JO_{1}	—	March 13, 2010	WISE	WISE	·	4.9 km	MPC · JPL
496804	2017 JD_{2}	—	November 20, 2008	Mount Lemmon	Mount Lemmon Survey	H	440 m	MPC · JPL
496805	2017 JE_{2}	—	July 15, 2004	Siding Spring	SSS	H	570 m	MPC · JPL
496806	2017 JA_{4}	—	August 22, 1995	Kitt Peak	Spacewatch	URS	3.6 km	MPC · JPL
496807	2017 JJ_{4}	—	January 30, 2012	Mount Lemmon	Mount Lemmon Survey	MAR	1.4 km	MPC · JPL
496808	2017 JM_{5}	—	December 11, 2004	Kitt Peak	Spacewatch	·	4.4 km	MPC · JPL
496809	2017 KH	—	March 5, 2013	Haleakala	Pan-STARRS 1	·	1.3 km	MPC · JPL
496810	2017 KQ_{2}	—	June 20, 2012	Kitt Peak	Spacewatch	H	630 m	MPC · JPL
496811	2017 KV_{2}	—	December 28, 2007	Kitt Peak	Spacewatch	H	670 m	MPC · JPL
496812	2017 KB_{9}	—	October 16, 2003	Kitt Peak	Spacewatch	EOS	2.0 km	MPC · JPL
496813	2017 KT_{15}	—	November 24, 2003	Kitt Peak	Spacewatch	PHO	1.1 km	MPC · JPL
496814	2017 KY_{26}	—	March 24, 2003	Kitt Peak	Spacewatch	·	2.3 km	MPC · JPL
496815	2017 KX_{29}	—	October 18, 2007	Kitt Peak	Spacewatch	·	3.2 km	MPC · JPL
496816	1989 UP	—	October 27, 1989	Kitt Peak	Spacewatch	APO · PHA	300 m	MPC · JPL
496817	1989 VB	—	November 1, 1989	Siding Spring	Parker, Q. A.	AMO · APO · PHA	400 m	MPC · JPL
496818	1993 RA	—	September 9, 1993	Kitt Peak	Spacewatch	AMO	480 m	MPC · JPL
496819	1994 XE	—	December 2, 1994	Kitt Peak	Spacewatch	·	670 m	MPC · JPL
496820	1995 FM_{15}	—	March 27, 1995	Kitt Peak	Spacewatch	·	1.2 km	MPC · JPL
496821	1995 OA_{3}	—	July 22, 1995	Kitt Peak	Spacewatch	·	1.3 km	MPC · JPL
496822	1995 OW_{11}	—	July 27, 1995	Kitt Peak	Spacewatch	·	2.5 km	MPC · JPL
496823	1995 QZ_{14}	—	August 28, 1995	Kitt Peak	Spacewatch	·	2.2 km	MPC · JPL
496824	1995 SL_{22}	—	September 19, 1995	Kitt Peak	Spacewatch	EUP	3.9 km	MPC · JPL
496825	1995 SY_{25}	—	September 19, 1995	Kitt Peak	Spacewatch	NYS	800 m	MPC · JPL
496826	1995 SR_{65}	—	September 26, 1995	Kitt Peak	Spacewatch	THM	1.7 km	MPC · JPL
496827	1995 SE_{72}	—	September 19, 1995	Kitt Peak	Spacewatch	LIX	1.9 km	MPC · JPL
496828	1995 SO_{78}	—	September 19, 1995	Kitt Peak	Spacewatch	EUN	1.0 km	MPC · JPL
496829	1995 TD_{5}	—	October 15, 1995	Kitt Peak	Spacewatch	NYS	950 m	MPC · JPL
496830	1995 UM_{81}	—	October 28, 1995	Kitt Peak	Spacewatch	·	2.8 km	MPC · JPL
496831	1995 VT_{6}	—	November 14, 1995	Kitt Peak	Spacewatch	THM	1.9 km	MPC · JPL
496832	1995 WP_{21}	—	November 17, 1995	Kitt Peak	Spacewatch	NYS	870 m	MPC · JPL
496833	1996 AM_{6}	—	January 12, 1996	Kitt Peak	Spacewatch	AGN	1.1 km	MPC · JPL
496834	1996 TQ_{6}	—	October 9, 1996	Kitt Peak	Spacewatch	·	270 m	MPC · JPL
496835	1997 GR_{1}	—	April 5, 1997	Mauna Kea	Veillet, C.	GEF	990 m	MPC · JPL
496836	1998 OL_{2}	—	July 25, 1998	Prescott	P. G. Comba	(32418)	2.0 km	MPC · JPL
496837	1998 SB_{15}	—	September 21, 1998	Socorro	LINEAR	AMO	340 m	MPC · JPL
496838	1998 SS_{40}	—	September 24, 1998	Kitt Peak	Spacewatch	KOR	1.1 km	MPC · JPL
496839	1998 WR_{30}	—	November 26, 1998	Kitt Peak	Spacewatch	KOR	1.2 km	MPC · JPL
496840	1998 YX_{31}	—	December 25, 1998	Kitt Peak	Spacewatch	·	2.6 km	MPC · JPL
496841	1999 CV_{7}	—	February 10, 1999	Socorro	LINEAR	·	2.6 km	MPC · JPL
496842	1999 RB_{30}	—	September 8, 1999	Socorro	LINEAR	·	1.8 km	MPC · JPL
496843	1999 RH_{243}	—	September 4, 1999	Kitt Peak	Spacewatch	HOF	2.5 km	MPC · JPL
496844	1999 TH_{66}	—	October 8, 1999	Kitt Peak	Spacewatch	MRX	930 m	MPC · JPL
496845	1999 TF_{71}	—	October 9, 1999	Kitt Peak	Spacewatch	MAS	630 m	MPC · JPL
496846	1999 TD_{84}	—	October 4, 1999	Kitt Peak	Spacewatch	·	810 m	MPC · JPL
496847	1999 TS_{209}	—	October 14, 1999	Socorro	LINEAR	·	1.8 km	MPC · JPL
496848	1999 TM_{294}	—	October 1, 1999	Kitt Peak	Spacewatch	·	850 m	MPC · JPL
496849	1999 TN_{319}	—	October 9, 1999	Kitt Peak	Spacewatch	·	1.3 km	MPC · JPL
496850	1999 UK_{12}	—	October 31, 1999	Kitt Peak	Spacewatch	·	830 m	MPC · JPL
496851	1999 UX_{31}	—	October 20, 1999	Kitt Peak	Spacewatch	·	960 m	MPC · JPL
496852	1999 VD_{41}	—	November 1, 1999	Kitt Peak	Spacewatch	·	1.5 km	MPC · JPL
496853	1999 VL_{42}	—	November 4, 1999	Kitt Peak	Spacewatch	NYS	980 m	MPC · JPL
496854	1999 VY_{84}	—	November 6, 1999	Kitt Peak	Spacewatch	MAS	570 m	MPC · JPL
496855	1999 VD_{116}	—	November 4, 1999	Kitt Peak	Spacewatch	·	960 m	MPC · JPL
496856	1999 VQ_{131}	—	October 30, 1999	Kitt Peak	Spacewatch	MAS	600 m	MPC · JPL
496857	1999 VD_{147}	—	November 12, 1999	Socorro	LINEAR	·	1.7 km	MPC · JPL
496858	1999 VU_{209}	—	November 12, 1999	Socorro	LINEAR	MAS	580 m	MPC · JPL
496859	1999 WB_{18}	—	November 9, 1999	Socorro	LINEAR	ERI	990 m	MPC · JPL
496860	1999 XL_{136}	—	December 12, 1999	Socorro	LINEAR	APO · PHA	410 m	MPC · JPL
496861	2000 BE_{19}	—	January 27, 2000	Socorro	LINEAR	APO +1km	870 m	MPC · JPL
496862	2000 BK_{42}	—	January 27, 2000	Kitt Peak	Spacewatch	·	1.1 km	MPC · JPL
496863	2000 CL_{59}	—	February 4, 2000	Socorro	LINEAR	·	580 m	MPC · JPL
496864	2000 CW_{108}	—	February 5, 2000	Kitt Peak	M. W. Buie	·	1.5 km	MPC · JPL
496865	2000 DP_{66}	—	February 29, 2000	Socorro	LINEAR	·	1.9 km	MPC · JPL
496866	2000 JO_{5}	—	May 5, 2000	Prescott	P. G. Comba	·	2.5 km	MPC · JPL
496867	2000 LM_{22}	—	May 29, 2000	Kitt Peak	Spacewatch	·	550 m	MPC · JPL
496868	2000 OA_{51}	—	July 31, 2000	Kitt Peak	Spacewatch	·	650 m	MPC · JPL
496869	2000 QU_{7}	—	August 24, 2000	Socorro	LINEAR	APO +1km · moon	830 m	MPC · JPL
496870	2000 QE_{227}	—	August 31, 2000	Socorro	LINEAR	·	2.6 km	MPC · JPL
496871	2000 RZ_{12}	—	September 1, 2000	Socorro	LINEAR	·	2.9 km	MPC · JPL
496872	2000 SH_{5}	—	September 22, 2000	Socorro	LINEAR	·	1.2 km	MPC · JPL
496873	2000 SJ_{9}	—	September 23, 2000	Socorro	LINEAR	·	1.9 km	MPC · JPL
496874	2000 SN_{21}	—	September 5, 2000	Socorro	LINEAR	·	610 m	MPC · JPL
496875	2000 SW_{26}	—	September 23, 2000	Socorro	LINEAR	T_{j} (2.99)	3.4 km	MPC · JPL
496876	2000 SV_{43}	—	September 6, 2000	Socorro	LINEAR	·	2.0 km	MPC · JPL
496877	2000 SD_{77}	—	September 24, 2000	Socorro	LINEAR	·	2.1 km	MPC · JPL
496878	2000 SS_{113}	—	September 24, 2000	Socorro	LINEAR	·	1.3 km	MPC · JPL
496879	2000 SN_{214}	—	September 26, 2000	Socorro	LINEAR	·	740 m	MPC · JPL
496880	2000 SH_{233}	—	September 4, 2000	Anderson Mesa	LONEOS	EUP	4.4 km	MPC · JPL
496881	2000 SP_{242}	—	August 10, 2000	Socorro	LINEAR	·	1.8 km	MPC · JPL
496882	2000 SH_{362}	—	September 24, 2000	Anderson Mesa	LONEOS	·	1.2 km	MPC · JPL
496883	2000 SF_{369}	—	September 22, 2000	Anderson Mesa	LONEOS	EUP	3.3 km	MPC · JPL
496884	2000 TW_{32}	—	October 2, 2000	Socorro	LINEAR	·	1.2 km	MPC · JPL
496885	2000 TA_{45}	—	October 1, 2000	Socorro	LINEAR	·	1.4 km	MPC · JPL
496886	2000 UN_{15}	—	October 27, 2000	Kitt Peak	Spacewatch	(2076)	710 m	MPC · JPL
496887	2000 UT_{32}	—	October 29, 2000	Kitt Peak	Spacewatch	·	590 m	MPC · JPL
496888	2000 UF_{44}	—	October 24, 2000	Socorro	LINEAR	·	1.8 km	MPC · JPL
496889	2000 UE_{67}	—	October 25, 2000	Socorro	LINEAR	·	760 m	MPC · JPL
496890	2000 VR_{23}	—	September 30, 2000	Socorro	LINEAR	·	860 m	MPC · JPL
496891	2000 WK_{159}	—	November 19, 2000	Socorro	LINEAR	PHO	1.1 km	MPC · JPL
496892	2000 XZ_{10}	—	November 30, 2000	Kitt Peak	Spacewatch	·	3.8 km	MPC · JPL
496893	2000 XG_{24}	—	November 19, 2000	Socorro	LINEAR	·	1.6 km	MPC · JPL
496894	2000 YF_{31}	—	December 30, 2000	Kitt Peak	Spacewatch	·	1.3 km	MPC · JPL
496895	2001 AF_{47}	—	January 15, 2001	Socorro	LINEAR	·	1.1 km	MPC · JPL
496896	2001 AT_{47}	—	January 4, 2001	Socorro	LINEAR	·	2.0 km	MPC · JPL
496897	2001 BZ_{15}	—	January 19, 2001	Anderson Mesa	LONEOS	·	410 m	MPC · JPL
496898	2001 CM_{47}	—	February 13, 2001	Kitt Peak	Spacewatch	·	1.9 km	MPC · JPL
496899	2001 FH_{91}	—	March 27, 2001	Haleakala	NEAT	PHO	1.1 km	MPC · JPL
496900	2001 FH_{220}	—	March 21, 2001	Kitt Peak	SKADS	MAS	660 m	MPC · JPL

== 496901–497000 ==
back to top

Designation			Discovery			Properties		Ref
Permanent	Provisional	Named after	Date	Site	Discoverer(s)	Category	Diam.	Ref
496901	2001 HB	—	April 16, 2001	Anderson Mesa	LONEOS	APO · PHA	260 m	MPC · JPL
496902	2001 QB_{143}	—	August 19, 2001	Socorro	LINEAR	·	2.4 km	MPC · JPL
496903	2001 QJ_{144}	—	August 21, 2001	Kitt Peak	Spacewatch	·	1.9 km	MPC · JPL
496904	2001 QU_{151}	—	August 25, 2001	Socorro	LINEAR	·	1.9 km	MPC · JPL
496905	2001 QO_{204}	—	August 23, 2001	Anderson Mesa	LONEOS	(5)	1.1 km	MPC · JPL
496906	2001 QT_{210}	—	August 23, 2001	Anderson Mesa	LONEOS	·	1.7 km	MPC · JPL
496907	2001 QQ_{229}	—	August 24, 2001	Anderson Mesa	LONEOS	·	930 m	MPC · JPL
496908	2001 QC_{237}	—	August 24, 2001	Socorro	LINEAR	T_{j} (2.92) · 3:2	5.5 km	MPC · JPL
496909	2001 RK_{139}	—	September 12, 2001	Socorro	LINEAR	·	750 m	MPC · JPL
496910	2001 SK_{168}	—	September 19, 2001	Socorro	LINEAR	·	2.9 km	MPC · JPL
496911	2001 ST_{188}	—	September 16, 2001	Kitt Peak	Spacewatch	·	2.5 km	MPC · JPL
496912	2001 SF_{209}	—	September 19, 2001	Socorro	LINEAR	·	570 m	MPC · JPL
496913	2001 SH_{222}	—	September 19, 2001	Socorro	LINEAR	·	2.0 km	MPC · JPL
496914	2001 SV_{229}	—	September 11, 2001	Anderson Mesa	LONEOS	·	2.5 km	MPC · JPL
496915	2001 SA_{269}	—	September 19, 2001	Kitt Peak	Spacewatch	·	2.1 km	MPC · JPL
496916	2001 SX_{288}	—	September 30, 2001	Palomar	NEAT	·	520 m	MPC · JPL
496917	2001 SD_{336}	—	August 23, 2001	Kitt Peak	Spacewatch	·	1.7 km	MPC · JPL
496918	2001 TV_{2}	—	October 6, 2001	Palomar	NEAT	·	2.2 km	MPC · JPL
496919	2001 TM_{103}	—	October 14, 2001	Socorro	LINEAR	H	600 m	MPC · JPL
496920	2001 TJ_{160}	—	October 15, 2001	Kitt Peak	Spacewatch	·	1.7 km	MPC · JPL
496921	2001 TP_{207}	—	October 11, 2001	Palomar	NEAT	·	590 m	MPC · JPL
496922	2001 TS_{260}	—	October 14, 2001	Apache Point	SDSS	·	590 m	MPC · JPL
496923	2001 UW_{57}	—	October 17, 2001	Socorro	LINEAR	fast?	2.7 km	MPC · JPL
496924	2001 UR_{64}	—	September 25, 2001	Socorro	LINEAR	·	3.9 km	MPC · JPL
496925	2001 UE_{86}	—	October 16, 2001	Kitt Peak	Spacewatch	·	2.1 km	MPC · JPL
496926	2001 UP_{112}	—	October 21, 2001	Socorro	LINEAR	·	960 m	MPC · JPL
496927	2001 UY_{156}	—	October 23, 2001	Socorro	LINEAR	H	580 m	MPC · JPL
496928	2001 UG_{177}	—	October 21, 2001	Socorro	LINEAR	·	530 m	MPC · JPL
496929	2001 UM_{186}	—	October 17, 2001	Socorro	LINEAR	·	690 m	MPC · JPL
496930	2001 UF_{203}	—	October 19, 2001	Palomar	NEAT	·	2.3 km	MPC · JPL
496931	2001 UV_{226}	—	October 16, 2001	Palomar	NEAT	·	750 m	MPC · JPL
496932	2001 UO_{229}	—	October 17, 2001	Palomar	NEAT	·	2.6 km	MPC · JPL
496933	2001 VY_{2}	—	September 10, 2001	Anderson Mesa	LONEOS	·	2.1 km	MPC · JPL
496934	2001 VA_{6}	—	October 15, 2001	Kitt Peak	Spacewatch	·	2.8 km	MPC · JPL
496935	2001 VO_{55}	—	October 19, 2001	Kitt Peak	Spacewatch	·	2.5 km	MPC · JPL
496936	2001 VO_{74}	—	November 14, 2001	Kitt Peak	Spacewatch	EUN	940 m	MPC · JPL
496937	2001 VH_{110}	—	November 12, 2001	Socorro	LINEAR	·	3.0 km	MPC · JPL
496938	2001 WF_{30}	—	October 23, 2001	Socorro	LINEAR	·	3.6 km	MPC · JPL
496939	2001 WO_{33}	—	November 17, 2001	Socorro	LINEAR	·	3.1 km	MPC · JPL
496940	2001 WZ_{33}	—	November 17, 2001	Socorro	LINEAR	·	2.9 km	MPC · JPL
496941	2001 WC_{66}	—	November 20, 2001	Socorro	LINEAR	·	950 m	MPC · JPL
496942	2001 WJ_{71}	—	November 9, 2001	Socorro	LINEAR	·	1.8 km	MPC · JPL
496943	2001 WY_{75}	—	November 20, 2001	Socorro	LINEAR	·	1.6 km	MPC · JPL
496944	2001 WX_{80}	—	November 20, 2001	Socorro	LINEAR	·	2.9 km	MPC · JPL
496945	2001 XO_{9}	—	December 9, 2001	Socorro	LINEAR	(194)	1.2 km	MPC · JPL
496946	2001 XV_{14}	—	December 9, 2001	Socorro	LINEAR	H	520 m	MPC · JPL
496947	2001 XQ_{52}	—	December 10, 2001	Socorro	LINEAR	·	2.4 km	MPC · JPL
496948	2001 XP_{122}	—	December 14, 2001	Socorro	LINEAR	·	890 m	MPC · JPL
496949	2001 XM_{244}	—	December 15, 2001	Socorro	LINEAR	·	2.9 km	MPC · JPL
496950	2001 YR_{24}	—	December 18, 2001	Socorro	LINEAR	·	930 m	MPC · JPL
496951	2001 YD_{132}	—	December 9, 2001	Socorro	LINEAR	·	1.2 km	MPC · JPL
496952	2002 AQ_{5}	—	January 9, 2002	Socorro	LINEAR	·	1.6 km	MPC · JPL
496953	2002 AU_{12}	—	January 10, 2002	Campo Imperatore	CINEOS	·	1.9 km	MPC · JPL
496954	2002 AM_{80}	—	January 8, 2002	Socorro	LINEAR	(5)	950 m	MPC · JPL
496955	2002 AQ_{108}	—	January 9, 2002	Socorro	LINEAR	·	1.0 km	MPC · JPL
496956	2002 AP_{190}	—	January 11, 2002	Kitt Peak	Spacewatch	·	2.0 km	MPC · JPL
496957	2002 CX_{35}	—	January 13, 2002	Socorro	LINEAR	·	1.7 km	MPC · JPL
496958	2002 CU_{127}	—	February 7, 2002	Socorro	LINEAR	T_{j} (2.97)	3.7 km	MPC · JPL
496959	2002 CP_{246}	—	January 14, 2002	Kitt Peak	Spacewatch	·	1.1 km	MPC · JPL
496960	2002 EX_{57}	—	February 11, 2002	Socorro	LINEAR	·	1.9 km	MPC · JPL
496961	2002 GQ_{86}	—	April 10, 2002	Socorro	LINEAR	·	1.1 km	MPC · JPL
496962	2002 GP_{186}	—	April 8, 2002	Palomar	NEAT	APO	180 m	MPC · JPL
496963	2002 NL_{60}	—	July 14, 2002	Palomar	NEAT	·	960 m	MPC · JPL
496964	2002 OM_{30}	—	July 22, 2002	Palomar	NEAT	·	920 m	MPC · JPL
496965	2002 PQ_{40}	—	August 10, 2002	Socorro	LINEAR	·	1.4 km	MPC · JPL
496966	2002 PG_{83}	—	August 10, 2002	Socorro	LINEAR	·	1.2 km	MPC · JPL
496967	2002 PL_{155}	—	August 8, 2002	Palomar	S. F. Hönig	·	980 m	MPC · JPL
496968	2002 PQ_{167}	—	August 8, 2002	Palomar	NEAT	MAS	580 m	MPC · JPL
496969	2002 PR_{172}	—	August 15, 2002	Palomar	NEAT	·	780 m	MPC · JPL
496970	2002 QV_{5}	—	August 17, 2002	Palomar	NEAT	·	1.1 km	MPC · JPL
496971	2002 QO_{32}	—	August 29, 2002	Palomar	NEAT	·	1.0 km	MPC · JPL
496972	2002 QU_{32}	—	August 29, 2002	Palomar	NEAT	·	1.0 km	MPC · JPL
496973	2002 QD_{70}	—	August 18, 2002	Palomar	NEAT	·	950 m	MPC · JPL
496974	2002 QD_{81}	—	August 17, 2002	Palomar	NEAT	·	780 m	MPC · JPL
496975	2002 QW_{82}	—	August 16, 2002	Palomar	NEAT	·	780 m	MPC · JPL
496976	2002 QH_{100}	—	August 29, 2002	Palomar	NEAT	MAS	550 m	MPC · JPL
496977	2002 QT_{107}	—	August 27, 2002	Palomar	NEAT	·	1.0 km	MPC · JPL
496978	2002 QN_{112}	—	August 17, 2002	Palomar	NEAT	·	1.9 km	MPC · JPL
496979	2002 QD_{132}	—	August 16, 2002	Palomar	NEAT	NYS	790 m	MPC · JPL
496980	2002 QQ_{138}	—	August 17, 2002	Palomar	NEAT	·	850 m	MPC · JPL
496981	2002 RP_{28}	—	September 5, 2002	Socorro	LINEAR	AMO · APO	190 m	MPC · JPL
496982	2002 RT_{70}	—	September 4, 2002	Palomar	NEAT	·	1.8 km	MPC · JPL
496983	2002 RS_{79}	—	September 5, 2002	Socorro	LINEAR	·	1.5 km	MPC · JPL
496984	2002 RX_{131}	—	September 11, 2002	Palomar	NEAT	·	930 m	MPC · JPL
496985	2002 RJ_{146}	—	September 11, 2002	Palomar	NEAT	NYS	1.1 km	MPC · JPL
496986	2002 RL_{170}	—	September 13, 2002	Palomar	NEAT	·	1.2 km	MPC · JPL
496987	2002 RR_{174}	—	September 13, 2002	Palomar	NEAT	·	1.1 km	MPC · JPL
496988	2002 RB_{209}	—	September 14, 2002	Palomar	NEAT	·	910 m	MPC · JPL
496989	2002 RC_{211}	—	September 13, 2002	Palomar	NEAT	·	1.5 km	MPC · JPL
496990	2002 RR_{240}	—	September 14, 2002	Palomar	R. Matson	·	700 m	MPC · JPL
496991	2002 RD_{253}	—	September 14, 2002	Palomar	NEAT	·	1.0 km	MPC · JPL
496992	2002 RQ_{265}	—	September 5, 2002	Haleakala	NEAT	T_{j} (2.99) · 3:2	4.4 km	MPC · JPL
496993	2002 RL_{281}	—	September 12, 2002	Palomar	NEAT	KOR	1.2 km	MPC · JPL
496994	2002 TS_{190}	—	October 13, 2002	Palomar	NEAT	·	590 m	MPC · JPL
496995	2002 TF_{243}	—	October 9, 2002	Kitt Peak	Spacewatch	·	1.1 km	MPC · JPL
496996	2002 TF_{325}	—	October 5, 2002	Apache Point	SDSS	·	1.6 km	MPC · JPL
496997	2002 TV_{330}	—	October 5, 2002	Apache Point	SDSS	·	1 km	MPC · JPL
496998	2002 TF_{378}	—	October 4, 2002	Palomar	NEAT	3:2 · SHU	4.6 km	MPC · JPL
496999	2002 TU_{379}	—	October 6, 2002	Palomar	NEAT	·	1.3 km	MPC · JPL
497000	2002 UL_{9}	—	October 29, 2002	Socorro	LINEAR	·	3.3 km	MPC · JPL

back to top
