= List of Jupiter trojans (Greek camp) (400001–500000) =

This is a partial list of Jupiter's L_{4} trojans (60° ahead of Jupiter) with numbers 400001–500000. If available, an object's mean diameter is taken from the NEOWISE data release, which the Small-Body Database has also adopted. Mean diameters are rounded to two significant figures if smaller than 100 kilometers. Estimates are in italics and calculated from a magnitude-to-diameter conversion, using an assumed albedo of 0.057.

== 400001–500000 ==
This list contains 391 objects sorted in numerical order.

Designation	Discovery			Orbital description					Diam.	Remarks	Refs
Designation	Date	Observer	Site	a (AU)	e	i (°)	q (AU)	Q (AU)	Diam.	Remarks	Refs
(401446) 2013 CY_{135}	27 January 2010	WISE	WISE	5.217	0.043	24.3	4.994	5.440	11 km	–	catalog · MPC · JPL
(403913) 2011 YQ_{56}	29 December 2011	Spacewatch	Kitt Peak	5.184	0.038	5.5	4.985	5.384	7.9 km	–	catalog · MPC · JPL
(404683) 2014 HJ_{170}	5 January 2000	Spacewatch	Kitt Peak	5.214	0.102	9.4	4.683	5.746	8.5 km	–	catalog · MPC · JPL
(412432) 2014 EG_{31}	14 December 2010	MLS	Mount Lemmon	5.157	0.020	8.3	5.055	5.260	8.7 km	–	catalog · MPC · JPL
(412477) 2014 HR_{147}	6 September 2008	Spacewatch	Kitt Peak	5.272	0.058	20.6	4.968	5.576	11 km	–	catalog · MPC · JPL
(420752) 2013 AN_{91}	6 November 2010	CSS	Catalina	5.210	0.042	17.2	4.992	5.428	12 km	–	catalog · MPC · JPL
(420753) 2013 AW_{131}	26 June 2007	Spacewatch	Kitt Peak	5.207	0.052	19.4	4.938	5.475	11 km	–	catalog · MPC · JPL
(421434) 2014 DS_{119}	16 September 2009	Spacewatch	Kitt Peak	5.173	0.067	8.6	4.828	5.517	8.0 km	–	catalog · MPC · JPL
(423407) 2005 MN_{5}	4 June 2005	Spacewatch	Kitt Peak	5.222	0.019	24.4	5.124	5.319	12 km	–	catalog · MPC · JPL
(425348) 2010 BY_{34}	6 September 2008	Spacewatch	Kitt Peak	5.151	0.060	20.1	4.842	5.460	10 km	–	catalog · MPC · JPL
(425536) 2010 PE_{26}	10 August 2010	Spacewatch	Kitt Peak	5.206	0.088	19.0	4.746	5.665	10 km	–	catalog · MPC · JPL
(426049) 2011 YG_{24}	12 January 2000	Spacewatch	Kitt Peak	5.179	0.079	11.2	4.772	5.587	9.3 km	–	catalog · MPC · JPL
(426992) 2014 DQ_{67}	24 April 2003	Spacewatch	Kitt Peak	5.246	0.033	8.6	5.072	5.419	8.2 km	–	catalog · MPC · JPL
(426993) 2014 DX_{123}	9 March 2002	Spacewatch	Kitt Peak	5.153	0.060	19.6	4.844	5.462	8.0 km	–	catalog · MPC · JPL
(428347) 2007 LR_{30}	11 June 2007	D. D. Balam	Mauna Kea	5.132	0.055	6.9	4.850	5.414	7.4 km	–	catalog · MPC · JPL
(428720) 2008 RY_{48}	3 September 2008	Spacewatch	Kitt Peak	5.259	0.073	14.8	4.874	5.644	8.3 km	–	catalog · MPC · JPL
(428732) 2008 RG_{99}	2 September 2008	Spacewatch	Kitt Peak	5.206	0.044	12.8	4.978	5.435	10 km	–	catalog · MPC · JPL
(428940) 2008 XA	1 December 2008	MLS	Mount Lemmon	5.221	0.128	27.2	4.554	5.889	12 km	–	catalog · MPC · JPL
(429083) 2009 RP_{8}	12 September 2009	Spacewatch	Kitt Peak	5.147	0.080	6.9	4.735	5.558	8.8 km	–	catalog · MPC · JPL
(429095) 2009 SU_{8}	16 September 2009	Spacewatch	Kitt Peak	5.207	0.062	11.1	4.886	5.528	7.3 km	–	catalog · MPC · JPL
(429113) 2009 SJ_{197}	22 September 2009	Spacewatch	Kitt Peak	5.249	0.060	19.0	4.933	5.565	11 km	–	catalog · MPC · JPL
(429132) 2009 SZ_{355}	23 September 2009	MLS	Mount Lemmon	5.128	0.088	21.4	4.678	5.577	8.0 km	–	catalog · MPC · JPL
(429153) 2009 UK_{114}	12 September 2009	Spacewatch	Kitt Peak	5.170	0.045	2.3	4.937	5.403	6.5 km	–	catalog · MPC · JPL
(429410) 2010 TZ_{138}	11 October 2010	MLS	Mount Lemmon	5.203	0.084	18.0	4.766	5.639	7.5 km	–	catalog · MPC · JPL
(429423) 2010 US_{52}	13 October 2010	MLS	Mount Lemmon	5.093	0.063	8.2	4.772	5.414	8.0 km	–	catalog · MPC · JPL
(429442) 2010 VV_{79}	3 November 2010	MLS	Mount Lemmon	5.162	0.035	10.7	4.980	5.344	11 km	–	catalog · MPC · JPL
(429758) 2011 WO_{65}	12 October 2010	MLS	Mount Lemmon	5.098	0.045	14.8	4.871	5.325	9.3 km	–	catalog · MPC · JPL
(429759) 2011 WR_{72}	21 September 2008	MLS	Mount Lemmon	5.150	0.044	20.8	4.923	5.377	14 km	–	catalog · MPC · JPL
(429864) 2012 SQ_{10}	19 September 2012	MLS	Mount Lemmon	5.160	0.058	17.3	4.860	5.459	9.4 km	–	catalog · MPC · JPL
(429969) 2013 AU_{32}	9 September 2008	MLS	Mount Lemmon	5.218	0.031	9.0	5.053	5.382	9.8 km	–	catalog · MPC · JPL
(429970) 2013 AQ_{54}	3 July 1995	Spacewatch	Kitt Peak	5.277	0.058	21.8	4.970	5.584	8.9 km	–	catalog · MPC · JPL
(429973) 2013 AH_{144}	18 September 2009	Spacewatch	Kitt Peak	5.267	0.041	14.8	5.052	5.481	7.8 km	–	catalog · MPC · JPL
(429974) 2013 BM_{26}	20 February 2002	Spacewatch	Kitt Peak	5.122	0.086	7.8	4.680	5.564	8.0 km	–	catalog · MPC · JPL
(429975) 2013 CP_{210}	10 January 2013	Spacewatch	Kitt Peak	5.209	0.078	16.4	4.805	5.614	12 km	–	catalog · MPC · JPL
(430312) 2013 XS_{11}	2 November 2010	MLS	Mount Lemmon	5.210	0.046	4.3	4.972	5.448	8.3 km	–	catalog · MPC · JPL
(430373) 2014 BS_{54}	29 July 2008	Spacewatch	Kitt Peak	5.200	0.035	1.6	5.018	5.381	8.3 km	–	catalog · MPC · JPL
(430375) 2014 DS_{26}	7 January 2002	Spacewatch	Kitt Peak	5.139	0.053	9.7	4.864	5.413	7.5 km	–	catalog · MPC · JPL
(430376) 2014 DR_{51}	6 September 2008	MLS	Mount Lemmon	5.244	0.087	9.6	4.790	5.699	7.9 km	–	catalog · MPC · JPL
(430379) 2014 GG_{48}	5 September 2007	MLS	Mount Lemmon	5.265	0.105	23.8	4.710	5.821	10 km	–	catalog · MPC · JPL
(430623) 2003 FG_{133}	26 March 2003	Spacewatch	Kitt Peak	5.190	0.023	14.2	5.072	5.308	8.7 km	–	catalog · MPC · JPL
(430738) 2004 HH_{21}	16 April 2004	Spacewatch	Kitt Peak	5.122	0.037	25.2	4.933	5.312	10 km	–	catalog · MPC · JPL
(430839) 2005 JO_{120}	10 May 2005	Spacewatch	Kitt Peak	5.106	0.036	14.7	4.924	5.288	8.2 km	–	catalog · MPC · JPL
(430851) 2005 LT_{53}	11 June 2005	Spacewatch	Kitt Peak	5.192	0.056	19.5	4.900	5.483	11 km	–	catalog · MPC · JPL
(431806) 2008 RD_{14}	24 August 2008	Spacewatch	Kitt Peak	5.291	0.030	20.7	5.134	5.448	9.0 km	–	catalog · MPC · JPL
(431807) 2008 RO_{15}	4 September 2008	Spacewatch	Kitt Peak	5.200	0.045	14.0	4.966	5.433	8.9 km	–	catalog · MPC · JPL
(431822) 2008 RC_{110}	3 September 2008	Spacewatch	Kitt Peak	5.165	0.093	19.2	4.684	5.645	6.6 km	–	catalog · MPC · JPL
(431826) 2008 RL_{126}	2 September 2008	Spacewatch	Kitt Peak	5.185	0.081	22.1	4.768	5.603	8.5 km	–	catalog · MPC · JPL
(431868) 2008 SP_{134}	23 September 2008	Spacewatch	Kitt Peak	5.261	0.039	16.6	5.055	5.468	9.8 km	–	catalog · MPC · JPL
(431875) 2008 SM_{170}	3 September 2008	Spacewatch	Kitt Peak	5.234	0.046	11.9	4.993	5.474	7.8 km	–	catalog · MPC · JPL
(431910) 2008 TB_{36}	1 October 2008	MLS	Mount Lemmon	5.208	0.086	24.2	4.757	5.658	9.9 km	–	catalog · MPC · JPL
(431935) 2008 TR_{158}	11 April 2003	Spacewatch	Kitt Peak	5.210	0.082	24.5	4.781	5.639	7.8 km	–	catalog · MPC · JPL
(432260) 2009 RD_{63}	12 September 2009	Spacewatch	Kitt Peak	5.248	0.144	12.6	4.491	6.004	8.2 km	–	catalog · MPC · JPL
(432261) 2009 RL_{64}	15 September 2009	Spacewatch	Kitt Peak	5.166	0.025	4.6	5.038	5.295	7.6 km	–	catalog · MPC · JPL
(432264) 2009 SZ_{27}	16 September 2009	Spacewatch	Kitt Peak	5.104	0.029	7.6	4.955	5.254	8.6 km	–	catalog · MPC · JPL
(432267) 2009 SC_{38}	16 September 2009	Spacewatch	Kitt Peak	5.154	0.056	16.0	4.865	5.442	10 km	–	catalog · MPC · JPL
(432271) 2009 SH_{76}	17 September 2009	Spacewatch	Kitt Peak	5.201	0.032	6.7	5.033	5.368	8.3 km	–	catalog · MPC · JPL
(432274) 2009 ST_{95}	19 September 2009	Spacewatch	Kitt Peak	5.218	0.034	13.6	5.042	5.393	7.4 km	–	catalog · MPC · JPL
(432285) 2009 SM_{209}	23 September 2009	Spacewatch	Kitt Peak	5.157	0.025	2.9	5.028	5.285	7.1 km	–	catalog · MPC · JPL
(432288) 2009 SS_{235}	18 September 2009	Spacewatch	Kitt Peak	5.313	0.074	9.2	4.918	5.708	11 km	–	catalog · MPC · JPL
(432294) 2009 SD_{272}	20 September 2009	Spacewatch	Kitt Peak	5.181	0.087	7.1	4.728	5.634	8.0 km	–	catalog · MPC · JPL
(432300) 2009 SN_{308}	17 September 2009	Spacewatch	Kitt Peak	5.246	0.115	12.7	4.642	5.851	8.5 km	–	catalog · MPC · JPL
(432301) 2009 SH_{321}	17 September 2009	Spacewatch	Kitt Peak	5.184	0.064	12.4	4.851	5.517	9.8 km	–	catalog · MPC · JPL
(432305) 2009 SY_{355}	19 September 2009	Spacewatch	Kitt Peak	5.104	0.040	9.4	4.899	5.309	7.6 km	–	catalog · MPC · JPL
(432306) 2009 SQ_{357}	25 September 2009	Spacewatch	Kitt Peak	5.232	0.054	13.7	4.950	5.514	7.1 km	–	catalog · MPC · JPL
(432324) 2009 UM_{78}	26 September 2009	Spacewatch	Kitt Peak	5.143	0.029	16.2	4.992	5.294	8.0 km	–	catalog · MPC · JPL
(432325) 2009 UL_{80}	22 October 2009	MLS	Mount Lemmon	5.132	0.058	35.4	4.836	5.429	9.3 km	–	catalog · MPC · JPL
(432340) 2009 VH_{23}	25 October 2009	Spacewatch	Kitt Peak	5.212	0.064	22.5	4.878	5.546	14 km	–	catalog · MPC · JPL
(432356) 2009 VV_{110}	10 November 2009	MLS	Mount Lemmon	5.224	0.057	24.9	4.928	5.520	12 km	–	catalog · MPC · JPL
(432362) 2009 WF_{29}	16 October 2009	MLS	Mount Lemmon	5.165	0.086	12.5	4.723	5.608	7.4 km	–	catalog · MPC · JPL
(432377) 2009 WB_{146}	21 October 2009	MLS	Mount Lemmon	5.296	0.015	25.6	5.218	5.374	14 km	–	catalog · MPC · JPL
(432392) 2009 XW_{2}	13 December 2009	MLS	Mount Lemmon	5.072	0.038	26.3	4.881	5.262	10 km	–	catalog · MPC · JPL
(432428) 2010 AH_{108}	12 January 2010	WISE	WISE	5.303	0.055	22.1	5.012	5.594	13 km	–	catalog · MPC · JPL
(432611) 2010 UV_{16}	1 October 2009	MLS	Mount Lemmon	5.274	0.042	23.5	5.054	5.494	15 km	–	catalog · MPC · JPL
(432615) 2010 UF_{78}	30 October 2010	MLS	Mount Lemmon	5.145	0.058	10.1	4.845	5.444	6.8 km	–	catalog · MPC · JPL
(432617) 2010 UL_{97}	28 October 2010	MLS	Mount Lemmon	5.219	0.099	6.2	4.700	5.738	9.4 km	–	catalog · MPC · JPL
(432625) 2010 VP_{66}	17 October 2009	MLS	Mount Lemmon	5.223	0.090	9.4	4.751	5.694	8.2 km	–	catalog · MPC · JPL
(432629) 2010 VC_{94}	28 September 2009	MLS	Mount Lemmon	5.187	0.041	8.3	4.976	5.399	7.8 km	–	catalog · MPC · JPL
(432636) 2010 VM_{161}	29 September 2009	Spacewatch	Kitt Peak	5.255	0.041	9.4	5.039	5.472	8.9 km	–	catalog · MPC · JPL
(432637) 2010 VK_{170}	15 December 1998	Spacewatch	Kitt Peak	5.193	0.006	32.9	5.161	5.226	12 km	–	catalog · MPC · JPL
(432639) 2010 VC_{185}	15 September 2009	Spacewatch	Kitt Peak	5.190	0.079	7.8	4.781	5.599	7.9 km	–	catalog · MPC · JPL
(432650) 2010 XQ_{25}	15 May 2005	MLS	Mount Lemmon	5.175	0.105	12.0	4.632	5.718	11 km	–	catalog · MPC · JPL
(432652) 2010 XG_{47}	1 November 2010	MLS	Mount Lemmon	5.195	0.107	12.3	4.640	5.750	8.1 km	–	catalog · MPC · JPL
(433269) 2013 AH_{38}	18 March 2004	Spacewatch	Kitt Peak	5.174	0.074	10.0	4.790	5.558	8.1 km	–	catalog · MPC · JPL
(433270) 2013 AA_{39}	5 January 2013	Spacewatch	Kitt Peak	5.285	0.052	16.1	5.013	5.557	11 km	–	catalog · MPC · JPL
(433271) 2013 AH_{56}	13 October 2010	MLS	Mount Lemmon	5.141	0.072	7.0	4.769	5.513	7.2 km	–	catalog · MPC · JPL
(433272) 2013 AE_{60}	10 November 2010	MLS	Mount Lemmon	5.198	0.104	7.9	4.657	5.738	7.7 km	–	catalog · MPC · JPL
(433273) 2013 AQ_{76}	10 January 2013	MLS	Mount Lemmon	5.207	0.037	33.6	5.014	5.400	14 km	–	catalog · MPC · JPL
(433274) 2013 AO_{91}	20 October 2012	MLS	Mount Lemmon	5.229	0.051	15.4	4.961	5.497	10 km	–	catalog · MPC · JPL
(433275) 2013 AT_{93}	4 September 2008	Spacewatch	Kitt Peak	5.274	0.005	6.2	5.248	5.300	10 km	–	catalog · MPC · JPL
(433276) 2013 AX_{100}	18 January 2010	WISE	WISE	5.117	0.035	20.5	4.938	5.295	10 km	–	catalog · MPC · JPL
(433277) 2013 AT_{108}	8 November 2010	MLS	Mount Lemmon	5.106	0.049	8.7	4.859	5.354	7.6 km	–	catalog · MPC · JPL
(433278) 2013 AB_{119}	20 February 2002	Spacewatch	Kitt Peak	5.221	0.114	2.9	4.626	5.816	6.8 km	–	catalog · MPC · JPL
(433279) 2013 AP_{129}	2 December 2010	MLS	Mount Lemmon	5.316	0.007	9.2	5.280	5.351	9.2 km	–	catalog · MPC · JPL
(433280) 2013 AU_{130}	5 January 2013	Spacewatch	Kitt Peak	5.170	0.037	14.1	4.978	5.361	11 km	–	catalog · MPC · JPL
(433281) 2013 AW_{130}	24 September 2009	MLS	Mount Lemmon	5.159	0.109	8.0	4.597	5.722	7.0 km	–	catalog · MPC · JPL
(433282) 2013 AR_{137}	30 October 2010	MLS	Mount Lemmon	5.244	0.051	8.3	4.976	5.512	7.0 km	–	catalog · MPC · JPL
(433283) 2013 BK	27 September 2009	MLS	Mount Lemmon	5.135	0.048	7.3	4.886	5.383	7.8 km	–	catalog · MPC · JPL
(433284) 2013 BV	16 September 2009	Spacewatch	Kitt Peak	5.235	0.050	3.3	4.976	5.495	7.2 km	–	catalog · MPC · JPL
(433285) 2013 BP_{10}	12 November 2012	MLS	Mount Lemmon	5.190	0.048	9.9	4.940	5.440	7.4 km	–	catalog · MPC · JPL
(433286) 2013 BV_{17}	24 August 2008	Spacewatch	Kitt Peak	5.194	0.072	6.4	4.823	5.566	8.0 km	–	catalog · MPC · JPL
(433287) 2013 BU_{44}	15 September 2009	Spacewatch	Kitt Peak	5.104	0.055	6.2	4.825	5.383	7.3 km	–	catalog · MPC · JPL
(433288) 2013 BL_{51}	27 September 2009	MLS	Mount Lemmon	5.183	0.092	7.1	4.704	5.662	7.9 km	–	catalog · MPC · JPL
(433289) 2013 BF_{54}	17 October 2010	MLS	Mount Lemmon	5.235	0.066	8.5	4.887	5.582	7.8 km	–	catalog · MPC · JPL
(433290) 2013 BW_{80}	16 January 2010	WISE	WISE	5.116	0.022	31.3	5.004	5.229	12 km	–	catalog · MPC · JPL
(433291) 2013 CB_{53}	29 September 2009	MLS	Mount Lemmon	5.253	0.097	8.1	4.745	5.760	7.8 km	–	catalog · MPC · JPL
(433292) 2013 CL_{141}	29 September 2009	MLS	Mount Lemmon	5.255	0.112	7.1	4.667	5.843	8.5 km	–	catalog · MPC · JPL
(433293) 2013 CW_{182}	8 November 2010	Spacewatch	Kitt Peak	5.182	0.036	8.0	4.996	5.368	8.5 km	–	catalog · MPC · JPL
(433294) 2013 CO_{197}	14 September 2007	Spacewatch	Kitt Peak	5.238	0.063	6.5	4.908	5.568	6.9 km	–	catalog · MPC · JPL
(433295) 2013 CV_{209}	29 July 2008	MLS	Mount Lemmon	5.134	0.069	6.5	4.778	5.490	7.8 km	–	catalog · MPC · JPL
(433296) 2013 DT_{7}	29 September 2009	Spacewatch	Kitt Peak	5.163	0.050	9.6	4.907	5.419	7.7 km	–	catalog · MPC · JPL
(433297) 2013 DE_{13}	26 October 2009	MLS	Mount Lemmon	5.288	0.091	8.7	4.806	5.771	7.4 km	–	catalog · MPC · JPL
(433298) 2013 ES_{2}	1 November 2010	Spacewatch	Kitt Peak	5.176	0.121	12.1	4.548	5.805	9.9 km	–	catalog · MPC · JPL
(433670) 2014 DD_{32}	18 January 2010	WISE	WISE	5.238	0.043	15.6	5.012	5.463	11 km	–	catalog · MPC · JPL
(433671) 2014 DF_{32}	28 September 2009	MLS	Mount Lemmon	5.127	0.013	8.6	5.060	5.195	7.8 km	–	catalog · MPC · JPL
(433672) 2014 DK_{32}	19 October 2010	MLS	Mount Lemmon	5.093	0.049	6.1	4.843	5.344	7.9 km	–	catalog · MPC · JPL
(433674) 2014 DH_{124}	7 August 2008	Spacewatch	Kitt Peak	5.114	0.065	8.2	4.780	5.448	7.1 km	–	catalog · MPC · JPL
(433675) 2014 DK_{125}	27 February 2014	Spacewatch	Kitt Peak	5.178	0.082	13.0	4.755	5.602	8.5 km	–	catalog · MPC · JPL
(433676) 2014 DP_{139}	25 September 2009	Spacewatch	Kitt Peak	5.182	0.119	6.0	4.564	5.800	7.6 km	–	catalog · MPC · JPL
(433677) 2014 EO_{7}	7 September 2008	MLS	Mount Lemmon	5.230	0.067	9.2	4.879	5.581	9.4 km	–	catalog · MPC · JPL
(433679) 2014 EY_{22}	8 April 2003	Spacewatch	Kitt Peak	5.162	0.053	4.9	4.888	5.436	7.1 km	–	catalog · MPC · JPL
(433681) 2014 EH_{33}	8 December 2010	Spacewatch	Kitt Peak	5.095	0.055	8.6	4.813	5.377	8.7 km	–	catalog · MPC · JPL
(433989) 2000 AZ_{213}	6 January 2000	Spacewatch	Kitt Peak	5.261	0.077	13.6	4.857	5.665	8.8 km	–	catalog · MPC · JPL
(435229) 2007 RB_{308}	10 September 2007	MLS	Mount Lemmon	5.314	0.039	7.7	5.106	5.522	7.8 km	–	catalog · MPC · JPL
(435560) 2008 RS_{9}	3 September 2008	Spacewatch	Kitt Peak	5.217	0.012	7.9	5.153	5.280	7.4 km	–	catalog · MPC · JPL
(435567) 2008 RS_{49}	29 July 2008	MLS	Mount Lemmon	5.223	0.170	12.2	4.334	6.112	9.4 km	–	catalog · MPC · JPL
(435568) 2008 RU_{49}	3 September 2008	Spacewatch	Kitt Peak	5.136	0.063	11.8	4.811	5.460	8.3 km	–	catalog · MPC · JPL
(435573) 2008 RA_{82}	4 September 2008	Spacewatch	Kitt Peak	5.175	0.022	7.3	5.061	5.288	6.5 km	–	catalog · MPC · JPL
(435582) 2008 RZ_{121}	3 September 2008	Spacewatch	Kitt Peak	5.265	0.047	21.4	5.016	5.513	8.9 km	–	catalog · MPC · JPL
(435583) 2008 RH_{122}	3 September 2008	Spacewatch	Kitt Peak	5.265	0.055	10.0	4.975	5.554	7.9 km	–	catalog · MPC · JPL
(435613) 2008 SP_{83}	27 September 2008	W. Ries	Altschwendt	5.277	0.130	13.0	4.592	5.963	8.7 km	–	catalog · MPC · JPL
(435620) 2008 SP_{107}	22 September 2008	Spacewatch	Kitt Peak	5.313	0.083	16.1	4.872	5.755	8.0 km	–	catalog · MPC · JPL
(435632) 2008 SB_{137}	23 September 2008	MLS	Mount Lemmon	5.263	0.084	8.2	4.822	5.703	8.0 km	–	catalog · MPC · JPL
(435645) 2008 SY_{224}	26 September 2008	Spacewatch	Kitt Peak	5.237	0.150	5.6	4.452	6.022	7.1 km	–	catalog · MPC · JPL
(435647) 2008 SB_{232}	28 September 2008	MLS	Mount Lemmon	5.206	0.058	7.8	4.902	5.509	7.2 km	–	catalog · MPC · JPL
(435652) 2008 SF_{263}	24 September 2008	Spacewatch	Kitt Peak	5.258	0.072	11.6	4.880	5.635	7.6 km	–	catalog · MPC · JPL
(435658) 2008 SG_{274}	19 September 2008	Spacewatch	Kitt Peak	5.275	0.066	3.2	4.926	5.623	7.3 km	–	catalog · MPC · JPL
(435659) 2008 SN_{274}	20 September 2008	MLS	Mount Lemmon	5.211	0.045	10.9	4.978	5.443	6.6 km	–	catalog · MPC · JPL
(435660) 2008 SW_{278}	25 September 2008	Spacewatch	Kitt Peak	5.239	0.045	19.0	5.003	5.475	8.0 km	–	catalog · MPC · JPL
(435733) 2008 UO_{109}	5 September 2008	Spacewatch	Kitt Peak	5.216	0.048	18.5	4.967	5.465	8.2 km	–	catalog · MPC · JPL
(435778) 2008 UK_{300}	29 September 2008	MLS	Mount Lemmon	5.201	0.067	9.7	4.852	5.551	8.6 km	–	catalog · MPC · JPL
(436057) 2009 RG_{34}	3 September 2008	Spacewatch	Kitt Peak	5.118	0.026	9.0	4.983	5.252	7.4 km	–	catalog · MPC · JPL
(436061) 2009 RR_{64}	15 September 2009	Spacewatch	Kitt Peak	5.137	0.096	8.0	4.642	5.632	6.8 km	–	catalog · MPC · JPL
(436064) 2009 RK_{73}	3 September 2008	Spacewatch	Kitt Peak	5.175	0.063	8.9	4.848	5.503	7.1 km	–	catalog · MPC · JPL
(436065) 2009 RZ_{73}	15 September 2009	Spacewatch	Kitt Peak	5.209	0.067	27.5	4.863	5.556	8.6 km	–	catalog · MPC · JPL
(436066) 2009 RK_{75}	15 September 2009	Spacewatch	Kitt Peak	5.195	0.021	11.6	5.087	5.302	7.0 km	–	catalog · MPC · JPL
(436069) 2009 SH_{48}	16 September 2009	Spacewatch	Kitt Peak	5.273	0.091	26.2	4.792	5.755	13 km	–	catalog · MPC · JPL
(436072) 2009 SA_{98}	20 September 2009	Spacewatch	Kitt Peak	5.275	0.014	6.4	5.203	5.346	8.5 km	–	catalog · MPC · JPL
(436075) 2009 SX_{120}	18 September 2009	Spacewatch	Kitt Peak	5.168	0.116	16.6	4.570	5.766	8.4 km	–	catalog · MPC · JPL
(436082) 2009 SU_{157}	20 September 2009	Spacewatch	Kitt Peak	5.180	0.107	8.8	4.624	5.736	7.2 km	–	catalog · MPC · JPL
(436084) 2009 SH_{177}	20 September 2009	Spacewatch	Kitt Peak	5.196	0.181	14.8	4.254	6.138	7.3 km	–	catalog · MPC · JPL
(436085) 2009 SB_{180}	9 September 2008	MLS	Mount Lemmon	5.228	0.028	6.2	5.082	5.374	7.2 km	–	catalog · MPC · JPL
(436097) 2009 ST_{246}	17 September 2009	Spacewatch	Kitt Peak	5.199	0.102	31.5	4.669	5.729	9.6 km	–	catalog · MPC · JPL
(436101) 2009 SM_{268}	24 September 2009	Spacewatch	Kitt Peak	5.070	0.084	8.9	4.646	5.493	6.5 km	–	catalog · MPC · JPL
(436107) 2009 SR_{319}	20 September 2009	Spacewatch	Kitt Peak	5.142	0.028	6.7	4.999	5.285	7.3 km	–	catalog · MPC · JPL
(436108) 2009 SU_{321}	21 September 2009	Spacewatch	Kitt Peak	5.251	0.068	9.5	4.894	5.607	7.2 km	–	catalog · MPC · JPL
(436113) 2009 SV_{354}	28 September 2009	MLS	Mount Lemmon	5.293	0.070	19.1	4.922	5.665	9.2 km	–	catalog · MPC · JPL
(436124) 2009 TZ_{28}	25 September 2009	Spacewatch	Kitt Peak	5.121	0.041	7.6	4.911	5.331	7.1 km	–	catalog · MPC · JPL
(436131) 2009 UG_{11}	28 September 2009	MLS	Mount Lemmon	5.257	0.057	13.8	4.958	5.556	6.5 km	–	catalog · MPC · JPL
(436139) 2009 UF_{37}	22 October 2009	MLS	Mount Lemmon	5.230	0.025	20.3	5.098	5.361	9.6 km	–	catalog · MPC · JPL
(436140) 2009 UU_{57}	23 October 2009	MLS	Mount Lemmon	5.205	0.050	20.1	4.946	5.465	11 km	–	catalog · MPC · JPL
(436142) 2009 UD_{76}	18 September 2009	Spacewatch	Kitt Peak	5.316	0.035	11.1	5.129	5.503	8.3 km	–	catalog · MPC · JPL
(436143) 2009 US_{81}	22 October 2009	MLS	Mount Lemmon	5.082	0.039	6.0	4.886	5.278	8.1 km	–	catalog · MPC · JPL
(436146) 2009 UN_{101}	23 October 2009	MLS	Mount Lemmon	5.106	0.024	6.4	4.983	5.229	6.9 km	–	catalog · MPC · JPL
(436151) 2009 VQ_{6}	29 September 2008	Spacewatch	Kitt Peak	5.345	0.007	1.3	5.305	5.385	7.1 km	–	catalog · MPC · JPL
(436157) 2009 VX_{27}	8 November 2009	CSS	Catalina	5.225	0.092	18.0	4.743	5.706	10 km	–	catalog · MPC · JPL
(436203) 2009 WD_{226}	17 November 2009	MLS	Mount Lemmon	5.307	0.061	4.1	4.986	5.629	7.4 km	–	catalog · MPC · JPL
(436204) 2009 WY_{245}	23 November 2009	Spacewatch	Kitt Peak	5.207	0.055	16.8	4.920	5.495	12 km	–	catalog · MPC · JPL
(436241) 2010 AM_{89}	8 January 2010	WISE	WISE	5.141	0.078	22.6	4.743	5.540	12 km	–	catalog · MPC · JPL
(436247) 2010 BX_{54}	17 November 2009	MLS	Mount Lemmon	5.189	0.086	20.1	4.741	5.636	11 km	–	catalog · MPC · JPL
(436255) 2010 BV_{105}	10 November 2009	MLS	Mount Lemmon	5.230	0.127	24.0	4.568	5.893	10 km	–	catalog · MPC · JPL
(436381) 2010 RP_{74}	11 September 2010	MLS	Mount Lemmon	5.197	0.098	36.6	4.687	5.708	7.8 km	–	catalog · MPC · JPL
(436382) 2010 RQ_{74}	11 September 2010	MLS	Mount Lemmon	5.170	0.052	27.7	4.903	5.437	9.3 km	–	catalog · MPC · JPL
(436388) 2010 VP_{48}	16 January 2010	WISE	WISE	5.244	0.121	16.0	4.610	5.878	10 km	–	catalog · MPC · JPL
(436391) 2010 VN_{111}	17 October 2010	MLS	Mount Lemmon	5.197	0.086	6.6	4.752	5.642	7.3 km	–	catalog · MPC · JPL
(436393) 2010 VA_{149}	6 November 2010	MLS	Mount Lemmon	5.181	0.080	17.6	4.764	5.598	8.9 km	–	catalog · MPC · JPL
(436394) 2010 VF_{172}	27 September 2009	Spacewatch	Kitt Peak	5.279	0.032	8.9	5.111	5.447	7.7 km	–	catalog · MPC · JPL
(436396) 2010 VD_{179}	11 November 2010	MLS	Mount Lemmon	5.204	0.211	26.5	4.108	6.301	9.4 km	–	catalog · MPC · JPL
(436397) 2010 VA_{186}	28 September 2009	MLS	Mount Lemmon	5.175	0.075	19.8	4.789	5.562	8.0 km	–	catalog · MPC · JPL
(436398) 2010 VA_{203}	14 October 2010	MLS	Mount Lemmon	5.192	0.079	21.4	4.782	5.603	7.9 km	–	catalog · MPC · JPL
(436401) 2010 WD_{13}	22 October 2009	MLS	Mount Lemmon	5.185	0.085	9.5	4.743	5.626	8.0 km	–	catalog · MPC · JPL
(436403) 2010 WS_{66}	29 October 2010	Spacewatch	Kitt Peak	5.258	0.041	7.8	5.045	5.472	8.1 km	–	catalog · MPC · JPL
(436405) 2010 XE_{31}	21 September 2009	Spacewatch	Kitt Peak	5.208	0.023	6.1	5.087	5.330	6.9 km	–	catalog · MPC · JPL
(436409) 2010 XW_{81}	10 November 2010	MLS	Mount Lemmon	5.291	0.076	8.8	4.891	5.690	8.0 km	–	catalog · MPC · JPL
(436752) 2011 WP_{136}	30 November 2011	Spacewatch	Kitt Peak	5.227	0.066	20.2	4.881	5.572	11 km	–	catalog · MPC · JPL
(436754) 2011 YU_{11}	4 June 2006	Spacewatch	Kitt Peak	5.234	0.065	19.5	4.894	5.573	11 km	–	catalog · MPC · JPL
(436755) 2011 YG_{13}	8 November 2010	MLS	Mount Lemmon	5.228	0.122	11.1	4.589	5.868	7.9 km	–	catalog · MPC · JPL
(436756) 2011 YA_{59}	15 December 2010	MLS	Mount Lemmon	5.208	0.093	18.1	4.726	5.690	7.9 km	–	catalog · MPC · JPL
(436758) 2012 AD_{6}	18 January 2010	WISE	WISE	5.178	0.098	17.8	4.672	5.683	10 km	–	catalog · MPC · JPL
(436760) 2012 BW_{68}	28 January 2000	Spacewatch	Kitt Peak	5.213	0.077	8.4	4.810	5.615	8.6 km	–	catalog · MPC · JPL
(437280) 2013 AV_{14}	26 November 2009	MLS	Mount Lemmon	5.198	0.077	17.8	4.800	5.596	10 km	–	catalog · MPC · JPL
(437283) 2013 AT_{96}	2 November 2010	MLS	Mount Lemmon	5.110	0.062	7.9	4.794	5.427	7.7 km	–	catalog · MPC · JPL
(437285) 2013 AU_{131}	19 September 2011	MLS	Mount Lemmon	5.221	0.011	12.9	5.162	5.280	12 km	–	catalog · MPC · JPL
(437286) 2013 AP_{132}	3 January 2013	MLS	Mount Lemmon	5.155	0.053	10.4	4.880	5.430	9.2 km	–	catalog · MPC · JPL
(437287) 2013 AY_{132}	10 October 2010	MLS	Mount Lemmon	5.187	0.042	10.2	4.971	5.402	9.1 km	–	catalog · MPC · JPL
(437288) 2013 AN_{133}	24 September 2009	MLS	Mount Lemmon	5.192	0.206	10.6	4.121	6.264	7.3 km	–	catalog · MPC · JPL
(437290) 2013 BH_{1}	6 November 2010	MLS	Mount Lemmon	5.191	0.043	9.9	4.970	5.412	7.9 km	–	catalog · MPC · JPL
(437291) 2013 BP_{2}	29 July 2010	WISE	WISE	5.161	0.197	25.8	4.142	6.179	8.5 km	–	catalog · MPC · JPL
(437292) 2013 BG_{17}	16 January 2013	MLS	Mount Lemmon	5.194	0.101	16.4	4.670	5.718	8.4 km	–	catalog · MPC · JPL
(437294) 2013 BK_{31}	3 November 2010	MLS	Mount Lemmon	5.129	0.062	8.3	4.808	5.450	6.8 km	–	catalog · MPC · JPL
(437295) 2013 BJ_{37}	7 December 2012	MLS	Mount Lemmon	5.101	0.063	4.8	4.779	5.424	7.8 km	–	catalog · MPC · JPL
(437296) 2013 BK_{40}	5 January 2013	Spacewatch	Kitt Peak	5.196	0.064	10.2	4.866	5.527	8.3 km	–	catalog · MPC · JPL
(437298) 2013 BR_{64}	28 October 2010	MLS	Mount Lemmon	5.178	0.057	3.5	4.885	5.470	7.2 km	–	catalog · MPC · JPL
(437300) 2013 BR_{71}	10 January 2013	Spacewatch	Kitt Peak	5.163	0.140	12.2	4.440	5.886	7.7 km	–	catalog · MPC · JPL
(437301) 2013 CW_{10}	13 October 2007	MLS	Mount Lemmon	5.212	0.086	37.1	4.766	5.659	12 km	–	catalog · MPC · JPL
(437302) 2013 CK_{13}	25 November 2010	MLS	Mount Lemmon	5.208	0.140	2.4	4.480	5.936	6.3 km	–	catalog · MPC · JPL
(437304) 2013 CK_{34}	18 January 2013	MLS	Mount Lemmon	5.201	0.029	10.1	5.050	5.352	7.9 km	–	catalog · MPC · JPL
(437305) 2013 CX_{39}	14 November 2010	MLS	Mount Lemmon	5.177	0.030	9.9	5.019	5.334	7.0 km	–	catalog · MPC · JPL
(437307) 2013 CG_{104}	14 November 2010	MLS	Mount Lemmon	5.159	0.050	8.4	4.899	5.418	7.0 km	–	catalog · MPC · JPL
(437308) 2013 CF_{133}	10 January 2013	Spacewatch	Kitt Peak	5.219	0.119	6.3	4.600	5.839	7.1 km	–	catalog · MPC · JPL
(437309) 2013 CY_{199}	3 December 2010	MLS	Mount Lemmon	5.224	0.025	8.8	5.092	5.357	8.0 km	–	catalog · MPC · JPL
(437310) 2013 CN_{206}	27 September 2009	Spacewatch	Kitt Peak	5.158	0.067	7.1	4.813	5.502	6.7 km	–	catalog · MPC · JPL
(437311) 2013 CF_{217}	28 September 2008	MLS	Mount Lemmon	5.256	0.081	7.9	4.832	5.681	7.5 km	–	catalog · MPC · JPL
(437312) 2013 DR_{14}	18 January 2012	MLS	Mount Lemmon	5.226	0.034	13.2	5.049	5.402	8.2 km	–	catalog · MPC · JPL
(437314) 2013 JA_{15}	17 November 2009	MLS	Mount Lemmon	5.227	0.009	13.0	5.180	5.273	8.1 km	–	catalog · MPC · JPL
(437720) 2014 DB_{110}	12 November 2010	Spacewatch	Kitt Peak	5.134	0.088	8.5	4.682	5.587	7.8 km	–	catalog · MPC · JPL
(437728) 2014 DQ_{124}	4 December 2010	MLS	Mount Lemmon	5.244	0.025	6.3	5.112	5.376	7.2 km	–	catalog · MPC · JPL
(437729) 2014 DH_{135}	27 November 2011	MLS	Mount Lemmon	5.109	0.034	7.9	4.937	5.280	7.8 km	–	catalog · MPC · JPL
(437730) 2014 DO_{137}	17 October 2009	MLS	Mount Lemmon	5.138	0.035	8.1	4.957	5.318	7.2 km	–	catalog · MPC · JPL
(437734) 2014 EE_{9}	28 September 2009	Spacewatch	Kitt Peak	5.168	0.018	13.0	5.076	5.260	8.9 km	–	catalog · MPC · JPL
(437740) 2014 EQ_{29}	11 October 2009	MLS	Mount Lemmon	5.170	0.078	6.3	4.768	5.571	7.5 km	–	catalog · MPC · JPL
(437752) 2014 FR_{42}	10 November 2010	MLS	Mount Lemmon	5.244	0.159	7.5	4.410	6.078	7.1 km	–	catalog · MPC · JPL
(437754) 2014 FK_{51}	10 November 2010	Spacewatch	Kitt Peak	5.229	0.070	17.1	4.863	5.594	9.3 km	–	catalog · MPC · JPL
(437757) 2014 GM_{3}	6 November 2010	MLS	Mount Lemmon	5.238	0.129	5.9	4.561	5.915	6.8 km	–	catalog · MPC · JPL
(437759) 2014 GG_{47}	20 January 2012	MLS	Mount Lemmon	5.152	0.056	15.2	4.863	5.440	8.6 km	–	catalog · MPC · JPL
(437760) 2014 HP_{149}	6 September 2008	Spacewatch	Kitt Peak	5.164	0.075	7.5	4.778	5.549	7.2 km	–	catalog · MPC · JPL
(437761) 2014 HG_{170}	2 January 2012	MLS	Mount Lemmon	5.229	0.092	10.8	4.748	5.710	7.3 km	–	catalog · MPC · JPL
(438507) 2007 RG_{70}	10 September 2007	Spacewatch	Kitt Peak	5.169	0.057	5.1	4.872	5.465	7.7 km	–	catalog · MPC · JPL
(438741) 2008 TG_{116}	6 October 2008	MLS	Mount Lemmon	5.228	0.033	10.2	5.054	5.403	7.4 km	–	catalog · MPC · JPL
(438747) 2008 TZ_{174}	8 October 2008	MLS	Mount Lemmon	5.131	0.020	6.3	5.030	5.231	7.2 km	–	catalog · MPC · JPL
(439002) 2010 VX_{104}	5 November 2010	MLS	Mount Lemmon	5.148	0.085	20.1	4.712	5.584	8.4 km	–	catalog · MPC · JPL
(439003) 2010 VV_{138}	23 November 1998	Spacewatch	Kitt Peak	5.269	0.183	13.3	4.302	6.236	7.9 km	–	catalog · MPC · JPL
(439197) 2012 BS_{34}	24 December 2011	MLS	Mount Lemmon	5.265	0.046	28.3	5.021	5.508	13 km	–	catalog · MPC · JPL
(439395) 2013 AZ_{150}	30 September 1997	Spacewatch	Kitt Peak	5.241	0.060	10.1	4.925	5.556	7.4 km	–	catalog · MPC · JPL
(439402) 2013 BA_{46}	8 December 2010	CSS	Catalina	5.229	0.056	16.1	4.934	5.524	10 km	–	catalog · MPC · JPL
(439731) 2015 FN_{39}	4 September 2008	Spacewatch	Kitt Peak	5.250	0.056	7.1	4.958	5.542	7.9 km	–	catalog · MPC · JPL
(439732) 2015 FB_{75}	5 September 2008	Spacewatch	Kitt Peak	5.242	0.046	18.8	5.003	5.481	11 km	–	catalog · MPC · JPL
(442173) 2010 WV_{51}	28 November 2010	MLS	Mount Lemmon	5.176	0.088	7.4	4.718	5.633	7.7 km	–	catalog · MPC · JPL
(442763) 2012 XG_{53}	18 October 2009	Spacewatch	Kitt Peak	5.160	0.090	22.3	4.698	5.622	8.7 km	–	catalog · MPC · JPL
(455417) 2003 GN_{39}	28 July 1995	Spacewatch	Kitt Peak	5.182	0.052	23.6	4.913	5.452	11 km	–	catalog · MPC · JPL
(459466) 2013 BR	6 November 2010	MLS	Mount Lemmon	5.140	0.042	8.8	4.924	5.355	8.0 km	–	catalog · MPC · JPL
(461351) 1998 WW_{37}	12 October 1998	Spacewatch	Kitt Peak	5.183	0.035	30.9	4.999	5.367	9.9 km	–	catalog · MPC · JPL
(464268) 2015 FV_{140}	17 September 2009	Spacewatch	Kitt Peak	5.236	0.025	31.7	5.102	5.369	9.9 km	–	catalog · MPC · JPL
(465284) 2007 TA_{219}	8 October 2007	MLS	Mount Lemmon	5.253	0.128	4.3	4.580	5.926	7.2 km	–	catalog · MPC · JPL
(465490) 2008 TE_{97}	6 October 2008	Spacewatch	Kitt Peak	5.156	0.058	18.7	4.855	5.457	7.3 km	–	catalog · MPC · JPL
(465650) 2009 RT_{8}	12 September 2009	Spacewatch	Kitt Peak	5.195	0.060	8.7	4.884	5.507	8.6 km	–	catalog · MPC · JPL
(465652) 2009 RA_{35}	14 September 2009	Spacewatch	Kitt Peak	5.186	0.022	20.2	5.074	5.298	9.2 km	–	catalog · MPC · JPL
(465658) 2009 RX_{62}	12 September 2009	Spacewatch	Kitt Peak	5.246	0.119	33.3	4.622	5.869	11 km	–	catalog · MPC · JPL
(465688) 2009 SE_{258}	21 September 2009	MLS	Mount Lemmon	5.102	0.062	20.0	4.785	5.420	7.1 km	–	catalog · MPC · JPL
(465900) 2010 UG_{107}	30 September 2009	MLS	Mount Lemmon	5.200	0.036	11.1	5.015	5.384	9.7 km	–	catalog · MPC · JPL
(465909) 2010 VM_{105}	28 October 2010	MLS	Mount Lemmon	5.248	0.049	24.6	4.993	5.503	8.9 km	–	catalog · MPC · JPL
(466095) 2012 BZ_{142}	15 January 2010	WISE	WISE	5.178	0.087	23.4	4.729	5.628	12 km	–	catalog · MPC · JPL
(466238) 2013 AD_{131}	8 November 2010	MLS	Mount Lemmon	5.232	0.072	10.1	4.855	5.608	7.8 km	–	catalog · MPC · JPL
(466239) 2013 BU_{16}	16 October 2009	MLS	Mount Lemmon	5.202	0.014	7.8	5.126	5.277	7.0 km	–	catalog · MPC · JPL
(466240) 2013 BJ_{39}	4 January 2013	Spacewatch	Kitt Peak	5.254	0.056	18.3	4.960	5.549	8.4 km	–	catalog · MPC · JPL
(466244) 2013 CY_{102}	1 January 2012	MLS	Mount Lemmon	5.252	0.043	10.1	5.024	5.480	7.5 km	–	catalog · MPC · JPL
(466245) 2013 CF_{104}	28 September 2009	MLS	Mount Lemmon	5.135	0.111	8.6	4.564	5.706	7.4 km	–	catalog · MPC · JPL
(466247) 2013 CT_{212}	6 February 2013	Spacewatch	Kitt Peak	5.264	0.098	21.8	4.746	5.781	10 km	–	catalog · MPC · JPL
(466916) 2015 HY_{5}	6 September 2008	Spacewatch	Kitt Peak	5.264	0.042	12.2	5.044	5.483	7.5 km	–	catalog · MPC · JPL
(466917) 2015 LW_{2}	8 November 2010	Spacewatch	Kitt Peak	5.128	0.038	17.5	4.935	5.322	9.9 km	–	catalog · MPC · JPL
(467635) 2008 RV_{54}	3 September 2008	Spacewatch	Kitt Peak	5.139	0.010	6.3	5.090	5.189	7.1 km	–	catalog · MPC · JPL
(467644) 2008 SQ_{90}	21 September 2008	Spacewatch	Kitt Peak	5.176	0.062	29.0	4.856	5.496	8.8 km	–	catalog · MPC · JPL
(467743) 2009 SB_{57}	17 September 2009	Spacewatch	Kitt Peak	5.138	0.087	7.4	4.691	5.585	7.9 km	–	catalog · MPC · JPL
(467746) 2009 SB_{143}	19 September 2009	Spacewatch	Kitt Peak	5.243	0.052	20.8	4.971	5.516	9.6 km	–	catalog · MPC · JPL
(467748) 2009 SK_{186}	17 September 2009	Spacewatch	Kitt Peak	5.268	0.078	9.5	4.860	5.677	7.9 km	–	catalog · MPC · JPL
(467750) 2009 SL_{199}	22 September 2009	Spacewatch	Kitt Peak	5.177	0.078	7.7	4.771	5.583	7.9 km	–	catalog · MPC · JPL
(467752) 2009 SP_{340}	20 September 2009	Spacewatch	Kitt Peak	5.242	0.044	10.7	5.009	5.475	7.9 km	–	catalog · MPC · JPL
(467777) 2009 WM_{24}	14 October 2009	MLS	Mount Lemmon	5.207	0.124	23.0	4.561	5.852	7.8 km	–	catalog · MPC · JPL
(467779) 2009 WT_{48}	19 November 2009	MLS	Mount Lemmon	5.129	0.014	16.9	5.055	5.203	13 km	–	catalog · MPC · JPL
(467783) 2009 WU_{149}	19 November 2009	MLS	Mount Lemmon	5.241	0.144	7.4	4.485	5.997	9.3 km	–	catalog · MPC · JPL
(467801) 2010 AS_{130}	30 September 2009	MLS	Mount Lemmon	5.220	0.063	13.7	4.892	5.548	11 km	–	catalog · MPC · JPL
(467852) 2010 VT_{151}	6 November 2010	MLS	Mount Lemmon	5.309	0.050	12.4	5.043	5.574	9.4 km	–	catalog · MPC · JPL
(467854) 2010 VQ_{177}	19 October 2010	MLS	Mount Lemmon	5.148	0.076	9.6	4.756	5.541	7.1 km	–	catalog · MPC · JPL
(467855) 2010 WE_{15}	27 November 1998	Spacewatch	Kitt Peak	5.202	0.053	8.3	4.926	5.477	7.9 km	–	catalog · MPC · JPL
(467856) 2010 WE_{31}	5 November 2010	Spacewatch	Kitt Peak	5.257	0.054	19.3	4.972	5.542	8.3 km	–	catalog · MPC · JPL
(467858) 2010 WM_{61}	10 November 2010	MLS	Mount Lemmon	5.230	0.067	18.7	4.879	5.581	8.5 km	–	catalog · MPC · JPL
(467859) 2010 XL_{33}	20 January 2010	WISE	WISE	5.231	0.042	31.9	5.009	5.453	15 km	–	catalog · MPC · JPL
(467926) 2012 AE_{16}	3 December 2010	MLS	Mount Lemmon	5.318	0.023	18.5	5.197	5.438	9.9 km	–	catalog · MPC · JPL
(467927) 2012 AY_{17}	24 September 2008	MLS	Mount Lemmon	5.228	0.095	10.7	4.734	5.722	7.3 km	–	catalog · MPC · JPL
(468001) 2012 UG_{166}	7 April 2005	MLS	Mount Lemmon	5.136	0.025	37.3	5.007	5.265	13 km	–	catalog · MPC · JPL
(468009) 2013 AS_{40}	22 September 2009	Spacewatch	Kitt Peak	5.253	0.080	3.2	4.836	5.671	7.2 km	–	catalog · MPC · JPL
(468011) 2013 AO_{103}	21 December 2012	MLS	Mount Lemmon	5.161	0.080	27.8	4.749	5.572	10 km	–	catalog · MPC · JPL
(468012) 2013 BP_{16}	13 January 2013	MLS	Mount Lemmon	5.229	0.057	2.3	4.930	5.529	6.5 km	–	catalog · MPC · JPL
(468013) 2013 BY_{17}	17 September 2009	Spacewatch	Kitt Peak	5.159	0.012	12.3	5.098	5.221	7.8 km	–	catalog · MPC · JPL
(468014) 2013 BN_{35}	17 October 2010	MLS	Mount Lemmon	5.216	0.026	7.7	5.081	5.350	8.6 km	–	catalog · MPC · JPL
(468015) 2013 BB_{54}	12 October 2010	MLS	Mount Lemmon	5.240	0.092	8.7	4.758	5.723	7.8 km	–	catalog · MPC · JPL
(468016) 2013 BU_{75}	30 November 2010	MLS	Mount Lemmon	5.216	0.037	9.2	5.021	5.410	8.4 km	–	catalog · MPC · JPL
(468118) 2014 EO_{38}	5 January 2013	Spacewatch	Kitt Peak	5.171	0.018	13.1	5.076	5.267	8.8 km	–	catalog · MPC · JPL
(468302) 2015 FO_{211}	21 September 2009	Spacewatch	Kitt Peak	5.274	0.060	9.1	4.958	5.591	9.4 km	–	catalog · MPC · JPL
(468304) 2015 HC_{7}	12 November 2010	Spacewatch	Kitt Peak	5.103	0.058	12.1	4.809	5.398	8.1 km	–	catalog · MPC · JPL
(468639) 2008 SV_{226}	28 September 2008	MLS	Mount Lemmon	5.222	0.035	26.5	5.040	5.405	7.0 km	–	catalog · MPC · JPL
(468694) 2009 UZ_{114}	12 September 2009	Spacewatch	Kitt Peak	5.301	0.083	39.0	4.860	5.742	8.0 km	–	catalog · MPC · JPL
(468700) 2009 WK_{96}	10 August 2007	Spacewatch	Kitt Peak	5.153	0.076	2.5	4.764	5.542	6.5 km	–	catalog · MPC · JPL
(468778) 2011 WY_{148}	2 December 2010	MLS	Mount Lemmon	5.234	0.087	15.6	4.778	5.690	8.1 km	–	catalog · MPC · JPL
(468780) 2011 YR_{58}	24 October 2011	MLS	Mount Lemmon	5.251	0.064	11.8	4.912	5.589	8.7 km	–	catalog · MPC · JPL
(468781) 2011 YR_{74}	31 December 2011	MLS	Mount Lemmon	5.232	0.061	30.1	4.916	5.549	14 km	–	catalog · MPC · JPL
(468782) 2012 AV_{21}	19 January 2010	WISE	WISE	5.261	0.092	25.5	4.778	5.744	8.3 km	–	catalog · MPC · JPL
(468786) 2012 BR_{58}	18 January 2012	MLS	Mount Lemmon	5.156	0.072	10.2	4.785	5.528	8.1 km	–	catalog · MPC · JPL
(468852) 2013 AJ_{92}	2 October 2009	MLS	Mount Lemmon	5.214	0.048	14.0	4.961	5.467	12 km	–	catalog · MPC · JPL
(468853) 2013 AT_{131}	7 January 2013	Spacewatch	Kitt Peak	5.153	0.065	24.0	4.818	5.488	7.8 km	–	catalog · MPC · JPL
(468854) 2013 AA_{133}	5 January 2013	Spacewatch	Kitt Peak	5.171	0.064	4.0	4.840	5.501	6.3 km	–	catalog · MPC · JPL
(468855) 2013 AK_{133}	19 January 2010	WISE	WISE	5.250	0.018	34.1	5.157	5.343	10 km	–	catalog · MPC · JPL
(468856) 2013 CK_{59}	30 October 2010	Spacewatch	Kitt Peak	5.237	0.014	8.6	5.166	5.308	10 km	–	catalog · MPC · JPL
(469163) 2015 HD_{140}	2 December 2010	MLS	Mount Lemmon	5.243	0.023	7.2	5.122	5.365	6.5 km	–	catalog · MPC · JPL
(471008) 2009 SK_{254}	16 September 2009	Spacewatch	Kitt Peak	5.163	0.046	8.9	4.923	5.402	6.9 km	–	catalog · MPC · JPL
(471059) 2009 UL_{143}	18 October 2009	MLS	Mount Lemmon	5.189	0.070	20.0	4.828	5.550	8.5 km	–	catalog · MPC · JPL
(471078) 2009 WG_{152}	27 October 2009	MLS	Mount Lemmon	5.249	0.005	29.2	5.221	5.278	10 km	–	catalog · MPC · JPL
(471214) 2010 VT_{112}	7 November 2010	Spacewatch	Kitt Peak	5.191	0.139	15.3	4.468	5.914	9.4 km	–	catalog · MPC · JPL
(471215) 2010 VM_{115}	16 November 2009	MLS	Mount Lemmon	5.249	0.091	10.5	4.773	5.725	7.9 km	–	catalog · MPC · JPL
(471503) 2011 YJ_{71}	28 January 2010	WISE	WISE	5.269	0.057	26.0	4.968	5.571	9.1 km	–	catalog · MPC · JPL
(471884) 2013 AF_{112}	9 December 2012	MLS	Mount Lemmon	5.178	0.129	24.3	4.510	5.845	8.0 km	–	catalog · MPC · JPL
(471904) 2013 CF_{11}	19 January 2013	Spacewatch	Kitt Peak	5.130	0.075	19.6	4.743	5.516	7.8 km	–	catalog · MPC · JPL
(471907) 2013 CS_{61}	2 November 2010	MLS	Mount Lemmon	5.191	0.066	9.4	4.850	5.532	8.4 km	–	catalog · MPC · JPL
(472211) 2014 EL_{26}	4 December 2010	MLS	Mount Lemmon	5.212	0.041	9.8	4.999	5.425	7.4 km	–	catalog · MPC · JPL
(473080) 2015 HP_{120}	7 January 2011	Spacewatch	Kitt Peak	5.147	0.072	10.3	4.775	5.520	9.5 km	–	catalog · MPC · JPL
(474042) 2016 GF_{237}	24 October 2009	MLS	Mount Lemmon	5.331	0.032	15.4	5.163	5.499	10 km	–	catalog · MPC · JPL
(489535) 2007 RS_{153}	10 September 2007	Spacewatch	Kitt Peak	5.148	0.027	4.1	5.008	5.288	7.7 km	–	catalog · MPC · JPL
(489934) 2008 RG_{46}	2 September 2008	Spacewatch	Kitt Peak	5.241	0.027	8.5	5.101	5.380	7.0 km	–	catalog · MPC · JPL
(489941) 2008 RO_{91}	2 September 2008	Spacewatch	Kitt Peak	5.164	0.053	18.5	4.890	5.437	7.9 km	–	catalog · MPC · JPL
(489943) 2008 RP_{103}	5 September 2008	Spacewatch	Kitt Peak	5.189	0.098	11.9	4.678	5.699	8.5 km	–	catalog · MPC · JPL
(489949) 2008 RS_{112}	5 September 2008	Spacewatch	Kitt Peak	5.193	0.096	6.1	4.694	5.693	6.8 km	–	catalog · MPC · JPL
(489951) 2008 RJ_{121}	2 September 2008	Spacewatch	Kitt Peak	5.136	0.099	4.7	4.628	5.644	6.1 km	–	catalog · MPC · JPL
(489952) 2008 RA_{123}	5 September 2008	Spacewatch	Kitt Peak	5.271	0.031	6.6	5.106	5.435	7.5 km	–	catalog · MPC · JPL
(490014) 2008 SE_{245}	5 September 2008	Spacewatch	Kitt Peak	5.338	0.028	8.5	5.188	5.488	8.2 km	–	catalog · MPC · JPL
(490036) 2008 TV_{16}	23 September 2008	Spacewatch	Kitt Peak	5.162	0.038	7.9	4.963	5.361	5.7 km	–	catalog · MPC · JPL
(490224) 2008 VV_{53}	6 November 2008	MLS	Mount Lemmon	5.173	0.061	5.1	4.858	5.487	5.6 km	–	catalog · MPC · JPL
(490404) 2009 RQ_{33}	14 September 2009	Spacewatch	Kitt Peak	5.256	0.038	3.5	5.057	5.454	6.1 km	–	catalog · MPC · JPL
(490415) 2009 SU_{35}	16 September 2009	Spacewatch	Kitt Peak	5.138	0.113	9.2	4.559	5.718	7.3 km	–	catalog · MPC · JPL
(490418) 2009 SY_{42}	16 September 2009	Spacewatch	Kitt Peak	5.135	0.063	16.5	4.812	5.459	7.1 km	–	catalog · MPC · JPL
(490446) 2009 SO_{164}	21 September 2009	Spacewatch	Kitt Peak	5.258	0.032	3.4	5.087	5.428	7.0 km	–	catalog · MPC · JPL
(490448) 2009 SJ_{184}	21 September 2009	Spacewatch	Kitt Peak	5.138	0.056	8.6	4.849	5.426	6.9 km	–	catalog · MPC · JPL
(490561) 2009 WY_{25}	24 October 2009	Spacewatch	Kitt Peak	5.248	0.165	12.9	4.380	6.115	8.6 km	–	catalog · MPC · JPL
(490608) 2009 WJ_{186}	2 June 2008	MLS	Mount Lemmon	5.199	0.114	13.7	4.606	5.792	8.3 km	–	catalog · MPC · JPL
(490763) 2010 TL_{192}	8 October 2010	Pan-STARRS 1	Haleakala	5.180	0.059	5.5	4.873	5.486	5.9 km	–	catalog · MPC · JPL
(490764) 2010 TM_{192}	16 October 2009	MLS	Mount Lemmon	5.164	0.037	13.5	4.972	5.356	8.2 km	–	catalog · MPC · JPL
(490765) 2010 TP_{192}	19 September 2009	Spacewatch	Kitt Peak	5.227	0.040	0.6	5.016	5.438	6.2 km	–	catalog · MPC · JPL
(490775) 2010 UR_{45}	13 October 2010	MLS	Mount Lemmon	5.203	0.123	8.5	4.561	5.845	7.0 km	–	catalog · MPC · JPL
(490778) 2010 UL_{56}	15 September 2009	Spacewatch	Kitt Peak	5.176	0.149	9.2	4.407	5.944	8.2 km	–	catalog · MPC · JPL
(490785) 2010 UO_{81}	31 October 2010	MLS	Mount Lemmon	5.219	0.113	2.0	4.629	5.809	6.9 km	–	catalog · MPC · JPL
(490804) 2010 VN_{89}	28 September 2009	Spacewatch	Kitt Peak	5.222	0.131	4.4	4.535	5.908	6.1 km	–	catalog · MPC · JPL
(490809) 2010 VE_{115}	7 November 2010	MLS	Mount Lemmon	5.136	0.082	7.4	4.713	5.559	6.8 km	–	catalog · MPC · JPL
(490817) 2010 VF_{142}	6 November 2010	MLS	Mount Lemmon	5.142	0.064	8.9	4.813	5.471	7.4 km	–	catalog · MPC · JPL
(490820) 2010 VA_{148}	15 September 2009	Spacewatch	Kitt Peak	5.120	0.087	7.0	4.674	5.567	6.3 km	–	catalog · MPC · JPL
(490834) 2010 VY_{224}	23 December 2012	Pan-STARRS 1	Haleakala	5.199	0.058	2.4	4.898	5.499	6.1 km	–	catalog · MPC · JPL
(490835) 2010 VA_{225}	7 September 2008	MLS	Mount Lemmon	5.238	0.002	9.5	5.225	5.250	7.7 km	–	catalog · MPC · JPL
(490839) 2010 WD_{33}	20 September 2009	Spacewatch	Kitt Peak	5.130	0.077	6.6	4.736	5.525	6.8 km	–	catalog · MPC · JPL
(490847) 2010 XT_{29}	18 September 2009	Spacewatch	Kitt Peak	5.269	0.094	4.2	4.774	5.765	6.8 km	–	catalog · MPC · JPL
(490850) 2010 XL_{55}	16 September 2009	Spacewatch	Kitt Peak	5.229	0.144	4.4	4.477	5.982	6.4 km	–	catalog · MPC · JPL
(491282) 2011 UO_{402}	1 February 2011	Pan-STARRS 1	Haleakala	5.142	0.039	18.9	4.944	5.340	8.8 km	–	catalog · MPC · JPL
(491332) 2011 WU_{134}	3 October 2010	CSS	Catalina	5.166	0.079	36.6	4.756	5.575	15 km	–	catalog · MPC · JPL
(491358) 2012 BU	15 September 2009	Spacewatch	Kitt Peak	5.193	0.194	3.5	4.188	6.198	5.8 km	–	catalog · MPC · JPL
(491403) 2012 DC_{11}	30 September 2007	Spacewatch	Kitt Peak	5.248	0.064	8.5	4.913	5.583	7.8 km	–	catalog · MPC · JPL
(491817) 2013 AF_{1}	3 January 2013	Pan-STARRS 1	Haleakala	5.207	0.046	20.5	4.967	5.446	8.9 km	–	catalog · MPC · JPL
(491834) 2013 AQ_{39}	30 October 2010	MLS	Mount Lemmon	5.136	0.054	6.2	4.861	5.411	7.1 km	–	catalog · MPC · JPL
(491868) 2013 BL_{1}	28 September 2009	Spacewatch	Kitt Peak	5.162	0.033	3.9	4.994	5.331	6.9 km	–	catalog · MPC · JPL
(491875) 2013 BC_{19}	22 December 2012	Pan-STARRS 1	Haleakala	5.157	0.052	9.6	4.889	5.425	9.9 km	–	catalog · MPC · JPL
(491882) 2013 BW_{56}	9 October 2010	Pan-STARRS 1	Haleakala	5.184	0.123	5.9	4.548	5.820	5.9 km	–	catalog · MPC · JPL
(491937) 2013 CJ_{112}	21 September 2009	MLS	Mount Lemmon	5.300	0.088	7.7	4.831	5.769	8.2 km	–	catalog · MPC · JPL
(491959) 2013 CQ_{213}	27 December 2011	MLS	Mount Lemmon	5.150	0.079	9.4	4.743	5.558	6.7 km	–	catalog · MPC · JPL
(491994) 2013 EC_{89}	15 September 2007	MLS	Mount Lemmon	5.338	0.037	2.6	5.142	5.533	6.9 km	–	catalog · MPC · JPL
(492333) 2014 DL_{56}	15 September 2009	Spacewatch	Kitt Peak	5.234	0.062	8.9	4.912	5.557	7.7 km	–	catalog · MPC · JPL
(492334) 2014 EQ_{5}	19 September 2009	Spacewatch	Kitt Peak	5.143	0.068	14.3	4.792	5.494	7.9 km	–	catalog · MPC · JPL
(492336) 2014 EX_{16}	26 September 2009	Spacewatch	Kitt Peak	5.195	0.077	3.7	4.795	5.595	7.4 km	–	catalog · MPC · JPL
(492374) 2014 HZ_{95}	26 September 2008	Spacewatch	Kitt Peak	5.219	0.042	9.6	5.000	5.438	7.2 km	–	catalog · MPC · JPL
(493472) 2014 WU_{510}	16 September 2009	Spacewatch	Kitt Peak	5.208	0.063	15.0	4.879	5.537	7.7 km	–	catalog · MPC · JPL
(493511) 2015 BM_{519}	12 August 2010	Spacewatch	Kitt Peak	5.190	0.151	22.6	4.405	5.975	9.5 km	–	catalog · MPC · JPL
(493526) 2015 FF_{40}	24 September 2008	Spacewatch	Kitt Peak	5.251	0.026	1.5	5.117	5.386	7.1 km	–	catalog · MPC · JPL
(493531) 2015 FF_{112}	13 September 2007	MLS	Mount Lemmon	5.291	0.035	6.6	5.104	5.479	9.2 km	–	catalog · MPC · JPL
(493532) 2015 FJ_{115}	15 September 2009	Spacewatch	Kitt Peak	5.173	0.030	16.5	5.020	5.326	9.5 km	–	catalog · MPC · JPL
(493533) 2015 FJ_{181}	22 October 2009	MLS	Mount Lemmon	5.238	0.037	5.2	5.045	5.430	6.6 km	–	catalog · MPC · JPL
(493534) 2015 FU_{206}	12 September 2009	Spacewatch	Kitt Peak	5.228	0.030	7.2	5.074	5.383	7.3 km	–	catalog · MPC · JPL
(493535) 2015 FJ_{227}	12 September 2009	Spacewatch	Kitt Peak	5.143	0.053	5.7	4.870	5.416	6.6 km	–	catalog · MPC · JPL
(494655) 1998 WX_{38}	15 November 1998	Spacewatch	Kitt Peak	5.227	0.081	30.9	4.804	5.651	10 km	–	catalog · MPC · JPL
(494961) 2009 SV_{235}	18 September 2009	Spacewatch	Kitt Peak	5.307	0.056	8.2	5.011	5.602	6.9 km	–	catalog · MPC · JPL
(495037) 2010 VC_{225}	7 September 2008	MLS	Mount Lemmon	5.206	0.049	11.7	4.951	5.460	7.2 km	–	catalog · MPC · JPL
(495194) 2013 BH	27 September 2012	Pan-STARRS 1	Haleakala	5.179	0.070	8.4	4.815	5.542	7.5 km	–	catalog · MPC · JPL
(496031) 2008 SR_{274}	21 September 2008	Spacewatch	Kitt Peak	5.287	0.096	6.8	4.779	5.796	8.1 km	–	catalog · MPC · JPL
(496073) 2009 RV_{47}	15 September 2009	Spacewatch	Kitt Peak	5.214	0.092	14.1	4.736	5.691	8.7 km	–	catalog · MPC · JPL
(496075) 2009 RE_{56}	4 April 2003	Spacewatch	Kitt Peak	5.219	0.033	11.5	5.049	5.389	9.2 km	–	catalog · MPC · JPL
(496166) 2010 XW_{18}	29 November 1997	Spacewatch	Kitt Peak	5.230	0.162	12.6	4.385	6.075	8.2 km	–	catalog · MPC · JPL
(496168) 2011 AC_{7}	13 December 2010	Spacewatch	Kitt Peak	5.164	0.051	6.2	4.898	5.430	7.3 km	–	catalog · MPC · JPL
(496293) 2013 AL_{55}	8 December 2012	Spacewatch	Kitt Peak	5.155	0.010	34.5	5.103	5.207	12 km	–	catalog · MPC · JPL
(496300) 2013 CV_{194}	6 September 2008	MLS	Mount Lemmon	5.149	0.083	7.0	4.722	5.575	6.5 km	–	catalog · MPC · JPL
(496302) 2013 CA_{215}	13 September 2007	MLS	Mount Lemmon	5.268	0.047	9.3	5.022	5.513	7.6 km	–	catalog · MPC · JPL
(496419) 2014 DL_{47}	25 September 2008	MLS	Mount Lemmon	5.147	0.094	7.0	4.664	5.630	7.1 km	–	catalog · MPC · JPL
(496604) 2015 DC_{136}	8 November 2010	MLS	Mount Lemmon	5.178	0.089	16.8	4.716	5.640	8.2 km	–	catalog · MPC · JPL
(496618) 2015 HE_{133}	8 October 2008	Spacewatch	Kitt Peak	5.219	0.015	3.3	5.141	5.297	6.8 km	–	catalog · MPC · JPL
(497786) 2006 SA_{387}	30 September 2006	A. C. Becker	Apache Point	5.062	0.193	3.8	4.085	6.039	4.6 km	–	catalog · MPC · JPL
(498616) 2008 RJ_{103}	5 September 2008	Spacewatch	Kitt Peak	5.199	0.111	7.8	4.620	5.778	6.8 km	–	catalog · MPC · JPL
(498691) 2008 ST_{275}	23 September 2008	MLS	Mount Lemmon	5.237	0.107	6.1	4.679	5.794	6.4 km	–	catalog · MPC · JPL
(499227) 2009 UC_{98}	23 October 2009	MLS	Mount Lemmon	5.187	0.082	18.2	4.761	5.613	7.2 km	–	catalog · MPC · JPL
(499231) 2009 UC_{112}	25 October 2009	Spacewatch	Kitt Peak	5.244	0.243	6.7	3.970	6.519	9.1 km	–	catalog · MPC · JPL

back to top
