= Siding Spring Survey =

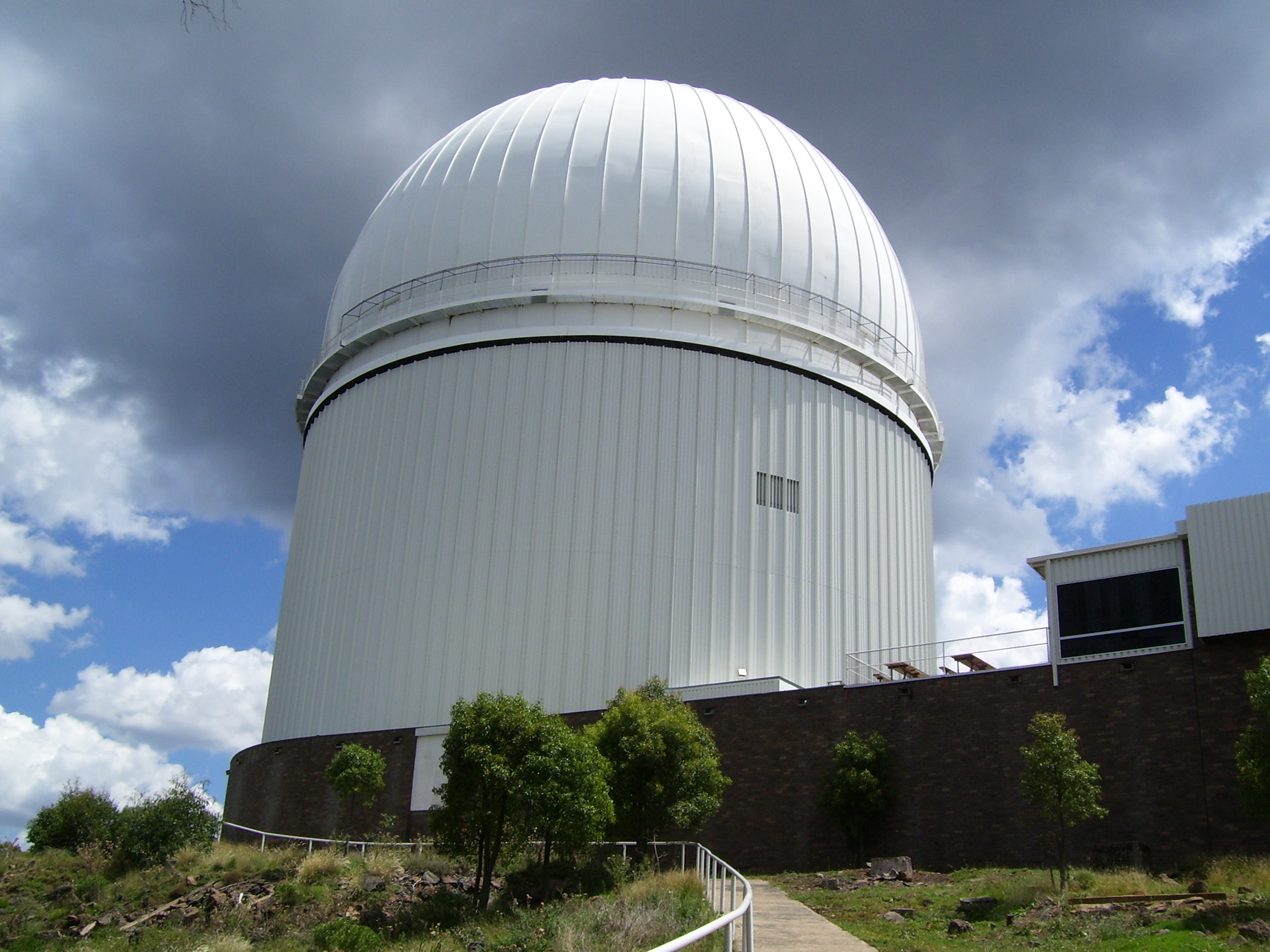
- Alternative names: SSS
- Named after: Siding Spring Observatory
- Organization: University of Arizona, Australian National University
- Observatory code: E12
- Location: Siding Spring Observatory, New South Wales, Australia
- Coordinates: 31.3°S 149.1°E
- Altitude: 1,150 m (3,770 ft)
- Established: 2004
- Closed: 2013
- Website: Official website

Telescopes
- Uppsala Southern Schmidt Telescope: Schmidt telescope

Minor planets discovered: 2758
see § List of discovered minor planets

The Siding Spring Survey (SSS) was a near-Earth object search program that used the 0.5-metre Uppsala Southern Schmidt Telescope at Siding Spring Observatory, New South Wales, Australia. It was the southern hemisphere counterpart of the Catalina Sky Survey (CSS) located in the Santa Catalina Mountains on Mount Bigelow, near Tucson, Arizona, USA. The survey was the only professional search for dangerous asteroids being made in the Southern Hemisphere.

SSS was jointly operated by the University of Arizona and the Australian National University, with funding from NASA. SSS (IAU observatory code E12) was located at Siding Spring Observatory (IAU observatory code 413) at 31.3°S 149.1°E, approximately 400 km (250 mi) north-west of Sydney at an altitude of about 1,150 metres (3,770 ft).

Images of 30 seconds' exposure time were collected using a 4×4K charge-coupled device at intervals and then compared with software.

The survey ended in July 2013 after funding was discontinued.

== Discoveries ==
Since 2004 the survey has discovered 400 potentially hazardous objects with a diameter greater than 100 m. In early January 2013, Robert H. McNaught discovered a new comet named C/2013 A1 using data collected while searching for asteroids. (308242) 2005 GO21

=== List of discovered minor planets ===
90564 Markjarnyk	12 April 2004	list
(96010) 2004 PY_{2}	3 August 2004	list
(96048) 2004 QU_{9}	21 August 2004	list
(96049) 2004 QF_{11}	21 August 2004	list
(116861) 2004 FR_{90}	20 March 2004	list
(116868) 2004 FG_{105}	24 March 2004	list
(116869) 2004 FJ_{105}	24 March 2004	list
(116909) 2004 GG_{3}	9 April 2004	list
(116912) 2004 GF_{11}	12 April 2004	list
(116917) 2004 GZ_{15}	9 April 2004	list
(116940) 2004 GX_{39}	15 April 2004	list
(116942) 2004 GG_{41}	12 April 2004	list
(116953) 2004 GA_{78}	15 April 2004	list
(116993) 2004 HZ_{45}	21 April 2004	list
(116996) 2004 HQ_{48}	22 April 2004	list
(117031) 2004 JK_{17}	12 May 2004	list
(117044) 2004 JX_{27}	15 May 2004	list
(117100) 2004 NL_{30}	14 July 2004	list
(117109) 2004 PA_{4}	3 August 2004	list
(117151) 2004 PL_{105}	12 August 2004	list
(117152) 2004 QO_{1}	16 August 2004	list
(117153) 2004 QC_{4}	19 August 2004	list
(117154) 2004 QG_{4}	19 August 2004	list
(117157) 2004 QR_{9}	21 August 2004	list
(117158) 2004 QB_{11}	21 August 2004	list

(117159) 2004 QE_{12}	21 August 2004	list
(117234) 2004 SO_{11}	16 September 2004	list
(117278) 2004 TQ_{120}	6 October 2004	list
(117659) 2005 EB_{189}	10 March 2005	list
(117676) 2005 EZ_{219}	10 March 2005	list
(117699) 2005 EK_{290}	9 March 2005	list
(117745) 2005 GP_{37}	2 April 2005	list
(117746) 2005 GS_{37}	2 April 2005	list
(117804) 2005 GK_{168}	11 April 2005	list
(117813) 2005 HO_{3}	17 April 2005	list
(117816) 2005 HB_{7}	28 April 2005	list
(117818) 2005 JS_{3}	1 May 2005	list
(117836) 2005 JR_{61}	8 May 2005	list
(117839) 2005 JD_{75}	8 May 2005	list
(117847) 2005 JK_{139}	13 May 2005	list
(120237) 2004 FQ_{85}	18 March 2004	list
(120254) 2004 GX_{14}	13 April 2004	list
(120260) 2004 GL_{20}	9 April 2004	list
(120278) 2004 HL_{17}	16 April 2004	list
(120296) 2004 JH_{17}	12 May 2004	list
(120327) 2004 NV_{10}	9 July 2004	list
(120341) 2004 QX_{12}	21 August 2004	list
(120366) 2005 NC_{56}	5 July 2005	list
(120372) 2005 PY	1 August 2005	list
(120373) 2005 PA_{2}	1 August 2005	list

(120374) 2005 PL_{2}	1 August 2005	list
(128328) 2004 FU_{15}	20 March 2004	list
(128377) 2004 JB_{28}	12 May 2004	list
(128411) 2004 LO_{16}	12 June 2004	list
(128434) 2004 NJ_{2}	9 July 2004	list
(128460) 2004 NZ_{31}	15 July 2004	list
(128476) 2004 PE_{3}	3 August 2004	list
(128477) 2004 PH_{3}	3 August 2004	list
(128478) 2004 PU_{3}	3 August 2004	list
(128571) 2004 PB_{100}	11 August 2004	list
(128577) 2004 PO_{104}	15 August 2004	list
(128579) 2004 PH_{105}	9 August 2004	list
(128581) 2004 PX_{105}	15 August 2004	list
(128582) 2004 PC_{106}	15 August 2004	list
(128591) 2004 QD_{4}	19 August 2004	list
(128594) 2004 QJ_{8}	16 August 2004	list
(128595) 2004 QK_{10}	21 August 2004	list
(128596) 2004 QS_{10}	21 August 2004	list
(128597) 2004 QA_{11}	21 August 2004	list
(128598) 2004 QO_{11}	21 August 2004	list
(128599) 2004 QP_{11}	21 August 2004	list
(128600) 2004 QT_{11}	21 August 2004	list
(128601) 2004 QS_{12}	21 August 2004	list
(128616) 2004 QA_{25}	24 August 2004	list
(128617) 2004 QB_{25}	24 August 2004	list

(128630) 2004 RM_{11}	6 September 2004	list
(128631) 2004 RN_{11}	6 September 2004	list
(128641) 2004 RE_{25}	6 September 2004	list
(128846) 2004 ST_{10}	16 September 2004	list
(128847) 2004 SM_{11}	16 September 2004	list
(128848) 2004 SY_{11}	16 September 2004	list
(129090) 2004 WB	17 November 2004	list
(129171) 2005 JE_{132}	13 May 2005	list
(129175) 2005 KT_{11}	30 May 2005	list
(129223) 2005 OQ_{14}	31 July 2005	list
(129224) 2005 OR_{14}	31 July 2005	list
(129225) 2005 OV_{14}	31 July 2005	list
(129229) 2005 PB_{1}	1 August 2005	list
(129230) 2005 PX_{1}	1 August 2005	list
(129255) 2005 QC_{69}	28 August 2005	list
(129271) 2005 QK_{161}	28 August 2005	list
(133871) 2004 JC_{23}	12 May 2004	list
(134031) 2004 WY	17 November 2004	list
(136502) 2005 JG_{132}	13 May 2005	list
(136508) 2005 KO_{8}	18 May 2005	list
(136513) 2005 NL_{93}	5 July 2005	list
(136530) 2006 GS_{37}	9 April 2006	list
(144637) 2004 FS_{90}	20 March 2004	list
(144648) 2004 FH_{105}	24 March 2004	list
(144649) 2004 FO_{105}	24 March 2004	list

(144693) 2004 GF	8 April 2004	list
(144695) 2004 GY_{2}	8 April 2004	list
(144699) 2004 GE_{11}	12 April 2004	list
(144703) 2004 GY_{15}	9 April 2004	list
(144755) 2004 HO_{3}	16 April 2004	list
(144792) 2004 HD_{46}	21 April 2004	list
(144795) 2004 HV_{47}	22 April 2004	list
(144796) 2004 HV_{48}	22 April 2004	list
(144798) 2004 HX_{50}	23 April 2004	list
(144830) 2004 JQ_{17}	12 May 2004	list
(144855) 2004 KF_{10}	19 May 2004	list
(144870) 2004 MA_{8}	29 June 2004	list
(144908) 2004 YH32	18 December 2004	list
(144993) 2005 EH_{185}	9 March 2005	list
(145006) 2005 EH_{214}	7 March 2005	list
(145077) 2005 GL_{38}	3 April 2005	list
(145090) 2005 GF_{60}	9 April 2005	list
(145111) 2005 GN_{119}	9 April 2005	list
(145134) 2005 GU_{160}	12 April 2005	list
(145144) 2005 GU_{171}	12 April 2005	list
(145150) 2005 GX_{178}	15 April 2005	list
(145163) 2005 HT_{6}	28 April 2005	list
(145164) 2005 HA_{7}	30 April 2005	list
(145184) 2005 JK_{21}	4 May 2005	list
(145185) 2005 JP_{21}	4 May 2005	list

(145186) 2005 JQ_{21}	4 May 2005	list
(145187) 2005 JW_{22}	1 May 2005	list
(145223) 2005 JS_{61}	8 May 2005	list
(145240) 2005 JN_{91}	8 May 2005	list
(145273) 2005 JH_{139}	13 May 2005	list
(145296) 2005 KC_{7}	19 May 2005	list
(145312) 2005 LB_{3}	3 June 2005	list
(145315) 2005 LR_{5}	2 June 2005	list
(145317) 2005 LA_{6}	3 June 2005	list
(145420) 2005 PP_{17}	6 August 2005	list
(145547) 2006 KC_{87}	27 May 2006	list
(145549) 2006 KJ_{124}	23 May 2006	list
(145550) 2006 KA_{125}	29 May 2006	list
(145556) 2006 MG_{14}	17 June 2006	list
(145561) 2006 OV_{2}	18 July 2006	list
(145573) 2006 OA_{13}	20 July 2006	list
(145577) 2006 PK_{1}	8 August 2006	list
(145583) 2006 PB_{14}	14 August 2006	list
(145600) 2006 QS_{11}	16 August 2006	list
(145606) 2006 QH_{29}	22 August 2006	list
(145610) 2006 QG_{37}	16 August 2006	list
(147589) 2004 GG	8 April 2004	list
(147590) 2004 GR_{1}	9 April 2004	list
(147593) 2004 GV_{14}	13 April 2004	list
(147596) 2004 GB_{25}	13 April 2004	list

(147629) 2004 HE_{48}	22 April 2004	list
(147640) 2004 JD_{12}	11 May 2004	list
(147643) 2004 JE_{17}	12 May 2004	list
(147644) 2004 JB_{23}	12 May 2004	list
(147683) 2004 OS_{14}	21 July 2004	list
(147688) 2004 PD_{70}	7 August 2004	list
(147715) 2005 KO_{6}	18 May 2005	list
(147763) 2005 QS_{21}	26 August 2005	list
(147789) 2005 QZ_{161}	28 August 2005	list
(149705) 2004 HC_{56}	24 April 2004	list
(149738) 2004 NH_{2}	9 July 2004	list
(149770) 2004 QO_{10}	21 August 2004	list
(149834) 2005 OT_{14}	31 July 2005	list
(149840) 2005 PO_{1}	1 August 2005	list
(149844) 2005 PC_{18}	8 August 2005	list
(149846) 2005 PY_{20}	15 August 2005	list
(149857) 2005 QT_{52}	27 August 2005	list
(149874) 2005 QN_{146}	28 August 2005	list
(149883) 2005 RT_{4}	1 September 2005	list
(151927) 2004 FP_{15}	16 March 2004	list
(151955) 2004 GH_{3}	9 April 2004	list
(151983) 2004 HF_{16}	16 April 2004	list
(152019) 2004 KO_{10}	20 May 2004	list
(152068) 2004 QG_{11}	21 August 2004	list
(152074) 2004 RC_{14}	6 September 2004	list

(152075) 2004 RL_{14}	6 September 2004	list
(152124) 2004 SX_{20}	20 September 2004	list
(152145) 2005 JW_{112}	9 May 2005	list
(152159) 2005 NE_{56}	10 July 2005	list
(152172) 2005 OO_{14}	31 July 2005	list
(152176) 2005 PO_{3}	6 August 2005	list
(154671) 2004 FA_{148}	16 March 2004	list
(154686) 2004 GC_{78}	9 April 2004	list
(154694) 2004 HW_{48}	22 April 2004	list
(154698) 2004 JQ_{8}	12 May 2004	list
(154701) 2004 JF_{17}	12 May 2004	list
(154718) 2004 LG_{18}	15 June 2004	list
(154725) 2004 NC_{2}	9 July 2004	list
(154749) 2004 PV_{2}	3 August 2004	list
(154750) 2004 PF_{3}	3 August 2004	list
(154751) 2004 PN_{3}	3 August 2004	list
(154798) 2004 PQ_{80}	9 August 2004	list
(154807) 2004 PP_{97}	15 August 2004	list
(154808) 2004 PF_{104}	12 August 2004	list
(154809) 2004 PW_{105}	15 August 2004	list
(154815) 2004 QE_{4}	19 August 2004	list
(154817) 2004 QX_{8}	19 August 2004	list
(154818) 2004 QA_{9}	19 August 2004	list
(154819) 2004 QN_{9}	21 August 2004	list
(154820) 2004 QU_{10}	21 August 2004	list

(154821) 2004 QN_{12}	21 August 2004	list
(154831) 2004 RY_{13}	6 September 2004	list
(154835) 2004 RT_{27}	6 September 2004	list
(154887) 2004 RN_{163}	11 September 2004	list
(154889) 2004 RB_{166}	6 September 2004	list
(155005) 2005 OP_{14}	31 July 2005	list
(155006) 2005 OU_{14}	31 July 2005	list
(155011) 2005 PR_{17}	6 August 2005	list
(155341) 2006 SA_{218}	30 September 2006	list
(157099) 2004 HC_{62}	26 April 2004	list
(157119) 2004 NF_{2}	9 July 2004	list
(157145) 2004 PW_{2}	3 August 2004	list
(157192) 2004 QB_{4}	19 August 2004	list
(157202) 2004 RG_{14}	6 September 2004	list
(157210) 2004 RQ_{27}	6 September 2004	list
(157211) 2004 RJ_{28}	6 September 2004	list
(157212) 2004 RQ_{28}	6 September 2004	list
(157213) 2004 RS_{28}	6 September 2004	list
(157214) 2004 RV_{28}	6 September 2004	list
(157215) 2004 RZ_{28}	6 September 2004	list
(157288) 2004 RU_{292}	10 September 2004	list
(157455) 2004 WV	17 November 2004	list
(157472) 2005 PM_{1}	1 August 2005	list
(158844) 2004 NK_{2}	9 July 2004	list
(158859) 2004 PL_{3}	3 August 2004	list

(158901) 2004 QW_{8}	16 August 2004	list
(158909) 2004 RB_{14}	6 September 2004	list
(158915) 2004 RX_{27}	6 September 2004	list
(158989) 2004 SJ_{10}	16 September 2004	list
(159342) 2006 JR	2 May 2006	list
(159854) 2004 FT_{15}	20 March 2004	list
(159916) 2004 WX_{2}	17 November 2004	list
(161483) 2004 GA_{87}	14 April 2004	list
(161485) 2004 HZ_{47}	22 April 2004	list
(161491) 2004 KJ_{10}	20 May 2004	list
(161493) 2004 LL_{6}	9 June 2004	list
(161500) 2004 RW_{13}	6 September 2004	list
(161519) 2004 SQ_{11}	16 September 2004	list
(161542) 2004 WF_{3}	17 November 2004	list
(161591) 2005 OG_{14}	31 July 2005	list
(161684) 2006 GD_{50}	8 April 2006	list
(161706) 2006 KG_{2}	17 May 2006	list
(161716) 2006 OS_{15}	26 July 2006	list
(161752) 2006 SX_{289}	26 September 2006	list
(161775) 2006 TG_{108}	1 October 2006	list
(161930) 2007 EG_{161}	14 March 2007	list
(161947) 2007 GD_{25}	12 April 2007	list
(161948) 2007 GU_{29}	13 April 2007	list
(161974) 2007 KP_{7}	16 May 2007	list
(164217) 2004 PT_{42}	11 August 2004	list

(164508) 2006 GH_{51}	5 April 2006	list
(164549) 2006 JE_{58}	6 May 2006	list
(167671) 2004 FR_{4}	19 March 2004	list
(167684) 2004 HY_{50}	23 April 2004	list
(167688) 2004 LZ_{10}	9 June 2004	list
(167691) 2004 QG_{9}	20 August 2004	list
(167952) 2005 EY_{219}	10 March 2005	list
(167984) 2005 GT_{37}	2 April 2005	list
(168020) 2005 JJ_{21}	4 May 2005	list
(168024) 2005 JC_{77}	9 May 2005	list
(168044) 2005 SG	21 September 2005	list
(168123) 2006 FP_{37}	24 March 2006	list
(168132) 2006 GG_{32}	6 April 2006	list
(168135) 2006 GU_{38}	6 April 2006	list
(168139) 2006 GA_{50}	7 April 2006	list
(168140) 2006 GB_{52}	8 April 2006	list
(168216) 2006 JS_{48}	8 May 2006	list
(168230) 2006 KV_{39}	23 May 2006	list
(168243) 2006 KB_{90}	22 May 2006	list
(168251) 2006 KY_{121}	30 May 2006	list
(168255) 2006 LO_{7}	6 June 2006	list
(168262) 2006 PJ_{27}	12 August 2006	list
(168265) 2006 QH_{37}	16 August 2006	list
(170868) 2004 GF_{41}	12 April 2004	list
(170877) 2004 JM_{17}	12 May 2004	list

(171081) 2005 EG_{185}	9 March 2005	list
(171093) 2005 EW_{219}	10 March 2005	list
(171129) 2005 GG_{28}	3 April 2005	list
(171189) 2005 JR_{21}	4 May 2005	list
(171239) 2005 KO_{10}	29 May 2005	list
(171293) 2006 GV_{38}	6 April 2006	list
(171309) 2006 HG_{42}	21 April 2006	list
(171345) 2006 KH_{21}	21 May 2006	list
(171346) 2006 KP_{23}	16 May 2006	list
(171347) 2006 KU_{23}	18 May 2006	list
(171358) 2006 KT_{85}	20 May 2006	list
(171363) 2006 KT_{121}	28 May 2006	list
(171366) 2006 LE_{2}	7 June 2006	list
(171368) 2006 LV_{4}	7 June 2006	list
(171373) 2006 MN_{14}	28 June 2006	list
(171380) 2006 OM_{12}	18 July 2006	list
(171382) 2006 OO_{17}	18 July 2006	list
(171383) 2006 OE_{20}	18 July 2006	list
(171390) 2006 PK_{13}	14 August 2006	list
(171391) 2006 PK_{27}	13 August 2006	list
(171397) 2006 QT_{40}	16 August 2006	list
(171402) 2006 QL_{133}	23 August 2006	list
(172787) 2004 FK_{15}	16 March 2004	list
(172815) 2004 GD_{88}	13 April 2004	list
(172955) 2005 KR_{11}	30 May 2005	list

(173005) 2006 OQ_{20}	30 July 2006	list
(173011) 2006 PL_{13}	14 August 2006	list
(173017) 2006 PO_{27}	13 August 2006	list
(173018) 2006 PS_{27}	13 August 2006	list
(173031) 2006 QM_{29}	16 August 2006	list
(175063) 2004 GS_{1}	9 April 2004	list
(175076) 2004 GZ_{40}	12 April 2004	list
(175089) 2004 HY_{47}	22 April 2004	list
(175097) 2004 JG_{17}	12 May 2004	list
(175108) 2004 LX_{10}	9 June 2004	list
(175169) 2005 ES_{119}	7 March 2005	list
(175210) 2005 GE_{28}	3 April 2005	list
(175242) 2005 HP_{3}	17 April 2005	list
(175247) 2005 JS_{21}	4 May 2005	list
(175280) 2005 KZ_{6}	19 May 2005	list
(175351) 2005 OR_{7}	30 July 2005	list
(175366) 2005 QQ_{147}	28 August 2005	list
(175388) 2006 LR_{7}	7 June 2006	list
(175392) 2006 MH_{14}	18 June 2006	list
(175395) 2006 NY	5 July 2006	list
(175409) 2006 OS_{18}	20 July 2006	list
(175416) 2006 PA_{14}	14 August 2006	list
(175469) 2006 QD_{127}	16 August 2006	list
(175622) 2006 XX_{4}	15 December 2006	list
(177561) 2004 FN_{105}	24 March 2004	list

(177580) 2004 GK_{2}	12 April 2004	list
(177593) 2004 GR_{39}	15 April 2004	list
(177594) 2004 GK_{41}	12 April 2004	list
(177604) 2004 GY_{75}	15 April 2004	list
(177605) 2004 GJ_{78}	9 April 2004	list
(177607) 2004 HD_{1}	19 April 2004	list
(177616) 2004 HX_{47}	22 April 2004	list
(177617) 2004 HR_{48}	22 April 2004	list
(177619) 2004 HB_{56}	24 April 2004	list
(177634) 2004 KL_{4}	16 May 2004	list
(177674) 2005 EF_{88}	7 March 2005	list
(177724) 2005 GZ_{223}	12 April 2005	list
(177733) 2005 JO_{21}	4 May 2005	list
(177744) 2005 JG_{44}	4 May 2005	list
(177751) 2005 JB_{75}	8 May 2005	list
(177776) 2005 KJ_{5}	18 May 2005	list
(177779) 2005 KP_{8}	18 May 2005	list
(177780) 2005 KK_{10}	29 May 2005	list
(177784) 2005 LY_{9}	2 June 2005	list
(177890) 2005 QP_{146}	28 August 2005	list
(177965) 2006 PP_{22}	14 August 2006	list
(178004) 2006 QK_{127}	16 August 2006	list
(178104) 2006 SJ_{281}	30 September 2006	list
(180652) 2004 GE_{34}	12 April 2004	list
(180672) 2004 GC_{74}	13 April 2004	list

(180681) 2004 GG_{87}	14 April 2004	list
(180704) 2004 HM_{48}	22 April 2004	list
(180708) 2004 HD_{51}	23 April 2004	list
(180717) 2004 JP_{17}	12 May 2004	list
(180756) 2004 NF_{30}	15 July 2004	list
(180757) 2004 NE_{33}	14 July 2004	list
(180775) 2004 QP_{8}	16 August 2004	list
(180776) 2004 QY_{10}	21 August 2004	list
(180790) 2004 SX_{9}	16 September 2004	list
(180873) 2005 JZ_{74}	8 May 2005	list
(180911) 2005 KN_{11}	30 May 2005	list
(180914) 2005 LM_{5}	2 June 2005	list
(180915) 2005 LO_{5}	2 June 2005	list
(180917) 2005 LZ_{9}	2 June 2005	list
(180925) 2005 LY_{23}	3 June 2005	list
(181044) 2005 PE_{1}	1 August 2005	list
(181045) 2005 PU_{1}	1 August 2005	list
(181080) 2005 QP_{31}	22 August 2005	list
(181109) 2005 QZ_{80}	28 August 2005	list
(181134) 2005 QO_{149}	28 August 2005	list
(184085) 2004 GS_{39}	15 April 2004	list
(184093) 2004 GG_{77}	13 April 2004	list
(184135) 2004 JA_{17}	12 May 2004	list
(184176) 2004 NK_{30}	13 July 2004	list
(184178) 2004 NV_{31}	15 July 2004	list

(184180) 2004 NN_{33}	15 July 2004	list
(184187) 2004 PX_{3}	3 August 2004	list
(184211) 2004 PN_{111}	15 August 2004	list
(184215) 2004 QJ_{27}	21 August 2004	list
(184245) 2004 RY_{315}	15 September 2004	list
(184248) 2004 SX_{11}	16 September 2004	list
(184359) 2005 JB_{68}	4 May 2005	list
(184360) 2005 JC_{68}	4 May 2005	list
(184377) 2005 KL_{10}	29 May 2005	list
(184378) 2005 KS_{11}	30 May 2005	list
(184497) 2005 PC_{1}	1 August 2005	list
(184602) 2005 QL_{161}	28 August 2005	list
(184615) 2005 RD_{10}	6 September 2005	list
(185010) 2006 PR_{31}	14 August 2006	list
(185021) 2006 QB_{38}	16 August 2006	list
(186840) 2004 FZ_{129}	20 March 2004	list
(186843) 2004 GV	9 April 2004	list
(186885) 2004 JY_{27}	15 May 2004	list
(186899) 2004 KN_{17}	30 May 2004	list
(186936) 2004 PA_{106}	15 August 2004	list
(186940) 2004 QZ_{8}	19 August 2004	list
(186941) 2004 QH_{11}	21 August 2004	list
(186942) 2004 QQ_{12}	21 August 2004	list
(186943) 2004 QT_{12}	21 August 2004	list
(186986) 2004 SQ_{48}	20 September 2004	list

(187088) 2005 OF_{14}	30 July 2005	list
(187114) 2005 QK_{69}	28 August 2005	list
(187143) 2005 QV_{161}	28 August 2005	list
(188448) 2004 HW_{35}	20 April 2004	list
(188450) 2004 HB_{55}	22 April 2004	list
(188452) 2004 HE_{62}	26 April 2004	list
(188505) 2004 QV_{26}	19 August 2004	list
(188539) 2004 RX_{315}	15 September 2004	list
(188607) 2005 PR_{20}	15 August 2005	list
(188630) 2005 QD_{69}	28 August 2005	list
(188641) 2005 QB_{162}	28 August 2005	list
(189232) 2004 MJ_{8}	17 June 2004	list
(189239) 2004 QR_{12}	21 August 2004	list
(189265) 2005 GN_{179}	9 April 2005	list
(189369) 2008 EO_{150}	10 March 2008	list
(189400) 2008 JY_{34}	7 May 2008	list
(189991) 2004 GR	9 April 2004	list
(190027) 2004 QB_{13}	21 August 2004	list
(190253) 2007 GX_{33}	11 April 2007	list
(191612) 2004 HT_{48}	22 April 2004	list
(191622) 2004 MK_{8}	27 June 2004	list
(191634) 2004 PQ_{3}	3 August 2004	list
(191666) 2004 PQ_{112}	3 August 2004	list
(191668) 2004 QF_{4}	19 August 2004	list
(191669) 2004 QD_{11}	21 August 2004	list

(191670) 2004 QV_{11}	21 August 2004	list
(191740) 2004 SB_{12}	16 September 2004	list
(191741) 2004 SC_{12}	16 September 2004	list
(192180) 2007 ED_{213}	14 March 2007	list
(192188) 2007 GR_{9}	8 April 2007	list
(192203) 2007 HH_{90}	22 April 2007	list
(192221) 2007 RQ_{278}	5 September 2007	list
(192269) 2008 OB_{4}	26 July 2008	list
(197564) 2004 GG_{2}	12 April 2004	list
(197567) 2004 GN_{12}	9 April 2004	list
(197575) 2004 GW_{36}	13 April 2004	list
(197630) 2004 KJ_{4}	16 May 2004	list
(197633) 2004 KD_{10}	19 May 2004	list
(197637) 2004 KB_{18}	16 May 2004	list
(197643) 2004 LO_{11}	12 June 2004	list
(197653) 2004 MH_{8}	16 June 2004	list
(197660) 2004 NE_{2}	9 July 2004	list
(197711) 2004 PB_{3}	3 August 2004	list
(197712) 2004 PS_{3}	3 August 2004	list
(197713) 2004 PZ_{3}	3 August 2004	list
(197777) 2004 PW_{45}	7 August 2004	list
(197801) 2004 PR_{65}	10 August 2004	list
(197854) 2004 QZ_{10}	21 August 2004	list
(197855) 2004 QK_{11}	21 August 2004	list
(197861) 2004 QS_{25}	26 August 2004	list

(197874) 2004 RG_{11}	6 September 2004	list
(197877) 2004 RF_{14}	6 September 2004	list
(197878) 2004 RJ_{14}	6 September 2004	list
(197879) 2004 RD_{15}	6 September 2004	list
(198035) 2004 RK_{253}	15 September 2004	list
(198434) 2004 WX	17 November 2004	list
(198436) 2004 WH_{3}	17 November 2004	list
(198801) 2005 EH_{172}	7 March 2005	list
(198831) 2005 EL_{290}	9 March 2005	list
(198844) 2005 GP_{119}	9 April 2005	list
(198846) 2005 GV_{178}	15 April 2005	list
(198851) 2005 JY_{98}	8 May 2005	list
(198877) 2005 SH_{71}	30 September 2005	list
(199656) 2006 GC_{42}	8 April 2006	list
(199667) 2006 GF_{50}	8 April 2006	list
(199734) 2006 HK_{110}	26 April 2006	list
(199771) 2006 KQ_{23}	16 May 2006	list
(199782) 2006 KZ_{89}	22 May 2006	list
(199896) 2007 FB_{39}	28 March 2007	list
(199921) 2007 GS_{29}	12 April 2007	list
(199922) 2007 GX_{31}	11 April 2007	list
(199924) 2007 GC_{34}	13 April 2007	list
(199998) 2007 JU_{39}	11 May 2007	list
(200005) 2007 KT_{7}	16 May 2007	list
(200021) 2007 NZ_{6}	15 July 2007	list

(200050) 2008 OL	25 July 2008	list
(202003) 2004 QQ_{9}	21 August 2004	list
(202004) 2004 QT_{9}	21 August 2004	list
(202008) 2004 QX_{26}	21 August 2004	list
(202013) 2004 RS_{27}	6 September 2004	list
(202014) 2004 RT_{28}	6 September 2004	list
(202070) 2004 SG_{11}	16 September 2004	list
(202174) 2004 WB_{3}	17 November 2004	list
(202353) 2005 EF_{189}	10 March 2005	list
(202400) 2005 JC_{37}	4 May 2005	list
(202589) 2006 GO_{37}	6 April 2006	list
(202651) 2006 JO_{56}	6 May 2006	list
(202673) 2006 LA_{5}	14 June 2006	list
(202703) 2007 FO_{43}	28 March 2007	list
(202709) 2007 GE_{25}	12 April 2007	list
(202749) 2007 PH_{3}	6 August 2007	list
(202753) 2007 PK_{45}	7 August 2007	list
(202786) 2008 MF_{1}	28 June 2008	list
(204289) 2004 PP_{3}	3 August 2004	list
(204591) 2005 GB_{104}	9 April 2005	list
(204624) 2005 PF_{21}	1 August 2005	list
(204708) 2006 FG_{52}	26 March 2006	list
(204740) 2006 HB_{87}	29 April 2006	list
(204750) 2006 JM_{14}	4 May 2006	list
(204771) 2006 KB_{20}	18 May 2006	list

(204773) 2006 KD_{38}	16 May 2006	list
(204774) 2006 KH_{39}	18 May 2006	list
(204777) 2006 KV_{43}	20 May 2006	list
(204787) 2006 NB_{1}	6 July 2006	list
(204811) 2007 LO_{33}	11 June 2007	list
(204815) 2007 NP_{1}	10 July 2007	list
(204869) 2007 RL_{275}	6 September 2007	list
(206887) 2004 GG_{19}	15 April 2004	list
(206906) 2004 JZ_{27}	11 May 2004	list
(206908) 2004 NW_{2}	9 July 2004	list
(206959) 2004 SQ_{10}	16 September 2004	list
(207296) 2005 GJ_{38}	3 April 2005	list
(207323) 2005 GQ_{119}	10 April 2005	list
(207365) 2005 JJ_{163}	8 May 2005	list
(207463) 2006 GW_{38}	6 April 2006	list
(207501) 2006 HQ_{111}	29 April 2006	list
(207533) 2006 KM_{23}	16 May 2006	list
(207536) 2006 KE_{38}	16 May 2006	list
(207540) 2006 KD_{56}	21 May 2006	list
(207553) 2006 LU_{4}	6 June 2006	list
(207571) 2006 PY_{13}	14 August 2006	list
(207647) 2007 KQ_{8}	22 May 2007	list
(207839) 2007 UU_{42}	16 October 2007	list
(209412) 2004 FM_{22}	16 March 2004	list
(209498) 2004 JO_{17}	12 May 2004	list

(209729) 2005 EF_{162}	9 March 2005	list
(209861) 2005 JD_{37}	4 May 2005	list
(209965) 2006 GN_{50}	9 April 2006	list
(210027) 2006 KY_{113}	22 May 2006	list
(210042) 2006 OQ_{19}	20 July 2006	list
(210071) 2006 QF_{12}	16 August 2006	list
(210191) 2007 OT_{6}	22 July 2007	list
(211860) 2004 GH_{20}	15 April 2004	list
(211893) 2004 JW_{27}	15 May 2004	list
(211908) 2004 NK_{33}	12 July 2004	list
(212217) 2005 GL_{215}	11 April 2005	list
(212268) 2005 JH_{132}	13 May 2005	list
(212322) 2005 QM_{146}	28 August 2005	list
(212414) 2006 KB_{69}	20 May 2006	list
(212417) 2006 KJ_{103}	28 May 2006	list
(212433) 2006 OP_{15}	26 July 2006	list
(212436) 2006 OA_{20}	31 July 2006	list
(212437) 2006 PA_{13}	14 August 2006	list
(212438) 2006 PP_{13}	14 August 2006	list
(212449) 2006 PQ_{42}	14 August 2006	list
(212474) 2006 QW_{53}	16 August 2006	list
(212695) 2007 PQ_{38}	14 August 2007	list
(214072) 2004 GW_{31}	9 April 2004	list
(214096) 2004 LQ_{11}	12 June 2004	list
(214105) 2004 QK_{9}	20 August 2004	list

(214106) 2004 QN_{18}	20 August 2004	list
(214298) 2005 HG_{10}	30 April 2005	list
(214325) 2005 JT_{61}	8 May 2005	list
(214367) 2005 LC_{3}	3 June 2005	list
(214380) 2005 LZ_{30}	3 June 2005	list
(214382) 2005 LY_{36}	2 June 2005	list
(214441) 2005 QN_{149}	28 August 2005	list
(214545) 2006 OV_{17}	18 July 2006	list
(214546) 2006 OF_{20}	18 July 2006	list
(214550) 2006 PD_{14}	14 August 2006	list
(214554) 2006 PD_{20}	14 August 2006	list
(214564) 2006 QD_{13}	16 August 2006	list
(214565) 2006 QH_{13}	16 August 2006	list
(214572) 2006 QV_{36}	16 August 2006	list
(215773) 2004 GX_{31}	9 April 2004	list
(215804) 2004 QG_{8}	16 August 2004	list
(215939) 2005 LQ_{5}	2 June 2005	list
(215940) 2005 LS_{5}	2 June 2005	list
(215959) 2005 NL_{72}	6 July 2005	list
(215961) 2005 NC_{122}	10 July 2005	list
(215971) 2005 QN_{68}	28 August 2005	list
(215977) 2005 QR_{149}	28 August 2005	list
(216051) 2006 OR_{17}	18 July 2006	list
(216052) 2006 OL_{20}	31 July 2006	list
(216054) 2006 PB_{13}	14 August 2006	list

(216055) 2006 PB_{20}	14 August 2006	list
(216066) 2006 QO_{13}	16 August 2006	list
(216067) 2006 QP_{13}	16 August 2006	list
(216072) 2006 QL_{29}	16 August 2006	list
(216078) 2006 QE_{54}	16 August 2006	list
(216694) 2004 OO_{5}	16 July 2004	list
(216754) 2005 QO_{68}	28 August 2005	list
(217291) 2004 GW_{14}	13 April 2004	list
(217298) 2004 JY_{4}	11 May 2004	list
(217307) 2004 LM_{6}	9 June 2004	list
(217311) 2004 OH_{6}	20 July 2004	list
(217357) 2004 RL_{315}	15 September 2004	list
(217405) 2005 JQ_{61}	8 May 2005	list
(217552) 2007 GA_{25}	12 April 2007	list
(218357) 2004 GH	8 April 2004	list
(218391) 2004 PE_{46}	7 August 2004	list
(218405) 2004 RE_{11}	6 September 2004	list
(218578) 2005 JT_{86}	8 May 2005	list
(218586) 2005 KM_{10}	29 May 2005	list
(218603) 2005 NN_{72}	6 July 2005	list
(218612) 2005 PY_{3}	1 August 2005	list
(220628) 2004 PK_{104}	12 August 2004	list
(220635) 2004 QQ_{25}	26 August 2004	list
(220711) 2004 SJ_{12}	16 September 2004	list
(220992) 2005 NZ_{48}	4 July 2005	list

(220993) 2005 ND_{49}	6 July 2005	list
(221015) 2005 PJ_{1}	1 August 2005	list
(221016) 2005 PW_{1}	1 August 2005	list
(221020) 2005 PS_{20}	15 August 2005	list
(221033) 2005 QU_{52}	27 August 2005	list
(221038) 2005 QZ_{67}	28 August 2005	list
(221039) 2005 QP_{68}	28 August 2005	list
(221061) 2005 QW_{154}	28 August 2005	list
(221063) 2005 QY_{161}	28 August 2005	list
(221119) 2005 SY_{218}	30 September 2005	list
(221123) 2005 SM_{222}	29 September 2005	list
(221513) 2006 GY_{49}	7 April 2006	list
(221764) 2007 FE_{43}	27 March 2007	list
(221768) 2007 GD_{34}	13 April 2007	list
(223590) 2004 GK_{3}	9 April 2004	list
(223640) 2004 LJ_{6}	9 June 2004	list
(223657) 2004 PL_{20}	3 August 2004	list
(223687) 2004 QN_{11}	21 August 2004	list
(223691) 2004 QK_{27}	22 August 2004	list
(223697) 2004 RO_{28}	6 September 2004	list
(223774) 2004 SB_{11}	16 September 2004	list
(223775) 2004 SV_{11}	16 September 2004	list
(223921) 2004 WJ	17 November 2004	list
(223922) 2004 WA_{3}	17 November 2004	list
(224022) 2005 KZ_{12}	20 May 2005	list

(224057) 2005 ML_{53}	16 June 2005	list
(224097) 2005 OS_{13}	29 July 2005	list
(224157) 2005 QC_{68}	28 August 2005	list
(224253) 2005 SK_{194}	29 September 2005	list
(224775) 2006 FY_{51}	27 March 2006	list
(224926) 2007 DA_{41}	22 February 2007	list
(225042) 2007 GQ_{9}	8 April 2007	list
(225049) 2007 GV_{24}	11 April 2007	list
(226681) 2004 HJ_{43}	20 April 2004	list
(226683) 2004 HC_{51}	23 April 2004	list
(226696) 2004 JS_{35}	15 May 2004	list
(226698) 2004 LS_{11}	12 June 2004	list
(226711) 2004 OM_{15}	27 July 2004	list
(226724) 2004 PB_{62}	9 August 2004	list
(226733) 2004 PC_{102}	11 August 2004	list
(226735) 2004 QP_{9}	21 August 2004	list
(226736) 2004 QX_{10}	21 August 2004	list
(226742) 2004 RS_{14}	6 September 2004	list
(226749) 2004 RY_{27}	6 September 2004	list
(226750) 2004 RD_{28}	6 September 2004	list
(226751) 2004 RE_{28}	6 September 2004	list
(226827) 2004 RM_{315}	15 September 2004	list
(227136) 2005 OL_{14}	31 July 2005	list
(227142) 2005 PL_{1}	1 August 2005	list
(227143) 2005 PT_{1}	1 August 2005	list

(227158) 2005 QW_{11}	22 August 2005	list
(227182) 2005 QW_{52}	27 August 2005	list
(227190) 2005 QA_{68}	28 August 2005	list
(227191) 2005 QZ_{68}	28 August 2005	list
(227208) 2005 QD_{148}	28 August 2005	list
(227760) 2006 MZ_{13}	28 June 2006	list
(227762) 2006 QH_{163}	31 August 2006	list
(227940) 2007 GV_{29}	13 April 2007	list
(228070) 2008 OL_{20}	26 July 2008	list
(228126) 2009 ON_{1}	19 July 2009	list
(229061) 2004 GJ_{12}	9 April 2004	list
(229094) 2004 QT_{4}	19 August 2004	list
(229098) 2004 QO_{18}	20 August 2004	list
(229101) 2004 RU_{28}	6 September 2004	list
(229143) 2004 RO_{315}	15 September 2004	list
(229221) 2004 WW_{2}	17 November 2004	list
(229350) 2005 QV_{52}	27 August 2005	list
(229354) 2005 QX_{67}	28 August 2005	list
(229646) 2006 FD_{50}	18 March 2006	list
(229749) 2007 JH_{21}	11 May 2007	list
(229778) 2008 NX_{4}	10 July 2008	list
(229784) 2008 PM_{18}	13 August 2008	list
(230809) 2004 GF_{79}	9 April 2004	list
(230821) 2004 LT_{11}	12 June 2004	list
(230842) 2004 QD_{10}	21 August 2004	list

(230888) 2004 SD_{10}	16 September 2004	list
(231034) 2005 EG_{253}	10 March 2005	list
(231067) 2005 PD_{1}	1 August 2005	list
(231351) 2006 FM_{37}	24 March 2006	list
(231404) 2006 WA_{151}	20 November 2006	list
(231484) 2008 OZ_{18}	25 July 2008	list
(231498) 2008 QK_{38}	23 August 2008	list
(231501) 2008 QV_{43}	23 August 2008	list
(231512) 2008 RD_{109}	1 September 2008	list
(231641) 2009 UO_{138}	18 October 2009	list
(232759) 2004 PM_{3}	3 August 2004	list
(232785) 2004 QB_{10}	21 August 2004	list
(232796) 2004 RB_{112}	5 September 2004	list
(233002) 2005 EJ_{185}	9 March 2005	list
(233003) 2005 EG_{189}	10 March 2005	list
(233031) 2005 EJ_{290}	9 March 2005	list
(233068) 2005 JT_{3}	1 May 2005	list
(233399) 2006 FN_{34}	24 March 2006	list
(233417) 2006 GE_{50}	8 April 2006	list
(233418) 2006 GO_{50}	9 April 2006	list
(233450) 2006 HH_{111}	26 April 2006	list
(233473) 2006 LJ_{7}	15 June 2006	list
(233478) 2006 SD_{7}	18 September 2006	list
(233651) 2008 PV_{18}	6 August 2008	list
(233652) 2008 PC_{21}	3 August 2008	list

(233662) 2008 QB_{44}	23 August 2008	list
(233713) 2008 SG_{107}	21 September 2008	list
(233949) 2009 WC_{216}	27 November 2009	list
(235563) 2004 GE_{12}	13 April 2004	list
(235565) 2004 GU_{39}	15 April 2004	list
(235586) 2004 PG_{3}	3 August 2004	list
(235590) 2004 PS_{16}	7 August 2004	list
(235616) 2004 PV_{105}	15 August 2004	list
(235617) 2004 PB_{106}	15 August 2004	list
(235619) 2004 QF_{27}	19 August 2004	list
(235756) 2004 VC	1 November 2004	list
(235966) 2005 EB_{220}	10 March 2005	list
(236024) 2005 GQ_{128}	3 April 2005	list
(236083) 2005 JA_{185}	1 May 2005	list
(236099) 2005 OV_{28}	27 July 2005	list
(236110) 2005 QO_{190}	28 August 2005	list
(236482) 2006 FO_{34}	24 March 2006	list
(236554) 2006 HX_{58}	21 April 2006	list
(236555) 2006 HK_{59}	21 April 2006	list
(236583) 2006 HX_{105}	29 April 2006	list
(236585) 2006 HR_{111}	29 April 2006	list
(236592) 2006 HB_{128}	29 April 2006	list
(236623) 2006 KF_{2}	17 May 2006	list
(236639) 2006 KJ_{39}	18 May 2006	list
(236657) 2006 KU_{114}	28 May 2006	list

(236670) 2006 PA_{23}	7 August 2006	list
(236671) 2006 PQ_{32}	15 August 2006	list
(236676) 2006 QN_{29}	16 August 2006	list
(236692) 2006 SS_{291}	19 September 2006	list
(236710) 2007 EC_{213}	14 March 2007	list
(236744) 2007 JZ_{41}	14 May 2007	list
(236759) 2007 NE_{4}	10 July 2007	list
(236760) 2007 NF_{4}	10 July 2007	list
(236762) 2007 NT_{5}	15 July 2007	list
(236876) 2007 RD_{280}	11 September 2007	list
(236901) 2007 TX_{31}	5 October 2007	list
(236977) 2008 ND_{5}	10 July 2008	list
(238426) 2004 GX_{15}	9 April 2004	list
(238452) 2004 PZ_{105}	15 August 2004	list
(238454) 2004 QW_{9}	21 August 2004	list
(238458) 2004 RD_{14}	6 September 2004	list
(238459) 2004 RC_{28}	6 September 2004	list
(238713) 2005 GQ_{37}	2 April 2005	list
(238791) 2005 KZ_{11}	30 May 2005	list
(238811) 2005 NO_{20}	6 July 2005	list
(238818) 2005 PO_{23}	6 August 2005	list
(238820) 2005 QX_{4}	24 August 2005	list
(239081) 2006 GM_{49}	6 April 2006	list
(239103) 2006 HB_{56}	22 April 2006	list
(239121) 2006 HM_{111}	26 April 2006	list

(239147) 2006 JT_{48}	8 May 2006	list
(239175) 2006 KZ_{62}	22 May 2006	list
(239186) 2006 KA_{100}	29 May 2006	list
(239196) 2006 LW_{2}	7 June 2006	list
(239205) 2006 OT_{17}	18 July 2006	list
(239206) 2006 ON_{18}	20 July 2006	list
(239208) 2006 PN_{27}	13 August 2006	list
(239209) 2006 PR_{28}	14 August 2006	list
(239270) 2007 JC_{35}	11 May 2007	list
(239277) 2007 NV_{6}	15 July 2007	list
(239294) 2007 PM_{22}	10 August 2007	list
(239305) 2007 PQ_{48}	8 August 2007	list
(239371) 2007 RG_{279}	6 September 2007	list
(240548) 2004 QQ_{24}	22 August 2004	list
(240565) 2004 SD_{5}	18 September 2004	list
(240730) 2005 JK	1 May 2005	list
(240766) 2005 NK_{87}	3 July 2005	list
(240768) 2005 OJ_{1}	17 July 2005	list
(240769) 2005 OW_{26}	27 July 2005	list
(240772) 2005 QT_{146}	28 August 2005	list
(240936) 2006 FU_{50}	26 March 2006	list
(240963) 2006 HC_{85}	26 April 2006	list
(240979) 2006 JX_{45}	8 May 2006	list
(240981) 2006 JJ_{56}	4 May 2006	list
(241000) 2006 KO_{72}	22 May 2006	list

(241006) 2006 LV_{7}	14 June 2006	list
(241013) 2006 PW_{13}	14 August 2006	list
(241016) 2006 PY_{43}	14 August 2006	list
(241018) 2006 QJ_{13}	16 August 2006	list
(241102) 2007 HO	17 April 2007	list
(241111) 2007 NM_{7}	15 July 2007	list
(241133) 2007 PF_{48}	13 August 2007	list
(241506) 2009 CU_{53}	3 February 2009	list
(242435) 2004 ND_{30}	15 July 2004	list
(242450) 2004 QY2	20 August 2004	list
(242576) 2005 GF_{28}	3 April 2005	list
(242668) 2005 SB_{74}	23 September 2005	list
(242720) 2005 UT_{132}	24 October 2005	list
(242879) 2006 HP_{111}	29 April 2006	list
(242905) 2006 KS_{122}	30 May 2006	list
(242909) 2006 LR_{4}	3 June 2006	list
(242921) 2006 OR_{19}	20 July 2006	list
(242927) 2006 QK_{28}	20 August 2006	list
(243067) 2007 GE_{34}	13 April 2007	list
(243083) 2007 NU_{6}	15 July 2007	list
(243084) 2007 NL_{7}	11 July 2007	list
(243085) 2007 OM_{4}	22 July 2007	list
(243088) 2007 PL_{45}	11 August 2007	list
(243130) 2007 RQ_{279}	6 September 2007	list
(243446) 2009 FX_{56}	25 March 2009	list

(243530) 2010 DR_{78}	17 February 2010	list
(245062) 2004 GF_{3}	9 April 2004	list
(245066) 2004 GG_{12}	9 April 2004	list
(245068) 2004 GY_{39}	15 April 2004	list
(245079) 2004 JD_{42}	15 May 2004	list
(245115) 2004 QO_{12}	21 August 2004	list
(245116) 2004 QY_{12}	21 August 2004	list
(245215) 2004 WW_{9}	16 November 2004	list
(245362) 2005 EC_{331}	9 March 2005	list
(245365) 2005 FD_{14}	19 March 2005	list
(245481) 2005 NC_{123}	5 July 2005	list
(245538) 2005 TE_{46}	2 October 2005	list
(245781) 2006 GX_{42}	9 April 2006	list
(245804) 2006 HH_{90}	29 April 2006	list
(245808) 2006 HY_{111}	29 April 2006	list
(245862) 2006 OM_{17}	26 July 2006	list
(245867) 2006 PF_{20}	14 August 2006	list
(245870) 2006 PQ_{28}	14 August 2006	list
(245871) 2006 PW_{31}	14 August 2006	list
(245873) 2006 PW_{32}	15 August 2006	list
(245876) 2006 PG_{43}	14 August 2006	list
(245887) 2006 QY_{53}	16 August 2006	list
(246135) 2007 NB_{6}	10 July 2007	list
(246136) 2007 NM_{6}	10 July 2007	list
(246142) 2007 PC_{3}	4 August 2007	list

(246161) 2007 PQ_{45}	13 August 2007	list
(246412) 2007 UV_{125}	29 October 2007	list
(246535) 2008 MN_{5}	30 June 2008	list
(246811) 2009 GJ_{3}	15 April 2009	list
(248031) 2004 GH_{2}	9 April 2004	list
(248036) 2004 GY_{24}	13 April 2004	list
(248079) 2004 PE_{100}	11 August 2004	list
(248081) 2004 QA_{8}	16 August 2004	list
(248254) 2005 GV_{37}	2 April 2005	list
(248271) 2005 HY_{6}	30 April 2005	list
(248298) 2005 LX_{19}	9 June 2005	list
(248322) 2005 PY_{28}	6 August 2005	list
(248336) 2005 QO_{69}	28 August 2005	list
(248358) 2005 QV_{147}	28 August 2005	list
(248359) 2005 QQ_{150}	28 August 2005	list
(248362) 2005 QQ_{161}	28 August 2005	list
(248590) 2006 CS	1 February 2006	list
(248635) 2006 FJ_{52}	27 March 2006	list
(248682) 2006 KN_{39}	20 May 2006	list
(248699) 2006 KE_{121}	23 May 2006	list
(248702) 2006 MF_{14}	17 June 2006	list
(248703) 2006 MK_{14}	18 June 2006	list
(248712) 2006 OS_{21}	28 July 2006	list
(248716) 2006 PC_{33}	13 August 2006	list
(249406) 2009 CT_{53}	2 February 2009	list

(250501) 2004 GH_{1}	9 April 2004	list
(250508) 2004 HR_{18}	17 April 2004	list
(250520) 2004 OZ_{8}	18 July 2004	list
(250536) 2004 QJ_{9}	20 August 2004	list
(250565) 2004 RL_{335}	15 September 2004	list
(250615) 2005 GB_{10}	1 April 2005	list
(250654) 2005 LN_{5}	2 June 2005	list
(250673) 2005 ON_{22}	31 July 2005	list
(250680) 2005 QC_{5}	26 August 2005	list
(250703) 2005 QK_{177}	27 August 2005	list
(250977) 2006 HT_{111}	29 April 2006	list
(250982) 2006 JX_{57}	8 May 2006	list
(250999) 2006 OQ_{12}	18 July 2006	list
(251010) 2006 PU_{31}	14 August 2006	list
(251021) 2006 QQ_{36}	16 August 2006	list
(251340) 2007 HJ_{96}	19 April 2007	list
(251342) 2007 PF_{3}	4 August 2007	list
(253999) 2004 EY_{95}	4 March 2004	list
(254037) 2004 GJ_{1}	9 April 2004	list
(254039) 2004 GL_{13}	12 April 2004	list
(254042) 2004 GF_{20}	15 April 2004	list
(254072) 2004 HZ_{50}	23 April 2004	list
(254092) 2004 JV_{27}	15 May 2004	list
(254110) 2004 NV_{2}	1 July 2004	list
(254117) 2004 NL_{33}	13 July 2004	list

(254122) 2004 OE_{15}	21 July 2004	list
(254124) 2004 PO_{3}	3 August 2004	list
(254167) 2004 QO_{8}	16 August 2004	list
(254168) 2004 QM_{10}	21 August 2004	list
(254169) 2004 QW_{10}	21 August 2004	list
(254300) 2004 RN_{289}	3 September 2004	list
(254310) 2004 RW_{315}	15 September 2004	list
(254327) 2004 SW_{10}	16 September 2004	list
(254559) 2005 EH_{286}	5 March 2005	list
(254634) 2005 JE_{75}	8 May 2005	list
(254654) 2005 JS_{175}	2 May 2005	list
(254663) 2005 KU_{11}	30 May 2005	list
(254667) 2005 LC_{6}	3 June 2005	list
(254748) 2005 PP_{1}	1 August 2005	list
(254827) 2005 QP_{150}	28 August 2005	list
(254845) 2005 RX	1 September 2005	list
(255540) 2006 HY_{105}	29 April 2006	list
(255562) 2006 KT_{43}	20 May 2006	list
(255569) 2006 KS_{85}	20 May 2006	list
(255585) 2006 NZ	8 July 2006	list
(255607) 2006 PR_{13}	14 August 2006	list
(255608) 2006 PS_{13}	14 August 2006	list
(255624) 2006 PA_{28}	14 August 2006	list
(255625) 2006 PC_{28}	14 August 2006	list
(255629) 2006 PP_{42}	14 August 2006	list

(255630) 2006 QL_{1}	16 August 2006	list
(255631) 2006 QN_{1}	16 August 2006	list
(255642) 2006 QG_{12}	16 August 2006	list
(255643) 2006 QG_{13}	16 August 2006	list
(255660) 2006 QK_{29}	16 August 2006	list
(255669) 2006 QR_{40}	16 August 2006	list
(255685) 2006 QO_{53}	16 August 2006	list
(255709) 2006 QD_{101}	26 August 2006	list
(255725) 2006 QM_{127}	16 August 2006	list
(256114) 2006 UD_{291}	22 October 2006	list
(256524) 2007 EB_{213}	11 March 2007	list
(256545) 2007 GO_{74}	11 April 2007	list
(257182) 2008 JZ_{34}	7 May 2008	list
(257224) 2009 DZ_{6}	18 February 2009	list
(257266) 2009 FZ_{74}	28 March 2009	list
(257270) 2009 GW_{2}	15 April 2009	list
(257333) 2009 HY_{105}	16 April 2009	list
(257344) 2009 JG_{17}	15 May 2009	list
(257373) 2009 PQ_{20}	1 August 2009	list
(260012) 2004 FN_{139}	24 March 2004	list
(260017) 2004 FQ_{148}	29 March 2004	list
(260027) 2004 GA_{25}	13 April 2004	list
(260035) 2004 GX_{36}	13 April 2004	list
(260065) 2004 HF_{46}	21 April 2004	list
(260066) 2004 HF_{48}	22 April 2004	list

(260067) 2004 HU_{48}	22 April 2004	list
(260068) 2004 HA_{51}	23 April 2004	list
(260083) 2004 JR_{36}	12 May 2004	list
(260085) 2004 KG_{4}	16 May 2004	list
(260099) 2004 NN	8 July 2004	list
(260105) 2004 NR_{31}	15 July 2004	list
(260106) 2004 NY_{31}	15 July 2004	list
(260138) 2004 QV_{9}	21 August 2004	list
(260141) 2004 QT_{24}	27 August 2004	list
(260143) 2004 QQ_{27}	26 August 2004	list
(260150) 2004 RU_{13}	6 September 2004	list
(260153) 2004 RW_{27}	6 September 2004	list
(260259) 2004 SZ_{11}	16 September 2004	list
(260277) 2004 TR_{12}	7 October 2004	list
(260374) 2004 VL_{16}	6 November 2004	list
(260395) 2004 WJ_{3}	17 November 2004	list
(260549) 2005 EK_{185}	9 March 2005	list
(260634) 2005 GJ_{111}	10 April 2005	list
(260649) 2005 GT_{144}	10 April 2005	list
(260673) 2005 JG_{37}	4 May 2005	list
(260718) 2005 JX_{176}	13 May 2005	list
(260809) 2005 OT_{1}	27 July 2005	list
(260815) 2005 OZ_{10}	27 July 2005	list
(260816) 2005 ON_{14}	31 July 2005	list
(260823) 2005 PT_{17}	10 August 2005	list

(260889) 2005 QC_{147}	28 August 2005	list
(260985) 2005 SZ_{73}	23 September 2005	list
(261475) 2005 VX_{116}	15 August 2004	list
(261879) 2006 GO_{53}	10 April 2006	list
(261910) 2006 JP_{58}	8 May 2006	list
(261946) 2006 OF_{19}	20 July 2006	list
(261969) 2006 PP_{33}	14 August 2006	list
(261978) 2006 QR_{11}	16 August 2006	list
(261995) 2006 QQ_{40}	16 August 2006	list
(262623) 2006 WY_{2}	17 November 2006	list
(263078) 2007 RU_{150}	8 September 2007	list
(263745) 2008 JG_{22}	6 May 2008	list
(263878) 2009 DX_{138}	22 February 2009	list
(264004) 2009 OO_{10}	26 July 2009	list
(264009) 2009 OM_{24}	19 July 2009	list
(264088) 2009 SL_{255}	16 September 2009	list
(264208) 2010 OC_{126}	21 August 2004	list
(265343) 2004 QJ_{12}	21 August 2004	list
(265346) 2004 RH_{25}	6 September 2004	list
(265552) 2005 PW	1 August 2005	list
(265558) 2005 PM_{23}	1 August 2005	list
(265581) 2005 QU_{146}	28 August 2005	list
(265582) 2005 QY_{146}	28 August 2005	list
(265583) 2005 QS_{147}	28 August 2005	list
(265584) 2005 QZ_{147}	28 August 2005	list

(265632) 2005 SQ_{222}	29 September 2005	list
(266047) 2006 KA_{69}	20 May 2006	list
(266414) 2007 FG_{38}	27 March 2007	list
(266415) 2007 FV_{38}	27 March 2007	list
(266467) 2007 RN_{12}	11 September 2007	list
(266521) 2008 ER_{165}	9 August 2004	list
(266688) 2009 OH_{23}	20 July 2009	list
(266690) 2009 OP_{24}	20 July 2009	list
(267958) 2004 FK_{29}	24 March 2004	list
(267979) 2004 GL_{3}	9 April 2004	list
(267984) 2004 GM_{20}	9 April 2004	list
(268010) 2004 KH_{4}	16 May 2004	list
(268041) 2004 PY_{105}	15 August 2004	list
(268044) 2004 QS_{4}	21 August 2004	list
(268045) 2004 QZ_{9}	21 August 2004	list
(268046) 2004 QJ_{11}	21 August 2004	list
(268050) 2004 QZ_{24}	24 August 2004	list
(268051) 2004 QZ_{28}	21 August 2004	list
(268075) 2004 RU_{85}	6 September 2004	list
(268107) 2004 SL_{11}	16 September 2004	list
(268234) 2005 EA_{220}	10 March 2005	list
(268263) 2005 NE_{123}	6 July 2005	list
(268271) 2005 OF_{22}	29 July 2005	list
(268273) 2005 PA_{1}	1 August 2005	list
(268293) 2005 QW_{79}	27 August 2005	list

(268313) 2005 QX_{146}	28 August 2005	list
(268317) 2005 QO_{161}	28 August 2005	list
(268318) 2005 QX_{161}	28 August 2005	list
(268677) 2006 FO_{37}	24 March 2006	list
(268683) 2006 FF_{52}	26 March 2006	list
(268696) 2006 GS_{50}	1 April 2006	list
(268698) 2006 GA_{52}	7 April 2006	list
(269045) 2007 FF_{38}	27 March 2007	list
(269047) 2007 FH_{43}	27 March 2007	list
(269057) 2007 GW_{24}	11 April 2007	list
(269058) 2007 GO_{29}	11 April 2007	list
(269115) 2007 JT_{39}	11 May 2007	list
(269128) 2007 PU_{48}	13 August 2007	list
(269307) 2008 SK_{139}	23 September 2008	list
(271514) 2004 GV_{15}	9 April 2004	list
(271530) 2004 HS_{18}	17 April 2004	list
(271546) 2004 JN_{17}	12 May 2004	list
(271547) 2004 JU_{17}	12 May 2004	list
(271548) 2004 JV_{17}	12 May 2004	list
(271566) 2004 KQ	16 May 2004	list
(271572) 2004 LE_{1}	9 June 2004	list
(271584) 2004 MP_{8}	29 June 2004	list
(271595) 2004 NT_{32}	15 July 2004	list
(271650) 2004 QF_{8}	16 August 2004	list
(271651) 2004 QU_{12}	21 August 2004	list

(271684) 2004 RW_{85}	6 September 2004	list
(272181) 2005 PU_{4}	7 August 2005	list
(272255) 2005 QR_{147}	28 August 2005	list
(272259) 2005 QD_{162}	28 August 2005	list
(273161) 2006 HL_{59}	22 April 2006	list
(273816) 2007 FA_{39}	28 March 2007	list
(273834) 2007 GO_{25}	13 April 2007	list
(273923) 2007 HJ_{90}	22 April 2007	list
(273964) 2007 KS_{7}	16 May 2007	list
(273966) 2007 KE_{9}	26 May 2007	list
(274042) 2007 RJ_{275}	6 September 2007	list
(274043) 2007 RU_{279}	8 September 2007	list
(274046) 2007 RP_{310}	6 September 2007	list
(274099) 2008 CF_{172}	12 February 2008	list
(274236) 2008 MF_{5}	28 June 2008	list
(274237) 2008 MG_{5}	28 June 2008	list
(274241) 2008 NH_{5}	5 July 2008	list
(274245) 2008 OS_{6}	26 July 2008	list
(274277) 2008 PU_{18}	5 August 2008	list
(274278) 2008 PM_{20}	6 August 2008	list
(274279) 2008 PK_{21}	6 August 2008	list
(274280) 2008 PQ_{21}	6 August 2008	list
(274520) 2008 SN_{178}	23 September 2008	list
(274552) 2008 SC_{257}	21 September 2008	list
(274734) 2008 UZ_{195}	26 October 2008	list

(274737) 2008 UB_{205}	24 October 2008	list
(274775) 2008 UH_{361}	26 October 2008	list
(275321) 2010 UX_{54}	18 July 2006	list
(275385) 2011 AV_{74}	26 March 2006	list
(275386) 2011 AP_{76}	21 July 2004	list
(275414) 2011 CL_{2}	27 July 2004	list
(276775) 2004 HS_{48}	22 April 2004	list
(276788) 2004 KR_{18}	20 May 2004	list
(276802) 2004 PZ_{2}	3 August 2004	list
(276830) 2004 PF_{113}	3 August 2004	list
(276839) 2004 RN_{14}	6 September 2004	list
(276901) 2004 SF_{11}	16 September 2004	list
(276902) 2004 SE_{12}	16 September 2004	list
(276981) 2004 WK	17 November 2004	list
(277126) 2005 GO_{119}	9 April 2005	list
(277175) 2005 OS_{14}	31 July 2005	list
(277181) 2005 PT	1 August 2005	list
(277182) 2005 PF_{1}	1 August 2005	list
(277199) 2005 QN_{56}	28 August 2005	list
(277218) 2005 QF_{147}	28 August 2005	list
(277239) 2005 RT_{10}	8 September 2005	list
(277475) 2005 WK4	27 November 2005	list
(277616) 2006 BN_{6}	21 January 2006	list
(277830) 2006 HR_{29}	24 April 2006	list
(277928) 2006 KV_{113}	22 May 2006	list

(277934) 2006 KU_{129}	20 May 2006	list
(277940) 2006 PK_{28}	14 August 2006	list
(277941) 2006 PF_{33}	13 August 2006	list
(277943) 2006 QG_{1}	16 August 2006	list
(277944) 2006 QM_{1}	16 August 2006	list
(278331) 2007 HY_{68}	23 April 2007	list
(278395) 2007 PP_{38}	14 August 2007	list
(278432) 2007 RS_{275}	9 September 2007	list
(278433) 2007 RT_{275}	9 September 2007	list
(278434) 2007 RU_{275}	9 September 2007	list
(278592) 2008 NG_{5}	3 July 2008	list
(278600) 2008 OZ_{24}	28 July 2008	list
(278694) 2008 RO_{130}	6 September 2008	list
(279120) 2009 ON_{10}	26 July 2009	list
(279347) 2009 YB_{20}	23 August 2008	list
(280481) 2004 HL_{48}	22 April 2004	list
(280492) 2004 NG_{2}	9 July 2004	list
(280502) 2004 PD_{3}	3 August 2004	list
(280503) 2004 PY_{3}	3 August 2004	list
(280528) 2004 QV_{12}	21 August 2004	list
(280530) 2004 QE_{27}	18 August 2004	list
(280533) 2004 RG_{25}	6 September 2004	list
(280677) 2005 EL_{185}	9 March 2005	list
(280722) 2005 GW_{161}	13 April 2005	list
(280724) 2005 GY_{179}	6 April 2005	list

(281047) 2006 HL_{110}	26 April 2006	list
(281250) 2007 MD_{26}	20 June 2007	list
(281252) 2007 NX_{5}	10 July 2007	list
(281255) 2007 PW_{3}	8 August 2007	list
(281268) 2007 QT_{12}	21 August 2007	list
(281377) 2008 OR_{3}	25 July 2008	list
(281383) 2008 OJ_{19}	25 July 2008	list
(281387) 2008 PR_{20}	5 August 2008	list
(281882) 2010 HD_{104}	20 April 2010	list
(281970) 2011 GV_{69}	8 August 2007	list
(282466) 2004 FK_{30}	20 March 2004	list
(282474) 2004 GZ_{28}	9 April 2004	list
(282482) 2004 LP_{16}	12 June 2004	list
(282494) 2004 PZ_{26}	8 August 2004	list
(282506) 2004 PD_{102}	11 August 2004	list
(282510) 2004 QJ_{10}	21 August 2004	list
(282521) 2004 RV_{85}	6 September 2004	list
(282768) 2006 HZ_{105}	29 April 2006	list
(282833) 2006 TK_{95}	3 October 2006	list
(282913) 2007 JE_{43}	13 May 2007	list
(282915) 2007 LF_{19}	11 June 2007	list
(282919) 2007 NW_{6}	15 July 2007	list
(282934) 2007 PX_{44}	12 August 2007	list
(283264) 2011 FT_{151}	7 April 2006	list
(283963) 2004 RO_{27}	6 September 2004	list

(284101) 2005 QV_{68}	28 August 2005	list
(284262) 2006 GY_{51}	7 April 2006	list
(284281) 2006 JW_{45}	8 May 2006	list
(284289) 2006 KM_{39}	20 May 2006	list
(284303) 2006 PY_{12}	14 August 2006	list
(284309) 2006 QJ_{40}	25 August 2006	list
(284378) 2006 SL_{291}	16 September 2006	list
(284408) 2006 UV_{183}	18 October 2006	list
(284469) 2007 GW_{76}	12 April 2007	list
(284493) 2007 ND_{6}	10 July 2007	list
(284509) 2007 QU_{12}	21 August 2007	list
(284548) 2007 RL_{279}	6 September 2007	list
(288477) 2004 FJ_{15}	16 March 2004	list
(288481) 2004 FL_{22}	16 March 2004	list
(288528) 2004 FM_{166}	25 March 2004	list
(288534) 2004 GF_{12}	9 April 2004	list
(288535) 2004 GJ_{13}	12 April 2004	list
(288556) 2004 GC_{87}	14 April 2004	list
(288558) 2004 HV	17 April 2004	list
(288569) 2004 HY_{35}	20 April 2004	list
(288580) 2004 HE_{65}	16 April 2004	list
(288585) 2004 JX_{4}	11 May 2004	list
(288611) 2004 MS_{7}	29 June 2004	list
(288625) 2004 OT_{14}	21 July 2004	list
(288694) 2004 QH_{9}	20 August 2004	list

(288695) 2004 QC_{12}	21 August 2004	list
(288719) 2004 RR_{27}	6 September 2004	list
(288888) 2004 RZ_{255}	6 September 2004	list
(288919) 2004 SS_{10}	16 September 2004	list
(289186) 2004 VG_{78}	12 November 2004	list
(289227) 2004 XY_{60}	14 December 2004	list
(289620) 2005 GK_{38}	3 April 2005	list
(289706) 2005 GF_{227}	11 April 2005	list
(289741) 2005 JF_{37}	4 May 2005	list
(289759) 2005 JG_{75}	8 May 2005	list
(289760) 2005 JH_{75}	8 May 2005	list
(289916) 2005 NB_{20}	5 July 2005	list
(289978) 2005 OH	18 July 2005	list
(289991) 2005 PS_{1}	1 August 2005	list
(289994) 2005 PH_{7}	1 August 2005	list
(290066) 2005 QB_{69}	28 August 2005	list
(290137) 2005 QH_{155}	28 August 2005	list
(290141) 2005 QM_{161}	28 August 2005	list
(291694) 2006 HF_{110}	24 April 2006	list
(291695) 2006 HL_{111}	26 April 2006	list
(291784) 2006 KW_{43}	20 May 2006	list
(291823) 2006 KH_{121}	23 May 2006	list
(291845) 2006 MW_{13}	27 June 2006	list
(291846) 2006 MD_{14}	17 June 2006	list
(291859) 2006 OG_{18}	20 July 2006	list

(291860) 2006 OZ_{20}	30 July 2006	list
(291882) 2006 PZ_{22}	15 August 2006	list
(291894) 2006 PN_{42}	14 August 2006	list
(291895) 2006 QP_{1}	16 August 2006	list
(291908) 2006 QM_{11}	16 August 2006	list
(291909) 2006 QP_{11}	16 August 2006	list
(291910) 2006 QU_{11}	16 August 2006	list
(291911) 2006 QV_{11}	16 August 2006	list
(291932) 2006 QJ_{29}	16 August 2006	list
(291945) 2006 QL_{36}	16 August 2006	list
(291946) 2006 QB_{37}	16 August 2006	list
(292165) 2006 SC_{6}	16 September 2006	list
(292599) 2006 TR_{107}	12 October 2006	list
(293468) 2007 EE_{213}	14 March 2007	list
(293498) 2007 GJ_{2}	9 April 2007	list
(293511) 2007 GQ_{29}	11 April 2007	list
(293512) 2007 GW_{29}	13 April 2007	list
(293649) 2007 PJ_{3}	6 August 2007	list
(293702) 2007 PM_{45}	11 August 2007	list
(295406) 2008 JL_{20}	9 May 2008	list
(295409) 2008 JF_{22}	6 May 2008	list
(295417) 2008 JS_{37}	6 May 2008	list
(295443) 2008 ML	24 June 2008	list
(295693) 2008 TJ_{158}	8 October 2008	list
(296400) 2009 FO_{74}	17 March 2009	list

(296408) 2009 GV_{4}	15 April 2009	list
(296410) 2009 GK_{5}	2 April 2009	list
(296457) 2009 HQ_{76}	26 April 2009	list
(296494) 2009 JC_{2}	2 May 2009	list
(296540) 2009 OE_{23}	20 July 2009	list
(297064) 2010 JX_{34}	4 May 2010	list
(297108) 2010 OM_{96}	6 September 2004	list
(297146) 2010 UF	3 February 2009	list
(297173) 2010 VC_{113}	21 August 2004	list
(297177) 2010 VC_{187}	21 August 2004	list
(297194) 2010 XX_{68}	26 July 2006	list
(298739) 2004 GH_{41}	12 April 2004	list
(298757) 2004 HW_{47}	22 April 2004	list
(298768) 2004 NO_{4}	12 July 2004	list
(298796) 2004 QY_{8}	19 August 2004	list
(298797) 2004 QX_{9}	21 August 2004	list
(298804) 2004 RZ_{13}	6 September 2004	list
(298805) 2004 RZ_{14}	6 September 2004	list
(298873) 2004 SE_{10}	16 September 2004	list
(298978) 2004 WM	17 November 2004	list
(299118) 2005 EG_{162}	9 March 2005	list
(299169) 2005 GR_{37}	2 April 2005	list
(299232) 2005 JJ_{132}	13 May 2005	list
(299252) 2005 MV_{53}	17 June 2005	list
(299275) 2005 NT_{122}	3 July 2005	list

(299285) 2005 OL_{31}	27 July 2005	list
(299292) 2005 PZ_{18}	1 August 2005	list
(299597) 2006 HH_{42}	21 April 2006	list
(299615) 2006 HE_{110}	24 April 2006	list
(299653) 2006 KG_{121}	23 May 2006	list
(299659) 2006 OR_{18}	20 July 2006	list
(299660) 2006 OK_{20}	31 July 2006	list
(299663) 2006 OO_{21}	29 July 2006	list
(300109) 2006 UW_{321}	22 October 2006	list
(300110) 2006 UX_{321}	25 October 2006	list
(300294) 2007 PZ_{7}	10 August 2007	list
(300310) 2007 PL_{26}	11 August 2007	list
(300948) 2008 CV_{184}	10 February 2008	list
(301490) 2009 DE_{142}	25 February 2009	list
(301521) 2009 FK_{22}	18 March 2009	list
(301583) 2010 BR_{2}	19 January 2010	list
(301763) 2010 JB_{44}	4 May 2010	list
(301787) 2010 KE_{62}	18 May 2010	list
(301788) 2010 KF_{127}	22 May 2010	list
(301804) 2011 MT_{5}	19 August 2004	list
(301815) 2011 PF_{4}	28 June 2004	list
(301819) 2011 PE_{6}	10 July 2005	list
(303185) 2004 FQ_{90}	20 March 2004	list
(303198) 2004 GJ_{41}	12 April 2004	list
(303225) 2004 NO_{30}	14 July 2004	list

(303245) 2004 QB_{9}	19 August 2004	list
(303246) 2004 QO_{9}	21 August 2004	list
(303247) 2004 QE_{10}	21 August 2004	list
(303522) 2005 EX_{219}	10 March 2005	list
(303554) 2005 GA_{34}	6 April 2005	list
(303649) 2005 KP_{11}	29 May 2005	list
(303701) 2005 OX_{26}	29 July 2005	list
(303707) 2005 PX	1 August 2005	list
(303708) 2005 PK_{1}	1 August 2005	list
(303738) 2005 QJ_{68}	28 August 2005	list
(303739) 2005 QX_{68}	28 August 2005	list
(303785) 2005 RM_{33}	14 September 2005	list
(304148) 2006 KB_{122}	26 May 2006	list
(304149) 2006 KM_{143}	29 May 2006	list
(304151) 2006 ME_{14}	17 June 2006	list
(304154) 2006 OW_{17}	18 July 2006	list
(304155) 2006 OO_{18}	20 July 2006	list
(304156) 2006 OU_{19}	20 July 2006	list
(304158) 2006 OV_{21}	18 July 2006	list
(304168) 2006 PK_{20}	14 August 2006	list
(304182) 2006 QV_{37}	16 August 2006	list
(304781) 2007 LM_{31}	14 June 2007	list
(304786) 2007 ME_{26}	23 June 2007	list
(304791) 2007 NN_{7}	15 July 2007	list
(304795) 2007 PD_{3}	4 August 2007	list

(305409) 2008 CV_{95}	8 February 2008	list
(305937) 2009 GK_{3}	15 April 2009	list
(305999) 2009 SH_{362}	6 June 2005	list
(306110) 2010 JK_{35}	4 May 2010	list
(306112) 2010 JK_{38}	4 May 2010	list
(306133) 2010 JY_{115}	4 May 2010	list
(306141) 2010 KN_{10}	18 May 2010	list
(306220) 2011 QS_{40}	23 May 2006	list
(306238) 2011 QW_{67}	10 July 2005	list
(306243) 2011 QW_{71}	10 August 2005	list
(306280) 2011 SO_{22}	6 April 2006	list
(306284) 2011 SV_{26}	15 July 2007	list
(307960) 2004 GS_{75}	15 April 2004	list
(307987) 2004 QP_{27}	26 August 2004	list
(308032) 2004 SN_{11}	16 September 2004	list
(308060) 2004 TX_{134}	15 August 2004	list
(308106) 2004 WG	17 November 2004	list
(308242) 2005 GO21	1 April 2005	list
(308266) 2005 GM_{119}	9 April 2005	list
308306 Dainere	19 May 2005	list
(308315) 2005 LZ_{52}	8 June 2005	list
(308316) 2005 LD_{53}	7 June 2005	list
(308336) 2005 OW_{31}	29 July 2005	list
(308339) 2005 PP_{20}	15 August 2005	list
(308742) 2006 JL_{14}	4 May 2006	list

(308775) 2006 PE_{20}	14 August 2006	list
(308779) 2006 PD_{28}	14 August 2006	list
(308780) 2006 PO_{31}	13 August 2006	list
(308781) 2006 PX_{32}	15 August 2006	list
(308822) 2006 QK_{170}	26 August 2006	list
(308915) 2006 SG_{291}	16 September 2006	list
(309188) 2007 DV_{60}	23 February 2007	list
(309217) 2007 NF_{6}	10 July 2007	list
(309226) 2007 PF_{44}	14 August 2007	list
(309317) 2007 RF_{311}	5 September 2007	list
(309734) 2008 RW_{27}	1 September 2008	list
(309946) 2009 FL_{76}	27 March 2009	list
(310001) 2009 JD_{11}	14 May 2009	list
(310028) 2010 BJ_{51}	25 July 2007	list
(310059) 2010 JR_{112}	13 May 2010	list
(310079) 2010 KS_{117}	22 May 2010	list
(310171) 2011 SU_{19}	8 May 2006	list
(310176) 2011 SZ_{35}	18 July 2006	list
(310257) 2011 UM_{30}	15 July 2007	list
(310330) 2011 UJ_{180}	12 May 2004	list
(310336) 2011 UZ_{195}	21 July 2004	list
(311130) 2004 RV_{13}	6 September 2004	list
(311184) 2004 WT	17 November 2004	list
(311310) 2005 KJ_{12}	16 May 2005	list
(311321) 2005 NP_{1}	3 July 2005	list

(311363) 2005 SA_{74}	23 September 2005	list
(311554) 2006 BQ_{147}	31 January 2006	list
(311594) 2006 KN_{23}	16 May 2006	list
(311603) 2006 KD_{121}	21 May 2006	list
(311611) 2006 OD_{20}	18 July 2006	list
(311615) 2006 PP_{31}	14 August 2006	list
(311621) 2006 QZ_{12}	16 August 2006	list
(311967) 2007 EB	1 March 2007	list
(311983) 2007 EK_{201}	10 March 2007	list
(311994) 2007 KN_{9}	20 May 2007	list
(312004) 2007 PW_{27}	14 August 2007	list
(312030) 2007 RK_{133}	15 September 2007	list
(312070) 2007 TA_{19}	9 October 2007	list
(312447) 2008 JN_{22}	6 May 2008	list
(312459) 2008 QG_{44}	25 August 2008	list
(312534) 2009 DH_{142}	27 February 2009	list
(312540) 2009 ER_{21}	15 March 2009	list
(312684) 2010 NX_{22}	6 September 2004	list
(312844) 2011 UM_{55}	18 July 2006	list
(313887) 2004 HH_{48}	22 April 2004	list
(313888) 2004 HK_{48}	22 April 2004	list
(313889) 2004 HD_{62}	26 April 2004	list
(313919) 2004 RB	21 August 2004	list
(314230) 2005 PV_{1}	1 August 2005	list
(314262) 2005 QM_{149}	28 August 2005	list

(314432) 2005 UR_{480}	24 October 2005	list
(314661) 2006 QC_{12}	16 August 2006	list
(314806) 2006 TJ_{95}	2 October 2006	list
(315098) 2007 EX	10 March 2007	list
(315149) 2007 EF_{213}	15 March 2007	list
(315202) 2007 QN_{12}	23 August 2007	list
(315238) 2007 RK_{275}	14 August 2007	list
(316066) 2009 HA_{83}	26 April 2009	list
(316171) 2009 WV_{197}	5 August 2008	list
(316236) 2010 OB_{20}	1 August 2005	list
(316548) 2010 XR_{72}	19 July 2009	list
(316589) 2011 UQ_{162}	16 August 2004	list
(316611) 2011 WA_{30}	26 April 2006	list
(317377) 2002 ND_{79}	6 September 2005	list
(318057) 2004 FF_{83}	17 March 2004	list
(318060) 2004 FT_{90}	20 March 2004	list
(318077) 2004 GK_{12}	9 April 2004	list
(318081) 2004 GG_{20}	15 April 2004	list
(318082) 2004 GP_{20}	9 April 2004	list
(318102) 2004 HM_{43}	20 April 2004	list
(318108) 2004 HC_{75}	30 April 2004	list
(318129) 2004 NS_{33}	15 July 2004	list
(318139) 2004 PB_{41}	9 August 2004	list
(318141) 2004 PD_{46}	7 August 2004	list
(318163) 2004 QD_{13}	21 August 2004	list

(318172) 2004 RA_{15}	6 September 2004	list
(318251) 2004 RQ_{315}	15 September 2004	list
(318261) 2004 SF_{10}	16 September 2004	list
(318262) 2004 SP_{11}	16 September 2004	list
(318523) 2005 ED_{220}	10 March 2005	list
(318551) 2005 GL_{37}	2 April 2005	list
(318580) 2005 GL_{162}	12 April 2005	list
(318632) 2005 KP_{6}	18 May 2005	list
(318662) 2005 NC_{49}	6 July 2005	list
(319404) 2006 GT_{42}	7 April 2006	list
(319438) 2006 KD_{2}	17 May 2006	list
(319473) 2006 PO_{13}	14 August 2006	list
(319480) 2006 QO_{1}	16 August 2006	list
(319482) 2006 QQ_{11}	16 August 2006	list
(319688) 2006 TL_{95}	3 October 2006	list
(320198) 2007 GX_{76}	13 April 2007	list
(320241) 2007 JH_{35}	13 May 2007	list
(320246) 2007 KO_{7}	16 May 2007	list
(320254) 2007 PE_{4}	8 August 2007	list
(320373) 2007 TV_{419}	5 October 2007	list
(321022) 2008 LA_{18}	15 June 2008	list
(321025) 2008 ME_{1}	28 June 2008	list
(321338) 2009 JF_{11}	14 May 2009	list
(321369) 2009 OT_{4}	15 September 2004	list
(321477) 2009 RO_{65}	15 September 2009	list

(321735) 2010 LC_{99}	21 December 2005	list
(321763) 2010 NR_{116}	16 September 2004	list
(321805) 2010 PX_{72}	14 July 2004	list
(322134) 2010 VS_{183}	29 July 2005	list
(322135) 2010 VX_{184}	19 July 2009	list
(322189) 2010 XG_{63}	21 August 2004	list
(323433) 2004 FY_{147}	16 March 2004	list
(323459) 2004 JW_{17}	12 May 2004	list
(323470) 2004 KJ_{18}	20 May 2004	list
(323480) 2004 NS_{10}	9 July 2004	list
(323488) 2004 PU_{45}	7 August 2004	list
(323497) 2004 PK_{115}	11 August 2004	list
(323499) 2004 QA_{4}	16 August 2004	list
(323500) 2004 QL_{8}	16 August 2004	list
(323502) 2004 QV_{10}	21 August 2004	list
(323503) 2004 QA_{12}	21 August 2004	list
(323504) 2004 QC_{13}	21 August 2004	list
(323752) 2005 NB_{123}	5 July 2005	list
(323760) 2005 OP_{22}	31 July 2005	list
(323763) 2005 PD_{4}	6 August 2005	list
(323764) 2005 PB_{7}	1 August 2005	list
(323795) 2005 QH_{149}	27 August 2005	list
(323800) 2005 QK_{155}	28 August 2005	list
(323804) 2005 QU_{161}	28 August 2005	list
(324332) 2006 OR_{12}	18 July 2006	list

(324337) 2006 PV_{13}	14 August 2006	list
(324345) 2006 QZ_{11}	16 August 2006	list
(324352) 2006 QC_{38}	16 August 2006	list
(324745) 2007 EH_{223}	14 March 2007	list
(324763) 2007 GB_{25}	28 March 2007	list
(325102) 2008 EY_{5}	4 March 2008	list
(325359) 2008 MP	24 June 2008	list
(325361) 2008 NB_{5}	3 July 2008	list
(325519) 2009 RF_{63}	13 September 2009	list
(325769) 2010 LY_{63}	12 June 2010	list
(325798) 2010 RF_{70}	16 July 2007	list
(325958) 2010 VJ_{99}	19 March 2006	list
(326039) 2010 XM_{65}	20 July 2009	list
(326050) 2011 AM_{8}	20 October 2009	list
(326074) 2011 AG_{67}	21 July 2004	list
(326957) 2004 GF_{34}	12 April 2004	list
(326982) 2004 OV_{14}	29 July 2004	list
(326996) 2004 QJ_{4}	20 August 2004	list
(327031) 2004 RD_{290}	5 September 2004	list
(327213) 2005 NT_{125}	10 July 2005	list
(327476) 2005 YM_{47}	14 July 2004	list
(327644) 2006 QJ_{12}	16 August 2006	list
(327670) 2006 QH_{187}	16 August 2006	list
(328049) 2007 NA_{6}	10 July 2007	list
(328050) 2007 NS_{6}	10 July 2007	list

(328359) 2008 OZ_{3}	26 July 2008	list
(328389) 2008 RK_{98}	7 September 2008	list
(328393) 2008 RY_{118}	10 September 2008	list
(328524) 2009 QB_{53}	17 August 2009	list
(328622) 2009 SL_{150}	19 May 2004	list
(328855) 2009 WA_{156}	13 May 2007	list
(328871) 2010 AO_{61}	20 October 2009	list
(328876) 2010 BT_{25}	27 July 2004	list
(328888) 2010 PS_{48}	23 October 2006	list
(328899) 2010 TN_{19}	25 July 2007	list
(329116) 2011 CS_{26}	6 August 2008	list
(329164) 2012 BA_{107}	22 June 2004	list
(329779) 2004 MT_{7}	29 June 2004	list
(329785) 2004 NV_{33}	13 July 2004	list
(329790) 2004 PC_{41}	9 August 2004	list
(329835) 2004 SY_{10}	16 September 2004	list
(329912) 2005 LC_{8}	6 June 2005	list
(329915) 2005 MB	16 June 2005	list
(329951) 2005 QW_{57}	24 August 2005	list
(330239) 2006 QN_{12}	16 August 2006	list
(330515) 2007 RQ_{275}	8 September 2007	list
(330517) 2007 RC_{311}	2 September 2007	list
(330706) 2008 MY	27 June 2008	list
(330707) 2008 NC_{5}	3 July 2008	list
(330716) 2008 PS_{20}	5 August 2008	list

(330717) 2008 PZ_{20}	2 August 2008	list
(330723) 2008 QX_{43}	23 August 2008	list
(330760) 2008 SQ_{253}	21 September 2008	list
(330806) 2008 UW_{345}	26 October 2008	list
(331145) 2010 VJ_{201}	9 September 2007	list
(331155) 2010 XL_{32}	16 September 2004	list
(331402) 2012 FY_{39}	10 April 2005	list
(331409) 2012 FQ_{47}	30 June 2004	list
(331896) 2004 NM_{24}	14 July 2004	list
(331995) 2005 GU_{144}	10 April 2005	list
(332033) 2005 PL_{23}	13 August 2005	list
(332047) 2005 QU_{147}	28 August 2005	list
(332382) 2007 FC_{43}	22 March 2007	list
(332433) 2007 TV_{417}	5 October 2007	list
(332528) 2008 NE_{5}	11 July 2008	list
(332539) 2008 PN_{20}	2 August 2008	list
(332540) 2008 PN_{21}	6 August 2008	list
(332684) 2009 FT_{56}	20 February 2009	list
(332687) 2009 OV_{2}	19 July 2009	list
(332689) 2009 PR_{17}	2 August 2009	list
(332878) 2011 AQ_{27}	1 May 2008	list
(332928) 2011 CN_{50}	19 March 2007	list
(333148) 2012 BC_{12}	22 August 2004	list
(333208) 2012 HR_{8}	9 August 2004	list
(333213) 2012 HS_{17}	29 June 2008	list

(333220) 2012 HN_{38}	29 July 2005	list
(333456) 2004 OE_{13}	21 July 2004	list
(333463) 2004 QH_{12}	21 August 2004	list
(333478) 2004 SD_{20}	21 September 2004	list
(333517) 2005 NP_{123}	10 July 2005	list
(333611) 2007 QC_{16}	23 August 2007	list
(333784) 2011 FM_{123}	27 June 2008	list
(333812) 2012 BS_{132}	1 April 2004	list
(335011) 2004 HB_{51}	23 April 2004	list
(335020) 2004 NN_{19}	12 June 2004	list
(335022) 2004 OV_{10}	21 July 2004	list
(335023) 2004 PM_{1}	3 August 2004	list
(335030) 2004 QN_{10}	21 August 2004	list
(335033) 2004 QA_{29}	21 August 2004	list
(335037) 2004 RP_{11}	6 September 2004	list
(335039) 2004 RZ_{27}	6 September 2004	list
(335081) 2004 SW_{9}	16 September 2004	list
(335288) 2005 OO_{22}	31 July 2005	list
(335291) 2005 PG_{1}	1 August 2005	list
(335329) 2005 QM_{155}	28 August 2005	list
(335613) 2006 FM_{9}	26 March 2006	list
(335733) 2007 DR_{60}	30 January 2007	list
(335771) 2007 EF_{161}	14 March 2007	list
(335823) 2007 JU_{42}	9 April 2007	list
(335824) 2007 KN_{7}	16 May 2007	list

(335933) 2007 TV_{31}	5 October 2007	list
(336112) 2008 JL_{35}	9 May 2008	list
(336121) 2008 OS_{3}	25 July 2008	list
(336125) 2008 OL_{19}	26 July 2008	list
(336133) 2008 PT_{18}	5 August 2008	list
(336134) 2008 PW_{20}	2 August 2008	list
(336302) 2008 TZ_{2}	11 April 2007	list
(336556) 2009 KK_{36}	28 May 2009	list
(336732) 2010 EA_{14}	7 August 2004	list
(336735) 2010 EG_{36}	11 March 2010	list
(336757) 2010 QU_{4}	19 March 2004	list
(336761) 2011 AP_{4}	11 November 2007	list
(336870) 2011 FQ_{151}	15 July 2007	list
(336999) 2012 LH	27 March 2009	list
(338990) 2004 GS	9 April 2004	list
(338991) 2004 GC_{3}	9 April 2004	list
(338994) 2004 GH_{12}	9 April 2004	list
(339015) 2004 GF_{78}	9 April 2004	list
(339045) 2004 KK_{4}	16 May 2004	list
(339053) 2004 NM_{2}	9 July 2004	list
(339073) 2004 QP_{18}	20 August 2004	list
(339081) 2004 RF_{28}	6 September 2004	list
(339133) 2004 SO_{2}	16 September 2004	list
(339134) 2004 SW_{11}	16 September 2004	list
(339167) 2004 TE_{69}	29 July 2004	list

(339269) 2004 WG_{3}	17 November 2004	list
(339532) 2005 JU_{3}	1 May 2005	list
(339606) 2005 OT_{3}	10 July 2005	list
(339620) 2005 PL_{4}	7 August 2005	list
(339647) 2005 QX_{52}	27 August 2005	list
(339653) 2005 QE_{69}	28 August 2005	list
(339678) 2005 QR_{146}	28 August 2005	list
(339680) 2005 QC_{155}	28 August 2005	list
(339703) 2005 RU_{10}	8 September 2005	list
(339705) 2005 RB_{22}	6 September 2005	list
(340452) 2006 GS_{42}	7 April 2006	list
(340530) 2006 JR_{48}	8 May 2006	list
(340537) 2006 JX_{54}	8 May 2006	list
(340566) 2006 KB_{100}	29 May 2006	list
(340577) 2006 OY_{5}	18 July 2006	list
(340586) 2006 PL_{20}	14 August 2006	list
(340590) 2006 PT_{32}	15 August 2006	list
(340594) 2006 QH_{1}	16 August 2006	list
(340601) 2006 QQ_{39}	20 August 2006	list
(340740) 2006 SW_{198}	23 September 2006	list
(341035) 2007 GY_{33}	11 April 2007	list
(341150) 2007 PA_{29}	14 August 2007	list
(341160) 2007 PW_{46}	14 August 2007	list
(341771) 2007 VA_{335}	14 August 2006	list
(341942) 2008 OV_{24}	28 July 2008	list

(341943) 2008 OG_{25}	26 July 2008	list
(341950) 2008 PT_{4}	4 August 2008	list
(341955) 2008 PH_{20}	5 August 2008	list
(341956) 2008 PQ_{20}	3 August 2008	list
(341957) 2008 PV_{20}	6 August 2008	list
(342016) 2008 RN_{78}	10 September 2008	list
(342046) 2008 RQ_{125}	22 August 2004	list
(342149) 2008 SN_{139}	23 September 2008	list
(342320) 2008 TD_{80}	22 August 2004	list
(342611) 2008 UE_{327}	25 October 2008	list
(342842) 2008 YB_{3}	18 December 2008	list
(343118) 2009 DX_{136}	25 February 2009	list
(343129) 2009 ER_{26}	4 March 2009	list
(343131) 2009 EM_{30}	6 March 2009	list
(343424) 2010 DV_{17}	27 March 2007	list
(343427) 2010 DD_{24}	12 May 2004	list
(343512) 2010 EC_{113}	16 August 2006	list
(343640) 2010 JM_{38}	4 May 2010	list
(343651) 2010 JH_{115}	8 May 2010	list
(343713) 2011 ED_{36}	14 June 2008	list
(343786) 2011 GL_{37}	28 July 2008	list
(343844) 2011 HA_{38}	10 July 2007	list
(343850) 2011 HP_{43}	18 July 2006	list
(343880) 2011 HR_{80}	8 July 2004	list
(343905) 2011 JR_{17}	18 July 2006	list

(343943) 2011 KQ_{23}	11 April 2007	list
(343988) 2011 OJ_{18}	18 March 2010	list
(344016) 2012 BO_{130}	21 August 2004	list
(344890) 2004 RP_{14}	6 September 2004	list
(345037) 2005 ED_{189}	10 March 2005	list
(345504) 2006 JU_{48}	8 May 2006	list
(345740) 2007 DN_{72}	21 August 2004	list
(345851) 2007 PY_{3}	8 August 2007	list
(345953) 2007 SL_{4}	19 September 2007	list
(346037) 2007 TS_{419}	3 October 2007	list
(346414) 2008 SP_{178}	23 September 2008	list
(346479) 2008 UG	17 October 2008	list
(346846) 2009 DB_{110}	30 January 2009	list
(346957) 2010 BJ_{4}	23 January 2010	list
(347023) 2010 EZ_{38}	29 April 2006	list
(347101) 2010 HZ_{53}	12 April 2004	list
(347106) 2010 HG_{104}	16 April 2010	list
(347149) 2011 CB_{76}	3 July 2005	list
(347150) 2011 CH_{76}	6 September 2004	list
(347156) 2011 EZ_{42}	7 August 2004	list
(347164) 2011 FZ_{17}	12 April 2007	list
(347185) 2011 GA_{45}	16 May 2004	list
(347236) 2011 JJ_{11}	21 August 2004	list
(347368) 2012 RD_{6}	16 August 2006	list
(347463) 2012 TR_{309}	19 August 2008	list

(348175) 2004 NU_{10}	9 July 2004	list
(348179) 2004 OB_{13}	29 July 2004	list
(348194) 2004 QG_{10}	21 August 2004	list
(348389) 2005 GW_{99}	7 April 2005	list
(348762) 2006 HS_{111}	29 April 2006	list
(348786) 2006 OG_{20}	18 July 2006	list
(348801) 2006 QZ_{43}	31 July 2006	list
(349113) 2007 GL_{25}	13 April 2007	list
(349118) 2007 GK_{74}	14 March 2007	list
(349133) 2007 JB	25 January 2007	list
(349141) 2007 KX_{6}	26 May 2007	list
(349150) 2007 NY_{5}	10 July 2007	list
(349151) 2007 NH_{6}	10 July 2007	list
(349163) 2007 PA_{40}	15 August 2007	list
(349208) 2007 RY_{278}	5 September 2007	list
(349230) 2007 TU_{31}	5 October 2007	list
(349470) 2008 CT_{181}	9 February 2008	list
(349495) 2008 JH_{35}	3 May 2008	list
(349924) 2009 UW_{91}	9 March 2008	list
(350026) 2010 JG_{116}	9 May 2010	list
(350068) 2011 HQ_{2}	23 August 2008	list
(350088) 2011 KJ_{24}	10 July 2007	list
(350089) 2011 KZ_{26}	13 August 2008	list
(350169) 2011 UL	18 July 2006	list
(350182) 2011 UL_{188}	30 May 2005	list

(350257) 2012 TG_{149}	15 May 2004	list
(350276) 2012 TO_{230}	19 July 2004	list
(351206) 2004 GP_{59}	12 April 2004	list
(351237) 2004 QL_{12}	21 August 2004	list
(351453) 2005 KY_{10}	30 May 2005	list
(351494) 2005 QT_{147}	28 August 2005	list
(351801) 2006 KW_{23}	6 April 2006	list
(351808) 2006 KU_{86}	27 May 2006	list
(351812) 2006 LZ_{7}	7 June 2006	list
(351815) 2006 OF_{15}	30 July 2006	list
(351825) 2006 PS_{32}	15 August 2006	list
(352146) 2007 MH_{27}	23 June 2007	list
(352156) 2007 PE_{48}	11 August 2007	list
(352219) 2007 TZ_{31}	5 October 2007	list
(352293) 2007 TR_{419}	2 October 2007	list
(352763) 2008 UJ_{7}	6 September 2008	list
(352989) 2009 BG_{103}	30 January 2009	list
(353092) 2009 DP_{139}	25 February 2009	list
(353138) 2009 GX_{4}	15 April 2009	list
(353223) 2010 AT_{4}	3 September 2004	list
(353374) 2011 KA_{20}	30 July 2006	list
(353543) 2011 SA_{176}	15 August 2005	list
(353599) 2011 TN_{17}	10 July 2005	list
(353699) 2011 UN_{379}	28 August 2005	list
(353763) 2012 DK_{55}	24 March 2004	list

(353862) 2012 VV_{97}	15 August 2006	list
(353869) 2012 WE_{8}	7 June 2006	list
(354328) 2002 WR_{31}	6 May 2009	list
(354506) 2004 PT_{45}	7 August 2004	list
(354512) 2004 QR_{8}	16 August 2004	list
(354541) 2004 RP_{251}	14 September 2004	list
(354663) 2005 LY_{19}	9 June 2005	list
(354671) 2005 NB_{17}	3 June 2005	list
(354683) 2005 PM_{4}	7 August 2005	list
(354994) 2006 OW_{21}	29 July 2006	list
(354997) 2006 PG_{28}	14 August 2006	list
(354998) 2006 PL_{31}	13 August 2006	list
(354999) 2006 PM_{42}	14 August 2006	list
(355000) 2006 QX_{11}	16 August 2006	list
(355046) 2006 SO_{19}	18 September 2006	list
(355263) 2007 PZ_{6}	4 August 2007	list
(355368) 2007 TU_{287}	21 August 2007	list
(355751) 2008 JO_{22}	6 May 2008	list
(355752) 2008 JM_{35}	4 May 2008	list
(356101) 2009 ER_{27}	5 March 2009	list
(356188) 2009 JF_{17}	6 May 2009	list
(356260) 2009 US_{153}	21 October 2009	list
(356297) 2010 FY_{20}	6 September 2004	list
(356318) 2010 HT_{104}	20 April 2010	list
(356337) 2010 KA_{62}	22 May 2010	list

(356380) 2010 OP_{19}	17 June 2004	list
(356384) 2010 OX_{40}	21 August 2004	list
(356496) 2011 SW_{23}	18 July 2006	list
(356575) 2011 SL_{245}	7 August 2005	list
(356650) 2011 UH_{61}	15 July 2004	list
(356850) 2011 WM_{14}	8 June 2005	list
(357277) 2002 RA_{286}	13 August 2006	list
(357479) 2004 GJ_{3}	9 April 2004	list
(357511) 2004 RQ_{14}	6 September 2004	list
(357517) 2004 RX_{85}	6 September 2004	list
(357554) 2004 SR_{58}	18 September 2004	list
(357657) 2005 JD_{68}	4 May 2005	list
(357704) 2005 PF_{29}	8 August 2005	list
(358109) 2006 KZ_{123}	30 May 2006	list
(358113) 2006 OP_{20}	18 July 2006	list
(358116) 2006 PZ_{12}	14 August 2006	list
(358129) 2006 QJ_{54}	16 August 2006	list
(358471) 2007 NS_{4}	15 July 2007	list
(358472) 2007 OT_{10}	20 July 2007	list
(359229) 2009 DY_{138}	22 February 2009	list
(359262) 2009 FO_{56}	22 March 2009	list
(359312) 2009 JE_{2}	2 May 2009	list
(359488) 2010 OL_{53}	8 August 2005	list
(359495) 2010 OY_{107}	18 August 2004	list
(359605) 2010 WG_{13}	9 June 2007	list

(359615) 2011 JR_{3}	30 September 2006	list
(359701) 2011 SS_{228}	8 July 2004	list
(359712) 2011 TJ_{8}	8 September 2008	list
(359886) 2011 WW_{43}	10 April 2005	list
(359897) 2011 WJ_{60}	17 November 2004	list
(359947) 2012 AN_{19}	29 July 2006	list
(360046) 2013 AG_{59}	29 March 2009	list
(360112) 2013 CG_{16}	1 August 2005	list
(360148) 2013 CZ_{54}	10 March 2006	list
(360336) 2001 TE_{262}	21 August 2004	list
(360390) 2002 CW_{317}	26 July 2008	list
(360458) 2002 QQ_{152}	19 July 2010	list
(360643) 2004 HY_{53}	16 April 2004	list
(360657) 2004 RL_{28}	6 September 2004	list
(360832) 2005 LX_{52}	3 June 2005	list
(361175) 2006 OV_{19}	20 July 2006	list
(361304) 2006 TV_{108}	12 October 2006	list
(361545) 2007 PS_{27}	8 August 2007	list
(361988) 2008 NA_{4}	11 July 2008	list
(362256) 2009 MT_{1}	2 May 2009	list
(362701) 2011 UH_{161}	19 September 2006	list
(362718) 2011 UJ_{242}	29 April 2009	list
(362799) 2011 WX_{153}	19 September 2006	list
(362932) 2012 FO_{2}	6 September 2004	list
(362935) 2012 JB_{5}	26 September 2006	list

(362936) 2012 UL_{84}	22 July 2007	list
(362941) 2012 XO_{101}	16 March 2004	list
(363829) 2005 PQ_{6}	10 August 2005	list
(363833) 2005 PA_{24}	8 August 2005	list
(363846) 2005 QT_{68}	28 August 2005	list
(364136) 2006 CJ	1 February 2006	list
(364189) 2006 PP_{27}	13 August 2006	list
(364195) 2006 QD_{12}	16 August 2006	list
(364527) 2007 EJ_{201}	9 March 2007	list
(364539) 2007 FG_{43}	27 March 2007	list
(364846) 2008 CW_{184}	14 February 2008	list
(364877) 2008 EM_{9}	9 March 2008	list
(365016) 2008 OK_{20}	26 July 2008	list
(365230) 2009 HU_{103}	19 April 2009	list
(365234) 2009 HO_{106}	26 April 2009	list
(365343) 2009 SA_{255}	16 September 2009	list
(365344) 2009 SM_{255}	16 September 2009	list
(365478) 2010 PU_{32}	23 March 2007	list
(365877) 2011 UE_{315}	27 March 2009	list
(365905) 2011 WP_{65}	20 February 2007	list
(365937) 2012 AB_{1}	4 May 2006	list
(366839) 2005 PF	1 August 2005	list
(367067) 2006 OJ_{20}	31 July 2006	list
(367077) 2006 PY_{28}	15 August 2006	list
(367297) 2007 VB_{175}	20 May 2006	list

(367395) 2008 OD_{25}	26 July 2008	list
(367511) 2009 NZ	1 August 2005	list
(367549) 2009 RU_{69}	8 September 2009	list
(367741) 2010 VW_{28}	16 August 2006	list
(367772) 2010 XC_{3}	18 July 2006	list
(367821) 2011 AR_{79}	21 August 2004	list
(367886) 2011 WN_{24}	4 May 2010	list
(367889) 2011 YY_{5}	3 March 2008	list
(367901) 2012 BS_{19}	8 May 2008	list
(367929) 2012 CD_{14}	16 May 2004	list
(368118) 2013 GQ_{110}	23 April 2004	list
(368125) 2013 HM_{21}	16 August 2006	list
(368575) 2004 PC_{3}	3 August 2004	list
(368584) 2004 QZ_{7}	16 August 2004	list
(368677) 2005 QB_{68}	28 August 2005	list
(368864) 2006 PT_{31}	14 August 2006	list
(368965) 2007 BB_{73}	27 January 2007	list
(369052) 2008 CU_{184}	8 February 2008	list
(369113) 2008 OC_{4}	26 July 2008	list
(369398) 2009 VS_{112}	15 November 2009	list
(369494) 2010 UQ_{74}	29 April 2006	list
(369537) 2010 XO_{88}	1 February 2006	list
(369550) 2011 AZ_{47}	16 August 2006	list
(369564) 2011 BN_{14}	7 April 2006	list
(369566) 2011 BH_{19}	13 August 2006	list

(369578) 2011 BY_{89}	3 August 2004	list
(369589) 2011 BH_{134}	21 August 2004	list
(369611) 2011 CW_{68}	6 September 2004	list
(369638) 2011 EM_{24}	6 August 2008	list
(369722) 2012 DY_{78}	18 March 2004	list
(369749) 2012 FT_{41}	10 July 2005	list
(369756) 2012 FG_{72}	9 May 2008	list
(369758) 2012 FT_{74}	16 April 2004	list
(369759) 2012 FW_{74}	10 June 2007	list
(369776) 2012 GH_{23}	6 May 2008	list
(369829) 2012 HL_{84}	18 September 2009	list
(369908) 2013 AS_{121}	3 August 2004	list
(370713) 2004 QW_{12}	21 August 2004	list
(370717) 2004 RQ_{11}	6 September 2004	list
(370780) 2004 SQ_{24}	18 September 2004	list
(370929) 2005 PG_{7}	1 August 2005	list
(370939) 2005 RG_{5}	5 September 2005	list
(371314) 2006 GZ_{51}	7 April 2006	list
(371340) 2006 KL_{19}	21 May 2006	list
(371366) 2006 PH_{27}	31 July 2006	list
(371797) 2007 QQ_{12}	21 August 2007	list
(371805) 2007 RW_{149}	12 September 2007	list
(372021) 2008 OQ_{13}	26 July 2008	list
(372023) 2008 PU_{20}	6 August 2008	list
(372721) 2009 XD_{21}	3 September 2004	list

(372774) 2010 DO_{20}	18 February 2010	list
(372831) 2010 UR_{64}	29 May 2009	list
(372853) 2010 VK_{150}	16 August 2006	list
(372855) 2010 VX_{160}	28 May 2009	list
(372922) 2011 BM_{17}	21 August 2004	list
(372975) 2011 CT_{33}	22 August 2004	list
(373146) 2012 BJ_{26}	3 October 2005	list
(373162) 2012 CH_{57}	28 March 2009	list
(373170) 2012 DW_{19}	8 July 2004	list
(373266) 2012 HB_{11}	29 June 2004	list
(374038) 2004 HW	18 April 2004	list
(374043) 2004 LH_{6}	9 June 2004	list
(374046) 2004 OV_{8}	27 June 2004	list
(374047) 2004 OF_{11}	27 June 2004	list
(374048) 2004 PJ_{3}	3 August 2004	list
(374061) 2004 RY_{5}	21 August 2004	list
(374104) 2004 RR_{315}	15 September 2004	list
(374116) 2004 TG_{6}	21 August 2004	list
(374125) 2004 TM_{69}	19 August 2004	list
(374227) 2005 GM_{8}	1 April 2005	list
(374482) 2005 YM_{55}	27 December 2005	list
(375015) 2007 GA_{34}	13 April 2007	list
(375099) 2007 TM_{1}	2 October 2007	list
(375103) 2007 TD_{71}	13 October 2007	list
(375294) 2008 OU_{3}	25 July 2008	list

(375302) 2008 PJ_{21}	6 August 2008	list
(375540) 2008 US_{206}	22 October 2008	list
(375698) 2009 OE_{25}	20 July 2009	list
(375915) 2009 WL_{26}	13 April 2007	list
(376332) 2011 GO_{75}	21 August 2007	list
(376376) 2012 DR_{8}	6 September 2008	list
(376390) 2012 DG_{90}	8 March 2005	list
(376400) 2012 FM_{31}	4 July 2005	list
(376498) 2012 KP_{38}	30 July 2008	list
(376514) 2012 LA_{5}	4 August 2008	list
(377303) 2004 FN_{102}	20 March 2004	list
(377307) 2004 GW_{15}	9 April 2004	list
(377308) 2004 GB_{16}	9 April 2004	list
(377310) 2004 GW_{39}	15 April 2004	list
(377320) 2004 JD_{17}	12 May 2004	list
(377326) 2004 NL_{2}	9 July 2004	list
(377341) 2004 PG_{104}	12 August 2004	list
(377347) 2004 RB_{15}	6 September 2004	list
(377397) 2004 RB_{357}	3 September 2004	list
(377596) 2005 QM_{65}	26 August 2005	list
(377968) 2006 KC_{56}	21 May 2006	list
(378381) 2007 QG_{13}	21 August 2007	list
(378427) 2007 RU_{222}	14 September 2007	list
(378469) 2007 TA_{32}	5 October 2007	list
(378574) 2008 DY_{53}	29 February 2008	list

(378685) 2008 JJ_{22}	1 May 2008	list
(378700) 2008 MU	26 June 2008	list
(378702) 2008 OV_{3}	25 July 2008	list
(378707) 2008 PP_{6}	2 August 2008	list
(378711) 2008 PP_{16}	26 July 2008	list
(378712) 2008 PO_{20}	2 August 2008	list
(378713) 2008 PT_{20}	5 August 2008	list
(378714) 2008 PY_{20}	2 August 2008	list
(378715) 2008 PH_{21}	6 August 2008	list
(378733) 2008 QJ_{47}	19 August 2008	list
(379151) 2009 PA_{17}	14 August 2009	list
(379198) 2009 SD_{52}	22 April 2004	list
(379425) 2010 BK_{6}	17 January 2010	list
(379495) 2010 EN_{143}	9 March 2010	list
(379645) 2011 EY_{17}	11 April 2007	list
(379814) 2011 KT_{11}	5 May 2011	list
(379859) 2012 GV_{31}	10 May 2008	list
(379875) 2012 HP_{39}	19 July 2007	list
(379879) 2012 HB_{49}	2 August 2008	list
(379892) 2012 HO_{72}	4 August 2008	list
(379917) 2012 JT_{65}	15 August 2009	list
(380054) 2013 RN_{73}	25 March 2004	list
(380532) 2004 GT_{75}	15 April 2004	list
(380533) 2004 GH_{77}	13 April 2004	list
(380548) 2004 NR_{33}	14 July 2004	list

(380562) 2004 QF_{9}	20 August 2004	list
(380565) 2004 QO_{19}	23 August 2004	list
(380566) 2004 QW_{24}	24 August 2004	list
(380818) 2005 YV_{128}	30 December 2005	list
(380931) 2006 HE_{61}	22 April 2006	list
(381181) 2007 LV_{19}	15 June 2007	list
(381187) 2007 NN_{6}	10 July 2007	list
(381224) 2007 RZ_{278}	5 September 2007	list
(381424) 2008 MC_{5}	29 June 2008	list
(381675) 2009 BX_{79}	30 January 2009	list
(381699) 2009 DY_{127}	20 February 2009	list
(381823) 2009 VZ_{80}	23 July 2009	list
(381946) 2010 DP_{20}	19 February 2010	list
(381980) 2010 GA_{75}	8 April 2010	list
(382121) 2011 HG_{77}	14 September 2007	list
(382141) 2011 KE_{30}	24 March 2006	list
(382179) 2012 JQ_{45}	30 July 2008	list
(382201) 2012 OY_{5}	13 July 2004	list
(382867) 2004 FT_{166}	16 March 2004	list
(382881) 2004 LV_{11}	12 June 2004	list
(382895) 2004 QS_{9}	21 August 2004	list
(382898) 2004 QJ_{19}	23 August 2004	list
(382899) 2004 QM_{27}	23 August 2004	list
(383031) 2005 NS_{125}	4 July 2005	list
(383051) 2005 QJ_{69}	28 August 2005	list

(383060) 2005 QV_{146}	28 August 2005	list
(383348) 2006 QJ_{170}	26 August 2006	list
(383449) 2006 WK_{127}	24 November 2006	list
(383610) 2007 JJ_{35}	14 May 2007	list
(383619) 2007 MP_{27}	23 June 2007	list
(383650) 2007 SN_{18}	20 September 2007	list
(383680) 2007 TU_{240}	5 October 2007	list
(383851) 2008 OQ_{6}	25 July 2008	list
(383858) 2008 PD_{21}	5 August 2008	list
(383861) 2008 QU_{5}	6 August 2008	list
(383864) 2008 QU_{44}	23 August 2008	list
(384046) 2008 UH_{205}	6 September 2008	list
(384061) 2008 UK_{301}	16 April 2007	list
(384196) 2009 BZ_{132}	31 January 2009	list
(384260) 2009 EY_{28}	6 March 2009	list
(384594) 2010 LM_{125}	20 March 2010	list
(384659) 2011 FN_{17}	20 April 2004	list
(384663) 2011 FP_{28}	20 July 2004	list
(384733) 2011 KS_{26}	4 May 2011	list
(384760) 2012 FV_{44}	27 June 2004	list
(384880) 2012 SG_{60}	28 July 2008	list
(384902) 2012 TS_{32}	27 June 2004	list
(385109) 2012 VQ_{97}	3 May 2006	list
(385132) 2013 RO_{31}	3 May 2008	list
(385149) 2013 TP_{35}	31 January 2006	list

(385524) 2004 MR_{8}	29 June 2004	list
(385875) 2006 RJ_{101}	1 September 2006	list
(386085) 2007 LY_{37}	11 June 2007	list
(386259) 2008 EJ_{1}	2 March 2008	list
(386594) 2009 FS_{56}	23 March 2009	list
(386595) 2009 FY_{56}	25 March 2009	list
(386597) 2009 FR_{59}	27 March 2009	list
(386609) 2009 HF_{73}	27 April 2009	list
(386648) 2009 SP_{314}	2 June 2005	list
(386933) 2011 NL_{3}	16 July 2007	list
(386958) 2011 SE_{208}	4 May 2006	list
(386984) 2012 PR_{32}	5 September 2005	list
(386994) 2012 QB_{38}	4 August 2008	list
(386999) 2012 QY_{50}	4 August 2008	list
(387006) 2012 RH_{12}	18 July 2006	list
(387426) 2013 VJ_{20}	29 June 2004	list
(387817) 2004 FK_{22}	16 March 2004	list
(387848) 2004 OR_{10}	22 July 2004	list
(387857) 2004 QA_{10}	21 August 2004	list
(387863) 2004 RW_{74}	19 August 2004	list
(387868) 2004 RA_{166}	6 September 2004	list
(387879) 2004 SL_{10}	16 September 2004	list
(387968) 2005 JL_{21}	4 May 2005	list
(388184) 2006 BY_{271}	31 January 2006	list
(388253) 2006 MJ_{14}	18 June 2006	list

(388555) 2007 NE_{6}	10 July 2007	list
(388666) 2007 TT_{369}	19 July 2007	list
(388892) 2008 RV_{134}	9 September 2008	list
(389290) 2009 JO_{5}	2 May 2009	list
(389517) 2010 GH_{141}	17 March 2010	list
(389694) 2011 QD_{48}	30 August 2011	list
(389812) 2011 UL_{406}	6 August 2005	list
(389856) 2012 RL_{28}	18 November 2004	list
(390158) 2012 VD_{97}	28 July 2011	list
(390283) 2013 AY_{9}	27 June 2004	list
(390407) 2013 YX_{13}	27 July 2005	list
(390411) 2013 YU_{19}	23 August 2007	list
(390482) 2014 AK_{4}	19 July 2004	list
(390819) 2004 LE_{2}	11 June 2004	list
(390820) 2004 LQ_{23}	14 June 2004	list
(390838) 2004 QM_{12}	21 August 2004	list
(391215) 2006 HN_{89}	20 April 2006	list
(391243) 2006 PF_{13}	14 August 2006	list
(391275) 2006 SJ_{134}	26 September 2006	list
(391451) 2007 FE_{20}	23 March 2007	list
(391488) 2007 JE_{35}	11 May 2007	list
(391493) 2007 OJ_{7}	21 July 2007	list
(391530) 2007 RO_{279}	14 August 2007	list
(391531) 2007 RV_{281}	1 September 2007	list
(391545) 2007 TB_{1}	4 October 2007	list

(391763) 2008 EY_{129}	3 August 2004	list
(391789) 2008 RR_{26}	8 September 2008	list
(392183) 2009 PA	1 August 2009	list
(392394) 2010 JN_{153}	9 May 2010	list
(392413) 2010 LV_{130}	9 August 2004	list
(392432) 2010 OM_{110}	15 July 2004	list
(392567) 2011 SG_{111}	15 July 2007	list
(392568) 2011 SU_{115}	28 August 2011	list
(392651) 2011 UA_{162}	12 September 2006	list
(392664) 2011 UY_{283}	18 July 2006	list
(392720) 2012 MD_{15}	6 September 2007	list
(392726) 2012 QD_{39}	12 August 2012	list
(392879) 2012 UX_{161}	26 April 2009	list
(392959) 2012 WC_{29}	21 August 2004	list
(392964) 2012 XW_{7}	22 May 2010	list
(393018) 2012 XG_{151}	6 July 2005	list
(393026) 2012 YE_{4}	14 August 2007	list
(393065) 2013 AX_{78}	18 September 2007	list
(393273) 2013 WU_{68}	5 August 2008	list
(393297) 2013 YW_{65}	23 August 2008	list
(393311) 2013 YM_{142}	13 March 2010	list
(393681) 2004 RV_{251}	15 August 2004	list
(393685) 2004 RC_{357}	15 September 2004	list
(393811) 2005 QH_{147}	28 August 2005	list
(394141) 2006 KV_{38}	24 May 2006	list

(394152) 2006 ON_{21}	28 July 2006	list
(394154) 2006 PH_{20}	18 July 2006	list
(394392) 2007 EP_{88}	15 March 2007	list
(394435) 2007 PD_{4}	8 August 2007	list
(394793) 2008 PR_{21}	6 August 2008	list
(394827) 2008 SO_{139}	23 September 2008	list
(395107) 2009 TL	7 October 2009	list
(395108) 2009 TB_{1}	9 October 2009	list
(395244) 2010 NM_{83}	17 June 2004	list
(395290) 2011 BZ_{65}	15 August 2004	list
(395312) 2011 OY_{14}	8 July 2004	list
(395327) 2011 QN_{8}	1 August 2011	list
(395333) 2011 QR_{26}	4 August 2011	list
(395373) 2011 SP_{30}	22 February 2009	list
(395395) 2011 ST_{102}	22 August 2004	list
(395396) 2011 SD_{103}	19 July 2007	list
(395432) 2011 SS_{212}	28 August 2011	list
(395608) 2011 UM_{358}	19 July 2007	list
(395636) 2011 WJ_{13}	28 August 2006	list
(395671) 2011 WA_{113}	2 October 2005	list
(395760) 2012 VY_{36}	21 August 2006	list
(395870) 2013 AS_{22}	18 May 2005	list
(396043) 2013 CN_{33}	1 September 2011	list
(396090) 2013 CG_{112}	15 September 2007	list
(396254) 2014 CP_{2}	28 March 2009	list

(396258) 2014 CO_{7}	7 April 2006	list
(396459) 2014 FR_{19}	10 August 2005	list
(396538) 2014 GN_{44}	10 July 2007	list
(396788) 2004 GU	9 April 2004	list
(396794) 2004 KT	16 May 2004	list
(396799) 2004 OG_{12}	12 June 2004	list
(396814) 2004 QX_{11}	21 August 2004	list
(397236) 2006 KS_{105}	20 April 2006	list
(397250) 2006 QS_{31}	8 August 2006	list
(397441) 2007 EH_{1}	20 January 2007	list
(397471) 2007 LV	9 June 2007	list
(397474) 2007 PP_{6}	9 August 2007	list
(397789) 2008 JP_{22}	6 May 2008	list
(398014) 2009 CN_{53}	1 February 2009	list
(398041) 2009 EN_{30}	6 March 2009	list
(398052) 2009 GS_{3}	15 April 2009	list
(398081) 2009 JB_{17}	4 May 2009	list
(398106) 2009 SE_{240}	31 August 2009	list
(398221) 2010 OW_{76}	11 August 2004	list
(398282) 2010 UQ_{35}	3 September 2004	list
(398469) 2011 UJ_{120}	18 April 2009	list
(398540) 2011 UE_{322}	6 September 2007	list
(398547) 2011 UQ_{338}	11 August 2007	list
(398571) 2011 WN_{17}	23 June 2007	list
(398618) 2011 YW_{23}	5 August 2005	list

(398645) 2012 TT_{13}	29 November 2008	list
(398904) 2013 CN_{132}	3 August 2004	list
(398925) 2013 CP_{176}	15 April 2009	list
(398954) 2013 DL_{13}	19 March 2005	list
(399162) 2014 FM_{29}	16 July 2004	list
(399631) 2004 OH_{15}	20 July 2004	list
(399639) 2004 QK_{4}	13 July 2004	list
(399640) 2004 QL_{10}	21 August 2004	list
(399642) 2004 QP_{19}	23 August 2004	list
(399675) 2004 SO_{38}	15 August 2004	list
(399756) 2005 JH_{21}	4 May 2005	list
(399758) 2005 JO_{91}	9 May 2005	list
(399789) 2005 PK_{7}	1 August 2005	list
(400023) 2006 PE_{33}	13 August 2006	list
(400659) 2009 HO_{73}	25 February 2009	list
(401153) 2011 WQ_{1}	26 July 2006	list
(401285) 2012 DZ_{26}	3 August 2008	list
(401330) 2013 AU_{55}	13 August 2007	list
(401357) 2013 BD_{23}	16 May 2006	list
(401365) 2013 BM_{45}	12 November 2004	list
(401370) 2013 BM_{66}	31 August 2011	list
(401389) 2013 CB_{34}	25 February 2009	list
(401391) 2013 CD_{38}	29 March 2009	list
(401486) 2013 DB_{3}	2 April 2005	list
(401788) 2014 FB_{54}	21 July 2004	list

(401805) 2014 HK_{172}	30 July 2006	list
(401806) 2014 HN_{176}	13 July 2004	list
(402142) 2004 RT_{14}	6 September 2004	list
(402540) 2006 GD_{49}	1 April 2006	list
(402556) 2006 PX_{27}	14 August 2006	list
(403349) 2009 FV_{55}	17 March 2009	list
(403355) 2009 FY_{74}	27 March 2009	list
(403547) 2010 HB_{104}	16 April 2010	list
(403586) 2010 PN_{10}	19 March 2005	list
(403595) 2010 QN_{2}	21 August 2010	list
(403926) 2012 AY_{16}	20 February 2007	list
(404023) 2012 CE_{29}	11 March 2008	list
(404115) 2013 AG	15 June 2010	list
(404135) 2013 CH_{2}	27 February 2009	list
(404151) 2013 CQ_{33}	12 May 2008	list
(404314) 2013 ET_{127}	27 February 2009	list
(404442) 2013 GT_{101}	17 November 2004	list
(404540) 2013 JM_{19}	21 August 2004	list
(404627) 2014 HW_{1}	15 July 2007	list
(404695) 2014 HP_{186}	29 July 2004	list
(404828) 2014 JO_{75}	11 June 2007	list
(404849) 2014 KQ_{15}	8 February 2008	list
(404869) 2014 KV_{42}	1 July 2009	list
(404936) 2014 MN_{7}	5 October 2007	list
(404942) 2014 MJ_{20}	16 March 2004	list

(405477) 2004 WE	17 November 2004	list
(405553) 2005 LP_{5}	2 June 2005	list
(405561) 2005 NQ_{123}	10 July 2005	list
(405585) 2005 SF_{9}	8 August 2005	list
(405955) 2006 SR_{6}	16 September 2006	list
(406773) 2008 OM_{22}	26 July 2008	list
(406776) 2008 PB_{21}	3 August 2008	list
(406924) 2009 FR_{56}	23 March 2009	list
(406939) 2009 HO_{74}	22 February 2009	list
(407088) 2009 SG_{255}	16 September 2009	list
(407299) 2010 KB_{88}	29 July 2006	list
(407461) 2010 UT_{56}	1 May 2008	list
(407841) 2012 BJ_{30}	10 March 2008	list
(407881) 2012 BP_{103}	22 February 2007	list
(408265) 2013 FA_{16}	8 August 2010	list
(408358) 2013 GU_{89}	26 June 2006	list
(408394) 2013 GQ_{109}	8 June 2005	list
(408534) 2013 JD_{51}	28 July 2008	list
(408538) 2013 JY_{53}	17 July 2009	list
(408656) 2014 ML_{20}	21 July 2004	list
(408666) 2014 MT_{28}	20 July 2009	list
(409255) 2004 GX_{75}	30 March 2004	list
(409258) 2004 HE_{59}	24 April 2004	list
(409440) 2005 OK_{31}	27 July 2005	list
(409442) 2005 QD_{5}	24 August 2005	list

(409829) 2006 OX_{21}	31 July 2006	list
(409830) 2006 PH_{5}	31 July 2006	list
(409934) 2006 UG_{64}	23 October 2006	list
(410170) 2007 PZ_{28}	14 August 2007	list
(410611) 2008 MM	24 June 2008	list
(410678) 2008 UC_{205}	24 October 2008	list
(410788) 2009 FT_{73}	27 March 2009	list
(410830) 2009 PT_{18}	1 August 2009	list
(410832) 2009 QO_{8}	18 August 2009	list
(410840) 2009 QA_{56}	31 August 2009	list
(411705) 2011 YN_{69}	16 April 2004	list
(411707) 2011 YB_{70}	2 May 2008	list
(411999) 2012 KE_{12}	26 August 2008	list
(412137) 2013 GX_{51}	26 April 2009	list
(412167) 2013 GW_{87}	19 July 2009	list
(412242) 2013 HE_{24}	1 August 2005	list
(412292) 2013 JR_{35}	16 May 2004	list
(412302) 2013 JL_{48}	31 August 2009	list
(412303) 2013 JX_{48}	18 July 2006	list
(412391) 2013 RM_{78}	4 May 2006	list
(412428) 2014 EN_{4}	23 August 2008	list
(412505) 2014 KM_{85}	30 May 2006	list
(412692) 2014 OF_{257}	18 July 2006	list
(413371) 2004 GN_{39}	15 April 2004	list
(413372) 2004 GQ_{39}	15 April 2004	list

(413374) 2004 GH_{78}	9 April 2004	list
(413989) 2007 EL_{88}	14 March 2007	list
(414276) 2008 JF_{32}	1 May 2008	list
(414282) 2008 MN_{3}	28 June 2008	list
(414284) 2008 ML_{5}	29 June 2008	list
(414296) 2008 QJ_{44}	23 August 2008	list
(414308) 2008 RJ_{76}	6 August 2008	list
(414465) 2009 HK_{95}	29 April 2009	list
(414478) 2009 PG_{6}	18 July 2009	list
(415352) 2013 JN_{37}	27 June 2008	list
(415390) 2013 ND_{12}	2 May 2008	list
(415523) 2014 QC_{32}	17 August 2007	list
(415685) 2014 RY_{33}	14 July 2004	list
(415814) 2001 PQ_{67}	5 August 2005	list
(416603) 2004 PO_{99}	3 August 2004	list
(416761) 2005 EL_{200}	12 March 2005	list
(416778) 2005 FY_{4}	30 March 2005	list
(416780) 2005 GZ_{9}	1 April 2005	list
(416812) 2005 GW_{178}	15 April 2005	list
(416848) 2005 LJ_{52}	2 June 2005	list
(416877) 2005 QR_{21}	1 August 2005	list
(417201) 2005 XM_{4}	4 December 2005	list
(417444) 2006 OE_{2}	20 July 2006	list
(417451) 2006 PP_{43}	7 August 2006	list
(417452) 2006 QE_{13}	16 August 2006	list

(417496) 2006 SD_{64}	19 September 2006	list
(417516) 2006 SU_{291}	19 September 2006	list
(417655) 2006 YF_{13}	26 December 2006	list
(417867) 2007 MO	16 June 2007	list
(417882) 2007 PS_{48}	11 August 2007	list
(418198) 2008 CN_{70}	9 February 2008	list
(418403) 2008 KD_{12}	12 May 2008	list
(418420) 2008 MK_{5}	27 June 2008	list
(418421) 2008 NB_{4}	11 July 2008	list
(418422) 2008 NA_{5}	10 July 2008	list
(418426) 2008 OQ_{3}	25 July 2008	list
(418438) 2008 PX_{21}	6 August 2008	list
(418447) 2008 QW_{43}	23 August 2008	list
(418484) 2008 RF_{106}	6 September 2008	list
(418896) 2009 AK_{15}	6 January 2009	list
(419010) 2009 PY_{16}	1 August 2009	list
(419130) 2009 SK_{242}	8 July 2004	list
(419157) 2009 SN_{337}	27 September 2009	list
(419265) 2009 VU_{105}	15 July 2004	list
(419424) 2010 BB_{6}	20 January 2010	list
(419425) 2010 BC_{6}	20 January 2010	list
(419713) 2010 UO_{93}	9 March 2008	list
(419803) 2010 WH_{50}	12 February 2008	list
(420076) 2011 EU_{32}	26 July 2008	list
(420154) 2011 FU_{141}	7 March 2011	list

(420223) 2011 HO_{28}	19 March 2005	list
(420262) 2011 KD_{11}	25 May 2011	list
(420285) 2011 QR_{47}	24 August 2011	list
(420577) 2012 HU_{24}	14 March 2005	list
(420711) 2012 LC_{23}	29 September 2005	list
(420729) 2012 RL_{17}	3 August 2008	list
(420755) 2013 EU	23 July 2011	list
(420794) 2013 GE_{132}	18 July 2009	list
(420805) 2013 HB_{15}	28 May 2008	list
(420844) 2013 JC_{44}	11 May 2013	list
(420845) 2013 JH_{44}	13 August 2009	list
(420877) 2013 KJ_{18}	13 August 2010	list
(420915) 2013 ML_{7}	16 February 2010	list
(420986) 2013 PK_{34}	25 March 2004	list
(421156) 2013 RW_{35}	13 July 2004	list
(421209) 2013 SS_{21}	20 May 2006	list
(421389) 2013 UM_{12}	23 August 2008	list
(421974) 2014 QA_{297}	21 August 2004	list
(422145) 2014 QT_{437}	5 July 2005	list
(422232) 2014 RL_{63}	17 July 2010	list
(422333) 2014 SQ_{215}	16 August 2006	list
(422368) 2014 SP_{249}	22 August 2004	list
(422378) 2014 SF_{262}	12 October 2006	list
(422444) 2014 SM_{304}	10 May 2008	list
(422560) 2014 TY_{38}	16 August 2006	list

(422580) 2014 TB_{57}	21 August 2004	list
(423173) 2004 FS_{166}	25 March 2004	list
(423206) 2004 RK_{6}	20 July 2004	list
(423351) 2005 GU_{178}	15 April 2005	list
(423420) 2005 OJ_{31}	25 July 2005	list
(423425) 2005 PL_{17}	6 August 2005	list
(424198) 2007 LX_{37}	10 June 2007	list
(424249) 2007 RN_{275}	6 September 2007	list
(424649) 2008 PG_{20}	11 July 2008	list
(424965) 2009 AM_{15}	6 January 2009	list
(425009) 2009 DZ_{88}	22 February 2009	list
(425518) 2010 LF_{1}	24 March 2004	list
(425533) 2010 OO_{96}	16 September 2006	list
(425682) 2011 AA_{30}	9 April 2004	list
(425711) 2011 BZ_{22}	19 February 2007	list
(425789) 2011 CL_{79}	16 April 2007	list
(426014) 2011 KN_{31}	15 July 2007	list
(426067) 2012 BL_{131}	28 March 2009	list
(426300) 2012 TE_{131}	26 July 2008	list
(426366) 2013 NQ_{21}	7 July 2013	list
(426425) 2013 QR_{16}	7 June 2008	list
(426466) 2013 QW_{82}	5 August 2005	list
(426558) 2013 RV_{91}	13 May 2008	list
(426608) 2013 SS_{43}	18 July 2009	list
(426633) 2013 SO_{66}	5 July 2005	list

(426653) 2013 SA_{82}	27 June 2006	list
(426663) 2013 TR_{3}	3 August 2008	list
(426725) 2013 TM_{52}	23 August 2008	list
(426803) 2013 TO_{136}	10 September 2008	list
(426818) 2013 TU_{145}	22 August 2004	list
(426850) 2013 VB_{21}	4 August 2008	list
(426885) 2013 WD_{50}	29 June 2008	list
(426892) 2013 WL_{57}	5 August 2008	list
(426942) 2013 YF_{8}	16 March 2004	list
(426966) 2013 YV_{71}	22 August 2004	list
(427007) 2014 RP_{18}	8 June 2005	list
(427023) 2014 SP_{219}	10 September 2008	list
(427152) 2014 UN_{175}	8 August 2005	list
(427733) 2004 PQ_{84}	29 July 2004	list
(427734) 2004 QA_{13}	21 August 2004	list
(427751) 2004 SD_{12}	16 September 2004	list
(427861) 2005 OV_{31}	25 July 2005	list
(427862) 2005 PV_{4}	7 August 2005	list
(428086) 2006 NM	3 July 2006	list
(428090) 2006 PU_{32}	15 August 2006	list
(428681) 2008 JA_{8}	5 May 2008	list
(428691) 2008 MD_{5}	29 June 2008	list
(428695) 2008 ON_{18}	28 July 2008	list
(428700) 2008 QM_{19}	3 August 2008	list
(428702) 2008 QL_{38}	23 August 2008	list

(429094) 2009 SG_{2}	18 September 2009	list
(429117) 2009 SF_{236}	2 August 2009	list
(429389) 2010 PR_{10}	6 August 2010	list
(429532) 2011 BW_{95}	28 July 2008	list
(429679) 2011 HE_{6}	14 March 2007	list
(429729) 2011 KF_{29}	10 June 2007	list
(429735) 2011 MA	19 June 2011	list
(429736) 2011 MB_{2}	24 June 2011	list
(429860) 2012 RN_{31}	15 June 2004	list
(429895) 2012 TB_{79}	12 March 2011	list
(430079) 2013 SG_{50}	8 September 2008	list
(430342) 2013 YQ_{70}	23 August 2008	list
(430389) 2014 WB_{397}	27 July 2005	list
(430748) 2004 NJ_{30}	30 June 2004	list
(430749) 2004 NW_{33}	13 July 2004	list
(430864) 2005 OM_{14}	31 July 2005	list
(431785) 2008 OZ_{9}	26 July 2008	list
(431789) 2008 PM_{8}	26 July 2008	list
(431790) 2008 PA_{11}	14 June 2008	list
(431800) 2008 QN_{35}	26 August 2008	list
(432237) 2009 OG_{22}	31 July 2009	list
(432814) 2011 GV_{70}	4 April 2011	list
(432899) 2011 OV_{20}	23 July 2011	list
(432921) 2011 SB_{110}	29 August 2011	list
(433004) 2012 QQ_{41}	19 July 2012	list

(433010) 2012 RT_{18}	19 August 2008	list
(433012) 2012 RO_{19}	23 August 2008	list
(433055) 2012 SZ_{63}	14 August 2006	list
(433083) 2012 TR_{75}	7 March 2011	list
(433130) 2012 TZ_{185}	10 June 2007	list
(433233) 2012 VK_{43}	21 August 2007	list
(433260) 2012 XP_{63}	10 July 2007	list
(433301) 2013 LD_{29}	3 July 2008	list
(433435) 2013 TE_{111}	6 September 2004	list
(433534) 2013 WQ_{87}	13 July 2004	list
(433542) 2013 WT_{105}	28 July 2006	list
(433551) 2013 XA_{5}	25 July 2008	list
(433586) 2013 YW_{40}	3 July 2005	list
(433609) 2013 YN_{86}	23 August 2008	list
(433628) 2013 YH_{127}	8 September 2008	list
(434339) 2004 MQ_{8}	27 June 2004	list
(434442) 2005 NE_{49}	10 July 2005	list
(434486) 2005 RA_{32}	5 August 2005	list
(434751) 2006 HV_{57}	29 April 2006	list
(435159) 2007 LQ_{19}	13 June 2007	list
(435221) 2007 RT_{278}	5 September 2007	list
(435543) 2008 OJ_{23}	25 July 2008	list
(435562) 2008 RX_{27}	1 September 2008	list
(435610) 2008 SA_{70}	6 August 2008	list
(436003) 2009 FQ_{56}	23 March 2009	list

(436245) 2010 BE_{6}	24 January 2010	list
(436254) 2010 BY_{94}	30 July 2006	list
(436384) 2010 TD_{19}	6 October 2010	list
(436695) 2011 ST_{247}	5 September 2005	list
(436709) 2011 UT_{17}	10 August 2005	list
(436739) 2011 UK_{406}	6 August 2005	list
(436777) 2012 MQ_{2}	15 August 2005	list
(436869) 2012 TJ_{14}	6 July 2005	list
(436948) 2012 TO_{142}	11 September 2012	list
(436949) 2012 TE_{147}	4 August 2008	list
(437241) 2012 XH_{24}	8 August 2007	list
(437249) 2012 XV_{51}	22 July 2007	list
(437371) 2013 VO_{9}	6 September 2005	list
(437428) 2013 XS_{22}	8 September 2008	list
(437460) 2013 YR_{20}	1 September 2008	list
(437516) 2013 YK_{91}	20 July 2012	list
(437791) 2015 CT_{40}	6 September 2004	list
(438107) 2005 GY_{110}	10 April 2005	list
(438313) 2006 HX_{109}	20 April 2006	list
(438317) 2006 JX	4 May 2006	list
(438321) 2006 KU_{8}	8 May 2006	list
(438439) 2006 WD_{131}	20 November 2006	list
(438494) 2007 NR_{6}	15 July 2007	list
(438499) 2007 PO_{45}	12 August 2007	list
(438661) 2008 EP_{6}	5 March 2008	list

(438693) 2008 PL_{15}	26 July 2008	list
(438768) 2008 UB_{264}	4 August 2008	list
(438851) 2009 DO_{13}	30 July 2005	list
(439001) 2010 VE_{82}	15 September 2004	list
(439085) 2011 PN_{12}	28 July 2011	list
(439086) 2011 QP_{5}	5 May 2006	list
(439188) 2011 WK_{144}	5 July 2005	list
(439364) 2012 YP_{8}	20 November 2006	list
(439386) 2013 AB_{110}	29 February 2008	list
(439391) 2013 AU_{129}	31 August 2011	list
(439437) 2013 NK_{4}	1 July 2013	list
(439502) 2014 AB_{46}	21 January 2006	list
(439529) 2014 BO_{64}	23 August 2007	list
(439710) 2014 LK_{11}	27 March 2009	list
(440199) 2004 GP_{39}	15 April 2004	list
(440202) 2004 HN_{63}	29 March 2004	list
(440211) 2004 NZ_{32}	15 July 2004	list
(440229) 2004 PE_{104}	23 June 2004	list
(440245) 2004 RM_{14}	6 September 2004	list
(440246) 2004 RY_{14}	6 September 2004	list
(440309) 2004 SC_{3}	6 September 2004	list
(440415) 2005 QR_{68}	28 August 2005	list
(441058) 2007 PH_{25}	12 August 2007	list
(441060) 2007 PR_{45}	13 August 2007	list
(441140) 2007 TC_{143}	15 October 2007	list

(441456) 2008 OT_{3}	25 July 2008	list
(441524) 2008 SP_{185}	24 September 2008	list
(441633) 2008 VB_{68}	5 November 2008	list
(441819) 2009 NW_{1}	11 July 2009	list
(442155) 2010 VA_{195}	12 May 2004	list
(442223) 2011 KX	21 August 2004	list
(442227) 2011 KA_{31}	21 July 2004	list
(442243) 2011 MD_{11}	26 June 2011	list
(442244) 2011 OD_{2}	25 April 2006	list
(442274) 2011 QR_{72}	1 August 2011	list
(442326) 2011 SR_{134}	4 November 2007	list
(442465) 2011 UA_{281}	29 September 2005	list
(442495) 2011 VN_{18}	26 July 2006	list
(442541) 2011 YQ_{13}	11 August 2004	list
(442610) 2012 KS_{44}	5 September 2007	list
(442750) 2012 WG_{24}	21 April 2006	list
(442909) 2013 CS_{19}	18 September 2007	list
(443131) 2014 BL_{9}	14 July 2004	list
(443303) 2014 FJ_{23}	20 April 2010	list
(443354) 2014 GO_{35}	27 July 2004	list
(443402) 2014 HU_{37}	22 July 2004	list
(443431) 2014 HS_{130}	29 August 2011	list
(443464) 2014 HL_{190}	28 July 2011	list
(443737) 2015 LT_{29}	28 August 2011	list
(443749) 2015 LM_{39}	27 June 2008	list

(443773) 2015 MB_{59}	16 August 2004	list
(443778) 2015 MX_{67}	21 August 2004	list
(444023) 2004 GH_{13}	12 April 2004	list
(444031) 2004 PQ_{16}	7 August 2004	list
(444037) 2004 PG_{51}	27 June 2004	list
(444044) 2004 QR_{10}	21 August 2004	list
(444045) 2004 QY_{26}	21 August 2004	list
(444079) 2004 RT_{315}	15 September 2004	list
(444088) 2004 SO_{51}	19 August 2004	list
(444157) 2005 GP_{22}	5 April 2005	list
(444477) 2006 PE_{28}	18 July 2006	list
(445025) 2008 NS_{1}	5 July 2008	list
(445026) 2008 OX_{3}	25 July 2008	list
(445244) 2009 OX_{22}	19 July 2009	list
(445369) 2010 OP_{126}	19 July 2010	list
(445573) 2011 QG_{42}	1 August 2011	list
(446105) 2013 DN_{4}	29 August 2011	list
(446317) 2014 FT_{22}	25 July 2008	list
(446407) 2014 JN	18 May 2005	list
(446413) 2014 JU_{4}	11 August 2009	list
(446474) 2014 KA_{4}	16 September 2006	list
(446535) 2014 MR_{17}	15 August 2006	list
(446555) 2014 NM_{65}	16 March 2004	list
(446640) 2015 ME_{121}	3 June 2005	list
(446662) 2015 NK_{16}	16 June 2004	list

(446742) 2015 PH	23 October 2006	list
(446754) 2015 PY_{8}	3 August 2008	list
(446764) 2015 PO_{34}	2 July 2011	list
(446776) 2015 PA_{60}	28 June 2008	list
(446780) 2015 PK_{230}	17 March 2010	list
(447014) 2004 GO_{20}	9 April 2004	list
(447035) 2004 RR_{14}	6 September 2004	list
(447038) 2004 RF_{25}	6 September 2004	list
(447077) 2004 SS_{58}	18 September 2004	list
(447090) 2004 TT_{65}	23 August 2004	list
(447221) 2005 UO_{5}	27 October 2005	list
(447470) 2006 QE_{38}	16 August 2006	list
(447471) 2006 QF_{38}	16 August 2006	list
(447739) 2007 GM_{25}	13 April 2007	list
(448093) 2008 JB_{37}	12 May 2008	list
(448115) 2008 QU	28 June 2008	list
(448120) 2008 RF_{80}	2 September 2008	list
(448339) 2009 FQ_{31}	28 March 2009	list
(448403) 2009 RQ_{65}	15 September 2009	list
(448422) 2009 SJ_{255}	16 September 2009	list
(448596) 2010 TW_{114}	21 August 2004	list
(448706) 2010 XQ_{58}	11 August 2004	list
(448805) 2011 TG_{6}	28 August 2011	list
(448950) 2011 WC_{66}	18 July 2006	list
(449122) 2013 AG_{6}	20 March 2010	list

(449259) 2013 EF	10 September 2008	list
(449273) 2013 EA_{33}	19 March 2005	list
(449542) 2014 HT_{124}	29 August 2011	list
(449638) 2014 KW_{26}	15 July 2007	list
(449663) 2014 KA_{80}	20 April 2004	list
(449870) 2015 MS_{58}	3 August 2004	list
(450130) 2015 SP_{3}	23 May 2006	list
(450286) 2004 HQ_{5}	9 April 2004	list
(450287) 2004 HB_{46}	21 April 2004	list
(450300) 2004 QD_{14}	24 August 2004	list
(450378) 2005 JG_{21}	4 May 2005	list
(450563) 2006 FN_{36}	19 March 2006	list
(450565) 2006 FM_{46}	26 March 2006	list
(450583) 2006 QC_{101}	26 August 2006	list
(450649) 2006 UY_{64}	25 October 2006	list
(450779) 2007 SE_{11}	20 September 2007	list
(450966) 2008 PK_{8}	26 July 2008	list
(451124) 2009 KC_{3}	23 May 2009	list
(451142) 2009 QY_{58}	31 August 2009	list
(451320) 2010 VS_{48}	21 July 2004	list
(451369) 2010 XG_{83}	16 August 2004	list
(451409) 2011 OF_{24}	28 July 2011	list
(451487) 2011 UA_{155}	14 August 2007	list
(451542) 2011 WU_{90}	28 August 2006	list
(451578) 2012 AE_{14}	23 March 2007	list

(451850) 2014 AT_{32}	20 February 2009	list
(451896) 2014 JN_{54}	7 October 2004	list
(451914) 2014 KU_{38}	15 June 2010	list
(451939) 2014 MQ_{1}	28 July 2011	list
(451957) 2014 MR_{53}	15 November 2009	list
(452249) 2015 TH_{94}	23 August 2008	list
(452499) 2004 QP_{10}	21 August 2004	list
(452577) 2005 EA_{189}	10 March 2005	list
(452617) 2005 QX_{147}	28 August 2005	list
(452810) 2006 LE_{4}	7 June 2006	list
(452813) 2006 PA_{20}	30 July 2006	list
(452816) 2006 PM_{27}	13 August 2006	list
(452836) 2006 RT_{99}	12 September 2006	list
(453107) 2007 XW_{9}	14 September 2004	list
(453232) 2008 KV_{38}	12 May 2008	list
(453236) 2008 PQ_{8}	26 July 2008	list
(453406) 2009 FH_{56}	19 March 2009	list
(453411) 2009 GH_{3}	23 February 2009	list
(453430) 2009 PU	2 August 2009	list
(453775) 2011 HQ_{5}	29 June 2008	list
(453892) 2011 UY_{194}	15 July 2007	list
(454060) 2012 JX_{23}	29 April 2006	list
(454076) 2012 UE_{174}	13 March 2011	list
(454203) 2013 HY_{16}	20 April 2013	list
(454266) 2014 FM_{7}	1 October 2008	list

(454321) 2014 KQ_{40}	28 August 2011	list
(454342) 2014 LC_{15}	3 June 2005	list
(454373) 2014 ME_{47}	26 August 2005	list
(454377) 2014 MR_{52}	12 March 2013	list
(454389) 2014 MJ_{69}	26 June 2006	list
(454743) 2014 UH_{126}	14 May 2007	list
(454770) 2014 WE_{253}	13 August 2009	list
(454836) 2015 RY_{213}	6 September 2004	list
(454903) 2015 TA_{110}	17 November 2004	list
(454948) 2015 TJ_{192}	29 August 2011	list
(454961) 2015 TH_{199}	10 July 2007	list
(455030) 2015 TO_{339}	31 August 2009	list
(455082) 2015 UR_{53}	13 August 2006	list
(455089) 2015 UZ_{66}	26 July 2011	list
(455554) 2004 MQ_{1}	17 June 2004	list
(455633) 2004 WR_{12}	17 November 2004	list
(455795) 2005 SF	21 September 2005	list
(456156) 2006 FU_{33}	26 March 2006	list
(456189) 2006 HB_{85}	26 April 2006	list
(456257) 2006 QM_{132}	22 August 2006	list
(456537) 2007 BG	18 January 2007	list
(456637) 2007 PR_{48}	10 August 2007	list
(456898) 2007 VG_{184}	11 November 2007	list
(457240) 2008 OT_{6}	26 July 2008	list
(457254) 2008 QL_{35}	25 August 2008	list

(457768) 2009 KN_{4}	23 May 2009	list
(458116) 2010 DA	16 February 2010	list
(458243) 2010 TT_{41}	29 April 2009	list
(458418) 2011 AM_{12}	8 January 2011	list
(458452) 2011 BR_{15}	25 January 2011	list
(458637) 2011 FB_{156}	26 April 2006	list
(458775) 2011 SK_{97}	31 August 2011	list
(458816) 2011 SF_{274}	3 August 2004	list
(458820) 2011 TT_{14}	28 August 2011	list
(458978) 2011 WV_{63}	8 August 2007	list
(459229) 2012 EA_{5}	5 July 2005	list
(459336) 2012 HF_{39}	13 April 2012	list
(459444) 2012 UF_{158}	31 March 2011	list
(459489) 2013 CH_{119}	9 May 2010	list
(459527) 2013 EW_{127}	12 March 2013	list
(459650) 2013 JE_{48}	2 June 2005	list
(459678) 2013 LJ_{33}	19 May 2013	list
(459732) 2013 QK	26 July 2008	list
(459734) 2013 QO_{2}	15 April 2004	list
(459749) 2013 QF_{35}	4 August 2008	list
(459789) 2013 RR_{51}	6 May 2008	list
(459875) 2014 GR_{49}	26 August 2012	list
(459877) 2014 HL_{66}	29 July 2011	list
(459882) 2014 JQ_{37}	20 July 2006	list
(459918) 2014 MT_{38}	21 August 2007	list

(459924) 2014 MF_{50}	9 September 2007	list
(459958) 2014 NS_{57}	8 August 2010	list
(460009) 2014 OJ_{112}	26 July 2008	list
(460052) 2014 OC_{199}	20 May 2013	list
(460207) 2014 QO_{166}	28 July 2006	list
(460307) 2014 QW_{377}	4 August 2008	list
(460352) 2014 RM_{40}	6 August 2007	list
(460466) 2014 SK_{264}	31 July 2009	list
(460539) 2014 TX_{40}	15 August 2009	list
(460713) 2014 VB	30 July 2005	list
(461013) 2014 WV_{388}	25 August 2008	list
(461099) 2015 BR_{97}	12 June 2004	list
(461234) 2015 WE_{6}	29 March 2009	list
(461576) 2004 PA_{3}	3 August 2004	list
(461595) 2004 RM_{335}	15 September 2004	list
(461680) 2005 LD_{8}	6 June 2005	list
(461873) 2006 JZ_{4}	27 March 2006	list
(461904) 2006 PG_{20}	14 August 2006	list
(461923) 2006 SS_{56}	28 July 2006	list
(461997) 2006 WS_{130}	11 October 2006	list
(462347) 2008 QK_{44}	23 August 2008	list
(462438) 2008 TQ_{175}	1 September 2008	list
(463082) 2011 PD_{1}	4 August 2011	list
(463262) 2012 GE_{7}	15 July 2004	list
(463343) 2012 PA_{35}	11 August 2012	list

(463354) 2012 RG_{25}	29 July 2006	list
(463364) 2012 TR_{105}	28 June 2006	list
(463659) 2013 WC_{67}	21 July 2012	list
(463703) 2014 PL_{65}	23 September 2006	list
(463749) 2014 RV_{12}	26 July 2011	list
(463914) 2014 UL_{135}	16 May 2004	list
(464176) 2015 AN_{140}	28 July 2008	list
(464399) 2016 BP_{13}	7 August 2007	list
(464888) 2005 MU_{7}	29 May 2005	list
(464893) 2005 QQ_{140}	28 August 2005	list
(465354) 2008 AV_{9}	3 June 2005	list
(465419) 2008 OW_{3}	25 July 2008	list
(465426) 2008 PM_{21}	6 August 2008	list
(465428) 2008 QY_{43}	23 August 2008	list
(465444) 2008 RU_{134}	8 September 2008	list
(465619) 2009 FJ_{22}	18 March 2009	list
(465749) 2009 WO_{6}	18 October 2009	list
(466018) 2011 HR_{21}	16 July 2007	list
(466051) 2011 OG_{49}	28 July 2011	list
(466130) 2012 FZ_{23}	23 March 2012	list
(466182) 2012 KF_{16}	27 June 2008	list
(466217) 2012 SP_{56}	5 September 2007	list
(466218) 2012 SF_{62}	16 August 2006	list
(466250) 2013 FE_{8}	4 March 2013	list
(466252) 2013 GA_{72}	10 April 2013	list

(466298) 2013 QY_{10}	30 July 2008	list
(466416) 2013 TX_{4}	9 May 2005	list
(466490) 2013 WK_{11}	20 July 2012	list
(466503) 2013 YJ_{103}	25 August 2004	list
(466530) 2014 SR	11 December 2010	list
(466601) 2014 UC_{193}	6 September 2004	list
(466759) 2015 AX_{133}	21 August 2004	list
(466962) 2016 AR_{185}	2 April 2005	list
(467373) 2004 QX_{24}	24 August 2004	list
(467376) 2004 RX_{79}	20 July 2004	list
(467469) 2006 PP_{28}	28 July 2006	list
(467470) 2006 QQ_{12}	16 August 2006	list
(467633) 2008 QQ_{34}	26 August 2008	list
(467649) 2008 SN_{211}	6 September 2008	list
(467730) 2009 JY_{17}	4 May 2009	list
(467918) 2011 OU_{26}	16 February 2010	list
(468074) 2013 TB_{7}	2 August 2009	list
(468094) 2013 UL_{13}	17 August 2009	list
(468303) 2015 FO_{339}	11 April 2007	list
(468350) 2016 EH_{113}	20 April 2012	list
(468541) 2006 QA_{31}	23 August 2006	list
(468812) 2012 MT_{7}	11 August 2004	list
(468815) 2012 QW_{50}	20 July 2012	list
(468907) 2014 BC_{43}	16 August 2012	list
(469272) 2016 JO_{32}	30 June 2004	list

(469604) 2004 GK_{13}	12 April 2004	list
(469614) 2004 NG_{30}	15 July 2004	list
(469616) 2004 QY_{9}	21 August 2004	list
(469747) 2005 PE_{4}	6 August 2005	list
(469771) 2005 QD_{68}	28 August 2005	list
(470215) 2006 WP_{29}	22 November 2006	list
(470315) 2007 NY_{4}	9 June 2007	list
(470594) 2008 MN_{1}	29 June 2008	list
(470945) 2009 HN_{106}	26 April 2009	list
(470952) 2009 OM_{10}	1 July 2009	list
(470999) 2009 SU_{147}	9 April 2004	list
(471138) 2010 EY_{69}	13 March 2010	list
(471140) 2010 EX_{104}	16 February 2010	list
(471323) 2011 KW_{15}	26 May 2011	list
(471349) 2011 QO_{57}	29 August 2011	list
(471582) 2012 RE_{9}	13 July 2004	list
(471702) 2012 TV_{258}	28 July 2011	list
(471825) 2012 XF_{37}	18 September 2007	list
(471864) 2013 AY_{28}	16 October 2011	list
(472219) 2014 FB	16 July 2004	list
(472287) 2014 WU_{119}	14 May 2013	list
(472331) 2015 AM_{203}	26 August 2008	list
(472353) 2015 BF_{18}	18 March 2004	list
(472623) 2015 DL_{181}	16 May 2007	list
(472686) 2015 EV_{63}	14 July 2004	list

(472717) 2015 FY_{48}	12 April 2004	list
(472854) 2015 FV_{292}	17 June 2007	list
(473106) 2015 HQ_{172}	15 May 2004	list
(473230) 2015 KP_{151}	4 August 2008	list
(473239) 2015 LL_{6}	25 July 2008	list
(473346) 2015 TL_{193}	7 June 2006	list
(473445) 2015 XP_{3}	11 March 2008	list
(473474) 2015 XC_{70}	18 July 2006	list
(473475) 2015 XG_{71}	21 July 2004	list
(473578) 2015 XD_{230}	5 July 2005	list
(473597) 2015 XH_{257}	3 May 2013	list
(473753) 2016 EB_{18}	12 July 2013	list
(473776) 2016 EQ_{78}	2 April 2005	list
(474068) 2016 JC_{16}	23 July 2009	list
(474088) 2016 KB_{2}	3 July 2008	list
(474787) 2005 QK_{147}	28 August 2005	list
(475428) 2006 PJ_{20}	22 June 2006	list
(475430) 2006 QW_{11}	16 August 2006	list
(475435) 2006 QR_{130}	30 July 2006	list
(475952) 2007 FU_{35}	23 March 2007	list
(475976) 2007 NL_{6}	10 July 2007	list
(475979) 2007 PM_{4}	16 July 2007	list
(477599) 2010 KT_{7}	18 May 2010	list
(477687) 2010 RE_{65}	12 July 2004	list
(477744) 2010 TX_{177}	20 July 2004	list

(477849) 2011 FH_{152}	11 August 2007	list
(477917) 2011 OK_{1}	2 July 2011	list
(477948) 2011 QF_{98}	28 August 2011	list
(478140) 2011 UL_{138}	27 July 2005	list
(478450) 2012 KJ_{45}	19 May 2012	list
(478453) 2012 LT_{4}	10 June 2012	list
(478455) 2012 NV_{1}	15 July 2012	list
(478546) 2012 TU_{25}	6 August 2008	list
(478683) 2012 TE_{302}	5 August 2008	list
(478836) 2012 VG_{40}	29 July 2011	list
(478974) 2012 XL_{103}	20 February 2009	list
(478980) 2012 XU_{111}	4 May 2009	list
(479019) 2012 YL_{3}	14 August 2007	list
(479348) 2013 WF_{74}	10 January 2010	list
(479357) 2013 XP_{2}	15 February 2008	list
(479572) 2014 CU_{11}	22 February 2009	list
(480018) 2014 XK_{37}	19 February 2010	list
(480200) 2015 FR_{344}	5 April 2011	list
(480257) 2015 HP_{61}	14 August 2007	list
(480283) 2015 HC_{114}	20 July 2004	list
(480374) 2015 KL_{36}	11 August 2007	list
(480504) 2015 LN_{38}	24 August 2011	list
(480549) 2015 MH_{56}	2 May 2009	list
(480727) 2016 JK_{18}	25 June 2009	list
(480745) 2016 NN_{21}	30 July 2012	list

(480788) 2016 PH_{30}	21 September 2008	list
(480799) 2016 PN_{57}	8 September 2005	list
(481032) 2004 YZ_{23}	22 December 2004	list
(481048) 2005 GA_{10}	1 April 2005	list
(481052) 2005 HD_{4}	30 April 2005	list
(481062) 2005 NG_{80}	6 July 2005	list
(481064) 2005 QU_{4}	25 July 2005	list
(481099) 2005 ST_{289}	29 September 2005	list
(481200) 2005 UC_{480}	30 July 2005	list
(481362) 2006 FT_{50}	26 March 2006	list
(481406) 2006 SJ_{291}	16 September 2006	list
(481508) 2007 EW_{87}	22 February 2007	list
(481537) 2007 NK_{6}	10 July 2007	list
(481620) 2007 UR_{65}	29 October 2007	list
(481775) 2008 SX_{7}	21 September 2008	list
(481918) 2009 BE_{77}	30 January 2009	list
(482125) 2010 PX_{2}	15 August 2004	list
(482256) 2011 PC_{1}	30 June 2011	list
(482359) 2011 WQ_{119}	29 July 2006	list
(482464) 2012 JL_{62}	14 May 2012	list
(482566) 2012 WK_{4}	19 November 2012	list
(482610) 2013 AW_{18}	20 February 2009	list
(482645) 2013 AZ_{125}	4 January 2013	list
(482745) 2013 EX_{126}	7 March 2013	list
(482867) 2014 DT_{129}	13 July 2004	list

(482988) 2014 OH_{90}	1 April 2013	list
(483035) 2015 FJ_{332}	7 June 2008	list
(483144) 2015 OB_{50}	27 July 2004	list
(483267) 2015 TG_{178}	28 July 2006	list
(483322) 2016 NN_{23}	29 July 2005	list
(483351) 2016 QU_{84}	18 March 2004	list
(483353) 2016 RQ	10 July 2007	list
(483354) 2016 RQ_{3}	25 July 2008	list
(483593) 2004 MA_{6}	23 June 2004	list
(483603) 2004 RR_{77}	22 July 2004	list
(483878) 2005 YS_{165}	31 December 2005	list
(484084) 2006 QS_{5}	16 August 2006	list
(484402) 2007 XH_{16}	8 December 2007	list
(484724) 2008 XG_{2}	20 March 2004	list
(484825) 2009 GP_{3}	15 April 2009	list
(484861) 2009 KL_{7}	26 May 2009	list
(484974) 2009 TY_{45}	15 October 2009	list
(484976) 2009 UN_{3}	19 October 2009	list
(485056) 2010 CB_{173}	19 July 2007	list
(485116) 2010 JE_{124}	20 April 2010	list
(485623) 2011 UF_{362}	28 August 2005	list
(485889) 2012 FR_{43}	16 October 2010	list
(485997) 2012 LF	29 March 2009	list
(486015) 2012 RN_{40}	10 July 2005	list
(486499) 2013 GB_{99}	31 July 2009	list

(486527) 2013 HO_{7}	2 August 2005	list
(486626) 2013 LU_{21}	10 July 2005	list
(486697) 2013 WW_{104}	7 March 2009	list
(486722) 2014 DS_{2}	11 September 2012	list
(486771) 2014 GP_{49}	22 August 2006	list
(486791) 2014 HU_{146}	29 August 2011	list
(487397) 2014 QA_{327}	3 August 2008	list
(487462) 2014 SJ_{117}	4 August 2008	list
(487749) 2015 RU_{117}	7 September 2011	list
(487939) 2015 TO_{223}	29 July 2006	list
(488221) 2015 YW_{14}	15 July 2004	list
(488278) 2016 TN_{55}	15 October 2012	list
(488317) 2016 UN_{84}	8 August 2004	list
(488334) 2016 VQ_{6}	8 September 2005	list
(488377) 2016 WT_{41}	8 April 2010	list
(488418) 2016 XJ_{4}	9 May 2010	list
(488434) 2016 XE_{22}	16 October 2010	list
(488718) 2004 FZ_{147}	16 March 2004	list
(488725) 2004 PP_{104}	15 August 2004	list
(488743) 2004 RO_{251}	14 September 2004	list
(488827) 2005 NY_{79}	5 July 2005	list
(489232) 2006 PX_{13}	14 August 2006	list
(489486) 2007 GS_{3}	11 April 2007	list
(489507) 2007 NJ_{6}	10 July 2007	list
(489508) 2007 OL_{10}	19 July 2007	list

(490456) 2009 SA_{240}	31 August 2009	list
(490678) 2010 JJ_{176}	9 May 2010	list
(490718) 2010 RL_{82}	11 September 2010	list
(490842) 2010 WG_{62}	4 May 2006	list
(490859) 2011 AL_{43}	20 July 2009	list
(490888) 2011 BD_{53}	16 September 2009	list
(491006) 2011 GG_{58}	14 August 2007	list
(491060) 2011 QN_{70}	30 July 2011	list
(491239) 2011 UO_{201}	18 September 2004	list
(491541) 2012 LV_{15}	18 September 2007	list
(491564) 2012 QU_{40}	11 August 2012	list
(491656) 2012 TY_{257}	21 August 2004	list
(491710) 2012 UK_{130}	28 August 2006	list
(491729) 2012 UO_{174}	10 September 2012	list
(492082) 2013 JE_{15}	18 April 2013	list
(492215) 2013 SY_{52}	8 August 2007	list
(492287) 2013 YG_{47}	9 September 2004	list
(492388) 2014 HM_{181}	4 August 2011	list
(492464) 2014 NL_{18}	4 August 2011	list
(492577) 2014 OU_{184}	14 July 2004	list
(493154) 2014 TH_{68}	9 August 2004	list
(493326) 2014 UC_{209}	10 July 2005	list
(493388) 2014 WN_{139}	10 May 2012	list
(493455) 2014 WH_{394}	27 August 2005	list
(493732) 2015 TP_{177}	23 August 2004	list

(493835) 2015 VT_{133}	1 August 2011	list
(494395) 2016 UB_{54}	21 August 2004	list
(494522) 2016 YU_{12}	16 July 2007	list
(494595) 2017 BR_{102}	28 July 2011	list
(494697) 2004 SW_{55}	24 September 2004	list
(494713) 2005 OU_{2}	29 July 2005	list
(495549) 2014 WV_{169}	14 July 2004	list
(495552) 2014 WS_{200}	15 June 2010	list
(495708) 2016 CJ_{63}	14 August 2012	list
(495798) 2017 FR_{82}	20 May 2006	list
(496124) 2010 EK_{12}	8 March 2010	list
(496331) 2013 OH_{8}	15 July 2004	list
(496519) 2014 US_{218}	4 May 2006	list
(496657) 2016 AY_{183}	15 July 2004	list
(496788) 2017 GG_{5}	18 September 2007	list
(496805) 2017 JE_{2}	15 July 2004	list
(497130) 2004 PC_{67}	14 July 2004	list
(497134) 2004 QZ_{12}	21 August 2004	list
(497136) 2004 QO_{26}	23 August 2004	list
(497168) 2004 SG_{5}	18 August 2004	list
(497282) 2005 QN_{161}	28 August 2005	list
(497611) 2006 PT_{13}	14 August 2006	list
(497616) 2006 QF_{13}	16 August 2006	list
(497618) 2006 QD_{37}	16 August 2006	list
(498023) 2007 FK_{43}	22 February 2007	list

(498580) 2008 OG_{4}	26 July 2008	list
(498595) 2008 RD	2 August 2008	list
(499122) 2009 JE_{11}	14 May 2009	list
(499128) 2009 OV_{22}	20 July 2009	list
(499442) 2010 DG_{78}	20 February 2010	list
(499860) 2011 EE_{74}	7 March 2011	list

== See also ==
- List of minor planet discoverers § Discovering dedicated institutions
- List of near-Earth object observation projects
