= List of minor planets: 409001–410000 =

The following is a partial list of minor planets, running from minor-planet number 409001 through 410000, inclusive. The primary data for this and other partial lists is based on JPL's "Small-Body Orbital Elements" and data available from the Minor Planet Center. Critical list information is also provided by the MPC, unless otherwise specified from Lowell Observatory. A detailed description of the table's columns and additional sources are given on the main page including a complete list of every page in this series, and a statistical break-up on the dynamical classification of minor planets.

Also see the summary list of all named bodies in numerical and alphabetical order, and the corresponding naming citations for the number range of this particular list. New namings may only be added to this list after official publication, as the preannouncement of names is condemned by the Working Group for Small Bodies Nomenclature of the International Astronomical Union.

| Near-Earth obj. | MBA (inner) | MBA (outer) | Centaur |
| Mars-crosser | MBA (middle) | Jupiter trojan | Trans-Neptunian obj. |
| Unclassified |

== 409001–409100 ==
| Designation | | | Discovery | | | Properties | | Ref |
| Permanent | Provisional | Named after | Date | Site | Discoverer(s) | Category | Diam. | Ref |
|---|---|---|---|---|---|---|---|---|
| 409001 | 2002 VG_{116} | — | November 12, 2002 | Socorro | LINEAR | (194) | 2.1 km | MPC · JPL |
| 409002 | 2002 WG_{6} | — | November 24, 2002 | Palomar | NEAT | · | 1.2 km | MPC · JPL |
| 409003 | 2002 XQ_{41} | — | December 6, 2002 | Socorro | LINEAR | (5) | 1.2 km | MPC · JPL |
| 409004 | 2002 XF_{53} | — | December 10, 2002 | Socorro | LINEAR | · | 1.3 km | MPC · JPL |
| 409005 | 2002 XQ_{61} | — | December 10, 2002 | Palomar | NEAT | · | 1.0 km | MPC · JPL |
| 409006 | 2002 XS_{73} | — | December 11, 2002 | Socorro | LINEAR | · | 1.4 km | MPC · JPL |
| 409007 | 2002 XA_{98} | — | December 5, 2002 | Socorro | LINEAR | · | 990 m | MPC · JPL |
| 409008 | 2002 XV_{104} | — | December 5, 2002 | Socorro | LINEAR | · | 1.3 km | MPC · JPL |
| 409009 | 2002 XH_{117} | — | December 7, 2002 | Palomar | NEAT | · | 1.0 km | MPC · JPL |
| 409010 | 2002 XS_{117} | — | December 10, 2002 | Palomar | NEAT | · | 1.4 km | MPC · JPL |
| 409011 | 2003 AZ_{13} | — | January 1, 2003 | Socorro | LINEAR | (5) | 1.4 km | MPC · JPL |
| 409012 | 2003 AV_{33} | — | January 5, 2003 | Kitt Peak | Spacewatch | (5) | 1.2 km | MPC · JPL |
| 409013 | 2003 AA_{79} | — | January 10, 2003 | Kitt Peak | Spacewatch | · | 1.5 km | MPC · JPL |
| 409014 | 2003 AK_{81} | — | January 10, 2003 | Socorro | LINEAR | · | 2.8 km | MPC · JPL |
| 409015 | 2003 AZ_{81} | — | January 13, 2003 | Socorro | LINEAR | (5) | 1.4 km | MPC · JPL |
| 409016 | 2003 AG_{84} | — | January 15, 2003 | Schiaparelli | L. Buzzi, Bellini, F. | · | 1.2 km | MPC · JPL |
| 409017 | 2003 BY | — | January 23, 2003 | Kitt Peak | Spacewatch | · | 1.8 km | MPC · JPL |
| 409018 | 2003 BO_{8} | — | January 26, 2003 | Anderson Mesa | LONEOS | (5) | 1.4 km | MPC · JPL |
| 409019 | 2003 BO_{21} | — | January 27, 2003 | Socorro | LINEAR | H | 450 m | MPC · JPL |
| 409020 | 2003 BJ_{66} | — | January 30, 2003 | Anderson Mesa | LONEOS | · | 1.7 km | MPC · JPL |
| 409021 | 2003 CL_{1} | — | February 1, 2003 | Haleakala | NEAT | · | 1.3 km | MPC · JPL |
| 409022 | 2003 EX_{6} | — | March 6, 2003 | Anderson Mesa | LONEOS | H | 460 m | MPC · JPL |
| 409023 | 2003 EJ_{46} | — | March 7, 2003 | Anderson Mesa | LONEOS | · | 810 m | MPC · JPL |
| 409024 | 2003 ED_{57} | — | March 9, 2003 | Anderson Mesa | LONEOS | · | 1.9 km | MPC · JPL |
| 409025 | 2003 EJ_{62} | — | March 8, 2003 | Anderson Mesa | LONEOS | JUN | 1.5 km | MPC · JPL |
| 409026 | 2003 FL_{23} | — | March 23, 2003 | Kitt Peak | Spacewatch | · | 690 m | MPC · JPL |
| 409027 | 2003 GM | — | April 1, 2003 | Socorro | LINEAR | H | 530 m | MPC · JPL |
| 409028 | 2003 GC_{19} | — | April 4, 2003 | Kitt Peak | Spacewatch | · | 1.9 km | MPC · JPL |
| 409029 | 2003 GX_{25} | — | April 4, 2003 | Kitt Peak | Spacewatch | · | 610 m | MPC · JPL |
| 409030 | 2003 GP_{28} | — | April 7, 2003 | Kitt Peak | Spacewatch | · | 2.0 km | MPC · JPL |
| 409031 | 2003 GY_{33} | — | February 28, 2003 | Socorro | LINEAR | · | 2.1 km | MPC · JPL |
| 409032 | 2003 GX_{55} | — | April 5, 2003 | Kitt Peak | Spacewatch | · | 910 m | MPC · JPL |
| 409033 | 2003 JO_{18} | — | May 10, 2003 | Kitt Peak | Spacewatch | · | 2.0 km | MPC · JPL |
| 409034 | 2003 MA_{2} | — | June 23, 2003 | Anderson Mesa | LONEOS | · | 1.8 km | MPC · JPL |
| 409035 | 2003 NG_{2} | — | May 27, 2003 | Kitt Peak | Spacewatch | · | 1.4 km | MPC · JPL |
| 409036 | 2003 NV_{12} | — | July 1, 2003 | Haleakala | NEAT | · | 1.2 km | MPC · JPL |
| 409037 | 2003 QB_{23} | — | August 20, 2003 | Palomar | NEAT | · | 2.0 km | MPC · JPL |
| 409038 | 2003 QK_{35} | — | August 4, 2003 | Kitt Peak | Spacewatch | · | 2.4 km | MPC · JPL |
| 409039 | 2003 QM_{117} | — | August 22, 2003 | Palomar | NEAT | · | 5.1 km | MPC · JPL |
| 409040 | 2003 QZ_{119} | — | August 28, 2003 | Palomar | NEAT | · | 3.0 km | MPC · JPL |
| 409041 | 2003 RL_{13} | — | September 15, 2003 | Palomar | NEAT | · | 2.4 km | MPC · JPL |
| 409042 | 2003 RO_{25} | — | September 15, 2003 | Palomar | NEAT | · | 2.5 km | MPC · JPL |
| 409043 | 2003 RS_{25} | — | September 15, 2003 | Palomar | NEAT | · | 3.8 km | MPC · JPL |
| 409044 | 2003 SX_{29} | — | September 18, 2003 | Palomar | NEAT | TIR | 2.2 km | MPC · JPL |
| 409045 | 2003 SM_{32} | — | September 18, 2003 | Socorro | LINEAR | · | 3.8 km | MPC · JPL |
| 409046 | 2003 SW_{39} | — | September 16, 2003 | Palomar | NEAT | · | 6.3 km | MPC · JPL |
| 409047 | 2003 SK_{49} | — | September 18, 2003 | Palomar | NEAT | · | 2.9 km | MPC · JPL |
| 409048 | 2003 SD_{68} | — | September 17, 2003 | Kitt Peak | Spacewatch | · | 1.1 km | MPC · JPL |
| 409049 | 2003 SP_{69} | — | September 17, 2003 | Kitt Peak | Spacewatch | · | 2.1 km | MPC · JPL |
| 409050 | 2003 SH_{79} | — | September 19, 2003 | Kitt Peak | Spacewatch | · | 3.1 km | MPC · JPL |
| 409051 | 2003 SC_{83} | — | September 18, 2003 | Kitt Peak | Spacewatch | · | 900 m | MPC · JPL |
| 409052 | 2003 SX_{90} | — | September 18, 2003 | Socorro | LINEAR | NYS | 1.2 km | MPC · JPL |
| 409053 | 2003 SA_{99} | — | September 19, 2003 | Kitt Peak | Spacewatch | · | 3.7 km | MPC · JPL |
| 409054 | 2003 SE_{101} | — | September 20, 2003 | Palomar | NEAT | · | 3.3 km | MPC · JPL |
| 409055 | 2003 SR_{101} | — | September 20, 2003 | Palomar | NEAT | · | 3.9 km | MPC · JPL |
| 409056 | 2003 SZ_{116} | — | September 16, 2003 | Palomar | NEAT | · | 4.2 km | MPC · JPL |
| 409057 | 2003 SV_{122} | — | September 18, 2003 | Palomar | NEAT | EOS | 1.8 km | MPC · JPL |
| 409058 | 2003 SU_{150} | — | September 17, 2003 | Socorro | LINEAR | · | 2.6 km | MPC · JPL |
| 409059 | 2003 SE_{161} | — | September 17, 2003 | Palomar | NEAT | · | 4.2 km | MPC · JPL |
| 409060 | 2003 SC_{175} | — | September 18, 2003 | Kitt Peak | Spacewatch | · | 1.8 km | MPC · JPL |
| 409061 | 2003 SK_{175} | — | September 18, 2003 | Kitt Peak | Spacewatch | · | 3.0 km | MPC · JPL |
| 409062 | 2003 SZ_{183} | — | September 21, 2003 | Kitt Peak | Spacewatch | · | 2.9 km | MPC · JPL |
| 409063 | 2003 SF_{184} | — | September 21, 2003 | Kitt Peak | Spacewatch | · | 2.4 km | MPC · JPL |
| 409064 | 2003 SA_{185} | — | September 21, 2003 | Kitt Peak | Spacewatch | THM | 2.0 km | MPC · JPL |
| 409065 | 2003 SJ_{203} | — | September 16, 2003 | Kitt Peak | Spacewatch | · | 2.9 km | MPC · JPL |
| 409066 | 2003 SU_{207} | — | September 26, 2003 | Socorro | LINEAR | · | 4.2 km | MPC · JPL |
| 409067 | 2003 SO_{222} | — | September 28, 2003 | Kitt Peak | Spacewatch | · | 1.3 km | MPC · JPL |
| 409068 | 2003 SY_{226} | — | September 16, 2003 | Kitt Peak | Spacewatch | · | 1.0 km | MPC · JPL |
| 409069 | 2003 ST_{237} | — | September 26, 2003 | Socorro | LINEAR | NYS | 1.1 km | MPC · JPL |
| 409070 | 2003 SL_{243} | — | September 28, 2003 | Kitt Peak | Spacewatch | EOS | 2.4 km | MPC · JPL |
| 409071 | 2003 SN_{246} | — | September 26, 2003 | Socorro | LINEAR | · | 2.6 km | MPC · JPL |
| 409072 | 2003 SL_{267} | — | September 29, 2003 | Kitt Peak | Spacewatch | VER | 2.3 km | MPC · JPL |
| 409073 | 2003 SU_{277} | — | September 30, 2003 | Socorro | LINEAR | LIX | 4.2 km | MPC · JPL |
| 409074 | 2003 SA_{280} | — | September 18, 2003 | Palomar | NEAT | LIX | 3.5 km | MPC · JPL |
| 409075 | 2003 SE_{282} | — | September 19, 2003 | Palomar | NEAT | · | 3.1 km | MPC · JPL |
| 409076 | 2003 SE_{292} | — | September 30, 2003 | Socorro | LINEAR | H | 610 m | MPC · JPL |
| 409077 | 2003 SS_{295} | — | September 29, 2003 | Anderson Mesa | LONEOS | · | 1.3 km | MPC · JPL |
| 409078 | 2003 SR_{296} | — | September 29, 2003 | Anderson Mesa | LONEOS | TIR | 3.1 km | MPC · JPL |
| 409079 | 2003 SA_{315} | — | September 16, 2003 | Palomar | NEAT | H | 720 m | MPC · JPL |
| 409080 | 2003 SM_{324} | — | September 17, 2003 | Kitt Peak | Spacewatch | · | 2.5 km | MPC · JPL |
| 409081 | 2003 SB_{326} | — | September 18, 2003 | Palomar | NEAT | · | 3.9 km | MPC · JPL |
| 409082 | 2003 SN_{327} | — | September 19, 2003 | Kitt Peak | Spacewatch | THB | 2.0 km | MPC · JPL |
| 409083 | 2003 SX_{327} | — | September 19, 2003 | Kitt Peak | Spacewatch | V | 740 m | MPC · JPL |
| 409084 | 2003 SQ_{328} | — | September 21, 2003 | Kitt Peak | Spacewatch | · | 2.5 km | MPC · JPL |
| 409085 | 2003 SE_{329} | — | September 22, 2003 | Anderson Mesa | LONEOS | EOS | 2.0 km | MPC · JPL |
| 409086 | 2003 SY_{329} | — | September 26, 2003 | Apache Point | SDSS | · | 1.1 km | MPC · JPL |
| 409087 | 2003 SK_{330} | — | September 26, 2003 | Apache Point | SDSS | MAS | 540 m | MPC · JPL |
| 409088 | 2003 SO_{330} | — | September 26, 2003 | Apache Point | SDSS | · | 2.8 km | MPC · JPL |
| 409089 | 2003 SY_{335} | — | September 26, 2003 | Apache Point | SDSS | · | 3.7 km | MPC · JPL |
| 409090 | 2003 ST_{338} | — | September 26, 2003 | Apache Point | SDSS | · | 2.9 km | MPC · JPL |
| 409091 | 2003 SG_{340} | — | September 28, 2003 | Apache Point | SDSS | · | 3.1 km | MPC · JPL |
| 409092 | 2003 SG_{345} | — | September 18, 2003 | Kitt Peak | Spacewatch | EOS | 1.8 km | MPC · JPL |
| 409093 | 2003 SK_{349} | — | November 15, 1998 | Kitt Peak | Spacewatch | · | 2.4 km | MPC · JPL |
| 409094 | 2003 SE_{358} | — | September 20, 2003 | Kitt Peak | Spacewatch | · | 3.4 km | MPC · JPL |
| 409095 | 2003 SX_{359} | — | September 21, 2003 | Kitt Peak | Spacewatch | · | 2.4 km | MPC · JPL |
| 409096 | 2003 SK_{364} | — | September 20, 2003 | Kitt Peak | Spacewatch | · | 2.1 km | MPC · JPL |
| 409097 | 2003 ST_{364} | — | September 26, 2003 | Apache Point | SDSS | · | 1.0 km | MPC · JPL |
| 409098 | 2003 SS_{365} | — | September 26, 2003 | Apache Point | SDSS | · | 2.3 km | MPC · JPL |
| 409099 | 2003 SP_{368} | — | September 26, 2003 | Apache Point | SDSS | · | 910 m | MPC · JPL |
| 409100 | 2003 SO_{387} | — | September 26, 2003 | Apache Point | SDSS | · | 3.0 km | MPC · JPL |

== 409101–409200 ==
back to top

| Designation | | | Discovery | | | Properties | | Ref |
| Permanent | Provisional | Named after | Date | Site | Discoverer(s) | Category | Diam. | Ref |
|---|---|---|---|---|---|---|---|---|
| 409101 | 2003 SQ_{392} | — | September 26, 2003 | Apache Point | SDSS | · | 2.6 km | MPC · JPL |
| 409102 | 2003 SU_{394} | — | September 26, 2003 | Apache Point | SDSS | · | 3.2 km | MPC · JPL |
| 409103 | 2003 SF_{410} | — | September 28, 2003 | Kitt Peak | Spacewatch | · | 1.8 km | MPC · JPL |
| 409104 | 2003 SX_{410} | — | September 28, 2003 | Apache Point | SDSS | · | 750 m | MPC · JPL |
| 409105 | 2003 SL_{432} | — | September 18, 2003 | Kitt Peak | Spacewatch | · | 2.2 km | MPC · JPL |
| 409106 | 2003 SM_{432} | — | September 18, 2003 | Kitt Peak | Spacewatch | · | 3.2 km | MPC · JPL |
| 409107 | 2003 ST_{432} | — | September 20, 2003 | Kitt Peak | Spacewatch | · | 2.7 km | MPC · JPL |
| 409108 | 2003 SD_{433} | — | September 22, 2003 | Kitt Peak | Spacewatch | MAS | 760 m | MPC · JPL |
| 409109 | 2003 TV_{8} | — | October 3, 2003 | Kitt Peak | Spacewatch | · | 2.5 km | MPC · JPL |
| 409110 | 2003 TG_{19} | — | October 15, 2003 | Palomar | NEAT | · | 3.8 km | MPC · JPL |
| 409111 | 2003 TW_{27} | — | September 21, 2003 | Campo Imperatore | CINEOS | EOS | 1.8 km | MPC · JPL |
| 409112 | 2003 TO_{29} | — | October 1, 2003 | Kitt Peak | Spacewatch | · | 3.1 km | MPC · JPL |
| 409113 | 2003 TV_{34} | — | October 1, 2003 | Kitt Peak | Spacewatch | · | 3.1 km | MPC · JPL |
| 409114 | 2003 TP_{44} | — | October 3, 2003 | Kitt Peak | Spacewatch | · | 3.1 km | MPC · JPL |
| 409115 | 2003 TR_{46} | — | October 3, 2003 | Kitt Peak | Spacewatch | · | 4.3 km | MPC · JPL |
| 409116 | 2003 TF_{48} | — | October 3, 2003 | Kitt Peak | Spacewatch | · | 2.4 km | MPC · JPL |
| 409117 | 2003 TD_{56} | — | October 5, 2003 | Kitt Peak | Spacewatch | · | 1.2 km | MPC · JPL |
| 409118 | 2003 TP_{59} | — | September 18, 2003 | Kitt Peak | Spacewatch | · | 3.1 km | MPC · JPL |
| 409119 | 2003 UP | — | October 16, 2003 | Socorro | LINEAR | EUP | 5.9 km | MPC · JPL |
| 409120 | 2003 UR_{2} | — | October 16, 2003 | Kitt Peak | Spacewatch | · | 3.6 km | MPC · JPL |
| 409121 | 2003 UW_{2} | — | October 16, 2003 | Kitt Peak | Spacewatch | · | 4.7 km | MPC · JPL |
| 409122 | 2003 UJ_{6} | — | October 18, 2003 | Palomar | NEAT | · | 4.6 km | MPC · JPL |
| 409123 | 2003 UF_{16} | — | October 16, 2003 | Anderson Mesa | LONEOS | LIX | 5.5 km | MPC · JPL |
| 409124 | 2003 UB_{19} | — | October 20, 2003 | Kitt Peak | Spacewatch | · | 1.2 km | MPC · JPL |
| 409125 | 2003 UD_{19} | — | October 20, 2003 | Palomar | NEAT | TIR | 3.2 km | MPC · JPL |
| 409126 | 2003 UP_{21} | — | October 19, 2003 | Anderson Mesa | LONEOS | · | 5.5 km | MPC · JPL |
| 409127 | 2003 UF_{24} | — | October 20, 2003 | Kitt Peak | Spacewatch | H | 620 m | MPC · JPL |
| 409128 | 2003 US_{30} | — | October 16, 2003 | Palomar | NEAT | · | 3.1 km | MPC · JPL |
| 409129 | 2003 UJ_{32} | — | September 22, 2003 | Kitt Peak | Spacewatch | · | 2.6 km | MPC · JPL |
| 409130 | 2003 UV_{32} | — | September 28, 2003 | Kitt Peak | Spacewatch | EOS | 2.2 km | MPC · JPL |
| 409131 | 2003 UE_{35} | — | October 16, 2003 | Palomar | NEAT | · | 3.9 km | MPC · JPL |
| 409132 | 2003 UY_{37} | — | October 17, 2003 | Kitt Peak | Spacewatch | · | 3.9 km | MPC · JPL |
| 409133 | 2003 UL_{49} | — | October 16, 2003 | Palomar | NEAT | · | 3.8 km | MPC · JPL |
| 409134 | 2003 UH_{50} | — | October 17, 2003 | Nogales | Tenagra II | LIX | 4.6 km | MPC · JPL |
| 409135 | 2003 UK_{52} | — | October 18, 2003 | Palomar | NEAT | · | 6.2 km | MPC · JPL |
| 409136 | 2003 UM_{54} | — | October 18, 2003 | Palomar | NEAT | · | 3.4 km | MPC · JPL |
| 409137 | 2003 UP_{55} | — | October 18, 2003 | Palomar | NEAT | · | 6.6 km | MPC · JPL |
| 409138 | 2003 UD_{62} | — | October 16, 2003 | Anderson Mesa | LONEOS | · | 2.8 km | MPC · JPL |
| 409139 | 2003 UO_{63} | — | October 16, 2003 | Palomar | NEAT | · | 1.4 km | MPC · JPL |
| 409140 | 2003 UJ_{69} | — | September 16, 2003 | Kitt Peak | Spacewatch | EOS | 1.9 km | MPC · JPL |
| 409141 | 2003 UV_{74} | — | October 17, 2003 | Anderson Mesa | LONEOS | · | 3.8 km | MPC · JPL |
| 409142 | 2003 UN_{75} | — | October 17, 2003 | Anderson Mesa | LONEOS | · | 2.7 km | MPC · JPL |
| 409143 | 2003 UU_{76} | — | October 17, 2003 | Anderson Mesa | LONEOS | H | 730 m | MPC · JPL |
| 409144 | 2003 UB_{85} | — | October 18, 2003 | Kitt Peak | Spacewatch | VER | 3.1 km | MPC · JPL |
| 409145 | 2003 UM_{94} | — | October 18, 2003 | Kitt Peak | Spacewatch | · | 2.8 km | MPC · JPL |
| 409146 | 2003 UT_{94} | — | October 18, 2003 | Kitt Peak | Spacewatch | V | 760 m | MPC · JPL |
| 409147 | 2003 UQ_{104} | — | October 18, 2003 | Kitt Peak | Spacewatch | · | 3.7 km | MPC · JPL |
| 409148 | 2003 UA_{113} | — | October 20, 2003 | Socorro | LINEAR | · | 1.2 km | MPC · JPL |
| 409149 | 2003 UV_{115} | — | October 20, 2003 | Palomar | NEAT | · | 4.9 km | MPC · JPL |
| 409150 | 2003 UJ_{120} | — | September 29, 2003 | Kitt Peak | Spacewatch | · | 3.4 km | MPC · JPL |
| 409151 | 2003 UU_{120} | — | October 18, 2003 | Palomar | NEAT | EUP | 4.4 km | MPC · JPL |
| 409152 | 2003 UA_{127} | — | October 21, 2003 | Kitt Peak | Spacewatch | · | 3.0 km | MPC · JPL |
| 409153 | 2003 UW_{128} | — | October 21, 2003 | Kitt Peak | Spacewatch | · | 1.2 km | MPC · JPL |
| 409154 | 2003 UD_{131} | — | October 19, 2003 | Palomar | NEAT | · | 2.2 km | MPC · JPL |
| 409155 | 2003 UX_{135} | — | October 21, 2003 | Palomar | NEAT | · | 3.8 km | MPC · JPL |
| 409156 | 2003 UW_{156} | — | October 20, 2003 | Socorro | LINEAR | · | 1.1 km | MPC · JPL |
| 409157 | 2003 UB_{161} | — | October 21, 2003 | Kitt Peak | Spacewatch | EOS | 2.1 km | MPC · JPL |
| 409158 | 2003 UL_{172} | — | October 20, 2003 | Socorro | LINEAR | · | 3.4 km | MPC · JPL |
| 409159 | 2003 UP_{174} | — | October 21, 2003 | Kitt Peak | Spacewatch | · | 4.4 km | MPC · JPL |
| 409160 | 2003 UU_{182} | — | October 21, 2003 | Palomar | NEAT | THM | 2.1 km | MPC · JPL |
| 409161 | 2003 UA_{191} | — | October 23, 2003 | Anderson Mesa | LONEOS | · | 3.5 km | MPC · JPL |
| 409162 | 2003 UF_{201} | — | September 28, 2003 | Kitt Peak | Spacewatch | · | 1.2 km | MPC · JPL |
| 409163 | 2003 US_{203} | — | October 21, 2003 | Kitt Peak | Spacewatch | MAS | 690 m | MPC · JPL |
| 409164 | 2003 UU_{204} | — | October 22, 2003 | Socorro | LINEAR | · | 970 m | MPC · JPL |
| 409165 | 2003 UU_{207} | — | October 22, 2003 | Kitt Peak | Spacewatch | · | 1.1 km | MPC · JPL |
| 409166 | 2003 UV_{211} | — | October 23, 2003 | Kitt Peak | Spacewatch | ERI | 1.4 km | MPC · JPL |
| 409167 | 2003 UJ_{214} | — | October 24, 2003 | Socorro | LINEAR | · | 3.1 km | MPC · JPL |
| 409168 | 2003 UA_{215} | — | September 27, 2003 | Kitt Peak | Spacewatch | THM | 2.5 km | MPC · JPL |
| 409169 | 2003 UK_{216} | — | October 21, 2003 | Socorro | LINEAR | · | 1.4 km | MPC · JPL |
| 409170 | 2003 UC_{229} | — | October 23, 2003 | Anderson Mesa | LONEOS | · | 5.0 km | MPC · JPL |
| 409171 | 2003 UF_{229} | — | October 23, 2003 | Anderson Mesa | LONEOS | · | 1.2 km | MPC · JPL |
| 409172 | 2003 UB_{235} | — | September 22, 2003 | Kitt Peak | Spacewatch | · | 920 m | MPC · JPL |
| 409173 | 2003 UG_{239} | — | October 24, 2003 | Socorro | LINEAR | · | 3.2 km | MPC · JPL |
| 409174 | 2003 UX_{240} | — | October 24, 2003 | Kitt Peak | Spacewatch | LIX | 3.9 km | MPC · JPL |
| 409175 | 2003 UC_{245} | — | October 24, 2003 | Kitt Peak | Spacewatch | · | 3.8 km | MPC · JPL |
| 409176 | 2003 UM_{250} | — | October 25, 2003 | Socorro | LINEAR | · | 4.3 km | MPC · JPL |
| 409177 | 2003 UC_{254} | — | October 24, 2003 | Kitt Peak | Spacewatch | · | 4.2 km | MPC · JPL |
| 409178 | 2003 UQ_{282} | — | October 29, 2003 | Anderson Mesa | LONEOS | · | 1.6 km | MPC · JPL |
| 409179 | 2003 UN_{296} | — | October 16, 2003 | Kitt Peak | Spacewatch | MAS | 620 m | MPC · JPL |
| 409180 | 2003 UK_{297} | — | October 16, 2003 | Kitt Peak | Spacewatch | · | 1.5 km | MPC · JPL |
| 409181 | 2003 UO_{297} | — | October 16, 2003 | Kitt Peak | Spacewatch | · | 1.3 km | MPC · JPL |
| 409182 | 2003 UZ_{298} | — | September 27, 2003 | Kitt Peak | Spacewatch | · | 2.4 km | MPC · JPL |
| 409183 | 2003 UF_{299} | — | September 27, 2003 | Kitt Peak | Spacewatch | HYG | 2.9 km | MPC · JPL |
| 409184 | 2003 UN_{299} | — | October 16, 2003 | Kitt Peak | Spacewatch | · | 2.5 km | MPC · JPL |
| 409185 | 2003 UY_{308} | — | October 19, 2003 | Kitt Peak | Spacewatch | MAS | 760 m | MPC · JPL |
| 409186 | 2003 UR_{314} | — | October 27, 2003 | Kitt Peak | Spacewatch | MAS | 550 m | MPC · JPL |
| 409187 | 2003 UT_{315} | — | October 20, 2003 | Socorro | LINEAR | · | 1.0 km | MPC · JPL |
| 409188 | 2003 UH_{316} | — | October 23, 2003 | Kitt Peak | Spacewatch | · | 2.7 km | MPC · JPL |
| 409189 | 2003 UY_{316} | — | October 18, 2003 | Apache Point | SDSS | · | 1.1 km | MPC · JPL |
| 409190 | 2003 UM_{317} | — | October 19, 2003 | Apache Point | SDSS | · | 3.4 km | MPC · JPL |
| 409191 | 2003 UC_{327} | — | September 18, 2003 | Kitt Peak | Spacewatch | · | 2.7 km | MPC · JPL |
| 409192 | 2003 UY_{327} | — | October 17, 2003 | Apache Point | SDSS | V | 650 m | MPC · JPL |
| 409193 | 2003 UD_{329} | — | October 17, 2003 | Apache Point | SDSS | · | 4.4 km | MPC · JPL |
| 409194 | 2003 US_{340} | — | October 18, 2003 | Kitt Peak | Spacewatch | EOS · | 3.3 km | MPC · JPL |
| 409195 | 2003 UQ_{344} | — | October 19, 2003 | Apache Point | SDSS | · | 2.4 km | MPC · JPL |
| 409196 | 2003 UM_{373} | — | October 22, 2003 | Apache Point | SDSS | EOS | 1.7 km | MPC · JPL |
| 409197 | 2003 UB_{377} | — | October 22, 2003 | Apache Point | SDSS | · | 1.1 km | MPC · JPL |
| 409198 | 2003 US_{399} | — | October 22, 2003 | Kitt Peak | Spacewatch | H | 600 m | MPC · JPL |
| 409199 | 2003 UG_{416} | — | October 21, 2003 | Palomar | NEAT | · | 4.8 km | MPC · JPL |
| 409200 | 2003 VX_{4} | — | November 15, 2003 | Kitt Peak | Spacewatch | · | 1.1 km | MPC · JPL |

== 409201–409300 ==
back to top

| Designation | | | Discovery | | | Properties | | Ref |
| Permanent | Provisional | Named after | Date | Site | Discoverer(s) | Category | Diam. | Ref |
|---|---|---|---|---|---|---|---|---|
| 409201 | 2003 WS | — | November 16, 2003 | Catalina | CSS | NYS | 910 m | MPC · JPL |
| 409202 | 2003 WY_{2} | — | November 18, 2003 | Kitt Peak | Spacewatch | · | 3.9 km | MPC · JPL |
| 409203 | 2003 WU_{16} | — | November 18, 2003 | Palomar | NEAT | · | 1.1 km | MPC · JPL |
| 409204 | 2003 WX_{25} | — | November 21, 2003 | Socorro | LINEAR | T_{j} (2.9) · AMO | 630 m | MPC · JPL |
| 409205 | 2003 WL_{27} | — | November 16, 2003 | Kitt Peak | Spacewatch | · | 1.4 km | MPC · JPL |
| 409206 | 2003 WF_{28} | — | November 16, 2003 | Kitt Peak | Spacewatch | MAS | 730 m | MPC · JPL |
| 409207 | 2003 WP_{41} | — | November 19, 2003 | Kitt Peak | Spacewatch | NYS | 1.3 km | MPC · JPL |
| 409208 | 2003 WB_{44} | — | November 19, 2003 | Palomar | NEAT | V | 670 m | MPC · JPL |
| 409209 | 2003 WN_{44} | — | November 19, 2003 | Palomar | NEAT | · | 3.8 km | MPC · JPL |
| 409210 | 2003 WO_{50} | — | November 19, 2003 | Socorro | LINEAR | · | 5.5 km | MPC · JPL |
| 409211 | 2003 WN_{57} | — | November 18, 2003 | Kitt Peak | Spacewatch | MAS | 800 m | MPC · JPL |
| 409212 | 2003 WL_{58} | — | October 28, 2003 | Socorro | LINEAR | · | 1.3 km | MPC · JPL |
| 409213 | 2003 WJ_{71} | — | November 20, 2003 | Socorro | LINEAR | · | 4.4 km | MPC · JPL |
| 409214 | 2003 WV_{87} | — | November 21, 2003 | Socorro | LINEAR | · | 1.3 km | MPC · JPL |
| 409215 | 2003 WA_{91} | — | November 18, 2003 | Palomar | NEAT | NYS | 940 m | MPC · JPL |
| 409216 | 2003 WF_{93} | — | November 19, 2003 | Anderson Mesa | LONEOS | · | 4.0 km | MPC · JPL |
| 409217 | 2003 WH_{129} | — | October 20, 2003 | Kitt Peak | Spacewatch | · | 1.0 km | MPC · JPL |
| 409218 | 2003 WU_{146} | — | November 23, 2003 | Socorro | LINEAR | TIR | 3.5 km | MPC · JPL |
| 409219 | 2003 WB_{147} | — | November 23, 2003 | Kitt Peak | Spacewatch | · | 1.2 km | MPC · JPL |
| 409220 | 2003 WQ_{169} | — | November 19, 2003 | Catalina | CSS | · | 5.1 km | MPC · JPL |
| 409221 | 2003 XN_{27} | — | November 18, 2003 | Kitt Peak | Spacewatch | THM | 2.6 km | MPC · JPL |
| 409222 | 2003 XH_{32} | — | November 19, 2003 | Kitt Peak | Spacewatch | · | 1.3 km | MPC · JPL |
| 409223 | 2003 YT | — | December 17, 2003 | Socorro | LINEAR | H | 650 m | MPC · JPL |
| 409224 | 2003 YK_{34} | — | December 17, 2003 | Kitt Peak | Spacewatch | · | 1.9 km | MPC · JPL |
| 409225 | 2003 YH_{38} | — | December 19, 2003 | Kitt Peak | Spacewatch | V | 700 m | MPC · JPL |
| 409226 | 2003 YR_{82} | — | December 18, 2003 | Kitt Peak | Spacewatch | NYS | 1.1 km | MPC · JPL |
| 409227 | 2003 YT_{93} | — | December 21, 2003 | Socorro | LINEAR | · | 1.1 km | MPC · JPL |
| 409228 | 2003 YU_{97} | — | December 19, 2003 | Socorro | LINEAR | · | 1.9 km | MPC · JPL |
| 409229 | 2003 YM_{107} | — | December 22, 2003 | Socorro | LINEAR | T_{j} (2.95) | 3.2 km | MPC · JPL |
| 409230 | 2003 YZ_{157} | — | November 26, 2003 | Socorro | LINEAR | V | 830 m | MPC · JPL |
| 409231 | 2003 YN_{166} | — | December 17, 2003 | Kitt Peak | Spacewatch | · | 1.3 km | MPC · JPL |
| 409232 | 2004 AB_{26} | — | January 13, 2004 | Anderson Mesa | LONEOS | · | 1.6 km | MPC · JPL |
| 409233 | 2004 BG_{61} | — | January 21, 2004 | Socorro | LINEAR | · | 1.1 km | MPC · JPL |
| 409234 | 2004 BW_{147} | — | January 16, 2004 | Palomar | NEAT | · | 920 m | MPC · JPL |
| 409235 | 2004 BH_{148} | — | January 16, 2004 | Palomar | NEAT | · | 1.7 km | MPC · JPL |
| 409236 | 2004 CL_{60} | — | February 11, 2004 | Palomar | NEAT | · | 1.3 km | MPC · JPL |
| 409237 | 2004 CS_{66} | — | February 15, 2004 | Socorro | LINEAR | · | 1.5 km | MPC · JPL |
| 409238 | 2004 CZ_{103} | — | February 13, 2004 | Palomar | NEAT | · | 1.9 km | MPC · JPL |
| 409239 | 2004 DL_{21} | — | February 17, 2004 | Catalina | CSS | · | 1.4 km | MPC · JPL |
| 409240 | 2004 DF_{64} | — | February 29, 2004 | Kitt Peak | Spacewatch | · | 1.8 km | MPC · JPL |
| 409241 | 2004 EP_{6} | — | March 12, 2004 | Palomar | NEAT | · | 1.6 km | MPC · JPL |
| 409242 | 2004 EC_{23} | — | March 15, 2004 | Catalina | CSS | · | 1.6 km | MPC · JPL |
| 409243 | 2004 EJ_{38} | — | March 14, 2004 | Kitt Peak | Spacewatch | · | 1.9 km | MPC · JPL |
| 409244 | 2004 EQ_{42} | — | March 15, 2004 | Catalina | CSS | · | 1.7 km | MPC · JPL |
| 409245 | 2004 ET_{76} | — | March 15, 2004 | Kitt Peak | Spacewatch | · | 1.3 km | MPC · JPL |
| 409246 | 2004 EG_{77} | — | March 15, 2004 | Socorro | LINEAR | · | 1.4 km | MPC · JPL |
| 409247 | 2004 EM_{86} | — | March 15, 2004 | Catalina | CSS | ADE | 2.1 km | MPC · JPL |
| 409248 | 2004 FX_{37} | — | March 17, 2004 | Kitt Peak | Spacewatch | · | 1.4 km | MPC · JPL |
| 409249 | 2004 FS_{57} | — | March 17, 2004 | Kitt Peak | Spacewatch | · | 1.0 km | MPC · JPL |
| 409250 | 2004 FO_{63} | — | March 19, 2004 | Socorro | LINEAR | · | 1.8 km | MPC · JPL |
| 409251 | 2004 FX_{66} | — | March 20, 2004 | Socorro | LINEAR | · | 1.2 km | MPC · JPL |
| 409252 | 2004 FK_{70} | — | March 16, 2004 | Valmeca | Valmeca | · | 1.4 km | MPC · JPL |
| 409253 | 2004 FO_{134} | — | March 26, 2004 | Socorro | LINEAR | · | 1.9 km | MPC · JPL |
| 409254 | 2004 GQ_{14} | — | April 13, 2004 | Palomar | NEAT | · | 1.6 km | MPC · JPL |
| 409255 | 2004 GX_{75} | — | March 30, 2004 | Siding Spring | SSS | · | 2.8 km | MPC · JPL |
| 409256 | 2004 HO_{1} | — | April 19, 2004 | Socorro | LINEAR | AMO +1km | 1.9 km | MPC · JPL |
| 409257 | 2004 HN_{54} | — | April 21, 2004 | Catalina | CSS | · | 2.4 km | MPC · JPL |
| 409258 | 2004 HE_{59} | — | April 24, 2004 | Siding Spring | SSS | EUN | 1.7 km | MPC · JPL |
| 409259 | 2004 JD_{3} | — | May 9, 2004 | Palomar | NEAT | EUN | 1.7 km | MPC · JPL |
| 409260 | 2004 LO_{27} | — | June 13, 2004 | Kitt Peak | Spacewatch | · | 1.7 km | MPC · JPL |
| 409261 | 2004 LC_{30} | — | June 14, 2004 | Kitt Peak | Spacewatch | · | 670 m | MPC · JPL |
| 409262 | 2004 PX_{81} | — | August 10, 2004 | Socorro | LINEAR | · | 2.3 km | MPC · JPL |
| 409263 | 2004 PN_{87} | — | August 11, 2004 | Socorro | LINEAR | · | 710 m | MPC · JPL |
| 409264 | 2004 PS_{99} | — | August 11, 2004 | Socorro | LINEAR | · | 820 m | MPC · JPL |
| 409265 | 2004 PP_{105} | — | August 13, 2004 | Palomar | NEAT | · | 2.2 km | MPC · JPL |
| 409266 | 2004 RK_{9} | — | September 7, 2004 | Socorro | LINEAR | AMO | 200 m | MPC · JPL |
| 409267 | 2004 RL_{17} | — | September 7, 2004 | Socorro | LINEAR | · | 720 m | MPC · JPL |
| 409268 | 2004 RW_{18} | — | September 7, 2004 | Kitt Peak | Spacewatch | · | 600 m | MPC · JPL |
| 409269 | 2004 RY_{19} | — | September 7, 2004 | Socorro | LINEAR | · | 770 m | MPC · JPL |
| 409270 | 2004 RP_{23} | — | September 7, 2004 | Uccle | T. Pauwels | · | 820 m | MPC · JPL |
| 409271 | 2004 RS_{36} | — | September 7, 2004 | Socorro | LINEAR | · | 2.4 km | MPC · JPL |
| 409272 | 2004 RV_{52} | — | September 8, 2004 | Socorro | LINEAR | · | 810 m | MPC · JPL |
| 409273 | 2004 RH_{96} | — | August 9, 2004 | Campo Imperatore | CINEOS | · | 640 m | MPC · JPL |
| 409274 | 2004 RW_{99} | — | September 8, 2004 | Socorro | LINEAR | · | 2.2 km | MPC · JPL |
| 409275 | 2004 RA_{102} | — | September 8, 2004 | Socorro | LINEAR | · | 1.7 km | MPC · JPL |
| 409276 | 2004 RU_{153} | — | September 10, 2004 | Socorro | LINEAR | · | 630 m | MPC · JPL |
| 409277 | 2004 RX_{155} | — | September 10, 2004 | Socorro | LINEAR | · | 2.1 km | MPC · JPL |
| 409278 | 2004 RF_{159} | — | September 10, 2004 | Socorro | LINEAR | · | 620 m | MPC · JPL |
| 409279 | 2004 RK_{167} | — | September 7, 2004 | Socorro | LINEAR | · | 2.4 km | MPC · JPL |
| 409280 | 2004 RV_{201} | — | September 11, 2004 | Socorro | LINEAR | · | 2.0 km | MPC · JPL |
| 409281 | 2004 RW_{202} | — | September 11, 2004 | Kitt Peak | Spacewatch | · | 530 m | MPC · JPL |
| 409282 | 2004 RY_{211} | — | September 11, 2004 | Socorro | LINEAR | · | 1.9 km | MPC · JPL |
| 409283 | 2004 RT_{225} | — | September 8, 2004 | Socorro | LINEAR | · | 730 m | MPC · JPL |
| 409284 | 2004 RK_{236} | — | September 10, 2004 | Socorro | LINEAR | · | 670 m | MPC · JPL |
| 409285 | 2004 RX_{269} | — | September 11, 2004 | Kitt Peak | Spacewatch | · | 1.6 km | MPC · JPL |
| 409286 | 2004 RX_{288} | — | September 15, 2004 | Saint-Sulpice | B. Christophe | · | 1.7 km | MPC · JPL |
| 409287 | 2004 RA_{290} | — | September 15, 2004 | Anderson Mesa | LONEOS | H | 470 m | MPC · JPL |
| 409288 | 2004 RP_{293} | — | September 11, 2004 | Kitt Peak | Spacewatch | · | 1.8 km | MPC · JPL |
| 409289 | 2004 RR_{293} | — | August 25, 2004 | Kitt Peak | Spacewatch | · | 1.7 km | MPC · JPL |
| 409290 | 2004 RQ_{296} | — | September 11, 2004 | Kitt Peak | Spacewatch | · | 1.5 km | MPC · JPL |
| 409291 | 2004 RX_{337} | — | September 15, 2004 | Kitt Peak | Spacewatch | EOS | 1.6 km | MPC · JPL |
| 409292 | 2004 SP_{18} | — | September 18, 2004 | Socorro | LINEAR | BRA | 1.6 km | MPC · JPL |
| 409293 | 2004 SN_{32} | — | September 17, 2004 | Socorro | LINEAR | · | 770 m | MPC · JPL |
| 409294 | 2004 SR_{41} | — | September 18, 2004 | Socorro | LINEAR | · | 2.7 km | MPC · JPL |
| 409295 | 2004 SP_{46} | — | September 18, 2004 | Socorro | LINEAR | · | 2.1 km | MPC · JPL |
| 409296 | 2004 SV_{51} | — | August 27, 2004 | Anderson Mesa | LONEOS | · | 820 m | MPC · JPL |
| 409297 | 2004 TV_{3} | — | October 4, 2004 | Kitt Peak | Spacewatch | · | 1.9 km | MPC · JPL |
| 409298 | 2004 TH_{5} | — | October 4, 2004 | Kitt Peak | Spacewatch | V | 980 m | MPC · JPL |
| 409299 | 2004 TO_{10} | — | October 5, 2004 | Anderson Mesa | LONEOS | H | 510 m | MPC · JPL |
| 409300 | 2004 TJ_{20} | — | October 15, 2004 | Socorro | LINEAR | H | 440 m | MPC · JPL |

== 409301–409400 ==
back to top

| Designation | | | Discovery | | | Properties | | Ref |
| Permanent | Provisional | Named after | Date | Site | Discoverer(s) | Category | Diam. | Ref |
|---|---|---|---|---|---|---|---|---|
| 409301 | 2004 TB_{32} | — | October 4, 2004 | Kitt Peak | Spacewatch | · | 2.0 km | MPC · JPL |
| 409302 | 2004 TF_{45} | — | October 4, 2004 | Kitt Peak | Spacewatch | EOS | 1.8 km | MPC · JPL |
| 409303 | 2004 TU_{47} | — | October 4, 2004 | Kitt Peak | Spacewatch | · | 2.1 km | MPC · JPL |
| 409304 | 2004 TS_{58} | — | October 5, 2004 | Kitt Peak | Spacewatch | · | 1.6 km | MPC · JPL |
| 409305 | 2004 TZ_{69} | — | September 22, 2004 | Socorro | LINEAR | · | 2.8 km | MPC · JPL |
| 409306 | 2004 TA_{77} | — | October 7, 2004 | Kitt Peak | Spacewatch | · | 1.7 km | MPC · JPL |
| 409307 | 2004 TL_{97} | — | October 5, 2004 | Kitt Peak | Spacewatch | · | 1.6 km | MPC · JPL |
| 409308 | 2004 TV_{102} | — | October 6, 2004 | Palomar | NEAT | H | 640 m | MPC · JPL |
| 409309 | 2004 TM_{106} | — | October 7, 2004 | Socorro | LINEAR | · | 2.6 km | MPC · JPL |
| 409310 | 2004 TB_{138} | — | September 17, 2004 | Socorro | LINEAR | · | 820 m | MPC · JPL |
| 409311 | 2004 TZ_{149} | — | September 15, 2004 | Kitt Peak | Spacewatch | · | 580 m | MPC · JPL |
| 409312 | 2004 TS_{156} | — | October 6, 2004 | Kitt Peak | Spacewatch | · | 1.9 km | MPC · JPL |
| 409313 | 2004 TZ_{177} | — | October 7, 2004 | Kitt Peak | Spacewatch | · | 2.4 km | MPC · JPL |
| 409314 | 2004 TV_{180} | — | October 7, 2004 | Kitt Peak | Spacewatch | · | 3.5 km | MPC · JPL |
| 409315 | 2004 TR_{190} | — | October 7, 2004 | Kitt Peak | Spacewatch | · | 1.8 km | MPC · JPL |
| 409316 | 2004 TX_{198} | — | October 7, 2004 | Kitt Peak | Spacewatch | · | 2.9 km | MPC · JPL |
| 409317 | 2004 TN_{202} | — | October 7, 2004 | Kitt Peak | Spacewatch | · | 800 m | MPC · JPL |
| 409318 | 2004 TA_{221} | — | September 8, 2004 | Socorro | LINEAR | · | 660 m | MPC · JPL |
| 409319 | 2004 TU_{263} | — | October 9, 2004 | Kitt Peak | Spacewatch | · | 560 m | MPC · JPL |
| 409320 | 2004 TM_{277} | — | October 9, 2004 | Kitt Peak | Spacewatch | · | 670 m | MPC · JPL |
| 409321 | 2004 TY_{296} | — | October 10, 2004 | Kitt Peak | Spacewatch | · | 4.1 km | MPC · JPL |
| 409322 | 2004 TN_{333} | — | October 9, 2004 | Kitt Peak | Spacewatch | V | 640 m | MPC · JPL |
| 409323 | 2004 TA_{341} | — | October 13, 2004 | Kitt Peak | Spacewatch | · | 2.1 km | MPC · JPL |
| 409324 | 2004 TV_{350} | — | October 10, 2004 | Kitt Peak | M. W. Buie | · | 2.0 km | MPC · JPL |
| 409325 | 2004 TA_{351} | — | October 10, 2004 | Kitt Peak | Spacewatch | EOS | 1.6 km | MPC · JPL |
| 409326 | 2004 TC_{367} | — | October 4, 2004 | Kitt Peak | Spacewatch | · | 590 m | MPC · JPL |
| 409327 | 2004 TL_{367} | — | October 10, 2004 | Socorro | LINEAR | · | 3.0 km | MPC · JPL |
| 409328 | 2004 TC_{368} | — | October 7, 2004 | Kitt Peak | Spacewatch | · | 950 m | MPC · JPL |
| 409329 | 2004 TZ_{368} | — | October 7, 2004 | Kitt Peak | Spacewatch | · | 1.8 km | MPC · JPL |
| 409330 | 2004 TF_{370} | — | October 5, 2004 | Kitt Peak | Spacewatch | · | 770 m | MPC · JPL |
| 409331 | 2004 VX | — | November 3, 2004 | Anderson Mesa | LONEOS | · | 1.1 km | MPC · JPL |
| 409332 | 2004 VP_{3} | — | November 3, 2004 | Kitt Peak | Spacewatch | · | 660 m | MPC · JPL |
| 409333 | 2004 VG_{18} | — | November 4, 2004 | Kitt Peak | Spacewatch | · | 2.6 km | MPC · JPL |
| 409334 | 2004 VY_{37} | — | November 4, 2004 | Kitt Peak | Spacewatch | EOS · | 2.7 km | MPC · JPL |
| 409335 | 2004 VX_{38} | — | November 4, 2004 | Kitt Peak | Spacewatch | · | 1.8 km | MPC · JPL |
| 409336 | 2004 VE_{42} | — | October 15, 2004 | Mount Lemmon | Mount Lemmon Survey | · | 2.8 km | MPC · JPL |
| 409337 | 2004 VE_{53} | — | November 5, 2004 | Palomar | NEAT | · | 2.6 km | MPC · JPL |
| 409338 | 2004 VK_{67} | — | November 9, 2004 | Kitt Peak | M. W. Buie | · | 1.6 km | MPC · JPL |
| 409339 | 2004 VM_{69} | — | November 10, 2004 | Kitt Peak | Spacewatch | · | 490 m | MPC · JPL |
| 409340 | 2004 VZ_{71} | — | November 11, 2004 | Kitt Peak | Spacewatch | · | 760 m | MPC · JPL |
| 409341 | 2004 XX_{26} | — | December 10, 2004 | Socorro | LINEAR | · | 800 m | MPC · JPL |
| 409342 | 2004 XM_{35} | — | December 12, 2004 | Palomar | NEAT | AMO | 370 m | MPC · JPL |
| 409343 | 2004 XM_{46} | — | December 9, 2004 | Kitt Peak | Spacewatch | · | 750 m | MPC · JPL |
| 409344 | 2004 XP_{48} | — | December 10, 2004 | Kitt Peak | Spacewatch | · | 3.7 km | MPC · JPL |
| 409345 | 2004 XQ_{58} | — | December 10, 2004 | Kitt Peak | Spacewatch | · | 1.2 km | MPC · JPL |
| 409346 | 2004 XF_{68} | — | December 3, 2004 | Kitt Peak | Spacewatch | · | 1.2 km | MPC · JPL |
| 409347 | 2004 XJ_{70} | — | December 11, 2004 | Socorro | LINEAR | · | 960 m | MPC · JPL |
| 409348 | 2004 XQ_{70} | — | December 11, 2004 | Socorro | LINEAR | · | 3.4 km | MPC · JPL |
| 409349 | 2004 XB_{90} | — | December 11, 2004 | Kitt Peak | Spacewatch | KOR | 1.5 km | MPC · JPL |
| 409350 | 2004 XU_{90} | — | December 11, 2004 | Kitt Peak | Spacewatch | · | 2.9 km | MPC · JPL |
| 409351 | 2004 XR_{110} | — | December 14, 2004 | Socorro | LINEAR | · | 780 m | MPC · JPL |
| 409352 | 2004 XW_{118} | — | December 12, 2004 | Kitt Peak | Spacewatch | · | 620 m | MPC · JPL |
| 409353 | 2004 XT_{128} | — | December 14, 2004 | Socorro | LINEAR | · | 2.7 km | MPC · JPL |
| 409354 | 2004 XE_{160} | — | December 14, 2004 | Kitt Peak | Spacewatch | · | 860 m | MPC · JPL |
| 409355 | 2004 XT_{166} | — | December 2, 2004 | Palomar | NEAT | EOS | 2.4 km | MPC · JPL |
| 409356 | 2004 XT_{191} | — | December 12, 2004 | Kitt Peak | Spacewatch | · | 1.7 km | MPC · JPL |
| 409357 | 2004 YK_{23} | — | December 18, 2004 | Mount Lemmon | Mount Lemmon Survey | · | 1.3 km | MPC · JPL |
| 409358 | 2004 YY_{33} | — | December 17, 2004 | Haleakala | NEAT | · | 4.1 km | MPC · JPL |
| 409359 | 2005 AA_{1} | — | January 1, 2005 | Catalina | CSS | · | 2.7 km | MPC · JPL |
| 409360 | 2005 AG_{1} | — | January 1, 2005 | Catalina | CSS | · | 1.1 km | MPC · JPL |
| 409361 | 2005 AP_{6} | — | January 6, 2005 | Socorro | LINEAR | · | 2.5 km | MPC · JPL |
| 409362 | 2005 AA_{7} | — | January 6, 2005 | Catalina | CSS | H | 620 m | MPC · JPL |
| 409363 | 2005 AA_{17} | — | January 6, 2005 | Socorro | LINEAR | · | 1.4 km | MPC · JPL |
| 409364 | 2005 AS_{18} | — | January 8, 2005 | Socorro | LINEAR | · | 3.1 km | MPC · JPL |
| 409365 | 2005 AX_{33} | — | January 13, 2005 | Kitt Peak | Spacewatch | · | 700 m | MPC · JPL |
| 409366 | 2005 AH_{44} | — | January 15, 2005 | Kitt Peak | Spacewatch | · | 2.1 km | MPC · JPL |
| 409367 | 2005 AS_{44} | — | January 15, 2005 | Socorro | LINEAR | · | 3.7 km | MPC · JPL |
| 409368 | 2005 AP_{52} | — | January 13, 2005 | Kitt Peak | Spacewatch | NYS | 950 m | MPC · JPL |
| 409369 | 2005 AL_{70} | — | January 15, 2005 | Catalina | CSS | H | 570 m | MPC · JPL |
| 409370 | 2005 AH_{80} | — | January 15, 2005 | Kitt Peak | Spacewatch | EOS | 2.0 km | MPC · JPL |
| 409371 | 2005 BQ_{8} | — | January 16, 2005 | Socorro | LINEAR | · | 4.3 km | MPC · JPL |
| 409372 | 2005 BX_{11} | — | January 17, 2005 | Kitt Peak | Spacewatch | VER | 2.6 km | MPC · JPL |
| 409373 | 2005 BM_{24} | — | January 17, 2005 | Catalina | CSS | PHO | 1.5 km | MPC · JPL |
| 409374 | 2005 CB_{12} | — | December 18, 2004 | Mount Lemmon | Mount Lemmon Survey | TIR | 3.8 km | MPC · JPL |
| 409375 | 2005 CN_{15} | — | January 16, 2005 | Kitt Peak | Spacewatch | · | 810 m | MPC · JPL |
| 409376 | 2005 CY_{17} | — | January 17, 2005 | Kitt Peak | Spacewatch | · | 830 m | MPC · JPL |
| 409377 | 2005 CE_{20} | — | February 2, 2005 | Catalina | CSS | PHO | 1.3 km | MPC · JPL |
| 409378 | 2005 CW_{20} | — | January 13, 2005 | Kitt Peak | Spacewatch | · | 1.2 km | MPC · JPL |
| 409379 | 2005 CK_{29} | — | February 1, 2005 | Kitt Peak | Spacewatch | · | 3.4 km | MPC · JPL |
| 409380 | 2005 CW_{29} | — | February 1, 2005 | Kitt Peak | Spacewatch | · | 1.2 km | MPC · JPL |
| 409381 | 2005 CF_{44} | — | February 2, 2005 | Kitt Peak | Spacewatch | V | 780 m | MPC · JPL |
| 409382 | 2005 CT_{65} | — | February 9, 2005 | Kitt Peak | Spacewatch | H | 590 m | MPC · JPL |
| 409383 | 2005 DQ_{1} | — | February 17, 2005 | La Silla | A. Boattini, H. Scholl | · | 920 m | MPC · JPL |
| 409384 | 2005 EH | — | March 1, 2005 | Socorro | LINEAR | PHO | 1.1 km | MPC · JPL |
| 409385 | 2005 ED_{16} | — | March 3, 2005 | Kitt Peak | Spacewatch | · | 720 m | MPC · JPL |
| 409386 | 2005 EA_{30} | — | March 5, 2005 | La Silla | Gauderon, R., Behrend, R. | · | 1.2 km | MPC · JPL |
| 409387 | 2005 EX_{30} | — | March 3, 2005 | Catalina | CSS | · | 2.7 km | MPC · JPL |
| 409388 | 2005 EL_{34} | — | March 3, 2005 | Catalina | CSS | · | 1.4 km | MPC · JPL |
| 409389 | 2005 EP_{45} | — | March 3, 2005 | Catalina | CSS | NYS | 1.1 km | MPC · JPL |
| 409390 | 2005 ET_{58} | — | March 4, 2005 | Kitt Peak | Spacewatch | LIX | 3.5 km | MPC · JPL |
| 409391 | 2005 EV_{66} | — | March 4, 2005 | Mount Lemmon | Mount Lemmon Survey | · | 2.6 km | MPC · JPL |
| 409392 | 2005 EM_{73} | — | March 3, 2005 | Kitt Peak | Spacewatch | NYS | 930 m | MPC · JPL |
| 409393 | 2005 ER_{97} | — | March 3, 2005 | Catalina | CSS | ERI | 1.7 km | MPC · JPL |
| 409394 | 2005 EE_{103} | — | March 4, 2005 | Kitt Peak | Spacewatch | NYS | 1.3 km | MPC · JPL |
| 409395 | 2005 EF_{174} | — | March 8, 2005 | Kitt Peak | Spacewatch | · | 1.3 km | MPC · JPL |
| 409396 | 2005 EX_{184} | — | March 9, 2005 | Kitt Peak | Spacewatch | · | 2.2 km | MPC · JPL |
| 409397 | 2005 EF_{202} | — | March 8, 2005 | Socorro | LINEAR | TIR | 3.4 km | MPC · JPL |
| 409398 | 2005 EA_{207} | — | March 13, 2005 | Kitt Peak | Spacewatch | NYS | 1.1 km | MPC · JPL |
| 409399 | 2005 EE_{225} | — | March 13, 2005 | Socorro | LINEAR | EUP | 4.2 km | MPC · JPL |
| 409400 | 2005 EW_{245} | — | March 12, 2005 | Kitt Peak | Spacewatch | NYS | 1.2 km | MPC · JPL |

== 409401–409500 ==
back to top

| Designation | | | Discovery | | | Properties | | Ref |
| Permanent | Provisional | Named after | Date | Site | Discoverer(s) | Category | Diam. | Ref |
|---|---|---|---|---|---|---|---|---|
| 409401 | 2005 EF_{261} | — | March 12, 2005 | Socorro | LINEAR | · | 1.2 km | MPC · JPL |
| 409402 | 2005 EA_{270} | — | March 11, 2005 | Kitt Peak | Spacewatch | NYS | 1.2 km | MPC · JPL |
| 409403 | 2005 EF_{276} | — | March 8, 2005 | Mount Lemmon | Mount Lemmon Survey | · | 1.3 km | MPC · JPL |
| 409404 | 2005 EK_{297} | — | March 11, 2005 | Kitt Peak | M. W. Buie | THM | 2.2 km | MPC · JPL |
| 409405 | 2005 GL_{14} | — | April 2, 2005 | Kitt Peak | Spacewatch | · | 1.3 km | MPC · JPL |
| 409406 | 2005 GY_{33} | — | April 5, 2005 | Goodricke-Pigott | R. A. Tucker | · | 1.2 km | MPC · JPL |
| 409407 | 2005 GO_{60} | — | April 6, 2005 | Anderson Mesa | LONEOS | · | 1.3 km | MPC · JPL |
| 409408 | 2005 GV_{94} | — | April 6, 2005 | Kitt Peak | Spacewatch | · | 1.5 km | MPC · JPL |
| 409409 | 2005 GC_{119} | — | April 11, 2005 | Mount Lemmon | Mount Lemmon Survey | MAS | 720 m | MPC · JPL |
| 409410 | 2005 GX_{122} | — | April 6, 2005 | Mount Lemmon | Mount Lemmon Survey | EUN | 1.1 km | MPC · JPL |
| 409411 | 2005 GV_{140} | — | March 3, 2005 | Kitt Peak | Spacewatch | · | 1.4 km | MPC · JPL |
| 409412 | 2005 GL_{163} | — | April 10, 2005 | Mount Lemmon | Mount Lemmon Survey | · | 1.0 km | MPC · JPL |
| 409413 | 2005 GO_{168} | — | April 12, 2005 | Kitt Peak | Spacewatch | H | 480 m | MPC · JPL |
| 409414 | 2005 GE_{176} | — | April 14, 2005 | Kitt Peak | Spacewatch | · | 1.3 km | MPC · JPL |
| 409415 | 2005 GL_{178} | — | April 15, 2005 | Kitt Peak | Spacewatch | T_{j} (2.98) · EUP | 4.0 km | MPC · JPL |
| 409416 | 2005 GR_{200} | — | April 4, 2005 | Mount Lemmon | Mount Lemmon Survey | V | 560 m | MPC · JPL |
| 409417 | 2005 GK_{205} | — | April 11, 2005 | Kitt Peak | M. W. Buie | · | 1.1 km | MPC · JPL |
| 409418 | 2005 JK_{5} | — | May 1, 2005 | Palomar | NEAT | H | 730 m | MPC · JPL |
| 409419 | 2005 JO_{43} | — | May 8, 2005 | Kitt Peak | Spacewatch | · | 2.1 km | MPC · JPL |
| 409420 | 2005 JL_{75} | — | April 15, 2005 | Catalina | CSS | · | 1.7 km | MPC · JPL |
| 409421 | 2005 JD_{97} | — | May 8, 2005 | Kitt Peak | Spacewatch | H | 580 m | MPC · JPL |
| 409422 | 2005 JG_{98} | — | May 8, 2005 | Kitt Peak | Spacewatch | · | 1.0 km | MPC · JPL |
| 409423 | 2005 JQ_{125} | — | May 11, 2005 | Kitt Peak | Spacewatch | · | 1.3 km | MPC · JPL |
| 409424 | 2005 JD_{133} | — | May 14, 2005 | Kitt Peak | Spacewatch | · | 870 m | MPC · JPL |
| 409425 | 2005 JU_{143} | — | May 15, 2005 | Mount Lemmon | Mount Lemmon Survey | · | 1.1 km | MPC · JPL |
| 409426 | 2005 LN_{21} | — | June 6, 2005 | Kitt Peak | Spacewatch | · | 2.0 km | MPC · JPL |
| 409427 | 2005 LW_{32} | — | June 9, 2005 | Kitt Peak | Spacewatch | JUN | 1.0 km | MPC · JPL |
| 409428 | 2005 LZ_{50} | — | June 13, 2005 | Mount Lemmon | Mount Lemmon Survey | · | 2.7 km | MPC · JPL |
| 409429 | 2005 MX_{35} | — | June 30, 2005 | Kitt Peak | Spacewatch | · | 1.9 km | MPC · JPL |
| 409430 | 2005 NE_{44} | — | June 15, 2005 | Mount Lemmon | Mount Lemmon Survey | · | 1.5 km | MPC · JPL |
| 409431 | 2005 NB_{52} | — | June 28, 2005 | Kitt Peak | Spacewatch | · | 1.3 km | MPC · JPL |
| 409432 | 2005 NZ_{77} | — | July 11, 2005 | Kitt Peak | Spacewatch | 3:2 | 5.9 km | MPC · JPL |
| 409433 | 2005 NZ_{90} | — | July 5, 2005 | Mount Lemmon | Mount Lemmon Survey | BRU | 2.2 km | MPC · JPL |
| 409434 | 2005 NB_{101} | — | July 8, 2005 | Anderson Mesa | LONEOS | · | 2.4 km | MPC · JPL |
| 409435 | 2005 NC_{107} | — | December 22, 2003 | Kitt Peak | Spacewatch | · | 700 m | MPC · JPL |
| 409436 | 2005 OD_{11} | — | July 28, 2005 | Palomar | NEAT | · | 1.9 km | MPC · JPL |
| 409437 | 2005 OV_{13} | — | March 15, 2004 | Kitt Peak | Spacewatch | EUN | 1.0 km | MPC · JPL |
| 409438 | 2005 OA_{16} | — | July 29, 2005 | Palomar | NEAT | EUN | 1.5 km | MPC · JPL |
| 409439 | 2005 OP_{19} | — | July 28, 2005 | Palomar | NEAT | · | 1.5 km | MPC · JPL |
| 409440 | 2005 OK_{31} | — | July 27, 2005 | Siding Spring | SSS | · | 2.0 km | MPC · JPL |
| 409441 | 2005 PB_{21} | — | August 6, 2005 | Palomar | NEAT | MIS | 2.7 km | MPC · JPL |
| 409442 | 2005 QD_{5} | — | August 24, 2005 | Siding Spring | SSS | · | 4.3 km | MPC · JPL |
| 409443 | 2005 QX_{34} | — | August 25, 2005 | Palomar | NEAT | · | 1.8 km | MPC · JPL |
| 409444 | 2005 QO_{41} | — | July 9, 2005 | Catalina | CSS | JUN | 1.2 km | MPC · JPL |
| 409445 | 2005 QU_{59} | — | August 25, 2005 | Palomar | NEAT | · | 2.0 km | MPC · JPL |
| 409446 | 2005 QG_{66} | — | August 27, 2005 | Anderson Mesa | LONEOS | ADE | 1.7 km | MPC · JPL |
| 409447 | 2005 QJ_{77} | — | June 17, 2005 | Mount Lemmon | Mount Lemmon Survey | · | 1.7 km | MPC · JPL |
| 409448 | 2005 QV_{100} | — | August 27, 2005 | Palomar | NEAT | · | 1.4 km | MPC · JPL |
| 409449 | 2005 QK_{106} | — | August 27, 2005 | Palomar | NEAT | · | 2.1 km | MPC · JPL |
| 409450 | 2005 QM_{114} | — | August 27, 2005 | Palomar | NEAT | · | 2.2 km | MPC · JPL |
| 409451 | 2005 QL_{122} | — | August 28, 2005 | Kitt Peak | Spacewatch | · | 1.5 km | MPC · JPL |
| 409452 | 2005 QC_{134} | — | August 28, 2005 | Kitt Peak | Spacewatch | · | 2.0 km | MPC · JPL |
| 409453 | 2005 QW_{135} | — | August 28, 2005 | Kitt Peak | Spacewatch | · | 1.4 km | MPC · JPL |
| 409454 | 2005 QQ_{139} | — | August 28, 2005 | Kitt Peak | Spacewatch | · | 1.7 km | MPC · JPL |
| 409455 | 2005 QM_{163} | — | August 30, 2005 | Kitt Peak | Spacewatch | · | 2.3 km | MPC · JPL |
| 409456 | 2005 QO_{163} | — | August 30, 2005 | Kitt Peak | Spacewatch | · | 2.0 km | MPC · JPL |
| 409457 | 2005 QE_{165} | — | August 31, 2005 | Palomar | NEAT | · | 2.2 km | MPC · JPL |
| 409458 | 2005 QH_{181} | — | August 30, 2005 | Anderson Mesa | LONEOS | · | 2.3 km | MPC · JPL |
| 409459 | 2005 QL_{187} | — | August 31, 2005 | Kitt Peak | Spacewatch | · | 1.7 km | MPC · JPL |
| 409460 | 2005 RU_{7} | — | September 8, 2005 | Socorro | LINEAR | · | 2.3 km | MPC · JPL |
| 409461 | 2005 RY_{51} | — | September 3, 2005 | Catalina | CSS | EUN | 1.4 km | MPC · JPL |
| 409462 | 2005 SP_{3} | — | September 23, 2005 | Kitt Peak | Spacewatch | AEO | 1.2 km | MPC · JPL |
| 409463 | 2005 SZ_{15} | — | September 1, 2005 | Kitt Peak | Spacewatch | · | 1.9 km | MPC · JPL |
| 409464 | 2005 SK_{16} | — | August 30, 2005 | Anderson Mesa | LONEOS | GEF | 1.6 km | MPC · JPL |
| 409465 | 2005 SG_{21} | — | September 26, 2005 | Kitt Peak | Spacewatch | · | 1.9 km | MPC · JPL |
| 409466 | 2005 SQ_{26} | — | September 23, 2005 | Kitt Peak | Spacewatch | · | 2.4 km | MPC · JPL |
| 409467 | 2005 SU_{31} | — | September 23, 2005 | Kitt Peak | Spacewatch | · | 1.8 km | MPC · JPL |
| 409468 | 2005 SJ_{34} | — | September 23, 2005 | Kitt Peak | Spacewatch | DOR | 2.4 km | MPC · JPL |
| 409469 | 2005 SO_{41} | — | September 24, 2005 | Kitt Peak | Spacewatch | · | 1.5 km | MPC · JPL |
| 409470 | 2005 SC_{48} | — | September 24, 2005 | Kitt Peak | Spacewatch | · | 1.6 km | MPC · JPL |
| 409471 | 2005 SX_{48} | — | September 24, 2005 | Kitt Peak | Spacewatch | · | 1.6 km | MPC · JPL |
| 409472 | 2005 SD_{50} | — | September 24, 2005 | Kitt Peak | Spacewatch | · | 2.6 km | MPC · JPL |
| 409473 | 2005 SN_{54} | — | September 25, 2005 | Kitt Peak | Spacewatch | · | 1.7 km | MPC · JPL |
| 409474 | 2005 SO_{54} | — | September 25, 2005 | Kitt Peak | Spacewatch | PAD | 1.8 km | MPC · JPL |
| 409475 | 2005 SP_{54} | — | September 25, 2005 | Kitt Peak | Spacewatch | · | 1.9 km | MPC · JPL |
| 409476 | 2005 SN_{57} | — | September 26, 2005 | Kitt Peak | Spacewatch | · | 1.8 km | MPC · JPL |
| 409477 | 2005 SP_{64} | — | September 26, 2005 | Kitt Peak | Spacewatch | · | 1.8 km | MPC · JPL |
| 409478 | 2005 SN_{76} | — | September 24, 2005 | Kitt Peak | Spacewatch | · | 1.9 km | MPC · JPL |
| 409479 | 2005 SX_{76} | — | September 24, 2005 | Kitt Peak | Spacewatch | · | 1.5 km | MPC · JPL |
| 409480 | 2005 SW_{78} | — | September 24, 2005 | Kitt Peak | Spacewatch | · | 1.8 km | MPC · JPL |
| 409481 | 2005 SN_{82} | — | September 24, 2005 | Kitt Peak | Spacewatch | · | 1.5 km | MPC · JPL |
| 409482 | 2005 ST_{83} | — | September 24, 2005 | Kitt Peak | Spacewatch | · | 1.7 km | MPC · JPL |
| 409483 | 2005 SH_{91} | — | September 24, 2005 | Kitt Peak | Spacewatch | · | 1.9 km | MPC · JPL |
| 409484 | 2005 SE_{98} | — | September 25, 2005 | Kitt Peak | Spacewatch | · | 2.1 km | MPC · JPL |
| 409485 | 2005 SB_{105} | — | September 25, 2005 | Palomar | NEAT | · | 2.4 km | MPC · JPL |
| 409486 | 2005 SR_{107} | — | September 26, 2005 | Catalina | CSS | · | 2.6 km | MPC · JPL |
| 409487 | 2005 SP_{109} | — | September 26, 2005 | Kitt Peak | Spacewatch | · | 2.0 km | MPC · JPL |
| 409488 | 2005 SP_{112} | — | September 26, 2005 | Catalina | CSS | EUN | 1.6 km | MPC · JPL |
| 409489 | 2005 SS_{112} | — | September 26, 2005 | Palomar | NEAT | · | 2.1 km | MPC · JPL |
| 409490 | 2005 SQ_{122} | — | August 29, 2005 | Anderson Mesa | LONEOS | · | 2.3 km | MPC · JPL |
| 409491 | 2005 SJ_{130} | — | September 24, 2005 | Kitt Peak | Spacewatch | · | 770 m | MPC · JPL |
| 409492 | 2005 SE_{131} | — | September 29, 2005 | Mount Lemmon | Mount Lemmon Survey | · | 1.1 km | MPC · JPL |
| 409493 | 2005 SG_{146} | — | September 25, 2005 | Catalina | CSS | · | 2.0 km | MPC · JPL |
| 409494 | 2005 SJ_{154} | — | September 1, 2005 | Kitt Peak | Spacewatch | · | 1.8 km | MPC · JPL |
| 409495 | 2005 SV_{177} | — | September 29, 2005 | Kitt Peak | Spacewatch | · | 1.8 km | MPC · JPL |
| 409496 | 2005 SD_{182} | — | September 24, 2005 | Kitt Peak | Spacewatch | HOF | 2.9 km | MPC · JPL |
| 409497 | 2005 SY_{182} | — | September 29, 2005 | Kitt Peak | Spacewatch | · | 1.8 km | MPC · JPL |
| 409498 | 2005 SC_{207} | — | September 30, 2005 | Mount Lemmon | Mount Lemmon Survey | HOF | 2.1 km | MPC · JPL |
| 409499 | 2005 SY_{212} | — | September 30, 2005 | Mount Lemmon | Mount Lemmon Survey | · | 1.9 km | MPC · JPL |
| 409500 | 2005 SW_{215} | — | September 12, 2005 | Socorro | LINEAR | · | 2.2 km | MPC · JPL |

== 409501–409600 ==
back to top

| Designation | | | Discovery | | | Properties | | Ref |
| Permanent | Provisional | Named after | Date | Site | Discoverer(s) | Category | Diam. | Ref |
|---|---|---|---|---|---|---|---|---|
| 409501 | 2005 SL_{223} | — | September 29, 2005 | Kitt Peak | Spacewatch | · | 2.1 km | MPC · JPL |
| 409502 | 2005 SZ_{234} | — | September 29, 2005 | Mount Lemmon | Mount Lemmon Survey | · | 1.6 km | MPC · JPL |
| 409503 | 2005 SL_{241} | — | September 30, 2005 | Kitt Peak | Spacewatch | PAD | 1.7 km | MPC · JPL |
| 409504 | 2005 SY_{246} | — | September 30, 2005 | Kitt Peak | Spacewatch | · | 2.2 km | MPC · JPL |
| 409505 | 2005 ST_{258} | — | September 23, 2005 | Catalina | CSS | · | 1.5 km | MPC · JPL |
| 409506 | 2005 SU_{262} | — | September 23, 2005 | Kitt Peak | Spacewatch | · | 1.8 km | MPC · JPL |
| 409507 | 2005 SX_{264} | — | September 25, 2005 | Kitt Peak | Spacewatch | · | 1.8 km | MPC · JPL |
| 409508 | 2005 SB_{286} | — | September 25, 2005 | Apache Point | A. C. Becker | DOR | 2.1 km | MPC · JPL |
| 409509 | 2005 SX_{291} | — | September 27, 2005 | Kitt Peak | Spacewatch | · | 1.7 km | MPC · JPL |
| 409510 | 2005 TM_{3} | — | September 12, 2005 | Socorro | LINEAR | · | 3.0 km | MPC · JPL |
| 409511 | 2005 TC_{4} | — | October 1, 2005 | Anderson Mesa | LONEOS | · | 2.1 km | MPC · JPL |
| 409512 | 2005 TL_{22} | — | September 1, 2005 | Kitt Peak | Spacewatch | · | 2.0 km | MPC · JPL |
| 409513 | 2005 TL_{38} | — | October 1, 2005 | Mount Lemmon | Mount Lemmon Survey | · | 1.7 km | MPC · JPL |
| 409514 | 2005 TG_{52} | — | October 5, 2005 | Kitt Peak | Spacewatch | NEM | 2.2 km | MPC · JPL |
| 409515 | 2005 TY_{53} | — | October 1, 2005 | Socorro | LINEAR | (21344) | 2.0 km | MPC · JPL |
| 409516 | 2005 TJ_{54} | — | October 1, 2005 | Mount Lemmon | Mount Lemmon Survey | · | 2.0 km | MPC · JPL |
| 409517 | 2005 TE_{60} | — | October 3, 2005 | Kitt Peak | Spacewatch | · | 1.7 km | MPC · JPL |
| 409518 | 2005 TG_{62} | — | October 4, 2005 | Mount Lemmon | Mount Lemmon Survey | (13314) | 1.8 km | MPC · JPL |
| 409519 | 2005 TQ_{74} | — | September 23, 2005 | Catalina | CSS | · | 2.1 km | MPC · JPL |
| 409520 | 2005 TP_{77} | — | October 6, 2005 | Catalina | CSS | · | 2.1 km | MPC · JPL |
| 409521 | 2005 TM_{81} | — | October 3, 2005 | Kitt Peak | Spacewatch | · | 1.6 km | MPC · JPL |
| 409522 | 2005 TD_{89} | — | October 5, 2005 | Mount Lemmon | Mount Lemmon Survey | · | 2.0 km | MPC · JPL |
| 409523 | 2005 TS_{108} | — | September 29, 2005 | Kitt Peak | Spacewatch | · | 2.3 km | MPC · JPL |
| 409524 | 2005 TO_{110} | — | October 7, 2005 | Kitt Peak | Spacewatch | PAD | 1.7 km | MPC · JPL |
| 409525 | 2005 TR_{112} | — | October 7, 2005 | Kitt Peak | Spacewatch | · | 1.6 km | MPC · JPL |
| 409526 | 2005 TX_{112} | — | September 27, 2005 | Kitt Peak | Spacewatch | · | 1.4 km | MPC · JPL |
| 409527 | 2005 TE_{115} | — | October 7, 2005 | Kitt Peak | Spacewatch | · | 1.7 km | MPC · JPL |
| 409528 | 2005 TP_{127} | — | October 7, 2005 | Kitt Peak | Spacewatch | HOF | 2.3 km | MPC · JPL |
| 409529 | 2005 TY_{131} | — | October 7, 2005 | Kitt Peak | Spacewatch | · | 2.1 km | MPC · JPL |
| 409530 | 2005 TB_{138} | — | October 1, 2005 | Socorro | LINEAR | · | 1.9 km | MPC · JPL |
| 409531 | 2005 TG_{138} | — | October 7, 2005 | Catalina | CSS | · | 1.9 km | MPC · JPL |
| 409532 | 2005 TT_{142} | — | October 8, 2005 | Kitt Peak | Spacewatch | · | 2.0 km | MPC · JPL |
| 409533 | 2005 TU_{143} | — | September 29, 2005 | Kitt Peak | Spacewatch | · | 1.9 km | MPC · JPL |
| 409534 | 2005 TQ_{149} | — | October 8, 2005 | Kitt Peak | Spacewatch | · | 1.9 km | MPC · JPL |
| 409535 | 2005 TO_{163} | — | October 9, 2005 | Kitt Peak | Spacewatch | WIT | 970 m | MPC · JPL |
| 409536 | 2005 TP_{175} | — | October 3, 2005 | Catalina | CSS | · | 2.8 km | MPC · JPL |
| 409537 | 2005 TH_{178} | — | October 1, 2005 | Catalina | CSS | · | 2.0 km | MPC · JPL |
| 409538 | 2005 TQ_{187} | — | September 27, 2005 | Kitt Peak | Spacewatch | AGN | 1.0 km | MPC · JPL |
| 409539 | 2005 UV_{3} | — | October 26, 2005 | Socorro | LINEAR | · | 2.8 km | MPC · JPL |
| 409540 | 2005 UM_{11} | — | October 22, 2005 | Kitt Peak | Spacewatch | AGN | 1.2 km | MPC · JPL |
| 409541 | 2005 UV_{14} | — | October 22, 2005 | Kitt Peak | Spacewatch | · | 1.7 km | MPC · JPL |
| 409542 | 2005 UP_{22} | — | October 23, 2005 | Kitt Peak | Spacewatch | · | 2.2 km | MPC · JPL |
| 409543 | 2005 UF_{38} | — | October 24, 2005 | Kitt Peak | Spacewatch | · | 1.8 km | MPC · JPL |
| 409544 | 2005 UU_{38} | — | October 24, 2005 | Kitt Peak | Spacewatch | AGN | 1.3 km | MPC · JPL |
| 409545 | 2005 UX_{56} | — | October 23, 2005 | Catalina | CSS | · | 2.3 km | MPC · JPL |
| 409546 | 2005 UG_{59} | — | October 1, 2005 | Mount Lemmon | Mount Lemmon Survey | · | 2.3 km | MPC · JPL |
| 409547 | 2005 UL_{69} | — | October 1, 2005 | Anderson Mesa | LONEOS | GEF | 1.4 km | MPC · JPL |
| 409548 | 2005 UV_{69} | — | October 23, 2005 | Catalina | CSS | · | 2.7 km | MPC · JPL |
| 409549 | 2005 UJ_{74} | — | October 1, 2005 | Socorro | LINEAR | · | 2.4 km | MPC · JPL |
| 409550 | 2005 UX_{74} | — | October 23, 2005 | Catalina | CSS | EUN | 1.7 km | MPC · JPL |
| 409551 | 2005 UV_{77} | — | September 30, 2005 | Kitt Peak | Spacewatch | NEM | 2.0 km | MPC · JPL |
| 409552 | 2005 UP_{92} | — | October 22, 2005 | Kitt Peak | Spacewatch | · | 2.2 km | MPC · JPL |
| 409553 | 2005 UQ_{93} | — | October 22, 2005 | Kitt Peak | Spacewatch | MRX | 1.0 km | MPC · JPL |
| 409554 | 2005 UM_{94} | — | October 22, 2005 | Kitt Peak | Spacewatch | · | 2.0 km | MPC · JPL |
| 409555 | 2005 UA_{95} | — | October 22, 2005 | Kitt Peak | Spacewatch | · | 2.4 km | MPC · JPL |
| 409556 | 2005 UO_{99} | — | October 22, 2005 | Kitt Peak | Spacewatch | AEO | 1.0 km | MPC · JPL |
| 409557 | 2005 UV_{100} | — | October 22, 2005 | Kitt Peak | Spacewatch | · | 2.2 km | MPC · JPL |
| 409558 | 2005 UX_{103} | — | October 22, 2005 | Kitt Peak | Spacewatch | MRX | 940 m | MPC · JPL |
| 409559 | 2005 UO_{109} | — | October 22, 2005 | Kitt Peak | Spacewatch | MRX | 1.1 km | MPC · JPL |
| 409560 | 2005 UY_{109} | — | October 22, 2005 | Kitt Peak | Spacewatch | · | 1.8 km | MPC · JPL |
| 409561 | 2005 UR_{113} | — | October 22, 2005 | Kitt Peak | Spacewatch | · | 2.1 km | MPC · JPL |
| 409562 | 2005 UV_{114} | — | October 22, 2005 | Palomar | NEAT | · | 1.7 km | MPC · JPL |
| 409563 | 2005 UO_{115} | — | October 23, 2005 | Kitt Peak | Spacewatch | NEM | 2.2 km | MPC · JPL |
| 409564 | 2005 UX_{120} | — | October 24, 2005 | Kitt Peak | Spacewatch | · | 2.4 km | MPC · JPL |
| 409565 | 2005 UD_{121} | — | October 24, 2005 | Kitt Peak | Spacewatch | HOF | 2.4 km | MPC · JPL |
| 409566 | 2005 UV_{124} | — | October 24, 2005 | Kitt Peak | Spacewatch | · | 1.7 km | MPC · JPL |
| 409567 | 2005 UC_{148} | — | October 26, 2005 | Kitt Peak | Spacewatch | HOF | 2.4 km | MPC · JPL |
| 409568 | 2005 UE_{157} | — | October 27, 2005 | Mount Lemmon | Mount Lemmon Survey | · | 2.0 km | MPC · JPL |
| 409569 | 2005 UC_{168} | — | October 9, 2005 | Kitt Peak | Spacewatch | · | 1.7 km | MPC · JPL |
| 409570 | 2005 UR_{170} | — | October 24, 2005 | Kitt Peak | Spacewatch | · | 2.0 km | MPC · JPL |
| 409571 | 2005 UT_{180} | — | October 24, 2005 | Kitt Peak | Spacewatch | · | 2.1 km | MPC · JPL |
| 409572 | 2005 UK_{182} | — | October 24, 2005 | Kitt Peak | Spacewatch | · | 980 m | MPC · JPL |
| 409573 | 2005 UZ_{183} | — | October 25, 2005 | Mount Lemmon | Mount Lemmon Survey | KOR | 1.2 km | MPC · JPL |
| 409574 | 2005 UP_{191} | — | October 27, 2005 | Mount Lemmon | Mount Lemmon Survey | · | 2.0 km | MPC · JPL |
| 409575 | 2005 UM_{197} | — | October 25, 2005 | Mount Lemmon | Mount Lemmon Survey | · | 2.2 km | MPC · JPL |
| 409576 | 2005 UT_{197} | — | October 25, 2005 | Kitt Peak | Spacewatch | · | 1.5 km | MPC · JPL |
| 409577 | 2005 UB_{198} | — | October 25, 2005 | Kitt Peak | Spacewatch | EUN | 1.4 km | MPC · JPL |
| 409578 | 2005 UK_{199} | — | October 25, 2005 | Kitt Peak | Spacewatch | · | 2.4 km | MPC · JPL |
| 409579 | 2005 UJ_{206} | — | October 27, 2005 | Kitt Peak | Spacewatch | THM | 2.7 km | MPC · JPL |
| 409580 | 2005 UC_{216} | — | October 25, 2005 | Kitt Peak | Spacewatch | · | 2.0 km | MPC · JPL |
| 409581 | 2005 UU_{216} | — | October 26, 2005 | Kitt Peak | Spacewatch | · | 2.1 km | MPC · JPL |
| 409582 | 2005 UM_{223} | — | October 25, 2005 | Kitt Peak | Spacewatch | · | 2.6 km | MPC · JPL |
| 409583 | 2005 UU_{223} | — | October 25, 2005 | Kitt Peak | Spacewatch | · | 2.2 km | MPC · JPL |
| 409584 | 2005 UZ_{228} | — | October 25, 2005 | Kitt Peak | Spacewatch | · | 2.4 km | MPC · JPL |
| 409585 | 2005 UO_{234} | — | October 25, 2005 | Kitt Peak | Spacewatch | HOF | 2.4 km | MPC · JPL |
| 409586 | 2005 UQ_{243} | — | October 25, 2005 | Kitt Peak | Spacewatch | · | 2.6 km | MPC · JPL |
| 409587 | 2005 UJ_{251} | — | October 23, 2005 | Catalina | CSS | · | 2.5 km | MPC · JPL |
| 409588 | 2005 UC_{270} | — | October 28, 2005 | Catalina | CSS | · | 1.7 km | MPC · JPL |
| 409589 | 2005 UD_{270} | — | October 28, 2005 | Catalina | CSS | · | 2.6 km | MPC · JPL |
| 409590 | 2005 UA_{287} | — | October 26, 2005 | Kitt Peak | Spacewatch | · | 2.1 km | MPC · JPL |
| 409591 | 2005 UU_{289} | — | October 1, 1995 | Kitt Peak | Spacewatch | · | 2.1 km | MPC · JPL |
| 409592 | 2005 UG_{291} | — | October 26, 2005 | Kitt Peak | Spacewatch | HOF | 2.8 km | MPC · JPL |
| 409593 | 2005 UK_{295} | — | October 26, 2005 | Kitt Peak | Spacewatch | AGN | 1.4 km | MPC · JPL |
| 409594 | 2005 UA_{307} | — | October 27, 2005 | Mount Lemmon | Mount Lemmon Survey | · | 2.0 km | MPC · JPL |
| 409595 | 2005 UP_{319} | — | October 27, 2005 | Kitt Peak | Spacewatch | · | 2.0 km | MPC · JPL |
| 409596 | 2005 UL_{331} | — | October 12, 2005 | Kitt Peak | Spacewatch | · | 2.1 km | MPC · JPL |
| 409597 | 2005 UC_{352} | — | October 29, 2005 | Catalina | CSS | · | 3.0 km | MPC · JPL |
| 409598 | 2005 UJ_{353} | — | October 29, 2005 | Catalina | CSS | · | 1.7 km | MPC · JPL |
| 409599 | 2005 UB_{361} | — | October 27, 2005 | Kitt Peak | Spacewatch | · | 1.8 km | MPC · JPL |
| 409600 | 2005 UG_{364} | — | October 27, 2005 | Kitt Peak | Spacewatch | · | 1.7 km | MPC · JPL |

== 409601–409700 ==
back to top

| Designation | | | Discovery | | | Properties | | Ref |
| Permanent | Provisional | Named after | Date | Site | Discoverer(s) | Category | Diam. | Ref |
|---|---|---|---|---|---|---|---|---|
| 409601 | 2005 US_{368} | — | October 22, 2005 | Kitt Peak | Spacewatch | · | 2.0 km | MPC · JPL |
| 409602 | 2005 UH_{376} | — | October 27, 2005 | Kitt Peak | Spacewatch | · | 2.3 km | MPC · JPL |
| 409603 | 2005 UU_{385} | — | October 28, 2005 | Mount Lemmon | Mount Lemmon Survey | AST | 1.6 km | MPC · JPL |
| 409604 | 2005 UR_{390} | — | September 24, 2005 | Kitt Peak | Spacewatch | (12739) | 1.8 km | MPC · JPL |
| 409605 | 2005 US_{402} | — | October 28, 2005 | Catalina | CSS | · | 2.5 km | MPC · JPL |
| 409606 | 2005 UZ_{423} | — | October 5, 2005 | Kitt Peak | Spacewatch | · | 2.1 km | MPC · JPL |
| 409607 | 2005 UR_{428} | — | October 28, 2005 | Kitt Peak | Spacewatch | KOR | 1.1 km | MPC · JPL |
| 409608 | 2005 UP_{483} | — | October 22, 2005 | Catalina | CSS | · | 2.3 km | MPC · JPL |
| 409609 | 2005 UZ_{486} | — | October 23, 2005 | Catalina | CSS | EUN | 1.7 km | MPC · JPL |
| 409610 | 2005 UG_{502} | — | October 29, 2005 | Catalina | CSS | · | 2.6 km | MPC · JPL |
| 409611 | 2005 UK_{510} | — | October 25, 2005 | Catalina | CSS | · | 1.8 km | MPC · JPL |
| 409612 | 2005 UZ_{513} | — | October 28, 2005 | Kitt Peak | Spacewatch | AST | 1.5 km | MPC · JPL |
| 409613 | 2005 UC_{523} | — | September 30, 2005 | Mount Lemmon | Mount Lemmon Survey | · | 1.4 km | MPC · JPL |
| 409614 | 2005 VB_{23} | — | November 1, 2005 | Kitt Peak | Spacewatch | KOR | 1.2 km | MPC · JPL |
| 409615 | 2005 VD_{29} | — | October 25, 2005 | Kitt Peak | Spacewatch | GEF | 1.4 km | MPC · JPL |
| 409616 | 2005 VE_{33} | — | November 5, 2005 | Kitt Peak | Spacewatch | GEF | 1.3 km | MPC · JPL |
| 409617 | 2005 VJ_{51} | — | November 3, 2005 | Catalina | CSS | · | 2.2 km | MPC · JPL |
| 409618 | 2005 VN_{96} | — | November 7, 2005 | Socorro | LINEAR | · | 1.8 km | MPC · JPL |
| 409619 | 2005 VO_{117} | — | October 30, 2005 | Kitt Peak | Spacewatch | AGN | 1.2 km | MPC · JPL |
| 409620 | 2005 WN | — | October 25, 2005 | Mount Lemmon | Mount Lemmon Survey | (13314) | 1.6 km | MPC · JPL |
| 409621 | 2005 WH_{5} | — | November 10, 2005 | Catalina | CSS | (18466) | 2.8 km | MPC · JPL |
| 409622 | 2005 WV_{9} | — | November 21, 2005 | Kitt Peak | Spacewatch | INA | 3.6 km | MPC · JPL |
| 409623 | 2005 WU_{13} | — | November 22, 2005 | Kitt Peak | Spacewatch | KOR | 1.2 km | MPC · JPL |
| 409624 | 2005 WX_{14} | — | November 22, 2005 | Kitt Peak | Spacewatch | KOR | 1.4 km | MPC · JPL |
| 409625 | 2005 WG_{43} | — | November 1, 2005 | Mount Lemmon | Mount Lemmon Survey | · | 2.3 km | MPC · JPL |
| 409626 | 2005 WL_{44} | — | November 3, 2005 | Kitt Peak | Spacewatch | · | 1.8 km | MPC · JPL |
| 409627 | 2005 WT_{56} | — | October 25, 2005 | Mount Lemmon | Mount Lemmon Survey | AGN | 1.3 km | MPC · JPL |
| 409628 | 2005 WS_{66} | — | November 22, 2005 | Kitt Peak | Spacewatch | · | 1.6 km | MPC · JPL |
| 409629 | 2005 WA_{67} | — | November 22, 2005 | Kitt Peak | Spacewatch | KOR | 1.4 km | MPC · JPL |
| 409630 | 2005 WH_{116} | — | November 30, 2005 | Socorro | LINEAR | · | 2.4 km | MPC · JPL |
| 409631 | 2005 WV_{126} | — | October 25, 2005 | Catalina | CSS | DOR | 2.1 km | MPC · JPL |
| 409632 | 2005 WW_{142} | — | October 25, 2005 | Mount Lemmon | Mount Lemmon Survey | · | 1.7 km | MPC · JPL |
| 409633 | 2005 WX_{156} | — | November 30, 2005 | Kitt Peak | Spacewatch | · | 2.6 km | MPC · JPL |
| 409634 | 2005 WG_{160} | — | November 30, 2005 | Mount Lemmon | Mount Lemmon Survey | · | 2.2 km | MPC · JPL |
| 409635 | 2005 WJ_{160} | — | November 30, 2005 | Kitt Peak | Spacewatch | NAE | 2.6 km | MPC · JPL |
| 409636 | 2005 WC_{175} | — | November 30, 2005 | Kitt Peak | Spacewatch | · | 1.7 km | MPC · JPL |
| 409637 | 2005 WL_{208} | — | November 28, 2005 | Kitt Peak | Spacewatch | 615 | 1.7 km | MPC · JPL |
| 409638 | 2005 XX_{26} | — | December 4, 2005 | Kitt Peak | Spacewatch | · | 1.6 km | MPC · JPL |
| 409639 | 2005 XH_{27} | — | December 4, 2005 | Kitt Peak | Spacewatch | · | 1.5 km | MPC · JPL |
| 409640 | 2005 XN_{34} | — | December 4, 2005 | Kitt Peak | Spacewatch | · | 2.0 km | MPC · JPL |
| 409641 | 2005 XY_{41} | — | December 2, 2005 | Socorro | LINEAR | · | 2.6 km | MPC · JPL |
| 409642 | 2005 XN_{54} | — | December 5, 2005 | Kitt Peak | Spacewatch | · | 1.7 km | MPC · JPL |
| 409643 | 2005 XP_{64} | — | December 7, 2005 | Kitt Peak | Spacewatch | AGN | 1.4 km | MPC · JPL |
| 409644 | 2005 XC_{70} | — | November 28, 2005 | Kitt Peak | Spacewatch | · | 2.4 km | MPC · JPL |
| 409645 | 2005 XK_{81} | — | December 7, 2005 | Kitt Peak | Spacewatch | · | 1.7 km | MPC · JPL |
| 409646 | 2005 XZ_{91} | — | December 4, 2005 | Socorro | LINEAR | · | 2.0 km | MPC · JPL |
| 409647 | 2005 YK_{2} | — | December 21, 2005 | Kitt Peak | Spacewatch | · | 2.1 km | MPC · JPL |
| 409648 | 2005 YW_{5} | — | December 21, 2005 | Kitt Peak | Spacewatch | · | 2.5 km | MPC · JPL |
| 409649 | 2005 YF_{13} | — | December 22, 2005 | Kitt Peak | Spacewatch | EOS | 2.0 km | MPC · JPL |
| 409650 | 2005 YH_{15} | — | December 22, 2005 | Kitt Peak | Spacewatch | · | 1.6 km | MPC · JPL |
| 409651 | 2005 YA_{25} | — | December 24, 2005 | Kitt Peak | Spacewatch | · | 2.1 km | MPC · JPL |
| 409652 | 2005 YD_{49} | — | December 22, 2005 | Kitt Peak | Spacewatch | · | 570 m | MPC · JPL |
| 409653 | 2005 YM_{50} | — | December 25, 2005 | Kitt Peak | Spacewatch | · | 2.7 km | MPC · JPL |
| 409654 | 2005 YG_{54} | — | December 25, 2005 | Kitt Peak | Spacewatch | · | 1.5 km | MPC · JPL |
| 409655 | 2005 YS_{61} | — | December 2, 2005 | Mount Lemmon | Mount Lemmon Survey | EOS | 1.8 km | MPC · JPL |
| 409656 | 2005 YH_{63} | — | December 24, 2005 | Kitt Peak | Spacewatch | · | 2.8 km | MPC · JPL |
| 409657 | 2005 YX_{95} | — | December 25, 2005 | Kitt Peak | Spacewatch | KOR | 1.5 km | MPC · JPL |
| 409658 | 2005 YH_{107} | — | December 25, 2005 | Mount Lemmon | Mount Lemmon Survey | KOR | 1.2 km | MPC · JPL |
| 409659 | 2005 YE_{117} | — | December 25, 2005 | Kitt Peak | Spacewatch | · | 1.8 km | MPC · JPL |
| 409660 | 2005 YC_{119} | — | December 26, 2005 | Mount Lemmon | Mount Lemmon Survey | MAS | 700 m | MPC · JPL |
| 409661 | 2005 YK_{125} | — | December 5, 2005 | Mount Lemmon | Mount Lemmon Survey | · | 3.0 km | MPC · JPL |
| 409662 | 2005 YV_{129} | — | December 24, 2005 | Kitt Peak | Spacewatch | · | 650 m | MPC · JPL |
| 409663 | 2005 YE_{130} | — | December 24, 2005 | Kitt Peak | Spacewatch | · | 1.8 km | MPC · JPL |
| 409664 | 2005 YG_{136} | — | December 26, 2005 | Kitt Peak | Spacewatch | · | 1.9 km | MPC · JPL |
| 409665 | 2005 YQ_{138} | — | December 26, 2005 | Kitt Peak | Spacewatch | · | 1.5 km | MPC · JPL |
| 409666 | 2005 YY_{151} | — | December 26, 2005 | Kitt Peak | Spacewatch | · | 560 m | MPC · JPL |
| 409667 | 2005 YH_{153} | — | December 29, 2005 | Socorro | LINEAR | · | 3.6 km | MPC · JPL |
| 409668 | 2005 YA_{206} | — | December 27, 2005 | Kitt Peak | Spacewatch | · | 750 m | MPC · JPL |
| 409669 | 2005 YH_{232} | — | December 4, 2005 | Kitt Peak | Spacewatch | KOR | 1.3 km | MPC · JPL |
| 409670 | 2005 YG_{233} | — | December 28, 2005 | Mount Lemmon | Mount Lemmon Survey | KOR | 1.2 km | MPC · JPL |
| 409671 | 2005 YY_{236} | — | December 28, 2005 | Kitt Peak | Spacewatch | · | 1.8 km | MPC · JPL |
| 409672 | 2005 YG_{238} | — | November 29, 2005 | Mount Lemmon | Mount Lemmon Survey | EOS | 2.4 km | MPC · JPL |
| 409673 | 2005 YK_{247} | — | December 30, 2005 | Mount Lemmon | Mount Lemmon Survey | · | 2.2 km | MPC · JPL |
| 409674 | 2005 YJ_{266} | — | October 13, 2005 | Kitt Peak | Spacewatch | · | 2.2 km | MPC · JPL |
| 409675 | 2005 YR_{290} | — | December 30, 2005 | Mount Lemmon | Mount Lemmon Survey | EOS | 2.5 km | MPC · JPL |
| 409676 | 2006 AO_{3} | — | January 5, 2006 | Kitt Peak | Spacewatch | · | 5.3 km | MPC · JPL |
| 409677 | 2006 AW_{10} | — | January 4, 2006 | Kitt Peak | Spacewatch | · | 1.9 km | MPC · JPL |
| 409678 | 2006 AU_{16} | — | December 10, 2005 | Kitt Peak | Spacewatch | BRA | 1.2 km | MPC · JPL |
| 409679 | 2006 AU_{30} | — | January 4, 2006 | Kitt Peak | Spacewatch | EOS | 1.9 km | MPC · JPL |
| 409680 | 2006 AN_{32} | — | December 27, 2005 | Kitt Peak | Spacewatch | EOS | 2.2 km | MPC · JPL |
| 409681 | 2006 AE_{35} | — | December 22, 2005 | Kitt Peak | Spacewatch | EOS | 2.3 km | MPC · JPL |
| 409682 | 2006 AM_{35} | — | January 4, 2006 | Kitt Peak | Spacewatch | · | 2.2 km | MPC · JPL |
| 409683 | 2006 AJ_{48} | — | January 8, 2006 | Mount Lemmon | Mount Lemmon Survey | · | 2.6 km | MPC · JPL |
| 409684 | 2006 AN_{51} | — | November 30, 2005 | Mount Lemmon | Mount Lemmon Survey | · | 2.0 km | MPC · JPL |
| 409685 | 2006 AB_{53} | — | January 5, 2006 | Kitt Peak | Spacewatch | · | 2.1 km | MPC · JPL |
| 409686 | 2006 AE_{54} | — | January 5, 2006 | Kitt Peak | Spacewatch | · | 1.4 km | MPC · JPL |
| 409687 | 2006 AG_{57} | — | December 28, 2005 | Kitt Peak | Spacewatch | · | 2.6 km | MPC · JPL |
| 409688 | 2006 AU_{69} | — | January 6, 2006 | Kitt Peak | Spacewatch | · | 500 m | MPC · JPL |
| 409689 | 2006 AZ_{78} | — | October 1, 2005 | Mount Lemmon | Mount Lemmon Survey | · | 2.5 km | MPC · JPL |
| 409690 | 2006 AU_{84} | — | January 6, 2006 | Anderson Mesa | LONEOS | EUP | 5.0 km | MPC · JPL |
| 409691 | 2006 AH_{94} | — | January 8, 2006 | Kitt Peak | Spacewatch | KOR | 1.4 km | MPC · JPL |
| 409692 | 2006 AD_{101} | — | January 7, 2006 | Mount Lemmon | Mount Lemmon Survey | EOS | 2.2 km | MPC · JPL |
| 409693 | 2006 BQ_{9} | — | January 22, 2006 | Anderson Mesa | LONEOS | · | 3.0 km | MPC · JPL |
| 409694 | 2006 BP_{19} | — | January 8, 2006 | Kitt Peak | Spacewatch | · | 2.2 km | MPC · JPL |
| 409695 | 2006 BW_{22} | — | January 22, 2006 | Mount Lemmon | Mount Lemmon Survey | · | 680 m | MPC · JPL |
| 409696 | 2006 BP_{33} | — | January 21, 2006 | Kitt Peak | Spacewatch | · | 1.0 km | MPC · JPL |
| 409697 | 2006 BN_{37} | — | January 6, 2006 | Kitt Peak | Spacewatch | · | 1.9 km | MPC · JPL |
| 409698 | 2006 BN_{46} | — | January 23, 2006 | Mount Lemmon | Mount Lemmon Survey | · | 2.8 km | MPC · JPL |
| 409699 | 2006 BZ_{53} | — | January 25, 2006 | Kitt Peak | Spacewatch | · | 1.5 km | MPC · JPL |
| 409700 | 2006 BZ_{74} | — | January 23, 2006 | Kitt Peak | Spacewatch | · | 2.5 km | MPC · JPL |

== 409701–409800 ==
back to top

| Designation | | | Discovery | | | Properties | | Ref |
| Permanent | Provisional | Named after | Date | Site | Discoverer(s) | Category | Diam. | Ref |
|---|---|---|---|---|---|---|---|---|
| 409701 | 2006 BM_{98} | — | January 24, 2006 | Saint-Sulpice | B. Christophe | · | 3.0 km | MPC · JPL |
| 409702 | 2006 BX_{107} | — | January 25, 2006 | Kitt Peak | Spacewatch | · | 1.7 km | MPC · JPL |
| 409703 | 2006 BP_{109} | — | January 25, 2006 | Kitt Peak | Spacewatch | · | 3.0 km | MPC · JPL |
| 409704 | 2006 BR_{111} | — | January 25, 2006 | Kitt Peak | Spacewatch | · | 1.5 km | MPC · JPL |
| 409705 | 2006 BS_{121} | — | January 7, 2006 | Mount Lemmon | Mount Lemmon Survey | · | 1.8 km | MPC · JPL |
| 409706 | 2006 BN_{128} | — | January 26, 2006 | Mount Lemmon | Mount Lemmon Survey | · | 710 m | MPC · JPL |
| 409707 | 2006 BO_{131} | — | January 6, 2006 | Mount Lemmon | Mount Lemmon Survey | TIR | 2.9 km | MPC · JPL |
| 409708 | 2006 BN_{144} | — | January 23, 2006 | Catalina | CSS | · | 3.3 km | MPC · JPL |
| 409709 | 2006 BR_{144} | — | January 23, 2006 | Catalina | CSS | · | 3.5 km | MPC · JPL |
| 409710 | 2006 BR_{163} | — | January 26, 2006 | Mount Lemmon | Mount Lemmon Survey | · | 3.0 km | MPC · JPL |
| 409711 | 2006 BU_{167} | — | January 26, 2006 | Mount Lemmon | Mount Lemmon Survey | · | 3.0 km | MPC · JPL |
| 409712 | 2006 BB_{174} | — | January 27, 2006 | Kitt Peak | Spacewatch | EMA | 3.9 km | MPC · JPL |
| 409713 | 2006 BS_{176} | — | January 27, 2006 | Kitt Peak | Spacewatch | · | 3.2 km | MPC · JPL |
| 409714 | 2006 BN_{178} | — | January 10, 2006 | Mount Lemmon | Mount Lemmon Survey | HYG | 2.7 km | MPC · JPL |
| 409715 | 2006 BW_{195} | — | January 30, 2006 | Kitt Peak | Spacewatch | · | 2.6 km | MPC · JPL |
| 409716 | 2006 BP_{204} | — | January 25, 2006 | Kitt Peak | Spacewatch | EOS | 1.9 km | MPC · JPL |
| 409717 | 2006 BG_{205} | — | January 31, 2006 | Kitt Peak | Spacewatch | EOS | 1.9 km | MPC · JPL |
| 409718 | 2006 BV_{225} | — | January 30, 2006 | Kitt Peak | Spacewatch | L5 | 7.9 km | MPC · JPL |
| 409719 | 2006 BP_{254} | — | January 31, 2006 | Kitt Peak | Spacewatch | EOS | 1.9 km | MPC · JPL |
| 409720 | 2006 BK_{255} | — | January 31, 2006 | Kitt Peak | Spacewatch | L5 | 10 km | MPC · JPL |
| 409721 | 2006 BX_{262} | — | January 21, 2006 | Kitt Peak | Spacewatch | · | 3.9 km | MPC · JPL |
| 409722 | 2006 BM_{263} | — | January 31, 2006 | Kitt Peak | Spacewatch | · | 690 m | MPC · JPL |
| 409723 | 2006 BO_{277} | — | January 25, 2006 | Kitt Peak | Spacewatch | · | 2.9 km | MPC · JPL |
| 409724 | 2006 BP_{280} | — | January 31, 2006 | Kitt Peak | Spacewatch | · | 2.4 km | MPC · JPL |
| 409725 | 2006 BQ_{280} | — | January 31, 2006 | Kitt Peak | Spacewatch | · | 2.7 km | MPC · JPL |
| 409726 | 2006 BV_{280} | — | January 23, 2006 | Kitt Peak | Spacewatch | · | 690 m | MPC · JPL |
| 409727 | 2006 BM_{283} | — | January 22, 2006 | Mount Lemmon | Mount Lemmon Survey | · | 2.4 km | MPC · JPL |
| 409728 | 2006 CZ_{18} | — | February 1, 2006 | Catalina | CSS | URS | 4.7 km | MPC · JPL |
| 409729 | 2006 CG_{22} | — | February 1, 2006 | Kitt Peak | Spacewatch | · | 620 m | MPC · JPL |
| 409730 | 2006 CH_{24} | — | February 2, 2006 | Kitt Peak | Spacewatch | · | 520 m | MPC · JPL |
| 409731 | 2006 CQ_{26} | — | February 2, 2006 | Kitt Peak | Spacewatch | VER | 3.5 km | MPC · JPL |
| 409732 | 2006 CM_{27} | — | January 24, 2006 | Kitt Peak | Spacewatch | · | 610 m | MPC · JPL |
| 409733 | 2006 CY_{39} | — | February 2, 2006 | Mount Lemmon | Mount Lemmon Survey | · | 2.2 km | MPC · JPL |
| 409734 | 2006 CS_{45} | — | January 23, 2006 | Kitt Peak | Spacewatch | · | 1.7 km | MPC · JPL |
| 409735 | 2006 CE_{46} | — | January 25, 2006 | Kitt Peak | Spacewatch | · | 2.9 km | MPC · JPL |
| 409736 | 2006 CB_{53} | — | January 22, 2006 | Mount Lemmon | Mount Lemmon Survey | · | 3.0 km | MPC · JPL |
| 409737 | 2006 CC_{53} | — | February 4, 2006 | Kitt Peak | Spacewatch | · | 3.2 km | MPC · JPL |
| 409738 | 2006 CD_{56} | — | February 4, 2006 | Catalina | CSS | PHO | 2.5 km | MPC · JPL |
| 409739 | 2006 DC_{16} | — | February 20, 2006 | Kitt Peak | Spacewatch | · | 670 m | MPC · JPL |
| 409740 | 2006 DS_{18} | — | February 1, 2006 | Kitt Peak | Spacewatch | THM | 2.2 km | MPC · JPL |
| 409741 | 2006 DD_{22} | — | February 20, 2006 | Kitt Peak | Spacewatch | · | 760 m | MPC · JPL |
| 409742 | 2006 DZ_{23} | — | February 20, 2006 | Kitt Peak | Spacewatch | · | 680 m | MPC · JPL |
| 409743 | 2006 DP_{25} | — | January 26, 2006 | Kitt Peak | Spacewatch | · | 2.1 km | MPC · JPL |
| 409744 | 2006 DW_{28} | — | February 20, 2006 | Kitt Peak | Spacewatch | · | 2.9 km | MPC · JPL |
| 409745 | 2006 DB_{35} | — | February 20, 2006 | Kitt Peak | Spacewatch | · | 2.5 km | MPC · JPL |
| 409746 | 2006 DL_{44} | — | February 20, 2006 | Catalina | CSS | · | 2.4 km | MPC · JPL |
| 409747 | 2006 DO_{57} | — | January 23, 2006 | Mount Lemmon | Mount Lemmon Survey | · | 2.7 km | MPC · JPL |
| 409748 | 2006 DS_{58} | — | February 24, 2006 | Kitt Peak | Spacewatch | · | 650 m | MPC · JPL |
| 409749 | 2006 DL_{61} | — | February 24, 2006 | Mount Lemmon | Mount Lemmon Survey | · | 830 m | MPC · JPL |
| 409750 | 2006 DD_{62} | — | February 22, 2006 | Anderson Mesa | LONEOS | · | 3.9 km | MPC · JPL |
| 409751 | 2006 DH_{62} | — | January 28, 2006 | Catalina | CSS | PHO | 1.2 km | MPC · JPL |
| 409752 | 2006 DM_{64} | — | November 4, 2005 | Kitt Peak | Spacewatch | · | 2.3 km | MPC · JPL |
| 409753 | 2006 DV_{74} | — | February 4, 2006 | Kitt Peak | Spacewatch | THM | 2.1 km | MPC · JPL |
| 409754 | 2006 DN_{78} | — | February 24, 2006 | Kitt Peak | Spacewatch | · | 4.1 km | MPC · JPL |
| 409755 | 2006 DW_{85} | — | February 24, 2006 | Kitt Peak | Spacewatch | · | 950 m | MPC · JPL |
| 409756 | 2006 DS_{86} | — | February 24, 2006 | Kitt Peak | Spacewatch | · | 3.8 km | MPC · JPL |
| 409757 | 2006 DJ_{90} | — | February 24, 2006 | Kitt Peak | Spacewatch | · | 520 m | MPC · JPL |
| 409758 | 2006 DD_{93} | — | February 24, 2006 | Kitt Peak | Spacewatch | · | 2.5 km | MPC · JPL |
| 409759 | 2006 DT_{93} | — | February 24, 2006 | Kitt Peak | Spacewatch | · | 2.8 km | MPC · JPL |
| 409760 | 2006 DV_{93} | — | February 24, 2006 | Kitt Peak | Spacewatch | · | 860 m | MPC · JPL |
| 409761 | 2006 DO_{95} | — | February 24, 2006 | Kitt Peak | Spacewatch | · | 4.6 km | MPC · JPL |
| 409762 | 2006 DA_{100} | — | February 25, 2006 | Kitt Peak | Spacewatch | · | 670 m | MPC · JPL |
| 409763 | 2006 DH_{100} | — | January 23, 2006 | Kitt Peak | Spacewatch | EOS | 2.1 km | MPC · JPL |
| 409764 | 2006 DO_{101} | — | February 25, 2006 | Kitt Peak | Spacewatch | · | 2.1 km | MPC · JPL |
| 409765 | 2006 DE_{141} | — | February 25, 2006 | Kitt Peak | Spacewatch | · | 730 m | MPC · JPL |
| 409766 | 2006 DJ_{142} | — | December 10, 2005 | Kitt Peak | Spacewatch | · | 3.0 km | MPC · JPL |
| 409767 | 2006 DB_{151} | — | February 25, 2006 | Kitt Peak | Spacewatch | · | 700 m | MPC · JPL |
| 409768 | 2006 DV_{160} | — | February 27, 2006 | Kitt Peak | Spacewatch | · | 690 m | MPC · JPL |
| 409769 | 2006 DE_{161} | — | February 27, 2006 | Kitt Peak | Spacewatch | EOS | 2.3 km | MPC · JPL |
| 409770 | 2006 DB_{175} | — | February 27, 2006 | Kitt Peak | Spacewatch | · | 2.1 km | MPC · JPL |
| 409771 | 2006 DC_{182} | — | February 27, 2006 | Mount Lemmon | Mount Lemmon Survey | · | 660 m | MPC · JPL |
| 409772 | 2006 DJ_{189} | — | February 27, 2006 | Kitt Peak | Spacewatch | · | 690 m | MPC · JPL |
| 409773 | 2006 DZ_{209} | — | February 20, 2006 | Kitt Peak | Spacewatch | · | 1.8 km | MPC · JPL |
| 409774 | 2006 ED_{5} | — | March 2, 2006 | Kitt Peak | Spacewatch | · | 1.6 km | MPC · JPL |
| 409775 | 2006 EU_{10} | — | March 2, 2006 | Kitt Peak | Spacewatch | · | 2.8 km | MPC · JPL |
| 409776 | 2006 EX_{26} | — | March 3, 2006 | Kitt Peak | Spacewatch | · | 630 m | MPC · JPL |
| 409777 | 2006 EN_{30} | — | March 3, 2006 | Kitt Peak | Spacewatch | · | 2.6 km | MPC · JPL |
| 409778 | 2006 EF_{37} | — | March 3, 2006 | Kitt Peak | Spacewatch | · | 690 m | MPC · JPL |
| 409779 | 2006 EC_{41} | — | March 4, 2006 | Kitt Peak | Spacewatch | · | 800 m | MPC · JPL |
| 409780 | 2006 EA_{42} | — | March 4, 2006 | Catalina | CSS | · | 3.6 km | MPC · JPL |
| 409781 | 2006 EL_{42} | — | March 4, 2006 | Kitt Peak | Spacewatch | VER | 2.9 km | MPC · JPL |
| 409782 | 2006 EL_{57} | — | March 5, 2006 | Kitt Peak | Spacewatch | · | 2.3 km | MPC · JPL |
| 409783 | 2006 EQ_{62} | — | March 5, 2006 | Kitt Peak | Spacewatch | · | 2.6 km | MPC · JPL |
| 409784 | 2006 FP_{3} | — | March 23, 2006 | Kitt Peak | Spacewatch | · | 650 m | MPC · JPL |
| 409785 | 2006 FH_{7} | — | March 23, 2006 | Kitt Peak | Spacewatch | · | 3.3 km | MPC · JPL |
| 409786 | 2006 FU_{11} | — | March 23, 2006 | Kitt Peak | Spacewatch | · | 690 m | MPC · JPL |
| 409787 | 2006 FE_{18} | — | March 23, 2006 | Kitt Peak | Spacewatch | · | 720 m | MPC · JPL |
| 409788 | 2006 FP_{29} | — | March 24, 2006 | Mount Lemmon | Mount Lemmon Survey | · | 3.3 km | MPC · JPL |
| 409789 | 2006 FL_{32} | — | March 25, 2006 | Mount Lemmon | Mount Lemmon Survey | · | 3.8 km | MPC · JPL |
| 409790 | 2006 FR_{53} | — | March 25, 2006 | Kitt Peak | Spacewatch | NYS | 930 m | MPC · JPL |
| 409791 | 2006 FT_{54} | — | March 23, 2006 | Kitt Peak | Spacewatch | · | 2.9 km | MPC · JPL |
| 409792 | 2006 FW_{54} | — | March 26, 2006 | Kitt Peak | Spacewatch | · | 1.0 km | MPC · JPL |
| 409793 | 2006 FG_{55} | — | March 24, 2006 | Mount Lemmon | Mount Lemmon Survey | · | 3.4 km | MPC · JPL |
| 409794 | 2006 GO_{14} | — | March 23, 2006 | Kitt Peak | Spacewatch | · | 1.2 km | MPC · JPL |
| 409795 | 2006 GM_{25} | — | April 2, 2006 | Kitt Peak | Spacewatch | · | 3.5 km | MPC · JPL |
| 409796 | 2006 GV_{34} | — | April 7, 2006 | Catalina | CSS | · | 3.7 km | MPC · JPL |
| 409797 | 2006 GC_{36} | — | March 2, 2006 | Kitt Peak | Spacewatch | THM | 1.9 km | MPC · JPL |
| 409798 | 2006 GU_{50} | — | April 2, 2006 | Anderson Mesa | LONEOS | · | 3.9 km | MPC · JPL |
| 409799 | 2006 HQ_{28} | — | April 20, 2006 | Kitt Peak | Spacewatch | · | 1.3 km | MPC · JPL |
| 409800 | 2006 HP_{29} | — | April 23, 2006 | Socorro | LINEAR | · | 1.6 km | MPC · JPL |

== 409801–409900 ==
back to top

| Designation | | | Discovery | | | Properties | | Ref |
| Permanent | Provisional | Named after | Date | Site | Discoverer(s) | Category | Diam. | Ref |
|---|---|---|---|---|---|---|---|---|
| 409801 | 2006 HS_{33} | — | April 19, 2006 | Mount Lemmon | Mount Lemmon Survey | · | 920 m | MPC · JPL |
| 409802 | 2006 HN_{44} | — | April 24, 2006 | Mount Lemmon | Mount Lemmon Survey | · | 770 m | MPC · JPL |
| 409803 | 2006 HL_{47} | — | April 24, 2006 | Kitt Peak | Spacewatch | · | 700 m | MPC · JPL |
| 409804 | 2006 HC_{50} | — | April 26, 2006 | Kitt Peak | Spacewatch | · | 980 m | MPC · JPL |
| 409805 | 2006 HH_{53} | — | April 19, 2006 | Catalina | CSS | V | 890 m | MPC · JPL |
| 409806 | 2006 HM_{65} | — | April 24, 2006 | Kitt Peak | Spacewatch | V | 620 m | MPC · JPL |
| 409807 | 2006 HM_{78} | — | March 24, 2006 | Mount Lemmon | Mount Lemmon Survey | · | 670 m | MPC · JPL |
| 409808 | 2006 HX_{78} | — | April 26, 2006 | Kitt Peak | Spacewatch | · | 1.0 km | MPC · JPL |
| 409809 | 2006 HU_{81} | — | April 26, 2006 | Kitt Peak | Spacewatch | · | 940 m | MPC · JPL |
| 409810 | 2006 HQ_{91} | — | April 25, 2006 | Kitt Peak | Spacewatch | · | 1.2 km | MPC · JPL |
| 409811 | 2006 HF_{98} | — | April 30, 2006 | Kitt Peak | Spacewatch | · | 3.8 km | MPC · JPL |
| 409812 | 2006 HX_{98} | — | April 30, 2006 | Kitt Peak | Spacewatch | · | 3.0 km | MPC · JPL |
| 409813 | 2006 HW_{135} | — | April 26, 2006 | Cerro Tololo | M. W. Buie | · | 2.9 km | MPC · JPL |
| 409814 | 2006 JP_{14} | — | May 1, 2006 | Kitt Peak | Spacewatch | · | 3.0 km | MPC · JPL |
| 409815 | 2006 JL_{15} | — | May 2, 2006 | Mount Lemmon | Mount Lemmon Survey | · | 2.8 km | MPC · JPL |
| 409816 | 2006 JN_{15} | — | May 2, 2006 | Mount Lemmon | Mount Lemmon Survey | · | 850 m | MPC · JPL |
| 409817 | 2006 JJ_{16} | — | May 2, 2006 | Kitt Peak | Spacewatch | V | 630 m | MPC · JPL |
| 409818 | 2006 JX_{35} | — | May 4, 2006 | Kitt Peak | Spacewatch | · | 1.7 km | MPC · JPL |
| 409819 | 2006 JN_{66} | — | May 1, 2006 | Kitt Peak | M. W. Buie | THM | 2.7 km | MPC · JPL |
| 409820 | 2006 KD_{10} | — | May 19, 2006 | Mount Lemmon | Mount Lemmon Survey | · | 900 m | MPC · JPL |
| 409821 | 2006 KK_{12} | — | January 16, 2005 | Kitt Peak | Spacewatch | EOS | 2.2 km | MPC · JPL |
| 409822 | 2006 KV_{32} | — | May 20, 2006 | Kitt Peak | Spacewatch | · | 910 m | MPC · JPL |
| 409823 | 2006 KN_{37} | — | May 22, 2006 | Kitt Peak | Spacewatch | · | 4.0 km | MPC · JPL |
| 409824 | 2006 KK_{53} | — | May 7, 2006 | Mount Lemmon | Mount Lemmon Survey | · | 3.2 km | MPC · JPL |
| 409825 | 2006 KL_{60} | — | May 22, 2006 | Kitt Peak | Spacewatch | THB | 3.2 km | MPC · JPL |
| 409826 | 2006 KN_{118} | — | May 20, 2006 | Kitt Peak | Spacewatch | · | 1.1 km | MPC · JPL |
| 409827 | 2006 KB_{124} | — | May 21, 2006 | Kitt Peak | Spacewatch | H | 390 m | MPC · JPL |
| 409828 | 2006 LJ_{1} | — | June 1, 2006 | Kitt Peak | Spacewatch | LUT | 5.3 km | MPC · JPL |
| 409829 | 2006 OX_{21} | — | July 31, 2006 | Siding Spring | SSS | · | 1.3 km | MPC · JPL |
| 409830 | 2006 PH_{5} | — | July 31, 2006 | Siding Spring | SSS | · | 1.3 km | MPC · JPL |
| 409831 | 2006 QL_{13} | — | August 16, 2006 | Lulin | Lin, C.-S., Q. Ye | H | 650 m | MPC · JPL |
| 409832 | 2006 QQ_{32} | — | August 21, 2006 | Kitt Peak | Spacewatch | T_{j} (2.98) · 3:2 | 7.3 km | MPC · JPL |
| 409833 | 2006 QH_{48} | — | August 21, 2006 | Kitt Peak | Spacewatch | NYS | 1.3 km | MPC · JPL |
| 409834 | 2006 QS_{66} | — | November 23, 1995 | Kitt Peak | Spacewatch | · | 1.5 km | MPC · JPL |
| 409835 | 2006 QF_{103} | — | August 27, 2006 | Kitt Peak | Spacewatch | · | 740 m | MPC · JPL |
| 409836 | 2006 QY_{110} | — | August 30, 2006 | Socorro | LINEAR | APO +1km · PHA | 550 m | MPC · JPL |
| 409837 | 2006 QO_{131} | — | July 18, 2006 | Mount Lemmon | Mount Lemmon Survey | PHO | 920 m | MPC · JPL |
| 409838 | 2006 QT_{137} | — | August 16, 2006 | Palomar | NEAT | · | 1.2 km | MPC · JPL |
| 409839 | 2006 QQ_{167} | — | August 30, 2006 | Anderson Mesa | LONEOS | PHO | 860 m | MPC · JPL |
| 409840 | 2006 QN_{184} | — | August 19, 2006 | Kitt Peak | Spacewatch | · | 990 m | MPC · JPL |
| 409841 | 2006 RZ_{23} | — | September 13, 2006 | Palomar | NEAT | T_{j} (2.98) · 3:2 | 6.1 km | MPC · JPL |
| 409842 | 2006 RL_{49} | — | September 14, 2006 | Kitt Peak | Spacewatch | · | 1.6 km | MPC · JPL |
| 409843 | 2006 RG_{50} | — | September 14, 2006 | Kitt Peak | Spacewatch | KON | 2.0 km | MPC · JPL |
| 409844 | 2006 RZ_{57} | — | September 15, 2006 | Kitt Peak | Spacewatch | · | 1.2 km | MPC · JPL |
| 409845 | 2006 SR_{29} | — | September 17, 2006 | Kitt Peak | Spacewatch | · | 1.4 km | MPC · JPL |
| 409846 | 2006 SZ_{41} | — | August 28, 2006 | Anderson Mesa | LONEOS | JUN | 1.3 km | MPC · JPL |
| 409847 | 2006 SJ_{67} | — | September 19, 2006 | Kitt Peak | Spacewatch | 3:2 | 5.4 km | MPC · JPL |
| 409848 | 2006 SA_{70} | — | September 19, 2006 | Kitt Peak | Spacewatch | · | 1.0 km | MPC · JPL |
| 409849 | 2006 SM_{78} | — | September 17, 2006 | Kitt Peak | Spacewatch | · | 1.0 km | MPC · JPL |
| 409850 | 2006 SZ_{79} | — | September 18, 2006 | Kitt Peak | Spacewatch | H | 500 m | MPC · JPL |
| 409851 | 2006 SU_{83} | — | September 18, 2006 | Kitt Peak | Spacewatch | · | 1.2 km | MPC · JPL |
| 409852 | 2006 SF_{84} | — | September 18, 2006 | Kitt Peak | Spacewatch | EUN | 1.2 km | MPC · JPL |
| 409853 | 2006 SX_{118} | — | September 18, 2006 | Catalina | CSS | H | 610 m | MPC · JPL |
| 409854 | 2006 SN_{119} | — | September 18, 2006 | Catalina | CSS | T_{j} (2.99) · 3:2 | 5.8 km | MPC · JPL |
| 409855 | 2006 SF_{122} | — | September 19, 2006 | Catalina | CSS | H | 600 m | MPC · JPL |
| 409856 | 2006 SV_{122} | — | September 19, 2006 | Catalina | CSS | T_{j} (2.97) · 3:2 | 5.8 km | MPC · JPL |
| 409857 | 2006 SY_{123} | — | September 19, 2006 | Catalina | CSS | H | 560 m | MPC · JPL |
| 409858 | 2006 SL_{129} | — | September 18, 2006 | Anderson Mesa | LONEOS | H | 620 m | MPC · JPL |
| 409859 | 2006 SA_{131} | — | September 24, 2006 | Calvin-Rehoboth | L. A. Molnar | · | 830 m | MPC · JPL |
| 409860 | 2006 SD_{135} | — | September 20, 2006 | Palomar | NEAT | · | 1.4 km | MPC · JPL |
| 409861 | 2006 SW_{145} | — | September 19, 2006 | Kitt Peak | Spacewatch | · | 1.2 km | MPC · JPL |
| 409862 | 2006 SL_{179} | — | September 14, 2006 | Kitt Peak | Spacewatch | · | 1.2 km | MPC · JPL |
| 409863 | 2006 SU_{185} | — | September 25, 2006 | Mount Lemmon | Mount Lemmon Survey | · | 1.5 km | MPC · JPL |
| 409864 | 2006 SJ_{189} | — | September 26, 2006 | Kitt Peak | Spacewatch | · | 520 m | MPC · JPL |
| 409865 | 2006 SQ_{196} | — | September 26, 2006 | Kitt Peak | Spacewatch | H | 510 m | MPC · JPL |
| 409866 | 2006 SY_{218} | — | September 18, 2006 | Catalina | CSS | · | 1.5 km | MPC · JPL |
| 409867 | 2006 SE_{222} | — | September 25, 2006 | Kitt Peak | Spacewatch | · | 1.1 km | MPC · JPL |
| 409868 | 2006 SD_{224} | — | September 25, 2006 | Mount Lemmon | Mount Lemmon Survey | · | 930 m | MPC · JPL |
| 409869 | 2006 SD_{231} | — | September 26, 2006 | Kitt Peak | Spacewatch | · | 1.2 km | MPC · JPL |
| 409870 | 2006 SY_{235} | — | September 26, 2006 | Catalina | CSS | · | 1.2 km | MPC · JPL |
| 409871 | 2006 SV_{254} | — | September 26, 2006 | Mount Lemmon | Mount Lemmon Survey | ADE | 1.6 km | MPC · JPL |
| 409872 | 2006 SY_{254} | — | September 26, 2006 | Mount Lemmon | Mount Lemmon Survey | 3:2 | 4.9 km | MPC · JPL |
| 409873 | 2006 SX_{260} | — | September 26, 2006 | Kitt Peak | Spacewatch | · | 920 m | MPC · JPL |
| 409874 | 2006 SJ_{267} | — | September 26, 2006 | Kitt Peak | Spacewatch | MAR | 1.0 km | MPC · JPL |
| 409875 | 2006 SW_{270} | — | September 27, 2006 | Anderson Mesa | LONEOS | H | 490 m | MPC · JPL |
| 409876 | 2006 SK_{286} | — | September 19, 2006 | Catalina | CSS | · | 760 m | MPC · JPL |
| 409877 | 2006 SC_{290} | — | September 29, 2006 | Anderson Mesa | LONEOS | H | 530 m | MPC · JPL |
| 409878 | 2006 SH_{295} | — | September 17, 2006 | Kitt Peak | Spacewatch | · | 1.4 km | MPC · JPL |
| 409879 | 2006 SB_{296} | — | September 17, 2006 | Kitt Peak | Spacewatch | · | 730 m | MPC · JPL |
| 409880 | 2006 SU_{301} | — | September 26, 2006 | Mount Lemmon | Mount Lemmon Survey | T_{j} (2.99) · 3:2 · SHU | 6.2 km | MPC · JPL |
| 409881 | 2006 SP_{326} | — | September 27, 2006 | Kitt Peak | Spacewatch | · | 1.1 km | MPC · JPL |
| 409882 | 2006 SO_{339} | — | September 28, 2006 | Kitt Peak | Spacewatch | 3:2 | 6.5 km | MPC · JPL |
| 409883 | 2006 SC_{349} | — | September 28, 2006 | Catalina | CSS | H | 720 m | MPC · JPL |
| 409884 | 2006 SG_{355} | — | September 30, 2006 | Mount Lemmon | Mount Lemmon Survey | · | 3.6 km | MPC · JPL |
| 409885 | 2006 SV_{356} | — | September 30, 2006 | Catalina | CSS | H | 620 m | MPC · JPL |
| 409886 | 2006 SN_{364} | — | September 28, 2006 | Mount Lemmon | Mount Lemmon Survey | · | 1.4 km | MPC · JPL |
| 409887 | 2006 ST_{364} | — | September 28, 2006 | Mount Lemmon | Mount Lemmon Survey | (5) | 1.5 km | MPC · JPL |
| 409888 | 2006 SH_{366} | — | September 30, 2006 | Mount Lemmon | Mount Lemmon Survey | · | 1.6 km | MPC · JPL |
| 409889 | 2006 SV_{393} | — | September 30, 2006 | Catalina | CSS | · | 1.2 km | MPC · JPL |
| 409890 | 2006 SZ_{393} | — | September 30, 2006 | Mount Lemmon | Mount Lemmon Survey | ADE | 2.0 km | MPC · JPL |
| 409891 | 2006 SG_{394} | — | September 30, 2006 | Mount Lemmon | Mount Lemmon Survey | · | 1.2 km | MPC · JPL |
| 409892 | 2006 SY_{401} | — | September 26, 2006 | Mount Lemmon | Mount Lemmon Survey | · | 1.6 km | MPC · JPL |
| 409893 | 2006 SP_{403} | — | September 27, 2006 | Mount Lemmon | Mount Lemmon Survey | EUN | 1.2 km | MPC · JPL |
| 409894 | 2006 SR_{403} | — | September 28, 2006 | Mount Lemmon | Mount Lemmon Survey | · | 1.0 km | MPC · JPL |
| 409895 | 2006 SE_{404} | — | September 30, 2006 | Mount Lemmon | Mount Lemmon Survey | · | 1.9 km | MPC · JPL |
| 409896 | 2006 SF_{405} | — | September 28, 2006 | Mount Lemmon | Mount Lemmon Survey | · | 4.0 km | MPC · JPL |
| 409897 | 2006 SY_{407} | — | September 25, 2006 | Mount Lemmon | Mount Lemmon Survey | EUN | 1.1 km | MPC · JPL |
| 409898 | 2006 SA_{409} | — | September 27, 2006 | Mount Lemmon | Mount Lemmon Survey | H | 620 m | MPC · JPL |
| 409899 | 2006 SS_{412} | — | September 30, 2006 | Catalina | CSS | · | 1.5 km | MPC · JPL |
| 409900 | 2006 TX_{6} | — | October 3, 2006 | Mount Lemmon | Mount Lemmon Survey | · | 870 m | MPC · JPL |

== 409901–410000 ==
back to top

| Designation | | | Discovery | | | Properties | | Ref |
| Permanent | Provisional | Named after | Date | Site | Discoverer(s) | Category | Diam. | Ref |
|---|---|---|---|---|---|---|---|---|
| 409901 | 2006 TL_{8} | — | October 4, 2006 | Mount Lemmon | Mount Lemmon Survey | · | 980 m | MPC · JPL |
| 409902 | 2006 TX_{11} | — | October 15, 2006 | Piszkéstető | K. Sárneczky, Kuli, Z. | · | 990 m | MPC · JPL |
| 409903 | 2006 TQ_{12} | — | September 17, 2006 | Kitt Peak | Spacewatch | H | 570 m | MPC · JPL |
| 409904 | 2006 TN_{26} | — | October 12, 2006 | Kitt Peak | Spacewatch | · | 800 m | MPC · JPL |
| 409905 | 2006 TA_{29} | — | October 12, 2006 | Kitt Peak | Spacewatch | (5) | 1.0 km | MPC · JPL |
| 409906 | 2006 TE_{35} | — | October 12, 2006 | Kitt Peak | Spacewatch | · | 600 m | MPC · JPL |
| 409907 | 2006 TW_{36} | — | October 3, 2006 | Mount Lemmon | Mount Lemmon Survey | (5) | 970 m | MPC · JPL |
| 409908 | 2006 TF_{40} | — | October 12, 2006 | Kitt Peak | Spacewatch | · | 2.9 km | MPC · JPL |
| 409909 | 2006 TN_{41} | — | October 12, 2006 | Palomar | NEAT | (5) | 950 m | MPC · JPL |
| 409910 | 2006 TP_{43} | — | October 12, 2006 | Kitt Peak | Spacewatch | · | 1.4 km | MPC · JPL |
| 409911 | 2006 TX_{43} | — | October 12, 2006 | Kitt Peak | Spacewatch | · | 1.8 km | MPC · JPL |
| 409912 | 2006 TP_{52} | — | September 28, 2006 | Mount Lemmon | Mount Lemmon Survey | · | 870 m | MPC · JPL |
| 409913 | 2006 TY_{52} | — | October 12, 2006 | Kitt Peak | Spacewatch | · | 850 m | MPC · JPL |
| 409914 | 2006 TZ_{73} | — | October 11, 2006 | Palomar | NEAT | · | 1.2 km | MPC · JPL |
| 409915 | 2006 TN_{74} | — | October 11, 2006 | Palomar | NEAT | · | 1.0 km | MPC · JPL |
| 409916 | 2006 TF_{81} | — | October 13, 2006 | Kitt Peak | Spacewatch | · | 1.6 km | MPC · JPL |
| 409917 | 2006 TM_{81} | — | October 13, 2006 | Kitt Peak | Spacewatch | · | 660 m | MPC · JPL |
| 409918 | 2006 TD_{88} | — | October 13, 2006 | Kitt Peak | Spacewatch | · | 1 km | MPC · JPL |
| 409919 | 2006 TE_{89} | — | September 30, 2006 | Mount Lemmon | Mount Lemmon Survey | (5) | 1.0 km | MPC · JPL |
| 409920 | 2006 TA_{90} | — | October 13, 2006 | Kitt Peak | Spacewatch | · | 1.6 km | MPC · JPL |
| 409921 | 2006 TF_{94} | — | October 15, 2006 | Catalina | CSS | 3:2 | 5.1 km | MPC · JPL |
| 409922 | 2006 TB_{97} | — | October 12, 2006 | Kitt Peak | Spacewatch | · | 1.1 km | MPC · JPL |
| 409923 | 2006 TV_{98} | — | October 15, 2006 | Kitt Peak | Spacewatch | · | 790 m | MPC · JPL |
| 409924 | 2006 TK_{116} | — | October 2, 2006 | Apache Point | A. C. Becker | · | 1.1 km | MPC · JPL |
| 409925 | 2006 TQ_{123} | — | October 2, 2006 | Mount Lemmon | Mount Lemmon Survey | · | 1.2 km | MPC · JPL |
| 409926 | 2006 UD_{3} | — | October 16, 2006 | Catalina | CSS | · | 1.2 km | MPC · JPL |
| 409927 | 2006 UY_{8} | — | October 16, 2006 | Catalina | CSS | · | 1.3 km | MPC · JPL |
| 409928 | 2006 UZ_{18} | — | October 16, 2006 | Kitt Peak | Spacewatch | · | 920 m | MPC · JPL |
| 409929 | 2006 UJ_{29} | — | September 25, 2006 | Kitt Peak | Spacewatch | · | 1.1 km | MPC · JPL |
| 409930 | 2006 UP_{36} | — | October 16, 2006 | Kitt Peak | Spacewatch | · | 1.2 km | MPC · JPL |
| 409931 | 2006 UX_{38} | — | October 16, 2006 | Kitt Peak | Spacewatch | · | 1.2 km | MPC · JPL |
| 409932 | 2006 UZ_{52} | — | October 17, 2006 | Mount Lemmon | Mount Lemmon Survey | · | 1.4 km | MPC · JPL |
| 409933 | 2006 UT_{53} | — | September 28, 2006 | Mount Lemmon | Mount Lemmon Survey | · | 1 km | MPC · JPL |
| 409934 | 2006 UG_{64} | — | October 23, 2006 | Siding Spring | SSS | AMO | 680 m | MPC · JPL |
| 409935 | 2006 UJ_{64} | — | October 23, 2006 | Kitami | K. Endate | T_{j} (2.96) · 3:2 | 6.0 km | MPC · JPL |
| 409936 | 2006 UN_{67} | — | October 16, 2006 | Catalina | CSS | · | 790 m | MPC · JPL |
| 409937 | 2006 UJ_{69} | — | October 16, 2006 | Catalina | CSS | · | 3.1 km | MPC · JPL |
| 409938 | 2006 UF_{78} | — | October 17, 2006 | Kitt Peak | Spacewatch | · | 780 m | MPC · JPL |
| 409939 | 2006 UD_{79} | — | October 17, 2006 | Kitt Peak | Spacewatch | (5) | 1.1 km | MPC · JPL |
| 409940 | 2006 UJ_{88} | — | September 30, 2006 | Mount Lemmon | Mount Lemmon Survey | · | 790 m | MPC · JPL |
| 409941 | 2006 UC_{106} | — | October 18, 2006 | Kitt Peak | Spacewatch | · | 1.0 km | MPC · JPL |
| 409942 | 2006 UA_{113} | — | September 14, 2006 | Kitt Peak | Spacewatch | · | 810 m | MPC · JPL |
| 409943 | 2006 UZ_{123} | — | October 19, 2006 | Kitt Peak | Spacewatch | 3:2 · SHU | 4.8 km | MPC · JPL |
| 409944 | 2006 UN_{139} | — | October 19, 2006 | Mount Lemmon | Mount Lemmon Survey | · | 1.2 km | MPC · JPL |
| 409945 | 2006 UL_{151} | — | October 20, 2006 | Mount Lemmon | Mount Lemmon Survey | · | 1.6 km | MPC · JPL |
| 409946 | 2006 UC_{167} | — | October 2, 2006 | Mount Lemmon | Mount Lemmon Survey | · | 990 m | MPC · JPL |
| 409947 | 2006 UT_{171} | — | October 21, 2006 | Mount Lemmon | Mount Lemmon Survey | · | 1.0 km | MPC · JPL |
| 409948 | 2006 UA_{195} | — | October 20, 2006 | Kitt Peak | Spacewatch | 3:2 | 5.6 km | MPC · JPL |
| 409949 | 2006 UV_{197} | — | October 20, 2006 | Kitt Peak | Spacewatch | · | 1.1 km | MPC · JPL |
| 409950 | 2006 UC_{201} | — | October 21, 2006 | Kitt Peak | Spacewatch | EUN | 890 m | MPC · JPL |
| 409951 | 2006 UW_{203} | — | October 22, 2006 | Palomar | NEAT | · | 1.4 km | MPC · JPL |
| 409952 | 2006 UT_{212} | — | October 23, 2006 | Kitt Peak | Spacewatch | · | 1.1 km | MPC · JPL |
| 409953 | 2006 UU_{213} | — | October 23, 2006 | Kitt Peak | Spacewatch | · | 1.1 km | MPC · JPL |
| 409954 | 2006 UW_{214} | — | October 28, 2006 | Socorro | LINEAR | H | 720 m | MPC · JPL |
| 409955 | 2006 UK_{232} | — | October 21, 2006 | Palomar | NEAT | H | 640 m | MPC · JPL |
| 409956 | 2006 UX_{251} | — | September 25, 2006 | Mount Lemmon | Mount Lemmon Survey | · | 870 m | MPC · JPL |
| 409957 | 2006 UM_{260} | — | October 28, 2006 | Mount Lemmon | Mount Lemmon Survey | · | 1.0 km | MPC · JPL |
| 409958 | 2006 UO_{264} | — | October 27, 2006 | Kitt Peak | Spacewatch | (5) | 1.1 km | MPC · JPL |
| 409959 | 2006 UF_{271} | — | October 27, 2006 | Kitt Peak | Spacewatch | · | 790 m | MPC · JPL |
| 409960 | 2006 UV_{276} | — | October 28, 2006 | Kitt Peak | Spacewatch | · | 840 m | MPC · JPL |
| 409961 | 2006 UA_{277} | — | September 25, 2006 | Kitt Peak | Spacewatch | · | 1.1 km | MPC · JPL |
| 409962 | 2006 UR_{330} | — | October 16, 2006 | Apache Point | A. C. Becker | RAF | 770 m | MPC · JPL |
| 409963 | 2006 UY_{336} | — | October 22, 2006 | Catalina | CSS | (5) | 1.3 km | MPC · JPL |
| 409964 | 2006 VP_{17} | — | November 9, 2006 | Kitt Peak | Spacewatch | (5) | 1.2 km | MPC · JPL |
| 409965 | 2006 VC_{18} | — | November 9, 2006 | Kitt Peak | Spacewatch | · | 1.3 km | MPC · JPL |
| 409966 | 2006 VA_{19} | — | September 27, 2006 | Mount Lemmon | Mount Lemmon Survey | · | 1.4 km | MPC · JPL |
| 409967 | 2006 VQ_{24} | — | September 28, 2006 | Mount Lemmon | Mount Lemmon Survey | · | 1.7 km | MPC · JPL |
| 409968 | 2006 VC_{31} | — | November 10, 2006 | Kitt Peak | Spacewatch | EUN | 1.4 km | MPC · JPL |
| 409969 | 2006 VM_{39} | — | October 13, 2006 | Kitt Peak | Spacewatch | · | 2.2 km | MPC · JPL |
| 409970 | 2006 VZ_{39} | — | November 12, 2006 | Mount Lemmon | Mount Lemmon Survey | · | 1.0 km | MPC · JPL |
| 409971 | 2006 VL_{51} | — | November 10, 2006 | Kitt Peak | Spacewatch | · | 2.6 km | MPC · JPL |
| 409972 | 2006 VB_{62} | — | November 11, 2006 | Kitt Peak | Spacewatch | EUN | 1.5 km | MPC · JPL |
| 409973 | 2006 VF_{69} | — | November 11, 2006 | Kitt Peak | Spacewatch | KON | 9.9 km | MPC · JPL |
| 409974 | 2006 VJ_{75} | — | November 11, 2006 | Kitt Peak | Spacewatch | · | 1.1 km | MPC · JPL |
| 409975 | 2006 VL_{81} | — | September 28, 2006 | Mount Lemmon | Mount Lemmon Survey | · | 1.8 km | MPC · JPL |
| 409976 | 2006 VL_{86} | — | November 14, 2006 | Socorro | LINEAR | · | 1.2 km | MPC · JPL |
| 409977 | 2006 VQ_{86} | — | November 14, 2006 | Socorro | LINEAR | RAF | 1.3 km | MPC · JPL |
| 409978 | 2006 VB_{92} | — | November 15, 2006 | Catalina | CSS | · | 1.7 km | MPC · JPL |
| 409979 | 2006 VR_{93} | — | November 15, 2006 | Mount Lemmon | Mount Lemmon Survey | · | 1.2 km | MPC · JPL |
| 409980 | 2006 VV_{98} | — | September 26, 2006 | Mount Lemmon | Mount Lemmon Survey | · | 1.3 km | MPC · JPL |
| 409981 | 2006 VZ_{100} | — | November 11, 2006 | Catalina | CSS | · | 1.1 km | MPC · JPL |
| 409982 | 2006 VG_{108} | — | November 13, 2006 | Kitt Peak | Spacewatch | · | 1.7 km | MPC · JPL |
| 409983 | 2006 VF_{110} | — | November 13, 2006 | Kitt Peak | Spacewatch | · | 2.2 km | MPC · JPL |
| 409984 | 2006 VV_{111} | — | September 27, 2006 | Mount Lemmon | Mount Lemmon Survey | (5) | 1.3 km | MPC · JPL |
| 409985 | 2006 VA_{127} | — | November 15, 2006 | Mount Lemmon | Mount Lemmon Survey | EUN | 1.3 km | MPC · JPL |
| 409986 | 2006 VH_{129} | — | November 15, 2006 | Socorro | LINEAR | EUN | 1.5 km | MPC · JPL |
| 409987 | 2006 VT_{129} | — | September 27, 2006 | Mount Lemmon | Mount Lemmon Survey | · | 1.2 km | MPC · JPL |
| 409988 | 2006 VN_{134} | — | November 15, 2006 | Catalina | CSS | · | 1.4 km | MPC · JPL |
| 409989 | 2006 VL_{136} | — | October 20, 2006 | Mount Lemmon | Mount Lemmon Survey | · | 1.3 km | MPC · JPL |
| 409990 | 2006 VR_{145} | — | November 15, 2006 | Catalina | CSS | · | 1.2 km | MPC · JPL |
| 409991 | 2006 VW_{150} | — | October 19, 2006 | Mount Lemmon | Mount Lemmon Survey | (5) | 1.4 km | MPC · JPL |
| 409992 | 2006 VT_{152} | — | October 16, 2006 | Catalina | CSS | · | 840 m | MPC · JPL |
| 409993 | 2006 VL_{155} | — | November 14, 2006 | Catalina | CSS | · | 1.6 km | MPC · JPL |
| 409994 | 2006 VM_{173} | — | September 30, 2006 | Mount Lemmon | Mount Lemmon Survey | EUN | 1.4 km | MPC · JPL |
| 409995 | 2006 WV_{3} | — | November 21, 2006 | Socorro | LINEAR | · | 630 m | MPC · JPL |
| 409996 | 2006 WJ_{5} | — | October 22, 2006 | Mount Lemmon | Mount Lemmon Survey | · | 1.2 km | MPC · JPL |
| 409997 | 2006 WD_{11} | — | November 16, 2006 | Socorro | LINEAR | · | 1.3 km | MPC · JPL |
| 409998 | 2006 WT_{13} | — | November 16, 2006 | Mount Lemmon | Mount Lemmon Survey | · | 2.6 km | MPC · JPL |
| 409999 | 2006 WC_{19} | — | November 17, 2006 | Catalina | CSS | · | 1.1 km | MPC · JPL |
| 410000 | 2006 WJ_{25} | — | November 17, 2006 | Mount Lemmon | Mount Lemmon Survey | (5) | 1.5 km | MPC · JPL |

back to top
