= List of minor planets: 459001–460000 =

The following is a partial list of minor planets, running from minor-planet number 459001 through 460000, inclusive. The primary data for this and other partial lists is based on JPL's "Small-Body Orbital Elements" and data available from the Minor Planet Center. Critical list information is also provided by the MPC, unless otherwise specified from Lowell Observatory. A detailed description of the table's columns and additional sources are given on the main page including a complete list of every page in this series, and a statistical break-up on the dynamical classification of minor planets.

Also see the summary list of all named bodies in numerical and alphabetical order, and the corresponding naming citations for the number range of this particular list. New namings may only be added to this list after official publication, as the preannouncement of names is condemned by the Working Group for Small Bodies Nomenclature of the International Astronomical Union.

Near-Earth obj.	MBA (inner)	MBA (outer)	Centaur
Mars-crosser	MBA (middle)	Jupiter trojan	Trans-Neptunian obj.
Unclassified

== 459001–459100 ==
Designation			Discovery			Properties		Ref
Permanent	Provisional	Named after	Date	Site	Discoverer(s)	Category	Diam.	Ref
459001	2011 WW_{144}	—	March 10, 2005	Mount Lemmon	Mount Lemmon Survey	MAS	570 m	MPC · JPL
459002	2011 WY_{144}	—	January 18, 2009	Kitt Peak	Spacewatch	·	980 m	MPC · JPL
459003	2011 WH_{146}	—	November 26, 2011	Kitt Peak	Spacewatch	V	560 m	MPC · JPL
459004	2011 WL_{151}	—	February 22, 1998	Kitt Peak	Spacewatch	PHO	930 m	MPC · JPL
459005	2011 WO_{152}	—	December 15, 2004	Socorro	LINEAR	·	1.0 km	MPC · JPL
459006	2011 WG_{153}	—	March 2, 2009	Kitt Peak	Spacewatch	·	620 m	MPC · JPL
459007	2011 XB_{2}	—	November 19, 2000	Socorro	LINEAR	·	910 m	MPC · JPL
459008	2011 YQ_{3}	—	May 3, 2009	Kitt Peak	Spacewatch	·	1.6 km	MPC · JPL
459009	2011 YY_{3}	—	November 14, 2006	Mount Lemmon	Mount Lemmon Survey	·	2.0 km	MPC · JPL
459010	2011 YB_{8}	—	November 8, 2007	Mount Lemmon	Mount Lemmon Survey	·	1.1 km	MPC · JPL
459011	2011 YJ_{8}	—	October 20, 2007	Mount Lemmon	Mount Lemmon Survey	MAS	670 m	MPC · JPL
459012	2011 YJ_{9}	—	November 1, 2011	Mount Lemmon	Mount Lemmon Survey	·	1.2 km	MPC · JPL
459013	2011 YM_{18}	—	November 30, 2011	Mount Lemmon	Mount Lemmon Survey	·	980 m	MPC · JPL
459014	2011 YY_{22}	—	October 20, 2003	Kitt Peak	Spacewatch	NYS	850 m	MPC · JPL
459015	2011 YS_{23}	—	December 25, 2011	Kitt Peak	Spacewatch	ERI	1.5 km	MPC · JPL
459016	2011 YX_{24}	—	November 20, 2007	Kitt Peak	Spacewatch	NYS	810 m	MPC · JPL
459017	2011 YY_{24}	—	February 3, 2008	Catalina	CSS	·	2.7 km	MPC · JPL
459018	2011 YR_{25}	—	July 6, 2005	Kitt Peak	Spacewatch	·	1.3 km	MPC · JPL
459019	2011 YU_{25}	—	September 10, 2010	Mount Lemmon	Mount Lemmon Survey	·	1.4 km	MPC · JPL
459020	2011 YX_{25}	—	January 16, 2008	Kitt Peak	Spacewatch	EUN	1.4 km	MPC · JPL
459021	2011 YS_{32}	—	January 13, 2008	Mount Lemmon	Mount Lemmon Survey	·	1.1 km	MPC · JPL
459022	2011 YJ_{33}	—	March 18, 2009	Mount Lemmon	Mount Lemmon Survey	·	1.1 km	MPC · JPL
459023	2011 YO_{34}	—	November 5, 2007	Kitt Peak	Spacewatch	NYS	910 m	MPC · JPL
459024	2011 YC_{35}	—	December 26, 2011	Kitt Peak	Spacewatch	·	1.2 km	MPC · JPL
459025	2011 YT_{35}	—	February 11, 2008	Kitt Peak	Spacewatch	·	1.3 km	MPC · JPL
459026	2011 YA_{41}	—	January 20, 2009	Mount Lemmon	Mount Lemmon Survey	·	770 m	MPC · JPL
459027	2011 YK_{43}	—	January 11, 2008	Kitt Peak	Spacewatch	·	990 m	MPC · JPL
459028	2011 YM_{43}	—	November 2, 2007	Kitt Peak	Spacewatch	·	1.3 km	MPC · JPL
459029	2011 YU_{44}	—	November 18, 2003	Kitt Peak	Spacewatch	NYS	1.0 km	MPC · JPL
459030	2011 YH_{46}	—	January 18, 2008	Mount Lemmon	Mount Lemmon Survey	·	1.0 km	MPC · JPL
459031	2011 YS_{46}	—	November 14, 1995	Kitt Peak	Spacewatch	·	1.4 km	MPC · JPL
459032	2011 YS_{48}	—	September 30, 2011	Mount Lemmon	Mount Lemmon Survey	·	920 m	MPC · JPL
459033	2011 YS_{53}	—	January 28, 2004	Kitt Peak	Spacewatch	·	860 m	MPC · JPL
459034	2011 YV_{59}	—	May 18, 2009	Mount Lemmon	Mount Lemmon Survey	NYS	950 m	MPC · JPL
459035	2011 YD_{61}	—	April 25, 2010	WISE	WISE	·	1.5 km	MPC · JPL
459036	2011 YS_{64}	—	April 17, 1996	Kitt Peak	Spacewatch	·	1.3 km	MPC · JPL
459037	2011 YY_{64}	—	October 12, 2007	Mount Lemmon	Mount Lemmon Survey	·	1.2 km	MPC · JPL
459038	2011 YF_{66}	—	December 31, 2011	Kitt Peak	Spacewatch	·	1.1 km	MPC · JPL
459039	2011 YD_{77}	—	November 8, 2007	Mount Lemmon	Mount Lemmon Survey	·	1.7 km	MPC · JPL
459040	2011 YX_{77}	—	November 26, 2011	Mount Lemmon	Mount Lemmon Survey	·	1.6 km	MPC · JPL
459041	2011 YV_{78}	—	March 8, 2005	Anderson Mesa	LONEOS	·	1.3 km	MPC · JPL
459042	2011 YY_{78}	—	August 19, 2006	Anderson Mesa	LONEOS	PHO	1.2 km	MPC · JPL
459043	2012 AU_{1}	—	November 20, 2007	Kitt Peak	Spacewatch	·	1.1 km	MPC · JPL
459044	2012 AB_{9}	—	December 31, 2007	Mount Lemmon	Mount Lemmon Survey	·	1.3 km	MPC · JPL
459045	2012 AY_{9}	—	March 10, 2005	Anderson Mesa	LONEOS	·	1.6 km	MPC · JPL
459046	2012 AS_{10}	—	January 11, 2012	Mount Lemmon	Mount Lemmon Survey	APO +1km	1.2 km	MPC · JPL
459047	2012 AL_{13}	—	December 4, 2007	Kitt Peak	Spacewatch	MAS	790 m	MPC · JPL
459048	2012 AJ_{14}	—	July 27, 2009	Kitt Peak	Spacewatch	·	2.1 km	MPC · JPL
459049	2012 AW_{17}	—	December 4, 2007	Kitt Peak	Spacewatch	NYS	1.2 km	MPC · JPL
459050	2012 AF_{22}	—	January 13, 2008	Catalina	CSS	·	1.5 km	MPC · JPL
459051	2012 BF_{4}	—	December 27, 2011	Kitt Peak	Spacewatch	·	1.3 km	MPC · JPL
459052	2012 BE_{7}	—	April 12, 2005	Kitt Peak	Spacewatch	·	1.1 km	MPC · JPL
459053	2012 BR_{8}	—	February 3, 2009	Mount Lemmon	Mount Lemmon Survey	PHO	1.2 km	MPC · JPL
459054	2012 BS_{8}	—	January 18, 2012	Catalina	CSS	·	1.3 km	MPC · JPL
459055	2012 BB_{12}	—	December 18, 2007	Mount Lemmon	Mount Lemmon Survey	·	1.1 km	MPC · JPL
459056	2012 BD_{16}	—	September 16, 2010	Mount Lemmon	Mount Lemmon Survey	·	1.4 km	MPC · JPL
459057	2012 BL_{17}	—	January 19, 2012	Kitt Peak	Spacewatch	·	1.5 km	MPC · JPL
459058	2012 BW_{17}	—	December 16, 2007	Catalina	CSS	·	1.9 km	MPC · JPL
459059	2012 BL_{18}	—	September 10, 2010	Mount Lemmon	Mount Lemmon Survey	EUN	1.1 km	MPC · JPL
459060	2012 BO_{18}	—	December 18, 2007	Mount Lemmon	Mount Lemmon Survey	·	1.1 km	MPC · JPL
459061	2012 BP_{20}	—	December 30, 2007	Kitt Peak	Spacewatch	·	1.1 km	MPC · JPL
459062	2012 BU_{21}	—	January 18, 2008	Mount Lemmon	Mount Lemmon Survey	EUN	1.1 km	MPC · JPL
459063	2012 BB_{22}	—	December 17, 2003	Kitt Peak	Spacewatch	·	1.2 km	MPC · JPL
459064	2012 BA_{24}	—	December 17, 2007	Mount Lemmon	Mount Lemmon Survey	·	1.4 km	MPC · JPL
459065	2012 BS_{24}	—	January 4, 2012	Mount Lemmon	Mount Lemmon Survey	·	1.4 km	MPC · JPL
459066	2012 BG_{27}	—	November 24, 2003	Socorro	LINEAR	·	1.3 km	MPC · JPL
459067	2012 BT_{27}	—	January 21, 2012	Catalina	CSS	·	1.4 km	MPC · JPL
459068	2012 BM_{29}	—	November 28, 2011	Mount Lemmon	Mount Lemmon Survey	·	1.4 km	MPC · JPL
459069	2012 BB_{30}	—	November 22, 2006	Catalina	CSS	GEF	1 km	MPC · JPL
459070	2012 BO_{32}	—	December 16, 2007	Mount Lemmon	Mount Lemmon Survey	·	1.6 km	MPC · JPL
459071	2012 BZ_{35}	—	November 26, 2003	Kitt Peak	Spacewatch	·	1.1 km	MPC · JPL
459072	2012 BQ_{36}	—	January 20, 2008	Kitt Peak	Spacewatch	·	1.3 km	MPC · JPL
459073	2012 BH_{41}	—	February 7, 2008	Kitt Peak	Spacewatch	·	980 m	MPC · JPL
459074	2012 BN_{47}	—	April 11, 2008	Kitt Peak	Spacewatch	MRX	990 m	MPC · JPL
459075	2012 BJ_{50}	—	December 27, 2011	Mount Lemmon	Mount Lemmon Survey	·	980 m	MPC · JPL
459076	2012 BS_{51}	—	February 9, 2008	Kitt Peak	Spacewatch	KON	2.0 km	MPC · JPL
459077	2012 BB_{52}	—	December 27, 2011	Mount Lemmon	Mount Lemmon Survey	·	1.5 km	MPC · JPL
459078	2012 BW_{52}	—	January 21, 2012	Kitt Peak	Spacewatch	·	2.0 km	MPC · JPL
459079	2012 BQ_{53}	—	June 13, 2004	Kitt Peak	Spacewatch	·	1.3 km	MPC · JPL
459080	2012 BH_{54}	—	November 1, 2010	Mount Lemmon	Mount Lemmon Survey	·	2.1 km	MPC · JPL
459081	2012 BO_{55}	—	February 28, 2008	Kitt Peak	Spacewatch	·	2.2 km	MPC · JPL
459082	2012 BQ_{57}	—	December 31, 2007	Mount Lemmon	Mount Lemmon Survey	·	1.0 km	MPC · JPL
459083	2012 BZ_{57}	—	March 2, 2008	Mount Lemmon	Mount Lemmon Survey	·	1.6 km	MPC · JPL
459084	2012 BY_{62}	—	September 3, 2010	Mount Lemmon	Mount Lemmon Survey	NEM	2.1 km	MPC · JPL
459085	2012 BU_{63}	—	March 3, 2005	Catalina	CSS	·	870 m	MPC · JPL
459086	2012 BJ_{69}	—	January 21, 2012	Kitt Peak	Spacewatch	MAR	800 m	MPC · JPL
459087	2012 BB_{71}	—	December 4, 2007	Mount Lemmon	Mount Lemmon Survey	·	950 m	MPC · JPL
459088	2012 BK_{74}	—	December 16, 2007	Kitt Peak	Spacewatch	PHO	900 m	MPC · JPL
459089	2012 BL_{81}	—	January 3, 2012	Kitt Peak	Spacewatch	PHO	900 m	MPC · JPL
459090	2012 BP_{82}	—	September 3, 2010	Mount Lemmon	Mount Lemmon Survey	·	1.1 km	MPC · JPL
459091	2012 BX_{83}	—	April 28, 2009	Kitt Peak	Spacewatch	·	1.1 km	MPC · JPL
459092	2012 BC_{85}	—	August 28, 2006	Kitt Peak	Spacewatch	(5)	970 m	MPC · JPL
459093	2012 BM_{88}	—	September 26, 2006	Kitt Peak	Spacewatch	·	1.1 km	MPC · JPL
459094	2012 BO_{88}	—	December 20, 2007	Mount Lemmon	Mount Lemmon Survey	·	1.2 km	MPC · JPL
459095	2012 BR_{88}	—	November 11, 2007	Mount Lemmon	Mount Lemmon Survey	·	1.2 km	MPC · JPL
459096	2012 BA_{89}	—	January 10, 2008	Mount Lemmon	Mount Lemmon Survey	·	960 m	MPC · JPL
459097	2012 BJ_{89}	—	January 26, 2012	Kitt Peak	Spacewatch	·	1.7 km	MPC · JPL
459098	2012 BE_{93}	—	February 27, 2008	Mount Lemmon	Mount Lemmon Survey	NEM	1.7 km	MPC · JPL
459099	2012 BR_{98}	—	September 3, 2010	Mount Lemmon	Mount Lemmon Survey	·	1.1 km	MPC · JPL
459100	2012 BP_{100}	—	February 11, 2008	Mount Lemmon	Mount Lemmon Survey	·	1.1 km	MPC · JPL

== 459101–459200 ==
back to top

Designation			Discovery			Properties		Ref
Permanent	Provisional	Named after	Date	Site	Discoverer(s)	Category	Diam.	Ref
459101	2012 BU_{100}	—	December 20, 2004	Mount Lemmon	Mount Lemmon Survey	·	880 m	MPC · JPL
459102	2012 BS_{104}	—	March 10, 2005	Kitt Peak	Spacewatch	NYS	1.1 km	MPC · JPL
459103	2012 BX_{104}	—	March 11, 2008	Mount Lemmon	Mount Lemmon Survey	·	1.7 km	MPC · JPL
459104	2012 BO_{105}	—	December 19, 2007	Mount Lemmon	Mount Lemmon Survey	PHO	780 m	MPC · JPL
459105	2012 BM_{107}	—	November 23, 2006	Mount Lemmon	Mount Lemmon Survey	·	1.4 km	MPC · JPL
459106	2012 BF_{108}	—	February 2, 2008	Kitt Peak	Spacewatch	·	1.4 km	MPC · JPL
459107	2012 BW_{108}	—	January 10, 2008	Kitt Peak	Spacewatch	·	1.2 km	MPC · JPL
459108	2012 BB_{112}	—	January 27, 2012	Kitt Peak	Spacewatch	BRG	1.1 km	MPC · JPL
459109	2012 BS_{116}	—	September 28, 1994	Kitt Peak	Spacewatch	·	800 m	MPC · JPL
459110	2012 BY_{116}	—	February 12, 2004	Kitt Peak	Spacewatch	(5)	940 m	MPC · JPL
459111	2012 BS_{117}	—	November 28, 2011	Mount Lemmon	Mount Lemmon Survey	·	1.2 km	MPC · JPL
459112	2012 BW_{117}	—	March 28, 2004	Kitt Peak	Spacewatch	·	1.2 km	MPC · JPL
459113	2012 BU_{121}	—	January 31, 2008	Kitt Peak	Spacewatch	·	980 m	MPC · JPL
459114	2012 BG_{125}	—	July 5, 2005	Kitt Peak	Spacewatch	MAR	1.2 km	MPC · JPL
459115	2012 BX_{125}	—	January 29, 2012	Kitt Peak	Spacewatch	·	2.5 km	MPC · JPL
459116	2012 BJ_{127}	—	March 4, 2008	Kitt Peak	Spacewatch	·	1.1 km	MPC · JPL
459117	2012 BK_{127}	—	December 30, 2011	Catalina	CSS	H	610 m	MPC · JPL
459118	2012 BE_{129}	—	October 4, 2005	Catalina	CSS	·	2.4 km	MPC · JPL
459119	2012 BJ_{134}	—	January 19, 2012	Mount Lemmon	Mount Lemmon Survey	T_{j} (2.99) · APO +1km	810 m	MPC · JPL
459120	2012 BV_{134}	—	September 28, 2006	Kitt Peak	Spacewatch	·	1.3 km	MPC · JPL
459121	2012 BW_{138}	—	October 20, 2006	Mount Lemmon	Mount Lemmon Survey	·	1.0 km	MPC · JPL
459122	2012 BV_{141}	—	January 14, 2012	Kitt Peak	Spacewatch	(5)	1.1 km	MPC · JPL
459123	2012 BF_{142}	—	March 4, 2005	Catalina	CSS	·	1.5 km	MPC · JPL
459124	2012 BQ_{147}	—	December 27, 2011	Mount Lemmon	Mount Lemmon Survey	·	990 m	MPC · JPL
459125	2012 BR_{150}	—	January 31, 2012	Catalina	CSS	·	1.2 km	MPC · JPL
459126	2012 BL_{152}	—	May 4, 2005	Kitt Peak	Spacewatch	NYS	1.1 km	MPC · JPL
459127	2012 CP	—	February 1, 2012	Mount Lemmon	Mount Lemmon Survey	·	1.7 km	MPC · JPL
459128	2012 CR_{1}	—	March 15, 2004	Kitt Peak	Spacewatch	·	1.3 km	MPC · JPL
459129	2012 CE_{2}	—	January 18, 2012	Kitt Peak	Spacewatch	·	2.1 km	MPC · JPL
459130	2012 CY_{2}	—	January 19, 2012	Haleakala	Pan-STARRS 1	EOS	1.9 km	MPC · JPL
459131	2012 CC_{10}	—	December 28, 2011	Mount Lemmon	Mount Lemmon Survey	·	1.8 km	MPC · JPL
459132	2012 CV_{10}	—	January 19, 2012	Kitt Peak	Spacewatch	·	1.4 km	MPC · JPL
459133	2012 CH_{11}	—	November 1, 2006	Catalina	CSS	·	1.5 km	MPC · JPL
459134	2012 CV_{12}	—	April 16, 2004	Kitt Peak	Spacewatch	·	750 m	MPC · JPL
459135	2012 CX_{12}	—	January 21, 2012	Kitt Peak	Spacewatch	·	1.2 km	MPC · JPL
459136	2012 CO_{13}	—	February 2, 2008	Kitt Peak	Spacewatch	·	1.3 km	MPC · JPL
459137	2012 CW_{16}	—	October 3, 2006	Mount Lemmon	Mount Lemmon Survey	(5)	920 m	MPC · JPL
459138	2012 CP_{17}	—	April 8, 2008	Kitt Peak	Spacewatch	·	1.3 km	MPC · JPL
459139	2012 CK_{18}	—	March 7, 2008	Mount Lemmon	Mount Lemmon Survey	·	1.5 km	MPC · JPL
459140	2012 CH_{23}	—	January 12, 2008	Mount Lemmon	Mount Lemmon Survey	MAR	1.0 km	MPC · JPL
459141	2012 CU_{25}	—	January 18, 2012	Kitt Peak	Spacewatch	·	1.6 km	MPC · JPL
459142	2012 CY_{26}	—	January 11, 2008	Kitt Peak	Spacewatch	·	1.3 km	MPC · JPL
459143	2012 CF_{33}	—	January 1, 2012	Mount Lemmon	Mount Lemmon Survey	·	1.1 km	MPC · JPL
459144	2012 CU_{36}	—	March 24, 2009	Kitt Peak	Spacewatch	·	1.4 km	MPC · JPL
459145	2012 CO_{37}	—	March 2, 2008	Kitt Peak	Spacewatch	·	1.0 km	MPC · JPL
459146	2012 CH_{38}	—	April 11, 2008	Mount Lemmon	Mount Lemmon Survey	·	1.7 km	MPC · JPL
459147	2012 CA_{47}	—	January 19, 2012	Haleakala	Pan-STARRS 1	·	1.0 km	MPC · JPL
459148	2012 CE_{47}	—	February 13, 2012	Kitt Peak	Spacewatch	·	1.6 km	MPC · JPL
459149	2012 CV_{47}	—	March 30, 2008	Catalina	CSS	·	1.9 km	MPC · JPL
459150	2012 CN_{49}	—	October 21, 1995	Kitt Peak	Spacewatch	·	1.0 km	MPC · JPL
459151	2012 CT_{50}	—	February 7, 2008	Kitt Peak	Spacewatch	·	1.3 km	MPC · JPL
459152	2012 CZ_{50}	—	April 5, 2008	Mount Lemmon	Mount Lemmon Survey	·	1.1 km	MPC · JPL
459153	2012 CW_{51}	—	February 8, 2008	Mount Lemmon	Mount Lemmon Survey	·	1.3 km	MPC · JPL
459154	2012 CT_{52}	—	February 2, 2012	Kitt Peak	Spacewatch	NYS	1.1 km	MPC · JPL
459155	2012 CF_{54}	—	February 7, 2008	Mount Lemmon	Mount Lemmon Survey	·	1.0 km	MPC · JPL
459156	2012 CY_{54}	—	July 5, 2005	Kitt Peak	Spacewatch	·	1.2 km	MPC · JPL
459157	2012 DX_{5}	—	January 21, 2012	Haleakala	Pan-STARRS 1	·	1.1 km	MPC · JPL
459158	2012 DL_{6}	—	February 10, 2008	Kitt Peak	Spacewatch	BRG	1.1 km	MPC · JPL
459159	2012 DT_{7}	—	February 2, 2008	Kitt Peak	Spacewatch	·	720 m	MPC · JPL
459160	2012 DN_{9}	—	February 8, 2008	Kitt Peak	Spacewatch	·	940 m	MPC · JPL
459161	2012 DS_{10}	—	September 18, 2006	Kitt Peak	Spacewatch	·	1.1 km	MPC · JPL
459162	2012 DY_{11}	—	February 19, 2012	Kitt Peak	Spacewatch	·	990 m	MPC · JPL
459163	2012 DA_{12}	—	January 30, 2012	Kitt Peak	Spacewatch	·	1.6 km	MPC · JPL
459164	2012 DB_{15}	—	January 10, 2008	Mount Lemmon	Mount Lemmon Survey	·	1.3 km	MPC · JPL
459165	2012 DN_{16}	—	February 21, 2007	Kitt Peak	Spacewatch	·	2.1 km	MPC · JPL
459166	2012 DQ_{17}	—	October 28, 2010	Mount Lemmon	Mount Lemmon Survey	·	1.5 km	MPC · JPL
459167	2012 DA_{22}	—	March 30, 2008	Catalina	CSS	·	1.5 km	MPC · JPL
459168	2012 DU_{22}	—	November 3, 2010	Mount Lemmon	Mount Lemmon Survey	·	1.5 km	MPC · JPL
459169	2012 DA_{23}	—	October 6, 2005	Kitt Peak	Spacewatch	·	1.4 km	MPC · JPL
459170	2012 DF_{23}	—	January 19, 2012	Mount Lemmon	Mount Lemmon Survey	·	1.2 km	MPC · JPL
459171	2012 DH_{23}	—	May 3, 2008	Mount Lemmon	Mount Lemmon Survey	·	1 km	MPC · JPL
459172	2012 DV_{24}	—	February 21, 2012	Kitt Peak	Spacewatch	·	1.5 km	MPC · JPL
459173	2012 DB_{25}	—	March 25, 2007	Mount Lemmon	Mount Lemmon Survey	·	2.4 km	MPC · JPL
459174	2012 DJ_{25}	—	February 21, 2012	Kitt Peak	Spacewatch	·	1.4 km	MPC · JPL
459175	2012 DQ_{26}	—	April 16, 2008	Mount Lemmon	Mount Lemmon Survey	·	1.8 km	MPC · JPL
459176	2012 DS_{27}	—	April 27, 2008	Mount Lemmon	Mount Lemmon Survey	·	1.5 km	MPC · JPL
459177	2012 DX_{28}	—	February 22, 2012	Kitt Peak	Spacewatch	·	2.1 km	MPC · JPL
459178	2012 DV_{33}	—	September 30, 2006	Mount Lemmon	Mount Lemmon Survey	·	920 m	MPC · JPL
459179	2012 DY_{34}	—	November 19, 2006	Kitt Peak	Spacewatch	·	1.3 km	MPC · JPL
459180	2012 DP_{35}	—	March 31, 2008	Mount Lemmon	Mount Lemmon Survey	·	1.1 km	MPC · JPL
459181	2012 DK_{36}	—	March 31, 2008	Kitt Peak	Spacewatch	·	1.1 km	MPC · JPL
459182	2012 DM_{39}	—	November 1, 2010	Mount Lemmon	Mount Lemmon Survey	·	960 m	MPC · JPL
459183	2012 DS_{39}	—	January 5, 2011	Catalina	CSS	·	2.0 km	MPC · JPL
459184	2012 DC_{40}	—	March 12, 2008	Kitt Peak	Spacewatch	·	850 m	MPC · JPL
459185	2012 DG_{44}	—	September 18, 2010	Mount Lemmon	Mount Lemmon Survey	ADE	1.7 km	MPC · JPL
459186	2012 DC_{45}	—	December 24, 2006	Mount Lemmon	Mount Lemmon Survey	·	1.7 km	MPC · JPL
459187	2012 DD_{46}	—	May 4, 2008	Kitt Peak	Spacewatch	EUN	1.1 km	MPC · JPL
459188	2012 DM_{46}	—	February 26, 2012	Mount Lemmon	Mount Lemmon Survey	·	1.2 km	MPC · JPL
459189	2012 DU_{46}	—	July 2, 2010	WISE	WISE	·	3.1 km	MPC · JPL
459190	2012 DJ_{47}	—	August 17, 1998	Socorro	LINEAR	·	1.5 km	MPC · JPL
459191	2012 DQ_{47}	—	February 2, 2008	Mount Lemmon	Mount Lemmon Survey	·	1.1 km	MPC · JPL
459192	2012 DG_{48}	—	December 31, 2007	Mount Lemmon	Mount Lemmon Survey	·	1.2 km	MPC · JPL
459193	2012 DL_{48}	—	November 3, 2010	Mount Lemmon	Mount Lemmon Survey	·	1.5 km	MPC · JPL
459194	2012 DY_{48}	—	February 1, 2012	Kitt Peak	Spacewatch	·	1.2 km	MPC · JPL
459195	2012 DT_{53}	—	February 22, 2012	Kitt Peak	Spacewatch	·	1.7 km	MPC · JPL
459196	2012 DX_{54}	—	December 27, 2011	Mount Lemmon	Mount Lemmon Survey	MAR	1.5 km	MPC · JPL
459197	2012 DZ_{56}	—	February 25, 2012	Mount Lemmon	Mount Lemmon Survey	·	1.0 km	MPC · JPL
459198	2012 DD_{58}	—	November 3, 2010	Kitt Peak	Spacewatch	·	1.6 km	MPC · JPL
459199	2012 DH_{60}	—	February 21, 2012	Kitt Peak	Spacewatch	·	1.9 km	MPC · JPL
459200	2012 DK_{61}	—	February 23, 2012	Kitt Peak	Spacewatch	AMO	220 m	MPC · JPL

== 459201–459300 ==
back to top

Designation			Discovery			Properties		Ref
Permanent	Provisional	Named after	Date	Site	Discoverer(s)	Category	Diam.	Ref
459201	2012 DX_{62}	—	January 30, 2012	Kitt Peak	Spacewatch	·	2.5 km	MPC · JPL
459202	2012 DL_{67}	—	February 24, 2012	Kitt Peak	Spacewatch	NAE	2.6 km	MPC · JPL
459203	2012 DB_{72}	—	October 13, 2010	Mount Lemmon	Mount Lemmon Survey	·	1.8 km	MPC · JPL
459204	2012 DV_{72}	—	September 26, 2006	Mount Lemmon	Mount Lemmon Survey	(5)	960 m	MPC · JPL
459205	2012 DZ_{73}	—	December 31, 2007	Kitt Peak	Spacewatch	NYS	980 m	MPC · JPL
459206	2012 DH_{74}	—	February 27, 2012	Kitt Peak	Spacewatch	·	1.5 km	MPC · JPL
459207	2012 DP_{77}	—	January 1, 2008	Kitt Peak	Spacewatch	PHO	950 m	MPC · JPL
459208	2012 DT_{78}	—	February 2, 2008	Mount Lemmon	Mount Lemmon Survey	·	1.3 km	MPC · JPL
459209	2012 DP_{80}	—	May 9, 2004	Kitt Peak	Spacewatch	·	1.1 km	MPC · JPL
459210	2012 DU_{80}	—	March 11, 2008	Mount Lemmon	Mount Lemmon Survey	·	1.2 km	MPC · JPL
459211	2012 DD_{81}	—	February 7, 2008	Kitt Peak	Spacewatch	·	1.2 km	MPC · JPL
459212	2012 DN_{81}	—	December 27, 2011	Mount Lemmon	Mount Lemmon Survey	·	1.4 km	MPC · JPL
459213	2012 DQ_{82}	—	September 29, 2005	Kitt Peak	Spacewatch	·	1.7 km	MPC · JPL
459214	2012 DS_{82}	—	March 16, 2007	Kitt Peak	Spacewatch	·	2.3 km	MPC · JPL
459215	2012 DE_{83}	—	February 23, 2012	Mount Lemmon	Mount Lemmon Survey	·	780 m	MPC · JPL
459216	2012 DH_{87}	—	September 30, 2005	Catalina	CSS	·	2.7 km	MPC · JPL
459217	2012 DN_{87}	—	March 8, 2008	Kitt Peak	Spacewatch	EUN	1.0 km	MPC · JPL
459218	2012 DZ_{87}	—	February 21, 2012	Mount Lemmon	Mount Lemmon Survey	·	1.6 km	MPC · JPL
459219	2012 DJ_{88}	—	April 26, 2003	Kitt Peak	Spacewatch	·	1.5 km	MPC · JPL
459220	2012 DC_{90}	—	March 7, 2008	Catalina	CSS	·	1.6 km	MPC · JPL
459221	2012 DW_{90}	—	February 7, 2008	Kitt Peak	Spacewatch	NYS	1.1 km	MPC · JPL
459222	2012 DF_{92}	—	March 11, 2008	Kitt Peak	Spacewatch	·	1.4 km	MPC · JPL
459223	2012 DA_{96}	—	February 23, 2012	Mount Lemmon	Mount Lemmon Survey	·	1.6 km	MPC · JPL
459224	2012 DS_{96}	—	June 30, 2005	Kitt Peak	Spacewatch	·	1.3 km	MPC · JPL
459225	2012 DO_{97}	—	February 18, 2012	Catalina	CSS	EUN	1.2 km	MPC · JPL
459226	2012 EB_{1}	—	April 30, 2008	Kitt Peak	Spacewatch	·	1.5 km	MPC · JPL
459227	2012 EH_{4}	—	February 21, 2012	Mount Lemmon	Mount Lemmon Survey	·	2.0 km	MPC · JPL
459228	2012 EP_{4}	—	April 4, 2008	Mount Lemmon	Mount Lemmon Survey	·	1.2 km	MPC · JPL
459229	2012 EA_{5}	—	July 5, 2005	Siding Spring	SSS	·	1.7 km	MPC · JPL
459230	2012 ER_{6}	—	September 4, 2010	Kitt Peak	Spacewatch	·	1.5 km	MPC · JPL
459231	2012 EN_{8}	—	February 10, 2008	Kitt Peak	Spacewatch	·	1.4 km	MPC · JPL
459232	2012 EH_{12}	—	November 22, 2006	Kitt Peak	Spacewatch	·	1.2 km	MPC · JPL
459233	2012 EB_{13}	—	March 15, 2012	Mount Lemmon	Mount Lemmon Survey	ADE	1.9 km	MPC · JPL
459234	2012 EV_{15}	—	March 10, 2008	Kitt Peak	Spacewatch	ADE	1.3 km	MPC · JPL
459235	2012 ER_{16}	—	October 12, 2010	Kitt Peak	Spacewatch	·	1.6 km	MPC · JPL
459236	2012 FH_{1}	—	December 15, 2006	Kitt Peak	Spacewatch	JUN	1.1 km	MPC · JPL
459237	2012 FC_{7}	—	April 19, 2004	Kitt Peak	Spacewatch	·	860 m	MPC · JPL
459238	2012 FH_{11}	—	December 29, 2005	Kitt Peak	Spacewatch	EMA	3.5 km	MPC · JPL
459239	2012 FD_{15}	—	October 3, 2005	Kitt Peak	Spacewatch	EUN	1.3 km	MPC · JPL
459240	2012 FL_{15}	—	August 15, 2009	Kitt Peak	Spacewatch	·	2.4 km	MPC · JPL
459241	2012 FN_{15}	—	January 13, 2008	Kitt Peak	Spacewatch	·	2.1 km	MPC · JPL
459242	2012 FZ_{19}	—	February 24, 2012	Kitt Peak	Spacewatch	·	2.2 km	MPC · JPL
459243	2012 FZ_{20}	—	November 1, 2006	Kitt Peak	Spacewatch	(5)	1.1 km	MPC · JPL
459244	2012 FB_{21}	—	November 30, 2005	Mount Lemmon	Mount Lemmon Survey	·	1.4 km	MPC · JPL
459245	2012 FL_{22}	—	February 25, 2012	Kitt Peak	Spacewatch	MAR	860 m	MPC · JPL
459246	2012 FJ_{25}	—	September 29, 2005	Kitt Peak	Spacewatch	·	2.5 km	MPC · JPL
459247	2012 FV_{25}	—	April 1, 2008	Kitt Peak	Spacewatch	·	1.1 km	MPC · JPL
459248	2012 FD_{28}	—	January 17, 2007	Kitt Peak	Spacewatch	·	1.5 km	MPC · JPL
459249	2012 FY_{31}	—	May 5, 2008	Kitt Peak	Spacewatch	EUN	1.2 km	MPC · JPL
459250	2012 FL_{34}	—	February 26, 2012	Kitt Peak	Spacewatch	·	2.2 km	MPC · JPL
459251	2012 FA_{35}	—	March 31, 2003	Kitt Peak	Spacewatch	DOR	1.7 km	MPC · JPL
459252	2012 FP_{36}	—	January 11, 1994	Kitt Peak	Spacewatch	·	1.4 km	MPC · JPL
459253	2012 FG_{39}	—	October 8, 2010	Kitt Peak	Spacewatch	·	1.2 km	MPC · JPL
459254	2012 FV_{43}	—	December 30, 2005	Mount Lemmon	Mount Lemmon Survey	·	2.7 km	MPC · JPL
459255	2012 FL_{44}	—	November 6, 2005	Mount Lemmon	Mount Lemmon Survey	·	1.7 km	MPC · JPL
459256	2012 FZ_{46}	—	March 5, 2008	Kitt Peak	Spacewatch	·	890 m	MPC · JPL
459257	2012 FJ_{48}	—	March 13, 2012	Mount Lemmon	Mount Lemmon Survey	·	1.5 km	MPC · JPL
459258	2012 FV_{48}	—	April 7, 2003	Kitt Peak	Spacewatch	·	1.5 km	MPC · JPL
459259	2012 FJ_{49}	—	March 29, 2007	Kitt Peak	Spacewatch	·	1.3 km	MPC · JPL
459260	2012 FW_{52}	—	March 16, 2012	Kitt Peak	Spacewatch	·	2.0 km	MPC · JPL
459261	2012 FF_{54}	—	October 9, 2004	Kitt Peak	Spacewatch	·	1.8 km	MPC · JPL
459262	2012 FZ_{54}	—	September 19, 2009	Mount Lemmon	Mount Lemmon Survey	WIT	820 m	MPC · JPL
459263	2012 FB_{55}	—	March 16, 2012	Kitt Peak	Spacewatch	·	1.6 km	MPC · JPL
459264	2012 FM_{56}	—	May 3, 2008	Mount Lemmon	Mount Lemmon Survey	·	1.2 km	MPC · JPL
459265	2012 FX_{56}	—	March 12, 2012	Kitt Peak	Spacewatch	·	1.6 km	MPC · JPL
459266	2012 FT_{60}	—	October 31, 2005	Mount Lemmon	Mount Lemmon Survey	·	2.5 km	MPC · JPL
459267	2012 FM_{61}	—	October 28, 2005	Mount Lemmon	Mount Lemmon Survey	·	1.6 km	MPC · JPL
459268	2012 FU_{61}	—	April 25, 2007	Kitt Peak	Spacewatch	·	2.8 km	MPC · JPL
459269	2012 FR_{64}	—	February 28, 2008	Kitt Peak	Spacewatch	·	980 m	MPC · JPL
459270	2012 FB_{67}	—	December 15, 2006	Kitt Peak	Spacewatch	·	1.3 km	MPC · JPL
459271	2012 FL_{67}	—	December 14, 2006	Kitt Peak	Spacewatch	·	1.2 km	MPC · JPL
459272	2012 FF_{69}	—	April 28, 2003	Kitt Peak	Spacewatch	·	1.9 km	MPC · JPL
459273	2012 FU_{72}	—	January 30, 2012	Mount Lemmon	Mount Lemmon Survey	·	2.1 km	MPC · JPL
459274	2012 FG_{73}	—	September 20, 2009	Mount Lemmon	Mount Lemmon Survey	·	1.5 km	MPC · JPL
459275	2012 FV_{74}	—	March 1, 2012	Mount Lemmon	Mount Lemmon Survey	EUN	1.3 km	MPC · JPL
459276	2012 FM_{75}	—	February 25, 2012	Catalina	CSS	·	1.6 km	MPC · JPL
459277	2012 FE_{77}	—	April 11, 2008	Kitt Peak	Spacewatch	·	1.3 km	MPC · JPL
459278	2012 FG_{78}	—	November 16, 2006	Kitt Peak	Spacewatch	·	1.3 km	MPC · JPL
459279	2012 FH_{78}	—	February 24, 2012	Mount Lemmon	Mount Lemmon Survey	ADE	1.8 km	MPC · JPL
459280	2012 FM_{82}	—	April 7, 2003	Kitt Peak	Spacewatch	·	1.6 km	MPC · JPL
459281	2012 GB	—	December 30, 2011	Mount Lemmon	Mount Lemmon Survey	·	2.8 km	MPC · JPL
459282	2012 GU_{2}	—	March 31, 2012	Mount Lemmon	Mount Lemmon Survey	HOF	2.3 km	MPC · JPL
459283	2012 GB_{3}	—	December 24, 2006	Kitt Peak	Spacewatch	·	1.2 km	MPC · JPL
459284	2012 GR_{3}	—	March 27, 2012	Kitt Peak	Spacewatch	·	2.2 km	MPC · JPL
459285	2012 GX_{4}	—	March 14, 2012	Kitt Peak	Spacewatch	·	1.4 km	MPC · JPL
459286	2012 GY_{4}	—	January 30, 2012	Mount Lemmon	Mount Lemmon Survey	·	2.1 km	MPC · JPL
459287	2012 GX_{6}	—	April 1, 2012	Mount Lemmon	Mount Lemmon Survey	TEL	1.4 km	MPC · JPL
459288	2012 GK_{7}	—	March 15, 2012	Kitt Peak	Spacewatch	·	1.9 km	MPC · JPL
459289	2012 GC_{8}	—	January 2, 2012	Mount Lemmon	Mount Lemmon Survey	·	2.9 km	MPC · JPL
459290	2012 GQ_{12}	—	December 13, 2010	Mount Lemmon	Mount Lemmon Survey	ADE	1.9 km	MPC · JPL
459291	2012 GT_{12}	—	December 25, 2005	Kitt Peak	Spacewatch	·	2.0 km	MPC · JPL
459292	2012 GA_{13}	—	April 14, 2007	Kitt Peak	Spacewatch	BRA	1.9 km	MPC · JPL
459293	2012 GQ_{13}	—	May 27, 2003	Kitt Peak	Spacewatch	·	2.0 km	MPC · JPL
459294	2012 GL_{14}	—	March 4, 2012	Mount Lemmon	Mount Lemmon Survey	·	1.7 km	MPC · JPL
459295	2012 GP_{16}	—	September 25, 2009	Mount Lemmon	Mount Lemmon Survey	RAF	880 m	MPC · JPL
459296	2012 GA_{17}	—	December 1, 2010	Mount Lemmon	Mount Lemmon Survey	·	1.4 km	MPC · JPL
459297	2012 GE_{17}	—	April 10, 2003	Kitt Peak	Spacewatch	·	1.8 km	MPC · JPL
459298	2012 GZ_{19}	—	October 7, 1996	Kitt Peak	Spacewatch	·	1.6 km	MPC · JPL
459299	2012 GE_{21}	—	November 18, 2006	Mount Lemmon	Mount Lemmon Survey	·	1.4 km	MPC · JPL
459300	2012 GS_{22}	—	January 8, 2011	Mount Lemmon	Mount Lemmon Survey	·	2.1 km	MPC · JPL

== 459301–459400 ==
back to top

Designation			Discovery			Properties		Ref
Permanent	Provisional	Named after	Date	Site	Discoverer(s)	Category	Diam.	Ref
459301	2012 GN_{24}	—	February 10, 2007	Catalina	CSS	·	2.3 km	MPC · JPL
459302	2012 GP_{25}	—	September 30, 2005	Mount Lemmon	Mount Lemmon Survey	·	1.8 km	MPC · JPL
459303	2012 GS_{25}	—	February 24, 2012	Mount Lemmon	Mount Lemmon Survey	·	1.4 km	MPC · JPL
459304	2012 GC_{26}	—	March 4, 2012	Mount Lemmon	Mount Lemmon Survey	·	1.4 km	MPC · JPL
459305	2012 GT_{27}	—	March 27, 2012	Mount Lemmon	Mount Lemmon Survey	·	2.0 km	MPC · JPL
459306	2012 GY_{27}	—	March 28, 2012	Mount Lemmon	Mount Lemmon Survey	·	1.4 km	MPC · JPL
459307	2012 GZ_{27}	—	March 31, 2008	Mount Lemmon	Mount Lemmon Survey	MAR	1.2 km	MPC · JPL
459308	2012 GN_{29}	—	April 11, 2012	Mount Lemmon	Mount Lemmon Survey	·	1.6 km	MPC · JPL
459309	2012 GS_{29}	—	November 19, 2009	Mount Lemmon	Mount Lemmon Survey	EOS	1.9 km	MPC · JPL
459310	2012 GZ_{32}	—	January 22, 2006	Mount Lemmon	Mount Lemmon Survey	·	1.9 km	MPC · JPL
459311	2012 GF_{33}	—	September 29, 2008	Mount Lemmon	Mount Lemmon Survey	·	3.6 km	MPC · JPL
459312	2012 GY_{33}	—	August 28, 2005	Kitt Peak	Spacewatch	EUN	1.4 km	MPC · JPL
459313	2012 GM_{37}	—	March 30, 2012	Kitt Peak	Spacewatch	·	1.7 km	MPC · JPL
459314	2012 GC_{39}	—	January 28, 2011	Mount Lemmon	Mount Lemmon Survey	·	1.7 km	MPC · JPL
459315	2012 GA_{40}	—	October 24, 2009	Mount Lemmon	Mount Lemmon Survey	DOR	2.8 km	MPC · JPL
459316	2012 HS_{1}	—	March 30, 2012	Mount Lemmon	Mount Lemmon Survey	·	2.1 km	MPC · JPL
459317	2012 HT_{1}	—	March 15, 2012	Catalina	CSS	·	2.1 km	MPC · JPL
459318	2012 HU_{3}	—	April 16, 2012	Catalina	CSS	·	1.6 km	MPC · JPL
459319	2012 HV_{5}	—	December 9, 1999	Kitt Peak	Spacewatch	·	2.7 km	MPC · JPL
459320	2012 HL_{6}	—	March 1, 2010	WISE	WISE	·	3.7 km	MPC · JPL
459321	2012 HX_{8}	—	April 18, 2012	Kitt Peak	Spacewatch	·	3.9 km	MPC · JPL
459322	2012 HB_{9}	—	January 7, 2010	Mount Lemmon	Mount Lemmon Survey	·	3.2 km	MPC · JPL
459323	2012 HF_{10}	—	July 22, 1995	Kitt Peak	Spacewatch	EUN	1.4 km	MPC · JPL
459324	2012 HY_{11}	—	June 14, 2004	Kitt Peak	Spacewatch	·	1.4 km	MPC · JPL
459325	2012 HM_{17}	—	November 20, 2009	Mount Lemmon	Mount Lemmon Survey	·	2.9 km	MPC · JPL
459326	2012 HX_{18}	—	April 2, 2006	Anderson Mesa	LONEOS	·	3.4 km	MPC · JPL
459327	2012 HK_{19}	—	April 22, 2012	Mount Lemmon	Mount Lemmon Survey	·	3.1 km	MPC · JPL
459328	2012 HX_{19}	—	November 10, 2009	Kitt Peak	Spacewatch	·	2.7 km	MPC · JPL
459329	2012 HE_{20}	—	December 26, 2011	Mount Lemmon	Mount Lemmon Survey	·	1.4 km	MPC · JPL
459330	2012 HY_{22}	—	February 18, 2007	Anderson Mesa	LONEOS	·	2.7 km	MPC · JPL
459331	2012 HR_{23}	—	March 30, 2012	Kitt Peak	Spacewatch	RAF	1.0 km	MPC · JPL
459332	2012 HT_{23}	—	December 27, 2006	Mount Lemmon	Mount Lemmon Survey	·	1.9 km	MPC · JPL
459333	2012 HZ_{27}	—	December 11, 2009	Mount Lemmon	Mount Lemmon Survey	·	3.4 km	MPC · JPL
459334	2012 HO_{38}	—	September 17, 2010	Mount Lemmon	Mount Lemmon Survey	·	1.8 km	MPC · JPL
459335	2012 HC_{39}	—	November 26, 2011	Mount Lemmon	Mount Lemmon Survey	·	1.8 km	MPC · JPL
459336	2012 HF_{39}	—	April 13, 2012	Siding Spring	SSS	·	2.6 km	MPC · JPL
459337	2012 HO_{39}	—	January 14, 2011	Mount Lemmon	Mount Lemmon Survey	·	1.7 km	MPC · JPL
459338	2012 HZ_{40}	—	January 15, 1996	Kitt Peak	Spacewatch	·	2.2 km	MPC · JPL
459339	2012 HA_{41}	—	September 26, 2009	Kitt Peak	Spacewatch	·	1.6 km	MPC · JPL
459340	2012 HP_{41}	—	September 17, 2009	Kitt Peak	Spacewatch	·	2.0 km	MPC · JPL
459341	2012 HX_{42}	—	February 16, 2007	Catalina	CSS	·	1.9 km	MPC · JPL
459342	2012 HC_{47}	—	May 11, 2007	Mount Lemmon	Mount Lemmon Survey	·	1.7 km	MPC · JPL
459343	2012 HM_{51}	—	September 29, 2008	Catalina	CSS	·	3.6 km	MPC · JPL
459344	2012 HV_{51}	—	April 25, 2012	Kitt Peak	Spacewatch	EOS	1.7 km	MPC · JPL
459345	2012 HY_{52}	—	January 8, 2011	Mount Lemmon	Mount Lemmon Survey	·	2.0 km	MPC · JPL
459346	2012 HR_{53}	—	March 29, 2012	Kitt Peak	Spacewatch	·	1.4 km	MPC · JPL
459347	2012 HM_{54}	—	November 14, 2010	Mount Lemmon	Mount Lemmon Survey	·	1.4 km	MPC · JPL
459348	2012 HF_{55}	—	November 12, 2010	Mount Lemmon	Mount Lemmon Survey	·	1.4 km	MPC · JPL
459349	2012 HE_{56}	—	March 31, 2012	Kitt Peak	Spacewatch	·	3.1 km	MPC · JPL
459350	2012 HG_{59}	—	April 4, 2008	Kitt Peak	Spacewatch	·	1.2 km	MPC · JPL
459351	2012 HL_{60}	—	June 10, 1999	Kitt Peak	Spacewatch	MIS	2.5 km	MPC · JPL
459352	2012 HJ_{61}	—	March 8, 2011	Catalina	CSS	·	4.3 km	MPC · JPL
459353	2012 HH_{62}	—	February 24, 2012	Mount Lemmon	Mount Lemmon Survey	JUN	930 m	MPC · JPL
459354	2012 HO_{69}	—	November 9, 2009	Kitt Peak	Spacewatch	·	2.9 km	MPC · JPL
459355	2012 HQ_{75}	—	January 27, 2007	Mount Lemmon	Mount Lemmon Survey	DOR	1.9 km	MPC · JPL
459356	2012 HT_{78}	—	April 30, 2012	Mount Lemmon	Mount Lemmon Survey	·	2.2 km	MPC · JPL
459357	2012 HN_{79}	—	August 24, 2008	Kitt Peak	Spacewatch	·	2.5 km	MPC · JPL
459358	2012 HN_{81}	—	April 30, 2012	Kitt Peak	Spacewatch	·	3.2 km	MPC · JPL
459359	2012 HN_{83}	—	January 10, 2007	Kitt Peak	Spacewatch	EUN	930 m	MPC · JPL
459360	2012 HO_{83}	—	December 14, 2006	Mount Lemmon	Mount Lemmon Survey	·	1.5 km	MPC · JPL
459361	2012 JE_{2}	—	April 19, 2012	Kitt Peak	Spacewatch	EOS	2.0 km	MPC · JPL
459362	2012 JD_{12}	—	March 15, 2008	Mount Lemmon	Mount Lemmon Survey	·	1.6 km	MPC · JPL
459363	2012 JR_{13}	—	May 25, 2003	Kitt Peak	Spacewatch	·	2.3 km	MPC · JPL
459364	2012 JA_{14}	—	March 14, 2007	Mount Lemmon	Mount Lemmon Survey	·	1.8 km	MPC · JPL
459365	2012 JF_{15}	—	May 12, 2012	Mount Lemmon	Mount Lemmon Survey	EOS	2.1 km	MPC · JPL
459366	2012 JN_{18}	—	November 6, 2010	Mount Lemmon	Mount Lemmon Survey	·	2.7 km	MPC · JPL
459367	2012 JH_{23}	—	May 1, 2003	Kitt Peak	Spacewatch	·	2.0 km	MPC · JPL
459368	2012 JK_{24}	—	February 23, 2007	Mount Lemmon	Mount Lemmon Survey	·	2.0 km	MPC · JPL
459369	2012 JR_{24}	—	March 15, 2012	Mount Lemmon	Mount Lemmon Survey	·	1.3 km	MPC · JPL
459370	2012 JV_{27}	—	June 12, 2008	Kitt Peak	Spacewatch	·	1.4 km	MPC · JPL
459371	2012 JF_{29}	—	April 21, 2012	Mount Lemmon	Mount Lemmon Survey	·	2.7 km	MPC · JPL
459372	2012 JA_{32}	—	May 1, 2012	Mount Lemmon	Mount Lemmon Survey	·	1.5 km	MPC · JPL
459373	2012 JE_{35}	—	April 15, 2001	Kitt Peak	Spacewatch	EOS	2.0 km	MPC · JPL
459374	2012 JF_{38}	—	April 17, 2012	Kitt Peak	Spacewatch	·	1.3 km	MPC · JPL
459375	2012 JR_{41}	—	June 18, 2007	Kitt Peak	Spacewatch	·	4.3 km	MPC · JPL
459376	2012 JM_{42}	—	May 14, 2012	Mount Lemmon	Mount Lemmon Survey	·	2.5 km	MPC · JPL
459377	2012 JN_{45}	—	November 19, 2009	Kitt Peak	Spacewatch	EOS	1.8 km	MPC · JPL
459378	2012 JY_{49}	—	April 21, 2012	Mount Lemmon	Mount Lemmon Survey	·	2.7 km	MPC · JPL
459379	2012 JK_{57}	—	February 13, 2011	Mount Lemmon	Mount Lemmon Survey	·	2.6 km	MPC · JPL
459380	2012 JR_{60}	—	April 1, 2012	Mount Lemmon	Mount Lemmon Survey	TRE	2.4 km	MPC · JPL
459381	2012 JX_{61}	—	May 14, 2012	Mount Lemmon	Mount Lemmon Survey	·	1.8 km	MPC · JPL
459382	2012 JY_{61}	—	April 30, 2012	Mount Lemmon	Mount Lemmon Survey	EOS	1.8 km	MPC · JPL
459383	2012 JV_{62}	—	March 13, 2007	Mount Lemmon	Mount Lemmon Survey	·	1.6 km	MPC · JPL
459384	2012 KM_{8}	—	November 11, 2009	Mount Lemmon	Mount Lemmon Survey	EOS	1.4 km	MPC · JPL
459385	2012 KA_{11}	—	January 14, 2011	Mount Lemmon	Mount Lemmon Survey	·	2.5 km	MPC · JPL
459386	2012 KJ_{11}	—	May 17, 2012	Mount Lemmon	Mount Lemmon Survey	APO +1km	1.4 km	MPC · JPL
459387	2012 KD_{12}	—	April 2, 2011	Mount Lemmon	Mount Lemmon Survey	·	4.0 km	MPC · JPL
459388	2012 KC_{16}	—	May 20, 2012	Mount Lemmon	Mount Lemmon Survey	EOS	2.1 km	MPC · JPL
459389	2012 KQ_{19}	—	April 1, 2012	Kitt Peak	Spacewatch	·	2.8 km	MPC · JPL
459390	2012 KQ_{20}	—	March 28, 2012	Kitt Peak	Spacewatch	·	2.3 km	MPC · JPL
459391	2012 KF_{23}	—	March 16, 2007	Mount Lemmon	Mount Lemmon Survey	·	1.9 km	MPC · JPL
459392	2012 KK_{25}	—	September 24, 2008	Mount Lemmon	Mount Lemmon Survey	CYB	3.0 km	MPC · JPL
459393	2012 KE_{26}	—	December 25, 2010	Kitt Peak	Spacewatch	·	1.5 km	MPC · JPL
459394	2012 KJ_{26}	—	October 16, 2009	Mount Lemmon	Mount Lemmon Survey	·	1.8 km	MPC · JPL
459395	2012 KE_{29}	—	October 7, 2005	Kitt Peak	Spacewatch	·	1.3 km	MPC · JPL
459396	2012 KJ_{30}	—	May 19, 2012	Mount Lemmon	Mount Lemmon Survey	·	2.9 km	MPC · JPL
459397	2012 KK_{31}	—	March 28, 2012	Kitt Peak	Spacewatch	(31811)	2.8 km	MPC · JPL
459398	2012 KO_{31}	—	April 20, 2012	Mount Lemmon	Mount Lemmon Survey	EOS	2.0 km	MPC · JPL
459399	2012 KB_{40}	—	May 19, 2012	Mount Lemmon	Mount Lemmon Survey	·	2.2 km	MPC · JPL
459400	2012 KX_{47}	—	April 27, 2012	Mount Lemmon	Mount Lemmon Survey	·	1.2 km	MPC · JPL

== 459401–459500 ==
back to top

Designation			Discovery			Properties		Ref
Permanent	Provisional	Named after	Date	Site	Discoverer(s)	Category	Diam.	Ref
459401	2012 KE_{48}	—	May 31, 2012	Mount Lemmon	Mount Lemmon Survey	EOS	1.9 km	MPC · JPL
459402	2012 KT_{49}	—	December 25, 2005	Kitt Peak	Spacewatch	·	1.8 km	MPC · JPL
459403	2012 KK_{50}	—	September 27, 2003	Kitt Peak	Spacewatch	EOS	1.8 km	MPC · JPL
459404	2012 LR	—	May 21, 2012	Mount Lemmon	Mount Lemmon Survey	·	2.9 km	MPC · JPL
459405	2012 LZ_{5}	—	November 24, 2009	Mount Lemmon	Mount Lemmon Survey	·	2.2 km	MPC · JPL
459406	2012 LD_{9}	—	May 18, 2012	Kitt Peak	Spacewatch	BRA	1.4 km	MPC · JPL
459407	2012 LU_{14}	—	February 13, 2011	Mount Lemmon	Mount Lemmon Survey	·	2.8 km	MPC · JPL
459408	2012 LP_{17}	—	February 1, 2003	Kitt Peak	Spacewatch	·	1.2 km	MPC · JPL
459409	2012 LY_{17}	—	February 16, 2010	WISE	WISE	·	3.7 km	MPC · JPL
459410	2012 LL_{20}	—	February 4, 2005	Kitt Peak	Spacewatch	·	2.7 km	MPC · JPL
459411	2012 LO_{22}	—	December 4, 2005	Kitt Peak	Spacewatch	·	2.1 km	MPC · JPL
459412	2012 MR_{5}	—	January 12, 2011	Mount Lemmon	Mount Lemmon Survey	·	2.4 km	MPC · JPL
459413	2012 MO_{15}	—	April 10, 2010	WISE	WISE	·	2.7 km	MPC · JPL
459414	2012 NG	—	December 29, 2005	Mount Lemmon	Mount Lemmon Survey	H	470 m	MPC · JPL
459415	2012 PQ	—	March 7, 2005	Socorro	LINEAR	·	4.4 km	MPC · JPL
459416	2012 PO_{14}	—	January 4, 2006	Mount Lemmon	Mount Lemmon Survey	H	510 m	MPC · JPL
459417	2012 PY_{27}	—	April 4, 2010	WISE	WISE	·	3.8 km	MPC · JPL
459418	2012 QL_{44}	—	January 7, 2006	Mount Lemmon	Mount Lemmon Survey	H	590 m	MPC · JPL
459419	2012 QM_{48}	—	October 12, 2007	Mount Lemmon	Mount Lemmon Survey	EOS	2.0 km	MPC · JPL
459420	2012 QA_{50}	—	December 31, 2007	Catalina	CSS	H	550 m	MPC · JPL
459421	2012 RK	—	January 9, 2006	Mount Lemmon	Mount Lemmon Survey	H	390 m	MPC · JPL
459422	2012 RA_{9}	—	April 1, 2010	WISE	WISE	L5	10 km	MPC · JPL
459423	2012 RG_{9}	—	April 24, 2011	Kitt Peak	Spacewatch	·	2.9 km	MPC · JPL
459424	2012 RH_{39}	—	October 27, 2008	Kitt Peak	Spacewatch	·	2.4 km	MPC · JPL
459425	2012 SE	—	September 3, 2007	Catalina	CSS	H	390 m	MPC · JPL
459426	2012 SF_{4}	—	October 5, 2004	Kitt Peak	Spacewatch	H	540 m	MPC · JPL
459427	2012 SG_{25}	—	April 11, 2010	WISE	WISE	L5	9.1 km	MPC · JPL
459428	2012 SC_{50}	—	April 13, 2010	WISE	WISE	L5	9.6 km	MPC · JPL
459429	2012 SS_{51}	—	September 13, 2007	Kitt Peak	Spacewatch	H	520 m	MPC · JPL
459430	2012 SW_{63}	—	September 26, 2012	Mount Lemmon	Mount Lemmon Survey	·	3.4 km	MPC · JPL
459431	2012 TG_{5}	—	December 31, 2002	Socorro	LINEAR	H	510 m	MPC · JPL
459432	2012 TL_{14}	—	August 26, 2012	Kitt Peak	Spacewatch	L5	7.4 km	MPC · JPL
459433	2012 TG_{37}	—	March 15, 2010	Mount Lemmon	Mount Lemmon Survey	·	2.9 km	MPC · JPL
459434	2012 TA_{65}	—	February 9, 2010	Kitt Peak	Spacewatch	·	2.9 km	MPC · JPL
459435	2012 TE_{77}	—	October 12, 2005	Kitt Peak	Spacewatch	3:2	4.6 km	MPC · JPL
459436	2012 TV_{81}	—	August 24, 2012	Kitt Peak	Spacewatch	L5	7.3 km	MPC · JPL
459437	2012 TH_{89}	—	April 11, 2005	Mount Lemmon	Mount Lemmon Survey	·	3.0 km	MPC · JPL
459438	2012 TZ_{103}	—	September 19, 2011	Mount Lemmon	Mount Lemmon Survey	L5	7.7 km	MPC · JPL
459439	2012 TB_{146}	—	March 9, 2007	Mount Lemmon	Mount Lemmon Survey	L5	9.4 km	MPC · JPL
459440	2012 TU_{297}	—	October 15, 2012	Kitt Peak	Spacewatch	H	440 m	MPC · JPL
459441	2012 TN_{308}	—	May 21, 2006	Mount Lemmon	Mount Lemmon Survey	H	590 m	MPC · JPL
459442	2012 UC_{18}	—	October 17, 2012	Mount Lemmon	Mount Lemmon Survey	H	430 m	MPC · JPL
459443	2012 UR_{85}	—	September 16, 2006	Catalina	CSS	·	2.7 km	MPC · JPL
459444	2012 UF_{158}	—	March 31, 2011	Siding Spring	SSS	H	620 m	MPC · JPL
459445	2012 UC_{170}	—	November 21, 2001	Socorro	LINEAR	T_{j} (2.99)	4.8 km	MPC · JPL
459446	2012 VR_{1}	—	November 2, 2007	Catalina	CSS	H	530 m	MPC · JPL
459447	2012 VL_{38}	—	December 3, 2007	Kitt Peak	Spacewatch	H	550 m	MPC · JPL
459448	2012 VM_{38}	—	December 30, 2007	Kitt Peak	Spacewatch	H	490 m	MPC · JPL
459449	2012 WO	—	September 14, 1998	Socorro	LINEAR	H	580 m	MPC · JPL
459450	2012 WX_{4}	—	December 13, 2006	Mount Lemmon	Mount Lemmon Survey	·	760 m	MPC · JPL
459451	2012 WG_{32}	—	November 24, 2012	Haleakala	Pan-STARRS 1	APO +1km	1.1 km	MPC · JPL
459452	2012 XB_{6}	—	October 2, 2000	Socorro	LINEAR	·	3.0 km	MPC · JPL
459453	2012 XH_{21}	—	October 30, 2009	Mount Lemmon	Mount Lemmon Survey	·	1.3 km	MPC · JPL
459454	2012 XY_{55}	—	May 29, 2003	Kitt Peak	Spacewatch	H	560 m	MPC · JPL
459455	2012 XB_{56}	—	January 7, 2005	Socorro	LINEAR	H	550 m	MPC · JPL
459456	2012 XD_{111}	—	December 18, 2007	Mount Lemmon	Mount Lemmon Survey	H	610 m	MPC · JPL
459457	2012 XG_{134}	—	December 6, 2007	Mount Lemmon	Mount Lemmon Survey	H	690 m	MPC · JPL
459458	2012 XR_{134}	—	December 10, 2012	Haleakala	Pan-STARRS 1	APO	690 m	MPC · JPL
459459	2012 YZ_{2}	—	December 10, 2012	Catalina	CSS	H	620 m	MPC · JPL
459460	2012 YT_{3}	—	September 15, 2009	Catalina	CSS	H	430 m	MPC · JPL
459461	2013 AD	—	October 4, 2003	Kitt Peak	Spacewatch	·	1.4 km	MPC · JPL
459462	2013 AY_{52}	—	January 6, 2013	Catalina	CSS	APO	370 m	MPC · JPL
459463	2013 AO_{55}	—	February 8, 2002	Kitt Peak	Spacewatch	H	550 m	MPC · JPL
459464	2013 AZ_{72}	—	January 9, 2005	Catalina	CSS	H	550 m	MPC · JPL
459465	2013 AK_{112}	—	August 28, 2005	Kitt Peak	Spacewatch	·	690 m	MPC · JPL
459466	2013 BR	—	November 6, 2010	Mount Lemmon	Mount Lemmon Survey	L4	8.2 km	MPC · JPL
459467	2013 BZ_{16}	—	January 5, 2013	Mount Lemmon	Mount Lemmon Survey	H	600 m	MPC · JPL
459468	2013 BC_{22}	—	January 6, 2013	Kitt Peak	Spacewatch	NYS	1.3 km	MPC · JPL
459469	2013 BO_{43}	—	January 19, 2013	Mount Lemmon	Mount Lemmon Survey	·	660 m	MPC · JPL
459470	2013 BU_{45}	—	March 31, 2008	Catalina	CSS	H	560 m	MPC · JPL
459471	2013 BT_{54}	—	March 9, 2007	Kitt Peak	Spacewatch	·	600 m	MPC · JPL
459472	2013 CA_{7}	—	November 25, 2005	Kitt Peak	Spacewatch	·	600 m	MPC · JPL
459473	2013 CF_{16}	—	January 17, 2013	Mount Lemmon	Mount Lemmon Survey	·	1.1 km	MPC · JPL
459474	2013 CJ_{18}	—	April 14, 2010	Kitt Peak	Spacewatch	V	730 m	MPC · JPL
459475	2013 CX_{21}	—	December 4, 2008	Kitt Peak	Spacewatch	V	680 m	MPC · JPL
459476	2013 CL_{36}	—	September 22, 2004	Anderson Mesa	LONEOS	·	700 m	MPC · JPL
459477	2013 CE_{41}	—	September 25, 2008	Kitt Peak	Spacewatch	·	510 m	MPC · JPL
459478	2013 CT_{45}	—	February 5, 2013	Kitt Peak	Spacewatch	H	530 m	MPC · JPL
459479	2013 CP_{47}	—	February 5, 2013	Kitt Peak	Spacewatch	·	730 m	MPC · JPL
459480	2013 CR_{47}	—	June 9, 2007	Kitt Peak	Spacewatch	·	550 m	MPC · JPL
459481	2013 CR_{60}	—	January 19, 2013	Kitt Peak	Spacewatch	·	1.5 km	MPC · JPL
459482	2013 CO_{68}	—	January 4, 2006	Mount Lemmon	Mount Lemmon Survey	·	460 m	MPC · JPL
459483	2013 CZ_{73}	—	October 1, 2005	Kitt Peak	Spacewatch	·	570 m	MPC · JPL
459484	2013 CS_{75}	—	February 10, 2008	Mount Lemmon	Mount Lemmon Survey	·	2.3 km	MPC · JPL
459485	2013 CS_{79}	—	April 15, 2007	Kitt Peak	Spacewatch	·	580 m	MPC · JPL
459486	2013 CX_{103}	—	June 17, 2010	Mount Lemmon	Mount Lemmon Survey	·	1.4 km	MPC · JPL
459487	2013 CW_{110}	—	May 9, 2007	Kitt Peak	Spacewatch	·	560 m	MPC · JPL
459488	2013 CJ_{111}	—	October 26, 2005	Kitt Peak	Spacewatch	·	640 m	MPC · JPL
459489	2013 CH_{119}	—	May 9, 2010	Siding Spring	SSS	·	610 m	MPC · JPL
459490	2013 CY_{123}	—	April 8, 2006	Kitt Peak	Spacewatch	MAS	620 m	MPC · JPL
459491	2013 CC_{128}	—	January 19, 2004	Kitt Peak	Spacewatch	·	860 m	MPC · JPL
459492	2013 CO_{139}	—	January 9, 2013	Mount Lemmon	Mount Lemmon Survey	·	1.1 km	MPC · JPL
459493	2013 CH_{143}	—	February 24, 2006	Kitt Peak	Spacewatch	·	740 m	MPC · JPL
459494	2013 CM_{161}	—	September 28, 2011	Mount Lemmon	Mount Lemmon Survey	·	680 m	MPC · JPL
459495	2013 CJ_{168}	—	December 21, 2005	Kitt Peak	Spacewatch	·	730 m	MPC · JPL
459496	2013 CH_{172}	—	February 7, 2013	Kitt Peak	Spacewatch	·	760 m	MPC · JPL
459497	2013 CL_{174}	—	May 11, 2010	Mount Lemmon	Mount Lemmon Survey	·	550 m	MPC · JPL
459498	2013 CH_{175}	—	February 4, 2006	Mount Lemmon	Mount Lemmon Survey	·	690 m	MPC · JPL
459499	2013 CS_{191}	—	April 15, 1997	Kitt Peak	Spacewatch	·	550 m	MPC · JPL
459500	2013 CR_{195}	—	March 18, 2010	Mount Lemmon	Mount Lemmon Survey	·	550 m	MPC · JPL

== 459501–459600 ==
back to top

Designation			Discovery			Properties		Ref
Permanent	Provisional	Named after	Date	Site	Discoverer(s)	Category	Diam.	Ref
459501	2013 CD_{207}	—	October 29, 2005	Catalina	CSS	·	640 m	MPC · JPL
459502	2013 CB_{208}	—	September 4, 2008	Kitt Peak	Spacewatch	·	540 m	MPC · JPL
459503	2013 CC_{218}	—	December 1, 2008	Mount Lemmon	Mount Lemmon Survey	·	760 m	MPC · JPL
459504	2013 DC_{13}	—	September 21, 2011	Kitt Peak	Spacewatch	·	710 m	MPC · JPL
459505	2013 EC_{6}	—	March 3, 2013	Mount Lemmon	Mount Lemmon Survey	(2076)	830 m	MPC · JPL
459506	2013 EU_{10}	—	October 5, 2004	Kitt Peak	Spacewatch	·	860 m	MPC · JPL
459507	2013 EA_{13}	—	May 26, 2003	Kitt Peak	Spacewatch	V	750 m	MPC · JPL
459508	2013 EQ_{15}	—	November 24, 2008	Kitt Peak	Spacewatch	·	980 m	MPC · JPL
459509	2013 EQ_{17}	—	February 22, 2006	Catalina	CSS	·	680 m	MPC · JPL
459510	2013 ER_{18}	—	November 29, 2005	Kitt Peak	Spacewatch	·	610 m	MPC · JPL
459511	2013 ER_{25}	—	January 31, 1995	Kitt Peak	Spacewatch	·	730 m	MPC · JPL
459512	2013 EA_{26}	—	January 5, 2006	Kitt Peak	Spacewatch	·	460 m	MPC · JPL
459513	2013 EB_{29}	—	September 11, 2007	Mount Lemmon	Mount Lemmon Survey	·	690 m	MPC · JPL
459514	2013 EZ_{30}	—	May 19, 2010	Mount Lemmon	Mount Lemmon Survey	·	730 m	MPC · JPL
459515	2013 EW_{52}	—	February 5, 2013	Kitt Peak	Spacewatch	·	600 m	MPC · JPL
459516	2013 ER_{62}	—	November 2, 2011	Mount Lemmon	Mount Lemmon Survey	·	640 m	MPC · JPL
459517	2013 EN_{67}	—	February 3, 2009	Kitt Peak	Spacewatch	·	940 m	MPC · JPL
459518	2013 EB_{82}	—	September 22, 2008	Kitt Peak	Spacewatch	·	620 m	MPC · JPL
459519	2013 EP_{85}	—	February 17, 2013	Kitt Peak	Spacewatch	·	1.4 km	MPC · JPL
459520	2013 EY_{101}	—	March 11, 2013	Kitt Peak	Spacewatch	·	1.4 km	MPC · JPL
459521	2013 EY_{107}	—	July 9, 2003	Kitt Peak	Spacewatch	PHO	990 m	MPC · JPL
459522	2013 EV_{109}	—	October 15, 2007	Mount Lemmon	Mount Lemmon Survey	·	1.4 km	MPC · JPL
459523	2013 EM_{116}	—	May 1, 2009	Kitt Peak	Spacewatch	·	1.5 km	MPC · JPL
459524	2013 ES_{116}	—	October 24, 2011	Mount Lemmon	Mount Lemmon Survey	·	800 m	MPC · JPL
459525	2013 EL_{125}	—	December 21, 2008	Kitt Peak	Spacewatch	·	730 m	MPC · JPL
459526	2013 EM_{125}	—	December 3, 2008	Mount Lemmon	Mount Lemmon Survey	·	930 m	MPC · JPL
459527	2013 EW_{127}	—	March 12, 2013	Siding Spring	SSS	·	5.5 km	MPC · JPL
459528	2013 EG_{141}	—	October 23, 2008	Mount Lemmon	Mount Lemmon Survey	·	630 m	MPC · JPL
459529	2013 EY_{152}	—	March 17, 2009	Kitt Peak	Spacewatch	·	990 m	MPC · JPL
459530	2013 FG_{1}	—	November 2, 2008	Mount Lemmon	Mount Lemmon Survey	·	570 m	MPC · JPL
459531	2013 FB_{2}	—	February 17, 2013	Kitt Peak	Spacewatch	·	1.4 km	MPC · JPL
459532	2013 FL_{6}	—	November 8, 2008	Kitt Peak	Spacewatch	·	640 m	MPC · JPL
459533	2013 FW_{19}	—	February 24, 2006	Kitt Peak	Spacewatch	·	680 m	MPC · JPL
459534	2013 FC_{26}	—	February 14, 2013	Mount Lemmon	Mount Lemmon Survey	·	1.3 km	MPC · JPL
459535	2013 GE_{2}	—	February 27, 2006	Kitt Peak	Spacewatch	·	580 m	MPC · JPL
459536	2013 GN_{2}	—	December 28, 2005	Kitt Peak	Spacewatch	·	460 m	MPC · JPL
459537	2013 GF_{3}	—	April 25, 2006	Kitt Peak	Spacewatch	·	1.0 km	MPC · JPL
459538	2013 GL_{6}	—	September 28, 2011	Kitt Peak	Spacewatch	·	580 m	MPC · JPL
459539	2013 GG_{17}	—	October 15, 2007	Mount Lemmon	Mount Lemmon Survey	·	970 m	MPC · JPL
459540	2013 GY_{19}	—	April 21, 2006	Kitt Peak	Spacewatch	·	800 m	MPC · JPL
459541	2013 GC_{22}	—	March 13, 2013	Mount Lemmon	Mount Lemmon Survey	·	650 m	MPC · JPL
459542	2013 GP_{22}	—	April 25, 2006	Mount Lemmon	Mount Lemmon Survey	·	810 m	MPC · JPL
459543	2013 GX_{23}	—	April 2, 2013	Kitt Peak	Spacewatch	·	990 m	MPC · JPL
459544	2013 GJ_{25}	—	October 27, 2008	Kitt Peak	Spacewatch	·	670 m	MPC · JPL
459545	2013 GR_{25}	—	November 28, 2011	Mount Lemmon	Mount Lemmon Survey	·	790 m	MPC · JPL
459546	2013 GH_{26}	—	February 25, 2006	Kitt Peak	Spacewatch	·	610 m	MPC · JPL
459547	2013 GR_{28}	—	March 31, 2013	Mount Lemmon	Mount Lemmon Survey	·	940 m	MPC · JPL
459548	2013 GD_{31}	—	March 12, 2013	Kitt Peak	Spacewatch	·	960 m	MPC · JPL
459549	2013 GO_{32}	—	April 9, 2002	Anderson Mesa	LONEOS	NYS	1.2 km	MPC · JPL
459550	2013 GT_{43}	—	March 26, 2006	Mount Lemmon	Mount Lemmon Survey	NYS	710 m	MPC · JPL
459551	2013 GH_{46}	—	September 23, 2004	Kitt Peak	Spacewatch	·	620 m	MPC · JPL
459552	2013 GN_{46}	—	August 3, 2010	WISE	WISE	·	1.6 km	MPC · JPL
459553	2013 GA_{51}	—	January 7, 2006	Mount Lemmon	Mount Lemmon Survey	·	530 m	MPC · JPL
459554	2013 GZ_{69}	—	May 23, 2006	Kitt Peak	Spacewatch	·	800 m	MPC · JPL
459555	2013 GT_{74}	—	March 4, 2005	Mount Lemmon	Mount Lemmon Survey	·	1.1 km	MPC · JPL
459556	2013 GU_{78}	—	November 3, 2007	Mount Lemmon	Mount Lemmon Survey	·	850 m	MPC · JPL
459557	2013 GF_{81}	—	March 3, 2006	Mount Lemmon	Mount Lemmon Survey	·	580 m	MPC · JPL
459558	2013 GV_{82}	—	April 13, 2013	Mount Lemmon	Mount Lemmon Survey	EOS	2.0 km	MPC · JPL
459559	2013 GL_{85}	—	March 7, 2013	Catalina	CSS	·	1.4 km	MPC · JPL
459560	2013 GV_{89}	—	April 12, 2010	Kitt Peak	Spacewatch	·	910 m	MPC · JPL
459561	2013 GM_{92}	—	September 5, 2010	Mount Lemmon	Mount Lemmon Survey	·	640 m	MPC · JPL
459562	2013 GQ_{96}	—	May 24, 2006	Mount Lemmon	Mount Lemmon Survey	NYS	1.3 km	MPC · JPL
459563	2013 GW_{97}	—	November 11, 2001	Kitt Peak	Spacewatch	·	890 m	MPC · JPL
459564	2013 GF_{98}	—	March 31, 2009	Mount Lemmon	Mount Lemmon Survey	NYS	930 m	MPC · JPL
459565	2013 GH_{99}	—	March 20, 2007	Catalina	CSS	·	4.8 km	MPC · JPL
459566	2013 GO_{99}	—	April 7, 2013	Kitt Peak	Spacewatch	·	3.3 km	MPC · JPL
459567	2013 GU_{101}	—	March 16, 2013	Mount Lemmon	Mount Lemmon Survey	·	870 m	MPC · JPL
459568	2013 GY_{103}	—	January 25, 2006	Kitt Peak	Spacewatch	·	550 m	MPC · JPL
459569	2013 GW_{104}	—	March 2, 2006	Kitt Peak	Spacewatch	·	640 m	MPC · JPL
459570	2013 GF_{105}	—	March 26, 2006	Kitt Peak	Spacewatch	·	720 m	MPC · JPL
459571	2013 GB_{107}	—	October 24, 2011	Mount Lemmon	Mount Lemmon Survey	·	630 m	MPC · JPL
459572	2013 GC_{107}	—	September 15, 2007	Kitt Peak	Spacewatch	·	670 m	MPC · JPL
459573	2013 GE_{107}	—	April 7, 2013	Kitt Peak	Spacewatch	·	2.7 km	MPC · JPL
459574	2013 GD_{109}	—	October 21, 2011	Kitt Peak	Spacewatch	·	770 m	MPC · JPL
459575	2013 GF_{109}	—	February 1, 2009	Mount Lemmon	Mount Lemmon Survey	·	940 m	MPC · JPL
459576	2013 GB_{110}	—	February 2, 2006	Mount Lemmon	Mount Lemmon Survey	·	580 m	MPC · JPL
459577	2013 GF_{110}	—	March 18, 2013	Kitt Peak	Spacewatch	·	970 m	MPC · JPL
459578	2013 GZ_{110}	—	April 8, 2006	Kitt Peak	Spacewatch	·	770 m	MPC · JPL
459579	2013 GG_{112}	—	January 15, 2005	Kitt Peak	Spacewatch	·	1.2 km	MPC · JPL
459580	2013 GR_{112}	—	May 16, 2009	Mount Lemmon	Mount Lemmon Survey	·	1.3 km	MPC · JPL
459581	2013 GL_{115}	—	October 11, 2007	Mount Lemmon	Mount Lemmon Survey	·	630 m	MPC · JPL
459582	2013 GV_{117}	—	October 20, 2011	Mount Lemmon	Mount Lemmon Survey	V	460 m	MPC · JPL
459583	2013 GU_{118}	—	November 22, 2009	Mount Lemmon	Mount Lemmon Survey	·	3.3 km	MPC · JPL
459584	2013 GE_{123}	—	September 30, 2003	Kitt Peak	Spacewatch	MAS	630 m	MPC · JPL
459585	2013 GH_{124}	—	March 25, 2006	Mount Lemmon	Mount Lemmon Survey	·	520 m	MPC · JPL
459586	2013 GV_{126}	—	May 1, 2009	Mount Lemmon	Mount Lemmon Survey	·	1.7 km	MPC · JPL
459587	2013 GW_{126}	—	April 13, 2013	Mount Lemmon	Mount Lemmon Survey	·	1.2 km	MPC · JPL
459588	2013 GE_{127}	—	March 2, 2006	Kitt Peak	Spacewatch	·	670 m	MPC · JPL
459589	2013 GD_{130}	—	September 11, 2010	Kitt Peak	Spacewatch	·	1.2 km	MPC · JPL
459590	2013 GQ_{130}	—	March 16, 2013	Mount Lemmon	Mount Lemmon Survey	·	1.0 km	MPC · JPL
459591	2013 GS_{134}	—	March 23, 2003	Kitt Peak	Spacewatch	·	540 m	MPC · JPL
459592	2013 HV_{2}	—	April 12, 2013	Mount Lemmon	Mount Lemmon Survey	EUN	1.3 km	MPC · JPL
459593	2013 HX_{8}	—	December 4, 2008	Kitt Peak	Spacewatch	·	800 m	MPC · JPL
459594	2013 HZ_{9}	—	May 20, 2005	Mount Lemmon	Mount Lemmon Survey	KON	1.9 km	MPC · JPL
459595	2013 HF_{12}	—	July 25, 2010	WISE	WISE	ADE	2.0 km	MPC · JPL
459596	2013 HK_{13}	—	May 5, 2006	Anderson Mesa	LONEOS	·	850 m	MPC · JPL
459597	2013 HP_{20}	—	March 7, 2013	Catalina	CSS	·	1.4 km	MPC · JPL
459598	2013 HY_{20}	—	March 1, 2009	Kitt Peak	Spacewatch	·	1.1 km	MPC · JPL
459599	2013 HG_{22}	—	September 11, 2010	Catalina	CSS	·	870 m	MPC · JPL
459600	2013 HO_{23}	—	April 19, 2006	Catalina	CSS	·	750 m	MPC · JPL

== 459601–459700 ==
back to top

Designation			Discovery			Properties		Ref
Permanent	Provisional	Named after	Date	Site	Discoverer(s)	Category	Diam.	Ref
459601	2013 HQ_{24}	—	February 1, 2009	Kitt Peak	Spacewatch	·	860 m	MPC · JPL
459602	2013 HD_{25}	—	November 30, 2011	Mount Lemmon	Mount Lemmon Survey	V	630 m	MPC · JPL
459603	2013 HB_{26}	—	January 30, 2006	Kitt Peak	Spacewatch	·	640 m	MPC · JPL
459604	2013 HB_{28}	—	January 17, 2009	Kitt Peak	Spacewatch	·	1 km	MPC · JPL
459605	2013 HH_{30}	—	January 2, 2012	Mount Lemmon	Mount Lemmon Survey	·	1.4 km	MPC · JPL
459606	2013 HM_{31}	—	December 19, 2004	Mount Lemmon	Mount Lemmon Survey	V	520 m	MPC · JPL
459607	2013 HZ_{42}	—	October 15, 2007	Mount Lemmon	Mount Lemmon Survey	·	770 m	MPC · JPL
459608	2013 HP_{43}	—	January 31, 2006	Kitt Peak	Spacewatch	·	520 m	MPC · JPL
459609	2013 HM_{51}	—	September 10, 2007	Mount Lemmon	Mount Lemmon Survey	·	810 m	MPC · JPL
459610	2013 HU_{59}	—	February 1, 2009	Kitt Peak	Spacewatch	·	940 m	MPC · JPL
459611	2013 HV_{62}	—	September 11, 2007	Kitt Peak	Spacewatch	·	730 m	MPC · JPL
459612	2013 HS_{67}	—	October 27, 2003	Kitt Peak	Spacewatch	·	1.1 km	MPC · JPL
459613	2013 HM_{73}	—	May 5, 2006	Kitt Peak	Spacewatch	·	720 m	MPC · JPL
459614	2013 HN_{79}	—	October 30, 2007	Mount Lemmon	Mount Lemmon Survey	·	910 m	MPC · JPL
459615	2013 HM_{107}	—	September 11, 2007	Mount Lemmon	Mount Lemmon Survey	NYS	760 m	MPC · JPL
459616	2013 HS_{113}	—	October 23, 2006	Kitt Peak	Spacewatch	·	1.6 km	MPC · JPL
459617	2013 HN_{115}	—	August 30, 2005	Kitt Peak	Spacewatch	AGN	990 m	MPC · JPL
459618	2013 HJ_{116}	—	October 7, 2007	Mount Lemmon	Mount Lemmon Survey	·	820 m	MPC · JPL
459619	2013 HU_{126}	—	September 9, 2007	Mount Lemmon	Mount Lemmon Survey	·	910 m	MPC · JPL
459620	2013 HH_{130}	—	January 5, 2006	Mount Lemmon	Mount Lemmon Survey	·	750 m	MPC · JPL
459621	2013 HK_{138}	—	August 24, 2007	Kitt Peak	Spacewatch	·	690 m	MPC · JPL
459622	2013 HR_{139}	—	September 10, 2007	Catalina	CSS	NYS	1.0 km	MPC · JPL
459623	2013 JB_{2}	—	December 8, 2004	Catalina	CSS	T_{j} (2.99)	7.2 km	MPC · JPL
459624	2013 JF_{2}	—	December 22, 2008	Kitt Peak	Spacewatch	·	670 m	MPC · JPL
459625	2013 JG_{2}	—	March 9, 2006	Kitt Peak	Spacewatch	·	630 m	MPC · JPL
459626	2013 JP_{2}	—	March 26, 2009	Mount Lemmon	Mount Lemmon Survey	NYS	1.1 km	MPC · JPL
459627	2013 JC_{3}	—	March 24, 2006	Mount Lemmon	Mount Lemmon Survey	·	740 m	MPC · JPL
459628	2013 JZ_{3}	—	March 15, 2002	Kitt Peak	Spacewatch	·	1.1 km	MPC · JPL
459629	2013 JQ_{4}	—	January 11, 2008	Mount Lemmon	Mount Lemmon Survey	·	1.8 km	MPC · JPL
459630	2013 JB_{5}	—	April 19, 2006	Mount Lemmon	Mount Lemmon Survey	·	810 m	MPC · JPL
459631	2013 JF_{5}	—	January 1, 2012	Mount Lemmon	Mount Lemmon Survey	·	2.3 km	MPC · JPL
459632	2013 JD_{11}	—	May 6, 2006	Mount Lemmon	Mount Lemmon Survey	·	1.1 km	MPC · JPL
459633	2013 JS_{11}	—	October 3, 2006	Mount Lemmon	Mount Lemmon Survey	·	1.2 km	MPC · JPL
459634	2013 JX_{21}	—	January 18, 2009	Mount Lemmon	Mount Lemmon Survey	·	640 m	MPC · JPL
459635	2013 JJ_{25}	—	March 18, 2013	Kitt Peak	Spacewatch	·	980 m	MPC · JPL
459636	2013 JB_{28}	—	April 13, 2013	Kitt Peak	Spacewatch	·	3.9 km	MPC · JPL
459637	2013 JJ_{28}	—	January 29, 2009	Kitt Peak	Spacewatch	ERI	1.2 km	MPC · JPL
459638	2013 JA_{31}	—	October 18, 2006	Kitt Peak	Spacewatch	MAR	980 m	MPC · JPL
459639	2013 JR_{31}	—	December 22, 2008	Kitt Peak	Spacewatch	·	680 m	MPC · JPL
459640	2013 JE_{32}	—	December 30, 2008	Kitt Peak	Spacewatch	·	800 m	MPC · JPL
459641	2013 JT_{33}	—	February 22, 2009	Catalina	CSS	PHO	1.2 km	MPC · JPL
459642	2013 JY_{33}	—	May 15, 2005	Mount Lemmon	Mount Lemmon Survey	·	1.2 km	MPC · JPL
459643	2013 JK_{36}	—	October 30, 2010	Mount Lemmon	Mount Lemmon Survey	MAR	1.0 km	MPC · JPL
459644	2013 JC_{37}	—	March 11, 2005	Mount Lemmon	Mount Lemmon Survey	NYS	1.2 km	MPC · JPL
459645	2013 JG_{37}	—	September 10, 2010	Kitt Peak	Spacewatch	·	810 m	MPC · JPL
459646	2013 JM_{39}	—	April 19, 2006	Mount Lemmon	Mount Lemmon Survey	·	620 m	MPC · JPL
459647	2013 JZ_{41}	—	September 17, 2006	Catalina	CSS	·	1.5 km	MPC · JPL
459648	2013 JL_{42}	—	February 1, 2009	Mount Lemmon	Mount Lemmon Survey	·	870 m	MPC · JPL
459649	2013 JU_{46}	—	December 28, 2011	Kitt Peak	Spacewatch	·	2.0 km	MPC · JPL
459650	2013 JE_{48}	—	June 2, 2005	Siding Spring	SSS	·	1.2 km	MPC · JPL
459651	2013 JG_{49}	—	April 21, 2004	Kitt Peak	Spacewatch	·	2.2 km	MPC · JPL
459652	2013 JG_{53}	—	April 22, 2013	Mount Lemmon	Mount Lemmon Survey	·	1.1 km	MPC · JPL
459653	2013 JB_{61}	—	April 10, 2005	Mount Lemmon	Mount Lemmon Survey	·	1.1 km	MPC · JPL
459654	2013 KY_{3}	—	October 20, 2004	Catalina	CSS	EOS	2.3 km	MPC · JPL
459655	2013 KM_{4}	—	November 1, 2007	Mount Lemmon	Mount Lemmon Survey	·	1.1 km	MPC · JPL
459656	2013 KO_{4}	—	February 27, 2006	Kitt Peak	Spacewatch	·	660 m	MPC · JPL
459657	2013 KP_{5}	—	November 20, 2007	Mount Lemmon	Mount Lemmon Survey	·	1.1 km	MPC · JPL
459658	2013 KL_{7}	—	September 17, 1995	Kitt Peak	Spacewatch	NYS	1.1 km	MPC · JPL
459659	2013 KN_{7}	—	April 18, 2013	Kitt Peak	Spacewatch	·	3.0 km	MPC · JPL
459660	2013 KJ_{8}	—	May 4, 2002	Socorro	LINEAR	PHO	1.3 km	MPC · JPL
459661	2013 KS_{10}	—	December 15, 2006	Kitt Peak	Spacewatch	·	2.1 km	MPC · JPL
459662	2013 KM_{13}	—	March 1, 2009	Catalina	CSS	ERI	1.4 km	MPC · JPL
459663	2013 KB_{15}	—	April 29, 2009	Mount Lemmon	Mount Lemmon Survey	·	1.4 km	MPC · JPL
459664	2013 KU_{15}	—	March 10, 2005	Mount Lemmon	Mount Lemmon Survey	MAS	660 m	MPC · JPL
459665	2013 KV_{15}	—	May 25, 2006	Mount Lemmon	Mount Lemmon Survey	PHO	860 m	MPC · JPL
459666	2013 LQ	—	April 22, 2013	Mount Lemmon	Mount Lemmon Survey	·	640 m	MPC · JPL
459667	2013 LC_{9}	—	May 18, 2010	WISE	WISE	·	1.4 km	MPC · JPL
459668	2013 LD_{14}	—	February 11, 2004	Kitt Peak	Spacewatch	KON	2.2 km	MPC · JPL
459669	2013 LT_{14}	—	July 5, 2010	WISE	WISE	·	2.5 km	MPC · JPL
459670	2013 LM_{16}	—	May 25, 2006	Mount Lemmon	Mount Lemmon Survey	MAS	630 m	MPC · JPL
459671	2013 LS_{21}	—	December 31, 2011	Kitt Peak	Spacewatch	·	1.4 km	MPC · JPL
459672	2013 LM_{22}	—	January 15, 2004	Kitt Peak	Spacewatch	·	1.4 km	MPC · JPL
459673	2013 LQ_{22}	—	March 10, 2005	Kitt Peak	Spacewatch	·	1.1 km	MPC · JPL
459674	2013 LS_{22}	—	May 16, 2013	Mount Lemmon	Mount Lemmon Survey	·	2.0 km	MPC · JPL
459675	2013 LO_{24}	—	December 29, 2011	Mount Lemmon	Mount Lemmon Survey	EUN	1.2 km	MPC · JPL
459676	2013 LO_{28}	—	February 19, 2009	Kitt Peak	Spacewatch	MAS	580 m	MPC · JPL
459677	2013 LR_{32}	—	September 24, 2009	Mount Lemmon	Mount Lemmon Survey	EUN	940 m	MPC · JPL
459678	2013 LJ_{33}	—	May 19, 2013	Siding Spring	SSS	·	3.8 km	MPC · JPL
459679	2013 LS_{33}	—	March 23, 2006	Catalina	CSS	·	690 m	MPC · JPL
459680	2013 LV_{33}	—	May 3, 2005	Kitt Peak	Spacewatch	·	1.2 km	MPC · JPL
459681	2013 LL_{34}	—	February 28, 2009	Kitt Peak	Spacewatch	NYS	1.1 km	MPC · JPL
459682	2013 ML_{2}	—	May 2, 2013	Kitt Peak	Spacewatch	EOS	2.0 km	MPC · JPL
459683	2013 MY_{5}	—	June 18, 2013	Mount Lemmon	Mount Lemmon Survey	APO · PHA	270 m	MPC · JPL
459684	2013 MH_{6}	—	December 1, 2010	Mount Lemmon	Mount Lemmon Survey	·	1.6 km	MPC · JPL
459685	2013 MO_{6}	—	November 3, 2010	Mount Lemmon	Mount Lemmon Survey	·	2.2 km	MPC · JPL
459686	2013 MW_{8}	—	December 12, 2006	Mount Lemmon	Mount Lemmon Survey	·	2.0 km	MPC · JPL
459687	2013 MX_{10}	—	February 11, 2010	WISE	WISE	·	3.7 km	MPC · JPL
459688	2013 NT_{8}	—	February 21, 2007	Mount Lemmon	Mount Lemmon Survey	DOR	2.5 km	MPC · JPL
459689	2013 NG_{9}	—	August 28, 2009	Catalina	CSS	·	2.0 km	MPC · JPL
459690	2013 NT_{12}	—	November 20, 2009	Mount Lemmon	Mount Lemmon Survey	·	2.6 km	MPC · JPL
459691	2013 NY_{12}	—	July 28, 2009	Catalina	CSS	EUN	1.1 km	MPC · JPL
459692	2013 NK_{13}	—	June 22, 1996	Kitt Peak	Spacewatch	(194)	1.6 km	MPC · JPL
459693	2013 NR_{15}	—	January 16, 2011	Mount Lemmon	Mount Lemmon Survey	·	1.8 km	MPC · JPL
459694	2013 NR_{16}	—	March 3, 2005	Kitt Peak	Spacewatch	·	3.4 km	MPC · JPL
459695	2013 NY_{16}	—	June 27, 2001	Kitt Peak	Spacewatch	·	1.2 km	MPC · JPL
459696	2013 NW_{20}	—	January 9, 1999	Kitt Peak	Spacewatch	·	2.2 km	MPC · JPL
459697	2013 NV_{23}	—	March 17, 2010	WISE	WISE	·	3.8 km	MPC · JPL
459698	2013 OV_{8}	—	November 19, 2008	Kitt Peak	Spacewatch	CYB	3.2 km	MPC · JPL
459699	2013 OZ_{9}	—	March 15, 2012	Mount Lemmon	Mount Lemmon Survey	·	1.7 km	MPC · JPL
459700	2013 PG_{11}	—	July 29, 2013	Kitt Peak	Spacewatch	·	3.7 km	MPC · JPL

== 459701–459800 ==
back to top

Designation			Discovery			Properties		Ref
Permanent	Provisional	Named after	Date	Site	Discoverer(s)	Category	Diam.	Ref
459701	2013 PC_{13}	—	May 14, 2012	Mount Lemmon	Mount Lemmon Survey	·	3.4 km	MPC · JPL
459702	2013 PZ_{13}	—	December 15, 2006	Kitt Peak	Spacewatch	EUN	1.4 km	MPC · JPL
459703	2013 PR_{16}	—	February 25, 2006	Kitt Peak	Spacewatch	·	2.9 km	MPC · JPL
459704	2013 PC_{22}	—	October 10, 2008	Mount Lemmon	Mount Lemmon Survey	EOS	1.6 km	MPC · JPL
459705	2013 PE_{23}	—	March 12, 2007	Mount Lemmon	Mount Lemmon Survey	·	1.8 km	MPC · JPL
459706	2013 PR_{25}	—	June 7, 2013	Mount Lemmon	Mount Lemmon Survey	EUN	1.5 km	MPC · JPL
459707	2013 PQ_{30}	—	September 3, 2008	Kitt Peak	Spacewatch	·	1.6 km	MPC · JPL
459708	2013 PM_{32}	—	September 9, 2008	Mount Lemmon	Mount Lemmon Survey	·	2.1 km	MPC · JPL
459709	2013 PQ_{34}	—	September 30, 1997	Kitt Peak	Spacewatch	EOS	1.5 km	MPC · JPL
459710	2013 PZ_{35}	—	February 8, 2011	Mount Lemmon	Mount Lemmon Survey	·	1.9 km	MPC · JPL
459711	2013 PY_{36}	—	October 14, 2010	Mount Lemmon	Mount Lemmon Survey	·	2.5 km	MPC · JPL
459712	2013 PD_{37}	—	September 18, 2009	Mount Lemmon	Mount Lemmon Survey	·	1.3 km	MPC · JPL
459713	2013 PM_{39}	—	September 29, 2008	Mount Lemmon	Mount Lemmon Survey	·	2.8 km	MPC · JPL
459714	2013 PY_{40}	—	October 7, 2008	Kitt Peak	Spacewatch	·	2.2 km	MPC · JPL
459715	2013 PU_{41}	—	February 14, 2010	Catalina	CSS	·	4.5 km	MPC · JPL
459716	2013 PB_{45}	—	February 8, 2011	Catalina	CSS	TIR	3.0 km	MPC · JPL
459717	2013 PE_{46}	—	February 27, 2006	Kitt Peak	Spacewatch	·	1.4 km	MPC · JPL
459718	2013 PJ_{46}	—	February 5, 2011	Mount Lemmon	Mount Lemmon Survey	·	1.9 km	MPC · JPL
459719	2013 PQ_{46}	—	November 9, 2009	Kitt Peak	Spacewatch	·	1.6 km	MPC · JPL
459720	2013 PC_{48}	—	March 4, 2008	Kitt Peak	Spacewatch	·	1.7 km	MPC · JPL
459721	2013 PF_{49}	—	February 23, 2012	Kitt Peak	Spacewatch	·	2.1 km	MPC · JPL
459722	2013 PL_{49}	—	June 17, 2013	Mount Lemmon	Mount Lemmon Survey	·	2.3 km	MPC · JPL
459723	2013 PA_{50}	—	February 18, 2010	WISE	WISE	·	2.8 km	MPC · JPL
459724	2013 PM_{50}	—	January 8, 1999	Kitt Peak	Spacewatch	·	2.7 km	MPC · JPL
459725	2013 PA_{57}	—	March 24, 2003	Kitt Peak	Spacewatch	·	2.3 km	MPC · JPL
459726	2013 PC_{59}	—	September 17, 2009	Kitt Peak	Spacewatch	·	2.0 km	MPC · JPL
459727	2013 PN_{59}	—	July 13, 2013	Mount Lemmon	Mount Lemmon Survey	·	1.7 km	MPC · JPL
459728	2013 PH_{65}	—	January 13, 2011	Catalina	CSS	·	2.0 km	MPC · JPL
459729	2013 PQ_{71}	—	April 20, 2012	Mount Lemmon	Mount Lemmon Survey	MRX	1.0 km	MPC · JPL
459730	2013 PJ_{73}	—	January 8, 2010	Kitt Peak	Spacewatch	·	3.3 km	MPC · JPL
459731	2013 PS_{73}	—	June 9, 2013	Mount Lemmon	Mount Lemmon Survey	·	2.4 km	MPC · JPL
459732	2013 QK	—	July 26, 2008	Siding Spring	SSS	·	2.1 km	MPC · JPL
459733	2013 QM	—	November 21, 2009	Mount Lemmon	Mount Lemmon Survey	·	3.5 km	MPC · JPL
459734	2013 QO_{2}	—	April 15, 2004	Siding Spring	SSS	EUN	1.3 km	MPC · JPL
459735	2013 QV_{2}	—	August 29, 2006	Catalina	CSS	(2076)	880 m	MPC · JPL
459736	2013 QA_{6}	—	May 6, 2010	WISE	WISE	ULA · CYB	5.0 km	MPC · JPL
459737	2013 QT_{7}	—	September 28, 2008	Mount Lemmon	Mount Lemmon Survey	·	3.0 km	MPC · JPL
459738	2013 QT_{9}	—	March 5, 2008	Mount Lemmon	Mount Lemmon Survey	EUN	1.0 km	MPC · JPL
459739	2013 QE_{10}	—	May 21, 2006	Kitt Peak	Spacewatch	·	2.6 km	MPC · JPL
459740	2013 QG_{10}	—	March 2, 2011	Mount Lemmon	Mount Lemmon Survey	·	2.5 km	MPC · JPL
459741	2013 QA_{12}	—	October 9, 2008	Kitt Peak	Spacewatch	·	2.2 km	MPC · JPL
459742	2013 QS_{16}	—	February 21, 2007	Kitt Peak	Spacewatch	·	2.5 km	MPC · JPL
459743	2013 QD_{18}	—	March 10, 2005	Mount Lemmon	Mount Lemmon Survey	·	3.0 km	MPC · JPL
459744	2013 QL_{18}	—	April 20, 2012	Kitt Peak	Spacewatch	KOR	1.3 km	MPC · JPL
459745	2013 QS_{19}	—	February 20, 2010	WISE	WISE	·	3.1 km	MPC · JPL
459746	2013 QX_{24}	—	September 24, 2008	Kitt Peak	Spacewatch	·	2.9 km	MPC · JPL
459747	2013 QW_{28}	—	August 9, 2013	Kitt Peak	Spacewatch	·	2.3 km	MPC · JPL
459748	2013 QQ_{33}	—	December 20, 2009	Mount Lemmon	Mount Lemmon Survey	·	3.9 km	MPC · JPL
459749	2013 QF_{35}	—	August 4, 2008	Siding Spring	SSS	·	2.6 km	MPC · JPL
459750	2013 QP_{36}	—	January 30, 2011	Mount Lemmon	Mount Lemmon Survey	·	4.0 km	MPC · JPL
459751	2013 QO_{37}	—	October 23, 2000	La Silla	Barbieri, C.	·	1.5 km	MPC · JPL
459752	2013 QL_{42}	—	September 24, 2008	Mount Lemmon	Mount Lemmon Survey	VER	2.3 km	MPC · JPL
459753	2013 QX_{44}	—	April 14, 2007	Kitt Peak	Spacewatch	·	1.9 km	MPC · JPL
459754	2013 QD_{45}	—	September 27, 2009	Kitt Peak	Spacewatch	·	1.5 km	MPC · JPL
459755	2013 QJ_{46}	—	May 14, 2008	Mount Lemmon	Mount Lemmon Survey	·	2.0 km	MPC · JPL
459756	2013 QD_{48}	—	September 7, 2004	Socorro	LINEAR	·	2.3 km	MPC · JPL
459757	2013 QJ_{51}	—	October 10, 2004	Kitt Peak	Spacewatch	HOF	1.9 km	MPC · JPL
459758	2013 QC_{53}	—	September 10, 2004	Kitt Peak	Spacewatch	·	2.1 km	MPC · JPL
459759	2013 QA_{54}	—	September 10, 2004	Kitt Peak	Spacewatch	·	1.7 km	MPC · JPL
459760	2013 QK_{55}	—	May 14, 2012	Mount Lemmon	Mount Lemmon Survey	·	2.6 km	MPC · JPL
459761	2013 QV_{56}	—	March 10, 2005	Mount Lemmon	Mount Lemmon Survey	·	2.5 km	MPC · JPL
459762	2013 QJ_{57}	—	December 28, 2005	Mount Lemmon	Mount Lemmon Survey	AGN	1.4 km	MPC · JPL
459763	2013 QE_{58}	—	September 29, 2005	Mount Lemmon	Mount Lemmon Survey	·	960 m	MPC · JPL
459764	2013 QH_{58}	—	January 11, 2010	Kitt Peak	Spacewatch	VER	2.8 km	MPC · JPL
459765	2013 QF_{59}	—	October 2, 2003	Kitt Peak	Spacewatch	·	1.7 km	MPC · JPL
459766	2013 QD_{64}	—	September 18, 2009	Kitt Peak	Spacewatch	·	1.4 km	MPC · JPL
459767	2013 QC_{70}	—	June 2, 2008	Kitt Peak	Spacewatch	·	1.9 km	MPC · JPL
459768	2013 QD_{70}	—	March 1, 2008	Kitt Peak	Spacewatch	JUN	1.2 km	MPC · JPL
459769	2013 QQ_{70}	—	January 15, 2010	Kitt Peak	Spacewatch	·	4.1 km	MPC · JPL
459770	2013 QC_{76}	—	October 9, 2008	Mount Lemmon	Mount Lemmon Survey	·	3.3 km	MPC · JPL
459771	2013 QG_{76}	—	October 10, 2008	Mount Lemmon	Mount Lemmon Survey	EOS	1.7 km	MPC · JPL
459772	2013 QT_{83}	—	September 7, 2000	Kitt Peak	Spacewatch	JUN	1.2 km	MPC · JPL
459773	2013 QY_{91}	—	February 1, 2012	Kitt Peak	Spacewatch	·	1.1 km	MPC · JPL
459774	2013 RD_{1}	—	May 9, 2000	Kitt Peak	Spacewatch	·	3.5 km	MPC · JPL
459775	2013 RB_{5}	—	December 21, 2006	Kitt Peak	Spacewatch	·	1.6 km	MPC · JPL
459776	2013 RU_{7}	—	September 20, 2009	Mount Lemmon	Mount Lemmon Survey	·	1.1 km	MPC · JPL
459777	2013 RZ_{11}	—	March 14, 2011	Mount Lemmon	Mount Lemmon Survey	·	2.9 km	MPC · JPL
459778	2013 RQ_{12}	—	September 18, 2003	Kitt Peak	Spacewatch	·	1.8 km	MPC · JPL
459779	2013 RX_{12}	—	February 26, 2011	Kitt Peak	Spacewatch	·	2.9 km	MPC · JPL
459780	2013 RO_{13}	—	September 2, 2008	Kitt Peak	Spacewatch	·	2.0 km	MPC · JPL
459781	2013 RG_{17}	—	March 6, 1994	Kitt Peak	Spacewatch	·	3.4 km	MPC · JPL
459782	2013 RB_{25}	—	May 6, 2008	Mount Lemmon	Mount Lemmon Survey	·	1.5 km	MPC · JPL
459783	2013 RN_{26}	—	August 22, 2004	Kitt Peak	Spacewatch	·	1.8 km	MPC · JPL
459784	2013 RN_{27}	—	March 24, 2006	Kitt Peak	Spacewatch	·	2.6 km	MPC · JPL
459785	2013 RU_{30}	—	September 22, 2009	Kitt Peak	Spacewatch	·	2.1 km	MPC · JPL
459786	2013 RK_{34}	—	April 2, 2006	Kitt Peak	Spacewatch	·	2.4 km	MPC · JPL
459787	2013 RZ_{38}	—	March 11, 2005	Mount Lemmon	Mount Lemmon Survey	·	3.3 km	MPC · JPL
459788	2013 RA_{44}	—	October 9, 2007	Mount Lemmon	Mount Lemmon Survey	·	3.6 km	MPC · JPL
459789	2013 RR_{51}	—	May 6, 2008	Siding Spring	SSS	·	2.3 km	MPC · JPL
459790	2013 RE_{52}	—	September 13, 2007	Mount Lemmon	Mount Lemmon Survey	T_{j} (2.99)	3.6 km	MPC · JPL
459791	2013 RB_{57}	—	September 24, 2008	Catalina	CSS	·	3.0 km	MPC · JPL
459792	2013 RP_{57}	—	September 5, 2008	Kitt Peak	Spacewatch	·	2.0 km	MPC · JPL
459793	2013 RY_{57}	—	October 9, 2008	Mount Lemmon	Mount Lemmon Survey	·	2.3 km	MPC · JPL
459794	2013 RG_{60}	—	September 6, 1997	Caussols	ODAS	·	2.7 km	MPC · JPL
459795	2013 RP_{64}	—	July 29, 2008	Kitt Peak	Spacewatch	KOR	1.4 km	MPC · JPL
459796	2013 RQ_{64}	—	April 2, 2005	Mount Lemmon	Mount Lemmon Survey	·	3.0 km	MPC · JPL
459797	2013 RM_{67}	—	February 1, 2005	Kitt Peak	Spacewatch	·	2.7 km	MPC · JPL
459798	2013 RO_{68}	—	March 11, 2005	Mount Lemmon	Mount Lemmon Survey	·	3.0 km	MPC · JPL
459799	2013 RK_{69}	—	September 3, 2007	Mount Lemmon	Mount Lemmon Survey	TIR	3.6 km	MPC · JPL
459800	2013 RN_{77}	—	March 9, 2005	Mount Lemmon	Mount Lemmon Survey	·	2.7 km	MPC · JPL

== 459801–459900 ==
back to top

Designation			Discovery			Properties		Ref
Permanent	Provisional	Named after	Date	Site	Discoverer(s)	Category	Diam.	Ref
459801	2013 RO_{77}	—	September 2, 2013	Mount Lemmon	Mount Lemmon Survey	EOS	2.1 km	MPC · JPL
459802	2013 RE_{81}	—	February 8, 2011	Mount Lemmon	Mount Lemmon Survey	EOS	1.9 km	MPC · JPL
459803	2013 RT_{81}	—	November 20, 2009	Mount Lemmon	Mount Lemmon Survey	·	1.9 km	MPC · JPL
459804	2013 RA_{82}	—	September 12, 2007	Mount Lemmon	Mount Lemmon Survey	·	3.1 km	MPC · JPL
459805	2013 RS_{85}	—	September 13, 2007	Mount Lemmon	Mount Lemmon Survey	·	2.8 km	MPC · JPL
459806	2013 RS_{92}	—	March 11, 2005	Catalina	CSS	·	4.1 km	MPC · JPL
459807	2013 RR_{94}	—	November 17, 2009	Kitt Peak	Spacewatch	·	2.2 km	MPC · JPL
459808	2013 RT_{95}	—	September 12, 2007	Catalina	CSS	·	4.0 km	MPC · JPL
459809	2013 RO_{96}	—	January 13, 2005	Kitt Peak	Spacewatch	·	2.3 km	MPC · JPL
459810	2013 SN_{8}	—	January 8, 2010	Kitt Peak	Spacewatch	VER	2.9 km	MPC · JPL
459811	2013 SU_{17}	—	April 29, 2006	Kitt Peak	Spacewatch	·	2.9 km	MPC · JPL
459812	2013 SP_{23}	—	January 23, 2006	Kitt Peak	Spacewatch	·	1.8 km	MPC · JPL
459813	2013 SP_{30}	—	March 8, 2005	Mount Lemmon	Mount Lemmon Survey	PHO	1.1 km	MPC · JPL
459814	2013 SM_{33}	—	March 5, 2011	Mount Lemmon	Mount Lemmon Survey	KOR	1.3 km	MPC · JPL
459815	2013 SO_{33}	—	October 8, 2008	Kitt Peak	Spacewatch	EOS	1.5 km	MPC · JPL
459816	2013 SB_{34}	—	October 4, 1999	Kitt Peak	Spacewatch	·	2.4 km	MPC · JPL
459817	2013 SZ_{35}	—	September 24, 2008	Kitt Peak	Spacewatch	·	2.1 km	MPC · JPL
459818	2013 SP_{36}	—	September 11, 2007	Mount Lemmon	Mount Lemmon Survey	·	3.2 km	MPC · JPL
459819	2013 SW_{39}	—	January 27, 2007	Mount Lemmon	Mount Lemmon Survey	·	1.6 km	MPC · JPL
459820	2013 SA_{40}	—	July 20, 2007	Reedy Creek	J. Broughton	·	3.5 km	MPC · JPL
459821	2013 SH_{47}	—	November 25, 2009	Kitt Peak	Spacewatch	KOR	1.4 km	MPC · JPL
459822	2013 SQ_{52}	—	June 19, 2013	Kitt Peak	Spacewatch	·	2.8 km	MPC · JPL
459823	2013 SU_{52}	—	June 16, 2012	Mount Lemmon	Mount Lemmon Survey	·	4.6 km	MPC · JPL
459824	2013 SP_{54}	—	September 29, 2008	Mount Lemmon	Mount Lemmon Survey	·	2.7 km	MPC · JPL
459825	2013 SO_{62}	—	September 15, 2004	Kitt Peak	Spacewatch	NEM	2.3 km	MPC · JPL
459826	2013 SW_{63}	—	November 20, 2008	Kitt Peak	Spacewatch	·	3.1 km	MPC · JPL
459827	2013 SS_{64}	—	September 24, 2008	Kitt Peak	Spacewatch	·	3.5 km	MPC · JPL
459828	2013 SW_{65}	—	April 22, 2007	Kitt Peak	Spacewatch	·	2.5 km	MPC · JPL
459829	2013 SO_{67}	—	February 17, 2010	Catalina	CSS	·	4.4 km	MPC · JPL
459830	2013 SH_{72}	—	October 7, 2004	Kitt Peak	Spacewatch	·	1.9 km	MPC · JPL
459831	2013 SV_{72}	—	September 13, 2013	Catalina	CSS	·	3.0 km	MPC · JPL
459832	2013 SW_{73}	—	March 6, 2011	Mount Lemmon	Mount Lemmon Survey	EOS	1.8 km	MPC · JPL
459833	2013 ST_{75}	—	June 17, 2006	Kitt Peak	Spacewatch	·	3.0 km	MPC · JPL
459834	2013 SO_{77}	—	September 23, 2008	Mount Lemmon	Mount Lemmon Survey	·	3.0 km	MPC · JPL
459835	2013 SP_{83}	—	June 9, 2012	Mount Lemmon	Mount Lemmon Survey	·	2.6 km	MPC · JPL
459836	2013 SW_{83}	—	December 10, 2010	Mount Lemmon	Mount Lemmon Survey	EUN	1.6 km	MPC · JPL
459837	2013 SK_{85}	—	March 18, 2010	Mount Lemmon	Mount Lemmon Survey	·	4.9 km	MPC · JPL
459838	2013 TP	—	October 27, 2009	Mount Lemmon	Mount Lemmon Survey	·	2.0 km	MPC · JPL
459839	2013 TN_{2}	—	January 2, 2009	Mount Lemmon	Mount Lemmon Survey	CYB	4.4 km	MPC · JPL
459840	2013 TP_{8}	—	November 9, 2009	Mount Lemmon	Mount Lemmon Survey	·	2.4 km	MPC · JPL
459841	2013 TF_{13}	—	March 26, 2007	Kitt Peak	Spacewatch	·	1.9 km	MPC · JPL
459842	2013 TG_{15}	—	April 9, 2005	Kitt Peak	Spacewatch	·	3.4 km	MPC · JPL
459843	2013 TJ_{21}	—	January 23, 2006	Mount Lemmon	Mount Lemmon Survey	AGN	1.1 km	MPC · JPL
459844	2013 TS_{28}	—	February 28, 2009	Catalina	CSS	H	690 m	MPC · JPL
459845	2013 TT_{28}	—	September 17, 2013	Mount Lemmon	Mount Lemmon Survey	·	1.2 km	MPC · JPL
459846	2013 TK_{33}	—	March 11, 1999	Kitt Peak	Spacewatch	·	2.0 km	MPC · JPL
459847	2013 TP_{38}	—	May 4, 2005	Mount Lemmon	Mount Lemmon Survey	·	3.2 km	MPC · JPL
459848	2013 TA_{46}	—	January 7, 2010	Kitt Peak	Spacewatch	·	3.2 km	MPC · JPL
459849	2013 TN_{47}	—	September 20, 2001	Kitt Peak	Spacewatch	L5	7.1 km	MPC · JPL
459850	2013 TX_{47}	—	September 13, 2013	Mount Lemmon	Mount Lemmon Survey	·	3.0 km	MPC · JPL
459851	2013 TS_{52}	—	October 26, 2008	Kitt Peak	Spacewatch	·	3.1 km	MPC · JPL
459852	2013 TE_{67}	—	September 26, 2008	Kitt Peak	Spacewatch	·	2.7 km	MPC · JPL
459853	2013 TD_{70}	—	April 2, 2006	Kitt Peak	Spacewatch	·	2.3 km	MPC · JPL
459854	2013 TB_{79}	—	January 31, 2006	Kitt Peak	Spacewatch	·	2.1 km	MPC · JPL
459855	2013 TJ_{79}	—	October 8, 2008	Mount Lemmon	Mount Lemmon Survey	EOS	1.9 km	MPC · JPL
459856	2013 TU_{83}	—	September 11, 2007	Kitt Peak	Spacewatch	·	3.0 km	MPC · JPL
459857	2013 TE_{104}	—	March 9, 2005	Kitt Peak	Spacewatch	·	3.7 km	MPC · JPL
459858	2013 TO_{121}	—	October 5, 2004	Kitt Peak	Spacewatch	MRX	1.0 km	MPC · JPL
459859	2013 TO_{124}	—	April 30, 2006	Kitt Peak	Spacewatch	·	3.1 km	MPC · JPL
459860	2013 TY_{124}	—	October 22, 2008	Kitt Peak	Spacewatch	·	3.4 km	MPC · JPL
459861	2013 TL_{126}	—	November 8, 2008	Kitt Peak	Spacewatch	·	2.5 km	MPC · JPL
459862	2013 TW_{126}	—	January 25, 2006	Kitt Peak	Spacewatch	·	2.6 km	MPC · JPL
459863	2013 TR_{129}	—	March 3, 2000	Socorro	LINEAR	·	2.6 km	MPC · JPL
459864	2013 TG_{142}	—	May 31, 2006	Kitt Peak	Spacewatch	·	2.6 km	MPC · JPL
459865	2013 XZ_{8}	—	October 31, 2008	Kitt Peak	Spacewatch	centaur	70 km	MPC · JPL
459866	2013 YE_{54}	—	January 7, 2010	Kitt Peak	Spacewatch	·	1.5 km	MPC · JPL
459867	2013 YE_{62}	—	February 13, 2010	Catalina	CSS	EUN	1.5 km	MPC · JPL
459868	2013 YP_{96}	—	May 13, 2011	Mount Lemmon	Mount Lemmon Survey	T_{j} (2.99)	3.8 km	MPC · JPL
459869	2014 AQ_{4}	—	September 18, 2003	Kitt Peak	Spacewatch	·	1.6 km	MPC · JPL
459870	2014 AT_{28}	—	November 26, 2013	Haleakala	Pan-STARRS 1	centaur	20 km	MPC · JPL
459871	2014 ET_{6}	—	February 25, 2006	Kitt Peak	Spacewatch	MAR	1.2 km	MPC · JPL
459872	2014 EK_{24}	—	March 10, 2014	Catalina	CSS	APO · fast	80 m	MPC · JPL
459873	2014 FJ	—	December 9, 2010	Catalina	CSS	H	680 m	MPC · JPL
459874	2014 GS_{32}	—	September 20, 2011	Catalina	CSS	NYS	1.3 km	MPC · JPL
459875	2014 GR_{49}	—	April 9, 2014	Haleakala	Pan-STARRS 1	H	530 m	MPC · JPL
459876	2014 HW_{37}	—	December 21, 2006	Mount Lemmon	Mount Lemmon Survey	·	700 m	MPC · JPL
459877	2014 HL_{66}	—	July 29, 2011	Siding Spring	SSS	·	770 m	MPC · JPL
459878	2014 HX_{123}	—	June 13, 2004	Kitt Peak	Spacewatch	H	510 m	MPC · JPL
459879	2014 JH_{22}	—	May 27, 2010	WISE	WISE	·	2.4 km	MPC · JPL
459880	2014 JQ_{25}	—	September 19, 2012	Mount Lemmon	Mount Lemmon Survey	H	420 m	MPC · JPL
459881	2014 JT_{30}	—	May 2, 2014	Catalina	CSS	H	620 m	MPC · JPL
459882	2014 JQ_{37}	—	July 20, 2006	Siding Spring	SSS	·	1.3 km	MPC · JPL
459883	2014 JX_{55}	—	March 10, 2007	Mount Lemmon	Mount Lemmon Survey	·	2.6 km	MPC · JPL
459884	2014 KM_{34}	—	August 10, 2010	Kitt Peak	Spacewatch	·	2.1 km	MPC · JPL
459885	2014 KN_{39}	—	December 8, 2005	Kitt Peak	Spacewatch	H	480 m	MPC · JPL
459886	2014 KS_{45}	—	January 31, 2008	Catalina	CSS	H	560 m	MPC · JPL
459887	2014 KG_{51}	—	November 20, 2008	Mount Lemmon	Mount Lemmon Survey	·	660 m	MPC · JPL
459888	2014 KP_{78}	—	September 26, 2011	Kitt Peak	Spacewatch	·	860 m	MPC · JPL
459889	2014 KC_{87}	—	October 9, 2007	Catalina	CSS	H	500 m	MPC · JPL
459890	2014 KG_{92}	—	June 21, 2007	Mount Lemmon	Mount Lemmon Survey	·	820 m	MPC · JPL
459891	2014 KM_{101}	—	May 2, 2014	Mount Lemmon	Mount Lemmon Survey	·	770 m	MPC · JPL
459892	2014 LW	—	October 20, 2011	Mount Lemmon	Mount Lemmon Survey	NYS	800 m	MPC · JPL
459893	2014 LE_{11}	—	May 28, 2009	Kitt Peak	Spacewatch	·	2.3 km	MPC · JPL
459894	2014 LM_{11}	—	November 8, 2008	Kitt Peak	Spacewatch	·	730 m	MPC · JPL
459895	2014 LS_{12}	—	March 19, 2009	Mount Lemmon	Mount Lemmon Survey	(5)	1.5 km	MPC · JPL
459896	2014 LJ_{16}	—	January 25, 2009	Kitt Peak	Spacewatch	·	1.1 km	MPC · JPL
459897	2014 LF_{21}	—	October 27, 2006	Catalina	CSS	·	3.5 km	MPC · JPL
459898	2014 MQ	—	December 8, 2012	Catalina	CSS	H	530 m	MPC · JPL
459899	2014 MP_{2}	—	December 19, 2007	Mount Lemmon	Mount Lemmon Survey	·	2.1 km	MPC · JPL
459900	2014 MA_{4}	—	May 9, 2007	Kitt Peak	Spacewatch	(2076)	680 m	MPC · JPL

== 459901–460000 ==
back to top

Designation			Discovery			Properties		Ref
Permanent	Provisional	Named after	Date	Site	Discoverer(s)	Category	Diam.	Ref
459901	2014 MZ_{8}	—	August 26, 2011	Kitt Peak	Spacewatch	·	720 m	MPC · JPL
459902	2014 ME_{11}	—	November 17, 2001	Kitt Peak	Spacewatch	V	580 m	MPC · JPL
459903	2014 MN_{11}	—	June 20, 2010	WISE	WISE	·	1.7 km	MPC · JPL
459904	2014 MD_{12}	—	August 9, 2004	Socorro	LINEAR	·	680 m	MPC · JPL
459905	2014 MH_{12}	—	October 20, 2007	Mount Lemmon	Mount Lemmon Survey	·	1.4 km	MPC · JPL
459906	2014 MB_{13}	—	December 5, 2007	Kitt Peak	Spacewatch	·	1.6 km	MPC · JPL
459907	2014 MP_{13}	—	January 5, 2006	Kitt Peak	Spacewatch	·	730 m	MPC · JPL
459908	2014 MU_{17}	—	June 6, 2010	Kitt Peak	Spacewatch	·	1.9 km	MPC · JPL
459909	2014 MK_{20}	—	May 14, 2010	Mount Lemmon	Mount Lemmon Survey	·	1.0 km	MPC · JPL
459910	2014 MU_{20}	—	June 8, 2000	Socorro	LINEAR	·	2.7 km	MPC · JPL
459911	2014 MO_{21}	—	April 20, 2010	Mount Lemmon	Mount Lemmon Survey	·	1.3 km	MPC · JPL
459912	2014 MS_{22}	—	June 25, 2010	WISE	WISE	·	3.0 km	MPC · JPL
459913	2014 MH_{24}	—	November 20, 2007	Kitt Peak	Spacewatch	·	1.2 km	MPC · JPL
459914	2014 MN_{24}	—	February 12, 2008	Mount Lemmon	Mount Lemmon Survey	EUN	1.1 km	MPC · JPL
459915	2014 MC_{27}	—	February 5, 2009	Kitt Peak	Spacewatch	·	940 m	MPC · JPL
459916	2014 MP_{30}	—	November 14, 2001	Kitt Peak	Spacewatch	·	570 m	MPC · JPL
459917	2014 ML_{38}	—	September 27, 2009	Catalina	CSS	·	1.5 km	MPC · JPL
459918	2014 MT_{38}	—	August 21, 2007	Siding Spring	SSS	·	1.2 km	MPC · JPL
459919	2014 MV_{38}	—	March 2, 2010	WISE	WISE	·	3.9 km	MPC · JPL
459920	2014 ME_{40}	—	November 18, 2006	Mount Lemmon	Mount Lemmon Survey	·	2.1 km	MPC · JPL
459921	2014 MB_{42}	—	January 13, 2008	Mount Lemmon	Mount Lemmon Survey	H	400 m	MPC · JPL
459922	2014 MV_{42}	—	February 28, 2008	Kitt Peak	Spacewatch	·	2.2 km	MPC · JPL
459923	2014 MU_{46}	—	September 2, 2010	Mount Lemmon	Mount Lemmon Survey	·	1.8 km	MPC · JPL
459924	2014 MF_{50}	—	September 9, 2007	Siding Spring	SSS	·	1.5 km	MPC · JPL
459925	2014 ME_{51}	—	August 9, 2004	Socorro	LINEAR	H	540 m	MPC · JPL
459926	2014 MJ_{51}	—	October 8, 2007	Catalina	CSS	·	1.4 km	MPC · JPL
459927	2014 MF_{54}	—	August 13, 2010	Kitt Peak	Spacewatch	·	1.4 km	MPC · JPL
459928	2014 ML_{56}	—	May 14, 2005	Mount Lemmon	Mount Lemmon Survey	·	1.4 km	MPC · JPL
459929	2014 MV_{56}	—	November 18, 2006	Mount Lemmon	Mount Lemmon Survey	JUN	860 m	MPC · JPL
459930	2014 MK_{59}	—	December 15, 2010	Mount Lemmon	Mount Lemmon Survey	·	3.4 km	MPC · JPL
459931	2014 MZ_{60}	—	January 22, 2006	Mount Lemmon	Mount Lemmon Survey	·	2.8 km	MPC · JPL
459932	2014 MA_{62}	—	December 13, 2006	Kitt Peak	Spacewatch	·	2.1 km	MPC · JPL
459933	2014 MP_{63}	—	October 10, 2007	Mount Lemmon	Mount Lemmon Survey	·	880 m	MPC · JPL
459934	2014 MN_{65}	—	September 15, 2009	Kitt Peak	Spacewatch	EOS	1.8 km	MPC · JPL
459935	2014 NB_{1}	—	September 26, 2008	Kitt Peak	Spacewatch	·	610 m	MPC · JPL
459936	2014 NY_{2}	—	May 21, 2014	Haleakala	Pan-STARRS 1	·	2.1 km	MPC · JPL
459937	2014 NH_{12}	—	October 8, 2007	Anderson Mesa	LONEOS	V	780 m	MPC · JPL
459938	2014 NH_{19}	—	September 16, 2003	Kitt Peak	Spacewatch	·	2.9 km	MPC · JPL
459939	2014 NC_{21}	—	September 27, 2003	Kitt Peak	Spacewatch	THB	2.7 km	MPC · JPL
459940	2014 NR_{24}	—	December 15, 2007	Mount Lemmon	Mount Lemmon Survey	·	1.6 km	MPC · JPL
459941	2014 NK_{27}	—	January 23, 2011	Mount Lemmon	Mount Lemmon Survey	·	2.0 km	MPC · JPL
459942	2014 NY_{27}	—	October 17, 2009	Catalina	CSS	·	3.8 km	MPC · JPL
459943	2014 NN_{29}	—	February 19, 2009	Kitt Peak	Spacewatch	V	540 m	MPC · JPL
459944	2014 NE_{31}	—	September 24, 2011	Catalina	CSS	·	710 m	MPC · JPL
459945	2014 NA_{34}	—	October 20, 2006	Kitt Peak	Spacewatch	·	1.3 km	MPC · JPL
459946	2014 NM_{37}	—	October 28, 2011	Kitt Peak	Spacewatch	·	660 m	MPC · JPL
459947	2014 NQ_{37}	—	October 27, 2011	Mount Lemmon	Mount Lemmon Survey	·	880 m	MPC · JPL
459948	2014 NO_{41}	—	March 31, 2013	Catalina	CSS	·	2.9 km	MPC · JPL
459949	2014 NR_{42}	—	October 22, 2003	Socorro	LINEAR	·	4.4 km	MPC · JPL
459950	2014 ND_{46}	—	October 28, 2006	Mount Lemmon	Mount Lemmon Survey	·	1.0 km	MPC · JPL
459951	2014 NQ_{49}	—	November 9, 2009	Catalina	CSS	TIR	2.6 km	MPC · JPL
459952	2014 ND_{51}	—	August 18, 2006	Kitt Peak	Spacewatch	·	850 m	MPC · JPL
459953	2014 NC_{54}	—	December 27, 2011	Mount Lemmon	Mount Lemmon Survey	V	590 m	MPC · JPL
459954	2014 NH_{54}	—	December 18, 2007	Kitt Peak	Spacewatch	·	2.2 km	MPC · JPL
459955	2014 NB_{55}	—	December 4, 2007	Kitt Peak	Spacewatch	·	1.4 km	MPC · JPL
459956	2014 NK_{55}	—	January 20, 2008	Kitt Peak	Spacewatch	(5)	1.2 km	MPC · JPL
459957	2014 NV_{55}	—	October 24, 2011	Kitt Peak	Spacewatch	·	670 m	MPC · JPL
459958	2014 NS_{57}	—	August 8, 2010	Siding Spring	SSS	·	1.4 km	MPC · JPL
459959	2014 NC_{59}	—	September 13, 2007	Catalina	CSS	·	930 m	MPC · JPL
459960	2014 NW_{59}	—	August 8, 2004	Anderson Mesa	LONEOS	·	740 m	MPC · JPL
459961	2014 NY_{59}	—	December 13, 2006	Mount Lemmon	Mount Lemmon Survey	·	1.4 km	MPC · JPL
459962	2014 NN_{63}	—	August 26, 2001	Haleakala	NEAT	·	2.2 km	MPC · JPL
459963	2014 NQ_{65}	—	April 22, 2007	Kitt Peak	Spacewatch	·	680 m	MPC · JPL
459964	2014 OJ	—	April 7, 2013	Mount Lemmon	Mount Lemmon Survey	MAS	760 m	MPC · JPL
459965	2014 OA_{1}	—	October 11, 1996	Kitt Peak	Spacewatch	·	1.2 km	MPC · JPL
459966	2014 ON_{1}	—	January 6, 2006	Kitt Peak	Spacewatch	·	860 m	MPC · JPL
459967	2014 OC_{3}	—	September 26, 2009	Catalina	CSS	·	2.3 km	MPC · JPL
459968	2014 OU_{3}	—	April 6, 2008	Mount Lemmon	Mount Lemmon Survey	EOS	1.7 km	MPC · JPL
459969	2014 OK_{5}	—	November 14, 2007	Mount Lemmon	Mount Lemmon Survey	·	1.5 km	MPC · JPL
459970	2014 OX_{5}	—	October 2, 2000	Anderson Mesa	LONEOS	·	850 m	MPC · JPL
459971	2014 ON_{6}	—	March 18, 2010	Kitt Peak	Spacewatch	centaur	20 km	MPC · JPL
459972	2014 OB_{12}	—	December 10, 2005	Kitt Peak	Spacewatch	·	770 m	MPC · JPL
459973	2014 ON_{12}	—	December 25, 2005	Kitt Peak	Spacewatch	·	1.5 km	MPC · JPL
459974	2014 OB_{13}	—	December 17, 2007	Mount Lemmon	Mount Lemmon Survey	·	1.1 km	MPC · JPL
459975	2014 OL_{19}	—	December 30, 2008	Mount Lemmon	Mount Lemmon Survey	·	640 m	MPC · JPL
459976	2014 OV_{20}	—	January 16, 2009	Mount Lemmon	Mount Lemmon Survey	·	890 m	MPC · JPL
459977	2014 OE_{23}	—	July 18, 2007	Mount Lemmon	Mount Lemmon Survey	·	900 m	MPC · JPL
459978	2014 OE_{24}	—	September 28, 2003	Kitt Peak	Spacewatch	MAS	550 m	MPC · JPL
459979	2014 OR_{27}	—	November 3, 2007	Kitt Peak	Spacewatch	V	560 m	MPC · JPL
459980	2014 OB_{30}	—	June 25, 2014	Mount Lemmon	Mount Lemmon Survey	·	1.6 km	MPC · JPL
459981	2014 OF_{33}	—	September 18, 1999	Kitt Peak	Spacewatch	·	830 m	MPC · JPL
459982	2014 OM_{34}	—	September 12, 2007	Mount Lemmon	Mount Lemmon Survey	·	750 m	MPC · JPL
459983	2014 OP_{35}	—	May 26, 2006	Kitt Peak	Spacewatch	·	1.3 km	MPC · JPL
459984	2014 OB_{36}	—	October 14, 2007	Mount Lemmon	Mount Lemmon Survey	NYS	850 m	MPC · JPL
459985	2014 OJ_{37}	—	December 19, 2004	Mount Lemmon	Mount Lemmon Survey	·	940 m	MPC · JPL
459986	2014 OU_{37}	—	January 15, 1999	Kitt Peak	Spacewatch	·	620 m	MPC · JPL
459987	2014 OD_{38}	—	December 25, 2011	Mount Lemmon	Mount Lemmon Survey	·	910 m	MPC · JPL
459988	2014 OE_{38}	—	November 3, 2011	Mount Lemmon	Mount Lemmon Survey	V	600 m	MPC · JPL
459989	2014 OX_{38}	—	September 11, 2007	Mount Lemmon	Mount Lemmon Survey	·	790 m	MPC · JPL
459990	2014 OZ_{38}	—	April 27, 2009	Kitt Peak	Spacewatch	·	1.9 km	MPC · JPL
459991	2014 OE_{39}	—	November 22, 2009	Kitt Peak	Spacewatch	CYB	3.5 km	MPC · JPL
459992	2014 ON_{41}	—	December 1, 1996	Kitt Peak	Spacewatch	·	1.2 km	MPC · JPL
459993	2014 OD_{48}	—	May 27, 2014	Mount Lemmon	Mount Lemmon Survey	·	2.1 km	MPC · JPL
459994	2014 OU_{53}	—	October 24, 2011	Kitt Peak	Spacewatch	·	570 m	MPC · JPL
459995	2014 OY_{67}	—	March 5, 2008	Mount Lemmon	Mount Lemmon Survey	·	1.9 km	MPC · JPL
459996	2014 OD_{71}	—	January 12, 2000	Kitt Peak	Spacewatch	·	1.0 km	MPC · JPL
459997	2014 OK_{71}	—	June 20, 2010	WISE	WISE	ADE	2.0 km	MPC · JPL
459998	2014 OD_{73}	—	March 29, 2010	WISE	WISE	·	1.9 km	MPC · JPL
459999	2014 OJ_{79}	—	August 27, 2009	Catalina	CSS	EOS	1.9 km	MPC · JPL
460000	2014 OT_{79}	—	December 28, 2011	Mount Lemmon	Mount Lemmon Survey	·	1.1 km	MPC · JPL

back to top
