= (459883) 2014 JX55 =

Main-belt asteroid

(459883) 2014 JX_{55}
Discovery
- Discovered by: WISE
- Discovery site: WISE
- Discovery date: 28 June 2010

Designations
- Alternative designations: 2007 EB_{26} · 2010 MV_{87}
- Minor planet category: main-belt · (middle)

Orbital characteristics
- Epoch 27 April 2019 (JD 2458600.5)
- Uncertainty parameter 0
- Observation arc: 11.24 yr (4,106 d)
- Aphelion: 3.0725 AU
- Perihelion: 2.1810 AU
- Semi-major axis: 2.6267 AU
- Eccentricity: 0.1697
- Orbital period (sidereal): 4.26 yr (1,555 d)
- Mean anomaly: 51.957°
- Mean motion: 0° 13^{m} 53.4^{s} / day
- Inclination: 32.070°
- Longitude of ascending node: 271.86°
- Argument of perihelion: 32.457°

Physical characteristics
- Mean diameter: 2.8 km (est. at 0.1)
- Absolute magnitude (H): 15.9

(459883) 2014 JX_{55} is an asteroid from the central regions of the asteroid belt. After its first observations in 2007, where it was designated 2007 EB_{26}, it was thought to be an inner heliospheric asteroid and near-Earth object with one of the closest perihelions ever observed of any body orbiting the Sun, until further observations found differently. The object measures approximately 2.8 kilometers (1.7 miles) in diameter.

== Orbit and classification ==
=== Inner heliospheric asteroid ===
When the object was first observed as 2007 EB_{26} by the Mount Lemmon Survey in March 2007, it was thought to have the second-smallest positive semi-major axis (0.55 AU) of any known object orbiting the Sun, after Mercury. It was classified as an Apohele asteroid, which always stay inside of Earth's orbit, approaching within 0.116 AU (17,400,000 km; 10,800,000 mi) of the Sun approximately every 148 days, before leaving for a distance of 0.98 AU, making it a Mercury- and Venus-crossing asteroid. If these early orbital calculations had not turned out to be wrong, the object would still rank today among the inner heliospheric asteroids with the smallest known perihelia.

=== Orbital determination as main-belt asteroid ===
The object remained listed as an inner heliospheric asteroid for several years, until identifications with 2010 MV_{87} and 2014 JX_{55} and a subsequent improvement of the orbital uncertainty completely overturned previous calculations. 2014 JX_{55} is now a secured central main-belt asteroid orbiting the Sun at a distance of 2.2–3.1 AU once every 4 years and 3 months (1,555 days; semi-major axis of 2.63 AU). Its orbit has an eccentricity of 0.17 and an inclination of 32° with respect to the ecliptic.
