= List of minor planets: 449001–450000 =

The following is a partial list of minor planets, running from minor-planet number 449001 through 450000, inclusive. The primary data for this and other partial lists is based on JPL's "Small-Body Orbital Elements" and data available from the Minor Planet Center. Critical list information is also provided by the MPC, unless otherwise specified from Lowell Observatory. A detailed description of the table's columns and additional sources are given on the main page including a complete list of every page in this series, and a statistical break-up on the dynamical classification of minor planets.

Also see the summary list of all named bodies in numerical and alphabetical order, and the corresponding naming citations for the number range of this particular list. New namings may only be added to this list after official publication, as the preannouncement of names is condemned by the Working Group for Small Bodies Nomenclature of the International Astronomical Union.

Near-Earth obj.	MBA (inner)	MBA (outer)	Centaur
Mars-crosser	MBA (middle)	Jupiter trojan	Trans-Neptunian obj.
Unclassified

== 449001–449100 ==
Designation			Discovery			Properties		Ref
Permanent	Provisional	Named after	Date	Site	Discoverer(s)	Category	Diam.	Ref
449001	2012 BO_{54}	—	January 17, 2007	Kitt Peak	Spacewatch	·	2.0 km	MPC · JPL
449002	2012 BT_{54}	—	March 11, 2007	Mount Lemmon	Mount Lemmon Survey	·	1.3 km	MPC · JPL
449003	2012 BX_{54}	—	November 12, 2010	Mount Lemmon	Mount Lemmon Survey	·	2.9 km	MPC · JPL
449004	2012 BY_{59}	—	February 8, 2007	Kitt Peak	Spacewatch	EOS	1.6 km	MPC · JPL
449005	2012 BX_{75}	—	December 27, 2011	Mount Lemmon	Mount Lemmon Survey	·	2.8 km	MPC · JPL
449006	2012 BE_{78}	—	October 11, 2005	Kitt Peak	Spacewatch	·	1.4 km	MPC · JPL
449007	2012 BX_{80}	—	December 22, 2005	Kitt Peak	Spacewatch	·	3.1 km	MPC · JPL
449008	2012 BG_{81}	—	October 30, 2010	Mount Lemmon	Mount Lemmon Survey	·	3.1 km	MPC · JPL
449009	2012 BW_{89}	—	September 3, 2010	Mount Lemmon	Mount Lemmon Survey	EOS	2.2 km	MPC · JPL
449010	2012 BD_{95}	—	October 7, 2004	Kitt Peak	Spacewatch	VER	2.8 km	MPC · JPL
449011	2012 BU_{95}	—	September 27, 2006	Kitt Peak	Spacewatch	·	1.8 km	MPC · JPL
449012	2012 BV_{104}	—	September 25, 2009	Mount Lemmon	Mount Lemmon Survey	·	3.8 km	MPC · JPL
449013	2012 BG_{107}	—	January 26, 2012	Mount Lemmon	Mount Lemmon Survey	EOS	1.7 km	MPC · JPL
449014	2012 BJ_{109}	—	April 29, 2003	Kitt Peak	Spacewatch	·	1.9 km	MPC · JPL
449015	2012 BR_{110}	—	December 27, 2011	Mount Lemmon	Mount Lemmon Survey	·	3.4 km	MPC · JPL
449016	2012 BF_{112}	—	November 17, 1999	Kitt Peak	Spacewatch	THM	1.8 km	MPC · JPL
449017	2012 BR_{112}	—	November 17, 2006	Catalina	CSS	·	1.6 km	MPC · JPL
449018	2012 BN_{127}	—	December 24, 2011	Mount Lemmon	Mount Lemmon Survey	·	3.8 km	MPC · JPL
449019	2012 BB_{133}	—	January 5, 2012	Kitt Peak	Spacewatch	·	1.6 km	MPC · JPL
449020	2012 BC_{134}	—	September 17, 2010	Mount Lemmon	Mount Lemmon Survey	·	2.0 km	MPC · JPL
449021	2012 BJ_{136}	—	February 25, 2007	Kitt Peak	Spacewatch	·	2.4 km	MPC · JPL
449022	2012 BA_{138}	—	June 21, 2009	Kitt Peak	Spacewatch	·	2.9 km	MPC · JPL
449023	2012 BT_{138}	—	July 16, 2010	WISE	WISE	TRE	3.1 km	MPC · JPL
449024	2012 BX_{139}	—	January 18, 2012	Kitt Peak	Spacewatch	·	2.7 km	MPC · JPL
449025	2012 BD_{140}	—	November 30, 2005	Kitt Peak	Spacewatch	·	2.4 km	MPC · JPL
449026	2012 BR_{144}	—	January 18, 2012	Kitt Peak	Spacewatch	·	2.6 km	MPC · JPL
449027	2012 BQ_{148}	—	October 24, 2005	Kitt Peak	Spacewatch	·	1.8 km	MPC · JPL
449028	2012 BS_{151}	—	February 9, 2008	Catalina	CSS	EUN	1.3 km	MPC · JPL
449029	2012 CX_{2}	—	February 1, 2012	Kitt Peak	Spacewatch	·	3.4 km	MPC · JPL
449030	2012 CF_{7}	—	January 14, 2012	Kitt Peak	Spacewatch	·	3.5 km	MPC · JPL
449031	2012 CB_{10}	—	January 21, 2012	Kitt Peak	Spacewatch	·	3.0 km	MPC · JPL
449032	2012 CF_{16}	—	February 1, 2012	Kitt Peak	Spacewatch	·	3.4 km	MPC · JPL
449033	2012 CU_{18}	—	December 1, 2005	Kitt Peak	Spacewatch	·	3.3 km	MPC · JPL
449034	2012 CO_{28}	—	December 23, 2005	Socorro	LINEAR	·	2.3 km	MPC · JPL
449035	2012 CT_{36}	—	January 28, 2007	Mount Lemmon	Mount Lemmon Survey	EOS	1.4 km	MPC · JPL
449036	2012 CX_{37}	—	March 27, 2008	Kitt Peak	Spacewatch	·	2.3 km	MPC · JPL
449037	2012 CX_{42}	—	January 25, 2012	Kitt Peak	Spacewatch	EMA	2.6 km	MPC · JPL
449038	2012 CB_{46}	—	December 27, 2005	Kitt Peak	Spacewatch	·	3.0 km	MPC · JPL
449039	2012 CF_{47}	—	January 29, 2012	Kitt Peak	Spacewatch	EOS	2.0 km	MPC · JPL
449040	2012 CL_{50}	—	January 19, 2012	Haleakala	Pan-STARRS 1	·	2.6 km	MPC · JPL
449041	2012 CA_{57}	—	December 11, 2002	Socorro	LINEAR	·	1.8 km	MPC · JPL
449042	2012 DO_{5}	—	February 25, 2007	Mount Lemmon	Mount Lemmon Survey	·	2.5 km	MPC · JPL
449043	2012 DE_{7}	—	January 21, 2012	Kitt Peak	Spacewatch	GEF	1.1 km	MPC · JPL
449044	2012 DL_{13}	—	April 16, 2007	Catalina	CSS	·	1.7 km	MPC · JPL
449045	2012 DQ_{21}	—	February 19, 2012	Kitt Peak	Spacewatch	·	2.6 km	MPC · JPL
449046	2012 DZ_{23}	—	February 21, 2012	Kitt Peak	Spacewatch	·	2.3 km	MPC · JPL
449047	2012 DU_{27}	—	October 13, 2010	Mount Lemmon	Mount Lemmon Survey	·	2.5 km	MPC · JPL
449048	2012 DJ_{53}	—	February 2, 2006	Kitt Peak	Spacewatch	·	3.3 km	MPC · JPL
449049	2012 DX_{56}	—	February 25, 2012	Mount Lemmon	Mount Lemmon Survey	NAE	1.9 km	MPC · JPL
449050	2012 DH_{58}	—	January 30, 2006	Kitt Peak	Spacewatch	·	2.6 km	MPC · JPL
449051	2012 DP_{67}	—	February 24, 2012	Kitt Peak	Spacewatch	·	2.4 km	MPC · JPL
449052	2012 DO_{69}	—	May 7, 2008	Kitt Peak	Spacewatch	·	2.8 km	MPC · JPL
449053	2012 DK_{78}	—	October 7, 2004	Kitt Peak	Spacewatch	·	3.5 km	MPC · JPL
449054	2012 DL_{79}	—	August 17, 2009	Kitt Peak	Spacewatch	·	4.1 km	MPC · JPL
449055	2012 DR_{89}	—	January 22, 2006	Catalina	CSS	·	3.8 km	MPC · JPL
449056	2012 DB_{93}	—	January 23, 2006	Kitt Peak	Spacewatch	·	2.4 km	MPC · JPL
449057	2012 DS_{94}	—	October 31, 2010	Mount Lemmon	Mount Lemmon Survey	·	2.2 km	MPC · JPL
449058	2012 EM_{2}	—	February 17, 2007	Kitt Peak	Spacewatch	EOS	2.0 km	MPC · JPL
449059	2012 EZ_{4}	—	September 23, 2009	Mount Lemmon	Mount Lemmon Survey	·	3.4 km	MPC · JPL
449060	2012 EE_{16}	—	September 25, 2009	Kitt Peak	Spacewatch	·	3.5 km	MPC · JPL
449061	2012 FN_{4}	—	December 5, 2005	Kitt Peak	Spacewatch	·	2.3 km	MPC · JPL
449062	2012 FO_{6}	—	November 25, 2005	Catalina	CSS	·	2.0 km	MPC · JPL
449063	2012 FN_{8}	—	August 18, 2009	Kitt Peak	Spacewatch	·	2.8 km	MPC · JPL
449064	2012 FL_{16}	—	October 12, 2004	Kitt Peak	Spacewatch	·	2.3 km	MPC · JPL
449065	2012 FH_{17}	—	February 21, 2012	Kitt Peak	Spacewatch	·	2.7 km	MPC · JPL
449066	2012 FD_{24}	—	October 9, 2004	Kitt Peak	Spacewatch	·	2.9 km	MPC · JPL
449067	2012 FN_{31}	—	July 25, 2010	WISE	WISE	·	3.6 km	MPC · JPL
449068	2012 FG_{37}	—	December 10, 2010	Mount Lemmon	Mount Lemmon Survey	·	2.7 km	MPC · JPL
449069	2012 FS_{43}	—	July 31, 2009	Kitt Peak	Spacewatch	·	3.7 km	MPC · JPL
449070	2012 FP_{46}	—	January 21, 2006	Mount Lemmon	Mount Lemmon Survey	THM	2.0 km	MPC · JPL
449071	2012 FO_{51}	—	January 27, 2007	Mount Lemmon	Mount Lemmon Survey	·	3.5 km	MPC · JPL
449072	2012 FS_{56}	—	March 16, 2007	Mount Lemmon	Mount Lemmon Survey	·	2.2 km	MPC · JPL
449073	2012 FL_{59}	—	October 30, 2010	Kitt Peak	Spacewatch	·	2.1 km	MPC · JPL
449074	2012 FR_{62}	—	March 29, 2012	Mount Lemmon	Mount Lemmon Survey	AMO	490 m	MPC · JPL
449075	2012 FX_{68}	—	February 26, 2006	Kitt Peak	Spacewatch	·	2.3 km	MPC · JPL
449076	2012 GN_{9}	—	September 1, 1998	Kitt Peak	Spacewatch	·	3.4 km	MPC · JPL
449077	2012 HV_{7}	—	November 10, 2004	Kitt Peak	Spacewatch	·	3.3 km	MPC · JPL
449078	2012 HT_{40}	—	March 27, 2012	Mount Lemmon	Mount Lemmon Survey	·	3.5 km	MPC · JPL
449079	2012 HG_{55}	—	September 27, 2009	Kitt Peak	Spacewatch	·	3.3 km	MPC · JPL
449080	2012 HF_{75}	—	November 11, 2004	Kitt Peak	Spacewatch	·	4.1 km	MPC · JPL
449081	2012 JS_{25}	—	December 11, 2010	Mount Lemmon	Mount Lemmon Survey	·	3.0 km	MPC · JPL
449082	2012 KX_{1}	—	March 25, 2006	Kitt Peak	Spacewatch	·	3.2 km	MPC · JPL
449083	2012 PY_{17}	—	January 26, 2006	Mount Lemmon	Mount Lemmon Survey	H	630 m	MPC · JPL
449084	2012 QX_{14}	—	September 21, 1998	Caussols	ODAS	H	570 m	MPC · JPL
449085	2012 QV_{29}	—	February 25, 2011	Mount Lemmon	Mount Lemmon Survey	·	950 m	MPC · JPL
449086	2012 RY_{16}	—	October 21, 2009	Mount Lemmon	Mount Lemmon Survey	·	780 m	MPC · JPL
449087	2012 RU_{34}	—	September 15, 2012	Kitt Peak	Spacewatch	(883)	760 m	MPC · JPL
449088	2012 SN	—	June 15, 2009	Kitt Peak	Spacewatch	H	480 m	MPC · JPL
449089	2012 SC_{22}	—	September 19, 2012	Mount Lemmon	Mount Lemmon Survey	APO	330 m	MPC · JPL
449090	2012 TX_{102}	—	October 9, 2012	Mount Lemmon	Mount Lemmon Survey	·	630 m	MPC · JPL
449091	2012 TK_{143}	—	September 23, 2012	Mount Lemmon	Mount Lemmon Survey	H	540 m	MPC · JPL
449092	2012 TT_{143}	—	March 2, 2011	Catalina	CSS	H	610 m	MPC · JPL
449093	2012 TM_{193}	—	October 31, 1999	Kitt Peak	Spacewatch	·	480 m	MPC · JPL
449094	2012 TY_{226}	—	October 28, 2005	Kitt Peak	Spacewatch	·	1.1 km	MPC · JPL
449095	2012 TL_{247}	—	December 15, 2006	Kitt Peak	Spacewatch	·	620 m	MPC · JPL
449096	2012 UB_{28}	—	March 29, 2011	Kitt Peak	Spacewatch	·	1.0 km	MPC · JPL
449097	2012 UT_{68}	—	October 22, 2011	Mount Lemmon	Mount Lemmon Survey	centaur	70 km	MPC · JPL
449098	2012 UN_{89}	—	October 21, 1995	Kitt Peak	Spacewatch	·	630 m	MPC · JPL
449099	2012 UU_{91}	—	October 16, 2012	Mount Lemmon	Mount Lemmon Survey	·	700 m	MPC · JPL
449100	2012 UH_{147}	—	March 30, 2011	Mount Lemmon	Mount Lemmon Survey	·	560 m	MPC · JPL

== 449101–449200 ==
back to top

Designation			Discovery			Properties		Ref
Permanent	Provisional	Named after	Date	Site	Discoverer(s)	Category	Diam.	Ref
449101	2012 UO_{162}	—	October 16, 1999	Kitt Peak	Spacewatch	·	720 m	MPC · JPL
449102	2012 UQ_{167}	—	December 20, 2005	Socorro	LINEAR	PHO	1.1 km	MPC · JPL
449103	2012 VJ_{10}	—	November 4, 2012	Kitt Peak	Spacewatch	·	700 m	MPC · JPL
449104	2012 VH_{35}	—	October 17, 2012	Mount Lemmon	Mount Lemmon Survey	·	790 m	MPC · JPL
449105	2012 VQ_{35}	—	October 20, 2012	Kitt Peak	Spacewatch	·	640 m	MPC · JPL
449106	2012 VR_{70}	—	October 30, 2005	Kitt Peak	Spacewatch	·	630 m	MPC · JPL
449107	2012 VJ_{82}	—	November 14, 2012	Nogales	M. Schwartz, P. R. Holvorcem	APO	400 m	MPC · JPL
449108	2012 WS_{1}	—	January 10, 2007	Kitt Peak	Spacewatch	·	800 m	MPC · JPL
449109	2012 WR_{13}	—	February 10, 2007	Mount Lemmon	Mount Lemmon Survey	·	490 m	MPC · JPL
449110	2012 WP_{32}	—	January 28, 2003	Kitt Peak	Spacewatch	·	700 m	MPC · JPL
449111	2012 XJ_{45}	—	September 26, 2005	Kitt Peak	Spacewatch	·	810 m	MPC · JPL
449112	2012 XN_{53}	—	December 6, 2012	Mount Lemmon	Mount Lemmon Survey	·	1.6 km	MPC · JPL
449113	2012 XQ_{60}	—	January 17, 2007	Kitt Peak	Spacewatch	·	630 m	MPC · JPL
449114	2012 XO_{83}	—	December 6, 2012	Kitt Peak	Spacewatch	·	1.5 km	MPC · JPL
449115	2012 XY_{93}	—	April 6, 2011	Kitt Peak	Spacewatch	·	970 m	MPC · JPL
449116	2012 XF_{96}	—	December 8, 2005	Mount Lemmon	Mount Lemmon Survey	·	840 m	MPC · JPL
449117	2012 XE_{118}	—	December 8, 2012	Kitt Peak	Spacewatch	·	730 m	MPC · JPL
449118	2012 XJ_{141}	—	December 18, 2009	Mount Lemmon	Mount Lemmon Survey	·	520 m	MPC · JPL
449119	2012 YJ_{1}	—	December 4, 2007	Kitt Peak	Spacewatch	·	1.3 km	MPC · JPL
449120	2012 YP_{1}	—	December 18, 2012	Socorro	LINEAR	·	1.2 km	MPC · JPL
449121	2013 AZ_{4}	—	February 14, 2005	Kitt Peak	Spacewatch	·	1.2 km	MPC · JPL
449122	2013 AG_{6}	—	March 20, 2010	Siding Spring	SSS	·	1.0 km	MPC · JPL
449123	2013 AL_{8}	—	November 1, 2008	Mount Lemmon	Mount Lemmon Survey	·	1.6 km	MPC · JPL
449124	2013 AE_{12}	—	October 2, 2008	Mount Lemmon	Mount Lemmon Survey	·	720 m	MPC · JPL
449125	2013 AZ_{13}	—	September 29, 2008	Mount Lemmon	Mount Lemmon Survey	NYS	1.1 km	MPC · JPL
449126	2013 AA_{14}	—	November 22, 2005	Kitt Peak	Spacewatch	·	610 m	MPC · JPL
449127	2013 AS_{15}	—	September 25, 2005	Kitt Peak	Spacewatch	·	680 m	MPC · JPL
449128	2013 AK_{16}	—	February 7, 2006	Mount Lemmon	Mount Lemmon Survey	·	1.1 km	MPC · JPL
449129	2013 AQ_{18}	—	January 25, 2009	Kitt Peak	Spacewatch	·	1.4 km	MPC · JPL
449130	2013 AL_{24}	—	October 1, 2008	Mount Lemmon	Mount Lemmon Survey	·	870 m	MPC · JPL
449131	2013 AV_{29}	—	January 6, 2005	Catalina	CSS	·	2.8 km	MPC · JPL
449132	2013 AR_{31}	—	December 10, 2005	Kitt Peak	Spacewatch	·	730 m	MPC · JPL
449133	2013 AG_{36}	—	April 14, 2010	Mount Lemmon	Mount Lemmon Survey	·	740 m	MPC · JPL
449134	2013 AD_{40}	—	January 18, 2009	Kitt Peak	Spacewatch	·	2.7 km	MPC · JPL
449135	2013 AS_{47}	—	April 2, 2006	Kitt Peak	Spacewatch	NYS	1.2 km	MPC · JPL
449136	2013 AQ_{53}	—	October 24, 2008	Kitt Peak	Spacewatch	·	1.2 km	MPC · JPL
449137	2013 AP_{54}	—	January 5, 1994	Kitt Peak	Spacewatch	MAS	660 m	MPC · JPL
449138	2013 AV_{56}	—	April 17, 2010	WISE	WISE	BRG	2.2 km	MPC · JPL
449139	2013 AX_{56}	—	February 24, 2006	Kitt Peak	Spacewatch	NYS	720 m	MPC · JPL
449140	2013 AE_{57}	—	April 9, 2010	Kitt Peak	Spacewatch	·	1.2 km	MPC · JPL
449141	2013 AK_{58}	—	March 18, 2005	Catalina	CSS	·	1.5 km	MPC · JPL
449142	2013 AC_{62}	—	December 2, 2005	Kitt Peak	Spacewatch	·	800 m	MPC · JPL
449143	2013 AH_{68}	—	January 10, 2013	Kitt Peak	Spacewatch	·	2.0 km	MPC · JPL
449144	2013 AG_{71}	—	January 28, 2006	Kitt Peak	Spacewatch	·	1.1 km	MPC · JPL
449145	2013 AZ_{77}	—	November 10, 2004	Kitt Peak	Spacewatch	·	1.1 km	MPC · JPL
449146	2013 AL_{80}	—	April 20, 2006	Kitt Peak	Spacewatch	V	680 m	MPC · JPL
449147	2013 AZ_{87}	—	January 7, 2006	Mount Lemmon	Mount Lemmon Survey	·	620 m	MPC · JPL
449148	2013 AZ_{91}	—	April 16, 2007	Catalina	CSS	·	850 m	MPC · JPL
449149	2013 AX_{93}	—	January 9, 2013	Kitt Peak	Spacewatch	·	2.5 km	MPC · JPL
449150	2013 AM_{94}	—	December 24, 1998	Kitt Peak	Spacewatch	·	970 m	MPC · JPL
449151	2013 AD_{95}	—	January 12, 2002	Kitt Peak	Spacewatch	·	1.4 km	MPC · JPL
449152	2013 AT_{95}	—	September 13, 2007	Mount Lemmon	Mount Lemmon Survey	NYS	1.2 km	MPC · JPL
449153	2013 AK_{98}	—	September 25, 2008	Mount Lemmon	Mount Lemmon Survey	·	640 m	MPC · JPL
449154	2013 AT_{116}	—	January 4, 2013	Kitt Peak	Spacewatch	·	1.0 km	MPC · JPL
449155	2013 AP_{120}	—	October 15, 2007	Mount Lemmon	Mount Lemmon Survey	·	1.3 km	MPC · JPL
449156	2013 AZ_{121}	—	January 6, 2013	Kitt Peak	Spacewatch	·	1.3 km	MPC · JPL
449157	2013 AP_{122}	—	October 7, 2008	Mount Lemmon	Mount Lemmon Survey	·	1.1 km	MPC · JPL
449158	2013 AH_{123}	—	October 21, 2001	Kitt Peak	Spacewatch	NYS	650 m	MPC · JPL
449159	2013 AW_{123}	—	December 26, 2005	Mount Lemmon	Mount Lemmon Survey	·	710 m	MPC · JPL
449160	2013 AH_{126}	—	January 27, 2010	WISE	WISE	PHO	2.3 km	MPC · JPL
449161	2013 AK_{130}	—	February 8, 2002	Socorro	LINEAR	·	1.4 km	MPC · JPL
449162	2013 AB_{131}	—	January 23, 2006	Kitt Peak	Spacewatch	·	760 m	MPC · JPL
449163	2013 AB_{132}	—	September 14, 2009	Catalina	CSS	·	4.3 km	MPC · JPL
449164	2013 AE_{156}	—	October 14, 2007	Mount Lemmon	Mount Lemmon Survey	·	1.5 km	MPC · JPL
449165	2013 AY_{156}	—	October 20, 2008	Mount Lemmon	Mount Lemmon Survey	·	1.2 km	MPC · JPL
449166	2013 AS_{174}	—	November 14, 1998	Kitt Peak	Spacewatch	·	1.9 km	MPC · JPL
449167	2013 BD_{8}	—	September 23, 2008	Mount Lemmon	Mount Lemmon Survey	·	880 m	MPC · JPL
449168	2013 BA_{23}	—	May 28, 2011	Mount Lemmon	Mount Lemmon Survey	·	1.2 km	MPC · JPL
449169	2013 BA_{26}	—	January 18, 2013	Mount Lemmon	Mount Lemmon Survey	·	1.0 km	MPC · JPL
449170	2013 BV_{29}	—	January 31, 2009	Kitt Peak	Spacewatch	·	1.5 km	MPC · JPL
449171	2013 BB_{35}	—	November 6, 2008	Kitt Peak	Spacewatch	V	740 m	MPC · JPL
449172	2013 BC_{41}	—	February 4, 2000	Kitt Peak	Spacewatch	EUN	1.3 km	MPC · JPL
449173	2013 BK_{56}	—	December 28, 2005	Kitt Peak	Spacewatch	·	670 m	MPC · JPL
449174	2013 BM_{61}	—	March 26, 2006	Kitt Peak	Spacewatch	·	950 m	MPC · JPL
449175	2013 BL_{63}	—	March 19, 2009	Mount Lemmon	Mount Lemmon Survey	·	1.1 km	MPC · JPL
449176	2013 BU_{63}	—	October 22, 2008	Kitt Peak	Spacewatch	·	850 m	MPC · JPL
449177	2013 BM_{65}	—	July 30, 2008	Mount Lemmon	Mount Lemmon Survey	·	470 m	MPC · JPL
449178	2013 BG_{66}	—	May 31, 2010	WISE	WISE	·	3.4 km	MPC · JPL
449179	2013 BA_{68}	—	November 1, 2007	Mount Lemmon	Mount Lemmon Survey	·	1.1 km	MPC · JPL
449180	2013 BH_{75}	—	December 1, 2008	Kitt Peak	Spacewatch	V	610 m	MPC · JPL
449181	2013 BA_{80}	—	January 4, 2013	Kitt Peak	Spacewatch	·	610 m	MPC · JPL
449182	2013 CV_{1}	—	October 20, 2008	Kitt Peak	Spacewatch	·	820 m	MPC · JPL
449183	2013 CW_{1}	—	February 2, 2006	Kitt Peak	Spacewatch	V	730 m	MPC · JPL
449184	2013 CY_{8}	—	April 25, 2007	Kitt Peak	Spacewatch	·	640 m	MPC · JPL
449185	2013 CT_{11}	—	January 19, 2013	Kitt Peak	Spacewatch	RAF	940 m	MPC · JPL
449186	2013 CN_{12}	—	January 18, 2013	Kitt Peak	Spacewatch	·	1.8 km	MPC · JPL
449187	2013 CX_{12}	—	March 4, 2005	Mount Lemmon	Mount Lemmon Survey	·	860 m	MPC · JPL
449188	2013 CW_{14}	—	February 21, 2006	Mount Lemmon	Mount Lemmon Survey	·	770 m	MPC · JPL
449189	2013 CV_{18}	—	November 24, 2008	Mount Lemmon	Mount Lemmon Survey	·	1.3 km	MPC · JPL
449190	2013 CM_{23}	—	April 10, 2010	WISE	WISE	·	2.3 km	MPC · JPL
449191	2013 CO_{23}	—	December 1, 2008	Kitt Peak	Spacewatch	NYS	1.0 km	MPC · JPL
449192	2013 CQ_{23}	—	March 24, 2006	Mount Lemmon	Mount Lemmon Survey	NYS	1.2 km	MPC · JPL
449193	2013 CN_{24}	—	March 1, 2008	Kitt Peak	Spacewatch	·	3.1 km	MPC · JPL
449194	2013 CM_{27}	—	December 1, 2005	Mount Lemmon	Mount Lemmon Survey	·	1.0 km	MPC · JPL
449195	2013 CY_{28}	—	January 15, 2009	Kitt Peak	Spacewatch	·	1.2 km	MPC · JPL
449196	2013 CN_{34}	—	August 27, 2006	Kitt Peak	Spacewatch	·	2.1 km	MPC · JPL
449197	2013 CV_{36}	—	March 27, 2009	Catalina	CSS	ADE	2.3 km	MPC · JPL
449198	2013 CV_{44}	—	September 16, 2003	Kitt Peak	Spacewatch	·	1.1 km	MPC · JPL
449199	2013 CE_{50}	—	October 9, 2004	Kitt Peak	Spacewatch	·	1.2 km	MPC · JPL
449200	2013 CU_{51}	—	December 31, 2008	Kitt Peak	Spacewatch	V	570 m	MPC · JPL

== 449201–449300 ==
back to top

Designation			Discovery			Properties		Ref
Permanent	Provisional	Named after	Date	Site	Discoverer(s)	Category	Diam.	Ref
449201	2013 CG_{53}	—	December 6, 2008	Mount Lemmon	Mount Lemmon Survey	·	1.1 km	MPC · JPL
449202	2013 CR_{55}	—	May 6, 2010	WISE	WISE	·	3.2 km	MPC · JPL
449203	2013 CX_{55}	—	November 19, 2008	Mount Lemmon	Mount Lemmon Survey	·	1.1 km	MPC · JPL
449204	2013 CS_{56}	—	September 25, 2006	Mount Lemmon	Mount Lemmon Survey	AGN	990 m	MPC · JPL
449205	2013 CT_{57}	—	November 11, 2007	Mount Lemmon	Mount Lemmon Survey	·	3.5 km	MPC · JPL
449206	2013 CQ_{58}	—	September 26, 2006	Kitt Peak	Spacewatch	·	2.3 km	MPC · JPL
449207	2013 CZ_{64}	—	December 22, 2008	Kitt Peak	Spacewatch	V	620 m	MPC · JPL
449208	2013 CD_{69}	—	April 12, 2004	Kitt Peak	Spacewatch	·	1.9 km	MPC · JPL
449209	2013 CW_{69}	—	March 3, 2006	Kitt Peak	Spacewatch	V	590 m	MPC · JPL
449210	2013 CX_{70}	—	February 19, 2009	Catalina	CSS	·	1.4 km	MPC · JPL
449211	2013 CB_{74}	—	January 7, 2002	Kitt Peak	Spacewatch	·	900 m	MPC · JPL
449212	2013 CT_{74}	—	October 20, 2007	Mount Lemmon	Mount Lemmon Survey	·	1.3 km	MPC · JPL
449213	2013 CB_{75}	—	December 5, 2008	Kitt Peak	Spacewatch	·	1.0 km	MPC · JPL
449214	2013 CM_{76}	—	June 15, 2007	Kitt Peak	Spacewatch	V	770 m	MPC · JPL
449215	2013 CO_{81}	—	June 28, 1998	Kitt Peak	Spacewatch	·	1.6 km	MPC · JPL
449216	2013 CB_{83}	—	November 24, 2008	Mount Lemmon	Mount Lemmon Survey	·	1.5 km	MPC · JPL
449217	2013 CZ_{83}	—	February 1, 2009	Mount Lemmon	Mount Lemmon Survey	·	1.0 km	MPC · JPL
449218	2013 CY_{86}	—	November 14, 2007	Kitt Peak	Spacewatch	MIS	2.7 km	MPC · JPL
449219	2013 CQ_{92}	—	October 7, 2004	Kitt Peak	Spacewatch	·	780 m	MPC · JPL
449220	2013 CK_{97}	—	January 8, 2013	Mount Lemmon	Mount Lemmon Survey	MAS	610 m	MPC · JPL
449221	2013 CS_{98}	—	April 12, 2004	Kitt Peak	Spacewatch	·	1.8 km	MPC · JPL
449222	2013 CO_{106}	—	January 31, 2006	Kitt Peak	Spacewatch	V	510 m	MPC · JPL
449223	2013 CN_{107}	—	January 17, 2013	Mount Lemmon	Mount Lemmon Survey	·	1.4 km	MPC · JPL
449224	2013 CR_{107}	—	August 10, 2010	Kitt Peak	Spacewatch	·	2.9 km	MPC · JPL
449225	2013 CE_{109}	—	January 20, 2013	Kitt Peak	Spacewatch	·	3.5 km	MPC · JPL
449226	2013 CT_{109}	—	May 3, 2006	Mount Lemmon	Mount Lemmon Survey	·	1.4 km	MPC · JPL
449227	2013 CF_{117}	—	November 9, 2008	Mount Lemmon	Mount Lemmon Survey	·	1.2 km	MPC · JPL
449228	2013 CJ_{119}	—	April 13, 2002	Kitt Peak	Spacewatch	·	1.0 km	MPC · JPL
449229	2013 CX_{120}	—	December 19, 2004	Mount Lemmon	Mount Lemmon Survey	·	1.2 km	MPC · JPL
449230	2013 CO_{130}	—	November 11, 2004	Kitt Peak	Spacewatch	NYS	1.1 km	MPC · JPL
449231	2013 CR_{130}	—	October 15, 2007	Mount Lemmon	Mount Lemmon Survey	·	1.7 km	MPC · JPL
449232	2013 CN_{134}	—	January 31, 2004	Catalina	CSS	·	3.1 km	MPC · JPL
449233	2013 CJ_{136}	—	June 7, 2010	WISE	WISE	DOR	2.9 km	MPC · JPL
449234	2013 CS_{137}	—	September 11, 2007	Mount Lemmon	Mount Lemmon Survey	V	810 m	MPC · JPL
449235	2013 CR_{142}	—	February 4, 2006	Mount Lemmon	Mount Lemmon Survey	·	1.2 km	MPC · JPL
449236	2013 CR_{160}	—	September 19, 2006	Kitt Peak	Spacewatch	AGN	1.2 km	MPC · JPL
449237	2013 CP_{163}	—	March 14, 2004	Kitt Peak	Spacewatch	·	2.2 km	MPC · JPL
449238	2013 CR_{164}	—	May 21, 2006	Kitt Peak	Spacewatch	NYS	1.1 km	MPC · JPL
449239	2013 CW_{166}	—	February 5, 2013	Kitt Peak	Spacewatch	·	2.0 km	MPC · JPL
449240	2013 CL_{169}	—	September 30, 2006	Mount Lemmon	Mount Lemmon Survey	·	2.1 km	MPC · JPL
449241	2013 CB_{174}	—	August 27, 2006	Kitt Peak	Spacewatch	·	2.9 km	MPC · JPL
449242	2013 CR_{174}	—	February 28, 2008	Kitt Peak	Spacewatch	·	2.0 km	MPC · JPL
449243	2013 CS_{175}	—	April 2, 2006	Kitt Peak	Spacewatch	·	1.3 km	MPC · JPL
449244	2013 CS_{177}	—	May 4, 2006	Mount Lemmon	Mount Lemmon Survey	NYS	1.2 km	MPC · JPL
449245	2013 CQ_{180}	—	December 17, 2003	Kitt Peak	Spacewatch	·	1.5 km	MPC · JPL
449246	2013 CR_{183}	—	March 19, 2009	Mount Lemmon	Mount Lemmon Survey	·	1.2 km	MPC · JPL
449247	2013 CU_{183}	—	March 10, 2005	Mount Lemmon	Mount Lemmon Survey	KON	3.3 km	MPC · JPL
449248	2013 CT_{187}	—	February 2, 2009	Kitt Peak	Spacewatch	·	1.1 km	MPC · JPL
449249	2013 CO_{195}	—	December 22, 2008	Kitt Peak	Spacewatch	·	1.1 km	MPC · JPL
449250	2013 CH_{202}	—	May 27, 2009	Kitt Peak	Spacewatch	DOR	2.2 km	MPC · JPL
449251	2013 CV_{212}	—	February 20, 2009	Mount Lemmon	Mount Lemmon Survey	·	1.6 km	MPC · JPL
449252	2013 DP_{3}	—	October 9, 2004	Kitt Peak	Spacewatch	·	890 m	MPC · JPL
449253	2013 DP_{5}	—	February 19, 2009	Kitt Peak	Spacewatch	V	470 m	MPC · JPL
449254	2013 DE_{12}	—	September 23, 2006	Kitt Peak	Spacewatch	EUN	1.2 km	MPC · JPL
449255	2013 DF_{12}	—	October 10, 1996	Kitt Peak	Spacewatch	·	1.2 km	MPC · JPL
449256	2013 DL_{15}	—	May 23, 2006	Mount Lemmon	Mount Lemmon Survey	V	660 m	MPC · JPL
449257	2013 DP_{15}	—	April 11, 2005	Kitt Peak	Spacewatch	·	1.1 km	MPC · JPL
449258	2013 DR_{16}	—	December 17, 2003	Socorro	LINEAR	EUN	1.7 km	MPC · JPL
449259	2013 EF	—	September 10, 2008	Siding Spring	SSS	PHO	1.1 km	MPC · JPL
449260	2013 EJ_{1}	—	August 29, 2006	Kitt Peak	Spacewatch	·	1.9 km	MPC · JPL
449261	2013 ED_{2}	—	February 12, 2004	Kitt Peak	Spacewatch	·	1.5 km	MPC · JPL
449262	2013 EO_{10}	—	March 25, 2006	Kitt Peak	Spacewatch	V	750 m	MPC · JPL
449263	2013 EC_{12}	—	March 15, 2004	Kitt Peak	Spacewatch	AEO	1.0 km	MPC · JPL
449264	2013 EZ_{13}	—	February 19, 2009	Kitt Peak	Spacewatch	·	1.1 km	MPC · JPL
449265	2013 EF_{15}	—	March 31, 2009	Kitt Peak	Spacewatch	·	1.4 km	MPC · JPL
449266	2013 ER_{17}	—	December 15, 2004	Kitt Peak	Spacewatch	·	1.1 km	MPC · JPL
449267	2013 ED_{18}	—	October 31, 2010	Mount Lemmon	Mount Lemmon Survey	·	1.5 km	MPC · JPL
449268	2013 EL_{24}	—	October 9, 2007	Kitt Peak	Spacewatch	·	1.4 km	MPC · JPL
449269	2013 EV_{24}	—	April 21, 2006	Kitt Peak	Spacewatch	·	1.3 km	MPC · JPL
449270	2013 EC_{26}	—	December 22, 2003	Kitt Peak	Spacewatch	·	1.4 km	MPC · JPL
449271	2013 EP_{30}	—	June 28, 2005	Kitt Peak	Spacewatch	·	1.5 km	MPC · JPL
449272	2013 EL_{31}	—	September 25, 1998	Anderson Mesa	LONEOS	·	2.0 km	MPC · JPL
449273	2013 EA_{33}	—	March 19, 2005	Siding Spring	SSS	·	1.4 km	MPC · JPL
449274	2013 EM_{38}	—	April 1, 2008	Mount Lemmon	Mount Lemmon Survey	·	1.7 km	MPC · JPL
449275	2013 EM_{45}	—	December 20, 2004	Mount Lemmon	Mount Lemmon Survey	·	800 m	MPC · JPL
449276	2013 EJ_{46}	—	September 12, 2007	Mount Lemmon	Mount Lemmon Survey	NYS	990 m	MPC · JPL
449277	2013 ET_{46}	—	February 8, 1995	Kitt Peak	Spacewatch	NYS	910 m	MPC · JPL
449278	2013 EH_{48}	—	February 14, 2009	Mount Lemmon	Mount Lemmon Survey	MAS	480 m	MPC · JPL
449279	2013 ED_{49}	—	October 19, 2006	Kitt Peak	Spacewatch	AGN	950 m	MPC · JPL
449280	2013 EF_{59}	—	March 17, 2004	Kitt Peak	Spacewatch	·	1.4 km	MPC · JPL
449281	2013 EN_{62}	—	November 2, 2007	Kitt Peak	Spacewatch	(5)	1.0 km	MPC · JPL
449282	2013 EQ_{67}	—	November 1, 2010	Kitt Peak	Spacewatch	·	3.2 km	MPC · JPL
449283	2013 EO_{68}	—	April 21, 2004	Kitt Peak	Spacewatch	AGN	1.1 km	MPC · JPL
449284	2013 EH_{72}	—	August 29, 2006	Kitt Peak	Spacewatch	·	1.7 km	MPC · JPL
449285	2013 EM_{80}	—	February 7, 2013	Kitt Peak	Spacewatch	·	1.9 km	MPC · JPL
449286	2013 EW_{80}	—	November 3, 2007	Mount Lemmon	Mount Lemmon Survey	·	1.1 km	MPC · JPL
449287	2013 EE_{83}	—	March 19, 2009	Kitt Peak	Spacewatch	·	1.4 km	MPC · JPL
449288	2013 EO_{85}	—	April 24, 2008	Kitt Peak	Spacewatch	THM	2.1 km	MPC · JPL
449289	2013 ER_{85}	—	March 30, 2008	Kitt Peak	Spacewatch	·	2.7 km	MPC · JPL
449290	2013 EP_{86}	—	December 29, 2003	Catalina	CSS	EUN	1.6 km	MPC · JPL
449291	2013 ER_{90}	—	March 31, 2009	Kitt Peak	Spacewatch	·	1.5 km	MPC · JPL
449292	2013 EU_{92}	—	December 3, 2007	Kitt Peak	Spacewatch	JUN	1.1 km	MPC · JPL
449293	2013 EC_{94}	—	February 14, 2013	Catalina	CSS	·	3.5 km	MPC · JPL
449294	2013 EK_{94}	—	May 2, 2003	Kitt Peak	Spacewatch	·	3.1 km	MPC · JPL
449295	2013 EQ_{98}	—	February 8, 2008	Kitt Peak	Spacewatch	KOR	1.3 km	MPC · JPL
449296	2013 EU_{105}	—	September 16, 2006	Catalina	CSS	·	2.7 km	MPC · JPL
449297	2013 ET_{110}	—	March 31, 2009	Mount Lemmon	Mount Lemmon Survey	·	1.4 km	MPC · JPL
449298	2013 EX_{111}	—	March 13, 2013	Kitt Peak	Spacewatch	·	3.2 km	MPC · JPL
449299	2013 EY_{111}	—	January 10, 2008	Kitt Peak	Spacewatch	·	1.7 km	MPC · JPL
449300	2013 EZ_{111}	—	March 13, 2013	Kitt Peak	Spacewatch	·	2.6 km	MPC · JPL

== 449301–449400 ==
back to top

Designation			Discovery			Properties		Ref
Permanent	Provisional	Named after	Date	Site	Discoverer(s)	Category	Diam.	Ref
449301	2013 EC_{114}	—	November 2, 2011	Kitt Peak	Spacewatch	·	2.4 km	MPC · JPL
449302	2013 EF_{114}	—	October 24, 2005	Kitt Peak	Spacewatch	·	3.6 km	MPC · JPL
449303	2013 EC_{115}	—	April 5, 2000	Socorro	LINEAR	MIS	2.4 km	MPC · JPL
449304	2013 EL_{120}	—	January 12, 2002	Kitt Peak	Spacewatch	KOR	1.2 km	MPC · JPL
449305	2013 EQ_{120}	—	April 29, 2008	Mount Lemmon	Mount Lemmon Survey	·	2.3 km	MPC · JPL
449306	2013 EV_{123}	—	May 13, 2004	Kitt Peak	Spacewatch	·	1.7 km	MPC · JPL
449307	2013 EH_{127}	—	September 25, 2011	Mayhill	L. Elenin	·	1.9 km	MPC · JPL
449308	2013 EL_{147}	—	September 15, 2006	Kitt Peak	Spacewatch	·	1.5 km	MPC · JPL
449309	2013 FZ	—	May 25, 2003	Anderson Mesa	LONEOS	PHO	1.8 km	MPC · JPL
449310	2013 FJ_{2}	—	November 14, 2007	Mount Lemmon	Mount Lemmon Survey	·	1.9 km	MPC · JPL
449311	2013 FK_{5}	—	September 26, 2011	Kitt Peak	Spacewatch	·	1.2 km	MPC · JPL
449312	2013 FT_{5}	—	January 11, 2008	Kitt Peak	Spacewatch	·	2.4 km	MPC · JPL
449313	2013 FA_{6}	—	April 20, 2009	Kitt Peak	Spacewatch	·	1.8 km	MPC · JPL
449314	2013 FQ_{6}	—	January 10, 2007	Mount Lemmon	Mount Lemmon Survey	EOS	1.8 km	MPC · JPL
449315	2013 FY_{6}	—	March 3, 2005	Kitt Peak	Spacewatch	3:2	5.3 km	MPC · JPL
449316	2013 FB_{7}	—	April 13, 2008	Kitt Peak	Spacewatch	·	4.2 km	MPC · JPL
449317	2013 FD_{7}	—	November 23, 2011	Kitt Peak	Spacewatch	·	1.7 km	MPC · JPL
449318	2013 FP_{9}	—	October 9, 2010	Mount Lemmon	Mount Lemmon Survey	·	1.6 km	MPC · JPL
449319	2013 FV_{9}	—	February 1, 2005	Kitt Peak	Spacewatch	·	1.3 km	MPC · JPL
449320	2013 FP_{10}	—	March 12, 2007	Kitt Peak	Spacewatch	·	2.8 km	MPC · JPL
449321	2013 FW_{11}	—	January 15, 2005	Kitt Peak	Spacewatch	·	1.4 km	MPC · JPL
449322	2013 FD_{12}	—	September 16, 2006	Kitt Peak	Spacewatch	·	3.8 km	MPC · JPL
449323	2013 FJ_{12}	—	October 4, 2005	Catalina	CSS	EOS	2.2 km	MPC · JPL
449324	2013 FL_{14}	—	April 18, 2009	Kitt Peak	Spacewatch	WIT	1.3 km	MPC · JPL
449325	2013 FS_{14}	—	October 10, 2010	Mount Lemmon	Mount Lemmon Survey	·	3.4 km	MPC · JPL
449326	2013 FF_{15}	—	January 20, 2009	Mount Lemmon	Mount Lemmon Survey	·	1.4 km	MPC · JPL
449327	2013 FJ_{16}	—	February 23, 2007	Catalina	CSS	·	3.8 km	MPC · JPL
449328	2013 FF_{21}	—	March 10, 2008	Kitt Peak	Spacewatch	·	1.7 km	MPC · JPL
449329	2013 FG_{21}	—	April 18, 2009	Kitt Peak	Spacewatch	·	1.4 km	MPC · JPL
449330	2013 FQ_{21}	—	March 30, 2008	Kitt Peak	Spacewatch	·	1.4 km	MPC · JPL
449331	2013 FE_{22}	—	March 30, 2008	Kitt Peak	Spacewatch	·	2.2 km	MPC · JPL
449332	2013 FJ_{23}	—	March 9, 2005	Mount Lemmon	Mount Lemmon Survey	NYS	1.1 km	MPC · JPL
449333	2013 FU_{24}	—	March 12, 2013	Kitt Peak	Spacewatch	·	2.7 km	MPC · JPL
449334	2013 FW_{24}	—	February 25, 2007	Mount Lemmon	Mount Lemmon Survey	HYG	2.6 km	MPC · JPL
449335	2013 FX_{25}	—	March 5, 2008	Mount Lemmon	Mount Lemmon Survey	·	2.8 km	MPC · JPL
449336	2013 FG_{26}	—	May 6, 2005	Kitt Peak	Spacewatch	·	2.1 km	MPC · JPL
449337	2013 GC_{1}	—	August 8, 2010	WISE	WISE	·	4.8 km	MPC · JPL
449338	2013 GZ_{3}	—	February 26, 2008	Mount Lemmon	Mount Lemmon Survey	KOR	1.3 km	MPC · JPL
449339	2013 GP_{5}	—	September 30, 2010	Mount Lemmon	Mount Lemmon Survey	·	1.7 km	MPC · JPL
449340	2013 GP_{6}	—	April 6, 2008	Kitt Peak	Spacewatch	·	2.0 km	MPC · JPL
449341	2013 GU_{6}	—	July 27, 2010	WISE	WISE	·	3.4 km	MPC · JPL
449342	2013 GM_{10}	—	January 31, 2008	Mount Lemmon	Mount Lemmon Survey	·	1.8 km	MPC · JPL
449343	2013 GR_{12}	—	May 6, 2005	Kitt Peak	Spacewatch	·	1.4 km	MPC · JPL
449344	2013 GJ_{15}	—	January 30, 2009	Mount Lemmon	Mount Lemmon Survey	·	1.6 km	MPC · JPL
449345	2013 GZ_{16}	—	March 11, 2013	Mount Lemmon	Mount Lemmon Survey	·	3.9 km	MPC · JPL
449346	2013 GT_{18}	—	September 26, 2006	Catalina	CSS	·	4.0 km	MPC · JPL
449347	2013 GW_{18}	—	May 5, 2008	Kitt Peak	Spacewatch	·	2.9 km	MPC · JPL
449348	2013 GM_{20}	—	April 11, 2008	Kitt Peak	Spacewatch	EOS	1.9 km	MPC · JPL
449349	2013 GE_{21}	—	June 1, 2008	Mount Lemmon	Mount Lemmon Survey	·	3.7 km	MPC · JPL
449350	2013 GX_{26}	—	March 11, 2008	Mount Lemmon	Mount Lemmon Survey	·	2.1 km	MPC · JPL
449351	2013 GW_{34}	—	September 26, 2011	Kitt Peak	Spacewatch	·	1.2 km	MPC · JPL
449352	2013 GT_{40}	—	March 21, 2004	Kitt Peak	Spacewatch	EUN	1.2 km	MPC · JPL
449353	2013 GW_{41}	—	March 26, 2009	Kitt Peak	Spacewatch	EUN	880 m	MPC · JPL
449354	2013 GH_{42}	—	February 16, 2013	Mount Lemmon	Mount Lemmon Survey	·	1.5 km	MPC · JPL
449355	2013 GX_{45}	—	March 13, 2013	Kitt Peak	Spacewatch	·	3.6 km	MPC · JPL
449356	2013 GL_{52}	—	April 10, 2013	Mount Lemmon	Mount Lemmon Survey	EOS	1.7 km	MPC · JPL
449357	2013 GY_{52}	—	May 28, 2008	Mount Lemmon	Mount Lemmon Survey	·	2.4 km	MPC · JPL
449358	2013 GW_{55}	—	November 27, 2006	Kitt Peak	Spacewatch	KOR	1.6 km	MPC · JPL
449359	2013 GH_{56}	—	February 7, 2008	Kitt Peak	Spacewatch	AGN	1.2 km	MPC · JPL
449360	2013 GL_{57}	—	December 19, 2003	Kitt Peak	Spacewatch	·	2.2 km	MPC · JPL
449361	2013 GK_{58}	—	August 28, 2006	Kitt Peak	Spacewatch	·	1.5 km	MPC · JPL
449362	2013 GX_{72}	—	November 18, 2006	Kitt Peak	Spacewatch	KOR	1.3 km	MPC · JPL
449363	2013 GL_{74}	—	May 16, 2009	Kitt Peak	Spacewatch	·	1.5 km	MPC · JPL
449364	2013 GW_{74}	—	August 19, 2001	Socorro	LINEAR	·	3.3 km	MPC · JPL
449365	2013 GG_{76}	—	April 13, 2008	Mount Lemmon	Mount Lemmon Survey	·	1.5 km	MPC · JPL
449366	2013 GG_{77}	—	December 28, 2003	Socorro	LINEAR	·	1.8 km	MPC · JPL
449367	2013 GU_{85}	—	February 10, 2008	Kitt Peak	Spacewatch	·	1.6 km	MPC · JPL
449368	2013 GF_{86}	—	March 19, 2007	Anderson Mesa	LONEOS	·	4.1 km	MPC · JPL
449369	2013 GY_{87}	—	May 13, 2004	Kitt Peak	Spacewatch	·	2.1 km	MPC · JPL
449370	2013 GM_{90}	—	August 27, 2009	Kitt Peak	Spacewatch	·	2.8 km	MPC · JPL
449371	2013 GR_{90}	—	February 17, 2001	Kitt Peak	Spacewatch	·	3.6 km	MPC · JPL
449372	2013 GA_{93}	—	October 28, 2010	Mount Lemmon	Mount Lemmon Survey	·	3.0 km	MPC · JPL
449373	2013 GN_{93}	—	April 10, 2005	Mount Lemmon	Mount Lemmon Survey	·	1.0 km	MPC · JPL
449374	2013 GQ_{93}	—	March 15, 2013	Kitt Peak	Spacewatch	·	2.4 km	MPC · JPL
449375	2013 GG_{94}	—	October 27, 2005	Kitt Peak	Spacewatch	·	2.6 km	MPC · JPL
449376	2013 GV_{95}	—	March 13, 2007	Mount Lemmon	Mount Lemmon Survey	VER	2.9 km	MPC · JPL
449377	2013 GM_{96}	—	August 27, 2009	Kitt Peak	Spacewatch	LIX	3.3 km	MPC · JPL
449378	2013 GP_{97}	—	April 8, 2013	Mount Lemmon	Mount Lemmon Survey	·	2.2 km	MPC · JPL
449379	2013 GK_{98}	—	March 16, 2013	Kitt Peak	Spacewatch	·	2.2 km	MPC · JPL
449380	2013 GU_{98}	—	October 7, 2004	Kitt Peak	Spacewatch	URS	3.4 km	MPC · JPL
449381	2013 GD_{101}	—	October 5, 2004	Kitt Peak	Spacewatch	·	3.3 km	MPC · JPL
449382	2013 GP_{102}	—	February 10, 2008	Kitt Peak	Spacewatch	·	1.8 km	MPC · JPL
449383	2013 GA_{103}	—	January 18, 2008	Mount Lemmon	Mount Lemmon Survey	·	2.3 km	MPC · JPL
449384	2013 GJ_{105}	—	October 10, 2005	Kitt Peak	Spacewatch	EOS	2.6 km	MPC · JPL
449385	2013 GQ_{105}	—	February 28, 2008	Kitt Peak	Spacewatch	·	2.0 km	MPC · JPL
449386	2013 GE_{106}	—	September 21, 2001	Kitt Peak	Spacewatch	AST	1.9 km	MPC · JPL
449387	2013 GG_{106}	—	March 26, 2009	Kitt Peak	Spacewatch	·	900 m	MPC · JPL
449388	2013 GT_{106}	—	October 6, 2004	Kitt Peak	Spacewatch	·	2.9 km	MPC · JPL
449389	2013 GL_{107}	—	October 29, 1999	Kitt Peak	Spacewatch	·	3.1 km	MPC · JPL
449390	2013 GV_{108}	—	October 5, 2004	Kitt Peak	Spacewatch	EOS	2.2 km	MPC · JPL
449391	2013 GW_{109}	—	March 12, 2005	Mount Lemmon	Mount Lemmon Survey	·	1.1 km	MPC · JPL
449392	2013 GO_{110}	—	November 5, 1999	Kitt Peak	Spacewatch	·	3.2 km	MPC · JPL
449393	2013 GF_{112}	—	March 12, 2007	Catalina	CSS	·	4.3 km	MPC · JPL
449394	2013 GZ_{114}	—	November 16, 2011	Kitt Peak	Spacewatch	EUN	2.0 km	MPC · JPL
449395	2013 GT_{116}	—	February 7, 2002	Kitt Peak	Spacewatch	·	2.3 km	MPC · JPL
449396	2013 GP_{123}	—	September 19, 2006	Kitt Peak	Spacewatch	·	1.6 km	MPC · JPL
449397	2013 GB_{124}	—	July 12, 2010	WISE	WISE	HOF	2.3 km	MPC · JPL
449398	2013 GH_{125}	—	November 18, 2011	Mount Lemmon	Mount Lemmon Survey	·	1.5 km	MPC · JPL
449399	2013 GS_{127}	—	January 6, 2006	Kitt Peak	Spacewatch	·	2.7 km	MPC · JPL
449400	2013 GL_{131}	—	November 11, 2010	Mount Lemmon	Mount Lemmon Survey	·	3.7 km	MPC · JPL

== 449401–449500 ==
back to top

Designation			Discovery			Properties		Ref
Permanent	Provisional	Named after	Date	Site	Discoverer(s)	Category	Diam.	Ref
449401	2013 GW_{132}	—	August 5, 2010	WISE	WISE	·	2.5 km	MPC · JPL
449402	2013 GH_{134}	—	September 25, 2006	Kitt Peak	Spacewatch	·	1.6 km	MPC · JPL
449403	2013 GF_{135}	—	November 6, 2010	Mount Lemmon	Mount Lemmon Survey	EOS	1.7 km	MPC · JPL
449404	2013 HL_{1}	—	September 30, 2011	Mount Lemmon	Mount Lemmon Survey	EUN	1.2 km	MPC · JPL
449405	2013 HL_{3}	—	September 10, 2004	Kitt Peak	Spacewatch	EOS	2.1 km	MPC · JPL
449406	2013 HP_{8}	—	May 28, 2000	Socorro	LINEAR	·	2.4 km	MPC · JPL
449407	2013 HQ_{8}	—	April 17, 2009	Mount Lemmon	Mount Lemmon Survey	EUN	1.1 km	MPC · JPL
449408	2013 HS_{8}	—	January 3, 2012	Mount Lemmon	Mount Lemmon Survey	·	3.6 km	MPC · JPL
449409	2013 HP_{16}	—	September 10, 2007	Mount Lemmon	Mount Lemmon Survey	·	1.2 km	MPC · JPL
449410	2013 HV_{17}	—	September 20, 2011	Kitt Peak	Spacewatch	·	1.6 km	MPC · JPL
449411	2013 HL_{21}	—	April 13, 2004	Kitt Peak	Spacewatch	·	1.5 km	MPC · JPL
449412	2013 HH_{25}	—	March 5, 2013	Mount Lemmon	Mount Lemmon Survey	·	1.9 km	MPC · JPL
449413	2013 HZ_{25}	—	December 29, 2011	Mount Lemmon	Mount Lemmon Survey	·	2.6 km	MPC · JPL
449414	2013 HV_{28}	—	December 2, 2010	Mount Lemmon	Mount Lemmon Survey	EOS	2.3 km	MPC · JPL
449415	2013 HE_{32}	—	August 12, 2010	Kitt Peak	Spacewatch	·	2.0 km	MPC · JPL
449416	2013 HP_{32}	—	January 12, 2000	Kitt Peak	Spacewatch	·	1.1 km	MPC · JPL
449417	2013 HG_{35}	—	July 27, 2009	Kitt Peak	Spacewatch	EOS	1.9 km	MPC · JPL
449418	2013 HM_{41}	—	February 21, 2007	Mount Lemmon	Mount Lemmon Survey	·	2.0 km	MPC · JPL
449419	2013 HZ_{43}	—	December 5, 2010	Mount Lemmon	Mount Lemmon Survey	·	1.9 km	MPC · JPL
449420	2013 HF_{45}	—	July 22, 2010	WISE	WISE	·	4.2 km	MPC · JPL
449421	2013 HZ_{48}	—	September 14, 2009	Catalina	CSS	·	3.1 km	MPC · JPL
449422	2013 HK_{53}	—	February 29, 2004	Kitt Peak	Spacewatch	·	1.7 km	MPC · JPL
449423	2013 HA_{59}	—	October 25, 2005	Kitt Peak	Spacewatch	·	1.5 km	MPC · JPL
449424	2013 HB_{63}	—	October 3, 1999	Kitt Peak	Spacewatch	EOS	2.0 km	MPC · JPL
449425	2013 HG_{68}	—	May 14, 2008	Mount Lemmon	Mount Lemmon Survey	(21885)	2.8 km	MPC · JPL
449426	2013 HM_{74}	—	March 8, 2008	Kitt Peak	Spacewatch	·	1.9 km	MPC · JPL
449427	2013 HW_{74}	—	September 17, 2009	Mount Lemmon	Mount Lemmon Survey	VER	2.2 km	MPC · JPL
449428	2013 HP_{83}	—	January 19, 2012	Kitt Peak	Spacewatch	·	2.4 km	MPC · JPL
449429	2013 HZ_{96}	—	September 13, 2005	Kitt Peak	Spacewatch	KOR	1.0 km	MPC · JPL
449430	2013 HJ_{100}	—	October 4, 2004	Kitt Peak	Spacewatch	THM	2.2 km	MPC · JPL
449431	2013 HV_{103}	—	October 28, 2010	Mount Lemmon	Mount Lemmon Survey	·	2.6 km	MPC · JPL
449432	2013 HP_{108}	—	February 9, 2007	Kitt Peak	Spacewatch	·	1.9 km	MPC · JPL
449433	2013 HL_{109}	—	March 12, 2007	Kitt Peak	Spacewatch	·	2.4 km	MPC · JPL
449434	2013 HX_{109}	—	October 17, 2010	Mount Lemmon	Mount Lemmon Survey	·	1.4 km	MPC · JPL
449435	2013 HB_{116}	—	October 2, 2005	Mount Lemmon	Mount Lemmon Survey	KOR	940 m	MPC · JPL
449436	2013 HN_{118}	—	November 3, 2010	Mount Lemmon	Mount Lemmon Survey	·	2.0 km	MPC · JPL
449437	2013 HS_{122}	—	December 24, 2005	Kitt Peak	Spacewatch	·	1.9 km	MPC · JPL
449438	2013 HZ_{122}	—	October 31, 2010	Mount Lemmon	Mount Lemmon Survey	·	1.8 km	MPC · JPL
449439	2013 HL_{134}	—	August 18, 2006	Kitt Peak	Spacewatch	·	1.6 km	MPC · JPL
449440	2013 HE_{139}	—	November 14, 2006	Kitt Peak	Spacewatch	·	1.5 km	MPC · JPL
449441	2013 HK_{140}	—	September 29, 2005	Mount Lemmon	Mount Lemmon Survey	·	1.5 km	MPC · JPL
449442	2013 HU_{145}	—	December 6, 2002	Socorro	LINEAR	·	1.4 km	MPC · JPL
449443	2013 HG_{146}	—	January 13, 2008	Mount Lemmon	Mount Lemmon Survey	·	1.2 km	MPC · JPL
449444	2013 JH	—	October 2, 2010	Mount Lemmon	Mount Lemmon Survey	·	4.9 km	MPC · JPL
449445	2013 JM	—	January 10, 2008	Kitt Peak	Spacewatch	·	1.9 km	MPC · JPL
449446	2013 JH_{21}	—	February 21, 2007	Mount Lemmon	Mount Lemmon Survey	EOS	1.7 km	MPC · JPL
449447	2013 JM_{21}	—	January 8, 2010	WISE	WISE	·	3.5 km	MPC · JPL
449448	2013 JX_{22}	—	October 7, 2004	Kitt Peak	Spacewatch	·	3.8 km	MPC · JPL
449449	2013 JY_{30}	—	May 11, 2013	Mount Lemmon	Mount Lemmon Survey	VER	2.6 km	MPC · JPL
449450	2013 JA_{32}	—	April 25, 2007	Mount Lemmon	Mount Lemmon Survey	·	3.4 km	MPC · JPL
449451	2013 JW_{33}	—	December 8, 2010	Kitt Peak	Spacewatch	·	3.7 km	MPC · JPL
449452	2013 JA_{37}	—	October 24, 2005	Kitt Peak	Spacewatch	·	2.1 km	MPC · JPL
449453	2013 JJ_{40}	—	January 31, 2006	Kitt Peak	Spacewatch	VER	3.0 km	MPC · JPL
449454	2013 JM_{42}	—	May 15, 2009	Mount Lemmon	Mount Lemmon Survey	·	4.4 km	MPC · JPL
449455	2013 JS_{49}	—	November 11, 2010	Mount Lemmon	Mount Lemmon Survey	·	2.1 km	MPC · JPL
449456	2013 JE_{54}	—	March 18, 2013	Mount Lemmon	Mount Lemmon Survey	·	3.7 km	MPC · JPL
449457	2013 KU_{8}	—	November 9, 1999	Kitt Peak	Spacewatch	·	3.0 km	MPC · JPL
449458	2013 KC_{17}	—	May 31, 2013	Kitt Peak	Spacewatch	·	2.5 km	MPC · JPL
449459	2013 LB_{3}	—	November 10, 2004	Kitt Peak	Spacewatch	·	4.0 km	MPC · JPL
449460	2013 LJ_{4}	—	May 14, 2008	Mount Lemmon	Mount Lemmon Survey	·	2.4 km	MPC · JPL
449461	2013 LX_{7}	—	September 15, 2009	Kitt Peak	Spacewatch	EOS	1.9 km	MPC · JPL
449462	2013 LE_{8}	—	November 13, 2010	Mount Lemmon	Mount Lemmon Survey	·	3.0 km	MPC · JPL
449463	2013 LR_{11}	—	February 9, 2010	WISE	WISE	CYB	5.0 km	MPC · JPL
449464	2013 LH_{24}	—	November 4, 2004	Kitt Peak	Spacewatch	·	3.2 km	MPC · JPL
449465	2013 LT_{33}	—	November 24, 2003	Kitt Peak	Spacewatch	·	980 m	MPC · JPL
449466	2013 ME_{2}	—	February 17, 2007	Kitt Peak	Spacewatch	EOS	1.8 km	MPC · JPL
449467	2014 BZ_{28}	—	January 14, 2011	Mount Lemmon	Mount Lemmon Survey	·	1.3 km	MPC · JPL
449468	2014 BN_{60}	—	September 7, 1999	Socorro	LINEAR	H	580 m	MPC · JPL
449469	2014 CL_{14}	—	March 23, 2004	Socorro	LINEAR	H	390 m	MPC · JPL
449470	2014 CP_{21}	—	April 3, 2010	WISE	WISE	·	3.4 km	MPC · JPL
449471	2014 DR_{25}	—	April 11, 2005	Kitt Peak	Spacewatch	·	950 m	MPC · JPL
449472	2014 DK_{36}	—	September 22, 2008	Kitt Peak	Spacewatch	MAS	740 m	MPC · JPL
449473	2014 DY_{50}	—	November 1, 2005	Kitt Peak	Spacewatch	·	780 m	MPC · JPL
449474	2014 DX_{74}	—	October 7, 2004	Kitt Peak	Spacewatch	H	560 m	MPC · JPL
449475	2014 DZ_{79}	—	October 29, 2005	Kitt Peak	Spacewatch	V	630 m	MPC · JPL
449476	2014 DN_{87}	—	May 3, 2003	Kitt Peak	Spacewatch	MAS	740 m	MPC · JPL
449477	2014 DN_{90}	—	February 21, 2007	Kitt Peak	Spacewatch	·	680 m	MPC · JPL
449478	2014 DW_{96}	—	May 15, 2004	Socorro	LINEAR	·	700 m	MPC · JPL
449479	2014 DV_{119}	—	May 3, 2003	Kitt Peak	Spacewatch	NYS	940 m	MPC · JPL
449480	2014 DG_{140}	—	January 12, 2010	Catalina	CSS	V	680 m	MPC · JPL
449481	2014 EZ_{3}	—	September 12, 2007	Mount Lemmon	Mount Lemmon Survey	H	520 m	MPC · JPL
449482	2014 EQ_{43}	—	August 19, 2006	Anderson Mesa	LONEOS	(1547)	1.8 km	MPC · JPL
449483	2014 EW_{48}	—	April 27, 2000	Socorro	LINEAR	H	570 m	MPC · JPL
449484	2014 FP_{2}	—	March 12, 2007	Kitt Peak	Spacewatch	·	820 m	MPC · JPL
449485	2014 FX_{3}	—	March 24, 2006	Mount Lemmon	Mount Lemmon Survey	EUN	1.1 km	MPC · JPL
449486	2014 FG_{7}	—	June 26, 2004	Catalina	CSS	·	1.1 km	MPC · JPL
449487	2014 FP_{11}	—	March 16, 2007	Kitt Peak	Spacewatch	·	1.3 km	MPC · JPL
449488	2014 FB_{33}	—	April 17, 2009	Catalina	CSS	H	430 m	MPC · JPL
449489	2014 FP_{46}	—	March 13, 2010	Mount Lemmon	Mount Lemmon Survey	EUN	1.4 km	MPC · JPL
449490	2014 FD_{47}	—	April 2, 2005	Mount Lemmon	Mount Lemmon Survey	·	2.2 km	MPC · JPL
449491	2014 FL_{47}	—	February 28, 2006	Mount Lemmon	Mount Lemmon Survey	·	1.7 km	MPC · JPL
449492	2014 FN_{51}	—	September 20, 2011	Kitt Peak	Spacewatch	·	1.9 km	MPC · JPL
449493	2014 FT_{52}	—	November 8, 2007	Socorro	LINEAR	H	510 m	MPC · JPL
449494	2014 FZ_{53}	—	May 19, 2010	Catalina	CSS	·	1.2 km	MPC · JPL
449495	2014 FK_{55}	—	May 11, 2002	Socorro	LINEAR	·	1.5 km	MPC · JPL
449496	2014 FS_{57}	—	February 11, 2008	Kitt Peak	Spacewatch	TIR	3.4 km	MPC · JPL
449497	2014 FT_{65}	—	December 19, 2004	Mount Lemmon	Mount Lemmon Survey	·	1.6 km	MPC · JPL
449498	2014 FF_{66}	—	March 10, 2007	Mount Lemmon	Mount Lemmon Survey	·	700 m	MPC · JPL
449499	2014 GJ_{3}	—	March 31, 2009	Mount Lemmon	Mount Lemmon Survey	·	1.9 km	MPC · JPL
449500	2014 GD_{14}	—	January 22, 2006	Mount Lemmon	Mount Lemmon Survey	MAS	740 m	MPC · JPL

== 449501–449600 ==
back to top

Designation			Discovery			Properties		Ref
Permanent	Provisional	Named after	Date	Site	Discoverer(s)	Category	Diam.	Ref
449501	2014 GO_{15}	—	October 18, 2007	Kitt Peak	Spacewatch	·	2.2 km	MPC · JPL
449502	2014 GZ_{15}	—	March 15, 2010	Mount Lemmon	Mount Lemmon Survey	·	1.2 km	MPC · JPL
449503	2014 GW_{17}	—	May 22, 2011	Mount Lemmon	Mount Lemmon Survey	·	650 m	MPC · JPL
449504	2014 GQ_{26}	—	October 26, 2008	Kitt Peak	Spacewatch	·	1.4 km	MPC · JPL
449505	2014 GP_{30}	—	March 24, 2003	Kitt Peak	Spacewatch	MAS	630 m	MPC · JPL
449506	2014 GC_{31}	—	June 16, 2005	Mount Lemmon	Mount Lemmon Survey	·	950 m	MPC · JPL
449507	2014 GW_{33}	—	March 18, 2010	Mount Lemmon	Mount Lemmon Survey	·	1.2 km	MPC · JPL
449508	2014 GY_{36}	—	January 31, 2009	Kitt Peak	Spacewatch	AEO	960 m	MPC · JPL
449509	2014 GV_{38}	—	October 21, 2003	Kitt Peak	Spacewatch	·	1.8 km	MPC · JPL
449510	2014 GW_{39}	—	September 7, 2004	Kitt Peak	Spacewatch	MAS	580 m	MPC · JPL
449511	2014 GA_{40}	—	December 5, 2012	Mount Lemmon	Mount Lemmon Survey	·	1.1 km	MPC · JPL
449512	2014 GL_{44}	—	March 12, 2007	Catalina	CSS	(2076)	850 m	MPC · JPL
449513	2014 GM_{45}	—	October 24, 2011	Mount Lemmon	Mount Lemmon Survey	·	1.4 km	MPC · JPL
449514	2014 GS_{48}	—	February 8, 2008	Mount Lemmon	Mount Lemmon Survey	·	2.1 km	MPC · JPL
449515	2014 GE_{49}	—	March 19, 2001	Socorro	LINEAR	·	2.1 km	MPC · JPL
449516	2014 HF	—	October 20, 2012	Mount Lemmon	Mount Lemmon Survey	·	600 m	MPC · JPL
449517	2014 HT_{2}	—	September 20, 2007	Catalina	CSS	H	490 m	MPC · JPL
449518	2014 HB_{5}	—	June 2, 2003	Kitt Peak	Spacewatch	H	720 m	MPC · JPL
449519	2014 HU_{9}	—	September 30, 2006	Mount Lemmon	Mount Lemmon Survey	·	1.7 km	MPC · JPL
449520	2014 HA_{10}	—	February 15, 2010	Kitt Peak	Spacewatch	·	1.0 km	MPC · JPL
449521	2014 HL_{11}	—	May 5, 2003	Kitt Peak	Spacewatch	·	1.3 km	MPC · JPL
449522	2014 HP_{13}	—	October 10, 2007	Kitt Peak	Spacewatch	·	1.5 km	MPC · JPL
449523	2014 HX_{14}	—	October 15, 2004	Mount Lemmon	Mount Lemmon Survey	·	1.2 km	MPC · JPL
449524	2014 HT_{18}	—	April 10, 2010	Mount Lemmon	Mount Lemmon Survey	·	1.3 km	MPC · JPL
449525	2014 HX_{20}	—	February 21, 2007	Mount Lemmon	Mount Lemmon Survey	·	680 m	MPC · JPL
449526	2014 HL_{21}	—	March 23, 2014	Kitt Peak	Spacewatch	·	1.5 km	MPC · JPL
449527	2014 HK_{26}	—	April 6, 2014	Mount Lemmon	Mount Lemmon Survey	·	3.1 km	MPC · JPL
449528	2014 HW_{32}	—	January 2, 2014	Mount Lemmon	Mount Lemmon Survey	·	1.9 km	MPC · JPL
449529	2014 HD_{36}	—	April 30, 2006	Kitt Peak	Spacewatch	·	1.1 km	MPC · JPL
449530	2014 HL_{38}	—	November 18, 2011	Mount Lemmon	Mount Lemmon Survey	·	1.9 km	MPC · JPL
449531	2014 HN_{39}	—	November 18, 2011	Mount Lemmon	Mount Lemmon Survey	·	1.5 km	MPC · JPL
449532	2014 HW_{40}	—	November 30, 2005	Kitt Peak	Spacewatch	·	770 m	MPC · JPL
449533	2014 HK_{42}	—	January 27, 2006	Kitt Peak	Spacewatch	·	1.1 km	MPC · JPL
449534	2014 HY_{42}	—	February 21, 2009	Kitt Peak	Spacewatch	·	2.0 km	MPC · JPL
449535	2014 HN_{56}	—	September 23, 2008	Kitt Peak	Spacewatch	V	540 m	MPC · JPL
449536	2014 HQ_{72}	—	February 1, 2013	Mount Lemmon	Mount Lemmon Survey	·	1.1 km	MPC · JPL
449537	2014 HR_{91}	—	October 22, 2011	Mount Lemmon	Mount Lemmon Survey	·	2.2 km	MPC · JPL
449538	2014 HL_{100}	—	October 18, 2011	Kitt Peak	Spacewatch	·	1.4 km	MPC · JPL
449539	2014 HW_{109}	—	August 24, 2007	Kitt Peak	Spacewatch	·	1.2 km	MPC · JPL
449540	2014 HK_{114}	—	April 4, 2003	Kitt Peak	Spacewatch	·	2.0 km	MPC · JPL
449541	2014 HE_{123}	—	March 8, 2005	Mount Lemmon	Mount Lemmon Survey	·	1.5 km	MPC · JPL
449542	2014 HT_{124}	—	May 23, 1996	Campo Imperatore	CINEOS	·	1.1 km	MPC · JPL
449543	2014 HN_{128}	—	September 24, 2008	Mount Lemmon	Mount Lemmon Survey	·	640 m	MPC · JPL
449544	2014 HE_{146}	—	July 29, 2010	WISE	WISE	·	4.0 km	MPC · JPL
449545	2014 HZ_{146}	—	May 5, 2006	Kitt Peak	Spacewatch	·	1.2 km	MPC · JPL
449546	2014 HN_{148}	—	May 21, 2004	Kitt Peak	Spacewatch	·	740 m	MPC · JPL
449547	2014 HY_{158}	—	November 13, 2012	Kitt Peak	Spacewatch	·	930 m	MPC · JPL
449548	2014 HU_{160}	—	February 16, 2013	Mount Lemmon	Mount Lemmon Survey	·	1.9 km	MPC · JPL
449549	2014 HD_{163}	—	September 27, 2006	Catalina	CSS	·	1.8 km	MPC · JPL
449550	2014 HG_{164}	—	March 26, 2003	Kitt Peak	Spacewatch	·	1.1 km	MPC · JPL
449551	2014 HF_{167}	—	January 23, 2006	Mount Lemmon	Mount Lemmon Survey	V	680 m	MPC · JPL
449552	2014 HT_{171}	—	February 7, 2007	Mount Lemmon	Mount Lemmon Survey	·	680 m	MPC · JPL
449553	2014 HN_{172}	—	September 13, 2007	Mount Lemmon	Mount Lemmon Survey	EUN	1.4 km	MPC · JPL
449554	2014 HO_{175}	—	October 26, 2005	Kitt Peak	Spacewatch	·	2.7 km	MPC · JPL
449555	2014 HE_{180}	—	September 24, 2008	Mount Lemmon	Mount Lemmon Survey	·	1.1 km	MPC · JPL
449556	2014 HB_{183}	—	March 12, 2010	Catalina	CSS	·	2.0 km	MPC · JPL
449557	2014 HX_{183}	—	June 21, 2010	Kitt Peak	Spacewatch	EUN	980 m	MPC · JPL
449558	2014 HY_{186}	—	October 12, 2007	Mount Lemmon	Mount Lemmon Survey	·	1.3 km	MPC · JPL
449559	2014 HZ_{186}	—	March 16, 2007	Mount Lemmon	Mount Lemmon Survey	V	650 m	MPC · JPL
449560	2014 HN_{188}	—	June 21, 2007	Mount Lemmon	Mount Lemmon Survey	·	900 m	MPC · JPL
449561	2014 JJ	—	January 10, 2007	Kitt Peak	Spacewatch	·	640 m	MPC · JPL
449562	2014 JK	—	September 23, 2011	Mount Lemmon	Mount Lemmon Survey	·	930 m	MPC · JPL
449563	2014 JM	—	October 25, 2005	Mount Lemmon	Mount Lemmon Survey	·	2.8 km	MPC · JPL
449564	2014 JX	—	November 2, 2011	Mount Lemmon	Mount Lemmon Survey	·	2.2 km	MPC · JPL
449565	2014 JR_{1}	—	September 28, 2003	Kitt Peak	Spacewatch	·	970 m	MPC · JPL
449566	2014 JC_{2}	—	March 16, 2007	Mount Lemmon	Mount Lemmon Survey	·	1.6 km	MPC · JPL
449567	2014 JD_{4}	—	October 9, 2008	Mount Lemmon	Mount Lemmon Survey	V	500 m	MPC · JPL
449568	2014 JL_{6}	—	August 29, 2006	Kitt Peak	Spacewatch	·	1.5 km	MPC · JPL
449569	2014 JG_{9}	—	April 15, 2005	Kitt Peak	Spacewatch	·	1.5 km	MPC · JPL
449570	2014 JS_{9}	—	March 3, 2006	Kitt Peak	Spacewatch	·	1.3 km	MPC · JPL
449571	2014 JT_{10}	—	April 15, 2008	Mount Lemmon	Mount Lemmon Survey	·	3.0 km	MPC · JPL
449572	2014 JK_{11}	—	May 10, 2007	Mount Lemmon	Mount Lemmon Survey	V	590 m	MPC · JPL
449573	2014 JZ_{15}	—	March 13, 2007	Mount Lemmon	Mount Lemmon Survey	·	700 m	MPC · JPL
449574	2014 JS_{17}	—	February 22, 2014	Mount Lemmon	Mount Lemmon Survey	·	1.2 km	MPC · JPL
449575	2014 JM_{18}	—	January 26, 2006	Mount Lemmon	Mount Lemmon Survey	NYS	1.2 km	MPC · JPL
449576	2014 JJ_{21}	—	October 11, 2007	Mount Lemmon	Mount Lemmon Survey	·	1.3 km	MPC · JPL
449577	2014 JA_{22}	—	November 1, 2011	Mount Lemmon	Mount Lemmon Survey	·	1.8 km	MPC · JPL
449578	2014 JV_{22}	—	March 3, 2009	Kitt Peak	Spacewatch	EUN	1.1 km	MPC · JPL
449579	2014 JD_{24}	—	March 11, 2008	Kitt Peak	Spacewatch	·	2.6 km	MPC · JPL
449580	2014 JP_{27}	—	February 1, 2013	Mount Lemmon	Mount Lemmon Survey	·	3.5 km	MPC · JPL
449581	2014 JB_{29}	—	April 7, 2008	Mount Lemmon	Mount Lemmon Survey	·	3.6 km	MPC · JPL
449582	2014 JO_{31}	—	May 19, 2004	Kitt Peak	Spacewatch	·	850 m	MPC · JPL
449583	2014 JQ_{31}	—	March 16, 2004	Kitt Peak	Spacewatch	·	750 m	MPC · JPL
449584	2014 JP_{33}	—	September 4, 2008	Kitt Peak	Spacewatch	V	610 m	MPC · JPL
449585	2014 JF_{34}	—	October 19, 2011	Mount Lemmon	Mount Lemmon Survey	·	1.4 km	MPC · JPL
449586	2014 JV_{35}	—	November 20, 2001	Socorro	LINEAR	·	1.8 km	MPC · JPL
449587	2014 JR_{37}	—	January 22, 2006	Mount Lemmon	Mount Lemmon Survey	·	800 m	MPC · JPL
449588	2014 JD_{39}	—	September 3, 2008	Kitt Peak	Spacewatch	·	720 m	MPC · JPL
449589	2014 JA_{41}	—	April 11, 2003	Kitt Peak	Spacewatch	V	680 m	MPC · JPL
449590	2014 JJ_{42}	—	May 11, 2010	Mount Lemmon	Mount Lemmon Survey	·	1.1 km	MPC · JPL
449591	2014 JU_{42}	—	October 11, 2007	Kitt Peak	Spacewatch	KON	2.7 km	MPC · JPL
449592	2014 JZ_{42}	—	November 10, 2010	Mount Lemmon	Mount Lemmon Survey	T_{j} (2.97)	3.8 km	MPC · JPL
449593	2014 JX_{43}	—	February 14, 2013	Catalina	CSS	EOS	2.1 km	MPC · JPL
449594	2014 JK_{44}	—	September 29, 2008	Kitt Peak	Spacewatch	·	790 m	MPC · JPL
449595	2014 JB_{45}	—	November 17, 2009	Kitt Peak	Spacewatch	·	970 m	MPC · JPL
449596	2014 JP_{45}	—	March 26, 2006	Mount Lemmon	Mount Lemmon Survey	·	1.2 km	MPC · JPL
449597	2014 JK_{46}	—	May 23, 2003	Kitt Peak	Spacewatch	·	4.5 km	MPC · JPL
449598	2014 JN_{46}	—	May 10, 2007	Mount Lemmon	Mount Lemmon Survey	·	780 m	MPC · JPL
449599	2014 JH_{47}	—	October 19, 2007	Kitt Peak	Spacewatch	(5)	920 m	MPC · JPL
449600	2014 JG_{48}	—	January 1, 2008	Kitt Peak	Spacewatch	WIT	1.0 km	MPC · JPL

== 449601–449700 ==
back to top

Designation			Discovery			Properties		Ref
Permanent	Provisional	Named after	Date	Site	Discoverer(s)	Category	Diam.	Ref
449601	2014 JM_{48}	—	October 10, 2007	Mount Lemmon	Mount Lemmon Survey	·	1.3 km	MPC · JPL
449602	2014 JV_{51}	—	October 6, 2008	Kitt Peak	Spacewatch	V	650 m	MPC · JPL
449603	2014 JC_{59}	—	April 24, 2004	Kitt Peak	Spacewatch	·	740 m	MPC · JPL
449604	2014 JK_{62}	—	January 29, 2009	Kitt Peak	Spacewatch	·	1.3 km	MPC · JPL
449605	2014 JN_{62}	—	September 12, 1998	Kitt Peak	Spacewatch	·	2.8 km	MPC · JPL
449606	2014 JX_{63}	—	April 5, 2010	Kitt Peak	Spacewatch	·	1.3 km	MPC · JPL
449607	2014 JA_{69}	—	January 29, 2009	Kitt Peak	Spacewatch	·	1.3 km	MPC · JPL
449608	2014 JK_{70}	—	January 5, 2006	Kitt Peak	Spacewatch	·	1.0 km	MPC · JPL
449609	2014 JL_{70}	—	April 7, 2010	Kitt Peak	Spacewatch	·	880 m	MPC · JPL
449610	2014 JU_{70}	—	April 5, 2003	Kitt Peak	Spacewatch	·	820 m	MPC · JPL
449611	2014 JV_{70}	—	November 19, 2008	Mount Lemmon	Mount Lemmon Survey	NYS	940 m	MPC · JPL
449612	2014 JE_{71}	—	November 21, 2008	Mount Lemmon	Mount Lemmon Survey	·	1.6 km	MPC · JPL
449613	2014 JA_{73}	—	October 9, 2005	Kitt Peak	Spacewatch	EOS	2.0 km	MPC · JPL
449614	2014 JB_{73}	—	April 24, 2001	Kitt Peak	Spacewatch	·	700 m	MPC · JPL
449615	2014 JO_{73}	—	March 13, 2010	Kitt Peak	Spacewatch	V	590 m	MPC · JPL
449616	2014 JP_{75}	—	September 23, 2011	Mount Lemmon	Mount Lemmon Survey	EUN	990 m	MPC · JPL
449617	2014 JJ_{76}	—	September 28, 2006	Kitt Peak	Spacewatch	·	1.5 km	MPC · JPL
449618	2014 JT_{78}	—	October 22, 2011	Mount Lemmon	Mount Lemmon Survey	·	1.2 km	MPC · JPL
449619	2014 JC_{79}	—	December 8, 2012	Kitt Peak	Spacewatch	·	1.4 km	MPC · JPL
449620	2014 JJ_{79}	—	March 31, 2008	Mount Lemmon	Mount Lemmon Survey	LIX	3.7 km	MPC · JPL
449621	2014 JN_{79}	—	January 6, 2013	Mount Lemmon	Mount Lemmon Survey	·	3.1 km	MPC · JPL
449622	2014 KQ	—	March 3, 2009	Catalina	CSS	DOR	2.2 km	MPC · JPL
449623	2014 KS	—	October 2, 2006	Mount Lemmon	Mount Lemmon Survey	·	2.1 km	MPC · JPL
449624	2014 KC_{3}	—	March 2, 2010	WISE	WISE	ADE	2.0 km	MPC · JPL
449625	2014 KP_{3}	—	July 14, 2010	WISE	WISE	·	2.8 km	MPC · JPL
449626	2014 KN_{5}	—	May 25, 2007	Mount Lemmon	Mount Lemmon Survey	·	880 m	MPC · JPL
449627	2014 KQ_{6}	—	February 24, 2009	Kitt Peak	Spacewatch	AGN · fast	1.7 km	MPC · JPL
449628	2014 KN_{12}	—	October 21, 2011	Mount Lemmon	Mount Lemmon Survey	(5)	1.2 km	MPC · JPL
449629	2014 KU_{16}	—	May 19, 2010	Mount Lemmon	Mount Lemmon Survey	·	980 m	MPC · JPL
449630	2014 KC_{17}	—	July 20, 2010	WISE	WISE	EMA	3.9 km	MPC · JPL
449631	2014 KL_{17}	—	April 30, 2008	Mount Lemmon	Mount Lemmon Survey	·	4.4 km	MPC · JPL
449632	2014 KR_{17}	—	May 19, 2010	Mount Lemmon	Mount Lemmon Survey	(5)	1.0 km	MPC · JPL
449633	2014 KE_{18}	—	May 10, 2005	Kitt Peak	Spacewatch	EUN	1 km	MPC · JPL
449634	2014 KS_{20}	—	September 18, 2006	Kitt Peak	Spacewatch	·	1.9 km	MPC · JPL
449635	2014 KW_{20}	—	May 22, 2014	Mount Lemmon	Mount Lemmon Survey	·	1.8 km	MPC · JPL
449636	2014 KZ_{23}	—	June 13, 1993	Kitt Peak	Spacewatch	EUN	1.1 km	MPC · JPL
449637	2014 KY_{24}	—	November 10, 2004	Kitt Peak	Spacewatch	·	1.6 km	MPC · JPL
449638	2014 KW_{26}	—	July 15, 2007	Siding Spring	SSS	PHO	1.3 km	MPC · JPL
449639	2014 KJ_{27}	—	June 9, 2010	WISE	WISE	·	3.3 km	MPC · JPL
449640	2014 KM_{27}	—	October 6, 2004	Kitt Peak	Spacewatch	·	2.8 km	MPC · JPL
449641	2014 KY_{28}	—	September 9, 2004	Socorro	LINEAR	·	990 m	MPC · JPL
449642	2014 KE_{29}	—	November 13, 2010	Mount Lemmon	Mount Lemmon Survey	·	2.5 km	MPC · JPL
449643	2014 KF_{29}	—	September 30, 2011	Kitt Peak	Spacewatch	·	1.3 km	MPC · JPL
449644	2014 KK_{31}	—	November 19, 2007	Kitt Peak	Spacewatch	·	1.3 km	MPC · JPL
449645	2014 KX_{34}	—	January 30, 2008	Mount Lemmon	Mount Lemmon Survey	615	1.3 km	MPC · JPL
449646	2014 KN_{41}	—	December 3, 2008	Mount Lemmon	Mount Lemmon Survey	·	1.9 km	MPC · JPL
449647	2014 KK_{42}	—	July 18, 2010	WISE	WISE	·	3.7 km	MPC · JPL
449648	2014 KC_{43}	—	March 31, 2008	Mount Lemmon	Mount Lemmon Survey	·	2.6 km	MPC · JPL
449649	2014 KX_{50}	—	March 13, 2007	Kitt Peak	Spacewatch	·	680 m	MPC · JPL
449650	2014 KT_{51}	—	July 9, 2005	Kitt Peak	Spacewatch	·	1.9 km	MPC · JPL
449651	2014 KV_{51}	—	March 15, 2008	Mount Lemmon	Mount Lemmon Survey	·	2.1 km	MPC · JPL
449652	2014 KK_{52}	—	February 3, 2009	Kitt Peak	Spacewatch	·	1.1 km	MPC · JPL
449653	2014 KU_{55}	—	September 3, 2002	Palomar	NEAT	MAR	1.0 km	MPC · JPL
449654	2014 KS_{57}	—	December 3, 2008	Mount Lemmon	Mount Lemmon Survey	·	870 m	MPC · JPL
449655	2014 KP_{58}	—	April 6, 2005	Mount Lemmon	Mount Lemmon Survey	·	1.8 km	MPC · JPL
449656	2014 KG_{62}	—	November 12, 2005	Kitt Peak	Spacewatch	·	910 m	MPC · JPL
449657	2014 KS_{70}	—	December 7, 2005	Kitt Peak	Spacewatch	·	3.2 km	MPC · JPL
449658	2014 KP_{71}	—	November 18, 2011	Mount Lemmon	Mount Lemmon Survey	EOS	1.8 km	MPC · JPL
449659	2014 KR_{73}	—	April 26, 2001	Kitt Peak	Spacewatch	·	1.3 km	MPC · JPL
449660	2014 KP_{74}	—	May 22, 2014	Mount Lemmon	Mount Lemmon Survey	V	570 m	MPC · JPL
449661	2014 KS_{77}	—	August 10, 2010	Kitt Peak	Spacewatch	ADE	1.6 km	MPC · JPL
449662	2014 KB_{79}	—	September 29, 2011	Mount Lemmon	Mount Lemmon Survey	·	1 km	MPC · JPL
449663	2014 KA_{80}	—	April 20, 2004	Siding Spring	SSS	·	900 m	MPC · JPL
449664	2014 KT_{80}	—	December 3, 2008	Mount Lemmon	Mount Lemmon Survey	·	1.2 km	MPC · JPL
449665	2014 KW_{80}	—	March 24, 2003	Kitt Peak	Spacewatch	V	740 m	MPC · JPL
449666	2014 KH_{81}	—	December 4, 2007	Kitt Peak	Spacewatch	·	1.8 km	MPC · JPL
449667	2014 KH_{83}	—	May 8, 2005	Kitt Peak	Spacewatch	·	1.6 km	MPC · JPL
449668	2014 KS_{83}	—	March 11, 2005	Anderson Mesa	LONEOS	·	2.1 km	MPC · JPL
449669	2014 KS_{84}	—	December 13, 2004	Kitt Peak	Spacewatch	H	530 m	MPC · JPL
449670	2014 KO_{85}	—	January 19, 2009	Mount Lemmon	Mount Lemmon Survey	·	2.1 km	MPC · JPL
449671	2014 KR_{85}	—	March 1, 2005	Catalina	CSS	·	1.7 km	MPC · JPL
449672	2014 KW_{85}	—	December 28, 2005	Kitt Peak	Spacewatch	·	2.0 km	MPC · JPL
449673	2014 KX_{85}	—	January 15, 1996	Kitt Peak	Spacewatch	·	840 m	MPC · JPL
449674	2014 KV_{90}	—	October 30, 2007	Mount Lemmon	Mount Lemmon Survey	RAF	960 m	MPC · JPL
449675	2014 KW_{92}	—	October 29, 2010	Mount Lemmon	Mount Lemmon Survey	·	2.3 km	MPC · JPL
449676	2014 KW_{93}	—	November 3, 2005	Mount Lemmon	Mount Lemmon Survey	·	3.4 km	MPC · JPL
449677	2014 KX_{94}	—	May 30, 2014	Mount Lemmon	Mount Lemmon Survey	·	3.8 km	MPC · JPL
449678	2014 KQ_{97}	—	November 18, 2006	Kitt Peak	Spacewatch	·	1.8 km	MPC · JPL
449679	2014 KK_{100}	—	October 12, 2007	Mount Lemmon	Mount Lemmon Survey	·	1.1 km	MPC · JPL
449680	2014 KC_{101}	—	March 16, 2007	Kitt Peak	Spacewatch	·	2.0 km	MPC · JPL
449681	2014 LC_{3}	—	January 1, 2003	Kitt Peak	Spacewatch	·	630 m	MPC · JPL
449682	2014 LF_{3}	—	November 12, 2007	Mount Lemmon	Mount Lemmon Survey	·	900 m	MPC · JPL
449683	2014 LZ_{6}	—	June 7, 2007	Kitt Peak	Spacewatch	·	880 m	MPC · JPL
449684	2014 LE_{7}	—	July 1, 2011	Mount Lemmon	Mount Lemmon Survey	·	660 m	MPC · JPL
449685	2014 LP_{12}	—	December 15, 2007	Mount Lemmon	Mount Lemmon Survey	MAR	1.1 km	MPC · JPL
449686	2014 LK_{14}	—	February 6, 2010	Mount Lemmon	Mount Lemmon Survey	·	870 m	MPC · JPL
449687	2014 LK_{16}	—	October 28, 2010	Mount Lemmon	Mount Lemmon Survey	·	3.5 km	MPC · JPL
449688	2014 LS_{18}	—	February 27, 2006	Kitt Peak	Spacewatch	·	1.2 km	MPC · JPL
449689	2014 LA_{19}	—	September 2, 2008	Kitt Peak	Spacewatch	V	890 m	MPC · JPL
449690	2014 LD_{19}	—	March 4, 2006	Kitt Peak	Spacewatch	·	1.2 km	MPC · JPL
449691	2014 LK_{19}	—	January 16, 2013	Mount Lemmon	Mount Lemmon Survey	·	1.0 km	MPC · JPL
449692	2014 LS_{20}	—	October 22, 2006	Catalina	CSS	·	2.9 km	MPC · JPL
449693	2014 LE_{22}	—	November 3, 2004	Kitt Peak	Spacewatch	THB	3.1 km	MPC · JPL
449694	2014 LJ_{22}	—	September 13, 2007	Mount Lemmon	Mount Lemmon Survey	·	1.0 km	MPC · JPL
449695	2014 LX_{22}	—	September 6, 2004	Socorro	LINEAR	·	2.6 km	MPC · JPL
449696	2014 LD_{23}	—	November 5, 2005	Kitt Peak	Spacewatch	·	3.7 km	MPC · JPL
449697	2014 LU_{23}	—	April 27, 2001	Socorro	LINEAR	JUN	1.2 km	MPC · JPL
449698	2014 LK_{24}	—	September 15, 2007	Mount Lemmon	Mount Lemmon Survey	·	1.7 km	MPC · JPL
449699	2014 MJ	—	January 5, 2013	Mount Lemmon	Mount Lemmon Survey	·	1.3 km	MPC · JPL
449700	2014 MH_{1}	—	December 25, 2005	Kitt Peak	Spacewatch	·	1.2 km	MPC · JPL

== 449701–449800 ==
back to top

Designation			Discovery			Properties		Ref
Permanent	Provisional	Named after	Date	Site	Discoverer(s)	Category	Diam.	Ref
449701	2014 MM_{1}	—	September 17, 2010	Mount Lemmon	Mount Lemmon Survey	·	2.3 km	MPC · JPL
449702	2014 MF_{2}	—	January 26, 2006	Kitt Peak	Spacewatch	·	1.1 km	MPC · JPL
449703	2014 MT_{6}	—	March 4, 2005	Kitt Peak	Spacewatch	·	1.2 km	MPC · JPL
449704	2014 MC_{9}	—	May 26, 2008	Kitt Peak	Spacewatch	·	2.3 km	MPC · JPL
449705	2014 MB_{11}	—	October 15, 2007	Mount Lemmon	Mount Lemmon Survey	·	2.7 km	MPC · JPL
449706	2014 MR_{14}	—	April 10, 2005	Mount Lemmon	Mount Lemmon Survey	JUN	1.2 km	MPC · JPL
449707	2014 MQ_{24}	—	March 2, 2008	Mount Lemmon	Mount Lemmon Survey	·	2.1 km	MPC · JPL
449708	2014 MT_{31}	—	March 21, 2012	Catalina	CSS	·	3.6 km	MPC · JPL
449709	2014 MH_{35}	—	July 29, 2010	WISE	WISE	·	3.6 km	MPC · JPL
449710	2014 MS_{35}	—	June 14, 2010	Mount Lemmon	Mount Lemmon Survey	·	1.6 km	MPC · JPL
449711	2014 MD_{36}	—	January 2, 2006	Mount Lemmon	Mount Lemmon Survey	·	3.3 km	MPC · JPL
449712	2014 MJ_{38}	—	March 25, 2007	Mount Lemmon	Mount Lemmon Survey	·	3.9 km	MPC · JPL
449713	2014 MQ_{38}	—	April 18, 2013	Mount Lemmon	Mount Lemmon Survey	·	2.3 km	MPC · JPL
449714	2014 MV_{43}	—	December 16, 2007	Kitt Peak	Spacewatch	·	2.2 km	MPC · JPL
449715	2014 ME_{46}	—	October 30, 2010	Mount Lemmon	Mount Lemmon Survey	EOS	2.0 km	MPC · JPL
449716	2014 MS_{48}	—	June 1, 2003	Kitt Peak	Spacewatch	·	4.7 km	MPC · JPL
449717	2014 MG_{51}	—	December 14, 2003	Kitt Peak	Spacewatch	·	2.1 km	MPC · JPL
449718	2014 MP_{54}	—	October 22, 2009	Mount Lemmon	Mount Lemmon Survey	CYB	4.0 km	MPC · JPL
449719	2014 MS_{65}	—	May 3, 2008	Kitt Peak	Spacewatch	EOS	1.7 km	MPC · JPL
449720	2014 ML_{66}	—	September 20, 2003	Kitt Peak	Spacewatch	·	3.6 km	MPC · JPL
449721	2014 NU	—	July 12, 2010	WISE	WISE	·	2.4 km	MPC · JPL
449722	2014 NY_{1}	—	March 2, 2009	Kitt Peak	Spacewatch	·	2.0 km	MPC · JPL
449723	2014 NQ_{2}	—	November 30, 2011	Catalina	CSS	·	3.4 km	MPC · JPL
449724	2014 NO_{16}	—	June 19, 2010	Kitt Peak	Spacewatch	BRA	1.9 km	MPC · JPL
449725	2014 NX_{16}	—	May 2, 2003	Kitt Peak	Spacewatch	·	2.5 km	MPC · JPL
449726	2014 NP_{19}	—	October 17, 1998	Kitt Peak	Spacewatch	·	3.8 km	MPC · JPL
449727	2014 NR_{19}	—	October 2, 2006	Mount Lemmon	Mount Lemmon Survey	·	2.3 km	MPC · JPL
449728	2014 NQ_{21}	—	September 18, 2009	Catalina	CSS	·	4.0 km	MPC · JPL
449729	2014 NN_{23}	—	June 19, 2004	Kitt Peak	Spacewatch	·	2.1 km	MPC · JPL
449730	2014 NR_{25}	—	April 8, 2008	Kitt Peak	Spacewatch	·	2.3 km	MPC · JPL
449731	2014 NB_{30}	—	January 1, 2008	Kitt Peak	Spacewatch	MAR	1.2 km	MPC · JPL
449732	2014 NC_{30}	—	August 26, 2009	Catalina	CSS	EOS	1.7 km	MPC · JPL
449733	2014 NN_{30}	—	January 31, 2006	Mount Lemmon	Mount Lemmon Survey	·	3.4 km	MPC · JPL
449734	2014 NQ_{31}	—	June 2, 2014	Mount Lemmon	Mount Lemmon Survey	·	1.9 km	MPC · JPL
449735	2014 NE_{33}	—	May 28, 2008	Mount Lemmon	Mount Lemmon Survey	·	2.2 km	MPC · JPL
449736	2014 NF_{38}	—	October 10, 2004	Socorro	LINEAR	·	3.8 km	MPC · JPL
449737	2014 NG_{39}	—	September 15, 2009	Mount Lemmon	Mount Lemmon Survey	·	2.6 km	MPC · JPL
449738	2014 NC_{46}	—	December 12, 1999	Kitt Peak	Spacewatch	EOS	1.9 km	MPC · JPL
449739	2014 NG_{48}	—	September 19, 2009	Mount Lemmon	Mount Lemmon Survey	·	3.0 km	MPC · JPL
449740	2014 NR_{52}	—	December 14, 2010	Mount Lemmon	Mount Lemmon Survey	VER	3.3 km	MPC · JPL
449741	2014 NM_{54}	—	November 27, 2010	Mount Lemmon	Mount Lemmon Survey	·	2.8 km	MPC · JPL
449742	2014 NG_{58}	—	September 27, 2009	Mount Lemmon	Mount Lemmon Survey	·	3.1 km	MPC · JPL
449743	2014 NM_{60}	—	October 21, 2009	Catalina	CSS	·	3.6 km	MPC · JPL
449744	2014 NL_{61}	—	January 16, 2004	Kitt Peak	Spacewatch	·	2.2 km	MPC · JPL
449745	2014 OU_{4}	—	January 19, 2012	Haleakala	Pan-STARRS 1	EOS	2.3 km	MPC · JPL
449746	2014 OG_{6}	—	December 25, 2005	Kitt Peak	Spacewatch	·	4.0 km	MPC · JPL
449747	2014 OJ_{6}	—	January 30, 2012	Kitt Peak	Spacewatch	·	2.6 km	MPC · JPL
449748	2014 ON_{8}	—	February 28, 2008	Kitt Peak	Spacewatch	·	2.0 km	MPC · JPL
449749	2014 OF_{16}	—	April 18, 2009	Kitt Peak	Spacewatch	·	930 m	MPC · JPL
449750	2014 OO_{17}	—	January 9, 2007	Mount Lemmon	Mount Lemmon Survey	615	1.4 km	MPC · JPL
449751	2014 OK_{22}	—	November 19, 2006	Catalina	CSS	·	2.1 km	MPC · JPL
449752	2014 OH_{32}	—	August 16, 2009	Kitt Peak	Spacewatch	·	2.2 km	MPC · JPL
449753	2014 OO_{32}	—	April 14, 2008	Mount Lemmon	Mount Lemmon Survey	·	2.2 km	MPC · JPL
449754	2014 ON_{33}	—	June 13, 2005	Kitt Peak	Spacewatch	·	1.4 km	MPC · JPL
449755	2014 OV_{33}	—	November 30, 2005	Kitt Peak	Spacewatch	·	2.1 km	MPC · JPL
449756	2014 OP_{37}	—	February 29, 2004	Kitt Peak	Spacewatch	·	1.3 km	MPC · JPL
449757	2014 OT_{38}	—	September 5, 2010	Mount Lemmon	Mount Lemmon Survey	·	1.6 km	MPC · JPL
449758	2014 OD_{39}	—	January 21, 2012	Kitt Peak	Spacewatch	·	1.6 km	MPC · JPL
449759	2014 OQ_{40}	—	September 27, 2006	Mount Lemmon	Mount Lemmon Survey	·	1.9 km	MPC · JPL
449760	2014 OG_{49}	—	December 27, 1999	Kitt Peak	Spacewatch	·	2.9 km	MPC · JPL
449761	2014 OD_{53}	—	March 30, 2008	Kitt Peak	Spacewatch	·	2.3 km	MPC · JPL
449762	2014 OT_{65}	—	January 28, 1998	Kitt Peak	Spacewatch	·	2.2 km	MPC · JPL
449763	2014 OC_{67}	—	January 27, 2007	Mount Lemmon	Mount Lemmon Survey	·	1.6 km	MPC · JPL
449764	2014 OM_{67}	—	November 7, 2010	Mount Lemmon	Mount Lemmon Survey	(159)	2.7 km	MPC · JPL
449765	2014 OO_{70}	—	January 2, 2011	Catalina	CSS	·	3.4 km	MPC · JPL
449766	2014 OG_{71}	—	December 25, 2005	Kitt Peak	Spacewatch	·	2.4 km	MPC · JPL
449767	2014 OX_{79}	—	June 12, 2010	WISE	WISE	·	1.7 km	MPC · JPL
449768	2014 OJ_{80}	—	December 8, 2005	Mount Lemmon	Mount Lemmon Survey	EMA	3.3 km	MPC · JPL
449769	2014 OD_{85}	—	May 8, 2008	Kitt Peak	Spacewatch	·	2.3 km	MPC · JPL
449770	2014 OE_{88}	—	April 11, 2013	Mount Lemmon	Mount Lemmon Survey	VER	2.6 km	MPC · JPL
449771	2014 OC_{91}	—	September 16, 2003	Kitt Peak	Spacewatch	·	4.2 km	MPC · JPL
449772	2014 OV_{92}	—	October 29, 2005	Mount Lemmon	Mount Lemmon Survey	·	1.8 km	MPC · JPL
449773	2014 OP_{105}	—	January 31, 2006	Kitt Peak	Spacewatch	·	2.6 km	MPC · JPL
449774	2014 OA_{107}	—	September 12, 2004	Kitt Peak	Spacewatch	EOS	2.4 km	MPC · JPL
449775	2014 OK_{107}	—	December 5, 2010	Mount Lemmon	Mount Lemmon Survey	·	2.9 km	MPC · JPL
449776	2014 OL_{113}	—	April 14, 2008	Mount Lemmon	Mount Lemmon Survey	·	2.1 km	MPC · JPL
449777	2014 OW_{122}	—	September 30, 2006	Mount Lemmon	Mount Lemmon Survey	(11882)	1.8 km	MPC · JPL
449778	2014 OX_{122}	—	October 15, 2007	Catalina	CSS	T_{j} (2.98) · 3:2	5.3 km	MPC · JPL
449779	2014 OT_{134}	—	January 19, 2012	Haleakala	Pan-STARRS 1	·	2.7 km	MPC · JPL
449780	2014 OM_{136}	—	December 28, 2000	Kitt Peak	Spacewatch	EOS	1.9 km	MPC · JPL
449781	2014 OG_{155}	—	March 6, 2008	Mount Lemmon	Mount Lemmon Survey	·	1.7 km	MPC · JPL
449782	2014 OU_{155}	—	April 12, 2004	Kitt Peak	Spacewatch	·	1.6 km	MPC · JPL
449783	2014 OQ_{158}	—	September 29, 2010	Mount Lemmon	Mount Lemmon Survey	·	1.6 km	MPC · JPL
449784	2014 OG_{159}	—	December 1, 2005	Kitt Peak	Spacewatch	·	3.6 km	MPC · JPL
449785	2014 OK_{161}	—	November 15, 2006	Kitt Peak	Spacewatch	·	1.5 km	MPC · JPL
449786	2014 OT_{162}	—	December 2, 2005	Mount Lemmon	Mount Lemmon Survey	·	2.7 km	MPC · JPL
449787	2014 OL_{176}	—	November 6, 2010	Mount Lemmon	Mount Lemmon Survey	·	3.0 km	MPC · JPL
449788	2014 OU_{181}	—	October 8, 2010	Kitt Peak	Spacewatch	·	4.0 km	MPC · JPL
449789	2014 OZ_{205}	—	December 25, 2005	Kitt Peak	Spacewatch	·	2.6 km	MPC · JPL
449790	2014 OB_{209}	—	December 4, 2005	Kitt Peak	Spacewatch	·	1.8 km	MPC · JPL
449791	2014 OQ_{216}	—	April 1, 1995	Kitt Peak	Spacewatch	·	1 km	MPC · JPL
449792	2014 OK_{222}	—	November 12, 2010	Kitt Peak	Spacewatch	·	3.4 km	MPC · JPL
449793	2014 OR_{224}	—	October 28, 2010	Mount Lemmon	Mount Lemmon Survey	·	1.5 km	MPC · JPL
449794	2014 OG_{233}	—	May 1, 2013	Mount Lemmon	Mount Lemmon Survey	·	3.2 km	MPC · JPL
449795	2014 ON_{235}	—	September 17, 2006	Catalina	CSS	·	2.0 km	MPC · JPL
449796	2014 OQ_{236}	—	October 4, 2004	Kitt Peak	Spacewatch	·	2.3 km	MPC · JPL
449797	2014 OH_{254}	—	October 6, 2005	Mount Lemmon	Mount Lemmon Survey	·	1.7 km	MPC · JPL
449798	2014 OY_{258}	—	February 1, 2012	Mount Lemmon	Mount Lemmon Survey	·	3.2 km	MPC · JPL
449799	2014 OL_{259}	—	December 25, 2005	Kitt Peak	Spacewatch	·	2.7 km	MPC · JPL
449800	2014 OJ_{272}	—	October 16, 2006	Catalina	CSS	·	1.9 km	MPC · JPL

== 449801–449900 ==
back to top

Designation			Discovery			Properties		Ref
Permanent	Provisional	Named after	Date	Site	Discoverer(s)	Category	Diam.	Ref
449801	2014 OC_{285}	—	December 5, 2010	Kitt Peak	Spacewatch	·	3.3 km	MPC · JPL
449802	2014 OH_{301}	—	December 10, 2010	Mount Lemmon	Mount Lemmon Survey	·	2.6 km	MPC · JPL
449803	2014 OA_{305}	—	April 14, 2008	Mount Lemmon	Mount Lemmon Survey	EOS	1.7 km	MPC · JPL
449804	2014 OO_{306}	—	January 30, 2006	Kitt Peak	Spacewatch	·	2.4 km	MPC · JPL
449805	2014 OE_{310}	—	September 15, 2004	Kitt Peak	Spacewatch	·	1.9 km	MPC · JPL
449806	2014 OX_{310}	—	January 26, 2012	Mount Lemmon	Mount Lemmon Survey	·	1.6 km	MPC · JPL
449807	2014 OH_{324}	—	September 7, 2004	Kitt Peak	Spacewatch	·	1.8 km	MPC · JPL
449808	2014 OJ_{327}	—	February 7, 2008	Kitt Peak	Spacewatch	·	2.0 km	MPC · JPL
449809	2014 OJ_{331}	—	October 22, 1995	Kitt Peak	Spacewatch	KOR	1.2 km	MPC · JPL
449810	2014 OO_{337}	—	April 26, 2008	Mount Lemmon	Mount Lemmon Survey	·	3.1 km	MPC · JPL
449811	2014 OH_{344}	—	January 4, 2012	Mount Lemmon	Mount Lemmon Survey	·	2.2 km	MPC · JPL
449812	2014 OL_{346}	—	November 27, 2010	Mount Lemmon	Mount Lemmon Survey	·	2.2 km	MPC · JPL
449813	2014 OW_{348}	—	October 13, 2001	Kitt Peak	Spacewatch	·	2.3 km	MPC · JPL
449814	2014 OO_{353}	—	August 18, 2009	Kitt Peak	Spacewatch	·	2.5 km	MPC · JPL
449815	2014 OF_{357}	—	February 1, 2006	Mount Lemmon	Mount Lemmon Survey	VER	2.2 km	MPC · JPL
449816	2014 OT_{362}	—	December 30, 2000	Kitt Peak	Spacewatch	·	1.9 km	MPC · JPL
449817	2014 OS_{372}	—	October 10, 2010	Kitt Peak	Spacewatch	·	3.7 km	MPC · JPL
449818	2014 OL_{379}	—	January 1, 2009	Kitt Peak	Spacewatch	·	1.2 km	MPC · JPL
449819	2014 OJ_{384}	—	December 27, 2005	Kitt Peak	Spacewatch	·	3.0 km	MPC · JPL
449820	2014 PG	—	October 22, 2011	Mount Lemmon	Mount Lemmon Survey	·	3.9 km	MPC · JPL
449821	2014 PX_{1}	—	January 13, 2008	Mount Lemmon	Mount Lemmon Survey	·	1.4 km	MPC · JPL
449822	2014 PG_{7}	—	December 4, 2005	Kitt Peak	Spacewatch	EOS	2.7 km	MPC · JPL
449823	2014 PK_{14}	—	October 25, 2005	Mount Lemmon	Mount Lemmon Survey	KOR	1.3 km	MPC · JPL
449824	2014 PZ_{18}	—	January 23, 2006	Kitt Peak	Spacewatch	·	3.0 km	MPC · JPL
449825	2014 PA_{36}	—	May 28, 2008	Mount Lemmon	Mount Lemmon Survey	·	1.9 km	MPC · JPL
449826	2014 PT_{44}	—	March 31, 2013	Mount Lemmon	Mount Lemmon Survey	·	3.1 km	MPC · JPL
449827	2014 PD_{53}	—	October 1, 2003	Kitt Peak	Spacewatch	·	3.3 km	MPC · JPL
449828	2014 PZ_{56}	—	January 15, 2010	WISE	WISE	·	4.0 km	MPC · JPL
449829	2014 QR_{1}	—	August 23, 2003	Palomar	NEAT	TIR	2.4 km	MPC · JPL
449830	2014 QY_{34}	—	February 28, 2008	Mount Lemmon	Mount Lemmon Survey	·	2.1 km	MPC · JPL
449831	2014 QN_{36}	—	November 26, 2005	Mount Lemmon	Mount Lemmon Survey	·	1.8 km	MPC · JPL
449832	2014 QH_{97}	—	September 16, 2009	Mount Lemmon	Mount Lemmon Survey	EOS	2.1 km	MPC · JPL
449833	2014 QS_{101}	—	October 22, 2005	Kitt Peak	Spacewatch	·	1.8 km	MPC · JPL
449834	2014 QR_{241}	—	January 21, 2006	Mount Lemmon	Mount Lemmon Survey	·	3.2 km	MPC · JPL
449835	2014 QL_{271}	—	April 14, 2004	Kitt Peak	Spacewatch	·	2.1 km	MPC · JPL
449836	2014 QS_{277}	—	November 25, 2005	Kitt Peak	Spacewatch	KOR	1.5 km	MPC · JPL
449837	2014 QG_{310}	—	May 3, 1997	Kitt Peak	Spacewatch	·	3.0 km	MPC · JPL
449838	2014 QR_{337}	—	March 14, 2012	Mount Lemmon	Mount Lemmon Survey	·	2.8 km	MPC · JPL
449839	2014 QC_{341}	—	September 27, 2003	Kitt Peak	Spacewatch	·	2.6 km	MPC · JPL
449840	2014 QP_{341}	—	January 27, 2007	Mount Lemmon	Mount Lemmon Survey	EOS	1.9 km	MPC · JPL
449841	2014 QR_{378}	—	March 5, 2006	Kitt Peak	Spacewatch	·	3.2 km	MPC · JPL
449842	2014 QS_{405}	—	March 21, 2001	Kitt Peak	Spacewatch	·	3.2 km	MPC · JPL
449843	2014 QK_{418}	—	February 1, 2010	WISE	WISE	·	3.3 km	MPC · JPL
449844	2014 QZ_{421}	—	March 13, 2007	Kitt Peak	Spacewatch	·	2.7 km	MPC · JPL
449845	2014 SJ_{86}	—	May 7, 2007	Kitt Peak	Spacewatch	(1118)	5.7 km	MPC · JPL
449846	2014 SX_{126}	—	February 25, 2006	Kitt Peak	Spacewatch	·	2.9 km	MPC · JPL
449847	2014 SW_{198}	—	September 7, 2008	Mount Lemmon	Mount Lemmon Survey	·	3.3 km	MPC · JPL
449848	2014 SL_{227}	—	September 24, 2009	Catalina	CSS	·	3.8 km	MPC · JPL
449849	2014 SF_{289}	—	July 9, 2005	Kitt Peak	Spacewatch	EUN	1.9 km	MPC · JPL
449850	2014 UB_{213}	—	January 30, 2010	WISE	WISE	·	2.9 km	MPC · JPL
449851	2014 UU_{213}	—	September 17, 2004	Anderson Mesa	LONEOS	·	3.0 km	MPC · JPL
449852	2015 KV_{36}	—	May 21, 2006	Kitt Peak	Spacewatch	·	1.3 km	MPC · JPL
449853	2015 KF_{37}	—	October 11, 2007	Mount Lemmon	Mount Lemmon Survey	·	1.5 km	MPC · JPL
449854	2015 LV_{28}	—	December 30, 2000	Kitt Peak	Spacewatch	·	4.6 km	MPC · JPL
449855	2015 LP_{32}	—	January 15, 2009	Kitt Peak	Spacewatch	GEF	1.3 km	MPC · JPL
449856	2015 LO_{33}	—	September 6, 2008	Catalina	CSS	NYS	900 m	MPC · JPL
449857	2015 MS_{6}	—	August 25, 2004	Kitt Peak	Spacewatch	·	1.0 km	MPC · JPL
449858	2015 MM_{8}	—	June 8, 2008	Kitt Peak	Spacewatch	V	670 m	MPC · JPL
449859	2015 ME_{9}	—	March 6, 2014	Catalina	CSS	EUN	1.6 km	MPC · JPL
449860	2015 ML_{45}	—	October 17, 2007	Catalina	CSS	MAR	1.1 km	MPC · JPL
449861	2015 MM_{45}	—	November 20, 2001	Socorro	LINEAR	·	1.1 km	MPC · JPL
449862	2015 ML_{47}	—	December 14, 2007	Mount Lemmon	Mount Lemmon Survey	·	2.2 km	MPC · JPL
449863	2015 ME_{49}	—	September 10, 2007	Kitt Peak	Spacewatch	KON	2.5 km	MPC · JPL
449864	2015 MT_{50}	—	February 2, 2013	Mount Lemmon	Mount Lemmon Survey	MAR	1 km	MPC · JPL
449865	2015 MO_{52}	—	January 10, 2007	Mount Lemmon	Mount Lemmon Survey	T_{j} (2.99)	6.6 km	MPC · JPL
449866	2015 MQ_{57}	—	December 4, 2007	Kitt Peak	Spacewatch	·	2.3 km	MPC · JPL
449867	2015 MS_{57}	—	June 19, 1998	Kitt Peak	Spacewatch	·	1.3 km	MPC · JPL
449868	2015 MN_{58}	—	September 17, 2003	Kitt Peak	Spacewatch	·	1.6 km	MPC · JPL
449869	2015 MR_{58}	—	September 11, 2004	Socorro	LINEAR	·	1.6 km	MPC · JPL
449870	2015 MS_{58}	—	August 3, 2004	Siding Spring	SSS	LIX	3.7 km	MPC · JPL
449871	2015 MY_{58}	—	December 13, 2006	Mount Lemmon	Mount Lemmon Survey	·	3.4 km	MPC · JPL
449872	2015 MZ_{58}	—	April 25, 2006	Kitt Peak	Spacewatch	ADE	2.0 km	MPC · JPL
449873	2015 MG_{66}	—	June 26, 2011	Mount Lemmon	Mount Lemmon Survey	MAR	1.2 km	MPC · JPL
449874	2015 MK_{66}	—	June 15, 2010	Mount Lemmon	Mount Lemmon Survey	·	2.6 km	MPC · JPL
449875	2015 ML_{66}	—	April 19, 2006	Kitt Peak	Spacewatch	·	2.4 km	MPC · JPL
449876	2015 MP_{67}	—	February 22, 2007	Kitt Peak	Spacewatch	·	1.1 km	MPC · JPL
449877	2015 MQ_{67}	—	April 27, 2011	Catalina	CSS	V	830 m	MPC · JPL
449878	2015 MA_{73}	—	February 9, 2010	Mount Lemmon	Mount Lemmon Survey	·	1.3 km	MPC · JPL
449879	2015 MT_{80}	—	October 26, 2009	Mount Lemmon	Mount Lemmon Survey	·	630 m	MPC · JPL
449880	2015 MH_{81}	—	May 4, 2009	Mount Lemmon	Mount Lemmon Survey	·	1.8 km	MPC · JPL
449881	2015 MG_{82}	—	September 5, 2008	Kitt Peak	Spacewatch	·	1.3 km	MPC · JPL
449882	2015 MC_{84}	—	June 28, 2005	Kitt Peak	Spacewatch	·	2.3 km	MPC · JPL
449883	2015 MW_{84}	—	September 18, 2010	Mount Lemmon	Mount Lemmon Survey	·	2.9 km	MPC · JPL
449884	2015 MC_{85}	—	August 31, 2005	Kitt Peak	Spacewatch	·	1.7 km	MPC · JPL
449885	2015 MY_{88}	—	September 2, 2008	Kitt Peak	Spacewatch	·	970 m	MPC · JPL
449886	2015 MC_{90}	—	October 16, 2003	Kitt Peak	Spacewatch	EUN	1.1 km	MPC · JPL
449887	2015 MH_{90}	—	September 24, 2011	Mount Lemmon	Mount Lemmon Survey	·	1.6 km	MPC · JPL
449888	2015 MW_{90}	—	April 29, 2006	Kitt Peak	Spacewatch	MAR	840 m	MPC · JPL
449889	2015 MX_{97}	—	August 21, 2006	Kitt Peak	Spacewatch	·	2.3 km	MPC · JPL
449890	2015 MT_{98}	—	November 22, 2005	Kitt Peak	Spacewatch	·	1 km	MPC · JPL
449891	2015 MM_{103}	—	April 8, 2008	Mount Lemmon	Mount Lemmon Survey	·	2.8 km	MPC · JPL
449892	2015 MQ_{103}	—	March 14, 2007	Mount Lemmon	Mount Lemmon Survey	·	1.3 km	MPC · JPL
449893	2015 MR_{103}	—	May 6, 2011	Mount Lemmon	Mount Lemmon Survey	·	720 m	MPC · JPL
449894	2015 MU_{103}	—	January 20, 2013	Kitt Peak	Spacewatch	·	2.2 km	MPC · JPL
449895	2015 ML_{106}	—	March 13, 2007	Mount Lemmon	Mount Lemmon Survey	·	870 m	MPC · JPL
449896	2015 MO_{106}	—	September 7, 2004	Kitt Peak	Spacewatch	·	1.1 km	MPC · JPL
449897	2015 MC_{109}	—	December 15, 2007	Kitt Peak	Spacewatch	·	1.8 km	MPC · JPL
449898	2015 MP_{109}	—	January 15, 2008	Mount Lemmon	Mount Lemmon Survey	·	2.0 km	MPC · JPL
449899	2015 MN_{110}	—	February 12, 2004	Kitt Peak	Spacewatch	·	2.8 km	MPC · JPL
449900	2015 MQ_{111}	—	April 9, 2006	Kitt Peak	Spacewatch	·	2.3 km	MPC · JPL

== 449901–450000 ==
back to top

Designation			Discovery			Properties		Ref
Permanent	Provisional	Named after	Date	Site	Discoverer(s)	Category	Diam.	Ref
449901	2015 MX_{112}	—	September 14, 2007	Mount Lemmon	Mount Lemmon Survey	·	1.6 km	MPC · JPL
449902	2015 MZ_{112}	—	November 19, 2008	Kitt Peak	Spacewatch	·	960 m	MPC · JPL
449903	2015 MH_{113}	—	May 16, 2010	Mount Lemmon	Mount Lemmon Survey	·	1.7 km	MPC · JPL
449904	2015 MN_{115}	—	September 1, 2005	Kitt Peak	Spacewatch	·	1.5 km	MPC · JPL
449905	2015 MT_{117}	—	February 17, 2007	Kitt Peak	Spacewatch	MAS	830 m	MPC · JPL
449906	2015 MY_{125}	—	October 28, 2005	Mount Lemmon	Mount Lemmon Survey	·	2.4 km	MPC · JPL
449907	2015 MK_{127}	—	September 23, 2011	Kitt Peak	Spacewatch	·	1.8 km	MPC · JPL
449908	2015 MQ_{127}	—	November 1, 2005	Catalina	CSS	EOS	3.3 km	MPC · JPL
449909	2015 MF_{128}	—	October 7, 2004	Socorro	LINEAR	·	1.8 km	MPC · JPL
449910	2015 MZ_{128}	—	December 16, 2003	Kitt Peak	Spacewatch	MAR	1.1 km	MPC · JPL
449911	2015 NB_{3}	—	October 12, 2004	Socorro	LINEAR	·	5.3 km	MPC · JPL
449912	2015 NB_{4}	—	March 26, 2011	Mount Lemmon	Mount Lemmon Survey	V	630 m	MPC · JPL
449913	2015 NO_{4}	—	July 22, 1995	Kitt Peak	Spacewatch	·	1.6 km	MPC · JPL
449914	2015 NS_{8}	—	December 28, 2005	Kitt Peak	Spacewatch	·	690 m	MPC · JPL
449915	2015 NP_{9}	—	August 30, 2005	Kitt Peak	Spacewatch	·	550 m	MPC · JPL
449916	2015 NQ_{15}	—	February 2, 2006	Kitt Peak	Spacewatch	·	1.2 km	MPC · JPL
449917	2015 NH_{17}	—	January 19, 2008	Kitt Peak	Spacewatch	·	2.6 km	MPC · JPL
449918	2015 NB_{24}	—	September 13, 2007	Mount Lemmon	Mount Lemmon Survey	·	1.2 km	MPC · JPL
449919	2015 NR_{24}	—	May 23, 2011	Kitt Peak	Spacewatch	·	1.2 km	MPC · JPL
449920	2015 NT_{24}	—	October 8, 2008	Kitt Peak	Spacewatch	·	1.2 km	MPC · JPL
449921	2015 OD_{2}	—	March 5, 2006	Kitt Peak	Spacewatch	·	1.8 km	MPC · JPL
449922 Bailey	2015 OM_{9}	Bailey	June 9, 2010	WISE	WISE	·	4.1 km	MPC · JPL
449923	2015 OH_{13}	—	October 22, 2005	Kitt Peak	Spacewatch	·	2.2 km	MPC · JPL
449924	2015 OJ_{13}	—	December 29, 2003	Kitt Peak	Spacewatch	·	2.0 km	MPC · JPL
449925	2015 OY_{14}	—	March 9, 2002	Kitt Peak	Spacewatch	·	780 m	MPC · JPL
449926	2015 OL_{15}	—	November 27, 2011	Mount Lemmon	Mount Lemmon Survey	EMA	2.7 km	MPC · JPL
449927	2015 OX_{18}	—	February 21, 2007	Mount Lemmon	Mount Lemmon Survey	·	1.0 km	MPC · JPL
449928	2015 OJ_{23}	—	October 3, 2005	Catalina	CSS	·	910 m	MPC · JPL
449929	2015 OT_{23}	—	May 24, 2000	Kitt Peak	Spacewatch	NYS	1.2 km	MPC · JPL
449930	2015 OB_{24}	—	October 6, 2008	Mount Lemmon	Mount Lemmon Survey	·	1.9 km	MPC · JPL
449931	2015 OK_{24}	—	September 13, 1994	Kitt Peak	Spacewatch	·	1.3 km	MPC · JPL
449932	2015 OM_{24}	—	April 2, 2005	Mount Lemmon	Mount Lemmon Survey	·	2.0 km	MPC · JPL
449933	2015 OU_{24}	—	January 27, 2007	Mount Lemmon	Mount Lemmon Survey	NYS	1.1 km	MPC · JPL
449934	2015 OX_{25}	—	December 11, 2004	Kitt Peak	Spacewatch	EUN	1.4 km	MPC · JPL
449935	2015 ON_{33}	—	October 25, 2005	Mount Lemmon	Mount Lemmon Survey	HYG	2.7 km	MPC · JPL
449936	2015 OW_{35}	—	March 30, 2011	Mount Lemmon	Mount Lemmon Survey	·	690 m	MPC · JPL
449937	2015 OJ_{36}	—	April 30, 2006	Kitt Peak	Spacewatch	·	1.3 km	MPC · JPL
449938	2015 OB_{41}	—	March 11, 2002	Kitt Peak	Spacewatch	·	1.4 km	MPC · JPL
449939	2015 OB_{43}	—	August 29, 2006	Catalina	CSS	GEF	1.3 km	MPC · JPL
449940	2015 OK_{44}	—	October 16, 2007	Mount Lemmon	Mount Lemmon Survey	HOF	2.9 km	MPC · JPL
449941	2015 OX_{44}	—	January 30, 2008	Mount Lemmon	Mount Lemmon Survey	BRA	1.3 km	MPC · JPL
449942	2015 OE_{45}	—	December 17, 2003	Kitt Peak	Spacewatch	WIT	1.1 km	MPC · JPL
449943	2015 OF_{45}	—	March 29, 2009	Kitt Peak	Spacewatch	·	1.9 km	MPC · JPL
449944	2015 OT_{45}	—	April 7, 2006	Kitt Peak	Spacewatch	·	1.4 km	MPC · JPL
449945	2015 OD_{46}	—	December 18, 2007	Mount Lemmon	Mount Lemmon Survey	·	2.2 km	MPC · JPL
449946	2015 OY_{52}	—	October 13, 2007	Kitt Peak	Spacewatch	·	1.4 km	MPC · JPL
449947	2015 OC_{67}	—	September 7, 2000	Kitt Peak	Spacewatch	·	1.3 km	MPC · JPL
449948	2015 OJ_{68}	—	August 19, 2003	Campo Imperatore	CINEOS	·	1 km	MPC · JPL
449949	2015 OT_{73}	—	July 3, 2011	Mount Lemmon	Mount Lemmon Survey	·	1.1 km	MPC · JPL
449950	2015 OB_{75}	—	January 28, 2007	Mount Lemmon	Mount Lemmon Survey	EOS	1.9 km	MPC · JPL
449951	2015 OW_{75}	—	January 29, 1995	Kitt Peak	Spacewatch	ADE	1.6 km	MPC · JPL
449952	2015 OL_{76}	—	November 4, 2010	Mount Lemmon	Mount Lemmon Survey	·	3.4 km	MPC · JPL
449953	2015 OS_{76}	—	November 19, 2008	Kitt Peak	Spacewatch	·	1.3 km	MPC · JPL
449954	2015 OW_{76}	—	December 7, 2005	Kitt Peak	Spacewatch	·	2.7 km	MPC · JPL
449955	2015 OX_{76}	—	August 22, 2007	Anderson Mesa	LONEOS	·	1.4 km	MPC · JPL
449956	2015 OA_{78}	—	September 29, 1997	Xinglong	SCAP	·	1.0 km	MPC · JPL
449957	2015 PD_{1}	—	March 3, 2005	Catalina	CSS	·	2.4 km	MPC · JPL
449958	2015 PG_{2}	—	August 19, 2006	Kitt Peak	Spacewatch	·	1.9 km	MPC · JPL
449959	2015 PS_{2}	—	October 15, 2007	Catalina	CSS	EUN	1.2 km	MPC · JPL
449960	2015 PU_{2}	—	August 23, 2008	Kitt Peak	Spacewatch	V	680 m	MPC · JPL
449961	2015 PX_{2}	—	July 3, 2011	Mount Lemmon	Mount Lemmon Survey	·	1.6 km	MPC · JPL
449962	2015 PF_{3}	—	October 13, 2010	Mount Lemmon	Mount Lemmon Survey	·	2.9 km	MPC · JPL
449963	2015 PT_{3}	—	February 22, 2006	Kitt Peak	Spacewatch	·	1.5 km	MPC · JPL
449964	2015 PW_{4}	—	June 5, 2011	Mount Lemmon	Mount Lemmon Survey	·	1.6 km	MPC · JPL
449965	2015 PZ_{4}	—	August 12, 2010	Kitt Peak	Spacewatch	·	2.1 km	MPC · JPL
449966	2015 PW_{7}	—	March 21, 2002	Kitt Peak	Spacewatch	·	1.1 km	MPC · JPL
449967	2015 PA_{8}	—	April 13, 2010	WISE	WISE	·	2.4 km	MPC · JPL
449968	2015 PU_{12}	—	November 30, 2005	Mount Lemmon	Mount Lemmon Survey	·	710 m	MPC · JPL
449969	2015 PN_{30}	—	September 20, 2001	Kitt Peak	Spacewatch	·	980 m	MPC · JPL
449970	2015 PV_{30}	—	August 6, 2010	WISE	WISE	·	4.6 km	MPC · JPL
449971	2015 PV_{35}	—	August 28, 2005	Kitt Peak	Spacewatch	EOS	1.8 km	MPC · JPL
449972	2015 PX_{35}	—	September 29, 2005	Kitt Peak	Spacewatch	EOS	1.9 km	MPC · JPL
449973	2015 PM_{37}	—	February 9, 2005	Kitt Peak	Spacewatch	·	1.2 km	MPC · JPL
449974	2015 PW_{37}	—	August 19, 2006	Kitt Peak	Spacewatch	·	1.8 km	MPC · JPL
449975	2015 PY_{37}	—	July 30, 2008	Kitt Peak	Spacewatch	V	540 m	MPC · JPL
449976	2015 PG_{39}	—	August 29, 2005	Anderson Mesa	LONEOS	·	2.2 km	MPC · JPL
449977	2015 PU_{44}	—	October 9, 2005	Kitt Peak	Spacewatch	EOS	1.6 km	MPC · JPL
449978	2015 PA_{47}	—	April 14, 2005	Kitt Peak	Spacewatch	·	1.9 km	MPC · JPL
449979	2015 PX_{47}	—	March 29, 2008	Mount Lemmon	Mount Lemmon Survey	·	2.1 km	MPC · JPL
449980	2015 PB_{48}	—	October 2, 2003	Kitt Peak	Spacewatch	·	1.1 km	MPC · JPL
449981	2015 PQ_{75}	—	June 14, 2010	WISE	WISE	·	2.8 km	MPC · JPL
449982	2015 PH_{77}	—	February 6, 2007	Mount Lemmon	Mount Lemmon Survey	·	4.4 km	MPC · JPL
449983	2015 PJ_{97}	—	November 18, 2008	Kitt Peak	Spacewatch	·	1.1 km	MPC · JPL
449984	2015 PN_{116}	—	August 24, 1998	Caussols	ODAS	·	1.4 km	MPC · JPL
449985	2015 PS_{122}	—	July 21, 2006	Mount Lemmon	Mount Lemmon Survey	·	2.0 km	MPC · JPL
449986	2015 PX_{127}	—	January 27, 2007	Mount Lemmon	Mount Lemmon Survey	·	4.3 km	MPC · JPL
449987	2015 PE_{132}	—	December 7, 2005	Catalina	CSS	·	970 m	MPC · JPL
449988	2015 PK_{132}	—	March 29, 2011	Mount Lemmon	Mount Lemmon Survey	·	550 m	MPC · JPL
449989	2015 PU_{143}	—	April 13, 2010	Catalina	CSS	·	2.8 km	MPC · JPL
449990	2015 PS_{153}	—	October 19, 2011	Kitt Peak	Spacewatch	·	2.0 km	MPC · JPL
449991	2015 PB_{165}	—	October 3, 2003	Kitt Peak	Spacewatch	(5)	670 m	MPC · JPL
449992	2015 PF_{171}	—	September 12, 2001	Socorro	LINEAR	·	620 m	MPC · JPL
449993	2015 PV_{202}	—	November 27, 2006	Mount Lemmon	Mount Lemmon Survey	·	4.0 km	MPC · JPL
449994	2015 PG_{221}	—	September 16, 2010	Mount Lemmon	Mount Lemmon Survey	EOS	1.9 km	MPC · JPL
449995	2015 PR_{229}	—	December 4, 2005	Kitt Peak	Spacewatch	·	2.3 km	MPC · JPL
449996	2015 PB_{230}	—	June 25, 2011	Mount Lemmon	Mount Lemmon Survey	·	1.3 km	MPC · JPL
449997	2015 PD_{230}	—	October 8, 2007	Catalina	CSS	·	1.1 km	MPC · JPL
449998	2015 PD_{237}	—	April 4, 2008	Mount Lemmon	Mount Lemmon Survey	VER	2.8 km	MPC · JPL
449999	2015 PN_{257}	—	January 27, 2007	Mount Lemmon	Mount Lemmon Survey	EOS	1.9 km	MPC · JPL
450000	2015 PB_{278}	—	October 24, 2005	Kitt Peak	Spacewatch	·	670 m	MPC · JPL

back to top

== Meaning of names ==
As minor planet discoveries are confirmed, they are given a permanent number by the IAU's Minor Planet Center (MPC), and the discoverers can then submit names for them, following the IAU's naming conventions. The list below concerns those minor planets in the specified number-range that have received names, and explains the meanings of those names.

Official naming citations of newly named small Solar System bodies are approved and published in a bulletin by IAU's Working Group for Small Bodies Nomenclature (WGSBN). Before May 2021, citations were published in MPC's Minor Planet Circulars for many decades. Recent citations can also be found on the JPL Small-Body Database (SBDB). Until his death in 2016, German astronomer Lutz D. Schmadel compiled these citations into the Dictionary of Minor Planet Names (DMP) and regularly updated the collection.

Based on Paul Herget's The Names of the Minor Planets, Schmadel also researched the unclear origin of numerous asteroids, most of which had been named prior to World War II. This article incorporates text from this source, which is in the public domain: SBDB New namings may only be added to this list below after official publication as the preannouncement of names is condemned. The WGSBN publishes a comprehensive guideline for the naming rules of non-cometary small Solar System bodies.

Named minor planet	Provisional	This minor planet was named for...	Ref · Catalog
449922 Bailey	2015 OM_{9}	Ronald W. Bailey (born 1958) supported mission operations for NASA spacecraft including Topex, Jason and WISE/NEOWISE in a career that spanned more than 35 years.	JPL · 449922
