= List of minor planets: 305001–306000 =

The following is a partial list of minor planets, running from minor-planet number 305001 through 306000, inclusive. The primary data for this and other partial lists is based on JPL's "Small-Body Orbital Elements" and data available from the Minor Planet Center. Critical list information is also provided by the MPC, unless otherwise specified from Lowell Observatory. A detailed description of the table's columns and additional sources are given on the main page including a complete list of every page in this series, and a statistical break-up on the dynamical classification of minor planets.

Also see the summary list of all named bodies in numerical and alphabetical order, and the corresponding naming citations for the number range of this particular list. New namings may only be added to this list after official publication, as the preannouncement of names is condemned by the Working Group for Small Bodies Nomenclature of the International Astronomical Union.

Near-Earth obj.	MBA (inner)	MBA (outer)	Centaur
Mars-crosser	MBA (middle)	Jupiter trojan	Trans-Neptunian obj.
Unclassified

== 305001–305100 ==
Designation			Discovery			Properties		Ref
Permanent	Provisional	Named after	Date	Site	Discoverer(s)	Category	Diam.	Ref
305001	2007 TQ_{267}	—	October 9, 2007	Kitt Peak	Spacewatch	·	1.4 km	MPC · JPL
305002	2007 TQ_{269}	—	October 9, 2007	Kitt Peak	Spacewatch	·	1.5 km	MPC · JPL
305003	2007 TW_{289}	—	October 12, 2007	Catalina	CSS	·	1.7 km	MPC · JPL
305004	2007 TR_{290}	—	October 12, 2007	Mount Lemmon	Mount Lemmon Survey	·	2.4 km	MPC · JPL
305005	2007 TX_{319}	—	October 12, 2007	Kitt Peak	Spacewatch	·	1.6 km	MPC · JPL
305006	2007 TC_{322}	—	October 10, 2007	Lulin	LUSS	·	1.9 km	MPC · JPL
305007	2007 TT_{328}	—	October 11, 2007	Kitt Peak	Spacewatch	(5)	1.4 km	MPC · JPL
305008	2007 TU_{330}	—	October 11, 2007	Kitt Peak	Spacewatch	·	2.7 km	MPC · JPL
305009	2007 TL_{331}	—	October 11, 2007	Kitt Peak	Spacewatch	·	1.4 km	MPC · JPL
305010	2007 TM_{332}	—	October 11, 2007	Kitt Peak	Spacewatch	·	1.4 km	MPC · JPL
305011	2007 TY_{334}	—	October 11, 2007	Kitt Peak	Spacewatch	·	1.6 km	MPC · JPL
305012	2007 TB_{339}	—	October 15, 2007	Kitt Peak	Spacewatch	·	1.1 km	MPC · JPL
305013	2007 TN_{343}	—	October 10, 2007	Mount Lemmon	Mount Lemmon Survey	·	1.5 km	MPC · JPL
305014	2007 TT_{355}	—	October 11, 2007	Catalina	CSS	·	2.2 km	MPC · JPL
305015	2007 TO_{357}	—	October 13, 2007	Catalina	CSS	V	930 m	MPC · JPL
305016	2007 TS_{360}	—	October 14, 2007	Mount Lemmon	Mount Lemmon Survey	·	1.7 km	MPC · JPL
305017	2007 TS_{361}	—	October 14, 2007	Mount Lemmon	Mount Lemmon Survey	(5)	1.3 km	MPC · JPL
305018	2007 TF_{362}	—	October 14, 2007	Mount Lemmon	Mount Lemmon Survey	·	3.2 km	MPC · JPL
305019	2007 TH_{362}	—	October 14, 2007	Mount Lemmon	Mount Lemmon Survey	·	970 m	MPC · JPL
305020	2007 TT_{363}	—	October 14, 2007	Mount Lemmon	Mount Lemmon Survey	·	1.4 km	MPC · JPL
305021	2007 TR_{381}	—	October 14, 2007	Kitt Peak	Spacewatch	·	1.8 km	MPC · JPL
305022	2007 TK_{383}	—	October 14, 2007	Kitt Peak	Spacewatch	·	1.5 km	MPC · JPL
305023	2007 TD_{384}	—	October 14, 2007	Mount Lemmon	Mount Lemmon Survey	·	1.9 km	MPC · JPL
305024	2007 TQ_{389}	—	October 13, 2007	Catalina	CSS	·	1.7 km	MPC · JPL
305025	2007 TQ_{391}	—	October 15, 2007	Catalina	CSS	·	2.0 km	MPC · JPL
305026	2007 TT_{395}	—	October 15, 2007	Kitt Peak	Spacewatch	·	1.2 km	MPC · JPL
305027	2007 TW_{397}	—	October 15, 2007	Kitt Peak	Spacewatch	·	1.8 km	MPC · JPL
305028	2007 TD_{400}	—	October 15, 2007	Catalina	CSS	EUN	1.7 km	MPC · JPL
305029	2007 TV_{403}	—	October 15, 2007	Kitt Peak	Spacewatch	·	1.7 km	MPC · JPL
305030	2007 TZ_{404}	—	October 15, 2007	Kitt Peak	Spacewatch	·	1.3 km	MPC · JPL
305031	2007 TG_{414}	—	October 15, 2007	Catalina	CSS	EUN	1.7 km	MPC · JPL
305032	2007 TT_{418}	—	October 8, 2007	Kitt Peak	Spacewatch	·	2.0 km	MPC · JPL
305033	2007 TM_{419}	—	October 14, 2007	Mount Lemmon	Mount Lemmon Survey	·	1.1 km	MPC · JPL
305034	2007 TC_{421}	—	October 11, 2007	Catalina	CSS	HNS	1.5 km	MPC · JPL
305035	2007 TZ_{422}	—	October 14, 2007	Mount Lemmon	Mount Lemmon Survey	·	1.4 km	MPC · JPL
305036	2007 TK_{425}	—	October 8, 2007	Kitt Peak	Spacewatch	·	1.8 km	MPC · JPL
305037	2007 TU_{425}	—	October 8, 2007	Mount Lemmon	Mount Lemmon Survey	·	1.4 km	MPC · JPL
305038	2007 TQ_{426}	—	October 9, 2007	Kitt Peak	Spacewatch	·	1.3 km	MPC · JPL
305039	2007 TF_{434}	—	October 8, 2007	Catalina	CSS	·	1.5 km	MPC · JPL
305040	2007 TP_{436}	—	October 13, 2007	Mount Lemmon	Mount Lemmon Survey	(5)	1.4 km	MPC · JPL
305041	2007 TK_{449}	—	October 9, 2007	Kitt Peak	Spacewatch	·	1.7 km	MPC · JPL
305042	2007 TV_{451}	—	October 10, 2007	Kitt Peak	Spacewatch	·	1.8 km	MPC · JPL
305043	2007 UP_{1}	—	October 16, 2007	Bisei SG Center	BATTeRS	·	1.4 km	MPC · JPL
305044	2007 UB_{8}	—	October 16, 2007	Catalina	CSS	·	1.5 km	MPC · JPL
305045	2007 UV_{12}	—	October 16, 2007	Mount Lemmon	Mount Lemmon Survey	NYS	1.6 km	MPC · JPL
305046	2007 UL_{16}	—	October 18, 2007	Mount Lemmon	Mount Lemmon Survey	NYS	1.5 km	MPC · JPL
305047	2007 UV_{21}	—	October 16, 2007	Kitt Peak	Spacewatch	·	2.1 km	MPC · JPL
305048	2007 UT_{23}	—	October 16, 2007	Kitt Peak	Spacewatch	·	1.5 km	MPC · JPL
305049	2007 UZ_{23}	—	October 16, 2007	Kitt Peak	Spacewatch	MIS	2.8 km	MPC · JPL
305050	2007 UT_{40}	—	October 16, 2007	Kitt Peak	Spacewatch	·	1.4 km	MPC · JPL
305051	2007 UB_{42}	—	October 16, 2007	Mount Lemmon	Mount Lemmon Survey	·	1.6 km	MPC · JPL
305052	2007 US_{42}	—	October 16, 2007	Kitt Peak	Spacewatch	·	1.5 km	MPC · JPL
305053	2007 US_{58}	—	October 30, 2007	Mount Lemmon	Mount Lemmon Survey	(5)	1.2 km	MPC · JPL
305054	2007 UY_{60}	—	October 30, 2007	Mount Lemmon	Mount Lemmon Survey	·	1.7 km	MPC · JPL
305055	2007 UD_{62}	—	October 30, 2007	Mount Lemmon	Mount Lemmon Survey	·	980 m	MPC · JPL
305056	2007 UD_{65}	—	October 30, 2007	Catalina	CSS	·	1.3 km	MPC · JPL
305057	2007 UL_{65}	—	October 31, 2007	Kitt Peak	Spacewatch	·	1.4 km	MPC · JPL
305058	2007 UP_{72}	—	October 31, 2007	Mount Lemmon	Mount Lemmon Survey	(5)	1.1 km	MPC · JPL
305059	2007 UL_{76}	—	October 31, 2007	Mount Lemmon	Mount Lemmon Survey	·	1.5 km	MPC · JPL
305060	2007 UY_{77}	—	October 30, 2007	Kitt Peak	Spacewatch	·	1.3 km	MPC · JPL
305061	2007 UA_{80}	—	October 31, 2007	Mount Lemmon	Mount Lemmon Survey	·	2.0 km	MPC · JPL
305062	2007 UA_{83}	—	October 30, 2007	Kitt Peak	Spacewatch	EUN	1.5 km	MPC · JPL
305063	2007 UQ_{83}	—	October 30, 2007	Kitt Peak	Spacewatch	·	2.2 km	MPC · JPL
305064	2007 UM_{85}	—	October 30, 2007	Kitt Peak	Spacewatch	·	2.1 km	MPC · JPL
305065	2007 UF_{86}	—	October 30, 2007	Kitt Peak	Spacewatch	·	2.6 km	MPC · JPL
305066	2007 UU_{96}	—	October 30, 2007	Kitt Peak	Spacewatch	·	1.3 km	MPC · JPL
305067	2007 UO_{98}	—	October 30, 2007	Kitt Peak	Spacewatch	·	1.0 km	MPC · JPL
305068	2007 UY_{99}	—	October 30, 2007	Kitt Peak	Spacewatch	·	1.4 km	MPC · JPL
305069	2007 UD_{100}	—	October 30, 2007	Kitt Peak	Spacewatch	·	2.3 km	MPC · JPL
305070	2007 UU_{100}	—	October 30, 2007	Kitt Peak	Spacewatch	(5)	1.4 km	MPC · JPL
305071	2007 UC_{102}	—	October 30, 2007	Kitt Peak	Spacewatch	·	1.7 km	MPC · JPL
305072	2007 UQ_{103}	—	October 30, 2007	Kitt Peak	Spacewatch	(5)	1.7 km	MPC · JPL
305073	2007 UJ_{104}	—	October 30, 2007	Kitt Peak	Spacewatch	(5)	1.9 km	MPC · JPL
305074	2007 UK_{104}	—	October 30, 2007	Kitt Peak	Spacewatch	MAR	1.7 km	MPC · JPL
305075	2007 US_{105}	—	October 30, 2007	Kitt Peak	Spacewatch	·	1.7 km	MPC · JPL
305076	2007 UZ_{106}	—	October 31, 2007	Mount Lemmon	Mount Lemmon Survey	·	2.2 km	MPC · JPL
305077	2007 UC_{109}	—	October 30, 2007	Kitt Peak	Spacewatch	MIS	2.7 km	MPC · JPL
305078	2007 UC_{111}	—	October 30, 2007	Mount Lemmon	Mount Lemmon Survey	EUN	1.3 km	MPC · JPL
305079	2007 UD_{116}	—	October 31, 2007	Kitt Peak	Spacewatch	HNS	1.6 km	MPC · JPL
305080	2007 US_{118}	—	October 30, 2007	Kitt Peak	Spacewatch	·	2.7 km	MPC · JPL
305081	2007 UT_{119}	—	October 30, 2007	Mount Lemmon	Mount Lemmon Survey	·	1.3 km	MPC · JPL
305082	2007 UV_{127}	—	October 21, 2007	Mount Lemmon	Mount Lemmon Survey	·	2.1 km	MPC · JPL
305083	2007 UA_{128}	—	October 16, 2007	Mount Lemmon	Mount Lemmon Survey	·	1.4 km	MPC · JPL
305084	2007 UJ_{129}	—	October 20, 2007	Mount Lemmon	Mount Lemmon Survey	·	1.6 km	MPC · JPL
305085	2007 UZ_{129}	—	October 16, 2007	Mount Lemmon	Mount Lemmon Survey	·	1.6 km	MPC · JPL
305086	2007 UL_{131}	—	October 16, 2007	Catalina	CSS	·	2.3 km	MPC · JPL
305087	2007 UC_{136}	—	October 21, 2007	Catalina	CSS	·	1.8 km	MPC · JPL
305088	2007 UV_{141}	—	October 21, 2007	Mount Lemmon	Mount Lemmon Survey	·	1.7 km	MPC · JPL
305089	2007 VO_{2}	—	November 2, 2007	Pla D'Arguines	R. Ferrando	·	1.9 km	MPC · JPL
305090	2007 VQ_{4}	—	November 3, 2007	Socorro	LINEAR	AMO +1km	2.1 km	MPC · JPL
305091	2007 VX_{11}	—	November 5, 2007	Catalina	CSS	·	2.4 km	MPC · JPL
305092	2007 VG_{12}	—	November 1, 2007	Mount Lemmon	Mount Lemmon Survey	MAS	920 m	MPC · JPL
305093	2007 VM_{14}	—	November 1, 2007	Mount Lemmon	Mount Lemmon Survey	·	1.0 km	MPC · JPL
305094	2007 VM_{15}	—	November 1, 2007	Kitt Peak	Spacewatch	·	1.7 km	MPC · JPL
305095	2007 VR_{30}	—	November 2, 2007	Kitt Peak	Spacewatch	WIT	1.1 km	MPC · JPL
305096	2007 VB_{37}	—	November 2, 2007	Catalina	CSS	EUN	1.4 km	MPC · JPL
305097	2007 VR_{42}	—	November 3, 2007	Mount Lemmon	Mount Lemmon Survey	·	2.7 km	MPC · JPL
305098	2007 VZ_{44}	—	November 1, 2007	Kitt Peak	Spacewatch	(5)	1.5 km	MPC · JPL
305099	2007 VE_{48}	—	November 1, 2007	Kitt Peak	Spacewatch	·	1.7 km	MPC · JPL
305100	2007 VJ_{49}	—	November 1, 2007	Kitt Peak	Spacewatch	·	2.0 km	MPC · JPL

== 305101–305200 ==
back to top

Designation			Discovery			Properties		Ref
Permanent	Provisional	Named after	Date	Site	Discoverer(s)	Category	Diam.	Ref
305101	2007 VS_{49}	—	November 1, 2007	Kitt Peak	Spacewatch	·	1.8 km	MPC · JPL
305102	2007 VQ_{55}	—	November 1, 2007	Kitt Peak	Spacewatch	·	1.5 km	MPC · JPL
305103	2007 VT_{55}	—	November 1, 2007	Kitt Peak	Spacewatch	·	1.6 km	MPC · JPL
305104	2007 VS_{57}	—	November 1, 2007	Kitt Peak	Spacewatch	·	1.6 km	MPC · JPL
305105	2007 VC_{59}	—	November 1, 2007	Kitt Peak	Spacewatch	·	1.5 km	MPC · JPL
305106	2007 VJ_{60}	—	November 1, 2007	Kitt Peak	Spacewatch	·	2.5 km	MPC · JPL
305107	2007 VP_{60}	—	November 1, 2007	Kitt Peak	Spacewatch	·	1.4 km	MPC · JPL
305108	2007 VZ_{60}	—	November 1, 2007	Kitt Peak	Spacewatch	·	1.3 km	MPC · JPL
305109	2007 VS_{61}	—	November 1, 2007	Kitt Peak	Spacewatch	·	1.5 km	MPC · JPL
305110	2007 VR_{72}	—	November 1, 2007	Kitt Peak	Spacewatch	·	2.3 km	MPC · JPL
305111	2007 VG_{75}	—	November 3, 2007	Kitt Peak	Spacewatch	KON	3.0 km	MPC · JPL
305112	2007 VF_{77}	—	November 3, 2007	Kitt Peak	Spacewatch	·	1.5 km	MPC · JPL
305113	2007 VK_{83}	—	November 4, 2007	Mount Lemmon	Mount Lemmon Survey	·	2.2 km	MPC · JPL
305114	2007 VM_{88}	—	November 2, 2007	Socorro	LINEAR	·	3.2 km	MPC · JPL
305115	2007 VG_{90}	—	November 4, 2007	Socorro	LINEAR	·	2.2 km	MPC · JPL
305116	2007 VQ_{90}	—	November 5, 2007	Socorro	LINEAR	(5)	1.3 km	MPC · JPL
305117	2007 VY_{93}	—	November 6, 2007	Needville	J. Dellinger, P. G. A. Garossino	·	1.4 km	MPC · JPL
305118	2007 VH_{95}	—	November 8, 2007	Socorro	LINEAR	·	1.8 km	MPC · JPL
305119	2007 VC_{98}	—	November 1, 2007	Kitt Peak	Spacewatch	·	3.4 km	MPC · JPL
305120	2007 VK_{98}	—	November 2, 2007	Kitt Peak	Spacewatch	·	1.1 km	MPC · JPL
305121	2007 VZ_{99}	—	November 2, 2007	Kitt Peak	Spacewatch	·	2.0 km	MPC · JPL
305122	2007 VQ_{114}	—	November 3, 2007	Kitt Peak	Spacewatch	·	2.5 km	MPC · JPL
305123	2007 VP_{116}	—	November 3, 2007	Kitt Peak	Spacewatch	EUN	2.0 km	MPC · JPL
305124	2007 VB_{117}	—	November 3, 2007	Kitt Peak	Spacewatch	·	1.6 km	MPC · JPL
305125	2007 VT_{121}	—	November 5, 2007	Kitt Peak	Spacewatch	EUN	1.4 km	MPC · JPL
305126	2007 VU_{135}	—	November 3, 2007	Mount Lemmon	Mount Lemmon Survey	·	1.7 km	MPC · JPL
305127	2007 VY_{139}	—	November 3, 2007	Kitt Peak	Spacewatch	·	2.0 km	MPC · JPL
305128	2007 VU_{141}	—	November 4, 2007	Kitt Peak	Spacewatch	·	1.6 km	MPC · JPL
305129	2007 VQ_{143}	—	November 4, 2007	Kitt Peak	Spacewatch	·	1.3 km	MPC · JPL
305130	2007 VG_{144}	—	November 4, 2007	Kitt Peak	Spacewatch	·	1.9 km	MPC · JPL
305131	2007 VX_{145}	—	November 4, 2007	Kitt Peak	Spacewatch	·	2.0 km	MPC · JPL
305132	2007 VK_{147}	—	November 4, 2007	Kitt Peak	Spacewatch	(17392)	1.6 km	MPC · JPL
305133	2007 VJ_{148}	—	November 4, 2007	Kitt Peak	Spacewatch	·	2.4 km	MPC · JPL
305134	2007 VV_{152}	—	November 2, 2007	Kitt Peak	Spacewatch	·	1.8 km	MPC · JPL
305135	2007 VB_{155}	—	November 5, 2007	Kitt Peak	Spacewatch	·	1.6 km	MPC · JPL
305136	2007 VO_{155}	—	November 5, 2007	Kitt Peak	Spacewatch	·	1.9 km	MPC · JPL
305137	2007 VE_{156}	—	March 4, 1997	Kitt Peak	Spacewatch	·	1.9 km	MPC · JPL
305138	2007 VY_{157}	—	November 5, 2007	Kitt Peak	Spacewatch	·	2.2 km	MPC · JPL
305139	2007 VD_{164}	—	November 5, 2007	Kitt Peak	Spacewatch	·	1.1 km	MPC · JPL
305140	2007 VO_{168}	—	November 5, 2007	Kitt Peak	Spacewatch	(194)	1.7 km	MPC · JPL
305141	2007 VV_{168}	—	November 5, 2007	Kitt Peak	Spacewatch	·	1.2 km	MPC · JPL
305142	2007 VY_{171}	—	November 7, 2007	Kitt Peak	Spacewatch	V	760 m	MPC · JPL
305143	2007 VE_{173}	—	November 2, 2007	Mount Lemmon	Mount Lemmon Survey	(5)	1.5 km	MPC · JPL
305144	2007 VN_{176}	—	November 5, 2007	Mount Lemmon	Mount Lemmon Survey	·	1.2 km	MPC · JPL
305145	2007 VS_{177}	—	November 6, 2007	Purple Mountain	PMO NEO Survey Program	MAR	1.3 km	MPC · JPL
305146	2007 VT_{186}	—	November 12, 2007	Bisei SG Center	BATTeRS	MAR	1.5 km	MPC · JPL
305147	2007 VU_{191}	—	November 4, 2007	Mount Lemmon	Mount Lemmon Survey	·	2.5 km	MPC · JPL
305148	2007 VC_{195}	—	November 7, 2007	Mount Lemmon	Mount Lemmon Survey	·	1.2 km	MPC · JPL
305149	2007 VH_{198}	—	November 8, 2007	Mount Lemmon	Mount Lemmon Survey	·	1.8 km	MPC · JPL
305150	2007 VM_{202}	—	November 6, 2007	Mount Lemmon	Mount Lemmon Survey	·	2.3 km	MPC · JPL
305151	2007 VR_{209}	—	November 7, 2007	Kitt Peak	Spacewatch	(5)	1.4 km	MPC · JPL
305152	2007 VS_{209}	—	November 7, 2007	Kitt Peak	Spacewatch	·	1.2 km	MPC · JPL
305153	2007 VM_{210}	—	November 9, 2007	Kitt Peak	Spacewatch	·	1.3 km	MPC · JPL
305154	2007 VY_{213}	—	November 9, 2007	Kitt Peak	Spacewatch	·	2.7 km	MPC · JPL
305155	2007 VS_{214}	—	November 9, 2007	Kitt Peak	Spacewatch	·	1.4 km	MPC · JPL
305156	2007 VK_{217}	—	November 9, 2007	Kitt Peak	Spacewatch	·	1.4 km	MPC · JPL
305157	2007 VC_{219}	—	November 9, 2007	Kitt Peak	Spacewatch	·	4.2 km	MPC · JPL
305158	2007 VQ_{220}	—	November 9, 2007	Kitt Peak	Spacewatch	·	2.3 km	MPC · JPL
305159	2007 VJ_{221}	—	November 12, 2007	Mount Lemmon	Mount Lemmon Survey	·	1.3 km	MPC · JPL
305160	2007 VP_{221}	—	November 14, 2007	Bisei SG Center	BATTeRS	·	1.1 km	MPC · JPL
305161	2007 VA_{222}	—	November 6, 2007	Purple Mountain	PMO NEO Survey Program	·	2.0 km	MPC · JPL
305162	2007 VM_{227}	—	November 12, 2007	Catalina	CSS	·	1.4 km	MPC · JPL
305163	2007 VB_{235}	—	November 9, 2007	Kitt Peak	Spacewatch	(12739)	1.6 km	MPC · JPL
305164	2007 VY_{238}	—	November 13, 2007	Kitt Peak	Spacewatch	·	2.5 km	MPC · JPL
305165	2007 VP_{248}	—	November 13, 2007	Catalina	CSS	EUN	1.7 km	MPC · JPL
305166	2007 VF_{260}	—	November 15, 2007	Anderson Mesa	LONEOS	(5)	1.9 km	MPC · JPL
305167	2007 VL_{264}	—	November 13, 2007	Kitt Peak	Spacewatch	·	2.0 km	MPC · JPL
305168	2007 VQ_{266}	—	November 14, 2007	Kitt Peak	Spacewatch	·	1.6 km	MPC · JPL
305169	2007 VP_{269}	—	November 14, 2007	Socorro	LINEAR	·	1.5 km	MPC · JPL
305170	2007 VW_{276}	—	November 14, 2007	Kitt Peak	Spacewatch	(5)	1.6 km	MPC · JPL
305171	2007 VX_{277}	—	November 14, 2007	Kitt Peak	Spacewatch	·	1.1 km	MPC · JPL
305172	2007 VQ_{280}	—	November 14, 2007	Kitt Peak	Spacewatch	·	990 m	MPC · JPL
305173	2007 VZ_{281}	—	November 14, 2007	Kitt Peak	Spacewatch	·	1.6 km	MPC · JPL
305174	2007 VF_{284}	—	November 14, 2007	Kitt Peak	Spacewatch	·	1.6 km	MPC · JPL
305175	2007 VH_{286}	—	November 14, 2007	Kitt Peak	Spacewatch	·	1.5 km	MPC · JPL
305176	2007 VA_{292}	—	November 14, 2007	Kitt Peak	Spacewatch	·	2.5 km	MPC · JPL
305177	2007 VL_{292}	—	November 14, 2007	Kitt Peak	Spacewatch	·	2.6 km	MPC · JPL
305178	2007 VY_{294}	—	July 16, 2002	Palomar	NEAT	·	2.0 km	MPC · JPL
305179	2007 VW_{295}	—	November 14, 2007	Mount Lemmon	Mount Lemmon Survey	KON	2.8 km	MPC · JPL
305180	2007 VA_{299}	—	November 11, 2007	Catalina	CSS	·	1.6 km	MPC · JPL
305181 Donelaitis	2007 VR_{302}	Donelaitis	November 5, 2007	Moletai	K. Černis	KON	3.6 km	MPC · JPL
305182	2007 VZ_{306}	—	November 2, 2007	Mount Lemmon	Mount Lemmon Survey	·	2.6 km	MPC · JPL
305183	2007 VA_{307}	—	November 2, 2007	Mount Lemmon	Mount Lemmon Survey	·	1.7 km	MPC · JPL
305184	2007 VV_{308}	—	November 8, 2007	Kitt Peak	Spacewatch	·	2.0 km	MPC · JPL
305185	2007 VM_{309}	—	November 14, 2007	Kitt Peak	Spacewatch	PAD	2.2 km	MPC · JPL
305186	2007 VW_{312}	—	November 3, 2007	Mount Lemmon	Mount Lemmon Survey	·	3.7 km	MPC · JPL
305187	2007 VV_{314}	—	November 2, 2007	Kitt Peak	Spacewatch	NEM	2.7 km	MPC · JPL
305188	2007 VQ_{315}	—	November 7, 2007	Kitt Peak	Spacewatch	·	1.2 km	MPC · JPL
305189	2007 VM_{319}	—	November 5, 2007	Mount Lemmon	Mount Lemmon Survey	KOR	1.9 km	MPC · JPL
305190	2007 VS_{323}	—	November 4, 2007	Socorro	LINEAR	·	2.4 km	MPC · JPL
305191	2007 VV_{323}	—	November 4, 2007	Socorro	LINEAR	·	2.0 km	MPC · JPL
305192	2007 VC_{324}	—	November 5, 2007	Socorro	LINEAR	(5)	1.4 km	MPC · JPL
305193	2007 VS_{325}	—	November 2, 2007	Kitt Peak	Spacewatch	·	1.5 km	MPC · JPL
305194	2007 VT_{325}	—	November 2, 2007	Socorro	LINEAR	·	2.8 km	MPC · JPL
305195	2007 VF_{326}	—	November 3, 2007	Kitt Peak	Spacewatch	·	1.5 km	MPC · JPL
305196	2007 VM_{326}	—	November 4, 2007	Socorro	LINEAR	EUN	1.4 km	MPC · JPL
305197	2007 VW_{328}	—	November 9, 2007	Kitt Peak	Spacewatch	·	1.2 km	MPC · JPL
305198	2007 VF_{331}	—	November 5, 2007	Mount Lemmon	Mount Lemmon Survey	·	2.3 km	MPC · JPL
305199	2007 VS_{333}	—	November 11, 2007	Mount Lemmon	Mount Lemmon Survey	·	2.3 km	MPC · JPL
305200	2007 VY_{334}	—	November 14, 2007	Mount Lemmon	Mount Lemmon Survey	·	2.1 km	MPC · JPL

== 305201–305300 ==
back to top

Designation			Discovery			Properties		Ref
Permanent	Provisional	Named after	Date	Site	Discoverer(s)	Category	Diam.	Ref
305201	2007 WY	—	November 16, 2007	Dauban	Chante-Perdrix	·	1.3 km	MPC · JPL
305202	2007 WC_{4}	—	November 17, 2007	Costitx	OAM	·	1.3 km	MPC · JPL
305203	2007 WN_{7}	—	November 18, 2007	Socorro	LINEAR	EUN	1.6 km	MPC · JPL
305204	2007 WN_{11}	—	November 17, 2007	Catalina	CSS	·	2.3 km	MPC · JPL
305205	2007 WU_{14}	—	November 18, 2007	Mount Lemmon	Mount Lemmon Survey	·	1.6 km	MPC · JPL
305206	2007 WX_{19}	—	November 18, 2007	Mount Lemmon	Mount Lemmon Survey	·	1.9 km	MPC · JPL
305207	2007 WS_{20}	—	November 18, 2007	Mount Lemmon	Mount Lemmon Survey	EOS	2.3 km	MPC · JPL
305208	2007 WM_{24}	—	November 18, 2007	Mount Lemmon	Mount Lemmon Survey	·	1.3 km	MPC · JPL
305209	2007 WC_{26}	—	November 18, 2007	Mount Lemmon	Mount Lemmon Survey	·	1.4 km	MPC · JPL
305210	2007 WZ_{28}	—	November 19, 2007	Kitt Peak	Spacewatch	·	2.2 km	MPC · JPL
305211	2007 WJ_{29}	—	November 19, 2007	Kitt Peak	Spacewatch	·	1.9 km	MPC · JPL
305212	2007 WS_{39}	—	November 17, 2007	Catalina	CSS	·	2.6 km	MPC · JPL
305213	2007 WV_{47}	—	November 20, 2007	Mount Lemmon	Mount Lemmon Survey	·	1.9 km	MPC · JPL
305214	2007 WR_{48}	—	November 20, 2007	Mount Lemmon	Mount Lemmon Survey	·	2.1 km	MPC · JPL
305215	2007 WP_{55}	—	November 28, 2007	Purple Mountain	PMO NEO Survey Program	·	2.8 km	MPC · JPL
305216	2007 WA_{58}	—	November 19, 2007	Mount Lemmon	Mount Lemmon Survey	·	1.8 km	MPC · JPL
305217	2007 WK_{58}	—	November 16, 2007	Mount Lemmon	Mount Lemmon Survey	·	1.3 km	MPC · JPL
305218	2007 WF_{59}	—	November 19, 2007	Kitt Peak	Spacewatch	·	2.2 km	MPC · JPL
305219	2007 WM_{59}	—	November 19, 2007	Mount Lemmon	Mount Lemmon Survey	EOS	2.3 km	MPC · JPL
305220	2007 WG_{62}	—	April 13, 2005	Catalina	CSS	·	2.2 km	MPC · JPL
305221	2007 XZ	—	December 1, 2007	Pla D'Arguines	R. Ferrando	·	1.6 km	MPC · JPL
305222	2007 XE_{3}	—	December 3, 2007	Catalina	CSS	·	1.6 km	MPC · JPL
305223	2007 XJ_{3}	—	December 3, 2007	Calvin-Rehoboth	Calvin College	·	1.4 km	MPC · JPL
305224	2007 XC_{9}	—	December 4, 2007	Mount Lemmon	Mount Lemmon Survey	·	3.0 km	MPC · JPL
305225	2007 XB_{11}	—	December 3, 2007	Goodricke-Pigott	R. A. Tucker	·	1.7 km	MPC · JPL
305226	2007 XD_{13}	—	December 4, 2007	Kitt Peak	Spacewatch	·	2.3 km	MPC · JPL
305227	2007 XZ_{13}	—	December 5, 2007	Kitt Peak	Spacewatch	·	1.8 km	MPC · JPL
305228	2007 XF_{14}	—	December 5, 2007	Catalina	CSS	NEM	2.4 km	MPC · JPL
305229	2007 XK_{15}	—	December 7, 2007	Bisei SG Center	BATTeRS	·	3.0 km	MPC · JPL
305230	2007 XP_{18}	—	December 12, 2007	Costitx	OAM	·	1.8 km	MPC · JPL
305231	2007 XR_{18}	—	December 13, 2007	Costitx	OAM	·	2.8 km	MPC · JPL
305232	2007 XK_{19}	—	December 12, 2007	Socorro	LINEAR	·	1.3 km	MPC · JPL
305233	2007 XX_{19}	—	December 12, 2007	Socorro	LINEAR	·	2.5 km	MPC · JPL
305234	2007 XA_{20}	—	December 12, 2007	La Sagra	OAM	·	2.3 km	MPC · JPL
305235	2007 XC_{20}	—	December 4, 2007	Catalina	CSS	·	3.3 km	MPC · JPL
305236	2007 XY_{24}	—	December 14, 2007	La Sagra	OAM	·	2.2 km	MPC · JPL
305237	2007 XG_{25}	—	November 9, 2007	Kitt Peak	Spacewatch	·	1.3 km	MPC · JPL
305238 Maxuehui	2007 XZ_{25}	Maxuehui	December 15, 2007	Lulin	Cheng, Y.-C.	AGN	1.4 km	MPC · JPL
305239	2007 XY_{29}	—	December 15, 2007	Catalina	CSS	·	2.1 km	MPC · JPL
305240	2007 XE_{31}	—	December 15, 2007	Kitt Peak	Spacewatch	(13314)	1.5 km	MPC · JPL
305241	2007 XO_{31}	—	December 15, 2007	Mount Lemmon	Mount Lemmon Survey	·	1.6 km	MPC · JPL
305242	2007 XV_{32}	—	December 15, 2007	Catalina	CSS	·	2.5 km	MPC · JPL
305243	2007 XC_{34}	—	December 10, 2007	Socorro	LINEAR	·	1.9 km	MPC · JPL
305244	2007 XS_{35}	—	December 13, 2007	Socorro	LINEAR	·	2.2 km	MPC · JPL
305245	2007 XO_{37}	—	December 13, 2007	Socorro	LINEAR	·	2.4 km	MPC · JPL
305246	2007 XD_{39}	—	December 13, 2007	Socorro	LINEAR	·	3.0 km	MPC · JPL
305247	2007 XS_{40}	—	December 13, 2007	Socorro	LINEAR	·	3.0 km	MPC · JPL
305248	2007 XP_{42}	—	December 14, 2007	Purple Mountain	PMO NEO Survey Program	·	2.5 km	MPC · JPL
305249	2007 XR_{44}	—	December 15, 2007	Kitt Peak	Spacewatch	ADE	3.0 km	MPC · JPL
305250	2007 XP_{48}	—	December 15, 2007	Kitt Peak	Spacewatch	·	1.8 km	MPC · JPL
305251	2007 XQ_{48}	—	December 15, 2007	Kitt Peak	Spacewatch	·	2.2 km	MPC · JPL
305252	2007 XE_{55}	—	December 15, 2007	Mount Lemmon	Mount Lemmon Survey	·	1.8 km	MPC · JPL
305253	2007 XM_{55}	—	December 4, 2007	Kitt Peak	Spacewatch	·	2.8 km	MPC · JPL
305254 Moron	2007 YN_{3}	Moron	December 19, 2007	Nogales	M. Ory	AGN	1.4 km	MPC · JPL
305255	2007 YP_{8}	—	December 16, 2007	Mount Lemmon	Mount Lemmon Survey	·	1.7 km	MPC · JPL
305256	2007 YN_{9}	—	December 16, 2007	Mount Lemmon	Mount Lemmon Survey	·	2.1 km	MPC · JPL
305257	2007 YE_{10}	—	December 16, 2007	Kitt Peak	Spacewatch	EOS	2.7 km	MPC · JPL
305258	2007 YM_{12}	—	December 17, 2007	Mount Lemmon	Mount Lemmon Survey	·	2.2 km	MPC · JPL
305259	2007 YP_{14}	—	December 17, 2007	Mount Lemmon	Mount Lemmon Survey	·	2.9 km	MPC · JPL
305260	2007 YR_{22}	—	December 16, 2007	Kitt Peak	Spacewatch	NEM	2.8 km	MPC · JPL
305261	2007 YO_{23}	—	September 15, 2006	Kitt Peak	Spacewatch	KOR	1.5 km	MPC · JPL
305262	2007 YO_{24}	—	December 17, 2007	Mount Lemmon	Mount Lemmon Survey	·	2.6 km	MPC · JPL
305263 Krasznahorkai	2007 YQ_{29}	Krasznahorkai	December 21, 2007	Piszkéstető	K. Sárneczky	·	2.0 km	MPC · JPL
305264 Tarrbéla	2007 YR_{29}	Tarrbéla	December 21, 2007	Piszkéstető	K. Sárneczky	·	4.5 km	MPC · JPL
305265	2007 YZ_{32}	—	December 28, 2007	Kitt Peak	Spacewatch	·	1.5 km	MPC · JPL
305266	2007 YO_{33}	—	December 28, 2007	Kitt Peak	Spacewatch	·	2.5 km	MPC · JPL
305267	2007 YO_{36}	—	December 30, 2007	Mount Lemmon	Mount Lemmon Survey	·	2.2 km	MPC · JPL
305268	2007 YQ_{37}	—	December 30, 2007	Mount Lemmon	Mount Lemmon Survey	·	2.3 km	MPC · JPL
305269	2007 YY_{43}	—	December 30, 2007	Kitt Peak	Spacewatch	·	2.7 km	MPC · JPL
305270	2007 YK_{44}	—	December 30, 2007	Kitt Peak	Spacewatch	·	1.8 km	MPC · JPL
305271	2007 YC_{48}	—	December 28, 2007	Kitt Peak	Spacewatch	·	1.7 km	MPC · JPL
305272	2007 YJ_{48}	—	December 28, 2007	Kitt Peak	Spacewatch	·	2.0 km	MPC · JPL
305273	2007 YZ_{50}	—	December 28, 2007	Kitt Peak	Spacewatch	·	2.5 km	MPC · JPL
305274	2007 YW_{52}	—	December 30, 2007	Catalina	CSS	·	2.1 km	MPC · JPL
305275	2007 YD_{56}	—	December 29, 2007	Lulin	LUSS	·	2.5 km	MPC · JPL
305276	2007 YS_{58}	—	March 16, 2004	Kitt Peak	Spacewatch	·	2.4 km	MPC · JPL
305277	2007 YK_{60}	—	December 30, 2007	Catalina	CSS	·	2.0 km	MPC · JPL
305278	2007 YE_{62}	—	December 28, 2007	Kitt Peak	Spacewatch	HOF	4.1 km	MPC · JPL
305279	2007 YB_{63}	—	December 31, 2007	Kitt Peak	Spacewatch	·	1.8 km	MPC · JPL
305280	2007 YH_{63}	—	December 31, 2007	Kitt Peak	Spacewatch	EOS	2.3 km	MPC · JPL
305281	2007 YR_{65}	—	December 18, 2007	Mount Lemmon	Mount Lemmon Survey	·	3.0 km	MPC · JPL
305282	2007 YG_{67}	—	December 16, 2007	Kitt Peak	Spacewatch	NEM	2.5 km	MPC · JPL
305283	2007 YC_{68}	—	December 30, 2007	Kitt Peak	Spacewatch	KOR	1.5 km	MPC · JPL
305284	2007 YW_{68}	—	December 16, 2007	Mount Lemmon	Mount Lemmon Survey	·	1.5 km	MPC · JPL
305285	2008 AJ	—	January 1, 2008	Kitt Peak	Spacewatch	·	2.4 km	MPC · JPL
305286	2008 AD_{1}	—	January 1, 2008	Bergisch Gladbach	W. Bickel	·	2.0 km	MPC · JPL
305287 Olegyankov	2008 AF_{2}	Olegyankov	January 6, 2008	Zelenchukskaya Stn	Korotkiy, S., T. V. Krjačko	·	2.5 km	MPC · JPL
305288	2008 AT_{2}	—	January 5, 2008	Purple Mountain	PMO NEO Survey Program	·	2.2 km	MPC · JPL
305289	2008 AB_{4}	—	January 8, 2008	Dauban	Kugel, F.	·	2.7 km	MPC · JPL
305290	2008 AT_{4}	—	January 5, 2008	Purple Mountain	PMO NEO Survey Program	·	1.3 km	MPC · JPL
305291	2008 AH_{5}	—	January 9, 2008	Lulin	LUSS	·	4.2 km	MPC · JPL
305292	2008 AS_{5}	—	January 10, 2008	Mount Lemmon	Mount Lemmon Survey	·	1.0 km	MPC · JPL
305293	2008 AY_{7}	—	January 10, 2008	Kitt Peak	Spacewatch	MIS	3.0 km	MPC · JPL
305294	2008 AA_{8}	—	January 10, 2008	Kitt Peak	Spacewatch	·	2.0 km	MPC · JPL
305295	2008 AH_{9}	—	January 10, 2008	Mount Lemmon	Mount Lemmon Survey	·	1.4 km	MPC · JPL
305296	2008 AA_{11}	—	January 10, 2008	Mount Lemmon	Mount Lemmon Survey	·	2.2 km	MPC · JPL
305297	2008 AX_{13}	—	January 10, 2008	Mount Lemmon	Mount Lemmon Survey	·	3.2 km	MPC · JPL
305298	2008 AB_{15}	—	January 10, 2008	Kitt Peak	Spacewatch	AGN	1.5 km	MPC · JPL
305299	2008 AG_{20}	—	January 10, 2008	Mount Lemmon	Mount Lemmon Survey	·	3.7 km	MPC · JPL
305300	2008 AH_{22}	—	January 10, 2008	Mount Lemmon	Mount Lemmon Survey	EOS	2.4 km	MPC · JPL

== 305301–305400 ==
back to top

Designation			Discovery			Properties		Ref
Permanent	Provisional	Named after	Date	Site	Discoverer(s)	Category	Diam.	Ref
305301	2008 AY_{24}	—	January 10, 2008	Mount Lemmon	Mount Lemmon Survey	KOR	1.2 km	MPC · JPL
305302	2008 AV_{26}	—	January 10, 2008	Kitt Peak	Spacewatch	EOS	2.5 km	MPC · JPL
305303	2008 AC_{31}	—	January 12, 2008	Kanab	Sheridan, E.	GEF	1.3 km	MPC · JPL
305304	2008 AO_{34}	—	January 10, 2008	Kitt Peak	Spacewatch	EOS	2.4 km	MPC · JPL
305305	2008 AE_{36}	—	January 10, 2008	Kitt Peak	Spacewatch	·	2.4 km	MPC · JPL
305306	2008 AO_{36}	—	January 10, 2008	Kitt Peak	Spacewatch	·	2.2 km	MPC · JPL
305307	2008 AN_{37}	—	January 10, 2008	Kitt Peak	Spacewatch	·	2.7 km	MPC · JPL
305308	2008 AK_{38}	—	January 10, 2008	Mount Lemmon	Mount Lemmon Survey	·	2.1 km	MPC · JPL
305309	2008 AP_{40}	—	January 10, 2008	Mount Lemmon	Mount Lemmon Survey	·	2.5 km	MPC · JPL
305310	2008 AW_{40}	—	January 10, 2008	Mount Lemmon	Mount Lemmon Survey	LIX	5.0 km	MPC · JPL
305311	2008 AX_{42}	—	January 10, 2008	Catalina	CSS	·	1.2 km	MPC · JPL
305312	2008 AL_{43}	—	January 10, 2008	Kitt Peak	Spacewatch	·	4.7 km	MPC · JPL
305313	2008 AU_{44}	—	January 10, 2008	Kitt Peak	Spacewatch	·	3.1 km	MPC · JPL
305314	2008 AG_{45}	—	January 10, 2008	Lulin	LUSS	·	2.2 km	MPC · JPL
305315	2008 AH_{45}	—	January 10, 2008	Lulin	LUSS	·	1.5 km	MPC · JPL
305316	2008 AR_{50}	—	January 11, 2008	Kitt Peak	Spacewatch	·	2.4 km	MPC · JPL
305317	2008 AH_{53}	—	January 11, 2008	Kitt Peak	Spacewatch	·	2.6 km	MPC · JPL
305318	2008 AU_{54}	—	January 11, 2008	Kitt Peak	Spacewatch	·	3.8 km	MPC · JPL
305319	2008 AQ_{64}	—	January 11, 2008	Mount Lemmon	Mount Lemmon Survey	·	3.0 km	MPC · JPL
305320	2008 AW_{66}	—	January 11, 2008	Kitt Peak	Spacewatch	AGN	1.5 km	MPC · JPL
305321	2008 AJ_{67}	—	January 11, 2008	Kitt Peak	Spacewatch	AGN	1.7 km	MPC · JPL
305322	2008 AB_{76}	—	January 11, 2008	Catalina	CSS	·	2.1 km	MPC · JPL
305323	2008 AA_{77}	—	January 12, 2008	Kitt Peak	Spacewatch	·	2.4 km	MPC · JPL
305324	2008 AP_{81}	—	January 13, 2008	Mount Lemmon	Mount Lemmon Survey	PAD	1.9 km	MPC · JPL
305325	2008 AX_{84}	—	September 25, 2006	Kitt Peak	Spacewatch	·	2.3 km	MPC · JPL
305326	2008 AU_{86}	—	January 11, 2008	Catalina	CSS	·	2.5 km	MPC · JPL
305327	2008 AY_{87}	—	January 13, 2008	Kitt Peak	Spacewatch	·	2.1 km	MPC · JPL
305328	2008 AT_{93}	—	January 14, 2008	Kitt Peak	Spacewatch	NEM	2.5 km	MPC · JPL
305329	2008 AY_{94}	—	January 14, 2008	Kitt Peak	Spacewatch	·	2.1 km	MPC · JPL
305330	2008 AB_{95}	—	October 19, 2006	Catalina	CSS	EOS	2.0 km	MPC · JPL
305331	2008 AM_{95}	—	January 14, 2008	Kitt Peak	Spacewatch	·	2.3 km	MPC · JPL
305332	2008 AU_{97}	—	January 14, 2008	Kitt Peak	Spacewatch	EOS	2.2 km	MPC · JPL
305333	2008 AD_{105}	—	January 15, 2008	Mount Lemmon	Mount Lemmon Survey	·	2.4 km	MPC · JPL
305334	2008 AF_{106}	—	January 15, 2008	Mount Lemmon	Mount Lemmon Survey	·	1.6 km	MPC · JPL
305335	2008 AY_{106}	—	January 15, 2008	Kitt Peak	Spacewatch	·	3.4 km	MPC · JPL
305336	2008 AL_{107}	—	January 15, 2008	Kitt Peak	Spacewatch	·	3.8 km	MPC · JPL
305337	2008 AM_{107}	—	January 15, 2008	Kitt Peak	Spacewatch	·	2.4 km	MPC · JPL
305338	2008 AB_{111}	—	January 15, 2008	Kitt Peak	Spacewatch	·	3.9 km	MPC · JPL
305339	2008 AV_{111}	—	January 15, 2008	Kitt Peak	Spacewatch	·	3.4 km	MPC · JPL
305340	2008 AM_{115}	—	January 15, 2008	Mount Lemmon	Mount Lemmon Survey	·	2.1 km	MPC · JPL
305341	2008 AT_{115}	—	January 11, 2008	Kitt Peak	Spacewatch	·	3.4 km	MPC · JPL
305342	2008 AH_{116}	—	January 11, 2008	Mount Lemmon	Mount Lemmon Survey	·	3.5 km	MPC · JPL
305343	2008 AX_{116}	—	January 11, 2008	Catalina	CSS	EUP	4.8 km	MPC · JPL
305344 Williamcolgrove	2008 AB_{122}	Williamcolgrove	January 6, 2008	Mauna Kea	P. A. Wiegert	·	3.0 km	MPC · JPL
305345	2008 AS_{129}	—	January 10, 2008	Mount Lemmon	Mount Lemmon Survey	·	2.6 km	MPC · JPL
305346	2008 AP_{134}	—	January 5, 2008	Bisei SG Center	BATTeRS	·	3.0 km	MPC · JPL
305347	2008 AV_{135}	—	January 11, 2008	Socorro	LINEAR	EOS	2.4 km	MPC · JPL
305348	2008 AE_{136}	—	January 12, 2008	Catalina	CSS	GEF	1.5 km	MPC · JPL
305349	2008 BG_{7}	—	January 16, 2008	Kitt Peak	Spacewatch	GEF	1.3 km	MPC · JPL
305350	2008 BC_{9}	—	January 16, 2008	Mount Lemmon	Mount Lemmon Survey	·	4.7 km	MPC · JPL
305351	2008 BW_{12}	—	January 18, 2008	Kitt Peak	Spacewatch	·	4.0 km	MPC · JPL
305352	2008 BZ_{12}	—	January 18, 2008	Kitt Peak	Spacewatch	THM	2.4 km	MPC · JPL
305353	2008 BM_{13}	—	January 19, 2008	Mount Lemmon	Mount Lemmon Survey	·	2.2 km	MPC · JPL
305354	2008 BK_{14}	—	January 20, 2008	Mount Lemmon	Mount Lemmon Survey	GEF ·	4.2 km	MPC · JPL
305355	2008 BU_{18}	—	January 29, 2008	La Sagra	OAM	AGN	1.6 km	MPC · JPL
305356	2008 BB_{23}	—	January 31, 2008	Mount Lemmon	Mount Lemmon Survey	·	3.5 km	MPC · JPL
305357	2008 BA_{28}	—	January 30, 2008	Mount Lemmon	Mount Lemmon Survey	·	3.8 km	MPC · JPL
305358	2008 BX_{28}	—	January 30, 2008	Catalina	CSS	·	1.9 km	MPC · JPL
305359	2008 BW_{32}	—	January 30, 2008	Kitt Peak	Spacewatch	·	3.0 km	MPC · JPL
305360	2008 BQ_{34}	—	January 30, 2008	Kitt Peak	Spacewatch	·	2.7 km	MPC · JPL
305361	2008 BB_{35}	—	January 30, 2008	Mount Lemmon	Mount Lemmon Survey	·	2.2 km	MPC · JPL
305362	2008 BH_{35}	—	January 30, 2008	Mount Lemmon	Mount Lemmon Survey	EOS	1.7 km	MPC · JPL
305363	2008 BO_{40}	—	January 31, 2008	Socorro	LINEAR	·	2.9 km	MPC · JPL
305364	2008 BG_{41}	—	January 30, 2008	Mount Lemmon	Mount Lemmon Survey	·	2.9 km	MPC · JPL
305365	2008 BA_{47}	—	January 31, 2008	Mount Lemmon	Mount Lemmon Survey	·	2.7 km	MPC · JPL
305366	2008 BD_{47}	—	January 31, 2008	Mount Lemmon	Mount Lemmon Survey	·	4.5 km	MPC · JPL
305367	2008 BL_{53}	—	January 20, 2008	Mount Lemmon	Mount Lemmon Survey	·	3.0 km	MPC · JPL
305368	2008 BB_{54}	—	January 31, 2008	Socorro	LINEAR	·	2.3 km	MPC · JPL
305369	2008 CY	—	February 2, 2008	Gaisberg	Gierlinger, R.	·	4.0 km	MPC · JPL
305370	2008 CQ_{3}	—	February 2, 2008	Kitt Peak	Spacewatch	·	3.7 km	MPC · JPL
305371	2008 CT_{4}	—	February 2, 2008	Kitt Peak	Spacewatch	·	6.0 km	MPC · JPL
305372	2008 CS_{10}	—	February 3, 2008	Catalina	CSS	·	2.2 km	MPC · JPL
305373	2008 CX_{10}	—	February 3, 2008	Kitt Peak	Spacewatch	·	3.4 km	MPC · JPL
305374	2008 CA_{11}	—	February 3, 2008	Kitt Peak	Spacewatch	·	2.3 km	MPC · JPL
305375	2008 CC_{11}	—	February 3, 2008	Kitt Peak	Spacewatch	DOR	2.7 km	MPC · JPL
305376	2008 CS_{11}	—	February 3, 2008	Kitt Peak	Spacewatch	·	2.3 km	MPC · JPL
305377	2008 CT_{13}	—	February 3, 2008	Kitt Peak	Spacewatch	·	3.7 km	MPC · JPL
305378	2008 CC_{15}	—	February 3, 2008	Kitt Peak	Spacewatch	·	2.6 km	MPC · JPL
305379	2008 CA_{18}	—	February 3, 2008	Kitt Peak	Spacewatch	·	3.6 km	MPC · JPL
305380	2008 CK_{24}	—	February 1, 2008	Kitt Peak	Spacewatch	·	3.0 km	MPC · JPL
305381	2008 CU_{29}	—	February 2, 2008	Kitt Peak	Spacewatch	ARM	4.0 km	MPC · JPL
305382	2008 CP_{36}	—	February 2, 2008	Kitt Peak	Spacewatch	·	3.8 km	MPC · JPL
305383	2008 CQ_{38}	—	February 2, 2008	Mount Lemmon	Mount Lemmon Survey	EOS	2.7 km	MPC · JPL
305384	2008 CO_{39}	—	September 18, 1995	Kitt Peak	Spacewatch	·	1.7 km	MPC · JPL
305385	2008 CT_{39}	—	February 2, 2008	Mount Lemmon	Mount Lemmon Survey	615	1.6 km	MPC · JPL
305386	2008 CF_{44}	—	February 2, 2008	Mount Lemmon	Mount Lemmon Survey	·	2.9 km	MPC · JPL
305387	2008 CX_{44}	—	February 2, 2008	Kitt Peak	Spacewatch	·	2.9 km	MPC · JPL
305388	2008 CL_{45}	—	August 27, 2005	Palomar	NEAT	HYG	3.4 km	MPC · JPL
305389	2008 CG_{50}	—	February 6, 2008	Catalina	CSS	EOS	2.6 km	MPC · JPL
305390	2008 CE_{54}	—	February 7, 2008	Catalina	CSS	EOS	2.3 km	MPC · JPL
305391	2008 CP_{57}	—	February 7, 2008	Mount Lemmon	Mount Lemmon Survey	·	2.9 km	MPC · JPL
305392	2008 CS_{57}	—	February 7, 2008	Mount Lemmon	Mount Lemmon Survey	·	2.2 km	MPC · JPL
305393	2008 CW_{59}	—	February 7, 2008	Kitt Peak	Spacewatch	·	4.2 km	MPC · JPL
305394	2008 CP_{63}	—	February 8, 2008	Mount Lemmon	Mount Lemmon Survey	·	2.9 km	MPC · JPL
305395	2008 CW_{64}	—	February 8, 2008	Mount Lemmon	Mount Lemmon Survey	·	3.0 km	MPC · JPL
305396	2008 CV_{67}	—	February 8, 2008	Mount Lemmon	Mount Lemmon Survey	(1298)	2.9 km	MPC · JPL
305397	2008 CB_{74}	—	February 9, 2008	Junk Bond	D. Healy	MRX	1.2 km	MPC · JPL
305398	2008 CD_{77}	—	February 6, 2008	Catalina	CSS	·	3.1 km	MPC · JPL
305399	2008 CG_{77}	—	February 6, 2008	Catalina	CSS	EOS	2.2 km	MPC · JPL
305400	2008 CV_{77}	—	February 6, 2008	Catalina	CSS	·	3.7 km	MPC · JPL

== 305401–305500 ==
back to top

Designation			Discovery			Properties		Ref
Permanent	Provisional	Named after	Date	Site	Discoverer(s)	Category	Diam.	Ref
305401	2008 CD_{80}	—	February 7, 2008	Kitt Peak	Spacewatch	ELF	3.7 km	MPC · JPL
305402	2008 CO_{82}	—	February 7, 2008	Mount Lemmon	Mount Lemmon Survey	·	2.3 km	MPC · JPL
305403	2008 CR_{84}	—	February 7, 2008	Mount Lemmon	Mount Lemmon Survey	·	2.3 km	MPC · JPL
305404	2008 CD_{85}	—	February 7, 2008	Kitt Peak	Spacewatch	·	3.4 km	MPC · JPL
305405	2008 CC_{86}	—	February 7, 2008	Mount Lemmon	Mount Lemmon Survey	·	2.7 km	MPC · JPL
305406	2008 CH_{91}	—	February 8, 2008	Kitt Peak	Spacewatch	·	3.9 km	MPC · JPL
305407	2008 CZ_{91}	—	February 8, 2008	Mount Lemmon	Mount Lemmon Survey	·	3.8 km	MPC · JPL
305408	2008 CF_{92}	—	February 8, 2008	Kitt Peak	Spacewatch	·	3.8 km	MPC · JPL
305409	2008 CV_{95}	—	February 8, 2008	Siding Spring	SSS	·	3.5 km	MPC · JPL
305410	2008 CX_{97}	—	February 9, 2008	Kitt Peak	Spacewatch	·	3.0 km	MPC · JPL
305411	2008 CS_{104}	—	February 9, 2008	Mount Lemmon	Mount Lemmon Survey	·	4.5 km	MPC · JPL
305412	2008 CP_{105}	—	February 9, 2008	Mount Lemmon	Mount Lemmon Survey	EOS	2.1 km	MPC · JPL
305413	2008 CR_{107}	—	October 20, 2006	Mount Lemmon	Mount Lemmon Survey	·	2.5 km	MPC · JPL
305414	2008 CG_{110}	—	February 9, 2008	Catalina	CSS	·	3.0 km	MPC · JPL
305415	2008 CX_{113}	—	February 10, 2008	Kitt Peak	Spacewatch	HYG	3.4 km	MPC · JPL
305416	2008 CV_{117}	—	February 11, 2008	Dauban	Kugel, F.	·	3.2 km	MPC · JPL
305417	2008 CS_{121}	—	February 7, 2008	Kitt Peak	Spacewatch	·	2.0 km	MPC · JPL
305418	2008 CE_{127}	—	February 8, 2008	Kitt Peak	Spacewatch	·	3.4 km	MPC · JPL
305419	2008 CH_{133}	—	February 8, 2008	Kitt Peak	Spacewatch	·	3.6 km	MPC · JPL
305420	2008 CP_{133}	—	February 8, 2008	Kitt Peak	Spacewatch	HYG	3.2 km	MPC · JPL
305421	2008 CS_{133}	—	February 8, 2008	Kitt Peak	Spacewatch	·	3.3 km	MPC · JPL
305422	2008 CF_{134}	—	February 8, 2008	Mount Lemmon	Mount Lemmon Survey	·	3.5 km	MPC · JPL
305423	2008 CJ_{134}	—	February 8, 2008	Mount Lemmon	Mount Lemmon Survey	HYG	3.4 km	MPC · JPL
305424	2008 CO_{138}	—	February 8, 2008	Kitt Peak	Spacewatch	·	2.9 km	MPC · JPL
305425	2008 CY_{138}	—	February 8, 2008	Kitt Peak	Spacewatch	·	2.4 km	MPC · JPL
305426	2008 CJ_{141}	—	February 8, 2008	Kitt Peak	Spacewatch	·	3.2 km	MPC · JPL
305427	2008 CR_{146}	—	February 9, 2008	Kitt Peak	Spacewatch	·	3.3 km	MPC · JPL
305428	2008 CU_{146}	—	February 9, 2008	Kitt Peak	Spacewatch	·	2.2 km	MPC · JPL
305429	2008 CT_{147}	—	February 9, 2008	Kitt Peak	Spacewatch	·	4.1 km	MPC · JPL
305430	2008 CS_{150}	—	February 9, 2008	Kitt Peak	Spacewatch	·	2.7 km	MPC · JPL
305431	2008 CB_{154}	—	February 9, 2008	Kitt Peak	Spacewatch	EUP	5.2 km	MPC · JPL
305432	2008 CK_{163}	—	February 10, 2008	Mount Lemmon	Mount Lemmon Survey	·	1.9 km	MPC · JPL
305433	2008 CM_{163}	—	February 10, 2008	Catalina	CSS	·	3.4 km	MPC · JPL
305434	2008 CP_{172}	—	February 13, 2008	Kitt Peak	Spacewatch	·	2.8 km	MPC · JPL
305435	2008 CJ_{174}	—	February 13, 2008	Mount Lemmon	Mount Lemmon Survey	VER	3.4 km	MPC · JPL
305436	2008 CJ_{175}	—	February 6, 2008	Socorro	LINEAR	·	2.7 km	MPC · JPL
305437	2008 CA_{178}	—	February 6, 2008	Catalina	CSS	·	2.3 km	MPC · JPL
305438	2008 CU_{180}	—	July 31, 2005	Palomar	NEAT	·	4.4 km	MPC · JPL
305439	2008 CH_{186}	—	February 2, 2008	Catalina	CSS	·	2.1 km	MPC · JPL
305440	2008 CU_{187}	—	February 3, 2008	Catalina	CSS	·	3.6 km	MPC · JPL
305441	2008 CD_{190}	—	February 2, 2008	Mount Lemmon	Mount Lemmon Survey	EUP	6.3 km	MPC · JPL
305442	2008 CQ_{192}	—	February 3, 2008	Kitt Peak	Spacewatch	·	2.1 km	MPC · JPL
305443	2008 CW_{192}	—	February 7, 2008	Kitt Peak	Spacewatch	KOR	1.5 km	MPC · JPL
305444	2008 CG_{194}	—	February 10, 2008	Mount Lemmon	Mount Lemmon Survey	THM	2.4 km	MPC · JPL
305445	2008 CM_{195}	—	February 1, 2008	Kitt Peak	Spacewatch	·	2.0 km	MPC · JPL
305446	2008 CP_{195}	—	February 2, 2008	Kitt Peak	Spacewatch	·	3.4 km	MPC · JPL
305447	2008 CP_{202}	—	February 8, 2008	Kitt Peak	Spacewatch	·	3.1 km	MPC · JPL
305448	2008 CC_{205}	—	February 2, 2008	Kitt Peak	Spacewatch	EMA	3.5 km	MPC · JPL
305449	2008 CL_{209}	—	October 27, 2006	Kitt Peak	Spacewatch	·	2.5 km	MPC · JPL
305450	2008 CL_{211}	—	February 3, 2008	Kitt Peak	Spacewatch	·	3.5 km	MPC · JPL
305451	2008 CH_{213}	—	February 9, 2008	Catalina	CSS	·	3.0 km	MPC · JPL
305452	2008 CD_{214}	—	February 11, 2008	Catalina	CSS	TIR	4.1 km	MPC · JPL
305453	2008 DC_{1}	—	February 24, 2008	Kitt Peak	Spacewatch	·	3.5 km	MPC · JPL
305454	2008 DP_{4}	—	February 27, 2008	Wildberg	R. Apitzsch	fast	2.7 km	MPC · JPL
305455	2008 DQ_{6}	—	February 24, 2008	Mount Lemmon	Mount Lemmon Survey	EOS	2.0 km	MPC · JPL
305456	2008 DU_{8}	—	February 25, 2008	Mount Lemmon	Mount Lemmon Survey	·	2.0 km	MPC · JPL
305457	2008 DC_{10}	—	February 26, 2008	Kitt Peak	Spacewatch	·	2.7 km	MPC · JPL
305458	2008 DA_{11}	—	February 26, 2008	Kitt Peak	Spacewatch	KOR	1.5 km	MPC · JPL
305459	2008 DU_{18}	—	February 27, 2008	Kitt Peak	Spacewatch	·	3.1 km	MPC · JPL
305460	2008 DD_{19}	—	February 27, 2008	Kitt Peak	Spacewatch	·	3.4 km	MPC · JPL
305461	2008 DT_{23}	—	February 24, 2008	Kitt Peak	Spacewatch	·	3.4 km	MPC · JPL
305462	2008 DO_{24}	—	February 28, 2008	Mount Lemmon	Mount Lemmon Survey	·	2.9 km	MPC · JPL
305463	2008 DN_{25}	—	February 29, 2008	Purple Mountain	PMO NEO Survey Program	·	3.1 km	MPC · JPL
305464	2008 DB_{26}	—	February 29, 2008	Purple Mountain	PMO NEO Survey Program	·	3.8 km	MPC · JPL
305465	2008 DE_{30}	—	February 26, 2008	Kitt Peak	Spacewatch	·	3.3 km	MPC · JPL
305466	2008 DW_{33}	—	February 27, 2008	Catalina	CSS	EMA	3.8 km	MPC · JPL
305467	2008 DR_{36}	—	February 27, 2008	Mount Lemmon	Mount Lemmon Survey	·	3.8 km	MPC · JPL
305468	2008 DU_{38}	—	February 27, 2008	Catalina	CSS	(159)	3.9 km	MPC · JPL
305469	2008 DY_{38}	—	February 27, 2008	Mount Lemmon	Mount Lemmon Survey	·	3.3 km	MPC · JPL
305470	2008 DE_{40}	—	February 27, 2008	Catalina	CSS	LIX	5.2 km	MPC · JPL
305471	2008 DB_{46}	—	February 28, 2008	Mount Lemmon	Mount Lemmon Survey	·	2.8 km	MPC · JPL
305472	2008 DM_{48}	—	February 28, 2008	Kitt Peak	Spacewatch	·	4.0 km	MPC · JPL
305473	2008 DS_{48}	—	February 29, 2008	Catalina	CSS	BRA	2.2 km	MPC · JPL
305474	2008 DF_{49}	—	February 29, 2008	Catalina	CSS	·	3.7 km	MPC · JPL
305475	2008 DT_{54}	—	February 28, 2008	Catalina	CSS	EOS	2.4 km	MPC · JPL
305476	2008 DY_{56}	—	February 27, 2008	Catalina	CSS	·	5.1 km	MPC · JPL
305477	2008 DU_{59}	—	February 27, 2008	Mount Lemmon	Mount Lemmon Survey	HYG	3.6 km	MPC · JPL
305478	2008 DE_{62}	—	February 28, 2008	Kitt Peak	Spacewatch	·	4.5 km	MPC · JPL
305479	2008 DQ_{68}	—	February 29, 2008	Kitt Peak	Spacewatch	·	3.4 km	MPC · JPL
305480	2008 DT_{71}	—	February 24, 2008	Kitt Peak	Spacewatch	·	2.3 km	MPC · JPL
305481	2008 DZ_{72}	—	February 26, 2008	Mount Lemmon	Mount Lemmon Survey	·	2.9 km	MPC · JPL
305482	2008 DG_{73}	—	February 26, 2008	Mount Lemmon	Mount Lemmon Survey	EOS	2.2 km	MPC · JPL
305483	2008 DH_{74}	—	February 28, 2008	Mount Lemmon	Mount Lemmon Survey	·	2.1 km	MPC · JPL
305484	2008 DB_{84}	—	February 18, 2008	Mount Lemmon	Mount Lemmon Survey	EMA	3.9 km	MPC · JPL
305485	2008 DL_{88}	—	February 18, 2008	Mount Lemmon	Mount Lemmon Survey	·	2.8 km	MPC · JPL
305486	2008 DC_{89}	—	February 28, 2008	Kitt Peak	Spacewatch	·	1.9 km	MPC · JPL
305487	2008 EZ_{1}	—	March 1, 2008	Kitt Peak	Spacewatch	·	4.9 km	MPC · JPL
305488	2008 ER_{3}	—	March 1, 2008	Anderson Mesa	LONEOS	·	4.4 km	MPC · JPL
305489	2008 EN_{13}	—	March 1, 2008	Kitt Peak	Spacewatch	EOS	2.6 km	MPC · JPL
305490	2008 EC_{14}	—	March 1, 2008	Kitt Peak	Spacewatch	·	2.4 km	MPC · JPL
305491	2008 EK_{24}	—	March 3, 2008	Mount Lemmon	Mount Lemmon Survey	·	3.2 km	MPC · JPL
305492	2008 ES_{35}	—	March 3, 2008	Kitt Peak	Spacewatch	·	2.6 km	MPC · JPL
305493	2008 EQ_{40}	—	March 4, 2008	Kitt Peak	Spacewatch	·	3.3 km	MPC · JPL
305494	2008 EQ_{47}	—	March 5, 2008	Mount Lemmon	Mount Lemmon Survey	HYG	3.0 km	MPC · JPL
305495	2008 EK_{58}	—	March 8, 2008	Kitt Peak	Spacewatch	·	2.4 km	MPC · JPL
305496	2008 EN_{68}	—	March 7, 2008	Catalina	CSS	·	3.5 km	MPC · JPL
305497	2008 EP_{74}	—	March 7, 2008	Kitt Peak	Spacewatch	·	2.7 km	MPC · JPL
305498	2008 EU_{74}	—	March 7, 2008	Kitt Peak	Spacewatch	·	2.9 km	MPC · JPL
305499	2008 EJ_{87}	—	March 8, 2008	Catalina	CSS	·	3.7 km	MPC · JPL
305500	2008 EM_{96}	—	March 7, 2008	Mount Lemmon	Mount Lemmon Survey	EOS	2.2 km	MPC · JPL

== 305501–305600 ==
back to top

Designation			Discovery			Properties		Ref
Permanent	Provisional	Named after	Date	Site	Discoverer(s)	Category	Diam.	Ref
305501	2008 EM_{98}	—	March 3, 2008	Catalina	CSS	·	4.5 km	MPC · JPL
305502	2008 EU_{100}	—	March 8, 2008	Goodricke-Pigott	R. A. Tucker	·	6.4 km	MPC · JPL
305503	2008 EK_{108}	—	March 7, 2008	Mount Lemmon	Mount Lemmon Survey	·	2.3 km	MPC · JPL
305504	2008 ED_{109}	—	March 7, 2008	Mount Lemmon	Mount Lemmon Survey	·	3.4 km	MPC · JPL
305505	2008 EB_{116}	—	March 8, 2008	Mount Lemmon	Mount Lemmon Survey	·	2.7 km	MPC · JPL
305506	2008 EL_{116}	—	March 8, 2008	Kitt Peak	Spacewatch	·	2.8 km	MPC · JPL
305507	2008 EK_{117}	—	March 8, 2008	Kitt Peak	Spacewatch	·	2.7 km	MPC · JPL
305508	2008 EE_{146}	—	March 11, 2008	Mount Lemmon	Mount Lemmon Survey	·	7.0 km	MPC · JPL
305509	2008 ET_{146}	—	March 10, 2008	Catalina	CSS	EOS	2.5 km	MPC · JPL
305510	2008 EX_{148}	—	March 2, 2008	Kitt Peak	Spacewatch	·	2.8 km	MPC · JPL
305511	2008 EE_{150}	—	March 7, 2008	Catalina	CSS	EOS	2.5 km	MPC · JPL
305512	2008 EU_{158}	—	March 11, 2008	Kitt Peak	Spacewatch	CYB	4.0 km	MPC · JPL
305513	2008 EC_{163}	—	March 8, 2008	Kitt Peak	Spacewatch	·	4.7 km	MPC · JPL
305514	2008 EB_{167}	—	March 7, 2008	Mount Lemmon	Mount Lemmon Survey	·	2.6 km	MPC · JPL
305515	2008 FF_{4}	—	March 25, 2008	Kitt Peak	Spacewatch	·	3.6 km	MPC · JPL
305516	2008 FQ_{9}	—	November 18, 1995	Kitt Peak	Spacewatch	·	2.2 km	MPC · JPL
305517	2008 FB_{11}	—	March 26, 2008	Kitt Peak	Spacewatch	·	2.9 km	MPC · JPL
305518	2008 FG_{12}	—	March 26, 2008	Mount Lemmon	Mount Lemmon Survey	·	3.0 km	MPC · JPL
305519	2008 FE_{17}	—	March 27, 2008	Kitt Peak	Spacewatch	·	2.9 km	MPC · JPL
305520	2008 FU_{18}	—	March 27, 2008	Mount Lemmon	Mount Lemmon Survey	·	2.2 km	MPC · JPL
305521	2008 FV_{19}	—	March 27, 2008	Mount Lemmon	Mount Lemmon Survey	THM	2.6 km	MPC · JPL
305522	2008 FA_{35}	—	March 28, 2008	Mount Lemmon	Mount Lemmon Survey	·	3.2 km	MPC · JPL
305523	2008 FV_{36}	—	March 28, 2008	Mount Lemmon	Mount Lemmon Survey	·	4.8 km	MPC · JPL
305524	2008 FC_{43}	—	March 28, 2008	Mount Lemmon	Mount Lemmon Survey	·	2.8 km	MPC · JPL
305525	2008 FB_{60}	—	March 29, 2008	Catalina	CSS	·	3.3 km	MPC · JPL
305526	2008 FB_{64}	—	March 28, 2008	Mount Lemmon	Mount Lemmon Survey	·	2.6 km	MPC · JPL
305527	2008 FN_{91}	—	March 29, 2008	Mount Lemmon	Mount Lemmon Survey	·	3.3 km	MPC · JPL
305528	2008 FK_{123}	—	March 28, 2008	Kitt Peak	Spacewatch	EUP	4.1 km	MPC · JPL
305529	2008 FS_{123}	—	March 29, 2008	Kitt Peak	Spacewatch	·	4.0 km	MPC · JPL
305530	2008 FZ_{125}	—	March 29, 2008	Piszkéstető	K. Sárneczky	·	1.8 km	MPC · JPL
305531	2008 GS_{2}	—	April 5, 2008	Mount Lemmon	Mount Lemmon Survey	·	2.4 km	MPC · JPL
305532	2008 GS_{7}	—	April 1, 2008	Mount Lemmon	Mount Lemmon Survey	·	3.6 km	MPC · JPL
305533	2008 GN_{10}	—	April 1, 2008	Kitt Peak	Spacewatch	·	3.8 km	MPC · JPL
305534	2008 GW_{27}	—	April 3, 2008	Mount Lemmon	Mount Lemmon Survey	THM	2.8 km	MPC · JPL
305535	2008 GE_{52}	—	April 5, 2008	Mount Lemmon	Mount Lemmon Survey	THM	2.4 km	MPC · JPL
305536	2008 GU_{59}	—	April 5, 2008	Kitt Peak	Spacewatch	·	4.3 km	MPC · JPL
305537	2008 GM_{64}	—	April 6, 2008	Kitt Peak	Spacewatch	·	2.3 km	MPC · JPL
305538	2008 GR_{82}	—	April 8, 2008	Kitt Peak	Spacewatch	·	5.8 km	MPC · JPL
305539	2008 GE_{129}	—	April 1, 2008	Kitt Peak	Spacewatch	·	2.9 km	MPC · JPL
305540	2008 HB_{7}	—	April 24, 2008	Mount Lemmon	Mount Lemmon Survey	EOS	2.2 km	MPC · JPL
305541	2008 HN_{20}	—	April 26, 2008	Mount Lemmon	Mount Lemmon Survey	·	2.9 km	MPC · JPL
305542	2008 HU_{48}	—	April 29, 2008	Kitt Peak	Spacewatch	·	3.2 km	MPC · JPL
305543	2008 QY_{40}	—	August 25, 2008	Palomar	M. E. Schwamb, M. E. Brown, D. L. Rabinowitz	SDO	314 km	MPC · JPL
305544	2008 QS_{47}	—	June 26, 2007	Kitt Peak	Spacewatch	L4	10 km	MPC · JPL
305545	2008 SO_{73}	—	September 23, 2008	Kitt Peak	Spacewatch	·	860 m	MPC · JPL
305546	2008 SP_{211}	—	September 28, 2008	Mount Lemmon	Mount Lemmon Survey	·	640 m	MPC · JPL
305547	2008 SY_{256}	—	September 21, 2008	Catalina	CSS	·	1.1 km	MPC · JPL
305548	2008 TO_{22}	—	October 1, 2008	Kitt Peak	Spacewatch	·	770 m	MPC · JPL
305549	2008 UV_{38}	—	October 20, 2008	Kitt Peak	Spacewatch	·	850 m	MPC · JPL
305550	2008 UL_{70}	—	October 21, 2008	Kitt Peak	Spacewatch	·	1.1 km	MPC · JPL
305551	2008 UJ_{119}	—	October 22, 2008	Kitt Peak	Spacewatch	·	1.1 km	MPC · JPL
305552	2008 UC_{126}	—	October 22, 2008	Kitt Peak	Spacewatch	·	840 m	MPC · JPL
305553	2008 UL_{182}	—	October 24, 2008	Mount Lemmon	Mount Lemmon Survey	·	620 m	MPC · JPL
305554	2008 UM_{187}	—	October 24, 2008	Kitt Peak	Spacewatch	BAP	1.1 km	MPC · JPL
305555	2008 UM_{217}	—	October 25, 2008	Kitt Peak	Spacewatch	·	920 m	MPC · JPL
305556	2008 UG_{270}	—	October 28, 2008	Kitt Peak	Spacewatch	·	710 m	MPC · JPL
305557	2008 UJ_{282}	—	October 28, 2008	Kitt Peak	Spacewatch	·	2.0 km	MPC · JPL
305558	2008 UT_{304}	—	October 29, 2008	Mount Lemmon	Mount Lemmon Survey	·	900 m	MPC · JPL
305559	2008 UQ_{336}	—	October 23, 2008	Kitt Peak	Spacewatch	·	950 m	MPC · JPL
305560	2008 UR_{370}	—	October 31, 2008	Mount Lemmon	Mount Lemmon Survey	·	2.2 km	MPC · JPL
305561	2008 VA_{23}	—	November 1, 2008	Mount Lemmon	Mount Lemmon Survey	·	1.6 km	MPC · JPL
305562	2008 VT_{39}	—	November 2, 2008	Kitt Peak	Spacewatch	·	830 m	MPC · JPL
305563	2008 VL_{58}	—	November 6, 2008	Kitt Peak	Spacewatch	PHO	1.2 km	MPC · JPL
305564	2008 VO_{76}	—	November 1, 2008	Mount Lemmon	Mount Lemmon Survey	·	760 m	MPC · JPL
305565	2008 WH_{42}	—	November 17, 2008	Kitt Peak	Spacewatch	·	880 m	MPC · JPL
305566	2008 WK_{45}	—	November 8, 2008	Kitt Peak	Spacewatch	·	1.3 km	MPC · JPL
305567	2008 WC_{58}	—	November 20, 2008	Mount Lemmon	Mount Lemmon Survey	·	720 m	MPC · JPL
305568	2008 WR_{72}	—	November 19, 2008	Kitt Peak	Spacewatch	·	810 m	MPC · JPL
305569	2008 WG_{89}	—	November 21, 2008	Mount Lemmon	Mount Lemmon Survey	NYS	660 m	MPC · JPL
305570	2008 WG_{113}	—	November 30, 2008	Kitt Peak	Spacewatch	·	960 m	MPC · JPL
305571	2008 WZ_{139}	—	November 24, 2008	Mount Lemmon	Mount Lemmon Survey	NYS	1.4 km	MPC · JPL
305572	2008 WE_{140}	—	November 24, 2008	Mount Lemmon	Mount Lemmon Survey	MRX	1.5 km	MPC · JPL
305573	2008 XJ_{3}	—	December 6, 2008	Bisei SG Center	BATTeRS	·	3.6 km	MPC · JPL
305574	2008 XA_{30}	—	December 1, 2008	Kitt Peak	Spacewatch	(2076)	1.1 km	MPC · JPL
305575	2008 XO_{37}	—	December 2, 2008	Kitt Peak	Spacewatch	·	1.2 km	MPC · JPL
305576	2008 XC_{47}	—	December 4, 2008	Catalina	CSS	PHO	1.3 km	MPC · JPL
305577	2008 YY_{5}	—	December 22, 2008	Piszkéstető	K. Sárneczky	·	1.7 km	MPC · JPL
305578	2008 YZ_{12}	—	December 21, 2008	Kitt Peak	Spacewatch	·	1.1 km	MPC · JPL
305579	2008 YG_{17}	—	December 21, 2008	Mount Lemmon	Mount Lemmon Survey	·	1.7 km	MPC · JPL
305580	2008 YO_{22}	—	December 21, 2008	Mount Lemmon	Mount Lemmon Survey	DOR	3.3 km	MPC · JPL
305581	2008 YU_{42}	—	December 29, 2008	Kitt Peak	Spacewatch	·	1 km	MPC · JPL
305582	2008 YX_{44}	—	January 29, 1998	Modra	A. Galád, A. Pravda	·	1.2 km	MPC · JPL
305583	2008 YP_{46}	—	December 29, 2008	Mount Lemmon	Mount Lemmon Survey	·	920 m	MPC · JPL
305584	2008 YX_{47}	—	December 29, 2008	Kitt Peak	Spacewatch	MAS	770 m	MPC · JPL
305585	2008 YP_{50}	—	December 29, 2008	Mount Lemmon	Mount Lemmon Survey	NYS	1.4 km	MPC · JPL
305586	2008 YC_{53}	—	December 29, 2008	Mount Lemmon	Mount Lemmon Survey	NYS	1.3 km	MPC · JPL
305587	2008 YC_{63}	—	December 30, 2008	Mount Lemmon	Mount Lemmon Survey	NYS	1.1 km	MPC · JPL
305588	2008 YM_{64}	—	December 30, 2008	Mount Lemmon	Mount Lemmon Survey	·	1.4 km	MPC · JPL
305589	2008 YG_{75}	—	December 30, 2008	Mount Lemmon	Mount Lemmon Survey	·	2.9 km	MPC · JPL
305590	2008 YD_{87}	—	December 29, 2008	Kitt Peak	Spacewatch	·	1.1 km	MPC · JPL
305591	2008 YA_{88}	—	December 29, 2008	Kitt Peak	Spacewatch	·	920 m	MPC · JPL
305592	2008 YO_{95}	—	September 22, 2003	Kitt Peak	Spacewatch	·	1.7 km	MPC · JPL
305593	2008 YR_{95}	—	December 29, 2008	Kitt Peak	Spacewatch	·	1.9 km	MPC · JPL
305594	2008 YL_{100}	—	December 29, 2008	Kitt Peak	Spacewatch	·	1.5 km	MPC · JPL
305595	2008 YD_{106}	—	December 29, 2008	Kitt Peak	Spacewatch	·	970 m	MPC · JPL
305596	2008 YQ_{108}	—	December 29, 2008	Kitt Peak	Spacewatch	MAS	810 m	MPC · JPL
305597	2008 YY_{118}	—	December 29, 2008	Kitt Peak	Spacewatch	·	680 m	MPC · JPL
305598	2008 YF_{120}	—	December 30, 2008	Kitt Peak	Spacewatch	NEM	2.7 km	MPC · JPL
305599	2008 YB_{124}	—	December 30, 2008	Kitt Peak	Spacewatch	V	960 m	MPC · JPL
305600	2008 YC_{127}	—	December 30, 2008	Kitt Peak	Spacewatch	·	1.6 km	MPC · JPL

== 305601–305700 ==
back to top

Designation			Discovery			Properties		Ref
Permanent	Provisional	Named after	Date	Site	Discoverer(s)	Category	Diam.	Ref
305601	2008 YC_{134}	—	December 30, 2008	Kitt Peak	Spacewatch	·	1.5 km	MPC · JPL
305602	2008 YN_{135}	—	December 30, 2008	La Sagra	OAM	·	1.0 km	MPC · JPL
305603	2008 YV_{135}	—	December 30, 2008	Kitt Peak	Spacewatch	MAS	850 m	MPC · JPL
305604	2008 YW_{144}	—	December 30, 2008	Kitt Peak	Spacewatch	·	1.4 km	MPC · JPL
305605	2008 YZ_{152}	—	December 30, 2008	Mount Lemmon	Mount Lemmon Survey	·	800 m	MPC · JPL
305606	2008 YF_{154}	—	December 22, 2008	Kitt Peak	Spacewatch	·	1.4 km	MPC · JPL
305607	2008 YR_{156}	—	December 30, 2008	Mount Lemmon	Mount Lemmon Survey	·	1.3 km	MPC · JPL
305608	2008 YG_{157}	—	December 29, 2008	Kitt Peak	Spacewatch	·	700 m	MPC · JPL
305609	2008 YH_{158}	—	December 31, 2008	Mount Lemmon	Mount Lemmon Survey	·	1.2 km	MPC · JPL
305610	2008 YL_{158}	—	December 31, 2008	Mount Lemmon	Mount Lemmon Survey	·	1.4 km	MPC · JPL
305611	2008 YW_{159}	—	December 22, 2008	Mount Lemmon	Mount Lemmon Survey	·	1.3 km	MPC · JPL
305612	2008 YY_{160}	—	December 30, 2008	Catalina	CSS	·	790 m	MPC · JPL
305613	2008 YE_{170}	—	December 22, 2008	Socorro	LINEAR	PHO	3.8 km	MPC · JPL
305614	2008 YV_{170}	—	December 31, 2008	Kitt Peak	Spacewatch	·	1.2 km	MPC · JPL
305615	2009 AL_{1}	—	January 2, 2009	Weihai	University, Shandong	V	740 m	MPC · JPL
305616	2009 AM_{10}	—	January 2, 2009	Mount Lemmon	Mount Lemmon Survey	·	870 m	MPC · JPL
305617	2009 AX_{15}	—	January 15, 2009	Farra d'Isonzo	Farra d'Isonzo	·	780 m	MPC · JPL
305618	2009 AN_{19}	—	January 2, 2009	Mount Lemmon	Mount Lemmon Survey	·	1.5 km	MPC · JPL
305619	2009 AP_{23}	—	January 3, 2009	Kitt Peak	Spacewatch	·	2.7 km	MPC · JPL
305620	2009 AT_{24}	—	January 3, 2009	Kitt Peak	Spacewatch	·	1.4 km	MPC · JPL
305621	2009 AE_{29}	—	January 15, 2009	Kitt Peak	Spacewatch	NYS	1.3 km	MPC · JPL
305622	2009 AV_{30}	—	January 15, 2009	Kitt Peak	Spacewatch	V	760 m	MPC · JPL
305623	2009 AD_{32}	—	January 15, 2009	Kitt Peak	Spacewatch	·	1.8 km	MPC · JPL
305624	2009 AD_{33}	—	January 15, 2009	Kitt Peak	Spacewatch	(2076)	1.1 km	MPC · JPL
305625	2009 AJ_{36}	—	January 15, 2009	Kitt Peak	Spacewatch	·	1.6 km	MPC · JPL
305626	2009 AH_{41}	—	January 15, 2009	Kitt Peak	Spacewatch	·	740 m	MPC · JPL
305627	2009 AO_{45}	—	January 2, 2009	Kitt Peak	Spacewatch	·	3.6 km	MPC · JPL
305628	2009 BQ_{2}	—	January 19, 2009	Mayhill	Lowe, A.	·	1.3 km	MPC · JPL
305629	2009 BM_{8}	—	January 17, 2009	Socorro	LINEAR	NYS	990 m	MPC · JPL
305630	2009 BS_{9}	—	January 18, 2009	Socorro	LINEAR	·	2.1 km	MPC · JPL
305631	2009 BN_{12}	—	January 26, 2009	Wildberg	R. Apitzsch	·	1.7 km	MPC · JPL
305632	2009 BB_{13}	—	January 22, 2009	Socorro	LINEAR	·	1.8 km	MPC · JPL
305633	2009 BY_{22}	—	January 17, 2009	Kitt Peak	Spacewatch	(5)	1.3 km	MPC · JPL
305634	2009 BC_{25}	—	January 18, 2009	Kitt Peak	Spacewatch	·	1.5 km	MPC · JPL
305635	2009 BM_{25}	—	January 19, 2009	Mount Lemmon	Mount Lemmon Survey	NYS	1.6 km	MPC · JPL
305636	2009 BR_{30}	—	January 16, 2009	Kitt Peak	Spacewatch	MAS	820 m	MPC · JPL
305637	2009 BG_{31}	—	January 16, 2009	Kitt Peak	Spacewatch	MAS	880 m	MPC · JPL
305638	2009 BD_{36}	—	January 16, 2009	Kitt Peak	Spacewatch	NYS	1.0 km	MPC · JPL
305639	2009 BA_{39}	—	January 16, 2009	Kitt Peak	Spacewatch	V	890 m	MPC · JPL
305640	2009 BZ_{39}	—	January 16, 2009	Kitt Peak	Spacewatch	HNS	1.8 km	MPC · JPL
305641	2009 BD_{40}	—	January 16, 2009	Kitt Peak	Spacewatch	·	1.4 km	MPC · JPL
305642	2009 BR_{41}	—	January 16, 2009	Kitt Peak	Spacewatch	NYS	1.4 km	MPC · JPL
305643	2009 BP_{42}	—	January 16, 2009	Kitt Peak	Spacewatch	NYS	1.4 km	MPC · JPL
305644	2009 BA_{44}	—	January 16, 2009	Kitt Peak	Spacewatch	·	1.4 km	MPC · JPL
305645	2009 BH_{45}	—	January 16, 2009	Kitt Peak	Spacewatch	·	1.6 km	MPC · JPL
305646	2009 BX_{47}	—	January 16, 2009	Mount Lemmon	Mount Lemmon Survey	·	1.6 km	MPC · JPL
305647	2009 BG_{51}	—	January 16, 2009	Kitt Peak	Spacewatch	·	1.7 km	MPC · JPL
305648	2009 BW_{51}	—	January 16, 2009	Mount Lemmon	Mount Lemmon Survey	·	1.2 km	MPC · JPL
305649	2009 BF_{53}	—	January 16, 2009	Mount Lemmon	Mount Lemmon Survey	·	1.3 km	MPC · JPL
305650	2009 BW_{54}	—	January 16, 2009	Mount Lemmon	Mount Lemmon Survey	NYS	1.1 km	MPC · JPL
305651	2009 BL_{55}	—	January 16, 2009	Mount Lemmon	Mount Lemmon Survey	·	1.9 km	MPC · JPL
305652	2009 BB_{56}	—	January 17, 2009	Catalina	CSS	V	840 m	MPC · JPL
305653	2009 BW_{57}	—	January 20, 2009	Kitt Peak	Spacewatch	·	2.5 km	MPC · JPL
305654	2009 BY_{61}	—	January 18, 2009	Mount Lemmon	Mount Lemmon Survey	NYS	1.2 km	MPC · JPL
305655	2009 BZ_{64}	—	January 20, 2009	Kitt Peak	Spacewatch	NYS	1.3 km	MPC · JPL
305656	2009 BU_{68}	—	January 25, 2009	Kitt Peak	Spacewatch	NYS	1.5 km	MPC · JPL
305657	2009 BS_{69}	—	January 25, 2009	Catalina	CSS	NYS	1.3 km	MPC · JPL
305658	2009 BD_{71}	—	January 26, 2009	Purple Mountain	PMO NEO Survey Program	·	1.5 km	MPC · JPL
305659	2009 BE_{73}	—	January 29, 2009	Socorro	LINEAR	NYS	1.4 km	MPC · JPL
305660 Romyhaag	2009 BJ_{73}	Romyhaag	January 29, 2009	Calar Alto	F. Hormuth	·	2.0 km	MPC · JPL
305661 Joejackson	2009 BN_{73}	Joejackson	January 29, 2009	Calar Alto	F. Hormuth	·	720 m	MPC · JPL
305662	2009 BM_{76}	—	January 26, 2009	Purple Mountain	PMO NEO Survey Program	·	1.7 km	MPC · JPL
305663	2009 BP_{77}	—	January 25, 2009	Socorro	LINEAR	·	1.5 km	MPC · JPL
305664	2009 BH_{80}	—	January 31, 2009	Socorro	LINEAR	·	1.6 km	MPC · JPL
305665	2009 BM_{80}	—	January 31, 2009	Socorro	LINEAR	·	1.8 km	MPC · JPL
305666	2009 BY_{80}	—	January 31, 2009	Sierra Stars	Tozzi, F.	PHO	1.3 km	MPC · JPL
305667	2009 BF_{83}	—	January 20, 2009	Catalina	CSS	·	2.9 km	MPC · JPL
305668	2009 BN_{85}	—	January 25, 2009	Kitt Peak	Spacewatch	NYS	980 m	MPC · JPL
305669	2009 BZ_{89}	—	January 25, 2009	Kitt Peak	Spacewatch	MAS	950 m	MPC · JPL
305670	2009 BL_{90}	—	January 25, 2009	Kitt Peak	Spacewatch	V	790 m	MPC · JPL
305671	2009 BA_{93}	—	January 25, 2009	Kitt Peak	Spacewatch	·	1.0 km	MPC · JPL
305672	2009 BF_{93}	—	January 25, 2009	Kitt Peak	Spacewatch	V	770 m	MPC · JPL
305673	2009 BH_{93}	—	January 25, 2009	Kitt Peak	Spacewatch	·	1.4 km	MPC · JPL
305674	2009 BX_{93}	—	January 25, 2009	Kitt Peak	Spacewatch	·	1.4 km	MPC · JPL
305675	2009 BO_{99}	—	January 28, 2009	Catalina	CSS	·	2.5 km	MPC · JPL
305676	2009 BF_{100}	—	January 29, 2009	Kitt Peak	Spacewatch	·	1.3 km	MPC · JPL
305677	2009 BA_{104}	—	January 25, 2009	Kitt Peak	Spacewatch	·	2.1 km	MPC · JPL
305678	2009 BS_{104}	—	January 25, 2009	Kitt Peak	Spacewatch	·	1.6 km	MPC · JPL
305679	2009 BP_{106}	—	January 26, 2009	Purple Mountain	PMO NEO Survey Program	NYS	1.3 km	MPC · JPL
305680	2009 BH_{107}	—	January 29, 2009	Kitt Peak	Spacewatch	·	1.5 km	MPC · JPL
305681	2009 BR_{107}	—	January 29, 2009	Mount Lemmon	Mount Lemmon Survey	NYS	1.2 km	MPC · JPL
305682	2009 BA_{115}	—	January 26, 2009	Kitt Peak	Spacewatch	·	1.5 km	MPC · JPL
305683	2009 BK_{117}	—	January 29, 2009	Mount Lemmon	Mount Lemmon Survey	·	1.8 km	MPC · JPL
305684	2009 BB_{124}	—	January 31, 2009	Kitt Peak	Spacewatch	·	990 m	MPC · JPL
305685	2009 BY_{124}	—	January 31, 2009	Kitt Peak	Spacewatch	·	2.3 km	MPC · JPL
305686	2009 BF_{125}	—	January 31, 2009	Kitt Peak	Spacewatch	·	1.1 km	MPC · JPL
305687	2009 BM_{125}	—	January 26, 2009	Mount Lemmon	Mount Lemmon Survey	·	1.2 km	MPC · JPL
305688	2009 BF_{127}	—	January 29, 2009	Kitt Peak	Spacewatch	·	1.6 km	MPC · JPL
305689	2009 BS_{129}	—	January 30, 2009	Mount Lemmon	Mount Lemmon Survey	·	1.5 km	MPC · JPL
305690	2009 BB_{130}	—	January 31, 2009	Mount Lemmon	Mount Lemmon Survey	·	2.5 km	MPC · JPL
305691	2009 BH_{130}	—	January 31, 2009	Mount Lemmon	Mount Lemmon Survey	·	1.7 km	MPC · JPL
305692	2009 BT_{130}	—	January 31, 2009	Mount Lemmon	Mount Lemmon Survey	TIR	3.8 km	MPC · JPL
305693	2009 BB_{131}	—	January 31, 2009	Mount Lemmon	Mount Lemmon Survey	V	660 m	MPC · JPL
305694	2009 BM_{138}	—	January 29, 2009	Kitt Peak	Spacewatch	·	1.3 km	MPC · JPL
305695	2009 BT_{146}	—	January 30, 2009	Mount Lemmon	Mount Lemmon Survey	·	1.1 km	MPC · JPL
305696	2009 BA_{147}	—	January 30, 2009	Mount Lemmon	Mount Lemmon Survey	·	1.4 km	MPC · JPL
305697	2009 BR_{149}	—	January 31, 2009	Kitt Peak	Spacewatch	KON	3.6 km	MPC · JPL
305698	2009 BE_{157}	—	January 31, 2009	Kitt Peak	Spacewatch	·	1.3 km	MPC · JPL
305699	2009 BY_{157}	—	January 31, 2009	Kitt Peak	Spacewatch	·	950 m	MPC · JPL
305700	2009 BR_{165}	—	January 31, 2009	Kitt Peak	Spacewatch	·	1.0 km	MPC · JPL

== 305701–305800 ==
back to top

Designation			Discovery			Properties		Ref
Permanent	Provisional	Named after	Date	Site	Discoverer(s)	Category	Diam.	Ref
305701	2009 BV_{166}	—	January 31, 2009	Mount Lemmon	Mount Lemmon Survey	NYS	1.0 km	MPC · JPL
305702	2009 BO_{168}	—	January 25, 2009	Cerro Burek	Burek, Cerro	·	1.7 km	MPC · JPL
305703	2009 BE_{169}	—	January 29, 2009	Cerro Burek	Burek, Cerro	·	920 m	MPC · JPL
305704	2009 BG_{172}	—	January 18, 2009	Kitt Peak	Spacewatch	·	1.1 km	MPC · JPL
305705	2009 BD_{175}	—	January 26, 2009	Catalina	CSS	·	1.4 km	MPC · JPL
305706	2009 BR_{176}	—	January 31, 2009	Kitt Peak	Spacewatch	(5)	1.5 km	MPC · JPL
305707	2009 BS_{176}	—	January 31, 2009	Kitt Peak	Spacewatch	NYS	1.2 km	MPC · JPL
305708	2009 BA_{177}	—	January 18, 2009	Kitt Peak	Spacewatch	·	1.3 km	MPC · JPL
305709	2009 BN_{178}	—	January 20, 2009	Mount Lemmon	Mount Lemmon Survey	·	980 m	MPC · JPL
305710	2009 BU_{179}	—	January 18, 2009	Kitt Peak	Spacewatch	·	1.1 km	MPC · JPL
305711	2009 BF_{181}	—	January 17, 2009	Mount Lemmon	Mount Lemmon Survey	·	1.6 km	MPC · JPL
305712	2009 BJ_{181}	—	January 18, 2009	Catalina	CSS	·	1.1 km	MPC · JPL
305713	2009 BG_{182}	—	January 16, 2009	Kitt Peak	Spacewatch	NEM	2.7 km	MPC · JPL
305714	2009 BL_{182}	—	January 17, 2009	Kitt Peak	Spacewatch	·	730 m	MPC · JPL
305715	2009 BU_{188}	—	January 30, 2009	Mount Lemmon	Mount Lemmon Survey	EOS	2.1 km	MPC · JPL
305716	2009 CQ_{6}	—	February 14, 2009	Great Shefford	Birtwhistle, P.	(2076)	990 m	MPC · JPL
305717	2009 CH_{7}	—	February 1, 2009	Catalina	CSS	·	1.5 km	MPC · JPL
305718	2009 CC_{11}	—	February 1, 2009	Mount Lemmon	Mount Lemmon Survey	·	1.0 km	MPC · JPL
305719	2009 CF_{14}	—	February 2, 2009	Mount Lemmon	Mount Lemmon Survey	·	1.3 km	MPC · JPL
305720	2009 CM_{20}	—	February 1, 2009	Kitt Peak	Spacewatch	·	1.0 km	MPC · JPL
305721	2009 CH_{26}	—	February 1, 2009	Kitt Peak	Spacewatch	·	2.3 km	MPC · JPL
305722	2009 CS_{28}	—	February 1, 2009	Kitt Peak	Spacewatch	·	1.5 km	MPC · JPL
305723	2009 CT_{28}	—	February 1, 2009	Kitt Peak	Spacewatch	MAS	930 m	MPC · JPL
305724	2009 CX_{28}	—	February 1, 2009	Kitt Peak	Spacewatch	·	1.3 km	MPC · JPL
305725	2009 CD_{33}	—	February 1, 2009	Kitt Peak	Spacewatch	MAS	720 m	MPC · JPL
305726	2009 CK_{33}	—	February 1, 2009	Kitt Peak	Spacewatch	·	1.4 km	MPC · JPL
305727	2009 CF_{37}	—	February 4, 2009	Catalina	CSS	·	1.6 km	MPC · JPL
305728	2009 CD_{38}	—	February 15, 2009	Dauban	Kugel, F.	·	1.0 km	MPC · JPL
305729	2009 CM_{38}	—	February 13, 2009	Kitt Peak	Spacewatch	PHO	1.1 km	MPC · JPL
305730	2009 CW_{38}	—	February 13, 2009	Kitt Peak	Spacewatch	NYS	1.4 km	MPC · JPL
305731	2009 CM_{39}	—	February 14, 2009	Kitt Peak	Spacewatch	·	1.4 km	MPC · JPL
305732	2009 CM_{42}	—	February 13, 2009	Kitt Peak	Spacewatch	RAF	1.1 km	MPC · JPL
305733	2009 CU_{44}	—	February 14, 2009	Mount Lemmon	Mount Lemmon Survey	·	1.6 km	MPC · JPL
305734	2009 CY_{44}	—	February 14, 2009	Mount Lemmon	Mount Lemmon Survey	·	1.6 km	MPC · JPL
305735	2009 CG_{46}	—	February 14, 2009	Kitt Peak	Spacewatch	·	1.6 km	MPC · JPL
305736	2009 CJ_{47}	—	February 14, 2009	Kitt Peak	Spacewatch	·	1.1 km	MPC · JPL
305737	2009 CM_{47}	—	February 14, 2009	Kitt Peak	Spacewatch	MRX	1.3 km	MPC · JPL
305738	2009 CC_{48}	—	February 14, 2009	Kitt Peak	Spacewatch	HOF	3.0 km	MPC · JPL
305739	2009 CH_{55}	—	November 3, 2004	Kitt Peak	Spacewatch	·	1.0 km	MPC · JPL
305740	2009 CC_{57}	—	February 13, 2009	Kitt Peak	Spacewatch	·	2.2 km	MPC · JPL
305741	2009 CP_{57}	—	February 2, 2009	Catalina	CSS	·	1.7 km	MPC · JPL
305742	2009 CD_{59}	—	February 5, 2009	Mount Lemmon	Mount Lemmon Survey	JUN	1.3 km	MPC · JPL
305743	2009 CC_{62}	—	February 1, 2009	Mount Lemmon	Mount Lemmon Survey	·	2.9 km	MPC · JPL
305744	2009 CE_{62}	—	February 2, 2009	Mount Lemmon	Mount Lemmon Survey	·	1.7 km	MPC · JPL
305745	2009 CC_{64}	—	February 2, 2009	Catalina	CSS	V	990 m	MPC · JPL
305746	2009 CT_{65}	—	February 3, 2009	Kitt Peak	Spacewatch	MAS	770 m	MPC · JPL
305747	2009 DF_{2}	—	February 16, 2009	Dauban	Kugel, F.	·	1.8 km	MPC · JPL
305748	2009 DS_{3}	—	February 16, 2009	Bisei SG Center	BATTeRS	·	1.6 km	MPC · JPL
305749	2009 DF_{5}	—	February 20, 2009	Calar Alto	F. Hormuth	·	2.3 km	MPC · JPL
305750	2009 DX_{6}	—	February 17, 2009	Kitt Peak	Spacewatch	·	1.3 km	MPC · JPL
305751	2009 DR_{7}	—	February 19, 2009	Kitt Peak	Spacewatch	·	4.4 km	MPC · JPL
305752	2009 DX_{7}	—	February 19, 2009	Mount Lemmon	Mount Lemmon Survey	·	1.8 km	MPC · JPL
305753	2009 DT_{8}	—	February 19, 2009	Mount Lemmon	Mount Lemmon Survey	·	1.3 km	MPC · JPL
305754	2009 DS_{11}	—	February 21, 2009	Tzec Maun	Karge, S.	·	2.3 km	MPC · JPL
305755	2009 DX_{11}	—	February 17, 2009	Socorro	LINEAR	NYS	1.4 km	MPC · JPL
305756	2009 DW_{12}	—	February 16, 2009	Kitt Peak	Spacewatch	·	750 m	MPC · JPL
305757	2009 DR_{15}	—	February 16, 2009	La Sagra	OAM	NYS	860 m	MPC · JPL
305758	2009 DW_{15}	—	February 16, 2009	La Sagra	OAM	·	1.4 km	MPC · JPL
305759	2009 DC_{16}	—	February 17, 2009	La Sagra	OAM	NYS	1.4 km	MPC · JPL
305760	2009 DD_{17}	—	February 21, 2009	La Sagra	OAM	HNS	1.6 km	MPC · JPL
305761	2009 DR_{24}	—	February 21, 2009	Kitt Peak	Spacewatch	·	1.8 km	MPC · JPL
305762	2009 DU_{24}	—	February 21, 2009	Kitt Peak	Spacewatch	·	2.6 km	MPC · JPL
305763	2009 DW_{30}	—	February 23, 2009	Calar Alto	F. Hormuth	·	1.8 km	MPC · JPL
305764	2009 DE_{31}	—	February 22, 2009	La Sagra	OAM	·	2.0 km	MPC · JPL
305765	2009 DS_{32}	—	February 20, 2009	Kitt Peak	Spacewatch	·	1.9 km	MPC · JPL
305766	2009 DT_{32}	—	February 20, 2009	Kitt Peak	Spacewatch	·	1.2 km	MPC · JPL
305767	2009 DG_{33}	—	February 20, 2009	Kitt Peak	Spacewatch	·	1.9 km	MPC · JPL
305768	2009 DU_{37}	—	February 23, 2009	Calar Alto	F. Hormuth	(7744)	1.4 km	MPC · JPL
305769	2009 DH_{40}	—	February 23, 2009	Dauban	Kugel, F.	·	4.0 km	MPC · JPL
305770	2009 DZ_{40}	—	February 16, 2009	La Sagra	OAM	·	1.4 km	MPC · JPL
305771	2009 DS_{41}	—	February 18, 2009	La Sagra	OAM	MAS	950 m	MPC · JPL
305772	2009 DF_{42}	—	February 22, 2009	La Sagra	OAM	JUN	1.4 km	MPC · JPL
305773	2009 DQ_{42}	—	February 18, 2009	La Sagra	OAM	·	1.1 km	MPC · JPL
305774	2009 DY_{45}	—	February 23, 2009	Socorro	LINEAR	·	1.3 km	MPC · JPL
305775	2009 DC_{46}	—	February 25, 2009	Marly	P. Kocher	·	1.9 km	MPC · JPL
305776 Susinnogabriele	2009 DE_{46}	Susinnogabriele	February 27, 2009	Vicques	M. Ory	·	1.8 km	MPC · JPL
305777	2009 DO_{47}	—	January 29, 2009	Mount Lemmon	Mount Lemmon Survey	·	1.3 km	MPC · JPL
305778	2009 DM_{49}	—	February 19, 2009	Kitt Peak	Spacewatch	MAS	680 m	MPC · JPL
305779	2009 DV_{49}	—	February 19, 2009	Kitt Peak	Spacewatch	·	2.0 km	MPC · JPL
305780	2009 DW_{49}	—	February 19, 2009	Kitt Peak	Spacewatch	·	1.2 km	MPC · JPL
305781	2009 DE_{50}	—	February 19, 2009	Kitt Peak	Spacewatch	·	800 m	MPC · JPL
305782	2009 DS_{51}	—	February 22, 2009	Kitt Peak	Spacewatch	NYS	1.3 km	MPC · JPL
305783	2009 DZ_{52}	—	February 22, 2009	Kitt Peak	Spacewatch	·	3.6 km	MPC · JPL
305784	2009 DL_{53}	—	February 22, 2009	Kitt Peak	Spacewatch	·	1.6 km	MPC · JPL
305785	2009 DK_{56}	—	February 22, 2009	Kitt Peak	Spacewatch	·	1.3 km	MPC · JPL
305786	2009 DX_{62}	—	February 22, 2009	Kitt Peak	Spacewatch	·	1.2 km	MPC · JPL
305787	2009 DU_{64}	—	February 19, 2009	Kitt Peak	Spacewatch	·	2.2 km	MPC · JPL
305788	2009 DF_{70}	—	February 26, 2009	Catalina	CSS	·	1.1 km	MPC · JPL
305789	2009 DK_{71}	—	February 18, 2009	La Sagra	OAM	MAS	860 m	MPC · JPL
305790	2009 DG_{75}	—	February 19, 2009	Catalina	CSS	·	1.2 km	MPC · JPL
305791	2009 DH_{75}	—	February 19, 2009	Catalina	CSS	·	2.3 km	MPC · JPL
305792	2009 DV_{75}	—	February 21, 2009	Mount Lemmon	Mount Lemmon Survey	·	900 m	MPC · JPL
305793	2009 DA_{76}	—	February 21, 2009	Mount Lemmon	Mount Lemmon Survey	·	2.0 km	MPC · JPL
305794	2009 DW_{81}	—	February 24, 2009	Kitt Peak	Spacewatch	·	2.3 km	MPC · JPL
305795	2009 DK_{82}	—	February 24, 2009	Kitt Peak	Spacewatch	·	2.1 km	MPC · JPL
305796	2009 DP_{84}	—	February 26, 2009	Kitt Peak	Spacewatch	KOR	1.7 km	MPC · JPL
305797	2009 DU_{84}	—	February 26, 2009	Kitt Peak	Spacewatch	·	2.5 km	MPC · JPL
305798	2009 DB_{86}	—	February 27, 2009	Kitt Peak	Spacewatch	·	1.7 km	MPC · JPL
305799	2009 DR_{88}	—	February 22, 2009	Kitt Peak	Spacewatch	·	2.4 km	MPC · JPL
305800	2009 DW_{89}	—	February 26, 2009	Mount Lemmon	Mount Lemmon Survey	·	1.6 km	MPC · JPL

== 305801–305900 ==
back to top

Designation			Discovery			Properties		Ref
Permanent	Provisional	Named after	Date	Site	Discoverer(s)	Category	Diam.	Ref
305801	2009 DD_{90}	—	February 26, 2009	Kitt Peak	Spacewatch	·	1.3 km	MPC · JPL
305802	2009 DH_{92}	—	February 28, 2009	Kitt Peak	Spacewatch	·	1.2 km	MPC · JPL
305803	2009 DY_{92}	—	February 28, 2009	Mount Lemmon	Mount Lemmon Survey	·	1.1 km	MPC · JPL
305804	2009 DC_{93}	—	February 28, 2009	Mount Lemmon	Mount Lemmon Survey	BRG	1.7 km	MPC · JPL
305805	2009 DO_{95}	—	February 25, 2009	Catalina	CSS	·	1.1 km	MPC · JPL
305806	2009 DU_{95}	—	October 21, 2007	Kitt Peak	Spacewatch	·	1.6 km	MPC · JPL
305807	2009 DB_{97}	—	February 26, 2009	Kitt Peak	Spacewatch	EUN	1.2 km	MPC · JPL
305808	2009 DE_{100}	—	February 26, 2009	Kitt Peak	Spacewatch	NYS	990 m	MPC · JPL
305809	2009 DQ_{100}	—	February 26, 2009	Kitt Peak	Spacewatch	·	2.4 km	MPC · JPL
305810	2009 DZ_{101}	—	February 26, 2009	Kitt Peak	Spacewatch	·	3.1 km	MPC · JPL
305811	2009 DH_{105}	—	February 26, 2009	Kitt Peak	Spacewatch	AEO	1.3 km	MPC · JPL
305812	2009 DK_{105}	—	February 26, 2009	Kitt Peak	Spacewatch	·	2.3 km	MPC · JPL
305813	2009 DM_{105}	—	February 26, 2009	Kitt Peak	Spacewatch	·	1.6 km	MPC · JPL
305814	2009 DS_{107}	—	February 24, 2009	Catalina	CSS	·	1.4 km	MPC · JPL
305815	2009 DT_{109}	—	February 19, 2009	Catalina	CSS	·	1.6 km	MPC · JPL
305816	2009 DN_{113}	—	February 27, 2009	Kitt Peak	Spacewatch	MAS	700 m	MPC · JPL
305817	2009 DV_{119}	—	February 27, 2009	Kitt Peak	Spacewatch	·	2.0 km	MPC · JPL
305818	2009 DZ_{120}	—	February 27, 2009	Kitt Peak	Spacewatch	AGN	1.3 km	MPC · JPL
305819	2009 DM_{122}	—	February 27, 2009	Kitt Peak	Spacewatch	·	1.2 km	MPC · JPL
305820	2009 DR_{124}	—	February 19, 2009	Kitt Peak	Spacewatch	ERI	1.4 km	MPC · JPL
305821	2009 DZ_{124}	—	February 19, 2009	Kitt Peak	Spacewatch	(12739)	2.1 km	MPC · JPL
305822	2009 DN_{125}	—	February 19, 2009	Kitt Peak	Spacewatch	MAS	650 m	MPC · JPL
305823	2009 DU_{126}	—	February 20, 2009	Kitt Peak	Spacewatch	·	2.6 km	MPC · JPL
305824	2009 DA_{127}	—	February 20, 2009	Kitt Peak	Spacewatch	NEM	2.0 km	MPC · JPL
305825	2009 DB_{127}	—	February 20, 2009	Kitt Peak	Spacewatch	HOF	3.2 km	MPC · JPL
305826	2009 DG_{127}	—	February 20, 2009	Mount Lemmon	Mount Lemmon Survey	·	860 m	MPC · JPL
305827	2009 DK_{128}	—	February 21, 2009	Kitt Peak	Spacewatch	MAS	610 m	MPC · JPL
305828	2009 DM_{128}	—	February 22, 2009	Kitt Peak	Spacewatch	·	2.2 km	MPC · JPL
305829	2009 DS_{128}	—	February 24, 2009	Kitt Peak	Spacewatch	HOF	2.7 km	MPC · JPL
305830	2009 DW_{128}	—	February 24, 2009	Kitt Peak	Spacewatch	·	2.2 km	MPC · JPL
305831	2009 DN_{129}	—	August 28, 2006	Kitt Peak	Spacewatch	AGN	1.5 km	MPC · JPL
305832	2009 DD_{133}	—	February 27, 2009	Kitt Peak	Spacewatch	NYS	1.2 km	MPC · JPL
305833	2009 DN_{133}	—	February 27, 2009	Kitt Peak	Spacewatch	AGN	1.2 km	MPC · JPL
305834	2009 DK_{136}	—	February 20, 2009	Kitt Peak	Spacewatch	·	4.6 km	MPC · JPL
305835	2009 DE_{137}	—	February 19, 2009	Catalina	CSS	·	1.7 km	MPC · JPL
305836	2009 DJ_{137}	—	February 19, 2009	Kitt Peak	Spacewatch	·	1.1 km	MPC · JPL
305837	2009 DV_{137}	—	February 19, 2009	Kitt Peak	Spacewatch	MAS	840 m	MPC · JPL
305838	2009 DM_{138}	—	February 20, 2009	Kitt Peak	Spacewatch	THM	2.5 km	MPC · JPL
305839	2009 DN_{138}	—	February 20, 2009	Kitt Peak	Spacewatch	·	960 m	MPC · JPL
305840	2009 DT_{138}	—	February 20, 2009	Kitt Peak	Spacewatch	·	2.2 km	MPC · JPL
305841	2009 DJ_{139}	—	February 27, 2009	Mount Lemmon	Mount Lemmon Survey	EUP	5.1 km	MPC · JPL
305842	2009 DY_{142}	—	February 27, 2009	Kitt Peak	Spacewatch	·	4.0 km	MPC · JPL
305843	2009 EB	—	March 1, 2009	Mayhill	Lowe, A.	·	3.5 km	MPC · JPL
305844	2009 EQ_{1}	—	March 2, 2009	Calvin-Rehoboth	Calvin College	·	2.0 km	MPC · JPL
305845	2009 EK_{3}	—	March 15, 2009	Sandlot	G. Hug	NYS	980 m	MPC · JPL
305846	2009 EW_{3}	—	March 15, 2009	La Sagra	OAM	AEO	1.4 km	MPC · JPL
305847	2009 EJ_{4}	—	March 15, 2009	La Sagra	OAM	·	920 m	MPC · JPL
305848	2009 EM_{4}	—	March 15, 2009	La Sagra	OAM	NYS	1.3 km	MPC · JPL
305849	2009 EW_{4}	—	March 15, 2009	La Sagra	OAM	·	2.7 km	MPC · JPL
305850	2009 EO_{5}	—	March 1, 2009	Mount Lemmon	Mount Lemmon Survey	·	1.8 km	MPC · JPL
305851	2009 EB_{6}	—	March 1, 2009	Kitt Peak	Spacewatch	MAS	830 m	MPC · JPL
305852	2009 EE_{7}	—	March 2, 2009	Mount Lemmon	Mount Lemmon Survey	·	2.2 km	MPC · JPL
305853	2009 EV_{9}	—	March 1, 2009	Kitt Peak	Spacewatch	·	1.0 km	MPC · JPL
305854	2009 EM_{10}	—	March 1, 2009	Kitt Peak	Spacewatch	AEO	1.5 km	MPC · JPL
305855	2009 EB_{11}	—	March 2, 2009	Kitt Peak	Spacewatch	(5)	1.4 km	MPC · JPL
305856	2009 ED_{13}	—	March 15, 2009	Kitt Peak	Spacewatch	HOF	3.9 km	MPC · JPL
305857	2009 EA_{16}	—	March 15, 2009	Kitt Peak	Spacewatch	MAS	800 m	MPC · JPL
305858	2009 EY_{16}	—	March 15, 2009	Kitt Peak	Spacewatch	·	2.4 km	MPC · JPL
305859	2009 EG_{18}	—	March 15, 2009	Kitt Peak	Spacewatch	AGN	1.0 km	MPC · JPL
305860	2009 EB_{20}	—	March 15, 2009	La Sagra	OAM	V	1.0 km	MPC · JPL
305861	2009 EL_{24}	—	March 2, 2009	Kitt Peak	Spacewatch	HOF	3.4 km	MPC · JPL
305862	2009 EV_{24}	—	March 3, 2009	Kitt Peak	Spacewatch	AST	1.9 km	MPC · JPL
305863	2009 EO_{25}	—	March 3, 2009	Mount Lemmon	Mount Lemmon Survey	·	2.1 km	MPC · JPL
305864	2009 ER_{25}	—	March 7, 2009	Mount Lemmon	Mount Lemmon Survey	ADE	2.1 km	MPC · JPL
305865	2009 EW_{25}	—	March 7, 2009	Mount Lemmon	Mount Lemmon Survey	·	2.3 km	MPC · JPL
305866	2009 EZ_{28}	—	March 1, 2009	Kitt Peak	Spacewatch	·	1.9 km	MPC · JPL
305867	2009 EC_{29}	—	March 1, 2009	Kitt Peak	Spacewatch	·	1.8 km	MPC · JPL
305868	2009 EE_{29}	—	March 1, 2009	Mount Lemmon	Mount Lemmon Survey	·	1.6 km	MPC · JPL
305869	2009 EO_{30}	—	March 7, 2009	Mount Lemmon	Mount Lemmon Survey	·	2.0 km	MPC · JPL
305870	2009 EQ_{30}	—	March 15, 2009	Kitt Peak	Spacewatch	·	2.3 km	MPC · JPL
305871	2009 FF_{1}	—	March 17, 2009	Sandlot	G. Hug	·	1.9 km	MPC · JPL
305872	2009 FO_{2}	—	March 18, 2009	Mayhill	Lowe, A.	·	1.4 km	MPC · JPL
305873	2009 FP_{2}	—	March 19, 2009	Mayhill	Lowe, A.	·	2.6 km	MPC · JPL
305874	2009 FW_{2}	—	March 18, 2009	Dauban	Kugel, F.	·	1.9 km	MPC · JPL
305875	2009 FN_{3}	—	March 17, 2009	Dauban	Kugel, F.	NYS	1.4 km	MPC · JPL
305876	2009 FB_{9}	—	March 16, 2009	Mount Lemmon	Mount Lemmon Survey	EUN	1.2 km	MPC · JPL
305877	2009 FK_{9}	—	March 16, 2009	Mount Lemmon	Mount Lemmon Survey	NYS	1.4 km	MPC · JPL
305878	2009 FN_{10}	—	March 18, 2009	Mount Lemmon	Mount Lemmon Survey	MAS	720 m	MPC · JPL
305879	2009 FA_{12}	—	March 17, 2009	Kitt Peak	Spacewatch	·	1.0 km	MPC · JPL
305880	2009 FS_{15}	—	March 17, 2009	Kitt Peak	Spacewatch	HOF	2.7 km	MPC · JPL
305881	2009 FX_{16}	—	March 19, 2009	Mount Lemmon	Mount Lemmon Survey	·	1.9 km	MPC · JPL
305882	2009 FC_{17}	—	March 20, 2009	Sandlot	G. Hug	·	1.2 km	MPC · JPL
305883	2009 FJ_{17}	—	March 16, 2009	La Sagra	OAM	·	2.5 km	MPC · JPL
305884	2009 FM_{17}	—	March 17, 2009	La Sagra	OAM	·	3.2 km	MPC · JPL
305885	2009 FV_{17}	—	March 18, 2009	La Sagra	OAM	·	2.4 km	MPC · JPL
305886	2009 FQ_{18}	—	March 19, 2009	La Sagra	OAM	·	2.7 km	MPC · JPL
305887	2009 FK_{19}	—	March 20, 2009	Hibiscus	Teamo, N.	NYS	1.6 km	MPC · JPL
305888	2009 FW_{19}	—	March 21, 2009	Dauban	Kugel, F.	MAS	820 m	MPC · JPL
305889	2009 FA_{21}	—	March 19, 2009	Kitt Peak	Spacewatch	HNS	1.7 km	MPC · JPL
305890	2009 FL_{21}	—	March 19, 2009	Mount Lemmon	Mount Lemmon Survey	·	1.8 km	MPC · JPL
305891	2009 FW_{22}	—	March 19, 2009	Kitt Peak	Spacewatch	·	1.9 km	MPC · JPL
305892	2009 FO_{24}	—	March 20, 2009	La Sagra	OAM	·	3.0 km	MPC · JPL
305893	2009 FR_{24}	—	March 21, 2009	La Sagra	OAM	HOF · fast	3.8 km	MPC · JPL
305894	2009 FM_{26}	—	March 17, 2009	Kitt Peak	Spacewatch	·	1.2 km	MPC · JPL
305895	2009 FH_{29}	—	March 22, 2009	Catalina	CSS	·	1.5 km	MPC · JPL
305896	2009 FN_{29}	—	March 22, 2009	Mount Lemmon	Mount Lemmon Survey	·	1.5 km	MPC · JPL
305897	2009 FB_{31}	—	March 24, 2009	Socorro	LINEAR	·	2.3 km	MPC · JPL
305898	2009 FG_{31}	—	March 24, 2009	La Sagra	OAM	·	2.5 km	MPC · JPL
305899	2009 FO_{31}	—	March 28, 2009	Mayhill	Lowe, A.	·	5.2 km	MPC · JPL
305900	2009 FP_{34}	—	March 24, 2009	Mount Lemmon	Mount Lemmon Survey	·	4.2 km	MPC · JPL

== 305901–306000 ==
back to top

Designation			Discovery			Properties		Ref
Permanent	Provisional	Named after	Date	Site	Discoverer(s)	Category	Diam.	Ref
305901	2009 FQ_{34}	—	March 24, 2009	Mount Lemmon	Mount Lemmon Survey	·	1.9 km	MPC · JPL
305902	2009 FS_{37}	—	March 24, 2009	Mount Lemmon	Mount Lemmon Survey	AGN	1.4 km	MPC · JPL
305903	2009 FQ_{38}	—	March 16, 2009	La Sagra	OAM	MAS	950 m	MPC · JPL
305904	2009 FN_{39}	—	March 26, 2009	Kitt Peak	Spacewatch	·	2.2 km	MPC · JPL
305905	2009 FS_{41}	—	March 26, 2009	Mount Lemmon	Mount Lemmon Survey	AGN	1.4 km	MPC · JPL
305906	2009 FJ_{42}	—	March 28, 2009	Kitt Peak	Spacewatch	HOF	3.4 km	MPC · JPL
305907	2009 FY_{44}	—	March 25, 2009	Mount Lemmon	Mount Lemmon Survey	WIT	990 m	MPC · JPL
305908	2009 FQ_{45}	—	March 21, 2009	Mount Lemmon	Mount Lemmon Survey	·	2.2 km	MPC · JPL
305909	2009 FB_{47}	—	March 27, 2009	Kitt Peak	Spacewatch	·	2.1 km	MPC · JPL
305910	2009 FB_{50}	—	March 27, 2009	Catalina	CSS	·	2.3 km	MPC · JPL
305911	2009 FU_{52}	—	March 29, 2009	Kitt Peak	Spacewatch	·	1.3 km	MPC · JPL
305912	2009 FH_{55}	—	March 31, 2009	Mount Lemmon	Mount Lemmon Survey	·	1.6 km	MPC · JPL
305913	2009 FM_{57}	—	March 31, 2009	Kitt Peak	Spacewatch	TIR ·	4.2 km	MPC · JPL
305914	2009 FQ_{57}	—	March 28, 2009	Kitt Peak	Spacewatch	·	4.1 km	MPC · JPL
305915	2009 FB_{58}	—	March 19, 2009	Mount Lemmon	Mount Lemmon Survey	·	1.6 km	MPC · JPL
305916	2009 FJ_{60}	—	March 17, 2009	Kitt Peak	Spacewatch	HOF	3.2 km	MPC · JPL
305917	2009 FK_{61}	—	March 21, 2009	Mount Lemmon	Mount Lemmon Survey	KOR	1.2 km	MPC · JPL
305918	2009 FU_{61}	—	March 18, 2009	Mount Lemmon	Mount Lemmon Survey	WIT	1.2 km	MPC · JPL
305919	2009 FW_{61}	—	March 18, 2009	Kitt Peak	Spacewatch	·	2.0 km	MPC · JPL
305920	2009 FJ_{62}	—	March 22, 2009	Mount Lemmon	Mount Lemmon Survey	·	3.4 km	MPC · JPL
305921	2009 FP_{62}	—	March 24, 2009	Mount Lemmon	Mount Lemmon Survey	·	3.2 km	MPC · JPL
305922	2009 FJ_{63}	—	March 28, 2009	Kitt Peak	Spacewatch	EOS	2.1 km	MPC · JPL
305923	2009 FQ_{63}	—	March 29, 2009	Kitt Peak	Spacewatch	·	1.9 km	MPC · JPL
305924	2009 FN_{64}	—	March 31, 2009	Mount Lemmon	Mount Lemmon Survey	EOS	1.9 km	MPC · JPL
305925	2009 FD_{67}	—	March 18, 2009	Kitt Peak	Spacewatch	AGN	1.4 km	MPC · JPL
305926	2009 FJ_{68}	—	March 31, 2009	Kitt Peak	Spacewatch	THM	2.4 km	MPC · JPL
305927	2009 FA_{70}	—	March 18, 2009	Mount Lemmon	Mount Lemmon Survey	·	2.6 km	MPC · JPL
305928	2009 FH_{71}	—	March 31, 2009	Catalina	CSS	·	3.0 km	MPC · JPL
305929	2009 FL_{71}	—	March 31, 2009	Mount Lemmon	Mount Lemmon Survey	EOS	2.2 km	MPC · JPL
305930	2009 FO_{72}	—	March 18, 2009	Catalina	CSS	ADE	3.1 km	MPC · JPL
305931	2009 FE_{73}	—	March 21, 2009	Kitt Peak	Spacewatch	·	1.8 km	MPC · JPL
305932	2009 FV_{73}	—	March 28, 2009	Kitt Peak	Spacewatch	·	2.7 km	MPC · JPL
305933	2009 FK_{76}	—	March 26, 2009	Kitt Peak	Spacewatch	EOS	2.5 km	MPC · JPL
305934	2009 FX_{76}	—	March 16, 2009	Kitt Peak	Spacewatch	·	2.3 km	MPC · JPL
305935	2009 GT	—	April 6, 2009	Hibiscus	Teamo, N.	ADE	3.0 km	MPC · JPL
305936	2009 GF_{3}	—	April 13, 2009	La Sagra	OAM	·	1.9 km	MPC · JPL
305937	2009 GK_{3}	—	April 15, 2009	Siding Spring	SSS	·	1.8 km	MPC · JPL
305938	2009 GZ_{5}	—	April 1, 2009	Kitt Peak	Spacewatch	·	2.0 km	MPC · JPL
305939	2009 HM	—	April 18, 2009	Sierra Stars	Tozzi, F.	·	1.5 km	MPC · JPL
305940	2009 HT	—	April 16, 2009	Catalina	CSS	·	5.5 km	MPC · JPL
305941	2009 HC_{2}	—	April 17, 2009	Catalina	CSS	·	1.7 km	MPC · JPL
305942	2009 HE_{13}	—	April 17, 2009	Catalina	CSS	·	1.8 km	MPC · JPL
305943	2009 HK_{13}	—	April 17, 2009	Kitt Peak	Spacewatch	HOF	2.8 km	MPC · JPL
305944	2009 HA_{14}	—	April 17, 2009	Kitt Peak	Spacewatch	·	3.4 km	MPC · JPL
305945	2009 HX_{16}	—	April 18, 2009	Kitt Peak	Spacewatch	·	1.3 km	MPC · JPL
305946	2009 HJ_{17}	—	April 18, 2009	Kitt Peak	Spacewatch	EOS	1.6 km	MPC · JPL
305947	2009 HH_{18}	—	April 18, 2009	Mount Lemmon	Mount Lemmon Survey	·	2.8 km	MPC · JPL
305948	2009 HL_{18}	—	April 18, 2009	Catalina	CSS	·	3.2 km	MPC · JPL
305949	2009 HT_{21}	—	April 16, 2009	Catalina	CSS	·	4.3 km	MPC · JPL
305950	2009 HL_{24}	—	April 17, 2009	Kitt Peak	Spacewatch	·	3.4 km	MPC · JPL
305951	2009 HG_{26}	—	April 18, 2009	Kitt Peak	Spacewatch	·	4.2 km	MPC · JPL
305952	2009 HU_{30}	—	April 19, 2009	Kitt Peak	Spacewatch	·	1.8 km	MPC · JPL
305953 Josiedubey	2009 HV_{36}	Josiedubey	April 20, 2009	Mayhill	Falla, N.	·	2.0 km	MPC · JPL
305954	2009 HQ_{39}	—	April 18, 2009	Kitt Peak	Spacewatch	·	1.5 km	MPC · JPL
305955	2009 HY_{40}	—	April 20, 2009	Kitt Peak	Spacewatch	·	2.0 km	MPC · JPL
305956	2009 HJ_{43}	—	April 20, 2009	Kitt Peak	Spacewatch	·	2.4 km	MPC · JPL
305957	2009 HK_{43}	—	April 20, 2009	Kitt Peak	Spacewatch	·	1.3 km	MPC · JPL
305958	2009 HE_{45}	—	April 21, 2009	La Sagra	OAM	·	4.8 km	MPC · JPL
305959	2009 HH_{45}	—	April 21, 2009	La Sagra	OAM	·	1.9 km	MPC · JPL
305960	2009 HT_{45}	—	April 21, 2009	La Sagra	OAM	·	4.8 km	MPC · JPL
305961	2009 HZ_{46}	—	April 17, 2009	Kitt Peak	Spacewatch	·	4.3 km	MPC · JPL
305962	2009 HG_{50}	—	April 21, 2009	Kitt Peak	Spacewatch	·	1.2 km	MPC · JPL
305963	2009 HS_{53}	—	April 20, 2009	Kitt Peak	Spacewatch	·	4.0 km	MPC · JPL
305964	2009 HG_{55}	—	April 21, 2009	Mount Lemmon	Mount Lemmon Survey	·	1.6 km	MPC · JPL
305965	2009 HJ_{57}	—	April 22, 2009	La Sagra	OAM	·	3.8 km	MPC · JPL
305966	2009 HR_{58}	—	April 23, 2009	Kachina	Hobart, J.	·	2.6 km	MPC · JPL
305967	2009 HR_{60}	—	April 19, 2009	Mount Lemmon	Mount Lemmon Survey	·	2.0 km	MPC · JPL
305968	2009 HF_{69}	—	April 22, 2009	Mount Lemmon	Mount Lemmon Survey	BRA	2.2 km	MPC · JPL
305969	2009 HD_{70}	—	April 22, 2009	Mount Lemmon	Mount Lemmon Survey	·	3.8 km	MPC · JPL
305970	2009 HN_{71}	—	April 22, 2009	Mount Lemmon	Mount Lemmon Survey	·	2.1 km	MPC · JPL
305971	2009 HM_{75}	—	April 28, 2009	Catalina	CSS	EOS	2.5 km	MPC · JPL
305972	2009 HG_{76}	—	April 24, 2009	Mount Lemmon	Mount Lemmon Survey	·	2.4 km	MPC · JPL
305973	2009 HH_{80}	—	March 15, 2009	Kitt Peak	Spacewatch	T_{j} (2.94)	6.0 km	MPC · JPL
305974	2009 HS_{85}	—	April 29, 2009	Kitt Peak	Spacewatch	·	1.6 km	MPC · JPL
305975	2009 HZ_{85}	—	April 29, 2009	Kitt Peak	Spacewatch	·	1.8 km	MPC · JPL
305976	2009 HB_{89}	—	April 24, 2009	Cerro Burek	Burek, Cerro	·	2.4 km	MPC · JPL
305977	2009 HK_{96}	—	April 22, 2009	Mount Lemmon	Mount Lemmon Survey	·	2.4 km	MPC · JPL
305978	2009 HL_{99}	—	April 21, 2009	Mount Lemmon	Mount Lemmon Survey	EOS	2.5 km	MPC · JPL
305979	2009 HJ_{100}	—	April 27, 2009	Purple Mountain	PMO NEO Survey Program	·	3.2 km	MPC · JPL
305980	2009 HV_{101}	—	April 18, 2009	Kitt Peak	Spacewatch	·	4.8 km	MPC · JPL
305981	2009 HC_{103}	—	April 17, 2009	Kitt Peak	Spacewatch	EOS	2.5 km	MPC · JPL
305982	2009 HM_{103}	—	April 18, 2009	Mount Lemmon	Mount Lemmon Survey	·	1.8 km	MPC · JPL
305983	2009 HF_{104}	—	April 22, 2009	Kitt Peak	Spacewatch	·	2.0 km	MPC · JPL
305984	2009 HN_{104}	—	April 28, 2009	Kitt Peak	Spacewatch	·	1.7 km	MPC · JPL
305985	2009 HB_{105}	—	April 19, 2009	Kitt Peak	Spacewatch	EOS	2.1 km	MPC · JPL
305986	2009 HF_{105}	—	April 20, 2009	Mount Lemmon	Mount Lemmon Survey	EOS	2.1 km	MPC · JPL
305987	2009 JD_{3}	—	May 13, 2009	Kitt Peak	Spacewatch	·	4.4 km	MPC · JPL
305988	2009 JN_{4}	—	May 12, 2009	Catalina	CSS	·	2.8 km	MPC · JPL
305989	2009 JK_{6}	—	May 13, 2009	Kitt Peak	Spacewatch	·	5.3 km	MPC · JPL
305990	2009 JR_{8}	—	May 13, 2009	Kitt Peak	Spacewatch	·	1.6 km	MPC · JPL
305991	2009 JY_{8}	—	May 13, 2009	Kitt Peak	Spacewatch	GEF	1.4 km	MPC · JPL
305992	2009 JN_{12}	—	May 15, 2009	La Sagra	OAM	·	1.8 km	MPC · JPL
305993	2009 KJ_{3}	—	May 24, 2009	La Sagra	OAM	·	2.1 km	MPC · JPL
305994	2009 KG_{7}	—	May 18, 2009	La Sagra	OAM	·	2.6 km	MPC · JPL
305995	2009 KP_{12}	—	May 25, 2009	Kitt Peak	Spacewatch	·	3.9 km	MPC · JPL
305996	2009 KB_{14}	—	May 26, 2009	Kitt Peak	Spacewatch	·	4.0 km	MPC · JPL
305997	2009 KX_{15}	—	May 26, 2009	Kitt Peak	Spacewatch	·	3.1 km	MPC · JPL
305998	2009 KH_{17}	—	May 26, 2009	Kitt Peak	Spacewatch	·	3.6 km	MPC · JPL
305999	2009 SH_{362}	—	June 6, 2005	Siding Spring	SSS	·	1.2 km	MPC · JPL
306000	2009 TS_{21}	—	September 23, 2009	Mount Lemmon	Mount Lemmon Survey	L4	10 km	MPC · JPL

back to top

== See also ==
- Meanings of minor-planet names: 305001–306000
