= Meanings of minor-planet names: 305001–306000 =

As minor planet discoveries are confirmed, they are given a permanent number by the IAU's Minor Planet Center (MPC), and the discoverers can then submit names for them, following the IAU's naming conventions. The list below concerns those minor planets in the specified number-range that have received names, and explains the meanings of those names.

Official naming citations of newly named small Solar System bodies are approved and published in a bulletin by IAU's Working Group for Small Bodies Nomenclature (WGSBN). Before May 2021, citations were published in MPC's Minor Planet Circulars for many decades. Recent citations can also be found on the JPL Small-Body Database (SBDB). Until his death in 2016, German astronomer Lutz D. Schmadel compiled these citations into the Dictionary of Minor Planet Names (DMP) and regularly updated the collection.

Based on Paul Herget's The Names of the Minor Planets, Schmadel also researched the unclear origin of numerous asteroids, most of which had been named prior to World War II. This article incorporates text from this source, which is in the public domain: SBDB New namings may only be added to this list below after official publication as the preannouncement of names is condemned. The WGSBN publishes a comprehensive guideline for the naming rules of non-cometary small Solar System bodies.

== 305001–305100 ==
Named minor planet	Provisional	This minor planet was named for...	Ref · Catalog
There are no named minor planets in this number range

== 305101–305200 ==
back to top

Named minor planet	Provisional	This minor planet was named for...	Ref · Catalog
305181 Donelaitis	2007 VR_{302}	Kristijonas Donelaitis (1714–1780), a Lutheran pastor who is considered one of the greatest Lithuanian poets.	JPL · 305181

== 305201–305300 ==
back to top

Named minor planet	Provisional	This minor planet was named for...	Ref · Catalog
305238 Maxuehui	2007 XZ_{25}	Xue-Hui Ma (born 1971) is the Director of Ken-Ting Observatory (KTO) in Taiwan. Ma has provided training courses in astronomical observation to more than 2 000 students since the establishment of KTO in the year of 2000. Under his supervision, KTO has become the best educational base in Taiwan for advanced observing technique in astronomy.	IAU · 305238
305254 Moron	2007 YN_{3}	Moron, a mountain of the Jura, located north of Malleray in the canton of Bern, Switzerland.	JPL · 305254
305263 Krasznahorkai	2007 YQ_{29}	László Krasznahorkai, Hungarian Nobel Prize laureate writer, novelist and screenwriter.	IAU · 305263
305264 Tarrbéla	2007 YR_{29}	Béla Tarr, Hungarian film director, screenwriter and producer.	IAU · 305264
305287 Olegyankov	2008 AF_{2}	Oleg Yankov (born 1968), a Russian philanthropist.	JPL · 305287

== 305301–305400 ==
back to top

Named minor planet	Provisional	This minor planet was named for...	Ref · Catalog
305344 Williamcolgrove	2008 AB_{122}	William Gladstone Colgrove, Canadian amateur astronomer.	IAU · 305344

== 305401–305500 ==
back to top

Named minor planet	Provisional	This minor planet was named for...	Ref · Catalog
There are no named minor planets in this number range

== 305501–305600 ==
back to top

Named minor planet	Provisional	This minor planet was named for...	Ref · Catalog
There are no named minor planets in this number range

== 305601–305700 ==
back to top

Named minor planet	Provisional	This minor planet was named for...	Ref · Catalog
305660 Romyhaag	2009 BJ_{73}	Romy Haag (born 1951), a singer, actress and show star who started her career at the famous "Alcazar" in Paris.	JPL · 305660
305661 Joejackson	2009 BN73	Joe Jackson (born 1954, David Ian Jackson), a British musician, singer and songwriter	JPL · 305661

== 305701–305800 ==
back to top

Named minor planet	Provisional	This minor planet was named for...	Ref · Catalog
305776 Susinnogabriele	2009 DE_{46}	Gabriele Susinno, Italian physicist trained in astrophysics.	IAU · 305776

== 305801–305900 ==
back to top

Named minor planet	Provisional	This minor planet was named for...	Ref · Catalog
There are no named minor planets in this number range

== 305901–306000 ==
back to top

Named minor planet	Provisional	This minor planet was named for...	Ref · Catalog
305953 Josiedubey	2009 HV_{36}	Josie Elizabeth Chloe Jayne Dubey (born 1994), granddaughter of British discoverer Norman Falla	JPL · 305953

back to top

Preceded by 304,001–305,000	Meanings of minor-planet names List of minor planets: 305,001–306,000	Succeeded by 306,001–307,000
