= List of minor planets: 304001–305000 =

The following is a partial list of minor planets, running from minor-planet number 304001 through 305000, inclusive. The primary data for this and other partial lists is based on JPL's "Small-Body Orbital Elements" and data available from the Minor Planet Center. Critical list information is also provided by the MPC, unless otherwise specified from Lowell Observatory. A detailed description of the table's columns and additional sources are given on the main page including a complete list of every page in this series, and a statistical break-up on the dynamical classification of minor planets.

Also see the summary list of all named bodies in numerical and alphabetical order, and the corresponding naming citations for the number range of this particular list. New namings may only be added to this list after official publication, as the preannouncement of names is condemned by the Working Group for Small Bodies Nomenclature of the International Astronomical Union.

Near-Earth obj.	MBA (inner)	MBA (outer)	Centaur
Mars-crosser	MBA (middle)	Jupiter trojan	Trans-Neptunian obj.
Unclassified

== 304001–304100 ==
Designation			Discovery			Properties		Ref
Permanent	Provisional	Named after	Date	Site	Discoverer(s)	Category	Diam.	Ref
304001	2006 BJ_{241}	—	January 31, 2006	Kitt Peak	Spacewatch	·	690 m	MPC · JPL
304002	2006 BZ_{260}	—	January 31, 2006	Mount Lemmon	Mount Lemmon Survey	(2076)	1.6 km	MPC · JPL
304003	2006 BM_{264}	—	January 31, 2006	Kitt Peak	Spacewatch	·	720 m	MPC · JPL
304004	2006 BQ_{269}	—	January 28, 2006	Anderson Mesa	LONEOS	·	900 m	MPC · JPL
304005	2006 CZ_{2}	—	February 1, 2006	Mount Lemmon	Mount Lemmon Survey	·	710 m	MPC · JPL
304006	2006 CR_{15}	—	February 1, 2006	Kitt Peak	Spacewatch	·	930 m	MPC · JPL
304007	2006 CE_{22}	—	February 1, 2006	Mount Lemmon	Mount Lemmon Survey	·	1.4 km	MPC · JPL
304008	2006 CY_{26}	—	February 2, 2006	Kitt Peak	Spacewatch	·	830 m	MPC · JPL
304009	2006 CQ_{27}	—	February 2, 2006	Kitt Peak	Spacewatch	·	910 m	MPC · JPL
304010	2006 CK_{40}	—	February 2, 2006	Mount Lemmon	Mount Lemmon Survey	V	710 m	MPC · JPL
304011	2006 CQ_{61}	—	February 3, 2006	Anderson Mesa	LONEOS	·	1.0 km	MPC · JPL
304012	2006 DA_{2}	—	February 20, 2006	Kitt Peak	Spacewatch	·	1.1 km	MPC · JPL
304013	2006 DV_{5}	—	February 20, 2006	Catalina	CSS	·	2.7 km	MPC · JPL
304014	2006 DL_{8}	—	February 21, 2006	Mount Lemmon	Mount Lemmon Survey	·	1.2 km	MPC · JPL
304015	2006 DO_{10}	—	February 20, 2006	Catalina	CSS	·	900 m	MPC · JPL
304016	2006 DB_{11}	—	February 21, 2006	Catalina	CSS	V	1.0 km	MPC · JPL
304017	2006 DA_{23}	—	February 20, 2006	Kitt Peak	Spacewatch	MAS	990 m	MPC · JPL
304018	2006 DH_{27}	—	February 20, 2006	Kitt Peak	Spacewatch	V	700 m	MPC · JPL
304019	2006 DH_{33}	—	February 20, 2006	Kitt Peak	Spacewatch	·	1.1 km	MPC · JPL
304020	2006 DN_{37}	—	February 20, 2006	Mount Lemmon	Mount Lemmon Survey	·	1.5 km	MPC · JPL
304021	2006 DS_{41}	—	February 23, 2006	Kitt Peak	Spacewatch	NYS	1.5 km	MPC · JPL
304022	2006 DP_{45}	—	February 20, 2006	Mount Lemmon	Mount Lemmon Survey	·	840 m	MPC · JPL
304023	2006 DC_{47}	—	February 20, 2006	Mount Lemmon	Mount Lemmon Survey	·	1.5 km	MPC · JPL
304024	2006 DF_{55}	—	February 24, 2006	Socorro	LINEAR	·	1.5 km	MPC · JPL
304025	2006 DR_{59}	—	February 24, 2006	Mount Lemmon	Mount Lemmon Survey	V	710 m	MPC · JPL
304026	2006 DK_{67}	—	February 22, 2006	Catalina	CSS	·	1.7 km	MPC · JPL
304027	2006 DM_{69}	—	February 20, 2006	Kitt Peak	Spacewatch	·	1.2 km	MPC · JPL
304028	2006 DO_{69}	—	February 20, 2006	Kitt Peak	Spacewatch	·	1.7 km	MPC · JPL
304029	2006 DV_{73}	—	February 23, 2006	Kitt Peak	Spacewatch	NYS	1.2 km	MPC · JPL
304030	2006 DA_{74}	—	February 23, 2006	Kitt Peak	Spacewatch	·	890 m	MPC · JPL
304031	2006 DM_{81}	—	February 24, 2006	Kitt Peak	Spacewatch	·	1.2 km	MPC · JPL
304032	2006 DR_{89}	—	February 24, 2006	Mount Lemmon	Mount Lemmon Survey	·	770 m	MPC · JPL
304033	2006 DX_{89}	—	February 24, 2006	Kitt Peak	Spacewatch	MAS	780 m	MPC · JPL
304034	2006 DS_{90}	—	February 24, 2006	Kitt Peak	Spacewatch	·	1.4 km	MPC · JPL
304035	2006 DY_{92}	—	February 24, 2006	Kitt Peak	Spacewatch	·	1.6 km	MPC · JPL
304036	2006 DX_{101}	—	February 25, 2006	Kitt Peak	Spacewatch	·	1.2 km	MPC · JPL
304037	2006 DO_{104}	—	February 25, 2006	Kitt Peak	Spacewatch	·	1.3 km	MPC · JPL
304038	2006 DE_{115}	—	February 27, 2006	Kitt Peak	Spacewatch	·	1.6 km	MPC · JPL
304039	2006 DY_{119}	—	February 20, 2006	Catalina	CSS	·	950 m	MPC · JPL
304040	2006 DH_{134}	—	February 25, 2006	Kitt Peak	Spacewatch	·	1.1 km	MPC · JPL
304041	2006 DL_{134}	—	February 25, 2006	Kitt Peak	Spacewatch	·	690 m	MPC · JPL
304042	2006 DR_{140}	—	February 25, 2006	Kitt Peak	Spacewatch	·	1.5 km	MPC · JPL
304043	2006 DN_{150}	—	February 25, 2006	Kitt Peak	Spacewatch	·	1.2 km	MPC · JPL
304044	2006 DK_{153}	—	February 25, 2006	Kitt Peak	Spacewatch	·	690 m	MPC · JPL
304045	2006 DT_{166}	—	February 27, 2006	Kitt Peak	Spacewatch	·	1.4 km	MPC · JPL
304046	2006 DR_{189}	—	February 27, 2006	Kitt Peak	Spacewatch	·	1.2 km	MPC · JPL
304047	2006 DL_{194}	—	February 28, 2006	Mount Lemmon	Mount Lemmon Survey	NYS	1.3 km	MPC · JPL
304048	2006 DO_{216}	—	February 20, 2006	Kitt Peak	Spacewatch	·	870 m	MPC · JPL
304049	2006 ED_{19}	—	March 2, 2006	Kitt Peak	Spacewatch	·	770 m	MPC · JPL
304050	2006 EQ_{19}	—	March 2, 2006	Kitt Peak	Spacewatch	·	840 m	MPC · JPL
304051	2006 ES_{33}	—	March 3, 2006	Catalina	CSS	·	830 m	MPC · JPL
304052	2006 EV_{33}	—	March 3, 2006	Catalina	CSS	·	950 m	MPC · JPL
304053	2006 EX_{33}	—	March 3, 2006	Catalina	CSS	·	1.6 km	MPC · JPL
304054	2006 EB_{38}	—	March 4, 2006	Mount Lemmon	Mount Lemmon Survey	·	670 m	MPC · JPL
304055	2006 EM_{48}	—	March 4, 2006	Kitt Peak	Spacewatch	·	1.7 km	MPC · JPL
304056	2006 EG_{65}	—	March 5, 2006	Kitt Peak	Spacewatch	NYS	1.4 km	MPC · JPL
304057	2006 EA_{66}	—	March 5, 2006	Kitt Peak	Spacewatch	·	1.9 km	MPC · JPL
304058	2006 FH_{3}	—	March 23, 2006	Kitt Peak	Spacewatch	·	960 m	MPC · JPL
304059	2006 FX_{3}	—	March 23, 2006	Kitt Peak	Spacewatch	·	1.3 km	MPC · JPL
304060	2006 FQ_{12}	—	March 23, 2006	Kitt Peak	Spacewatch	MAS	880 m	MPC · JPL
304061	2006 FB_{13}	—	March 23, 2006	Kitt Peak	Spacewatch	·	1.3 km	MPC · JPL
304062	2006 FW_{15}	—	March 23, 2006	Mount Lemmon	Mount Lemmon Survey	NYS	1.0 km	MPC · JPL
304063	2006 FY_{16}	—	March 23, 2006	Mount Lemmon	Mount Lemmon Survey	·	1.0 km	MPC · JPL
304064	2006 FM_{22}	—	March 24, 2006	Mount Lemmon	Mount Lemmon Survey	·	1.6 km	MPC · JPL
304065	2006 FM_{23}	—	March 24, 2006	Kitt Peak	Spacewatch	NYS	1.2 km	MPC · JPL
304066	2006 FN_{24}	—	March 24, 2006	Kitt Peak	Spacewatch	·	1.2 km	MPC · JPL
304067	2006 FT_{34}	—	March 25, 2006	Palomar	NEAT	·	1.1 km	MPC · JPL
304068	2006 FB_{38}	—	March 23, 2006	Kitt Peak	Spacewatch	·	1.4 km	MPC · JPL
304069	2006 FR_{47}	—	March 24, 2006	Socorro	LINEAR	·	900 m	MPC · JPL
304070	2006 FO_{49}	—	March 25, 2006	Catalina	CSS	PHO	3.1 km	MPC · JPL
304071	2006 FS_{53}	—	March 25, 2006	Kitt Peak	Spacewatch	NYS	1.5 km	MPC · JPL
304072	2006 GQ_{15}	—	April 2, 2006	Kitt Peak	Spacewatch	·	710 m	MPC · JPL
304073	2006 GK_{21}	—	April 2, 2006	Mount Lemmon	Mount Lemmon Survey	·	1.3 km	MPC · JPL
304074	2006 GR_{24}	—	April 2, 2006	Kitt Peak	Spacewatch	·	980 m	MPC · JPL
304075	2006 GT_{25}	—	April 2, 2006	Kitt Peak	Spacewatch	·	1.2 km	MPC · JPL
304076	2006 GP_{30}	—	April 2, 2006	Mount Lemmon	Mount Lemmon Survey	·	1.2 km	MPC · JPL
304077	2006 GO_{31}	—	April 2, 2006	Kitt Peak	Spacewatch	·	1.5 km	MPC · JPL
304078	2006 GW_{35}	—	April 7, 2006	Catalina	CSS	V	1.1 km	MPC · JPL
304079	2006 GQ_{37}	—	April 9, 2006	Kitt Peak	Spacewatch	·	1.5 km	MPC · JPL
304080	2006 GN_{38}	—	April 4, 2006	Črni Vrh	Matičič, S.	·	1.3 km	MPC · JPL
304081	2006 GK_{40}	—	April 6, 2006	Catalina	CSS	PHO	1.1 km	MPC · JPL
304082	2006 GL_{40}	—	April 6, 2006	Catalina	CSS	·	1.9 km	MPC · JPL
304083	2006 GW_{47}	—	April 9, 2006	Kitt Peak	Spacewatch	NYS	1.2 km	MPC · JPL
304084	2006 GL_{54}	—	April 2, 2006	Mount Lemmon	Mount Lemmon Survey	·	1.0 km	MPC · JPL
304085	2006 GP_{54}	—	April 7, 2006	Kitt Peak	Spacewatch	MAS	920 m	MPC · JPL
304086	2006 HZ_{1}	—	April 18, 2006	Palomar	NEAT	V	940 m	MPC · JPL
304087	2006 HP_{3}	—	April 18, 2006	Anderson Mesa	LONEOS	·	850 m	MPC · JPL
304088	2006 HX_{5}	—	April 20, 2006	Kitt Peak	Spacewatch	AMO	530 m	MPC · JPL
304089	2006 HQ_{18}	—	April 21, 2006	Mount Lemmon	Mount Lemmon Survey	·	1.6 km	MPC · JPL
304090	2006 HG_{19}	—	April 18, 2006	Kitt Peak	Spacewatch	·	1.3 km	MPC · JPL
304091	2006 HV_{20}	—	April 19, 2006	Mount Lemmon	Mount Lemmon Survey	·	1.1 km	MPC · JPL
304092	2006 HR_{28}	—	April 20, 2006	Kitt Peak	Spacewatch	·	1.8 km	MPC · JPL
304093	2006 HM_{29}	—	April 23, 2006	Catalina	CSS	·	2.1 km	MPC · JPL
304094	2006 HV_{32}	—	April 19, 2006	Anderson Mesa	LONEOS	·	1.9 km	MPC · JPL
304095	2006 HT_{36}	—	April 20, 2006	Mount Lemmon	Mount Lemmon Survey	·	1.3 km	MPC · JPL
304096	2006 HF_{50}	—	April 26, 2006	Catalina	CSS	·	1.7 km	MPC · JPL
304097	2006 HK_{50}	—	April 26, 2006	Mount Lemmon	Mount Lemmon Survey	NYS	1.2 km	MPC · JPL
304098	2006 HT_{51}	—	April 26, 2006	Reedy Creek	J. Broughton	·	3.1 km	MPC · JPL
304099	2006 HG_{57}	—	April 24, 2006	Socorro	LINEAR	NYS	1.6 km	MPC · JPL
304100	2006 HU_{57}	—	April 30, 2006	Kitt Peak	Spacewatch	PHO	2.4 km	MPC · JPL

== 304101–304200 ==
back to top

Designation			Discovery			Properties		Ref
Permanent	Provisional	Named after	Date	Site	Discoverer(s)	Category	Diam.	Ref
304101	2006 HQ_{59}	—	April 24, 2006	Socorro	LINEAR	·	1.7 km	MPC · JPL
304102	2006 HK_{65}	—	April 24, 2006	Kitt Peak	Spacewatch	·	1.4 km	MPC · JPL
304103	2006 HU_{71}	—	April 25, 2006	Kitt Peak	Spacewatch	·	1.5 km	MPC · JPL
304104	2006 HD_{73}	—	April 25, 2006	Kitt Peak	Spacewatch	(2076)	1.2 km	MPC · JPL
304105	2006 HF_{78}	—	April 26, 2006	Kitt Peak	Spacewatch	·	1.3 km	MPC · JPL
304106	2006 HX_{91}	—	April 29, 2006	Kitt Peak	Spacewatch	·	1.9 km	MPC · JPL
304107	2006 HW_{93}	—	April 29, 2006	Kitt Peak	Spacewatch	·	2.3 km	MPC · JPL
304108	2006 HO_{96}	—	April 30, 2006	Kitt Peak	Spacewatch	·	1.2 km	MPC · JPL
304109	2006 HA_{100}	—	April 30, 2006	Kitt Peak	Spacewatch	·	1.1 km	MPC · JPL
304110	2006 HQ_{108}	—	April 30, 2006	Catalina	CSS	·	2.0 km	MPC · JPL
304111	2006 HJ_{118}	—	April 30, 2006	Kitt Peak	Spacewatch	V	670 m	MPC · JPL
304112	2006 HC_{120}	—	April 30, 2006	Kitt Peak	Spacewatch	·	1.3 km	MPC · JPL
304113	2006 JK_{5}	—	May 3, 2006	Mount Lemmon	Mount Lemmon Survey	V	940 m	MPC · JPL
304114	2006 JP_{22}	—	May 2, 2006	Kitt Peak	Spacewatch	MAR	1.1 km	MPC · JPL
304115	2006 JY_{23}	—	May 3, 2006	Mount Lemmon	Mount Lemmon Survey	·	1.8 km	MPC · JPL
304116	2006 JF_{24}	—	May 4, 2006	Mount Lemmon	Mount Lemmon Survey	·	1.2 km	MPC · JPL
304117	2006 JC_{32}	—	May 3, 2006	Kitt Peak	Spacewatch	·	1.4 km	MPC · JPL
304118	2006 JM_{37}	—	May 5, 2006	Kitt Peak	Spacewatch	·	1.5 km	MPC · JPL
304119	2006 JD_{40}	—	May 6, 2006	Kitt Peak	Spacewatch	·	3.1 km	MPC · JPL
304120	2006 JG_{45}	—	May 7, 2006	Mount Lemmon	Mount Lemmon Survey	EUN	1.1 km	MPC · JPL
304121	2006 JD_{55}	—	May 9, 2006	Mount Lemmon	Mount Lemmon Survey	·	3.5 km	MPC · JPL
304122 Ameliawehlau	2006 JY_{73}	Ameliawehlau	May 1, 2006	Mauna Kea	P. A. Wiegert	MAS	710 m	MPC · JPL
304123	2006 KT_{2}	—	May 18, 2006	Palomar	NEAT	·	1.2 km	MPC · JPL
304124	2006 KM_{5}	—	May 19, 2006	Mount Lemmon	Mount Lemmon Survey	·	1.5 km	MPC · JPL
304125	2006 KU_{7}	—	May 19, 2006	Mount Lemmon	Mount Lemmon Survey	V	800 m	MPC · JPL
304126	2006 KG_{13}	—	May 20, 2006	Kitt Peak	Spacewatch	·	2.2 km	MPC · JPL
304127	2006 KK_{14}	—	May 20, 2006	Palomar	NEAT	·	1.5 km	MPC · JPL
304128	2006 KD_{15}	—	May 20, 2006	Catalina	CSS	·	1.6 km	MPC · JPL
304129	2006 KY_{36}	—	May 21, 2006	Mount Lemmon	Mount Lemmon Survey	·	1.1 km	MPC · JPL
304130	2006 KJ_{40}	—	May 18, 2006	Palomar	NEAT	JUN	1.5 km	MPC · JPL
304131	2006 KL_{42}	—	May 20, 2006	Mount Lemmon	Mount Lemmon Survey	·	1.2 km	MPC · JPL
304132	2006 KA_{47}	—	May 21, 2006	Mount Lemmon	Mount Lemmon Survey	·	1.1 km	MPC · JPL
304133	2006 KC_{51}	—	May 21, 2006	Mount Lemmon	Mount Lemmon Survey	·	1.8 km	MPC · JPL
304134	2006 KB_{64}	—	May 23, 2006	Kitt Peak	Spacewatch	·	1.1 km	MPC · JPL
304135	2006 KE_{64}	—	May 23, 2006	Kitt Peak	Spacewatch	·	1.2 km	MPC · JPL
304136	2006 KO_{64}	—	May 23, 2006	Mount Lemmon	Mount Lemmon Survey	·	2.2 km	MPC · JPL
304137	2006 KP_{70}	—	May 22, 2006	Kitt Peak	Spacewatch	·	1.4 km	MPC · JPL
304138	2006 KR_{77}	—	May 24, 2006	Palomar	NEAT	·	1.8 km	MPC · JPL
304139	2006 KT_{77}	—	May 24, 2006	Palomar	NEAT	·	2.5 km	MPC · JPL
304140	2006 KU_{79}	—	May 25, 2006	Mount Lemmon	Mount Lemmon Survey	ADE	2.9 km	MPC · JPL
304141	2006 KP_{80}	—	May 25, 2006	Mount Lemmon	Mount Lemmon Survey	·	1.3 km	MPC · JPL
304142	2006 KW_{81}	—	May 25, 2006	Mount Lemmon	Mount Lemmon Survey	·	2.0 km	MPC · JPL
304143	2006 KJ_{84}	—	May 22, 2006	Kitt Peak	Spacewatch	(5)	1.3 km	MPC · JPL
304144	2006 KV_{92}	—	May 25, 2006	Kitt Peak	Spacewatch	·	1.4 km	MPC · JPL
304145	2006 KF_{99}	—	May 26, 2006	Mount Lemmon	Mount Lemmon Survey	·	1.3 km	MPC · JPL
304146	2006 KH_{102}	—	May 27, 2006	Kitt Peak	Spacewatch	·	2.5 km	MPC · JPL
304147	2006 KR_{115}	—	May 29, 2006	Kitt Peak	Spacewatch	·	880 m	MPC · JPL
304148	2006 KB_{122}	—	May 26, 2006	Siding Spring	SSS	·	2.3 km	MPC · JPL
304149	2006 KM_{143}	—	May 29, 2006	Siding Spring	SSS	·	3.7 km	MPC · JPL
304150	2006 LL_{2}	—	June 15, 2006	Kitt Peak	Spacewatch	EUN	1.2 km	MPC · JPL
304151	2006 ME_{14}	—	June 17, 2006	Siding Spring	SSS	·	2.2 km	MPC · JPL
304152	2006 NH	—	July 3, 2006	Hibiscus	S. F. Hönig	·	2.0 km	MPC · JPL
304153	2006 OU_{10}	—	July 25, 2006	Mount Lemmon	Mount Lemmon Survey	AMO +1km	2.1 km	MPC · JPL
304154	2006 OW_{17}	—	July 18, 2006	Siding Spring	SSS	JUN	1.3 km	MPC · JPL
304155	2006 OO_{18}	—	July 20, 2006	Siding Spring	SSS	(194)	4.0 km	MPC · JPL
304156	2006 OU_{19}	—	July 20, 2006	Siding Spring	SSS	·	3.4 km	MPC · JPL
304157	2006 OT_{20}	—	July 21, 2006	Mount Lemmon	Mount Lemmon Survey	·	2.2 km	MPC · JPL
304158	2006 OV_{21}	—	July 18, 2006	Siding Spring	SSS	CLO	3.2 km	MPC · JPL
304159	2006 PF	—	August 2, 2006	Pla D'Arguines	R. Ferrando	·	2.6 km	MPC · JPL
304160	2006 PG_{1}	—	August 13, 2006	Palomar	NEAT	H	690 m	MPC · JPL
304161	2006 PE_{3}	—	August 12, 2006	Palomar	NEAT	·	2.5 km	MPC · JPL
304162	2006 PS_{6}	—	August 12, 2006	Palomar	NEAT	·	2.1 km	MPC · JPL
304163	2006 PQ_{7}	—	August 12, 2006	Palomar	NEAT	·	2.2 km	MPC · JPL
304164	2006 PN_{10}	—	August 13, 2006	Palomar	NEAT	·	2.2 km	MPC · JPL
304165	2006 PG_{12}	—	August 13, 2006	Palomar	NEAT	·	2.4 km	MPC · JPL
304166	2006 PL_{15}	—	August 15, 2006	Palomar	NEAT	AGN	1.5 km	MPC · JPL
304167	2006 PX_{16}	—	August 15, 2006	Palomar	NEAT	·	2.9 km	MPC · JPL
304168	2006 PK_{20}	—	August 14, 2006	Siding Spring	SSS	TIN	2.0 km	MPC · JPL
304169	2006 PW_{25}	—	August 13, 2006	Palomar	NEAT	·	2.2 km	MPC · JPL
304170	2006 PP_{37}	—	August 13, 2006	Palomar	NEAT	·	1.3 km	MPC · JPL
304171	2006 PF_{39}	—	August 14, 2006	Palomar	NEAT	·	2.8 km	MPC · JPL
304172	2006 PX_{40}	—	August 14, 2006	Palomar	NEAT	·	3.1 km	MPC · JPL
304173	2006 PN_{43}	—	August 15, 2006	Lulin	Lin, C.-S., Q. Ye	GEF	1.5 km	MPC · JPL
304174	2006 PQ_{43}	—	August 6, 2006	Lulin	Lin, C.-S., Q. Ye	·	2.0 km	MPC · JPL
304175	2006 QT_{3}	—	August 18, 2006	Kitt Peak	Spacewatch	·	1.9 km	MPC · JPL
304176	2006 QP_{5}	—	August 16, 2006	Reedy Creek	J. Broughton	·	2.6 km	MPC · JPL
304177	2006 QK_{9}	—	August 19, 2006	Kitt Peak	Spacewatch	·	3.0 km	MPC · JPL
304178	2006 QH_{17}	—	August 17, 2006	Palomar	NEAT	RAF	1.1 km	MPC · JPL
304179	2006 QC_{18}	—	August 17, 2006	Palomar	NEAT	·	2.2 km	MPC · JPL
304180	2006 QA_{26}	—	August 19, 2006	Anderson Mesa	LONEOS	·	2.9 km	MPC · JPL
304181	2006 QG_{34}	—	August 19, 2006	Kitt Peak	Spacewatch	·	2.0 km	MPC · JPL
304182	2006 QV_{37}	—	August 16, 2006	Siding Spring	SSS	·	2.1 km	MPC · JPL
304183	2006 QO_{41}	—	August 17, 2006	Palomar	NEAT	·	2.3 km	MPC · JPL
304184	2006 QH_{52}	—	August 23, 2006	Palomar	NEAT	·	2.4 km	MPC · JPL
304185	2006 QC_{53}	—	August 23, 2006	Palomar	NEAT	·	2.1 km	MPC · JPL
304186	2006 QN_{56}	—	August 20, 2006	Kitt Peak	Spacewatch	·	2.2 km	MPC · JPL
304187	2006 QF_{57}	—	August 23, 2006	Črni Vrh	Mikuž, H.	·	3.4 km	MPC · JPL
304188	2006 QZ_{59}	—	August 19, 2006	Palomar	NEAT	·	3.6 km	MPC · JPL
304189	2006 QU_{65}	—	August 27, 2006	Kitt Peak	Spacewatch	·	1.9 km	MPC · JPL
304190	2006 QY_{65}	—	August 25, 2006	Hibiscus	S. F. Hönig	·	2.1 km	MPC · JPL
304191	2006 QY_{70}	—	August 21, 2006	Kitt Peak	Spacewatch	·	1.9 km	MPC · JPL
304192	2006 QW_{78}	—	August 23, 2006	Socorro	LINEAR	(18466)	3.6 km	MPC · JPL
304193	2006 QM_{79}	—	August 24, 2006	Socorro	LINEAR	fast	2.6 km	MPC · JPL
304194	2006 QP_{80}	—	August 24, 2006	Palomar	NEAT	·	2.0 km	MPC · JPL
304195	2006 QG_{82}	—	August 25, 2006	Pises	Pises	·	1.9 km	MPC · JPL
304196	2006 QL_{92}	—	April 9, 2005	Kitt Peak	Spacewatch	(7744)	1.7 km	MPC · JPL
304197	2006 QL_{96}	—	August 16, 2006	Palomar	NEAT	·	3.2 km	MPC · JPL
304198	2006 QA_{98}	—	August 22, 2006	Palomar	NEAT	·	2.0 km	MPC · JPL
304199	2006 QF_{100}	—	August 24, 2006	Socorro	LINEAR	·	3.9 km	MPC · JPL
304200	2006 QJ_{102}	—	August 27, 2006	Kitt Peak	Spacewatch	·	2.2 km	MPC · JPL

== 304201–304300 ==
back to top

Designation			Discovery			Properties		Ref
Permanent	Provisional	Named after	Date	Site	Discoverer(s)	Category	Diam.	Ref
304201	2006 QN_{106}	—	August 28, 2006	Catalina	CSS	·	1.8 km	MPC · JPL
304202	2006 QQ_{106}	—	August 28, 2006	Catalina	CSS	PAD	2.0 km	MPC · JPL
304203	2006 QR_{110}	—	August 27, 2006	Vallemare Borbona	V. S. Casulli	·	2.0 km	MPC · JPL
304204	2006 QK_{112}	—	August 23, 2006	Palomar	NEAT	·	2.1 km	MPC · JPL
304205	2006 QB_{116}	—	August 27, 2006	Anderson Mesa	LONEOS	DOR	3.4 km	MPC · JPL
304206	2006 QJ_{116}	—	August 27, 2006	Anderson Mesa	LONEOS	(13314)	2.5 km	MPC · JPL
304207	2006 QB_{117}	—	August 27, 2006	Anderson Mesa	LONEOS	·	2.2 km	MPC · JPL
304208	2006 QY_{117}	—	August 27, 2006	Anderson Mesa	LONEOS	·	2.1 km	MPC · JPL
304209	2006 QD_{120}	—	August 29, 2006	Catalina	CSS	·	2.4 km	MPC · JPL
304210	2006 QY_{120}	—	August 29, 2006	Catalina	CSS	DOR	2.3 km	MPC · JPL
304211	2006 QT_{123}	—	August 29, 2006	Anderson Mesa	LONEOS	·	2.8 km	MPC · JPL
304212	2006 QN_{127}	—	August 17, 2006	Palomar	NEAT	·	2.2 km	MPC · JPL
304213	2006 QF_{130}	—	August 19, 2006	Palomar	NEAT	·	2.3 km	MPC · JPL
304214	2006 QU_{133}	—	August 24, 2006	Socorro	LINEAR	DOR	3.3 km	MPC · JPL
304215	2006 QS_{136}	—	August 30, 2006	Anderson Mesa	LONEOS	·	3.2 km	MPC · JPL
304216	2006 QU_{138}	—	August 16, 2006	Lulin	Lin, C.-S., Q. Ye	MRX	1.1 km	MPC · JPL
304217	2006 QH_{142}	—	August 18, 2006	Palomar	NEAT	·	2.1 km	MPC · JPL
304218	2006 QM_{146}	—	August 18, 2006	Kitt Peak	Spacewatch	MRX	1.2 km	MPC · JPL
304219	2006 QT_{147}	—	August 18, 2006	Kitt Peak	Spacewatch	·	2.3 km	MPC · JPL
304220	2006 QE_{158}	—	August 19, 2006	Kitt Peak	Spacewatch	·	2.0 km	MPC · JPL
304221	2006 QJ_{158}	—	August 19, 2006	Kitt Peak	Spacewatch	·	1.8 km	MPC · JPL
304222	2006 QA_{160}	—	August 19, 2006	Kitt Peak	Spacewatch	·	2.0 km	MPC · JPL
304223	2006 QN_{161}	—	August 19, 2006	Kitt Peak	Spacewatch	·	2.3 km	MPC · JPL
304224	2006 QP_{162}	—	August 21, 2006	Kitt Peak	Spacewatch	DOR	2.4 km	MPC · JPL
304225	2006 QX_{163}	—	August 29, 2006	Catalina	CSS	DOR	2.8 km	MPC · JPL
304226	2006 QG_{164}	—	August 29, 2006	Anderson Mesa	LONEOS	JUN	1.7 km	MPC · JPL
304227	2006 QD_{168}	—	August 30, 2006	Anderson Mesa	LONEOS	·	2.3 km	MPC · JPL
304228	2006 QD_{183}	—	August 21, 2006	Kitt Peak	Spacewatch	·	2.3 km	MPC · JPL
304229	2006 QE_{183}	—	August 21, 2006	Kitt Peak	Spacewatch	·	2.2 km	MPC · JPL
304230	2006 QG_{184}	—	August 18, 2006	Kitt Peak	Spacewatch	AST	1.8 km	MPC · JPL
304231	2006 QH_{184}	—	August 18, 2006	Kitt Peak	Spacewatch	KOR	1.5 km	MPC · JPL
304232	2006 QB_{185}	—	August 24, 2006	Palomar	NEAT	·	2.4 km	MPC · JPL
304233 Majaess	2006 RE_{3}	Majaess	September 14, 2006	Mauna Kea	D. D. Balam	·	2.5 km	MPC · JPL
304234	2006 RY_{4}	—	September 14, 2006	Catalina	CSS	·	3.2 km	MPC · JPL
304235	2006 RS_{9}	—	September 13, 2006	Palomar	NEAT	·	3.7 km	MPC · JPL
304236	2006 RH_{11}	—	September 12, 2006	Catalina	CSS	·	2.7 km	MPC · JPL
304237	2006 RL_{11}	—	September 12, 2006	Catalina	CSS	·	2.3 km	MPC · JPL
304238	2006 RN_{13}	—	March 17, 2005	Kitt Peak	Spacewatch	BRA	1.4 km	MPC · JPL
304239	2006 RS_{15}	—	September 14, 2006	Catalina	CSS	·	3.0 km	MPC · JPL
304240	2006 RK_{20}	—	September 15, 2006	Socorro	LINEAR	GEF	1.7 km	MPC · JPL
304241	2006 RS_{26}	—	September 14, 2006	Kitt Peak	Spacewatch	·	1.7 km	MPC · JPL
304242	2006 RE_{28}	—	September 14, 2006	Kitt Peak	Spacewatch	·	2.1 km	MPC · JPL
304243	2006 RJ_{29}	—	September 15, 2006	Kitt Peak	Spacewatch	ADE	2.2 km	MPC · JPL
304244	2006 RZ_{29}	—	September 15, 2006	Kitt Peak	Spacewatch	·	2.1 km	MPC · JPL
304245	2006 RD_{40}	—	September 12, 2006	Catalina	CSS	·	2.4 km	MPC · JPL
304246	2006 RB_{43}	—	September 14, 2006	Kitt Peak	Spacewatch	·	2.1 km	MPC · JPL
304247	2006 RR_{44}	—	September 14, 2006	Kitt Peak	Spacewatch	·	2.1 km	MPC · JPL
304248	2006 RR_{47}	—	September 14, 2006	Kitt Peak	Spacewatch	AGN	1.7 km	MPC · JPL
304249	2006 RS_{47}	—	September 14, 2006	Kitt Peak	Spacewatch	·	2.3 km	MPC · JPL
304250	2006 RP_{49}	—	September 14, 2006	Kitt Peak	Spacewatch	·	2.2 km	MPC · JPL
304251	2006 RN_{50}	—	September 14, 2006	Kitt Peak	Spacewatch	·	2.9 km	MPC · JPL
304252	2006 RP_{50}	—	September 14, 2006	Kitt Peak	Spacewatch	HOF	2.9 km	MPC · JPL
304253	2006 RA_{51}	—	September 14, 2006	Kitt Peak	Spacewatch	·	3.3 km	MPC · JPL
304254	2006 RR_{56}	—	September 14, 2006	Kitt Peak	Spacewatch	KOR	1.7 km	MPC · JPL
304255	2006 RX_{60}	—	September 14, 2006	Palomar	NEAT	·	2.6 km	MPC · JPL
304256	2006 RH_{65}	—	September 14, 2006	Palomar	NEAT	(18466)	2.6 km	MPC · JPL
304257	2006 RP_{66}	—	September 14, 2006	Kitt Peak	Spacewatch	·	2.4 km	MPC · JPL
304258	2006 RD_{69}	—	September 15, 2006	Kitt Peak	Spacewatch	WIT	1.2 km	MPC · JPL
304259	2006 RJ_{69}	—	September 15, 2006	Kitt Peak	Spacewatch	·	1.6 km	MPC · JPL
304260	2006 RX_{79}	—	September 15, 2006	Kitt Peak	Spacewatch	·	2.3 km	MPC · JPL
304261	2006 RT_{80}	—	September 15, 2006	Kitt Peak	Spacewatch	KOR	1.8 km	MPC · JPL
304262	2006 RZ_{81}	—	September 15, 2006	Kitt Peak	Spacewatch	·	2.3 km	MPC · JPL
304263	2006 RP_{83}	—	September 15, 2006	Kitt Peak	Spacewatch	·	2.0 km	MPC · JPL
304264	2006 RU_{85}	—	September 15, 2006	Kitt Peak	Spacewatch	KOR	1.4 km	MPC · JPL
304265	2006 RN_{89}	—	September 15, 2006	Kitt Peak	Spacewatch	·	2.2 km	MPC · JPL
304266	2006 RB_{92}	—	September 15, 2006	Kitt Peak	Spacewatch	·	2.5 km	MPC · JPL
304267	2006 RQ_{93}	—	September 15, 2006	Kitt Peak	Spacewatch	HOF	3.1 km	MPC · JPL
304268	2006 RK_{95}	—	September 15, 2006	Kitt Peak	Spacewatch	·	2.5 km	MPC · JPL
304269	2006 RL_{96}	—	September 15, 2006	Kitt Peak	Spacewatch	KOR	1.5 km	MPC · JPL
304270	2006 RF_{98}	—	September 14, 2006	Palomar	NEAT	·	2.6 km	MPC · JPL
304271	2006 RK_{102}	—	September 6, 2006	Palomar	NEAT	·	2.2 km	MPC · JPL
304272	2006 RG_{104}	—	September 11, 2006	Apache Point	A. C. Becker	MRX	1.0 km	MPC · JPL
304273 Seancarey	2006 RT_{117}	Seancarey	September 14, 2006	Mauna Kea	Masiero, J.	·	2.0 km	MPC · JPL
304274	2006 RF_{122}	—	September 15, 2006	Kitt Peak	Spacewatch	·	1.8 km	MPC · JPL
304275	2006 SJ_{10}	—	September 16, 2006	Kitt Peak	Spacewatch	·	1.6 km	MPC · JPL
304276	2006 SP_{15}	—	September 17, 2006	Catalina	CSS	HOF	3.2 km	MPC · JPL
304277	2006 SL_{20}	—	September 19, 2006	Vallemare Borbona	V. S. Casulli	KOR	1.5 km	MPC · JPL
304278	2006 SM_{24}	—	September 16, 2006	Catalina	CSS	DOR	2.8 km	MPC · JPL
304279	2006 SG_{29}	—	September 17, 2006	Kitt Peak	Spacewatch	·	1.8 km	MPC · JPL
304280	2006 SU_{29}	—	September 17, 2006	Kitt Peak	Spacewatch	WIT	1.2 km	MPC · JPL
304281	2006 SG_{38}	—	September 18, 2006	Kitt Peak	Spacewatch	GEF	1.5 km	MPC · JPL
304282	2006 SL_{47}	—	September 19, 2006	Catalina	CSS	·	2.2 km	MPC · JPL
304283	2006 SD_{52}	—	September 18, 2006	Anderson Mesa	LONEOS	·	2.4 km	MPC · JPL
304284	2006 SB_{53}	—	September 20, 2006	La Sagra	OAM	·	2.3 km	MPC · JPL
304285	2006 SO_{58}	—	September 20, 2006	Kitt Peak	Spacewatch	·	2.2 km	MPC · JPL
304286	2006 SJ_{60}	—	September 18, 2006	Catalina	CSS	GEF	1.7 km	MPC · JPL
304287	2006 SL_{61}	—	September 18, 2006	Catalina	CSS	·	3.2 km	MPC · JPL
304288	2006 SJ_{64}	—	September 19, 2006	Goodricke-Pigott	R. A. Tucker	EUP	5.9 km	MPC · JPL
304289	2006 SO_{68}	—	September 19, 2006	Kitt Peak	Spacewatch	·	2.6 km	MPC · JPL
304290	2006 SM_{70}	—	September 19, 2006	Kitt Peak	Spacewatch	·	2.3 km	MPC · JPL
304291	2006 SW_{73}	—	September 19, 2006	Kitt Peak	Spacewatch	·	2.0 km	MPC · JPL
304292	2006 SK_{77}	—	September 18, 2006	Catalina	CSS	·	1.8 km	MPC · JPL
304293	2006 SQ_{78}	—	September 25, 2006	Catalina	CSS	APO	600 m	MPC · JPL
304294	2006 SG_{82}	—	September 18, 2006	Kitt Peak	Spacewatch	·	1.8 km	MPC · JPL
304295	2006 SM_{85}	—	September 18, 2006	Kitt Peak	Spacewatch	·	2.3 km	MPC · JPL
304296	2006 SY_{87}	—	September 18, 2006	Kitt Peak	Spacewatch	·	2.1 km	MPC · JPL
304297	2006 SZ_{87}	—	September 18, 2006	Kitt Peak	Spacewatch	·	1.7 km	MPC · JPL
304298	2006 SF_{100}	—	September 19, 2006	Anderson Mesa	LONEOS	AGN	1.3 km	MPC · JPL
304299	2006 SL_{101}	—	September 19, 2006	Catalina	CSS	PAD	2.1 km	MPC · JPL
304300	2006 SS_{102}	—	September 19, 2006	Kitt Peak	Spacewatch	·	1.7 km	MPC · JPL

== 304301–304400 ==
back to top

Designation			Discovery			Properties		Ref
Permanent	Provisional	Named after	Date	Site	Discoverer(s)	Category	Diam.	Ref
304301	2006 SO_{106}	—	September 19, 2006	Kitt Peak	Spacewatch	·	1.7 km	MPC · JPL
304302	2006 ST_{117}	—	September 24, 2006	Kitt Peak	Spacewatch	·	4.2 km	MPC · JPL
304303	2006 SN_{121}	—	September 18, 2006	Anderson Mesa	LONEOS	MRX	1.1 km	MPC · JPL
304304	2006 SZ_{129}	—	September 19, 2006	Anderson Mesa	LONEOS	AGN	1.5 km	MPC · JPL
304305	2006 SW_{138}	—	September 21, 2006	Anderson Mesa	LONEOS	·	2.6 km	MPC · JPL
304306	2006 SF_{141}	—	September 25, 2006	Anderson Mesa	LONEOS	NAE	2.6 km	MPC · JPL
304307	2006 SN_{142}	—	September 19, 2006	Catalina	CSS	·	2.1 km	MPC · JPL
304308	2006 SG_{144}	—	September 19, 2006	Kitt Peak	Spacewatch	KOR	1.3 km	MPC · JPL
304309	2006 SA_{146}	—	September 19, 2006	Kitt Peak	Spacewatch	AGN	1.2 km	MPC · JPL
304310	2006 SG_{157}	—	September 23, 2006	Kitt Peak	Spacewatch	·	1.6 km	MPC · JPL
304311	2006 SL_{159}	—	September 23, 2006	Kitt Peak	Spacewatch	·	2.4 km	MPC · JPL
304312	2006 SC_{161}	—	September 23, 2006	Kitt Peak	Spacewatch	·	2.2 km	MPC · JPL
304313	2006 SD_{162}	—	September 24, 2006	Kitt Peak	Spacewatch	HOF	2.5 km	MPC · JPL
304314	2006 ST_{164}	—	September 25, 2006	Kitt Peak	Spacewatch	·	2.3 km	MPC · JPL
304315	2006 SU_{164}	—	September 25, 2006	Kitt Peak	Spacewatch	·	2.5 km	MPC · JPL
304316	2006 SB_{167}	—	September 25, 2006	Kitt Peak	Spacewatch	EOS	2.0 km	MPC · JPL
304317	2006 SF_{168}	—	September 25, 2006	Kitt Peak	Spacewatch	·	1.6 km	MPC · JPL
304318	2006 SU_{169}	—	September 25, 2006	Kitt Peak	Spacewatch	AGN	1.6 km	MPC · JPL
304319	2006 SE_{171}	—	September 25, 2006	Kitt Peak	Spacewatch	AGN	1.3 km	MPC · JPL
304320	2006 SF_{171}	—	September 22, 2001	Kitt Peak	Spacewatch	·	2.3 km	MPC · JPL
304321	2006 SS_{174}	—	September 25, 2006	Mount Lemmon	Mount Lemmon Survey	·	2.0 km	MPC · JPL
304322	2006 SO_{178}	—	September 25, 2006	Mount Lemmon	Mount Lemmon Survey	KOR	1.3 km	MPC · JPL
304323	2006 SH_{183}	—	September 25, 2006	Mount Lemmon	Mount Lemmon Survey	·	1.9 km	MPC · JPL
304324	2006 SV_{184}	—	September 25, 2006	Mount Lemmon	Mount Lemmon Survey	·	2.1 km	MPC · JPL
304325	2006 SM_{186}	—	September 25, 2006	Kitt Peak	Spacewatch	·	3.3 km	MPC · JPL
304326	2006 SX_{187}	—	September 26, 2006	Kitt Peak	Spacewatch	·	2.2 km	MPC · JPL
304327	2006 SC_{202}	—	September 24, 2006	Kitt Peak	Spacewatch	·	3.2 km	MPC · JPL
304328	2006 SK_{206}	—	September 25, 2006	Kitt Peak	Spacewatch	·	2.6 km	MPC · JPL
304329	2006 SD_{211}	—	September 26, 2006	Catalina	CSS	·	2.9 km	MPC · JPL
304330	2006 SX_{217}	—	September 30, 2006	Mount Lemmon	Mount Lemmon Survey	APO · PHA	780 m	MPC · JPL
304331	2006 ST_{222}	—	September 25, 2006	Mount Lemmon	Mount Lemmon Survey	NEM	2.4 km	MPC · JPL
304332	2006 SX_{223}	—	September 25, 2006	Mount Lemmon	Mount Lemmon Survey	KOR	1.5 km	MPC · JPL
304333	2006 SX_{224}	—	June 13, 2005	Mount Lemmon	Mount Lemmon Survey	·	2.4 km	MPC · JPL
304334	2006 ST_{231}	—	September 26, 2006	Kitt Peak	Spacewatch	·	2.0 km	MPC · JPL
304335	2006 SD_{234}	—	September 26, 2006	Kitt Peak	Spacewatch	·	2.5 km	MPC · JPL
304336	2006 SM_{249}	—	September 26, 2006	Kitt Peak	Spacewatch	·	2.6 km	MPC · JPL
304337	2006 SM_{250}	—	September 26, 2006	Kitt Peak	Spacewatch	·	2.8 km	MPC · JPL
304338	2006 SK_{251}	—	September 26, 2006	Kitt Peak	Spacewatch	KOR	1.3 km	MPC · JPL
304339	2006 SO_{253}	—	September 26, 2006	Mount Lemmon	Mount Lemmon Survey	·	2.3 km	MPC · JPL
304340	2006 SR_{256}	—	September 26, 2006	Kitt Peak	Spacewatch	·	2.0 km	MPC · JPL
304341	2006 SN_{258}	—	September 26, 2006	Kitt Peak	Spacewatch	KOR	1.4 km	MPC · JPL
304342	2006 SX_{258}	—	September 26, 2006	Kitt Peak	Spacewatch	KOR	1.3 km	MPC · JPL
304343	2006 SF_{262}	—	September 26, 2006	Mount Lemmon	Mount Lemmon Survey	EOS	2.6 km	MPC · JPL
304344	2006 SK_{263}	—	September 26, 2006	Kitt Peak	Spacewatch	·	3.4 km	MPC · JPL
304345	2006 SD_{264}	—	September 26, 2006	Kitt Peak	Spacewatch	·	2.9 km	MPC · JPL
304346	2006 SZ_{266}	—	September 26, 2006	Kitt Peak	Spacewatch	AGN	1.5 km	MPC · JPL
304347	2006 SV_{274}	—	September 27, 2006	Mount Lemmon	Mount Lemmon Survey	EOS	2.3 km	MPC · JPL
304348	2006 SL_{282}	—	September 25, 2006	Anderson Mesa	LONEOS	·	2.7 km	MPC · JPL
304349	2006 SO_{285}	—	September 25, 2006	Kitt Peak	Spacewatch	·	2.1 km	MPC · JPL
304350	2006 SX_{290}	—	September 18, 2006	Calvin-Rehoboth	Calvin College	·	2.2 km	MPC · JPL
304351	2006 SK_{295}	—	September 25, 2006	Kitt Peak	Spacewatch	KOR	1.4 km	MPC · JPL
304352	2006 SD_{296}	—	September 25, 2006	Kitt Peak	Spacewatch	·	2.2 km	MPC · JPL
304353	2006 SW_{310}	—	September 27, 2006	Kitt Peak	Spacewatch	·	2.9 km	MPC · JPL
304354	2006 SB_{313}	—	September 27, 2006	Kitt Peak	Spacewatch	AGN	1.3 km	MPC · JPL
304355	2006 SB_{315}	—	September 27, 2006	Kitt Peak	Spacewatch	AGN	1.2 km	MPC · JPL
304356	2006 SW_{321}	—	September 27, 2006	Kitt Peak	Spacewatch	·	2.0 km	MPC · JPL
304357	2006 SY_{322}	—	September 27, 2006	Kitt Peak	Spacewatch	·	2.3 km	MPC · JPL
304358	2006 SJ_{329}	—	September 27, 2006	Kitt Peak	Spacewatch	·	1.8 km	MPC · JPL
304359	2006 SF_{330}	—	September 27, 2006	Kitt Peak	Spacewatch	·	2.0 km	MPC · JPL
304360	2006 SM_{333}	—	September 28, 2006	Kitt Peak	Spacewatch	·	3.1 km	MPC · JPL
304361	2006 SA_{335}	—	September 28, 2006	Kitt Peak	Spacewatch	·	2.6 km	MPC · JPL
304362	2006 SA_{336}	—	September 28, 2006	Kitt Peak	Spacewatch	AGN	1.3 km	MPC · JPL
304363	2006 SW_{336}	—	September 28, 2006	Kitt Peak	Spacewatch	·	3.1 km	MPC · JPL
304364	2006 SK_{340}	—	September 28, 2006	Kitt Peak	Spacewatch	·	2.4 km	MPC · JPL
304365	2006 SJ_{341}	—	September 28, 2006	Kitt Peak	Spacewatch	HOF	3.5 km	MPC · JPL
304366	2006 SP_{346}	—	September 28, 2006	Kitt Peak	Spacewatch	·	2.3 km	MPC · JPL
304367	2006 SR_{361}	—	September 30, 2006	Mount Lemmon	Mount Lemmon Survey	·	2.4 km	MPC · JPL
304368 Móricz	2006 SX_{363}	Móricz	September 26, 2006	Piszkés-tető	K. Sárneczky, B. Csák	·	2.4 km	MPC · JPL
304369	2006 SZ_{363}	—	September 27, 2006	Kitt Peak	Spacewatch	·	3.0 km	MPC · JPL
304370	2006 SC_{369}	—	September 27, 2006	Mount Lemmon	Mount Lemmon Survey	H	590 m	MPC · JPL
304371	2006 SO_{373}	—	September 16, 2006	Apache Point	A. C. Becker	·	4.0 km	MPC · JPL
304372	2006 SD_{376}	—	September 17, 2006	Apache Point	A. C. Becker	EUN	1.3 km	MPC · JPL
304373	2006 SZ_{376}	—	September 17, 2006	Apache Point	A. C. Becker	·	3.2 km	MPC · JPL
304374	2006 SB_{378}	—	September 18, 2006	Apache Point	A. C. Becker	·	2.0 km	MPC · JPL
304375	2006 SD_{378}	—	September 18, 2006	Apache Point	A. C. Becker	·	2.3 km	MPC · JPL
304376	2006 SF_{381}	—	September 28, 2006	Apache Point	A. C. Becker	·	1.7 km	MPC · JPL
304377	2006 SN_{381}	—	September 28, 2006	Apache Point	A. C. Becker	·	1.9 km	MPC · JPL
304378	2006 SJ_{382}	—	September 28, 2006	Apache Point	A. C. Becker	·	3.0 km	MPC · JPL
304379	2006 SU_{383}	—	September 29, 2006	Apache Point	A. C. Becker	·	1.7 km	MPC · JPL
304380	2006 SZ_{384}	—	October 11, 2006	Palomar	NEAT	·	3.8 km	MPC · JPL
304381	2006 SA_{388}	—	September 30, 2006	Apache Point	A. C. Becker	·	2.8 km	MPC · JPL
304382	2006 SR_{392}	—	September 26, 2006	Kitt Peak	Spacewatch	TEL	1.8 km	MPC · JPL
304383	2006 SZ_{392}	—	September 27, 2006	Mount Lemmon	Mount Lemmon Survey	·	3.1 km	MPC · JPL
304384	2006 SD_{393}	—	September 28, 2006	Catalina	CSS	·	2.5 km	MPC · JPL
304385	2006 SE_{393}	—	September 28, 2006	Mount Lemmon	Mount Lemmon Survey	KOR	1.4 km	MPC · JPL
304386	2006 SS_{394}	—	September 17, 2006	Kitt Peak	Spacewatch	·	1.8 km	MPC · JPL
304387	2006 SQ_{399}	—	September 18, 2006	Kitt Peak	Spacewatch	AGN	1.4 km	MPC · JPL
304388	2006 SQ_{401}	—	September 30, 2006	Mount Lemmon	Mount Lemmon Survey	EOS	2.0 km	MPC · JPL
304389	2006 SF_{402}	—	September 18, 2006	Kitt Peak	Spacewatch	EOS	1.8 km	MPC · JPL
304390	2006 SH_{403}	—	September 27, 2006	Mount Lemmon	Mount Lemmon Survey	·	2.2 km	MPC · JPL
304391	2006 SK_{403}	—	September 27, 2006	Mount Lemmon	Mount Lemmon Survey	·	3.6 km	MPC · JPL
304392	2006 SM_{407}	—	September 24, 2006	Kitt Peak	Spacewatch	AGN	1.0 km	MPC · JPL
304393	2006 SL_{413}	—	September 26, 2006	Mount Lemmon	Mount Lemmon Survey	H	550 m	MPC · JPL
304394	2006 TA_{1}	—	October 3, 2006	Mount Lemmon	Mount Lemmon Survey	·	2.4 km	MPC · JPL
304395	2006 TJ_{1}	—	October 1, 2006	Socorro	LINEAR	·	2.3 km	MPC · JPL
304396	2006 TU_{2}	—	October 2, 2006	Mount Lemmon	Mount Lemmon Survey	(16286)	2.2 km	MPC · JPL
304397	2006 TD_{3}	—	October 2, 2006	Catalina	CSS	AGN	1.6 km	MPC · JPL
304398	2006 TH_{8}	—	October 4, 2006	Mount Lemmon	Mount Lemmon Survey	KOR	1.3 km	MPC · JPL
304399	2006 TP_{14}	—	October 11, 2006	Kitt Peak	Spacewatch	WIT	1.3 km	MPC · JPL
304400	2006 TS_{22}	—	October 11, 2006	Kitt Peak	Spacewatch	·	2.6 km	MPC · JPL

== 304401–304500 ==
back to top

Designation			Discovery			Properties		Ref
Permanent	Provisional	Named after	Date	Site	Discoverer(s)	Category	Diam.	Ref
304401	2006 TW_{23}	—	October 11, 2006	Kitt Peak	Spacewatch	TEL	1.5 km	MPC · JPL
304402	2006 TL_{27}	—	October 12, 2006	Kitt Peak	Spacewatch	·	1.8 km	MPC · JPL
304403	2006 TA_{28}	—	October 12, 2006	Kitt Peak	Spacewatch	·	1.8 km	MPC · JPL
304404	2006 TM_{28}	—	October 12, 2006	Kitt Peak	Spacewatch	·	4.2 km	MPC · JPL
304405	2006 TE_{33}	—	October 12, 2006	Kitt Peak	Spacewatch	·	2.2 km	MPC · JPL
304406	2006 TH_{40}	—	October 12, 2006	Kitt Peak	Spacewatch	·	2.7 km	MPC · JPL
304407	2006 TU_{40}	—	October 12, 2006	Kitt Peak	Spacewatch	KOR	1.7 km	MPC · JPL
304408	2006 TY_{40}	—	October 12, 2006	Kitt Peak	Spacewatch	EOS	3.8 km	MPC · JPL
304409	2006 TT_{41}	—	October 12, 2006	Kitt Peak	Spacewatch	KOR	1.8 km	MPC · JPL
304410	2006 TA_{47}	—	October 12, 2006	Kitt Peak	Spacewatch	KOR	1.5 km	MPC · JPL
304411	2006 TK_{47}	—	October 12, 2006	Kitt Peak	Spacewatch	·	3.8 km	MPC · JPL
304412	2006 TM_{48}	—	October 12, 2006	Kitt Peak	Spacewatch	·	2.2 km	MPC · JPL
304413	2006 TW_{51}	—	October 12, 2006	Kitt Peak	Spacewatch	·	2.4 km	MPC · JPL
304414	2006 TR_{52}	—	October 12, 2006	Kitt Peak	Spacewatch	·	3.8 km	MPC · JPL
304415	2006 TV_{53}	—	October 12, 2006	Kitt Peak	Spacewatch	·	3.2 km	MPC · JPL
304416	2006 TU_{56}	—	October 14, 2006	Sandlot	Sandlot	·	2.4 km	MPC · JPL
304417	2006 TP_{57}	—	October 15, 2006	Kitt Peak	Spacewatch	H	560 m	MPC · JPL
304418	2006 TD_{58}	—	October 15, 2006	Catalina	CSS	·	3.4 km	MPC · JPL
304419	2006 TT_{63}	—	October 10, 2006	Palomar	NEAT	·	2.6 km	MPC · JPL
304420	2006 TK_{64}	—	October 11, 2006	Palomar	NEAT	GEF	1.6 km	MPC · JPL
304421	2006 TY_{64}	—	October 11, 2006	Kitt Peak	Spacewatch	·	2.6 km	MPC · JPL
304422	2006 TQ_{67}	—	October 11, 2006	Kitt Peak	Spacewatch	EOS	1.8 km	MPC · JPL
304423	2006 TM_{68}	—	October 11, 2006	Palomar	NEAT	·	5.4 km	MPC · JPL
304424	2006 TJ_{74}	—	October 11, 2006	Palomar	NEAT	·	4.4 km	MPC · JPL
304425	2006 TG_{77}	—	October 11, 2006	Palomar	NEAT	·	4.4 km	MPC · JPL
304426	2006 TS_{77}	—	October 12, 2006	Kitt Peak	Spacewatch	KOR	1.3 km	MPC · JPL
304427	2006 TX_{80}	—	October 13, 2006	Kitt Peak	Spacewatch	·	3.7 km	MPC · JPL
304428	2006 TO_{81}	—	October 13, 2006	Kitt Peak	Spacewatch	EOS	1.9 km	MPC · JPL
304429	2006 TT_{86}	—	October 13, 2006	Kitt Peak	Spacewatch	·	2.9 km	MPC · JPL
304430	2006 TW_{87}	—	October 13, 2006	Kitt Peak	Spacewatch	·	6.4 km	MPC · JPL
304431	2006 TY_{88}	—	October 13, 2006	Kitt Peak	Spacewatch	·	2.8 km	MPC · JPL
304432	2006 TC_{90}	—	October 13, 2006	Kitt Peak	Spacewatch	·	3.3 km	MPC · JPL
304433	2006 TH_{91}	—	October 13, 2006	Kitt Peak	Spacewatch	·	2.9 km	MPC · JPL
304434	2006 TE_{94}	—	October 15, 2006	Catalina	CSS	·	2.4 km	MPC · JPL
304435	2006 TQ_{97}	—	October 13, 2006	Kitt Peak	Spacewatch	·	4.5 km	MPC · JPL
304436	2006 TK_{98}	—	October 15, 2006	Kitt Peak	Spacewatch	T_{j} (2.99)	3.5 km	MPC · JPL
304437	2006 TK_{99}	—	October 15, 2006	Kitt Peak	Spacewatch	·	3.6 km	MPC · JPL
304438	2006 TM_{99}	—	October 15, 2006	Kitt Peak	Spacewatch	·	2.9 km	MPC · JPL
304439	2006 TZ_{106}	—	October 4, 2006	Mount Lemmon	Mount Lemmon Survey	·	1.9 km	MPC · JPL
304440	2006 TB_{110}	—	October 12, 2006	Kitt Peak	Spacewatch	·	2.9 km	MPC · JPL
304441	2006 TV_{120}	—	October 12, 2006	Apache Point	A. C. Becker	·	2.3 km	MPC · JPL
304442	2006 TN_{121}	—	October 4, 2006	Mount Lemmon	Mount Lemmon Survey	·	1.8 km	MPC · JPL
304443	2006 TN_{126}	—	October 1, 2006	Kitt Peak	Spacewatch	·	2.0 km	MPC · JPL
304444	2006 TH_{128}	—	October 2, 2006	Kitt Peak	Spacewatch	·	2.0 km	MPC · JPL
304445	2006 TD_{130}	—	October 11, 2006	Palomar	NEAT	·	3.6 km	MPC · JPL
304446	2006 UP_{3}	—	October 16, 2006	Piszkéstető	K. Sárneczky, Kuli, Z.	·	2.6 km	MPC · JPL
304447	2006 UR_{6}	—	October 16, 2006	Catalina	CSS	(18466)	3.5 km	MPC · JPL
304448	2006 UL_{9}	—	October 16, 2006	Kitt Peak	Spacewatch	·	3.4 km	MPC · JPL
304449	2006 UX_{9}	—	October 16, 2006	Kitt Peak	Spacewatch	KOR	1.5 km	MPC · JPL
304450	2006 UU_{11}	—	October 17, 2006	Mount Lemmon	Mount Lemmon Survey	·	2.7 km	MPC · JPL
304451	2006 UO_{13}	—	October 17, 2006	Mount Lemmon	Mount Lemmon Survey	·	3.1 km	MPC · JPL
304452	2006 US_{14}	—	October 17, 2006	Mount Lemmon	Mount Lemmon Survey	KOR	1.4 km	MPC · JPL
304453	2006 UZ_{14}	—	October 17, 2006	Mount Lemmon	Mount Lemmon Survey	·	2.6 km	MPC · JPL
304454	2006 UW_{20}	—	October 16, 2006	Kitt Peak	Spacewatch	AGN	1.3 km	MPC · JPL
304455	2006 UF_{21}	—	October 16, 2006	Kitt Peak	Spacewatch	AGN	1.4 km	MPC · JPL
304456	2006 UR_{22}	—	October 16, 2006	Mount Lemmon	Mount Lemmon Survey	·	2.4 km	MPC · JPL
304457	2006 UB_{23}	—	October 16, 2006	Mount Lemmon	Mount Lemmon Survey	·	2.4 km	MPC · JPL
304458	2006 UK_{27}	—	October 16, 2006	Kitt Peak	Spacewatch	HOF	3.2 km	MPC · JPL
304459	2006 UV_{27}	—	October 16, 2006	Kitt Peak	Spacewatch	AGN	1.6 km	MPC · JPL
304460	2006 UX_{27}	—	October 16, 2006	Kitt Peak	Spacewatch	·	2.2 km	MPC · JPL
304461	2006 UZ_{30}	—	October 16, 2006	Kitt Peak	Spacewatch	KOR	1.2 km	MPC · JPL
304462	2006 UG_{32}	—	October 16, 2006	Kitt Peak	Spacewatch	TEL	1.6 km	MPC · JPL
304463	2006 UG_{41}	—	October 16, 2006	Kitt Peak	Spacewatch	·	2.3 km	MPC · JPL
304464	2006 UP_{44}	—	October 16, 2006	Kitt Peak	Spacewatch	KOR	1.3 km	MPC · JPL
304465	2006 UY_{46}	—	October 16, 2006	Kitt Peak	Spacewatch	·	3.4 km	MPC · JPL
304466	2006 UC_{48}	—	October 17, 2006	Kitt Peak	Spacewatch	·	3.0 km	MPC · JPL
304467	2006 UT_{51}	—	October 17, 2006	Kitt Peak	Spacewatch	·	2.2 km	MPC · JPL
304468	2006 UV_{56}	—	October 18, 2006	Kitt Peak	Spacewatch	ADE	3.2 km	MPC · JPL
304469	2006 UU_{65}	—	October 16, 2006	Catalina	CSS	·	4.0 km	MPC · JPL
304470	2006 UU_{66}	—	October 16, 2006	Catalina	CSS	·	3.1 km	MPC · JPL
304471	2006 UD_{74}	—	October 17, 2006	Kitt Peak	Spacewatch	·	3.0 km	MPC · JPL
304472	2006 UC_{75}	—	October 17, 2006	Catalina	CSS	·	2.4 km	MPC · JPL
304473	2006 US_{79}	—	October 17, 2006	Kitt Peak	Spacewatch	·	2.5 km	MPC · JPL
304474	2006 UE_{84}	—	October 17, 2006	Mount Lemmon	Mount Lemmon Survey	·	3.6 km	MPC · JPL
304475	2006 UD_{85}	—	October 17, 2006	Mount Lemmon	Mount Lemmon Survey	EOS	2.3 km	MPC · JPL
304476	2006 UM_{86}	—	October 17, 2006	Mount Lemmon	Mount Lemmon Survey	KOR	1.4 km	MPC · JPL
304477	2006 UY_{87}	—	September 27, 2006	Mount Lemmon	Mount Lemmon Survey	·	3.8 km	MPC · JPL
304478	2006 UV_{88}	—	October 17, 2006	Kitt Peak	Spacewatch	·	5.6 km	MPC · JPL
304479	2006 UL_{89}	—	October 17, 2006	Kitt Peak	Spacewatch	·	1.9 km	MPC · JPL
304480	2006 UU_{89}	—	October 17, 2006	Kitt Peak	Spacewatch	·	2.0 km	MPC · JPL
304481	2006 UC_{95}	—	October 18, 2006	Kitt Peak	Spacewatch	·	2.7 km	MPC · JPL
304482	2006 UJ_{96}	—	October 18, 2006	Kitt Peak	Spacewatch	·	2.1 km	MPC · JPL
304483	2006 UV_{99}	—	October 18, 2006	Kitt Peak	Spacewatch	·	2.5 km	MPC · JPL
304484	2006 UP_{103}	—	October 18, 2006	Kitt Peak	Spacewatch	·	1.8 km	MPC · JPL
304485	2006 UV_{105}	—	October 18, 2006	Kitt Peak	Spacewatch	·	3.4 km	MPC · JPL
304486	2006 UF_{108}	—	October 18, 2006	Kitt Peak	Spacewatch	·	4.1 km	MPC · JPL
304487	2006 UJ_{113}	—	October 19, 2006	Kitt Peak	Spacewatch	·	2.7 km	MPC · JPL
304488	2006 UR_{113}	—	October 19, 2006	Kitt Peak	Spacewatch	·	2.1 km	MPC · JPL
304489	2006 UB_{117}	—	October 19, 2006	Kitt Peak	Spacewatch	KOR	1.4 km	MPC · JPL
304490	2006 UJ_{118}	—	October 19, 2006	Kitt Peak	Spacewatch	·	1.9 km	MPC · JPL
304491	2006 UB_{121}	—	October 19, 2006	Kitt Peak	Spacewatch	KOR	1.2 km	MPC · JPL
304492	2006 UU_{121}	—	October 19, 2006	Kitt Peak	Spacewatch	·	2.5 km	MPC · JPL
304493	2006 UO_{124}	—	October 19, 2006	Mount Lemmon	Mount Lemmon Survey	AGN	1.1 km	MPC · JPL
304494	2006 UF_{126}	—	October 19, 2006	Kitt Peak	Spacewatch	HYG	3.1 km	MPC · JPL
304495	2006 UM_{136}	—	October 19, 2006	Mount Lemmon	Mount Lemmon Survey	HYG	2.6 km	MPC · JPL
304496	2006 UG_{139}	—	October 19, 2006	Kitt Peak	Spacewatch	·	3.1 km	MPC · JPL
304497	2006 UE_{141}	—	October 19, 2006	Mount Lemmon	Mount Lemmon Survey	·	2.9 km	MPC · JPL
304498	2006 UW_{153}	—	October 21, 2006	Kitt Peak	Spacewatch	·	2.5 km	MPC · JPL
304499	2006 UL_{157}	—	October 21, 2006	Mount Lemmon	Mount Lemmon Survey	AGN	1.3 km	MPC · JPL
304500	2006 UK_{158}	—	October 21, 2006	Mount Lemmon	Mount Lemmon Survey	KOR	1.6 km	MPC · JPL

== 304501–304600 ==
back to top

Designation			Discovery			Properties		Ref
Permanent	Provisional	Named after	Date	Site	Discoverer(s)	Category	Diam.	Ref
304501	2006 UM_{162}	—	October 21, 2006	Mount Lemmon	Mount Lemmon Survey	·	2.5 km	MPC · JPL
304502	2006 UZ_{163}	—	October 21, 2006	Mount Lemmon	Mount Lemmon Survey	·	4.4 km	MPC · JPL
304503	2006 UY_{175}	—	October 16, 2006	Catalina	CSS	PAD	3.3 km	MPC · JPL
304504	2006 UZ_{176}	—	October 16, 2006	Catalina	CSS	·	2.2 km	MPC · JPL
304505	2006 UM_{179}	—	October 16, 2006	Catalina	CSS	·	2.5 km	MPC · JPL
304506	2006 UR_{190}	—	October 19, 2006	Catalina	CSS	·	3.2 km	MPC · JPL
304507	2006 UU_{190}	—	October 19, 2006	Kitt Peak	Spacewatch	·	4.8 km	MPC · JPL
304508	2006 UP_{195}	—	October 20, 2006	Kitt Peak	Spacewatch	KOR	1.5 km	MPC · JPL
304509	2006 UM_{197}	—	October 20, 2006	Kitt Peak	Spacewatch	·	2.3 km	MPC · JPL
304510	2006 UT_{199}	—	October 21, 2006	Kitt Peak	Spacewatch	·	2.5 km	MPC · JPL
304511	2006 UY_{201}	—	October 22, 2006	Palomar	NEAT	·	2.3 km	MPC · JPL
304512	2006 UY_{202}	—	October 22, 2006	Palomar	NEAT	·	2.6 km	MPC · JPL
304513	2006 UB_{208}	—	October 23, 2006	Kitt Peak	Spacewatch	KOR	1.2 km	MPC · JPL
304514	2006 US_{208}	—	October 23, 2006	Kitt Peak	Spacewatch	EOS	2.1 km	MPC · JPL
304515	2006 UO_{210}	—	October 23, 2006	Kitt Peak	Spacewatch	·	2.5 km	MPC · JPL
304516	2006 UU_{212}	—	October 23, 2006	Kitt Peak	Spacewatch	EOS	2.2 km	MPC · JPL
304517	2006 UH_{214}	—	October 23, 2006	Kitt Peak	Spacewatch	·	1.9 km	MPC · JPL
304518	2006 UJ_{215}	—	October 27, 2006	Calvin-Rehoboth	L. A. Molnar	·	2.6 km	MPC · JPL
304519	2006 UC_{218}	—	October 27, 2006	Mount Nyukasa	Japan Aerospace Exploration Agency	·	3.0 km	MPC · JPL
304520	2006 UJ_{219}	—	October 16, 2006	Catalina	CSS	615	1.7 km	MPC · JPL
304521	2006 UV_{225}	—	October 20, 2006	Palomar	NEAT	KOR	2.1 km	MPC · JPL
304522	2006 UX_{227}	—	October 20, 2006	Palomar	NEAT	·	3.5 km	MPC · JPL
304523	2006 UC_{235}	—	October 22, 2006	Mount Lemmon	Mount Lemmon Survey	·	4.3 km	MPC · JPL
304524	2006 UH_{235}	—	October 23, 2006	Kitt Peak	Spacewatch	·	2.4 km	MPC · JPL
304525	2006 UQ_{243}	—	October 27, 2006	Mount Lemmon	Mount Lemmon Survey	·	1.7 km	MPC · JPL
304526	2006 UD_{255}	—	October 27, 2006	Catalina	CSS	·	3.8 km	MPC · JPL
304527	2006 UU_{256}	—	October 28, 2006	Kitt Peak	Spacewatch	·	2.7 km	MPC · JPL
304528	2006 UH_{263}	—	October 31, 2006	Bergisch Gladbach	W. Bickel	EOS	1.7 km	MPC · JPL
304529	2006 UZ_{263}	—	October 27, 2006	Kitt Peak	Spacewatch	·	2.7 km	MPC · JPL
304530	2006 UG_{267}	—	October 27, 2006	Catalina	CSS	·	3.5 km	MPC · JPL
304531	2006 UL_{269}	—	October 27, 2006	Mount Lemmon	Mount Lemmon Survey	·	2.2 km	MPC · JPL
304532	2006 UV_{269}	—	October 27, 2006	Kitt Peak	Spacewatch	EOS	2.4 km	MPC · JPL
304533	2006 UJ_{270}	—	October 27, 2006	Kitt Peak	Spacewatch	·	2.3 km	MPC · JPL
304534	2006 UA_{271}	—	October 27, 2006	Mount Lemmon	Mount Lemmon Survey	EOS	2.2 km	MPC · JPL
304535	2006 UR_{271}	—	October 27, 2006	Mount Lemmon	Mount Lemmon Survey	·	3.2 km	MPC · JPL
304536	2006 UT_{271}	—	October 27, 2006	Mount Lemmon	Mount Lemmon Survey	·	3.6 km	MPC · JPL
304537	2006 US_{274}	—	October 28, 2006	Kitt Peak	Spacewatch	·	2.2 km	MPC · JPL
304538	2006 UK_{276}	—	October 28, 2006	Mount Lemmon	Mount Lemmon Survey	·	2.2 km	MPC · JPL
304539	2006 UX_{280}	—	October 28, 2006	Mount Lemmon	Mount Lemmon Survey	EOS	2.0 km	MPC · JPL
304540	2006 UF_{283}	—	October 28, 2006	Kitt Peak	Spacewatch	·	3.8 km	MPC · JPL
304541	2006 UJ_{283}	—	October 28, 2006	Kitt Peak	Spacewatch	·	1.9 km	MPC · JPL
304542	2006 UT_{284}	—	October 28, 2006	Kitt Peak	Spacewatch	EOS	1.9 km	MPC · JPL
304543	2006 UF_{285}	—	October 28, 2006	Mount Lemmon	Mount Lemmon Survey	·	4.7 km	MPC · JPL
304544	2006 UP_{285}	—	October 28, 2006	Kitt Peak	Spacewatch	·	2.2 km	MPC · JPL
304545	2006 UR_{287}	—	October 29, 2006	Kitt Peak	Spacewatch	·	1.9 km	MPC · JPL
304546	2006 UC_{289}	—	October 31, 2006	Kitt Peak	Spacewatch	EOS	1.8 km	MPC · JPL
304547	2006 UC_{314}	—	October 19, 2006	Kitt Peak	M. W. Buie	·	4.0 km	MPC · JPL
304548	2006 UO_{323}	—	October 21, 2006	Mount Lemmon	Mount Lemmon Survey	KOR	1.4 km	MPC · JPL
304549	2006 UM_{325}	—	October 20, 2006	Kitt Peak	M. W. Buie	·	2.0 km	MPC · JPL
304550	2006 UD_{328}	—	October 16, 2006	Kitt Peak	Spacewatch	·	1.9 km	MPC · JPL
304551	2006 UT_{328}	—	October 19, 2006	Mount Lemmon	Mount Lemmon Survey	·	2.8 km	MPC · JPL
304552	2006 UB_{329}	—	October 21, 2006	Kitt Peak	Spacewatch	·	2.7 km	MPC · JPL
304553	2006 UG_{332}	—	October 21, 2006	Apache Point	A. C. Becker	·	2.4 km	MPC · JPL
304554	2006 US_{332}	—	October 21, 2006	Apache Point	A. C. Becker	·	2.1 km	MPC · JPL
304555	2006 UC_{336}	—	October 20, 2006	Kitt Peak	Spacewatch	·	3.1 km	MPC · JPL
304556	2006 UE_{337}	—	October 22, 2006	Mount Lemmon	Mount Lemmon Survey	KOR	1.7 km	MPC · JPL
304557 Welling	2006 UL_{352}	Welling	October 26, 2006	Mauna Kea	P. A. Wiegert	KOR	1.5 km	MPC · JPL
304558	2006 UW_{359}	—	October 22, 2006	Kitt Peak	Spacewatch	·	1.9 km	MPC · JPL
304559	2006 UP_{360}	—	October 17, 2006	Mount Lemmon	Mount Lemmon Survey	KOR	1.5 km	MPC · JPL
304560	2006 VO_{3}	—	November 9, 2006	Kitt Peak	Spacewatch	·	1.8 km	MPC · JPL
304561	2006 VO_{5}	—	November 10, 2006	Kitt Peak	Spacewatch	·	1.9 km	MPC · JPL
304562	2006 VE_{6}	—	November 10, 2006	Kitt Peak	Spacewatch	·	2.9 km	MPC · JPL
304563	2006 VQ_{6}	—	November 10, 2006	Kitt Peak	Spacewatch	·	3.5 km	MPC · JPL
304564	2006 VG_{7}	—	November 10, 2006	Kitt Peak	Spacewatch	·	2.5 km	MPC · JPL
304565	2006 VN_{8}	—	November 11, 2006	Kitt Peak	Spacewatch	·	3.2 km	MPC · JPL
304566	2006 VF_{9}	—	November 11, 2006	Catalina	CSS	·	2.1 km	MPC · JPL
304567	2006 VP_{11}	—	November 11, 2006	Mount Lemmon	Mount Lemmon Survey	KOR	1.7 km	MPC · JPL
304568	2006 VE_{19}	—	November 9, 2006	Kitt Peak	Spacewatch	·	4.7 km	MPC · JPL
304569	2006 VH_{19}	—	November 9, 2006	Kitt Peak	Spacewatch	·	4.2 km	MPC · JPL
304570	2006 VF_{26}	—	November 10, 2006	Kitt Peak	Spacewatch	EOS	2.6 km	MPC · JPL
304571	2006 VJ_{28}	—	November 10, 2006	Kitt Peak	Spacewatch	(159)	2.5 km	MPC · JPL
304572	2006 VD_{29}	—	November 10, 2006	Kitt Peak	Spacewatch	·	3.6 km	MPC · JPL
304573	2006 VM_{31}	—	November 11, 2006	Kitt Peak	Spacewatch	AGN	1.2 km	MPC · JPL
304574	2006 VO_{34}	—	November 11, 2006	Catalina	CSS	·	2.6 km	MPC · JPL
304575	2006 VL_{36}	—	November 11, 2006	Mount Lemmon	Mount Lemmon Survey	·	3.1 km	MPC · JPL
304576	2006 VY_{36}	—	November 11, 2006	Catalina	CSS	·	4.6 km	MPC · JPL
304577	2006 VX_{38}	—	October 12, 2006	Kitt Peak	Spacewatch	(159)	2.9 km	MPC · JPL
304578	2006 VN_{42}	—	October 22, 2006	Kitt Peak	Spacewatch	·	2.3 km	MPC · JPL
304579	2006 VS_{42}	—	November 12, 2006	Mount Lemmon	Mount Lemmon Survey	·	3.6 km	MPC · JPL
304580	2006 VP_{44}	—	November 1, 2006	Kitt Peak	Spacewatch	KOR	1.3 km	MPC · JPL
304581	2006 VB_{46}	—	November 9, 2006	Kitt Peak	Spacewatch	·	2.1 km	MPC · JPL
304582	2006 VL_{46}	—	November 9, 2006	Kitt Peak	Spacewatch	EOS	2.0 km	MPC · JPL
304583	2006 VY_{47}	—	November 10, 2006	Kitt Peak	Spacewatch	·	2.2 km	MPC · JPL
304584	2006 VC_{49}	—	November 10, 2006	Kitt Peak	Spacewatch	·	3.3 km	MPC · JPL
304585	2006 VV_{49}	—	November 10, 2006	Kitt Peak	Spacewatch	·	2.5 km	MPC · JPL
304586	2006 VY_{49}	—	November 10, 2006	Kitt Peak	Spacewatch	·	2.9 km	MPC · JPL
304587	2006 VV_{52}	—	November 11, 2006	Kitt Peak	Spacewatch	·	4.4 km	MPC · JPL
304588	2006 VS_{53}	—	November 11, 2006	Kitt Peak	Spacewatch	·	2.9 km	MPC · JPL
304589	2006 VE_{54}	—	November 11, 2006	Kitt Peak	Spacewatch	·	2.7 km	MPC · JPL
304590	2006 VO_{57}	—	November 11, 2006	Kitt Peak	Spacewatch	·	2.5 km	MPC · JPL
304591	2006 VU_{57}	—	November 11, 2006	Kitt Peak	Spacewatch	·	2.1 km	MPC · JPL
304592	2006 VC_{60}	—	November 11, 2006	Kitt Peak	Spacewatch	·	2.8 km	MPC · JPL
304593	2006 VC_{61}	—	November 11, 2006	Kitt Peak	Spacewatch	·	2.4 km	MPC · JPL
304594	2006 VE_{63}	—	November 11, 2006	Kitt Peak	Spacewatch	THM	2.3 km	MPC · JPL
304595	2006 VW_{63}	—	November 11, 2006	Kitt Peak	Spacewatch	EOS	2.6 km	MPC · JPL
304596	2006 VJ_{65}	—	November 11, 2006	Kitt Peak	Spacewatch	·	3.0 km	MPC · JPL
304597	2006 VJ_{66}	—	November 11, 2006	Kitt Peak	Spacewatch	·	2.3 km	MPC · JPL
304598	2006 VP_{69}	—	November 11, 2006	Kitt Peak	Spacewatch	·	1.8 km	MPC · JPL
304599	2006 VA_{70}	—	November 11, 2006	Kitt Peak	Spacewatch	·	2.2 km	MPC · JPL
304600	2006 VM_{70}	—	November 11, 2006	Kitt Peak	Spacewatch	·	1.7 km	MPC · JPL

== 304601–304700 ==
back to top

Designation			Discovery			Properties		Ref
Permanent	Provisional	Named after	Date	Site	Discoverer(s)	Category	Diam.	Ref
304601	2006 VW_{71}	—	November 11, 2006	Mount Lemmon	Mount Lemmon Survey	·	4.0 km	MPC · JPL
304602	2006 VQ_{73}	—	November 11, 2006	Mount Lemmon	Mount Lemmon Survey	THM	2.4 km	MPC · JPL
304603	2006 VW_{74}	—	November 11, 2006	Mount Lemmon	Mount Lemmon Survey	·	2.4 km	MPC · JPL
304604	2006 VF_{75}	—	November 11, 2006	Kitt Peak	Spacewatch	·	2.3 km	MPC · JPL
304605	2006 VD_{77}	—	November 12, 2006	Mount Lemmon	Mount Lemmon Survey	·	1.9 km	MPC · JPL
304606	2006 VM_{81}	—	November 12, 2006	Lulin	Lin, H.-C., Q. Ye	·	2.3 km	MPC · JPL
304607	2006 VG_{83}	—	November 13, 2006	Kitt Peak	Spacewatch	·	2.4 km	MPC · JPL
304608	2006 VQ_{83}	—	November 13, 2006	Kitt Peak	Spacewatch	(16286)	1.8 km	MPC · JPL
304609	2006 VD_{84}	—	November 13, 2006	Mount Lemmon	Mount Lemmon Survey	·	1.8 km	MPC · JPL
304610	2006 VS_{84}	—	November 13, 2006	Mount Lemmon	Mount Lemmon Survey	EOS	2.3 km	MPC · JPL
304611	2006 VY_{85}	—	November 14, 2006	Kitt Peak	Spacewatch	·	2.7 km	MPC · JPL
304612	2006 VX_{86}	—	November 14, 2006	Mount Lemmon	Mount Lemmon Survey	EOS	2.1 km	MPC · JPL
304613	2006 VV_{88}	—	November 14, 2006	Mount Lemmon	Mount Lemmon Survey	·	3.1 km	MPC · JPL
304614	2006 VT_{96}	—	November 10, 2006	Kitt Peak	Spacewatch	·	3.5 km	MPC · JPL
304615	2006 VO_{99}	—	November 11, 2006	Mount Lemmon	Mount Lemmon Survey	·	2.6 km	MPC · JPL
304616	2006 VK_{105}	—	November 13, 2006	Kitt Peak	Spacewatch	EOS	2.0 km	MPC · JPL
304617	2006 VW_{106}	—	November 13, 2006	Catalina	CSS	·	3.3 km	MPC · JPL
304618	2006 VH_{109}	—	November 13, 2006	Palomar	NEAT	TIR	4.2 km	MPC · JPL
304619	2006 VA_{110}	—	November 13, 2006	Catalina	CSS	·	3.1 km	MPC · JPL
304620	2006 VD_{114}	—	November 14, 2006	Kitt Peak	Spacewatch	KOR	1.4 km	MPC · JPL
304621	2006 VO_{114}	—	November 14, 2006	Mount Lemmon	Mount Lemmon Survey	VER	2.4 km	MPC · JPL
304622	2006 VO_{118}	—	November 14, 2006	Kitt Peak	Spacewatch	·	1.9 km	MPC · JPL
304623	2006 VN_{128}	—	November 15, 2006	Kitt Peak	Spacewatch	·	2.9 km	MPC · JPL
304624	2006 VB_{134}	—	November 15, 2006	Mount Lemmon	Mount Lemmon Survey	·	2.4 km	MPC · JPL
304625	2006 VJ_{136}	—	November 15, 2006	Kitt Peak	Spacewatch	·	4.2 km	MPC · JPL
304626	2006 VA_{138}	—	November 15, 2006	Kitt Peak	Spacewatch	EOS	1.9 km	MPC · JPL
304627	2006 VM_{139}	—	November 15, 2006	Kitt Peak	Spacewatch	EOS	2.8 km	MPC · JPL
304628	2006 VP_{139}	—	November 15, 2006	Kitt Peak	Spacewatch	EOS	2.6 km	MPC · JPL
304629	2006 VA_{140}	—	November 15, 2006	Kitt Peak	Spacewatch	·	2.5 km	MPC · JPL
304630	2006 VR_{140}	—	November 15, 2006	Kitt Peak	Spacewatch	·	2.5 km	MPC · JPL
304631	2006 VA_{141}	—	November 15, 2006	Kitt Peak	Spacewatch	·	3.3 km	MPC · JPL
304632	2006 VT_{141}	—	November 13, 2006	Kitt Peak	Spacewatch	·	2.2 km	MPC · JPL
304633	2006 VN_{148}	—	November 15, 2006	Kitt Peak	Spacewatch	·	2.9 km	MPC · JPL
304634	2006 VU_{149}	—	November 9, 2006	Palomar	NEAT	·	2.6 km	MPC · JPL
304635	2006 VK_{150}	—	November 9, 2006	Palomar	NEAT	·	4.0 km	MPC · JPL
304636	2006 VM_{152}	—	November 9, 2006	Palomar	NEAT	·	4.5 km	MPC · JPL
304637	2006 VU_{155}	—	August 31, 2000	Kitt Peak	Spacewatch	·	2.7 km	MPC · JPL
304638	2006 VA_{169}	—	November 15, 2006	Kitt Peak	Spacewatch	·	2.8 km	MPC · JPL
304639	2006 VD_{171}	—	November 11, 2006	Mount Lemmon	Mount Lemmon Survey	·	3.3 km	MPC · JPL
304640	2006 WW_{1}	—	November 19, 2006	Kitt Peak	Spacewatch	APO	520 m	MPC · JPL
304641	2006 WY_{1}	—	November 18, 2006	La Sagra	OAM	·	3.5 km	MPC · JPL
304642	2006 WL_{5}	—	November 16, 2006	Kitt Peak	Spacewatch	·	4.1 km	MPC · JPL
304643	2006 WM_{8}	—	November 16, 2006	Kitt Peak	Spacewatch	·	2.5 km	MPC · JPL
304644	2006 WU_{8}	—	November 16, 2006	Kitt Peak	Spacewatch	·	4.3 km	MPC · JPL
304645	2006 WY_{8}	—	November 16, 2006	Kitt Peak	Spacewatch	·	3.1 km	MPC · JPL
304646	2006 WP_{11}	—	November 16, 2006	Socorro	LINEAR	H	750 m	MPC · JPL
304647	2006 WY_{11}	—	November 16, 2006	Mount Lemmon	Mount Lemmon Survey	·	4.7 km	MPC · JPL
304648	2006 WM_{14}	—	November 16, 2006	Mount Lemmon	Mount Lemmon Survey	·	3.2 km	MPC · JPL
304649	2006 WZ_{14}	—	November 16, 2006	Kitt Peak	Spacewatch	·	3.2 km	MPC · JPL
304650	2006 WS_{16}	—	November 17, 2006	Kitt Peak	Spacewatch	·	5.6 km	MPC · JPL
304651	2006 WN_{22}	—	November 17, 2006	Mount Lemmon	Mount Lemmon Survey	·	2.8 km	MPC · JPL
304652	2006 WC_{23}	—	November 17, 2006	Mount Lemmon	Mount Lemmon Survey	·	3.1 km	MPC · JPL
304653	2006 WF_{25}	—	November 17, 2006	Mount Lemmon	Mount Lemmon Survey	·	3.7 km	MPC · JPL
304654	2006 WB_{26}	—	November 18, 2006	Mount Lemmon	Mount Lemmon Survey	AGN	1.8 km	MPC · JPL
304655	2006 WL_{26}	—	October 13, 2006	Kitt Peak	Spacewatch	·	2.0 km	MPC · JPL
304656	2006 WW_{27}	—	November 22, 2006	7300	W. K. Y. Yeung	·	4.7 km	MPC · JPL
304657	2006 WY_{27}	—	November 22, 2006	7300	W. K. Y. Yeung	EOS	2.7 km	MPC · JPL
304658	2006 WV_{30}	—	November 23, 2006	Kitt Peak	Spacewatch	·	3.9 km	MPC · JPL
304659	2006 WR_{33}	—	November 16, 2006	Kitt Peak	Spacewatch	·	3.4 km	MPC · JPL
304660	2006 WS_{49}	—	November 16, 2006	Kitt Peak	Spacewatch	·	2.9 km	MPC · JPL
304661	2006 WW_{49}	—	November 16, 2006	Kitt Peak	Spacewatch	·	2.5 km	MPC · JPL
304662	2006 WZ_{54}	—	November 16, 2006	Kitt Peak	Spacewatch	·	2.9 km	MPC · JPL
304663	2006 WL_{59}	—	November 17, 2006	Kitt Peak	Spacewatch	·	3.3 km	MPC · JPL
304664	2006 WK_{69}	—	November 17, 2006	Kitt Peak	Spacewatch	·	7.7 km	MPC · JPL
304665	2006 WB_{70}	—	November 18, 2006	Kitt Peak	Spacewatch	·	1.7 km	MPC · JPL
304666	2006 WW_{72}	—	November 18, 2006	Kitt Peak	Spacewatch	·	1.9 km	MPC · JPL
304667	2006 WY_{72}	—	November 18, 2006	Kitt Peak	Spacewatch	·	2.6 km	MPC · JPL
304668	2006 WA_{78}	—	November 18, 2006	Kitt Peak	Spacewatch	·	3.3 km	MPC · JPL
304669	2006 WK_{92}	—	November 19, 2006	Kitt Peak	Spacewatch	·	3.8 km	MPC · JPL
304670	2006 WC_{93}	—	November 19, 2006	Kitt Peak	Spacewatch	·	2.8 km	MPC · JPL
304671	2006 WA_{95}	—	November 19, 2006	Kitt Peak	Spacewatch	EOS	2.0 km	MPC · JPL
304672	2006 WH_{95}	—	November 19, 2006	Kitt Peak	Spacewatch	·	2.2 km	MPC · JPL
304673	2006 WP_{95}	—	November 19, 2006	Kitt Peak	Spacewatch	THM	2.2 km	MPC · JPL
304674	2006 WZ_{95}	—	November 19, 2006	Kitt Peak	Spacewatch	·	2.0 km	MPC · JPL
304675	2006 WU_{98}	—	November 19, 2006	Kitt Peak	Spacewatch	·	4.5 km	MPC · JPL
304676	2006 WH_{101}	—	November 19, 2006	Socorro	LINEAR	·	3.7 km	MPC · JPL
304677	2006 WK_{103}	—	November 19, 2006	Kitt Peak	Spacewatch	HYG	3.4 km	MPC · JPL
304678	2006 WJ_{104}	—	November 19, 2006	Kitt Peak	Spacewatch	·	1.9 km	MPC · JPL
304679	2006 WM_{108}	—	November 19, 2006	Kitt Peak	Spacewatch	·	2.9 km	MPC · JPL
304680	2006 WP_{109}	—	November 19, 2006	Kitt Peak	Spacewatch	·	2.0 km	MPC · JPL
304681	2006 WV_{109}	—	November 19, 2006	Kitt Peak	Spacewatch	·	3.7 km	MPC · JPL
304682	2006 WU_{111}	—	November 19, 2006	Socorro	LINEAR	·	3.8 km	MPC · JPL
304683	2006 WW_{120}	—	November 21, 2006	Socorro	LINEAR	EOS	3.1 km	MPC · JPL
304684	2006 WM_{126}	—	November 22, 2006	Catalina	CSS	·	2.1 km	MPC · JPL
304685	2006 WK_{137}	—	November 19, 2006	Kitt Peak	Spacewatch	·	3.0 km	MPC · JPL
304686	2006 WY_{139}	—	November 19, 2006	Kitt Peak	Spacewatch	THM	1.8 km	MPC · JPL
304687	2006 WC_{145}	—	November 20, 2006	Kitt Peak	Spacewatch	·	2.7 km	MPC · JPL
304688	2006 WZ_{147}	—	November 20, 2006	Kitt Peak	Spacewatch	·	2.7 km	MPC · JPL
304689	2006 WP_{148}	—	November 20, 2006	Kitt Peak	Spacewatch	EOS	2.9 km	MPC · JPL
304690	2006 WM_{149}	—	March 12, 2003	Palomar	NEAT	EOS	2.6 km	MPC · JPL
304691	2006 WC_{162}	—	November 23, 2006	Kitt Peak	Spacewatch	·	4.2 km	MPC · JPL
304692	2006 WJ_{162}	—	November 23, 2006	Kitt Peak	Spacewatch	·	2.7 km	MPC · JPL
304693	2006 WF_{166}	—	November 23, 2006	Kitt Peak	Spacewatch	·	3.7 km	MPC · JPL
304694	2006 WC_{167}	—	November 23, 2006	Kitt Peak	Spacewatch	·	3.5 km	MPC · JPL
304695	2006 WU_{169}	—	November 23, 2006	Kitt Peak	Spacewatch	·	5.0 km	MPC · JPL
304696	2006 WR_{171}	—	November 23, 2006	Kitt Peak	Spacewatch	·	2.4 km	MPC · JPL
304697	2006 WM_{172}	—	November 23, 2006	Kitt Peak	Spacewatch	EOS	2.6 km	MPC · JPL
304698	2006 WQ_{174}	—	November 23, 2006	Kitt Peak	Spacewatch	VER	3.4 km	MPC · JPL
304699	2006 WA_{175}	—	November 23, 2006	Kitt Peak	Spacewatch	·	1.6 km	MPC · JPL
304700	2006 WF_{175}	—	November 23, 2006	Kitt Peak	Spacewatch	·	3.0 km	MPC · JPL

== 304701–304800 ==
back to top

Designation			Discovery			Properties		Ref
Permanent	Provisional	Named after	Date	Site	Discoverer(s)	Category	Diam.	Ref
304701	2006 WJ_{177}	—	November 23, 2006	Mount Lemmon	Mount Lemmon Survey	·	2.6 km	MPC · JPL
304702	2006 WT_{179}	—	November 24, 2006	Mount Lemmon	Mount Lemmon Survey	·	2.9 km	MPC · JPL
304703	2006 WL_{187}	—	November 23, 2006	Mount Lemmon	Mount Lemmon Survey	·	2.8 km	MPC · JPL
304704	2006 WO_{189}	—	November 25, 2006	Mount Lemmon	Mount Lemmon Survey	·	2.2 km	MPC · JPL
304705	2006 WW_{193}	—	November 27, 2006	Mount Lemmon	Mount Lemmon Survey	THM	2.4 km	MPC · JPL
304706	2006 WU_{194}	—	November 29, 2006	Socorro	LINEAR	·	5.6 km	MPC · JPL
304707	2006 WD_{195}	—	November 29, 2006	Socorro	LINEAR	·	5.4 km	MPC · JPL
304708	2006 WB_{198}	—	November 19, 2006	Kitt Peak	Spacewatch	·	4.0 km	MPC · JPL
304709	2006 WR_{198}	—	November 19, 2006	Catalina	CSS	·	3.6 km	MPC · JPL
304710	2006 WE_{199}	—	November 25, 2006	Kitt Peak	Spacewatch	·	4.3 km	MPC · JPL
304711	2006 WO_{199}	—	November 19, 2006	Kitt Peak	Spacewatch	·	2.0 km	MPC · JPL
304712	2006 WB_{200}	—	November 17, 2006	Kitt Peak	Spacewatch	VER	3.4 km	MPC · JPL
304713	2006 WL_{203}	—	November 25, 2006	Mount Lemmon	Mount Lemmon Survey	·	3.5 km	MPC · JPL
304714	2006 XB_{3}	—	December 11, 2006	7300	W. K. Y. Yeung	KOR	1.5 km	MPC · JPL
304715	2006 XG_{5}	—	December 1, 2006	Mount Lemmon	Mount Lemmon Survey	TIR	4.3 km	MPC · JPL
304716	2006 XH_{5}	—	December 1, 2006	Mount Lemmon	Mount Lemmon Survey	·	4.9 km	MPC · JPL
304717	2006 XU_{5}	—	December 7, 2006	Palomar	NEAT	LIX	4.5 km	MPC · JPL
304718	2006 XA_{7}	—	December 9, 2006	Kitt Peak	Spacewatch	·	4.8 km	MPC · JPL
304719	2006 XT_{14}	—	December 10, 2006	Kitt Peak	Spacewatch	·	2.9 km	MPC · JPL
304720	2006 XA_{16}	—	December 10, 2006	Kitt Peak	Spacewatch	LUT	6.7 km	MPC · JPL
304721	2006 XZ_{18}	—	December 11, 2006	Socorro	LINEAR	·	5.7 km	MPC · JPL
304722	2006 XZ_{21}	—	December 12, 2006	Kitt Peak	Spacewatch	·	3.7 km	MPC · JPL
304723	2006 XR_{23}	—	December 12, 2006	Mount Lemmon	Mount Lemmon Survey	·	3.7 km	MPC · JPL
304724	2006 XC_{25}	—	December 12, 2006	Mount Lemmon	Mount Lemmon Survey	·	3.3 km	MPC · JPL
304725	2006 XA_{26}	—	December 12, 2006	Catalina	CSS	·	4.2 km	MPC · JPL
304726	2006 XS_{26}	—	December 12, 2006	Catalina	CSS	·	3.5 km	MPC · JPL
304727	2006 XR_{27}	—	December 13, 2006	Kitt Peak	Spacewatch	EOS	3.0 km	MPC · JPL
304728	2006 XC_{29}	—	December 13, 2006	Mount Lemmon	Mount Lemmon Survey	EOS	2.0 km	MPC · JPL
304729	2006 XF_{31}	—	December 15, 2006	Farra d'Isonzo	Farra d'Isonzo	·	3.4 km	MPC · JPL
304730	2006 XJ_{32}	—	December 9, 2006	Kitt Peak	Spacewatch	·	3.0 km	MPC · JPL
304731	2006 XR_{34}	—	December 11, 2006	Kitt Peak	Spacewatch	EUP	5.0 km	MPC · JPL
304732	2006 XF_{37}	—	December 11, 2006	Kitt Peak	Spacewatch	·	4.3 km	MPC · JPL
304733	2006 XE_{38}	—	December 11, 2006	Kitt Peak	Spacewatch	·	3.2 km	MPC · JPL
304734	2006 XH_{38}	—	December 11, 2006	Kitt Peak	Spacewatch	·	3.5 km	MPC · JPL
304735	2006 XY_{39}	—	December 12, 2006	Kitt Peak	Spacewatch	·	2.5 km	MPC · JPL
304736	2006 XQ_{40}	—	December 12, 2006	Kitt Peak	Spacewatch	·	3.2 km	MPC · JPL
304737	2006 XK_{46}	—	December 13, 2006	Catalina	CSS	·	3.5 km	MPC · JPL
304738	2006 XO_{47}	—	December 13, 2006	Mount Lemmon	Mount Lemmon Survey	·	2.9 km	MPC · JPL
304739	2006 XE_{57}	—	December 13, 2006	Mount Lemmon	Mount Lemmon Survey	·	1.6 km	MPC · JPL
304740	2006 XC_{65}	—	December 12, 2006	Palomar	NEAT	·	4.8 km	MPC · JPL
304741	2006 XT_{65}	—	December 12, 2006	Palomar	NEAT	·	4.6 km	MPC · JPL
304742	2006 XC_{70}	—	December 13, 2006	Mount Lemmon	Mount Lemmon Survey	·	3.1 km	MPC · JPL
304743	2006 XQ_{71}	—	December 13, 2006	Mount Lemmon	Mount Lemmon Survey	THM	2.2 km	MPC · JPL
304744	2006 XZ_{71}	—	December 10, 2006	Kitt Peak	Spacewatch	·	3.0 km	MPC · JPL
304745	2006 YR_{3}	—	December 16, 2006	Mount Lemmon	Mount Lemmon Survey	·	4.6 km	MPC · JPL
304746	2006 YD_{5}	—	December 17, 2006	Mount Lemmon	Mount Lemmon Survey	·	2.3 km	MPC · JPL
304747	2006 YL_{10}	—	December 21, 2006	Anderson Mesa	LONEOS	H	810 m	MPC · JPL
304748	2006 YE_{14}	—	December 22, 2006	Piszkés-tető	K. Sárneczky, J. Szulágyi	·	3.3 km	MPC · JPL
304749	2006 YZ_{17}	—	November 16, 2006	Kitt Peak	Spacewatch	EOS	2.6 km	MPC · JPL
304750	2006 YJ_{20}	—	December 21, 2006	Kitt Peak	Spacewatch	KOR	1.6 km	MPC · JPL
304751	2006 YX_{21}	—	December 21, 2006	Kitt Peak	Spacewatch	·	2.3 km	MPC · JPL
304752	2006 YK_{38}	—	December 21, 2006	Kitt Peak	Spacewatch	·	6.4 km	MPC · JPL
304753	2006 YO_{47}	—	December 23, 2006	Mount Lemmon	Mount Lemmon Survey	·	3.9 km	MPC · JPL
304754	2006 YT_{52}	—	December 21, 2006	Mount Lemmon	Mount Lemmon Survey	HYG	3.3 km	MPC · JPL
304755	2007 AW_{10}	—	January 8, 2007	Catalina	CSS	TIR	4.0 km	MPC · JPL
304756	2007 AS_{11}	—	January 9, 2007	Kitt Peak	Spacewatch	·	2.3 km	MPC · JPL
304757	2007 AB_{19}	—	January 15, 2007	Catalina	CSS	LIX	4.5 km	MPC · JPL
304758	2007 AC_{19}	—	January 15, 2007	Catalina	CSS	·	4.4 km	MPC · JPL
304759	2007 BO_{16}	—	January 17, 2007	Mount Lemmon	Mount Lemmon Survey	·	3.2 km	MPC · JPL
304760	2007 BG_{21}	—	January 24, 2007	Socorro	LINEAR	·	3.1 km	MPC · JPL
304761	2007 BV_{26}	—	January 24, 2007	Mount Lemmon	Mount Lemmon Survey	THM	2.3 km	MPC · JPL
304762	2007 CH	—	February 6, 2007	Palomar	NEAT	H	690 m	MPC · JPL
304763	2007 CQ_{25}	—	February 9, 2007	Kitt Peak	Spacewatch	·	2.7 km	MPC · JPL
304764	2007 CF_{43}	—	February 8, 2007	Palomar	NEAT	·	3.4 km	MPC · JPL
304765	2007 DW_{4}	—	February 17, 2007	Kitt Peak	Spacewatch	·	4.9 km	MPC · JPL
304766	2007 DW_{14}	—	February 17, 2007	Kitt Peak	Spacewatch	·	2.8 km	MPC · JPL
304767	2007 DA_{38}	—	February 17, 2007	Kitt Peak	Spacewatch	·	1 km	MPC · JPL
304768	2007 DB_{40}	—	February 19, 2007	Kitt Peak	Spacewatch	·	2.6 km	MPC · JPL
304769	2007 DV_{77}	—	February 23, 2007	Kitt Peak	Spacewatch	THM	2.6 km	MPC · JPL
304770	2007 EO_{67}	—	March 10, 2007	Kitt Peak	Spacewatch	L5	17 km	MPC · JPL
304771	2007 EX_{149}	—	March 12, 2007	Mount Lemmon	Mount Lemmon Survey	·	1.0 km	MPC · JPL
304772	2007 EQ_{184}	—	March 13, 2007	Catalina	CSS	H	660 m	MPC · JPL
304773	2007 EF_{188}	—	March 13, 2007	Kitt Peak	Spacewatch	L5	10 km	MPC · JPL
304774	2007 GZ_{30}	—	April 14, 2007	Mount Lemmon	Mount Lemmon Survey	L5	11 km	MPC · JPL
304775	2007 GY_{46}	—	April 14, 2007	Kitt Peak	Spacewatch	·	920 m	MPC · JPL
304776	2007 GZ_{62}	—	April 15, 2007	Kitt Peak	Spacewatch	·	1.1 km	MPC · JPL
304777	2007 HB_{12}	—	April 18, 2007	Mount Lemmon	Mount Lemmon Survey	·	1.6 km	MPC · JPL
304778	2007 HL_{17}	—	April 16, 2007	Catalina	CSS	·	850 m	MPC · JPL
304779	2007 JY_{43}	—	April 25, 2007	Kitt Peak	Spacewatch	·	850 m	MPC · JPL
304780	2007 LO_{21}	—	June 12, 2007	Kitt Peak	Spacewatch	·	1.4 km	MPC · JPL
304781	2007 LM_{31}	—	June 14, 2007	Siding Spring	SSS	·	1.4 km	MPC · JPL
304782	2007 MX_{3}	—	June 18, 2007	Catalina	CSS	·	1.8 km	MPC · JPL
304783	2007 MN_{7}	—	June 18, 2007	Kitt Peak	Spacewatch	·	1.1 km	MPC · JPL
304784	2007 MT_{15}	—	June 20, 2007	Kitt Peak	Spacewatch	·	910 m	MPC · JPL
304785	2007 MK_{19}	—	June 21, 2007	Mount Lemmon	Mount Lemmon Survey	·	1.4 km	MPC · JPL
304786	2007 ME_{26}	—	June 23, 2007	Siding Spring	SSS	·	1.6 km	MPC · JPL
304787	2007 NF_{1}	—	July 11, 2007	Reedy Creek	J. Broughton	·	1.4 km	MPC · JPL
304788 Cresques	2007 NZ_{1}	Cresques	July 13, 2007	La Sagra	OAM	·	1.8 km	MPC · JPL
304789	2007 NS_{3}	—	July 12, 2007	Reedy Creek	J. Broughton	(1338) (FLO)	890 m	MPC · JPL
304790	2007 NE_{5}	—	July 15, 2007	Tiki	S. F. Hönig, Teamo, N.	MAS	880 m	MPC · JPL
304791	2007 NN_{7}	—	July 15, 2007	Siding Spring	SSS	·	2.1 km	MPC · JPL
304792	2007 OD	—	July 16, 2007	La Sagra	OAM	·	1.7 km	MPC · JPL
304793	2007 OP_{9}	—	July 24, 2007	Črni Vrh	Matičič, S.	·	2.0 km	MPC · JPL
304794	2007 PW_{2}	—	August 7, 2007	Reedy Creek	J. Broughton	NYS	1.3 km	MPC · JPL
304795	2007 PD_{3}	—	August 4, 2007	Siding Spring	SSS	·	1.0 km	MPC · JPL
304796	2007 PS_{6}	—	August 9, 2007	Tiki	S. F. Hönig, Teamo, N.	·	1.6 km	MPC · JPL
304797	2007 PW_{6}	—	August 9, 2007	Socorro	LINEAR	·	1.3 km	MPC · JPL
304798	2007 PF_{8}	—	August 6, 2007	Reedy Creek	J. Broughton	·	1.8 km	MPC · JPL
304799	2007 PK_{10}	—	August 9, 2007	Socorro	LINEAR	·	1.4 km	MPC · JPL
304800	2007 PH_{12}	—	August 10, 2007	Tiki	S. F. Hönig, Teamo, N.	·	1.5 km	MPC · JPL

== 304801–304900 ==
back to top

Designation			Discovery			Properties		Ref
Permanent	Provisional	Named after	Date	Site	Discoverer(s)	Category	Diam.	Ref
304801	2007 PN_{14}	—	August 8, 2007	Socorro	LINEAR	NYS	1.2 km	MPC · JPL
304802	2007 PV_{14}	—	August 8, 2007	Socorro	LINEAR	·	1.5 km	MPC · JPL
304803	2007 PN_{15}	—	August 8, 2007	Socorro	LINEAR	NYS	1.3 km	MPC · JPL
304804	2007 PY_{20}	—	August 9, 2007	Socorro	LINEAR	·	1.6 km	MPC · JPL
304805	2007 PD_{27}	—	August 9, 2007	Palomar	Palomar	·	1.3 km	MPC · JPL
304806	2007 PA_{35}	—	August 9, 2007	Socorro	LINEAR	NYS	1.2 km	MPC · JPL
304807	2007 PQ_{35}	—	August 10, 2007	Kitt Peak	Spacewatch	·	1.2 km	MPC · JPL
304808	2007 PM_{36}	—	August 13, 2007	Socorro	LINEAR	·	1.3 km	MPC · JPL
304809	2007 PB_{41}	—	August 13, 2007	Socorro	LINEAR	·	2.1 km	MPC · JPL
304810	2007 PU_{42}	—	August 9, 2007	Socorro	LINEAR	NYS	1.3 km	MPC · JPL
304811	2007 PJ_{45}	—	August 10, 2007	Kitt Peak	Spacewatch	·	1.5 km	MPC · JPL
304812	2007 PO_{47}	—	August 9, 2007	Kitt Peak	Spacewatch	·	920 m	MPC · JPL
304813 Cesarina	2007 QA	Cesarina	August 16, 2007	San Marcello	M. Mazzucato, Dolfi, F.	·	1.2 km	MPC · JPL
304814	2007 QQ_{5}	—	August 18, 2007	Purple Mountain	PMO NEO Survey Program	·	1.2 km	MPC · JPL
304815	2007 QE_{9}	—	August 22, 2007	Anderson Mesa	LONEOS	·	940 m	MPC · JPL
304816	2007 QE_{10}	—	August 22, 2007	Socorro	LINEAR	·	1.0 km	MPC · JPL
304817	2007 QV_{10}	—	August 23, 2007	Kitt Peak	Spacewatch	PHO	1.0 km	MPC · JPL
304818	2007 QA_{11}	—	August 23, 2007	Kitt Peak	Spacewatch	·	1.2 km	MPC · JPL
304819	2007 QC_{11}	—	August 23, 2007	Kitt Peak	Spacewatch	·	1.4 km	MPC · JPL
304820	2007 QF_{16}	—	August 23, 2007	Kitt Peak	Spacewatch	·	1.2 km	MPC · JPL
304821	2007 RB	—	September 1, 2007	Eskridge	G. Hug	NYS	1.2 km	MPC · JPL
304822	2007 RU	—	September 2, 2007	Pla D'Arguines	R. Ferrando	·	1.1 km	MPC · JPL
304823	2007 RR_{5}	—	September 5, 2007	Dauban	Chante-Perdrix	·	1.4 km	MPC · JPL
304824	2007 RL_{14}	—	September 11, 2007	Remanzacco	Remanzacco	·	1.8 km	MPC · JPL
304825	2007 RA_{18}	—	September 13, 2007	Bisei SG Center	BATTeRS	·	1.4 km	MPC · JPL
304826 Kini	2007 RM_{19}	Kini	September 5, 2007	Lulin	Q. Ye, H.-C. Lin	MAS	820 m	MPC · JPL
304827	2007 RU_{20}	—	September 3, 2007	Catalina	CSS	NYS	1.5 km	MPC · JPL
304828	2007 RD_{21}	—	September 3, 2007	Catalina	CSS	·	1.3 km	MPC · JPL
304829	2007 RO_{21}	—	September 3, 2007	Catalina	CSS	MAS	790 m	MPC · JPL
304830	2007 RY_{22}	—	September 3, 2007	Catalina	CSS	NYS	1.1 km	MPC · JPL
304831	2007 RQ_{23}	—	September 3, 2007	Catalina	CSS	NYS	1.1 km	MPC · JPL
304832	2007 RW_{23}	—	September 3, 2007	Catalina	CSS	·	1.8 km	MPC · JPL
304833	2007 RB_{24}	—	September 3, 2007	Catalina	CSS	·	1.5 km	MPC · JPL
304834	2007 RR_{25}	—	September 4, 2007	Mount Lemmon	Mount Lemmon Survey	MAS	740 m	MPC · JPL
304835	2007 RW_{27}	—	September 4, 2007	Catalina	CSS	·	1.7 km	MPC · JPL
304836	2007 RP_{28}	—	September 4, 2007	Catalina	CSS	·	2.0 km	MPC · JPL
304837	2007 RK_{32}	—	September 5, 2007	Catalina	CSS	·	2.1 km	MPC · JPL
304838	2007 RM_{32}	—	September 5, 2007	Catalina	CSS	·	1.8 km	MPC · JPL
304839	2007 RO_{32}	—	September 5, 2007	Catalina	CSS	·	1.5 km	MPC · JPL
304840	2007 RJ_{36}	—	September 8, 2007	Anderson Mesa	LONEOS	·	1.7 km	MPC · JPL
304841	2007 RU_{37}	—	September 8, 2007	Anderson Mesa	LONEOS	MAS	870 m	MPC · JPL
304842	2007 RJ_{39}	—	September 8, 2007	Catalina	CSS	GAL	2.3 km	MPC · JPL
304843	2007 RF_{40}	—	September 9, 2007	Kitt Peak	Spacewatch	NYS	1.1 km	MPC · JPL
304844	2007 RD_{41}	—	September 9, 2007	Anderson Mesa	LONEOS	NYS	1.4 km	MPC · JPL
304845	2007 RO_{41}	—	September 9, 2007	Anderson Mesa	LONEOS	V	850 m	MPC · JPL
304846	2007 RM_{49}	—	September 9, 2007	Mount Lemmon	Mount Lemmon Survey	·	1.0 km	MPC · JPL
304847	2007 RY_{52}	—	September 9, 2007	Kitt Peak	Spacewatch	·	1.7 km	MPC · JPL
304848	2007 RD_{55}	—	September 9, 2007	Kitt Peak	Spacewatch	·	1.1 km	MPC · JPL
304849	2007 RR_{55}	—	September 9, 2007	Kitt Peak	Spacewatch	·	1.6 km	MPC · JPL
304850	2007 RH_{57}	—	September 9, 2007	Kitt Peak	Spacewatch	·	1.5 km	MPC · JPL
304851	2007 RJ_{59}	—	September 10, 2007	Kitt Peak	Spacewatch	·	1.3 km	MPC · JPL
304852	2007 RF_{68}	—	September 10, 2007	Kitt Peak	Spacewatch	MAS	840 m	MPC · JPL
304853	2007 RO_{68}	—	September 10, 2007	Kitt Peak	Spacewatch	·	1.4 km	MPC · JPL
304854	2007 RW_{68}	—	September 10, 2007	Kitt Peak	Spacewatch	MAS	930 m	MPC · JPL
304855	2007 RZ_{68}	—	September 10, 2007	Kitt Peak	Spacewatch	·	1.3 km	MPC · JPL
304856	2007 RA_{71}	—	September 10, 2007	Kitt Peak	Spacewatch	V	650 m	MPC · JPL
304857	2007 RP_{72}	—	September 10, 2007	Mount Lemmon	Mount Lemmon Survey	·	1.6 km	MPC · JPL
304858	2007 RQ_{77}	—	September 10, 2007	Mount Lemmon	Mount Lemmon Survey	CLA	2.2 km	MPC · JPL
304859	2007 RS_{80}	—	September 10, 2007	Mount Lemmon	Mount Lemmon Survey	MAR	1.1 km	MPC · JPL
304860	2007 RF_{93}	—	September 10, 2007	Kitt Peak	Spacewatch	·	2.1 km	MPC · JPL
304861	2007 RY_{95}	—	September 10, 2007	Kitt Peak	Spacewatch	·	1.2 km	MPC · JPL
304862	2007 RM_{97}	—	September 10, 2007	Kitt Peak	Spacewatch	·	1.4 km	MPC · JPL
304863	2007 RS_{97}	—	September 10, 2007	Kitt Peak	Spacewatch	MAS	920 m	MPC · JPL
304864	2007 RW_{98}	—	September 10, 2007	Kitt Peak	Spacewatch	·	1.6 km	MPC · JPL
304865	2007 RF_{107}	—	September 11, 2007	Mount Lemmon	Mount Lemmon Survey	V	840 m	MPC · JPL
304866	2007 RU_{114}	—	September 11, 2007	Kitt Peak	Spacewatch	·	1.5 km	MPC · JPL
304867	2007 RU_{116}	—	September 11, 2007	Kitt Peak	Spacewatch	·	1.2 km	MPC · JPL
304868	2007 RL_{131}	—	September 12, 2007	Kitt Peak	Spacewatch	·	1.3 km	MPC · JPL
304869	2007 RO_{131}	—	September 12, 2007	Kitt Peak	Spacewatch	NYS	1.7 km	MPC · JPL
304870	2007 RS_{137}	—	September 14, 2007	Anderson Mesa	LONEOS	·	1.3 km	MPC · JPL
304871	2007 RA_{141}	—	September 13, 2007	Socorro	LINEAR	NYS	1.5 km	MPC · JPL
304872	2007 RN_{142}	—	September 13, 2007	Socorro	LINEAR	·	1.7 km	MPC · JPL
304873	2007 RD_{148}	—	September 11, 2007	Purple Mountain	PMO NEO Survey Program	·	1.6 km	MPC · JPL
304874	2007 RV_{148}	—	September 12, 2007	Catalina	CSS	·	2.0 km	MPC · JPL
304875	2007 RH_{149}	—	September 12, 2007	Anderson Mesa	LONEOS	·	1.3 km	MPC · JPL
304876	2007 RR_{151}	—	September 10, 2007	Kitt Peak	Spacewatch	·	1.1 km	MPC · JPL
304877	2007 RF_{158}	—	September 5, 2007	Catalina	CSS	·	1.2 km	MPC · JPL
304878	2007 RO_{158}	—	September 12, 2007	Catalina	CSS	MAS	1.0 km	MPC · JPL
304879	2007 RE_{161}	—	September 13, 2007	Mount Lemmon	Mount Lemmon Survey	·	1.1 km	MPC · JPL
304880	2007 RD_{166}	—	September 10, 2007	Kitt Peak	Spacewatch	·	1.1 km	MPC · JPL
304881	2007 RB_{168}	—	September 10, 2007	Kitt Peak	Spacewatch	MAS	830 m	MPC · JPL
304882	2007 RS_{168}	—	September 10, 2007	Kitt Peak	Spacewatch	NYS	1.1 km	MPC · JPL
304883	2007 RZ_{174}	—	September 10, 2007	Kitt Peak	Spacewatch	·	1.6 km	MPC · JPL
304884	2007 RW_{175}	—	September 8, 2007	Mount Lemmon	Mount Lemmon Survey	·	1.5 km	MPC · JPL
304885	2007 RV_{176}	—	September 10, 2007	Mount Lemmon	Mount Lemmon Survey	MAS	940 m	MPC · JPL
304886	2007 RN_{179}	—	September 10, 2007	Mount Lemmon	Mount Lemmon Survey	(5)	1.2 km	MPC · JPL
304887	2007 RY_{182}	—	September 12, 2007	Catalina	CSS	·	2.0 km	MPC · JPL
304888	2007 RE_{189}	—	September 10, 2007	Kitt Peak	Spacewatch	·	1.2 km	MPC · JPL
304889	2007 RR_{193}	—	September 12, 2007	Kitt Peak	Spacewatch	NYS	1.4 km	MPC · JPL
304890	2007 RR_{198}	—	September 13, 2007	Mount Lemmon	Mount Lemmon Survey	MAS	810 m	MPC · JPL
304891	2007 RK_{199}	—	September 13, 2007	Catalina	CSS	·	1.1 km	MPC · JPL
304892	2007 RR_{200}	—	September 13, 2007	Kitt Peak	Spacewatch	·	1.2 km	MPC · JPL
304893	2007 RX_{200}	—	September 13, 2007	Kitt Peak	Spacewatch	·	1.2 km	MPC · JPL
304894	2007 RJ_{209}	—	September 10, 2007	Kitt Peak	Spacewatch	PHO	970 m	MPC · JPL
304895	2007 RJ_{213}	—	September 12, 2007	Mount Lemmon	Mount Lemmon Survey	NYS	1.2 km	MPC · JPL
304896	2007 RS_{223}	—	September 8, 2007	Mount Lemmon	Mount Lemmon Survey	JUN	1.1 km	MPC · JPL
304897	2007 RG_{225}	—	September 10, 2007	Kitt Peak	Spacewatch	·	1.0 km	MPC · JPL
304898	2007 RE_{228}	—	September 10, 2007	Mount Lemmon	Mount Lemmon Survey	·	1.8 km	MPC · JPL
304899	2007 RY_{235}	—	September 12, 2007	Mount Lemmon	Mount Lemmon Survey	·	1.6 km	MPC · JPL
304900	2007 RV_{238}	—	September 14, 2007	Catalina	CSS	·	2.2 km	MPC · JPL

== 304901–305000 ==
back to top

Designation			Discovery			Properties		Ref
Permanent	Provisional	Named after	Date	Site	Discoverer(s)	Category	Diam.	Ref
304901	2007 RJ_{241}	—	September 11, 2007	Purple Mountain	PMO NEO Survey Program	NYS	1.3 km	MPC · JPL
304902	2007 RN_{245}	—	September 11, 2007	Kitt Peak	Spacewatch	·	1.7 km	MPC · JPL
304903	2007 RA_{257}	—	September 14, 2007	Catalina	CSS	·	1.5 km	MPC · JPL
304904	2007 RT_{258}	—	September 14, 2007	Mount Lemmon	Mount Lemmon Survey	·	1.1 km	MPC · JPL
304905	2007 RK_{264}	—	September 15, 2007	Mount Lemmon	Mount Lemmon Survey	·	1.1 km	MPC · JPL
304906	2007 RQ_{271}	—	September 15, 2007	Mount Lemmon	Mount Lemmon Survey	·	1.5 km	MPC · JPL
304907	2007 RY_{277}	—	September 5, 2007	Catalina	CSS	·	2.2 km	MPC · JPL
304908 Steveoda	2007 RM_{281}	Steveoda	September 13, 2007	Catalina	CSS	·	1.4 km	MPC · JPL
304909	2007 RU_{283}	—	September 3, 2007	Catalina	CSS	·	1.2 km	MPC · JPL
304910	2007 RV_{283}	—	September 5, 2007	Catalina	CSS	V	970 m	MPC · JPL
304911	2007 RX_{284}	—	September 12, 2007	Mount Lemmon	Mount Lemmon Survey	NYS	1.2 km	MPC · JPL
304912	2007 RS_{287}	—	September 10, 2007	Kitt Peak	Spacewatch	·	1.4 km	MPC · JPL
304913	2007 RK_{289}	—	September 12, 2007	Mount Lemmon	Mount Lemmon Survey	·	1.5 km	MPC · JPL
304914	2007 RD_{292}	—	September 12, 2007	Mount Lemmon	Mount Lemmon Survey	MAS	900 m	MPC · JPL
304915	2007 RV_{294}	—	September 14, 2007	Mount Lemmon	Mount Lemmon Survey	·	1.2 km	MPC · JPL
304916	2007 RA_{295}	—	September 14, 2007	Mount Lemmon	Mount Lemmon Survey	NYS	1.1 km	MPC · JPL
304917	2007 RB_{296}	—	September 15, 2007	Kitt Peak	Spacewatch	·	780 m	MPC · JPL
304918	2007 RK_{296}	—	September 14, 2007	Mount Lemmon	Mount Lemmon Survey	·	1.9 km	MPC · JPL
304919	2007 RS_{296}	—	September 14, 2007	Mount Lemmon	Mount Lemmon Survey	·	3.8 km	MPC · JPL
304920	2007 RN_{301}	—	September 13, 2007	Mount Lemmon	Mount Lemmon Survey	NYS	1.2 km	MPC · JPL
304921	2007 RY_{301}	—	September 14, 2007	Mount Lemmon	Mount Lemmon Survey	·	1.6 km	MPC · JPL
304922	2007 RQ_{302}	—	September 10, 2007	Mount Lemmon	Mount Lemmon Survey	·	2.6 km	MPC · JPL
304923	2007 RG_{310}	—	September 5, 2007	Catalina	CSS	·	1.1 km	MPC · JPL
304924	2007 RF_{312}	—	September 12, 2007	Catalina	CSS	V	760 m	MPC · JPL
304925	2007 RG_{313}	—	September 5, 2007	Catalina	CSS	V	880 m	MPC · JPL
304926	2007 RH_{313}	—	September 5, 2007	Catalina	CSS	·	1.8 km	MPC · JPL
304927	2007 RC_{316}	—	September 13, 2007	Kitt Peak	Spacewatch	·	1.4 km	MPC · JPL
304928	2007 RP_{320}	—	September 13, 2007	Mount Lemmon	Mount Lemmon Survey	·	1.0 km	MPC · JPL
304929	2007 RF_{321}	—	September 13, 2007	Anderson Mesa	LONEOS	·	1.8 km	MPC · JPL
304930	2007 RJ_{322}	—	September 12, 2007	Catalina	CSS	·	1.2 km	MPC · JPL
304931	2007 RY_{322}	—	September 14, 2007	Mount Lemmon	Mount Lemmon Survey	·	1.2 km	MPC · JPL
304932	2007 RB_{323}	—	September 14, 2007	Kitt Peak	Spacewatch	·	2.5 km	MPC · JPL
304933	2007 RK_{324}	—	September 15, 2007	Mount Lemmon	Mount Lemmon Survey	·	2.3 km	MPC · JPL
304934	2007 RZ_{325}	—	September 15, 2007	Mount Lemmon	Mount Lemmon Survey	(194)	1.7 km	MPC · JPL
304935	2007 SE_{2}	—	September 19, 2007	Dauban	Chante-Perdrix	·	1.3 km	MPC · JPL
304936	2007 SG_{2}	—	September 19, 2007	Altschwendt	W. Ries	·	1.2 km	MPC · JPL
304937	2007 SM_{11}	—	September 26, 2007	Mount Lemmon	Mount Lemmon Survey	·	2.9 km	MPC · JPL
304938	2007 SF_{16}	—	September 30, 2007	Kitt Peak	Spacewatch	·	1.2 km	MPC · JPL
304939	2007 SP_{18}	—	September 18, 2007	Mount Lemmon	Mount Lemmon Survey	·	1.1 km	MPC · JPL
304940	2007 SR_{19}	—	September 25, 2007	Mount Lemmon	Mount Lemmon Survey	MAS	710 m	MPC · JPL
304941	2007 TC_{4}	—	October 6, 2007	Pla D'Arguines	R. Ferrando	·	1.5 km	MPC · JPL
304942	2007 TK_{4}	—	October 6, 2007	7300	W. K. Y. Yeung	HNS	1.3 km	MPC · JPL
304943	2007 TO_{4}	—	October 6, 2007	7300	W. K. Y. Yeung	V	880 m	MPC · JPL
304944	2007 TK_{6}	—	September 3, 2007	Catalina	CSS	V	850 m	MPC · JPL
304945	2007 TF_{8}	—	October 7, 2007	Catalina	CSS	·	8.0 km	MPC · JPL
304946	2007 TS_{9}	—	October 6, 2007	Socorro	LINEAR	MAS	810 m	MPC · JPL
304947	2007 TZ_{9}	—	October 6, 2007	Socorro	LINEAR	·	1.9 km	MPC · JPL
304948	2007 TT_{16}	—	October 4, 2007	Catalina	CSS	·	1.4 km	MPC · JPL
304949	2007 TD_{17}	—	October 7, 2007	Cordell-Lorenz	Cordell-Lorenz	·	1.2 km	MPC · JPL
304950	2007 TA_{31}	—	October 4, 2007	Kitt Peak	Spacewatch	·	1.9 km	MPC · JPL
304951	2007 TG_{37}	—	October 4, 2007	Catalina	CSS	·	1.3 km	MPC · JPL
304952	2007 TY_{40}	—	October 6, 2007	Kitt Peak	Spacewatch	·	1.3 km	MPC · JPL
304953	2007 TG_{41}	—	October 6, 2007	Kitt Peak	Spacewatch	MAR	1.3 km	MPC · JPL
304954	2007 TP_{49}	—	October 4, 2007	Kitt Peak	Spacewatch	·	1.2 km	MPC · JPL
304955	2007 TM_{51}	—	October 4, 2007	Kitt Peak	Spacewatch	·	1.3 km	MPC · JPL
304956	2007 TW_{51}	—	March 13, 2005	Kitt Peak	Spacewatch	·	1.5 km	MPC · JPL
304957	2007 TM_{52}	—	October 4, 2007	Kitt Peak	Spacewatch	·	1.3 km	MPC · JPL
304958	2007 TT_{63}	—	October 7, 2007	Mount Lemmon	Mount Lemmon Survey	(5)	1.1 km	MPC · JPL
304959	2007 TX_{66}	—	October 12, 2007	7300	W. K. Y. Yeung	·	2.1 km	MPC · JPL
304960	2007 TT_{77}	—	October 5, 2007	Kitt Peak	Spacewatch	·	1.6 km	MPC · JPL
304961	2007 TV_{83}	—	October 8, 2007	Mount Lemmon	Mount Lemmon Survey	·	1.1 km	MPC · JPL
304962	2007 TR_{93}	—	October 6, 2007	Kitt Peak	Spacewatch	·	1.3 km	MPC · JPL
304963	2007 TE_{94}	—	October 7, 2007	Catalina	CSS	·	1.5 km	MPC · JPL
304964	2007 TR_{99}	—	October 8, 2007	Mount Lemmon	Mount Lemmon Survey	NYS	1.4 km	MPC · JPL
304965	2007 TL_{125}	—	October 6, 2007	Kitt Peak	Spacewatch	·	1.5 km	MPC · JPL
304966	2007 TM_{126}	—	October 6, 2007	Kitt Peak	Spacewatch	·	1.5 km	MPC · JPL
304967	2007 TC_{130}	—	October 6, 2007	Kitt Peak	Spacewatch	HNS	1.5 km	MPC · JPL
304968	2007 TE_{132}	—	October 7, 2007	Mount Lemmon	Mount Lemmon Survey	·	1.4 km	MPC · JPL
304969	2007 TN_{132}	—	October 7, 2007	Mount Lemmon	Mount Lemmon Survey	·	1.6 km	MPC · JPL
304970	2007 TG_{151}	—	October 9, 2007	Socorro	LINEAR	·	1.4 km	MPC · JPL
304971	2007 TT_{151}	—	October 9, 2007	Socorro	LINEAR	·	1.5 km	MPC · JPL
304972	2007 TF_{153}	—	October 9, 2007	Socorro	LINEAR	·	1.8 km	MPC · JPL
304973	2007 TL_{160}	—	October 9, 2007	Socorro	LINEAR	·	2.0 km	MPC · JPL
304974	2007 TG_{161}	—	October 11, 2007	Socorro	LINEAR	·	1.6 km	MPC · JPL
304975	2007 TR_{162}	—	October 11, 2007	Socorro	LINEAR	·	1.8 km	MPC · JPL
304976	2007 TF_{171}	—	October 12, 2007	Dauban	Chante-Perdrix	·	1.5 km	MPC · JPL
304977	2007 TA_{177}	—	October 6, 2007	Kitt Peak	Spacewatch	·	1.9 km	MPC · JPL
304978	2007 TE_{179}	—	October 7, 2007	Catalina	CSS	·	1.9 km	MPC · JPL
304979	2007 TQ_{186}	—	October 13, 2007	Socorro	LINEAR	·	1.6 km	MPC · JPL
304980	2007 TS_{203}	—	October 8, 2007	Mount Lemmon	Mount Lemmon Survey	·	1.8 km	MPC · JPL
304981	2007 TR_{214}	—	October 7, 2007	Catalina	CSS	·	1.1 km	MPC · JPL
304982	2007 TF_{215}	—	October 7, 2007	Kitt Peak	Spacewatch	·	1.2 km	MPC · JPL
304983	2007 TH_{216}	—	October 7, 2007	Kitt Peak	Spacewatch	NYS	1.6 km	MPC · JPL
304984	2007 TZ_{216}	—	October 7, 2007	Kitt Peak	Spacewatch	·	1.8 km	MPC · JPL
304985	2007 TZ_{217}	—	October 7, 2007	Kitt Peak	Spacewatch	(5)	1.2 km	MPC · JPL
304986	2007 TP_{218}	—	October 7, 2007	Kitt Peak	Spacewatch	·	1.8 km	MPC · JPL
304987	2007 TT_{227}	—	October 8, 2007	Kitt Peak	Spacewatch	·	1.4 km	MPC · JPL
304988	2007 TB_{228}	—	October 8, 2007	Kitt Peak	Spacewatch	·	1.6 km	MPC · JPL
304989	2007 TU_{230}	—	October 8, 2007	Kitt Peak	Spacewatch	·	1.1 km	MPC · JPL
304990	2007 TZ_{231}	—	October 8, 2007	Kitt Peak	Spacewatch	·	1.1 km	MPC · JPL
304991	2007 TN_{239}	—	October 10, 2007	Kitt Peak	Spacewatch	HNS	1.2 km	MPC · JPL
304992	2007 TV_{240}	—	October 6, 2007	Kitt Peak	Spacewatch	·	1.3 km	MPC · JPL
304993	2007 TV_{244}	—	October 8, 2007	Catalina	CSS	EUN	1.2 km	MPC · JPL
304994	2007 TR_{248}	—	October 11, 2007	Kitt Peak	Spacewatch	·	1.6 km	MPC · JPL
304995	2007 TS_{248}	—	October 11, 2007	Catalina	CSS	·	1.4 km	MPC · JPL
304996	2007 TG_{254}	—	October 8, 2007	Mount Lemmon	Mount Lemmon Survey	·	2.4 km	MPC · JPL
304997	2007 TL_{258}	—	October 10, 2007	Mount Lemmon	Mount Lemmon Survey	·	2.0 km	MPC · JPL
304998	2007 TS_{261}	—	October 10, 2007	Kitt Peak	Spacewatch	·	1.6 km	MPC · JPL
304999	2007 TY_{262}	—	October 10, 2007	Kitt Peak	Spacewatch	·	1.7 km	MPC · JPL
305000	2007 TJ_{263}	—	October 10, 2007	Kitt Peak	Spacewatch	·	2.1 km	MPC · JPL

back to top

== See also ==
- Meanings of minor-planet names: 304001–305000
