= Meanings of minor-planet names: 304001–305000 =

As minor planet discoveries are confirmed, they are given a permanent number by the IAU's Minor Planet Center (MPC), and the discoverers can then submit names for them, following the IAU's naming conventions. The list below concerns those minor planets in the specified number-range that have received names, and explains the meanings of those names.

Official naming citations of newly named small Solar System bodies are approved and published in a bulletin by IAU's Working Group for Small Bodies Nomenclature (WGSBN). Before May 2021, citations were published in MPC's Minor Planet Circulars for many decades. Recent citations can also be found on the JPL Small-Body Database (SBDB). Until his death in 2016, German astronomer Lutz D. Schmadel compiled these citations into the Dictionary of Minor Planet Names (DMP) and regularly updated the collection.

Based on Paul Herget's The Names of the Minor Planets, Schmadel also researched the unclear origin of numerous asteroids, most of which had been named prior to World War II. This article incorporates text from this source, which is in the public domain: SBDB New namings may only be added to this list below after official publication as the preannouncement of names is condemned. The WGSBN publishes a comprehensive guideline for the naming rules of non-cometary small Solar System bodies.

== 304001–304100 ==
Named minor planet	Provisional	This minor planet was named for...	Ref · Catalog
There are no named minor planets in this number range

== 304101–304200 ==
back to top

Named minor planet	Provisional	This minor planet was named for...	Ref · Catalog
304122 Ameliawehlau	2006 JY_{73}	Amelia Fay Wehlau (1930–2021), an American-Canadian astronomer.	IAU · 304122

== 304201–304300 ==
back to top

Named minor planet	Provisional	This minor planet was named for...	Ref · Catalog
304233 Majaess	2006 RE_{3}	Daniel Majaess (born 1984) is a young Canadian observational astronomer who researches the Cepheid distance scale, variable stars, and the Milky Way's spiral structure and its many star clusters.	JPL · 304233
304273 Seancarey	2006 RT_{117}	Sean J. Carey (b. 1966), American astronomer at Caltech/IPAC specializing in the acquisition, calibration, and interpretation of infrared telescope data.	IAU · 304273

== 304301–304400 ==
back to top

Named minor planet	Provisional	This minor planet was named for...	Ref · Catalog
304368 Móricz	2006 SX_{363}	Zsigmond Móricz (1879–1942), a Hungarian novelist, journalist and one of the most prominent figures of Social Realism in the 20th century.	JPL · 304368

== 304401–304500 ==
back to top

Named minor planet	Provisional	This minor planet was named for...	Ref · Catalog
There are no named minor planets in this number range

== 304501–304600 ==
back to top

Named minor planet	Provisional	This minor planet was named for...	Ref · Catalog
304557 Welling	2006 UL_{352}	Beatrice Winifred Welling (1888–1968), Canadian librarian specialising in government publications.	JPL · 304557

== 304601–304700 ==
back to top

Named minor planet	Provisional	This minor planet was named for...	Ref · Catalog
There are no named minor planets in this number range

== 304701–304800 ==
back to top

Named minor planet	Provisional	This minor planet was named for...	Ref · Catalog
304788 Cresques	2007 NZ_{1}	Cresques Abraham (1325–1387), a Majorcan Jewish geographer and cartographer. His Catalan Atlas (1375), stored in the Bibliothèque nationale de Paris, is considered one of the pinnacles of medieval cartographic knowledge.	JPL · 304788

== 304801–304900 ==
back to top

Named minor planet	Provisional	This minor planet was named for...	Ref · Catalog
304813 Cesarina	2007 QA	Cesarina Papini (born 1964), wife of Italian co-discoverer Michele Mazzucato	JPL · 304813
304826 Kini	2007 RM_{19}	Kini R. Manjunatha (b. 1956), a biologist at the National University of Singapore.	IAU · 304826

== 304901–305000 ==
back to top

Named minor planet	Provisional	This minor planet was named for...	Ref · Catalog
304908 Steveoda	2007 RM_{281}	Steve Oda (born 1946) is a Japanese-Canadian sarod player, composer, and teacher of classical Hindustani music. His virtuosity on the sarod and his kind spirit have enchanted people across the world, and his generosity in teaching has inspired many students to carry on the rich legacy of Classical Indian music.	JPL · 304908

back to top

Preceded by 303,001–304,000	Meanings of minor-planet names List of minor planets: 304,001–305,000	Succeeded by 305,001–306,000
