= List of minor planets: 303001–304000 =

The following is a partial list of minor planets, running from minor-planet number 303001 through 304000, inclusive. The primary data for this and other partial lists is based on JPL's "Small-Body Orbital Elements" and data available from the Minor Planet Center. Critical list information is also provided by the MPC, unless otherwise specified from Lowell Observatory. A detailed description of the table's columns and additional sources are given on the main page including a complete list of every page in this series, and a statistical break-up on the dynamical classification of minor planets.

Also see the summary list of all named bodies in numerical and alphabetical order, and the corresponding naming citations for the number range of this particular list. New namings may only be added to this list after official publication, as the preannouncement of names is condemned by the Working Group for Small Bodies Nomenclature of the International Astronomical Union.

Near-Earth obj.	MBA (inner)	MBA (outer)	Centaur
Mars-crosser	MBA (middle)	Jupiter trojan	Trans-Neptunian obj.
Unclassified

== 303001–303100 ==
Designation			Discovery			Properties		Ref
Permanent	Provisional	Named after	Date	Site	Discoverer(s)	Category	Diam.	Ref
303001	2003 WQ_{61}	—	November 19, 2003	Kitt Peak	Spacewatch	·	1.3 km	MPC · JPL
303002	2003 WE_{65}	—	November 19, 2003	Kitt Peak	Spacewatch	·	1.6 km	MPC · JPL
303003	2003 WQ_{70}	—	November 20, 2003	Socorro	LINEAR	·	1.2 km	MPC · JPL
303004	2003 WG_{72}	—	November 20, 2003	Socorro	LINEAR	·	1.8 km	MPC · JPL
303005	2003 WO_{81}	—	November 20, 2003	Socorro	LINEAR	·	2.6 km	MPC · JPL
303006	2003 WZ_{88}	—	November 16, 2003	Catalina	CSS	NYS	1.9 km	MPC · JPL
303007	2003 WT_{91}	—	November 18, 2003	Palomar	NEAT	·	1.2 km	MPC · JPL
303008	2003 WV_{102}	—	November 21, 2003	Socorro	LINEAR	MAR	1.5 km	MPC · JPL
303009	2003 WF_{105}	—	November 21, 2003	Socorro	LINEAR	(5)	1.7 km	MPC · JPL
303010	2003 WJ_{115}	—	November 20, 2003	Socorro	LINEAR	·	1.3 km	MPC · JPL
303011	2003 WR_{119}	—	November 20, 2003	Socorro	LINEAR	·	2.2 km	MPC · JPL
303012	2003 WZ_{121}	—	November 20, 2003	Socorro	LINEAR	·	2.1 km	MPC · JPL
303013	2003 WC_{125}	—	November 20, 2003	Socorro	LINEAR	·	1.8 km	MPC · JPL
303014	2003 WH_{126}	—	November 20, 2003	Socorro	LINEAR	·	1.8 km	MPC · JPL
303015	2003 WC_{127}	—	November 20, 2003	Socorro	LINEAR	EUN	2.3 km	MPC · JPL
303016	2003 WM_{132}	—	November 19, 2003	Kitt Peak	Spacewatch	·	1.8 km	MPC · JPL
303017	2003 WS_{147}	—	November 23, 2003	Kitt Peak	Spacewatch	·	1.5 km	MPC · JPL
303018	2003 WB_{151}	—	November 24, 2003	Anderson Mesa	LONEOS	·	1.9 km	MPC · JPL
303019	2003 WH_{156}	—	November 29, 2003	Socorro	LINEAR	EUN	1.4 km	MPC · JPL
303020	2003 WH_{175}	—	November 19, 2003	Kitt Peak	Spacewatch	·	1.2 km	MPC · JPL
303021	2003 WK_{178}	—	November 20, 2003	Kitt Peak	M. W. Buie	·	1 km	MPC · JPL
303022	2003 WD_{192}	—	November 19, 2003	Anderson Mesa	LONEOS	·	1.1 km	MPC · JPL
303023	2003 XC	—	December 1, 2003	Nogales	Tenagra II	·	4.0 km	MPC · JPL
303024	2003 XV_{2}	—	December 1, 2003	Socorro	LINEAR	·	1.3 km	MPC · JPL
303025	2003 XB_{3}	—	December 1, 2003	Socorro	LINEAR	·	1.4 km	MPC · JPL
303026	2003 XO_{3}	—	December 1, 2003	Socorro	LINEAR	·	2.6 km	MPC · JPL
303027	2003 XL_{19}	—	December 15, 2003	Socorro	LINEAR	·	1.9 km	MPC · JPL
303028	2003 YR_{6}	—	December 17, 2003	Anderson Mesa	LONEOS	·	1.8 km	MPC · JPL
303029	2003 YV_{9}	—	December 17, 2003	Kitt Peak	Spacewatch	(5)	1.4 km	MPC · JPL
303030	2003 YV_{11}	—	December 17, 2003	Socorro	LINEAR	·	2.2 km	MPC · JPL
303031	2003 YF_{13}	—	December 17, 2003	Anderson Mesa	LONEOS	·	2.0 km	MPC · JPL
303032	2003 YK_{19}	—	December 17, 2003	Kitt Peak	Spacewatch	·	1.5 km	MPC · JPL
303033	2003 YX_{20}	—	December 17, 2003	Kitt Peak	Spacewatch	·	1.8 km	MPC · JPL
303034	2003 YY_{22}	—	December 16, 2003	Catalina	CSS	(5)	1.3 km	MPC · JPL
303035	2003 YS_{30}	—	December 18, 2003	Socorro	LINEAR	·	1.8 km	MPC · JPL
303036	2003 YR_{31}	—	December 18, 2003	Socorro	LINEAR	·	1.2 km	MPC · JPL
303037	2003 YH_{35}	—	December 19, 2003	Kitt Peak	Spacewatch	(5)	1.5 km	MPC · JPL
303038	2003 YD_{36}	—	December 19, 2003	Haleakala	NEAT	·	2.0 km	MPC · JPL
303039	2003 YR_{38}	—	December 19, 2003	Kitt Peak	Spacewatch	·	1.3 km	MPC · JPL
303040	2003 YA_{46}	—	December 17, 2003	Socorro	LINEAR	·	1.9 km	MPC · JPL
303041	2003 YU_{56}	—	December 19, 2003	Socorro	LINEAR	(5)	1.3 km	MPC · JPL
303042	2003 YQ_{59}	—	December 19, 2003	Kitt Peak	Spacewatch	·	1.5 km	MPC · JPL
303043	2003 YG_{62}	—	December 19, 2003	Socorro	LINEAR	RAF	1.4 km	MPC · JPL
303044	2003 YK_{62}	—	December 19, 2003	Socorro	LINEAR	·	1.8 km	MPC · JPL
303045	2003 YL_{72}	—	December 18, 2003	Socorro	LINEAR	·	1.8 km	MPC · JPL
303046	2003 YN_{77}	—	December 18, 2003	Socorro	LINEAR	·	2.3 km	MPC · JPL
303047	2003 YV_{80}	—	December 18, 2003	Socorro	LINEAR	·	2.2 km	MPC · JPL
303048	2003 YA_{90}	—	December 19, 2003	Kitt Peak	Spacewatch	·	1.6 km	MPC · JPL
303049	2003 YM_{93}	—	December 21, 2003	Needville	Needville	·	3.2 km	MPC · JPL
303050	2003 YH_{102}	—	December 19, 2003	Socorro	LINEAR	·	2.4 km	MPC · JPL
303051	2003 YF_{103}	—	December 19, 2003	Catalina	CSS	JUN	1.9 km	MPC · JPL
303052	2003 YC_{106}	—	December 22, 2003	Socorro	LINEAR	·	2.0 km	MPC · JPL
303053	2003 YZ_{107}	—	December 25, 2003	Piszkéstető	K. Sárneczky	ADE	2.1 km	MPC · JPL
303054	2003 YM_{110}	—	December 23, 2003	Socorro	LINEAR	JUN	1.2 km	MPC · JPL
303055	2003 YN_{111}	—	December 23, 2003	Socorro	LINEAR	HNS	1.8 km	MPC · JPL
303056	2003 YB_{116}	—	December 27, 2003	Socorro	LINEAR	(5)	1.4 km	MPC · JPL
303057	2003 YP_{116}	—	December 27, 2003	Socorro	LINEAR	·	2.4 km	MPC · JPL
303058	2003 YF_{126}	—	December 27, 2003	Socorro	LINEAR	·	2.1 km	MPC · JPL
303059	2003 YH_{130}	—	December 27, 2003	Socorro	LINEAR	·	4.1 km	MPC · JPL
303060	2003 YK_{131}	—	December 28, 2003	Socorro	LINEAR	·	1.3 km	MPC · JPL
303061	2003 YL_{134}	—	December 28, 2003	Socorro	LINEAR	·	2.1 km	MPC · JPL
303062	2003 YE_{135}	—	December 28, 2003	Socorro	LINEAR	·	1.8 km	MPC · JPL
303063	2003 YL_{141}	—	December 28, 2003	Socorro	LINEAR	·	2.1 km	MPC · JPL
303064	2003 YW_{144}	—	December 28, 2003	Socorro	LINEAR	EUN	1.4 km	MPC · JPL
303065	2003 YR_{145}	—	December 28, 2003	Socorro	LINEAR	EUN	1.6 km	MPC · JPL
303066	2003 YB_{151}	—	December 29, 2003	Catalina	CSS	·	2.5 km	MPC · JPL
303067	2003 YD_{151}	—	December 29, 2003	Catalina	CSS	EUN	1.9 km	MPC · JPL
303068	2003 YM_{151}	—	December 29, 2003	Catalina	CSS	EUN	1.6 km	MPC · JPL
303069	2003 YU_{152}	—	December 29, 2003	Catalina	CSS	·	2.5 km	MPC · JPL
303070	2003 YE_{154}	—	December 29, 2003	Socorro	LINEAR	·	2.1 km	MPC · JPL
303071	2003 YR_{154}	—	December 29, 2003	Socorro	LINEAR	·	2.3 km	MPC · JPL
303072	2003 YZ_{154}	—	December 30, 2003	Socorro	LINEAR	·	3.0 km	MPC · JPL
303073	2003 YB_{155}	—	December 30, 2003	Socorro	LINEAR	·	2.2 km	MPC · JPL
303074	2003 YP_{158}	—	December 17, 2003	Socorro	LINEAR	·	1.9 km	MPC · JPL
303075	2003 YY_{167}	—	December 18, 2003	Socorro	LINEAR	·	1.8 km	MPC · JPL
303076	2003 YE_{175}	—	December 19, 2003	Kitt Peak	Spacewatch	·	1.5 km	MPC · JPL
303077	2003 YK_{175}	—	December 19, 2003	Kitt Peak	Spacewatch	·	2.6 km	MPC · JPL
303078	2003 YY_{175}	—	December 22, 2003	Palomar	NEAT	·	2.6 km	MPC · JPL
303079	2004 AB	—	January 3, 2004	Socorro	LINEAR	·	2.8 km	MPC · JPL
303080	2004 AU_{1}	—	January 12, 2004	Palomar	NEAT	·	2.2 km	MPC · JPL
303081	2004 AC_{3}	—	January 11, 2004	Palomar	NEAT	·	3.0 km	MPC · JPL
303082	2004 AY_{7}	—	January 13, 2004	Anderson Mesa	LONEOS	·	1.4 km	MPC · JPL
303083	2004 AT_{16}	—	December 19, 2003	Kitt Peak	Spacewatch	·	2.1 km	MPC · JPL
303084	2004 AU_{21}	—	January 15, 2004	Kitt Peak	Spacewatch	·	2.2 km	MPC · JPL
303085	2004 BN_{1}	—	January 16, 2004	Kitt Peak	Spacewatch	·	1.4 km	MPC · JPL
303086	2004 BZ_{8}	—	January 17, 2004	Palomar	NEAT	·	3.1 km	MPC · JPL
303087	2004 BG_{9}	—	January 17, 2004	Palomar	NEAT	·	2.2 km	MPC · JPL
303088	2004 BH_{12}	—	January 16, 2004	Palomar	NEAT	·	1.6 km	MPC · JPL
303089	2004 BL_{15}	—	January 16, 2004	Kitt Peak	Spacewatch	·	2.6 km	MPC · JPL
303090	2004 BE_{17}	—	January 17, 2004	Palomar	NEAT	·	2.2 km	MPC · JPL
303091	2004 BQ_{23}	—	January 18, 2004	Kitt Peak	Spacewatch	·	2.7 km	MPC · JPL
303092	2004 BU_{23}	—	January 19, 2004	Sandlot	Sandlot	·	1.5 km	MPC · JPL
303093	2004 BO_{32}	—	January 19, 2004	Kitt Peak	Spacewatch	·	2.3 km	MPC · JPL
303094	2004 BU_{34}	—	January 19, 2004	Kitt Peak	Spacewatch	·	2.1 km	MPC · JPL
303095	2004 BN_{43}	—	January 22, 2004	Socorro	LINEAR	·	3.1 km	MPC · JPL
303096	2004 BB_{54}	—	January 22, 2004	Socorro	LINEAR	WIT	1.2 km	MPC · JPL
303097	2004 BL_{58}	—	January 23, 2004	Socorro	LINEAR	·	2.4 km	MPC · JPL
303098	2004 BJ_{60}	—	January 21, 2004	Socorro	LINEAR	·	2.4 km	MPC · JPL
303099	2004 BV_{75}	—	January 23, 2004	Socorro	LINEAR	JUN	1.4 km	MPC · JPL
303100	2004 BK_{84}	—	January 25, 2004	Haleakala	NEAT	JUN	1.4 km	MPC · JPL

== 303101–303200 ==
back to top

Designation			Discovery			Properties		Ref
Permanent	Provisional	Named after	Date	Site	Discoverer(s)	Category	Diam.	Ref
303101	2004 BW_{92}	—	January 27, 2004	Anderson Mesa	LONEOS	·	3.3 km	MPC · JPL
303102	2004 BJ_{96}	—	January 24, 2004	Socorro	LINEAR	·	1.4 km	MPC · JPL
303103	2004 BR_{107}	—	January 28, 2004	Catalina	CSS	·	2.8 km	MPC · JPL
303104	2004 BZ_{107}	—	January 28, 2004	Catalina	CSS	·	2.1 km	MPC · JPL
303105	2004 BK_{117}	—	January 28, 2004	Catalina	CSS	·	2.4 km	MPC · JPL
303106	2004 BR_{120}	—	January 31, 2004	Socorro	LINEAR	·	2.2 km	MPC · JPL
303107	2004 BD_{121}	—	January 31, 2004	Socorro	LINEAR	·	2.2 km	MPC · JPL
303108	2004 BQ_{137}	—	January 19, 2004	Kitt Peak	Spacewatch	·	1.3 km	MPC · JPL
303109	2004 BR_{143}	—	January 19, 2004	Kitt Peak	Spacewatch	·	1.6 km	MPC · JPL
303110	2004 BE_{144}	—	January 19, 2004	Kitt Peak	Spacewatch	·	1.6 km	MPC · JPL
303111	2004 BF_{151}	—	January 18, 2004	Palomar	NEAT	EUN	1.7 km	MPC · JPL
303112	2004 BA_{153}	—	January 27, 2004	Kitt Peak	Spacewatch	·	1.6 km	MPC · JPL
303113	2004 BD_{162}	—	January 16, 2004	Palomar	NEAT	·	2.4 km	MPC · JPL
303114	2004 CA_{1}	—	February 9, 2004	Palomar	NEAT	·	1.9 km	MPC · JPL
303115	2004 CB_{2}	—	February 12, 2004	Goodricke-Pigott	Goodricke-Pigott	·	2.8 km	MPC · JPL
303116	2004 CE_{5}	—	February 10, 2004	Palomar	NEAT	·	2.5 km	MPC · JPL
303117	2004 CK_{16}	—	February 11, 2004	Kitt Peak	Spacewatch	·	1.6 km	MPC · JPL
303118	2004 CF_{20}	—	February 11, 2004	Kitt Peak	Spacewatch	·	1.7 km	MPC · JPL
303119	2004 CE_{30}	—	February 12, 2004	Kitt Peak	Spacewatch	·	2.0 km	MPC · JPL
303120	2004 CN_{40}	—	February 12, 2004	Kitt Peak	Spacewatch	·	2.0 km	MPC · JPL
303121	2004 CQ_{43}	—	February 12, 2004	Kitt Peak	Spacewatch	·	2.3 km	MPC · JPL
303122	2004 CF_{45}	—	February 13, 2004	Kitt Peak	Spacewatch	·	2.1 km	MPC · JPL
303123	2004 CC_{56}	—	February 14, 2004	Nogales	Tenagra II	HOF	2.8 km	MPC · JPL
303124	2004 CT_{58}	—	February 10, 2004	Palomar	NEAT	(5)	1.7 km	MPC · JPL
303125	2004 CR_{62}	—	February 11, 2004	Palomar	NEAT	·	3.3 km	MPC · JPL
303126	2004 CP_{71}	—	February 13, 2004	Palomar	NEAT	·	2.1 km	MPC · JPL
303127	2004 CL_{76}	—	February 11, 2004	Palomar	NEAT	EUN	1.4 km	MPC · JPL
303128	2004 CH_{83}	—	February 12, 2004	Kitt Peak	Spacewatch	·	2.0 km	MPC · JPL
303129	2004 CF_{89}	—	February 11, 2004	Kitt Peak	Spacewatch	·	1.6 km	MPC · JPL
303130	2004 CS_{91}	—	February 13, 2004	Palomar	NEAT	·	2.3 km	MPC · JPL
303131	2004 CF_{92}	—	February 14, 2004	Palomar	NEAT	·	1.7 km	MPC · JPL
303132	2004 CU_{92}	—	February 14, 2004	Haleakala	NEAT	·	2.1 km	MPC · JPL
303133	2004 CG_{102}	—	February 12, 2004	Palomar	NEAT	·	2.5 km	MPC · JPL
303134	2004 CU_{107}	—	February 14, 2004	Kitt Peak	Spacewatch	·	1.8 km	MPC · JPL
303135	2004 CJ_{111}	—	February 14, 2004	Kitt Peak	Spacewatch	·	1.8 km	MPC · JPL
303136	2004 CV_{112}	—	February 13, 2004	Anderson Mesa	LONEOS	EUN	1.7 km	MPC · JPL
303137	2004 CW_{112}	—	February 13, 2004	Anderson Mesa	LONEOS	·	2.3 km	MPC · JPL
303138	2004 CX_{130}	—	February 12, 2004	Palomar	NEAT	·	2.3 km	MPC · JPL
303139	2004 DM_{10}	—	February 18, 2004	Desert Eagle	W. K. Y. Yeung	·	2.5 km	MPC · JPL
303140	2004 DA_{15}	—	February 17, 2004	Palomar	NEAT	·	2.4 km	MPC · JPL
303141	2004 DU_{23}	—	February 19, 2004	Socorro	LINEAR	·	1.9 km	MPC · JPL
303142	2004 DU_{24}	—	February 19, 2004	Socorro	LINEAR	·	2.3 km	MPC · JPL
303143	2004 DE_{41}	—	February 18, 2004	Haleakala	NEAT	·	3.0 km	MPC · JPL
303144	2004 DN_{41}	—	February 18, 2004	Haleakala	NEAT	·	3.5 km	MPC · JPL
303145	2004 DB_{46}	—	February 19, 2004	Socorro	LINEAR	·	1.6 km	MPC · JPL
303146	2004 DH_{52}	—	February 25, 2004	Socorro	LINEAR	AEO	1.7 km	MPC · JPL
303147	2004 DD_{57}	—	February 22, 2004	Kitt Peak	Spacewatch	AGN	1.2 km	MPC · JPL
303148	2004 DD_{69}	—	February 26, 2004	Kitt Peak	M. W. Buie	GEF	1.8 km	MPC · JPL
303149	2004 DY_{70}	—	February 26, 2004	Kitt Peak	M. W. Buie	·	2.1 km	MPC · JPL
303150	2004 DB_{77}	—	February 18, 2004	Kitt Peak	Spacewatch	·	2.0 km	MPC · JPL
303151	2004 EL_{2}	—	March 13, 2004	Palomar	NEAT	GEF	1.6 km	MPC · JPL
303152	2004 EQ_{5}	—	March 11, 2004	Palomar	NEAT	BRA	2.0 km	MPC · JPL
303153	2004 EA_{20}	—	March 14, 2004	Kitt Peak	Spacewatch	·	2.6 km	MPC · JPL
303154	2004 EG_{24}	—	March 15, 2004	Črni Vrh	Matičič, S.	·	2.3 km	MPC · JPL
303155	2004 EX_{29}	—	March 15, 2004	Kitt Peak	Spacewatch	·	1.9 km	MPC · JPL
303156	2004 EE_{34}	—	March 12, 2004	Palomar	NEAT	·	2.6 km	MPC · JPL
303157	2004 EA_{44}	—	March 13, 2004	Palomar	NEAT	·	2.1 km	MPC · JPL
303158	2004 EJ_{45}	—	March 15, 2004	Kitt Peak	Spacewatch	·	2.7 km	MPC · JPL
303159	2004 EX_{56}	—	March 15, 2004	Palomar	NEAT	·	4.5 km	MPC · JPL
303160	2004 ET_{57}	—	March 15, 2004	Palomar	NEAT	·	2.5 km	MPC · JPL
303161	2004 EG_{60}	—	March 15, 2004	Palomar	NEAT	·	2.4 km	MPC · JPL
303162	2004 EM_{61}	—	March 12, 2004	Palomar	NEAT	MRX	1.1 km	MPC · JPL
303163	2004 EL_{68}	—	March 15, 2004	Socorro	LINEAR	·	2.1 km	MPC · JPL
303164	2004 EK_{76}	—	March 15, 2004	Kitt Peak	Spacewatch	·	2.1 km	MPC · JPL
303165	2004 EU_{78}	—	March 15, 2004	Kitt Peak	Spacewatch	·	2.6 km	MPC · JPL
303166	2004 EN_{79}	—	March 15, 2004	Catalina	CSS	·	2.7 km	MPC · JPL
303167	2004 EE_{86}	—	March 15, 2004	Socorro	LINEAR	·	2.7 km	MPC · JPL
303168	2004 EO_{86}	—	March 15, 2004	Kitt Peak	Spacewatch	·	1.9 km	MPC · JPL
303169	2004 EL_{87}	—	March 14, 2004	Kitt Peak	Spacewatch	·	2.2 km	MPC · JPL
303170	2004 EY_{90}	—	March 15, 2004	Kitt Peak	Spacewatch	·	2.9 km	MPC · JPL
303171	2004 EX_{103}	—	March 15, 2004	Socorro	LINEAR	·	2.5 km	MPC · JPL
303172	2004 EW_{108}	—	March 15, 2004	Kitt Peak	Spacewatch	·	2.0 km	MPC · JPL
303173	2004 FD_{9}	—	March 16, 2004	Socorro	LINEAR	·	2.6 km	MPC · JPL
303174	2004 FH_{11}	—	March 23, 2004	Socorro	LINEAR	AMO +1km	1.5 km	MPC · JPL
303175	2004 FA_{25}	—	March 17, 2004	Kitt Peak	Spacewatch	AGN	1.4 km	MPC · JPL
303176	2004 FJ_{26}	—	March 17, 2004	Kitt Peak	Spacewatch	·	2.6 km	MPC · JPL
303177	2004 FW_{31}	—	March 29, 2004	Kleť	Kleť	615	1.9 km	MPC · JPL
303178	2004 FY_{34}	—	March 16, 2004	Kitt Peak	Spacewatch	PAD	2.5 km	MPC · JPL
303179	2004 FJ_{37}	—	March 17, 2004	Kitt Peak	Spacewatch	KOR	1.9 km	MPC · JPL
303180	2004 FU_{53}	—	March 17, 2004	Kitt Peak	Spacewatch	WIT	1.1 km	MPC · JPL
303181	2004 FN_{63}	—	March 19, 2004	Socorro	LINEAR	·	2.5 km	MPC · JPL
303182	2004 FB_{75}	—	March 17, 2004	Kitt Peak	Spacewatch	AGN	1.2 km	MPC · JPL
303183	2004 FZ_{75}	—	March 17, 2004	Kitt Peak	Spacewatch	·	2.3 km	MPC · JPL
303184	2004 FS_{83}	—	March 18, 2004	Palomar	NEAT	·	2.4 km	MPC · JPL
303185	2004 FQ_{90}	—	March 20, 2004	Siding Spring	SSS	GAL	2.6 km	MPC · JPL
303186	2004 FG_{95}	—	March 19, 2004	Palomar	NEAT	·	2.3 km	MPC · JPL
303187	2004 FQ_{103}	—	March 23, 2004	Socorro	LINEAR	·	2.4 km	MPC · JPL
303188	2004 FL_{115}	—	March 23, 2004	Socorro	LINEAR	·	1.3 km	MPC · JPL
303189	2004 FB_{120}	—	March 23, 2004	Kitt Peak	Spacewatch	·	2.0 km	MPC · JPL
303190	2004 FS_{120}	—	March 23, 2004	Socorro	LINEAR	·	3.0 km	MPC · JPL
303191	2004 FJ_{136}	—	March 27, 2004	Kitt Peak	Spacewatch	TIR	4.8 km	MPC · JPL
303192	2004 FE_{146}	—	March 31, 2004	Kitt Peak	Spacewatch	·	1.9 km	MPC · JPL
303193	2004 FO_{148}	—	March 29, 2004	Socorro	LINEAR	·	4.6 km	MPC · JPL
303194	2004 FF_{150}	—	March 16, 2004	Catalina	CSS	·	2.7 km	MPC · JPL
303195	2004 GB_{15}	—	April 12, 2004	Reedy Creek	J. Broughton	·	2.8 km	MPC · JPL
303196	2004 GN_{18}	—	April 13, 2004	Catalina	CSS	·	3.4 km	MPC · JPL
303197	2004 GB_{29}	—	April 11, 2004	Palomar	NEAT	·	3.3 km	MPC · JPL
303198	2004 GJ_{41}	—	April 12, 2004	Siding Spring	SSS	·	4.4 km	MPC · JPL
303199	2004 GH_{43}	—	April 12, 2004	Kitt Peak	Spacewatch	·	2.1 km	MPC · JPL
303200	2004 GK_{47}	—	April 12, 2004	Kitt Peak	Spacewatch	·	2.5 km	MPC · JPL

== 303201–303300 ==
back to top

Designation			Discovery			Properties		Ref
Permanent	Provisional	Named after	Date	Site	Discoverer(s)	Category	Diam.	Ref
303201	2004 GV_{50}	—	April 13, 2004	Kitt Peak	Spacewatch	·	2.4 km	MPC · JPL
303202	2004 GH_{51}	—	April 13, 2004	Kitt Peak	Spacewatch	·	2.2 km	MPC · JPL
303203	2004 GH_{67}	—	April 13, 2004	Catalina	CSS	·	4.0 km	MPC · JPL
303204	2004 GV_{77}	—	April 15, 2004	Socorro	LINEAR	GAL	2.0 km	MPC · JPL
303205	2004 GQ_{83}	—	April 14, 2004	Palomar	NEAT	·	4.8 km	MPC · JPL
303206	2004 HH_{7}	—	April 19, 2004	Kitt Peak	Spacewatch	MRX	1.3 km	MPC · JPL
303207	2004 HH_{39}	—	April 17, 2004	Kitt Peak	Spacewatch	·	2.0 km	MPC · JPL
303208	2004 HN_{46}	—	April 22, 2004	Kitt Peak	Spacewatch	·	2.5 km	MPC · JPL
303209	2004 HG_{50}	—	April 23, 2004	Socorro	LINEAR	·	4.5 km	MPC · JPL
303210	2004 HV_{58}	—	April 24, 2004	Kitt Peak	Spacewatch	·	2.0 km	MPC · JPL
303211	2004 HZ_{63}	—	April 23, 2004	Socorro	LINEAR	EUP	3.9 km	MPC · JPL
303212	2004 JN_{10}	—	May 12, 2004	Catalina	CSS	·	3.0 km	MPC · JPL
303213	2004 JZ_{20}	—	May 9, 2004	Kitt Peak	Spacewatch	BRA	1.9 km	MPC · JPL
303214	2004 JY_{21}	—	May 9, 2004	Kitt Peak	Spacewatch	·	2.7 km	MPC · JPL
303215	2004 JJ_{29}	—	May 15, 2004	Socorro	LINEAR	TIR	2.5 km	MPC · JPL
303216	2004 JV_{34}	—	May 15, 2004	Socorro	LINEAR	·	4.4 km	MPC · JPL
303217	2004 JG_{49}	—	May 13, 2004	Kitt Peak	Spacewatch	·	2.3 km	MPC · JPL
303218	2004 KX	—	May 17, 2004	Reedy Creek	J. Broughton	·	3.5 km	MPC · JPL
303219	2004 KX_{10}	—	May 19, 2004	Kitt Peak	Spacewatch	·	3.2 km	MPC · JPL
303220	2004 MM_{6}	—	June 21, 2004	Socorro	LINEAR	·	5.7 km	MPC · JPL
303221	2004 NC	—	July 6, 2004	Campo Imperatore	CINEOS	·	750 m	MPC · JPL
303222	2004 NV	—	July 7, 2004	Campo Imperatore	CINEOS	·	930 m	MPC · JPL
303223	2004 NW_{10}	—	July 10, 2004	Catalina	CSS	·	1.2 km	MPC · JPL
303224	2004 NZ_{29}	—	July 14, 2004	Socorro	LINEAR	·	650 m	MPC · JPL
303225	2004 NO_{30}	—	July 14, 2004	Siding Spring	SSS	·	4.9 km	MPC · JPL
303226	2004 NY_{30}	—	July 9, 2004	Anderson Mesa	LONEOS	T_{j} (2.9) · CYB	7.1 km	MPC · JPL
303227	2004 NM_{33}	—	July 15, 2004	Socorro	LINEAR	·	650 m	MPC · JPL
303228	2004 OQ_{6}	—	July 16, 2004	Socorro	LINEAR	·	680 m	MPC · JPL
303229	2004 OU_{8}	—	July 18, 2004	Socorro	LINEAR	·	990 m	MPC · JPL
303230	2004 PZ	—	August 6, 2004	Palomar	NEAT	·	840 m	MPC · JPL
303231	2004 PF_{22}	—	August 8, 2004	Socorro	LINEAR	·	740 m	MPC · JPL
303232	2004 PG_{25}	—	August 8, 2004	Palomar	NEAT	·	750 m	MPC · JPL
303233	2004 PD_{26}	—	August 8, 2004	Socorro	LINEAR	·	460 m	MPC · JPL
303234	2004 PA_{34}	—	August 8, 2004	Anderson Mesa	LONEOS	·	790 m	MPC · JPL
303235	2004 PL_{37}	—	August 9, 2004	Anderson Mesa	LONEOS	·	800 m	MPC · JPL
303236	2004 PJ_{40}	—	August 9, 2004	Socorro	LINEAR	·	1.0 km	MPC · JPL
303237	2004 PS_{41}	—	August 8, 2004	Socorro	LINEAR	·	730 m	MPC · JPL
303238	2004 PC_{50}	—	August 8, 2004	Socorro	LINEAR	CYB	5.0 km	MPC · JPL
303239	2004 PF_{54}	—	August 8, 2004	Anderson Mesa	LONEOS	·	820 m	MPC · JPL
303240	2004 PP_{68}	—	August 6, 2004	Campo Imperatore	CINEOS	·	720 m	MPC · JPL
303241	2004 PP_{86}	—	August 11, 2004	Socorro	LINEAR	·	780 m	MPC · JPL
303242	2004 PM_{100}	—	August 12, 2004	Socorro	LINEAR	·	970 m	MPC · JPL
303243	2004 PB_{114}	—	August 10, 2004	Socorro	LINEAR	·	1 km	MPC · JPL
303244	2004 QQ_{4}	—	August 19, 2004	Modra	J. Világi, L. Kornoš	·	1.1 km	MPC · JPL
303245	2004 QB_{9}	—	August 19, 2004	Siding Spring	SSS	·	1.1 km	MPC · JPL
303246	2004 QO_{9}	—	August 21, 2004	Siding Spring	SSS	·	800 m	MPC · JPL
303247	2004 QE_{10}	—	August 21, 2004	Siding Spring	SSS	·	1.5 km	MPC · JPL
303248	2004 QV_{16}	—	August 25, 2004	Anderson Mesa	LONEOS	APO +1km	820 m	MPC · JPL
303249	2004 QL_{24}	—	August 26, 2004	Goodricke-Pigott	R. A. Tucker	·	1.1 km	MPC · JPL
303250	2004 RU_{10}	—	September 7, 2004	Socorro	LINEAR	ATE +1km	930 m	MPC · JPL
303251	2004 RW_{21}	—	September 7, 2004	Kitt Peak	Spacewatch	·	880 m	MPC · JPL
303252	2004 RZ_{21}	—	September 7, 2004	Kitt Peak	Spacewatch	·	630 m	MPC · JPL
303253	2004 RD_{35}	—	September 7, 2004	Socorro	LINEAR	·	830 m	MPC · JPL
303254	2004 RE_{43}	—	September 8, 2004	Socorro	LINEAR	·	760 m	MPC · JPL
303255	2004 RZ_{43}	—	September 8, 2004	Socorro	LINEAR	·	840 m	MPC · JPL
303256	2004 RW_{46}	—	September 8, 2004	Socorro	LINEAR	·	830 m	MPC · JPL
303257	2004 RO_{50}	—	September 8, 2004	Socorro	LINEAR	V	810 m	MPC · JPL
303258	2004 RO_{56}	—	September 8, 2004	Socorro	LINEAR	·	810 m	MPC · JPL
303259	2004 RU_{73}	—	September 8, 2004	Socorro	LINEAR	·	890 m	MPC · JPL
303260	2004 RP_{74}	—	September 8, 2004	Socorro	LINEAR	·	1.2 km	MPC · JPL
303261	2004 RV_{79}	—	September 7, 2004	Socorro	LINEAR	PHO	1.1 km	MPC · JPL
303262	2004 RJ_{84}	—	September 10, 2004	Socorro	LINEAR	APO	660 m	MPC · JPL
303263	2004 RJ_{102}	—	September 8, 2004	Socorro	LINEAR	·	880 m	MPC · JPL
303264	2004 RV_{105}	—	September 8, 2004	Palomar	NEAT	·	900 m	MPC · JPL
303265 Littmann	2004 RH_{111}	Littmann	September 8, 2004	Wrightwood	J. W. Young	V	730 m	MPC · JPL
303266	2004 RX_{125}	—	September 7, 2004	Kitt Peak	Spacewatch	·	830 m	MPC · JPL
303267	2004 RV_{136}	—	September 8, 2004	Campo Imperatore	CINEOS	·	770 m	MPC · JPL
303268	2004 RT_{141}	—	September 8, 2004	Socorro	LINEAR	·	1 km	MPC · JPL
303269	2004 RN_{155}	—	September 10, 2004	Socorro	LINEAR	·	850 m	MPC · JPL
303270	2004 RO_{155}	—	September 10, 2004	Socorro	LINEAR	·	800 m	MPC · JPL
303271	2004 RE_{170}	—	September 8, 2004	Socorro	LINEAR	·	1.2 km	MPC · JPL
303272	2004 RF_{170}	—	September 8, 2004	Palomar	NEAT	·	780 m	MPC · JPL
303273	2004 RD_{172}	—	September 9, 2004	Socorro	LINEAR	·	860 m	MPC · JPL
303274	2004 RM_{180}	—	September 10, 2004	Socorro	LINEAR	·	790 m	MPC · JPL
303275	2004 RF_{188}	—	September 10, 2004	Socorro	LINEAR	·	1.0 km	MPC · JPL
303276	2004 RA_{189}	—	September 10, 2004	Socorro	LINEAR	·	1.2 km	MPC · JPL
303277	2004 RC_{190}	—	September 10, 2004	Socorro	LINEAR	·	1.1 km	MPC · JPL
303278	2004 RB_{191}	—	September 10, 2004	Socorro	LINEAR	·	880 m	MPC · JPL
303279	2004 RK_{191}	—	September 10, 2004	Socorro	LINEAR	V	960 m	MPC · JPL
303280	2004 RH_{194}	—	September 10, 2004	Socorro	LINEAR	·	910 m	MPC · JPL
303281	2004 RE_{231}	—	September 9, 2004	Kitt Peak	Spacewatch	·	960 m	MPC · JPL
303282	2004 RH_{251}	—	September 14, 2004	Palomar	NEAT	·	750 m	MPC · JPL
303283	2004 RA_{265}	—	September 10, 2004	Kitt Peak	Spacewatch	·	680 m	MPC · JPL
303284	2004 RJ_{294}	—	September 11, 2004	Kitt Peak	Spacewatch	·	730 m	MPC · JPL
303285	2004 RG_{311}	—	September 13, 2004	Palomar	NEAT	PHO	2.7 km	MPC · JPL
303286	2004 RH_{335}	—	September 15, 2004	Kitt Peak	Spacewatch	·	1.0 km	MPC · JPL
303287	2004 RQ_{336}	—	September 15, 2004	Kitt Peak	Spacewatch	·	970 m	MPC · JPL
303288	2004 RV_{336}	—	September 15, 2004	Kitt Peak	Spacewatch	·	840 m	MPC · JPL
303289	2004 RH_{337}	—	September 15, 2004	Kitt Peak	Spacewatch	SYL · CYB	5.3 km	MPC · JPL
303290	2004 RO_{345}	—	September 14, 2004	Anderson Mesa	LONEOS	·	770 m	MPC · JPL
303291	2004 RQ_{345}	—	September 7, 2004	Socorro	LINEAR	·	940 m	MPC · JPL
303292	2004 SV_{3}	—	September 17, 2004	Socorro	LINEAR	·	760 m	MPC · JPL
303293	2004 SU_{4}	—	September 17, 2004	Kitt Peak	Spacewatch	·	860 m	MPC · JPL
303294	2004 SR_{8}	—	September 17, 2004	Socorro	LINEAR	·	840 m	MPC · JPL
303295	2004 SB_{13}	—	September 17, 2004	Anderson Mesa	LONEOS	·	770 m	MPC · JPL
303296	2004 ST_{14}	—	September 17, 2004	Anderson Mesa	LONEOS	·	970 m	MPC · JPL
303297	2004 SN_{16}	—	September 17, 2004	Anderson Mesa	LONEOS	·	1.4 km	MPC · JPL
303298	2004 SD_{24}	—	September 17, 2004	Kitt Peak	Spacewatch	·	1.1 km	MPC · JPL
303299	2004 SM_{40}	—	September 17, 2004	Socorro	LINEAR	·	1.1 km	MPC · JPL
303300	2004 SM_{55}	—	September 23, 2004	Kitt Peak	Spacewatch	·	740 m	MPC · JPL

== 303301–303400 ==
back to top

Designation			Discovery			Properties		Ref
Permanent	Provisional	Named after	Date	Site	Discoverer(s)	Category	Diam.	Ref
303301	2004 TQ_{4}	—	October 4, 2004	Kitt Peak	Spacewatch	NYS	1.0 km	MPC · JPL
303302	2004 TQ_{5}	—	October 5, 2004	Kitt Peak	Spacewatch	·	740 m	MPC · JPL
303303	2004 TW_{15}	—	October 9, 2004	Socorro	LINEAR	·	910 m	MPC · JPL
303304	2004 TW_{17}	—	October 11, 2004	Moletai	K. Černis, Zdanavicius, J.	·	1.3 km	MPC · JPL
303305	2004 TS_{19}	—	October 13, 2004	Goodricke-Pigott	R. A. Tucker	·	1.1 km	MPC · JPL
303306	2004 TU_{21}	—	October 4, 2004	Kitt Peak	Spacewatch	·	810 m	MPC · JPL
303307	2004 TG_{32}	—	October 4, 2004	Kitt Peak	Spacewatch	·	2.3 km	MPC · JPL
303308	2004 TV_{38}	—	October 4, 2004	Kitt Peak	Spacewatch	MAS	710 m	MPC · JPL
303309	2004 TV_{41}	—	October 4, 2004	Kitt Peak	Spacewatch	·	1.1 km	MPC · JPL
303310	2004 TV_{43}	—	October 4, 2004	Kitt Peak	Spacewatch	·	810 m	MPC · JPL
303311	2004 TB_{46}	—	October 4, 2004	Kitt Peak	Spacewatch	SYL · CYB	5.6 km	MPC · JPL
303312	2004 TJ_{47}	—	October 4, 2004	Kitt Peak	Spacewatch	·	1.0 km	MPC · JPL
303313	2004 TU_{50}	—	October 4, 2004	Kitt Peak	Spacewatch	V	790 m	MPC · JPL
303314	2004 TA_{56}	—	October 4, 2004	Kitt Peak	Spacewatch	·	950 m	MPC · JPL
303315	2004 TX_{58}	—	October 5, 2004	Kitt Peak	Spacewatch	·	940 m	MPC · JPL
303316	2004 TB_{62}	—	October 5, 2004	Anderson Mesa	LONEOS	·	810 m	MPC · JPL
303317	2004 TT_{73}	—	October 6, 2004	Kitt Peak	Spacewatch	·	1.0 km	MPC · JPL
303318	2004 TL_{75}	—	October 6, 2004	Kitt Peak	Spacewatch	·	1.0 km	MPC · JPL
303319	2004 TZ_{77}	—	October 4, 2004	Kitt Peak	Spacewatch	·	1.1 km	MPC · JPL
303320	2004 TF_{80}	—	October 5, 2004	Kitt Peak	Spacewatch	·	1.0 km	MPC · JPL
303321	2004 TR_{81}	—	October 5, 2004	Kitt Peak	Spacewatch	·	990 m	MPC · JPL
303322	2004 TV_{94}	—	October 5, 2004	Kitt Peak	Spacewatch	·	1.3 km	MPC · JPL
303323	2004 TZ_{94}	—	October 5, 2004	Kitt Peak	Spacewatch	V	760 m	MPC · JPL
303324	2004 TU_{103}	—	October 7, 2004	Anderson Mesa	LONEOS	·	2.4 km	MPC · JPL
303325	2004 TH_{105}	—	October 7, 2004	Kitt Peak	Spacewatch	·	690 m	MPC · JPL
303326	2004 TS_{110}	—	October 7, 2004	Anderson Mesa	LONEOS	·	1.1 km	MPC · JPL
303327	2004 TB_{111}	—	October 7, 2004	Socorro	LINEAR	PHO	2.8 km	MPC · JPL
303328	2004 TO_{112}	—	October 7, 2004	Palomar	NEAT	·	1.3 km	MPC · JPL
303329	2004 TH_{119}	—	October 6, 2004	Socorro	LINEAR	(2076)	820 m	MPC · JPL
303330	2004 TY_{119}	—	October 6, 2004	Palomar	NEAT	·	790 m	MPC · JPL
303331	2004 TH_{122}	—	October 7, 2004	Anderson Mesa	LONEOS	V	670 m	MPC · JPL
303332	2004 TQ_{123}	—	October 7, 2004	Anderson Mesa	LONEOS	·	890 m	MPC · JPL
303333	2004 TY_{131}	—	October 7, 2004	Anderson Mesa	LONEOS	·	1.1 km	MPC · JPL
303334	2004 TU_{142}	—	October 4, 2004	Kitt Peak	Spacewatch	·	810 m	MPC · JPL
303335	2004 TF_{145}	—	October 4, 2004	Kitt Peak	Spacewatch	·	1.3 km	MPC · JPL
303336	2004 TK_{157}	—	October 6, 2004	Kitt Peak	Spacewatch	·	1.2 km	MPC · JPL
303337	2004 TH_{163}	—	October 6, 2004	Kitt Peak	Spacewatch	·	1.2 km	MPC · JPL
303338	2004 TB_{173}	—	October 8, 2004	Socorro	LINEAR	·	1.3 km	MPC · JPL
303339	2004 TP_{196}	—	October 7, 2004	Kitt Peak	Spacewatch	·	900 m	MPC · JPL
303340	2004 TP_{203}	—	October 7, 2004	Kitt Peak	Spacewatch	·	1.9 km	MPC · JPL
303341	2004 TO_{209}	—	October 8, 2004	Kitt Peak	Spacewatch	·	780 m	MPC · JPL
303342	2004 TQ_{210}	—	October 8, 2004	Kitt Peak	Spacewatch	V	590 m	MPC · JPL
303343	2004 TA_{213}	—	October 8, 2004	Kitt Peak	Spacewatch	·	1.0 km	MPC · JPL
303344	2004 TB_{213}	—	October 8, 2004	Kitt Peak	Spacewatch	·	1.4 km	MPC · JPL
303345	2004 TD_{221}	—	October 7, 2004	Socorro	LINEAR	V	950 m	MPC · JPL
303346	2004 TB_{222}	—	October 7, 2004	Socorro	LINEAR	·	1.0 km	MPC · JPL
303347	2004 TH_{249}	—	October 7, 2004	Kitt Peak	Spacewatch	·	1.1 km	MPC · JPL
303348	2004 TA_{250}	—	October 7, 2004	Kitt Peak	Spacewatch	V	890 m	MPC · JPL
303349	2004 TW_{273}	—	October 9, 2004	Kitt Peak	Spacewatch	(2076)	1.2 km	MPC · JPL
303350	2004 TE_{294}	—	October 10, 2004	Kitt Peak	Spacewatch	·	840 m	MPC · JPL
303351	2004 TS_{295}	—	October 10, 2004	Kitt Peak	Spacewatch	·	890 m	MPC · JPL
303352	2004 TN_{298}	—	October 13, 2004	Kitt Peak	Spacewatch	·	1.2 km	MPC · JPL
303353	2004 TQ_{325}	—	October 13, 2004	Kitt Peak	Spacewatch	V	890 m	MPC · JPL
303354	2004 TR_{327}	—	October 3, 2004	Palomar	NEAT	V	800 m	MPC · JPL
303355	2004 TU_{330}	—	October 9, 2004	Socorro	LINEAR	·	1.3 km	MPC · JPL
303356	2004 TD_{334}	—	October 9, 2004	Kitt Peak	Spacewatch	(2076)	760 m	MPC · JPL
303357	2004 TY_{345}	—	October 15, 2004	Socorro	LINEAR	(2076)	1.1 km	MPC · JPL
303358	2004 TO_{346}	—	October 15, 2004	Anderson Mesa	LONEOS	·	1.1 km	MPC · JPL
303359	2004 TM_{357}	—	October 7, 2004	Socorro	LINEAR	PHO	1.2 km	MPC · JPL
303360	2004 TP_{359}	—	October 9, 2004	Socorro	LINEAR	·	740 m	MPC · JPL
303361	2004 TY_{366}	—	October 15, 2004	Mount Lemmon	Mount Lemmon Survey	(2076)	860 m	MPC · JPL
303362	2004 UR_{7}	—	October 21, 2004	Socorro	LINEAR	V	810 m	MPC · JPL
303363	2004 UQ_{9}	—	October 23, 2004	Goodricke-Pigott	Goodricke-Pigott	·	800 m	MPC · JPL
303364	2004 VM_{5}	—	November 3, 2004	Anderson Mesa	LONEOS	·	970 m	MPC · JPL
303365	2004 VX_{17}	—	November 3, 2004	Palomar	NEAT	·	1.1 km	MPC · JPL
303366	2004 VK_{20}	—	November 4, 2004	Catalina	CSS	·	1.4 km	MPC · JPL
303367	2004 VE_{23}	—	November 5, 2004	Campo Imperatore	CINEOS	·	1.1 km	MPC · JPL
303368	2004 VH_{23}	—	November 5, 2004	Palomar	NEAT	·	2.4 km	MPC · JPL
303369	2004 VJ_{26}	—	November 4, 2004	Catalina	CSS	·	1.3 km	MPC · JPL
303370	2004 VR_{28}	—	November 7, 2004	Socorro	LINEAR	PHO	1.2 km	MPC · JPL
303371	2004 VT_{44}	—	November 4, 2004	Kitt Peak	Spacewatch	PHO	1.9 km	MPC · JPL
303372	2004 VT_{51}	—	November 4, 2004	Kitt Peak	Spacewatch	NYS	1.1 km	MPC · JPL
303373	2004 VS_{53}	—	November 7, 2004	Socorro	LINEAR	·	890 m	MPC · JPL
303374	2004 VU_{56}	—	November 4, 2004	Catalina	CSS	V	890 m	MPC · JPL
303375	2004 VA_{65}	—	November 10, 2004	Kitt Peak	Spacewatch	·	2.3 km	MPC · JPL
303376	2004 VN_{95}	—	November 11, 2004	Kitt Peak	Spacewatch	(2076)	1.2 km	MPC · JPL
303377	2004 WZ_{1}	—	November 17, 2004	Campo Imperatore	CINEOS	·	1.2 km	MPC · JPL
303378	2004 WD_{2}	—	November 18, 2004	Socorro	LINEAR	·	1.2 km	MPC · JPL
303379	2004 XS	—	December 1, 2004	Palomar	NEAT	·	1.1 km	MPC · JPL
303380	2004 XW_{7}	—	December 2, 2004	Palomar	NEAT	V	820 m	MPC · JPL
303381	2004 XM_{9}	—	December 2, 2004	Catalina	CSS	V	830 m	MPC · JPL
303382	2004 XD_{23}	—	December 8, 2004	Socorro	LINEAR	NYS	1.7 km	MPC · JPL
303383	2004 XP_{28}	—	December 10, 2004	Socorro	LINEAR	NYS	1.3 km	MPC · JPL
303384	2004 XH_{32}	—	December 10, 2004	Socorro	LINEAR	·	1.6 km	MPC · JPL
303385	2004 XV_{32}	—	December 10, 2004	Socorro	LINEAR	·	1.6 km	MPC · JPL
303386	2004 XM_{42}	—	December 2, 2004	Catalina	CSS	V	1.0 km	MPC · JPL
303387	2004 XU_{42}	—	December 9, 2004	Catalina	CSS	·	1.8 km	MPC · JPL
303388	2004 XO_{49}	—	December 9, 2004	Kitt Peak	Spacewatch	·	950 m	MPC · JPL
303389	2004 XM_{56}	—	December 10, 2004	Kitt Peak	Spacewatch	NYS	1.3 km	MPC · JPL
303390	2004 XW_{57}	—	December 10, 2004	Kitt Peak	Spacewatch	·	2.3 km	MPC · JPL
303391	2004 XU_{58}	—	December 10, 2004	Kitt Peak	Spacewatch	·	1.7 km	MPC · JPL
303392	2004 XT_{62}	—	December 10, 2004	Socorro	LINEAR	·	930 m	MPC · JPL
303393	2004 XL_{70}	—	December 11, 2004	Socorro	LINEAR	·	1.1 km	MPC · JPL
303394	2004 XV_{81}	—	December 10, 2004	Kitt Peak	Spacewatch	·	1.8 km	MPC · JPL
303395	2004 XQ_{90}	—	December 11, 2004	Kitt Peak	Spacewatch	V	970 m	MPC · JPL
303396	2004 XQ_{97}	—	December 11, 2004	Kitt Peak	Spacewatch	·	1.3 km	MPC · JPL
303397	2004 XZ_{101}	—	December 10, 2004	Kitt Peak	Spacewatch	·	1.3 km	MPC · JPL
303398	2004 XZ_{103}	—	December 9, 2004	Kitt Peak	Spacewatch	·	1.1 km	MPC · JPL
303399	2004 XO_{105}	—	December 11, 2004	Socorro	LINEAR	·	1.4 km	MPC · JPL
303400	2004 XC_{109}	—	December 12, 2004	Socorro	LINEAR	·	1.4 km	MPC · JPL

== 303401–303500 ==
back to top

Designation			Discovery			Properties		Ref
Permanent	Provisional	Named after	Date	Site	Discoverer(s)	Category	Diam.	Ref
303401	2004 XA_{110}	—	December 14, 2004	Anderson Mesa	LONEOS	·	1.0 km	MPC · JPL
303402	2004 XG_{119}	—	December 12, 2004	Kitt Peak	Spacewatch	·	1.3 km	MPC · JPL
303403	2004 XN_{119}	—	December 12, 2004	Kitt Peak	Spacewatch	·	1.6 km	MPC · JPL
303404	2004 XT_{147}	—	December 13, 2004	Kitt Peak	Spacewatch	·	1.7 km	MPC · JPL
303405	2004 XM_{158}	—	December 14, 2004	Kitt Peak	Spacewatch	·	1.4 km	MPC · JPL
303406	2004 XX_{158}	—	December 14, 2004	Kitt Peak	Spacewatch	·	1.5 km	MPC · JPL
303407	2004 XM_{159}	—	December 14, 2004	Catalina	CSS	·	1.9 km	MPC · JPL
303408	2004 XM_{171}	—	December 10, 2004	Kitt Peak	Spacewatch	·	1.3 km	MPC · JPL
303409	2004 XJ_{176}	—	December 11, 2004	Kitt Peak	Spacewatch	·	1.5 km	MPC · JPL
303410	2004 XX_{180}	—	December 14, 2004	Campo Imperatore	CINEOS	3:2	4.8 km	MPC · JPL
303411	2004 XH_{181}	—	December 15, 2004	Socorro	LINEAR	·	1.3 km	MPC · JPL
303412	2004 YE_{6}	—	December 16, 2004	Kitt Peak	Spacewatch	·	1.2 km	MPC · JPL
303413	2004 YK_{13}	—	December 18, 2004	Mount Lemmon	Mount Lemmon Survey	·	1.5 km	MPC · JPL
303414	2004 YB_{14}	—	December 18, 2004	Mount Lemmon	Mount Lemmon Survey	MAS	870 m	MPC · JPL
303415	2004 YF_{14}	—	December 18, 2004	Mount Lemmon	Mount Lemmon Survey	·	1.7 km	MPC · JPL
303416	2004 YF_{18}	—	December 18, 2004	Mount Lemmon	Mount Lemmon Survey	MAS	760 m	MPC · JPL
303417	2004 YH_{25}	—	December 18, 2004	Mount Lemmon	Mount Lemmon Survey	·	1.5 km	MPC · JPL
303418	2005 AO	—	January 5, 2005	Pla D'Arguines	D'Arguines, Pla	·	1 km	MPC · JPL
303419	2005 AV_{1}	—	January 1, 2005	Catalina	CSS	·	1.4 km	MPC · JPL
303420	2005 AA_{4}	—	January 6, 2005	Catalina	CSS	·	1.1 km	MPC · JPL
303421	2005 AO_{4}	—	January 6, 2005	Catalina	CSS	V	890 m	MPC · JPL
303422	2005 AS_{4}	—	January 6, 2005	Catalina	CSS	·	1.8 km	MPC · JPL
303423	2005 AN_{5}	—	January 6, 2005	Catalina	CSS	·	1.6 km	MPC · JPL
303424	2005 AV_{5}	—	January 6, 2005	Catalina	CSS	NYS	1.7 km	MPC · JPL
303425	2005 AZ_{5}	—	January 6, 2005	Catalina	CSS	ERI	1.7 km	MPC · JPL
303426	2005 AJ_{6}	—	January 6, 2005	Socorro	LINEAR	NYS	1.2 km	MPC · JPL
303427	2005 AQ_{6}	—	January 6, 2005	Catalina	CSS	PHO	1.1 km	MPC · JPL
303428	2005 AV_{14}	—	January 6, 2005	Catalina	CSS	·	1.6 km	MPC · JPL
303429	2005 AR_{21}	—	January 6, 2005	Catalina	CSS	·	1.4 km	MPC · JPL
303430	2005 AV_{22}	—	January 7, 2005	Socorro	LINEAR	NYS	1.3 km	MPC · JPL
303431	2005 AO_{31}	—	January 11, 2005	Socorro	LINEAR	·	1.4 km	MPC · JPL
303432	2005 AW_{33}	—	January 13, 2005	Kitt Peak	Spacewatch	V	860 m	MPC · JPL
303433	2005 AA_{36}	—	January 13, 2005	Socorro	LINEAR	PHO	1.4 km	MPC · JPL
303434	2005 AY_{36}	—	January 13, 2005	Socorro	LINEAR	·	1.7 km	MPC · JPL
303435	2005 AE_{45}	—	January 15, 2005	Kitt Peak	Spacewatch	NYS	1.4 km	MPC · JPL
303436	2005 AH_{50}	—	January 13, 2005	Catalina	CSS	·	1.4 km	MPC · JPL
303437	2005 AO_{51}	—	January 13, 2005	Catalina	CSS	·	1.5 km	MPC · JPL
303438	2005 AK_{54}	—	January 13, 2005	Kitt Peak	Spacewatch	·	1.3 km	MPC · JPL
303439	2005 AH_{58}	—	January 15, 2005	Socorro	LINEAR	NYS	1.2 km	MPC · JPL
303440	2005 AR_{60}	—	January 15, 2005	Kitt Peak	Spacewatch	·	1.6 km	MPC · JPL
303441	2005 AV_{60}	—	January 15, 2005	Kitt Peak	Spacewatch	·	1.4 km	MPC · JPL
303442	2005 AF_{65}	—	January 13, 2005	Kitt Peak	Spacewatch	·	1.2 km	MPC · JPL
303443	2005 AE_{67}	—	January 13, 2005	Kitt Peak	Spacewatch	·	1.0 km	MPC · JPL
303444	2005 AA_{77}	—	January 15, 2005	Kitt Peak	Spacewatch	·	1.4 km	MPC · JPL
303445	2005 AL_{78}	—	January 15, 2005	Kitt Peak	Spacewatch	NYS	1.4 km	MPC · JPL
303446	2005 AR_{79}	—	January 15, 2005	Kitt Peak	Spacewatch	·	1.1 km	MPC · JPL
303447	2005 AT_{79}	—	January 15, 2005	Kitt Peak	Spacewatch	·	1.3 km	MPC · JPL
303448	2005 AD_{81}	—	January 15, 2005	Kitt Peak	Spacewatch	NYS	1.4 km	MPC · JPL
303449	2005 BE_{2}	—	January 18, 2005	Kitt Peak	Spacewatch	APO +1km	790 m	MPC · JPL
303450	2005 BY_{2}	—	January 19, 2005	Socorro	LINEAR	APO · PHA	190 m	MPC · JPL
303451	2005 BX_{4}	—	January 16, 2005	Socorro	LINEAR	MAS	840 m	MPC · JPL
303452	2005 BL_{14}	—	January 20, 2005	Wrightwood	J. W. Young	·	1.4 km	MPC · JPL
303453	2005 BC_{18}	—	January 16, 2005	Socorro	LINEAR	·	1.8 km	MPC · JPL
303454	2005 BN_{20}	—	January 16, 2005	Kitt Peak	Spacewatch	·	1.1 km	MPC · JPL
303455	2005 BY_{21}	—	January 16, 2005	Kitt Peak	Spacewatch	T_{j} (2.99) · 3:2 · SHU	4.6 km	MPC · JPL
303456	2005 CJ_{2}	—	February 1, 2005	Catalina	CSS	·	2.4 km	MPC · JPL
303457	2005 CU_{4}	—	February 1, 2005	Catalina	CSS	·	1.4 km	MPC · JPL
303458	2005 CF_{8}	—	February 1, 2005	Catalina	CSS	·	1.4 km	MPC · JPL
303459	2005 CF_{9}	—	February 1, 2005	Kitt Peak	Spacewatch	·	1.4 km	MPC · JPL
303460	2005 CD_{13}	—	February 2, 2005	Kitt Peak	Spacewatch	NYS	1.1 km	MPC · JPL
303461	2005 CR_{14}	—	February 2, 2005	Kitt Peak	Spacewatch	V	720 m	MPC · JPL
303462	2005 CF_{17}	—	February 2, 2005	Socorro	LINEAR	NYS	1.1 km	MPC · JPL
303463	2005 CO_{23}	—	February 2, 2005	Catalina	CSS	·	2.1 km	MPC · JPL
303464	2005 CZ_{25}	—	February 5, 2005	Uccle	T. Pauwels	·	1.4 km	MPC · JPL
303465	2005 CM_{26}	—	February 1, 2005	Catalina	CSS	·	1.8 km	MPC · JPL
303466	2005 CZ_{30}	—	February 1, 2005	Kitt Peak	Spacewatch	·	1.3 km	MPC · JPL
303467	2005 CV_{42}	—	February 2, 2005	Socorro	LINEAR	·	1.2 km	MPC · JPL
303468	2005 CO_{43}	—	February 2, 2005	Catalina	CSS	NYS	1.2 km	MPC · JPL
303469	2005 CK_{52}	—	February 3, 2005	Socorro	LINEAR	·	2.0 km	MPC · JPL
303470	2005 CZ_{61}	—	February 13, 2005	La Silla	A. Boattini, H. Scholl	GAL	2.0 km	MPC · JPL
303471	2005 CY_{62}	—	February 9, 2005	Kitt Peak	Spacewatch	NYS	1.5 km	MPC · JPL
303472	2005 CM_{67}	—	February 15, 2005	Gnosca	S. Sposetti	·	2.0 km	MPC · JPL
303473	2005 CQ_{67}	—	February 1, 2005	Catalina	CSS	·	2.4 km	MPC · JPL
303474	2005 CJ_{68}	—	February 2, 2005	Catalina	CSS	·	1.8 km	MPC · JPL
303475	2005 CF_{79}	—	February 1, 2005	Kitt Peak	Spacewatch	·	1.6 km	MPC · JPL
303476	2005 EO_{10}	—	March 2, 2005	Kitt Peak	Spacewatch	·	1.1 km	MPC · JPL
303477	2005 EA_{21}	—	March 3, 2005	Catalina	CSS	MAS	950 m	MPC · JPL
303478	2005 EO_{21}	—	March 3, 2005	Catalina	CSS	·	1.5 km	MPC · JPL
303479	2005 EV_{28}	—	March 3, 2005	Catalina	CSS	·	2.5 km	MPC · JPL
303480	2005 EV_{30}	—	March 3, 2005	Catalina	CSS	·	1.3 km	MPC · JPL
303481	2005 EH_{31}	—	March 1, 2005	Catalina	CSS	·	1.7 km	MPC · JPL
303482	2005 ET_{47}	—	March 3, 2005	Catalina	CSS	·	2.3 km	MPC · JPL
303483	2005 EH_{50}	—	March 3, 2005	Catalina	CSS	·	1.6 km	MPC · JPL
303484	2005 EZ_{51}	—	March 3, 2005	Kitt Peak	Spacewatch	·	2.2 km	MPC · JPL
303485	2005 ET_{69}	—	March 8, 2005	Anderson Mesa	LONEOS	·	1.5 km	MPC · JPL
303486	2005 EJ_{71}	—	March 2, 2005	Catalina	CSS	·	1.9 km	MPC · JPL
303487	2005 EB_{77}	—	March 3, 2005	Kitt Peak	Spacewatch	·	2.1 km	MPC · JPL
303488	2005 EB_{91}	—	March 8, 2005	Mount Lemmon	Mount Lemmon Survey	·	1.7 km	MPC · JPL
303489	2005 EA_{101}	—	March 3, 2005	Catalina	CSS	·	2.1 km	MPC · JPL
303490	2005 EG_{101}	—	March 3, 2005	Catalina	CSS	RAF	1.0 km	MPC · JPL
303491	2005 EM_{102}	—	March 3, 2005	Kitt Peak	Spacewatch	·	2.2 km	MPC · JPL
303492	2005 ER_{109}	—	March 4, 2005	Mount Lemmon	Mount Lemmon Survey	EUN	1.6 km	MPC · JPL
303493	2005 EE_{119}	—	March 7, 2005	Socorro	LINEAR	·	1.5 km	MPC · JPL
303494	2005 EL_{121}	—	March 8, 2005	Socorro	LINEAR	·	1.4 km	MPC · JPL
303495	2005 EF_{125}	—	March 8, 2005	Mount Lemmon	Mount Lemmon Survey	·	1.5 km	MPC · JPL
303496	2005 EA_{129}	—	March 9, 2005	Kitt Peak	Spacewatch	·	1.4 km	MPC · JPL
303497	2005 EY_{130}	—	March 9, 2005	Mount Lemmon	Mount Lemmon Survey	·	1.6 km	MPC · JPL
303498	2005 EN_{135}	—	March 9, 2005	Goodricke-Pigott	R. A. Tucker	·	2.0 km	MPC · JPL
303499	2005 EY_{135}	—	March 9, 2005	Anderson Mesa	LONEOS	·	2.6 km	MPC · JPL
303500	2005 EZ_{141}	—	March 10, 2005	Catalina	CSS	·	1.7 km	MPC · JPL

== 303501–303600 ==
back to top

Designation			Discovery			Properties		Ref
Permanent	Provisional	Named after	Date	Site	Discoverer(s)	Category	Diam.	Ref
303501	2005 ES_{142}	—	March 10, 2005	Catalina	CSS	·	3.0 km	MPC · JPL
303502	2005 EW_{148}	—	March 10, 2005	Kitt Peak	Spacewatch	·	1.7 km	MPC · JPL
303503	2005 EP_{150}	—	March 10, 2005	Kitt Peak	Spacewatch	·	1.8 km	MPC · JPL
303504	2005 ES_{151}	—	March 10, 2005	Kitt Peak	Spacewatch	·	2.2 km	MPC · JPL
303505	2005 EW_{159}	—	March 9, 2005	Mount Lemmon	Mount Lemmon Survey	·	2.1 km	MPC · JPL
303506	2005 ET_{163}	—	March 10, 2005	Mount Lemmon	Mount Lemmon Survey	·	1.2 km	MPC · JPL
303507	2005 EE_{167}	—	March 11, 2005	Mount Lemmon	Mount Lemmon Survey	·	1.5 km	MPC · JPL
303508	2005 EN_{167}	—	March 11, 2005	Mount Lemmon	Mount Lemmon Survey	·	1.3 km	MPC · JPL
303509	2005 EF_{171}	—	March 7, 2005	Socorro	LINEAR	EUN	1.7 km	MPC · JPL
303510	2005 EH_{177}	—	March 8, 2005	Mount Lemmon	Mount Lemmon Survey	·	1.4 km	MPC · JPL
303511	2005 EL_{183}	—	March 9, 2005	Mount Lemmon	Mount Lemmon Survey	NYS	1.2 km	MPC · JPL
303512	2005 EN_{183}	—	March 9, 2005	Mount Lemmon	Mount Lemmon Survey	·	2.0 km	MPC · JPL
303513	2005 ET_{186}	—	March 10, 2005	Mount Lemmon	Mount Lemmon Survey	·	1.4 km	MPC · JPL
303514	2005 ES_{189}	—	March 11, 2005	Kitt Peak	Spacewatch	·	1.9 km	MPC · JPL
303515	2005 EN_{193}	—	March 11, 2005	Mount Lemmon	Mount Lemmon Survey	·	1.3 km	MPC · JPL
303516	2005 EW_{196}	—	March 11, 2005	Anderson Mesa	LONEOS	·	2.1 km	MPC · JPL
303517	2005 EV_{202}	—	March 10, 2005	Mount Lemmon	Mount Lemmon Survey	·	1.6 km	MPC · JPL
303518	2005 ED_{205}	—	March 11, 2005	Kitt Peak	Spacewatch	·	1.6 km	MPC · JPL
303519	2005 EH_{206}	—	March 13, 2005	Catalina	CSS	·	1.8 km	MPC · JPL
303520	2005 EA_{212}	—	March 4, 2005	Socorro	LINEAR	·	1.6 km	MPC · JPL
303521	2005 EP_{212}	—	March 4, 2005	Catalina	CSS	·	2.6 km	MPC · JPL
303522	2005 EX_{219}	—	March 10, 2005	Siding Spring	SSS	ADE	2.7 km	MPC · JPL
303523	2005 ER_{226}	—	March 9, 2005	Socorro	LINEAR	·	1.4 km	MPC · JPL
303524	2005 EM_{227}	—	March 9, 2005	Mount Lemmon	Mount Lemmon Survey	·	1.3 km	MPC · JPL
303525	2005 EQ_{227}	—	April 14, 2001	Kitt Peak	Spacewatch	·	2.0 km	MPC · JPL
303526	2005 ED_{234}	—	March 10, 2005	Anderson Mesa	LONEOS	V	990 m	MPC · JPL
303527	2005 EG_{234}	—	March 10, 2005	Anderson Mesa	LONEOS	·	2.0 km	MPC · JPL
303528	2005 EN_{248}	—	March 12, 2005	Kitt Peak	Spacewatch	·	1.2 km	MPC · JPL
303529	2005 ED_{249}	—	March 13, 2005	Kitt Peak	Spacewatch	MAS	750 m	MPC · JPL
303530	2005 EW_{257}	—	March 3, 2005	Kitt Peak	Spacewatch	·	1.7 km	MPC · JPL
303531	2005 EZ_{260}	—	March 12, 2005	Socorro	LINEAR	MAR	1.6 km	MPC · JPL
303532	2005 EA_{265}	—	March 13, 2005	Kitt Peak	Spacewatch	·	1.1 km	MPC · JPL
303533	2005 EM_{266}	—	March 13, 2005	Catalina	CSS	HNS	1.9 km	MPC · JPL
303534	2005 ES_{266}	—	March 13, 2005	Kitt Peak	Spacewatch	MAR	1.3 km	MPC · JPL
303535	2005 EK_{269}	—	March 15, 2005	Mount Lemmon	Mount Lemmon Survey	·	2.7 km	MPC · JPL
303536	2005 EW_{270}	—	March 13, 2005	Anderson Mesa	LONEOS	·	3.0 km	MPC · JPL
303537	2005 EM_{271}	—	March 10, 2005	Mount Lemmon	Mount Lemmon Survey	·	1.2 km	MPC · JPL
303538	2005 EV_{271}	—	March 3, 2005	Kitt Peak	Spacewatch	·	1.8 km	MPC · JPL
303539	2005 EF_{280}	—	March 10, 2005	Catalina	CSS	·	1.3 km	MPC · JPL
303540	2005 EU_{289}	—	March 9, 2005	Mount Lemmon	Mount Lemmon Survey	·	1.8 km	MPC · JPL
303541	2005 EQ_{312}	—	March 10, 2005	Kitt Peak	M. W. Buie	·	1.2 km	MPC · JPL
303542	2005 EE_{316}	—	March 11, 2005	Mount Lemmon	Mount Lemmon Survey	EUN	980 m	MPC · JPL
303543	2005 EG_{317}	—	March 12, 2005	Kitt Peak	M. W. Buie	·	1.3 km	MPC · JPL
303544	2005 EJ_{318}	—	March 8, 2005	Catalina	CSS	H	970 m	MPC · JPL
303545	2005 EQ_{324}	—	March 12, 2005	Mount Lemmon	Mount Lemmon Survey	·	2.1 km	MPC · JPL
303546 Bourbaki	2005 FR	Bourbaki	March 16, 2005	Saint-Sulpice	Saint-Sulpice	·	3.1 km	MPC · JPL
303547	2005 FY_{8}	—	March 16, 2005	Mount Lemmon	Mount Lemmon Survey	·	1.6 km	MPC · JPL
303548	2005 GM	—	April 1, 2005	Anderson Mesa	LONEOS	TIN	2.4 km	MPC · JPL
303549	2005 GN_{5}	—	April 1, 2005	Kitt Peak	Spacewatch	·	1.6 km	MPC · JPL
303550	2005 GW_{5}	—	April 1, 2005	Kitt Peak	Spacewatch	·	2.2 km	MPC · JPL
303551	2005 GG_{9}	—	April 2, 2005	Mount Lemmon	Mount Lemmon Survey	H	600 m	MPC · JPL
303552	2005 GO_{12}	—	April 1, 2005	Anderson Mesa	LONEOS	·	2.2 km	MPC · JPL
303553	2005 GL_{21}	—	April 3, 2005	Palomar	NEAT	EUN	1.4 km	MPC · JPL
303554	2005 GA_{34}	—	April 6, 2005	Siding Spring	SSS	H	1.3 km	MPC · JPL
303555	2005 GY_{34}	—	April 2, 2005	Mount Lemmon	Mount Lemmon Survey	MAS	660 m	MPC · JPL
303556	2005 GH_{44}	—	April 5, 2005	Anderson Mesa	LONEOS	·	2.3 km	MPC · JPL
303557	2005 GU_{44}	—	April 5, 2005	Mount Lemmon	Mount Lemmon Survey	MIS	2.7 km	MPC · JPL
303558	2005 GM_{47}	—	April 5, 2005	Mount Lemmon	Mount Lemmon Survey	·	1.3 km	MPC · JPL
303559	2005 GT_{51}	—	April 2, 2005	Mount Lemmon	Mount Lemmon Survey	WIT	1.1 km	MPC · JPL
303560	2005 GO_{53}	—	April 2, 2005	Mount Lemmon	Mount Lemmon Survey	·	2.0 km	MPC · JPL
303561	2005 GY_{55}	—	April 6, 2005	Mount Lemmon	Mount Lemmon Survey	·	1.8 km	MPC · JPL
303562	2005 GT_{56}	—	April 6, 2005	Kitt Peak	Spacewatch	RAF	990 m	MPC · JPL
303563	2005 GW_{59}	—	April 1, 2005	Anderson Mesa	LONEOS	H	600 m	MPC · JPL
303564	2005 GD_{65}	—	April 2, 2005	Catalina	CSS	EUN	1.4 km	MPC · JPL
303565	2005 GP_{67}	—	April 2, 2005	Mount Lemmon	Mount Lemmon Survey	·	2.0 km	MPC · JPL
303566	2005 GR_{77}	—	April 6, 2005	Catalina	CSS	EUN	2.0 km	MPC · JPL
303567	2005 GS_{90}	—	April 6, 2005	Kitt Peak	Spacewatch	·	2.4 km	MPC · JPL
303568	2005 GS_{94}	—	April 6, 2005	Kitt Peak	Spacewatch	·	1.9 km	MPC · JPL
303569	2005 GK_{99}	—	April 7, 2005	Kitt Peak	Spacewatch	·	1.8 km	MPC · JPL
303570	2005 GB_{105}	—	April 10, 2005	Kitt Peak	Spacewatch	·	2.4 km	MPC · JPL
303571	2005 GB_{110}	—	April 10, 2005	Mount Lemmon	Mount Lemmon Survey	·	2.1 km	MPC · JPL
303572	2005 GH_{110}	—	April 10, 2005	Mount Lemmon	Mount Lemmon Survey	BRG	1.7 km	MPC · JPL
303573	2005 GC_{111}	—	April 4, 2005	Catalina	CSS	·	2.3 km	MPC · JPL
303574	2005 GW_{116}	—	April 11, 2005	Kitt Peak	Spacewatch	·	1.6 km	MPC · JPL
303575	2005 GL_{117}	—	April 11, 2005	Kitt Peak	Spacewatch	(13314)	2.6 km	MPC · JPL
303576	2005 GP_{123}	—	April 8, 2005	Socorro	LINEAR	·	3.5 km	MPC · JPL
303577	2005 GT_{123}	—	April 8, 2005	Socorro	LINEAR	·	3.7 km	MPC · JPL
303578	2005 GO_{124}	—	April 9, 2005	Catalina	CSS	·	3.3 km	MPC · JPL
303579	2005 GM_{127}	—	April 12, 2005	Mount Lemmon	Mount Lemmon Survey	(5)	1.4 km	MPC · JPL
303580	2005 GM_{131}	—	April 10, 2005	Kitt Peak	Spacewatch	MRX	1.2 km	MPC · JPL
303581	2005 GX_{132}	—	April 10, 2005	Kitt Peak	Spacewatch	·	1.6 km	MPC · JPL
303582	2005 GU_{134}	—	April 10, 2005	Mount Lemmon	Mount Lemmon Survey	NEM	2.4 km	MPC · JPL
303583	2005 GP_{140}	—	April 4, 2005	Catalina	CSS	·	2.0 km	MPC · JPL
303584	2005 GG_{141}	—	April 2, 2005	Catalina	CSS	H	680 m	MPC · JPL
303585	2005 GH_{145}	—	April 11, 2005	Kitt Peak	Spacewatch	·	2.0 km	MPC · JPL
303586	2005 GZ_{148}	—	April 11, 2005	Kitt Peak	Spacewatch	·	3.2 km	MPC · JPL
303587	2005 GJ_{149}	—	April 11, 2005	Kitt Peak	Spacewatch	·	2.1 km	MPC · JPL
303588	2005 GT_{150}	—	April 11, 2005	Kitt Peak	Spacewatch	·	2.4 km	MPC · JPL
303589	2005 GM_{157}	—	April 11, 2005	Kitt Peak	Spacewatch	(5)	1.1 km	MPC · JPL
303590	2005 GM_{173}	—	April 14, 2005	Kitt Peak	Spacewatch	·	2.1 km	MPC · JPL
303591	2005 GK_{176}	—	April 14, 2005	Kitt Peak	Spacewatch	NEM	3.0 km	MPC · JPL
303592	2005 GL_{176}	—	April 14, 2005	Kitt Peak	Spacewatch	·	3.4 km	MPC · JPL
303593	2005 GU_{182}	—	April 10, 2005	Kitt Peak	Spacewatch	·	2.1 km	MPC · JPL
303594	2005 GB_{192}	—	April 12, 2005	Kitt Peak	M. W. Buie	·	1.5 km	MPC · JPL
303595	2005 GZ_{199}	—	April 10, 2005	Kitt Peak	M. W. Buie	HOF	3.2 km	MPC · JPL
303596	2005 GP_{220}	—	April 5, 2005	Mount Lemmon	Mount Lemmon Survey	·	1.4 km	MPC · JPL
303597	2005 GU_{226}	—	April 14, 2005	Catalina	CSS	·	1.7 km	MPC · JPL
303598	2005 HR_{5}	—	April 30, 2005	Goodricke-Pigott	R. A. Tucker	·	2.6 km	MPC · JPL
303599	2005 HB_{6}	—	April 30, 2005	Kitt Peak	Spacewatch	·	2.6 km	MPC · JPL
303600	2005 JP_{1}	—	May 3, 2005	Socorro	LINEAR	RAF	1.4 km	MPC · JPL

== 303601–303700 ==
back to top

Designation			Discovery			Properties		Ref
Permanent	Provisional	Named after	Date	Site	Discoverer(s)	Category	Diam.	Ref
303601	2005 JU_{4}	—	May 1, 2005	Kitt Peak	Spacewatch	·	3.4 km	MPC · JPL
303602	2005 JH_{8}	—	May 4, 2005	Mauna Kea	Veillet, C.	·	1.7 km	MPC · JPL
303603	2005 JQ_{8}	—	May 4, 2005	Mauna Kea	Veillet, C.	·	1.6 km	MPC · JPL
303604	2005 JP_{19}	—	May 4, 2005	Kitt Peak	Spacewatch	HNS	1.5 km	MPC · JPL
303605	2005 JF_{20}	—	May 4, 2005	Catalina	CSS	(18466)	3.1 km	MPC · JPL
303606	2005 JP_{20}	—	May 4, 2005	Catalina	CSS	H	660 m	MPC · JPL
303607	2005 JG_{23}	—	May 2, 2005	Kitt Peak	Spacewatch	·	1.8 km	MPC · JPL
303608	2005 JS_{23}	—	May 3, 2005	Kitt Peak	Spacewatch	·	2.3 km	MPC · JPL
303609	2005 JK_{25}	—	May 3, 2005	Kitt Peak	Spacewatch	·	2.0 km	MPC · JPL
303610	2005 JP_{27}	—	May 3, 2005	Socorro	LINEAR	·	3.9 km	MPC · JPL
303611	2005 JG_{29}	—	May 3, 2005	Kitt Peak	Spacewatch	·	2.9 km	MPC · JPL
303612	2005 JF_{30}	—	May 4, 2005	Palomar	NEAT	·	2.5 km	MPC · JPL
303613	2005 JN_{33}	—	May 4, 2005	Mount Lemmon	Mount Lemmon Survey	·	4.6 km	MPC · JPL
303614	2005 JQ_{34}	—	May 4, 2005	Kitt Peak	Spacewatch	H	630 m	MPC · JPL
303615	2005 JK_{42}	—	May 8, 2005	Anderson Mesa	LONEOS	·	1.5 km	MPC · JPL
303616	2005 JV_{44}	—	May 4, 2005	Palomar	NEAT	H	950 m	MPC · JPL
303617	2005 JW_{47}	—	May 3, 2005	Kitt Peak	Spacewatch	·	2.4 km	MPC · JPL
303618	2005 JP_{49}	—	May 4, 2005	Kitt Peak	Spacewatch	GEF	1.6 km	MPC · JPL
303619	2005 JQ_{50}	—	May 4, 2005	Kitt Peak	Spacewatch	(7744)	1.6 km	MPC · JPL
303620	2005 JR_{50}	—	May 4, 2005	Kitt Peak	Spacewatch	·	2.5 km	MPC · JPL
303621	2005 JA_{53}	—	May 4, 2005	Mount Lemmon	Mount Lemmon Survey	·	2.2 km	MPC · JPL
303622	2005 JB_{54}	—	May 4, 2005	Kitt Peak	Spacewatch	·	2.0 km	MPC · JPL
303623	2005 JR_{66}	—	May 4, 2005	Palomar	NEAT	EUN	2.1 km	MPC · JPL
303624	2005 JS_{66}	—	May 4, 2005	Palomar	NEAT	·	1.8 km	MPC · JPL
303625	2005 JX_{67}	—	May 4, 2005	Palomar	NEAT	HNS	1.5 km	MPC · JPL
303626	2005 JK_{68}	—	May 6, 2005	Catalina	CSS	·	2.9 km	MPC · JPL
303627	2005 JU_{72}	—	May 8, 2005	Kitt Peak	Spacewatch	·	1.4 km	MPC · JPL
303628	2005 JO_{76}	—	May 9, 2005	Mount Lemmon	Mount Lemmon Survey	(18466)	3.0 km	MPC · JPL
303629	2005 JG_{80}	—	May 10, 2005	Catalina	CSS	H	800 m	MPC · JPL
303630	2005 JO_{81}	—	May 11, 2005	Kitt Peak	Spacewatch	EUN	1.5 km	MPC · JPL
303631	2005 JK_{86}	—	May 8, 2005	Mount Lemmon	Mount Lemmon Survey	·	3.0 km	MPC · JPL
303632	2005 JD_{90}	—	May 11, 2005	Mount Lemmon	Mount Lemmon Survey	·	1.1 km	MPC · JPL
303633	2005 JZ_{92}	—	May 11, 2005	Palomar	NEAT	·	2.9 km	MPC · JPL
303634	2005 JL_{95}	—	May 8, 2005	Mount Lemmon	Mount Lemmon Survey	·	1.4 km	MPC · JPL
303635	2005 JO_{100}	—	May 9, 2005	Kitt Peak	Spacewatch	WIT	1.3 km	MPC · JPL
303636	2005 JR_{105}	—	May 11, 2005	Mount Lemmon	Mount Lemmon Survey	AGN	1.7 km	MPC · JPL
303637	2005 JX_{133}	—	May 14, 2005	Kitt Peak	Spacewatch	HOF	3.3 km	MPC · JPL
303638	2005 JZ_{139}	—	May 14, 2005	Kitt Peak	Spacewatch	·	2.4 km	MPC · JPL
303639	2005 JM_{142}	—	May 15, 2005	Palomar	NEAT	·	1.8 km	MPC · JPL
303640	2005 JC_{145}	—	May 15, 2005	Mount Lemmon	Mount Lemmon Survey	·	3.5 km	MPC · JPL
303641	2005 JN_{147}	—	May 15, 2005	Palomar	NEAT	·	6.2 km	MPC · JPL
303642	2005 JW_{159}	—	May 7, 2005	Mount Lemmon	Mount Lemmon Survey	AGN	1.4 km	MPC · JPL
303643	2005 JM_{161}	—	May 8, 2005	Kitt Peak	Spacewatch	·	2.6 km	MPC · JPL
303644	2005 JQ_{167}	—	May 12, 2005	Palomar	NEAT	·	1.6 km	MPC · JPL
303645	2005 JW_{176}	—	May 8, 2005	Kitt Peak	Spacewatch	·	2.0 km	MPC · JPL
303646	2005 KQ_{1}	—	May 16, 2005	Mount Lemmon	Mount Lemmon Survey	·	3.2 km	MPC · JPL
303647	2005 KL_{2}	—	May 16, 2005	Mount Lemmon	Mount Lemmon Survey	·	1.5 km	MPC · JPL
303648 Mikszáth	2005 KC_{9}	Mikszáth	May 27, 2005	Piszkéstető	K. Sárneczky	H	670 m	MPC · JPL
303649	2005 KP_{11}	—	May 29, 2005	Siding Spring	SSS	H	720 m	MPC · JPL
303650	2005 LO_{2}	—	June 2, 2005	Catalina	CSS	·	3.3 km	MPC · JPL
303651	2005 LV_{13}	—	June 4, 2005	Kitt Peak	Spacewatch	(5)	1.9 km	MPC · JPL
303652	2005 LY_{17}	—	June 6, 2005	Kitt Peak	Spacewatch	·	1.7 km	MPC · JPL
303653	2005 LZ_{20}	—	June 5, 2005	Kitt Peak	Spacewatch	·	2.2 km	MPC · JPL
303654	2005 LX_{23}	—	June 11, 2005	Kitt Peak	Spacewatch	·	3.5 km	MPC · JPL
303655	2005 LC_{30}	—	June 12, 2005	Mount Lemmon	Mount Lemmon Survey	·	2.7 km	MPC · JPL
303656	2005 LP_{35}	—	June 10, 2005	Kitt Peak	Spacewatch	·	4.6 km	MPC · JPL
303657	2005 LW_{36}	—	June 13, 2005	Kitt Peak	Spacewatch	·	2.7 km	MPC · JPL
303658	2005 LV_{37}	—	June 11, 2005	Kitt Peak	Spacewatch	·	1.6 km	MPC · JPL
303659	2005 LO_{38}	—	June 11, 2005	Kitt Peak	Spacewatch	·	1.7 km	MPC · JPL
303660	2005 LZ_{44}	—	June 13, 2005	Kitt Peak	Spacewatch	·	3.3 km	MPC · JPL
303661	2005 LF_{49}	—	June 10, 2005	Kitt Peak	Spacewatch	·	2.3 km	MPC · JPL
303662	2005 LV_{52}	—	June 5, 2005	Kitt Peak	Spacewatch	·	2.8 km	MPC · JPL
303663	2005 MN_{2}	—	June 17, 2005	Mount Lemmon	Mount Lemmon Survey	·	2.4 km	MPC · JPL
303664	2005 MY_{11}	—	June 28, 2005	Kitt Peak	Spacewatch	·	2.9 km	MPC · JPL
303665	2005 ML_{14}	—	June 28, 2005	Palomar	NEAT	·	3.7 km	MPC · JPL
303666	2005 MB_{15}	—	June 29, 2005	Palomar	NEAT	·	2.9 km	MPC · JPL
303667	2005 MA_{18}	—	June 27, 2005	Kitt Peak	Spacewatch	EOS	2.3 km	MPC · JPL
303668	2005 MH_{34}	—	June 29, 2005	Palomar	NEAT	·	2.3 km	MPC · JPL
303669	2005 MD_{36}	—	June 30, 2005	Kitt Peak	Spacewatch	·	2.2 km	MPC · JPL
303670	2005 MU_{37}	—	June 30, 2005	Kitt Peak	Spacewatch	·	2.4 km	MPC · JPL
303671	2005 MS_{38}	—	June 30, 2005	Kitt Peak	Spacewatch	THM	2.2 km	MPC · JPL
303672	2005 MO_{40}	—	June 30, 2005	Kitt Peak	Spacewatch	·	2.8 km	MPC · JPL
303673	2005 MV_{40}	—	June 30, 2005	Kitt Peak	Spacewatch	TEL	1.6 km	MPC · JPL
303674	2005 MV_{41}	—	June 30, 2005	Kitt Peak	Spacewatch	·	2.4 km	MPC · JPL
303675	2005 MA_{47}	—	June 28, 2005	Palomar	NEAT	·	3.7 km	MPC · JPL
303676	2005 MW_{50}	—	June 30, 2005	Kitt Peak	Spacewatch	·	2.8 km	MPC · JPL
303677	2005 MH_{53}	—	June 17, 2005	Mount Lemmon	Mount Lemmon Survey	·	2.6 km	MPC · JPL
303678	2005 MH_{54}	—	June 30, 2005	Kitt Peak	Spacewatch	·	4.0 km	MPC · JPL
303679	2005 NA_{5}	—	July 3, 2005	Mount Lemmon	Mount Lemmon Survey	·	1.9 km	MPC · JPL
303680	2005 NP_{6}	—	July 4, 2005	Mount Lemmon	Mount Lemmon Survey	·	2.4 km	MPC · JPL
303681	2005 NL_{18}	—	July 4, 2005	Mount Lemmon	Mount Lemmon Survey	·	2.2 km	MPC · JPL
303682	2005 NG_{28}	—	July 5, 2005	Palomar	NEAT	EOS	2.6 km	MPC · JPL
303683	2005 NA_{30}	—	July 4, 2005	Kitt Peak	Spacewatch	·	2.9 km	MPC · JPL
303684	2005 NO_{37}	—	July 6, 2005	Kitt Peak	Spacewatch	·	2.9 km	MPC · JPL
303685	2005 NH_{44}	—	July 9, 2005	Kitt Peak	Spacewatch	EOS	2.6 km	MPC · JPL
303686	2005 NN_{60}	—	July 9, 2005	Catalina	CSS	·	4.4 km	MPC · JPL
303687	2005 NN_{64}	—	July 1, 2005	Kitt Peak	Spacewatch	·	2.8 km	MPC · JPL
303688	2005 NY_{65}	—	July 1, 2005	Kitt Peak	Spacewatch	EOS	2.5 km	MPC · JPL
303689	2005 NJ_{67}	—	July 2, 2005	Catalina	CSS	·	4.5 km	MPC · JPL
303690	2005 NO_{74}	—	July 9, 2005	Kitt Peak	Spacewatch	(16286)	2.4 km	MPC · JPL
303691	2005 NA_{77}	—	July 10, 2005	Kitt Peak	Spacewatch	·	3.6 km	MPC · JPL
303692	2005 NH_{77}	—	July 10, 2005	Kitt Peak	Spacewatch	EOS	2.1 km	MPC · JPL
303693	2005 NT_{80}	—	July 12, 2005	Bergisch Gladbach	W. Bickel	·	3.1 km	MPC · JPL
303694	2005 NG_{111}	—	July 7, 2005	Mauna Kea	Veillet, C.	·	2.1 km	MPC · JPL
303695	2005 OL_{8}	—	July 27, 2005	Palomar	NEAT	EOS	2.8 km	MPC · JPL
303696	2005 OH_{12}	—	July 29, 2005	Palomar	NEAT	·	3.6 km	MPC · JPL
303697	2005 OJ_{16}	—	July 29, 2005	Palomar	NEAT	·	2.5 km	MPC · JPL
303698	2005 OP_{18}	—	July 30, 2005	Palomar	NEAT	·	3.1 km	MPC · JPL
303699	2005 OX_{22}	—	July 29, 2005	Palomar	NEAT	THM	2.5 km	MPC · JPL
303700	2005 OJ_{24}	—	July 30, 2005	Palomar	NEAT	·	2.2 km	MPC · JPL

== 303701–303800 ==
back to top

Designation			Discovery			Properties		Ref
Permanent	Provisional	Named after	Date	Site	Discoverer(s)	Category	Diam.	Ref
303701	2005 OX_{26}	—	July 29, 2005	Siding Spring	SSS	·	3.9 km	MPC · JPL
303702	2005 OE_{27}	—	July 30, 2005	Palomar	NEAT	·	2.7 km	MPC · JPL
303703	2005 OO_{27}	—	July 31, 2005	Palomar	NEAT	·	2.5 km	MPC · JPL
303704	2005 OS_{28}	—	July 31, 2005	Palomar	NEAT	EOS	2.2 km	MPC · JPL
303705	2005 OX_{28}	—	July 27, 2005	Palomar	NEAT	EOS	2.3 km	MPC · JPL
303706	2005 OZ_{30}	—	July 29, 2005	Palomar	NEAT	·	3.1 km	MPC · JPL
303707	2005 PX	—	August 1, 2005	Siding Spring	SSS	HYG	3.0 km	MPC · JPL
303708	2005 PK_{1}	—	August 1, 2005	Siding Spring	SSS	·	3.2 km	MPC · JPL
303709	2005 PL_{9}	—	August 4, 2005	Palomar	NEAT	·	2.3 km	MPC · JPL
303710 Velpeau	2005 PD_{17}	Velpeau	August 9, 2005	Saint-Sulpice	B. Christophe	·	3.4 km	MPC · JPL
303711	2005 PW_{17}	—	August 11, 2005	Pla D'Arguines	R. Ferrando, Ferrando, M.	·	1.8 km	MPC · JPL
303712	2005 PR_{21}	—	August 9, 2005	Cerro Tololo	Cerro Tololo	cubewano (cold) · moon	184 km	MPC · JPL
303713	2005 PV_{21}	—	August 5, 2005	Palomar	NEAT	·	2.3 km	MPC · JPL
303714	2005 QT_{2}	—	August 24, 2005	Palomar	NEAT	·	3.7 km	MPC · JPL
303715	2005 QY_{2}	—	August 24, 2005	Palomar	NEAT	·	3.1 km	MPC · JPL
303716	2005 QU_{3}	—	August 24, 2005	Palomar	NEAT	EOS	2.6 km	MPC · JPL
303717	2005 QV_{8}	—	August 25, 2005	Palomar	NEAT	·	3.5 km	MPC · JPL
303718	2005 QL_{12}	—	August 24, 2005	Palomar	NEAT	·	3.0 km	MPC · JPL
303719	2005 QM_{13}	—	August 24, 2005	Palomar	NEAT	TIR	3.9 km	MPC · JPL
303720	2005 QA_{15}	—	August 25, 2005	Palomar	NEAT	·	3.6 km	MPC · JPL
303721	2005 QW_{15}	—	August 25, 2005	Palomar	NEAT	EOS	2.3 km	MPC · JPL
303722	2005 QO_{16}	—	August 25, 2005	Palomar	NEAT	·	4.4 km	MPC · JPL
303723	2005 QX_{16}	—	August 25, 2005	Palomar	NEAT	·	3.5 km	MPC · JPL
303724	2005 QB_{24}	—	August 27, 2005	Kitt Peak	Spacewatch	·	3.4 km	MPC · JPL
303725	2005 QK_{34}	—	August 25, 2005	Palomar	NEAT	·	4.5 km	MPC · JPL
303726	2005 QE_{35}	—	August 25, 2005	Palomar	NEAT	·	5.3 km	MPC · JPL
303727	2005 QO_{38}	—	August 25, 2005	Campo Imperatore	CINEOS	·	3.8 km	MPC · JPL
303728	2005 QY_{38}	—	August 25, 2005	Campo Imperatore	CINEOS	EOS	5.2 km	MPC · JPL
303729	2005 QM_{43}	—	August 26, 2005	Palomar	NEAT	·	3.6 km	MPC · JPL
303730	2005 QO_{50}	—	August 26, 2005	Palomar	NEAT	·	4.2 km	MPC · JPL
303731	2005 QD_{54}	—	August 28, 2005	Kitt Peak	Spacewatch	·	3.2 km	MPC · JPL
303732	2005 QF_{54}	—	August 28, 2005	Kitt Peak	Spacewatch	·	4.0 km	MPC · JPL
303733	2005 QV_{57}	—	August 24, 2005	Palomar	NEAT	·	4.2 km	MPC · JPL
303734	2005 QP_{62}	—	August 26, 2005	Palomar	NEAT	·	3.1 km	MPC · JPL
303735	2005 QV_{64}	—	August 26, 2005	Palomar	NEAT	EOS	2.6 km	MPC · JPL
303736	2005 QH_{65}	—	August 26, 2005	Palomar	NEAT	·	3.9 km	MPC · JPL
303737	2005 QR_{66}	—	August 27, 2005	Anderson Mesa	LONEOS	·	3.5 km	MPC · JPL
303738	2005 QJ_{68}	—	August 28, 2005	Siding Spring	SSS	·	3.3 km	MPC · JPL
303739	2005 QX_{68}	—	August 28, 2005	Siding Spring	SSS	·	3.2 km	MPC · JPL
303740	2005 QQ_{79}	—	August 26, 2005	Haleakala	NEAT	·	5.3 km	MPC · JPL
303741	2005 QB_{83}	—	August 29, 2005	Anderson Mesa	LONEOS	·	3.3 km	MPC · JPL
303742	2005 QW_{86}	—	August 30, 2005	Drebach	Drebach	·	3.5 km	MPC · JPL
303743	2005 QZ_{86}	—	August 29, 2005	Goodricke-Pigott	R. A. Tucker	·	3.9 km	MPC · JPL
303744	2005 QH_{89}	—	August 31, 2005	Palomar	NEAT	H	840 m	MPC · JPL
303745	2005 QB_{92}	—	August 26, 2005	Anderson Mesa	LONEOS	·	3.5 km	MPC · JPL
303746	2005 QD_{97}	—	August 27, 2005	Palomar	NEAT	·	4.3 km	MPC · JPL
303747	2005 QH_{97}	—	August 27, 2005	Palomar	NEAT	·	3.8 km	MPC · JPL
303748	2005 QG_{101}	—	August 27, 2005	Palomar	NEAT	·	3.3 km	MPC · JPL
303749	2005 QT_{103}	—	August 27, 2005	Palomar	NEAT	·	3.6 km	MPC · JPL
303750	2005 QH_{105}	—	August 27, 2005	Palomar	NEAT	·	2.9 km	MPC · JPL
303751	2005 QV_{105}	—	August 27, 2005	Palomar	NEAT	HYG	3.4 km	MPC · JPL
303752	2005 QE_{119}	—	August 28, 2005	Kitt Peak	Spacewatch	·	1.7 km	MPC · JPL
303753	2005 QG_{123}	—	August 28, 2005	Kitt Peak	Spacewatch	·	2.5 km	MPC · JPL
303754	2005 QJ_{125}	—	August 28, 2005	Kitt Peak	Spacewatch	THM	2.3 km	MPC · JPL
303755	2005 QP_{126}	—	August 28, 2005	Kitt Peak	Spacewatch	THM	2.7 km	MPC · JPL
303756	2005 QE_{127}	—	August 28, 2005	Kitt Peak	Spacewatch	(31811)	3.0 km	MPC · JPL
303757	2005 QF_{127}	—	August 28, 2005	Kitt Peak	Spacewatch	·	2.9 km	MPC · JPL
303758	2005 QU_{129}	—	August 28, 2005	Kitt Peak	Spacewatch	·	4.7 km	MPC · JPL
303759	2005 QG_{135}	—	August 28, 2005	Kitt Peak	Spacewatch	·	2.4 km	MPC · JPL
303760	2005 QS_{140}	—	August 29, 2005	Kitt Peak	Spacewatch	EOS	2.0 km	MPC · JPL
303761	2005 QH_{148}	—	August 30, 2005	Anderson Mesa	LONEOS	·	3.3 km	MPC · JPL
303762	2005 QQ_{148}	—	August 30, 2005	Anderson Mesa	LONEOS	T_{j} (2.96)	4.5 km	MPC · JPL
303763	2005 QD_{158}	—	August 26, 2005	Palomar	NEAT	·	2.9 km	MPC · JPL
303764	2005 QS_{160}	—	August 28, 2005	Kitt Peak	Spacewatch	·	3.9 km	MPC · JPL
303765	2005 QP_{163}	—	August 30, 2005	Kitt Peak	Spacewatch	·	3.6 km	MPC · JPL
303766	2005 QG_{168}	—	August 29, 2005	Palomar	NEAT	·	3.7 km	MPC · JPL
303767	2005 QJ_{169}	—	August 29, 2005	Palomar	NEAT	VER	4.2 km	MPC · JPL
303768	2005 QL_{171}	—	August 29, 2005	Palomar	NEAT	VER	3.2 km	MPC · JPL
303769	2005 QD_{172}	—	August 29, 2005	Palomar	NEAT	·	4.2 km	MPC · JPL
303770	2005 QR_{172}	—	August 29, 2005	Palomar	NEAT	·	3.8 km	MPC · JPL
303771	2005 QB_{173}	—	August 29, 2005	Palomar	NEAT	VER	4.4 km	MPC · JPL
303772	2005 QS_{173}	—	August 31, 2005	Anderson Mesa	LONEOS	LIX	4.1 km	MPC · JPL
303773	2005 QK_{174}	—	August 31, 2005	Anderson Mesa	LONEOS	EOS	2.7 km	MPC · JPL
303774	2005 QG_{180}	—	August 27, 2005	Palomar	NEAT	·	4.1 km	MPC · JPL
303775	2005 QU_{182}	—	August 30, 2005	Palomar	Palomar	SDO	416 km	MPC · JPL
303776	2005 QM_{183}	—	August 30, 2005	Palomar	NEAT	·	2.4 km	MPC · JPL
303777	2005 QW_{187}	—	August 27, 2005	Palomar	NEAT	·	6.2 km	MPC · JPL
303778	2005 QR_{188}	—	August 27, 2005	Palomar	NEAT	·	2.7 km	MPC · JPL
303779	2005 QU_{189}	—	August 29, 2005	Kitt Peak	Spacewatch	·	2.8 km	MPC · JPL
303780	2005 QU_{190}	—	August 26, 2005	Palomar	NEAT	HYG	3.7 km	MPC · JPL
303781	2005 RP	—	September 1, 2005	St. Véran	St. Veran	HYG	3.0 km	MPC · JPL
303782	2005 RU_{12}	—	September 1, 2005	Kitt Peak	Spacewatch	·	2.7 km	MPC · JPL
303783	2005 RT_{20}	—	September 1, 2005	Palomar	NEAT	·	5.1 km	MPC · JPL
303784	2005 RU_{22}	—	September 6, 2005	Anderson Mesa	LONEOS	·	5.3 km	MPC · JPL
303785	2005 RM_{33}	—	September 14, 2005	Siding Spring	SSS	·	4.9 km	MPC · JPL
303786	2005 RP_{34}	—	August 30, 2005	Palomar	NEAT	·	2.9 km	MPC · JPL
303787	2005 RB_{41}	—	September 12, 2005	Kitt Peak	Spacewatch	VER	3.7 km	MPC · JPL
303788	2005 RS_{42}	—	September 13, 2005	Kitt Peak	Spacewatch	·	2.9 km	MPC · JPL
303789	2005 RA_{44}	—	September 13, 2005	Socorro	LINEAR	·	4.8 km	MPC · JPL
303790	2005 RZ_{47}	—	September 14, 2005	Apache Point	A. C. Becker	·	3.9 km	MPC · JPL
303791	2005 SX_{3}	—	September 24, 2005	Kitt Peak	Spacewatch	·	2.7 km	MPC · JPL
303792	2005 SG_{9}	—	September 25, 2005	Catalina	CSS	·	4.8 km	MPC · JPL
303793	2005 SQ_{24}	—	September 24, 2005	Anderson Mesa	LONEOS	·	6.4 km	MPC · JPL
303794	2005 SW_{24}	—	September 24, 2005	Anderson Mesa	LONEOS	THB	3.6 km	MPC · JPL
303795	2005 SR_{28}	—	September 23, 2005	Kitt Peak	Spacewatch	VER	3.9 km	MPC · JPL
303796	2005 SS_{28}	—	September 23, 2005	Kitt Peak	Spacewatch	VER	3.0 km	MPC · JPL
303797	2005 SL_{29}	—	September 23, 2005	Kitt Peak	Spacewatch	HYG	3.3 km	MPC · JPL
303798	2005 SJ_{30}	—	September 23, 2005	Kitt Peak	Spacewatch	·	3.6 km	MPC · JPL
303799	2005 SO_{39}	—	September 24, 2005	Kitt Peak	Spacewatch	TIR	4.3 km	MPC · JPL
303800	2005 SC_{40}	—	September 24, 2005	Kitt Peak	Spacewatch	HYG	3.3 km	MPC · JPL

== 303801–303900 ==
back to top

Designation			Discovery			Properties		Ref
Permanent	Provisional	Named after	Date	Site	Discoverer(s)	Category	Diam.	Ref
303801	2005 SU_{41}	—	September 24, 2005	Kitt Peak	Spacewatch	·	3.3 km	MPC · JPL
303802	2005 ST_{42}	—	September 24, 2005	Kitt Peak	Spacewatch	URS	4.6 km	MPC · JPL
303803	2005 SP_{44}	—	September 24, 2005	Kitt Peak	Spacewatch	·	3.4 km	MPC · JPL
303804	2005 SD_{45}	—	September 24, 2005	Kitt Peak	Spacewatch	·	3.1 km	MPC · JPL
303805	2005 SB_{50}	—	September 24, 2005	Kitt Peak	Spacewatch	·	2.6 km	MPC · JPL
303806	2005 SY_{50}	—	September 24, 2005	Kitt Peak	Spacewatch	·	3.9 km	MPC · JPL
303807	2005 SU_{58}	—	September 26, 2005	Kitt Peak	Spacewatch	·	5.1 km	MPC · JPL
303808	2005 SR_{60}	—	September 26, 2005	Kitt Peak	Spacewatch	T_{j} (2.93)	4.7 km	MPC · JPL
303809	2005 SW_{64}	—	September 26, 2005	Palomar	NEAT	VER	3.4 km	MPC · JPL
303810	2005 SE_{66}	—	September 26, 2005	Palomar	NEAT	·	5.5 km	MPC · JPL
303811	2005 SS_{67}	—	September 27, 2005	Kitt Peak	Spacewatch	·	3.7 km	MPC · JPL
303812	2005 SY_{74}	—	September 24, 2005	Kitt Peak	Spacewatch	·	3.1 km	MPC · JPL
303813	2005 SD_{77}	—	September 24, 2005	Kitt Peak	Spacewatch	·	3.0 km	MPC · JPL
303814	2005 SH_{77}	—	September 24, 2005	Kitt Peak	Spacewatch	THM	2.3 km	MPC · JPL
303815	2005 SE_{81}	—	September 24, 2005	Kitt Peak	Spacewatch	·	2.9 km	MPC · JPL
303816	2005 SQ_{81}	—	September 24, 2005	Kitt Peak	Spacewatch	·	3.2 km	MPC · JPL
303817	2005 SS_{82}	—	September 24, 2005	Kitt Peak	Spacewatch	·	3.8 km	MPC · JPL
303818	2005 SS_{89}	—	September 24, 2005	Kitt Peak	Spacewatch	·	3.2 km	MPC · JPL
303819	2005 SS_{94}	—	September 25, 2005	Palomar	NEAT	·	5.1 km	MPC · JPL
303820	2005 SX_{100}	—	September 25, 2005	Kitt Peak	Spacewatch	THB	3.6 km	MPC · JPL
303821	2005 SQ_{103}	—	September 25, 2005	Catalina	CSS	·	3.6 km	MPC · JPL
303822	2005 ST_{109}	—	September 26, 2005	Kitt Peak	Spacewatch	(31811)	4.3 km	MPC · JPL
303823	2005 SJ_{111}	—	September 26, 2005	Palomar	NEAT	·	3.4 km	MPC · JPL
303824	2005 SG_{112}	—	September 26, 2005	Palomar	NEAT	·	4.2 km	MPC · JPL
303825	2005 SX_{113}	—	September 27, 2005	Kitt Peak	Spacewatch	·	4.0 km	MPC · JPL
303826	2005 SB_{118}	—	September 28, 2005	Palomar	NEAT	·	4.7 km	MPC · JPL
303827	2005 SU_{119}	—	September 29, 2005	Catalina	CSS	·	4.6 km	MPC · JPL
303828	2005 SX_{120}	—	September 29, 2005	Kitt Peak	Spacewatch	·	3.1 km	MPC · JPL
303829	2005 SO_{123}	—	September 29, 2005	Anderson Mesa	LONEOS	·	2.9 km	MPC · JPL
303830	2005 SY_{123}	—	September 29, 2005	Anderson Mesa	LONEOS	CYB	5.2 km	MPC · JPL
303831	2005 SJ_{127}	—	September 29, 2005	Mount Lemmon	Mount Lemmon Survey	·	3.1 km	MPC · JPL
303832	2005 SB_{130}	—	September 29, 2005	Anderson Mesa	LONEOS	·	4.0 km	MPC · JPL
303833	2005 ST_{139}	—	September 25, 2005	Kitt Peak	Spacewatch	·	5.1 km	MPC · JPL
303834	2005 SY_{145}	—	September 25, 2005	Kitt Peak	Spacewatch	·	4.2 km	MPC · JPL
303835	2005 SM_{147}	—	September 25, 2005	Kitt Peak	Spacewatch	HYG	3.0 km	MPC · JPL
303836	2005 SZ_{156}	—	September 26, 2005	Kitt Peak	Spacewatch	EOS	2.3 km	MPC · JPL
303837	2005 SF_{162}	—	September 27, 2005	Kitt Peak	Spacewatch	·	3.7 km	MPC · JPL
303838	2005 SS_{162}	—	September 27, 2005	Kitt Peak	Spacewatch	·	3.4 km	MPC · JPL
303839	2005 SO_{164}	—	September 27, 2005	Palomar	NEAT	·	5.2 km	MPC · JPL
303840	2005 ST_{168}	—	September 29, 2005	Kitt Peak	Spacewatch	·	2.7 km	MPC · JPL
303841	2005 SS_{170}	—	September 29, 2005	Anderson Mesa	LONEOS	·	5.5 km	MPC · JPL
303842	2005 SJ_{171}	—	September 29, 2005	Kitt Peak	Spacewatch	·	3.5 km	MPC · JPL
303843	2005 SO_{172}	—	September 29, 2005	Kitt Peak	Spacewatch	THM	2.6 km	MPC · JPL
303844	2005 SM_{175}	—	September 29, 2005	Kitt Peak	Spacewatch	·	4.8 km	MPC · JPL
303845	2005 SV_{176}	—	September 29, 2005	Kitt Peak	Spacewatch	·	3.3 km	MPC · JPL
303846	2005 SW_{182}	—	September 29, 2005	Kitt Peak	Spacewatch	EOS	4.6 km	MPC · JPL
303847	2005 SH_{189}	—	September 29, 2005	Mount Lemmon	Mount Lemmon Survey	THM	2.9 km	MPC · JPL
303848	2005 SS_{189}	—	September 29, 2005	Mount Lemmon	Mount Lemmon Survey	·	3.7 km	MPC · JPL
303849	2005 SH_{192}	—	September 29, 2005	Mount Lemmon	Mount Lemmon Survey	(3460)	2.7 km	MPC · JPL
303850	2005 SR_{193}	—	September 29, 2005	Kitt Peak	Spacewatch	CYB	4.8 km	MPC · JPL
303851	2005 SP_{196}	—	September 30, 2005	Kitt Peak	Spacewatch	·	3.6 km	MPC · JPL
303852	2005 SQ_{196}	—	September 30, 2005	Kitt Peak	Spacewatch	·	2.9 km	MPC · JPL
303853	2005 SN_{200}	—	September 30, 2005	Kitt Peak	Spacewatch	·	2.6 km	MPC · JPL
303854	2005 SS_{202}	—	September 30, 2005	Mount Lemmon	Mount Lemmon Survey	·	2.8 km	MPC · JPL
303855	2005 SC_{205}	—	September 30, 2005	Anderson Mesa	LONEOS	·	4.3 km	MPC · JPL
303856	2005 SA_{210}	—	September 30, 2005	Palomar	NEAT	(1298)	3.9 km	MPC · JPL
303857	2005 SC_{226}	—	September 30, 2005	Kitt Peak	Spacewatch	·	4.5 km	MPC · JPL
303858	2005 SJ_{228}	—	September 30, 2005	Mount Lemmon	Mount Lemmon Survey	·	2.9 km	MPC · JPL
303859	2005 SZ_{231}	—	September 30, 2005	Anderson Mesa	LONEOS	·	4.0 km	MPC · JPL
303860	2005 SQ_{240}	—	September 30, 2005	Kitt Peak	Spacewatch	·	3.9 km	MPC · JPL
303861	2005 SQ_{250}	—	September 23, 2005	Catalina	CSS	·	3.8 km	MPC · JPL
303862	2005 SE_{256}	—	September 22, 2005	Palomar	NEAT	·	4.3 km	MPC · JPL
303863	2005 SF_{257}	—	September 22, 2005	Palomar	NEAT	EOS	2.2 km	MPC · JPL
303864	2005 SU_{268}	—	September 25, 2005	Palomar	NEAT	EUP	3.8 km	MPC · JPL
303865	2005 SZ_{268}	—	September 25, 2005	Kitt Peak	Spacewatch	·	5.5 km	MPC · JPL
303866	2005 SA_{272}	—	September 27, 2005	Kitt Peak	Spacewatch	·	4.9 km	MPC · JPL
303867	2005 SZ_{285}	—	September 25, 2005	Apache Point	A. C. Becker	EOS	2.0 km	MPC · JPL
303868	2005 SJ_{286}	—	September 26, 2005	Apache Point	A. C. Becker	THM	2.4 km	MPC · JPL
303869	2005 SF_{291}	—	September 25, 2005	Palomar	NEAT	·	4.1 km	MPC · JPL
303870	2005 SG_{293}	—	September 22, 2005	Palomar	NEAT	HYG	3.3 km	MPC · JPL
303871	2005 TE_{7}	—	October 1, 2005	Catalina	CSS	·	4.6 km	MPC · JPL
303872	2005 TB_{10}	—	October 2, 2005	Palomar	NEAT	·	4.6 km	MPC · JPL
303873	2005 TC_{12}	—	October 1, 2005	Kitt Peak	Spacewatch	ELF	4.4 km	MPC · JPL
303874	2005 TC_{14}	—	October 1, 2005	Catalina	CSS	·	3.8 km	MPC · JPL
303875	2005 TG_{14}	—	October 1, 2005	Catalina	CSS	EOS	2.6 km	MPC · JPL
303876	2005 TF_{19}	—	October 1, 2005	Mount Lemmon	Mount Lemmon Survey	HYG	3.1 km	MPC · JPL
303877	2005 TQ_{19}	—	October 1, 2005	Mount Lemmon	Mount Lemmon Survey	·	3.0 km	MPC · JPL
303878	2005 TW_{34}	—	October 1, 2005	Kitt Peak	Spacewatch	·	2.9 km	MPC · JPL
303879	2005 TV_{41}	—	October 3, 2005	Catalina	CSS	·	3.7 km	MPC · JPL
303880	2005 TM_{42}	—	October 3, 2005	Catalina	CSS	·	3.5 km	MPC · JPL
303881	2005 TL_{60}	—	October 3, 2005	Kitt Peak	Spacewatch	·	3.2 km	MPC · JPL
303882	2005 TZ_{60}	—	October 3, 2005	Kitt Peak	Spacewatch	·	3.5 km	MPC · JPL
303883	2005 TB_{69}	—	October 6, 2005	Mount Lemmon	Mount Lemmon Survey	·	3.1 km	MPC · JPL
303884	2005 TY_{69}	—	October 6, 2005	Kitt Peak	Spacewatch	·	4.5 km	MPC · JPL
303885	2005 TG_{71}	—	October 7, 2005	Mount Lemmon	Mount Lemmon Survey	·	4.8 km	MPC · JPL
303886	2005 TJ_{71}	—	October 7, 2005	Mount Lemmon	Mount Lemmon Survey	·	4.0 km	MPC · JPL
303887	2005 TV_{79}	—	October 1, 2005	Catalina	CSS	·	4.1 km	MPC · JPL
303888	2005 TT_{87}	—	October 5, 2005	Kitt Peak	Spacewatch	EOS	2.4 km	MPC · JPL
303889	2005 TK_{89}	—	October 5, 2005	Mount Lemmon	Mount Lemmon Survey	(1118)	5.6 km	MPC · JPL
303890	2005 TL_{90}	—	October 6, 2005	Kitt Peak	Spacewatch	EOS	2.0 km	MPC · JPL
303891	2005 TB_{96}	—	October 6, 2005	Mount Lemmon	Mount Lemmon Survey	·	3.0 km	MPC · JPL
303892	2005 TY_{98}	—	October 7, 2005	Kitt Peak	Spacewatch	·	3.7 km	MPC · JPL
303893	2005 TP_{100}	—	October 7, 2005	Mount Lemmon	Mount Lemmon Survey	·	3.4 km	MPC · JPL
303894	2005 TB_{102}	—	October 7, 2005	Mount Lemmon	Mount Lemmon Survey	·	3.5 km	MPC · JPL
303895	2005 TT_{103}	—	October 8, 2005	Socorro	LINEAR	VER	4.1 km	MPC · JPL
303896	2005 TD_{111}	—	October 7, 2005	Kitt Peak	Spacewatch	·	3.3 km	MPC · JPL
303897	2005 TH_{111}	—	October 7, 2005	Kitt Peak	Spacewatch	HYG	2.9 km	MPC · JPL
303898	2005 TY_{113}	—	October 7, 2005	Kitt Peak	Spacewatch	T_{j} (2.99) · EUP	5.7 km	MPC · JPL
303899	2005 TJ_{121}	—	October 7, 2005	Kitt Peak	Spacewatch	VER	3.2 km	MPC · JPL
303900	2005 TA_{128}	—	October 7, 2005	Kitt Peak	Spacewatch	·	2.8 km	MPC · JPL

== 303901–304000 ==
back to top

Designation			Discovery			Properties		Ref
Permanent	Provisional	Named after	Date	Site	Discoverer(s)	Category	Diam.	Ref
303901	2005 TY_{137}	—	October 7, 2005	Catalina	CSS	·	3.3 km	MPC · JPL
303902	2005 TJ_{142}	—	October 8, 2005	Kitt Peak	Spacewatch	·	3.3 km	MPC · JPL
303903	2005 TN_{144}	—	October 8, 2005	Kitt Peak	Spacewatch	·	4.1 km	MPC · JPL
303904	2005 TF_{151}	—	October 8, 2005	Kitt Peak	Spacewatch	·	2.8 km	MPC · JPL
303905	2005 TV_{152}	—	October 5, 2005	Catalina	CSS	·	3.6 km	MPC · JPL
303906	2005 TY_{156}	—	October 9, 2005	Kitt Peak	Spacewatch	·	3.1 km	MPC · JPL
303907	2005 TW_{162}	—	October 9, 2005	Kitt Peak	Spacewatch	·	3.9 km	MPC · JPL
303908	2005 TL_{167}	—	October 9, 2005	Kitt Peak	Spacewatch	·	3.2 km	MPC · JPL
303909 Tomknops	2005 TK_{170}	Tomknops	October 11, 2005	Uccle	P. De Cat	EOS	2.5 km	MPC · JPL
303910	2005 TL_{175}	—	October 1, 2005	Kitt Peak	Spacewatch	·	3.4 km	MPC · JPL
303911	2005 UB_{22}	—	October 23, 2005	Kitt Peak	Spacewatch	·	4.8 km	MPC · JPL
303912	2005 UC_{22}	—	October 23, 2005	Kitt Peak	Spacewatch	CYB	2.6 km	MPC · JPL
303913	2005 UL_{25}	—	October 23, 2005	Kitt Peak	Spacewatch	·	4.6 km	MPC · JPL
303914	2005 UJ_{72}	—	October 23, 2005	Catalina	CSS	·	4.5 km	MPC · JPL
303915	2005 UQ_{81}	—	October 21, 2005	Palomar	NEAT	·	4.3 km	MPC · JPL
303916	2005 UH_{122}	—	October 24, 2005	Kitt Peak	Spacewatch	·	740 m	MPC · JPL
303917	2005 UM_{124}	—	October 24, 2005	Kitt Peak	Spacewatch	·	3.6 km	MPC · JPL
303918	2005 UR_{193}	—	October 22, 2005	Kitt Peak	Spacewatch	THM	2.6 km	MPC · JPL
303919	2005 UO_{194}	—	October 22, 2005	Kitt Peak	Spacewatch	·	3.6 km	MPC · JPL
303920	2005 UK_{201}	—	October 25, 2005	Kitt Peak	Spacewatch	·	980 m	MPC · JPL
303921	2005 UY_{207}	—	October 27, 2005	Kitt Peak	Spacewatch	·	2.8 km	MPC · JPL
303922	2005 UM_{269}	—	October 28, 2005	Mount Lemmon	Mount Lemmon Survey	·	2.9 km	MPC · JPL
303923	2005 UY_{276}	—	October 24, 2005	Kitt Peak	Spacewatch	·	5.0 km	MPC · JPL
303924	2005 UG_{283}	—	October 26, 2005	Kitt Peak	Spacewatch	·	4.3 km	MPC · JPL
303925	2005 UW_{298}	—	October 26, 2005	Kitt Peak	Spacewatch	CYB	5.2 km	MPC · JPL
303926	2005 UX_{387}	—	October 26, 2005	Kitt Peak	Spacewatch	·	4.6 km	MPC · JPL
303927	2005 UV_{392}	—	October 30, 2005	Mount Lemmon	Mount Lemmon Survey	THM	2.6 km	MPC · JPL
303928	2005 UP_{439}	—	October 29, 2005	Catalina	CSS	·	5.7 km	MPC · JPL
303929	2005 UQ_{496}	—	October 27, 2005	Anderson Mesa	LONEOS	·	5.0 km	MPC · JPL
303930	2005 UZ_{503}	—	October 24, 2005	Mauna Kea	D. J. Tholen	·	1.3 km	MPC · JPL
303931	2005 UN_{516}	—	October 25, 2005	Apache Point	A. C. Becker	THM	1.9 km	MPC · JPL
303932	2005 UZ_{528}	—	October 22, 2005	Kitt Peak	Spacewatch	·	3.1 km	MPC · JPL
303933	2005 VQ	—	November 3, 2005	Catalina	CSS	APO	550 m	MPC · JPL
303934	2005 VF_{62}	—	November 1, 2005	Mount Lemmon	Mount Lemmon Survey	·	4.0 km	MPC · JPL
303935	2005 VV_{119}	—	November 4, 2005	Kitt Peak	Spacewatch	·	1.5 km	MPC · JPL
303936	2005 VY_{126}	—	November 1, 2005	Apache Point	A. C. Becker	HYG	3.4 km	MPC · JPL
303937	2005 VS_{128}	—	November 1, 2005	Apache Point	A. C. Becker	·	4.2 km	MPC · JPL
303938	2005 VS_{131}	—	November 1, 2005	Apache Point	A. C. Becker	·	3.3 km	MPC · JPL
303939	2005 WO_{23}	—	November 21, 2005	Kitt Peak	Spacewatch	CYB	3.7 km	MPC · JPL
303940	2005 WE_{40}	—	November 25, 2005	Mount Lemmon	Mount Lemmon Survey	·	870 m	MPC · JPL
303941	2005 WZ_{84}	—	November 26, 2005	Mount Lemmon	Mount Lemmon Survey	·	960 m	MPC · JPL
303942	2005 WF_{85}	—	November 28, 2005	Mount Lemmon	Mount Lemmon Survey	LUT	6.8 km	MPC · JPL
303943	2005 WL_{141}	—	November 28, 2005	Mount Lemmon	Mount Lemmon Survey	·	1.0 km	MPC · JPL
303944	2005 WY_{182}	—	November 26, 2005	Catalina	CSS	T_{j} (2.89)	5.1 km	MPC · JPL
303945	2005 WH_{204}	—	November 29, 2005	Mount Lemmon	Mount Lemmon Survey	·	790 m	MPC · JPL
303946	2005 XR_{28}	—	December 1, 2005	Socorro	LINEAR	·	1.4 km	MPC · JPL
303947	2005 XZ_{85}	—	December 4, 2005	Kitt Peak	Spacewatch	·	820 m	MPC · JPL
303948	2005 XZ_{109}	—	December 1, 2005	Kitt Peak	M. W. Buie	·	1.4 km	MPC · JPL
303949	2005 XT_{114}	—	December 6, 2005	Kitt Peak	Spacewatch	·	950 m	MPC · JPL
303950	2005 YK_{18}	—	December 23, 2005	Kitt Peak	Spacewatch	·	1.3 km	MPC · JPL
303951	2005 YN_{21}	—	December 24, 2005	Kitt Peak	Spacewatch	·	910 m	MPC · JPL
303952	2005 YR_{40}	—	December 25, 2005	Kitt Peak	Spacewatch	·	700 m	MPC · JPL
303953	2005 YB_{52}	—	December 26, 2005	Mount Lemmon	Mount Lemmon Survey	·	780 m	MPC · JPL
303954	2005 YF_{54}	—	December 24, 2005	Kitt Peak	Spacewatch	·	880 m	MPC · JPL
303955	2005 YS_{66}	—	December 25, 2005	Mount Lemmon	Mount Lemmon Survey	·	670 m	MPC · JPL
303956	2005 YZ_{67}	—	December 26, 2005	Kitt Peak	Spacewatch	·	650 m	MPC · JPL
303957	2005 YD_{83}	—	December 24, 2005	Kitt Peak	Spacewatch	·	1.5 km	MPC · JPL
303958	2005 YB_{132}	—	December 25, 2005	Mount Lemmon	Mount Lemmon Survey	·	980 m	MPC · JPL
303959	2005 YW_{195}	—	December 24, 2005	Catalina	CSS	·	1.1 km	MPC · JPL
303960	2005 YF_{242}	—	December 30, 2005	Kitt Peak	Spacewatch	·	810 m	MPC · JPL
303961	2005 YN_{259}	—	December 24, 2005	Kitt Peak	Spacewatch	·	550 m	MPC · JPL
303962	2005 YD_{291}	—	December 25, 2005	Mount Lemmon	Mount Lemmon Survey	·	920 m	MPC · JPL
303963	2006 AR_{10}	—	January 4, 2006	Catalina	CSS	·	1.1 km	MPC · JPL
303964	2006 AJ_{16}	—	January 4, 2006	Catalina	CSS	·	5.5 km	MPC · JPL
303965	2006 AL_{18}	—	January 5, 2006	Mount Lemmon	Mount Lemmon Survey	·	890 m	MPC · JPL
303966	2006 AE_{40}	—	January 7, 2006	Mount Lemmon	Mount Lemmon Survey	·	860 m	MPC · JPL
303967	2006 AY_{47}	—	January 7, 2006	Mount Lemmon	Mount Lemmon Survey	·	800 m	MPC · JPL
303968	2006 AP_{63}	—	January 6, 2006	Anderson Mesa	LONEOS	·	1.2 km	MPC · JPL
303969	2006 AH_{80}	—	January 5, 2006	Mount Lemmon	Mount Lemmon Survey	·	770 m	MPC · JPL
303970	2006 AD_{88}	—	January 5, 2006	Mount Lemmon	Mount Lemmon Survey	·	760 m	MPC · JPL
303971	2006 AK_{102}	—	January 5, 2006	Mount Lemmon	Mount Lemmon Survey	·	1.7 km	MPC · JPL
303972	2006 BN_{5}	—	January 21, 2006	Anderson Mesa	LONEOS	·	900 m	MPC · JPL
303973	2006 BW_{10}	—	January 20, 2006	Kitt Peak	Spacewatch	NYS	1.5 km	MPC · JPL
303974	2006 BF_{22}	—	January 22, 2006	Mount Lemmon	Mount Lemmon Survey	·	1.6 km	MPC · JPL
303975	2006 BD_{45}	—	January 23, 2006	Mount Lemmon	Mount Lemmon Survey	V	740 m	MPC · JPL
303976	2006 BF_{45}	—	January 23, 2006	Mount Lemmon	Mount Lemmon Survey	·	1.1 km	MPC · JPL
303977	2006 BD_{47}	—	January 24, 2006	Socorro	LINEAR	·	940 m	MPC · JPL
303978	2006 BW_{67}	—	January 23, 2006	Kitt Peak	Spacewatch	·	780 m	MPC · JPL
303979	2006 BA_{73}	—	January 23, 2006	Kitt Peak	Spacewatch	·	2.6 km	MPC · JPL
303980	2006 BA_{74}	—	January 23, 2006	Kitt Peak	Spacewatch	·	2.1 km	MPC · JPL
303981	2006 BK_{80}	—	January 23, 2006	Kitt Peak	Spacewatch	·	1.6 km	MPC · JPL
303982	2006 BR_{91}	—	January 26, 2006	Kitt Peak	Spacewatch	·	640 m	MPC · JPL
303983	2006 BB_{93}	—	January 26, 2006	Kitt Peak	Spacewatch	·	1.0 km	MPC · JPL
303984	2006 BL_{99}	—	January 25, 2006	Kitt Peak	Spacewatch	·	710 m	MPC · JPL
303985	2006 BT_{108}	—	January 25, 2006	Kitt Peak	Spacewatch	NYS	1 km	MPC · JPL
303986	2006 BN_{116}	—	January 26, 2006	Kitt Peak	Spacewatch	·	1.4 km	MPC · JPL
303987	2006 BH_{117}	—	January 26, 2006	Kitt Peak	Spacewatch	·	770 m	MPC · JPL
303988	2006 BT_{120}	—	January 26, 2006	Kitt Peak	Spacewatch	·	840 m	MPC · JPL
303989	2006 BD_{132}	—	January 26, 2006	Mount Lemmon	Mount Lemmon Survey	·	940 m	MPC · JPL
303990	2006 BQ_{146}	—	January 23, 2006	Kitt Peak	Spacewatch	·	670 m	MPC · JPL
303991	2006 BD_{153}	—	January 25, 2006	Kitt Peak	Spacewatch	·	1.1 km	MPC · JPL
303992	2006 BX_{155}	—	January 25, 2006	Kitt Peak	Spacewatch	·	810 m	MPC · JPL
303993	2006 BN_{165}	—	January 26, 2006	Mount Lemmon	Mount Lemmon Survey	·	970 m	MPC · JPL
303994	2006 BN_{168}	—	January 26, 2006	Kitt Peak	Spacewatch	NYS	1.5 km	MPC · JPL
303995	2006 BO_{168}	—	January 26, 2006	Kitt Peak	Spacewatch	V	950 m	MPC · JPL
303996	2006 BY_{176}	—	January 27, 2006	Kitt Peak	Spacewatch	·	980 m	MPC · JPL
303997	2006 BK_{178}	—	January 27, 2006	Mount Lemmon	Mount Lemmon Survey	·	1.2 km	MPC · JPL
303998	2006 BT_{194}	—	January 30, 2006	Kitt Peak	Spacewatch	·	730 m	MPC · JPL
303999	2006 BQ_{211}	—	January 31, 2006	Kitt Peak	Spacewatch	L5	13 km	MPC · JPL
304000	2006 BV_{229}	—	January 31, 2006	Kitt Peak	Spacewatch	·	780 m	MPC · JPL

back to top

== See also ==
- Meanings of minor-planet names: 303001–304000
