= Meanings of minor-planet names: 303001–304000 =

As minor planet discoveries are confirmed, they are given a permanent number by the IAU's Minor Planet Center (MPC), and the discoverers can then submit names for them, following the IAU's naming conventions. The list below concerns those minor planets in the specified number-range that have received names, and explains the meanings of those names.

Official naming citations of newly named small Solar System bodies are approved and published in a bulletin by IAU's Working Group for Small Bodies Nomenclature (WGSBN). Before May 2021, citations were published in MPC's Minor Planet Circulars for many decades. Recent citations can also be found on the JPL Small-Body Database (SBDB). Until his death in 2016, German astronomer Lutz D. Schmadel compiled these citations into the Dictionary of Minor Planet Names (DMP) and regularly updated the collection.

Based on Paul Herget's The Names of the Minor Planets, Schmadel also researched the unclear origin of numerous asteroids, most of which had been named prior to World War II. This article incorporates text from this source, which is in the public domain: SBDB New namings may only be added to this list below after official publication as the preannouncement of names is condemned. The WGSBN publishes a comprehensive guideline for the naming rules of non-cometary small Solar System bodies.

== 303001–303100 ==
Named minor planet	Provisional	This minor planet was named for...	Ref · Catalog
There are no named minor planets in this number range

== 303101–303200 ==
back to top

Named minor planet	Provisional	This minor planet was named for...	Ref · Catalog
There are no named minor planets in this number range

== 303201–303300 ==
back to top

Named minor planet	Provisional	This minor planet was named for...	Ref · Catalog
303265 Littmann	2004 RH_{111}	Mark Littmann (born 1939), a professor in the School of Journalism at the University of Tennessee, where he holds the Julia G. & Alfred G. Hill Chair of Excellence in Science, Technology, and Medical Writing.	JPL · 303265

== 303301–303400 ==
back to top

Named minor planet	Provisional	This minor planet was named for...	Ref · Catalog
There are no named minor planets in this number range

== 303401–303500 ==
back to top

Named minor planet	Provisional	This minor planet was named for...	Ref · Catalog
There are no named minor planets in this number range

== 303501–303600 ==
back to top

Named minor planet	Provisional	This minor planet was named for...	Ref · Catalog
303546 Bourbaki	2005 FR	Nicolas Bourbaki, a collective pseudonym under which a group of mathematicians wrote several books on modern advanced mathematics.	JPL · 303546

== 303601–303700 ==
back to top

Named minor planet	Provisional	This minor planet was named for...	Ref · Catalog
303648 Mikszáth	2005 KC_{9}	Kálmán Mikszáth (1847–1910), a Hungarian novelist and journalist.	JPL · 303648

== 303701–303800 ==
back to top

Named minor planet	Provisional	This minor planet was named for...	Ref · Catalog
303710 Velpeau	2005 PD_{17}	Alfred-Armand-Louis-Marie Velpeau (1795–1867), a French anatomist and surgeon.	JPL · 303710

== 303801–303900 ==
back to top

Named minor planet	Provisional	This minor planet was named for...	Ref · Catalog
There are no named minor planets in this number range

== 303901–304000 ==
back to top

Named minor planet	Provisional	This minor planet was named for...	Ref · Catalog
303909 Tomknops	2005 TK_{170}	Tom Knops (1978–2011), a pilot with Tyrolean Airways. The name was proposed by Sofie Delanoye and Jeroen Maes, friends of Belgian discoverer Peter De Cat	JPL · 303909

back to top

Preceded by 302,001–303,000	Meanings of minor-planet names List of minor planets: 303,001–304,000	Succeeded by 304,001–305,000
