= List of minor planets: 566001–567000 =

The following is a partial list of minor planets, running from minor-planet number 566001 through 567000, inclusive. The primary data for this and other partial lists is based on JPL's "Small-Body Orbital Elements" and data available from the Minor Planet Center. Critical list information is also provided by the MPC, unless otherwise specified from Lowell Observatory. A detailed description of the table's columns and additional sources are given on the main page including a complete list of every page in this series, and a statistical break-up on the dynamical classification of minor planets.

Also see the summary list of all named bodies in numerical and alphabetical order, and the corresponding naming citations for the number range of this particular list. New namings may only be added to this list after official publication, as the preannouncement of names is condemned by the Working Group for Small Bodies Nomenclature of the International Astronomical Union.

Near-Earth obj.	MBA (inner)	MBA (outer)	Centaur
Mars-crosser	MBA (middle)	Jupiter trojan	Trans-Neptunian obj.
Unclassified

== 566001–566100 ==
Designation			Discovery			Properties		Ref
Permanent	Provisional	Named after	Date	Site	Discoverer(s)	Category	Diam.	Ref
566001	2017 KN_{18}	—	January 18, 2004	Palomar	NEAT	MAR	1.4 km	MPC · JPL
566002	2017 KO_{18}	—	December 8, 2015	Mount Lemmon	Mount Lemmon Survey	·	980 m	MPC · JPL
566003	2017 KW_{18}	—	October 17, 1995	Kitt Peak	Spacewatch	MRX	950 m	MPC · JPL
566004	2017 KZ_{18}	—	May 25, 2003	Kitt Peak	Spacewatch	TIN	1.1 km	MPC · JPL
566005	2017 KL_{19}	—	March 23, 2003	Kitt Peak	Spacewatch	AGN	1.0 km	MPC · JPL
566006	2017 KO_{19}	—	November 17, 2010	Kitt Peak	Spacewatch	·	1.6 km	MPC · JPL
566007	2017 KR_{19}	—	December 19, 2003	Kitt Peak	Spacewatch	·	1.0 km	MPC · JPL
566008	2017 KU_{19}	—	September 20, 2014	Haleakala	Pan-STARRS 1	·	1.2 km	MPC · JPL
566009	2017 KL_{20}	—	December 9, 2010	Kitt Peak	Spacewatch	·	1.6 km	MPC · JPL
566010	2017 KY_{20}	—	April 20, 2013	Mount Lemmon	Mount Lemmon Survey	PHO	870 m	MPC · JPL
566011	2017 KZ_{20}	—	April 29, 2000	Anderson Mesa	LONEOS	·	1.6 km	MPC · JPL
566012	2017 KL_{21}	—	October 3, 2014	Mount Lemmon	Mount Lemmon Survey	·	1.0 km	MPC · JPL
566013	2017 KG_{23}	—	December 8, 2005	Kitt Peak	Spacewatch	AGN	1.3 km	MPC · JPL
566014	2017 KL_{23}	—	March 16, 2012	Haleakala	Pan-STARRS 1	·	1.9 km	MPC · JPL
566015	2017 KC_{24}	—	June 9, 2007	Kitt Peak	Spacewatch	·	1.8 km	MPC · JPL
566016	2017 KG_{24}	—	October 17, 2001	Kitt Peak	Spacewatch	·	2.0 km	MPC · JPL
566017	2017 KV_{24}	—	January 13, 2008	Kitt Peak	Spacewatch	·	1.7 km	MPC · JPL
566018	2017 KG_{25}	—	September 13, 2004	Kitt Peak	Spacewatch	GEF	1.1 km	MPC · JPL
566019	2017 KJ_{25}	—	September 11, 2010	Mount Lemmon	Mount Lemmon Survey	EUN	1.4 km	MPC · JPL
566020	2017 KX_{26}	—	March 15, 2012	Mayhill-ISON	L. Elenin	·	2.1 km	MPC · JPL
566021	2017 KM_{28}	—	May 25, 2012	ESA OGS	ESA OGS	·	2.5 km	MPC · JPL
566022	2017 KH_{29}	—	September 19, 2006	Kitt Peak	Spacewatch	·	1.3 km	MPC · JPL
566023	2017 KJ_{29}	—	January 18, 2012	Mount Lemmon	Mount Lemmon Survey	MAR	1.1 km	MPC · JPL
566024	2017 KW_{29}	—	April 24, 1993	Kitt Peak	Spacewatch	·	2.0 km	MPC · JPL
566025	2017 KA_{30}	—	March 24, 2001	Kitt Peak	Spacewatch	·	2.2 km	MPC · JPL
566026	2017 KC_{30}	—	September 26, 2005	Kitt Peak	Spacewatch	·	2.0 km	MPC · JPL
566027	2017 KF_{30}	—	May 22, 2003	Kitt Peak	Spacewatch	·	2.2 km	MPC · JPL
566028	2017 KM_{32}	—	October 26, 2013	Nogales	M. Schwartz, P. R. Holvorcem	·	2.9 km	MPC · JPL
566029	2017 KW_{32}	—	February 28, 2008	Kitt Peak	Spacewatch	·	1.3 km	MPC · JPL
566030	2017 KA_{33}	—	April 21, 2006	Siding Spring	SSS	PHO	930 m	MPC · JPL
566031	2017 KC_{33}	—	September 19, 2001	Apache Point	SDSS Collaboration	·	2.4 km	MPC · JPL
566032	2017 KV_{35}	—	February 28, 2008	Mount Lemmon	Mount Lemmon Survey	·	1.2 km	MPC · JPL
566033	2017 KC_{37}	—	November 21, 2009	Mount Lemmon	Mount Lemmon Survey	EOS	2.1 km	MPC · JPL
566034	2017 KF_{37}	—	November 17, 1995	Kitt Peak	Spacewatch	·	2.0 km	MPC · JPL
566035	2017 KT_{38}	—	May 19, 2017	Mount Lemmon	Mount Lemmon Survey	·	1.3 km	MPC · JPL
566036	2017 LH_{1}	—	January 14, 2012	Mount Lemmon	Mount Lemmon Survey	·	1.9 km	MPC · JPL
566037	2017 LR_{1}	—	September 18, 2006	Kitt Peak	Spacewatch	·	1.5 km	MPC · JPL
566038	2017 LS_{1}	—	January 13, 2011	Mount Lemmon	Mount Lemmon Survey	·	1.9 km	MPC · JPL
566039	2017 LT_{1}	—	December 5, 2010	Mount Lemmon	Mount Lemmon Survey	·	2.7 km	MPC · JPL
566040	2017 LO_{2}	—	June 2, 2017	Cerro Tololo	M. Micheli, F. Valdes	EOS	1.7 km	MPC · JPL
566041	2017 MG	—	February 17, 2004	Kitt Peak	Spacewatch	·	1.8 km	MPC · JPL
566042	2017 MW	—	February 23, 2012	Mount Lemmon	Mount Lemmon Survey	·	1.8 km	MPC · JPL
566043	2017 MH_{3}	—	July 29, 2001	Palomar	NEAT	TIR	3.6 km	MPC · JPL
566044	2017 MQ_{3}	—	February 3, 2012	Haleakala	Pan-STARRS 1	·	1.6 km	MPC · JPL
566045	2017 MP_{4}	—	June 27, 2001	Palomar	NEAT	·	1.1 km	MPC · JPL
566046	2017 MO_{5}	—	November 9, 2007	Mount Lemmon	Mount Lemmon Survey	·	2.5 km	MPC · JPL
566047	2017 MS_{5}	—	November 20, 2006	Kitt Peak	Spacewatch	·	1.6 km	MPC · JPL
566048	2017 ME_{6}	—	January 6, 2006	Kitt Peak	Spacewatch	·	1.7 km	MPC · JPL
566049	2017 MJ_{9}	—	August 16, 2009	Catalina	CSS	·	1.5 km	MPC · JPL
566050	2017 MK_{9}	—	March 10, 2000	Socorro	LINEAR	·	1.4 km	MPC · JPL
566051	2017 MR_{9}	—	August 26, 2005	Palomar	NEAT	·	1.2 km	MPC · JPL
566052	2017 MT_{9}	—	February 8, 2008	Kitt Peak	Spacewatch	·	1.2 km	MPC · JPL
566053	2017 MB_{10}	—	June 25, 2017	Haleakala	Pan-STARRS 1	·	2.8 km	MPC · JPL
566054	2017 MQ_{13}	—	March 11, 2015	Mount Lemmon	Mount Lemmon Survey	·	2.0 km	MPC · JPL
566055	2017 MF_{15}	—	June 25, 2017	Haleakala	Pan-STARRS 1	·	2.4 km	MPC · JPL
566056	2017 MD_{16}	—	June 21, 2017	Haleakala	Pan-STARRS 1	·	2.6 km	MPC · JPL
566057	2017 ND_{1}	—	October 28, 2013	Mount Lemmon	Mount Lemmon Survey	EOS	1.7 km	MPC · JPL
566058	2017 NF_{1}	—	September 14, 2013	Haleakala	Pan-STARRS 1	·	1.4 km	MPC · JPL
566059	2017 NV_{1}	—	October 15, 2001	Palomar	NEAT	·	1.1 km	MPC · JPL
566060	2017 NY_{1}	—	January 18, 2015	Haleakala	Pan-STARRS 1	·	3.1 km	MPC · JPL
566061	2017 NH_{2}	—	January 1, 2016	Haleakala	Pan-STARRS 1	BAR	1.2 km	MPC · JPL
566062	2017 NQ_{3}	—	January 2, 2009	Kitt Peak	Spacewatch	·	2.8 km	MPC · JPL
566063	2017 NS_{3}	—	July 8, 2010	Kitt Peak	Spacewatch	·	620 m	MPC · JPL
566064	2017 NV_{3}	—	June 3, 2016	Mount Lemmon	Mount Lemmon Survey	·	2.6 km	MPC · JPL
566065	2017 NY_{5}	—	June 11, 2004	Kitt Peak	Spacewatch	·	1.8 km	MPC · JPL
566066	2017 NB_{6}	—	July 28, 2009	Catalina	CSS	·	1.7 km	MPC · JPL
566067	2017 NX_{6}	—	January 23, 2011	Mount Lemmon	Mount Lemmon Survey	·	2.5 km	MPC · JPL
566068	2017 NZ_{6}	—	June 24, 2009	Kitt Peak	Spacewatch	·	1.3 km	MPC · JPL
566069	2017 NV_{12}	—	July 4, 2017	Haleakala	Pan-STARRS 1	·	2.4 km	MPC · JPL
566070	2017 OP	—	May 31, 2006	Mount Lemmon	Mount Lemmon Survey	·	2.5 km	MPC · JPL
566071	2017 OZ_{1}	—	March 14, 2012	Haleakala	Pan-STARRS 1	·	1.8 km	MPC · JPL
566072	2017 OR_{2}	—	July 22, 2017	Sutherland-LCO C	Sutherland-LCO C	·	1.5 km	MPC · JPL
566073	2017 OF_{4}	—	November 29, 2013	Haleakala	Pan-STARRS 1	·	2.2 km	MPC · JPL
566074	2017 OM_{4}	—	August 12, 2012	Charleston	R. Holmes	·	2.9 km	MPC · JPL
566075	2017 OO_{4}	—	April 26, 2011	Kitt Peak	Spacewatch	·	1.8 km	MPC · JPL
566076	2017 OW_{6}	—	December 31, 2013	Haleakala	Pan-STARRS 1	·	2.1 km	MPC · JPL
566077	2017 OU_{7}	—	October 8, 2012	Haleakala	Pan-STARRS 1	·	3.0 km	MPC · JPL
566078	2017 OZ_{7}	—	April 15, 2007	Kitt Peak	Spacewatch	·	1.7 km	MPC · JPL
566079	2017 OT_{8}	—	July 30, 2008	Mount Lemmon	Mount Lemmon Survey	·	1.9 km	MPC · JPL
566080	2017 OB_{9}	—	May 1, 2011	Haleakala	Pan-STARRS 1	EOS	1.7 km	MPC · JPL
566081	2017 OD_{9}	—	September 3, 2008	Kitt Peak	Spacewatch	·	1.5 km	MPC · JPL
566082	2017 OF_{10}	—	January 17, 2015	Haleakala	Pan-STARRS 1	·	2.5 km	MPC · JPL
566083	2017 ON_{11}	—	January 18, 2009	Mount Lemmon	Mount Lemmon Survey	·	2.2 km	MPC · JPL
566084	2017 OE_{12}	—	May 14, 2005	Mount Lemmon	Mount Lemmon Survey	·	2.2 km	MPC · JPL
566085	2017 OX_{12}	—	December 27, 2009	Kitt Peak	Spacewatch	·	2.9 km	MPC · JPL
566086	2017 OH_{15}	—	March 7, 2016	Haleakala	Pan-STARRS 1	·	1.6 km	MPC · JPL
566087	2017 OP_{16}	—	March 30, 2016	Haleakala	Pan-STARRS 1	·	1.5 km	MPC · JPL
566088	2017 OJ_{17}	—	July 25, 2017	Haleakala	Pan-STARRS 1	·	2.3 km	MPC · JPL
566089	2017 OX_{17}	—	December 2, 2014	Haleakala	Pan-STARRS 1	·	1.8 km	MPC · JPL
566090	2017 OH_{18}	—	July 26, 2017	Haleakala	Pan-STARRS 1	EOS	1.4 km	MPC · JPL
566091	2017 ON_{18}	—	January 13, 2008	Kitt Peak	Spacewatch	·	360 m	MPC · JPL
566092	2017 OS_{20}	—	September 17, 2004	Anderson Mesa	LONEOS	·	1.7 km	MPC · JPL
566093	2017 OV_{21}	—	September 23, 2008	Kitt Peak	Spacewatch	KOR	1.0 km	MPC · JPL
566094	2017 OW_{26}	—	November 27, 2013	Haleakala	Pan-STARRS 1	·	2.7 km	MPC · JPL
566095	2017 OV_{27}	—	August 26, 2012	Haleakala	Pan-STARRS 1	·	1.5 km	MPC · JPL
566096	2017 OB_{28}	—	February 23, 2015	Haleakala	Pan-STARRS 1	·	1.8 km	MPC · JPL
566097	2017 OL_{28}	—	July 26, 2017	Haleakala	Pan-STARRS 1	EOS	1.8 km	MPC · JPL
566098	2017 OH_{30}	—	October 19, 2012	Haleakala	Pan-STARRS 1	·	3.3 km	MPC · JPL
566099	2017 OM_{30}	—	May 22, 2011	Mount Lemmon	Mount Lemmon Survey	·	1.7 km	MPC · JPL
566100	2017 OS_{31}	—	September 19, 2006	Kitt Peak	Spacewatch	·	2.4 km	MPC · JPL

== 566101–566200 ==
back to top

Designation			Discovery			Properties		Ref
Permanent	Provisional	Named after	Date	Site	Discoverer(s)	Category	Diam.	Ref
566101	2017 OT_{31}	—	February 20, 2015	Haleakala	Pan-STARRS 1	·	2.1 km	MPC · JPL
566102	2017 OJ_{35}	—	September 13, 2007	Kitt Peak	Spacewatch	EOS	1.3 km	MPC · JPL
566103	2017 OC_{36}	—	March 16, 2015	Kitt Peak	Spacewatch	·	2.4 km	MPC · JPL
566104	2017 OP_{36}	—	September 20, 2001	Apache Point	SDSS	EOS	2.2 km	MPC · JPL
566105	2017 OU_{36}	—	August 13, 2004	Cerro Tololo	Deep Ecliptic Survey	·	1.4 km	MPC · JPL
566106	2017 ON_{38}	—	September 10, 2007	Kitt Peak	Spacewatch	·	1.6 km	MPC · JPL
566107	2017 OD_{39}	—	March 26, 2011	Mount Lemmon	Mount Lemmon Survey	BRA	1.2 km	MPC · JPL
566108	2017 OP_{40}	—	March 13, 2010	Mount Lemmon	Mount Lemmon Survey	·	2.1 km	MPC · JPL
566109	2017 OV_{41}	—	October 8, 2012	Mount Lemmon	Mount Lemmon Survey	·	2.1 km	MPC · JPL
566110	2017 OV_{42}	—	October 3, 2006	Mount Lemmon	Mount Lemmon Survey	·	2.6 km	MPC · JPL
566111	2017 OJ_{43}	—	July 29, 2008	Charleston	R. Holmes	·	1.8 km	MPC · JPL
566112	2017 OP_{43}	—	February 23, 2015	Haleakala	Pan-STARRS 1	·	2.3 km	MPC · JPL
566113	2017 OM_{44}	—	December 11, 2012	Mount Lemmon	Mount Lemmon Survey	·	3.8 km	MPC · JPL
566114	2017 OG_{47}	—	January 20, 2014	Mount Lemmon	Mount Lemmon Survey	·	2.7 km	MPC · JPL
566115	2017 OL_{48}	—	May 19, 2015	Cerro Tololo	DECam	·	3.2 km	MPC · JPL
566116	2017 OX_{48}	—	July 23, 2003	Palomar	NEAT	·	2.3 km	MPC · JPL
566117	2017 OJ_{49}	—	December 2, 2005	Mount Lemmon	Mount Lemmon Survey	·	1.5 km	MPC · JPL
566118	2017 OM_{49}	—	June 4, 2003	Kitt Peak	Spacewatch	·	2.1 km	MPC · JPL
566119	2017 OR_{49}	—	August 4, 2003	Kitt Peak	Spacewatch	·	2.3 km	MPC · JPL
566120	2017 OF_{50}	—	December 30, 2008	Mount Lemmon	Mount Lemmon Survey	·	3.2 km	MPC · JPL
566121	2017 OT_{51}	—	August 19, 2006	Kitt Peak	Spacewatch	·	2.3 km	MPC · JPL
566122	2017 OW_{51}	—	September 26, 2000	Kitt Peak	Spacewatch	·	1.5 km	MPC · JPL
566123	2017 OG_{54}	—	January 16, 2015	Haleakala	Pan-STARRS 1	·	2.3 km	MPC · JPL
566124	2017 OS_{57}	—	March 21, 2015	Haleakala	Pan-STARRS 1	·	3.3 km	MPC · JPL
566125	2017 OP_{58}	—	September 11, 2007	Mount Lemmon	Mount Lemmon Survey	·	1.6 km	MPC · JPL
566126	2017 ON_{60}	—	May 30, 2016	Haleakala	Pan-STARRS 1	·	2.1 km	MPC · JPL
566127	2017 OZ_{60}	—	May 26, 2006	Mount Lemmon	Mount Lemmon Survey	·	3.6 km	MPC · JPL
566128	2017 OB_{62}	—	April 11, 2010	Mount Lemmon	Mount Lemmon Survey	·	2.3 km	MPC · JPL
566129	2017 ON_{62}	—	February 3, 2016	Haleakala	Pan-STARRS 1	·	1.4 km	MPC · JPL
566130	2017 OY_{62}	—	February 8, 2007	Kitt Peak	Spacewatch	·	1.6 km	MPC · JPL
566131	2017 OQ_{75}	—	August 29, 2006	Kitt Peak	Spacewatch	·	2.3 km	MPC · JPL
566132	2017 OA_{88}	—	July 25, 2017	Haleakala	Pan-STARRS 1	·	3.2 km	MPC · JPL
566133	2017 OU_{88}	—	July 26, 2017	Haleakala	Pan-STARRS 1	·	1.9 km	MPC · JPL
566134	2017 OV_{88}	—	July 25, 2017	Haleakala	Pan-STARRS 1	·	2.2 km	MPC · JPL
566135	2017 OW_{88}	—	July 27, 2017	Haleakala	Pan-STARRS 1	EOS	1.3 km	MPC · JPL
566136	2017 OX_{88}	—	July 26, 2017	Haleakala	Pan-STARRS 1	·	2.2 km	MPC · JPL
566137	2017 OB_{89}	—	July 22, 2017	ESA OGS	ESA OGS	·	2.1 km	MPC · JPL
566138	2017 OC_{89}	—	July 30, 2017	Haleakala	Pan-STARRS 1	·	2.5 km	MPC · JPL
566139	2017 OZ_{89}	—	April 19, 2015	Cerro Tololo	DECam	·	2.4 km	MPC · JPL
566140	2017 OZ_{90}	—	July 25, 2017	Haleakala	Pan-STARRS 1	EOS	1.5 km	MPC · JPL
566141	2017 PO	—	April 29, 2008	Mount Lemmon	Mount Lemmon Survey	·	1.0 km	MPC · JPL
566142	2017 PY_{6}	—	August 1, 2017	Haleakala	Pan-STARRS 1	·	2.2 km	MPC · JPL
566143	2017 PZ_{6}	—	October 21, 2012	Mount Lemmon	Mount Lemmon Survey	·	2.3 km	MPC · JPL
566144	2017 PM_{7}	—	October 8, 2012	Haleakala	Pan-STARRS 1	THM	2.0 km	MPC · JPL
566145	2017 PU_{7}	—	April 11, 2010	Mount Lemmon	Mount Lemmon Survey	HYG	2.6 km	MPC · JPL
566146	2017 PL_{9}	—	August 24, 2006	Pises	Pises	THM	1.8 km	MPC · JPL
566147	2017 PN_{10}	—	February 16, 2015	Haleakala	Pan-STARRS 1	·	1.7 km	MPC · JPL
566148	2017 PH_{13}	—	October 3, 2006	Mount Lemmon	Mount Lemmon Survey	·	2.5 km	MPC · JPL
566149	2017 PM_{13}	—	August 28, 2006	Catalina	CSS	·	2.6 km	MPC · JPL
566150	2017 PC_{15}	—	February 16, 2015	Haleakala	Pan-STARRS 1	·	2.4 km	MPC · JPL
566151	2017 PL_{15}	—	March 24, 2015	Mount Lemmon	Mount Lemmon Survey	·	2.4 km	MPC · JPL
566152	2017 PZ_{18}	—	January 1, 2014	Mount Lemmon	Mount Lemmon Survey	·	2.2 km	MPC · JPL
566153	2017 PT_{19}	—	November 11, 2001	Apache Point	SDSS Collaboration	·	2.6 km	MPC · JPL
566154	2017 PU_{19}	—	January 22, 2015	Haleakala	Pan-STARRS 1	·	1.4 km	MPC · JPL
566155	2017 PP_{26}	—	November 7, 2015	Catalina	CSS	H	590 m	MPC · JPL
566156	2017 PD_{29}	—	November 11, 2001	Apache Point	SDSS	·	2.4 km	MPC · JPL
566157	2017 PX_{31}	—	August 14, 2012	Haleakala	Pan-STARRS 1	EOS	1.5 km	MPC · JPL
566158	2017 PA_{33}	—	November 10, 2013	Mount Lemmon	Mount Lemmon Survey	·	1.6 km	MPC · JPL
566159	2017 PX_{33}	—	April 12, 2005	Kitt Peak	Spacewatch	·	2.8 km	MPC · JPL
566160	2017 PC_{34}	—	May 13, 2012	Mount Lemmon	Mount Lemmon Survey	·	1.3 km	MPC · JPL
566161	2017 PD_{34}	—	September 13, 2007	Mount Lemmon	Mount Lemmon Survey	·	1.3 km	MPC · JPL
566162	2017 PM_{34}	—	January 21, 2015	Haleakala	Pan-STARRS 1	·	2.5 km	MPC · JPL
566163	2017 PW_{35}	—	January 15, 2015	Haleakala	Pan-STARRS 1	URS	2.7 km	MPC · JPL
566164	2017 PE_{37}	—	January 20, 2015	Haleakala	Pan-STARRS 1	·	2.2 km	MPC · JPL
566165	2017 PF_{39}	—	March 8, 2005	Mount Lemmon	Mount Lemmon Survey	·	1.9 km	MPC · JPL
566166	2017 PD_{40}	—	January 11, 2010	Kitt Peak	Spacewatch	·	3.1 km	MPC · JPL
566167	2017 PE_{40}	—	January 31, 2006	Kitt Peak	Spacewatch	·	2.0 km	MPC · JPL
566168	2017 PX_{40}	—	March 17, 2015	Haleakala	Pan-STARRS 1	URS	2.6 km	MPC · JPL
566169	2017 PW_{56}	—	August 3, 2017	Haleakala	Pan-STARRS 1	·	1.9 km	MPC · JPL
566170	2017 QL_{3}	—	January 10, 2014	Mount Lemmon	Mount Lemmon Survey	·	2.4 km	MPC · JPL
566171	2017 QC_{5}	—	June 17, 2006	Kitt Peak	Spacewatch	·	2.4 km	MPC · JPL
566172	2017 QR_{5}	—	November 29, 2013	Haleakala	Pan-STARRS 1	EOS	2.0 km	MPC · JPL
566173	2017 QA_{6}	—	August 17, 2017	Haleakala	Pan-STARRS 1	·	1.5 km	MPC · JPL
566174	2017 QK_{6}	—	May 9, 2007	Mount Lemmon	Mount Lemmon Survey	AGN	1.2 km	MPC · JPL
566175	2017 QO_{7}	—	January 22, 2015	Haleakala	Pan-STARRS 1	VER	2.0 km	MPC · JPL
566176	2017 QC_{15}	—	September 19, 2008	Kitt Peak	Spacewatch	·	1.5 km	MPC · JPL
566177	2017 QX_{22}	—	February 5, 2009	Kitt Peak	Spacewatch	·	2.6 km	MPC · JPL
566178	2017 QX_{23}	—	February 14, 2010	Mount Lemmon	Mount Lemmon Survey	·	2.7 km	MPC · JPL
566179	2017 QM_{25}	—	August 6, 2012	Haleakala	Pan-STARRS 1	·	1.6 km	MPC · JPL
566180	2017 QV_{25}	—	September 20, 2003	Kitt Peak	Spacewatch	·	2.0 km	MPC · JPL
566181	2017 QX_{25}	—	October 24, 2009	Kitt Peak	Spacewatch	(5)	1.3 km	MPC · JPL
566182	2017 QS_{29}	—	March 12, 2016	Haleakala	Pan-STARRS 1	·	1.3 km	MPC · JPL
566183	2017 QV_{30}	—	November 4, 2012	Mount Lemmon	Mount Lemmon Survey	·	2.3 km	MPC · JPL
566184	2017 QQ_{31}	—	May 7, 2007	Kitt Peak	Spacewatch	·	2.1 km	MPC · JPL
566185	2017 QC_{37}	—	October 21, 2007	Mount Lemmon	Mount Lemmon Survey	VER	2.8 km	MPC · JPL
566186	2017 QY_{39}	—	October 9, 2008	Mount Lemmon	Mount Lemmon Survey	KOR	1.2 km	MPC · JPL
566187	2017 QX_{40}	—	January 14, 2015	Haleakala	Pan-STARRS 1	·	2.3 km	MPC · JPL
566188	2017 QS_{41}	—	September 11, 2007	Kitt Peak	Spacewatch	·	1.8 km	MPC · JPL
566189	2017 QA_{42}	—	November 27, 2013	Haleakala	Pan-STARRS 1	TIR	3.6 km	MPC · JPL
566190	2017 QH_{42}	—	February 4, 2009	Mount Lemmon	Mount Lemmon Survey	·	2.8 km	MPC · JPL
566191	2017 QN_{42}	—	July 26, 2017	Haleakala	Pan-STARRS 1	·	2.7 km	MPC · JPL
566192	2017 QK_{43}	—	February 1, 2009	Kitt Peak	Spacewatch	·	2.3 km	MPC · JPL
566193	2017 QQ_{43}	—	January 31, 2009	Kitt Peak	Spacewatch	·	2.3 km	MPC · JPL
566194	2017 QG_{44}	—	February 19, 2009	Mount Lemmon	Mount Lemmon Survey	·	2.8 km	MPC · JPL
566195	2017 QY_{45}	—	January 3, 2009	Mount Lemmon	Mount Lemmon Survey	·	3.1 km	MPC · JPL
566196	2017 QP_{46}	—	January 21, 2015	Haleakala	Pan-STARRS 1	·	1.9 km	MPC · JPL
566197	2017 QZ_{46}	—	February 17, 2010	Kitt Peak	Spacewatch	·	2.3 km	MPC · JPL
566198	2017 QU_{47}	—	October 19, 2007	Mount Lemmon	Mount Lemmon Survey	·	1.4 km	MPC · JPL
566199	2017 QN_{51}	—	March 14, 2005	Mount Lemmon	Mount Lemmon Survey	·	2.6 km	MPC · JPL
566200	2017 QO_{51}	—	December 22, 2008	Mount Lemmon	Mount Lemmon Survey	·	2.9 km	MPC · JPL

== 566201–566300 ==
back to top

Designation			Discovery			Properties		Ref
Permanent	Provisional	Named after	Date	Site	Discoverer(s)	Category	Diam.	Ref
566201	2017 QW_{51}	—	January 21, 2015	Haleakala	Pan-STARRS 1	EOS	1.7 km	MPC · JPL
566202	2017 QX_{51}	—	September 15, 2006	Kitt Peak	Spacewatch	·	2.6 km	MPC · JPL
566203	2017 QF_{52}	—	March 19, 2010	Kitt Peak	Spacewatch	·	2.3 km	MPC · JPL
566204	2017 QH_{52}	—	January 16, 2015	Haleakala	Pan-STARRS 1	·	1.6 km	MPC · JPL
566205	2017 QN_{52}	—	August 27, 2006	Kitt Peak	Spacewatch	·	3.1 km	MPC · JPL
566206	2017 QF_{53}	—	September 9, 2008	Mount Lemmon	Mount Lemmon Survey	·	2.3 km	MPC · JPL
566207	2017 QY_{53}	—	July 18, 2013	Haleakala	Pan-STARRS 1	·	2.5 km	MPC · JPL
566208	2017 QS_{54}	—	May 31, 2011	Mount Lemmon	Mount Lemmon Survey	·	1.6 km	MPC · JPL
566209	2017 QP_{55}	—	March 6, 2008	Mount Lemmon	Mount Lemmon Survey	·	1.3 km	MPC · JPL
566210	2017 QR_{55}	—	February 16, 2015	Haleakala	Pan-STARRS 1	EOS	1.5 km	MPC · JPL
566211	2017 QE_{56}	—	October 14, 2007	Bergisch Gladbach	W. Bickel	·	1.8 km	MPC · JPL
566212	2017 QT_{56}	—	August 29, 2006	Kitt Peak	Spacewatch	·	2.8 km	MPC · JPL
566213	2017 QE_{57}	—	March 4, 2016	Haleakala	Pan-STARRS 1	EOS	1.7 km	MPC · JPL
566214	2017 QL_{57}	—	October 3, 2006	Mount Lemmon	Mount Lemmon Survey	·	3.0 km	MPC · JPL
566215	2017 QA_{58}	—	August 4, 2008	La Sagra	OAM	ADE	1.8 km	MPC · JPL
566216	2017 QD_{58}	—	January 26, 2014	Haleakala	Pan-STARRS 1	·	2.8 km	MPC · JPL
566217	2017 QE_{58}	—	February 9, 2008	Mount Lemmon	Mount Lemmon Survey	·	2.8 km	MPC · JPL
566218	2017 QJ_{58}	—	October 20, 2012	Mount Lemmon	Mount Lemmon Survey	·	2.5 km	MPC · JPL
566219	2017 QU_{58}	—	June 6, 2005	Kitt Peak	Spacewatch	·	2.2 km	MPC · JPL
566220	2017 QB_{59}	—	August 21, 2011	Haleakala	Pan-STARRS 1	·	2.8 km	MPC · JPL
566221	2017 QE_{59}	—	November 2, 2006	Mount Lemmon	Mount Lemmon Survey	·	3.3 km	MPC · JPL
566222	2017 QN_{60}	—	October 20, 2007	Mount Lemmon	Mount Lemmon Survey	·	1.7 km	MPC · JPL
566223	2017 QB_{61}	—	September 9, 2008	Kitt Peak	Spacewatch	·	2.2 km	MPC · JPL
566224	2017 QN_{61}	—	September 17, 2012	Kitt Peak	Spacewatch	·	2.8 km	MPC · JPL
566225	2017 QH_{62}	—	October 8, 2012	Haleakala	Pan-STARRS 1	·	2.6 km	MPC · JPL
566226	2017 QK_{62}	—	April 12, 2016	Haleakala	Pan-STARRS 1	EOS	2.0 km	MPC · JPL
566227	2017 QN_{62}	—	August 12, 2012	Kitt Peak	Spacewatch	·	2.9 km	MPC · JPL
566228	2017 QW_{62}	—	April 4, 2005	Mount Lemmon	Mount Lemmon Survey	EOS	1.9 km	MPC · JPL
566229	2017 QK_{66}	—	September 20, 2006	Kitt Peak	Spacewatch	·	2.4 km	MPC · JPL
566230	2017 QJ_{73}	—	October 19, 1995	Kitt Peak	Spacewatch	·	2.1 km	MPC · JPL
566231	2017 QB_{92}	—	October 10, 2012	Mount Lemmon	Mount Lemmon Survey	·	2.5 km	MPC · JPL
566232	2017 QX_{92}	—	August 16, 2017	Haleakala	Pan-STARRS 1	·	2.1 km	MPC · JPL
566233	2017 QM_{97}	—	August 18, 2017	Haleakala	Pan-STARRS 1	·	2.8 km	MPC · JPL
566234	2017 QV_{97}	—	August 16, 2017	Haleakala	Pan-STARRS 1	EOS	1.5 km	MPC · JPL
566235	2017 QC_{98}	—	September 27, 2011	Mount Lemmon	Mount Lemmon Survey	·	2.6 km	MPC · JPL
566236	2017 QM_{98}	—	December 27, 2013	Mount Lemmon	Mount Lemmon Survey	EOS	1.6 km	MPC · JPL
566237	2017 RH_{6}	—	February 3, 2009	Kitt Peak	Spacewatch	·	2.5 km	MPC · JPL
566238	2017 RG_{8}	—	February 16, 2009	Kitt Peak	Spacewatch	·	2.8 km	MPC · JPL
566239	2017 RC_{11}	—	March 16, 2015	Mount Lemmon	Mount Lemmon Survey	·	1.9 km	MPC · JPL
566240	2017 RH_{12}	—	January 31, 2009	Mount Lemmon	Mount Lemmon Survey	·	2.5 km	MPC · JPL
566241	2017 RY_{13}	—	April 20, 2004	Kitt Peak	Spacewatch	·	3.5 km	MPC · JPL
566242	2017 RW_{14}	—	March 11, 2004	Palomar	NEAT	H	400 m	MPC · JPL
566243	2017 RZ_{16}	—	September 14, 2006	Kitt Peak	Spacewatch	·	2.9 km	MPC · JPL
566244	2017 RV_{18}	—	September 14, 2007	Mauna Kea	P. A. Wiegert	·	2.0 km	MPC · JPL
566245	2017 RP_{22}	—	August 26, 2012	Haleakala	Pan-STARRS 1	EOS	1.9 km	MPC · JPL
566246	2017 RF_{26}	—	September 18, 2012	Mount Lemmon	Mount Lemmon Survey	EOS	1.4 km	MPC · JPL
566247	2017 RK_{26}	—	May 21, 2010	Kitt Peak	Spacewatch	·	2.9 km	MPC · JPL
566248	2017 RN_{27}	—	January 31, 2009	Kitt Peak	Spacewatch	·	3.0 km	MPC · JPL
566249	2017 RW_{27}	—	September 5, 2000	Apache Point	SDSS Collaboration	·	3.3 km	MPC · JPL
566250	2017 RY_{27}	—	April 9, 2010	Mount Lemmon	Mount Lemmon Survey	·	2.6 km	MPC · JPL
566251	2017 RZ_{27}	—	January 1, 2009	Mount Lemmon	Mount Lemmon Survey	·	2.7 km	MPC · JPL
566252	2017 RT_{31}	—	February 26, 2004	Kitt Peak	Deep Ecliptic Survey	KOR	1.7 km	MPC · JPL
566253	2017 RF_{32}	—	September 15, 2006	Kitt Peak	Spacewatch	·	2.9 km	MPC · JPL
566254	2017 RU_{34}	—	September 17, 2012	Mount Lemmon	Mount Lemmon Survey	·	1.9 km	MPC · JPL
566255	2017 RM_{37}	—	April 9, 2010	Kitt Peak	Spacewatch	·	2.4 km	MPC · JPL
566256	2017 RX_{42}	—	August 21, 2006	Kitt Peak	Spacewatch	EOS	1.7 km	MPC · JPL
566257	2017 RS_{44}	—	September 13, 2007	Mount Lemmon	Mount Lemmon Survey	·	1.4 km	MPC · JPL
566258	2017 RF_{45}	—	September 15, 2006	Kitt Peak	Spacewatch	EOS	1.7 km	MPC · JPL
566259	2017 RB_{49}	—	October 7, 1996	Kitt Peak	Spacewatch	EOS	1.8 km	MPC · JPL
566260	2017 RF_{51}	—	April 11, 2005	Kitt Peak	Spacewatch	·	2.1 km	MPC · JPL
566261	2017 RD_{52}	—	October 28, 2006	Mount Lemmon	Mount Lemmon Survey	·	2.5 km	MPC · JPL
566262	2017 RM_{53}	—	September 30, 2006	Kitt Peak	Spacewatch	·	2.6 km	MPC · JPL
566263	2017 RL_{55}	—	July 21, 2006	Mount Lemmon	Mount Lemmon Survey	·	3.4 km	MPC · JPL
566264	2017 RZ_{57}	—	September 17, 2006	Kitt Peak	Spacewatch	TIR	3.2 km	MPC · JPL
566265	2017 RB_{58}	—	March 21, 2015	Haleakala	Pan-STARRS 1	·	2.3 km	MPC · JPL
566266	2017 RA_{60}	—	February 27, 2009	Kitt Peak	Spacewatch	·	2.8 km	MPC · JPL
566267	2017 RC_{60}	—	August 6, 2005	Palomar	NEAT	·	2.8 km	MPC · JPL
566268	2017 RH_{61}	—	May 30, 2003	Cerro Tololo	Deep Ecliptic Survey	·	2.5 km	MPC · JPL
566269	2017 RY_{62}	—	October 18, 2012	Haleakala	Pan-STARRS 1	·	2.1 km	MPC · JPL
566270	2017 RD_{65}	—	January 18, 2015	Haleakala	Pan-STARRS 1	NEM	2.0 km	MPC · JPL
566271	2017 RE_{68}	—	October 6, 2012	Haleakala	Pan-STARRS 1	EOS	1.5 km	MPC · JPL
566272	2017 RF_{69}	—	September 21, 2011	Mount Lemmon	Mount Lemmon Survey	HYG	2.8 km	MPC · JPL
566273	2017 RS_{69}	—	September 21, 1995	Kitt Peak	Spacewatch	·	1.7 km	MPC · JPL
566274	2017 RO_{73}	—	November 7, 2005	Mauna Kea	A. Boattini	·	1.7 km	MPC · JPL
566275	2017 RW_{75}	—	October 17, 2012	Haleakala	Pan-STARRS 1	·	2.2 km	MPC · JPL
566276	2017 RB_{76}	—	November 19, 2003	Kitt Peak	Spacewatch	KOR	1.3 km	MPC · JPL
566277 Sharonchan	2017 RN_{76}	Sharonchan	September 18, 2006	Mauna Kea	D. D. Balam	·	2.7 km	MPC · JPL
566278	2017 RS_{76}	—	January 31, 2009	Mount Lemmon	Mount Lemmon Survey	·	2.2 km	MPC · JPL
566279	2017 RN_{82}	—	September 22, 2001	Kitt Peak	Spacewatch	EOS	1.6 km	MPC · JPL
566280	2017 RO_{83}	—	April 4, 2010	Kitt Peak	Spacewatch	EOS	1.4 km	MPC · JPL
566281	2017 RQ_{84}	—	August 24, 2011	Haleakala	Pan-STARRS 1	·	2.4 km	MPC · JPL
566282	2017 RA_{90}	—	January 31, 2014	Haleakala	Pan-STARRS 1	·	3.1 km	MPC · JPL
566283	2017 RC_{90}	—	October 22, 2006	Kitt Peak	Spacewatch	·	2.3 km	MPC · JPL
566284	2017 RM_{90}	—	March 21, 2009	Mount Lemmon	Mount Lemmon Survey	·	2.6 km	MPC · JPL
566285	2017 RZ_{90}	—	October 22, 2012	Haleakala	Pan-STARRS 1	VER	2.4 km	MPC · JPL
566286	2017 RQ_{91}	—	March 10, 2007	Mount Lemmon	Mount Lemmon Survey	·	1.5 km	MPC · JPL
566287	2017 RY_{93}	—	September 11, 2001	Kitt Peak	Spacewatch	·	1.9 km	MPC · JPL
566288	2017 RD_{98}	—	January 16, 2005	Mauna Kea	Veillet, C.	·	720 m	MPC · JPL
566289	2017 RJ_{99}	—	March 14, 2010	Mount Lemmon	Mount Lemmon Survey	·	1.4 km	MPC · JPL
566290	2017 RV_{101}	—	February 19, 2009	Kitt Peak	Spacewatch	·	3.0 km	MPC · JPL
566291	2017 RH_{103}	—	November 9, 2007	Kitt Peak	Spacewatch	EOS	1.6 km	MPC · JPL
566292	2017 RL_{106}	—	September 15, 2007	Mount Lemmon	Mount Lemmon Survey	·	1.9 km	MPC · JPL
566293	2017 RF_{107}	—	October 11, 2010	Mount Lemmon	Mount Lemmon Survey	·	600 m	MPC · JPL
566294	2017 RK_{107}	—	October 18, 2012	Mount Lemmon	Mount Lemmon Survey	·	2.7 km	MPC · JPL
566295	2017 RY_{107}	—	March 15, 2016	Haleakala	Pan-STARRS 1	·	2.0 km	MPC · JPL
566296	2017 RV_{108}	—	September 21, 2012	Kitt Peak	Spacewatch	·	2.1 km	MPC · JPL
566297	2017 RC_{110}	—	October 20, 2006	Mount Lemmon	Mount Lemmon Survey	·	3.0 km	MPC · JPL
566298	2017 SK_{1}	—	September 18, 2001	Apache Point	SDSS	EOS	1.9 km	MPC · JPL
566299	2017 ST_{3}	—	July 9, 2005	Kitt Peak	Spacewatch	·	2.5 km	MPC · JPL
566300	2017 SB_{8}	—	July 3, 2005	Palomar	NEAT	·	3.1 km	MPC · JPL

== 566301–566400 ==
back to top

Designation			Discovery			Properties		Ref
Permanent	Provisional	Named after	Date	Site	Discoverer(s)	Category	Diam.	Ref
566301	2017 SB_{15}	—	July 4, 2003	Kitt Peak	Spacewatch	·	2.2 km	MPC · JPL
566302	2017 SV_{21}	—	November 19, 2007	Kitt Peak	Spacewatch	·	2.3 km	MPC · JPL
566303	2017 SJ_{22}	—	May 16, 2010	Mount Lemmon	Mount Lemmon Survey	·	2.7 km	MPC · JPL
566304	2017 SO_{25}	—	February 16, 2015	Haleakala	Pan-STARRS 1	·	1.9 km	MPC · JPL
566305	2017 SL_{28}	—	December 30, 2007	Kitt Peak	Spacewatch	·	2.8 km	MPC · JPL
566306	2017 SZ_{33}	—	November 8, 2008	Kitt Peak	Spacewatch	·	1.9 km	MPC · JPL
566307	2017 SC_{36}	—	December 4, 2012	Mount Lemmon	Mount Lemmon Survey	·	2.0 km	MPC · JPL
566308	2017 SV_{37}	—	October 20, 2006	Mount Lemmon	Mount Lemmon Survey	·	3.2 km	MPC · JPL
566309	2017 SO_{38}	—	October 10, 2012	Haleakala	Pan-STARRS 1	·	2.6 km	MPC · JPL
566310	2017 SB_{39}	—	September 27, 2006	Mount Lemmon	Mount Lemmon Survey	·	3.5 km	MPC · JPL
566311	2017 SD_{39}	—	September 28, 2006	Catalina	CSS	·	2.4 km	MPC · JPL
566312	2017 SY_{39}	—	October 21, 2001	Socorro	LINEAR	·	2.2 km	MPC · JPL
566313	2017 SK_{44}	—	January 23, 2015	Haleakala	Pan-STARRS 1	·	1.5 km	MPC · JPL
566314	2017 SU_{46}	—	October 8, 2012	Mount Lemmon	Mount Lemmon Survey	·	2.0 km	MPC · JPL
566315	2017 SX_{47}	—	April 20, 2007	Kitt Peak	Spacewatch	MRX	1.2 km	MPC · JPL
566316	2017 SY_{47}	—	August 21, 2006	Kitt Peak	Spacewatch	·	2.3 km	MPC · JPL
566317	2017 SE_{49}	—	October 18, 2012	Haleakala	Pan-STARRS 1	·	2.3 km	MPC · JPL
566318	2017 SS_{51}	—	October 8, 2012	Haleakala	Pan-STARRS 1	·	2.1 km	MPC · JPL
566319	2017 ST_{54}	—	October 18, 2012	Haleakala	Pan-STARRS 1	·	2.7 km	MPC · JPL
566320	2017 SX_{54}	—	August 28, 2011	Haleakala	Pan-STARRS 1	·	4.3 km	MPC · JPL
566321	2017 SY_{55}	—	July 27, 2003	Reedy Creek	J. Broughton	·	1.6 km	MPC · JPL
566322	2017 SA_{57}	—	October 2, 2006	Mount Lemmon	Mount Lemmon Survey	·	2.9 km	MPC · JPL
566323	2017 SQ_{58}	—	February 25, 2011	Mount Lemmon	Mount Lemmon Survey	·	1.6 km	MPC · JPL
566324	2017 SJ_{60}	—	August 17, 2006	Palomar	NEAT	·	2.4 km	MPC · JPL
566325	2017 ST_{62}	—	September 26, 2006	Mount Lemmon	Mount Lemmon Survey	·	2.7 km	MPC · JPL
566326	2017 SV_{62}	—	September 18, 2012	Kitt Peak	Spacewatch	TEL	1.2 km	MPC · JPL
566327	2017 SD_{63}	—	September 27, 2006	Kitt Peak	Spacewatch	·	2.9 km	MPC · JPL
566328	2017 SJ_{63}	—	October 23, 2003	Kitt Peak	Spacewatch	·	2.4 km	MPC · JPL
566329	2017 SN_{63}	—	April 13, 2004	Kitt Peak	Spacewatch	·	3.1 km	MPC · JPL
566330	2017 SS_{64}	—	January 28, 2014	Mount Lemmon	Mount Lemmon Survey	·	2.7 km	MPC · JPL
566331	2017 SR_{65}	—	March 8, 2005	Mount Lemmon	Mount Lemmon Survey	·	1.5 km	MPC · JPL
566332	2017 SF_{66}	—	May 28, 2012	Mount Lemmon	Mount Lemmon Survey	·	1.2 km	MPC · JPL
566333	2017 SN_{67}	—	October 2, 2006	Mount Lemmon	Mount Lemmon Survey	·	2.7 km	MPC · JPL
566334	2017 SQ_{67}	—	October 16, 2012	Mount Lemmon	Mount Lemmon Survey	·	2.3 km	MPC · JPL
566335	2017 SC_{68}	—	September 12, 2007	Mount Lemmon	Mount Lemmon Survey	KOR	1.3 km	MPC · JPL
566336	2017 SV_{68}	—	March 17, 2004	Kitt Peak	Spacewatch	EOS	1.5 km	MPC · JPL
566337	2017 SA_{70}	—	August 19, 2006	Kitt Peak	Spacewatch	·	2.4 km	MPC · JPL
566338	2017 SL_{72}	—	August 24, 2006	Palomar	NEAT	·	2.6 km	MPC · JPL
566339	2017 SH_{73}	—	October 2, 2006	Mount Lemmon	Mount Lemmon Survey	·	2.6 km	MPC · JPL
566340	2017 SJ_{74}	—	August 2, 2011	Haleakala	Pan-STARRS 1	·	2.9 km	MPC · JPL
566341	2017 SG_{83}	—	September 21, 2011	Mount Lemmon	Mount Lemmon Survey	·	2.3 km	MPC · JPL
566342	2017 SO_{86}	—	September 15, 2007	Mount Lemmon	Mount Lemmon Survey	·	1.7 km	MPC · JPL
566343	2017 SE_{88}	—	October 2, 2006	Mount Lemmon	Mount Lemmon Survey	·	2.4 km	MPC · JPL
566344	2017 SP_{88}	—	October 20, 2007	Kitt Peak	Spacewatch	EOS	1.4 km	MPC · JPL
566345	2017 SF_{90}	—	November 7, 2012	Mount Lemmon	Mount Lemmon Survey	·	2.4 km	MPC · JPL
566346	2017 SP_{91}	—	February 15, 2010	Kitt Peak	Spacewatch	·	1.8 km	MPC · JPL
566347	2017 SH_{93}	—	October 9, 2007	Mount Lemmon	Mount Lemmon Survey	·	1.6 km	MPC · JPL
566348	2017 SH_{94}	—	August 20, 2017	Haleakala	Pan-STARRS 1	·	2.8 km	MPC · JPL
566349	2017 SY_{94}	—	May 10, 2010	Mount Lemmon	Mount Lemmon Survey	·	2.4 km	MPC · JPL
566350	2017 SY_{98}	—	February 6, 2007	Mount Lemmon	Mount Lemmon Survey	·	3.1 km	MPC · JPL
566351	2017 SS_{101}	—	July 28, 2005	Palomar	NEAT	·	4.6 km	MPC · JPL
566352	2017 SK_{103}	—	August 2, 2011	Haleakala	Pan-STARRS 1	·	3.4 km	MPC · JPL
566353	2017 SR_{105}	—	September 23, 2000	Kitt Peak	Spacewatch	·	3.1 km	MPC · JPL
566354	2017 SM_{106}	—	November 2, 2010	Mount Lemmon	Mount Lemmon Survey	·	1.0 km	MPC · JPL
566355	2017 SN_{108}	—	January 14, 2016	Haleakala	Pan-STARRS 1	·	2.0 km	MPC · JPL
566356	2017 SF_{111}	—	February 16, 2010	Mount Lemmon	Mount Lemmon Survey	·	2.4 km	MPC · JPL
566357	2017 SW_{112}	—	April 9, 2003	Kitt Peak	Spacewatch	·	4.2 km	MPC · JPL
566358	2017 SZ_{112}	—	September 7, 2000	Kitt Peak	Spacewatch	LUT	4.0 km	MPC · JPL
566359	2017 ST_{114}	—	May 3, 2008	Kitt Peak	Spacewatch	·	1.5 km	MPC · JPL
566360	2017 SW_{114}	—	July 28, 2008	Mount Lemmon	Mount Lemmon Survey	·	1.4 km	MPC · JPL
566361	2017 SJ_{115}	—	November 8, 2010	Catalina	CSS	PHO	800 m	MPC · JPL
566362	2017 SS_{115}	—	October 19, 2006	Catalina	CSS	LIX	3.7 km	MPC · JPL
566363	2017 SG_{118}	—	August 27, 2017	XuYi	PMO NEO Survey Program	EUN	940 m	MPC · JPL
566364	2017 SE_{127}	—	April 11, 2010	Mount Lemmon	Mount Lemmon Survey	·	2.3 km	MPC · JPL
566365	2017 SK_{127}	—	October 6, 2005	Mount Lemmon	Mount Lemmon Survey	·	2.9 km	MPC · JPL
566366	2017 SY_{129}	—	March 15, 2016	Haleakala	Pan-STARRS 1	INA	2.1 km	MPC · JPL
566367	2017 SK_{132}	—	September 25, 2003	Palomar	NEAT	·	2.0 km	MPC · JPL
566368	2017 SR_{192}	—	January 31, 2009	Kitt Peak	Spacewatch	·	2.1 km	MPC · JPL
566369	2017 SR_{208}	—	September 26, 2017	Haleakala	Pan-STARRS 1	·	2.3 km	MPC · JPL
566370	2017 SF_{218}	—	June 8, 2016	Haleakala	Pan-STARRS 1	·	2.5 km	MPC · JPL
566371	2017 TQ_{8}	—	December 15, 2001	Apache Point	SDSS Collaboration	·	4.3 km	MPC · JPL
566372	2017 TW_{8}	—	January 16, 2015	Haleakala	Pan-STARRS 1	TIR	2.8 km	MPC · JPL
566373	2017 TG_{9}	—	October 23, 2006	Nashville	Clingan, R.	·	2.7 km	MPC · JPL
566374	2017 TR_{12}	—	December 1, 2004	Palomar	NEAT	EUN	1.2 km	MPC · JPL
566375	2017 UW_{1}	—	November 7, 2012	Haleakala	Pan-STARRS 1	H	500 m	MPC · JPL
566376	2017 UZ_{8}	—	December 9, 2012	Haleakala	Pan-STARRS 1	·	2.8 km	MPC · JPL
566377	2017 UE_{9}	—	August 24, 2011	Haleakala	Pan-STARRS 1	VER	2.6 km	MPC · JPL
566378	2017 UP_{9}	—	August 28, 2012	Mount Lemmon	Mount Lemmon Survey	·	2.6 km	MPC · JPL
566379	2017 UG_{10}	—	October 15, 2004	Kitt Peak	Spacewatch	·	1.3 km	MPC · JPL
566380	2017 UV_{12}	—	October 1, 2005	Kitt Peak	Spacewatch	·	3.0 km	MPC · JPL
566381	2017 UT_{14}	—	April 24, 2012	Haleakala	Pan-STARRS 1	·	1.7 km	MPC · JPL
566382	2017 UU_{15}	—	September 25, 2006	Mount Lemmon	Mount Lemmon Survey	HYG	2.4 km	MPC · JPL
566383	2017 UC_{17}	—	March 13, 2010	Kitt Peak	Spacewatch	·	2.3 km	MPC · JPL
566384	2017 UB_{18}	—	September 19, 2006	Kitt Peak	Spacewatch	·	2.6 km	MPC · JPL
566385	2017 UU_{18}	—	October 21, 2012	Kitt Peak	Spacewatch	EOS	1.9 km	MPC · JPL
566386	2017 UT_{19}	—	October 7, 2012	Haleakala	Pan-STARRS 1	·	1.7 km	MPC · JPL
566387	2017 UK_{20}	—	February 27, 2006	Kitt Peak	Spacewatch	·	2.1 km	MPC · JPL
566388	2017 UB_{21}	—	September 5, 2000	Apache Point	SDSS	TIR	3.1 km	MPC · JPL
566389	2017 US_{22}	—	December 5, 2012	Mount Lemmon	Mount Lemmon Survey	·	2.8 km	MPC · JPL
566390	2017 UR_{23}	—	November 11, 2001	Apache Point	SDSS Collaboration	·	2.6 km	MPC · JPL
566391	2017 UP_{24}	—	September 4, 2011	Kitt Peak	Spacewatch	·	3.0 km	MPC · JPL
566392	2017 UL_{26}	—	October 15, 2001	Apache Point	SDSS Collaboration	·	2.0 km	MPC · JPL
566393	2017 UG_{31}	—	September 18, 2006	Kitt Peak	Spacewatch	·	2.5 km	MPC · JPL
566394	2017 UH_{32}	—	March 21, 2015	Haleakala	Pan-STARRS 1	·	2.4 km	MPC · JPL
566395	2017 UY_{33}	—	October 12, 2006	Kitt Peak	Spacewatch	·	2.5 km	MPC · JPL
566396	2017 UL_{35}	—	February 14, 2016	Haleakala	Pan-STARRS 1	·	2.0 km	MPC · JPL
566397	2017 UK_{51}	—	April 14, 2002	Kitt Peak	Spacewatch	H	410 m	MPC · JPL
566398	2017 UF_{114}	—	October 22, 2017	Mount Lemmon	Mount Lemmon Survey	·	440 m	MPC · JPL
566399	2017 VE_{1}	—	May 30, 2016	Haleakala	Pan-STARRS 1	H	640 m	MPC · JPL
566400	2017 VU_{1}	—	February 3, 2016	Haleakala	Pan-STARRS 1	H	520 m	MPC · JPL

== 566401–566500 ==
back to top

Designation			Discovery			Properties		Ref
Permanent	Provisional	Named after	Date	Site	Discoverer(s)	Category	Diam.	Ref
566401	2017 VR_{2}	—	February 1, 2009	Kitt Peak	Spacewatch	EOS	1.8 km	MPC · JPL
566402	2017 VR_{10}	—	October 1, 2003	Anderson Mesa	LONEOS	·	2.1 km	MPC · JPL
566403	2017 VA_{17}	—	October 19, 2006	Kitt Peak	Spacewatch	·	2.6 km	MPC · JPL
566404	2017 VO_{19}	—	September 29, 2011	Mount Lemmon	Mount Lemmon Survey	·	2.9 km	MPC · JPL
566405	2017 VR_{25}	—	September 26, 2006	Catalina	CSS	·	2.9 km	MPC · JPL
566406	2017 WE_{4}	—	January 18, 2009	Kitt Peak	Spacewatch	·	2.1 km	MPC · JPL
566407	2017 WY_{15}	—	December 9, 2015	Haleakala	Pan-STARRS 1	H	390 m	MPC · JPL
566408	2017 XH	—	September 30, 2003	Socorro	LINEAR	H	630 m	MPC · JPL
566409	2017 XC_{14}	—	October 4, 2011	Črni Vrh	Zakrajsek, J.	EUP	3.5 km	MPC · JPL
566410	2017 XP_{44}	—	October 12, 2006	Palomar	NEAT	·	3.0 km	MPC · JPL
566411	2017 XL_{45}	—	January 15, 2007	Mauna Kea	P. A. Wiegert	·	3.2 km	MPC · JPL
566412	2017 XC_{48}	—	March 19, 2013	Haleakala	Pan-STARRS 1	3:2 · SHU	5.7 km	MPC · JPL
566413	2017 XP_{50}	—	October 30, 2017	Haleakala	Pan-STARRS 1	3:2	3.5 km	MPC · JPL
566414	2017 XO_{53}	—	September 24, 2011	Haleakala	Pan-STARRS 1	T_{j} (2.99)	3.3 km	MPC · JPL
566415	2017 XK_{54}	—	November 24, 2006	Mount Lemmon	Mount Lemmon Survey	THM	2.1 km	MPC · JPL
566416	2017 YY_{1}	—	July 7, 2013	La Sagra	OAM	·	910 m	MPC · JPL
566417	2017 YO_{2}	—	December 15, 2012	ESA OGS	ESA OGS	·	3.6 km	MPC · JPL
566418	2017 YN_{4}	—	September 1, 2011	Siding Spring	SSS	T_{j} (2.97)	4.4 km	MPC · JPL
566419	2017 YZ_{6}	—	January 17, 2007	Catalina	CSS	H	630 m	MPC · JPL
566420	2017 YR_{7}	—	February 15, 2010	Catalina	CSS	H	640 m	MPC · JPL
566421	2017 YJ_{8}	—	October 2, 2017	Mount Lemmon	Mount Lemmon Survey	H	570 m	MPC · JPL
566422	2018 AD	—	April 14, 2008	Mount Lemmon	Mount Lemmon Survey	H	430 m	MPC · JPL
566423	2018 AS	—	February 6, 2013	Kitt Peak	Spacewatch	H	440 m	MPC · JPL
566424	2018 AZ_{1}	—	August 27, 2003	Palomar	NEAT	H	480 m	MPC · JPL
566425	2018 AS_{3}	—	November 19, 2017	Haleakala	Pan-STARRS 1	·	950 m	MPC · JPL
566426	2018 AN_{4}	—	January 22, 2015	Haleakala	Pan-STARRS 1	H	490 m	MPC · JPL
566427	2018 AB_{14}	—	July 10, 2005	Kitt Peak	Spacewatch	H	480 m	MPC · JPL
566428	2018 AO_{15}	—	January 19, 2015	Haleakala	Pan-STARRS 1	H	480 m	MPC · JPL
566429	2018 BF	—	December 3, 2004	Kitt Peak	Spacewatch	H	570 m	MPC · JPL
566430	2018 BG	—	December 16, 2007	Catalina	CSS	H	710 m	MPC · JPL
566431	2018 BA_{4}	—	September 19, 2011	Catalina	CSS	H	530 m	MPC · JPL
566432	2018 BT_{4}	—	August 24, 2011	Haleakala	Pan-STARRS 1	H	410 m	MPC · JPL
566433	2018 BD_{23}	—	April 29, 2008	Mount Lemmon	Mount Lemmon Survey	V	600 m	MPC · JPL
566434	2018 CF	—	November 21, 2009	Mount Lemmon	Mount Lemmon Survey	H	500 m	MPC · JPL
566435	2018 CG_{1}	—	May 20, 2003	Anderson Mesa	LONEOS	H	580 m	MPC · JPL
566436	2018 CH_{7}	—	November 28, 2017	Mount Lemmon	Mount Lemmon Survey	H	520 m	MPC · JPL
566437	2018 CR_{7}	—	August 23, 2008	Siding Spring	SSS	H	590 m	MPC · JPL
566438	2018 CF_{9}	—	August 18, 2014	Haleakala	Pan-STARRS 1	H	490 m	MPC · JPL
566439	2018 DD	—	September 16, 2014	Haleakala	Pan-STARRS 1	H	460 m	MPC · JPL
566440	2018 ED	—	October 2, 2011	Haleakala	Pan-STARRS 1	H	540 m	MPC · JPL
566441	2018 EV	—	November 23, 2014	Haleakala	Pan-STARRS 1	H	390 m	MPC · JPL
566442	2018 EZ_{1}	—	March 7, 2018	Haleakala	Pan-STARRS 1	centaur	30 km	MPC · JPL
566443	2018 EG_{2}	—	September 24, 2011	Catalina	CSS	H	370 m	MPC · JPL
566444	2018 ED_{5}	—	May 25, 2007	Mount Lemmon	Mount Lemmon Survey	·	1.0 km	MPC · JPL
566445	2018 EQ_{6}	—	July 30, 2005	Palomar	NEAT	H	590 m	MPC · JPL
566446	2018 FJ	—	February 8, 2010	La Silla	Megevand, D.	H	500 m	MPC · JPL
566447	2018 FS	—	April 29, 2013	Haleakala	Pan-STARRS 1	H	420 m	MPC · JPL
566448	2018 FX	—	October 3, 2011	Catalina	CSS	H	550 m	MPC · JPL
566449	2018 FS_{4}	—	December 18, 2014	Haleakala	Pan-STARRS 1	H	420 m	MPC · JPL
566450	2018 FC_{19}	—	March 10, 2011	Kitt Peak	Spacewatch	·	610 m	MPC · JPL
566451	2018 FM_{20}	—	August 8, 2004	Anderson Mesa	LONEOS	·	1.2 km	MPC · JPL
566452	2018 FN_{20}	—	May 7, 2014	Haleakala	Pan-STARRS 1	·	1.3 km	MPC · JPL
566453	2018 FT_{20}	—	January 24, 2015	Haleakala	Pan-STARRS 1	H	400 m	MPC · JPL
566454	2018 FN_{21}	—	July 28, 2015	Haleakala	Pan-STARRS 1	·	990 m	MPC · JPL
566455	2018 FJ_{25}	—	May 4, 2005	Kitt Peak	Spacewatch	·	640 m	MPC · JPL
566456	2018 FU_{25}	—	September 28, 2006	Kitt Peak	Spacewatch	·	760 m	MPC · JPL
566457	2018 FY_{28}	—	October 16, 2003	Kitt Peak	Spacewatch	·	750 m	MPC · JPL
566458	2018 FF_{32}	—	March 26, 2003	Kitt Peak	Spacewatch	MAS	700 m	MPC · JPL
566459	2018 GK	—	September 30, 2009	Mount Lemmon	Mount Lemmon Survey	H	510 m	MPC · JPL
566460	2018 GE_{1}	—	March 3, 2005	Socorro	LINEAR	·	460 m	MPC · JPL
566461	2018 GL_{5}	—	January 20, 2015	Haleakala	Pan-STARRS 1	H	410 m	MPC · JPL
566462	2018 GM_{8}	—	March 13, 2012	Kitt Peak	Spacewatch	·	2.2 km	MPC · JPL
566463	2018 HA_{2}	—	March 8, 2008	Mount Lemmon	Mount Lemmon Survey	·	490 m	MPC · JPL
566464	2018 HJ_{3}	—	August 29, 2005	Kitt Peak	Spacewatch	·	750 m	MPC · JPL
566465	2018 HF_{5}	—	September 25, 2009	Kitt Peak	Spacewatch	·	500 m	MPC · JPL
566466	2018 JQ	—	April 11, 2007	Catalina	CSS	PHO	1.5 km	MPC · JPL
566467	2018 JT	—	September 21, 2016	Haleakala	Pan-STARRS 1	H	510 m	MPC · JPL
566468	2018 JD_{1}	—	March 4, 2005	Kitt Peak	Spacewatch	H	470 m	MPC · JPL
566469	2018 JO_{2}	—	November 16, 2006	Kitt Peak	Spacewatch	·	740 m	MPC · JPL
566470	2018 JP_{2}	—	July 20, 2012	Siding Spring	SSS	·	660 m	MPC · JPL
566471	2018 JE_{4}	—	January 31, 2011	Bergisch Gladbach	W. Bickel	·	730 m	MPC · JPL
566472	2018 JL_{6}	—	June 3, 2011	Mount Lemmon	Mount Lemmon Survey	·	960 m	MPC · JPL
566473	2018 KS_{1}	—	May 13, 2018	Mount Lemmon	Mount Lemmon Survey	H	500 m	MPC · JPL
566474	2018 KA_{3}	—	September 25, 2005	Kitt Peak	Spacewatch	·	530 m	MPC · JPL
566475	2018 KA_{4}	—	November 19, 2014	Catalina	CSS	·	1.4 km	MPC · JPL
566476	2018 LO_{1}	—	September 29, 2009	Mount Lemmon	Mount Lemmon Survey	·	720 m	MPC · JPL
566477	2018 LC_{5}	—	June 13, 2002	Palomar	NEAT	·	1.8 km	MPC · JPL
566478	2018 LU_{6}	—	December 19, 2009	Kitt Peak	Spacewatch	V	760 m	MPC · JPL
566479	2018 LV_{7}	—	April 5, 2014	Haleakala	Pan-STARRS 1	V	510 m	MPC · JPL
566480	2018 LJ_{11}	—	March 14, 2013	Kitt Peak	Spacewatch	·	1.8 km	MPC · JPL
566481	2018 LR_{14}	—	September 17, 2004	Kitt Peak	Spacewatch	·	840 m	MPC · JPL
566482	2018 LX_{14}	—	October 26, 2015	Haleakala	Pan-STARRS 1	·	970 m	MPC · JPL
566483	2018 MY_{1}	—	October 23, 2001	Palomar	NEAT	·	1.0 km	MPC · JPL
566484	2018 MB_{2}	—	July 30, 2008	Kitt Peak	Spacewatch	·	630 m	MPC · JPL
566485	2018 MK_{4}	—	March 13, 2005	Kitt Peak	Spacewatch	·	660 m	MPC · JPL
566486	2018 ML_{4}	—	September 9, 2015	Haleakala	Pan-STARRS 1	·	550 m	MPC · JPL
566487	2018 MO_{4}	—	May 3, 2000	Socorro	LINEAR	·	1.4 km	MPC · JPL
566488	2018 MY_{7}	—	December 17, 1999	Kitt Peak	Spacewatch	·	1.2 km	MPC · JPL
566489	2018 MA_{8}	—	June 24, 2014	Mount Lemmon	Mount Lemmon Survey	·	1.3 km	MPC · JPL
566490	2018 MH_{8}	—	October 9, 2008	Mount Lemmon	Mount Lemmon Survey	·	1.2 km	MPC · JPL
566491	2018 MT_{8}	—	November 6, 2005	Kitt Peak	Spacewatch	·	480 m	MPC · JPL
566492	2018 NV_{4}	—	October 25, 2005	Kitt Peak	Spacewatch	PHO	1.4 km	MPC · JPL
566493	2018 NX_{5}	—	October 27, 2005	Mount Lemmon	Mount Lemmon Survey	AGN	1.0 km	MPC · JPL
566494	2018 NY_{5}	—	December 1, 2006	Mount Lemmon	Mount Lemmon Survey	WIT	840 m	MPC · JPL
566495	2018 NE_{6}	—	March 12, 2013	Palomar	Palomar Transient Factory	EUN	1.5 km	MPC · JPL
566496	2018 NX_{8}	—	November 4, 2005	Kitt Peak	Spacewatch	V	540 m	MPC · JPL
566497	2018 NR_{9}	—	October 28, 2008	Kitt Peak	Spacewatch	V	680 m	MPC · JPL
566498	2018 NB_{13}	—	January 1, 2009	Mount Lemmon	Mount Lemmon Survey	V	440 m	MPC · JPL
566499	2018 NG_{13}	—	May 24, 2011	Nogales	M. Schwartz, P. R. Holvorcem	·	700 m	MPC · JPL
566500	2018 NQ_{13}	—	October 16, 2007	Mount Lemmon	Mount Lemmon Survey	NYS	1.4 km	MPC · JPL

== 566501–566600 ==
back to top

Designation			Discovery			Properties		Ref
Permanent	Provisional	Named after	Date	Site	Discoverer(s)	Category	Diam.	Ref
566501	2018 NU_{13}	—	August 21, 2004	Catalina	CSS	·	770 m	MPC · JPL
566502	2018 NB_{14}	—	October 3, 2011	Les Engarouines	L. Bernasconi	·	1.3 km	MPC · JPL
566503	2018 NC_{14}	—	November 3, 2005	Kitt Peak	Spacewatch	·	610 m	MPC · JPL
566504	2018 NW_{14}	—	November 16, 2010	Catalina	CSS	EUN	1.3 km	MPC · JPL
566505	2018 NC_{22}	—	July 10, 2018	Haleakala	Pan-STARRS 1	·	620 m	MPC · JPL
566506	2018 OF_{1}	—	September 4, 2011	Haleakala	Pan-STARRS 1	·	590 m	MPC · JPL
566507	2018 OS_{1}	—	October 18, 2011	Catalina	CSS	·	1.5 km	MPC · JPL
566508	2018 OA_{2}	—	August 26, 2011	Haleakala	Pan-STARRS 1	·	1.3 km	MPC · JPL
566509	2018 PE	—	May 21, 2010	Nogales	M. Schwartz, P. R. Holvorcem	·	1.7 km	MPC · JPL
566510	2018 PR_{1}	—	August 23, 2007	Kitt Peak	Spacewatch	·	930 m	MPC · JPL
566511	2018 PS_{1}	—	September 26, 2011	Haleakala	Pan-STARRS 1	NYS	760 m	MPC · JPL
566512	2018 PB_{2}	—	June 16, 2018	Haleakala	Pan-STARRS 1	·	1.0 km	MPC · JPL
566513	2018 PR_{5}	—	April 15, 2008	Mount Lemmon	Mount Lemmon Survey	·	1.3 km	MPC · JPL
566514	2018 PS_{5}	—	January 1, 2012	Mount Lemmon	Mount Lemmon Survey	·	1.1 km	MPC · JPL
566515	2018 PX_{10}	—	December 30, 2007	Kitt Peak	Spacewatch	(5)	1.2 km	MPC · JPL
566516	2018 PM_{11}	—	September 4, 2003	Kitt Peak	Spacewatch	·	1.5 km	MPC · JPL
566517	2018 PK_{12}	—	March 14, 2007	Mount Lemmon	Mount Lemmon Survey	·	700 m	MPC · JPL
566518	2018 PQ_{12}	—	April 3, 2008	Kitt Peak	Spacewatch	·	1.9 km	MPC · JPL
566519	2018 PE_{14}	—	April 18, 2013	Mount Lemmon	Mount Lemmon Survey	·	1.4 km	MPC · JPL
566520	2018 PQ_{14}	—	February 4, 2016	Haleakala	Pan-STARRS 1	·	2.5 km	MPC · JPL
566521	2018 PO_{15}	—	February 3, 2016	Haleakala	Pan-STARRS 1	·	2.8 km	MPC · JPL
566522	2018 PF_{16}	—	March 31, 2011	Haleakala	Pan-STARRS 1	·	510 m	MPC · JPL
566523	2018 PK_{19}	—	December 16, 2014	Haleakala	Pan-STARRS 1	·	1.7 km	MPC · JPL
566524	2018 PK_{25}	—	August 11, 2007	Charleston	R. Holmes	·	2.2 km	MPC · JPL
566525	2018 PN_{26}	—	October 8, 2010	Kitt Peak	Spacewatch	·	1.2 km	MPC · JPL
566526	2018 PM_{27}	—	September 18, 2014	Haleakala	Pan-STARRS 1	·	1.4 km	MPC · JPL
566527	2018 PF_{31}	—	February 1, 2016	Haleakala	Pan-STARRS 1	·	1.3 km	MPC · JPL
566528	2018 PX_{31}	—	February 21, 2007	Kitt Peak	Spacewatch	·	1.9 km	MPC · JPL
566529	2018 PF_{32}	—	September 30, 2003	Kitt Peak	Spacewatch	3:2	3.6 km	MPC · JPL
566530	2018 PN_{33}	—	July 2, 2014	Mount Lemmon	Mount Lemmon Survey	PHO	770 m	MPC · JPL
566531	2018 PV_{54}	—	August 12, 2018	Haleakala	Pan-STARRS 1	·	1.4 km	MPC · JPL
566532	2018 QC_{3}	—	September 24, 2009	Mount Lemmon	Mount Lemmon Survey	·	1.4 km	MPC · JPL
566533	2018 QJ_{3}	—	November 20, 2006	Kitt Peak	Spacewatch	(5)	890 m	MPC · JPL
566534	2018 QD_{5}	—	November 20, 2014	Haleakala	Pan-STARRS 1	·	1.3 km	MPC · JPL
566535	2018 QE_{5}	—	October 14, 2001	Socorro	LINEAR	·	790 m	MPC · JPL
566536	2018 QF_{6}	—	July 2, 2011	Kitt Peak	Spacewatch	·	700 m	MPC · JPL
566537	2018 QJ_{6}	—	August 12, 2004	Palomar	NEAT	·	1.0 km	MPC · JPL
566538	2018 QK_{6}	—	August 25, 2014	Haleakala	Pan-STARRS 1	EUN	910 m	MPC · JPL
566539	2018 RQ_{6}	—	October 18, 2001	Kitt Peak	Spacewatch	BAR	850 m	MPC · JPL
566540	2018 RW_{7}	—	September 8, 2018	XuYi	PMO NEO Survey Program	APO	170 m	MPC · JPL
566541	2018 RB_{9}	—	December 24, 2005	Kitt Peak	Spacewatch	AGN	1.0 km	MPC · JPL
566542	2018 RJ_{12}	—	July 15, 2018	XuYi	PMO NEO Survey Program	·	1.8 km	MPC · JPL
566543	2018 RU_{12}	—	November 19, 2007	Kitt Peak	Spacewatch	·	960 m	MPC · JPL
566544	2018 RW_{13}	—	February 4, 2009	Mount Lemmon	Mount Lemmon Survey	·	1.4 km	MPC · JPL
566545	2018 RD_{14}	—	September 28, 2013	Mount Lemmon	Mount Lemmon Survey	·	1.8 km	MPC · JPL
566546	2018 RE_{14}	—	August 17, 2018	Haleakala	Pan-STARRS 1	MRX	910 m	MPC · JPL
566547	2018 RE_{15}	—	August 26, 2001	Palomar	NEAT	·	1.3 km	MPC · JPL
566548	2018 RO_{15}	—	October 1, 2002	Haleakala	NEAT	·	1.8 km	MPC · JPL
566549	2018 RP_{15}	—	December 20, 2014	Haleakala	Pan-STARRS 1	·	1.7 km	MPC · JPL
566550	2018 RK_{16}	—	August 6, 2005	Palomar	NEAT	·	2.2 km	MPC · JPL
566551	2018 RM_{16}	—	September 11, 2010	Mount Lemmon	Mount Lemmon Survey	·	1.3 km	MPC · JPL
566552	2018 RQ_{16}	—	September 10, 2007	Kitt Peak	Spacewatch	NYS	880 m	MPC · JPL
566553	2018 RM_{17}	—	December 22, 2005	Kitt Peak	Spacewatch	·	1.8 km	MPC · JPL
566554	2018 RQ_{17}	—	November 1, 2006	Mount Lemmon	Mount Lemmon Survey	·	1.4 km	MPC · JPL
566555	2018 RK_{18}	—	January 25, 2007	Kitt Peak	Spacewatch	EUN	1.1 km	MPC · JPL
566556	2018 RM_{18}	—	July 13, 2013	Haleakala	Pan-STARRS 1	·	2.7 km	MPC · JPL
566557	2018 RE_{19}	—	September 9, 2008	Mount Lemmon	Mount Lemmon Survey	V	550 m	MPC · JPL
566558	2018 RJ_{19}	—	October 1, 2000	Socorro	LINEAR	MAS	660 m	MPC · JPL
566559	2018 RY_{21}	—	September 14, 2007	Mount Lemmon	Mount Lemmon Survey	·	1.2 km	MPC · JPL
566560	2018 RC_{22}	—	December 20, 2009	Mount Lemmon	Mount Lemmon Survey	·	1.9 km	MPC · JPL
566561	2018 RP_{22}	—	January 11, 2000	Kitt Peak	Spacewatch	·	870 m	MPC · JPL
566562	2018 RH_{23}	—	June 17, 2006	Kitt Peak	Spacewatch	·	2.9 km	MPC · JPL
566563	2018 RS_{23}	—	April 25, 2007	Kitt Peak	Spacewatch	·	2.4 km	MPC · JPL
566564	2018 RA_{24}	—	April 2, 2011	Mount Lemmon	Mount Lemmon Survey	·	2.3 km	MPC · JPL
566565	2018 RB_{24}	—	August 9, 2007	Kitt Peak	Spacewatch	·	2.6 km	MPC · JPL
566566	2018 RJ_{24}	—	November 26, 2014	Haleakala	Pan-STARRS 1	GEF	1.1 km	MPC · JPL
566567	2018 RL_{24}	—	November 18, 2011	Mount Lemmon	Mount Lemmon Survey	·	910 m	MPC · JPL
566568	2018 RN_{24}	—	August 14, 2001	Haleakala	NEAT	EUN	1.3 km	MPC · JPL
566569	2018 RX_{24}	—	December 30, 2005	Kitt Peak	Spacewatch	·	2.3 km	MPC · JPL
566570	2018 RQ_{25}	—	September 24, 2009	Mount Lemmon	Mount Lemmon Survey	MRX	1.1 km	MPC · JPL
566571	2018 RY_{25}	—	August 20, 2004	Kitt Peak	Spacewatch	·	1.6 km	MPC · JPL
566572	2018 RZ_{26}	—	October 18, 2014	Mount Lemmon	Mount Lemmon Survey	·	1.4 km	MPC · JPL
566573	2018 RD_{27}	—	May 26, 2011	Mount Lemmon	Mount Lemmon Survey	·	480 m	MPC · JPL
566574	2018 RE_{27}	—	September 17, 2004	Kitt Peak	Spacewatch	AGN	1.3 km	MPC · JPL
566575	2018 RO_{28}	—	November 16, 2010	Mount Lemmon	Mount Lemmon Survey	·	2.3 km	MPC · JPL
566576	2018 RQ_{28}	—	June 20, 2013	Haleakala	Pan-STARRS 1	·	1.9 km	MPC · JPL
566577	2018 RX_{28}	—	October 25, 2013	Mount Lemmon	Mount Lemmon Survey	BRA	1.3 km	MPC · JPL
566578	2018 RB_{29}	—	September 20, 2007	Kitt Peak	Spacewatch	HYG	2.5 km	MPC · JPL
566579	2018 RY_{29}	—	May 21, 2011	Haleakala	Pan-STARRS 1	VER	3.2 km	MPC · JPL
566580	2018 RK_{30}	—	December 16, 2011	Mount Lemmon	Mount Lemmon Survey	·	980 m	MPC · JPL
566581	2018 RL_{30}	—	September 15, 2007	Anderson Mesa	LONEOS	·	1.2 km	MPC · JPL
566582	2018 RS_{30}	—	July 27, 2014	Haleakala	Pan-STARRS 1	·	1.4 km	MPC · JPL
566583	2018 RU_{30}	—	September 2, 2000	Socorro	LINEAR	·	1.2 km	MPC · JPL
566584	2018 RV_{30}	—	January 3, 2017	Haleakala	Pan-STARRS 1	·	1.2 km	MPC · JPL
566585	2018 RB_{31}	—	June 27, 2001	Kitt Peak	Spacewatch	·	1.3 km	MPC · JPL
566586	2018 RN_{31}	—	November 10, 2005	Catalina	CSS	·	1.8 km	MPC · JPL
566587	2018 RP_{31}	—	March 16, 2012	Mount Lemmon	Mount Lemmon Survey	EUN	1.2 km	MPC · JPL
566588	2018 RT_{31}	—	April 10, 2013	Kitt Peak	Spacewatch	·	1.8 km	MPC · JPL
566589	2018 RY_{31}	—	December 21, 2006	Palomar	NEAT	·	1.5 km	MPC · JPL
566590	2018 RB_{32}	—	May 15, 2009	Kitt Peak	Spacewatch	EUN	1.1 km	MPC · JPL
566591	2018 RK_{32}	—	October 30, 2008	Mount Lemmon	Mount Lemmon Survey	·	3.0 km	MPC · JPL
566592	2018 RP_{32}	—	December 6, 2007	Mount Lemmon	Mount Lemmon Survey	·	1.5 km	MPC · JPL
566593	2018 RU_{32}	—	September 12, 2007	Catalina	CSS	·	1.5 km	MPC · JPL
566594	2018 RW_{32}	—	October 24, 2011	Haleakala	Pan-STARRS 1	·	1.3 km	MPC · JPL
566595	2018 RB_{33}	—	August 13, 2010	Kitt Peak	Spacewatch	T_{j} (2.93)	3.5 km	MPC · JPL
566596	2018 RG_{33}	—	February 7, 2011	Mount Lemmon	Mount Lemmon Survey	·	1.8 km	MPC · JPL
566597	2018 RM_{33}	—	November 12, 2005	Kitt Peak	Spacewatch	·	2.1 km	MPC · JPL
566598	2018 RC_{34}	—	January 28, 2007	Mount Lemmon	Mount Lemmon Survey	·	1.7 km	MPC · JPL
566599	2018 RG_{34}	—	August 27, 2011	Haleakala	Pan-STARRS 1	·	580 m	MPC · JPL
566600	2018 RH_{34}	—	April 28, 2014	Kitt Peak	Spacewatch	·	880 m	MPC · JPL

== 566601–566700 ==
back to top

Designation			Discovery			Properties		Ref
Permanent	Provisional	Named after	Date	Site	Discoverer(s)	Category	Diam.	Ref
566601	2018 RJ_{34}	—	December 7, 2005	Kitt Peak	Spacewatch	·	1.6 km	MPC · JPL
566602	2018 RK_{34}	—	December 16, 2006	Mount Lemmon	Mount Lemmon Survey	·	1.4 km	MPC · JPL
566603	2018 RJ_{35}	—	October 3, 2008	La Sagra	OAM	PHO	880 m	MPC · JPL
566604	2018 RR_{35}	—	October 26, 2005	Kitt Peak	Spacewatch	·	1.8 km	MPC · JPL
566605	2018 RX_{35}	—	May 24, 2006	Mount Lemmon	Mount Lemmon Survey	V	650 m	MPC · JPL
566606	2018 RZ_{36}	—	September 28, 2011	ESA OGS	ESA OGS	·	760 m	MPC · JPL
566607	2018 RF_{37}	—	January 1, 2012	Mount Lemmon	Mount Lemmon Survey	MAR	1.1 km	MPC · JPL
566608	2018 RL_{37}	—	October 16, 2009	Catalina	CSS	·	1.9 km	MPC · JPL
566609	2018 RT_{37}	—	September 12, 2007	Catalina	CSS	·	3.0 km	MPC · JPL
566610	2018 RU_{37}	—	October 10, 2007	Mount Lemmon	Mount Lemmon Survey	·	2.8 km	MPC · JPL
566611	2018 RX_{37}	—	July 1, 2011	Haleakala	Pan-STARRS 1	·	1.1 km	MPC · JPL
566612	2018 RB_{38}	—	October 26, 2008	Kitt Peak	Spacewatch	·	1.7 km	MPC · JPL
566613	2018 RL_{38}	—	October 3, 2013	Mount Lemmon	Mount Lemmon Survey	·	2.8 km	MPC · JPL
566614	2018 RV_{39}	—	September 17, 2012	Mount Lemmon	Mount Lemmon Survey	·	3.4 km	MPC · JPL
566615	2018 RJ_{44}	—	October 14, 2013	Mount Lemmon	Mount Lemmon Survey	·	2.6 km	MPC · JPL
566616	2018 RQ_{51}	—	September 17, 2009	Mount Lemmon	Mount Lemmon Survey	GEF	1.0 km	MPC · JPL
566617	2018 SS_{2}	—	May 6, 2016	Haleakala	Pan-STARRS 1	PAL	1.9 km	MPC · JPL
566618	2018 SB_{4}	—	February 8, 2011	Mount Lemmon	Mount Lemmon Survey	GEF	1.0 km	MPC · JPL
566619	2018 SM_{4}	—	April 5, 2005	Mount Lemmon	Mount Lemmon Survey	·	3.4 km	MPC · JPL
566620	2018 SS_{4}	—	October 26, 2014	Mount Lemmon	Mount Lemmon Survey	·	1.6 km	MPC · JPL
566621	2018 SB_{5}	—	January 30, 2011	Kitt Peak	Spacewatch	·	2.8 km	MPC · JPL
566622	2018 SC_{5}	—	October 27, 2011	Mount Lemmon	Mount Lemmon Survey	V	740 m	MPC · JPL
566623	2018 SD_{5}	—	October 1, 2009	Mount Lemmon	Mount Lemmon Survey	·	2.6 km	MPC · JPL
566624	2018 SL_{5}	—	February 11, 2016	Haleakala	Pan-STARRS 1	·	2.1 km	MPC · JPL
566625	2018 ST_{5}	—	May 3, 2009	Mount Lemmon	Mount Lemmon Survey	·	1.7 km	MPC · JPL
566626	2018 SU_{5}	—	October 2, 2014	Haleakala	Pan-STARRS 1	·	1.4 km	MPC · JPL
566627	2018 SX_{5}	—	September 19, 2009	Catalina	CSS	·	2.0 km	MPC · JPL
566628	2018 SA_{6}	—	March 18, 2009	Kitt Peak	Spacewatch	T_{j} (2.96)	4.5 km	MPC · JPL
566629	2018 SB_{6}	—	November 17, 2001	Anderson Mesa	LONEOS	·	3.2 km	MPC · JPL
566630	2018 SD_{6}	—	November 8, 2008	Mount Lemmon	Mount Lemmon Survey	·	3.1 km	MPC · JPL
566631 Svábhegy	2018 SH_{6}	Svábhegy	November 1, 2010	Piszkéstető	K. Sárneczky, Z. Kuli	·	1.9 km	MPC · JPL
566632	2018 SV_{6}	—	October 1, 2002	Anderson Mesa	LONEOS	·	2.3 km	MPC · JPL
566633	2018 SK_{7}	—	October 8, 2002	Palomar	NEAT	·	3.4 km	MPC · JPL
566634	2018 SD_{8}	—	February 2, 2009	Kitt Peak	Spacewatch	LIX	2.9 km	MPC · JPL
566635	2018 SH_{8}	—	March 8, 2005	Mount Lemmon	Mount Lemmon Survey	·	2.9 km	MPC · JPL
566636	2018 SL_{8}	—	August 5, 2005	Palomar	NEAT	·	1.7 km	MPC · JPL
566637	2018 ST_{8}	—	January 28, 2007	Kitt Peak	Spacewatch	·	1.8 km	MPC · JPL
566638	2018 SW_{8}	—	October 10, 2002	Palomar	NEAT	EMA	3.6 km	MPC · JPL
566639	2018 SZ_{8}	—	May 22, 2006	Kitt Peak	Spacewatch	·	2.6 km	MPC · JPL
566640	2018 SJ_{9}	—	September 2, 2014	Haleakala	Pan-STARRS 1	·	1.2 km	MPC · JPL
566641	2018 SK_{9}	—	October 30, 2005	Catalina	CSS	HNS	1.7 km	MPC · JPL
566642	2018 SR_{9}	—	January 18, 2015	Mount Lemmon	Mount Lemmon Survey	·	3.1 km	MPC · JPL
566643	2018 SS_{9}	—	September 11, 2014	Haleakala	Pan-STARRS 1	HNS	1.4 km	MPC · JPL
566644	2018 SE_{10}	—	August 6, 2014	Haleakala	Pan-STARRS 1	·	1.2 km	MPC · JPL
566645	2018 SG_{10}	—	October 22, 2003	Apache Point	SDSS	·	2.1 km	MPC · JPL
566646	2018 SK_{10}	—	December 4, 2008	Mount Lemmon	Mount Lemmon Survey	·	3.9 km	MPC · JPL
566647	2018 SR_{10}	—	November 4, 2007	Kitt Peak	Spacewatch	·	1.1 km	MPC · JPL
566648	2018 SX_{10}	—	September 19, 2001	Socorro	LINEAR	·	3.5 km	MPC · JPL
566649	2018 SZ_{10}	—	March 6, 2008	Mount Lemmon	Mount Lemmon Survey	·	1.2 km	MPC · JPL
566650	2018 SB_{11}	—	June 16, 2006	Kitt Peak	Spacewatch	·	2.7 km	MPC · JPL
566651	2018 SK_{11}	—	November 5, 2005	Kitt Peak	Spacewatch	NEM	2.0 km	MPC · JPL
566652	2018 SL_{11}	—	November 29, 2005	Kitt Peak	Spacewatch	·	2.1 km	MPC · JPL
566653	2018 SX_{11}	—	June 24, 2014	Haleakala	Pan-STARRS 1	·	1.2 km	MPC · JPL
566654	2018 SZ_{11}	—	July 6, 2003	Kitt Peak	Spacewatch	·	2.3 km	MPC · JPL
566655	2018 SJ_{12}	—	September 17, 2009	Catalina	CSS	·	2.3 km	MPC · JPL
566656	2018 SL_{12}	—	May 9, 2000	Kitt Peak	Spacewatch	·	1.9 km	MPC · JPL
566657	2018 SN_{12}	—	February 2, 2009	Mount Lemmon	Mount Lemmon Survey	TIR	3.3 km	MPC · JPL
566658	2018 SD_{13}	—	June 10, 2013	Mount Lemmon	Mount Lemmon Survey	GAL	1.4 km	MPC · JPL
566659	2018 SS_{13}	—	August 20, 2009	La Sagra	OAM	·	1.5 km	MPC · JPL
566660	2018 SC_{14}	—	January 30, 2011	Mount Lemmon	Mount Lemmon Survey	·	2.0 km	MPC · JPL
566661	2018 SH_{14}	—	December 22, 2008	Kitt Peak	Spacewatch	·	2.6 km	MPC · JPL
566662	2018 SJ_{14}	—	March 16, 2015	Haleakala	Pan-STARRS 1	TIR	3.1 km	MPC · JPL
566663	2018 SK_{14}	—	June 30, 2014	Haleakala	Pan-STARRS 1	·	2.2 km	MPC · JPL
566664	2018 SM_{14}	—	May 16, 2009	Kitt Peak	Spacewatch	·	1.1 km	MPC · JPL
566665	2018 ST_{14}	—	September 27, 2008	Mount Lemmon	Mount Lemmon Survey	·	1.8 km	MPC · JPL
566666	2018 SW_{14}	—	September 28, 2003	Kitt Peak	Spacewatch	EOS	1.9 km	MPC · JPL
566667	2018 SZ_{14}	—	June 20, 2001	Palomar	NEAT	·	930 m	MPC · JPL
566668	2018 SE_{15}	—	April 29, 2008	Mount Lemmon	Mount Lemmon Survey	AGN	1.1 km	MPC · JPL
566669	2018 SF_{15}	—	September 22, 2003	Kitt Peak	Spacewatch	·	1.0 km	MPC · JPL
566670	2018 SM_{15}	—	December 29, 2014	Haleakala	Pan-STARRS 1	·	1.8 km	MPC · JPL
566671	2018 SS_{15}	—	September 20, 2009	Mount Lemmon	Mount Lemmon Survey	AGN	1.0 km	MPC · JPL
566672	2018 TK_{7}	—	May 26, 2007	Mount Lemmon	Mount Lemmon Survey	KOR	1.6 km	MPC · JPL
566673	2018 TC_{8}	—	October 8, 2010	Kitt Peak	Spacewatch	·	930 m	MPC · JPL
566674	2018 TH_{8}	—	October 10, 2002	Palomar	NEAT	EOS	1.8 km	MPC · JPL
566675	2018 TO_{8}	—	April 14, 2007	Mount Lemmon	Mount Lemmon Survey	·	1.8 km	MPC · JPL
566676	2018 TV_{8}	—	December 25, 2005	Mount Lemmon	Mount Lemmon Survey	GEF	1.3 km	MPC · JPL
566677	2018 TY_{8}	—	April 6, 2011	Mount Lemmon	Mount Lemmon Survey	·	2.4 km	MPC · JPL
566678	2018 TZ_{8}	—	July 24, 2003	Palomar	NEAT	·	2.2 km	MPC · JPL
566679	2018 TC_{9}	—	October 27, 2005	Kitt Peak	Spacewatch	·	1.5 km	MPC · JPL
566680	2018 TD_{9}	—	September 16, 2009	Kitt Peak	Spacewatch	·	1.8 km	MPC · JPL
566681	2018 TJ_{9}	—	November 23, 2006	Kitt Peak	Spacewatch	·	1.9 km	MPC · JPL
566682	2018 TS_{9}	—	October 6, 2004	Kitt Peak	Spacewatch	·	850 m	MPC · JPL
566683	2018 TY_{9}	—	September 9, 2004	Socorro	LINEAR	·	2.4 km	MPC · JPL
566684	2018 TQ_{10}	—	May 21, 2012	Mount Lemmon	Mount Lemmon Survey	·	2.9 km	MPC · JPL
566685	2018 TV_{10}	—	September 20, 2009	Kitt Peak	Spacewatch	·	1.4 km	MPC · JPL
566686	2018 TV_{11}	—	November 18, 2009	Kitt Peak	Spacewatch	·	2.3 km	MPC · JPL
566687	2018 TZ_{11}	—	January 1, 2009	Kitt Peak	Spacewatch	·	2.7 km	MPC · JPL
566688	2018 TO_{12}	—	December 10, 2010	Mount Lemmon	Mount Lemmon Survey	·	1.5 km	MPC · JPL
566689	2018 TA_{13}	—	August 31, 2014	Catalina	CSS	·	1.8 km	MPC · JPL
566690	2018 TF_{13}	—	September 4, 2007	Catalina	CSS	MAS	710 m	MPC · JPL
566691	2018 TK_{13}	—	November 21, 2014	Mount Lemmon	Mount Lemmon Survey	·	1.7 km	MPC · JPL
566692	2018 TL_{13}	—	March 23, 2004	Kitt Peak	Spacewatch	MAR	1.2 km	MPC · JPL
566693	2018 TG_{14}	—	October 15, 2004	Mount Lemmon	Mount Lemmon Survey	·	890 m	MPC · JPL
566694	2018 TW_{14}	—	March 9, 2011	Mount Lemmon	Mount Lemmon Survey	·	2.4 km	MPC · JPL
566695	2018 TZ_{16}	—	September 15, 2006	Kitt Peak	Spacewatch	·	2.1 km	MPC · JPL
566696	2018 TY_{18}	—	October 8, 2007	Mount Lemmon	Mount Lemmon Survey	EOS	1.5 km	MPC · JPL
566697	2018 TG_{20}	—	October 26, 2005	Kitt Peak	Spacewatch	WIT	740 m	MPC · JPL
566698	2018 TH_{20}	—	September 10, 2007	Kitt Peak	Spacewatch	(21885)	2.3 km	MPC · JPL
566699	2018 TG_{22}	—	November 6, 2005	Kitt Peak	Spacewatch	·	1.5 km	MPC · JPL
566700	2018 TF_{25}	—	October 15, 2018	Haleakala	Pan-STARRS 2	·	3.7 km	MPC · JPL

== 566701–566800 ==
back to top

Designation			Discovery			Properties		Ref
Permanent	Provisional	Named after	Date	Site	Discoverer(s)	Category	Diam.	Ref
566701	2018 TG_{25}	—	October 4, 2018	Haleakala	Pan-STARRS 2	·	2.0 km	MPC · JPL
566702	2018 TH_{25}	—	October 15, 2018	Haleakala	Pan-STARRS 2	EUN	1.3 km	MPC · JPL
566703	2018 TP_{25}	—	October 15, 2018	Haleakala	Pan-STARRS 2	·	1.5 km	MPC · JPL
566704	2018 TO_{27}	—	September 13, 2007	Mount Lemmon	Mount Lemmon Survey	·	2.5 km	MPC · JPL
566705	2018 TE_{29}	—	May 1, 2016	Cerro Tololo	DECam	·	1.9 km	MPC · JPL
566706	2018 UJ_{3}	—	April 26, 2009	Siding Spring	SSS	·	1.5 km	MPC · JPL
566707	2018 UO_{3}	—	August 31, 2005	Kitt Peak	Spacewatch	·	1.2 km	MPC · JPL
566708	2018 US_{3}	—	August 30, 2005	Campo Imperatore	CINEOS	EUN	1.3 km	MPC · JPL
566709	2018 UO_{4}	—	October 8, 2007	Catalina	CSS	·	3.2 km	MPC · JPL
566710	2018 UQ_{4}	—	May 31, 2011	Mount Lemmon	Mount Lemmon Survey	EOS	2.1 km	MPC · JPL
566711	2018 UW_{4}	—	September 1, 2005	Kitt Peak	Spacewatch	ADE	1.8 km	MPC · JPL
566712	2018 UX_{4}	—	September 13, 2007	Catalina	CSS	·	3.2 km	MPC · JPL
566713	2018 UE_{5}	—	August 23, 2001	Kitt Peak	Spacewatch	·	2.7 km	MPC · JPL
566714	2018 UU_{5}	—	July 24, 1995	Kitt Peak	Spacewatch	·	2.1 km	MPC · JPL
566715	2018 UX_{5}	—	September 23, 2009	Mount Lemmon	Mount Lemmon Survey	·	2.1 km	MPC · JPL
566716	2018 UY_{5}	—	November 8, 2009	Kitt Peak	Spacewatch	·	2.0 km	MPC · JPL
566717	2018 UA_{6}	—	November 10, 1993	Kitt Peak	Spacewatch	·	1.7 km	MPC · JPL
566718	2018 UX_{6}	—	October 20, 2001	Socorro	LINEAR	·	3.0 km	MPC · JPL
566719	2018 UK_{7}	—	January 26, 2006	Kitt Peak	Spacewatch	·	2.2 km	MPC · JPL
566720	2018 UL_{7}	—	January 14, 2008	Kitt Peak	Spacewatch	NYS	1.2 km	MPC · JPL
566721	2018 UM_{7}	—	August 22, 2003	Palomar	NEAT	KOR	1.7 km	MPC · JPL
566722	2018 UW_{7}	—	April 9, 2016	Haleakala	Pan-STARRS 1	EUN	960 m	MPC · JPL
566723	2018 UC_{8}	—	April 22, 2007	Mount Lemmon	Mount Lemmon Survey	·	2.6 km	MPC · JPL
566724	2018 UH_{8}	—	October 23, 2004	Pla D'Arguines	R. Ferrando	·	1.6 km	MPC · JPL
566725	2018 UC_{9}	—	April 28, 2011	Mount Lemmon	Mount Lemmon Survey	·	1.9 km	MPC · JPL
566726	2018 UQ_{9}	—	October 13, 2004	Kitt Peak	Spacewatch	·	1.7 km	MPC · JPL
566727	2018 UA_{10}	—	October 17, 2001	Kitt Peak	Spacewatch	·	2.7 km	MPC · JPL
566728	2018 UD_{10}	—	November 4, 2013	Kitt Peak	Spacewatch	EOS	1.8 km	MPC · JPL
566729	2018 UE_{10}	—	September 27, 2008	Mount Lemmon	Mount Lemmon Survey	·	2.2 km	MPC · JPL
566730	2018 UH_{10}	—	May 20, 2012	Haleakala	Pan-STARRS 1	WIT	930 m	MPC · JPL
566731	2018 UN_{10}	—	December 6, 2008	Kitt Peak	Spacewatch	·	2.6 km	MPC · JPL
566732	2018 UX_{10}	—	September 26, 2011	Moletai	K. Černis, Zdanavicius, J.	·	790 m	MPC · JPL
566733	2018 UZ_{10}	—	September 22, 2009	Mount Lemmon	Mount Lemmon Survey	·	1.9 km	MPC · JPL
566734	2018 UG_{11}	—	November 9, 2013	Mount Lemmon	Mount Lemmon Survey	·	2.7 km	MPC · JPL
566735	2018 UK_{11}	—	December 16, 2014	Haleakala	Pan-STARRS 1	·	1.6 km	MPC · JPL
566736	2018 UL_{12}	—	December 31, 2013	Mount Lemmon	Mount Lemmon Survey	EOS	1.9 km	MPC · JPL
566737	2018 UX_{12}	—	September 25, 2005	Kitt Peak	Spacewatch	ADE	1.5 km	MPC · JPL
566738	2018 UF_{13}	—	March 6, 2011	Kitt Peak	Spacewatch	·	2.2 km	MPC · JPL
566739	2018 UG_{13}	—	October 6, 2005	Anderson Mesa	LONEOS	EUN	1 km	MPC · JPL
566740	2018 UM_{13}	—	August 27, 2013	Haleakala	Pan-STARRS 1	·	2.1 km	MPC · JPL
566741	2018 UR_{13}	—	November 20, 2007	Kitt Peak	Spacewatch	·	4.0 km	MPC · JPL
566742	2018 UX_{13}	—	November 26, 2013	Haleakala	Pan-STARRS 1	EOS	2.0 km	MPC · JPL
566743	2018 UV_{14}	—	October 10, 2007	Kitt Peak	Spacewatch	·	3.4 km	MPC · JPL
566744	2018 UW_{14}	—	October 12, 2007	Mount Lemmon	Mount Lemmon Survey	·	2.5 km	MPC · JPL
566745	2018 UY_{14}	—	January 7, 2006	Kitt Peak	Spacewatch	MRX	890 m	MPC · JPL
566746	2018 UB_{15}	—	January 28, 2007	Mount Lemmon	Mount Lemmon Survey	·	2.0 km	MPC · JPL
566747	2018 US_{15}	—	July 14, 2013	Haleakala	Pan-STARRS 1	NEM	2.0 km	MPC · JPL
566748	2018 UZ_{15}	—	March 10, 2007	Kitt Peak	Spacewatch	·	2.0 km	MPC · JPL
566749	2018 UG_{16}	—	December 3, 2004	Kitt Peak	Spacewatch	·	2.2 km	MPC · JPL
566750	2018 UR_{16}	—	November 28, 2013	Mount Lemmon	Mount Lemmon Survey	·	2.6 km	MPC · JPL
566751	2018 US_{16}	—	November 18, 2009	Kitt Peak	Spacewatch	·	1.7 km	MPC · JPL
566752	2018 UC_{17}	—	October 6, 2018	Mount Lemmon	Mount Lemmon Survey	·	2.2 km	MPC · JPL
566753	2018 UE_{17}	—	February 7, 2002	Kitt Peak	Spacewatch	·	1.7 km	MPC · JPL
566754	2018 UG_{17}	—	October 25, 2014	Mount Lemmon	Mount Lemmon Survey	EUN	950 m	MPC · JPL
566755	2018 US_{17}	—	July 5, 2000	Kitt Peak	Spacewatch	·	1.8 km	MPC · JPL
566756	2018 UV_{17}	—	December 9, 2010	Mount Lemmon	Mount Lemmon Survey	·	1.5 km	MPC · JPL
566757	2018 UF_{18}	—	August 14, 2013	Haleakala	Pan-STARRS 1	·	1.4 km	MPC · JPL
566758	2018 UJ_{18}	—	October 9, 2013	Mount Lemmon	Mount Lemmon Survey	·	2.3 km	MPC · JPL
566759	2018 UO_{18}	—	December 27, 2006	Mount Lemmon	Mount Lemmon Survey	·	1.1 km	MPC · JPL
566760	2018 UW_{18}	—	February 18, 2004	Kitt Peak	Spacewatch	·	3.4 km	MPC · JPL
566761	2018 UG_{21}	—	October 26, 2009	Kitt Peak	Spacewatch	·	1.5 km	MPC · JPL
566762	2018 UG_{26}	—	October 16, 2018	Haleakala	Pan-STARRS 2	·	1.4 km	MPC · JPL
566763	2018 UQ_{28}	—	October 14, 2007	Mount Lemmon	Mount Lemmon Survey	·	2.0 km	MPC · JPL
566764	2018 VX_{7}	—	September 10, 2007	Kitt Peak	Spacewatch	·	2.1 km	MPC · JPL
566765	2018 VV_{10}	—	October 5, 2013	Kitt Peak	Spacewatch	EOS	1.7 km	MPC · JPL
566766	2018 VF_{11}	—	February 3, 2009	Kitt Peak	Spacewatch	·	2.3 km	MPC · JPL
566767	2018 VP_{11}	—	November 8, 2009	Mount Lemmon	Mount Lemmon Survey	·	1.6 km	MPC · JPL
566768	2018 VY_{11}	—	April 9, 2010	Kitt Peak	Spacewatch	·	3.0 km	MPC · JPL
566769	2018 VZ_{11}	—	September 30, 2011	Kitt Peak	Spacewatch	·	810 m	MPC · JPL
566770	2018 VP_{12}	—	October 14, 2009	Mount Lemmon	Mount Lemmon Survey	·	1.6 km	MPC · JPL
566771	2018 VD_{13}	—	December 2, 2005	Kitt Peak	Spacewatch	·	1.8 km	MPC · JPL
566772	2018 VG_{13}	—	October 10, 2007	Mount Lemmon	Mount Lemmon Survey	·	3.1 km	MPC · JPL
566773	2018 VX_{13}	—	February 13, 2002	Apache Point	SDSS Collaboration	·	1.5 km	MPC · JPL
566774	2018 VL_{14}	—	September 20, 2007	Kitt Peak	Spacewatch	·	2.6 km	MPC · JPL
566775	2018 VC_{15}	—	September 25, 2005	Kitt Peak	Spacewatch	ADE	1.7 km	MPC · JPL
566776	2018 VF_{15}	—	March 31, 2008	Mount Lemmon	Mount Lemmon Survey	·	1.5 km	MPC · JPL
566777	2018 VJ_{15}	—	May 17, 2009	Mount Lemmon	Mount Lemmon Survey	·	910 m	MPC · JPL
566778	2018 VK_{15}	—	March 23, 2004	Kitt Peak	Spacewatch	·	2.8 km	MPC · JPL
566779	2018 VL_{15}	—	May 31, 2011	Mount Lemmon	Mount Lemmon Survey	·	3.0 km	MPC · JPL
566780	2018 VM_{15}	—	November 30, 2008	Kitt Peak	Spacewatch	EOS	2.1 km	MPC · JPL
566781	2018 VN_{15}	—	January 2, 2009	Kitt Peak	Spacewatch	·	2.6 km	MPC · JPL
566782	2018 VO_{15}	—	November 13, 2015	Mount Lemmon	Mount Lemmon Survey	·	710 m	MPC · JPL
566783	2018 VP_{15}	—	May 1, 2011	Haleakala	Pan-STARRS 1	·	2.4 km	MPC · JPL
566784	2018 VV_{15}	—	August 18, 2009	Kitt Peak	Spacewatch	·	1.5 km	MPC · JPL
566785	2018 VZ_{15}	—	May 1, 2011	Haleakala	Pan-STARRS 1	·	2.6 km	MPC · JPL
566786	2018 VG_{16}	—	June 9, 2013	Mount Lemmon	Mount Lemmon Survey	·	1.6 km	MPC · JPL
566787	2018 VJ_{16}	—	January 17, 2015	Haleakala	Pan-STARRS 1	·	2.7 km	MPC · JPL
566788	2018 VX_{16}	—	September 18, 2007	Kitt Peak	Spacewatch	ARM	4.0 km	MPC · JPL
566789	2018 VZ_{16}	—	December 29, 2013	Haleakala	Pan-STARRS 1	·	2.6 km	MPC · JPL
566790	2018 VF_{17}	—	January 11, 2011	Mount Lemmon	Mount Lemmon Survey	·	1.5 km	MPC · JPL
566791	2018 VH_{17}	—	November 4, 2005	Mount Lemmon	Mount Lemmon Survey	·	690 m	MPC · JPL
566792	2018 VK_{17}	—	December 12, 2014	Haleakala	Pan-STARRS 1	·	1.3 km	MPC · JPL
566793	2018 VS_{17}	—	November 1, 2007	Kitt Peak	Spacewatch	·	3.2 km	MPC · JPL
566794	2018 VU_{18}	—	October 24, 2013	Mount Lemmon	Mount Lemmon Survey	·	1.7 km	MPC · JPL
566795	2018 VL_{19}	—	December 11, 2013	Haleakala	Pan-STARRS 1	·	2.5 km	MPC · JPL
566796	2018 VC_{20}	—	April 26, 2017	Haleakala	Pan-STARRS 1	·	2.7 km	MPC · JPL
566797	2018 VE_{20}	—	September 5, 2007	Mount Lemmon	Mount Lemmon Survey	·	2.0 km	MPC · JPL
566798	2018 VT_{20}	—	December 27, 2011	Kitt Peak	Spacewatch	·	1.2 km	MPC · JPL
566799	2018 VF_{21}	—	September 26, 2009	Kitt Peak	Spacewatch	·	2.0 km	MPC · JPL
566800	2018 VT_{21}	—	November 5, 2007	Kitt Peak	Spacewatch	VER	2.7 km	MPC · JPL

== 566801–566900 ==
back to top

Designation			Discovery			Properties		Ref
Permanent	Provisional	Named after	Date	Site	Discoverer(s)	Category	Diam.	Ref
566801	2018 VK_{23}	—	November 4, 2014	Mount Lemmon	Mount Lemmon Survey	·	1.1 km	MPC · JPL
566802	2018 VT_{23}	—	March 14, 2010	Mount Lemmon	Mount Lemmon Survey	·	2.5 km	MPC · JPL
566803	2018 VB_{24}	—	November 3, 2014	Mount Lemmon	Mount Lemmon Survey	·	2.1 km	MPC · JPL
566804	2018 VD_{24}	—	October 7, 2007	Mount Lemmon	Mount Lemmon Survey	·	3.0 km	MPC · JPL
566805	2018 VR_{24}	—	April 20, 2012	Siding Spring	SSS	·	1.8 km	MPC · JPL
566806	2018 VR_{25}	—	October 8, 2007	Mount Lemmon	Mount Lemmon Survey	EOS	1.8 km	MPC · JPL
566807	2018 VT_{25}	—	August 16, 2006	Lulin	LUSS	HYG	2.8 km	MPC · JPL
566808	2018 VV_{25}	—	September 12, 2007	Mount Lemmon	Mount Lemmon Survey	·	2.4 km	MPC · JPL
566809	2018 VY_{25}	—	October 10, 2004	Kitt Peak	Spacewatch	·	1.8 km	MPC · JPL
566810	2018 VE_{26}	—	December 25, 2005	Kitt Peak	Spacewatch	·	1.7 km	MPC · JPL
566811	2018 VR_{26}	—	December 14, 2013	Mount Lemmon	Mount Lemmon Survey	·	2.5 km	MPC · JPL
566812	2018 VX_{26}	—	October 8, 2005	Catalina	CSS	ADE	2.4 km	MPC · JPL
566813	2018 VJ_{27}	—	April 16, 2013	Haleakala	Pan-STARRS 1	(194)	1.8 km	MPC · JPL
566814	2018 VR_{27}	—	October 17, 2007	Catalina	CSS	·	2.5 km	MPC · JPL
566815	2018 VS_{27}	—	October 15, 2001	Palomar	NEAT	·	3.2 km	MPC · JPL
566816	2018 VG_{28}	—	October 15, 2018	Haleakala	Pan-STARRS 2	·	2.5 km	MPC · JPL
566817	2018 VC_{29}	—	December 6, 2013	Haleakala	Pan-STARRS 1	TIR	2.4 km	MPC · JPL
566818	2018 VD_{29}	—	October 24, 2007	Mount Lemmon	Mount Lemmon Survey	·	2.8 km	MPC · JPL
566819	2018 VE_{29}	—	October 31, 2013	Kitt Peak	Spacewatch	·	2.6 km	MPC · JPL
566820	2018 VH_{29}	—	October 8, 2004	Kitt Peak	Spacewatch	·	2.3 km	MPC · JPL
566821	2018 VU_{29}	—	August 8, 2012	Haleakala	Pan-STARRS 1	EOS	1.6 km	MPC · JPL
566822	2018 VW_{29}	—	December 15, 2001	Socorro	LINEAR	·	2.1 km	MPC · JPL
566823	2018 VP_{30}	—	July 30, 2005	Palomar	NEAT	·	1.4 km	MPC · JPL
566824	2018 VS_{30}	—	August 18, 2009	Catalina	CSS	·	1.8 km	MPC · JPL
566825	2018 VO_{32}	—	June 25, 2017	Haleakala	Pan-STARRS 1	·	2.1 km	MPC · JPL
566826	2018 VX_{32}	—	April 26, 2000	Kitt Peak	Spacewatch	EOS	2.2 km	MPC · JPL
566827	2018 VB_{33}	—	December 31, 2008	Kitt Peak	Spacewatch	·	2.1 km	MPC · JPL
566828	2018 VE_{33}	—	September 17, 2004	Anderson Mesa	LONEOS	·	2.3 km	MPC · JPL
566829	2018 VE_{34}	—	January 31, 2009	Mount Lemmon	Mount Lemmon Survey	·	3.4 km	MPC · JPL
566830	2018 VL_{34}	—	April 7, 2011	Kitt Peak	Spacewatch	·	1.6 km	MPC · JPL
566831	2018 VN_{34}	—	November 8, 2013	Kitt Peak	Spacewatch	·	2.0 km	MPC · JPL
566832	2018 VU_{34}	—	January 3, 2009	Mount Lemmon	Mount Lemmon Survey	EOS	2.0 km	MPC · JPL
566833	2018 VA_{35}	—	October 16, 2003	Anderson Mesa	LONEOS	PHO	860 m	MPC · JPL
566834	2018 VB_{35}	—	October 10, 2007	Kitt Peak	Spacewatch	·	3.3 km	MPC · JPL
566835	2018 VJ_{35}	—	January 19, 2008	Mount Lemmon	Mount Lemmon Survey	EUN	1.6 km	MPC · JPL
566836	2018 VP_{35}	—	August 26, 2012	Haleakala	Pan-STARRS 1	·	1.9 km	MPC · JPL
566837	2018 VS_{35}	—	September 22, 2012	Kitt Peak	Spacewatch	EOS	1.6 km	MPC · JPL
566838	2018 VW_{35}	—	October 18, 2001	Kitt Peak	Spacewatch	·	2.3 km	MPC · JPL
566839	2018 VA_{36}	—	October 30, 2007	Mount Lemmon	Mount Lemmon Survey	EOS	1.3 km	MPC · JPL
566840	2018 VD_{36}	—	September 19, 2001	Kitt Peak	Spacewatch	·	2.8 km	MPC · JPL
566841	2018 VE_{36}	—	October 9, 2012	Mount Lemmon	Mount Lemmon Survey	·	2.0 km	MPC · JPL
566842	2018 VO_{36}	—	January 1, 2014	Mount Lemmon	Mount Lemmon Survey	·	2.6 km	MPC · JPL
566843	2018 VQ_{36}	—	April 10, 2005	Mount Lemmon	Mount Lemmon Survey	·	2.1 km	MPC · JPL
566844	2018 VT_{36}	—	July 18, 2013	Haleakala	Pan-STARRS 1	·	1.8 km	MPC · JPL
566845	2018 VU_{36}	—	February 16, 2015	Haleakala	Pan-STARRS 1	·	2.1 km	MPC · JPL
566846	2018 VK_{37}	—	February 18, 2010	Kitt Peak	Spacewatch	·	2.1 km	MPC · JPL
566847	2018 VT_{37}	—	October 24, 2013	Kitt Peak	Spacewatch	·	1.8 km	MPC · JPL
566848	2018 VY_{37}	—	November 26, 2013	Mount Lemmon	Mount Lemmon Survey	EOS	1.7 km	MPC · JPL
566849	2018 VE_{38}	—	March 13, 2010	Mount Lemmon	Mount Lemmon Survey	·	3.1 km	MPC · JPL
566850	2018 VQ_{38}	—	March 20, 2015	Haleakala	Pan-STARRS 1	·	2.4 km	MPC · JPL
566851	2018 VZ_{38}	—	March 17, 2004	Kitt Peak	Spacewatch	·	2.5 km	MPC · JPL
566852	2018 VP_{39}	—	October 4, 2006	Mount Lemmon	Mount Lemmon Survey	·	2.6 km	MPC · JPL
566853	2018 VJ_{40}	—	December 22, 2008	Kitt Peak	Spacewatch	·	1.8 km	MPC · JPL
566854	2018 VO_{40}	—	November 10, 2013	Kitt Peak	Spacewatch	·	1.5 km	MPC · JPL
566855	2018 VO_{42}	—	October 24, 2009	Catalina	CSS	·	1.7 km	MPC · JPL
566856	2018 VR_{42}	—	September 19, 2011	Haleakala	Pan-STARRS 1	·	3.7 km	MPC · JPL
566857	2018 VS_{42}	—	September 13, 2013	Mount Lemmon	Mount Lemmon Survey	·	1.8 km	MPC · JPL
566858	2018 VC_{43}	—	September 14, 2007	Mount Lemmon	Mount Lemmon Survey	·	2.1 km	MPC · JPL
566859	2018 VF_{43}	—	November 1, 2013	Kitt Peak	Spacewatch	·	1.7 km	MPC · JPL
566860	2018 VU_{43}	—	March 27, 2012	Haleakala	Pan-STARRS 1	·	2.5 km	MPC · JPL
566861	2018 VV_{43}	—	November 12, 2007	Mount Lemmon	Mount Lemmon Survey	·	2.2 km	MPC · JPL
566862	2018 VY_{43}	—	April 9, 2013	Haleakala	Pan-STARRS 1	·	1.5 km	MPC · JPL
566863	2018 VB_{44}	—	December 31, 2002	Socorro	LINEAR	·	3.3 km	MPC · JPL
566864	2018 VV_{44}	—	October 17, 2012	Mount Lemmon	Mount Lemmon Survey	·	3.2 km	MPC · JPL
566865	2018 VE_{45}	—	October 16, 2007	Mount Lemmon	Mount Lemmon Survey	·	4.5 km	MPC · JPL
566866	2018 VK_{45}	—	June 25, 2017	Haleakala	Pan-STARRS 1	·	2.4 km	MPC · JPL
566867	2018 VS_{45}	—	January 2, 2012	Mount Lemmon	Mount Lemmon Survey	·	1.6 km	MPC · JPL
566868	2018 VA_{46}	—	December 4, 2008	Kitt Peak	Spacewatch	·	2.8 km	MPC · JPL
566869	2018 VB_{47}	—	November 17, 2007	Kitt Peak	Spacewatch	·	3.0 km	MPC · JPL
566870	2018 VE_{47}	—	September 9, 2008	Mount Lemmon	Mount Lemmon Survey	HOF	2.3 km	MPC · JPL
566871	2018 VE_{49}	—	October 8, 2012	Haleakala	Pan-STARRS 1	·	2.6 km	MPC · JPL
566872	2018 VH_{49}	—	November 10, 2009	Mount Lemmon	Mount Lemmon Survey	·	1.4 km	MPC · JPL
566873	2018 VQ_{49}	—	September 23, 2012	Mayhill-ISON	L. Elenin	·	2.6 km	MPC · JPL
566874	2018 VY_{49}	—	September 6, 2012	Mount Lemmon	Mount Lemmon Survey	·	2.2 km	MPC · JPL
566875	2018 VN_{50}	—	November 27, 2013	Haleakala	Pan-STARRS 1	·	2.4 km	MPC · JPL
566876	2018 VG_{51}	—	October 9, 2007	Kitt Peak	Spacewatch	(31811)	2.8 km	MPC · JPL
566877	2018 VH_{51}	—	January 21, 2015	Catalina	CSS	HOF	2.4 km	MPC · JPL
566878	2018 VN_{51}	—	September 6, 2013	Kitt Peak	Spacewatch	·	1.8 km	MPC · JPL
566879	2018 VD_{52}	—	June 11, 2005	Catalina	CSS	·	1.2 km	MPC · JPL
566880	2018 VL_{52}	—	December 9, 2004	Kitt Peak	Spacewatch	·	1.7 km	MPC · JPL
566881	2018 VD_{53}	—	September 30, 2009	Mount Lemmon	Mount Lemmon Survey	·	2.1 km	MPC · JPL
566882	2018 VF_{53}	—	May 7, 2010	Mount Lemmon	Mount Lemmon Survey	ELF	3.7 km	MPC · JPL
566883	2018 VG_{53}	—	September 15, 2007	Mount Lemmon	Mount Lemmon Survey	·	3.0 km	MPC · JPL
566884	2018 VD_{54}	—	October 20, 2007	Kitt Peak	Spacewatch	TIR	2.9 km	MPC · JPL
566885	2018 VT_{54}	—	October 22, 2008	Kitt Peak	Spacewatch	·	1.6 km	MPC · JPL
566886	2018 VS_{56}	—	October 20, 2008	Mount Lemmon	Mount Lemmon Survey	·	1.7 km	MPC · JPL
566887	2018 VK_{57}	—	October 8, 2012	Haleakala	Pan-STARRS 1	VER	1.9 km	MPC · JPL
566888	2018 VD_{58}	—	September 26, 2012	Mount Lemmon	Mount Lemmon Survey	LUT	3.6 km	MPC · JPL
566889	2018 VH_{58}	—	October 10, 2008	Mount Lemmon	Mount Lemmon Survey	·	1.9 km	MPC · JPL
566890	2018 VJ_{58}	—	July 18, 2013	Haleakala	Pan-STARRS 1	EOS	1.9 km	MPC · JPL
566891	2018 VZ_{58}	—	February 1, 2016	Haleakala	Pan-STARRS 1	·	1.2 km	MPC · JPL
566892	2018 VD_{59}	—	September 13, 2013	Kitt Peak	Spacewatch	·	1.5 km	MPC · JPL
566893	2018 VG_{59}	—	March 15, 2004	Socorro	LINEAR	·	3.8 km	MPC · JPL
566894	2018 VM_{59}	—	December 27, 2013	Oukaïmeden	C. Rinner	·	2.4 km	MPC · JPL
566895	2018 VB_{60}	—	November 2, 2013	Mount Lemmon	Mount Lemmon Survey	EOS	1.7 km	MPC · JPL
566896	2018 VP_{60}	—	October 2, 2013	Haleakala	Pan-STARRS 1	AGN	1.2 km	MPC · JPL
566897	2018 VQ_{60}	—	October 15, 2002	Palomar	NEAT	·	2.1 km	MPC · JPL
566898	2018 VX_{60}	—	November 10, 2013	Mount Lemmon	Mount Lemmon Survey	·	2.0 km	MPC · JPL
566899	2018 VF_{61}	—	October 24, 2009	Catalina	CSS	·	2.0 km	MPC · JPL
566900	2018 VV_{61}	—	November 15, 2007	Mount Lemmon	Mount Lemmon Survey	·	2.9 km	MPC · JPL

== 566901–567000 ==
back to top

Designation			Discovery			Properties		Ref
Permanent	Provisional	Named after	Date	Site	Discoverer(s)	Category	Diam.	Ref
566901	2018 VZ_{61}	—	October 23, 2006	Mount Lemmon	Mount Lemmon Survey	·	1.1 km	MPC · JPL
566902	2018 VJ_{62}	—	October 23, 2001	Palomar	NEAT	·	2.9 km	MPC · JPL
566903	2018 VN_{62}	—	June 21, 2017	Haleakala	Pan-STARRS 1	EOS	1.6 km	MPC · JPL
566904	2018 VR_{62}	—	August 26, 2012	Haleakala	Pan-STARRS 1	·	2.1 km	MPC · JPL
566905	2018 VA_{63}	—	December 30, 2008	Kitt Peak	Spacewatch	·	2.8 km	MPC · JPL
566906	2018 VG_{63}	—	January 3, 2009	Kitt Peak	Spacewatch	·	960 m	MPC · JPL
566907	2018 VL_{63}	—	August 23, 2008	Siding Spring	SSS	·	2.3 km	MPC · JPL
566908	2018 VP_{63}	—	September 23, 2001	Palomar	NEAT	TIR	3.6 km	MPC · JPL
566909	2018 VT_{64}	—	December 12, 2004	Kitt Peak	Spacewatch	·	2.7 km	MPC · JPL
566910	2018 VX_{64}	—	October 9, 2013	Mayhill-ISON	L. Elenin	·	1.9 km	MPC · JPL
566911	2018 VZ_{64}	—	February 17, 2015	Haleakala	Pan-STARRS 1	TIR	2.7 km	MPC · JPL
566912	2018 VB_{65}	—	April 15, 2016	Haleakala	Pan-STARRS 1	·	2.8 km	MPC · JPL
566913	2018 VU_{65}	—	November 8, 2007	Kitt Peak	Spacewatch	·	3.2 km	MPC · JPL
566914	2018 VM_{66}	—	August 25, 2006	Socorro	LINEAR	·	4.1 km	MPC · JPL
566915	2018 VV_{66}	—	November 27, 2013	Haleakala	Pan-STARRS 1	·	2.9 km	MPC · JPL
566916	2018 VZ_{66}	—	December 22, 2003	Kitt Peak	Spacewatch	EMA	2.2 km	MPC · JPL
566917	2018 VJ_{67}	—	January 23, 2015	Haleakala	Pan-STARRS 1	·	2.5 km	MPC · JPL
566918	2018 VH_{68}	—	November 9, 2007	Kitt Peak	Spacewatch	·	2.5 km	MPC · JPL
566919	2018 VJ_{68}	—	November 10, 2013	Kitt Peak	Spacewatch	EOS	1.8 km	MPC · JPL
566920	2018 VR_{68}	—	September 11, 2004	Kitt Peak	Spacewatch	·	1.3 km	MPC · JPL
566921	2018 VX_{68}	—	February 19, 2015	Haleakala	Pan-STARRS 1	·	3.1 km	MPC · JPL
566922	2018 VF_{69}	—	October 11, 2007	Catalina	CSS	·	2.5 km	MPC · JPL
566923	2018 VG_{71}	—	October 22, 2011	Mount Lemmon	Mount Lemmon Survey	SYL	3.6 km	MPC · JPL
566924	2018 VE_{72}	—	April 20, 2012	Kitt Peak	Spacewatch	MAR	950 m	MPC · JPL
566925	2018 VN_{72}	—	October 16, 2007	Mount Lemmon	Mount Lemmon Survey	·	2.7 km	MPC · JPL
566926	2018 VE_{73}	—	December 4, 2007	Kitt Peak	Spacewatch	·	2.9 km	MPC · JPL
566927	2018 VJ_{73}	—	October 23, 2012	Mount Lemmon	Mount Lemmon Survey	·	2.5 km	MPC · JPL
566928	2018 VO_{73}	—	December 8, 2012	Kitt Peak	Spacewatch	·	3.3 km	MPC · JPL
566929	2018 VV_{73}	—	January 20, 2009	Mount Lemmon	Mount Lemmon Survey	EOS	1.6 km	MPC · JPL
566930	2018 VE_{74}	—	September 10, 2007	Kitt Peak	Spacewatch	·	2.2 km	MPC · JPL
566931	2018 VR_{74}	—	August 25, 2012	Kitt Peak	Spacewatch	EOS	1.5 km	MPC · JPL
566932	2018 VF_{75}	—	June 7, 2013	Mount Lemmon	Mount Lemmon Survey	·	1.7 km	MPC · JPL
566933	2018 VH_{75}	—	April 18, 2015	Haleakala	Pan-STARRS 1	·	4.1 km	MPC · JPL
566934	2018 VT_{75}	—	July 25, 2001	Haleakala	NEAT	·	1.7 km	MPC · JPL
566935	2018 VH_{76}	—	August 6, 2012	Haleakala	Pan-STARRS 1	·	2.6 km	MPC · JPL
566936	2018 VK_{76}	—	October 11, 2012	Kitt Peak	Spacewatch	·	3.2 km	MPC · JPL
566937	2018 VT_{76}	—	September 18, 2001	Apache Point	SDSS Collaboration	·	2.2 km	MPC · JPL
566938	2018 VU_{76}	—	October 17, 2007	Mount Lemmon	Mount Lemmon Survey	·	2.4 km	MPC · JPL
566939 Petrucrăciun	2018 VW_{76}	Petrucrăciun	February 25, 2010	La Palma	EURONEAR	·	2.4 km	MPC · JPL
566940	2018 VY_{76}	—	November 20, 2008	Kitt Peak	Spacewatch	EOS	2.0 km	MPC · JPL
566941	2018 VE_{77}	—	November 20, 2008	Kitt Peak	Spacewatch	EOS	1.5 km	MPC · JPL
566942	2018 VJ_{77}	—	September 22, 2008	Mount Lemmon	Mount Lemmon Survey	·	1.8 km	MPC · JPL
566943	2018 VL_{77}	—	December 10, 2013	Mount Lemmon	Mount Lemmon Survey	·	2.7 km	MPC · JPL
566944	2018 VP_{77}	—	March 9, 2011	Kitt Peak	Spacewatch	·	1.9 km	MPC · JPL
566945	2018 VR_{77}	—	January 7, 2006	Mount Lemmon	Mount Lemmon Survey	·	1.4 km	MPC · JPL
566946	2018 VZ_{77}	—	October 10, 2007	Kitt Peak	Spacewatch	·	2.7 km	MPC · JPL
566947	2018 VM_{78}	—	October 8, 2007	Mount Lemmon	Mount Lemmon Survey	·	1.9 km	MPC · JPL
566948	2018 VR_{78}	—	January 22, 2015	Haleakala	Pan-STARRS 1	AGN	1 km	MPC · JPL
566949	2018 VW_{78}	—	November 19, 2007	Kitt Peak	Spacewatch	·	2.6 km	MPC · JPL
566950	2018 VX_{78}	—	November 7, 2012	Mount Lemmon	Mount Lemmon Survey	·	2.4 km	MPC · JPL
566951	2018 VE_{79}	—	July 4, 2005	Palomar	NEAT	(5)	1.2 km	MPC · JPL
566952	2018 VS_{79}	—	December 2, 2008	Kitt Peak	Spacewatch	·	2.3 km	MPC · JPL
566953	2018 VU_{79}	—	December 26, 2013	Haleakala	Pan-STARRS 1	VER	2.4 km	MPC · JPL
566954	2018 VP_{80}	—	April 15, 2007	Kitt Peak	Spacewatch	·	2.6 km	MPC · JPL
566955	2018 VY_{80}	—	May 2, 2016	Cerro Paranal	Altmann, M., Prusti, T.	·	2.8 km	MPC · JPL
566956	2018 VJ_{81}	—	February 16, 2015	Haleakala	Pan-STARRS 1	·	2.3 km	MPC · JPL
566957	2018 VM_{81}	—	November 1, 2008	Mount Lemmon	Mount Lemmon Survey	KOR	1.3 km	MPC · JPL
566958	2018 VQ_{81}	—	June 9, 2016	Cerro Tololo	Lister, T.	·	3.5 km	MPC · JPL
566959	2018 VY_{81}	—	January 21, 2015	Haleakala	Pan-STARRS 1	EOS	1.7 km	MPC · JPL
566960	2018 VE_{82}	—	December 21, 2008	Mount Lemmon	Mount Lemmon Survey	·	2.4 km	MPC · JPL
566961	2018 VP_{82}	—	October 2, 2013	Haleakala	Pan-STARRS 1	·	1.8 km	MPC · JPL
566962	2018 VJ_{83}	—	November 9, 2009	Kitt Peak	Spacewatch	·	2.5 km	MPC · JPL
566963	2018 VL_{83}	—	January 10, 2011	Mount Lemmon	Mount Lemmon Survey	·	2.0 km	MPC · JPL
566964	2018 VO_{83}	—	March 29, 2011	Piszkés-tető	K. Sárneczky, Z. Kuli	·	2.2 km	MPC · JPL
566965	2018 VQ_{83}	—	October 9, 2008	Catalina	CSS	·	2.5 km	MPC · JPL
566966	2018 VS_{83}	—	March 20, 2010	Mount Lemmon	Mount Lemmon Survey	·	3.0 km	MPC · JPL
566967	2018 VU_{83}	—	January 31, 2009	Mount Lemmon	Mount Lemmon Survey	·	2.7 km	MPC · JPL
566968	2018 VW_{83}	—	September 14, 2014	Haleakala	Pan-STARRS 1	·	2.5 km	MPC · JPL
566969	2018 VX_{83}	—	January 11, 2011	Kitt Peak	Spacewatch	·	2.7 km	MPC · JPL
566970	2018 VA_{84}	—	November 30, 2014	Haleakala	Pan-STARRS 1	·	1.5 km	MPC · JPL
566971	2018 VK_{84}	—	October 16, 2012	Mount Lemmon	Mount Lemmon Survey	·	2.5 km	MPC · JPL
566972	2018 VL_{84}	—	November 20, 2008	Kitt Peak	Spacewatch	·	1.8 km	MPC · JPL
566973	2018 VQ_{84}	—	December 18, 2009	Kitt Peak	Spacewatch	·	2.0 km	MPC · JPL
566974	2018 VV_{84}	—	October 12, 2004	Kitt Peak	Spacewatch	·	2.0 km	MPC · JPL
566975	2018 VG_{85}	—	June 6, 2013	Mount Lemmon	Mount Lemmon Survey	·	1.1 km	MPC · JPL
566976	2018 VQ_{85}	—	July 27, 2009	Kitt Peak	Spacewatch	ADE	1.9 km	MPC · JPL
566977	2018 VT_{85}	—	March 10, 2003	Kitt Peak	Spacewatch	·	3.0 km	MPC · JPL
566978	2018 VX_{85}	—	January 25, 2009	Kitt Peak	Spacewatch	·	2.4 km	MPC · JPL
566979	2018 VA_{86}	—	April 1, 2003	Apache Point	SDSS Collaboration	T_{j} (2.98) · EUP	2.9 km	MPC · JPL
566980	2018 VC_{86}	—	August 17, 2009	Kitt Peak	Spacewatch	JUN	990 m	MPC · JPL
566981	2018 VN_{86}	—	June 25, 2017	Haleakala	Pan-STARRS 1	·	2.4 km	MPC · JPL
566982	2018 VE_{87}	—	March 17, 2016	Haleakala	Pan-STARRS 1	·	2.8 km	MPC · JPL
566983	2018 VG_{87}	—	October 24, 2011	Haleakala	Pan-STARRS 1	V	560 m	MPC · JPL
566984	2018 VJ_{87}	—	November 15, 2007	Mount Lemmon	Mount Lemmon Survey	VER	2.6 km	MPC · JPL
566985	2018 VT_{87}	—	April 15, 2012	Haleakala	Pan-STARRS 1	·	1.5 km	MPC · JPL
566986 Štepka	2018 VX_{87}	Štepka	October 31, 2013	Piszkés-tető	K. Sárneczky, S. Kürti	·	1.8 km	MPC · JPL
566987	2018 VF_{88}	—	September 9, 2013	Haleakala	Pan-STARRS 1	·	1.9 km	MPC · JPL
566988	2018 VN_{88}	—	November 2, 2013	Mount Lemmon	Mount Lemmon Survey	EOS	1.6 km	MPC · JPL
566989	2018 VV_{88}	—	February 10, 2011	Mount Lemmon	Mount Lemmon Survey	AGN	1 km	MPC · JPL
566990	2018 VE_{89}	—	October 13, 2006	Kitt Peak	Spacewatch	·	920 m	MPC · JPL
566991	2018 VA_{92}	—	September 21, 2003	Kitt Peak	Spacewatch	·	1.7 km	MPC · JPL
566992	2018 VC_{92}	—	February 23, 2015	Haleakala	Pan-STARRS 1	·	2.4 km	MPC · JPL
566993	2018 VS_{92}	—	August 16, 2001	Palomar	NEAT	·	2.7 km	MPC · JPL
566994	2018 VF_{94}	—	November 20, 2009	Kitt Peak	Spacewatch	·	1.7 km	MPC · JPL
566995	2018 VF_{95}	—	December 10, 2009	Mount Lemmon	Mount Lemmon Survey	HOF	2.4 km	MPC · JPL
566996	2018 VY_{96}	—	September 14, 2013	Haleakala	Pan-STARRS 1	·	1.8 km	MPC · JPL
566997	2018 VT_{97}	—	November 24, 2009	Kitt Peak	Spacewatch	·	1.9 km	MPC · JPL
566998	2018 VG_{98}	—	November 3, 2007	Kitt Peak	Spacewatch	·	2.5 km	MPC · JPL
566999	2018 VM_{98}	—	October 26, 2006	Mauna Kea	P. A. Wiegert	·	900 m	MPC · JPL
567000	2018 VE_{100}	—	August 14, 2013	Haleakala	Pan-STARRS 1	·	1.8 km	MPC · JPL

back to top

== Meaning of names ==
As minor planet discoveries are confirmed, they are given a permanent number by the IAU's Minor Planet Center (MPC), and the discoverers can then submit names for them, following the IAU's naming conventions. The list below concerns those minor planets in the specified number-range that have received names, and explains the meanings of those names.

Official naming citations of newly named small Solar System bodies are approved and published in a bulletin by IAU's Working Group for Small Bodies Nomenclature (WGSBN). Before May 2021, citations were published in MPC's Minor Planet Circulars for many decades. Recent citations can also be found on the JPL Small-Body Database (SBDB). Until his death in 2016, German astronomer Lutz D. Schmadel compiled these citations into the Dictionary of Minor Planet Names (DMP) and regularly updated the collection.

Based on Paul Herget's The Names of the Minor Planets, Schmadel also researched the unclear origin of numerous asteroids, most of which had been named prior to World War II. This article incorporates text from this source, which is in the public domain: SBDB New namings may only be added to this list below after official publication as the preannouncement of names is condemned. The WGSBN publishes a comprehensive guideline for the naming rules of non-cometary small Solar System bodies.

Named minor planet	Provisional	This minor planet was named for...	Ref · Catalog
566277 Sharonchan	2017 RN_{76}	Sharon Chan, Canadian astrophysics student at the University of British Columbia and a telescope operator for the UBC Southern (Thunderbird) Observatory located in Chile.	IAU · 566277
566631 Svábhegy	2018 SH_{6}	Svábhegy is a part of the 12th district of Budapest. The Konkoly Observatory was built here in the 1920s, which was mostly referred to as the Svábhegy Observatory before the Second World War.	IAU · 566631
566939 Petrucrăciun	2018 VW_{76}	Petru Crăciun, physics teacher and manager of education at the Suceava County School Inspectorate, Romania.	IAU · 566939
566986 Štepka	2018 VX_{87}	Stanislav Štepka, Slovak playwright, actor, and founder of the Radošina Naive Theatre.	IAU · 566939
