= List of minor planets: 435001–436000 =

The following is a partial list of minor planets, running from minor-planet number 435001 through 436000, inclusive. The primary data for this and other partial lists is based on JPL's "Small-Body Orbital Elements" and data available from the Minor Planet Center. Critical list information is also provided by the MPC, unless otherwise specified from Lowell Observatory. A detailed description of the table's columns and additional sources are given on the main page including a complete list of every page in this series, and a statistical break-up on the dynamical classification of minor planets.

Also see the summary list of all named bodies in numerical and alphabetical order, and the corresponding naming citations for the number range of this particular list. New namings may only be added to this list after official publication, as the preannouncement of names is condemned by the Working Group for Small Bodies Nomenclature of the International Astronomical Union.

Near-Earth obj.	MBA (inner)	MBA (outer)	Centaur
Mars-crosser	MBA (middle)	Jupiter trojan	Trans-Neptunian obj.
Unclassified

== 435001–435100 ==
Designation			Discovery			Properties		Ref
Permanent	Provisional	Named after	Date	Site	Discoverer(s)	Category	Diam.	Ref
435001	2006 UQ_{256}	—	October 28, 2006	Kitt Peak	Spacewatch	·	510 m	MPC · JPL
435002	2006 UD_{283}	—	September 27, 2006	Mount Lemmon	Mount Lemmon Survey	NYS	730 m	MPC · JPL
435003	2006 UG_{289}	—	October 31, 2006	Kitt Peak	Spacewatch	·	990 m	MPC · JPL
435004	2006 UC_{322}	—	October 16, 2006	Kitt Peak	Spacewatch	·	720 m	MPC · JPL
435005	2006 UX_{330}	—	October 16, 2006	Apache Point	A. C. Becker	EOS	1.9 km	MPC · JPL
435006	2006 UF_{331}	—	October 16, 2006	Apache Point	SDSS Collaboration	·	2.6 km	MPC · JPL
435007	2006 UE_{346}	—	October 19, 2006	Kitt Peak	Spacewatch	·	690 m	MPC · JPL
435008	2006 VU_{15}	—	November 9, 2006	Kitt Peak	Spacewatch	HYG	3.0 km	MPC · JPL
435009	2006 VM_{17}	—	October 21, 2006	Kitt Peak	Spacewatch	·	3.0 km	MPC · JPL
435010	2006 VO_{19}	—	October 21, 2006	Kitt Peak	Spacewatch	·	3.0 km	MPC · JPL
435011	2006 VW_{30}	—	October 20, 2006	Mount Lemmon	Mount Lemmon Survey	EOS	2.4 km	MPC · JPL
435012	2006 VA_{33}	—	September 26, 2006	Mount Lemmon	Mount Lemmon Survey	·	790 m	MPC · JPL
435013	2006 VD_{37}	—	November 11, 2006	Catalina	CSS	PHO	1.2 km	MPC · JPL
435014	2006 VA_{46}	—	November 9, 2006	Kitt Peak	Spacewatch	VER	2.5 km	MPC · JPL
435015	2006 VA_{53}	—	November 11, 2006	Kitt Peak	Spacewatch	·	4.3 km	MPC · JPL
435016	2006 VT_{56}	—	November 11, 2006	Kitt Peak	Spacewatch	·	820 m	MPC · JPL
435017	2006 VE_{59}	—	October 23, 2006	Mount Lemmon	Mount Lemmon Survey	·	2.9 km	MPC · JPL
435018	2006 VK_{65}	—	October 16, 2006	Catalina	CSS	·	720 m	MPC · JPL
435019	2006 VT_{69}	—	November 11, 2006	Kitt Peak	Spacewatch	·	4.2 km	MPC · JPL
435020	2006 VH_{70}	—	November 11, 2006	Kitt Peak	Spacewatch	·	4.0 km	MPC · JPL
435021	2006 VH_{72}	—	November 11, 2006	Mount Lemmon	Mount Lemmon Survey	·	720 m	MPC · JPL
435022	2006 VR_{74}	—	November 11, 2006	Mount Lemmon	Mount Lemmon Survey	·	560 m	MPC · JPL
435023	2006 VV_{74}	—	November 11, 2006	Mount Lemmon	Mount Lemmon Survey	·	3.5 km	MPC · JPL
435024	2006 VF_{83}	—	September 28, 2006	Mount Lemmon	Mount Lemmon Survey	·	3.7 km	MPC · JPL
435025	2006 VH_{90}	—	October 19, 2006	Kitt Peak	Spacewatch	·	760 m	MPC · JPL
435026	2006 VB_{98}	—	October 21, 2006	Mount Lemmon	Mount Lemmon Survey	·	2.9 km	MPC · JPL
435027	2006 VZ_{102}	—	November 12, 2006	Mount Lemmon	Mount Lemmon Survey	·	800 m	MPC · JPL
435028	2006 VK_{107}	—	September 30, 2006	Mount Lemmon	Mount Lemmon Survey	·	980 m	MPC · JPL
435029	2006 VN_{107}	—	September 27, 2006	Mount Lemmon	Mount Lemmon Survey	·	3.1 km	MPC · JPL
435030	2006 VD_{120}	—	November 14, 2006	Kitt Peak	Spacewatch	·	3.4 km	MPC · JPL
435031	2006 VQ_{124}	—	November 14, 2006	Kitt Peak	Spacewatch	·	2.5 km	MPC · JPL
435032	2006 VV_{125}	—	October 27, 2006	Catalina	CSS	·	3.8 km	MPC · JPL
435033	2006 VG_{127}	—	October 20, 2006	Mount Lemmon	Mount Lemmon Survey	·	3.3 km	MPC · JPL
435034	2006 VQ_{141}	—	November 13, 2006	Kitt Peak	Spacewatch	·	4.1 km	MPC · JPL
435035	2006 VF_{152}	—	September 25, 2006	Mount Lemmon	Mount Lemmon Survey	·	730 m	MPC · JPL
435036	2006 VX_{170}	—	November 2, 2006	Mount Lemmon	Mount Lemmon Survey	·	4.5 km	MPC · JPL
435037	2006 WQ_{6}	—	November 16, 2006	Kitt Peak	Spacewatch	·	3.0 km	MPC · JPL
435038	2006 WX_{33}	—	October 23, 2006	Mount Lemmon	Mount Lemmon Survey	·	3.3 km	MPC · JPL
435039	2006 WT_{35}	—	November 15, 2006	Catalina	CSS	·	890 m	MPC · JPL
435040	2006 WP_{45}	—	October 2, 2006	Mount Lemmon	Mount Lemmon Survey	·	2.2 km	MPC · JPL
435041	2006 WQ_{45}	—	September 30, 2006	Mount Lemmon	Mount Lemmon Survey	·	2.7 km	MPC · JPL
435042	2006 WD_{53}	—	November 16, 2006	Catalina	CSS	·	4.6 km	MPC · JPL
435043	2006 WY_{54}	—	November 16, 2006	Kitt Peak	Spacewatch	·	810 m	MPC · JPL
435044	2006 WK_{55}	—	November 10, 2006	Kitt Peak	Spacewatch	·	3.6 km	MPC · JPL
435045	2006 WR_{61}	—	October 21, 2006	Kitt Peak	Spacewatch	·	1.1 km	MPC · JPL
435046	2006 WX_{64}	—	November 17, 2006	Mount Lemmon	Mount Lemmon Survey	·	4.5 km	MPC · JPL
435047	2006 WT_{67}	—	November 17, 2006	Kitt Peak	Spacewatch	·	690 m	MPC · JPL
435048	2006 WS_{78}	—	September 27, 2006	Mount Lemmon	Mount Lemmon Survey	·	900 m	MPC · JPL
435049	2006 WU_{79}	—	November 18, 2006	Kitt Peak	Spacewatch	·	670 m	MPC · JPL
435050	2006 WA_{81}	—	November 18, 2006	Kitt Peak	Spacewatch	·	740 m	MPC · JPL
435051	2006 WV_{89}	—	November 18, 2006	Kitt Peak	Spacewatch	·	2.7 km	MPC · JPL
435052	2006 WW_{97}	—	November 11, 2006	Mount Lemmon	Mount Lemmon Survey	·	850 m	MPC · JPL
435053	2006 WH_{99}	—	September 27, 2006	Mount Lemmon	Mount Lemmon Survey	·	3.3 km	MPC · JPL
435054	2006 WZ_{137}	—	November 19, 2006	Kitt Peak	Spacewatch	·	2.1 km	MPC · JPL
435055	2006 WX_{139}	—	November 11, 2006	Kitt Peak	Spacewatch	·	2.7 km	MPC · JPL
435056	2006 WC_{148}	—	November 20, 2006	Kitt Peak	Spacewatch	·	790 m	MPC · JPL
435057	2006 WX_{184}	—	November 17, 2006	Kitt Peak	Spacewatch	·	880 m	MPC · JPL
435058	2006 XG_{2}	—	December 12, 2006	Kitt Peak	Spacewatch	AMO	320 m	MPC · JPL
435059	2006 XE_{28}	—	December 13, 2006	Kitt Peak	Spacewatch	·	1.1 km	MPC · JPL
435060	2006 XB_{33}	—	November 16, 2006	Kitt Peak	Spacewatch	·	1.2 km	MPC · JPL
435061	2006 XU_{58}	—	December 1, 2006	Mount Lemmon	Mount Lemmon Survey	MAS	680 m	MPC · JPL
435062	2006 XK_{70}	—	December 14, 2006	Kitt Peak	Spacewatch	·	1.2 km	MPC · JPL
435063	2006 XD_{71}	—	December 14, 2006	Mount Lemmon	Mount Lemmon Survey	·	1.3 km	MPC · JPL
435064	2006 YJ	—	December 17, 2006	Mount Lemmon	Mount Lemmon Survey	H	500 m	MPC · JPL
435065	2006 YO_{8}	—	November 1, 2006	Mount Lemmon	Mount Lemmon Survey	·	1.4 km	MPC · JPL
435066	2006 YQ_{12}	—	December 16, 2006	Kitt Peak	Spacewatch	·	1.0 km	MPC · JPL
435067	2006 YN_{34}	—	December 13, 2006	Kitt Peak	Spacewatch	·	1.1 km	MPC · JPL
435068	2006 YF_{43}	—	December 24, 2006	Kitt Peak	Spacewatch	V	620 m	MPC · JPL
435069	2006 YR_{54}	—	December 27, 2006	Mount Lemmon	Mount Lemmon Survey	·	1.1 km	MPC · JPL
435070	2007 AW_{13}	—	December 27, 2006	Kitt Peak	Spacewatch	·	1.1 km	MPC · JPL
435071	2007 AG_{28}	—	January 9, 2007	Kitt Peak	Spacewatch	·	1.2 km	MPC · JPL
435072	2007 AK_{28}	—	January 9, 2007	Kitt Peak	Spacewatch	·	1.3 km	MPC · JPL
435073	2007 AG_{30}	—	January 10, 2007	Mount Lemmon	Mount Lemmon Survey	·	890 m	MPC · JPL
435074	2007 BK_{3}	—	November 18, 2006	Mount Lemmon	Mount Lemmon Survey	·	980 m	MPC · JPL
435075	2007 BT_{12}	—	January 17, 2007	Kitt Peak	Spacewatch	·	1.5 km	MPC · JPL
435076	2007 BD_{13}	—	November 16, 2006	Mount Lemmon	Mount Lemmon Survey	V	680 m	MPC · JPL
435077	2007 BO_{13}	—	November 3, 2005	Kitt Peak	Spacewatch	NYS	1.1 km	MPC · JPL
435078	2007 BU_{15}	—	January 17, 2007	Kitt Peak	Spacewatch	·	2.4 km	MPC · JPL
435079	2007 BV_{21}	—	January 24, 2007	Socorro	LINEAR	·	1.3 km	MPC · JPL
435080	2007 BW_{42}	—	January 24, 2007	Mount Lemmon	Mount Lemmon Survey	MAS	560 m	MPC · JPL
435081	2007 BV_{48}	—	January 26, 2007	Kitt Peak	Spacewatch	NYS	890 m	MPC · JPL
435082	2007 BO_{61}	—	November 18, 2006	Mount Lemmon	Mount Lemmon Survey	·	1.4 km	MPC · JPL
435083	2007 BP_{80}	—	January 24, 2007	Catalina	CSS	V	690 m	MPC · JPL
435084	2007 BV_{99}	—	January 17, 2007	Kitt Peak	Spacewatch	·	1.2 km	MPC · JPL
435085	2007 BU_{100}	—	January 27, 2007	Mount Lemmon	Mount Lemmon Survey	V	630 m	MPC · JPL
435086	2007 CC_{12}	—	February 6, 2007	Kitt Peak	Spacewatch	·	1.3 km	MPC · JPL
435087	2007 CR_{16}	—	January 27, 2007	Mount Lemmon	Mount Lemmon Survey	·	1.1 km	MPC · JPL
435088	2007 CU_{17}	—	February 8, 2007	Mount Lemmon	Mount Lemmon Survey	NYS	1.3 km	MPC · JPL
435089	2007 CJ_{28}	—	January 27, 2007	Kitt Peak	Spacewatch	·	900 m	MPC · JPL
435090	2007 CQ_{28}	—	January 9, 2007	Mount Lemmon	Mount Lemmon Survey	·	850 m	MPC · JPL
435091	2007 CT_{36}	—	January 27, 2007	Kitt Peak	Spacewatch	·	1.1 km	MPC · JPL
435092	2007 CF_{38}	—	January 27, 2007	Mount Lemmon	Mount Lemmon Survey	·	1.1 km	MPC · JPL
435093	2007 CK_{42}	—	February 7, 2007	Mount Lemmon	Mount Lemmon Survey	·	1.5 km	MPC · JPL
435094	2007 CZ_{42}	—	January 27, 2007	Mount Lemmon	Mount Lemmon Survey	NYS	1.0 km	MPC · JPL
435095	2007 CB_{44}	—	January 10, 2007	Mount Lemmon	Mount Lemmon Survey	V	720 m	MPC · JPL
435096	2007 CQ_{51}	—	January 29, 2007	Kitt Peak	Spacewatch	·	1.1 km	MPC · JPL
435097	2007 CV_{51}	—	January 17, 2007	Catalina	CSS	·	1.6 km	MPC · JPL
435098	2007 CU_{58}	—	February 10, 2007	Catalina	CSS	·	1.5 km	MPC · JPL
435099	2007 CL_{64}	—	February 8, 2007	Mount Lemmon	Mount Lemmon Survey	·	1.2 km	MPC · JPL
435100	2007 DZ_{4}	—	February 17, 2007	Kitt Peak	Spacewatch	·	1.1 km	MPC · JPL

== 435101–435200 ==
back to top

Designation			Discovery			Properties		Ref
Permanent	Provisional	Named after	Date	Site	Discoverer(s)	Category	Diam.	Ref
435101	2007 DQ_{17}	—	January 28, 2007	Mount Lemmon	Mount Lemmon Survey	·	1.3 km	MPC · JPL
435102	2007 DK_{24}	—	February 17, 2007	Kitt Peak	Spacewatch	NYS	960 m	MPC · JPL
435103	2007 DH_{26}	—	January 28, 2007	Mount Lemmon	Mount Lemmon Survey	NYS	1.0 km	MPC · JPL
435104	2007 DR_{26}	—	February 17, 2007	Kitt Peak	Spacewatch	·	1.1 km	MPC · JPL
435105	2007 DP_{28}	—	February 17, 2007	Kitt Peak	Spacewatch	·	1.5 km	MPC · JPL
435106	2007 DQ_{35}	—	January 15, 2007	Mount Lemmon	Mount Lemmon Survey	·	980 m	MPC · JPL
435107	2007 DY_{35}	—	February 17, 2007	Kitt Peak	Spacewatch	NYS	1.2 km	MPC · JPL
435108	2007 DS_{40}	—	February 18, 2007	Calvin-Rehoboth	Calvin College	MAS	580 m	MPC · JPL
435109	2007 DA_{49}	—	February 21, 2007	Mount Lemmon	Mount Lemmon Survey	MAS	710 m	MPC · JPL
435110	2007 DR_{67}	—	February 21, 2007	Kitt Peak	Spacewatch	NYS	910 m	MPC · JPL
435111	2007 DQ_{68}	—	February 21, 2007	Kitt Peak	Spacewatch	·	1.1 km	MPC · JPL
435112	2007 DH_{70}	—	February 21, 2007	Kitt Peak	Spacewatch	3:2	3.7 km	MPC · JPL
435113	2007 DX_{71}	—	February 21, 2007	Kitt Peak	Spacewatch	MAS	620 m	MPC · JPL
435114	2007 DH_{78}	—	February 13, 2007	Mount Lemmon	Mount Lemmon Survey	MAS	740 m	MPC · JPL
435115	2007 DF_{84}	—	February 25, 2007	Kitt Peak	Spacewatch	·	1.1 km	MPC · JPL
435116	2007 DK_{86}	—	January 17, 2007	Kitt Peak	Spacewatch	MAS	740 m	MPC · JPL
435117	2007 DV_{95}	—	February 23, 2007	Kitt Peak	Spacewatch	·	1.3 km	MPC · JPL
435118	2007 DA_{99}	—	December 20, 2006	Mount Lemmon	Mount Lemmon Survey	·	980 m	MPC · JPL
435119	2007 DR_{102}	—	February 16, 2007	Catalina	CSS	H	760 m	MPC · JPL
435120	2007 DF_{111}	—	February 23, 2007	Mount Lemmon	Mount Lemmon Survey	·	970 m	MPC · JPL
435121	2007 EQ_{10}	—	January 27, 2007	Mount Lemmon	Mount Lemmon Survey	·	1.7 km	MPC · JPL
435122	2007 EP_{13}	—	January 27, 2007	Mount Lemmon	Mount Lemmon Survey	·	1.4 km	MPC · JPL
435123	2007 EN_{29}	—	March 9, 2007	Mount Lemmon	Mount Lemmon Survey	NYS	1.1 km	MPC · JPL
435124	2007 EC_{52}	—	February 27, 2007	Kitt Peak	Spacewatch	·	1.1 km	MPC · JPL
435125	2007 EG_{66}	—	February 25, 2007	Mount Lemmon	Mount Lemmon Survey	·	970 m	MPC · JPL
435126	2007 EX_{68}	—	March 10, 2007	Kitt Peak	Spacewatch	·	890 m	MPC · JPL
435127 Virtelpro	2007 EE_{88}	Virtelpro	March 14, 2007	Ceccano	G. Masi	H	480 m	MPC · JPL
435128	2007 EY_{104}	—	March 11, 2007	Mount Lemmon	Mount Lemmon Survey	NYS	1.2 km	MPC · JPL
435129	2007 ED_{123}	—	April 7, 2003	Kitt Peak	Spacewatch	·	1.1 km	MPC · JPL
435130	2007 EU_{130}	—	March 9, 2007	Mount Lemmon	Mount Lemmon Survey	·	1.5 km	MPC · JPL
435131	2007 EH_{146}	—	February 26, 2007	Mount Lemmon	Mount Lemmon Survey	MAS	770 m	MPC · JPL
435132	2007 EF_{150}	—	March 12, 2007	Mount Lemmon	Mount Lemmon Survey	·	1.5 km	MPC · JPL
435133	2007 FD_{6}	—	February 26, 2007	Mount Lemmon	Mount Lemmon Survey	·	890 m	MPC · JPL
435134	2007 FT_{35}	—	March 26, 2007	Mount Lemmon	Mount Lemmon Survey	H	450 m	MPC · JPL
435135	2007 GB_{16}	—	April 11, 2007	Kitt Peak	Spacewatch	·	1.6 km	MPC · JPL
435136	2007 GY_{19}	—	April 11, 2007	Kitt Peak	Spacewatch	NYS	1.2 km	MPC · JPL
435137	2007 GH_{23}	—	March 13, 2007	Mount Lemmon	Mount Lemmon Survey	KON	2.1 km	MPC · JPL
435138	2007 GD_{49}	—	April 14, 2007	Kitt Peak	Spacewatch	AMO +1km	1.5 km	MPC · JPL
435139	2007 GR_{59}	—	April 15, 2007	Kitt Peak	Spacewatch	·	1.4 km	MPC · JPL
435140	2007 GC_{62}	—	April 15, 2007	Kitt Peak	Spacewatch	T_{j} (2.98) · 3:2	5.5 km	MPC · JPL
435141	2007 GH_{77}	—	April 14, 2007	Kitt Peak	Spacewatch	·	900 m	MPC · JPL
435142	2007 HC_{24}	—	April 18, 2007	Kitt Peak	Spacewatch	·	950 m	MPC · JPL
435143	2007 HF_{38}	—	April 20, 2007	Kitt Peak	Spacewatch	·	1.0 km	MPC · JPL
435144	2007 HA_{48}	—	April 20, 2007	Kitt Peak	Spacewatch	H	590 m	MPC · JPL
435145	2007 HQ_{51}	—	April 20, 2007	Kitt Peak	Spacewatch	·	1.9 km	MPC · JPL
435146	2007 HJ_{55}	—	April 22, 2007	Kitt Peak	Spacewatch	H	600 m	MPC · JPL
435147	2007 HQ_{62}	—	April 22, 2007	Mount Lemmon	Mount Lemmon Survey	H	480 m	MPC · JPL
435148	2007 HD_{75}	—	April 22, 2007	Kitt Peak	Spacewatch	·	1.5 km	MPC · JPL
435149	2007 HX_{75}	—	April 22, 2007	Kitt Peak	Spacewatch	·	1.0 km	MPC · JPL
435150	2007 JK_{26}	—	May 9, 2007	Kitt Peak	Spacewatch	·	1.0 km	MPC · JPL
435151	2007 JM_{29}	—	April 22, 2007	Mount Lemmon	Mount Lemmon Survey	·	1.1 km	MPC · JPL
435152	2007 JP_{37}	—	March 25, 2007	Mount Lemmon	Mount Lemmon Survey	·	1.5 km	MPC · JPL
435153	2007 JH_{40}	—	April 19, 2007	Mount Lemmon	Mount Lemmon Survey	·	1.3 km	MPC · JPL
435154	2007 JC_{42}	—	April 25, 2007	Catalina	CSS	·	3.1 km	MPC · JPL
435155	2007 LN	—	May 26, 2007	Catalina	CSS	·	1.6 km	MPC · JPL
435156	2007 LJ_{4}	—	May 12, 2007	Mount Lemmon	Mount Lemmon Survey	EUN	1.4 km	MPC · JPL
435157	2007 LT_{6}	—	May 13, 2007	Kitt Peak	Spacewatch	·	1.3 km	MPC · JPL
435158	2007 LM_{14}	—	May 26, 2007	Mount Lemmon	Mount Lemmon Survey	·	1.5 km	MPC · JPL
435159	2007 LQ_{19}	—	June 13, 2007	Siding Spring	SSS	APO +1km · PHA	1.3 km	MPC · JPL
435160	2007 MX_{7}	—	June 18, 2007	Kitt Peak	Spacewatch	·	1.4 km	MPC · JPL
435161	2007 NV_{2}	—	July 14, 2007	Vallemare Borbona	V. S. Casulli	·	2.4 km	MPC · JPL
435162	2007 NM_{3}	—	June 21, 2007	Mount Lemmon	Mount Lemmon Survey	EUN	1.3 km	MPC · JPL
435163	2007 OJ	—	July 17, 2007	La Sagra	OAM	·	1.1 km	MPC · JPL
435164	2007 OQ_{1}	—	July 18, 2007	Črni Vrh	Skvarč, J.	·	1.7 km	MPC · JPL
435165	2007 PE_{12}	—	August 11, 2007	Socorro	LINEAR	·	2.0 km	MPC · JPL
435166	2007 PO_{15}	—	August 8, 2007	Socorro	LINEAR	JUN	1.2 km	MPC · JPL
435167	2007 PS_{20}	—	August 9, 2007	Socorro	LINEAR	·	1.8 km	MPC · JPL
435168	2007 PD_{30}	—	August 11, 2007	Socorro	LINEAR	·	1.5 km	MPC · JPL
435169	2007 PQ_{34}	—	August 9, 2007	Socorro	LINEAR	·	1.4 km	MPC · JPL
435170	2007 PZ_{35}	—	August 12, 2007	Socorro	LINEAR	·	1.7 km	MPC · JPL
435171	2007 PU_{37}	—	August 13, 2007	Socorro	LINEAR	·	2.7 km	MPC · JPL
435172	2007 PL_{46}	—	August 10, 2007	Kitt Peak	Spacewatch	·	1.3 km	MPC · JPL
435173	2007 QN_{1}	—	August 16, 2007	Socorro	LINEAR	·	1.9 km	MPC · JPL
435174	2007 QH_{7}	—	August 21, 2007	Anderson Mesa	LONEOS	·	1.7 km	MPC · JPL
435175	2007 QM_{14}	—	January 18, 2004	Kitt Peak	Spacewatch	·	3.4 km	MPC · JPL
435176	2007 RE_{7}	—	September 6, 2007	Dauban	C. Rinner, F. Kugel	·	2.3 km	MPC · JPL
435177	2007 RV_{7}	—	September 5, 2007	Costitx	OAM	·	1.6 km	MPC · JPL
435178	2007 RM_{8}	—	September 8, 2007	Eskridge	G. Hug	·	1.7 km	MPC · JPL
435179	2007 RA_{10}	—	September 2, 2007	Catalina	CSS	·	1.8 km	MPC · JPL
435180	2007 RS_{10}	—	August 18, 2007	XuYi	PMO NEO Survey Program	·	2.1 km	MPC · JPL
435181	2007 RO_{11}	—	September 10, 2007	Dauban	Chante-Perdrix	MRX	950 m	MPC · JPL
435182	2007 RF_{13}	—	September 3, 2007	Catalina	CSS	·	2.6 km	MPC · JPL
435183	2007 RR_{20}	—	September 3, 2007	Catalina	CSS	·	1.7 km	MPC · JPL
435184	2007 RP_{27}	—	September 4, 2007	Mount Lemmon	Mount Lemmon Survey	·	1.8 km	MPC · JPL
435185	2007 RU_{30}	—	September 5, 2007	Catalina	CSS	·	1.3 km	MPC · JPL
435186 Jovellanos	2007 RJ_{35}	Jovellanos	September 7, 2007	La Cañada	Lacruz, J.	·	1.6 km	MPC · JPL
435187	2007 RG_{46}	—	September 9, 2007	Kitt Peak	Spacewatch	·	2.0 km	MPC · JPL
435188	2007 RT_{60}	—	September 10, 2007	Catalina	CSS	·	1.7 km	MPC · JPL
435189	2007 RN_{68}	—	September 10, 2007	Kitt Peak	Spacewatch	·	1.7 km	MPC · JPL
435190	2007 RY_{70}	—	September 10, 2007	Kitt Peak	Spacewatch	·	3.0 km	MPC · JPL
435191	2007 RO_{73}	—	September 10, 2007	Mount Lemmon	Mount Lemmon Survey	EUN	1.3 km	MPC · JPL
435192	2007 RQ_{79}	—	September 10, 2007	Mount Lemmon	Mount Lemmon Survey	·	970 m	MPC · JPL
435193	2007 RW_{83}	—	September 10, 2007	Kitt Peak	Spacewatch	DOR	2.5 km	MPC · JPL
435194	2007 RU_{99}	—	September 8, 2007	Anderson Mesa	LONEOS	GEF	1.4 km	MPC · JPL
435195	2007 RB_{107}	—	September 11, 2007	Mount Lemmon	Mount Lemmon Survey	·	1.5 km	MPC · JPL
435196	2007 RW_{111}	—	September 11, 2007	Kitt Peak	Spacewatch	·	1.8 km	MPC · JPL
435197	2007 RS_{118}	—	September 11, 2007	Mount Lemmon	Mount Lemmon Survey	·	2.4 km	MPC · JPL
435198	2007 RU_{123}	—	September 12, 2007	Catalina	CSS	EUN	1.1 km	MPC · JPL
435199	2007 RR_{132}	—	September 11, 2007	Marly	P. Kocher	BRA	1.8 km	MPC · JPL
435200	2007 RQ_{134}	—	September 12, 2007	Anderson Mesa	LONEOS	EUN	1.6 km	MPC · JPL

== 435201–435300 ==
back to top

Designation			Discovery			Properties		Ref
Permanent	Provisional	Named after	Date	Site	Discoverer(s)	Category	Diam.	Ref
435201	2007 RM_{151}	—	September 10, 2007	Kitt Peak	Spacewatch	·	1.5 km	MPC · JPL
435202	2007 RC_{168}	—	September 10, 2007	Kitt Peak	Spacewatch	KOR	1.1 km	MPC · JPL
435203	2007 RC_{175}	—	September 10, 2007	Kitt Peak	Spacewatch	·	1.9 km	MPC · JPL
435204	2007 RG_{181}	—	September 11, 2007	Mount Lemmon	Mount Lemmon Survey	AGN	1.3 km	MPC · JPL
435205	2007 RE_{188}	—	September 9, 2007	Kitt Peak	Spacewatch	·	1.7 km	MPC · JPL
435206	2007 RV_{203}	—	September 8, 2007	Anderson Mesa	LONEOS	ADE	1.9 km	MPC · JPL
435207	2007 RJ_{205}	—	September 9, 2007	Kitt Peak	Spacewatch	·	2.2 km	MPC · JPL
435208	2007 RD_{213}	—	September 12, 2007	Anderson Mesa	LONEOS	·	3.1 km	MPC · JPL
435209	2007 RP_{220}	—	September 14, 2007	Mount Lemmon	Mount Lemmon Survey	·	1.7 km	MPC · JPL
435210	2007 RC_{223}	—	September 11, 2007	Mount Lemmon	Mount Lemmon Survey	·	2.1 km	MPC · JPL
435211	2007 RN_{224}	—	September 10, 2007	Kitt Peak	Spacewatch	AEO	1.6 km	MPC · JPL
435212	2007 RS_{226}	—	September 10, 2007	Kitt Peak	Spacewatch	·	1.7 km	MPC · JPL
435213	2007 RG_{239}	—	September 14, 2007	Catalina	CSS	·	2.0 km	MPC · JPL
435214	2007 RV_{239}	—	September 14, 2007	Catalina	CSS	·	2.1 km	MPC · JPL
435215	2007 RW_{242}	—	September 15, 2007	Socorro	LINEAR	·	1.8 km	MPC · JPL
435216	2007 RK_{245}	—	September 11, 2007	Kitt Peak	Spacewatch	·	1.7 km	MPC · JPL
435217	2007 RM_{247}	—	September 13, 2007	Mount Lemmon	Mount Lemmon Survey	KOR	1.0 km	MPC · JPL
435218	2007 RM_{248}	—	September 13, 2007	Mount Lemmon	Mount Lemmon Survey	AGN	1.0 km	MPC · JPL
435219	2007 RJ_{257}	—	September 14, 2007	Catalina	CSS	·	2.0 km	MPC · JPL
435220	2007 RM_{272}	—	September 15, 2007	Kitt Peak	Spacewatch	ADE	2.1 km	MPC · JPL
435221	2007 RT_{278}	—	September 5, 2007	Siding Spring	SSS	·	2.1 km	MPC · JPL
435222	2007 RR_{284}	—	September 12, 2007	Mount Lemmon	Mount Lemmon Survey	(1547)	1.7 km	MPC · JPL
435223	2007 RC_{289}	—	September 10, 2007	Mount Lemmon	Mount Lemmon Survey	EOS	1.7 km	MPC · JPL
435224	2007 RM_{289}	—	September 12, 2007	Mount Lemmon	Mount Lemmon Survey	THM	1.8 km	MPC · JPL
435225	2007 RJ_{291}	—	September 9, 2007	Kitt Peak	Spacewatch	·	2.1 km	MPC · JPL
435226	2007 RT_{294}	—	September 14, 2007	Kitt Peak	Spacewatch	KOR	1.5 km	MPC · JPL
435227	2007 RX_{296}	—	September 5, 2007	Catalina	CSS	·	4.1 km	MPC · JPL
435228	2007 RR_{300}	—	September 12, 2007	Mount Lemmon	Mount Lemmon Survey	·	2.6 km	MPC · JPL
435229	2007 RB_{308}	—	September 10, 2007	Mount Lemmon	Mount Lemmon Survey	L4	8.0 km	MPC · JPL
435230	2007 RO_{309}	—	September 15, 2007	Socorro	LINEAR	MIS	2.8 km	MPC · JPL
435231	2007 RC_{314}	—	September 13, 2007	Mount Lemmon	Mount Lemmon Survey	·	3.1 km	MPC · JPL
435232	2007 RW_{314}	—	September 3, 2007	Catalina	CSS	·	1.3 km	MPC · JPL
435233	2007 RC_{317}	—	September 10, 2007	Kitt Peak	Spacewatch	·	2.0 km	MPC · JPL
435234	2007 RS_{317}	—	September 10, 2007	Mount Lemmon	Mount Lemmon Survey	·	2.9 km	MPC · JPL
435235	2007 RR_{319}	—	September 12, 2007	Mount Lemmon	Mount Lemmon Survey	·	1.7 km	MPC · JPL
435236	2007 RU_{320}	—	September 14, 2007	Mount Lemmon	Mount Lemmon Survey	EOS	1.5 km	MPC · JPL
435237	2007 RC_{323}	—	September 14, 2007	Mount Lemmon	Mount Lemmon Survey	EOS	1.7 km	MPC · JPL
435238	2007 RE_{323}	—	October 12, 2007	Catalina	CSS	·	2.6 km	MPC · JPL
435239	2007 RE_{324}	—	September 14, 2007	Mount Lemmon	Mount Lemmon Survey	·	1.7 km	MPC · JPL
435240	2007 SV_{15}	—	August 27, 1998	Kitt Peak	Spacewatch	·	1.8 km	MPC · JPL
435241	2007 SD_{20}	—	September 19, 2007	Kitt Peak	Spacewatch	·	1.8 km	MPC · JPL
435242	2007 SY_{22}	—	September 21, 2007	Kitt Peak	Spacewatch	·	3.1 km	MPC · JPL
435243	2007 TD_{11}	—	October 6, 2007	Socorro	LINEAR	·	1.8 km	MPC · JPL
435244	2007 TA_{20}	—	October 6, 2007	Socorro	LINEAR	·	2.6 km	MPC · JPL
435245	2007 TM_{22}	—	October 9, 2007	Eskridge	G. Hug	·	1.9 km	MPC · JPL
435246	2007 TV_{24}	—	October 11, 2007	Socorro	LINEAR	·	1.1 km	MPC · JPL
435247	2007 TX_{34}	—	October 6, 2007	Kitt Peak	Spacewatch	·	2.4 km	MPC · JPL
435248	2007 TQ_{36}	—	September 5, 2007	Catalina	CSS	·	3.1 km	MPC · JPL
435249	2007 TX_{39}	—	September 9, 2007	Mount Lemmon	Mount Lemmon Survey	·	2.6 km	MPC · JPL
435250	2007 TX_{55}	—	October 4, 2007	Kitt Peak	Spacewatch	EOS	1.8 km	MPC · JPL
435251	2007 TM_{57}	—	October 4, 2007	Kitt Peak	Spacewatch	·	2.6 km	MPC · JPL
435252	2007 TB_{68}	—	October 10, 2007	Mount Lemmon	Mount Lemmon Survey	·	1.9 km	MPC · JPL
435253	2007 TT_{81}	—	October 7, 2007	Catalina	CSS	·	1.3 km	MPC · JPL
435254	2007 TV_{87}	—	October 8, 2007	Mount Lemmon	Mount Lemmon Survey	·	2.2 km	MPC · JPL
435255	2007 TC_{99}	—	October 8, 2007	Mount Lemmon	Mount Lemmon Survey	·	2.0 km	MPC · JPL
435256	2007 TM_{133}	—	October 7, 2007	Mount Lemmon	Mount Lemmon Survey	EOS	2.2 km	MPC · JPL
435257	2007 TN_{141}	—	October 9, 2007	Mount Lemmon	Mount Lemmon Survey	·	3.1 km	MPC · JPL
435258	2007 TL_{146}	—	September 5, 2007	Mount Lemmon	Mount Lemmon Survey	·	2.2 km	MPC · JPL
435259	2007 TR_{164}	—	September 12, 2007	Mount Lemmon	Mount Lemmon Survey	·	3.2 km	MPC · JPL
435260	2007 TX_{164}	—	October 11, 2007	Socorro	LINEAR	·	2.1 km	MPC · JPL
435261	2007 TH_{185}	—	October 8, 2007	Kitt Peak	Spacewatch	AEO	1.2 km	MPC · JPL
435262	2007 TQ_{189}	—	May 25, 2006	Mount Lemmon	Mount Lemmon Survey	·	1.8 km	MPC · JPL
435263	2007 TN_{199}	—	October 8, 2007	Kitt Peak	Spacewatch	KOR	1.2 km	MPC · JPL
435264	2007 TV_{214}	—	October 7, 2007	Kitt Peak	Spacewatch	·	2.0 km	MPC · JPL
435265	2007 TN_{218}	—	October 7, 2007	Kitt Peak	Spacewatch	EOS	1.6 km	MPC · JPL
435266	2007 TV_{227}	—	October 8, 2007	Kitt Peak	Spacewatch	·	1.7 km	MPC · JPL
435267	2007 TH_{228}	—	October 8, 2007	Kitt Peak	Spacewatch	·	1.9 km	MPC · JPL
435268	2007 TM_{230}	—	October 8, 2007	Kitt Peak	Spacewatch	EOS	1.6 km	MPC · JPL
435269	2007 TO_{245}	—	October 8, 2007	Mount Lemmon	Mount Lemmon Survey	AST	1.7 km	MPC · JPL
435270	2007 TM_{246}	—	October 9, 2007	Kitt Peak	Spacewatch	·	3.6 km	MPC · JPL
435271	2007 TV_{252}	—	October 7, 2007	Mount Lemmon	Mount Lemmon Survey	KOR	1.2 km	MPC · JPL
435272	2007 TR_{262}	—	September 15, 2007	Mount Lemmon	Mount Lemmon Survey	·	1.8 km	MPC · JPL
435273	2007 TW_{272}	—	October 9, 2007	Kitt Peak	Spacewatch	·	2.7 km	MPC · JPL
435274	2007 TS_{281}	—	October 7, 2007	Catalina	CSS	·	2.6 km	MPC · JPL
435275	2007 TK_{288}	—	October 11, 2007	Catalina	CSS	·	2.6 km	MPC · JPL
435276	2007 TX_{300}	—	October 8, 2007	Kitt Peak	Spacewatch	(13314)	2.0 km	MPC · JPL
435277	2007 TS_{305}	—	September 13, 2007	Kitt Peak	Spacewatch	·	1.9 km	MPC · JPL
435278	2007 TP_{315}	—	October 12, 2007	Kitt Peak	Spacewatch	·	2.2 km	MPC · JPL
435279	2007 TO_{317}	—	October 12, 2007	Kitt Peak	Spacewatch	TRE	2.0 km	MPC · JPL
435280	2007 TT_{319}	—	October 12, 2007	Kitt Peak	Spacewatch	·	1.7 km	MPC · JPL
435281	2007 TU_{328}	—	October 7, 2007	Kitt Peak	Spacewatch	·	2.2 km	MPC · JPL
435282	2007 TV_{333}	—	September 14, 2007	Mount Lemmon	Mount Lemmon Survey	·	1.5 km	MPC · JPL
435283	2007 TC_{347}	—	October 13, 2007	Mount Lemmon	Mount Lemmon Survey	·	3.5 km	MPC · JPL
435284	2007 TE_{361}	—	October 15, 2007	Mount Lemmon	Mount Lemmon Survey	·	2.2 km	MPC · JPL
435285	2007 TU_{372}	—	October 14, 2007	Mount Lemmon	Mount Lemmon Survey	·	1.4 km	MPC · JPL
435286	2007 TM_{377}	—	October 11, 2007	Catalina	CSS	·	2.5 km	MPC · JPL
435287	2007 TO_{382}	—	October 14, 2007	Kitt Peak	Spacewatch	·	3.5 km	MPC · JPL
435288	2007 TS_{384}	—	October 14, 2007	Mount Lemmon	Mount Lemmon Survey	EOS	1.8 km	MPC · JPL
435289	2007 TA_{388}	—	October 13, 2007	Mount Lemmon	Mount Lemmon Survey	·	1.9 km	MPC · JPL
435290	2007 TF_{400}	—	October 10, 2007	Catalina	CSS	JUN	1.2 km	MPC · JPL
435291	2007 TT_{412}	—	October 15, 2007	Anderson Mesa	LONEOS	·	2.2 km	MPC · JPL
435292	2007 TQ_{413}	—	October 15, 2007	Anderson Mesa	LONEOS	·	1.9 km	MPC · JPL
435293	2007 TV_{413}	—	October 15, 2007	Catalina	CSS	DOR	2.6 km	MPC · JPL
435294	2007 TM_{423}	—	October 4, 2007	Kitt Peak	Spacewatch	·	1.9 km	MPC · JPL
435295	2007 TS_{426}	—	October 9, 2007	Kitt Peak	Spacewatch	EOS	1.8 km	MPC · JPL
435296	2007 TQ_{429}	—	September 10, 2007	Mount Lemmon	Mount Lemmon Survey	·	2.2 km	MPC · JPL
435297	2007 TZ_{430}	—	October 7, 2007	Mount Lemmon	Mount Lemmon Survey	·	1.8 km	MPC · JPL
435298	2007 TS_{433}	—	October 12, 2007	Catalina	CSS	·	2.3 km	MPC · JPL
435299	2007 TX_{442}	—	October 10, 2007	Catalina	CSS	·	2.3 km	MPC · JPL
435300	2007 TB_{450}	—	October 10, 2007	Mount Lemmon	Mount Lemmon Survey	·	1.5 km	MPC · JPL

== 435301–435400 ==
back to top

Designation			Discovery			Properties		Ref
Permanent	Provisional	Named after	Date	Site	Discoverer(s)	Category	Diam.	Ref
435301	2007 TD_{452}	—	October 14, 2007	Mount Lemmon	Mount Lemmon Survey	·	2.8 km	MPC · JPL
435302	2007 US_{6}	—	October 21, 2007	Socorro	LINEAR	AMO	770 m	MPC · JPL
435303	2007 UW_{14}	—	October 17, 2007	Catalina	CSS	·	2.2 km	MPC · JPL
435304	2007 UV_{41}	—	October 16, 2007	Mount Lemmon	Mount Lemmon Survey	EOS	1.5 km	MPC · JPL
435305	2007 UN_{44}	—	October 18, 2007	Mount Lemmon	Mount Lemmon Survey	·	2.5 km	MPC · JPL
435306	2007 UD_{51}	—	October 24, 2007	Mount Lemmon	Mount Lemmon Survey	·	2.4 km	MPC · JPL
435307	2007 UH_{54}	—	October 30, 2007	Kitt Peak	Spacewatch	·	2.8 km	MPC · JPL
435308	2007 UV_{55}	—	October 30, 2007	Kitt Peak	Spacewatch	·	2.1 km	MPC · JPL
435309	2007 UZ_{57}	—	October 10, 2007	Kitt Peak	Spacewatch	·	2.2 km	MPC · JPL
435310	2007 UW_{60}	—	October 30, 2007	Mount Lemmon	Mount Lemmon Survey	·	2.1 km	MPC · JPL
435311	2007 UT_{63}	—	October 7, 2007	Mount Lemmon	Mount Lemmon Survey	·	1.7 km	MPC · JPL
435312	2007 UC_{79}	—	October 8, 2007	Kitt Peak	Spacewatch	·	1.7 km	MPC · JPL
435313	2007 UX_{96}	—	October 30, 2007	Kitt Peak	Spacewatch	EOS	1.8 km	MPC · JPL
435314	2007 UW_{99}	—	October 16, 2007	Mount Lemmon	Mount Lemmon Survey	·	3.4 km	MPC · JPL
435315	2007 UH_{102}	—	August 24, 2007	Kitt Peak	Spacewatch	·	2.5 km	MPC · JPL
435316	2007 UK_{111}	—	October 4, 2007	Kitt Peak	Spacewatch	·	1.6 km	MPC · JPL
435317	2007 UE_{122}	—	October 20, 2007	Kitt Peak	Spacewatch	·	2.0 km	MPC · JPL
435318	2007 UJ_{122}	—	October 8, 2007	Mount Lemmon	Mount Lemmon Survey	·	1.6 km	MPC · JPL
435319	2007 UQ_{126}	—	October 16, 2007	Mount Lemmon	Mount Lemmon Survey	EOS	2.0 km	MPC · JPL
435320	2007 UZ_{130}	—	October 17, 2007	Mount Lemmon	Mount Lemmon Survey	NAE	2.1 km	MPC · JPL
435321	2007 UZ_{139}	—	October 31, 2007	Mount Lemmon	Mount Lemmon Survey	·	2.8 km	MPC · JPL
435322	2007 UV_{140}	—	October 20, 2007	Mount Lemmon	Mount Lemmon Survey	·	3.2 km	MPC · JPL
435323	2007 VB_{5}	—	November 3, 2007	Dauban	Chante-Perdrix	·	1.3 km	MPC · JPL
435324	2007 VZ_{8}	—	November 2, 2007	Tucson	R. A. Tucker	·	1.6 km	MPC · JPL
435325	2007 VN_{11}	—	November 2, 2007	Catalina	CSS	·	3.1 km	MPC · JPL
435326	2007 VU_{11}	—	October 31, 2007	Mount Lemmon	Mount Lemmon Survey	·	2.5 km	MPC · JPL
435327	2007 VF_{18}	—	October 7, 2007	Mount Lemmon	Mount Lemmon Survey	·	2.0 km	MPC · JPL
435328	2007 VW_{23}	—	October 10, 2007	Kitt Peak	Spacewatch	·	2.0 km	MPC · JPL
435329	2007 VO_{26}	—	September 26, 2007	Mount Lemmon	Mount Lemmon Survey	TIR	3.1 km	MPC · JPL
435330	2007 VK_{31}	—	October 11, 2007	Kitt Peak	Spacewatch	·	2.0 km	MPC · JPL
435331	2007 VY_{42}	—	November 3, 2007	Kitt Peak	Spacewatch	EOS	2.0 km	MPC · JPL
435332	2007 VX_{45}	—	October 16, 2007	Catalina	CSS	·	3.2 km	MPC · JPL
435333	2007 VR_{46}	—	November 1, 2007	Kitt Peak	Spacewatch	·	4.0 km	MPC · JPL
435334	2007 VR_{49}	—	November 1, 2007	Kitt Peak	Spacewatch	·	3.8 km	MPC · JPL
435335	2007 VG_{50}	—	November 1, 2007	Kitt Peak	Spacewatch	EOS	1.6 km	MPC · JPL
435336	2007 VS_{50}	—	November 1, 2007	Kitt Peak	Spacewatch	·	1.9 km	MPC · JPL
435337	2007 VE_{59}	—	November 1, 2007	Kitt Peak	Spacewatch	·	2.1 km	MPC · JPL
435338	2007 VU_{68}	—	November 3, 2007	Mount Lemmon	Mount Lemmon Survey	EOS	1.6 km	MPC · JPL
435339	2007 VE_{105}	—	November 3, 2007	Kitt Peak	Spacewatch	EOS	1.7 km	MPC · JPL
435340	2007 VO_{106}	—	November 3, 2007	Kitt Peak	Spacewatch	·	3.2 km	MPC · JPL
435341	2007 VP_{111}	—	October 30, 2007	Kitt Peak	Spacewatch	·	2.3 km	MPC · JPL
435342	2007 VY_{113}	—	November 3, 2007	Kitt Peak	Spacewatch	·	2.7 km	MPC · JPL
435343	2007 VB_{121}	—	November 5, 2007	Kitt Peak	Spacewatch	(43176)	2.8 km	MPC · JPL
435344	2007 VM_{124}	—	November 5, 2007	Mount Lemmon	Mount Lemmon Survey	·	2.7 km	MPC · JPL
435345	2007 VS_{147}	—	November 4, 2007	Kitt Peak	Spacewatch	EOS	1.9 km	MPC · JPL
435346	2007 VB_{153}	—	November 3, 2007	Kitt Peak	Spacewatch	·	1.5 km	MPC · JPL
435347	2007 VB_{160}	—	November 5, 2007	Kitt Peak	Spacewatch	·	2.2 km	MPC · JPL
435348	2007 VN_{168}	—	November 5, 2007	Kitt Peak	Spacewatch	LIX	3.1 km	MPC · JPL
435349	2007 VY_{170}	—	November 7, 2007	Kitt Peak	Spacewatch	·	2.1 km	MPC · JPL
435350	2007 VP_{172}	—	November 2, 2007	Mount Lemmon	Mount Lemmon Survey	THM	2.0 km	MPC · JPL
435351	2007 VS_{182}	—	October 12, 2007	Kitt Peak	Spacewatch	·	2.3 km	MPC · JPL
435352	2007 VC_{194}	—	October 8, 2007	Kitt Peak	Spacewatch	·	2.9 km	MPC · JPL
435353	2007 VO_{209}	—	September 9, 2007	Mount Lemmon	Mount Lemmon Survey	EOS	1.5 km	MPC · JPL
435354	2007 VJ_{213}	—	October 14, 2007	Mount Lemmon	Mount Lemmon Survey	·	2.2 km	MPC · JPL
435355	2007 VO_{218}	—	November 5, 2007	Kitt Peak	Spacewatch	·	2.7 km	MPC · JPL
435356	2007 VF_{230}	—	October 17, 2007	Mount Lemmon	Mount Lemmon Survey	·	1.8 km	MPC · JPL
435357	2007 VG_{231}	—	November 7, 2007	Kitt Peak	Spacewatch	·	3.2 km	MPC · JPL
435358	2007 VK_{237}	—	September 18, 2007	Mount Lemmon	Mount Lemmon Survey	THM	2.3 km	MPC · JPL
435359	2007 VD_{242}	—	November 12, 2007	Catalina	CSS	·	2.2 km	MPC · JPL
435360	2007 VP_{247}	—	November 13, 2007	Mount Lemmon	Mount Lemmon Survey	·	2.5 km	MPC · JPL
435361	2007 VN_{250}	—	November 15, 2007	Mount Lemmon	Mount Lemmon Survey	EOS	1.7 km	MPC · JPL
435362	2007 VF_{262}	—	November 13, 2007	Mount Lemmon	Mount Lemmon Survey	·	1.8 km	MPC · JPL
435363	2007 VT_{286}	—	November 14, 2007	Kitt Peak	Spacewatch	·	3.7 km	MPC · JPL
435364	2007 VA_{287}	—	November 15, 2007	Anderson Mesa	LONEOS	DOR	2.6 km	MPC · JPL
435365	2007 VD_{287}	—	October 10, 2007	Mount Lemmon	Mount Lemmon Survey	·	2.4 km	MPC · JPL
435366	2007 VV_{290}	—	November 2, 2007	Kitt Peak	Spacewatch	·	1.8 km	MPC · JPL
435367	2007 VK_{291}	—	November 14, 2007	Kitt Peak	Spacewatch	·	1.7 km	MPC · JPL
435368	2007 VJ_{292}	—	November 14, 2007	Kitt Peak	Spacewatch	·	2.6 km	MPC · JPL
435369	2007 VB_{307}	—	November 2, 2007	Mount Lemmon	Mount Lemmon Survey	·	2.9 km	MPC · JPL
435370	2007 VS_{308}	—	November 7, 2007	Kitt Peak	Spacewatch	·	3.4 km	MPC · JPL
435371	2007 VX_{316}	—	November 11, 2007	Mount Lemmon	Mount Lemmon Survey	·	3.0 km	MPC · JPL
435372	2007 VU_{320}	—	November 2, 2007	Mount Lemmon	Mount Lemmon Survey	·	2.3 km	MPC · JPL
435373	2007 VV_{327}	—	November 8, 2007	Socorro	LINEAR	·	3.3 km	MPC · JPL
435374	2007 VR_{329}	—	November 1, 2007	Kitt Peak	Spacewatch	·	2.3 km	MPC · JPL
435375	2007 VS_{330}	—	November 4, 2007	Mount Lemmon	Mount Lemmon Survey	·	4.6 km	MPC · JPL
435376	2007 VU_{330}	—	November 4, 2007	Kitt Peak	Spacewatch	·	2.5 km	MPC · JPL
435377	2007 WL_{14}	—	November 1, 2007	Kitt Peak	Spacewatch	·	2.3 km	MPC · JPL
435378	2007 WC_{20}	—	November 2, 2007	Mount Lemmon	Mount Lemmon Survey	·	3.2 km	MPC · JPL
435379	2007 WJ_{25}	—	November 18, 2007	Mount Lemmon	Mount Lemmon Survey	(13314)	2.1 km	MPC · JPL
435380	2007 WD_{42}	—	November 18, 2007	Mount Lemmon	Mount Lemmon Survey	·	2.1 km	MPC · JPL
435381	2007 XA_{16}	—	December 8, 2007	La Sagra	OAM	·	6.1 km	MPC · JPL
435382	2007 XG_{16}	—	September 15, 2007	Mount Lemmon	Mount Lemmon Survey	·	2.4 km	MPC · JPL
435383	2007 XN_{34}	—	November 8, 2007	Socorro	LINEAR	·	3.2 km	MPC · JPL
435384	2007 XF_{44}	—	December 15, 2007	Kitt Peak	Spacewatch	·	2.7 km	MPC · JPL
435385	2007 XU_{49}	—	December 15, 2007	Kitt Peak	Spacewatch	·	560 m	MPC · JPL
435386	2007 XQ_{55}	—	October 9, 2007	Kitt Peak	Spacewatch	·	3.6 km	MPC · JPL
435387	2007 XT_{56}	—	December 3, 2007	Kitt Peak	Spacewatch	·	3.5 km	MPC · JPL
435388	2007 XP_{57}	—	December 4, 2007	Kitt Peak	Spacewatch	·	2.8 km	MPC · JPL
435389	2007 YY_{10}	—	November 2, 2007	Mount Lemmon	Mount Lemmon Survey	·	4.0 km	MPC · JPL
435390	2007 YO_{13}	—	November 11, 2007	Mount Lemmon	Mount Lemmon Survey	·	2.4 km	MPC · JPL
435391	2007 YO_{16}	—	December 16, 2007	Kitt Peak	Spacewatch	·	2.3 km	MPC · JPL
435392	2007 YP_{23}	—	November 12, 2007	Mount Lemmon	Mount Lemmon Survey	VER	2.9 km	MPC · JPL
435393	2007 YW_{25}	—	December 18, 2007	Mount Lemmon	Mount Lemmon Survey	VER	3.0 km	MPC · JPL
435394	2007 YO_{28}	—	December 19, 2007	Kitt Peak	Spacewatch	·	2.6 km	MPC · JPL
435395	2007 YA_{30}	—	December 28, 2007	Junk Bond	D. Healy	T_{j} (2.92)	4.6 km	MPC · JPL
435396	2007 YE_{42}	—	December 30, 2007	Kitt Peak	Spacewatch	·	2.7 km	MPC · JPL
435397	2007 YN_{53}	—	December 30, 2007	Kitt Peak	Spacewatch	·	2.5 km	MPC · JPL
435398	2007 YH_{65}	—	December 31, 2007	Kitt Peak	Spacewatch	(31811)	2.8 km	MPC · JPL
435399	2007 YL_{74}	—	December 31, 2007	Lulin	LUSS	·	3.8 km	MPC · JPL
435400	2007 YS_{74}	—	December 30, 2007	Mount Lemmon	Mount Lemmon Survey	·	4.3 km	MPC · JPL

== 435401–435500 ==
back to top

Designation			Discovery			Properties		Ref
Permanent	Provisional	Named after	Date	Site	Discoverer(s)	Category	Diam.	Ref
435401	2008 AZ_{8}	—	December 30, 2007	Mount Lemmon	Mount Lemmon Survey	·	2.8 km	MPC · JPL
435402	2008 AU_{10}	—	January 10, 2008	Mount Lemmon	Mount Lemmon Survey	NYS	670 m	MPC · JPL
435403	2008 AW_{12}	—	January 10, 2008	Mount Lemmon	Mount Lemmon Survey	·	2.3 km	MPC · JPL
435404	2008 AT_{28}	—	January 10, 2008	Kitt Peak	Spacewatch	AMO	920 m	MPC · JPL
435405	2008 AL_{30}	—	January 11, 2008	Desert Eagle	W. K. Y. Yeung	·	3.1 km	MPC · JPL
435406	2008 AU_{47}	—	December 4, 2007	Mount Lemmon	Mount Lemmon Survey	·	3.9 km	MPC · JPL
435407	2008 AM_{59}	—	December 15, 2007	Mount Lemmon	Mount Lemmon Survey	·	3.0 km	MPC · JPL
435408	2008 AP_{59}	—	January 11, 2008	Kitt Peak	Spacewatch	·	3.0 km	MPC · JPL
435409	2008 AU_{62}	—	January 11, 2008	Mount Lemmon	Mount Lemmon Survey	·	530 m	MPC · JPL
435410	2008 AD_{83}	—	November 11, 2007	Mount Lemmon	Mount Lemmon Survey	·	3.1 km	MPC · JPL
435411	2008 AW_{83}	—	November 11, 2007	Mount Lemmon	Mount Lemmon Survey	·	3.3 km	MPC · JPL
435412	2008 AR_{85}	—	December 31, 2007	Mount Lemmon	Mount Lemmon Survey	HYG	2.5 km	MPC · JPL
435413	2008 AA_{93}	—	January 14, 2008	Kitt Peak	Spacewatch	·	3.3 km	MPC · JPL
435414	2008 AU_{99}	—	September 18, 2003	Kitt Peak	Spacewatch	·	710 m	MPC · JPL
435415	2008 AB_{133}	—	December 31, 2007	Kitt Peak	Spacewatch	EOS	2.3 km	MPC · JPL
435416	2008 AS_{137}	—	January 10, 2008	Kitt Peak	Spacewatch	·	700 m	MPC · JPL
435417	2008 AZ_{137}	—	January 12, 2008	Mount Lemmon	Mount Lemmon Survey	·	920 m	MPC · JPL
435418	2008 BX_{14}	—	November 23, 2006	Mount Lemmon	Mount Lemmon Survey	·	3.7 km	MPC · JPL
435419	2008 BO_{35}	—	January 30, 2008	Kitt Peak	Spacewatch	·	730 m	MPC · JPL
435420	2008 BW_{44}	—	November 13, 2006	Catalina	CSS	·	3.5 km	MPC · JPL
435421	2008 BH_{48}	—	January 18, 2008	Kitt Peak	Spacewatch	·	3.4 km	MPC · JPL
435422	2008 BW_{48}	—	January 30, 2008	Mount Lemmon	Mount Lemmon Survey	·	650 m	MPC · JPL
435423	2008 CR_{5}	—	February 6, 2008	Socorro	LINEAR	LIX	4.2 km	MPC · JPL
435424	2008 CQ_{8}	—	January 11, 2008	Mount Lemmon	Mount Lemmon Survey	VER	2.9 km	MPC · JPL
435425	2008 CC_{9}	—	January 14, 2008	Kitt Peak	Spacewatch	·	2.8 km	MPC · JPL
435426	2008 CE_{29}	—	January 10, 2008	Mount Lemmon	Mount Lemmon Survey	·	2.5 km	MPC · JPL
435427	2008 CN_{37}	—	February 2, 2008	Kitt Peak	Spacewatch	·	520 m	MPC · JPL
435428	2008 CW_{39}	—	January 15, 2008	Mount Lemmon	Mount Lemmon Survey	·	540 m	MPC · JPL
435429	2008 CO_{50}	—	February 6, 2008	Anderson Mesa	LONEOS	·	790 m	MPC · JPL
435430	2008 CH_{78}	—	February 7, 2008	Kitt Peak	Spacewatch	·	530 m	MPC · JPL
435431	2008 CL_{78}	—	November 7, 2007	Mount Lemmon	Mount Lemmon Survey	·	920 m	MPC · JPL
435432	2008 CX_{122}	—	February 7, 2008	Mount Lemmon	Mount Lemmon Survey	·	3.0 km	MPC · JPL
435433	2008 CY_{123}	—	January 15, 2008	Mount Lemmon	Mount Lemmon Survey	·	3.6 km	MPC · JPL
435434	2008 CA_{129}	—	February 8, 2008	Kitt Peak	Spacewatch	CYB	2.7 km	MPC · JPL
435435	2008 CW_{140}	—	February 8, 2008	Mount Lemmon	Mount Lemmon Survey	·	620 m	MPC · JPL
435436	2008 CT_{146}	—	February 9, 2008	Kitt Peak	Spacewatch	·	720 m	MPC · JPL
435437	2008 CJ_{147}	—	February 9, 2008	Kitt Peak	Spacewatch	·	760 m	MPC · JPL
435438	2008 CS_{161}	—	December 28, 2007	Kitt Peak	Spacewatch	·	610 m	MPC · JPL
435439	2008 CD_{172}	—	February 12, 2008	Mount Lemmon	Mount Lemmon Survey	·	760 m	MPC · JPL
435440	2008 CN_{195}	—	February 1, 2008	Kitt Peak	Spacewatch	·	660 m	MPC · JPL
435441	2008 DJ_{5}	—	February 28, 2008	Mount Lemmon	Mount Lemmon Survey	APO	360 m	MPC · JPL
435442	2008 DW_{6}	—	February 24, 2008	Kitt Peak	Spacewatch	·	890 m	MPC · JPL
435443	2008 DF_{19}	—	February 7, 2008	Kitt Peak	Spacewatch	·	720 m	MPC · JPL
435444	2008 DP_{20}	—	February 28, 2008	Mount Lemmon	Mount Lemmon Survey	·	610 m	MPC · JPL
435445	2008 DJ_{55}	—	February 26, 2008	Kitt Peak	Spacewatch	·	930 m	MPC · JPL
435446	2008 DR_{66}	—	February 29, 2008	Kitt Peak	Spacewatch	·	670 m	MPC · JPL
435447	2008 DU_{68}	—	February 29, 2008	Kitt Peak	Spacewatch	·	630 m	MPC · JPL
435448	2008 DH_{78}	—	February 8, 2008	Mount Lemmon	Mount Lemmon Survey	·	640 m	MPC · JPL
435449	2008 DS_{81}	—	February 27, 2008	Kitt Peak	Spacewatch	·	600 m	MPC · JPL
435450	2008 ET_{25}	—	January 15, 2008	Mount Lemmon	Mount Lemmon Survey	·	3.5 km	MPC · JPL
435451	2008 EW_{73}	—	February 27, 2008	Kitt Peak	Spacewatch	·	560 m	MPC · JPL
435452	2008 EB_{103}	—	March 5, 2008	Mount Lemmon	Mount Lemmon Survey	·	840 m	MPC · JPL
435453	2008 EO_{116}	—	March 8, 2008	Kitt Peak	Spacewatch	·	710 m	MPC · JPL
435454	2008 ER_{117}	—	March 9, 2008	Mount Lemmon	Mount Lemmon Survey	·	680 m	MPC · JPL
435455	2008 EM_{139}	—	March 11, 2008	Catalina	CSS	·	610 m	MPC · JPL
435456	2008 EN_{142}	—	March 12, 2008	Kitt Peak	Spacewatch	·	670 m	MPC · JPL
435457	2008 EY_{147}	—	March 1, 2008	Kitt Peak	Spacewatch	·	900 m	MPC · JPL
435458	2008 ES_{149}	—	March 5, 2008	Kitt Peak	Spacewatch	·	700 m	MPC · JPL
435459	2008 ES_{150}	—	March 4, 2008	Mount Lemmon	Mount Lemmon Survey	·	810 m	MPC · JPL
435460	2008 ES_{161}	—	March 9, 2008	Kitt Peak	Spacewatch	·	580 m	MPC · JPL
435461	2008 FL_{3}	—	March 25, 2008	Kitt Peak	Spacewatch	·	720 m	MPC · JPL
435462	2008 FW_{4}	—	March 26, 2008	Mount Lemmon	Mount Lemmon Survey	V	730 m	MPC · JPL
435463	2008 FY_{9}	—	March 26, 2008	Kitt Peak	Spacewatch	·	610 m	MPC · JPL
435464	2008 FZ_{16}	—	March 27, 2008	Kitt Peak	Spacewatch	·	980 m	MPC · JPL
435465	2008 FA_{23}	—	March 10, 2008	Mount Lemmon	Mount Lemmon Survey	·	660 m	MPC · JPL
435466	2008 FA_{38}	—	March 4, 2008	Mount Lemmon	Mount Lemmon Survey	·	790 m	MPC · JPL
435467	2008 FB_{41}	—	March 28, 2008	Kitt Peak	Spacewatch	·	670 m	MPC · JPL
435468	2008 FD_{51}	—	March 28, 2008	Mount Lemmon	Mount Lemmon Survey	·	530 m	MPC · JPL
435469	2008 FQ_{66}	—	March 28, 2008	Kitt Peak	Spacewatch	·	720 m	MPC · JPL
435470	2008 FM_{68}	—	March 5, 2008	Mount Lemmon	Mount Lemmon Survey	·	640 m	MPC · JPL
435471	2008 FT_{68}	—	March 28, 2008	Mount Lemmon	Mount Lemmon Survey	·	890 m	MPC · JPL
435472	2008 FS_{75}	—	March 31, 2008	Mount Lemmon	Mount Lemmon Survey	·	680 m	MPC · JPL
435473	2008 FD_{84}	—	March 10, 2008	Kitt Peak	Spacewatch	·	550 m	MPC · JPL
435474	2008 FD_{98}	—	March 30, 2008	Kitt Peak	Spacewatch	·	600 m	MPC · JPL
435475	2008 FN_{102}	—	March 30, 2008	Kitt Peak	Spacewatch	·	720 m	MPC · JPL
435476	2008 FC_{103}	—	March 30, 2008	Kitt Peak	Spacewatch	·	610 m	MPC · JPL
435477	2008 FU_{106}	—	March 31, 2008	Kitt Peak	Spacewatch	·	580 m	MPC · JPL
435478	2008 FC_{116}	—	March 31, 2008	Mount Lemmon	Mount Lemmon Survey	·	860 m	MPC · JPL
435479	2008 FG_{119}	—	March 31, 2008	Mount Lemmon	Mount Lemmon Survey	·	680 m	MPC · JPL
435480	2008 FR_{122}	—	March 26, 2008	Kitt Peak	Spacewatch	·	770 m	MPC · JPL
435481	2008 FS_{124}	—	March 30, 2008	Kitt Peak	Spacewatch	·	700 m	MPC · JPL
435482	2008 FB_{130}	—	March 29, 2008	Mount Lemmon	Mount Lemmon Survey	·	660 m	MPC · JPL
435483	2008 FU_{136}	—	March 29, 2008	Kitt Peak	Spacewatch	(2076)	680 m	MPC · JPL
435484	2008 GY_{2}	—	March 11, 2008	Catalina	CSS	PHO	880 m	MPC · JPL
435485	2008 GV_{4}	—	February 10, 2008	Kitt Peak	Spacewatch	CYB	3.3 km	MPC · JPL
435486	2008 GD_{6}	—	March 27, 2008	Kitt Peak	Spacewatch	·	690 m	MPC · JPL
435487	2008 GJ_{9}	—	April 1, 2008	Kitt Peak	Spacewatch	·	970 m	MPC · JPL
435488	2008 GH_{11}	—	April 1, 2008	Kitt Peak	Spacewatch	·	1.1 km	MPC · JPL
435489	2008 GL_{35}	—	April 3, 2008	Kitt Peak	Spacewatch	·	650 m	MPC · JPL
435490	2008 GW_{36}	—	April 3, 2008	Kitt Peak	Spacewatch	·	850 m	MPC · JPL
435491	2008 GF_{43}	—	April 4, 2008	Mount Lemmon	Mount Lemmon Survey	·	710 m	MPC · JPL
435492	2008 GZ_{49}	—	April 5, 2008	Kitt Peak	Spacewatch	·	680 m	MPC · JPL
435493	2008 GK_{75}	—	March 30, 2008	Kitt Peak	Spacewatch	·	660 m	MPC · JPL
435494	2008 GT_{79}	—	April 7, 2008	Kitt Peak	Spacewatch	MAS	640 m	MPC · JPL
435495	2008 GB_{80}	—	April 7, 2008	Kitt Peak	Spacewatch	·	710 m	MPC · JPL
435496	2008 GR_{81}	—	April 7, 2008	Kitt Peak	Spacewatch	·	670 m	MPC · JPL
435497	2008 GP_{85}	—	April 3, 2008	Kitt Peak	Spacewatch	·	670 m	MPC · JPL
435498	2008 GF_{90}	—	March 5, 2008	Kitt Peak	Spacewatch	·	580 m	MPC · JPL
435499	2008 GN_{94}	—	March 28, 2008	Kitt Peak	Spacewatch	·	750 m	MPC · JPL
435500	2008 GK_{100}	—	April 9, 2008	Kitt Peak	Spacewatch	·	570 m	MPC · JPL

== 435501–435600 ==
back to top

Designation			Discovery			Properties		Ref
Permanent	Provisional	Named after	Date	Site	Discoverer(s)	Category	Diam.	Ref
435501	2008 GB_{111}	—	March 11, 2008	Catalina	CSS	PHO	820 m	MPC · JPL
435502	2008 GD_{121}	—	April 13, 2008	Kitt Peak	Spacewatch	(2076)	700 m	MPC · JPL
435503	2008 GK_{122}	—	April 13, 2008	Kitt Peak	Spacewatch	·	580 m	MPC · JPL
435504	2008 GS_{132}	—	April 14, 2008	Kitt Peak	Spacewatch	·	1.0 km	MPC · JPL
435505	2008 HG_{10}	—	April 24, 2008	Mount Lemmon	Mount Lemmon Survey	V	580 m	MPC · JPL
435506	2008 HK_{11}	—	April 10, 2008	Kitt Peak	Spacewatch	·	990 m	MPC · JPL
435507	2008 HP_{16}	—	April 25, 2008	Kitt Peak	Spacewatch	·	730 m	MPC · JPL
435508	2008 HE_{23}	—	March 10, 2008	Kitt Peak	Spacewatch	·	610 m	MPC · JPL
435509	2008 HF_{28}	—	April 28, 2008	Kitt Peak	Spacewatch	·	640 m	MPC · JPL
435510	2008 HV_{28}	—	April 28, 2008	Kitt Peak	Spacewatch	·	700 m	MPC · JPL
435511	2008 HP_{41}	—	April 26, 2008	Mount Lemmon	Mount Lemmon Survey	·	820 m	MPC · JPL
435512	2008 HU_{47}	—	April 28, 2008	Kitt Peak	Spacewatch	·	570 m	MPC · JPL
435513	2008 HQ_{50}	—	April 29, 2008	Kitt Peak	Spacewatch	·	640 m	MPC · JPL
435514	2008 HJ_{62}	—	April 30, 2008	Kitt Peak	Spacewatch	V	560 m	MPC · JPL
435515	2008 HW_{66}	—	April 26, 2008	Kitt Peak	Spacewatch	·	860 m	MPC · JPL
435516	2008 JE_{10}	—	May 3, 2008	Kitt Peak	Spacewatch	·	650 m	MPC · JPL
435517	2008 JO_{10}	—	April 8, 2008	Kitt Peak	Spacewatch	·	770 m	MPC · JPL
435518	2008 JR_{11}	—	May 3, 2008	Kitt Peak	Spacewatch	·	700 m	MPC · JPL
435519	2008 JQ_{15}	—	May 2, 2008	Kitt Peak	Spacewatch	·	740 m	MPC · JPL
435520	2008 JA_{16}	—	May 3, 2008	Mount Lemmon	Mount Lemmon Survey	·	530 m	MPC · JPL
435521	2008 JL_{34}	—	April 15, 2008	Mount Lemmon	Mount Lemmon Survey	·	780 m	MPC · JPL
435522	2008 JF_{39}	—	May 4, 2008	Kitt Peak	Spacewatch	·	630 m	MPC · JPL
435523	2008 KW_{4}	—	May 27, 2008	Kitt Peak	Spacewatch	·	1.2 km	MPC · JPL
435524	2008 KR_{8}	—	May 3, 2008	Kitt Peak	Spacewatch	·	560 m	MPC · JPL
435525	2008 KM_{9}	—	May 27, 2008	Kitt Peak	Spacewatch	·	860 m	MPC · JPL
435526	2008 KF_{15}	—	May 27, 2008	Kitt Peak	Spacewatch	V	610 m	MPC · JPL
435527	2008 KU_{17}	—	April 28, 2008	Kitt Peak	Spacewatch	·	650 m	MPC · JPL
435528	2008 KG_{25}	—	May 29, 2008	Mount Lemmon	Mount Lemmon Survey	·	1.1 km	MPC · JPL
435529	2008 KK_{25}	—	May 29, 2008	Mount Lemmon	Mount Lemmon Survey	·	790 m	MPC · JPL
435530	2008 KC_{33}	—	May 4, 2008	Kitt Peak	Spacewatch	·	1.0 km	MPC · JPL
435531	2008 KC_{35}	—	May 27, 2008	Kitt Peak	Spacewatch	·	1.1 km	MPC · JPL
435532	2008 KK_{35}	—	May 27, 2008	Kitt Peak	Spacewatch	·	830 m	MPC · JPL
435533	2008 LA_{1}	—	April 24, 2008	Kitt Peak	Spacewatch	V	490 m	MPC · JPL
435534	2008 LA_{17}	—	May 13, 2008	Mount Lemmon	Mount Lemmon Survey	·	1.0 km	MPC · JPL
435535	2008 LG_{17}	—	May 26, 2008	Kitt Peak	Spacewatch	·	1.2 km	MPC · JPL
435536	2008 LN_{17}	—	June 10, 2008	Kitt Peak	Spacewatch	·	1.2 km	MPC · JPL
435537	2008 ME_{5}	—	June 30, 2008	Kitt Peak	Spacewatch	·	920 m	MPC · JPL
435538	2008 NW_{2}	—	July 2, 2008	Kitt Peak	Spacewatch	ADE	1.9 km	MPC · JPL
435539	2008 OV	—	July 25, 2008	La Sagra	OAM	·	1.2 km	MPC · JPL
435540	2008 OS_{1}	—	June 14, 2008	Kitt Peak	Spacewatch	T_{j} (2.95) · 3:2	5.3 km	MPC · JPL
435541	2008 OF_{3}	—	July 27, 2008	Bisei SG Center	BATTeRS	·	1.0 km	MPC · JPL
435542	2008 OH_{20}	—	July 30, 2008	Kitt Peak	Spacewatch	·	860 m	MPC · JPL
435543	2008 OJ_{23}	—	July 25, 2008	Siding Spring	SSS	·	1.4 km	MPC · JPL
435544	2008 OV_{23}	—	July 30, 2008	Kitt Peak	Spacewatch	EUN	1.1 km	MPC · JPL
435545	2008 OC_{24}	—	July 30, 2008	Catalina	CSS	·	1.1 km	MPC · JPL
435546	2008 OK_{25}	—	July 29, 2008	Mount Lemmon	Mount Lemmon Survey	·	2.6 km	MPC · JPL
435547	2008 PX_{4}	—	August 5, 2008	Hibiscus	S. F. Hönig, Teamo, N.	·	1.5 km	MPC · JPL
435548	2008 QT_{3}	—	August 24, 2008	Črni Vrh	Skvarč, J.	APO · PHA	600 m	MPC · JPL
435549	2008 QZ_{3}	—	August 24, 2008	Vicques	M. Ory	NYS	1.1 km	MPC · JPL
435550	2008 QY_{9}	—	August 21, 2008	Kitt Peak	Spacewatch	·	900 m	MPC · JPL
435551	2008 QY_{12}	—	August 7, 2008	Kitt Peak	Spacewatch	NYS	970 m	MPC · JPL
435552 Morin	2008 QM_{14}	Morin	August 27, 2008	Parc National des Cévennes	C. Demeautis, J.-M. Lopez	·	1.9 km	MPC · JPL
435553	2008 QB_{21}	—	August 26, 2008	Socorro	LINEAR	·	1.3 km	MPC · JPL
435554	2008 QO_{36}	—	August 21, 2008	Kitt Peak	Spacewatch	NYS	1.0 km	MPC · JPL
435555	2008 QF_{38}	—	August 23, 2008	Kitt Peak	Spacewatch	·	1.3 km	MPC · JPL
435556	2008 QB_{40}	—	August 27, 2008	La Sagra	OAM	·	1.1 km	MPC · JPL
435557	2008 QG_{48}	—	August 27, 2008	La Sagra	OAM	·	1.1 km	MPC · JPL
435558	2008 RT_{3}	—	September 2, 2008	Kitt Peak	Spacewatch	·	1.0 km	MPC · JPL
435559	2008 RW_{3}	—	September 2, 2008	Kitt Peak	Spacewatch	·	960 m	MPC · JPL
435560	2008 RS_{9}	—	September 3, 2008	Kitt Peak	Spacewatch	L4	7.7 km	MPC · JPL
435561	2008 RN_{25}	—	September 5, 2008	Junk Bond	D. Healy	MAS	640 m	MPC · JPL
435562	2008 RX_{27}	—	September 1, 2008	Siding Spring	SSS	PHO	1.0 km	MPC · JPL
435563	2008 RA_{29}	—	September 2, 2008	Kitt Peak	Spacewatch	·	1.7 km	MPC · JPL
435564	2008 RQ_{30}	—	September 2, 2008	Kitt Peak	Spacewatch	MAS	750 m	MPC · JPL
435565	2008 RM_{39}	—	September 2, 2008	Kitt Peak	Spacewatch	KON	2.4 km	MPC · JPL
435566	2008 RN_{42}	—	September 2, 2008	Kitt Peak	Spacewatch	NYS	1.0 km	MPC · JPL
435567	2008 RS_{49}	—	July 29, 2008	Mount Lemmon	Mount Lemmon Survey	L4	9.4 km	MPC · JPL
435568	2008 RU_{49}	—	September 3, 2008	Kitt Peak	Spacewatch	L4	8.5 km	MPC · JPL
435569	2008 RK_{68}	—	September 4, 2008	Kitt Peak	Spacewatch	·	2.0 km	MPC · JPL
435570	2008 RT_{68}	—	September 4, 2008	Kitt Peak	Spacewatch	·	1.7 km	MPC · JPL
435571	2008 RY_{71}	—	August 21, 2008	Kitt Peak	Spacewatch	·	1.5 km	MPC · JPL
435572	2008 RH_{73}	—	August 21, 2008	Kitt Peak	Spacewatch	·	1.2 km	MPC · JPL
435573	2008 RA_{82}	—	September 4, 2008	Kitt Peak	Spacewatch	L4	6.8 km	MPC · JPL
435574	2008 RD_{85}	—	September 4, 2008	Kitt Peak	Spacewatch	·	1.2 km	MPC · JPL
435575	2008 RX_{99}	—	September 2, 2008	Kitt Peak	Spacewatch	AEO	1.1 km	MPC · JPL
435576	2008 RO_{105}	—	September 6, 2008	Mount Lemmon	Mount Lemmon Survey	·	1.7 km	MPC · JPL
435577	2008 RV_{109}	—	September 3, 2008	Kitt Peak	Spacewatch	·	1.6 km	MPC · JPL
435578	2008 RB_{113}	—	September 5, 2008	Kitt Peak	Spacewatch	·	1.2 km	MPC · JPL
435579	2008 RJ_{113}	—	September 5, 2008	Kitt Peak	Spacewatch	·	2.3 km	MPC · JPL
435580	2008 RW_{114}	—	September 6, 2008	Mount Lemmon	Mount Lemmon Survey	BRA	1.5 km	MPC · JPL
435581	2008 RE_{119}	—	September 3, 2008	Kitt Peak	Spacewatch	MAS	570 m	MPC · JPL
435582	2008 RZ_{121}	—	September 3, 2008	Kitt Peak	Spacewatch	L4	9.3 km	MPC · JPL
435583	2008 RH_{122}	—	September 3, 2008	Kitt Peak	Spacewatch	L4	7.9 km	MPC · JPL
435584	2008 RR_{122}	—	September 4, 2008	Kitt Peak	Spacewatch	MAR	1.1 km	MPC · JPL
435585	2008 RP_{129}	—	September 7, 2008	Mount Lemmon	Mount Lemmon Survey	·	1.9 km	MPC · JPL
435586	2008 RF_{130}	—	September 7, 2008	Mount Lemmon	Mount Lemmon Survey	·	1.7 km	MPC · JPL
435587	2008 RP_{136}	—	September 4, 2008	Kitt Peak	Spacewatch	·	1.0 km	MPC · JPL
435588	2008 RR_{139}	—	September 7, 2008	Catalina	CSS	NYS	1.1 km	MPC · JPL
435589	2008 RV_{139}	—	September 7, 2008	Mount Lemmon	Mount Lemmon Survey	·	1.6 km	MPC · JPL
435590	2008 RW_{140}	—	September 9, 2008	Mount Lemmon	Mount Lemmon Survey	EUN	1.1 km	MPC · JPL
435591	2008 SY_{2}	—	September 19, 2008	Socorro	LINEAR	·	1.3 km	MPC · JPL
435592	2008 SJ_{8}	—	September 5, 2008	Kitt Peak	Spacewatch	·	2.7 km	MPC · JPL
435593	2008 SL_{9}	—	September 4, 2003	Kitt Peak	Spacewatch	·	2.8 km	MPC · JPL
435594	2008 SY_{9}	—	September 22, 2008	Socorro	LINEAR	·	1.6 km	MPC · JPL
435595	2008 SN_{11}	—	September 6, 2008	Kitt Peak	Spacewatch	·	1.4 km	MPC · JPL
435596	2008 SJ_{14}	—	July 29, 2008	Kitt Peak	Spacewatch	·	1.1 km	MPC · JPL
435597	2008 SB_{21}	—	September 19, 2008	Kitt Peak	Spacewatch	·	1.1 km	MPC · JPL
435598	2008 SB_{36}	—	September 20, 2008	Kitt Peak	Spacewatch	·	1.1 km	MPC · JPL
435599	2008 SQ_{39}	—	September 20, 2008	Kitt Peak	Spacewatch	·	1.9 km	MPC · JPL
435600	2008 SK_{45}	—	September 20, 2008	Kitt Peak	Spacewatch	·	2.9 km	MPC · JPL

== 435601–435700 ==
back to top

Designation			Discovery			Properties		Ref
Permanent	Provisional	Named after	Date	Site	Discoverer(s)	Category	Diam.	Ref
435601	2008 SL_{45}	—	September 20, 2008	Kitt Peak	Spacewatch	·	920 m	MPC · JPL
435602	2008 SN_{54}	—	September 20, 2008	Mount Lemmon	Mount Lemmon Survey	·	1.4 km	MPC · JPL
435603	2008 SF_{55}	—	September 20, 2008	Mount Lemmon	Mount Lemmon Survey	·	1.9 km	MPC · JPL
435604	2008 SC_{59}	—	September 20, 2008	Kitt Peak	Spacewatch	·	1.8 km	MPC · JPL
435605	2008 SG_{61}	—	September 20, 2008	Kitt Peak	Spacewatch	·	1.9 km	MPC · JPL
435606	2008 SE_{62}	—	September 9, 2008	Mount Lemmon	Mount Lemmon Survey	·	1.2 km	MPC · JPL
435607	2008 SN_{63}	—	September 7, 2008	Mount Lemmon	Mount Lemmon Survey	·	840 m	MPC · JPL
435608	2008 SL_{66}	—	September 21, 2008	Catalina	CSS	·	1.1 km	MPC · JPL
435609	2008 SX_{68}	—	September 22, 2008	Kitt Peak	Spacewatch	NYS	1.1 km	MPC · JPL
435610	2008 SA_{70}	—	August 6, 2008	Siding Spring	SSS	·	1.9 km	MPC · JPL
435611	2008 SK_{71}	—	September 22, 2008	Kitt Peak	Spacewatch	·	1.4 km	MPC · JPL
435612	2008 SU_{77}	—	September 23, 2008	Mount Lemmon	Mount Lemmon Survey	·	950 m	MPC · JPL
435613	2008 SP_{83}	—	September 27, 2008	Altschwendt	W. Ries	L4	8.9 km	MPC · JPL
435614	2008 SP_{86}	—	September 20, 2008	Kitt Peak	Spacewatch	·	1.8 km	MPC · JPL
435615	2008 SO_{95}	—	September 21, 2008	Kitt Peak	Spacewatch	·	1.8 km	MPC · JPL
435616	2008 SJ_{100}	—	September 21, 2008	Kitt Peak	Spacewatch	·	1.3 km	MPC · JPL
435617	2008 SL_{101}	—	September 21, 2008	Kitt Peak	Spacewatch	(5)	1.1 km	MPC · JPL
435618	2008 SW_{104}	—	September 21, 2008	Kitt Peak	Spacewatch	·	1.2 km	MPC · JPL
435619	2008 SF_{105}	—	September 21, 2008	Kitt Peak	Spacewatch	EUN	1.5 km	MPC · JPL
435620	2008 SP_{107}	—	September 22, 2008	Kitt Peak	Spacewatch	L4	8.2 km	MPC · JPL
435621	2008 SJ_{114}	—	September 22, 2008	Kitt Peak	Spacewatch	·	1.2 km	MPC · JPL
435622	2008 SX_{119}	—	September 22, 2008	Mount Lemmon	Mount Lemmon Survey	·	1.5 km	MPC · JPL
435623	2008 SA_{121}	—	September 22, 2008	Mount Lemmon	Mount Lemmon Survey	·	800 m	MPC · JPL
435624	2008 SG_{121}	—	September 22, 2008	Mount Lemmon	Mount Lemmon Survey	·	1.4 km	MPC · JPL
435625	2008 SA_{123}	—	September 22, 2008	Mount Lemmon	Mount Lemmon Survey	MAR	1 km	MPC · JPL
435626	2008 SB_{123}	—	September 22, 2008	Mount Lemmon	Mount Lemmon Survey	·	1.9 km	MPC · JPL
435627	2008 SU_{125}	—	September 22, 2008	Mount Lemmon	Mount Lemmon Survey	·	2.1 km	MPC · JPL
435628	2008 SJ_{128}	—	September 22, 2008	Kitt Peak	Spacewatch	·	2.2 km	MPC · JPL
435629	2008 SS_{128}	—	September 22, 2008	Kitt Peak	Spacewatch	NYS	1.1 km	MPC · JPL
435630	2008 SR_{129}	—	September 22, 2008	Kitt Peak	Spacewatch	H	480 m	MPC · JPL
435631	2008 SE_{133}	—	September 22, 2008	Kitt Peak	Spacewatch	MAR	990 m	MPC · JPL
435632	2008 SB_{137}	—	September 23, 2008	Mount Lemmon	Mount Lemmon Survey	L4 · (8060)	8.2 km	MPC · JPL
435633	2008 SW_{141}	—	September 24, 2008	Mount Lemmon	Mount Lemmon Survey	·	1.8 km	MPC · JPL
435634	2008 SX_{141}	—	September 24, 2008	Mount Lemmon	Mount Lemmon Survey	·	1.9 km	MPC · JPL
435635	2008 SJ_{155}	—	September 23, 2008	Socorro	LINEAR	·	1.7 km	MPC · JPL
435636	2008 SM_{158}	—	September 24, 2008	Socorro	LINEAR	PHO	950 m	MPC · JPL
435637	2008 SB_{164}	—	September 28, 2008	Socorro	LINEAR	·	1.9 km	MPC · JPL
435638	2008 SA_{172}	—	March 14, 2007	Catalina	CSS	H	620 m	MPC · JPL
435639	2008 SX_{187}	—	September 25, 2008	Kitt Peak	Spacewatch	·	1.2 km	MPC · JPL
435640	2008 ST_{193}	—	September 25, 2008	Kitt Peak	Spacewatch	(5)	950 m	MPC · JPL
435641	2008 SX_{193}	—	September 25, 2008	Kitt Peak	Spacewatch	·	1.6 km	MPC · JPL
435642	2008 SH_{204}	—	September 26, 2008	Kitt Peak	Spacewatch	·	1.4 km	MPC · JPL
435643	2008 SF_{210}	—	September 2, 2008	Kitt Peak	Spacewatch	·	2.0 km	MPC · JPL
435644	2008 SN_{219}	—	September 5, 2008	Kitt Peak	Spacewatch	EUN	1.2 km	MPC · JPL
435645	2008 SY_{224}	—	September 26, 2008	Kitt Peak	Spacewatch	L4	7.2 km	MPC · JPL
435646	2008 SR_{225}	—	September 26, 2008	Kitt Peak	Spacewatch	·	1.3 km	MPC · JPL
435647	2008 SB_{232}	—	September 28, 2008	Mount Lemmon	Mount Lemmon Survey	L4	7.1 km	MPC · JPL
435648	2008 SL_{237}	—	September 29, 2008	Mount Lemmon	Mount Lemmon Survey	·	2.5 km	MPC · JPL
435649	2008 SX_{239}	—	September 21, 2008	Kitt Peak	Spacewatch	·	1.8 km	MPC · JPL
435650	2008 SA_{245}	—	September 2, 2008	Kitt Peak	Spacewatch	·	1.3 km	MPC · JPL
435651	2008 SR_{258}	—	September 22, 2008	Catalina	CSS	·	2.1 km	MPC · JPL
435652	2008 SF_{263}	—	September 24, 2008	Kitt Peak	Spacewatch	L4	7.7 km	MPC · JPL
435653	2008 SA_{266}	—	September 29, 2008	Kitt Peak	Spacewatch	·	1.4 km	MPC · JPL
435654	2008 SP_{269}	—	September 22, 2008	Kitt Peak	Spacewatch	·	1.8 km	MPC · JPL
435655	2008 SY_{269}	—	September 23, 2008	Kitt Peak	Spacewatch	MAR	1.3 km	MPC · JPL
435656	2008 SC_{270}	—	September 23, 2008	Catalina	CSS	·	1.6 km	MPC · JPL
435657	2008 SV_{271}	—	September 23, 2008	Mount Lemmon	Mount Lemmon Survey	·	2.0 km	MPC · JPL
435658	2008 SG_{274}	—	September 19, 2008	Kitt Peak	Spacewatch	L4	7.5 km	MPC · JPL
435659	2008 SN_{274}	—	September 20, 2008	Mount Lemmon	Mount Lemmon Survey	L4	6.9 km	MPC · JPL
435660	2008 SW_{278}	—	September 25, 2008	Kitt Peak	Spacewatch	L4	8.3 km	MPC · JPL
435661	2008 SY_{279}	—	September 24, 2008	Kitt Peak	Spacewatch	·	1.4 km	MPC · JPL
435662	2008 SN_{282}	—	September 22, 2008	Kitt Peak	Spacewatch	WIT	850 m	MPC · JPL
435663	2008 SJ_{288}	—	September 23, 2008	Kitt Peak	Spacewatch	·	1.8 km	MPC · JPL
435664	2008 ST_{288}	—	September 24, 2008	Mount Lemmon	Mount Lemmon Survey	EUN	1.1 km	MPC · JPL
435665	2008 SN_{290}	—	September 29, 2008	Kitt Peak	Spacewatch	WIT	880 m	MPC · JPL
435666	2008 SE_{291}	—	September 20, 2008	Mount Lemmon	Mount Lemmon Survey	H	490 m	MPC · JPL
435667	2008 SY_{292}	—	September 24, 2008	Catalina	CSS	·	2.0 km	MPC · JPL
435668	2008 SF_{304}	—	September 24, 2008	Mount Lemmon	Mount Lemmon Survey	·	1.4 km	MPC · JPL
435669	2008 SR_{306}	—	September 28, 2008	Mount Lemmon	Mount Lemmon Survey	·	2.1 km	MPC · JPL
435670	2008 TK_{2}	—	September 23, 2008	Catalina	CSS	H	520 m	MPC · JPL
435671	2008 TP_{2}	—	October 4, 2008	La Sagra	OAM	H	730 m	MPC · JPL
435672	2008 TO_{3}	—	October 5, 2008	Hibiscus	Teamo, N.	·	880 m	MPC · JPL
435673	2008 TM_{18}	—	September 9, 2008	Mount Lemmon	Mount Lemmon Survey	KON	2.3 km	MPC · JPL
435674	2008 TT_{27}	—	September 19, 2008	Kitt Peak	Spacewatch	EUN	1.4 km	MPC · JPL
435675	2008 TT_{31}	—	October 1, 2008	Kitt Peak	Spacewatch	·	1.3 km	MPC · JPL
435676	2008 TO_{37}	—	October 1, 2008	Mount Lemmon	Mount Lemmon Survey	·	1.5 km	MPC · JPL
435677	2008 TX_{46}	—	October 1, 2008	Kitt Peak	Spacewatch	·	1.8 km	MPC · JPL
435678	2008 TD_{47}	—	October 1, 2008	Kitt Peak	Spacewatch	·	970 m	MPC · JPL
435679	2008 TB_{60}	—	September 24, 2008	Kitt Peak	Spacewatch	EUN	1.1 km	MPC · JPL
435680	2008 TY_{62}	—	September 22, 2008	Mount Lemmon	Mount Lemmon Survey	MAR	850 m	MPC · JPL
435681	2008 TK_{63}	—	September 22, 2008	Mount Lemmon	Mount Lemmon Survey	·	1.3 km	MPC · JPL
435682	2008 TU_{66}	—	March 25, 2006	Mount Lemmon	Mount Lemmon Survey	·	1.7 km	MPC · JPL
435683	2008 TW_{68}	—	October 2, 2008	Kitt Peak	Spacewatch	·	1.3 km	MPC · JPL
435684	2008 TS_{75}	—	September 22, 2008	Mount Lemmon	Mount Lemmon Survey	·	1.8 km	MPC · JPL
435685	2008 TV_{78}	—	July 2, 2000	Kitt Peak	Spacewatch	MAS	720 m	MPC · JPL
435686	2008 TV_{90}	—	October 3, 2008	Kitt Peak	Spacewatch	H	620 m	MPC · JPL
435687	2008 TO_{95}	—	September 22, 2008	Catalina	CSS	·	1.6 km	MPC · JPL
435688	2008 TH_{96}	—	October 6, 2008	Kitt Peak	Spacewatch	·	2.3 km	MPC · JPL
435689	2008 TM_{103}	—	October 6, 2008	Kitt Peak	Spacewatch	EUN	1.3 km	MPC · JPL
435690	2008 TN_{104}	—	October 6, 2008	Kitt Peak	Spacewatch	H	420 m	MPC · JPL
435691	2008 TX_{110}	—	October 6, 2008	Catalina	CSS	EUN	1.1 km	MPC · JPL
435692	2008 TJ_{114}	—	September 23, 2008	Kitt Peak	Spacewatch	·	1.4 km	MPC · JPL
435693	2008 TQ_{122}	—	September 7, 2008	Mount Lemmon	Mount Lemmon Survey	·	1.3 km	MPC · JPL
435694	2008 TN_{128}	—	November 10, 2004	Kitt Peak	Spacewatch	·	1.5 km	MPC · JPL
435695	2008 TX_{132}	—	October 8, 2008	Mount Lemmon	Mount Lemmon Survey	·	2.4 km	MPC · JPL
435696	2008 TT_{135}	—	October 8, 2008	Kitt Peak	Spacewatch	·	870 m	MPC · JPL
435697	2008 TU_{139}	—	October 8, 2008	Mount Lemmon	Mount Lemmon Survey	(5)	1.3 km	MPC · JPL
435698	2008 TE_{142}	—	February 24, 2006	Kitt Peak	Spacewatch	GEF	1.2 km	MPC · JPL
435699	2008 TQ_{142}	—	October 9, 2008	Mount Lemmon	Mount Lemmon Survey	·	1 km	MPC · JPL
435700	2008 TW_{146}	—	October 9, 2008	Mount Lemmon	Mount Lemmon Survey	·	1.6 km	MPC · JPL

== 435701–435800 ==
back to top

Designation			Discovery			Properties		Ref
Permanent	Provisional	Named after	Date	Site	Discoverer(s)	Category	Diam.	Ref
435701	2008 TF_{148}	—	October 9, 2008	Mount Lemmon	Mount Lemmon Survey	·	2.6 km	MPC · JPL
435702	2008 TY_{149}	—	October 9, 2008	Mount Lemmon	Mount Lemmon Survey	·	1.8 km	MPC · JPL
435703	2008 TV_{151}	—	September 28, 2008	Mount Lemmon	Mount Lemmon Survey	·	1.7 km	MPC · JPL
435704	2008 TQ_{165}	—	October 4, 2008	Catalina	CSS	·	1.2 km	MPC · JPL
435705	2008 TX_{170}	—	October 9, 2008	Mount Lemmon	Mount Lemmon Survey	·	1.1 km	MPC · JPL
435706	2008 TT_{172}	—	October 4, 2008	Mount Lemmon	Mount Lemmon Survey	WIT	930 m	MPC · JPL
435707	2008 TG_{173}	—	October 2, 2008	Kitt Peak	Spacewatch	·	1.2 km	MPC · JPL
435708	2008 TB_{176}	—	October 10, 2008	Kitt Peak	Spacewatch	·	1.1 km	MPC · JPL
435709	2008 UF_{2}	—	October 19, 2008	Farra d'Isonzo	Farra d'Isonzo	·	1.5 km	MPC · JPL
435710	2008 UL_{8}	—	August 24, 2008	Kitt Peak	Spacewatch	·	1.7 km	MPC · JPL
435711	2008 UP_{17}	—	March 26, 2006	Kitt Peak	Spacewatch	AEO	1.1 km	MPC · JPL
435712	2008 UO_{21}	—	October 19, 2008	Kitt Peak	Spacewatch	·	2.5 km	MPC · JPL
435713	2008 UF_{26}	—	March 24, 2006	Anderson Mesa	LONEOS	·	2.7 km	MPC · JPL
435714	2008 UZ_{26}	—	October 20, 2008	Kitt Peak	Spacewatch	·	1.5 km	MPC · JPL
435715	2008 UQ_{32}	—	October 20, 2008	Kitt Peak	Spacewatch	·	2.5 km	MPC · JPL
435716	2008 UC_{33}	—	October 20, 2008	Kitt Peak	Spacewatch	·	910 m	MPC · JPL
435717	2008 UO_{39}	—	October 20, 2008	Mount Lemmon	Mount Lemmon Survey	·	1.6 km	MPC · JPL
435718	2008 UV_{46}	—	October 20, 2008	Kitt Peak	Spacewatch	·	1.7 km	MPC · JPL
435719	2008 UF_{47}	—	October 20, 2008	Kitt Peak	Spacewatch	·	1.6 km	MPC · JPL
435720	2008 UO_{47}	—	October 20, 2008	Kitt Peak	Spacewatch	EUN	1.5 km	MPC · JPL
435721	2008 UY_{52}	—	September 24, 2008	Mount Lemmon	Mount Lemmon Survey	·	950 m	MPC · JPL
435722	2008 UJ_{53}	—	September 22, 2008	Mount Lemmon	Mount Lemmon Survey	·	1.8 km	MPC · JPL
435723	2008 UP_{61}	—	October 21, 2008	Kitt Peak	Spacewatch	·	1.9 km	MPC · JPL
435724	2008 UR_{73}	—	October 21, 2008	Kitt Peak	Spacewatch	·	1.7 km	MPC · JPL
435725	2008 UC_{77}	—	September 29, 2008	Mount Lemmon	Mount Lemmon Survey	·	2.2 km	MPC · JPL
435726	2008 UY_{77}	—	September 24, 2008	Mount Lemmon	Mount Lemmon Survey	·	1.3 km	MPC · JPL
435727	2008 UU_{78}	—	September 2, 2008	Kitt Peak	Spacewatch	·	2.3 km	MPC · JPL
435728 Yunlin	2008 UA_{84}	Yunlin	October 22, 2008	Lulin	Hsiao, H.-Y., Q. Ye	·	1.6 km	MPC · JPL
435729	2008 UE_{85}	—	October 23, 2008	Kitt Peak	Spacewatch	H	430 m	MPC · JPL
435730	2008 UK_{90}	—	October 27, 2008	Mount Lemmon	Mount Lemmon Survey	AMO	550 m	MPC · JPL
435731	2008 UL_{95}	—	October 1, 2008	Kitt Peak	Spacewatch	(5)	1.0 km	MPC · JPL
435732	2008 UY_{108}	—	October 21, 2008	Kitt Peak	Spacewatch	·	2.2 km	MPC · JPL
435733	2008 UO_{109}	—	September 5, 2008	Kitt Peak	Spacewatch	L4	8.8 km	MPC · JPL
435734	2008 UV_{115}	—	September 30, 2008	Mount Lemmon	Mount Lemmon Survey	·	1.4 km	MPC · JPL
435735	2008 UN_{121}	—	October 22, 2008	Kitt Peak	Spacewatch	·	1.7 km	MPC · JPL
435736	2008 UU_{125}	—	October 22, 2008	Kitt Peak	Spacewatch	·	2.4 km	MPC · JPL
435737	2008 UA_{128}	—	November 3, 2004	Kitt Peak	Spacewatch	·	1.3 km	MPC · JPL
435738	2008 UH_{130}	—	October 2, 2008	Kitt Peak	Spacewatch	·	1.9 km	MPC · JPL
435739	2008 UB_{131}	—	October 9, 2008	Kitt Peak	Spacewatch	·	1.4 km	MPC · JPL
435740	2008 UB_{132}	—	October 23, 2008	Kitt Peak	Spacewatch	·	1.2 km	MPC · JPL
435741	2008 UF_{134}	—	October 1, 2008	Mount Lemmon	Mount Lemmon Survey	·	1.3 km	MPC · JPL
435742	2008 UY_{134}	—	October 23, 2008	Kitt Peak	Spacewatch	·	2.0 km	MPC · JPL
435743	2008 UT_{137}	—	October 23, 2008	Kitt Peak	Spacewatch	·	760 m	MPC · JPL
435744	2008 UB_{144}	—	September 6, 2008	Catalina	CSS	(5)	1.6 km	MPC · JPL
435745	2008 UX_{144}	—	September 22, 2008	Mount Lemmon	Mount Lemmon Survey	·	2.0 km	MPC · JPL
435746	2008 UO_{146}	—	October 23, 2008	Kitt Peak	Spacewatch	·	2.0 km	MPC · JPL
435747	2008 UA_{154}	—	September 22, 2008	Mount Lemmon	Mount Lemmon Survey	·	1.6 km	MPC · JPL
435748	2008 UP_{154}	—	October 23, 2008	Mount Lemmon	Mount Lemmon Survey	MAR	970 m	MPC · JPL
435749	2008 UH_{156}	—	October 23, 2008	Kitt Peak	Spacewatch	·	910 m	MPC · JPL
435750	2008 UA_{160}	—	October 23, 2008	Kitt Peak	Spacewatch	MAR	1.2 km	MPC · JPL
435751	2008 US_{160}	—	October 23, 2008	Kitt Peak	Spacewatch	·	1.9 km	MPC · JPL
435752	2008 UO_{167}	—	October 24, 2008	Kitt Peak	Spacewatch	·	1.5 km	MPC · JPL
435753	2008 UZ_{178}	—	October 24, 2008	Catalina	CSS	EUN	1.4 km	MPC · JPL
435754	2008 UP_{180}	—	October 24, 2008	Kitt Peak	Spacewatch	·	1.7 km	MPC · JPL
435755	2008 UN_{187}	—	October 24, 2008	Kitt Peak	Spacewatch	·	1.4 km	MPC · JPL
435756	2008 UH_{192}	—	October 25, 2008	Catalina	CSS	·	1.5 km	MPC · JPL
435757	2008 UY_{193}	—	September 29, 2008	Mount Lemmon	Mount Lemmon Survey	(5)	3.0 km	MPC · JPL
435758	2008 US_{202}	—	September 23, 2008	Catalina	CSS	·	2.4 km	MPC · JPL
435759	2008 UW_{204}	—	September 23, 2008	Catalina	CSS	·	2.5 km	MPC · JPL
435760	2008 UB_{208}	—	October 9, 2008	Kitt Peak	Spacewatch	·	2.1 km	MPC · JPL
435761	2008 UA_{209}	—	September 22, 2008	Mount Lemmon	Mount Lemmon Survey	·	1.6 km	MPC · JPL
435762	2008 UG_{210}	—	October 23, 2008	Kitt Peak	Spacewatch	·	1.4 km	MPC · JPL
435763	2008 US_{215}	—	October 24, 2008	Catalina	CSS	·	1.8 km	MPC · JPL
435764	2008 UC_{244}	—	October 26, 2008	Kitt Peak	Spacewatch	·	1.9 km	MPC · JPL
435765	2008 UD_{257}	—	October 8, 2008	Catalina	CSS	·	2.1 km	MPC · JPL
435766	2008 UG_{257}	—	October 27, 2008	Kitt Peak	Spacewatch	RAF	1.2 km	MPC · JPL
435767	2008 UM_{261}	—	October 9, 2008	Mount Lemmon	Mount Lemmon Survey	·	1.2 km	MPC · JPL
435768	2008 UU_{261}	—	October 27, 2008	Kitt Peak	Spacewatch	H	670 m	MPC · JPL
435769	2008 UA_{268}	—	September 25, 2008	Kitt Peak	Spacewatch	·	1.9 km	MPC · JPL
435770	2008 UJ_{277}	—	March 24, 2006	Kitt Peak	Spacewatch	NEM	2.2 km	MPC · JPL
435771	2008 UX_{283}	—	October 28, 2008	Kitt Peak	Spacewatch	615	1.4 km	MPC · JPL
435772	2008 UF_{285}	—	September 6, 2008	Mount Lemmon	Mount Lemmon Survey	·	1.4 km	MPC · JPL
435773	2008 UP_{285}	—	October 7, 2008	Kitt Peak	Spacewatch	·	1.3 km	MPC · JPL
435774	2008 US_{287}	—	October 28, 2008	Mount Lemmon	Mount Lemmon Survey	·	1.2 km	MPC · JPL
435775	2008 UC_{292}	—	September 23, 2008	Mount Lemmon	Mount Lemmon Survey	·	1.5 km	MPC · JPL
435776	2008 UM_{295}	—	October 2, 2008	Mount Lemmon	Mount Lemmon Survey	·	1.3 km	MPC · JPL
435777	2008 UV_{297}	—	October 29, 2008	Kitt Peak	Spacewatch	·	1.5 km	MPC · JPL
435778	2008 UK_{300}	—	September 29, 2008	Mount Lemmon	Mount Lemmon Survey	L4	8.5 km	MPC · JPL
435779	2008 UX_{308}	—	October 22, 2008	Kitt Peak	Spacewatch	·	2.1 km	MPC · JPL
435780	2008 UC_{310}	—	October 30, 2008	Catalina	CSS	EUN	1.7 km	MPC · JPL
435781	2008 UD_{310}	—	October 10, 2008	Catalina	CSS	MAR	1.4 km	MPC · JPL
435782	2008 UU_{313}	—	September 29, 2008	Mount Lemmon	Mount Lemmon Survey	·	1.3 km	MPC · JPL
435783	2008 UX_{314}	—	October 30, 2008	Mount Lemmon	Mount Lemmon Survey	WIT	920 m	MPC · JPL
435784	2008 UR_{328}	—	September 24, 2008	Kitt Peak	Spacewatch	·	1.6 km	MPC · JPL
435785	2008 UW_{337}	—	October 20, 2008	Kitt Peak	Spacewatch	·	1.8 km	MPC · JPL
435786	2008 UX_{339}	—	October 23, 2008	Kitt Peak	Spacewatch	·	1.4 km	MPC · JPL
435787	2008 UK_{344}	—	October 30, 2008	Catalina	CSS	EUN	1.3 km	MPC · JPL
435788	2008 UB_{346}	—	October 26, 2008	Mount Lemmon	Mount Lemmon Survey	·	3.0 km	MPC · JPL
435789	2008 UO_{349}	—	September 29, 2008	Kitt Peak	Spacewatch	·	1.3 km	MPC · JPL
435790	2008 UW_{352}	—	October 28, 2008	Kitt Peak	Spacewatch	·	2.1 km	MPC · JPL
435791	2008 UL_{355}	—	October 24, 2008	Kitt Peak	Spacewatch	BRA	1.4 km	MPC · JPL
435792	2008 UO_{358}	—	October 26, 2008	Mount Lemmon	Mount Lemmon Survey	·	1.9 km	MPC · JPL
435793	2008 UZ_{358}	—	October 27, 2008	Kitt Peak	Spacewatch	·	1.3 km	MPC · JPL
435794	2008 UA_{360}	—	October 29, 2008	Kitt Peak	Spacewatch	·	1.3 km	MPC · JPL
435795	2008 UB_{365}	—	October 9, 2008	Catalina	CSS	EUN	1.3 km	MPC · JPL
435796	2008 VE_{4}	—	October 29, 2008	Kitt Peak	Spacewatch	·	2.0 km	MPC · JPL
435797	2008 VM_{4}	—	November 4, 2008	Tzec Maun	E. Schwab	·	1.2 km	MPC · JPL
435798	2008 VL_{6}	—	November 1, 2008	Kitt Peak	Spacewatch	·	1.4 km	MPC · JPL
435799	2008 VU_{11}	—	October 10, 2008	Mount Lemmon	Mount Lemmon Survey	·	1.9 km	MPC · JPL
435800	2008 VA_{18}	—	September 29, 2008	Kitt Peak	Spacewatch	·	1.2 km	MPC · JPL

== 435801–435900 ==
back to top

Designation			Discovery			Properties		Ref
Permanent	Provisional	Named after	Date	Site	Discoverer(s)	Category	Diam.	Ref
435801	2008 VB_{22}	—	November 1, 2008	Mount Lemmon	Mount Lemmon Survey	·	1.4 km	MPC · JPL
435802	2008 VJ_{48}	—	November 3, 2008	Kitt Peak	Spacewatch	·	1.3 km	MPC · JPL
435803	2008 VE_{50}	—	November 4, 2008	Catalina	CSS	MAR	1.3 km	MPC · JPL
435804	2008 VH_{52}	—	September 23, 2008	Kitt Peak	Spacewatch	·	1.6 km	MPC · JPL
435805	2008 VH_{56}	—	November 6, 2008	Mount Lemmon	Mount Lemmon Survey	H	680 m	MPC · JPL
435806	2008 VE_{60}	—	October 22, 2008	Kitt Peak	Spacewatch	·	2.3 km	MPC · JPL
435807	2008 VV_{60}	—	November 8, 2008	Kitt Peak	Spacewatch	(5)	1.2 km	MPC · JPL
435808	2008 VL_{65}	—	October 1, 2008	Mount Lemmon	Mount Lemmon Survey	·	1.5 km	MPC · JPL
435809	2008 VU_{70}	—	November 8, 2008	Kitt Peak	Spacewatch	·	1.6 km	MPC · JPL
435810	2008 VH_{78}	—	November 7, 2008	Mount Lemmon	Mount Lemmon Survey	·	1.5 km	MPC · JPL
435811	2008 WN_{1}	—	November 18, 2008	Socorro	LINEAR	H	670 m	MPC · JPL
435812	2008 WS_{1}	—	November 18, 2008	Socorro	LINEAR	·	1.5 km	MPC · JPL
435813	2008 WG_{10}	—	September 6, 2008	Mount Lemmon	Mount Lemmon Survey	·	1.5 km	MPC · JPL
435814	2008 WN_{16}	—	November 17, 2008	Kitt Peak	Spacewatch	(11882)	1.5 km	MPC · JPL
435815	2008 WW_{17}	—	September 22, 2008	Mount Lemmon	Mount Lemmon Survey	·	1.3 km	MPC · JPL
435816	2008 WF_{23}	—	November 20, 2004	Kitt Peak	Spacewatch	·	1.4 km	MPC · JPL
435817	2008 WN_{31}	—	November 19, 2008	Mount Lemmon	Mount Lemmon Survey	·	1.9 km	MPC · JPL
435818	2008 WL_{32}	—	November 21, 2008	Socorro	LINEAR	H	460 m	MPC · JPL
435819	2008 WJ_{37}	—	November 17, 2008	Kitt Peak	Spacewatch	JUN	1.2 km	MPC · JPL
435820	2008 WL_{37}	—	November 17, 2008	Kitt Peak	Spacewatch	DOR	2.6 km	MPC · JPL
435821	2008 WC_{40}	—	November 17, 2008	Kitt Peak	Spacewatch	·	2.0 km	MPC · JPL
435822	2008 WE_{41}	—	September 27, 2008	Mount Lemmon	Mount Lemmon Survey	·	1.2 km	MPC · JPL
435823	2008 WC_{61}	—	November 23, 2008	Socorro	LINEAR	·	2.4 km	MPC · JPL
435824	2008 WQ_{61}	—	October 23, 2008	Kitt Peak	Spacewatch	·	2.6 km	MPC · JPL
435825	2008 WL_{65}	—	November 17, 2008	Kitt Peak	Spacewatch	·	1.7 km	MPC · JPL
435826	2008 WL_{66}	—	October 21, 2008	Kitt Peak	Spacewatch	·	1.6 km	MPC · JPL
435827	2008 WG_{67}	—	October 3, 2008	Mount Lemmon	Mount Lemmon Survey	·	2.2 km	MPC · JPL
435828	2008 WC_{70}	—	November 6, 2008	Mount Lemmon	Mount Lemmon Survey	THM	2.0 km	MPC · JPL
435829	2008 WF_{70}	—	November 18, 2008	Kitt Peak	Spacewatch	·	1.8 km	MPC · JPL
435830	2008 WB_{75}	—	October 9, 2008	Kitt Peak	Spacewatch	·	2.3 km	MPC · JPL
435831	2008 WL_{75}	—	November 20, 2008	Kitt Peak	Spacewatch	·	2.5 km	MPC · JPL
435832	2008 WP_{75}	—	September 9, 2008	Mount Lemmon	Mount Lemmon Survey	(5)	1.0 km	MPC · JPL
435833	2008 WT_{76}	—	October 25, 2008	Mount Lemmon	Mount Lemmon Survey	MAR	1.1 km	MPC · JPL
435834	2008 WL_{81}	—	November 20, 2008	Kitt Peak	Spacewatch	·	1.9 km	MPC · JPL
435835	2008 WC_{82}	—	November 1, 2008	Kitt Peak	Spacewatch	RAF	1.4 km	MPC · JPL
435836	2008 WD_{83}	—	November 7, 2008	Mount Lemmon	Mount Lemmon Survey	EOS	2.3 km	MPC · JPL
435837	2008 WU_{87}	—	November 21, 2008	Mount Lemmon	Mount Lemmon Survey	·	1.5 km	MPC · JPL
435838	2008 WW_{87}	—	October 6, 2008	Mount Lemmon	Mount Lemmon Survey	·	1.6 km	MPC · JPL
435839	2008 WF_{89}	—	November 21, 2008	Mount Lemmon	Mount Lemmon Survey	HOF	3.5 km	MPC · JPL
435840	2008 WS_{94}	—	October 6, 2008	Mount Lemmon	Mount Lemmon Survey	·	1.8 km	MPC · JPL
435841	2008 WD_{102}	—	October 28, 2008	Socorro	LINEAR	·	1.7 km	MPC · JPL
435842	2008 WA_{105}	—	October 30, 2008	Kitt Peak	Spacewatch	·	1.3 km	MPC · JPL
435843	2008 WC_{106}	—	November 8, 2008	Kitt Peak	Spacewatch	·	2.3 km	MPC · JPL
435844	2008 WW_{112}	—	October 30, 2008	Kitt Peak	Spacewatch	·	2.5 km	MPC · JPL
435845	2008 WQ_{114}	—	October 31, 2008	Kitt Peak	Spacewatch	·	1.5 km	MPC · JPL
435846	2008 WT_{117}	—	November 22, 2008	Kitt Peak	Spacewatch	EUN	1.4 km	MPC · JPL
435847	2008 WL_{118}	—	November 30, 2008	Mount Lemmon	Mount Lemmon Survey	·	1.6 km	MPC · JPL
435848	2008 WJ_{123}	—	November 30, 2008	Kitt Peak	Spacewatch	·	1.9 km	MPC · JPL
435849	2008 WF_{128}	—	November 19, 2008	Mount Lemmon	Mount Lemmon Survey	·	1.5 km	MPC · JPL
435850	2008 WC_{129}	—	November 24, 2008	Mount Lemmon	Mount Lemmon Survey	JUN	1.3 km	MPC · JPL
435851	2008 WS_{132}	—	October 1, 2008	Catalina	CSS	·	1.5 km	MPC · JPL
435852	2008 WF_{135}	—	November 18, 2008	Socorro	LINEAR	·	1.8 km	MPC · JPL
435853	2008 WL_{135}	—	November 18, 2008	Kitt Peak	Spacewatch	·	1.8 km	MPC · JPL
435854	2008 WQ_{136}	—	November 20, 2008	Kitt Peak	Spacewatch	·	3.4 km	MPC · JPL
435855	2008 WK_{138}	—	November 17, 1999	Catalina	CSS	EUN	1.4 km	MPC · JPL
435856	2008 WV_{138}	—	November 21, 2008	Mount Lemmon	Mount Lemmon Survey	·	2.2 km	MPC · JPL
435857	2008 WP_{140}	—	November 18, 2008	Catalina	CSS	·	2.3 km	MPC · JPL
435858	2008 XR_{12}	—	November 9, 2008	Mount Lemmon	Mount Lemmon Survey	MAR	1.2 km	MPC · JPL
435859	2008 XZ_{29}	—	October 28, 2008	Catalina	CSS	·	2.0 km	MPC · JPL
435860	2008 XV_{30}	—	December 2, 2008	Kitt Peak	Spacewatch	AGN	950 m	MPC · JPL
435861	2008 XE_{39}	—	November 19, 2008	Mount Lemmon	Mount Lemmon Survey	·	1.5 km	MPC · JPL
435862	2008 XW_{43}	—	December 2, 2008	Kitt Peak	Spacewatch	T_{j} (2.99)	3.6 km	MPC · JPL
435863	2008 YC_{2}	—	December 20, 2008	Socorro	LINEAR	H	770 m	MPC · JPL
435864	2008 YZ_{8}	—	December 23, 2008	Piszkéstető	K. Sárneczky	HOF	2.5 km	MPC · JPL
435865	2008 YP_{12}	—	November 19, 2008	Mount Lemmon	Mount Lemmon Survey	·	2.3 km	MPC · JPL
435866	2008 YX_{26}	—	October 27, 2003	Kitt Peak	Spacewatch	·	2.3 km	MPC · JPL
435867	2008 YH_{46}	—	December 29, 2008	Mount Lemmon	Mount Lemmon Survey	·	1.6 km	MPC · JPL
435868	2008 YO_{48}	—	December 29, 2008	Mount Lemmon	Mount Lemmon Survey	·	1.4 km	MPC · JPL
435869	2008 YS_{49}	—	December 29, 2008	Mount Lemmon	Mount Lemmon Survey	EOS	1.8 km	MPC · JPL
435870	2008 YM_{55}	—	December 21, 2008	Mount Lemmon	Mount Lemmon Survey	EOS	1.6 km	MPC · JPL
435871	2008 YH_{58}	—	September 13, 2007	Mount Lemmon	Mount Lemmon Survey	EUN	1.1 km	MPC · JPL
435872	2008 YB_{78}	—	December 30, 2008	Mount Lemmon	Mount Lemmon Survey	·	2.0 km	MPC · JPL
435873	2008 YX_{99}	—	December 29, 2008	Kitt Peak	Spacewatch	·	1.7 km	MPC · JPL
435874	2008 YJ_{101}	—	September 11, 2007	Catalina	CSS	·	2.0 km	MPC · JPL
435875	2008 YW_{115}	—	December 21, 2008	Mount Lemmon	Mount Lemmon Survey	AGN	1.3 km	MPC · JPL
435876	2008 YG_{122}	—	December 30, 2008	Kitt Peak	Spacewatch	DOR	2.8 km	MPC · JPL
435877	2008 YE_{128}	—	December 21, 2008	Kitt Peak	Spacewatch	·	1.5 km	MPC · JPL
435878	2008 YD_{130}	—	December 4, 2008	Mount Lemmon	Mount Lemmon Survey	·	2.2 km	MPC · JPL
435879	2008 YC_{135}	—	December 30, 2008	Kitt Peak	Spacewatch	·	1.6 km	MPC · JPL
435880	2008 YZ_{137}	—	December 30, 2008	Kitt Peak	Spacewatch	·	1.8 km	MPC · JPL
435881	2008 YV_{138}	—	December 30, 2008	Mount Lemmon	Mount Lemmon Survey	GEF	1.3 km	MPC · JPL
435882	2008 YT_{144}	—	December 30, 2008	Kitt Peak	Spacewatch	·	2.0 km	MPC · JPL
435883	2008 YE_{157}	—	December 22, 2008	Kitt Peak	Spacewatch	·	2.2 km	MPC · JPL
435884	2008 YK_{159}	—	December 30, 2008	Mount Lemmon	Mount Lemmon Survey	·	3.0 km	MPC · JPL
435885	2008 YA_{160}	—	December 30, 2008	Catalina	CSS	·	1.1 km	MPC · JPL
435886	2008 YL_{160}	—	December 30, 2008	Mount Lemmon	Mount Lemmon Survey	·	4.5 km	MPC · JPL
435887	2008 YX_{162}	—	December 22, 2008	Mount Lemmon	Mount Lemmon Survey	·	2.6 km	MPC · JPL
435888	2008 YJ_{165}	—	November 21, 2008	Catalina	CSS	·	3.0 km	MPC · JPL
435889	2008 YU_{168}	—	December 21, 2008	Kitt Peak	Spacewatch	·	1.7 km	MPC · JPL
435890	2008 YT_{169}	—	December 31, 2008	Mount Lemmon	Mount Lemmon Survey	·	1.9 km	MPC · JPL
435891	2008 YD_{172}	—	December 30, 2008	Mount Lemmon	Mount Lemmon Survey	EUN	1.5 km	MPC · JPL
435892	2009 AE_{8}	—	January 2, 2009	Catalina	CSS	·	2.3 km	MPC · JPL
435893	2009 AV_{12}	—	December 22, 2008	Mount Lemmon	Mount Lemmon Survey	KOR	1.3 km	MPC · JPL
435894	2009 AL_{26}	—	January 2, 2009	Kitt Peak	Spacewatch	·	1.4 km	MPC · JPL
435895	2009 AN_{30}	—	January 15, 2009	Kitt Peak	Spacewatch	·	1.5 km	MPC · JPL
435896	2009 AA_{34}	—	December 29, 2008	Mount Lemmon	Mount Lemmon Survey	·	1.7 km	MPC · JPL
435897	2009 AP_{37}	—	January 15, 2009	Kitt Peak	Spacewatch	·	2.8 km	MPC · JPL
435898	2009 AT_{44}	—	January 15, 2009	Kitt Peak	Spacewatch	·	2.0 km	MPC · JPL
435899	2009 AG_{45}	—	January 15, 2009	Kitt Peak	Spacewatch	EOS	1.6 km	MPC · JPL
435900	2009 AM_{46}	—	January 1, 2009	Kitt Peak	Spacewatch	·	2.1 km	MPC · JPL

== 435901–436000 ==
back to top

Designation			Discovery			Properties		Ref
Permanent	Provisional	Named after	Date	Site	Discoverer(s)	Category	Diam.	Ref
435901	2009 BU	—	January 16, 2009	Mayhill	Lowe, A.	·	1.8 km	MPC · JPL
435902	2009 BZ_{1}	—	January 17, 2009	Catalina	CSS	·	3.4 km	MPC · JPL
435903	2009 BC_{7}	—	January 18, 2009	Socorro	LINEAR	·	2.7 km	MPC · JPL
435904	2009 BK_{9}	—	January 18, 2009	Socorro	LINEAR	H	670 m	MPC · JPL
435905	2009 BN_{10}	—	January 22, 2009	Mayhill	Lowe, A.	H	610 m	MPC · JPL
435906	2009 BD_{14}	—	January 28, 2009	Tzec Maun	Tozzi, F.	H	840 m	MPC · JPL
435907	2009 BV_{24}	—	January 17, 2009	Kitt Peak	Spacewatch	LIX	3.9 km	MPC · JPL
435908	2009 BL_{29}	—	November 23, 2008	Mount Lemmon	Mount Lemmon Survey	·	2.4 km	MPC · JPL
435909	2009 BB_{50}	—	January 16, 2009	Mount Lemmon	Mount Lemmon Survey	·	1.7 km	MPC · JPL
435910	2009 BU_{52}	—	January 16, 2009	Mount Lemmon	Mount Lemmon Survey	·	2.7 km	MPC · JPL
435911	2009 BE_{57}	—	January 18, 2009	Mount Lemmon	Mount Lemmon Survey	·	2.1 km	MPC · JPL
435912	2009 BT_{64}	—	January 20, 2009	Catalina	CSS	·	2.3 km	MPC · JPL
435913	2009 BR_{73}	—	January 30, 2009	Wildberg	R. Apitzsch	·	2.7 km	MPC · JPL
435914	2009 BX_{81}	—	January 29, 2009	Wildberg	R. Apitzsch	·	3.4 km	MPC · JPL
435915	2009 BW_{82}	—	January 20, 2009	Catalina	CSS	·	3.9 km	MPC · JPL
435916	2009 BO_{92}	—	January 25, 2009	Kitt Peak	Spacewatch	·	2.1 km	MPC · JPL
435917	2009 BE_{94}	—	January 25, 2009	Kitt Peak	Spacewatch	·	1.5 km	MPC · JPL
435918	2009 BN_{97}	—	January 25, 2009	Catalina	CSS	·	2.1 km	MPC · JPL
435919	2009 BU_{98}	—	January 26, 2009	Kitt Peak	Spacewatch	·	2.1 km	MPC · JPL
435920	2009 BW_{98}	—	January 26, 2009	Mount Lemmon	Mount Lemmon Survey	·	3.1 km	MPC · JPL
435921	2009 BX_{105}	—	January 25, 2009	Kitt Peak	Spacewatch	EMA	3.8 km	MPC · JPL
435922	2009 BL_{114}	—	December 1, 2008	Mount Lemmon	Mount Lemmon Survey	·	1.9 km	MPC · JPL
435923	2009 BQ_{114}	—	January 26, 2009	Kitt Peak	Spacewatch	·	3.7 km	MPC · JPL
435924	2009 BL_{128}	—	November 13, 2007	Mount Lemmon	Mount Lemmon Survey	·	1.9 km	MPC · JPL
435925	2009 BF_{136}	—	November 17, 2007	Mount Lemmon	Mount Lemmon Survey	·	2.9 km	MPC · JPL
435926	2009 BZ_{137}	—	January 29, 2009	Kitt Peak	Spacewatch	THM	2.1 km	MPC · JPL
435927	2009 BL_{139}	—	January 29, 2009	Kitt Peak	Spacewatch	·	1.3 km	MPC · JPL
435928	2009 BA_{140}	—	January 29, 2009	Kitt Peak	Spacewatch	AST	1.8 km	MPC · JPL
435929	2009 BG_{141}	—	November 18, 2007	Mount Lemmon	Mount Lemmon Survey	KOR	1.4 km	MPC · JPL
435930	2009 BY_{144}	—	January 30, 2009	Kitt Peak	Spacewatch	·	2.0 km	MPC · JPL
435931	2009 BM_{150}	—	January 25, 2009	Kitt Peak	Spacewatch	·	2.2 km	MPC · JPL
435932	2009 BQ_{152}	—	December 21, 2008	Kitt Peak	Spacewatch	NAE	1.8 km	MPC · JPL
435933	2009 BV_{164}	—	March 18, 2004	Kitt Peak	Spacewatch	·	2.1 km	MPC · JPL
435934	2009 BT_{168}	—	January 31, 2009	Cerro Burek	Burek, Cerro	·	2.3 km	MPC · JPL
435935	2009 BF_{171}	—	January 17, 2009	Kitt Peak	Spacewatch	·	3.2 km	MPC · JPL
435936	2009 BD_{177}	—	January 25, 2009	Kitt Peak	Spacewatch	EOS	1.6 km	MPC · JPL
435937	2009 BS_{179}	—	January 18, 2009	Kitt Peak	Spacewatch	·	2.4 km	MPC · JPL
435938	2009 CP_{3}	—	February 2, 2009	Moletai	K. Černis, Zdanavicius, J.	·	2.3 km	MPC · JPL
435939	2009 CG_{10}	—	February 1, 2009	Mount Lemmon	Mount Lemmon Survey	·	3.6 km	MPC · JPL
435940	2009 CE_{24}	—	February 1, 2009	Kitt Peak	Spacewatch	EOS	1.7 km	MPC · JPL
435941	2009 CW_{25}	—	February 1, 2009	Kitt Peak	Spacewatch	·	2.4 km	MPC · JPL
435942	2009 CW_{26}	—	January 17, 2009	Kitt Peak	Spacewatch	·	3.2 km	MPC · JPL
435943	2009 CE_{40}	—	February 14, 2009	Heppenheim	Starkenburg	·	1.9 km	MPC · JPL
435944	2009 CH_{52}	—	February 14, 2009	Mount Lemmon	Mount Lemmon Survey	·	2.8 km	MPC · JPL
435945	2009 CY_{53}	—	February 14, 2009	Catalina	CSS	T_{j} (2.98)	4.1 km	MPC · JPL
435946	2009 CT_{56}	—	February 4, 2009	Kitt Peak	Spacewatch	·	2.4 km	MPC · JPL
435947	2009 CE_{58}	—	February 3, 2009	Mount Lemmon	Mount Lemmon Survey	·	2.3 km	MPC · JPL
435948	2009 CQ_{64}	—	February 4, 2009	Mount Lemmon	Mount Lemmon Survey	·	3.3 km	MPC · JPL
435949	2009 DO_{3}	—	February 19, 2009	Magdalena Ridge	Ryan, W. H.	·	3.8 km	MPC · JPL
435950 Bad Königshofen	2009 DL_{10}	Bad Königshofen	February 21, 2009	Calar Alto	F. Hormuth	·	3.4 km	MPC · JPL
435951	2009 DG_{11}	—	February 17, 2009	Dauban	Kugel, F.	HYG	2.9 km	MPC · JPL
435952	2009 DS_{17}	—	February 19, 2009	Mount Lemmon	Mount Lemmon Survey	·	1.8 km	MPC · JPL
435953	2009 DM_{20}	—	February 17, 2009	Kitt Peak	Spacewatch	·	1.3 km	MPC · JPL
435954	2009 DX_{24}	—	February 21, 2009	Mount Lemmon	Mount Lemmon Survey	·	2.6 km	MPC · JPL
435955	2009 DU_{30}	—	February 23, 2009	Calar Alto	F. Hormuth	·	2.8 km	MPC · JPL
435956	2009 DB_{32}	—	February 20, 2009	Kitt Peak	Spacewatch	·	2.8 km	MPC · JPL
435957	2009 DT_{38}	—	February 24, 2009	Calar Alto	F. Hormuth	·	2.9 km	MPC · JPL
435958	2009 DP_{39}	—	February 3, 2009	Mount Lemmon	Mount Lemmon Survey	·	2.5 km	MPC · JPL
435959	2009 DA_{40}	—	February 20, 2009	Dauban	Kugel, F.	EOS	1.9 km	MPC · JPL
435960	2009 DZ_{43}	—	January 31, 2009	Kitt Peak	Spacewatch	EOS	1.8 km	MPC · JPL
435961	2009 DU_{48}	—	February 19, 2009	Kitt Peak	Spacewatch	·	1.9 km	MPC · JPL
435962	2009 DQ_{53}	—	February 5, 2009	Kitt Peak	Spacewatch	EOS	1.7 km	MPC · JPL
435963	2009 DH_{54}	—	January 16, 2009	Kitt Peak	Spacewatch	EOS	1.8 km	MPC · JPL
435964	2009 DK_{57}	—	February 22, 2009	Kitt Peak	Spacewatch	EOS	2.2 km	MPC · JPL
435965	2009 DK_{59}	—	March 16, 2004	Kitt Peak	Spacewatch	·	2.9 km	MPC · JPL
435966	2009 DQ_{62}	—	January 31, 2009	Kitt Peak	Spacewatch	·	2.1 km	MPC · JPL
435967	2009 DT_{66}	—	February 24, 2009	Mount Lemmon	Mount Lemmon Survey	·	2.2 km	MPC · JPL
435968	2009 DO_{69}	—	January 31, 2009	Kitt Peak	Spacewatch	·	2.8 km	MPC · JPL
435969	2009 DB_{71}	—	February 17, 2009	La Sagra	OAM	·	2.3 km	MPC · JPL
435970	2009 DY_{75}	—	December 30, 2008	Mount Lemmon	Mount Lemmon Survey	·	2.0 km	MPC · JPL
435971	2009 DJ_{80}	—	September 14, 2006	Kitt Peak	Spacewatch	(21885)	2.8 km	MPC · JPL
435972	2009 DY_{80}	—	February 24, 2009	Kitt Peak	Spacewatch	EOS	2.3 km	MPC · JPL
435973	2009 DR_{81}	—	February 24, 2009	Kitt Peak	Spacewatch	·	3.0 km	MPC · JPL
435974	2009 DB_{82}	—	February 24, 2009	Kitt Peak	Spacewatch	·	3.0 km	MPC · JPL
435975	2009 DH_{82}	—	February 24, 2009	Kitt Peak	Spacewatch	HYG	2.6 km	MPC · JPL
435976	2009 DY_{84}	—	February 26, 2009	Kitt Peak	Spacewatch	HYG	3.0 km	MPC · JPL
435977	2009 DB_{93}	—	February 28, 2009	Mount Lemmon	Mount Lemmon Survey	·	2.8 km	MPC · JPL
435978	2009 DP_{94}	—	February 28, 2009	Mount Lemmon	Mount Lemmon Survey	·	2.7 km	MPC · JPL
435979	2009 DG_{113}	—	November 18, 2007	Mount Lemmon	Mount Lemmon Survey	THM	1.8 km	MPC · JPL
435980	2009 DE_{117}	—	February 27, 2009	Kitt Peak	Spacewatch	TIR	2.7 km	MPC · JPL
435981	2009 DT_{127}	—	February 20, 2009	Kitt Peak	Spacewatch	·	3.8 km	MPC · JPL
435982	2009 DC_{130}	—	February 27, 2009	Kitt Peak	Spacewatch	·	2.3 km	MPC · JPL
435983	2009 DX_{131}	—	February 20, 2009	Kitt Peak	Spacewatch	·	2.8 km	MPC · JPL
435984	2009 EA_{5}	—	March 1, 2009	Kitt Peak	Spacewatch	·	3.5 km	MPC · JPL
435985	2009 ED_{7}	—	March 2, 2009	Mount Lemmon	Mount Lemmon Survey	·	1.9 km	MPC · JPL
435986	2009 EO_{8}	—	March 2, 2009	Mount Lemmon	Mount Lemmon Survey	·	3.3 km	MPC · JPL
435987	2009 EM_{12}	—	March 1, 2009	Mount Lemmon	Mount Lemmon Survey	·	2.5 km	MPC · JPL
435988	2009 EG_{15}	—	March 15, 2009	Kitt Peak	Spacewatch	·	1.6 km	MPC · JPL
435989	2009 ER_{18}	—	February 19, 2009	Kitt Peak	Spacewatch	·	2.9 km	MPC · JPL
435990	2009 EL_{20}	—	March 3, 2009	Catalina	CSS	EMA	3.5 km	MPC · JPL
435991	2009 ET_{20}	—	February 3, 2009	Mount Lemmon	Mount Lemmon Survey	·	4.5 km	MPC · JPL
435992	2009 FE_{11}	—	February 4, 2009	Kitt Peak	Spacewatch	·	2.1 km	MPC · JPL
435993	2009 FL_{11}	—	March 17, 2009	Kitt Peak	Spacewatch	H	600 m	MPC · JPL
435994	2009 FM_{11}	—	March 17, 2009	Kitt Peak	Spacewatch	EOS	1.6 km	MPC · JPL
435995	2009 FL_{13}	—	March 18, 2009	Mount Lemmon	Mount Lemmon Survey	EOS	2.1 km	MPC · JPL
435996	2009 FS_{17}	—	February 26, 2009	Kitt Peak	Spacewatch	·	3.1 km	MPC · JPL
435997	2009 FB_{25}	—	March 18, 2009	Catalina	CSS	·	1.3 km	MPC · JPL
435998	2009 FP_{40}	—	March 17, 2009	Kitt Peak	Spacewatch	·	2.6 km	MPC · JPL
435999	2009 FE_{41}	—	March 21, 2009	Bergisch Gladbach	W. Bickel	(1118)	2.8 km	MPC · JPL
436000	2009 FE_{46}	—	March 17, 2009	Uccle	Uccle	EOS	2.2 km	MPC · JPL

back to top

== Meaning of names ==
As minor planet discoveries are confirmed, they are given a permanent number by the IAU's Minor Planet Center (MPC), and the discoverers can then submit names for them, following the IAU's naming conventions. The list below concerns those minor planets in the specified number-range that have received names, and explains the meanings of those names.

Official naming citations of newly named small Solar System bodies are approved and published in a bulletin by IAU's Working Group for Small Bodies Nomenclature (WGSBN). Before May 2021, citations were published in MPC's Minor Planet Circulars for many decades. Recent citations can also be found on the JPL Small-Body Database (SBDB). Until his death in 2016, German astronomer Lutz D. Schmadel compiled these citations into the Dictionary of Minor Planet Names (DMP) and regularly updated the collection.

Based on Paul Herget's The Names of the Minor Planets, Schmadel also researched the unclear origin of numerous asteroids, most of which had been named prior to World War II. This article incorporates text from this source, which is in the public domain: SBDB New namings may only be added to this list below after official publication as the preannouncement of names is condemned. The WGSBN publishes a comprehensive guideline for the naming rules of non-cometary small Solar System bodies. 8

Named minor planet	Provisional	This minor planet was named for...	Ref · Catalog
435127 Virtelpro	2007 EE_{88}	The Virtual Telescope Project, part of the Bellatrix Astronomical Observatory in Italy, is a remotely accessible research facility with robotic telescopes. Since 2006, it shares online images of astronomical events in real-time, including observations of transient near-Earth objects.	IAU · 435127
435186 Jovellanos	2007 RJ_{35}	Gaspar Melchor de Jovellanos (1744–1811), a Spanish statesman, philosopher, author, and major figure of the Enlightenment in Spain.	IAU · 435186
435552 Morin	2008 QM_{14}	Julien Morin (born 1983), a French astrophysicist and a lecturer at the University of Montpellier.	JPL · 435552
435728 Yunlin	2008 UA_{84}	Yunlin County, a county in western Taiwan.	JPL · 435728
435950 Bad Königshofen	2009 DL_{10}	The city of Bad Königshofen is a spa town in the Franconian part of the Grabfeld region in Bavaria, Germany.	JPL · 435950
