= Meanings of minor-planet names: 384001–385000 =

As minor planet discoveries are confirmed, they are given a permanent number by the IAU's Minor Planet Center (MPC), and the discoverers can then submit names for them, following the IAU's naming conventions. The list below concerns those minor planets in the specified number-range that have received names, and explains the meanings of those names.

Official naming citations of newly named small Solar System bodies are approved and published in a bulletin by IAU's Working Group for Small Bodies Nomenclature (WGSBN). Before May 2021, citations were published in MPC's Minor Planet Circulars for many decades. Recent citations can also be found on the JPL Small-Body Database (SBDB). Until his death in 2016, German astronomer Lutz D. Schmadel compiled these citations into the Dictionary of Minor Planet Names (DMP) and regularly updated the collection.

Based on Paul Herget's The Names of the Minor Planets, Schmadel also researched the unclear origin of numerous asteroids, most of which had been named prior to World War II. This article incorporates text from this source, which is in the public domain: SBDB New namings may only be added to this list below after official publication as the preannouncement of names is condemned. The WGSBN publishes a comprehensive guideline for the naming rules of non-cometary small Solar System bodies.

== 384001–384100 ==
Named minor planet	Provisional	This minor planet was named for...	Ref · Catalog
There are no named minor planets in this number range

== 384101–384200 ==
back to top

Named minor planet	Provisional	This minor planet was named for...	Ref · Catalog
There are no named minor planets in this number range

== 384201–384300 ==
back to top

Named minor planet	Provisional	This minor planet was named for...	Ref · Catalog
384282 Evgeniyegorov	2009 QU_{38}	Evgeniy Mikhaylovich Egorov (born 1945) is an expert designer. He has created more than 1500 symbols and logos, including coats of arms and product branding. He is an honorary academician of the Russian Academy of Arts and a member of "the World club of Petersburgers".	JPL · 384282

== 384301–384400 ==
back to top

Named minor planet	Provisional	This minor planet was named for...	Ref · Catalog
There are no named minor planets in this number range

== 384401–384500 ==
back to top

Named minor planet	Provisional	This minor planet was named for...	Ref · Catalog
There are no named minor planets in this number range

== 384501–384600 ==
back to top

Named minor planet	Provisional	This minor planet was named for...	Ref · Catalog
384533 Tenerelli	2010 DT_{56}	Domenick Tenerelli (born 1935), an American engineer	JPL · 384533
384582 Juliasmith	2010 JS_{14}	Julia Smith (born 1984), an American expert in federal relations at the University of Arizona and former Assistant Vice President at the Association of American Universities (Src).	IAU · 384582
384584 Jenniferlawrence	2010 JL_{85}	Jennifer Lawrence (born 1990), American actress and feminist	IAU · 384584

== 384601–384700 ==
back to top

Named minor planet	Provisional	This minor planet was named for...	Ref · Catalog
There are no named minor planets in this number range

== 384701–384800 ==
back to top

Named minor planet	Provisional	This minor planet was named for...	Ref · Catalog
There are no named minor planets in this number range

== 384801–384900 ==
back to top

Named minor planet	Provisional	This minor planet was named for...	Ref · Catalog
384815 Żołnowski	2012 RC_{3}	Michał Żołnowski (born 1975), a Polish amateur astronomer, astrophotographer and discoverer of minor planets	JPL · 384815

== 384901–385000 ==
back to top

Named minor planet	Provisional	This minor planet was named for...	Ref · Catalog
There are no named minor planets in this number range

back to top

Preceded by 383,001–384,000	Meanings of minor-planet names List of minor planets: 384,001–385,000	Succeeded by 385,001–386,000
