= List of minor planets: 384001–385000 =

The following is a partial list of minor planets, running from minor-planet number 384001 through 385000, inclusive. The primary data for this and other partial lists is based on JPL's "Small-Body Orbital Elements" and data available from the Minor Planet Center. Critical list information is also provided by the MPC, unless otherwise specified from Lowell Observatory. A detailed description of the table's columns and additional sources are given on the main page including a complete list of every page in this series, and a statistical break-up on the dynamical classification of minor planets.

Also see the summary list of all named bodies in numerical and alphabetical order, and the corresponding naming citations for the number range of this particular list. New namings may only be added to this list after official publication, as the preannouncement of names is condemned by the Working Group for Small Bodies Nomenclature of the International Astronomical Union.

Near-Earth obj.	MBA (inner)	MBA (outer)	Centaur
Mars-crosser	MBA (middle)	Jupiter trojan	Trans-Neptunian obj.
Unclassified

== 384001–384100 ==
Designation			Discovery			Properties		Ref
Permanent	Provisional	Named after	Date	Site	Discoverer(s)	Category	Diam.	Ref
384001	2008 UP_{24}	—	October 20, 2008	Kitt Peak	Spacewatch	·	1.2 km	MPC · JPL
384002	2008 UB_{34}	—	October 20, 2008	Kitt Peak	Spacewatch	GEF ·	3.2 km	MPC · JPL
384003	2008 UA_{37}	—	October 20, 2008	Kitt Peak	Spacewatch	·	4.5 km	MPC · JPL
384004	2008 UW_{37}	—	September 19, 2003	Kitt Peak	Spacewatch	·	1.6 km	MPC · JPL
384005	2008 UT_{45}	—	October 20, 2008	Mount Lemmon	Mount Lemmon Survey	·	2.1 km	MPC · JPL
384006	2008 UA_{51}	—	October 20, 2008	Mount Lemmon	Mount Lemmon Survey	·	1.3 km	MPC · JPL
384007	2008 UX_{52}	—	October 20, 2008	Mount Lemmon	Mount Lemmon Survey	·	2.1 km	MPC · JPL
384008	2008 UZ_{55}	—	September 23, 2008	Kitt Peak	Spacewatch	EUN	1.3 km	MPC · JPL
384009	2008 UV_{64}	—	October 21, 2008	Kitt Peak	Spacewatch	·	1.9 km	MPC · JPL
384010	2008 UZ_{64}	—	October 1, 2003	Kitt Peak	Spacewatch	GEF	1.6 km	MPC · JPL
384011	2008 UG_{65}	—	October 21, 2008	Kitt Peak	Spacewatch	·	1.8 km	MPC · JPL
384012	2008 UA_{67}	—	October 21, 2008	Kitt Peak	Spacewatch	AEO	1.0 km	MPC · JPL
384013	2008 UG_{67}	—	October 21, 2008	Kitt Peak	Spacewatch	·	1.9 km	MPC · JPL
384014	2008 UL_{67}	—	October 21, 2008	Kitt Peak	Spacewatch	·	1.9 km	MPC · JPL
384015	2008 UL_{73}	—	October 21, 2008	Kitt Peak	Spacewatch	·	1.9 km	MPC · JPL
384016	2008 UO_{73}	—	October 21, 2008	Kitt Peak	Spacewatch	·	1.8 km	MPC · JPL
384017	2008 UN_{84}	—	October 23, 2008	Kitt Peak	Spacewatch	AGN	940 m	MPC · JPL
384018	2008 UH_{88}	—	October 8, 2008	Kitt Peak	Spacewatch	·	1.2 km	MPC · JPL
384019	2008 UL_{92}	—	September 29, 2008	Catalina	CSS	·	2.3 km	MPC · JPL
384020	2008 UO_{95}	—	October 22, 2008	Lulin	LUSS	·	2.4 km	MPC · JPL
384021	2008 UF_{97}	—	October 25, 2008	Socorro	LINEAR	·	1.7 km	MPC · JPL
384022	2008 UN_{99}	—	September 24, 2008	Mount Lemmon	Mount Lemmon Survey	·	1.9 km	MPC · JPL
384023	2008 UE_{100}	—	October 27, 2008	Bisei SG Center	BATTeRS	·	1.8 km	MPC · JPL
384024	2008 UJ_{102}	—	October 6, 2008	Kitt Peak	Spacewatch	·	1.9 km	MPC · JPL
384025	2008 UE_{110}	—	October 22, 2008	Kitt Peak	Spacewatch	·	2.8 km	MPC · JPL
384026	2008 UT_{113}	—	October 22, 2008	Kitt Peak	Spacewatch	·	1.7 km	MPC · JPL
384027	2008 UA_{116}	—	October 22, 2008	Kitt Peak	Spacewatch	·	1.9 km	MPC · JPL
384028	2008 UE_{119}	—	October 22, 2008	Kitt Peak	Spacewatch	·	2.0 km	MPC · JPL
384029	2008 UO_{122}	—	October 22, 2008	Kitt Peak	Spacewatch	·	1.9 km	MPC · JPL
384030	2008 UK_{128}	—	October 22, 2008	Kitt Peak	Spacewatch	·	2.5 km	MPC · JPL
384031	2008 UC_{142}	—	October 2, 2008	Mount Lemmon	Mount Lemmon Survey	EOS	2.1 km	MPC · JPL
384032	2008 UF_{148}	—	October 23, 2008	Kitt Peak	Spacewatch	·	1.7 km	MPC · JPL
384033	2008 UY_{154}	—	October 23, 2008	Mount Lemmon	Mount Lemmon Survey	AGN	1.1 km	MPC · JPL
384034	2008 UM_{155}	—	April 8, 2002	Kitt Peak	Spacewatch	·	1.5 km	MPC · JPL
384035	2008 UW_{156}	—	October 23, 2008	Mount Lemmon	Mount Lemmon Survey	KOR	1.3 km	MPC · JPL
384036	2008 UL_{166}	—	October 24, 2008	Kitt Peak	Spacewatch	AGN	1.2 km	MPC · JPL
384037	2008 UV_{170}	—	October 24, 2008	Kitt Peak	Spacewatch	·	1.9 km	MPC · JPL
384038	2008 UP_{172}	—	October 24, 2008	Kitt Peak	Spacewatch	·	1.5 km	MPC · JPL
384039	2008 UE_{178}	—	September 22, 2008	Kitt Peak	Spacewatch	·	1.8 km	MPC · JPL
384040	2008 UF_{182}	—	October 24, 2008	Mount Lemmon	Mount Lemmon Survey	·	1.6 km	MPC · JPL
384041	2008 UO_{189}	—	October 25, 2008	Mount Lemmon	Mount Lemmon Survey	·	2.3 km	MPC · JPL
384042	2008 UU_{193}	—	October 25, 2008	Mount Lemmon	Mount Lemmon Survey	·	1.9 km	MPC · JPL
384043	2008 UT_{194}	—	September 22, 2008	Mount Lemmon	Mount Lemmon Survey	·	1.9 km	MPC · JPL
384044	2008 UD_{203}	—	October 28, 2008	Socorro	LINEAR	·	1.8 km	MPC · JPL
384045	2008 UY_{204}	—	October 26, 2008	Tzec Maun	R. Apitzsch	·	1.7 km	MPC · JPL
384046	2008 UH_{205}	—	September 6, 2008	Siding Spring	SSS	·	2.4 km	MPC · JPL
384047	2008 UR_{207}	—	October 23, 2008	Kitt Peak	Spacewatch	·	1.9 km	MPC · JPL
384048	2008 UR_{215}	—	October 24, 2008	Catalina	CSS	·	2.5 km	MPC · JPL
384049	2008 UW_{217}	—	October 25, 2008	Kitt Peak	Spacewatch	·	2.0 km	MPC · JPL
384050	2008 UE_{234}	—	October 26, 2008	Mount Lemmon	Mount Lemmon Survey	·	1.4 km	MPC · JPL
384051	2008 UX_{241}	—	October 1, 2008	Catalina	CSS	·	2.6 km	MPC · JPL
384052	2008 UD_{248}	—	October 26, 2008	Kitt Peak	Spacewatch	·	1.9 km	MPC · JPL
384053	2008 UK_{256}	—	October 27, 2008	Kitt Peak	Spacewatch	MRX	1.0 km	MPC · JPL
384054	2008 UJ_{265}	—	October 28, 2008	Kitt Peak	Spacewatch	·	2.2 km	MPC · JPL
384055	2008 UZ_{271}	—	October 28, 2008	Kitt Peak	Spacewatch	·	1.7 km	MPC · JPL
384056	2008 UU_{274}	—	October 28, 2008	Kitt Peak	Spacewatch	AGN	1.3 km	MPC · JPL
384057	2008 UA_{276}	—	October 28, 2008	Mount Lemmon	Mount Lemmon Survey	·	1.6 km	MPC · JPL
384058	2008 UH_{280}	—	October 8, 2008	Catalina	CSS	·	2.0 km	MPC · JPL
384059	2008 UE_{288}	—	October 28, 2008	Mount Lemmon	Mount Lemmon Survey	·	2.1 km	MPC · JPL
384060	2008 UB_{289}	—	September 26, 2008	Kitt Peak	Spacewatch	·	1.5 km	MPC · JPL
384061	2008 UK_{301}	—	April 16, 2007	Siding Spring	SSS	·	1.8 km	MPC · JPL
384062	2008 UD_{304}	—	October 29, 2008	Kitt Peak	Spacewatch	(12739)	1.6 km	MPC · JPL
384063	2008 UA_{317}	—	October 30, 2008	Kitt Peak	Spacewatch	EMA	4.3 km	MPC · JPL
384064	2008 UV_{317}	—	September 18, 2003	Kitt Peak	Spacewatch	·	2.0 km	MPC · JPL
384065	2008 UL_{336}	—	October 22, 2008	Kitt Peak	Spacewatch	·	2.6 km	MPC · JPL
384066	2008 UA_{337}	—	October 20, 2008	Kitt Peak	Spacewatch	·	3.6 km	MPC · JPL
384067	2008 UG_{337}	—	October 20, 2008	Kitt Peak	Spacewatch	·	1.5 km	MPC · JPL
384068	2008 UC_{338}	—	October 20, 2008	Kitt Peak	Spacewatch	·	2.1 km	MPC · JPL
384069	2008 UQ_{340}	—	October 24, 2008	Catalina	CSS	KON	3.8 km	MPC · JPL
384070	2008 UG_{353}	—	October 20, 2008	Mount Lemmon	Mount Lemmon Survey	·	3.1 km	MPC · JPL
384071	2008 UN_{356}	—	October 23, 2008	Kitt Peak	Spacewatch	·	1.6 km	MPC · JPL
384072	2008 UG_{361}	—	September 24, 2008	Catalina	CSS	MAR	1.6 km	MPC · JPL
384073	2008 UZ_{367}	—	October 28, 2008	Socorro	LINEAR	·	1.6 km	MPC · JPL
384074	2008 VM_{14}	—	November 7, 2008	Andrushivka	Andrushivka	·	1.6 km	MPC · JPL
384075	2008 VX_{14}	—	November 9, 2008	Desert Moon	Stevens, B. L.	AGN	1.2 km	MPC · JPL
384076	2008 VH_{24}	—	November 1, 2008	Kitt Peak	Spacewatch	·	1.9 km	MPC · JPL
384077	2008 VK_{26}	—	October 25, 2008	Kitt Peak	Spacewatch	·	1.5 km	MPC · JPL
384078	2008 VM_{35}	—	November 2, 2008	Kitt Peak	Spacewatch	BRA	1.9 km	MPC · JPL
384079	2008 VA_{41}	—	November 3, 2008	Kitt Peak	Spacewatch	·	1.5 km	MPC · JPL
384080	2008 VC_{50}	—	October 8, 2008	Mount Lemmon	Mount Lemmon Survey	·	2.0 km	MPC · JPL
384081	2008 VD_{50}	—	November 4, 2008	Catalina	CSS	·	1.5 km	MPC · JPL
384082	2008 VF_{50}	—	November 4, 2008	Catalina	CSS	·	1.6 km	MPC · JPL
384083	2008 VJ_{53}	—	October 23, 2008	Kitt Peak	Spacewatch	·	2.6 km	MPC · JPL
384084	2008 VV_{54}	—	November 6, 2008	Mount Lemmon	Mount Lemmon Survey	·	2.6 km	MPC · JPL
384085	2008 VR_{60}	—	November 8, 2008	Mount Lemmon	Mount Lemmon Survey	HOF	2.6 km	MPC · JPL
384086	2008 VF_{63}	—	November 8, 2008	Kitt Peak	Spacewatch	JUN	1.1 km	MPC · JPL
384087	2008 VZ_{67}	—	November 7, 2008	Mount Lemmon	Mount Lemmon Survey	·	1.9 km	MPC · JPL
384088	2008 VV_{69}	—	November 4, 2008	Kitt Peak	Spacewatch	·	1.8 km	MPC · JPL
384089	2008 VZ_{74}	—	November 6, 2008	Catalina	CSS	·	2.3 km	MPC · JPL
384090	2008 VF_{76}	—	November 1, 2008	Mount Lemmon	Mount Lemmon Survey	·	2.0 km	MPC · JPL
384091	2008 VQ_{76}	—	November 1, 2008	Mount Lemmon	Mount Lemmon Survey	·	1.7 km	MPC · JPL
384092	2008 VW_{76}	—	November 2, 2008	Mount Lemmon	Mount Lemmon Survey	·	2.1 km	MPC · JPL
384093	2008 VD_{78}	—	November 7, 2008	Mount Lemmon	Mount Lemmon Survey	·	2.6 km	MPC · JPL
384094	2008 WE_{5}	—	November 17, 2008	Kitt Peak	Spacewatch	HOF	2.2 km	MPC · JPL
384095	2008 WR_{17}	—	November 17, 2008	Kitt Peak	Spacewatch	·	1.6 km	MPC · JPL
384096	2008 WL_{30}	—	November 19, 2008	Mount Lemmon	Mount Lemmon Survey	·	2.2 km	MPC · JPL
384097	2008 WC_{35}	—	October 1, 2008	Kitt Peak	Spacewatch	·	2.0 km	MPC · JPL
384098	2008 WU_{39}	—	November 17, 2008	Kitt Peak	Spacewatch	·	2.5 km	MPC · JPL
384099	2008 WV_{41}	—	November 17, 2008	Kitt Peak	Spacewatch	·	1.8 km	MPC · JPL
384100	2008 WD_{42}	—	November 17, 2008	Kitt Peak	Spacewatch	·	3.0 km	MPC · JPL

== 384101–384200 ==
back to top

Designation			Discovery			Properties		Ref
Permanent	Provisional	Named after	Date	Site	Discoverer(s)	Category	Diam.	Ref
384101	2008 WW_{45}	—	November 17, 2008	Kitt Peak	Spacewatch	KOR	1.2 km	MPC · JPL
384102	2008 WT_{47}	—	November 17, 2008	Kitt Peak	Spacewatch	·	3.7 km	MPC · JPL
384103	2008 WO_{49}	—	November 18, 2008	Catalina	CSS	·	2.6 km	MPC · JPL
384104	2008 WR_{70}	—	November 18, 2008	Kitt Peak	Spacewatch	·	2.1 km	MPC · JPL
384105	2008 WR_{82}	—	November 7, 2008	Mount Lemmon	Mount Lemmon Survey	·	2.4 km	MPC · JPL
384106	2008 WY_{82}	—	November 20, 2008	Kitt Peak	Spacewatch	MRX	1.2 km	MPC · JPL
384107	2008 WE_{90}	—	November 22, 2008	Kitt Peak	Spacewatch	·	2.7 km	MPC · JPL
384108	2008 WV_{91}	—	November 23, 2008	Mount Lemmon	Mount Lemmon Survey	·	2.4 km	MPC · JPL
384109	2008 WS_{93}	—	November 26, 2008	Črni Vrh	Skvarč, J.	·	2.4 km	MPC · JPL
384110	2008 WF_{94}	—	November 24, 2008	Sierra Stars	Dillon, W. G., Wells, D.	·	1.7 km	MPC · JPL
384111	2008 WJ_{95}	—	November 23, 2008	Socorro	LINEAR	·	2.2 km	MPC · JPL
384112	2008 WV_{97}	—	November 19, 2008	Catalina	CSS	·	2.3 km	MPC · JPL
384113	2008 WF_{127}	—	November 30, 2008	Mount Lemmon	Mount Lemmon Survey	·	1.7 km	MPC · JPL
384114	2008 WK_{129}	—	November 20, 2008	Mount Lemmon	Mount Lemmon Survey	·	1.4 km	MPC · JPL
384115	2008 WR_{133}	—	November 18, 2008	Catalina	CSS	·	3.3 km	MPC · JPL
384116	2008 WD_{134}	—	November 19, 2008	Mount Lemmon	Mount Lemmon Survey	·	2.8 km	MPC · JPL
384117	2008 WK_{137}	—	November 22, 2008	Kitt Peak	Spacewatch	·	3.2 km	MPC · JPL
384118	2008 WP_{139}	—	November 23, 2008	Mount Lemmon	Mount Lemmon Survey	·	3.8 km	MPC · JPL
384119	2008 WV_{140}	—	November 19, 2008	Catalina	CSS	DOR	2.9 km	MPC · JPL
384120	2008 WJ_{141}	—	November 22, 2008	Mount Lemmon	Mount Lemmon Survey	·	2.3 km	MPC · JPL
384121	2008 XP_{1}	—	December 2, 2008	Socorro	LINEAR	·	3.9 km	MPC · JPL
384122	2008 XL_{32}	—	December 2, 2008	Kitt Peak	Spacewatch	AGN	950 m	MPC · JPL
384123	2008 XC_{42}	—	November 24, 2008	Kitt Peak	Spacewatch	·	2.5 km	MPC · JPL
384124	2008 XH_{47}	—	December 1, 2008	Kitt Peak	Spacewatch	·	1.5 km	MPC · JPL
384125	2008 XF_{49}	—	December 7, 2008	Mount Lemmon	Mount Lemmon Survey	·	4.6 km	MPC · JPL
384126	2008 YN_{11}	—	December 21, 2008	Kitt Peak	Spacewatch	·	2.1 km	MPC · JPL
384127	2008 YG_{49}	—	December 29, 2008	Mount Lemmon	Mount Lemmon Survey	HYG	3.1 km	MPC · JPL
384128	2008 YR_{58}	—	December 30, 2008	Kitt Peak	Spacewatch	·	1.9 km	MPC · JPL
384129	2008 YZ_{65}	—	December 31, 2008	Kitt Peak	Spacewatch	·	3.1 km	MPC · JPL
384130	2008 YW_{69}	—	December 29, 2008	Mount Lemmon	Mount Lemmon Survey	·	3.0 km	MPC · JPL
384131	2008 YJ_{75}	—	December 30, 2008	Mount Lemmon	Mount Lemmon Survey	·	3.8 km	MPC · JPL
384132	2008 YZ_{83}	—	December 31, 2008	Kitt Peak	Spacewatch	615	1.7 km	MPC · JPL
384133	2008 YA_{86}	—	December 29, 2008	Kitt Peak	Spacewatch	·	2.2 km	MPC · JPL
384134	2008 YS_{87}	—	December 29, 2008	Kitt Peak	Spacewatch	·	3.0 km	MPC · JPL
384135	2008 YC_{91}	—	December 29, 2008	Kitt Peak	Spacewatch	·	2.8 km	MPC · JPL
384136	2008 YR_{97}	—	December 29, 2008	Mount Lemmon	Mount Lemmon Survey	·	3.0 km	MPC · JPL
384137	2008 YU_{99}	—	December 29, 2008	Kitt Peak	Spacewatch	·	2.5 km	MPC · JPL
384138	2008 YY_{103}	—	December 29, 2008	Kitt Peak	Spacewatch	·	1.7 km	MPC · JPL
384139	2008 YM_{106}	—	December 29, 2008	Kitt Peak	Spacewatch	·	1.8 km	MPC · JPL
384140	2008 YU_{117}	—	December 29, 2008	Mount Lemmon	Mount Lemmon Survey	THM	2.3 km	MPC · JPL
384141	2008 YA_{118}	—	December 29, 2008	Mount Lemmon	Mount Lemmon Survey	·	2.3 km	MPC · JPL
384142	2008 YQ_{129}	—	May 16, 2005	Mount Lemmon	Mount Lemmon Survey	·	2.6 km	MPC · JPL
384143	2008 YV_{134}	—	December 30, 2008	Kitt Peak	Spacewatch	KOR	1.5 km	MPC · JPL
384144	2008 YJ_{137}	—	December 30, 2008	Kitt Peak	Spacewatch	EOS	2.5 km	MPC · JPL
384145	2008 YR_{138}	—	December 30, 2008	Mount Lemmon	Mount Lemmon Survey	URS	3.5 km	MPC · JPL
384146	2008 YX_{151}	—	December 22, 2008	Mount Lemmon	Mount Lemmon Survey	EOS	1.9 km	MPC · JPL
384147	2008 YG_{152}	—	December 22, 2008	Kitt Peak	Spacewatch	KOR	1.4 km	MPC · JPL
384148	2008 YD_{154}	—	December 21, 2008	Kitt Peak	Spacewatch	·	3.0 km	MPC · JPL
384149	2008 YK_{165}	—	December 30, 2008	Catalina	CSS	·	3.6 km	MPC · JPL
384150	2008 YF_{171}	—	December 22, 2008	Catalina	CSS	·	5.6 km	MPC · JPL
384151	2009 AO_{13}	—	January 2, 2009	Mount Lemmon	Mount Lemmon Survey	EOS	2.4 km	MPC · JPL
384152	2009 AQ_{13}	—	December 22, 2008	Mount Lemmon	Mount Lemmon Survey	·	3.3 km	MPC · JPL
384153	2009 AV_{14}	—	January 2, 2009	Mount Lemmon	Mount Lemmon Survey	·	2.4 km	MPC · JPL
384154	2009 AH_{20}	—	January 2, 2009	Mount Lemmon	Mount Lemmon Survey	VER	4.2 km	MPC · JPL
384155	2009 AJ_{24}	—	May 24, 2006	Mount Lemmon	Mount Lemmon Survey	·	2.3 km	MPC · JPL
384156	2009 AF_{25}	—	January 1, 2009	Mount Lemmon	Mount Lemmon Survey	·	1.8 km	MPC · JPL
384157	2009 AV_{26}	—	January 2, 2009	Kitt Peak	Spacewatch	KOR	1.4 km	MPC · JPL
384158	2009 AK_{27}	—	January 2, 2009	Kitt Peak	Spacewatch	·	1.7 km	MPC · JPL
384159	2009 AS_{32}	—	January 15, 2009	Kitt Peak	Spacewatch	·	4.4 km	MPC · JPL
384160	2009 AS_{33}	—	January 15, 2009	Kitt Peak	Spacewatch	·	3.0 km	MPC · JPL
384161	2009 AO_{35}	—	January 15, 2009	Kitt Peak	Spacewatch	·	3.6 km	MPC · JPL
384162	2009 AP_{43}	—	January 1, 2009	Kitt Peak	Spacewatch	·	4.3 km	MPC · JPL
384163	2009 AH_{47}	—	January 2, 2009	Mount Lemmon	Mount Lemmon Survey	·	2.7 km	MPC · JPL
384164	2009 AH_{49}	—	January 1, 2009	Kitt Peak	Spacewatch	·	3.5 km	MPC · JPL
384165	2009 BB_{10}	—	January 21, 2009	Sandlot	G. Hug	·	2.0 km	MPC · JPL
384166	2009 BR_{20}	—	January 2, 2009	Mount Lemmon	Mount Lemmon Survey	·	2.1 km	MPC · JPL
384167	2009 BO_{25}	—	January 19, 2009	Mount Lemmon	Mount Lemmon Survey	·	3.4 km	MPC · JPL
384168	2009 BR_{29}	—	January 16, 2009	Kitt Peak	Spacewatch	·	2.6 km	MPC · JPL
384169	2009 BW_{30}	—	January 16, 2009	Kitt Peak	Spacewatch	KOR	1.6 km	MPC · JPL
384170	2009 BK_{31}	—	January 16, 2009	Kitt Peak	Spacewatch	EOS	2.2 km	MPC · JPL
384171	2009 BC_{35}	—	January 16, 2009	Kitt Peak	Spacewatch	·	2.5 km	MPC · JPL
384172	2009 BH_{35}	—	January 1, 2009	Mount Lemmon	Mount Lemmon Survey	·	3.0 km	MPC · JPL
384173	2009 BL_{41}	—	January 16, 2009	Kitt Peak	Spacewatch	·	2.4 km	MPC · JPL
384174	2009 BK_{44}	—	January 16, 2009	Kitt Peak	Spacewatch	·	2.9 km	MPC · JPL
384175	2009 BN_{44}	—	January 16, 2009	Kitt Peak	Spacewatch	·	4.4 km	MPC · JPL
384176	2009 BM_{49}	—	January 16, 2009	Mount Lemmon	Mount Lemmon Survey	·	2.3 km	MPC · JPL
384177	2009 BQ_{51}	—	January 16, 2009	Mount Lemmon	Mount Lemmon Survey	·	1.5 km	MPC · JPL
384178	2009 BK_{52}	—	January 16, 2009	Kitt Peak	Spacewatch	·	4.1 km	MPC · JPL
384179	2009 BK_{56}	—	January 17, 2009	Kitt Peak	Spacewatch	·	3.3 km	MPC · JPL
384180	2009 BS_{67}	—	January 20, 2009	Kitt Peak	Spacewatch	·	3.4 km	MPC · JPL
384181	2009 BH_{70}	—	January 25, 2009	Catalina	CSS	EOS	2.6 km	MPC · JPL
384182	2009 BK_{75}	—	January 23, 2009	Purple Mountain	PMO NEO Survey Program	·	2.9 km	MPC · JPL
384183	2009 BC_{76}	—	January 18, 2009	Mount Lemmon	Mount Lemmon Survey	THB	3.2 km	MPC · JPL
384184	2009 BN_{83}	—	January 20, 2009	Catalina	CSS	TIR	3.3 km	MPC · JPL
384185	2009 BX_{85}	—	January 25, 2009	Kitt Peak	Spacewatch	·	2.8 km	MPC · JPL
384186	2009 BT_{90}	—	January 25, 2009	Kitt Peak	Spacewatch	·	3.4 km	MPC · JPL
384187	2009 BR_{94}	—	January 25, 2009	Kitt Peak	Spacewatch	·	1.7 km	MPC · JPL
384188	2009 BS_{101}	—	January 29, 2009	Mount Lemmon	Mount Lemmon Survey	·	2.3 km	MPC · JPL
384189	2009 BJ_{103}	—	December 29, 2008	Mount Lemmon	Mount Lemmon Survey	EOS	2.2 km	MPC · JPL
384190	2009 BT_{106}	—	January 28, 2009	Catalina	CSS	·	2.7 km	MPC · JPL
384191	2009 BG_{107}	—	January 28, 2009	Catalina	CSS	H	630 m	MPC · JPL
384192	2009 BH_{113}	—	January 26, 2009	Cerro Burek	Burek, Cerro	EOS	2.0 km	MPC · JPL
384193	2009 BH_{117}	—	January 29, 2009	Mount Lemmon	Mount Lemmon Survey	·	3.8 km	MPC · JPL
384194	2009 BO_{118}	—	January 30, 2009	Mount Lemmon	Mount Lemmon Survey	EOS	3.8 km	MPC · JPL
384195	2009 BA_{131}	—	January 31, 2009	Mount Lemmon	Mount Lemmon Survey	HYG	2.4 km	MPC · JPL
384196	2009 BZ_{132}	—	January 31, 2009	Siding Spring	SSS	·	4.2 km	MPC · JPL
384197	2009 BP_{137}	—	January 29, 2009	Kitt Peak	Spacewatch	EOS	1.8 km	MPC · JPL
384198	2009 BP_{146}	—	January 30, 2009	Mount Lemmon	Mount Lemmon Survey	·	2.2 km	MPC · JPL
384199	2009 BK_{150}	—	January 31, 2009	Kitt Peak	Spacewatch	·	2.5 km	MPC · JPL
384200	2009 BZ_{153}	—	January 31, 2009	Kitt Peak	Spacewatch	·	2.6 km	MPC · JPL

== 384201–384300 ==
back to top

Designation			Discovery			Properties		Ref
Permanent	Provisional	Named after	Date	Site	Discoverer(s)	Category	Diam.	Ref
384201	2009 BW_{155}	—	January 31, 2009	Kitt Peak	Spacewatch	·	1.8 km	MPC · JPL
384202	2009 BK_{156}	—	January 31, 2009	Kitt Peak	Spacewatch	·	3.1 km	MPC · JPL
384203	2009 BN_{168}	—	January 18, 2009	Kitt Peak	Spacewatch	·	3.3 km	MPC · JPL
384204	2009 BS_{172}	—	January 18, 2009	Mount Lemmon	Mount Lemmon Survey	·	3.7 km	MPC · JPL
384205	2009 BE_{183}	—	January 25, 2009	Kitt Peak	Spacewatch	·	2.0 km	MPC · JPL
384206	2009 BB_{186}	—	January 29, 2009	Catalina	CSS	·	5.2 km	MPC · JPL
384207	2009 BT_{186}	—	January 25, 2009	Kitt Peak	Spacewatch	THM	2.0 km	MPC · JPL
384208	2009 BU_{186}	—	January 25, 2009	Kitt Peak	Spacewatch	·	2.3 km	MPC · JPL
384209	2009 BQ_{188}	—	January 18, 2009	Mount Lemmon	Mount Lemmon Survey	·	5.1 km	MPC · JPL
384210	2009 CS_{6}	—	January 19, 2009	Mount Lemmon	Mount Lemmon Survey	EOS	2.1 km	MPC · JPL
384211	2009 CF_{29}	—	February 1, 2009	Kitt Peak	Spacewatch	·	2.3 km	MPC · JPL
384212	2009 CB_{30}	—	February 1, 2009	Kitt Peak	Spacewatch	·	3.1 km	MPC · JPL
384213	2009 CY_{31}	—	February 1, 2009	Kitt Peak	Spacewatch	·	1.7 km	MPC · JPL
384214	2009 CJ_{32}	—	February 1, 2009	Kitt Peak	Spacewatch	THM	2.3 km	MPC · JPL
384215	2009 CX_{38}	—	February 13, 2009	Kitt Peak	Spacewatch	EOS	2.3 km	MPC · JPL
384216	2009 CT_{49}	—	February 14, 2009	Mount Lemmon	Mount Lemmon Survey	·	3.8 km	MPC · JPL
384217	2009 CN_{59}	—	February 4, 2009	Mount Lemmon	Mount Lemmon Survey	·	2.9 km	MPC · JPL
384218	2009 CX_{60}	—	February 14, 2009	Kitt Peak	Spacewatch	·	3.8 km	MPC · JPL
384219	2009 CM_{63}	—	November 11, 2002	Kitt Peak	Spacewatch	·	4.5 km	MPC · JPL
384220	2009 DK_{4}	—	February 21, 2009	Catalina	CSS	H	690 m	MPC · JPL
384221	2009 DN_{9}	—	February 17, 2009	Socorro	LINEAR	·	3.6 km	MPC · JPL
384222	2009 DP_{9}	—	February 1, 2009	Mount Lemmon	Mount Lemmon Survey	·	2.8 km	MPC · JPL
384223	2009 DG_{17}	—	February 17, 2009	Kitt Peak	Spacewatch	·	5.1 km	MPC · JPL
384224	2009 DV_{22}	—	February 19, 2009	Kitt Peak	Spacewatch	EOS	1.7 km	MPC · JPL
384225	2009 DP_{26}	—	February 22, 2009	Calar Alto	F. Hormuth	·	1.4 km	MPC · JPL
384226	2009 DA_{31}	—	February 23, 2009	Cordell-Lorenz	D. T. Durig	·	2.0 km	MPC · JPL
384227	2009 DZ_{32}	—	February 20, 2009	Kitt Peak	Spacewatch	TIR	3.0 km	MPC · JPL
384228	2009 DN_{35}	—	February 20, 2009	Kitt Peak	Spacewatch	·	2.0 km	MPC · JPL
384229	2009 DQ_{40}	—	January 17, 2009	Kitt Peak	Spacewatch	·	2.3 km	MPC · JPL
384230	2009 DT_{47}	—	February 28, 2009	Socorro	LINEAR	·	2.7 km	MPC · JPL
384231	2009 DP_{53}	—	September 16, 2006	Anderson Mesa	LONEOS	VER	3.3 km	MPC · JPL
384232	2009 DR_{54}	—	January 17, 2009	Kitt Peak	Spacewatch	·	2.9 km	MPC · JPL
384233	2009 DU_{55}	—	February 22, 2009	Kitt Peak	Spacewatch	·	2.9 km	MPC · JPL
384234	2009 DZ_{55}	—	February 22, 2009	Kitt Peak	Spacewatch	·	1.9 km	MPC · JPL
384235	2009 DO_{57}	—	December 30, 2008	Mount Lemmon	Mount Lemmon Survey	·	3.4 km	MPC · JPL
384236	2009 DC_{58}	—	November 19, 2007	Kitt Peak	Spacewatch	·	2.8 km	MPC · JPL
384237	2009 DU_{63}	—	February 22, 2009	Kitt Peak	Spacewatch	·	3.5 km	MPC · JPL
384238	2009 DY_{66}	—	February 24, 2009	Mount Lemmon	Mount Lemmon Survey	·	1.9 km	MPC · JPL
384239	2009 DM_{71}	—	February 19, 2009	La Sagra	OAM	HYG	2.8 km	MPC · JPL
384240	2009 DH_{74}	—	February 26, 2009	Catalina	CSS	·	2.3 km	MPC · JPL
384241	2009 DG_{76}	—	February 21, 2009	Mount Lemmon	Mount Lemmon Survey	·	2.0 km	MPC · JPL
384242	2009 DN_{77}	—	February 22, 2009	Mount Lemmon	Mount Lemmon Survey	EOS	2.6 km	MPC · JPL
384243	2009 DA_{94}	—	February 28, 2009	Mount Lemmon	Mount Lemmon Survey	·	2.7 km	MPC · JPL
384244	2009 DP_{107}	—	February 28, 2009	Kitt Peak	Spacewatch	·	2.6 km	MPC · JPL
384245	2009 DF_{116}	—	February 27, 2009	Kitt Peak	Spacewatch	·	3.5 km	MPC · JPL
384246	2009 DJ_{123}	—	February 24, 2009	Mount Lemmon	Mount Lemmon Survey	·	3.3 km	MPC · JPL
384247	2009 DW_{123}	—	February 16, 2009	Kitt Peak	Spacewatch	H	600 m	MPC · JPL
384248	2009 DG_{135}	—	February 22, 2009	Kitt Peak	Spacewatch	·	2.3 km	MPC · JPL
384249	2009 DH_{137}	—	February 19, 2009	Mount Lemmon	Mount Lemmon Survey	·	2.1 km	MPC · JPL
384250	2009 DZ_{138}	—	February 24, 2009	Kitt Peak	Spacewatch	(159)	2.4 km	MPC · JPL
384251	2009 DT_{141}	—	January 18, 2009	Mount Lemmon	Mount Lemmon Survey	·	2.0 km	MPC · JPL
384252	2009 ES_{3}	—	March 14, 2009	La Sagra	OAM	·	3.4 km	MPC · JPL
384253	2009 EU_{14}	—	March 15, 2009	Kitt Peak	Spacewatch	·	2.8 km	MPC · JPL
384254	2009 EY_{14}	—	March 15, 2009	Kitt Peak	Spacewatch	THM	2.2 km	MPC · JPL
384255	2009 EL_{16}	—	March 15, 2009	Kitt Peak	Spacewatch	·	2.2 km	MPC · JPL
384256	2009 EJ_{18}	—	March 15, 2009	Kitt Peak	Spacewatch	·	3.2 km	MPC · JPL
384257	2009 EX_{18}	—	March 15, 2009	Mount Lemmon	Mount Lemmon Survey	·	2.4 km	MPC · JPL
384258	2009 EG_{20}	—	March 15, 2009	La Sagra	OAM	EUP	3.7 km	MPC · JPL
384259	2009 EB_{28}	—	March 1, 2009	Mount Lemmon	Mount Lemmon Survey	·	5.6 km	MPC · JPL
384260	2009 EY_{28}	—	March 6, 2009	Siding Spring	SSS	·	4.4 km	MPC · JPL
384261	2009 FF_{3}	—	March 16, 2009	La Sagra	OAM	TIR	2.7 km	MPC · JPL
384262	2009 FP_{25}	—	March 22, 2009	Taunus	R. Kling, Zimmer, U.	·	3.4 km	MPC · JPL
384263	2009 FD_{26}	—	March 16, 2009	Catalina	CSS	·	3.7 km	MPC · JPL
384264	2009 FW_{32}	—	March 17, 2009	Catalina	CSS	·	4.4 km	MPC · JPL
384265	2009 FJ_{33}	—	March 21, 2009	Catalina	CSS	·	5.2 km	MPC · JPL
384266	2009 FO_{43}	—	March 30, 2009	Sierra Stars	Tozzi, F.	·	4.1 km	MPC · JPL
384267	2009 FA_{51}	—	March 28, 2009	Catalina	CSS	H	720 m	MPC · JPL
384268	2009 FM_{52}	—	March 28, 2009	Catalina	CSS	EUP	5.5 km	MPC · JPL
384269	2009 FU_{74}	—	March 18, 2009	Socorro	LINEAR	H	670 m	MPC · JPL
384270	2009 HQ_{5}	—	April 17, 2009	Kitt Peak	Spacewatch	EOS	2.1 km	MPC · JPL
384271	2009 HU_{74}	—	September 10, 2007	Catalina	CSS	H	600 m	MPC · JPL
384272	2009 HR_{94}	—	December 16, 2004	Catalina	CSS	·	1.9 km	MPC · JPL
384273	2009 KK_{9}	—	May 24, 2009	Catalina	CSS	·	740 m	MPC · JPL
384274	2009 PD_{2}	—	August 15, 2009	Calvin-Rehoboth	L. A. Molnar	·	870 m	MPC · JPL
384275	2009 PO_{3}	—	August 12, 2009	La Sagra	OAM	·	560 m	MPC · JPL
384276	2009 PV_{11}	—	August 15, 2009	Kitt Peak	Spacewatch	·	1.0 km	MPC · JPL
384277	2009 QR_{5}	—	August 17, 2009	Altschwendt	W. Ries	·	690 m	MPC · JPL
384278	2009 QM_{8}	—	August 17, 2009	Socorro	LINEAR	·	960 m	MPC · JPL
384279	2009 QR_{10}	—	August 15, 2009	Catalina	CSS	·	930 m	MPC · JPL
384280	2009 QL_{18}	—	August 17, 2009	Kitt Peak	Spacewatch	·	910 m	MPC · JPL
384281	2009 QC_{20}	—	August 19, 2009	La Sagra	OAM	NYS	1 km	MPC · JPL
384282 Evgeniyegorov	2009 QU_{38}	Evgeniyegorov	August 28, 2009	Zelenchukskaya Stn105285	T. V. Krjačko	·	1.4 km	MPC · JPL
384283	2009 QC_{39}	—	August 20, 2009	Kitt Peak	Spacewatch	·	1.0 km	MPC · JPL
384284	2009 QE_{43}	—	August 26, 2009	Catalina	CSS	·	750 m	MPC · JPL
384285	2009 QV_{47}	—	February 28, 2008	Mount Lemmon	Mount Lemmon Survey	·	850 m	MPC · JPL
384286	2009 QJ_{51}	—	August 27, 2009	Kitt Peak	Spacewatch	MAS	650 m	MPC · JPL
384287	2009 RA_{7}	—	September 10, 2009	Catalina	CSS	·	980 m	MPC · JPL
384288	2009 RA_{14}	—	September 12, 2009	Kitt Peak	Spacewatch	·	1.2 km	MPC · JPL
384289	2009 RJ_{14}	—	September 12, 2009	Kitt Peak	Spacewatch	·	790 m	MPC · JPL
384290	2009 RL_{14}	—	September 12, 2009	Kitt Peak	Spacewatch	·	1.4 km	MPC · JPL
384291	2009 RM_{15}	—	September 12, 2009	Kitt Peak	Spacewatch	·	770 m	MPC · JPL
384292	2009 RU_{15}	—	September 12, 2009	Kitt Peak	Spacewatch	·	1.2 km	MPC · JPL
384293	2009 RM_{25}	—	September 15, 2009	Kitt Peak	Spacewatch	V	800 m	MPC · JPL
384294	2009 RH_{26}	—	September 13, 2009	Socorro	LINEAR	·	800 m	MPC · JPL
384295	2009 RH_{27}	—	September 12, 2009	Kitt Peak	Spacewatch	·	1.4 km	MPC · JPL
384296	2009 RM_{42}	—	September 15, 2009	Kitt Peak	Spacewatch	·	790 m	MPC · JPL
384297	2009 RS_{44}	—	September 15, 2009	Kitt Peak	Spacewatch	·	1.2 km	MPC · JPL
384298	2009 RJ_{55}	—	September 15, 2009	Kitt Peak	Spacewatch	V	580 m	MPC · JPL
384299	2009 RO_{58}	—	September 15, 2009	Kitt Peak	Spacewatch	·	1.2 km	MPC · JPL
384300	2009 SB_{3}	—	September 16, 2009	Kitt Peak	Spacewatch	·	1.4 km	MPC · JPL

== 384301–384400 ==
back to top

Designation			Discovery			Properties		Ref
Permanent	Provisional	Named after	Date	Site	Discoverer(s)	Category	Diam.	Ref
384301	2009 SS_{19}	—	September 20, 2009	Calvin-Rehoboth	Calvin College	·	890 m	MPC · JPL
384302	2009 SV_{22}	—	November 24, 2006	Kitt Peak	Spacewatch	·	740 m	MPC · JPL
384303	2009 SM_{37}	—	September 16, 2009	Kitt Peak	Spacewatch	NYS	1.1 km	MPC · JPL
384304	2009 SA_{39}	—	September 16, 2009	Kitt Peak	Spacewatch	·	900 m	MPC · JPL
384305	2009 SU_{60}	—	September 17, 2009	Kitt Peak	Spacewatch	·	800 m	MPC · JPL
384306	2009 SJ_{67}	—	September 17, 2009	Kitt Peak	Spacewatch	·	890 m	MPC · JPL
384307	2009 SJ_{88}	—	September 18, 2009	Kitt Peak	Spacewatch	NYS	1.5 km	MPC · JPL
384308	2009 SG_{108}	—	September 16, 2009	Mount Lemmon	Mount Lemmon Survey	·	950 m	MPC · JPL
384309	2009 SD_{118}	—	September 18, 2009	Kitt Peak	Spacewatch	·	830 m	MPC · JPL
384310	2009 SH_{118}	—	September 18, 2009	Kitt Peak	Spacewatch	·	870 m	MPC · JPL
384311	2009 SB_{121}	—	September 18, 2009	Kitt Peak	Spacewatch	·	750 m	MPC · JPL
384312	2009 SS_{130}	—	September 18, 2009	Kitt Peak	Spacewatch	·	1.0 km	MPC · JPL
384313	2009 SW_{143}	—	September 19, 2009	Kitt Peak	Spacewatch	·	860 m	MPC · JPL
384314	2009 SV_{152}	—	September 20, 2009	Mount Lemmon	Mount Lemmon Survey	ERI	1.2 km	MPC · JPL
384315	2009 SP_{158}	—	September 20, 2009	Kitt Peak	Spacewatch	·	1.4 km	MPC · JPL
384316	2009 SO_{167}	—	September 23, 2009	Mount Lemmon	Mount Lemmon Survey	MAS	750 m	MPC · JPL
384317	2009 SJ_{202}	—	September 22, 2009	Kitt Peak	Spacewatch	·	930 m	MPC · JPL
384318	2009 SG_{209}	—	September 23, 2009	Kitt Peak	Spacewatch	MAS	790 m	MPC · JPL
384319	2009 SH_{214}	—	September 23, 2009	Kitt Peak	Spacewatch	·	1.1 km	MPC · JPL
384320	2009 SW_{214}	—	September 23, 2009	Kitt Peak	Spacewatch	·	730 m	MPC · JPL
384321	2009 ST_{223}	—	November 27, 2006	Kitt Peak	Spacewatch	·	560 m	MPC · JPL
384322	2009 SY_{224}	—	September 25, 2009	Kitt Peak	Spacewatch	·	790 m	MPC · JPL
384323	2009 SZ_{239}	—	September 17, 2009	Catalina	CSS	·	870 m	MPC · JPL
384324	2009 SL_{251}	—	January 10, 2003	Kitt Peak	Spacewatch	NYS	860 m	MPC · JPL
384325	2009 SP_{268}	—	September 24, 2009	Kitt Peak	Spacewatch	·	1.4 km	MPC · JPL
384326	2009 SM_{271}	—	September 24, 2009	Kitt Peak	Spacewatch	·	1 km	MPC · JPL
384327	2009 SM_{289}	—	September 25, 2009	Kitt Peak	Spacewatch	·	1.7 km	MPC · JPL
384328	2009 SJ_{302}	—	September 16, 2009	Catalina	CSS	(2076)	1.0 km	MPC · JPL
384329	2009 SQ_{304}	—	August 27, 2009	Kitt Peak	Spacewatch	·	860 m	MPC · JPL
384330	2009 SD_{330}	—	November 11, 1998	Caussols	ODAS	·	1.7 km	MPC · JPL
384331	2009 SA_{332}	—	September 20, 2009	Mount Lemmon	Mount Lemmon Survey	·	850 m	MPC · JPL
384332	2009 SK_{337}	—	September 27, 2009	Catalina	CSS	·	1.2 km	MPC · JPL
384333	2009 SJ_{343}	—	September 17, 2009	Kitt Peak	Spacewatch	·	1.2 km	MPC · JPL
384334	2009 SC_{347}	—	September 27, 2009	Catalina	CSS	·	1.7 km	MPC · JPL
384335	2009 SP_{350}	—	September 26, 2009	Kitt Peak	Spacewatch	·	700 m	MPC · JPL
384336	2009 SY_{362}	—	September 25, 2009	Kitt Peak	Spacewatch	·	730 m	MPC · JPL
384337	2009 TF_{1}	—	October 10, 2009	Bisei SG Center	BATTeRS	·	960 m	MPC · JPL
384338	2009 TR_{2}	—	October 11, 2009	La Sagra	OAM	NYS	1.2 km	MPC · JPL
384339	2009 TM_{3}	—	October 11, 2009	La Sagra	OAM	·	1.5 km	MPC · JPL
384340	2009 TE_{4}	—	October 13, 2009	Mayhill	Lowe, A.	·	1.5 km	MPC · JPL
384341	2009 TC_{9}	—	October 12, 2009	La Sagra	OAM	·	1.5 km	MPC · JPL
384342	2009 TW_{10}	—	October 11, 2009	Mount Lemmon	Mount Lemmon Survey	NYS	1.2 km	MPC · JPL
384343	2009 TO_{12}	—	October 10, 2009	Dauban	Kugel, F.	ERI	1.7 km	MPC · JPL
384344	2009 TP_{14}	—	October 12, 2009	Mount Lemmon	Mount Lemmon Survey	·	1.1 km	MPC · JPL
384345	2009 TU_{26}	—	September 28, 2009	Mount Lemmon	Mount Lemmon Survey	·	1.2 km	MPC · JPL
384346	2009 TO_{27}	—	October 14, 2009	La Sagra	OAM	·	1.2 km	MPC · JPL
384347	2009 TO_{30}	—	October 15, 2009	Mount Lemmon	Mount Lemmon Survey	·	1.2 km	MPC · JPL
384348	2009 TZ_{35}	—	October 14, 2009	Catalina	CSS	·	1.3 km	MPC · JPL
384349	2009 TT_{44}	—	October 14, 2009	Mount Lemmon	Mount Lemmon Survey	NYS	1.3 km	MPC · JPL
384350	2009 UQ_{1}	—	October 16, 2009	Socorro	LINEAR	·	1.1 km	MPC · JPL
384351	2009 UC_{2}	—	October 1, 2009	Mount Lemmon	Mount Lemmon Survey	·	1.7 km	MPC · JPL
384352	2009 UX_{16}	—	October 18, 2009	La Sagra	OAM	NYS	990 m	MPC · JPL
384353	2009 UV_{17}	—	October 20, 2009	Mayhill	Mayhill	·	1.3 km	MPC · JPL
384354	2009 UA_{28}	—	October 22, 2009	Catalina	CSS	NYS	1.1 km	MPC · JPL
384355	2009 UW_{33}	—	October 18, 2009	Mount Lemmon	Mount Lemmon Survey	NYS	1.0 km	MPC · JPL
384356	2009 UA_{71}	—	October 22, 2009	Catalina	CSS	·	1.5 km	MPC · JPL
384357	2009 UA_{72}	—	October 23, 2009	Kitt Peak	Spacewatch	·	1.0 km	MPC · JPL
384358	2009 UL_{72}	—	October 23, 2009	Mount Lemmon	Mount Lemmon Survey	·	1.4 km	MPC · JPL
384359	2009 UM_{74}	—	October 21, 2009	Mount Lemmon	Mount Lemmon Survey	·	1.0 km	MPC · JPL
384360	2009 UV_{80}	—	October 22, 2009	Catalina	CSS	NYS	1.1 km	MPC · JPL
384361	2009 UP_{81}	—	February 21, 2007	Mount Lemmon	Mount Lemmon Survey	NYS	820 m	MPC · JPL
384362	2009 UV_{83}	—	September 19, 2009	Mount Lemmon	Mount Lemmon Survey	·	1.0 km	MPC · JPL
384363	2009 US_{85}	—	October 23, 2009	Mount Lemmon	Mount Lemmon Survey	MAS	780 m	MPC · JPL
384364	2009 UT_{93}	—	October 26, 2009	Bisei SG Center	BATTeRS	·	1.7 km	MPC · JPL
384365	2009 UR_{102}	—	October 24, 2009	Catalina	CSS	·	1.5 km	MPC · JPL
384366	2009 UF_{108}	—	October 23, 2009	Kitt Peak	Spacewatch	·	870 m	MPC · JPL
384367	2009 UB_{110}	—	October 23, 2009	Kitt Peak	Spacewatch	·	1.0 km	MPC · JPL
384368	2009 UX_{116}	—	October 22, 2009	Mount Lemmon	Mount Lemmon Survey	·	1.3 km	MPC · JPL
384369	2009 UF_{125}	—	December 23, 2006	Mount Lemmon	Mount Lemmon Survey	·	1.2 km	MPC · JPL
384370	2009 UC_{131}	—	October 16, 2009	Catalina	CSS	·	1.3 km	MPC · JPL
384371	2009 UM_{136}	—	October 24, 2009	Catalina	CSS	·	930 m	MPC · JPL
384372	2009 UW_{138}	—	October 25, 2009	Mount Lemmon	Mount Lemmon Survey	·	1.4 km	MPC · JPL
384373	2009 UL_{150}	—	October 18, 2009	Mount Lemmon	Mount Lemmon Survey	·	1.0 km	MPC · JPL
384374	2009 UE_{152}	—	October 23, 2009	Mount Lemmon	Mount Lemmon Survey	·	1 km	MPC · JPL
384375	2009 VC_{3}	—	November 10, 2009	Mayhill	Mayhill	·	1.2 km	MPC · JPL
384376	2009 VG_{3}	—	November 9, 2009	Kachina	Hobart, J.	·	1.7 km	MPC · JPL
384377	2009 VR_{5}	—	November 8, 2009	Mount Lemmon	Mount Lemmon Survey	·	1.2 km	MPC · JPL
384378	2009 VS_{24}	—	November 9, 2009	La Sagra	OAM	·	1.3 km	MPC · JPL
384379	2009 VX_{26}	—	November 8, 2009	Kitt Peak	Spacewatch	·	1.3 km	MPC · JPL
384380	2009 VZ_{26}	—	November 8, 2009	Kitt Peak	Spacewatch	·	1.2 km	MPC · JPL
384381	2009 VQ_{28}	—	November 8, 2009	Mount Lemmon	Mount Lemmon Survey	V	760 m	MPC · JPL
384382	2009 VF_{38}	—	November 8, 2009	Mount Lemmon	Mount Lemmon Survey	MAS	660 m	MPC · JPL
384383	2009 VD_{45}	—	November 11, 2009	Socorro	LINEAR	·	1.1 km	MPC · JPL
384384	2009 VJ_{46}	—	November 9, 2009	Catalina	CSS	·	1.2 km	MPC · JPL
384385	2009 VK_{64}	—	May 9, 1996	Kitt Peak	Spacewatch	·	1.8 km	MPC · JPL
384386	2009 VG_{69}	—	November 9, 2009	Mount Lemmon	Mount Lemmon Survey	·	2.8 km	MPC · JPL
384387	2009 VY_{70}	—	November 9, 2009	Kitt Peak	Spacewatch	·	2.3 km	MPC · JPL
384388	2009 VE_{73}	—	October 9, 1999	Kitt Peak	Spacewatch	·	900 m	MPC · JPL
384389	2009 VO_{76}	—	November 15, 2009	Mount Lemmon	Mount Lemmon Survey	HNS	1.5 km	MPC · JPL
384390	2009 VL_{77}	—	November 9, 2009	Catalina	CSS	·	1.9 km	MPC · JPL
384391	2009 VT_{78}	—	November 10, 2009	Kitt Peak	Spacewatch	NYS	1.1 km	MPC · JPL
384392	2009 VC_{80}	—	November 11, 2009	Catalina	CSS	·	1.4 km	MPC · JPL
384393	2009 VU_{93}	—	November 15, 2009	Catalina	CSS	·	1.3 km	MPC · JPL
384394	2009 VR_{111}	—	November 14, 2009	La Sagra	OAM	·	1.5 km	MPC · JPL
384395	2009 VF_{114}	—	November 9, 2009	Mount Lemmon	Mount Lemmon Survey	·	1.3 km	MPC · JPL
384396	2009 WO_{1}	—	August 28, 2005	Kitt Peak	Spacewatch	NYS	1.0 km	MPC · JPL
384397	2009 WB_{27}	—	October 11, 2005	Kitt Peak	Spacewatch	NYS	1.3 km	MPC · JPL
384398	2009 WG_{27}	—	November 16, 2009	Kitt Peak	Spacewatch	·	960 m	MPC · JPL
384399	2009 WW_{36}	—	November 8, 2009	Kitt Peak	Spacewatch	·	1.4 km	MPC · JPL
384400	2009 WG_{43}	—	November 17, 2009	Catalina	CSS	·	1.3 km	MPC · JPL

== 384401–384500 ==
back to top

Designation			Discovery			Properties		Ref
Permanent	Provisional	Named after	Date	Site	Discoverer(s)	Category	Diam.	Ref
384401	2009 WK_{43}	—	November 17, 2009	Catalina	CSS	·	1.3 km	MPC · JPL
384402	2009 WA_{45}	—	November 18, 2009	Kitt Peak	Spacewatch	·	960 m	MPC · JPL
384403	2009 WU_{65}	—	October 30, 2005	Mount Lemmon	Mount Lemmon Survey	NYS	990 m	MPC · JPL
384404	2009 WT_{70}	—	March 11, 2007	Kitt Peak	Spacewatch	NYS	1.3 km	MPC · JPL
384405	2009 WU_{70}	—	November 18, 2009	Kitt Peak	Spacewatch	NYS	1.0 km	MPC · JPL
384406	2009 WZ_{70}	—	November 18, 2009	Kitt Peak	Spacewatch	NYS	900 m	MPC · JPL
384407	2009 WF_{84}	—	November 19, 2009	Kitt Peak	Spacewatch	·	1.2 km	MPC · JPL
384408	2009 WH_{93}	—	November 19, 2009	La Sagra	OAM	·	1.9 km	MPC · JPL
384409	2009 WK_{93}	—	November 19, 2009	La Sagra	OAM	·	1.7 km	MPC · JPL
384410	2009 WM_{126}	—	November 20, 2009	Kitt Peak	Spacewatch	·	1.4 km	MPC · JPL
384411	2009 WK_{143}	—	September 28, 2009	Kitt Peak	Spacewatch	·	1.1 km	MPC · JPL
384412	2009 WJ_{165}	—	November 21, 2009	Kitt Peak	Spacewatch	KON	1.7 km	MPC · JPL
384413	2009 WN_{166}	—	November 21, 2009	Mount Lemmon	Mount Lemmon Survey	(5)	1.4 km	MPC · JPL
384414	2009 WZ_{167}	—	November 22, 2009	Kitt Peak	Spacewatch	·	1.4 km	MPC · JPL
384415	2009 WR_{176}	—	November 23, 2009	Kitt Peak	Spacewatch	CLA	1.2 km	MPC · JPL
384416	2009 WZ_{194}	—	November 17, 2009	Catalina	CSS	·	2.3 km	MPC · JPL
384417	2009 WO_{196}	—	November 25, 2009	Catalina	CSS	·	1.4 km	MPC · JPL
384418	2009 WQ_{204}	—	November 9, 2009	Kitt Peak	Spacewatch	·	1.3 km	MPC · JPL
384419	2009 WD_{225}	—	November 17, 2009	Mount Lemmon	Mount Lemmon Survey	·	610 m	MPC · JPL
384420	2009 WJ_{230}	—	November 17, 2009	Mount Lemmon	Mount Lemmon Survey	·	1.8 km	MPC · JPL
384421	2009 WY_{234}	—	November 19, 2009	Catalina	CSS	·	1.6 km	MPC · JPL
384422	2009 WQ_{262}	—	November 21, 2009	Mount Lemmon	Mount Lemmon Survey	·	2.0 km	MPC · JPL
384423	2009 WE_{263}	—	November 25, 2009	Kitt Peak	Spacewatch	·	1.7 km	MPC · JPL
384424	2009 XX_{1}	—	October 16, 2009	Catalina	CSS	·	1.1 km	MPC · JPL
384425	2009 XY_{8}	—	December 13, 2009	Bisei SG Center	BATTeRS	WIT	1.1 km	MPC · JPL
384426	2009 XL_{13}	—	December 13, 2009	Mount Lemmon	Mount Lemmon Survey	·	860 m	MPC · JPL
384427	2009 XM_{16}	—	December 15, 2009	Mount Lemmon	Mount Lemmon Survey	·	2.0 km	MPC · JPL
384428	2009 XR_{17}	—	December 15, 2009	Mount Lemmon	Mount Lemmon Survey	·	1.9 km	MPC · JPL
384429	2009 XY_{20}	—	December 15, 2009	Mount Lemmon	Mount Lemmon Survey	·	1.3 km	MPC · JPL
384430	2009 XM_{22}	—	December 15, 2009	Mount Lemmon	Mount Lemmon Survey	·	2.0 km	MPC · JPL
384431	2009 XX_{22}	—	December 15, 2009	Mount Lemmon	Mount Lemmon Survey	·	1.6 km	MPC · JPL
384432	2009 YQ_{2}	—	September 10, 2004	Kitt Peak	Spacewatch	NYS	1.4 km	MPC · JPL
384433	2009 YN_{14}	—	December 18, 2009	Mount Lemmon	Mount Lemmon Survey	·	870 m	MPC · JPL
384434	2009 YS_{14}	—	December 18, 2009	Mount Lemmon	Mount Lemmon Survey	NYS	1.2 km	MPC · JPL
384435	2009 YZ_{20}	—	December 27, 2009	Kitt Peak	Spacewatch	·	1.2 km	MPC · JPL
384436	2009 YC_{23}	—	December 20, 2009	Mount Lemmon	Mount Lemmon Survey	·	1.9 km	MPC · JPL
384437	2009 YQ_{23}	—	December 19, 2009	Kitt Peak	Spacewatch	(5)	1.9 km	MPC · JPL
384438	2010 AU_{5}	—	January 5, 2010	Kitt Peak	Spacewatch	EUN	1.8 km	MPC · JPL
384439	2010 AG_{12}	—	January 6, 2010	Catalina	CSS	·	1.5 km	MPC · JPL
384440	2010 AD_{21}	—	January 5, 2010	Kitt Peak	Spacewatch	(5)	1.2 km	MPC · JPL
384441	2010 AX_{24}	—	January 6, 2010	Kitt Peak	Spacewatch	·	3.4 km	MPC · JPL
384442	2010 AL_{25}	—	September 3, 2008	Kitt Peak	Spacewatch	·	1.6 km	MPC · JPL
384443	2010 AQ_{25}	—	November 21, 2009	Mount Lemmon	Mount Lemmon Survey	GEF	1.6 km	MPC · JPL
384444	2010 AV_{30}	—	November 15, 2009	Mount Lemmon	Mount Lemmon Survey	·	2.2 km	MPC · JPL
384445	2010 AW_{30}	—	January 6, 2010	Kitt Peak	Spacewatch	·	1.8 km	MPC · JPL
384446	2010 AD_{59}	—	January 6, 2010	Catalina	CSS	HNS	1.5 km	MPC · JPL
384447	2010 AA_{64}	—	August 22, 2004	Kitt Peak	Spacewatch	·	1 km	MPC · JPL
384448	2010 AU_{65}	—	January 11, 2010	Kitt Peak	Spacewatch	·	1.9 km	MPC · JPL
384449	2010 AL_{66}	—	January 11, 2010	Kitt Peak	Spacewatch	·	1.5 km	MPC · JPL
384450	2010 AX_{68}	—	October 11, 2005	Kitt Peak	Spacewatch	·	1.1 km	MPC · JPL
384451	2010 AC_{71}	—	September 5, 2008	Kitt Peak	Spacewatch	·	2.2 km	MPC · JPL
384452	2010 AB_{73}	—	January 13, 2010	Mount Lemmon	Mount Lemmon Survey	·	2.4 km	MPC · JPL
384453	2010 AG_{86}	—	January 8, 2010	WISE	WISE	·	2.6 km	MPC · JPL
384454	2010 AS_{99}	—	January 12, 2010	WISE	WISE	·	4.6 km	MPC · JPL
384455	2010 AY_{117}	—	January 13, 2010	WISE	WISE	·	4.6 km	MPC · JPL
384456	2010 BW_{1}	—	January 7, 2010	Kitt Peak	Spacewatch	·	2.9 km	MPC · JPL
384457	2010 BY_{1}	—	October 8, 2008	Mount Lemmon	Mount Lemmon Survey	·	2.2 km	MPC · JPL
384458	2010 BM_{2}	—	January 18, 2010	Gnosca	S. Sposetti	·	1.2 km	MPC · JPL
384459	2010 BM_{4}	—	January 24, 2010	Piszkés-tető	Kelemen, J.	·	1.6 km	MPC · JPL
384460	2010 BC_{5}	—	January 23, 2010	Bisei SG Center	BATTeRS	·	1.4 km	MPC · JPL
384461	2010 BS_{7}	—	January 16, 2010	WISE	WISE	DOR	3.1 km	MPC · JPL
384462	2010 BX_{20}	—	January 17, 2010	WISE	WISE	·	6.8 km	MPC · JPL
384463	2010 BM_{57}	—	January 21, 2010	WISE	WISE	·	3.7 km	MPC · JPL
384464	2010 BO_{57}	—	January 21, 2010	WISE	WISE	·	4.6 km	MPC · JPL
384465	2010 BQ_{65}	—	April 14, 2010	Mount Lemmon	Mount Lemmon Survey	·	2.4 km	MPC · JPL
384466	2010 BK_{71}	—	January 22, 2010	WISE	WISE	·	5.7 km	MPC · JPL
384467	2010 BL_{74}	—	January 13, 1996	Kitt Peak	Spacewatch	·	2.5 km	MPC · JPL
384468	2010 BU_{75}	—	September 26, 2006	Mount Lemmon	Mount Lemmon Survey	·	3.5 km	MPC · JPL
384469	2010 CV_{2}	—	November 27, 2009	Mount Lemmon	Mount Lemmon Survey	·	2.3 km	MPC · JPL
384470	2010 CO_{3}	—	February 5, 2010	Kitt Peak	Spacewatch	·	3.0 km	MPC · JPL
384471	2010 CU_{3}	—	August 10, 2007	Kitt Peak	Spacewatch	·	2.4 km	MPC · JPL
384472	2010 CY_{24}	—	September 23, 2008	Mount Lemmon	Mount Lemmon Survey	·	1.6 km	MPC · JPL
384473	2010 CE_{26}	—	September 21, 2008	Kitt Peak	Spacewatch	·	1.6 km	MPC · JPL
384474	2010 CX_{28}	—	February 9, 2010	Kitt Peak	Spacewatch	·	2.0 km	MPC · JPL
384475	2010 CT_{34}	—	February 10, 2010	Kitt Peak	Spacewatch	ADE	2.2 km	MPC · JPL
384476	2010 CY_{37}	—	September 29, 2008	Mount Lemmon	Mount Lemmon Survey	·	1.7 km	MPC · JPL
384477	2010 CN_{38}	—	February 13, 2010	Catalina	CSS	·	1.4 km	MPC · JPL
384478	2010 CF_{39}	—	February 13, 2010	Mount Lemmon	Mount Lemmon Survey	·	1.4 km	MPC · JPL
384479	2010 CF_{40}	—	February 13, 2010	Kitt Peak	Spacewatch	·	1.7 km	MPC · JPL
384480	2010 CA_{42}	—	February 6, 2010	Mount Lemmon	Mount Lemmon Survey	·	1.5 km	MPC · JPL
384481	2010 CR_{42}	—	February 7, 2010	La Sagra	OAM	HNS	1.5 km	MPC · JPL
384482	2010 CH_{43}	—	February 13, 2010	Mount Lemmon	Mount Lemmon Survey	·	1.1 km	MPC · JPL
384483	2010 CU_{44}	—	February 15, 2010	Calvin-Rehoboth	Calvin College	EUN	1.7 km	MPC · JPL
384484	2010 CZ_{56}	—	February 13, 2010	Catalina	CSS	·	2.1 km	MPC · JPL
384485	2010 CA_{57}	—	February 13, 2010	Socorro	LINEAR	·	3.3 km	MPC · JPL
384486	2010 CP_{59}	—	September 21, 2008	Mount Lemmon	Mount Lemmon Survey	·	2.4 km	MPC · JPL
384487	2010 CW_{62}	—	February 9, 2010	Catalina	CSS	·	2.7 km	MPC · JPL
384488	2010 CG_{65}	—	February 9, 2010	Kitt Peak	Spacewatch	·	1.5 km	MPC · JPL
384489	2010 CH_{65}	—	February 9, 2010	Kitt Peak	Spacewatch	·	1.5 km	MPC · JPL
384490	2010 CS_{65}	—	February 9, 2010	Kitt Peak	Spacewatch	·	2.7 km	MPC · JPL
384491	2010 CS_{66}	—	February 10, 2010	Kitt Peak	Spacewatch	·	3.3 km	MPC · JPL
384492	2010 CT_{74}	—	February 13, 2010	Mount Lemmon	Mount Lemmon Survey	MIS	2.2 km	MPC · JPL
384493	2010 CC_{76}	—	February 13, 2010	Kitt Peak	Spacewatch	DOR	2.6 km	MPC · JPL
384494	2010 CB_{79}	—	February 13, 2010	Catalina	CSS	·	3.2 km	MPC · JPL
384495	2010 CQ_{80}	—	February 3, 2000	Kitt Peak	Spacewatch	KOR	1.7 km	MPC · JPL
384496	2010 CE_{82}	—	February 13, 2010	Kitt Peak	Spacewatch	·	2.7 km	MPC · JPL
384497	2010 CM_{85}	—	October 7, 2008	Mount Lemmon	Mount Lemmon Survey	NEM	2.4 km	MPC · JPL
384498	2010 CM_{91}	—	February 14, 2010	Mount Lemmon	Mount Lemmon Survey	HOF	3.1 km	MPC · JPL
384499	2010 CV_{93}	—	February 14, 2010	Kitt Peak	Spacewatch	·	1.3 km	MPC · JPL
384500	2010 CL_{95}	—	February 14, 2010	Kitt Peak	Spacewatch	·	3.1 km	MPC · JPL

== 384501–384600 ==
back to top

Designation			Discovery			Properties		Ref
Permanent	Provisional	Named after	Date	Site	Discoverer(s)	Category	Diam.	Ref
384501	2010 CJ_{108}	—	February 14, 2010	Mount Lemmon	Mount Lemmon Survey	·	1.4 km	MPC · JPL
384502	2010 CF_{109}	—	September 24, 2008	Mount Lemmon	Mount Lemmon Survey	·	1.2 km	MPC · JPL
384503	2010 CN_{109}	—	February 14, 2010	Mount Lemmon	Mount Lemmon Survey	·	1.8 km	MPC · JPL
384504	2010 CR_{114}	—	September 10, 2004	Kitt Peak	Spacewatch	(5)	1.1 km	MPC · JPL
384505	2010 CY_{117}	—	February 15, 2010	Kitt Peak	Spacewatch	·	2.2 km	MPC · JPL
384506	2010 CJ_{120}	—	February 15, 2010	Catalina	CSS	·	2.2 km	MPC · JPL
384507	2010 CL_{120}	—	February 15, 2010	Catalina	CSS	·	1.5 km	MPC · JPL
384508	2010 CU_{123}	—	November 27, 2009	Mount Lemmon	Mount Lemmon Survey	(5)	2.5 km	MPC · JPL
384509	2010 CR_{138}	—	February 15, 2010	Mount Lemmon	Mount Lemmon Survey	·	920 m	MPC · JPL
384510	2010 CS_{139}	—	February 15, 2010	Catalina	CSS	·	2.2 km	MPC · JPL
384511	2010 CU_{143}	—	February 9, 2010	Catalina	CSS	·	3.1 km	MPC · JPL
384512	2010 CE_{146}	—	February 15, 2010	Catalina	CSS	HNS	1.5 km	MPC · JPL
384513	2010 CA_{157}	—	February 15, 2010	Mount Lemmon	Mount Lemmon Survey	·	2.2 km	MPC · JPL
384514	2010 CW_{158}	—	February 15, 2010	Kitt Peak	Spacewatch	·	1.5 km	MPC · JPL
384515	2010 CY_{180}	—	February 13, 2010	Haleakala	Pan-STARRS 1	MIS	1.9 km	MPC · JPL
384516	2010 CP_{182}	—	February 14, 2010	Haleakala	Pan-STARRS 1	·	1.3 km	MPC · JPL
384517	2010 CQ_{182}	—	October 1, 2008	Kitt Peak	Spacewatch	HOF	3.6 km	MPC · JPL
384518	2010 CG_{218}	—	February 7, 2010	WISE	WISE	·	4.4 km	MPC · JPL
384519	2010 CA_{249}	—	July 18, 2007	Mount Lemmon	Mount Lemmon Survey	·	2.4 km	MPC · JPL
384520	2010 DR_{1}	—	February 17, 2010	Socorro	LINEAR	·	3.9 km	MPC · JPL
384521	2010 DT_{6}	—	February 16, 2010	Kitt Peak	Spacewatch	·	1.7 km	MPC · JPL
384522	2010 DE_{11}	—	February 16, 2010	Mount Lemmon	Mount Lemmon Survey	·	2.0 km	MPC · JPL
384523	2010 DE_{22}	—	February 17, 2010	WISE	WISE	·	5.5 km	MPC · JPL
384524	2010 DF_{22}	—	February 17, 2010	WISE	WISE	·	4.3 km	MPC · JPL
384525	2010 DB_{36}	—	January 8, 2010	Kitt Peak	Spacewatch	·	1.5 km	MPC · JPL
384526	2010 DC_{36}	—	February 16, 2010	Kitt Peak	Spacewatch	·	2.5 km	MPC · JPL
384527	2010 DD_{36}	—	February 16, 2010	Kitt Peak	Spacewatch	(5)	2.3 km	MPC · JPL
384528	2010 DV_{38}	—	December 20, 2004	Mount Lemmon	Mount Lemmon Survey	·	2.3 km	MPC · JPL
384529	2010 DK_{40}	—	February 16, 2010	Kitt Peak	Spacewatch	AGN	1.3 km	MPC · JPL
384530	2010 DQ_{45}	—	February 17, 2010	Kitt Peak	Spacewatch	·	1.7 km	MPC · JPL
384531	2010 DG_{53}	—	February 22, 2010	WISE	WISE	·	3.8 km	MPC · JPL
384532	2010 DO_{54}	—	November 1, 2008	Mount Lemmon	Mount Lemmon Survey	·	1.9 km	MPC · JPL
384533 Tenerelli	2010 DT_{56}	Tenerelli	February 23, 2010	WISE	WISE	·	3.7 km	MPC · JPL
384534	2010 DG_{73}	—	February 27, 2010	WISE	WISE	·	4.8 km	MPC · JPL
384535	2010 DN_{76}	—	February 17, 2010	Kitt Peak	Spacewatch	·	2.2 km	MPC · JPL
384536	2010 DE_{77}	—	September 27, 2008	Mount Lemmon	Mount Lemmon Survey	EUN	1.5 km	MPC · JPL
384537	2010 DU_{77}	—	February 16, 2010	Haleakala	Pan-STARRS 1	BRA	1.9 km	MPC · JPL
384538	2010 EH_{1}	—	March 1, 2010	WISE	WISE	·	3.7 km	MPC · JPL
384539	2010 EA_{21}	—	March 9, 2010	Taunus	E. Schwab, R. Kling	·	4.0 km	MPC · JPL
384540	2010 ED_{33}	—	October 26, 2008	Mount Lemmon	Mount Lemmon Survey	·	1.8 km	MPC · JPL
384541	2010 EU_{34}	—	March 10, 2010	La Sagra	OAM	AGN	1.6 km	MPC · JPL
384542	2010 EW_{36}	—	March 4, 2010	Kitt Peak	Spacewatch	·	2.5 km	MPC · JPL
384543	2010 EM_{39}	—	March 10, 2010	La Sagra	OAM	·	2.1 km	MPC · JPL
384544	2010 ER_{39}	—	March 10, 2010	La Sagra	OAM	·	1.6 km	MPC · JPL
384545	2010 EP_{75}	—	February 13, 2010	Mount Lemmon	Mount Lemmon Survey	·	1.8 km	MPC · JPL
384546	2010 EZ_{78}	—	March 12, 2010	Mount Lemmon	Mount Lemmon Survey	AGN	1.1 km	MPC · JPL
384547	2010 EH_{79}	—	March 12, 2010	Mount Lemmon	Mount Lemmon Survey	·	2.0 km	MPC · JPL
384548	2010 EY_{110}	—	March 12, 2010	Kitt Peak	Spacewatch	·	2.1 km	MPC · JPL
384549	2010 EX_{111}	—	March 12, 2010	Kitt Peak	Spacewatch	·	4.1 km	MPC · JPL
384550	2010 ET_{113}	—	March 5, 2010	Catalina	CSS	·	2.2 km	MPC · JPL
384551	2010 EP_{121}	—	November 3, 2008	Mount Lemmon	Mount Lemmon Survey	·	1.8 km	MPC · JPL
384552	2010 EK_{123}	—	March 15, 2010	Kitt Peak	Spacewatch	·	3.2 km	MPC · JPL
384553	2010 ES_{157}	—	November 23, 1995	Kitt Peak	Spacewatch	HYG	5.2 km	MPC · JPL
384554	2010 FH_{6}	—	March 16, 2010	Kitt Peak	Spacewatch	·	1.9 km	MPC · JPL
384555	2010 FO_{11}	—	February 18, 2010	Mount Lemmon	Mount Lemmon Survey	·	3.2 km	MPC · JPL
384556	2010 FK_{13}	—	March 16, 2010	Purple Mountain	PMO NEO Survey Program	JUN	1.2 km	MPC · JPL
384557	2010 FL_{18}	—	November 18, 2008	Kitt Peak	Spacewatch	·	2.0 km	MPC · JPL
384558	2010 FF_{28}	—	March 20, 2010	Mount Lemmon	Mount Lemmon Survey	·	3.4 km	MPC · JPL
384559	2010 FL_{28}	—	March 5, 2006	Kitt Peak	Spacewatch	·	2.2 km	MPC · JPL
384560	2010 FO_{30}	—	March 18, 2010	Kitt Peak	Spacewatch	EOS	2.4 km	MPC · JPL
384561	2010 FH_{55}	—	March 23, 2010	Mount Lemmon	Mount Lemmon Survey	·	1.9 km	MPC · JPL
384562	2010 FM_{90}	—	March 21, 2010	Kitt Peak	Spacewatch	·	2.2 km	MPC · JPL
384563	2010 FN_{100}	—	March 12, 2010	Mount Lemmon	Mount Lemmon Survey	EOS	1.8 km	MPC · JPL
384564	2010 GX_{96}	—	April 4, 2010	Kitt Peak	Spacewatch	·	2.0 km	MPC · JPL
384565	2010 GA_{97}	—	April 5, 2010	Kitt Peak	Spacewatch	·	2.6 km	MPC · JPL
384566	2010 GV_{99}	—	April 4, 2010	Kitt Peak	Spacewatch	·	2.4 km	MPC · JPL
384567	2010 GE_{105}	—	September 22, 2008	Kitt Peak	Spacewatch	·	1.2 km	MPC · JPL
384568	2010 GL_{105}	—	April 7, 2010	Kitt Peak	Spacewatch	·	3.3 km	MPC · JPL
384569	2010 GA_{122}	—	April 12, 2010	Mount Lemmon	Mount Lemmon Survey	·	2.7 km	MPC · JPL
384570	2010 GA_{127}	—	March 21, 2010	Mount Lemmon	Mount Lemmon Survey	·	3.2 km	MPC · JPL
384571	2010 GB_{134}	—	October 29, 2003	Anderson Mesa	LONEOS	AGN	1.6 km	MPC · JPL
384572	2010 GO_{157}	—	April 10, 2010	Mount Lemmon	Mount Lemmon Survey	·	2.7 km	MPC · JPL
384573	2010 GQ_{171}	—	January 15, 2005	Kitt Peak	Spacewatch	·	3.0 km	MPC · JPL
384574	2010 GJ_{172}	—	May 25, 1995	Kitt Peak	Spacewatch	·	1.8 km	MPC · JPL
384575	2010 GS_{172}	—	May 12, 2005	Mount Lemmon	Mount Lemmon Survey	·	3.6 km	MPC · JPL
384576	2010 GW_{173}	—	December 22, 2000	Kitt Peak	Spacewatch	·	2.1 km	MPC · JPL
384577	2010 GX_{173}	—	October 10, 2012	Mount Lemmon	Mount Lemmon Survey	·	1.6 km	MPC · JPL
384578	2010 HL_{14}	—	October 8, 2008	Mount Lemmon	Mount Lemmon Survey	·	1.8 km	MPC · JPL
384579	2010 HO_{15}	—	November 19, 2009	Mount Lemmon	Mount Lemmon Survey	·	3.1 km	MPC · JPL
384580	2010 HU_{108}	—	April 26, 2010	Mount Lemmon	Mount Lemmon Survey	(21885)	4.0 km	MPC · JPL
384581	2010 HA_{114}	—	March 20, 2010	Catalina	CSS	GEF	1.8 km	MPC · JPL
384582 Juliasmith	2010 JS_{14}	Juliasmith	May 2, 2010	WISE	WISE	ERI	2.5 km	MPC · JPL
384583	2010 JC_{44}	—	April 13, 2010	Vail	Observatory, Jarnac	EUN	2.1 km	MPC · JPL
384584 Jenniferlawrence	2010 JL_{85}	Jenniferlawrence	May 5, 2010	Siding Spring	SSS	·	3.5 km	MPC · JPL
384585	2010 JM_{110}	—	May 6, 2010	Kitt Peak	Spacewatch	EOS	2.3 km	MPC · JPL
384586	2010 JJ_{117}	—	May 4, 2010	Kitt Peak	Spacewatch	·	2.2 km	MPC · JPL
384587	2010 JJ_{122}	—	February 14, 2010	Mount Lemmon	Mount Lemmon Survey	TEL	1.7 km	MPC · JPL
384588	2010 JS_{151}	—	April 9, 2010	Kitt Peak	Spacewatch	·	4.1 km	MPC · JPL
384589	2010 JD_{178}	—	September 14, 1998	Kitt Peak	Spacewatch	·	2.7 km	MPC · JPL
384590	2010 KK_{32}	—	May 19, 2010	WISE	WISE	·	2.3 km	MPC · JPL
384591	2010 LR_{14}	—	June 3, 2010	Kitt Peak	Spacewatch	·	3.9 km	MPC · JPL
384592	2010 LX_{30}	—	June 6, 2010	WISE	WISE	·	3.2 km	MPC · JPL
384593	2010 LV_{87}	—	October 19, 2007	Catalina	CSS	·	4.5 km	MPC · JPL
384594	2010 LM_{125}	—	March 20, 2010	Siding Spring	SSS	ADE	3.0 km	MPC · JPL
384595	2010 OV_{13}	—	January 27, 2010	WISE	WISE	·	5.3 km	MPC · JPL
384596	2010 OL_{17}	—	July 17, 2010	WISE	WISE	·	5.3 km	MPC · JPL
384597	2010 OE_{36}	—	June 6, 2005	Kitt Peak	Spacewatch	EUP	5.7 km	MPC · JPL
384598	2010 OY_{63}	—	July 24, 2010	WISE	WISE	·	3.8 km	MPC · JPL
384599	2010 OA_{64}	—	April 9, 2010	Mount Lemmon	Mount Lemmon Survey	EOS ·	3.6 km	MPC · JPL
384600	2010 OV_{97}	—	July 28, 2010	WISE	WISE	LIX	5.1 km	MPC · JPL

== 384601–384700 ==
back to top

Designation			Discovery			Properties		Ref
Permanent	Provisional	Named after	Date	Site	Discoverer(s)	Category	Diam.	Ref
384601	2010 OW_{101}	—	July 28, 2010	WISE	WISE	·	2.7 km	MPC · JPL
384602	2010 RM_{167}	—	September 10, 2010	La Sagra	OAM	H	790 m	MPC · JPL
384603	2010 TM_{20}	—	October 1, 2010	Catalina	CSS	H	620 m	MPC · JPL
384604	2010 TJ_{177}	—	May 19, 2004	Socorro	LINEAR	H	620 m	MPC · JPL
384605	2010 UC_{76}	—	August 31, 2003	Kitt Peak	Spacewatch	·	500 m	MPC · JPL
384606	2010 XA_{35}	—	March 25, 2009	Mount Lemmon	Mount Lemmon Survey	H	610 m	MPC · JPL
384607	2011 AJ_{10}	—	October 17, 2003	Kitt Peak	Spacewatch	·	750 m	MPC · JPL
384608	2011 AW_{40}	—	November 28, 2000	Kitt Peak	Spacewatch	·	630 m	MPC · JPL
384609	2011 BJ_{29}	—	November 24, 2003	Kitt Peak	Spacewatch	·	560 m	MPC · JPL
384610	2011 BU_{40}	—	October 17, 2003	Kitt Peak	Spacewatch	·	740 m	MPC · JPL
384611	2011 BN_{72}	—	September 16, 2009	Kitt Peak	Spacewatch	·	1.2 km	MPC · JPL
384612	2011 BQ_{81}	—	November 15, 2006	Kitt Peak	Spacewatch	V	710 m	MPC · JPL
384613	2011 BB_{101}	—	October 18, 2006	Kitt Peak	Spacewatch	·	1.1 km	MPC · JPL
384614	2011 BP_{115}	—	January 13, 2011	Kitt Peak	Spacewatch	·	750 m	MPC · JPL
384615	2011 CC_{6}	—	December 19, 2003	Socorro	LINEAR	·	640 m	MPC · JPL
384616	2011 CH_{8}	—	March 7, 2008	Kitt Peak	Spacewatch	·	800 m	MPC · JPL
384617	2011 CG_{17}	—	April 8, 2008	Kitt Peak	Spacewatch	·	720 m	MPC · JPL
384618	2011 CM_{29}	—	September 27, 2006	Catalina	CSS	·	740 m	MPC · JPL
384619	2011 CV_{73}	—	April 3, 2008	Mount Lemmon	Mount Lemmon Survey	·	770 m	MPC · JPL
384620	2011 CJ_{82}	—	September 28, 2009	Kitt Peak	Spacewatch	·	720 m	MPC · JPL
384621	2011 CW_{87}	—	March 18, 2004	Socorro	LINEAR	·	1.1 km	MPC · JPL
384622	2011 CD_{90}	—	September 22, 2009	Kitt Peak	Spacewatch	·	690 m	MPC · JPL
384623	2011 CE_{102}	—	November 11, 2006	Mount Lemmon	Mount Lemmon Survey	·	580 m	MPC · JPL
384624	2011 CY_{106}	—	August 28, 2006	Kitt Peak	Spacewatch	·	570 m	MPC · JPL
384625	2011 CJ_{117}	—	June 17, 2005	Mount Lemmon	Mount Lemmon Survey	V	770 m	MPC · JPL
384626	2011 CR_{117}	—	July 16, 2001	Anderson Mesa	LONEOS	·	1.6 km	MPC · JPL
384627	2011 DE	—	February 10, 2007	Mount Lemmon	Mount Lemmon Survey	·	1.6 km	MPC · JPL
384628	2011 DA_{4}	—	December 14, 2010	Mount Lemmon	Mount Lemmon Survey	·	970 m	MPC · JPL
384629	2011 DJ_{18}	—	December 9, 2006	Kitt Peak	Spacewatch	·	820 m	MPC · JPL
384630	2011 DV_{18}	—	April 26, 2008	Kitt Peak	Spacewatch	·	770 m	MPC · JPL
384631	2011 DS_{24}	—	September 28, 2009	Mount Lemmon	Mount Lemmon Survey	·	1.0 km	MPC · JPL
384632	2011 DM_{25}	—	October 3, 2003	Kitt Peak	Spacewatch	·	690 m	MPC · JPL
384633	2011 DU_{41}	—	February 25, 2011	Mount Lemmon	Mount Lemmon Survey	NYS	1.3 km	MPC · JPL
384634	2011 EL_{6}	—	October 2, 2006	Mount Lemmon	Mount Lemmon Survey	·	750 m	MPC · JPL
384635	2011 EP_{19}	—	April 29, 2008	Kitt Peak	Spacewatch	·	770 m	MPC · JPL
384636	2011 EB_{23}	—	April 27, 2000	Kitt Peak	Spacewatch	·	1.4 km	MPC · JPL
384637	2011 EZ_{38}	—	September 17, 2009	Kitt Peak	Spacewatch	·	840 m	MPC · JPL
384638	2011 EU_{40}	—	June 10, 2004	Socorro	LINEAR	PHO	1.2 km	MPC · JPL
384639	2011 EY_{42}	—	August 7, 2008	Kitt Peak	Spacewatch	·	1.8 km	MPC · JPL
384640	2011 EM_{44}	—	March 18, 2004	Kitt Peak	Spacewatch	·	930 m	MPC · JPL
384641	2011 EF_{45}	—	November 17, 2006	Mount Lemmon	Mount Lemmon Survey	·	930 m	MPC · JPL
384642	2011 ED_{52}	—	November 17, 2009	Mount Lemmon	Mount Lemmon Survey	·	1.1 km	MPC · JPL
384643	2011 EU_{62}	—	March 12, 2011	Mount Lemmon	Mount Lemmon Survey	(194)	1.6 km	MPC · JPL
384644	2011 ES_{69}	—	February 13, 2004	Kitt Peak	Spacewatch	(2076)	930 m	MPC · JPL
384645	2011 EN_{71}	—	December 11, 2006	Kitt Peak	Spacewatch	·	1.1 km	MPC · JPL
384646	2011 EV_{76}	—	July 9, 2005	Kitt Peak	Spacewatch	·	840 m	MPC · JPL
384647	2011 EJ_{79}	—	March 4, 1994	Kitt Peak	Spacewatch	·	780 m	MPC · JPL
384648	2011 EA_{86}	—	October 1, 2005	Kitt Peak	Spacewatch	·	1.3 km	MPC · JPL
384649	2011 FK_{2}	—	March 13, 2011	Kitt Peak	Spacewatch	·	1.5 km	MPC · JPL
384650	2011 FN_{3}	—	January 5, 2000	Kitt Peak	Spacewatch	NYS	1.0 km	MPC · JPL
384651	2011 FR_{3}	—	May 16, 2008	Kitt Peak	Spacewatch	·	700 m	MPC · JPL
384652	2011 FY_{6}	—	March 15, 2004	Kitt Peak	Spacewatch	·	970 m	MPC · JPL
384653	2011 FQ_{9}	—	December 19, 2003	Kitt Peak	Spacewatch	·	730 m	MPC · JPL
384654	2011 FD_{11}	—	November 25, 2006	Kitt Peak	Spacewatch	·	630 m	MPC · JPL
384655	2011 FG_{11}	—	October 31, 2006	Kitt Peak	Spacewatch	·	750 m	MPC · JPL
384656	2011 FK_{13}	—	May 9, 2004	Kitt Peak	Spacewatch	·	900 m	MPC · JPL
384657	2011 FQ_{15}	—	April 18, 2007	Kitt Peak	Spacewatch	(5)	1.2 km	MPC · JPL
384658	2011 FB_{16}	—	September 23, 2008	Mount Lemmon	Mount Lemmon Survey	·	1.9 km	MPC · JPL
384659	2011 FN_{17}	—	April 20, 2004	Siding Spring	SSS	·	1.0 km	MPC · JPL
384660	2011 FF_{18}	—	March 8, 2005	Kitt Peak	Spacewatch	HYG	3.7 km	MPC · JPL
384661	2011 FZ_{18}	—	March 27, 2011	Mount Lemmon	Mount Lemmon Survey	·	1.7 km	MPC · JPL
384662	2011 FF_{23}	—	October 24, 2009	Kitt Peak	Spacewatch	·	900 m	MPC · JPL
384663	2011 FP_{28}	—	July 20, 2004	Siding Spring	SSS	·	2.0 km	MPC · JPL
384664	2011 FD_{33}	—	January 28, 2007	Kitt Peak	Spacewatch	·	1.1 km	MPC · JPL
384665	2011 FP_{33}	—	March 15, 2004	Catalina	CSS	·	810 m	MPC · JPL
384666	2011 FE_{35}	—	July 4, 2005	Mount Lemmon	Mount Lemmon Survey	·	990 m	MPC · JPL
384667	2011 FU_{37}	—	November 22, 2009	Mount Lemmon	Mount Lemmon Survey	·	990 m	MPC · JPL
384668	2011 FX_{48}	—	May 15, 2004	Socorro	LINEAR	V	830 m	MPC · JPL
384669	2011 FL_{49}	—	December 12, 2006	Kitt Peak	Spacewatch	·	1.1 km	MPC · JPL
384670	2011 FM_{55}	—	May 13, 2004	Kitt Peak	Spacewatch	·	1.2 km	MPC · JPL
384671	2011 FF_{61}	—	February 23, 2007	Kitt Peak	Spacewatch	·	1.1 km	MPC · JPL
384672	2011 FX_{63}	—	September 26, 2009	Kitt Peak	Spacewatch	·	670 m	MPC · JPL
384673	2011 FN_{70}	—	April 19, 2004	Kitt Peak	Spacewatch	·	760 m	MPC · JPL
384674	2011 FX_{78}	—	March 2, 2011	Kitt Peak	Spacewatch	·	870 m	MPC · JPL
384675	2011 FT_{83}	—	February 29, 2000	Socorro	LINEAR	NYS	1.0 km	MPC · JPL
384676	2011 FC_{86}	—	December 1, 2006	Mount Lemmon	Mount Lemmon Survey	·	890 m	MPC · JPL
384677	2011 FT_{133}	—	September 17, 2004	Kitt Peak	Spacewatch	·	1.7 km	MPC · JPL
384678	2011 FM_{152}	—	September 29, 2005	Kitt Peak	Spacewatch	·	940 m	MPC · JPL
384679	2011 GR_{3}	—	November 24, 2009	Kitt Peak	Spacewatch	·	740 m	MPC · JPL
384680	2011 GH_{11}	—	March 3, 1997	Kitt Peak	Spacewatch	(2076)	810 m	MPC · JPL
384681	2011 GJ_{30}	—	May 13, 2004	Kitt Peak	Spacewatch	·	890 m	MPC · JPL
384682	2011 GX_{30}	—	November 20, 2006	Mount Lemmon	Mount Lemmon Survey	NYS	800 m	MPC · JPL
384683	2011 GD_{31}	—	September 2, 2008	Kitt Peak	Spacewatch	·	1.4 km	MPC · JPL
384684	2011 GO_{32}	—	December 26, 2009	Kitt Peak	Spacewatch	·	2.2 km	MPC · JPL
384685	2011 GV_{32}	—	January 17, 2007	Catalina	CSS	fast	1.3 km	MPC · JPL
384686	2011 GS_{35}	—	December 27, 2006	Mount Lemmon	Mount Lemmon Survey	·	1.2 km	MPC · JPL
384687	2011 GX_{57}	—	October 16, 2009	Mount Lemmon	Mount Lemmon Survey	·	810 m	MPC · JPL
384688	2011 GF_{58}	—	April 22, 2007	Mount Lemmon	Mount Lemmon Survey	·	1.1 km	MPC · JPL
384689	2011 GJ_{59}	—	March 23, 2004	Socorro	LINEAR	·	670 m	MPC · JPL
384690	2011 GE_{61}	—	November 26, 2009	Mount Lemmon	Mount Lemmon Survey	·	1.3 km	MPC · JPL
384691	2011 GM_{74}	—	January 28, 2006	Mount Lemmon	Mount Lemmon Survey	·	2.6 km	MPC · JPL
384692	2011 GN_{74}	—	October 23, 2009	Mount Lemmon	Mount Lemmon Survey	·	1.1 km	MPC · JPL
384693	2011 GN_{84}	—	October 20, 2005	Mount Lemmon	Mount Lemmon Survey	V	680 m	MPC · JPL
384694	2011 HR_{1}	—	October 26, 2008	Mount Lemmon	Mount Lemmon Survey	EUN	1.9 km	MPC · JPL
384695	2011 HG_{6}	—	November 27, 2009	Kitt Peak	Spacewatch	·	1.5 km	MPC · JPL
384696	2011 HN_{6}	—	January 4, 2006	Catalina	CSS	·	2.5 km	MPC · JPL
384697	2011 HJ_{9}	—	April 12, 2011	Catalina	CSS	·	1.7 km	MPC · JPL
384698	2011 HH_{11}	—	May 12, 2007	Mount Lemmon	Mount Lemmon Survey	·	1.2 km	MPC · JPL
384699	2011 HQ_{11}	—	May 18, 2010	WISE	WISE	·	4.2 km	MPC · JPL
384700	2011 HV_{11}	—	February 17, 2007	Kitt Peak	Spacewatch	MAS	720 m	MPC · JPL

== 384701–384800 ==
back to top

Designation			Discovery			Properties		Ref
Permanent	Provisional	Named after	Date	Site	Discoverer(s)	Category	Diam.	Ref
384701	2011 HL_{12}	—	April 11, 2011	Mount Lemmon	Mount Lemmon Survey	VER	3.5 km	MPC · JPL
384702	2011 HE_{27}	—	January 27, 2000	Kitt Peak	Spacewatch	·	900 m	MPC · JPL
384703	2011 HP_{27}	—	March 16, 2004	Kitt Peak	Spacewatch	·	840 m	MPC · JPL
384704	2011 HW_{29}	—	October 27, 2005	Kitt Peak	Spacewatch	NYS	1.2 km	MPC · JPL
384705	2011 HQ_{30}	—	January 17, 2007	Kitt Peak	Spacewatch	·	900 m	MPC · JPL
384706	2011 HB_{33}	—	November 4, 2004	Kitt Peak	Spacewatch	·	2.3 km	MPC · JPL
384707	2011 HS_{33}	—	September 29, 2008	Catalina	CSS	·	2.2 km	MPC · JPL
384708	2011 HK_{41}	—	December 20, 2009	Kitt Peak	Spacewatch	EUN	1.3 km	MPC · JPL
384709	2011 HR_{41}	—	March 13, 2007	Kitt Peak	Spacewatch	·	1.5 km	MPC · JPL
384710	2011 HV_{44}	—	October 29, 2008	Kitt Peak	Spacewatch	WIT	1.3 km	MPC · JPL
384711	2011 HH_{51}	—	October 30, 2008	Catalina	CSS	·	2.1 km	MPC · JPL
384712	2011 HM_{51}	—	December 22, 2003	Kitt Peak	Spacewatch	·	3.8 km	MPC · JPL
384713	2011 HR_{55}	—	January 8, 2010	Mount Lemmon	Mount Lemmon Survey	·	1.8 km	MPC · JPL
384714	2011 HF_{56}	—	November 21, 2009	Mount Lemmon	Mount Lemmon Survey	·	3.0 km	MPC · JPL
384715	2011 HU_{58}	—	February 2, 2006	Mount Lemmon	Mount Lemmon Survey	·	1.4 km	MPC · JPL
384716	2011 HW_{58}	—	March 21, 2004	Kitt Peak	Spacewatch	·	1.0 km	MPC · JPL
384717	2011 HT_{70}	—	April 4, 2011	Kitt Peak	Spacewatch	·	2.4 km	MPC · JPL
384718	2011 HL_{78}	—	March 9, 2011	Kitt Peak	Spacewatch	·	870 m	MPC · JPL
384719	2011 HU_{78}	—	October 12, 2004	Anderson Mesa	LONEOS	EUN	1.6 km	MPC · JPL
384720	2011 HC_{92}	—	November 23, 2006	Mount Lemmon	Mount Lemmon Survey	·	820 m	MPC · JPL
384721	2011 HC_{101}	—	October 1, 2005	Mount Lemmon	Mount Lemmon Survey	(194)	2.3 km	MPC · JPL
384722	2011 HN_{102}	—	October 4, 2008	Catalina	CSS	·	2.1 km	MPC · JPL
384723	2011 JG_{5}	—	April 12, 2011	Catalina	CSS	EUN	2.1 km	MPC · JPL
384724	2011 JU_{8}	—	February 16, 2010	Mount Lemmon	Mount Lemmon Survey	·	2.4 km	MPC · JPL
384725	2011 JZ_{16}	—	March 26, 2003	Kitt Peak	Spacewatch	·	1.5 km	MPC · JPL
384726	2011 JC_{27}	—	January 7, 2006	Kitt Peak	Spacewatch	·	1.2 km	MPC · JPL
384727	2011 JN_{29}	—	January 13, 1996	Kitt Peak	Spacewatch	·	2.8 km	MPC · JPL
384728	2011 KT	—	February 27, 2006	Kitt Peak	Spacewatch	·	1.9 km	MPC · JPL
384729	2011 KE_{2}	—	October 29, 2005	Kitt Peak	Spacewatch	·	1.1 km	MPC · JPL
384730	2011 KR_{3}	—	April 3, 2010	WISE	WISE	·	3.5 km	MPC · JPL
384731	2011 KZ_{9}	—	April 23, 2011	Kitt Peak	Spacewatch	·	2.4 km	MPC · JPL
384732	2011 KN_{19}	—	December 27, 2006	Mount Lemmon	Mount Lemmon Survey	NYS	1.0 km	MPC · JPL
384733	2011 KS_{26}	—	May 4, 2011	Siding Spring	SSS	·	3.1 km	MPC · JPL
384734	2011 KT_{32}	—	November 4, 2004	Catalina	CSS	·	2.1 km	MPC · JPL
384735	2011 KZ_{32}	—	December 21, 2008	Mount Lemmon	Mount Lemmon Survey	·	2.3 km	MPC · JPL
384736	2011 KM_{33}	—	February 21, 2007	Mount Lemmon	Mount Lemmon Survey	·	1.1 km	MPC · JPL
384737	2011 LK_{5}	—	November 3, 2008	Mount Lemmon	Mount Lemmon Survey	·	1.8 km	MPC · JPL
384738	2011 LZ_{6}	—	November 18, 2003	Kitt Peak	Spacewatch	AGN	1.5 km	MPC · JPL
384739	2011 LU_{12}	—	January 8, 2010	Catalina	CSS	·	2.9 km	MPC · JPL
384740	2011 LX_{12}	—	October 9, 1996	Kitt Peak	Spacewatch	·	3.8 km	MPC · JPL
384741	2011 LX_{14}	—	December 10, 2009	Mount Lemmon	Mount Lemmon Survey	·	1.5 km	MPC · JPL
384742	2011 LR_{26}	—	December 25, 2005	Kitt Peak	Spacewatch	·	920 m	MPC · JPL
384743	2011 MY_{4}	—	March 11, 2007	Catalina	CSS	·	1.8 km	MPC · JPL
384744	2011 OY_{23}	—	February 2, 2009	Catalina	CSS	·	5.1 km	MPC · JPL
384745	2011 OE_{29}	—	June 8, 2011	Mount Lemmon	Mount Lemmon Survey	·	3.4 km	MPC · JPL
384746	2011 OH_{33}	—	May 29, 2000	Kitt Peak	Spacewatch	·	2.5 km	MPC · JPL
384747	2011 OB_{49}	—	January 7, 2006	Mount Lemmon	Mount Lemmon Survey	·	1.7 km	MPC · JPL
384748	2011 ON_{56}	—	February 6, 2010	Kitt Peak	Spacewatch	EUN	1.4 km	MPC · JPL
384749	2011 PL_{4}	—	September 16, 2006	Catalina	CSS	·	3.3 km	MPC · JPL
384750	2011 QK_{26}	—	September 20, 2003	Kitt Peak	Spacewatch	·	1.5 km	MPC · JPL
384751	2011 QW_{41}	—	March 15, 2004	Kitt Peak	Spacewatch	·	4.3 km	MPC · JPL
384752	2011 QD_{52}	—	December 19, 2004	Mount Lemmon	Mount Lemmon Survey	·	1.7 km	MPC · JPL
384753	2011 QM_{54}	—	April 6, 2010	Catalina	CSS	ADE	3.5 km	MPC · JPL
384754	2011 QD_{58}	—	November 14, 2007	Mount Lemmon	Mount Lemmon Survey	VER	3.3 km	MPC · JPL
384755	2011 QT_{63}	—	February 2, 2001	Kitt Peak	Spacewatch	MAR	2.4 km	MPC · JPL
384756	2011 QD_{75}	—	January 10, 1997	Kitt Peak	Spacewatch	·	4.6 km	MPC · JPL
384757	2011 SR_{14}	—	October 31, 2006	Mount Lemmon	Mount Lemmon Survey	·	2.9 km	MPC · JPL
384758	2011 ST_{263}	—	May 20, 2004	Kitt Peak	Spacewatch	·	3.2 km	MPC · JPL
384759	2011 WL_{90}	—	December 1, 1994	Kitt Peak	Spacewatch	VER	3.3 km	MPC · JPL
384760	2012 FV_{44}	—	June 27, 2004	Siding Spring	SSS	H	690 m	MPC · JPL
384761	2012 HM_{43}	—	December 31, 2007	Kitt Peak	Spacewatch	·	1.1 km	MPC · JPL
384762	2012 HM_{63}	—	December 31, 2007	Kitt Peak	Spacewatch	·	800 m	MPC · JPL
384763	2012 JA_{28}	—	March 5, 2010	WISE	WISE	·	1.7 km	MPC · JPL
384764	2012 KK	—	January 15, 2001	Kitt Peak	Spacewatch	H	740 m	MPC · JPL
384765	2012 KO_{24}	—	June 29, 1998	Kitt Peak	Spacewatch	·	890 m	MPC · JPL
384766	2012 KE_{42}	—	October 13, 2009	Socorro	LINEAR	·	1.3 km	MPC · JPL
384767	2012 LN	—	January 13, 2011	Kitt Peak	Spacewatch	V	750 m	MPC · JPL
384768	2012 LE_{6}	—	October 17, 2006	Catalina	CSS	·	730 m	MPC · JPL
384769	2012 LT_{23}	—	December 16, 2004	Socorro	LINEAR	·	2.4 km	MPC · JPL
384770	2012 ML_{4}	—	July 30, 2008	Mount Lemmon	Mount Lemmon Survey	·	2.2 km	MPC · JPL
384771	2012 MH_{16}	—	July 12, 2005	Mount Lemmon	Mount Lemmon Survey	·	1.0 km	MPC · JPL
384772	2012 OE	—	September 28, 2008	Catalina	CSS	JUN	1.2 km	MPC · JPL
384773	2012 ON_{5}	—	January 18, 2009	Kitt Peak	Spacewatch	·	4.8 km	MPC · JPL
384774	2012 PF	—	December 2, 2010	Mount Lemmon	Mount Lemmon Survey	H	760 m	MPC · JPL
384775	2012 PV	—	November 23, 2009	Kitt Peak	Spacewatch	·	1.9 km	MPC · JPL
384776	2012 PY_{1}	—	February 25, 2006	Kitt Peak	Spacewatch	(5)	1.2 km	MPC · JPL
384777	2012 PT_{2}	—	October 20, 2008	Kitt Peak	Spacewatch	MRX	1.4 km	MPC · JPL
384778	2012 PM_{10}	—	February 2, 2006	Kitt Peak	Spacewatch	·	1.2 km	MPC · JPL
384779	2012 PP_{10}	—	September 20, 2003	Kitt Peak	Spacewatch	·	2.1 km	MPC · JPL
384780	2012 PC_{12}	—	October 14, 2007	Catalina	CSS	·	1.7 km	MPC · JPL
384781	2012 PY_{13}	—	September 23, 2008	Mount Lemmon	Mount Lemmon Survey	·	1.8 km	MPC · JPL
384782	2012 PN_{21}	—	December 22, 2003	Kitt Peak	Spacewatch	·	800 m	MPC · JPL
384783	2012 PE_{23}	—	September 18, 2003	Kitt Peak	Spacewatch	HOF	2.5 km	MPC · JPL
384784	2012 PL_{26}	—	December 6, 1996	Kitt Peak	Spacewatch	·	870 m	MPC · JPL
384785	2012 PG_{31}	—	November 28, 2005	Kitt Peak	Spacewatch	·	1.5 km	MPC · JPL
384786	2012 PB_{35}	—	September 29, 2005	Kitt Peak	Spacewatch	·	1.5 km	MPC · JPL
384787	2012 PG_{37}	—	March 15, 2007	Kitt Peak	Spacewatch	·	1.3 km	MPC · JPL
384788	2012 PH_{37}	—	November 25, 2005	Kitt Peak	Spacewatch	·	1.5 km	MPC · JPL
384789	2012 PU_{43}	—	September 21, 2007	Kitt Peak	Spacewatch	·	2.9 km	MPC · JPL
384790	2012 PY_{43}	—	September 18, 2003	Kitt Peak	Spacewatch	·	2.0 km	MPC · JPL
384791	2012 QV_{13}	—	May 26, 2006	Mount Lemmon	Mount Lemmon Survey	·	3.4 km	MPC · JPL
384792	2012 QK_{15}	—	October 8, 1993	Kitt Peak	Spacewatch	·	1.5 km	MPC · JPL
384793	2012 QD_{20}	—	February 17, 2004	Kitt Peak	Spacewatch	·	820 m	MPC · JPL
384794	2012 QD_{21}	—	November 15, 2007	Mount Lemmon	Mount Lemmon Survey	VER	3.1 km	MPC · JPL
384795	2012 QK_{24}	—	February 15, 2010	Mount Lemmon	Mount Lemmon Survey	·	2.0 km	MPC · JPL
384796	2012 QT_{25}	—	September 27, 2003	Kitt Peak	Spacewatch	·	1.8 km	MPC · JPL
384797	2012 QA_{26}	—	March 4, 2005	Mount Lemmon	Mount Lemmon Survey	·	1.7 km	MPC · JPL
384798	2012 QQ_{27}	—	September 20, 2001	Socorro	LINEAR	·	2.6 km	MPC · JPL
384799	2012 QO_{28}	—	September 12, 2007	Mount Lemmon	Mount Lemmon Survey	KOR	1.5 km	MPC · JPL
384800	2012 QV_{28}	—	February 10, 1996	Kitt Peak	Spacewatch	·	2.9 km	MPC · JPL

== 384801–384900 ==
back to top

Designation			Discovery			Properties		Ref
Permanent	Provisional	Named after	Date	Site	Discoverer(s)	Category	Diam.	Ref
384801	2012 QJ_{30}	—	October 3, 2003	Kitt Peak	Spacewatch	GEF	1.3 km	MPC · JPL
384802	2012 QN_{33}	—	March 11, 2011	Mount Lemmon	Mount Lemmon Survey	·	1.2 km	MPC · JPL
384803	2012 QT_{33}	—	March 20, 2004	Socorro	LINEAR	(2076)	940 m	MPC · JPL
384804	2012 QL_{34}	—	October 23, 2008	Kitt Peak	Spacewatch	·	1.5 km	MPC · JPL
384805	2012 QU_{34}	—	December 1, 2003	Kitt Peak	Spacewatch	·	1.9 km	MPC · JPL
384806	2012 QD_{36}	—	January 27, 2004	Kitt Peak	Spacewatch	·	3.9 km	MPC · JPL
384807	2012 QL_{36}	—	September 30, 2008	Catalina	CSS	·	1.3 km	MPC · JPL
384808	2012 QX_{36}	—	January 7, 2006	Mount Lemmon	Mount Lemmon Survey	HNS	1.6 km	MPC · JPL
384809	2012 QA_{41}	—	May 10, 2007	Mount Lemmon	Mount Lemmon Survey	EUN	1.7 km	MPC · JPL
384810	2012 QW_{41}	—	October 16, 2003	Anderson Mesa	LONEOS	DOR	2.8 km	MPC · JPL
384811	2012 QQ_{44}	—	June 20, 1998	Kitt Peak	Spacewatch	·	2.5 km	MPC · JPL
384812	2012 QN_{50}	—	November 19, 2008	Kitt Peak	Spacewatch	·	1.9 km	MPC · JPL
384813	2012 QD_{51}	—	October 14, 1999	Socorro	LINEAR	·	3.1 km	MPC · JPL
384814	2012 RX_{1}	—	August 27, 1998	Kitt Peak	Spacewatch	AGN	1.5 km	MPC · JPL
384815 Żołnowski	2012 RC_{3}	Żołnowski	November 24, 2008	Catalina	CSS	·	1.6 km	MPC · JPL
384816	2012 RW_{3}	—	March 2, 2006	Kitt Peak	Spacewatch	·	1.7 km	MPC · JPL
384817	2012 RD_{5}	—	September 18, 1995	Kitt Peak	Spacewatch	·	2.8 km	MPC · JPL
384818	2012 RE_{5}	—	August 27, 2001	Anderson Mesa	LONEOS	·	1.5 km	MPC · JPL
384819	2012 RE_{7}	—	September 25, 2007	Mount Lemmon	Mount Lemmon Survey	·	2.2 km	MPC · JPL
384820	2012 RR_{12}	—	October 30, 2008	Kitt Peak	Spacewatch	·	2.2 km	MPC · JPL
384821	2012 RT_{12}	—	February 4, 2006	Mount Lemmon	Mount Lemmon Survey	·	1.5 km	MPC · JPL
384822	2012 RJ_{13}	—	January 15, 2008	Mount Lemmon	Mount Lemmon Survey	·	3.3 km	MPC · JPL
384823	2012 RO_{18}	—	February 25, 2006	Kitt Peak	Spacewatch	·	1.8 km	MPC · JPL
384824	2012 RA_{21}	—	April 24, 2000	Kitt Peak	Spacewatch	·	3.1 km	MPC · JPL
384825	2012 RP_{22}	—	November 5, 2007	Kitt Peak	Spacewatch	THM	2.0 km	MPC · JPL
384826	2012 RM_{23}	—	September 29, 1995	Kitt Peak	Spacewatch	EOS	2.4 km	MPC · JPL
384827	2012 RV_{25}	—	December 16, 2006	Mount Lemmon	Mount Lemmon Survey	·	1.3 km	MPC · JPL
384828	2012 RQ_{26}	—	April 2, 2006	Kitt Peak	Spacewatch	·	2.0 km	MPC · JPL
384829	2012 RK_{28}	—	October 14, 2004	Anderson Mesa	LONEOS	·	1.4 km	MPC · JPL
384830	2012 RX_{28}	—	October 29, 2008	Kitt Peak	Spacewatch	·	2.1 km	MPC · JPL
384831	2012 RR_{30}	—	September 5, 2007	Catalina	CSS	·	4.4 km	MPC · JPL
384832	2012 RD_{31}	—	November 18, 2003	Kitt Peak	Spacewatch	HOF	3.2 km	MPC · JPL
384833	2012 RW_{35}	—	September 23, 2008	Kitt Peak	Spacewatch	EUN	1.5 km	MPC · JPL
384834	2012 RR_{38}	—	September 14, 2012	Mount Lemmon	Mount Lemmon Survey	·	3.3 km	MPC · JPL
384835	2012 RG_{40}	—	June 1, 2008	Mount Lemmon	Mount Lemmon Survey	MAS · fast	940 m	MPC · JPL
384836	2012 RA_{42}	—	November 20, 2003	Socorro	LINEAR	·	3.2 km	MPC · JPL
384837	2012 SA	—	October 12, 1999	Socorro	LINEAR	EUN	1.7 km	MPC · JPL
384838	2012 SG	—	March 4, 2005	Mount Lemmon	Mount Lemmon Survey	KOR	1.3 km	MPC · JPL
384839	2012 SB_{1}	—	September 9, 2004	Kitt Peak	Spacewatch	·	1.1 km	MPC · JPL
384840	2012 SD_{2}	—	August 29, 2005	Kitt Peak	Spacewatch	·	870 m	MPC · JPL
384841	2012 SN_{4}	—	February 27, 2006	Kitt Peak	Spacewatch	·	1.5 km	MPC · JPL
384842	2012 SD_{5}	—	August 29, 2006	Kitt Peak	Spacewatch	·	3.1 km	MPC · JPL
384843	2012 SG_{5}	—	August 28, 2006	Anderson Mesa	LONEOS	·	3.7 km	MPC · JPL
384844	2012 SV_{5}	—	September 3, 2007	Catalina	CSS	·	2.7 km	MPC · JPL
384845	2012 ST_{7}	—	September 25, 1995	Kitt Peak	Spacewatch	HYG	3.0 km	MPC · JPL
384846	2012 SG_{9}	—	September 20, 2003	Kitt Peak	Spacewatch	NEM	2.5 km	MPC · JPL
384847	2012 SK_{10}	—	January 10, 2007	Mount Lemmon	Mount Lemmon Survey	·	1.1 km	MPC · JPL
384848	2012 SB_{11}	—	July 19, 2007	Mount Lemmon	Mount Lemmon Survey	·	2.0 km	MPC · JPL
384849	2012 SO_{14}	—	January 15, 2010	Catalina	CSS	·	2.9 km	MPC · JPL
384850	2012 SR_{14}	—	September 18, 2007	Mount Lemmon	Mount Lemmon Survey	·	3.4 km	MPC · JPL
384851	2012 SW_{15}	—	October 1, 2003	Kitt Peak	Spacewatch	WIT	1.2 km	MPC · JPL
384852	2012 SU_{17}	—	December 22, 2003	Kitt Peak	Spacewatch	·	2.3 km	MPC · JPL
384853	2012 SA_{19}	—	March 24, 1998	Socorro	LINEAR	·	3.3 km	MPC · JPL
384854	2012 SB_{19}	—	September 25, 2007	Mount Lemmon	Mount Lemmon Survey	·	1.8 km	MPC · JPL
384855	2012 SN_{21}	—	February 14, 2010	Mount Lemmon	Mount Lemmon Survey	·	1.8 km	MPC · JPL
384856	2012 SX_{22}	—	October 20, 2008	Kitt Peak	Spacewatch	·	1.7 km	MPC · JPL
384857	2012 ST_{24}	—	September 15, 2004	Kitt Peak	Spacewatch	T_{j} (2.97) · 3:2	4.6 km	MPC · JPL
384858	2012 ST_{27}	—	October 22, 2003	Kitt Peak	Spacewatch	·	2.5 km	MPC · JPL
384859	2012 SD_{28}	—	October 25, 1995	Kitt Peak	Spacewatch	·	2.5 km	MPC · JPL
384860	2012 SN_{28}	—	January 27, 2007	Kitt Peak	Spacewatch	V	780 m	MPC · JPL
384861	2012 SP_{28}	—	October 1, 2003	Kitt Peak	Spacewatch	·	2.2 km	MPC · JPL
384862	2012 SL_{29}	—	March 17, 2004	Kitt Peak	Spacewatch	EOS	2.1 km	MPC · JPL
384863	2012 SP_{29}	—	February 9, 2005	Mount Lemmon	Mount Lemmon Survey	HOF	2.9 km	MPC · JPL
384864	2012 SR_{30}	—	October 9, 2007	Catalina	CSS	·	2.6 km	MPC · JPL
384865	2012 SR_{31}	—	November 18, 2003	Kitt Peak	Spacewatch	·	2.3 km	MPC · JPL
384866	2012 SM_{33}	—	September 5, 2008	Kitt Peak	Spacewatch	·	1.7 km	MPC · JPL
384867	2012 SE_{34}	—	October 20, 2003	Kitt Peak	Spacewatch	HOF	2.5 km	MPC · JPL
384868	2012 SO_{34}	—	October 25, 2001	Kitt Peak	Spacewatch	HYG	1.9 km	MPC · JPL
384869	2012 SY_{37}	—	September 10, 2007	Mount Lemmon	Mount Lemmon Survey	KOR	1.3 km	MPC · JPL
384870	2012 SW_{40}	—	February 9, 2007	Kitt Peak	Spacewatch	·	1.1 km	MPC · JPL
384871	2012 SA_{41}	—	January 30, 2006	Catalina	CSS	·	1.7 km	MPC · JPL
384872	2012 SN_{42}	—	October 17, 2003	Kitt Peak	Spacewatch	AGN	1.2 km	MPC · JPL
384873	2012 SP_{42}	—	October 20, 2008	Kitt Peak	Spacewatch	·	2.4 km	MPC · JPL
384874	2012 SW_{42}	—	September 19, 2003	Kitt Peak	Spacewatch	·	2.0 km	MPC · JPL
384875	2012 SE_{45}	—	October 25, 2008	Catalina	CSS	·	2.1 km	MPC · JPL
384876	2012 SO_{46}	—	February 25, 2006	Mount Lemmon	Mount Lemmon Survey	·	1.5 km	MPC · JPL
384877	2012 SH_{47}	—	October 16, 2007	Catalina	CSS	EOS	2.3 km	MPC · JPL
384878	2012 SK_{49}	—	September 20, 2001	Kitt Peak	Spacewatch	·	3.2 km	MPC · JPL
384879	2012 ST_{59}	—	October 3, 2003	Kitt Peak	Spacewatch	·	2.4 km	MPC · JPL
384880	2012 SG_{60}	—	July 28, 2008	Siding Spring	SSS	·	1.5 km	MPC · JPL
384881	2012 SL_{60}	—	October 25, 2008	Kitt Peak	Spacewatch	·	1.5 km	MPC · JPL
384882	2012 SP_{60}	—	November 7, 2008	Mount Lemmon	Mount Lemmon Survey	·	2.2 km	MPC · JPL
384883	2012 SZ_{64}	—	September 10, 2007	Kitt Peak	Spacewatch	·	2.6 km	MPC · JPL
384884	2012 SY_{65}	—	September 21, 2008	Kitt Peak	Spacewatch	·	1.9 km	MPC · JPL
384885	2012 SC_{66}	—	August 30, 2008	Socorro	LINEAR	·	1.5 km	MPC · JPL
384886	2012 TN_{3}	—	October 1, 1997	Kitt Peak	Spacewatch	EOS	2.9 km	MPC · JPL
384887	2012 TG_{6}	—	November 3, 2007	Kitt Peak	Spacewatch	·	2.3 km	MPC · JPL
384888	2012 TT_{8}	—	October 22, 2003	Kitt Peak	Spacewatch	·	2.8 km	MPC · JPL
384889	2012 TB_{9}	—	March 25, 2006	Kitt Peak	Spacewatch	·	2.0 km	MPC · JPL
384890	2012 TL_{10}	—	July 14, 1999	Socorro	LINEAR	·	2.0 km	MPC · JPL
384891	2012 TJ_{16}	—	March 13, 2005	Kitt Peak	Spacewatch	·	2.3 km	MPC · JPL
384892	2012 TE_{18}	—	October 20, 2007	Mount Lemmon	Mount Lemmon Survey	·	2.6 km	MPC · JPL
384893	2012 TQ_{18}	—	September 20, 2001	Socorro	LINEAR	·	3.0 km	MPC · JPL
384894	2012 TL_{21}	—	November 20, 2003	Kitt Peak	Spacewatch	·	2.2 km	MPC · JPL
384895	2012 TT_{26}	—	August 29, 2006	Kitt Peak	Spacewatch	·	3.0 km	MPC · JPL
384896	2012 TT_{27}	—	March 3, 1997	Kitt Peak	Spacewatch	·	2.1 km	MPC · JPL
384897	2012 TR_{28}	—	February 20, 2001	Kitt Peak	Spacewatch	·	2.2 km	MPC · JPL
384898	2012 TR_{29}	—	October 27, 2008	Mount Lemmon	Mount Lemmon Survey	·	1.7 km	MPC · JPL
384899	2012 TN_{31}	—	December 1, 2003	Kitt Peak	Spacewatch	·	2.2 km	MPC · JPL
384900	2012 TO_{31}	—	September 30, 2003	Kitt Peak	Spacewatch	·	2.7 km	MPC · JPL

== 384901–385000 ==
back to top

Designation			Discovery			Properties		Ref
Permanent	Provisional	Named after	Date	Site	Discoverer(s)	Category	Diam.	Ref
384901	2012 TV_{31}	—	October 22, 2003	Kitt Peak	Spacewatch	·	2.0 km	MPC · JPL
384902	2012 TS_{32}	—	June 27, 2004	Siding Spring	SSS	CLA	2.4 km	MPC · JPL
384903	2012 TZ_{32}	—	September 19, 1995	Kitt Peak	Spacewatch	·	1.5 km	MPC · JPL
384904	2012 TJ_{34}	—	November 9, 2004	Catalina	CSS	·	1.9 km	MPC · JPL
384905	2012 TF_{37}	—	September 27, 2008	Mount Lemmon	Mount Lemmon Survey	HOF	3.0 km	MPC · JPL
384906	2012 TL_{38}	—	February 7, 2006	Mount Lemmon	Mount Lemmon Survey	·	1.4 km	MPC · JPL
384907	2012 TO_{39}	—	September 24, 2008	Mount Lemmon	Mount Lemmon Survey	·	1.7 km	MPC · JPL
384908	2012 TV_{39}	—	October 20, 2008	Kitt Peak	Spacewatch	·	1.7 km	MPC · JPL
384909	2012 TY_{39}	—	December 29, 2008	Mount Lemmon	Mount Lemmon Survey	·	2.0 km	MPC · JPL
384910	2012 TC_{44}	—	December 19, 2004	Mount Lemmon	Mount Lemmon Survey	DOR	3.0 km	MPC · JPL
384911	2012 TM_{51}	—	October 9, 2007	Kitt Peak	Spacewatch	·	1.7 km	MPC · JPL
384912	2012 TJ_{54}	—	November 10, 2001	Socorro	LINEAR	EOS	2.4 km	MPC · JPL
384913	2012 TP_{55}	—	April 8, 2006	Kitt Peak	Spacewatch	·	2.2 km	MPC · JPL
384914	2012 TQ_{57}	—	November 21, 2008	Mount Lemmon	Mount Lemmon Survey	KOR	1.6 km	MPC · JPL
384915	2012 TU_{59}	—	March 25, 2006	Kitt Peak	Spacewatch	·	2.0 km	MPC · JPL
384916	2012 TW_{59}	—	October 13, 2007	Kitt Peak	Spacewatch	KOR	1.5 km	MPC · JPL
384917	2012 TZ_{65}	—	November 1, 2007	Catalina	CSS	EOS	2.6 km	MPC · JPL
384918	2012 TE_{66}	—	November 6, 2007	Kitt Peak	Spacewatch	·	2.3 km	MPC · JPL
384919	2012 TV_{71}	—	April 1, 2005	Kitt Peak	Spacewatch	KOR	1.9 km	MPC · JPL
384920	2012 TW_{71}	—	October 12, 2007	Mount Lemmon	Mount Lemmon Survey	·	2.8 km	MPC · JPL
384921	2012 TN_{73}	—	October 24, 2003	Kitt Peak	Spacewatch	HOF	2.8 km	MPC · JPL
384922	2012 TT_{76}	—	November 2, 2007	Kitt Peak	Spacewatch	·	2.3 km	MPC · JPL
384923	2012 TX_{82}	—	November 16, 2001	Kitt Peak	Spacewatch	NYS	1.4 km	MPC · JPL
384924	2012 TR_{84}	—	January 15, 2005	Kitt Peak	Spacewatch	·	2.9 km	MPC · JPL
384925	2012 TY_{85}	—	December 14, 2001	Socorro	LINEAR	·	3.3 km	MPC · JPL
384926	2012 TL_{87}	—	April 11, 2005	Mount Lemmon	Mount Lemmon Survey	·	2.5 km	MPC · JPL
384927	2012 TG_{88}	—	October 7, 2007	Mount Lemmon	Mount Lemmon Survey	KOR	1.5 km	MPC · JPL
384928	2012 TN_{88}	—	March 23, 2004	Kitt Peak	Spacewatch	·	3.6 km	MPC · JPL
384929	2012 TR_{89}	—	August 29, 2006	Catalina	CSS	·	3.1 km	MPC · JPL
384930	2012 TW_{89}	—	February 14, 2005	Kitt Peak	Spacewatch	AGN	1.3 km	MPC · JPL
384931	2012 TW_{90}	—	March 14, 2005	Mount Lemmon	Mount Lemmon Survey	·	2.4 km	MPC · JPL
384932	2012 TF_{91}	—	March 17, 2007	Kitt Peak	Spacewatch	·	1.4 km	MPC · JPL
384933	2012 TC_{92}	—	November 19, 2003	Kitt Peak	Spacewatch	AGN	1.5 km	MPC · JPL
384934	2012 TL_{94}	—	September 18, 2007	Kitt Peak	Spacewatch	·	1.9 km	MPC · JPL
384935	2012 TD_{98}	—	September 22, 2003	Kitt Peak	Spacewatch	·	1.9 km	MPC · JPL
384936	2012 TV_{101}	—	March 17, 2005	Mount Lemmon	Mount Lemmon Survey	AGN	1.3 km	MPC · JPL
384937	2012 TG_{102}	—	September 13, 2007	Kitt Peak	Spacewatch	·	3.6 km	MPC · JPL
384938	2012 TV_{102}	—	October 21, 2007	Kitt Peak	Spacewatch	·	2.5 km	MPC · JPL
384939	2012 TG_{106}	—	October 5, 2004	Kitt Peak	Spacewatch	3:2	4.7 km	MPC · JPL
384940	2012 TO_{106}	—	September 16, 2006	Kitt Peak	Spacewatch	·	2.7 km	MPC · JPL
384941	2012 TR_{113}	—	November 2, 2007	Kitt Peak	Spacewatch	·	3.8 km	MPC · JPL
384942	2012 TY_{118}	—	October 25, 2008	Kitt Peak	Spacewatch	·	2.0 km	MPC · JPL
384943	2012 TA_{119}	—	October 17, 2003	Kitt Peak	Spacewatch	·	2.2 km	MPC · JPL
384944	2012 TQ_{123}	—	September 11, 2004	Kitt Peak	Spacewatch	·	1.2 km	MPC · JPL
384945	2012 TA_{125}	—	April 10, 2005	Mount Lemmon	Mount Lemmon Survey	THM	2.5 km	MPC · JPL
384946	2012 TN_{126}	—	October 24, 2003	Kitt Peak	Spacewatch	·	1.8 km	MPC · JPL
384947	2012 TA_{127}	—	January 30, 2006	Kitt Peak	Spacewatch	·	1.4 km	MPC · JPL
384948	2012 TU_{127}	—	November 6, 2007	Kitt Peak	Spacewatch	·	2.8 km	MPC · JPL
384949	2012 TM_{128}	—	January 1, 2008	Mount Lemmon	Mount Lemmon Survey	·	2.9 km	MPC · JPL
384950	2012 TE_{129}	—	December 15, 2001	Socorro	LINEAR	HYG	3.4 km	MPC · JPL
384951	2012 TO_{130}	—	October 17, 2003	Kitt Peak	Spacewatch	·	2.0 km	MPC · JPL
384952	2012 TY_{130}	—	August 26, 2001	Kitt Peak	Spacewatch	·	2.9 km	MPC · JPL
384953	2012 TG_{133}	—	March 12, 2007	Mount Lemmon	Mount Lemmon Survey	·	1.3 km	MPC · JPL
384954	2012 TQ_{133}	—	November 18, 2008	Kitt Peak	Spacewatch	AGN	1.3 km	MPC · JPL
384955	2012 TZ_{134}	—	June 3, 2011	Mount Lemmon	Mount Lemmon Survey	·	1.7 km	MPC · JPL
384956	2012 TY_{136}	—	July 16, 1998	Kitt Peak	Spacewatch	·	1.8 km	MPC · JPL
384957	2012 TM_{144}	—	September 12, 2007	Anderson Mesa	LONEOS	·	2.3 km	MPC · JPL
384958	2012 TM_{146}	—	September 12, 2007	Mount Lemmon	Mount Lemmon Survey	·	1.8 km	MPC · JPL
384959	2012 TU_{148}	—	September 25, 2007	Mount Lemmon	Mount Lemmon Survey	·	2.2 km	MPC · JPL
384960	2012 TJ_{149}	—	December 18, 2001	Kitt Peak	Spacewatch	·	2.6 km	MPC · JPL
384961	2012 TA_{151}	—	January 23, 2010	WISE	WISE	·	2.8 km	MPC · JPL
384962	2012 TT_{151}	—	September 24, 2006	Kitt Peak	Spacewatch	·	3.1 km	MPC · JPL
384963	2012 TH_{153}	—	October 2, 2003	Kitt Peak	Spacewatch	·	2.6 km	MPC · JPL
384964	2012 TB_{154}	—	October 10, 2007	Kitt Peak	Spacewatch	·	1.9 km	MPC · JPL
384965	2012 TE_{154}	—	March 2, 2006	Kitt Peak	Spacewatch	·	1.4 km	MPC · JPL
384966	2012 TQ_{154}	—	October 7, 2004	Kitt Peak	Spacewatch	T_{j} (2.99) · 3:2	4.5 km	MPC · JPL
384967	2012 TF_{155}	—	March 14, 2004	Kitt Peak	Spacewatch	·	3.3 km	MPC · JPL
384968	2012 TH_{155}	—	October 30, 2007	Mount Lemmon	Mount Lemmon Survey	·	1.5 km	MPC · JPL
384969	2012 TS_{156}	—	May 4, 2006	Kitt Peak	Spacewatch	HOF	2.5 km	MPC · JPL
384970	2012 TS_{157}	—	September 11, 2007	Kitt Peak	Spacewatch	HOF	2.5 km	MPC · JPL
384971	2012 TK_{159}	—	September 13, 2007	Mount Lemmon	Mount Lemmon Survey	KOR	1.8 km	MPC · JPL
384972	2012 TN_{161}	—	October 29, 2003	Kitt Peak	Spacewatch	·	2.0 km	MPC · JPL
384973	2012 TL_{162}	—	March 14, 2004	Kitt Peak	Spacewatch	·	2.3 km	MPC · JPL
384974	2012 TE_{163}	—	March 12, 2010	Mount Lemmon	Mount Lemmon Survey	AGN	1.5 km	MPC · JPL
384975	2012 TU_{167}	—	January 19, 1996	Kitt Peak	Spacewatch	NEM	2.7 km	MPC · JPL
384976	2012 TA_{169}	—	March 14, 1999	Kitt Peak	Spacewatch	EOS	2.1 km	MPC · JPL
384977	2012 TH_{169}	—	November 28, 1994	Kitt Peak	Spacewatch	WIT	1.2 km	MPC · JPL
384978	2012 TK_{173}	—	September 13, 2007	Mount Lemmon	Mount Lemmon Survey	KOR	1.2 km	MPC · JPL
384979	2012 TZ_{173}	—	February 9, 2005	Mount Lemmon	Mount Lemmon Survey	·	2.0 km	MPC · JPL
384980	2012 TD_{174}	—	March 3, 2000	Kitt Peak	Spacewatch	·	2.0 km	MPC · JPL
384981	2012 TZ_{178}	—	December 3, 2008	Kitt Peak	Spacewatch	·	2.7 km	MPC · JPL
384982	2012 TR_{182}	—	October 22, 2003	Kitt Peak	Spacewatch	HOF	2.9 km	MPC · JPL
384983	2012 TT_{185}	—	March 2, 2009	Catalina	CSS	·	5.6 km	MPC · JPL
384984	2012 TC_{188}	—	November 18, 2007	Kitt Peak	Spacewatch	·	3.6 km	MPC · JPL
384985	2012 TE_{188}	—	May 26, 2006	Mount Lemmon	Mount Lemmon Survey	·	3.1 km	MPC · JPL
384986	2012 TM_{188}	—	April 8, 2006	Kitt Peak	Spacewatch	·	1.9 km	MPC · JPL
384987	2012 TO_{188}	—	August 29, 2006	Anderson Mesa	LONEOS	·	4.0 km	MPC · JPL
384988	2012 TU_{189}	—	August 23, 2007	Kitt Peak	Spacewatch	·	2.1 km	MPC · JPL
384989	2012 TE_{190}	—	November 20, 2001	Socorro	LINEAR	·	4.0 km	MPC · JPL
384990	2012 TH_{191}	—	January 16, 2010	WISE	WISE	·	4.1 km	MPC · JPL
384991	2012 TE_{193}	—	March 3, 2009	Catalina	CSS	(7605)	5.3 km	MPC · JPL
384992	2012 TG_{195}	—	March 15, 2004	Kitt Peak	Spacewatch	·	1.8 km	MPC · JPL
384993	2012 TS_{205}	—	October 15, 2007	Mount Lemmon	Mount Lemmon Survey	·	2.9 km	MPC · JPL
384994	2012 TO_{207}	—	October 20, 2006	Kitt Peak	Spacewatch	EOS	2.2 km	MPC · JPL
384995	2012 TK_{208}	—	December 30, 2008	Mount Lemmon	Mount Lemmon Survey	·	2.8 km	MPC · JPL
384996	2012 TW_{213}	—	January 27, 2000	Kitt Peak	Spacewatch	·	2.4 km	MPC · JPL
384997	2012 TG_{218}	—	April 1, 2003	Socorro	LINEAR	MAS	830 m	MPC · JPL
384998	2012 TJ_{219}	—	September 17, 2012	Mount Lemmon	Mount Lemmon Survey	AGN	1.2 km	MPC · JPL
384999	2012 TT_{222}	—	November 6, 2007	Kitt Peak	Spacewatch	·	1.8 km	MPC · JPL
385000	2012 TW_{227}	—	June 10, 2007	Kitt Peak	Spacewatch	·	1.3 km	MPC · JPL

back to top

== See also ==
- Meanings of minor-planet names: 384001–385000
