= Meanings of minor-planet names: 383001–384000 =

As minor planet discoveries are confirmed, they are given a permanent number by the IAU's Minor Planet Center (MPC), and the discoverers can then submit names for them, following the IAU's naming conventions. The list below concerns those minor planets in the specified number-range that have received names, and explains the meanings of those names.

Official naming citations of newly named small Solar System bodies are approved and published in a bulletin by IAU's Working Group for Small Bodies Nomenclature (WGSBN). Before May 2021, citations were published in MPC's Minor Planet Circulars for many decades. Recent citations can also be found on the JPL Small-Body Database (SBDB). Until his death in 2016, German astronomer Lutz D. Schmadel compiled these citations into the Dictionary of Minor Planet Names (DMP) and regularly updated the collection.

Based on Paul Herget's The Names of the Minor Planets, Schmadel also researched the unclear origin of numerous asteroids, most of which had been named prior to World War II. This article incorporates text from this source, which is in the public domain: SBDB New namings may only be added to this list below after official publication as the preannouncement of names is condemned. The WGSBN publishes a comprehensive guideline for the naming rules of non-cometary small Solar System bodies.

== 383001–383100 ==
Named minor planet	Provisional	This minor planet was named for...	Ref · Catalog
383067 Stoofke	2005 RA_{5}	Steven Terlaeken (born 1969), nicknamed Stoofke, created Loop naar de maan ("Run to the moon"), a fund raising event for cancer research organised by Kom op tegen Kanker - Belgium.	JPL · 383067

== 383101–383200 ==
back to top

Named minor planet	Provisional	This minor planet was named for...	Ref · Catalog
There are no named minor planets in this number range

== 383201–383300 ==
back to top

Named minor planet	Provisional	This minor planet was named for...	Ref · Catalog
There are no named minor planets in this number range

== 383301–383400 ==
back to top

Named minor planet	Provisional	This minor planet was named for...	Ref · Catalog
There are no named minor planets in this number range

== 383401–383500 ==
back to top

Named minor planet	Provisional	This minor planet was named for...	Ref · Catalog
383417 DAO	2006 UY_{216}	The Dominion Astrophysical Observatory (DAO) of the National Research Council of Canada.	JPL · 383417
383492 Aubert	2007 BK_{50}	Pascal Aubert (born 1966), a French amateur astronomer and observer of solar eclipses all over the world. He has also participated in humanitarian education activities in Madagascar.	JPL · 383492

== 383501–383600 ==
back to top

Named minor planet	Provisional	This minor planet was named for...	Ref · Catalog
383508 Vadrot	2007 CV_{18}	Laurent Vadrot (born 1975) is secretary-general of the Association Française des Observateurs d´Etoiles Variables. He is heavily involved in the protection of the night sky and in the development of an astronomy station in the Morvan Regional Nature Park (Burgundy).	JPL · 383508

== 383601–383700 ==
back to top

Named minor planet	Provisional	This minor planet was named for...	Ref · Catalog
383622 Luigivolta	2007 PJ_{9}	Luigi Volta (1876–1952), an Italian astronomer and a discoverer of minor planets at the Observatory of Turin during 1928–1934.	IAU · 383622

== 383701–383800 ==
back to top

Named minor planet	Provisional	This minor planet was named for...	Ref · Catalog
There are no named minor planets in this number range

== 383801–383900 ==
back to top

Named minor planet	Provisional	This minor planet was named for...	Ref · Catalog
There are no named minor planets in this number range

== 383901–384000 ==
back to top

Named minor planet	Provisional	This minor planet was named for...	Ref · Catalog
There are no named minor planets in this number range

back to top

Preceded by 382,001–383,000	Meanings of minor-planet names List of minor planets: 383,001–384,000	Succeeded by 384,001–385,000
