= List of minor planets: 383001–384000 =

The following is a partial list of minor planets, running from minor-planet number 383001 through 384000, inclusive. The primary data for this and other partial lists is based on JPL's "Small-Body Orbital Elements" and data available from the Minor Planet Center. Critical list information is also provided by the MPC, unless otherwise specified from Lowell Observatory. A detailed description of the table's columns and additional sources are given on the main page including a complete list of every page in this series, and a statistical break-up on the dynamical classification of minor planets.

Also see the summary list of all named bodies in numerical and alphabetical order, and the corresponding naming citations for the number range of this particular list. New namings may only be added to this list after official publication, as the preannouncement of names is condemned by the Working Group for Small Bodies Nomenclature of the International Astronomical Union.

Near-Earth obj.	MBA (inner)	MBA (outer)	Centaur
Mars-crosser	MBA (middle)	Jupiter trojan	Trans-Neptunian obj.
Unclassified

== 383001–383100 ==
Designation			Discovery			Properties		Ref
Permanent	Provisional	Named after	Date	Site	Discoverer(s)	Category	Diam.	Ref
383001	2005 JO_{133}	—	May 14, 2005	Kitt Peak	Spacewatch	EOS	2.6 km	MPC · JPL
383002	2005 JW_{137}	—	May 13, 2005	Kitt Peak	Spacewatch	·	4.1 km	MPC · JPL
383003	2005 JW_{149}	—	May 3, 2005	Kitt Peak	Spacewatch	ELF	4.3 km	MPC · JPL
383004	2005 LA_{9}	—	June 1, 2005	Mount Lemmon	Mount Lemmon Survey	·	2.9 km	MPC · JPL
383005	2005 LR_{10}	—	June 3, 2005	Catalina	CSS	·	1.0 km	MPC · JPL
383006	2005 LE_{19}	—	June 8, 2005	Kitt Peak	Spacewatch	·	1.3 km	MPC · JPL
383007	2005 LT_{38}	—	June 11, 2005	Kitt Peak	Spacewatch	·	3.1 km	MPC · JPL
383008	2005 LU_{47}	—	June 14, 2005	Mount Lemmon	Mount Lemmon Survey	NYS	1.1 km	MPC · JPL
383009	2005 ML_{11}	—	June 27, 2005	Kitt Peak	Spacewatch	·	3.0 km	MPC · JPL
383010	2005 MY_{12}	—	June 29, 2005	Catalina	CSS	PHO	1.8 km	MPC · JPL
383011	2005 MS_{17}	—	June 27, 2005	Kitt Peak	Spacewatch	·	1.3 km	MPC · JPL
383012	2005 MF_{27}	—	June 29, 2005	Kitt Peak	Spacewatch	·	950 m	MPC · JPL
383013	2005 MS_{30}	—	June 29, 2005	Palomar	NEAT	·	1.4 km	MPC · JPL
383014	2005 ML_{31}	—	June 30, 2005	Palomar	NEAT	·	2.4 km	MPC · JPL
383015	2005 MS_{35}	—	June 30, 2005	Kitt Peak	Spacewatch	·	3.9 km	MPC · JPL
383016	2005 ME_{39}	—	June 28, 2005	Palomar	NEAT	·	1.8 km	MPC · JPL
383017	2005 MW_{42}	—	June 29, 2005	Palomar	NEAT	NYS	1.3 km	MPC · JPL
383018	2005 MD_{43}	—	June 30, 2005	Kitt Peak	Spacewatch	V	820 m	MPC · JPL
383019	2005 NR_{9}	—	July 1, 2005	Kitt Peak	Spacewatch	TIR	3.1 km	MPC · JPL
383020	2005 NW_{14}	—	July 2, 2005	Kitt Peak	Spacewatch	MAS	760 m	MPC · JPL
383021	2005 NY_{17}	—	July 4, 2005	Socorro	LINEAR	·	1.6 km	MPC · JPL
383022	2005 NC_{20}	—	June 16, 2005	Kitt Peak	Spacewatch	·	1.2 km	MPC · JPL
383023	2005 NJ_{43}	—	July 5, 2005	Palomar	NEAT	·	1.2 km	MPC · JPL
383024	2005 NQ_{50}	—	July 5, 2005	Mount Lemmon	Mount Lemmon Survey	·	980 m	MPC · JPL
383025	2005 ND_{55}	—	July 10, 2005	Kitt Peak	Spacewatch	·	2.1 km	MPC · JPL
383026	2005 NV_{61}	—	July 11, 2005	Kitt Peak	Spacewatch	·	1.2 km	MPC · JPL
383027	2005 NQ_{74}	—	July 9, 2005	Kitt Peak	Spacewatch	·	1.0 km	MPC · JPL
383028	2005 NK_{76}	—	July 10, 2005	Kitt Peak	Spacewatch	·	1.3 km	MPC · JPL
383029	2005 NM_{98}	—	July 9, 2005	Kitt Peak	Spacewatch	TIR	3.0 km	MPC · JPL
383030	2005 NL_{123}	—	July 9, 2005	Kitt Peak	Spacewatch	NYS	1.1 km	MPC · JPL
383031	2005 NS_{125}	—	July 4, 2005	Siding Spring	SSS	PHO	1.0 km	MPC · JPL
383032	2005 OK_{20}	—	July 28, 2005	Palomar	NEAT	MAS	740 m	MPC · JPL
383033	2005 OX_{31}	—	July 26, 2005	Palomar	NEAT	·	1.1 km	MPC · JPL
383034	2005 PH_{24}	—	August 10, 2005	Cerro Tololo	M. W. Buie	MAS	830 m	MPC · JPL
383035	2005 QV_{2}	—	August 24, 2005	Palomar	NEAT	·	1.4 km	MPC · JPL
383036	2005 QN_{3}	—	August 24, 2005	Palomar	NEAT	·	1.3 km	MPC · JPL
383037	2005 QC_{8}	—	August 24, 2005	Palomar	NEAT	MAS	730 m	MPC · JPL
383038	2005 QX_{12}	—	August 24, 2005	Palomar	NEAT	·	1.2 km	MPC · JPL
383039	2005 QJ_{18}	—	August 25, 2005	Palomar	NEAT	MAS	820 m	MPC · JPL
383040	2005 QW_{19}	—	August 26, 2005	Campo Imperatore	CINEOS	NYS	1.3 km	MPC · JPL
383041	2005 QQ_{32}	—	August 25, 2005	Palomar	NEAT	·	5.8 km	MPC · JPL
383042	2005 QZ_{39}	—	August 26, 2005	Palomar	NEAT	·	1.3 km	MPC · JPL
383043	2005 QA_{49}	—	August 26, 2005	Palomar	NEAT	NYS	1.1 km	MPC · JPL
383044	2005 QY_{51}	—	August 27, 2005	Anderson Mesa	LONEOS	·	1.5 km	MPC · JPL
383045	2005 QK_{55}	—	August 28, 2005	Kitt Peak	Spacewatch	NYS	1.1 km	MPC · JPL
383046	2005 QT_{57}	—	August 24, 2005	Palomar	NEAT	V	880 m	MPC · JPL
383047	2005 QA_{60}	—	August 25, 2005	Palomar	NEAT	MAS	820 m	MPC · JPL
383048	2005 QL_{62}	—	August 26, 2005	Palomar	NEAT	V	570 m	MPC · JPL
383049	2005 QA_{65}	—	August 26, 2005	Palomar	NEAT	·	1.3 km	MPC · JPL
383050	2005 QO_{66}	—	August 27, 2005	Anderson Mesa	LONEOS	NYS	1.3 km	MPC · JPL
383051	2005 QJ_{69}	—	August 28, 2005	Siding Spring	SSS	·	3.1 km	MPC · JPL
383052	2005 QA_{90}	—	August 24, 2005	Palomar	NEAT	MAS	820 m	MPC · JPL
383053	2005 QU_{100}	—	August 27, 2005	Palomar	NEAT	·	1.1 km	MPC · JPL
383054	2005 QW_{105}	—	August 27, 2005	Palomar	NEAT	MAS	760 m	MPC · JPL
383055	2005 QU_{125}	—	August 28, 2005	Kitt Peak	Spacewatch	·	3.6 km	MPC · JPL
383056	2005 QH_{129}	—	August 28, 2005	Kitt Peak	Spacewatch	V	750 m	MPC · JPL
383057	2005 QV_{137}	—	August 28, 2005	Kitt Peak	Spacewatch	NYS	1.1 km	MPC · JPL
383058	2005 QC_{140}	—	August 28, 2005	Kitt Peak	Spacewatch	·	1.0 km	MPC · JPL
383059	2005 QY_{145}	—	August 27, 2005	Palomar	NEAT	·	1.6 km	MPC · JPL
383060	2005 QV_{146}	—	August 28, 2005	Siding Spring	SSS	NYS	1.4 km	MPC · JPL
383061	2005 QA_{158}	—	August 26, 2005	Palomar	NEAT	·	1.5 km	MPC · JPL
383062	2005 QD_{161}	—	August 28, 2005	Kitt Peak	Spacewatch	NYS	1.2 km	MPC · JPL
383063	2005 QO_{172}	—	August 29, 2005	Palomar	NEAT	·	2.4 km	MPC · JPL
383064	2005 QG_{178}	—	August 25, 2005	Palomar	NEAT	·	1.1 km	MPC · JPL
383065	2005 QJ_{181}	—	August 30, 2005	Kitt Peak	Spacewatch	·	1.4 km	MPC · JPL
383066	2005 QF_{183}	—	August 31, 2005	Kitt Peak	Spacewatch	NYS	1.2 km	MPC · JPL
383067 Stoofke	2005 RA_{5}	Stoofke	September 7, 2005	Uccle	T. Pauwels	·	1.5 km	MPC · JPL
383068	2005 RX_{9}	—	September 10, 2005	Goodricke-Pigott	R. A. Tucker	·	1.4 km	MPC · JPL
383069	2005 RH_{10}	—	September 8, 2005	Socorro	LINEAR	V	700 m	MPC · JPL
383070	2005 RE_{30}	—	September 9, 2005	Socorro	LINEAR	·	1.3 km	MPC · JPL
383071	2005 RQ_{40}	—	September 11, 2005	Socorro	LINEAR	·	1.4 km	MPC · JPL
383072	2005 RQ_{41}	—	September 13, 2005	Kitt Peak	Spacewatch	·	1.1 km	MPC · JPL
383073	2005 RJ_{44}	—	September 3, 2005	Palomar	NEAT	·	1.7 km	MPC · JPL
383074	2005 SP_{2}	—	September 23, 2005	Catalina	CSS	·	2.2 km	MPC · JPL
383075	2005 SY_{5}	—	September 23, 2005	Catalina	CSS	NYS	1.3 km	MPC · JPL
383076	2005 SE_{29}	—	September 23, 2005	Kitt Peak	Spacewatch	·	1.4 km	MPC · JPL
383077	2005 SD_{41}	—	September 24, 2005	Kitt Peak	Spacewatch	·	1.3 km	MPC · JPL
383078	2005 SO_{49}	—	September 24, 2005	Kitt Peak	Spacewatch	·	1.2 km	MPC · JPL
383079	2005 SR_{53}	—	September 25, 2005	Kitt Peak	Spacewatch	·	1.5 km	MPC · JPL
383080	2005 ST_{65}	—	September 26, 2005	Palomar	NEAT	·	2.3 km	MPC · JPL
383081	2005 SY_{68}	—	September 27, 2005	Kitt Peak	Spacewatch	·	1.3 km	MPC · JPL
383082	2005 SM_{71}	—	September 23, 2005	Catalina	CSS	·	1.3 km	MPC · JPL
383083	2005 SP_{79}	—	September 24, 2005	Kitt Peak	Spacewatch	MAS	650 m	MPC · JPL
383084	2005 SH_{80}	—	September 24, 2005	Kitt Peak	Spacewatch	MAS	700 m	MPC · JPL
383085	2005 SP_{82}	—	September 24, 2005	Kitt Peak	Spacewatch	MAS	720 m	MPC · JPL
383086	2005 SQ_{82}	—	September 24, 2005	Kitt Peak	Spacewatch	·	1.2 km	MPC · JPL
383087	2005 SV_{86}	—	September 24, 2005	Kitt Peak	Spacewatch	CLA	1.6 km	MPC · JPL
383088	2005 SG_{88}	—	September 24, 2005	Kitt Peak	Spacewatch	·	1.2 km	MPC · JPL
383089	2005 SU_{88}	—	September 24, 2005	Kitt Peak	Spacewatch	·	1.3 km	MPC · JPL
383090	2005 SJ_{90}	—	September 24, 2005	Kitt Peak	Spacewatch	NYS	1.1 km	MPC · JPL
383091	2005 SW_{92}	—	September 24, 2005	Kitt Peak	Spacewatch	·	1.4 km	MPC · JPL
383092	2005 ST_{101}	—	September 25, 2005	Kitt Peak	Spacewatch	·	1.3 km	MPC · JPL
383093	2005 SZ_{101}	—	September 25, 2005	Kitt Peak	Spacewatch	·	1.5 km	MPC · JPL
383094	2005 SS_{107}	—	September 26, 2005	Catalina	CSS	·	2.2 km	MPC · JPL
383095	2005 SA_{109}	—	September 26, 2005	Kitt Peak	Spacewatch	·	1.4 km	MPC · JPL
383096	2005 SY_{117}	—	September 28, 2005	Palomar	NEAT	·	1.5 km	MPC · JPL
383097	2005 SS_{136}	—	September 24, 2005	Kitt Peak	Spacewatch	·	1.5 km	MPC · JPL
383098	2005 SC_{138}	—	September 25, 2005	Palomar	NEAT	·	2.5 km	MPC · JPL
383099	2005 SX_{145}	—	September 25, 2005	Kitt Peak	Spacewatch	MAS	720 m	MPC · JPL
383100	2005 SY_{150}	—	September 25, 2005	Kitt Peak	Spacewatch	V	640 m	MPC · JPL

== 383101–383200 ==
back to top

Designation			Discovery			Properties		Ref
Permanent	Provisional	Named after	Date	Site	Discoverer(s)	Category	Diam.	Ref
383101	2005 SQ_{154}	—	September 26, 2005	Kitt Peak	Spacewatch	·	1.1 km	MPC · JPL
383102	2005 SJ_{165}	—	September 28, 2005	Palomar	NEAT	·	1.2 km	MPC · JPL
383103	2005 SC_{170}	—	September 29, 2005	Anderson Mesa	LONEOS	·	1.7 km	MPC · JPL
383104	2005 SA_{187}	—	September 29, 2005	Kitt Peak	Spacewatch	·	1.4 km	MPC · JPL
383105	2005 SY_{188}	—	September 29, 2005	Mount Lemmon	Mount Lemmon Survey	MAS	590 m	MPC · JPL
383106	2005 SG_{190}	—	September 29, 2005	Anderson Mesa	LONEOS	·	1.3 km	MPC · JPL
383107	2005 SO_{192}	—	September 29, 2005	Mount Lemmon	Mount Lemmon Survey	·	1.3 km	MPC · JPL
383108	2005 SE_{200}	—	September 30, 2005	Kitt Peak	Spacewatch	·	1.3 km	MPC · JPL
383109	2005 SO_{203}	—	September 30, 2005	Anderson Mesa	LONEOS	NYS	1.2 km	MPC · JPL
383110	2005 SN_{221}	—	September 30, 2005	Mount Lemmon	Mount Lemmon Survey	MAS	800 m	MPC · JPL
383111	2005 SW_{224}	—	September 29, 2005	Kitt Peak	Spacewatch	MAS	870 m	MPC · JPL
383112	2005 SS_{231}	—	September 30, 2005	Mount Lemmon	Mount Lemmon Survey	·	890 m	MPC · JPL
383113	2005 SX_{239}	—	September 30, 2005	Kitt Peak	Spacewatch	·	1.5 km	MPC · JPL
383114	2005 SB_{251}	—	September 24, 2005	Palomar	NEAT	·	1.2 km	MPC · JPL
383115	2005 SW_{256}	—	September 22, 2005	Palomar	NEAT	·	1.5 km	MPC · JPL
383116	2005 SR_{258}	—	September 23, 2005	Anderson Mesa	LONEOS	·	1.4 km	MPC · JPL
383117	2005 SG_{260}	—	September 22, 2005	Palomar	NEAT	·	1.3 km	MPC · JPL
383118	2005 SE_{279}	—	September 29, 2005	Mount Lemmon	Mount Lemmon Survey	·	880 m	MPC · JPL
383119	2005 SR_{279}	—	September 23, 2005	Kitt Peak	Spacewatch	·	1.1 km	MPC · JPL
383120	2005 SF_{292}	—	September 29, 2005	Kitt Peak	Spacewatch	·	960 m	MPC · JPL
383121	2005 TP_{11}	—	October 1, 2005	Mount Lemmon	Mount Lemmon Survey	·	1.7 km	MPC · JPL
383122	2005 TU_{23}	—	October 1, 2005	Catalina	CSS	NYS	1.3 km	MPC · JPL
383123	2005 TW_{23}	—	September 10, 2005	Anderson Mesa	LONEOS	V	790 m	MPC · JPL
383124	2005 TA_{44}	—	October 5, 2005	Mount Lemmon	Mount Lemmon Survey	NYS	1.3 km	MPC · JPL
383125	2005 TE_{71}	—	October 6, 2005	Mount Lemmon	Mount Lemmon Survey	MAS	700 m	MPC · JPL
383126	2005 TV_{74}	—	October 1, 2005	Catalina	CSS	V	910 m	MPC · JPL
383127	2005 TH_{127}	—	October 7, 2005	Kitt Peak	Spacewatch	·	1.1 km	MPC · JPL
383128	2005 TP_{131}	—	October 7, 2005	Kitt Peak	Spacewatch	·	1.5 km	MPC · JPL
383129	2005 TZ_{154}	—	October 9, 2005	Kitt Peak	Spacewatch	·	1.4 km	MPC · JPL
383130	2005 TE_{179}	—	October 5, 2005	Mount Lemmon	Mount Lemmon Survey	·	1.0 km	MPC · JPL
383131	2005 UX	—	October 20, 2005	Junk Bond	D. Healy	·	1.3 km	MPC · JPL
383132	2005 UY_{9}	—	October 21, 2005	Palomar	NEAT	·	1.7 km	MPC · JPL
383133	2005 US_{27}	—	October 23, 2005	Catalina	CSS	·	1.3 km	MPC · JPL
383134	2005 UT_{31}	—	October 24, 2005	Kitt Peak	Spacewatch	·	1.0 km	MPC · JPL
383135	2005 UJ_{44}	—	October 22, 2005	Kitt Peak	Spacewatch	MAS	750 m	MPC · JPL
383136	2005 US_{52}	—	October 23, 2005	Catalina	CSS	PHO	1.0 km	MPC · JPL
383137	2005 UL_{55}	—	October 23, 2005	Catalina	CSS	(5)	950 m	MPC · JPL
383138	2005 UT_{92}	—	October 22, 2005	Kitt Peak	Spacewatch	PHO	2.8 km	MPC · JPL
383139	2005 UF_{96}	—	October 22, 2005	Kitt Peak	Spacewatch	MAS	860 m	MPC · JPL
383140	2005 UN_{103}	—	October 22, 2005	Kitt Peak	Spacewatch	·	1.1 km	MPC · JPL
383141	2005 UQ_{103}	—	October 22, 2005	Kitt Peak	Spacewatch	NYS	1.2 km	MPC · JPL
383142	2005 UC_{162}	—	October 27, 2005	Socorro	LINEAR	·	1.3 km	MPC · JPL
383143	2005 UB_{178}	—	October 24, 2005	Kitt Peak	Spacewatch	V	730 m	MPC · JPL
383144	2005 UB_{187}	—	October 26, 2005	Kitt Peak	Spacewatch	MAS	710 m	MPC · JPL
383145	2005 UC_{218}	—	October 24, 2005	Kitt Peak	Spacewatch	·	1.6 km	MPC · JPL
383146	2005 UH_{230}	—	October 25, 2005	Kitt Peak	Spacewatch	·	1.2 km	MPC · JPL
383147	2005 UX_{234}	—	October 25, 2005	Kitt Peak	Spacewatch	·	1.3 km	MPC · JPL
383148	2005 UZ_{265}	—	October 27, 2005	Kitt Peak	Spacewatch	·	1.2 km	MPC · JPL
383149	2005 UL_{267}	—	October 27, 2005	Kitt Peak	Spacewatch	·	1.2 km	MPC · JPL
383150	2005 UT_{285}	—	October 26, 2005	Kitt Peak	Spacewatch	·	1.2 km	MPC · JPL
383151	2005 UV_{311}	—	October 29, 2005	Mount Lemmon	Mount Lemmon Survey	MAS	810 m	MPC · JPL
383152	2005 UD_{316}	—	October 25, 2005	Mount Lemmon	Mount Lemmon Survey	PHO	1.2 km	MPC · JPL
383153	2005 UH_{321}	—	October 27, 2005	Kitt Peak	Spacewatch	NYS	1.1 km	MPC · JPL
383154	2005 UL_{323}	—	October 28, 2005	Catalina	CSS	·	1.1 km	MPC · JPL
383155	2005 UE_{334}	—	October 29, 2005	Mount Lemmon	Mount Lemmon Survey	NYS	1.2 km	MPC · JPL
383156	2005 UE_{343}	—	October 31, 2005	Palomar	NEAT	·	1.5 km	MPC · JPL
383157	2005 UX_{386}	—	October 22, 2005	Kitt Peak	Spacewatch	NYS	1.1 km	MPC · JPL
383158	2005 US_{388}	—	October 27, 2005	Kitt Peak	Spacewatch	NYS	1.3 km	MPC · JPL
383159	2005 UW_{434}	—	October 29, 2005	Mount Lemmon	Mount Lemmon Survey	·	2.4 km	MPC · JPL
383160	2005 UB_{436}	—	October 30, 2005	Kitt Peak	Spacewatch	·	1.1 km	MPC · JPL
383161	2005 UP_{440}	—	October 29, 2005	Catalina	CSS	·	1.2 km	MPC · JPL
383162	2005 UY_{472}	—	October 30, 2005	Mount Lemmon	Mount Lemmon Survey	·	1.6 km	MPC · JPL
383163	2005 UJ_{477}	—	October 26, 2005	Kitt Peak	Spacewatch	·	1.1 km	MPC · JPL
383164	2005 UD_{486}	—	October 23, 2005	Palomar	NEAT	·	1.1 km	MPC · JPL
383165	2005 VJ_{5}	—	November 7, 2005	Mauna Kea	D. J. Tholen	·	620 m	MPC · JPL
383166	2005 VC_{7}	—	November 12, 2005	Socorro	LINEAR	H	730 m	MPC · JPL
383167	2005 VD_{49}	—	November 1, 2005	Kitt Peak	Spacewatch	·	860 m	MPC · JPL
383168	2005 VL_{71}	—	November 1, 2005	Mount Lemmon	Mount Lemmon Survey	·	1.4 km	MPC · JPL
383169	2005 VZ_{73}	—	November 1, 2005	Mount Lemmon	Mount Lemmon Survey	·	1.2 km	MPC · JPL
383170	2005 VG_{81}	—	November 5, 2005	Kitt Peak	Spacewatch	NYS	960 m	MPC · JPL
383171	2005 VT_{98}	—	November 10, 2005	Catalina	CSS	H	610 m	MPC · JPL
383172	2005 VF_{108}	—	November 6, 2005	Kitt Peak	Spacewatch	·	860 m	MPC · JPL
383173	2005 VW_{118}	—	November 10, 2005	Catalina	CSS	·	2.1 km	MPC · JPL
383174	2005 VR_{124}	—	November 2, 2005	Socorro	LINEAR	·	1.3 km	MPC · JPL
383175	2005 VM_{129}	—	November 1, 2005	Apache Point	A. C. Becker	NYS	900 m	MPC · JPL
383176	2005 WY_{22}	—	November 21, 2005	Kitt Peak	Spacewatch	·	1.3 km	MPC · JPL
383177	2005 WU_{42}	—	November 21, 2005	Kitt Peak	Spacewatch	·	2.1 km	MPC · JPL
383178	2005 WN_{56}	—	November 25, 2005	Catalina	CSS	H	710 m	MPC · JPL
383179	2005 WM_{77}	—	November 25, 2005	Kitt Peak	Spacewatch	3:2	4.1 km	MPC · JPL
383180	2005 WP_{119}	—	November 28, 2005	Catalina	CSS	MAS	800 m	MPC · JPL
383181	2005 WM_{149}	—	November 28, 2005	Kitt Peak	Spacewatch	·	1.4 km	MPC · JPL
383182	2005 WF_{160}	—	November 30, 2005	Catalina	CSS	·	1.9 km	MPC · JPL
383183	2005 WE_{177}	—	November 30, 2005	Kitt Peak	Spacewatch	(5)	940 m	MPC · JPL
383184	2005 WA_{183}	—	November 28, 2005	Palomar	NEAT	H	650 m	MPC · JPL
383185	2005 WZ_{187}	—	November 30, 2005	Socorro	LINEAR	NYS	1.3 km	MPC · JPL
383186	2005 WS_{193}	—	November 28, 2005	Palomar	NEAT	H	650 m	MPC · JPL
383187	2005 XV_{8}	—	December 1, 2005	Kitt Peak	Spacewatch	·	1.6 km	MPC · JPL
383188	2005 XS_{42}	—	November 6, 2005	Mount Lemmon	Mount Lemmon Survey	·	1.3 km	MPC · JPL
383189	2005 XT_{57}	—	November 1, 2005	Mount Lemmon	Mount Lemmon Survey	·	1.6 km	MPC · JPL
383190	2005 XN_{66}	—	December 8, 2005	Socorro	LINEAR	H	660 m	MPC · JPL
383191	2005 XG_{111}	—	December 1, 2005	Kitt Peak	M. W. Buie	·	1.9 km	MPC · JPL
383192	2005 XJ_{117}	—	December 7, 2005	Catalina	CSS	H	720 m	MPC · JPL
383193	2005 YJ_{15}	—	December 22, 2005	Kitt Peak	Spacewatch	·	1.4 km	MPC · JPL
383194	2005 YB_{25}	—	December 24, 2005	Kitt Peak	Spacewatch	·	1.2 km	MPC · JPL
383195	2005 YS_{27}	—	December 22, 2005	Kitt Peak	Spacewatch	·	1.1 km	MPC · JPL
383196	2005 YG_{29}	—	December 24, 2005	Kitt Peak	Spacewatch	·	1.6 km	MPC · JPL
383197	2005 YL_{29}	—	December 24, 2005	Kitt Peak	Spacewatch	·	1.1 km	MPC · JPL
383198	2005 YV_{29}	—	December 25, 2005	Kitt Peak	Spacewatch	·	1.1 km	MPC · JPL
383199	2005 YO_{31}	—	December 22, 2005	Kitt Peak	Spacewatch	·	1.3 km	MPC · JPL
383200	2005 YN_{32}	—	December 22, 2005	Kitt Peak	Spacewatch	·	810 m	MPC · JPL

== 383201–383300 ==
back to top

Designation			Discovery			Properties		Ref
Permanent	Provisional	Named after	Date	Site	Discoverer(s)	Category	Diam.	Ref
383201	2005 YX_{36}	—	December 24, 2005	Catalina	CSS	BAR	1.4 km	MPC · JPL
383202	2005 YV_{44}	—	December 25, 2005	Kitt Peak	Spacewatch	·	2.0 km	MPC · JPL
383203	2005 YQ_{47}	—	December 26, 2005	Kitt Peak	Spacewatch	H	810 m	MPC · JPL
383204	2005 YB_{57}	—	December 8, 2005	Kitt Peak	Spacewatch	·	1.1 km	MPC · JPL
383205	2005 YS_{57}	—	November 10, 2005	Mount Lemmon	Mount Lemmon Survey	T_{j} (2.98) · 3:2	4.3 km	MPC · JPL
383206	2005 YZ_{87}	—	December 25, 2005	Mount Lemmon	Mount Lemmon Survey	·	1.3 km	MPC · JPL
383207	2005 YH_{90}	—	December 26, 2005	Mount Lemmon	Mount Lemmon Survey	·	2.7 km	MPC · JPL
383208	2005 YG_{100}	—	December 28, 2005	Kitt Peak	Spacewatch	(5)	1.1 km	MPC · JPL
383209	2005 YR_{106}	—	December 25, 2005	Kitt Peak	Spacewatch	·	2.0 km	MPC · JPL
383210	2005 YS_{106}	—	December 25, 2005	Kitt Peak	Spacewatch	·	1.5 km	MPC · JPL
383211	2005 YV_{119}	—	December 27, 2005	Mount Lemmon	Mount Lemmon Survey	EUN	1.1 km	MPC · JPL
383212	2005 YV_{143}	—	December 28, 2005	Mount Lemmon	Mount Lemmon Survey	·	760 m	MPC · JPL
383213	2005 YP_{144}	—	December 28, 2005	Mount Lemmon	Mount Lemmon Survey	EUN	1.4 km	MPC · JPL
383214	2005 YD_{149}	—	December 25, 2005	Kitt Peak	Spacewatch	·	1.3 km	MPC · JPL
383215	2005 YY_{167}	—	December 28, 2005	Catalina	CSS	·	1.7 km	MPC · JPL
383216	2005 YA_{200}	—	December 26, 2005	Mount Lemmon	Mount Lemmon Survey	EUN	1.3 km	MPC · JPL
383217	2005 YQ_{206}	—	December 27, 2005	Kitt Peak	Spacewatch	H	630 m	MPC · JPL
383218	2005 YX_{220}	—	December 30, 2005	Socorro	LINEAR	·	2.9 km	MPC · JPL
383219	2005 YD_{287}	—	December 29, 2005	Mount Lemmon	Mount Lemmon Survey	MAS	880 m	MPC · JPL
383220	2005 YQ_{290}	—	December 30, 2005	Kitt Peak	Spacewatch	·	2.3 km	MPC · JPL
383221	2006 AY_{4}	—	January 2, 2006	Catalina	CSS	·	2.7 km	MPC · JPL
383222	2006 AA_{50}	—	January 5, 2006	Kitt Peak	Spacewatch	·	3.1 km	MPC · JPL
383223	2006 AW_{55}	—	January 6, 2006	Mount Lemmon	Mount Lemmon Survey	(5)	1.5 km	MPC · JPL
383224	2006 AR_{74}	—	January 7, 2006	Anderson Mesa	LONEOS	·	1.8 km	MPC · JPL
383225	2006 AM_{79}	—	January 4, 2006	Catalina	CSS	H	660 m	MPC · JPL
383226	2006 AJ_{84}	—	January 6, 2006	Catalina	CSS	·	1.5 km	MPC · JPL
383227	2006 AJ_{85}	—	January 7, 2006	Catalina	CSS	·	1.4 km	MPC · JPL
383228	2006 AQ_{100}	—	January 5, 2006	Mount Lemmon	Mount Lemmon Survey	·	1.2 km	MPC · JPL
383229	2006 BG_{3}	—	January 21, 2006	Kitt Peak	Spacewatch	·	1.2 km	MPC · JPL
383230	2006 BJ_{23}	—	January 23, 2006	Kitt Peak	Spacewatch	·	2.4 km	MPC · JPL
383231	2006 BL_{27}	—	January 22, 2006	Anderson Mesa	LONEOS	·	1.9 km	MPC · JPL
383232	2006 BR_{35}	—	January 23, 2006	Kitt Peak	Spacewatch	·	1.2 km	MPC · JPL
383233	2006 BD_{37}	—	January 23, 2006	Mount Lemmon	Mount Lemmon Survey	·	820 m	MPC · JPL
383234	2006 BR_{39}	—	January 19, 2006	Catalina	CSS	HNS	1.6 km	MPC · JPL
383235	2006 BC_{40}	—	January 20, 2006	Kitt Peak	Spacewatch	(5)	1.7 km	MPC · JPL
383236	2006 BW_{41}	—	January 22, 2006	Mount Lemmon	Mount Lemmon Survey	·	1.5 km	MPC · JPL
383237	2006 BW_{71}	—	January 23, 2006	Kitt Peak	Spacewatch	(5)	1.3 km	MPC · JPL
383238	2006 BY_{110}	—	January 25, 2006	Kitt Peak	Spacewatch	·	1.1 km	MPC · JPL
383239	2006 BB_{123}	—	January 26, 2006	Kitt Peak	Spacewatch	·	1.5 km	MPC · JPL
383240	2006 BU_{129}	—	January 26, 2006	Mount Lemmon	Mount Lemmon Survey	·	1.1 km	MPC · JPL
383241	2006 BV_{135}	—	January 27, 2006	Mount Lemmon	Mount Lemmon Survey	·	950 m	MPC · JPL
383242	2006 BY_{143}	—	January 22, 2006	Anderson Mesa	LONEOS	(5)	1.2 km	MPC · JPL
383243	2006 BM_{154}	—	January 25, 2006	Kitt Peak	Spacewatch	·	1.9 km	MPC · JPL
383244	2006 BP_{216}	—	January 26, 2006	Catalina	CSS	·	1.5 km	MPC · JPL
383245	2006 BF_{219}	—	January 28, 2006	Anderson Mesa	LONEOS	(5)	1.1 km	MPC · JPL
383246	2006 BO_{228}	—	January 31, 2006	Kitt Peak	Spacewatch	(5)	1.9 km	MPC · JPL
383247	2006 BG_{234}	—	January 31, 2006	Kitt Peak	Spacewatch	·	1.1 km	MPC · JPL
383248	2006 BU_{250}	—	January 31, 2006	Kitt Peak	Spacewatch	KON	2.4 km	MPC · JPL
383249	2006 BD_{253}	—	January 28, 2006	Mount Lemmon	Mount Lemmon Survey	·	1.2 km	MPC · JPL
383250	2006 BA_{268}	—	January 26, 2006	Catalina	CSS	·	3.2 km	MPC · JPL
383251	2006 BX_{278}	—	January 26, 2006	Kitt Peak	Spacewatch	·	2.1 km	MPC · JPL
383252	2006 BW_{283}	—	January 23, 2006	Mount Lemmon	Mount Lemmon Survey	HNS	1.1 km	MPC · JPL
383253	2006 CJ_{6}	—	February 1, 2006	Mount Lemmon	Mount Lemmon Survey	·	1.6 km	MPC · JPL
383254	2006 CJ_{9}	—	February 3, 2006	7300	W. K. Y. Yeung	·	1.8 km	MPC · JPL
383255	2006 CV_{26}	—	February 2, 2006	Kitt Peak	Spacewatch	·	1.1 km	MPC · JPL
383256	2006 CV_{33}	—	February 2, 2006	Mount Lemmon	Mount Lemmon Survey	EUN	1.4 km	MPC · JPL
383257	2006 CL_{38}	—	February 2, 2006	Kitt Peak	Spacewatch	·	1.2 km	MPC · JPL
383258	2006 CC_{60}	—	February 7, 2006	Mount Lemmon	Mount Lemmon Survey	H	650 m	MPC · JPL
383259	2006 CY_{62}	—	February 4, 2006	Catalina	CSS	(194)	3.6 km	MPC · JPL
383260	2006 CA_{66}	—	February 6, 2006	Kitt Peak	Spacewatch	·	1.2 km	MPC · JPL
383261	2006 DE_{20}	—	February 20, 2006	Kitt Peak	Spacewatch	·	1.2 km	MPC · JPL
383262	2006 DS_{45}	—	February 20, 2006	Catalina	CSS	(5)	2.8 km	MPC · JPL
383263	2006 DJ_{55}	—	February 24, 2006	Mount Lemmon	Mount Lemmon Survey	·	1.9 km	MPC · JPL
383264	2006 DO_{56}	—	February 24, 2006	Mount Lemmon	Mount Lemmon Survey	·	2.0 km	MPC · JPL
383265	2006 DT_{57}	—	February 24, 2006	Mount Lemmon	Mount Lemmon Survey	·	1.7 km	MPC · JPL
383266	2006 DK_{65}	—	February 21, 2006	Catalina	CSS	·	1.0 km	MPC · JPL
383267	2006 DA_{66}	—	January 28, 2006	Catalina	CSS	·	2.5 km	MPC · JPL
383268	2006 DC_{76}	—	February 24, 2006	Kitt Peak	Spacewatch	(5)	1.2 km	MPC · JPL
383269	2006 DS_{80}	—	February 24, 2006	Kitt Peak	Spacewatch	·	1.5 km	MPC · JPL
383270	2006 DB_{82}	—	February 24, 2006	Kitt Peak	Spacewatch	·	1.6 km	MPC · JPL
383271	2006 DU_{95}	—	February 24, 2006	Kitt Peak	Spacewatch	·	1.8 km	MPC · JPL
383272	2006 DZ_{104}	—	February 25, 2006	Kitt Peak	Spacewatch	·	2.5 km	MPC · JPL
383273	2006 DD_{114}	—	February 27, 2006	Socorro	LINEAR	·	1.6 km	MPC · JPL
383274	2006 DD_{122}	—	February 23, 2006	Anderson Mesa	LONEOS	·	1.1 km	MPC · JPL
383275	2006 DS_{132}	—	February 25, 2006	Kitt Peak	Spacewatch	·	1.3 km	MPC · JPL
383276	2006 DW_{136}	—	February 25, 2006	Kitt Peak	Spacewatch	·	1.8 km	MPC · JPL
383277	2006 DW_{145}	—	February 25, 2006	Mount Lemmon	Mount Lemmon Survey	·	1.1 km	MPC · JPL
383278	2006 DO_{150}	—	September 21, 2003	Kitt Peak	Spacewatch	·	1.9 km	MPC · JPL
383279	2006 DM_{152}	—	February 25, 2006	Kitt Peak	Spacewatch	·	1.7 km	MPC · JPL
383280	2006 DF_{153}	—	February 25, 2006	Mount Lemmon	Mount Lemmon Survey	·	1.1 km	MPC · JPL
383281	2006 DZ_{171}	—	February 27, 2006	Kitt Peak	Spacewatch	·	1.1 km	MPC · JPL
383282	2006 DM_{175}	—	December 9, 2004	Kitt Peak	Spacewatch	AGN	1.4 km	MPC · JPL
383283	2006 DR_{178}	—	February 27, 2006	Mount Lemmon	Mount Lemmon Survey	·	1.8 km	MPC · JPL
383284	2006 DC_{184}	—	February 27, 2006	Kitt Peak	Spacewatch	·	2.4 km	MPC · JPL
383285	2006 DA_{196}	—	February 21, 2006	Catalina	CSS	·	1.4 km	MPC · JPL
383286	2006 DB_{198}	—	February 25, 2006	Catalina	CSS	EUN	1.7 km	MPC · JPL
383287	2006 DB_{199}	—	February 28, 2006	Catalina	CSS	·	3.1 km	MPC · JPL
383288	2006 DL_{201}	—	February 27, 2006	Catalina	CSS	EUN	1.3 km	MPC · JPL
383289	2006 DC_{206}	—	February 25, 2006	Mount Lemmon	Mount Lemmon Survey	·	1.8 km	MPC · JPL
383290	2006 DB_{211}	—	February 24, 2006	Kitt Peak	Spacewatch	·	1.2 km	MPC · JPL
383291	2006 ES_{17}	—	March 2, 2006	Kitt Peak	Spacewatch	·	1.7 km	MPC · JPL
383292	2006 EO_{21}	—	March 3, 2006	Kitt Peak	Spacewatch	(5)	910 m	MPC · JPL
383293	2006 EV_{21}	—	March 3, 2006	Kitt Peak	Spacewatch	·	1.6 km	MPC · JPL
383294	2006 EO_{22}	—	March 3, 2006	Kitt Peak	Spacewatch	·	1.2 km	MPC · JPL
383295	2006 EL_{28}	—	March 3, 2006	Kitt Peak	Spacewatch	·	1.3 km	MPC · JPL
383296	2006 EL_{49}	—	March 4, 2006	Kitt Peak	Spacewatch	·	1.2 km	MPC · JPL
383297	2006 EC_{72}	—	March 2, 2006	Kitt Peak	Spacewatch	·	1.7 km	MPC · JPL
383298	2006 FR_{23}	—	March 24, 2006	Kitt Peak	Spacewatch	·	1.6 km	MPC · JPL
383299	2006 FK_{28}	—	March 24, 2006	Mount Lemmon	Mount Lemmon Survey	·	1.8 km	MPC · JPL
383300	2006 FM_{53}	—	March 23, 2006	Kitt Peak	Spacewatch	·	1.6 km	MPC · JPL

== 383301–383400 ==
back to top

Designation			Discovery			Properties		Ref
Permanent	Provisional	Named after	Date	Site	Discoverer(s)	Category	Diam.	Ref
383301	2006 GR_{5}	—	April 2, 2006	Kitt Peak	Spacewatch	·	2.9 km	MPC · JPL
383302	2006 GA_{8}	—	April 2, 2006	Kitt Peak	Spacewatch	·	2.8 km	MPC · JPL
383303	2006 GV_{37}	—	April 2, 2006	Socorro	LINEAR	·	1.6 km	MPC · JPL
383304	2006 GN_{39}	—	April 2, 2006	Anderson Mesa	LONEOS	·	2.8 km	MPC · JPL
383305	2006 GZ_{43}	—	April 2, 2006	Kitt Peak	Spacewatch	·	1.6 km	MPC · JPL
383306	2006 GU_{49}	—	April 7, 2006	Anderson Mesa	LONEOS	JUN	1.5 km	MPC · JPL
383307	2006 HN_{11}	—	April 19, 2006	Kitt Peak	Spacewatch	·	2.5 km	MPC · JPL
383308	2006 HR_{20}	—	April 19, 2006	Mount Lemmon	Mount Lemmon Survey	·	2.6 km	MPC · JPL
383309	2006 HW_{29}	—	April 18, 2006	Catalina	CSS	ADE	2.8 km	MPC · JPL
383310	2006 HO_{60}	—	April 26, 2006	Anderson Mesa	LONEOS	·	1.7 km	MPC · JPL
383311	2006 HU_{65}	—	April 24, 2006	Kitt Peak	Spacewatch	·	1.7 km	MPC · JPL
383312	2006 HN_{67}	—	April 24, 2006	Mount Lemmon	Mount Lemmon Survey	·	2.3 km	MPC · JPL
383313	2006 HZ_{70}	—	April 25, 2006	Catalina	CSS	·	3.0 km	MPC · JPL
383314	2006 HT_{74}	—	April 25, 2006	Kitt Peak	Spacewatch	·	1.6 km	MPC · JPL
383315	2006 HA_{77}	—	April 25, 2006	Kitt Peak	Spacewatch	·	2.2 km	MPC · JPL
383316	2006 HU_{82}	—	April 26, 2006	Kitt Peak	Spacewatch	·	2.2 km	MPC · JPL
383317	2006 HC_{92}	—	April 29, 2006	Kitt Peak	Spacewatch	·	2.0 km	MPC · JPL
383318	2006 HN_{93}	—	April 29, 2006	Kitt Peak	Spacewatch	·	2.2 km	MPC · JPL
383319	2006 HO_{102}	—	April 30, 2006	Kitt Peak	Spacewatch	·	2.1 km	MPC · JPL
383320	2006 HH_{120}	—	April 30, 2006	Kitt Peak	Spacewatch	·	1.9 km	MPC · JPL
383321	2006 HN_{121}	—	April 30, 2006	Kitt Peak	Spacewatch	·	2.2 km	MPC · JPL
383322	2006 HB_{151}	—	April 26, 2006	Cerro Tololo	M. W. Buie	·	2.6 km	MPC · JPL
383323	2006 JL_{6}	—	May 2, 2006	Mount Nyukasa	Japan Aerospace Exploration Agency	ADE	2.8 km	MPC · JPL
383324	2006 JU_{18}	—	April 24, 2006	Kitt Peak	Spacewatch	BRA	1.6 km	MPC · JPL
383325	2006 JR_{41}	—	May 7, 2006	Kitt Peak	Spacewatch	·	2.8 km	MPC · JPL
383326	2006 KF_{12}	—	May 20, 2006	Kitt Peak	Spacewatch	·	2.4 km	MPC · JPL
383327	2006 KD_{17}	—	May 20, 2006	Catalina	CSS	·	2.4 km	MPC · JPL
383328	2006 KW_{18}	—	May 21, 2006	Kitt Peak	Spacewatch	·	2.4 km	MPC · JPL
383329	2006 KG_{38}	—	May 19, 2006	Anderson Mesa	LONEOS	·	2.0 km	MPC · JPL
383330	2006 KM_{41}	—	May 19, 2006	Mount Lemmon	Mount Lemmon Survey	·	1.6 km	MPC · JPL
383331	2006 KS_{48}	—	May 21, 2006	Kitt Peak	Spacewatch	AGN	1.4 km	MPC · JPL
383332	2006 KY_{57}	—	January 16, 2005	Kitt Peak	Spacewatch	AGN	1.3 km	MPC · JPL
383333	2006 KZ_{59}	—	May 22, 2006	Kitt Peak	Spacewatch	·	2.5 km	MPC · JPL
383334	2006 KB_{61}	—	May 22, 2006	Kitt Peak	Spacewatch	·	1.6 km	MPC · JPL
383335	2006 KB_{66}	—	May 24, 2006	Mount Lemmon	Mount Lemmon Survey	KOR	1.4 km	MPC · JPL
383336	2006 KW_{105}	—	May 21, 2006	Kitt Peak	Spacewatch	·	2.5 km	MPC · JPL
383337	2006 KH_{120}	—	April 20, 2006	Kitt Peak	Spacewatch	H	660 m	MPC · JPL
383338	2006 KZ_{122}	—	May 26, 2006	Catalina	CSS	·	2.0 km	MPC · JPL
383339	2006 PX_{10}	—	August 13, 2006	Palomar	NEAT	·	4.1 km	MPC · JPL
383340	2006 PN_{19}	—	August 13, 2006	Palomar	NEAT	·	3.5 km	MPC · JPL
383341	2006 PQ_{37}	—	August 13, 2006	Palomar	NEAT	·	3.4 km	MPC · JPL
383342	2006 QT_{22}	—	August 19, 2006	Palomar	NEAT	·	4.6 km	MPC · JPL
383343	2006 QY_{96}	—	August 16, 2006	Palomar	NEAT	·	1.4 km	MPC · JPL
383344	2006 QS_{103}	—	August 27, 2006	Kitt Peak	Spacewatch	·	540 m	MPC · JPL
383345	2006 QV_{107}	—	August 28, 2006	Catalina	CSS	·	3.2 km	MPC · JPL
383346	2006 QE_{110}	—	August 28, 2006	Kitt Peak	Spacewatch	·	1.8 km	MPC · JPL
383347	2006 QF_{160}	—	August 19, 2006	Kitt Peak	Spacewatch	·	2.5 km	MPC · JPL
383348	2006 QJ_{170}	—	August 26, 2006	Siding Spring	SSS	PHO	1.3 km	MPC · JPL
383349	2006 RC_{23}	—	September 12, 2006	Catalina	CSS	·	750 m	MPC · JPL
383350	2006 RS_{25}	—	August 29, 2006	Kitt Peak	Spacewatch	·	3.0 km	MPC · JPL
383351	2006 RK_{27}	—	September 14, 2006	Catalina	CSS	·	770 m	MPC · JPL
383352	2006 RS_{28}	—	September 15, 2006	Kitt Peak	Spacewatch	EOS	2.0 km	MPC · JPL
383353	2006 RP_{40}	—	September 14, 2006	Kitt Peak	Spacewatch	(43176)	3.6 km	MPC · JPL
383354	2006 RW_{56}	—	September 14, 2006	Kitt Peak	Spacewatch	·	750 m	MPC · JPL
383355	2006 RQ_{121}	—	September 15, 2006	Kitt Peak	Spacewatch	EOS	3.6 km	MPC · JPL
383356	2006 RG_{122}	—	September 6, 2006	Palomar	NEAT	·	930 m	MPC · JPL
383357	2006 SC_{9}	—	September 16, 2006	Catalina	CSS	·	1.3 km	MPC · JPL
383358	2006 SW_{10}	—	September 16, 2006	Kitt Peak	Spacewatch	·	2.0 km	MPC · JPL
383359	2006 SZ_{10}	—	September 16, 2006	Kitt Peak	Spacewatch	·	3.5 km	MPC · JPL
383360	2006 SP_{17}	—	September 17, 2006	Kitt Peak	Spacewatch	·	1.1 km	MPC · JPL
383361	2006 SL_{28}	—	September 30, 2003	Kitt Peak	Spacewatch	·	620 m	MPC · JPL
383362	2006 SE_{41}	—	September 18, 2006	Catalina	CSS	·	650 m	MPC · JPL
383363	2006 SQ_{41}	—	September 18, 2006	Kitt Peak	Spacewatch	·	2.9 km	MPC · JPL
383364	2006 SN_{59}	—	September 16, 2006	Anderson Mesa	LONEOS	·	880 m	MPC · JPL
383365	2006 SV_{59}	—	September 18, 2006	Catalina	CSS	·	790 m	MPC · JPL
383366	2006 SO_{76}	—	September 19, 2006	Kitt Peak	Spacewatch	·	770 m	MPC · JPL
383367	2006 SA_{111}	—	September 21, 2006	Anderson Mesa	LONEOS	·	960 m	MPC · JPL
383368	2006 SZ_{114}	—	September 24, 2006	Kitt Peak	Spacewatch	·	2.7 km	MPC · JPL
383369	2006 SD_{121}	—	September 18, 2006	Catalina	CSS	·	990 m	MPC · JPL
383370	2006 SG_{133}	—	September 17, 2006	Catalina	CSS	·	780 m	MPC · JPL
383371	2006 SU_{163}	—	September 24, 2006	Kitt Peak	Spacewatch	·	670 m	MPC · JPL
383372	2006 SC_{167}	—	September 25, 2006	Kitt Peak	Spacewatch	·	3.8 km	MPC · JPL
383373	2006 SJ_{169}	—	September 25, 2006	Kitt Peak	Spacewatch	·	2.7 km	MPC · JPL
383374	2006 SH_{213}	—	September 17, 2006	Catalina	CSS	·	3.2 km	MPC · JPL
383375	2006 SZ_{214}	—	September 27, 2006	Kitt Peak	Spacewatch	·	710 m	MPC · JPL
383376	2006 SN_{229}	—	September 18, 2006	Kitt Peak	Spacewatch	·	720 m	MPC · JPL
383377	2006 SQ_{252}	—	September 26, 2006	Kitt Peak	Spacewatch	·	620 m	MPC · JPL
383378	2006 SZ_{261}	—	September 26, 2006	Mount Lemmon	Mount Lemmon Survey	·	690 m	MPC · JPL
383379	2006 SL_{289}	—	September 26, 2006	Catalina	CSS	·	3.5 km	MPC · JPL
383380	2006 SF_{316}	—	September 27, 2006	Kitt Peak	Spacewatch	HYG	2.9 km	MPC · JPL
383381	2006 SY_{364}	—	December 17, 2003	Socorro	LINEAR	·	720 m	MPC · JPL
383382	2006 SG_{376}	—	September 17, 2006	Apache Point	A. C. Becker	·	2.8 km	MPC · JPL
383383	2006 SW_{384}	—	September 29, 2006	Apache Point	A. C. Becker	·	3.1 km	MPC · JPL
383384	2006 SG_{396}	—	September 17, 2006	Kitt Peak	Spacewatch	·	3.3 km	MPC · JPL
383385	2006 SB_{409}	—	September 27, 2006	Mount Lemmon	Mount Lemmon Survey	·	750 m	MPC · JPL
383386	2006 TR_{8}	—	October 4, 2006	Mount Lemmon	Mount Lemmon Survey	·	750 m	MPC · JPL
383387	2006 TC_{11}	—	October 11, 2006	Kitt Peak	Spacewatch	·	3.4 km	MPC · JPL
383388	2006 TK_{18}	—	September 30, 2006	Catalina	CSS	EOS	2.6 km	MPC · JPL
383389	2006 TJ_{21}	—	October 11, 2006	Kitt Peak	Spacewatch	·	790 m	MPC · JPL
383390	2006 TA_{22}	—	October 11, 2006	Kitt Peak	Spacewatch	·	800 m	MPC · JPL
383391	2006 TL_{23}	—	September 30, 2006	Mount Lemmon	Mount Lemmon Survey	·	660 m	MPC · JPL
383392	2006 TU_{23}	—	October 11, 2006	Kitt Peak	Spacewatch	·	730 m	MPC · JPL
383393	2006 TE_{30}	—	September 30, 2006	Mount Lemmon	Mount Lemmon Survey	fast	730 m	MPC · JPL
383394	2006 TP_{33}	—	October 12, 2006	Kitt Peak	Spacewatch	·	4.5 km	MPC · JPL
383395	2006 TB_{59}	—	October 13, 2006	Eskridge	Farpoint	·	760 m	MPC · JPL
383396	2006 TB_{63}	—	October 10, 2006	Palomar	NEAT	·	3.7 km	MPC · JPL
383397	2006 TN_{71}	—	October 11, 2006	Palomar	NEAT	·	560 m	MPC · JPL
383398	2006 TE_{76}	—	October 11, 2006	Palomar	NEAT	·	730 m	MPC · JPL
383399	2006 TM_{87}	—	October 13, 2006	Kitt Peak	Spacewatch	·	790 m	MPC · JPL
383400	2006 TU_{116}	—	October 3, 2006	Apache Point	A. C. Becker	·	2.7 km	MPC · JPL

== 383401–383500 ==
back to top

Designation			Discovery			Properties		Ref
Permanent	Provisional	Named after	Date	Site	Discoverer(s)	Category	Diam.	Ref
383401	2006 UU_{6}	—	October 16, 2006	Catalina	CSS	·	960 m	MPC · JPL
383402	2006 UD_{19}	—	September 25, 2006	Kitt Peak	Spacewatch	·	3.0 km	MPC · JPL
383403	2006 UV_{23}	—	October 16, 2006	Kitt Peak	Spacewatch	·	3.6 km	MPC · JPL
383404	2006 UL_{27}	—	October 16, 2006	Kitt Peak	Spacewatch	·	4.4 km	MPC · JPL
383405	2006 UG_{56}	—	August 27, 2006	Anderson Mesa	LONEOS	·	810 m	MPC · JPL
383406	2006 US_{67}	—	October 16, 2006	Catalina	CSS	·	810 m	MPC · JPL
383407	2006 UF_{70}	—	October 16, 2006	Catalina	CSS	·	780 m	MPC · JPL
383408	2006 UQ_{108}	—	October 18, 2006	Kitt Peak	Spacewatch	·	710 m	MPC · JPL
383409	2006 UN_{127}	—	October 19, 2006	Kitt Peak	Spacewatch	·	660 m	MPC · JPL
383410	2006 UQ_{137}	—	October 19, 2006	Mount Lemmon	Mount Lemmon Survey	·	700 m	MPC · JPL
383411	2006 UV_{181}	—	October 16, 2006	Catalina	CSS	·	850 m	MPC · JPL
383412	2006 UL_{194}	—	October 20, 2006	Kitt Peak	Spacewatch	·	3.3 km	MPC · JPL
383413	2006 UZ_{201}	—	October 22, 2006	Palomar	NEAT	·	710 m	MPC · JPL
383414	2006 UV_{211}	—	October 23, 2006	Kitt Peak	Spacewatch	·	840 m	MPC · JPL
383415	2006 UM_{213}	—	October 23, 2006	Kitt Peak	Spacewatch	·	790 m	MPC · JPL
383416	2006 UC_{215}	—	October 26, 2006	Kitami	K. Endate	·	900 m	MPC · JPL
383417 DAO	2006 UY_{216}	DAO	October 23, 2006	Mauna Kea	D. D. Balam	·	3.2 km	MPC · JPL
383418	2006 UZ_{226}	—	October 20, 2006	Palomar	NEAT	fast	760 m	MPC · JPL
383419	2006 UM_{228}	—	October 20, 2006	Palomar	NEAT	·	830 m	MPC · JPL
383420	2006 UG_{245}	—	October 27, 2006	Mount Lemmon	Mount Lemmon Survey	·	870 m	MPC · JPL
383421	2006 UV_{249}	—	October 16, 2006	Kitt Peak	Spacewatch	·	600 m	MPC · JPL
383422	2006 UN_{286}	—	October 28, 2006	Kitt Peak	Spacewatch	·	880 m	MPC · JPL
383423	2006 UR_{329}	—	October 28, 2006	Kitt Peak	Spacewatch	·	800 m	MPC · JPL
383424	2006 UD_{330}	—	October 16, 2006	Apache Point	A. C. Becker	·	3.6 km	MPC · JPL
383425	2006 UL_{346}	—	October 21, 2006	Kitt Peak	Spacewatch	·	830 m	MPC · JPL
383426	2006 UO_{346}	—	October 22, 2006	Mount Lemmon	Mount Lemmon Survey	·	720 m	MPC · JPL
383427	2006 VE_{24}	—	November 10, 2006	Kitt Peak	Spacewatch	·	590 m	MPC · JPL
383428	2006 VR_{49}	—	November 10, 2006	Kitt Peak	Spacewatch	·	820 m	MPC · JPL
383429	2006 VM_{58}	—	November 11, 2006	Kitt Peak	Spacewatch	·	870 m	MPC · JPL
383430	2006 VC_{63}	—	November 11, 2006	Kitt Peak	Spacewatch	·	750 m	MPC · JPL
383431	2006 VM_{64}	—	September 28, 2006	Mount Lemmon	Mount Lemmon Survey	·	730 m	MPC · JPL
383432	2006 VQ_{99}	—	October 21, 2006	Mount Lemmon	Mount Lemmon Survey	·	930 m	MPC · JPL
383433	2006 VH_{103}	—	November 12, 2006	Lulin	Lin, H.-C., Q. Ye	(260) · CYB	3.5 km	MPC · JPL
383434	2006 VK_{116}	—	September 18, 2006	Catalina	CSS	·	1.1 km	MPC · JPL
383435	2006 VG_{120}	—	November 14, 2006	Kitt Peak	Spacewatch	·	740 m	MPC · JPL
383436	2006 VT_{133}	—	November 15, 2006	Mount Lemmon	Mount Lemmon Survey	·	770 m	MPC · JPL
383437	2006 VQ_{135}	—	November 15, 2006	Kitt Peak	Spacewatch	·	710 m	MPC · JPL
383438	2006 VS_{136}	—	October 19, 2006	Mount Lemmon	Mount Lemmon Survey	·	790 m	MPC · JPL
383439	2006 VB_{142}	—	November 13, 2006	Palomar	NEAT	·	790 m	MPC · JPL
383440	2006 WB_{8}	—	November 16, 2006	Socorro	LINEAR	BAP	1.0 km	MPC · JPL
383441	2006 WC_{33}	—	September 18, 2006	Kitt Peak	Spacewatch	·	2.7 km	MPC · JPL
383442	2006 WF_{36}	—	November 16, 2006	Kitt Peak	Spacewatch	·	1.1 km	MPC · JPL
383443	2006 WE_{37}	—	November 16, 2006	Kitt Peak	Spacewatch	·	800 m	MPC · JPL
383444	2006 WW_{52}	—	November 16, 2006	Kitt Peak	Spacewatch	·	740 m	MPC · JPL
383445	2006 WY_{61}	—	November 17, 2006	Mount Lemmon	Mount Lemmon Survey	·	750 m	MPC · JPL
383446	2006 WC_{88}	—	November 18, 2006	Mount Lemmon	Mount Lemmon Survey	·	640 m	MPC · JPL
383447	2006 WU_{103}	—	November 19, 2006	Kitt Peak	Spacewatch	NYS	970 m	MPC · JPL
383448	2006 WD_{105}	—	November 19, 2006	Kitt Peak	Spacewatch	·	970 m	MPC · JPL
383449	2006 WK_{127}	—	November 24, 2006	Siding Spring	SSS	·	1.7 km	MPC · JPL
383450	2006 WL_{129}	—	November 23, 2006	Kitt Peak	Spacewatch	·	670 m	MPC · JPL
383451	2006 WV_{152}	—	November 21, 2006	Mount Lemmon	Mount Lemmon Survey	·	800 m	MPC · JPL
383452	2006 WE_{158}	—	November 17, 2006	Kitt Peak	Spacewatch	·	690 m	MPC · JPL
383453	2006 WD_{201}	—	November 16, 2006	Mount Lemmon	Mount Lemmon Survey	·	1.0 km	MPC · JPL
383454	2006 WC_{205}	—	November 19, 2006	Kitt Peak	Spacewatch	CYB	3.2 km	MPC · JPL
383455	2006 XU_{17}	—	December 10, 2006	Kitt Peak	Spacewatch	·	1.1 km	MPC · JPL
383456	2006 XP_{32}	—	December 9, 2006	Kitt Peak	Spacewatch	·	980 m	MPC · JPL
383457	2006 XK_{43}	—	October 23, 2006	Mount Lemmon	Mount Lemmon Survey	·	930 m	MPC · JPL
383458	2006 XW_{43}	—	December 12, 2006	Kitt Peak	Spacewatch	(2076)	1 km	MPC · JPL
383459	2006 XY_{70}	—	December 13, 2006	Mount Lemmon	Mount Lemmon Survey	V	690 m	MPC · JPL
383460	2006 XG_{72}	—	December 10, 2006	Kitt Peak	Spacewatch	·	700 m	MPC · JPL
383461	2006 YP_{3}	—	December 16, 2006	Kitt Peak	Spacewatch	·	770 m	MPC · JPL
383462	2006 YD_{4}	—	December 16, 2006	Mount Lemmon	Mount Lemmon Survey	·	1.9 km	MPC · JPL
383463	2006 YK_{12}	—	December 20, 2006	Mount Nyukasa	Japan Aerospace Exploration Agency	·	1.6 km	MPC · JPL
383464	2006 YH_{18}	—	December 22, 2006	Socorro	LINEAR	·	1.8 km	MPC · JPL
383465	2006 YZ_{18}	—	December 24, 2006	Mount Lemmon	Mount Lemmon Survey	·	1.0 km	MPC · JPL
383466	2006 YJ_{35}	—	December 21, 2006	Kitt Peak	Spacewatch	·	720 m	MPC · JPL
383467	2006 YG_{37}	—	December 21, 2006	Kitt Peak	Spacewatch	V	590 m	MPC · JPL
383468	2006 YH_{38}	—	December 21, 2006	Kitt Peak	Spacewatch	·	1.7 km	MPC · JPL
383469	2006 YV_{39}	—	December 22, 2006	Kitt Peak	Spacewatch	(2076)	970 m	MPC · JPL
383470	2006 YC_{40}	—	December 10, 2006	Kitt Peak	Spacewatch	·	1.4 km	MPC · JPL
383471	2006 YU_{51}	—	December 24, 2006	Mount Lemmon	Mount Lemmon Survey	·	1.3 km	MPC · JPL
383472	2006 YX_{52}	—	December 27, 2006	Mount Lemmon	Mount Lemmon Survey	·	790 m	MPC · JPL
383473	2007 AB_{1}	—	January 8, 2007	Mount Lemmon	Mount Lemmon Survey	·	870 m	MPC · JPL
383474	2007 AC_{5}	—	January 8, 2007	Mount Lemmon	Mount Lemmon Survey	·	760 m	MPC · JPL
383475	2007 AU_{8}	—	January 11, 2007	Gnosca	S. Sposetti	·	750 m	MPC · JPL
383476	2007 AH_{29}	—	January 10, 2007	Mount Lemmon	Mount Lemmon Survey	·	1.0 km	MPC · JPL
383477	2007 AA_{30}	—	January 9, 2007	Kitt Peak	Spacewatch	·	690 m	MPC · JPL
383478	2007 AM_{30}	—	January 10, 2007	Mount Lemmon	Mount Lemmon Survey	MAS	680 m	MPC · JPL
383479	2007 BR	—	January 16, 2007	Socorro	LINEAR	V	780 m	MPC · JPL
383480	2007 BU_{1}	—	January 16, 2007	Mount Lemmon	Mount Lemmon Survey	·	1.2 km	MPC · JPL
383481	2007 BZ_{13}	—	January 17, 2007	Kitt Peak	Spacewatch	·	920 m	MPC · JPL
383482	2007 BN_{14}	—	January 17, 2007	Kitt Peak	Spacewatch	3:2	4.5 km	MPC · JPL
383483	2007 BX_{14}	—	January 17, 2007	Kitt Peak	Spacewatch	·	900 m	MPC · JPL
383484	2007 BA_{22}	—	January 24, 2007	Socorro	LINEAR	·	1.1 km	MPC · JPL
383485	2007 BW_{23}	—	January 24, 2007	Mount Lemmon	Mount Lemmon Survey	·	2.2 km	MPC · JPL
383486	2007 BL_{28}	—	January 24, 2007	Mount Lemmon	Mount Lemmon Survey	MAS	740 m	MPC · JPL
383487	2007 BV_{28}	—	January 17, 2007	Mount Lemmon	Mount Lemmon Survey	3:2 · SHU	4.3 km	MPC · JPL
383488	2007 BK_{40}	—	January 24, 2007	Mount Lemmon	Mount Lemmon Survey	·	790 m	MPC · JPL
383489	2007 BH_{43}	—	January 24, 2007	Mount Lemmon	Mount Lemmon Survey	·	940 m	MPC · JPL
383490	2007 BQ_{43}	—	January 24, 2007	Catalina	CSS	·	1.1 km	MPC · JPL
383491	2007 BF_{48}	—	January 26, 2007	Kitt Peak	Spacewatch	·	1.3 km	MPC · JPL
383492 Aubert	2007 BK_{50}	Aubert	January 21, 2007	Nogales	J.-C. Merlin	·	1.0 km	MPC · JPL
383493	2007 BQ_{51}	—	January 17, 2007	Kitt Peak	Spacewatch	·	720 m	MPC · JPL
383494	2007 BB_{56}	—	November 27, 2006	Mount Lemmon	Mount Lemmon Survey	·	1.6 km	MPC · JPL
383495	2007 BX_{57}	—	January 24, 2007	Socorro	LINEAR	PHO	1.3 km	MPC · JPL
383496	2007 BP_{62}	—	January 10, 2007	Mount Lemmon	Mount Lemmon Survey	·	780 m	MPC · JPL
383497	2007 BW_{62}	—	January 10, 2007	Mount Lemmon	Mount Lemmon Survey	·	980 m	MPC · JPL
383498	2007 BG_{74}	—	January 17, 2007	Kitt Peak	Spacewatch	·	740 m	MPC · JPL
383499	2007 BD_{76}	—	January 28, 2007	Kitt Peak	Spacewatch	·	1.0 km	MPC · JPL
383500	2007 BK_{100}	—	January 17, 2007	Kitt Peak	Spacewatch	·	980 m	MPC · JPL

== 383501–383600 ==
back to top

Designation			Discovery			Properties		Ref
Permanent	Provisional	Named after	Date	Site	Discoverer(s)	Category	Diam.	Ref
383501	2007 CA_{1}	—	February 6, 2007	Kitt Peak	Spacewatch	·	870 m	MPC · JPL
383502	2007 CY_{1}	—	February 6, 2007	Kitt Peak	Spacewatch	·	1.3 km	MPC · JPL
383503	2007 CW_{9}	—	February 6, 2007	Mount Lemmon	Mount Lemmon Survey	·	940 m	MPC · JPL
383504	2007 CD_{11}	—	February 6, 2007	Mount Lemmon	Mount Lemmon Survey	·	840 m	MPC · JPL
383505	2007 CD_{16}	—	February 6, 2007	Mount Lemmon	Mount Lemmon Survey	·	940 m	MPC · JPL
383506	2007 CU_{16}	—	February 8, 2007	Mount Lemmon	Mount Lemmon Survey	·	1.2 km	MPC · JPL
383507	2007 CX_{17}	—	February 8, 2007	Mount Lemmon	Mount Lemmon Survey	V	750 m	MPC · JPL
383508 Vadrot	2007 CV_{18}	Vadrot	February 9, 2007	Nogales	J.-C. Merlin	MAS	820 m	MPC · JPL
383509	2007 CC_{20}	—	February 6, 2007	Palomar	NEAT	NYS	1.1 km	MPC · JPL
383510	2007 CE_{21}	—	February 6, 2007	Mount Lemmon	Mount Lemmon Survey	·	1.1 km	MPC · JPL
383511	2007 CC_{23}	—	January 29, 2007	Mount Lemmon	Mount Lemmon Survey	·	1.5 km	MPC · JPL
383512	2007 CU_{25}	—	February 9, 2007	Kitt Peak	Spacewatch	·	890 m	MPC · JPL
383513	2007 CC_{26}	—	February 9, 2007	Catalina	CSS	·	1.6 km	MPC · JPL
383514	2007 CK_{34}	—	February 6, 2007	Mount Lemmon	Mount Lemmon Survey	3:2	6.0 km	MPC · JPL
383515	2007 CO_{40}	—	February 7, 2007	Kitt Peak	Spacewatch	·	1.3 km	MPC · JPL
383516	2007 CF_{45}	—	February 8, 2007	Palomar	NEAT	·	1.9 km	MPC · JPL
383517	2007 CJ_{45}	—	February 8, 2007	Palomar	NEAT	·	1.3 km	MPC · JPL
383518	2007 CO_{47}	—	February 10, 2007	Palomar	NEAT	·	1.8 km	MPC · JPL
383519	2007 CX_{52}	—	February 13, 2007	Socorro	LINEAR	·	1.1 km	MPC · JPL
383520	2007 CQ_{55}	—	December 13, 2006	Mount Lemmon	Mount Lemmon Survey	·	1.3 km	MPC · JPL
383521	2007 CV_{55}	—	February 13, 2007	Mount Lemmon	Mount Lemmon Survey	NYS	710 m	MPC · JPL
383522	2007 CX_{65}	—	February 8, 2007	Kitt Peak	Spacewatch	·	1 km	MPC · JPL
383523	2007 DE_{2}	—	February 16, 2007	Catalina	CSS	·	1.4 km	MPC · JPL
383524	2007 DD_{5}	—	February 17, 2007	Kitt Peak	Spacewatch	·	950 m	MPC · JPL
383525	2007 DT_{6}	—	February 17, 2007	Mount Lemmon	Mount Lemmon Survey	PHO	2.8 km	MPC · JPL
383526	2007 DB_{18}	—	February 17, 2007	Kitt Peak	Spacewatch	NYS	940 m	MPC · JPL
383527	2007 DT_{21}	—	February 17, 2007	Kitt Peak	Spacewatch	·	2.0 km	MPC · JPL
383528	2007 DN_{36}	—	February 17, 2007	Kitt Peak	Spacewatch	·	1.8 km	MPC · JPL
383529	2007 DG_{41}	—	February 19, 2007	Mount Lemmon	Mount Lemmon Survey	·	1.1 km	MPC · JPL
383530	2007 DE_{45}	—	February 19, 2007	Mount Lemmon	Mount Lemmon Survey	3:2 · SHU	4.0 km	MPC · JPL
383531	2007 DE_{48}	—	February 21, 2007	Mount Lemmon	Mount Lemmon Survey	·	1.6 km	MPC · JPL
383532	2007 DY_{48}	—	February 21, 2007	Mount Lemmon	Mount Lemmon Survey	MAS	770 m	MPC · JPL
383533	2007 DW_{52}	—	February 19, 2007	Mount Lemmon	Mount Lemmon Survey	·	980 m	MPC · JPL
383534	2007 DG_{54}	—	February 21, 2007	Kitt Peak	Spacewatch	NYS	1.2 km	MPC · JPL
383535	2007 DS_{55}	—	February 21, 2007	Kitt Peak	Spacewatch	·	1.2 km	MPC · JPL
383536	2007 DY_{55}	—	February 21, 2007	Kitt Peak	Spacewatch	·	1.2 km	MPC · JPL
383537	2007 DK_{59}	—	October 1, 2005	Catalina	CSS	·	1.2 km	MPC · JPL
383538	2007 DT_{64}	—	February 21, 2007	Kitt Peak	Spacewatch	·	1.6 km	MPC · JPL
383539	2007 DJ_{67}	—	February 21, 2007	Kitt Peak	Spacewatch	·	1.3 km	MPC · JPL
383540	2007 DL_{70}	—	February 21, 2007	Kitt Peak	Spacewatch	·	1.1 km	MPC · JPL
383541	2007 DR_{76}	—	January 23, 2007	Anderson Mesa	LONEOS	·	1.5 km	MPC · JPL
383542	2007 DM_{83}	—	February 25, 2007	Mount Lemmon	Mount Lemmon Survey	MAS	850 m	MPC · JPL
383543	2007 DN_{83}	—	February 25, 2007	Mount Lemmon	Mount Lemmon Survey	·	1.8 km	MPC · JPL
383544	2007 DN_{90}	—	February 23, 2007	Kitt Peak	Spacewatch	·	750 m	MPC · JPL
383545	2007 DQ_{91}	—	February 23, 2007	Mount Lemmon	Mount Lemmon Survey	MAS	770 m	MPC · JPL
383546	2007 DN_{92}	—	February 23, 2007	Kitt Peak	Spacewatch	·	1.3 km	MPC · JPL
383547	2007 DR_{106}	—	February 17, 2007	Mount Lemmon	Mount Lemmon Survey	·	960 m	MPC · JPL
383548	2007 EM_{4}	—	March 9, 2007	Mount Lemmon	Mount Lemmon Survey	·	800 m	MPC · JPL
383549	2007 ET_{5}	—	January 27, 2007	Mount Lemmon	Mount Lemmon Survey	·	1.4 km	MPC · JPL
383550	2007 ET_{8}	—	March 9, 2007	Mount Lemmon	Mount Lemmon Survey	MAS	760 m	MPC · JPL
383551	2007 EA_{9}	—	March 9, 2007	Mount Lemmon	Mount Lemmon Survey	·	1.1 km	MPC · JPL
383552	2007 EX_{10}	—	March 9, 2007	Kitt Peak	Spacewatch	·	1.1 km	MPC · JPL
383553	2007 EM_{15}	—	February 9, 2007	Kitt Peak	Spacewatch	·	1.4 km	MPC · JPL
383554	2007 EN_{17}	—	March 9, 2007	Mount Lemmon	Mount Lemmon Survey	·	940 m	MPC · JPL
383555	2007 EG_{22}	—	February 7, 2007	Kitt Peak	Spacewatch	·	1.1 km	MPC · JPL
383556	2007 EH_{28}	—	March 9, 2007	Mount Lemmon	Mount Lemmon Survey	·	790 m	MPC · JPL
383557	2007 EC_{39}	—	March 12, 2007	Mount Lemmon	Mount Lemmon Survey	NYS	930 m	MPC · JPL
383558	2007 EQ_{41}	—	March 9, 2007	Mount Lemmon	Mount Lemmon Survey	·	1.1 km	MPC · JPL
383559	2007 EV_{58}	—	March 9, 2007	Mount Lemmon	Mount Lemmon Survey	·	1.3 km	MPC · JPL
383560	2007 EZ_{72}	—	March 10, 2007	Kitt Peak	Spacewatch	·	2.0 km	MPC · JPL
383561	2007 EV_{104}	—	February 26, 2007	Mount Lemmon	Mount Lemmon Survey	NYS	950 m	MPC · JPL
383562	2007 EW_{104}	—	March 11, 2007	Mount Lemmon	Mount Lemmon Survey	·	880 m	MPC · JPL
383563	2007 EV_{129}	—	March 9, 2007	Mount Lemmon	Mount Lemmon Survey	·	860 m	MPC · JPL
383564	2007 EP_{136}	—	March 10, 2007	Mount Lemmon	Mount Lemmon Survey	MAS	640 m	MPC · JPL
383565	2007 ES_{136}	—	March 10, 2007	Kitt Peak	Spacewatch	ERI	1.5 km	MPC · JPL
383566	2007 EQ_{150}	—	March 12, 2007	Mount Lemmon	Mount Lemmon Survey	NYS	1.3 km	MPC · JPL
383567	2007 EQ_{156}	—	March 12, 2007	Kitt Peak	Spacewatch	·	1.2 km	MPC · JPL
383568	2007 EO_{158}	—	March 14, 2007	Mount Lemmon	Mount Lemmon Survey	·	910 m	MPC · JPL
383569	2007 EY_{161}	—	January 29, 2007	Kitt Peak	Spacewatch	·	1.1 km	MPC · JPL
383570	2007 EY_{169}	—	March 14, 2007	Mount Lemmon	Mount Lemmon Survey	MAS	700 m	MPC · JPL
383571	2007 EJ_{179}	—	March 14, 2007	Kitt Peak	Spacewatch	·	1.2 km	MPC · JPL
383572	2007 ES_{184}	—	March 13, 2007	Catalina	CSS	·	1.3 km	MPC · JPL
383573	2007 ER_{189}	—	March 13, 2007	Mount Lemmon	Mount Lemmon Survey	·	1.1 km	MPC · JPL
383574	2007 ER_{191}	—	March 13, 2007	Kitt Peak	Spacewatch	·	1.2 km	MPC · JPL
383575	2007 ED_{198}	—	March 15, 2007	Kitt Peak	Spacewatch	·	1.2 km	MPC · JPL
383576	2007 EA_{207}	—	March 14, 2007	Kitt Peak	Spacewatch	·	1.0 km	MPC · JPL
383577	2007 EK_{210}	—	March 8, 2007	Palomar	NEAT	·	1.1 km	MPC · JPL
383578	2007 EA_{214}	—	March 11, 2007	Mount Lemmon	Mount Lemmon Survey	·	1.2 km	MPC · JPL
383579	2007 FU_{1}	—	March 17, 2007	Anderson Mesa	LONEOS	·	1.4 km	MPC · JPL
383580	2007 FA_{3}	—	March 17, 2007	Anderson Mesa	LONEOS	·	1.6 km	MPC · JPL
383581	2007 FS_{22}	—	March 20, 2007	Kitt Peak	Spacewatch	·	1.2 km	MPC · JPL
383582	2007 FN_{36}	—	March 26, 2007	Mount Lemmon	Mount Lemmon Survey	·	1.1 km	MPC · JPL
383583	2007 FP_{45}	—	March 26, 2007	Mount Lemmon	Mount Lemmon Survey	MAS	680 m	MPC · JPL
383584	2007 GD_{1}	—	April 9, 2007	Črni Vrh	Skvarč, J.	·	4.2 km	MPC · JPL
383585	2007 GP_{8}	—	April 7, 2007	Mount Lemmon	Mount Lemmon Survey	·	1.6 km	MPC · JPL
383586	2007 GY_{11}	—	April 11, 2007	Kitt Peak	Spacewatch	·	1.6 km	MPC · JPL
383587	2007 GF_{16}	—	March 11, 2007	Mount Lemmon	Mount Lemmon Survey	MAR	1.4 km	MPC · JPL
383588	2007 GC_{33}	—	April 11, 2007	Kitt Peak	Spacewatch	MAS	790 m	MPC · JPL
383589	2007 GQ_{33}	—	April 11, 2007	Mount Lemmon	Mount Lemmon Survey	·	1.1 km	MPC · JPL
383590	2007 GQ_{45}	—	April 14, 2007	Kitt Peak	Spacewatch	·	1.7 km	MPC · JPL
383591	2007 GU_{45}	—	March 14, 2007	Mount Lemmon	Mount Lemmon Survey	MRX	1.6 km	MPC · JPL
383592	2007 GC_{52}	—	April 15, 2007	Kitt Peak	Spacewatch	·	1.4 km	MPC · JPL
383593	2007 GV_{61}	—	April 15, 2007	Catalina	CSS	NYS	1.2 km	MPC · JPL
383594	2007 GO_{70}	—	April 15, 2007	Mount Lemmon	Mount Lemmon Survey	·	1.1 km	MPC · JPL
383595	2007 HB_{1}	—	April 16, 2007	Catalina	CSS	·	1.5 km	MPC · JPL
383596	2007 HT_{2}	—	April 16, 2007	Mount Lemmon	Mount Lemmon Survey	·	1.1 km	MPC · JPL
383597	2007 HO_{9}	—	April 18, 2007	Kitt Peak	Spacewatch	·	2.4 km	MPC · JPL
383598	2007 HU_{14}	—	April 20, 2007	Saint-Sulpice	B. Christophe	·	1.2 km	MPC · JPL
383599	2007 HH_{20}	—	April 18, 2007	Kitt Peak	Spacewatch	·	1.6 km	MPC · JPL
383600	2007 HK_{24}	—	April 18, 2007	Kitt Peak	Spacewatch	NYS	1.1 km	MPC · JPL

== 383601–383700 ==
back to top

Designation			Discovery			Properties		Ref
Permanent	Provisional	Named after	Date	Site	Discoverer(s)	Category	Diam.	Ref
383601	2007 HF_{29}	—	April 19, 2007	Mount Lemmon	Mount Lemmon Survey	·	1.1 km	MPC · JPL
383602	2007 HU_{35}	—	April 19, 2007	Kitt Peak	Spacewatch	·	1.6 km	MPC · JPL
383603	2007 HW_{36}	—	April 19, 2007	Kitt Peak	Spacewatch	·	1.1 km	MPC · JPL
383604	2007 HA_{42}	—	April 22, 2007	Mount Lemmon	Mount Lemmon Survey	NYS	1.0 km	MPC · JPL
383605	2007 HW_{76}	—	April 23, 2007	Kitt Peak	Spacewatch	·	2.7 km	MPC · JPL
383606	2007 HP_{83}	—	April 23, 2007	Kitt Peak	Spacewatch	·	1.2 km	MPC · JPL
383607	2007 JC_{10}	—	May 5, 2007	Bergisch Gladbach	W. Bickel	·	1.2 km	MPC · JPL
383608	2007 JX_{17}	—	May 7, 2007	Mount Lemmon	Mount Lemmon Survey	ADE	2.5 km	MPC · JPL
383609	2007 JJ_{20}	—	May 11, 2007	Mount Lemmon	Mount Lemmon Survey	NYS	1.1 km	MPC · JPL
383610	2007 JJ_{35}	—	May 14, 2007	Siding Spring	SSS	AMO	720 m	MPC · JPL
383611	2007 JF_{42}	—	May 11, 2007	Kitt Peak	Spacewatch	H	670 m	MPC · JPL
383612	2007 KD_{3}	—	May 21, 2007	Catalina	CSS	·	4.1 km	MPC · JPL
383613	2007 KW_{7}	—	April 16, 2007	Catalina	CSS	EUN	1.6 km	MPC · JPL
383614	2007 LL_{3}	—	May 13, 2007	Kitt Peak	Spacewatch	·	1.6 km	MPC · JPL
383615	2007 LQ_{12}	—	June 9, 2007	Kitt Peak	Spacewatch	DOR	2.8 km	MPC · JPL
383616	2007 LW_{21}	—	June 12, 2007	Kitt Peak	Spacewatch	·	2.2 km	MPC · JPL
383617	2007 MS	—	June 16, 2007	Kitt Peak	Spacewatch	·	1.5 km	MPC · JPL
383618	2007 ME_{21}	—	June 21, 2007	Mount Lemmon	Mount Lemmon Survey	EUN	1.7 km	MPC · JPL
383619	2007 MP_{27}	—	June 23, 2007	Siding Spring	SSS	MAR	1.5 km	MPC · JPL
383620	2007 NG_{3}	—	July 13, 2007	Wrightwood	J. W. Young	·	1.6 km	MPC · JPL
383621	2007 NQ_{5}	—	July 13, 2007	Lulin	LUSS	T_{j} (2.94)	8.0 km	MPC · JPL
383622 Luigivolta	2007 PJ_{9}	Luigivolta	August 11, 2007	Vallemare Borbona	V. S. Casulli	·	2.1 km	MPC · JPL
383623	2007 PF_{12}	—	August 10, 2007	Tiki	S. F. Hönig, Teamo, N.	·	2.9 km	MPC · JPL
383624	2007 PH_{21}	—	August 9, 2007	Socorro	LINEAR	H	800 m	MPC · JPL
383625	2007 PK_{34}	—	August 8, 2007	Socorro	LINEAR	·	2.7 km	MPC · JPL
383626	2007 QE_{15}	—	May 4, 2006	Kitt Peak	Spacewatch	·	1.6 km	MPC · JPL
383627	2007 RO_{42}	—	March 8, 2005	Kitt Peak	Spacewatch	·	2.7 km	MPC · JPL
383628	2007 RF_{67}	—	September 10, 2007	Mount Lemmon	Mount Lemmon Survey	·	1.8 km	MPC · JPL
383629	2007 RO_{77}	—	September 10, 2007	Mount Lemmon	Mount Lemmon Survey	·	1.3 km	MPC · JPL
383630	2007 RW_{93}	—	September 10, 2007	Kitt Peak	Spacewatch	EOS	1.7 km	MPC · JPL
383631	2007 RD_{95}	—	September 10, 2007	Kitt Peak	Spacewatch	KOR	1.4 km	MPC · JPL
383632	2007 RH_{162}	—	September 12, 2007	Anderson Mesa	LONEOS	·	3.0 km	MPC · JPL
383633	2007 RY_{162}	—	August 10, 2007	Kitt Peak	Spacewatch	·	1.9 km	MPC · JPL
383634	2007 RH_{170}	—	August 24, 2007	Kitt Peak	Spacewatch	·	1.9 km	MPC · JPL
383635	2007 RC_{173}	—	September 10, 2007	Kitt Peak	Spacewatch	·	3.3 km	MPC · JPL
383636	2007 RL_{208}	—	September 10, 2007	Kitt Peak	Spacewatch	·	1.9 km	MPC · JPL
383637	2007 RH_{226}	—	September 10, 2007	Kitt Peak	Spacewatch	·	2.6 km	MPC · JPL
383638	2007 RT_{247}	—	September 13, 2007	Catalina	CSS	TIR	2.7 km	MPC · JPL
383639	2007 RF_{251}	—	December 20, 2004	Mount Lemmon	Mount Lemmon Survey	·	2.2 km	MPC · JPL
383640	2007 RE_{288}	—	September 11, 2007	Kitt Peak	Spacewatch	·	2.3 km	MPC · JPL
383641	2007 RW_{291}	—	September 12, 2007	Mount Lemmon	Mount Lemmon Survey	·	2.2 km	MPC · JPL
383642	2007 RJ_{292}	—	September 12, 2007	Mount Lemmon	Mount Lemmon Survey	·	1.4 km	MPC · JPL
383643	2007 RN_{292}	—	September 12, 2007	Mount Lemmon	Mount Lemmon Survey	·	2.1 km	MPC · JPL
383644	2007 RD_{294}	—	September 13, 2007	Kitt Peak	Spacewatch	·	1.5 km	MPC · JPL
383645	2007 RA_{298}	—	September 5, 2007	Catalina	CSS	·	2.6 km	MPC · JPL
383646	2007 RJ_{316}	—	September 5, 2007	Anderson Mesa	LONEOS	·	2.2 km	MPC · JPL
383647	2007 RB_{324}	—	September 14, 2007	Socorro	LINEAR	EOS	2.3 km	MPC · JPL
383648	2007 SU_{6}	—	October 16, 1998	Kitt Peak	Spacewatch	·	2.4 km	MPC · JPL
383649	2007 SL_{9}	—	September 18, 2007	Kitt Peak	Spacewatch	·	2.4 km	MPC · JPL
383650	2007 SN_{18}	—	September 20, 2007	Siding Spring	SSS	H	860 m	MPC · JPL
383651	2007 TD_{15}	—	October 8, 2007	Catalina	CSS	·	1.4 km	MPC · JPL
383652	2007 TT_{37}	—	October 4, 2007	Catalina	CSS	THM	2.6 km	MPC · JPL
383653	2007 TK_{46}	—	October 8, 2007	Catalina	CSS	EOS	2.7 km	MPC · JPL
383654	2007 TD_{52}	—	October 4, 2007	Kitt Peak	Spacewatch	·	3.2 km	MPC · JPL
383655	2007 TD_{99}	—	October 8, 2007	Mount Lemmon	Mount Lemmon Survey	·	1.5 km	MPC · JPL
383656	2007 TE_{101}	—	October 8, 2007	Mount Lemmon	Mount Lemmon Survey	·	2.3 km	MPC · JPL
383657	2007 TR_{102}	—	October 8, 2007	Mount Lemmon	Mount Lemmon Survey	THM	2.3 km	MPC · JPL
383658	2007 TZ_{109}	—	October 7, 2007	Catalina	CSS	·	2.8 km	MPC · JPL
383659	2007 TB_{110}	—	September 5, 2007	Catalina	CSS	·	3.2 km	MPC · JPL
383660	2007 TS_{128}	—	October 6, 2007	Kitt Peak	Spacewatch	·	5.1 km	MPC · JPL
383661	2007 TL_{133}	—	October 7, 2007	Mount Lemmon	Mount Lemmon Survey	EOS	1.9 km	MPC · JPL
383662	2007 TG_{137}	—	October 8, 2007	Catalina	CSS	·	3.8 km	MPC · JPL
383663	2007 TX_{138}	—	October 9, 2007	Catalina	CSS	TIR	3.3 km	MPC · JPL
383664	2007 TB_{141}	—	October 9, 2007	Kitt Peak	Spacewatch	EOS	2.4 km	MPC · JPL
383665	2007 TG_{155}	—	September 15, 2007	Anderson Mesa	LONEOS	·	3.7 km	MPC · JPL
383666	2007 TK_{160}	—	October 9, 2007	Socorro	LINEAR	·	2.7 km	MPC · JPL
383667	2007 TY_{167}	—	October 12, 2007	Socorro	LINEAR	·	2.8 km	MPC · JPL
383668	2007 TB_{173}	—	September 10, 2007	Mount Lemmon	Mount Lemmon Survey	·	1.1 km	MPC · JPL
383669	2007 TJ_{175}	—	October 4, 2007	Kitt Peak	Spacewatch	EOS	2.1 km	MPC · JPL
383670	2007 TQ_{175}	—	October 4, 2007	Kitt Peak	Spacewatch	·	2.4 km	MPC · JPL
383671	2007 TH_{180}	—	October 8, 2007	Kitt Peak	Spacewatch	·	1.5 km	MPC · JPL
383672	2007 TC_{183}	—	October 8, 2007	Purple Mountain	PMO NEO Survey Program	EOS	2.7 km	MPC · JPL
383673	2007 TY_{186}	—	September 20, 2007	Kitt Peak	Spacewatch	·	3.1 km	MPC · JPL
383674	2007 TY_{210}	—	October 7, 2007	Kitt Peak	Spacewatch	EOS	1.9 km	MPC · JPL
383675	2007 TL_{211}	—	October 7, 2007	Kitt Peak	Spacewatch	·	3.6 km	MPC · JPL
383676	2007 TT_{214}	—	October 7, 2007	Catalina	CSS	·	3.6 km	MPC · JPL
383677	2007 TS_{225}	—	October 8, 2007	Mount Lemmon	Mount Lemmon Survey	KOR	1.3 km	MPC · JPL
383678	2007 TA_{234}	—	October 8, 2007	Kitt Peak	Spacewatch	·	3.9 km	MPC · JPL
383679	2007 TL_{235}	—	October 9, 2007	Mount Lemmon	Mount Lemmon Survey	·	2.0 km	MPC · JPL
383680	2007 TU_{240}	—	October 5, 2007	Siding Spring	SSS	·	3.3 km	MPC · JPL
383681	2007 TV_{243}	—	October 8, 2007	Catalina	CSS	·	2.9 km	MPC · JPL
383682	2007 TC_{244}	—	October 8, 2007	Catalina	CSS	EOS	2.3 km	MPC · JPL
383683	2007 TO_{250}	—	October 11, 2007	Mount Lemmon	Mount Lemmon Survey	EOS	1.9 km	MPC · JPL
383684	2007 TU_{261}	—	October 10, 2007	Kitt Peak	Spacewatch	VER	3.2 km	MPC · JPL
383685	2007 TX_{266}	—	September 25, 2007	Mount Lemmon	Mount Lemmon Survey	(8737)	3.3 km	MPC · JPL
383686	2007 TR_{271}	—	October 9, 2007	Kitt Peak	Spacewatch	·	2.5 km	MPC · JPL
383687	2007 TU_{304}	—	October 13, 2007	Mount Lemmon	Mount Lemmon Survey	·	1.7 km	MPC · JPL
383688	2007 TX_{314}	—	September 18, 1995	Kitt Peak	Spacewatch	THM	2.7 km	MPC · JPL
383689	2007 TD_{319}	—	October 12, 2007	Kitt Peak	Spacewatch	·	2.7 km	MPC · JPL
383690	2007 TT_{343}	—	October 10, 2007	Mount Lemmon	Mount Lemmon Survey	·	2.6 km	MPC · JPL
383691	2007 TY_{354}	—	May 16, 2005	Kitt Peak	Spacewatch	EOS	2.2 km	MPC · JPL
383692	2007 TW_{360}	—	October 14, 2007	Mount Lemmon	Mount Lemmon Survey	·	3.1 km	MPC · JPL
383693	2007 TG_{382}	—	October 14, 2007	Kitt Peak	Spacewatch	EOS	2.1 km	MPC · JPL
383694	2007 TS_{383}	—	October 14, 2007	Kitt Peak	Spacewatch	THM	2.2 km	MPC · JPL
383695	2007 TZ_{385}	—	October 15, 2007	Catalina	CSS	·	2.7 km	MPC · JPL
383696	2007 TO_{403}	—	October 15, 2007	Kitt Peak	Spacewatch	·	3.1 km	MPC · JPL
383697	2007 TF_{406}	—	October 15, 2007	Kitt Peak	Spacewatch	KOR	1.2 km	MPC · JPL
383698	2007 TU_{407}	—	October 15, 2007	Mount Lemmon	Mount Lemmon Survey	VER	2.4 km	MPC · JPL
383699	2007 TV_{408}	—	October 14, 2007	Catalina	CSS	·	2.7 km	MPC · JPL
383700	2007 TV_{421}	—	September 13, 2007	Catalina	CSS	·	2.4 km	MPC · JPL

== 383701–383800 ==
back to top

Designation			Discovery			Properties		Ref
Permanent	Provisional	Named after	Date	Site	Discoverer(s)	Category	Diam.	Ref
383701	2007 TT_{426}	—	October 9, 2007	Kitt Peak	Spacewatch	·	2.4 km	MPC · JPL
383702	2007 TK_{436}	—	September 4, 2007	Catalina	CSS	BRA · slow	2.1 km	MPC · JPL
383703	2007 TK_{441}	—	October 10, 2007	Catalina	CSS	·	3.5 km	MPC · JPL
383704	2007 TV_{441}	—	October 8, 2007	Catalina	CSS	·	2.1 km	MPC · JPL
383705	2007 TT_{444}	—	October 10, 2007	Kitt Peak	Spacewatch	EOS	2.2 km	MPC · JPL
383706	2007 TA_{445}	—	September 13, 2007	Catalina	CSS	H	660 m	MPC · JPL
383707	2007 TN_{445}	—	October 10, 2007	Mount Lemmon	Mount Lemmon Survey	·	2.8 km	MPC · JPL
383708	2007 TX_{449}	—	October 10, 2007	Kitt Peak	Spacewatch	·	3.2 km	MPC · JPL
383709	2007 TY_{450}	—	October 13, 2007	Mount Lemmon	Mount Lemmon Survey	·	1.2 km	MPC · JPL
383710	2007 UB	—	October 16, 2007	Mayhill	Lowe, A.	·	3.2 km	MPC · JPL
383711	2007 UG_{5}	—	October 10, 2007	Kitt Peak	Spacewatch	·	3.0 km	MPC · JPL
383712	2007 UG_{8}	—	October 16, 2007	Catalina	CSS	THB	2.4 km	MPC · JPL
383713	2007 UW_{24}	—	October 8, 2007	Kitt Peak	Spacewatch	·	2.9 km	MPC · JPL
383714	2007 UU_{37}	—	October 19, 2007	Catalina	CSS	·	2.2 km	MPC · JPL
383715	2007 UL_{43}	—	October 18, 2007	Kitt Peak	Spacewatch	THM	2.6 km	MPC · JPL
383716	2007 UY_{45}	—	October 19, 2007	Catalina	CSS	·	4.0 km	MPC · JPL
383717	2007 UA_{46}	—	March 10, 2005	Mount Lemmon	Mount Lemmon Survey	THM	2.6 km	MPC · JPL
383718	2007 UD_{48}	—	October 20, 2007	Mount Lemmon	Mount Lemmon Survey	THM	2.3 km	MPC · JPL
383719	2007 UN_{59}	—	September 10, 2007	Mount Lemmon	Mount Lemmon Survey	·	2.5 km	MPC · JPL
383720	2007 UW_{72}	—	October 31, 2007	Mount Lemmon	Mount Lemmon Survey	·	2.4 km	MPC · JPL
383721	2007 UD_{77}	—	October 31, 2007	Mount Lemmon	Mount Lemmon Survey	·	3.0 km	MPC · JPL
383722	2007 UN_{79}	—	October 30, 2007	Mount Lemmon	Mount Lemmon Survey	THM	2.1 km	MPC · JPL
383723	2007 UR_{81}	—	October 30, 2007	Kitt Peak	Spacewatch	KOR	1.5 km	MPC · JPL
383724	2007 UJ_{87}	—	October 30, 2007	Kitt Peak	Spacewatch	·	3.5 km	MPC · JPL
383725	2007 UE_{89}	—	October 30, 2007	Mount Lemmon	Mount Lemmon Survey	·	2.5 km	MPC · JPL
383726	2007 UD_{94}	—	September 12, 2007	Mount Lemmon	Mount Lemmon Survey	·	2.0 km	MPC · JPL
383727	2007 UK_{99}	—	September 14, 2007	Mount Lemmon	Mount Lemmon Survey	·	2.9 km	MPC · JPL
383728	2007 UF_{100}	—	October 30, 2007	Kitt Peak	Spacewatch	(21885)	3.8 km	MPC · JPL
383729	2007 UU_{120}	—	October 9, 2007	Kitt Peak	Spacewatch	·	2.1 km	MPC · JPL
383730	2007 UW_{122}	—	October 30, 2007	Kitt Peak	Spacewatch	THM	1.9 km	MPC · JPL
383731	2007 US_{128}	—	October 21, 2007	Mount Lemmon	Mount Lemmon Survey	·	3.2 km	MPC · JPL
383732	2007 UH_{136}	—	October 16, 2007	Catalina	CSS	·	3.3 km	MPC · JPL
383733	2007 UC_{140}	—	October 16, 2007	Mount Lemmon	Mount Lemmon Survey	EOS	2.2 km	MPC · JPL
383734	2007 VS_{4}	—	January 5, 2003	Socorro	LINEAR	·	2.7 km	MPC · JPL
383735	2007 VA_{11}	—	November 1, 2007	Kitt Peak	Spacewatch	T_{j} (2.97)	6.0 km	MPC · JPL
383736	2007 VR_{13}	—	November 1, 2007	Kitt Peak	Spacewatch	·	2.4 km	MPC · JPL
383737	2007 VW_{14}	—	November 1, 2007	Kitt Peak	Spacewatch	VER	3.5 km	MPC · JPL
383738	2007 VA_{30}	—	October 5, 2007	Kitt Peak	Spacewatch	·	3.4 km	MPC · JPL
383739	2007 VD_{33}	—	November 2, 2007	Kitt Peak	Spacewatch	·	4.7 km	MPC · JPL
383740	2007 VY_{47}	—	October 9, 2007	Kitt Peak	Spacewatch	·	2.5 km	MPC · JPL
383741	2007 VN_{50}	—	October 9, 2007	Kitt Peak	Spacewatch	·	3.5 km	MPC · JPL
383742	2007 VM_{54}	—	November 1, 2007	Kitt Peak	Spacewatch	·	2.7 km	MPC · JPL
383743	2007 VB_{61}	—	November 1, 2007	Kitt Peak	Spacewatch	·	2.6 km	MPC · JPL
383744	2007 VA_{84}	—	November 5, 2007	XuYi	PMO NEO Survey Program	·	2.7 km	MPC · JPL
383745	2007 VL_{90}	—	November 4, 2007	Socorro	LINEAR	EOS	2.6 km	MPC · JPL
383746	2007 VA_{93}	—	November 3, 2007	Socorro	LINEAR	·	3.6 km	MPC · JPL
383747	2007 VO_{95}	—	November 8, 2007	Socorro	LINEAR	EOS	2.4 km	MPC · JPL
383748	2007 VO_{97}	—	November 1, 2007	Kitt Peak	Spacewatch	·	2.2 km	MPC · JPL
383749	2007 VD_{114}	—	November 3, 2007	Kitt Peak	Spacewatch	·	2.1 km	MPC · JPL
383750	2007 VS_{117}	—	November 4, 2007	Mount Lemmon	Mount Lemmon Survey	·	3.6 km	MPC · JPL
383751	2007 VH_{118}	—	November 4, 2007	Catalina	CSS	·	3.5 km	MPC · JPL
383752	2007 VR_{122}	—	November 5, 2007	Kitt Peak	Spacewatch	·	3.1 km	MPC · JPL
383753	2007 VH_{146}	—	November 4, 2007	Kitt Peak	Spacewatch	·	4.5 km	MPC · JPL
383754	2007 VF_{148}	—	November 4, 2007	Kitt Peak	Spacewatch	LIX	3.8 km	MPC · JPL
383755	2007 VP_{169}	—	November 5, 2007	Kitt Peak	Spacewatch	·	2.8 km	MPC · JPL
383756	2007 VQ_{186}	—	November 12, 2007	Bisei SG Center	BATTeRS	·	3.9 km	MPC · JPL
383757	2007 VQ_{190}	—	November 5, 2007	Catalina	CSS	·	3.0 km	MPC · JPL
383758	2007 VH_{201}	—	November 9, 2007	Mount Lemmon	Mount Lemmon Survey	·	1.6 km	MPC · JPL
383759	2007 VY_{217}	—	November 9, 2007	Kitt Peak	Spacewatch	·	2.2 km	MPC · JPL
383760	2007 VT_{221}	—	September 26, 2007	Mount Lemmon	Mount Lemmon Survey	VER	3.6 km	MPC · JPL
383761	2007 VJ_{227}	—	November 12, 2007	Catalina	CSS	·	2.8 km	MPC · JPL
383762	2007 VE_{228}	—	November 12, 2007	Mount Lemmon	Mount Lemmon Survey	LIX	3.2 km	MPC · JPL
383763	2007 VL_{232}	—	October 16, 2007	Mount Lemmon	Mount Lemmon Survey	EOS	2.2 km	MPC · JPL
383764	2007 VE_{233}	—	November 7, 2007	Catalina	CSS	EOS	2.4 km	MPC · JPL
383765	2007 VT_{233}	—	November 8, 2007	Kitt Peak	Spacewatch	THM	2.1 km	MPC · JPL
383766	2007 VU_{237}	—	November 11, 2007	Anderson Mesa	LONEOS	·	3.1 km	MPC · JPL
383767	2007 VV_{239}	—	September 15, 2007	Mount Lemmon	Mount Lemmon Survey	·	2.3 km	MPC · JPL
383768	2007 VU_{241}	—	November 12, 2007	Catalina	CSS	·	3.2 km	MPC · JPL
383769	2007 VF_{242}	—	November 5, 2007	XuYi	PMO NEO Survey Program	·	3.2 km	MPC · JPL
383770	2007 VO_{250}	—	November 15, 2007	Mount Lemmon	Mount Lemmon Survey	·	3.4 km	MPC · JPL
383771	2007 VM_{255}	—	November 12, 2007	Mount Lemmon	Mount Lemmon Survey	EOS	2.1 km	MPC · JPL
383772	2007 VP_{287}	—	November 12, 2007	Mount Lemmon	Mount Lemmon Survey	URS	5.6 km	MPC · JPL
383773	2007 VT_{298}	—	November 11, 2007	Catalina	CSS	·	2.9 km	MPC · JPL
383774	2007 VY_{299}	—	November 12, 2007	Catalina	CSS	·	4.1 km	MPC · JPL
383775	2007 VC_{301}	—	November 15, 2007	Catalina	CSS	·	3.3 km	MPC · JPL
383776	2007 VJ_{303}	—	November 2, 2007	Catalina	CSS	·	2.8 km	MPC · JPL
383777	2007 VK_{309}	—	November 12, 2007	Mount Lemmon	Mount Lemmon Survey	EOS	2.5 km	MPC · JPL
383778	2007 VX_{315}	—	November 8, 2007	Catalina	CSS	·	3.2 km	MPC · JPL
383779	2007 VP_{318}	—	October 15, 2007	Mount Lemmon	Mount Lemmon Survey	·	1.9 km	MPC · JPL
383780	2007 VB_{320}	—	October 14, 2007	Catalina	CSS	·	3.1 km	MPC · JPL
383781	2007 VV_{322}	—	November 2, 2007	Socorro	LINEAR	·	3.1 km	MPC · JPL
383782	2007 VH_{323}	—	November 2, 2007	Purple Mountain	PMO NEO Survey Program	·	3.4 km	MPC · JPL
383783	2007 VH_{330}	—	November 3, 2007	Mount Lemmon	Mount Lemmon Survey	·	4.0 km	MPC · JPL
383784	2007 VP_{332}	—	November 8, 2007	Mount Lemmon	Mount Lemmon Survey	·	4.1 km	MPC · JPL
383785	2007 WQ	—	October 17, 2007	Mount Lemmon	Mount Lemmon Survey	·	2.6 km	MPC · JPL
383786	2007 WX_{6}	—	November 18, 2007	Socorro	LINEAR	·	3.2 km	MPC · JPL
383787	2007 WQ_{10}	—	November 17, 2007	Mount Lemmon	Mount Lemmon Survey	·	2.4 km	MPC · JPL
383788	2007 WS_{13}	—	November 18, 2007	Catalina	CSS	T_{j} (2.98)	6.0 km	MPC · JPL
383789	2007 WN_{18}	—	November 18, 2007	Mount Lemmon	Mount Lemmon Survey	·	3.0 km	MPC · JPL
383790	2007 WX_{18}	—	November 18, 2007	Mount Lemmon	Mount Lemmon Survey	·	3.2 km	MPC · JPL
383791	2007 WV_{22}	—	November 17, 2007	Mount Lemmon	Mount Lemmon Survey	(1118)	4.4 km	MPC · JPL
383792	2007 WX_{41}	—	November 18, 2007	Mount Lemmon	Mount Lemmon Survey	·	2.0 km	MPC · JPL
383793	2007 WH_{42}	—	November 18, 2007	Mount Lemmon	Mount Lemmon Survey	EOS	2.4 km	MPC · JPL
383794	2007 WX_{44}	—	November 20, 2007	Mount Lemmon	Mount Lemmon Survey	·	2.4 km	MPC · JPL
383795	2007 WD_{48}	—	November 20, 2007	Mount Lemmon	Mount Lemmon Survey	·	3.9 km	MPC · JPL
383796	2007 WO_{49}	—	November 20, 2007	Mount Lemmon	Mount Lemmon Survey	·	3.2 km	MPC · JPL
383797	2007 XX	—	December 3, 2007	Kanab	Sheridan, E.	·	2.7 km	MPC · JPL
383798	2007 XK_{5}	—	December 4, 2007	Kitt Peak	Spacewatch	(31811)	3.4 km	MPC · JPL
383799	2007 XO_{34}	—	November 8, 2007	Catalina	CSS	·	5.1 km	MPC · JPL
383800	2007 YO_{21}	—	December 16, 2007	Kitt Peak	Spacewatch	·	690 m	MPC · JPL

== 383801–383900 ==
back to top

Designation			Discovery			Properties		Ref
Permanent	Provisional	Named after	Date	Site	Discoverer(s)	Category	Diam.	Ref
383801	2007 YZ_{26}	—	December 5, 2007	Kitt Peak	Spacewatch	·	4.5 km	MPC · JPL
383802	2007 YQ_{30}	—	December 28, 2007	Kitt Peak	Spacewatch	·	3.7 km	MPC · JPL
383803	2007 YD_{49}	—	November 3, 2007	Mount Lemmon	Mount Lemmon Survey	·	3.1 km	MPC · JPL
383804	2007 YQ_{52}	—	December 30, 2007	Catalina	CSS	·	2.7 km	MPC · JPL
383805	2007 YQ_{65}	—	December 31, 2007	Kitt Peak	Spacewatch	·	1.0 km	MPC · JPL
383806	2007 YN_{69}	—	December 30, 2007	Kitt Peak	Spacewatch	·	3.9 km	MPC · JPL
383807	2007 YQ_{69}	—	December 30, 2007	Kitt Peak	Spacewatch	·	2.6 km	MPC · JPL
383808	2007 YB_{72}	—	December 18, 2007	Mount Lemmon	Mount Lemmon Survey	·	3.4 km	MPC · JPL
383809	2008 AC_{6}	—	January 10, 2008	Mount Lemmon	Mount Lemmon Survey	·	3.2 km	MPC · JPL
383810	2008 AD_{6}	—	October 16, 2007	Mount Lemmon	Mount Lemmon Survey	·	3.2 km	MPC · JPL
383811	2008 AE_{34}	—	January 10, 2008	Kitt Peak	Spacewatch	CYB	5.3 km	MPC · JPL
383812	2008 AV_{71}	—	January 13, 2008	Mount Lemmon	Mount Lemmon Survey	THB	3.5 km	MPC · JPL
383813	2008 AQ_{94}	—	January 14, 2008	Kitt Peak	Spacewatch	·	4.9 km	MPC · JPL
383814	2008 BE_{19}	—	December 17, 2007	Mount Lemmon	Mount Lemmon Survey	·	3.4 km	MPC · JPL
383815	2008 BX_{52}	—	January 16, 2008	Kitt Peak	Spacewatch	CYB	5.1 km	MPC · JPL
383816	2008 CP_{32}	—	February 2, 2008	Kitt Peak	Spacewatch	·	710 m	MPC · JPL
383817	2008 CU_{72}	—	February 9, 2008	Saint-Sulpice	B. Christophe	·	740 m	MPC · JPL
383818	2008 CL_{106}	—	February 9, 2008	Mount Lemmon	Mount Lemmon Survey	·	840 m	MPC · JPL
383819	2008 CT_{174}	—	January 19, 2008	Mount Lemmon	Mount Lemmon Survey	·	3.1 km	MPC · JPL
383820	2008 DZ_{18}	—	February 27, 2008	Kitt Peak	Spacewatch	·	760 m	MPC · JPL
383821	2008 DN_{32}	—	January 11, 2008	Mount Lemmon	Mount Lemmon Survey	·	590 m	MPC · JPL
383822	2008 DC_{48}	—	February 28, 2008	Mount Lemmon	Mount Lemmon Survey	·	860 m	MPC · JPL
383823	2008 EE_{12}	—	March 1, 2008	Kitt Peak	Spacewatch	·	540 m	MPC · JPL
383824	2008 EY_{38}	—	March 4, 2008	Kitt Peak	Spacewatch	·	830 m	MPC · JPL
383825	2008 EG_{73}	—	February 14, 2008	Mount Lemmon	Mount Lemmon Survey	·	970 m	MPC · JPL
383826	2008 ES_{83}	—	February 12, 2008	Mount Lemmon	Mount Lemmon Survey	·	900 m	MPC · JPL
383827	2008 EU_{142}	—	March 13, 2008	Kitt Peak	Spacewatch	·	720 m	MPC · JPL
383828	2008 FK_{50}	—	March 28, 2008	Kitt Peak	Spacewatch	·	1.3 km	MPC · JPL
383829	2008 FB_{66}	—	March 28, 2008	Mount Lemmon	Mount Lemmon Survey	·	730 m	MPC · JPL
383830	2008 FN_{66}	—	March 28, 2008	Kitt Peak	Spacewatch	·	1.4 km	MPC · JPL
383831	2008 FZ_{67}	—	February 13, 2008	Mount Lemmon	Mount Lemmon Survey	·	680 m	MPC · JPL
383832	2008 FR_{69}	—	March 28, 2008	Mount Lemmon	Mount Lemmon Survey	·	660 m	MPC · JPL
383833	2008 FS_{99}	—	March 30, 2008	Kitt Peak	Spacewatch	·	890 m	MPC · JPL
383834	2008 FS_{102}	—	March 30, 2008	Kitt Peak	Spacewatch	·	800 m	MPC · JPL
383835	2008 FD_{132}	—	March 16, 2008	Kitt Peak	Spacewatch	3:2	5.3 km	MPC · JPL
383836	2008 GJ_{68}	—	April 6, 2008	Kitt Peak	Spacewatch	·	800 m	MPC · JPL
383837	2008 GV_{73}	—	April 7, 2008	Kitt Peak	Spacewatch	(2076)	890 m	MPC · JPL
383838	2008 GA_{100}	—	April 9, 2008	Kitt Peak	Spacewatch	NYS	1.2 km	MPC · JPL
383839	2008 GM_{102}	—	April 10, 2008	Kitt Peak	Spacewatch	·	1.2 km	MPC · JPL
383840	2008 GT_{123}	—	March 11, 2008	Kitt Peak	Spacewatch	·	800 m	MPC · JPL
383841	2008 HP_{18}	—	April 15, 2008	Mount Lemmon	Mount Lemmon Survey	·	780 m	MPC · JPL
383842	2008 JY_{2}	—	January 30, 2008	Mount Lemmon	Mount Lemmon Survey	PHO	1.5 km	MPC · JPL
383843	2008 JA_{18}	—	May 4, 2008	Kitt Peak	Spacewatch	·	940 m	MPC · JPL
383844	2008 JD_{20}	—	May 7, 2008	Skylive	Tozzi, F.	PHO	1.5 km	MPC · JPL
383845	2008 JE_{22}	—	October 1, 2005	Mount Lemmon	Mount Lemmon Survey	NYS	2.4 km	MPC · JPL
383846	2008 JN_{26}	—	April 15, 2008	Catalina	CSS	PHO	1.4 km	MPC · JPL
383847	2008 JD_{38}	—	May 4, 2008	Kitt Peak	Spacewatch	PHO	990 m	MPC · JPL
383848	2008 KT_{10}	—	May 29, 2008	Mount Lemmon	Mount Lemmon Survey	·	1.2 km	MPC · JPL
383849	2008 LM_{4}	—	June 3, 2008	Mount Lemmon	Mount Lemmon Survey	·	730 m	MPC · JPL
383850	2008 OU_{1}	—	June 16, 2008	Catalina	CSS	·	2.2 km	MPC · JPL
383851	2008 OQ_{6}	—	July 25, 2008	Siding Spring	SSS	·	1.4 km	MPC · JPL
383852	2008 OF_{22}	—	July 30, 2008	Kitt Peak	Spacewatch	·	1.3 km	MPC · JPL
383853	2008 OO_{23}	—	July 28, 2008	Catalina	CSS	·	2.2 km	MPC · JPL
383854	2008 PA_{2}	—	August 3, 2008	La Sagra	OAM	·	1.5 km	MPC · JPL
383855	2008 PO_{5}	—	August 1, 2008	La Sagra	OAM	·	1.5 km	MPC · JPL
383856	2008 PH_{12}	—	August 10, 2008	Črni Vrh	J. Vales, H. Mikuž	·	2.8 km	MPC · JPL
383857	2008 PQ_{17}	—	August 10, 2008	Dauban	Kugel, F.	·	1.9 km	MPC · JPL
383858	2008 PD_{21}	—	August 5, 2008	Siding Spring	SSS	JUN	1.1 km	MPC · JPL
383859	2008 QG	—	January 27, 2003	Anderson Mesa	LONEOS	·	1.2 km	MPC · JPL
383860	2008 QB_{4}	—	August 24, 2008	Altschwendt	W. Ries	EUN	1.5 km	MPC · JPL
383861	2008 QU_{5}	—	August 6, 2008	Siding Spring	SSS	·	2.6 km	MPC · JPL
383862	2008 QR_{24}	—	August 30, 2008	Dauban	Kugel, F.	·	1.2 km	MPC · JPL
383863	2008 QO_{29}	—	August 24, 2008	La Sagra	OAM	·	1.3 km	MPC · JPL
383864	2008 QU_{44}	—	August 23, 2008	Siding Spring	SSS	·	2.1 km	MPC · JPL
383865	2008 QE_{45}	—	August 26, 2008	Socorro	LINEAR	·	1.8 km	MPC · JPL
383866	2008 QO_{45}	—	August 30, 2008	Socorro	LINEAR	·	2.9 km	MPC · JPL
383867	2008 RZ_{23}	—	August 30, 2008	Socorro	LINEAR	·	2.3 km	MPC · JPL
383868	2008 RK_{25}	—	September 5, 2008	Goodricke-Pigott	R. A. Tucker	·	1.4 km	MPC · JPL
383869	2008 RA_{26}	—	September 2, 2008	Dauban	Kugel, F.	·	1.5 km	MPC · JPL
383870	2008 RJ_{36}	—	September 2, 2008	Kitt Peak	Spacewatch	·	1.8 km	MPC · JPL
383871	2008 RF_{38}	—	September 2, 2008	Kitt Peak	Spacewatch	·	1.5 km	MPC · JPL
383872	2008 RO_{49}	—	February 7, 2006	Catalina	CSS	·	1.7 km	MPC · JPL
383873	2008 RZ_{50}	—	September 3, 2008	Kitt Peak	Spacewatch	·	1.7 km	MPC · JPL
383874	2008 RX_{62}	—	September 4, 2008	Kitt Peak	Spacewatch	·	1.0 km	MPC · JPL
383875	2008 RA_{64}	—	September 4, 2008	Kitt Peak	Spacewatch	·	1.7 km	MPC · JPL
383876	2008 RF_{75}	—	September 6, 2008	Catalina	CSS	·	2.4 km	MPC · JPL
383877	2008 RM_{96}	—	September 7, 2008	Mount Lemmon	Mount Lemmon Survey	·	1.7 km	MPC · JPL
383878	2008 RW_{100}	—	September 5, 2008	Kitt Peak	Spacewatch	HOF	2.4 km	MPC · JPL
383879	2008 RE_{108}	—	September 9, 2008	Kitt Peak	Spacewatch	·	1.8 km	MPC · JPL
383880	2008 RQ_{108}	—	September 10, 2008	Kitt Peak	Spacewatch	PAD	1.8 km	MPC · JPL
383881	2008 RO_{115}	—	September 7, 2008	Mount Lemmon	Mount Lemmon Survey	·	1.2 km	MPC · JPL
383882	2008 RJ_{129}	—	September 9, 2008	Mount Lemmon	Mount Lemmon Survey	·	2.1 km	MPC · JPL
383883	2008 RU_{136}	—	September 4, 2008	Kitt Peak	Spacewatch	·	2.3 km	MPC · JPL
383884	2008 RT_{137}	—	September 5, 2008	Kitt Peak	Spacewatch	·	2.5 km	MPC · JPL
383885	2008 RN_{139}	—	September 7, 2008	Mount Lemmon	Mount Lemmon Survey	·	1.5 km	MPC · JPL
383886	2008 RH_{140}	—	September 9, 2008	Catalina	CSS	·	1.6 km	MPC · JPL
383887	2008 RO_{142}	—	September 7, 2008	Socorro	LINEAR	·	2.6 km	MPC · JPL
383888	2008 RB_{146}	—	September 5, 2008	Socorro	LINEAR	DOR	3.4 km	MPC · JPL
383889	2008 SF_{1}	—	September 21, 2008	Grove Creek	Tozzi, F.	·	2.3 km	MPC · JPL
383890	2008 SM_{4}	—	August 22, 2008	Kitt Peak	Spacewatch	JUN	1.3 km	MPC · JPL
383891	2008 SV_{5}	—	September 22, 2008	Socorro	LINEAR	·	2.2 km	MPC · JPL
383892	2008 SK_{6}	—	September 22, 2008	Socorro	LINEAR	·	1.4 km	MPC · JPL
383893	2008 SR_{28}	—	September 4, 2008	Kitt Peak	Spacewatch	·	1.8 km	MPC · JPL
383894	2008 ST_{30}	—	September 20, 2008	Kitt Peak	Spacewatch	·	4.4 km	MPC · JPL
383895	2008 SG_{36}	—	September 20, 2008	Kitt Peak	Spacewatch	·	2.7 km	MPC · JPL
383896	2008 SA_{41}	—	September 20, 2008	Catalina	CSS	·	2.0 km	MPC · JPL
383897	2008 ST_{44}	—	September 20, 2008	Kitt Peak	Spacewatch	·	1.7 km	MPC · JPL
383898	2008 SQ_{45}	—	September 20, 2008	Kitt Peak	Spacewatch	·	1.7 km	MPC · JPL
383899	2008 SD_{47}	—	September 20, 2008	Kitt Peak	Spacewatch	·	1.5 km	MPC · JPL
383900	2008 SA_{52}	—	September 20, 2008	Mount Lemmon	Mount Lemmon Survey	·	1.8 km	MPC · JPL

== 383901–384000 ==
back to top

Designation			Discovery			Properties		Ref
Permanent	Provisional	Named after	Date	Site	Discoverer(s)	Category	Diam.	Ref
383901	2008 SN_{52}	—	September 20, 2008	Mount Lemmon	Mount Lemmon Survey	·	1.7 km	MPC · JPL
383902	2008 SC_{58}	—	September 20, 2008	Kitt Peak	Spacewatch	AEO	1.1 km	MPC · JPL
383903	2008 SV_{66}	—	September 21, 2008	Catalina	CSS	·	1.7 km	MPC · JPL
383904	2008 SD_{69}	—	September 4, 2008	Kitt Peak	Spacewatch	·	2.5 km	MPC · JPL
383905	2008 SQ_{72}	—	September 22, 2008	Kitt Peak	Spacewatch	·	1.3 km	MPC · JPL
383906	2008 ST_{75}	—	September 23, 2008	Mount Lemmon	Mount Lemmon Survey	·	1.5 km	MPC · JPL
383907	2008 SP_{79}	—	September 23, 2008	Mount Lemmon	Mount Lemmon Survey	·	2.1 km	MPC · JPL
383908	2008 SE_{84}	—	September 25, 2008	Dauban	Kugel, F.	·	1.7 km	MPC · JPL
383909	2008 SC_{88}	—	September 20, 2008	Catalina	CSS	(5)	1.4 km	MPC · JPL
383910	2008 SK_{91}	—	September 9, 2008	Mount Lemmon	Mount Lemmon Survey	(7744)	1.6 km	MPC · JPL
383911	2008 SN_{101}	—	September 21, 2008	Kitt Peak	Spacewatch	·	1.6 km	MPC · JPL
383912	2008 ST_{114}	—	September 22, 2008	Kitt Peak	Spacewatch	·	1.9 km	MPC · JPL
383913	2008 SP_{121}	—	September 22, 2008	Mount Lemmon	Mount Lemmon Survey	·	1.6 km	MPC · JPL
383914	2008 SX_{122}	—	September 22, 2008	Mount Lemmon	Mount Lemmon Survey	AGN	1.2 km	MPC · JPL
383915	2008 SZ_{125}	—	September 22, 2008	Mount Lemmon	Mount Lemmon Survey	·	2.5 km	MPC · JPL
383916	2008 SZ_{127}	—	September 22, 2008	Kitt Peak	Spacewatch	·	3.4 km	MPC · JPL
383917	2008 SG_{128}	—	September 22, 2008	Kitt Peak	Spacewatch	·	1.8 km	MPC · JPL
383918	2008 ST_{131}	—	September 22, 2008	Kitt Peak	Spacewatch	HOF	3.0 km	MPC · JPL
383919	2008 SX_{145}	—	September 22, 2008	Goodricke-Pigott	R. A. Tucker	·	2.7 km	MPC · JPL
383920	2008 SM_{147}	—	September 24, 2008	Bergisch Gladbach	W. Bickel	·	2.5 km	MPC · JPL
383921	2008 SM_{152}	—	September 24, 2008	Mount Lemmon	Mount Lemmon Survey	HNS	1.7 km	MPC · JPL
383922	2008 SO_{162}	—	September 28, 2008	Socorro	LINEAR	·	1.8 km	MPC · JPL
383923	2008 SE_{166}	—	September 28, 2008	Socorro	LINEAR	·	1.4 km	MPC · JPL
383924	2008 SJ_{167}	—	September 28, 2008	Socorro	LINEAR	·	2.0 km	MPC · JPL
383925	2008 SK_{173}	—	September 22, 2008	Catalina	CSS	BRG	1.4 km	MPC · JPL
383926	2008 SC_{174}	—	September 22, 2008	Catalina	CSS	·	2.1 km	MPC · JPL
383927	2008 SM_{175}	—	December 27, 2000	Kitt Peak	Spacewatch	·	1.8 km	MPC · JPL
383928	2008 SR_{188}	—	September 25, 2008	Kitt Peak	Spacewatch	(5)	1.2 km	MPC · JPL
383929	2008 ST_{192}	—	September 25, 2008	Kitt Peak	Spacewatch	·	1.7 km	MPC · JPL
383930	2008 SB_{194}	—	September 25, 2008	Kitt Peak	Spacewatch	·	1.8 km	MPC · JPL
383931	2008 SM_{199}	—	September 26, 2008	Kitt Peak	Spacewatch	GEF	1.2 km	MPC · JPL
383932	2008 SE_{200}	—	September 26, 2008	Kitt Peak	Spacewatch	·	2.0 km	MPC · JPL
383933	2008 SU_{201}	—	September 26, 2008	Kitt Peak	Spacewatch	AGN	1.2 km	MPC · JPL
383934	2008 SJ_{203}	—	September 26, 2008	Kitt Peak	Spacewatch	·	1.6 km	MPC · JPL
383935	2008 SA_{218}	—	September 30, 2008	Kitt Peak	Spacewatch	·	1.8 km	MPC · JPL
383936	2008 SW_{219}	—	November 1, 1999	Kitt Peak	Spacewatch	·	2.0 km	MPC · JPL
383937	2008 SP_{221}	—	September 25, 2008	Mount Lemmon	Mount Lemmon Survey	·	1.0 km	MPC · JPL
383938	2008 SU_{228}	—	December 15, 2004	Kitt Peak	Spacewatch	NEM	2.1 km	MPC · JPL
383939	2008 SV_{239}	—	September 21, 2008	Kitt Peak	Spacewatch	·	1.6 km	MPC · JPL
383940	2008 SO_{240}	—	September 29, 2008	Kitt Peak	Spacewatch	·	1.5 km	MPC · JPL
383941	2008 SL_{244}	—	September 26, 2008	Kitt Peak	Spacewatch	·	2.6 km	MPC · JPL
383942	2008 SZ_{258}	—	September 23, 2008	Catalina	CSS	·	2.1 km	MPC · JPL
383943	2008 SR_{260}	—	September 23, 2008	Catalina	CSS	EUN	1.6 km	MPC · JPL
383944	2008 SX_{263}	—	September 24, 2008	Mount Lemmon	Mount Lemmon Survey	·	3.4 km	MPC · JPL
383945	2008 ST_{268}	—	September 29, 2008	Catalina	CSS	(5)	1.8 km	MPC · JPL
383946	2008 SU_{268}	—	September 29, 2008	Catalina	CSS	·	2.3 km	MPC · JPL
383947	2008 SF_{272}	—	September 30, 2008	Mount Lemmon	Mount Lemmon Survey	·	2.0 km	MPC · JPL
383948	2008 SH_{274}	—	September 19, 2008	Kitt Peak	Spacewatch	·	2.6 km	MPC · JPL
383949	2008 SG_{281}	—	September 29, 2008	Mount Lemmon	Mount Lemmon Survey	AGN	1.3 km	MPC · JPL
383950	2008 SG_{286}	—	September 22, 2008	Kitt Peak	Spacewatch	LEO	1.8 km	MPC · JPL
383951	2008 SK_{306}	—	September 28, 2008	Mount Lemmon	Mount Lemmon Survey	·	1.8 km	MPC · JPL
383952	2008 SH_{307}	—	September 29, 2008	Mount Lemmon	Mount Lemmon Survey	·	2.3 km	MPC · JPL
383953	2008 TV	—	October 2, 2008	Great Shefford	Birtwhistle, P.	·	1.6 km	MPC · JPL
383954	2008 TG_{1}	—	October 1, 2008	Charleston	Astronomical Research Observatory	·	1.8 km	MPC · JPL
383955	2008 TE_{6}	—	September 22, 2008	Mount Lemmon	Mount Lemmon Survey	·	1.8 km	MPC · JPL
383956	2008 TA_{7}	—	October 3, 2008	La Sagra	OAM	AEO	1.2 km	MPC · JPL
383957	2008 TE_{8}	—	October 4, 2008	La Sagra	OAM	·	2.9 km	MPC · JPL
383958	2008 TL_{22}	—	October 1, 2008	Kitt Peak	Spacewatch	·	1.5 km	MPC · JPL
383959	2008 TP_{32}	—	October 1, 2008	Kitt Peak	Spacewatch	·	1.3 km	MPC · JPL
383960	2008 TM_{34}	—	October 1, 2008	Kitt Peak	Spacewatch	·	1.6 km	MPC · JPL
383961	2008 TD_{36}	—	October 1, 2008	Mount Lemmon	Mount Lemmon Survey	·	1.6 km	MPC · JPL
383962	2008 TH_{39}	—	October 1, 2008	Kitt Peak	Spacewatch	·	1.3 km	MPC · JPL
383963	2008 TC_{41}	—	October 1, 2008	Mount Lemmon	Mount Lemmon Survey	·	2.4 km	MPC · JPL
383964	2008 TP_{44}	—	October 1, 2008	Mount Lemmon	Mount Lemmon Survey	·	1.3 km	MPC · JPL
383965	2008 TE_{47}	—	October 1, 2008	Kitt Peak	Spacewatch	·	1.8 km	MPC · JPL
383966	2008 TQ_{51}	—	October 2, 2008	Kitt Peak	Spacewatch	·	1.5 km	MPC · JPL
383967	2008 TZ_{55}	—	October 2, 2008	Kitt Peak	Spacewatch	·	1.5 km	MPC · JPL
383968	2008 TT_{57}	—	October 2, 2008	Kitt Peak	Spacewatch	·	1.5 km	MPC · JPL
383969	2008 TU_{57}	—	October 2, 2008	Kitt Peak	Spacewatch	·	2.3 km	MPC · JPL
383970	2008 TU_{63}	—	October 2, 2008	Kitt Peak	Spacewatch	·	1.4 km	MPC · JPL
383971	2008 TC_{68}	—	October 2, 2008	Kitt Peak	Spacewatch	·	1.7 km	MPC · JPL
383972	2008 TF_{83}	—	October 3, 2008	Kitt Peak	Spacewatch	·	2.1 km	MPC · JPL
383973	2008 TL_{88}	—	October 3, 2008	Kitt Peak	Spacewatch	AGN	1.2 km	MPC · JPL
383974	2008 TA_{92}	—	September 23, 2008	Catalina	CSS	HNS	1.4 km	MPC · JPL
383975	2008 TM_{99}	—	September 24, 2008	Kitt Peak	Spacewatch	·	1.7 km	MPC · JPL
383976	2008 TP_{102}	—	October 6, 2008	Kitt Peak	Spacewatch	·	1.2 km	MPC · JPL
383977	2008 TK_{105}	—	October 6, 2008	Kitt Peak	Spacewatch	·	1.4 km	MPC · JPL
383978	2008 TK_{106}	—	October 6, 2008	Kitt Peak	Spacewatch	·	1.2 km	MPC · JPL
383979	2008 TO_{106}	—	September 20, 2008	Kitt Peak	Spacewatch	·	1.4 km	MPC · JPL
383980	2008 TB_{115}	—	October 6, 2008	Catalina	CSS	·	3.3 km	MPC · JPL
383981	2008 TS_{115}	—	October 6, 2008	Catalina	CSS	EUN	1.3 km	MPC · JPL
383982	2008 TJ_{116}	—	October 6, 2008	Catalina	CSS	·	2.0 km	MPC · JPL
383983	2008 TA_{122}	—	October 7, 2008	Catalina	CSS	·	1.8 km	MPC · JPL
383984	2008 TE_{122}	—	October 7, 2008	Catalina	CSS	615	1.4 km	MPC · JPL
383985	2008 TT_{130}	—	October 8, 2008	Mount Lemmon	Mount Lemmon Survey	·	2.1 km	MPC · JPL
383986	2008 TU_{132}	—	October 8, 2008	Mount Lemmon	Mount Lemmon Survey	·	1.5 km	MPC · JPL
383987	2008 TY_{139}	—	October 8, 2008	Mount Lemmon	Mount Lemmon Survey	·	2.0 km	MPC · JPL
383988	2008 TQ_{154}	—	October 9, 2008	Kitt Peak	Spacewatch	·	2.3 km	MPC · JPL
383989	2008 TX_{160}	—	October 2, 2008	Kitt Peak	Spacewatch	·	1.5 km	MPC · JPL
383990	2008 TA_{161}	—	October 6, 2008	Kitt Peak	Spacewatch	·	1.7 km	MPC · JPL
383991	2008 TP_{163}	—	October 1, 2008	Kitt Peak	Spacewatch	·	1.5 km	MPC · JPL
383992	2008 TJ_{165}	—	October 2, 2008	Mount Lemmon	Mount Lemmon Survey	·	1.8 km	MPC · JPL
383993	2008 TR_{165}	—	October 4, 2008	Mount Lemmon	Mount Lemmon Survey	·	1.7 km	MPC · JPL
383994	2008 TG_{166}	—	October 6, 2008	Mount Lemmon	Mount Lemmon Survey	·	1.6 km	MPC · JPL
383995	2008 TG_{169}	—	October 7, 2008	Kitt Peak	Spacewatch	·	1.6 km	MPC · JPL
383996	2008 TL_{180}	—	September 7, 2008	Catalina	CSS	·	2.6 km	MPC · JPL
383997	2008 UO_{2}	—	October 22, 2008	Goodricke-Pigott	R. A. Tucker	·	2.2 km	MPC · JPL
383998	2008 UH_{10}	—	October 17, 2008	Kitt Peak	Spacewatch	NEM	2.1 km	MPC · JPL
383999	2008 UR_{11}	—	October 17, 2008	Kitt Peak	Spacewatch	·	2.2 km	MPC · JPL
384000	2008 UJ_{13}	—	October 17, 2008	Kitt Peak	Spacewatch	·	2.7 km	MPC · JPL

back to top

== See also ==
- Meanings of minor-planet names: 383001–384000
