= List of minor planets: 386001–387000 =

The following is a partial list of minor planets, running from minor-planet number 386001 through 387000, inclusive. The primary data for this and other partial lists is based on JPL's "Small-Body Orbital Elements" and data available from the Minor Planet Center. Critical list information is also provided by the MPC, unless otherwise specified from Lowell Observatory. A detailed description of the table's columns and additional sources are given on the main page including a complete list of every page in this series, and a statistical break-up on the dynamical classification of minor planets.

Also see the summary list of all named bodies in numerical and alphabetical order, and the corresponding naming citations for the number range of this particular list. New namings may only be added to this list after official publication, as the preannouncement of names is condemned by the Working Group for Small Bodies Nomenclature of the International Astronomical Union.

Near-Earth obj.	MBA (inner)	MBA (outer)	Centaur
Mars-crosser	MBA (middle)	Jupiter trojan	Trans-Neptunian obj.
Unclassified

== 386001–386100 ==
Designation			Discovery			Properties		Ref
Permanent	Provisional	Named after	Date	Site	Discoverer(s)	Category	Diam.	Ref
386001	2007 CG_{56}	—	February 15, 2007	Catalina	CSS	·	770 m	MPC · JPL
386002	2007 CA_{60}	—	February 10, 2007	Catalina	CSS	·	950 m	MPC · JPL
386003	2007 CU_{70}	—	February 14, 2007	Mauna Kea	Mauna Kea	·	1.6 km	MPC · JPL
386004	2007 DM_{4}	—	February 16, 2007	Mount Lemmon	Mount Lemmon Survey	·	1.5 km	MPC · JPL
386005	2007 DT_{5}	—	February 17, 2007	Kitt Peak	Spacewatch	·	780 m	MPC · JPL
386006	2007 DQ_{14}	—	January 29, 2007	Mount Lemmon	Mount Lemmon Survey	V	490 m	MPC · JPL
386007	2007 DN_{22}	—	February 17, 2007	Kitt Peak	Spacewatch	·	880 m	MPC · JPL
386008	2007 DL_{24}	—	February 17, 2007	Kitt Peak	Spacewatch	·	1.7 km	MPC · JPL
386009	2007 DQ_{26}	—	February 17, 2007	Kitt Peak	Spacewatch	·	940 m	MPC · JPL
386010	2007 DN_{30}	—	February 17, 2007	Kitt Peak	Spacewatch	·	840 m	MPC · JPL
386011	2007 DZ_{30}	—	February 17, 2007	Kitt Peak	Spacewatch	·	620 m	MPC · JPL
386012	2007 DB_{31}	—	February 17, 2007	Kitt Peak	Spacewatch	MAS	700 m	MPC · JPL
386013	2007 DY_{34}	—	February 17, 2007	Kitt Peak	Spacewatch	MAS	650 m	MPC · JPL
386014	2007 DR_{47}	—	February 21, 2007	Mount Lemmon	Mount Lemmon Survey	·	1.2 km	MPC · JPL
386015	2007 DY_{51}	—	February 17, 2007	Mount Lemmon	Mount Lemmon Survey	·	900 m	MPC · JPL
386016	2007 DV_{52}	—	February 19, 2007	Mount Lemmon	Mount Lemmon Survey	·	840 m	MPC · JPL
386017	2007 DV_{66}	—	February 21, 2007	Kitt Peak	Spacewatch	·	920 m	MPC · JPL
386018	2007 DE_{85}	—	February 19, 2007	Catalina	CSS	PHO	1.4 km	MPC · JPL
386019	2007 DA_{88}	—	February 23, 2007	Kitt Peak	Spacewatch	·	860 m	MPC · JPL
386020	2007 DH_{92}	—	February 23, 2007	Kitt Peak	Spacewatch	·	1.3 km	MPC · JPL
386021	2007 DJ_{97}	—	February 23, 2007	Kitt Peak	Spacewatch	·	960 m	MPC · JPL
386022	2007 DJ_{109}	—	February 23, 2007	Mount Lemmon	Mount Lemmon Survey	·	830 m	MPC · JPL
386023	2007 DX_{112}	—	February 17, 2007	Kitt Peak	Spacewatch	·	870 m	MPC · JPL
386024	2007 DU_{113}	—	February 23, 2007	Mount Lemmon	Mount Lemmon Survey	·	830 m	MPC · JPL
386025	2007 EV_{6}	—	February 21, 2007	Mount Lemmon	Mount Lemmon Survey	·	960 m	MPC · JPL
386026	2007 EB_{11}	—	March 9, 2007	Kitt Peak	Spacewatch	NYS	730 m	MPC · JPL
386027	2007 ED_{23}	—	March 10, 2007	Mount Lemmon	Mount Lemmon Survey	·	1.2 km	MPC · JPL
386028	2007 EG_{23}	—	March 10, 2007	Mount Lemmon	Mount Lemmon Survey	·	1.0 km	MPC · JPL
386029	2007 EK_{23}	—	March 10, 2007	Mount Lemmon	Mount Lemmon Survey	L5	8.7 km	MPC · JPL
386030	2007 EO_{25}	—	March 10, 2007	Mount Lemmon	Mount Lemmon Survey	NYS	1.1 km	MPC · JPL
386031	2007 EY_{26}	—	March 12, 2007	Kleť	Kleť	·	1.3 km	MPC · JPL
386032	2007 EH_{27}	—	March 12, 2007	Altschwendt	W. Ries	·	1.0 km	MPC · JPL
386033	2007 ES_{31}	—	March 10, 2007	Kitt Peak	Spacewatch	NYS	890 m	MPC · JPL
386034	2007 EM_{39}	—	March 12, 2007	Calvin-Rehoboth	Calvin College	·	950 m	MPC · JPL
386035	2007 ER_{41}	—	March 9, 2007	Mount Lemmon	Mount Lemmon Survey	·	800 m	MPC · JPL
386036	2007 EF_{46}	—	March 9, 2007	Mount Lemmon	Mount Lemmon Survey	·	1.2 km	MPC · JPL
386037	2007 ED_{59}	—	February 22, 2007	Kitt Peak	Spacewatch	·	910 m	MPC · JPL
386038	2007 EH_{71}	—	March 10, 2007	Kitt Peak	Spacewatch	·	1.1 km	MPC · JPL
386039	2007 EX_{74}	—	March 10, 2007	Kitt Peak	Spacewatch	NYS	1.2 km	MPC · JPL
386040	2007 EP_{96}	—	March 10, 2007	Mount Lemmon	Mount Lemmon Survey	·	1.2 km	MPC · JPL
386041	2007 EZ_{96}	—	March 10, 2007	Mount Lemmon	Mount Lemmon Survey	·	1.2 km	MPC · JPL
386042	2007 EB_{97}	—	March 10, 2007	Mount Lemmon	Mount Lemmon Survey	MAS	730 m	MPC · JPL
386043	2007 ED_{111}	—	March 11, 2007	Kitt Peak	Spacewatch	MAS	890 m	MPC · JPL
386044	2007 EW_{129}	—	March 9, 2007	Mount Lemmon	Mount Lemmon Survey	·	1.2 km	MPC · JPL
386045	2007 ET_{162}	—	March 15, 2007	Mount Lemmon	Mount Lemmon Survey	·	1.8 km	MPC · JPL
386046	2007 EP_{180}	—	March 14, 2007	Mount Lemmon	Mount Lemmon Survey	NYS	1.2 km	MPC · JPL
386047	2007 EO_{197}	—	March 15, 2007	Kitt Peak	Spacewatch	·	1.1 km	MPC · JPL
386048	2007 EQ_{217}	—	February 25, 2007	Mount Lemmon	Mount Lemmon Survey	CLA	1.5 km	MPC · JPL
386049	2007 ET_{220}	—	March 11, 2007	Mount Lemmon	Mount Lemmon Survey	·	1.2 km	MPC · JPL
386050	2007 EV_{222}	—	March 12, 2007	Kitt Peak	Spacewatch	·	1.7 km	MPC · JPL
386051	2007 FV_{7}	—	March 16, 2007	Mount Lemmon	Mount Lemmon Survey	MAS	660 m	MPC · JPL
386052	2007 FY_{23}	—	March 20, 2007	Kitt Peak	Spacewatch	MAS	750 m	MPC · JPL
386053	2007 FL_{30}	—	March 20, 2007	Mount Lemmon	Mount Lemmon Survey	MAS	770 m	MPC · JPL
386054	2007 FE_{32}	—	March 20, 2007	Kitt Peak	Spacewatch	V	980 m	MPC · JPL
386055	2007 FQ_{35}	—	March 20, 2007	Catalina	CSS	·	2.1 km	MPC · JPL
386056 Tauragė	2007 FV_{35}	Tauragė	March 24, 2007	Moletai	K. Černis	NYS	1.2 km	MPC · JPL
386057	2007 FH_{37}	—	March 26, 2007	Mount Lemmon	Mount Lemmon Survey	NYS	1.2 km	MPC · JPL
386058	2007 FF_{47}	—	March 20, 2007	Mount Lemmon	Mount Lemmon Survey	NYS	1.2 km	MPC · JPL
386059	2007 FP_{47}	—	March 26, 2007	Kitt Peak	Spacewatch	·	1.2 km	MPC · JPL
386060	2007 GD_{8}	—	April 7, 2007	Mount Lemmon	Mount Lemmon Survey	·	1.8 km	MPC · JPL
386061	2007 GP_{36}	—	April 14, 2007	Kitt Peak	Spacewatch	·	1.5 km	MPC · JPL
386062	2007 GF_{37}	—	February 26, 2007	Mount Lemmon	Mount Lemmon Survey	·	1.2 km	MPC · JPL
386063	2007 GK_{37}	—	April 14, 2007	Kitt Peak	Spacewatch	NYS	1.3 km	MPC · JPL
386064	2007 GA_{50}	—	April 15, 2007	Catalina	CSS	·	1.3 km	MPC · JPL
386065	2007 GW_{50}	—	April 15, 2007	Catalina	CSS	·	1.5 km	MPC · JPL
386066	2007 HJ_{6}	—	April 16, 2007	Catalina	CSS	NYS	1.3 km	MPC · JPL
386067	2007 HX_{23}	—	October 1, 2005	Mount Lemmon	Mount Lemmon Survey	·	1.0 km	MPC · JPL
386068	2007 HO_{30}	—	April 19, 2007	Mount Lemmon	Mount Lemmon Survey	MAS	660 m	MPC · JPL
386069	2007 HD_{33}	—	April 19, 2007	Mount Lemmon	Mount Lemmon Survey	·	1.0 km	MPC · JPL
386070	2007 HQ_{35}	—	April 11, 2007	Mount Lemmon	Mount Lemmon Survey	EOS	2.1 km	MPC · JPL
386071	2007 HS_{35}	—	October 15, 2004	Anderson Mesa	LONEOS	·	2.3 km	MPC · JPL
386072	2007 HW_{39}	—	April 20, 2007	Mount Lemmon	Mount Lemmon Survey	·	1.3 km	MPC · JPL
386073	2007 HK_{50}	—	April 20, 2007	Kitt Peak	Spacewatch	·	1.0 km	MPC · JPL
386074	2007 HN_{63}	—	October 25, 2005	Mount Lemmon	Mount Lemmon Survey	NYS	1.3 km	MPC · JPL
386075	2007 HB_{91}	—	March 26, 2007	Mount Lemmon	Mount Lemmon Survey	·	1.4 km	MPC · JPL
386076	2007 JG_{7}	—	May 9, 2007	Mount Lemmon	Mount Lemmon Survey	·	1.1 km	MPC · JPL
386077	2007 JA_{17}	—	May 7, 2007	Kitt Peak	Spacewatch	NYS	1.5 km	MPC · JPL
386078	2007 JD_{18}	—	April 25, 2007	Mount Lemmon	Mount Lemmon Survey	·	2.8 km	MPC · JPL
386079	2007 JM_{24}	—	May 9, 2007	Kitt Peak	Spacewatch	·	1.3 km	MPC · JPL
386080	2007 JA_{44}	—	May 6, 2007	Purple Mountain	PMO NEO Survey Program	·	1.1 km	MPC · JPL
386081	2007 KH_{1}	—	May 17, 2007	Kitt Peak	Spacewatch	NYS	1.3 km	MPC · JPL
386082	2007 LR_{8}	—	May 11, 2007	Mount Lemmon	Mount Lemmon Survey	·	1.4 km	MPC · JPL
386083	2007 LL_{12}	—	June 9, 2007	Kitt Peak	Spacewatch	·	1.2 km	MPC · JPL
386084	2007 LK_{24}	—	June 14, 2007	Kitt Peak	Spacewatch	MAS	780 m	MPC · JPL
386085	2007 LY_{37}	—	June 11, 2007	Siding Spring	SSS	·	1.8 km	MPC · JPL
386086	2007 OL_{1}	—	January 28, 2006	Mount Lemmon	Mount Lemmon Survey	·	1.8 km	MPC · JPL
386087	2007 OD_{3}	—	July 21, 2007	Wrightwood	J. W. Young	·	2.3 km	MPC · JPL
386088	2007 OD_{7}	—	July 24, 2007	Reedy Creek	J. Broughton	·	2.1 km	MPC · JPL
386089	2007 OD_{8}	—	July 25, 2007	Lulin	LUSS	·	2.1 km	MPC · JPL
386090	2007 OU_{10}	—	July 20, 2007	Lulin	LUSS	·	2.7 km	MPC · JPL
386091	2007 PV_{2}	—	August 7, 2007	Reedy Creek	J. Broughton	·	2.0 km	MPC · JPL
386092	2007 PO_{9}	—	August 12, 2007	Great Shefford	Birtwhistle, P.	·	1.6 km	MPC · JPL
386093	2007 PG_{13}	—	August 8, 2007	Socorro	LINEAR	·	2.5 km	MPC · JPL
386094	2007 PN_{26}	—	August 12, 2007	Socorro	LINEAR	H	740 m	MPC · JPL
386095	2007 PJ_{33}	—	August 10, 2007	Kitt Peak	Spacewatch	MRX	1.1 km	MPC · JPL
386096	2007 PR_{44}	—	August 7, 2007	Palomar	M. E. Schwamb, M. E. Brown	·	2.1 km	MPC · JPL
386097	2007 PV_{49}	—	August 10, 2007	Kitt Peak	Spacewatch	·	1.8 km	MPC · JPL
386098	2007 PY_{49}	—	August 10, 2007	Kitt Peak	Spacewatch	AGN	1.0 km	MPC · JPL
386099	2007 QC_{1}	—	August 13, 2007	Anderson Mesa	LONEOS	DOR	3.2 km	MPC · JPL
386100	2007 QT_{10}	—	August 10, 2007	Kitt Peak	Spacewatch	WIT	1.3 km	MPC · JPL

== 386101–386200 ==
back to top

Designation			Discovery			Properties		Ref
Permanent	Provisional	Named after	Date	Site	Discoverer(s)	Category	Diam.	Ref
386101	2007 RP_{30}	—	September 5, 2007	Anderson Mesa	LONEOS	·	4.6 km	MPC · JPL
386102	2007 RL_{39}	—	September 8, 2007	Andrushivka	Andrushivka	·	1.8 km	MPC · JPL
386103	2007 RZ_{40}	—	September 9, 2007	Anderson Mesa	LONEOS	H	790 m	MPC · JPL
386104	2007 RW_{59}	—	August 16, 2007	XuYi	PMO NEO Survey Program	·	2.2 km	MPC · JPL
386105	2007 RF_{102}	—	September 11, 2007	Catalina	CSS	·	2.0 km	MPC · JPL
386106	2007 RF_{109}	—	September 11, 2007	Kitt Peak	Spacewatch	·	2.2 km	MPC · JPL
386107	2007 RF_{117}	—	September 11, 2007	Kitt Peak	Spacewatch	·	2.1 km	MPC · JPL
386108	2007 RV_{123}	—	September 12, 2007	Catalina	CSS	·	3.5 km	MPC · JPL
386109	2007 RO_{128}	—	September 12, 2007	Mount Lemmon	Mount Lemmon Survey	NEM	2.4 km	MPC · JPL
386110	2007 RY_{130}	—	September 12, 2007	Mount Lemmon	Mount Lemmon Survey	·	2.0 km	MPC · JPL
386111	2007 RS_{135}	—	September 13, 2007	Kitt Peak	Spacewatch	·	3.1 km	MPC · JPL
386112	2007 RQ_{139}	—	September 13, 2007	Socorro	LINEAR	·	1.6 km	MPC · JPL
386113	2007 RJ_{148}	—	September 11, 2007	Purple Mountain	PMO NEO Survey Program	H	640 m	MPC · JPL
386114	2007 RA_{169}	—	September 10, 2007	Kitt Peak	Spacewatch	KOR	1.4 km	MPC · JPL
386115	2007 RO_{170}	—	September 10, 2007	Kitt Peak	Spacewatch	·	1.9 km	MPC · JPL
386116	2007 RH_{172}	—	September 10, 2007	Kitt Peak	Spacewatch	KOR	1.2 km	MPC · JPL
386117	2007 RX_{178}	—	November 30, 2003	Kitt Peak	Spacewatch	AGN	1.4 km	MPC · JPL
386118	2007 RB_{220}	—	September 14, 2007	Mount Lemmon	Mount Lemmon Survey	·	2.5 km	MPC · JPL
386119	2007 RU_{227}	—	September 10, 2007	Mount Lemmon	Mount Lemmon Survey	·	4.8 km	MPC · JPL
386120	2007 RO_{238}	—	September 14, 2007	Kitt Peak	Spacewatch	·	1.6 km	MPC · JPL
386121	2007 RC_{262}	—	September 14, 2007	Kitt Peak	Spacewatch	·	1.7 km	MPC · JPL
386122	2007 RD_{285}	—	September 12, 2007	Mount Lemmon	Mount Lemmon Survey	AGN	1.1 km	MPC · JPL
386123	2007 RD_{286}	—	September 2, 2007	Mount Lemmon	Mount Lemmon Survey	H	630 m	MPC · JPL
386124	2007 RU_{294}	—	September 14, 2007	Mount Lemmon	Mount Lemmon Survey	·	2.2 km	MPC · JPL
386125	2007 RV_{299}	—	September 13, 2007	Catalina	CSS	·	1.6 km	MPC · JPL
386126	2007 RV_{307}	—	September 9, 2007	Kitt Peak	Spacewatch	·	2.1 km	MPC · JPL
386127	2007 RQ_{322}	—	September 13, 2007	Socorro	LINEAR	·	2.5 km	MPC · JPL
386128	2007 RM_{325}	—	September 15, 2007	Mount Lemmon	Mount Lemmon Survey	·	2.5 km	MPC · JPL
386129	2007 SG_{24}	—	September 18, 2007	Mount Lemmon	Mount Lemmon Survey	·	2.5 km	MPC · JPL
386130	2007 TO_{10}	—	September 14, 2007	Mount Lemmon	Mount Lemmon Survey	·	2.8 km	MPC · JPL
386131	2007 TJ_{21}	—	September 13, 2007	Mount Lemmon	Mount Lemmon Survey	·	1.5 km	MPC · JPL
386132	2007 TQ_{39}	—	October 6, 2007	Kitt Peak	Spacewatch	·	2.1 km	MPC · JPL
386133	2007 TF_{41}	—	October 6, 2007	Kitt Peak	Spacewatch	EOS	1.6 km	MPC · JPL
386134	2007 TL_{61}	—	October 7, 2007	Mount Lemmon	Mount Lemmon Survey	EOS	1.6 km	MPC · JPL
386135	2007 TC_{81}	—	September 11, 2007	Mount Lemmon	Mount Lemmon Survey	·	1.8 km	MPC · JPL
386136	2007 TH_{91}	—	October 8, 2007	Purple Mountain	PMO NEO Survey Program	·	3.7 km	MPC · JPL
386137	2007 TV_{92}	—	October 6, 2007	Kitt Peak	Spacewatch	·	2.3 km	MPC · JPL
386138	2007 TU_{93}	—	October 6, 2007	Kitt Peak	Spacewatch	·	2.5 km	MPC · JPL
386139	2007 TV_{106}	—	October 4, 2007	Kitt Peak	Spacewatch	KOR	1.4 km	MPC · JPL
386140	2007 TC_{115}	—	October 8, 2007	Anderson Mesa	LONEOS	·	3.6 km	MPC · JPL
386141	2007 TV_{132}	—	October 7, 2007	Mount Lemmon	Mount Lemmon Survey	·	1.4 km	MPC · JPL
386142	2007 TC_{158}	—	October 11, 2007	Catalina	CSS	·	2.2 km	MPC · JPL
386143	2007 TH_{159}	—	October 9, 2007	Socorro	LINEAR	·	2.2 km	MPC · JPL
386144	2007 TT_{161}	—	October 11, 2007	Socorro	LINEAR	·	1.8 km	MPC · JPL
386145	2007 TU_{168}	—	October 5, 2007	Kitt Peak	Spacewatch	·	2.8 km	MPC · JPL
386146	2007 TM_{188}	—	October 4, 2007	Kitt Peak	Spacewatch	·	1.4 km	MPC · JPL
386147	2007 TM_{191}	—	October 4, 2007	Mount Lemmon	Mount Lemmon Survey	·	2.5 km	MPC · JPL
386148	2007 TE_{196}	—	October 7, 2007	Mount Lemmon	Mount Lemmon Survey	THM	2.3 km	MPC · JPL
386149	2007 TD_{245}	—	October 8, 2007	Catalina	CSS	·	2.3 km	MPC · JPL
386150	2007 TF_{256}	—	October 10, 2007	Kitt Peak	Spacewatch	·	1.6 km	MPC · JPL
386151	2007 TD_{271}	—	October 9, 2007	Kitt Peak	Spacewatch	·	1.5 km	MPC · JPL
386152	2007 TP_{292}	—	October 8, 2007	Mount Lemmon	Mount Lemmon Survey	KOR	1.1 km	MPC · JPL
386153	2007 TB_{302}	—	October 12, 2007	Kitt Peak	Spacewatch	·	1.8 km	MPC · JPL
386154	2007 TN_{316}	—	October 6, 2007	Kitt Peak	Spacewatch	·	1.5 km	MPC · JPL
386155	2007 TF_{320}	—	October 13, 2007	Kitt Peak	Spacewatch	·	1.8 km	MPC · JPL
386156	2007 TV_{326}	—	September 25, 2007	Mount Lemmon	Mount Lemmon Survey	·	2.2 km	MPC · JPL
386157	2007 TC_{366}	—	September 13, 2007	Catalina	CSS	·	2.7 km	MPC · JPL
386158	2007 TH_{366}	—	October 9, 2007	Catalina	CSS	·	2.7 km	MPC · JPL
386159	2007 TB_{372}	—	October 13, 2007	Catalina	CSS	·	2.0 km	MPC · JPL
386160	2007 TL_{373}	—	October 14, 2007	Kitt Peak	Spacewatch	·	2.5 km	MPC · JPL
386161	2007 TU_{377}	—	October 11, 2007	Kitt Peak	Spacewatch	·	2.0 km	MPC · JPL
386162	2007 TM_{399}	—	October 15, 2007	Kitt Peak	Spacewatch	·	2.0 km	MPC · JPL
386163	2007 TR_{433}	—	October 11, 2007	Catalina	CSS	·	2.5 km	MPC · JPL
386164	2007 TE_{439}	—	October 12, 2007	Kitt Peak	Spacewatch	·	1.6 km	MPC · JPL
386165	2007 TO_{444}	—	October 12, 2007	Mount Lemmon	Mount Lemmon Survey	·	2.4 km	MPC · JPL
386166	2007 TA_{449}	—	October 9, 2007	Kitt Peak	Spacewatch	·	3.5 km	MPC · JPL
386167	2007 UL_{3}	—	October 16, 2007	Andrushivka	Andrushivka	·	3.5 km	MPC · JPL
386168	2007 UH_{24}	—	October 8, 2007	Mount Lemmon	Mount Lemmon Survey	KOR	1.4 km	MPC · JPL
386169	2007 UX_{48}	—	October 20, 2007	Mount Lemmon	Mount Lemmon Survey	·	2.8 km	MPC · JPL
386170	2007 UE_{64}	—	March 12, 2005	Kitt Peak	Spacewatch	·	1.9 km	MPC · JPL
386171	2007 UK_{79}	—	October 10, 2007	Mount Lemmon	Mount Lemmon Survey	·	2.0 km	MPC · JPL
386172	2007 UK_{82}	—	October 30, 2007	Kitt Peak	Spacewatch	KOR	1.4 km	MPC · JPL
386173	2007 UD_{89}	—	October 12, 2007	Kitt Peak	Spacewatch	·	1.4 km	MPC · JPL
386174	2007 UY_{103}	—	October 30, 2007	Kitt Peak	Spacewatch	·	2.4 km	MPC · JPL
386175	2007 UJ_{115}	—	October 31, 2007	Kitt Peak	Spacewatch	EMA	5.1 km	MPC · JPL
386176	2007 UV_{124}	—	September 15, 2007	Mount Lemmon	Mount Lemmon Survey	·	2.2 km	MPC · JPL
386177	2007 UE_{137}	—	October 16, 2007	Kitt Peak	Spacewatch	EOS	1.9 km	MPC · JPL
386178	2007 UU_{137}	—	October 18, 2007	Kitt Peak	Spacewatch	·	2.8 km	MPC · JPL
386179	2007 VT_{50}	—	October 16, 2007	Mount Lemmon	Mount Lemmon Survey	EOS	2.2 km	MPC · JPL
386180	2007 VQ_{53}	—	November 1, 2007	Kitt Peak	Spacewatch	·	1.7 km	MPC · JPL
386181	2007 VH_{60}	—	October 18, 2007	Kitt Peak	Spacewatch	NAE	3.2 km	MPC · JPL
386182	2007 VH_{66}	—	November 2, 2007	Kitt Peak	Spacewatch	·	2.2 km	MPC · JPL
386183	2007 VD_{79}	—	October 8, 2007	Kitt Peak	Spacewatch	·	1.9 km	MPC · JPL
386184	2007 VA_{89}	—	November 3, 2007	Socorro	LINEAR	AEG	3.4 km	MPC · JPL
386185	2007 VH_{89}	—	November 4, 2007	Socorro	LINEAR	·	2.6 km	MPC · JPL
386186	2007 VT_{96}	—	November 1, 2007	Kitt Peak	Spacewatch	·	2.1 km	MPC · JPL
386187	2007 VC_{107}	—	November 3, 2007	Kitt Peak	Spacewatch	·	2.0 km	MPC · JPL
386188	2007 VB_{120}	—	November 5, 2007	Kitt Peak	Spacewatch	·	1.9 km	MPC · JPL
386189	2007 VM_{135}	—	November 3, 2007	Mount Lemmon	Mount Lemmon Survey	TRE	3.2 km	MPC · JPL
386190	2007 VD_{142}	—	October 20, 2007	Mount Lemmon	Mount Lemmon Survey	·	1.9 km	MPC · JPL
386191	2007 VY_{142}	—	November 4, 2007	Kitt Peak	Spacewatch	·	2.5 km	MPC · JPL
386192	2007 VU_{150}	—	November 7, 2007	Kitt Peak	Spacewatch	EOS	1.7 km	MPC · JPL
386193	2007 VO_{154}	—	October 9, 2007	Kitt Peak	Spacewatch	·	2.3 km	MPC · JPL
386194	2007 VQ_{196}	—	November 7, 2007	Mount Lemmon	Mount Lemmon Survey	·	1.5 km	MPC · JPL
386195	2007 VA_{211}	—	November 9, 2007	Kitt Peak	Spacewatch	·	4.9 km	MPC · JPL
386196	2007 VS_{215}	—	November 9, 2007	Kitt Peak	Spacewatch	·	2.4 km	MPC · JPL
386197	2007 VW_{217}	—	November 9, 2007	Kitt Peak	Spacewatch	·	3.0 km	MPC · JPL
386198	2007 VG_{230}	—	November 7, 2007	Kitt Peak	Spacewatch	THM	1.9 km	MPC · JPL
386199	2007 VM_{253}	—	October 7, 2007	Catalina	CSS	·	2.5 km	MPC · JPL
386200	2007 VE_{263}	—	November 1, 2007	Kitt Peak	Spacewatch	·	3.0 km	MPC · JPL

== 386201–386300 ==
back to top

Designation			Discovery			Properties		Ref
Permanent	Provisional	Named after	Date	Site	Discoverer(s)	Category	Diam.	Ref
386201	2007 VU_{269}	—	November 3, 2007	Kitt Peak	Spacewatch	EOS	2.2 km	MPC · JPL
386202	2007 VR_{287}	—	November 2, 2007	Kitt Peak	Spacewatch	EOS	2.0 km	MPC · JPL
386203	2007 VA_{288}	—	November 2, 2007	Kitt Peak	Spacewatch	NAE	2.8 km	MPC · JPL
386204	2007 VP_{289}	—	November 13, 2007	Mount Lemmon	Mount Lemmon Survey	·	4.5 km	MPC · JPL
386205	2007 VC_{298}	—	November 11, 2007	Catalina	CSS	·	5.1 km	MPC · JPL
386206	2007 VL_{308}	—	November 6, 2007	Kitt Peak	Spacewatch	·	1.9 km	MPC · JPL
386207	2007 VH_{321}	—	November 8, 2007	Kitt Peak	Spacewatch	·	2.9 km	MPC · JPL
386208	2007 VA_{326}	—	November 18, 2007	Lulin	LUSS	·	3.0 km	MPC · JPL
386209	2007 VB_{327}	—	November 5, 2007	Kitt Peak	Spacewatch	EOS	2.3 km	MPC · JPL
386210	2007 VZ_{328}	—	November 12, 2007	Mount Lemmon	Mount Lemmon Survey	EOS	1.7 km	MPC · JPL
386211	2007 VC_{329}	—	November 12, 2007	Mount Lemmon	Mount Lemmon Survey	EOS	2.0 km	MPC · JPL
386212	2007 VE_{329}	—	November 12, 2007	Mount Lemmon	Mount Lemmon Survey	·	4.6 km	MPC · JPL
386213	2007 WF_{2}	—	November 16, 2007	Charleston	Astronomical Research Observatory	THB	2.6 km	MPC · JPL
386214	2007 WB_{4}	—	September 18, 2007	Mount Lemmon	Mount Lemmon Survey	·	2.6 km	MPC · JPL
386215	2007 WO_{6}	—	November 17, 2007	Socorro	LINEAR	·	5.1 km	MPC · JPL
386216	2007 WW_{34}	—	November 19, 2007	Mount Lemmon	Mount Lemmon Survey	·	3.0 km	MPC · JPL
386217	2007 WZ_{40}	—	November 2, 2007	Kitt Peak	Spacewatch	·	1.4 km	MPC · JPL
386218	2007 WJ_{50}	—	November 20, 2007	Mount Lemmon	Mount Lemmon Survey	EOS	2.4 km	MPC · JPL
386219	2007 WX_{58}	—	November 19, 2007	Kitt Peak	Spacewatch	·	2.3 km	MPC · JPL
386220	2007 WL_{62}	—	November 18, 2007	Kitt Peak	Spacewatch	·	2.8 km	MPC · JPL
386221	2007 XQ_{19}	—	December 12, 2007	Socorro	LINEAR	·	3.1 km	MPC · JPL
386222	2007 XS_{39}	—	November 12, 2007	Mount Lemmon	Mount Lemmon Survey	·	4.0 km	MPC · JPL
386223	2007 XY_{44}	—	December 4, 2007	Kitt Peak	Spacewatch	·	2.7 km	MPC · JPL
386224	2007 YY_{2}	—	December 18, 2007	Bergisch Gladbach	W. Bickel	EUP	3.7 km	MPC · JPL
386225	2007 YB_{12}	—	December 17, 2007	Mount Lemmon	Mount Lemmon Survey	·	2.4 km	MPC · JPL
386226	2007 YN_{34}	—	December 20, 2007	Kitt Peak	Spacewatch	·	2.1 km	MPC · JPL
386227	2007 YB_{37}	—	November 3, 2007	Mount Lemmon	Mount Lemmon Survey	·	3.5 km	MPC · JPL
386228	2007 YK_{41}	—	December 30, 2007	Kitt Peak	Spacewatch	·	4.1 km	MPC · JPL
386229	2007 YW_{42}	—	December 5, 2007	Kitt Peak	Spacewatch	EOS	2.2 km	MPC · JPL
386230	2007 YQ_{45}	—	December 30, 2007	Mount Lemmon	Mount Lemmon Survey	·	4.1 km	MPC · JPL
386231	2007 YE_{49}	—	December 28, 2007	Kitt Peak	Spacewatch	VER	3.6 km	MPC · JPL
386232	2007 YD_{63}	—	December 31, 2007	Mount Lemmon	Mount Lemmon Survey	·	3.9 km	MPC · JPL
386233	2007 YE_{72}	—	December 18, 2007	Mount Lemmon	Mount Lemmon Survey	VER	3.1 km	MPC · JPL
386234	2008 AO_{6}	—	November 6, 2007	Kitt Peak	Spacewatch	·	2.7 km	MPC · JPL
386235	2008 AX_{6}	—	January 10, 2008	Mount Lemmon	Mount Lemmon Survey	·	3.4 km	MPC · JPL
386236	2008 AX_{8}	—	January 10, 2008	Kitt Peak	Spacewatch	·	2.4 km	MPC · JPL
386237	2008 AM_{13}	—	January 10, 2008	Mount Lemmon	Mount Lemmon Survey	VER	3.2 km	MPC · JPL
386238	2008 AC_{37}	—	January 10, 2008	Kitt Peak	Spacewatch	·	4.8 km	MPC · JPL
386239	2008 AR_{49}	—	January 11, 2008	Kitt Peak	Spacewatch	·	3.1 km	MPC · JPL
386240	2008 AU_{58}	—	November 12, 2007	Mount Lemmon	Mount Lemmon Survey	·	4.0 km	MPC · JPL
386241	2008 AR_{59}	—	December 31, 2007	Kitt Peak	Spacewatch	·	3.5 km	MPC · JPL
386242	2008 AH_{72}	—	January 14, 2008	Kitt Peak	Spacewatch	·	3.4 km	MPC · JPL
386243	2008 AO_{87}	—	December 15, 2007	Mount Lemmon	Mount Lemmon Survey	URS	3.8 km	MPC · JPL
386244	2008 AA_{92}	—	January 14, 2008	Kitt Peak	Spacewatch	LIX	4.1 km	MPC · JPL
386245	2008 AZ_{92}	—	January 14, 2008	Kitt Peak	Spacewatch	·	3.5 km	MPC · JPL
386246	2008 AP_{117}	—	January 14, 2008	Kitt Peak	Spacewatch	·	4.1 km	MPC · JPL
386247	2008 AS_{134}	—	January 16, 2008	Mount Lemmon	Mount Lemmon Survey	·	2.9 km	MPC · JPL
386248	2008 AV_{134}	—	January 10, 2008	Catalina	CSS	·	3.4 km	MPC · JPL
386249	2008 BL_{13}	—	January 19, 2008	Mount Lemmon	Mount Lemmon Survey	EUP	4.2 km	MPC · JPL
386250	2008 CS_{8}	—	February 2, 2008	Mount Lemmon	Mount Lemmon Survey	LUT	5.4 km	MPC · JPL
386251	2008 CN_{12}	—	February 3, 2008	Kitt Peak	Spacewatch	·	1.2 km	MPC · JPL
386252	2008 CR_{15}	—	February 3, 2008	Kitt Peak	Spacewatch	·	670 m	MPC · JPL
386253	2008 CG_{62}	—	November 19, 2007	Kitt Peak	Spacewatch	VER	2.6 km	MPC · JPL
386254	2008 CG_{73}	—	February 6, 2008	Catalina	CSS	·	4.1 km	MPC · JPL
386255	2008 CV_{202}	—	February 8, 2008	Mount Lemmon	Mount Lemmon Survey	·	1.8 km	MPC · JPL
386256	2008 CR_{207}	—	February 8, 2008	Kitt Peak	Spacewatch	·	770 m	MPC · JPL
386257	2008 DW_{29}	—	January 10, 2008	Mount Lemmon	Mount Lemmon Survey	MAS	600 m	MPC · JPL
386258	2008 DK_{57}	—	February 28, 2008	Catalina	CSS	THB	4.5 km	MPC · JPL
386259	2008 EJ_{1}	—	March 2, 2008	Siding Spring	SSS	APO +1km	2.6 km	MPC · JPL
386260	2008 EQ_{67}	—	September 17, 2006	Kitt Peak	Spacewatch	·	650 m	MPC · JPL
386261	2008 FY_{60}	—	March 29, 2008	Mount Lemmon	Mount Lemmon Survey	·	820 m	MPC · JPL
386262	2008 FN_{73}	—	March 30, 2008	Kitt Peak	Spacewatch	·	820 m	MPC · JPL
386263	2008 FQ_{93}	—	March 29, 2008	Kitt Peak	Spacewatch	·	690 m	MPC · JPL
386264	2008 FP_{110}	—	December 1, 2003	Kitt Peak	Spacewatch	·	620 m	MPC · JPL
386265	2008 GO_{6}	—	February 12, 2004	Kitt Peak	Spacewatch	·	1.1 km	MPC · JPL
386266	2008 GS_{75}	—	April 7, 2008	Kitt Peak	Spacewatch	·	830 m	MPC · JPL
386267	2008 HF_{25}	—	April 27, 2008	Mount Lemmon	Mount Lemmon Survey	·	730 m	MPC · JPL
386268	2008 JN_{6}	—	March 31, 2008	Mount Lemmon	Mount Lemmon Survey	·	760 m	MPC · JPL
386269	2008 JE_{17}	—	May 3, 2008	Mount Lemmon	Mount Lemmon Survey	·	780 m	MPC · JPL
386270	2008 JF_{17}	—	May 3, 2008	Mount Lemmon	Mount Lemmon Survey	·	860 m	MPC · JPL
386271	2008 KH_{3}	—	May 26, 2008	Kitt Peak	Spacewatch	·	690 m	MPC · JPL
386272	2008 KP_{10}	—	May 29, 2008	Mount Lemmon	Mount Lemmon Survey	·	860 m	MPC · JPL
386273	2008 KS_{29}	—	May 29, 2008	Kitt Peak	Spacewatch	·	780 m	MPC · JPL
386274	2008 KC_{43}	—	May 26, 2008	Kitt Peak	Spacewatch	·	750 m	MPC · JPL
386275	2008 LT_{14}	—	June 8, 2008	Kitt Peak	Spacewatch	·	1.2 km	MPC · JPL
386276	2008 OB_{25}	—	July 30, 2008	Kitt Peak	Spacewatch	(5)	1.1 km	MPC · JPL
386277	2008 QD	—	August 20, 2008	Piszkéstető	K. Sárneczky	·	1.3 km	MPC · JPL
386278	2008 QN_{10}	—	August 26, 2008	La Sagra	OAM	·	1.5 km	MPC · JPL
386279	2008 QR_{19}	—	August 29, 2008	La Sagra	OAM	·	1.3 km	MPC · JPL
386280	2008 QS_{25}	—	August 30, 2008	Dauban	Kugel, F.	·	1.1 km	MPC · JPL
386281	2008 RJ_{1}	—	September 4, 2008	Kitt Peak	Spacewatch	AMO +1km	930 m	MPC · JPL
386282	2008 RO_{2}	—	September 2, 2008	Kitt Peak	Spacewatch	·	2.2 km	MPC · JPL
386283	2008 RT_{4}	—	September 2, 2008	Kitt Peak	Spacewatch	·	1.0 km	MPC · JPL
386284	2008 RH_{39}	—	September 2, 2008	Kitt Peak	Spacewatch	·	1.9 km	MPC · JPL
386285	2008 RW_{41}	—	September 2, 2008	Kitt Peak	Spacewatch	V	760 m	MPC · JPL
386286	2008 RU_{84}	—	December 8, 2005	Kitt Peak	Spacewatch	·	1.2 km	MPC · JPL
386287	2008 RF_{85}	—	September 4, 2008	Kitt Peak	Spacewatch	(194)	1.8 km	MPC · JPL
386288	2008 RS_{104}	—	February 17, 2007	Kitt Peak	Spacewatch	·	1.2 km	MPC · JPL
386289	2008 RD_{116}	—	September 7, 2008	Mount Lemmon	Mount Lemmon Survey	·	1.8 km	MPC · JPL
386290	2008 RH_{118}	—	September 9, 2008	Mount Lemmon	Mount Lemmon Survey	·	1.3 km	MPC · JPL
386291	2008 RJ_{131}	—	September 9, 2008	Mount Lemmon	Mount Lemmon Survey	·	2.2 km	MPC · JPL
386292	2008 RX_{133}	—	September 6, 2008	Catalina	CSS	NYS	1.3 km	MPC · JPL
386293	2008 RG_{134}	—	September 6, 2008	Catalina	CSS	BRG	1.6 km	MPC · JPL
386294	2008 RJ_{140}	—	September 9, 2008	Catalina	CSS	·	2.2 km	MPC · JPL
386295	2008 RN_{140}	—	September 9, 2008	Catalina	CSS	MAR	970 m	MPC · JPL
386296	2008 SD_{1}	—	September 21, 2008	Grove Creek	Tozzi, F.	·	2.5 km	MPC · JPL
386297	2008 SP_{5}	—	September 22, 2008	Socorro	LINEAR	·	1.2 km	MPC · JPL
386298	2008 SR_{7}	—	September 24, 2008	Catalina	CSS	AMO	340 m	MPC · JPL
386299	2008 SL_{16}	—	September 19, 2008	Kitt Peak	Spacewatch	·	980 m	MPC · JPL
386300	2008 SB_{26}	—	September 19, 2008	Kitt Peak	Spacewatch	·	1.5 km	MPC · JPL

== 386301–386400 ==
back to top

Designation			Discovery			Properties		Ref
Permanent	Provisional	Named after	Date	Site	Discoverer(s)	Category	Diam.	Ref
386301	2008 SS_{28}	—	September 19, 2008	Kitt Peak	Spacewatch	·	1.8 km	MPC · JPL
386302	2008 SA_{29}	—	September 4, 2008	Kitt Peak	Spacewatch	·	1.7 km	MPC · JPL
386303	2008 SF_{29}	—	September 19, 2008	Kitt Peak	Spacewatch	·	2.5 km	MPC · JPL
386304	2008 SN_{35}	—	September 20, 2008	Kitt Peak	Spacewatch	·	1.8 km	MPC · JPL
386305	2008 SD_{45}	—	September 7, 2008	Mount Lemmon	Mount Lemmon Survey	EUN	1.1 km	MPC · JPL
386306	2008 SL_{50}	—	September 20, 2008	Mount Lemmon	Mount Lemmon Survey	MAS	660 m	MPC · JPL
386307	2008 SD_{53}	—	September 20, 2008	Mount Lemmon	Mount Lemmon Survey	·	1.3 km	MPC · JPL
386308	2008 SB_{56}	—	September 20, 2008	Kitt Peak	Spacewatch	KOR	1.4 km	MPC · JPL
386309	2008 SS_{56}	—	September 20, 2008	Mount Lemmon	Mount Lemmon Survey	ADE	3.7 km	MPC · JPL
386310	2008 SM_{59}	—	September 20, 2008	Kitt Peak	Spacewatch	·	1.5 km	MPC · JPL
386311	2008 SW_{59}	—	March 5, 2006	Kitt Peak	Spacewatch	·	1.5 km	MPC · JPL
386312	2008 SB_{64}	—	September 21, 2008	Kitt Peak	Spacewatch	(5)	1.1 km	MPC · JPL
386313	2008 SO_{65}	—	September 7, 2008	Mount Lemmon	Mount Lemmon Survey	·	1.5 km	MPC · JPL
386314	2008 SW_{65}	—	September 21, 2008	Mount Lemmon	Mount Lemmon Survey	·	1.9 km	MPC · JPL
386315	2008 SH_{66}	—	September 21, 2008	Mount Lemmon	Mount Lemmon Survey	AEO	1.1 km	MPC · JPL
386316	2008 SY_{72}	—	September 22, 2008	Mount Lemmon	Mount Lemmon Survey	·	1.4 km	MPC · JPL
386317	2008 SQ_{80}	—	September 23, 2008	Catalina	CSS	EUN	1.7 km	MPC · JPL
386318	2008 SH_{86}	—	September 9, 2008	Kitt Peak	Spacewatch	·	1.5 km	MPC · JPL
386319	2008 SE_{94}	—	September 21, 2008	Kitt Peak	Spacewatch	·	1.8 km	MPC · JPL
386320	2008 SV_{94}	—	September 21, 2008	Kitt Peak	Spacewatch	NYS	1.3 km	MPC · JPL
386321	2008 SC_{100}	—	September 21, 2008	Kitt Peak	Spacewatch	MIS	2.5 km	MPC · JPL
386322	2008 SG_{116}	—	September 22, 2008	Kitt Peak	Spacewatch	(5)	1.4 km	MPC · JPL
386323	2008 SL_{127}	—	September 22, 2008	Mount Lemmon	Mount Lemmon Survey	·	2.1 km	MPC · JPL
386324	2008 SQ_{130}	—	September 22, 2008	Kitt Peak	Spacewatch	·	1.5 km	MPC · JPL
386325	2008 SC_{151}	—	September 9, 2008	Catalina	CSS	JUN	1.4 km	MPC · JPL
386326	2008 SQ_{151}	—	January 28, 2006	Mount Lemmon	Mount Lemmon Survey	·	1.1 km	MPC · JPL
386327	2008 ST_{155}	—	September 22, 2008	Kitt Peak	Spacewatch	RAF	1.1 km	MPC · JPL
386328	2008 SX_{159}	—	September 24, 2008	Socorro	LINEAR	·	1.5 km	MPC · JPL
386329	2008 SL_{167}	—	September 28, 2008	Socorro	LINEAR	·	2.0 km	MPC · JPL
386330	2008 SR_{170}	—	September 21, 2008	Mount Lemmon	Mount Lemmon Survey	·	1.1 km	MPC · JPL
386331	2008 SS_{192}	—	September 25, 2008	Kitt Peak	Spacewatch	·	1.6 km	MPC · JPL
386332	2008 SJ_{193}	—	September 25, 2008	Kitt Peak	Spacewatch	·	1.2 km	MPC · JPL
386333	2008 SB_{201}	—	September 26, 2008	Kitt Peak	Spacewatch	(5)	1.3 km	MPC · JPL
386334	2008 SV_{207}	—	September 27, 2008	Catalina	CSS	EUN	1.5 km	MPC · JPL
386335	2008 SE_{223}	—	September 25, 2008	Mount Lemmon	Mount Lemmon Survey	·	1.3 km	MPC · JPL
386336	2008 SP_{242}	—	September 29, 2008	Kitt Peak	Spacewatch	·	1.9 km	MPC · JPL
386337	2008 SZ_{243}	—	September 24, 2008	Catalina	CSS	·	1.6 km	MPC · JPL
386338	2008 SB_{246}	—	September 9, 2008	Catalina	CSS	EUN	1.6 km	MPC · JPL
386339	2008 SG_{250}	—	September 23, 2008	Catalina	CSS	·	1.9 km	MPC · JPL
386340	2008 SG_{259}	—	September 23, 2008	Catalina	CSS	(5)	1.2 km	MPC · JPL
386341	2008 SJ_{265}	—	September 28, 2008	Mount Lemmon	Mount Lemmon Survey	·	1.4 km	MPC · JPL
386342	2008 SG_{269}	—	September 21, 2008	Mount Lemmon	Mount Lemmon Survey	EUN	1.4 km	MPC · JPL
386343	2008 SG_{271}	—	September 29, 2008	Catalina	CSS	MAR	1.3 km	MPC · JPL
386344	2008 SL_{271}	—	September 29, 2008	Mount Lemmon	Mount Lemmon Survey	·	3.5 km	MPC · JPL
386345	2008 SW_{271}	—	September 24, 2008	Mount Lemmon	Mount Lemmon Survey	·	1.6 km	MPC · JPL
386346	2008 SL_{284}	—	September 24, 2008	Kitt Peak	Spacewatch	·	2.1 km	MPC · JPL
386347	2008 SD_{287}	—	September 23, 2008	Kitt Peak	Spacewatch	·	1.3 km	MPC · JPL
386348	2008 SG_{288}	—	September 23, 2008	Kitt Peak	Spacewatch	·	1.7 km	MPC · JPL
386349	2008 SD_{296}	—	September 28, 2008	Catalina	CSS	·	1.5 km	MPC · JPL
386350	2008 SR_{299}	—	September 22, 2008	Kitt Peak	Spacewatch	·	1.7 km	MPC · JPL
386351	2008 SY_{299}	—	September 22, 2008	Mount Lemmon	Mount Lemmon Survey	·	1.9 km	MPC · JPL
386352	2008 SA_{303}	—	September 24, 2008	Kitt Peak	Spacewatch	·	2.7 km	MPC · JPL
386353	2008 SF_{308}	—	September 29, 2008	Mount Lemmon	Mount Lemmon Survey	(5)	1.4 km	MPC · JPL
386354	2008 TM_{5}	—	October 1, 2008	La Sagra	OAM	·	2.9 km	MPC · JPL
386355	2008 TU_{8}	—	October 6, 2008	Junk Bond	D. Healy	(12739)	1.9 km	MPC · JPL
386356	2008 TS_{23}	—	October 2, 2008	Mount Lemmon	Mount Lemmon Survey	·	1.6 km	MPC · JPL
386357	2008 TL_{45}	—	October 1, 2008	Mount Lemmon	Mount Lemmon Survey	·	1.2 km	MPC · JPL
386358	2008 TX_{45}	—	October 1, 2008	Kitt Peak	Spacewatch	·	1.5 km	MPC · JPL
386359	2008 TW_{49}	—	October 2, 2008	Kitt Peak	Spacewatch	NYS	1.3 km	MPC · JPL
386360	2008 TV_{67}	—	October 2, 2008	Kitt Peak	Spacewatch	·	1.3 km	MPC · JPL
386361	2008 TT_{85}	—	October 3, 2008	Kitt Peak	Spacewatch	·	1.9 km	MPC · JPL
386362	2008 TY_{91}	—	October 4, 2008	Catalina	CSS	·	1.6 km	MPC · JPL
386363	2008 TQ_{95}	—	October 2, 2008	Catalina	CSS	·	1.5 km	MPC · JPL
386364	2008 TP_{113}	—	October 6, 2008	Kitt Peak	Spacewatch	·	1.5 km	MPC · JPL
386365	2008 TG_{124}	—	March 4, 2006	Kitt Peak	Spacewatch	·	1.4 km	MPC · JPL
386366	2008 TN_{127}	—	October 8, 2008	Mount Lemmon	Mount Lemmon Survey	·	1.4 km	MPC · JPL
386367	2008 TS_{127}	—	October 8, 2008	Mount Lemmon	Mount Lemmon Survey	·	1.4 km	MPC · JPL
386368	2008 TU_{128}	—	October 8, 2008	Catalina	CSS	ADE	2.1 km	MPC · JPL
386369	2008 TN_{131}	—	October 8, 2008	Mount Lemmon	Mount Lemmon Survey	·	1.5 km	MPC · JPL
386370	2008 TO_{139}	—	October 8, 2008	Mount Lemmon	Mount Lemmon Survey	·	1.3 km	MPC · JPL
386371	2008 TJ_{145}	—	February 4, 2006	Kitt Peak	Spacewatch	·	1.1 km	MPC · JPL
386372	2008 TT_{149}	—	October 9, 2008	Mount Lemmon	Mount Lemmon Survey	·	1.4 km	MPC · JPL
386373	2008 TV_{164}	—	October 2, 2008	Kitt Peak	Spacewatch	·	1.5 km	MPC · JPL
386374	2008 TO_{166}	—	October 7, 2008	Mount Lemmon	Mount Lemmon Survey	·	1.6 km	MPC · JPL
386375	2008 TN_{173}	—	September 7, 2008	Mount Lemmon	Mount Lemmon Survey	HOF	2.5 km	MPC · JPL
386376	2008 TQ_{177}	—	September 23, 2008	Catalina	CSS	MAR	1.1 km	MPC · JPL
386377	2008 UV_{11}	—	October 17, 2008	Kitt Peak	Spacewatch	·	2.4 km	MPC · JPL
386378	2008 UH_{28}	—	October 20, 2008	Kitt Peak	Spacewatch	·	1.6 km	MPC · JPL
386379	2008 UJ_{41}	—	October 20, 2008	Kitt Peak	Spacewatch	·	1.2 km	MPC · JPL
386380	2008 UB_{54}	—	October 20, 2008	Kitt Peak	Spacewatch	·	1.7 km	MPC · JPL
386381	2008 UR_{60}	—	September 28, 2008	Mount Lemmon	Mount Lemmon Survey	·	1.4 km	MPC · JPL
386382	2008 UZ_{70}	—	October 21, 2008	Kitt Peak	Spacewatch	·	1.6 km	MPC · JPL
386383	2008 UF_{73}	—	October 21, 2008	Kitt Peak	Spacewatch	·	1.8 km	MPC · JPL
386384	2008 UJ_{79}	—	October 22, 2008	Kitt Peak	Spacewatch	(5)	1.1 km	MPC · JPL
386385	2008 UX_{86}	—	September 23, 2008	Kitt Peak	Spacewatch	·	1.7 km	MPC · JPL
386386	2008 UZ_{107}	—	October 21, 2008	Mount Lemmon	Mount Lemmon Survey	·	1.3 km	MPC · JPL
386387	2008 UB_{115}	—	October 22, 2008	Kitt Peak	Spacewatch	·	2.3 km	MPC · JPL
386388	2008 UN_{127}	—	October 22, 2008	Kitt Peak	Spacewatch	·	1.6 km	MPC · JPL
386389	2008 UH_{138}	—	September 22, 2008	Mount Lemmon	Mount Lemmon Survey	·	2.0 km	MPC · JPL
386390	2008 US_{147}	—	October 23, 2008	Kitt Peak	Spacewatch	·	1.5 km	MPC · JPL
386391	2008 UO_{148}	—	October 23, 2008	Kitt Peak	Spacewatch	·	1.6 km	MPC · JPL
386392	2008 UU_{148}	—	October 23, 2008	Kitt Peak	Spacewatch	·	1.6 km	MPC · JPL
386393	2008 US_{158}	—	October 23, 2008	Kitt Peak	Spacewatch	·	2.0 km	MPC · JPL
386394	2008 UQ_{161}	—	October 24, 2008	Kitt Peak	Spacewatch	·	2.1 km	MPC · JPL
386395	2008 UD_{165}	—	October 24, 2008	Kitt Peak	Spacewatch	·	1.3 km	MPC · JPL
386396	2008 UB_{167}	—	October 24, 2008	Kitt Peak	Spacewatch	·	1.3 km	MPC · JPL
386397	2008 UP_{173}	—	September 23, 2008	Catalina	CSS	BRA	1.4 km	MPC · JPL
386398	2008 UT_{173}	—	October 24, 2008	Catalina	CSS	·	1.6 km	MPC · JPL
386399	2008 UF_{180}	—	February 16, 2001	Kitt Peak	Spacewatch	·	1.4 km	MPC · JPL
386400	2008 UC_{184}	—	October 24, 2008	Mount Lemmon	Mount Lemmon Survey	·	1.5 km	MPC · JPL

== 386401–386500 ==
back to top

Designation			Discovery			Properties		Ref
Permanent	Provisional	Named after	Date	Site	Discoverer(s)	Category	Diam.	Ref
386401	2008 UE_{198}	—	October 25, 2008	Socorro	LINEAR	MIS	2.6 km	MPC · JPL
386402	2008 UL_{200}	—	September 7, 2008	Mount Lemmon	Mount Lemmon Survey	·	1.6 km	MPC · JPL
386403	2008 UL_{214}	—	October 10, 2008	Catalina	CSS	·	1.8 km	MPC · JPL
386404	2008 UX_{214}	—	September 29, 2008	Mount Lemmon	Mount Lemmon Survey	·	1.4 km	MPC · JPL
386405	2008 UL_{222}	—	March 8, 2005	Mount Lemmon	Mount Lemmon Survey	·	3.1 km	MPC · JPL
386406	2008 UO_{227}	—	September 16, 2003	Kitt Peak	Spacewatch	·	1.6 km	MPC · JPL
386407	2008 UT_{237}	—	September 30, 2008	Mount Lemmon	Mount Lemmon Survey	·	1.6 km	MPC · JPL
386408	2008 UL_{239}	—	October 26, 2008	Kitt Peak	Spacewatch	·	1.7 km	MPC · JPL
386409	2008 UQ_{244}	—	October 26, 2008	Catalina	CSS	EUN	1.6 km	MPC · JPL
386410	2008 UB_{250}	—	October 27, 2008	Mount Lemmon	Mount Lemmon Survey	·	1.1 km	MPC · JPL
386411	2008 UU_{262}	—	October 27, 2008	Mount Lemmon	Mount Lemmon Survey	EUN	1.7 km	MPC · JPL
386412	2008 US_{284}	—	October 28, 2008	Mount Lemmon	Mount Lemmon Survey	·	1.4 km	MPC · JPL
386413	2008 UT_{286}	—	April 8, 2006	Kitt Peak	Spacewatch	EUN	1.0 km	MPC · JPL
386414	2008 UZ_{303}	—	October 29, 2008	Mount Lemmon	Mount Lemmon Survey	·	1.8 km	MPC · JPL
386415	2008 UD_{306}	—	October 30, 2008	Kitt Peak	Spacewatch	·	1.8 km	MPC · JPL
386416	2008 UM_{337}	—	October 23, 2008	Mount Lemmon	Mount Lemmon Survey	HYG	2.8 km	MPC · JPL
386417	2008 UC_{345}	—	October 31, 2008	Kitt Peak	Spacewatch	·	1.6 km	MPC · JPL
386418	2008 UD_{345}	—	October 31, 2008	Kitt Peak	Spacewatch	·	1.5 km	MPC · JPL
386419	2008 UA_{348}	—	October 23, 2008	Kitt Peak	Spacewatch	·	1.3 km	MPC · JPL
386420	2008 UV_{352}	—	October 27, 2008	Kitt Peak	Spacewatch	·	1.9 km	MPC · JPL
386421	2008 UT_{354}	—	October 27, 2008	Mount Lemmon	Mount Lemmon Survey	·	1.8 km	MPC · JPL
386422	2008 UY_{358}	—	October 27, 2008	Kitt Peak	Spacewatch	·	1.5 km	MPC · JPL
386423	2008 VJ_{1}	—	November 2, 2008	Socorro	LINEAR	·	1.6 km	MPC · JPL
386424	2008 VX_{3}	—	October 30, 2008	Kitt Peak	Spacewatch	·	1.6 km	MPC · JPL
386425	2008 VT_{12}	—	November 3, 2008	Mount Lemmon	Mount Lemmon Survey	·	1.6 km	MPC · JPL
386426	2008 VC_{14}	—	November 3, 2008	Mount Lemmon	Mount Lemmon Survey	·	2.2 km	MPC · JPL
386427	2008 VJ_{18}	—	November 1, 2008	Kitt Peak	Spacewatch	·	1.3 km	MPC · JPL
386428	2008 VW_{18}	—	October 6, 2008	Mount Lemmon	Mount Lemmon Survey	·	1.6 km	MPC · JPL
386429	2008 VU_{21}	—	November 1, 2008	Mount Lemmon	Mount Lemmon Survey	·	1.3 km	MPC · JPL
386430	2008 VY_{21}	—	November 1, 2008	Mount Lemmon	Mount Lemmon Survey	·	1.2 km	MPC · JPL
386431	2008 VM_{34}	—	November 2, 2008	Mount Lemmon	Mount Lemmon Survey	·	1.7 km	MPC · JPL
386432	2008 VO_{38}	—	November 2, 2008	Kitt Peak	Spacewatch	·	1.3 km	MPC · JPL
386433	2008 VX_{59}	—	November 7, 2008	Catalina	CSS	·	2.6 km	MPC · JPL
386434	2008 VF_{68}	—	November 2, 2008	Catalina	CSS	·	2.6 km	MPC · JPL
386435	2008 VT_{76}	—	November 1, 2008	Mount Lemmon	Mount Lemmon Survey	·	2.3 km	MPC · JPL
386436	2008 WV_{8}	—	November 17, 2008	Kitt Peak	Spacewatch	·	1.4 km	MPC · JPL
386437	2008 WS_{22}	—	November 18, 2008	Catalina	CSS	MRX	1.1 km	MPC · JPL
386438	2008 WD_{39}	—	November 17, 2008	Kitt Peak	Spacewatch	·	1.8 km	MPC · JPL
386439	2008 WV_{43}	—	October 31, 2008	Kitt Peak	Spacewatch	·	1.3 km	MPC · JPL
386440	2008 WD_{62}	—	November 22, 2008	La Sagra	OAM	·	3.4 km	MPC · JPL
386441	2008 WF_{68}	—	November 18, 2008	Kitt Peak	Spacewatch	NEM	2.4 km	MPC · JPL
386442	2008 WL_{85}	—	November 20, 2008	Kitt Peak	Spacewatch	·	2.0 km	MPC · JPL
386443	2008 WQ_{90}	—	November 22, 2008	La Sagra	OAM	·	2.7 km	MPC · JPL
386444	2008 WG_{92}	—	November 24, 2008	Dauban	Kugel, F.	·	1.4 km	MPC · JPL
386445	2008 WB_{95}	—	November 21, 2008	Cerro Burek	Burek, Cerro	MAR	1.2 km	MPC · JPL
386446	2008 WQ_{95}	—	November 1, 2008	Mount Lemmon	Mount Lemmon Survey	·	2.0 km	MPC · JPL
386447	2008 WR_{98}	—	November 23, 2008	Mount Lemmon	Mount Lemmon Survey	·	3.3 km	MPC · JPL
386448	2008 WM_{99}	—	September 29, 2008	Mount Lemmon	Mount Lemmon Survey	·	2.2 km	MPC · JPL
386449	2008 WR_{101}	—	November 20, 2008	Kitt Peak	Spacewatch	·	1.9 km	MPC · JPL
386450	2008 WH_{109}	—	November 30, 2008	Kitt Peak	Spacewatch	·	1.6 km	MPC · JPL
386451	2008 WV_{114}	—	November 30, 2008	Kitt Peak	Spacewatch	·	2.5 km	MPC · JPL
386452	2008 WQ_{137}	—	November 23, 2008	Kitt Peak	Spacewatch	·	3.3 km	MPC · JPL
386453	2008 WT_{137}	—	September 27, 2008	Mount Lemmon	Mount Lemmon Survey	·	1.8 km	MPC · JPL
386454	2008 XM	—	December 2, 2008	Socorro	LINEAR	APO · PHA	370 m	MPC · JPL
386455	2008 XZ_{5}	—	December 4, 2008	Socorro	LINEAR	·	4.6 km	MPC · JPL
386456	2008 XV_{11}	—	December 2, 2008	Kitt Peak	Spacewatch	·	1.5 km	MPC · JPL
386457	2008 XO_{14}	—	December 1, 2008	Kitt Peak	Spacewatch	·	1.5 km	MPC · JPL
386458	2008 XW_{17}	—	November 19, 2008	Kitt Peak	Spacewatch	MIS	2.1 km	MPC · JPL
386459	2008 XO_{27}	—	September 24, 2008	Mount Lemmon	Mount Lemmon Survey	526	2.5 km	MPC · JPL
386460	2008 XK_{30}	—	June 15, 2007	Kitt Peak	Spacewatch	·	2.0 km	MPC · JPL
386461	2008 XQ_{39}	—	December 2, 2008	Kitt Peak	Spacewatch	·	2.3 km	MPC · JPL
386462	2008 XZ_{43}	—	December 2, 2008	Kitt Peak	Spacewatch	·	2.2 km	MPC · JPL
386463	2008 YA_{9}	—	December 23, 2008	Piszkéstető	K. Sárneczky	·	1.5 km	MPC · JPL
386464	2008 YW_{9}	—	November 2, 2008	Mount Lemmon	Mount Lemmon Survey	·	2.6 km	MPC · JPL
386465	2008 YS_{11}	—	December 21, 2008	Mount Lemmon	Mount Lemmon Survey	·	2.1 km	MPC · JPL
386466	2008 YP_{22}	—	December 21, 2008	Mount Lemmon	Mount Lemmon Survey	·	1.7 km	MPC · JPL
386467	2008 YG_{23}	—	December 19, 2008	La Sagra	OAM	·	2.9 km	MPC · JPL
386468	2008 YU_{38}	—	November 19, 2008	Kitt Peak	Spacewatch	·	2.5 km	MPC · JPL
386469	2008 YN_{40}	—	December 29, 2008	Mount Lemmon	Mount Lemmon Survey	·	2.4 km	MPC · JPL
386470	2008 YS_{50}	—	December 29, 2008	Mount Lemmon	Mount Lemmon Survey	·	3.3 km	MPC · JPL
386471	2008 YK_{79}	—	December 30, 2008	Mount Lemmon	Mount Lemmon Survey	·	2.2 km	MPC · JPL
386472	2008 YT_{94}	—	December 21, 2008	Mount Lemmon	Mount Lemmon Survey	KOR	1.5 km	MPC · JPL
386473	2008 YV_{94}	—	December 21, 2008	Mount Lemmon	Mount Lemmon Survey	MRX	1.2 km	MPC · JPL
386474	2008 YB_{100}	—	December 29, 2008	Kitt Peak	Spacewatch	KOR	1.3 km	MPC · JPL
386475	2008 YT_{105}	—	December 22, 2008	Kitt Peak	Spacewatch	·	1.7 km	MPC · JPL
386476	2008 YF_{119}	—	December 29, 2008	Kitt Peak	Spacewatch	·	1.7 km	MPC · JPL
386477	2008 YG_{119}	—	December 29, 2008	Kitt Peak	Spacewatch	·	2.0 km	MPC · JPL
386478	2008 YU_{124}	—	September 10, 2007	Kitt Peak	Spacewatch	KOR	1.2 km	MPC · JPL
386479	2008 YR_{146}	—	December 30, 2008	Kitt Peak	Spacewatch	·	3.9 km	MPC · JPL
386480	2008 YS_{156}	—	December 30, 2008	Mount Lemmon	Mount Lemmon Survey	·	3.5 km	MPC · JPL
386481	2008 YC_{165}	—	December 29, 2008	Mount Lemmon	Mount Lemmon Survey	·	2.1 km	MPC · JPL
386482	2008 YY_{167}	—	December 30, 2008	La Sagra	OAM	·	3.0 km	MPC · JPL
386483	2008 YN_{170}	—	December 29, 2008	Kitt Peak	Spacewatch	·	2.1 km	MPC · JPL
386484	2008 YF_{172}	—	December 30, 2008	Mount Lemmon	Mount Lemmon Survey	·	2.0 km	MPC · JPL
386485	2009 AZ_{29}	—	January 15, 2009	Kitt Peak	Spacewatch	(13314)	2.9 km	MPC · JPL
386486	2009 AM_{35}	—	January 15, 2009	Kitt Peak	Spacewatch	HOF	2.5 km	MPC · JPL
386487	2009 AA_{36}	—	January 15, 2009	Kitt Peak	Spacewatch	·	2.2 km	MPC · JPL
386488	2009 AC_{43}	—	January 3, 2009	Mount Lemmon	Mount Lemmon Survey	·	2.1 km	MPC · JPL
386489	2009 AA_{47}	—	January 3, 2009	Mount Lemmon	Mount Lemmon Survey	·	2.7 km	MPC · JPL
386490	2009 AZ_{47}	—	March 4, 2000	Socorro	LINEAR	·	3.1 km	MPC · JPL
386491	2009 BR_{2}	—	January 19, 2009	Mayhill	Lowe, A.	·	3.0 km	MPC · JPL
386492	2009 BT_{26}	—	January 16, 2009	Kitt Peak	Spacewatch	·	2.3 km	MPC · JPL
386493	2009 BC_{32}	—	January 2, 2009	Mount Lemmon	Mount Lemmon Survey	·	1.8 km	MPC · JPL
386494	2009 BC_{38}	—	December 30, 2008	Mount Lemmon	Mount Lemmon Survey	·	2.4 km	MPC · JPL
386495	2009 BG_{38}	—	January 16, 2009	Kitt Peak	Spacewatch	KOR	1.3 km	MPC · JPL
386496	2009 BX_{39}	—	January 16, 2009	Kitt Peak	Spacewatch	·	5.7 km	MPC · JPL
386497	2009 BR_{40}	—	January 16, 2009	Kitt Peak	Spacewatch	·	4.4 km	MPC · JPL
386498	2009 BK_{41}	—	January 16, 2009	Kitt Peak	Spacewatch	·	2.5 km	MPC · JPL
386499	2009 BB_{46}	—	January 16, 2009	Kitt Peak	Spacewatch	·	2.0 km	MPC · JPL
386500	2009 BM_{46}	—	January 16, 2009	Kitt Peak	Spacewatch	HYG	2.7 km	MPC · JPL

== 386501–386600 ==
back to top

Designation			Discovery			Properties		Ref
Permanent	Provisional	Named after	Date	Site	Discoverer(s)	Category	Diam.	Ref
386501	2009 BA_{47}	—	January 16, 2009	Kitt Peak	Spacewatch	HIL · 3:2	6.7 km	MPC · JPL
386502	2009 BJ_{47}	—	January 16, 2009	Kitt Peak	Spacewatch	·	3.3 km	MPC · JPL
386503	2009 BM_{56}	—	January 17, 2009	Kitt Peak	Spacewatch	·	1.8 km	MPC · JPL
386504	2009 BP_{58}	—	January 29, 2009	Catalina	CSS	APO	640 m	MPC · JPL
386505	2009 BU_{60}	—	January 17, 2009	Mount Lemmon	Mount Lemmon Survey	·	2.7 km	MPC · JPL
386506	2009 BX_{77}	—	January 25, 2009	Socorro	LINEAR	·	2.5 km	MPC · JPL
386507	2009 BZ_{87}	—	January 25, 2009	Kitt Peak	Spacewatch	KOR	1.4 km	MPC · JPL
386508	2009 BX_{89}	—	January 25, 2009	Kitt Peak	Spacewatch	·	3.6 km	MPC · JPL
386509	2009 BD_{105}	—	October 2, 2006	Mount Lemmon	Mount Lemmon Survey	·	2.2 km	MPC · JPL
386510	2009 BP_{109}	—	January 30, 2009	Mount Lemmon	Mount Lemmon Survey	·	1.9 km	MPC · JPL
386511	2009 BC_{113}	—	November 24, 2008	Mount Lemmon	Mount Lemmon Survey	EOS	2.3 km	MPC · JPL
386512	2009 BD_{113}	—	January 24, 2009	Cerro Burek	Burek, Cerro	·	3.5 km	MPC · JPL
386513	2009 BM_{115}	—	December 22, 2008	Kitt Peak	Spacewatch	KOR	1.5 km	MPC · JPL
386514	2009 BX_{115}	—	December 31, 2008	Kitt Peak	Spacewatch	·	2.0 km	MPC · JPL
386515	2009 BY_{127}	—	December 22, 2008	Mount Lemmon	Mount Lemmon Survey	·	2.7 km	MPC · JPL
386516	2009 BJ_{129}	—	January 30, 2009	Mount Lemmon	Mount Lemmon Survey	EOS	1.8 km	MPC · JPL
386517	2009 BK_{131}	—	January 31, 2009	Mount Lemmon	Mount Lemmon Survey	·	2.3 km	MPC · JPL
386518	2009 BV_{134}	—	January 15, 2009	Kitt Peak	Spacewatch	EOS	1.6 km	MPC · JPL
386519	2009 BQ_{135}	—	January 29, 2009	Kitt Peak	Spacewatch	·	1.5 km	MPC · JPL
386520	2009 BD_{146}	—	January 3, 2009	Mount Lemmon	Mount Lemmon Survey	·	2.8 km	MPC · JPL
386521	2009 BY_{149}	—	January 31, 2009	Kitt Peak	Spacewatch	·	2.5 km	MPC · JPL
386522	2009 BD_{154}	—	January 20, 2009	Kitt Peak	Spacewatch	·	1.6 km	MPC · JPL
386523	2009 BL_{159}	—	January 3, 2009	Mount Lemmon	Mount Lemmon Survey	·	3.0 km	MPC · JPL
386524	2009 BQ_{161}	—	January 24, 2009	Cerro Burek	Burek, Cerro	·	3.8 km	MPC · JPL
386525	2009 BR_{174}	—	January 25, 2009	Kitt Peak	Spacewatch	·	3.2 km	MPC · JPL
386526	2009 BD_{183}	—	January 25, 2009	Catalina	CSS	EOS	2.5 km	MPC · JPL
386527	2009 BV_{184}	—	January 18, 2009	Socorro	LINEAR	H	520 m	MPC · JPL
386528 Walterfürtig	2009 CB_{5}	Walterfürtig	February 12, 2009	Calar Alto	F. Hormuth	·	1.8 km	MPC · JPL
386529	2009 CR_{20}	—	February 1, 2009	Kitt Peak	Spacewatch	AGN	1.3 km	MPC · JPL
386530	2009 CA_{21}	—	January 18, 2009	Kitt Peak	Spacewatch	·	1.7 km	MPC · JPL
386531	2009 CQ_{23}	—	January 18, 2009	Kitt Peak	Spacewatch	NAE	2.2 km	MPC · JPL
386532	2009 CA_{25}	—	February 1, 2009	Mount Lemmon	Mount Lemmon Survey	·	2.5 km	MPC · JPL
386533	2009 CW_{32}	—	February 1, 2009	Kitt Peak	Spacewatch	·	2.1 km	MPC · JPL
386534	2009 CY_{34}	—	February 2, 2009	Mount Lemmon	Mount Lemmon Survey	·	1.9 km	MPC · JPL
386535	2009 CF_{42}	—	February 13, 2009	Kitt Peak	Spacewatch	EOS	2.4 km	MPC · JPL
386536	2009 CJ_{48}	—	February 14, 2009	Kitt Peak	Spacewatch	·	1.5 km	MPC · JPL
386537	2009 CE_{49}	—	February 14, 2009	Mount Lemmon	Mount Lemmon Survey	·	1.6 km	MPC · JPL
386538	2009 CW_{56}	—	February 4, 2009	Mount Lemmon	Mount Lemmon Survey	·	3.2 km	MPC · JPL
386539	2009 CT_{57}	—	February 2, 2009	Catalina	CSS	·	5.0 km	MPC · JPL
386540	2009 CN_{58}	—	February 3, 2009	Mount Lemmon	Mount Lemmon Survey	URS	4.2 km	MPC · JPL
386541	2009 CM_{59}	—	February 3, 2009	Mount Lemmon	Mount Lemmon Survey	·	3.4 km	MPC · JPL
386542	2009 CL_{62}	—	February 5, 2009	Mount Lemmon	Mount Lemmon Survey	·	3.0 km	MPC · JPL
386543	2009 DZ_{2}	—	February 17, 2009	Calar Alto	F. Hormuth	·	2.2 km	MPC · JPL
386544	2009 DZ_{3}	—	February 18, 2009	Socorro	LINEAR	T_{j} (2.99)	5.0 km	MPC · JPL
386545	2009 DY_{5}	—	November 22, 2008	Kitt Peak	Spacewatch	·	4.0 km	MPC · JPL
386546	2009 DE_{14}	—	February 18, 2009	Bergisch Gladbach	W. Bickel	·	3.1 km	MPC · JPL
386547	2009 DP_{14}	—	February 19, 2009	Mount Lemmon	Mount Lemmon Survey	·	2.3 km	MPC · JPL
386548	2009 DH_{16}	—	February 17, 2009	La Sagra	OAM	TRE	3.1 km	MPC · JPL
386549	2009 DC_{17}	—	January 30, 2009	Mount Lemmon	Mount Lemmon Survey	THB	3.2 km	MPC · JPL
386550	2009 DT_{31}	—	February 20, 2009	Kitt Peak	Spacewatch	·	3.0 km	MPC · JPL
386551	2009 DS_{39}	—	January 16, 2009	Kitt Peak	Spacewatch	·	3.2 km	MPC · JPL
386552	2009 DM_{43}	—	January 25, 1998	Kitt Peak	Spacewatch	·	3.3 km	MPC · JPL
386553	2009 DQ_{49}	—	February 19, 2009	Kitt Peak	Spacewatch	THM	2.6 km	MPC · JPL
386554	2009 DX_{52}	—	February 5, 2009	Kitt Peak	Spacewatch	·	3.0 km	MPC · JPL
386555	2009 DJ_{53}	—	February 22, 2009	Kitt Peak	Spacewatch	·	3.2 km	MPC · JPL
386556	2009 DG_{55}	—	February 22, 2009	Kitt Peak	Spacewatch	·	1.9 km	MPC · JPL
386557	2009 DU_{65}	—	February 22, 2009	Mount Lemmon	Mount Lemmon Survey	·	3.4 km	MPC · JPL
386558	2009 DL_{66}	—	February 24, 2009	Mount Lemmon	Mount Lemmon Survey	KOR	1.5 km	MPC · JPL
386559	2009 DW_{72}	—	April 19, 2004	Kitt Peak	Spacewatch	·	3.0 km	MPC · JPL
386560	2009 DB_{78}	—	December 30, 2008	Mount Lemmon	Mount Lemmon Survey	EOS	1.8 km	MPC · JPL
386561	2009 DD_{79}	—	January 31, 2009	Kitt Peak	Spacewatch	·	3.0 km	MPC · JPL
386562	2009 DU_{85}	—	February 27, 2009	Kitt Peak	Spacewatch	KOR	1.7 km	MPC · JPL
386563	2009 DL_{86}	—	February 14, 2009	Kitt Peak	Spacewatch	·	3.7 km	MPC · JPL
386564	2009 DK_{91}	—	February 3, 2009	Kitt Peak	Spacewatch	·	2.6 km	MPC · JPL
386565	2009 DT_{98}	—	October 16, 2006	Catalina	CSS	·	3.2 km	MPC · JPL
386566	2009 DN_{101}	—	February 13, 2009	Kitt Peak	Spacewatch	·	3.4 km	MPC · JPL
386567	2009 DW_{111}	—	August 29, 2006	Kitt Peak	Spacewatch	·	2.8 km	MPC · JPL
386568	2009 DO_{117}	—	February 27, 2009	Kitt Peak	Spacewatch	EOS	2.3 km	MPC · JPL
386569	2009 DX_{118}	—	February 27, 2009	Kitt Peak	Spacewatch	·	2.6 km	MPC · JPL
386570	2009 DG_{129}	—	February 26, 2009	Kitt Peak	Spacewatch	·	2.6 km	MPC · JPL
386571	2009 DS_{129}	—	February 27, 2009	Kitt Peak	Spacewatch	·	2.5 km	MPC · JPL
386572	2009 DW_{129}	—	February 27, 2009	Kitt Peak	Spacewatch	·	2.8 km	MPC · JPL
386573	2009 DD_{132}	—	February 20, 2009	Kitt Peak	Spacewatch	·	2.8 km	MPC · JPL
386574	2009 DO_{132}	—	February 20, 2009	Kitt Peak	Spacewatch	THM	2.4 km	MPC · JPL
386575	2009 DA_{140}	—	February 19, 2009	Kitt Peak	Spacewatch	·	2.8 km	MPC · JPL
386576	2009 DJ_{142}	—	February 19, 2009	Kitt Peak	Spacewatch	·	2.2 km	MPC · JPL
386577	2009 DN_{142}	—	February 27, 2009	Kitt Peak	Spacewatch	·	2.9 km	MPC · JPL
386578	2009 EY_{1}	—	March 1, 2009	Kitt Peak	Spacewatch	·	2.8 km	MPC · JPL
386579	2009 EA_{14}	—	February 2, 2009	Mount Lemmon	Mount Lemmon Survey	EOS	2.5 km	MPC · JPL
386580	2009 EF_{14}	—	March 15, 2009	Kitt Peak	Spacewatch	·	2.7 km	MPC · JPL
386581	2009 EJ_{14}	—	March 15, 2009	Kitt Peak	Spacewatch	EOS	1.6 km	MPC · JPL
386582	2009 FV_{18}	—	March 20, 2009	La Sagra	OAM	·	2.4 km	MPC · JPL
386583	2009 FM_{22}	—	March 19, 2009	Bergisch Gladbach	W. Bickel	·	3.0 km	MPC · JPL
386584	2009 FC_{27}	—	March 19, 2009	Mount Lemmon	Mount Lemmon Survey	EOS	2.2 km	MPC · JPL
386585	2009 FM_{30}	—	March 23, 2009	Hibiscus	Teamo, N.	·	2.7 km	MPC · JPL
386586	2009 FQ_{30}	—	March 25, 2009	Hibiscus	Teamo, N.	·	2.9 km	MPC · JPL
386587	2009 FT_{30}	—	March 19, 2009	Catalina	CSS	H	710 m	MPC · JPL
386588	2009 FP_{33}	—	March 1, 2009	Mount Lemmon	Mount Lemmon Survey	·	2.5 km	MPC · JPL
386589	2009 FH_{39}	—	March 24, 2009	Mount Lemmon	Mount Lemmon Survey	·	2.5 km	MPC · JPL
386590	2009 FZ_{49}	—	March 27, 2009	Catalina	CSS	·	4.1 km	MPC · JPL
386591	2009 FN_{52}	—	March 28, 2009	Mount Lemmon	Mount Lemmon Survey	·	4.5 km	MPC · JPL
386592	2009 FS_{54}	—	March 29, 2009	Mount Lemmon	Mount Lemmon Survey	H · slow	640 m	MPC · JPL
386593	2009 FN_{56}	—	March 22, 2009	Catalina	CSS	·	3.5 km	MPC · JPL
386594	2009 FS_{56}	—	March 23, 2009	Siding Spring	SSS	H	740 m	MPC · JPL
386595	2009 FY_{56}	—	March 25, 2009	Siding Spring	SSS	EUP	4.4 km	MPC · JPL
386596	2009 FD_{58}	—	March 21, 2009	Kitt Peak	Spacewatch	·	4.3 km	MPC · JPL
386597	2009 FR_{59}	—	March 27, 2009	Siding Spring	SSS	·	3.6 km	MPC · JPL
386598	2009 FO_{65}	—	March 18, 2009	Catalina	CSS	·	3.3 km	MPC · JPL
386599	2009 FK_{67}	—	March 19, 2009	Mount Lemmon	Mount Lemmon Survey	·	3.0 km	MPC · JPL
386600	2009 FX_{68}	—	March 16, 2009	Catalina	CSS	·	3.2 km	MPC · JPL

== 386601–386700 ==
back to top

Designation			Discovery			Properties		Ref
Permanent	Provisional	Named after	Date	Site	Discoverer(s)	Category	Diam.	Ref
386601	2009 FP_{69}	—	March 18, 2009	Kitt Peak	Spacewatch	·	3.5 km	MPC · JPL
386602	2009 FZ_{76}	—	March 19, 2009	Kitt Peak	Spacewatch	·	2.2 km	MPC · JPL
386603	2009 FG_{77}	—	March 19, 2009	Mount Lemmon	Mount Lemmon Survey	·	2.4 km	MPC · JPL
386604	2009 GO_{5}	—	April 2, 2009	Mount Lemmon	Mount Lemmon Survey	·	3.2 km	MPC · JPL
386605	2009 HW_{5}	—	April 17, 2009	Kitt Peak	Spacewatch	·	2.9 km	MPC · JPL
386606	2009 HM_{11}	—	April 18, 2009	Catalina	CSS	·	3.1 km	MPC · JPL
386607	2009 HQ_{29}	—	April 19, 2009	Kitt Peak	Spacewatch	·	3.7 km	MPC · JPL
386608	2009 HR_{36}	—	April 20, 2009	La Sagra	OAM	TIR	3.3 km	MPC · JPL
386609	2009 HF_{73}	—	April 27, 2009	Siding Spring	SSS	H	620 m	MPC · JPL
386610	2009 HW_{95}	—	March 18, 2009	Kitt Peak	Spacewatch	·	2.7 km	MPC · JPL
386611	2009 HF_{97}	—	April 17, 2009	Kitt Peak	Spacewatch	·	4.2 km	MPC · JPL
386612	2009 HB_{100}	—	April 27, 2009	Kitt Peak	Spacewatch	·	3.2 km	MPC · JPL
386613	2009 JN_{18}	—	May 1, 2009	Mount Lemmon	Mount Lemmon Survey	·	1.1 km	MPC · JPL
386614	2009 OW_{15}	—	July 28, 2009	Kitt Peak	Spacewatch	·	660 m	MPC · JPL
386615	2009 QP_{6}	—	August 18, 2009	Wildberg	R. Apitzsch	·	690 m	MPC · JPL
386616	2009 QC_{26}	—	August 20, 2009	Taunus	Karge, S., Zimmer, U.	·	750 m	MPC · JPL
386617	2009 QV_{53}	—	August 17, 2009	Kitt Peak	Spacewatch	·	730 m	MPC · JPL
386618 Accomazzo	2009 RD_{26}	Accomazzo	September 13, 2009	ESA OGS	ESA OGS	·	1.4 km	MPC · JPL
386619	2009 RP_{51}	—	September 15, 2009	Kitt Peak	Spacewatch	·	910 m	MPC · JPL
386620	2009 RX_{54}	—	September 6, 2008	Catalina	CSS	L4	9.2 km	MPC · JPL
386621	2009 RL_{59}	—	September 15, 2009	Kitt Peak	Spacewatch	·	1.3 km	MPC · JPL
386622 New Zealand	2009 SA_{1}	New Zealand	September 16, 2009	Farm Cove	McCormick, J.	·	760 m	MPC · JPL
386623	2009 SY_{27}	—	September 16, 2009	Kitt Peak	Spacewatch	·	670 m	MPC · JPL
386624	2009 SU_{28}	—	September 16, 2009	Kitt Peak	Spacewatch	·	690 m	MPC · JPL
386625	2009 SH_{29}	—	September 16, 2009	Kitt Peak	Spacewatch	·	1.1 km	MPC · JPL
386626	2009 SS_{30}	—	September 16, 2009	Kitt Peak	Spacewatch	·	910 m	MPC · JPL
386627	2009 SY_{59}	—	September 17, 2009	Kitt Peak	Spacewatch	L4	10 km	MPC · JPL
386628	2009 SP_{75}	—	September 17, 2009	Kitt Peak	Spacewatch	·	1.1 km	MPC · JPL
386629	2009 SM_{86}	—	September 18, 2009	Kitt Peak	Spacewatch	·	2.0 km	MPC · JPL
386630	2009 SR_{95}	—	November 17, 2006	Mount Lemmon	Mount Lemmon Survey	·	880 m	MPC · JPL
386631	2009 SX_{104}	—	December 13, 2006	Kitt Peak	Spacewatch	·	660 m	MPC · JPL
386632	2009 SF_{108}	—	September 16, 2009	Mount Lemmon	Mount Lemmon Survey	·	1.8 km	MPC · JPL
386633	2009 SS_{139}	—	August 21, 2008	Kitt Peak	Spacewatch	L4	10 km	MPC · JPL
386634	2009 SW_{169}	—	September 26, 2009	Modra	Gajdoš, S., Világi, J.	·	640 m	MPC · JPL
386635	2009 SQ_{185}	—	September 21, 2009	Kitt Peak	Spacewatch	·	780 m	MPC · JPL
386636	2009 SF_{200}	—	September 22, 2009	Kitt Peak	Spacewatch	·	1.3 km	MPC · JPL
386637	2009 SB_{208}	—	September 23, 2009	Kitt Peak	Spacewatch	(2076)	770 m	MPC · JPL
386638	2009 SB_{234}	—	September 23, 2009	Kitt Peak	Spacewatch	·	1.0 km	MPC · JPL
386639	2009 SP_{240}	—	September 18, 2009	Catalina	CSS	EUN	1.5 km	MPC · JPL
386640	2009 SE_{246}	—	September 17, 2009	Kitt Peak	Spacewatch	L4	9.1 km	MPC · JPL
386641	2009 SF_{250}	—	September 19, 2009	Kitt Peak	Spacewatch	·	950 m	MPC · JPL
386642	2009 SS_{254}	—	September 25, 2009	Kitt Peak	Spacewatch	·	910 m	MPC · JPL
386643	2009 SQ_{258}	—	December 22, 2003	Kitt Peak	Spacewatch	·	610 m	MPC · JPL
386644	2009 SE_{262}	—	August 29, 2005	Kitt Peak	Spacewatch	·	1.3 km	MPC · JPL
386645	2009 SW_{262}	—	September 23, 2009	Mount Lemmon	Mount Lemmon Survey	L4	8.4 km	MPC · JPL
386646	2009 SY_{271}	—	September 24, 2009	Kitt Peak	Spacewatch	·	1.2 km	MPC · JPL
386647	2009 SJ_{308}	—	September 17, 2009	Kitt Peak	Spacewatch	NYS	830 m	MPC · JPL
386648	2009 SP_{314}	—	June 3, 2005	Catalina	CSS	·	860 m	MPC · JPL
386649	2009 SK_{319}	—	September 20, 2009	Kitt Peak	Spacewatch	L4	9.1 km	MPC · JPL
386650	2009 SF_{321}	—	September 21, 2009	Kitt Peak	Spacewatch	·	850 m	MPC · JPL
386651	2009 SM_{349}	—	September 21, 2009	Mount Lemmon	Mount Lemmon Survey	·	750 m	MPC · JPL
386652	2009 SN_{352}	—	September 20, 2009	Mount Lemmon	Mount Lemmon Survey	·	1.0 km	MPC · JPL
386653	2009 SP_{361}	—	September 28, 2009	Mount Lemmon	Mount Lemmon Survey	·	1.1 km	MPC · JPL
386654	2009 TH_{3}	—	October 10, 2009	La Sagra	OAM	PHO	1.2 km	MPC · JPL
386655	2009 TA_{7}	—	October 12, 2009	La Sagra	OAM	·	1.0 km	MPC · JPL
386656	2009 TV_{10}	—	October 11, 2009	Mount Lemmon	Mount Lemmon Survey	NYS	870 m	MPC · JPL
386657	2009 TV_{45}	—	October 14, 2009	Catalina	CSS	·	1.2 km	MPC · JPL
386658	2009 UF_{12}	—	October 17, 2009	La Sagra	OAM	·	1.6 km	MPC · JPL
386659	2009 UQ_{28}	—	October 18, 2009	Mount Lemmon	Mount Lemmon Survey	·	990 m	MPC · JPL
386660	2009 UY_{29}	—	October 18, 2009	Mount Lemmon	Mount Lemmon Survey	·	1.1 km	MPC · JPL
386661	2009 UE_{47}	—	October 18, 2009	Mount Lemmon	Mount Lemmon Survey	·	810 m	MPC · JPL
386662	2009 UQ_{50}	—	October 22, 2009	Mount Lemmon	Mount Lemmon Survey	·	750 m	MPC · JPL
386663	2009 UD_{58}	—	October 23, 2009	Mount Lemmon	Mount Lemmon Survey	·	900 m	MPC · JPL
386664	2009 UO_{75}	—	October 21, 2009	Mount Lemmon	Mount Lemmon Survey	·	1.5 km	MPC · JPL
386665	2009 UG_{79}	—	October 21, 2009	Mount Lemmon	Mount Lemmon Survey	·	780 m	MPC · JPL
386666	2009 UR_{93}	—	September 18, 2009	Mount Lemmon	Mount Lemmon Survey	·	960 m	MPC · JPL
386667	2009 UO_{101}	—	October 23, 2009	Mount Lemmon	Mount Lemmon Survey	·	1.1 km	MPC · JPL
386668	2009 UL_{118}	—	October 23, 2009	Mount Lemmon	Mount Lemmon Survey	NYS	870 m	MPC · JPL
386669	2009 UJ_{120}	—	January 10, 2007	Mount Lemmon	Mount Lemmon Survey	·	720 m	MPC · JPL
386670	2009 UD_{121}	—	October 24, 2009	Kitt Peak	Spacewatch	NYS	1.1 km	MPC · JPL
386671	2009 UX_{128}	—	October 29, 2009	Bisei SG Center	BATTeRS	·	1.0 km	MPC · JPL
386672	2009 UA_{129}	—	October 29, 2009	Bisei SG Center	BATTeRS	·	950 m	MPC · JPL
386673	2009 UJ_{141}	—	October 27, 2009	Mount Lemmon	Mount Lemmon Survey	·	1.3 km	MPC · JPL
386674	2009 UU_{148}	—	October 16, 2009	Mount Lemmon	Mount Lemmon Survey	L4	9.6 km	MPC · JPL
386675	2009 VQ_{43}	—	November 9, 2009	Catalina	CSS	·	2.3 km	MPC · JPL
386676	2009 VT_{43}	—	November 10, 2009	La Sagra	OAM	·	1.1 km	MPC · JPL
386677	2009 VW_{43}	—	November 11, 2009	La Sagra	OAM	·	1.4 km	MPC · JPL
386678	2009 VA_{51}	—	November 15, 2009	Catalina	CSS	·	860 m	MPC · JPL
386679	2009 VR_{51}	—	November 11, 2009	Socorro	LINEAR	NYS	1.1 km	MPC · JPL
386680	2009 VS_{57}	—	November 12, 2009	La Sagra	OAM	NYS	1.0 km	MPC · JPL
386681	2009 VE_{64}	—	November 8, 2009	Kitt Peak	Spacewatch	MAS	610 m	MPC · JPL
386682	2009 VS_{64}	—	November 9, 2009	Kitt Peak	Spacewatch	·	1.0 km	MPC · JPL
386683	2009 VE_{66}	—	November 9, 2009	Kitt Peak	Spacewatch	·	910 m	MPC · JPL
386684	2009 VZ_{66}	—	November 9, 2009	Kitt Peak	Spacewatch	NYS	930 m	MPC · JPL
386685	2009 VM_{75}	—	November 12, 2009	La Sagra	OAM	·	1.0 km	MPC · JPL
386686	2009 VY_{80}	—	November 10, 2009	La Sagra	OAM	NYS	1.1 km	MPC · JPL
386687	2009 VX_{84}	—	August 17, 2009	Catalina	CSS	·	890 m	MPC · JPL
386688	2009 VB_{94}	—	November 15, 2009	Catalina	CSS	·	980 m	MPC · JPL
386689	2009 WB_{7}	—	November 18, 2009	Marly	P. Kocher	·	1.8 km	MPC · JPL
386690	2009 WQ_{9}	—	November 19, 2009	Socorro	LINEAR	·	990 m	MPC · JPL
386691	2009 WT_{9}	—	November 19, 2009	Socorro	LINEAR	·	1.1 km	MPC · JPL
386692	2009 WH_{17}	—	February 6, 2007	Mount Lemmon	Mount Lemmon Survey	·	700 m	MPC · JPL
386693	2009 WV_{32}	—	September 20, 2009	Mount Lemmon	Mount Lemmon Survey	·	2.6 km	MPC · JPL
386694	2009 WZ_{34}	—	November 16, 2009	Mount Lemmon	Mount Lemmon Survey	MAR	1.2 km	MPC · JPL
386695	2009 WT_{38}	—	November 17, 2009	Kitt Peak	Spacewatch	NYS	700 m	MPC · JPL
386696	2009 WY_{38}	—	November 17, 2009	Kitt Peak	Spacewatch	·	2.0 km	MPC · JPL
386697	2009 WZ_{38}	—	November 17, 2009	Kitt Peak	Spacewatch	·	900 m	MPC · JPL
386698	2009 WE_{39}	—	November 17, 2009	Kitt Peak	Spacewatch	MAS	580 m	MPC · JPL
386699	2009 WF_{40}	—	November 17, 2009	Kitt Peak	Spacewatch	·	1.0 km	MPC · JPL
386700	2009 WD_{45}	—	November 18, 2009	Kitt Peak	Spacewatch	·	700 m	MPC · JPL

== 386701–386800 ==
back to top

Designation			Discovery			Properties		Ref
Permanent	Provisional	Named after	Date	Site	Discoverer(s)	Category	Diam.	Ref
386701	2009 WH_{72}	—	November 18, 2009	Kitt Peak	Spacewatch	MAS	790 m	MPC · JPL
386702	2009 WN_{73}	—	November 18, 2009	Kitt Peak	Spacewatch	·	1.3 km	MPC · JPL
386703	2009 WV_{88}	—	November 19, 2009	Kitt Peak	Spacewatch	·	1.4 km	MPC · JPL
386704	2009 WV_{101}	—	June 17, 2005	Mount Lemmon	Mount Lemmon Survey	NYS	1.2 km	MPC · JPL
386705	2009 WG_{103}	—	November 22, 2009	Kitt Peak	Spacewatch	·	880 m	MPC · JPL
386706	2009 WN_{117}	—	November 20, 2009	Kitt Peak	Spacewatch	MAS	580 m	MPC · JPL
386707	2009 WK_{123}	—	November 20, 2009	Kitt Peak	Spacewatch	·	1.4 km	MPC · JPL
386708	2009 WX_{144}	—	October 30, 2002	Kitt Peak	Spacewatch	·	780 m	MPC · JPL
386709	2009 WM_{163}	—	November 21, 2009	Kitt Peak	Spacewatch	NYS	900 m	MPC · JPL
386710	2009 WL_{167}	—	November 22, 2009	Kitt Peak	Spacewatch	·	2.1 km	MPC · JPL
386711	2009 WW_{177}	—	November 9, 2005	Kitt Peak	Spacewatch	·	1.3 km	MPC · JPL
386712	2009 WB_{183}	—	November 17, 2009	Mount Lemmon	Mount Lemmon Survey	·	1.1 km	MPC · JPL
386713	2009 WX_{188}	—	November 12, 2005	Kitt Peak	Spacewatch	·	850 m	MPC · JPL
386714	2009 WK_{193}	—	November 24, 2009	Mount Lemmon	Mount Lemmon Survey	·	930 m	MPC · JPL
386715	2009 WT_{210}	—	February 27, 2007	Kitt Peak	Spacewatch	·	1.0 km	MPC · JPL
386716	2009 WS_{215}	—	November 19, 2009	Catalina	CSS	·	860 m	MPC · JPL
386717	2009 WQ_{217}	—	November 17, 2009	Kitt Peak	Spacewatch	·	1.4 km	MPC · JPL
386718	2009 WX_{259}	—	November 17, 2009	Kitt Peak	Spacewatch	NYS	1.3 km	MPC · JPL
386719	2009 WY_{260}	—	November 21, 2009	Mount Lemmon	Mount Lemmon Survey	·	1.3 km	MPC · JPL
386720	2009 XC_{2}	—	December 11, 2009	Socorro	LINEAR	AMO +1km	960 m	MPC · JPL
386721	2009 XN_{12}	—	August 31, 2005	Kitt Peak	Spacewatch	NYS	1.7 km	MPC · JPL
386722	2009 YC_{5}	—	December 17, 2009	Mount Lemmon	Mount Lemmon Survey	·	1.0 km	MPC · JPL
386723	2009 YE_{7}	—	December 17, 2009	La Silla	D. L. Rabinowitz	Haumea	245 km	MPC · JPL
386724	2009 YN_{20}	—	December 27, 2009	Kitt Peak	Spacewatch	SUL	2.0 km	MPC · JPL
386725	2009 YB_{24}	—	December 16, 2009	Socorro	LINEAR	·	2.3 km	MPC · JPL
386726	2010 AF_{1}	—	January 5, 2010	Kitt Peak	Spacewatch	·	1.3 km	MPC · JPL
386727	2010 AP_{1}	—	January 5, 2010	Kitt Peak	Spacewatch	EUN	1.3 km	MPC · JPL
386728	2010 AY_{8}	—	January 6, 2010	Kitt Peak	Spacewatch	·	1.4 km	MPC · JPL
386729	2010 AJ_{17}	—	January 7, 2010	Kitt Peak	Spacewatch	·	2.2 km	MPC · JPL
386730	2010 AA_{30}	—	January 8, 2010	Kitt Peak	Spacewatch	·	930 m	MPC · JPL
386731	2010 AT_{35}	—	January 7, 2010	Kitt Peak	Spacewatch	·	1.6 km	MPC · JPL
386732	2010 AU_{41}	—	January 6, 2010	Catalina	CSS	V	810 m	MPC · JPL
386733	2010 AK_{44}	—	November 19, 2009	Mount Lemmon	Mount Lemmon Survey	·	1.2 km	MPC · JPL
386734	2010 AM_{45}	—	November 28, 2005	Kitt Peak	Spacewatch	·	1.6 km	MPC · JPL
386735	2010 AQ_{45}	—	December 18, 2009	Mount Lemmon	Mount Lemmon Survey	NYS	1.5 km	MPC · JPL
386736	2010 AZ_{45}	—	January 7, 2010	Mount Lemmon	Mount Lemmon Survey	·	1.2 km	MPC · JPL
386737	2010 AR_{50}	—	September 22, 2008	Kitt Peak	Spacewatch	V	1.0 km	MPC · JPL
386738	2010 AV_{58}	—	September 12, 2007	Mount Lemmon	Mount Lemmon Survey	·	4.7 km	MPC · JPL
386739	2010 AH_{65}	—	January 11, 2010	Kitt Peak	Spacewatch	·	1.8 km	MPC · JPL
386740	2010 AX_{66}	—	January 11, 2010	Kitt Peak	Spacewatch	·	2.1 km	MPC · JPL
386741	2010 AO_{67}	—	July 29, 2008	Mount Lemmon	Mount Lemmon Survey	·	1.4 km	MPC · JPL
386742	2010 AO_{80}	—	January 12, 2010	Kitt Peak	Spacewatch	·	2.7 km	MPC · JPL
386743	2010 AR_{116}	—	January 13, 2010	WISE	WISE	·	4.8 km	MPC · JPL
386744	2010 BH_{3}	—	January 19, 2010	Dauban	Kugel, F.	EUN	1.2 km	MPC · JPL
386745	2010 BC_{10}	—	December 5, 2008	Mount Lemmon	Mount Lemmon Survey	·	3.6 km	MPC · JPL
386746	2010 BU_{11}	—	January 16, 2010	WISE	WISE	GEF ·	2.4 km	MPC · JPL
386747	2010 BC_{25}	—	January 17, 2010	WISE	WISE	·	4.7 km	MPC · JPL
386748	2010 BS_{39}	—	October 13, 2007	Mount Lemmon	Mount Lemmon Survey	·	3.1 km	MPC · JPL
386749	2010 BZ_{60}	—	January 21, 2010	WISE	WISE	·	2.1 km	MPC · JPL
386750	2010 BB_{94}	—	January 27, 2010	WISE	WISE	3:2 · SHU	5.5 km	MPC · JPL
386751	2010 CR_{10}	—	February 9, 2010	WISE	WISE	VER	4.5 km	MPC · JPL
386752	2010 CW_{12}	—	February 9, 2010	WISE	WISE	·	2.4 km	MPC · JPL
386753	2010 CV_{32}	—	October 7, 2008	Mount Lemmon	Mount Lemmon Survey	·	1.9 km	MPC · JPL
386754	2010 CB_{40}	—	February 13, 2010	Mount Lemmon	Mount Lemmon Survey	KRM	2.2 km	MPC · JPL
386755	2010 CZ_{40}	—	February 13, 2010	Mount Lemmon	Mount Lemmon Survey	·	2.5 km	MPC · JPL
386756	2010 CT_{59}	—	February 14, 2010	Socorro	LINEAR	·	1.7 km	MPC · JPL
386757	2010 CL_{63}	—	February 9, 2010	Kitt Peak	Spacewatch	·	2.0 km	MPC · JPL
386758	2010 CJ_{68}	—	February 10, 2010	Kitt Peak	Spacewatch	·	1.2 km	MPC · JPL
386759	2010 CW_{89}	—	February 14, 2010	Mount Lemmon	Mount Lemmon Survey	PHO	1.1 km	MPC · JPL
386760	2010 CK_{93}	—	February 14, 2010	Kitt Peak	Spacewatch	·	1.4 km	MPC · JPL
386761	2010 CJ_{98}	—	February 14, 2010	Kitt Peak	Spacewatch	·	1.3 km	MPC · JPL
386762	2010 CE_{102}	—	February 14, 2010	Mount Lemmon	Mount Lemmon Survey	·	840 m	MPC · JPL
386763	2010 CO_{114}	—	October 10, 2004	Kitt Peak	Spacewatch	MAS	960 m	MPC · JPL
386764	2010 CM_{128}	—	June 17, 2007	Kitt Peak	Spacewatch	·	2.5 km	MPC · JPL
386765	2010 CC_{144}	—	February 9, 2010	Catalina	CSS	·	2.2 km	MPC · JPL
386766	2010 CB_{148}	—	February 13, 2010	Mount Lemmon	Mount Lemmon Survey	·	1.6 km	MPC · JPL
386767	2010 CR_{160}	—	November 27, 2009	Mount Lemmon	Mount Lemmon Survey	·	2.7 km	MPC · JPL
386768	2010 CJ_{169}	—	February 9, 2010	Kitt Peak	Spacewatch	KON	1.9 km	MPC · JPL
386769	2010 CB_{180}	—	February 15, 2010	Catalina	CSS	·	2.4 km	MPC · JPL
386770	2010 CS_{180}	—	February 9, 2010	Kitt Peak	Spacewatch	MIS	2.0 km	MPC · JPL
386771	2010 CJ_{185}	—	February 14, 2010	Catalina	CSS	·	2.2 km	MPC · JPL
386772	2010 CA_{223}	—	February 8, 2010	WISE	WISE	·	3.5 km	MPC · JPL
386773	2010 CB_{223}	—	April 15, 2010	Kitt Peak	Spacewatch	·	2.6 km	MPC · JPL
386774	2010 CK_{225}	—	February 8, 2010	WISE	WISE	·	4.7 km	MPC · JPL
386775	2010 CJ_{231}	—	January 31, 2009	Kitt Peak	Spacewatch	EOS	2.0 km	MPC · JPL
386776	2010 DQ_{6}	—	February 16, 2010	Kitt Peak	Spacewatch	(5)	1 km	MPC · JPL
386777	2010 DZ_{21}	—	February 16, 2010	Mount Lemmon	Mount Lemmon Survey	·	2.6 km	MPC · JPL
386778	2010 DF_{24}	—	February 19, 2010	WISE	WISE	·	3.7 km	MPC · JPL
386779	2010 DS_{42}	—	February 17, 2010	Kitt Peak	Spacewatch	JUN	1.1 km	MPC · JPL
386780	2010 DR_{45}	—	October 19, 2008	Kitt Peak	Spacewatch	·	1.2 km	MPC · JPL
386781	2010 DN_{48}	—	September 29, 2008	Mount Lemmon	Mount Lemmon Survey	·	1.4 km	MPC · JPL
386782	2010 DG_{49}	—	February 18, 2010	Catalina	CSS	·	1.8 km	MPC · JPL
386783	2010 DK_{74}	—	February 18, 2010	Kitt Peak	Spacewatch	HNS	1.3 km	MPC · JPL
386784	2010 EY_{18}	—	March 8, 2010	WISE	WISE	·	4.5 km	MPC · JPL
386785	2010 EM_{21}	—	March 4, 2010	Kitt Peak	Spacewatch	·	1.8 km	MPC · JPL
386786	2010 ER_{21}	—	March 4, 2010	Kitt Peak	Spacewatch	·	1.9 km	MPC · JPL
386787	2010 ES_{35}	—	March 10, 2010	La Sagra	OAM	ADE	2.6 km	MPC · JPL
386788	2010 EA_{38}	—	March 12, 2010	Mount Lemmon	Mount Lemmon Survey	·	1.4 km	MPC · JPL
386789	2010 EW_{38}	—	March 5, 2010	Catalina	CSS	·	2.1 km	MPC · JPL
386790	2010 EZ_{69}	—	March 13, 2010	Črni Vrh	Skvarč, J.	·	2.4 km	MPC · JPL
386791	2010 EB_{70}	—	March 14, 2010	Catalina	CSS	·	1.6 km	MPC · JPL
386792	2010 EP_{90}	—	March 23, 2006	Kitt Peak	Spacewatch	·	1.3 km	MPC · JPL
386793	2010 EG_{104}	—	June 14, 2007	Kitt Peak	Spacewatch	EUN	1.6 km	MPC · JPL
386794	2010 EV_{104}	—	March 13, 2010	Catalina	CSS	·	2.3 km	MPC · JPL
386795	2010 EW_{105}	—	February 9, 1997	Kitt Peak	Spacewatch	(5)	1.5 km	MPC · JPL
386796	2010 EW_{111}	—	September 28, 2003	Kitt Peak	Spacewatch	·	1.4 km	MPC · JPL
386797	2010 EW_{112}	—	March 13, 2010	Kitt Peak	Spacewatch	·	2.2 km	MPC · JPL
386798	2010 EM_{113}	—	March 14, 2010	La Sagra	OAM	·	2.3 km	MPC · JPL
386799	2010 ES_{122}	—	March 15, 2010	Kitt Peak	Spacewatch	·	1.2 km	MPC · JPL
386800	2010 EJ_{129}	—	March 13, 2005	Kitt Peak	Spacewatch	·	2.1 km	MPC · JPL

== 386801–386900 ==
back to top

Designation			Discovery			Properties		Ref
Permanent	Provisional	Named after	Date	Site	Discoverer(s)	Category	Diam.	Ref
386801	2010 ER_{130}	—	October 2, 2003	Kitt Peak	Spacewatch	MRX	1.1 km	MPC · JPL
386802	2010 EA_{139}	—	March 14, 2010	Catalina	CSS	·	1.4 km	MPC · JPL
386803	2010 EV_{140}	—	March 13, 2010	Kitt Peak	Spacewatch	·	1.7 km	MPC · JPL
386804	2010 EL_{147}	—	November 13, 2007	Mount Lemmon	Mount Lemmon Survey	EMA	3.8 km	MPC · JPL
386805	2010 FX_{2}	—	February 18, 2010	Kitt Peak	Spacewatch	·	1.6 km	MPC · JPL
386806	2010 FY_{4}	—	March 16, 2010	Mount Lemmon	Mount Lemmon Survey	EUN	1.3 km	MPC · JPL
386807	2010 FL_{5}	—	September 13, 2007	Mount Lemmon	Mount Lemmon Survey	·	1.8 km	MPC · JPL
386808	2010 FU_{20}	—	December 18, 2004	Mount Lemmon	Mount Lemmon Survey	·	1.8 km	MPC · JPL
386809	2010 FE_{21}	—	June 22, 2007	Kitt Peak	Spacewatch	·	1.6 km	MPC · JPL
386810	2010 FK_{24}	—	March 18, 2010	Kitt Peak	Spacewatch	HOF	2.5 km	MPC · JPL
386811	2010 FX_{26}	—	March 20, 2010	Kitt Peak	Spacewatch	·	1.3 km	MPC · JPL
386812	2010 FZ_{28}	—	March 19, 2010	Kitt Peak	Spacewatch	·	1.8 km	MPC · JPL
386813	2010 FG_{57}	—	March 18, 2010	Kitt Peak	Spacewatch	MIS	2.1 km	MPC · JPL
386814	2010 FH_{87}	—	March 18, 2010	Kitt Peak	Spacewatch	·	2.1 km	MPC · JPL
386815	2010 FN_{94}	—	February 9, 2005	Kitt Peak	Spacewatch	·	1.7 km	MPC · JPL
386816	2010 GP_{23}	—	April 5, 2010	Sandlot	G. Hug	DOR	2.8 km	MPC · JPL
386817	2010 GN_{24}	—	October 11, 2007	Mount Lemmon	Mount Lemmon Survey	·	3.0 km	MPC · JPL
386818	2010 GB_{27}	—	April 5, 2010	Kitt Peak	Spacewatch	·	1.9 km	MPC · JPL
386819	2010 GR_{29}	—	April 8, 2010	Purple Mountain	PMO NEO Survey Program	·	1.9 km	MPC · JPL
386820	2010 GK_{33}	—	April 10, 2010	Plana	Fratev, F.	·	1.1 km	MPC · JPL
386821	2010 GS_{62}	—	April 6, 2010	Catalina	CSS	·	2.1 km	MPC · JPL
386822	2010 GY_{99}	—	April 4, 2010	Catalina	CSS	·	1.8 km	MPC · JPL
386823	2010 GX_{106}	—	March 12, 2010	Kitt Peak	Spacewatch	·	1.7 km	MPC · JPL
386824	2010 GS_{120}	—	October 24, 2003	Kitt Peak	Spacewatch	NEM	2.8 km	MPC · JPL
386825	2010 GJ_{124}	—	May 8, 2005	Mount Lemmon	Mount Lemmon Survey	·	1.7 km	MPC · JPL
386826	2010 GL_{126}	—	April 10, 2010	Kitt Peak	Spacewatch	·	1.4 km	MPC · JPL
386827	2010 GQ_{140}	—	April 8, 2010	Kitt Peak	Spacewatch	·	2.0 km	MPC · JPL
386828	2010 GY_{143}	—	April 10, 2010	Mount Lemmon	Mount Lemmon Survey	EOS	2.0 km	MPC · JPL
386829	2010 GG_{161}	—	April 9, 2010	Catalina	CSS	·	2.7 km	MPC · JPL
386830	2010 GV_{172}	—	February 16, 2001	Kitt Peak	Spacewatch	·	2.5 km	MPC · JPL
386831	2010 HX_{56}	—	March 15, 2009	Kitt Peak	Spacewatch	·	3.8 km	MPC · JPL
386832	2010 HU_{58}	—	April 25, 2010	WISE	WISE	L5	8.6 km	MPC · JPL
386833	2010 HE_{103}	—	April 20, 2010	Mount Lemmon	Mount Lemmon Survey	·	3.3 km	MPC · JPL
386834	2010 JM_{31}	—	April 9, 2010	Kitt Peak	Spacewatch	·	3.1 km	MPC · JPL
386835	2010 JG_{34}	—	May 6, 2010	Catalina	CSS	JUN	1.6 km	MPC · JPL
386836	2010 JO_{39}	—	January 27, 2003	Anderson Mesa	LONEOS	ARM	4.6 km	MPC · JPL
386837	2010 JT_{72}	—	January 25, 2009	Kitt Peak	Spacewatch	·	2.8 km	MPC · JPL
386838	2010 JJ_{73}	—	February 9, 2005	Kitt Peak	Spacewatch	AEO	1.4 km	MPC · JPL
386839	2010 JK_{85}	—	January 31, 2009	Mount Lemmon	Mount Lemmon Survey	·	3.3 km	MPC · JPL
386840	2010 JX_{106}	—	May 12, 2010	WISE	WISE	THB	4.2 km	MPC · JPL
386841	2010 JW_{110}	—	February 14, 2010	Mount Lemmon	Mount Lemmon Survey	·	2.0 km	MPC · JPL
386842	2010 JQ_{117}	—	May 7, 2010	Kitt Peak	Spacewatch	HYG	3.9 km	MPC · JPL
386843	2010 JB_{170}	—	May 12, 2010	Kitt Peak	Spacewatch	·	3.1 km	MPC · JPL
386844	2010 JL_{177}	—	February 29, 2000	Socorro	LINEAR	BRA	1.9 km	MPC · JPL
386845	2010 JZ_{177}	—	December 10, 2004	Kitt Peak	Spacewatch	·	2.5 km	MPC · JPL
386846	2010 KS_{14}	—	May 17, 2010	WISE	WISE	T_{j} (2.99) · EUP	4.4 km	MPC · JPL
386847	2010 LR_{33}	—	June 6, 2010	WISE	WISE	APO +1km · PHA	660 m	MPC · JPL
386848	2010 LG_{110}	—	September 14, 2006	Kitt Peak	Spacewatch	THM	2.5 km	MPC · JPL
386849	2010 LC_{128}	—	March 13, 2010	Catalina	CSS	ADE	1.7 km	MPC · JPL
386850	2010 MM	—	December 29, 2008	Mount Lemmon	Mount Lemmon Survey	·	3.5 km	MPC · JPL
386851 Streep	2010 ME_{75}	Streep	June 26, 2010	WISE	WISE	·	2.8 km	MPC · JPL
386852	2010 PQ_{66}	—	August 14, 2010	Socorro	LINEAR	H	660 m	MPC · JPL
386853	2010 UM_{79}	—	September 7, 2008	Mount Lemmon	Mount Lemmon Survey	L4	7.9 km	MPC · JPL
386854	2010 UT_{79}	—	September 5, 2008	Kitt Peak	Spacewatch	L4	8.6 km	MPC · JPL
386855	2010 UT_{96}	—	March 25, 2006	Kitt Peak	Spacewatch	·	1.2 km	MPC · JPL
386856	2010 XZ_{7}	—	November 12, 2010	Mount Lemmon	Mount Lemmon Survey	L4	9.9 km	MPC · JPL
386857	2010 XR_{39}	—	January 22, 2006	Catalina	CSS	H	620 m	MPC · JPL
386858	2010 XS_{63}	—	August 18, 2009	Kitt Peak	Spacewatch	·	2.3 km	MPC · JPL
386859	2011 AB_{23}	—	December 5, 2007	Catalina	CSS	H	760 m	MPC · JPL
386860	2011 BD_{13}	—	August 23, 2001	Anderson Mesa	LONEOS	H	480 m	MPC · JPL
386861	2011 DX_{5}	—	December 10, 2010	Mount Lemmon	Mount Lemmon Survey	·	880 m	MPC · JPL
386862	2011 DR_{8}	—	December 15, 2006	Kitt Peak	Spacewatch	·	1.0 km	MPC · JPL
386863	2011 DB_{13}	—	August 20, 2009	Kitt Peak	Spacewatch	V	640 m	MPC · JPL
386864	2011 DQ_{19}	—	August 28, 2009	Kitt Peak	Spacewatch	·	660 m	MPC · JPL
386865	2011 DE_{20}	—	February 23, 2011	Catalina	CSS	PHO	1.4 km	MPC · JPL
386866	2011 EX_{9}	—	August 30, 2005	Kitt Peak	Spacewatch	·	660 m	MPC · JPL
386867	2011 EB_{39}	—	February 10, 2011	Mount Lemmon	Mount Lemmon Survey	·	600 m	MPC · JPL
386868	2011 EF_{42}	—	October 19, 2006	Kitt Peak	Spacewatch	·	790 m	MPC · JPL
386869	2011 EC_{45}	—	April 4, 2008	Kitt Peak	Spacewatch	·	600 m	MPC · JPL
386870	2011 EE_{53}	—	January 24, 2007	Mount Lemmon	Mount Lemmon Survey	·	850 m	MPC · JPL
386871	2011 EJ_{70}	—	October 23, 2006	Mount Lemmon	Mount Lemmon Survey	(883)	760 m	MPC · JPL
386872	2011 FK_{4}	—	June 2, 2008	Mount Lemmon	Mount Lemmon Survey	·	740 m	MPC · JPL
386873	2011 FR_{5}	—	November 17, 2009	Mount Lemmon	Mount Lemmon Survey	·	1.8 km	MPC · JPL
386874	2011 FT_{5}	—	December 27, 2006	Mount Lemmon	Mount Lemmon Survey	·	930 m	MPC · JPL
386875	2011 FR_{8}	—	February 3, 1997	Kitt Peak	Spacewatch	·	760 m	MPC · JPL
386876	2011 FG_{13}	—	October 18, 2009	Mount Lemmon	Mount Lemmon Survey	·	730 m	MPC · JPL
386877	2011 FV_{24}	—	March 17, 2004	Kitt Peak	Spacewatch	·	720 m	MPC · JPL
386878	2011 FZ_{28}	—	November 22, 2006	Kitt Peak	Spacewatch	·	1.1 km	MPC · JPL
386879	2011 FS_{43}	—	January 30, 2004	Kitt Peak	Spacewatch	·	760 m	MPC · JPL
386880	2011 FU_{45}	—	January 10, 2007	Kitt Peak	Spacewatch	·	1.1 km	MPC · JPL
386881	2011 FW_{46}	—	March 28, 2004	Kitt Peak	Spacewatch	·	910 m	MPC · JPL
386882	2011 FV_{65}	—	September 20, 2008	Catalina	CSS	·	1.9 km	MPC · JPL
386883	2011 FM_{86}	—	November 23, 2006	Mount Lemmon	Mount Lemmon Survey	·	880 m	MPC · JPL
386884	2011 FS_{131}	—	October 4, 2002	Socorro	LINEAR	·	840 m	MPC · JPL
386885	2011 FJ_{144}	—	October 14, 2009	Mount Lemmon	Mount Lemmon Survey	·	970 m	MPC · JPL
386886	2011 FC_{149}	—	August 31, 2005	Kitt Peak	Spacewatch	·	960 m	MPC · JPL
386887	2011 GG_{22}	—	October 27, 2009	Mount Lemmon	Mount Lemmon Survey	·	1.5 km	MPC · JPL
386888	2011 GX_{25}	—	November 24, 2009	Kitt Peak	Spacewatch	·	650 m	MPC · JPL
386889	2011 GK_{31}	—	February 18, 2004	Kitt Peak	Spacewatch	·	660 m	MPC · JPL
386890	2011 GP_{56}	—	May 24, 2006	Mount Lemmon	Mount Lemmon Survey	·	3.7 km	MPC · JPL
386891	2011 GD_{58}	—	September 19, 2009	Mount Lemmon	Mount Lemmon Survey	·	980 m	MPC · JPL
386892	2011 GA_{72}	—	April 16, 2001	Kitt Peak	Spacewatch	·	750 m	MPC · JPL
386893	2011 GJ_{73}	—	December 21, 2006	Kitt Peak	Spacewatch	·	740 m	MPC · JPL
386894	2011 GK_{73}	—	January 22, 2004	Socorro	LINEAR	·	670 m	MPC · JPL
386895	2011 GZ_{75}	—	January 7, 2010	Mount Lemmon	Mount Lemmon Survey	·	4.6 km	MPC · JPL
386896	2011 GW_{79}	—	October 1, 2005	Mount Lemmon	Mount Lemmon Survey	·	770 m	MPC · JPL
386897	2011 GW_{84}	—	October 24, 2009	Kitt Peak	Spacewatch	·	650 m	MPC · JPL
386898	2011 HZ_{4}	—	December 20, 2009	Mount Lemmon	Mount Lemmon Survey	·	1.8 km	MPC · JPL
386899	2011 HP_{12}	—	October 7, 2008	Mount Lemmon	Mount Lemmon Survey	·	1.3 km	MPC · JPL
386900	2011 HF_{29}	—	May 15, 2004	Campo Imperatore	CINEOS	·	1.2 km	MPC · JPL

== 386901–387000 ==
back to top

Designation			Discovery			Properties		Ref
Permanent	Provisional	Named after	Date	Site	Discoverer(s)	Category	Diam.	Ref
386901	2011 HS_{29}	—	February 21, 2007	Mount Lemmon	Mount Lemmon Survey	NYS	1.1 km	MPC · JPL
386902	2011 HH_{33}	—	April 5, 2003	Kitt Peak	Spacewatch	·	1.3 km	MPC · JPL
386903	2011 HA_{41}	—	June 14, 2007	Kitt Peak	Spacewatch	·	1.2 km	MPC · JPL
386904	2011 HF_{44}	—	March 10, 2007	Kitt Peak	Spacewatch	·	1.2 km	MPC · JPL
386905	2011 HT_{50}	—	December 14, 2001	Socorro	LINEAR	PHO	1.1 km	MPC · JPL
386906	2011 HY_{51}	—	April 23, 2011	Kitt Peak	Spacewatch	TIR	3.2 km	MPC · JPL
386907	2011 HQ_{57}	—	January 10, 2007	Mount Lemmon	Mount Lemmon Survey	·	960 m	MPC · JPL
386908	2011 HU_{63}	—	April 13, 2011	Mount Lemmon	Mount Lemmon Survey	·	4.0 km	MPC · JPL
386909	2011 HG_{73}	—	September 5, 2007	Catalina	CSS	·	3.3 km	MPC · JPL
386910	2011 HV_{74}	—	April 27, 2011	Kitt Peak	Spacewatch	·	2.4 km	MPC · JPL
386911	2011 HY_{74}	—	December 31, 2002	Socorro	LINEAR	·	1.4 km	MPC · JPL
386912	2011 HD_{81}	—	November 17, 2006	Mount Lemmon	Mount Lemmon Survey	·	790 m	MPC · JPL
386913	2011 HU_{83}	—	September 27, 2009	Kitt Peak	Spacewatch	·	680 m	MPC · JPL
386914	2011 JY_{2}	—	April 24, 2011	Kitt Peak	Spacewatch	·	2.7 km	MPC · JPL
386915	2011 JK_{5}	—	October 9, 2008	Catalina	CSS	PHO	1.2 km	MPC · JPL
386916	2011 JX_{15}	—	January 17, 2007	Catalina	CSS	·	1.1 km	MPC · JPL
386917	2011 JX_{26}	—	March 20, 2010	WISE	WISE	·	2.5 km	MPC · JPL
386918	2011 JK_{28}	—	May 31, 2000	Kitt Peak	Spacewatch	MAS	740 m	MPC · JPL
386919	2011 KB_{3}	—	February 17, 2007	Mount Lemmon	Mount Lemmon Survey	·	1.1 km	MPC · JPL
386920	2011 KB_{4}	—	January 12, 2010	Mount Lemmon	Mount Lemmon Survey	·	4.3 km	MPC · JPL
386921	2011 KX_{7}	—	March 23, 2004	Socorro	LINEAR	·	830 m	MPC · JPL
386922	2011 KC_{10}	—	November 6, 2008	Catalina	CSS	·	2.1 km	MPC · JPL
386923	2011 KC_{13}	—	October 26, 2008	Mount Lemmon	Mount Lemmon Survey	EUN	1.5 km	MPC · JPL
386924	2011 KV_{28}	—	April 20, 2004	Kitt Peak	Spacewatch	·	870 m	MPC · JPL
386925	2011 KV_{31}	—	April 6, 2005	Catalina	CSS	·	4.2 km	MPC · JPL
386926	2011 KL_{34}	—	January 27, 2007	Kitt Peak	Spacewatch	·	830 m	MPC · JPL
386927	2011 LG_{2}	—	October 27, 2005	Kitt Peak	Spacewatch	·	1.0 km	MPC · JPL
386928	2011 LJ_{24}	—	March 15, 2007	Kitt Peak	Spacewatch	·	1.2 km	MPC · JPL
386929	2011 LN_{26}	—	September 17, 2006	Catalina	CSS	·	4.9 km	MPC · JPL
386930	2011 LV_{26}	—	January 1, 2009	Kitt Peak	Spacewatch	BRA	1.9 km	MPC · JPL
386931	2011 LW_{26}	—	February 22, 2007	Catalina	CSS	·	1 km	MPC · JPL
386932	2011 LJ_{28}	—	December 2, 2008	Kitt Peak	Spacewatch	·	1.5 km	MPC · JPL
386933	2011 NL_{3}	—	July 16, 2007	Siding Spring	SSS	·	2.7 km	MPC · JPL
386934	2011 OU	—	May 13, 2010	Mount Lemmon	Mount Lemmon Survey	URS	3.4 km	MPC · JPL
386935	2011 OE_{3}	—	September 11, 2007	Catalina	CSS	·	2.1 km	MPC · JPL
386936	2011 OC_{7}	—	October 26, 2008	Mount Lemmon	Mount Lemmon Survey	·	1.4 km	MPC · JPL
386937	2011 OM_{23}	—	May 17, 2010	WISE	WISE	ADE	3.8 km	MPC · JPL
386938	2011 OX_{43}	—	September 27, 2008	Mount Lemmon	Mount Lemmon Survey	NYS	1.3 km	MPC · JPL
386939	2011 OA_{49}	—	January 27, 2000	Kitt Peak	Spacewatch	·	3.3 km	MPC · JPL
386940	2011 OZ_{58}	—	June 27, 2011	Mount Lemmon	Mount Lemmon Survey	·	2.4 km	MPC · JPL
386941	2011 PJ_{10}	—	September 19, 2006	Catalina	CSS	·	3.3 km	MPC · JPL
386942	2011 QT_{17}	—	December 17, 2007	Kitt Peak	Spacewatch	·	2.7 km	MPC · JPL
386943	2011 QJ_{36}	—	September 17, 2006	Kitt Peak	Spacewatch	·	3.0 km	MPC · JPL
386944	2011 QO_{43}	—	September 16, 2006	Catalina	CSS	·	3.6 km	MPC · JPL
386945	2011 QR_{57}	—	March 8, 1997	Kitt Peak	Spacewatch	·	3.2 km	MPC · JPL
386946	2011 QD_{92}	—	June 19, 2006	Mount Lemmon	Mount Lemmon Survey	MRX	1.2 km	MPC · JPL
386947	2011 QC_{95}	—	December 29, 2003	Kitt Peak	Spacewatch	·	2.6 km	MPC · JPL
386948	2011 QT_{96}	—	September 26, 2006	Kitt Peak	Spacewatch	VER	2.5 km	MPC · JPL
386949	2011 ST_{27}	—	September 28, 2006	Catalina	CSS	EOS	2.7 km	MPC · JPL
386950	2011 SO_{65}	—	March 26, 2003	Kitt Peak	Spacewatch	EOS	2.6 km	MPC · JPL
386951	2011 SL_{74}	—	May 16, 2004	Kitt Peak	Spacewatch	·	3.6 km	MPC · JPL
386952	2011 SN_{127}	—	September 20, 2011	Kitt Peak	Spacewatch	·	4.5 km	MPC · JPL
386953	2011 SM_{130}	—	September 14, 2005	Kitt Peak	Spacewatch	·	3.0 km	MPC · JPL
386954	2011 SG_{164}	—	October 1, 2005	Catalina	CSS	·	4.0 km	MPC · JPL
386955	2011 SS_{184}	—	September 1, 2005	Kitt Peak	Spacewatch	HYG	2.8 km	MPC · JPL
386956	2011 SU_{195}	—	October 3, 2006	Mount Lemmon	Mount Lemmon Survey	·	2.7 km	MPC · JPL
386957	2011 SY_{207}	—	December 20, 2007	Mount Lemmon	Mount Lemmon Survey	·	3.7 km	MPC · JPL
386958	2011 SE_{208}	—	May 4, 2006	Siding Spring	SSS	JUN	1.3 km	MPC · JPL
386959	2011 ST_{211}	—	March 7, 2003	Kitt Peak	Spacewatch	·	4.4 km	MPC · JPL
386960	2011 SL_{222}	—	June 17, 2005	Mount Lemmon	Mount Lemmon Survey	·	4.2 km	MPC · JPL
386961	2011 SN_{237}	—	April 25, 2004	Kitt Peak	Spacewatch	THM	2.8 km	MPC · JPL
386962	2011 SD_{239}	—	February 27, 2009	Mount Lemmon	Mount Lemmon Survey	·	3.1 km	MPC · JPL
386963	2011 UF_{34}	—	August 30, 2005	Kitt Peak	Spacewatch	·	3.2 km	MPC · JPL
386964	2011 UN_{105}	—	February 6, 2003	Kitt Peak	Spacewatch	·	3.6 km	MPC · JPL
386965	2011 UP_{211}	—	December 31, 2007	Kitt Peak	Spacewatch	·	2.8 km	MPC · JPL
386966	2011 WC_{51}	—	August 18, 2009	Kitt Peak	Spacewatch	L4	7.9 km	MPC · JPL
386967	2011 YS_{34}	—	February 2, 2001	Kitt Peak	Spacewatch	L4 · (8060)	7.8 km	MPC · JPL
386968	2012 BR_{61}	—	December 30, 2008	Kitt Peak	Spacewatch	centaur	80 km	MPC · JPL
386969	2012 GJ	—	April 22, 2007	Mount Lemmon	Mount Lemmon Survey	H	590 m	MPC · JPL
386970	2012 HN_{15}	—	April 20, 2007	Kitt Peak	Spacewatch	H	460 m	MPC · JPL
386971	2012 JU_{25}	—	March 8, 2006	Mount Lemmon	Mount Lemmon Survey	H	620 m	MPC · JPL
386972	2012 JD_{65}	—	August 9, 2007	Socorro	LINEAR	·	3.7 km	MPC · JPL
386973	2012 KR_{41}	—	May 2, 2008	Mount Lemmon	Mount Lemmon Survey	·	1.4 km	MPC · JPL
386974	2012 LX_{6}	—	May 24, 2006	Kitt Peak	Spacewatch	·	3.5 km	MPC · JPL
386975	2012 LQ_{18}	—	October 12, 2005	Kitt Peak	Spacewatch	H	630 m	MPC · JPL
386976	2012 LY_{25}	—	September 16, 2009	Catalina	CSS	·	680 m	MPC · JPL
386977	2012 MK_{4}	—	March 29, 2011	Kitt Peak	Spacewatch	·	1.9 km	MPC · JPL
386978	2012 MA_{10}	—	September 20, 2008	Catalina	CSS	·	1.8 km	MPC · JPL
386979	2012 OW_{4}	—	May 29, 2008	Kitt Peak	Spacewatch	·	810 m	MPC · JPL
386980	2012 PG_{17}	—	October 19, 2001	Kitt Peak	Spacewatch	NYS	1.2 km	MPC · JPL
386981	2012 PK_{17}	—	January 14, 2010	Mount Lemmon	Mount Lemmon Survey	·	1.4 km	MPC · JPL
386982	2012 PW_{19}	—	February 8, 2007	Kitt Peak	Spacewatch	·	1.1 km	MPC · JPL
386983	2012 PB_{30}	—	March 13, 2007	Mount Lemmon	Mount Lemmon Survey	·	2.1 km	MPC · JPL
386984	2012 PR_{32}	—	September 5, 2005	Siding Spring	SSS	PHO	1.2 km	MPC · JPL
386985	2012 PC_{33}	—	February 12, 2004	Kitt Peak	Spacewatch	·	840 m	MPC · JPL
386986	2012 PR_{34}	—	May 13, 2007	Mount Lemmon	Mount Lemmon Survey	·	1.8 km	MPC · JPL
386987	2012 QK_{19}	—	March 10, 2007	Mount Lemmon	Mount Lemmon Survey	EUN	1.1 km	MPC · JPL
386988	2012 QR_{20}	—	December 25, 2005	Kitt Peak	Spacewatch	·	1.1 km	MPC · JPL
386989	2012 QC_{21}	—	August 24, 1998	Socorro	LINEAR	·	2.0 km	MPC · JPL
386990	2012 QC_{26}	—	July 25, 2008	Mount Lemmon	Mount Lemmon Survey	PHO	1.1 km	MPC · JPL
386991	2012 QA_{27}	—	September 30, 2007	Kitt Peak	Spacewatch	·	2.2 km	MPC · JPL
386992	2012 QE_{29}	—	May 20, 2006	Mount Lemmon	Mount Lemmon Survey	·	2.3 km	MPC · JPL
386993	2012 QK_{34}	—	January 19, 2005	Kitt Peak	Spacewatch	·	1.7 km	MPC · JPL
386994	2012 QB_{38}	—	August 4, 2008	Siding Spring	SSS	V	840 m	MPC · JPL
386995	2012 QC_{38}	—	October 6, 2008	Kitt Peak	Spacewatch	·	1.4 km	MPC · JPL
386996	2012 QN_{40}	—	February 2, 2006	Mount Lemmon	Mount Lemmon Survey	·	2.0 km	MPC · JPL
386997	2012 QN_{41}	—	September 24, 2008	Catalina	CSS	·	1.7 km	MPC · JPL
386998	2012 QY_{44}	—	November 30, 2005	Mount Lemmon	Mount Lemmon Survey	·	2.1 km	MPC · JPL
386999	2012 QY_{50}	—	August 4, 2008	Siding Spring	SSS	·	1.6 km	MPC · JPL
387000	2012 RZ_{2}	—	January 31, 2009	Kitt Peak	Spacewatch	·	3.0 km	MPC · JPL

back to top

== See also ==
- Meanings of minor-planet names: 386001–387000
