= Meanings of minor-planet names: 386001–387000 =

As minor planet discoveries are confirmed, they are given a permanent number by the IAU's Minor Planet Center (MPC), and the discoverers can then submit names for them, following the IAU's naming conventions. The list below concerns those minor planets in the specified number-range that have received names, and explains the meanings of those names.

Official naming citations of newly named small Solar System bodies are approved and published in a bulletin by IAU's Working Group for Small Bodies Nomenclature (WGSBN). Before May 2021, citations were published in MPC's Minor Planet Circulars for many decades. Recent citations can also be found on the JPL Small-Body Database (SBDB). Until his death in 2016, German astronomer Lutz D. Schmadel compiled these citations into the Dictionary of Minor Planet Names (DMP) and regularly updated the collection.

Based on Paul Herget's The Names of the Minor Planets, Schmadel also researched the unclear origin of numerous asteroids, most of which had been named prior to World War II. This article incorporates text from this source, which is in the public domain: SBDB New namings may only be added to this list below after official publication as the preannouncement of names is condemned. The WGSBN publishes a comprehensive guideline for the naming rules of non-cometary small Solar System bodies.

== 386001–386100 ==
Named minor planet	Provisional	This minor planet was named for...	Ref · Catalog
386056 Tauragė	2007 FV_{35}	Tauragė, an industrial city in Lithuania, and the capital of Tauragė County.	IAU · 386056

== 386101–386200 ==
back to top

Named minor planet	Provisional	This minor planet was named for...	Ref · Catalog
There are no named minor planets in this number range

== 386201–386300 ==
back to top

Named minor planet	Provisional	This minor planet was named for...	Ref · Catalog
There are no named minor planets in this number range

== 386301–386400 ==
back to top

Named minor planet	Provisional	This minor planet was named for...	Ref · Catalog
There are no named minor planets in this number range

== 386401–386500 ==
back to top

Named minor planet	Provisional	This minor planet was named for...	Ref · Catalog
There are no named minor planets in this number range

== 386501–386600 ==
back to top

Named minor planet	Provisional	This minor planet was named for...	Ref · Catalog
386528 Walterfürtig	2009 CB_{5}	Walter Fürtig (b. 1933), an astronomer at the Sonneberg Observatory, Germany.	IAU · 386528

== 386601–386700 ==
back to top

Named minor planet	Provisional	This minor planet was named for...	Ref · Catalog
386618 Accomazzo	2009 RD_{26}	Andrea Accomazzo (born 1970), Italian aerospace engineer who led the Rosetta mission to comet 67P/Churyumov–Gerasimenko.	JPL · 386618
386622 New Zealand	2009 SA_{1}	New Zealand, a country comprising two main islands, and numerous smaller islands, situated in the Southwest Pacific Ocean. It is also known as Aotearoa (land of the long white cloud) by the indigenous Māori people.	JPL · 386622

== 386701–386800 ==
back to top

Named minor planet	Provisional	This minor planet was named for...	Ref · Catalog
There are no named minor planets in this number range

== 386801–386900 ==
back to top

Named minor planet	Provisional	This minor planet was named for...	Ref · Catalog
386851 Streep	2010 ME_{75}	Meryl Streep (b. 1949) is a celebrated American actress who has starred in dozens of films, receiving numerous nominations and three Academy Awards. She was awarded the Presidential Medal of Freedom and a lifetime achievement award from the American Film Institute. She is an outspoken advocate for women.	IAU · 386851

== 386901–387000 ==
back to top

Named minor planet	Provisional	This minor planet was named for...	Ref · Catalog
There are no named minor planets in this number range

back to top

Preceded by 385,001–386,000	Meanings of minor-planet names List of minor planets: 386,001–387,000	Succeeded by 387,001–388,000
