= Meanings of minor-planet names: 385001–386000 =

As minor planet discoveries are confirmed, they are given a permanent number by the IAU's Minor Planet Center (MPC), and the discoverers can then submit names for them, following the IAU's naming conventions. The list below concerns those minor planets in the specified number-range that have received names, and explains the meanings of those names.

Official naming citations of newly named small Solar System bodies are approved and published in a bulletin by IAU's Working Group for Small Bodies Nomenclature (WGSBN). Before May 2021, citations were published in MPC's Minor Planet Circulars for many decades. Recent citations can also be found on the JPL Small-Body Database (SBDB). Until his death in 2016, German astronomer Lutz D. Schmadel compiled these citations into the Dictionary of Minor Planet Names (DMP) and regularly updated the collection.

Based on Paul Herget's The Names of the Minor Planets, Schmadel also researched the unclear origin of numerous asteroids, most of which had been named prior to World War II. This article incorporates text from this source, which is in the public domain: SBDB New namings may only be added to this list below after official publication as the preannouncement of names is condemned. The WGSBN publishes a comprehensive guideline for the naming rules of non-cometary small Solar System bodies.

== 385001–385100 ==
Named minor planet	Provisional	This minor planet was named for...	Ref · Catalog
There are no named minor planets in this number range

== 385101–385200 ==
back to top

Named minor planet	Provisional	This minor planet was named for...	Ref · Catalog
There are no named minor planets in this number range

== 385201–385300 ==
back to top

Named minor planet	Provisional	This minor planet was named for...	Ref · Catalog
385205 Michelvancamp	1999 SU_{28}	Michel Van Camp (born 1969), Belgian physicist and head of the Seismology-Gravimetry service at the Royal Observatory of Belgium in Brussels. His research includes gravimetry, intraplate deformations and hydrological effects on gravity (Src).	IAU · 385205

== 385301–385400 ==
back to top

Named minor planet	Provisional	This minor planet was named for...	Ref · Catalog
There are no named minor planets in this number range

== 385401–385500 ==
back to top

Named minor planet	Provisional	This minor planet was named for...	Ref · Catalog
385446 Manwë	2003 QW_{111}	Manwë is foremost among the deities who rule the world in the mythology created by Tolkien.	JPL · 385446

== 385501–385600 ==
back to top

Named minor planet	Provisional	This minor planet was named for...	Ref · Catalog
385571 Otrera	2004 UP_{10}	Otrera, the first queen of the Amazons. She was involved with Ares and was the mother of the Amazons queen Penthesilea, who led the Amazons in the Trojan war.	JPL · 385571

== 385601–385700 ==
back to top

Named minor planet	Provisional	This minor planet was named for...	Ref · Catalog
385695 Clete	2005 TO_{74}	Clete was an Amazon and the attendant to the Amazons queen Penthesilea, who led the Amazons in the Trojan war. Clete went looking for Penthesilea after she went missing after the Trojan War.	JPL · 385695

== 385701–385800 ==
back to top

Named minor planet	Provisional	This minor planet was named for...	Ref · Catalog
There are no named minor planets in this number range

== 385801–385900 ==
back to top

Named minor planet	Provisional	This minor planet was named for...	Ref · Catalog
There are no named minor planets in this number range

== 385901–386000 ==
back to top

Named minor planet	Provisional	This minor planet was named for...	Ref · Catalog
385980 Emiliosegrè	2007 AA_{8}	Emilio Segrè (1905–1989) was an Italian-American physicist and 1959 Nobel Prize laureate for discovery of the antiproton. He also discovered the elements technetium and astatine.	IAU · 385980

back to top

Preceded by 384,001–385,000	Meanings of minor-planet names List of minor planets: 385,001–386,000	Succeeded by 386,001–387,000
