= List of minor planets: 385001–386000 =

The following is a partial list of minor planets, running from minor-planet number 385001 through 386000, inclusive. The primary data for this and other partial lists is based on JPL's "Small-Body Orbital Elements" and data available from the Minor Planet Center. Critical list information is also provided by the MPC, unless otherwise specified from Lowell Observatory. A detailed description of the table's columns and additional sources are given on the main page including a complete list of every page in this series, and a statistical break-up on the dynamical classification of minor planets.

Also see the summary list of all named bodies in numerical and alphabetical order, and the corresponding naming citations for the number range of this particular list. New namings may only be added to this list after official publication, as the preannouncement of names is condemned by the Working Group for Small Bodies Nomenclature of the International Astronomical Union.

Near-Earth obj.	MBA (inner)	MBA (outer)	Centaur
Mars-crosser	MBA (middle)	Jupiter trojan	Trans-Neptunian obj.
Unclassified

== 385001–385100 ==
Designation			Discovery			Properties		Ref
Permanent	Provisional	Named after	Date	Site	Discoverer(s)	Category	Diam.	Ref
385001	2012 TZ_{229}	—	November 20, 2001	Kitt Peak	Spacewatch	·	3.6 km	MPC · JPL
385002	2012 TG_{230}	—	November 16, 2003	Kitt Peak	Spacewatch	·	2.0 km	MPC · JPL
385003	2012 TL_{231}	—	October 6, 1999	Socorro	LINEAR	·	1.7 km	MPC · JPL
385004	2012 TX_{231}	—	September 16, 2001	Socorro	LINEAR	EOS	2.8 km	MPC · JPL
385005	2012 TH_{234}	—	November 1, 2008	Mount Lemmon	Mount Lemmon Survey	·	2.5 km	MPC · JPL
385006	2012 TJ_{234}	—	October 29, 2003	Kitt Peak	Spacewatch	AGN	1.4 km	MPC · JPL
385007	2012 TZ_{234}	—	November 19, 2008	Kitt Peak	Spacewatch	PAD	3.2 km	MPC · JPL
385008	2012 TT_{236}	—	May 26, 2006	Mount Lemmon	Mount Lemmon Survey	·	2.6 km	MPC · JPL
385009	2012 TE_{238}	—	April 24, 2006	Kitt Peak	Spacewatch	HOF	2.6 km	MPC · JPL
385010	2012 TJ_{239}	—	September 19, 2006	Catalina	CSS	·	3.7 km	MPC · JPL
385011	2012 TU_{239}	—	September 19, 2007	Kitt Peak	Spacewatch	KOR	1.4 km	MPC · JPL
385012	2012 TD_{244}	—	October 10, 2007	Mount Lemmon	Mount Lemmon Survey	·	2.3 km	MPC · JPL
385013	2012 TC_{246}	—	March 14, 2010	Mount Lemmon	Mount Lemmon Survey	·	2.2 km	MPC · JPL
385014	2012 TH_{266}	—	September 29, 2003	Kitt Peak	Spacewatch	AGN	1.2 km	MPC · JPL
385015	2012 TO_{266}	—	February 1, 2005	Kitt Peak	Spacewatch	·	2.2 km	MPC · JPL
385016	2012 TU_{266}	—	November 4, 2007	Mount Lemmon	Mount Lemmon Survey	·	2.6 km	MPC · JPL
385017	2012 TZ_{266}	—	September 5, 1999	Kitt Peak	Spacewatch	·	1.7 km	MPC · JPL
385018	2012 TX_{268}	—	October 18, 2003	Kitt Peak	Spacewatch	·	1.9 km	MPC · JPL
385019	2012 TG_{272}	—	February 3, 2000	Kitt Peak	Spacewatch	AST	1.6 km	MPC · JPL
385020	2012 TV_{277}	—	September 15, 2007	Kitt Peak	Spacewatch	·	2.3 km	MPC · JPL
385021	2012 TQ_{282}	—	November 22, 2009	Mount Lemmon	Mount Lemmon Survey	·	2.0 km	MPC · JPL
385022	2012 TM_{284}	—	April 30, 2006	Kitt Peak	Spacewatch	NEM	2.4 km	MPC · JPL
385023	2012 TA_{285}	—	November 2, 2007	Kitt Peak	Spacewatch	·	3.1 km	MPC · JPL
385024	2012 TM_{286}	—	September 20, 2001	Socorro	LINEAR	·	2.7 km	MPC · JPL
385025	2012 TS_{288}	—	September 27, 2006	Catalina	CSS	EOS	2.2 km	MPC · JPL
385026	2012 TZ_{288}	—	December 30, 2007	Kitt Peak	Spacewatch	CYB	4.5 km	MPC · JPL
385027	2012 TJ_{289}	—	August 21, 2006	Kitt Peak	Spacewatch	VER	2.6 km	MPC · JPL
385028	2012 TJ_{291}	—	October 24, 2008	Kitt Peak	Spacewatch	·	1.9 km	MPC · JPL
385029	2012 TU_{296}	—	May 3, 2010	Kitt Peak	Spacewatch	·	3.4 km	MPC · JPL
385030	2012 TS_{299}	—	November 21, 2008	Mount Lemmon	Mount Lemmon Survey	·	1.8 km	MPC · JPL
385031	2012 TM_{302}	—	September 30, 2006	Mount Lemmon	Mount Lemmon Survey	·	2.9 km	MPC · JPL
385032	2012 TL_{303}	—	March 1, 2009	Mount Lemmon	Mount Lemmon Survey	·	4.0 km	MPC · JPL
385033	2012 TV_{305}	—	October 17, 2003	Kitt Peak	Spacewatch	·	2.2 km	MPC · JPL
385034	2012 TW_{305}	—	February 10, 2010	Kitt Peak	Spacewatch	·	1.5 km	MPC · JPL
385035	2012 TD_{306}	—	October 23, 1995	Kitt Peak	Spacewatch	·	3.1 km	MPC · JPL
385036	2012 TB_{307}	—	November 30, 1999	Kitt Peak	Spacewatch	(11882)	1.8 km	MPC · JPL
385037	2012 TE_{309}	—	October 18, 2003	Anderson Mesa	LONEOS	·	2.2 km	MPC · JPL
385038	2012 TQ_{309}	—	September 29, 2003	Kitt Peak	Spacewatch	AGN	1.3 km	MPC · JPL
385039	2012 TQ_{310}	—	October 17, 2001	Socorro	LINEAR	·	3.1 km	MPC · JPL
385040	2012 TL_{311}	—	October 19, 2003	Kitt Peak	Spacewatch	·	1.9 km	MPC · JPL
385041	2012 TZ_{312}	—	April 2, 2005	Kitt Peak	Spacewatch	·	2.8 km	MPC · JPL
385042	2012 TO_{313}	—	April 14, 2004	Kitt Peak	Spacewatch	·	3.1 km	MPC · JPL
385043	2012 TC_{323}	—	April 18, 1996	Kitt Peak	Spacewatch	·	1.7 km	MPC · JPL
385044	2012 UH_{10}	—	January 28, 2007	Mount Lemmon	Mount Lemmon Survey	NYS	1.6 km	MPC · JPL
385045	2012 UP_{12}	—	August 24, 2007	Kitt Peak	Spacewatch	·	1.6 km	MPC · JPL
385046	2012 UX_{14}	—	September 14, 2007	Mount Lemmon	Mount Lemmon Survey	EOS	2.4 km	MPC · JPL
385047	2012 UU_{17}	—	April 22, 1998	Kitt Peak	Spacewatch	(5)	1.2 km	MPC · JPL
385048	2012 UZ_{22}	—	October 23, 2006	Kitt Peak	Spacewatch	·	3.3 km	MPC · JPL
385049	2012 UA_{26}	—	November 30, 2008	Kitt Peak	Spacewatch	·	2.3 km	MPC · JPL
385050	2012 UB_{26}	—	March 23, 2004	Kitt Peak	Spacewatch	·	3.1 km	MPC · JPL
385051	2012 UT_{28}	—	December 25, 2005	Mount Lemmon	Mount Lemmon Survey	·	1.8 km	MPC · JPL
385052	2012 UM_{35}	—	October 15, 1995	Kitt Peak	Spacewatch	VER	3.1 km	MPC · JPL
385053	2012 UB_{37}	—	November 4, 1996	Kitt Peak	Spacewatch	·	1.6 km	MPC · JPL
385054	2012 UM_{41}	—	February 20, 2006	Kitt Peak	Spacewatch	MIS	3.3 km	MPC · JPL
385055	2012 UY_{42}	—	April 13, 2004	Kitt Peak	Spacewatch	·	2.6 km	MPC · JPL
385056	2012 UV_{44}	—	October 13, 2007	Mount Lemmon	Mount Lemmon Survey	·	2.5 km	MPC · JPL
385057	2012 UR_{45}	—	September 17, 2006	Kitt Peak	Spacewatch	·	3.3 km	MPC · JPL
385058	2012 US_{45}	—	September 17, 2006	Catalina	CSS	URS	3.5 km	MPC · JPL
385059	2012 UK_{47}	—	September 19, 2001	Socorro	LINEAR	·	2.3 km	MPC · JPL
385060	2012 UC_{48}	—	March 29, 2009	Mount Lemmon	Mount Lemmon Survey	SYL · CYB	4.4 km	MPC · JPL
385061	2012 UQ_{50}	—	September 19, 2007	Kitt Peak	Spacewatch	·	2.3 km	MPC · JPL
385062	2012 UP_{56}	—	October 25, 2001	Kitt Peak	Spacewatch	·	2.3 km	MPC · JPL
385063	2012 UD_{57}	—	November 6, 1996	Kitt Peak	Spacewatch	·	3.0 km	MPC · JPL
385064	2012 UP_{60}	—	November 3, 2007	Kitt Peak	Spacewatch	EOS	2.2 km	MPC · JPL
385065	2012 UV_{61}	—	September 12, 2007	Mount Lemmon	Mount Lemmon Survey	·	2.0 km	MPC · JPL
385066	2012 UC_{63}	—	December 13, 2009	Mount Lemmon	Mount Lemmon Survey	·	1.1 km	MPC · JPL
385067	2012 UG_{63}	—	December 19, 2001	Kitt Peak	Spacewatch	·	4.5 km	MPC · JPL
385068	2012 UW_{64}	—	March 27, 2003	Palomar	NEAT	·	1.6 km	MPC · JPL
385069	2012 UF_{67}	—	April 2, 2006	Kitt Peak	Spacewatch	·	1.6 km	MPC · JPL
385070	2012 UH_{69}	—	April 30, 1997	Kitt Peak	Spacewatch	·	2.4 km	MPC · JPL
385071	2012 UN_{74}	—	December 31, 2008	Mount Lemmon	Mount Lemmon Survey	·	2.8 km	MPC · JPL
385072	2012 UT_{77}	—	October 14, 2001	Socorro	LINEAR	·	3.9 km	MPC · JPL
385073	2012 UA_{81}	—	November 30, 2008	Kitt Peak	Spacewatch	·	1.7 km	MPC · JPL
385074	2012 UM_{85}	—	November 20, 2007	Mount Lemmon	Mount Lemmon Survey	·	2.8 km	MPC · JPL
385075	2012 UJ_{86}	—	November 1, 1999	Kitt Peak	Spacewatch	·	2.4 km	MPC · JPL
385076	2012 UV_{93}	—	December 5, 2007	Kitt Peak	Spacewatch	·	3.6 km	MPC · JPL
385077	2012 UD_{97}	—	October 24, 2008	Catalina	CSS	·	1.6 km	MPC · JPL
385078	2012 UH_{101}	—	February 20, 2009	Kitt Peak	Spacewatch	·	2.6 km	MPC · JPL
385079	2012 US_{105}	—	March 4, 2005	Kitt Peak	Spacewatch	·	2.2 km	MPC · JPL
385080	2012 UX_{112}	—	April 26, 2003	Kitt Peak	Spacewatch	·	1.3 km	MPC · JPL
385081	2012 UY_{113}	—	September 30, 2006	Mount Lemmon	Mount Lemmon Survey	HYG	2.5 km	MPC · JPL
385082	2012 UU_{114}	—	March 7, 2005	Socorro	LINEAR	·	2.0 km	MPC · JPL
385083	2012 UD_{115}	—	September 12, 2001	Kitt Peak	Spacewatch	·	2.2 km	MPC · JPL
385084	2012 UY_{159}	—	November 15, 2007	Catalina	CSS	·	2.3 km	MPC · JPL
385085	2012 UV_{160}	—	November 11, 2001	Kitt Peak	Spacewatch	·	3.0 km	MPC · JPL
385086	2012 UX_{162}	—	November 21, 2008	Kitt Peak	Spacewatch	·	1.3 km	MPC · JPL
385087	2012 UB_{163}	—	November 9, 1996	Kitt Peak	Spacewatch	·	2.0 km	MPC · JPL
385088	2012 UW_{166}	—	June 24, 2011	Mount Lemmon	Mount Lemmon Survey	·	4.3 km	MPC · JPL
385089	2012 UG_{171}	—	May 5, 2010	WISE	WISE	·	4.8 km	MPC · JPL
385090	2012 VF	—	November 9, 2008	Mount Lemmon	Mount Lemmon Survey	·	2.0 km	MPC · JPL
385091	2012 VG_{3}	—	November 30, 2005	Mount Lemmon	Mount Lemmon Survey	3:2 · SHU	5.6 km	MPC · JPL
385092	2012 VZ_{3}	—	January 11, 1997	Kitt Peak	Spacewatch	·	4.1 km	MPC · JPL
385093	2012 VA_{11}	—	September 10, 2007	Mount Lemmon	Mount Lemmon Survey	·	2.0 km	MPC · JPL
385094	2012 VS_{26}	—	December 28, 2003	Kitt Peak	Spacewatch	KOR	1.6 km	MPC · JPL
385095	2012 VM_{27}	—	October 31, 2008	Kitt Peak	Spacewatch	·	1.9 km	MPC · JPL
385096	2012 VL_{36}	—	September 13, 2007	Mount Lemmon	Mount Lemmon Survey	·	1.8 km	MPC · JPL
385097	2012 VX_{41}	—	March 9, 2005	Mount Lemmon	Mount Lemmon Survey	·	3.7 km	MPC · JPL
385098	2012 VE_{47}	—	April 26, 2006	Kitt Peak	Spacewatch	·	2.1 km	MPC · JPL
385099	2012 VM_{47}	—	May 12, 2005	Kitt Peak	Spacewatch	·	2.4 km	MPC · JPL
385100	2012 VG_{48}	—	September 27, 2008	Mount Lemmon	Mount Lemmon Survey	·	1.8 km	MPC · JPL

== 385101–385200 ==
back to top

Designation			Discovery			Properties		Ref
Permanent	Provisional	Named after	Date	Site	Discoverer(s)	Category	Diam.	Ref
385101	2012 VH_{66}	—	October 4, 2007	Kitt Peak	Spacewatch	KOR	1.4 km	MPC · JPL
385102	2012 VJ_{67}	—	November 3, 2007	Kitt Peak	Spacewatch	·	1.7 km	MPC · JPL
385103	2012 VP_{78}	—	September 15, 2006	Kitt Peak	Spacewatch	·	2.4 km	MPC · JPL
385104	2012 VL_{80}	—	February 1, 2005	Kitt Peak	Spacewatch	·	2.2 km	MPC · JPL
385105	2012 VT_{89}	—	June 19, 2007	Kitt Peak	Spacewatch	·	1.6 km	MPC · JPL
385106	2012 VG_{92}	—	February 23, 2007	Mount Lemmon	Mount Lemmon Survey	3:2	5.0 km	MPC · JPL
385107	2012 VM_{92}	—	November 12, 1996	Prescott	P. G. Comba	T_{j} (2.99) · 3:2 · SHU	5.2 km	MPC · JPL
385108	2012 VL_{93}	—	December 18, 1995	Kitt Peak	Spacewatch	·	1.9 km	MPC · JPL
385109	2012 VQ_{97}	—	May 3, 2006	Siding Spring	SSS	·	4.4 km	MPC · JPL
385110	2012 VE_{99}	—	April 13, 2004	Kitt Peak	Spacewatch	·	3.4 km	MPC · JPL
385111	2012 VX_{105}	—	April 14, 2010	Kitt Peak	Spacewatch	·	3.0 km	MPC · JPL
385112	2012 VC_{107}	—	August 29, 2006	Catalina	CSS	·	2.7 km	MPC · JPL
385113	2012 VG_{107}	—	March 26, 2006	Mount Lemmon	Mount Lemmon Survey	·	2.0 km	MPC · JPL
385114	2012 WS_{26}	—	September 6, 1999	Kitt Peak	Spacewatch	·	2.1 km	MPC · JPL
385115	2012 XQ_{1}	—	April 14, 2004	Kitt Peak	Spacewatch	·	2.7 km	MPC · JPL
385116	2012 XC_{10}	—	December 18, 2001	Socorro	LINEAR	·	1.6 km	MPC · JPL
385117	2012 XX_{11}	—	December 23, 2000	Kitt Peak	Spacewatch	·	1.7 km	MPC · JPL
385118	2012 XW_{52}	—	December 5, 2007	Mount Lemmon	Mount Lemmon Survey	HOF	3.6 km	MPC · JPL
385119	2012 XA_{63}	—	January 23, 2006	Kitt Peak	Spacewatch	V	900 m	MPC · JPL
385120	2012 XX_{67}	—	December 4, 2007	Kitt Peak	Spacewatch	VER	3.7 km	MPC · JPL
385121	2012 XT_{95}	—	September 20, 2006	Catalina	CSS	·	3.3 km	MPC · JPL
385122	2012 XQ_{113}	—	January 12, 1996	Kitt Peak	Spacewatch	·	2.1 km	MPC · JPL
385123	2012 XW_{120}	—	October 7, 2008	Mount Lemmon	Mount Lemmon Survey	·	1.8 km	MPC · JPL
385124	2012 XV_{153}	—	February 14, 2010	Mount Lemmon	Mount Lemmon Survey	·	2.3 km	MPC · JPL
385125	2013 AH_{121}	—	February 9, 2008	Kitt Peak	Spacewatch	HYG · fast	3.4 km	MPC · JPL
385126	2013 AG_{155}	—	March 24, 2003	Kitt Peak	Spacewatch	EOS	2.3 km	MPC · JPL
385127	2013 BL_{60}	—	January 16, 2005	Kitt Peak	Spacewatch	3:2	7.4 km	MPC · JPL
385128	2013 CH_{121}	—	April 25, 2003	Anderson Mesa	LONEOS	·	6.0 km	MPC · JPL
385129	2013 CC_{215}	—	February 14, 2002	Kitt Peak	Spacewatch	L4	8.7 km	MPC · JPL
385130	2013 GH_{79}	—	February 28, 2006	Mount Lemmon	Mount Lemmon Survey	3:2	8.6 km	MPC · JPL
385131	2013 GH_{109}	—	March 12, 2007	Catalina	CSS	T_{j} (2.92)	4.7 km	MPC · JPL
385132	2013 RO_{31}	—	May 3, 2008	Siding Spring	SSS	EUN	1.8 km	MPC · JPL
385133	2013 RC_{53}	—	October 27, 2005	Catalina	CSS	·	1.3 km	MPC · JPL
385134	2013 SB_{24}	—	March 28, 2008	Mount Lemmon	Mount Lemmon Survey	·	1.6 km	MPC · JPL
385135	2013 SC_{30}	—	October 19, 1995	Kitt Peak	Spacewatch	·	2.2 km	MPC · JPL
385136	2013 SF_{51}	—	October 9, 2004	Kitt Peak	Spacewatch	·	2.3 km	MPC · JPL
385137	2013 SN_{51}	—	September 4, 2002	Campo Imperatore	CINEOS	·	4.1 km	MPC · JPL
385138	2013 SA_{67}	—	October 9, 2004	Socorro	LINEAR	DOR	3.1 km	MPC · JPL
385139	2013 SW_{86}	—	August 31, 2002	Kitt Peak	Spacewatch	·	940 m	MPC · JPL
385140	2013 SX_{86}	—	November 28, 2005	Catalina	CSS	MAR	1.7 km	MPC · JPL
385141	2013 TG_{3}	—	December 2, 2004	Kitt Peak	Spacewatch	·	1.9 km	MPC · JPL
385142	2013 TO_{3}	—	April 20, 2007	Mount Lemmon	Mount Lemmon Survey	·	2.0 km	MPC · JPL
385143	2013 TT_{7}	—	March 13, 1999	Kitt Peak	Spacewatch	·	2.1 km	MPC · JPL
385144	2013 TY_{13}	—	November 24, 2000	Anderson Mesa	LONEOS	·	760 m	MPC · JPL
385145	2013 TD_{19}	—	August 16, 2002	Kitt Peak	Spacewatch	·	3.4 km	MPC · JPL
385146	2013 TV_{24}	—	September 3, 2008	Kitt Peak	Spacewatch	·	1.9 km	MPC · JPL
385147	2013 TP_{26}	—	November 17, 2006	Mount Lemmon	Mount Lemmon Survey	·	1.5 km	MPC · JPL
385148	2013 TA_{32}	—	January 31, 2004	Kitt Peak	Spacewatch	THM	3.1 km	MPC · JPL
385149	2013 TP_{35}	—	January 31, 2006	Siding Spring	SSS	slow	1.8 km	MPC · JPL
385150	2013 TS_{38}	—	July 3, 2008	Catalina	CSS	·	3.0 km	MPC · JPL
385151	2013 TQ_{45}	—	May 22, 2006	Kitt Peak	Spacewatch	·	3.3 km	MPC · JPL
385152	2013 TF_{49}	—	March 15, 2004	Kitt Peak	Spacewatch	HYG	3.0 km	MPC · JPL
385153	2013 TV_{49}	—	July 9, 2005	Kitt Peak	Spacewatch	MAS	740 m	MPC · JPL
385154	2013 TR_{89}	—	September 17, 2006	Catalina	CSS	·	680 m	MPC · JPL
385155	2013 TE_{90}	—	October 10, 2004	Kitt Peak	Spacewatch	·	1.7 km	MPC · JPL
385156	2013 TM_{92}	—	October 1, 2000	Socorro	LINEAR	·	2.8 km	MPC · JPL
385157	2013 TX_{94}	—	November 3, 2004	Kitt Peak	Spacewatch	GEF	1.7 km	MPC · JPL
385158	2013 TP_{120}	—	March 13, 2007	Mount Lemmon	Mount Lemmon Survey	WIT	1.5 km	MPC · JPL
385159	2013 TR_{130}	—	April 10, 2005	Mount Lemmon	Mount Lemmon Survey	URS	4.2 km	MPC · JPL
385160	2013 UW_{4}	—	December 27, 2005	Mount Lemmon	Mount Lemmon Survey	·	2.1 km	MPC · JPL
385161	2013 UV_{5}	—	September 5, 2008	Kitt Peak	Spacewatch	DOR	3.2 km	MPC · JPL
385162	2013 UH_{11}	—	July 27, 2009	Kitt Peak	Spacewatch	·	1.4 km	MPC · JPL
385163	2013 UN_{12}	—	November 6, 1999	Catalina	CSS	·	3.2 km	MPC · JPL
385164	2013 UT_{12}	—	April 19, 2007	Mount Lemmon	Mount Lemmon Survey	·	2.8 km	MPC · JPL
385165	2013 VM	—	November 21, 2009	Catalina	CSS	·	1.8 km	MPC · JPL
385166	2013 VA_{1}	—	June 17, 1998	Kitt Peak	Spacewatch	·	1.4 km	MPC · JPL
385167	2013 VF_{5}	—	November 6, 2005	Catalina	CSS	H	620 m	MPC · JPL
385168	2013 VN_{8}	—	May 10, 2005	Kitt Peak	Spacewatch	·	1.1 km	MPC · JPL
385169	2013 VR_{8}	—	September 18, 2003	Kitt Peak	Spacewatch	·	590 m	MPC · JPL
385170	2013 VL_{11}	—	December 19, 2003	Socorro	LINEAR	·	3.9 km	MPC · JPL
385171	2013 VD_{16}	—	December 5, 2002	Socorro	LINEAR	MAS	750 m	MPC · JPL
385172	2013 VD_{18}	—	December 1, 2003	Kitt Peak	Spacewatch	·	660 m	MPC · JPL
385173	2013 VH_{18}	—	October 27, 2005	Kitt Peak	Spacewatch	·	1.2 km	MPC · JPL
385174	2013 WL_{2}	—	March 14, 2010	WISE	WISE	·	2.3 km	MPC · JPL
385175	2013 WU_{3}	—	May 7, 2007	Kitt Peak	Spacewatch	EUN	1.5 km	MPC · JPL
385176	2013 WU_{5}	—	December 2, 2008	Mount Lemmon	Mount Lemmon Survey	·	2.7 km	MPC · JPL
385177	2013 WB_{12}	—	June 3, 2008	Kitt Peak	Spacewatch	·	1.6 km	MPC · JPL
385178	2013 WX_{28}	—	September 13, 2007	Mount Lemmon	Mount Lemmon Survey	·	2.4 km	MPC · JPL
385179	2013 WK_{45}	—	September 11, 2005	Kitt Peak	Spacewatch	H	620 m	MPC · JPL
385180	2013 WH_{53}	—	December 10, 2004	Socorro	LINEAR	·	3.1 km	MPC · JPL
385181	2013 WE_{56}	—	August 26, 2000	Socorro	LINEAR	·	1.9 km	MPC · JPL
385182	2013 WX_{65}	—	July 30, 2008	Mount Lemmon	Mount Lemmon Survey	·	2.4 km	MPC · JPL
385183	2013 XH	—	October 13, 2005	Kitt Peak	Spacewatch	(5)	1.9 km	MPC · JPL
385184	4119 T-3	—	October 16, 1977	Palomar	C. J. van Houten, I. van Houten-Groeneveld, T. Gehrels	·	1.4 km	MPC · JPL
385185	1993 RO	—	September 14, 1993	Mauna Kea	D. C. Jewitt, J. X. Luu	plutino	130 km	MPC · JPL
385186	1994 AW_{1}	—	January 11, 1994	Palomar	K. J. Lawrence, E. F. Helin	AMO +1km · PHA · moon	810 m	MPC · JPL
385187	1995 SL_{19}	—	September 18, 1995	Kitt Peak	Spacewatch	·	1.2 km	MPC · JPL
385188	1995 ST_{49}	—	September 25, 1995	Kitt Peak	Spacewatch	·	710 m	MPC · JPL
385189	1996 BZ_{11}	—	January 16, 1996	Kitt Peak	Spacewatch	·	1.2 km	MPC · JPL
385190	1996 XK_{2}	—	December 4, 1996	Prescott	P. G. Comba	TIR	3.1 km	MPC · JPL
385191	1997 RT_{5}	—	September 7, 1997	Palomar	P. Nicholson, B. Gladman, J. A. Burns	cubewano (hot)	183 km	MPC · JPL
385192	1997 TR_{12}	—	October 2, 1997	Kitt Peak	Spacewatch	·	2.0 km	MPC · JPL
385193	1998 BT_{3}	—	January 18, 1998	Kitt Peak	Spacewatch	·	1.9 km	MPC · JPL
385194	1998 KG_{62}	—	May 29, 1998	Cerro Tololo	Bernstein, G.	cubewano (cold)	165 km	MPC · JPL
385195	1999 FW_{76}	—	March 20, 1999	Apache Point	SDSS	H	450 m	MPC · JPL
385196	1999 FL_{89}	—	March 21, 1999	Apache Point	SDSS	·	1.4 km	MPC · JPL
385197	1999 KV_{5}	—	May 17, 1999	Kitt Peak	Spacewatch	EOS	2.0 km	MPC · JPL
385198	1999 NO_{37}	—	July 14, 1999	Socorro	LINEAR	·	2.4 km	MPC · JPL
385199	1999 OE_{4}	—	July 20, 1999	Mauna Kea	Mauna Kea	cubewano (cold)	181 km	MPC · JPL
385200	1999 RB_{25}	—	September 7, 1999	Socorro	LINEAR	·	970 m	MPC · JPL

== 385201–385300 ==
back to top

Designation			Discovery			Properties		Ref
Permanent	Provisional	Named after	Date	Site	Discoverer(s)	Category	Diam.	Ref
385201	1999 RN_{215}	—	September 7, 1999	Mauna Kea	D. C. Jewitt, J. X. Luu, C. A. Trujillo	cubewano (hot)	238 km	MPC · JPL
385202	1999 RJ_{246}	—	September 7, 1999	Anderson Mesa	LONEOS	·	1.3 km	MPC · JPL
385203	1999 SO_{15}	—	September 30, 1999	Catalina	CSS	·	870 m	MPC · JPL
385204	1999 SY_{23}	—	September 30, 1999	Kitt Peak	Spacewatch	H	660 m	MPC · JPL
385205 Michelvancamp	1999 SU_{28}	Michelvancamp	September 21, 1999	Uccle	T. Pauwels	·	710 m	MPC · JPL
385206	1999 TM_{10}	—	October 11, 1999	Prescott	P. G. Comba	·	690 m	MPC · JPL
385207	1999 TY_{45}	—	October 3, 1999	Kitt Peak	Spacewatch	·	580 m	MPC · JPL
385208	1999 TS_{110}	—	October 4, 1999	Socorro	LINEAR	·	2.2 km	MPC · JPL
385209	1999 TN_{141}	—	October 6, 1999	Socorro	LINEAR	·	770 m	MPC · JPL
385210	1999 TD_{146}	—	October 7, 1999	Socorro	LINEAR	·	670 m	MPC · JPL
385211	1999 TG_{212}	—	October 15, 1999	Socorro	LINEAR	·	1.5 km	MPC · JPL
385212	1999 TA_{250}	—	October 9, 1999	Catalina	CSS	H	660 m	MPC · JPL
385213	1999 VN_{152}	—	November 10, 1999	Kitt Peak	Spacewatch	(883)	850 m	MPC · JPL
385214	1999 VW_{166}	—	November 14, 1999	Socorro	LINEAR	·	1.0 km	MPC · JPL
385215	2000 AR_{92}	—	January 2, 2000	Socorro	LINEAR	PHO	1.5 km	MPC · JPL
385216	2000 DB_{9}	—	February 26, 2000	Kitt Peak	Spacewatch	·	600 m	MPC · JPL
385217	2000 DF_{17}	—	February 29, 2000	Socorro	LINEAR	·	1.1 km	MPC · JPL
385218	2000 DS_{32}	—	February 29, 2000	Socorro	LINEAR	·	660 m	MPC · JPL
385219	2000 DB_{41}	—	February 29, 2000	Socorro	LINEAR	·	2.6 km	MPC · JPL
385220	2000 DM_{57}	—	February 29, 2000	Socorro	LINEAR	·	860 m	MPC · JPL
385221	2000 DT_{88}	—	February 25, 2000	Kitt Peak	Spacewatch	·	2.3 km	MPC · JPL
385222	2000 DR_{90}	—	February 27, 2000	Kitt Peak	Spacewatch	·	2.5 km	MPC · JPL
385223	2000 EJ_{176}	—	March 3, 2000	Kitt Peak	Spacewatch	·	690 m	MPC · JPL
385224	2000 FE_{10}	—	March 30, 2000	Kitt Peak	Spacewatch	NYS	760 m	MPC · JPL
385225	2000 GE_{121}	—	April 5, 2000	Kitt Peak	Spacewatch	·	720 m	MPC · JPL
385226	2000 GH_{153}	—	April 6, 2000	Anderson Mesa	LONEOS	·	2.0 km	MPC · JPL
385227	2000 JV_{67}	—	May 6, 2000	Kitt Peak	Spacewatch	·	2.1 km	MPC · JPL
385228	2000 KV_{33}	—	May 29, 2000	Prescott	P. G. Comba	MAS	880 m	MPC · JPL
385229	2000 PK_{18}	—	August 1, 2000	Socorro	LINEAR	·	3.8 km	MPC · JPL
385230	2000 QO_{109}	—	August 31, 2000	Kitt Peak	Spacewatch	·	3.0 km	MPC · JPL
385231	2000 QQ_{117}	—	August 31, 2000	Socorro	LINEAR	·	1.5 km	MPC · JPL
385232	2000 QQ_{227}	—	August 31, 2000	Socorro	LINEAR	·	1.3 km	MPC · JPL
385233	2000 SZ_{183}	—	September 20, 2000	Haleakala	NEAT	·	1.7 km	MPC · JPL
385234	2000 SK_{213}	—	September 25, 2000	Socorro	LINEAR	·	1.4 km	MPC · JPL
385235	2000 SA_{216}	—	September 26, 2000	Socorro	LINEAR	·	990 m	MPC · JPL
385236	2000 SF_{258}	—	September 24, 2000	Socorro	LINEAR	RAF	1.0 km	MPC · JPL
385237	2000 SQ_{281}	—	September 23, 2000	Socorro	LINEAR	·	1.3 km	MPC · JPL
385238	2000 SX_{286}	—	September 26, 2000	Socorro	LINEAR	·	1.4 km	MPC · JPL
385239	2000 SG_{289}	—	September 27, 2000	Socorro	LINEAR	(5)	1.4 km	MPC · JPL
385240	2000 SW_{363}	—	September 20, 2000	Socorro	LINEAR	·	1.3 km	MPC · JPL
385241	2000 UE_{65}	—	October 25, 2000	Socorro	LINEAR	(5)	1.4 km	MPC · JPL
385242	2000 UZ_{89}	—	October 31, 2000	Socorro	LINEAR	·	3.4 km	MPC · JPL
385243	2000 VW_{45}	—	November 2, 2000	Socorro	LINEAR	ADE	2.9 km	MPC · JPL
385244	2000 WQ	—	November 16, 2000	Socorro	LINEAR	·	1.9 km	MPC · JPL
385245	2000 WK_{2}	—	November 16, 2000	Socorro	LINEAR	·	2.0 km	MPC · JPL
385246	2000 WS_{150}	—	November 19, 2000	Socorro	LINEAR	BAR	1.5 km	MPC · JPL
385247	2000 YD_{67}	—	December 26, 2000	Haleakala	NEAT	·	1.5 km	MPC · JPL
385248	2001 BH_{79}	—	January 4, 2001	Kitt Peak	Spacewatch	·	1.8 km	MPC · JPL
385249	2001 CU_{43}	—	February 15, 2001	Socorro	LINEAR	PHO	900 m	MPC · JPL
385250	2001 DH_{47}	—	February 20, 2001	Socorro	LINEAR	·	500 m	MPC · JPL
385251	2001 DD_{82}	—	February 22, 2001	Kitt Peak	Spacewatch	·	650 m	MPC · JPL
385252	2001 EB_{18}	—	March 1, 2001	Socorro	LINEAR	APO · PHA	470 m	MPC · JPL
385253	2001 FM_{128}	—	March 29, 2001	Anderson Mesa	LONEOS	·	2.1 km	MPC · JPL
385254	2001 FO_{188}	—	March 16, 2001	Socorro	LINEAR	·	3.4 km	MPC · JPL
385255	2001 KC_{79}	—	May 22, 2001	Cerro Tololo	Deep Ecliptic Survey	·	1.1 km	MPC · JPL
385256	2001 OU_{3}	—	July 18, 2001	Palomar	NEAT	H	670 m	MPC · JPL
385257	2001 OS_{33}	—	July 19, 2001	Palomar	NEAT	·	2.9 km	MPC · JPL
385258	2001 ON_{43}	—	July 22, 2001	Palomar	NEAT	·	3.0 km	MPC · JPL
385259	2001 PP_{9}	—	August 12, 2001	Ondřejov	P. Kušnirák	NYS	1.1 km	MPC · JPL
385260	2001 QK_{112}	—	August 25, 2001	Socorro	LINEAR	·	2.7 km	MPC · JPL
385261	2001 QS_{158}	—	August 23, 2001	Anderson Mesa	LONEOS	·	1.4 km	MPC · JPL
385262	2001 QT_{162}	—	August 23, 2001	Anderson Mesa	LONEOS	H	790 m	MPC · JPL
385263	2001 QB_{190}	—	August 22, 2001	Socorro	LINEAR	TIR	4.0 km	MPC · JPL
385264	2001 QX_{202}	—	August 23, 2001	Anderson Mesa	LONEOS	·	1.5 km	MPC · JPL
385265	2001 QC_{205}	—	August 23, 2001	Anderson Mesa	LONEOS	·	1.9 km	MPC · JPL
385266	2001 QB_{298}	—	August 20, 2001	Cerro Tololo	M. W. Buie	cubewano (cold)	196 km	MPC · JPL
385267	2001 QS_{330}	—	August 27, 2001	Anderson Mesa	LONEOS	·	2.8 km	MPC · JPL
385268	2001 RC_{12}	—	September 10, 2001	Socorro	LINEAR	T_{j} (2.69) · AMO +1km	3.2 km	MPC · JPL
385269	2001 RU_{38}	—	September 9, 2001	Socorro	LINEAR	NYS	1.2 km	MPC · JPL
385270	2001 RV_{107}	—	September 12, 2001	Socorro	LINEAR	MAS	890 m	MPC · JPL
385271	2001 RT_{124}	—	September 12, 2001	Socorro	LINEAR	·	1.2 km	MPC · JPL
385272	2001 RH_{130}	—	September 12, 2001	Socorro	LINEAR	·	2.3 km	MPC · JPL
385273	2001 SR_{102}	—	September 20, 2001	Socorro	LINEAR	·	1.4 km	MPC · JPL
385274	2001 SV_{127}	—	September 16, 2001	Socorro	LINEAR	·	1.4 km	MPC · JPL
385275	2001 SY_{136}	—	September 16, 2001	Socorro	LINEAR	NYS	1.1 km	MPC · JPL
385276	2001 ST_{211}	—	September 19, 2001	Socorro	LINEAR	MAS	720 m	MPC · JPL
385277	2001 SM_{214}	—	September 19, 2001	Socorro	LINEAR	·	3.4 km	MPC · JPL
385278	2001 SC_{218}	—	September 19, 2001	Socorro	LINEAR	PHO	1.4 km	MPC · JPL
385279	2001 SD_{221}	—	September 19, 2001	Socorro	LINEAR	EOS	2.3 km	MPC · JPL
385280	2001 SO_{225}	—	September 19, 2001	Socorro	LINEAR	·	1.0 km	MPC · JPL
385281	2001 SA_{247}	—	September 19, 2001	Socorro	LINEAR	NYS	1.4 km	MPC · JPL
385282	2001 SB_{252}	—	September 19, 2001	Socorro	LINEAR	·	3.2 km	MPC · JPL
385283	2001 SS_{262}	—	September 24, 2001	Socorro	LINEAR	PHO	1.4 km	MPC · JPL
385284	2001 SA_{274}	—	September 20, 2001	Kitt Peak	Spacewatch	MAS	620 m	MPC · JPL
385285	2001 SN_{350}	—	September 23, 2001	Kitt Peak	Spacewatch	·	3.3 km	MPC · JPL
385286	2001 SA_{355}	—	September 20, 2001	Anderson Mesa	LONEOS	·	3.5 km	MPC · JPL
385287	2001 TY_{26}	—	October 14, 2001	Socorro	LINEAR	EUP	3.4 km	MPC · JPL
385288	2001 TP_{84}	—	October 14, 2001	Socorro	LINEAR	·	3.1 km	MPC · JPL
385289	2001 TH_{99}	—	September 19, 2001	Kitt Peak	Spacewatch	·	3.1 km	MPC · JPL
385290	2001 TC_{137}	—	October 14, 2001	Palomar	NEAT	·	1.0 km	MPC · JPL
385291	2001 TM_{159}	—	October 11, 2001	Palomar	NEAT	·	2.9 km	MPC · JPL
385292	2001 TJ_{170}	—	October 13, 2001	Palomar	NEAT	·	1.2 km	MPC · JPL
385293	2001 TO_{235}	—	August 26, 2001	Anderson Mesa	LONEOS	·	2.9 km	MPC · JPL
385294	2001 UN_{77}	—	October 17, 2001	Socorro	LINEAR	THB	2.9 km	MPC · JPL
385295	2001 UY_{86}	—	October 18, 2001	Kitt Peak	Spacewatch	·	2.7 km	MPC · JPL
385296	2001 UA_{129}	—	October 20, 2001	Socorro	LINEAR	MAS	890 m	MPC · JPL
385297	2001 UY_{139}	—	October 23, 2001	Socorro	LINEAR	·	1.1 km	MPC · JPL
385298	2001 UP_{174}	—	October 18, 2001	Palomar	NEAT	MAS	730 m	MPC · JPL
385299	2001 UA_{181}	—	October 25, 2001	Palomar	NEAT	NYS	940 m	MPC · JPL
385300	2001 UB_{221}	—	October 21, 2001	Socorro	LINEAR	·	3.8 km	MPC · JPL

== 385301–385400 ==
back to top

Designation			Discovery			Properties		Ref
Permanent	Provisional	Named after	Date	Site	Discoverer(s)	Category	Diam.	Ref
385301	2001 UU_{226}	—	October 16, 2001	Palomar	NEAT	·	2.4 km	MPC · JPL
385302	2001 UQ_{228}	—	October 16, 2001	Palomar	NEAT	·	1.1 km	MPC · JPL
385303	2001 VQ_{49}	—	November 10, 2001	Socorro	LINEAR	·	1.2 km	MPC · JPL
385304	2001 VU_{71}	—	November 12, 2001	Socorro	LINEAR	·	4.2 km	MPC · JPL
385305	2001 VK_{73}	—	October 24, 2001	Socorro	LINEAR	THM	2.1 km	MPC · JPL
385306	2001 VJ_{89}	—	November 12, 2001	Socorro	LINEAR	EOS	2.5 km	MPC · JPL
385307	2001 VQ_{112}	—	November 12, 2001	Socorro	LINEAR	NYS	1.2 km	MPC · JPL
385308	2001 VO_{130}	—	November 11, 2001	Apache Point	SDSS	·	2.8 km	MPC · JPL
385309	2001 WF_{16}	—	November 17, 2001	Socorro	LINEAR	·	3.2 km	MPC · JPL
385310	2001 XS_{122}	—	December 14, 2001	Socorro	LINEAR	·	1.9 km	MPC · JPL
385311	2001 XP_{200}	—	December 15, 2001	Socorro	LINEAR	·	1.4 km	MPC · JPL
385312	2001 XA_{232}	—	December 15, 2001	Socorro	LINEAR	·	1.1 km	MPC · JPL
385313	2001 XV_{244}	—	December 15, 2001	Socorro	LINEAR	·	1.1 km	MPC · JPL
385314	2001 YH_{28}	—	December 18, 2001	Socorro	LINEAR	·	1.4 km	MPC · JPL
385315	2001 YC_{62}	—	December 18, 2001	Socorro	LINEAR	·	1.7 km	MPC · JPL
385316	2001 YY_{66}	—	December 18, 2001	Socorro	LINEAR	·	1.8 km	MPC · JPL
385317	2001 YT_{76}	—	December 18, 2001	Socorro	LINEAR	·	1.3 km	MPC · JPL
385318	2001 YT_{138}	—	December 18, 2001	Kitt Peak	Spacewatch	·	930 m	MPC · JPL
385319	2001 YM_{149}	—	December 19, 2001	Palomar	NEAT	·	3.8 km	MPC · JPL
385320	2002 AL_{66}	—	January 12, 2002	Socorro	LINEAR	·	1.2 km	MPC · JPL
385321	2002 AX_{141}	—	December 14, 2001	Kitt Peak	Spacewatch	·	2.4 km	MPC · JPL
385322	2002 AE_{177}	—	January 14, 2002	Socorro	LINEAR	·	1.1 km	MPC · JPL
385323	2002 CH_{4}	—	February 6, 2002	Socorro	LINEAR	·	1.6 km	MPC · JPL
385324	2002 CJ_{5}	—	February 4, 2002	Palomar	NEAT	·	1.3 km	MPC · JPL
385325	2002 CK_{25}	—	February 8, 2002	Socorro	LINEAR	·	270 m	MPC · JPL
385326	2002 CK_{41}	—	February 7, 2002	Palomar	NEAT	·	3.5 km	MPC · JPL
385327	2002 CK_{58}	—	February 9, 2002	Kitt Peak	Spacewatch	·	2.2 km	MPC · JPL
385328	2002 CF_{188}	—	February 10, 2002	Socorro	LINEAR	MAR	1.0 km	MPC · JPL
385329	2002 CQ_{245}	—	February 13, 2002	Kitt Peak	Spacewatch	·	1.6 km	MPC · JPL
385330	2002 CL_{269}	—	February 7, 2002	Kitt Peak	M. W. Buie	L4	10 km	MPC · JPL
385331	2002 CJ_{316}	—	February 7, 2002	Palomar	NEAT	RAF	1.0 km	MPC · JPL
385332	2002 FA_{26}	—	March 19, 2002	Palomar	NEAT	·	2.0 km	MPC · JPL
385333	2002 GH_{6}	—	April 13, 2002	Palomar	NEAT	·	1.5 km	MPC · JPL
385334	2002 GA_{106}	—	April 11, 2002	Anderson Mesa	LONEOS	·	2.1 km	MPC · JPL
385335	2002 GS_{128}	—	April 12, 2002	Socorro	LINEAR	·	1.0 km	MPC · JPL
385336	2002 GX_{145}	—	April 12, 2002	Socorro	LINEAR	JUN	1.1 km	MPC · JPL
385337	2002 GH_{182}	—	April 5, 2002	Palomar	NEAT	·	1.8 km	MPC · JPL
385338	2002 JJ_{10}	—	May 6, 2002	Socorro	LINEAR	·	1.6 km	MPC · JPL
385339	2002 JH_{44}	—	May 9, 2002	Socorro	LINEAR	·	1.5 km	MPC · JPL
385340	2002 JZ_{115}	—	May 11, 2002	La Palma	La Palma	L4	13 km	MPC · JPL
385341	2002 JW_{121}	—	May 5, 2002	Palomar	NEAT	·	1.7 km	MPC · JPL
385342	2002 LL	—	June 1, 2002	Socorro	LINEAR	·	2.1 km	MPC · JPL
385343	2002 LV	—	June 1, 2002	Socorro	LINEAR	APO +1km · PHA	1.4 km	MPC · JPL
385344	2002 NT_{66}	—	July 9, 2002	Palomar	NEAT	·	2.0 km	MPC · JPL
385345	2002 NW_{72}	—	July 8, 2002	Palomar	NEAT	(1547)	1.4 km	MPC · JPL
385346	2002 OT_{8}	—	July 19, 2002	Palomar	NEAT	·	630 m	MPC · JPL
385347	2002 OA_{29}	—	July 29, 2002	Palomar	NEAT	·	2.1 km	MPC · JPL
385348	2002 OG_{33}	—	July 18, 2002	Palomar	NEAT	·	1.7 km	MPC · JPL
385349	2002 OK_{34}	—	July 22, 2002	Palomar	NEAT	·	620 m	MPC · JPL
385350	2002 PT_{9}	—	August 5, 2002	Palomar	NEAT	·	800 m	MPC · JPL
385351	2002 PM_{29}	—	August 6, 2002	Palomar	NEAT	·	1.6 km	MPC · JPL
385352	2002 PF_{36}	—	August 6, 2002	Palomar	NEAT	·	1.8 km	MPC · JPL
385353	2002 PZ_{46}	—	August 10, 2002	Socorro	LINEAR	H	700 m	MPC · JPL
385354	2002 PM_{80}	—	August 10, 2002	Socorro	LINEAR	fast	1.4 km	MPC · JPL
385355	2002 PQ_{87}	—	August 14, 2002	Socorro	LINEAR	·	1.1 km	MPC · JPL
385356	2002 PC_{96}	—	August 14, 2002	Socorro	LINEAR	·	2.7 km	MPC · JPL
385357	2002 PJ_{129}	—	August 15, 2002	Anderson Mesa	LONEOS	·	2.7 km	MPC · JPL
385358	2002 PO_{138}	—	August 8, 2002	Palomar	NEAT	H	500 m	MPC · JPL
385359	2002 PZ_{141}	—	August 14, 2002	Socorro	LINEAR	H	650 m	MPC · JPL
385360	2002 PW_{154}	—	August 12, 2002	Cerro Tololo	M. W. Buie	·	740 m	MPC · JPL
385361	2002 PB_{169}	—	August 8, 2002	Palomar	NEAT	·	650 m	MPC · JPL
385362	2002 PT_{170}	—	August 5, 2002	Mauna Kea	Mauna Kea	cubewano (cold)	176 km	MPC · JPL
385363	2002 PW_{170}	—	August 5, 2002	Mauna Kea	Mauna Kea	cubewano (cold)	192 km	MPC · JPL
385364	2002 PX_{173}	—	August 8, 2002	Palomar	NEAT	·	680 m	MPC · JPL
385365	2002 PU_{174}	—	August 15, 2002	Palomar	NEAT	JUN	1.4 km	MPC · JPL
385366	2002 PH_{175}	—	August 11, 2002	Palomar	NEAT	·	2.4 km	MPC · JPL
385367	2002 PE_{176}	—	August 7, 2002	Palomar	NEAT	·	830 m	MPC · JPL
385368	2002 PF_{179}	—	August 12, 2002	Socorro	LINEAR	·	1.9 km	MPC · JPL
385369	2002 PK_{179}	—	August 8, 2002	Palomar	NEAT	BAP	720 m	MPC · JPL
385370	2002 QM_{13}	—	August 26, 2002	Palomar	NEAT	EUN	1.3 km	MPC · JPL
385371	2002 QS_{16}	—	August 27, 2002	Palomar	NEAT	·	710 m	MPC · JPL
385372	2002 QJ_{19}	—	August 26, 2002	Palomar	NEAT	V	780 m	MPC · JPL
385373	2002 QK_{72}	—	August 17, 2002	Palomar	NEAT	·	640 m	MPC · JPL
385374	2002 QM_{119}	—	August 30, 2002	Palomar	NEAT	·	3.2 km	MPC · JPL
385375	2002 QT_{124}	—	August 17, 2002	Palomar	NEAT	·	2.4 km	MPC · JPL
385376	2002 RE_{8}	—	September 3, 2002	Haleakala	NEAT	·	1.0 km	MPC · JPL
385377	2002 RJ_{8}	—	September 3, 2002	Haleakala	NEAT	·	1.1 km	MPC · JPL
385378	2002 RV_{34}	—	September 4, 2002	Anderson Mesa	LONEOS	BRA	1.8 km	MPC · JPL
385379	2002 RN_{58}	—	September 5, 2002	Anderson Mesa	LONEOS	(2076)	900 m	MPC · JPL
385380	2002 RN_{112}	—	September 5, 2002	Socorro	LINEAR	H	650 m	MPC · JPL
385381	2002 RT_{125}	—	September 5, 2002	Socorro	LINEAR	PHO	1.2 km	MPC · JPL
385382	2002 RQ_{236}	—	September 15, 2002	Palomar	R. Matson	EUN	1.6 km	MPC · JPL
385383	2002 RK_{283}	—	September 8, 2002	Haleakala	NEAT	·	2.3 km	MPC · JPL
385384	2002 SW_{2}	—	September 27, 2002	Palomar	NEAT	H	570 m	MPC · JPL
385385	2002 ST_{72}	—	September 16, 2002	Palomar	NEAT	H	550 m	MPC · JPL
385386	2002 TH_{11}	—	October 1, 2002	Anderson Mesa	LONEOS	·	1.7 km	MPC · JPL
385387	2002 TJ_{66}	—	October 3, 2002	Socorro	LINEAR	H	860 m	MPC · JPL
385388	2002 TR_{194}	—	October 3, 2002	Socorro	LINEAR	·	870 m	MPC · JPL
385389	2002 TT_{263}	—	October 10, 2002	Socorro	LINEAR	·	2.2 km	MPC · JPL
385390	2002 TU_{319}	—	October 5, 2002	Apache Point	SDSS	·	1.5 km	MPC · JPL
385391	2002 TL_{378}	—	October 15, 2002	Palomar	NEAT	·	2.8 km	MPC · JPL
385392	2002 UF_{55}	—	October 29, 2002	Apache Point	SDSS	·	700 m	MPC · JPL
385393	2002 VZ_{2}	—	November 1, 2002	La Palma	La Palma	·	1.6 km	MPC · JPL
385394	2002 VZ_{8}	—	November 1, 2002	Palomar	NEAT	(2076)	1.3 km	MPC · JPL
385395	2002 VO_{14}	—	November 6, 2002	Socorro	LINEAR	·	1.5 km	MPC · JPL
385396	2002 VR_{24}	—	November 5, 2002	Socorro	LINEAR	·	850 m	MPC · JPL
385397	2002 VQ_{26}	—	November 5, 2002	Socorro	LINEAR	·	2.0 km	MPC · JPL
385398	2002 VR_{30}	—	November 5, 2002	Socorro	LINEAR	·	1.0 km	MPC · JPL
385399	2002 VK_{66}	—	November 6, 2002	Socorro	LINEAR	·	820 m	MPC · JPL
385400	2002 VF_{124}	—	November 14, 2002	Socorro	LINEAR	·	930 m	MPC · JPL

== 385401–385500 ==
back to top

Designation			Discovery			Properties		Ref
Permanent	Provisional	Named after	Date	Site	Discoverer(s)	Category	Diam.	Ref
385401	2002 VF_{127}	—	November 14, 2002	Socorro	LINEAR	V	860 m	MPC · JPL
385402	2002 WZ_{2}	—	November 23, 2002	Palomar	NEAT	T_{j} (2.52) · APO +1km	1.6 km	MPC · JPL
385403	2002 WE_{10}	—	November 24, 2002	Palomar	NEAT	NYS	830 m	MPC · JPL
385404	2002 WM_{30}	—	November 24, 2002	Palomar	NEAT	·	780 m	MPC · JPL
385405	2002 XA_{7}	—	December 2, 2002	Socorro	LINEAR	·	1.7 km	MPC · JPL
385406	2002 XP_{34}	—	December 6, 2002	Socorro	LINEAR	·	1.3 km	MPC · JPL
385407	2002 XY_{54}	—	December 10, 2002	Palomar	NEAT	·	1.7 km	MPC · JPL
385408	2002 XW_{64}	—	December 11, 2002	Socorro	LINEAR	PHO	1.3 km	MPC · JPL
385409	2002 XO_{66}	—	December 10, 2002	Socorro	LINEAR	·	1.0 km	MPC · JPL
385410	2002 XF_{119}	—	December 10, 2002	Palomar	NEAT	EOS	2.0 km	MPC · JPL
385411	2002 YH_{19}	—	December 31, 2002	Socorro	LINEAR	·	1.2 km	MPC · JPL
385412	2003 AQ_{16}	—	January 5, 2003	Socorro	LINEAR	·	4.2 km	MPC · JPL
385413	2003 AS_{71}	—	January 10, 2003	Socorro	LINEAR	H	640 m	MPC · JPL
385414	2003 AE_{73}	—	January 11, 2003	Socorro	LINEAR	·	2.8 km	MPC · JPL
385415	2003 AL_{79}	—	January 11, 2003	Kitt Peak	Spacewatch	·	1.1 km	MPC · JPL
385416	2003 AF_{85}	—	January 8, 2003	Socorro	LINEAR	AEG	3.3 km	MPC · JPL
385417	2003 BB_{47}	—	January 29, 2003	Palomar	NEAT	EUP	4.2 km	MPC · JPL
385418	2003 BV_{63}	—	January 28, 2003	Palomar	NEAT	TIR	3.1 km	MPC · JPL
385419	2003 BK_{66}	—	January 30, 2003	Anderson Mesa	LONEOS	H	680 m	MPC · JPL
385420	2003 CT_{21}	—	February 2, 2003	Socorro	LINEAR	·	5.2 km	MPC · JPL
385421	2003 CL_{26}	—	February 11, 2003	Haleakala	NEAT	·	3.3 km	MPC · JPL
385422	2003 DF_{4}	—	February 21, 2003	Palomar	NEAT	T_{j} (2.98)	3.7 km	MPC · JPL
385423	2003 DE_{6}	—	February 23, 2003	Palomar	NEAT	AMO	510 m	MPC · JPL
385424	2003 DU_{6}	—	February 23, 2003	Črni Vrh	Mikuž, H.	LIX	4.0 km	MPC · JPL
385425	2003 DA_{10}	—	February 23, 2003	Socorro	LINEAR	T_{j} (2.88)	5.6 km	MPC · JPL
385426	2003 EV_{6}	—	January 31, 2003	Socorro	LINEAR	·	4.5 km	MPC · JPL
385427	2003 ER_{46}	—	March 8, 2003	Socorro	LINEAR	TIR	3.4 km	MPC · JPL
385428	2003 EU_{47}	—	March 9, 2003	Anderson Mesa	LONEOS	MAS	810 m	MPC · JPL
385429	2003 EP_{58}	—	March 10, 2003	Anderson Mesa	LONEOS	·	1.5 km	MPC · JPL
385430	2003 EP_{62}	—	March 11, 2003	Kitt Peak	Spacewatch	NYS	1.0 km	MPC · JPL
385431	2003 FA_{4}	—	March 25, 2003	Haleakala	NEAT	·	3.0 km	MPC · JPL
385432	2003 FF_{13}	—	March 7, 2003	Anderson Mesa	LONEOS	·	3.8 km	MPC · JPL
385433	2003 FR_{56}	—	March 26, 2003	Palomar	NEAT	·	1.6 km	MPC · JPL
385434	2003 FZ_{62}	—	March 26, 2003	Palomar	NEAT	·	1.7 km	MPC · JPL
385435	2003 FA_{131}	—	March 22, 2003	Palomar	NEAT	·	1.4 km	MPC · JPL
385436	2003 FQ_{133}	—	March 27, 2003	Kitt Peak	Spacewatch	NYS	1.1 km	MPC · JPL
385437	2003 GH_{55}	—	April 1, 2003	Cerro Tololo	Deep Lens Survey	cubewano (cold)	178 km	MPC · JPL
385438	2003 HQ_{3}	—	April 24, 2003	Anderson Mesa	LONEOS	NYS	1.2 km	MPC · JPL
385439	2003 HS_{25}	—	April 25, 2003	Kitt Peak	Spacewatch	THM	2.3 km	MPC · JPL
385440	2003 MC_{6}	—	June 26, 2003	Socorro	LINEAR	·	1.6 km	MPC · JPL
385441	2003 OG_{5}	—	July 22, 2003	Haleakala	NEAT	·	2.1 km	MPC · JPL
385442	2003 OM_{6}	—	July 22, 2003	Campo Imperatore	CINEOS	·	2.0 km	MPC · JPL
385443	2003 QX_{7}	—	August 21, 2003	Palomar	NEAT	·	2.6 km	MPC · JPL
385444	2003 QU_{26}	—	August 22, 2003	Haleakala	NEAT	·	2.5 km	MPC · JPL
385445	2003 QH_{91}	—	August 24, 2003	Cerro Tololo	M. W. Buie	plutino	208 km	MPC · JPL
385446 Manwë	2003 QW_{111}	Manwë	August 25, 2003	Cerro Tololo	M. W. Buie	res · 4:7 · moon	160 km	MPC · JPL
385447	2003 QF_{113}	—	August 25, 2003	Cerro Tololo	M. W. Buie	cubewano (cold)	169 km	MPC · JPL
385448	2003 QC_{115}	—	August 23, 2003	Socorro	LINEAR	·	2.1 km	MPC · JPL
385449	2003 SO_{23}	—	September 17, 2003	Kitt Peak	Spacewatch	·	2.1 km	MPC · JPL
385450	2003 SN_{26}	—	September 17, 2003	Haleakala	NEAT	·	2.2 km	MPC · JPL
385451	2003 SD_{53}	—	September 19, 2003	Palomar	NEAT	·	2.3 km	MPC · JPL
385452	2003 SD_{64}	—	September 17, 2003	Campo Imperatore	CINEOS	·	1.7 km	MPC · JPL
385453	2003 SS_{91}	—	September 18, 2003	Socorro	LINEAR	·	2.7 km	MPC · JPL
385454	2003 SP_{168}	—	September 23, 2003	Haleakala	NEAT	·	2.6 km	MPC · JPL
385455	2003 SW_{236}	—	September 19, 2003	Campo Imperatore	CINEOS	·	2.2 km	MPC · JPL
385456	2003 SC_{279}	—	September 30, 2003	Kitt Peak	Spacewatch	·	2.1 km	MPC · JPL
385457	2003 ST_{285}	—	September 20, 2003	Kitt Peak	Spacewatch	·	2.0 km	MPC · JPL
385458	2003 SP_{317}	—	September 25, 2003	Mauna Kea	Mauna Kea	cubewano (hot)	170 km	MPC · JPL
385459	2003 SG_{332}	—	September 28, 2003	Socorro	LINEAR	·	680 m	MPC · JPL
385460	2003 SR_{348}	—	September 18, 2003	Kitt Peak	Spacewatch	·	1.6 km	MPC · JPL
385461	2003 SY_{379}	—	September 26, 2003	Apache Point	SDSS	·	1.8 km	MPC · JPL
385462	2003 TY_{3}	—	October 2, 2003	Kitt Peak	Spacewatch	·	1.5 km	MPC · JPL
385463	2003 TG_{8}	—	October 2, 2003	Kitt Peak	Spacewatch	·	2.8 km	MPC · JPL
385464	2003 TQ_{16}	—	October 14, 2003	Anderson Mesa	LONEOS	·	2.2 km	MPC · JPL
385465	2003 UF_{35}	—	October 1, 2003	Kitt Peak	Spacewatch	GEF	1.3 km	MPC · JPL
385466	2003 UO_{40}	—	September 22, 2003	Kitt Peak	Spacewatch	NEM	2.4 km	MPC · JPL
385467	2003 UD_{74}	—	October 16, 2003	Palomar	NEAT	·	2.2 km	MPC · JPL
385468	2003 UF_{108}	—	October 19, 2003	Kitt Peak	Spacewatch	·	2.4 km	MPC · JPL
385469	2003 UE_{130}	—	October 18, 2003	Palomar	NEAT	BRA	2.0 km	MPC · JPL
385470	2003 UT_{140}	—	September 28, 2003	Anderson Mesa	LONEOS	·	1.8 km	MPC · JPL
385471	2003 UD_{188}	—	October 22, 2003	Socorro	LINEAR	·	2.6 km	MPC · JPL
385472	2003 UP_{193}	—	October 20, 2003	Socorro	LINEAR	·	2.2 km	MPC · JPL
385473	2003 UJ_{230}	—	October 23, 2003	Kitt Peak	Spacewatch	·	2.0 km	MPC · JPL
385474	2003 UC_{281}	—	October 28, 2003	Socorro	LINEAR	·	2.0 km	MPC · JPL
385475	2003 UL_{288}	—	October 23, 2003	Kitt Peak	M. W. Buie	·	2.9 km	MPC · JPL
385476	2003 UC_{331}	—	October 18, 2003	Apache Point	SDSS	EUN	1.5 km	MPC · JPL
385477	2003 VH_{3}	—	November 15, 2003	Kitt Peak	Spacewatch	·	600 m	MPC · JPL
385478	2003 WS_{8}	—	November 16, 2003	Kitt Peak	Spacewatch	·	2.4 km	MPC · JPL
385479	2003 WE_{10}	—	November 18, 2003	Kitt Peak	Spacewatch	·	2.3 km	MPC · JPL
385480	2003 WE_{16}	—	October 23, 2003	Kitt Peak	Spacewatch	·	1.8 km	MPC · JPL
385481	2003 WL_{45}	—	November 19, 2003	Palomar	NEAT	·	640 m	MPC · JPL
385482	2003 WK_{81}	—	November 20, 2003	Kitt Peak	Spacewatch	·	2.3 km	MPC · JPL
385483	2003 WF_{84}	—	November 21, 2003	Kitt Peak	Spacewatch	·	650 m	MPC · JPL
385484	2003 WB_{122}	—	November 20, 2003	Socorro	LINEAR	·	2.8 km	MPC · JPL
385485	2003 WJ_{122}	—	October 23, 2003	Kitt Peak	Spacewatch	GEF	1.4 km	MPC · JPL
385486	2003 WP_{178}	—	November 20, 2003	Kitt Peak	M. W. Buie	·	530 m	MPC · JPL
385487	2003 YJ_{44}	—	December 19, 2003	Kitt Peak	Spacewatch	·	670 m	MPC · JPL
385488	2003 YK_{104}	—	December 21, 2003	Kitt Peak	Spacewatch	·	2.9 km	MPC · JPL
385489	2004 BE_{34}	—	January 19, 2004	Kitt Peak	Spacewatch	·	560 m	MPC · JPL
385490	2004 BY_{97}	—	January 27, 2004	Kitt Peak	Spacewatch	·	3.1 km	MPC · JPL
385491	2004 BD_{102}	—	January 29, 2004	Kitt Peak	Spacewatch	·	2.3 km	MPC · JPL
385492	2004 CU_{39}	—	February 13, 2004	Kitt Peak	Spacewatch	H	430 m	MPC · JPL
385493	2004 CN_{49}	—	January 14, 2002	Kitt Peak	Spacewatch	L4	9.2 km	MPC · JPL
385494	2004 CO_{51}	—	February 11, 2004	Palomar	NEAT	H	510 m	MPC · JPL
385495	2004 CX_{95}	—	February 13, 2004	Kitt Peak	Spacewatch	·	4.3 km	MPC · JPL
385496	2004 CF_{99}	—	February 15, 2004	Socorro	LINEAR	·	990 m	MPC · JPL
385497	2004 DD	—	February 17, 2004	Kitt Peak	Spacewatch	APO	590 m	MPC · JPL
385498	2004 DP_{27}	—	February 16, 2004	Catalina	CSS	·	4.0 km	MPC · JPL
385499	2004 DJ_{63}	—	February 29, 2004	Kitt Peak	Spacewatch	·	870 m	MPC · JPL
385500	2004 DA_{73}	—	February 17, 2004	Kitt Peak	Spacewatch	TEL	1.6 km	MPC · JPL

== 385501–385600 ==
back to top

Designation			Discovery			Properties		Ref
Permanent	Provisional	Named after	Date	Site	Discoverer(s)	Category	Diam.	Ref
385501	2004 EZ_{24}	—	March 15, 2004	Socorro	LINEAR	H	640 m	MPC · JPL
385502	2004 EG_{46}	—	February 25, 2004	Socorro	LINEAR	·	810 m	MPC · JPL
385503	2004 EL_{47}	—	March 15, 2004	Catalina	CSS	·	830 m	MPC · JPL
385504	2004 ED_{48}	—	March 15, 2004	Catalina	CSS	·	2.6 km	MPC · JPL
385505	2004 EX_{48}	—	March 15, 2004	Catalina	CSS	·	800 m	MPC · JPL
385506	2004 EO_{112}	—	March 15, 2004	Socorro	LINEAR	·	2.8 km	MPC · JPL
385507	2004 FZ_{31}	—	March 17, 2004	Socorro	LINEAR	H	550 m	MPC · JPL
385508	2004 FT_{53}	—	March 17, 2004	Kitt Peak	Spacewatch	·	2.3 km	MPC · JPL
385509	2004 FC_{81}	—	March 16, 2004	Socorro	LINEAR	·	1 km	MPC · JPL
385510	2004 FB_{105}	—	March 23, 2004	Kitt Peak	Spacewatch	EOS	1.7 km	MPC · JPL
385511	2004 FU_{124}	—	March 27, 2004	Socorro	LINEAR	·	2.1 km	MPC · JPL
385512	2004 FP_{153}	—	March 17, 2004	Kitt Peak	Spacewatch	·	2.8 km	MPC · JPL
385513	2004 GE_{54}	—	April 13, 2004	Kitt Peak	Spacewatch	EOS	1.8 km	MPC · JPL
385514	2004 GY_{59}	—	April 13, 2004	Kitt Peak	Spacewatch	·	2.3 km	MPC · JPL
385515	2004 GV_{88}	—	April 14, 2004	Kitt Peak	Spacewatch	EOS	2.2 km	MPC · JPL
385516	2004 HC_{3}	—	March 31, 2004	Kitt Peak	Spacewatch	·	810 m	MPC · JPL
385517	2004 HP_{20}	—	April 19, 2004	Socorro	LINEAR	·	3.7 km	MPC · JPL
385518	2004 HP_{54}	—	April 21, 2004	Catalina	CSS	·	4.4 km	MPC · JPL
385519	2004 HO_{78}	—	April 21, 2004	Kitt Peak	Spacewatch	·	4.3 km	MPC · JPL
385520	2004 JK_{8}	—	May 12, 2004	Catalina	CSS	·	3.6 km	MPC · JPL
385521	2004 JR_{10}	—	May 27, 1997	Kitt Peak	Spacewatch	·	1.1 km	MPC · JPL
385522	2004 LH_{3}	—	June 6, 2004	Palomar	NEAT	·	4.5 km	MPC · JPL
385523	2004 LL_{14}	—	June 11, 2004	Socorro	LINEAR	EUP	4.2 km	MPC · JPL
385524	2004 MR_{8}	—	June 29, 2004	Siding Spring	SSS	·	1.7 km	MPC · JPL
385525	2004 NZ_{1}	—	July 9, 2004	Palomar	NEAT	·	1.5 km	MPC · JPL
385526	2004 OC	—	July 16, 2004	Socorro	LINEAR	·	1.3 km	MPC · JPL
385527	2004 OK_{14}	—	July 17, 2004	Cerro Tololo	M. W. Buie	res · 4:7	119 km	MPC · JPL
385528	2004 OR_{15}	—	July 22, 2004	Mauna Kea	Canada-France Ecliptic Plane Survey	SDO	112 km	MPC · JPL
385529	2004 PT_{7}	—	August 6, 2004	Palomar	NEAT	PHO	1.1 km	MPC · JPL
385530	2004 PQ_{26}	—	August 8, 2004	Socorro	LINEAR	H	590 m	MPC · JPL
385531	2004 PX_{36}	—	August 9, 2004	Socorro	LINEAR	EUN	1.2 km	MPC · JPL
385532	2004 PM_{64}	—	August 10, 2004	Socorro	LINEAR	H	790 m	MPC · JPL
385533	2004 QD_{29}	—	July 30, 2005	Mauna Kea	Gladman, B. J.	cubewano (hot)	194 km	MPC · JPL
385534	2004 RD_{5}	—	September 4, 2004	Palomar	NEAT	·	1.3 km	MPC · JPL
385535	2004 RL_{24}	—	September 8, 2004	Socorro	LINEAR	H	640 m	MPC · JPL
385536	2004 RP_{36}	—	September 7, 2004	Socorro	LINEAR	(5)	1.3 km	MPC · JPL
385537	2004 RM_{42}	—	September 8, 2004	Campo Imperatore	CINEOS	·	1.2 km	MPC · JPL
385538	2004 RJ_{63}	—	September 8, 2004	Socorro	LINEAR	·	1.2 km	MPC · JPL
385539	2004 RP_{73}	—	September 8, 2004	Socorro	LINEAR	·	1.6 km	MPC · JPL
385540	2004 RT_{145}	—	September 9, 2004	Socorro	LINEAR	H	680 m	MPC · JPL
385541	2004 RF_{153}	—	September 10, 2004	Socorro	LINEAR	·	1.1 km	MPC · JPL
385542	2004 RN_{179}	—	September 10, 2004	Socorro	LINEAR	·	1.1 km	MPC · JPL
385543	2004 RU_{198}	—	September 10, 2004	Socorro	LINEAR	·	1.7 km	MPC · JPL
385544	2004 RH_{230}	—	September 9, 2004	Kitt Peak	Spacewatch	·	1.4 km	MPC · JPL
385545	2004 RS_{237}	—	September 10, 2004	Kitt Peak	Spacewatch	·	1.2 km	MPC · JPL
385546	2004 RP_{262}	—	September 10, 2004	Kitt Peak	Spacewatch	·	1.2 km	MPC · JPL
385547	2004 RQ_{307}	—	September 13, 2004	Socorro	LINEAR	(5)	1.4 km	MPC · JPL
385548	2004 RB_{341}	—	September 7, 2004	Socorro	LINEAR	(194)	1.8 km	MPC · JPL
385549	2004 SZ_{3}	—	September 17, 2004	Socorro	LINEAR	·	2.4 km	MPC · JPL
385550	2004 SW_{52}	—	September 22, 2004	Socorro	LINEAR	EUN	3.1 km	MPC · JPL
385551	2004 TU_{6}	—	October 3, 2004	Palomar	NEAT	·	1.6 km	MPC · JPL
385552	2004 TO_{30}	—	October 4, 2004	Kitt Peak	Spacewatch	·	1.2 km	MPC · JPL
385553	2004 TS_{32}	—	October 4, 2004	Kitt Peak	Spacewatch	T_{j} (2.95) · 3:2	4.7 km	MPC · JPL
385554	2004 TP_{64}	—	October 5, 2004	Kitt Peak	Spacewatch	·	1.7 km	MPC · JPL
385555	2004 TO_{71}	—	October 6, 2004	Kitt Peak	Spacewatch	KON	2.2 km	MPC · JPL
385556	2004 TU_{73}	—	October 6, 2004	Kitt Peak	Spacewatch	·	1.5 km	MPC · JPL
385557	2004 TF_{74}	—	October 6, 2004	Kitt Peak	Spacewatch	(5)	1.1 km	MPC · JPL
385558	2004 TU_{80}	—	October 5, 2004	Kitt Peak	Spacewatch	·	1.0 km	MPC · JPL
385559	2004 TY_{92}	—	October 5, 2004	Kitt Peak	Spacewatch	·	920 m	MPC · JPL
385560	2004 TA_{134}	—	October 7, 2004	Palomar	NEAT	EUN	1.5 km	MPC · JPL
385561	2004 TO_{140}	—	October 4, 2004	Kitt Peak	Spacewatch	·	1.7 km	MPC · JPL
385562	2004 TA_{156}	—	October 6, 2004	Kitt Peak	Spacewatch	·	1.3 km	MPC · JPL
385563	2004 TR_{160}	—	October 6, 2004	Kitt Peak	Spacewatch	·	1.0 km	MPC · JPL
385564	2004 TG_{195}	—	October 7, 2004	Kitt Peak	Spacewatch	(5)	1.0 km	MPC · JPL
385565	2004 TD_{196}	—	October 7, 2004	Kitt Peak	Spacewatch	·	1.1 km	MPC · JPL
385566	2004 TB_{244}	—	October 6, 2004	Saint-Sulpice	Saint-Sulpice	·	1.1 km	MPC · JPL
385567	2004 TZ_{274}	—	October 9, 2004	Kitt Peak	Spacewatch	HIL · 3:2	5.7 km	MPC · JPL
385568	2004 TW_{289}	—	October 10, 2004	Socorro	LINEAR	EUN	1.2 km	MPC · JPL
385569	2004 TO_{332}	—	October 9, 2004	Kitt Peak	Spacewatch	·	1.2 km	MPC · JPL
385570	2004 TH_{367}	—	October 8, 2004	Socorro	LINEAR	·	1.7 km	MPC · JPL
385571 Otrera	2004 UP_{10}	Otrera	October 16, 2004	Las Campanas	S. S. Sheppard, C. A. Trujillo	NT	90 km	MPC · JPL
385572	2004 VS_{1}	—	November 4, 2004	Needville	J. Dellinger, Garossino, P.	EUN	1.5 km	MPC · JPL
385573	2004 VX_{7}	—	November 3, 2004	Kitt Peak	Spacewatch	·	1.7 km	MPC · JPL
385574	2004 VA_{18}	—	November 4, 2004	Kitt Peak	Spacewatch	·	1.1 km	MPC · JPL
385575	2004 VY_{27}	—	November 5, 2004	Palomar	NEAT	ADE	1.9 km	MPC · JPL
385576	2004 VZ_{35}	—	November 4, 2004	Kitt Peak	Spacewatch	·	1.1 km	MPC · JPL
385577	2004 VU_{50}	—	November 4, 2004	Kitt Peak	Spacewatch	·	1.4 km	MPC · JPL
385578	2004 VL_{76}	—	October 9, 2004	Kitt Peak	Spacewatch	EUN	1.4 km	MPC · JPL
385579	2004 WV_{9}	—	November 17, 2004	CBA-East	CBA-East	·	1.7 km	MPC · JPL
385580	2004 XO_{14}	—	December 10, 2004	Catalina	CSS	AMO +1km	2.0 km	MPC · JPL
385581	2004 XZ_{17}	—	December 7, 2004	Socorro	LINEAR	EUN	1.3 km	MPC · JPL
385582	2004 XA_{30}	—	December 10, 2004	Socorro	LINEAR	·	2.3 km	MPC · JPL
385583	2004 XC_{30}	—	December 10, 2004	Anderson Mesa	LONEOS	·	2.3 km	MPC · JPL
385584	2004 XZ_{48}	—	December 11, 2004	Kitt Peak	Spacewatch	·	1.9 km	MPC · JPL
385585	2004 XY_{72}	—	December 9, 2004	Catalina	CSS	·	1.6 km	MPC · JPL
385586	2004 XB_{78}	—	December 10, 2004	Socorro	LINEAR	·	1.3 km	MPC · JPL
385587	2004 XA_{101}	—	December 14, 2004	Socorro	LINEAR	·	1.2 km	MPC · JPL
385588	2004 XK_{102}	—	December 11, 2004	Socorro	LINEAR	JUN	1.2 km	MPC · JPL
385589	2004 XM_{110}	—	December 14, 2004	Socorro	LINEAR	·	2.4 km	MPC · JPL
385590	2004 XV_{115}	—	December 12, 2004	Kitt Peak	Spacewatch	·	2.0 km	MPC · JPL
385591	2004 XB_{136}	—	December 15, 2004	Socorro	LINEAR	·	1.7 km	MPC · JPL
385592	2005 AX_{14}	—	January 6, 2005	Catalina	CSS	·	2.3 km	MPC · JPL
385593	2005 AN_{30}	—	January 9, 2005	Catalina	CSS	·	2.5 km	MPC · JPL
385594	2005 AF_{78}	—	January 15, 2005	Kitt Peak	Spacewatch	·	1.9 km	MPC · JPL
385595	2005 BR_{26}	—	January 19, 2005	Socorro	LINEAR	·	1.7 km	MPC · JPL
385596	2005 CO_{15}	—	February 2, 2005	Socorro	LINEAR	·	1.7 km	MPC · JPL
385597	2005 CU_{47}	—	February 2, 2005	Kitt Peak	Spacewatch	·	2.3 km	MPC · JPL
385598	2005 EX_{9}	—	March 2, 2005	Kitt Peak	Spacewatch	·	1.9 km	MPC · JPL
385599	2005 EN_{84}	—	March 4, 2005	Socorro	LINEAR	TIR	3.0 km	MPC · JPL
385600	2005 EH_{112}	—	March 4, 2005	Socorro	LINEAR	·	1.9 km	MPC · JPL

== 385601–385700 ==
back to top

Designation			Discovery			Properties		Ref
Permanent	Provisional	Named after	Date	Site	Discoverer(s)	Category	Diam.	Ref
385601	2005 ES_{116}	—	March 4, 2005	Mount Lemmon	Mount Lemmon Survey	KOR	1.2 km	MPC · JPL
385602	2005 EK_{130}	—	March 9, 2005	Mount Lemmon	Mount Lemmon Survey	·	1.6 km	MPC · JPL
385603	2005 ED_{184}	—	March 9, 2005	Mount Lemmon	Mount Lemmon Survey	·	2.3 km	MPC · JPL
385604	2005 EV_{205}	—	March 13, 2005	Mount Lemmon	Mount Lemmon Survey	GAL	1.6 km	MPC · JPL
385605	2005 EJ_{225}	—	March 14, 2005	Mount Lemmon	Mount Lemmon Survey	APO · PHA	570 m	MPC · JPL
385606	2005 EV_{250}	—	March 9, 2005	Socorro	LINEAR	·	3.1 km	MPC · JPL
385607	2005 EO_{297}	—	March 11, 2005	Kitt Peak	M. W. Buie	res · 1:3	135 km	MPC · JPL
385608	2005 GM_{10}	—	March 11, 2005	Kitt Peak	Spacewatch	·	2.4 km	MPC · JPL
385609	2005 GS_{34}	—	April 1, 2005	Anderson Mesa	LONEOS	·	3.1 km	MPC · JPL
385610	2005 GV_{56}	—	April 6, 2005	Kitt Peak	Spacewatch	·	690 m	MPC · JPL
385611	2005 GC_{65}	—	April 2, 2005	Catalina	CSS	·	2.2 km	MPC · JPL
385612	2005 GQ_{79}	—	April 6, 2005	Mount Lemmon	Mount Lemmon Survey	AGN	1.5 km	MPC · JPL
385613	2005 GP_{91}	—	April 6, 2005	Kitt Peak	Spacewatch	·	3.0 km	MPC · JPL
385614	2005 GA_{142}	—	April 10, 2005	Kitt Peak	Spacewatch	MRX	1.2 km	MPC · JPL
385615	2005 GF_{210}	—	April 9, 2005	Catalina	CSS	·	3.2 km	MPC · JPL
385616	2005 JP_{128}	—	May 13, 2005	Kitt Peak	Spacewatch	·	830 m	MPC · JPL
385617	2005 ML_{21}	—	June 30, 2005	Kitt Peak	Spacewatch	·	770 m	MPC · JPL
385618	2005 MW_{21}	—	June 30, 2005	Kitt Peak	Spacewatch	·	4.5 km	MPC · JPL
385619	2005 MB_{22}	—	June 30, 2005	Kitt Peak	Spacewatch	·	700 m	MPC · JPL
385620	2005 MA_{26}	—	June 1, 2005	Mount Lemmon	Mount Lemmon Survey	·	3.2 km	MPC · JPL
385621	2005 MS_{31}	—	June 28, 2005	Kitt Peak	Spacewatch	·	1.3 km	MPC · JPL
385622	2005 NR_{4}	—	July 3, 2005	Mount Lemmon	Mount Lemmon Survey	MAS	780 m	MPC · JPL
385623	2005 NT_{5}	—	July 3, 2005	Mount Lemmon	Mount Lemmon Survey	·	3.4 km	MPC · JPL
385624	2005 ND_{22}	—	July 1, 2005	Kitt Peak	Spacewatch	·	3.0 km	MPC · JPL
385625	2005 NS_{30}	—	July 4, 2005	Kitt Peak	Spacewatch	·	1.0 km	MPC · JPL
385626	2005 NO_{31}	—	July 4, 2005	Palomar	NEAT	URS	3.6 km	MPC · JPL
385627	2005 NZ_{43}	—	July 6, 2005	Kitt Peak	Spacewatch	·	3.0 km	MPC · JPL
385628	2005 NG_{84}	—	July 2, 2005	Kitt Peak	Spacewatch	·	1.8 km	MPC · JPL
385629	2005 OU_{18}	—	July 30, 2005	Palomar	NEAT	·	2.9 km	MPC · JPL
385630	2005 OP_{21}	—	July 28, 2005	Palomar	NEAT	·	1.4 km	MPC · JPL
385631	2005 QK_{52}	—	August 27, 2005	Kitt Peak	Spacewatch	NYS	800 m	MPC · JPL
385632	2005 QQ_{52}	—	August 27, 2005	Haleakala	NEAT	·	1.4 km	MPC · JPL
385633	2005 QD_{57}	—	August 29, 2005	Vicques	M. Ory	·	4.2 km	MPC · JPL
385634	2005 QW_{65}	—	July 12, 2005	Anderson Mesa	LONEOS	·	4.7 km	MPC · JPL
385635	2005 QX_{73}	—	August 29, 2005	Anderson Mesa	LONEOS	·	1.6 km	MPC · JPL
385636	2005 QS_{75}	—	August 30, 2005	Kitt Peak	Spacewatch	·	1.6 km	MPC · JPL
385637	2005 QQ_{88}	—	August 29, 2005	St. Véran	St. Veran	MAS	790 m	MPC · JPL
385638	2005 QY_{110}	—	August 27, 2005	Palomar	NEAT	·	1.2 km	MPC · JPL
385639	2005 QB_{116}	—	August 28, 2005	Kitt Peak	Spacewatch	VER	2.9 km	MPC · JPL
385640	2005 QW_{116}	—	August 28, 2005	Kitt Peak	Spacewatch	NYS	1.1 km	MPC · JPL
385641	2005 QT_{120}	—	August 28, 2005	Kitt Peak	Spacewatch	·	840 m	MPC · JPL
385642	2005 QX_{131}	—	August 28, 2005	Kitt Peak	Spacewatch	·	1.1 km	MPC · JPL
385643	2005 QR_{133}	—	August 28, 2005	Kitt Peak	Spacewatch	·	830 m	MPC · JPL
385644	2005 QH_{138}	—	August 28, 2005	Kitt Peak	Spacewatch	MAS	640 m	MPC · JPL
385645	2005 QS_{174}	—	August 31, 2005	Kitt Peak	Spacewatch	·	1.1 km	MPC · JPL
385646	2005 QN_{175}	—	August 31, 2005	Kitt Peak	Spacewatch	·	1.1 km	MPC · JPL
385647	2005 QR_{178}	—	August 29, 2005	Kitt Peak	Spacewatch	·	3.7 km	MPC · JPL
385648	2005 QU_{181}	—	August 31, 2005	Anderson Mesa	LONEOS	V	700 m	MPC · JPL
385649	2005 QG_{190}	—	August 31, 2005	Kitt Peak	Spacewatch	V	600 m	MPC · JPL
385650	2005 RW_{11}	—	September 11, 2005	Junk Bond	D. Healy	·	1.1 km	MPC · JPL
385651	2005 RZ_{14}	—	September 1, 2005	Kitt Peak	Spacewatch	·	960 m	MPC · JPL
385652	2005 RU_{21}	—	September 6, 2005	Anderson Mesa	LONEOS	·	3.5 km	MPC · JPL
385653	2005 RL_{23}	—	August 29, 2005	Kitt Peak	Spacewatch	·	1.3 km	MPC · JPL
385654	2005 RY_{23}	—	September 10, 2005	Anderson Mesa	LONEOS	·	1.8 km	MPC · JPL
385655	2005 RW_{40}	—	September 6, 2005	Anderson Mesa	LONEOS	·	900 m	MPC · JPL
385656	2005 RK_{51}	—	September 10, 2005	Anderson Mesa	LONEOS	·	3.4 km	MPC · JPL
385657	2005 SQ_{14}	—	September 25, 2005	Catalina	CSS	·	1.3 km	MPC · JPL
385658	2005 SS_{21}	—	September 26, 2005	Kitt Peak	Spacewatch	H	590 m	MPC · JPL
385659	2005 SZ_{35}	—	September 23, 2005	Kitt Peak	Spacewatch	·	1.1 km	MPC · JPL
385660	2005 SM_{47}	—	September 24, 2005	Kitt Peak	Spacewatch	·	1.3 km	MPC · JPL
385661	2005 SZ_{51}	—	September 24, 2005	Kitt Peak	Spacewatch	·	1.2 km	MPC · JPL
385662	2005 SH_{92}	—	September 24, 2005	Kitt Peak	Spacewatch	NYS	950 m	MPC · JPL
385663	2005 SH_{95}	—	September 25, 2005	Kitt Peak	Spacewatch	CLA	1.9 km	MPC · JPL
385664	2005 SG_{99}	—	September 25, 2005	Kitt Peak	Spacewatch	·	1.2 km	MPC · JPL
385665	2005 SR_{99}	—	September 25, 2005	Kitt Peak	Spacewatch	·	3.7 km	MPC · JPL
385666	2005 SH_{100}	—	September 25, 2005	Kitt Peak	Spacewatch	V	670 m	MPC · JPL
385667	2005 ST_{113}	—	September 27, 2005	Kitt Peak	Spacewatch	MAS	720 m	MPC · JPL
385668	2005 ST_{130}	—	September 29, 2005	Mount Lemmon	Mount Lemmon Survey	MAS	800 m	MPC · JPL
385669	2005 SS_{144}	—	September 25, 2005	Kitt Peak	Spacewatch	V	730 m	MPC · JPL
385670	2005 SD_{145}	—	September 25, 2005	Kitt Peak	Spacewatch	·	880 m	MPC · JPL
385671	2005 SB_{167}	—	September 14, 2005	Catalina	CSS	·	1.6 km	MPC · JPL
385672	2005 SK_{169}	—	September 29, 2005	Kitt Peak	Spacewatch	·	1.3 km	MPC · JPL
385673	2005 SD_{179}	—	September 29, 2005	Anderson Mesa	LONEOS	NYS	1.2 km	MPC · JPL
385674	2005 SW_{183}	—	September 29, 2005	Kitt Peak	Spacewatch	·	1.5 km	MPC · JPL
385675	2005 SY_{187}	—	September 29, 2005	Mount Lemmon	Mount Lemmon Survey	MAS	640 m	MPC · JPL
385676	2005 SR_{188}	—	September 29, 2005	Mount Lemmon	Mount Lemmon Survey	·	1.2 km	MPC · JPL
385677	2005 SS_{195}	—	September 30, 2005	Kitt Peak	Spacewatch	·	1.0 km	MPC · JPL
385678	2005 SQ_{204}	—	September 30, 2005	Anderson Mesa	LONEOS	·	1.4 km	MPC · JPL
385679	2005 SV_{206}	—	September 30, 2005	Mount Lemmon	Mount Lemmon Survey	MAS ·	810 m	MPC · JPL
385680	2005 SX_{206}	—	September 30, 2005	Mount Lemmon	Mount Lemmon Survey	MAS	520 m	MPC · JPL
385681	2005 SA_{211}	—	September 30, 2005	Palomar	NEAT	·	1.4 km	MPC · JPL
385682	2005 SN_{239}	—	September 30, 2005	Kitt Peak	Spacewatch	·	1 km	MPC · JPL
385683	2005 SA_{249}	—	September 30, 2005	Mount Lemmon	Mount Lemmon Survey	·	1.2 km	MPC · JPL
385684	2005 SF_{252}	—	September 24, 2005	Palomar	NEAT	fast	990 m	MPC · JPL
385685	2005 SK_{255}	—	September 22, 2005	Palomar	NEAT	·	1.2 km	MPC · JPL
385686	2005 SO_{260}	—	September 23, 2005	Kitt Peak	Spacewatch	·	4.8 km	MPC · JPL
385687	2005 SF_{286}	—	September 25, 2005	Apache Point	A. C. Becker	PHO	1.6 km	MPC · JPL
385688	2005 TK_{12}	—	October 1, 2005	Kitt Peak	Spacewatch	·	1.1 km	MPC · JPL
385689	2005 TP_{16}	—	October 1, 2005	Kitt Peak	Spacewatch	TIR	3.2 km	MPC · JPL
385690	2005 TM_{37}	—	September 14, 2005	Kitt Peak	Spacewatch	·	850 m	MPC · JPL
385691	2005 TX_{45}	—	September 30, 2005	Kitt Peak	Spacewatch	NYS	1.1 km	MPC · JPL
385692	2005 TH_{52}	—	October 5, 2005	Kitt Peak	Spacewatch	·	1.2 km	MPC · JPL
385693	2005 TR_{52}	—	October 11, 2005	Junk Bond	D. Healy	·	1.5 km	MPC · JPL
385694	2005 TV_{60}	—	October 3, 2005	Kitt Peak	Spacewatch	·	1.2 km	MPC · JPL
385695 Clete	2005 TO_{74}	Clete	October 8, 2005	Las Campanas	C. A. Trujillo, S. S. Sheppard	NT	111 km	MPC · JPL
385696	2005 TV_{100}	—	October 7, 2005	Catalina	CSS	CYB	4.0 km	MPC · JPL
385697	2005 TC_{104}	—	September 30, 2005	Catalina	CSS	·	1.5 km	MPC · JPL
385698	2005 TB_{114}	—	September 27, 2005	Kitt Peak	Spacewatch	·	940 m	MPC · JPL
385699	2005 TX_{121}	—	October 7, 2005	Kitt Peak	Spacewatch	NYS	1.2 km	MPC · JPL
385700	2005 TL_{153}	—	October 7, 2005	Mount Lemmon	Mount Lemmon Survey	·	1.3 km	MPC · JPL

== 385701–385800 ==
back to top

Designation			Discovery			Properties		Ref
Permanent	Provisional	Named after	Date	Site	Discoverer(s)	Category	Diam.	Ref
385701	2005 TZ_{158}	—	October 1, 2005	Mount Lemmon	Mount Lemmon Survey	·	980 m	MPC · JPL
385702	2005 UO_{9}	—	October 21, 2005	Palomar	NEAT	·	1.0 km	MPC · JPL
385703	2005 UO_{15}	—	October 22, 2005	Kitt Peak	Spacewatch	·	1.0 km	MPC · JPL
385704	2005 UH_{27}	—	October 1, 2005	Mount Lemmon	Mount Lemmon Survey	MAS	800 m	MPC · JPL
385705	2005 UJ_{28}	—	October 23, 2005	Kitt Peak	Spacewatch	NYS	1.4 km	MPC · JPL
385706	2005 UB_{30}	—	October 23, 2005	Catalina	CSS	MAS	830 m	MPC · JPL
385707	2005 UE_{46}	—	October 22, 2005	Kitt Peak	Spacewatch	·	1.0 km	MPC · JPL
385708	2005 UV_{48}	—	October 23, 2005	Kitt Peak	Spacewatch	NYS	1.3 km	MPC · JPL
385709	2005 UQ_{61}	—	October 25, 2005	Mount Lemmon	Mount Lemmon Survey	H	590 m	MPC · JPL
385710	2005 UJ_{71}	—	October 23, 2005	Catalina	CSS	·	1.6 km	MPC · JPL
385711	2005 UH_{84}	—	October 22, 2005	Kitt Peak	Spacewatch	·	1.1 km	MPC · JPL
385712	2005 UR_{98}	—	October 22, 2005	Palomar	NEAT	·	1.1 km	MPC · JPL
385713	2005 UJ_{103}	—	October 22, 2005	Kitt Peak	Spacewatch	NYS	1.1 km	MPC · JPL
385714	2005 UR_{103}	—	October 22, 2005	Kitt Peak	Spacewatch	MAS	850 m	MPC · JPL
385715	2005 UL_{117}	—	October 24, 2005	Kitt Peak	Spacewatch	·	1.1 km	MPC · JPL
385716	2005 UN_{119}	—	October 24, 2005	Kitt Peak	Spacewatch	NYS	1.3 km	MPC · JPL
385717	2005 UC_{127}	—	October 24, 2005	Kitt Peak	Spacewatch	MAS	570 m	MPC · JPL
385718	2005 UA_{154}	—	October 26, 2005	Kitt Peak	Spacewatch	MAS	660 m	MPC · JPL
385719	2005 UZ_{157}	—	October 27, 2005	Kitt Peak	Spacewatch	·	1 km	MPC · JPL
385720	2005 UV_{160}	—	October 22, 2005	Catalina	CSS	·	1.9 km	MPC · JPL
385721	2005 UB_{179}	—	October 24, 2005	Kitt Peak	Spacewatch	NYS	1.1 km	MPC · JPL
385722	2005 UR_{200}	—	October 25, 2005	Kitt Peak	Spacewatch	·	980 m	MPC · JPL
385723	2005 UY_{269}	—	October 28, 2005	Socorro	LINEAR	MAS	830 m	MPC · JPL
385724	2005 UB_{273}	—	October 28, 2005	Kitt Peak	Spacewatch	V	560 m	MPC · JPL
385725	2005 UR_{299}	—	October 26, 2005	Kitt Peak	Spacewatch	·	1 km	MPC · JPL
385726	2005 UQ_{302}	—	October 26, 2005	Kitt Peak	Spacewatch	·	1.4 km	MPC · JPL
385727	2005 UA_{338}	—	March 11, 2003	Kitt Peak	Spacewatch	MAS	600 m	MPC · JPL
385728	2005 UG_{350}	—	October 23, 2005	Catalina	CSS	·	880 m	MPC · JPL
385729	2005 UQ_{371}	—	October 27, 2005	Mount Lemmon	Mount Lemmon Survey	·	1.5 km	MPC · JPL
385730	2005 UH_{396}	—	October 25, 2005	Kitt Peak	Spacewatch	NYS	1.5 km	MPC · JPL
385731	2005 UP_{397}	—	October 28, 2005	Catalina	CSS	·	1.2 km	MPC · JPL
385732	2005 UF_{413}	—	October 31, 2005	Socorro	LINEAR	H	760 m	MPC · JPL
385733	2005 UG_{439}	—	October 29, 2005	Catalina	CSS	·	1.6 km	MPC · JPL
385734	2005 UQ_{444}	—	October 30, 2005	Catalina	CSS	H	710 m	MPC · JPL
385735	2005 VQ_{53}	—	November 4, 2005	Socorro	LINEAR	NYS	1.3 km	MPC · JPL
385736	2005 VP_{71}	—	November 1, 2005	Mount Lemmon	Mount Lemmon Survey	·	1.1 km	MPC · JPL
385737	2005 VQ_{79}	—	November 4, 2005	Mount Lemmon	Mount Lemmon Survey	·	1.0 km	MPC · JPL
385738	2005 VA_{114}	—	November 10, 2005	Mount Lemmon	Mount Lemmon Survey	MAS	820 m	MPC · JPL
385739	2005 VB_{130}	—	November 1, 2005	Apache Point	A. C. Becker	V	680 m	MPC · JPL
385740	2005 WK_{40}	—	November 25, 2005	Mount Lemmon	Mount Lemmon Survey	·	1.1 km	MPC · JPL
385741	2005 WY_{41}	—	October 31, 2005	Kitt Peak	Spacewatch	·	1.4 km	MPC · JPL
385742	2005 WX_{54}	—	October 30, 2005	Socorro	LINEAR	·	1.3 km	MPC · JPL
385743	2005 WM_{69}	—	November 26, 2005	Kitt Peak	Spacewatch	·	1.3 km	MPC · JPL
385744	2005 WV_{93}	—	November 26, 2005	Mount Lemmon	Mount Lemmon Survey	·	1.1 km	MPC · JPL
385745	2005 WG_{193}	—	November 26, 2005	Catalina	CSS	H	760 m	MPC · JPL
385746	2005 XH_{19}	—	December 2, 2005	Kitt Peak	Spacewatch	·	1.2 km	MPC · JPL
385747	2005 XC_{30}	—	December 1, 2005	Mount Lemmon	Mount Lemmon Survey	MAS	750 m	MPC · JPL
385748	2005 XU_{78}	—	December 2, 2005	Catalina	CSS	H	790 m	MPC · JPL
385749	2005 XR_{85}	—	December 2, 2005	Kitt Peak	Spacewatch	·	2.6 km	MPC · JPL
385750	2005 XJ_{112}	—	December 2, 2005	Kitt Peak	M. W. Buie	·	2.1 km	MPC · JPL
385751	2005 YQ_{7}	—	December 22, 2005	Kitt Peak	Spacewatch	·	1.5 km	MPC · JPL
385752	2005 YZ_{13}	—	December 22, 2005	Kitt Peak	Spacewatch	·	1.0 km	MPC · JPL
385753	2005 YY_{16}	—	December 23, 2005	Kitt Peak	Spacewatch	PHO	1.1 km	MPC · JPL
385754	2005 YG_{24}	—	December 24, 2005	Kitt Peak	Spacewatch	·	1.3 km	MPC · JPL
385755	2005 YQ_{24}	—	December 24, 2005	Kitt Peak	Spacewatch	·	1.3 km	MPC · JPL
385756	2005 YW_{30}	—	December 22, 2005	Kitt Peak	Spacewatch	·	1.1 km	MPC · JPL
385757	2005 YK_{32}	—	December 22, 2005	Kitt Peak	Spacewatch	·	1.8 km	MPC · JPL
385758	2005 YH_{55}	—	December 25, 2005	Kitt Peak	Spacewatch	·	870 m	MPC · JPL
385759	2005 YO_{69}	—	December 26, 2005	Kitt Peak	Spacewatch	NYS	1.1 km	MPC · JPL
385760	2005 YF_{71}	—	December 24, 2005	Kitt Peak	Spacewatch	(5)	2.1 km	MPC · JPL
385761	2005 YK_{74}	—	December 8, 2005	Kitt Peak	Spacewatch	·	1.1 km	MPC · JPL
385762	2005 YN_{75}	—	December 24, 2005	Kitt Peak	Spacewatch	·	1.2 km	MPC · JPL
385763	2005 YF_{76}	—	December 24, 2005	Kitt Peak	Spacewatch	·	1.2 km	MPC · JPL
385764	2005 YN_{79}	—	December 24, 2005	Kitt Peak	Spacewatch	·	1.3 km	MPC · JPL
385765	2005 YC_{114}	—	December 25, 2005	Kitt Peak	Spacewatch	·	1.6 km	MPC · JPL
385766	2005 YP_{121}	—	December 28, 2005	Catalina	CSS	(5)	1.3 km	MPC · JPL
385767	2005 YD_{128}	—	December 28, 2005	Mount Lemmon	Mount Lemmon Survey	NYS	1.7 km	MPC · JPL
385768	2005 YC_{144}	—	December 28, 2005	Mount Lemmon	Mount Lemmon Survey	·	1 km	MPC · JPL
385769	2005 YV_{144}	—	December 28, 2005	Mount Lemmon	Mount Lemmon Survey	EUN	950 m	MPC · JPL
385770	2005 YQ_{191}	—	December 30, 2005	Kitt Peak	Spacewatch	·	1.3 km	MPC · JPL
385771	2005 YE_{212}	—	December 28, 2005	Catalina	CSS	H	590 m	MPC · JPL
385772	2005 YO_{258}	—	December 22, 2005	Kitt Peak	Spacewatch	·	2.2 km	MPC · JPL
385773	2005 YB_{291}	—	December 28, 2005	Mount Lemmon	Mount Lemmon Survey	·	1.6 km	MPC · JPL
385774	2006 AA_{14}	—	December 25, 2005	Kitt Peak	Spacewatch	·	1.3 km	MPC · JPL
385775	2006 AE_{22}	—	December 5, 2005	Catalina	CSS	H	690 m	MPC · JPL
385776	2006 AD_{23}	—	January 4, 2006	Kitt Peak	Spacewatch	SUL	1.5 km	MPC · JPL
385777	2006 AJ_{53}	—	January 5, 2006	Kitt Peak	Spacewatch	·	940 m	MPC · JPL
385778	2006 AE_{74}	—	January 4, 2006	Catalina	CSS	H	700 m	MPC · JPL
385779	2006 AJ_{79}	—	January 6, 2006	Kitt Peak	Spacewatch	H	610 m	MPC · JPL
385780	2006 AO_{95}	—	January 9, 2006	Kitt Peak	Spacewatch	3:2 · SHU	4.4 km	MPC · JPL
385781	2006 BR	—	January 20, 2006	Socorro	LINEAR	H	620 m	MPC · JPL
385782	2006 BG_{42}	—	January 23, 2006	Kitt Peak	Spacewatch	3:2	4.1 km	MPC · JPL
385783	2006 BV_{50}	—	December 24, 2005	Kitt Peak	Spacewatch	3:2 · SHU	4.7 km	MPC · JPL
385784	2006 BK_{65}	—	January 23, 2006	Kitt Peak	Spacewatch	·	1.2 km	MPC · JPL
385785	2006 BA_{75}	—	January 23, 2006	Kitt Peak	Spacewatch	·	1.1 km	MPC · JPL
385786	2006 BC_{75}	—	January 23, 2006	Kitt Peak	Spacewatch	·	920 m	MPC · JPL
385787	2006 BM_{76}	—	January 23, 2006	Kitt Peak	Spacewatch	·	1.1 km	MPC · JPL
385788	2006 BY_{86}	—	January 25, 2006	Kitt Peak	Spacewatch	·	1.1 km	MPC · JPL
385789	2006 BT_{100}	—	January 23, 2006	Kitt Peak	Spacewatch	·	960 m	MPC · JPL
385790	2006 BG_{108}	—	January 25, 2006	Kitt Peak	Spacewatch	·	1.3 km	MPC · JPL
385791	2006 BN_{114}	—	January 25, 2006	Kitt Peak	Spacewatch	HNS	1.3 km	MPC · JPL
385792	2006 BV_{127}	—	January 26, 2006	Kitt Peak	Spacewatch	EUN	1.2 km	MPC · JPL
385793	2006 BV_{178}	—	January 27, 2006	Anderson Mesa	LONEOS	·	1.7 km	MPC · JPL
385794	2006 BY_{181}	—	January 27, 2006	Mount Lemmon	Mount Lemmon Survey	·	1.1 km	MPC · JPL
385795	2006 BJ_{265}	—	January 31, 2006	Kitt Peak	Spacewatch	·	770 m	MPC · JPL
385796	2006 BF_{277}	—	January 30, 2006	Kitt Peak	Spacewatch	·	1.3 km	MPC · JPL
385797	2006 BV_{277}	—	January 30, 2006	Kitt Peak	Spacewatch	·	1.5 km	MPC · JPL
385798	2006 BF_{281}	—	January 30, 2006	Kitt Peak	Spacewatch	·	1.1 km	MPC · JPL
385799	2006 CZ	—	February 3, 2006	Socorro	LINEAR	H	700 m	MPC · JPL
385800	2006 CA_{1}	—	February 3, 2006	Socorro	LINEAR	H	630 m	MPC · JPL

== 385801–385900 ==
back to top

Designation			Discovery			Properties		Ref
Permanent	Provisional	Named after	Date	Site	Discoverer(s)	Category	Diam.	Ref
385801	2006 CS_{18}	—	February 1, 2006	Kitt Peak	Spacewatch	·	1.1 km	MPC · JPL
385802	2006 DO_{11}	—	February 21, 2006	Catalina	CSS	·	1.5 km	MPC · JPL
385803	2006 DL_{23}	—	February 20, 2006	Kitt Peak	Spacewatch	ADE	2.1 km	MPC · JPL
385804	2006 DS_{23}	—	February 20, 2006	Kitt Peak	Spacewatch	·	2.2 km	MPC · JPL
385805	2006 DO_{37}	—	February 20, 2006	Mount Lemmon	Mount Lemmon Survey	·	2.5 km	MPC · JPL
385806	2006 DT_{52}	—	February 24, 2006	Kitt Peak	Spacewatch	·	910 m	MPC · JPL
385807	2006 DH_{57}	—	February 24, 2006	Catalina	CSS	·	2.6 km	MPC · JPL
385808	2006 DO_{67}	—	February 22, 2006	Catalina	CSS	H	760 m	MPC · JPL
385809	2006 DV_{91}	—	February 24, 2006	Mount Lemmon	Mount Lemmon Survey	·	920 m	MPC · JPL
385810	2006 DB_{120}	—	February 20, 2006	Catalina	CSS	·	4.5 km	MPC · JPL
385811	2006 DL_{121}	—	January 23, 2006	Kitt Peak	Spacewatch	·	2.8 km	MPC · JPL
385812	2006 DC_{156}	—	February 27, 2006	Kitt Peak	Spacewatch	KON	2.4 km	MPC · JPL
385813	2006 DX_{161}	—	February 27, 2006	Mount Lemmon	Mount Lemmon Survey	·	930 m	MPC · JPL
385814	2006 DX_{198}	—	February 27, 2006	Catalina	CSS	·	2.3 km	MPC · JPL
385815	2006 EP_{16}	—	March 2, 2006	Kitt Peak	Spacewatch	·	1.1 km	MPC · JPL
385816	2006 EN_{28}	—	March 3, 2006	Kitt Peak	Spacewatch	·	940 m	MPC · JPL
385817	2006 EW_{69}	—	March 2, 2006	Mount Lemmon	Mount Lemmon Survey	·	1.5 km	MPC · JPL
385818	2006 FK_{7}	—	March 23, 2006	Kitt Peak	Spacewatch	·	1.5 km	MPC · JPL
385819	2006 FE_{14}	—	March 23, 2006	Kitt Peak	Spacewatch	·	1.2 km	MPC · JPL
385820	2006 FH_{28}	—	March 24, 2006	Mount Lemmon	Mount Lemmon Survey	·	2.3 km	MPC · JPL
385821	2006 FZ_{50}	—	March 24, 2006	Catalina	CSS	·	2.1 km	MPC · JPL
385822	2006 FW_{53}	—	March 24, 2006	Kitt Peak	Spacewatch	·	2.2 km	MPC · JPL
385823	2006 GN_{2}	—	March 9, 2006	Kitt Peak	Spacewatch	·	1.4 km	MPC · JPL
385824	2006 GW_{6}	—	April 2, 2006	Kitt Peak	Spacewatch	·	1.3 km	MPC · JPL
385825	2006 GG_{12}	—	April 2, 2006	Kitt Peak	Spacewatch	·	2.9 km	MPC · JPL
385826	2006 GW_{28}	—	April 2, 2006	Kitt Peak	Spacewatch	·	1.2 km	MPC · JPL
385827	2006 GB_{32}	—	April 6, 2006	Catalina	CSS	JUN	1.5 km	MPC · JPL
385828	2006 GJ_{32}	—	April 7, 2006	Kitt Peak	Spacewatch	·	1.8 km	MPC · JPL
385829	2006 GQ_{54}	—	April 8, 2006	Kitt Peak	Spacewatch	DOR	2.0 km	MPC · JPL
385830	2006 HE_{3}	—	April 18, 2006	Kitt Peak	Spacewatch	·	2.0 km	MPC · JPL
385831	2006 HJ_{11}	—	December 18, 2004	Mount Lemmon	Mount Lemmon Survey	·	1.9 km	MPC · JPL
385832	2006 HQ_{25}	—	April 20, 2006	Kitt Peak	Spacewatch	·	1.5 km	MPC · JPL
385833	2006 HJ_{31}	—	April 18, 2006	Anderson Mesa	LONEOS	·	1.6 km	MPC · JPL
385834	2006 HH_{43}	—	April 24, 2006	Mount Lemmon	Mount Lemmon Survey	EUN	1.4 km	MPC · JPL
385835	2006 HP_{71}	—	April 25, 2006	Kitt Peak	Spacewatch	·	2.1 km	MPC · JPL
385836	2006 HE_{74}	—	April 25, 2006	Kitt Peak	Spacewatch	·	1.9 km	MPC · JPL
385837	2006 HP_{79}	—	April 26, 2006	Kitt Peak	Spacewatch	·	2.6 km	MPC · JPL
385838	2006 HW_{90}	—	April 29, 2006	Kitt Peak	Spacewatch	·	1.4 km	MPC · JPL
385839	2006 HS_{103}	—	April 30, 2006	Kitt Peak	Spacewatch	·	2.9 km	MPC · JPL
385840	2006 HF_{105}	—	April 23, 2006	Catalina	CSS	·	1.7 km	MPC · JPL
385841	2006 HA_{109}	—	April 30, 2006	Catalina	CSS	·	2.0 km	MPC · JPL
385842	2006 HV_{109}	—	April 30, 2006	Kitt Peak	Spacewatch	·	2.7 km	MPC · JPL
385843	2006 JY_{25}	—	May 6, 2006	Mount Lemmon	Mount Lemmon Survey	APO	270 m	MPC · JPL
385844	2006 JF_{52}	—	May 4, 2006	Kitt Peak	Spacewatch	·	2.7 km	MPC · JPL
385845	2006 KB_{3}	—	May 18, 2006	Palomar	NEAT	·	3.0 km	MPC · JPL
385846	2006 KK_{9}	—	March 23, 2006	Kitt Peak	Spacewatch	·	1.5 km	MPC · JPL
385847	2006 KZ_{27}	—	September 27, 2003	Kitt Peak	Spacewatch	·	1.5 km	MPC · JPL
385848	2006 KD_{30}	—	May 1, 2006	Kitt Peak	Spacewatch	KOR	1.6 km	MPC · JPL
385849	2006 KC_{60}	—	May 22, 2006	Kitt Peak	Spacewatch	·	1.8 km	MPC · JPL
385850	2006 KF_{65}	—	May 24, 2006	Kitt Peak	Spacewatch	·	2.7 km	MPC · JPL
385851	2006 LV_{2}	—	June 5, 2006	Socorro	LINEAR	·	1.6 km	MPC · JPL
385852	2006 OQ_{5}	—	July 22, 2006	Palomar	NEAT	·	2.7 km	MPC · JPL
385853	2006 PU_{35}	—	August 12, 2006	Palomar	NEAT	·	3.5 km	MPC · JPL
385854	2006 QQ_{10}	—	August 19, 2006	Piszkéstető	K. Sárneczky, Kuli, Z.	·	3.9 km	MPC · JPL
385855	2006 QE_{64}	—	August 25, 2006	Socorro	LINEAR	·	2.6 km	MPC · JPL
385856	2006 QH_{110}	—	August 28, 2006	Kitt Peak	Spacewatch	URS	3.6 km	MPC · JPL
385857	2006 QZ_{136}	—	August 16, 2006	Palomar	NEAT	KOR	2.0 km	MPC · JPL
385858	2006 QC_{150}	—	August 19, 2006	Kitt Peak	Spacewatch	EOS	3.2 km	MPC · JPL
385859	2006 QY_{150}	—	August 19, 2006	Kitt Peak	Spacewatch	EOS	2.1 km	MPC · JPL
385860	2006 QG_{151}	—	August 19, 2006	Kitt Peak	Spacewatch	·	1.6 km	MPC · JPL
385861	2006 QQ_{151}	—	April 5, 2005	Mount Lemmon	Mount Lemmon Survey	·	2.2 km	MPC · JPL
385862	2006 QK_{184}	—	August 18, 2006	Kitt Peak	Spacewatch	·	3.2 km	MPC · JPL
385863	2006 RE_{14}	—	September 14, 2006	Kitt Peak	Spacewatch	·	3.0 km	MPC · JPL
385864	2006 RR_{15}	—	August 27, 2006	Anderson Mesa	LONEOS	T_{j} (2.97)	3.6 km	MPC · JPL
385865	2006 RF_{21}	—	September 15, 2006	Kitt Peak	Spacewatch	·	2.6 km	MPC · JPL
385866	2006 RS_{22}	—	September 15, 2006	Goodricke-Pigott	R. A. Tucker	·	3.7 km	MPC · JPL
385867	2006 RW_{29}	—	September 15, 2006	Kitt Peak	Spacewatch	EOS	1.7 km	MPC · JPL
385868	2006 RU_{36}	—	September 12, 2006	Catalina	CSS	·	3.2 km	MPC · JPL
385869	2006 RJ_{64}	—	September 12, 2006	Catalina	CSS	LIX	4.0 km	MPC · JPL
385870	2006 RL_{66}	—	September 14, 2006	Kitt Peak	Spacewatch	·	2.7 km	MPC · JPL
385871	2006 RS_{71}	—	September 15, 2006	Kitt Peak	Spacewatch	·	3.0 km	MPC · JPL
385872	2006 RU_{71}	—	September 15, 2006	Kitt Peak	Spacewatch	·	3.7 km	MPC · JPL
385873	2006 RA_{74}	—	September 15, 2006	Kitt Peak	Spacewatch	·	2.3 km	MPC · JPL
385874	2006 RC_{83}	—	September 15, 2006	Kitt Peak	Spacewatch	·	590 m	MPC · JPL
385875	2006 RJ_{101}	—	September 1, 2006	Siding Spring	SSS	PHO	1.2 km	MPC · JPL
385876	2006 SM_{16}	—	September 17, 2006	Kitt Peak	Spacewatch	·	730 m	MPC · JPL
385877	2006 SO_{16}	—	September 17, 2006	Catalina	CSS	·	3.3 km	MPC · JPL
385878	2006 SY_{31}	—	September 17, 2006	Kitt Peak	Spacewatch	·	3.0 km	MPC · JPL
385879	2006 SV_{35}	—	September 17, 2006	Anderson Mesa	LONEOS	·	670 m	MPC · JPL
385880	2006 SB_{77}	—	September 18, 2006	Calvin-Rehoboth	Calvin College	·	610 m	MPC · JPL
385881	2006 SP_{89}	—	September 18, 2006	Kitt Peak	Spacewatch	·	720 m	MPC · JPL
385882	2006 SG_{92}	—	September 18, 2006	Kitt Peak	Spacewatch	·	610 m	MPC · JPL
385883	2006 SO_{125}	—	September 20, 2006	Catalina	CSS	·	4.0 km	MPC · JPL
385884	2006 SO_{131}	—	September 26, 2006	Catalina	CSS	·	320 m	MPC · JPL
385885	2006 SB_{141}	—	September 25, 2006	Anderson Mesa	LONEOS	·	900 m	MPC · JPL
385886	2006 SF_{157}	—	September 23, 2006	Kitt Peak	Spacewatch	·	2.0 km	MPC · JPL
385887	2006 SR_{167}	—	September 25, 2006	Kitt Peak	Spacewatch	ARM	4.0 km	MPC · JPL
385888	2006 SV_{181}	—	September 25, 2006	Anderson Mesa	LONEOS	·	4.7 km	MPC · JPL
385889	2006 SF_{207}	—	September 25, 2006	Kitt Peak	Spacewatch	·	700 m	MPC · JPL
385890	2006 SU_{225}	—	September 26, 2006	Kitt Peak	Spacewatch	·	2.1 km	MPC · JPL
385891	2006 SC_{227}	—	September 26, 2006	Kitt Peak	Spacewatch	·	2.9 km	MPC · JPL
385892	2006 SC_{232}	—	September 26, 2006	Kitt Peak	Spacewatch	EOS	1.9 km	MPC · JPL
385893	2006 SJ_{232}	—	September 26, 2006	Kitt Peak	Spacewatch	·	2.8 km	MPC · JPL
385894	2006 SO_{233}	—	September 26, 2006	Kitt Peak	Spacewatch	·	2.9 km	MPC · JPL
385895	2006 SO_{234}	—	September 18, 2006	Kitt Peak	Spacewatch	EOS	2.6 km	MPC · JPL
385896	2006 SN_{257}	—	September 19, 2006	Kitt Peak	Spacewatch	·	3.4 km	MPC · JPL
385897	2006 SG_{258}	—	April 17, 2005	Kitt Peak	Spacewatch	·	730 m	MPC · JPL
385898	2006 SD_{275}	—	September 27, 2006	Mount Lemmon	Mount Lemmon Survey	·	1.2 km	MPC · JPL
385899	2006 SZ_{306}	—	September 27, 2006	Kitt Peak	Spacewatch	EOS	2.3 km	MPC · JPL
385900	2006 SL_{320}	—	September 27, 2006	Kitt Peak	Spacewatch	·	2.4 km	MPC · JPL

== 385901–386000 ==
back to top

Designation			Discovery			Properties		Ref
Permanent	Provisional	Named after	Date	Site	Discoverer(s)	Category	Diam.	Ref
385901	2006 SK_{343}	—	September 28, 2006	Kitt Peak	Spacewatch	·	780 m	MPC · JPL
385902	2006 SK_{352}	—	September 30, 2006	Catalina	CSS	·	3.2 km	MPC · JPL
385903	2006 SU_{357}	—	September 30, 2006	Mount Lemmon	Mount Lemmon Survey	·	3.6 km	MPC · JPL
385904	2006 SW_{375}	—	September 17, 2006	Apache Point	A. C. Becker	(159)	3.2 km	MPC · JPL
385905	2006 SX_{375}	—	September 17, 2006	Apache Point	A. C. Becker	·	2.8 km	MPC · JPL
385906	2006 SH_{379}	—	September 19, 2006	Apache Point	A. C. Becker	·	2.2 km	MPC · JPL
385907	2006 SF_{386}	—	September 29, 2006	Apache Point	A. C. Becker	URS	3.5 km	MPC · JPL
385908	2006 SU_{396}	—	September 18, 2006	Kitt Peak	Spacewatch	HYG	2.8 km	MPC · JPL
385909	2006 SY_{402}	—	September 26, 2006	Mount Lemmon	Mount Lemmon Survey	THM	2.6 km	MPC · JPL
385910	2006 SX_{407}	—	September 25, 2006	Mount Lemmon	Mount Lemmon Survey	·	3.2 km	MPC · JPL
385911	2006 SF_{408}	—	September 28, 2006	Mount Lemmon	Mount Lemmon Survey	·	490 m	MPC · JPL
385912	2006 SN_{412}	—	September 30, 2006	Mount Lemmon	Mount Lemmon Survey	·	680 m	MPC · JPL
385913	2006 TO_{26}	—	September 26, 2006	Mount Lemmon	Mount Lemmon Survey	·	710 m	MPC · JPL
385914	2006 TS_{31}	—	September 25, 2006	Mount Lemmon	Mount Lemmon Survey	·	560 m	MPC · JPL
385915	2006 TN_{34}	—	October 12, 2006	Kitt Peak	Spacewatch	·	620 m	MPC · JPL
385916	2006 TC_{38}	—	October 12, 2006	Kitt Peak	Spacewatch	·	2.7 km	MPC · JPL
385917	2006 TC_{39}	—	October 12, 2006	Kitt Peak	Spacewatch	·	610 m	MPC · JPL
385918	2006 TM_{39}	—	October 12, 2006	Kitt Peak	Spacewatch	·	580 m	MPC · JPL
385919	2006 TH_{47}	—	October 12, 2006	Kitt Peak	Spacewatch	·	630 m	MPC · JPL
385920	2006 TV_{72}	—	September 26, 2006	Kitt Peak	Spacewatch	·	670 m	MPC · JPL
385921	2006 TC_{74}	—	October 11, 2006	Palomar	NEAT	·	3.1 km	MPC · JPL
385922	2006 TG_{101}	—	October 15, 2006	Kitt Peak	Spacewatch	·	750 m	MPC · JPL
385923	2006 TB_{103}	—	October 15, 2006	Kitt Peak	Spacewatch	·	2.8 km	MPC · JPL
385924	2006 TS_{113}	—	October 1, 2006	Apache Point	A. C. Becker	(31811)	2.7 km	MPC · JPL
385925	2006 TG_{115}	—	October 1, 2006	Apache Point	A. C. Becker	·	2.8 km	MPC · JPL
385926	2006 TE_{116}	—	October 2, 2006	Apache Point	A. C. Becker	·	2.9 km	MPC · JPL
385927	2006 TM_{116}	—	October 2, 2006	Apache Point	A. C. Becker	LIX	4.2 km	MPC · JPL
385928	2006 UK_{4}	—	October 16, 2006	Kitt Peak	Spacewatch	·	3.7 km	MPC · JPL
385929	2006 UC_{11}	—	September 26, 2006	Mount Lemmon	Mount Lemmon Survey	·	500 m	MPC · JPL
385930	2006 UD_{62}	—	October 17, 2006	Kitt Peak	Spacewatch	·	600 m	MPC · JPL
385931	2006 UR_{63}	—	October 16, 2006	Catalina	CSS	·	3.1 km	MPC · JPL
385932	2006 UX_{72}	—	October 17, 2006	Kitt Peak	Spacewatch	·	3.0 km	MPC · JPL
385933	2006 UJ_{82}	—	October 17, 2006	Mount Lemmon	Mount Lemmon Survey	·	810 m	MPC · JPL
385934	2006 UU_{88}	—	October 17, 2006	Kitt Peak	Spacewatch	·	1.0 km	MPC · JPL
385935	2006 UB_{94}	—	October 2, 2006	Mount Lemmon	Mount Lemmon Survey	·	3.7 km	MPC · JPL
385936	2006 UF_{104}	—	October 18, 2006	Kitt Peak	Spacewatch	·	610 m	MPC · JPL
385937	2006 UT_{110}	—	October 19, 2006	Kitt Peak	Spacewatch	·	2.9 km	MPC · JPL
385938	2006 UP_{113}	—	September 25, 2006	Kitt Peak	Spacewatch	·	740 m	MPC · JPL
385939	2006 UR_{118}	—	October 19, 2006	Kitt Peak	Spacewatch	·	650 m	MPC · JPL
385940	2006 UW_{129}	—	October 19, 2006	Kitt Peak	Spacewatch	·	560 m	MPC · JPL
385941	2006 UN_{133}	—	October 19, 2006	Kitt Peak	Spacewatch	·	630 m	MPC · JPL
385942	2006 UA_{174}	—	October 19, 2006	Catalina	CSS	·	790 m	MPC · JPL
385943	2006 UK_{187}	—	September 28, 2006	Catalina	CSS	·	4.8 km	MPC · JPL
385944	2006 UW_{187}	—	September 28, 2006	Catalina	CSS	·	3.2 km	MPC · JPL
385945	2006 UQ_{196}	—	October 20, 2006	Kitt Peak	Spacewatch	·	560 m	MPC · JPL
385946	2006 UD_{199}	—	October 12, 2006	Kitt Peak	Spacewatch	·	2.8 km	MPC · JPL
385947	2006 UD_{217}	—	October 27, 2006	Mount Lemmon	Mount Lemmon Survey	·	870 m	MPC · JPL
385948	2006 UN_{222}	—	October 17, 2006	Catalina	CSS	·	850 m	MPC · JPL
385949	2006 UX_{266}	—	October 27, 2006	Catalina	CSS	·	930 m	MPC · JPL
385950	2006 UY_{296}	—	October 19, 2006	Kitt Peak	M. W. Buie	EOS	2.3 km	MPC · JPL
385951	2006 VD_{4}	—	November 9, 2006	Kitt Peak	Spacewatch	·	600 m	MPC · JPL
385952	2006 VV_{7}	—	November 10, 2006	Kitt Peak	Spacewatch	·	850 m	MPC · JPL
385953	2006 VQ_{26}	—	November 10, 2006	Kitt Peak	Spacewatch	·	990 m	MPC · JPL
385954	2006 VO_{27}	—	November 10, 2006	Kitt Peak	Spacewatch	·	820 m	MPC · JPL
385955	2006 VV_{42}	—	November 12, 2006	Mount Lemmon	Mount Lemmon Survey	·	740 m	MPC · JPL
385956	2006 VX_{53}	—	November 11, 2006	Kitt Peak	Spacewatch	CYB	2.8 km	MPC · JPL
385957	2006 VK_{60}	—	October 19, 2006	Mount Lemmon	Mount Lemmon Survey	CYB	3.1 km	MPC · JPL
385958	2006 VX_{63}	—	November 11, 2006	Kitt Peak	Spacewatch	·	830 m	MPC · JPL
385959	2006 VX_{71}	—	October 3, 2006	Mount Lemmon	Mount Lemmon Survey	·	3.5 km	MPC · JPL
385960	2006 VC_{87}	—	November 14, 2006	Catalina	CSS	·	690 m	MPC · JPL
385961	2006 VL_{126}	—	October 3, 2006	Kitt Peak	Spacewatch	·	2.9 km	MPC · JPL
385962	2006 VK_{141}	—	November 13, 2006	Kitt Peak	Spacewatch	·	3.6 km	MPC · JPL
385963	2006 WM_{37}	—	November 16, 2006	Kitt Peak	Spacewatch	·	3.0 km	MPC · JPL
385964	2006 WM_{157}	—	November 22, 2006	Catalina	CSS	·	810 m	MPC · JPL
385965	2006 WU_{163}	—	November 23, 2006	Kitt Peak	Spacewatch	·	840 m	MPC · JPL
385966	2006 WX_{166}	—	November 23, 2006	Kitt Peak	Spacewatch	·	600 m	MPC · JPL
385967	2006 WE_{170}	—	November 23, 2006	Kitt Peak	Spacewatch	·	730 m	MPC · JPL
385968	2006 WF_{174}	—	November 23, 2006	Kitt Peak	Spacewatch	(2076)	770 m	MPC · JPL
385969	2006 WE_{184}	—	November 25, 2006	Kitt Peak	Spacewatch	·	840 m	MPC · JPL
385970	2006 WJ_{184}	—	November 25, 2006	Mount Lemmon	Mount Lemmon Survey	·	1.2 km	MPC · JPL
385971	2006 WL_{185}	—	November 20, 2006	Kitt Peak	Spacewatch	·	820 m	MPC · JPL
385972	2006 WG_{195}	—	November 29, 2006	Socorro	LINEAR	·	800 m	MPC · JPL
385973	2006 XW_{5}	—	December 7, 2006	Palomar	NEAT	·	700 m	MPC · JPL
385974	2006 XK_{17}	—	December 10, 2006	Kitt Peak	Spacewatch	·	860 m	MPC · JPL
385975	2006 XV_{59}	—	December 14, 2006	Kitt Peak	Spacewatch	·	540 m	MPC · JPL
385976	2006 YM_{8}	—	December 20, 2006	Mount Lemmon	Mount Lemmon Survey	·	890 m	MPC · JPL
385977	2006 YJ_{37}	—	December 21, 2006	Kitt Peak	Spacewatch	·	790 m	MPC · JPL
385978	2006 YO_{40}	—	December 22, 2006	Kitt Peak	Spacewatch	·	750 m	MPC · JPL
385979	2006 YO_{41}	—	December 22, 2006	Socorro	LINEAR	·	1.3 km	MPC · JPL
385980 Emiliosegrè	2007 AA_{8}	Emiliosegrè	January 9, 2007	Vallemare Borbona	V. S. Casulli	·	720 m	MPC · JPL
385981	2007 AH_{27}	—	January 10, 2007	Mount Lemmon	Mount Lemmon Survey	·	700 m	MPC · JPL
385982	2007 AE_{29}	—	January 10, 2007	Mount Lemmon	Mount Lemmon Survey	·	920 m	MPC · JPL
385983	2007 AU_{29}	—	January 10, 2007	Mount Lemmon	Mount Lemmon Survey	·	1.2 km	MPC · JPL
385984	2007 BE_{24}	—	January 24, 2007	Mount Lemmon	Mount Lemmon Survey	·	890 m	MPC · JPL
385985	2007 BP_{41}	—	January 24, 2007	Mount Lemmon	Mount Lemmon Survey	·	770 m	MPC · JPL
385986	2007 BL_{46}	—	January 26, 2007	Kitt Peak	Spacewatch	·	830 m	MPC · JPL
385987	2007 BL_{60}	—	January 17, 2007	Kitt Peak	Spacewatch	·	1.0 km	MPC · JPL
385988	2007 BM_{61}	—	January 27, 2007	Mount Lemmon	Mount Lemmon Survey	·	830 m	MPC · JPL
385989	2007 BN_{74}	—	January 17, 2007	Kitt Peak	Spacewatch	·	630 m	MPC · JPL
385990	2007 BQ_{75}	—	January 17, 2007	Kitt Peak	Spacewatch	·	1 km	MPC · JPL
385991	2007 BR_{79}	—	January 29, 2007	Kitt Peak	Spacewatch	·	900 m	MPC · JPL
385992	2007 BG_{81}	—	January 27, 2007	Kitt Peak	Spacewatch	·	870 m	MPC · JPL
385993	2007 BA_{102}	—	January 28, 2007	Mount Lemmon	Mount Lemmon Survey	NYS	1 km	MPC · JPL
385994	2007 CQ_{9}	—	December 27, 2006	Mount Lemmon	Mount Lemmon Survey	V	780 m	MPC · JPL
385995	2007 CW_{12}	—	February 6, 2007	Mount Lemmon	Mount Lemmon Survey	·	690 m	MPC · JPL
385996	2007 CL_{14}	—	February 7, 2007	Mount Lemmon	Mount Lemmon Survey	NYS	850 m	MPC · JPL
385997	2007 CN_{35}	—	February 6, 2007	Mount Lemmon	Mount Lemmon Survey	·	740 m	MPC · JPL
385998	2007 CU_{42}	—	February 7, 2007	Mount Lemmon	Mount Lemmon Survey	·	760 m	MPC · JPL
385999	2007 CB_{43}	—	February 7, 2007	Mount Lemmon	Mount Lemmon Survey	·	940 m	MPC · JPL
386000	2007 CG_{50}	—	February 8, 2007	Palomar	NEAT	·	840 m	MPC · JPL

back to top

== See also ==
- Meanings of minor-planet names: 385001–386000
