= Astronomical Observatory of Mallorca =

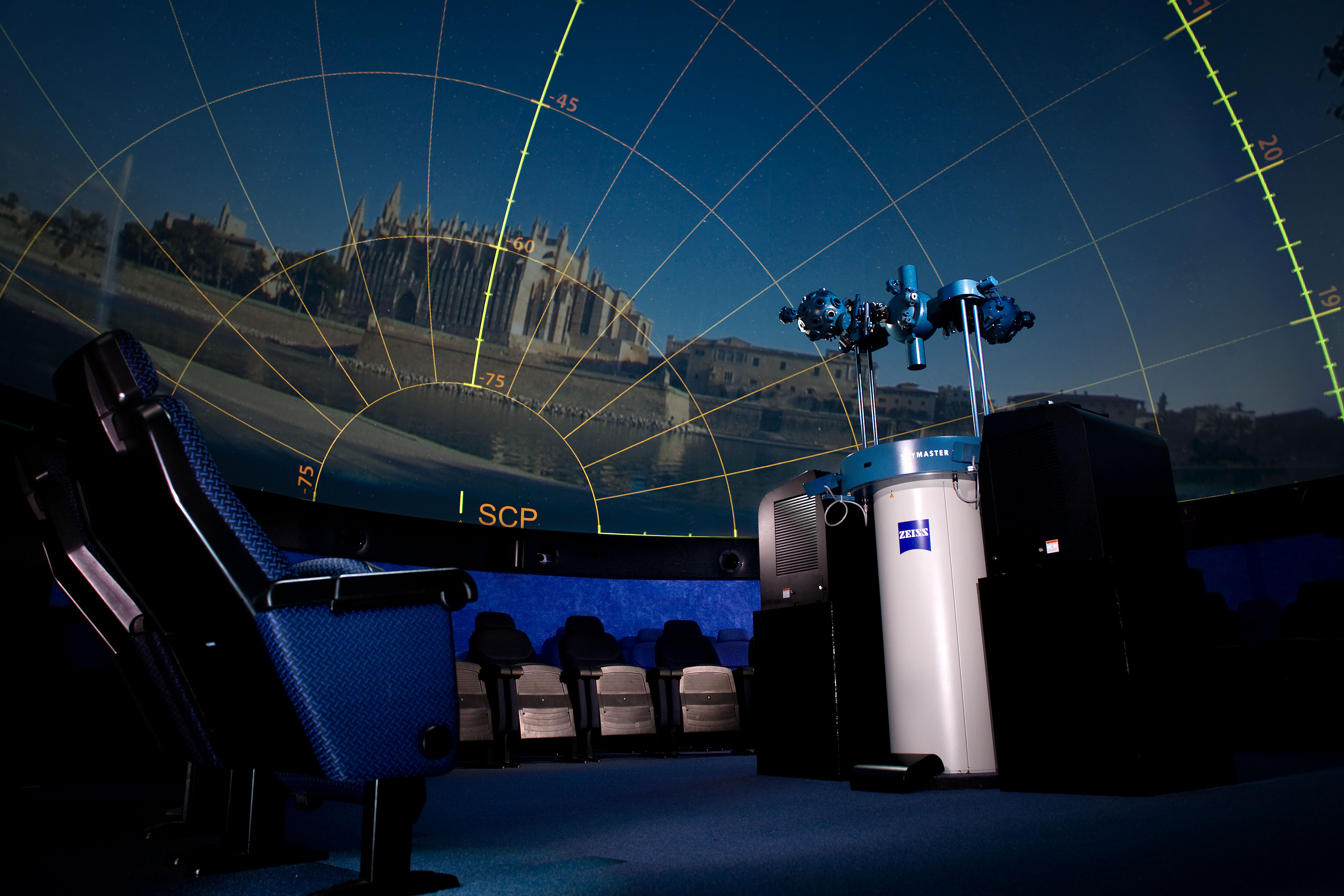
- Alternative names: ca
- Observatory code: 620
- Location: Costitx, Mallorca, Spain
- Coordinates: 39.642528°N 2.950516°E
- Established: May 1991
- Website: http://www.oam.es/

Minor planets discovered: 2087
see § List of discovered minor planets

The Astronomical Observatory of Mallorca (Spanish: Observatorio Astronómico de Mallorca, OAM) is an observatory just south of Costitx, Mallorca, Spain.

The observatory was inaugurated in May 1991 and was the first astronomical center in the Balearic Islands autonomous community and province of Spain.

The observatory is a pioneer among Spanish observatories and uses robotic telescopes (four of them located at La Sagra in Andalucia) to discover and track asteroids.

Researchers at the OAM have found asteroids that are potential threats to Earth, such as the 2006 WH_{1}. Salvador Sánchez is director of the OAM. In 2008, asteroid number 128036, discovered at the OAM in 2003, was named after Spanish tennis player Rafael Nadal. As of 2008, the OAM tracks more than 2,000 asteroids.

There is a large planetarium attached to the observatory, which often runs performances open to the public. The Open University is one of a number of academic institutions which runs summer schools at the observatory.

In March 2017, the observatory has closed and gone into liquidation. The land will be up for auction at €1.7 million.

== List of discovered minor planets ==
| 73533 Alonso | 25 July 2003 | list |
| 115210 Mutvicens | 19 September 2003 | list |
| 120141 Lucaslara | 7 April 2003 | list |
| 128036 Rafaelnadal | 28 May 2003 | list |
| (129760) 1999 GO_{2} | 5 April 1999 | list |
| 160575 Manuelblasco | 13 April 1999 | list |
| 164589 La Sagra | 11 August 2007 | list |
| 166974 Joanbinimelis | 24 July 2003 | list |
| 170193 Joanguillem | 24 July 2003 | list |
| 171424 Rudyfernandez | 13 July 2007 | list |
| 171458 Pepaprats | 7 October 2007 | list |
| 175625 Canaryastroinst | 23 July 2007 | list |
| 178267 Sarajevo | 31 December 2007 | list |
| 181419 Dragonera | 28 September 2006 | list |
| 185101 Balearicuni | 19 September 2006 | list |
| 185164 Ingeburgherz | 27 September 2006 | list |
| 185498 Majorcastroinst | 17 September 2007 | list |
| (185528) 2007 VR_{243} | 11 November 2007 | list |
| 185560 Harrykroto | 7 January 2008 | list |
| 185561 Miquelsiquier | 12 January 2008 | list |
| (185562) 2008 AU_{32} | 13 January 2008 | list |
| 185578 Agustinelcasta | 28 January 2008 | list |
| 185579 Jorgejuan | 29 January 2008 | list |
| 185580 Andratx | 29 January 2008 | list |
| (185587) 2008 BR_{24} | 30 January 2008 | list |

| 185638 Erwinschwab | 1 March 2008 | list |
| 185639 Rainerkling | 2 March 2008 | list |
| (187668) 2008 BB_{39} | 30 January 2008 | list |
| 187669 Obastromca | 5 February 2008 | list |
| 187700 Zagreb | 2 March 2008 | list |
| (188994) 2008 HH_{3} | 27 April 2008 | list |
| 189848 Eivissa | 23 March 2003 | list |
| (190272) 2008 NO_{2} | 9 July 2008 | list |
| (200023) 2007 OU_{6} | 25 July 2007 | list |
| (200049) 2008 NM_{2} | 8 July 2008 | list |
| (200054) 2008 PV_{8} | 6 August 2008 | list |
| (200055) 2008 PO_{9} | 8 August 2008 | list |
| (200056) 2008 PB_{15} | 10 August 2008 | list |
| (200059) 2008 QZ_{7} | 25 August 2008 | list |
| (200060) 2008 QD_{8} | 25 August 2008 | list |
| (200061) 2008 QQ_{8} | 25 August 2008 | list |
| (200062) 2008 QT_{16} | 26 August 2008 | list |
| (200063) 2008 QX_{25} | 24 August 2008 | list |
| 201511 Ferreret | 24 July 2003 | list |
| 202787 Kestecher | 25 July 2008 | list |
| (202791) 2008 QC_{4} | 24 August 2008 | list |
| (202793) 2008 QG_{13} | 27 August 2008 | list |
| (202794) 2008 QO_{16} | 25 August 2008 | list |
| (202795) 2008 QD_{17} | 27 August 2008 | list |
| (202796) 2008 QQ_{29} | 24 August 2008 | list |

| (202799) 2008 RB_{22} | 3 September 2008 | list |
| (202839) 2008 SX_{218} | 30 September 2008 | list |
| (202844) 2008 TK_{7} | 3 October 2008 | list |
| (202853) 2008 TW_{94} | 5 October 2008 | list |
| (204822) 2007 PZ_{10} | 11 August 2007 | list |
| (204905) 2007 VR_{84} | 7 November 2007 | list |
| (204925) 2008 TG_{5} | 1 October 2008 | list |
| (204956) 2008 WS_{61} | 22 November 2008 | list |
| (204959) 2008 WT_{98} | 23 November 2008 | list |
| (206329) 2003 OB_{6} | 24 July 2003 | list |
| (207753) 2007 SA_{1} | 18 September 2007 | list |
| (207764) 2007 TC_{24} | 10 October 2007 | list |
| (207886) 2007 XT_{9} | 5 December 2007 | list |
| 209255 Myotragus | 28 November 2003 | list |
| (210206) 2007 PL_{39} | 15 August 2007 | list |
| (210272) 2007 TM_{7} | 7 October 2007 | list |
| (210442) 2008 YL_{135} | 30 December 2008 | list |
| (212556) 2006 SV_{49} | 19 September 2006 | list |
| (212557) 2006 SW_{49} | 19 September 2006 | list |
| (212596) 2006 SF_{218} | 27 September 2006 | list |
| (212696) 2007 PH_{39} | 15 August 2007 | list |
| (212704) 2007 RA_{14} | 8 September 2007 | list |
| (212750) 2007 TW_{6} | 6 October 2007 | list |
| 212981 Majalitović | 14 February 2009 | list |
| (212987) 2009 DO_{16} | 17 February 2009 | list |

| (214638) 2006 SY_{19} | 19 September 2006 | list |
| (214956) 2007 XL_{25} | 15 December 2007 | list |
| (214989) 2008 BP_{18} | 30 January 2008 | list |
| (215039) 2009 CM_{53} | 13 February 2009 | list |
| (215047) 2009 DE_{17} | 21 February 2009 | list |
| (215050) 2009 DU_{40} | 16 February 2009 | list |
| (215051) 2009 DL_{41} | 18 February 2009 | list |
| (215056) 2009 DN_{75} | 21 February 2009 | list |
| (215071) 2009 ET_{3} | 15 March 2009 | list |
| (215073) 2009 EC_{20} | 15 March 2009 | list |
| (215076) 2009 FP_{3} | 17 March 2009 | list |
| (215078) 2009 FL_{18} | 19 March 2009 | list |
| (215079) 2009 FO_{18} | 19 March 2009 | list |
| (216258) 2006 WH_{1} | 18 November 2006 | list |
| 216295 Menorca | 11 June 2007 | list |
| 216368 Hypnomys | 14 January 2008 | list |
| (216410) 2008 QG_{18} | 28 August 2008 | list |
| (216422) 2008 TJ_{6} | 3 October 2008 | list |
| (216440) 2009 EU_{4} | 15 March 2009 | list |
| (216441) 2009 EO_{20} | 15 March 2009 | list |
| (216444) 2009 FX_{30} | 19 March 2009 | list |
| (216457) 2009 HG_{57} | 20 April 2009 | list |
| (216795) 2006 SA_{50} | 19 September 2006 | list |
| (216798) 2006 SG_{218} | 27 September 2006 | list |
| (216799) 2006 SM_{218} | 28 September 2006 | list |

| (216859) 2008 AP_{101} | 7 January 2008 | list |
| (216860) 2008 BX_{18} | 29 January 2008 | list |
| (216894) 2009 FK_{2} | 17 March 2009 | list |
| (216901) 2009 HO_{88} | 23 April 2009 | list |
| (216907) 2009 JG | 2 May 2009 | list |
| (216908) 2009 JQ | 3 May 2009 | list |
| (216909) 2009 JB_{1} | 4 May 2009 | list |
| (217560) 2007 OG | 16 July 2007 | list |
| (218915) 2007 PL_{27} | 13 August 2007 | list |
| (218917) 2007 TJ_{68} | 11 October 2007 | list |
| (218932) 2008 CW_{1} | 1 February 2008 | list |
| (219010) 2009 MJ_{8} | 28 June 2009 | list |
| (221881) 2008 HP_{37} | 29 April 2008 | list |
| (221911) 2008 QX_{41} | 27 August 2008 | list |
| (221922) 2009 OJ | 16 July 2009 | list |
| (221925) 2009 ON_{6} | 26 July 2009 | list |
| (221926) 2009 OA_{9} | 28 July 2009 | list |
| (221927) 2009 OQ_{9} | 27 July 2009 | list |
| (221936) 2009 QP_{35} | 29 August 2009 | list |
| (224788) 2006 SB_{50} | 19 September 2006 | list |
| (225146) 2008 GQ_{1} | 2 April 2008 | list |
| (225173) 2008 HW_{3} | 28 April 2008 | list |
| (225228) 2008 TE_{92} | 4 October 2008 | list |
| (225233) 2009 OJ_{3} | 20 July 2009 | list |
| (225243) 2009 QU_{22} | 20 August 2009 | list |

| (225246) 2009 QX_{28} | 23 August 2009 | list |
| (225248) 2009 QJ_{33} | 24 August 2009 | list |
| (225252) 2009 QQ_{47} | 28 August 2009 | list |
| (225253) 2009 RP_{1} | 11 September 2009 | list |
| (228031) 2008 GS_{1} | 4 April 2008 | list |
| (228066) 2008 OM_{2} | 26 July 2008 | list |
| (228068) 2008 OF_{8} | 29 July 2008 | list |
| (228069) 2008 OF_{9} | 29 July 2008 | list |
| (228073) 2008 PT_{6} | 4 August 2008 | list |
| (228074) 2008 PT_{7} | 5 August 2008 | list |
| (228076) 2008 PJ_{15} | 10 August 2008 | list |
| (228079) 2008 QA_{17} | 26 August 2008 | list |
| (228080) 2008 QS_{17} | 27 August 2008 | list |
| (228081) 2008 QS_{28} | 31 August 2008 | list |
| (228087) 2008 RL_{100} | 2 September 2008 | list |
| (228109) 2008 TA_{5} | 1 October 2008 | list |
| (228116) 2008 TK_{82} | 3 October 2008 | list |
| (228117) 2008 TJ_{93} | 5 October 2008 | list |
| (228131) 2009 QE_{1} | 16 August 2009 | list |
| 228133 Ripoll | 20 August 2009 | list |
| (228134) 2009 QG_{43} | 27 August 2009 | list |
| 228147 Miquelbarceló | 21 September 2009 | list |
| 228180 Puertollano | 11 October 2009 | list |
| (228181) 2009 TF_{9} | 12 October 2009 | list |
| (228183) 2009 TQ_{20} | 11 October 2009 | list |

| (228184) 2009 TR_{20} | 11 October 2009 | list |
| (228185) 2009 TD_{27} | 14 October 2009 | list |
| (228186) 2009 TP_{31} | 15 October 2009 | list |
| (228187) 2009 TQ_{35} | 14 October 2009 | list |
| (229783) 2008 PG_{17} | 11 August 2008 | list |
| (229786) 2008 QU_{8} | 25 August 2008 | list |
| (229814) 2008 SQ_{246} | 30 September 2008 | list |
| (229818) 2008 TP_{4} | 1 October 2008 | list |
| (229835) 2009 QA_{31} | 24 August 2009 | list |
| (229858) 2009 TZ_{5} | 11 October 2009 | list |
| (229859) 2009 TD_{6} | 12 October 2009 | list |
| (229861) 2009 TL_{17} | 15 October 2009 | list |
| (229865) 2009 TQ_{26} | 14 October 2009 | list |
| (229866) 2009 TV_{27} | 15 October 2009 | list |
| (229868) 2009 TS_{35} | 14 October 2009 | list |
| (229870) 2009 UD_{12} | 17 October 2009 | list |
| (229878) 2009 UE_{40} | 18 October 2009 | list |
| (229894) 2009 UC_{130} | 29 October 2009 | list |
| (231488) 2008 PO_{6} | 5 August 2008 | list |
| (231489) 2008 PG_{15} | 10 August 2008 | list |
| (231491) 2008 QL_{17} | 27 August 2008 | list |
| (231492) 2008 QD_{18} | 28 August 2008 | list |
| (231494) 2008 QL_{24} | 26 August 2008 | list |
| (231495) 2008 QJ_{27} | 30 August 2008 | list |
| (231496) 2008 QU_{29} | 25 August 2008 | list |

| (231497) 2008 QU_{33} | 27 August 2008 | list |
| (231543) 2008 SR_{218} | 30 September 2008 | list |
| (231544) 2008 SO_{219} | 30 September 2008 | list |
| (231556) 2008 TT_{4} | 1 October 2008 | list |
| (231557) 2008 TQ_{27} | 1 October 2008 | list |
| (231569) 2008 TU_{165} | 6 October 2008 | list |
| (231607) 2009 JQ_{12} | 15 May 2009 | list |
| (231617) 2009 SW_{102} | 24 September 2009 | list |
| (231631) 2009 TV_{41} | 12 October 2009 | list |
| (231659) 2009 WE_{237} | 16 November 2009 | list |
| (231663) 2009 XA_{22} | 9 December 2009 | list |
| (233609) 2007 TV_{6} | 6 October 2007 | list |
| (233643) 2008 MB_{1} | 27 June 2008 | list |
| (233648) 2008 PN_{8} | 6 August 2008 | list |
| (233650) 2008 PM_{15} | 6 August 2008 | list |
| (233655) 2008 QH_{12} | 25 August 2008 | list |
| (233658) 2008 QG_{28} | 30 August 2008 | list |
| (233659) 2008 QM_{28} | 30 August 2008 | list |
| (233679) 2008 RV_{79} | 3 September 2008 | list |
| (233732) 2008 SD_{218} | 29 September 2008 | list |
| (233750) 2008 TM_{4} | 1 October 2008 | list |
| (233751) 2008 TW_{6} | 3 October 2008 | list |
| (233774) 2008 TE_{158} | 5 October 2008 | list |
| (233912) 2009 NC | 3 July 2009 | list |
| (233920) 2009 SD_{161} | 21 September 2009 | list |

| (233922) 2009 TT_{1} | 9 October 2009 | list |
| (233937) 2009 VC_{50} | 11 November 2009 | list |
| (233938) 2009 VM_{57} | 12 November 2009 | list |
| (236764) 2007 OJ_{1} | 19 July 2007 | list |
| (236765) 2007 OA_{2} | 19 July 2007 | list |
| (236809) 2007 RW_{13} | 4 September 2007 | list |
| (236980) 2008 OT_{9} | 31 July 2008 | list |
| (236981) 2008 OG_{12} | 27 July 2008 | list |
| (236982) 2008 OY_{12} | 29 July 2008 | list |
| (236985) 2008 PA_{22} | 4 August 2008 | list |
| (236986) 2008 QU_{9} | 26 August 2008 | list |
| 236987 Deustua | 26 August 2008 | list |
| 236988 Robberto | 25 August 2008 | list |
| (237070) 2008 SM_{246} | 30 September 2008 | list |
| (237071) 2008 SP_{246} | 30 September 2008 | list |
| (237088) 2008 TW_{2} | 4 October 2008 | list |
| (237089) 2008 TB_{6} | 3 October 2008 | list |
| (237103) 2008 TJ_{92} | 4 October 2008 | list |
| (237114) 2008 TY_{157} | 4 October 2008 | list |
| (237229) 2008 VR_{64} | 10 November 2008 | list |
| (237238) 2008 WY_{21} | 18 November 2008 | list |
| (237294) 2008 YE_{5} | 19 December 2008 | list |
| (237295) 2008 YN_{7} | 20 December 2008 | list |
| (237331) 2009 FB_{24} | 19 March 2009 | list |
| (239302) 2007 PO_{40} | 15 August 2007 | list |

| (239526) 2008 RE_{22} | 3 September 2008 | list |
| (239568) 2008 TE_{5} | 1 October 2008 | list |
| (239576) 2008 TS_{93} | 5 October 2008 | list |
| (239581) 2008 TT_{165} | 5 October 2008 | list |
| (239657) 2008 WL_{124} | 24 November 2008 | list |
| (239674) 2008 YD_{23} | 18 December 2008 | list |
| (239740) 2009 EL_{3} | 14 March 2009 | list |
| (239759) 2010 BY_{2} | 21 January 2010 | list |
| (239768) 2010 CS_{42} | 7 February 2010 | list |
| (239775) 2010 CF_{69} | 12 February 2010 | list |
| (241110) 2007 NR_{1} | 12 July 2007 | list |
| (241130) 2007 PG_{39} | 15 August 2007 | list |
| 241362 Nesiotites | 18 December 2007 | list |
| (241445) 2008 YE_{23} | 18 December 2008 | list |
| (241508) 2009 DJ_{16} | 17 February 2009 | list |
| (241511) 2009 DK_{41} | 18 February 2009 | list |
| (241534) 2010 EE_{36} | 11 March 2010 | list |
| (241536) 2010 EX_{39} | 11 March 2010 | list |
| (241540) 2010 EC_{88} | 14 March 2010 | list |
| (241556) 2010 GT_{29} | 8 April 2010 | list |
| (243241) 2007 VX_{189} | 14 November 2007 | list |
| (243279) 2008 CT_{68} | 7 February 2008 | list |
| (243309) 2008 OB_{15} | 28 July 2008 | list |
| (243311) 2008 PN_{13} | 10 August 2008 | list |
| (243425) 2009 CA_{50} | 14 February 2009 | list |

| (243426) 2009 CL_{53} | 13 February 2009 | list |
| (243432) 2009 DO_{41} | 18 February 2009 | list |
| (243441) 2009 FO_{3} | 17 March 2009 | list |
| (243443) 2009 FD_{18} | 18 March 2009 | list |
| (243444) 2009 FQ_{41} | 23 March 2009 | list |
| (243464) 2009 SC_{49} | 17 September 2009 | list |
| (243479) 2009 TY_{5} | 11 October 2009 | list |
| (243481) 2009 TW_{14} | 14 October 2009 | list |
| (243482) 2009 TY_{14} | 12 October 2009 | list |
| (243484) 2009 TA_{23} | 14 October 2009 | list |
| (243486) 2009 TQ_{34} | 12 October 2009 | list |
| (245490) 2005 QR_{31} | 23 August 2005 | list |
| (246133) 2007 NS_{1} | 12 July 2007 | list |
| (246137) 2007 OC | 16 July 2007 | list |
| (246163) 2007 QV_{2} | 19 August 2007 | list |
| (246166) 2007 RQ_{5} | 5 September 2007 | list |
| (246170) 2007 RY_{13} | 6 September 2007 | list |
| (246251) 2007 TU_{6} | 6 October 2007 | list |
| (246252) 2007 TY_{6} | 6 October 2007 | list |
| (246486) 2007 XH_{21} | 14 December 2007 | list |
| (246487) 2007 XR_{24} | 14 December 2007 | list |
| (246537) 2008 PQ_{10} | 7 August 2008 | list |
| (246608) 2008 VF_{64} | 9 November 2008 | list |
| (246639) 2008 YJ_{1} | 20 December 2008 | list |
| (246772) 2009 CU_{50} | 14 February 2009 | list |

| (246773) 2009 CQ_{51} | 14 February 2009 | list |
| (246777) 2009 DG_{16} | 17 February 2009 | list |
| (246778) 2009 DK_{16} | 17 February 2009 | list |
| (246786) 2009 DV_{77} | 24 February 2009 | list |
| (246795) 2009 EX_{4} | 15 March 2009 | list |
| (246807) 2009 FE_{31} | 24 March 2009 | list |
| (246816) 2009 HP_{98} | 23 April 2009 | list |
| (246817) 2009 KH_{1} | 17 May 2009 | list |
| (246818) 2009 KA_{2} | 17 May 2009 | list |
| (246823) 2009 TO_{35} | 14 October 2009 | list |
| (246824) 2009 TR_{41} | 15 October 2009 | list |
| (246827) 2009 TT_{46} | 12 October 2009 | list |
| (246851) 2010 GV_{24} | 7 April 2010 | list |
| (248749) 2006 RU | 2 September 2006 | list |
| (249009) 2007 QB_{2} | 21 August 2007 | list |
| (249080) 2007 VR_{5} | 4 November 2007 | list |
| (249244) 2008 QE_{13} | 27 August 2008 | list |
| (249286) 2008 TB_{5} | 1 October 2008 | list |
| (249339) 2008 VG_{64} | 9 November 2008 | list |
| (249345) 2008 WU_{61} | 22 November 2008 | list |
| (249346) 2008 WV_{61} | 22 November 2008 | list |
| (249425) 2009 ER_{3} | 14 March 2009 | list |
| (249426) 2009 EZ_{3} | 15 March 2009 | list |
| (249436) 2009 FL_{31} | 25 March 2009 | list |
| (249470) 2009 JA_{13} | 2 May 2009 | list |

| (249478) 2009 ON_{3} | 17 July 2009 | list |
| (249479) 2009 TN_{7} | 13 October 2009 | list |
| (249481) 2009 TE_{23} | 14 October 2009 | list |
| (249482) 2009 TZ_{27} | 15 October 2009 | list |
| (249489) 2009 UN_{131} | 19 October 2009 | list |
| (249491) 2009 UH_{149} | 23 October 2009 | list |
| (251092) 2006 SW_{197} | 27 September 2006 | list |
| (251392) 2007 VQ_{267} | 15 November 2007 | list |
| (251398) 2007 XB_{24} | 14 December 2007 | list |
| (251427) 2008 BH_{15} | 28 January 2008 | list |
| (251445) 2008 CK_{68} | 5 February 2008 | list |
| (251487) 2008 EY_{7} | 3 March 2008 | list |
| (251540) 2008 YF_{1} | 19 December 2008 | list |
| (251553) 2009 CC_{50} | 14 February 2009 | list |
| (251557) 2009 DJ_{15} | 16 February 2009 | list |
| (251562) 2009 DQ_{71} | 19 February 2009 | list |
| (251572) 2009 FN_{1} | 16 March 2009 | list |
| (251574) 2009 FN_{18} | 19 March 2009 | list |
| (251575) 2009 FE_{25} | 23 March 2009 | list |
| (251577) 2009 FQ_{44} | 21 March 2009 | list |
| (251604) 2009 HN_{89} | 29 April 2009 | list |
| (251606) 2009 HA_{91} | 21 April 2009 | list |
| (251646) 2010 OZ_{126} | 20 July 2010 | list |
| (255814) 2006 SD_{50} | 19 September 2006 | list |
| (256657) 2007 XO_{20} | 13 December 2007 | list |

| (256658) 2007 XG_{21} | 14 December 2007 | list |
| (256762) 2008 BY_{42} | 28 January 2008 | list |
| (256921) 2008 EV_{7} | 1 March 2008 | list |
| 257084 Joanalcover | 5 April 2008 | list |
| (257140) 2008 HJ_{4} | 28 April 2008 | list |
| (257209) 2008 WW_{91} | 26 November 2008 | list |
| (257239) 2009 ET_{4} | 15 March 2009 | list |
| (257243) 2009 EU_{21} | 14 March 2009 | list |
| (257246) 2009 FA_{4} | 18 March 2009 | list |
| (257247) 2009 FS_{18} | 20 March 2009 | list |
| (257253) 2009 FH_{30} | 27 March 2009 | list |
| (257259) 2009 FU_{45} | 27 March 2009 | list |
| (257292) 2009 HK_{45} | 21 April 2009 | list |
| (257308) 2009 HM_{77} | 22 April 2009 | list |
| (257311) 2009 HM_{88} | 30 April 2009 | list |
| (257312) 2009 HT_{88} | 22 April 2009 | list |
| (257313) 2009 HW_{88} | 23 April 2009 | list |
| (257334) 2009 JM | 2 May 2009 | list |
| (257335) 2009 JZ | 4 May 2009 | list |
| 257336 Noeliasanchez | 4 May 2009 | list |
| (257339) 2009 JZ_{12} | 2 May 2009 | list |
| (257340) 2009 JC_{13} | 2 May 2009 | list |
| (257345) 2009 KR_{1} | 17 May 2009 | list |
| (257348) 2009 KN_{7} | 26 May 2009 | list |
| (257349) 2009 KD_{8} | 28 May 2009 | list |

| (257350) 2009 KF_{8} | 28 May 2009 | list |
| (257358) 2009 LT | 11 June 2009 | list |
| (257360) 2009 MA_{1} | 17 June 2009 | list |
| (257361) 2009 ME_{7} | 24 June 2009 | list |
| (257362) 2009 MR_{8} | 27 June 2009 | list |
| (257364) 2009 OH | 16 July 2009 | list |
| (257365) 2009 OZ | 19 July 2009 | list |
| 257371 Miguelbello | 14 August 2009 | list |
| (257375) 2009 QZ_{47} | 28 August 2009 | list |
| (257442) 2010 RH_{71} | 9 September 2010 | list |
| (262609) 2006 VD_{141} | 13 November 2006 | list |
| (263074) 2007 NA_{2} | 13 July 2007 | list |
| (263075) 2007 OW_{6} | 22 July 2007 | list |
| (263128) 2007 VB_{84} | 7 November 2007 | list |
| (263612) 2008 GJ_{1} | 3 April 2008 | list |
| (263694) 2008 HN_{4} | 29 April 2008 | list |
| (263714) 2008 HR_{37} | 30 April 2008 | list |
| (263792) 2008 QX_{5} | 25 August 2008 | list |
| (263864) 2009 DD_{16} | 17 February 2009 | list |
| (263869) 2009 DY_{41} | 19 February 2009 | list |
| (263887) 2009 FU | 16 March 2009 | list |
| (263888) 2009 FT_{1} | 17 March 2009 | list |
| (263893) 2009 FD_{14} | 18 March 2009 | list |
| (263894) 2009 FF_{17} | 16 March 2009 | list |
| (263895) 2009 FK_{18} | 19 March 2009 | list |

| (263896) 2009 FU_{18} | 20 March 2009 | list |
| (263900) 2009 FY_{23} | 16 March 2009 | list |
| (263901) 2009 FF_{25} | 23 March 2009 | list |
| (263928) 2009 HP_{36} | 20 April 2009 | list |
| (263933) 2009 HM_{45} | 21 April 2009 | list |
| (263947) 2009 HL_{88} | 24 April 2009 | list |
| (263948) 2009 HV_{88} | 23 April 2009 | list |
| (263949) 2009 HQ_{89} | 30 April 2009 | list |
| (263959) 2009 JJ | 2 May 2009 | list |
| (263960) 2009 JO | 3 May 2009 | list |
| (263969) 2009 JD_{13} | 2 May 2009 | list |
| (263973) 2009 KL_{1} | 18 May 2009 | list |
| (263974) 2009 KG_{2} | 19 May 2009 | list |
| (263976) 2009 KD_{5} | 26 May 2009 | list |
| (263977) 2009 KH_{7} | 26 May 2009 | list |
| (263978) 2009 KY_{7} | 18 May 2009 | list |
| (263979) 2009 KE_{8} | 28 May 2009 | list |
| (263993) 2009 MT_{8} | 27 June 2009 | list |
| (263996) 2009 NW | 15 July 2009 | list |
| (263997) 2009 OK_{2} | 18 July 2009 | list |
| (263998) 2009 OZ_{3} | 17 July 2009 | list |
| (263999) 2009 OL_{4} | 19 July 2009 | list |
| (264000) 2009 OB_{6} | 19 July 2009 | list |
| (264002) 2009 OU_{8} | 27 July 2009 | list |
| (264003) 2009 OC_{9} | 28 July 2009 | list |

| (264011) 2009 PP_{2} | 13 August 2009 | list |
| (264012) 2009 PJ_{5} | 15 August 2009 | list |
| (264016) 2009 PU_{9} | 14 August 2009 | list |
| (264029) 2009 QB_{22} | 20 August 2009 | list |
| (264030) 2009 QX_{25} | 18 August 2009 | list |
| (264031) 2009 QV_{30} | 23 August 2009 | list |
| (264032) 2009 QX_{31} | 23 August 2009 | list |
| (264037) 2009 QO_{52} | 19 August 2009 | list |
| (264041) 2009 RB_{3} | 10 September 2009 | list |
| (264109) 2009 SK_{339} | 22 September 2009 | list |
| (264122) 2009 TD_{22} | 12 October 2009 | list |
| (264125) 2009 TE_{35} | 14 October 2009 | list |
| (264127) 2009 TN_{39} | 12 October 2009 | list |
| (264132) 2009 UC_{5} | 17 October 2009 | list |
| (264144) 2009 UJ_{91} | 18 October 2009 | list |
| (264151) 2009 VE_{76} | 14 November 2009 | list |
| (266092) 2006 SM_{53} | 19 September 2006 | list |
| 266465 Andalucia | 16 July 2007 | list |
| (266471) 2007 YB_{1} | 16 December 2007 | list |
| (266609) 2008 MR | 26 June 2008 | list |
| (266611) 2008 OK_{9} | 29 July 2008 | list |
| (266612) 2008 OQ_{9} | 29 July 2008 | list |
| (266615) 2008 OD_{12} | 25 July 2008 | list |
| (266619) 2008 PC_{6} | 4 August 2008 | list |
| (266624) 2008 QH_{8} | 25 August 2008 | list |

| (266625) 2008 QL_{10} | 26 August 2008 | list |
| (266627) 2008 QL_{26} | 29 August 2008 | list |
| (266651) 2008 TY_{4} | 1 October 2008 | list |
| (266681) 2009 OO_{2} | 17 July 2009 | list |
| (266686) 2009 OM_{20} | 29 July 2009 | list |
| (266687) 2009 OL_{21} | 26 July 2009 | list |
| (266704) 2009 QW_{19} | 19 August 2009 | list |
| (266705) 2009 QZ_{21} | 20 August 2009 | list |
| (266708) 2009 QE_{31} | 24 August 2009 | list |
| (266712) 2009 QA_{47} | 28 August 2009 | list |
| (266713) 2009 QL_{47} | 28 August 2009 | list |
| (266714) 2009 QT_{47} | 28 August 2009 | list |
| (266715) 2009 QT_{51} | 29 August 2009 | list |
| (266720) 2009 RJ | 9 September 2009 | list |
| (266770) 2009 SE_{165} | 22 September 2009 | list |
| (266816) 2009 TO_{6} | 12 October 2009 | list |
| (266818) 2009 TD_{11} | 12 October 2009 | list |
| (266820) 2009 TQ_{21} | 12 October 2009 | list |
| (266821) 2009 TK_{22} | 13 October 2009 | list |
| (266823) 2009 TJ_{26} | 14 October 2009 | list |
| (266824) 2009 TX_{27} | 15 October 2009 | list |
| (266825) 2009 TP_{34} | 12 October 2009 | list |
| (266828) 2009 TP_{37} | 8 October 2009 | list |
| (266861) 2009 UO_{112} | 25 October 2009 | list |
| (266892) 2009 WL_{50} | 19 November 2009 | list |

| (266894) 2009 WR_{81} | 18 November 2009 | list |
| (266895) 2009 WS_{81} | 18 November 2009 | list |
| (266897) 2009 WK_{104} | 18 November 2009 | list |
| (268752) 2006 QX_{110} | 30 August 2006 | list |
| (268814) 2006 VV_{45} | 14 November 2006 | list |
| (269197) 2008 HN_{2} | 25 April 2008 | list |
| (269229) 2008 PD_{17} | 11 August 2008 | list |
| (269236) 2008 QL_{8} | 25 August 2008 | list |
| (269237) 2008 QC_{9} | 25 August 2008 | list |
| (269238) 2008 QM_{9} | 25 August 2008 | list |
| (269239) 2008 QD_{10} | 26 August 2008 | list |
| (269240) 2008 QM_{10} | 26 August 2008 | list |
| (269241) 2008 QY_{10} | 26 August 2008 | list |
| (269242) 2008 QO_{13} | 27 August 2008 | list |
| (269244) 2008 QJ_{17} | 27 August 2008 | list |
| (269250) 2008 QR_{26} | 29 August 2008 | list |
| (269263) 2008 RS_{47} | 2 September 2008 | list |
| (269269) 2008 RN_{70} | 6 September 2008 | list |
| (269324) 2008 SL_{219} | 30 September 2008 | list |
| (269332) 2008 TK_{6} | 3 October 2008 | list |
| (269336) 2008 TS_{27} | 1 October 2008 | list |
| (269342) 2008 TU_{91} | 4 October 2008 | list |
| (269343) 2008 TZ_{94} | 6 October 2008 | list |
| (269377) 2009 NB_{1} | 14 July 2009 | list |
| (269380) 2009 PM_{10} | 15 August 2009 | list |

| (269383) 2009 QG_{1} | 16 August 2009 | list |
| (269387) 2009 QT_{22} | 20 August 2009 | list |
| (269388) 2009 QX_{22} | 20 August 2009 | list |
| (269395) 2009 QX_{50} | 26 August 2009 | list |
| (269397) 2009 RB | 2 September 2009 | list |
| (269398) 2009 RE_{3} | 10 September 2009 | list |
| (269469) 2009 TB_{18} | 15 October 2009 | list |
| (269471) 2009 TP_{21} | 12 October 2009 | list |
| (269474) 2009 TG_{27} | 14 October 2009 | list |
| (269476) 2009 TR_{34} | 12 October 2009 | list |
| (269477) 2009 TM_{35} | 14 October 2009 | list |
| (269478) 2009 TP_{35} | 14 October 2009 | list |
| (269486) 2009 UW_{15} | 17 October 2009 | list |
| (269490) 2009 UH_{23} | 18 October 2009 | list |
| (269506) 2009 UY_{89} | 17 October 2009 | list |
| (269516) 2009 UN_{127} | 26 October 2009 | list |
| (269517) 2009 UD_{129} | 28 October 2009 | list |
| (269539) 2009 VD_{92} | 12 November 2009 | list |
| (269547) 2009 VG_{111} | 11 November 2009 | list |
| (269553) 2009 WX_{15} | 16 November 2009 | list |
| (269560) 2009 WQ_{50} | 19 November 2009 | list |
| (269591) 2009 XO_{7} | 12 December 2009 | list |
| (269618) 2010 KU_{117} | 18 May 2010 | list |
| (273376) 2006 UQ_{288} | 29 October 2006 | list |
| (273796) 2007 FM_{18} | 19 March 2007 | list |

| (273978) 2007 LJ_{15} | 11 June 2007 | list |
| (273998) 2007 OF_{4} | 19 July 2007 | list |
| (274191) 2008 HU_{3} | 28 April 2008 | list |
| (274240) 2008 NS_{2} | 10 July 2008 | list |
| (274242) 2008 OW | 26 July 2008 | list |
| (274247) 2008 OJ_{11} | 31 July 2008 | list |
| (274249) 2008 OU_{13} | 29 July 2008 | list |
| (274263) 2008 PJ_{5} | 5 August 2008 | list |
| (274265) 2008 PJ_{7} | 5 August 2008 | list |
| (274266) 2008 PB_{8} | 5 August 2008 | list |
| (274267) 2008 PG_{8} | 6 August 2008 | list |
| (274273) 2008 PQ_{12} | 9 August 2008 | list |
| (274274) 2008 PB_{13} | 10 August 2008 | list |
| (274275) 2008 PG_{14} | 10 August 2008 | list |
| (274281) 2008 QK_{2} | 24 August 2008 | list |
| (274285) 2008 QJ_{8} | 25 August 2008 | list |
| (274286) 2008 QB_{9} | 25 August 2008 | list |
| (274287) 2008 QO_{9} | 25 August 2008 | list |
| (274288) 2008 QC_{10} | 26 August 2008 | list |
| (274289) 2008 QV_{12} | 26 August 2008 | list |
| (274292) 2008 QQ_{16} | 26 August 2008 | list |
| (274293) 2008 QU_{16} | 26 August 2008 | list |
| (274303) 2008 QW_{25} | 24 August 2008 | list |
| (274304) 2008 QW_{33} | 27 August 2008 | list |
| (274305) 2008 QE_{34} | 29 August 2008 | list |

| (274311) 2008 QX_{39} | 25 August 2008 | list |
| (274354) 2008 RN_{47} | 2 September 2008 | list |
| (274531) 2008 SJ_{219} | 30 September 2008 | list |
| (274532) 2008 SD_{220} | 30 September 2008 | list |
| (274541) 2008 SL_{246} | 30 September 2008 | list |
| (274542) 2008 SN_{246} | 30 September 2008 | list |
| (274581) 2008 TZ_{4} | 1 October 2008 | list |
| (274582) 2008 TC_{6} | 3 October 2008 | list |
| (274583) 2008 TF_{7} | 3 October 2008 | list |
| (274584) 2008 TN_{7} | 3 October 2008 | list |
| (274585) 2008 TQ_{7} | 3 October 2008 | list |
| (274586) 2008 TW_{7} | 4 October 2008 | list |
| (274587) 2008 TC_{8} | 4 October 2008 | list |
| (274592) 2008 TR_{27} | 1 October 2008 | list |
| (274628) 2008 TP_{82} | 3 October 2008 | list |
| (274635) 2008 TU_{93} | 5 October 2008 | list |
| (274817) 2009 NC_{1} | 15 July 2009 | list |
| (274820) 2009 OQ_{2} | 19 July 2009 | list |
| (274832) 2009 QN_{1} | 16 August 2009 | list |
| (274838) 2009 QL_{21} | 19 August 2009 | list |
| (274839) 2009 QD_{22} | 20 August 2009 | list |
| (274840) 2009 QO_{23} | 16 August 2009 | list |
| (274841) 2009 QQ_{23} | 16 August 2009 | list |
| (274849) 2009 QO_{41} | 20 August 2009 | list |
| (274850) 2009 QF_{48} | 28 August 2009 | list |

| (274853) 2009 QH_{62} | 29 August 2009 | list |
| (274923) 2009 SC_{161} | 21 September 2009 | list |
| (274982) 2009 TO_{3} | 11 October 2009 | list |
| (274984) 2009 TD_{5} | 11 October 2009 | list |
| (274985) 2009 TW_{5} | 11 October 2009 | list |
| (274986) 2009 TY_{6} | 12 October 2009 | list |
| (274987) 2009 TB_{7} | 12 October 2009 | list |
| (274988) 2009 TG_{9} | 13 October 2009 | list |
| (274990) 2009 TO_{14} | 12 October 2009 | list |
| (274991) 2009 TQ_{14} | 12 October 2009 | list |
| (274993) 2009 TB_{17} | 14 October 2009 | list |
| (274994) 2009 TM_{21} | 12 October 2009 | list |
| (274995) 2009 TB_{23} | 14 October 2009 | list |
| (274996) 2009 TC_{23} | 14 October 2009 | list |
| (274999) 2009 TE_{27} | 14 October 2009 | list |
| (275002) 2009 TK_{34} | 11 October 2009 | list |
| (275006) 2009 TM_{39} | 15 October 2009 | list |
| (275016) 2009 UV_{15} | 17 October 2009 | list |
| (275066) 2009 UZ_{129} | 27 October 2009 | list |
| (275077) 2009 UM_{145} | 17 October 2009 | list |
| (275116) 2009 VD_{57} | 11 November 2009 | list |
| (275117) 2009 VE_{57} | 11 November 2009 | list |
| (275118) 2009 VV_{57} | 12 November 2009 | list |
| (275139) 2009 VL_{75} | 12 November 2009 | list |
| (275140) 2009 VN_{75} | 13 November 2009 | list |

| (275158) 2009 VD_{111} | 10 November 2009 | list |
| (275159) 2009 VM_{111} | 12 November 2009 | list |
| (275216) 2009 WA_{185} | 24 November 2009 | list |
| (275219) 2009 WG_{195} | 25 November 2009 | list |
| (275241) 2009 XZ_{2} | 8 December 2009 | list |
| (275243) 2009 XW_{3} | 9 December 2009 | list |
| (275248) 2009 XM_{11} | 10 December 2009 | list |
| (275252) 2009 XM_{20} | 9 December 2009 | list |
| (275253) 2009 XC_{22} | 9 December 2009 | list |
| (278387) 2007 OM | 17 July 2007 | list |
| (278397) 2007 QZ_{1} | 18 August 2007 | list |
| (278450) 2007 TR_{6} | 6 October 2007 | list |
| (278502) 2008 AP_{1} | 6 January 2008 | list |
| (278576) 2008 HS_{37} | 30 April 2008 | list |
| (278590) 2008 NA_{2} | 4 July 2008 | list |
| (278593) 2008 OC | 24 July 2008 | list |
| (278594) 2008 OT_{1} | 26 July 2008 | list |
| (278596) 2008 OR_{2} | 27 July 2008 | list |
| (278602) 2008 PG_{6} | 4 August 2008 | list |
| (278603) 2008 PQ_{6} | 4 August 2008 | list |
| (278605) 2008 PZ_{7} | 5 August 2008 | list |
| (278613) 2008 QV_{5} | 24 August 2008 | list |
| (278614) 2008 QC_{8} | 25 August 2008 | list |
| (278615) 2008 QP_{8} | 25 August 2008 | list |
| (278616) 2008 QQ_{9} | 25 August 2008 | list |

| (278617) 2008 QV_{10} | 26 August 2008 | list |
| (278618) 2008 QN_{12} | 26 August 2008 | list |
| (278623) 2008 QP_{28} | 31 August 2008 | list |
| (278692) 2008 RS_{120} | 5 September 2008 | list |
| (278696) 2008 RX_{131} | 4 September 2008 | list |
| (278797) 2008 SS_{218} | 30 September 2008 | list |
| (278809) 2008 SS_{246} | 30 September 2008 | list |
| (278849) 2008 TU_{5} | 2 October 2008 | list |
| (278850) 2008 TU_{7} | 4 October 2008 | list |
| (278858) 2008 TW_{27} | 1 October 2008 | list |
| (278885) 2008 TF_{82} | 2 October 2008 | list |
| (279051) 2008 VE_{64} | 9 November 2008 | list |
| (279061) 2008 WJ_{10} | 18 November 2008 | list |
| (279063) 2008 WW_{21} | 18 November 2008 | list |
| (279064) 2008 WX_{21} | 18 November 2008 | list |
| (279082) 2008 WC_{101} | 25 November 2008 | list |
| (279083) 2008 WW_{102} | 25 November 2008 | list |
| (279085) 2008 WW_{105} | 28 November 2008 | list |
| (279092) 2008 WW_{132} | 26 November 2008 | list |
| (279116) 2009 JK | 2 May 2009 | list |
| (279121) 2009 OP_{22} | 27 July 2009 | list |
| (279124) 2009 PV_{4} | 15 August 2009 | list |
| (279126) 2009 PU_{16} | 15 August 2009 | list |
| (279127) 2009 QT_{11} | 16 August 2009 | list |
| (279129) 2009 QU_{29} | 21 August 2009 | list |

| (279132) 2009 QE_{45} | 27 August 2009 | list |
| (279138) 2009 RU_{28} | 13 September 2009 | list |
| (279151) 2009 SD_{49} | 17 September 2009 | list |
| (279189) 2009 SG_{359} | 22 September 2009 | list |
| (279193) 2009 TE_{3} | 10 October 2009 | list |
| (279194) 2009 TF_{3} | 10 October 2009 | list |
| (279196) 2009 TG_{5} | 11 October 2009 | list |
| (279198) 2009 TJ_{17} | 15 October 2009 | list |
| (279200) 2009 TU_{27} | 15 October 2009 | list |
| (279288) 2009 WU_{81} | 18 November 2009 | list |
| (279291) 2009 WO_{104} | 20 November 2009 | list |
| (279379) 2010 CU_{4} | 7 February 2010 | list |
| (279407) 2010 EA_{105} | 14 March 2010 | list |
| (279449) 2010 RW_{69} | 7 September 2010 | list |
| (279451) 2010 RC_{76} | 11 September 2010 | list |
| (279452) 2010 RV_{77} | 6 September 2010 | list |
| (281237) 2007 JE_{42} | 15 May 2007 | list |
| (281253) 2007 OV_{6} | 20 July 2007 | list |
| (281267) 2007 QY_{2} | 19 August 2007 | list |
| (281351) 2007 VT_{10} | 5 November 2007 | list |
| (281378) 2008 OE_{8} | 29 July 2008 | list |
| (281384) 2008 PE_{6} | 4 August 2008 | list |
| (281385) 2008 PF_{8} | 6 August 2008 | list |
| (281388) 2008 QZ_{1} | 24 August 2008 | list |
| (281390) 2008 QE_{9} | 25 August 2008 | list |

| (281392) 2008 QG_{27} | 30 August 2008 | list |
| (281397) 2008 RJ_{22} | 3 September 2008 | list |
| (281476) 2008 SZ_{219} | 30 September 2008 | list |
| (281523) 2008 TQ_{82} | 3 October 2008 | list |
| (281537) 2008 TS_{177} | 4 October 2008 | list |
| (281708) 2008 WU_{98} | 23 November 2008 | list |
| (281709) 2008 WF_{103} | 27 November 2008 | list |
| (281734) 2008 YG_{1} | 19 December 2008 | list |
| (281785) 2009 TO_{36} | 14 October 2009 | list |
| (281791) 2009 UD_{94} | 28 October 2009 | list |
| (281798) 2009 VP_{39} | 10 November 2009 | list |
| (282952) 2007 RV_{187} | 13 September 2007 | list |
| (282972) 2007 TE_{4} | 6 October 2007 | list |
| (282974) 2007 TQ_{14} | 7 October 2007 | list |
| (282975) 2007 TS_{14} | 8 October 2007 | list |
| (283056) 2008 OH | 25 July 2008 | list |
| (283062) 2008 QB_{13} | 27 August 2008 | list |
| (283063) 2008 QH_{13} | 27 August 2008 | list |
| (283088) 2008 TX_{94} | 5 October 2008 | list |
| (283157) 2009 BL_{60} | 17 January 2009 | list |
| (283166) 2009 DZ_{15} | 16 February 2009 | list |
| (283170) 2009 ER_{4} | 15 March 2009 | list |
| (283176) 2009 QF_{59} | 29 August 2009 | list |
| (283221) 2010 PR_{26} | 3 August 2010 | list |
| (284490) 2007 NZ | 11 July 2007 | list |

| (284491) 2007 NQ_{2} | 13 July 2007 | list |
| (284655) 2007 YU_{47} | 30 December 2007 | list |
| (284669) 2008 OQ_{24} | 31 July 2008 | list |
| (284672) 2008 QA_{44} | 27 August 2008 | list |
| (284758) 2008 VN_{64} | 10 November 2008 | list |
| (284875) 2009 DG_{41} | 18 February 2009 | list |
| (284876) 2009 DK_{42} | 18 February 2009 | list |
| (284881) 2009 EA_{21} | 15 March 2009 | list |
| (284898) 2009 TC_{5} | 10 October 2009 | list |
| (284905) 2009 VZ_{93} | 12 November 2009 | list |
| (284929) 2010 CA_{180} | 7 February 2010 | list |
| (284944) 2010 EQ_{34} | 9 March 2010 | list |
| (292181) 2006 SZ_{19} | 19 September 2006 | list |
| (293633) 2007 OT_{3} | 20 July 2007 | list |
| (293696) 2007 PF_{39} | 15 August 2007 | list |
| (293699) 2007 PN_{42} | 14 August 2007 | list |
| (293722) 2007 RN_{5} | 3 September 2007 | list |
| (293933) 2007 TX_{6} | 6 October 2007 | list |
| (294297) 2007 VM_{4} | 3 November 2007 | list |
| (294336) 2007 VZ_{83} | 5 November 2007 | list |
| (294339) 2007 VW_{84} | 8 November 2007 | list |
| (294346) 2007 VB_{91} | 7 November 2007 | list |
| (294401) 2007 VJ_{188} | 11 November 2007 | list |
| (294403) 2007 VW_{189} | 14 November 2007 | list |
| (294429) 2007 VH_{244} | 15 November 2007 | list |

| (294517) 2007 XV_{15} | 8 December 2007 | list |
| (294522) 2007 XK_{25} | 15 December 2007 | list |
| (294707) 2008 BU_{16} | 29 January 2008 | list |
| (294708) 2008 BZ_{18} | 29 January 2008 | list |
| (294725) 2008 BV_{40} | 30 January 2008 | list |
| (294726) 2008 BX_{40} | 29 January 2008 | list |
| (294901) 2008 DJ_{23} | 29 February 2008 | list |
| (295221) 2008 GM | 2 April 2008 | list |
| (295222) 2008 GH_{1} | 2 April 2008 | list |
| (295330) 2008 HM_{2} | 25 April 2008 | list |
| (295331) 2008 HL_{3} | 28 April 2008 | list |
| (295332) 2008 HL_{4} | 29 April 2008 | list |
| (295446) 2008 OB_{3} | 28 July 2008 | list |
| (295454) 2008 PW_{1} | 2 August 2008 | list |
| (295456) 2008 PB_{4} | 5 August 2008 | list |
| (295457) 2008 PC_{4} | 5 August 2008 | list |
| (295458) 2008 PA_{5} | 4 August 2008 | list |
| (295459) 2008 PD_{10} | 5 August 2008 | list |
| (295460) 2008 PO_{11} | 9 August 2008 | list |
| (295461) 2008 PU_{12} | 9 August 2008 | list |
| (295464) 2008 QN_{1} | 23 August 2008 | list |
| (295465) 2008 QQ_{1} | 23 August 2008 | list |
| (295466) 2008 QE_{2} | 24 August 2008 | list |
| (295470) 2008 QG_{11} | 26 August 2008 | list |
| (295477) 2008 QE_{26} | 29 August 2008 | list |

| (295478) 2008 QC_{27} | 30 August 2008 | list |
| (295619) 2008 SJ_{218} | 30 September 2008 | list |
| (295653) 2008 TX_{4} | 1 October 2008 | list |
| (295654) 2008 TQ_{6} | 3 October 2008 | list |
| (295655) 2008 TJ_{7} | 3 October 2008 | list |
| (295656) 2008 TV_{7} | 4 October 2008 | list |
| (295672) 2008 TO_{82} | 3 October 2008 | list |
| (295675) 2008 TF_{91} | 3 October 2008 | list |
| (295676) 2008 TQ_{92} | 4 October 2008 | list |
| (295677) 2008 TH_{94} | 5 October 2008 | list |
| (295678) 2008 TV_{94} | 5 October 2008 | list |
| (295884) 2008 WE_{62} | 23 November 2008 | list |
| (295905) 2008 WB_{93} | 26 November 2008 | list |
| (295966) 2008 YV_{23} | 21 December 2008 | list |
| (295968) 2008 YO_{25} | 24 December 2008 | list |
| (296016) 2008 YM_{135} | 30 December 2008 | list |
| (296233) 2009 CQ_{50} | 14 February 2009 | list |
| (296234) 2009 CD_{51} | 14 February 2009 | list |
| (296235) 2009 CK_{51} | 14 February 2009 | list |
| (296240) 2009 CE_{60} | 14 February 2009 | list |
| (296267) 2009 DY_{40} | 16 February 2009 | list |
| (296268) 2009 DA_{41} | 17 February 2009 | list |
| (296269) 2009 DZ_{41} | 19 February 2009 | list |
| (296289) 2009 DY_{77} | 24 February 2009 | list |
| (296298) 2009 DQ_{107} | 23 February 2009 | list |

| (296330) 2009 EF_{20} | 15 March 2009 | list |
| (296343) 2009 FX_{3} | 18 March 2009 | list |
| (296344) 2009 FJ_{4} | 18 March 2009 | list |
| (296358) 2009 FD_{25} | 22 March 2009 | list |
| (296360) 2009 FM_{25} | 20 March 2009 | list |
| (296367) 2009 FF_{31} | 24 March 2009 | list |
| (296405) 2009 GE_{2} | 5 April 2009 | list |
| (296426) 2009 HQ_{36} | 20 April 2009 | list |
| (296433) 2009 HG_{45} | 21 April 2009 | list |
| (296445) 2009 HQ_{57} | 20 April 2009 | list |
| (296447) 2009 HG_{58} | 21 April 2009 | list |
| (296449) 2009 HM_{59} | 23 April 2009 | list |
| (296465) 2009 HK_{88} | 24 April 2009 | list |
| (296466) 2009 HU_{88} | 23 April 2009 | list |
| (296467) 2009 HO_{89} | 30 April 2009 | list |
| (296469) 2009 HB_{91} | 22 April 2009 | list |
| (296488) 2009 JX | 3 May 2009 | list |
| (296489) 2009 JY | 4 May 2009 | list |
| (296490) 2009 JD_{1} | 4 May 2009 | list |
| (296491) 2009 JH_{1} | 2 May 2009 | list |
| (296508) 2009 KA_{8} | 27 May 2009 | list |
| (296522) 2009 OB | 16 July 2009 | list |
| (296523) 2009 OT | 18 July 2009 | list |
| (296528) 2009 OM_{8} | 19 July 2009 | list |
| (296529) 2009 OL_{9} | 28 July 2009 | list |

| (296531) 2009 OF_{10} | 29 July 2009 | list |
| (296538) 2009 OF_{20} | 29 July 2009 | list |
| (296539) 2009 OM_{22} | 25 July 2009 | list |
| (296545) 2009 PH_{5} | 15 August 2009 | list |
| (296553) 2009 QQ_{11} | 16 August 2009 | list |
| (296555) 2009 QZ_{16} | 17 August 2009 | list |
| (296561) 2009 QZ_{30} | 24 August 2009 | list |
| (296565) 2009 QP_{40} | 26 August 2009 | list |
| (296566) 2009 QB_{43} | 26 August 2009 | list |
| (296567) 2009 QJ_{43} | 27 August 2009 | list |
| (296572) 2009 QD_{55} | 27 August 2009 | list |
| (296580) 2009 RT_{7} | 11 September 2009 | list |
| (296733) 2009 TT_{14} | 13 October 2009 | list |
| (296734) 2009 TH_{16} | 10 October 2009 | list |
| (296736) 2009 TH_{20} | 11 October 2009 | list |
| (296737) 2009 TS_{20} | 11 October 2009 | list |
| (296741) 2009 TO_{34} | 12 October 2009 | list |
| (296742) 2009 TR_{35} | 14 October 2009 | list |
| (296743) 2009 TQ_{41} | 14 October 2009 | list |
| (296745) 2009 TL_{46} | 14 October 2009 | list |
| (296775) 2009 UW_{121} | 25 October 2009 | list |
| (296808) 2009 VO_{75} | 13 November 2009 | list |
| (296813) 2009 VL_{111} | 12 November 2009 | list |
| (296852) 2009 WV_{184} | 23 November 2009 | list |
| (296956) 2010 ES_{34} | 9 March 2010 | list |

| (296957) 2010 EJ_{35} | 10 March 2010 | list |
| (296962) 2010 EF_{66} | 10 March 2010 | list |
| (297084) 2010 KL_{36} | 18 May 2010 | list |
| (297089) 2010 KJ_{117} | 17 May 2010 | list |
| (297112) 2010 PS_{74} | 11 August 2010 | list |
| (300285) 2007 OU_{3} | 20 July 2007 | list |
| (300669) 2007 VM_{5} | 3 November 2007 | list |
| (300745) 2007 VU_{189} | 13 November 2007 | list |
| (300765) 2007 VL_{244} | 15 November 2007 | list |
| (300821) 2007 WH_{55} | 30 November 2007 | list |
| (300829) 2007 XQ_{20} | 12 December 2007 | list |
| (300893) 2008 BY_{16} | 28 January 2008 | list |
| (300897) 2008 BQ_{24} | 30 January 2008 | list |
| (300905) 2008 BZ_{40} | 31 January 2008 | list |
| 300933 Teresamarion | 8 February 2008 | list |
| (301015) 2008 PW_{16} | 12 August 2008 | list |
| (301151) 2008 YG_{7} | 19 December 2008 | list |
| (301159) 2008 YJ_{23} | 20 December 2008 | list |
| (301368) 2009 CX_{49} | 14 February 2009 | list |
| (301369) 2009 CF_{51} | 14 February 2009 | list |
| (301407) 2009 DD_{41} | 17 February 2009 | list |
| (301408) 2009 DU_{41} | 19 February 2009 | list |
| (301409) 2009 DB_{42} | 19 February 2009 | list |
| (301410) 2009 DC_{42} | 19 February 2009 | list |
| (301438) 2009 DF_{77} | 21 February 2009 | list |

| (301491) 2009 EP_{3} | 14 March 2009 | list |
| (301492) 2009 EH_{4} | 15 March 2009 | list |
| (301493) 2009 ES_{4} | 15 March 2009 | list |
| (301499) 2009 EX_{21} | 14 March 2009 | list |
| (301507) 2009 EX_{28} | 15 March 2009 | list |
| (301518) 2009 FC_{18} | 18 March 2009 | list |
| (301519) 2009 FF_{18} | 19 March 2009 | list |
| (301523) 2009 FZ_{23} | 18 March 2009 | list |
| (301530) 2009 FW_{38} | 18 March 2009 | list |
| (301533) 2009 FY_{40} | 20 March 2009 | list |
| (301551) 2009 GD_{2} | 5 April 2009 | list |
| (301567) 2009 HT_{36} | 20 April 2009 | list |
| (301634) 2010 ES_{39} | 10 March 2010 | list |
| (301698) 2010 GY_{24} | 8 April 2010 | list |
| (301704) 2010 GW_{28} | 8 April 2010 | list |
| (301734) 2010 GL_{141} | 8 April 2010 | list |
| (304284) 2006 SB_{53} | 20 September 2006 | list |
| (304641) 2006 WY_{1} | 18 November 2006 | list |
| 304788 Cresques | 13 July 2007 | list |
| (304792) 2007 OD | 16 July 2007 | list |
| (305202) 2007 WC_{4} | 17 November 2007 | list |
| (305230) 2007 XP_{18} | 12 December 2007 | list |
| (305231) 2007 XR_{18} | 13 December 2007 | list |
| (305234) 2007 XA_{20} | 12 December 2007 | list |
| (305236) 2007 XY_{24} | 14 December 2007 | list |

| (305355) 2008 BU_{18} | 29 January 2008 | list |
| (305602) 2008 YN_{135} | 30 December 2008 | list |
| (305757) 2009 DR_{15} | 16 February 2009 | list |
| (305758) 2009 DW_{15} | 16 February 2009 | list |
| (305759) 2009 DC_{16} | 17 February 2009 | list |
| (305760) 2009 DD_{17} | 21 February 2009 | list |
| (305764) 2009 DE_{31} | 22 February 2009 | list |
| (305770) 2009 DZ_{40} | 16 February 2009 | list |
| (305771) 2009 DS_{41} | 18 February 2009 | list |
| (305772) 2009 DF_{42} | 22 February 2009 | list |
| (305773) 2009 DQ_{42} | 18 February 2009 | list |
| (305789) 2009 DK_{71} | 18 February 2009 | list |
| (305846) 2009 EW_{3} | 15 March 2009 | list |
| (305847) 2009 EJ_{4} | 15 March 2009 | list |
| (305848) 2009 EM_{4} | 15 March 2009 | list |
| (305849) 2009 EW_{4} | 15 March 2009 | list |
| (305860) 2009 EB_{20} | 15 March 2009 | list |
| (305883) 2009 FJ_{17} | 16 March 2009 | list |
| (305884) 2009 FM_{17} | 17 March 2009 | list |
| (305885) 2009 FV_{17} | 18 March 2009 | list |
| (305886) 2009 FQ_{18} | 19 March 2009 | list |
| (305892) 2009 FO_{24} | 20 March 2009 | list |
| (305893) 2009 FR_{24} | 21 March 2009 | list |
| (305898) 2009 FG_{31} | 24 March 2009 | list |
| (305903) 2009 FQ_{38} | 16 March 2009 | list |

| (305936) 2009 GF_{3} | 13 April 2009 | list |
| (305958) 2009 HE_{45} | 21 April 2009 | list |
| (305959) 2009 HH_{45} | 21 April 2009 | list |
| (305960) 2009 HT_{45} | 21 April 2009 | list |
| (305965) 2009 HJ_{57} | 22 April 2009 | list |
| (305992) 2009 JN_{12} | 15 May 2009 | list |
| (305993) 2009 KJ_{3} | 24 May 2009 | list |
| (305994) 2009 KG_{7} | 18 May 2009 | list |
| 306001 Joanllaneras | 15 October 2009 | list |
| (306153) 2010 KV_{117} | 19 May 2010 | list |
| (309319) 2007 SO | 17 September 2007 | list |
| (309320) 2007 SZ | 17 September 2007 | list |
| (309522) 2007 XX_{17} | 11 December 2007 | list |
| (309566) 2008 AV_{32} | 14 January 2008 | list |
| (309622) 2008 CJ_{68} | 5 February 2008 | list |
| (309739) 2008 TB_{158} | 5 October 2008 | list |
| (309846) 2009 CD_{50} | 14 February 2009 | list |
| (309851) 2009 DB_{17} | 19 February 2009 | list |
| (309856) 2009 DX_{40} | 16 February 2009 | list |
| (309857) 2009 DT_{41} | 18 February 2009 | list |
| (309898) 2009 EO_{3} | 14 March 2009 | list |
| (309899) 2009 EK_{4} | 15 March 2009 | list |
| (309902) 2009 EF_{21} | 15 March 2009 | list |
| (309903) 2009 EZ_{21} | 15 March 2009 | list |
| (309920) 2009 FS_{24} | 21 March 2009 | list |

| (309921) 2009 FX_{24} | 22 March 2009 | list |
| (309932) 2009 FK_{62} | 23 March 2009 | list |
| (310006) 2009 KU_{1} | 17 May 2009 | list |
| (310007) 2009 KK_{3} | 24 May 2009 | list |
| 310025 Marcuscooper | 14 October 2009 | list |
| (310026) 2009 UQ_{131} | 16 October 2009 | list |
| (310072) 2010 KD_{62} | 18 May 2010 | list |
| (310101) 2010 RO_{69} | 6 September 2010 | list |
| (311999) 2007 NS2 | 14 July 2007 | list |
| (312179) 2007 VS_{10} | 5 November 2007 | list |
| (312248) 2007 YC_{59} | 31 December 2007 | list |
| (312295) 2008 CY_{1} | 1 February 2008 | list |
| (312515) 2009 DD_{15} | 16 February 2009 | list |
| (312538) 2009 EH_{20} | 15 March 2009 | list |
| (312548) 2009 FQ_{24} | 20 March 2009 | list |
| (312552) 2009 FB_{41} | 20 March 2009 | list |
| (312586) 2009 HS_{88} | 30 April 2009 | list |
| (312587) 2009 HW_{89} | 30 April 2009 | list |
| (312604) 2009 OK_{3} | 19 July 2009 | list |
| (312605) 2009 OG_{6} | 19 July 2009 | list |
| 312627 Brigitteyagüe | 14 October 2009 | list |
| (312653) 2010 KQ_{36} | 18 May 2010 | list |
| (314687) 2006 RK | 2 September 2006 | list |
| (315187) 2007 OS_{1} | 19 July 2007 | list |
| (315455) 2007 XY_{20} | 12 December 2007 | list |

| (315494) 2008 AQ_{2} | 7 January 2008 | list |
| (315496) 2008 AW_{3} | 6 January 2008 | list |
| (315552) 2008 CM_{5} | 5 February 2008 | list |
| (315557) 2008 CT_{22} | 7 February 2008 | list |
| (315676) 2008 ER_{8} | 6 March 2008 | list |
| (315793) 2008 GK_{1} | 3 April 2008 | list |
| (315898) 2008 QD4 | 25 August 2008 | list |
| (315929) 2008 SQ_{219} | 30 September 2008 | list |
| 315941 Elenagómez | 3 October 2008 | list |
| (315987) 2009 DA_{16} | 16 February 2009 | list |
| (315989) 2009 DU_{42} | 21 February 2009 | list |
| (316001) 2009 EN_{4} | 15 March 2009 | list |
| (316005) 2009 EC_{21} | 15 March 2009 | list |
| (316008) 2009 FQ_{1} | 16 March 2009 | list |
| (316012) 2009 FE_{17} | 16 March 2009 | list |
| (316013) 2009 FQ_{17} | 17 March 2009 | list |
| (316018) 2009 FC_{24} | 19 March 2009 | list |
| (316019) 2009 FY_{24} | 22 March 2009 | list |
| (316050) 2009 HQ_{45} | 21 April 2009 | list |
| (316051) 2009 HV_{45} | 21 April 2009 | list |
| (316062) 2009 HQ_{77} | 23 April 2009 | list |
| (316063) 2009 HT_{77} | 23 April 2009 | list |
| (316077) 2009 JO_{12} | 15 May 2009 | list |
| (316099) 2009 OU_{3} | 16 July 2009 | list |
| (316100) 2009 OG_{5} | 25 July 2009 | list |

| (316108) 2009 PO_{4} | 14 August 2009 | list |
| (316109) 2009 PL_{5} | 15 August 2009 | list |
| (316117) 2009 QT_{21} | 20 August 2009 | list |
| (316118) 2009 QY_{22} | 20 August 2009 | list |
| (316122) 2009 QP_{31} | 21 August 2009 | list |
| (316124) 2009 QH_{47} | 28 August 2009 | list |
| (316154) 2009 TP_{39} | 14 October 2009 | list |
| (316155) 2009 TW_{41} | 15 October 2009 | list |
| (316268) 2010 PJ_{26} | 7 August 2010 | list |
| (316284) 2010 PY_{76} | 11 August 2010 | list |
| (316294) 2010 RD_{38} | 5 September 2010 | list |
| (316295) 2010 RD_{40} | 4 September 2010 | list |
| (316484) 2010 VM_{61} | 4 November 2010 | list |
| (316553) 2010 YT_{1} | 14 October 2009 | list |
| (318159) 2004 QH | 17 August 2004 | list |
| (320253) 2007 OF | 16 July 2007 | list |
| (320504) 2007 XS_{20} | 12 December 2007 | list |
| (320540) 2008 AN_{2} | 6 January 2008 | list |
| (320586) 2008 BS_{18} | 30 January 2008 | list |
| (320587) 2008 BW_{18} | 29 January 2008 | list |
| (320868) 2008 GL_{1} | 3 April 2008 | list |
| (320948) 2008 HK_{2} | 25 April 2008 | list |
| (321033) 2008 PL_{7} | 5 August 2008 | list |
| (321034) 2008 PH_{8} | 6 August 2008 | list |
| (321042) 2008 QY_{27} | 30 August 2008 | list |

| (321043) 2008 QF_{28} | 30 August 2008 | list |
| (321047) 2008 QR_{33} | 26 August 2008 | list |
| (321050) 2008 RY_{27} | 1 September 2008 | list |
| (321110) 2008 TF_{94} | 5 October 2008 | list |
| (321196) 2008 YD_{8} | 23 December 2008 | list |
| (321202) 2008 YH_{23} | 20 December 2008 | list |
| (321259) 2009 DK_{15} | 16 February 2009 | list |
| (321261) 2009 DL_{42} | 18 February 2009 | list |
| (321280) 2009 EB_{21} | 15 March 2009 | list |
| (321287) 2009 FK_{17} | 16 March 2009 | list |
| (321315) 2009 HN_{45} | 21 April 2009 | list |
| (321327) 2009 HS_{77} | 23 April 2009 | list |
| (321362) 2009 MA_{8} | 26 June 2009 | list |
| (321364) 2009 NP | 13 July 2009 | list |
| (321365) 2009 OD_{1} | 16 July 2009 | list |
| (321366) 2009 OE_{2} | 16 July 2009 | list |
| (321367) 2009 OF_{2} | 16 July 2009 | list |
| (321368) 2009 OM_{2} | 19 July 2009 | list |
| (321370) 2009 OA_{6} | 18 July 2009 | list |
| (321371) 2009 OF_{6} | 19 July 2009 | list |
| (321374) 2009 OT_{8} | 26 July 2009 | list |
| (321375) 2009 OX_{8} | 27 July 2009 | list |
| (321381) 2009 OJ_{21} | 25 July 2009 | list |
| (321384) 2009 PN_{2} | 13 August 2009 | list |
| (321386) 2009 PX_{4} | 15 August 2009 | list |

| (321399) 2009 PK_{17} | 15 August 2009 | list |
| (321420) 2009 QY_{19} | 19 August 2009 | list |
| (321421) 2009 QB_{21} | 19 August 2009 | list |
| (321422) 2009 QJ_{21} | 19 August 2009 | list |
| (321423) 2009 QH_{23} | 16 August 2009 | list |
| (321424) 2009 QQ_{25} | 17 August 2009 | list |
| (321425) 2009 QY_{25} | 18 August 2009 | list |
| (321426) 2009 QF_{28} | 20 August 2009 | list |
| (321428) 2009 QK_{33} | 24 August 2009 | list |
| (321430) 2009 QN_{35} | 29 August 2009 | list |
| (321431) 2009 QQ_{35} | 29 August 2009 | list |
| (321433) 2009 QM_{42} | 26 August 2009 | list |
| (321434) 2009 QN_{42} | 26 August 2009 | list |
| (321436) 2009 QF_{45} | 27 August 2009 | list |
| (321438) 2009 QC_{48} | 28 August 2009 | list |
| (321449) 2009 QW_{60} | 22 August 2009 | list |
| (321450) 2009 QN_{63} | 20 August 2009 | list |
| (321458) 2009 RL_{22} | 14 August 2009 | list |
| (321474) 2009 RK_{61} | 11 September 2009 | list |
| (321576) 2009 TY_{20} | 11 October 2009 | list |
| (321585) 2009 UP_{25} | 18 October 2009 | list |
| (321632) 2009 WF_{195} | 25 November 2009 | list |
| (321650) 2010 BH_{6} | 21 January 2010 | list |
| (321699) 2010 EO_{140} | 10 March 2010 | list |
| (321855) 2010 RZ_{129} | 13 September 2010 | list |

| (324895) 2007 VW_{95} | 7 November 2007 | list |
| (324934) 2007 XZ_{20} | 12 December 2007 | list |
| (324972) 2008 AJ_{32} | 7 January 2008 | list |
| (325032) 2008 CJ_{72} | 8 February 2008 | list |
| (325411) 2009 KQ_{1} | 17 May 2009 | list |
| (325422) 2009 NN_{1} | 15 July 2009 | list |
| (325425) 2009 OZ_{5} | 17 July 2009 | list |
| (325426) 2009 OZ_{8} | 28 July 2009 | list |
| (325427) 2009 OG_{9} | 28 July 2009 | list |
| (325434) 2009 OW_{20} | 25 July 2009 | list |
| (325445) 2009 QG_{6} | 18 August 2009 | list |
| (325453) 2009 QZ_{20} | 19 August 2009 | list |
| (325456) 2009 QT_{27} | 17 August 2009 | list |
| (325461) 2009 QU_{46} | 27 August 2009 | list |
| 325462 Felanitx | 28 August 2009 | list |
| (325477) 2009 RG_{1} | 11 September 2009 | list |
| (325478) 2009 RK_{1} | 10 September 2009 | list |
| (325496) 2009 RP_{19} | 14 September 2009 | list |
| (325518) 2009 RY_{61} | 14 September 2009 | list |
| (325537) 2009 SG_{49} | 17 September 2009 | list |
| (325670) 2009 TP_{2} | 10 October 2009 | list |
| (325674) 2009 TQ_{6} | 12 October 2009 | list |
| (325675) 2009 TZ_{8} | 12 October 2009 | list |
| (325681) 2009 TX_{37} | 13 October 2009 | list |
| (325683) 2009 TQ_{38} | 15 October 2009 | list |

| (325684) 2009 TL_{39} | 15 October 2009 | list |
| (325691) 2009 UP_{15} | 17 October 2009 | list |
| (325695) 2009 UF_{23} | 17 October 2009 | list |
| (325723) 2009 UH_{140} | 18 October 2009 | list |
| (325734) 2009 VH_{50} | 12 November 2009 | list |
| (325754) 2009 WE_{93} | 19 November 2009 | list |
| (325755) 2009 WU_{97} | 20 November 2009 | list |
| (325759) 2009 WG_{204} | 16 November 2009 | list |
| (325789) 2010 QD_{1} | 16 August 2010 | list |
| (325834) 2010 SV_{29} | 29 September 2010 | list |
| (328051) 2007 OW | 17 July 2007 | list |
| (328105) 2008 AZ_{31} | 12 January 2008 | list |
| (328106) 2008 AA_{32} | 12 January 2008 | list |
| (328145) 2008 CE_{2} | 1 February 2008 | list |
| (328356) 2008 MT | 27 June 2008 | list |
| (328368) 2008 QT_{10} | 26 August 2008 | list |
| (328375) 2008 QR_{27} | 30 August 2008 | list |
| (328376) 2008 QH_{28} | 30 August 2008 | list |
| (328430) 2008 TG_{4} | 1 October 2008 | list |
| (328431) 2008 TK_{4} | 1 October 2008 | list |
| (328447) 2008 TT_{92} | 4 October 2008 | list |
| (328487) 2009 MX_{8} | 28 June 2009 | list |
| (328490) 2009 ON_{2} | 19 July 2009 | list |
| (328492) 2009 OC_{6} | 19 July 2009 | list |
| (328494) 2009 OX_{20} | 25 July 2009 | list |

| (328495) 2009 OZ_{24} | 26 July 2009 | list |
| (328496) 2009 PQ_{3} | 12 August 2009 | list |
| (328508) 2009 QH_{9} | 21 August 2009 | list |
| (328512) 2009 QR_{11} | 16 August 2009 | list |
| (328515) 2009 QR_{19} | 19 August 2009 | list |
| (328516) 2009 QA_{20} | 19 August 2009 | list |
| (328518) 2009 QF_{22} | 20 August 2009 | list |
| (328521) 2009 QA_{29} | 23 August 2009 | list |
| (328523) 2009 QY_{47} | 28 August 2009 | list |
| (328529) 2009 QA_{62} | 28 August 2009 | list |
| (328586) 2009 SQ_{49} | 17 September 2009 | list |
| (328703) 2009 TN_{1} | 11 October 2009 | list |
| (328705) 2009 TG_{3} | 10 October 2009 | list |
| (328707) 2009 TS_{6} | 12 October 2009 | list |
| (328710) 2009 TZ_{10} | 11 October 2009 | list |
| (328713) 2009 TB_{14} | 11 October 2009 | list |
| (328714) 2009 TE_{17} | 15 October 2009 | list |
| (328715) 2009 TH_{17} | 15 October 2009 | list |
| (328717) 2009 TA_{18} | 15 October 2009 | list |
| (328719) 2009 TZ_{20} | 11 October 2009 | list |
| (328720) 2009 TA_{21} | 11 October 2009 | list |
| (328721) 2009 TR_{21} | 12 October 2009 | list |
| (328725) 2009 TP_{36} | 14 October 2009 | list |
| (328730) 2009 TE_{45} | 14 October 2009 | list |
| (328736) 2009 UC_{12} | 17 October 2009 | list |

| (328757) 2009 UC_{88} | 19 October 2009 | list |
| (328767) 2009 UD_{102} | 15 October 2009 | list |
| (328779) 2009 UG_{137} | 28 October 2009 | list |
| (328808) 2009 VT_{57} | 12 November 2009 | list |
| (328943) 2010 VB_{61} | 6 October 2010 | list |
| (330367) 2006 WY_{28} | 18 November 2006 | list |
| (330533) 2007 XZ_{15} | 8 December 2007 | list |
| (330619) 2008 EW_{7} | 1 March 2008 | list |
| (330675) 2008 HK_{4} | 28 April 2008 | list |
| (330708) 2008 OS | 25 July 2008 | list |
| (330709) 2008 OV_{7} | 28 July 2008 | list |
| (330713) 2008 PC_{8} | 5 August 2008 | list |
| (330714) 2008 PB_{10} | 5 August 2008 | list |
| (330721) 2008 QZ_{25} | 29 August 2008 | list |
| (330722) 2008 QT_{34} | 24 August 2008 | list |
| (330725) 2008 RM_{22} | 3 September 2008 | list |
| (330774) 2008 TA_{6} | 3 October 2008 | list |
| (330775) 2008 TL_{6} | 3 October 2008 | list |
| (330828) 2009 EQ_{3} | 14 March 2009 | list |
| (330834) 2009 HS_{36} | 20 April 2009 | list |
| (330838) 2009 ND | 3 July 2009 | list |
| (330839) 2009 OS_{4} | 20 July 2009 | list |
| (330840) 2009 OW_{4} | 25 July 2009 | list |
| (330842) 2009 OR_{8} | 26 July 2009 | list |
| (330843) 2009 OC_{20} | 28 July 2009 | list |

| (330846) 2009 PX_{3} | 14 August 2009 | list |
| (330847) 2009 PZ_{4} | 15 August 2009 | list |
| (330858) 2009 QP_{23} | 16 August 2009 | list |
| (330866) 2009 QJ_{47} | 28 August 2009 | list |
| (330867) 2009 QB_{48} | 28 August 2009 | list |
| (330872) 2009 RF_{1} | 10 September 2009 | list |
| (330879) 2009 RX_{28} | 14 September 2009 | list |
| (330890) 2009 RM_{61} | 12 September 2009 | list |
| (330917) 2009 SH_{104} | 26 September 2009 | list |
| (330974) 2009 TR_{1} | 8 October 2009 | list |
| (330976) 2009 TY_{10} | 11 October 2009 | list |
| (330981) 2009 TQ_{22} | 14 October 2009 | list |
| (330977) 2009 TY_{11} | 15 October 2009 | list |
| (330982) 2009 TX_{26} | 14 October 2009 | list |
| (331020) 2009 UP_{139} | 26 October 2009 | list |
| (331036) 2009 VX_{49} | 11 November 2009 | list |
| (331037) 2009 VM_{50} | 13 November 2009 | list |
| (331038) 2009 VN_{50} | 13 November 2009 | list |
| (331062) 2009 WA_{16} | 16 November 2009 | list |
| (331071) 2009 WO_{52} | 19 November 2009 | list |
| (331078) 2009 WD_{93} | 19 November 2009 | list |
| (331308) 2011 EM_{64} | 16 November 2009 | list |
| (332535) 2008 PJ_{2} | 2 August 2008 | list |
| (332542) 2008 QT_{8} | 25 August 2008 | list |
| (332543) 2008 QE_{10} | 26 August 2008 | list |

| (332544) 2008 QX_{10} | 26 August 2008 | list |
| (332551) 2008 RA | 1 September 2008 | list |
| (332554) 2008 RX_{21} | 2 September 2008 | list |
| (332568) 2008 RW_{133} | 12 August 2008 | list |
| (332608) 2008 TH_{6} | 3 October 2008 | list |
| (332609) 2008 TR_{6} | 3 October 2008 | list |
| (332686) 2009 OL_{2} | 19 July 2009 | list |
| (332695) 2009 RM_{1} | 10 September 2009 | list |
| (332696) 2009 RM_{19} | 14 September 2009 | list |
| (332697) 2009 RO_{19} | 14 September 2009 | list |
| 332733 Drolshagen | 21 September 2009 | list |
| (332740) 2009 TT_{3} | 10 October 2009 | list |
| (332743) 2009 TY_{13} | 10 October 2009 | list |
| (332744) 2009 TV_{14} | 14 October 2009 | list |
| (332746) 2009 TW_{20} | 11 October 2009 | list |
| (332747) 2009 TM_{23} | 14 October 2009 | list |
| (332748) 2009 TF_{27} | 14 October 2009 | list |
| (332750) 2009 TY_{27} | 15 October 2009 | list |
| (332751) 2009 TV_{46} | 12 October 2009 | list |
| (332786) 2009 VA_{77} | 15 October 2009 | list |
| (332788) 2009 VC_{81} | 14 November 2009 | list |
| (332814) 2009 WE_{195} | 25 November 2009 | list |
| (332844) 2010 EW_{87} | 13 March 2010 | list |
| (332951) 2011 DU_{43} | 5 August 2008 | list |
| (333637) 2008 QZ_{10} | 26 August 2008 | list |

| (333712) 2009 DW_{16} | 18 February 2009 | list |
| (333723) 2009 TT_{22} | 14 October 2009 | list |
| (333724) 2009 TG_{35} | 14 October 2009 | list |
| (333725) 2009 TX_{39} | 14 October 2009 | list |
| (335782) 2007 FR_{4} | 19 March 2007 | list |
| (336079) 2008 GA_{1} | 2 April 2008 | list |
| (336119) 2008 NY_{1} | 7 July 2008 | list |
| (336122) 2008 OA_{8} | 29 July 2008 | list |
| (336124) 2008 OQ_{18} | 29 July 2008 | list |
| (336129) 2008 PD_{8} | 5 August 2008 | list |
| (336130) 2008 PL_{8} | 6 August 2008 | list |
| (336135) 2008 QV_{1} | 24 August 2008 | list |
| (336137) 2008 QY_{7} | 25 August 2008 | list |
| (336138) 2008 QP_{9} | 25 August 2008 | list |
| (336139) 2008 QW_{12} | 26 August 2008 | list |
| (336141) 2008 QM_{17} | 27 August 2008 | list |
| (336145) 2008 QA_{27} | 30 August 2008 | list |
| (336149) 2008 QA_{40} | 26 August 2008 | list |
| (336162) 2008 RV_{21} | 2 September 2008 | list |
| (336163) 2008 RN_{22} | 3 September 2008 | list |
| (336273) 2008 SF_{218} | 30 September 2008 | list |
| (336305) 2008 TR_{5} | 1 October 2008 | list |
| (336306) 2008 TF_{6} | 3 October 2008 | list |
| (336334) 2008 TG_{92} | 4 October 2008 | list |
| (336335) 2008 TU_{92} | 4 October 2008 | list |

| (336336) 2008 TF_{93} | 5 October 2008 | list |
| (336337) 2008 TG_{93} | 5 October 2008 | list |
| (336359) 2008 TC_{184} | 4 October 2008 | list |
| (336471) 2008 VS_{14} | 9 November 2008 | list |
| (336488) 2008 VL_{64} | 10 November 2008 | list |
| (336493) 2008 WK_{14} | 17 November 2008 | list |
| (336530) 2008 YJ_{135} | 30 December 2008 | list |
| (336551) 2009 CZ_{50} | 14 February 2009 | list |
| (336552) 2009 DC_{15} | 16 February 2009 | list |
| (336594) 2009 TY_{1} | 10 October 2009 | list |
| (336595) 2009 TJ_{9} | 14 October 2009 | list |
| (336598) 2009 TE_{21} | 11 October 2009 | list |
| (336599) 2009 TB_{28} | 15 October 2009 | list |
| (336628) 2009 VF_{75} | 12 November 2009 | list |
| (336632) 2009 VV_{105} | 10 November 2009 | list |
| (336637) 2009 WD_{35} | 16 November 2009 | list |
| (336707) 2010 CR_{70} | 26 August 2008 | list |
| (341118) 2007 LZ_{14} | 12 June 2007 | list |
| (341135) 2007 OE | 16 July 2007 | list |
| (341358) 2007 TS_{66} | 11 October 2007 | list |
| (341627) 2007 VN_{4} | 3 November 2007 | list |
| (341795) 2007 XF_{15} | 6 December 2007 | list |
| (341800) 2007 XP_{25} | 14 December 2007 | list |
| (341930) 2008 NR_{2} | 10 July 2008 | list |
| (341937) 2008 OG_{9} | 29 July 2008 | list |

| (341947) 2008 PC_{1} | 1 August 2008 | list |
| (341948) 2008 PH_{2} | 2 August 2008 | list |
| (341951) 2008 PK_{5} | 5 August 2008 | list |
| (341960) 2008 QJ_{1} | 23 August 2008 | list |
| (341961) 2008 QL_{1} | 23 August 2008 | list |
| (341962) 2008 QU_{1} | 24 August 2008 | list |
| (341963) 2008 QX_{1} | 24 August 2008 | list |
| (341966) 2008 QS_{10} | 26 August 2008 | list |
| (341971) 2008 QN_{17} | 27 August 2008 | list |
| (341973) 2008 QO_{26} | 29 August 2008 | list |
| (341980) 2008 QZ_{39} | 26 August 2008 | list |
| (341981) 2008 QF_{40} | 27 August 2008 | list |
| (341997) 2008 RO_{22} | 3 September 2008 | list |
| (342009) 2008 RJ_{47} | 2 September 2008 | list |
| (342200) 2008 SG_{218} | 30 September 2008 | list |
| (342201) 2008 SW_{218} | 30 September 2008 | list |
| (342202) 2008 SE_{220} | 30 September 2008 | list |
| (342214) 2008 SG_{246} | 30 September 2008 | list |
| (342271) 2008 TJ_{5} | 1 October 2008 | list |
| (342273) 2008 TY_{6} | 3 October 2008 | list |
| (342274) 2008 TZ_{7} | 4 October 2008 | list |
| (342324) 2008 TK_{92} | 4 October 2008 | list |
| (342325) 2008 TQ_{94} | 5 October 2008 | list |
| (342345) 2008 TZ_{157} | 4 October 2008 | list |
| (342348) 2008 TN_{162} | 4 October 2008 | list |

| (342653) 2008 VG_{3} | 6 October 2008 | list |
| (342690) 2008 VK_{64} | 10 November 2008 | list |
| (342691) 2008 VQ_{64} | 10 November 2008 | list |
| (342745) 2008 WT_{61} | 22 November 2008 | list |
| (342769) 2008 WS_{98} | 23 November 2008 | list |
| (342770) 2008 WV_{98} | 23 November 2008 | list |
| (342771) 2008 WH_{101} | 26 November 2008 | list |
| (342859) 2008 YF_{23} | 19 December 2008 | list |
| (342860) 2008 YL_{23} | 20 December 2008 | list |
| (342861) 2008 YF_{24} | 22 December 2008 | list |
| (342993) 2009 BW_{60} | 17 January 2009 | list |
| (343086) 2009 DZ_{16} | 18 February 2009 | list |
| (343095) 2009 DS_{40} | 16 February 2009 | list |
| (343096) 2009 DH_{41} | 18 February 2009 | list |
| (343097) 2009 DN_{41} | 18 February 2009 | list |
| (343119) 2009 EM_{3} | 14 March 2009 | list |
| (343127) 2009 EG_{21} | 15 March 2009 | list |
| (343128) 2009 EV_{21} | 14 March 2009 | list |
| (343132) 2009 FV | 16 March 2009 | list |
| (343136) 2009 FF_{24} | 20 March 2009 | list |
| (343137) 2009 FA_{25} | 22 March 2009 | list |
| (343457) 2010 ET_{39} | 10 March 2010 | list |
| (343487) 2010 EY_{87} | 14 March 2010 | list |
| (343536) 2010 ER_{140} | 10 March 2010 | list |
| (343873) 2011 HB_{75} | 15 July 2007 | list |

| (345846) 2007 NU_{1} | 12 July 2007 | list |
| (345876) 2007 RQ_{6} | 4 September 2007 | list |
| (345930) 2007 RN_{240} | 21 August 2007 | list |
| (346193) 2007 XZ_{19} | 12 December 2007 | list |
| (346197) 2007 XH_{25} | 15 December 2007 | list |
| (346217) 2007 YS_{47} | 30 December 2007 | list |
| (346288) 2008 NP_{2} | 9 July 2008 | list |
| (346295) 2008 PW_{7} | 5 August 2008 | list |
| (346297) 2008 PK_{12} | 8 August 2008 | list |
| (346298) 2008 PH_{15} | 10 August 2008 | list |
| (346301) 2008 QD_{2} | 24 August 2008 | list |
| (346304) 2008 QV_{9} | 26 August 2008 | list |
| (346306) 2008 QF_{10} | 26 August 2008 | list |
| (346307) 2008 QK_{10} | 26 August 2008 | list |
| (346308) 2008 QA_{11} | 26 August 2008 | list |
| (346309) 2008 QK_{12} | 26 August 2008 | list |
| (346311) 2008 QJ_{13} | 27 August 2008 | list |
| (346313) 2008 QK_{17} | 27 August 2008 | list |
| (346316) 2008 QM_{26} | 29 August 2008 | list |
| (346321) 2008 QY_{39} | 26 August 2008 | list |
| (346322) 2008 QW_{41} | 26 August 2008 | list |
| (346330) 2008 RZ_{21} | 3 September 2008 | list |
| (346426) 2008 SF_{219} | 30 September 2008 | list |
| (346443) 2008 TP_{7} | 3 October 2008 | list |
| (346444) 2008 TD_{8} | 4 October 2008 | list |

| (346463) 2008 TB_{94} | 5 October 2008 | list |
| (346598) 2008 WZ_{21} | 18 November 2008 | list |
| (346619) 2008 WA_{93} | 26 November 2008 | list |
| (346659) 2008 YZ_{7} | 22 December 2008 | list |
| (346815) 2009 CE_{50} | 14 February 2009 | list |
| (346833) 2009 DT_{15} | 16 February 2009 | list |
| (346834) 2009 DM_{16} | 17 February 2009 | list |
| (346859) 2009 ET_{21} | 14 March 2009 | list |
| (346869) 2009 FT_{24} | 21 March 2009 | list |
| (346884) 2009 JX_{12} | 15 May 2009 | list |
| (346888) 2009 PB_{10} | 15 August 2009 | list |
| (346961) 2010 CU_{1} | 2 February 2010 | list |
| (346964) 2010 CR_{4} | 6 February 2010 | list |
| (346965) 2010 CS_{4} | 6 February 2010 | list |
| (347022) 2010 EV_{35} | 10 March 2010 | list |
| (347024) 2010 EQ_{39} | 10 March 2010 | list |
| (347056) 2010 EZ_{138} | 14 March 2010 | list |
| (349149) 2007 NY_{1} | 13 July 2007 | list |
| (349170) 2007 RT_{7} | 5 September 2007 | list |
| (349329) 2007 VS_{5} | 4 November 2007 | list |
| (349379) 2007 WR_{3} | 17 November 2007 | list |
| (349390) 2007 XT_{15} | 8 December 2007 | list |
| (349391) 2007 XG_{18} | 12 December 2007 | list |
| (349446) 2008 CA_{2} | 1 February 2008 | list |
| (349459) 2008 CH_{118} | 11 February 2008 | list |

| (349498) 2008 ND_{3} | 11 July 2008 | list |
| (349500) 2008 OH_{8} | 29 July 2008 | list |
| (349505) 2008 PE_{14} | 10 August 2008 | list |
| (349510) 2008 QP_{12} | 26 August 2008 | list |
| (349511) 2008 QR_{12} | 26 August 2008 | list |
| (349586) 2008 TQ_{5} | 1 October 2008 | list |
| (349587) 2008 TT_{7} | 3 October 2008 | list |
| (349588) 2008 TZ_{9} | 4 October 2008 | list |
| (349596) 2008 TE_{93} | 5 October 2008 | list |
| (349667) 2008 WN_{10} | 18 November 2008 | list |
| (349684) 2008 WY_{98} | 24 November 2008 | list |
| (349853) 2009 DX_{15} | 16 February 2009 | list |
| (349861) 2009 DW_{41} | 19 February 2009 | list |
| (349873) 2009 DC_{71} | 17 February 2009 | list |
| (349897) 2009 FM_{24} | 20 March 2009 | list |
| (350046) 2010 NV_{117} | 11 July 2010 | list |
| (352370) 2007 VG_{244} | 15 November 2007 | list |
| (352401) 2007 XS_{9} | 5 December 2007 | list |
| (352477) 2008 BL_{16} | 29 January 2008 | list |
| (352492) 2008 CL_{5} | 5 February 2008 | list |
| (352509) 2008 CP_{75} | 10 February 2008 | list |
| (352585) 2008 EJ_{8} | 3 March 2008 | list |
| (352647) 2008 OD_{14} | 31 July 2008 | list |
| (352651) 2008 QA_{9} | 25 August 2008 | list |
| (352653) 2008 QE_{17} | 27 August 2008 | list |

| (352656) 2008 QR_{29} | 24 August 2008 | list |
| (352657) 2008 QS_{33} | 27 August 2008 | list |
| (352658) 2008 QZ_{33} | 28 August 2008 | list |
| (352719) 2008 SU_{218} | 30 September 2008 | list |
| (352744) 2008 TT_{82} | 3 October 2008 | list |
| (352836) 2008 VU_{14} | 10 November 2008 | list |
| (353041) 2009 CO_{51} | 14 February 2009 | list |
| (353042) 2009 CP_{53} | 14 February 2009 | list |
| (353051) 2009 DA_{42} | 19 February 2009 | list |
| (353052) 2009 DN_{42} | 18 February 2009 | list |
| (353064) 2009 DO_{71} | 19 February 2009 | list |
| (353066) 2009 DG_{77} | 22 February 2009 | list |
| (353117) 2009 FE_{24} | 20 March 2009 | list |
| (353118) 2009 FJ_{24} | 20 March 2009 | list |
| 353171 Cosmebauçà | 11 June 2009 | list |
| (353177) 2009 OF_{21} | 29 July 2009 | list |
| (353252) 2010 EU_{39} | 11 March 2010 | list |
| 353432 Cabrerabalears | 23 July 2007 | list |
| (355495) 2007 XP_{20} | 12 December 2007 | list |
| (355548) 2008 BS_{24} | 31 January 2008 | list |
| (355740) 2008 HV_{3} | 28 April 2008 | list |
| (355819) 2008 TB_{83} | 3 October 2008 | list |
| (355897) 2008 WW_{61} | 22 November 2008 | list |
| (355903) 2008 WS_{90} | 23 November 2008 | list |
| (355904) 2008 WY_{102} | 27 November 2008 | list |

| (355916) 2008 YL_{1} | 20 December 2008 | list |
| (356071) 2009 DO_{77} | 23 February 2009 | list |
| (356096) 2009 EE_{4} | 15 March 2009 | list |
| (356097) 2009 EO_{4} | 15 March 2009 | list |
| (356098) 2009 EP_{16} | 19 February 2009 | list |
| (356109) 2009 FT_{17} | 18 March 2009 | list |
| (356116) 2009 FJ_{28} | 22 March 2009 | list |
| (356119) 2009 FW_{30} | 19 March 2009 | list |
| (356120) 2009 FX_{31} | 25 March 2009 | list |
| (356132) 2009 FS_{55} | 26 March 2009 | list |
| (356162) 2009 HU_{36} | 21 April 2009 | list |
| (356165) 2009 HU_{45} | 21 April 2009 | list |
| (356189) 2009 KE_{7} | 26 May 2009 | list |
| (356197) 2009 OB_{1} | 16 July 2009 | list |
| (356198) 2009 OJ_{6} | 23 July 2009 | list |
| (358605) 2007 VE_{12} | 4 November 2007 | list |
| (358963) 2008 NA_{1} | 2 July 2008 | list |
| (358999) 2008 TC_{94} | 5 October 2008 | list |
| (359037) 2008 WW_{98} | 23 November 2008 | list |
| (359244) 2009 FO_{1} | 16 March 2009 | list |
| (359252) 2009 FZ_{24} | 22 March 2009 | list |
| (359259) 2009 FF_{41} | 21 March 2009 | list |
| (359294) 2009 HS_{45} | 21 April 2009 | list |
| (359295) 2009 HZ_{45} | 22 April 2009 | list |
| (359297) 2009 HN_{77} | 22 April 2009 | list |

| (359330) 2009 OO_{6} | 26 July 2009 | list |
| (359337) 2009 QL_{43} | 27 August 2009 | list |
| (359473) 2010 NZ_{117} | 14 July 2010 | list |
| (359504) 2010 QM | 16 August 2010 | list |
| (359640) 2011 QF_{70} | 24 August 2011 | list |
| (359724) 2011 UH_{24} | 18 July 2007 | list |
| (361264) 2006 SB_{370} | 18 September 2006 | list |
| (361675) 2007 UA_{6} | 21 October 2007 | list |
| (361802) 2008 CS_{20} | 4 February 2008 | list |
| (361998) 2008 TS_{91} | 4 October 2008 | list |
| (362125) 2009 DU_{15} | 16 February 2009 | list |
| (362169) 2009 FU_{3} | 18 March 2009 | list |
| (362224) 2009 HH_{88} | 23 April 2009 | list |
| (362232) 2009 JL | 2 May 2009 | list |
| (362236) 2009 KO_{1} | 16 May 2009 | list |
| (362252) 2009 LV | 11 June 2009 | list |
| (362253) 2009 LW | 11 June 2009 | list |
| (362258) 2009 NT_{1} | 15 July 2009 | list |
| (362260) 2009 OE_{3} | 19 July 2009 | list |
| (362272) 2009 QC_{5} | 16 August 2009 | list |
| (362308) 2009 TQ_{31} | 15 October 2009 | list |
| (362415) 2010 PH_{57} | 4 August 2010 | list |
| (362423) 2010 PB_{79} | 7 August 2010 | list |
| (362425) 2010 QO_{3} | 30 August 2010 | list |
| (362427) 2010 QX_{5} | 16 August 2010 | list |

| (362436) 2010 RJ_{52} | 4 September 2010 | list |
| (362437) 2010 RK_{52} | 4 September 2010 | list |
| 362911 Miguelhurtado | 29 August 2009 | list |
| (364616) 2007 SO_{4} | 19 September 2007 | list |
| (364814) 2008 BA_{41} | 31 January 2008 | list |
| (365017) 2008 PB_{11} | 5 August 2008 | list |
| (365051) 2008 WL_{2} | 18 November 2008 | list |
| (365127) 2009 DE_{16} | 17 February 2009 | list |
| (365174) 2009 ES_{21} | 13 March 2009 | list |
| (365177) 2009 FR_{1} | 16 March 2009 | list |
| (365195) 2009 FC_{41} | 20 March 2009 | list |
| (365244) 2009 MB_{8} | 27 June 2009 | list |
| (365247) 2009 NU | 14 July 2009 | list |
| (365249) 2009 OQ_{6} | 26 July 2009 | list |
| (365258) 2009 PH_{3} | 12 August 2009 | list |
| (365264) 2009 QQ_{4} | 16 August 2009 | list |
| (365265) 2009 QW_{4} | 16 August 2009 | list |
| (365270) 2009 QJ_{22} | 20 August 2009 | list |
| (365276) 2009 QP_{42} | 26 August 2009 | list |
| (365277) 2009 QT_{42} | 26 August 2009 | list |
| (365278) 2009 QV_{46} | 27 August 2009 | list |
| (365302) 2009 RH_{63} | 14 September 2009 | list |
| (365319) 2009 SW_{99} | 21 September 2009 | list |
| (365333) 2009 SY_{188} | 21 September 2009 | list |
| (365342) 2009 SR_{243} | 25 September 2009 | list |

| (365363) 2009 TK_{3} | 11 October 2009 | list |
| (365365) 2009 TL_{21} | 12 October 2009 | list |
| (365369) 2009 TF_{34} | 11 October 2009 | list |
| (365373) 2009 TE_{42} | 15 October 2009 | list |
| (365474) 2010 PX_{23} | 3 August 2010 | list |
| (365485) 2010 PA_{64} | 8 August 2010 | list |
| (365487) 2010 PG_{76} | 11 August 2010 | list |
| (365488) 2010 PM_{76} | 2 August 2010 | list |
| (365490) 2010 PX_{78} | 2 August 2010 | list |
| (365500) 2010 RY_{54} | 5 September 2010 | list |
| (365642) 2010 UN_{96} | 16 October 2010 | list |
| (367344) 2008 EF_{8} | 2 March 2008 | list |
| (367391) 2008 NZ | 2 July 2008 | list |
| (367396) 2008 PM_{5} | 3 August 2008 | list |
| (367397) 2008 PC_{10} | 5 August 2008 | list |
| (367398) 2008 PW_{11} | 10 August 2008 | list |
| (367399) 2008 PW_{13} | 10 August 2008 | list |
| (367400) 2008 PH_{14} | 10 August 2008 | list |
| (367407) 2008 QZ_{29} | 27 August 2008 | list |
| (367505) 2009 KK_{1} | 18 May 2009 | list |
| (367513) 2009 OY_{3} | 16 July 2009 | list |
| (367515) 2009 OD_{9} | 28 July 2009 | list |
| (367516) 2009 OT_{20} | 25 July 2009 | list |
| (367528) 2009 QE_{19} | 18 August 2009 | list |
| (367530) 2009 QC_{31} | 24 August 2009 | list |

| (367630) 2009 VW_{49} | 11 November 2009 | list |
| (367651) 2009 WJ_{93} | 19 November 2009 | list |
| (367662) 2009 XL_{20} | 9 December 2009 | list |
| 367943 Duende | 23 February 2012 | list |
| (368301) 2002 OH_{35} | 29 September 2008 | list |
| (369118) 2008 QO_{10} | 26 August 2008 | list |
| (369119) 2008 QC_{11} | 26 August 2008 | list |
| (369120) 2008 QV_{33} | 27 August 2008 | list |
| (369123) 2008 QH_{44} | 29 August 2008 | list |
| (369183) 2008 SH_{218} | 30 September 2008 | list |
| (369198) 2008 TD_{94} | 5 October 2008 | list |
| (369261) 2009 KB_{2} | 16 May 2009 | list |
| (369268) 2009 OA_{23} | 21 July 2009 | list |
| (369269) 2009 PG_{3} | 12 August 2009 | list |
| (369278) 2009 QK_{36} | 28 August 2009 | list |
| (369328) 2009 SD_{249} | 17 September 2009 | list |
| (369354) 2009 TN_{26} | 14 October 2009 | list |
| (369355) 2009 TT_{27} | 15 October 2009 | list |
| (369357) 2009 TC_{35} | 14 October 2009 | list |
| (369358) 2009 TW_{37} | 13 October 2009 | list |
| (369376) 2009 UB_{137} | 27 October 2009 | list |
| (369380) 2009 UD_{146} | 28 October 2009 | list |
| (369397) 2009 VP_{105} | 12 November 2009 | list |
| (369415) 2009 WN_{101} | 14 November 2009 | list |
| (369461) 2010 RC_{68} | 5 September 2010 | list |

| (369482) 2010 TW_{170} | 5 October 2010 | list |
| (369484) 2010 TT_{177} | 2 October 2010 | list |
| (372019) 2008 NS_{4} | 12 July 2008 | list |
| (372020) 2008 OC_{12} | 25 July 2008 | list |
| (372025) 2008 QX_{8} | 25 August 2008 | list |
| (372131) 2008 SC_{220} | 30 September 2008 | list |
| (372162) 2008 TZ_{5} | 3 October 2008 | list |
| (372206) 2008 TD_{158} | 5 October 2008 | list |
| (372324) 2008 YN_{23} | 20 December 2008 | list |
| (372347) 2009 FK_{31} | 25 March 2009 | list |
| (372362) 2009 HK_{77} | 21 April 2009 | list |
| (372369) 2009 LC | 2 June 2009 | list |
| (372372) 2009 OO_{4} | 19 July 2009 | list |
| (372373) 2009 OV_{4} | 21 July 2009 | list |
| (372374) 2009 OK_{21} | 25 July 2009 | list |
| (372375) 2009 OJ_{22} | 28 July 2009 | list |
| (372377) 2009 PN_{4} | 14 August 2009 | list |
| (372378) 2009 PP_{4} | 14 August 2009 | list |
| (372379) 2009 PW_{9} | 14 August 2009 | list |
| (372390) 2009 QH_{21} | 19 August 2009 | list |
| (372391) 2009 QK_{31} | 20 August 2009 | list |
| (372400) 2009 RM_{3} | 11 September 2009 | list |
| (372420) 2009 RW_{61} | 14 September 2009 | list |
| (372435) 2009 SE_{49} | 17 September 2009 | list |
| (372493) 2009 SO_{243} | 24 September 2009 | list |

| (372534) 2009 TS_{1} | 8 October 2009 | list |
| (372537) 2009 TN_{6} | 12 October 2009 | list |
| (372538) 2009 TF_{7} | 13 October 2009 | list |
| (372544) 2009 TJ_{23} | 14 October 2009 | list |
| (372546) 2009 TK_{26} | 14 October 2009 | list |
| (372547) 2009 TK_{27} | 14 October 2009 | list |
| (372549) 2009 TC_{34} | 10 October 2009 | list |
| (372550) 2009 TA_{35} | 14 October 2009 | list |
| (372595) 2009 UW_{139} | 27 October 2009 | list |
| (372597) 2009 UN_{145} | 18 October 2009 | list |
| (372625) 2009 VK_{50} | 12 November 2009 | list |
| (372682) 2009 WK_{155} | 19 November 2009 | list |
| (372692) 2009 WC_{195} | 24 November 2009 | list |
| (372706) 2009 WT_{250} | 24 November 2009 | list |
| (373842) 2003 FT | 21 March 2003 | list |
| (374724) 2006 SX_{49} | 20 September 2006 | list |
| (375293) 2008 OL_{1} | 26 July 2008 | list |
| (375295) 2008 OP_{9} | 29 July 2008 | list |
| (375296) 2008 PH_{7} | 5 August 2008 | list |
| (375297) 2008 PQ_{7} | 5 August 2008 | list |
| (375298) 2008 PP_{10} | 7 August 2008 | list |
| 375303 Ikerjiménez | 26 August 2008 | list |
| (375306) 2008 QT_{33} | 27 August 2008 | list |
| (375315) 2008 RG_{48} | 3 September 2008 | list |
| (375318) 2008 RO_{79} | 2 September 2008 | list |

| (375389) 2008 SP_{219} | 30 September 2008 | list |
| (375425) 2008 TT_{6} | 3 October 2008 | list |
| (375428) 2008 TM_{27} | 1 October 2008 | list |
| (375449) 2008 TL_{92} | 4 October 2008 | list |
| (375450) 2008 TA_{94} | 5 October 2008 | list |
| (375653) 2009 BJ_{60} | 16 January 2009 | list |
| (375685) 2009 JF | 2 May 2009 | list |
| (375692) 2009 MY_{8} | 28 June 2009 | list |
| (375694) 2009 OM_{4} | 19 July 2009 | list |
| (375696) 2009 OB_{5} | 19 July 2009 | list |
| (375697) 2009 OD_{21} | 27 July 2009 | list |
| (375702) 2009 PC_{4} | 14 August 2009 | list |
| (375703) 2009 PD_{5} | 15 August 2009 | list |
| (375715) 2009 QF_{19} | 18 August 2009 | list |
| (375716) 2009 QJ_{20} | 19 August 2009 | list |
| (375717) 2009 QO_{20} | 19 August 2009 | list |
| (375718) 2009 QU_{20} | 19 August 2009 | list |
| (375719) 2009 QK_{21} | 19 August 2009 | list |
| (375720) 2009 QF_{23} | 16 August 2009 | list |
| (375724) 2009 QO_{40} | 26 August 2009 | list |
| (375727) 2009 QD_{47} | 28 August 2009 | list |
| (375728) 2009 QM_{47} | 28 August 2009 | list |
| (375729) 2009 QT_{56} | 16 August 2009 | list |
| (375806) 2009 TE_{22} | 12 October 2009 | list |
| (375807) 2009 TV_{36} | 15 October 2009 | list |

| (375808) 2009 TR_{38} | 15 October 2009 | list |
| (375837) 2009 UR_{123} | 18 October 2009 | list |
| (375877) 2009 VY_{57} | 12 November 2009 | list |
| (376030) 2010 CA_{20} | 6 February 2010 | list |
| (376100) 2010 VB_{192} | 4 November 2010 | list |
| (376693) 2013 QH_{79} | 21 July 2009 | list |
| (378708) 2008 PD_{13} | 10 August 2008 | list |
| (378710) 2008 PN_{15} | 7 August 2008 | list |
| (378716) 2008 QK_{1} | 23 August 2008 | list |
| (378718) 2008 QH_{9} | 25 August 2008 | list |
| (378722) 2008 QG_{17} | 27 August 2008 | list |
| (378725) 2008 QS_{26} | 29 August 2008 | list |
| (378726) 2008 QL_{28} | 30 August 2008 | list |
| (379100) 2008 YQ_{7} | 20 December 2008 | list |
| (379106) 2008 YW_{23} | 21 December 2008 | list |
| (379134) 2009 CJ_{53} | 13 February 2009 | list |
| (379146) 2009 OM | 16 July 2009 | list |
| (379149) 2009 PH_{10} | 15 August 2009 | list |
| (379154) 2009 QU_{4} | 16 August 2009 | list |
| (379160) 2009 QA_{17} | 17 August 2009 | list |
| (379163) 2009 QS_{22} | 20 August 2009 | list |
| (379181) 2009 RL_{19} | 14 September 2009 | list |
| (379258) 2009 UT_{16} | 17 October 2009 | list |
| (379302) 2009 VB_{76} | 13 November 2009 | list |
| (379347) 2009 WQ_{105} | 25 November 2009 | list |

| (379379) 2009 XT_{3} | 9 December 2009 | list |
| (380978) 2006 SY_{49} | 20 September 2006 | list |
| (381232) 2007 TD_{6} | 6 October 2007 | list |
| (381425) 2008 NB_{3} | 10 July 2008 | list |
| (381427) 2008 OD_{13} | 29 July 2008 | list |
| (381437) 2008 QN_{9} | 25 August 2008 | list |
| (381438) 2008 QR_{9} | 26 August 2008 | list |
| (381439) 2008 QS_{9} | 26 August 2008 | list |
| (381440) 2008 QP_{10} | 26 August 2008 | list |
| (381441) 2008 QP_{16} | 25 August 2008 | list |
| (381522) 2008 SV_{218} | 30 September 2008 | list |
| (381523) 2008 SB_{219} | 30 September 2008 | list |
| (381545) 2008 TW_{4} | 1 October 2008 | list |
| (381693) 2009 CH_{50} | 14 February 2009 | list |
| (381694) 2009 CS_{50} | 14 February 2009 | list |
| (381707) 2009 PL_{4} | 14 August 2009 | list |
| (381710) 2009 PL_{17} | 15 August 2009 | list |
| (381714) 2009 QU_{8} | 17 August 2009 | list |
| (381723) 2009 RL_{3} | 11 September 2009 | list |
| (381737) 2009 RU_{61} | 14 September 2009 | list |
| (381747) 2009 SX_{99} | 21 September 2009 | list |
| (381748) 2009 SU_{101} | 24 September 2009 | list |
| (381784) 2009 TZ_{4} | 10 October 2009 | list |
| (381788) 2009 TG_{34} | 11 October 2009 | list |
| (381789) 2009 TQ_{36} | 15 October 2009 | list |

| (381822) 2009 VC_{76} | 13 November 2009 | list |
| (381902) 2010 CV_{4} | 7 February 2010 | list |
| (383854) 2008 PA_{2} | 3 August 2008 | list |
| (383855) 2008 PO_{5} | 1 August 2008 | list |
| (383863) 2008 QO_{29} | 24 August 2008 | list |
| (383956) 2008 TA_{7} | 3 October 2008 | list |
| (383957) 2008 TE_{8} | 4 October 2008 | list |
| (384239) 2009 DM_{71} | 19 February 2009 | list |
| (384252) 2009 ES_{3} | 14 March 2009 | list |
| (384258) 2009 EG_{20} | 15 March 2009 | list |
| (384261) 2009 FF_{3} | 16 March 2009 | list |
| (384275) 2009 PO_{3} | 12 August 2009 | list |
| (384281) 2009 QC_{20} | 19 August 2009 | list |
| (384338) 2009 TR_{2} | 11 October 2009 | list |
| (384339) 2009 TM_{3} | 11 October 2009 | list |
| (384341) 2009 TC_{9} | 12 October 2009 | list |
| (384346) 2009 TO_{27} | 14 October 2009 | list |
| (384352) 2009 UX_{16} | 18 October 2009 | list |
| (384378) 2009 VS_{24} | 9 November 2009 | list |
| (384394) 2009 VR_{111} | 14 November 2009 | list |
| (384408) 2009 WH_{93} | 19 November 2009 | list |
| (384409) 2009 WK_{93} | 19 November 2009 | list |
| (384481) 2010 CR_{42} | 7 February 2010 | list |
| (384541) 2010 EU_{34} | 10 March 2010 | list |
| (384543) 2010 EM_{39} | 10 March 2010 | list |

| (384544) 2010 ER_{39} | 10 March 2010 | list |
| (384602) 2010 RM_{167} | 10 September 2010 | list |
| (386278) 2008 QN_{10} | 26 August 2008 | list |
| (386279) 2008 QR_{19} | 29 August 2008 | list |
| (386354) 2008 TM_{5} | 1 October 2008 | list |
| (386440) 2008 WD_{62} | 22 November 2008 | list |
| (386443) 2008 WQ_{90} | 22 November 2008 | list |
| (386467) 2008 YG_{23} | 19 December 2008 | list |
| (386482) 2008 YY_{167} | 30 December 2008 | list |
| (386548) 2009 DH_{16} | 17 February 2009 | list |
| (386582) 2009 FV_{18} | 20 March 2009 | list |
| (386608) 2009 HR_{36} | 20 April 2009 | list |
| (386654) 2009 TH_{3} | 10 October 2009 | list |
| (386655) 2009 TA_{7} | 12 October 2009 | list |
| (386658) 2009 UF_{12} | 17 October 2009 | list |
| (386676) 2009 VT_{43} | 10 November 2009 | list |
| (386677) 2009 VW_{43} | 11 November 2009 | list |
| (386680) 2009 VS_{57} | 12 November 2009 | list |
| (386685) 2009 VM_{75} | 12 November 2009 | list |
| (386686) 2009 VY_{80} | 10 November 2009 | list |
| (386787) 2010 ES_{35} | 10 March 2010 | list |
| (386798) 2010 EM_{113} | 14 March 2010 | list |
| (388554) 2007 NA_{1} | 11 July 2007 | list |
| (388618) 2007 TS_{18} | 8 October 2007 | list |
| (388708) 2007 VV_{84} | 8 November 2007 | list |

| (388749) 2007 WU | 17 November 2007 | list |
| (388806) 2008 BT_{24} | 30 January 2008 | list |
| (388866) 2008 QB_{11} | 26 August 2008 | list |
| (388867) 2008 QC_{13} | 27 August 2008 | list |
| (388946) 2008 TO_{4} | 1 October 2008 | list |
| (388947) 2008 TU_{4} | 1 October 2008 | list |
| (388966) 2008 TY_{93} | 5 October 2008 | list |
| (389082) 2008 WC_{133} | 28 November 2008 | list |
| (389234) 2009 ED_{21} | 15 March 2009 | list |
| (389279) 2009 HY_{45} | 22 April 2009 | list |
| (389296) 2009 KL_{22} | 31 May 2009 | list |
| (389325) 2009 SW_{242} | 20 September 2009 | list |
| (389344) 2009 TX_{40} | 14 October 2009 | list |
| (389349) 2009 UW_{16} | 18 October 2009 | list |
| (389367) 2009 VE_{44} | 12 November 2009 | list |
| (389395) 2009 XA_{3} | 8 December 2009 | list |
| (389465) 2010 EY_{39} | 11 March 2010 | list |
| (389467) 2010 EU_{42} | 9 March 2010 | list |
| (391779) 2008 PM_{7} | 5 August 2008 | list |
| (391781) 2008 PH_{16} | 6 August 2008 | list |
| (391783) 2008 QY_{5} | 26 August 2008 | list |
| (391870) 2008 TO_{92} | 4 October 2008 | list |
| (391882) 2008 TT_{180} | 4 October 2008 | list |
| (391951) 2008 WK_{10} | 18 November 2008 | list |
| (391963) 2008 WE_{101} | 26 November 2008 | list |

| 392070 Siurell | 14 February 2009 | list |
| (392106) 2009 EA_{4} | 15 March 2009 | list |
| (392109) 2009 EN_{20} | 15 March 2009 | list |
| (392116) 2009 FW_{17} | 18 March 2009 | list |
| (392164) 2009 JT_{1} | 6 May 2009 | list |
| (392230) 2009 VG_{44} | 13 November 2009 | list |
| (392319) 2010 EB_{36} | 11 March 2010 | list |
| (392355) 2010 GX_{28} | 8 April 2010 | list |
| (392406) 2010 LQ_{67} | 6 June 2010 | list |
| (395028) 2009 CG_{50} | 14 February 2009 | list |
| (395029) 2009 DN_{16} | 17 February 2009 | list |
| (395068) 2009 FQ_{75} | 21 March 2009 | list |
| (395084) 2009 HC_{91} | 22 April 2009 | list |
| (395102) 2009 QV_{57} | 29 August 2009 | list |
| (395113) 2009 VB_{50} | 11 November 2009 | list |
| (395176) 2010 ED_{70} | 10 March 2010 | list |
| (395180) 2010 EM_{100} | 14 March 2010 | list |
| (395191) 2010 GL_{32} | 8 April 2010 | list |
| (397479) 2007 QC_{2} | 18 August 2007 | list |
| (397599) 2007 VY_{83} | 5 November 2007 | list |
| (397799) 2008 PE_{5} | 4 August 2008 | list |
| 397800 Costaillobera | 4 August 2008 | list |
| (397922) 2008 WL_{10} | 18 November 2008 | list |
| (398093) 2009 QE_{5} | 16 August 2009 | list |
| (398108) 2009 SF_{243} | 24 September 2009 | list |

| (398146) 2010 ED_{36} | 11 March 2010 | list |
| (398147) 2010 EF_{36} | 11 March 2010 | list |
| (398216) 2010 NP_{117} | 13 July 2010 | list |
| (398228) 2010 PE_{73} | 3 August 2010 | list |
| (398237) 2010 RE_{54} | 4 September 2010 | list |
| (400411) 2008 CQ_{22} | 5 February 2008 | list |
| (400510) 2008 OA_{13} | 29 July 2008 | list |
| (400640) 2009 EJ_{20} | 15 March 2009 | list |
| (400661) 2009 HQ_{88} | 30 April 2009 | list |
| (400670) 2009 MD_{8} | 27 June 2009 | list |
| (400677) 2009 PF | 2 August 2009 | list |
| (400678) 2009 PG_{5} | 15 August 2009 | list |
| (400688) 2009 QS_{34} | 28 August 2009 | list |
| (400689) 2009 QD_{37} | 31 August 2009 | list |
| (400690) 2009 QM_{43} | 27 August 2009 | list |
| (400696) 2009 QH_{63} | 26 September 2009 | list |
| (400744) 2009 UL_{128} | 27 October 2009 | list |
| (400800) 2010 GT_{28} | 7 April 2010 | list |
| (400883) 2010 PF_{76} | 11 August 2010 | list |
| (400885) 2010 QV_{4} | 30 August 2010 | list |
| (400893) 2010 RF_{59} | 5 September 2010 | list |
| (402981) 2007 VF_{12} | 4 November 2007 | list |
| (403024) 2007 XU_{16} | 11 December 2007 | list |
| (403055) 2008 AR_{84} | 12 January 2008 | list |
| (403206) 2008 TA_{8} | 4 October 2008 | list |

| (403320) 2009 DS_{15} | 16 February 2009 | list |
| (403347) 2009 FS_{3} | 17 March 2009 | list |
| (403498) 2009 UA_{137} | 27 October 2009 | list |
| (406770) 2008 OJ | 25 July 2008 | list |
| (406775) 2008 PB_{2} | 3 August 2008 | list |
| (406777) 2008 QP_{29} | 24 August 2008 | list |
| (406889) 2009 DV_{16} | 18 February 2009 | list |
| (406911) 2009 EE_{21} | 15 March 2009 | list |
| (406920) 2009 FJ_{31} | 25 March 2009 | list |
| (406951) 2009 JP_{12} | 15 May 2009 | list |
| (407147) 2009 TL_{34} | 11 October 2009 | list |
| (407197) 2009 UX_{129} | 27 October 2009 | list |
| (407200) 2009 UF_{137} | 28 October 2009 | list |
| (407237) 2009 WW_{81} | 18 November 2009 | list |
| (407244) 2009 WN_{104} | 20 November 2009 | list |
| (407248) 2009 WB_{185} | 24 November 2009 | list |
| (407328) 2010 PL_{57} | 6 August 2010 | list |
| (407334) 2010 QF | 16 August 2010 | list |
| (407833) 2012 BJ_{24} | 22 January 2012 | list |
| (410391) 2007 WV | 17 November 2007 | list |
| (410416) 2008 AY_{31} | 12 January 2008 | list |
| (410614) 2008 OL_{11} | 31 July 2008 | list |
| (410615) 2008 OT_{13} | 29 July 2008 | list |
| (410618) 2008 PP_{5} | 1 August 2008 | list |
| (410621) 2008 PV_{21} | 2 August 2008 | list |

| (410624) 2008 QF_{34} | 29 August 2008 | list |
| (410669) 2008 ST_{219} | 30 September 2008 | list |
| (410782) 2009 FS_{31} | 20 March 2009 | list |
| (410807) 2009 KU_{4} | 17 May 2009 | list |
| (410820) 2009 OH_{5} | 25 July 2009 | list |
| (410821) 2009 OL_{6} | 26 July 2009 | list |
| (410824) 2009 OJ_{20} | 29 July 2009 | list |
| (410825) 2009 OL_{20} | 29 July 2009 | list |
| (410826) 2009 PE_{4} | 14 August 2009 | list |
| (410834) 2009 QB_{23} | 21 August 2009 | list |
| (410966) 2009 TK_{7} | 13 October 2009 | list |
| (410972) 2009 TB_{35} | 14 October 2009 | list |
| (410981) 2009 TE_{47} | 12 October 2009 | list |
| (410985) 2009 UQ_{15} | 17 October 2009 | list |
| (411055) 2009 VC_{44} | 12 November 2009 | list |
| (411059) 2009 VY_{49} | 11 November 2009 | list |
| (411060) 2009 VZ_{49} | 11 November 2009 | list |
| (411089) 2009 VJ_{111} | 11 November 2009 | list |
| (411122) 2009 WN_{155} | 20 November 2009 | list |
| (411194) 2010 JT_{171} | 5 May 2010 | list |
| (411231) 2010 PG_{57} | 3 August 2010 | list |
| (411239) 2010 QK_{6} | 20 August 2010 | list |
| (411611) 2011 QF_{14} | 22 August 2011 | list |
| (414029) 2007 OK_{1} | 16 July 2007 | list |
| (414285) 2008 OY | 26 July 2008 | list |

| (414288) 2008 OD_{16} | 28 July 2008 | list |
| (414289) 2008 PU_{7} | 5 August 2008 | list |
| (414290) 2008 PY_{14} | 10 August 2008 | list |
| (414294) 2008 QC_{12} | 25 August 2008 | list |
| (414321) 2008 RA_{141} | 3 September 2008 | list |
| (414337) 2008 SC_{218} | 29 September 2008 | list |
| (414349) 2008 TQ_{8} | 5 October 2008 | list |
| (414431) 2009 DP_{71} | 19 February 2009 | list |
| (414442) 2009 EK_{20} | 15 March 2009 | list |
| (414461) 2009 HC_{45} | 21 April 2009 | list |
| (414462) 2009 HB_{46} | 22 April 2009 | list |
| (414471) 2009 OP_{2} | 19 July 2009 | list |
| (414473) 2009 OQ_{4} | 20 July 2009 | list |
| (414477) 2009 PH_{2} | 12 August 2009 | list |
| (414492) 2009 RK_{7} | 10 September 2009 | list |
| (414582) 2009 TB_{9} | 12 October 2009 | list |
| (414722) 2009 XP_{3} | 9 December 2009 | list |
| (414725) 2009 XP_{11} | 10 December 2009 | list |
| (414783) 2010 QD_{4} | 20 August 2010 | list |
| (418105) 2007 XJ_{25} | 15 December 2007 | list |
| (418428) 2008 OF_{11} | 31 July 2008 | list |
| (418436) 2008 PG_{10} | 5 August 2008 | list |
| (418441) 2008 QS_{8} | 25 August 2008 | list |
| (418443) 2008 QC_{18} | 28 August 2008 | list |
| (418446) 2008 QA_{34} | 29 August 2008 | list |

| (418586) 2008 SP_{218} | 30 September 2008 | list |
| (418619) 2008 TW_{5} | 3 October 2008 | list |
| (418620) 2008 TS_{7} | 3 October 2008 | list |
| (418656) 2008 TN_{91} | 4 October 2008 | list |
| (418800) 2008 VT_{14} | 9 November 2008 | list |
| (418926) 2009 CG_{51} | 14 February 2009 | list |
| (418953) 2009 FN_{24} | 20 March 2009 | list |
| (418994) 2009 NG | 4 July 2009 | list |
| (418995) 2009 OP | 16 July 2009 | list |
| (418996) 2009 OH_{10} | 29 July 2009 | list |
| (419004) 2009 PG_{2} | 12 August 2009 | list |
| (419011) 2009 PB_{17} | 15 August 2009 | list |
| (419020) 2009 QH_{22} | 20 August 2009 | list |
| (419021) 2009 QR_{22} | 20 August 2009 | list |
| (419026) 2009 QJ_{40} | 26 August 2009 | list |
| (419027) 2009 QP_{47} | 28 August 2009 | list |
| (419028) 2009 QY_{48} | 28 August 2009 | list |
| (419036) 2009 QF_{64} | 19 August 2009 | list |
| (419111) 2009 SX_{188} | 21 September 2009 | list |
| (419131) 2009 SZ_{242} | 21 September 2009 | list |
| (419166) 2009 TB_{5} | 10 October 2009 | list |
| (419168) 2009 TV_{5} | 11 October 2009 | list |
| (419176) 2009 TH_{33} | 12 October 2009 | list |
| (419177) 2009 TK_{33} | 14 October 2009 | list |
| (419213) 2009 UB_{130} | 29 October 2009 | list |

| (419219) 2009 UB_{150} | 27 October 2009 | list |
| (419245) 2009 VS_{50} | 15 November 2009 | list |
| (419301) 2009 WG_{47} | 18 November 2009 | list |
| (419367) 2009 XQ_{3} | 9 December 2009 | list |
| (419451) 2010 CJ_{129} | 11 February 2010 | list |
| (419464) 2010 CC_{180} | 12 February 2010 | list |
| (419498) 2010 ES_{126} | 15 March 2010 | list |
| (419534) 2010 KT_{117} | 17 May 2010 | list |
| (419556) 2010 PO_{73} | 7 August 2010 | list |
| (419559) 2010 QA_{1} | 16 August 2010 | list |
| 424200 Tonicelia | 12 July 2007 | list |
| (424388) 2007 XY_{15} | 8 December 2007 | list |
| (424645) 2008 OV_{9} | 31 July 2008 | list |
| (424647) 2008 PY_{6} | 5 August 2008 | list |
| (424651) 2008 QX_{12} | 26 August 2008 | list |
| (424904) 2008 WG_{62} | 23 November 2008 | list |
| (425041) 2009 OF_{9} | 28 July 2009 | list |
| (425043) 2009 PE_{3} | 12 August 2009 | list |
| (425049) 2009 QS_{21} | 19 August 2009 | list |
| (425053) 2009 QM_{33} | 24 August 2009 | list |
| (425122) 2009 SD_{189} | 22 September 2009 | list |
| (425165) 2009 TK_{9} | 14 October 2009 | list |
| (425247) 2009 WP_{50} | 19 November 2009 | list |
| (425291) 2009 WK_{213} | 18 November 2009 | list |
| (425297) 2009 XR_{3} | 9 December 2009 | list |

| (425450) 2010 EV_{45} | 15 March 2010 | list |
| (425491) 2010 GL_{25} | 8 April 2010 | list |
| (426071) 2012 CD_{29} | 13 February 2012 | list |
| (428698) 2008 QG_{1} | 23 August 2008 | list |
| (428699) 2008 QG_{2} | 24 August 2008 | list |
| (428701) 2008 QU_{24} | 30 August 2008 | list |
| (428800) 2008 TM_{2} | 4 October 2008 | list |
| (428820) 2008 TD_{91} | 3 October 2008 | list |
| (429079) 2009 QK_{23} | 16 August 2009 | list |
| (429118) 2009 SC_{243} | 21 September 2009 | list |
| (429137) 2009 TA_{9} | 12 October 2009 | list |
| (429140) 2009 TW_{46} | 13 October 2009 | list |
| (429175) 2009 VR_{75} | 13 November 2009 | list |
| (431575) 2007 VV_{4} | 4 November 2007 | list |
| (431599) 2007 VV_{189} | 14 November 2007 | list |
| (431650) 2008 BY_{18} | 29 January 2008 | list |
| (431795) 2008 QW_{15} | 28 August 2008 | list |
| (431883) 2008 SE_{218} | 30 September 2008 | list |
| (431901) 2008 TN_{2} | 3 October 2008 | list |
| (431902) 2008 TO_{5} | 1 October 2008 | list |
| (431904) 2008 TR_{8} | 5 October 2008 | list |
| (431924) 2008 TM_{91} | 4 October 2008 | list |
| (432042) 2008 WD_{103} | 27 November 2008 | list |
| (432206) 2009 DR_{107} | 23 February 2009 | list |
| (432218) 2009 FN_{41} | 22 March 2009 | list |

| (432236) 2009 NO_{1} | 15 July 2009 | list |
| (432246) 2009 QZ_{41} | 26 August 2009 | list |
| (432249) 2009 RK | 9 September 2009 | list |
| (432308) 2009 TQ_{3} | 11 October 2009 | list |
| (432313) 2009 TJ_{20} | 11 October 2009 | list |
| (435163) 2007 OJ | 17 July 2007 | list |
| (435177) 2007 RV_{7} | 5 September 2007 | list |
| (435381) 2007 XA_{16} | 8 December 2007 | list |
| (435539) 2008 OV | 25 July 2008 | list |
| (435556) 2008 QB_{40} | 27 August 2008 | list |
| (435557) 2008 QG_{48} | 27 August 2008 | list |
| (435671) 2008 TP_{2} | 4 October 2008 | list |
| (435969) 2009 DB_{71} | 17 February 2009 | list |
| (436037) 2009 NJ | 11 July 2009 | list |
| (436038) 2009 OR_{9} | 27 July 2009 | list |
| (436047) 2009 QM_{21} | 19 August 2009 | list |
| (436050) 2009 QO_{42} | 26 August 2009 | list |
| (436051) 2009 QW_{45} | 26 August 2009 | list |
| (436115) 2009 TZ_{1} | 10 October 2009 | list |
| (436118) 2009 TU_{14} | 13 October 2009 | list |
| (436119) 2009 TX_{20} | 11 October 2009 | list |
| (436121) 2009 TV_{22} | 14 October 2009 | list |
| (436126) 2009 TE_{34} | 10 October 2009 | list |
| (436127) 2009 TW_{36} | 15 October 2009 | list |
| (436161) 2009 VA_{50} | 11 November 2009 | list |

| (436172) 2009 VG_{110} | 9 November 2009 | list |
| (436376) 2010 OG_{101} | 17 July 2010 | list |
| (436654) 2011 RR_{12} | 8 September 2011 | list |
| (438423) 2006 VZ_{94} | 14 November 2006 | list |
| (438696) 2008 QF_{26} | 29 August 2008 | list |
| (438733) 2008 TO_{7} | 3 October 2008 | list |
| (438740) 2008 TY_{94} | 5 October 2008 | list |
| (438891) 2009 TZ_{34} | 14 October 2009 | list |
| (438908) 2009 XO | 9 December 2009 | list |
| (441064) 2007 RF_{9} | 7 September 2007 | list |
| (441106) 2007 TF_{4} | 6 October 2007 | list |
| (441454) 2008 OS_{2} | 27 July 2008 | list |
| (441466) 2008 QD_{34} | 29 August 2008 | list |
| (441525) 2008 SK_{220} | 30 September 2008 | list |
| (441540) 2008 TF_{5} | 1 October 2008 | list |
| (441659) 2008 WV_{95} | 24 November 2008 | list |
| (441755) 2009 CU_{5} | 14 February 2009 | list |
| (441765) 2009 CJ_{50} | 14 February 2009 | list |
| (441818) 2009 MW_{8} | 28 June 2009 | list |
| (441820) 2009 OD_{10} | 29 July 2009 | list |
| (441928) 2010 JT_{31} | 5 May 2010 | list |
| (442057) 2010 RC_{62} | 7 September 2010 | list |
| (444480) 2006 QL_{89} | 28 August 2006 | list |
| (444891) 2007 XX_{15} | 8 December 2007 | list |
| (445077) 2008 TJ_{27} | 1 October 2008 | list |

| (445155) 2008 YS_{7} | 21 December 2008 | list |
| (445242) 2009 OY_{5} | 16 July 2009 | list |
| (445250) 2009 QR_{46} | 27 August 2009 | list |
| (445371) 2010 PU_{26} | 7 August 2010 | list |
| (447794) 2007 TZ_{6} | 6 October 2007 | list |
| (447904) 2007 XL_{20} | 12 December 2007 | list |
| (447917) 2007 YT_{47} | 30 December 2007 | list |
| (447960) 2008 BU_{40} | 29 January 2008 | list |
| (448109) 2008 NZ_{1} | 7 July 2008 | list |
| (448113) 2008 PR_{7} | 5 August 2008 | list |
| (448114) 2008 PD_{15} | 10 August 2008 | list |
| (448116) 2008 QG_{12} | 25 August 2008 | list |
| (448337) 2009 FA_{24} | 18 March 2009 | list |
| (448338) 2009 FP_{24} | 20 March 2009 | list |
| (448371) 2009 JK_{12} | 15 May 2009 | list |
| (448372) 2009 KJ_{1} | 18 May 2009 | list |
| (448395) 2009 QM_{45} | 28 August 2009 | list |
| (448396) 2009 QN_{45} | 28 August 2009 | list |
| (448398) 2009 RD_{3} | 10 September 2009 | list |
| (448420) 2009 SZ_{220} | 25 September 2009 | list |
| (450967) 2008 PW_{8} | 6 August 2008 | list |
| (450998) 2008 TV_{91} | 4 October 2008 | list |
| (451059) 2008 YS_{133} | 30 December 2008 | list |
| (451110) 2009 FG_{24} | 20 March 2009 | list |
| (451111) 2009 FG_{41} | 21 March 2009 | list |

| (451119) 2009 HP_{82} | 22 April 2009 | list |
| (451130) 2009 NB | 2 July 2009 | list |
| (451137) 2009 QJ_{31} | 20 August 2009 | list |
| (451269) 2010 PS_{23} | 2 August 2010 | list |
| (451940) 2014 MX_{6} | 5 September 2010 | list |
| (453108) 2007 XN_{18} | 12 December 2007 | list |
| (453109) 2007 XV_{20} | 12 December 2007 | list |
| (453127) 2008 AP_{2} | 6 January 2008 | list |
| (453237) 2008 QP_{13} | 27 August 2008 | list |
| (453285) 2008 TH_{91} | 3 October 2008 | list |
| (453392) 2009 CB_{51} | 14 February 2009 | list |
| (453415) 2009 HO_{57} | 23 April 2009 | list |
| (453478) 2009 SQ_{225} | 25 September 2009 | list |
| (453516) 2009 UD_{130} | 29 October 2009 | list |
| (453622) 2010 RS_{39} | 2 September 2010 | list |
| (457246) 2008 PV_{1} | 1 August 2008 | list |
| (457252) 2008 QQ_{28} | 31 August 2008 | list |
| (457665) 2009 DO_{15} | 16 February 2009 | list |
| (457693) 2009 EL_{4} | 15 March 2009 | list |
| (457703) 2009 FP_{1} | 16 March 2009 | list |
| (457721) 2009 FT_{60} | 21 March 2009 | list |
| (457757) 2009 HP_{88} | 30 April 2009 | list |
| (457766) 2009 KT_{2} | 20 May 2009 | list |
| (457775) 2009 MG_{8} | 28 June 2009 | list |
| (457777) 2009 OA_{1} | 19 July 2009 | list |

| (457778) 2009 OQ_{3} | 22 July 2009 | list |
| (457779) 2009 OE_{21} | 29 July 2009 | list |
| (457784) 2009 PL_{10} | 15 August 2009 | list |
| (457790) 2009 QE_{20} | 19 August 2009 | list |
| (457791) 2009 QM_{23} | 16 August 2009 | list |
| (457795) 2009 QX_{30} | 24 August 2009 | list |
| (457796) 2009 QB_{33} | 18 August 2009 | list |
| (457910) 2009 UH_{16} | 18 October 2009 | list |
| (457925) 2009 UJ_{90} | 26 October 2009 | list |
| (458093) 2010 AU_{91} | 10 March 2010 | list |
| (458114) 2010 CC_{128} | 7 February 2010 | list |
| (458127) 2010 EM_{137} | 15 March 2010 | list |
| (458204) 2010 RG_{53} | 7 September 2010 | list |
| (458213) 2010 RP_{79} | 3 September 2010 | list |
| (462339) 2008 NV_{3} | 12 July 2008 | list |
| (462341) 2008 PY_{4} | 4 August 2008 | list |
| (462344) 2008 QA_{13} | 26 August 2008 | list |
| (462345) 2008 QQ_{17} | 27 August 2008 | list |
| (462346) 2008 QD_{26} | 29 August 2008 | list |
| (462411) 2008 TL_{4} | 1 October 2008 | list |
| (462412) 2008 TR_{4} | 1 October 2008 | list |
| (462413) 2008 TH_{5} | 1 October 2008 | list |
| (462578) 2009 EX_{3} | 15 March 2009 | list |
| (462589) 2009 FE_{72} | 17 March 2009 | list |
| (462613) 2009 MZ_{7} | 26 June 2009 | list |

| (462617) 2009 PK_{2} | 12 August 2009 | list |
| (462625) 2009 QZ_{19} | 19 August 2009 | list |
| (462674) 2009 UG_{23} | 17 October 2009 | list |
| (462802) 2010 PR_{74} | 11 August 2010 | list |
| (462805) 2010 QR_{3} | 16 August 2010 | list |
| (462811) 2010 RY_{71} | 10 September 2010 | list |
| (465277) 2007 TV_{172} | 13 October 2007 | list |
| (465365) 2008 BD_{24} | 31 January 2008 | list |
| (465422) 2008 PL_{2} | 2 August 2008 | list |
| (465443) 2008 RS_{134} | 6 September 2008 | list |
| (465702) 2009 TN_{22} | 13 October 2009 | list |
| (465705) 2009 TN_{35} | 14 October 2009 | list |
| (465741) 2009 VR_{72} | 22 October 2009 | list |
| (465755) 2009 WG_{50} | 19 November 2009 | list |
| (465760) 2009 WE_{105} | 23 November 2009 | list |
| (465857) 2010 RW_{77} | 7 September 2010 | list |
| (467631) 2008 PY_{17} | 13 August 2008 | list |
| (467632) 2008 QB_{28} | 30 August 2008 | list |
| (467749) 2009 SC_{189} | 21 September 2009 | list |
| (467825) 2010 NO_{117} | 10 July 2010 | list |
| (467831) 2010 RF_{40} | 4 September 2010 | list |
| (468629) 2008 PH_{10} | 5 August 2008 | list |
| (468684) 2009 QY_{33} | 27 August 2009 | list |
| (470327) 2007 RQ_{7} | 5 September 2007 | list |
| (470605) 2008 QF_{43} | 28 August 2008 | list |

| (470608) 2008 RB_{28} | 1 September 2008 | list |
| (470927) 2009 FZ | 16 March 2009 | list |
| (470928) 2009 FM_{2} | 17 March 2009 | list |
| (470962) 2009 QZ_{24} | 17 August 2009 | list |
| (470976) 2009 SU_{17} | 17 September 2009 | list |
| (471007) 2009 SZ_{243} | 25 September 2009 | list |
| (471028) 2009 SO_{329} | 17 September 2009 | list |
| (471036) 2009 TR_{14} | 12 October 2009 | list |
| (471037) 2009 TO_{20} | 11 October 2009 | list |
| (471038) 2009 TH_{22} | 13 October 2009 | list |
| (471040) 2009 TR_{26} | 14 October 2009 | list |
| (471068) 2009 VO_{92} | 12 November 2009 | list |
| (476288) 2007 VM_{244} | 15 November 2007 | list |
| (476320) 2007 YE_{2} | 16 December 2007 | list |
| (476560) 2008 OP_{12} | 28 July 2008 | list |
| (476661) 2008 TB_{8} | 4 October 2008 | list |
| (476662) 2008 TH_{8} | 4 October 2008 | list |
| (476914) 2008 WJ_{61} | 23 November 2008 | list |
| (477140) 2009 DA_{17} | 19 February 2009 | list |
| (477145) 2009 DQ_{41} | 18 February 2009 | list |
| (477228) 2009 QG_{42} | 26 August 2009 | list |
| (477326) 2009 TQ_{7} | 13 October 2009 | list |
| (477329) 2009 TG_{21} | 11 October 2009 | list |
| (477359) 2009 UV_{91} | 18 October 2009 | list |
| (477399) 2009 VL_{57} | 12 November 2009 | list |

| (477418) 2009 WE_{35} | 16 November 2009 | list |
| (477531) 2010 EZ_{87} | 14 March 2010 | list |
| (477684) 2010 RP_{37} | 4 September 2010 | list |
| (477702) 2010 RA_{141} | 13 September 2010 | list |
| (480243) 2015 HA_{29} | 15 October 2009 | list |
| (481538) 2007 OP_{4} | 23 July 2007 | list |
| (481844) 2008 WH_{94} | 26 November 2008 | list |
| (481946) 2009 CM_{50} | 14 February 2009 | list |
| (481949) 2009 DV_{9} | 19 February 2009 | list |
| (481969) 2009 EM_{20} | 15 March 2009 | list |
| (481991) 2009 QX_{60} | 26 August 2009 | list |
| (482012) 2009 TB_{21} | 11 October 2009 | list |
| (482013) 2009 TN_{36} | 14 October 2009 | list |
| (482796) 2013 QJ_{10} | 24 August 2013 | list |
| (484401) 2007 XW_{15} | 8 December 2007 | list |
| (484572) 2008 OK | 25 July 2008 | list |
| (484574) 2008 QK_{13} | 27 August 2008 | list |
| (484576) 2008 QS_{16} | 26 August 2008 | list |
| (484580) 2008 QA_{26} | 9 August 2008 | list |
| (484581) 2008 QX_{27} | 30 August 2008 | list |
| (484583) 2008 QR_{42} | 29 August 2008 | list |
| (484589) 2008 RW_{21} | 2 September 2008 | list |
| (484590) 2008 RU_{23} | 26 August 2008 | list |
| (484797) 2009 DU_{77} | 24 February 2009 | list |
| (484814) 2009 FS_{1} | 17 March 2009 | list |

| (484815) 2009 FC_{25} | 22 March 2009 | list |
| (484866) 2009 ON | 16 July 2009 | list |
| (484867) 2009 OD_{6} | 19 July 2009 | list |
| (484868) 2009 OP_{8} | 25 July 2009 | list |
| (484876) 2009 PF_{4} | 14 August 2009 | list |
| (484882) 2009 QQ_{31} | 21 August 2009 | list |
| (484883) 2009 QH_{33} | 24 August 2009 | list |
| (484884) 2009 QT_{34} | 28 August 2009 | list |
| (484885) 2009 QT_{40} | 26 August 2009 | list |
| (484886) 2009 QK_{41} | 20 August 2009 | list |
| (484887) 2009 QH_{42} | 26 August 2009 | list |
| (484888) 2009 QY_{46} | 28 August 2009 | list |
| (484889) 2009 QE_{48} | 28 August 2009 | list |
| (484890) 2009 QR_{56} | 27 August 2009 | list |
| (484892) 2009 QG_{59} | 29 August 2009 | list |
| (484895) 2009 QE_{64} | 19 August 2009 | list |
| (484896) 2009 RC_{1} | 29 August 2009 | list |
| (484898) 2009 RL_{7} | 10 September 2009 | list |
| (484925) 2009 SB_{103} | 25 September 2009 | list |
| (484926) 2009 SV_{108} | 17 September 2009 | list |
| (484934) 2009 SA_{150} | 29 August 2009 | list |
| (484955) 2009 SC_{337} | 25 September 2009 | list |
| (484960) 2009 TU_{6} | 12 October 2009 | list |
| (484961) 2009 TC_{7} | 12 October 2009 | list |
| (484962) 2009 TJ_{7} | 13 October 2009 | list |

| (484965) 2009 TF_{17} | 15 October 2009 | list |
| (484967) 2009 TN_{20} | 11 October 2009 | list |
| (484970) 2009 TV_{37} | 12 October 2009 | list |
| (484973) 2009 TK_{39} | 15 October 2009 | list |
| (484991) 2009 UG_{140} | 18 October 2009 | list |
| (484994) 2009 VN | 15 October 2009 | list |
| (485005) 2009 VG_{74} | 18 October 2009 | list |
| (485008) 2009 VR_{92} | 13 November 2009 | list |
| (485031) 2009 WC_{142} | 18 November 2009 | list |
| (485032) 2009 WD_{142} | 18 November 2009 | list |
| (485036) 2009 YT | 28 August 2009 | list |
| (485066) 2010 EX_{21} | 9 March 2010 | list |
| (485068) 2010 EY_{35} | 10 March 2010 | list |
| (485069) 2010 EV_{39} | 11 March 2010 | list |
| (485074) 2010 EB_{88} | 14 March 2010 | list |
| (485086) 2010 EM_{139} | 13 March 2010 | list |
| (485097) 2010 GJ_{32} | 7 April 2010 | list |
| (485132) 2010 NH_{3} | 12 July 2010 | list |
| (485138) 2010 OD | 16 July 2010 | list |
| (485145) 2010 OK_{101} | 20 July 2010 | list |
| (485147) 2010 PV_{23} | 16 July 2010 | list |
| (485151) 2010 PR_{63} | 4 August 2010 | list |
| (485157) 2010 RR_{32} | 16 August 2010 | list |
| (485161) 2010 RY_{69} | 7 September 2010 | list |
| (485162) 2010 RT_{77} | 6 September 2010 | list |

| (485168) 2010 RX_{127} | 7 September 2010 | list |
| (485171) 2010 RX_{165} | 10 September 2010 | list |
| (485172) 2010 RK_{167} | 6 September 2010 | list |
| (485177) 2010 SK_{23} | 5 September 2010 | list |
| (485179) 2010 SS_{35} | 30 September 2010 | list |
| (485184) 2010 TM_{19} | 8 October 2010 | list |
| (485219) 2010 UJ_{99} | 30 September 2010 | list |
| (485230) 2010 VE_{34} | 4 November 2010 | list |
| (485235) 2010 VL_{61} | 4 November 2010 | list |
| (485302) 2011 AN_{51} | 19 November 2009 | list |
| (485430) 2011 QR_{41} | 24 August 2011 | list |
| (485435) 2011 QG_{56} | 26 August 2011 | list |
| (485438) 2011 QC_{63} | 30 August 2011 | list |
| (485441) 2011 QY_{66} | 27 August 2011 | list |
| (485444) 2011 QS_{71} | 28 August 2011 | list |
| (485470) 2011 SC_{39} | 5 September 2011 | list |
| (485550) 2011 UH_{123} | 6 September 2011 | list |
| (485551) 2011 UW_{125} | 26 September 2011 | list |
| (485778) 2012 CJ_{45} | 25 August 2009 | list |
| (485783) 2012 DE_{6} | 18 February 2012 | list |
| (485785) 2012 DH_{11} | 14 September 2010 | list |
| (485805) 2012 DD_{40} | 1 October 2010 | list |
| (486004) 2012 OP_{5} | 12 November 2009 | list |
| (486020) 2012 SQ_{44} | 19 November 2009 | list |
| (486029) 2012 TO_{57} | 3 September 2008 | list |

| (486055) 2012 TT_{197} | 17 September 2012 | list |
| (486091) 2012 UC_{134} | 30 September 2008 | list |
| (486105) 2012 VD_{40} | 4 September 2008 | list |
| (486122) 2012 VA_{113} | 20 December 2008 | list |
| (486137) 2012 XC_{6} | 3 August 2008 | list |
| (486143) 2012 XY_{23} | 1 August 2008 | list |
| (486181) 2013 AW_{19} | 19 December 2008 | list |
| (486303) 2013 CP_{81} | 2 August 2010 | list |
| (486318) 2013 CU_{113} | 24 August 2011 | list |
| (486587) 2013 JK_{28} | 4 August 2008 | list |
| (486794) 2014 HQ_{156} | 24 August 2011 | list |
| (486823) 2014 JU_{25} | 1 August 2011 | list |
| (486923) 2014 MH_{15} | 12 September 2010 | list |
| (487012) 2014 OM_{3} | 16 August 2009 | list |
| (487182) 2014 OR_{327} | 20 August 2009 | list |
| (487218) 2014 ON_{386} | 29 August 2009 | list |
| (487262) 2014 PR_{37} | 11 August 2008 | list |
| (487408) 2014 QW_{367} | 1 September 2008 | list |
| (487495) 2014 SH_{285} | 10 August 2008 | list |
| (487513) 2014 TM_{47} | 9 August 2008 | list |
| (487520) 2014 UA_{28} | 17 July 2007 | list |
| (487525) 2014 UE_{93} | 30 August 2008 | list |
| (487540) 2014 UF_{189} | 13 October 2009 | list |
| (487653) 2015 OT_{75} | 1 August 2008 | list |
| (487702) 2015 RY_{24} | 29 August 2008 | list |

| (487734) 2015 RW_{101} | 25 August 2011 | list |
| (487802) 2015 SL_{5} | 23 August 2011 | list |
| (487852) 2015 TA_{104} | 24 July 2011 | list |
| (487917) 2015 TB_{196} | 16 August 2009 | list |
| (487966) 2015 TV_{298} | 13 September 2009 | list |
| (488077) 2015 VZ_{24} | 27 August 2009 | list |
| (488101) 2015 VU_{63} | 24 September 2009 | list |
| (488114) 2015 VD_{84} | 17 August 2009 | list |
| (488212) 2015 XB_{309} | 22 September 2009 | list |
| (488215) 2015 XA_{315} | 8 September 2010 | list |
| (489236) 2006 QQ_{89} | 28 August 2006 | list |
| (489738) 2007 XJ_{18} | 12 December 2007 | list |
| (489913) 2008 PG_{5} | 5 August 2008 | list |
| (489914) 2008 PU_{8} | 6 August 2008 | list |
| (489916) 2008 QF_{8} | 2 August 2008 | list |
| (489917) 2008 QH_{11} | 26 August 2008 | list |
| (489918) 2008 QO_{12} | 26 August 2008 | list |
| (489922) 2008 QB_{35} | 29 August 2008 | list |
| (489924) 2008 QX_{40} | 26 August 2008 | list |
| (489930) 2008 RP_{24} | 5 September 2008 | list |
| (489956) 2008 RC_{137} | 5 September 2008 | list |
| (489960) 2008 SG_{8} | 24 August 2008 | list |
| (490005) 2008 SL_{218} | 30 September 2008 | list |
| (490006) 2008 ST_{218} | 30 September 2008 | list |
| (490088) 2008 TD_{184} | 6 October 2008 | list |

| (490151) 2008 UW_{178} | 4 October 2008 | list |
| (490381) 2009 OE_{10} | 29 July 2009 | list |
| (490383) 2009 OK_{22} | 28 July 2009 | list |
| (490385) 2009 PO_{2} | 13 August 2009 | list |
| (490389) 2009 QK_{1} | 16 August 2009 | list |
| (490390) 2009 QA_{5} | 16 August 2009 | list |
| (490394) 2009 QN_{21} | 19 August 2009 | list |
| (490395) 2009 QE_{23} | 16 August 2009 | list |
| (490398) 2009 QS_{56} | 17 August 2009 | list |
| (490400) 2009 RA | 1 September 2009 | list |
| (490487) 2009 TM_{1} | 11 October 2009 | list |
| (490488) 2009 TR_{6} | 12 October 2009 | list |
| (490489) 2009 TM_{7} | 13 October 2009 | list |
| (490490) 2009 TA_{34} | 17 September 2009 | list |
| (490492) 2009 UA_{5} | 17 October 2009 | list |
| (490508) 2009 UD_{71} | 11 October 2009 | list |
| (490520) 2009 UA_{123} | 14 October 2009 | list |
| (490524) 2009 US_{139} | 27 October 2009 | list |
| (490528) 2009 UQ_{154} | 14 October 2009 | list |
| (490553) 2009 VB_{99} | 29 July 2008 | list |
| (490580) 2009 WL_{104} | 18 November 2009 | list |
| (490591) 2009 WG_{155} | 19 November 2009 | list |
| (490604) 2009 WT_{180} | 13 November 2009 | list |
| (490634) 2010 CA_{128} | 7 February 2010 | list |
| (490645) 2010 ER_{123} | 9 March 2010 | list |

| (490701) 2010 PH_{24} | 5 August 2010 | list |
| (490704) 2010 PP_{57} | 7 August 2010 | list |
| (490705) 2010 PT_{63} | 5 August 2010 | list |
| (490708) 2010 QZ_{2} | 20 August 2010 | list |
| (490714) 2010 RK_{40} | 5 September 2010 | list |
| (490716) 2010 RN_{68} | 6 September 2010 | list |
| (490744) 2010 SG_{37} | 4 September 2010 | list |
| (490755) 2010 TW_{150} | 8 September 2010 | list |
| (490796) 2010 VY_{29} | 2 November 2010 | list |
| (490901) 2011 BB_{105} | 6 August 2008 | list |
| (490954) 2011 DO_{12} | 16 November 2009 | list |
| (490978) 2011 EE_{73} | 12 July 2007 | list |
| (491037) 2011 QW_{11} | 23 August 2011 | list |
| (491038) 2011 QK_{14} | 21 August 2011 | list |
| (491041) 2011 QL_{21} | 4 August 2011 | list |
| (491044) 2011 QB_{27} | 21 August 2011 | list |
| (491051) 2011 QM_{49} | 22 August 2011 | list |
| (491059) 2011 QF_{66} | 24 August 2011 | list |
| (491063) 2011 QY_{72} | 31 August 2011 | list |
| (491071) 2011 QL_{95} | 24 August 2011 | list |
| (491083) 2011 SK_{3} | 17 September 2011 | list |
| (491095) 2011 SX_{23} | 20 September 2011 | list |
| (491098) 2011 SH_{27} | 25 August 2011 | list |
| (491099) 2011 SR_{27} | 18 September 2011 | list |
| (491123) 2011 SA_{110} | 25 August 2011 | list |
| (491168) 2011 TJ_{13} | 6 October 2011 | list |

| (491170) 2011 UW | 7 October 2011 | list |
| (491184) 2011 UY_{56} | 8 September 2011 | list |
| (491369) 2012 BG_{69} | 9 September 2010 | list |
| (491553) 2012 PA_{5} | 5 October 2008 | list |
| (491569) 2012 RO_{8} | 26 July 2008 | list |
| (491573) 2012 RJ_{12} | 12 September 2012 | list |
| (491846) 2013 AR_{67} | 20 December 2008 | list |
| (492113) 2013 KY_{17} | 17 June 2009 | list |
| (492132) 2013 MK_{9} | 10 October 2009 | list |
| (492192) 2013 RT_{29} | 19 July 2009 | list |
| (492218) 2013 SM_{85} | 20 August 2009 | list |
| (492238) 2013 TN_{101} | 27 August 2008 | list |
| (492320) 2014 BF_{47} | 3 September 2010 | list |
| (492342) 2014 GS_{44} | 22 August 2012 | list |
| (492446) 2014 MO_{46} | 18 November 2009 | list |
| (492479) 2014 NM_{44} | 1 October 2010 | list |
| (492616) 2014 ON_{231} | 7 August 2010 | list |
| (492755) 2014 QP_{167} | 5 August 2008 | list |
| (492921) 2014 RH_{21} | 15 August 2009 | list |
| (492984) 2014 SZ_{160} | 7 August 2010 | list |
| (493022) 2014 SO_{219} | 30 August 2008 | list |
| (493031) 2014 SJ_{229} | 5 September 2010 | list |
| (493517) 2015 DV_{12} | 15 August 2013 | list |
| (493837) 2015 VO_{141} | 17 September 2011 | list |
| (494225) 2016 NB_{21} | 22 August 2011 | list |
| (494310) 2016 SH_{18} | 8 July 2008 | list |

| (494479) 2016 WQ_{23} | 12 November 2009 | list |
| (494908) 2008 UA_{310} | 5 October 2008 | list |
| (494948) 2009 OE_{9} | 28 July 2009 | list |
| (494952) 2009 QX_{4} | 16 August 2009 | list |
| (495015) 2010 RP_{81} | 11 September 2010 | list |
| (495018) 2010 RA_{136} | 11 September 2010 | list |
| (495035) 2010 VR_{173} | 2 November 2010 | list |
| (495109) 2011 UF_{190} | 5 October 2011 | list |
| (495182) 2012 SX_{10} | 22 August 2012 | list |
| (495229) 2013 GJ_{130} | 2 August 2010 | list |
| (495280) 2013 RD_{45} | 26 November 2008 | list |
| (495962) 2007 RS_{6} | 4 September 2007 | list |
| (496019) 2008 ON_{11} | 31 July 2008 | list |
| (496021) 2008 QC_{2} | 24 August 2008 | list |
| (496028) 2008 SC_{9} | 24 August 2008 | list |
| (496067) 2009 QR_{41} | 22 August 2009 | list |
| (496076) 2009 SX_{13} | 17 September 2009 | list |
| (496081) 2009 SG_{103} | 25 September 2009 | list |
| (496087) 2009 ST_{162} | 28 August 2009 | list |
| (496090) 2009 SW_{220} | 24 September 2009 | list |
| (496095) 2009 TZ_{6} | 12 October 2009 | list |
| (496101) 2009 UW_{129} | 27 October 2009 | list |
| (496104) 2009 VR_{57} | 12 November 2009 | list |
| (496111) 2009 WU_{94} | 18 October 2009 | list |
| (496132) 2010 PW_{23} | 17 July 2010 | list |
| (496137) 2010 RU_{63} | 6 September 2010 | list |

| (496144) 2010 RM_{165} | 9 September 2010 | list |
| (496145) 2010 RF_{179} | 11 September 2010 | list |
| (496332) 2013 OC_{9} | 27 October 2009 | list |
| (496367) 2013 RH_{42} | 27 August 2008 | list |
| (496382) 2013 TK_{21} | 19 July 2009 | list |
| (496400) 2013 TR_{102} | 16 August 2009 | list |
| (496521) 2014 VG_{9} | 5 October 2010 | list |
| (496530) 2014 WB_{136} | 7 September 2010 | list |
| (498409) 2007 YD_{59} | 31 December 2007 | list |
| (498413) 2008 AO_{2} | 6 January 2008 | list |
| (498578) 2008 NX_{2} | 5 July 2008 | list |
| (498579) 2008 OM_{1} | 26 July 2008 | list |
| (498581) 2008 PA_{18} | 13 August 2008 | list |
| (498582) 2008 QA_{2} | 24 August 2008 | list |
| (498583) 2008 QT_{12} | 26 August 2008 | list |
| (498585) 2008 QV_{16} | 26 August 2008 | list |
| (498586) 2008 QC_{22} | 12 August 2008 | list |
| (498587) 2008 QS_{29} | 24 August 2008 | list |
| (498591) 2008 QJ_{40} | 29 August 2008 | list |
| (498592) 2008 QD_{45} | 26 August 2008 | list |
| (498605) 2008 RM_{47} | 2 August 2008 | list |
| (498639) 2008 SM_{15} | 28 August 2008 | list |
| (498844) 2008 WP_{98} | 22 November 2008 | list |
| (499013) 2009 CW_{50} | 14 February 2009 | list |
| (499087) 2009 FR_{18} | 19 March 2009 | list |

| (499090) 2009 FV_{38} | 17 March 2009 | list |
| (499133) 2009 QA_{22} | 20 August 2009 | list |
| (499135) 2009 QC_{33} | 18 August 2009 | list |
| (499139) 2009 QT_{62} | 26 August 2009 | list |
| (499140) 2009 RL_{1} | 10 September 2009 | list |
| (499171) 2009 SD_{103} | 25 September 2009 | list |
| (499172) 2009 SY_{103} | 25 September 2009 | list |
| (499203) 2009 TM_{44} | 15 October 2009 | list |
| (499207) 2009 UY_{15} | 18 October 2009 | list |
| (499226) 2009 UH_{91} | 18 October 2009 | list |
| (499240) 2009 UE_{141} | 27 October 2009 | list |
| (499265) 2009 VQ_{39} | 11 November 2009 | list |
| (499281) 2009 VS_{75} | 13 November 2009 | list |
| (499282) 2009 VX_{75} | 28 October 2009 | list |
| (499292) 2009 WR_{5} | 16 November 2009 | list |
| (499415) 2010 CQ_{42} | 6 February 2010 | list |
| (499445) 2010 EC_{36} | 11 March 2010 | list |
| (499456) 2010 EG_{106} | 15 March 2010 | list |
| (499516) 2010 PU_{24} | 7 August 2010 | list |
| (499517) 2010 PX_{24} | 7 August 2010 | list |
| (499523) 2010 PV_{74} | 11 August 2010 | list |
| (499524) 2010 PZ_{76} | 11 August 2010 | list |
| (499530) 2010 RZ_{54} | 5 September 2010 | list |
| (499536) 2010 RW_{88} | 4 September 2010 | list |
| (499542) 2010 RL_{110} | 10 September 2010 | list |

| (499578) 2010 TR_{2} | 2 October 2010 | list |
| (499629) 2010 UU_{87} | 2 October 2010 | list |
| (499820) 2011 DF_{11} | 25 February 2011 | list |

== See also ==
- List of minor planet discoverers § Discovering dedicated institutions
- Miguel Hurtado
- Observatorio Astronómico de La Sagra
- Consell Observatory
