= List of minor planets: 492001–493000 =

The following is a partial list of minor planets, running from minor-planet number 492001 through 493000, inclusive. The primary data for this and other partial lists is based on JPL's "Small-Body Orbital Elements" and data available from the Minor Planet Center. Critical list information is also provided by the MPC, unless otherwise specified from Lowell Observatory. A detailed description of the table's columns and additional sources are given on the main page including a complete list of every page in this series, and a statistical break-up on the dynamical classification of minor planets.

Also see the summary list of all named bodies in numerical and alphabetical order, and the corresponding naming citations for the number range of this particular list. New namings may only be added to this list after official publication, as the preannouncement of names is condemned by the Working Group for Small Bodies Nomenclature of the International Astronomical Union.

Near-Earth obj.	MBA (inner)	MBA (outer)	Centaur
Mars-crosser	MBA (middle)	Jupiter trojan	Trans-Neptunian obj.
Unclassified

== 492001–492100 ==
Designation			Discovery			Properties		Ref
Permanent	Provisional	Named after	Date	Site	Discoverer(s)	Category	Diam.	Ref
492001	2013 EH_{111}	—	March 2, 2009	Mount Lemmon	Mount Lemmon Survey	·	1.2 km	MPC · JPL
492002	2013 EB_{117}	—	January 29, 2009	Kitt Peak	Spacewatch	·	960 m	MPC · JPL
492003	2013 ES_{122}	—	September 12, 2007	Mount Lemmon	Mount Lemmon Survey	·	1.0 km	MPC · JPL
492004	2013 FT_{4}	—	March 13, 2013	Kitt Peak	Spacewatch	NYS	1.1 km	MPC · JPL
492005	2013 FK_{6}	—	October 25, 2011	Haleakala	Pan-STARRS 1	·	1.4 km	MPC · JPL
492006	2013 FT_{8}	—	February 4, 2005	Mount Lemmon	Mount Lemmon Survey	NYS	990 m	MPC · JPL
492007	2013 FE_{10}	—	September 10, 2007	Mount Lemmon	Mount Lemmon Survey	·	1.2 km	MPC · JPL
492008	2013 FE_{13}	—	September 24, 2011	Haleakala	Pan-STARRS 1	V	620 m	MPC · JPL
492009	2013 FG_{16}	—	March 9, 2005	Mount Lemmon	Mount Lemmon Survey	·	1.2 km	MPC · JPL
492010	2013 FM_{18}	—	October 25, 2011	Haleakala	Pan-STARRS 1	·	1.6 km	MPC · JPL
492011	2013 FA_{23}	—	February 1, 2009	Kitt Peak	Spacewatch	MAS	660 m	MPC · JPL
492012	2013 FD_{23}	—	March 13, 2013	Haleakala	Pan-STARRS 1	V	650 m	MPC · JPL
492013	2013 FT_{24}	—	March 17, 2009	Kitt Peak	Spacewatch	·	1.0 km	MPC · JPL
492014	2013 FN_{27}	—	March 7, 2013	Kitt Peak	Spacewatch	·	970 m	MPC · JPL
492015	2013 GU	—	September 30, 2006	Catalina	CSS	·	2.0 km	MPC · JPL
492016	2013 GS_{10}	—	March 7, 2013	Kitt Peak	Spacewatch	·	1.1 km	MPC · JPL
492017	2013 GC_{13}	—	March 13, 2013	Kitt Peak	Spacewatch	·	1.1 km	MPC · JPL
492018	2013 GO_{15}	—	April 1, 2013	Catalina	CSS	·	1.6 km	MPC · JPL
492019	2013 GD_{20}	—	September 26, 2006	Mount Lemmon	Mount Lemmon Survey	·	970 m	MPC · JPL
492020	2013 GK_{26}	—	March 19, 2013	Haleakala	Pan-STARRS 1	·	1.4 km	MPC · JPL
492021	2013 GT_{33}	—	September 25, 2006	Kitt Peak	Spacewatch	·	870 m	MPC · JPL
492022	2013 GQ_{35}	—	June 2, 2009	Mount Lemmon	Mount Lemmon Survey	·	1.5 km	MPC · JPL
492023	2013 GT_{37}	—	March 16, 2013	Kitt Peak	Spacewatch	MAR	850 m	MPC · JPL
492024	2013 GM_{42}	—	October 25, 2011	Haleakala	Pan-STARRS 1	·	1.2 km	MPC · JPL
492025	2013 GJ_{48}	—	April 2, 2009	Kitt Peak	Spacewatch	·	900 m	MPC · JPL
492026	2013 GK_{49}	—	March 1, 2009	Kitt Peak	Spacewatch	NYS	1.0 km	MPC · JPL
492027	2013 GU_{49}	—	March 15, 2013	Kitt Peak	Spacewatch	KON	2.2 km	MPC · JPL
492028	2013 GU_{55}	—	April 6, 2005	Kitt Peak	Spacewatch	·	880 m	MPC · JPL
492029	2013 GB_{67}	—	August 28, 2011	Haleakala	Pan-STARRS 1	·	1.3 km	MPC · JPL
492030	2013 GU_{70}	—	April 9, 2013	Haleakala	Pan-STARRS 1	KON	2.1 km	MPC · JPL
492031	2013 GH_{71}	—	December 31, 2007	Mount Lemmon	Mount Lemmon Survey	·	930 m	MPC · JPL
492032	2013 GO_{71}	—	March 2, 2009	Mount Lemmon	Mount Lemmon Survey	·	1.4 km	MPC · JPL
492033	2013 GB_{73}	—	March 31, 2009	Kitt Peak	Spacewatch	·	990 m	MPC · JPL
492034	2013 GY_{76}	—	March 5, 2013	Mount Lemmon	Mount Lemmon Survey	·	1.3 km	MPC · JPL
492035	2013 GN_{78}	—	December 22, 2012	Haleakala	Pan-STARRS 1	·	1.3 km	MPC · JPL
492036	2013 GV_{81}	—	April 11, 2013	Kitt Peak	Spacewatch	·	1.9 km	MPC · JPL
492037	2013 GT_{87}	—	April 6, 2013	Haleakala	Pan-STARRS 1	·	2.4 km	MPC · JPL
492038	2013 GT_{88}	—	March 14, 2013	Mount Lemmon	Mount Lemmon Survey	·	1.3 km	MPC · JPL
492039	2013 GE_{91}	—	June 1, 2009	Mount Lemmon	Mount Lemmon Survey	·	950 m	MPC · JPL
492040	2013 GN_{97}	—	March 19, 2009	Kitt Peak	Spacewatch	·	930 m	MPC · JPL
492041	2013 GB_{102}	—	March 25, 2006	Kitt Peak	Spacewatch	·	850 m	MPC · JPL
492042	2013 GJ_{112}	—	May 18, 2009	Mount Lemmon	Mount Lemmon Survey	·	920 m	MPC · JPL
492043	2013 GL_{112}	—	May 1, 2009	Mount Lemmon	Mount Lemmon Survey	·	1.1 km	MPC · JPL
492044	2013 GC_{116}	—	April 4, 2013	Haleakala	Pan-STARRS 1	PHO	1.0 km	MPC · JPL
492045	2013 GR_{129}	—	April 2, 2009	Mount Lemmon	Mount Lemmon Survey	·	1.1 km	MPC · JPL
492046	2013 GE_{130}	—	December 23, 2012	Haleakala	Pan-STARRS 1	(1547)	1.6 km	MPC · JPL
492047	2013 GR_{131}	—	March 19, 2013	Haleakala	Pan-STARRS 1	·	1.5 km	MPC · JPL
492048	2013 GC_{136}	—	April 11, 2013	Kitt Peak	Spacewatch	·	1.7 km	MPC · JPL
492049	2013 HX_{1}	—	May 16, 2009	Mount Lemmon	Mount Lemmon Survey	·	1.4 km	MPC · JPL
492050	2013 HB_{6}	—	April 18, 2013	Kitt Peak	Spacewatch	·	1.2 km	MPC · JPL
492051	2013 HV_{8}	—	April 20, 2009	Kitt Peak	Spacewatch	(1547)	1.2 km	MPC · JPL
492052	2013 HF_{11}	—	March 18, 2013	Mount Lemmon	Mount Lemmon Survey	·	1.6 km	MPC · JPL
492053	2013 HJ_{14}	—	May 2, 2009	Kitt Peak	Spacewatch	EUN	940 m	MPC · JPL
492054	2013 HK_{17}	—	October 13, 2006	Kitt Peak	Spacewatch	·	1.7 km	MPC · JPL
492055	2013 HF_{25}	—	March 13, 2013	Mount Lemmon	Mount Lemmon Survey	EUN	1.4 km	MPC · JPL
492056	2013 HS_{25}	—	June 17, 2009	Kitt Peak	Spacewatch	JUN	910 m	MPC · JPL
492057	2013 HN_{26}	—	October 28, 2010	Mount Lemmon	Mount Lemmon Survey	·	1.5 km	MPC · JPL
492058	2013 HH_{27}	—	January 21, 2013	Haleakala	Pan-STARRS 1	·	1.4 km	MPC · JPL
492059	2013 HP_{28}	—	April 11, 2013	Mount Lemmon	Mount Lemmon Survey	·	1.8 km	MPC · JPL
492060	2013 HH_{52}	—	June 11, 2010	WISE	WISE	·	2.6 km	MPC · JPL
492061	2013 HY_{54}	—	April 9, 2013	Haleakala	Pan-STARRS 1	·	800 m	MPC · JPL
492062	2013 HV_{82}	—	December 18, 2007	Mount Lemmon	Mount Lemmon Survey	·	990 m	MPC · JPL
492063	2013 HY_{99}	—	April 9, 2013	Haleakala	Pan-STARRS 1	·	1.7 km	MPC · JPL
492064	2013 HL_{101}	—	December 14, 2003	Kitt Peak	Spacewatch	·	1.1 km	MPC · JPL
492065	2013 HU_{108}	—	October 19, 1998	Kitt Peak	Spacewatch	·	1.1 km	MPC · JPL
492066	2013 HC_{109}	—	April 8, 2013	Mount Lemmon	Mount Lemmon Survey	·	1.3 km	MPC · JPL
492067	2013 HE_{113}	—	April 9, 2013	Haleakala	Pan-STARRS 1	·	1.4 km	MPC · JPL
492068	2013 HG_{116}	—	January 12, 2008	Kitt Peak	Spacewatch	·	1.1 km	MPC · JPL
492069	2013 HQ_{125}	—	May 14, 2009	Kitt Peak	Spacewatch	MAR	860 m	MPC · JPL
492070	2013 HB_{136}	—	October 17, 2010	Mount Lemmon	Mount Lemmon Survey	·	930 m	MPC · JPL
492071	2013 HB_{144}	—	June 4, 2005	Kitt Peak	Spacewatch	·	980 m	MPC · JPL
492072	2013 JY	—	May 16, 2005	Mount Lemmon	Mount Lemmon Survey	·	650 m	MPC · JPL
492073	2013 JK_{1}	—	June 15, 2005	Mount Lemmon	Mount Lemmon Survey	·	1.1 km	MPC · JPL
492074	2013 JM_{1}	—	May 1, 2013	Kitt Peak	Spacewatch	·	1.4 km	MPC · JPL
492075	2013 JE_{2}	—	February 12, 2008	Mount Lemmon	Mount Lemmon Survey	·	1.8 km	MPC · JPL
492076	2013 JC_{5}	—	May 13, 2009	Kitt Peak	Spacewatch	EUN	1.1 km	MPC · JPL
492077	2013 JN_{5}	—	November 24, 2011	Haleakala	Pan-STARRS 1	·	2.1 km	MPC · JPL
492078	2013 JO_{9}	—	April 13, 2013	Haleakala	Pan-STARRS 1	·	1.1 km	MPC · JPL
492079	2013 JH_{10}	—	March 18, 2009	Kitt Peak	Spacewatch	·	1.4 km	MPC · JPL
492080	2013 JT_{11}	—	April 18, 2009	Mount Lemmon	Mount Lemmon Survey	·	880 m	MPC · JPL
492081	2013 JB_{14}	—	April 7, 2013	Mount Lemmon	Mount Lemmon Survey	EUN	1.2 km	MPC · JPL
492082	2013 JE_{15}	—	April 18, 2013	Siding Spring	SSS	·	2.1 km	MPC · JPL
492083	2013 JT_{20}	—	January 26, 2012	Haleakala	Pan-STARRS 1	·	1.0 km	MPC · JPL
492084	2013 JC_{22}	—	April 10, 2013	Mount Lemmon	Mount Lemmon Survey	RAF	1.2 km	MPC · JPL
492085	2013 JM_{30}	—	April 16, 2013	Haleakala	Pan-STARRS 1	·	1.3 km	MPC · JPL
492086	2013 JT_{31}	—	March 15, 2004	Kitt Peak	Spacewatch	·	1.2 km	MPC · JPL
492087	2013 JW_{35}	—	May 15, 2013	Haleakala	Pan-STARRS 1	EOS	1.9 km	MPC · JPL
492088	2013 JK_{38}	—	May 10, 2013	Kitt Peak	Spacewatch	·	2.0 km	MPC · JPL
492089	2013 JE_{39}	—	March 14, 2013	Kitt Peak	Spacewatch	·	1.0 km	MPC · JPL
492090	2013 JX_{40}	—	April 13, 2013	Haleakala	Pan-STARRS 1	·	950 m	MPC · JPL
492091	2013 JW_{45}	—	April 16, 2013	Haleakala	Pan-STARRS 1	·	1.3 km	MPC · JPL
492092	2013 JD_{46}	—	August 16, 2009	Catalina	CSS	BRA	1.5 km	MPC · JPL
492093	2013 JD_{47}	—	January 30, 2012	Mount Lemmon	Mount Lemmon Survey	·	1.7 km	MPC · JPL
492094	2013 JF_{54}	—	May 15, 2005	Mount Lemmon	Mount Lemmon Survey	·	1.2 km	MPC · JPL
492095	2013 JX_{54}	—	May 13, 2009	Kitt Peak	Spacewatch	MAR	950 m	MPC · JPL
492096	2013 JC_{55}	—	September 30, 2010	Mount Lemmon	Mount Lemmon Survey	·	980 m	MPC · JPL
492097	2013 JF_{55}	—	April 2, 2009	Mount Lemmon	Mount Lemmon Survey	MAS	690 m	MPC · JPL
492098	2013 JU_{56}	—	April 15, 2013	Haleakala	Pan-STARRS 1	·	1.7 km	MPC · JPL
492099	2013 JA_{57}	—	October 28, 2006	Kitt Peak	Spacewatch	EUN	1.0 km	MPC · JPL
492100	2013 JV_{60}	—	March 17, 2004	Kitt Peak	Spacewatch	MIS	2.0 km	MPC · JPL

== 492101–492200 ==
back to top

Designation			Discovery			Properties		Ref
Permanent	Provisional	Named after	Date	Site	Discoverer(s)	Category	Diam.	Ref
492101	2013 JV_{61}	—	October 21, 2001	Socorro	LINEAR	·	1.5 km	MPC · JPL
492102	2013 JT_{62}	—	March 14, 2013	Mount Lemmon	Mount Lemmon Survey	·	1.3 km	MPC · JPL
492103	2013 JV_{62}	—	October 28, 2010	Mount Lemmon	Mount Lemmon Survey	BRG	1.3 km	MPC · JPL
492104	2013 KM	—	October 31, 2010	Mount Lemmon	Mount Lemmon Survey	·	1.2 km	MPC · JPL
492105	2013 KT_{2}	—	November 25, 2011	Haleakala	Pan-STARRS 1	·	1.9 km	MPC · JPL
492106	2013 KX_{2}	—	November 20, 2006	Kitt Peak	Spacewatch	EUN	1.2 km	MPC · JPL
492107	2013 KC_{3}	—	May 20, 2013	Catalina	CSS	·	1.1 km	MPC · JPL
492108	2013 KM_{7}	—	February 14, 2013	Haleakala	Pan-STARRS 1	·	1.3 km	MPC · JPL
492109	2013 KR_{8}	—	April 12, 2013	Haleakala	Pan-STARRS 1	·	1.6 km	MPC · JPL
492110	2013 KE_{9}	—	March 10, 2008	Kitt Peak	Spacewatch	·	1.4 km	MPC · JPL
492111	2013 KW_{12}	—	April 29, 2009	Mount Lemmon	Mount Lemmon Survey	·	1.0 km	MPC · JPL
492112 Jordicamarasa	2013 KC_{15}	Jordicamarasa	February 28, 2008	Mount Lemmon	Mount Lemmon Survey	KON	2.2 km	MPC · JPL
492113	2013 KY_{17}	—	June 17, 2009	La Sagra	OAM	·	1.3 km	MPC · JPL
492114	2013 KC_{18}	—	April 12, 2013	Haleakala	Pan-STARRS 1	·	1.5 km	MPC · JPL
492115	2013 LO	—	November 18, 2006	Mount Lemmon	Mount Lemmon Survey	·	2.2 km	MPC · JPL
492116	2013 LP	—	April 16, 2013	Haleakala	Pan-STARRS 1	·	1.6 km	MPC · JPL
492117	2013 LJ_{2}	—	June 19, 2009	Kitt Peak	Spacewatch	·	1.6 km	MPC · JPL
492118	2013 LC_{4}	—	April 21, 2013	Mount Lemmon	Mount Lemmon Survey	·	1.1 km	MPC · JPL
492119	2013 LA_{5}	—	May 16, 2013	Haleakala	Pan-STARRS 1	·	1.6 km	MPC · JPL
492120	2013 LP_{6}	—	September 16, 2009	Mount Lemmon	Mount Lemmon Survey	·	1.8 km	MPC · JPL
492121	2013 LP_{8}	—	February 2, 2008	Kitt Peak	Spacewatch	EUN	1.1 km	MPC · JPL
492122	2013 LC_{18}	—	September 18, 2010	Mount Lemmon	Mount Lemmon Survey	·	1.7 km	MPC · JPL
492123	2013 LO_{18}	—	April 15, 2013	Haleakala	Pan-STARRS 1	·	1.3 km	MPC · JPL
492124	2013 LM_{23}	—	February 2, 2008	Kitt Peak	Spacewatch	·	1.3 km	MPC · JPL
492125	2013 LW_{23}	—	December 29, 2011	Mount Lemmon	Mount Lemmon Survey	·	1.7 km	MPC · JPL
492126	2013 LT_{24}	—	May 16, 2013	Haleakala	Pan-STARRS 1	·	1.3 km	MPC · JPL
492127	2013 LK_{26}	—	May 15, 2013	Haleakala	Pan-STARRS 1	GEF	1.1 km	MPC · JPL
492128	2013 LH_{32}	—	May 15, 2013	Haleakala	Pan-STARRS 1	KON	2.0 km	MPC · JPL
492129	2013 LR_{34}	—	August 17, 2009	Kitt Peak	Spacewatch	·	2.4 km	MPC · JPL
492130	2013 MJ_{1}	—	October 3, 2010	Kitt Peak	Spacewatch	EUN	1.1 km	MPC · JPL
492131	2013 MX_{1}	—	May 15, 2013	Haleakala	Pan-STARRS 1	·	1.5 km	MPC · JPL
492132	2013 MK_{9}	—	October 10, 2009	La Sagra	OAM	·	2.1 km	MPC · JPL
492133	2013 MY_{10}	—	June 18, 2013	Haleakala	Pan-STARRS 1	·	3.0 km	MPC · JPL
492134	2013 ME_{11}	—	June 18, 2013	Haleakala	Pan-STARRS 1	·	2.9 km	MPC · JPL
492135	2013 NV_{5}	—	February 27, 2012	Haleakala	Pan-STARRS 1	AGN	1.0 km	MPC · JPL
492136	2013 NE_{6}	—	January 19, 2012	Haleakala	Pan-STARRS 1	·	1.2 km	MPC · JPL
492137	2013 NU_{8}	—	October 26, 2009	Kitt Peak	Spacewatch	·	2.5 km	MPC · JPL
492138	2013 NJ_{9}	—	July 6, 2013	Haleakala	Pan-STARRS 1	·	2.7 km	MPC · JPL
492139	2013 NK_{18}	—	October 11, 2010	Mount Lemmon	Mount Lemmon Survey	·	580 m	MPC · JPL
492140	2013 NU_{19}	—	April 26, 2007	Mount Lemmon	Mount Lemmon Survey	·	1.9 km	MPC · JPL
492141	2013 ND_{20}	—	March 5, 2006	Kitt Peak	Spacewatch	·	2.6 km	MPC · JPL
492142	2013 NR_{23}	—	May 13, 2009	Kitt Peak	Spacewatch	·	760 m	MPC · JPL
492143	2013 OE	—	July 16, 2013	Haleakala	Pan-STARRS 1	APO +1km	1.0 km	MPC · JPL
492144	2013 OP_{1}	—	October 9, 2008	Mount Lemmon	Mount Lemmon Survey	·	2.8 km	MPC · JPL
492145	2013 OS_{2}	—	April 21, 2013	Haleakala	Pan-STARRS 1	·	1.9 km	MPC · JPL
492146	2013 OA_{6}	—	April 15, 2012	Haleakala	Pan-STARRS 1	EMA	3.3 km	MPC · JPL
492147	2013 OB_{6}	—	November 26, 2003	Kitt Peak	Spacewatch	VER	2.9 km	MPC · JPL
492148	2013 OK_{6}	—	July 28, 2013	Haleakala	Pan-STARRS 1	·	2.9 km	MPC · JPL
492149	2013 OA_{10}	—	February 16, 2012	Haleakala	Pan-STARRS 1	·	2.2 km	MPC · JPL
492150	2013 PY_{7}	—	February 27, 2012	Haleakala	Pan-STARRS 1	PHO	1 km	MPC · JPL
492151	2013 PF_{8}	—	January 27, 2011	Mount Lemmon	Mount Lemmon Survey	·	2.3 km	MPC · JPL
492152	2013 PG_{8}	—	July 28, 2013	Haleakala	Pan-STARRS 1	EOS	1.6 km	MPC · JPL
492153	2013 PO_{8}	—	August 3, 2013	Haleakala	Pan-STARRS 1	·	2.2 km	MPC · JPL
492154	2013 PZ_{8}	—	September 24, 2008	Mount Lemmon	Mount Lemmon Survey	·	2.5 km	MPC · JPL
492155	2013 PR_{14}	—	July 15, 2013	Haleakala	Pan-STARRS 1	·	3.0 km	MPC · JPL
492156	2013 PM_{15}	—	July 14, 2013	Haleakala	Pan-STARRS 1	·	2.9 km	MPC · JPL
492157	2013 PL_{19}	—	March 2, 2011	Mount Lemmon	Mount Lemmon Survey	·	3.7 km	MPC · JPL
492158	2013 PH_{21}	—	October 30, 2005	Mount Lemmon	Mount Lemmon Survey	·	1.2 km	MPC · JPL
492159	2013 PB_{24}	—	August 8, 2013	Haleakala	Pan-STARRS 1	·	2.3 km	MPC · JPL
492160	2013 PP_{26}	—	April 11, 2008	Mount Lemmon	Mount Lemmon Survey	·	1.7 km	MPC · JPL
492161	2013 PN_{28}	—	August 8, 2013	Kitt Peak	Spacewatch	·	2.4 km	MPC · JPL
492162	2013 PO_{28}	—	September 19, 2006	Kitt Peak	Spacewatch	NYS	720 m	MPC · JPL
492163	2013 PA_{38}	—	March 14, 2007	Mount Lemmon	Mount Lemmon Survey	·	2.3 km	MPC · JPL
492164	2013 PZ_{42}	—	February 5, 2011	Haleakala	Pan-STARRS 1	·	2.2 km	MPC · JPL
492165	2013 PY_{44}	—	June 20, 2013	Haleakala	Pan-STARRS 1	·	2.9 km	MPC · JPL
492166	2013 PL_{45}	—	April 15, 2012	Haleakala	Pan-STARRS 1	·	1.2 km	MPC · JPL
492167	2013 PP_{45}	—	February 12, 2011	Mount Lemmon	Mount Lemmon Survey	·	2.9 km	MPC · JPL
492168	2013 PB_{48}	—	September 6, 2008	Mount Lemmon	Mount Lemmon Survey	THM	2.8 km	MPC · JPL
492169	2013 PT_{52}	—	July 19, 2013	Haleakala	Pan-STARRS 1	BRA	1.9 km	MPC · JPL
492170	2013 PV_{52}	—	January 29, 2012	Haleakala	Pan-STARRS 1	H	400 m	MPC · JPL
492171	2013 PU_{56}	—	July 16, 2013	Haleakala	Pan-STARRS 1	·	2.7 km	MPC · JPL
492172	2013 PA_{58}	—	October 29, 2010	Kitt Peak	Spacewatch	V	440 m	MPC · JPL
492173	2013 PM_{58}	—	July 16, 2013	Haleakala	Pan-STARRS 1	·	3.2 km	MPC · JPL
492174	2013 PN_{69}	—	October 10, 2004	Socorro	LINEAR	·	2.9 km	MPC · JPL
492175	2013 PG_{74}	—	March 12, 2007	Mount Lemmon	Mount Lemmon Survey	·	2.0 km	MPC · JPL
492176	2013 QK_{8}	—	October 23, 2008	Mount Lemmon	Mount Lemmon Survey	VER	2.2 km	MPC · JPL
492177	2013 QT_{12}	—	May 16, 2012	Haleakala	Pan-STARRS 1	·	1.8 km	MPC · JPL
492178	2013 QL_{14}	—	September 28, 2008	Mount Lemmon	Mount Lemmon Survey	·	1.4 km	MPC · JPL
492179	2013 QN_{15}	—	March 16, 2007	Mount Lemmon	Mount Lemmon Survey	H	410 m	MPC · JPL
492180	2013 QN_{19}	—	September 24, 2008	Kitt Peak	Spacewatch	·	2.4 km	MPC · JPL
492181	2013 QT_{40}	—	August 8, 2013	Kitt Peak	Spacewatch	·	3.7 km	MPC · JPL
492182	2013 QW_{40}	—	February 25, 2011	Mount Lemmon	Mount Lemmon Survey	·	2.9 km	MPC · JPL
492183	2013 QR_{69}	—	May 16, 2008	Kitt Peak	Spacewatch	·	1.7 km	MPC · JPL
492184	2013 QZ_{69}	—	April 15, 2012	Haleakala	Pan-STARRS 1	·	2.7 km	MPC · JPL
492185	2013 QK_{70}	—	November 9, 2004	Catalina	CSS	·	2.6 km	MPC · JPL
492186	2013 QC_{79}	—	February 5, 2011	Haleakala	Pan-STARRS 1	·	3.0 km	MPC · JPL
492187	2013 QU_{79}	—	April 5, 2011	Mount Lemmon	Mount Lemmon Survey	EOS	1.9 km	MPC · JPL
492188	2013 RK_{14}	—	February 26, 2011	Mount Lemmon	Mount Lemmon Survey	·	2.5 km	MPC · JPL
492189	2013 RS_{28}	—	April 25, 2012	Mount Lemmon	Mount Lemmon Survey	·	2.8 km	MPC · JPL
492190	2013 RO_{29}	—	April 1, 2011	Haleakala	Pan-STARRS 1	·	3.0 km	MPC · JPL
492191	2013 RR_{29}	—	May 15, 2008	Mount Lemmon	Mount Lemmon Survey	·	1.6 km	MPC · JPL
492192	2013 RT_{29}	—	July 19, 2009	La Sagra	OAM	NYS	1.3 km	MPC · JPL
492193	2013 RT_{32}	—	February 10, 2011	Mount Lemmon	Mount Lemmon Survey	·	3.1 km	MPC · JPL
492194	2013 RQ_{34}	—	April 2, 2011	Haleakala	Pan-STARRS 1	·	2.7 km	MPC · JPL
492195	2013 RZ_{35}	—	October 14, 2009	Mount Lemmon	Mount Lemmon Survey	·	1.1 km	MPC · JPL
492196	2013 RJ_{39}	—	January 30, 2011	Haleakala	Pan-STARRS 1	·	1.4 km	MPC · JPL
492197	2013 RR_{42}	—	May 6, 2002	Kitt Peak	Spacewatch	KOR	1.8 km	MPC · JPL
492198	2013 RW_{59}	—	May 27, 2012	Mount Lemmon	Mount Lemmon Survey	·	2.3 km	MPC · JPL
492199	2013 RZ_{64}	—	April 15, 2012	Haleakala	Pan-STARRS 1	PHO	880 m	MPC · JPL
492200	2013 RA_{65}	—	March 25, 2011	Haleakala	Pan-STARRS 1	·	3.0 km	MPC · JPL

== 492201–492300 ==
back to top

Designation			Discovery			Properties		Ref
Permanent	Provisional	Named after	Date	Site	Discoverer(s)	Category	Diam.	Ref
492201	2013 RB_{78}	—	March 2, 2006	Kitt Peak	Spacewatch	LIX	2.8 km	MPC · JPL
492202	2013 RF_{83}	—	September 13, 2013	Kitt Peak	Spacewatch	CYB	3.3 km	MPC · JPL
492203	2013 RA_{94}	—	November 6, 2005	Kitt Peak	Spacewatch	(5)	770 m	MPC · JPL
492204	2013 SD	—	April 4, 2011	Mount Lemmon	Mount Lemmon Survey	·	3.4 km	MPC · JPL
492205	2013 SB_{15}	—	September 23, 2013	Mount Lemmon	Mount Lemmon Survey	MAS	700 m	MPC · JPL
492206	2013 SL_{16}	—	July 7, 2005	Kitt Peak	Spacewatch	·	830 m	MPC · JPL
492207	2013 SP_{22}	—	September 4, 2008	Kitt Peak	Spacewatch	·	3.3 km	MPC · JPL
492208	2013 SA_{25}	—	September 13, 2004	Socorro	LINEAR	·	1.2 km	MPC · JPL
492209	2013 SJ_{26}	—	May 12, 2012	Kitt Peak	Spacewatch	T_{j} (2.99)	3.2 km	MPC · JPL
492210	2013 SP_{27}	—	August 16, 2007	XuYi	PMO NEO Survey Program	TIR	2.9 km	MPC · JPL
492211	2013 SO_{29}	—	September 15, 2013	Haleakala	Pan-STARRS 1	·	2.1 km	MPC · JPL
492212	2013 SM_{36}	—	February 1, 2006	Kitt Peak	Spacewatch	·	2.2 km	MPC · JPL
492213	2013 ST_{43}	—	October 23, 2009	Mount Lemmon	Mount Lemmon Survey	·	1.2 km	MPC · JPL
492214	2013 SN_{44}	—	September 23, 2009	Kitt Peak	Spacewatch	·	1.1 km	MPC · JPL
492215	2013 SY_{52}	—	August 8, 2007	Siding Spring	SSS	·	3.0 km	MPC · JPL
492216	2013 SM_{74}	—	September 10, 2013	Haleakala	Pan-STARRS 1	·	1.2 km	MPC · JPL
492217	2013 SS_{80}	—	September 15, 2013	Haleakala	Pan-STARRS 1	·	2.8 km	MPC · JPL
492218	2013 SM_{85}	—	August 20, 2009	La Sagra	OAM	NYS	1.1 km	MPC · JPL
492219	2013 TT_{9}	—	September 10, 2013	Haleakala	Pan-STARRS 1	·	4.0 km	MPC · JPL
492220	2013 TP_{12}	—	October 1, 2005	Mount Lemmon	Mount Lemmon Survey	RAF	730 m	MPC · JPL
492221	2013 TJ_{20}	—	August 27, 2006	Kitt Peak	Spacewatch	·	480 m	MPC · JPL
492222	2013 TZ_{29}	—	February 25, 2011	Mount Lemmon	Mount Lemmon Survey	·	1.2 km	MPC · JPL
492223	2013 TU_{37}	—	February 19, 2010	Mount Lemmon	Mount Lemmon Survey	·	3.1 km	MPC · JPL
492224	2013 TC_{41}	—	January 29, 2011	Kitt Peak	Spacewatch	MAS	640 m	MPC · JPL
492225	2013 TW_{41}	—	March 13, 2011	Kitt Peak	Spacewatch	·	3.0 km	MPC · JPL
492226	2013 TF_{42}	—	October 2, 2013	Haleakala	Pan-STARRS 1	CYB	4.1 km	MPC · JPL
492227	2013 TJ_{42}	—	October 24, 2005	Kitt Peak	Spacewatch	H	510 m	MPC · JPL
492228	2013 TC_{44}	—	March 27, 2011	Mount Lemmon	Mount Lemmon Survey	·	3.0 km	MPC · JPL
492229	2013 TK_{60}	—	July 23, 1999	Socorro	LINEAR	·	2.1 km	MPC · JPL
492230	2013 TD_{68}	—	August 15, 2013	Haleakala	Pan-STARRS 1	·	3.5 km	MPC · JPL
492231	2013 TK_{72}	—	July 29, 2008	Kitt Peak	Spacewatch	·	1.5 km	MPC · JPL
492232	2013 TA_{73}	—	September 3, 2007	Catalina	CSS	·	2.7 km	MPC · JPL
492233	2013 TM_{79}	—	October 27, 2008	Kitt Peak	Spacewatch	·	2.3 km	MPC · JPL
492234	2013 TP_{83}	—	January 31, 2006	Mount Lemmon	Mount Lemmon Survey	·	1.6 km	MPC · JPL
492235	2013 TA_{89}	—	November 17, 2006	Kitt Peak	Spacewatch	·	910 m	MPC · JPL
492236	2013 TD_{93}	—	October 19, 2003	Kitt Peak	Spacewatch	·	460 m	MPC · JPL
492237	2013 TC_{97}	—	October 3, 2000	Socorro	LINEAR	·	1.3 km	MPC · JPL
492238	2013 TN_{101}	—	August 27, 2008	La Sagra	OAM	MRX	1.1 km	MPC · JPL
492239	2013 TQ_{114}	—	March 27, 2000	Kitt Peak	Spacewatch	·	940 m	MPC · JPL
492240	2013 TT_{114}	—	December 5, 2010	Kitt Peak	Spacewatch	·	450 m	MPC · JPL
492241	2013 TA_{125}	—	October 5, 2013	Haleakala	Pan-STARRS 1	·	2.6 km	MPC · JPL
492242	2013 TC_{133}	—	March 16, 2007	Mount Lemmon	Mount Lemmon Survey	L5	10 km	MPC · JPL
492243	2013 TL_{133}	—	October 15, 2007	Mount Lemmon	Mount Lemmon Survey	·	3.6 km	MPC · JPL
492244	2013 TV_{133}	—	September 10, 2007	Mount Lemmon	Mount Lemmon Survey	THM	2.2 km	MPC · JPL
492245	2013 TB_{137}	—	October 22, 2008	Kitt Peak	Spacewatch	·	3.4 km	MPC · JPL
492246	2013 TL_{137}	—	April 20, 2012	Mount Lemmon	Mount Lemmon Survey	·	2.8 km	MPC · JPL
492247	2013 TQ_{140}	—	September 4, 2013	Mount Lemmon	Mount Lemmon Survey	(12739)	1.4 km	MPC · JPL
492248	2013 TQ_{144}	—	October 9, 1996	Kitt Peak	Spacewatch	·	2.4 km	MPC · JPL
492249	2013 UD_{5}	—	April 1, 2012	Haleakala	Pan-STARRS 1	H	460 m	MPC · JPL
492250	2013 UE_{6}	—	October 6, 2013	Kitt Peak	Spacewatch	·	1.6 km	MPC · JPL
492251	2013 UH_{6}	—	May 12, 2012	Haleakala	Pan-STARRS 1	·	1.4 km	MPC · JPL
492252	2013 UQ_{10}	—	April 18, 2007	Kitt Peak	Spacewatch	H	430 m	MPC · JPL
492253	2013 VM_{14}	—	October 7, 2008	Catalina	CSS	·	2.6 km	MPC · JPL
492254	2013 VK_{20}	—	February 25, 2011	Mount Lemmon	Mount Lemmon Survey	·	720 m	MPC · JPL
492255	2013 VN_{20}	—	January 28, 2007	Mount Lemmon	Mount Lemmon Survey	·	970 m	MPC · JPL
492256	2013 WW_{28}	—	October 23, 2008	Kitt Peak	Spacewatch	·	1.4 km	MPC · JPL
492257	2013 WH_{30}	—	September 23, 2009	Kitt Peak	Spacewatch	MAS	580 m	MPC · JPL
492258	2013 WO_{35}	—	October 18, 2006	Kitt Peak	Spacewatch	·	540 m	MPC · JPL
492259	2013 WH_{36}	—	March 2, 2011	Mount Lemmon	Mount Lemmon Survey	·	640 m	MPC · JPL
492260	2013 WC_{47}	—	January 30, 2011	Haleakala	Pan-STARRS 1	·	3.3 km	MPC · JPL
492261	2013 WF_{55}	—	March 29, 2011	Catalina	CSS	·	1.3 km	MPC · JPL
492262	2013 WP_{56}	—	October 31, 2013	Kitt Peak	Spacewatch	·	1.9 km	MPC · JPL
492263	2013 WJ_{67}	—	November 19, 2008	Mount Lemmon	Mount Lemmon Survey	H	520 m	MPC · JPL
492264	2013 WT_{76}	—	January 10, 2007	Mount Lemmon	Mount Lemmon Survey	NYS	780 m	MPC · JPL
492265	2013 WV_{80}	—	November 9, 2004	Catalina	CSS	·	1.6 km	MPC · JPL
492266	2013 WH_{83}	—	October 21, 2003	Kitt Peak	Spacewatch	·	490 m	MPC · JPL
492267	2013 WA_{86}	—	October 10, 2008	Mount Lemmon	Mount Lemmon Survey	·	2.6 km	MPC · JPL
492268	2013 WC_{106}	—	July 18, 2013	Haleakala	Pan-STARRS 1	LIX	3.6 km	MPC · JPL
492269	2013 WH_{106}	—	September 14, 2009	Catalina	CSS	·	1.4 km	MPC · JPL
492270	2013 WC_{109}	—	January 23, 2006	Kitt Peak	Spacewatch	·	1.5 km	MPC · JPL
492271	2013 XF	—	December 2, 2004	Kitt Peak	Spacewatch	·	1.6 km	MPC · JPL
492272	2013 XO_{5}	—	February 8, 2002	Kitt Peak	Spacewatch	·	730 m	MPC · JPL
492273	2013 XC_{8}	—	September 19, 2009	Mount Lemmon	Mount Lemmon Survey	·	910 m	MPC · JPL
492274	2013 XZ_{12}	—	June 14, 2012	Haleakala	Pan-STARRS 1	H	570 m	MPC · JPL
492275	2013 XP_{15}	—	November 12, 2013	Mount Lemmon	Mount Lemmon Survey	·	540 m	MPC · JPL
492276	2013 XO_{17}	—	October 18, 1995	Kitt Peak	Spacewatch	·	1.2 km	MPC · JPL
492277	2013 XB_{18}	—	January 8, 2006	Catalina	CSS	·	1.3 km	MPC · JPL
492278	2013 XE_{18}	—	April 5, 2011	Mount Lemmon	Mount Lemmon Survey	·	940 m	MPC · JPL
492279	2013 XX_{18}	—	November 22, 2008	Kitt Peak	Spacewatch	H	580 m	MPC · JPL
492280	2013 XP_{24}	—	November 29, 2013	Mount Lemmon	Mount Lemmon Survey	H	520 m	MPC · JPL
492281	2013 YQ_{12}	—	February 5, 2011	Haleakala	Pan-STARRS 1	·	630 m	MPC · JPL
492282	2013 YS_{12}	—	November 12, 2005	Kitt Peak	Spacewatch	3:2 · SHU	3.6 km	MPC · JPL
492283	2013 YG_{17}	—	October 9, 2004	Socorro	LINEAR	·	1.2 km	MPC · JPL
492284	2013 YV_{20}	—	November 24, 2008	Mount Lemmon	Mount Lemmon Survey	H	590 m	MPC · JPL
492285	2013 YA_{21}	—	November 8, 2013	Mount Lemmon	Mount Lemmon Survey	·	1.0 km	MPC · JPL
492286	2013 YZ_{21}	—	May 31, 2010	WISE	WISE	·	4.4 km	MPC · JPL
492287	2013 YG_{47}	—	September 9, 2004	Siding Spring	SSS	H	800 m	MPC · JPL
492288	2013 YP_{49}	—	October 26, 2008	Kitt Peak	Spacewatch	MRX	780 m	MPC · JPL
492289	2013 YR_{76}	—	September 21, 2000	Kitt Peak	Spacewatch	·	960 m	MPC · JPL
492290	2013 YV_{93}	—	July 26, 2011	Haleakala	Pan-STARRS 1	MRX	1.1 km	MPC · JPL
492291	2013 YE_{96}	—	August 10, 2007	Kitt Peak	Spacewatch	·	1.5 km	MPC · JPL
492292	2013 YA_{103}	—	September 6, 2008	Mount Lemmon	Mount Lemmon Survey	·	1.1 km	MPC · JPL
492293	2013 YR_{109}	—	November 8, 2007	Kitt Peak	Spacewatch	·	2.1 km	MPC · JPL
492294	2013 YX_{117}	—	October 23, 2003	Kitt Peak	Spacewatch	·	390 m	MPC · JPL
492295	2013 YY_{123}	—	February 19, 2009	Kitt Peak	Spacewatch	·	2.3 km	MPC · JPL
492296	2013 YX_{128}	—	May 25, 2007	Mount Lemmon	Mount Lemmon Survey	·	1.0 km	MPC · JPL
492297	2013 YJ_{148}	—	September 30, 2013	Mount Lemmon	Mount Lemmon Survey	·	1.4 km	MPC · JPL
492298	2014 AP_{9}	—	November 27, 2013	Haleakala	Pan-STARRS 1	·	620 m	MPC · JPL
492299	2014 AU_{10}	—	January 31, 2006	Catalina	CSS	·	960 m	MPC · JPL
492300	2014 AV_{10}	—	October 22, 2012	Kitt Peak	Spacewatch	EOS	1.8 km	MPC · JPL

== 492301–492400 ==
back to top

Designation			Discovery			Properties		Ref
Permanent	Provisional	Named after	Date	Site	Discoverer(s)	Category	Diam.	Ref
492301	2014 AY_{15}	—	June 11, 2012	Mount Lemmon	Mount Lemmon Survey	H	670 m	MPC · JPL
492302	2014 AC_{17}	—	November 13, 2007	Catalina	CSS	H	630 m	MPC · JPL
492303	2014 AY_{18}	—	November 17, 2006	Mount Lemmon	Mount Lemmon Survey	·	530 m	MPC · JPL
492304	2014 AU_{39}	—	December 11, 2013	Mount Lemmon	Mount Lemmon Survey	H	510 m	MPC · JPL
492305	2014 AO_{46}	—	June 10, 2012	Haleakala	Pan-STARRS 1	H	520 m	MPC · JPL
492306	2014 AK_{48}	—	October 19, 2003	Kitt Peak	Spacewatch	AGN	1.1 km	MPC · JPL
492307	2014 AL_{52}	—	April 2, 2011	Mount Lemmon	Mount Lemmon Survey	·	750 m	MPC · JPL
492308	2014 BB	—	May 18, 2012	Haleakala	Pan-STARRS 1	H	500 m	MPC · JPL
492309	2014 BC_{6}	—	October 7, 2007	Catalina	CSS	·	1.4 km	MPC · JPL
492310	2014 BR_{7}	—	October 22, 2012	Haleakala	Pan-STARRS 1	KOR	1.3 km	MPC · JPL
492311	2014 BQ_{12}	—	February 18, 2010	Kitt Peak	Spacewatch	·	1.4 km	MPC · JPL
492312	2014 BJ_{13}	—	July 28, 2011	Haleakala	Pan-STARRS 1	EOS	1.7 km	MPC · JPL
492313	2014 BP_{16}	—	January 15, 2005	Kitt Peak	Spacewatch	·	1.4 km	MPC · JPL
492314	2014 BS_{20}	—	November 13, 2007	Kitt Peak	Spacewatch	·	2.1 km	MPC · JPL
492315	2014 BX_{23}	—	March 1, 2009	Mount Lemmon	Mount Lemmon Survey	·	2.5 km	MPC · JPL
492316	2014 BB_{25}	—	January 7, 2014	Mount Lemmon	Mount Lemmon Survey	H	480 m	MPC · JPL
492317	2014 BE_{26}	—	September 19, 2006	Kitt Peak	Spacewatch	·	2.6 km	MPC · JPL
492318	2014 BW_{26}	—	December 27, 2005	Kitt Peak	Spacewatch	3:2 · SHU	4.1 km	MPC · JPL
492319	2014 BD_{28}	—	October 9, 2007	Kitt Peak	Spacewatch	·	2.0 km	MPC · JPL
492320	2014 BF_{47}	—	September 3, 2010	La Sagra	OAM	H	530 m	MPC · JPL
492321	2014 BC_{53}	—	November 10, 2004	Kitt Peak	Spacewatch	·	1.2 km	MPC · JPL
492322	2014 CW_{7}	—	March 18, 2010	Kitt Peak	Spacewatch	HOF	2.2 km	MPC · JPL
492323	2014 CC_{13}	—	January 21, 2014	Haleakala	Pan-STARRS 1	H	550 m	MPC · JPL
492324	2014 DO_{2}	—	February 20, 2014	Haleakala	Pan-STARRS 1	H	460 m	MPC · JPL
492325	2014 DA_{3}	—	January 22, 2006	Catalina	CSS	H	560 m	MPC · JPL
492326	2014 DD_{6}	—	January 29, 2014	Kitt Peak	Spacewatch	H	550 m	MPC · JPL
492327	2014 DJ_{17}	—	May 3, 2006	Mount Lemmon	Mount Lemmon Survey	H	680 m	MPC · JPL
492328	2014 DA_{18}	—	September 14, 2007	Kitt Peak	Spacewatch	H	620 m	MPC · JPL
492329	2014 DD_{18}	—	September 17, 2004	Socorro	LINEAR	H	590 m	MPC · JPL
492330	2014 DA_{22}	—	May 18, 2012	Haleakala	Pan-STARRS 1	H	420 m	MPC · JPL
492331	2014 DQ_{24}	—	November 7, 2012	Mount Lemmon	Mount Lemmon Survey	THM	2.0 km	MPC · JPL
492332	2014 DD_{31}	—	October 18, 2007	Kitt Peak	Spacewatch	·	2.0 km	MPC · JPL
492333	2014 DL_{56}	—	September 15, 2009	Kitt Peak	Spacewatch	L4	8.1 km	MPC · JPL
492334	2014 EQ_{5}	—	September 19, 2009	Kitt Peak	Spacewatch	L4	8.1 km	MPC · JPL
492335	2014 EB_{10}	—	February 1, 2005	Kitt Peak	Spacewatch	·	1.4 km	MPC · JPL
492336	2014 EX_{16}	—	September 26, 2009	Kitt Peak	Spacewatch	L4	7.5 km	MPC · JPL
492337	2014 EA_{50}	—	August 24, 2007	Kitt Peak	Spacewatch	H	470 m	MPC · JPL
492338	2014 FW	—	March 12, 2014	Mount Lemmon	Mount Lemmon Survey	centaur	50 km	MPC · JPL
492339	2014 FO_{33}	—	March 24, 2014	Haleakala	Pan-STARRS 1	H	420 m	MPC · JPL
492340	2014 FL_{43}	—	April 8, 2010	WISE	WISE	ADE	2.6 km	MPC · JPL
492341	2014 GP_{28}	—	February 12, 2013	Haleakala	Pan-STARRS 1	·	2.5 km	MPC · JPL
492342	2014 GS_{44}	—	August 22, 2012	La Sagra	OAM	H	570 m	MPC · JPL
492343	2014 GW_{46}	—	October 7, 2012	Haleakala	Pan-STARRS 1	H	490 m	MPC · JPL
492344	2014 GE_{50}	—	April 10, 2014	Haleakala	Pan-STARRS 1	·	820 m	MPC · JPL
492345	2014 HM_{7}	—	December 23, 2012	Haleakala	Pan-STARRS 1	RAF	930 m	MPC · JPL
492346	2014 HW_{7}	—	September 23, 2011	Haleakala	Pan-STARRS 1	·	1.9 km	MPC · JPL
492347	2014 HT_{8}	—	March 9, 2002	Kitt Peak	Spacewatch	·	810 m	MPC · JPL
492348	2014 HS_{12}	—	April 5, 2014	Haleakala	Pan-STARRS 1	fast	1.7 km	MPC · JPL
492349	2014 HE_{13}	—	March 27, 2014	Haleakala	Pan-STARRS 1	·	1.8 km	MPC · JPL
492350	2014 HX_{13}	—	March 27, 2014	Haleakala	Pan-STARRS 1	·	2.0 km	MPC · JPL
492351	2014 HT_{15}	—	January 16, 2013	Haleakala	Pan-STARRS 1	·	2.0 km	MPC · JPL
492352	2014 HQ_{16}	—	November 19, 2003	Kitt Peak	Spacewatch	·	1.4 km	MPC · JPL
492353	2014 HV_{19}	—	March 22, 2014	Kitt Peak	Spacewatch	·	610 m	MPC · JPL
492354	2014 HX_{23}	—	September 4, 2011	Haleakala	Pan-STARRS 1	·	1.6 km	MPC · JPL
492355	2014 HT_{26}	—	September 26, 2011	Haleakala	Pan-STARRS 1	·	1.5 km	MPC · JPL
492356	2014 HC_{27}	—	September 23, 2011	Haleakala	Pan-STARRS 1	·	1.3 km	MPC · JPL
492357	2014 HM_{27}	—	October 1, 2010	Mount Lemmon	Mount Lemmon Survey	·	2.4 km	MPC · JPL
492358	2014 HF_{28}	—	September 4, 2011	Haleakala	Pan-STARRS 1	·	880 m	MPC · JPL
492359	2014 HL_{33}	—	October 25, 2011	Haleakala	Pan-STARRS 1	GEF	1.3 km	MPC · JPL
492360	2014 HS_{40}	—	March 25, 2014	Kitt Peak	Spacewatch	·	2.2 km	MPC · JPL
492361	2014 HA_{44}	—	November 25, 2012	Kitt Peak	Spacewatch	·	900 m	MPC · JPL
492362	2014 HB_{47}	—	March 10, 2008	Mount Lemmon	Mount Lemmon Survey	HYG	2.2 km	MPC · JPL
492363	2014 HK_{47}	—	November 6, 2005	Kitt Peak	Spacewatch	·	2.4 km	MPC · JPL
492364	2014 HQ_{50}	—	October 20, 2007	Mount Lemmon	Mount Lemmon Survey	·	1.5 km	MPC · JPL
492365	2014 HF_{56}	—	April 4, 2014	Haleakala	Pan-STARRS 1	·	1.6 km	MPC · JPL
492366	2014 HS_{60}	—	April 4, 2014	Haleakala	Pan-STARRS 1	AGN	1.1 km	MPC · JPL
492367	2014 HD_{81}	—	November 23, 2011	Mount Lemmon	Mount Lemmon Survey	·	2.6 km	MPC · JPL
492368	2014 HN_{82}	—	July 28, 2011	Haleakala	Pan-STARRS 1	V	470 m	MPC · JPL
492369	2014 HY_{88}	—	March 25, 2014	Kitt Peak	Spacewatch	EOS	1.7 km	MPC · JPL
492370	2014 HQ_{90}	—	December 23, 2012	Haleakala	Pan-STARRS 1	·	1.5 km	MPC · JPL
492371	2014 HU_{91}	—	September 26, 2011	Haleakala	Pan-STARRS 1	HOF	2.6 km	MPC · JPL
492372	2014 HD_{92}	—	September 26, 2011	Haleakala	Pan-STARRS 1	HOF	2.3 km	MPC · JPL
492373	2014 HV_{93}	—	March 20, 2010	Mount Lemmon	Mount Lemmon Survey	·	920 m	MPC · JPL
492374	2014 HZ_{95}	—	September 26, 2008	Kitt Peak	Spacewatch	L4	7.3 km	MPC · JPL
492375	2014 HQ_{114}	—	October 26, 2011	Haleakala	Pan-STARRS 1	·	2.6 km	MPC · JPL
492376	2014 HV_{116}	—	February 28, 2014	Haleakala	Pan-STARRS 1	·	1.8 km	MPC · JPL
492377	2014 HH_{119}	—	September 23, 2011	Haleakala	Pan-STARRS 1	·	1.8 km	MPC · JPL
492378	2014 HM_{122}	—	September 26, 2005	Kitt Peak	Spacewatch	EOS	1.8 km	MPC · JPL
492379	2014 HE_{137}	—	July 27, 2011	Haleakala	Pan-STARRS 1	·	950 m	MPC · JPL
492380	2014 HL_{137}	—	January 14, 2008	Kitt Peak	Spacewatch	·	1.5 km	MPC · JPL
492381	2014 HR_{139}	—	October 24, 2011	Haleakala	Pan-STARRS 1	EOS	2.0 km	MPC · JPL
492382	2014 HQ_{140}	—	July 28, 2011	Haleakala	Pan-STARRS 1	·	980 m	MPC · JPL
492383	2014 HK_{142}	—	April 5, 2014	Haleakala	Pan-STARRS 1	·	2.5 km	MPC · JPL
492384	2014 HF_{143}	—	April 5, 2014	Haleakala	Pan-STARRS 1	·	1.4 km	MPC · JPL
492385	2014 HA_{149}	—	April 5, 2014	Haleakala	Pan-STARRS 1	·	1.8 km	MPC · JPL
492386	2014 HC_{158}	—	September 23, 2011	Haleakala	Pan-STARRS 1	·	1.7 km	MPC · JPL
492387	2014 HL_{162}	—	February 8, 2013	Haleakala	Pan-STARRS 1	EOS	1.7 km	MPC · JPL
492388	2014 HM_{181}	—	August 4, 2011	Siding Spring	SSS	·	720 m	MPC · JPL
492389	2014 JW_{3}	—	December 22, 2012	Haleakala	Pan-STARRS 1	·	2.3 km	MPC · JPL
492390	2014 JC_{5}	—	September 23, 2011	Haleakala	Pan-STARRS 1	KOR	1.4 km	MPC · JPL
492391	2014 JM_{7}	—	October 2, 2005	Mount Lemmon	Mount Lemmon Survey	·	530 m	MPC · JPL
492392	2014 JZ_{9}	—	September 30, 2005	Mount Lemmon	Mount Lemmon Survey	·	510 m	MPC · JPL
492393	2014 JR_{11}	—	April 21, 2014	Kitt Peak	Spacewatch	·	660 m	MPC · JPL
492394	2014 JU_{12}	—	October 1, 2008	Catalina	CSS	·	580 m	MPC · JPL
492395	2014 JU_{22}	—	May 4, 2014	Mount Lemmon	Mount Lemmon Survey	·	640 m	MPC · JPL
492396	2014 JV_{23}	—	May 3, 2014	Mount Lemmon	Mount Lemmon Survey	·	1.4 km	MPC · JPL
492397	2014 JS_{31}	—	January 17, 2013	Haleakala	Pan-STARRS 1	·	1.7 km	MPC · JPL
492398	2014 JU_{45}	—	March 13, 2010	Kitt Peak	Spacewatch	NYS	1.2 km	MPC · JPL
492399	2014 JP_{48}	—	October 26, 2011	Haleakala	Pan-STARRS 1	·	2.3 km	MPC · JPL
492400	2014 JR_{48}	—	October 26, 2011	Haleakala	Pan-STARRS 1	EOS	1.5 km	MPC · JPL

== 492401–492500 ==
back to top

Designation			Discovery			Properties		Ref
Permanent	Provisional	Named after	Date	Site	Discoverer(s)	Category	Diam.	Ref
492401	2014 JQ_{59}	—	October 29, 2008	Mount Lemmon	Mount Lemmon Survey	·	670 m	MPC · JPL
492402	2014 JL_{65}	—	May 8, 2014	Haleakala	Pan-STARRS 1	·	790 m	MPC · JPL
492403	2014 JP_{70}	—	April 30, 2014	Haleakala	Pan-STARRS 1	·	950 m	MPC · JPL
492404	2014 KQ_{4}	—	December 16, 2006	Kitt Peak	Spacewatch	·	1.6 km	MPC · JPL
492405	2014 KB_{6}	—	September 17, 2006	Kitt Peak	Spacewatch	KOR	1.2 km	MPC · JPL
492406	2014 KR_{6}	—	October 24, 2005	Kitt Peak	Spacewatch	·	630 m	MPC · JPL
492407	2014 KU_{8}	—	September 28, 2011	Kitt Peak	Spacewatch	·	740 m	MPC · JPL
492408	2014 KC_{12}	—	February 23, 2007	Mount Lemmon	Mount Lemmon Survey	·	520 m	MPC · JPL
492409	2014 KM_{12}	—	May 21, 2014	Haleakala	Pan-STARRS 1	V	670 m	MPC · JPL
492410	2014 KN_{40}	—	September 30, 2005	Mount Lemmon	Mount Lemmon Survey	·	600 m	MPC · JPL
492411	2014 KO_{56}	—	May 7, 2014	Haleakala	Pan-STARRS 1	·	610 m	MPC · JPL
492412	2014 KU_{57}	—	May 7, 2014	Haleakala	Pan-STARRS 1	V	510 m	MPC · JPL
492413	2014 KO_{80}	—	December 23, 2012	Haleakala	Pan-STARRS 1	V	570 m	MPC · JPL
492414	2014 KY_{81}	—	September 21, 2011	Haleakala	Pan-STARRS 1	·	750 m	MPC · JPL
492415	2014 KX_{82}	—	May 21, 2014	Haleakala	Pan-STARRS 1	V	590 m	MPC · JPL
492416	2014 KG_{89}	—	April 25, 2007	Kitt Peak	Spacewatch	·	710 m	MPC · JPL
492417	2014 KV_{93}	—	May 21, 2014	Haleakala	Pan-STARRS 1	·	550 m	MPC · JPL
492418	2014 KG_{98}	—	September 24, 2011	Mount Lemmon	Mount Lemmon Survey	·	820 m	MPC · JPL
492419	2014 LA_{4}	—	June 3, 2011	Mount Lemmon	Mount Lemmon Survey	·	550 m	MPC · JPL
492420	2014 LK_{5}	—	May 4, 2014	Mount Lemmon	Mount Lemmon Survey	·	1.1 km	MPC · JPL
492421	2014 LP_{8}	—	January 10, 2013	Haleakala	Pan-STARRS 1	·	670 m	MPC · JPL
492422	2014 LJ_{12}	—	August 18, 2007	Anderson Mesa	LONEOS	MAS	770 m	MPC · JPL
492423	2014 LU_{13}	—	October 7, 2004	Kitt Peak	Spacewatch	·	650 m	MPC · JPL
492424	2014 LJ_{15}	—	May 19, 2010	WISE	WISE	·	1.1 km	MPC · JPL
492425	2014 LE_{20}	—	September 23, 2011	Haleakala	Pan-STARRS 1	·	700 m	MPC · JPL
492426	2014 ME_{4}	—	March 6, 2013	Haleakala	Pan-STARRS 1	·	1.7 km	MPC · JPL
492427	2014 MU_{11}	—	May 21, 2014	Haleakala	Pan-STARRS 1	·	520 m	MPC · JPL
492428	2014 MH_{14}	—	February 8, 2013	Haleakala	Pan-STARRS 1	·	880 m	MPC · JPL
492429	2014 MX_{14}	—	June 11, 1994	Kitt Peak	Spacewatch	·	530 m	MPC · JPL
492430	2014 MC_{17}	—	October 6, 2007	Kitt Peak	Spacewatch	MAS	620 m	MPC · JPL
492431	2014 MF_{20}	—	June 5, 2014	Haleakala	Pan-STARRS 1	·	1.5 km	MPC · JPL
492432	2014 MF_{22}	—	January 12, 2008	Kitt Peak	Spacewatch	EUN	1.3 km	MPC · JPL
492433	2014 MP_{24}	—	October 17, 2011	Kitt Peak	Spacewatch	V	580 m	MPC · JPL
492434	2014 MY_{24}	—	June 20, 2014	Haleakala	Pan-STARRS 1	·	1.4 km	MPC · JPL
492435	2014 MJ_{25}	—	April 14, 2007	Kitt Peak	Spacewatch	·	560 m	MPC · JPL
492436	2014 MU_{25}	—	June 25, 2014	Mount Lemmon	Mount Lemmon Survey	NYS	950 m	MPC · JPL
492437	2014 MA_{26}	—	February 9, 2013	Haleakala	Pan-STARRS 1	·	770 m	MPC · JPL
492438	2014 MW_{27}	—	April 20, 2007	Mount Lemmon	Mount Lemmon Survey	·	600 m	MPC · JPL
492439	2014 MT_{30}	—	October 16, 2007	Mount Lemmon	Mount Lemmon Survey	·	1.0 km	MPC · JPL
492440	2014 MM_{37}	—	October 26, 2011	Haleakala	Pan-STARRS 1	V	630 m	MPC · JPL
492441	2014 MO_{38}	—	April 24, 2007	Kitt Peak	Spacewatch	·	610 m	MPC · JPL
492442	2014 MZ_{39}	—	June 27, 2014	Haleakala	Pan-STARRS 1	·	1.8 km	MPC · JPL
492443	2014 MW_{43}	—	May 26, 2010	WISE	WISE	·	650 m	MPC · JPL
492444	2014 MC_{46}	—	November 20, 2008	Kitt Peak	Spacewatch	·	480 m	MPC · JPL
492445	2014 MK_{46}	—	February 10, 2008	Mount Lemmon	Mount Lemmon Survey	·	1.4 km	MPC · JPL
492446	2014 MO_{46}	—	November 18, 2009	La Sagra	OAM	·	2.6 km	MPC · JPL
492447	2014 MC_{54}	—	February 1, 2013	Mount Lemmon	Mount Lemmon Survey	·	760 m	MPC · JPL
492448	2014 MJ_{54}	—	May 15, 2005	Mount Lemmon	Mount Lemmon Survey	ADE	2.2 km	MPC · JPL
492449	2014 MZ_{55}	—	September 13, 2007	Mount Lemmon	Mount Lemmon Survey	NYS	970 m	MPC · JPL
492450	2014 MF_{56}	—	June 24, 2014	Mount Lemmon	Mount Lemmon Survey	·	1.1 km	MPC · JPL
492451	2014 MO_{56}	—	April 14, 2010	Kitt Peak	Spacewatch	·	2.1 km	MPC · JPL
492452	2014 MW_{56}	—	June 27, 2014	Haleakala	Pan-STARRS 1	·	1.5 km	MPC · JPL
492453	2014 MH_{60}	—	June 3, 2014	Haleakala	Pan-STARRS 1	·	1.4 km	MPC · JPL
492454	2014 ME_{61}	—	May 7, 2014	Haleakala	Pan-STARRS 1	PHO	940 m	MPC · JPL
492455	2014 MG_{61}	—	April 7, 2006	Kitt Peak	Spacewatch	MAS	630 m	MPC · JPL
492456	2014 MJ_{61}	—	January 25, 2006	Kitt Peak	Spacewatch	·	690 m	MPC · JPL
492457	2014 MS_{62}	—	June 5, 2014	Haleakala	Pan-STARRS 1	·	1.6 km	MPC · JPL
492458	2014 MF_{63}	—	September 18, 2007	Kitt Peak	Spacewatch	MAS	510 m	MPC · JPL
492459	2014 MR_{63}	—	April 14, 2010	Kitt Peak	Spacewatch	·	750 m	MPC · JPL
492460	2014 MF_{69}	—	March 8, 2005	Kitt Peak	Spacewatch	·	1.6 km	MPC · JPL
492461	2014 NL	—	January 10, 2013	Haleakala	Pan-STARRS 1	·	720 m	MPC · JPL
492462	2014 NZ_{1}	—	April 11, 2010	Mount Lemmon	Mount Lemmon Survey	·	770 m	MPC · JPL
492463	2014 NJ_{3}	—	September 23, 2011	Haleakala	Pan-STARRS 1	·	1.1 km	MPC · JPL
492464	2014 NL_{18}	—	August 4, 2011	Siding Spring	SSS	·	660 m	MPC · JPL
492465	2014 NH_{21}	—	November 15, 2006	Catalina	CSS	·	1.8 km	MPC · JPL
492466	2014 NK_{21}	—	July 2, 2014	Haleakala	Pan-STARRS 1	PHO	800 m	MPC · JPL
492467	2014 NC_{27}	—	February 20, 2009	Kitt Peak	Spacewatch	·	880 m	MPC · JPL
492468	2014 ND_{30}	—	June 5, 2010	WISE	WISE	PHO	1.5 km	MPC · JPL
492469	2014 NH_{30}	—	July 15, 2010	WISE	WISE	·	670 m	MPC · JPL
492470	2014 NJ_{30}	—	May 9, 2010	Mount Lemmon	Mount Lemmon Survey	·	810 m	MPC · JPL
492471	2014 NX_{30}	—	February 25, 2007	Mount Lemmon	Mount Lemmon Survey	·	500 m	MPC · JPL
492472	2014 NB_{31}	—	May 6, 2010	Mount Lemmon	Mount Lemmon Survey	·	910 m	MPC · JPL
492473	2014 NH_{33}	—	September 28, 2011	Mount Lemmon	Mount Lemmon Survey	·	630 m	MPC · JPL
492474	2014 ND_{34}	—	November 3, 2010	Mount Lemmon	Mount Lemmon Survey	·	1.9 km	MPC · JPL
492475	2014 NZ_{36}	—	June 12, 2010	WISE	WISE	·	1.7 km	MPC · JPL
492476	2014 NJ_{37}	—	February 2, 2013	Mount Lemmon	Mount Lemmon Survey	PHO	850 m	MPC · JPL
492477	2014 NK_{37}	—	June 18, 2010	Mount Lemmon	Mount Lemmon Survey	·	1.7 km	MPC · JPL
492478	2014 NB_{39}	—	July 2, 2014	Haleakala	Pan-STARRS 1	APO +1km	1.1 km	MPC · JPL
492479	2014 NM_{44}	—	October 1, 2010	La Sagra	OAM	EUN	1.3 km	MPC · JPL
492480	2014 NQ_{45}	—	May 14, 2010	Kitt Peak	Spacewatch	·	1.1 km	MPC · JPL
492481	2014 NR_{47}	—	December 4, 2010	Mount Lemmon	Mount Lemmon Survey	·	2.3 km	MPC · JPL
492482	2014 NO_{48}	—	April 12, 2013	Haleakala	Pan-STARRS 1	·	1.4 km	MPC · JPL
492483	2014 NU_{48}	—	May 7, 2014	Haleakala	Pan-STARRS 1	MAR	1.3 km	MPC · JPL
492484	2014 NH_{51}	—	April 26, 2006	Mount Lemmon	Mount Lemmon Survey	·	1.4 km	MPC · JPL
492485	2014 NY_{53}	—	October 26, 2011	Haleakala	Pan-STARRS 1	·	740 m	MPC · JPL
492486	2014 NE_{54}	—	May 27, 2010	WISE	WISE	KON	2.5 km	MPC · JPL
492487	2014 NO_{54}	—	October 12, 2007	Mount Lemmon	Mount Lemmon Survey	·	1.5 km	MPC · JPL
492488	2014 NA_{55}	—	October 16, 2007	Mount Lemmon	Mount Lemmon Survey	·	1.2 km	MPC · JPL
492489	2014 NZ_{55}	—	May 8, 2005	Kitt Peak	Spacewatch	·	1.4 km	MPC · JPL
492490	2014 NC_{56}	—	May 6, 2006	Kitt Peak	Spacewatch	V	590 m	MPC · JPL
492491	2014 NJ_{56}	—	August 16, 2007	XuYi	PMO NEO Survey Program	·	820 m	MPC · JPL
492492	2014 NR_{56}	—	March 12, 2010	Mount Lemmon	Mount Lemmon Survey	·	800 m	MPC · JPL
492493	2014 NV_{58}	—	January 19, 2012	Kitt Peak	Spacewatch	·	2.2 km	MPC · JPL
492494	2014 NN_{59}	—	April 19, 2006	Kitt Peak	Spacewatch	·	960 m	MPC · JPL
492495	2014 NF_{60}	—	June 26, 2014	Haleakala	Pan-STARRS 1	·	1.6 km	MPC · JPL
492496	2014 NG_{60}	—	September 9, 2004	Socorro	LINEAR	·	750 m	MPC · JPL
492497	2014 NL_{60}	—	March 25, 2006	Kitt Peak	Spacewatch	·	990 m	MPC · JPL
492498	2014 NB_{61}	—	September 19, 2007	Kitt Peak	Spacewatch	NYS	1.0 km	MPC · JPL
492499	2014 NF_{61}	—	February 15, 2010	Kitt Peak	Spacewatch	·	610 m	MPC · JPL
492500	2014 NG_{62}	—	March 15, 2007	Mount Lemmon	Mount Lemmon Survey	·	690 m	MPC · JPL

== 492501–492600 ==
back to top

Designation			Discovery			Properties		Ref
Permanent	Provisional	Named after	Date	Site	Discoverer(s)	Category	Diam.	Ref
492501	2014 NZ_{62}	—	June 20, 2014	Haleakala	Pan-STARRS 1	V	570 m	MPC · JPL
492502	2014 OQ	—	October 26, 2011	Haleakala	Pan-STARRS 1	(2076)	920 m	MPC · JPL
492503	2014 OK_{4}	—	October 26, 2011	Haleakala	Pan-STARRS 1	·	620 m	MPC · JPL
492504	2014 OG_{17}	—	December 6, 2011	Haleakala	Pan-STARRS 1	(5)	1.2 km	MPC · JPL
492505	2014 OG_{21}	—	March 6, 2013	Haleakala	Pan-STARRS 1	RAF	870 m	MPC · JPL
492506	2014 OJ_{21}	—	March 2, 2006	Kitt Peak	Spacewatch	MAS	540 m	MPC · JPL
492507	2014 OM_{25}	—	June 24, 2014	Mount Lemmon	Mount Lemmon Survey	·	500 m	MPC · JPL
492508	2014 OM_{28}	—	July 25, 2014	Haleakala	Pan-STARRS 1	·	1.1 km	MPC · JPL
492509	2014 OW_{29}	—	March 12, 2010	Kitt Peak	Spacewatch	·	660 m	MPC · JPL
492510	2014 OZ_{33}	—	October 21, 2011	Mount Lemmon	Mount Lemmon Survey	·	660 m	MPC · JPL
492511	2014 OK_{34}	—	July 3, 2014	Haleakala	Pan-STARRS 1	·	960 m	MPC · JPL
492512	2014 ON_{34}	—	April 9, 2010	Kitt Peak	Spacewatch	·	1.1 km	MPC · JPL
492513	2014 OL_{37}	—	January 22, 2006	Mount Lemmon	Mount Lemmon Survey	·	1.9 km	MPC · JPL
492514	2014 OK_{39}	—	February 9, 2013	Haleakala	Pan-STARRS 1	·	1.1 km	MPC · JPL
492515	2014 OE_{41}	—	December 18, 2003	Kitt Peak	Spacewatch	·	1.3 km	MPC · JPL
492516	2014 OH_{41}	—	October 26, 2011	Haleakala	Pan-STARRS 1	V	590 m	MPC · JPL
492517	2014 OK_{41}	—	July 25, 2014	Haleakala	Pan-STARRS 1	·	1.2 km	MPC · JPL
492518	2014 OP_{41}	—	July 3, 2014	Haleakala	Pan-STARRS 1	·	1.1 km	MPC · JPL
492519	2014 OC_{42}	—	March 16, 2010	Kitt Peak	Spacewatch	·	1.3 km	MPC · JPL
492520	2014 OS_{45}	—	March 6, 1999	Kitt Peak	Spacewatch	·	650 m	MPC · JPL
492521	2014 OQ_{48}	—	February 4, 2012	Haleakala	Pan-STARRS 1	·	1.8 km	MPC · JPL
492522	2014 OA_{51}	—	February 27, 2006	Kitt Peak	Spacewatch	MAS	670 m	MPC · JPL
492523	2014 OJ_{52}	—	March 13, 2010	Mount Lemmon	Mount Lemmon Survey	·	550 m	MPC · JPL
492524	2014 OV_{53}	—	August 21, 2006	Kitt Peak	Spacewatch	·	950 m	MPC · JPL
492525	2014 OD_{55}	—	July 25, 2014	Haleakala	Pan-STARRS 1	·	1.7 km	MPC · JPL
492526	2014 OE_{58}	—	September 26, 2011	Haleakala	Pan-STARRS 1	·	640 m	MPC · JPL
492527	2014 OB_{65}	—	April 14, 2010	Mount Lemmon	Mount Lemmon Survey	·	1.1 km	MPC · JPL
492528	2014 OG_{66}	—	September 18, 2006	Kitt Peak	Spacewatch	·	1.1 km	MPC · JPL
492529	2014 OS_{69}	—	February 14, 2013	Kitt Peak	Spacewatch	·	1.3 km	MPC · JPL
492530	2014 OM_{80}	—	June 30, 2014	Haleakala	Pan-STARRS 1	·	590 m	MPC · JPL
492531	2014 OZ_{83}	—	September 4, 2011	Haleakala	Pan-STARRS 1	·	510 m	MPC · JPL
492532	2014 OA_{84}	—	February 8, 2008	Kitt Peak	Spacewatch	·	1.4 km	MPC · JPL
492533	2014 OL_{85}	—	June 4, 2014	Haleakala	Pan-STARRS 1	·	1.7 km	MPC · JPL
492534	2014 OL_{90}	—	July 7, 2010	WISE	WISE	·	1.8 km	MPC · JPL
492535	2014 OQ_{91}	—	July 26, 2014	Haleakala	Pan-STARRS 1	·	1.4 km	MPC · JPL
492536	2014 OZ_{93}	—	July 4, 2014	Haleakala	Pan-STARRS 1	·	1.1 km	MPC · JPL
492537	2014 OP_{94}	—	July 7, 2014	Haleakala	Pan-STARRS 1	·	730 m	MPC · JPL
492538	2014 OV_{94}	—	January 19, 2012	Mount Lemmon	Mount Lemmon Survey	·	1.9 km	MPC · JPL
492539	2014 OB_{100}	—	February 28, 2012	Haleakala	Pan-STARRS 1	EOS	1.7 km	MPC · JPL
492540	2014 OL_{102}	—	July 7, 2014	Haleakala	Pan-STARRS 1	·	1.4 km	MPC · JPL
492541	2014 OQ_{102}	—	July 26, 2014	Haleakala	Pan-STARRS 1	·	1.2 km	MPC · JPL
492542	2014 OK_{105}	—	July 2, 2014	Haleakala	Pan-STARRS 1	·	870 m	MPC · JPL
492543	2014 OX_{105}	—	February 17, 2013	Kitt Peak	Spacewatch	V	610 m	MPC · JPL
492544	2014 OE_{107}	—	July 3, 2014	Haleakala	Pan-STARRS 1	·	960 m	MPC · JPL
492545	2014 OQ_{109}	—	October 8, 2004	Kitt Peak	Spacewatch	·	1.8 km	MPC · JPL
492546	2014 OS_{109}	—	July 25, 2014	Haleakala	Pan-STARRS 1	·	1.9 km	MPC · JPL
492547	2014 OM_{110}	—	September 11, 2007	Kitt Peak	Spacewatch	·	760 m	MPC · JPL
492548	2014 ON_{110}	—	September 26, 2006	Catalina	CSS	·	1.3 km	MPC · JPL
492549	2014 OV_{123}	—	November 23, 2006	Mount Lemmon	Mount Lemmon Survey	·	2.2 km	MPC · JPL
492550	2014 OQ_{124}	—	July 25, 2014	Haleakala	Pan-STARRS 1	·	1.2 km	MPC · JPL
492551	2014 OH_{125}	—	July 25, 2014	Haleakala	Pan-STARRS 1	AGN	940 m	MPC · JPL
492552	2014 OS_{125}	—	December 6, 2007	Mount Lemmon	Mount Lemmon Survey	·	820 m	MPC · JPL
492553	2014 OW_{132}	—	November 19, 2007	Mount Lemmon	Mount Lemmon Survey	·	1.7 km	MPC · JPL
492554	2014 OA_{133}	—	October 23, 2004	Kitt Peak	Spacewatch	·	780 m	MPC · JPL
492555	2014 OM_{134}	—	September 2, 2010	Mount Lemmon	Mount Lemmon Survey	·	1.3 km	MPC · JPL
492556	2014 OM_{135}	—	April 12, 1999	Kitt Peak	Spacewatch	·	890 m	MPC · JPL
492557	2014 OR_{136}	—	January 26, 2012	Haleakala	Pan-STARRS 1	·	1.6 km	MPC · JPL
492558	2014 OP_{139}	—	February 7, 2008	Kitt Peak	Spacewatch	·	1.2 km	MPC · JPL
492559	2014 OV_{140}	—	December 6, 2007	Mount Lemmon	Mount Lemmon Survey	·	1.4 km	MPC · JPL
492560	2014 OJ_{141}	—	March 20, 2010	Mount Lemmon	Mount Lemmon Survey	·	580 m	MPC · JPL
492561	2014 OH_{144}	—	February 13, 2008	Kitt Peak	Spacewatch	ADE	1.5 km	MPC · JPL
492562	2014 OM_{146}	—	June 8, 2010	WISE	WISE	·	2.3 km	MPC · JPL
492563	2014 OD_{147}	—	April 14, 2010	Mount Lemmon	Mount Lemmon Survey	·	960 m	MPC · JPL
492564	2014 OZ_{147}	—	January 11, 2008	Kitt Peak	Spacewatch	·	1.3 km	MPC · JPL
492565	2014 OS_{149}	—	March 13, 2013	Kitt Peak	Research and Education Collaborative Occultation Network	MAS	480 m	MPC · JPL
492566	2014 OF_{151}	—	October 15, 2007	Mount Lemmon	Mount Lemmon Survey	·	870 m	MPC · JPL
492567	2014 OJ_{156}	—	April 19, 2006	Kitt Peak	Spacewatch	·	1.0 km	MPC · JPL
492568	2014 OK_{156}	—	November 22, 2006	Mount Lemmon	Mount Lemmon Survey	·	1.5 km	MPC · JPL
492569	2014 OQ_{156}	—	September 14, 2006	Kitt Peak	Spacewatch	·	1.4 km	MPC · JPL
492570	2014 OW_{160}	—	September 11, 2007	Mount Lemmon	Mount Lemmon Survey	V	480 m	MPC · JPL
492571	2014 OW_{165}	—	June 27, 2014	Haleakala	Pan-STARRS 1	·	630 m	MPC · JPL
492572	2014 OG_{172}	—	September 23, 2011	Haleakala	Pan-STARRS 1	V	650 m	MPC · JPL
492573	2014 OL_{174}	—	April 4, 2010	Kitt Peak	Spacewatch	·	720 m	MPC · JPL
492574	2014 OM_{179}	—	September 11, 2004	Kitt Peak	Spacewatch	·	610 m	MPC · JPL
492575	2014 OC_{180}	—	October 11, 2007	Kitt Peak	Spacewatch	NYS	770 m	MPC · JPL
492576	2014 OH_{180}	—	September 28, 2006	Kitt Peak	Spacewatch	·	1.1 km	MPC · JPL
492577	2014 OU_{184}	—	July 14, 2004	Siding Spring	SSS	·	2.1 km	MPC · JPL
492578	2014 OM_{185}	—	July 27, 2014	Haleakala	Pan-STARRS 1	·	1.2 km	MPC · JPL
492579	2014 OU_{186}	—	July 27, 2014	Haleakala	Pan-STARRS 1	·	1.8 km	MPC · JPL
492580	2014 OY_{187}	—	July 27, 2014	Haleakala	Pan-STARRS 1	·	1.7 km	MPC · JPL
492581	2014 OF_{188}	—	February 7, 2011	Mount Lemmon	Mount Lemmon Survey	·	2.5 km	MPC · JPL
492582	2014 OF_{189}	—	November 10, 2009	Kitt Peak	Spacewatch	·	3.1 km	MPC · JPL
492583	2014 OS_{189}	—	October 28, 2010	Mount Lemmon	Mount Lemmon Survey	·	1.4 km	MPC · JPL
492584	2014 OG_{190}	—	August 28, 2005	Kitt Peak	Spacewatch	·	2.1 km	MPC · JPL
492585	2014 OP_{190}	—	October 1, 2000	Socorro	LINEAR	·	1.8 km	MPC · JPL
492586	2014 OF_{191}	—	July 27, 2014	Haleakala	Pan-STARRS 1	EOS	1.8 km	MPC · JPL
492587	2014 OM_{191}	—	November 8, 2010	Kitt Peak	Spacewatch	·	1.4 km	MPC · JPL
492588	2014 OM_{192}	—	October 8, 2007	Mount Lemmon	Mount Lemmon Survey	·	1.1 km	MPC · JPL
492589	2014 OA_{193}	—	July 27, 2014	Haleakala	Pan-STARRS 1	·	1.1 km	MPC · JPL
492590	2014 OB_{193}	—	July 27, 2014	Haleakala	Pan-STARRS 1	·	1.3 km	MPC · JPL
492591	2014 OH_{194}	—	February 5, 2011	Mount Lemmon	Mount Lemmon Survey	·	2.3 km	MPC · JPL
492592	2014 OM_{194}	—	February 23, 2012	Mount Lemmon	Mount Lemmon Survey	·	1.9 km	MPC · JPL
492593	2014 OW_{194}	—	September 18, 2006	Catalina	CSS	·	1.3 km	MPC · JPL
492594	2014 OX_{194}	—	July 27, 2014	Haleakala	Pan-STARRS 1	MAS	740 m	MPC · JPL
492595	2014 OY_{195}	—	July 27, 2014	Haleakala	Pan-STARRS 1	·	2.7 km	MPC · JPL
492596	2014 ON_{197}	—	July 27, 2014	Haleakala	Pan-STARRS 1	V	610 m	MPC · JPL
492597	2014 OL_{198}	—	May 4, 2009	Kitt Peak	Spacewatch	·	1.4 km	MPC · JPL
492598	2014 OK_{199}	—	March 18, 2010	Mount Lemmon	Mount Lemmon Survey	·	520 m	MPC · JPL
492599	2014 OG_{200}	—	September 24, 2011	Haleakala	Pan-STARRS 1	·	1.2 km	MPC · JPL
492600	2014 OF_{204}	—	December 28, 2011	Kitt Peak	Spacewatch	·	1.4 km	MPC · JPL

== 492601–492700 ==
back to top

Designation			Discovery			Properties		Ref
Permanent	Provisional	Named after	Date	Site	Discoverer(s)	Category	Diam.	Ref
492601	2014 OD_{205}	—	September 12, 2007	Kitt Peak	Spacewatch	V	500 m	MPC · JPL
492602	2014 ON_{205}	—	April 18, 2009	Mount Lemmon	Mount Lemmon Survey	·	1.1 km	MPC · JPL
492603	2014 OQ_{206}	—	October 13, 2010	Mount Lemmon	Mount Lemmon Survey	·	1.8 km	MPC · JPL
492604	2014 OW_{209}	—	April 19, 2002	Kitt Peak	Spacewatch	·	870 m	MPC · JPL
492605	2014 OH_{210}	—	June 27, 2014	Haleakala	Pan-STARRS 1	·	570 m	MPC · JPL
492606	2014 OK_{211}	—	November 12, 2006	Mount Lemmon	Mount Lemmon Survey	·	1.6 km	MPC · JPL
492607	2014 OO_{211}	—	July 25, 2014	Haleakala	Pan-STARRS 1	EUN	1.2 km	MPC · JPL
492608	2014 OS_{214}	—	April 2, 2013	Mount Lemmon	Mount Lemmon Survey	·	960 m	MPC · JPL
492609	2014 OL_{216}	—	March 13, 2013	Haleakala	Pan-STARRS 1	·	2.0 km	MPC · JPL
492610	2014 OC_{225}	—	July 27, 2014	Haleakala	Pan-STARRS 1	·	1.5 km	MPC · JPL
492611	2014 OO_{228}	—	September 23, 2005	Kitt Peak	Spacewatch	·	1.7 km	MPC · JPL
492612	2014 OX_{228}	—	November 18, 2003	Kitt Peak	Spacewatch	·	3.1 km	MPC · JPL
492613	2014 OY_{228}	—	August 2, 2010	Socorro	LINEAR	·	1.2 km	MPC · JPL
492614	2014 OL_{229}	—	March 29, 2012	Mount Lemmon	Mount Lemmon Survey	·	3.1 km	MPC · JPL
492615	2014 OT_{230}	—	February 21, 2012	Kitt Peak	Spacewatch	·	1.8 km	MPC · JPL
492616	2014 ON_{231}	—	August 7, 2010	La Sagra	OAM	·	1.2 km	MPC · JPL
492617	2014 OQ_{243}	—	October 21, 2001	Kitt Peak	Spacewatch	·	610 m	MPC · JPL
492618	2014 OE_{248}	—	January 19, 2013	Kitt Peak	Spacewatch	·	960 m	MPC · JPL
492619	2014 ON_{250}	—	April 20, 2007	Kitt Peak	Spacewatch	·	610 m	MPC · JPL
492620	2014 OJ_{255}	—	November 27, 2006	Kitt Peak	Spacewatch	·	1.4 km	MPC · JPL
492621	2014 OJ_{259}	—	September 12, 2007	Mount Lemmon	Mount Lemmon Survey	·	1.1 km	MPC · JPL
492622	2014 OJ_{260}	—	April 10, 2010	Mount Lemmon	Mount Lemmon Survey	·	730 m	MPC · JPL
492623	2014 OC_{261}	—	March 18, 2010	Kitt Peak	Spacewatch	V	530 m	MPC · JPL
492624	2014 ON_{277}	—	February 14, 2013	Haleakala	Pan-STARRS 1	·	940 m	MPC · JPL
492625	2014 OJ_{281}	—	October 22, 2011	Mount Lemmon	Mount Lemmon Survey	V	810 m	MPC · JPL
492626	2014 OE_{286}	—	October 19, 2011	Kitt Peak	Spacewatch	V	680 m	MPC · JPL
492627	2014 OV_{287}	—	March 16, 2012	Haleakala	Pan-STARRS 1	·	2.7 km	MPC · JPL
492628	2014 OH_{290}	—	November 19, 2008	Kitt Peak	Spacewatch	·	1.1 km	MPC · JPL
492629	2014 OG_{292}	—	August 29, 2006	Catalina	CSS	·	940 m	MPC · JPL
492630	2014 ON_{295}	—	March 8, 2013	Haleakala	Pan-STARRS 1	NYS	1.2 km	MPC · JPL
492631	2014 OU_{297}	—	November 2, 2007	Kitt Peak	Spacewatch	NYS	990 m	MPC · JPL
492632	2014 OJ_{304}	—	August 10, 2007	Kitt Peak	Spacewatch	·	980 m	MPC · JPL
492633	2014 OU_{304}	—	April 18, 2007	Mount Lemmon	Mount Lemmon Survey	·	500 m	MPC · JPL
492634	2014 OK_{315}	—	June 1, 2009	Mount Lemmon	Mount Lemmon Survey	·	2.2 km	MPC · JPL
492635	2014 OU_{316}	—	July 28, 2014	Haleakala	Pan-STARRS 1	V	660 m	MPC · JPL
492636	2014 OK_{317}	—	September 11, 2007	Mount Lemmon	Mount Lemmon Survey	NYS	670 m	MPC · JPL
492637	2014 OS_{318}	—	October 10, 2007	Mount Lemmon	Mount Lemmon Survey	NYS	1.1 km	MPC · JPL
492638	2014 OB_{336}	—	October 25, 2011	Haleakala	Pan-STARRS 1	·	840 m	MPC · JPL
492639	2014 OX_{340}	—	September 21, 2009	Catalina	CSS	·	3.0 km	MPC · JPL
492640	2014 OK_{341}	—	September 23, 2006	Kitt Peak	Spacewatch	·	1.1 km	MPC · JPL
492641	2014 OQ_{341}	—	June 28, 2014	Kitt Peak	Spacewatch	·	1.3 km	MPC · JPL
492642	2014 OV_{343}	—	March 16, 2007	Mount Lemmon	Mount Lemmon Survey	·	630 m	MPC · JPL
492643	2014 OM_{348}	—	October 20, 2011	Mount Lemmon	Mount Lemmon Survey	·	970 m	MPC · JPL
492644	2014 OS_{354}	—	June 29, 2014	Haleakala	Pan-STARRS 1	·	1.5 km	MPC · JPL
492645	2014 OZ_{357}	—	June 2, 2014	Mount Lemmon	Mount Lemmon Survey	(5)	1.1 km	MPC · JPL
492646	2014 OH_{358}	—	March 5, 2010	WISE	WISE	T_{j} (2.99)	4.5 km	MPC · JPL
492647	2014 OO_{360}	—	November 1, 2010	Mount Lemmon	Mount Lemmon Survey	·	2.0 km	MPC · JPL
492648	2014 OY_{366}	—	October 11, 2007	Kitt Peak	Spacewatch	MAS	590 m	MPC · JPL
492649	2014 OY_{372}	—	April 11, 2003	Kitt Peak	Spacewatch	·	860 m	MPC · JPL
492650	2014 OP_{373}	—	October 2, 2003	Kitt Peak	Spacewatch	NYS	900 m	MPC · JPL
492651	2014 OC_{377}	—	October 10, 2007	Kitt Peak	Spacewatch	·	1.1 km	MPC · JPL
492652	2014 OV_{377}	—	February 8, 2013	Kitt Peak	Spacewatch	·	780 m	MPC · JPL
492653	2014 OS_{378}	—	September 13, 2007	Mount Lemmon	Mount Lemmon Survey	·	790 m	MPC · JPL
492654	2014 OM_{380}	—	February 17, 2010	Kitt Peak	Spacewatch	·	550 m	MPC · JPL
492655	2014 OM_{381}	—	March 12, 2010	Kitt Peak	Spacewatch	·	800 m	MPC · JPL
492656	2014 ON_{384}	—	June 28, 2014	Haleakala	Pan-STARRS 1	·	860 m	MPC · JPL
492657	2014 OV_{386}	—	April 4, 2008	Mount Lemmon	Mount Lemmon Survey	·	2.2 km	MPC · JPL
492658	2014 OO_{388}	—	May 31, 2006	Mount Lemmon	Mount Lemmon Survey	NYS	1.0 km	MPC · JPL
492659	2014 PO	—	July 29, 2008	Mount Lemmon	Mount Lemmon Survey	T_{j} (2.97)	3.7 km	MPC · JPL
492660	2014 PJ_{1}	—	January 27, 2012	Mount Lemmon	Mount Lemmon Survey	·	1.5 km	MPC · JPL
492661	2014 PF_{3}	—	July 3, 2014	Haleakala	Pan-STARRS 1	·	950 m	MPC · JPL
492662	2014 PG_{6}	—	June 5, 2014	Haleakala	Pan-STARRS 1	·	1.1 km	MPC · JPL
492663	2014 PQ_{8}	—	January 17, 2013	Haleakala	Pan-STARRS 1	BAP	870 m	MPC · JPL
492664	2014 PX_{8}	—	July 28, 2014	Haleakala	Pan-STARRS 1	V	490 m	MPC · JPL
492665	2014 PB_{9}	—	April 18, 2009	Mount Lemmon	Mount Lemmon Survey	·	1.3 km	MPC · JPL
492666	2014 PJ_{10}	—	March 23, 2006	Kitt Peak	Spacewatch	MAS	600 m	MPC · JPL
492667	2014 PD_{17}	—	February 14, 2013	Mount Lemmon	Mount Lemmon Survey	·	920 m	MPC · JPL
492668	2014 PD_{20}	—	March 18, 2010	Mount Lemmon	Mount Lemmon Survey	·	580 m	MPC · JPL
492669	2014 PN_{20}	—	November 29, 2005	Kitt Peak	Spacewatch	KOR	1.2 km	MPC · JPL
492670	2014 PO_{20}	—	April 26, 2006	Kitt Peak	Spacewatch	MAS	650 m	MPC · JPL
492671	2014 PU_{20}	—	September 2, 2010	Mount Lemmon	Mount Lemmon Survey	EUN	1.0 km	MPC · JPL
492672	2014 PZ_{24}	—	February 9, 2005	Mount Lemmon	Mount Lemmon Survey	·	1.2 km	MPC · JPL
492673	2014 PM_{25}	—	February 3, 2012	Haleakala	Pan-STARRS 1	·	1.7 km	MPC · JPL
492674	2014 PK_{26}	—	November 5, 2007	Kitt Peak	Spacewatch	·	990 m	MPC · JPL
492675	2014 PS_{26}	—	September 13, 2007	Mount Lemmon	Mount Lemmon Survey	·	1.1 km	MPC · JPL
492676	2014 PW_{30}	—	October 24, 2005	Mauna Kea	A. Boattini	·	2.3 km	MPC · JPL
492677	2014 PH_{33}	—	February 28, 2012	Haleakala	Pan-STARRS 1	·	1.6 km	MPC · JPL
492678	2014 PW_{33}	—	September 28, 2003	Kitt Peak	Spacewatch	·	990 m	MPC · JPL
492679	2014 PB_{34}	—	August 4, 2014	Haleakala	Pan-STARRS 1	·	1.8 km	MPC · JPL
492680	2014 PB_{36}	—	March 24, 2006	Mount Lemmon	Mount Lemmon Survey	MAS	520 m	MPC · JPL
492681	2014 PO_{40}	—	January 18, 2012	Mount Lemmon	Mount Lemmon Survey	·	1.5 km	MPC · JPL
492682	2014 PB_{42}	—	May 23, 2003	Kitt Peak	Spacewatch	·	1.4 km	MPC · JPL
492683	2014 PL_{43}	—	April 20, 2009	Kitt Peak	Spacewatch	·	1.2 km	MPC · JPL
492684	2014 PR_{43}	—	August 4, 2014	Haleakala	Pan-STARRS 1	·	1.4 km	MPC · JPL
492685	2014 PX_{44}	—	October 26, 2011	Haleakala	Pan-STARRS 1	·	890 m	MPC · JPL
492686	2014 PE_{45}	—	January 17, 2005	Kitt Peak	Spacewatch	·	2.7 km	MPC · JPL
492687	2014 PE_{48}	—	March 26, 2006	Mount Lemmon	Mount Lemmon Survey	·	970 m	MPC · JPL
492688	2014 PB_{51}	—	March 18, 2009	Kitt Peak	Spacewatch	·	1.9 km	MPC · JPL
492689	2014 PO_{51}	—	February 28, 2008	Mount Lemmon	Mount Lemmon Survey	·	1.4 km	MPC · JPL
492690	2014 PD_{52}	—	January 11, 2008	Mount Lemmon	Mount Lemmon Survey	·	1.5 km	MPC · JPL
492691	2014 PC_{54}	—	June 10, 2005	Kitt Peak	Spacewatch	EUN	1.0 km	MPC · JPL
492692	2014 PN_{54}	—	August 8, 2010	WISE	WISE	·	1.9 km	MPC · JPL
492693	2014 PP_{55}	—	August 2, 2010	Socorro	LINEAR	·	1.2 km	MPC · JPL
492694	2014 PN_{57}	—	February 13, 2010	WISE	WISE	·	4.1 km	MPC · JPL
492695	2014 PZ_{57}	—	March 2, 2009	Kitt Peak	Spacewatch	·	1.4 km	MPC · JPL
492696	2014 PZ_{59}	—	June 24, 2014	Haleakala	Pan-STARRS 1	PHO	1.3 km	MPC · JPL
492697	2014 PJ_{61}	—	October 19, 2011	Mount Lemmon	Mount Lemmon Survey	·	700 m	MPC · JPL
492698	2014 PE_{64}	—	April 17, 2010	Kitt Peak	Spacewatch	·	650 m	MPC · JPL
492699	2014 PW_{64}	—	October 18, 2011	Mount Lemmon	Mount Lemmon Survey	·	620 m	MPC · JPL
492700	2014 PV_{66}	—	November 17, 2011	Kitt Peak	Spacewatch	·	620 m	MPC · JPL

== 492701–492800 ==
back to top

Designation			Discovery			Properties		Ref
Permanent	Provisional	Named after	Date	Site	Discoverer(s)	Category	Diam.	Ref
492701	2014 PN_{67}	—	September 19, 1995	Kitt Peak	Spacewatch	NYS	1.0 km	MPC · JPL
492702	2014 PM_{69}	—	October 17, 2010	Mount Lemmon	Mount Lemmon Survey	·	1.8 km	MPC · JPL
492703	2014 PD_{70}	—	November 2, 1999	Kitt Peak	Spacewatch	NYS	1 km	MPC · JPL
492704	2014 QA_{18}	—	February 16, 2013	Mount Lemmon	Mount Lemmon Survey	NYS	880 m	MPC · JPL
492705	2014 QW_{19}	—	March 5, 2013	Haleakala	Pan-STARRS 1	·	1.7 km	MPC · JPL
492706	2014 QX_{20}	—	February 13, 2008	Mount Lemmon	Mount Lemmon Survey	·	1.7 km	MPC · JPL
492707	2014 QF_{23}	—	October 21, 2003	Kitt Peak	Spacewatch	·	1.2 km	MPC · JPL
492708	2014 QH_{23}	—	October 17, 2003	Kitt Peak	Spacewatch	·	920 m	MPC · JPL
492709	2014 QX_{23}	—	January 11, 2008	Mount Lemmon	Mount Lemmon Survey	·	1.7 km	MPC · JPL
492710	2014 QX_{25}	—	January 17, 2010	WISE	WISE	·	2.5 km	MPC · JPL
492711	2014 QT_{26}	—	January 19, 2012	Haleakala	Pan-STARRS 1	·	1.9 km	MPC · JPL
492712	2014 QG_{29}	—	August 6, 2014	Haleakala	Pan-STARRS 1	·	940 m	MPC · JPL
492713	2014 QT_{29}	—	February 3, 2012	Haleakala	Pan-STARRS 1	PAD	1.6 km	MPC · JPL
492714	2014 QR_{34}	—	November 19, 2011	Mount Lemmon	Mount Lemmon Survey	V	550 m	MPC · JPL
492715	2014 QS_{35}	—	November 30, 2003	Kitt Peak	Spacewatch	·	1.3 km	MPC · JPL
492716	2014 QF_{38}	—	September 16, 2010	Catalina	CSS	·	2.0 km	MPC · JPL
492717	2014 QZ_{39}	—	August 29, 2005	Kitt Peak	Spacewatch	·	1.5 km	MPC · JPL
492718	2014 QK_{40}	—	March 16, 2012	Mount Lemmon	Mount Lemmon Survey	EOS	1.9 km	MPC · JPL
492719	2014 QZ_{45}	—	July 4, 2014	Haleakala	Pan-STARRS 1	(5)	1.1 km	MPC · JPL
492720	2014 QN_{48}	—	September 4, 2010	Mount Lemmon	Mount Lemmon Survey	·	1.6 km	MPC · JPL
492721	2014 QR_{51}	—	February 7, 2008	Kitt Peak	Spacewatch	·	1.7 km	MPC · JPL
492722	2014 QS_{59}	—	March 18, 2010	Kitt Peak	Spacewatch	·	710 m	MPC · JPL
492723	2014 QN_{90}	—	April 14, 2010	Catalina	CSS	·	870 m	MPC · JPL
492724	2014 QD_{103}	—	January 20, 2013	Kitt Peak	Spacewatch	·	1.3 km	MPC · JPL
492725	2014 QL_{105}	—	March 15, 2008	Mount Lemmon	Mount Lemmon Survey	PAD	1.4 km	MPC · JPL
492726	2014 QX_{106}	—	January 1, 2012	Mount Lemmon	Mount Lemmon Survey	·	1.6 km	MPC · JPL
492727	2014 QM_{115}	—	January 26, 2006	Kitt Peak	Spacewatch	·	2.7 km	MPC · JPL
492728	2014 QS_{119}	—	November 3, 2010	Mount Lemmon	Mount Lemmon Survey	AST	1.3 km	MPC · JPL
492729	2014 QK_{120}	—	February 9, 2013	Haleakala	Pan-STARRS 1	·	930 m	MPC · JPL
492730	2014 QU_{120}	—	September 18, 2003	Kitt Peak	Spacewatch	·	960 m	MPC · JPL
492731	2014 QM_{121}	—	August 3, 2014	Haleakala	Pan-STARRS 1	·	2.8 km	MPC · JPL
492732	2014 QC_{123}	—	February 13, 2012	Haleakala	Pan-STARRS 1	·	2.0 km	MPC · JPL
492733	2014 QL_{123}	—	April 7, 2003	Kitt Peak	Spacewatch	·	520 m	MPC · JPL
492734	2014 QV_{123}	—	October 24, 1995	Kitt Peak	Spacewatch	KOR	990 m	MPC · JPL
492735	2014 QN_{125}	—	March 9, 2008	Kitt Peak	Spacewatch	NEM	1.9 km	MPC · JPL
492736	2014 QY_{125}	—	March 3, 2006	Mount Lemmon	Mount Lemmon Survey	·	980 m	MPC · JPL
492737	2014 QD_{127}	—	August 11, 2007	Anderson Mesa	LONEOS	·	620 m	MPC · JPL
492738	2014 QL_{127}	—	September 18, 2009	Kitt Peak	Spacewatch	·	1.8 km	MPC · JPL
492739	2014 QC_{128}	—	March 16, 2012	Mount Lemmon	Mount Lemmon Survey	·	1.7 km	MPC · JPL
492740	2014 QV_{128}	—	January 28, 2010	WISE	WISE	·	4.1 km	MPC · JPL
492741	2014 QD_{129}	—	September 1, 2005	Kitt Peak	Spacewatch	·	1.4 km	MPC · JPL
492742	2014 QQ_{134}	—	March 24, 2012	Mount Lemmon	Mount Lemmon Survey	·	1.7 km	MPC · JPL
492743	2014 QT_{134}	—	April 19, 2004	Kitt Peak	Spacewatch	·	1.5 km	MPC · JPL
492744	2014 QX_{134}	—	May 13, 2010	WISE	WISE	·	1.7 km	MPC · JPL
492745	2014 QZ_{135}	—	January 19, 2004	Kitt Peak	Spacewatch	·	1.1 km	MPC · JPL
492746	2014 QT_{136}	—	April 26, 2006	Mount Lemmon	Mount Lemmon Survey	MAS	710 m	MPC · JPL
492747	2014 QU_{136}	—	October 19, 2003	Kitt Peak	Spacewatch	·	1.1 km	MPC · JPL
492748	2014 QD_{137}	—	September 15, 2007	Mount Lemmon	Mount Lemmon Survey	·	700 m	MPC · JPL
492749	2014 QP_{142}	—	September 19, 2009	Kitt Peak	Spacewatch	·	2.6 km	MPC · JPL
492750	2014 QA_{150}	—	February 28, 2008	Kitt Peak	Spacewatch	PAD	1.4 km	MPC · JPL
492751	2014 QV_{151}	—	June 1, 2005	Mount Lemmon	Mount Lemmon Survey	·	1.4 km	MPC · JPL
492752	2014 QK_{153}	—	May 27, 2014	Haleakala	Pan-STARRS 1	·	1.4 km	MPC · JPL
492753	2014 QD_{166}	—	April 5, 2014	Haleakala	Pan-STARRS 1	·	1.7 km	MPC · JPL
492754	2014 QM_{167}	—	November 28, 2005	Catalina	CSS	·	3.1 km	MPC · JPL
492755	2014 QP_{167}	—	August 5, 2008	La Sagra	OAM	·	5.0 km	MPC · JPL
492756	2014 QE_{168}	—	January 8, 2010	Mount Lemmon	Mount Lemmon Survey	·	3.7 km	MPC · JPL
492757	2014 QL_{168}	—	June 14, 2005	Kitt Peak	Spacewatch	·	1.6 km	MPC · JPL
492758	2014 QC_{170}	—	April 7, 2013	Kitt Peak	Spacewatch	·	1.1 km	MPC · JPL
492759	2014 QD_{170}	—	August 6, 2014	Haleakala	Pan-STARRS 1	·	1.3 km	MPC · JPL
492760	2014 QR_{170}	—	September 21, 2009	Kitt Peak	Spacewatch	·	2.4 km	MPC · JPL
492761	2014 QQ_{171}	—	October 9, 2010	Catalina	CSS	EUN	1.0 km	MPC · JPL
492762	2014 QR_{172}	—	January 30, 2011	Mount Lemmon	Mount Lemmon Survey	·	2.2 km	MPC · JPL
492763	2014 QC_{173}	—	June 11, 2010	Mount Lemmon	Mount Lemmon Survey	NYS	860 m	MPC · JPL
492764	2014 QA_{174}	—	February 7, 2006	Mount Lemmon	Mount Lemmon Survey	·	2.5 km	MPC · JPL
492765	2014 QN_{174}	—	February 28, 2012	Haleakala	Pan-STARRS 1	·	1.5 km	MPC · JPL
492766	2014 QZ_{177}	—	April 20, 2006	Kitt Peak	Spacewatch	·	910 m	MPC · JPL
492767	2014 QV_{178}	—	September 17, 2010	Mount Lemmon	Mount Lemmon Survey	·	1.3 km	MPC · JPL
492768	2014 QL_{179}	—	February 16, 2012	Haleakala	Pan-STARRS 1	·	1.8 km	MPC · JPL
492769	2014 QN_{188}	—	January 27, 2012	Mount Lemmon	Mount Lemmon Survey	·	1.6 km	MPC · JPL
492770	2014 QS_{193}	—	January 4, 2011	Mount Lemmon	Mount Lemmon Survey	·	2.3 km	MPC · JPL
492771	2014 QU_{195}	—	August 25, 2001	Kitt Peak	Spacewatch	·	1.5 km	MPC · JPL
492772	2014 QX_{201}	—	May 6, 2010	Mount Lemmon	Mount Lemmon Survey	·	620 m	MPC · JPL
492773	2014 QA_{205}	—	August 22, 2014	Haleakala	Pan-STARRS 1	·	1.6 km	MPC · JPL
492774	2014 QF_{205}	—	November 12, 2010	Mount Lemmon	Mount Lemmon Survey	·	1.8 km	MPC · JPL
492775	2014 QQ_{207}	—	September 18, 2010	Mount Lemmon	Mount Lemmon Survey	JUN	1.2 km	MPC · JPL
492776	2014 QB_{212}	—	September 23, 2009	Mount Lemmon	Mount Lemmon Survey	·	1.7 km	MPC · JPL
492777	2014 QC_{214}	—	July 1, 2010	WISE	WISE	·	1.2 km	MPC · JPL
492778	2014 QA_{215}	—	July 28, 2014	Haleakala	Pan-STARRS 1	·	1.2 km	MPC · JPL
492779	2014 QO_{216}	—	September 15, 2006	Kitt Peak	Spacewatch	·	730 m	MPC · JPL
492780	2014 QS_{222}	—	October 26, 2011	Haleakala	Pan-STARRS 1	V	630 m	MPC · JPL
492781	2014 QV_{223}	—	October 12, 2007	Mount Lemmon	Mount Lemmon Survey	·	930 m	MPC · JPL
492782	2014 QG_{226}	—	October 13, 2010	Kitt Peak	Spacewatch	·	1.2 km	MPC · JPL
492783	2014 QV_{227}	—	April 2, 2009	Kitt Peak	Spacewatch	·	910 m	MPC · JPL
492784	2014 QE_{228}	—	August 28, 2005	Kitt Peak	Spacewatch	·	1.4 km	MPC · JPL
492785	2014 QU_{228}	—	October 4, 2007	Kitt Peak	Spacewatch	MAS	610 m	MPC · JPL
492786 Ferdowsi	2014 QO_{230}	Ferdowsi	September 24, 2009	Zelenchukskaya	T. V. Krjačko, B. Satovski	EOS	1.6 km	MPC · JPL
492787	2014 QJ_{232}	—	August 15, 2009	Kitt Peak	Spacewatch	·	1.7 km	MPC · JPL
492788	2014 QM_{232}	—	September 13, 2007	Mount Lemmon	Mount Lemmon Survey	·	860 m	MPC · JPL
492789	2014 QP_{233}	—	March 28, 2008	Mount Lemmon	Mount Lemmon Survey	HOF	2.1 km	MPC · JPL
492790	2014 QL_{234}	—	April 20, 2012	Mount Lemmon	Mount Lemmon Survey	·	2.5 km	MPC · JPL
492791	2014 QO_{237}	—	January 30, 2006	Kitt Peak	Spacewatch	·	2.4 km	MPC · JPL
492792	2014 QW_{237}	—	August 29, 2009	Kitt Peak	Spacewatch	·	1.6 km	MPC · JPL
492793	2014 QS_{239}	—	December 4, 2010	Mount Lemmon	Mount Lemmon Survey	(16286)	1.5 km	MPC · JPL
492794	2014 QC_{240}	—	September 18, 2003	Kitt Peak	Spacewatch	·	2.8 km	MPC · JPL
492795	2014 QK_{241}	—	April 20, 2006	Kitt Peak	Spacewatch	NYS	920 m	MPC · JPL
492796	2014 QM_{242}	—	March 28, 2012	Haleakala	Pan-STARRS 1	·	2.5 km	MPC · JPL
492797	2014 QG_{244}	—	April 3, 2008	Kitt Peak	Spacewatch	·	2.1 km	MPC · JPL
492798	2014 QV_{244}	—	January 2, 2011	Mount Lemmon	Mount Lemmon Survey	·	2.1 km	MPC · JPL
492799	2014 QL_{246}	—	September 15, 2004	Anderson Mesa	LONEOS	·	2.1 km	MPC · JPL
492800	2014 QN_{248}	—	January 27, 2012	Mount Lemmon	Mount Lemmon Survey	(5)	960 m	MPC · JPL

== 492801–492900 ==
back to top

Designation			Discovery			Properties		Ref
Permanent	Provisional	Named after	Date	Site	Discoverer(s)	Category	Diam.	Ref
492801	2014 QB_{249}	—	January 31, 2006	Kitt Peak	Spacewatch	·	2.3 km	MPC · JPL
492802	2014 QW_{249}	—	September 22, 2009	Mount Lemmon	Mount Lemmon Survey	·	2.2 km	MPC · JPL
492803	2014 QG_{251}	—	August 22, 2014	Haleakala	Pan-STARRS 1	·	2.4 km	MPC · JPL
492804	2014 QZ_{251}	—	February 21, 2012	Mount Lemmon	Mount Lemmon Survey	TRE	2.0 km	MPC · JPL
492805	2014 QA_{254}	—	November 19, 2007	Mount Lemmon	Mount Lemmon Survey	·	1.5 km	MPC · JPL
492806	2014 QE_{255}	—	January 16, 2008	Kitt Peak	Spacewatch	MAR	1.1 km	MPC · JPL
492807	2014 QW_{255}	—	December 18, 2004	Kitt Peak	Spacewatch	EOS	1.8 km	MPC · JPL
492808	2014 QZ_{259}	—	August 22, 2014	Haleakala	Pan-STARRS 1	·	2.2 km	MPC · JPL
492809	2014 QV_{262}	—	October 21, 2006	Mount Lemmon	Mount Lemmon Survey	·	2.6 km	MPC · JPL
492810	2014 QJ_{263}	—	December 20, 2004	Mount Lemmon	Mount Lemmon Survey	·	2.7 km	MPC · JPL
492811	2014 QV_{264}	—	February 4, 2012	Haleakala	Pan-STARRS 1	·	2.0 km	MPC · JPL
492812	2014 QH_{267}	—	August 18, 2014	Haleakala	Pan-STARRS 1	(5)	1 km	MPC · JPL
492813	2014 QV_{267}	—	September 2, 2010	Mount Lemmon	Mount Lemmon Survey	·	1.2 km	MPC · JPL
492814	2014 QQ_{269}	—	November 15, 2006	Kitt Peak	Spacewatch	·	1.4 km	MPC · JPL
492815	2014 QS_{269}	—	October 4, 2007	Catalina	CSS	T_{j} (2.9)	3.9 km	MPC · JPL
492816	2014 QG_{273}	—	February 7, 2011	Mount Lemmon	Mount Lemmon Survey	·	3.6 km	MPC · JPL
492817	2014 QQ_{275}	—	October 24, 2005	Kitt Peak	Spacewatch	AGN	1.0 km	MPC · JPL
492818	2014 QF_{276}	—	November 26, 2011	Mount Lemmon	Mount Lemmon Survey	V	480 m	MPC · JPL
492819	2014 QF_{279}	—	September 10, 2010	Mount Lemmon	Mount Lemmon Survey	·	1.4 km	MPC · JPL
492820	2014 QB_{280}	—	August 29, 2005	Kitt Peak	Spacewatch	HOF	2.3 km	MPC · JPL
492821	2014 QE_{281}	—	December 8, 2010	Kitt Peak	Spacewatch	·	1.7 km	MPC · JPL
492822	2014 QO_{282}	—	August 25, 2014	Haleakala	Pan-STARRS 1	·	1.3 km	MPC · JPL
492823	2014 QL_{283}	—	August 25, 2014	Haleakala	Pan-STARRS 1	·	2.5 km	MPC · JPL
492824	2014 QM_{284}	—	December 13, 2006	Kitt Peak	Spacewatch	·	2.2 km	MPC · JPL
492825	2014 QW_{288}	—	November 26, 2011	Mount Lemmon	Mount Lemmon Survey	·	2.2 km	MPC · JPL
492826	2014 QH_{290}	—	September 29, 2009	Mount Lemmon	Mount Lemmon Survey	EOS	1.9 km	MPC · JPL
492827	2014 QN_{290}	—	February 3, 2012	Mount Lemmon	Mount Lemmon Survey	EUN	1.3 km	MPC · JPL
492828	2014 QR_{290}	—	December 2, 2010	Mount Lemmon	Mount Lemmon Survey	·	2.1 km	MPC · JPL
492829	2014 QC_{300}	—	November 7, 2010	Mount Lemmon	Mount Lemmon Survey	AGN	1.2 km	MPC · JPL
492830	2014 QJ_{301}	—	February 17, 2010	WISE	WISE	·	3.8 km	MPC · JPL
492831	2014 QB_{304}	—	February 2, 2006	Kitt Peak	Spacewatch	·	2.1 km	MPC · JPL
492832	2014 QQ_{304}	—	July 31, 2014	Haleakala	Pan-STARRS 1	·	1.2 km	MPC · JPL
492833	2014 QZ_{306}	—	July 27, 2014	Haleakala	Pan-STARRS 1	NYS	1.1 km	MPC · JPL
492834	2014 QR_{307}	—	October 18, 2003	Kitt Peak	Spacewatch	·	980 m	MPC · JPL
492835	2014 QW_{307}	—	April 5, 2003	Kitt Peak	Spacewatch	GEF	1.4 km	MPC · JPL
492836	2014 QF_{313}	—	April 29, 2006	Kitt Peak	Spacewatch	·	1.1 km	MPC · JPL
492837	2014 QS_{318}	—	March 19, 2013	Haleakala	Pan-STARRS 1	·	920 m	MPC · JPL
492838	2014 QF_{322}	—	September 18, 2009	Kitt Peak	Spacewatch	·	1.6 km	MPC · JPL
492839	2014 QC_{323}	—	September 20, 2009	Kitt Peak	Spacewatch	·	1.9 km	MPC · JPL
492840	2014 QU_{323}	—	October 13, 2010	Mount Lemmon	Mount Lemmon Survey	·	1.7 km	MPC · JPL
492841	2014 QZ_{325}	—	August 25, 2014	Haleakala	Pan-STARRS 1	·	1.5 km	MPC · JPL
492842	2014 QR_{328}	—	August 25, 2014	Haleakala	Pan-STARRS 1	·	2.0 km	MPC · JPL
492843	2014 QC_{329}	—	October 27, 2005	Anderson Mesa	LONEOS	·	1.7 km	MPC · JPL
492844	2014 QL_{332}	—	October 27, 2009	Mount Lemmon	Mount Lemmon Survey	·	4.6 km	MPC · JPL
492845	2014 QT_{332}	—	October 27, 2003	Kitt Peak	Spacewatch	·	3.2 km	MPC · JPL
492846	2014 QW_{332}	—	August 25, 2014	Haleakala	Pan-STARRS 1	·	2.4 km	MPC · JPL
492847	2014 QT_{336}	—	February 3, 2012	Haleakala	Pan-STARRS 1	·	1.3 km	MPC · JPL
492848	2014 QA_{337}	—	February 15, 2010	WISE	WISE	·	4.3 km	MPC · JPL
492849	2014 QO_{338}	—	February 6, 2013	Kitt Peak	Spacewatch	·	1.3 km	MPC · JPL
492850	2014 QZ_{338}	—	January 19, 2012	Haleakala	Pan-STARRS 1	·	1.5 km	MPC · JPL
492851	2014 QR_{341}	—	November 17, 2006	Kitt Peak	Spacewatch	·	1.7 km	MPC · JPL
492852	2014 QD_{342}	—	September 2, 2010	Mount Lemmon	Mount Lemmon Survey	·	1.2 km	MPC · JPL
492853	2014 QW_{348}	—	March 2, 2011	Catalina	CSS	·	3.8 km	MPC · JPL
492854	2014 QL_{349}	—	September 29, 2009	Mount Lemmon	Mount Lemmon Survey	EOS	2.0 km	MPC · JPL
492855	2014 QN_{350}	—	August 20, 2014	Haleakala	Pan-STARRS 1	·	1.6 km	MPC · JPL
492856	2014 QY_{353}	—	March 1, 2010	WISE	WISE	·	2.9 km	MPC · JPL
492857	2014 QR_{357}	—	February 25, 2007	Mount Lemmon	Mount Lemmon Survey	KOR	1.2 km	MPC · JPL
492858	2014 QE_{358}	—	May 10, 2013	Catalina	CSS	·	2.0 km	MPC · JPL
492859	2014 QK_{358}	—	August 27, 2014	Haleakala	Pan-STARRS 1	·	1.5 km	MPC · JPL
492860	2014 QS_{358}	—	January 30, 2011	Mount Lemmon	Mount Lemmon Survey	EOS	2.1 km	MPC · JPL
492861	2014 QY_{358}	—	December 18, 2007	Mount Lemmon	Mount Lemmon Survey	·	1.1 km	MPC · JPL
492862	2014 QZ_{359}	—	July 27, 2014	Haleakala	Pan-STARRS 1	NYS	810 m	MPC · JPL
492863	2014 QK_{367}	—	April 11, 2013	Mount Lemmon	Mount Lemmon Survey	·	1.2 km	MPC · JPL
492864	2014 QD_{369}	—	October 9, 2005	Kitt Peak	Spacewatch	·	1.7 km	MPC · JPL
492865	2014 QF_{369}	—	September 11, 2007	Kitt Peak	Spacewatch	·	1.0 km	MPC · JPL
492866	2014 QY_{373}	—	July 31, 2014	Haleakala	Pan-STARRS 1	·	940 m	MPC · JPL
492867	2014 QN_{377}	—	January 20, 2009	Mount Lemmon	Mount Lemmon Survey	·	1.2 km	MPC · JPL
492868	2014 QE_{378}	—	April 27, 2012	Haleakala	Pan-STARRS 1	EOS	1.8 km	MPC · JPL
492869	2014 QN_{378}	—	September 28, 2009	Mount Lemmon	Mount Lemmon Survey	·	1.5 km	MPC · JPL
492870	2014 QG_{379}	—	March 16, 2007	Kitt Peak	Spacewatch	EOS	2.0 km	MPC · JPL
492871	2014 QL_{380}	—	October 4, 1997	Kitt Peak	Spacewatch	·	1.2 km	MPC · JPL
492872	2014 QR_{381}	—	December 2, 2010	Mount Lemmon	Mount Lemmon Survey	·	2.0 km	MPC · JPL
492873	2014 QM_{384}	—	January 31, 2010	WISE	WISE	·	3.4 km	MPC · JPL
492874	2014 QK_{388}	—	January 1, 2012	Mount Lemmon	Mount Lemmon Survey	·	1.5 km	MPC · JPL
492875	2014 QV_{392}	—	April 13, 2013	Haleakala	Pan-STARRS 1	·	1.3 km	MPC · JPL
492876	2014 QY_{392}	—	November 6, 2010	Mount Lemmon	Mount Lemmon Survey	·	1.4 km	MPC · JPL
492877	2014 QR_{393}	—	October 9, 2007	Kitt Peak	Spacewatch	·	940 m	MPC · JPL
492878	2014 QZ_{395}	—	March 15, 2007	Kitt Peak	Spacewatch	·	1.7 km	MPC · JPL
492879	2014 QN_{396}	—	April 30, 2006	Kitt Peak	Spacewatch	MAS	540 m	MPC · JPL
492880	2014 QM_{397}	—	August 27, 2014	Haleakala	Pan-STARRS 1	·	1.0 km	MPC · JPL
492881	2014 QH_{399}	—	March 10, 2008	Kitt Peak	Spacewatch	WIT	940 m	MPC · JPL
492882	2014 QS_{399}	—	September 21, 2003	Kitt Peak	Spacewatch	·	2.4 km	MPC · JPL
492883	2014 QA_{400}	—	September 11, 2010	Mount Lemmon	Mount Lemmon Survey	·	1.6 km	MPC · JPL
492884	2014 QU_{400}	—	November 12, 2010	Mount Lemmon	Mount Lemmon Survey	·	1.9 km	MPC · JPL
492885	2014 QS_{402}	—	January 21, 2012	Kitt Peak	Spacewatch	·	1.9 km	MPC · JPL
492886	2014 QV_{402}	—	September 27, 2006	Mount Lemmon	Mount Lemmon Survey	·	1.3 km	MPC · JPL
492887	2014 QW_{405}	—	November 4, 1999	Kitt Peak	Spacewatch	·	1.3 km	MPC · JPL
492888	2014 QE_{406}	—	September 19, 2003	Kitt Peak	Spacewatch	·	2.6 km	MPC · JPL
492889	2014 QQ_{406}	—	October 27, 2003	Kitt Peak	Spacewatch	NYS	1.2 km	MPC · JPL
492890	2014 QJ_{410}	—	February 8, 2002	Kitt Peak	Spacewatch	·	1.9 km	MPC · JPL
492891	2014 QC_{412}	—	January 30, 2006	Kitt Peak	Spacewatch	·	700 m	MPC · JPL
492892	2014 QD_{413}	—	September 13, 2007	Mount Lemmon	Mount Lemmon Survey	MAS	580 m	MPC · JPL
492893	2014 QV_{414}	—	April 24, 2006	Kitt Peak	Spacewatch	V	630 m	MPC · JPL
492894	2014 QM_{415}	—	April 6, 2008	Mount Lemmon	Mount Lemmon Survey	·	1.5 km	MPC · JPL
492895	2014 QA_{416}	—	March 5, 2006	Kitt Peak	Spacewatch	·	2.7 km	MPC · JPL
492896	2014 QH_{422}	—	September 18, 1995	Kitt Peak	Spacewatch	MAS	660 m	MPC · JPL
492897	2014 QA_{424}	—	October 25, 2005	Mount Lemmon	Mount Lemmon Survey	·	1.9 km	MPC · JPL
492898	2014 QD_{425}	—	August 8, 2007	Socorro	LINEAR	·	700 m	MPC · JPL
492899	2014 QX_{425}	—	June 18, 2010	Mount Lemmon	Mount Lemmon Survey	·	1.1 km	MPC · JPL
492900	2014 QE_{426}	—	November 11, 2010	Mount Lemmon	Mount Lemmon Survey	·	1.5 km	MPC · JPL

== 492901–493000 ==
back to top

Designation			Discovery			Properties		Ref
Permanent	Provisional	Named after	Date	Site	Discoverer(s)	Category	Diam.	Ref
492901	2014 QM_{428}	—	February 1, 2006	Mount Lemmon	Mount Lemmon Survey	·	2.2 km	MPC · JPL
492902	2014 QB_{429}	—	December 5, 1999	Kitt Peak	Spacewatch	·	2.7 km	MPC · JPL
492903	2014 QL_{431}	—	August 26, 2014	Haleakala	Pan-STARRS 1	·	3.1 km	MPC · JPL
492904	2014 QU_{431}	—	April 15, 2012	Haleakala	Pan-STARRS 1	·	1.6 km	MPC · JPL
492905	2014 QD_{432}	—	September 28, 2008	Mount Lemmon	Mount Lemmon Survey	·	3.9 km	MPC · JPL
492906	2014 QJ_{432}	—	September 29, 2003	Kitt Peak	Spacewatch	·	1.2 km	MPC · JPL
492907	2014 QG_{437}	—	October 29, 2010	Catalina	CSS	slow	1.8 km	MPC · JPL
492908	2014 QX_{437}	—	March 10, 2008	Mount Lemmon	Mount Lemmon Survey	MAR	1.1 km	MPC · JPL
492909	2014 QZ_{437}	—	October 22, 2008	Mount Lemmon	Mount Lemmon Survey	·	3.2 km	MPC · JPL
492910	2014 QC_{438}	—	August 31, 2014	Haleakala	Pan-STARRS 1	·	2.7 km	MPC · JPL
492911	2014 QG_{438}	—	November 21, 2009	Kitt Peak	Spacewatch	EOS	2.2 km	MPC · JPL
492912	2014 RX_{1}	—	October 13, 2004	Kitt Peak	Spacewatch	·	610 m	MPC · JPL
492913	2014 RN_{3}	—	August 28, 2009	Kitt Peak	Spacewatch	·	1.9 km	MPC · JPL
492914	2014 RX_{8}	—	June 26, 2014	Haleakala	Pan-STARRS 1	·	1.3 km	MPC · JPL
492915	2014 RW_{9}	—	October 3, 2005	Kitt Peak	Spacewatch	·	1.8 km	MPC · JPL
492916	2014 RY_{9}	—	February 27, 2012	Haleakala	Pan-STARRS 1	·	1.9 km	MPC · JPL
492917	2014 RH_{10}	—	September 16, 2009	Kitt Peak	Spacewatch	·	2.0 km	MPC · JPL
492918	2014 RS_{16}	—	January 30, 2011	Mount Lemmon	Mount Lemmon Survey	EOS	2.2 km	MPC · JPL
492919	2014 RV_{16}	—	December 20, 2009	Kitt Peak	Spacewatch	·	3.1 km	MPC · JPL
492920	2014 RT_{18}	—	October 21, 2006	Mount Lemmon	Mount Lemmon Survey	·	2.4 km	MPC · JPL
492921	2014 RH_{21}	—	August 15, 2009	La Sagra	OAM	·	1.5 km	MPC · JPL
492922	2014 RC_{22}	—	March 17, 2012	Mount Lemmon	Mount Lemmon Survey	·	2.3 km	MPC · JPL
492923	2014 RC_{32}	—	May 14, 2009	Kitt Peak	Spacewatch	·	1.6 km	MPC · JPL
492924	2014 RS_{33}	—	October 19, 2010	Mount Lemmon	Mount Lemmon Survey	·	1.5 km	MPC · JPL
492925	2014 RM_{34}	—	November 3, 2007	Kitt Peak	Spacewatch	V	680 m	MPC · JPL
492926	2014 RT_{36}	—	October 1, 2005	Mount Lemmon	Mount Lemmon Survey	AGN	1.1 km	MPC · JPL
492927	2014 RY_{40}	—	October 9, 2007	Mount Lemmon	Mount Lemmon Survey	·	1.1 km	MPC · JPL
492928	2014 RQ_{41}	—	February 26, 2012	Haleakala	Pan-STARRS 1	·	2.3 km	MPC · JPL
492929	2014 RL_{45}	—	December 12, 2006	Mount Lemmon	Mount Lemmon Survey	·	1.4 km	MPC · JPL
492930	2014 RV_{45}	—	September 16, 2001	Socorro	LINEAR	EUN	1.1 km	MPC · JPL
492931	2014 RO_{46}	—	November 6, 2010	Kitt Peak	Spacewatch	·	1.3 km	MPC · JPL
492932	2014 RQ_{46}	—	November 17, 2006	Mount Lemmon	Mount Lemmon Survey	·	1.2 km	MPC · JPL
492933	2014 RO_{49}	—	November 27, 2010	Mount Lemmon	Mount Lemmon Survey	·	1.4 km	MPC · JPL
492934	2014 RY_{49}	—	February 28, 2012	Haleakala	Pan-STARRS 1	·	1.9 km	MPC · JPL
492935	2014 RH_{50}	—	October 17, 2003	Kitt Peak	Spacewatch	·	2.5 km	MPC · JPL
492936	2014 RU_{55}	—	February 2, 2011	Kitt Peak	Spacewatch	EOS	1.4 km	MPC · JPL
492937	2014 RD_{60}	—	October 12, 2007	Kitt Peak	Spacewatch	·	760 m	MPC · JPL
492938	2014 RQ_{61}	—	April 21, 2006	Catalina	CSS	·	1.3 km	MPC · JPL
492939	2014 SK	—	May 17, 2009	Kitt Peak	Spacewatch	·	2.4 km	MPC · JPL
492940	2014 SD_{5}	—	August 30, 2014	Haleakala	Pan-STARRS 1	·	2.1 km	MPC · JPL
492941	2014 SD_{10}	—	September 16, 2001	Socorro	LINEAR	·	1.9 km	MPC · JPL
492942	2014 SE_{14}	—	April 22, 2009	Mount Lemmon	Mount Lemmon Survey	·	900 m	MPC · JPL
492943	2014 SY_{22}	—	October 25, 2005	Mount Lemmon	Mount Lemmon Survey	KOR	1.3 km	MPC · JPL
492944	2014 SL_{24}	—	December 10, 2010	Mount Lemmon	Mount Lemmon Survey	·	1.8 km	MPC · JPL
492945	2014 SV_{26}	—	December 4, 2005	Mount Lemmon	Mount Lemmon Survey	KOR	1.1 km	MPC · JPL
492946	2014 SF_{27}	—	November 13, 2010	Mount Lemmon	Mount Lemmon Survey	·	1.5 km	MPC · JPL
492947	2014 SY_{32}	—	September 16, 2009	Kitt Peak	Spacewatch	·	2.0 km	MPC · JPL
492948	2014 SK_{43}	—	November 6, 2010	Mount Lemmon	Mount Lemmon Survey	·	1.8 km	MPC · JPL
492949	2014 SL_{46}	—	November 20, 2003	Apache Point	SDSS	·	1.5 km	MPC · JPL
492950	2014 SS_{56}	—	July 31, 2014	Haleakala	Pan-STARRS 1	·	2.8 km	MPC · JPL
492951	2014 SW_{56}	—	June 4, 2013	Mount Lemmon	Mount Lemmon Survey	·	1.7 km	MPC · JPL
492952	2014 SL_{62}	—	November 14, 2010	Mount Lemmon	Mount Lemmon Survey	·	1.6 km	MPC · JPL
492953	2014 SJ_{74}	—	September 13, 2007	Mount Lemmon	Mount Lemmon Survey	V	750 m	MPC · JPL
492954	2014 SB_{85}	—	February 25, 2012	Mount Lemmon	Mount Lemmon Survey	·	1.1 km	MPC · JPL
492955	2014 SM_{89}	—	February 28, 2008	Kitt Peak	Spacewatch	·	1.6 km	MPC · JPL
492956	2014 ST_{92}	—	May 16, 2013	Haleakala	Pan-STARRS 1	·	1.6 km	MPC · JPL
492957	2014 SG_{94}	—	February 12, 2008	Kitt Peak	Spacewatch	·	1.3 km	MPC · JPL
492958	2014 SP_{95}	—	September 11, 2010	Mount Lemmon	Mount Lemmon Survey	·	1.4 km	MPC · JPL
492959	2014 SP_{96}	—	July 30, 2014	Haleakala	Pan-STARRS 1	·	1.5 km	MPC · JPL
492960	2014 SJ_{98}	—	October 25, 2005	Mount Lemmon	Mount Lemmon Survey	·	1.8 km	MPC · JPL
492961	2014 SW_{99}	—	February 25, 2011	Mount Lemmon	Mount Lemmon Survey	·	2.2 km	MPC · JPL
492962	2014 SC_{112}	—	September 27, 2005	Kitt Peak	Spacewatch	·	1.5 km	MPC · JPL
492963	2014 SK_{112}	—	November 12, 2005	Kitt Peak	Spacewatch	AGN	1.1 km	MPC · JPL
492964	2014 SV_{116}	—	September 15, 2009	Kitt Peak	Spacewatch	KOR	1.2 km	MPC · JPL
492965	2014 SA_{118}	—	September 18, 2014	Haleakala	Pan-STARRS 1	·	2.6 km	MPC · JPL
492966	2014 SN_{129}	—	January 23, 2006	Kitt Peak	Spacewatch	·	2.3 km	MPC · JPL
492967	2014 SN_{134}	—	September 18, 2014	Haleakala	Pan-STARRS 1	·	2.3 km	MPC · JPL
492968	2014 SL_{135}	—	February 9, 2005	Kitt Peak	Spacewatch	VER	5.3 km	MPC · JPL
492969	2014 SX_{137}	—	April 15, 2012	Haleakala	Pan-STARRS 1	·	3.2 km	MPC · JPL
492970	2014 SB_{140}	—	March 10, 2008	Kitt Peak	Spacewatch	·	1.3 km	MPC · JPL
492971	2014 SL_{144}	—	October 1, 2000	Socorro	LINEAR	·	2.1 km	MPC · JPL
492972	2014 SV_{147}	—	March 14, 2007	Mount Lemmon	Mount Lemmon Survey	·	2.5 km	MPC · JPL
492973	2014 SW_{147}	—	August 30, 2014	Haleakala	Pan-STARRS 1	fast	2.2 km	MPC · JPL
492974	2014 SA_{148}	—	December 10, 2005	Kitt Peak	Spacewatch	615	1.9 km	MPC · JPL
492975	2014 SP_{148}	—	May 2, 2006	Kitt Peak	Spacewatch	·	3.5 km	MPC · JPL
492976	2014 SM_{152}	—	September 20, 2003	Kitt Peak	Spacewatch	·	980 m	MPC · JPL
492977	2014 ST_{153}	—	September 19, 2014	Haleakala	Pan-STARRS 1	·	2.1 km	MPC · JPL
492978	2014 SL_{154}	—	March 3, 2005	Kitt Peak	Spacewatch	·	780 m	MPC · JPL
492979	2014 SV_{154}	—	February 16, 2007	Mount Lemmon	Mount Lemmon Survey	·	1.9 km	MPC · JPL
492980	2014 SY_{155}	—	February 27, 2012	Haleakala	Pan-STARRS 1	HOF	2.6 km	MPC · JPL
492981	2014 SK_{157}	—	April 3, 2011	Haleakala	Pan-STARRS 1	·	2.7 km	MPC · JPL
492982	2014 SM_{158}	—	November 18, 2003	Kitt Peak	Spacewatch	VER	2.7 km	MPC · JPL
492983	2014 SD_{159}	—	July 5, 2005	Mount Lemmon	Mount Lemmon Survey	·	1.1 km	MPC · JPL
492984	2014 SZ_{160}	—	August 7, 2010	La Sagra	OAM	·	1.3 km	MPC · JPL
492985	2014 SB_{161}	—	February 27, 2008	Mount Lemmon	Mount Lemmon Survey	·	1.3 km	MPC · JPL
492986	2014 SG_{163}	—	October 12, 2010	Kitt Peak	Spacewatch	·	2.3 km	MPC · JPL
492987	2014 SX_{164}	—	March 9, 2011	Mount Lemmon	Mount Lemmon Survey	·	3.0 km	MPC · JPL
492988	2014 SP_{165}	—	October 26, 2009	Mount Lemmon	Mount Lemmon Survey	EOS	2.0 km	MPC · JPL
492989	2014 SD_{166}	—	January 19, 2008	Kitt Peak	Spacewatch	JUN	1.4 km	MPC · JPL
492990	2014 SS_{169}	—	May 28, 2005	Campo Imperatore	CINEOS	·	1.3 km	MPC · JPL
492991	2014 SC_{172}	—	October 5, 2005	Kitt Peak	Spacewatch	·	1.4 km	MPC · JPL
492992	2014 SQ_{173}	—	November 2, 2010	Mount Lemmon	Mount Lemmon Survey	·	1.4 km	MPC · JPL
492993	2014 ST_{179}	—	February 15, 2012	Haleakala	Pan-STARRS 1	·	1.3 km	MPC · JPL
492994	2014 SD_{186}	—	May 15, 2005	Mount Lemmon	Mount Lemmon Survey	(5)	2.2 km	MPC · JPL
492995	2014 SW_{186}	—	August 20, 2014	Haleakala	Pan-STARRS 1	·	1.7 km	MPC · JPL
492996	2014 SZ_{189}	—	March 3, 2006	Kitt Peak	Spacewatch	·	1.8 km	MPC · JPL
492997	2014 SZ_{190}	—	December 9, 2010	Kitt Peak	Spacewatch	KOR	1.3 km	MPC · JPL
492998	2014 SE_{191}	—	January 30, 2006	Kitt Peak	Spacewatch	·	2.0 km	MPC · JPL
492999	2014 SN_{192}	—	March 19, 2013	Haleakala	Pan-STARRS 1	·	1.2 km	MPC · JPL
493000	2014 SK_{194}	—	April 8, 2003	Kitt Peak	Spacewatch	·	1.9 km	MPC · JPL

back to top

== Meaning of names ==
As minor planet discoveries are confirmed, they are given a permanent number by the IAU's Minor Planet Center (MPC), and the discoverers can then submit names for them, following the IAU's naming conventions. The list below concerns those minor planets in the specified number-range that have received names, and explains the meanings of those names.

Official naming citations of newly named small Solar System bodies are approved and published in a bulletin by IAU's Working Group for Small Bodies Nomenclature (WGSBN). Before May 2021, citations were published in MPC's Minor Planet Circulars for many decades. Recent citations can also be found on the JPL Small-Body Database (SBDB). Until his death in 2016, German astronomer Lutz D. Schmadel compiled these citations into the Dictionary of Minor Planet Names (DMP) and regularly updated the collection.

Based on Paul Herget's The Names of the Minor Planets, Schmadel also researched the unclear origin of numerous asteroids, most of which had been named prior to World War II. This article incorporates text from this source, which is in the public domain: SBDB New namings may only be added to this list below after official publication as the preannouncement of names is condemned. The WGSBN publishes a comprehensive guideline for the naming rules of non-cometary small Solar System bodies.

Named minor planet	Provisional	This minor planet was named for...	Ref · Catalog
492112 Jordicamarasa	2013 KC_{15}	Jordi Camarasa (born 1976), a Spanish amateur astronomer who actively provides follow up observations of near-Earth asteroids from Paus Observatory (B49) in Sabadell, Catalonia.	JPL · 492112
492786 Ferdowsi	2014 QO_{230}	Abu'l-Qâsem Ferdowsi Tusi, Persian poet and author of the Shahnameh, the national epic of Iran.	IAU · 492786
