= List of minor planets: 476001–477000 =

The following is a partial list of minor planets, running from minor-planet number 476001 through 477000, inclusive. The primary data for this and other partial lists is based on JPL's "Small-Body Orbital Elements" and data available from the Minor Planet Center. Critical list information is also provided by the MPC, unless otherwise specified from Lowell Observatory. A detailed description of the table's columns and additional sources are given on the main page including a complete list of every page in this series, and a statistical break-up on the dynamical classification of minor planets.

Also see the summary list of all named bodies in numerical and alphabetical order, and the corresponding naming citations for the number range of this particular list. New namings may only be added to this list after official publication, as the preannouncement of names is condemned by the Working Group for Small Bodies Nomenclature of the International Astronomical Union.

Near-Earth obj.	MBA (inner)	MBA (outer)	Centaur
Mars-crosser	MBA (middle)	Jupiter trojan	Trans-Neptunian obj.
Unclassified

== 476001–476100 ==
Designation			Discovery			Properties		Ref
Permanent	Provisional	Named after	Date	Site	Discoverer(s)	Category	Diam.	Ref
476001	2007 RG_{48}	—	September 9, 2007	Mount Lemmon	Mount Lemmon Survey	·	1.3 km	MPC · JPL
476002	2007 RT_{49}	—	September 9, 2007	Mount Lemmon	Mount Lemmon Survey	·	1.3 km	MPC · JPL
476003	2007 RP_{56}	—	September 9, 2007	Anderson Mesa	LONEOS	·	1.4 km	MPC · JPL
476004	2007 RZ_{59}	—	August 23, 2007	Kitt Peak	Spacewatch	·	1.6 km	MPC · JPL
476005	2007 RL_{66}	—	September 10, 2007	Mount Lemmon	Mount Lemmon Survey	·	1.4 km	MPC · JPL
476006	2007 RN_{76}	—	September 10, 2007	Mount Lemmon	Mount Lemmon Survey	·	1.3 km	MPC · JPL
476007	2007 RQ_{89}	—	September 10, 2007	Mount Lemmon	Mount Lemmon Survey	·	1.7 km	MPC · JPL
476008	2007 RO_{93}	—	September 10, 2007	Mount Lemmon	Mount Lemmon Survey	·	1.7 km	MPC · JPL
476009	2007 RN_{94}	—	September 10, 2007	Kitt Peak	Spacewatch	·	1.9 km	MPC · JPL
476010	2007 RK_{95}	—	September 10, 2007	Mount Lemmon	Mount Lemmon Survey	(18466)	2.0 km	MPC · JPL
476011	2007 RL_{96}	—	September 10, 2007	Kitt Peak	Spacewatch	·	1.8 km	MPC · JPL
476012	2007 RA_{107}	—	September 11, 2007	Mount Lemmon	Mount Lemmon Survey	·	1.9 km	MPC · JPL
476013	2007 RA_{131}	—	September 12, 2007	Mount Lemmon	Mount Lemmon Survey	·	1.5 km	MPC · JPL
476014	2007 RU_{132}	—	September 13, 2007	Hibiscus	Teamo, N.	·	1.7 km	MPC · JPL
476015	2007 RD_{134}	—	September 11, 2007	Purple Mountain	PMO NEO Survey Program	·	1.9 km	MPC · JPL
476016	2007 RQ_{136}	—	September 14, 2007	Mount Lemmon	Mount Lemmon Survey	·	1.9 km	MPC · JPL
476017	2007 RO_{157}	—	September 11, 2007	XuYi	PMO NEO Survey Program	·	1.9 km	MPC · JPL
476018	2007 RE_{160}	—	September 12, 2007	Mount Lemmon	Mount Lemmon Survey	·	1.4 km	MPC · JPL
476019	2007 RB_{166}	—	August 10, 2007	Kitt Peak	Spacewatch	·	1.6 km	MPC · JPL
476020	2007 RP_{173}	—	September 10, 2007	Kitt Peak	Spacewatch	·	1.5 km	MPC · JPL
476021	2007 RH_{189}	—	September 10, 2007	Kitt Peak	Spacewatch	·	1.3 km	MPC · JPL
476022	2007 RR_{190}	—	September 11, 2007	Kitt Peak	Spacewatch	·	1.3 km	MPC · JPL
476023	2007 RN_{192}	—	September 12, 2007	Catalina	CSS	·	2.1 km	MPC · JPL
476024	2007 RS_{194}	—	September 12, 2007	Kitt Peak	Spacewatch	·	1.8 km	MPC · JPL
476025	2007 RM_{203}	—	September 9, 2007	Mount Lemmon	Mount Lemmon Survey	·	1.1 km	MPC · JPL
476026	2007 RN_{203}	—	September 13, 2007	Kitt Peak	Spacewatch	·	1.7 km	MPC · JPL
476027	2007 RY_{206}	—	September 10, 2007	Kitt Peak	Spacewatch	·	1.6 km	MPC · JPL
476028	2007 RC_{221}	—	September 14, 2007	Mount Lemmon	Mount Lemmon Survey	·	4.4 km	MPC · JPL
476029	2007 RC_{230}	—	September 11, 2007	Kitt Peak	Spacewatch	·	1.5 km	MPC · JPL
476030	2007 RW_{232}	—	September 11, 2007	XuYi	PMO NEO Survey Program	·	2.2 km	MPC · JPL
476031	2007 RB_{235}	—	September 12, 2007	Mount Lemmon	Mount Lemmon Survey	·	1.7 km	MPC · JPL
476032	2007 RN_{235}	—	September 12, 2007	Mount Lemmon	Mount Lemmon Survey	MIS	2.0 km	MPC · JPL
476033	2007 RQ_{252}	—	September 13, 2007	Catalina	CSS	·	1.9 km	MPC · JPL
476034	2007 RE_{260}	—	September 10, 2007	Kitt Peak	Spacewatch	·	1.6 km	MPC · JPL
476035	2007 RR_{265}	—	September 15, 2007	Mount Lemmon	Mount Lemmon Survey	·	1.2 km	MPC · JPL
476036	2007 RB_{267}	—	September 10, 2007	Kitt Peak	Spacewatch	·	1.7 km	MPC · JPL
476037	2007 RB_{271}	—	September 15, 2007	Kitt Peak	Spacewatch	·	1.3 km	MPC · JPL
476038	2007 RZ_{272}	—	September 15, 2007	Kitt Peak	Spacewatch	·	1.6 km	MPC · JPL
476039	2007 RL_{280}	—	September 13, 2007	Catalina	CSS	·	1.4 km	MPC · JPL
476040	2007 RU_{280}	—	September 13, 2007	Catalina	CSS	·	2.4 km	MPC · JPL
476041	2007 RX_{280}	—	September 13, 2007	Catalina	CSS	EUN	1.6 km	MPC · JPL
476042	2007 RH_{286}	—	September 2, 2007	Catalina	CSS	·	1.8 km	MPC · JPL
476043	2007 RN_{287}	—	September 9, 2007	Mount Lemmon	Mount Lemmon Survey	(12739)	1.4 km	MPC · JPL
476044	2007 RT_{287}	—	September 10, 2007	Mount Lemmon	Mount Lemmon Survey	·	1.6 km	MPC · JPL
476045	2007 RH_{288}	—	September 12, 2007	Catalina	CSS	·	1.6 km	MPC · JPL
476046	2007 RN_{288}	—	September 13, 2007	Anderson Mesa	LONEOS	·	1.5 km	MPC · JPL
476047	2007 RL_{290}	—	September 10, 2007	Mount Lemmon	Mount Lemmon Survey	·	1.5 km	MPC · JPL
476048	2007 RX_{290}	—	September 15, 2007	Mount Lemmon	Mount Lemmon Survey	·	1.8 km	MPC · JPL
476049	2007 RB_{293}	—	September 12, 2007	Mount Lemmon	Mount Lemmon Survey	·	2.5 km	MPC · JPL
476050	2007 RJ_{294}	—	September 13, 2007	Mount Lemmon	Mount Lemmon Survey	·	1.4 km	MPC · JPL
476051	2007 RQ_{296}	—	September 12, 2007	Mount Lemmon	Mount Lemmon Survey	·	1.8 km	MPC · JPL
476052	2007 RL_{308}	—	September 12, 2007	Mount Lemmon	Mount Lemmon Survey	·	1.2 km	MPC · JPL
476053	2007 RB_{313}	—	September 3, 2007	Catalina	CSS	·	3.8 km	MPC · JPL
476054	2007 RY_{314}	—	September 5, 2007	Anderson Mesa	LONEOS	GEF	1.3 km	MPC · JPL
476055	2007 RF_{316}	—	September 10, 2007	Mount Lemmon	Mount Lemmon Survey	·	1.4 km	MPC · JPL
476056	2007 RN_{318}	—	September 11, 2007	Mount Lemmon	Mount Lemmon Survey	·	1.2 km	MPC · JPL
476057	2007 RU_{319}	—	September 13, 2007	Catalina	CSS	DOR	2.2 km	MPC · JPL
476058	2007 RQ_{321}	—	September 15, 2007	Socorro	LINEAR	·	1.8 km	MPC · JPL
476059	2007 RE_{322}	—	September 11, 2007	Catalina	CSS	·	1.8 km	MPC · JPL
476060	2007 RA_{325}	—	September 13, 2007	Mount Lemmon	Mount Lemmon Survey	·	1.7 km	MPC · JPL
476061	2007 RS_{325}	—	September 14, 2007	Mount Lemmon	Mount Lemmon Survey	·	1.5 km	MPC · JPL
476062	2007 SH_{12}	—	September 18, 2007	Anderson Mesa	LONEOS	·	1.6 km	MPC · JPL
476063	2007 SG_{13}	—	September 15, 2007	Kitt Peak	Spacewatch	·	2.1 km	MPC · JPL
476064	2007 SR_{13}	—	September 15, 2007	Kitt Peak	Spacewatch	·	1.7 km	MPC · JPL
476065	2007 SN_{14}	—	September 20, 2007	Lulin	LUSS	·	1.7 km	MPC · JPL
476066	2007 SY_{19}	—	September 18, 2007	Catalina	CSS	·	2.2 km	MPC · JPL
476067	2007 SF_{21}	—	September 25, 2007	Mount Lemmon	Mount Lemmon Survey	·	1.8 km	MPC · JPL
476068	2007 SL_{21}	—	September 20, 2007	Catalina	CSS	ADE	2.0 km	MPC · JPL
476069	2007 SQ_{21}	—	October 12, 2007	Socorro	LINEAR	·	1.9 km	MPC · JPL
476070	2007 SP_{22}	—	September 18, 2007	Kitt Peak	Spacewatch	·	2.1 km	MPC · JPL
476071	2007 TV_{4}	—	October 6, 2007	Prairie Grass	Mahony, J.	HOF	2.7 km	MPC · JPL
476072	2007 TV_{8}	—	October 6, 2007	Bergisch Gladbach	W. Bickel	·	1.6 km	MPC · JPL
476073	2007 TP_{18}	—	September 25, 2007	Mount Lemmon	Mount Lemmon Survey	·	1.8 km	MPC · JPL
476074	2007 TL_{19}	—	September 13, 2007	Catalina	CSS	·	1.7 km	MPC · JPL
476075	2007 TY_{21}	—	October 7, 2007	Kitt Peak	Spacewatch	·	2.4 km	MPC · JPL
476076	2007 TK_{25}	—	October 4, 2007	Kitt Peak	Spacewatch	·	1.8 km	MPC · JPL
476077	2007 TA_{29}	—	October 4, 2007	Kitt Peak	Spacewatch	·	2.2 km	MPC · JPL
476078	2007 TH_{30}	—	October 4, 2007	Kitt Peak	Spacewatch	·	1.9 km	MPC · JPL
476079	2007 TU_{30}	—	October 4, 2007	Kitt Peak	Spacewatch	HOF	2.2 km	MPC · JPL
476080	2007 TJ_{35}	—	October 7, 2007	Catalina	CSS	·	2.0 km	MPC · JPL
476081	2007 TS_{43}	—	September 25, 2007	Mount Lemmon	Mount Lemmon Survey	·	1.7 km	MPC · JPL
476082	2007 TK_{44}	—	October 7, 2007	Kitt Peak	Spacewatch	·	1.7 km	MPC · JPL
476083	2007 TX_{46}	—	October 4, 2007	Kitt Peak	Spacewatch	·	1.8 km	MPC · JPL
476084	2007 TZ_{47}	—	October 4, 2007	Kitt Peak	Spacewatch	·	2.1 km	MPC · JPL
476085	2007 TP_{48}	—	October 4, 2007	Kitt Peak	Spacewatch	·	1.3 km	MPC · JPL
476086	2007 TK_{52}	—	October 4, 2007	Kitt Peak	Spacewatch	·	1.8 km	MPC · JPL
476087	2007 TL_{52}	—	October 4, 2007	Kitt Peak	Spacewatch	·	1.6 km	MPC · JPL
476088	2007 TS_{55}	—	October 4, 2007	Kitt Peak	Spacewatch	·	1.6 km	MPC · JPL
476089	2007 TB_{58}	—	October 4, 2007	Kitt Peak	Spacewatch	·	2.0 km	MPC · JPL
476090	2007 TA_{61}	—	October 6, 2007	Kitt Peak	Spacewatch	(13314)	1.9 km	MPC · JPL
476091	2007 TB_{63}	—	October 7, 2007	Mount Lemmon	Mount Lemmon Survey	KOR	1.1 km	MPC · JPL
476092	2007 TP_{64}	—	October 7, 2007	Mount Lemmon	Mount Lemmon Survey	·	1.4 km	MPC · JPL
476093	2007 TC_{66}	—	October 12, 2007	Catalina	CSS	APO	430 m	MPC · JPL
476094	2007 TY_{75}	—	October 4, 2007	Kitt Peak	Spacewatch	·	1.3 km	MPC · JPL
476095	2007 TG_{88}	—	October 8, 2007	Mount Lemmon	Mount Lemmon Survey	·	1.6 km	MPC · JPL
476096	2007 TG_{98}	—	October 8, 2007	Mount Lemmon	Mount Lemmon Survey	·	2.0 km	MPC · JPL
476097	2007 TV_{113}	—	October 8, 2007	Anderson Mesa	LONEOS	DOR	2.3 km	MPC · JPL
476098	2007 TH_{115}	—	October 8, 2007	Anderson Mesa	LONEOS	·	2.3 km	MPC · JPL
476099	2007 TO_{123}	—	October 6, 2007	Kitt Peak	Spacewatch	·	1.4 km	MPC · JPL
476100	2007 TZ_{124}	—	October 6, 2007	Kitt Peak	Spacewatch	·	2.0 km	MPC · JPL

== 476101–476200 ==
back to top

Designation			Discovery			Properties		Ref
Permanent	Provisional	Named after	Date	Site	Discoverer(s)	Category	Diam.	Ref
476101	2007 TP_{126}	—	September 9, 2007	Mount Lemmon	Mount Lemmon Survey	·	1.4 km	MPC · JPL
476102	2007 TX_{129}	—	October 6, 2007	Kitt Peak	Spacewatch	HOF	2.3 km	MPC · JPL
476103	2007 TU_{138}	—	September 13, 2007	Catalina	CSS	·	2.2 km	MPC · JPL
476104	2007 TA_{147}	—	October 6, 2007	Kitt Peak	Spacewatch	·	1.6 km	MPC · JPL
476105	2007 TB_{149}	—	September 12, 2007	Mount Lemmon	Mount Lemmon Survey	AEO	1.1 km	MPC · JPL
476106	2007 TA_{155}	—	October 5, 2007	Kitt Peak	Spacewatch	·	2.1 km	MPC · JPL
476107	2007 TR_{155}	—	September 5, 2007	Mount Lemmon	Mount Lemmon Survey	·	2.5 km	MPC · JPL
476108	2007 TU_{156}	—	October 12, 2007	Kitt Peak	Spacewatch	JUN	1.1 km	MPC · JPL
476109	2007 TZ_{157}	—	September 12, 2007	Mount Lemmon	Mount Lemmon Survey	·	2.0 km	MPC · JPL
476110	2007 TF_{158}	—	October 9, 2007	Socorro	LINEAR	·	1.3 km	MPC · JPL
476111	2007 TD_{162}	—	September 14, 2007	Mount Lemmon	Mount Lemmon Survey	JUN	1.0 km	MPC · JPL
476112	2007 TG_{169}	—	October 12, 2007	Socorro	LINEAR	·	1.8 km	MPC · JPL
476113	2007 TG_{172}	—	October 10, 2007	Mount Lemmon	Mount Lemmon Survey	·	1.7 km	MPC · JPL
476114	2007 TT_{176}	—	September 15, 2007	Mount Lemmon	Mount Lemmon Survey	·	2.2 km	MPC · JPL
476115	2007 TL_{179}	—	October 7, 2007	Catalina	CSS	·	1.9 km	MPC · JPL
476116	2007 TN_{187}	—	October 16, 2007	Catalina	CSS	·	1.5 km	MPC · JPL
476117	2007 TK_{193}	—	October 6, 2007	Kitt Peak	Spacewatch	HOF	2.1 km	MPC · JPL
476118	2007 TU_{198}	—	October 8, 2007	Kitt Peak	Spacewatch	·	2.3 km	MPC · JPL
476119	2007 TM_{204}	—	October 8, 2007	Mount Lemmon	Mount Lemmon Survey	·	1.5 km	MPC · JPL
476120	2007 TU_{212}	—	October 7, 2007	Kitt Peak	Spacewatch	·	1.7 km	MPC · JPL
476121	2007 TC_{213}	—	September 25, 2007	Mount Lemmon	Mount Lemmon Survey	EUN	1.3 km	MPC · JPL
476122	2007 TO_{215}	—	October 7, 2007	Kitt Peak	Spacewatch	·	2.0 km	MPC · JPL
476123	2007 TA_{216}	—	October 7, 2007	Kitt Peak	Spacewatch	·	1.3 km	MPC · JPL
476124	2007 TU_{217}	—	September 14, 2007	Mount Lemmon	Mount Lemmon Survey	·	1.6 km	MPC · JPL
476125	2007 TS_{224}	—	October 11, 2007	Mount Lemmon	Mount Lemmon Survey	·	1.5 km	MPC · JPL
476126	2007 TQ_{225}	—	September 12, 2007	Mount Lemmon	Mount Lemmon Survey	·	1.8 km	MPC · JPL
476127	2007 TC_{227}	—	October 16, 1998	Kitt Peak	Spacewatch	EUN	870 m	MPC · JPL
476128	2007 TL_{227}	—	October 8, 2007	Kitt Peak	Spacewatch	·	1.5 km	MPC · JPL
476129	2007 TS_{228}	—	October 8, 2007	Kitt Peak	Spacewatch	·	1.6 km	MPC · JPL
476130	2007 TB_{230}	—	October 8, 2007	Catalina	CSS	·	2.2 km	MPC · JPL
476131	2007 TW_{232}	—	October 8, 2007	Kitt Peak	Spacewatch	·	1.6 km	MPC · JPL
476132	2007 TP_{237}	—	October 9, 2007	Mount Lemmon	Mount Lemmon Survey	·	1.7 km	MPC · JPL
476133	2007 TO_{240}	—	September 5, 2007	Catalina	CSS	·	2.0 km	MPC · JPL
476134	2007 TR_{241}	—	October 7, 2007	Mount Lemmon	Mount Lemmon Survey	·	1.9 km	MPC · JPL
476135	2007 TY_{245}	—	September 3, 2007	Catalina	CSS	·	1.7 km	MPC · JPL
476136	2007 TG_{249}	—	October 11, 2007	Mount Lemmon	Mount Lemmon Survey	·	1.7 km	MPC · JPL
476137	2007 TZ_{250}	—	October 11, 2007	Mount Lemmon	Mount Lemmon Survey	·	1.6 km	MPC · JPL
476138	2007 TK_{251}	—	October 11, 2007	Mount Lemmon	Mount Lemmon Survey	·	1.8 km	MPC · JPL
476139	2007 TJ_{262}	—	September 10, 2007	Mount Lemmon	Mount Lemmon Survey	·	1.9 km	MPC · JPL
476140	2007 TD_{268}	—	October 9, 2007	Kitt Peak	Spacewatch	·	1.9 km	MPC · JPL
476141	2007 TN_{288}	—	October 11, 2007	Catalina	CSS	AEO	1.1 km	MPC · JPL
476142	2007 TG_{291}	—	September 9, 2007	Kitt Peak	Spacewatch	·	1.5 km	MPC · JPL
476143	2007 TF_{295}	—	September 20, 2007	Kitt Peak	Spacewatch	·	1.8 km	MPC · JPL
476144	2007 TT_{296}	—	October 10, 2007	Mount Lemmon	Mount Lemmon Survey	·	2.0 km	MPC · JPL
476145	2007 TQ_{297}	—	August 10, 2007	Kitt Peak	Spacewatch	·	1.4 km	MPC · JPL
476146	2007 TK_{308}	—	October 9, 2007	Mount Lemmon	Mount Lemmon Survey	·	2.1 km	MPC · JPL
476147	2007 TV_{309}	—	September 12, 2007	Kitt Peak	Spacewatch	·	2.1 km	MPC · JPL
476148	2007 TS_{320}	—	October 13, 2007	Catalina	CSS	·	1.6 km	MPC · JPL
476149	2007 TK_{324}	—	October 11, 2007	Kitt Peak	Spacewatch	·	2.5 km	MPC · JPL
476150	2007 TG_{325}	—	October 11, 2007	Kitt Peak	Spacewatch	·	1.9 km	MPC · JPL
476151	2007 TB_{326}	—	October 11, 2007	Kitt Peak	Spacewatch	·	1.6 km	MPC · JPL
476152	2007 TQ_{328}	—	October 11, 2007	Kitt Peak	Spacewatch	·	1.5 km	MPC · JPL
476153	2007 TE_{333}	—	October 11, 2007	Kitt Peak	Spacewatch	AGN	1.1 km	MPC · JPL
476154	2007 TE_{334}	—	October 11, 2007	Kitt Peak	Spacewatch	·	2.4 km	MPC · JPL
476155	2007 TX_{343}	—	October 10, 2007	Mount Lemmon	Mount Lemmon Survey	·	1.6 km	MPC · JPL
476156	2007 TA_{346}	—	September 18, 2007	Kitt Peak	Spacewatch	·	2.1 km	MPC · JPL
476157	2007 TU_{354}	—	September 5, 2007	Catalina	CSS	·	2.0 km	MPC · JPL
476158	2007 TU_{357}	—	October 14, 2007	Mount Lemmon	Mount Lemmon Survey	AEO	1.0 km	MPC · JPL
476159	2007 TU_{364}	—	October 15, 2007	Mount Lemmon	Mount Lemmon Survey	·	2.1 km	MPC · JPL
476160	2007 TH_{368}	—	October 10, 2007	Mount Lemmon	Mount Lemmon Survey	·	1.8 km	MPC · JPL
476161	2007 TG_{371}	—	October 12, 2007	Mount Lemmon	Mount Lemmon Survey	·	1.9 km	MPC · JPL
476162	2007 TE_{374}	—	October 14, 2007	Bergisch Gladbach	W. Bickel	·	2.3 km	MPC · JPL
476163	2007 TB_{379}	—	October 13, 2007	Catalina	CSS	·	1.6 km	MPC · JPL
476164	2007 TO_{383}	—	October 6, 2007	Kitt Peak	Spacewatch	AGN	1.1 km	MPC · JPL
476165	2007 TX_{384}	—	October 14, 2007	Mount Lemmon	Mount Lemmon Survey	DOR	2.0 km	MPC · JPL
476166	2007 TC_{385}	—	October 14, 2007	Mount Lemmon	Mount Lemmon Survey	·	2.2 km	MPC · JPL
476167	2007 TZ_{391}	—	October 15, 2007	Catalina	CSS	·	1.6 km	MPC · JPL
476168	2007 TC_{398}	—	October 15, 2007	Kitt Peak	Spacewatch	·	1.8 km	MPC · JPL
476169	2007 TQ_{402}	—	October 15, 2007	Mount Lemmon	Mount Lemmon Survey	·	1.7 km	MPC · JPL
476170	2007 TP_{414}	—	October 10, 2007	Catalina	CSS	·	2.0 km	MPC · JPL
476171	2007 TQ_{420}	—	September 20, 2007	Catalina	CSS	·	1.9 km	MPC · JPL
476172	2007 TZ_{424}	—	October 8, 2007	Kitt Peak	Spacewatch	·	1.6 km	MPC · JPL
476173	2007 TB_{427}	—	October 10, 2007	Kitt Peak	Spacewatch	·	1.6 km	MPC · JPL
476174	2007 TH_{427}	—	October 10, 2007	Kitt Peak	Spacewatch	·	1.7 km	MPC · JPL
476175	2007 TZ_{428}	—	October 12, 2007	Kitt Peak	Spacewatch	·	2.0 km	MPC · JPL
476176	2007 TD_{432}	—	October 4, 2007	Kitt Peak	Spacewatch	·	1.7 km	MPC · JPL
476177	2007 TK_{432}	—	October 4, 2007	Kitt Peak	Spacewatch	AGN	970 m	MPC · JPL
476178	2007 TH_{438}	—	October 7, 2007	Mount Lemmon	Mount Lemmon Survey	·	2.2 km	MPC · JPL
476179	2007 TM_{440}	—	October 15, 2007	Mount Lemmon	Mount Lemmon Survey	·	1.7 km	MPC · JPL
476180	2007 TM_{441}	—	September 25, 2007	Mount Lemmon	Mount Lemmon Survey	·	1.9 km	MPC · JPL
476181	2007 TS_{447}	—	November 12, 2007	Socorro	LINEAR	·	1.8 km	MPC · JPL
476182	2007 TV_{449}	—	October 10, 2007	Mount Lemmon	Mount Lemmon Survey	·	1.6 km	MPC · JPL
476183	2007 TW_{449}	—	October 10, 2007	Kitt Peak	Spacewatch	AGN	1.2 km	MPC · JPL
476184	2007 TY_{451}	—	October 12, 2007	Socorro	LINEAR	·	1.9 km	MPC · JPL
476185	2007 TO_{452}	—	October 9, 2007	Kitt Peak	Spacewatch	DOR	2.1 km	MPC · JPL
476186	2007 UN_{8}	—	October 16, 2007	Catalina	CSS	·	1.7 km	MPC · JPL
476187	2007 UQ_{13}	—	October 30, 2007	Mount Lemmon	Mount Lemmon Survey	APO	340 m	MPC · JPL
476188	2007 UT_{17}	—	October 18, 2007	Kitt Peak	Spacewatch	HOF	2.6 km	MPC · JPL
476189	2007 UP_{24}	—	October 8, 2007	Mount Lemmon	Mount Lemmon Survey	AEO	1.0 km	MPC · JPL
476190	2007 UR_{26}	—	October 16, 2007	Mount Lemmon	Mount Lemmon Survey	·	1.8 km	MPC · JPL
476191	2007 UP_{28}	—	October 16, 2007	Kitt Peak	Spacewatch	·	1.6 km	MPC · JPL
476192	2007 UO_{40}	—	October 8, 2007	Kitt Peak	Spacewatch	·	2.1 km	MPC · JPL
476193	2007 US_{40}	—	October 16, 2007	Kitt Peak	Spacewatch	NEM	1.8 km	MPC · JPL
476194	2007 UH_{41}	—	October 16, 2007	Kitt Peak	Spacewatch	HOF	2.2 km	MPC · JPL
476195	2007 UJ_{41}	—	September 12, 2007	Mount Lemmon	Mount Lemmon Survey	GEF	1.3 km	MPC · JPL
476196	2007 UB_{43}	—	October 18, 2007	Kitt Peak	Spacewatch	AGN	1.1 km	MPC · JPL
476197	2007 UW_{45}	—	October 19, 2007	Kitt Peak	Spacewatch	·	1.9 km	MPC · JPL
476198	2007 UD_{46}	—	October 20, 2007	Catalina	CSS	·	2.1 km	MPC · JPL
476199	2007 UY_{51}	—	October 24, 2007	Mount Lemmon	Mount Lemmon Survey	·	2.3 km	MPC · JPL
476200	2007 UX_{55}	—	October 7, 2007	Kitt Peak	Spacewatch	·	1.4 km	MPC · JPL

== 476201–476300 ==
back to top

Designation			Discovery			Properties		Ref
Permanent	Provisional	Named after	Date	Site	Discoverer(s)	Category	Diam.	Ref
476201	2007 UD_{58}	—	October 30, 2007	Mount Lemmon	Mount Lemmon Survey	·	1.0 km	MPC · JPL
476202	2007 UE_{59}	—	October 10, 2007	Kitt Peak	Spacewatch	AEO	870 m	MPC · JPL
476203	2007 UP_{60}	—	September 18, 2007	Mount Lemmon	Mount Lemmon Survey	·	1.5 km	MPC · JPL
476204	2007 US_{62}	—	October 30, 2007	Mount Lemmon	Mount Lemmon Survey	·	1.3 km	MPC · JPL
476205	2007 UD_{71}	—	October 18, 2007	Kitt Peak	Spacewatch	·	2.0 km	MPC · JPL
476206	2007 UO_{74}	—	October 21, 2007	Kitt Peak	Spacewatch	·	1.6 km	MPC · JPL
476207	2007 UH_{78}	—	October 17, 2007	Mount Lemmon	Mount Lemmon Survey	ADE	2.1 km	MPC · JPL
476208	2007 UE_{87}	—	October 30, 2007	Kitt Peak	Spacewatch	·	2.2 km	MPC · JPL
476209	2007 UL_{89}	—	October 30, 2007	Mount Lemmon	Mount Lemmon Survey	·	1.4 km	MPC · JPL
476210	2007 UC_{91}	—	October 18, 2007	Kitt Peak	Spacewatch	KOR	1.1 km	MPC · JPL
476211	2007 UY_{93}	—	October 31, 2007	Mount Lemmon	Mount Lemmon Survey	·	1.7 km	MPC · JPL
476212	2007 UX_{97}	—	October 30, 2007	Mount Lemmon	Mount Lemmon Survey	·	1.6 km	MPC · JPL
476213	2007 UN_{102}	—	October 30, 2007	Mount Lemmon	Mount Lemmon Survey	AGN	1.0 km	MPC · JPL
476214	2007 UT_{102}	—	October 30, 2007	Mount Lemmon	Mount Lemmon Survey	HOF	2.4 km	MPC · JPL
476215	2007 US_{107}	—	October 30, 2007	Kitt Peak	Spacewatch	fast	1.5 km	MPC · JPL
476216	2007 UX_{109}	—	October 30, 2007	Mount Lemmon	Mount Lemmon Survey	HOF	2.2 km	MPC · JPL
476217	2007 UP_{112}	—	October 4, 2007	Kitt Peak	Spacewatch	·	1.9 km	MPC · JPL
476218	2007 UU_{114}	—	October 31, 2007	Kitt Peak	Spacewatch	·	1.8 km	MPC · JPL
476219	2007 US_{116}	—	October 10, 2007	Catalina	CSS	·	2.0 km	MPC · JPL
476220	2007 UK_{129}	—	October 21, 2007	Mount Lemmon	Mount Lemmon Survey	·	1.8 km	MPC · JPL
476221	2007 UA_{130}	—	October 16, 2007	Catalina	CSS	JUN	880 m	MPC · JPL
476222	2007 UM_{131}	—	October 16, 2007	Mount Lemmon	Mount Lemmon Survey	AGN	950 m	MPC · JPL
476223	2007 UW_{134}	—	October 30, 2007	Kitt Peak	Spacewatch	·	1.7 km	MPC · JPL
476224	2007 UW_{136}	—	October 24, 2007	Mount Lemmon	Mount Lemmon Survey	·	1.6 km	MPC · JPL
476225	2007 UT_{140}	—	October 20, 2007	Mount Lemmon	Mount Lemmon Survey	·	2.3 km	MPC · JPL
476226	2007 VU_{16}	—	October 10, 2007	Kitt Peak	Spacewatch	·	1.2 km	MPC · JPL
476227	2007 VX_{18}	—	November 1, 2007	Mount Lemmon	Mount Lemmon Survey	·	1.5 km	MPC · JPL
476228	2007 VU_{20}	—	October 13, 2007	Mount Lemmon	Mount Lemmon Survey	·	1.6 km	MPC · JPL
476229	2007 VZ_{20}	—	November 2, 2007	Mount Lemmon	Mount Lemmon Survey	·	1.6 km	MPC · JPL
476230	2007 VC_{24}	—	November 2, 2007	Mount Lemmon	Mount Lemmon Survey	·	1.9 km	MPC · JPL
476231	2007 VT_{25}	—	October 18, 2007	Kitt Peak	Spacewatch	·	1.5 km	MPC · JPL
476232	2007 VO_{29}	—	October 9, 2007	Kitt Peak	Spacewatch	·	1.6 km	MPC · JPL
476233	2007 VW_{31}	—	November 2, 2007	Kitt Peak	Spacewatch	·	1.9 km	MPC · JPL
476234	2007 VJ_{34}	—	September 15, 2007	Mount Lemmon	Mount Lemmon Survey	(13314)	1.4 km	MPC · JPL
476235	2007 VE_{35}	—	October 20, 2007	Mount Lemmon	Mount Lemmon Survey	·	1.9 km	MPC · JPL
476236	2007 VY_{36}	—	October 10, 2007	Kitt Peak	Spacewatch	·	1.9 km	MPC · JPL
476237	2007 VD_{41}	—	October 18, 2007	Kitt Peak	Spacewatch	AGN	980 m	MPC · JPL
476238	2007 VF_{57}	—	November 1, 2007	Kitt Peak	Spacewatch	·	1.9 km	MPC · JPL
476239	2007 VP_{57}	—	November 1, 2007	Kitt Peak	Spacewatch	AGN	1.1 km	MPC · JPL
476240	2007 VW_{61}	—	November 1, 2007	Kitt Peak	Spacewatch	·	1.5 km	MPC · JPL
476241	2007 VH_{64}	—	November 1, 2007	Kitt Peak	Spacewatch	·	2.0 km	MPC · JPL
476242	2007 VT_{65}	—	November 2, 2007	Mount Lemmon	Mount Lemmon Survey	(17392)	1.2 km	MPC · JPL
476243	2007 VJ_{66}	—	September 14, 2007	Mount Lemmon	Mount Lemmon Survey	·	1.5 km	MPC · JPL
476244	2007 VL_{67}	—	November 3, 2007	Kitt Peak	Spacewatch	·	2.0 km	MPC · JPL
476245	2007 VC_{69}	—	September 14, 2007	Mount Lemmon	Mount Lemmon Survey	HOF	2.2 km	MPC · JPL
476246	2007 VT_{74}	—	November 3, 2007	Kitt Peak	Spacewatch	·	1.6 km	MPC · JPL
476247	2007 VT_{76}	—	October 12, 2007	Kitt Peak	Spacewatch	·	1.5 km	MPC · JPL
476248	2007 VB_{77}	—	October 8, 2007	Kitt Peak	Spacewatch	AGN	900 m	MPC · JPL
476249	2007 VV_{77}	—	November 3, 2007	Kitt Peak	Spacewatch	·	1.7 km	MPC · JPL
476250	2007 VU_{79}	—	November 3, 2007	Kitt Peak	Spacewatch	·	1.9 km	MPC · JPL
476251	2007 VU_{84}	—	October 10, 2007	Kitt Peak	Spacewatch	·	1.5 km	MPC · JPL
476252	2007 VG_{91}	—	October 19, 2007	Kitt Peak	Spacewatch	·	1.9 km	MPC · JPL
476253	2007 VJ_{94}	—	November 4, 2007	Kitt Peak	Spacewatch	·	1.8 km	MPC · JPL
476254	2007 VG_{97}	—	November 1, 2007	Kitt Peak	Spacewatch	BRA	1.6 km	MPC · JPL
476255	2007 VW_{97}	—	November 1, 2007	Kitt Peak	Spacewatch	AGN	1.2 km	MPC · JPL
476256	2007 VC_{99}	—	November 2, 2007	Mount Lemmon	Mount Lemmon Survey	·	1.7 km	MPC · JPL
476257	2007 VE_{103}	—	September 12, 2007	Mount Lemmon	Mount Lemmon Survey	·	1.8 km	MPC · JPL
476258	2007 VF_{103}	—	November 3, 2007	Kitt Peak	Spacewatch	·	1.7 km	MPC · JPL
476259	2007 VJ_{103}	—	October 9, 2007	Mount Lemmon	Mount Lemmon Survey	·	1.5 km	MPC · JPL
476260	2007 VS_{104}	—	November 3, 2007	Kitt Peak	Spacewatch	·	1.9 km	MPC · JPL
476261	2007 VS_{110}	—	November 3, 2007	Kitt Peak	Spacewatch	·	1.8 km	MPC · JPL
476262	2007 VC_{117}	—	November 3, 2007	Kitt Peak	Spacewatch	·	1.8 km	MPC · JPL
476263	2007 VN_{124}	—	November 5, 2007	Mount Lemmon	Mount Lemmon Survey	·	1.5 km	MPC · JPL
476264	2007 VX_{124}	—	November 5, 2007	Mount Lemmon	Mount Lemmon Survey	KOR	1.3 km	MPC · JPL
476265	2007 VO_{142}	—	November 4, 2007	Kitt Peak	Spacewatch	HOF	2.7 km	MPC · JPL
476266	2007 VV_{145}	—	November 4, 2007	Kitt Peak	Spacewatch	·	1.7 km	MPC · JPL
476267	2007 VF_{154}	—	September 12, 2007	Mount Lemmon	Mount Lemmon Survey	WIT	950 m	MPC · JPL
476268	2007 VH_{158}	—	November 5, 2007	Kitt Peak	Spacewatch	·	1.4 km	MPC · JPL
476269	2007 VM_{160}	—	October 20, 2007	Mount Lemmon	Mount Lemmon Survey	·	2.3 km	MPC · JPL
476270	2007 VC_{161}	—	November 5, 2007	Kitt Peak	Spacewatch	AGN	1.1 km	MPC · JPL
476271	2007 VG_{163}	—	November 5, 2007	Kitt Peak	Spacewatch	KOR	1.2 km	MPC · JPL
476272	2007 VT_{168}	—	November 5, 2007	Kitt Peak	Spacewatch	·	1.6 km	MPC · JPL
476273	2007 VZ_{177}	—	November 7, 2007	Mount Lemmon	Mount Lemmon Survey	KOR	1.1 km	MPC · JPL
476274	2007 VQ_{178}	—	November 7, 2007	Mount Lemmon	Mount Lemmon Survey	·	1.5 km	MPC · JPL
476275	2007 VF_{183}	—	November 8, 2007	Catalina	CSS	·	1.6 km	MPC · JPL
476276	2007 VV_{195}	—	November 7, 2007	Mount Lemmon	Mount Lemmon Survey	·	1.6 km	MPC · JPL
476277	2007 VH_{199}	—	November 9, 2007	Mount Lemmon	Mount Lemmon Survey	KOR	1.2 km	MPC · JPL
476278	2007 VZ_{213}	—	October 20, 2007	Mount Lemmon	Mount Lemmon Survey	AGN	1.0 km	MPC · JPL
476279	2007 VB_{218}	—	November 5, 2007	Kitt Peak	Spacewatch	KOR	1.3 km	MPC · JPL
476280	2007 VD_{218}	—	November 9, 2007	Kitt Peak	Spacewatch	GEF	1.1 km	MPC · JPL
476281	2007 VL_{222}	—	October 13, 2007	Kitt Peak	Spacewatch	·	1.7 km	MPC · JPL
476282	2007 VT_{225}	—	October 18, 2007	Kitt Peak	Spacewatch	·	1.5 km	MPC · JPL
476283	2007 VN_{227}	—	November 3, 2007	Kitt Peak	Spacewatch	KOR	1.1 km	MPC · JPL
476284	2007 VB_{231}	—	November 3, 2007	Kitt Peak	Spacewatch	·	1.6 km	MPC · JPL
476285	2007 VJ_{238}	—	October 16, 2007	Mount Lemmon	Mount Lemmon Survey	·	2.1 km	MPC · JPL
476286	2007 VW_{239}	—	November 5, 2007	Kitt Peak	Spacewatch	·	1.8 km	MPC · JPL
476287	2007 VG_{242}	—	November 5, 2007	Catalina	CSS	DOR	2.2 km	MPC · JPL
476288	2007 VM_{244}	—	November 15, 2007	La Sagra	OAM	·	1.6 km	MPC · JPL
476289	2007 VU_{256}	—	November 13, 2007	Mount Lemmon	Mount Lemmon Survey	·	1.5 km	MPC · JPL
476290	2007 VT_{263}	—	November 13, 2007	Mount Lemmon	Mount Lemmon Survey	·	1.8 km	MPC · JPL
476291	2007 VS_{284}	—	November 14, 2007	Kitt Peak	Spacewatch	·	1.6 km	MPC · JPL
476292	2007 VG_{295}	—	October 19, 2007	Kitt Peak	Spacewatch	·	1.7 km	MPC · JPL
476293	2007 VY_{307}	—	November 5, 2007	Kitt Peak	Spacewatch	·	2.0 km	MPC · JPL
476294	2007 VZ_{310}	—	November 8, 2007	Mount Lemmon	Mount Lemmon Survey	·	1.8 km	MPC · JPL
476295	2007 VW_{315}	—	November 8, 2007	Kitt Peak	Spacewatch	·	1.8 km	MPC · JPL
476296	2007 VE_{319}	—	November 3, 2007	Kitt Peak	Spacewatch	KOR	1.3 km	MPC · JPL
476297	2007 VZ_{321}	—	November 8, 2007	Catalina	CSS	·	3.8 km	MPC · JPL
476298	2007 VQ_{325}	—	November 8, 2007	Socorro	LINEAR	·	1.7 km	MPC · JPL
476299	2007 VV_{326}	—	November 4, 2007	Kitt Peak	Spacewatch	·	1.9 km	MPC · JPL
476300	2007 VQ_{328}	—	November 19, 2007	Mount Lemmon	Mount Lemmon Survey	·	1.7 km	MPC · JPL

== 476301–476400 ==
back to top

Designation			Discovery			Properties		Ref
Permanent	Provisional	Named after	Date	Site	Discoverer(s)	Category	Diam.	Ref
476301	2007 VZ_{332}	—	November 9, 2007	Socorro	LINEAR	·	2.1 km	MPC · JPL
476302	2007 VD_{334}	—	November 12, 2007	Mount Lemmon	Mount Lemmon Survey	·	2.5 km	MPC · JPL
476303	2007 VW_{334}	—	November 14, 2007	Mount Lemmon	Mount Lemmon Survey	·	1.8 km	MPC · JPL
476304	2007 VH_{335}	—	November 8, 2007	Mount Lemmon	Mount Lemmon Survey	·	1.9 km	MPC · JPL
476305	2007 WO_{26}	—	November 18, 2007	Mount Lemmon	Mount Lemmon Survey	·	2.9 km	MPC · JPL
476306	2007 WW_{30}	—	November 19, 2007	Kitt Peak	Spacewatch	·	3.2 km	MPC · JPL
476307	2007 WU_{31}	—	November 2, 2007	Kitt Peak	Spacewatch	·	1.7 km	MPC · JPL
476308	2007 WL_{34}	—	November 4, 2007	Kitt Peak	Spacewatch	·	1.8 km	MPC · JPL
476309	2007 WD_{62}	—	November 17, 2007	Kitt Peak	Spacewatch	·	2.3 km	MPC · JPL
476310	2007 XA_{13}	—	November 4, 2007	Kitt Peak	Spacewatch	·	1.7 km	MPC · JPL
476311	2007 XF_{17}	—	December 5, 2007	Kitt Peak	Spacewatch	·	2.3 km	MPC · JPL
476312	2007 XQ_{18}	—	November 5, 2007	Kitt Peak	Spacewatch	·	1.9 km	MPC · JPL
476313	2007 XE_{21}	—	November 1, 2007	Kitt Peak	Spacewatch	AGN	1.1 km	MPC · JPL
476314	2007 XU_{32}	—	November 5, 2007	Mount Lemmon	Mount Lemmon Survey	·	650 m	MPC · JPL
476315	2007 XM_{33}	—	November 3, 2007	Kitt Peak	Spacewatch	·	2.2 km	MPC · JPL
476316	2007 XT_{43}	—	December 5, 2007	Kitt Peak	Spacewatch	·	1.9 km	MPC · JPL
476317	2007 XC_{44}	—	December 15, 2007	Kitt Peak	Spacewatch	·	2.5 km	MPC · JPL
476318	2007 XG_{55}	—	December 15, 2007	Kitt Peak	Spacewatch	·	600 m	MPC · JPL
476319	2007 XW_{55}	—	October 21, 2007	Mount Lemmon	Mount Lemmon Survey	·	2.3 km	MPC · JPL
476320	2007 YE_{2}	—	December 16, 2007	La Sagra	OAM	·	2.3 km	MPC · JPL
476321	2007 YX_{3}	—	December 17, 2007	Piszkéstető	K. Sárneczky	GEF	1.1 km	MPC · JPL
476322	2007 YZ_{5}	—	October 14, 2007	Mount Lemmon	Mount Lemmon Survey	AGN	1.2 km	MPC · JPL
476323	2007 YL_{7}	—	December 16, 2007	Kitt Peak	Spacewatch	·	1.2 km	MPC · JPL
476324	2007 YQ_{10}	—	December 16, 2007	Mount Lemmon	Mount Lemmon Survey	EOS	1.7 km	MPC · JPL
476325	2007 YG_{26}	—	December 18, 2007	Mount Lemmon	Mount Lemmon Survey	·	2.1 km	MPC · JPL
476326	2007 YX_{28}	—	December 19, 2007	Kitt Peak	Spacewatch	·	1.7 km	MPC · JPL
476327	2007 YM_{41}	—	December 30, 2007	Kitt Peak	Spacewatch	EOS	2.2 km	MPC · JPL
476328	2007 YW_{63}	—	December 31, 2007	Kitt Peak	Spacewatch	·	830 m	MPC · JPL
476329	2007 YS_{65}	—	December 31, 2007	Mount Lemmon	Mount Lemmon Survey	·	910 m	MPC · JPL
476330	2007 YV_{66}	—	December 30, 2007	Kitt Peak	Spacewatch	·	1.9 km	MPC · JPL
476331	2008 AW_{20}	—	January 10, 2008	Mount Lemmon	Mount Lemmon Survey	·	3.6 km	MPC · JPL
476332	2008 AT_{31}	—	November 7, 2007	Mount Lemmon	Mount Lemmon Survey	·	2.5 km	MPC · JPL
476333	2008 AW_{36}	—	December 31, 2007	Catalina	CSS	·	2.9 km	MPC · JPL
476334	2008 AR_{37}	—	January 10, 2008	Kitt Peak	Spacewatch	·	510 m	MPC · JPL
476335	2008 AP_{43}	—	November 18, 2007	Mount Lemmon	Mount Lemmon Survey	·	3.3 km	MPC · JPL
476336	2008 AQ_{44}	—	November 18, 2007	Mount Lemmon	Mount Lemmon Survey	·	2.1 km	MPC · JPL
476337	2008 AY_{44}	—	January 10, 2008	Kitt Peak	Spacewatch	·	3.2 km	MPC · JPL
476338	2008 AB_{53}	—	January 11, 2008	Kitt Peak	Spacewatch	·	2.2 km	MPC · JPL
476339	2008 AS_{72}	—	January 15, 2008	Socorro	LINEAR	·	2.0 km	MPC · JPL
476340	2008 AQ_{73}	—	January 10, 2008	Mount Lemmon	Mount Lemmon Survey	615	1.4 km	MPC · JPL
476341	2008 AZ_{75}	—	December 18, 2007	Mount Lemmon	Mount Lemmon Survey	·	2.1 km	MPC · JPL
476342	2008 AT_{83}	—	November 11, 2007	Mount Lemmon	Mount Lemmon Survey	·	2.5 km	MPC · JPL
476343	2008 AC_{98}	—	January 14, 2008	Kitt Peak	Spacewatch	·	850 m	MPC · JPL
476344	2008 AM_{98}	—	January 14, 2008	Kitt Peak	Spacewatch	·	2.6 km	MPC · JPL
476345	2008 AV_{105}	—	December 4, 2007	Mount Lemmon	Mount Lemmon Survey	·	2.2 km	MPC · JPL
476346	2008 AO_{111}	—	December 14, 2007	Mount Lemmon	Mount Lemmon Survey	·	1.9 km	MPC · JPL
476347	2008 AS_{117}	—	January 10, 2008	Mount Lemmon	Mount Lemmon Survey	·	1.7 km	MPC · JPL
476348	2008 AT_{123}	—	January 6, 2008	Mauna Kea	P. A. Wiegert	·	1.3 km	MPC · JPL
476349	2008 AC_{127}	—	January 1, 2008	Kitt Peak	Spacewatch	EOS	1.4 km	MPC · JPL
476350	2008 AE_{127}	—	January 1, 2008	Mount Lemmon	Mount Lemmon Survey	·	1.7 km	MPC · JPL
476351	2008 AZ_{127}	—	January 11, 2008	Mount Lemmon	Mount Lemmon Survey	·	2.3 km	MPC · JPL
476352	2008 AK_{134}	—	January 1, 2008	Kitt Peak	Spacewatch	EOS	2.0 km	MPC · JPL
476353	2008 BZ_{1}	—	January 11, 2008	Catalina	CSS	·	3.0 km	MPC · JPL
476354	2008 BN_{3}	—	January 16, 2008	Kitt Peak	Spacewatch	·	1.7 km	MPC · JPL
476355	2008 BV_{12}	—	January 18, 2008	Kitt Peak	Spacewatch	H	560 m	MPC · JPL
476356	2008 BR_{14}	—	November 11, 2007	Mount Lemmon	Mount Lemmon Survey	KOR	1.5 km	MPC · JPL
476357	2008 BX_{22}	—	January 31, 2008	Mount Lemmon	Mount Lemmon Survey	·	3.1 km	MPC · JPL
476358	2008 BO_{33}	—	January 30, 2008	Kitt Peak	Spacewatch	EOS	2.0 km	MPC · JPL
476359	2008 BR_{38}	—	December 20, 2007	Mount Lemmon	Mount Lemmon Survey	EOS	1.8 km	MPC · JPL
476360	2008 BA_{40}	—	January 30, 2008	Catalina	CSS	·	1.9 km	MPC · JPL
476361	2008 BP_{46}	—	January 30, 2008	Mount Lemmon	Mount Lemmon Survey	·	2.7 km	MPC · JPL
476362	2008 BS_{46}	—	January 30, 2008	Mount Lemmon	Mount Lemmon Survey	·	710 m	MPC · JPL
476363	2008 BJ_{49}	—	January 18, 2008	Kitt Peak	Spacewatch	·	1.4 km	MPC · JPL
476364	2008 BP_{49}	—	January 30, 2008	Mount Lemmon	Mount Lemmon Survey	·	2.6 km	MPC · JPL
476365	2008 CX_{2}	—	February 1, 2008	Mount Lemmon	Mount Lemmon Survey	·	3.9 km	MPC · JPL
476366	2008 CW_{11}	—	February 3, 2008	Kitt Peak	Spacewatch	EOS	2.1 km	MPC · JPL
476367	2008 CH_{14}	—	February 3, 2008	Kitt Peak	Spacewatch	·	4.0 km	MPC · JPL
476368	2008 CE_{19}	—	February 3, 2008	Kitt Peak	Spacewatch	·	750 m	MPC · JPL
476369	2008 CL_{26}	—	January 10, 2008	Mount Lemmon	Mount Lemmon Survey	·	2.1 km	MPC · JPL
476370	2008 CB_{27}	—	January 10, 2008	Mount Lemmon	Mount Lemmon Survey	·	560 m	MPC · JPL
476371	2008 CY_{33}	—	October 22, 2006	Kitt Peak	Spacewatch	·	1.4 km	MPC · JPL
476372	2008 CL_{34}	—	February 2, 2008	Kitt Peak	Spacewatch	·	2.8 km	MPC · JPL
476373	2008 CO_{35}	—	February 2, 2008	Kitt Peak	Spacewatch	·	590 m	MPC · JPL
476374	2008 CS_{35}	—	February 2, 2008	Kitt Peak	Spacewatch	·	2.7 km	MPC · JPL
476375	2008 CK_{36}	—	February 2, 2008	Kitt Peak	Spacewatch	·	2.8 km	MPC · JPL
476376	2008 CT_{36}	—	February 2, 2008	Kitt Peak	Spacewatch	·	650 m	MPC · JPL
476377	2008 CD_{41}	—	February 2, 2008	Kitt Peak	Spacewatch	·	660 m	MPC · JPL
476378	2008 CD_{43}	—	February 2, 2008	Kitt Peak	Spacewatch	·	2.8 km	MPC · JPL
476379	2008 CG_{48}	—	February 3, 2008	Kitt Peak	Spacewatch	·	2.5 km	MPC · JPL
476380	2008 CH_{48}	—	February 3, 2008	Kitt Peak	Spacewatch	EOS	1.5 km	MPC · JPL
476381	2008 CS_{50}	—	January 1, 2008	Mount Lemmon	Mount Lemmon Survey	·	2.6 km	MPC · JPL
476382	2008 CO_{54}	—	January 14, 2008	Kitt Peak	Spacewatch	·	3.0 km	MPC · JPL
476383	2008 CQ_{68}	—	January 11, 2008	Kitt Peak	Spacewatch	·	2.3 km	MPC · JPL
476384	2008 CC_{69}	—	January 20, 2008	Kitt Peak	Spacewatch	TEL	1.4 km	MPC · JPL
476385	2008 CH_{71}	—	December 5, 2007	Mount Lemmon	Mount Lemmon Survey	·	3.5 km	MPC · JPL
476386	2008 CX_{76}	—	February 6, 2008	Catalina	CSS	·	3.3 km	MPC · JPL
476387	2008 CS_{90}	—	February 8, 2008	Kitt Peak	Spacewatch	·	2.2 km	MPC · JPL
476388	2008 CL_{108}	—	February 9, 2008	Catalina	CSS	·	2.3 km	MPC · JPL
476389	2008 CG_{127}	—	January 31, 2008	Mount Lemmon	Mount Lemmon Survey	·	2.8 km	MPC · JPL
476390	2008 CZ_{133}	—	January 12, 2008	Kitt Peak	Spacewatch	EOS	1.9 km	MPC · JPL
476391	2008 CQ_{136}	—	January 10, 2008	Kitt Peak	Spacewatch	·	530 m	MPC · JPL
476392	2008 CW_{149}	—	February 9, 2008	Kitt Peak	Spacewatch	·	700 m	MPC · JPL
476393	2008 CD_{163}	—	February 2, 2008	Kitt Peak	Spacewatch	VER	2.6 km	MPC · JPL
476394	2008 CJ_{164}	—	January 12, 2008	Mount Lemmon	Mount Lemmon Survey	·	2.1 km	MPC · JPL
476395	2008 CQ_{171}	—	February 12, 2008	Mount Lemmon	Mount Lemmon Survey	·	2.4 km	MPC · JPL
476396	2008 CP_{182}	—	February 11, 2008	Mount Lemmon	Mount Lemmon Survey	·	1 km	MPC · JPL
476397	2008 CE_{191}	—	February 2, 2008	Kitt Peak	Spacewatch	·	700 m	MPC · JPL
476398	2008 CQ_{191}	—	February 2, 2008	Kitt Peak	Spacewatch	EOS	1.8 km	MPC · JPL
476399	2008 CR_{196}	—	February 7, 2008	Mount Lemmon	Mount Lemmon Survey	·	2.4 km	MPC · JPL
476400	2008 CC_{200}	—	February 9, 2008	Catalina	CSS	·	2.8 km	MPC · JPL

== 476401–476500 ==
back to top

Designation			Discovery			Properties		Ref
Permanent	Provisional	Named after	Date	Site	Discoverer(s)	Category	Diam.	Ref
476401	2008 CF_{203}	—	February 10, 2008	Mount Lemmon	Mount Lemmon Survey	·	3.0 km	MPC · JPL
476402	2008 CE_{205}	—	February 11, 2008	Mount Lemmon	Mount Lemmon Survey	·	630 m	MPC · JPL
476403	2008 CE_{207}	—	February 12, 2008	Kitt Peak	Spacewatch	·	3.4 km	MPC · JPL
476404	2008 CG_{207}	—	February 13, 2008	Kitt Peak	Spacewatch	·	1.8 km	MPC · JPL
476405	2008 CK_{207}	—	February 13, 2008	Kitt Peak	Spacewatch	·	2.3 km	MPC · JPL
476406	2008 CO_{207}	—	February 13, 2008	Kitt Peak	Spacewatch	·	2.4 km	MPC · JPL
476407	2008 CW_{207}	—	February 10, 2008	Kitt Peak	Spacewatch	·	1.8 km	MPC · JPL
476408	2008 CU_{210}	—	February 2, 2008	Kitt Peak	Spacewatch	·	2.8 km	MPC · JPL
476409	2008 CU_{212}	—	February 8, 2008	Mount Lemmon	Mount Lemmon Survey	·	800 m	MPC · JPL
476410	2008 DY_{1}	—	September 13, 2005	Kitt Peak	Spacewatch	·	3.2 km	MPC · JPL
476411	2008 DK_{3}	—	February 8, 2008	Kitt Peak	Spacewatch	·	1.6 km	MPC · JPL
476412	2008 DQ_{3}	—	January 30, 2008	Mount Lemmon	Mount Lemmon Survey	·	1.7 km	MPC · JPL
476413	2008 DD_{13}	—	February 7, 2008	Kitt Peak	Spacewatch	·	2.7 km	MPC · JPL
476414	2008 DT_{17}	—	February 26, 2008	Mount Lemmon	Mount Lemmon Survey	·	2.5 km	MPC · JPL
476415	2008 DX_{20}	—	February 28, 2008	Mount Lemmon	Mount Lemmon Survey	·	940 m	MPC · JPL
476416	2008 DC_{26}	—	February 29, 2008	Purple Mountain	PMO NEO Survey Program	·	950 m	MPC · JPL
476417	2008 DO_{28}	—	January 10, 2008	Mount Lemmon	Mount Lemmon Survey	·	2.4 km	MPC · JPL
476418	2008 DO_{29}	—	January 19, 2008	Kitt Peak	Spacewatch	·	2.1 km	MPC · JPL
476419	2008 DS_{31}	—	February 2, 2008	Kitt Peak	Spacewatch	EOS	1.7 km	MPC · JPL
476420	2008 DP_{32}	—	February 27, 2008	Kitt Peak	Spacewatch	·	4.4 km	MPC · JPL
476421	2008 DE_{34}	—	January 11, 2008	Kitt Peak	Spacewatch	·	2.6 km	MPC · JPL
476422	2008 DT_{34}	—	February 10, 2008	Kitt Peak	Spacewatch	·	3.2 km	MPC · JPL
476423	2008 DE_{55}	—	February 26, 2008	Kitt Peak	Spacewatch	H	440 m	MPC · JPL
476424	2008 DS_{59}	—	January 31, 2008	Kitt Peak	Spacewatch	·	1.9 km	MPC · JPL
476425	2008 DO_{62}	—	February 28, 2008	Mount Lemmon	Mount Lemmon Survey	·	3.2 km	MPC · JPL
476426	2008 DR_{65}	—	February 9, 2008	Mount Lemmon	Mount Lemmon Survey	·	2.8 km	MPC · JPL
476427	2008 DR_{67}	—	February 29, 2008	Kitt Peak	Spacewatch	·	730 m	MPC · JPL
476428	2008 DR_{71}	—	February 2, 2008	Kitt Peak	Spacewatch	HYG	2.6 km	MPC · JPL
476429	2008 DG_{77}	—	January 30, 2008	Kitt Peak	Spacewatch	·	750 m	MPC · JPL
476430	2008 DY_{78}	—	February 29, 2008	Mount Lemmon	Mount Lemmon Survey	PHO	960 m	MPC · JPL
476431	2008 DA_{82}	—	February 28, 2008	Kitt Peak	Spacewatch	·	2.7 km	MPC · JPL
476432	2008 DZ_{82}	—	February 28, 2008	Mount Lemmon	Mount Lemmon Survey	EOS	1.6 km	MPC · JPL
476433	2008 DV_{83}	—	February 28, 2008	Kitt Peak	Spacewatch	·	600 m	MPC · JPL
476434	2008 DQ_{87}	—	February 29, 2008	Mount Lemmon	Mount Lemmon Survey	·	2.8 km	MPC · JPL
476435	2008 DY_{88}	—	February 28, 2008	Mount Lemmon	Mount Lemmon Survey	·	670 m	MPC · JPL
476436	2008 DM_{89}	—	February 28, 2008	Mount Lemmon	Mount Lemmon Survey	·	3.7 km	MPC · JPL
476437	2008 EQ_{3}	—	February 14, 2008	Mount Lemmon	Mount Lemmon Survey	·	530 m	MPC · JPL
476438	2008 EB_{9}	—	March 8, 2008	Kitt Peak	Spacewatch	AMO	430 m	MPC · JPL
476439	2008 ET_{9}	—	January 30, 2008	Mount Lemmon	Mount Lemmon Survey	·	2.7 km	MPC · JPL
476440	2008 EA_{17}	—	October 19, 2006	Mount Lemmon	Mount Lemmon Survey	·	1.2 km	MPC · JPL
476441	2008 EL_{26}	—	February 12, 2008	Mount Lemmon	Mount Lemmon Survey	·	2.6 km	MPC · JPL
476442	2008 EL_{28}	—	March 4, 2008	Mount Lemmon	Mount Lemmon Survey	·	1.6 km	MPC · JPL
476443	2008 EP_{35}	—	March 2, 2008	Mount Lemmon	Mount Lemmon Survey	·	690 m	MPC · JPL
476444	2008 EA_{36}	—	January 13, 2002	Socorro	LINEAR	·	2.6 km	MPC · JPL
476445	2008 EW_{39}	—	February 29, 2008	Kitt Peak	Spacewatch	·	850 m	MPC · JPL
476446	2008 EN_{40}	—	March 4, 2008	Kitt Peak	Spacewatch	·	2.4 km	MPC · JPL
476447	2008 EW_{41}	—	March 4, 2008	Kitt Peak	Spacewatch	·	700 m	MPC · JPL
476448	2008 EQ_{45}	—	February 12, 2008	Mount Lemmon	Mount Lemmon Survey	·	810 m	MPC · JPL
476449	2008 EW_{45}	—	March 5, 2008	Kitt Peak	Spacewatch	·	1.1 km	MPC · JPL
476450	2008 EO_{50}	—	March 6, 2008	Mount Lemmon	Mount Lemmon Survey	·	1.4 km	MPC · JPL
476451	2008 EV_{50}	—	March 6, 2008	Mount Lemmon	Mount Lemmon Survey	·	3.5 km	MPC · JPL
476452	2008 EY_{50}	—	March 6, 2008	Kitt Peak	Spacewatch	ERI	1.1 km	MPC · JPL
476453	2008 EZ_{58}	—	February 8, 2008	Kitt Peak	Spacewatch	·	2.9 km	MPC · JPL
476454	2008 EC_{65}	—	March 9, 2008	Mount Lemmon	Mount Lemmon Survey	·	2.5 km	MPC · JPL
476455	2008 EV_{70}	—	January 15, 2008	Mount Lemmon	Mount Lemmon Survey	·	740 m	MPC · JPL
476456	2008 EY_{74}	—	February 28, 2008	Kitt Peak	Spacewatch	·	750 m	MPC · JPL
476457	2008 EY_{79}	—	January 20, 2008	Mount Lemmon	Mount Lemmon Survey	·	3.4 km	MPC · JPL
476458	2008 EP_{108}	—	February 13, 2008	Kitt Peak	Spacewatch	·	1.9 km	MPC · JPL
476459	2008 EZ_{116}	—	March 8, 2008	Kitt Peak	Spacewatch	·	4.0 km	MPC · JPL
476460	2008 EB_{126}	—	March 10, 2008	Kitt Peak	Spacewatch	·	630 m	MPC · JPL
476461	2008 EG_{127}	—	March 10, 2008	Kitt Peak	Spacewatch	·	740 m	MPC · JPL
476462	2008 EG_{130}	—	March 11, 2008	Kitt Peak	Spacewatch	·	3.2 km	MPC · JPL
476463	2008 EF_{141}	—	February 7, 2002	Kitt Peak	Spacewatch	·	3.4 km	MPC · JPL
476464	2008 EU_{149}	—	March 5, 2008	Kitt Peak	Spacewatch	·	2.9 km	MPC · JPL
476465	2008 ED_{153}	—	March 11, 2008	Mount Lemmon	Mount Lemmon Survey	EOS	1.5 km	MPC · JPL
476466	2008 EO_{154}	—	March 5, 2008	Kitt Peak	Spacewatch	CYB	3.3 km	MPC · JPL
476467	2008 EY_{156}	—	March 12, 2008	Mount Lemmon	Mount Lemmon Survey	·	3.2 km	MPC · JPL
476468	2008 ER_{158}	—	March 10, 2008	Kitt Peak	Spacewatch	·	560 m	MPC · JPL
476469	2008 EU_{164}	—	March 1, 2008	Kitt Peak	Spacewatch	·	3.5 km	MPC · JPL
476470	2008 EY_{164}	—	March 1, 2008	Kitt Peak	Spacewatch	·	2.5 km	MPC · JPL
476471	2008 FL_{2}	—	March 25, 2008	Kitt Peak	Spacewatch	·	740 m	MPC · JPL
476472	2008 FP_{2}	—	January 11, 2008	Mount Lemmon	Mount Lemmon Survey	·	2.8 km	MPC · JPL
476473	2008 FG_{9}	—	August 29, 2005	Kitt Peak	Spacewatch	EOS	2.1 km	MPC · JPL
476474	2008 FY_{18}	—	March 27, 2008	Mount Lemmon	Mount Lemmon Survey	EOS	1.7 km	MPC · JPL
476475	2008 FN_{20}	—	March 10, 2008	Mount Lemmon	Mount Lemmon Survey	·	2.6 km	MPC · JPL
476476	2008 FG_{22}	—	March 27, 2008	Kitt Peak	Spacewatch	V	760 m	MPC · JPL
476477	2008 FY_{30}	—	February 3, 2008	Kitt Peak	Spacewatch	·	3.8 km	MPC · JPL
476478	2008 FN_{36}	—	February 7, 2008	Mount Lemmon	Mount Lemmon Survey	·	2.3 km	MPC · JPL
476479	2008 FM_{42}	—	February 7, 2008	Mount Lemmon	Mount Lemmon Survey	·	3.1 km	MPC · JPL
476480	2008 FD_{44}	—	March 2, 2008	Kitt Peak	Spacewatch	·	3.0 km	MPC · JPL
476481	2008 FZ_{44}	—	March 28, 2008	Mount Lemmon	Mount Lemmon Survey	·	610 m	MPC · JPL
476482	2008 FF_{49}	—	March 2, 2008	Kitt Peak	Spacewatch	·	1.5 km	MPC · JPL
476483	2008 FN_{52}	—	March 28, 2008	Mount Lemmon	Mount Lemmon Survey	PHO	850 m	MPC · JPL
476484	2008 FA_{56}	—	March 12, 2008	Mount Lemmon	Mount Lemmon Survey	·	650 m	MPC · JPL
476485	2008 FT_{63}	—	December 16, 2007	Kitt Peak	Spacewatch	·	3.4 km	MPC · JPL
476486	2008 FV_{63}	—	March 27, 2008	Kitt Peak	Spacewatch	·	980 m	MPC · JPL
476487	2008 FR_{64}	—	March 5, 2008	Mount Lemmon	Mount Lemmon Survey	MAS	660 m	MPC · JPL
476488	2008 FK_{90}	—	February 12, 2008	Kitt Peak	Spacewatch	LIX	3.8 km	MPC · JPL
476489	2008 FL_{98}	—	March 30, 2008	Kitt Peak	Spacewatch	·	640 m	MPC · JPL
476490	2008 FZ_{104}	—	March 30, 2008	Kitt Peak	Spacewatch	·	1.0 km	MPC · JPL
476491	2008 FY_{106}	—	March 31, 2008	Kitt Peak	Spacewatch	NYS	790 m	MPC · JPL
476492	2008 FG_{108}	—	March 11, 2008	Kitt Peak	Spacewatch	·	2.4 km	MPC · JPL
476493	2008 FR_{112}	—	March 31, 2008	Kitt Peak	Spacewatch	·	1.0 km	MPC · JPL
476494	2008 FS_{116}	—	March 31, 2008	Kitt Peak	Spacewatch	·	530 m	MPC · JPL
476495	2008 FQ_{120}	—	March 31, 2008	Mount Lemmon	Mount Lemmon Survey	EMA	3.2 km	MPC · JPL
476496	2008 FD_{123}	—	March 28, 2008	Kitt Peak	Spacewatch	·	3.3 km	MPC · JPL
476497	2008 FG_{126}	—	March 27, 2008	Kitt Peak	Spacewatch	·	910 m	MPC · JPL
476498	2008 FA_{133}	—	March 30, 2008	Kitt Peak	Spacewatch	·	2.3 km	MPC · JPL
476499	2008 FG_{136}	—	March 26, 2008	Kitt Peak	Spacewatch	·	1.0 km	MPC · JPL
476500	2008 GA_{6}	—	April 1, 2008	Kitt Peak	Spacewatch	·	3.9 km	MPC · JPL

== 476501–476600 ==
back to top

Designation			Discovery			Properties		Ref
Permanent	Provisional	Named after	Date	Site	Discoverer(s)	Category	Diam.	Ref
476501	2008 GS_{8}	—	April 1, 2008	Kitt Peak	Spacewatch	·	3.4 km	MPC · JPL
476502	2008 GP_{10}	—	April 1, 2008	Kitt Peak	Spacewatch	VER	2.4 km	MPC · JPL
476503	2008 GE_{17}	—	April 3, 2008	Kitt Peak	Spacewatch	·	650 m	MPC · JPL
476504	2008 GD_{20}	—	March 31, 2008	Mount Lemmon	Mount Lemmon Survey	H	370 m	MPC · JPL
476505	2008 GA_{22}	—	April 13, 2008	Sierra Nevada	Sierra Nevada	·	4.7 km	MPC · JPL
476506	2008 GE_{32}	—	April 3, 2008	Kitt Peak	Spacewatch	·	660 m	MPC · JPL
476507	2008 GT_{34}	—	April 3, 2008	Mount Lemmon	Mount Lemmon Survey	·	3.3 km	MPC · JPL
476508	2008 GG_{43}	—	April 4, 2008	Mount Lemmon	Mount Lemmon Survey	·	470 m	MPC · JPL
476509	2008 GX_{48}	—	February 26, 2008	Mount Lemmon	Mount Lemmon Survey	·	660 m	MPC · JPL
476510	2008 GY_{50}	—	October 1, 2005	Kitt Peak	Spacewatch	EOS	1.8 km	MPC · JPL
476511	2008 GP_{52}	—	April 5, 2008	Mount Lemmon	Mount Lemmon Survey	·	660 m	MPC · JPL
476512	2008 GA_{58}	—	March 28, 2008	Mount Lemmon	Mount Lemmon Survey	·	2.7 km	MPC · JPL
476513	2008 GW_{61}	—	April 5, 2008	Mount Lemmon	Mount Lemmon Survey	·	3.0 km	MPC · JPL
476514	2008 GD_{69}	—	April 6, 2008	Kitt Peak	Spacewatch	NYS	890 m	MPC · JPL
476515	2008 GM_{70}	—	April 6, 2008	Mount Lemmon	Mount Lemmon Survey	PHO	1.2 km	MPC · JPL
476516	2008 GW_{72}	—	March 2, 2008	Kitt Peak	Spacewatch	·	2.8 km	MPC · JPL
476517	2008 GR_{73}	—	March 31, 2008	Mount Lemmon	Mount Lemmon Survey	·	3.0 km	MPC · JPL
476518	2008 GN_{75}	—	April 3, 2008	Kitt Peak	Spacewatch	VER	3.1 km	MPC · JPL
476519	2008 GM_{77}	—	April 7, 2008	Kitt Peak	Spacewatch	·	820 m	MPC · JPL
476520	2008 GU_{82}	—	March 5, 2008	Kitt Peak	Spacewatch	·	2.6 km	MPC · JPL
476521	2008 GH_{84}	—	April 8, 2008	Mount Lemmon	Mount Lemmon Survey	·	810 m	MPC · JPL
476522	2008 GH_{88}	—	March 29, 2008	Mount Lemmon	Mount Lemmon Survey	MAS	530 m	MPC · JPL
476523	2008 GO_{90}	—	April 6, 2008	Mount Lemmon	Mount Lemmon Survey	·	890 m	MPC · JPL
476524	2008 GU_{93}	—	April 7, 2008	Kitt Peak	Spacewatch	·	990 m	MPC · JPL
476525	2008 GQ_{95}	—	March 7, 2008	Mount Lemmon	Mount Lemmon Survey	·	3.5 km	MPC · JPL
476526	2008 GP_{99}	—	April 9, 2008	Kitt Peak	Spacewatch	·	910 m	MPC · JPL
476527	2008 GY_{104}	—	April 11, 2008	Kitt Peak	Spacewatch	CYB	4.4 km	MPC · JPL
476528	2008 GX_{111}	—	March 15, 2008	Dauban	C. Rinner, F. Kugel	PHO	1.2 km	MPC · JPL
476529	2008 GJ_{117}	—	April 11, 2008	Kitt Peak	Spacewatch	·	4.0 km	MPC · JPL
476530	2008 GD_{126}	—	April 4, 2008	Catalina	CSS	·	1.1 km	MPC · JPL
476531	2008 GX_{129}	—	April 4, 2008	Mount Lemmon	Mount Lemmon Survey	·	3.6 km	MPC · JPL
476532	2008 GT_{131}	—	April 6, 2008	Kitt Peak	Spacewatch	·	830 m	MPC · JPL
476533	2008 GZ_{138}	—	April 1, 2008	Kitt Peak	Spacewatch	·	870 m	MPC · JPL
476534	2008 GQ_{141}	—	April 1, 2008	Kitt Peak	Spacewatch	L5	7.3 km	MPC · JPL
476535	2008 GP_{143}	—	April 14, 2008	Catalina	CSS	·	1.2 km	MPC · JPL
476536	2008 HE_{5}	—	March 13, 2008	Kitt Peak	Spacewatch	·	2.9 km	MPC · JPL
476537	2008 HE_{6}	—	March 10, 2008	Kitt Peak	Spacewatch	·	590 m	MPC · JPL
476538	2008 HN_{9}	—	April 24, 2008	Mount Lemmon	Mount Lemmon Survey	·	3.3 km	MPC · JPL
476539	2008 HL_{14}	—	April 25, 2008	Kitt Peak	Spacewatch	T_{j} (2.96)	3.2 km	MPC · JPL
476540	2008 HC_{24}	—	April 3, 2008	Mount Lemmon	Mount Lemmon Survey	·	2.6 km	MPC · JPL
476541	2008 HM_{36}	—	April 4, 2008	Kitt Peak	Spacewatch	·	790 m	MPC · JPL
476542	2008 HV_{36}	—	April 4, 2008	Kitt Peak	Spacewatch	·	3.3 km	MPC · JPL
476543	2008 HQ_{43}	—	April 27, 2008	Mount Lemmon	Mount Lemmon Survey	EOS	1.7 km	MPC · JPL
476544	2008 HB_{44}	—	April 27, 2008	Mount Lemmon	Mount Lemmon Survey	·	4.0 km	MPC · JPL
476545	2008 HD_{46}	—	April 28, 2008	Kitt Peak	Spacewatch	NYS	800 m	MPC · JPL
476546	2008 HO_{50}	—	April 29, 2008	Kitt Peak	Spacewatch	·	890 m	MPC · JPL
476547	2008 HH_{51}	—	April 14, 2008	Kitt Peak	Spacewatch	·	950 m	MPC · JPL
476548	2008 HO_{56}	—	April 30, 2008	Kitt Peak	Spacewatch	·	680 m	MPC · JPL
476549	2008 JB_{10}	—	April 29, 2008	Kitt Peak	Spacewatch	·	990 m	MPC · JPL
476550	2008 JQ_{10}	—	March 30, 2008	Kitt Peak	Spacewatch	·	2.6 km	MPC · JPL
476551	2008 JO_{13}	—	May 5, 2008	Mount Lemmon	Mount Lemmon Survey	·	1.2 km	MPC · JPL
476552	2008 JQ_{16}	—	April 3, 2008	Mount Lemmon	Mount Lemmon Survey	·	780 m	MPC · JPL
476553	2008 JR_{16}	—	May 3, 2008	Mount Lemmon	Mount Lemmon Survey	·	2.9 km	MPC · JPL
476554	2008 JN_{18}	—	March 31, 2008	Kitt Peak	Spacewatch	·	750 m	MPC · JPL
476555	2008 JJ_{27}	—	May 8, 2008	Kitt Peak	Spacewatch	·	3.7 km	MPC · JPL
476556	2008 JM_{33}	—	May 11, 2008	Kitt Peak	Spacewatch	·	3.3 km	MPC · JPL
476557	2008 KA_{1}	—	May 26, 2008	Kitt Peak	Spacewatch	·	1.1 km	MPC · JPL
476558	2008 KP_{21}	—	May 28, 2008	Kitt Peak	Spacewatch	·	960 m	MPC · JPL
476559	2008 OC_{10}	—	July 28, 2008	Dauban	Kugel, F.	·	1.3 km	MPC · JPL
476560	2008 OP_{12}	—	July 28, 2008	La Sagra	OAM	3:2 · SHU	6.1 km	MPC · JPL
476561	2008 OU_{20}	—	July 29, 2008	Kitt Peak	Spacewatch	·	1.1 km	MPC · JPL
476562	2008 OB_{21}	—	July 29, 2008	Kitt Peak	Spacewatch	·	1.1 km	MPC · JPL
476563	2008 PD_{19}	—	August 7, 2008	Kitt Peak	Spacewatch	·	620 m	MPC · JPL
476564	2008 QL_{21}	—	August 26, 2008	Socorro	LINEAR	·	1.5 km	MPC · JPL
476565	2008 QA_{37}	—	August 21, 2008	Kitt Peak	Spacewatch	·	630 m	MPC · JPL
476566	2008 RC_{4}	—	September 2, 2008	Kitt Peak	Spacewatch	·	650 m	MPC · JPL
476567	2008 RY_{9}	—	September 3, 2008	Kitt Peak	Spacewatch	·	870 m	MPC · JPL
476568	2008 RE_{12}	—	September 3, 2008	Kitt Peak	Spacewatch	·	1.2 km	MPC · JPL
476569	2008 RJ_{16}	—	August 24, 2008	Kitt Peak	Spacewatch	·	940 m	MPC · JPL
476570	2008 RH_{23}	—	September 4, 2008	Socorro	LINEAR	·	1.4 km	MPC · JPL
476571	2008 RZ_{28}	—	September 2, 2008	Kitt Peak	Spacewatch	·	750 m	MPC · JPL
476572	2008 RX_{30}	—	September 2, 2008	Kitt Peak	Spacewatch	·	1.5 km	MPC · JPL
476573	2008 RA_{35}	—	August 24, 2008	Kitt Peak	Spacewatch	H	440 m	MPC · JPL
476574	2008 RG_{40}	—	September 2, 2008	Kitt Peak	Spacewatch	·	1.1 km	MPC · JPL
476575	2008 RQ_{41}	—	September 2, 2008	Kitt Peak	Spacewatch	·	1.4 km	MPC · JPL
476576	2008 RZ_{43}	—	September 2, 2008	Kitt Peak	Spacewatch	·	920 m	MPC · JPL
476577	2008 RQ_{44}	—	September 2, 2008	Kitt Peak	Spacewatch	·	1.2 km	MPC · JPL
476578	2008 RX_{57}	—	September 3, 2008	Kitt Peak	Spacewatch	·	910 m	MPC · JPL
476579	2008 RC_{63}	—	September 7, 2004	Kitt Peak	Spacewatch	·	1.0 km	MPC · JPL
476580	2008 RZ_{88}	—	September 5, 2008	Kitt Peak	Spacewatch	·	1.0 km	MPC · JPL
476581	2008 RY_{117}	—	September 9, 2008	Mount Lemmon	Mount Lemmon Survey	·	1.3 km	MPC · JPL
476582	2008 RW_{123}	—	September 6, 2008	Mount Lemmon	Mount Lemmon Survey	·	730 m	MPC · JPL
476583	2008 RA_{131}	—	September 6, 2008	Mount Lemmon	Mount Lemmon Survey	·	1.2 km	MPC · JPL
476584	2008 RP_{131}	—	September 5, 2008	Kitt Peak	Spacewatch	EUN	930 m	MPC · JPL
476585	2008 RM_{135}	—	September 3, 2008	Kitt Peak	Spacewatch	T_{j} (2.96) · 3:2	4.6 km	MPC · JPL
476586	2008 RV_{135}	—	September 3, 2008	Kitt Peak	Spacewatch	·	1.2 km	MPC · JPL
476587	2008 RP_{137}	—	September 5, 2008	Kitt Peak	Spacewatch	·	1.6 km	MPC · JPL
476588	2008 RB_{139}	—	September 6, 2008	Mount Lemmon	Mount Lemmon Survey	(5)	860 m	MPC · JPL
476589	2008 SU_{11}	—	September 25, 2008	Bergisch Gladbach	W. Bickel	H	510 m	MPC · JPL
476590	2008 SR_{13}	—	September 19, 2008	Kitt Peak	Spacewatch	·	1.0 km	MPC · JPL
476591	2008 SL_{19}	—	August 7, 2008	Kitt Peak	Spacewatch	·	1.0 km	MPC · JPL
476592	2008 SS_{21}	—	July 29, 2008	Kitt Peak	Spacewatch	·	1.0 km	MPC · JPL
476593	2008 SD_{38}	—	September 6, 2008	Mount Lemmon	Mount Lemmon Survey	·	1.1 km	MPC · JPL
476594	2008 SH_{40}	—	September 20, 2008	Kitt Peak	Spacewatch	·	1.0 km	MPC · JPL
476595	2008 SE_{44}	—	September 20, 2008	Kitt Peak	Spacewatch	·	1.0 km	MPC · JPL
476596	2008 SU_{49}	—	September 20, 2008	Mount Lemmon	Mount Lemmon Survey	·	560 m	MPC · JPL
476597	2008 ST_{54}	—	September 20, 2008	Mount Lemmon	Mount Lemmon Survey	·	890 m	MPC · JPL
476598	2008 SB_{72}	—	September 9, 2008	Mount Lemmon	Mount Lemmon Survey	·	930 m	MPC · JPL
476599	2008 SA_{74}	—	September 23, 2008	Kitt Peak	Spacewatch	·	610 m	MPC · JPL
476600	2008 SQ_{83}	—	September 27, 2008	Altschwendt	W. Ries	3:2	4.3 km	MPC · JPL

== 476601–476700 ==
back to top

Designation			Discovery			Properties		Ref
Permanent	Provisional	Named after	Date	Site	Discoverer(s)	Category	Diam.	Ref
476601	2008 SE_{85}	—	September 28, 2008	Catalina	CSS	APO · PHA	390 m	MPC · JPL
476602	2008 SZ_{96}	—	September 21, 2008	Kitt Peak	Spacewatch	·	1.2 km	MPC · JPL
476603	2008 ST_{99}	—	September 21, 2008	Kitt Peak	Spacewatch	·	1.5 km	MPC · JPL
476604	2008 SQ_{105}	—	September 21, 2008	Kitt Peak	Spacewatch	·	1.2 km	MPC · JPL
476605	2008 SM_{110}	—	September 22, 2008	Kitt Peak	Spacewatch	T_{j} (2.99) · 3:2	4.0 km	MPC · JPL
476606	2008 SM_{120}	—	September 22, 2008	Mount Lemmon	Mount Lemmon Survey	·	1.4 km	MPC · JPL
476607	2008 SL_{124}	—	September 22, 2008	Mount Lemmon	Mount Lemmon Survey	MAR	760 m	MPC · JPL
476608	2008 SF_{125}	—	September 22, 2008	Mount Lemmon	Mount Lemmon Survey	(5)	1.1 km	MPC · JPL
476609	2008 SR_{130}	—	September 22, 2008	Kitt Peak	Spacewatch	(5)	950 m	MPC · JPL
476610	2008 SE_{132}	—	September 6, 2008	Mount Lemmon	Mount Lemmon Survey	·	1.1 km	MPC · JPL
476611	2008 SV_{135}	—	September 6, 2008	Mount Lemmon	Mount Lemmon Survey	·	1.7 km	MPC · JPL
476612	2008 SK_{137}	—	September 23, 2008	Kitt Peak	Spacewatch	·	680 m	MPC · JPL
476613	2008 SV_{137}	—	September 23, 2008	Kitt Peak	Spacewatch	·	590 m	MPC · JPL
476614	2008 SK_{138}	—	September 23, 2008	Kitt Peak	Spacewatch	(5)	1.1 km	MPC · JPL
476615	2008 SJ_{142}	—	September 24, 2008	Mount Lemmon	Mount Lemmon Survey	·	1.4 km	MPC · JPL
476616	2008 ST_{142}	—	September 24, 2008	Mount Lemmon	Mount Lemmon Survey	·	830 m	MPC · JPL
476617	2008 SX_{143}	—	September 9, 2008	Mount Lemmon	Mount Lemmon Survey	·	1.5 km	MPC · JPL
476618	2008 SG_{151}	—	August 24, 2008	Kitt Peak	Spacewatch	·	1.1 km	MPC · JPL
476619	2008 SA_{155}	—	September 22, 2008	Mount Lemmon	Mount Lemmon Survey	·	1.1 km	MPC · JPL
476620	2008 SD_{157}	—	September 24, 2008	Socorro	LINEAR	NYS	1.0 km	MPC · JPL
476621	2008 SP_{162}	—	September 10, 2008	Kitt Peak	Spacewatch	(5)	990 m	MPC · JPL
476622	2008 SC_{163}	—	September 3, 2008	Kitt Peak	Spacewatch	NYS	1.2 km	MPC · JPL
476623	2008 SQ_{167}	—	September 28, 2008	Socorro	LINEAR	·	890 m	MPC · JPL
476624	2008 SE_{182}	—	September 24, 2008	Mount Lemmon	Mount Lemmon Survey	·	1.7 km	MPC · JPL
476625	2008 SA_{188}	—	September 25, 2008	Kitt Peak	Spacewatch	3:2	4.5 km	MPC · JPL
476626	2008 SP_{189}	—	September 25, 2008	Kitt Peak	Spacewatch	·	1.5 km	MPC · JPL
476627	2008 SB_{190}	—	September 25, 2008	Kitt Peak	Spacewatch	·	1.3 km	MPC · JPL
476628	2008 SV_{194}	—	September 25, 2008	Kitt Peak	Spacewatch	KON	1.8 km	MPC · JPL
476629	2008 SG_{198}	—	September 25, 2008	Kitt Peak	Spacewatch	·	1 km	MPC · JPL
476630	2008 SA_{200}	—	September 26, 2008	Kitt Peak	Spacewatch	·	1.1 km	MPC · JPL
476631	2008 SW_{200}	—	September 22, 2008	Kitt Peak	Spacewatch	·	770 m	MPC · JPL
476632	2008 SQ_{213}	—	August 24, 2008	Kitt Peak	Spacewatch	3:2	4.1 km	MPC · JPL
476633	2008 SQ_{217}	—	September 29, 2008	Kitt Peak	Spacewatch	·	1.0 km	MPC · JPL
476634	2008 SR_{217}	—	September 29, 2008	Kitt Peak	Spacewatch	H	460 m	MPC · JPL
476635	2008 SD_{233}	—	September 4, 2008	Kitt Peak	Spacewatch	·	1.0 km	MPC · JPL
476636	2008 SA_{244}	—	September 24, 2008	Kitt Peak	Spacewatch	·	1.1 km	MPC · JPL
476637	2008 SX_{250}	—	September 24, 2008	Kitt Peak	Spacewatch	·	770 m	MPC · JPL
476638	2008 SO_{252}	—	September 27, 2008	Mount Lemmon	Mount Lemmon Survey	H	550 m	MPC · JPL
476639	2008 SD_{253}	—	September 21, 2008	Kitt Peak	Spacewatch	(5)	780 m	MPC · JPL
476640	2008 SX_{253}	—	September 22, 2008	Kitt Peak	Spacewatch	·	1.1 km	MPC · JPL
476641	2008 SL_{254}	—	September 22, 2008	Mount Lemmon	Mount Lemmon Survey	·	1.7 km	MPC · JPL
476642	2008 SW_{257}	—	September 22, 2008	Mount Lemmon	Mount Lemmon Survey	T_{j} (2.98) · 3:2	4.3 km	MPC · JPL
476643	2008 SS_{260}	—	September 23, 2008	Catalina	CSS	·	1.3 km	MPC · JPL
476644	2008 SN_{264}	—	September 25, 2008	Kitt Peak	Spacewatch	·	610 m	MPC · JPL
476645	2008 SD_{266}	—	September 29, 2008	Kitt Peak	Spacewatch	(5)	940 m	MPC · JPL
476646	2008 SS_{269}	—	September 22, 2008	Kitt Peak	Spacewatch	·	670 m	MPC · JPL
476647	2008 SH_{270}	—	September 24, 2008	Kitt Peak	Spacewatch	·	950 m	MPC · JPL
476648	2008 SK_{271}	—	September 29, 2008	Catalina	CSS	·	1.1 km	MPC · JPL
476649	2008 SG_{273}	—	September 23, 2008	Mount Lemmon	Mount Lemmon Survey	·	830 m	MPC · JPL
476650	2008 SP_{273}	—	September 29, 2008	Mount Lemmon	Mount Lemmon Survey	·	890 m	MPC · JPL
476651	2008 SZ_{282}	—	September 29, 2008	Mount Lemmon	Mount Lemmon Survey	·	1.1 km	MPC · JPL
476652	2008 SF_{283}	—	September 22, 2008	Mount Lemmon	Mount Lemmon Survey	RAF	580 m	MPC · JPL
476653	2008 SF_{284}	—	September 23, 2008	Mount Lemmon	Mount Lemmon Survey	·	820 m	MPC · JPL
476654	2008 SJ_{284}	—	September 24, 2008	Kitt Peak	Spacewatch	·	1.2 km	MPC · JPL
476655	2008 SD_{288}	—	September 23, 2008	Kitt Peak	Spacewatch	·	770 m	MPC · JPL
476656	2008 SE_{290}	—	September 29, 2008	Kitt Peak	Spacewatch	·	1.1 km	MPC · JPL
476657	2008 SC_{300}	—	September 22, 2008	Kitt Peak	Spacewatch	(5)	980 m	MPC · JPL
476658	2008 SP_{303}	—	September 24, 2008	Catalina	CSS	·	1.4 km	MPC · JPL
476659	2008 SO_{306}	—	September 28, 2008	Mount Lemmon	Mount Lemmon Survey	H	510 m	MPC · JPL
476660	2008 SW_{309}	—	September 29, 2008	Mount Lemmon	Mount Lemmon Survey	·	1.2 km	MPC · JPL
476661	2008 TB_{8}	—	October 4, 2008	La Sagra	OAM	·	710 m	MPC · JPL
476662	2008 TH_{8}	—	October 4, 2008	La Sagra	OAM	·	1.0 km	MPC · JPL
476663	2008 TG_{10}	—	September 7, 2008	Mount Lemmon	Mount Lemmon Survey	·	1.2 km	MPC · JPL
476664	2008 TC_{17}	—	October 1, 2008	Mount Lemmon	Mount Lemmon Survey	(5)	790 m	MPC · JPL
476665	2008 TH_{17}	—	September 22, 2008	Mount Lemmon	Mount Lemmon Survey	(5)	800 m	MPC · JPL
476666	2008 TC_{18}	—	October 1, 2008	Mount Lemmon	Mount Lemmon Survey	·	930 m	MPC · JPL
476667	2008 TB_{31}	—	September 24, 2008	Kitt Peak	Spacewatch	·	680 m	MPC · JPL
476668	2008 TC_{33}	—	October 1, 2008	Kitt Peak	Spacewatch	(5)	840 m	MPC · JPL
476669	2008 TN_{33}	—	February 3, 2006	Kitt Peak	Spacewatch	·	1.3 km	MPC · JPL
476670	2008 TW_{35}	—	October 1, 2008	Mount Lemmon	Mount Lemmon Survey	·	990 m	MPC · JPL
476671	2008 TR_{39}	—	September 21, 2008	Kitt Peak	Spacewatch	·	1.2 km	MPC · JPL
476672	2008 TX_{39}	—	October 1, 2008	Kitt Peak	Spacewatch	·	1.6 km	MPC · JPL
476673	2008 TN_{44}	—	October 1, 2008	Mount Lemmon	Mount Lemmon Survey	·	1 km	MPC · JPL
476674	2008 TX_{47}	—	October 1, 2008	Kitt Peak	Spacewatch	·	1.1 km	MPC · JPL
476675	2008 TD_{51}	—	October 2, 2008	Kitt Peak	Spacewatch	·	890 m	MPC · JPL
476676	2008 TU_{54}	—	October 2, 2008	Kitt Peak	Spacewatch	3:2 · SHU	4.6 km	MPC · JPL
476677	2008 TV_{55}	—	October 2, 2008	Kitt Peak	Spacewatch	3:2 · SHU	3.5 km	MPC · JPL
476678	2008 TP_{58}	—	September 24, 2008	Kitt Peak	Spacewatch	·	1.1 km	MPC · JPL
476679	2008 TV_{63}	—	September 22, 2008	Mount Lemmon	Mount Lemmon Survey	3:2	4.4 km	MPC · JPL
476680	2008 TN_{64}	—	October 2, 2008	Kitt Peak	Spacewatch	(5)	1.1 km	MPC · JPL
476681	2008 TB_{67}	—	October 2, 2008	Kitt Peak	Spacewatch	·	1.0 km	MPC · JPL
476682	2008 TY_{73}	—	October 2, 2008	Kitt Peak	Spacewatch	·	1.0 km	MPC · JPL
476683	2008 TR_{74}	—	October 2, 2008	Kitt Peak	Spacewatch	·	790 m	MPC · JPL
476684	2008 TE_{79}	—	September 24, 2008	Kitt Peak	Spacewatch	·	850 m	MPC · JPL
476685	2008 TN_{80}	—	September 24, 2008	Kitt Peak	Spacewatch	KON	2.3 km	MPC · JPL
476686	2008 TW_{85}	—	October 3, 2008	Mount Lemmon	Mount Lemmon Survey	·	1.2 km	MPC · JPL
476687	2008 TP_{88}	—	October 3, 2008	Mount Lemmon	Mount Lemmon Survey	(5)	890 m	MPC · JPL
476688	2008 TN_{95}	—	October 6, 2008	Kitt Peak	Spacewatch	·	1.1 km	MPC · JPL
476689	2008 TL_{99}	—	October 6, 2008	Kitt Peak	Spacewatch	(5)	670 m	MPC · JPL
476690	2008 TY_{101}	—	October 6, 2008	Kitt Peak	Spacewatch	·	1.0 km	MPC · JPL
476691	2008 TS_{102}	—	October 6, 2008	Kitt Peak	Spacewatch	·	860 m	MPC · JPL
476692	2008 TO_{103}	—	October 6, 2008	Kitt Peak	Spacewatch	·	1.6 km	MPC · JPL
476693	2008 TX_{103}	—	October 6, 2008	Kitt Peak	Spacewatch	·	1.3 km	MPC · JPL
476694	2008 TH_{104}	—	October 6, 2008	Kitt Peak	Spacewatch	·	680 m	MPC · JPL
476695	2008 TF_{107}	—	October 6, 2008	Mount Lemmon	Mount Lemmon Survey	·	1.2 km	MPC · JPL
476696	2008 TN_{119}	—	September 5, 2008	Kitt Peak	Spacewatch	RAF	840 m	MPC · JPL
476697	2008 TC_{121}	—	October 7, 2008	Kitt Peak	Spacewatch	·	910 m	MPC · JPL
476698	2008 TG_{126}	—	October 8, 2008	Mount Lemmon	Mount Lemmon Survey	·	1.3 km	MPC · JPL
476699	2008 TY_{130}	—	October 8, 2008	Mount Lemmon	Mount Lemmon Survey	·	810 m	MPC · JPL
476700	2008 TU_{131}	—	October 8, 2008	Mount Lemmon	Mount Lemmon Survey	·	1.1 km	MPC · JPL

== 476701–476800 ==
back to top

Designation			Discovery			Properties		Ref
Permanent	Provisional	Named after	Date	Site	Discoverer(s)	Category	Diam.	Ref
476701	2008 TX_{131}	—	September 23, 2008	Kitt Peak	Spacewatch	·	1.4 km	MPC · JPL
476702	2008 TX_{136}	—	October 8, 2008	Kitt Peak	Spacewatch	3:2 · SHU	4.5 km	MPC · JPL
476703	2008 TQ_{145}	—	October 9, 2008	Mount Lemmon	Mount Lemmon Survey	3:2 · SHU	3.9 km	MPC · JPL
476704	2008 TH_{152}	—	September 2, 2008	Kitt Peak	Spacewatch	·	1.3 km	MPC · JPL
476705	2008 TO_{152}	—	October 9, 2008	Mount Lemmon	Mount Lemmon Survey	·	660 m	MPC · JPL
476706	2008 TT_{154}	—	September 24, 2008	Mount Lemmon	Mount Lemmon Survey	·	1.1 km	MPC · JPL
476707	2008 TO_{161}	—	February 2, 2006	Mount Lemmon	Mount Lemmon Survey	·	970 m	MPC · JPL
476708	2008 TE_{165}	—	October 2, 2008	Kitt Peak	Spacewatch	(5)	820 m	MPC · JPL
476709	2008 TG_{172}	—	October 1, 2008	Kitt Peak	Spacewatch	H	430 m	MPC · JPL
476710	2008 TM_{172}	—	October 6, 2008	Mount Lemmon	Mount Lemmon Survey	·	1.2 km	MPC · JPL
476711	2008 TN_{172}	—	October 7, 2008	Mount Lemmon	Mount Lemmon Survey	·	960 m	MPC · JPL
476712	2008 TS_{172}	—	October 3, 2008	Mount Lemmon	Mount Lemmon Survey	·	1.5 km	MPC · JPL
476713	2008 TX_{177}	—	October 9, 2008	Catalina	CSS	MAR	1.1 km	MPC · JPL
476714	2008 TX_{181}	—	February 10, 2002	Socorro	LINEAR	·	1.4 km	MPC · JPL
476715	2008 TB_{183}	—	October 2, 2008	Socorro	LINEAR	·	1.7 km	MPC · JPL
476716	2008 TG_{185}	—	October 6, 2008	Catalina	CSS	·	1.3 km	MPC · JPL
476717	2008 TZ_{185}	—	October 10, 2008	Catalina	CSS	·	1.3 km	MPC · JPL
476718	2008 TM_{186}	—	October 7, 2008	Catalina	CSS	·	910 m	MPC · JPL
476719	2008 TP_{186}	—	October 8, 2008	Kitt Peak	Spacewatch	·	1.0 km	MPC · JPL
476720	2008 UU_{3}	—	October 22, 2008	Bergisch Gladbach	W. Bickel	·	1.1 km	MPC · JPL
476721	2008 UV_{4}	—	September 24, 2008	Mount Lemmon	Mount Lemmon Survey	·	1.0 km	MPC · JPL
476722	2008 UT_{6}	—	October 23, 2008	Kitt Peak	Spacewatch	·	630 m	MPC · JPL
476723	2008 UG_{12}	—	September 23, 2008	Kitt Peak	Spacewatch	·	1 km	MPC · JPL
476724	2008 UH_{16}	—	October 18, 2008	Kitt Peak	Spacewatch	·	890 m	MPC · JPL
476725	2008 UW_{19}	—	October 19, 2008	Kitt Peak	Spacewatch	T_{j} (2.98) · 3:2	4.0 km	MPC · JPL
476726	2008 UW_{21}	—	September 22, 2008	Kitt Peak	Spacewatch	MAR	950 m	MPC · JPL
476727	2008 UX_{21}	—	October 19, 2008	Kitt Peak	Spacewatch	·	720 m	MPC · JPL
476728	2008 UZ_{24}	—	September 6, 2008	Kitt Peak	Spacewatch	·	970 m	MPC · JPL
476729	2008 UR_{29}	—	September 22, 2008	Mount Lemmon	Mount Lemmon Survey	·	1.1 km	MPC · JPL
476730	2008 UR_{32}	—	October 20, 2008	Kitt Peak	Spacewatch	·	840 m	MPC · JPL
476731	2008 UE_{33}	—	October 20, 2008	Kitt Peak	Spacewatch	T_{j} (2.97)	3.2 km	MPC · JPL
476732	2008 UR_{34}	—	September 23, 2008	Mount Lemmon	Mount Lemmon Survey	·	940 m	MPC · JPL
476733	2008 UF_{35}	—	October 20, 2008	Mount Lemmon	Mount Lemmon Survey	(5)	860 m	MPC · JPL
476734	2008 UH_{35}	—	October 1, 2008	Kitt Peak	Spacewatch	·	930 m	MPC · JPL
476735	2008 UL_{35}	—	September 24, 2008	Kitt Peak	Spacewatch	·	1.0 km	MPC · JPL
476736	2008 UR_{36}	—	December 10, 2004	Kitt Peak	Spacewatch	(5)	990 m	MPC · JPL
476737	2008 UM_{45}	—	October 20, 2008	Mount Lemmon	Mount Lemmon Survey	·	1.3 km	MPC · JPL
476738	2008 UN_{46}	—	October 20, 2008	Kitt Peak	Spacewatch	·	940 m	MPC · JPL
476739	2008 UP_{47}	—	September 22, 2008	Mount Lemmon	Mount Lemmon Survey	·	1.6 km	MPC · JPL
476740	2008 UO_{51}	—	September 24, 2008	Mount Lemmon	Mount Lemmon Survey	·	1.3 km	MPC · JPL
476741	2008 UU_{52}	—	September 24, 2008	Mount Lemmon	Mount Lemmon Survey	·	1.4 km	MPC · JPL
476742	2008 UB_{53}	—	October 20, 2008	Mount Lemmon	Mount Lemmon Survey	·	1.2 km	MPC · JPL
476743	2008 UX_{53}	—	October 20, 2008	Kitt Peak	Spacewatch	·	710 m	MPC · JPL
476744	2008 UN_{54}	—	September 24, 2008	Mount Lemmon	Mount Lemmon Survey	·	1.5 km	MPC · JPL
476745	2008 UG_{57}	—	October 21, 2008	Kitt Peak	Spacewatch	(5)	880 m	MPC · JPL
476746	2008 UZ_{57}	—	October 6, 2008	Kitt Peak	Spacewatch	3:2	5.0 km	MPC · JPL
476747	2008 UB_{59}	—	September 26, 2008	Kitt Peak	Spacewatch	·	860 m	MPC · JPL
476748	2008 UF_{59}	—	October 21, 2008	Kitt Peak	Spacewatch	T_{j} (2.97) · 3:2	5.2 km	MPC · JPL
476749	2008 UG_{60}	—	October 9, 2008	Kitt Peak	Spacewatch	·	1.0 km	MPC · JPL
476750	2008 UJ_{61}	—	September 28, 2008	Mount Lemmon	Mount Lemmon Survey	·	810 m	MPC · JPL
476751	2008 UY_{61}	—	October 21, 2008	Kitt Peak	Spacewatch	·	670 m	MPC · JPL
476752	2008 UZ_{62}	—	September 28, 2008	Mount Lemmon	Mount Lemmon Survey	·	600 m	MPC · JPL
476753	2008 UB_{64}	—	October 7, 2008	Mount Lemmon	Mount Lemmon Survey	·	1.0 km	MPC · JPL
476754	2008 UJ_{66}	—	October 21, 2008	Kitt Peak	Spacewatch	·	890 m	MPC · JPL
476755	2008 UA_{71}	—	October 21, 2008	Kitt Peak	Spacewatch	·	1.8 km	MPC · JPL
476756	2008 UR_{72}	—	October 21, 2008	Mount Lemmon	Mount Lemmon Survey	·	1.1 km	MPC · JPL
476757	2008 UB_{73}	—	October 21, 2008	Mount Lemmon	Mount Lemmon Survey	·	980 m	MPC · JPL
476758	2008 UJ_{73}	—	September 23, 2008	Catalina	CSS	·	1.2 km	MPC · JPL
476759	2008 UJ_{74}	—	October 21, 2008	Kitt Peak	Spacewatch	·	1.3 km	MPC · JPL
476760	2008 UH_{76}	—	October 21, 2008	Kitt Peak	Spacewatch	·	1 km	MPC · JPL
476761	2008 UV_{76}	—	October 21, 2008	Kitt Peak	Spacewatch	·	1.2 km	MPC · JPL
476762	2008 UU_{79}	—	September 29, 2008	Mount Lemmon	Mount Lemmon Survey	·	890 m	MPC · JPL
476763	2008 UP_{90}	—	October 27, 2008	Catalina	CSS	·	2.4 km	MPC · JPL
476764	2008 UY_{99}	—	October 27, 2008	Bisei SG Center	BATTeRS	T_{j} (2.99) · 3:2	4.3 km	MPC · JPL
476765	2008 UT_{108}	—	October 21, 2008	Kitt Peak	Spacewatch	·	1.3 km	MPC · JPL
476766	2008 UX_{109}	—	October 22, 2008	Kitt Peak	Spacewatch	·	1.3 km	MPC · JPL
476767	2008 UZ_{109}	—	October 22, 2008	Kitt Peak	Spacewatch	·	1.2 km	MPC · JPL
476768	2008 UN_{111}	—	October 22, 2008	Kitt Peak	Spacewatch	·	880 m	MPC · JPL
476769	2008 UV_{112}	—	October 9, 2008	Kitt Peak	Spacewatch	·	570 m	MPC · JPL
476770	2008 UN_{113}	—	October 9, 2008	Kitt Peak	Spacewatch	·	1.0 km	MPC · JPL
476771	2008 UG_{116}	—	October 22, 2008	Kitt Peak	Spacewatch	BRG	1.2 km	MPC · JPL
476772	2008 UL_{118}	—	October 22, 2008	Kitt Peak	Spacewatch	·	1.1 km	MPC · JPL
476773	2008 US_{120}	—	October 22, 2008	Kitt Peak	Spacewatch	·	1.5 km	MPC · JPL
476774	2008 UR_{123}	—	October 22, 2008	Kitt Peak	Spacewatch	(5)	950 m	MPC · JPL
476775	2008 UT_{125}	—	October 22, 2008	Kitt Peak	Spacewatch	(194)	2.0 km	MPC · JPL
476776	2008 UH_{126}	—	October 22, 2008	Kitt Peak	Spacewatch	·	1.5 km	MPC · JPL
476777	2008 UJ_{126}	—	October 4, 2008	Mount Lemmon	Mount Lemmon Survey	·	1.1 km	MPC · JPL
476778	2008 UF_{128}	—	October 22, 2008	Kitt Peak	Spacewatch	·	1.5 km	MPC · JPL
476779	2008 UQ_{128}	—	October 7, 2008	Mount Lemmon	Mount Lemmon Survey	·	860 m	MPC · JPL
476780	2008 UC_{131}	—	October 23, 2008	Kitt Peak	Spacewatch	·	800 m	MPC · JPL
476781	2008 UP_{132}	—	October 23, 2008	Kitt Peak	Spacewatch	·	1.1 km	MPC · JPL
476782	2008 UC_{133}	—	October 23, 2008	Kitt Peak	Spacewatch	(5)	880 m	MPC · JPL
476783	2008 UK_{134}	—	October 6, 2008	Kitt Peak	Spacewatch	KON	1.8 km	MPC · JPL
476784	2008 UZ_{134}	—	October 23, 2008	Kitt Peak	Spacewatch	H	560 m	MPC · JPL
476785	2008 UZ_{141}	—	September 23, 2008	Mount Lemmon	Mount Lemmon Survey	·	970 m	MPC · JPL
476786	2008 UV_{145}	—	October 23, 2008	Kitt Peak	Spacewatch	(5)	1.2 km	MPC · JPL
476787	2008 UP_{146}	—	October 23, 2008	Kitt Peak	Spacewatch	·	920 m	MPC · JPL
476788	2008 UB_{149}	—	October 23, 2008	Kitt Peak	Spacewatch	·	1 km	MPC · JPL
476789	2008 UJ_{149}	—	September 24, 2008	Kitt Peak	Spacewatch	·	810 m	MPC · JPL
476790	2008 UD_{156}	—	October 9, 2008	Mount Lemmon	Mount Lemmon Survey	·	1.6 km	MPC · JPL
476791	2008 UL_{156}	—	October 23, 2008	Mount Lemmon	Mount Lemmon Survey	·	980 m	MPC · JPL
476792	2008 UU_{156}	—	October 9, 2008	Mount Lemmon	Mount Lemmon Survey	·	1.7 km	MPC · JPL
476793	2008 UV_{156}	—	October 23, 2008	Mount Lemmon	Mount Lemmon Survey	·	940 m	MPC · JPL
476794	2008 UJ_{158}	—	October 23, 2008	Kitt Peak	Spacewatch	·	1.4 km	MPC · JPL
476795	2008 UN_{158}	—	October 23, 2008	Kitt Peak	Spacewatch	KON	1.7 km	MPC · JPL
476796	2008 UY_{162}	—	October 24, 2008	Kitt Peak	Spacewatch	·	1.2 km	MPC · JPL
476797	2008 UD_{163}	—	October 10, 2008	Mount Lemmon	Mount Lemmon Survey	·	1.2 km	MPC · JPL
476798	2008 UA_{164}	—	October 10, 2008	Mount Lemmon	Mount Lemmon Survey	·	750 m	MPC · JPL
476799	2008 UB_{164}	—	October 10, 2008	Mount Lemmon	Mount Lemmon Survey	·	680 m	MPC · JPL
476800	2008 UJ_{166}	—	October 24, 2008	Kitt Peak	Spacewatch	·	1.6 km	MPC · JPL

== 476801–476900 ==
back to top

Designation			Discovery			Properties		Ref
Permanent	Provisional	Named after	Date	Site	Discoverer(s)	Category	Diam.	Ref
476801	2008 UY_{167}	—	October 24, 2008	Kitt Peak	Spacewatch	·	750 m	MPC · JPL
476802	2008 UG_{168}	—	October 24, 2008	Kitt Peak	Spacewatch	·	960 m	MPC · JPL
476803	2008 UJ_{169}	—	October 24, 2008	Kitt Peak	Spacewatch	·	590 m	MPC · JPL
476804	2008 UY_{169}	—	October 24, 2008	Catalina	CSS	·	1.3 km	MPC · JPL
476805	2008 UW_{176}	—	October 24, 2008	Mount Lemmon	Mount Lemmon Survey	3:2	4.3 km	MPC · JPL
476806	2008 UJ_{185}	—	October 24, 2008	Kitt Peak	Spacewatch	·	1.3 km	MPC · JPL
476807	2008 UP_{188}	—	October 24, 2008	Kitt Peak	Spacewatch	·	1.4 km	MPC · JPL
476808	2008 UJ_{190}	—	October 25, 2008	Mount Lemmon	Mount Lemmon Survey	NYS	840 m	MPC · JPL
476809	2008 UK_{193}	—	October 25, 2008	Mount Lemmon	Mount Lemmon Survey	EUN	1.1 km	MPC · JPL
476810	2008 UM_{193}	—	October 20, 2008	Kitt Peak	Spacewatch	H	480 m	MPC · JPL
476811	2008 UD_{196}	—	May 9, 2007	Kitt Peak	Spacewatch	·	1.1 km	MPC · JPL
476812	2008 UN_{196}	—	September 29, 2008	Kitt Peak	Spacewatch	·	920 m	MPC · JPL
476813	2008 UT_{199}	—	October 31, 2008	Magdalena Ridge	Ryan, W. H.	H	390 m	MPC · JPL
476814	2008 UB_{206}	—	October 22, 2008	Kitt Peak	Spacewatch	EUN	1.2 km	MPC · JPL
476815	2008 UD_{207}	—	October 6, 2008	Mount Lemmon	Mount Lemmon Survey	·	1.1 km	MPC · JPL
476816	2008 UP_{207}	—	October 2, 2008	Kitt Peak	Spacewatch	·	940 m	MPC · JPL
476817	2008 UV_{209}	—	October 6, 2008	Kitt Peak	Spacewatch	·	760 m	MPC · JPL
476818	2008 UV_{222}	—	October 25, 2008	Kitt Peak	Spacewatch	·	1.4 km	MPC · JPL
476819	2008 UG_{240}	—	October 26, 2008	Kitt Peak	Spacewatch	BRG	1.1 km	MPC · JPL
476820	2008 UJ_{242}	—	October 26, 2008	Kitt Peak	Spacewatch	·	1.9 km	MPC · JPL
476821	2008 UA_{243}	—	October 26, 2008	Kitt Peak	Spacewatch	·	2.6 km	MPC · JPL
476822	2008 UG_{245}	—	October 26, 2008	Kitt Peak	Spacewatch	JUN	1.3 km	MPC · JPL
476823	2008 UU_{245}	—	October 26, 2008	Kitt Peak	Spacewatch	MAR	1.1 km	MPC · JPL
476824	2008 UJ_{248}	—	October 26, 2008	Kitt Peak	Spacewatch	·	890 m	MPC · JPL
476825	2008 UL_{254}	—	September 22, 2008	Mount Lemmon	Mount Lemmon Survey	EUN	1.3 km	MPC · JPL
476826	2008 UO_{261}	—	October 9, 2008	Mount Lemmon	Mount Lemmon Survey	·	1.3 km	MPC · JPL
476827	2008 UF_{263}	—	October 27, 2008	Kitt Peak	Spacewatch	·	1.2 km	MPC · JPL
476828	2008 UH_{272}	—	October 28, 2008	Kitt Peak	Spacewatch	·	990 m	MPC · JPL
476829	2008 UB_{278}	—	October 28, 2008	Mount Lemmon	Mount Lemmon Survey	·	1.2 km	MPC · JPL
476830	2008 UP_{279}	—	September 24, 2008	Mount Lemmon	Mount Lemmon Survey	·	950 m	MPC · JPL
476831	2008 US_{279}	—	September 29, 2008	Kitt Peak	Spacewatch	·	1.3 km	MPC · JPL
476832	2008 UB_{280}	—	October 28, 2008	Kitt Peak	Spacewatch	·	630 m	MPC · JPL
476833	2008 UU_{281}	—	October 24, 2008	Kitt Peak	Spacewatch	·	1.5 km	MPC · JPL
476834	2008 UP_{284}	—	October 20, 2008	Kitt Peak	Spacewatch	·	970 m	MPC · JPL
476835	2008 UC_{286}	—	September 29, 2008	Kitt Peak	Spacewatch	(5)	980 m	MPC · JPL
476836	2008 UL_{295}	—	October 29, 2008	Kitt Peak	Spacewatch	·	840 m	MPC · JPL
476837	2008 UD_{296}	—	October 29, 2008	Kitt Peak	Spacewatch	·	850 m	MPC · JPL
476838	2008 UO_{298}	—	October 29, 2008	Kitt Peak	Spacewatch	·	1.1 km	MPC · JPL
476839	2008 UT_{300}	—	October 29, 2008	Kitt Peak	Spacewatch	(5)	1.1 km	MPC · JPL
476840	2008 UB_{301}	—	October 29, 2008	Kitt Peak	Spacewatch	·	1.3 km	MPC · JPL
476841	2008 UG_{302}	—	October 29, 2008	Kitt Peak	Spacewatch	·	990 m	MPC · JPL
476842	2008 UN_{304}	—	October 29, 2008	Kitt Peak	Spacewatch	·	1.1 km	MPC · JPL
476843	2008 UO_{304}	—	October 29, 2008	Kitt Peak	Spacewatch	·	880 m	MPC · JPL
476844	2008 UF_{306}	—	October 30, 2008	Kitt Peak	Spacewatch	·	1.2 km	MPC · JPL
476845	2008 UC_{308}	—	September 25, 2008	Mount Lemmon	Mount Lemmon Survey	MAR	1.0 km	MPC · JPL
476846	2008 UG_{308}	—	October 30, 2008	Kitt Peak	Spacewatch	·	1.0 km	MPC · JPL
476847	2008 UR_{308}	—	October 30, 2008	Kitt Peak	Spacewatch	·	2.4 km	MPC · JPL
476848	2008 UQ_{321}	—	October 31, 2008	Mount Lemmon	Mount Lemmon Survey	EUN	680 m	MPC · JPL
476849	2008 UY_{322}	—	October 8, 2008	Mount Lemmon	Mount Lemmon Survey	·	900 m	MPC · JPL
476850	2008 UU_{325}	—	December 2, 2004	Kitt Peak	Spacewatch	·	790 m	MPC · JPL
476851	2008 UN_{326}	—	October 10, 2008	Catalina	CSS	·	1.6 km	MPC · JPL
476852	2008 UQ_{326}	—	October 31, 2008	Mount Lemmon	Mount Lemmon Survey	·	1.3 km	MPC · JPL
476853	2008 UT_{326}	—	October 31, 2008	Mount Lemmon	Mount Lemmon Survey	·	2.7 km	MPC · JPL
476854	2008 UV_{330}	—	October 31, 2008	Kitt Peak	Spacewatch	·	940 m	MPC · JPL
476855	2008 UB_{335}	—	October 20, 2008	Mount Lemmon	Mount Lemmon Survey	(5)	940 m	MPC · JPL
476856	2008 UW_{336}	—	October 20, 2008	Kitt Peak	Spacewatch	·	1.7 km	MPC · JPL
476857	2008 US_{337}	—	October 20, 2008	Kitt Peak	Spacewatch	·	1.1 km	MPC · JPL
476858	2008 UJ_{340}	—	October 23, 2008	Kitt Peak	Spacewatch	·	1.1 km	MPC · JPL
476859	2008 UM_{341}	—	October 26, 2008	Kitt Peak	Spacewatch	·	1.2 km	MPC · JPL
476860	2008 UW_{344}	—	October 30, 2008	Kitt Peak	Spacewatch	JUN	990 m	MPC · JPL
476861	2008 UE_{350}	—	April 21, 2006	Kitt Peak	Spacewatch	MAR	1.1 km	MPC · JPL
476862	2008 UA_{352}	—	October 30, 2008	Catalina	CSS	·	1.3 km	MPC · JPL
476863	2008 UY_{354}	—	October 29, 2008	Kitt Peak	Spacewatch	(5)	1.0 km	MPC · JPL
476864	2008 UC_{356}	—	October 20, 2008	Kitt Peak	Spacewatch	·	1.4 km	MPC · JPL
476865	2008 UP_{361}	—	October 31, 2008	Catalina	CSS	H	560 m	MPC · JPL
476866	2008 UK_{365}	—	October 24, 2008	Catalina	CSS	·	1.7 km	MPC · JPL
476867	2008 VD_{5}	—	November 6, 2008	Cordell-Lorenz	Cordell-Lorenz	(5)	1.2 km	MPC · JPL
476868	2008 VS_{8}	—	October 22, 2008	Kitt Peak	Spacewatch	·	1 km	MPC · JPL
476869	2008 VU_{10}	—	September 27, 2008	Mount Lemmon	Mount Lemmon Survey	·	890 m	MPC · JPL
476870	2008 VO_{14}	—	October 25, 2008	Catalina	CSS	·	960 m	MPC · JPL
476871	2008 VC_{15}	—	October 1, 2008	Kitt Peak	Spacewatch	·	1.0 km	MPC · JPL
476872	2008 VT_{19}	—	November 1, 2008	Mount Lemmon	Mount Lemmon Survey	MAR	770 m	MPC · JPL
476873	2008 VR_{23}	—	September 29, 2008	Mount Lemmon	Mount Lemmon Survey	fast	1.0 km	MPC · JPL
476874	2008 VE_{24}	—	November 1, 2008	Kitt Peak	Spacewatch	·	730 m	MPC · JPL
476875	2008 VT_{24}	—	September 29, 2008	Mount Lemmon	Mount Lemmon Survey	·	940 m	MPC · JPL
476876	2008 VG_{27}	—	October 21, 2008	Kitt Peak	Spacewatch	(5)	1.2 km	MPC · JPL
476877	2008 VL_{30}	—	November 2, 2008	Kitt Peak	Spacewatch	·	1.0 km	MPC · JPL
476878	2008 VC_{34}	—	November 2, 2008	Mount Lemmon	Mount Lemmon Survey	·	1.7 km	MPC · JPL
476879	2008 VW_{39}	—	October 4, 2008	Mount Lemmon	Mount Lemmon Survey	·	1.3 km	MPC · JPL
476880	2008 VN_{40}	—	November 3, 2008	Kitt Peak	Spacewatch	·	810 m	MPC · JPL
476881	2008 VJ_{43}	—	November 3, 2008	Kitt Peak	Spacewatch	·	2.6 km	MPC · JPL
476882	2008 VN_{45}	—	October 9, 2008	Mount Lemmon	Mount Lemmon Survey	·	1.6 km	MPC · JPL
476883	2008 VV_{46}	—	October 24, 2008	Kitt Peak	Spacewatch	·	850 m	MPC · JPL
476884	2008 VR_{50}	—	September 6, 2008	Mount Lemmon	Mount Lemmon Survey	·	1.1 km	MPC · JPL
476885	2008 VF_{62}	—	October 27, 2008	Kitt Peak	Spacewatch	·	940 m	MPC · JPL
476886	2008 VW_{66}	—	November 6, 2008	Mount Lemmon	Mount Lemmon Survey	·	1.4 km	MPC · JPL
476887	2008 VV_{71}	—	November 9, 2008	Mount Lemmon	Mount Lemmon Survey	(5)	1.5 km	MPC · JPL
476888	2008 VT_{73}	—	November 7, 2008	Mount Lemmon	Mount Lemmon Survey	·	1.1 km	MPC · JPL
476889	2008 VK_{74}	—	November 8, 2008	Kitt Peak	Spacewatch	KON	1.8 km	MPC · JPL
476890	2008 VY_{77}	—	November 7, 2008	Mount Lemmon	Mount Lemmon Survey	MAR	1.0 km	MPC · JPL
476891	2008 VJ_{78}	—	November 7, 2008	Mount Lemmon	Mount Lemmon Survey	·	1.0 km	MPC · JPL
476892	2008 WU	—	October 20, 2008	Kitt Peak	Spacewatch	·	1.4 km	MPC · JPL
476893	2008 WB_{10}	—	November 7, 2008	Mount Lemmon	Mount Lemmon Survey	·	1.3 km	MPC · JPL
476894	2008 WR_{12}	—	October 25, 2008	Kitt Peak	Spacewatch	·	2.0 km	MPC · JPL
476895	2008 WT_{12}	—	November 18, 2008	Catalina	CSS	·	1.0 km	MPC · JPL
476896	2008 WU_{19}	—	October 31, 2008	Kitt Peak	Spacewatch	·	1.3 km	MPC · JPL
476897	2008 WJ_{20}	—	October 28, 2008	Kitt Peak	Spacewatch	·	1.2 km	MPC · JPL
476898	2008 WS_{21}	—	November 17, 2008	Kitt Peak	Spacewatch	·	980 m	MPC · JPL
476899	2008 WD_{23}	—	November 18, 2008	Catalina	CSS	T_{j} (2.99) · 3:2 · SHU	5.9 km	MPC · JPL
476900	2008 WE_{28}	—	October 31, 2008	Kitt Peak	Spacewatch	3:2	4.2 km	MPC · JPL

== 476901–477000 ==
back to top

Designation			Discovery			Properties		Ref
Permanent	Provisional	Named after	Date	Site	Discoverer(s)	Category	Diam.	Ref
476901	2008 WA_{30}	—	November 19, 2008	Mount Lemmon	Mount Lemmon Survey	·	3.3 km	MPC · JPL
476902	2008 WQ_{30}	—	November 19, 2008	Mount Lemmon	Mount Lemmon Survey	·	1.2 km	MPC · JPL
476903	2008 WS_{30}	—	November 19, 2008	Mount Lemmon	Mount Lemmon Survey	(5)	950 m	MPC · JPL
476904	2008 WK_{32}	—	November 21, 2008	Kitt Peak	Spacewatch	APO	530 m	MPC · JPL
476905	2008 WB_{33}	—	October 7, 2008	Mount Lemmon	Mount Lemmon Survey	H	560 m	MPC · JPL
476906	2008 WK_{39}	—	October 9, 2008	Mount Lemmon	Mount Lemmon Survey	·	760 m	MPC · JPL
476907	2008 WS_{39}	—	October 23, 2008	Mount Lemmon	Mount Lemmon Survey	·	1.1 km	MPC · JPL
476908	2008 WF_{40}	—	November 17, 2008	Kitt Peak	Spacewatch	·	990 m	MPC · JPL
476909	2008 WU_{40}	—	September 27, 2008	Mount Lemmon	Mount Lemmon Survey	(5)	1.1 km	MPC · JPL
476910	2008 WN_{42}	—	November 17, 2008	Kitt Peak	Spacewatch	WIT	880 m	MPC · JPL
476911	2008 WO_{44}	—	October 26, 2008	Kitt Peak	Spacewatch	·	1.4 km	MPC · JPL
476912	2008 WW_{50}	—	October 22, 2008	Kitt Peak	Spacewatch	·	1.2 km	MPC · JPL
476913	2008 WF_{56}	—	September 9, 2008	Mount Lemmon	Mount Lemmon Survey	·	1.7 km	MPC · JPL
476914	2008 WJ_{61}	—	November 23, 2008	La Sagra	OAM	H	540 m	MPC · JPL
476915	2008 WH_{63}	—	November 20, 2008	Socorro	LINEAR	·	3.1 km	MPC · JPL
476916	2008 WY_{72}	—	November 19, 2008	Mount Lemmon	Mount Lemmon Survey	·	1.4 km	MPC · JPL
476917	2008 WN_{73}	—	November 19, 2008	Mount Lemmon	Mount Lemmon Survey	·	1.3 km	MPC · JPL
476918	2008 WS_{73}	—	November 19, 2008	Kitt Peak	Spacewatch	(5)	1.4 km	MPC · JPL
476919	2008 WK_{83}	—	November 20, 2008	Kitt Peak	Spacewatch	fast	1.1 km	MPC · JPL
476920	2008 WE_{94}	—	September 29, 2008	Mount Lemmon	Mount Lemmon Survey	(5)	1.3 km	MPC · JPL
476921	2008 WM_{96}	—	October 21, 2008	Kitt Peak	Spacewatch	KON	2.3 km	MPC · JPL
476922	2008 WN_{98}	—	October 27, 2008	Mount Lemmon	Mount Lemmon Survey	·	1.4 km	MPC · JPL
476923	2008 WH_{99}	—	September 27, 2008	Mount Lemmon	Mount Lemmon Survey	(5)	1.1 km	MPC · JPL
476924	2008 WG_{102}	—	September 23, 2008	Mount Lemmon	Mount Lemmon Survey	·	990 m	MPC · JPL
476925	2008 WQ_{109}	—	November 21, 2008	Kitt Peak	Spacewatch	·	1.1 km	MPC · JPL
476926	2008 WF_{113}	—	November 30, 2008	Kitt Peak	Spacewatch	(5)	820 m	MPC · JPL
476927	2008 WM_{113}	—	November 30, 2008	Kitt Peak	Spacewatch	(5)	1.2 km	MPC · JPL
476928	2008 WW_{117}	—	November 30, 2008	Mount Lemmon	Mount Lemmon Survey	·	990 m	MPC · JPL
476929	2008 WV_{122}	—	November 30, 2008	Kitt Peak	Spacewatch	·	1.2 km	MPC · JPL
476930	2008 WP_{123}	—	November 30, 2008	Mount Lemmon	Mount Lemmon Survey	·	1.5 km	MPC · JPL
476931	2008 WB_{125}	—	November 21, 2008	Mount Lemmon	Mount Lemmon Survey	·	2.1 km	MPC · JPL
476932	2008 WD_{126}	—	November 30, 2008	Kitt Peak	Spacewatch	·	1.2 km	MPC · JPL
476933	2008 WQ_{126}	—	November 20, 2008	Mount Lemmon	Mount Lemmon Survey	·	1.0 km	MPC · JPL
476934	2008 WB_{128}	—	November 22, 2008	Kitt Peak	Spacewatch	·	2.1 km	MPC · JPL
476935	2008 WP_{129}	—	November 30, 2008	Kitt Peak	Spacewatch	·	1.4 km	MPC · JPL
476936	2008 WX_{129}	—	November 18, 2008	Kitt Peak	Spacewatch	·	2.1 km	MPC · JPL
476937	2008 WP_{133}	—	November 17, 2008	Catalina	CSS	·	2.8 km	MPC · JPL
476938	2008 WY_{136}	—	November 21, 2008	Socorro	LINEAR	RAF	1.1 km	MPC · JPL
476939	2008 WL_{138}	—	November 30, 2008	Kitt Peak	Spacewatch	·	1.8 km	MPC · JPL
476940	2008 WK_{139}	—	November 30, 2008	Socorro	LINEAR	·	1.6 km	MPC · JPL
476941	2008 WR_{140}	—	November 18, 2008	Kitt Peak	Spacewatch	·	1.3 km	MPC · JPL
476942	2008 WS_{140}	—	October 20, 2008	Kitt Peak	Spacewatch	·	1.0 km	MPC · JPL
476943	2008 XC	—	November 7, 2008	Mount Lemmon	Mount Lemmon Survey	·	1.0 km	MPC · JPL
476944	2008 XY_{2}	—	November 30, 2008	Mount Lemmon	Mount Lemmon Survey	·	1.4 km	MPC · JPL
476945	2008 XG_{3}	—	December 3, 2008	Marly	P. Kocher	·	2.7 km	MPC · JPL
476946	2008 XH_{4}	—	November 18, 2008	Catalina	CSS	·	1.6 km	MPC · JPL
476947	2008 XZ_{4}	—	October 30, 2008	Kitt Peak	Spacewatch	·	1.0 km	MPC · JPL
476948	2008 XT_{16}	—	December 1, 2008	Kitt Peak	Spacewatch	·	860 m	MPC · JPL
476949	2008 XA_{17}	—	December 1, 2008	Kitt Peak	Spacewatch	·	1.3 km	MPC · JPL
476950	2008 XA_{24}	—	October 30, 2008	Kitt Peak	Spacewatch	·	1.1 km	MPC · JPL
476951	2008 XE_{28}	—	October 25, 2008	Kitt Peak	Spacewatch	·	1.4 km	MPC · JPL
476952	2008 XH_{34}	—	October 29, 2008	Kitt Peak	Spacewatch	·	1.1 km	MPC · JPL
476953	2008 XO_{34}	—	December 2, 2008	Kitt Peak	Spacewatch	EUN	1.1 km	MPC · JPL
476954	2008 XB_{35}	—	December 2, 2008	Kitt Peak	Spacewatch	·	1.9 km	MPC · JPL
476955	2008 XK_{36}	—	December 2, 2008	Kitt Peak	Spacewatch	(5)	860 m	MPC · JPL
476956	2008 XK_{38}	—	November 20, 2008	Kitt Peak	Spacewatch	·	1.1 km	MPC · JPL
476957	2008 XG_{41}	—	December 2, 2008	Mount Lemmon	Mount Lemmon Survey	·	3.4 km	MPC · JPL
476958	2008 XZ_{41}	—	December 2, 2008	Kitt Peak	Spacewatch	·	1.0 km	MPC · JPL
476959	2008 XE_{48}	—	December 4, 2008	Mount Lemmon	Mount Lemmon Survey	HOF	2.6 km	MPC · JPL
476960	2008 XS_{49}	—	December 7, 2008	Mount Lemmon	Mount Lemmon Survey	·	2.6 km	MPC · JPL
476961	2008 XJ_{53}	—	December 5, 2008	Mount Lemmon	Mount Lemmon Survey	(5)	1.6 km	MPC · JPL
476962	2008 XW_{53}	—	December 1, 2008	Socorro	LINEAR	·	830 m	MPC · JPL
476963	2008 XA_{56}	—	December 1, 2008	Mount Lemmon	Mount Lemmon Survey	(5)	1.3 km	MPC · JPL
476964	2008 YK_{1}	—	December 4, 2008	Kitt Peak	Spacewatch	EUN	1.4 km	MPC · JPL
476965	2008 YG_{4}	—	December 22, 2008	Dauban	Kugel, F.	EUN	1.0 km	MPC · JPL
476966	2008 YS_{4}	—	December 22, 2008	Dauban	Kugel, F.	·	1.6 km	MPC · JPL
476967	2008 YL_{13}	—	October 6, 2008	Catalina	CSS	·	1.7 km	MPC · JPL
476968	2008 YO_{13}	—	October 31, 2008	Mount Lemmon	Mount Lemmon Survey	·	1.4 km	MPC · JPL
476969	2008 YU_{13}	—	October 24, 2008	Mount Lemmon	Mount Lemmon Survey	·	1.7 km	MPC · JPL
476970	2008 YG_{16}	—	December 21, 2008	Mount Lemmon	Mount Lemmon Survey	(5)	1.0 km	MPC · JPL
476971	2008 YZ_{16}	—	November 24, 2008	Mount Lemmon	Mount Lemmon Survey	JUN	860 m	MPC · JPL
476972	2008 YB_{21}	—	December 21, 2008	Mount Lemmon	Mount Lemmon Survey	·	1.2 km	MPC · JPL
476973	2008 YF_{21}	—	December 21, 2008	Mount Lemmon	Mount Lemmon Survey	ADE	2.1 km	MPC · JPL
476974	2008 YS_{31}	—	December 29, 2008	Bergisch Gladbach	W. Bickel	EUN	990 m	MPC · JPL
476975	2008 YC_{37}	—	December 22, 2008	Kitt Peak	Spacewatch	·	1.6 km	MPC · JPL
476976	2008 YQ_{38}	—	December 29, 2008	Catalina	CSS	·	1.8 km	MPC · JPL
476977	2008 YM_{49}	—	December 29, 2008	Mount Lemmon	Mount Lemmon Survey	(5)	1.1 km	MPC · JPL
476978	2008 YT_{49}	—	December 29, 2008	Mount Lemmon	Mount Lemmon Survey	·	1.4 km	MPC · JPL
476979	2008 YO_{51}	—	December 29, 2008	Mount Lemmon	Mount Lemmon Survey	·	1.3 km	MPC · JPL
476980	2008 YZ_{53}	—	December 29, 2008	Mount Lemmon	Mount Lemmon Survey	·	1.2 km	MPC · JPL
476981	2008 YT_{54}	—	December 29, 2008	Mount Lemmon	Mount Lemmon Survey	(5)	960 m	MPC · JPL
476982	2008 YZ_{54}	—	December 29, 2008	Mount Lemmon	Mount Lemmon Survey	AGN	1.1 km	MPC · JPL
476983	2008 YE_{59}	—	December 22, 2008	Kitt Peak	Spacewatch	·	1.0 km	MPC · JPL
476984	2008 YA_{65}	—	December 30, 2008	Mount Lemmon	Mount Lemmon Survey	·	1.7 km	MPC · JPL
476985	2008 YC_{73}	—	December 30, 2008	Kitt Peak	Spacewatch	·	1.7 km	MPC · JPL
476986	2008 YE_{81}	—	November 19, 2008	Mount Lemmon	Mount Lemmon Survey	·	1.2 km	MPC · JPL
476987	2008 YF_{81}	—	December 30, 2008	Purple Mountain	PMO NEO Survey Program	·	2.8 km	MPC · JPL
476988	2008 YA_{93}	—	December 21, 2008	Mount Lemmon	Mount Lemmon Survey	·	1.5 km	MPC · JPL
476989	2008 YH_{95}	—	December 29, 2008	Kitt Peak	Spacewatch	·	1.7 km	MPC · JPL
476990	2008 YM_{98}	—	December 29, 2008	Kitt Peak	Spacewatch	·	1.2 km	MPC · JPL
476991	2008 YU_{102}	—	December 21, 2008	Kitt Peak	Spacewatch	·	2.0 km	MPC · JPL
476992	2008 YA_{104}	—	December 29, 2008	Kitt Peak	Spacewatch	AGN	1.0 km	MPC · JPL
476993	2008 YE_{108}	—	December 29, 2008	Kitt Peak	Spacewatch	·	1.8 km	MPC · JPL
476994	2008 YZ_{108}	—	December 29, 2008	Kitt Peak	Spacewatch	HOF	2.6 km	MPC · JPL
476995	2008 YV_{109}	—	November 7, 2008	Mount Lemmon	Mount Lemmon Survey	(5)	1.1 km	MPC · JPL
476996	2008 YW_{111}	—	December 31, 2008	Kitt Peak	Spacewatch	·	2.6 km	MPC · JPL
476997	2008 YN_{115}	—	December 29, 2008	Kitt Peak	Spacewatch	MIS	2.0 km	MPC · JPL
476998	2008 YN_{122}	—	December 22, 2008	Mount Lemmon	Mount Lemmon Survey	·	1.6 km	MPC · JPL
476999	2008 YL_{124}	—	December 30, 2008	Kitt Peak	Spacewatch	·	1.7 km	MPC · JPL
477000	2008 YN_{125}	—	December 30, 2008	Kitt Peak	Spacewatch	·	1.6 km	MPC · JPL

back to top
