= List of minor planets: 477001–478000 =

The following is a partial list of minor planets, running from minor-planet number 477001 through 478000, inclusive. The primary data for this and other partial lists is based on JPL's "Small-Body Orbital Elements" and data available from the Minor Planet Center. Critical list information is also provided by the MPC, unless otherwise specified from Lowell Observatory. A detailed description of the table's columns and additional sources are given on the main page including a complete list of every page in this series, and a statistical break-up on the dynamical classification of minor planets.

Also see the summary list of all named bodies in numerical and alphabetical order, and the corresponding naming citations for the number range of this particular list. New namings may only be added to this list after official publication, as the preannouncement of names is condemned by the Working Group for Small Bodies Nomenclature of the International Astronomical Union.

Near-Earth obj.	MBA (inner)	MBA (outer)	Centaur
Mars-crosser	MBA (middle)	Jupiter trojan	Trans-Neptunian obj.
Unclassified

== 477001–477100 ==
Designation			Discovery			Properties		Ref
Permanent	Provisional	Named after	Date	Site	Discoverer(s)	Category	Diam.	Ref
477001	2008 YF_{127}	—	December 30, 2008	Kitt Peak	Spacewatch	EUN	1.3 km	MPC · JPL
477002	2008 YT_{128}	—	December 31, 2008	Kitt Peak	Spacewatch	·	1.2 km	MPC · JPL
477003	2008 YE_{132}	—	December 31, 2008	Kitt Peak	Spacewatch	·	1.5 km	MPC · JPL
477004	2008 YG_{133}	—	December 29, 2008	Kitt Peak	Spacewatch	·	2.9 km	MPC · JPL
477005	2008 YO_{133}	—	December 29, 2008	Kitt Peak	Spacewatch	·	1.8 km	MPC · JPL
477006	2008 YH_{136}	—	December 30, 2008	Kitt Peak	Spacewatch	·	1.4 km	MPC · JPL
477007	2008 YB_{140}	—	December 30, 2008	Kitt Peak	Spacewatch	·	1.6 km	MPC · JPL
477008	2008 YB_{143}	—	October 30, 2008	Mount Lemmon	Mount Lemmon Survey	·	1.4 km	MPC · JPL
477009	2008 YH_{146}	—	December 22, 2008	Kitt Peak	Spacewatch	NEM	1.8 km	MPC · JPL
477010	2008 YO_{146}	—	December 30, 2008	Kitt Peak	Spacewatch	·	1.5 km	MPC · JPL
477011	2008 YJ_{150}	—	December 21, 2008	Kitt Peak	Spacewatch	·	1.4 km	MPC · JPL
477012	2008 YP_{150}	—	December 22, 2008	Kitt Peak	Spacewatch	·	1.3 km	MPC · JPL
477013	2008 YA_{151}	—	November 20, 2008	Mount Lemmon	Mount Lemmon Survey	·	1.1 km	MPC · JPL
477014	2008 YW_{154}	—	December 22, 2008	Mount Lemmon	Mount Lemmon Survey	(18466)	2.7 km	MPC · JPL
477015	2008 YV_{156}	—	December 30, 2008	Kitt Peak	Spacewatch	·	1.7 km	MPC · JPL
477016	2008 YT_{159}	—	December 22, 2008	Mount Lemmon	Mount Lemmon Survey	HOF	2.3 km	MPC · JPL
477017	2008 YZ_{159}	—	December 29, 2008	Kitt Peak	Spacewatch	WIT	1.0 km	MPC · JPL
477018	2008 YQ_{160}	—	December 30, 2008	Mount Lemmon	Mount Lemmon Survey	·	1.3 km	MPC · JPL
477019	2008 YN_{161}	—	December 21, 2008	Mount Lemmon	Mount Lemmon Survey	EUN	920 m	MPC · JPL
477020	2008 YC_{162}	—	February 9, 2005	Mount Lemmon	Mount Lemmon Survey	·	1.0 km	MPC · JPL
477021	2008 YN_{162}	—	December 22, 2008	Kitt Peak	Spacewatch	·	1.6 km	MPC · JPL
477022	2008 YK_{164}	—	December 21, 2008	Mount Lemmon	Mount Lemmon Survey	·	1.0 km	MPC · JPL
477023	2008 YD_{169}	—	December 22, 2008	Mount Lemmon	Mount Lemmon Survey	·	2.6 km	MPC · JPL
477024	2008 YY_{169}	—	December 22, 2008	Kitt Peak	Spacewatch	(5)	950 m	MPC · JPL
477025	2008 YR_{170}	—	December 30, 2008	Kitt Peak	Spacewatch	·	1.5 km	MPC · JPL
477026	2008 YU_{170}	—	March 4, 2005	Mount Lemmon	Mount Lemmon Survey	·	970 m	MPC · JPL
477027	2008 YE_{172}	—	December 31, 2008	Mount Lemmon	Mount Lemmon Survey	·	1.3 km	MPC · JPL
477028	2008 YY_{172}	—	December 29, 2008	Kitt Peak	Spacewatch	·	1.1 km	MPC · JPL
477029	2009 AP_{10}	—	January 2, 2009	Mount Lemmon	Mount Lemmon Survey	·	1.7 km	MPC · JPL
477030	2009 AE_{13}	—	November 8, 2008	Mount Lemmon	Mount Lemmon Survey	·	1.9 km	MPC · JPL
477031	2009 AR_{14}	—	January 2, 2009	Mount Lemmon	Mount Lemmon Survey	·	950 m	MPC · JPL
477032	2009 AT_{15}	—	January 15, 2009	Calar Alto	F. Hormuth	·	2.6 km	MPC · JPL
477033	2009 AZ_{18}	—	January 2, 2009	Kitt Peak	Spacewatch	·	2.4 km	MPC · JPL
477034	2009 AW_{19}	—	November 24, 2008	Mount Lemmon	Mount Lemmon Survey	·	1.7 km	MPC · JPL
477035	2009 AP_{21}	—	January 3, 2009	Kitt Peak	Spacewatch	·	2.3 km	MPC · JPL
477036	2009 AA_{22}	—	January 3, 2009	Kitt Peak	Spacewatch	·	1.9 km	MPC · JPL
477037	2009 AG_{22}	—	December 21, 2008	Mount Lemmon	Mount Lemmon Survey	·	1.9 km	MPC · JPL
477038	2009 AJ_{22}	—	December 21, 2008	Mount Lemmon	Mount Lemmon Survey	(5)	1.2 km	MPC · JPL
477039	2009 AD_{24}	—	December 22, 2008	Mount Lemmon	Mount Lemmon Survey	·	1.1 km	MPC · JPL
477040	2009 AY_{27}	—	December 21, 2008	Kitt Peak	Spacewatch	·	2.5 km	MPC · JPL
477041	2009 AD_{29}	—	November 30, 2008	Mount Lemmon	Mount Lemmon Survey	(5)	1.0 km	MPC · JPL
477042	2009 AJ_{32}	—	January 15, 2009	Kitt Peak	Spacewatch	·	1.8 km	MPC · JPL
477043	2009 AE_{34}	—	January 15, 2009	Kitt Peak	Spacewatch	·	1.6 km	MPC · JPL
477044	2009 AO_{36}	—	November 8, 2008	Mount Lemmon	Mount Lemmon Survey	·	1.2 km	MPC · JPL
477045	2009 AT_{42}	—	January 2, 2009	Kitt Peak	Spacewatch	·	2.1 km	MPC · JPL
477046	2009 AW_{44}	—	December 1, 2008	Mount Lemmon	Mount Lemmon Survey	·	1.2 km	MPC · JPL
477047	2009 AM_{45}	—	January 3, 2009	Mount Lemmon	Mount Lemmon Survey	·	1.4 km	MPC · JPL
477048	2009 AS_{45}	—	January 1, 2009	Kitt Peak	Spacewatch	·	1.7 km	MPC · JPL
477049	2009 AZ_{45}	—	January 2, 2009	Mount Lemmon	Mount Lemmon Survey	·	2.1 km	MPC · JPL
477050	2009 AB_{48}	—	January 1, 2009	Mount Lemmon	Mount Lemmon Survey	·	1.9 km	MPC · JPL
477051	2009 BD_{2}	—	January 19, 2009	Catalina	CSS	AMO +1km	960 m	MPC · JPL
477052	2009 BU_{7}	—	December 31, 2008	Mount Lemmon	Mount Lemmon Survey	H	490 m	MPC · JPL
477053	2009 BC_{10}	—	November 21, 2008	Catalina	CSS	·	1.3 km	MPC · JPL
477054	2009 BD_{10}	—	January 20, 2009	Bergisch Gladbach	W. Bickel	MRX	950 m	MPC · JPL
477055	2009 BU_{11}	—	January 20, 2009	Socorro	LINEAR	·	1.4 km	MPC · JPL
477056	2009 BE_{21}	—	December 22, 2008	Kitt Peak	Spacewatch	(5)	1.1 km	MPC · JPL
477057	2009 BV_{21}	—	December 29, 2008	Kitt Peak	Spacewatch	·	1.5 km	MPC · JPL
477058	2009 BM_{27}	—	January 16, 2009	Kitt Peak	Spacewatch	·	1.9 km	MPC · JPL
477059	2009 BA_{33}	—	January 16, 2009	Kitt Peak	Spacewatch	·	1.3 km	MPC · JPL
477060	2009 BF_{33}	—	January 2, 2009	Mount Lemmon	Mount Lemmon Survey	·	1.8 km	MPC · JPL
477061	2009 BL_{36}	—	January 16, 2009	Kitt Peak	Spacewatch	MRX	890 m	MPC · JPL
477062	2009 BJ_{40}	—	January 16, 2009	Kitt Peak	Spacewatch	ADE	2.0 km	MPC · JPL
477063	2009 BC_{42}	—	January 16, 2009	Kitt Peak	Spacewatch	NEM	2.2 km	MPC · JPL
477064	2009 BB_{43}	—	January 16, 2009	Kitt Peak	Spacewatch	·	1.6 km	MPC · JPL
477065	2009 BE_{53}	—	January 16, 2009	Mount Lemmon	Mount Lemmon Survey	·	2.2 km	MPC · JPL
477066	2009 BG_{57}	—	January 18, 2009	Mount Lemmon	Mount Lemmon Survey	·	1.4 km	MPC · JPL
477067	2009 BB_{58}	—	January 20, 2009	Kitt Peak	Spacewatch	·	1.4 km	MPC · JPL
477068	2009 BS_{58}	—	December 21, 2008	Catalina	CSS	·	1.6 km	MPC · JPL
477069	2009 BA_{59}	—	December 21, 2008	Mount Lemmon	Mount Lemmon Survey	·	1.3 km	MPC · JPL
477070	2009 BM_{63}	—	January 20, 2009	Kitt Peak	Spacewatch	AGN	1.2 km	MPC · JPL
477071	2009 BO_{63}	—	December 1, 2008	Mount Lemmon	Mount Lemmon Survey	·	2.0 km	MPC · JPL
477072	2009 BU_{69}	—	November 8, 2008	Mount Lemmon	Mount Lemmon Survey	·	1.5 km	MPC · JPL
477073	2009 BW_{73}	—	January 2, 2009	Mount Lemmon	Mount Lemmon Survey	MRX	1.1 km	MPC · JPL
477074	2009 BV_{74}	—	December 4, 2008	Catalina	CSS	·	1.6 km	MPC · JPL
477075	2009 BT_{78}	—	January 30, 2009	Socorro	LINEAR	EUN	1.3 km	MPC · JPL
477076	2009 BV_{78}	—	January 30, 2009	Socorro	LINEAR	·	3.7 km	MPC · JPL
477077	2009 BU_{79}	—	January 30, 2009	Socorro	LINEAR	·	940 m	MPC · JPL
477078	2009 BA_{85}	—	January 25, 2009	Kitt Peak	Spacewatch	·	1.9 km	MPC · JPL
477079	2009 BB_{89}	—	January 25, 2009	Kitt Peak	Spacewatch	KOR	1.1 km	MPC · JPL
477080	2009 BD_{89}	—	January 15, 2009	Kitt Peak	Spacewatch	·	1.7 km	MPC · JPL
477081	2009 BF_{90}	—	January 25, 2009	Kitt Peak	Spacewatch	·	1.9 km	MPC · JPL
477082	2009 BT_{91}	—	January 25, 2009	Kitt Peak	Spacewatch	·	1.1 km	MPC · JPL
477083	2009 BZ_{97}	—	January 26, 2009	Mount Lemmon	Mount Lemmon Survey	·	1.3 km	MPC · JPL
477084	2009 BO_{104}	—	January 25, 2009	Kitt Peak	Spacewatch	·	2.8 km	MPC · JPL
477085	2009 BB_{106}	—	January 25, 2009	Kitt Peak	Spacewatch	·	1.5 km	MPC · JPL
477086	2009 BE_{106}	—	December 31, 2008	Mount Lemmon	Mount Lemmon Survey	·	2.0 km	MPC · JPL
477087	2009 BS_{113}	—	January 26, 2009	Mount Lemmon	Mount Lemmon Survey	·	1.0 km	MPC · JPL
477088	2009 BX_{114}	—	January 26, 2009	Kitt Peak	Spacewatch	·	1.2 km	MPC · JPL
477089	2009 BR_{119}	—	January 17, 2009	Kitt Peak	Spacewatch	·	2.0 km	MPC · JPL
477090	2009 BN_{123}	—	January 21, 2009	Kitt Peak	Spacewatch	EOS	1.7 km	MPC · JPL
477091	2009 BH_{129}	—	January 30, 2009	Mount Lemmon	Mount Lemmon Survey	·	1.6 km	MPC · JPL
477092	2009 BX_{134}	—	January 15, 2009	Kitt Peak	Spacewatch	EOS	1.6 km	MPC · JPL
477093	2009 BW_{142}	—	January 30, 2009	Kitt Peak	Spacewatch	·	1.5 km	MPC · JPL
477094	2009 BN_{143}	—	January 30, 2009	Kitt Peak	Spacewatch	·	1.5 km	MPC · JPL
477095	2009 BS_{146}	—	November 23, 2008	Mount Lemmon	Mount Lemmon Survey	EOS	1.9 km	MPC · JPL
477096	2009 BE_{147}	—	January 30, 2009	Mount Lemmon	Mount Lemmon Survey	·	1.2 km	MPC · JPL
477097	2009 BU_{147}	—	January 30, 2009	Mount Lemmon	Mount Lemmon Survey	·	1.2 km	MPC · JPL
477098	2009 BW_{147}	—	January 30, 2009	Mount Lemmon	Mount Lemmon Survey	·	1.2 km	MPC · JPL
477099	2009 BJ_{148}	—	November 23, 2008	Mount Lemmon	Mount Lemmon Survey	·	2.9 km	MPC · JPL
477100	2009 BZ_{148}	—	January 31, 2009	Kitt Peak	Spacewatch	·	990 m	MPC · JPL

== 477101–477200 ==
back to top

Designation			Discovery			Properties		Ref
Permanent	Provisional	Named after	Date	Site	Discoverer(s)	Category	Diam.	Ref
477101	2009 BJ_{153}	—	January 31, 2009	Kitt Peak	Spacewatch	·	1.7 km	MPC · JPL
477102	2009 BP_{154}	—	January 31, 2009	Kitt Peak	Spacewatch	AGN	1.1 km	MPC · JPL
477103	2009 BL_{162}	—	January 30, 2009	Mount Lemmon	Mount Lemmon Survey	KOR	1.4 km	MPC · JPL
477104	2009 BY_{164}	—	January 31, 2009	Kitt Peak	Spacewatch	·	3.0 km	MPC · JPL
477105	2009 BL_{166}	—	January 31, 2009	Mount Lemmon	Mount Lemmon Survey	·	1.8 km	MPC · JPL
477106	2009 BX_{166}	—	December 30, 2008	Mount Lemmon	Mount Lemmon Survey	LIX	3.1 km	MPC · JPL
477107	2009 BD_{172}	—	January 18, 2009	Mount Lemmon	Mount Lemmon Survey	KOR	1.3 km	MPC · JPL
477108	2009 BA_{174}	—	January 25, 2009	Kitt Peak	Spacewatch	·	1.7 km	MPC · JPL
477109	2009 BN_{175}	—	January 29, 2009	Mount Lemmon	Mount Lemmon Survey	·	2.2 km	MPC · JPL
477110	2009 BQ_{177}	—	January 30, 2009	Mount Lemmon	Mount Lemmon Survey	·	2.0 km	MPC · JPL
477111	2009 BX_{177}	—	January 31, 2009	Mount Lemmon	Mount Lemmon Survey	·	2.7 km	MPC · JPL
477112	2009 BB_{178}	—	January 31, 2009	Kitt Peak	Spacewatch	·	1.1 km	MPC · JPL
477113	2009 BT_{181}	—	January 21, 2009	Catalina	CSS	·	3.1 km	MPC · JPL
477114	2009 BR_{183}	—	January 16, 2009	Socorro	LINEAR	fast	1.9 km	MPC · JPL
477115	2009 BX_{183}	—	January 20, 2009	Kitt Peak	Spacewatch	·	990 m	MPC · JPL
477116	2009 BE_{186}	—	January 17, 2009	Kitt Peak	Spacewatch	NAE	2.4 km	MPC · JPL
477117	2009 BR_{187}	—	January 31, 2009	Mount Lemmon	Mount Lemmon Survey	·	2.0 km	MPC · JPL
477118	2009 BQ_{189}	—	January 18, 2009	Kitt Peak	Spacewatch	·	1.5 km	MPC · JPL
477119	2009 CR_{28}	—	February 1, 2009	Kitt Peak	Spacewatch	HOF	2.4 km	MPC · JPL
477120	2009 CK_{31}	—	February 1, 2009	Kitt Peak	Spacewatch	AEO	1.1 km	MPC · JPL
477121	2009 CL_{31}	—	February 1, 2009	Kitt Peak	Spacewatch	·	2.2 km	MPC · JPL
477122	2009 CM_{33}	—	February 1, 2009	Kitt Peak	Spacewatch	·	1.7 km	MPC · JPL
477123	2009 CU_{36}	—	February 3, 2009	Kitt Peak	Spacewatch	·	2.1 km	MPC · JPL
477124	2009 CX_{37}	—	February 2, 2009	Catalina	CSS	·	1.2 km	MPC · JPL
477125	2009 CM_{44}	—	December 4, 2008	Mount Lemmon	Mount Lemmon Survey	·	1.7 km	MPC · JPL
477126	2009 CD_{48}	—	March 8, 2000	Kitt Peak	Spacewatch	·	2.0 km	MPC · JPL
477127	2009 CK_{48}	—	February 14, 2009	Kitt Peak	Spacewatch	EUN	1.2 km	MPC · JPL
477128	2009 CJ_{54}	—	February 14, 2009	Mount Lemmon	Mount Lemmon Survey	·	3.0 km	MPC · JPL
477129	2009 CZ_{54}	—	January 18, 2009	Kitt Peak	Spacewatch	·	970 m	MPC · JPL
477130	2009 CS_{57}	—	February 2, 2009	Kitt Peak	Spacewatch	·	2.0 km	MPC · JPL
477131	2009 CH_{59}	—	February 14, 2009	Kitt Peak	Spacewatch	·	1.6 km	MPC · JPL
477132	2009 DM	—	September 20, 2003	Kitt Peak	Spacewatch	(1547)	1.0 km	MPC · JPL
477133	2009 DY_{2}	—	February 17, 2009	Calar Alto	F. Hormuth	·	1.0 km	MPC · JPL
477134	2009 DU_{9}	—	February 13, 2009	Kitt Peak	Spacewatch	·	1.7 km	MPC · JPL
477135	2009 DM_{10}	—	February 21, 2009	Calar Alto	F. Hormuth	·	930 m	MPC · JPL
477136	2009 DL_{14}	—	February 19, 2009	Mount Lemmon	Mount Lemmon Survey	HOF	2.8 km	MPC · JPL
477137	2009 DR_{14}	—	February 19, 2009	Mount Lemmon	Mount Lemmon Survey	·	1.6 km	MPC · JPL
477138	2009 DE_{15}	—	January 23, 2009	XuYi	PMO NEO Survey Program	H	550 m	MPC · JPL
477139	2009 DT_{16}	—	January 20, 2009	Mount Lemmon	Mount Lemmon Survey	·	1.7 km	MPC · JPL
477140	2009 DA_{17}	—	February 19, 2009	La Sagra	OAM	·	2.1 km	MPC · JPL
477141	2009 DK_{33}	—	February 20, 2009	Kitt Peak	Spacewatch	·	3.9 km	MPC · JPL
477142	2009 DM_{36}	—	February 1, 2009	Kitt Peak	Spacewatch	H	450 m	MPC · JPL
477143	2009 DH_{37}	—	February 5, 2009	Kitt Peak	Spacewatch	·	1.2 km	MPC · JPL
477144	2009 DW_{39}	—	February 20, 2009	Dauban	Kugel, F.	(13314)	1.7 km	MPC · JPL
477145	2009 DQ_{41}	—	February 18, 2009	La Sagra	OAM	·	1.2 km	MPC · JPL
477146	2009 DJ_{52}	—	January 29, 2009	Mount Lemmon	Mount Lemmon Survey	·	2.2 km	MPC · JPL
477147	2009 DL_{58}	—	February 22, 2009	Kitt Peak	Spacewatch	·	2.0 km	MPC · JPL
477148	2009 DS_{64}	—	February 19, 2009	Catalina	CSS	·	1.9 km	MPC · JPL
477149	2009 DT_{76}	—	February 13, 2009	Kitt Peak	Spacewatch	·	2.2 km	MPC · JPL
477150	2009 DE_{79}	—	February 21, 2009	Kitt Peak	Spacewatch	·	1.5 km	MPC · JPL
477151	2009 DC_{84}	—	February 22, 2009	Kitt Peak	Spacewatch	·	1.5 km	MPC · JPL
477152	2009 DJ_{84}	—	February 26, 2009	Kitt Peak	Spacewatch	KOR	1.6 km	MPC · JPL
477153	2009 DS_{88}	—	February 22, 2009	Kitt Peak	Spacewatch	·	590 m	MPC · JPL
477154	2009 DA_{91}	—	February 26, 2009	Mount Lemmon	Mount Lemmon Survey	AEO	1.0 km	MPC · JPL
477155	2009 DQ_{106}	—	February 27, 2009	Kitt Peak	Spacewatch	·	4.4 km	MPC · JPL
477156	2009 DS_{130}	—	February 27, 2009	Mount Lemmon	Mount Lemmon Survey	·	3.0 km	MPC · JPL
477157	2009 DG_{132}	—	February 22, 2009	Kitt Peak	Spacewatch	·	1.5 km	MPC · JPL
477158	2009 DH_{132}	—	February 19, 2009	Kitt Peak	Spacewatch	·	2.0 km	MPC · JPL
477159	2009 DO_{133}	—	February 27, 2009	Kitt Peak	Spacewatch	·	2.0 km	MPC · JPL
477160	2009 DR_{133}	—	October 14, 2007	Mount Lemmon	Mount Lemmon Survey	·	2.0 km	MPC · JPL
477161	2009 DV_{138}	—	February 20, 2009	Kitt Peak	Spacewatch	·	2.1 km	MPC · JPL
477162	2009 ES	—	March 2, 2009	Mount Lemmon	Mount Lemmon Survey	APO · PHA	260 m	MPC · JPL
477163	2009 ED_{9}	—	February 3, 2009	Kitt Peak	Spacewatch	·	2.0 km	MPC · JPL
477164	2009 EW_{14}	—	February 2, 2009	Catalina	CSS	·	1.0 km	MPC · JPL
477165	2009 EY_{18}	—	January 30, 2009	Mount Lemmon	Mount Lemmon Survey	·	1.6 km	MPC · JPL
477166	2009 EX_{19}	—	March 15, 2009	Kitt Peak	Spacewatch	·	1.6 km	MPC · JPL
477167	2009 ED_{24}	—	March 1, 2009	Kitt Peak	Spacewatch	·	2.2 km	MPC · JPL
477168	2009 EM_{28}	—	March 2, 2009	Mount Lemmon	Mount Lemmon Survey	·	2.8 km	MPC · JPL
477169	2009 EF_{29}	—	October 10, 2007	Kitt Peak	Spacewatch	DOR	2.4 km	MPC · JPL
477170	2009 FL_{2}	—	March 17, 2009	Needville	J. Dellinger	·	1.5 km	MPC · JPL
477171	2009 FR_{9}	—	March 3, 2009	Mount Lemmon	Mount Lemmon Survey	·	1.6 km	MPC · JPL
477172	2009 FJ_{15}	—	February 2, 2009	Kitt Peak	Spacewatch	·	2.0 km	MPC · JPL
477173	2009 FR_{27}	—	March 21, 2009	Catalina	CSS	·	1.5 km	MPC · JPL
477174	2009 FD_{28}	—	March 26, 2004	Socorro	LINEAR	·	3.3 km	MPC · JPL
477175	2009 FZ_{31}	—	March 26, 2009	Cerro Burek	Burek, Cerro	·	3.9 km	MPC · JPL
477176	2009 FX_{34}	—	March 24, 2009	Mount Lemmon	Mount Lemmon Survey	·	2.1 km	MPC · JPL
477177	2009 FJ_{49}	—	March 27, 2009	Catalina	CSS	·	3.1 km	MPC · JPL
477178	2009 FW_{53}	—	March 17, 2009	Kitt Peak	Spacewatch	·	1.7 km	MPC · JPL
477179	2009 FN_{55}	—	March 31, 2009	Kitt Peak	Spacewatch	·	2.0 km	MPC · JPL
477180	2009 FE_{58}	—	March 21, 2009	Kitt Peak	Spacewatch	·	1.6 km	MPC · JPL
477181	2009 FT_{58}	—	September 17, 2006	Kitt Peak	Spacewatch	·	1.6 km	MPC · JPL
477182	2009 FR_{61}	—	March 16, 2009	Mount Lemmon	Mount Lemmon Survey	·	2.0 km	MPC · JPL
477183	2009 FH_{65}	—	March 2, 2009	Kitt Peak	Spacewatch	EOS	1.7 km	MPC · JPL
477184	2009 FB_{68}	—	March 17, 2009	Kitt Peak	Spacewatch	·	2.5 km	MPC · JPL
477185	2009 FJ_{69}	—	March 17, 2009	Kitt Peak	Spacewatch	·	3.3 km	MPC · JPL
477186	2009 FT_{69}	—	March 18, 2009	Kitt Peak	Spacewatch	·	570 m	MPC · JPL
477187	2009 FS_{73}	—	March 27, 2009	Mount Lemmon	Mount Lemmon Survey	·	1.8 km	MPC · JPL
477188	2009 FK_{78}	—	February 27, 2009	Catalina	CSS	·	2.4 km	MPC · JPL
477189	2009 GJ	—	April 1, 2009	Cerro Burek	Burek, Cerro	·	3.2 km	MPC · JPL
477190	2009 HR_{6}	—	April 17, 2009	Kitt Peak	Spacewatch	·	1.9 km	MPC · JPL
477191	2009 HS_{7}	—	April 17, 2009	Kitt Peak	Spacewatch	·	2.4 km	MPC · JPL
477192	2009 HH_{8}	—	March 27, 2009	Mount Lemmon	Mount Lemmon Survey	·	2.2 km	MPC · JPL
477193	2009 HR_{12}	—	April 19, 2009	Great Shefford	Birtwhistle, P.	·	2.7 km	MPC · JPL
477194	2009 HQ_{16}	—	March 21, 2009	Kitt Peak	Spacewatch	·	1.6 km	MPC · JPL
477195	2009 HS_{18}	—	April 19, 2009	Kitt Peak	Spacewatch	·	3.3 km	MPC · JPL
477196	2009 HD_{24}	—	April 17, 2009	Kitt Peak	Spacewatch	·	2.6 km	MPC · JPL
477197	2009 HA_{32}	—	April 2, 2009	Kitt Peak	Spacewatch	·	2.1 km	MPC · JPL
477198	2009 HW_{35}	—	April 20, 2009	Kitt Peak	Spacewatch	·	2.5 km	MPC · JPL
477199	2009 HT_{46}	—	March 21, 2009	Kitt Peak	Spacewatch	·	2.0 km	MPC · JPL
477200	2009 HU_{64}	—	April 23, 2009	Kitt Peak	Spacewatch	·	2.7 km	MPC · JPL

== 477201–477300 ==
back to top

Designation			Discovery			Properties		Ref
Permanent	Provisional	Named after	Date	Site	Discoverer(s)	Category	Diam.	Ref
477201	2009 HH_{67}	—	April 26, 2009	Mount Lemmon	Mount Lemmon Survey	·	2.8 km	MPC · JPL
477202	2009 HX_{70}	—	April 22, 2009	Mount Lemmon	Mount Lemmon Survey	·	2.8 km	MPC · JPL
477203	2009 HQ_{71}	—	April 22, 2009	Mount Lemmon	Mount Lemmon Survey	·	2.8 km	MPC · JPL
477204	2009 HG_{85}	—	April 28, 2009	Catalina	CSS	·	2.3 km	MPC · JPL
477205	2009 HE_{86}	—	April 21, 2009	Mount Lemmon	Mount Lemmon Survey	·	1.8 km	MPC · JPL
477206	2009 HR_{97}	—	April 18, 2009	Kitt Peak	Spacewatch	·	3.5 km	MPC · JPL
477207	2009 HN_{98}	—	April 22, 2009	Mount Lemmon	Mount Lemmon Survey	·	2.2 km	MPC · JPL
477208	2009 HK_{105}	—	April 23, 2009	Kitt Peak	Spacewatch	·	2.6 km	MPC · JPL
477209	2009 JN	—	April 27, 2009	Mount Lemmon	Mount Lemmon Survey	·	660 m	MPC · JPL
477210	2009 JL_{7}	—	May 13, 2009	Kitt Peak	Spacewatch	·	2.8 km	MPC · JPL
477211	2009 JN_{8}	—	May 13, 2009	Kitt Peak	Spacewatch	·	4.3 km	MPC · JPL
477212	2009 JJ_{16}	—	May 13, 2009	Kitt Peak	Spacewatch	·	3.4 km	MPC · JPL
477213	2009 JT_{16}	—	May 13, 2009	Kitt Peak	Spacewatch	·	2.9 km	MPC · JPL
477214	2009 JF_{18}	—	May 1, 2009	Mount Lemmon	Mount Lemmon Survey	·	3.6 km	MPC · JPL
477215	2009 KY_{6}	—	April 20, 2009	Kitt Peak	Spacewatch	(8737)	2.8 km	MPC · JPL
477216	2009 KL_{9}	—	May 24, 2009	Kitt Peak	Spacewatch	·	610 m	MPC · JPL
477217	2009 KG_{14}	—	April 23, 2009	Kitt Peak	Spacewatch	·	2.3 km	MPC · JPL
477218	2009 KG_{16}	—	May 15, 2009	Kitt Peak	Spacewatch	·	2.0 km	MPC · JPL
477219	2009 KC_{17}	—	April 30, 2009	Kitt Peak	Spacewatch	·	630 m	MPC · JPL
477220	2009 LK	—	September 13, 2004	Kitt Peak	Spacewatch	·	5.1 km	MPC · JPL
477221	2009 LY	—	June 14, 2009	Catalina	CSS	T_{j} (2.96)	5.2 km	MPC · JPL
477222	2009 PL_{11}	—	August 15, 2009	Kitt Peak	Spacewatch	NYS	1.1 km	MPC · JPL
477223	2009 PS_{11}	—	August 15, 2009	Kitt Peak	Spacewatch	·	650 m	MPC · JPL
477224	2009 PK_{15}	—	August 15, 2009	Catalina	CSS	·	760 m	MPC · JPL
477225	2009 PY_{15}	—	March 10, 2008	Kitt Peak	Spacewatch	V	550 m	MPC · JPL
477226	2009 PB_{21}	—	August 15, 2009	Kitt Peak	Spacewatch	·	530 m	MPC · JPL
477227	2009 QB_{12}	—	August 16, 2009	Kitt Peak	Spacewatch	·	620 m	MPC · JPL
477228	2009 QG_{42}	—	August 26, 2009	La Sagra	OAM	·	750 m	MPC · JPL
477229	2009 RX_{3}	—	August 20, 2009	Kitt Peak	Spacewatch	·	720 m	MPC · JPL
477230	2009 RW_{6}	—	September 10, 2009	Catalina	CSS	fast	700 m	MPC · JPL
477231	2009 RH_{9}	—	September 12, 2009	Kitt Peak	Spacewatch	·	700 m	MPC · JPL
477232	2009 RG_{12}	—	September 12, 2009	Kitt Peak	Spacewatch	·	800 m	MPC · JPL
477233	2009 RT_{14}	—	September 12, 2009	Kitt Peak	Spacewatch	·	1.2 km	MPC · JPL
477234	2009 RD_{16}	—	September 12, 2009	Kitt Peak	Spacewatch	·	540 m	MPC · JPL
477235	2009 RA_{20}	—	September 14, 2009	Catalina	CSS	PHO	580 m	MPC · JPL
477236	2009 RU_{30}	—	September 14, 2009	Kitt Peak	Spacewatch	PHO	990 m	MPC · JPL
477237	2009 RQ_{31}	—	September 14, 2009	Kitt Peak	Spacewatch	·	820 m	MPC · JPL
477238	2009 RC_{34}	—	September 14, 2009	Kitt Peak	Spacewatch	·	770 m	MPC · JPL
477239	2009 RJ_{35}	—	September 14, 2009	Kitt Peak	Spacewatch	PHO	960 m	MPC · JPL
477240	2009 RW_{42}	—	September 15, 2009	Kitt Peak	Spacewatch	·	640 m	MPC · JPL
477241	2009 RW_{46}	—	September 15, 2009	Kitt Peak	Spacewatch	·	660 m	MPC · JPL
477242	2009 RD_{48}	—	September 15, 2009	Kitt Peak	Spacewatch	·	820 m	MPC · JPL
477243	2009 RS_{48}	—	September 15, 2009	Kitt Peak	Spacewatch	·	590 m	MPC · JPL
477244	2009 RK_{54}	—	September 15, 2009	Kitt Peak	Spacewatch	·	670 m	MPC · JPL
477245	2009 RF_{65}	—	September 15, 2009	Kitt Peak	Spacewatch	·	830 m	MPC · JPL
477246	2009 RL_{70}	—	September 12, 2009	Kitt Peak	Spacewatch	·	620 m	MPC · JPL
477247	2009 RS_{70}	—	September 12, 2009	Kitt Peak	Spacewatch	·	620 m	MPC · JPL
477248	2009 SV	—	September 17, 2009	Mount Lemmon	Mount Lemmon Survey	AMO	350 m	MPC · JPL
477249	2009 SM_{11}	—	September 16, 2009	Mount Lemmon	Mount Lemmon Survey	·	2.4 km	MPC · JPL
477250	2009 SS_{11}	—	September 16, 2009	Kitt Peak	Spacewatch	·	700 m	MPC · JPL
477251	2009 SR_{27}	—	September 16, 2009	Kitt Peak	Spacewatch	·	1.0 km	MPC · JPL
477252	2009 SM_{30}	—	September 16, 2009	Kitt Peak	Spacewatch	·	740 m	MPC · JPL
477253	2009 SV_{36}	—	September 16, 2009	Kitt Peak	Spacewatch	·	890 m	MPC · JPL
477254	2009 SS_{48}	—	February 25, 2007	Kitt Peak	Spacewatch	·	810 m	MPC · JPL
477255	2009 SX_{58}	—	September 17, 2009	Kitt Peak	Spacewatch	V	570 m	MPC · JPL
477256	2009 SB_{61}	—	September 17, 2009	Kitt Peak	Spacewatch	·	880 m	MPC · JPL
477257	2009 SM_{61}	—	September 17, 2009	Kitt Peak	Spacewatch	PHO	1.2 km	MPC · JPL
477258	2009 SB_{65}	—	August 27, 2009	Kitt Peak	Spacewatch	·	730 m	MPC · JPL
477259	2009 SV_{65}	—	September 17, 2009	Kitt Peak	Spacewatch	·	630 m	MPC · JPL
477260	2009 SH_{74}	—	September 17, 2009	Kitt Peak	Spacewatch	·	700 m	MPC · JPL
477261	2009 SO_{74}	—	September 17, 2009	Kitt Peak	Spacewatch	·	1.1 km	MPC · JPL
477262	2009 SA_{76}	—	September 17, 2009	Kitt Peak	Spacewatch	·	650 m	MPC · JPL
477263	2009 SH_{77}	—	September 17, 2009	Kitt Peak	Spacewatch	·	970 m	MPC · JPL
477264	2009 SA_{79}	—	September 18, 2009	Kitt Peak	Spacewatch	·	1.1 km	MPC · JPL
477265	2009 SW_{90}	—	September 18, 2009	Mount Lemmon	Mount Lemmon Survey	·	610 m	MPC · JPL
477266	2009 SR_{92}	—	September 18, 2009	Mount Lemmon	Mount Lemmon Survey	·	830 m	MPC · JPL
477267	2009 SR_{100}	—	September 18, 2009	Kitt Peak	Spacewatch	NYS	1.2 km	MPC · JPL
477268	2009 SG_{102}	—	September 24, 2009	Dauban	Kugel, F.	·	600 m	MPC · JPL
477269	2009 SH_{102}	—	September 24, 2009	Dauban	Kugel, F.	·	690 m	MPC · JPL
477270	2009 SF_{107}	—	September 16, 2009	Kitt Peak	Spacewatch	·	1.2 km	MPC · JPL
477271	2009 SR_{109}	—	September 17, 2009	Kitt Peak	Spacewatch	·	980 m	MPC · JPL
477272	2009 SJ_{110}	—	September 17, 2009	Kitt Peak	Spacewatch	·	1.6 km	MPC · JPL
477273	2009 SN_{112}	—	September 18, 2009	Kitt Peak	Spacewatch	·	790 m	MPC · JPL
477274	2009 SO_{117}	—	September 18, 2009	Kitt Peak	Spacewatch	·	910 m	MPC · JPL
477275	2009 SF_{121}	—	September 18, 2009	Kitt Peak	Spacewatch	·	1.0 km	MPC · JPL
477276	2009 SN_{124}	—	September 18, 2009	Kitt Peak	Spacewatch	(2076)	790 m	MPC · JPL
477277	2009 SC_{130}	—	September 18, 2009	Kitt Peak	Spacewatch	·	1.2 km	MPC · JPL
477278	2009 SF_{130}	—	September 18, 2009	Kitt Peak	Spacewatch	·	750 m	MPC · JPL
477279	2009 SO_{131}	—	September 18, 2009	Kitt Peak	Spacewatch	·	890 m	MPC · JPL
477280	2009 SY_{133}	—	September 18, 2009	Kitt Peak	Spacewatch	·	580 m	MPC · JPL
477281	2009 SK_{135}	—	September 18, 2009	Kitt Peak	Spacewatch	·	650 m	MPC · JPL
477282	2009 SX_{140}	—	September 19, 2009	Kitt Peak	Spacewatch	·	730 m	MPC · JPL
477283	2009 SV_{144}	—	August 18, 2009	Kitt Peak	Spacewatch	·	1.1 km	MPC · JPL
477284	2009 SW_{151}	—	January 27, 2007	Mount Lemmon	Mount Lemmon Survey	·	690 m	MPC · JPL
477285	2009 SZ_{151}	—	September 12, 2009	Kitt Peak	Spacewatch	·	750 m	MPC · JPL
477286	2009 SL_{156}	—	September 20, 2009	Kitt Peak	Spacewatch	·	810 m	MPC · JPL
477287	2009 SA_{157}	—	September 20, 2009	Kitt Peak	Spacewatch	·	580 m	MPC · JPL
477288	2009 ST_{157}	—	September 20, 2009	Kitt Peak	Spacewatch	·	1.2 km	MPC · JPL
477289	2009 SD_{170}	—	September 25, 2009	LightBuckets	LightBuckets	·	1.1 km	MPC · JPL
477290	2009 SS_{170}	—	September 23, 2009	Mount Lemmon	Mount Lemmon Survey	NYS	1.3 km	MPC · JPL
477291	2009 SG_{171}	—	September 27, 2009	Great Shefford	Birtwhistle, P.	·	580 m	MPC · JPL
477292	2009 SD_{185}	—	September 21, 2009	Kitt Peak	Spacewatch	V	610 m	MPC · JPL
477293	2009 SM_{187}	—	September 21, 2009	Kitt Peak	Spacewatch	NYS	790 m	MPC · JPL
477294	2009 SV_{187}	—	September 21, 2009	Kitt Peak	Spacewatch	·	1.0 km	MPC · JPL
477295	2009 SD_{192}	—	September 18, 2009	Kitt Peak	Spacewatch	(2076)	840 m	MPC · JPL
477296	2009 SD_{199}	—	September 22, 2009	Kitt Peak	Spacewatch	·	930 m	MPC · JPL
477297	2009 SR_{202}	—	September 22, 2009	Kitt Peak	Spacewatch	·	540 m	MPC · JPL
477298	2009 SY_{203}	—	September 22, 2009	Kitt Peak	Spacewatch	NYS	790 m	MPC · JPL
477299	2009 SA_{204}	—	March 8, 2008	Mount Lemmon	Mount Lemmon Survey	NYS	910 m	MPC · JPL
477300	2009 SG_{204}	—	September 22, 2009	Kitt Peak	Spacewatch	·	520 m	MPC · JPL

== 477301–477400 ==
back to top

Designation			Discovery			Properties		Ref
Permanent	Provisional	Named after	Date	Site	Discoverer(s)	Category	Diam.	Ref
477301	2009 SC_{205}	—	September 22, 2009	Kitt Peak	Spacewatch	(2076)	670 m	MPC · JPL
477302	2009 ST_{209}	—	September 23, 2009	Kitt Peak	Spacewatch	·	640 m	MPC · JPL
477303	2009 SY_{222}	—	September 16, 2009	Kitt Peak	Spacewatch	·	1.1 km	MPC · JPL
477304	2009 SM_{225}	—	September 16, 2009	Kitt Peak	Spacewatch	·	1.2 km	MPC · JPL
477305	2009 SJ_{253}	—	September 23, 2009	Kitt Peak	Spacewatch	·	700 m	MPC · JPL
477306	2009 SD_{257}	—	April 12, 2005	Kitt Peak	Spacewatch	·	640 m	MPC · JPL
477307	2009 SS_{275}	—	September 25, 2009	Kitt Peak	Spacewatch	·	620 m	MPC · JPL
477308	2009 SZ_{287}	—	December 15, 2006	Kitt Peak	Spacewatch	·	650 m	MPC · JPL
477309	2009 SB_{289}	—	September 25, 2009	Kitt Peak	Spacewatch	NYS	620 m	MPC · JPL
477310	2009 SZ_{294}	—	January 27, 2007	Kitt Peak	Spacewatch	MAS	510 m	MPC · JPL
477311	2009 SR_{302}	—	September 16, 2009	Kitt Peak	Spacewatch	·	830 m	MPC · JPL
477312	2009 SW_{306}	—	September 17, 2009	Kitt Peak	Spacewatch	·	790 m	MPC · JPL
477313	2009 SG_{313}	—	January 25, 2007	Kitt Peak	Spacewatch	·	460 m	MPC · JPL
477314	2009 SX_{327}	—	September 26, 2009	Kitt Peak	Spacewatch	·	900 m	MPC · JPL
477315	2009 SO_{333}	—	September 25, 2009	Mount Lemmon	Mount Lemmon Survey	·	720 m	MPC · JPL
477316	2009 SE_{342}	—	September 16, 2009	Kitt Peak	Spacewatch	·	740 m	MPC · JPL
477317	2009 SO_{342}	—	September 16, 2009	Mount Lemmon	Mount Lemmon Survey	·	620 m	MPC · JPL
477318	2009 SR_{345}	—	September 19, 2009	Catalina	CSS	·	660 m	MPC · JPL
477319	2009 SQ_{347}	—	September 28, 2009	Mount Lemmon	Mount Lemmon Survey	·	590 m	MPC · JPL
477320	2009 SV_{349}	—	September 19, 2009	Kitt Peak	Spacewatch	·	890 m	MPC · JPL
477321	2009 SZ_{349}	—	September 20, 2009	Kitt Peak	Spacewatch	·	1.9 km	MPC · JPL
477322	2009 SV_{357}	—	September 28, 2009	Kitt Peak	Spacewatch	·	590 m	MPC · JPL
477323	2009 TE_{1}	—	October 2, 2009	Mount Lemmon	Mount Lemmon Survey	·	1.7 km	MPC · JPL
477324	2009 TF_{2}	—	September 19, 2009	Kitt Peak	Spacewatch	·	870 m	MPC · JPL
477325	2009 TK_{2}	—	September 28, 2009	Kitt Peak	Spacewatch	·	720 m	MPC · JPL
477326	2009 TQ_{7}	—	October 13, 2009	La Sagra	OAM	·	790 m	MPC · JPL
477327	2009 TB_{8}	—	October 14, 2009	Mount Lemmon	Mount Lemmon Survey	APO	770 m	MPC · JPL
477328	2009 TR_{19}	—	October 11, 2009	Mount Lemmon	Mount Lemmon Survey	·	840 m	MPC · JPL
477329	2009 TG_{21}	—	October 11, 2009	La Sagra	OAM	·	750 m	MPC · JPL
477330	2009 TV_{21}	—	September 28, 2009	Kitt Peak	Spacewatch	·	470 m	MPC · JPL
477331	2009 TW_{22}	—	August 29, 2009	Kitt Peak	Spacewatch	NYS	860 m	MPC · JPL
477332	2009 TE_{29}	—	September 25, 2009	Kitt Peak	Spacewatch	·	650 m	MPC · JPL
477333	2009 TA_{33}	—	October 15, 2009	Mount Lemmon	Mount Lemmon Survey	·	720 m	MPC · JPL
477334	2009 TE_{33}	—	October 15, 2009	Mount Lemmon	Mount Lemmon Survey	·	870 m	MPC · JPL
477335	2009 TV_{42}	—	October 14, 2009	Mount Lemmon	Mount Lemmon Survey	·	510 m	MPC · JPL
477336	2009 TY_{43}	—	October 14, 2009	Mount Lemmon	Mount Lemmon Survey	·	1.5 km	MPC · JPL
477337	2009 TU_{46}	—	December 31, 2002	Kitt Peak	Spacewatch	·	1.1 km	MPC · JPL
477338	2009 UE_{3}	—	October 18, 2009	Taunus	Karge, S., R. Kling	·	1.5 km	MPC · JPL
477339	2009 UZ_{11}	—	September 19, 2009	Mount Lemmon	Mount Lemmon Survey	·	820 m	MPC · JPL
477340	2009 UB_{13}	—	October 17, 2009	Catalina	CSS	·	790 m	MPC · JPL
477341	2009 UJ_{16}	—	September 14, 2009	Catalina	CSS	·	770 m	MPC · JPL
477342	2009 UK_{19}	—	October 23, 2009	Mayhill	Lowe, A.	·	830 m	MPC · JPL
477343	2009 UD_{27}	—	October 21, 2009	Catalina	CSS	V	560 m	MPC · JPL
477344	2009 UB_{33}	—	October 18, 2009	Mount Lemmon	Mount Lemmon Survey	MAS	560 m	MPC · JPL
477345	2009 UC_{34}	—	October 18, 2009	Mount Lemmon	Mount Lemmon Survey	·	990 m	MPC · JPL
477346	2009 UW_{36}	—	October 22, 2009	Mount Lemmon	Mount Lemmon Survey	V	660 m	MPC · JPL
477347	2009 UQ_{37}	—	October 22, 2009	Mount Lemmon	Mount Lemmon Survey	·	830 m	MPC · JPL
477348	2009 UG_{39}	—	October 22, 2009	Mount Lemmon	Mount Lemmon Survey	·	910 m	MPC · JPL
477349	2009 UV_{39}	—	October 22, 2009	Mount Lemmon	Mount Lemmon Survey	·	710 m	MPC · JPL
477350	2009 UE_{52}	—	January 17, 2007	Kitt Peak	Spacewatch	·	880 m	MPC · JPL
477351	2009 UF_{63}	—	November 27, 2006	Mount Lemmon	Mount Lemmon Survey	·	660 m	MPC · JPL
477352	2009 UM_{68}	—	October 18, 2009	La Cañada	Lacruz, J.	·	1.2 km	MPC · JPL
477353	2009 UR_{68}	—	October 18, 2009	Mount Lemmon	Mount Lemmon Survey	V	590 m	MPC · JPL
477354	2009 UR_{76}	—	September 18, 2009	Kitt Peak	Spacewatch	·	870 m	MPC · JPL
477355	2009 UX_{79}	—	October 22, 2009	Mount Lemmon	Mount Lemmon Survey	·	900 m	MPC · JPL
477356	2009 UM_{85}	—	March 12, 2007	Mount Lemmon	Mount Lemmon Survey	MAS	600 m	MPC · JPL
477357	2009 UL_{87}	—	October 24, 2009	Catalina	CSS	·	900 m	MPC · JPL
477358	2009 UB_{88}	—	October 23, 2009	Marly	P. Kocher	·	1 km	MPC · JPL
477359	2009 UV_{91}	—	October 18, 2009	La Sagra	OAM	·	1.4 km	MPC · JPL
477360	2009 UG_{93}	—	February 6, 2007	Kitt Peak	Spacewatch	·	760 m	MPC · JPL
477361	2009 US_{93}	—	October 26, 2009	Bisei SG Center	BATTeRS	NYS	810 m	MPC · JPL
477362	2009 UT_{98}	—	October 23, 2009	Mount Lemmon	Mount Lemmon Survey	·	980 m	MPC · JPL
477363	2009 UU_{100}	—	October 23, 2009	Mount Lemmon	Mount Lemmon Survey	NYS	770 m	MPC · JPL
477364	2009 UT_{101}	—	October 23, 2009	Mount Lemmon	Mount Lemmon Survey	·	900 m	MPC · JPL
477365	2009 UT_{104}	—	October 25, 2009	Mount Lemmon	Mount Lemmon Survey	·	740 m	MPC · JPL
477366	2009 UQ_{106}	—	October 9, 2002	Socorro	LINEAR	·	750 m	MPC · JPL
477367	2009 UM_{107}	—	October 22, 2009	Mount Lemmon	Mount Lemmon Survey	·	1.0 km	MPC · JPL
477368	2009 UZ_{107}	—	October 23, 2009	Kitt Peak	Spacewatch	·	760 m	MPC · JPL
477369	2009 UP_{113}	—	September 20, 2009	Kitt Peak	Spacewatch	·	910 m	MPC · JPL
477370	2009 UM_{115}	—	October 21, 2009	Mount Lemmon	Mount Lemmon Survey	·	1.1 km	MPC · JPL
477371	2009 UO_{118}	—	March 27, 2008	Mount Lemmon	Mount Lemmon Survey	MAS	550 m	MPC · JPL
477372	2009 UB_{127}	—	September 21, 2009	Mount Lemmon	Mount Lemmon Survey	(2076)	820 m	MPC · JPL
477373	2009 UO_{131}	—	October 26, 2009	Catalina	CSS	·	880 m	MPC · JPL
477374	2009 UZ_{132}	—	October 22, 2009	Catalina	CSS	·	1.1 km	MPC · JPL
477375	2009 UE_{137}	—	October 16, 1977	Palomar	C. J. van Houten, I. van Houten-Groeneveld, T. Gehrels	·	890 m	MPC · JPL
477376	2009 UO_{141}	—	October 16, 2009	Mount Lemmon	Mount Lemmon Survey	·	1.2 km	MPC · JPL
477377	2009 UO_{149}	—	October 26, 2009	Kitt Peak	Spacewatch	MAS	460 m	MPC · JPL
477378	2009 UP_{149}	—	October 26, 2009	Kitt Peak	Spacewatch	·	900 m	MPC · JPL
477379	2009 VO	—	October 1, 2009	Mount Lemmon	Mount Lemmon Survey	PHO	840 m	MPC · JPL
477380	2009 VF_{4}	—	September 21, 2009	Mount Lemmon	Mount Lemmon Survey	NYS	890 m	MPC · JPL
477381	2009 VG_{12}	—	October 18, 2009	Mount Lemmon	Mount Lemmon Survey	·	1.4 km	MPC · JPL
477382	2009 VR_{18}	—	November 9, 2009	Kitt Peak	Spacewatch	·	720 m	MPC · JPL
477383	2009 VJ_{19}	—	November 9, 2009	Kitt Peak	Spacewatch	·	950 m	MPC · JPL
477384	2009 VY_{22}	—	November 9, 2009	Mount Lemmon	Mount Lemmon Survey	·	910 m	MPC · JPL
477385	2009 VH_{24}	—	November 10, 2009	Nogales	Robbins, I.	·	780 m	MPC · JPL
477386	2009 VU_{25}	—	October 26, 2009	Kitt Peak	Spacewatch	·	510 m	MPC · JPL
477387	2009 VV_{26}	—	November 8, 2009	Kitt Peak	Spacewatch	·	1.1 km	MPC · JPL
477388	2009 VB_{28}	—	September 21, 2009	Mount Lemmon	Mount Lemmon Survey	·	1.5 km	MPC · JPL
477389	2009 VV_{28}	—	October 23, 2009	Kitt Peak	Spacewatch	·	1.1 km	MPC · JPL
477390	2009 VQ_{32}	—	November 9, 2009	Mount Lemmon	Mount Lemmon Survey	·	830 m	MPC · JPL
477391	2009 VO_{37}	—	November 8, 2009	Catalina	CSS	NYS	830 m	MPC · JPL
477392	2009 VO_{38}	—	November 9, 2009	Kitt Peak	Spacewatch	MAS	540 m	MPC · JPL
477393	2009 VH_{43}	—	November 10, 2009	Kitt Peak	Spacewatch	MAS	660 m	MPC · JPL
477394	2009 VG_{45}	—	November 11, 2009	Socorro	LINEAR	·	1.1 km	MPC · JPL
477395	2009 VA_{46}	—	November 9, 2009	Kitt Peak	Spacewatch	·	540 m	MPC · JPL
477396	2009 VA_{49}	—	November 11, 2009	Kitt Peak	Spacewatch	·	770 m	MPC · JPL
477397	2009 VF_{51}	—	November 15, 2009	Catalina	CSS	·	1.1 km	MPC · JPL
477398	2009 VZ_{54}	—	September 29, 2005	Mount Lemmon	Mount Lemmon Survey	·	1.1 km	MPC · JPL
477399	2009 VL_{57}	—	November 12, 2009	La Sagra	OAM	·	1.3 km	MPC · JPL
477400	2009 VN_{58}	—	November 15, 2009	Catalina	CSS	·	810 m	MPC · JPL

== 477401–477500 ==
back to top

Designation			Discovery			Properties		Ref
Permanent	Provisional	Named after	Date	Site	Discoverer(s)	Category	Diam.	Ref
477401	2009 VC_{59}	—	November 8, 2009	Catalina	CSS	·	660 m	MPC · JPL
477402	2009 VM_{59}	—	November 9, 2009	Catalina	CSS	·	820 m	MPC · JPL
477403	2009 VQ_{59}	—	November 9, 2009	Catalina	CSS	·	1.0 km	MPC · JPL
477404	2009 VS_{61}	—	October 27, 2009	Kitt Peak	Spacewatch	·	620 m	MPC · JPL
477405	2009 VM_{67}	—	October 22, 2009	Mount Lemmon	Mount Lemmon Survey	·	1.1 km	MPC · JPL
477406	2009 VQ_{68}	—	November 9, 2009	Kitt Peak	Spacewatch	·	810 m	MPC · JPL
477407	2009 VF_{70}	—	November 9, 2009	Mount Lemmon	Mount Lemmon Survey	NYS	1.0 km	MPC · JPL
477408	2009 VZ_{79}	—	November 10, 2009	Catalina	CSS	·	1.1 km	MPC · JPL
477409	2009 VQ_{84}	—	November 9, 2009	Kitt Peak	Spacewatch	NYS	960 m	MPC · JPL
477410	2009 VG_{86}	—	November 10, 2009	Kitt Peak	Spacewatch	·	1.0 km	MPC · JPL
477411	2009 VQ_{93}	—	September 18, 2009	Mount Lemmon	Mount Lemmon Survey	·	770 m	MPC · JPL
477412	2009 VO_{97}	—	November 9, 2009	Kitt Peak	Spacewatch	·	1.8 km	MPC · JPL
477413	2009 VO_{98}	—	October 5, 2005	Kitt Peak	Spacewatch	·	930 m	MPC · JPL
477414	2009 VV_{108}	—	October 14, 2009	Mount Lemmon	Mount Lemmon Survey	·	890 m	MPC · JPL
477415	2009 VK_{116}	—	November 11, 2009	Mount Lemmon	Mount Lemmon Survey	NYS	860 m	MPC · JPL
477416	2009 WW_{1}	—	December 23, 2006	Mount Lemmon	Mount Lemmon Survey	MAS	750 m	MPC · JPL
477417	2009 WF_{15}	—	November 16, 2009	Mount Lemmon	Mount Lemmon Survey	·	1.2 km	MPC · JPL
477418	2009 WE_{35}	—	November 16, 2009	La Sagra	OAM	·	1.0 km	MPC · JPL
477419	2009 WB_{37}	—	November 17, 2009	Kitt Peak	Spacewatch	NYS	810 m	MPC · JPL
477420	2009 WV_{38}	—	September 30, 2009	Mount Lemmon	Mount Lemmon Survey	V	650 m	MPC · JPL
477421	2009 WY_{45}	—	November 18, 2009	Kitt Peak	Spacewatch	·	1.2 km	MPC · JPL
477422	2009 WA_{49}	—	November 19, 2009	Kitt Peak	Spacewatch	·	730 m	MPC · JPL
477423	2009 WK_{50}	—	February 17, 2007	Kitt Peak	Spacewatch	·	1.6 km	MPC · JPL
477424	2009 WX_{56}	—	March 15, 2007	Mount Lemmon	Mount Lemmon Survey	·	560 m	MPC · JPL
477425	2009 WB_{79}	—	November 18, 2009	Mount Lemmon	Mount Lemmon Survey	·	690 m	MPC · JPL
477426	2009 WE_{80}	—	November 18, 2009	Kitt Peak	Spacewatch	·	1.1 km	MPC · JPL
477427	2009 WL_{81}	—	September 29, 2005	Mount Lemmon	Mount Lemmon Survey	NYS	1.0 km	MPC · JPL
477428	2009 WX_{84}	—	November 19, 2009	Kitt Peak	Spacewatch	·	1.0 km	MPC · JPL
477429	2009 WW_{96}	—	November 20, 2009	Mount Lemmon	Mount Lemmon Survey	NYS	910 m	MPC · JPL
477430	2009 WF_{120}	—	November 20, 2009	Kitt Peak	Spacewatch	MAS	600 m	MPC · JPL
477431	2009 WH_{123}	—	September 20, 2009	Mount Lemmon	Mount Lemmon Survey	3:2	4.3 km	MPC · JPL
477432	2009 WO_{125}	—	November 8, 2009	Kitt Peak	Spacewatch	·	1.2 km	MPC · JPL
477433	2009 WS_{133}	—	October 26, 2009	Kitt Peak	Spacewatch	·	840 m	MPC · JPL
477434	2009 WJ_{136}	—	November 23, 2009	Catalina	CSS	·	880 m	MPC · JPL
477435	2009 WU_{155}	—	November 20, 2009	Kitt Peak	Spacewatch	·	730 m	MPC · JPL
477436	2009 WL_{159}	—	October 12, 2009	Mount Lemmon	Mount Lemmon Survey	·	940 m	MPC · JPL
477437	2009 WM_{159}	—	September 15, 2009	Kitt Peak	Spacewatch	·	1.0 km	MPC · JPL
477438	2009 WS_{160}	—	September 1, 2005	Kitt Peak	Spacewatch	·	1.9 km	MPC · JPL
477439	2009 WK_{161}	—	November 21, 2009	Kitt Peak	Spacewatch	·	1.0 km	MPC · JPL
477440	2009 WV_{166}	—	November 21, 2009	Kitt Peak	Spacewatch	·	2.2 km	MPC · JPL
477441	2009 WP_{168}	—	November 22, 2009	Kitt Peak	Spacewatch	MAS	640 m	MPC · JPL
477442	2009 WM_{170}	—	November 22, 2009	Kitt Peak	Spacewatch	·	1.1 km	MPC · JPL
477443	2009 WM_{171}	—	July 9, 2005	Kitt Peak	Spacewatch	·	730 m	MPC · JPL
477444	2009 WT_{173}	—	October 26, 2009	Kitt Peak	Spacewatch	·	810 m	MPC · JPL
477445	2009 WM_{177}	—	November 11, 2009	Kitt Peak	Spacewatch	·	1.3 km	MPC · JPL
477446	2009 WP_{180}	—	November 10, 2009	Kitt Peak	Spacewatch	3:2	4.8 km	MPC · JPL
477447	2009 WQ_{185}	—	October 24, 2009	Kitt Peak	Spacewatch	V	520 m	MPC · JPL
477448	2009 WJ_{196}	—	November 25, 2009	Mount Lemmon	Mount Lemmon Survey	·	1.1 km	MPC · JPL
477449	2009 WW_{202}	—	October 21, 2009	Mount Lemmon	Mount Lemmon Survey	3:2	3.9 km	MPC · JPL
477450	2009 WS_{203}	—	August 17, 2009	Kitt Peak	Spacewatch	NYS	960 m	MPC · JPL
477451	2009 WL_{207}	—	November 9, 2009	Mount Lemmon	Mount Lemmon Survey	·	920 m	MPC · JPL
477452	2009 WM_{214}	—	November 20, 2009	Kitt Peak	Spacewatch	MAS	550 m	MPC · JPL
477453	2009 WK_{217}	—	November 18, 2009	La Silla	La Silla	·	1.2 km	MPC · JPL
477454	2009 WB_{226}	—	November 17, 2009	Mount Lemmon	Mount Lemmon Survey	3:2 · SHU	4.6 km	MPC · JPL
477455	2009 WC_{230}	—	November 17, 2009	Mount Lemmon	Mount Lemmon Survey	MAS	620 m	MPC · JPL
477456	2009 WH_{240}	—	November 17, 2009	Mount Lemmon	Mount Lemmon Survey	·	980 m	MPC · JPL
477457	2009 WO_{240}	—	September 19, 2009	Mount Lemmon	Mount Lemmon Survey	NYS	790 m	MPC · JPL
477458	2009 WR_{243}	—	November 19, 2009	Kitt Peak	Spacewatch	·	700 m	MPC · JPL
477459	2009 WO_{249}	—	November 17, 2009	Catalina	CSS	·	1.2 km	MPC · JPL
477460	2009 WU_{251}	—	November 27, 2009	Mount Lemmon	Mount Lemmon Survey	T_{j} (2.98) · 3:2	6.3 km	MPC · JPL
477461	2009 WP_{255}	—	September 22, 2009	Mount Lemmon	Mount Lemmon Survey	3:2	4.7 km	MPC · JPL
477462	2009 WH_{261}	—	November 17, 2009	Mount Lemmon	Mount Lemmon Survey	T_{j} (2.98) · 3:2	4.1 km	MPC · JPL
477463	2009 WK_{263}	—	November 19, 2009	Mount Lemmon	Mount Lemmon Survey	·	1.4 km	MPC · JPL
477464	2009 XK_{1}	—	December 8, 2009	San Marcello	San Marcello	NYS	910 m	MPC · JPL
477465	2009 XZ_{1}	—	December 11, 2009	Catalina	CSS	ATE · PHA	160 m	MPC · JPL
477466	2009 XM_{17}	—	December 15, 2009	Mount Lemmon	Mount Lemmon Survey	·	930 m	MPC · JPL
477467	2009 XA_{20}	—	December 15, 2009	Mount Lemmon	Mount Lemmon Survey	·	1.7 km	MPC · JPL
477468	2009 YO_{3}	—	September 29, 2005	Mount Lemmon	Mount Lemmon Survey	MAS	530 m	MPC · JPL
477469	2009 YU_{5}	—	December 17, 2009	Mount Lemmon	Mount Lemmon Survey	NYS	940 m	MPC · JPL
477470	2009 YH_{7}	—	December 16, 2009	Kitt Peak	Spacewatch	NYS	920 m	MPC · JPL
477471	2010 AG_{2}	—	January 7, 2010	Bisei SG Center	BATTeRS	·	1.3 km	MPC · JPL
477472	2010 AS_{5}	—	January 5, 2010	Kitt Peak	Spacewatch	NYS	1.1 km	MPC · JPL
477473	2010 AE_{8}	—	January 6, 2010	Catalina	CSS	·	1.8 km	MPC · JPL
477474	2010 AB_{9}	—	October 30, 2005	Kitt Peak	Spacewatch	·	950 m	MPC · JPL
477475	2010 AL_{12}	—	January 6, 2010	Catalina	CSS	·	1.2 km	MPC · JPL
477476	2010 AK_{18}	—	January 7, 2010	Mount Lemmon	Mount Lemmon Survey	T_{j} (2.98) · 3:2	4.3 km	MPC · JPL
477477	2010 AX_{21}	—	January 6, 2010	Kitt Peak	Spacewatch	(194)	2.3 km	MPC · JPL
477478	2010 AO_{35}	—	January 7, 2010	Kitt Peak	Spacewatch	NYS	860 m	MPC · JPL
477479	2010 AG_{38}	—	January 7, 2010	Kitt Peak	Spacewatch	·	1.5 km	MPC · JPL
477480	2010 AX_{43}	—	January 6, 2010	Mount Lemmon	Mount Lemmon Survey	·	900 m	MPC · JPL
477481	2010 AN_{71}	—	January 12, 2010	Kitt Peak	Spacewatch	EUN	1.2 km	MPC · JPL
477482	2010 AN_{131}	—	January 15, 2010	WISE	WISE	·	4.0 km	MPC · JPL
477483	2010 AO_{132}	—	January 14, 2010	WISE	WISE	·	3.2 km	MPC · JPL
477484	2010 BO_{1}	—	January 18, 2010	Dauban	Kugel, F.	·	2.0 km	MPC · JPL
477485	2010 BU_{3}	—	November 6, 2005	Kitt Peak	Spacewatch	NYS	890 m	MPC · JPL
477486	2010 BL_{51}	—	May 22, 2006	Kitt Peak	Spacewatch	·	3.5 km	MPC · JPL
477487	2010 BW_{66}	—	December 21, 2004	Catalina	CSS	·	3.5 km	MPC · JPL
477488	2010 CA_{2}	—	February 5, 2010	Catalina	CSS	·	980 m	MPC · JPL
477489	2010 CU_{11}	—	February 9, 2010	WISE	WISE	·	2.9 km	MPC · JPL
477490	2010 CG_{18}	—	February 6, 2010	WISE	WISE	AMO	650 m	MPC · JPL
477491	2010 CD_{19}	—	February 14, 2010	Catalina	CSS	APO +1km	740 m	MPC · JPL
477492	2010 CG_{19}	—	February 14, 2010	Socorro	LINEAR	AMO	460 m	MPC · JPL
477493	2010 CN_{24}	—	February 9, 2010	Mount Lemmon	Mount Lemmon Survey	·	1.7 km	MPC · JPL
477494	2010 CM_{38}	—	January 8, 2010	Mount Lemmon	Mount Lemmon Survey	EUN	1.2 km	MPC · JPL
477495	2010 CH_{56}	—	November 15, 2009	Mount Lemmon	Mount Lemmon Survey	EUN	1.9 km	MPC · JPL
477496	2010 CK_{62}	—	February 9, 2010	Kitt Peak	Spacewatch	·	1.7 km	MPC · JPL
477497	2010 CO_{65}	—	February 9, 2010	Kitt Peak	Spacewatch	·	2.0 km	MPC · JPL
477498	2010 CQ_{79}	—	February 13, 2010	Mount Lemmon	Mount Lemmon Survey	·	1 km	MPC · JPL
477499	2010 CW_{81}	—	February 13, 2010	Mount Lemmon	Mount Lemmon Survey	ADE	1.7 km	MPC · JPL
477500	2010 CC_{82}	—	December 20, 2009	Mount Lemmon	Mount Lemmon Survey	·	2.1 km	MPC · JPL

== 477501–477600 ==
back to top

Designation			Discovery			Properties		Ref
Permanent	Provisional	Named after	Date	Site	Discoverer(s)	Category	Diam.	Ref
477501	2010 CK_{89}	—	February 14, 2010	Mount Lemmon	Mount Lemmon Survey	·	910 m	MPC · JPL
477502	2010 CH_{93}	—	February 14, 2010	Kitt Peak	Spacewatch	·	1.2 km	MPC · JPL
477503	2010 CL_{94}	—	September 27, 2003	Kitt Peak	Spacewatch	·	1.6 km	MPC · JPL
477504	2010 CQ_{101}	—	February 14, 2010	Mount Lemmon	Mount Lemmon Survey	·	1.4 km	MPC · JPL
477505	2010 CH_{105}	—	February 14, 2010	Mount Lemmon	Mount Lemmon Survey	·	2.1 km	MPC · JPL
477506	2010 CE_{125}	—	February 6, 2010	Mount Lemmon	Mount Lemmon Survey	H	460 m	MPC · JPL
477507	2010 CQ_{129}	—	February 14, 2010	Catalina	CSS	·	1.5 km	MPC · JPL
477508	2010 CK_{140}	—	February 15, 2010	WISE	WISE	·	2.2 km	MPC · JPL
477509	2010 CZ_{140}	—	February 15, 2010	Catalina	CSS	·	2.2 km	MPC · JPL
477510	2010 CM_{144}	—	February 13, 2010	Catalina	CSS	·	1.6 km	MPC · JPL
477511	2010 CK_{150}	—	October 6, 2008	Mount Lemmon	Mount Lemmon Survey	·	1.4 km	MPC · JPL
477512	2010 CL_{155}	—	February 15, 2010	Kitt Peak	Spacewatch	·	2.3 km	MPC · JPL
477513	2010 CD_{160}	—	February 5, 2010	Catalina	CSS	·	1.3 km	MPC · JPL
477514	2010 CT_{168}	—	February 6, 2010	Kitt Peak	Spacewatch	·	1.1 km	MPC · JPL
477515	2010 CQ_{169}	—	February 9, 2010	Kitt Peak	Spacewatch	·	2.3 km	MPC · JPL
477516	2010 CX_{216}	—	May 4, 2010	Siding Spring	SSS	·	1.8 km	MPC · JPL
477517	2010 CB_{230}	—	December 31, 2008	Kitt Peak	Spacewatch	·	1.8 km	MPC · JPL
477518	2010 DV_{45}	—	February 17, 2010	Kitt Peak	Spacewatch	·	1.8 km	MPC · JPL
477519	2010 DJ_{56}	—	February 23, 2010	WISE	WISE	APO · PHA	320 m	MPC · JPL
477520	2010 DV_{64}	—	February 26, 2010	WISE	WISE	·	3.5 km	MPC · JPL
477521	2010 DQ_{77}	—	February 16, 2010	Haleakala	Pan-STARRS 1	EUN	1.3 km	MPC · JPL
477522	2010 DA_{79}	—	January 20, 2006	Kitt Peak	Spacewatch	NYS	1.2 km	MPC · JPL
477523	2010 ES_{32}	—	February 17, 2010	Kitt Peak	Spacewatch	·	1.7 km	MPC · JPL
477524	2010 EH_{43}	—	March 13, 2010	Mount Lemmon	Mount Lemmon Survey	AMO	990 m	MPC · JPL
477525	2010 EF_{69}	—	March 12, 2010	Mount Lemmon	Mount Lemmon Survey	·	2.9 km	MPC · JPL
477526	2010 EP_{73}	—	March 13, 2010	Catalina	CSS	·	1.9 km	MPC · JPL
477527	2010 EO_{84}	—	March 4, 2010	Kitt Peak	Spacewatch	·	1.5 km	MPC · JPL
477528	2010 EP_{84}	—	March 13, 2010	Kitt Peak	Spacewatch	·	780 m	MPC · JPL
477529	2010 EH_{86}	—	March 13, 2010	Kitt Peak	Spacewatch	·	2.0 km	MPC · JPL
477530	2010 EU_{87}	—	March 13, 2010	Mount Lemmon	Mount Lemmon Survey	JUN	1.2 km	MPC · JPL
477531	2010 EZ_{87}	—	March 14, 2010	La Sagra	OAM	·	2.7 km	MPC · JPL
477532	2010 ET_{96}	—	February 18, 2010	Kitt Peak	Spacewatch	·	2.3 km	MPC · JPL
477533	2010 EX_{97}	—	March 14, 2010	Mount Lemmon	Mount Lemmon Survey	·	1.7 km	MPC · JPL
477534	2010 EL_{106}	—	March 15, 2010	Catalina	CSS	·	2.9 km	MPC · JPL
477535	2010 EZ_{112}	—	September 13, 2007	Mount Lemmon	Mount Lemmon Survey	·	1.4 km	MPC · JPL
477536	2010 EF_{123}	—	March 15, 2010	Kitt Peak	Spacewatch	·	2.3 km	MPC · JPL
477537	2010 EJ_{138}	—	March 13, 2010	Kitt Peak	Spacewatch	MAR	970 m	MPC · JPL
477538	2010 EU_{138}	—	March 12, 2010	Catalina	CSS	H	450 m	MPC · JPL
477539	2010 EJ_{140}	—	March 12, 2010	Catalina	CSS	·	2.6 km	MPC · JPL
477540	2010 EQ_{171}	—	December 19, 2009	Mount Lemmon	Mount Lemmon Survey	·	1.8 km	MPC · JPL
477541	2010 FG_{14}	—	February 19, 2010	Mount Lemmon	Mount Lemmon Survey	·	1.7 km	MPC · JPL
477542	2010 FY_{16}	—	March 18, 2010	Kitt Peak	Spacewatch	·	1.4 km	MPC · JPL
477543	2010 FS_{20}	—	March 18, 2010	Mount Lemmon	Mount Lemmon Survey	·	2.0 km	MPC · JPL
477544	2010 FX_{22}	—	February 27, 2006	Kitt Peak	Spacewatch	·	1.4 km	MPC · JPL
477545	2010 FJ_{26}	—	March 19, 2010	Mount Lemmon	Mount Lemmon Survey	·	1.8 km	MPC · JPL
477546	2010 FT_{29}	—	March 16, 2010	Kitt Peak	Spacewatch	·	1.7 km	MPC · JPL
477547	2010 FR_{48}	—	March 17, 2010	Catalina	CSS	·	2.3 km	MPC · JPL
477548	2010 FT_{53}	—	March 19, 2010	Kitt Peak	Spacewatch	·	1.2 km	MPC · JPL
477549	2010 FS_{56}	—	March 19, 2010	Kitt Peak	Spacewatch	JUN	1.1 km	MPC · JPL
477550	2010 FS_{82}	—	March 21, 2010	Catalina	CSS	·	2.3 km	MPC · JPL
477551	2010 FA_{85}	—	February 13, 2010	Mount Lemmon	Mount Lemmon Survey	·	2.9 km	MPC · JPL
477552	2010 FK_{87}	—	March 18, 2010	Kitt Peak	Spacewatch	·	2.2 km	MPC · JPL
477553	2010 FQ_{90}	—	September 10, 2007	Mount Lemmon	Mount Lemmon Survey	·	1.4 km	MPC · JPL
477554	2010 FO_{101}	—	March 25, 2010	Mount Lemmon	Mount Lemmon Survey	H	580 m	MPC · JPL
477555	2010 GF_{75}	—	April 5, 2010	Catalina	CSS	·	2.0 km	MPC · JPL
477556	2010 GP_{75}	—	March 16, 2010	Mount Lemmon	Mount Lemmon Survey	·	1.9 km	MPC · JPL
477557	2010 GV_{97}	—	March 18, 2010	Kitt Peak	Spacewatch	·	1.7 km	MPC · JPL
477558	2010 GW_{101}	—	October 28, 1994	Kitt Peak	Spacewatch	·	1.7 km	MPC · JPL
477559	2010 GJ_{108}	—	April 8, 2010	Mount Lemmon	Mount Lemmon Survey	H	520 m	MPC · JPL
477560	2010 GX_{109}	—	April 9, 2010	Kitt Peak	Spacewatch	·	1.9 km	MPC · JPL
477561	2010 GY_{113}	—	April 10, 2010	Kitt Peak	Spacewatch	·	1.4 km	MPC · JPL
477562	2010 GE_{114}	—	April 10, 2010	Kitt Peak	Spacewatch	·	1.7 km	MPC · JPL
477563	2010 GA_{115}	—	April 10, 2010	Kitt Peak	Spacewatch	·	890 m	MPC · JPL
477564	2010 GJ_{122}	—	December 30, 2000	Socorro	LINEAR	(5)	1.4 km	MPC · JPL
477565	2010 GX_{126}	—	November 2, 2007	Mount Lemmon	Mount Lemmon Survey	·	2.1 km	MPC · JPL
477566	2010 GG_{128}	—	March 17, 2010	Catalina	CSS	H	600 m	MPC · JPL
477567	2010 GE_{129}	—	April 26, 2006	Mount Lemmon	Mount Lemmon Survey	·	1.6 km	MPC · JPL
477568	2010 GV_{133}	—	April 11, 2010	Mount Lemmon	Mount Lemmon Survey	·	2.1 km	MPC · JPL
477569	2010 GY_{145}	—	April 13, 2010	Catalina	CSS	·	1.8 km	MPC · JPL
477570	2010 GK_{160}	—	April 8, 2010	Catalina	CSS	·	3.0 km	MPC · JPL
477571	2010 HC_{44}	—	April 23, 2010	WISE	WISE	·	3.4 km	MPC · JPL
477572	2010 HH_{74}	—	April 28, 2010	WISE	WISE	·	3.2 km	MPC · JPL
477573	2010 HV_{77}	—	October 14, 2007	Kitt Peak	Spacewatch	·	2.1 km	MPC · JPL
477574	2010 HQ_{105}	—	October 30, 2007	Kitt Peak	Spacewatch	·	1.7 km	MPC · JPL
477575	2010 HZ_{105}	—	October 18, 2007	Kitt Peak	Spacewatch	AGN	1.1 km	MPC · JPL
477576	2010 JS_{1}	—	November 3, 2007	Kitt Peak	Spacewatch	·	2.0 km	MPC · JPL
477577	2010 JN_{2}	—	March 21, 2010	Kitt Peak	Spacewatch	MAR	1.0 km	MPC · JPL
477578	2010 JY_{14}	—	October 29, 2003	Kitt Peak	Spacewatch	·	1.8 km	MPC · JPL
477579	2010 JH_{15}	—	April 11, 2010	Mount Lemmon	Mount Lemmon Survey	H	630 m	MPC · JPL
477580	2010 JO_{17}	—	May 3, 2010	WISE	WISE	T_{j} (2.98)	3.3 km	MPC · JPL
477581	2010 JP_{20}	—	May 3, 2010	WISE	WISE	·	3.7 km	MPC · JPL
477582	2010 JQ_{37}	—	March 16, 2005	Mount Lemmon	Mount Lemmon Survey	·	2.7 km	MPC · JPL
477583	2010 JO_{43}	—	May 3, 2010	Kitt Peak	Spacewatch	·	2.0 km	MPC · JPL
477584	2010 JT_{43}	—	May 4, 2010	Kitt Peak	Spacewatch	MAR	1.3 km	MPC · JPL
477585	2010 JJ_{46}	—	May 7, 2010	Kitt Peak	Spacewatch	·	1.9 km	MPC · JPL
477586	2010 JD_{53}	—	February 9, 2010	Catalina	CSS	·	2.1 km	MPC · JPL
477587	2010 JT_{86}	—	May 12, 2010	WISE	WISE	T_{j} (2.85)	4.6 km	MPC · JPL
477588	2010 JD_{87}	—	May 7, 2010	WISE	WISE	APO	690 m	MPC · JPL
477589	2010 JA_{89}	—	May 9, 2010	WISE	WISE	·	2.7 km	MPC · JPL
477590	2010 JN_{98}	—	May 20, 2010	Mount Lemmon	Mount Lemmon Survey	T_{j} (2.99)	3.6 km	MPC · JPL
477591	2010 JA_{102}	—	May 11, 2010	WISE	WISE	·	4.1 km	MPC · JPL
477592	2010 JF_{119}	—	May 11, 2010	Mount Lemmon	Mount Lemmon Survey	JUN	1.1 km	MPC · JPL
477593	2010 JR_{131}	—	May 13, 2010	WISE	WISE	T_{j} (2.97)	3.5 km	MPC · JPL
477594	2010 JW_{142}	—	May 15, 2010	WISE	WISE	·	3.8 km	MPC · JPL
477595	2010 JX_{142}	—	May 15, 2010	WISE	WISE	·	3.4 km	MPC · JPL
477596	2010 JE_{155}	—	April 8, 2010	Kitt Peak	Spacewatch	·	1.4 km	MPC · JPL
477597	2010 JN_{163}	—	May 26, 2006	Mount Lemmon	Mount Lemmon Survey	·	1.9 km	MPC · JPL
477598	2010 JX_{171}	—	February 15, 2010	Mount Lemmon	Mount Lemmon Survey	·	1.8 km	MPC · JPL
477599	2010 KT_{7}	—	May 18, 2010	Siding Spring	SSS	·	1.1 km	MPC · JPL
477600	2010 KU_{13}	—	May 16, 2010	WISE	WISE	·	2.8 km	MPC · JPL

== 477601–477700 ==
back to top

Designation			Discovery			Properties		Ref
Permanent	Provisional	Named after	Date	Site	Discoverer(s)	Category	Diam.	Ref
477601	2010 KH_{17}	—	May 17, 2010	WISE	WISE	·	3.4 km	MPC · JPL
477602	2010 KJ_{36}	—	February 17, 2010	Kitt Peak	Spacewatch	·	1.4 km	MPC · JPL
477603	2010 KG_{46}	—	May 21, 2010	WISE	WISE	·	4.4 km	MPC · JPL
477604	2010 KX_{52}	—	May 23, 2010	WISE	WISE	·	2.6 km	MPC · JPL
477605	2010 KF_{56}	—	May 23, 2010	WISE	WISE	·	3.3 km	MPC · JPL
477606	2010 KN_{84}	—	May 26, 2010	WISE	WISE	·	4.6 km	MPC · JPL
477607	2010 KU_{90}	—	January 14, 2001	Kitt Peak	Spacewatch	·	5.4 km	MPC · JPL
477608	2010 KS_{103}	—	May 29, 2010	WISE	WISE	·	2.1 km	MPC · JPL
477609	2010 KC_{109}	—	May 29, 2010	WISE	WISE	·	3.9 km	MPC · JPL
477610	2010 KM_{114}	—	October 1, 2005	Kitt Peak	Spacewatch	·	2.1 km	MPC · JPL
477611	2010 KL_{115}	—	May 30, 2010	WISE	WISE	·	3.2 km	MPC · JPL
477612	2010 KZ_{119}	—	May 30, 2010	WISE	WISE	·	3.7 km	MPC · JPL
477613	2010 KE_{121}	—	May 31, 2010	WISE	WISE	T_{j} (2.99)	4.8 km	MPC · JPL
477614	2010 KW_{121}	—	May 31, 2010	WISE	WISE	·	4.4 km	MPC · JPL
477615	2010 KT_{122}	—	May 31, 2010	WISE	WISE	·	3.8 km	MPC · JPL
477616	2010 LR_{2}	—	June 1, 2010	WISE	WISE	·	2.5 km	MPC · JPL
477617	2010 LT_{5}	—	June 1, 2010	WISE	WISE	·	5.0 km	MPC · JPL
477618	2010 LF_{13}	—	June 2, 2010	WISE	WISE	·	4.8 km	MPC · JPL
477619	2010 LU_{32}	—	June 6, 2010	WISE	WISE	·	4.0 km	MPC · JPL
477620	2010 LR_{36}	—	June 1, 2010	Kitt Peak	Spacewatch	H	580 m	MPC · JPL
477621	2010 LD_{37}	—	June 6, 2010	WISE	WISE	·	2.4 km	MPC · JPL
477622	2010 LT_{51}	—	June 8, 2010	WISE	WISE	THM	2.4 km	MPC · JPL
477623	2010 LU_{55}	—	June 9, 2010	WISE	WISE	·	2.1 km	MPC · JPL
477624	2010 LZ_{56}	—	June 9, 2010	WISE	WISE	·	2.6 km	MPC · JPL
477625	2010 LR_{58}	—	June 9, 2010	WISE	WISE	·	2.8 km	MPC · JPL
477626	2010 LF_{68}	—	June 13, 2010	Kitt Peak	Spacewatch	·	4.9 km	MPC · JPL
477627	2010 LY_{69}	—	June 9, 2010	WISE	WISE	·	3.6 km	MPC · JPL
477628	2010 LN_{78}	—	June 10, 2010	WISE	WISE	·	4.9 km	MPC · JPL
477629	2010 LZ_{87}	—	June 12, 2010	WISE	WISE	·	3.4 km	MPC · JPL
477630	2010 LZ_{96}	—	June 13, 2010	WISE	WISE	·	3.6 km	MPC · JPL
477631	2010 LG_{97}	—	June 13, 2010	WISE	WISE	·	3.7 km	MPC · JPL
477632	2010 LT_{112}	—	April 25, 2010	WISE	WISE	·	3.8 km	MPC · JPL
477633	2010 LD_{118}	—	June 14, 2010	WISE	WISE	·	3.3 km	MPC · JPL
477634	2010 LU_{122}	—	December 13, 2006	Mount Lemmon	Mount Lemmon Survey	EOS	2.4 km	MPC · JPL
477635	2010 MU	—	June 18, 2010	Kitt Peak	Spacewatch	·	4.0 km	MPC · JPL
477636	2010 MQ_{6}	—	June 16, 2010	WISE	WISE	·	4.5 km	MPC · JPL
477637	2010 MK_{20}	—	June 18, 2010	WISE	WISE	·	4.3 km	MPC · JPL
477638	2010 MW_{31}	—	December 1, 2005	Kitt Peak	Spacewatch	·	2.6 km	MPC · JPL
477639	2010 MC_{37}	—	June 21, 2010	WISE	WISE	·	3.6 km	MPC · JPL
477640	2010 MD_{41}	—	June 22, 2010	WISE	WISE	·	4.2 km	MPC · JPL
477641	2010 MN_{61}	—	June 24, 2010	WISE	WISE	LIX	2.9 km	MPC · JPL
477642	2010 ME_{68}	—	June 25, 2010	WISE	WISE	·	5.6 km	MPC · JPL
477643	2010 MO_{74}	—	June 26, 2010	WISE	WISE	·	3.0 km	MPC · JPL
477644	2010 MP_{77}	—	June 26, 2010	WISE	WISE	·	2.3 km	MPC · JPL
477645	2010 MJ_{84}	—	June 27, 2010	WISE	WISE	·	2.1 km	MPC · JPL
477646	2010 ME_{87}	—	June 27, 2010	WISE	WISE	CYB	4.5 km	MPC · JPL
477647	2010 MQ_{89}	—	December 7, 1999	Kitt Peak	Spacewatch	·	3.1 km	MPC · JPL
477648	2010 MX_{89}	—	June 27, 2010	WISE	WISE	·	2.0 km	MPC · JPL
477649	2010 ML_{102}	—	April 8, 2014	Haleakala	Pan-STARRS 1	·	4.2 km	MPC · JPL
477650	2010 MR_{105}	—	June 30, 2010	WISE	WISE	·	3.9 km	MPC · JPL
477651	2010 NZ_{31}	—	July 7, 2010	WISE	WISE	·	3.7 km	MPC · JPL
477652	2010 NT_{44}	—	May 5, 2010	Mount Lemmon	Mount Lemmon Survey	·	3.1 km	MPC · JPL
477653	2010 NH_{45}	—	July 9, 2010	WISE	WISE	fast	2.8 km	MPC · JPL
477654	2010 NG_{49}	—	July 9, 2010	WISE	WISE	THM	3.8 km	MPC · JPL
477655	2010 NF_{61}	—	July 11, 2010	WISE	WISE	·	4.4 km	MPC · JPL
477656	2010 ND_{62}	—	July 11, 2010	WISE	WISE	VER	3.1 km	MPC · JPL
477657	2010 NJ_{67}	—	July 14, 2010	WISE	WISE	·	4.0 km	MPC · JPL
477658	2010 NA_{69}	—	July 14, 2010	WISE	WISE	·	4.0 km	MPC · JPL
477659	2010 NN_{82}	—	July 1, 2010	WISE	WISE	·	3.6 km	MPC · JPL
477660	2010 NJ_{91}	—	April 6, 2008	Kitt Peak	Spacewatch	·	5.0 km	MPC · JPL
477661	2010 NB_{98}	—	July 11, 2010	WISE	WISE	·	3.1 km	MPC · JPL
477662	2010 NU_{101}	—	July 12, 2010	WISE	WISE	·	3.8 km	MPC · JPL
477663	2010 NY_{117}	—	July 5, 2010	Kitt Peak	Spacewatch	·	1.8 km	MPC · JPL
477664	2010 OE_{2}	—	July 16, 2010	WISE	WISE	·	3.4 km	MPC · JPL
477665	2010 OZ_{11}	—	July 17, 2010	WISE	WISE	·	3.2 km	MPC · JPL
477666	2010 OG_{14}	—	July 17, 2010	WISE	WISE	SYL · CYB	4.6 km	MPC · JPL
477667	2010 OG_{15}	—	July 17, 2010	WISE	WISE	·	4.7 km	MPC · JPL
477668	2010 OY_{43}	—	July 21, 2010	WISE	WISE	·	4.1 km	MPC · JPL
477669	2010 OA_{63}	—	October 16, 2003	Kitt Peak	Spacewatch	DOR	2.2 km	MPC · JPL
477670	2010 OZ_{77}	—	January 4, 2006	Catalina	CSS	THB	2.9 km	MPC · JPL
477671	2010 OH_{85}	—	July 26, 2010	WISE	WISE	·	2.9 km	MPC · JPL
477672	2010 OJ_{101}	—	July 5, 2010	Kitt Peak	Spacewatch	·	2.8 km	MPC · JPL
477673	2010 OT_{109}	—	July 29, 2010	WISE	WISE	·	5.2 km	MPC · JPL
477674	2010 OS_{115}	—	July 30, 2010	WISE	WISE	·	2.3 km	MPC · JPL
477675	2010 OY_{125}	—	May 4, 2010	Kitt Peak	Spacewatch	·	2.8 km	MPC · JPL
477676	2010 PE_{47}	—	August 7, 2010	WISE	WISE	·	3.8 km	MPC · JPL
477677	2010 PS_{60}	—	April 8, 2008	Mount Lemmon	Mount Lemmon Survey	·	2.6 km	MPC · JPL
477678	2010 PX_{80}	—	May 17, 2009	Mount Lemmon	Mount Lemmon Survey	·	2.7 km	MPC · JPL
477679	2010 QR_{4}	—	September 7, 1999	Kitt Peak	Spacewatch	·	3.5 km	MPC · JPL
477680	2010 RV_{4}	—	August 10, 2010	Kitt Peak	Spacewatch	·	2.6 km	MPC · JPL
477681	2010 RO_{8}	—	October 2, 2005	Mount Lemmon	Mount Lemmon Survey	·	1.9 km	MPC · JPL
477682	2010 RL_{16}	—	December 21, 2006	Kitt Peak	Spacewatch	·	3.5 km	MPC · JPL
477683	2010 RW_{36}	—	September 2, 2010	Socorro	LINEAR	·	2.9 km	MPC · JPL
477684	2010 RP_{37}	—	September 4, 2010	La Sagra	OAM	·	3.2 km	MPC · JPL
477685	2010 RR_{48}	—	September 4, 2010	Kitt Peak	Spacewatch	·	2.7 km	MPC · JPL
477686	2010 RU_{49}	—	September 4, 2010	Kitt Peak	Spacewatch	·	3.1 km	MPC · JPL
477687	2010 RE_{65}	—	July 12, 2004	Siding Spring	SSS	·	3.3 km	MPC · JPL
477688	2010 RT_{67}	—	September 5, 2010	Kitt Peak	Spacewatch	·	2.5 km	MPC · JPL
477689	2010 RN_{69}	—	December 27, 2006	Mount Lemmon	Mount Lemmon Survey	·	2.8 km	MPC · JPL
477690	2010 RQ_{91}	—	October 24, 2005	Kitt Peak	Spacewatch	·	2.4 km	MPC · JPL
477691	2010 RV_{92}	—	June 12, 2010	WISE	WISE	URS	4.7 km	MPC · JPL
477692	2010 RR_{96}	—	September 9, 2010	Kitt Peak	Spacewatch	·	2.9 km	MPC · JPL
477693	2010 RM_{97}	—	March 26, 2008	Mount Lemmon	Mount Lemmon Survey	·	3.2 km	MPC · JPL
477694	2010 RA_{99}	—	September 2, 2010	Mount Lemmon	Mount Lemmon Survey	·	2.4 km	MPC · JPL
477695	2010 RV_{110}	—	September 11, 2010	Kitt Peak	Spacewatch	·	3.0 km	MPC · JPL
477696	2010 RM_{111}	—	September 11, 2010	Kitt Peak	Spacewatch	THM	1.9 km	MPC · JPL
477697	2010 RG_{113}	—	May 27, 2008	Kitt Peak	Spacewatch	·	3.0 km	MPC · JPL
477698	2010 RR_{116}	—	September 11, 2010	Kitt Peak	Spacewatch	·	3.2 km	MPC · JPL
477699	2010 RA_{118}	—	September 11, 2010	Kitt Peak	Spacewatch	CYB	4.6 km	MPC · JPL
477700	2010 RA_{124}	—	March 6, 2008	Mount Lemmon	Mount Lemmon Survey	·	2.9 km	MPC · JPL

== 477701–477800 ==
back to top

Designation			Discovery			Properties		Ref
Permanent	Provisional	Named after	Date	Site	Discoverer(s)	Category	Diam.	Ref
477701	2010 RL_{132}	—	November 28, 2005	Catalina	CSS	·	3.8 km	MPC · JPL
477702	2010 RA_{141}	—	September 13, 2010	La Sagra	OAM	·	3.1 km	MPC · JPL
477703	2010 RB_{141}	—	February 25, 2007	Kitt Peak	Spacewatch	·	2.6 km	MPC · JPL
477704	2010 RW_{143}	—	September 14, 2010	Kitt Peak	Spacewatch	·	2.7 km	MPC · JPL
477705	2010 RY_{143}	—	July 8, 2010	WISE	WISE	LIX	3.4 km	MPC · JPL
477706	2010 RD_{145}	—	September 14, 2010	Kitt Peak	Spacewatch	·	2.7 km	MPC · JPL
477707	2010 RO_{148}	—	September 15, 2010	Kitt Peak	Spacewatch	·	2.6 km	MPC · JPL
477708	2010 RX_{149}	—	September 15, 2010	Kitt Peak	Spacewatch	·	3.4 km	MPC · JPL
477709	2010 RF_{164}	—	October 8, 2005	Catalina	CSS	·	2.8 km	MPC · JPL
477710	2010 RK_{166}	—	September 11, 2010	Kitt Peak	Spacewatch	·	3.1 km	MPC · JPL
477711	2010 RB_{168}	—	September 1, 2010	Mount Lemmon	Mount Lemmon Survey	·	3.4 km	MPC · JPL
477712	2010 RJ_{170}	—	September 3, 2010	Mount Lemmon	Mount Lemmon Survey	·	2.8 km	MPC · JPL
477713	2010 RY_{175}	—	September 10, 2010	Kitt Peak	Spacewatch	HYG	2.4 km	MPC · JPL
477714	2010 SV	—	September 16, 2010	Mount Lemmon	Mount Lemmon Survey	·	2.4 km	MPC · JPL
477715	2010 SL_{6}	—	September 16, 2010	Mount Lemmon	Mount Lemmon Survey	·	660 m	MPC · JPL
477716	2010 SZ_{8}	—	February 6, 2007	Mount Lemmon	Mount Lemmon Survey	·	3.4 km	MPC · JPL
477717	2010 ST_{14}	—	September 16, 2010	Kitt Peak	Spacewatch	·	2.8 km	MPC · JPL
477718	2010 SD_{15}	—	March 1, 2008	Kitt Peak	Spacewatch	·	2.8 km	MPC · JPL
477719	2010 SG_{15}	—	September 29, 2010	Mount Lemmon	Mount Lemmon Survey	AMO	30 m	MPC · JPL
477720	2010 SW_{17}	—	September 17, 2010	Kitt Peak	Spacewatch	T_{j} (2.99)	2.7 km	MPC · JPL
477721	2010 SW_{20}	—	August 6, 2010	Kitt Peak	Spacewatch	·	3.1 km	MPC · JPL
477722	2010 SA_{21}	—	November 26, 2005	Kitt Peak	Spacewatch	·	2.2 km	MPC · JPL
477723	2010 SK_{21}	—	July 10, 2010	WISE	WISE	·	2.7 km	MPC · JPL
477724	2010 SC_{22}	—	September 29, 2010	Mount Lemmon	Mount Lemmon Survey	·	3.6 km	MPC · JPL
477725	2010 SN_{25}	—	September 17, 2010	Mount Lemmon	Mount Lemmon Survey	·	2.8 km	MPC · JPL
477726	2010 SN_{26}	—	September 29, 2010	Mount Lemmon	Mount Lemmon Survey	·	3.3 km	MPC · JPL
477727	2010 SY_{31}	—	November 30, 1999	Kitt Peak	Spacewatch	·	2.7 km	MPC · JPL
477728	2010 TX_{3}	—	September 15, 2010	Kitt Peak	Spacewatch	·	2.7 km	MPC · JPL
477729	2010 TP_{12}	—	September 19, 2010	Kitt Peak	Spacewatch	·	3.2 km	MPC · JPL
477730	2010 TV_{34}	—	October 2, 2010	Kitt Peak	Spacewatch	VER	2.5 km	MPC · JPL
477731	2010 TX_{44}	—	October 3, 2010	Kitt Peak	Spacewatch	CYB	4.0 km	MPC · JPL
477732	2010 TK_{69}	—	September 9, 2010	Kitt Peak	Spacewatch	·	2.9 km	MPC · JPL
477733	2010 TU_{69}	—	May 2, 2009	Mount Lemmon	Mount Lemmon Survey	·	2.6 km	MPC · JPL
477734	2010 TL_{77}	—	May 1, 2008	Mount Lemmon	Mount Lemmon Survey	·	2.3 km	MPC · JPL
477735	2010 TC_{80}	—	September 10, 2010	Kitt Peak	Spacewatch	·	2.5 km	MPC · JPL
477736	2010 TT_{88}	—	December 7, 2005	Kitt Peak	Spacewatch	·	2.2 km	MPC · JPL
477737	2010 TZ_{99}	—	September 4, 2010	Kitt Peak	Spacewatch	·	3.1 km	MPC · JPL
477738	2010 TR_{107}	—	September 17, 2010	Kitt Peak	Spacewatch	VER	2.5 km	MPC · JPL
477739	2010 TV_{121}	—	November 6, 2005	Kitt Peak	Spacewatch	·	3.2 km	MPC · JPL
477740	2010 TW_{138}	—	October 11, 2010	Mount Lemmon	Mount Lemmon Survey	T_{j} (2.95)	4.2 km	MPC · JPL
477741	2010 TF_{141}	—	September 16, 2010	Mount Lemmon	Mount Lemmon Survey	·	2.8 km	MPC · JPL
477742	2010 TG_{142}	—	October 11, 2010	Mount Lemmon	Mount Lemmon Survey	·	3.6 km	MPC · JPL
477743	2010 TX_{166}	—	March 9, 2007	Kitt Peak	Spacewatch	·	2.6 km	MPC · JPL
477744	2010 TX_{177}	—	July 20, 2004	Siding Spring	SSS	·	3.9 km	MPC · JPL
477745	2010 TW_{179}	—	April 3, 2008	Mount Lemmon	Mount Lemmon Survey	VER	2.1 km	MPC · JPL
477746	2010 UL_{9}	—	March 16, 2007	Mount Lemmon	Mount Lemmon Survey	·	3.4 km	MPC · JPL
477747	2010 UR_{65}	—	May 11, 2002	Socorro	LINEAR	·	3.8 km	MPC · JPL
477748	2010 VB_{32}	—	November 3, 2010	Mount Lemmon	Mount Lemmon Survey	·	3.8 km	MPC · JPL
477749	2010 VY_{42}	—	September 18, 2010	Mount Lemmon	Mount Lemmon Survey	·	2.4 km	MPC · JPL
477750	2010 VE_{44}	—	July 28, 2010	WISE	WISE	·	3.6 km	MPC · JPL
477751	2010 VE_{46}	—	November 2, 2010	Kitt Peak	Spacewatch	·	750 m	MPC · JPL
477752	2010 VY_{120}	—	December 27, 2005	Kitt Peak	Spacewatch	·	2.0 km	MPC · JPL
477753	2010 VN_{129}	—	February 15, 2001	Socorro	LINEAR	·	3.5 km	MPC · JPL
477754	2010 VS_{214}	—	September 12, 2004	Kitt Peak	Spacewatch	·	2.8 km	MPC · JPL
477755	2010 VX_{215}	—	September 17, 2010	Mount Lemmon	Mount Lemmon Survey	·	3.2 km	MPC · JPL
477756	2010 WK_{5}	—	November 6, 2010	Kitt Peak	Spacewatch	·	830 m	MPC · JPL
477757	2010 WM_{67}	—	November 10, 2010	Kitt Peak	Spacewatch	·	590 m	MPC · JPL
477758	2010 WW_{69}	—	November 7, 2007	Mount Lemmon	Mount Lemmon Survey	·	710 m	MPC · JPL
477759	2010 WD_{73}	—	November 3, 2010	Kitt Peak	Spacewatch	·	570 m	MPC · JPL
477760	2010 XU_{47}	—	November 1, 2010	Mount Lemmon	Mount Lemmon Survey	·	2.7 km	MPC · JPL
477761	2010 XW_{51}	—	November 8, 2010	Mount Lemmon	Mount Lemmon Survey	·	3.4 km	MPC · JPL
477762	2010 XZ_{67}	—	December 6, 2010	Catalina	CSS	AMO	330 m	MPC · JPL
477763	2010 YJ_{2}	—	November 5, 2010	Mount Lemmon	Mount Lemmon Survey	·	3.8 km	MPC · JPL
477764	2011 AV_{18}	—	February 2, 2008	Kitt Peak	Spacewatch	·	540 m	MPC · JPL
477765	2011 AH_{20}	—	January 11, 2008	Mount Lemmon	Mount Lemmon Survey	·	610 m	MPC · JPL
477766	2011 AQ_{24}	—	November 15, 2010	Mount Lemmon	Mount Lemmon Survey	·	3.2 km	MPC · JPL
477767	2011 AD_{28}	—	January 10, 2011	Kitt Peak	Spacewatch	V	580 m	MPC · JPL
477768	2011 AY_{37}	—	January 8, 2011	Mount Lemmon	Mount Lemmon Survey	·	540 m	MPC · JPL
477769	2011 AO_{39}	—	January 10, 2011	Mount Lemmon	Mount Lemmon Survey	·	480 m	MPC · JPL
477770	2011 AJ_{54}	—	January 3, 2011	Mount Lemmon	Mount Lemmon Survey	·	960 m	MPC · JPL
477771	2011 AR_{56}	—	December 22, 2003	Kitt Peak	Spacewatch	·	570 m	MPC · JPL
477772	2011 AK_{62}	—	September 16, 2009	Mount Lemmon	Mount Lemmon Survey	V	630 m	MPC · JPL
477773	2011 AS_{66}	—	December 8, 2010	Mount Lemmon	Mount Lemmon Survey	·	610 m	MPC · JPL
477774	2011 AU_{68}	—	December 9, 2010	Mount Lemmon	Mount Lemmon Survey	·	550 m	MPC · JPL
477775	2011 BR_{3}	—	February 10, 2008	Kitt Peak	Spacewatch	·	560 m	MPC · JPL
477776	2011 BS_{4}	—	April 7, 2008	Kitt Peak	Spacewatch	·	970 m	MPC · JPL
477777	2011 BP_{8}	—	February 7, 2008	Kitt Peak	Spacewatch	·	510 m	MPC · JPL
477778	2011 BK_{26}	—	November 24, 2003	Kitt Peak	Spacewatch	·	660 m	MPC · JPL
477779	2011 BQ_{26}	—	November 15, 2010	Mount Lemmon	Mount Lemmon Survey	·	710 m	MPC · JPL
477780	2011 BE_{33}	—	January 14, 2011	Kitt Peak	Spacewatch	·	700 m	MPC · JPL
477781	2011 BD_{36}	—	February 10, 2008	Mount Lemmon	Mount Lemmon Survey	·	610 m	MPC · JPL
477782	2011 BY_{40}	—	February 4, 1995	Kitt Peak	Spacewatch	3:2 · SHU	4.6 km	MPC · JPL
477783	2011 BV_{51}	—	October 3, 2003	Kitt Peak	Spacewatch	·	690 m	MPC · JPL
477784	2011 BD_{54}	—	November 14, 2006	Mount Lemmon	Mount Lemmon Survey	·	730 m	MPC · JPL
477785	2011 BZ_{56}	—	March 28, 2008	Mount Lemmon	Mount Lemmon Survey	V	580 m	MPC · JPL
477786	2011 BS_{57}	—	January 12, 2011	Kitt Peak	Spacewatch	·	1.2 km	MPC · JPL
477787	2011 BU_{70}	—	November 20, 2009	Kitt Peak	Spacewatch	3:2	4.2 km	MPC · JPL
477788	2011 BJ_{76}	—	January 28, 2011	Kitt Peak	Spacewatch	·	1.1 km	MPC · JPL
477789	2011 BW_{86}	—	January 5, 2011	Mount Lemmon	Mount Lemmon Survey	NYS	1.0 km	MPC · JPL
477790	2011 BM_{93}	—	January 28, 2011	Mount Lemmon	Mount Lemmon Survey	·	510 m	MPC · JPL
477791	2011 BL_{103}	—	January 27, 2011	Kitt Peak	Spacewatch	PHO	960 m	MPC · JPL
477792	2011 BS_{104}	—	January 28, 2011	Kitt Peak	Spacewatch	V	510 m	MPC · JPL
477793	2011 BP_{108}	—	October 4, 2006	Mount Lemmon	Mount Lemmon Survey	·	580 m	MPC · JPL
477794	2011 BG_{112}	—	October 22, 2006	Catalina	CSS	·	600 m	MPC · JPL
477795	2011 CZ_{33}	—	January 23, 2011	Mount Lemmon	Mount Lemmon Survey	3:2	4.8 km	MPC · JPL
477796	2011 CQ_{46}	—	November 19, 2006	Kitt Peak	Spacewatch	·	1.4 km	MPC · JPL
477797	2011 CJ_{55}	—	November 14, 2006	Mount Lemmon	Mount Lemmon Survey	·	650 m	MPC · JPL
477798	2011 CM_{67}	—	September 16, 2009	Mount Lemmon	Mount Lemmon Survey	·	780 m	MPC · JPL
477799	2011 CH_{77}	—	March 28, 2008	Mount Lemmon	Mount Lemmon Survey	·	600 m	MPC · JPL
477800	2011 CY_{80}	—	November 23, 2006	Mount Lemmon	Mount Lemmon Survey	·	860 m	MPC · JPL

== 477801–477900 ==
back to top

Designation			Discovery			Properties		Ref
Permanent	Provisional	Named after	Date	Site	Discoverer(s)	Category	Diam.	Ref
477801	2011 CU_{85}	—	October 20, 2006	Kitt Peak	Spacewatch	·	590 m	MPC · JPL
477802	2011 CB_{91}	—	January 24, 2007	Mount Lemmon	Mount Lemmon Survey	·	1.2 km	MPC · JPL
477803	2011 CQ_{91}	—	September 3, 2008	Kitt Peak	Spacewatch	3:2	5.2 km	MPC · JPL
477804	2011 CK_{103}	—	February 3, 2000	Kitt Peak	Spacewatch	·	1.1 km	MPC · JPL
477805	2011 CE_{116}	—	July 1, 2008	Kitt Peak	Spacewatch	NYS	870 m	MPC · JPL
477806	2011 DA_{5}	—	November 19, 2006	Kitt Peak	Spacewatch	·	1.4 km	MPC · JPL
477807	2011 DC_{9}	—	March 14, 2004	Socorro	LINEAR	·	1.4 km	MPC · JPL
477808	2011 DY_{9}	—	March 17, 2004	Kitt Peak	Spacewatch	·	650 m	MPC · JPL
477809	2011 DX_{17}	—	March 20, 2004	Kitt Peak	Spacewatch	·	900 m	MPC · JPL
477810	2011 DX_{23}	—	December 9, 2006	Kitt Peak	Spacewatch	·	750 m	MPC · JPL
477811	2011 DH_{44}	—	September 17, 2009	Mount Lemmon	Mount Lemmon Survey	·	780 m	MPC · JPL
477812	2011 DV_{47}	—	January 11, 2011	Mount Lemmon	Mount Lemmon Survey	·	980 m	MPC · JPL
477813	2011 EA_{3}	—	October 15, 2009	Mount Lemmon	Mount Lemmon Survey	·	830 m	MPC · JPL
477814	2011 EX_{6}	—	September 29, 2009	Kitt Peak	Spacewatch	·	830 m	MPC · JPL
477815	2011 ED_{9}	—	March 2, 2011	Kitt Peak	Spacewatch	·	950 m	MPC · JPL
477816	2011 EE_{21}	—	November 9, 2009	Mount Lemmon	Mount Lemmon Survey	3:2	5.2 km	MPC · JPL
477817	2011 EY_{25}	—	April 24, 2004	Kitt Peak	Spacewatch	·	1.3 km	MPC · JPL
477818	2011 EP_{26}	—	February 23, 2011	Kitt Peak	Spacewatch	·	750 m	MPC · JPL
477819	2011 EA_{32}	—	February 25, 2011	Mount Lemmon	Mount Lemmon Survey	·	1.1 km	MPC · JPL
477820	2011 EC_{36}	—	October 21, 2009	Mount Lemmon	Mount Lemmon Survey	·	840 m	MPC · JPL
477821	2011 EH_{36}	—	August 28, 2005	Kitt Peak	Spacewatch	·	1.3 km	MPC · JPL
477822	2011 EB_{37}	—	August 20, 2009	Kitt Peak	Spacewatch	(2076)	680 m	MPC · JPL
477823	2011 EC_{42}	—	February 25, 2011	Kitt Peak	Spacewatch	V	770 m	MPC · JPL
477824	2011 EA_{45}	—	February 25, 2011	Kitt Peak	Spacewatch	·	970 m	MPC · JPL
477825	2011 EL_{50}	—	November 19, 2006	Catalina	CSS	·	800 m	MPC · JPL
477826	2011 EB_{51}	—	August 4, 2003	Socorro	LINEAR	·	1.6 km	MPC · JPL
477827	2011 EU_{52}	—	January 11, 2011	Mount Lemmon	Mount Lemmon Survey	·	1.6 km	MPC · JPL
477828	2011 EW_{60}	—	March 5, 2011	Catalina	CSS	·	1.2 km	MPC · JPL
477829	2011 EJ_{67}	—	March 18, 2004	Socorro	LINEAR	·	820 m	MPC · JPL
477830	2011 EG_{69}	—	December 8, 1999	Kitt Peak	Spacewatch	·	780 m	MPC · JPL
477831	2011 EL_{71}	—	November 4, 2002	Kitt Peak	Spacewatch	V	630 m	MPC · JPL
477832	2011 EW_{75}	—	September 27, 2009	Kitt Peak	Spacewatch	·	780 m	MPC · JPL
477833	2011 ET_{85}	—	December 12, 2006	Kitt Peak	Spacewatch	·	1.0 km	MPC · JPL
477834	2011 FZ_{4}	—	March 13, 2007	Mount Lemmon	Mount Lemmon Survey	PHO	830 m	MPC · JPL
477835	2011 FH_{6}	—	December 16, 2006	Kitt Peak	Spacewatch	·	850 m	MPC · JPL
477836	2011 FF_{7}	—	September 28, 2009	Kitt Peak	Spacewatch	·	1.0 km	MPC · JPL
477837	2011 FN_{19}	—	March 9, 2011	Kitt Peak	Spacewatch	·	1.2 km	MPC · JPL
477838	2011 FR_{36}	—	November 19, 2009	Mount Lemmon	Mount Lemmon Survey	·	1.1 km	MPC · JPL
477839	2011 FL_{40}	—	October 12, 2005	Kitt Peak	Spacewatch	·	1.1 km	MPC · JPL
477840	2011 FX_{40}	—	January 26, 2007	Kitt Peak	Spacewatch	·	860 m	MPC · JPL
477841	2011 FS_{45}	—	November 27, 2006	Mount Lemmon	Mount Lemmon Survey	·	970 m	MPC · JPL
477842	2011 FL_{55}	—	January 16, 2007	Catalina	CSS	·	1.5 km	MPC · JPL
477843	2011 FJ_{70}	—	February 9, 2007	Catalina	CSS	·	1.3 km	MPC · JPL
477844	2011 FO_{76}	—	March 2, 2011	Kitt Peak	Spacewatch	·	1.0 km	MPC · JPL
477845	2011 FJ_{81}	—	March 29, 2004	Kitt Peak	Spacewatch	·	810 m	MPC · JPL
477846	2011 FY_{100}	—	September 17, 2009	Mount Lemmon	Mount Lemmon Survey	·	550 m	MPC · JPL
477847	2011 FH_{129}	—	March 16, 2007	Catalina	CSS	·	1.3 km	MPC · JPL
477848	2011 FJ_{137}	—	September 30, 1999	Kitt Peak	Spacewatch	·	620 m	MPC · JPL
477849	2011 FH_{152}	—	August 11, 2007	Siding Spring	SSS	·	530 m	MPC · JPL
477850	2011 FC_{153}	—	February 8, 2011	Mount Lemmon	Mount Lemmon Survey	·	1 km	MPC · JPL
477851	2011 GT_{27}	—	January 27, 2007	Mount Lemmon	Mount Lemmon Survey	PHO	880 m	MPC · JPL
477852	2011 GZ_{28}	—	March 13, 2011	Kitt Peak	Spacewatch	·	1.6 km	MPC · JPL
477853	2011 GN_{36}	—	April 14, 2004	Kitt Peak	Spacewatch	·	730 m	MPC · JPL
477854	2011 GJ_{47}	—	April 2, 2011	Kitt Peak	Spacewatch	·	1.5 km	MPC · JPL
477855	2011 GR_{48}	—	March 9, 2007	Mount Lemmon	Mount Lemmon Survey	·	840 m	MPC · JPL
477856	2011 GC_{49}	—	October 9, 2008	Mount Lemmon	Mount Lemmon Survey	RAF	680 m	MPC · JPL
477857	2011 GQ_{49}	—	February 23, 2007	Kitt Peak	Spacewatch	·	1.0 km	MPC · JPL
477858	2011 GV_{57}	—	March 14, 2011	Catalina	CSS	·	1.7 km	MPC · JPL
477859	2011 GU_{58}	—	April 1, 2011	Kitt Peak	Spacewatch	KON	1.9 km	MPC · JPL
477860	2011 GH_{61}	—	March 26, 2011	Mount Lemmon	Mount Lemmon Survey	·	1.2 km	MPC · JPL
477861	2011 GE_{69}	—	January 24, 2011	Kitt Peak	Spacewatch	PHO	1.2 km	MPC · JPL
477862	2011 HD_{10}	—	April 12, 1997	Kitt Peak	Spacewatch	·	920 m	MPC · JPL
477863	2011 HM_{10}	—	March 2, 2011	Kitt Peak	Spacewatch	·	640 m	MPC · JPL
477864	2011 HE_{12}	—	December 24, 2005	Kitt Peak	Spacewatch	·	1.4 km	MPC · JPL
477865	2011 HC_{21}	—	April 24, 2011	Mount Lemmon	Mount Lemmon Survey	·	1 km	MPC · JPL
477866	2011 HN_{22}	—	March 28, 2011	Kitt Peak	Spacewatch	·	1.3 km	MPC · JPL
477867	2011 HY_{24}	—	April 27, 2011	Kitt Peak	Spacewatch	·	1.2 km	MPC · JPL
477868	2011 HV_{25}	—	March 14, 2007	Mount Lemmon	Mount Lemmon Survey	·	1.3 km	MPC · JPL
477869	2011 HZ_{30}	—	April 23, 2011	Kitt Peak	Spacewatch	V	820 m	MPC · JPL
477870	2011 HO_{37}	—	April 27, 2011	Kitt Peak	Spacewatch	·	1.9 km	MPC · JPL
477871	2011 HC_{40}	—	April 11, 2011	Mount Lemmon	Mount Lemmon Survey	·	1.3 km	MPC · JPL
477872	2011 HC_{42}	—	April 1, 2010	WISE	WISE	·	2.7 km	MPC · JPL
477873	2011 HZ_{49}	—	February 11, 2011	Mount Lemmon	Mount Lemmon Survey	·	1.3 km	MPC · JPL
477874	2011 HN_{52}	—	April 26, 2011	Kitt Peak	Spacewatch	EUN	1.1 km	MPC · JPL
477875	2011 HD_{56}	—	April 13, 2011	Kitt Peak	Spacewatch	·	1.3 km	MPC · JPL
477876	2011 HO_{56}	—	March 27, 2011	Kitt Peak	Spacewatch	·	1.1 km	MPC · JPL
477877	2011 HE_{64}	—	April 22, 2011	Kitt Peak	Spacewatch	ADE	1.5 km	MPC · JPL
477878	2011 HW_{65}	—	December 21, 2006	Mount Lemmon	Mount Lemmon Survey	·	990 m	MPC · JPL
477879	2011 HC_{66}	—	April 23, 1998	Kitt Peak	Spacewatch	·	1.3 km	MPC · JPL
477880	2011 HX_{66}	—	April 23, 2011	Kitt Peak	Spacewatch	·	1.1 km	MPC · JPL
477881	2011 HA_{80}	—	April 30, 2011	Kitt Peak	Spacewatch	RAF	730 m	MPC · JPL
477882	2011 HS_{84}	—	November 5, 2005	Kitt Peak	Spacewatch	·	1.4 km	MPC · JPL
477883	2011 HQ_{97}	—	July 30, 2008	Mount Lemmon	Mount Lemmon Survey	V	720 m	MPC · JPL
477884	2011 JO_{6}	—	November 22, 2005	Kitt Peak	Spacewatch	·	1.1 km	MPC · JPL
477885	2011 JT_{9}	—	April 6, 2011	Catalina	CSS	AMO +1km	1.3 km	MPC · JPL
477886	2011 JA_{13}	—	May 7, 2011	Kitt Peak	Spacewatch	·	1.9 km	MPC · JPL
477887	2011 JS_{13}	—	April 27, 2011	Kitt Peak	Spacewatch	MAR	970 m	MPC · JPL
477888	2011 JX_{17}	—	April 30, 2011	Kitt Peak	Spacewatch	·	1.3 km	MPC · JPL
477889	2011 JX_{20}	—	May 7, 2011	Kitt Peak	Spacewatch	V	590 m	MPC · JPL
477890	2011 JP_{21}	—	April 22, 2007	Mount Lemmon	Mount Lemmon Survey	·	990 m	MPC · JPL
477891	2011 JH_{22}	—	April 22, 2011	Kitt Peak	Spacewatch	ADE	1.6 km	MPC · JPL
477892	2011 JE_{27}	—	January 7, 2010	Mount Lemmon	Mount Lemmon Survey	JUN	990 m	MPC · JPL
477893	2011 KL_{1}	—	April 23, 2011	Kitt Peak	Spacewatch	·	1.8 km	MPC · JPL
477894	2011 KW_{3}	—	April 5, 2011	Mount Lemmon	Mount Lemmon Survey	·	1.3 km	MPC · JPL
477895	2011 KU_{4}	—	May 5, 2011	Mount Lemmon	Mount Lemmon Survey	·	1.3 km	MPC · JPL
477896	2011 KB_{6}	—	May 8, 2011	Catalina	CSS	·	1.2 km	MPC · JPL
477897	2011 KP_{6}	—	April 30, 2011	Mount Lemmon	Mount Lemmon Survey	·	1.5 km	MPC · JPL
477898	2011 KM_{9}	—	December 18, 2009	Mount Lemmon	Mount Lemmon Survey	·	3.4 km	MPC · JPL
477899	2011 KP_{11}	—	May 8, 2011	Catalina	CSS	·	1.7 km	MPC · JPL
477900	2011 KX_{11}	—	April 4, 2010	WISE	WISE	·	4.0 km	MPC · JPL

== 477901–478000 ==
back to top

Designation			Discovery			Properties		Ref
Permanent	Provisional	Named after	Date	Site	Discoverer(s)	Category	Diam.	Ref
477901	2011 KL_{23}	—	April 5, 2011	Mount Lemmon	Mount Lemmon Survey	·	1.1 km	MPC · JPL
477902	2011 KT_{24}	—	October 31, 2005	Kitt Peak	Spacewatch	·	1.4 km	MPC · JPL
477903	2011 KF_{27}	—	February 26, 2010	WISE	WISE	·	2.5 km	MPC · JPL
477904	2011 KQ_{27}	—	May 22, 2011	Mount Lemmon	Mount Lemmon Survey	·	1.3 km	MPC · JPL
477905	2011 KX_{29}	—	May 22, 2011	Mount Lemmon	Mount Lemmon Survey	·	970 m	MPC · JPL
477906	2011 KY_{30}	—	May 24, 2011	Mount Lemmon	Mount Lemmon Survey	·	1.4 km	MPC · JPL
477907	2011 KW_{32}	—	May 24, 2011	Mount Lemmon	Mount Lemmon Survey	·	1.7 km	MPC · JPL
477908	2011 KS_{45}	—	May 21, 2011	Kitt Peak	Spacewatch	·	1.1 km	MPC · JPL
477909	2011 LF_{4}	—	May 5, 2011	Mount Lemmon	Mount Lemmon Survey	·	1.2 km	MPC · JPL
477910	2011 LF_{6}	—	March 12, 2007	Kitt Peak	Spacewatch	·	1.1 km	MPC · JPL
477911	2011 LY_{10}	—	April 2, 2011	Mount Lemmon	Mount Lemmon Survey	·	1.8 km	MPC · JPL
477912	2011 LO_{17}	—	September 17, 2006	Catalina	CSS	·	1.5 km	MPC · JPL
477913	2011 LG_{25}	—	May 23, 2011	Mount Lemmon	Mount Lemmon Survey	RAF	860 m	MPC · JPL
477914	2011 ML_{5}	—	December 1, 2008	Kitt Peak	Spacewatch	·	2.2 km	MPC · JPL
477915	2011 NO	—	May 3, 1994	Kitt Peak	Spacewatch	(194)	1.6 km	MPC · JPL
477916	2011 OE_{1}	—	July 1, 2011	Mount Lemmon	Mount Lemmon Survey	·	1.5 km	MPC · JPL
477917	2011 OK_{1}	—	July 2, 2011	Siding Spring	SSS	·	2.2 km	MPC · JPL
477918	2011 PK_{2}	—	January 27, 2003	Socorro	LINEAR	·	2.9 km	MPC · JPL
477919	2011 PR_{8}	—	August 27, 2006	Kitt Peak	Spacewatch	·	2.4 km	MPC · JPL
477920	2011 PO_{13}	—	August 6, 2002	Campo Imperatore	CINEOS	·	2.2 km	MPC · JPL
477921	2011 QN_{10}	—	January 18, 2009	Kitt Peak	Spacewatch	·	2.0 km	MPC · JPL
477922	2011 QY_{18}	—	April 20, 2006	Kitt Peak	Spacewatch	·	1.8 km	MPC · JPL
477923	2011 QV_{23}	—	February 20, 2009	Kitt Peak	Spacewatch	·	2.1 km	MPC · JPL
477924	2011 QQ_{24}	—	January 16, 2009	Kitt Peak	Spacewatch	·	2.1 km	MPC · JPL
477925	2011 QK_{29}	—	August 21, 2006	Kitt Peak	Spacewatch	·	1.9 km	MPC · JPL
477926	2011 QL_{36}	—	October 20, 2007	Mount Lemmon	Mount Lemmon Survey	HOF	2.4 km	MPC · JPL
477927	2011 QG_{46}	—	September 20, 2006	Catalina	CSS	H	670 m	MPC · JPL
477928	2011 QS_{48}	—	July 12, 2010	WISE	WISE	·	2.4 km	MPC · JPL
477929	2011 QM_{55}	—	November 9, 2007	Mount Lemmon	Mount Lemmon Survey	·	2.5 km	MPC · JPL
477930	2011 QZ_{57}	—	October 20, 2006	Kitt Peak	Spacewatch	EOS	1.6 km	MPC · JPL
477931	2011 QX_{58}	—	December 22, 2008	Kitt Peak	Spacewatch	GEF	2.4 km	MPC · JPL
477932	2011 QN_{62}	—	January 30, 2009	Kitt Peak	Spacewatch	·	2.0 km	MPC · JPL
477933	2011 QZ_{63}	—	December 21, 2008	Mount Lemmon	Mount Lemmon Survey	·	1.7 km	MPC · JPL
477934	2011 QC_{67}	—	September 27, 2000	Socorro	LINEAR	·	4.1 km	MPC · JPL
477935	2011 QD_{74}	—	October 17, 2001	Kitt Peak	Spacewatch	·	1.8 km	MPC · JPL
477936	2011 QQ_{74}	—	January 30, 2004	Kitt Peak	Spacewatch	AGN	970 m	MPC · JPL
477937	2011 QU_{78}	—	February 22, 2009	Mount Lemmon	Mount Lemmon Survey	·	2.1 km	MPC · JPL
477938	2011 QM_{82}	—	March 18, 2004	Kitt Peak	Spacewatch	·	2.3 km	MPC · JPL
477939	2011 QH_{83}	—	January 29, 2009	Mount Lemmon	Mount Lemmon Survey	·	2.3 km	MPC · JPL
477940	2011 QF_{88}	—	November 14, 2001	Kitt Peak	Spacewatch	·	1.4 km	MPC · JPL
477941	2011 QM_{88}	—	August 27, 2006	Kitt Peak	Spacewatch	KOR	1.4 km	MPC · JPL
477942	2011 QJ_{93}	—	February 1, 2009	Kitt Peak	Spacewatch	·	2.3 km	MPC · JPL
477943	2011 QH_{94}	—	January 1, 2008	Kitt Peak	Spacewatch	·	2.0 km	MPC · JPL
477944	2011 QQ_{94}	—	December 17, 2007	Mount Lemmon	Mount Lemmon Survey	DOR	1.8 km	MPC · JPL
477945	2011 QV_{94}	—	December 31, 2007	Kitt Peak	Spacewatch	·	3.0 km	MPC · JPL
477946	2011 QY_{94}	—	May 4, 2005	Mount Lemmon	Mount Lemmon Survey	·	1.7 km	MPC · JPL
477947	2011 QB_{97}	—	February 1, 2009	Kitt Peak	Spacewatch	HOF	2.6 km	MPC · JPL
477948	2011 QF_{98}	—	August 28, 2011	Siding Spring	SSS	·	2.9 km	MPC · JPL
477949	2011 RM_{4}	—	September 7, 2011	Kitt Peak	Spacewatch	KOR	1.5 km	MPC · JPL
477950	2011 RT_{11}	—	November 14, 2006	Catalina	CSS	·	3.0 km	MPC · JPL
477951	2011 RE_{12}	—	September 14, 2006	Kitt Peak	Spacewatch	·	2.3 km	MPC · JPL
477952	2011 RL_{12}	—	March 3, 2009	Mount Lemmon	Mount Lemmon Survey	·	2.2 km	MPC · JPL
477953	2011 RX_{12}	—	October 10, 2007	Mount Lemmon	Mount Lemmon Survey	·	1.7 km	MPC · JPL
477954	2011 RW_{15}	—	March 10, 2005	Anderson Mesa	LONEOS	·	2.1 km	MPC · JPL
477955	2011 RS_{17}	—	October 15, 2006	Kitt Peak	Spacewatch	EOS	1.7 km	MPC · JPL
477956	2011 RT_{18}	—	September 8, 2011	Kitt Peak	Spacewatch	·	2.4 km	MPC · JPL
477957	2011 SF_{5}	—	August 29, 2006	Kitt Peak	Spacewatch	KOR	1.4 km	MPC · JPL
477958	2011 SG_{9}	—	April 2, 2005	Mount Lemmon	Mount Lemmon Survey	·	2.4 km	MPC · JPL
477959	2011 SU_{11}	—	December 17, 2007	Mount Lemmon	Mount Lemmon Survey	·	1.8 km	MPC · JPL
477960	2011 SB_{23}	—	August 28, 2006	Kitt Peak	Spacewatch	KOR	1.3 km	MPC · JPL
477961	2011 SX_{33}	—	September 18, 2011	Mount Lemmon	Mount Lemmon Survey	THM	2.1 km	MPC · JPL
477962	2011 SA_{34}	—	March 4, 2005	Socorro	LINEAR	H	510 m	MPC · JPL
477963	2011 SG_{35}	—	September 20, 2011	Kitt Peak	Spacewatch	VER	2.7 km	MPC · JPL
477964	2011 SL_{37}	—	March 2, 2008	Catalina	CSS	·	3.9 km	MPC · JPL
477965	2011 SH_{42}	—	October 27, 2006	Mount Lemmon	Mount Lemmon Survey	·	2.3 km	MPC · JPL
477966	2011 SF_{45}	—	January 11, 2008	Kitt Peak	Spacewatch	VER	2.8 km	MPC · JPL
477967	2011 SW_{47}	—	October 18, 2006	Kitt Peak	Spacewatch	·	1.8 km	MPC · JPL
477968	2011 SE_{51}	—	January 11, 2008	Mount Lemmon	Mount Lemmon Survey	·	3.9 km	MPC · JPL
477969	2011 SV_{52}	—	January 18, 2008	Mount Lemmon	Mount Lemmon Survey	EOS	1.6 km	MPC · JPL
477970	2011 SZ_{52}	—	September 8, 2011	Kitt Peak	Spacewatch	·	2.4 km	MPC · JPL
477971	2011 SL_{64}	—	May 28, 2011	Mount Lemmon	Mount Lemmon Survey	·	1.6 km	MPC · JPL
477972	2011 SE_{65}	—	October 19, 2006	Mount Lemmon	Mount Lemmon Survey	EOS	2.3 km	MPC · JPL
477973	2011 SH_{65}	—	January 30, 2008	Mount Lemmon	Mount Lemmon Survey	·	2.6 km	MPC · JPL
477974	2011 SL_{68}	—	September 24, 2011	Catalina	CSS	H	540 m	MPC · JPL
477975	2011 ST_{76}	—	August 28, 2006	Kitt Peak	Spacewatch	·	1.6 km	MPC · JPL
477976	2011 SJ_{78}	—	August 21, 2006	Kitt Peak	Spacewatch	·	1.6 km	MPC · JPL
477977	2011 SJ_{82}	—	July 1, 2011	Mount Lemmon	Mount Lemmon Survey	·	2.6 km	MPC · JPL
477978	2011 SL_{83}	—	September 21, 2011	Kitt Peak	Spacewatch	·	2.5 km	MPC · JPL
477979	2011 SK_{85}	—	May 6, 2005	Mount Lemmon	Mount Lemmon Survey	H	560 m	MPC · JPL
477980	2011 SN_{85}	—	September 21, 2011	Kitt Peak	Spacewatch	·	2.1 km	MPC · JPL
477981	2011 SN_{89}	—	September 22, 2011	Kitt Peak	Spacewatch	EOS	2.2 km	MPC · JPL
477982	2011 SF_{91}	—	September 22, 2011	Kitt Peak	Spacewatch	·	2.7 km	MPC · JPL
477983	2011 SY_{93}	—	April 14, 2008	Mount Lemmon	Mount Lemmon Survey	·	2.8 km	MPC · JPL
477984	2011 SU_{95}	—	January 1, 2008	Kitt Peak	Spacewatch	·	1.5 km	MPC · JPL
477985	2011 SE_{99}	—	September 8, 2011	Kitt Peak	Spacewatch	·	1.6 km	MPC · JPL
477986	2011 SN_{101}	—	August 27, 2006	Kitt Peak	Spacewatch	KOR	1.2 km	MPC · JPL
477987	2011 SY_{104}	—	September 23, 2011	Kitt Peak	Spacewatch	BRA	1.3 km	MPC · JPL
477988	2011 SG_{107}	—	September 24, 2011	Mount Lemmon	Mount Lemmon Survey	·	3.0 km	MPC · JPL
477989	2011 SW_{109}	—	March 14, 2004	Kitt Peak	Spacewatch	·	1.8 km	MPC · JPL
477990	2011 SB_{116}	—	October 9, 2002	Socorro	LINEAR	DOR	2.3 km	MPC · JPL
477991	2011 SX_{117}	—	February 26, 2009	Kitt Peak	Spacewatch	·	2.1 km	MPC · JPL
477992	2011 SL_{124}	—	August 29, 2006	Kitt Peak	Spacewatch	HOF	2.4 km	MPC · JPL
477993	2011 SB_{127}	—	October 22, 1995	Kitt Peak	Spacewatch	·	2.0 km	MPC · JPL
477994	2011 SM_{127}	—	September 20, 2011	Kitt Peak	Spacewatch	·	2.5 km	MPC · JPL
477995	2011 SC_{132}	—	September 23, 2011	Kitt Peak	Spacewatch	·	3.3 km	MPC · JPL
477996	2011 SA_{134}	—	September 30, 2006	Mount Lemmon	Mount Lemmon Survey	·	1.7 km	MPC · JPL
477997	2011 SO_{134}	—	October 2, 2006	Mount Lemmon	Mount Lemmon Survey	TEL	1.1 km	MPC · JPL
477998	2011 SH_{137}	—	December 19, 2007	Mount Lemmon	Mount Lemmon Survey	·	3.2 km	MPC · JPL
477999	2011 SF_{138}	—	September 8, 2011	Kitt Peak	Spacewatch	·	1.9 km	MPC · JPL
478000	2011 SG_{139}	—	September 22, 1995	Kitt Peak	Spacewatch	·	1.4 km	MPC · JPL

back to top
