= List of named minor planets: 400000–499999 =

This is a partial list of named minor planets in numerical order. It contains a total of 232 entries as of 9 November 2026. Minor planets for which no article exist are displayed in grey color and redirect to the list of minor planets (see List of minor planets § Main index).

== From 400,000 to 499,999 ==
- 400072 Radviliškis
- 400162 SAIT
- 400193 Castión
- 400308 Antonkutter
- 400309 Ralfhofner
- 400673 Vitapolunina
- 400796 Douglass
- 400811 Gillesfontaine
- 400881 Vladimírdolinay
- 401820 Špilas
- 402008 Laborfalviróza
- 402841 Kamakawiwoʻole
- 402852 Picardie
- 402920 Tsawout
- 403491 Anthonygrayling
- 403563 Ledbetter
- 404016 Alexandralabenz
- 405207 Konstanz
- 405571 Erdőspál
- 406006 Ralys
- 406308 Nanwai
- 406737 Davet
- 406957 Kochetova
- 407016 Danielerdag
- 407041 Olganevskaya
- 407243 Krapivin
- 410475 Robertschulz
- 410619 Fabry
- 410817 Zaffino
- 410835 Neszmerak
- 410912 Lisakaroline
- 410928 Maidbronn
- 411717 Cherylreed
- 412536 Farquharson
- 412687 Shaxigao
- 413033 Aerts
- 413233 Várkonyiágnes
- 414026 Bochonko
- 414283 Lécureuil
- 416252 Manuelherrera
- 416273 Glennsnyder
- 416583 Jacereece
- 417955 Mallama
- 417978 Haslehner
- 418220 Kęstutis
- 418419 Lacanto
- 418532 Saruman
- 418689 Gema
- 418891 Vizi
- 419435 Tiramisu
- 419521 Meursault
- 419858 Abecheng
- 420356 Praamžius
- 420612 Nuptel
- 420779 Świdwin
- 421774 Jeffreyrose
- 423097 Richardjarrell
- 423205 Echezeaux
- 423380 Juhászárpád
- 423433 Harsányi
- 423624 Udeantioquia
- 423645 Quénisset
- 424200 Tonicelia
- 424613 Kraszewski
- 425442 Eberstadt
- 425509 Valyavin
- 426524 Rainerhannig
- 427496 van de Weg
- 427695 Johnpazder
- 428102 Rolandwagner
- 428259 Laphil
- 428351 Martinchalifour
- 428694 Saulė
- 429031 Hannavonhoerner
- 429032 Sebvonhoerner
- 429033 Günterwendt
- 429084 Dietrichrex
- 429120 Mikhaillavrov
- 429136 Corsali
- 429733 Gilbertbaker
- 431397 Carolinregina
- 431436 Gahberg
- 431803 Šventoji
- 432101 Ngari
- 432107 Reedspurling
- 432361 Rakovski
- 432971 Loving
- 433512 Hollyholman
- 433763 Helenkirk
- 434050 Törökfece
- 434180 Brosens
- 434325 Lautréamont
- 434453 Ayerdhal
- 434678 Curlin
- 434707 Oyfnpripetshik
- 435127 Virtelpro
- 435186 Jovellanos
- 435552 Morin
- 435728 Yunlin
- 435950 Bad Königshofen
- 436048 Fritzhuber
- 436149 Edabel
- 437192 Frederikolsen
- 438523 Figalli
- 438829 Visena
- 438881 Michaelkhan
- 438973 Masci
- 439718 Danielcervantes
- 440411 Piovani
- 440670 Bécassine
- 440794 Wytrzyszczak
- 440833 Kristenwalbolt
- 441374 Wangjingxiu
- 441563 Domanski
- 442721 Kerouac
- 444411 Lutherbeegle
- 444414 Mikehankey
- 444418 Rohitbhartia
- 444419 Francismccubbin
- 444562 Visaginas
- 445143 Jordisavall
- 445156 Cheeloomed
- 445308 Volov
- 445818 Ronbeck
- 445917 Ola
- 446500 Katrinraynor
- 446957 Priellekornélia
- 447682 Rambaldi
- 448051 Pepisensi
- 448988 Changzhong
- 449922 Bailey
- 450297 Csákánybéla
- 450390 Pitchcomment
- 450737 Sarbievius
- 450806 Mariamalibran
- 450931 Coculescu
- 451138 Rizvanov
- 452307 Manawydan
- 453256 Gucevičius
- 453715 Blakesullivan
- 454326 Donlee
- 454329 Ericpiquette
- 454350 Paolaamico
- 454352 Majidzandian
- 454409 Markusloose
- 454419 Hansklausreif
- 454505 Suntharalingam
- 455207 Kellyyoder
- 455739 Isabelita
- 455887 Laurafallon
- 456378 Akashikaikyo
- 456627 Cristianmartins
- 456677 Yepeijian
- 456695 Xingdingyu
- 456731 Uligrözinger
- 457248 Hondius
- 457303 Daina
- 457743 Balklavs
- 457818 Ramírezmoreta
- 458063 Gustavomuler
- 458123 Lydiabenecke
- 461650 Paisdezső
- 461981 Chuyouhua
- 462078 Carlosbriones
- 463368 Eurytus
- 464150 Kresken
- 464743 Stanislavkomárek
- 464745 Péterrózsa
- 465036 Tatm
- 465513 Chenchen
- 466552 Viking
- 468044 Lacatus
- 468581 Maiajasperwhite
- 468725 Khalat
- 469219 Kamoʻoalewa
- 469366 Watkins
- 469705 ǂKá̦gára
- 469748 Volnay
- 469773 Kitaibel
- 470324 Debbanci
- 470341 Panjianwei
- 470423 Endeavour
- 470600 Calogero
- 471109 Vladobahýl
- 471143 Dziewanna
- 471301 Robertajmolson
- 471325 Taowu
- 471926 Jörmungandr
- 472054 Tupaia
- 472235 Zhulong
- 473503 Minoruozima
- 474440 Nemesnagyágnes
- 474640 Alicanto
- 475080 Jarry
- 475696 Fisiocritico
- 475802 Zurek
- 479553 Garyzema
- 481984 Cernunnos
- 481993 Melaniezander
- 482101 Arizonacu
- 483454 Hosszúkatinka
- 483488 Wudeshi
- 483615 Martinmccarthy
- 483636 Treanor
- 483637 Johanstein
- 483951 Fiorella
- 484613 Cerebrito
- 484734 Chienshu
- 485320 Vértesernő
- 486170 Zolnowska
- 486239 Zosiakaczmarek
- 486416 Mami
- 486898 LaForge
- 486958 Arrokoth
- 487617 Ingethiering
- 487761 Frankbrandner
- 487884 Saoras
- 489603 Kurtschreckling
- 490628 Chassigny
- 491984 Brunapontes
- 492112 Jordicamarasa
- 492786 Ferdowsi
- 495181 Rogerwaters
- 495253 Hanszimmer
- 495287 Harari
- 495759 Jandesselberger
- 497593 Kejimkujik
- 497700 MacDougall
- 498394 Zhangbosheng
- 498797 Linshiawshin
- 499367 Monikasirp
- 499526 Romhányi
back to top

== See also ==
- List of minor planet discoverers
- List of observatory codes
- Meanings of minor planet names § Index
