= 420356 Praamžius =

Classical Kuiper belt object

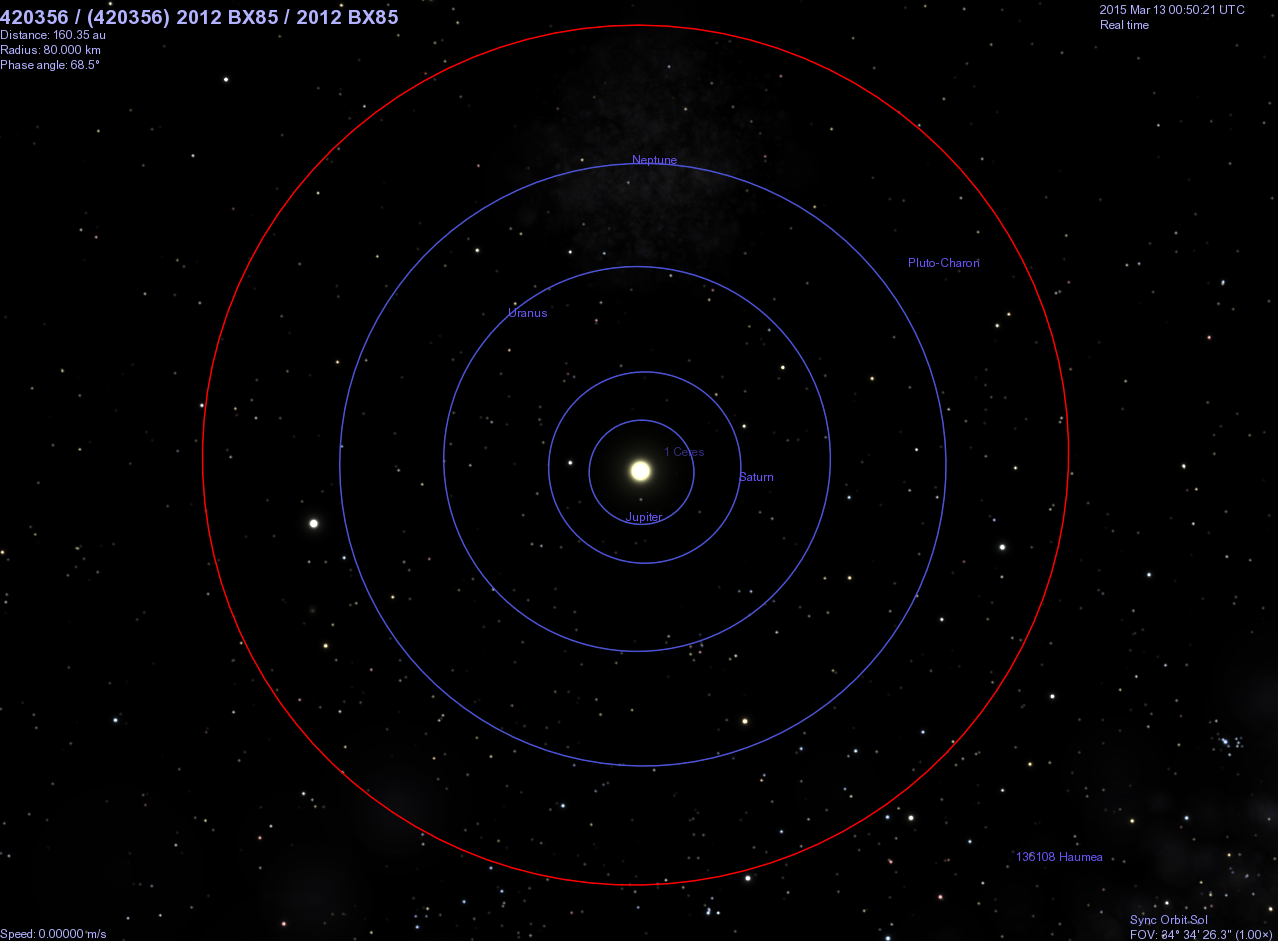
- A screenshot of Praamžius' orbit in Celestia.

Discovery
- Discovered by: K. Černis; R. P. Boyle
- Discovery site: VATT (Mount Graham Obs.)
- Discovery date: 23 January 2012

Designations
- Pronunciation: /preɪˈæmʒiəs/ (Lithuanian: [prɐˈâmʑʊs])
- Named after: Praámžius (Lithuanian mythology)
- Alternative designations: 2012 BX_{85}
- Minor planet category: TNO · cubewano cold · distant
- Adjectives: Praamžinian
- Symbol: (proposed)

Orbital characteristics
- Epoch 27 April 2019 (JD 2458600.5)
- Uncertainty parameter 3
- Observation arc: 13.08 yr (4,778 d)
- Aphelion: 43.027 AU
- Perihelion: 42.147 AU
- Semi-major axis: 42.587 AU
- Eccentricity: 0.0103
- Orbital period (sidereal): 277.93 yr (101,512 d)
- Mean anomaly: 185.10°
- Mean motion: 0° 0^{m} 12.6^{s} / day
- Inclination: 1.1001°
- Longitude of ascending node: 314.26°
- Time of perihelion: ≈ 12 June 2158 ±3 months
- Argument of perihelion: 358.38°
- Known satellites: 0

Physical characteristics
- Mean diameter: 191 km (est.); 241 km (est.)
- Geometric albedo: 0.09 (assumed); 0.20 (assumed)
- Apparent magnitude: 22.09 (visible)
- Absolute magnitude (H): 5.7

420356 Praamžius (provisional designation 2012 BX_{85}) is a trans-Neptunian object from the classical Kuiper belt, located in the outermost region of the Solar System, approximately 190–320 kilometers (120–200 miles) in diameter. It was discovered on 23 January 2012, by astronomers Kazimieras Černis and Richard Boyle with the Vatican's VATT at Mount Graham Observatory in Arizona, United States. The cold classical Kuiper belt object is possibly very red in color. It was named after the chief god Praamžius from Lithuanian mythology.

== Orbit and classification ==
Eccentricity at different Epochs
Epoch	Eccentricity	Refs
09 Dec 2014	0.0018	(Note: Archived JPL SBDB data sheet at epoch 14 December 2014 (solution date 8 January 2015).)
31 Jul 2016	0.0032	(Note: Archived MPC data sheet at epoch 31 July 2016.)
04 Apr 2019	0.0103	
01 Sep 2021	0.013	—
Barycentric	0.0078	—

Praamžius orbits the Sun at a distance of 42.1–43.0 AU once every 277 years and 11 months (101,512 days; semi-major axis of 42.59 AU). Its orbit has an eccentricity of 0.01 and an inclination of 1° with respect to the ecliptic. It is a classical Kuiper belt object located in between the resonant plutino (39.4 AU) and twotino (47.8 AU) populations and has a low-eccentricity orbit. With an inclination significantly less than 4–7°, it belongs to the cold rather than to the "stirred" hot population.

With an eccentricity of 0.003 in 2016, Praamžius had one of the lowest eccentricities of any trans-Neptunian object, and a more circular orbit than any major planet (including Venus, the least eccentric planet at 0.007). But the object's eccentricity varies over time due to the position of the planets (also see table). A 10 million year simulation of the orbit shows the eccentricity (emax) does not get greater than 0.03.

== Discovery ==
Initial discovery was from images acquired on 23 January 2012 at VATT, on Mount Graham, Arizona using a 1.8 meter reflecting telescope; precovery observations from VATT and the Sloan Digital Sky Survey dating back to 31 December 2002 have been accepted by the Minor Planet Center. The object has been repeatedly tracked through January 2016, mostly by VATT with some supporting observations by Las Campanas Observatory. Praamžius is one of the most recently discovered minor planets to receive a numeric designation, confirming it as a distinct body with a well determined orbit. This is due to the large number of observations since and indeed before its discovery: about one every 23 to 24 days on average from 2002 to 2016, and as many as one per 10 days in the period between discovery and assignment alone. Precovery images refined the orbit even more.

== Naming ==
This minor planet was named after Praamžius ("the Eternal One", an epithet of Dievas), the Lithuanian god of the sky, peace, and friendship. The official naming citation was published by the Minor Planet Center on 22 February 2016 (M.P.C. 98717), though the name was initially spelled "Praamzius". On 4 May 2026, the International Astronomical Union's Working Group for Small Body Nomenclature changed the name from "Praamzius" to "Praamžius".

== Physical characteristics ==
According to Johnston's Archive, Praamžius measures 321 kilometers in diameter based on an assumed, generic albedo of 0.09. This would qualify the object as a weak dwarf planet candidate based on the 5-class taxonomic system of American astronomer Michael Brown. However, on his website, Brown estimates only a diameter of 191 kilometers due to a much higher (assumed) albedo of 0.20. As a consequence, he no longer considers Praamžius to be a possible dwarf planet.

As of 2018, neither the body's color indices, nor its rotational lightcurve has been obtained from photometric observations, and its rotation period, pole and shape remain unknown.
