= List of minor planets: 420001–421000 =

The following is a partial list of minor planets, running from minor-planet number 420001 through 421000, inclusive. The primary data for this and other partial lists is based on JPL's "Small-Body Orbital Elements" and data available from the Minor Planet Center. Critical list information is also provided by the MPC, unless otherwise specified from Lowell Observatory. A detailed description of the table's columns and additional sources are given on the main page including a complete list of every page in this series, and a statistical break-up on the dynamical classification of minor planets.

Also see the summary list of all named bodies in numerical and alphabetical order, and the corresponding naming citations for the number range of this particular list. New namings may only be added to this list after official publication, as the preannouncement of names is condemned by the Working Group for Small Bodies Nomenclature of the International Astronomical Union.

Near-Earth obj.	MBA (inner)	MBA (outer)	Centaur
Mars-crosser	MBA (middle)	Jupiter trojan	Trans-Neptunian obj.
Unclassified

== 420001–420100 ==
Designation			Discovery			Properties		Ref
Permanent	Provisional	Named after	Date	Site	Discoverer(s)	Category	Diam.	Ref
420001	2011 CN_{47}	—	January 30, 2011	Mount Lemmon	Mount Lemmon Survey	·	1.5 km	MPC · JPL
420002	2011 CV_{47}	—	March 31, 2007	Palomar	NEAT	·	1.9 km	MPC · JPL
420003	2011 CT_{48}	—	September 14, 2009	Catalina	CSS	·	2.2 km	MPC · JPL
420004	2011 CP_{49}	—	December 1, 2005	Kitt Peak	Spacewatch	PAD	1.4 km	MPC · JPL
420005	2011 CX_{51}	—	September 16, 2009	Kitt Peak	Spacewatch	·	1.8 km	MPC · JPL
420006	2011 CR_{53}	—	December 19, 2004	Kitt Peak	Spacewatch	·	3.5 km	MPC · JPL
420007	2011 CB_{61}	—	January 28, 2011	Mount Lemmon	Mount Lemmon Survey	·	2.2 km	MPC · JPL
420008	2011 CJ_{64}	—	September 6, 2008	Mount Lemmon	Mount Lemmon Survey	·	2.3 km	MPC · JPL
420009	2011 CD_{67}	—	August 23, 2004	Kitt Peak	Spacewatch	·	1.6 km	MPC · JPL
420010	2011 CP_{67}	—	September 3, 2000	Apache Point	SDSS	·	1.7 km	MPC · JPL
420011	2011 CX_{69}	—	January 17, 2007	Palomar	NEAT	·	1.3 km	MPC · JPL
420012	2011 CX_{71}	—	March 11, 2007	Kitt Peak	Spacewatch	WIT	1.0 km	MPC · JPL
420013	2011 CK_{72}	—	November 11, 2010	Kitt Peak	Spacewatch	·	1.4 km	MPC · JPL
420014	2011 CS_{73}	—	April 29, 2003	Haleakala	NEAT	·	1.4 km	MPC · JPL
420015	2011 CQ_{74}	—	November 16, 2010	Mount Lemmon	Mount Lemmon Survey	MRX	1.4 km	MPC · JPL
420016	2011 CS_{74}	—	April 7, 2003	Kitt Peak	Spacewatch	(5)	1.2 km	MPC · JPL
420017	2011 CU_{75}	—	April 10, 2000	Anderson Mesa	LONEOS	·	3.5 km	MPC · JPL
420018	2011 CC_{76}	—	November 26, 2005	Catalina	CSS	JUN	1.4 km	MPC · JPL
420019	2011 CE_{78}	—	October 17, 2003	Kitt Peak	Spacewatch	·	2.1 km	MPC · JPL
420020	2011 CX_{81}	—	February 3, 2010	WISE	WISE	·	3.0 km	MPC · JPL
420021	2011 CY_{86}	—	September 22, 2003	Kitt Peak	Spacewatch	·	2.3 km	MPC · JPL
420022	2011 CC_{87}	—	December 29, 2005	Mount Lemmon	Mount Lemmon Survey	NEM	2.5 km	MPC · JPL
420023	2011 CA_{90}	—	November 19, 2009	Kitt Peak	Spacewatch	·	2.2 km	MPC · JPL
420024	2011 CE_{91}	—	November 20, 2003	Kitt Peak	Spacewatch	VER	2.4 km	MPC · JPL
420025	2011 CA_{93}	—	September 21, 2009	Mount Lemmon	Mount Lemmon Survey	·	1.6 km	MPC · JPL
420026	2011 CU_{103}	—	July 25, 2003	Palomar	NEAT	·	2.3 km	MPC · JPL
420027	2011 CW_{106}	—	September 21, 2009	Mount Lemmon	Mount Lemmon Survey	KOR	1.2 km	MPC · JPL
420028	2011 CK_{114}	—	December 28, 2005	Mount Lemmon	Mount Lemmon Survey	·	2.2 km	MPC · JPL
420029	2011 CB_{117}	—	October 26, 2009	Kitt Peak	Spacewatch	·	1.5 km	MPC · JPL
420030	2011 CT_{117}	—	December 14, 2004	Socorro	LINEAR	·	3.1 km	MPC · JPL
420031	2011 CV_{117}	—	September 6, 2008	Mount Lemmon	Mount Lemmon Survey	·	1.6 km	MPC · JPL
420032	2011 DS_{1}	—	September 21, 2009	Mount Lemmon	Mount Lemmon Survey	JUN	1.2 km	MPC · JPL
420033	2011 DA_{2}	—	December 10, 2010	Mount Lemmon	Mount Lemmon Survey	·	3.4 km	MPC · JPL
420034	2011 DO_{2}	—	January 31, 2006	Mount Lemmon	Mount Lemmon Survey	·	2.4 km	MPC · JPL
420035	2011 DO_{7}	—	September 3, 2008	Kitt Peak	Spacewatch	·	2.6 km	MPC · JPL
420036	2011 DC_{10}	—	February 9, 2011	Mount Lemmon	Mount Lemmon Survey	EOS	1.6 km	MPC · JPL
420037	2011 DY_{10}	—	January 28, 2006	Mount Lemmon	Mount Lemmon Survey	·	3.7 km	MPC · JPL
420038	2011 DA_{11}	—	March 3, 2000	Socorro	LINEAR	·	2.9 km	MPC · JPL
420039	2011 DC_{11}	—	October 8, 2008	Mount Lemmon	Mount Lemmon Survey	·	3.0 km	MPC · JPL
420040	2011 DJ_{12}	—	March 21, 2002	Kitt Peak	Spacewatch	·	2.2 km	MPC · JPL
420041	2011 DV_{12}	—	April 8, 2002	Palomar	NEAT	·	2.5 km	MPC · JPL
420042	2011 DW_{12}	—	September 29, 2009	Mount Lemmon	Mount Lemmon Survey	·	1.8 km	MPC · JPL
420043	2011 DY_{14}	—	November 6, 2005	Mount Lemmon	Mount Lemmon Survey	·	1.1 km	MPC · JPL
420044	2011 DZ_{15}	—	February 25, 2006	Kitt Peak	Spacewatch	·	2.6 km	MPC · JPL
420045	2011 DJ_{16}	—	January 30, 2006	Kitt Peak	Spacewatch	·	2.5 km	MPC · JPL
420046	2011 DR_{16}	—	March 14, 2007	Kitt Peak	Spacewatch	·	1.5 km	MPC · JPL
420047	2011 DR_{18}	—	September 22, 2003	Palomar	NEAT	·	2.7 km	MPC · JPL
420048	2011 DL_{19}	—	December 6, 2010	Mount Lemmon	Mount Lemmon Survey	APO	600 m	MPC · JPL
420049	2011 DD_{20}	—	May 28, 2008	Mount Lemmon	Mount Lemmon Survey	·	1.5 km	MPC · JPL
420050	2011 DZ_{20}	—	December 30, 2005	Kitt Peak	Spacewatch	AGN	870 m	MPC · JPL
420051	2011 DD_{22}	—	February 26, 2011	Kitt Peak	Spacewatch	·	3.2 km	MPC · JPL
420052	2011 DS_{23}	—	October 25, 2009	Kitt Peak	Spacewatch	MRX	1.0 km	MPC · JPL
420053	2011 DF_{29}	—	September 5, 2008	Kitt Peak	Spacewatch	·	3.2 km	MPC · JPL
420054	2011 DR_{30}	—	December 22, 2001	Socorro	LINEAR	·	1.7 km	MPC · JPL
420055	2011 DB_{36}	—	September 19, 2003	Kitt Peak	Spacewatch	·	2.4 km	MPC · JPL
420056	2011 DZ_{36}	—	March 3, 2006	Kitt Peak	Spacewatch	KOR	1.3 km	MPC · JPL
420057	2011 DX_{38}	—	September 5, 2008	Kitt Peak	Spacewatch	EOS	1.9 km	MPC · JPL
420058	2011 DQ_{42}	—	March 1, 2010	WISE	WISE	·	3.7 km	MPC · JPL
420059	2011 DR_{42}	—	February 2, 2006	Mount Lemmon	Mount Lemmon Survey	·	2.5 km	MPC · JPL
420060	2011 DZ_{48}	—	November 18, 2001	Socorro	LINEAR	·	1.4 km	MPC · JPL
420061	2011 DP_{49}	—	September 30, 2009	Mount Lemmon	Mount Lemmon Survey	·	1.8 km	MPC · JPL
420062	2011 EX	—	February 26, 2007	Mount Lemmon	Mount Lemmon Survey	·	790 m	MPC · JPL
420063	2011 EY	—	February 23, 1998	Kitt Peak	Spacewatch	·	1.5 km	MPC · JPL
420064	2011 EA_{6}	—	April 13, 2002	Palomar	NEAT	·	2.3 km	MPC · JPL
420065	2011 EF_{6}	—	January 30, 2011	Kitt Peak	Spacewatch	·	2.3 km	MPC · JPL
420066	2011 EW_{17}	—	November 30, 2005	Kitt Peak	Spacewatch	·	1.6 km	MPC · JPL
420067	2011 EF_{18}	—	September 19, 2001	Socorro	LINEAR	·	1.2 km	MPC · JPL
420068	2011 EG_{18}	—	February 5, 2010	WISE	WISE	·	2.4 km	MPC · JPL
420069	2011 EQ_{19}	—	January 31, 2006	Kitt Peak	Spacewatch	KOR	1.3 km	MPC · JPL
420070	2011 EZ_{19}	—	April 8, 2006	Kitt Peak	Spacewatch	·	3.5 km	MPC · JPL
420071	2011 EW_{21}	—	March 4, 2011	Kitt Peak	Spacewatch	EOS	1.6 km	MPC · JPL
420072	2011 EA_{27}	—	March 6, 2011	Mount Lemmon	Mount Lemmon Survey	·	3.3 km	MPC · JPL
420073	2011 EK_{27}	—	February 23, 2011	Kitt Peak	Spacewatch	·	2.3 km	MPC · JPL
420074	2011 EC_{31}	—	December 10, 2005	Kitt Peak	Spacewatch	·	1.9 km	MPC · JPL
420075	2011 EV_{31}	—	November 23, 2009	Mount Lemmon	Mount Lemmon Survey	EMA	4.3 km	MPC · JPL
420076	2011 EU_{32}	—	July 26, 2008	Siding Spring	SSS	·	2.4 km	MPC · JPL
420077	2011 EV_{32}	—	December 27, 2005	Kitt Peak	Spacewatch	MRX	820 m	MPC · JPL
420078	2011 EZ_{33}	—	January 5, 2006	Catalina	CSS	·	2.1 km	MPC · JPL
420079	2011 EE_{37}	—	February 25, 2011	Kitt Peak	Spacewatch	·	2.5 km	MPC · JPL
420080	2011 EL_{38}	—	March 2, 2011	Kitt Peak	Spacewatch	·	3.3 km	MPC · JPL
420081	2011 EL_{39}	—	September 2, 2008	Kitt Peak	Spacewatch	·	2.9 km	MPC · JPL
420082	2011 EE_{43}	—	January 17, 2011	Mount Lemmon	Mount Lemmon Survey	·	2.9 km	MPC · JPL
420083	2011 EW_{44}	—	October 6, 2008	Mount Lemmon	Mount Lemmon Survey	·	2.6 km	MPC · JPL
420084	2011 EX_{49}	—	February 19, 2010	WISE	WISE	·	3.3 km	MPC · JPL
420085	2011 EH_{50}	—	October 18, 2009	Catalina	CSS	·	2.3 km	MPC · JPL
420086	2011 EW_{50}	—	April 20, 2006	Kitt Peak	Spacewatch	·	3.2 km	MPC · JPL
420087	2011 EF_{52}	—	October 14, 2009	Mount Lemmon	Mount Lemmon Survey	·	1.3 km	MPC · JPL
420088	2011 EC_{53}	—	February 2, 2006	Mount Lemmon	Mount Lemmon Survey	·	2.4 km	MPC · JPL
420089	2011 EC_{55}	—	September 24, 2008	Kitt Peak	Spacewatch	·	3.0 km	MPC · JPL
420090	2011 EU_{55}	—	October 20, 2003	Kitt Peak	Spacewatch	·	2.1 km	MPC · JPL
420091	2011 EO_{57}	—	October 9, 2004	Kitt Peak	Spacewatch	·	1.8 km	MPC · JPL
420092	2011 EJ_{59}	—	March 14, 2010	WISE	WISE	·	3.9 km	MPC · JPL
420093	2011 EL_{59}	—	May 11, 2003	Kitt Peak	Spacewatch	(5)	1.3 km	MPC · JPL
420094	2011 ES_{60}	—	March 12, 2011	Mount Lemmon	Mount Lemmon Survey	·	3.0 km	MPC · JPL
420095	2011 EA_{61}	—	August 30, 2002	Palomar	NEAT	·	3.0 km	MPC · JPL
420096	2011 EW_{67}	—	September 7, 2004	Kitt Peak	Spacewatch	·	2.2 km	MPC · JPL
420097	2011 EV_{68}	—	October 9, 2008	Kitt Peak	Spacewatch	·	3.4 km	MPC · JPL
420098	2011 EF_{69}	—	March 24, 2006	Mount Lemmon	Mount Lemmon Survey	EOS	1.6 km	MPC · JPL
420099	2011 ER_{73}	—	January 23, 2006	Kitt Peak	Spacewatch	MRX	1.3 km	MPC · JPL
420100	2011 EP_{78}	—	February 4, 2005	Mount Lemmon	Mount Lemmon Survey	THM	2.3 km	MPC · JPL

== 420101–420200 ==
back to top

Designation			Discovery			Properties		Ref
Permanent	Provisional	Named after	Date	Site	Discoverer(s)	Category	Diam.	Ref
420101	2011 EK_{80}	—	February 2, 2006	Kitt Peak	Spacewatch	·	2.1 km	MPC · JPL
420102	2011 EH_{82}	—	January 28, 2011	Kitt Peak	Spacewatch	·	2.3 km	MPC · JPL
420103	2011 ER_{85}	—	October 23, 2001	Anderson Mesa	LONEOS	·	1.8 km	MPC · JPL
420104	2011 EB_{86}	—	October 7, 2008	Mount Lemmon	Mount Lemmon Survey	EOS	2.3 km	MPC · JPL
420105	2011 FC	—	November 27, 2009	Mount Lemmon	Mount Lemmon Survey	EOS	2.3 km	MPC · JPL
420106	2011 FP_{2}	—	April 6, 2003	Anderson Mesa	LONEOS	·	3.4 km	MPC · JPL
420107	2011 FH_{4}	—	January 8, 2011	Mount Lemmon	Mount Lemmon Survey	·	3.7 km	MPC · JPL
420108	2011 FQ_{5}	—	December 18, 2001	Socorro	LINEAR	·	1.3 km	MPC · JPL
420109	2011 FX_{6}	—	February 24, 2006	Kitt Peak	Spacewatch	·	1.5 km	MPC · JPL
420110	2011 FK_{7}	—	September 7, 2008	Mount Lemmon	Mount Lemmon Survey	·	2.5 km	MPC · JPL
420111	2011 FC_{11}	—	March 14, 2011	Mount Lemmon	Mount Lemmon Survey	·	1.7 km	MPC · JPL
420112	2011 FU_{13}	—	March 13, 2002	Socorro	LINEAR	·	1.7 km	MPC · JPL
420113	2011 FS_{15}	—	September 6, 2008	Mount Lemmon	Mount Lemmon Survey	VER	3.0 km	MPC · JPL
420114	2011 FF_{17}	—	October 23, 2003	Kitt Peak	Spacewatch	·	2.4 km	MPC · JPL
420115	2011 FC_{18}	—	November 24, 2009	Mount Lemmon	Mount Lemmon Survey	·	4.0 km	MPC · JPL
420116	2011 FF_{19}	—	March 28, 2011	Kitt Peak	Spacewatch	·	2.6 km	MPC · JPL
420117	2011 FL_{22}	—	February 26, 2010	WISE	WISE	·	1.8 km	MPC · JPL
420118	2011 FJ_{23}	—	December 26, 2005	Mount Lemmon	Mount Lemmon Survey	·	1.9 km	MPC · JPL
420119	2011 FW_{23}	—	November 20, 2008	Mount Lemmon	Mount Lemmon Survey	·	3.2 km	MPC · JPL
420120	2011 FS_{25}	—	February 24, 2006	Catalina	CSS	BRA	1.8 km	MPC · JPL
420121	2011 FD_{28}	—	May 12, 1996	Kitt Peak	Spacewatch	EOS	2.5 km	MPC · JPL
420122	2011 FF_{28}	—	December 16, 1993	Kitt Peak	Spacewatch	EOS	2.4 km	MPC · JPL
420123	2011 FD_{35}	—	March 5, 2011	Kitt Peak	Spacewatch	·	1.7 km	MPC · JPL
420124	2011 FP_{36}	—	March 17, 2010	WISE	WISE	·	4.4 km	MPC · JPL
420125	2011 FV_{40}	—	April 5, 2000	Kitt Peak	Spacewatch	·	2.7 km	MPC · JPL
420126	2011 FQ_{42}	—	October 8, 2008	Kitt Peak	Spacewatch	·	3.2 km	MPC · JPL
420127	2011 FS_{42}	—	November 1, 2008	Kitt Peak	Spacewatch	·	3.5 km	MPC · JPL
420128	2011 FW_{43}	—	March 5, 2011	Kitt Peak	Spacewatch	·	2.4 km	MPC · JPL
420129	2011 FL_{45}	—	March 2, 2011	Kitt Peak	Spacewatch	·	2.6 km	MPC · JPL
420130	2011 FB_{47}	—	January 19, 1999	Kitt Peak	Spacewatch	THM	2.4 km	MPC · JPL
420131	2011 FK_{49}	—	September 29, 2008	Mount Lemmon	Mount Lemmon Survey	·	2.3 km	MPC · JPL
420132	2011 FF_{52}	—	February 26, 2011	Kitt Peak	Spacewatch	·	2.8 km	MPC · JPL
420133	2011 FS_{54}	—	February 24, 2006	Kitt Peak	Spacewatch	KOR	1.5 km	MPC · JPL
420134	2011 FA_{61}	—	September 30, 2003	Kitt Peak	Spacewatch	·	3.6 km	MPC · JPL
420135	2011 FB_{68}	—	November 20, 2009	Mount Lemmon	Mount Lemmon Survey	·	1.7 km	MPC · JPL
420136	2011 FH_{68}	—	March 27, 2011	Mount Lemmon	Mount Lemmon Survey	·	2.9 km	MPC · JPL
420137	2011 FA_{72}	—	October 22, 2003	Apache Point	SDSS	·	2.6 km	MPC · JPL
420138	2011 FA_{75}	—	September 17, 2003	Kitt Peak	Spacewatch	EOS	2.0 km	MPC · JPL
420139	2011 FB_{79}	—	September 20, 2008	Mount Lemmon	Mount Lemmon Survey	·	2.8 km	MPC · JPL
420140	2011 FS_{80}	—	September 23, 2008	Mount Lemmon	Mount Lemmon Survey	EOS	1.8 km	MPC · JPL
420141	2011 FV_{82}	—	October 24, 2008	Kitt Peak	Spacewatch	THM	2.6 km	MPC · JPL
420142	2011 FA_{85}	—	May 2, 2006	Kitt Peak	Spacewatch	VER	3.6 km	MPC · JPL
420143	2011 FQ_{88}	—	March 9, 2011	Mount Lemmon	Mount Lemmon Survey	EUN	1.5 km	MPC · JPL
420144	2011 FB_{90}	—	April 22, 2007	Mount Lemmon	Mount Lemmon Survey	·	2.2 km	MPC · JPL
420145	2011 FG_{92}	—	March 25, 2006	Mount Lemmon	Mount Lemmon Survey	·	1.7 km	MPC · JPL
420146	2011 FP_{93}	—	September 30, 2003	Kitt Peak	Spacewatch	·	3.0 km	MPC · JPL
420147	2011 FR_{120}	—	September 20, 2008	Mount Lemmon	Mount Lemmon Survey	·	2.3 km	MPC · JPL
420148	2011 FE_{123}	—	January 19, 2005	Kitt Peak	Spacewatch	·	3.1 km	MPC · JPL
420149	2011 FK_{128}	—	January 13, 2005	Kitt Peak	Spacewatch	·	3.1 km	MPC · JPL
420150	2011 FF_{129}	—	October 22, 2003	Apache Point	SDSS	·	3.1 km	MPC · JPL
420151	2011 FV_{139}	—	September 13, 2002	Palomar	NEAT	·	3.5 km	MPC · JPL
420152	2011 FO_{140}	—	October 8, 2008	Kitt Peak	Spacewatch	·	3.0 km	MPC · JPL
420153	2011 FQ_{140}	—	March 25, 2006	Mount Lemmon	Mount Lemmon Survey	·	2.3 km	MPC · JPL
420154	2011 FU_{141}	—	March 7, 2011	Siding Spring	SSS	·	3.2 km	MPC · JPL
420155	2011 FQ_{146}	—	February 10, 2011	Catalina	CSS	·	2.0 km	MPC · JPL
420156	2011 FR_{148}	—	September 10, 2007	Mount Lemmon	Mount Lemmon Survey	·	5.8 km	MPC · JPL
420157	2011 FL_{151}	—	March 29, 2011	Catalina	CSS	·	3.1 km	MPC · JPL
420158	2011 FP_{152}	—	November 28, 2005	Mount Lemmon	Mount Lemmon Survey	JUN	1.3 km	MPC · JPL
420159	2011 FU_{153}	—	February 5, 2011	Mount Lemmon	Mount Lemmon Survey	·	2.8 km	MPC · JPL
420160	2011 FA_{155}	—	May 6, 2010	WISE	WISE	·	4.2 km	MPC · JPL
420161	2011 FK_{155}	—	September 9, 2008	Kitt Peak	Spacewatch	·	2.1 km	MPC · JPL
420162	2011 FY_{156}	—	November 2, 2008	Mount Lemmon	Mount Lemmon Survey	·	3.8 km	MPC · JPL
420163	2011 FB_{157}	—	March 14, 2011	Kitt Peak	Spacewatch	·	2.3 km	MPC · JPL
420164	2011 GU_{2}	—	January 8, 2011	Mount Lemmon	Mount Lemmon Survey	·	2.5 km	MPC · JPL
420165	2011 GX_{4}	—	May 7, 2006	Mount Lemmon	Mount Lemmon Survey	·	3.3 km	MPC · JPL
420166	2011 GD_{7}	—	December 22, 2005	Kitt Peak	Spacewatch	AEO	2.0 km	MPC · JPL
420167	2011 GP_{10}	—	October 25, 2008	Kitt Peak	Spacewatch	·	2.7 km	MPC · JPL
420168	2011 GU_{10}	—	September 2, 2008	Kitt Peak	Spacewatch	EOS	1.6 km	MPC · JPL
420169	2011 GC_{12}	—	March 11, 2011	Mount Lemmon	Mount Lemmon Survey	·	2.8 km	MPC · JPL
420170	2011 GK_{28}	—	April 4, 2002	Palomar	NEAT	·	1.9 km	MPC · JPL
420171	2011 GM_{28}	—	December 10, 2005	Kitt Peak	Spacewatch	·	2.2 km	MPC · JPL
420172	2011 GU_{28}	—	March 26, 2006	Mount Lemmon	Mount Lemmon Survey	EOS	1.6 km	MPC · JPL
420173	2011 GN_{30}	—	October 8, 2008	Kitt Peak	Spacewatch	·	2.6 km	MPC · JPL
420174	2011 GJ_{32}	—	October 24, 2008	Kitt Peak	Spacewatch	·	2.8 km	MPC · JPL
420175	2011 GZ_{35}	—	March 8, 1997	Kitt Peak	Spacewatch	·	1.4 km	MPC · JPL
420176	2011 GD_{37}	—	May 21, 2006	Kitt Peak	Spacewatch	·	2.8 km	MPC · JPL
420177	2011 GJ_{37}	—	September 13, 2002	Palomar	NEAT	·	760 m	MPC · JPL
420178	2011 GO_{40}	—	December 20, 2009	Mount Lemmon	Mount Lemmon Survey	·	3.2 km	MPC · JPL
420179	2011 GK_{42}	—	October 30, 2008	Mount Lemmon	Mount Lemmon Survey	VER	3.2 km	MPC · JPL
420180	2011 GE_{43}	—	March 4, 2006	Kitt Peak	Spacewatch	·	3.1 km	MPC · JPL
420181	2011 GF_{46}	—	March 24, 2006	Mount Lemmon	Mount Lemmon Survey	·	2.7 km	MPC · JPL
420182	2011 GG_{46}	—	May 16, 2007	Mount Lemmon	Mount Lemmon Survey	·	1.9 km	MPC · JPL
420183	2011 GG_{47}	—	March 1, 2011	Mount Lemmon	Mount Lemmon Survey	EUN	1.8 km	MPC · JPL
420184	2011 GJ_{48}	—	September 7, 2008	Mount Lemmon	Mount Lemmon Survey	KOR	1.4 km	MPC · JPL
420185	2011 GM_{49}	—	September 4, 2008	Kitt Peak	Spacewatch	·	3.0 km	MPC · JPL
420186	2011 GU_{52}	—	September 25, 2008	Mount Lemmon	Mount Lemmon Survey	·	2.2 km	MPC · JPL
420187	2011 GA_{55}	—	October 10, 2008	Catalina	CSS	AMO +1km	830 m	MPC · JPL
420188	2011 GY_{55}	—	February 27, 2006	Kitt Peak	Spacewatch	·	2.9 km	MPC · JPL
420189	2011 GY_{58}	—	March 25, 2006	Kitt Peak	Spacewatch	·	3.0 km	MPC · JPL
420190	2011 GM_{60}	—	March 28, 2010	WISE	WISE	·	4.4 km	MPC · JPL
420191	2011 GT_{60}	—	September 2, 2008	Kitt Peak	Spacewatch	·	2.8 km	MPC · JPL
420192	2011 GW_{60}	—	May 17, 2002	Kitt Peak	Spacewatch	·	2.0 km	MPC · JPL
420193	2011 GN_{61}	—	December 19, 2009	Mount Lemmon	Mount Lemmon Survey	·	2.4 km	MPC · JPL
420194	2011 GZ_{62}	—	April 30, 2006	Kitt Peak	Spacewatch	·	2.3 km	MPC · JPL
420195	2011 GB_{63}	—	March 14, 2011	Catalina	CSS	·	4.5 km	MPC · JPL
420196	2011 GR_{67}	—	March 10, 2002	Palomar	NEAT	·	2.5 km	MPC · JPL
420197	2011 GC_{69}	—	October 17, 2009	Mount Lemmon	Mount Lemmon Survey	·	2.8 km	MPC · JPL
420198	2011 GS_{69}	—	April 29, 2010	WISE	WISE	VER	3.2 km	MPC · JPL
420199	2011 GD_{70}	—	October 25, 2008	Kitt Peak	Spacewatch	EOS	2.9 km	MPC · JPL
420200	2011 GN_{73}	—	March 12, 2005	Kitt Peak	Spacewatch	·	2.7 km	MPC · JPL

== 420201–420300 ==
back to top

Designation			Discovery			Properties		Ref
Permanent	Provisional	Named after	Date	Site	Discoverer(s)	Category	Diam.	Ref
420201	2011 GF_{76}	—	November 23, 2003	Kitt Peak	Spacewatch	·	3.8 km	MPC · JPL
420202	2011 GG_{76}	—	December 15, 2009	Mount Lemmon	Mount Lemmon Survey	·	3.1 km	MPC · JPL
420203	2011 GP_{77}	—	March 11, 2005	Kitt Peak	Spacewatch	·	3.2 km	MPC · JPL
420204	2011 GR_{79}	—	March 25, 2011	Kitt Peak	Spacewatch	·	3.0 km	MPC · JPL
420205	2011 GX_{79}	—	October 6, 2004	Kitt Peak	Spacewatch	·	2.3 km	MPC · JPL
420206	2011 GB_{81}	—	December 27, 2005	Kitt Peak	Spacewatch	·	1.4 km	MPC · JPL
420207	2011 GV_{87}	—	November 10, 2004	Kitt Peak	Spacewatch	·	1.9 km	MPC · JPL
420208	2011 GW_{87}	—	December 25, 1998	Kitt Peak	Spacewatch	·	3.7 km	MPC · JPL
420209	2011 GH_{88}	—	December 10, 2009	Mount Lemmon	Mount Lemmon Survey	·	2.2 km	MPC · JPL
420210	2011 HF	—	April 22, 2011	Kitt Peak	Spacewatch	APO · PHA	290 m	MPC · JPL
420211	2011 HN_{1}	—	October 5, 2002	Apache Point	SDSS	·	4.2 km	MPC · JPL
420212	2011 HS_{1}	—	November 23, 2009	Mount Lemmon	Mount Lemmon Survey	·	2.1 km	MPC · JPL
420213	2011 HE_{3}	—	February 2, 2005	Catalina	CSS	·	3.4 km	MPC · JPL
420214	2011 HM_{3}	—	October 29, 2002	Apache Point	SDSS	VER	2.7 km	MPC · JPL
420215	2011 HN_{3}	—	April 30, 2006	Kitt Peak	Spacewatch	·	2.1 km	MPC · JPL
420216	2011 HS_{3}	—	December 20, 2009	Mount Lemmon	Mount Lemmon Survey	·	2.2 km	MPC · JPL
420217	2011 HR_{5}	—	October 22, 2005	Kitt Peak	Spacewatch	·	1.6 km	MPC · JPL
420218	2011 HW_{5}	—	April 27, 2000	Socorro	LINEAR	·	3.2 km	MPC · JPL
420219	2011 HK_{12}	—	October 7, 2008	Mount Lemmon	Mount Lemmon Survey	·	2.1 km	MPC · JPL
420220	2011 HO_{14}	—	April 2, 2006	Kitt Peak	Spacewatch	·	1.9 km	MPC · JPL
420221	2011 HS_{16}	—	October 26, 2008	Kitt Peak	Spacewatch	·	2.6 km	MPC · JPL
420222	2011 HR_{20}	—	March 14, 2011	Mount Lemmon	Mount Lemmon Survey	·	2.8 km	MPC · JPL
420223	2011 HO_{28}	—	March 19, 2005	Siding Spring	SSS	·	4.2 km	MPC · JPL
420224	2011 HP_{31}	—	December 1, 2003	Kitt Peak	Spacewatch	·	2.8 km	MPC · JPL
420225	2011 HF_{32}	—	November 7, 2008	Mount Lemmon	Mount Lemmon Survey	·	3.6 km	MPC · JPL
420226	2011 HQ_{34}	—	May 24, 2000	Kitt Peak	Spacewatch	·	3.3 km	MPC · JPL
420227	2011 HS_{42}	—	December 14, 2004	Kitt Peak	Spacewatch	·	2.4 km	MPC · JPL
420228	2011 HN_{45}	—	April 28, 2011	Kitt Peak	Spacewatch	·	2.4 km	MPC · JPL
420229	2011 HM_{47}	—	September 23, 2008	Mount Lemmon	Mount Lemmon Survey	·	2.3 km	MPC · JPL
420230	2011 HR_{51}	—	October 29, 2008	Mount Lemmon	Mount Lemmon Survey	VER	2.5 km	MPC · JPL
420231	2011 HA_{52}	—	December 20, 2009	Mount Lemmon	Mount Lemmon Survey	·	2.4 km	MPC · JPL
420232	2011 HE_{54}	—	October 7, 2008	Mount Lemmon	Mount Lemmon Survey	·	3.0 km	MPC · JPL
420233	2011 HA_{56}	—	December 25, 2009	Kitt Peak	Spacewatch	·	2.1 km	MPC · JPL
420234	2011 HJ_{60}	—	October 16, 2009	Mount Lemmon	Mount Lemmon Survey	·	2.0 km	MPC · JPL
420235	2011 HP_{60}	—	November 24, 2003	Kitt Peak	Spacewatch	·	2.9 km	MPC · JPL
420236	2011 HA_{63}	—	April 29, 2011	Catalina	CSS	·	4.9 km	MPC · JPL
420237	2011 HH_{63}	—	April 22, 2011	Kitt Peak	Spacewatch	·	3.2 km	MPC · JPL
420238	2011 HQ_{63}	—	October 23, 2003	Kitt Peak	Spacewatch	·	2.1 km	MPC · JPL
420239	2011 HP_{64}	—	January 6, 2010	Kitt Peak	Spacewatch	·	3.7 km	MPC · JPL
420240	2011 HU_{64}	—	November 16, 2002	Palomar	NEAT	·	3.7 km	MPC · JPL
420241	2011 HD_{65}	—	March 9, 2005	Catalina	CSS	·	4.0 km	MPC · JPL
420242	2011 HN_{65}	—	October 6, 2008	Mount Lemmon	Mount Lemmon Survey	·	3.3 km	MPC · JPL
420243	2011 HE_{68}	—	May 8, 2010	WISE	WISE	SYL · CYB	4.3 km	MPC · JPL
420244	2011 HT_{76}	—	May 9, 2006	Mount Lemmon	Mount Lemmon Survey	·	3.2 km	MPC · JPL
420245	2011 HQ_{78}	—	October 2, 2008	Kitt Peak	Spacewatch	·	3.5 km	MPC · JPL
420246	2011 HN_{84}	—	May 18, 2010	WISE	WISE	·	4.0 km	MPC · JPL
420247	2011 HC_{97}	—	September 3, 2008	Kitt Peak	Spacewatch	EOS	1.8 km	MPC · JPL
420248	2011 JW_{2}	—	January 12, 2010	Catalina	CSS	·	4.6 km	MPC · JPL
420249	2011 JQ_{4}	—	March 1, 2005	Kitt Peak	Spacewatch	·	2.7 km	MPC · JPL
420250	2011 JF_{7}	—	October 8, 1996	Kitt Peak	Spacewatch	H	450 m	MPC · JPL
420251	2011 JY_{7}	—	March 12, 2005	Socorro	LINEAR	T_{j} (2.99)	4.9 km	MPC · JPL
420252	2011 JP_{8}	—	April 19, 2010	WISE	WISE	·	3.5 km	MPC · JPL
420253	2011 JV_{9}	—	May 7, 2011	Mount Lemmon	Mount Lemmon Survey	L5	20 km	MPC · JPL
420254	2011 JJ_{12}	—	April 24, 2011	Kitt Peak	Spacewatch	·	2.6 km	MPC · JPL
420255	2011 JR_{12}	—	January 14, 2011	Mount Lemmon	Mount Lemmon Survey	·	3.7 km	MPC · JPL
420256	2011 JU_{14}	—	March 4, 2000	Socorro	LINEAR	·	3.3 km	MPC · JPL
420257	2011 JA_{15}	—	October 10, 2002	Apache Point	SDSS	·	3.5 km	MPC · JPL
420258	2011 JX_{16}	—	November 18, 2003	Kitt Peak	Spacewatch	·	2.9 km	MPC · JPL
420259	2011 JP_{17}	—	March 13, 2005	Catalina	CSS	·	2.8 km	MPC · JPL
420260	2011 JN_{20}	—	April 16, 2004	Kitt Peak	Spacewatch	CYB	4.3 km	MPC · JPL
420261	2011 JO_{26}	—	April 28, 2011	Kitt Peak	Spacewatch	·	3.6 km	MPC · JPL
420262	2011 KD_{11}	—	May 25, 2011	Siding Spring	SSS	APO	330 m	MPC · JPL
420263	2011 KO_{14}	—	March 29, 2010	WISE	WISE	·	3.3 km	MPC · JPL
420264	2011 KP_{14}	—	May 4, 2005	Catalina	CSS	T_{j} (2.99)	4.7 km	MPC · JPL
420265	2011 KG_{17}	—	December 18, 2003	Kitt Peak	Spacewatch	L5	10 km	MPC · JPL
420266	2011 KZ_{19}	—	May 31, 2011	Mount Lemmon	Mount Lemmon Survey	L5	10 km	MPC · JPL
420267	2011 KH_{22}	—	December 19, 2003	Kitt Peak	Spacewatch	EOS	2.2 km	MPC · JPL
420268	2011 KR_{22}	—	May 22, 2011	Kitt Peak	Spacewatch	H	650 m	MPC · JPL
420269	2011 KJ_{29}	—	March 21, 2010	Catalina	CSS	·	4.3 km	MPC · JPL
420270	2011 KO_{37}	—	December 31, 2008	Kitt Peak	Spacewatch	3:2 · (6124)	6.4 km	MPC · JPL
420271	2011 KG_{43}	—	April 13, 2010	WISE	WISE	·	2.3 km	MPC · JPL
420272	2011 KB_{44}	—	March 16, 2005	Mount Lemmon	Mount Lemmon Survey	·	2.7 km	MPC · JPL
420273	2011 LG_{5}	—	December 3, 2008	Mount Lemmon	Mount Lemmon Survey	EOS	2.4 km	MPC · JPL
420274	2011 LH_{5}	—	November 7, 2008	Mount Lemmon	Mount Lemmon Survey	·	3.6 km	MPC · JPL
420275	2011 LE_{12}	—	December 1, 2008	Kitt Peak	Spacewatch	EOS	2.2 km	MPC · JPL
420276	2011 LY_{19}	—	June 8, 2011	Mount Lemmon	Mount Lemmon Survey	L5	7.2 km	MPC · JPL
420277	2011 LB_{22}	—	January 8, 2010	Mount Lemmon	Mount Lemmon Survey	·	3.2 km	MPC · JPL
420278	2011 LC_{24}	—	February 4, 2005	Mount Lemmon	Mount Lemmon Survey	·	1.7 km	MPC · JPL
420279	2011 ML_{8}	—	January 8, 2010	Catalina	CSS	H	650 m	MPC · JPL
420280	2011 OC_{26}	—	May 29, 2003	Apache Point	SDSS	H	520 m	MPC · JPL
420281	2011 OH_{52}	—	March 29, 2010	WISE	WISE	L5	10 km	MPC · JPL
420282	2011 QE	—	September 20, 2001	Socorro	LINEAR	H	550 m	MPC · JPL
420283	2011 QR_{4}	—	January 16, 2005	Kitt Peak	Spacewatch	L5	9.8 km	MPC · JPL
420284	2011 QF_{13}	—	December 20, 2009	Mount Lemmon	Mount Lemmon Survey	H	680 m	MPC · JPL
420285	2011 QR_{47}	—	August 24, 2011	Siding Spring	SSS	L5	9.0 km	MPC · JPL
420286	2011 RZ	—	September 5, 2011	Haleakala	Pan-STARRS 1	APO	660 m	MPC · JPL
420287	2011 SZ_{1}	—	November 1, 2007	Kitt Peak	Spacewatch	·	1.3 km	MPC · JPL
420288	2011 SC_{135}	—	October 22, 2003	Socorro	LINEAR	H	820 m	MPC · JPL
420289	2011 SK_{262}	—	September 7, 2000	Kitt Peak	Spacewatch	L5	8.9 km	MPC · JPL
420290	2011 UB_{142}	—	March 15, 2007	Mount Lemmon	Mount Lemmon Survey	·	740 m	MPC · JPL
420291	2011 UV_{246}	—	January 1, 2009	Mount Lemmon	Mount Lemmon Survey	·	810 m	MPC · JPL
420292	2011 UN_{321}	—	September 24, 2011	Catalina	CSS	H	540 m	MPC · JPL
420293	2011 UX_{332}	—	April 9, 2010	Mount Lemmon	Mount Lemmon Survey	H	630 m	MPC · JPL
420294	2011 UF_{369}	—	October 22, 2011	Kitt Peak	Spacewatch	·	1.2 km	MPC · JPL
420295	2011 UN_{402}	—	May 11, 2010	Mount Lemmon	Mount Lemmon Survey	H	610 m	MPC · JPL
420296	2011 VO_{18}	—	November 1, 2011	Mount Lemmon	Mount Lemmon Survey	·	930 m	MPC · JPL
420297	2011 WK_{12}	—	October 7, 2001	Palomar	NEAT	PHO	950 m	MPC · JPL
420298	2011 WL_{14}	—	December 18, 2003	Socorro	LINEAR	H	680 m	MPC · JPL
420299	2011 WU_{120}	—	December 27, 2003	Socorro	LINEAR	H	650 m	MPC · JPL
420300	2011 WD_{126}	—	February 6, 2007	Mount Lemmon	Mount Lemmon Survey	H	640 m	MPC · JPL

== 420301–420400 ==
back to top

Designation			Discovery			Properties		Ref
Permanent	Provisional	Named after	Date	Site	Discoverer(s)	Category	Diam.	Ref
420301	2011 WH_{135}	—	September 10, 2007	Mount Lemmon	Mount Lemmon Survey	·	900 m	MPC · JPL
420302	2011 XZ_{1}	—	December 6, 2011	Haleakala	Pan-STARRS 1	AMO +1km	980 m	MPC · JPL
420303	2011 YY_{9}	—	December 25, 2011	Catalina	CSS	H	650 m	MPC · JPL
420304	2011 YJ_{15}	—	September 7, 2004	Kitt Peak	Spacewatch	·	510 m	MPC · JPL
420305	2011 YU_{21}	—	November 27, 2011	Mount Lemmon	Mount Lemmon Survey	·	750 m	MPC · JPL
420306	2011 YZ_{23}	—	September 14, 2007	Mount Lemmon	Mount Lemmon Survey	·	730 m	MPC · JPL
420307	2011 YL_{26}	—	September 11, 2007	Mount Lemmon	Mount Lemmon Survey	·	620 m	MPC · JPL
420308	2011 YG_{54}	—	December 16, 2007	Mount Lemmon	Mount Lemmon Survey	·	1.3 km	MPC · JPL
420309	2011 YU_{56}	—	September 10, 2007	Kitt Peak	Spacewatch	·	570 m	MPC · JPL
420310	2011 YJ_{57}	—	December 14, 2004	Kitt Peak	Spacewatch	·	710 m	MPC · JPL
420311	2011 YB_{60}	—	December 29, 2011	Kitt Peak	Spacewatch	·	1.1 km	MPC · JPL
420312	2011 YW_{60}	—	October 8, 2004	Kitt Peak	Spacewatch	·	640 m	MPC · JPL
420313	2011 YQ_{62}	—	April 18, 2010	WISE	WISE	L5 · 010	10 km	MPC · JPL
420314	2011 YC_{64}	—	December 28, 2007	Kitt Peak	Spacewatch	·	1.3 km	MPC · JPL
420315	2011 YR_{65}	—	January 9, 2002	Socorro	LINEAR	·	800 m	MPC · JPL
420316	2011 YC_{68}	—	September 5, 2010	Mount Lemmon	Mount Lemmon Survey	PHO	1.1 km	MPC · JPL
420317	2011 YR_{73}	—	January 30, 1995	Kitt Peak	Spacewatch	MAR	1.3 km	MPC · JPL
420318	2011 YQ_{77}	—	February 29, 2004	Kitt Peak	Spacewatch	·	1.9 km	MPC · JPL
420319	2011 YE_{78}	—	March 25, 2009	Mount Lemmon	Mount Lemmon Survey	·	1.3 km	MPC · JPL
420320	2012 AP_{1}	—	December 14, 2001	Socorro	LINEAR	·	750 m	MPC · JPL
420321	2012 AM_{3}	—	April 4, 2002	Palomar	NEAT	·	690 m	MPC · JPL
420322	2012 AH_{6}	—	February 6, 2002	Palomar	NEAT	·	690 m	MPC · JPL
420323	2012 AA_{9}	—	November 2, 2007	Kitt Peak	Spacewatch	V	600 m	MPC · JPL
420324	2012 AK_{13}	—	May 6, 2006	Kitt Peak	Spacewatch	·	670 m	MPC · JPL
420325	2012 AS_{17}	—	September 15, 2007	Kitt Peak	Spacewatch	·	760 m	MPC · JPL
420326	2012 AS_{21}	—	December 11, 2004	Kitt Peak	Spacewatch	·	640 m	MPC · JPL
420327	2012 BQ_{2}	—	February 22, 2002	Palomar	NEAT	·	570 m	MPC · JPL
420328	2012 BB_{5}	—	May 11, 2005	Mount Lemmon	Mount Lemmon Survey	·	1.4 km	MPC · JPL
420329	2012 BE_{8}	—	September 18, 2003	Palomar	NEAT	·	1.2 km	MPC · JPL
420330	2012 BV_{9}	—	March 17, 2005	Kitt Peak	Spacewatch	·	860 m	MPC · JPL
420331	2012 BK_{10}	—	January 31, 1995	Kitt Peak	Spacewatch	·	750 m	MPC · JPL
420332	2012 BL_{10}	—	December 28, 2011	Mount Lemmon	Mount Lemmon Survey	·	1.8 km	MPC · JPL
420333	2012 BQ_{10}	—	November 20, 2007	Kitt Peak	Spacewatch	·	890 m	MPC · JPL
420334	2012 BR_{10}	—	December 10, 2004	Kitt Peak	Spacewatch	·	820 m	MPC · JPL
420335	2012 BD_{11}	—	January 29, 2004	Socorro	LINEAR	H	710 m	MPC · JPL
420336	2012 BR_{12}	—	January 18, 2012	Catalina	CSS	·	1.0 km	MPC · JPL
420337	2012 BC_{13}	—	January 6, 2005	Socorro	LINEAR	·	690 m	MPC · JPL
420338	2012 BZ_{23}	—	February 28, 2009	Mount Lemmon	Mount Lemmon Survey	·	630 m	MPC · JPL
420339	2012 BG_{26}	—	January 10, 2008	Mount Lemmon	Mount Lemmon Survey	MAS	690 m	MPC · JPL
420340	2012 BD_{30}	—	September 11, 2007	Kitt Peak	Spacewatch	·	640 m	MPC · JPL
420341	2012 BQ_{39}	—	December 14, 2004	Campo Imperatore	CINEOS	V	700 m	MPC · JPL
420342	2012 BV_{44}	—	October 1, 2003	Kitt Peak	Spacewatch	·	2.6 km	MPC · JPL
420343	2012 BU_{45}	—	March 24, 2009	Mount Lemmon	Mount Lemmon Survey	·	520 m	MPC · JPL
420344	2012 BL_{53}	—	April 12, 2005	Kitt Peak	Spacewatch	MAS	670 m	MPC · JPL
420345	2012 BG_{54}	—	February 10, 2002	Socorro	LINEAR	·	730 m	MPC · JPL
420346	2012 BM_{54}	—	March 11, 2005	Kitt Peak	Spacewatch	·	840 m	MPC · JPL
420347	2012 BB_{56}	—	February 28, 2009	Kitt Peak	Spacewatch	·	1.0 km	MPC · JPL
420348	2012 BM_{56}	—	September 30, 2003	Apache Point	SDSS	·	940 m	MPC · JPL
420349	2012 BT_{64}	—	December 14, 2001	Socorro	LINEAR	·	830 m	MPC · JPL
420350	2012 BQ_{70}	—	January 19, 2005	Kitt Peak	Spacewatch	·	760 m	MPC · JPL
420351	2012 BC_{71}	—	February 7, 2002	Palomar	NEAT	·	630 m	MPC · JPL
420352	2012 BU_{73}	—	November 19, 2007	Mount Lemmon	Mount Lemmon Survey	·	1.0 km	MPC · JPL
420353	2012 BG_{78}	—	January 13, 2005	Kitt Peak	Spacewatch	V	500 m	MPC · JPL
420354	2012 BA_{84}	—	September 10, 2007	Mount Lemmon	Mount Lemmon Survey	·	550 m	MPC · JPL
420355	2012 BK_{85}	—	November 20, 2007	Mount Lemmon	Mount Lemmon Survey	·	820 m	MPC · JPL
420356 Praamžius	2012 BX_{85}	Praamžius	January 23, 2012	Mount Graham	K. Černis, Boyle, R. P.	cubewano (cold)	241 km	MPC · JPL
420357	2012 BW_{88}	—	October 18, 2003	Kitt Peak	Spacewatch	·	1.0 km	MPC · JPL
420358	2012 BB_{89}	—	October 15, 2004	Kitt Peak	Spacewatch	·	590 m	MPC · JPL
420359	2012 BX_{89}	—	February 27, 2009	Kitt Peak	Spacewatch	·	530 m	MPC · JPL
420360	2012 BP_{90}	—	September 17, 2010	Mount Lemmon	Mount Lemmon Survey	·	1.1 km	MPC · JPL
420361	2012 BA_{93}	—	September 13, 2007	Mount Lemmon	Mount Lemmon Survey	·	530 m	MPC · JPL
420362	2012 BB_{96}	—	December 13, 2006	Kitt Peak	Spacewatch	·	2.3 km	MPC · JPL
420363	2012 BK_{99}	—	January 10, 2008	Mount Lemmon	Mount Lemmon Survey	·	1.3 km	MPC · JPL
420364	2012 BJ_{104}	—	July 2, 2008	Mount Lemmon	Mount Lemmon Survey	·	3.7 km	MPC · JPL
420365	2012 BW_{105}	—	January 11, 2008	Kitt Peak	Spacewatch	·	1.2 km	MPC · JPL
420366	2012 BO_{106}	—	March 16, 2005	Catalina	CSS	V	920 m	MPC · JPL
420367	2012 BT_{106}	—	April 2, 2009	Mount Lemmon	Mount Lemmon Survey	·	860 m	MPC · JPL
420368	2012 BK_{110}	—	March 9, 2005	Socorro	LINEAR	·	900 m	MPC · JPL
420369	2012 BZ_{110}	—	December 10, 2004	Kitt Peak	Spacewatch	·	700 m	MPC · JPL
420370	2012 BQ_{111}	—	September 9, 2007	Kitt Peak	Spacewatch	·	770 m	MPC · JPL
420371	2012 BU_{114}	—	October 7, 2007	Mount Lemmon	Mount Lemmon Survey	·	540 m	MPC · JPL
420372	2012 BG_{118}	—	November 7, 2007	Kitt Peak	Spacewatch	·	1.1 km	MPC · JPL
420373	2012 BN_{120}	—	January 9, 2005	Campo Imperatore	CINEOS	·	800 m	MPC · JPL
420374	2012 BP_{121}	—	October 31, 2007	Mount Lemmon	Mount Lemmon Survey	·	590 m	MPC · JPL
420375	2012 BS_{126}	—	October 13, 2007	Kitt Peak	Spacewatch	·	590 m	MPC · JPL
420376	2012 BT_{130}	—	March 16, 2002	Kitt Peak	Spacewatch	·	910 m	MPC · JPL
420377	2012 BC_{133}	—	October 30, 1999	Kitt Peak	Spacewatch	·	1.4 km	MPC · JPL
420378	2012 BF_{138}	—	September 27, 2003	Kitt Peak	Spacewatch	V	720 m	MPC · JPL
420379	2012 BV_{139}	—	November 4, 2007	Kitt Peak	Spacewatch	·	790 m	MPC · JPL
420380	2012 BA_{140}	—	October 12, 1994	Kitt Peak	Spacewatch	·	670 m	MPC · JPL
420381	2012 BJ_{140}	—	November 24, 2008	Catalina	CSS	H	610 m	MPC · JPL
420382	2012 BV_{147}	—	November 11, 2007	Mount Lemmon	Mount Lemmon Survey	V	720 m	MPC · JPL
420383	2012 BQ_{150}	—	October 7, 2007	Kitt Peak	Spacewatch	(2076)	850 m	MPC · JPL
420384	2012 BP_{152}	—	April 7, 2005	Mount Lemmon	Mount Lemmon Survey	NYS	960 m	MPC · JPL
420385	2012 CM_{1}	—	August 28, 2003	Palomar	NEAT	·	880 m	MPC · JPL
420386	2012 CG_{5}	—	October 21, 2003	Kitt Peak	Spacewatch	·	1.0 km	MPC · JPL
420387	2012 CN_{6}	—	December 30, 2007	Kitt Peak	Spacewatch	·	1.2 km	MPC · JPL
420388	2012 CT_{9}	—	February 12, 2000	Apache Point	SDSS	EUN	1.6 km	MPC · JPL
420389	2012 CZ_{14}	—	March 1, 2008	Kitt Peak	Spacewatch	ADE	2.4 km	MPC · JPL
420390	2012 CX_{17}	—	May 16, 2009	Kitt Peak	Spacewatch	·	720 m	MPC · JPL
420391	2012 CV_{20}	—	February 7, 2002	Palomar	NEAT	·	940 m	MPC · JPL
420392	2012 CH_{21}	—	September 28, 2000	Socorro	LINEAR	·	920 m	MPC · JPL
420393	2012 CF_{25}	—	March 6, 2008	Catalina	CSS	·	1.3 km	MPC · JPL
420394	2012 CR_{25}	—	December 4, 2007	Mount Lemmon	Mount Lemmon Survey	V	700 m	MPC · JPL
420395	2012 CB_{37}	—	August 21, 2006	Kitt Peak	Spacewatch	·	1.1 km	MPC · JPL
420396	2012 CD_{39}	—	January 10, 2008	Kitt Peak	Spacewatch	·	1.1 km	MPC · JPL
420397	2012 CU_{39}	—	November 2, 2007	Mount Lemmon	Mount Lemmon Survey	(2076)	740 m	MPC · JPL
420398	2012 CP_{44}	—	December 30, 2007	Kitt Peak	Spacewatch	·	1.1 km	MPC · JPL
420399	2012 CU_{44}	—	January 10, 1997	Kitt Peak	Spacewatch	NYS	1.2 km	MPC · JPL
420400	2012 CY_{44}	—	October 4, 2002	Palomar	NEAT	PHO	1.2 km	MPC · JPL

== 420401–420500 ==
back to top

Designation			Discovery			Properties		Ref
Permanent	Provisional	Named after	Date	Site	Discoverer(s)	Category	Diam.	Ref
420401	2012 CA_{48}	—	August 18, 2006	Kitt Peak	Spacewatch	·	1.4 km	MPC · JPL
420402	2012 CB_{50}	—	April 9, 2005	Mount Lemmon	Mount Lemmon Survey	·	900 m	MPC · JPL
420403	2012 CG_{50}	—	January 12, 2008	Mount Lemmon	Mount Lemmon Survey	·	1.2 km	MPC · JPL
420404	2012 CK_{54}	—	March 7, 2008	Mount Lemmon	Mount Lemmon Survey	·	2.6 km	MPC · JPL
420405	2012 CA_{56}	—	November 7, 2007	Kitt Peak	Spacewatch	·	840 m	MPC · JPL
420406	2012 CB_{57}	—	October 4, 2007	Kitt Peak	Spacewatch	·	740 m	MPC · JPL
420407	2012 DW_{1}	—	March 16, 2007	Mount Lemmon	Mount Lemmon Survey	EOS	1.8 km	MPC · JPL
420408	2012 DN_{5}	—	March 8, 2005	Mount Lemmon	Mount Lemmon Survey	MAS	680 m	MPC · JPL
420409	2012 DD_{6}	—	November 13, 2006	Catalina	CSS	PHO	1.2 km	MPC · JPL
420410	2012 DP_{7}	—	July 6, 2003	Kitt Peak	Spacewatch	·	960 m	MPC · JPL
420411	2012 DF_{9}	—	May 16, 2005	Palomar	NEAT	·	1.1 km	MPC · JPL
420412	2012 DH_{10}	—	March 12, 2005	Socorro	LINEAR	·	810 m	MPC · JPL
420413	2012 DL_{10}	—	December 18, 2004	Mount Lemmon	Mount Lemmon Survey	·	760 m	MPC · JPL
420414	2012 DO_{10}	—	March 11, 2005	Mount Lemmon	Mount Lemmon Survey	·	880 m	MPC · JPL
420415	2012 DV_{11}	—	March 29, 2008	Kitt Peak	Spacewatch	AGN	1.3 km	MPC · JPL
420416	2012 DU_{13}	—	February 19, 2012	Kitt Peak	Spacewatch	MRX	1.1 km	MPC · JPL
420417	2012 DW_{13}	—	January 21, 2012	Kitt Peak	Spacewatch	MAS	690 m	MPC · JPL
420418	2012 DD_{16}	—	October 30, 2010	Mount Lemmon	Mount Lemmon Survey	V	740 m	MPC · JPL
420419	2012 DL_{17}	—	November 8, 2007	Mount Lemmon	Mount Lemmon Survey	·	930 m	MPC · JPL
420420	2012 DT_{17}	—	October 9, 2010	Mount Lemmon	Mount Lemmon Survey	·	740 m	MPC · JPL
420421	2012 DN_{19}	—	September 10, 2010	Kitt Peak	Spacewatch	·	1.4 km	MPC · JPL
420422	2012 DO_{19}	—	December 27, 2011	Mount Lemmon	Mount Lemmon Survey	·	1.2 km	MPC · JPL
420423	2012 DZ_{20}	—	January 9, 1997	Kitt Peak	Spacewatch	·	940 m	MPC · JPL
420424	2012 DL_{21}	—	November 7, 2007	Kitt Peak	Spacewatch	·	610 m	MPC · JPL
420425	2012 DD_{24}	—	September 10, 2010	Kitt Peak	Spacewatch	·	810 m	MPC · JPL
420426	2012 DX_{25}	—	April 11, 2005	Kitt Peak	Spacewatch	·	660 m	MPC · JPL
420427	2012 DF_{27}	—	January 19, 2005	Kitt Peak	Spacewatch	·	590 m	MPC · JPL
420428	2012 DQ_{27}	—	February 21, 2012	Kitt Peak	Spacewatch	·	1.3 km	MPC · JPL
420429	2012 DJ_{28}	—	April 8, 2003	Kitt Peak	Spacewatch	·	1.9 km	MPC · JPL
420430	2012 DZ_{28}	—	March 3, 2005	Catalina	CSS	·	610 m	MPC · JPL
420431	2012 DL_{29}	—	March 10, 2005	Mount Lemmon	Mount Lemmon Survey	·	820 m	MPC · JPL
420432	2012 DO_{29}	—	May 11, 2005	Kitt Peak	Spacewatch	·	900 m	MPC · JPL
420433	2012 DS_{29}	—	March 11, 2005	Kitt Peak	Spacewatch	·	700 m	MPC · JPL
420434	2012 DW_{29}	—	November 25, 2005	Kitt Peak	Spacewatch	·	2.0 km	MPC · JPL
420435	2012 DA_{32}	—	November 17, 2006	Mount Lemmon	Mount Lemmon Survey	·	1.3 km	MPC · JPL
420436	2012 DG_{32}	—	April 12, 2005	Kitt Peak	Spacewatch	·	850 m	MPC · JPL
420437	2012 DA_{36}	—	October 2, 2006	Mount Lemmon	Mount Lemmon Survey	NYS	1.2 km	MPC · JPL
420438	2012 DD_{36}	—	December 13, 2007	Socorro	LINEAR	·	960 m	MPC · JPL
420439	2012 DP_{36}	—	November 8, 2007	Socorro	LINEAR	·	820 m	MPC · JPL
420440	2012 DY_{36}	—	September 18, 2010	Kitt Peak	Spacewatch	·	820 m	MPC · JPL
420441	2012 DF_{37}	—	February 28, 2008	Mount Lemmon	Mount Lemmon Survey	·	1.1 km	MPC · JPL
420442	2012 DU_{37}	—	April 13, 2005	Kitt Peak	Spacewatch	·	940 m	MPC · JPL
420443	2012 DZ_{37}	—	February 25, 2012	Catalina	CSS	·	830 m	MPC · JPL
420444	2012 DF_{38}	—	October 30, 2005	Mount Lemmon	Mount Lemmon Survey	615	1.7 km	MPC · JPL
420445	2012 DA_{39}	—	June 14, 2004	Socorro	LINEAR	·	3.1 km	MPC · JPL
420446	2012 DR_{44}	—	January 17, 2007	Kitt Peak	Spacewatch	AGN	1.3 km	MPC · JPL
420447	2012 DU_{47}	—	October 9, 2010	Mount Lemmon	Mount Lemmon Survey	·	1.2 km	MPC · JPL
420448	2012 DN_{51}	—	September 19, 2006	Kitt Peak	Spacewatch	ERI	1.6 km	MPC · JPL
420449	2012 DE_{58}	—	April 10, 2005	Mount Lemmon	Mount Lemmon Survey	·	850 m	MPC · JPL
420450	2012 DW_{58}	—	September 19, 2003	Palomar	NEAT	·	1.1 km	MPC · JPL
420451	2012 DH_{59}	—	September 28, 2003	Kitt Peak	Spacewatch	·	850 m	MPC · JPL
420452	2012 DJ_{59}	—	September 17, 2010	Kitt Peak	Spacewatch	·	920 m	MPC · JPL
420453	2012 DZ_{61}	—	September 30, 2003	Kitt Peak	Spacewatch	·	1.1 km	MPC · JPL
420454	2012 DD_{64}	—	November 17, 2007	Mount Lemmon	Mount Lemmon Survey	·	730 m	MPC · JPL
420455	2012 DA_{66}	—	September 29, 2010	Mount Lemmon	Mount Lemmon Survey	V	660 m	MPC · JPL
420456	2012 DE_{72}	—	November 19, 2003	Kitt Peak	Spacewatch	·	1.3 km	MPC · JPL
420457	2012 DM_{72}	—	November 11, 2007	Mount Lemmon	Mount Lemmon Survey	V	680 m	MPC · JPL
420458	2012 DE_{73}	—	September 17, 2010	Mount Lemmon	Mount Lemmon Survey	·	1.1 km	MPC · JPL
420459	2012 DS_{73}	—	February 21, 2001	Kitt Peak	Spacewatch	·	1.0 km	MPC · JPL
420460	2012 DO_{74}	—	August 31, 2005	Palomar	NEAT	MAR	1.3 km	MPC · JPL
420461	2012 DJ_{75}	—	October 17, 2003	Kitt Peak	Spacewatch	V	630 m	MPC · JPL
420462	2012 DN_{77}	—	April 14, 2008	Mount Lemmon	Mount Lemmon Survey	·	1.4 km	MPC · JPL
420463	2012 DU_{78}	—	March 17, 2005	Mount Lemmon	Mount Lemmon Survey	PHO	3.8 km	MPC · JPL
420464	2012 DY_{79}	—	August 25, 2005	Palomar	NEAT	MAR	1.4 km	MPC · JPL
420465	2012 DW_{86}	—	February 22, 2001	Kitt Peak	Spacewatch	·	1.0 km	MPC · JPL
420466	2012 DX_{86}	—	January 23, 2006	Kitt Peak	Spacewatch	·	3.3 km	MPC · JPL
420467	2012 DZ_{86}	—	February 23, 2012	Kitt Peak	Spacewatch	·	950 m	MPC · JPL
420468	2012 DR_{87}	—	December 5, 2007	Mount Lemmon	Mount Lemmon Survey	·	2.5 km	MPC · JPL
420469	2012 DN_{88}	—	March 7, 2005	Socorro	LINEAR	·	730 m	MPC · JPL
420470	2012 DW_{88}	—	February 9, 2005	Kitt Peak	Spacewatch	·	740 m	MPC · JPL
420471	2012 DS_{89}	—	January 10, 2007	Kitt Peak	Spacewatch	·	2.4 km	MPC · JPL
420472	2012 DR_{91}	—	December 31, 2007	Mount Lemmon	Mount Lemmon Survey	·	1.0 km	MPC · JPL
420473	2012 DC_{94}	—	January 21, 2012	Kitt Peak	Spacewatch	·	940 m	MPC · JPL
420474	2012 DH_{96}	—	October 8, 2010	Kitt Peak	Spacewatch	·	940 m	MPC · JPL
420475	2012 DZ_{97}	—	April 17, 2005	Catalina	CSS	PHO	1.3 km	MPC · JPL
420476	2012 EP	—	April 4, 2005	Mount Lemmon	Mount Lemmon Survey	·	940 m	MPC · JPL
420477	2012 EX	—	August 9, 2005	Cerro Tololo	Deep Ecliptic Survey	·	1.2 km	MPC · JPL
420478	2012 EQ_{1}	—	August 14, 2001	Haleakala	NEAT	·	1.4 km	MPC · JPL
420479	2012 EX_{2}	—	March 11, 2005	Mount Lemmon	Mount Lemmon Survey	·	880 m	MPC · JPL
420480	2012 EF_{3}	—	November 2, 2007	Mount Lemmon	Mount Lemmon Survey	·	630 m	MPC · JPL
420481	2012 EW_{3}	—	October 28, 2010	Catalina	CSS	·	1.3 km	MPC · JPL
420482	2012 EU_{5}	—	September 25, 2006	Mount Lemmon	Mount Lemmon Survey	·	1.1 km	MPC · JPL
420483	2012 EP_{7}	—	September 19, 2006	Kitt Peak	Spacewatch	MAS	850 m	MPC · JPL
420484	2012 EW_{7}	—	April 1, 2005	Kitt Peak	Spacewatch	·	900 m	MPC · JPL
420485	2012 EP_{8}	—	November 23, 2006	Kitt Peak	Spacewatch	·	1.7 km	MPC · JPL
420486	2012 EH_{9}	—	December 1, 2003	Kitt Peak	Spacewatch	·	1.1 km	MPC · JPL
420487	2012 ED_{16}	—	November 16, 2006	Mount Lemmon	Mount Lemmon Survey	·	2.0 km	MPC · JPL
420488	2012 EP_{16}	—	January 11, 2008	Kitt Peak	Spacewatch	·	1.3 km	MPC · JPL
420489	2012 FF_{2}	—	December 16, 2007	Mount Lemmon	Mount Lemmon Survey	V	630 m	MPC · JPL
420490	2012 FM_{4}	—	September 18, 2003	Palomar	NEAT	·	1.2 km	MPC · JPL
420491	2012 FC_{6}	—	December 18, 2007	Mount Lemmon	Mount Lemmon Survey	·	1.1 km	MPC · JPL
420492	2012 FZ_{6}	—	April 5, 2005	Mount Lemmon	Mount Lemmon Survey	·	800 m	MPC · JPL
420493	2012 FG_{10}	—	January 12, 2011	Mount Lemmon	Mount Lemmon Survey	·	2.5 km	MPC · JPL
420494	2012 FB_{11}	—	March 31, 2003	Kitt Peak	Spacewatch	·	2.0 km	MPC · JPL
420495	2012 FJ_{11}	—	October 28, 2005	Mount Lemmon	Mount Lemmon Survey	·	2.6 km	MPC · JPL
420496	2012 FK_{14}	—	October 2, 2003	Kitt Peak	Spacewatch	·	4.2 km	MPC · JPL
420497	2012 FR_{14}	—	August 16, 2004	Palomar	NEAT	·	2.4 km	MPC · JPL
420498	2012 FW_{14}	—	August 23, 2003	Palomar	NEAT	EOS	2.6 km	MPC · JPL
420499	2012 FW_{15}	—	January 11, 2008	Mount Lemmon	Mount Lemmon Survey	·	980 m	MPC · JPL
420500	2012 FA_{17}	—	September 15, 2009	Kitt Peak	Spacewatch	GEF	1.6 km	MPC · JPL

== 420501–420600 ==
back to top

Designation			Discovery			Properties		Ref
Permanent	Provisional	Named after	Date	Site	Discoverer(s)	Category	Diam.	Ref
420501	2012 FN_{25}	—	September 26, 2006	Mount Lemmon	Mount Lemmon Survey	V	830 m	MPC · JPL
420502	2012 FE_{28}	—	October 12, 2009	Mount Lemmon	Mount Lemmon Survey	·	4.4 km	MPC · JPL
420503	2012 FD_{35}	—	December 21, 2006	Kitt Peak	Spacewatch	MIS	2.6 km	MPC · JPL
420504	2012 FG_{35}	—	March 11, 2008	Kitt Peak	Spacewatch	·	1.0 km	MPC · JPL
420505	2012 FU_{36}	—	October 6, 2005	Kitt Peak	Spacewatch	·	1.6 km	MPC · JPL
420506	2012 FQ_{37}	—	February 1, 2006	Kitt Peak	Spacewatch	·	3.0 km	MPC · JPL
420507	2012 FQ_{38}	—	April 6, 2008	Kitt Peak	Spacewatch	·	1.6 km	MPC · JPL
420508	2012 FU_{38}	—	December 4, 2002	Kitt Peak	Deep Ecliptic Survey	·	1.3 km	MPC · JPL
420509	2012 FA_{39}	—	February 27, 2008	Mount Lemmon	Mount Lemmon Survey	·	2.8 km	MPC · JPL
420510	2012 FB_{40}	—	September 30, 2009	Mount Lemmon	Mount Lemmon Survey	GEF	1.5 km	MPC · JPL
420511	2012 FG_{40}	—	December 18, 2007	Mount Lemmon	Mount Lemmon Survey	·	1.4 km	MPC · JPL
420512	2012 FQ_{41}	—	February 24, 2008	Mount Lemmon	Mount Lemmon Survey	·	960 m	MPC · JPL
420513	2012 FR_{41}	—	November 3, 2007	Mount Lemmon	Mount Lemmon Survey	·	1.0 km	MPC · JPL
420514	2012 FK_{42}	—	March 16, 2005	Catalina	CSS	·	1.0 km	MPC · JPL
420515	2012 FA_{44}	—	May 10, 2003	Kitt Peak	Spacewatch	·	3.0 km	MPC · JPL
420516	2012 FK_{48}	—	August 30, 2005	Kitt Peak	Spacewatch	·	1.3 km	MPC · JPL
420517	2012 FN_{49}	—	May 3, 2008	Kitt Peak	Spacewatch	·	1.6 km	MPC · JPL
420518	2012 FR_{49}	—	December 18, 2007	Mount Lemmon	Mount Lemmon Survey	NYS	1.0 km	MPC · JPL
420519	2012 FL_{51}	—	January 19, 2008	Mount Lemmon	Mount Lemmon Survey	·	980 m	MPC · JPL
420520	2012 FE_{57}	—	August 28, 2009	Kitt Peak	Spacewatch	·	2.3 km	MPC · JPL
420521	2012 FX_{58}	—	December 19, 2007	Mount Lemmon	Mount Lemmon Survey	V	670 m	MPC · JPL
420522	2012 FY_{58}	—	March 24, 2012	Catalina	CSS	·	2.0 km	MPC · JPL
420523	2012 FH_{59}	—	October 27, 2003	Kitt Peak	Spacewatch	·	1.1 km	MPC · JPL
420524	2012 FB_{60}	—	January 10, 2007	Kitt Peak	Spacewatch	·	2.2 km	MPC · JPL
420525	2012 FJ_{63}	—	March 26, 2012	Mount Lemmon	Mount Lemmon Survey	·	2.9 km	MPC · JPL
420526	2012 FM_{63}	—	April 16, 2004	Kitt Peak	Spacewatch	·	910 m	MPC · JPL
420527	2012 FF_{65}	—	December 30, 2007	Kitt Peak	Spacewatch	NYS	810 m	MPC · JPL
420528	2012 FG_{66}	—	December 5, 2010	Mount Lemmon	Mount Lemmon Survey	·	1.3 km	MPC · JPL
420529	2012 FP_{68}	—	February 18, 2008	Mount Lemmon	Mount Lemmon Survey	·	1.1 km	MPC · JPL
420530	2012 FJ_{69}	—	December 9, 2010	Mount Lemmon	Mount Lemmon Survey	·	2.5 km	MPC · JPL
420531	2012 FN_{71}	—	January 26, 2011	Mount Lemmon	Mount Lemmon Survey	·	2.2 km	MPC · JPL
420532	2012 FF_{72}	—	October 28, 2005	Mount Lemmon	Mount Lemmon Survey	·	2.0 km	MPC · JPL
420533	2012 FB_{73}	—	April 2, 2002	Eskridge	G. Hug	·	800 m	MPC · JPL
420534	2012 FO_{73}	—	December 3, 2007	Kitt Peak	Spacewatch	·	890 m	MPC · JPL
420535	2012 FE_{75}	—	March 15, 2008	Mount Lemmon	Mount Lemmon Survey	·	2.1 km	MPC · JPL
420536	2012 FG_{76}	—	September 15, 2010	Mount Lemmon	Mount Lemmon Survey	·	970 m	MPC · JPL
420537	2012 FR_{81}	—	September 27, 2009	Catalina	CSS	·	3.8 km	MPC · JPL
420538	2012 GC_{4}	—	October 6, 2005	Mount Lemmon	Mount Lemmon Survey	·	1.4 km	MPC · JPL
420539	2012 GG_{7}	—	March 16, 2012	Kitt Peak	Spacewatch	·	2.6 km	MPC · JPL
420540	2012 GF_{16}	—	November 16, 2010	Mount Lemmon	Mount Lemmon Survey	·	1.3 km	MPC · JPL
420541	2012 GW_{16}	—	September 11, 2010	Mount Lemmon	Mount Lemmon Survey	·	2.3 km	MPC · JPL
420542	2012 GK_{17}	—	August 27, 2009	Kitt Peak	Spacewatch	·	1.5 km	MPC · JPL
420543	2012 GD_{18}	—	March 27, 2012	Kitt Peak	Spacewatch	·	1.7 km	MPC · JPL
420544	2012 GF_{18}	—	October 29, 2010	Mount Lemmon	Mount Lemmon Survey	MAR	1.2 km	MPC · JPL
420545	2012 GG_{18}	—	June 16, 2005	Mount Lemmon	Mount Lemmon Survey	·	1.4 km	MPC · JPL
420546	2012 GE_{19}	—	March 13, 2007	Mount Lemmon	Mount Lemmon Survey	·	2.2 km	MPC · JPL
420547	2012 GU_{19}	—	December 9, 2010	Mount Lemmon	Mount Lemmon Survey	EUN	1.4 km	MPC · JPL
420548	2012 GS_{20}	—	December 14, 2010	Mount Lemmon	Mount Lemmon Survey	·	2.3 km	MPC · JPL
420549	2012 GP_{21}	—	April 1, 2008	Kitt Peak	Spacewatch	·	1.3 km	MPC · JPL
420550	2012 GW_{21}	—	December 21, 2006	Kitt Peak	Spacewatch	·	1.9 km	MPC · JPL
420551	2012 GM_{22}	—	March 16, 2012	Kitt Peak	Spacewatch	·	3.1 km	MPC · JPL
420552	2012 GL_{23}	—	September 26, 2005	Kitt Peak	Spacewatch	·	2.2 km	MPC · JPL
420553	2012 GR_{24}	—	March 26, 2007	Kitt Peak	Spacewatch	·	1.5 km	MPC · JPL
420554	2012 GA_{25}	—	March 27, 2012	Kitt Peak	Spacewatch	VER	2.9 km	MPC · JPL
420555	2012 GZ_{28}	—	February 23, 2007	Mount Lemmon	Mount Lemmon Survey	·	2.0 km	MPC · JPL
420556	2012 GC_{31}	—	January 29, 2003	Apache Point	SDSS	·	1.5 km	MPC · JPL
420557	2012 GD_{35}	—	September 21, 2009	Mount Lemmon	Mount Lemmon Survey	·	2.2 km	MPC · JPL
420558	2012 GR_{35}	—	September 28, 2003	Socorro	LINEAR	·	3.2 km	MPC · JPL
420559	2012 GP_{37}	—	January 27, 2007	Kitt Peak	Spacewatch	MRX	900 m	MPC · JPL
420560	2012 HN_{3}	—	October 18, 2006	Kitt Peak	Spacewatch	·	1.5 km	MPC · JPL
420561	2012 HR_{3}	—	April 11, 2007	Kitt Peak	Spacewatch	·	1.8 km	MPC · JPL
420562	2012 HN_{4}	—	February 16, 2004	Kitt Peak	Spacewatch	V	730 m	MPC · JPL
420563	2012 HO_{4}	—	January 12, 2011	Mount Lemmon	Mount Lemmon Survey	·	2.4 km	MPC · JPL
420564	2012 HX_{5}	—	May 3, 2008	Mount Lemmon	Mount Lemmon Survey	EUN	1.2 km	MPC · JPL
420565	2012 HP_{7}	—	October 23, 2009	Kitt Peak	Spacewatch	·	3.2 km	MPC · JPL
420566	2012 HJ_{9}	—	May 29, 2008	Kitt Peak	Spacewatch	·	1.7 km	MPC · JPL
420567	2012 HQ_{9}	—	April 9, 2003	Kitt Peak	Spacewatch	·	1.8 km	MPC · JPL
420568	2012 HU_{9}	—	October 5, 2002	Palomar	NEAT	·	3.7 km	MPC · JPL
420569	2012 HF_{11}	—	December 11, 2010	Kitt Peak	Spacewatch	·	2.1 km	MPC · JPL
420570	2012 HC_{15}	—	October 22, 2005	Kitt Peak	Spacewatch	·	2.2 km	MPC · JPL
420571	2012 HD_{16}	—	July 29, 2009	Kitt Peak	Spacewatch	PHO	1.0 km	MPC · JPL
420572	2012 HD_{17}	—	April 3, 1998	Kitt Peak	Spacewatch	·	890 m	MPC · JPL
420573	2012 HE_{17}	—	October 14, 2009	Mount Lemmon	Mount Lemmon Survey	·	3.5 km	MPC · JPL
420574	2012 HH_{18}	—	May 28, 2008	Kitt Peak	Spacewatch	EUN	860 m	MPC · JPL
420575	2012 HY_{18}	—	June 7, 2007	Kitt Peak	Spacewatch	·	4.6 km	MPC · JPL
420576	2012 HP_{22}	—	March 25, 2007	Mount Lemmon	Mount Lemmon Survey	·	2.1 km	MPC · JPL
420577	2012 HU_{24}	—	March 14, 2005	Siding Spring	SSS	·	980 m	MPC · JPL
420578	2012 HH_{25}	—	April 14, 2001	Socorro	LINEAR	·	1.4 km	MPC · JPL
420579	2012 HQ_{25}	—	November 8, 2010	Kitt Peak	Spacewatch	EUN	1.2 km	MPC · JPL
420580	2012 HB_{27}	—	February 7, 2008	Kitt Peak	Spacewatch	·	1.2 km	MPC · JPL
420581	2012 HG_{27}	—	May 8, 2008	Mount Lemmon	Mount Lemmon Survey	·	1.4 km	MPC · JPL
420582	2012 HL_{27}	—	January 26, 2003	Kitt Peak	Spacewatch	·	1.6 km	MPC · JPL
420583	2012 HT_{28}	—	November 5, 2010	Mount Lemmon	Mount Lemmon Survey	·	1.7 km	MPC · JPL
420584	2012 HW_{28}	—	February 6, 2008	Catalina	CSS	·	1.2 km	MPC · JPL
420585	2012 HX_{28}	—	April 14, 2008	Kitt Peak	Spacewatch	·	1.0 km	MPC · JPL
420586	2012 HD_{29}	—	September 22, 2009	Mount Lemmon	Mount Lemmon Survey	·	3.9 km	MPC · JPL
420587	2012 HK_{29}	—	May 24, 2007	Mount Lemmon	Mount Lemmon Survey	·	2.0 km	MPC · JPL
420588	2012 HM_{29}	—	April 20, 2012	Kitt Peak	Spacewatch	HYG	2.6 km	MPC · JPL
420589	2012 HD_{30}	—	December 21, 2006	Kitt Peak	L. H. Wasserman, M. W. Buie	·	1.5 km	MPC · JPL
420590	2012 HL_{30}	—	November 10, 2005	Mount Lemmon	Mount Lemmon Survey	·	2.1 km	MPC · JPL
420591	2012 HF_{31}	—	April 24, 2012	Haleakala	Pan-STARRS 1	APO	450 m	MPC · JPL
420592	2012 HT_{32}	—	January 25, 2011	Mount Lemmon	Mount Lemmon Survey	·	3.2 km	MPC · JPL
420593	2012 HO_{36}	—	October 23, 2003	Apache Point	SDSS	·	3.0 km	MPC · JPL
420594	2012 HQ_{37}	—	March 24, 2012	Kitt Peak	Spacewatch	KON	3.6 km	MPC · JPL
420595	2012 HM_{39}	—	September 21, 2009	Kitt Peak	Spacewatch	·	1.8 km	MPC · JPL
420596	2012 HF_{40}	—	February 4, 1995	Kitt Peak	Spacewatch	·	1.8 km	MPC · JPL
420597	2012 HK_{40}	—	February 6, 2003	Palomar	NEAT	·	2.4 km	MPC · JPL
420598	2012 HA_{42}	—	October 7, 2005	Kitt Peak	Spacewatch	·	1.3 km	MPC · JPL
420599	2012 HG_{43}	—	October 11, 2009	Mount Lemmon	Mount Lemmon Survey	·	2.3 km	MPC · JPL
420600	2012 HD_{45}	—	January 6, 2010	Mount Lemmon	Mount Lemmon Survey	VER	3.0 km	MPC · JPL

== 420601–420700 ==
back to top

Designation			Discovery			Properties		Ref
Permanent	Provisional	Named after	Date	Site	Discoverer(s)	Category	Diam.	Ref
420601	2012 HT_{45}	—	April 25, 2001	Anderson Mesa	LONEOS	·	3.6 km	MPC · JPL
420602	2012 HV_{46}	—	January 27, 2000	Kitt Peak	Spacewatch	·	1.5 km	MPC · JPL
420603	2012 HV_{48}	—	January 24, 2011	Mount Lemmon	Mount Lemmon Survey	·	2.1 km	MPC · JPL
420604	2012 HH_{50}	—	November 19, 2009	Kitt Peak	Spacewatch	EOS	1.7 km	MPC · JPL
420605	2012 HJ_{51}	—	December 20, 2004	Mount Lemmon	Mount Lemmon Survey	·	3.1 km	MPC · JPL
420606	2012 HB_{53}	—	May 5, 2008	Mount Lemmon	Mount Lemmon Survey	·	1.6 km	MPC · JPL
420607	2012 HL_{53}	—	February 25, 2007	Mount Lemmon	Mount Lemmon Survey	·	2.1 km	MPC · JPL
420608	2012 HM_{53}	—	December 23, 2006	Mount Lemmon	Mount Lemmon Survey	BRG	1.5 km	MPC · JPL
420609	2012 HQ_{55}	—	September 19, 2001	Socorro	LINEAR	·	2.0 km	MPC · JPL
420610	2012 HF_{59}	—	April 18, 2012	Kitt Peak	Spacewatch	·	3.5 km	MPC · JPL
420611	2012 HK_{59}	—	April 1, 2003	Apache Point	SDSS	·	1.7 km	MPC · JPL
420612 Nuptel	2012 HK_{60}	Nuptel	February 6, 2008	XuYi	PMO NEO Survey Program	·	1.4 km	MPC · JPL
420613	2012 HK_{61}	—	March 26, 2010	WISE	WISE	·	4.0 km	MPC · JPL
420614	2012 HB_{62}	—	March 28, 1995	Kitt Peak	Spacewatch	VER	3.3 km	MPC · JPL
420615	2012 HJ_{63}	—	March 27, 2008	Kitt Peak	Spacewatch	·	1.3 km	MPC · JPL
420616	2012 HP_{64}	—	October 11, 2004	Kitt Peak	Spacewatch	KOR	1.2 km	MPC · JPL
420617	2012 HV_{64}	—	October 21, 2006	Mount Lemmon	Mount Lemmon Survey	PHO	860 m	MPC · JPL
420618	2012 HJ_{65}	—	November 27, 2010	Mount Lemmon	Mount Lemmon Survey	·	1.2 km	MPC · JPL
420619	2012 HK_{66}	—	January 30, 2008	Kitt Peak	Spacewatch	·	830 m	MPC · JPL
420620	2012 HT_{67}	—	May 28, 2003	Kitt Peak	Spacewatch	·	1.8 km	MPC · JPL
420621	2012 HD_{68}	—	April 27, 2003	Anderson Mesa	LONEOS	·	4.3 km	MPC · JPL
420622	2012 HA_{69}	—	December 27, 2006	Kitt Peak	Spacewatch	·	1.4 km	MPC · JPL
420623	2012 HP_{69}	—	May 9, 2006	Mount Lemmon	Mount Lemmon Survey	CYB	3.8 km	MPC · JPL
420624	2012 HL_{70}	—	March 29, 2012	Mount Lemmon	Mount Lemmon Survey	·	3.2 km	MPC · JPL
420625	2012 HC_{71}	—	April 22, 2007	Kitt Peak	Spacewatch	TRE	3.9 km	MPC · JPL
420626	2012 HF_{72}	—	March 4, 2010	WISE	WISE	·	3.6 km	MPC · JPL
420627	2012 HG_{72}	—	March 18, 2004	Palomar	NEAT	·	1.4 km	MPC · JPL
420628	2012 HN_{73}	—	May 9, 2006	Mount Lemmon	Mount Lemmon Survey	CYB	3.7 km	MPC · JPL
420629	2012 HN_{74}	—	December 3, 2005	Kitt Peak	Spacewatch	·	2.2 km	MPC · JPL
420630	2012 HE_{76}	—	September 7, 2008	Mount Lemmon	Mount Lemmon Survey	·	2.4 km	MPC · JPL
420631	2012 HF_{76}	—	September 17, 2009	Mount Lemmon	Mount Lemmon Survey	·	1.8 km	MPC · JPL
420632	2012 HH_{78}	—	December 20, 2006	Palomar	NEAT	·	1.9 km	MPC · JPL
420633	2012 HD_{79}	—	February 8, 2007	Kitt Peak	Spacewatch	EUN	1.6 km	MPC · JPL
420634	2012 HK_{79}	—	December 8, 2005	Kitt Peak	Spacewatch	·	2.4 km	MPC · JPL
420635	2012 HP_{83}	—	February 10, 2002	Socorro	LINEAR	·	2.5 km	MPC · JPL
420636	2012 JC_{1}	—	November 2, 2007	Mount Lemmon	Mount Lemmon Survey	·	770 m	MPC · JPL
420637	2012 JL_{1}	—	October 7, 2008	Mount Lemmon	Mount Lemmon Survey	·	3.6 km	MPC · JPL
420638	2012 JY_{1}	—	March 13, 2003	Kitt Peak	Spacewatch	·	1.5 km	MPC · JPL
420639	2012 JZ_{4}	—	December 16, 2007	Catalina	CSS	PHO	2.6 km	MPC · JPL
420640	2012 JD_{7}	—	April 20, 2012	Kitt Peak	Spacewatch	·	1.5 km	MPC · JPL
420641	2012 JF_{7}	—	January 10, 2007	Kitt Peak	Spacewatch	·	1.5 km	MPC · JPL
420642	2012 JO_{7}	—	March 17, 2004	Socorro	LINEAR	·	1.4 km	MPC · JPL
420643	2012 JA_{8}	—	April 18, 2007	Kitt Peak	Spacewatch	·	1.9 km	MPC · JPL
420644	2012 JF_{8}	—	October 22, 2003	Kitt Peak	Spacewatch	·	2.8 km	MPC · JPL
420645	2012 JK_{8}	—	November 10, 2006	Kitt Peak	Spacewatch	·	1.5 km	MPC · JPL
420646	2012 JW_{10}	—	April 25, 2007	Kitt Peak	Spacewatch	EOS	2.2 km	MPC · JPL
420647	2012 JC_{11}	—	December 25, 2005	Kitt Peak	Spacewatch	HOF	2.7 km	MPC · JPL
420648	2012 JD_{11}	—	February 10, 2008	Catalina	CSS	PHO	950 m	MPC · JPL
420649	2012 JO_{15}	—	October 2, 2008	Kitt Peak	Spacewatch	·	2.7 km	MPC · JPL
420650	2012 JZ_{16}	—	March 16, 2007	Kitt Peak	Spacewatch	·	1.7 km	MPC · JPL
420651	2012 JC_{18}	—	November 1, 2000	Kitt Peak	Spacewatch	·	1.9 km	MPC · JPL
420652	2012 JS_{21}	—	November 14, 2006	Mount Lemmon	Mount Lemmon Survey	·	1.5 km	MPC · JPL
420653	2012 JK_{22}	—	January 31, 2003	Socorro	LINEAR	·	1.5 km	MPC · JPL
420654	2012 JU_{23}	—	May 12, 2012	Mount Lemmon	Mount Lemmon Survey	PHO	1.2 km	MPC · JPL
420655	2012 JA_{24}	—	November 24, 2006	Mount Lemmon	Mount Lemmon Survey	·	2.5 km	MPC · JPL
420656	2012 JP_{24}	—	November 18, 2007	Kitt Peak	Spacewatch	·	1.3 km	MPC · JPL
420657	2012 JA_{25}	—	September 24, 2008	Kitt Peak	Spacewatch	·	2.3 km	MPC · JPL
420658	2012 JX_{25}	—	January 24, 2007	Socorro	LINEAR	·	1.2 km	MPC · JPL
420659	2012 JM_{26}	—	July 11, 2001	Palomar	NEAT	T_{j} (2.98)	4.7 km	MPC · JPL
420660	2012 JA_{27}	—	November 26, 2009	Mount Lemmon	Mount Lemmon Survey	·	5.6 km	MPC · JPL
420661	2012 JY_{28}	—	February 19, 2010	WISE	WISE	·	4.6 km	MPC · JPL
420662	2012 JC_{35}	—	September 22, 2009	Kitt Peak	Spacewatch	·	2.1 km	MPC · JPL
420663	2012 JD_{37}	—	January 23, 2006	Kitt Peak	Spacewatch	KOR	1.6 km	MPC · JPL
420664	2012 JD_{42}	—	September 18, 2009	Kitt Peak	Spacewatch	·	2.1 km	MPC · JPL
420665	2012 JH_{46}	—	May 1, 2003	Kitt Peak	Spacewatch	·	1.7 km	MPC · JPL
420666	2012 JZ_{51}	—	January 7, 2006	Mount Lemmon	Mount Lemmon Survey	·	1.8 km	MPC · JPL
420667	2012 JK_{54}	—	March 10, 2007	Kitt Peak	Spacewatch	·	1.2 km	MPC · JPL
420668	2012 JR_{57}	—	February 25, 2011	Mount Lemmon	Mount Lemmon Survey	·	2.4 km	MPC · JPL
420669	2012 JP_{62}	—	May 14, 2007	Mount Lemmon	Mount Lemmon Survey	EOS	1.7 km	MPC · JPL
420670	2012 JP_{64}	—	December 14, 2001	Socorro	LINEAR	·	1.8 km	MPC · JPL
420671	2012 JG_{65}	—	March 24, 2006	Kitt Peak	Spacewatch	THM	2.7 km	MPC · JPL
420672	2012 KS	—	March 4, 2006	Kitt Peak	Spacewatch	·	1.9 km	MPC · JPL
420673	2012 KA_{2}	—	December 10, 2009	Mount Lemmon	Mount Lemmon Survey	·	3.1 km	MPC · JPL
420674	2012 KR_{2}	—	November 27, 2009	Mount Lemmon	Mount Lemmon Survey	·	4.3 km	MPC · JPL
420675	2012 KW_{8}	—	December 28, 2005	Mount Lemmon	Mount Lemmon Survey	·	1.9 km	MPC · JPL
420676	2012 KQ_{10}	—	October 12, 2009	Mount Lemmon	Mount Lemmon Survey	·	2.6 km	MPC · JPL
420677	2012 KT_{14}	—	February 25, 2006	Kitt Peak	Spacewatch	·	2.7 km	MPC · JPL
420678	2012 KO_{15}	—	December 28, 2005	Kitt Peak	Spacewatch	·	1.9 km	MPC · JPL
420679	2012 KT_{15}	—	October 27, 2005	Catalina	CSS	·	2.0 km	MPC · JPL
420680	2012 KB_{23}	—	May 7, 2008	Kitt Peak	Spacewatch	·	1.7 km	MPC · JPL
420681	2012 KJ_{23}	—	April 19, 2006	Mount Lemmon	Mount Lemmon Survey	·	2.9 km	MPC · JPL
420682	2012 KF_{24}	—	January 27, 2006	Kitt Peak	Spacewatch	·	2.0 km	MPC · JPL
420683	2012 KD_{25}	—	January 17, 2010	WISE	WISE	·	3.5 km	MPC · JPL
420684	2012 KU_{26}	—	February 11, 2008	Kitt Peak	Spacewatch	·	1.1 km	MPC · JPL
420685	2012 KW_{27}	—	September 23, 2008	Kitt Peak	Spacewatch	·	3.2 km	MPC · JPL
420686	2012 KD_{28}	—	October 29, 2005	Mount Lemmon	Mount Lemmon Survey	·	2.1 km	MPC · JPL
420687	2012 KW_{28}	—	December 10, 2009	Mount Lemmon	Mount Lemmon Survey	·	3.0 km	MPC · JPL
420688	2012 KF_{30}	—	November 3, 2005	Catalina	CSS	·	1.6 km	MPC · JPL
420689	2012 KO_{30}	—	December 3, 2004	Kitt Peak	Spacewatch	·	3.9 km	MPC · JPL
420690	2012 KE_{31}	—	May 1, 2003	Kitt Peak	Spacewatch	·	2.1 km	MPC · JPL
420691	2012 KJ_{31}	—	March 26, 2007	Mount Lemmon	Mount Lemmon Survey	KOR	1.1 km	MPC · JPL
420692	2012 KP_{31}	—	August 22, 2004	Kitt Peak	Spacewatch	·	1.5 km	MPC · JPL
420693	2012 KS_{31}	—	October 7, 2008	Mount Lemmon	Mount Lemmon Survey	·	2.6 km	MPC · JPL
420694	2012 KB_{35}	—	October 20, 2003	Kitt Peak	Spacewatch	·	2.5 km	MPC · JPL
420695	2012 KC_{35}	—	September 16, 2003	Kitt Peak	Spacewatch	·	2.3 km	MPC · JPL
420696	2012 KF_{42}	—	February 25, 2007	Mount Lemmon	Mount Lemmon Survey	·	1.7 km	MPC · JPL
420697	2012 KS_{43}	—	October 26, 2009	Kitt Peak	Spacewatch	AGN	1.1 km	MPC · JPL
420698	2012 KP_{46}	—	January 1, 2009	Mount Lemmon	Mount Lemmon Survey	·	4.4 km	MPC · JPL
420699	2012 KD_{47}	—	June 12, 2004	Palomar	NEAT	·	2.5 km	MPC · JPL
420700	2012 KW_{47}	—	February 2, 2010	WISE	WISE	EUN	1.3 km	MPC · JPL

== 420701–420800 ==
back to top

Designation			Discovery			Properties		Ref
Permanent	Provisional	Named after	Date	Site	Discoverer(s)	Category	Diam.	Ref
420701	2012 KA_{49}	—	February 25, 2006	Mount Lemmon	Mount Lemmon Survey	·	3.3 km	MPC · JPL
420702	2012 LN_{1}	—	January 15, 2011	Mount Lemmon	Mount Lemmon Survey	·	2.8 km	MPC · JPL
420703	2012 LB_{5}	—	March 15, 2010	WISE	WISE	·	4.0 km	MPC · JPL
420704	2012 LF_{9}	—	March 9, 2011	Mount Lemmon	Mount Lemmon Survey	·	3.1 km	MPC · JPL
420705	2012 LA_{14}	—	January 28, 2007	Catalina	CSS	·	2.1 km	MPC · JPL
420706	2012 LW_{15}	—	December 2, 2010	Mount Lemmon	Mount Lemmon Survey	·	3.8 km	MPC · JPL
420707	2012 LD_{16}	—	February 10, 2011	Mount Lemmon	Mount Lemmon Survey	THM	2.5 km	MPC · JPL
420708	2012 LU_{18}	—	November 24, 2003	Kitt Peak	Spacewatch	·	3.5 km	MPC · JPL
420709	2012 LB_{19}	—	May 19, 2012	Mount Lemmon	Mount Lemmon Survey	·	2.0 km	MPC · JPL
420710	2012 LN_{21}	—	January 7, 2010	Mount Lemmon	Mount Lemmon Survey	·	3.3 km	MPC · JPL
420711	2012 LC_{23}	—	September 29, 2005	Siding Spring	SSS	·	1.7 km	MPC · JPL
420712	2012 LA_{26}	—	February 8, 2007	Palomar	NEAT	·	3.0 km	MPC · JPL
420713	2012 MY	—	September 23, 2008	Mount Lemmon	Mount Lemmon Survey	·	3.4 km	MPC · JPL
420714	2012 MG_{5}	—	April 21, 2012	Mount Lemmon	Mount Lemmon Survey	·	3.3 km	MPC · JPL
420715	2012 ML_{7}	—	June 9, 2011	Mount Lemmon	Mount Lemmon Survey	L5	10 km	MPC · JPL
420716	2012 OL_{1}	—	March 5, 1994	Kitt Peak	Spacewatch	L5	10 km	MPC · JPL
420717	2012 PA_{6}	—	February 3, 2009	Mount Lemmon	Mount Lemmon Survey	3:2	6.3 km	MPC · JPL
420718	2012 PN_{11}	—	December 21, 2003	Kitt Peak	Spacewatch	(21885)	4.4 km	MPC · JPL
420719	2012 PS_{15}	—	January 21, 2002	Kitt Peak	Spacewatch	·	2.5 km	MPC · JPL
420720	2012 PD_{23}	—	May 28, 2010	WISE	WISE	VER	3.2 km	MPC · JPL
420721	2012 PC_{34}	—	October 22, 2008	Kitt Peak	Spacewatch	EOS	2.6 km	MPC · JPL
420722	2012 PA_{41}	—	April 12, 2005	Anderson Mesa	LONEOS	·	3.7 km	MPC · JPL
420723	2012 QF_{9}	—	March 15, 2010	Catalina	CSS	·	3.5 km	MPC · JPL
420724	2012 QY_{12}	—	October 14, 2001	Kitt Peak	Spacewatch	·	3.7 km	MPC · JPL
420725	2012 QS_{19}	—	March 13, 2010	Catalina	CSS	·	5.0 km	MPC · JPL
420726	2012 QH_{21}	—	June 27, 2011	Kitt Peak	Spacewatch	L5	7.7 km	MPC · JPL
420727	2012 QE_{31}	—	April 14, 2008	Mount Lemmon	Mount Lemmon Survey	L5	8.3 km	MPC · JPL
420728	2012 RO_{2}	—	July 26, 2011	Haleakala	Pan-STARRS 1	L5	10 km	MPC · JPL
420729	2012 RL_{17}	—	August 3, 2008	Siding Spring	SSS	PHO	1.4 km	MPC · JPL
420730	2012 RR_{36}	—	October 15, 1996	Kitt Peak	Spacewatch	EOS	1.9 km	MPC · JPL
420731	2012 SP_{6}	—	March 15, 2007	Kitt Peak	Spacewatch	L5	9.5 km	MPC · JPL
420732	2012 SR_{34}	—	March 15, 2004	Kitt Peak	Spacewatch	·	3.7 km	MPC · JPL
420733	2012 SU_{34}	—	April 6, 2010	Catalina	CSS	·	4.2 km	MPC · JPL
420734	2012 SN_{49}	—	March 26, 2004	Kitt Peak	Spacewatch	·	3.2 km	MPC · JPL
420735	2012 TG	—	December 5, 2002	Kitt Peak	Spacewatch	L5	8.2 km	MPC · JPL
420736	2012 TM	—	February 25, 2007	Mount Lemmon	Mount Lemmon Survey	L5	8.7 km	MPC · JPL
420737	2012 TO	—	March 20, 2007	Mount Lemmon	Mount Lemmon Survey	L5	7.9 km	MPC · JPL
420738	2012 TS	—	October 4, 2012	Catalina	CSS	ATE	240 m	MPC · JPL
420739	2012 TK_{52}	—	February 21, 2006	Mount Lemmon	Mount Lemmon Survey	L5	8.6 km	MPC · JPL
420740	2012 TY_{122}	—	May 31, 2011	Mount Lemmon	Mount Lemmon Survey	L5	8.0 km	MPC · JPL
420741	2012 TA_{124}	—	May 5, 2008	Mount Lemmon	Mount Lemmon Survey	L5	8.3 km	MPC · JPL
420742	2012 TY_{142}	—	September 4, 2000	Kitt Peak	Spacewatch	L5	7.4 km	MPC · JPL
420743	2012 TS_{146}	—	May 28, 2008	Mount Lemmon	Mount Lemmon Survey	L5	8.5 km	MPC · JPL
420744	2012 TA_{289}	—	April 14, 2008	Kitt Peak	Spacewatch	L5	8.2 km	MPC · JPL
420745	2012 TN_{314}	—	April 20, 2010	Mount Lemmon	Mount Lemmon Survey	·	4.5 km	MPC · JPL
420746	2012 TF_{315}	—	November 17, 2007	Mount Lemmon	Mount Lemmon Survey	·	6.7 km	MPC · JPL
420747	2012 TZ_{322}	—	March 20, 1999	Apache Point	SDSS	·	3.1 km	MPC · JPL
420748	2012 UM_{140}	—	April 27, 2010	WISE	WISE	L5	9.5 km	MPC · JPL
420749	2012 XU_{93}	—	September 18, 2012	Mount Lemmon	Mount Lemmon Survey	L5	10 km	MPC · JPL
420750	2012 YZ_{1}	—	February 22, 2006	Catalina	CSS	·	1.1 km	MPC · JPL
420751	2013 AZ_{54}	—	January 6, 2005	Socorro	LINEAR	H	720 m	MPC · JPL
420752	2013 AN_{91}	—	November 6, 2010	Catalina	CSS	L4	10 km	MPC · JPL
420753	2013 AW_{131}	—	June 26, 2007	Kitt Peak	Spacewatch	L4	10 km	MPC · JPL
420754	2013 EL	—	December 10, 2004	Socorro	LINEAR	H	690 m	MPC · JPL
420755	2013 EU	—	July 23, 2011	Siding Spring	SSS	H	870 m	MPC · JPL
420756	2013 EW_{4}	—	October 23, 2006	Catalina	CSS	H	570 m	MPC · JPL
420757	2013 EL_{22}	—	June 10, 2010	Mount Lemmon	Mount Lemmon Survey	·	1.1 km	MPC · JPL
420758	2013 EL_{23}	—	February 18, 2008	Mount Lemmon	Mount Lemmon Survey	H	390 m	MPC · JPL
420759	2013 EX_{26}	—	June 11, 2004	Kitt Peak	Spacewatch	·	1.6 km	MPC · JPL
420760	2013 EM_{41}	—	August 20, 2003	Campo Imperatore	CINEOS	H	550 m	MPC · JPL
420761	2013 EQ_{113}	—	February 27, 2006	Kitt Peak	Spacewatch	·	1 km	MPC · JPL
420762	2013 FG_{7}	—	October 9, 2007	Mount Lemmon	Mount Lemmon Survey	·	930 m	MPC · JPL
420763	2013 FF_{14}	—	April 6, 2005	Catalina	CSS	(5)	1.4 km	MPC · JPL
420764	2013 FP_{15}	—	January 13, 2008	Kitt Peak	Spacewatch	·	1.6 km	MPC · JPL
420765	2013 FX_{22}	—	September 14, 2004	Anderson Mesa	LONEOS	·	790 m	MPC · JPL
420766	2013 GS_{1}	—	September 10, 2004	Kitt Peak	Spacewatch	·	670 m	MPC · JPL
420767	2013 GX_{7}	—	May 10, 2003	Kitt Peak	Spacewatch	H	370 m	MPC · JPL
420768	2013 GR_{20}	—	October 10, 2001	Kitt Peak	Spacewatch	·	1.7 km	MPC · JPL
420769	2013 GC_{21}	—	May 10, 2003	Kitt Peak	Spacewatch	·	700 m	MPC · JPL
420770	2013 GJ_{26}	—	September 13, 2007	Kitt Peak	Spacewatch	·	1.8 km	MPC · JPL
420771	2013 GL_{32}	—	April 29, 2000	Socorro	LINEAR	·	730 m	MPC · JPL
420772	2013 GY_{37}	—	April 2, 2013	Catalina	CSS	·	880 m	MPC · JPL
420773	2013 GP_{48}	—	December 31, 2008	Mount Lemmon	Mount Lemmon Survey	·	740 m	MPC · JPL
420774	2013 GO_{49}	—	November 5, 2007	Kitt Peak	Spacewatch	·	940 m	MPC · JPL
420775	2013 GB_{50}	—	January 16, 2005	Kitt Peak	Spacewatch	·	1.4 km	MPC · JPL
420776	2013 GV_{53}	—	March 22, 2004	Socorro	LINEAR	·	1.6 km	MPC · JPL
420777	2013 GX_{63}	—	March 23, 2003	Kitt Peak	Spacewatch	·	610 m	MPC · JPL
420778	2013 GN_{75}	—	January 28, 2006	Mount Lemmon	Mount Lemmon Survey	·	790 m	MPC · JPL
420779 Świdwin	2013 GR_{75}	Świdwin	April 11, 2013	ESA OGS	ESA OGS	·	1.4 km	MPC · JPL
420780	2013 GQ_{76}	—	August 10, 2007	Kitt Peak	Spacewatch	·	720 m	MPC · JPL
420781	2013 GU_{83}	—	October 10, 2007	Mount Lemmon	Mount Lemmon Survey	·	1.1 km	MPC · JPL
420782	2013 GG_{87}	—	December 11, 2004	Kitt Peak	Spacewatch	·	850 m	MPC · JPL
420783	2013 GN_{87}	—	November 28, 2011	Kitt Peak	Spacewatch	·	1.3 km	MPC · JPL
420784	2013 GS_{87}	—	May 13, 2005	Kitt Peak	Spacewatch	·	1.4 km	MPC · JPL
420785	2013 GV_{88}	—	November 23, 2006	Kitt Peak	Spacewatch	JUN	1.0 km	MPC · JPL
420786	2013 GK_{92}	—	January 1, 2009	Kitt Peak	Spacewatch	·	910 m	MPC · JPL
420787	2013 GP_{93}	—	September 17, 2009	Kitt Peak	Spacewatch	·	2.5 km	MPC · JPL
420788	2013 GB_{97}	—	May 3, 1997	Kitt Peak	Spacewatch	·	680 m	MPC · JPL
420789	2013 GB_{100}	—	October 10, 2004	Kitt Peak	Spacewatch	·	700 m	MPC · JPL
420790	2013 GF_{104}	—	September 5, 2010	Mount Lemmon	Mount Lemmon Survey	·	1.1 km	MPC · JPL
420791	2013 GV_{109}	—	November 11, 2006	Kitt Peak	Spacewatch	EUN	1.3 km	MPC · JPL
420792	2013 GY_{117}	—	April 20, 2010	Kitt Peak	Spacewatch	·	580 m	MPC · JPL
420793	2013 GD_{126}	—	December 17, 2006	Mount Lemmon	Mount Lemmon Survey	·	1.6 km	MPC · JPL
420794	2013 GE_{132}	—	July 18, 2009	Siding Spring	SSS	·	1.9 km	MPC · JPL
420795	2013 GQ_{132}	—	April 25, 2006	Mount Lemmon	Mount Lemmon Survey	PHO	1.0 km	MPC · JPL
420796	2013 GV_{134}	—	March 1, 2009	Kitt Peak	Spacewatch	·	1.2 km	MPC · JPL
420797	2013 HN_{1}	—	September 14, 2007	Mount Lemmon	Mount Lemmon Survey	·	710 m	MPC · JPL
420798	2013 HW_{5}	—	May 2, 2006	Mount Lemmon	Mount Lemmon Survey	·	850 m	MPC · JPL
420799	2013 HC_{6}	—	April 18, 2013	Kitt Peak	Spacewatch	·	790 m	MPC · JPL
420800	2013 HD_{7}	—	January 17, 2008	Mount Lemmon	Mount Lemmon Survey	·	2.6 km	MPC · JPL

== 420801–420900 ==
back to top

Designation			Discovery			Properties		Ref
Permanent	Provisional	Named after	Date	Site	Discoverer(s)	Category	Diam.	Ref
420801	2013 HX_{7}	—	April 20, 2013	Mount Lemmon	Mount Lemmon Survey	H	720 m	MPC · JPL
420802	2013 HZ_{7}	—	December 11, 2006	Socorro	LINEAR	H	680 m	MPC · JPL
420803	2013 HV_{9}	—	April 17, 2009	Mount Lemmon	Mount Lemmon Survey	MAR	940 m	MPC · JPL
420804	2013 HD_{12}	—	September 26, 2003	Apache Point	SDSS	·	1.3 km	MPC · JPL
420805	2013 HB_{15}	—	May 28, 2008	Siding Spring	SSS	H	740 m	MPC · JPL
420806	2013 HD_{16}	—	September 26, 2011	Kitt Peak	Spacewatch	H	520 m	MPC · JPL
420807	2013 HU_{16}	—	March 19, 2009	Mount Lemmon	Mount Lemmon Survey	PHO	730 m	MPC · JPL
420808	2013 HX_{16}	—	October 14, 2001	Kitt Peak	Spacewatch	·	880 m	MPC · JPL
420809	2013 HU_{18}	—	December 21, 2006	Catalina	CSS	H	490 m	MPC · JPL
420810	2013 HC_{19}	—	October 1, 2003	Kitt Peak	Spacewatch	·	720 m	MPC · JPL
420811	2013 HE_{25}	—	September 19, 2003	Kitt Peak	Spacewatch	·	1.0 km	MPC · JPL
420812	2013 HC_{26}	—	October 17, 2006	Mount Lemmon	Mount Lemmon Survey	·	2.1 km	MPC · JPL
420813	2013 HD_{27}	—	October 21, 2007	Mount Lemmon	Mount Lemmon Survey	·	980 m	MPC · JPL
420814	2013 HW_{27}	—	April 20, 2002	Kitt Peak	Spacewatch	·	1.1 km	MPC · JPL
420815	2013 HX_{28}	—	December 21, 2006	Catalina	CSS	·	3.6 km	MPC · JPL
420816	2013 HD_{39}	—	September 13, 2004	Kitt Peak	Spacewatch	·	1.5 km	MPC · JPL
420817	2013 HD_{51}	—	September 11, 2007	Catalina	CSS	·	690 m	MPC · JPL
420818	2013 HW_{73}	—	October 22, 2003	Kitt Peak	Spacewatch	·	1.0 km	MPC · JPL
420819	2013 HG_{92}	—	May 19, 2010	WISE	WISE	·	2.1 km	MPC · JPL
420820	2013 HZ_{94}	—	September 24, 1960	Palomar	C. J. van Houten, I. van Houten-Groeneveld, T. Gehrels	·	900 m	MPC · JPL
420821	2013 HV_{95}	—	March 30, 2003	Kitt Peak	Deep Ecliptic Survey	·	710 m	MPC · JPL
420822	2013 HM_{101}	—	October 18, 2003	Kitt Peak	Spacewatch	·	590 m	MPC · JPL
420823	2013 HN_{108}	—	October 21, 1995	Kitt Peak	Spacewatch	H	390 m	MPC · JPL
420824	2013 HZ_{114}	—	October 19, 2003	Apache Point	SDSS	·	800 m	MPC · JPL
420825	2013 HS_{118}	—	May 7, 2002	Kitt Peak	Spacewatch	·	1.1 km	MPC · JPL
420826	2013 HM_{120}	—	October 5, 2003	Kitt Peak	Spacewatch	T_{j} (2.99)	2.6 km	MPC · JPL
420827	2013 HX_{128}	—	November 4, 2004	Kitt Peak	Spacewatch	·	770 m	MPC · JPL
420828	2013 JE	—	January 29, 2004	Socorro	LINEAR	·	1.4 km	MPC · JPL
420829	2013 JO	—	May 27, 2003	Kitt Peak	Spacewatch	H	480 m	MPC · JPL
420830	2013 JB_{1}	—	January 16, 2009	Kitt Peak	Spacewatch	V	800 m	MPC · JPL
420831	2013 JB_{8}	—	January 31, 2009	Mount Lemmon	Mount Lemmon Survey	·	960 m	MPC · JPL
420832	2013 JW_{8}	—	February 2, 2009	Kitt Peak	Spacewatch	·	710 m	MPC · JPL
420833	2013 JM_{10}	—	September 18, 2007	Kitt Peak	Spacewatch	·	690 m	MPC · JPL
420834	2013 JX_{10}	—	July 7, 2010	WISE	WISE	·	1.9 km	MPC · JPL
420835	2013 JX_{12}	—	October 16, 2007	Kitt Peak	Spacewatch	·	610 m	MPC · JPL
420836	2013 JU_{21}	—	December 5, 2007	Mount Lemmon	Mount Lemmon Survey	·	1.8 km	MPC · JPL
420837	2013 JW_{23}	—	October 12, 2010	Mount Lemmon	Mount Lemmon Survey	PAD	1.3 km	MPC · JPL
420838	2013 JU_{30}	—	February 5, 2009	Kitt Peak	Spacewatch	·	660 m	MPC · JPL
420839	2013 JM_{33}	—	March 28, 2009	Mount Lemmon	Mount Lemmon Survey	·	2.6 km	MPC · JPL
420840	2013 JW_{34}	—	May 14, 2005	Kitt Peak	Spacewatch	H	520 m	MPC · JPL
420841	2013 JK_{35}	—	May 3, 2006	Mount Lemmon	Mount Lemmon Survey	·	710 m	MPC · JPL
420842	2013 JE_{37}	—	March 3, 2009	Mount Lemmon	Mount Lemmon Survey	NYS	1.2 km	MPC · JPL
420843	2013 JV_{41}	—	April 25, 2006	Catalina	CSS	·	920 m	MPC · JPL
420844	2013 JC_{44}	—	May 11, 2013	Siding Spring	SSS	·	1.9 km	MPC · JPL
420845	2013 JH_{44}	—	August 13, 2009	Siding Spring	SSS	·	3.7 km	MPC · JPL
420846	2013 JK_{46}	—	September 28, 2001	Palomar	NEAT	·	1.6 km	MPC · JPL
420847	2013 JN_{47}	—	March 2, 2006	Kitt Peak	L. H. Wasserman, R. L. Millis	·	710 m	MPC · JPL
420848	2013 JP_{51}	—	October 12, 2007	Mount Lemmon	Mount Lemmon Survey	·	1.2 km	MPC · JPL
420849	2013 JH_{52}	—	May 24, 2006	Mount Lemmon	Mount Lemmon Survey	MAS	810 m	MPC · JPL
420850	2013 JH_{55}	—	November 17, 2006	Mount Lemmon	Mount Lemmon Survey	·	1.2 km	MPC · JPL
420851	2013 JN_{56}	—	November 6, 2010	Mount Lemmon	Mount Lemmon Survey	·	1.5 km	MPC · JPL
420852	2013 JS_{56}	—	July 8, 2010	Kitt Peak	Spacewatch	(2076)	880 m	MPC · JPL
420853	2013 JK_{59}	—	May 25, 2007	Mount Lemmon	Mount Lemmon Survey	·	740 m	MPC · JPL
420854	2013 JH_{61}	—	May 6, 2006	Mount Lemmon	Mount Lemmon Survey	V	560 m	MPC · JPL
420855	2013 JW_{62}	—	March 22, 2009	Mount Lemmon	Mount Lemmon Survey	·	1.2 km	MPC · JPL
420856	2013 JC_{63}	—	March 2, 2009	Mount Lemmon	Mount Lemmon Survey	·	1.9 km	MPC · JPL
420857	2013 JJ_{63}	—	November 14, 2006	Mount Lemmon	Mount Lemmon Survey	H	660 m	MPC · JPL
420858	2013 JM_{63}	—	January 27, 2011	Kitt Peak	Spacewatch	·	3.4 km	MPC · JPL
420859	2013 KW	—	October 9, 2010	Mount Lemmon	Mount Lemmon Survey	·	1.6 km	MPC · JPL
420860	2013 KG_{1}	—	September 11, 2010	Mount Lemmon	Mount Lemmon Survey	·	990 m	MPC · JPL
420861	2013 KE_{2}	—	November 7, 2007	Kitt Peak	Spacewatch	·	970 m	MPC · JPL
420862	2013 KY_{2}	—	April 24, 1993	Kitt Peak	Spacewatch	·	870 m	MPC · JPL
420863	2013 KG_{3}	—	February 6, 2002	Socorro	LINEAR	H	600 m	MPC · JPL
420864	2013 KD_{4}	—	March 26, 2006	Kitt Peak	Spacewatch	·	730 m	MPC · JPL
420865	2013 KD_{5}	—	March 24, 2006	Mount Lemmon	Mount Lemmon Survey	(2076)	860 m	MPC · JPL
420866	2013 KF_{5}	—	November 16, 2006	Kitt Peak	Spacewatch	·	1.9 km	MPC · JPL
420867	2013 KU_{5}	—	September 28, 2006	Mount Lemmon	Mount Lemmon Survey	EUN	1.4 km	MPC · JPL
420868	2013 KQ_{6}	—	December 18, 2003	Socorro	LINEAR	H	610 m	MPC · JPL
420869	2013 KT_{6}	—	February 15, 2001	Socorro	LINEAR	·	1.7 km	MPC · JPL
420870	2013 KA_{7}	—	September 24, 2007	Kitt Peak	Spacewatch	·	1.3 km	MPC · JPL
420871	2013 KS_{7}	—	October 29, 2005	Catalina	CSS	·	1.6 km	MPC · JPL
420872	2013 KW_{7}	—	April 8, 2006	Kitt Peak	Spacewatch	·	860 m	MPC · JPL
420873	2013 KY_{8}	—	November 7, 2010	Mount Lemmon	Mount Lemmon Survey	·	2.1 km	MPC · JPL
420874	2013 KV_{12}	—	April 22, 2002	Kitt Peak	Spacewatch	·	1.5 km	MPC · JPL
420875	2013 KX_{12}	—	November 5, 2007	Kitt Peak	Spacewatch	·	1.1 km	MPC · JPL
420876	2013 KU_{16}	—	May 16, 2013	Mount Lemmon	Mount Lemmon Survey	·	2.7 km	MPC · JPL
420877	2013 KJ_{18}	—	August 13, 2010	Siding Spring	SSS	·	810 m	MPC · JPL
420878	2013 KP_{18}	—	September 7, 1999	Socorro	LINEAR	·	1.3 km	MPC · JPL
420879	2013 LD	—	May 17, 1999	Kitt Peak	Spacewatch	H	560 m	MPC · JPL
420880	2013 LJ_{1}	—	October 25, 2005	Kitt Peak	Spacewatch	·	2.0 km	MPC · JPL
420881	2013 LT_{2}	—	May 3, 2008	Mount Lemmon	Mount Lemmon Survey	·	1.7 km	MPC · JPL
420882	2013 LE_{4}	—	December 21, 2006	Kitt Peak	Spacewatch	slow	1.7 km	MPC · JPL
420883	2013 LJ_{6}	—	October 8, 2004	Kitt Peak	Spacewatch	·	640 m	MPC · JPL
420884	2013 LB_{9}	—	November 6, 2010	Mount Lemmon	Mount Lemmon Survey	ADE	1.9 km	MPC · JPL
420885	2013 LL_{9}	—	August 29, 2006	Catalina	CSS	·	1.3 km	MPC · JPL
420886	2013 LY_{9}	—	September 14, 2004	Socorro	LINEAR	·	2.5 km	MPC · JPL
420887	2013 LV_{13}	—	December 8, 2010	Catalina	CSS	·	1.3 km	MPC · JPL
420888	2013 LB_{14}	—	October 4, 2002	Palomar	NEAT	·	1.5 km	MPC · JPL
420889	2013 LS_{14}	—	September 27, 2006	Mount Lemmon	Mount Lemmon Survey	·	1.1 km	MPC · JPL
420890	2013 LU_{15}	—	March 1, 2009	Mount Lemmon	Mount Lemmon Survey	V	670 m	MPC · JPL
420891	2013 LR_{17}	—	November 23, 2006	Kitt Peak	Spacewatch	RAF	970 m	MPC · JPL
420892	2013 LF_{21}	—	May 7, 2013	Kitt Peak	Spacewatch	·	890 m	MPC · JPL
420893	2013 LE_{22}	—	October 23, 2009	Mount Lemmon	Mount Lemmon Survey	·	2.4 km	MPC · JPL
420894	2013 LG_{22}	—	September 29, 2003	Kitt Peak	Spacewatch	·	800 m	MPC · JPL
420895	2013 LH_{22}	—	January 29, 2012	Kitt Peak	Spacewatch	·	2.0 km	MPC · JPL
420896	2013 LJ_{29}	—	July 12, 2005	Mount Lemmon	Mount Lemmon Survey	H	700 m	MPC · JPL
420897	2013 LO_{29}	—	September 17, 2006	Kitt Peak	Spacewatch	·	1.2 km	MPC · JPL
420898	2013 LK_{30}	—	April 19, 2009	Kitt Peak	Spacewatch	·	950 m	MPC · JPL
420899	2013 LQ_{30}	—	September 10, 2004	Socorro	LINEAR	·	920 m	MPC · JPL
420900	2013 LQ_{32}	—	November 23, 1997	Kitt Peak	Spacewatch	·	3.4 km	MPC · JPL

== 420901–421000 ==
back to top

Designation			Discovery			Properties		Ref
Permanent	Provisional	Named after	Date	Site	Discoverer(s)	Category	Diam.	Ref
420901	2013 LU_{33}	—	September 2, 2010	Mount Lemmon	Mount Lemmon Survey	·	1.0 km	MPC · JPL
420902	2013 LS_{34}	—	March 19, 2009	Catalina	CSS	·	1.4 km	MPC · JPL
420903	2013 LJ_{35}	—	October 2, 2000	Anderson Mesa	LONEOS	·	2.0 km	MPC · JPL
420904	2013 LM_{35}	—	April 11, 2007	Catalina	CSS	·	3.3 km	MPC · JPL
420905	2013 MK_{2}	—	October 15, 2007	Mount Lemmon	Mount Lemmon Survey	·	730 m	MPC · JPL
420906	2013 MW_{3}	—	December 15, 2001	Socorro	LINEAR	·	1.1 km	MPC · JPL
420907	2013 MY_{3}	—	June 1, 2008	Mount Lemmon	Mount Lemmon Survey	BRA	1.8 km	MPC · JPL
420908	2013 MC_{4}	—	September 11, 2004	Socorro	LINEAR	·	3.0 km	MPC · JPL
420909	2013 MK_{4}	—	October 15, 2007	Kitt Peak	Spacewatch	·	770 m	MPC · JPL
420910	2013 MW_{4}	—	July 4, 1995	Kitt Peak	Spacewatch	·	1.9 km	MPC · JPL
420911	2013 MY_{4}	—	June 19, 2013	Mount Lemmon	Mount Lemmon Survey	·	3.1 km	MPC · JPL
420912	2013 MH_{5}	—	March 1, 2012	Mount Lemmon	Mount Lemmon Survey	·	1.6 km	MPC · JPL
420913	2013 MM_{5}	—	June 19, 2013	Mount Lemmon	Mount Lemmon Survey	·	3.2 km	MPC · JPL
420914	2013 MA_{7}	—	March 26, 2010	WISE	WISE	·	3.7 km	MPC · JPL
420915	2013 ML_{7}	—	February 16, 2010	Siding Spring	SSS	H	610 m	MPC · JPL
420916	2013 NZ	—	September 30, 2003	Kitt Peak	Spacewatch	·	2.2 km	MPC · JPL
420917	2013 NB_{2}	—	October 10, 2008	Mount Lemmon	Mount Lemmon Survey	·	3.7 km	MPC · JPL
420918	2013 NF_{3}	—	September 25, 2005	Kitt Peak	Spacewatch	·	1.5 km	MPC · JPL
420919	2013 NQ_{3}	—	September 30, 1973	Palomar	C. J. van Houten, I. van Houten-Groeneveld, T. Gehrels	KOR	1.9 km	MPC · JPL
420920	2013 NR_{4}	—	January 12, 2011	Mount Lemmon	Mount Lemmon Survey	EOS	1.8 km	MPC · JPL
420921	2013 NR_{9}	—	September 21, 2003	Kitt Peak	Spacewatch	·	890 m	MPC · JPL
420922	2013 NA_{12}	—	September 22, 2008	Catalina	CSS	·	6.0 km	MPC · JPL
420923	2013 NC_{12}	—	September 7, 2004	Kitt Peak	Spacewatch	·	1.6 km	MPC · JPL
420924	2013 NS_{14}	—	August 17, 2006	Palomar	NEAT	NYS	850 m	MPC · JPL
420925	2013 NA_{17}	—	March 9, 2008	Mount Lemmon	Mount Lemmon Survey	·	830 m	MPC · JPL
420926	2013 NR_{17}	—	January 11, 1999	Kitt Peak	Spacewatch	VER	3.2 km	MPC · JPL
420927	2013 NA_{18}	—	January 27, 2007	Mount Lemmon	Mount Lemmon Survey	·	1.9 km	MPC · JPL
420928	2013 NC_{18}	—	January 14, 2011	Kitt Peak	Spacewatch	·	1.7 km	MPC · JPL
420929	2013 NJ_{18}	—	March 26, 2008	Mount Lemmon	Mount Lemmon Survey	·	900 m	MPC · JPL
420930	2013 NZ_{19}	—	August 3, 2002	Palomar	NEAT	·	3.8 km	MPC · JPL
420931	2013 NA_{22}	—	August 10, 2007	Kitt Peak	Spacewatch	·	3.5 km	MPC · JPL
420932	2013 NE_{23}	—	June 20, 2007	Kitt Peak	Spacewatch	·	3.4 km	MPC · JPL
420933	2013 OQ_{2}	—	January 10, 2011	Catalina	CSS	·	1.9 km	MPC · JPL
420934	2013 OO_{4}	—	October 30, 2005	Kitt Peak	Spacewatch	·	1.8 km	MPC · JPL
420935	2013 OB_{7}	—	August 25, 2000	Kitt Peak	Spacewatch	·	1.8 km	MPC · JPL
420936	2013 OV_{7}	—	July 16, 2002	Palomar	NEAT	·	3.6 km	MPC · JPL
420937	2013 OR_{8}	—	February 4, 2010	WISE	WISE	·	5.2 km	MPC · JPL
420938	2013 OT_{8}	—	October 17, 2003	Kitt Peak	Spacewatch	EMA	3.0 km	MPC · JPL
420939	2013 OC_{10}	—	April 14, 2005	Kitt Peak	Spacewatch	CLA	1.8 km	MPC · JPL
420940	2013 OO_{10}	—	March 10, 2010	WISE	WISE	·	4.2 km	MPC · JPL
420941	2013 OC_{11}	—	September 11, 2004	Socorro	LINEAR	·	3.4 km	MPC · JPL
420942	2013 OK_{11}	—	December 2, 2004	Kitt Peak	Spacewatch	·	5.3 km	MPC · JPL
420943	2013 PC	—	November 16, 2006	Kitt Peak	Spacewatch	·	1.3 km	MPC · JPL
420944	2013 PF_{1}	—	March 30, 2000	Kitt Peak	Spacewatch	EOS	2.1 km	MPC · JPL
420945	2013 PV_{1}	—	August 22, 2007	Anderson Mesa	LONEOS	·	4.0 km	MPC · JPL
420946	2013 PP_{3}	—	September 15, 2009	Kitt Peak	Spacewatch	·	1.9 km	MPC · JPL
420947	2013 PC_{4}	—	September 21, 2008	Mount Lemmon	Mount Lemmon Survey	·	4.2 km	MPC · JPL
420948	2013 PE_{4}	—	December 14, 2010	Mount Lemmon	Mount Lemmon Survey	EUN	1.3 km	MPC · JPL
420949	2013 PU_{4}	—	November 9, 2009	Mount Lemmon	Mount Lemmon Survey	·	1.4 km	MPC · JPL
420950	2013 PY_{4}	—	October 8, 2008	Mount Lemmon	Mount Lemmon Survey	VER	2.2 km	MPC · JPL
420951	2013 PZ_{4}	—	September 29, 2003	Kitt Peak	Spacewatch	EOS	1.5 km	MPC · JPL
420952	2013 PC_{6}	—	April 10, 2005	Kitt Peak	Spacewatch	V	760 m	MPC · JPL
420953	2013 PD_{6}	—	November 19, 2001	Socorro	LINEAR	·	850 m	MPC · JPL
420954	2013 PE_{8}	—	May 28, 2008	Mount Lemmon	Mount Lemmon Survey	·	2.9 km	MPC · JPL
420955	2013 PH_{8}	—	April 21, 2012	Catalina	CSS	·	1.5 km	MPC · JPL
420956	2013 PH_{9}	—	March 11, 2005	Kitt Peak	Spacewatch	·	900 m	MPC · JPL
420957	2013 PS_{9}	—	September 5, 2008	Kitt Peak	Spacewatch	·	2.6 km	MPC · JPL
420958	2013 PX_{9}	—	December 19, 2009	Mount Lemmon	Mount Lemmon Survey	·	2.9 km	MPC · JPL
420959	2013 PE_{10}	—	February 10, 2008	Mount Lemmon	Mount Lemmon Survey	·	1.6 km	MPC · JPL
420960	2013 PM_{10}	—	February 19, 2010	WISE	WISE	·	5.5 km	MPC · JPL
420961	2013 PW_{10}	—	March 3, 2008	Mount Lemmon	Mount Lemmon Survey	·	1.3 km	MPC · JPL
420962	2013 PQ_{11}	—	November 19, 2009	Kitt Peak	Spacewatch	·	3.1 km	MPC · JPL
420963	2013 PR_{12}	—	February 6, 2008	Catalina	CSS	PHO	1.3 km	MPC · JPL
420964	2013 PK_{14}	—	November 18, 2007	Mount Lemmon	Mount Lemmon Survey	V	750 m	MPC · JPL
420965	2013 PS_{14}	—	October 3, 2006	Kitt Peak	Spacewatch	3:2 · SHU	4.4 km	MPC · JPL
420966	2013 PY_{14}	—	March 14, 2007	Mount Lemmon	Mount Lemmon Survey	·	3.7 km	MPC · JPL
420967	2013 PC_{15}	—	November 8, 2007	Mount Lemmon	Mount Lemmon Survey	·	1.2 km	MPC · JPL
420968	2013 PL_{15}	—	November 18, 2009	Kitt Peak	Spacewatch	KOR	1.3 km	MPC · JPL
420969	2013 PV_{15}	—	September 18, 2003	Palomar	NEAT	·	1.8 km	MPC · JPL
420970	2013 PV_{16}	—	December 31, 2005	Kitt Peak	Spacewatch	GEF	1.5 km	MPC · JPL
420971	2013 PL_{17}	—	January 16, 2005	Kitt Peak	Spacewatch	·	2.8 km	MPC · JPL
420972	2013 PX_{18}	—	August 9, 2004	Anderson Mesa	LONEOS	·	2.4 km	MPC · JPL
420973	2013 PM_{24}	—	April 16, 2010	WISE	WISE	·	4.7 km	MPC · JPL
420974	2013 PN_{24}	—	June 21, 2007	Mount Lemmon	Mount Lemmon Survey	·	2.8 km	MPC · JPL
420975	2013 PP_{24}	—	February 12, 2008	Mount Lemmon	Mount Lemmon Survey	V	790 m	MPC · JPL
420976	2013 PT_{24}	—	January 16, 2011	Mount Lemmon	Mount Lemmon Survey	·	2.9 km	MPC · JPL
420977	2013 PQ_{27}	—	August 25, 2004	Kitt Peak	Spacewatch	·	1.8 km	MPC · JPL
420978	2013 PM_{29}	—	January 10, 2006	Kitt Peak	Spacewatch	·	1.8 km	MPC · JPL
420979	2013 PN_{29}	—	September 16, 2004	Kitt Peak	Spacewatch	·	1.9 km	MPC · JPL
420980	2013 PY_{30}	—	September 10, 2002	Palomar	NEAT	·	3.3 km	MPC · JPL
420981	2013 PE_{31}	—	September 25, 2003	Palomar	NEAT	·	4.0 km	MPC · JPL
420982	2013 PR_{31}	—	September 29, 2008	Mount Lemmon	Mount Lemmon Survey	·	3.8 km	MPC · JPL
420983	2013 PO_{32}	—	October 19, 2006	Mount Lemmon	Mount Lemmon Survey	3:2	5.2 km	MPC · JPL
420984	2013 PR_{33}	—	October 27, 2008	Kitt Peak	Spacewatch	·	3.2 km	MPC · JPL
420985	2013 PE_{34}	—	February 14, 2010	Mount Lemmon	Mount Lemmon Survey	·	2.8 km	MPC · JPL
420986	2013 PK_{34}	—	March 25, 2004	Siding Spring	SSS	·	2.7 km	MPC · JPL
420987	2013 PN_{34}	—	November 26, 2005	Kitt Peak	Spacewatch	·	1.5 km	MPC · JPL
420988	2013 PE_{35}	—	May 3, 2006	Kitt Peak	Spacewatch	·	2.9 km	MPC · JPL
420989	2013 PD_{36}	—	January 24, 2007	Catalina	CSS	·	2.2 km	MPC · JPL
420990	2013 PK_{36}	—	March 25, 2007	Mount Lemmon	Mount Lemmon Survey	·	2.2 km	MPC · JPL
420991	2013 PM_{36}	—	September 19, 2003	Kitt Peak	Spacewatch	·	2.3 km	MPC · JPL
420992	2013 PG_{37}	—	September 19, 2009	Kitt Peak	Spacewatch	·	1.8 km	MPC · JPL
420993	2013 PC_{38}	—	May 20, 2006	Kitt Peak	Spacewatch	·	4.1 km	MPC · JPL
420994	2013 PR_{39}	—	March 9, 2007	Kitt Peak	Spacewatch	·	2.8 km	MPC · JPL
420995	2013 PR_{42}	—	March 6, 2011	Kitt Peak	Spacewatch	·	3.3 km	MPC · JPL
420996	2013 PU_{42}	—	February 16, 2004	Kitt Peak	Spacewatch	·	3.5 km	MPC · JPL
420997	2013 PG_{43}	—	December 21, 2006	Kitt Peak	Spacewatch	EUN	1.3 km	MPC · JPL
420998	2013 PP_{44}	—	December 3, 2010	Kitt Peak	Spacewatch	·	2.1 km	MPC · JPL
420999	2013 PT_{44}	—	August 29, 2005	Kitt Peak	Spacewatch	MAR	920 m	MPC · JPL
421000	2013 PG_{45}	—	October 10, 2008	Mount Lemmon	Mount Lemmon Survey	·	2.7 km	MPC · JPL

back to top

== Meaning of names ==
As minor planet discoveries are confirmed, they are given a permanent number by the IAU's Minor Planet Center (MPC), and the discoverers can then submit names for them, following the IAU's naming conventions. The list below concerns those minor planets in the specified number-range that have received names, and explains the meanings of those names.

Official naming citations of newly named small Solar System bodies are approved and published in a bulletin by IAU's Working Group for Small Bodies Nomenclature (WGSBN). Before May 2021, citations were published in MPC's Minor Planet Circulars for many decades. Recent citations can also be found on the JPL Small-Body Database (SBDB). Until his death in 2016, German astronomer Lutz D. Schmadel compiled these citations into the Dictionary of Minor Planet Names (DMP) and regularly updated the collection.

Based on Paul Herget's The Names of the Minor Planets, Schmadel also researched the unclear origin of numerous asteroids, most of which had been named prior to World War II. This article incorporates text from this source, which is in the public domain: SBDB New namings may only be added to this list below after official publication as the preannouncement of names is condemned. The WGSBN publishes a comprehensive guideline for the naming rules of non-cometary small Solar System bodies.

Named minor planet	Provisional	This minor planet was named for...	Ref · Catalog
420356 Praamžius	2012 BX_{85}	Praamžius, the oldest and highest Lithuanian god related to the creation of the world	JPL · 420356
420612 Nuptel	2012 HK_{60}	NUPT, founded in 1942, is the abbreviation of Nanjing University of Posts and Telecommunications.	IAU · 420612
420779 Świdwin	2013 GR_{75}	Świdwin, a town located in West Pomerania Province in Poland	JPL · 420779
