= List of minor planets: 486001–487000 =

The following is a partial list of minor planets, running from minor-planet number 486001 through 487000, inclusive. The primary data for this and other partial lists is based on JPL's "Small-Body Orbital Elements" and data available from the Minor Planet Center. Critical list information is also provided by the MPC, unless otherwise specified from Lowell Observatory. A detailed description of the table's columns and additional sources are given on the main page including a complete list of every page in this series, and a statistical break-up on the dynamical classification of minor planets.

Also see the summary list of all named bodies in numerical and alphabetical order, and the corresponding naming citations for the number range of this particular list. New namings may only be added to this list after official publication, as the preannouncement of names is condemned by the Working Group for Small Bodies Nomenclature of the International Astronomical Union.

Near-Earth obj.	MBA (inner)	MBA (outer)	Centaur
Mars-crosser	MBA (middle)	Jupiter trojan	Trans-Neptunian obj.
Unclassified

== 486001–486100 ==
Designation			Discovery			Properties		Ref
Permanent	Provisional	Named after	Date	Site	Discoverer(s)	Category	Diam.	Ref
486001	2012 MR_{7}	—	June 23, 2012	Mount Lemmon	Mount Lemmon Survey	AMO	470 m	MPC; JPL
486002	2012 MS_{11}	—	September 10, 2007	Mount Lemmon	Mount Lemmon Survey	·	3.0 km	MPC; JPL
486003	2012 OG_{1}	—	June 20, 2012	Kitt Peak	Spacewatch	H	560 m	MPC; JPL
486004	2012 OP_{5}	—	November 12, 2009	La Sagra	OAM	·	750 m	MPC; JPL
486005	2012 PQ_{11}	—	September 21, 2009	Mount Lemmon	Mount Lemmon Survey	·	630 m	MPC; JPL
486006	2012 PD_{19}	—	August 13, 2012	Haleakala	Pan-STARRS 1	·	1.0 km	MPC; JPL
486007	2012 PH_{22}	—	September 18, 2004	Socorro	LINEAR	·	740 m	MPC; JPL
486008	2012 PK_{44}	—	September 14, 2013	Haleakala	Pan-STARRS 1	L5	7.3 km	MPC; JPL
486009	2012 QP_{25}	—	April 5, 2011	Kitt Peak	Spacewatch	·	1.1 km	MPC; JPL
486010	2012 QS_{30}	—	October 21, 2009	Mount Lemmon	Mount Lemmon Survey	·	650 m	MPC; JPL
486011	2012 QC_{37}	—	September 16, 2001	Socorro	LINEAR	ERI	1.4 km	MPC; JPL
486012	2012 RN_{11}	—	January 10, 2007	Kitt Peak	Spacewatch	·	720 m	MPC; JPL
486013	2012 RZ_{16}	—	June 2, 2011	Haleakala	Pan-STARRS 1	·	1.6 km	MPC; JPL
486014	2012 RP_{17}	—	February 24, 2006	Mount Lemmon	Mount Lemmon Survey	L5	7.8 km	MPC; JPL
486015	2012 RN_{40}	—	July 10, 2005	Siding Spring	SSS	·	670 m	MPC; JPL
486016	2012 RQ_{42}	—	August 26, 2012	Haleakala	Pan-STARRS 1	·	1.4 km	MPC; JPL
486017	2012 SK_{6}	—	August 2, 2011	Haleakala	Pan-STARRS 1	L5	10 km	MPC; JPL
486018	2012 SQ_{23}	—	August 24, 2011	Haleakala	Pan-STARRS 1	L5 · (291316)	8.6 km	MPC; JPL
486019	2012 SA_{25}	—	September 24, 2000	Kitt Peak	Spacewatch	L5	7.1 km	MPC; JPL
486020	2012 SQ_{44}	—	November 19, 2009	La Sagra	OAM	·	740 m	MPC; JPL
486021	2012 SQ_{49}	—	September 23, 2012	Mount Lemmon	Mount Lemmon Survey	L5	9.5 km	MPC; JPL
486022	2012 SR_{52}	—	September 8, 2000	Kitt Peak	Spacewatch	L5	9.6 km	MPC; JPL
486023	2012 SK_{61}	—	August 26, 2012	Haleakala	Pan-STARRS 1	NYS	930 m	MPC; JPL
486024	2012 TY_{10}	—	September 12, 2001	Socorro	LINEAR	MAS	640 m	MPC; JPL
486025	2012 TX_{14}	—	August 25, 2012	Kitt Peak	Spacewatch	L5	9.7 km	MPC; JPL
486026	2012 TM_{15}	—	August 30, 2011	Haleakala	Pan-STARRS 1	L5	8.1 km	MPC; JPL
486027	2012 TF_{25}	—	April 5, 2011	Mount Lemmon	Mount Lemmon Survey	·	600 m	MPC; JPL
486028	2012 TX_{28}	—	February 26, 2007	Mount Lemmon	Mount Lemmon Survey	L5	10 km	MPC; JPL
486029	2012 TO_{57}	—	September 3, 2008	La Sagra	OAM	·	1.3 km	MPC; JPL
486030	2012 TG_{66}	—	September 16, 2012	Mount Lemmon	Mount Lemmon Survey	·	760 m	MPC; JPL
486031	2012 TN_{66}	—	October 9, 2005	Kitt Peak	Spacewatch	·	560 m	MPC; JPL
486032	2012 TS_{67}	—	August 29, 2005	Kitt Peak	Spacewatch	·	560 m	MPC; JPL
486033	2012 TV_{79}	—	September 21, 2012	Kitt Peak	Spacewatch	L5	7.8 km	MPC; JPL
486034	2012 TK_{83}	—	October 26, 2005	Kitt Peak	Spacewatch	·	750 m	MPC; JPL
486035	2012 TL_{84}	—	October 15, 2001	Kitt Peak	Spacewatch	MAS	520 m	MPC; JPL
486036	2012 TS_{84}	—	March 20, 2010	Catalina	CSS	·	1.3 km	MPC; JPL
486037	2012 TK_{100}	—	October 1, 2008	Mount Lemmon	Mount Lemmon Survey	·	1.0 km	MPC; JPL
486038	2012 TG_{108}	—	October 1, 2005	Catalina	CSS	·	710 m	MPC; JPL
486039	2012 TQ_{124}	—	May 7, 2010	WISE	WISE	L5	5.9 km	MPC; JPL
486040	2012 TU_{125}	—	September 14, 2012	Catalina	CSS	·	900 m	MPC; JPL
486041	2012 TY_{127}	—	October 7, 2012	Haleakala	Pan-STARRS 1	L5	8.7 km	MPC; JPL
486042	2012 TW_{131}	—	October 8, 2012	Mount Lemmon	Mount Lemmon Survey	·	1.3 km	MPC; JPL
486043	2012 TA_{132}	—	October 29, 2005	Catalina	CSS	·	770 m	MPC; JPL
486044	2012 TB_{143}	—	August 24, 2011	Haleakala	Pan-STARRS 1	L5	6.8 km	MPC; JPL
486045	2012 TG_{147}	—	December 10, 2009	Mount Lemmon	Mount Lemmon Survey	·	560 m	MPC; JPL
486046	2012 TD_{154}	—	February 14, 2010	Mount Lemmon	Mount Lemmon Survey	MAS	530 m	MPC; JPL
486047	2012 TS_{159}	—	March 10, 2007	Mount Lemmon	Mount Lemmon Survey	·	770 m	MPC; JPL
486048	2012 TC_{161}	—	August 28, 2005	Kitt Peak	Spacewatch	·	570 m	MPC; JPL
486049	2012 TG_{162}	—	October 25, 2005	Kitt Peak	Spacewatch	·	600 m	MPC; JPL
486050	2012 TG_{176}	—	October 2, 1995	Kitt Peak	Spacewatch	·	500 m	MPC; JPL
486051	2012 TJ_{181}	—	November 18, 2009	Kitt Peak	Spacewatch	·	560 m	MPC; JPL
486052	2012 TS_{185}	—	September 15, 2012	Kitt Peak	Spacewatch	·	1.5 km	MPC; JPL
486053	2012 TD_{186}	—	October 25, 2005	Kitt Peak	Spacewatch	·	730 m	MPC; JPL
486054	2012 TP_{193}	—	March 13, 2010	Mount Lemmon	Mount Lemmon Survey	NYS	850 m	MPC; JPL
486055	2012 TT_{197}	—	September 17, 2012	La Sagra	OAM	·	2.0 km	MPC; JPL
486056	2012 TJ_{207}	—	September 1, 2005	Kitt Peak	Spacewatch	·	590 m	MPC; JPL
486057	2012 TE_{210}	—	August 29, 2011	Haleakala	Pan-STARRS 1	L5	7.6 km	MPC; JPL
486058	2012 TP_{221}	—	November 9, 2009	Mount Lemmon	Mount Lemmon Survey	·	500 m	MPC; JPL
486059	2012 TN_{236}	—	October 7, 2012	Haleakala	Pan-STARRS 1	V	570 m	MPC; JPL
486060	2012 TF_{237}	—	October 7, 2012	Haleakala	Pan-STARRS 1	L5	8.7 km	MPC; JPL
486061	2012 TW_{242}	—	October 6, 2005	Kitt Peak	Spacewatch	·	730 m	MPC; JPL
486062	2012 TK_{247}	—	September 7, 1999	Socorro	LINEAR	·	590 m	MPC; JPL
486063	2012 TF_{255}	—	October 13, 2012	Kitt Peak	Spacewatch	·	700 m	MPC; JPL
486064	2012 TK_{267}	—	October 8, 2012	Haleakala	Pan-STARRS 1	·	620 m	MPC; JPL
486065	2012 TM_{294}	—	September 20, 2001	Socorro	LINEAR	·	820 m	MPC; JPL
486066	2012 TW_{301}	—	October 25, 2005	Catalina	CSS	V	690 m	MPC; JPL
486067	2012 TH_{309}	—	September 16, 2012	Kitt Peak	Spacewatch	·	650 m	MPC; JPL
486068	2012 TT_{311}	—	October 29, 2005	Mount Lemmon	Mount Lemmon Survey	·	920 m	MPC; JPL
486069	2012 TZ_{311}	—	September 6, 2008	Catalina	CSS	·	1.1 km	MPC; JPL
486070	2012 TJ_{321}	—	October 7, 2005	Anderson Mesa	LONEOS	PHO	940 m	MPC; JPL
486071	2012 UY_{1}	—	November 20, 2009	Mount Lemmon	Mount Lemmon Survey	·	520 m	MPC; JPL
486072	2012 UA_{2}	—	October 22, 2005	Kitt Peak	Spacewatch	·	800 m	MPC; JPL
486073	2012 UM_{18}	—	October 10, 2012	Mount Lemmon	Mount Lemmon Survey	L5	7.8 km	MPC; JPL
486074	2012 UN_{18}	—	September 19, 2011	Mount Lemmon	Mount Lemmon Survey	L5	7.0 km	MPC; JPL
486075	2012 UC_{26}	—	October 17, 2012	Mount Lemmon	Mount Lemmon Survey	·	890 m	MPC; JPL
486076	2012 UC_{28}	—	December 4, 2005	Mount Lemmon	Mount Lemmon Survey	·	660 m	MPC; JPL
486077	2012 UX_{28}	—	April 2, 2011	Mount Lemmon	Mount Lemmon Survey	·	680 m	MPC; JPL
486078	2012 UZ_{30}	—	December 25, 2005	Kitt Peak	Spacewatch	·	740 m	MPC; JPL
486079	2012 UE_{33}	—	October 24, 2005	Kitt Peak	Spacewatch	·	700 m	MPC; JPL
486080	2012 UX_{40}	—	October 1, 2005	Mount Lemmon	Mount Lemmon Survey	·	1.9 km	MPC; JPL
486081	2012 UX_{41}	—	October 17, 2012	Haleakala	Pan-STARRS 1	·	570 m	MPC; JPL
486082	2012 UA_{42}	—	October 28, 2005	Kitt Peak	Spacewatch	·	640 m	MPC; JPL
486083	2012 UF_{42}	—	October 24, 2005	Kitt Peak	Spacewatch	·	670 m	MPC; JPL
486084	2012 UU_{50}	—	November 4, 2005	Mount Lemmon	Mount Lemmon Survey	·	730 m	MPC; JPL
486085	2012 UN_{62}	—	November 4, 2005	Mount Lemmon	Mount Lemmon Survey	·	890 m	MPC; JPL
486086	2012 UX_{75}	—	October 1, 2005	Kitt Peak	Spacewatch	·	600 m	MPC; JPL
486087	2012 UN_{87}	—	October 24, 2005	Kitt Peak	Spacewatch	·	660 m	MPC; JPL
486088	2012 UL_{88}	—	December 5, 2005	Mount Lemmon	Mount Lemmon Survey	MAS	590 m	MPC; JPL
486089	2012 UR_{93}	—	January 8, 2010	Mount Lemmon	Mount Lemmon Survey	(2076)	890 m	MPC; JPL
486090	2012 UA_{133}	—	October 23, 2005	Catalina	CSS	·	740 m	MPC; JPL
486091	2012 UC_{134}	—	September 30, 2008	La Sagra	OAM	·	2.2 km	MPC; JPL
486092	2012 UY_{134}	—	October 19, 2012	Mount Lemmon	Mount Lemmon Survey	·	720 m	MPC; JPL
486093	2012 UE_{152}	—	February 14, 2010	Mount Lemmon	Mount Lemmon Survey	·	940 m	MPC; JPL
486094	2012 UW_{155}	—	October 24, 2005	Kitt Peak	Spacewatch	·	600 m	MPC; JPL
486095	2012 UA_{160}	—	September 14, 2012	Catalina	CSS	·	1.2 km	MPC; JPL
486096	2012 UK_{164}	—	June 6, 2011	Haleakala	Pan-STARRS 1	·	2.2 km	MPC; JPL
486097	2012 UZ_{165}	—	October 31, 2005	Catalina	CSS	PHO	1.2 km	MPC; JPL
486098	2012 UL_{167}	—	August 31, 2005	Kitt Peak	Spacewatch	·	660 m	MPC; JPL
486099	2012 UM_{167}	—	July 26, 2001	Kitt Peak	Spacewatch	·	1.1 km	MPC; JPL
486100	2012 UB_{170}	—	October 10, 2012	Haleakala	Pan-STARRS 1	·	1.5 km	MPC; JPL

== 486101–486200 ==
back to top

Designation			Discovery			Properties		Ref
Permanent	Provisional	Named after	Date	Site	Discoverer(s)	Category	Diam.	Ref
486101	2012 VY_{21}	—	October 12, 2005	Kitt Peak	Spacewatch	·	540 m	MPC; JPL
486102	2012 VH_{29}	—	October 11, 2005	Kitt Peak	Spacewatch	·	450 m	MPC; JPL
486103	2012 VA_{30}	—	October 27, 2005	Mount Lemmon	Mount Lemmon Survey	NYS	640 m	MPC; JPL
486104	2012 VH_{30}	—	January 13, 2010	Mount Lemmon	Mount Lemmon Survey	·	650 m	MPC; JPL
486105	2012 VD_{40}	—	September 4, 2008	La Sagra	OAM	·	1.0 km	MPC; JPL
486106	2012 VF_{50}	—	October 8, 2012	Kitt Peak	Spacewatch	·	1.0 km	MPC; JPL
486107	2012 VU_{52}	—	October 21, 2012	Haleakala	Pan-STARRS 1	·	780 m	MPC; JPL
486108	2012 VH_{60}	—	November 7, 2012	Haleakala	Pan-STARRS 1	·	1.4 km	MPC; JPL
486109	2012 VK_{63}	—	November 12, 2012	Mount Lemmon	Mount Lemmon Survey	NYS	620 m	MPC; JPL
486110	2012 VT_{63}	—	October 30, 2005	Mount Lemmon	Mount Lemmon Survey	·	610 m	MPC; JPL
486111	2012 VQ_{68}	—	October 25, 2005	Kitt Peak	Spacewatch	·	690 m	MPC; JPL
486112	2012 VE_{70}	—	October 21, 2012	Haleakala	Pan-STARRS 1	·	1.1 km	MPC; JPL
486113	2012 VS_{75}	—	September 6, 2008	Catalina	CSS	·	1.1 km	MPC; JPL
486114	2012 VF_{76}	—	September 9, 1999	Socorro	LINEAR	·	1.9 km	MPC; JPL
486115	2012 VN_{78}	—	February 13, 2010	Mount Lemmon	Mount Lemmon Survey	(2076)	650 m	MPC; JPL
486116	2012 VP_{83}	—	September 4, 2008	Kitt Peak	Spacewatch	·	920 m	MPC; JPL
486117	2012 VW_{86}	—	November 21, 2009	Mount Lemmon	Mount Lemmon Survey	·	720 m	MPC; JPL
486118	2012 VN_{89}	—	September 29, 2008	Catalina	CSS	NYS	990 m	MPC; JPL
486119	2012 VV_{90}	—	December 5, 2005	Mount Lemmon	Mount Lemmon Survey	·	780 m	MPC; JPL
486120	2012 VU_{98}	—	November 21, 2005	Kitt Peak	Spacewatch	·	960 m	MPC; JPL
486121	2012 VA_{105}	—	October 25, 2005	Mount Lemmon	Mount Lemmon Survey	·	630 m	MPC; JPL
486122	2012 VA_{113}	—	December 20, 2008	La Sagra	OAM	·	1.1 km	MPC; JPL
486123	2012 WA	—	October 9, 2012	Haleakala	Pan-STARRS 1	·	1.5 km	MPC; JPL
486124	2012 WY_{4}	—	October 21, 2012	Haleakala	Pan-STARRS 1	·	920 m	MPC; JPL
486125	2012 WQ_{7}	—	March 18, 2010	Mount Lemmon	Mount Lemmon Survey	·	620 m	MPC; JPL
486126	2012 WC_{9}	—	September 2, 2012	Haleakala	Pan-STARRS 1	·	1.3 km	MPC; JPL
486127	2012 WT_{9}	—	October 7, 2008	Mount Lemmon	Mount Lemmon Survey	·	1.0 km	MPC; JPL
486128	2012 WT_{14}	—	November 5, 2012	Kitt Peak	Spacewatch	·	910 m	MPC; JPL
486129	2012 WX_{14}	—	January 2, 2006	Mount Lemmon	Mount Lemmon Survey	·	800 m	MPC; JPL
486130	2012 WS_{15}	—	November 19, 2012	Kitt Peak	Spacewatch	·	940 m	MPC; JPL
486131	2012 WS_{23}	—	September 19, 2008	Kitt Peak	Spacewatch	MAS	650 m	MPC; JPL
486132	2012 WV_{23}	—	November 30, 2005	Kitt Peak	Spacewatch	·	810 m	MPC; JPL
486133	2012 WE_{25}	—	December 7, 2005	Kitt Peak	Spacewatch	·	760 m	MPC; JPL
486134	2012 WK_{25}	—	October 16, 2012	Kitt Peak	Spacewatch	·	920 m	MPC; JPL
486135	2012 WR_{25}	—	October 23, 2005	Catalina	CSS	·	600 m	MPC; JPL
486136	2012 WY_{33}	—	December 18, 2001	Socorro	LINEAR	·	1.1 km	MPC; JPL
486137	2012 XC_{6}	—	August 3, 2008	La Sagra	OAM	·	740 m	MPC; JPL
486138	2012 XG_{7}	—	March 15, 2007	Mount Lemmon	Mount Lemmon Survey	·	590 m	MPC; JPL
486139	2012 XJ_{9}	—	September 6, 2008	Kitt Peak	Spacewatch	·	770 m	MPC; JPL
486140	2012 XZ_{12}	—	May 24, 2011	Haleakala	Pan-STARRS 1	·	1.7 km	MPC; JPL
486141	2012 XO_{13}	—	September 19, 2008	Kitt Peak	Spacewatch	·	1.0 km	MPC; JPL
486142	2012 XY_{13}	—	April 6, 2011	Mount Lemmon	Mount Lemmon Survey	·	680 m	MPC; JPL
486143	2012 XY_{23}	—	August 1, 2008	La Sagra	OAM	·	740 m	MPC; JPL
486144	2012 XQ_{30}	—	September 4, 2008	Kitt Peak	Spacewatch	·	870 m	MPC; JPL
486145	2012 XD_{36}	—	January 27, 2006	Mount Lemmon	Mount Lemmon Survey	MAS	610 m	MPC; JPL
486146	2012 XP_{36}	—	September 7, 2008	Mount Lemmon	Mount Lemmon Survey	·	880 m	MPC; JPL
486147	2012 XA_{43}	—	November 22, 2008	Kitt Peak	Spacewatch	·	1.1 km	MPC; JPL
486148	2012 XD_{48}	—	October 26, 2008	Mount Lemmon	Mount Lemmon Survey	·	850 m	MPC; JPL
486149	2012 XA_{51}	—	November 16, 1999	Kitt Peak	Spacewatch	ADE	1.2 km	MPC; JPL
486150	2012 XW_{51}	—	November 7, 2012	Mount Lemmon	Mount Lemmon Survey	·	1.1 km	MPC; JPL
486151	2012 XO_{62}	—	December 27, 2005	Kitt Peak	Spacewatch	·	720 m	MPC; JPL
486152	2012 XC_{91}	—	November 14, 2012	Kitt Peak	Spacewatch	·	620 m	MPC; JPL
486153	2012 XG_{95}	—	November 25, 2012	Haleakala	Pan-STARRS 1	·	1.7 km	MPC; JPL
486154	2012 XQ_{105}	—	September 20, 2011	Haleakala	Pan-STARRS 1	·	1.4 km	MPC; JPL
486155	2012 XW_{105}	—	December 7, 2012	Kitt Peak	Spacewatch	·	2.4 km	MPC; JPL
486156	2012 XF_{107}	—	September 4, 2008	Kitt Peak	Spacewatch	·	950 m	MPC; JPL
486157	2012 XL_{107}	—	February 5, 2006	Mount Lemmon	Mount Lemmon Survey	NYS	940 m	MPC; JPL
486158	2012 XJ_{110}	—	December 22, 2005	Catalina	CSS	·	850 m	MPC; JPL
486159	2012 XC_{120}	—	December 22, 2008	Kitt Peak	Spacewatch	·	1.0 km	MPC; JPL
486160	2012 XF_{120}	—	December 8, 2012	Kitt Peak	Spacewatch	·	1.3 km	MPC; JPL
486161	2012 XR_{123}	—	December 9, 2012	Haleakala	Pan-STARRS 1	·	1.7 km	MPC; JPL
486162	2012 XL_{132}	—	June 5, 2011	Mount Lemmon	Mount Lemmon Survey	·	1.8 km	MPC; JPL
486163	2012 XB_{135}	—	November 7, 2012	Haleakala	Pan-STARRS 1	·	840 m	MPC; JPL
486164	2012 XO_{137}	—	December 7, 2012	Haleakala	Pan-STARRS 1	·	1.4 km	MPC; JPL
486165	2012 XZ_{137}	—	December 18, 2001	Socorro	LINEAR	·	1.4 km	MPC; JPL
486166	2012 XG_{140}	—	September 28, 2008	Mount Lemmon	Mount Lemmon Survey	MAS	530 m	MPC; JPL
486167	2012 XM_{146}	—	November 5, 2005	Mount Lemmon	Mount Lemmon Survey	·	740 m	MPC; JPL
486168	2012 XB_{152}	—	November 4, 2008	Kitt Peak	Spacewatch	JUN	1.1 km	MPC; JPL
486169	2012 YC_{1}	—	December 12, 2012	Mount Lemmon	Mount Lemmon Survey	PHO	980 m	MPC; JPL
486170 Zolnowska	2012 YX_{2}	Zolnowska	December 10, 2012	Tincana	Zolnowski, M., Kusiak, M.	·	1.5 km	MPC; JPL
486171	2012 YB_{3}	—	June 20, 2006	Kitt Peak	Spacewatch	·	500 m	MPC; JPL
486172	2012 YB_{5}	—	December 13, 2012	Kitt Peak	Spacewatch	·	1.0 km	MPC; JPL
486173	2013 AY_{3}	—	December 3, 2008	Catalina	CSS	·	990 m	MPC; JPL
486174	2013 AO_{8}	—	November 30, 2008	Mount Lemmon	Mount Lemmon Survey	NYS	970 m	MPC; JPL
486175	2013 AU_{8}	—	February 10, 2010	WISE	WISE	PHO	860 m	MPC; JPL
486176	2013 AB_{9}	—	December 23, 2012	Haleakala	Pan-STARRS 1	·	1.7 km	MPC; JPL
486177	2013 AQ_{13}	—	October 18, 2011	Haleakala	Pan-STARRS 1	·	2.5 km	MPC; JPL
486178	2013 AT_{14}	—	November 12, 2012	Mount Lemmon	Mount Lemmon Survey	·	1.6 km	MPC; JPL
486179	2013 AH_{18}	—	October 4, 2008	Catalina	CSS	·	1.3 km	MPC; JPL
486180	2013 AX_{18}	—	January 3, 2013	Catalina	CSS	NYS	1.2 km	MPC; JPL
486181	2013 AW_{19}	—	December 19, 2008	La Sagra	OAM	·	1.4 km	MPC; JPL
486182	2013 AE_{21}	—	December 1, 2008	Catalina	CSS	·	1.2 km	MPC; JPL
486183	2013 AN_{21}	—	January 3, 2013	Haleakala	Pan-STARRS 1	·	1.8 km	MPC; JPL
486184	2013 AM_{23}	—	September 19, 2011	Haleakala	Pan-STARRS 1	·	1.4 km	MPC; JPL
486185	2013 AV_{23}	—	December 3, 2008	Mount Lemmon	Mount Lemmon Survey	·	1.4 km	MPC; JPL
486186	2013 AJ_{35}	—	April 30, 2006	Kitt Peak	Spacewatch	·	1.3 km	MPC; JPL
486187	2013 AW_{35}	—	April 9, 2010	Mount Lemmon	Mount Lemmon Survey	·	1.3 km	MPC; JPL
486188	2013 AC_{36}	—	April 29, 2006	Kitt Peak	Spacewatch	·	1.1 km	MPC; JPL
486189	2013 AQ_{36}	—	December 23, 2012	Haleakala	Pan-STARRS 1	NYS	1 km	MPC; JPL
486190	2013 AK_{37}	—	December 22, 2008	Kitt Peak	Spacewatch	·	1.1 km	MPC; JPL
486191	2013 AM_{40}	—	May 25, 2006	Kitt Peak	Spacewatch	·	1.6 km	MPC; JPL
486192	2013 AE_{41}	—	January 3, 2009	Mount Lemmon	Mount Lemmon Survey	·	780 m	MPC; JPL
486193	2013 AX_{42}	—	July 27, 2011	Haleakala	Pan-STARRS 1	·	1.3 km	MPC; JPL
486194	2013 AH_{43}	—	January 1, 2009	Kitt Peak	Spacewatch	·	1.1 km	MPC; JPL
486195	2013 AO_{44}	—	January 17, 2009	Kitt Peak	Spacewatch	·	1.3 km	MPC; JPL
486196	2013 AS_{44}	—	December 13, 2012	Mount Lemmon	Mount Lemmon Survey	·	1.8 km	MPC; JPL
486197	2013 AW_{47}	—	December 30, 2008	Catalina	CSS	·	1.6 km	MPC; JPL
486198	2013 AH_{52}	—	November 14, 2007	Mount Lemmon	Mount Lemmon Survey	·	1.9 km	MPC; JPL
486199	2013 AB_{55}	—	February 27, 2009	Catalina	CSS	·	1.5 km	MPC; JPL
486200	2013 AK_{55}	—	December 2, 2008	Kitt Peak	Spacewatch	·	1.1 km	MPC; JPL

== 486201–486300 ==
back to top

Designation			Discovery			Properties		Ref
Permanent	Provisional	Named after	Date	Site	Discoverer(s)	Category	Diam.	Ref
486201	2013 AC_{60}	—	August 27, 2011	Haleakala	Pan-STARRS 1	·	1.5 km	MPC; JPL
486202	2013 AQ_{68}	—	September 19, 2011	Haleakala	Pan-STARRS 1	·	1.7 km	MPC; JPL
486203	2013 AD_{69}	—	December 2, 2008	Kitt Peak	Spacewatch	·	1.5 km	MPC; JPL
486204	2013 AP_{74}	—	August 31, 2011	Haleakala	Pan-STARRS 1	V	890 m	MPC; JPL
486205	2013 AF_{77}	—	August 24, 2011	Haleakala	Pan-STARRS 1	PHO	1.0 km	MPC; JPL
486206	2013 AH_{77}	—	February 4, 2009	Mount Lemmon	Mount Lemmon Survey	·	1.0 km	MPC; JPL
486207	2013 AD_{78}	—	April 25, 2006	Kitt Peak	Spacewatch	·	1.2 km	MPC; JPL
486208	2013 AS_{80}	—	November 18, 2008	Kitt Peak	Spacewatch	·	960 m	MPC; JPL
486209	2013 AH_{83}	—	December 23, 2012	Haleakala	Pan-STARRS 1	·	1.1 km	MPC; JPL
486210	2013 AN_{88}	—	March 24, 2006	Kitt Peak	Spacewatch	·	1.1 km	MPC; JPL
486211	2013 AQ_{88}	—	December 3, 2008	Kitt Peak	Spacewatch	·	1.4 km	MPC; JPL
486212	2013 AJ_{89}	—	January 3, 2013	Haleakala	Pan-STARRS 1	·	2.0 km	MPC; JPL
486213	2013 AQ_{91}	—	December 23, 2012	Haleakala	Pan-STARRS 1	·	1.1 km	MPC; JPL
486214	2013 AN_{95}	—	November 30, 2008	Kitt Peak	Spacewatch	·	970 m	MPC; JPL
486215	2013 AA_{96}	—	December 25, 2005	Kitt Peak	Spacewatch	·	740 m	MPC; JPL
486216	2013 AS_{96}	—	December 23, 2012	Haleakala	Pan-STARRS 1	·	1.9 km	MPC; JPL
486217	2013 AD_{97}	—	September 24, 2011	Haleakala	Pan-STARRS 1	·	2.6 km	MPC; JPL
486218	2013 AQ_{97}	—	September 13, 2007	Catalina	CSS	·	1.7 km	MPC; JPL
486219	2013 AQ_{100}	—	November 19, 2008	Kitt Peak	Spacewatch	·	890 m	MPC; JPL
486220	2013 AB_{103}	—	January 5, 2013	Kitt Peak	Spacewatch	·	1.5 km	MPC; JPL
486221	2013 AS_{103}	—	January 26, 2006	Kitt Peak	Spacewatch	·	760 m	MPC; JPL
486222	2013 AE_{105}	—	February 24, 2009	Kitt Peak	Spacewatch	·	1.4 km	MPC; JPL
486223	2013 AY_{111}	—	January 15, 2009	Kitt Peak	Spacewatch	·	1.1 km	MPC; JPL
486224	2013 AV_{120}	—	December 19, 2004	Mount Lemmon	Mount Lemmon Survey	MAS	790 m	MPC; JPL
486225	2013 AQ_{121}	—	January 2, 2013	Mount Lemmon	Mount Lemmon Survey	PHO	930 m	MPC; JPL
486226	2013 AK_{128}	—	January 18, 2009	Kitt Peak	Spacewatch	·	930 m	MPC; JPL
486227	2013 AY_{129}	—	January 10, 2013	Haleakala	Pan-STARRS 1	·	1.4 km	MPC; JPL
486228	2013 AM_{130}	—	September 4, 2007	Mount Lemmon	Mount Lemmon Survey	·	1.2 km	MPC; JPL
486229	2013 AA_{139}	—	February 19, 2009	Mount Lemmon	Mount Lemmon Survey	·	1.3 km	MPC; JPL
486230	2013 AM_{165}	—	December 1, 2008	Kitt Peak	Spacewatch	·	950 m	MPC; JPL
486231	2013 AA_{174}	—	March 2, 2006	Kitt Peak	Spacewatch	·	940 m	MPC; JPL
486232	2013 BL_{4}	—	November 12, 2012	Mount Lemmon	Mount Lemmon Survey	MAR	950 m	MPC; JPL
486233	2013 BK_{5}	—	January 16, 2013	Catalina	CSS	·	1.7 km	MPC; JPL
486234	2013 BE_{6}	—	July 25, 2011	Haleakala	Pan-STARRS 1	·	940 m	MPC; JPL
486235	2013 BZ_{8}	—	December 23, 2012	Haleakala	Pan-STARRS 1	·	1.5 km	MPC; JPL
486236	2013 BG_{10}	—	July 26, 2011	Haleakala	Pan-STARRS 1	·	1.2 km	MPC; JPL
486237	2013 BL_{11}	—	December 29, 2008	Kitt Peak	Spacewatch	·	1.2 km	MPC; JPL
486238	2013 BG_{15}	—	January 17, 2013	Haleakala	Pan-STARRS 1	·	1.1 km	MPC; JPL
486239 Zosiakaczmarek	2013 BK_{16}	Zosiakaczmarek	December 13, 2012	Catalina	CSS	·	2.0 km	MPC; JPL
486240	2013 BL_{19}	—	February 1, 2005	Kitt Peak	Spacewatch	·	550 m	MPC; JPL
486241	2013 BW_{24}	—	November 17, 2000	Kitt Peak	Spacewatch	·	1.3 km	MPC; JPL
486242	2013 BE_{26}	—	January 18, 2013	Kitt Peak	Spacewatch	·	1.6 km	MPC; JPL
486243	2013 BL_{30}	—	September 22, 2003	Kitt Peak	Spacewatch	·	1.4 km	MPC; JPL
486244	2013 BX_{30}	—	July 28, 2011	Haleakala	Pan-STARRS 1	·	1.3 km	MPC; JPL
486245	2013 BH_{32}	—	January 16, 2013	Haleakala	Pan-STARRS 1	·	1.0 km	MPC; JPL
486246	2013 BJ_{32}	—	February 15, 2010	Kitt Peak	Spacewatch	·	1.0 km	MPC; JPL
486247	2013 BF_{33}	—	January 20, 2009	Kitt Peak	Spacewatch	·	1.3 km	MPC; JPL
486248	2013 BG_{33}	—	January 31, 2009	Kitt Peak	Spacewatch	·	950 m	MPC; JPL
486249	2013 BM_{36}	—	January 17, 2013	Haleakala	Pan-STARRS 1	NYS	920 m	MPC; JPL
486250	2013 BV_{36}	—	July 26, 2011	Haleakala	Pan-STARRS 1	·	1.1 km	MPC; JPL
486251	2013 BQ_{40}	—	January 16, 2009	Kitt Peak	Spacewatch	(5)	1.0 km	MPC; JPL
486252	2013 BN_{41}	—	February 7, 2002	Socorro	LINEAR	·	1.3 km	MPC; JPL
486253	2013 BK_{42}	—	January 10, 2013	Haleakala	Pan-STARRS 1	NYS	1.1 km	MPC; JPL
486254	2013 BO_{42}	—	October 19, 2011	Haleakala	Pan-STARRS 1	·	2.0 km	MPC; JPL
486255	2013 BB_{48}	—	January 16, 2013	Haleakala	Pan-STARRS 1	·	1.2 km	MPC; JPL
486256	2013 BA_{56}	—	February 7, 2002	Kitt Peak	Spacewatch	·	890 m	MPC; JPL
486257	2013 BT_{70}	—	January 18, 2013	Haleakala	Pan-STARRS 1	PHO	1.0 km	MPC; JPL
486258	2013 BW_{75}	—	February 2, 2009	Kitt Peak	Spacewatch	·	1.2 km	MPC; JPL
486259	2013 BQ_{77}	—	January 23, 1998	Kitt Peak	Spacewatch	·	1.3 km	MPC; JPL
486260	2013 BT_{79}	—	August 21, 2011	Haleakala	Pan-STARRS 1	·	1.3 km	MPC; JPL
486261	2013 CU_{2}	—	January 10, 2013	Haleakala	Pan-STARRS 1	·	1.2 km	MPC; JPL
486262	2013 CR_{7}	—	March 25, 2006	Kitt Peak	Spacewatch	NYS	960 m	MPC; JPL
486263	2013 CL_{9}	—	September 21, 2011	Catalina	CSS	·	1.7 km	MPC; JPL
486264	2013 CN_{10}	—	February 1, 2005	Kitt Peak	Spacewatch	·	940 m	MPC; JPL
486265	2013 CU_{10}	—	January 28, 2009	Catalina	CSS	·	2.0 km	MPC; JPL
486266	2013 CZ_{12}	—	September 10, 2007	Mount Lemmon	Mount Lemmon Survey	(5)	920 m	MPC; JPL
486267	2013 CE_{13}	—	February 9, 2005	Mount Lemmon	Mount Lemmon Survey	·	800 m	MPC; JPL
486268	2013 CR_{15}	—	December 23, 2012	Mount Lemmon	Mount Lemmon Survey	·	2.2 km	MPC; JPL
486269	2013 CN_{18}	—	October 30, 2007	Kitt Peak	Spacewatch	·	1.0 km	MPC; JPL
486270	2013 CF_{19}	—	October 9, 2007	Mount Lemmon	Mount Lemmon Survey	·	800 m	MPC; JPL
486271	2013 CK_{19}	—	December 23, 2012	Haleakala	Pan-STARRS 1	·	1.1 km	MPC; JPL
486272	2013 CH_{31}	—	December 8, 2012	Mount Lemmon	Mount Lemmon Survey	·	1.1 km	MPC; JPL
486273	2013 CG_{32}	—	February 5, 2013	Kitt Peak	Spacewatch	·	3.2 km	MPC; JPL
486274	2013 CL_{33}	—	February 1, 2013	Nogales	M. Schwartz, P. R. Holvorcem	·	1.4 km	MPC; JPL
486275	2013 CQ_{37}	—	December 4, 1999	Kitt Peak	Spacewatch	JUN	1.1 km	MPC; JPL
486276	2013 CQ_{38}	—	September 20, 2011	Haleakala	Pan-STARRS 1	·	2.0 km	MPC; JPL
486277	2013 CK_{39}	—	February 4, 2009	Mount Lemmon	Mount Lemmon Survey	·	1.4 km	MPC; JPL
486278	2013 CN_{41}	—	July 1, 2011	Mount Lemmon	Mount Lemmon Survey	·	1.2 km	MPC; JPL
486279	2013 CP_{45}	—	October 16, 2003	Kitt Peak	Spacewatch	·	760 m	MPC; JPL
486280	2013 CV_{47}	—	February 5, 2013	Kitt Peak	Spacewatch	·	1.4 km	MPC; JPL
486281	2013 CY_{47}	—	August 20, 2011	Haleakala	Pan-STARRS 1	·	1.5 km	MPC; JPL
486282	2013 CM_{48}	—	November 4, 2007	Mount Lemmon	Mount Lemmon Survey	·	1.2 km	MPC; JPL
486283	2013 CX_{51}	—	February 1, 2009	Kitt Peak	Spacewatch	·	880 m	MPC; JPL
486284	2013 CC_{53}	—	October 5, 2007	Kitt Peak	Spacewatch	V	750 m	MPC; JPL
486285	2013 CT_{53}	—	September 23, 2011	Haleakala	Pan-STARRS 1	V	820 m	MPC; JPL
486286	2013 CQ_{54}	—	November 3, 1999	Kitt Peak	Spacewatch	(5)	870 m	MPC; JPL
486287	2013 CY_{54}	—	October 24, 2011	Haleakala	Pan-STARRS 1	·	1.9 km	MPC; JPL
486288	2013 CD_{56}	—	January 8, 2013	Mount Lemmon	Mount Lemmon Survey	MAR	910 m	MPC; JPL
486289	2013 CU_{60}	—	December 31, 2008	Mount Lemmon	Mount Lemmon Survey	·	920 m	MPC; JPL
486290	2013 CF_{61}	—	September 25, 2011	Haleakala	Pan-STARRS 1	·	1.6 km	MPC; JPL
486291	2013 CJ_{66}	—	September 4, 2011	Haleakala	Pan-STARRS 1	·	1.6 km	MPC; JPL
486292	2013 CF_{68}	—	January 2, 2009	Mount Lemmon	Mount Lemmon Survey	·	1.1 km	MPC; JPL
486293	2013 CO_{70}	—	October 11, 2007	Kitt Peak	Spacewatch	·	1.2 km	MPC; JPL
486294	2013 CX_{71}	—	January 10, 2013	Kitt Peak	Spacewatch	·	1.1 km	MPC; JPL
486295	2013 CV_{73}	—	January 31, 2009	Kitt Peak	Spacewatch	·	1.0 km	MPC; JPL
486296	2013 CL_{74}	—	February 5, 2013	Catalina	CSS	·	1.2 km	MPC; JPL
486297	2013 CD_{75}	—	March 3, 2009	Kitt Peak	Spacewatch	·	990 m	MPC; JPL
486298	2013 CC_{76}	—	December 4, 2008	Kitt Peak	Spacewatch	·	1.1 km	MPC; JPL
486299	2013 CH_{76}	—	January 17, 2013	Mount Lemmon	Mount Lemmon Survey	·	1.3 km	MPC; JPL
486300	2013 CG_{77}	—	March 29, 2009	Catalina	CSS	·	1.7 km	MPC; JPL

== 486301–486400 ==
back to top

Designation			Discovery			Properties		Ref
Permanent	Provisional	Named after	Date	Site	Discoverer(s)	Category	Diam.	Ref
486301	2013 CF_{78}	—	February 8, 2013	Haleakala	Pan-STARRS 1	·	1.3 km	MPC; JPL
486302	2013 CQ_{80}	—	February 8, 2013	Haleakala	Pan-STARRS 1	·	1.6 km	MPC; JPL
486303	2013 CP_{81}	—	August 2, 2010	La Sagra	OAM	·	1.5 km	MPC; JPL
486304	2013 CG_{84}	—	May 1, 2010	WISE	WISE	·	2.2 km	MPC; JPL
486305	2013 CL_{84}	—	April 22, 2009	Mount Lemmon	Mount Lemmon Survey	·	1.5 km	MPC; JPL
486306	2013 CW_{89}	—	January 18, 2009	Kitt Peak	Spacewatch	PHO	1.0 km	MPC; JPL
486307	2013 CL_{92}	—	February 8, 2013	Haleakala	Pan-STARRS 1	·	1.1 km	MPC; JPL
486308	2013 CL_{94}	—	January 17, 2013	Kitt Peak	Spacewatch	·	1.6 km	MPC; JPL
486309	2013 CE_{97}	—	January 17, 2013	Mount Lemmon	Mount Lemmon Survey	·	1.6 km	MPC; JPL
486310	2013 CM_{98}	—	February 8, 2013	Haleakala	Pan-STARRS 1	EUN	1 km	MPC; JPL
486311	2013 CE_{101}	—	October 25, 2011	Haleakala	Pan-STARRS 1	·	1.6 km	MPC; JPL
486312	2013 CF_{103}	—	February 9, 2013	Haleakala	Pan-STARRS 1	EOS	1.9 km	MPC; JPL
486313	2013 CZ_{109}	—	November 24, 2011	Haleakala	Pan-STARRS 1	·	1.6 km	MPC; JPL
486314	2013 CF_{110}	—	January 20, 2013	Kitt Peak	Spacewatch	(5)	1.3 km	MPC; JPL
486315	2013 CV_{110}	—	November 2, 2007	Mount Lemmon	Mount Lemmon Survey	·	1.1 km	MPC; JPL
486316	2013 CD_{111}	—	August 28, 2011	Haleakala	Pan-STARRS 1	·	1.3 km	MPC; JPL
486317	2013 CZ_{111}	—	September 21, 2003	Kitt Peak	Spacewatch	RAF	720 m	MPC; JPL
486318	2013 CU_{113}	—	August 24, 2011	La Sagra	OAM	·	1.4 km	MPC; JPL
486319	2013 CU_{114}	—	April 2, 2006	Kitt Peak	Spacewatch	PHO	970 m	MPC; JPL
486320	2013 CO_{115}	—	October 9, 2004	Kitt Peak	Spacewatch	MAS	640 m	MPC; JPL
486321	2013 CQ_{118}	—	February 19, 2009	Mount Lemmon	Mount Lemmon Survey	BRG	1.1 km	MPC; JPL
486322	2013 CV_{122}	—	December 31, 2008	Catalina	CSS	·	1.2 km	MPC; JPL
486323	2013 CR_{125}	—	October 31, 2007	Mount Lemmon	Mount Lemmon Survey	KON	1.9 km	MPC; JPL
486324	2013 CN_{127}	—	June 27, 2005	Kitt Peak	Spacewatch	·	1.8 km	MPC; JPL
486325	2013 CO_{127}	—	October 26, 2011	Haleakala	Pan-STARRS 1	·	1.8 km	MPC; JPL
486326	2013 CB_{135}	—	February 6, 2013	Kitt Peak	Spacewatch	·	1.1 km	MPC; JPL
486327	2013 CL_{143}	—	October 11, 2007	Mount Lemmon	Mount Lemmon Survey	(5)	910 m	MPC; JPL
486328	2013 CV_{143}	—	December 30, 2008	Mount Lemmon	Mount Lemmon Survey	·	1.6 km	MPC; JPL
486329	2013 CR_{146}	—	September 8, 2011	Haleakala	Pan-STARRS 1	·	1.6 km	MPC; JPL
486330	2013 CS_{147}	—	February 26, 2009	Kitt Peak	Spacewatch	·	1.4 km	MPC; JPL
486331	2013 CC_{149}	—	March 1, 2009	Kitt Peak	Spacewatch	·	930 m	MPC; JPL
486332	2013 CP_{149}	—	March 1, 2009	Mount Lemmon	Mount Lemmon Survey	·	1.3 km	MPC; JPL
486333	2013 CZ_{151}	—	January 17, 2009	Kitt Peak	Spacewatch	·	1.4 km	MPC; JPL
486334	2013 CV_{152}	—	February 26, 2009	Kitt Peak	Spacewatch	·	1.7 km	MPC; JPL
486335	2013 CP_{156}	—	February 14, 2013	Haleakala	Pan-STARRS 1	·	1.1 km	MPC; JPL
486336	2013 CO_{159}	—	November 13, 2007	Mount Lemmon	Mount Lemmon Survey	·	1.3 km	MPC; JPL
486337	2013 CL_{160}	—	February 26, 2009	Kitt Peak	Spacewatch	·	840 m	MPC; JPL
486338	2013 CE_{161}	—	February 27, 2009	Kitt Peak	Spacewatch	·	870 m	MPC; JPL
486339	2013 CF_{161}	—	September 15, 2006	Kitt Peak	Spacewatch	·	1.4 km	MPC; JPL
486340	2013 CW_{162}	—	February 14, 2013	Kitt Peak	Spacewatch	·	1.3 km	MPC; JPL
486341	2013 CV_{164}	—	February 14, 2013	Haleakala	Pan-STARRS 1	·	1.2 km	MPC; JPL
486342	2013 CH_{170}	—	January 9, 2013	Mount Lemmon	Mount Lemmon Survey	·	1.3 km	MPC; JPL
486343	2013 CP_{170}	—	October 26, 2011	Haleakala	Pan-STARRS 1	·	1.7 km	MPC; JPL
486344	2013 CE_{172}	—	January 20, 2009	Mount Lemmon	Mount Lemmon Survey	·	1.4 km	MPC; JPL
486345	2013 CG_{175}	—	January 19, 2013	Mount Lemmon	Mount Lemmon Survey	·	1.2 km	MPC; JPL
486346	2013 CL_{175}	—	February 15, 2013	Haleakala	Pan-STARRS 1	(5)	960 m	MPC; JPL
486347	2013 CY_{175}	—	February 15, 2013	Haleakala	Pan-STARRS 1	·	1.1 km	MPC; JPL
486348	2013 CQ_{176}	—	March 4, 2005	Kitt Peak	Spacewatch	·	760 m	MPC; JPL
486349	2013 CJ_{179}	—	December 8, 2012	Mount Lemmon	Mount Lemmon Survey	·	1.0 km	MPC; JPL
486350	2013 CT_{180}	—	August 31, 2011	Haleakala	Pan-STARRS 1	KON	2.6 km	MPC; JPL
486351	2013 CB_{181}	—	October 24, 2011	Haleakala	Pan-STARRS 1	·	1.3 km	MPC; JPL
486352	2013 CJ_{181}	—	February 13, 2013	Haleakala	Pan-STARRS 1	·	1.1 km	MPC; JPL
486353	2013 CB_{183}	—	September 4, 2011	Haleakala	Pan-STARRS 1	BRG	1.4 km	MPC; JPL
486354	2013 CJ_{190}	—	September 27, 2011	Mount Lemmon	Mount Lemmon Survey	·	1.3 km	MPC; JPL
486355	2013 CF_{193}	—	September 7, 2011	Kitt Peak	Spacewatch	·	1.3 km	MPC; JPL
486356	2013 CD_{195}	—	January 30, 2009	Mount Lemmon	Mount Lemmon Survey	·	940 m	MPC; JPL
486357	2013 CN_{195}	—	February 4, 2009	Mount Lemmon	Mount Lemmon Survey	MAR	880 m	MPC; JPL
486358	2013 CQ_{196}	—	February 5, 2013	Kitt Peak	Spacewatch	·	1.6 km	MPC; JPL
486359	2013 CB_{201}	—	March 3, 2005	Kitt Peak	Spacewatch	·	900 m	MPC; JPL
486360	2013 CJ_{211}	—	January 4, 2013	Kitt Peak	Spacewatch	·	1.5 km	MPC; JPL
486361	2013 CT_{211}	—	May 1, 2006	Kitt Peak	Spacewatch	MAS	700 m	MPC; JPL
486362	2013 CA_{214}	—	February 8, 2013	Haleakala	Pan-STARRS 1	·	680 m	MPC; JPL
486363	2013 CR_{214}	—	February 8, 2013	Haleakala	Pan-STARRS 1	·	980 m	MPC; JPL
486364	2013 CX_{214}	—	January 10, 2013	Mount Lemmon	Mount Lemmon Survey	MAR	840 m	MPC; JPL
486365	2013 DZ_{1}	—	February 9, 2013	Haleakala	Pan-STARRS 1	·	1.4 km	MPC; JPL
486366	2013 DP_{2}	—	February 28, 2009	Kitt Peak	Spacewatch	(5)	800 m	MPC; JPL
486367	2013 DL_{3}	—	March 3, 2009	Kitt Peak	Spacewatch	·	1.4 km	MPC; JPL
486368	2013 DJ_{4}	—	January 17, 2013	Mount Lemmon	Mount Lemmon Survey	WIT	890 m	MPC; JPL
486369	2013 DX_{5}	—	October 25, 2011	Haleakala	Pan-STARRS 1	·	1.7 km	MPC; JPL
486370	2013 DF_{7}	—	February 7, 2013	Kitt Peak	Spacewatch	·	1.3 km	MPC; JPL
486371	2013 DB_{11}	—	March 11, 2005	Mount Lemmon	Mount Lemmon Survey	·	680 m	MPC; JPL
486372	2013 DQ_{15}	—	September 26, 2006	Kitt Peak	Spacewatch	·	1.6 km	MPC; JPL
486373	2013 EJ_{4}	—	February 20, 2009	Kitt Peak	Spacewatch	·	1.1 km	MPC; JPL
486374	2013 EL_{7}	—	February 15, 2013	Haleakala	Pan-STARRS 1	WIT	810 m	MPC; JPL
486375	2013 EE_{9}	—	April 9, 2005	Mount Lemmon	Mount Lemmon Survey	·	990 m	MPC; JPL
486376	2013 EZ_{10}	—	November 18, 2011	Mount Lemmon	Mount Lemmon Survey	·	1.4 km	MPC; JPL
486377	2013 EH_{11}	—	September 20, 2011	Haleakala	Pan-STARRS 1	·	2.1 km	MPC; JPL
486378	2013 EZ_{15}	—	February 4, 2009	Mount Lemmon	Mount Lemmon Survey	·	740 m	MPC; JPL
486379	2013 ED_{16}	—	March 31, 2009	Mount Lemmon	Mount Lemmon Survey	·	1.1 km	MPC; JPL
486380	2013 EF_{18}	—	March 18, 2004	Kitt Peak	Spacewatch	·	2.0 km	MPC; JPL
486381	2013 EA_{20}	—	March 5, 2013	Catalina	CSS	·	1.6 km	MPC; JPL
486382	2013 EH_{21}	—	January 22, 2013	Kitt Peak	Spacewatch	·	1.5 km	MPC; JPL
486383	2013 EY_{21}	—	February 18, 2013	Kitt Peak	Spacewatch	·	1.4 km	MPC; JPL
486384	2013 EP_{22}	—	September 15, 2007	Mount Lemmon	Mount Lemmon Survey	·	950 m	MPC; JPL
486385	2013 EA_{27}	—	December 12, 2006	Kitt Peak	Spacewatch	KOR	1.4 km	MPC; JPL
486386	2013 EN_{29}	—	March 26, 2009	Kitt Peak	Spacewatch	·	1.0 km	MPC; JPL
486387	2013 ES_{29}	—	May 8, 2005	Mount Lemmon	Mount Lemmon Survey	·	2.5 km	MPC; JPL
486388	2013 EK_{31}	—	May 20, 2005	Mount Lemmon	Mount Lemmon Survey	·	910 m	MPC; JPL
486389	2013 EA_{32}	—	January 19, 2002	Kitt Peak	Spacewatch	·	3.1 km	MPC; JPL
486390	2013 EL_{32}	—	March 25, 2009	Mount Lemmon	Mount Lemmon Survey	·	1.4 km	MPC; JPL
486391	2013 EL_{34}	—	October 10, 2007	Mount Lemmon	Mount Lemmon Survey	·	1.1 km	MPC; JPL
486392	2013 EP_{35}	—	January 13, 2008	Kitt Peak	Spacewatch	·	2.1 km	MPC; JPL
486393	2013 EC_{36}	—	April 19, 2009	Kitt Peak	Spacewatch	·	1.1 km	MPC; JPL
486394	2013 EO_{39}	—	April 10, 2005	Mount Lemmon	Mount Lemmon Survey	·	950 m	MPC; JPL
486395	2013 EV_{41}	—	March 6, 2013	Haleakala	Pan-STARRS 1	·	990 m	MPC; JPL
486396	2013 EO_{42}	—	March 6, 2013	Haleakala	Pan-STARRS 1	KON	1.6 km	MPC; JPL
486397	2013 EH_{46}	—	November 8, 2007	Kitt Peak	Spacewatch	·	1.2 km	MPC; JPL
486398	2013 EC_{49}	—	September 21, 2011	Kitt Peak	Spacewatch	·	1.1 km	MPC; JPL
486399	2013 EW_{56}	—	February 14, 2013	Kitt Peak	Spacewatch	·	1.5 km	MPC; JPL
486400	2013 EP_{67}	—	October 26, 2011	Haleakala	Pan-STARRS 1	·	1.2 km	MPC; JPL

== 486401–486500 ==
back to top

Designation			Discovery			Properties		Ref
Permanent	Provisional	Named after	Date	Site	Discoverer(s)	Category	Diam.	Ref
486401	2013 EX_{70}	—	September 20, 2011	Kitt Peak	Spacewatch	·	1.3 km	MPC; JPL
486402	2013 ED_{71}	—	February 15, 2013	Haleakala	Pan-STARRS 1	·	1.4 km	MPC; JPL
486403	2013 EN_{74}	—	December 16, 2007	Kitt Peak	Spacewatch	·	1.3 km	MPC; JPL
486404	2013 EU_{80}	—	October 23, 2011	Haleakala	Pan-STARRS 1	·	1.6 km	MPC; JPL
486405	2013 EY_{83}	—	March 8, 2013	Haleakala	Pan-STARRS 1	·	1.8 km	MPC; JPL
486406	2013 EZ_{83}	—	March 8, 2013	Haleakala	Pan-STARRS 1	·	1.3 km	MPC; JPL
486407	2013 EU_{89}	—	January 19, 2013	Kitt Peak	Spacewatch	·	2.1 km	MPC; JPL
486408	2013 ES_{91}	—	February 14, 2013	Haleakala	Pan-STARRS 1	·	1.9 km	MPC; JPL
486409	2013 EP_{92}	—	October 12, 2007	Kitt Peak	Spacewatch	·	1.7 km	MPC; JPL
486410	2013 EY_{94}	—	March 8, 2013	Haleakala	Pan-STARRS 1	·	2.9 km	MPC; JPL
486411	2013 EQ_{103}	—	April 6, 2005	Mount Lemmon	Mount Lemmon Survey	·	1.0 km	MPC; JPL
486412	2013 EE_{105}	—	August 23, 2011	Haleakala	Pan-STARRS 1	·	1.2 km	MPC; JPL
486413	2013 ES_{106}	—	March 13, 2013	Kitt Peak	Spacewatch	·	1.5 km	MPC; JPL
486414	2013 EL_{108}	—	February 7, 2013	Kitt Peak	Spacewatch	·	1.2 km	MPC; JPL
486415	2013 EW_{110}	—	October 27, 2011	Mount Lemmon	Mount Lemmon Survey	·	1.7 km	MPC; JPL
486416 Mami	2013 EZ_{110}	Mami	March 13, 2013	Palomar	Palomar Transient Factory	·	1.6 km	MPC; JPL
486417	2013 ER_{111}	—	October 28, 2006	Kitt Peak	Spacewatch	·	1.9 km	MPC; JPL
486418	2013 EG_{113}	—	June 17, 2010	WISE	WISE	·	3.1 km	MPC; JPL
486419	2013 EK_{114}	—	April 27, 2009	Kitt Peak	Spacewatch	·	1.3 km	MPC; JPL
486420	2013 EY_{114}	—	March 24, 2009	Mount Lemmon	Mount Lemmon Survey	·	950 m	MPC; JPL
486421	2013 EV_{116}	—	March 8, 2013	Haleakala	Pan-STARRS 1	·	1.5 km	MPC; JPL
486422	2013 EX_{117}	—	April 18, 2009	Mount Lemmon	Mount Lemmon Survey	·	1.3 km	MPC; JPL
486423	2013 EM_{120}	—	March 13, 2013	Palomar	Palomar Transient Factory	·	2.0 km	MPC; JPL
486424	2013 EG_{127}	—	January 30, 2009	Mount Lemmon	Mount Lemmon Survey	·	950 m	MPC; JPL
486425	2013 FU	—	February 7, 2013	Kitt Peak	Spacewatch	·	1.0 km	MPC; JPL
486426	2013 FJ_{1}	—	February 28, 2008	Mount Lemmon	Mount Lemmon Survey	·	2.1 km	MPC; JPL
486427	2013 FY_{1}	—	July 6, 2010	Kitt Peak	Spacewatch	·	1.6 km	MPC; JPL
486428	2013 FU_{4}	—	September 21, 2001	Kitt Peak	Spacewatch	·	1.7 km	MPC; JPL
486429	2013 FR_{6}	—	October 23, 2011	Mount Lemmon	Mount Lemmon Survey	·	840 m	MPC; JPL
486430	2013 FX_{6}	—	February 17, 2013	Kitt Peak	Spacewatch	·	1.7 km	MPC; JPL
486431	2013 FN_{7}	—	June 19, 2009	Kitt Peak	Spacewatch	·	2.2 km	MPC; JPL
486432	2013 FO_{8}	—	May 26, 2009	Kitt Peak	Spacewatch	·	1.2 km	MPC; JPL
486433	2013 FO_{9}	—	October 12, 2010	Mount Lemmon	Mount Lemmon Survey	·	1.5 km	MPC; JPL
486434	2013 FT_{10}	—	October 26, 2011	Haleakala	Pan-STARRS 1	·	2.3 km	MPC; JPL
486435	2013 FS_{16}	—	May 14, 2009	Mount Lemmon	Mount Lemmon Survey	·	1.3 km	MPC; JPL
486436	2013 FB_{17}	—	March 19, 2013	Haleakala	Pan-STARRS 1	AEO	1.1 km	MPC; JPL
486437	2013 FW_{18}	—	April 17, 2009	Kitt Peak	Spacewatch	EUN	1.1 km	MPC; JPL
486438	2013 FC_{19}	—	March 15, 2013	Catalina	CSS	·	1.2 km	MPC; JPL
486439	2013 FC_{20}	—	May 25, 2009	Mount Lemmon	Mount Lemmon Survey	·	1.4 km	MPC; JPL
486440	2013 FL_{21}	—	March 19, 2013	Haleakala	Pan-STARRS 1	·	2.1 km	MPC; JPL
486441	2013 FY_{22}	—	March 13, 2013	Kitt Peak	Spacewatch	·	1.2 km	MPC; JPL
486442	2013 FX_{23}	—	October 31, 2010	Mount Lemmon	Mount Lemmon Survey	·	1.8 km	MPC; JPL
486443	2013 FA_{24}	—	October 25, 2011	Haleakala	Pan-STARRS 1	·	1.3 km	MPC; JPL
486444	2013 FC_{24}	—	March 12, 2013	Mount Lemmon	Mount Lemmon Survey	MIS	2.3 km	MPC; JPL
486445	2013 FJ_{24}	—	May 4, 2005	Kitt Peak	Spacewatch	BRG	1.1 km	MPC; JPL
486446	2013 FO_{24}	—	October 23, 2011	Haleakala	Pan-STARRS 1	·	1.5 km	MPC; JPL
486447	2013 GF_{2}	—	January 18, 2008	Mount Lemmon	Mount Lemmon Survey	DOR	2.4 km	MPC; JPL
486448	2013 GN_{6}	—	March 5, 2013	Haleakala	Pan-STARRS 1	EUN	1.3 km	MPC; JPL
486449	2013 GL_{7}	—	March 4, 2013	Haleakala	Pan-STARRS 1	·	1.7 km	MPC; JPL
486450	2013 GR_{9}	—	April 16, 2004	Kitt Peak	Spacewatch	·	1.5 km	MPC; JPL
486451	2013 GA_{10}	—	March 19, 2013	Haleakala	Pan-STARRS 1	(1298)	2.9 km	MPC; JPL
486452	2013 GP_{10}	—	February 26, 2009	Kitt Peak	Spacewatch	PHO	970 m	MPC; JPL
486453	2013 GY_{14}	—	August 31, 2005	Kitt Peak	Spacewatch	·	2.0 km	MPC; JPL
486454	2013 GX_{16}	—	April 24, 2000	Kitt Peak	Spacewatch	·	1.3 km	MPC; JPL
486455	2013 GW_{17}	—	October 11, 2010	Mount Lemmon	Mount Lemmon Survey	·	1.3 km	MPC; JPL
486456	2013 GO_{20}	—	March 19, 2013	Haleakala	Pan-STARRS 1	·	1.6 km	MPC; JPL
486457	2013 GN_{26}	—	April 4, 2013	Haleakala	Pan-STARRS 1	·	1.8 km	MPC; JPL
486458	2013 GY_{26}	—	March 7, 2013	Kitt Peak	Spacewatch	(16286)	2.0 km	MPC; JPL
486459	2013 GD_{28}	—	April 18, 2009	Kitt Peak	Spacewatch	·	1.4 km	MPC; JPL
486460	2013 GQ_{31}	—	March 15, 2004	Kitt Peak	Spacewatch	·	1.3 km	MPC; JPL
486461	2013 GX_{35}	—	November 24, 2011	Mount Lemmon	Mount Lemmon Survey	EUN	1.1 km	MPC; JPL
486462	2013 GE_{36}	—	February 18, 2013	Mount Lemmon	Mount Lemmon Survey	·	1.2 km	MPC; JPL
486463	2013 GL_{36}	—	April 7, 2013	Mount Lemmon	Mount Lemmon Survey	·	1.1 km	MPC; JPL
486464	2013 GF_{38}	—	October 26, 2011	Haleakala	Pan-STARRS 1	·	1.4 km	MPC; JPL
486465	2013 GH_{43}	—	October 1, 2010	Mount Lemmon	Mount Lemmon Survey	·	1.2 km	MPC; JPL
486466	2013 GR_{43}	—	March 18, 2013	Kitt Peak	Spacewatch	·	1.7 km	MPC; JPL
486467	2013 GB_{46}	—	November 25, 2011	Haleakala	Pan-STARRS 1	·	1.8 km	MPC; JPL
486468	2013 GH_{49}	—	October 1, 2010	Mount Lemmon	Mount Lemmon Survey	EUN	1 km	MPC; JPL
486469	2013 GR_{51}	—	June 17, 1996	Kitt Peak	Spacewatch	·	1.1 km	MPC; JPL
486470	2013 GE_{52}	—	April 10, 2013	Mount Lemmon	Mount Lemmon Survey	·	1.8 km	MPC; JPL
486471	2013 GK_{56}	—	October 28, 2011	Mount Lemmon	Mount Lemmon Survey	·	1.4 km	MPC; JPL
486472	2013 GG_{59}	—	March 19, 2013	Haleakala	Pan-STARRS 1	·	1.8 km	MPC; JPL
486473	2013 GB_{61}	—	April 18, 2009	Mount Lemmon	Mount Lemmon Survey	·	980 m	MPC; JPL
486474	2013 GV_{61}	—	March 21, 2009	Kitt Peak	Spacewatch	·	930 m	MPC; JPL
486475	2013 GV_{66}	—	October 26, 2011	Haleakala	Pan-STARRS 1	EUN	1.3 km	MPC; JPL
486476	2013 GJ_{70}	—	March 11, 2013	Catalina	CSS	JUN	1.0 km	MPC; JPL
486477	2013 GC_{71}	—	March 5, 2013	Kitt Peak	Spacewatch	·	1.5 km	MPC; JPL
486478	2013 GE_{72}	—	April 25, 2004	Catalina	CSS	·	1.5 km	MPC; JPL
486479	2013 GT_{72}	—	November 25, 2011	Haleakala	Pan-STARRS 1	·	1.4 km	MPC; JPL
486480	2013 GK_{74}	—	March 31, 2009	Mount Lemmon	Mount Lemmon Survey	(5)	890 m	MPC; JPL
486481	2013 GS_{74}	—	April 14, 2004	Kitt Peak	Spacewatch	JUN	1.0 km	MPC; JPL
486482	2013 GF_{77}	—	September 15, 2010	Mount Lemmon	Mount Lemmon Survey	·	1.7 km	MPC; JPL
486483	2013 GE_{81}	—	March 6, 2008	Mount Lemmon	Mount Lemmon Survey	(13314)	1.9 km	MPC; JPL
486484	2013 GU_{81}	—	November 24, 2011	Haleakala	Pan-STARRS 1	JUN	1.2 km	MPC; JPL
486485	2013 GD_{82}	—	December 18, 2007	Mount Lemmon	Mount Lemmon Survey	·	2.1 km	MPC; JPL
486486	2013 GU_{82}	—	April 13, 2013	Mount Lemmon	Mount Lemmon Survey	·	2.7 km	MPC; JPL
486487	2013 GP_{83}	—	January 17, 2013	Haleakala	Pan-STARRS 1	·	1.7 km	MPC; JPL
486488	2013 GF_{85}	—	February 5, 2013	Mount Lemmon	Mount Lemmon Survey	EUN	1.3 km	MPC; JPL
486489	2013 GC_{92}	—	November 25, 2011	Haleakala	Pan-STARRS 1	EUN	1.8 km	MPC; JPL
486490	2013 GH_{93}	—	March 13, 2013	Haleakala	Pan-STARRS 1	·	1.6 km	MPC; JPL
486491	2013 GU_{93}	—	March 7, 2013	Kitt Peak	Spacewatch	·	1.3 km	MPC; JPL
486492	2013 GY_{93}	—	December 22, 2012	Haleakala	Pan-STARRS 1	EUN	1.3 km	MPC; JPL
486493	2013 GN_{95}	—	February 13, 2013	ESA OGS	ESA OGS	EUN	1.2 km	MPC; JPL
486494	2013 GS_{96}	—	April 30, 2009	Mount Lemmon	Mount Lemmon Survey	·	1 km	MPC; JPL
486495	2013 GW_{96}	—	April 2, 2013	Haleakala	Pan-STARRS 1	·	2.3 km	MPC; JPL
486496	2013 GA_{97}	—	March 18, 2013	Kitt Peak	Spacewatch	EUN	1.0 km	MPC; JPL
486497	2013 GH_{98}	—	March 18, 2013	Kitt Peak	Spacewatch	·	1.9 km	MPC; JPL
486498	2013 GX_{98}	—	March 18, 2013	Kitt Peak	Spacewatch	·	1.6 km	MPC; JPL
486499	2013 GB_{99}	—	July 31, 2009	Siding Spring	SSS	·	2.4 km	MPC; JPL
486500	2013 GH_{100}	—	March 16, 2013	Mount Lemmon	Mount Lemmon Survey	·	2.2 km	MPC; JPL

== 486501–486600 ==
back to top

Designation			Discovery			Properties		Ref
Permanent	Provisional	Named after	Date	Site	Discoverer(s)	Category	Diam.	Ref
486501	2013 GZ_{100}	—	April 13, 2013	Haleakala	Pan-STARRS 1	·	1.4 km	MPC; JPL
486502	2013 GC_{101}	—	November 3, 2010	Kitt Peak	Spacewatch	·	2.1 km	MPC; JPL
486503	2013 GP_{103}	—	April 20, 2009	Mount Lemmon	Mount Lemmon Survey	·	1.1 km	MPC; JPL
486504	2013 GN_{104}	—	December 5, 2007	Kitt Peak	Spacewatch	·	1.0 km	MPC; JPL
486505	2013 GL_{106}	—	January 31, 2009	Mount Lemmon	Mount Lemmon Survey	·	1.5 km	MPC; JPL
486506	2013 GB_{109}	—	September 10, 2010	Kitt Peak	Spacewatch	·	1.3 km	MPC; JPL
486507	2013 GW_{110}	—	January 17, 2013	Haleakala	Pan-STARRS 1	DOR	2.6 km	MPC; JPL
486508	2013 GA_{111}	—	April 11, 2013	Mount Lemmon	Mount Lemmon Survey	MAR	1.1 km	MPC; JPL
486509	2013 GW_{113}	—	April 9, 2013	Haleakala	Pan-STARRS 1	DOR	2.6 km	MPC; JPL
486510	2013 GO_{114}	—	July 12, 2010	WISE	WISE	·	3.7 km	MPC; JPL
486511	2013 GW_{114}	—	April 2, 2005	Kitt Peak	Spacewatch	RAF	910 m	MPC; JPL
486512	2013 GX_{115}	—	November 20, 2006	Kitt Peak	Spacewatch	AST	1.5 km	MPC; JPL
486513	2013 GW_{118}	—	February 26, 2008	Mount Lemmon	Mount Lemmon Survey	·	1.4 km	MPC; JPL
486514	2013 GD_{122}	—	November 28, 1994	Kitt Peak	Spacewatch	·	1.1 km	MPC; JPL
486515	2013 GZ_{122}	—	April 10, 2013	Haleakala	Pan-STARRS 1	EOS	2.1 km	MPC; JPL
486516	2013 GW_{123}	—	March 5, 2013	Haleakala	Pan-STARRS 1	·	2.4 km	MPC; JPL
486517	2013 GT_{124}	—	April 10, 2013	Haleakala	Pan-STARRS 1	·	1.1 km	MPC; JPL
486518	2013 GN_{126}	—	April 13, 2004	Kitt Peak	Spacewatch	·	1.6 km	MPC; JPL
486519	2013 GA_{127}	—	April 13, 2013	Haleakala	Pan-STARRS 1	NAE	2.2 km	MPC; JPL
486520	2013 GH_{130}	—	October 26, 2011	Haleakala	Pan-STARRS 1	·	1.5 km	MPC; JPL
486521	2013 GN_{130}	—	October 13, 2006	Kitt Peak	Spacewatch	·	1.7 km	MPC; JPL
486522	2013 HN_{2}	—	April 4, 2013	Haleakala	Pan-STARRS 1	·	2.2 km	MPC; JPL
486523	2013 HE_{4}	—	April 4, 2013	Haleakala	Pan-STARRS 1	·	1.4 km	MPC; JPL
486524	2013 HX_{4}	—	April 20, 2009	Catalina	CSS	EUN	980 m	MPC; JPL
486525	2013 HU_{5}	—	December 29, 2011	Mount Lemmon	Mount Lemmon Survey	EUN	1.1 km	MPC; JPL
486526	2013 HK_{6}	—	February 11, 2008	Kitt Peak	Spacewatch	(18466)	2.5 km	MPC; JPL
486527	2013 HO_{7}	—	August 2, 2005	Siding Spring	SSS	·	1.9 km	MPC; JPL
486528	2013 HC_{8}	—	October 13, 2006	Kitt Peak	Spacewatch	EUN	1.2 km	MPC; JPL
486529	2013 HU_{8}	—	February 7, 2008	Kitt Peak	Spacewatch	·	1.7 km	MPC; JPL
486530	2013 HB_{10}	—	February 28, 2009	Mount Lemmon	Mount Lemmon Survey	·	3.2 km	MPC; JPL
486531	2013 HT_{11}	—	April 2, 2009	Kitt Peak	Spacewatch	·	1.5 km	MPC; JPL
486532	2013 HH_{13}	—	January 13, 2008	Kitt Peak	Spacewatch	·	1.3 km	MPC; JPL
486533	2013 HO_{13}	—	December 22, 2012	Haleakala	Pan-STARRS 1	MAR	1.1 km	MPC; JPL
486534	2013 HG_{14}	—	December 22, 2012	Haleakala	Pan-STARRS 1	EUN	1.3 km	MPC; JPL
486535	2013 HM_{16}	—	December 6, 2011	Haleakala	Pan-STARRS 1	·	1.4 km	MPC; JPL
486536	2013 HZ_{17}	—	October 23, 2011	Mount Lemmon	Mount Lemmon Survey	·	1.2 km	MPC; JPL
486537	2013 HA_{19}	—	March 16, 2013	Mount Lemmon	Mount Lemmon Survey	·	1.6 km	MPC; JPL
486538	2013 HB_{20}	—	January 25, 2012	Haleakala	Pan-STARRS 1	·	2.6 km	MPC; JPL
486539	2013 HW_{21}	—	March 16, 2013	Kitt Peak	Spacewatch	·	2.1 km	MPC; JPL
486540	2013 HX_{21}	—	November 15, 2006	Mount Lemmon	Mount Lemmon Survey	615	1.5 km	MPC; JPL
486541	2013 HS_{24}	—	January 21, 2013	Haleakala	Pan-STARRS 1	·	2.1 km	MPC; JPL
486542	2013 HT_{24}	—	April 12, 2013	Haleakala	Pan-STARRS 1	ADE	1.6 km	MPC; JPL
486543	2013 HY_{29}	—	February 13, 2004	Kitt Peak	Spacewatch	·	1.4 km	MPC; JPL
486544	2013 HB_{30}	—	January 20, 2008	Kitt Peak	Spacewatch	·	1.6 km	MPC; JPL
486545	2013 HT_{32}	—	March 5, 2013	Haleakala	Pan-STARRS 1	·	880 m	MPC; JPL
486546	2013 HK_{35}	—	October 31, 2002	Kitt Peak	Spacewatch	EUN	940 m	MPC; JPL
486547	2013 HS_{38}	—	September 20, 2001	Socorro	LINEAR	·	1.4 km	MPC; JPL
486548	2013 HH_{41}	—	March 6, 2008	Mount Lemmon	Mount Lemmon Survey	·	1.8 km	MPC; JPL
486549	2013 HK_{45}	—	December 28, 2011	Kitt Peak	Spacewatch	·	1.8 km	MPC; JPL
486550	2013 HA_{46}	—	November 11, 2010	Mount Lemmon	Mount Lemmon Survey	·	2.7 km	MPC; JPL
486551	2013 HO_{48}	—	November 1, 2006	Kitt Peak	Spacewatch	·	1.7 km	MPC; JPL
486552	2013 HR_{48}	—	October 21, 2011	Mount Lemmon	Mount Lemmon Survey	·	1.7 km	MPC; JPL
486553	2013 HW_{52}	—	October 4, 2004	Kitt Peak	Spacewatch	·	2.2 km	MPC; JPL
486554	2013 HV_{58}	—	March 29, 2004	Kitt Peak	Spacewatch	·	1.3 km	MPC; JPL
486555	2013 HJ_{59}	—	November 24, 2011	Haleakala	Pan-STARRS 1	·	1.5 km	MPC; JPL
486556	2013 HP_{60}	—	October 21, 2011	Catalina	CSS	·	1.3 km	MPC; JPL
486557	2013 HP_{67}	—	September 18, 2009	Mount Lemmon	Mount Lemmon Survey	·	2.8 km	MPC; JPL
486558	2013 HU_{72}	—	October 17, 2010	Mount Lemmon	Mount Lemmon Survey	·	1.7 km	MPC; JPL
486559	2013 HE_{73}	—	April 9, 2013	Haleakala	Pan-STARRS 1	HOF	2.1 km	MPC; JPL
486560	2013 HO_{74}	—	January 26, 2012	Haleakala	Pan-STARRS 1	HOF	1.9 km	MPC; JPL
486561	2013 HR_{78}	—	November 1, 2005	Mount Lemmon	Mount Lemmon Survey	EOS	1.3 km	MPC; JPL
486562	2013 HT_{80}	—	September 30, 2005	Mount Lemmon	Mount Lemmon Survey	·	1.4 km	MPC; JPL
486563	2013 HW_{103}	—	April 9, 2013	Haleakala	Pan-STARRS 1	·	1.5 km	MPC; JPL
486564	2013 HY_{115}	—	September 29, 2005	Mount Lemmon	Mount Lemmon Survey	·	1.6 km	MPC; JPL
486565	2013 HE_{121}	—	September 30, 2010	Mount Lemmon	Mount Lemmon Survey	·	1.7 km	MPC; JPL
486566	2013 HT_{124}	—	October 19, 2011	Kitt Peak	Spacewatch	·	1.3 km	MPC; JPL
486567	2013 HP_{129}	—	January 29, 2012	Haleakala	Pan-STARRS 1	·	2.1 km	MPC; JPL
486568	2013 HA_{130}	—	September 14, 2010	Kitt Peak	Spacewatch	·	1.4 km	MPC; JPL
486569	2013 HZ_{130}	—	February 6, 2008	Kitt Peak	Spacewatch	·	1.4 km	MPC; JPL
486570	2013 HN_{131}	—	April 9, 2013	Haleakala	Pan-STARRS 1	MRX	790 m	MPC; JPL
486571	2013 HM_{135}	—	April 10, 2013	Haleakala	Pan-STARRS 1	ADE	1.5 km	MPC; JPL
486572	2013 HY_{135}	—	March 28, 2008	Kitt Peak	Spacewatch	·	1.4 km	MPC; JPL
486573	2013 HX_{136}	—	April 7, 2013	Mount Lemmon	Mount Lemmon Survey	·	2.0 km	MPC; JPL
486574	2013 HG_{141}	—	September 14, 2006	Kitt Peak	Spacewatch	·	1.3 km	MPC; JPL
486575	2013 HW_{145}	—	April 2, 2013	Mount Lemmon	Mount Lemmon Survey	·	1.5 km	MPC; JPL
486576	2013 JJ	—	April 20, 2013	Mount Lemmon	Mount Lemmon Survey	·	3.7 km	MPC; JPL
486577	2013 JR	—	April 22, 2013	Mount Lemmon	Mount Lemmon Survey	·	3.0 km	MPC; JPL
486578	2013 JW_{1}	—	March 5, 2013	Haleakala	Pan-STARRS 1	·	1.1 km	MPC; JPL
486579	2013 JN_{2}	—	March 11, 2008	Mount Lemmon	Mount Lemmon Survey	DOR	2.0 km	MPC; JPL
486580	2013 JU_{5}	—	February 20, 2012	Haleakala	Pan-STARRS 1	NAE	2.8 km	MPC; JPL
486581	2013 JV_{6}	—	May 3, 2000	Socorro	LINEAR	·	1.8 km	MPC; JPL
486582	2013 JO_{8}	—	October 11, 2010	Mount Lemmon	Mount Lemmon Survey	·	1.7 km	MPC; JPL
486583	2013 JG_{16}	—	January 20, 2012	Mount Lemmon	Mount Lemmon Survey	·	1.7 km	MPC; JPL
486584	2013 JA_{23}	—	January 22, 2012	Haleakala	Pan-STARRS 1	EOS	2.1 km	MPC; JPL
486585	2013 JW_{25}	—	March 16, 2004	Kitt Peak	Spacewatch	EUN	880 m	MPC; JPL
486586	2013 JE_{28}	—	May 12, 2013	Haleakala	Pan-STARRS 1	·	1.6 km	MPC; JPL
486587	2013 JK_{28}	—	August 4, 2008	La Sagra	OAM	T_{j} (2.99)	6.2 km	MPC; JPL
486588	2013 JB_{32}	—	May 12, 2013	Mount Lemmon	Mount Lemmon Survey	·	2.3 km	MPC; JPL
486589	2013 JC_{35}	—	May 11, 2013	Mount Lemmon	Mount Lemmon Survey	·	1.5 km	MPC; JPL
486590	2013 JD_{35}	—	October 28, 1994	Kitt Peak	Spacewatch	·	3.3 km	MPC; JPL
486591	2013 JG_{35}	—	December 18, 2007	Mount Lemmon	Mount Lemmon Survey	·	1.8 km	MPC; JPL
486592	2013 JX_{39}	—	February 20, 2012	Haleakala	Pan-STARRS 1	·	3.5 km	MPC; JPL
486593	2013 JB_{40}	—	February 28, 2008	Kitt Peak	Spacewatch	DOR	1.8 km	MPC; JPL
486594	2013 JB_{44}	—	January 17, 2013	Haleakala	Pan-STARRS 1	·	1.7 km	MPC; JPL
486595	2013 JY_{46}	—	January 26, 2012	Haleakala	Pan-STARRS 1	·	1.8 km	MPC; JPL
486596	2013 JR_{47}	—	December 28, 2005	Kitt Peak	Spacewatch	·	2.9 km	MPC; JPL
486597	2013 JZ_{47}	—	March 14, 2012	Haleakala	Pan-STARRS 1	·	3.8 km	MPC; JPL
486598	2013 JT_{50}	—	February 25, 2008	Mount Lemmon	Mount Lemmon Survey	·	1.4 km	MPC; JPL
486599	2013 JZ_{52}	—	October 13, 2004	Kitt Peak	Spacewatch	EOS	2.1 km	MPC; JPL
486600	2013 JC_{54}	—	April 17, 2013	Haleakala	Pan-STARRS 1	·	1.8 km	MPC; JPL

== 486601–486700 ==
back to top

Designation			Discovery			Properties		Ref
Permanent	Provisional	Named after	Date	Site	Discoverer(s)	Category	Diam.	Ref
486601	2013 JD_{55}	—	April 15, 2013	Haleakala	Pan-STARRS 1	EOS	2.0 km	MPC; JPL
486602	2013 JS_{57}	—	April 11, 2013	Kitt Peak	Spacewatch	·	2.3 km	MPC; JPL
486603	2013 JC_{62}	—	April 15, 2013	Haleakala	Pan-STARRS 1	·	2.9 km	MPC; JPL
486604	2013 JR_{62}	—	May 11, 2008	Kitt Peak	Spacewatch	EOS	1.7 km	MPC; JPL
486605	2013 KD	—	October 2, 2006	Mount Lemmon	Mount Lemmon Survey	·	1.6 km	MPC; JPL
486606	2013 KF	—	October 27, 2006	Mount Lemmon	Mount Lemmon Survey	KON	2.2 km	MPC; JPL
486607	2013 KY_{1}	—	March 10, 2000	Catalina	CSS	AMO +1km	970 m	MPC; JPL
486608	2013 KN_{3}	—	November 6, 2010	Mount Lemmon	Mount Lemmon Survey	EUN	1.3 km	MPC; JPL
486609	2013 KO_{7}	—	April 15, 2013	Haleakala	Pan-STARRS 1	·	3.8 km	MPC; JPL
486610	2013 KD_{10}	—	February 14, 2013	Haleakala	Pan-STARRS 1	·	4.3 km	MPC; JPL
486611	2013 KE_{14}	—	April 13, 2013	Mount Lemmon	Mount Lemmon Survey	·	3.3 km	MPC; JPL
486612	2013 KR_{14}	—	May 5, 2013	Haleakala	Pan-STARRS 1	·	3.2 km	MPC; JPL
486613	2013 KG_{16}	—	April 7, 2013	Mount Lemmon	Mount Lemmon Survey	EOS	1.9 km	MPC; JPL
486614	2013 KN_{16}	—	December 3, 2010	Kitt Peak	Spacewatch	·	3.8 km	MPC; JPL
486615	2013 KG_{17}	—	January 17, 2013	Haleakala	Pan-STARRS 1	·	1.5 km	MPC; JPL
486616	2013 KO_{17}	—	January 2, 2012	Mount Lemmon	Mount Lemmon Survey	·	1.7 km	MPC; JPL
486617	2013 LJ_{5}	—	December 1, 2010	Mount Lemmon	Mount Lemmon Survey	·	2.1 km	MPC; JPL
486618	2013 LQ_{5}	—	February 4, 2012	Haleakala	Pan-STARRS 1	·	2.7 km	MPC; JPL
486619	2013 LZ_{5}	—	April 15, 2013	Haleakala	Pan-STARRS 1	·	3.0 km	MPC; JPL
486620	2013 LD_{8}	—	May 16, 2013	Haleakala	Pan-STARRS 1	·	2.4 km	MPC; JPL
486621	2013 LZ_{8}	—	April 26, 1995	Kitt Peak	Spacewatch	·	1.2 km	MPC; JPL
486622	2013 LD_{12}	—	February 14, 2013	Haleakala	Pan-STARRS 1	·	4.1 km	MPC; JPL
486623	2013 LJ_{18}	—	September 5, 2010	Mount Lemmon	Mount Lemmon Survey	·	2.4 km	MPC; JPL
486624	2013 LY_{19}	—	January 21, 2012	Haleakala	Pan-STARRS 1	·	3.1 km	MPC; JPL
486625	2013 LX_{20}	—	January 22, 2012	Haleakala	Pan-STARRS 1	·	3.0 km	MPC; JPL
486626	2013 LU_{21}	—	July 10, 2005	Siding Spring	SSS	·	1.3 km	MPC; JPL
486627	2013 LU_{23}	—	May 8, 2013	Haleakala	Pan-STARRS 1	·	2.8 km	MPC; JPL
486628	2013 LE_{24}	—	May 29, 2008	Kitt Peak	Spacewatch	·	1.6 km	MPC; JPL
486629	2013 LM_{24}	—	May 15, 2013	Haleakala	Pan-STARRS 1	EOS	1.7 km	MPC; JPL
486630	2013 LC_{33}	—	January 27, 2012	Mount Lemmon	Mount Lemmon Survey	·	1.7 km	MPC; JPL
486631	2013 LD_{34}	—	February 2, 2008	Mount Lemmon	Mount Lemmon Survey	·	1.3 km	MPC; JPL
486632	2013 MH_{2}	—	February 4, 2012	Haleakala	Pan-STARRS 1	EOS	1.6 km	MPC; JPL
486633	2013 NN	—	November 24, 2011	Haleakala	Pan-STARRS 1	H	430 m	MPC; JPL
486634	2013 NA_{7}	—	January 27, 2011	Mount Lemmon	Mount Lemmon Survey	·	3.3 km	MPC; JPL
486635	2013 NM_{20}	—	February 5, 2011	Haleakala	Pan-STARRS 1	·	3.3 km	MPC; JPL
486636	2013 NW_{22}	—	February 8, 2011	Mount Lemmon	Mount Lemmon Survey	·	3.2 km	MPC; JPL
486637	2013 OC_{3}	—	July 17, 2013	Haleakala	Pan-STARRS 1	H	420 m	MPC; JPL
486638	2013 OC_{4}	—	November 3, 2011	Catalina	CSS	H	740 m	MPC; JPL
486639	2013 OW_{4}	—	February 11, 2011	Mount Lemmon	Mount Lemmon Survey	·	3.4 km	MPC; JPL
486640	2013 PA	—	February 5, 2011	Haleakala	Pan-STARRS 1	THB	3.2 km	MPC; JPL
486641	2013 PS	—	January 2, 2011	Mount Lemmon	Mount Lemmon Survey	·	2.5 km	MPC; JPL
486642	2013 PK_{1}	—	August 2, 2013	Haleakala	Pan-STARRS 1	·	3.2 km	MPC; JPL
486643	2013 PO_{1}	—	April 5, 2003	Kitt Peak	Spacewatch	·	2.0 km	MPC; JPL
486644	2013 PZ_{1}	—	January 27, 2006	Anderson Mesa	LONEOS	·	3.4 km	MPC; JPL
486645	2013 PK_{16}	—	August 1, 2013	Haleakala	Pan-STARRS 1	H	610 m	MPC; JPL
486646	2013 PG_{20}	—	May 16, 2012	Haleakala	Pan-STARRS 1	·	2.8 km	MPC; JPL
486647	2013 PF_{25}	—	September 10, 2007	Mount Lemmon	Mount Lemmon Survey	·	3.5 km	MPC; JPL
486648	2013 PL_{53}	—	October 9, 2008	Mount Lemmon	Mount Lemmon Survey	·	2.7 km	MPC; JPL
486649	2013 PN_{63}	—	February 25, 2006	Kitt Peak	Spacewatch	HYG	2.1 km	MPC; JPL
486650	2013 PK_{72}	—	September 23, 2008	Mount Lemmon	Mount Lemmon Survey	·	4.6 km	MPC; JPL
486651	2013 QZ	—	October 6, 2008	Mount Lemmon	Mount Lemmon Survey	·	2.4 km	MPC; JPL
486652	2013 QM_{1}	—	July 29, 2008	Mount Lemmon	Mount Lemmon Survey	H	520 m	MPC; JPL
486653	2013 QT_{1}	—	August 1, 2013	Haleakala	Pan-STARRS 1	H	440 m	MPC; JPL
486654	2013 QW_{8}	—	September 13, 2007	Kitt Peak	Spacewatch	CYB	4.0 km	MPC; JPL
486655	2013 QG_{12}	—	February 28, 2006	Mount Lemmon	Mount Lemmon Survey	·	2.9 km	MPC; JPL
486656	2013 QJ_{13}	—	March 3, 2006	Catalina	CSS	LIX	4.3 km	MPC; JPL
486657	2013 QT_{24}	—	March 2, 2006	Kitt Peak	Spacewatch	·	2.7 km	MPC; JPL
486658	2013 QE_{32}	—	February 24, 2012	Haleakala	Pan-STARRS 1	H	590 m	MPC; JPL
486659	2013 QK_{43}	—	February 1, 2006	Kitt Peak	Spacewatch	·	2.2 km	MPC; JPL
486660	2013 QU_{51}	—	December 26, 2005	Mount Lemmon	Mount Lemmon Survey	·	2.8 km	MPC; JPL
486661	2013 QL_{55}	—	August 26, 2013	Haleakala	Pan-STARRS 1	·	3.0 km	MPC; JPL
486662	2013 QC_{61}	—	February 10, 2011	Mount Lemmon	Mount Lemmon Survey	·	2.6 km	MPC; JPL
486663	2013 QN_{61}	—	July 14, 2013	Haleakala	Pan-STARRS 1	·	3.0 km	MPC; JPL
486664	2013 QV_{69}	—	January 26, 2012	Haleakala	Pan-STARRS 1	H	530 m	MPC; JPL
486665	2013 QZ_{77}	—	February 10, 2011	Mount Lemmon	Mount Lemmon Survey	HYG	2.6 km	MPC; JPL
486666	2013 QD_{87}	—	April 14, 2010	WISE	WISE	CYB	4.1 km	MPC; JPL
486667	2013 RM_{29}	—	September 6, 2008	Mount Lemmon	Mount Lemmon Survey	H	390 m	MPC; JPL
486668	2013 RO_{43}	—	January 30, 2012	Haleakala	Pan-STARRS 1	H	440 m	MPC; JPL
486669	2013 RU_{51}	—	April 24, 2012	Mount Lemmon	Mount Lemmon Survey	·	3.1 km	MPC; JPL
486670	2013 RW_{61}	—	February 26, 2012	Haleakala	Pan-STARRS 1	H	440 m	MPC; JPL
486671	2013 SP	—	September 25, 2008	Mount Lemmon	Mount Lemmon Survey	H	520 m	MPC; JPL
486672	2013 SR_{75}	—	March 29, 2012	Haleakala	Pan-STARRS 1	H	480 m	MPC; JPL
486673	2013 SZ_{75}	—	February 25, 2006	Kitt Peak	Spacewatch	L5	6.0 km	MPC; JPL
486674	2013 TV_{12}	—	February 28, 2012	Haleakala	Pan-STARRS 1	H	510 m	MPC; JPL
486675	2013 TP_{19}	—	September 1, 2013	Mount Lemmon	Mount Lemmon Survey	L5	7.5 km	MPC; JPL
486676	2013 TX_{25}	—	September 17, 2003	Kitt Peak	Spacewatch	H	370 m	MPC; JPL
486677	2013 TH_{32}	—	April 1, 2008	Kitt Peak	Spacewatch	L5	8.2 km	MPC; JPL
486678	2013 TE_{73}	—	August 26, 2012	Haleakala	Pan-STARRS 1	L5	7.3 km	MPC; JPL
486679	2013 TC_{78}	—	October 7, 2012	Haleakala	Pan-STARRS 1	L5	10 km	MPC; JPL
486680	2013 TV_{78}	—	February 25, 2012	Kitt Peak	Spacewatch	H	480 m	MPC; JPL
486681	2013 TM_{88}	—	March 15, 2007	Kitt Peak	Spacewatch	L5	10 km	MPC; JPL
486682	2013 TA_{98}	—	March 14, 2004	Socorro	LINEAR	H	530 m	MPC; JPL
486683	2013 TD_{111}	—	March 28, 2012	Haleakala	Pan-STARRS 1	H	680 m	MPC; JPL
486684	2013 TN_{113}	—	May 13, 2004	Socorro	LINEAR	H	530 m	MPC; JPL
486685	2013 TV_{113}	—	April 16, 2012	Haleakala	Pan-STARRS 1	·	960 m	MPC; JPL
486686	2013 TD_{117}	—	October 4, 2013	Mount Lemmon	Mount Lemmon Survey	L5	6.9 km	MPC; JPL
486687	2013 TP_{121}	—	March 16, 2012	Haleakala	Pan-STARRS 1	H	430 m	MPC; JPL
486688	2013 UL_{1}	—	August 29, 2005	Kitt Peak	Spacewatch	H	390 m	MPC; JPL
486689	2013 UQ_{3}	—	July 8, 1997	Kitt Peak	Spacewatch	H	670 m	MPC; JPL
486690	2013 UG_{15}	—	October 12, 2013	Mount Lemmon	Mount Lemmon Survey	L5	7.5 km	MPC; JPL
486691	2013 VD_{9}	—	January 23, 2006	Kitt Peak	Spacewatch	L5	9.9 km	MPC; JPL
486692	2013 VC_{13}	—	November 8, 2013	Mount Lemmon	Mount Lemmon Survey	APO	470 m	MPC; JPL
486693	2013 WB	—	July 8, 2005	Kitt Peak	Spacewatch	H	500 m	MPC; JPL
486694	2013 WZ	—	December 1, 2005	Mount Lemmon	Mount Lemmon Survey	H	480 m	MPC; JPL
486695	2013 WP_{63}	—	October 16, 2013	Mount Lemmon	Mount Lemmon Survey	L5 · 010	10 km	MPC; JPL
486696	2013 WD_{64}	—	December 2, 2005	Kitt Peak	Spacewatch	H	480 m	MPC; JPL
486697	2013 WW_{104}	—	March 7, 2009	Siding Spring	SSS	H	520 m	MPC; JPL
486698	2013 XO_{4}	—	February 15, 2012	Haleakala	Pan-STARRS 1	H	530 m	MPC; JPL
486699	2013 XF_{10}	—	February 1, 2009	Catalina	CSS	H	700 m	MPC; JPL
486700	2013 YA_{2}	—	March 1, 2011	Mount Lemmon	Mount Lemmon Survey	·	570 m	MPC; JPL

== 486701–486800 ==
back to top

Designation			Discovery			Properties		Ref
Permanent	Provisional	Named after	Date	Site	Discoverer(s)	Category	Diam.	Ref
486701	2013 YR_{49}	—	May 1, 2011	Haleakala	Pan-STARRS 1	·	1.2 km	MPC; JPL
486702	2013 YA_{78}	—	October 21, 2003	Kitt Peak	Spacewatch	·	540 m	MPC; JPL
486703	2013 YQ_{104}	—	November 7, 2010	Catalina	CSS	H	690 m	MPC; JPL
486704	2013 YB_{115}	—	December 30, 2013	Kitt Peak	Spacewatch	·	830 m	MPC; JPL
486705	2014 AT_{16}	—	January 4, 2014	Haleakala	Pan-STARRS 1	H	510 m	MPC; JPL
486706	2014 AA_{29}	—	January 20, 2009	Mount Lemmon	Mount Lemmon Survey	H	630 m	MPC; JPL
486707	2014 AP_{41}	—	August 26, 2012	Haleakala	Pan-STARRS 1	·	720 m	MPC; JPL
486708	2014 AZ_{41}	—	January 2, 2014	Kitt Peak	Spacewatch	H	430 m	MPC; JPL
486709	2014 AN_{43}	—	June 9, 2012	Haleakala	Pan-STARRS 1	H	630 m	MPC; JPL
486710	2014 AH_{49}	—	March 5, 2011	Mount Lemmon	Mount Lemmon Survey	·	1.2 km	MPC; JPL
486711	2014 BJ_{8}	—	January 19, 2014	Haleakala	Pan-STARRS 1	H	570 m	MPC; JPL
486712	2014 BB_{20}	—	November 1, 2013	Mount Lemmon	Mount Lemmon Survey	·	760 m	MPC; JPL
486713	2014 BV_{22}	—	May 6, 2011	Catalina	CSS	PHO	1.1 km	MPC; JPL
486714	2014 BF_{33}	—	January 9, 2014	Haleakala	Pan-STARRS 1	H	510 m	MPC; JPL
486715	2014 BN_{37}	—	January 23, 2014	Kitt Peak	Spacewatch	V	740 m	MPC; JPL
486716	2014 BD_{43}	—	December 31, 2002	Socorro	LINEAR	H	540 m	MPC; JPL
486717	2014 BU_{54}	—	January 31, 2003	Socorro	LINEAR	H	530 m	MPC; JPL
486718	2014 BP_{57}	—	September 7, 2004	Socorro	LINEAR	H	530 m	MPC; JPL
486719	2014 BY_{60}	—	December 26, 2013	Mount Lemmon	Mount Lemmon Survey	H	460 m	MPC; JPL
486720	2014 CP	—	June 12, 2012	Haleakala	Pan-STARRS 1	H	600 m	MPC; JPL
486721	2014 CJ_{17}	—	March 10, 2007	Mount Lemmon	Mount Lemmon Survey	·	1.0 km	MPC; JPL
486722	2014 DS_{2}	—	September 11, 2012	Siding Spring	SSS	H	530 m	MPC; JPL
486723	2014 DY_{6}	—	August 26, 2012	Mount Lemmon	Mount Lemmon Survey	H	530 m	MPC; JPL
486724	2014 DN_{9}	—	January 3, 2014	Mount Lemmon	Mount Lemmon Survey	·	790 m	MPC; JPL
486725	2014 DZ_{17}	—	October 11, 2010	Mount Lemmon	Mount Lemmon Survey	·	750 m	MPC; JPL
486726	2014 DG_{38}	—	September 30, 2005	Mount Lemmon	Mount Lemmon Survey	·	660 m	MPC; JPL
486727	2014 DN_{38}	—	February 22, 2014	Mount Lemmon	Mount Lemmon Survey	·	660 m	MPC; JPL
486728	2014 DG_{43}	—	October 15, 2012	Haleakala	Pan-STARRS 1	·	620 m	MPC; JPL
486729	2014 DO_{55}	—	April 16, 2004	Kitt Peak	Spacewatch	·	690 m	MPC; JPL
486730	2014 DF_{58}	—	February 26, 2014	Haleakala	Pan-STARRS 1	·	560 m	MPC; JPL
486731	2014 DS_{66}	—	October 7, 2012	Haleakala	Pan-STARRS 1	V	560 m	MPC; JPL
486732	2014 DS_{73}	—	February 10, 2014	Haleakala	Pan-STARRS 1	·	1.4 km	MPC; JPL
486733	2014 DA_{112}	—	January 17, 2007	Kitt Peak	Spacewatch	·	510 m	MPC; JPL
486734	2014 DM_{116}	—	October 8, 2012	Haleakala	Pan-STARRS 1	·	860 m	MPC; JPL
486735	2014 DQ_{122}	—	April 7, 2011	Kitt Peak	Spacewatch	·	530 m	MPC; JPL
486736	2014 DQ_{140}	—	September 30, 2005	Kitt Peak	Spacewatch	·	660 m	MPC; JPL
486737	2014 EZ_{5}	—	February 28, 2014	Haleakala	Pan-STARRS 1	·	670 m	MPC; JPL
486738	2014 EU_{23}	—	October 17, 2012	Haleakala	Pan-STARRS 1	·	640 m	MPC; JPL
486739	2014 EW_{24}	—	March 8, 2014	Mount Lemmon	Mount Lemmon Survey	APO	430 m	MPC; JPL
486740	2014 EO_{32}	—	March 15, 2004	Kitt Peak	Spacewatch	·	550 m	MPC; JPL
486741	2014 EE_{34}	—	January 26, 2007	Kitt Peak	Spacewatch	·	840 m	MPC; JPL
486742	2014 EM_{34}	—	April 2, 2011	Kitt Peak	Spacewatch	·	550 m	MPC; JPL
486743	2014 EW_{38}	—	November 9, 2009	Kitt Peak	Spacewatch	·	710 m	MPC; JPL
486744	2014 EK_{39}	—	February 26, 2014	Haleakala	Pan-STARRS 1	·	770 m	MPC; JPL
486745	2014 EX_{45}	—	August 14, 2012	Haleakala	Pan-STARRS 1	PHO	720 m	MPC; JPL
486746	2014 EX_{49}	—	March 25, 2007	Mount Lemmon	Mount Lemmon Survey	·	900 m	MPC; JPL
486747	2014 FN_{3}	—	December 10, 2009	Mount Lemmon	Mount Lemmon Survey	·	760 m	MPC; JPL
486748	2014 FH_{10}	—	February 26, 2014	Haleakala	Pan-STARRS 1	·	700 m	MPC; JPL
486749	2014 FU_{10}	—	August 11, 2012	Haleakala	Pan-STARRS 1	·	1.3 km	MPC; JPL
486750	2014 FO_{36}	—	October 21, 2012	Haleakala	Pan-STARRS 1	·	820 m	MPC; JPL
486751	2014 FX_{36}	—	December 12, 2012	Mount Lemmon	Mount Lemmon Survey	MAR	1 km	MPC; JPL
486752	2014 FL_{37}	—	September 23, 2008	Mount Lemmon	Mount Lemmon Survey	V	570 m	MPC; JPL
486753	2014 FC_{42}	—	March 27, 2014	Haleakala	Pan-STARRS 1	·	620 m	MPC; JPL
486754	2014 FQ_{51}	—	August 10, 2011	Haleakala	Pan-STARRS 1	·	980 m	MPC; JPL
486755	2014 FE_{53}	—	November 7, 2012	Haleakala	Pan-STARRS 1	·	630 m	MPC; JPL
486756	2014 FQ_{54}	—	March 17, 1993	La Silla	UESAC	·	1.6 km	MPC; JPL
486757	2014 FO_{56}	—	October 17, 2012	Haleakala	Pan-STARRS 1	PHO	770 m	MPC; JPL
486758	2014 FV_{56}	—	February 10, 2014	Haleakala	Pan-STARRS 1	·	780 m	MPC; JPL
486759	2014 FT_{62}	—	January 10, 2014	Haleakala	Pan-STARRS 1	·	2.1 km	MPC; JPL
486760	2014 GJ_{2}	—	September 23, 2011	Haleakala	Pan-STARRS 1	KOR	1.3 km	MPC; JPL
486761	2014 GH_{12}	—	February 28, 2014	Haleakala	Pan-STARRS 1	·	610 m	MPC; JPL
486762	2014 GH_{26}	—	April 15, 2007	Kitt Peak	Spacewatch	·	690 m	MPC; JPL
486763	2014 GR_{31}	—	February 10, 2007	Mount Lemmon	Mount Lemmon Survey	·	630 m	MPC; JPL
486764	2014 GU_{33}	—	May 24, 2011	Haleakala	Pan-STARRS 1	·	590 m	MPC; JPL
486765	2014 GN_{39}	—	October 12, 2005	Kitt Peak	Spacewatch	·	690 m	MPC; JPL
486766	2014 GU_{42}	—	May 10, 2007	Mount Lemmon	Mount Lemmon Survey	·	810 m	MPC; JPL
486767	2014 GV_{42}	—	April 19, 2007	Mount Lemmon	Mount Lemmon Survey	·	790 m	MPC; JPL
486768	2014 GE_{44}	—	November 14, 2012	Mount Lemmon	Mount Lemmon Survey	·	670 m	MPC; JPL
486769	2014 GG_{46}	—	January 26, 2001	Kitt Peak	Spacewatch	·	530 m	MPC; JPL
486770	2014 GO_{49}	—	June 19, 2006	Mount Lemmon	Mount Lemmon Survey	·	1.9 km	MPC; JPL
486771	2014 GP_{49}	—	August 22, 2006	Siding Spring	SSS	·	2.2 km	MPC; JPL
486772	2014 HE	—	March 25, 2014	Kitt Peak	Spacewatch	V	620 m	MPC; JPL
486773	2014 HD_{1}	—	October 27, 2005	Kitt Peak	Spacewatch	·	710 m	MPC; JPL
486774	2014 HP_{8}	—	December 2, 2005	Kitt Peak	Spacewatch	V	470 m	MPC; JPL
486775	2014 HU_{12}	—	April 18, 2007	Mount Lemmon	Mount Lemmon Survey	·	660 m	MPC; JPL
486776	2014 HK_{17}	—	October 27, 2005	Mount Lemmon	Mount Lemmon Survey	·	670 m	MPC; JPL
486777	2014 HY_{19}	—	September 5, 2008	Kitt Peak	Spacewatch	·	680 m	MPC; JPL
486778	2014 HQ_{23}	—	March 27, 2014	Haleakala	Pan-STARRS 1	·	1.1 km	MPC; JPL
486779	2014 HF_{27}	—	March 15, 2007	Kitt Peak	Spacewatch	·	690 m	MPC; JPL
486780	2014 HW_{28}	—	April 2, 2014	Mount Lemmon	Mount Lemmon Survey	·	550 m	MPC; JPL
486781	2014 HG_{29}	—	August 23, 2011	Haleakala	Pan-STARRS 1	·	1.0 km	MPC; JPL
486782	2014 HK_{29}	—	March 3, 2000	Kitt Peak	Spacewatch	·	590 m	MPC; JPL
486783	2014 HN_{37}	—	February 25, 2007	Mount Lemmon	Mount Lemmon Survey	·	650 m	MPC; JPL
486784	2014 HB_{41}	—	January 11, 2010	Kitt Peak	Spacewatch	·	860 m	MPC; JPL
486785	2014 HB_{61}	—	December 3, 2012	Catalina	CSS	EUN	1.2 km	MPC; JPL
486786	2014 HT_{71}	—	October 5, 2012	Haleakala	Pan-STARRS 1	·	660 m	MPC; JPL
486787	2014 HH_{79}	—	August 24, 2011	Haleakala	Pan-STARRS 1	·	880 m	MPC; JPL
486788	2014 HS_{84}	—	November 4, 2005	Mount Lemmon	Mount Lemmon Survey	·	750 m	MPC; JPL
486789	2014 HE_{93}	—	February 23, 2007	Kitt Peak	Spacewatch	·	590 m	MPC; JPL
486790	2014 HM_{143}	—	October 1, 2008	Mount Lemmon	Mount Lemmon Survey	·	1.2 km	MPC; JPL
486791	2014 HU_{146}	—	August 29, 2011	Siding Spring	SSS	·	1.0 km	MPC; JPL
486792	2014 HF_{147}	—	March 10, 2014	Kitt Peak	Spacewatch	·	650 m	MPC; JPL
486793	2014 HT_{149}	—	March 13, 2007	Mount Lemmon	Mount Lemmon Survey	·	790 m	MPC; JPL
486794	2014 HQ_{156}	—	August 24, 2011	La Sagra	OAM	·	1.3 km	MPC; JPL
486795	2014 HG_{158}	—	November 17, 2009	Mount Lemmon	Mount Lemmon Survey	·	600 m	MPC; JPL
486796	2014 HC_{160}	—	January 30, 2006	Kitt Peak	Spacewatch	·	1.2 km	MPC; JPL
486797	2014 HG_{161}	—	February 28, 2014	Haleakala	Pan-STARRS 1	·	1.3 km	MPC; JPL
486798	2014 HO_{163}	—	December 26, 2006	Kitt Peak	Spacewatch	·	620 m	MPC; JPL
486799	2014 HN_{164}	—	December 8, 2012	Mount Lemmon	Mount Lemmon Survey	·	640 m	MPC; JPL
486800	2014 HC_{169}	—	April 28, 2014	Haleakala	Pan-STARRS 1	MAR	970 m	MPC; JPL

== 486801–486900 ==
back to top

Designation			Discovery			Properties		Ref
Permanent	Provisional	Named after	Date	Site	Discoverer(s)	Category	Diam.	Ref
486801	2014 HQ_{171}	—	February 9, 2013	Haleakala	Pan-STARRS 1	·	3.4 km	MPC; JPL
486802	2014 HR_{172}	—	January 7, 2013	Haleakala	Pan-STARRS 1	·	870 m	MPC; JPL
486803	2014 HT_{176}	—	April 14, 2007	Mount Lemmon	Mount Lemmon Survey	·	870 m	MPC; JPL
486804	2014 HY_{180}	—	April 4, 2014	Kitt Peak	Spacewatch	V	530 m	MPC; JPL
486805	2014 HK_{183}	—	April 15, 2007	Kitt Peak	Spacewatch	·	650 m	MPC; JPL
486806	2014 HV_{184}	—	September 20, 2011	Haleakala	Pan-STARRS 1	V	610 m	MPC; JPL
486807	2014 HG_{185}	—	February 14, 2010	Mount Lemmon	Mount Lemmon Survey	·	810 m	MPC; JPL
486808	2014 HO_{186}	—	April 29, 2014	Haleakala	Pan-STARRS 1	EOS	1.7 km	MPC; JPL
486809	2014 HP_{187}	—	March 28, 2014	Haleakala	Pan-STARRS 1	·	950 m	MPC; JPL
486810	2014 JS	—	November 25, 2011	Haleakala	Pan-STARRS 1	EOS	2.4 km	MPC; JPL
486811	2014 JO_{4}	—	March 26, 2014	Mount Lemmon	Mount Lemmon Survey	·	610 m	MPC; JPL
486812	2014 JA_{13}	—	October 25, 2012	Kitt Peak	Spacewatch	·	1.0 km	MPC; JPL
486813	2014 JL_{15}	—	July 9, 2011	Haleakala	Pan-STARRS 1	slow	1.2 km	MPC; JPL
486814	2014 JW_{16}	—	May 2, 2014	Kitt Peak	Spacewatch	·	2.9 km	MPC; JPL
486815	2014 JY_{16}	—	April 4, 2014	Haleakala	Pan-STARRS 1	·	1.2 km	MPC; JPL
486816	2014 JF_{17}	—	August 24, 2011	Haleakala	Pan-STARRS 1	·	820 m	MPC; JPL
486817	2014 JX_{18}	—	September 11, 2005	Kitt Peak	Spacewatch	·	690 m	MPC; JPL
486818	2014 JD_{21}	—	March 9, 2014	Haleakala	Pan-STARRS 1	·	970 m	MPC; JPL
486819	2014 JR_{22}	—	May 9, 1996	Kitt Peak	Spacewatch	·	970 m	MPC; JPL
486820	2014 JG_{23}	—	February 14, 2013	Haleakala	Pan-STARRS 1	·	1.8 km	MPC; JPL
486821	2014 JA_{24}	—	June 5, 1997	Kitt Peak	Spacewatch	·	660 m	MPC; JPL
486822	2014 JL_{24}	—	April 4, 2014	Haleakala	Pan-STARRS 1	·	1.2 km	MPC; JPL
486823	2014 JU_{25}	—	August 1, 2011	La Sagra	OAM	PHO	1.0 km	MPC; JPL
486824	2014 JD_{27}	—	February 9, 2013	Haleakala	Pan-STARRS 1	·	2.7 km	MPC; JPL
486825	2014 JJ_{27}	—	April 8, 2014	Haleakala	Pan-STARRS 1	·	3.6 km	MPC; JPL
486826	2014 JU_{27}	—	April 6, 2014	Mount Lemmon	Mount Lemmon Survey	ADE	1.8 km	MPC; JPL
486827	2014 JK_{29}	—	September 19, 2011	Haleakala	Pan-STARRS 1	V	890 m	MPC; JPL
486828	2014 JA_{33}	—	August 30, 2011	Haleakala	Pan-STARRS 1	·	1.2 km	MPC; JPL
486829	2014 JC_{33}	—	April 26, 2007	Mount Lemmon	Mount Lemmon Survey	(2076)	780 m	MPC; JPL
486830	2014 JY_{36}	—	August 2, 2011	Haleakala	Pan-STARRS 1	·	1.3 km	MPC; JPL
486831	2014 JK_{37}	—	May 4, 2014	Haleakala	Pan-STARRS 1	·	920 m	MPC; JPL
486832	2014 JB_{39}	—	April 13, 2004	Kitt Peak	Spacewatch	·	490 m	MPC; JPL
486833	2014 JW_{39}	—	March 12, 2014	Haleakala	Pan-STARRS 1	ADE	2.2 km	MPC; JPL
486834	2014 JV_{43}	—	October 26, 2011	Haleakala	Pan-STARRS 1	·	2.5 km	MPC; JPL
486835	2014 JY_{43}	—	January 17, 2007	Kitt Peak	Spacewatch	·	640 m	MPC; JPL
486836	2014 JC_{44}	—	October 21, 2012	Haleakala	Pan-STARRS 1	·	630 m	MPC; JPL
486837	2014 JC_{45}	—	December 8, 2012	Mount Lemmon	Mount Lemmon Survey	·	1.0 km	MPC; JPL
486838	2014 JU_{46}	—	February 16, 2010	Mount Lemmon	Mount Lemmon Survey	PHO	770 m	MPC; JPL
486839	2014 JN_{48}	—	October 28, 2005	Kitt Peak	Spacewatch	·	840 m	MPC; JPL
486840	2014 JZ_{48}	—	May 8, 2014	Haleakala	Pan-STARRS 1	·	1.1 km	MPC; JPL
486841	2014 JN_{49}	—	October 23, 2011	Haleakala	Pan-STARRS 1	EUN	1.5 km	MPC; JPL
486842	2014 JR_{49}	—	March 28, 2014	Mount Lemmon	Mount Lemmon Survey	·	800 m	MPC; JPL
486843	2014 JP_{51}	—	September 23, 2011	Haleakala	Pan-STARRS 1	·	1.0 km	MPC; JPL
486844	2014 JY_{53}	—	February 9, 2010	Kitt Peak	Spacewatch	MAS	680 m	MPC; JPL
486845	2014 JW_{57}	—	November 19, 2003	Kitt Peak	Spacewatch	·	1.2 km	MPC; JPL
486846	2014 JF_{60}	—	March 15, 2007	Mount Lemmon	Mount Lemmon Survey	·	620 m	MPC; JPL
486847	2014 JD_{62}	—	March 10, 2005	Mount Lemmon	Mount Lemmon Survey	MAR	1.0 km	MPC; JPL
486848	2014 JY_{63}	—	September 23, 2011	Haleakala	Pan-STARRS 1	NYS	1.2 km	MPC; JPL
486849	2014 JF_{67}	—	May 8, 2014	Haleakala	Pan-STARRS 1	·	1.1 km	MPC; JPL
486850	2014 JC_{68}	—	March 15, 2007	Mount Lemmon	Mount Lemmon Survey	(2076)	610 m	MPC; JPL
486851	2014 JS_{68}	—	September 23, 2008	Kitt Peak	Spacewatch	·	970 m	MPC; JPL
486852	2014 JS_{73}	—	April 16, 2007	Mount Lemmon	Mount Lemmon Survey	·	530 m	MPC; JPL
486853	2014 JN_{74}	—	November 24, 2012	Kitt Peak	Spacewatch	·	980 m	MPC; JPL
486854	2014 JO_{74}	—	January 26, 2006	Kitt Peak	Spacewatch	NYS	930 m	MPC; JPL
486855	2014 JV_{75}	—	August 31, 2011	Haleakala	Pan-STARRS 1	V	560 m	MPC; JPL
486856	2014 JH_{79}	—	October 24, 2005	Anderson Mesa	LONEOS	·	870 m	MPC; JPL
486857	2014 KB_{1}	—	April 24, 2014	Haleakala	Pan-STARRS 1	V	600 m	MPC; JPL
486858	2014 KK_{1}	—	May 27, 1998	Kitt Peak	Spacewatch	·	450 m	MPC; JPL
486859	2014 KU_{1}	—	February 28, 2014	Haleakala	Pan-STARRS 1	V	750 m	MPC; JPL
486860	2014 KW_{1}	—	March 26, 2009	Catalina	CSS	·	2.8 km	MPC; JPL
486861	2014 KZ_{2}	—	October 7, 2008	Mount Lemmon	Mount Lemmon Survey	·	560 m	MPC; JPL
486862	2014 KB_{3}	—	March 24, 2014	Haleakala	Pan-STARRS 1	·	2.3 km	MPC; JPL
486863	2014 KL_{6}	—	April 14, 2007	Mount Lemmon	Mount Lemmon Survey	·	990 m	MPC; JPL
486864	2014 KB_{10}	—	June 11, 2011	Haleakala	Pan-STARRS 1	·	1.7 km	MPC; JPL
486865	2014 KH_{15}	—	October 23, 2008	Kitt Peak	Spacewatch	·	2.2 km	MPC; JPL
486866	2014 KF_{18}	—	March 14, 2010	Mount Lemmon	Mount Lemmon Survey	·	910 m	MPC; JPL
486867	2014 KR_{28}	—	March 12, 2002	Kitt Peak	Spacewatch	·	1.3 km	MPC; JPL
486868	2014 KQ_{30}	—	March 9, 2010	WISE	WISE	·	2.6 km	MPC; JPL
486869	2014 KE_{31}	—	February 28, 2014	Haleakala	Pan-STARRS 1	·	810 m	MPC; JPL
486870	2014 KM_{32}	—	October 26, 2011	Haleakala	Pan-STARRS 1	·	1.8 km	MPC; JPL
486871	2014 KY_{32}	—	October 5, 2011	Haleakala	Pan-STARRS 1	·	1.4 km	MPC; JPL
486872	2014 KA_{44}	—	May 21, 2010	Mount Lemmon	Mount Lemmon Survey	EUN	900 m	MPC; JPL
486873	2014 KP_{44}	—	April 16, 2010	WISE	WISE	·	2.6 km	MPC; JPL
486874	2014 KG_{50}	—	April 1, 2014	Kitt Peak	Spacewatch	MAS	670 m	MPC; JPL
486875	2014 KZ_{51}	—	April 11, 2010	WISE	WISE	KRM	3.0 km	MPC; JPL
486876	2014 KL_{52}	—	October 26, 2011	Haleakala	Pan-STARRS 1	·	1.7 km	MPC; JPL
486877	2014 KL_{53}	—	April 4, 2014	Haleakala	Pan-STARRS 1	·	860 m	MPC; JPL
486878	2014 KO_{53}	—	October 26, 2011	Haleakala	Pan-STARRS 1	·	1.1 km	MPC; JPL
486879	2014 KR_{54}	—	March 11, 2007	Kitt Peak	Spacewatch	·	770 m	MPC; JPL
486880	2014 KW_{54}	—	May 7, 2014	Haleakala	Pan-STARRS 1	EOS	1.8 km	MPC; JPL
486881	2014 KH_{57}	—	September 18, 2011	Mount Lemmon	Mount Lemmon Survey	V	560 m	MPC; JPL
486882	2014 KU_{58}	—	January 3, 2013	Haleakala	Pan-STARRS 1	MAR	1.3 km	MPC; JPL
486883	2014 KH_{62}	—	November 30, 2008	Kitt Peak	Spacewatch	·	1.2 km	MPC; JPL
486884	2014 KK_{62}	—	May 7, 2014	Haleakala	Pan-STARRS 1	·	1.4 km	MPC; JPL
486885	2014 KB_{65}	—	December 1, 2008	Kitt Peak	Spacewatch	·	1.2 km	MPC; JPL
486886	2014 KB_{67}	—	July 4, 2010	WISE	WISE	·	1.7 km	MPC; JPL
486887	2014 KT_{67}	—	February 28, 2014	Haleakala	Pan-STARRS 1	·	630 m	MPC; JPL
486888	2014 KP_{70}	—	September 23, 2011	Haleakala	Pan-STARRS 1	·	1.0 km	MPC; JPL
486889	2014 KQ_{72}	—	May 7, 2014	Haleakala	Pan-STARRS 1	·	1.3 km	MPC; JPL
486890	2014 KO_{78}	—	December 5, 2005	Mount Lemmon	Mount Lemmon Survey	NYS	760 m	MPC; JPL
486891	2014 KT_{78}	—	October 25, 2005	Kitt Peak	Spacewatch	·	680 m	MPC; JPL
486892	2014 KR_{80}	—	July 28, 2011	Haleakala	Pan-STARRS 1	·	970 m	MPC; JPL
486893	2014 KB_{81}	—	January 31, 2006	Kitt Peak	Spacewatch	·	1.0 km	MPC; JPL
486894	2014 KC_{81}	—	April 3, 2014	Haleakala	Pan-STARRS 1	·	1.1 km	MPC; JPL
486895	2014 KL_{86}	—	October 26, 2011	Haleakala	Pan-STARRS 1	·	1.8 km	MPC; JPL
486896	2014 KT_{87}	—	March 31, 2014	Kitt Peak	Spacewatch	V	600 m	MPC; JPL
486897	2014 KX_{87}	—	May 7, 2014	Haleakala	Pan-STARRS 1	·	2.1 km	MPC; JPL
486898 LaForge	2014 KF_{93}	LaForge	March 8, 2013	Haleakala	Pan-STARRS 1	EOS	1.7 km	MPC; JPL
486899	2014 KF_{94}	—	March 20, 2010	Catalina	CSS	PHO	2.2 km	MPC; JPL
486900	2014 KJ_{94}	—	April 24, 2003	Kitt Peak	Spacewatch	·	1.6 km	MPC; JPL

== 486901–487000 ==
back to top

Designation			Discovery			Properties		Ref
Permanent	Provisional	Named after	Date	Site	Discoverer(s)	Category	Diam.	Ref
486901	2014 KT_{94}	—	May 7, 2014	Haleakala	Pan-STARRS 1	·	1.3 km	MPC; JPL
486902	2014 KF_{95}	—	November 6, 2012	Kitt Peak	Spacewatch	·	560 m	MPC; JPL
486903	2014 KQ_{95}	—	September 4, 2008	Kitt Peak	Spacewatch	·	1.1 km	MPC; JPL
486904	2014 KJ_{98}	—	March 29, 2007	Kitt Peak	Spacewatch	·	530 m	MPC; JPL
486905	2014 LA_{1}	—	March 2, 2009	Mount Lemmon	Mount Lemmon Survey	·	1.6 km	MPC; JPL
486906	2014 LS_{1}	—	April 21, 2014	Kitt Peak	Spacewatch	·	1.1 km	MPC; JPL
486907	2014 LX_{2}	—	October 15, 2007	Catalina	CSS	·	1.4 km	MPC; JPL
486908	2014 LM_{6}	—	March 3, 2006	Kitt Peak	Spacewatch	·	1.0 km	MPC; JPL
486909	2014 LE_{8}	—	May 7, 2014	Haleakala	Pan-STARRS 1	·	1.2 km	MPC; JPL
486910	2014 LY_{11}	—	October 25, 2011	Haleakala	Pan-STARRS 1	·	1.3 km	MPC; JPL
486911	2014 LC_{12}	—	February 15, 2010	Mount Lemmon	Mount Lemmon Survey	·	850 m	MPC; JPL
486912	2014 LE_{13}	—	September 19, 2011	Haleakala	Pan-STARRS 1	V	590 m	MPC; JPL
486913	2014 LG_{14}	—	January 28, 2006	Kitt Peak	Spacewatch	·	1.3 km	MPC; JPL
486914	2014 LA_{16}	—	May 7, 2014	Haleakala	Pan-STARRS 1	·	1.5 km	MPC; JPL
486915	2014 LP_{17}	—	October 6, 2002	Socorro	LINEAR	·	1.3 km	MPC; JPL
486916	2014 LS_{19}	—	January 26, 2006	Kitt Peak	Spacewatch	·	950 m	MPC; JPL
486917	2014 LP_{23}	—	September 21, 2011	Mount Lemmon	Mount Lemmon Survey	·	680 m	MPC; JPL
486918	2014 LC_{28}	—	April 10, 2014	Haleakala	Pan-STARRS 1	·	2.0 km	MPC; JPL
486919	2014 MK_{2}	—	August 27, 2011	Haleakala	Pan-STARRS 1	·	860 m	MPC; JPL
486920	2014 MK_{4}	—	May 6, 2014	Haleakala	Pan-STARRS 1	·	4.4 km	MPC; JPL
486921	2014 MB_{7}	—	July 27, 2010	WISE	WISE	PHO	2.9 km	MPC; JPL
486922	2014 ML_{9}	—	October 2, 2006	Mount Lemmon	Mount Lemmon Survey	·	1.4 km	MPC; JPL
486923	2014 MH_{15}	—	September 12, 2010	La Sagra	OAM	EUN	1.1 km	MPC; JPL
486924	2014 MJ_{17}	—	February 1, 2006	Kitt Peak	Spacewatch	·	2.9 km	MPC; JPL
486925	2014 MQ_{21}	—	June 11, 2011	Haleakala	Pan-STARRS 1	·	930 m	MPC; JPL
486926	2014 MX_{21}	—	May 6, 2014	Haleakala	Pan-STARRS 1	EUN	1.3 km	MPC; JPL
486927	2014 MM_{22}	—	September 18, 2010	Mount Lemmon	Mount Lemmon Survey	·	1.4 km	MPC; JPL
486928	2014 MR_{22}	—	June 3, 2014	Haleakala	Pan-STARRS 1	MAR	1.5 km	MPC; JPL
486929	2014 MA_{23}	—	October 20, 2011	Catalina	CSS	MAR	920 m	MPC; JPL
486930	2014 MW_{23}	—	January 16, 2007	Mount Lemmon	Mount Lemmon Survey	·	1.9 km	MPC; JPL
486931	2014 MO_{25}	—	December 30, 2007	Mount Lemmon	Mount Lemmon Survey	·	1.8 km	MPC; JPL
486932	2014 MN_{31}	—	January 19, 2012	Haleakala	Pan-STARRS 1	·	2.9 km	MPC; JPL
486933	2014 MV_{31}	—	January 7, 2013	Kitt Peak	Spacewatch	V	690 m	MPC; JPL
486934	2014 MP_{32}	—	October 25, 2011	Haleakala	Pan-STARRS 1	·	1.2 km	MPC; JPL
486935	2014 MP_{35}	—	April 3, 2014	Haleakala	Pan-STARRS 1	·	680 m	MPC; JPL
486936	2014 MF_{36}	—	February 3, 2012	Haleakala	Pan-STARRS 1	·	1.9 km	MPC; JPL
486937	2014 MH_{36}	—	January 19, 2012	Haleakala	Pan-STARRS 1	·	2.4 km	MPC; JPL
486938	2014 MC_{37}	—	June 4, 2014	Haleakala	Pan-STARRS 1	·	1.7 km	MPC; JPL
486939	2014 MU_{37}	—	January 10, 2008	Mount Lemmon	Mount Lemmon Survey	·	1.4 km	MPC; JPL
486940	2014 MV_{37}	—	January 30, 2010	WISE	WISE	·	2.8 km	MPC; JPL
486941	2014 MZ_{37}	—	May 3, 2008	Mount Lemmon	Mount Lemmon Survey	·	2.0 km	MPC; JPL
486942	2014 MQ_{43}	—	February 14, 2010	Mount Lemmon	Mount Lemmon Survey	·	1 km	MPC; JPL
486943	2014 MW_{48}	—	June 20, 2014	Haleakala	Pan-STARRS 1	MAR	1.1 km	MPC; JPL
486944	2014 MZ_{48}	—	April 10, 2013	Haleakala	Pan-STARRS 1	·	2.4 km	MPC; JPL
486945	2014 MO_{49}	—	January 23, 2006	Kitt Peak	Spacewatch	·	1.0 km	MPC; JPL
486946	2014 MG_{50}	—	May 7, 2014	Haleakala	Pan-STARRS 1	·	2.2 km	MPC; JPL
486947	2014 MQ_{50}	—	April 16, 2013	Haleakala	Pan-STARRS 1	·	3.2 km	MPC; JPL
486948	2014 MO_{51}	—	June 3, 2014	Haleakala	Pan-STARRS 1	·	1.9 km	MPC; JPL
486949	2014 MV_{52}	—	June 3, 2014	Haleakala	Pan-STARRS 1	·	1.5 km	MPC; JPL
486950	2014 MH_{53}	—	February 8, 2013	Haleakala	Pan-STARRS 1	·	900 m	MPC; JPL
486951	2014 MP_{56}	—	April 14, 2005	Kitt Peak	Spacewatch	·	1.0 km	MPC; JPL
486952	2014 MB_{60}	—	January 15, 2010	WISE	WISE	·	4.3 km	MPC; JPL
486953	2014 MS_{61}	—	March 2, 2009	Mount Lemmon	Mount Lemmon Survey	·	1.6 km	MPC; JPL
486954	2014 MN_{63}	—	November 18, 2007	Mount Lemmon	Mount Lemmon Survey	·	1.6 km	MPC; JPL
486955	2014 MS_{63}	—	June 2, 2014	Mount Lemmon	Mount Lemmon Survey	·	2.4 km	MPC; JPL
486956	2014 MA_{64}	—	July 1, 2014	Kitt Peak	Spacewatch	·	2.0 km	MPC; JPL
486957	2014 MK_{66}	—	May 12, 2013	Mount Lemmon	Mount Lemmon Survey	·	2.7 km	MPC; JPL
486958 Arrokoth	2014 MU_{69}	Arrokoth	June 26, 2014	HST	Buie, M. W., New Horizons Search Team	cubewano (cold)	25 km	MPC; JPL
486959	2014 NX_{1}	—	February 13, 2007	Mount Lemmon	Mount Lemmon Survey	·	2.9 km	MPC; JPL
486960	2014 NJ_{2}	—	June 22, 2014	Kitt Peak	Spacewatch	BRA	1.3 km	MPC; JPL
486961	2014 NC_{4}	—	June 21, 2014	Haleakala	Pan-STARRS 1	·	1.8 km	MPC; JPL
486962	2014 NE_{5}	—	May 20, 2010	WISE	WISE	·	2.2 km	MPC; JPL
486963	2014 NK_{8}	—	March 5, 2006	Kitt Peak	Spacewatch	·	1.0 km	MPC; JPL
486964	2014 NL_{9}	—	December 31, 2007	Mount Lemmon	Mount Lemmon Survey	·	1.5 km	MPC; JPL
486965	2014 NO_{13}	—	May 27, 2014	Mount Lemmon	Mount Lemmon Survey	·	3.3 km	MPC; JPL
486966	2014 NX_{15}	—	November 19, 2007	Kitt Peak	Spacewatch	EUN	2.0 km	MPC; JPL
486967	2014 NU_{16}	—	September 16, 2006	Catalina	CSS	·	1.6 km	MPC; JPL
486968	2014 NA_{17}	—	May 6, 2014	Haleakala	Pan-STARRS 1	·	2.1 km	MPC; JPL
486969	2014 NX_{17}	—	May 11, 2010	Mount Lemmon	Mount Lemmon Survey	·	1.4 km	MPC; JPL
486970	2014 NN_{18}	—	June 5, 2014	Haleakala	Pan-STARRS 1	·	2.8 km	MPC; JPL
486971	2014 NO_{18}	—	March 24, 2006	Kitt Peak	Spacewatch	·	1.2 km	MPC; JPL
486972	2014 NQ_{18}	—	May 9, 2007	Mount Lemmon	Mount Lemmon Survey	PHO	870 m	MPC; JPL
486973	2014 NH_{20}	—	June 3, 2014	Haleakala	Pan-STARRS 1	ADE	1.7 km	MPC; JPL
486974	2014 NY_{20}	—	March 18, 2010	WISE	WISE	PHO	2.3 km	MPC; JPL
486975	2014 NQ_{26}	—	March 31, 2013	Mount Lemmon	Mount Lemmon Survey	·	1.5 km	MPC; JPL
486976	2014 NV_{26}	—	June 13, 2005	Mount Lemmon	Mount Lemmon Survey	·	2.0 km	MPC; JPL
486977	2014 NE_{30}	—	July 2, 2014	Haleakala	Pan-STARRS 1	·	1.6 km	MPC; JPL
486978	2014 NP_{30}	—	June 3, 2014	Haleakala	Pan-STARRS 1	·	2.0 km	MPC; JPL
486979	2014 NW_{30}	—	December 15, 2010	Mount Lemmon	Mount Lemmon Survey	·	3.6 km	MPC; JPL
486980	2014 NT_{32}	—	May 7, 2014	Haleakala	Pan-STARRS 1	MAR	1.2 km	MPC; JPL
486981	2014 NA_{33}	—	October 9, 2010	Mount Lemmon	Mount Lemmon Survey	HOF	2.2 km	MPC; JPL
486982	2014 NW_{34}	—	May 3, 2008	Mount Lemmon	Mount Lemmon Survey	·	3.1 km	MPC; JPL
486983	2014 NZ_{39}	—	November 10, 2004	Kitt Peak	Spacewatch	·	3.6 km	MPC; JPL
486984	2014 NQ_{41}	—	June 22, 2014	Mount Lemmon	Mount Lemmon Survey	·	2.0 km	MPC; JPL
486985	2014 NC_{42}	—	April 16, 2013	Haleakala	Pan-STARRS 1	·	2.4 km	MPC; JPL
486986	2014 NM_{43}	—	April 5, 2005	Mount Lemmon	Mount Lemmon Survey	·	1.2 km	MPC; JPL
486987	2014 NN_{45}	—	January 25, 2012	Haleakala	Pan-STARRS 1	NAE	2.4 km	MPC; JPL
486988	2014 NP_{45}	—	June 3, 2014	Haleakala	Pan-STARRS 1	EUN	1.1 km	MPC; JPL
486989	2014 NE_{46}	—	June 24, 2014	Haleakala	Pan-STARRS 1	·	1.8 km	MPC; JPL
486990	2014 NX_{46}	—	April 24, 2012	Haleakala	Pan-STARRS 1	·	3.0 km	MPC; JPL
486991	2014 NP_{47}	—	October 26, 2011	Haleakala	Pan-STARRS 1	·	1.3 km	MPC; JPL
486992	2014 NA_{48}	—	March 2, 2009	Mount Lemmon	Mount Lemmon Survey	·	1.8 km	MPC; JPL
486993	2014 NF_{51}	—	February 19, 2009	Kitt Peak	Spacewatch	·	1.1 km	MPC; JPL
486994	2014 NU_{52}	—	June 27, 2014	Haleakala	Pan-STARRS 1	·	3.7 km	MPC; JPL
486995	2014 NG_{54}	—	March 19, 2013	Haleakala	Pan-STARRS 1	·	1.3 km	MPC; JPL
486996	2014 NK_{54}	—	August 19, 2006	Kitt Peak	Spacewatch	MAR	990 m	MPC; JPL
486997	2014 NQ_{54}	—	April 24, 2007	Mount Lemmon	Mount Lemmon Survey	·	3.0 km	MPC; JPL
486998	2014 NL_{55}	—	February 2, 2006	Kitt Peak	Spacewatch	·	3.5 km	MPC; JPL
486999	2014 NO_{55}	—	July 6, 2014	Haleakala	Pan-STARRS 1	BRA	1.8 km	MPC; JPL
487000	2014 NE_{56}	—	April 19, 2013	Haleakala	Pan-STARRS 1	EOS	1.7 km	MPC; JPL

back to top

== Meaning of names ==
As minor planet discoveries are confirmed, they are given a permanent number by the IAU's Minor Planet Center (MPC), and the discoverers can then submit names for them, following the IAU's naming conventions. The list below concerns those minor planets in the specified number-range that have received names, and explains the meanings of those names.

Official naming citations of newly named small Solar System bodies are approved and published in a bulletin by IAU's Working Group for Small Bodies Nomenclature (WGSBN). Before May 2021, citations were published in MPC's Minor Planet Circulars for many decades. Recent citations can also be found on the JPL Small-Body Database (SBDB). Until his death in 2016, German astronomer Lutz D. Schmadel compiled these citations into the Dictionary of Minor Planet Names (DMP) and regularly updated the collection.

Based on Paul Herget's The Names of the Minor Planets, Schmadel also researched the unclear origin of numerous asteroids, most of which had been named prior to World War II. This article incorporates text from this source, which is in the public domain: SBDB New namings may only be added to this list below after official publication as the preannouncement of names is condemned. The WGSBN publishes a comprehensive guideline for the naming rules of non-cometary small Solar System bodies.

Named minor planet	Provisional	This minor planet was named for...	Ref; Catalog
486170 Zolnowska	2012 YX_{2}	Marta Zolnowska (born 1974) is a child neurologist who has long treated patients with drug-resistant epilepsy.	JPL · 486170
486239 Zosiakaczmarek	2013 BK_{16}	Zosia Kaczmarek (born 1998) is a winner of 59th and 60th Polish Astronomy Olympiad in 2016 and 2017, and silver medalist in 10th International Olympiad on Astronomy and Astrophysics in India.	JPL · 486239
486416 Mami	2013 EZ_{110}	Mami Laher (1954–2019), born in Japan, earned a B.A. in sociology from Utah State University in 1984. She enjoyed jewelry making and figure skating.	JPL · 486416
486898 LaForge	2014 KF_{93}	William N. LaForge (b. 1950), a president of Delta State University in Mississippi, USA, from 2013 to 2022	IAU · 486898
486958 Arrokoth	2014 MU_{69}	Arrokoth is the word for "sky" from the Powhatan language of native people from the Chesapeake Bay region. Institutions in this region played a prominent role in the discovery of this object.	JPL · 486958
