= List of minor planets: 465001–466000 =

The following is a partial list of minor planets, running from minor-planet number 465001 through 466000, inclusive. The primary data for this and other partial lists is based on JPL's "Small-Body Orbital Elements" and data available from the Minor Planet Center. Critical list information is also provided by the MPC, unless otherwise specified from Lowell Observatory. A detailed description of the table's columns and additional sources are given on the main page including a complete list of every page in this series, and a statistical break-up on the dynamical classification of minor planets.

Also see the summary list of all named bodies in numerical and alphabetical order, and the corresponding naming citations for the number range of this particular list. New namings may only be added to this list after official publication, as the preannouncement of names is condemned by the Working Group for Small Bodies Nomenclature of the International Astronomical Union.

Near-Earth obj.	MBA (inner)	MBA (outer)	Centaur
Mars-crosser	MBA (middle)	Jupiter trojan	Trans-Neptunian obj.
Unclassified

== 465001–465100 ==
Designation			Discovery			Properties		Ref
Permanent	Provisional	Named after	Date	Site	Discoverer(s)	Category	Diam.	Ref
465001	2006 DV_{104}	—	February 25, 2006	Kitt Peak	Spacewatch	·	620 m	MPC · JPL
465002	2006 DL_{125}	—	January 30, 2006	Kitt Peak	Spacewatch	·	1.6 km	MPC · JPL
465003	2006 DO_{131}	—	February 25, 2006	Kitt Peak	Spacewatch	·	560 m	MPC · JPL
465004	2006 EE_{49}	—	March 4, 2006	Kitt Peak	Spacewatch	·	560 m	MPC · JPL
465005	2006 FG_{31}	—	February 25, 2006	Kitt Peak	Spacewatch	TRE	3.3 km	MPC · JPL
465006	2006 FT_{41}	—	March 26, 2006	Mount Lemmon	Mount Lemmon Survey	·	1.5 km	MPC · JPL
465007	2006 FZ_{41}	—	March 26, 2006	Mount Lemmon	Mount Lemmon Survey	·	640 m	MPC · JPL
465008	2006 GV_{14}	—	April 2, 2006	Kitt Peak	Spacewatch	·	560 m	MPC · JPL
465009	2006 GN_{33}	—	April 7, 2006	Kitt Peak	Spacewatch	·	720 m	MPC · JPL
465010	2006 GH_{37}	—	April 8, 2006	Kitt Peak	Spacewatch	·	780 m	MPC · JPL
465011	2006 HQ_{14}	—	April 19, 2006	Mount Lemmon	Mount Lemmon Survey	·	750 m	MPC · JPL
465012	2006 HA_{41}	—	April 21, 2006	Kitt Peak	Spacewatch	EOS	1.6 km	MPC · JPL
465013	2006 HG_{64}	—	April 24, 2006	Kitt Peak	Spacewatch	·	2.5 km	MPC · JPL
465014	2006 HJ_{77}	—	April 25, 2006	Kitt Peak	Spacewatch	·	2.1 km	MPC · JPL
465015	2006 HH_{115}	—	April 26, 2006	Kitt Peak	Spacewatch	·	590 m	MPC · JPL
465016	2006 HK_{154}	—	April 30, 2006	Kitt Peak	Spacewatch	·	2.2 km	MPC · JPL
465017	2006 JY_{9}	—	May 1, 2006	Kitt Peak	Spacewatch	EOS	1.8 km	MPC · JPL
465018	2006 JJ_{13}	—	April 21, 2006	Kitt Peak	Spacewatch	LIX	3.4 km	MPC · JPL
465019	2006 JP_{21}	—	May 2, 2006	Kitt Peak	Spacewatch	EOS	1.9 km	MPC · JPL
465020	2006 JX_{32}	—	April 21, 2006	Kitt Peak	Spacewatch	·	3.1 km	MPC · JPL
465021	2006 JS_{36}	—	May 4, 2006	Kitt Peak	Spacewatch	H	510 m	MPC · JPL
465022	2006 JY_{38}	—	May 6, 2006	Mount Lemmon	Mount Lemmon Survey	·	610 m	MPC · JPL
465023	2006 JK_{41}	—	April 29, 2006	Kitt Peak	Spacewatch	·	2.9 km	MPC · JPL
465024	2006 KE_{32}	—	May 20, 2006	Kitt Peak	Spacewatch	·	510 m	MPC · JPL
465025	2006 KK_{35}	—	May 20, 2006	Kitt Peak	Spacewatch	·	2.8 km	MPC · JPL
465026	2006 KH_{45}	—	April 24, 2006	Kitt Peak	Spacewatch	·	610 m	MPC · JPL
465027	2006 KJ_{51}	—	April 26, 2006	Mount Lemmon	Mount Lemmon Survey	·	1.8 km	MPC · JPL
465028	2006 KW_{51}	—	April 30, 2006	Kitt Peak	Spacewatch	·	3.5 km	MPC · JPL
465029	2006 KJ_{59}	—	May 22, 2006	Kitt Peak	Spacewatch	·	650 m	MPC · JPL
465030	2006 KH_{62}	—	May 22, 2006	Kitt Peak	Spacewatch	·	2.4 km	MPC · JPL
465031	2006 KL_{70}	—	May 7, 2006	Mount Lemmon	Mount Lemmon Survey	·	2.0 km	MPC · JPL
465032	2006 KT_{87}	—	May 1, 2006	Kitt Peak	Spacewatch	·	560 m	MPC · JPL
465033	2006 MC_{12}	—	June 21, 2006	Palomar	NEAT	·	990 m	MPC · JPL
465034	2006 PK_{3}	—	May 30, 2006	Mount Lemmon	Mount Lemmon Survey	·	2.6 km	MPC · JPL
465035	2006 PO_{25}	—	May 26, 2006	Mount Lemmon	Mount Lemmon Survey	·	2.7 km	MPC · JPL
465036 Tatm	2006 QK_{13}	Tatm	August 16, 2006	Lulin	C.-S. Lin, Q. Ye	·	3.3 km	MPC · JPL
465037	2006 QH_{23}	—	August 20, 2006	Palomar	NEAT	·	1.1 km	MPC · JPL
465038	2006 QP_{26}	—	August 19, 2006	Palomar	NEAT	PHO	830 m	MPC · JPL
465039	2006 QT_{61}	—	August 22, 2006	Palomar	NEAT	·	1.1 km	MPC · JPL
465040	2006 QN_{62}	—	August 23, 2006	Socorro	LINEAR	·	640 m	MPC · JPL
465041	2006 QA_{64}	—	August 25, 2006	Socorro	LINEAR	·	1.6 km	MPC · JPL
465042	2006 QG_{74}	—	August 21, 2006	Kitt Peak	Spacewatch	·	810 m	MPC · JPL
465043	2006 QE_{81}	—	August 24, 2006	Palomar	NEAT	·	920 m	MPC · JPL
465044	2006 QA_{106}	—	August 28, 2006	Catalina	CSS	·	2.9 km	MPC · JPL
465045	2006 QO_{114}	—	August 27, 2006	Anderson Mesa	LONEOS	·	1.1 km	MPC · JPL
465046	2006 QW_{148}	—	August 18, 2006	Kitt Peak	Spacewatch	·	1.0 km	MPC · JPL
465047	2006 RW_{33}	—	August 27, 2006	Anderson Mesa	LONEOS	·	980 m	MPC · JPL
465048	2006 RY_{41}	—	September 14, 2006	Kitt Peak	Spacewatch	MAS · fast?	770 m	MPC · JPL
465049	2006 RG_{61}	—	August 30, 2006	Anderson Mesa	LONEOS	H	590 m	MPC · JPL
465050	2006 RM_{74}	—	September 15, 2006	Kitt Peak	Spacewatch	·	840 m	MPC · JPL
465051	2006 RW_{80}	—	September 15, 2006	Kitt Peak	Spacewatch	·	770 m	MPC · JPL
465052	2006 RE_{81}	—	September 15, 2006	Kitt Peak	Spacewatch	·	1.1 km	MPC · JPL
465053	2006 RC_{84}	—	September 15, 2006	Kitt Peak	Spacewatch	·	2.7 km	MPC · JPL
465054	2006 SY_{3}	—	September 16, 2006	Catalina	CSS	·	4.7 km	MPC · JPL
465055	2006 SE_{11}	—	September 16, 2006	Kitt Peak	Spacewatch	·	920 m	MPC · JPL
465056	2006 SD_{12}	—	August 29, 2006	Anderson Mesa	LONEOS	T_{j} (2.98)	3.1 km	MPC · JPL
465057	2006 SU_{31}	—	September 17, 2006	Kitt Peak	Spacewatch	·	3.0 km	MPC · JPL
465058	2006 SZ_{35}	—	September 17, 2006	Anderson Mesa	LONEOS	·	1.0 km	MPC · JPL
465059	2006 SF_{41}	—	September 18, 2006	Catalina	CSS	·	1.0 km	MPC · JPL
465060	2006 SK_{41}	—	July 21, 2006	Mount Lemmon	Mount Lemmon Survey	NYS	1.0 km	MPC · JPL
465061	2006 SB_{61}	—	September 18, 2006	Catalina	CSS	·	1.3 km	MPC · JPL
465062	2006 SJ_{76}	—	September 19, 2006	Kitt Peak	Spacewatch	·	1.0 km	MPC · JPL
465063	2006 SM_{89}	—	July 21, 2006	Mount Lemmon	Mount Lemmon Survey	·	1.0 km	MPC · JPL
465064	2006 SY_{95}	—	September 18, 2006	Kitt Peak	Spacewatch	MAS	650 m	MPC · JPL
465065	2006 SF_{107}	—	September 19, 2006	Kitt Peak	Spacewatch	·	2.5 km	MPC · JPL
465066	2006 SC_{112}	—	September 22, 2006	Catalina	CSS	·	1.5 km	MPC · JPL
465067	2006 SU_{121}	—	September 19, 2006	Catalina	CSS	·	1.2 km	MPC · JPL
465068	2006 SR_{202}	—	September 17, 2006	Kitt Peak	Spacewatch	·	3.0 km	MPC · JPL
465069	2006 SE_{213}	—	September 19, 2006	Catalina	CSS	PHO	1.1 km	MPC · JPL
465070	2006 SV_{229}	—	September 18, 2006	Kitt Peak	Spacewatch	·	1.0 km	MPC · JPL
465071	2006 SJ_{246}	—	September 16, 2006	Kitt Peak	Spacewatch	VER	2.4 km	MPC · JPL
465072	2006 SR_{301}	—	September 26, 2006	Catalina	CSS	T_{j} (2.99)	6.0 km	MPC · JPL
465073	2006 ST_{346}	—	September 28, 2006	Kitt Peak	Spacewatch	·	890 m	MPC · JPL
465074	2006 SP_{356}	—	September 30, 2006	Catalina	CSS	·	1.2 km	MPC · JPL
465075	2006 SA_{357}	—	September 30, 2006	Catalina	CSS	NYS	1.3 km	MPC · JPL
465076	2006 SG_{365}	—	September 30, 2006	Catalina	CSS	·	1.1 km	MPC · JPL
465077	2006 SU_{367}	—	September 27, 2006	Catalina	CSS	T_{j} (2.99)	4.6 km	MPC · JPL
465078	2006 SX_{410}	—	December 19, 2003	Kitt Peak	Spacewatch	NYS	1.1 km	MPC · JPL
465079	2006 TX_{52}	—	October 12, 2006	Kitt Peak	Spacewatch	·	1.5 km	MPC · JPL
465080	2006 TT_{79}	—	October 13, 2006	Kitt Peak	Spacewatch	·	1.1 km	MPC · JPL
465081	2006 TY_{103}	—	October 15, 2006	Kitt Peak	Spacewatch	·	930 m	MPC · JPL
465082	2006 TE_{105}	—	October 15, 2006	Kitt Peak	Spacewatch	·	990 m	MPC · JPL
465083	2006 TH_{127}	—	October 4, 2006	Mount Lemmon	Mount Lemmon Survey	·	1.2 km	MPC · JPL
465084	2006 TW_{127}	—	October 12, 2006	Kitt Peak	Spacewatch	·	1.1 km	MPC · JPL
465085	2006 UD_{10}	—	September 30, 2006	Mount Lemmon	Mount Lemmon Survey	·	840 m	MPC · JPL
465086	2006 UH_{17}	—	October 16, 2006	Kitt Peak	Spacewatch	·	1.0 km	MPC · JPL
465087	2006 UU_{39}	—	September 28, 2006	Mount Lemmon	Mount Lemmon Survey	NYS	1 km	MPC · JPL
465088	2006 UC_{57}	—	October 18, 2006	Kitt Peak	Spacewatch	·	920 m	MPC · JPL
465089	2006 UF_{59}	—	October 19, 2006	Kitt Peak	Spacewatch	CYB	2.8 km	MPC · JPL
465090	2006 UZ_{71}	—	October 17, 2006	Kitt Peak	Spacewatch	V	590 m	MPC · JPL
465091	2006 UV_{81}	—	October 17, 2006	Mount Lemmon	Mount Lemmon Survey	·	1.0 km	MPC · JPL
465092	2006 UG_{89}	—	October 17, 2006	Kitt Peak	Spacewatch	·	1.2 km	MPC · JPL
465093	2006 UQ_{103}	—	September 30, 2006	Mount Lemmon	Mount Lemmon Survey	MAS	700 m	MPC · JPL
465094	2006 UM_{118}	—	October 19, 2006	Kitt Peak	Spacewatch	·	860 m	MPC · JPL
465095	2006 UB_{140}	—	October 19, 2006	Kitt Peak	Spacewatch	·	1.5 km	MPC · JPL
465096	2006 UT_{186}	—	September 22, 2006	Anderson Mesa	LONEOS	·	1.2 km	MPC · JPL
465097	2006 UE_{191}	—	August 28, 2006	Catalina	CSS	·	1.7 km	MPC · JPL
465098	2006 UQ_{217}	—	October 31, 2006	Catalina	CSS	T_{j} (2.87) · AMO +1km	2.1 km	MPC · JPL
465099	2006 UY_{236}	—	October 23, 2006	Kitt Peak	Spacewatch	PHO	710 m	MPC · JPL
465100	2006 UQ_{245}	—	October 27, 2006	Mount Lemmon	Mount Lemmon Survey	H	450 m	MPC · JPL

== 465101–465200 ==
back to top

Designation			Discovery			Properties		Ref
Permanent	Provisional	Named after	Date	Site	Discoverer(s)	Category	Diam.	Ref
465101	2006 UE_{252}	—	October 27, 2006	Mount Lemmon	Mount Lemmon Survey	·	1.1 km	MPC · JPL
465102	2006 UO_{273}	—	October 27, 2006	Kitt Peak	Spacewatch	·	1.0 km	MPC · JPL
465103	2006 UJ_{276}	—	September 19, 2006	Kitt Peak	Spacewatch	·	1.1 km	MPC · JPL
465104	2006 UM_{288}	—	October 29, 2006	Mount Lemmon	Mount Lemmon Survey	(5)	1.2 km	MPC · JPL
465105	2006 UD_{290}	—	October 31, 2006	Kitt Peak	Spacewatch	·	730 m	MPC · JPL
465106	2006 VF_{17}	—	October 21, 2006	Kitt Peak	Spacewatch	MAS	680 m	MPC · JPL
465107	2006 VQ_{18}	—	November 9, 2006	Kitt Peak	Spacewatch	·	1.3 km	MPC · JPL
465108	2006 VR_{26}	—	September 30, 2006	Mount Lemmon	Mount Lemmon Survey	(5)	960 m	MPC · JPL
465109	2006 VA_{31}	—	November 10, 2006	Kitt Peak	Spacewatch	MAR	970 m	MPC · JPL
465110	2006 VB_{34}	—	November 11, 2006	Catalina	CSS	H	640 m	MPC · JPL
465111	2006 VF_{61}	—	October 28, 2006	Mount Lemmon	Mount Lemmon Survey	·	830 m	MPC · JPL
465112	2006 VE_{65}	—	November 11, 2006	Kitt Peak	Spacewatch	·	720 m	MPC · JPL
465113	2006 VS_{70}	—	November 11, 2006	Kitt Peak	Spacewatch	·	1.1 km	MPC · JPL
465114	2006 VA_{108}	—	September 28, 2006	Mount Lemmon	Mount Lemmon Survey	·	1.2 km	MPC · JPL
465115	2006 WA_{83}	—	October 31, 2002	Socorro	LINEAR	·	1.3 km	MPC · JPL
465116	2006 WB_{100}	—	November 19, 2006	Catalina	CSS	·	1.3 km	MPC · JPL
465117	2006 WU_{104}	—	November 19, 2006	Kitt Peak	Spacewatch	·	750 m	MPC · JPL
465118	2006 WU_{107}	—	October 4, 2006	Mount Lemmon	Mount Lemmon Survey	·	1.1 km	MPC · JPL
465119	2006 WV_{110}	—	November 19, 2006	Kitt Peak	Spacewatch	·	1.2 km	MPC · JPL
465120	2006 WW_{117}	—	November 20, 2006	Mount Lemmon	Mount Lemmon Survey	(1547)	1.4 km	MPC · JPL
465121	2006 WP_{134}	—	November 18, 2006	Mount Lemmon	Mount Lemmon Survey	CYB	3.6 km	MPC · JPL
465122	2006 WL_{157}	—	November 22, 2006	Catalina	CSS	·	930 m	MPC · JPL
465123	2006 WL_{170}	—	November 23, 2006	Kitt Peak	Spacewatch	·	750 m	MPC · JPL
465124	2006 WW_{175}	—	November 23, 2006	Kitt Peak	Spacewatch	(5)	1.1 km	MPC · JPL
465125	2006 WY_{190}	—	November 25, 2006	Kitt Peak	Spacewatch	·	930 m	MPC · JPL
465126	2006 WF_{204}	—	November 23, 2006	Mount Lemmon	Mount Lemmon Survey	·	1.1 km	MPC · JPL
465127	2006 XB_{56}	—	November 28, 2006	Mount Lemmon	Mount Lemmon Survey	·	1.3 km	MPC · JPL
465128	2006 XY_{61}	—	December 15, 2006	Kitt Peak	Spacewatch	KON	2.0 km	MPC · JPL
465129	2006 XG_{66}	—	December 1, 2006	Mount Lemmon	Mount Lemmon Survey	·	1.1 km	MPC · JPL
465130	2006 XG_{67}	—	September 28, 2006	Mount Lemmon	Mount Lemmon Survey	·	1.5 km	MPC · JPL
465131	2006 YO_{9}	—	December 21, 2006	Kitt Peak	Spacewatch	BRG	1.6 km	MPC · JPL
465132	2006 YG_{15}	—	November 13, 2006	Kitt Peak	Spacewatch	·	1.2 km	MPC · JPL
465133	2006 YH_{17}	—	October 29, 2006	Mount Lemmon	Mount Lemmon Survey	·	1.5 km	MPC · JPL
465134	2006 YQ_{17}	—	November 1, 2006	Kitt Peak	Spacewatch	·	1.8 km	MPC · JPL
465135	2006 YV_{26}	—	November 27, 2006	Mount Lemmon	Mount Lemmon Survey	·	1.2 km	MPC · JPL
465136	2006 YF_{48}	—	December 24, 2006	Kitt Peak	Spacewatch	·	1.4 km	MPC · JPL
465137	2007 AK_{23}	—	December 21, 2006	Mount Lemmon	Mount Lemmon Survey	·	1.9 km	MPC · JPL
465138	2007 AB_{28}	—	December 27, 2006	Mount Lemmon	Mount Lemmon Survey	·	1.3 km	MPC · JPL
465139	2007 BD_{2}	—	January 8, 2007	Kitt Peak	Spacewatch	·	2.0 km	MPC · JPL
465140	2007 BA_{3}	—	November 27, 2006	Mount Lemmon	Mount Lemmon Survey	·	1 km	MPC · JPL
465141	2007 BH_{37}	—	January 24, 2007	Mount Lemmon	Mount Lemmon Survey	·	1.1 km	MPC · JPL
465142	2007 BG_{45}	—	January 25, 2007	Catalina	CSS	·	1.1 km	MPC · JPL
465143	2007 BC_{59}	—	November 27, 2006	Mount Lemmon	Mount Lemmon Survey	·	1.2 km	MPC · JPL
465144	2007 BK_{76}	—	January 9, 2007	Mount Lemmon	Mount Lemmon Survey	·	980 m	MPC · JPL
465145	2007 BE_{81}	—	January 27, 2007	Kitt Peak	Spacewatch	EUN	930 m	MPC · JPL
465146	2007 CZ_{2}	—	January 27, 2007	Kitt Peak	Spacewatch	·	1.1 km	MPC · JPL
465147	2007 CG_{8}	—	November 28, 2006	Mount Lemmon	Mount Lemmon Survey	·	1.1 km	MPC · JPL
465148	2007 CJ_{29}	—	February 6, 2007	Mount Lemmon	Mount Lemmon Survey	·	1.8 km	MPC · JPL
465149	2007 CG_{31}	—	January 10, 2007	Mount Lemmon	Mount Lemmon Survey	·	1.5 km	MPC · JPL
465150	2007 CW_{32}	—	January 27, 2007	Mount Lemmon	Mount Lemmon Survey	·	1.4 km	MPC · JPL
465151	2007 CL_{37}	—	February 6, 2007	Mount Lemmon	Mount Lemmon Survey	·	1.6 km	MPC · JPL
465152	2007 CD_{48}	—	February 10, 2007	Mount Lemmon	Mount Lemmon Survey	3:2	4.9 km	MPC · JPL
465153	2007 CT_{56}	—	January 27, 2007	Catalina	CSS	·	1.9 km	MPC · JPL
465154	2007 CR_{57}	—	February 9, 2007	Catalina	CSS	·	1.6 km	MPC · JPL
465155	2007 DC_{6}	—	February 17, 2007	Kitt Peak	Spacewatch	·	2.2 km	MPC · JPL
465156	2007 DU_{11}	—	January 17, 2007	Kitt Peak	Spacewatch	·	960 m	MPC · JPL
465157	2007 DW_{12}	—	November 24, 2006	Kitt Peak	Spacewatch	·	1.4 km	MPC · JPL
465158	2007 DP_{32}	—	February 17, 2007	Kitt Peak	Spacewatch	·	1.6 km	MPC · JPL
465159	2007 DO_{33}	—	February 17, 2007	Kitt Peak	Spacewatch	·	1.3 km	MPC · JPL
465160	2007 DW_{41}	—	February 10, 2007	Catalina	CSS	·	2.2 km	MPC · JPL
465161	2007 DX_{41}	—	February 16, 2007	Catalina	CSS	·	1.6 km	MPC · JPL
465162	2007 DM_{55}	—	February 21, 2007	Kitt Peak	Spacewatch	·	1.6 km	MPC · JPL
465163	2007 DY_{69}	—	February 21, 2007	Kitt Peak	Spacewatch	·	1.1 km	MPC · JPL
465164	2007 DZ_{113}	—	February 25, 2007	Anderson Mesa	LONEOS	·	2.1 km	MPC · JPL
465165	2007 DV_{115}	—	February 22, 2007	Kitt Peak	Spacewatch	NEM	1.6 km	MPC · JPL
465166	2007 EL	—	March 9, 2007	Kitt Peak	Spacewatch	AMO	440 m	MPC · JPL
465167	2007 EE_{14}	—	December 1, 2006	Mount Lemmon	Mount Lemmon Survey	·	1.5 km	MPC · JPL
465168	2007 EM_{16}	—	March 9, 2007	Catalina	CSS	·	1.9 km	MPC · JPL
465169	2007 EE_{43}	—	March 9, 2007	Kitt Peak	Spacewatch	·	2.0 km	MPC · JPL
465170	2007 EW_{52}	—	February 17, 2007	Kitt Peak	Spacewatch	·	1.4 km	MPC · JPL
465171	2007 EE_{53}	—	September 7, 2004	Kitt Peak	Spacewatch	·	2.7 km	MPC · JPL
465172	2007 EZ_{63}	—	January 17, 2007	Kitt Peak	Spacewatch	·	1.3 km	MPC · JPL
465173	2007 EY_{76}	—	March 10, 2007	Mount Lemmon	Mount Lemmon Survey	AEO	810 m	MPC · JPL
465174	2007 EE_{84}	—	March 12, 2007	Mount Lemmon	Mount Lemmon Survey	·	1.4 km	MPC · JPL
465175	2007 ER_{100}	—	February 21, 2007	Mount Lemmon	Mount Lemmon Survey	·	1.6 km	MPC · JPL
465176	2007 ES_{100}	—	February 23, 2007	Mount Lemmon	Mount Lemmon Survey	·	1.1 km	MPC · JPL
465177	2007 EZ_{121}	—	March 14, 2007	Mount Lemmon	Mount Lemmon Survey	·	1.2 km	MPC · JPL
465178	2007 EB_{127}	—	January 28, 2007	Mount Lemmon	Mount Lemmon Survey	·	1.4 km	MPC · JPL
465179	2007 EL_{127}	—	February 21, 2007	Kitt Peak	Spacewatch	·	1.1 km	MPC · JPL
465180	2007 EZ_{141}	—	March 12, 2007	Kitt Peak	Spacewatch	·	1.6 km	MPC · JPL
465181	2007 EB_{190}	—	February 23, 2007	Mount Lemmon	Mount Lemmon Survey	·	1.3 km	MPC · JPL
465182	2007 EV_{193}	—	March 14, 2007	Kitt Peak	Spacewatch	·	1.5 km	MPC · JPL
465183	2007 ER_{219}	—	March 10, 2007	Kitt Peak	Spacewatch	·	1.4 km	MPC · JPL
465184	2007 FG_{22}	—	March 20, 2007	Kitt Peak	Spacewatch	·	1.5 km	MPC · JPL
465185	2007 FR_{26}	—	September 24, 1995	Kitt Peak	Spacewatch	·	1.6 km	MPC · JPL
465186	2007 FB_{46}	—	March 26, 2007	Mount Lemmon	Mount Lemmon Survey	·	1.5 km	MPC · JPL
465187	2007 GS_{9}	—	March 17, 2007	Kitt Peak	Spacewatch	EUN	1.4 km	MPC · JPL
465188	2007 GD_{43}	—	March 26, 2007	Kitt Peak	Spacewatch	GEF	1.2 km	MPC · JPL
465189	2007 GE_{67}	—	April 15, 2007	Kitt Peak	Spacewatch	DOR	2.0 km	MPC · JPL
465190	2007 GE_{71}	—	March 26, 2007	Kitt Peak	Spacewatch	·	1.4 km	MPC · JPL
465191	2007 HQ_{1}	—	April 16, 2007	Socorro	LINEAR	·	1.6 km	MPC · JPL
465192	2007 HF_{20}	—	April 18, 2007	Kitt Peak	Spacewatch	·	1.8 km	MPC · JPL
465193	2007 HP_{24}	—	April 18, 2007	Kitt Peak	Spacewatch	AGN	1.3 km	MPC · JPL
465194	2007 HS_{41}	—	April 11, 2007	Kitt Peak	Spacewatch	DOR	2.4 km	MPC · JPL
465195	2007 HC_{42}	—	March 16, 2007	Kitt Peak	Spacewatch	·	2.2 km	MPC · JPL
465196	2007 HB_{43}	—	April 16, 2007	Catalina	CSS	·	2.2 km	MPC · JPL
465197	2007 HW_{50}	—	April 20, 2007	Kitt Peak	Spacewatch	·	1.8 km	MPC · JPL
465198	2007 HM_{57}	—	April 22, 2007	Mount Lemmon	Mount Lemmon Survey	·	2.1 km	MPC · JPL
465199	2007 JJ_{8}	—	May 9, 2007	Mount Lemmon	Mount Lemmon Survey	·	1.9 km	MPC · JPL
465200	2007 JB_{28}	—	May 10, 2007	Kitt Peak	Spacewatch	·	2.1 km	MPC · JPL

== 465201–465300 ==
back to top

Designation			Discovery			Properties		Ref
Permanent	Provisional	Named after	Date	Site	Discoverer(s)	Category	Diam.	Ref
465201	2007 JA_{30}	—	March 13, 2007	Mount Lemmon	Mount Lemmon Survey	·	1.7 km	MPC · JPL
465202	2007 JB_{31}	—	May 12, 2007	Kitt Peak	Spacewatch	·	2.3 km	MPC · JPL
465203	2007 LC_{21}	—	April 25, 2007	Kitt Peak	Spacewatch	·	2.0 km	MPC · JPL
465204	2007 LJ_{24}	—	June 14, 2007	Kitt Peak	Spacewatch	·	1.8 km	MPC · JPL
465205	2007 MY_{21}	—	June 22, 2007	Kitt Peak	Spacewatch	·	2.4 km	MPC · JPL
465206	2007 OR_{4}	—	July 21, 2007	Lulin	LUSS	·	620 m	MPC · JPL
465207	2007 PC_{21}	—	August 9, 2007	Socorro	LINEAR	·	740 m	MPC · JPL
465208	2007 PS_{28}	—	August 15, 2007	Pla D'Arguines	R. Ferrando	·	3.7 km	MPC · JPL
465209	2007 PN_{30}	—	August 11, 2007	Socorro	LINEAR	·	750 m	MPC · JPL
465210	2007 QF_{10}	—	August 23, 2007	Kitt Peak	Spacewatch	·	500 m	MPC · JPL
465211	2007 RW_{5}	—	September 5, 2007	Dauban	Chante-Perdrix	·	570 m	MPC · JPL
465212	2007 RG_{6}	—	September 5, 2007	Dauban	Chante-Perdrix	·	2.5 km	MPC · JPL
465213	2007 RS_{15}	—	September 11, 2007	Purple Mountain	PMO NEO Survey Program	H	390 m	MPC · JPL
465214	2007 RU_{29}	—	September 4, 2007	Catalina	CSS	·	820 m	MPC · JPL
465215	2007 RB_{31}	—	September 5, 2007	Catalina	CSS	·	870 m	MPC · JPL
465216	2007 RR_{54}	—	September 9, 2007	Kitt Peak	Spacewatch	·	3.0 km	MPC · JPL
465217	2007 RL_{68}	—	September 10, 2007	Kitt Peak	Spacewatch	·	1.6 km	MPC · JPL
465218	2007 RA_{86}	—	August 23, 2007	Kitt Peak	Spacewatch	EOS	1.7 km	MPC · JPL
465219	2007 RX_{92}	—	September 10, 2007	Mount Lemmon	Mount Lemmon Survey	THM	2.4 km	MPC · JPL
465220	2007 RZ_{107}	—	September 11, 2007	Kitt Peak	Spacewatch	(2076)	630 m	MPC · JPL
465221	2007 RL_{115}	—	September 11, 2007	Kitt Peak	Spacewatch	·	740 m	MPC · JPL
465222	2007 RB_{118}	—	September 11, 2007	Kitt Peak	Spacewatch	·	960 m	MPC · JPL
465223	2007 RF_{129}	—	September 12, 2007	Mount Lemmon	Mount Lemmon Survey	·	2.2 km	MPC · JPL
465224	2007 RT_{131}	—	September 12, 2007	Mount Lemmon	Mount Lemmon Survey	·	1.7 km	MPC · JPL
465225	2007 RC_{139}	—	September 15, 2007	Bergisch Gladbach	W. Bickel	·	2.9 km	MPC · JPL
465226	2007 RH_{139}	—	September 3, 2007	Catalina	CSS	·	650 m	MPC · JPL
465227	2007 RZ_{165}	—	September 10, 2007	Kitt Peak	Spacewatch	·	2.7 km	MPC · JPL
465228	2007 RO_{179}	—	September 10, 2007	Mount Lemmon	Mount Lemmon Survey	·	750 m	MPC · JPL
465229	2007 RN_{181}	—	September 11, 2007	Mount Lemmon	Mount Lemmon Survey	·	2.6 km	MPC · JPL
465230	2007 RQ_{191}	—	September 11, 2007	Kitt Peak	Spacewatch	EOS	1.6 km	MPC · JPL
465231	2007 RQ_{209}	—	September 10, 2007	Kitt Peak	Spacewatch	·	700 m	MPC · JPL
465232	2007 RR_{210}	—	August 23, 2007	Kitt Peak	Spacewatch	·	2.5 km	MPC · JPL
465233	2007 RG_{228}	—	September 6, 2007	Anderson Mesa	LONEOS	·	640 m	MPC · JPL
465234	2007 RY_{250}	—	September 13, 2007	Kitt Peak	Spacewatch	·	700 m	MPC · JPL
465235	2007 RG_{262}	—	September 5, 2007	Anderson Mesa	LONEOS	·	3.7 km	MPC · JPL
465236	2007 RC_{272}	—	September 15, 2007	Kitt Peak	Spacewatch	·	2.9 km	MPC · JPL
465237	2007 RJ_{273}	—	September 9, 2007	Kitt Peak	Spacewatch	·	2.6 km	MPC · JPL
465238	2007 RM_{287}	—	September 9, 2007	Mount Lemmon	Mount Lemmon Survey	·	620 m	MPC · JPL
465239	2007 RT_{290}	—	September 11, 2007	Kitt Peak	Spacewatch	·	3.0 km	MPC · JPL
465240	2007 RK_{291}	—	September 9, 2007	Kitt Peak	Spacewatch	·	2.7 km	MPC · JPL
465241	2007 RS_{291}	—	September 12, 2007	Mount Lemmon	Mount Lemmon Survey	·	2.7 km	MPC · JPL
465242	2007 RT_{291}	—	September 12, 2007	Mount Lemmon	Mount Lemmon Survey	EOS	1.9 km	MPC · JPL
465243	2007 RR_{293}	—	September 13, 2007	Mount Lemmon	Mount Lemmon Survey	THM	2.0 km	MPC · JPL
465244	2007 RU_{293}	—	September 13, 2007	Mount Lemmon	Mount Lemmon Survey	·	2.4 km	MPC · JPL
465245	2007 RX_{293}	—	September 13, 2007	Mount Lemmon	Mount Lemmon Survey	·	1.9 km	MPC · JPL
465246	2007 RE_{298}	—	March 8, 2005	Mount Lemmon	Mount Lemmon Survey	·	3.5 km	MPC · JPL
465247	2007 RF_{301}	—	September 12, 2007	Mount Lemmon	Mount Lemmon Survey	VER	2.5 km	MPC · JPL
465248	2007 RW_{302}	—	September 12, 2007	Mount Lemmon	Mount Lemmon Survey	·	900 m	MPC · JPL
465249	2007 RH_{312}	—	September 12, 2007	Catalina	CSS	·	3.4 km	MPC · JPL
465250	2007 RT_{315}	—	September 12, 2007	Mount Lemmon	Mount Lemmon Survey	·	800 m	MPC · JPL
465251	2007 RP_{316}	—	September 9, 2007	Kitt Peak	Spacewatch	·	620 m	MPC · JPL
465252	2007 RW_{319}	—	September 13, 2007	Catalina	CSS	·	750 m	MPC · JPL
465253	2007 RZ_{322}	—	September 14, 2007	Mount Lemmon	Mount Lemmon Survey	·	2.5 km	MPC · JPL
465254	2007 SM_{2}	—	September 20, 2007	Dauban	C. Rinner, F. Kugel	·	2.5 km	MPC · JPL
465255	2007 SD_{6}	—	September 21, 2007	Socorro	LINEAR	·	630 m	MPC · JPL
465256	2007 SJ_{6}	—	September 4, 2007	Catalina	CSS	·	630 m	MPC · JPL
465257	2007 SQ_{14}	—	September 8, 2007	Mount Lemmon	Mount Lemmon Survey	·	3.0 km	MPC · JPL
465258	2007 SP_{19}	—	September 24, 2007	Kitt Peak	Spacewatch	·	2.5 km	MPC · JPL
465259	2007 SS_{22}	—	September 19, 2007	Kitt Peak	Spacewatch	·	2.4 km	MPC · JPL
465260	2007 TS_{11}	—	September 14, 2007	Mount Lemmon	Mount Lemmon Survey	·	2.7 km	MPC · JPL
465261	2007 TK_{26}	—	October 4, 2007	Mount Lemmon	Mount Lemmon Survey	·	4.3 km	MPC · JPL
465262	2007 TK_{27}	—	September 14, 2007	Mount Lemmon	Mount Lemmon Survey	·	2.9 km	MPC · JPL
465263	2007 TS_{27}	—	September 12, 2007	Mount Lemmon	Mount Lemmon Survey	·	2.6 km	MPC · JPL
465264	2007 TN_{39}	—	October 6, 2007	Kitt Peak	Spacewatch	·	2.3 km	MPC · JPL
465265	2007 TL_{59}	—	July 18, 2007	Mount Lemmon	Mount Lemmon Survey	·	650 m	MPC · JPL
465266	2007 TK_{60}	—	August 23, 2007	Kitt Peak	Spacewatch	·	2.0 km	MPC · JPL
465267	2007 TQ_{61}	—	October 7, 2007	Mount Lemmon	Mount Lemmon Survey	·	2.4 km	MPC · JPL
465268	2007 TU_{72}	—	October 8, 2007	Catalina	CSS	H	410 m	MPC · JPL
465269	2007 TA_{74}	—	October 12, 2007	Socorro	LINEAR	·	2.7 km	MPC · JPL
465270	2007 TQ_{74}	—	October 7, 2007	Catalina	CSS	(2076)	640 m	MPC · JPL
465271	2007 TF_{107}	—	September 13, 2007	Mount Lemmon	Mount Lemmon Survey	·	950 m	MPC · JPL
465272	2007 TS_{112}	—	October 8, 2007	Mount Lemmon	Mount Lemmon Survey	·	630 m	MPC · JPL
465273	2007 TR_{115}	—	October 8, 2007	Mount Lemmon	Mount Lemmon Survey	·	3.3 km	MPC · JPL
465274	2007 TR_{127}	—	October 6, 2007	Kitt Peak	Spacewatch	·	690 m	MPC · JPL
465275	2007 TR_{163}	—	October 11, 2007	Socorro	LINEAR	·	670 m	MPC · JPL
465276	2007 TA_{165}	—	September 12, 2007	Mount Lemmon	Mount Lemmon Survey	·	700 m	MPC · JPL
465277	2007 TV_{172}	—	October 13, 2007	La Sagra	OAM	·	2.0 km	MPC · JPL
465278	2007 TV_{178}	—	October 7, 2007	Kitt Peak	Spacewatch	EOS	2.1 km	MPC · JPL
465279	2007 TY_{180}	—	October 8, 2007	Anderson Mesa	LONEOS	·	750 m	MPC · JPL
465280	2007 TA_{182}	—	October 8, 2007	Catalina	CSS	·	750 m	MPC · JPL
465281	2007 TM_{190}	—	September 12, 2007	Mount Lemmon	Mount Lemmon Survey	·	1.8 km	MPC · JPL
465282	2007 TK_{205}	—	October 8, 2007	Mount Lemmon	Mount Lemmon Survey	·	3.0 km	MPC · JPL
465283	2007 TZ_{211}	—	October 7, 2007	Kitt Peak	Spacewatch	·	670 m	MPC · JPL
465284	2007 TA_{219}	—	October 8, 2007	Mount Lemmon	Mount Lemmon Survey	L4	7.3 km	MPC · JPL
465285	2007 TN_{244}	—	October 8, 2007	Catalina	CSS	·	810 m	MPC · JPL
465286	2007 TO_{248}	—	October 10, 2007	Kitt Peak	Spacewatch	·	630 m	MPC · JPL
465287	2007 TD_{260}	—	October 10, 2007	Mount Lemmon	Mount Lemmon Survey	·	2.5 km	MPC · JPL
465288	2007 TM_{276}	—	October 11, 2007	Mount Lemmon	Mount Lemmon Survey	·	550 m	MPC · JPL
465289	2007 TB_{295}	—	October 10, 2007	Mount Lemmon	Mount Lemmon Survey	·	1.7 km	MPC · JPL
465290	2007 TK_{299}	—	October 4, 2007	Kitt Peak	Spacewatch	·	3.2 km	MPC · JPL
465291	2007 TC_{314}	—	October 11, 2007	Mount Lemmon	Mount Lemmon Survey	·	2.9 km	MPC · JPL
465292	2007 TD_{329}	—	October 11, 2007	Kitt Peak	Spacewatch	·	830 m	MPC · JPL
465293	2007 TR_{330}	—	October 11, 2007	Kitt Peak	Spacewatch	T_{j} (2.93) · CYB	4.0 km	MPC · JPL
465294	2007 TY_{335}	—	September 30, 2007	Kitt Peak	Spacewatch	·	2.6 km	MPC · JPL
465295	2007 TH_{336}	—	September 30, 2007	Kitt Peak	Spacewatch	V	470 m	MPC · JPL
465296	2007 TE_{359}	—	September 21, 2007	XuYi	PMO NEO Survey Program	·	1.1 km	MPC · JPL
465297	2007 TN_{368}	—	September 8, 2007	Anderson Mesa	LONEOS	·	2.5 km	MPC · JPL
465298	2007 TF_{385}	—	September 12, 2007	Mount Lemmon	Mount Lemmon Survey	·	2.9 km	MPC · JPL
465299	2007 TW_{394}	—	September 12, 2007	Catalina	CSS	·	4.1 km	MPC · JPL
465300	2007 TE_{397}	—	September 5, 2007	Mount Lemmon	Mount Lemmon Survey	·	2.5 km	MPC · JPL

== 465301–465400 ==
back to top

Designation			Discovery			Properties		Ref
Permanent	Provisional	Named after	Date	Site	Discoverer(s)	Category	Diam.	Ref
465301	2007 TX_{407}	—	October 15, 2007	Mount Lemmon	Mount Lemmon Survey	EOS	2.5 km	MPC · JPL
465302	2007 TA_{424}	—	September 12, 2007	Mount Lemmon	Mount Lemmon Survey	·	3.0 km	MPC · JPL
465303	2007 TR_{425}	—	October 8, 2007	Mount Lemmon	Mount Lemmon Survey	CYB	4.5 km	MPC · JPL
465304	2007 TK_{428}	—	October 10, 2007	Kitt Peak	Spacewatch	·	710 m	MPC · JPL
465305	2007 TB_{432}	—	October 4, 2007	Kitt Peak	Spacewatch	·	3.0 km	MPC · JPL
465306	2007 TK_{448}	—	October 8, 2007	Kitt Peak	Spacewatch	·	2.6 km	MPC · JPL
465307	2007 UQ_{3}	—	October 19, 2007	Catalina	CSS	·	710 m	MPC · JPL
465308	2007 UX_{4}	—	October 17, 2007	Dauban	C. Rinner, F. Kugel	·	3.3 km	MPC · JPL
465309	2007 UJ_{10}	—	October 5, 2007	Kitt Peak	Spacewatch	·	970 m	MPC · JPL
465310	2007 UX_{12}	—	October 16, 2007	Kitt Peak	Spacewatch	·	520 m	MPC · JPL
465311	2007 UD_{26}	—	October 16, 2007	Kitt Peak	Spacewatch	·	800 m	MPC · JPL
465312	2007 UJ_{26}	—	October 18, 2007	Kitt Peak	Spacewatch	·	2.7 km	MPC · JPL
465313	2007 UN_{43}	—	October 18, 2007	Kitt Peak	Spacewatch	·	2.5 km	MPC · JPL
465314	2007 UQ_{59}	—	October 30, 2007	Mount Lemmon	Mount Lemmon Survey	THM	2.4 km	MPC · JPL
465315	2007 UJ_{71}	—	September 15, 2007	Mount Lemmon	Mount Lemmon Survey	V	410 m	MPC · JPL
465316	2007 UB_{73}	—	October 7, 2007	Mount Lemmon	Mount Lemmon Survey	·	860 m	MPC · JPL
465317	2007 UY_{137}	—	October 18, 2007	Kitt Peak	Spacewatch	·	640 m	MPC · JPL
465318	2007 UT_{139}	—	October 24, 2007	Mount Lemmon	Mount Lemmon Survey	·	960 m	MPC · JPL
465319	2007 UW_{139}	—	October 30, 2007	Catalina	CSS	·	710 m	MPC · JPL
465320	2007 UK_{140}	—	October 16, 2007	Mount Lemmon	Mount Lemmon Survey	·	670 m	MPC · JPL
465321	2007 UO_{140}	—	October 18, 2007	Mount Lemmon	Mount Lemmon Survey	·	630 m	MPC · JPL
465322	2007 VH_{5}	—	September 9, 2007	Mount Lemmon	Mount Lemmon Survey	·	700 m	MPC · JPL
465323	2007 VX_{19}	—	November 1, 2007	Kitt Peak	Spacewatch	PHO	780 m	MPC · JPL
465324	2007 VN_{30}	—	December 14, 2000	Bohyunsan	Y.-B. Jeon, B.-C. Lee	·	1.0 km	MPC · JPL
465325	2007 VY_{32}	—	October 15, 2007	Kitt Peak	Spacewatch	CYB	2.6 km	MPC · JPL
465326	2007 VA_{44}	—	October 16, 2007	Catalina	CSS	·	780 m	MPC · JPL
465327	2007 VP_{45}	—	October 9, 2007	Kitt Peak	Spacewatch	VER	2.5 km	MPC · JPL
465328	2007 VE_{51}	—	November 1, 2007	Kitt Peak	Spacewatch	·	950 m	MPC · JPL
465329	2007 VE_{58}	—	November 1, 2007	Kitt Peak	Spacewatch	·	760 m	MPC · JPL
465330	2007 VW_{65}	—	September 13, 2007	Mount Lemmon	Mount Lemmon Survey	·	3.1 km	MPC · JPL
465331	2007 VY_{75}	—	October 10, 2007	Mount Lemmon	Mount Lemmon Survey	·	670 m	MPC · JPL
465332	2007 VW_{88}	—	October 21, 2007	Catalina	CSS	PHO	850 m	MPC · JPL
465333	2007 VT_{103}	—	November 3, 2007	Kitt Peak	Spacewatch	EOS	1.7 km	MPC · JPL
465334	2007 VA_{123}	—	November 5, 2007	Mount Lemmon	Mount Lemmon Survey	V	540 m	MPC · JPL
465335	2007 VL_{128}	—	October 4, 2007	Kitt Peak	Spacewatch	·	830 m	MPC · JPL
465336	2007 VG_{133}	—	November 2, 2007	Mount Lemmon	Mount Lemmon Survey	·	2.5 km	MPC · JPL
465337	2007 VW_{138}	—	October 12, 2007	Mount Lemmon	Mount Lemmon Survey	·	840 m	MPC · JPL
465338	2007 VL_{141}	—	November 4, 2007	Kitt Peak	Spacewatch	ERI	1.0 km	MPC · JPL
465339	2007 VC_{167}	—	November 5, 2007	Mount Lemmon	Mount Lemmon Survey	·	830 m	MPC · JPL
465340	2007 VH_{174}	—	September 20, 2007	Catalina	CSS	·	1.0 km	MPC · JPL
465341	2007 VX_{174}	—	October 12, 2007	Kitt Peak	Spacewatch	·	2.5 km	MPC · JPL
465342	2007 VF_{205}	—	November 9, 2007	Mount Lemmon	Mount Lemmon Survey	·	550 m	MPC · JPL
465343	2007 VM_{222}	—	September 25, 2007	Mount Lemmon	Mount Lemmon Survey	·	730 m	MPC · JPL
465344	2007 VM_{239}	—	November 13, 2007	Kitt Peak	Spacewatch	·	3.0 km	MPC · JPL
465345	2007 VL_{283}	—	November 14, 2007	Kitt Peak	Spacewatch	·	810 m	MPC · JPL
465346	2007 VB_{296}	—	October 20, 2007	Mount Lemmon	Mount Lemmon Survey	CYB	3.0 km	MPC · JPL
465347	2007 VE_{314}	—	November 2, 2007	Kitt Peak	Spacewatch	·	930 m	MPC · JPL
465348	2007 WC_{6}	—	November 2, 2007	Kitt Peak	Spacewatch	·	930 m	MPC · JPL
465349	2007 WB_{13}	—	November 8, 2007	Socorro	LINEAR	·	1.3 km	MPC · JPL
465350	2007 WH_{28}	—	November 7, 2007	Kitt Peak	Spacewatch	·	960 m	MPC · JPL
465351	2007 XJ_{1}	—	December 3, 2007	Junk Bond	D. Healy	·	690 m	MPC · JPL
465352	2007 XC_{53}	—	December 5, 2007	Mount Lemmon	Mount Lemmon Survey	·	750 m	MPC · JPL
465353	2007 YX_{65}	—	December 30, 2007	Kitt Peak	Spacewatch	MAS	660 m	MPC · JPL
465354	2008 AV_{9}	—	June 3, 2005	Siding Spring	SSS	·	1.3 km	MPC · JPL
465355	2008 AL_{17}	—	January 10, 2008	Kitt Peak	Spacewatch	MAS	620 m	MPC · JPL
465356	2008 AB_{36}	—	December 31, 2007	Kitt Peak	Spacewatch	·	1.2 km	MPC · JPL
465357	2008 AP_{37}	—	December 30, 2007	Kitt Peak	Spacewatch	NYS	840 m	MPC · JPL
465358	2008 AA_{64}	—	January 11, 2008	Kitt Peak	Spacewatch	·	1.1 km	MPC · JPL
465359	2008 AP_{67}	—	December 30, 2007	Kitt Peak	Spacewatch	·	1.5 km	MPC · JPL
465360	2008 AE_{82}	—	November 20, 2007	Mount Lemmon	Mount Lemmon Survey	·	980 m	MPC · JPL
465361	2008 AZ_{94}	—	December 30, 2007	Kitt Peak	Spacewatch	NYS	1.0 km	MPC · JPL
465362	2008 AN_{105}	—	December 31, 2007	Kitt Peak	Spacewatch	·	1.0 km	MPC · JPL
465363	2008 AL_{136}	—	January 12, 2008	Mount Lemmon	Mount Lemmon Survey	PHO	1.1 km	MPC · JPL
465364	2008 BQ_{9}	—	January 16, 2008	Kitt Peak	Spacewatch	·	910 m	MPC · JPL
465365	2008 BD_{24}	—	January 31, 2008	La Sagra	OAM	H	370 m	MPC · JPL
465366	2008 CJ_{14}	—	February 3, 2008	Kitt Peak	Spacewatch	NYS	1.5 km	MPC · JPL
465367	2008 CW_{20}	—	February 7, 2008	Socorro	LINEAR	H	450 m	MPC · JPL
465368	2008 CG_{32}	—	February 2, 2008	Kitt Peak	Spacewatch	·	950 m	MPC · JPL
465369	2008 CO_{32}	—	February 2, 2008	Kitt Peak	Spacewatch	·	1.4 km	MPC · JPL
465370	2008 CZ_{60}	—	February 7, 2008	Mount Lemmon	Mount Lemmon Survey	3:2	4.9 km	MPC · JPL
465371	2008 CQ_{125}	—	February 8, 2008	Kitt Peak	Spacewatch	·	750 m	MPC · JPL
465372	2008 CX_{162}	—	February 10, 2008	Kitt Peak	Spacewatch	·	1 km	MPC · JPL
465373	2008 DJ_{17}	—	February 10, 2008	Kitt Peak	Spacewatch	H	480 m	MPC · JPL
465374	2008 DC_{20}	—	February 12, 2008	Kitt Peak	Spacewatch	·	730 m	MPC · JPL
465375	2008 DA_{43}	—	May 20, 2005	Mount Lemmon	Mount Lemmon Survey	·	1.5 km	MPC · JPL
465376	2008 DS_{63}	—	February 12, 2004	Kitt Peak	Spacewatch	·	900 m	MPC · JPL
465377	2008 DF_{86}	—	February 28, 2008	Mount Lemmon	Mount Lemmon Survey	·	860 m	MPC · JPL
465378	2008 EU_{37}	—	January 30, 2008	Mount Lemmon	Mount Lemmon Survey	·	910 m	MPC · JPL
465379	2008 EN_{127}	—	March 10, 2008	Mount Lemmon	Mount Lemmon Survey	H	570 m	MPC · JPL
465380	2008 EH_{146}	—	February 28, 2008	Mount Lemmon	Mount Lemmon Survey	·	1.3 km	MPC · JPL
465381	2008 EW_{153}	—	March 13, 2008	Kitt Peak	Spacewatch	·	1.3 km	MPC · JPL
465382	2008 ED_{163}	—	March 9, 2008	Kitt Peak	Spacewatch	·	940 m	MPC · JPL
465383	2008 EE_{168}	—	March 10, 2008	Catalina	CSS	·	1.5 km	MPC · JPL
465384	2008 FB_{15}	—	March 26, 2008	Kitt Peak	Spacewatch	EUN	940 m	MPC · JPL
465385	2008 FR_{23}	—	March 27, 2008	Kitt Peak	Spacewatch	·	1.4 km	MPC · JPL
465386	2008 FA_{30}	—	March 28, 2008	Kitt Peak	Spacewatch	3:2	4.8 km	MPC · JPL
465387	2008 FD_{31}	—	February 24, 2008	Kitt Peak	Spacewatch	·	930 m	MPC · JPL
465388	2008 FC_{40}	—	March 5, 2008	Mount Lemmon	Mount Lemmon Survey	·	1.1 km	MPC · JPL
465389	2008 FH_{53}	—	March 28, 2008	Mount Lemmon	Mount Lemmon Survey	H	540 m	MPC · JPL
465390	2008 FZ_{98}	—	March 30, 2008	Kitt Peak	Spacewatch	·	1.3 km	MPC · JPL
465391	2008 FL_{136}	—	March 28, 2008	Kitt Peak	Spacewatch	·	1.1 km	MPC · JPL
465392	2008 GS_{10}	—	April 1, 2008	Kitt Peak	Spacewatch	·	1.2 km	MPC · JPL
465393	2008 GV_{25}	—	April 1, 2008	Mount Lemmon	Mount Lemmon Survey	·	860 m	MPC · JPL
465394	2008 GR_{26}	—	March 12, 2008	Catalina	CSS	H	530 m	MPC · JPL
465395	2008 GX_{40}	—	April 4, 2008	Kitt Peak	Spacewatch	BRG	1.1 km	MPC · JPL
465396	2008 GA_{46}	—	April 4, 2008	Kitt Peak	Spacewatch	MAR	970 m	MPC · JPL
465397	2008 GH_{64}	—	April 5, 2008	Kitt Peak	Spacewatch	·	1.0 km	MPC · JPL
465398	2008 GF_{72}	—	April 7, 2008	Mount Lemmon	Mount Lemmon Survey	·	920 m	MPC · JPL
465399	2008 GD_{75}	—	March 30, 2008	Kitt Peak	Spacewatch	·	1.1 km	MPC · JPL
465400	2008 GM_{108}	—	March 2, 2008	Mount Lemmon	Mount Lemmon Survey	·	2.0 km	MPC · JPL

== 465401–465500 ==
back to top

Designation			Discovery			Properties		Ref
Permanent	Provisional	Named after	Date	Site	Discoverer(s)	Category	Diam.	Ref
465401	2008 GS_{110}	—	April 3, 2008	Catalina	CSS	H	520 m	MPC · JPL
465402	2008 HW_{1}	—	March 30, 2008	Catalina	CSS	T_{j} (2.4) · APO +1km	1.2 km	MPC · JPL
465403	2008 HK_{19}	—	April 9, 2008	Kitt Peak	Spacewatch	·	1.2 km	MPC · JPL
465404	2008 HQ_{46}	—	April 28, 2008	Kitt Peak	Spacewatch	·	1.1 km	MPC · JPL
465405	2008 HZ_{46}	—	April 24, 2008	Kitt Peak	Spacewatch	·	1.2 km	MPC · JPL
465406	2008 HR_{67}	—	April 30, 2008	Mount Lemmon	Mount Lemmon Survey	·	850 m	MPC · JPL
465407	2008 JG_{5}	—	February 18, 2008	Mount Lemmon	Mount Lemmon Survey	·	1.7 km	MPC · JPL
465408	2008 JM_{10}	—	May 3, 2008	Mount Lemmon	Mount Lemmon Survey	·	960 m	MPC · JPL
465409	2008 JM_{11}	—	April 29, 2008	Kitt Peak	Spacewatch	·	790 m	MPC · JPL
465410	2008 JN_{40}	—	May 13, 2008	Mount Lemmon	Mount Lemmon Survey	KON	2.0 km	MPC · JPL
465411	2008 KP_{1}	—	May 14, 2008	Mount Lemmon	Mount Lemmon Survey	·	1.1 km	MPC · JPL
465412	2008 KC_{3}	—	May 14, 2008	Mount Lemmon	Mount Lemmon Survey	·	1.1 km	MPC · JPL
465413	2008 KK_{3}	—	May 27, 2008	Kitt Peak	Spacewatch	·	1.4 km	MPC · JPL
465414	2008 KM_{15}	—	May 14, 2008	Kitt Peak	Spacewatch	·	1.1 km	MPC · JPL
465415	2008 KK_{18}	—	April 16, 2008	Mount Lemmon	Mount Lemmon Survey	·	1.2 km	MPC · JPL
465416	2008 KC_{36}	—	May 28, 2008	Mount Lemmon	Mount Lemmon Survey	EUN	1.1 km	MPC · JPL
465417	2008 KR_{41}	—	May 2, 2008	Kitt Peak	Spacewatch	·	1.8 km	MPC · JPL
465418	2008 MZ_{1}	—	June 24, 2008	Kitt Peak	Spacewatch	·	1.1 km	MPC · JPL
465419	2008 OW_{3}	—	July 25, 2008	Siding Spring	SSS	·	1.4 km	MPC · JPL
465420	2008 OQ_{20}	—	July 29, 2008	Kitt Peak	Spacewatch	·	1.1 km	MPC · JPL
465421	2008 PF	—	August 1, 2008	Črni Vrh	J. Vales, H. Mikuž	·	1.6 km	MPC · JPL
465422	2008 PL_{2}	—	August 2, 2008	La Sagra	OAM	H	490 m	MPC · JPL
465423	2008 PA_{4}	—	July 30, 2008	Kitt Peak	Spacewatch	EUN	1.3 km	MPC · JPL
465424	2008 PW_{6}	—	July 28, 2008	Mount Lemmon	Mount Lemmon Survey	EUN	1.3 km	MPC · JPL
465425	2008 PK_{15}	—	July 29, 2008	Mount Lemmon	Mount Lemmon Survey	·	1.3 km	MPC · JPL
465426	2008 PM_{21}	—	August 6, 2008	Siding Spring	SSS	·	1.7 km	MPC · JPL
465427	2008 QT_{21}	—	August 26, 2008	Socorro	LINEAR	·	2.1 km	MPC · JPL
465428	2008 QY_{43}	—	August 23, 2008	Siding Spring	SSS	JUN	1.4 km	MPC · JPL
465429	2008 QX_{44}	—	August 24, 2008	Socorro	LINEAR	·	2.0 km	MPC · JPL
465430	2008 RR_{5}	—	March 9, 2005	Mount Lemmon	Mount Lemmon Survey	·	2.2 km	MPC · JPL
465431	2008 RF_{35}	—	September 2, 2008	Kitt Peak	Spacewatch	·	2.8 km	MPC · JPL
465432	2008 RX_{38}	—	September 2, 2008	Kitt Peak	Spacewatch	·	1.9 km	MPC · JPL
465433	2008 RE_{62}	—	September 4, 2008	Kitt Peak	Spacewatch	KOR	1.2 km	MPC · JPL
465434	2008 RQ_{63}	—	September 4, 2008	Kitt Peak	Spacewatch	·	1.8 km	MPC · JPL
465435	2008 RL_{69}	—	September 4, 2008	Kitt Peak	Spacewatch	·	2.0 km	MPC · JPL
465436	2008 RL_{88}	—	September 5, 2008	Kitt Peak	Spacewatch	·	2.6 km	MPC · JPL
465437	2008 RT_{100}	—	September 4, 2008	Kitt Peak	Spacewatch	·	2.1 km	MPC · JPL
465438	2008 RZ_{105}	—	September 6, 2008	Mount Lemmon	Mount Lemmon Survey	·	1.9 km	MPC · JPL
465439	2008 RG_{107}	—	September 7, 2008	Mount Lemmon	Mount Lemmon Survey	·	3.0 km	MPC · JPL
465440	2008 RW_{112}	—	September 5, 2008	Kitt Peak	Spacewatch	·	1.7 km	MPC · JPL
465441	2008 RK_{116}	—	September 7, 2008	Mount Lemmon	Mount Lemmon Survey	·	1.9 km	MPC · JPL
465442	2008 RH_{123}	—	September 6, 2008	Kitt Peak	Spacewatch	KOR	1.1 km	MPC · JPL
465443	2008 RS_{134}	—	September 6, 2008	La Sagra	OAM	JUN	1.0 km	MPC · JPL
465444	2008 RU_{134}	—	September 8, 2008	Siding Spring	SSS	·	2.6 km	MPC · JPL
465445	2008 RS_{138}	—	September 6, 2008	Mount Lemmon	Mount Lemmon Survey	·	3.5 km	MPC · JPL
465446	2008 SE_{20}	—	September 9, 2008	Mount Lemmon	Mount Lemmon Survey	·	1.5 km	MPC · JPL
465447	2008 SE_{22}	—	July 29, 2008	Kitt Peak	Spacewatch	·	1.6 km	MPC · JPL
465448	2008 SV_{23}	—	September 6, 2008	Mount Lemmon	Mount Lemmon Survey	·	1.6 km	MPC · JPL
465449	2008 SZ_{26}	—	September 19, 2008	Kitt Peak	Spacewatch	·	2.4 km	MPC · JPL
465450	2008 SE_{30}	—	September 19, 2008	Kitt Peak	Spacewatch	T_{j} (2.97)	2.8 km	MPC · JPL
465451	2008 SZ_{41}	—	September 2, 2008	Kitt Peak	Spacewatch	·	1.7 km	MPC · JPL
465452	2008 SY_{44}	—	September 6, 2008	Mount Lemmon	Mount Lemmon Survey	·	1.7 km	MPC · JPL
465453	2008 SG_{72}	—	September 6, 2008	Mount Lemmon	Mount Lemmon Survey	·	2.5 km	MPC · JPL
465454	2008 SB_{83}	—	May 16, 2008	Kitt Peak	Spacewatch	·	1.7 km	MPC · JPL
465455	2008 SU_{97}	—	September 21, 2008	Kitt Peak	Spacewatch	·	1.7 km	MPC · JPL
465456	2008 SB_{99}	—	September 21, 2008	Kitt Peak	Spacewatch	·	2.3 km	MPC · JPL
465457	2008 SE_{99}	—	September 21, 2008	Kitt Peak	Spacewatch	·	2.2 km	MPC · JPL
465458	2008 SD_{101}	—	September 21, 2008	Kitt Peak	Spacewatch	EOS	1.6 km	MPC · JPL
465459	2008 SF_{104}	—	September 21, 2008	Kitt Peak	Spacewatch	·	1.7 km	MPC · JPL
465460	2008 SH_{119}	—	September 22, 2008	Mount Lemmon	Mount Lemmon Survey	·	1.7 km	MPC · JPL
465461	2008 SO_{123}	—	September 22, 2008	Mount Lemmon	Mount Lemmon Survey	EOS	1.3 km	MPC · JPL
465462	2008 SK_{125}	—	September 22, 2008	Mount Lemmon	Mount Lemmon Survey	EOS	1.7 km	MPC · JPL
465463	2008 SB_{128}	—	September 22, 2008	Kitt Peak	Spacewatch	·	1.9 km	MPC · JPL
465464	2008 SV_{129}	—	September 22, 2008	Kitt Peak	Spacewatch	EOS	2.0 km	MPC · JPL
465465	2008 SH_{131}	—	September 22, 2008	Kitt Peak	Spacewatch	·	2.3 km	MPC · JPL
465466	2008 SD_{142}	—	September 24, 2008	Mount Lemmon	Mount Lemmon Survey	·	1.8 km	MPC · JPL
465467	2008 SG_{146}	—	September 23, 2008	Kitt Peak	Spacewatch	LIX	3.1 km	MPC · JPL
465468	2008 SD_{196}	—	September 25, 2008	Kitt Peak	Spacewatch	·	3.3 km	MPC · JPL
465469	2008 SL_{201}	—	September 26, 2008	Kitt Peak	Spacewatch	·	2.7 km	MPC · JPL
465470	2008 SM_{256}	—	September 20, 2008	Mount Lemmon	Mount Lemmon Survey	·	1.7 km	MPC · JPL
465471	2008 SE_{265}	—	September 26, 2008	Kitt Peak	Spacewatch	·	2.7 km	MPC · JPL
465472	2008 SV_{265}	—	September 29, 2008	Kitt Peak	Spacewatch	·	2.3 km	MPC · JPL
465473	2008 SP_{267}	—	September 23, 2008	Kitt Peak	Spacewatch	EOS	1.8 km	MPC · JPL
465474	2008 SO_{270}	—	September 24, 2008	Kitt Peak	Spacewatch	·	2.5 km	MPC · JPL
465475	2008 SF_{274}	—	September 19, 2008	Kitt Peak	Spacewatch	KOR	1.4 km	MPC · JPL
465476	2008 SB_{279}	—	September 29, 2008	Kitt Peak	Spacewatch	·	1.7 km	MPC · JPL
465477	2008 SK_{281}	—	September 28, 2008	Mount Lemmon	Mount Lemmon Survey	·	2.1 km	MPC · JPL
465478	2008 SP_{299}	—	September 22, 2008	Kitt Peak	Spacewatch	·	2.1 km	MPC · JPL
465479	2008 TV_{6}	—	September 24, 2008	Kitt Peak	Spacewatch	·	3.1 km	MPC · JPL
465480	2008 TG_{32}	—	October 1, 2008	Kitt Peak	Spacewatch	·	3.6 km	MPC · JPL
465481	2008 TJ_{33}	—	October 1, 2008	Kitt Peak	Spacewatch	·	1.7 km	MPC · JPL
465482	2008 TF_{62}	—	September 22, 2008	Mount Lemmon	Mount Lemmon Survey	·	1.7 km	MPC · JPL
465483	2008 TL_{62}	—	September 22, 2008	Mount Lemmon	Mount Lemmon Survey	KOR	1.3 km	MPC · JPL
465484	2008 TK_{64}	—	October 2, 2008	Kitt Peak	Spacewatch	·	2.2 km	MPC · JPL
465485	2008 TW_{69}	—	September 23, 2008	Kitt Peak	Spacewatch	·	2.4 km	MPC · JPL
465486	2008 TX_{74}	—	October 2, 2008	Kitt Peak	Spacewatch	·	1.9 km	MPC · JPL
465487	2008 TM_{79}	—	September 22, 2008	Mount Lemmon	Mount Lemmon Survey	·	2.3 km	MPC · JPL
465488	2008 TU_{84}	—	October 3, 2008	Kitt Peak	Spacewatch	·	1.6 km	MPC · JPL
465489	2008 TQ_{89}	—	September 29, 2008	Kitt Peak	Spacewatch	·	1.5 km	MPC · JPL
465490	2008 TE_{97}	—	October 6, 2008	Kitt Peak	Spacewatch	L4	7.3 km	MPC · JPL
465491	2008 TP_{103}	—	October 6, 2008	Kitt Peak	Spacewatch	·	1.6 km	MPC · JPL
465492	2008 TF_{112}	—	September 23, 2008	Kitt Peak	Spacewatch	·	1.9 km	MPC · JPL
465493	2008 TS_{114}	—	September 27, 2008	Mount Lemmon	Mount Lemmon Survey	EOS	1.8 km	MPC · JPL
465494	2008 TH_{142}	—	September 3, 2008	Kitt Peak	Spacewatch	·	1.8 km	MPC · JPL
465495	2008 TV_{162}	—	October 1, 2008	Kitt Peak	Spacewatch	HYG	1.9 km	MPC · JPL
465496	2008 TX_{167}	—	October 10, 2008	Kitt Peak	Spacewatch	·	2.1 km	MPC · JPL
465497	2008 TV_{176}	—	October 6, 2008	Mount Lemmon	Mount Lemmon Survey	·	2.2 km	MPC · JPL
465498	2008 TT_{177}	—	October 6, 2008	Catalina	CSS	·	2.8 km	MPC · JPL
465499	2008 TF_{189}	—	April 9, 2005	Mount Lemmon	Mount Lemmon Survey	·	3.5 km	MPC · JPL
465500	2008 UZ	—	September 3, 2008	Kitt Peak	Spacewatch	·	2.2 km	MPC · JPL

== 465501–465600 ==
back to top

Designation			Discovery			Properties		Ref
Permanent	Provisional	Named after	Date	Site	Discoverer(s)	Category	Diam.	Ref
465501	2008 UR_{15}	—	October 8, 2008	Mount Lemmon	Mount Lemmon Survey	·	1.6 km	MPC · JPL
465502	2008 UZ_{32}	—	October 20, 2008	Kitt Peak	Spacewatch	EOS	1.9 km	MPC · JPL
465503	2008 UX_{34}	—	October 20, 2008	Mount Lemmon	Mount Lemmon Survey	·	3.6 km	MPC · JPL
465504	2008 UA_{41}	—	September 23, 2008	Mount Lemmon	Mount Lemmon Survey	·	2.7 km	MPC · JPL
465505	2008 UL_{47}	—	October 20, 2008	Kitt Peak	Spacewatch	·	3.4 km	MPC · JPL
465506	2008 US_{65}	—	October 7, 2008	Mount Lemmon	Mount Lemmon Survey	·	1.9 km	MPC · JPL
465507	2008 UP_{73}	—	October 21, 2008	Kitt Peak	Spacewatch	·	3.0 km	MPC · JPL
465508	2008 UM_{74}	—	October 21, 2008	Kitt Peak	Spacewatch	EOS	2.1 km	MPC · JPL
465509	2008 UV_{82}	—	October 22, 2008	Kitt Peak	Spacewatch	·	2.4 km	MPC · JPL
465510	2008 UT_{89}	—	October 24, 2008	Mount Lemmon	Mount Lemmon Survey	·	1.3 km	MPC · JPL
465511	2008 UZ_{112}	—	October 22, 2008	Kitt Peak	Spacewatch	·	1.9 km	MPC · JPL
465512	2008 UV_{127}	—	October 22, 2008	Kitt Peak	Spacewatch	·	3.2 km	MPC · JPL
465513 Chenchen	2008 UO_{128}	Chenchen	October 22, 2008	Lulin	X. Y. Hsiao, Q. Ye	·	2.2 km	MPC · JPL
465514	2008 UU_{131}	—	October 1, 2008	Mount Lemmon	Mount Lemmon Survey	EOS	2.0 km	MPC · JPL
465515	2008 UB_{136}	—	September 9, 2008	Mount Lemmon	Mount Lemmon Survey	·	2.2 km	MPC · JPL
465516	2008 UO_{137}	—	October 23, 2008	Kitt Peak	Spacewatch	VER	2.8 km	MPC · JPL
465517	2008 UD_{139}	—	October 23, 2008	Kitt Peak	Spacewatch	KOR	1.1 km	MPC · JPL
465518	2008 UA_{146}	—	October 23, 2008	Kitt Peak	Spacewatch	·	1.5 km	MPC · JPL
465519	2008 UC_{151}	—	October 23, 2008	Kitt Peak	Spacewatch	·	4.8 km	MPC · JPL
465520	2008 UG_{154}	—	October 23, 2008	Kitt Peak	Spacewatch	·	2.4 km	MPC · JPL
465521	2008 UR_{166}	—	September 24, 2008	Mount Lemmon	Mount Lemmon Survey	EOS	1.7 km	MPC · JPL
465522	2008 UL_{177}	—	October 24, 2008	Mount Lemmon	Mount Lemmon Survey	·	2.8 km	MPC · JPL
465523	2008 UZ_{179}	—	October 24, 2008	Kitt Peak	Spacewatch	·	2.5 km	MPC · JPL
465524	2008 UC_{183}	—	October 24, 2008	Mount Lemmon	Mount Lemmon Survey	·	2.4 km	MPC · JPL
465525	2008 UL_{187}	—	September 11, 2007	Kitt Peak	Spacewatch	·	2.7 km	MPC · JPL
465526	2008 UG_{192}	—	September 27, 2008	Mount Lemmon	Mount Lemmon Survey	·	3.1 km	MPC · JPL
465527	2008 UH_{196}	—	October 27, 2008	Mount Lemmon	Mount Lemmon Survey	·	2.2 km	MPC · JPL
465528	2008 US_{205}	—	October 23, 2008	Cerro Burek	Burek, Cerro	·	2.8 km	MPC · JPL
465529	2008 UR_{233}	—	October 26, 2008	Kitt Peak	Spacewatch	EOS	2.4 km	MPC · JPL
465530	2008 UU_{236}	—	October 26, 2008	Kitt Peak	Spacewatch	·	4.6 km	MPC · JPL
465531	2008 UW_{248}	—	October 26, 2008	Kitt Peak	Spacewatch	·	2.9 km	MPC · JPL
465532	2008 UL_{252}	—	October 27, 2008	Kitt Peak	Spacewatch	·	3.5 km	MPC · JPL
465533	2008 UJ_{262}	—	October 27, 2008	Kitt Peak	Spacewatch	·	1.8 km	MPC · JPL
465534	2008 UR_{265}	—	September 23, 2008	Mount Lemmon	Mount Lemmon Survey	·	1.6 km	MPC · JPL
465535	2008 UQ_{267}	—	October 28, 2008	Kitt Peak	Spacewatch	·	1.9 km	MPC · JPL
465536	2008 UU_{279}	—	October 28, 2008	Mount Lemmon	Mount Lemmon Survey	·	1.7 km	MPC · JPL
465537	2008 UM_{285}	—	September 29, 2008	Mount Lemmon	Mount Lemmon Survey	·	2.7 km	MPC · JPL
465538	2008 UX_{285}	—	September 29, 2008	Kitt Peak	Spacewatch	·	2.7 km	MPC · JPL
465539	2008 UM_{306}	—	October 30, 2008	Kitt Peak	Spacewatch	EOS	1.5 km	MPC · JPL
465540	2008 UC_{322}	—	September 28, 2008	Mount Lemmon	Mount Lemmon Survey	EOS	1.9 km	MPC · JPL
465541	2008 UP_{348}	—	October 25, 2008	Kitt Peak	Spacewatch	EOS	1.9 km	MPC · JPL
465542	2008 UF_{349}	—	October 27, 2008	Mount Lemmon	Mount Lemmon Survey	·	2.0 km	MPC · JPL
465543	2008 UJ_{349}	—	October 27, 2008	Mount Lemmon	Mount Lemmon Survey	·	2.0 km	MPC · JPL
465544	2008 UE_{353}	—	October 28, 2008	Kitt Peak	Spacewatch	·	1.6 km	MPC · JPL
465545	2008 UH_{369}	—	October 27, 2008	Kitt Peak	Spacewatch	·	3.3 km	MPC · JPL
465546	2008 VP_{7}	—	November 2, 2008	Catalina	CSS	·	3.4 km	MPC · JPL
465547	2008 VN_{12}	—	November 2, 2008	Mount Lemmon	Mount Lemmon Survey	LIX	3.1 km	MPC · JPL
465548	2008 VG_{40}	—	October 22, 2008	Kitt Peak	Spacewatch	·	570 m	MPC · JPL
465549	2008 VD_{41}	—	November 3, 2008	Kitt Peak	Spacewatch	·	2.4 km	MPC · JPL
465550	2008 VF_{45}	—	November 3, 2008	Mount Lemmon	Mount Lemmon Survey	·	2.5 km	MPC · JPL
465551	2008 VR_{48}	—	October 30, 2008	Kitt Peak	Spacewatch	·	2.9 km	MPC · JPL
465552	2008 VE_{63}	—	September 22, 2008	Mount Lemmon	Mount Lemmon Survey	EOS	1.9 km	MPC · JPL
465553	2008 VC_{66}	—	November 1, 2008	Mount Lemmon	Mount Lemmon Survey	·	2.2 km	MPC · JPL
465554	2008 WR_{11}	—	October 23, 2008	Kitt Peak	Spacewatch	·	3.4 km	MPC · JPL
465555	2008 WQ_{18}	—	October 28, 2008	Mount Lemmon	Mount Lemmon Survey	HYG	2.2 km	MPC · JPL
465556	2008 WP_{31}	—	November 19, 2008	Mount Lemmon	Mount Lemmon Survey	·	3.0 km	MPC · JPL
465557	2008 WW_{35}	—	October 23, 2008	Kitt Peak	Spacewatch	·	2.7 km	MPC · JPL
465558	2008 WX_{36}	—	October 20, 2008	Kitt Peak	Spacewatch	·	2.6 km	MPC · JPL
465559	2008 WT_{46}	—	November 17, 2008	Kitt Peak	Spacewatch	·	4.0 km	MPC · JPL
465560	2008 WD_{68}	—	November 18, 2008	Kitt Peak	Spacewatch	·	2.6 km	MPC · JPL
465561	2008 WR_{80}	—	November 20, 2008	Kitt Peak	Spacewatch	VER	2.5 km	MPC · JPL
465562	2008 WV_{82}	—	November 20, 2008	Kitt Peak	Spacewatch	·	2.4 km	MPC · JPL
465563	2008 WS_{87}	—	November 1, 2008	Mount Lemmon	Mount Lemmon Survey	·	2.3 km	MPC · JPL
465564	2008 WC_{92}	—	June 25, 2007	Kitt Peak	Spacewatch	·	1.9 km	MPC · JPL
465565	2008 WE_{103}	—	October 7, 2008	Mount Lemmon	Mount Lemmon Survey	·	3.6 km	MPC · JPL
465566	2008 WX_{103}	—	October 21, 2008	Kitt Peak	Spacewatch	·	2.0 km	MPC · JPL
465567	2008 WD_{109}	—	September 5, 2008	Kitt Peak	Spacewatch	·	3.0 km	MPC · JPL
465568	2008 WY_{109}	—	October 28, 2008	Kitt Peak	Spacewatch	·	520 m	MPC · JPL
465569	2008 WH_{113}	—	November 18, 2008	Kitt Peak	Spacewatch	·	2.7 km	MPC · JPL
465570	2008 WA_{114}	—	September 3, 2008	Kitt Peak	Spacewatch	·	4.1 km	MPC · JPL
465571	2008 WE_{122}	—	November 19, 2008	Mount Lemmon	Mount Lemmon Survey	THM	1.7 km	MPC · JPL
465572	2008 WZ_{130}	—	November 19, 2008	Mount Lemmon	Mount Lemmon Survey	·	2.8 km	MPC · JPL
465573	2008 WA_{131}	—	November 22, 2008	Kitt Peak	Spacewatch	·	2.8 km	MPC · JPL
465574	2008 WG_{138}	—	November 30, 2008	Kitt Peak	Spacewatch	·	2.9 km	MPC · JPL
465575	2008 WB_{139}	—	November 30, 2008	Socorro	LINEAR	·	3.5 km	MPC · JPL
465576	2008 XV_{13}	—	November 6, 2008	Kitt Peak	Spacewatch	·	2.7 km	MPC · JPL
465577	2008 XA_{51}	—	December 4, 2008	Kitt Peak	Spacewatch	HYG	2.7 km	MPC · JPL
465578	2008 YZ_{14}	—	October 23, 2008	Mount Lemmon	Mount Lemmon Survey	·	3.0 km	MPC · JPL
465579	2008 YT_{26}	—	December 24, 2008	Dauban	Kugel, F.	·	3.0 km	MPC · JPL
465580	2008 YE_{42}	—	November 6, 2008	Mount Lemmon	Mount Lemmon Survey	·	3.3 km	MPC · JPL
465581	2008 YD_{59}	—	December 22, 2008	Kitt Peak	Spacewatch	·	560 m	MPC · JPL
465582	2008 YO_{80}	—	December 30, 2008	Kitt Peak	Spacewatch	·	3.3 km	MPC · JPL
465583	2008 YQ_{85}	—	December 29, 2008	Kitt Peak	Spacewatch	·	3.0 km	MPC · JPL
465584	2008 YR_{118}	—	December 29, 2008	Kitt Peak	Spacewatch	·	620 m	MPC · JPL
465585	2008 YG_{130}	—	December 31, 2008	Kitt Peak	Spacewatch	·	3.1 km	MPC · JPL
465586	2008 YB_{132}	—	December 31, 2008	Kitt Peak	Spacewatch	·	510 m	MPC · JPL
465587	2008 YK_{142}	—	October 31, 2008	Mount Lemmon	Mount Lemmon Survey	·	2.5 km	MPC · JPL
465588	2008 YG_{162}	—	December 21, 2008	Kitt Peak	Spacewatch	·	490 m	MPC · JPL
465589	2008 YR_{172}	—	December 21, 2008	Kitt Peak	Spacewatch	·	600 m	MPC · JPL
465590	2009 AR_{35}	—	December 22, 2008	Mount Lemmon	Mount Lemmon Survey	·	660 m	MPC · JPL
465591	2009 AE_{43}	—	January 3, 2009	Kitt Peak	Spacewatch	·	600 m	MPC · JPL
465592	2009 AZ_{44}	—	January 2, 2009	Kitt Peak	Spacewatch	·	550 m	MPC · JPL
465593	2009 BL_{26}	—	January 16, 2009	Kitt Peak	Spacewatch	·	3.0 km	MPC · JPL
465594	2009 BX_{26}	—	January 16, 2009	Kitt Peak	Spacewatch	·	4.2 km	MPC · JPL
465595	2009 BU_{87}	—	December 30, 2008	Mount Lemmon	Mount Lemmon Survey	·	730 m	MPC · JPL
465596	2009 BQ_{127}	—	January 29, 2009	Kitt Peak	Spacewatch	·	630 m	MPC · JPL
465597	2009 BT_{133}	—	January 29, 2009	Kitt Peak	Spacewatch	·	500 m	MPC · JPL
465598	2009 BL_{137}	—	January 29, 2009	Kitt Peak	Spacewatch	·	680 m	MPC · JPL
465599	2009 BS_{141}	—	January 30, 2009	Kitt Peak	Spacewatch	·	560 m	MPC · JPL
465600	2009 BK_{172}	—	January 18, 2009	Kitt Peak	Spacewatch	·	550 m	MPC · JPL

== 465601–465700 ==
back to top

Designation			Discovery			Properties		Ref
Permanent	Provisional	Named after	Date	Site	Discoverer(s)	Category	Diam.	Ref
465601	2009 BE_{189}	—	January 25, 2009	Catalina	CSS	·	3.4 km	MPC · JPL
465602	2009 CU_{10}	—	February 1, 2009	Mount Lemmon	Mount Lemmon Survey	·	700 m	MPC · JPL
465603	2009 CW_{27}	—	February 1, 2009	Kitt Peak	Spacewatch	·	780 m	MPC · JPL
465604	2009 CT_{43}	—	February 14, 2009	Mount Lemmon	Mount Lemmon Survey	·	590 m	MPC · JPL
465605	2009 DV_{18}	—	February 20, 2009	Mount Lemmon	Mount Lemmon Survey	·	3.9 km	MPC · JPL
465606	2009 DX_{22}	—	February 14, 2009	Kitt Peak	Spacewatch	·	750 m	MPC · JPL
465607	2009 DP_{43}	—	September 11, 2007	Mount Lemmon	Mount Lemmon Survey	·	670 m	MPC · JPL
465608	2009 DL_{49}	—	February 19, 2009	Kitt Peak	Spacewatch	CYB	3.2 km	MPC · JPL
465609	2009 DN_{50}	—	February 19, 2009	Kitt Peak	Spacewatch	(2076)	620 m	MPC · JPL
465610	2009 DR_{53}	—	February 1, 2009	Mount Lemmon	Mount Lemmon Survey	·	580 m	MPC · JPL
465611	2009 DC_{75}	—	February 19, 2009	Kitt Peak	Spacewatch	·	680 m	MPC · JPL
465612	2009 DT_{84}	—	October 23, 2004	Kitt Peak	Spacewatch	·	530 m	MPC · JPL
465613	2009 DS_{125}	—	February 19, 2009	Kitt Peak	Spacewatch	NYS	590 m	MPC · JPL
465614	2009 DU_{130}	—	February 28, 2009	Kitt Peak	Spacewatch	·	730 m	MPC · JPL
465615	2009 DH_{135}	—	February 28, 2009	Kitt Peak	Spacewatch	·	760 m	MPC · JPL
465616	2009 EC	—	March 1, 2009	Catalina	CSS	AMO	610 m	MPC · JPL
465617	2009 EK_{1}	—	March 2, 2009	Mount Lemmon	Mount Lemmon Survey	APO · PHA	190 m	MPC · JPL
465618	2009 EJ_{29}	—	March 2, 2009	Mount Lemmon	Mount Lemmon Survey	·	620 m	MPC · JPL
465619	2009 FJ_{22}	—	March 18, 2009	Siding Spring	SSS	·	590 m	MPC · JPL
465620	2009 FT_{36}	—	March 1, 2009	Kitt Peak	Spacewatch	·	690 m	MPC · JPL
465621	2009 FQ_{42}	—	March 28, 2009	Kitt Peak	Spacewatch	·	620 m	MPC · JPL
465622	2009 FS_{52}	—	March 29, 2009	Kitt Peak	Spacewatch	CYB	3.3 km	MPC · JPL
465623	2009 FK_{72}	—	February 20, 2009	Kitt Peak	Spacewatch	·	590 m	MPC · JPL
465624	2009 HK_{15}	—	March 16, 2009	Mount Lemmon	Mount Lemmon Survey	·	810 m	MPC · JPL
465625	2009 HR_{20}	—	November 5, 2007	Mount Lemmon	Mount Lemmon Survey	·	800 m	MPC · JPL
465626	2009 HD_{22}	—	April 17, 2009	Kitt Peak	Spacewatch	·	960 m	MPC · JPL
465627	2009 HB_{23}	—	April 17, 2009	Kitt Peak	Spacewatch	·	890 m	MPC · JPL
465628	2009 HT_{31}	—	April 19, 2009	Kitt Peak	Spacewatch	·	1.1 km	MPC · JPL
465629	2009 HC_{38}	—	April 2, 2009	Mount Lemmon	Mount Lemmon Survey	V	530 m	MPC · JPL
465630	2009 HH_{82}	—	March 31, 2009	Mount Lemmon	Mount Lemmon Survey	·	1.2 km	MPC · JPL
465631	2009 HE_{93}	—	April 30, 2009	Kitt Peak	Spacewatch	·	940 m	MPC · JPL
465632	2009 JN_{2}	—	May 13, 2009	Tzec Maun	Tozzi, F.	PHO	990 m	MPC · JPL
465633	2009 JR_{5}	—	May 15, 2009	Kitt Peak	Spacewatch	APO · PHA	290 m	MPC · JPL
465634	2009 JS_{6}	—	May 4, 2009	Mount Lemmon	Mount Lemmon Survey	·	590 m	MPC · JPL
465635	2009 KA_{13}	—	May 14, 2009	Kitt Peak	Spacewatch	·	970 m	MPC · JPL
465636	2009 KS_{15}	—	April 23, 2009	Kitt Peak	Spacewatch	·	790 m	MPC · JPL
465637	2009 KK_{17}	—	April 30, 2009	Kitt Peak	Spacewatch	·	850 m	MPC · JPL
465638	2009 KH_{23}	—	April 20, 2009	Kitt Peak	Spacewatch	·	1.1 km	MPC · JPL
465639	2009 LY_{6}	—	June 15, 2009	Mount Lemmon	Mount Lemmon Survey	·	1.4 km	MPC · JPL
465640	2009 MN_{9}	—	May 29, 2005	Campo Imperatore	CINEOS	·	1.5 km	MPC · JPL
465641	2009 PW_{3}	—	July 30, 2009	Kitt Peak	Spacewatch	·	1.4 km	MPC · JPL
465642	2009 PX_{7}	—	August 15, 2009	Kitt Peak	Spacewatch	PHO	880 m	MPC · JPL
465643	2009 PY_{12}	—	August 15, 2009	Kitt Peak	Spacewatch	·	930 m	MPC · JPL
465644	2009 QG_{3}	—	July 31, 2009	Kitt Peak	Spacewatch	·	960 m	MPC · JPL
465645	2009 QP_{3}	—	August 16, 2009	Catalina	CSS	·	1.1 km	MPC · JPL
465646	2009 QJ_{7}	—	August 16, 2009	Kitt Peak	Spacewatch	·	1.4 km	MPC · JPL
465647	2009 QM_{9}	—	August 19, 2009	Hibiscus	Teamo, N.	·	880 m	MPC · JPL
465648	2009 QA_{23}	—	August 20, 2009	Kitt Peak	Spacewatch	·	1.7 km	MPC · JPL
465649	2009 QD_{57}	—	August 20, 2009	Kitt Peak	Spacewatch	·	1.1 km	MPC · JPL
465650	2009 RT_{8}	—	September 12, 2009	Kitt Peak	Spacewatch	L4	8.9 km	MPC · JPL
465651	2009 RN_{15}	—	September 12, 2009	Kitt Peak	Spacewatch	EUN	1.2 km	MPC · JPL
465652	2009 RA_{35}	—	September 14, 2009	Kitt Peak	Spacewatch	L4	9.5 km	MPC · JPL
465653	2009 RL_{35}	—	September 14, 2009	Kitt Peak	Spacewatch	·	1.7 km	MPC · JPL
465654	2009 RR_{49}	—	September 15, 2009	Kitt Peak	Spacewatch	·	1.4 km	MPC · JPL
465655	2009 RU_{49}	—	September 15, 2009	Kitt Peak	Spacewatch	·	1.8 km	MPC · JPL
465656	2009 RB_{50}	—	September 15, 2009	Kitt Peak	Spacewatch	·	1.1 km	MPC · JPL
465657	2009 RU_{54}	—	September 15, 2009	Kitt Peak	Spacewatch	·	1.3 km	MPC · JPL
465658	2009 RX_{62}	—	September 12, 2009	Kitt Peak	Spacewatch	L4	10 km	MPC · JPL
465659	2009 RE_{72}	—	September 15, 2009	Kitt Peak	Spacewatch	·	2.3 km	MPC · JPL
465660	2009 RJ_{72}	—	September 12, 2009	Kitt Peak	Spacewatch	·	1.9 km	MPC · JPL
465661	2009 RC_{73}	—	September 15, 2009	Kitt Peak	Spacewatch	WIT	780 m	MPC · JPL
465662	2009 SD_{13}	—	September 16, 2009	Mount Lemmon	Mount Lemmon Survey	·	1.2 km	MPC · JPL
465663	2009 SD_{44}	—	September 16, 2009	Kitt Peak	Spacewatch	·	3.0 km	MPC · JPL
465664	2009 SL_{47}	—	September 16, 2009	Kitt Peak	Spacewatch	·	1.2 km	MPC · JPL
465665	2009 SV_{50}	—	September 17, 2009	Kitt Peak	Spacewatch	·	1.6 km	MPC · JPL
465666	2009 SP_{51}	—	September 17, 2009	Mount Lemmon	Mount Lemmon Survey	·	1.8 km	MPC · JPL
465667	2009 SE_{69}	—	September 17, 2009	Kitt Peak	Spacewatch	·	2.1 km	MPC · JPL
465668	2009 SG_{76}	—	September 17, 2009	Kitt Peak	Spacewatch	·	1.5 km	MPC · JPL
465669	2009 SV_{76}	—	April 7, 2003	Kitt Peak	Spacewatch	·	1.5 km	MPC · JPL
465670	2009 SD_{80}	—	August 30, 2005	Kitt Peak	Spacewatch	·	670 m	MPC · JPL
465671	2009 SK_{91}	—	September 18, 2009	Kitt Peak	Spacewatch	·	1.2 km	MPC · JPL
465672	2009 SD_{105}	—	September 16, 2009	Kitt Peak	Spacewatch	·	1.8 km	MPC · JPL
465673	2009 SM_{108}	—	September 16, 2009	Mount Lemmon	Mount Lemmon Survey	·	1.6 km	MPC · JPL
465674	2009 SL_{136}	—	April 5, 2003	Kitt Peak	Spacewatch	·	1.8 km	MPC · JPL
465675	2009 SC_{138}	—	September 18, 2009	Kitt Peak	Spacewatch	·	1.8 km	MPC · JPL
465676	2009 ST_{160}	—	September 20, 2009	Kitt Peak	Spacewatch	H	460 m	MPC · JPL
465677	2009 SY_{193}	—	September 12, 2009	Kitt Peak	Spacewatch	·	2.1 km	MPC · JPL
465678	2009 SY_{194}	—	September 22, 2009	Kitt Peak	Spacewatch	·	1.2 km	MPC · JPL
465679	2009 SC_{203}	—	September 22, 2009	Kitt Peak	Spacewatch	·	1.6 km	MPC · JPL
465680	2009 SE_{203}	—	September 22, 2009	Kitt Peak	Spacewatch	MAR	930 m	MPC · JPL
465681	2009 SD_{205}	—	September 18, 2009	Kitt Peak	Spacewatch	·	1.5 km	MPC · JPL
465682	2009 SC_{208}	—	September 23, 2009	Kitt Peak	Spacewatch	·	1.6 km	MPC · JPL
465683	2009 SV_{212}	—	September 23, 2009	Kitt Peak	Spacewatch	EUN	1.1 km	MPC · JPL
465684	2009 SA_{213}	—	September 23, 2009	Kitt Peak	Spacewatch	·	1.7 km	MPC · JPL
465685	2009 SR_{215}	—	September 15, 2009	Kitt Peak	Spacewatch	·	1.5 km	MPC · JPL
465686	2009 SD_{233}	—	September 19, 2009	Catalina	CSS	·	2.2 km	MPC · JPL
465687	2009 SC_{236}	—	August 29, 2009	Catalina	CSS	·	1.9 km	MPC · JPL
465688	2009 SE_{258}	—	September 21, 2009	Mount Lemmon	Mount Lemmon Survey	L4	7.5 km	MPC · JPL
465689	2009 SO_{269}	—	September 24, 2009	Kitt Peak	Spacewatch	·	1.4 km	MPC · JPL
465690	2009 SX_{269}	—	September 24, 2009	Kitt Peak	Spacewatch	·	1.3 km	MPC · JPL
465691	2009 SC_{271}	—	September 16, 2009	Kitt Peak	Spacewatch	·	1.3 km	MPC · JPL
465692	2009 SC_{281}	—	August 18, 2009	Kitt Peak	Spacewatch	·	1.4 km	MPC · JPL
465693	2009 SY_{285}	—	October 25, 2005	Kitt Peak	Spacewatch	·	1.0 km	MPC · JPL
465694	2009 ST_{286}	—	September 25, 2009	Kitt Peak	Spacewatch	·	1.7 km	MPC · JPL
465695	2009 SQ_{288}	—	September 25, 2009	Catalina	CSS	·	1.5 km	MPC · JPL
465696	2009 SU_{303}	—	September 16, 2009	Catalina	CSS	EUN	1.1 km	MPC · JPL
465697	2009 SE_{338}	—	September 19, 2009	Catalina	CSS	·	2.1 km	MPC · JPL
465698	2009 SZ_{341}	—	September 16, 2009	Kitt Peak	Spacewatch	·	1.6 km	MPC · JPL
465699	2009 SC_{352}	—	September 29, 2009	Mount Lemmon	Mount Lemmon Survey	H	530 m	MPC · JPL
465700	2009 SN_{354}	—	September 21, 2009	Mount Lemmon	Mount Lemmon Survey	·	1.7 km	MPC · JPL

== 465701–465800 ==
back to top

Designation			Discovery			Properties		Ref
Permanent	Provisional	Named after	Date	Site	Discoverer(s)	Category	Diam.	Ref
465701	2009 SM_{355}	—	September 19, 2009	Mount Lemmon	Mount Lemmon Survey	·	2.3 km	MPC · JPL
465702	2009 TN_{22}	—	October 13, 2009	La Sagra	OAM	·	2.4 km	MPC · JPL
465703	2009 TH_{25}	—	October 14, 2009	Mount Lemmon	Mount Lemmon Survey	BRG	1.2 km	MPC · JPL
465704	2009 TB_{32}	—	September 27, 2009	Catalina	CSS	·	1.8 km	MPC · JPL
465705	2009 TN_{35}	—	October 14, 2009	La Sagra	OAM	·	1.2 km	MPC · JPL
465706	2009 TK_{41}	—	October 14, 2009	Catalina	CSS	H	610 m	MPC · JPL
465707	2009 TR_{45}	—	October 15, 2009	Catalina	CSS	·	2.4 km	MPC · JPL
465708	2009 UW_{5}	—	October 18, 2009	Catalina	CSS	·	2.2 km	MPC · JPL
465709	2009 UX_{9}	—	September 25, 2009	Kitt Peak	Spacewatch	AGN	950 m	MPC · JPL
465710	2009 UG_{20}	—	October 22, 2009	Auberry	Auberry	·	3.1 km	MPC · JPL
465711	2009 UM_{32}	—	September 21, 2009	Mount Lemmon	Mount Lemmon Survey	·	1.9 km	MPC · JPL
465712	2009 UU_{38}	—	October 22, 2009	Mount Lemmon	Mount Lemmon Survey	·	1.2 km	MPC · JPL
465713	2009 UA_{62}	—	October 17, 2009	Mount Lemmon	Mount Lemmon Survey	·	1.8 km	MPC · JPL
465714	2009 UK_{63}	—	October 17, 2009	Mount Lemmon	Mount Lemmon Survey	·	1.4 km	MPC · JPL
465715	2009 UT_{66}	—	September 27, 2009	Kitt Peak	Spacewatch	·	1.1 km	MPC · JPL
465716	2009 UV_{69}	—	September 28, 2009	Mount Lemmon	Mount Lemmon Survey	·	1.7 km	MPC · JPL
465717	2009 UQ_{83}	—	October 23, 2009	Mount Lemmon	Mount Lemmon Survey	·	1.8 km	MPC · JPL
465718	2009 UT_{84}	—	October 23, 2009	Mount Lemmon	Mount Lemmon Survey	·	1.1 km	MPC · JPL
465719	2009 UV_{85}	—	September 19, 2009	Mount Lemmon	Mount Lemmon Survey	·	1.6 km	MPC · JPL
465720	2009 UB_{103}	—	September 19, 2009	Catalina	CSS	·	2.5 km	MPC · JPL
465721	2009 UQ_{107}	—	September 21, 2009	Mount Lemmon	Mount Lemmon Survey	·	1.6 km	MPC · JPL
465722	2009 UL_{112}	—	October 25, 2009	Kitt Peak	Spacewatch	·	3.0 km	MPC · JPL
465723	2009 UU_{115}	—	September 20, 2009	Kitt Peak	Spacewatch	·	1.6 km	MPC · JPL
465724	2009 UT_{127}	—	October 24, 2009	Kitt Peak	Spacewatch	(18466)	1.9 km	MPC · JPL
465725	2009 UD_{132}	—	October 16, 2009	Catalina	CSS	·	3.0 km	MPC · JPL
465726	2009 UT_{135}	—	October 18, 2009	Catalina	CSS	MRX	1.2 km	MPC · JPL
465727	2009 UD_{140}	—	October 23, 2009	Mount Lemmon	Mount Lemmon Survey	·	1.9 km	MPC · JPL
465728	2009 US_{151}	—	October 22, 2009	Mount Lemmon	Mount Lemmon Survey	AGN	1.1 km	MPC · JPL
465729	2009 VV_{12}	—	December 25, 2005	Kitt Peak	Spacewatch	HOF	1.9 km	MPC · JPL
465730	2009 VY_{12}	—	October 18, 2009	Mount Lemmon	Mount Lemmon Survey	·	1.5 km	MPC · JPL
465731	2009 VH_{15}	—	November 8, 2009	Mount Lemmon	Mount Lemmon Survey	HOF	2.3 km	MPC · JPL
465732	2009 VP_{15}	—	March 15, 2007	Kitt Peak	Spacewatch	·	2.2 km	MPC · JPL
465733	2009 VQ_{24}	—	October 27, 2009	Kitt Peak	Spacewatch	·	2.0 km	MPC · JPL
465734	2009 VV_{27}	—	October 24, 2009	Kitt Peak	Spacewatch	·	2.3 km	MPC · JPL
465735	2009 VF_{29}	—	November 9, 2009	Kitt Peak	Spacewatch	HOF	2.2 km	MPC · JPL
465736	2009 VL_{32}	—	November 9, 2009	Mount Lemmon	Mount Lemmon Survey	·	1.6 km	MPC · JPL
465737	2009 VW_{50}	—	September 22, 2009	Mount Lemmon	Mount Lemmon Survey	MRX	1.2 km	MPC · JPL
465738	2009 VS_{60}	—	October 25, 2009	Kitt Peak	Spacewatch	·	1.2 km	MPC · JPL
465739	2009 VV_{60}	—	October 26, 2009	Kitt Peak	Spacewatch	H	510 m	MPC · JPL
465740	2009 VN_{61}	—	November 8, 2009	Kitt Peak	Spacewatch	·	1.7 km	MPC · JPL
465741	2009 VR_{72}	—	October 22, 2009	La Sagra	OAM	H	600 m	MPC · JPL
465742	2009 VB_{78}	—	November 9, 2009	Catalina	CSS	·	3.4 km	MPC · JPL
465743	2009 VT_{84}	—	December 19, 2004	Mount Lemmon	Mount Lemmon Survey	·	1.9 km	MPC · JPL
465744	2009 VJ_{87}	—	November 10, 2009	Kitt Peak	Spacewatch	AGN	1.0 km	MPC · JPL
465745	2009 VC_{88}	—	September 20, 2009	Mount Lemmon	Mount Lemmon Survey	·	1.8 km	MPC · JPL
465746	2009 VB_{100}	—	November 9, 2009	Kitt Peak	Spacewatch	·	1.6 km	MPC · JPL
465747	2009 VT_{105}	—	October 25, 2009	Catalina	CSS	(18466)	2.2 km	MPC · JPL
465748	2009 VL_{109}	—	November 9, 2009	Mount Lemmon	Mount Lemmon Survey	·	2.3 km	MPC · JPL
465749	2009 WO_{6}	—	October 18, 2009	Siding Spring	SSS	T_{j} (2.78) · AMO +1km	2.5 km	MPC · JPL
465750	2009 WU_{13}	—	June 9, 2007	Kitt Peak	Spacewatch	·	2.3 km	MPC · JPL
465751	2009 WS_{26}	—	November 16, 2009	Kitt Peak	Spacewatch	DOR	2.9 km	MPC · JPL
465752	2009 WU_{32}	—	November 16, 2009	Kitt Peak	Spacewatch	·	1.9 km	MPC · JPL
465753	2009 WE_{45}	—	October 25, 2009	Kitt Peak	Spacewatch	EUN	1.2 km	MPC · JPL
465754	2009 WK_{45}	—	November 9, 2009	Mount Lemmon	Mount Lemmon Survey	·	2.2 km	MPC · JPL
465755	2009 WG_{50}	—	November 19, 2009	La Sagra	OAM	·	3.0 km	MPC · JPL
465756	2009 WC_{67}	—	November 17, 2009	Mount Lemmon	Mount Lemmon Survey	HOF	2.8 km	MPC · JPL
465757	2009 WG_{70}	—	November 9, 2009	Kitt Peak	Spacewatch	·	1.6 km	MPC · JPL
465758	2009 WE_{71}	—	November 18, 2009	Kitt Peak	Spacewatch	·	1.5 km	MPC · JPL
465759	2009 WW_{89}	—	November 19, 2009	Kitt Peak	Spacewatch	·	1.9 km	MPC · JPL
465760	2009 WE_{105}	—	November 23, 2009	La Sagra	OAM	H	630 m	MPC · JPL
465761	2009 WM_{108}	—	September 23, 2004	Kitt Peak	Spacewatch	AGN	940 m	MPC · JPL
465762	2009 WA_{120}	—	November 20, 2009	Kitt Peak	Spacewatch	·	3.1 km	MPC · JPL
465763	2009 WD_{133}	—	October 23, 2009	Kitt Peak	Spacewatch	·	1.3 km	MPC · JPL
465764	2009 WB_{153}	—	November 19, 2009	Mount Lemmon	Mount Lemmon Survey	·	1.5 km	MPC · JPL
465765	2009 WJ_{175}	—	June 6, 2008	Kitt Peak	Spacewatch	GEF	1.2 km	MPC · JPL
465766	2009 WU_{181}	—	November 10, 2009	Kitt Peak	Spacewatch	·	1.5 km	MPC · JPL
465767	2009 WH_{185}	—	October 18, 2009	Mount Lemmon	Mount Lemmon Survey	·	1.5 km	MPC · JPL
465768	2009 WJ_{188}	—	November 24, 2009	Mount Lemmon	Mount Lemmon Survey	HOF	2.8 km	MPC · JPL
465769	2009 WY_{207}	—	October 16, 2009	Mount Lemmon	Mount Lemmon Survey	·	2.2 km	MPC · JPL
465770	2009 WK_{210}	—	November 18, 2009	Kitt Peak	Spacewatch	·	1.6 km	MPC · JPL
465771	2009 WE_{215}	—	November 10, 2009	Kitt Peak	Spacewatch	·	1.7 km	MPC · JPL
465772	2009 WL_{219}	—	September 22, 2009	Mount Lemmon	Mount Lemmon Survey	·	1.2 km	MPC · JPL
465773	2009 WT_{229}	—	October 23, 2009	Mount Lemmon	Mount Lemmon Survey	MRX	1.1 km	MPC · JPL
465774	2009 WN_{230}	—	November 17, 2009	Kitt Peak	Spacewatch	·	2.6 km	MPC · JPL
465775	2009 WF_{234}	—	October 23, 2009	Kitt Peak	Spacewatch	·	1.8 km	MPC · JPL
465776	2009 WM_{257}	—	November 25, 2009	Kitt Peak	Spacewatch	·	2.1 km	MPC · JPL
465777	2009 XJ_{4}	—	November 20, 2009	Kitt Peak	Spacewatch	·	1.9 km	MPC · JPL
465778	2009 XO_{4}	—	November 9, 2009	Kitt Peak	Spacewatch	EOS	2.0 km	MPC · JPL
465779	2009 YJ_{6}	—	November 25, 2009	Mount Lemmon	Mount Lemmon Survey	·	2.1 km	MPC · JPL
465780	2010 AP_{12}	—	January 6, 2010	Kitt Peak	Spacewatch	·	2.9 km	MPC · JPL
465781	2010 AQ_{32}	—	January 6, 2010	Kitt Peak	Spacewatch	·	2.6 km	MPC · JPL
465782	2010 AF_{33}	—	January 7, 2010	Kitt Peak	Spacewatch	EOS	2.0 km	MPC · JPL
465783	2010 AG_{37}	—	January 7, 2010	Kitt Peak	Spacewatch	·	3.4 km	MPC · JPL
465784	2010 AO_{44}	—	January 7, 2010	Kitt Peak	Spacewatch	·	3.6 km	MPC · JPL
465785	2010 AN_{47}	—	January 8, 2010	Kitt Peak	Spacewatch	·	3.6 km	MPC · JPL
465786	2010 AU_{60}	—	January 11, 2010	Tzec Maun	D. Chestnov, A. Novichonok	·	2.2 km	MPC · JPL
465787	2010 AL_{100}	—	January 12, 2010	WISE	WISE	·	3.9 km	MPC · JPL
465788	2010 AL_{128}	—	January 14, 2010	WISE	WISE	T_{j} (2.98)	4.0 km	MPC · JPL
465789	2010 BV_{1}	—	January 7, 2010	Kitt Peak	Spacewatch	·	2.0 km	MPC · JPL
465790	2010 BH_{9}	—	January 16, 2010	WISE	WISE	·	4.2 km	MPC · JPL
465791	2010 BU_{34}	—	January 18, 2010	WISE	WISE	·	3.4 km	MPC · JPL
465792	2010 BB_{37}	—	January 18, 2010	WISE	WISE	·	4.2 km	MPC · JPL
465793	2010 BR_{66}	—	April 15, 2010	Catalina	CSS	·	4.4 km	MPC · JPL
465794	2010 CT_{2}	—	February 5, 2010	Kitt Peak	Spacewatch	THM	1.9 km	MPC · JPL
465795	2010 CW_{34}	—	February 10, 2010	Kitt Peak	Spacewatch	EOS	1.9 km	MPC · JPL
465796	2010 CC_{36}	—	February 10, 2010	Kitt Peak	Spacewatch	·	3.1 km	MPC · JPL
465797	2010 CS_{44}	—	February 14, 2010	Calvin-Rehoboth	Calvin College	·	3.9 km	MPC · JPL
465798	2010 CV_{63}	—	February 9, 2010	Kitt Peak	Spacewatch	·	2.4 km	MPC · JPL
465799	2010 CB_{72}	—	February 16, 2010	Kitt Peak	Spacewatch	LIX	2.8 km	MPC · JPL
465800	2010 CH_{77}	—	February 13, 2010	Mount Lemmon	Mount Lemmon Survey	·	2.9 km	MPC · JPL

== 465801–465900 ==
back to top

Designation			Discovery			Properties		Ref
Permanent	Provisional	Named after	Date	Site	Discoverer(s)	Category	Diam.	Ref
465801	2010 CL_{84}	—	November 20, 2008	Kitt Peak	Spacewatch	·	2.7 km	MPC · JPL
465802	2010 CP_{115}	—	November 27, 2009	Mount Lemmon	Mount Lemmon Survey	EOS	2.1 km	MPC · JPL
465803	2010 CN_{116}	—	November 27, 2009	Mount Lemmon	Mount Lemmon Survey	·	3.7 km	MPC · JPL
465804	2010 CK_{122}	—	February 9, 2010	Kitt Peak	Spacewatch	·	3.0 km	MPC · JPL
465805	2010 CA_{146}	—	February 15, 2010	Catalina	CSS	·	2.6 km	MPC · JPL
465806	2010 CF_{153}	—	January 12, 2010	Kitt Peak	Spacewatch	·	2.2 km	MPC · JPL
465807	2010 CS_{179}	—	February 14, 2010	Catalina	CSS	·	3.3 km	MPC · JPL
465808	2010 CN_{182}	—	February 13, 2010	Mount Lemmon	Mount Lemmon Survey	THM	1.9 km	MPC · JPL
465809	2010 CU_{182}	—	October 27, 2008	Kitt Peak	Spacewatch	·	3.1 km	MPC · JPL
465810	2010 CB_{183}	—	December 22, 2003	Kitt Peak	Spacewatch	·	3.4 km	MPC · JPL
465811	2010 CH_{248}	—	January 6, 2010	Kitt Peak	Spacewatch	EOS	2.0 km	MPC · JPL
465812	2010 DH_{42}	—	October 22, 2008	Kitt Peak	Spacewatch	·	2.3 km	MPC · JPL
465813	2010 DG_{48}	—	December 2, 2008	Mount Lemmon	Mount Lemmon Survey	HYG	2.3 km	MPC · JPL
465814	2010 DE_{74}	—	February 17, 2010	Kitt Peak	Spacewatch	·	2.2 km	MPC · JPL
465815	2010 EF_{41}	—	March 4, 2010	Kitt Peak	Spacewatch	·	2.7 km	MPC · JPL
465816	2010 EZ_{42}	—	January 8, 2010	Mount Lemmon	Mount Lemmon Survey	·	3.7 km	MPC · JPL
465817	2010 EP_{66}	—	March 4, 2010	Kitt Peak	Spacewatch	·	2.2 km	MPC · JPL
465818	2010 EW_{77}	—	February 19, 2010	Mount Lemmon	Mount Lemmon Survey	·	2.7 km	MPC · JPL
465819	2010 EQ_{86}	—	March 13, 2010	Mount Lemmon	Mount Lemmon Survey	·	4.3 km	MPC · JPL
465820	2010 ER_{104}	—	March 12, 2010	Catalina	CSS	·	4.1 km	MPC · JPL
465821	2010 EE_{122}	—	March 15, 2010	Kitt Peak	Spacewatch	THB	3.6 km	MPC · JPL
465822	2010 EU_{132}	—	March 12, 2010	Mount Lemmon	Mount Lemmon Survey	·	2.7 km	MPC · JPL
465823	2010 EU_{134}	—	March 12, 2010	Kitt Peak	Spacewatch	·	2.6 km	MPC · JPL
465824	2010 FR	—	March 18, 2010	Catalina	CSS	APO · PHA	160 m	MPC · JPL
465825	2010 FD_{96}	—	March 16, 2010	Mount Lemmon	Mount Lemmon Survey	·	2.8 km	MPC · JPL
465826	2010 GA_{24}	—	April 4, 2010	Catalina	CSS	APO · PHA	150 m	MPC · JPL
465827	2010 GF_{134}	—	April 13, 2010	Mount Lemmon	Mount Lemmon Survey	·	4.2 km	MPC · JPL
465828	2010 GB_{135}	—	April 4, 2010	Kitt Peak	Spacewatch	·	3.5 km	MPC · JPL
465829	2010 HD_{18}	—	October 22, 2008	Kitt Peak	Spacewatch	·	2.6 km	MPC · JPL
465830	2010 HC_{79}	—	May 15, 2005	Mount Lemmon	Mount Lemmon Survey	·	5.2 km	MPC · JPL
465831	2010 JX_{10}	—	May 2, 2010	WISE	WISE	PHO	1.6 km	MPC · JPL
465832	2010 JZ_{35}	—	May 5, 2010	Mount Lemmon	Mount Lemmon Survey	·	3.7 km	MPC · JPL
465833	2010 JX_{117}	—	May 8, 2010	Mount Lemmon	Mount Lemmon Survey	CYB	4.1 km	MPC · JPL
465834	2010 LQ_{30}	—	June 6, 2010	WISE	WISE	·	5.1 km	MPC · JPL
465835	2010 LG_{53}	—	June 8, 2010	WISE	WISE	PHO	1.5 km	MPC · JPL
465836	2010 ME_{34}	—	April 24, 2006	Kitt Peak	Spacewatch	·	1.1 km	MPC · JPL
465837	2010 ME_{45}	—	June 22, 2010	WISE	WISE	·	1.8 km	MPC · JPL
465838	2010 MJ_{46}	—	June 23, 2010	WISE	WISE	·	1.3 km	MPC · JPL
465839	2010 NT_{53}	—	October 1, 2003	Kitt Peak	Spacewatch	·	1.5 km	MPC · JPL
465840	2010 NN_{67}	—	March 29, 2009	Kitt Peak	Spacewatch	·	1.4 km	MPC · JPL
465841	2010 NS_{110}	—	January 14, 2008	Kitt Peak	Spacewatch	·	1.6 km	MPC · JPL
465842	2010 OO_{16}	—	September 25, 2006	Kitt Peak	Spacewatch	·	3.2 km	MPC · JPL
465843	2010 OV_{24}	—	July 19, 2010	WISE	WISE	·	1.7 km	MPC · JPL
465844	2010 OW_{36}	—	July 21, 2010	WISE	WISE	·	1.2 km	MPC · JPL
465845	2010 OK_{80}	—	July 26, 2010	WISE	WISE	ERI	1.6 km	MPC · JPL
465846	2010 OK_{122}	—	October 27, 2006	Catalina	CSS	·	2.3 km	MPC · JPL
465847	2010 PJ_{41}	—	August 6, 2010	WISE	WISE	KON	2.4 km	MPC · JPL
465848	2010 PQ_{51}	—	August 7, 2010	WISE	WISE	(5)	1.6 km	MPC · JPL
465849	2010 PD_{60}	—	October 15, 2007	Mount Lemmon	Mount Lemmon Survey	·	670 m	MPC · JPL
465850	2010 PC_{61}	—	August 10, 2010	Kitt Peak	Spacewatch	·	720 m	MPC · JPL
465851	2010 PP_{78}	—	August 10, 2010	Kitt Peak	Spacewatch	·	580 m	MPC · JPL
465852	2010 RS_{16}	—	September 2, 2010	Socorro	LINEAR	·	780 m	MPC · JPL
465853	2010 RJ_{42}	—	September 5, 2010	Mount Lemmon	Mount Lemmon Survey	AMO · critical	430 m	MPC · JPL
465854	2010 RV_{48}	—	February 1, 2008	Mount Lemmon	Mount Lemmon Survey	NYS	1.1 km	MPC · JPL
465855	2010 RB_{59}	—	August 13, 2010	Kitt Peak	Spacewatch	·	750 m	MPC · JPL
465856	2010 RC_{67}	—	January 13, 2008	Kitt Peak	Spacewatch	·	1.1 km	MPC · JPL
465857	2010 RW_{77}	—	September 7, 2010	La Sagra	OAM	NYS	1.3 km	MPC · JPL
465858	2010 RG_{99}	—	September 10, 2010	Kitt Peak	Spacewatch	·	630 m	MPC · JPL
465859	2010 RE_{102}	—	September 10, 2010	Kitt Peak	Spacewatch	·	960 m	MPC · JPL
465860	2010 RJ_{106}	—	September 10, 2010	Kitt Peak	Spacewatch	V	510 m	MPC · JPL
465861	2010 RQ_{111}	—	September 11, 2010	Catalina	CSS	·	1.1 km	MPC · JPL
465862	2010 RH_{116}	—	September 11, 2010	Catalina	CSS	(1547)	1.3 km	MPC · JPL
465863	2010 RC_{123}	—	March 23, 2006	Kitt Peak	Spacewatch	·	670 m	MPC · JPL
465864	2010 RJ_{123}	—	September 9, 2010	Kitt Peak	Spacewatch	·	880 m	MPC · JPL
465865	2010 RD_{166}	—	March 2, 2009	Kitt Peak	Spacewatch	·	740 m	MPC · JPL
465866	2010 SF_{8}	—	March 16, 2009	Mount Lemmon	Mount Lemmon Survey	·	660 m	MPC · JPL
465867	2010 SS_{15}	—	September 28, 2003	Kitt Peak	Spacewatch	·	710 m	MPC · JPL
465868	2010 SX_{26}	—	September 10, 2010	Kitt Peak	Spacewatch	·	1.0 km	MPC · JPL
465869	2010 SW_{28}	—	June 23, 2010	Mount Lemmon	Mount Lemmon Survey	·	1.0 km	MPC · JPL
465870	2010 TX_{6}	—	May 5, 2006	Kitt Peak	Spacewatch	·	660 m	MPC · JPL
465871	2010 TK_{10}	—	September 11, 2010	Kitt Peak	Spacewatch	·	940 m	MPC · JPL
465872	2010 TY_{15}	—	October 3, 2010	Kitt Peak	Spacewatch	·	1.1 km	MPC · JPL
465873	2010 TU_{21}	—	September 17, 2010	Kitt Peak	Spacewatch	·	820 m	MPC · JPL
465874	2010 TB_{22}	—	October 25, 2003	Kitt Peak	Spacewatch	·	870 m	MPC · JPL
465875	2010 TG_{22}	—	March 10, 2005	Mount Lemmon	Mount Lemmon Survey	V	580 m	MPC · JPL
465876	2010 TL_{24}	—	October 1, 2010	Kitt Peak	Spacewatch	·	1.0 km	MPC · JPL
465877	2010 TA_{28}	—	September 2, 2010	Mount Lemmon	Mount Lemmon Survey	V	540 m	MPC · JPL
465878	2010 TM_{34}	—	January 11, 2008	Kitt Peak	Spacewatch	·	940 m	MPC · JPL
465879	2010 TG_{79}	—	August 12, 2010	Kitt Peak	Spacewatch	·	1.1 km	MPC · JPL
465880	2010 TF_{86}	—	October 1, 2010	Mount Lemmon	Mount Lemmon Survey	·	470 m	MPC · JPL
465881	2010 TL_{129}	—	November 14, 2007	Kitt Peak	Spacewatch	·	810 m	MPC · JPL
465882	2010 TC_{139}	—	January 18, 2008	Kitt Peak	Spacewatch	V	610 m	MPC · JPL
465883	2010 TF_{147}	—	October 1, 2010	Catalina	CSS	·	1.5 km	MPC · JPL
465884	2010 TG_{148}	—	May 2, 2006	Mount Lemmon	Mount Lemmon Survey	·	670 m	MPC · JPL
465885	2010 TE_{155}	—	September 18, 2010	Mount Lemmon	Mount Lemmon Survey	·	650 m	MPC · JPL
465886	2010 TB_{162}	—	October 2, 2010	Mount Lemmon	Mount Lemmon Survey	·	820 m	MPC · JPL
465887	2010 TT_{168}	—	October 13, 2010	Catalina	CSS	·	1.2 km	MPC · JPL
465888	2010 TH_{171}	—	October 8, 2010	Catalina	CSS	MAS	710 m	MPC · JPL
465889	2010 UT_{2}	—	July 23, 2010	WISE	WISE	·	2.1 km	MPC · JPL
465890	2010 UW_{3}	—	September 28, 2006	Kitt Peak	Spacewatch	PHO	780 m	MPC · JPL
465891	2010 UA_{4}	—	August 29, 2006	Kitt Peak	Spacewatch	V	530 m	MPC · JPL
465892	2010 UT_{7}	—	October 29, 2010	Mount Lemmon	Mount Lemmon Survey	APO · PHA	400 m	MPC · JPL
465893	2010 UR_{16}	—	December 14, 2003	Kitt Peak	Spacewatch	·	820 m	MPC · JPL
465894	2010 UK_{17}	—	November 10, 1996	Kitt Peak	Spacewatch	·	750 m	MPC · JPL
465895	2010 UE_{44}	—	November 3, 2006	Mount Lemmon	Mount Lemmon Survey	·	970 m	MPC · JPL
465896	2010 UE_{56}	—	December 13, 2006	Kitt Peak	Spacewatch	(5)	1.1 km	MPC · JPL
465897	2010 UK_{58}	—	December 16, 1993	Kitt Peak	Spacewatch	·	1.5 km	MPC · JPL
465898	2010 UN_{80}	—	October 14, 2010	Mount Lemmon	Mount Lemmon Survey	·	1.2 km	MPC · JPL
465899	2010 UX_{89}	—	September 11, 2010	Mount Lemmon	Mount Lemmon Survey	·	1.1 km	MPC · JPL
465900	2010 UG_{107}	—	September 30, 2009	Mount Lemmon	Mount Lemmon Survey	L4	10 km	MPC · JPL

== 465901–466000 ==
back to top

Designation			Discovery			Properties		Ref
Permanent	Provisional	Named after	Date	Site	Discoverer(s)	Category	Diam.	Ref
465901	2010 VL_{22}	—	November 12, 2006	Mount Lemmon	Mount Lemmon Survey	·	1.3 km	MPC · JPL
465902	2010 VF_{30}	—	January 19, 2008	Mount Lemmon	Mount Lemmon Survey	V	620 m	MPC · JPL
465903	2010 VU_{30}	—	November 19, 2003	Kitt Peak	Spacewatch	·	990 m	MPC · JPL
465904	2010 VZ_{46}	—	November 2, 2010	Kitt Peak	Spacewatch	·	1.5 km	MPC · JPL
465905	2010 VY_{54}	—	August 27, 2006	Kitt Peak	Spacewatch	MAS	760 m	MPC · JPL
465906	2010 VJ_{57}	—	December 12, 2006	Kitt Peak	Spacewatch	·	790 m	MPC · JPL
465907	2010 VY_{81}	—	November 3, 2010	Kitt Peak	Spacewatch	·	1.6 km	MPC · JPL
465908	2010 VV_{90}	—	October 19, 1995	Kitt Peak	Spacewatch	·	970 m	MPC · JPL
465909	2010 VM_{105}	—	October 28, 2010	Mount Lemmon	Mount Lemmon Survey	L4	9.3 km	MPC · JPL
465910	2010 VT_{107}	—	September 3, 2010	Mount Lemmon	Mount Lemmon Survey	·	1.2 km	MPC · JPL
465911	2010 VF_{113}	—	April 26, 2008	Kitt Peak	Spacewatch	·	1.9 km	MPC · JPL
465912	2010 VT_{118}	—	October 13, 2010	Mount Lemmon	Mount Lemmon Survey	(5)	1.2 km	MPC · JPL
465913	2010 VB_{120}	—	November 8, 2010	Kitt Peak	Spacewatch	·	1.4 km	MPC · JPL
465914	2010 VQ_{152}	—	October 21, 2006	Mount Lemmon	Mount Lemmon Survey	·	2.0 km	MPC · JPL
465915	2010 VE_{192}	—	November 17, 2006	Kitt Peak	Spacewatch	·	1.1 km	MPC · JPL
465916	2010 VR_{194}	—	November 17, 2006	Mount Lemmon	Mount Lemmon Survey	·	910 m	MPC · JPL
465917	2010 VV_{194}	—	October 30, 2010	Mount Lemmon	Mount Lemmon Survey	KON	1.8 km	MPC · JPL
465918	2010 VG_{198}	—	September 11, 2010	Mount Lemmon	Mount Lemmon Survey	·	1.2 km	MPC · JPL
465919	2010 VT_{206}	—	November 16, 2006	Kitt Peak	Spacewatch	·	950 m	MPC · JPL
465920	2010 VZ_{209}	—	November 3, 2010	Mount Lemmon	Mount Lemmon Survey	·	1.6 km	MPC · JPL
465921	2010 VT_{210}	—	November 4, 2010	Mount Lemmon	Mount Lemmon Survey	·	1.2 km	MPC · JPL
465922	2010 VC_{220}	—	September 30, 1995	Kitt Peak	Spacewatch	V	600 m	MPC · JPL
465923	2010 WX_{3}	—	February 13, 2008	Mount Lemmon	Mount Lemmon Survey	·	1.3 km	MPC · JPL
465924	2010 WH_{16}	—	November 12, 2010	Mount Lemmon	Mount Lemmon Survey	KON	2.1 km	MPC · JPL
465925	2010 WD_{29}	—	November 21, 2006	Mount Lemmon	Mount Lemmon Survey	·	1.4 km	MPC · JPL
465926	2010 WU_{35}	—	December 10, 2006	Kitt Peak	Spacewatch	(5)	1.0 km	MPC · JPL
465927	2010 WE_{52}	—	December 13, 2006	Kitt Peak	Spacewatch	·	1.2 km	MPC · JPL
465928	2010 WY_{57}	—	December 24, 2006	Kitt Peak	Spacewatch	·	1.2 km	MPC · JPL
465929	2010 WC_{70}	—	November 15, 2010	Catalina	CSS	·	1.1 km	MPC · JPL
465930	2010 XA_{4}	—	November 17, 2006	Kitt Peak	Spacewatch	·	1.3 km	MPC · JPL
465931	2010 XN_{50}	—	December 8, 2010	Mount Lemmon	Mount Lemmon Survey	·	1.4 km	MPC · JPL
465932	2010 XV_{55}	—	December 10, 2010	Mount Lemmon	Mount Lemmon Survey	·	2.3 km	MPC · JPL
465933	2010 XW_{71}	—	December 2, 2010	Mount Lemmon	Mount Lemmon Survey	(5)	1.3 km	MPC · JPL
465934	2010 XZ_{71}	—	November 25, 2006	Mount Lemmon	Mount Lemmon Survey	·	1.2 km	MPC · JPL
465935	2010 XT_{77}	—	November 6, 2010	Mount Lemmon	Mount Lemmon Survey	EUN	1.0 km	MPC · JPL
465936	2010 XJ_{83}	—	December 13, 2010	Mount Lemmon	Mount Lemmon Survey	·	1.3 km	MPC · JPL
465937	2010 YT_{4}	—	January 10, 2007	Mount Lemmon	Mount Lemmon Survey	·	1.1 km	MPC · JPL
465938	2011 AR_{20}	—	January 14, 2002	Socorro	LINEAR	·	2.1 km	MPC · JPL
465939	2011 AU_{22}	—	November 15, 2010	Mount Lemmon	Mount Lemmon Survey	·	2.0 km	MPC · JPL
465940	2011 AB_{30}	—	January 9, 2011	Kitt Peak	Spacewatch	·	1.5 km	MPC · JPL
465941	2011 AA_{33}	—	March 10, 2007	Mount Lemmon	Mount Lemmon Survey	·	1.1 km	MPC · JPL
465942	2011 AB_{39}	—	February 21, 2007	Mount Lemmon	Mount Lemmon Survey	·	1.2 km	MPC · JPL
465943	2011 AS_{47}	—	January 27, 2007	Mount Lemmon	Mount Lemmon Survey	(5)	1.1 km	MPC · JPL
465944	2011 AH_{53}	—	April 15, 2007	Kitt Peak	Spacewatch	·	1.4 km	MPC · JPL
465945	2011 AD_{65}	—	December 14, 2010	Mount Lemmon	Mount Lemmon Survey	·	1.6 km	MPC · JPL
465946	2011 AL_{68}	—	January 14, 2011	Kitt Peak	Spacewatch	·	1.5 km	MPC · JPL
465947	2011 BQ_{15}	—	February 23, 2007	Kitt Peak	Spacewatch	·	1.1 km	MPC · JPL
465948	2011 BG_{26}	—	January 19, 2002	Kitt Peak	Spacewatch	·	1.3 km	MPC · JPL
465949	2011 BJ_{33}	—	January 13, 2011	Kitt Peak	Spacewatch	·	1.7 km	MPC · JPL
465950	2011 BR_{33}	—	January 11, 2011	Kitt Peak	Spacewatch	·	1.5 km	MPC · JPL
465951	2011 BA_{34}	—	January 13, 2011	Kitt Peak	Spacewatch	·	2.1 km	MPC · JPL
465952	2011 BC_{47}	—	September 12, 2004	Kitt Peak	Spacewatch	·	1.6 km	MPC · JPL
465953	2011 BK_{49}	—	March 26, 2007	Kitt Peak	Spacewatch	WIT	1.1 km	MPC · JPL
465954	2011 BX_{49}	—	September 22, 2000	Kitt Peak	Spacewatch	·	1.8 km	MPC · JPL
465955	2011 BK_{60}	—	January 24, 2011	Kitt Peak	Spacewatch	·	1.3 km	MPC · JPL
465956	2011 BO_{62}	—	January 11, 2011	Catalina	CSS	·	1.5 km	MPC · JPL
465957	2011 BR_{67}	—	August 17, 2009	Kitt Peak	Spacewatch	·	2.2 km	MPC · JPL
465958	2011 BR_{73}	—	January 17, 2011	Mount Lemmon	Mount Lemmon Survey	BRA	1.5 km	MPC · JPL
465959	2011 BE_{93}	—	January 28, 2011	Mount Lemmon	Mount Lemmon Survey	·	2.1 km	MPC · JPL
465960	2011 BG_{102}	—	September 28, 2009	Mount Lemmon	Mount Lemmon Survey	NEM	2.2 km	MPC · JPL
465961	2011 BE_{103}	—	April 7, 2007	Mount Lemmon	Mount Lemmon Survey	·	1.3 km	MPC · JPL
465962	2011 BP_{105}	—	February 25, 2007	Kitt Peak	Spacewatch	·	1.6 km	MPC · JPL
465963	2011 BJ_{109}	—	September 18, 2009	Kitt Peak	Spacewatch	·	1.6 km	MPC · JPL
465964	2011 BY_{115}	—	December 5, 2010	Mount Lemmon	Mount Lemmon Survey	·	2.2 km	MPC · JPL
465965	2011 BG_{120}	—	January 29, 2011	Mount Lemmon	Mount Lemmon Survey	·	1.6 km	MPC · JPL
465966	2011 BT_{122}	—	December 2, 2005	Kitt Peak	Spacewatch	·	1.6 km	MPC · JPL
465967	2011 BP_{161}	—	October 27, 2005	Kitt Peak	Spacewatch	·	2.1 km	MPC · JPL
465968	2011 CH_{6}	—	September 16, 2009	Kitt Peak	Spacewatch	·	1.6 km	MPC · JPL
465969	2011 CN_{6}	—	January 11, 2011	Mount Lemmon	Mount Lemmon Survey	·	1.6 km	MPC · JPL
465970	2011 CX_{10}	—	August 7, 2008	Kitt Peak	Spacewatch	·	1.6 km	MPC · JPL
465971	2011 CD_{12}	—	October 18, 2009	Kitt Peak	Spacewatch	AGN	950 m	MPC · JPL
465972	2011 CL_{20}	—	February 21, 2006	Mount Lemmon	Mount Lemmon Survey	·	1.7 km	MPC · JPL
465973	2011 CM_{20}	—	January 16, 2011	Mount Lemmon	Mount Lemmon Survey	·	2.2 km	MPC · JPL
465974	2011 CG_{25}	—	December 10, 2010	Mount Lemmon	Mount Lemmon Survey	·	2.2 km	MPC · JPL
465975	2011 CP_{25}	—	January 24, 2011	Mount Lemmon	Mount Lemmon Survey	·	2.2 km	MPC · JPL
465976	2011 CU_{30}	—	January 16, 2011	Mount Lemmon	Mount Lemmon Survey	·	1.8 km	MPC · JPL
465977	2011 CX_{30}	—	December 8, 2010	Mount Lemmon	Mount Lemmon Survey	·	1.5 km	MPC · JPL
465978	2011 CA_{42}	—	October 18, 2009	Kitt Peak	Spacewatch	AGN	1.1 km	MPC · JPL
465979	2011 CX_{45}	—	March 13, 2007	Kitt Peak	Spacewatch	GEF	1.3 km	MPC · JPL
465980	2011 CF_{52}	—	February 7, 2011	Mount Lemmon	Mount Lemmon Survey	·	1.4 km	MPC · JPL
465981	2011 CO_{57}	—	February 12, 2002	Kitt Peak	Spacewatch	AGN	1 km	MPC · JPL
465982	2011 CQ_{79}	—	November 25, 2009	Mount Lemmon	Mount Lemmon Survey	EOS	2.2 km	MPC · JPL
465983	2011 CG_{84}	—	September 20, 2009	Mount Lemmon	Mount Lemmon Survey	·	1.3 km	MPC · JPL
465984	2011 CY_{89}	—	October 24, 2009	Kitt Peak	Spacewatch	NEM	2.0 km	MPC · JPL
465985	2011 CZ_{101}	—	October 18, 2009	Mount Lemmon	Mount Lemmon Survey	AGN	840 m	MPC · JPL
465986	2011 CW_{110}	—	September 24, 2008	Mount Lemmon	Mount Lemmon Survey	·	1.7 km	MPC · JPL
465987	2011 DS_{2}	—	September 15, 2009	Kitt Peak	Spacewatch	·	1.9 km	MPC · JPL
465988	2011 DL_{14}	—	September 15, 2004	Kitt Peak	Spacewatch	WIT	930 m	MPC · JPL
465989	2011 DD_{27}	—	November 22, 2009	Mount Lemmon	Mount Lemmon Survey	·	1.7 km	MPC · JPL
465990	2011 DA_{29}	—	September 21, 2009	Mount Lemmon	Mount Lemmon Survey	·	1.1 km	MPC · JPL
465991	2011 EG_{1}	—	October 17, 2009	Catalina	CSS	WIT	1.2 km	MPC · JPL
465992	2011 ET_{11}	—	December 27, 2005	Kitt Peak	Spacewatch	·	2.4 km	MPC · JPL
465993	2011 EZ_{52}	—	March 9, 2011	Kitt Peak	Spacewatch	BRA	1.4 km	MPC · JPL
465994	2011 EZ_{69}	—	October 26, 2008	Kitt Peak	Spacewatch	EOS	1.8 km	MPC · JPL
465995	2011 EQ_{77}	—	January 31, 2006	Mount Lemmon	Mount Lemmon Survey	·	1.9 km	MPC · JPL
465996	2011 EO_{83}	—	December 29, 2005	Socorro	LINEAR	·	2.0 km	MPC · JPL
465997	2011 FJ_{34}	—	October 9, 2008	Kitt Peak	Spacewatch	EOS	1.6 km	MPC · JPL
465998	2011 FB_{50}	—	October 15, 2004	Socorro	LINEAR	H	490 m	MPC · JPL
465999	2011 FY_{55}	—	April 14, 2010	WISE	WISE	·	2.7 km	MPC · JPL
466000	2011 FC_{63}	—	October 17, 2003	Kitt Peak	Spacewatch	EOS	2.1 km	MPC · JPL

back to top

== Meaning of names ==
As minor planet discoveries are confirmed, they are given a permanent number by the IAU's Minor Planet Center (MPC), and the discoverers can then submit names for them, following the IAU's naming conventions. The list below concerns those minor planets in the specified number-range that have received names, and explains the meanings of those names.

Official naming citations of newly named small Solar System bodies are approved and published in a bulletin by IAU's Working Group for Small Bodies Nomenclature (WGSBN). Before May 2021, citations were published in MPC's Minor Planet Circulars for many decades. Recent citations can also be found on the JPL Small-Body Database (SBDB). Until his death in 2016, German astronomer Lutz D. Schmadel compiled these citations into the Dictionary of Minor Planet Names (DMP) and regularly updated the collection.

Based on Paul Herget's The Names of the Minor Planets, Schmadel also researched the unclear origin of numerous asteroids, most of which had been named prior to World War II. This article incorporates text from this source, which is in the public domain: SBDB New namings may only be added to this list below after official publication as the preannouncement of names is condemned. The WGSBN publishes a comprehensive guideline for the naming rules of non-cometary small Solar System bodies.

Named minor planet	Provisional	This minor planet was named for...	Ref · Catalog
465036 Tatm	2006 QK_{13}	The Taiwan Agricultural Technical Mission (TATM).	IAU · 465036
465513 Chenchen	2008 UO_{128}	Chen Chen (born 1948) is one of the most famous movie stars in Taiwan. Her acting career started in 1963. Over the years she has acted in more than ninety films. She was awarded Best Actress twice in Asia Film Festival. She received the Golden Horse Life-Achievement Award in 2013.	IAU · 465513; IAU
