= List of minor planets: 441001–442000 =

The following is a partial list of minor planets, running from minor-planet number 441001 through 442000, inclusive. The primary data for this and other partial lists is based on JPL's "Small-Body Orbital Elements" and data available from the Minor Planet Center. Critical list information is also provided by the MPC, unless otherwise specified from Lowell Observatory. A detailed description of the table's columns and additional sources are given on the main page including a complete list of every page in this series, and a statistical break-up on the dynamical classification of minor planets.

Also see the summary list of all named bodies in numerical and alphabetical order, and the corresponding naming citations for the number range of this particular list. New namings may only be added to this list after official publication, as the preannouncement of names is condemned by the Working Group for Small Bodies Nomenclature of the International Astronomical Union.

Near-Earth obj.	MBA (inner)	MBA (outer)	Centaur
Mars-crosser	MBA (middle)	Jupiter trojan	Trans-Neptunian obj.
Unclassified

== 441001–441100 ==
Designation			Discovery			Properties		Ref
Permanent	Provisional	Named after	Date	Site	Discoverer(s)	Category	Diam.	Ref
441001	2007 DO_{49}	—	January 25, 2007	Catalina	CSS	H	400 m	MPC · JPL
441002	2007 DS_{53}	—	February 19, 2007	Mount Lemmon	Mount Lemmon Survey	·	1.0 km	MPC · JPL
441003	2007 DY_{81}	—	February 23, 2007	Kitt Peak	Spacewatch	·	850 m	MPC · JPL
441004	2007 DG_{82}	—	February 17, 2007	Kitt Peak	Spacewatch	·	860 m	MPC · JPL
441005	2007 DA_{93}	—	February 23, 2007	Socorro	LINEAR	·	5.0 km	MPC · JPL
441006	2007 DL_{96}	—	February 23, 2007	Mount Lemmon	Mount Lemmon Survey	·	1.0 km	MPC · JPL
441007	2007 DZ_{98}	—	January 27, 2007	Mount Lemmon	Mount Lemmon Survey	·	790 m	MPC · JPL
441008	2007 DV_{100}	—	February 8, 2007	Kitt Peak	Spacewatch	URS	3.7 km	MPC · JPL
441009	2007 DP_{116}	—	February 16, 2007	Catalina	CSS	·	3.1 km	MPC · JPL
441010	2007 EB_{6}	—	October 28, 2005	Kitt Peak	Spacewatch	·	710 m	MPC · JPL
441011	2007 EX_{12}	—	February 26, 2007	Mount Lemmon	Mount Lemmon Survey	·	700 m	MPC · JPL
441012	2007 EQ_{15}	—	March 9, 2007	Kitt Peak	Spacewatch	MAS	650 m	MPC · JPL
441013	2007 EM_{69}	—	March 10, 2007	Kitt Peak	Spacewatch	·	960 m	MPC · JPL
441014	2007 EK_{72}	—	October 5, 2004	Kitt Peak	Spacewatch	·	3.5 km	MPC · JPL
441015	2007 EM_{82}	—	March 12, 2007	Kitt Peak	Spacewatch	·	1.1 km	MPC · JPL
441016	2007 EY_{83}	—	March 12, 2007	Mount Lemmon	Mount Lemmon Survey	·	3.9 km	MPC · JPL
441017	2007 EG_{115}	—	March 13, 2007	Mount Lemmon	Mount Lemmon Survey	·	840 m	MPC · JPL
441018	2007 EO_{131}	—	March 9, 2007	Mount Lemmon	Mount Lemmon Survey	MAS	670 m	MPC · JPL
441019	2007 EE_{135}	—	January 29, 2007	Kitt Peak	Spacewatch	·	3.0 km	MPC · JPL
441020	2007 EC_{147}	—	February 26, 2007	Mount Lemmon	Mount Lemmon Survey	·	660 m	MPC · JPL
441021	2007 EE_{147}	—	February 26, 2007	Mount Lemmon	Mount Lemmon Survey	·	750 m	MPC · JPL
441022	2007 EM_{160}	—	March 14, 2007	Kitt Peak	Spacewatch	·	1.1 km	MPC · JPL
441023	2007 ET_{170}	—	February 8, 2007	Kitt Peak	Spacewatch	·	3.2 km	MPC · JPL
441024	2007 EX_{173}	—	March 10, 2007	Kitt Peak	Spacewatch	·	1.1 km	MPC · JPL
441025	2007 EN_{185}	—	March 14, 2007	Mount Lemmon	Mount Lemmon Survey	V	670 m	MPC · JPL
441026	2007 EB_{193}	—	March 14, 2007	Socorro	LINEAR	·	3.1 km	MPC · JPL
441027	2007 EN_{196}	—	March 15, 2007	Kitt Peak	Spacewatch	·	830 m	MPC · JPL
441028	2007 EW_{210}	—	March 8, 2007	Palomar	NEAT	·	920 m	MPC · JPL
441029	2007 EX_{217}	—	March 15, 2007	Kitt Peak	Spacewatch	·	1.2 km	MPC · JPL
441030	2007 EB_{221}	—	March 13, 2007	Mount Lemmon	Mount Lemmon Survey	·	1 km	MPC · JPL
441031	2007 FW_{2}	—	March 16, 2007	Catalina	CSS	PHO	980 m	MPC · JPL
441032	2007 FS_{7}	—	March 16, 2007	Mount Lemmon	Mount Lemmon Survey	·	2.6 km	MPC · JPL
441033	2007 FD_{13}	—	March 19, 2007	Catalina	CSS	·	1.2 km	MPC · JPL
441034	2007 FR_{20}	—	March 20, 2007	Purple Mountain	PMO NEO Survey Program	·	980 m	MPC · JPL
441035	2007 FF_{25}	—	March 20, 2007	Kitt Peak	Spacewatch	MAS	650 m	MPC · JPL
441036	2007 GC_{11}	—	April 11, 2007	Kitt Peak	Spacewatch	NYS	1.1 km	MPC · JPL
441037	2007 GG_{21}	—	April 11, 2007	Mount Lemmon	Mount Lemmon Survey	·	1.0 km	MPC · JPL
441038	2007 GW_{21}	—	April 11, 2007	Mount Lemmon	Mount Lemmon Survey	V	600 m	MPC · JPL
441039	2007 GB_{51}	—	April 15, 2007	Kitt Peak	Spacewatch	·	1.0 km	MPC · JPL
441040	2007 GG_{59}	—	April 15, 2007	Kitt Peak	Spacewatch	·	1.1 km	MPC · JPL
441041	2007 GZ_{66}	—	April 15, 2007	Kitt Peak	Spacewatch	CLA	1.6 km	MPC · JPL
441042	2007 HF_{3}	—	March 26, 2007	Mount Lemmon	Mount Lemmon Survey	·	960 m	MPC · JPL
441043	2007 HD_{13}	—	March 29, 2007	Kitt Peak	Spacewatch	NYS	1.3 km	MPC · JPL
441044	2007 HK_{30}	—	April 19, 2007	Mount Lemmon	Mount Lemmon Survey	MAS	630 m	MPC · JPL
441045	2007 HC_{41}	—	April 20, 2007	Socorro	LINEAR	·	1.3 km	MPC · JPL
441046	2007 HM_{45}	—	April 18, 2007	Kitt Peak	Spacewatch	·	1.1 km	MPC · JPL
441047	2007 HH_{64}	—	April 22, 2007	Mount Lemmon	Mount Lemmon Survey	NYS	1.2 km	MPC · JPL
441048	2007 HD_{67}	—	April 22, 2007	Mount Lemmon	Mount Lemmon Survey	·	1.5 km	MPC · JPL
441049	2007 HW_{83}	—	April 11, 2007	Kitt Peak	Spacewatch	·	1.2 km	MPC · JPL
441050	2007 JH_{1}	—	May 7, 2007	Kitt Peak	Spacewatch	MAS	680 m	MPC · JPL
441051	2007 JT_{41}	—	May 11, 2007	Kitt Peak	Spacewatch	MAS	690 m	MPC · JPL
441052	2007 JO_{44}	—	May 11, 2007	Mount Lemmon	Mount Lemmon Survey	·	1.5 km	MPC · JPL
441053	2007 LB_{10}	—	June 9, 2007	Kitt Peak	Spacewatch	·	1.4 km	MPC · JPL
441054	2007 LR_{17}	—	June 10, 2007	Kitt Peak	Spacewatch	PHO	950 m	MPC · JPL
441055	2007 LS_{24}	—	June 14, 2007	Kitt Peak	Spacewatch	NYS	1.1 km	MPC · JPL
441056	2007 LC_{25}	—	April 19, 2007	Mount Lemmon	Mount Lemmon Survey	MAS	640 m	MPC · JPL
441057	2007 PX_{10}	—	August 12, 2007	Altschwendt	W. Ries	·	2.8 km	MPC · JPL
441058	2007 PH_{25}	—	August 12, 2007	Siding Spring	SSS	T_{j} (2.53) · APO +1km	1.7 km	MPC · JPL
441059	2007 PF_{33}	—	August 9, 2007	Socorro	LINEAR	H	630 m	MPC · JPL
441060	2007 PR_{45}	—	August 13, 2007	Siding Spring	SSS	·	1.7 km	MPC · JPL
441061	2007 QX_{13}	—	August 24, 2007	Kitt Peak	Spacewatch	·	1.1 km	MPC · JPL
441062	2007 QV_{14}	—	August 24, 2007	Kitt Peak	Spacewatch	·	790 m	MPC · JPL
441063	2007 RG_{4}	—	September 3, 2007	Catalina	CSS	·	1 km	MPC · JPL
441064	2007 RF_{9}	—	September 7, 2007	La Sagra	OAM	·	910 m	MPC · JPL
441065	2007 RV_{11}	—	September 10, 2007	Dauban	Chante-Perdrix	·	650 m	MPC · JPL
441066	2007 RA_{17}	—	January 27, 2006	Catalina	CSS	H	600 m	MPC · JPL
441067	2007 RN_{30}	—	September 5, 2007	Anderson Mesa	LONEOS	·	2.3 km	MPC · JPL
441068	2007 RF_{34}	—	September 5, 2007	Anderson Mesa	LONEOS	H	640 m	MPC · JPL
441069	2007 RQ_{58}	—	September 10, 2007	Catalina	CSS	·	2.5 km	MPC · JPL
441070	2007 RA_{63}	—	September 10, 2007	Mount Lemmon	Mount Lemmon Survey	·	1.4 km	MPC · JPL
441071	2007 RU_{63}	—	September 10, 2007	Mount Lemmon	Mount Lemmon Survey	·	930 m	MPC · JPL
441072	2007 RX_{64}	—	September 10, 2007	Mount Lemmon	Mount Lemmon Survey	T_{j} (2.98) · 3:2 · SHU	5.1 km	MPC · JPL
441073	2007 RX_{73}	—	September 10, 2007	Mount Lemmon	Mount Lemmon Survey	·	1.3 km	MPC · JPL
441074	2007 RQ_{87}	—	September 10, 2007	Mount Lemmon	Mount Lemmon Survey	·	730 m	MPC · JPL
441075	2007 RQ_{107}	—	September 11, 2007	Mount Lemmon	Mount Lemmon Survey	T_{j} (2.99) · 3:2	5.8 km	MPC · JPL
441076	2007 RO_{111}	—	September 11, 2007	Kitt Peak	Spacewatch	·	1.2 km	MPC · JPL
441077	2007 RC_{132}	—	September 12, 2007	Mount Lemmon	Mount Lemmon Survey	·	980 m	MPC · JPL
441078	2007 RJ_{133}	—	September 15, 2007	Mount Lemmon	Mount Lemmon Survey	H	590 m	MPC · JPL
441079	2007 RY_{152}	—	September 10, 2007	Kitt Peak	Spacewatch	·	1.4 km	MPC · JPL
441080	2007 RP_{155}	—	August 24, 2007	Kitt Peak	Spacewatch	·	1.5 km	MPC · JPL
441081	2007 RS_{171}	—	September 10, 2007	Kitt Peak	Spacewatch	·	830 m	MPC · JPL
441082	2007 RZ_{171}	—	September 10, 2007	Kitt Peak	Spacewatch	·	720 m	MPC · JPL
441083	2007 RZ_{178}	—	September 10, 2007	Kitt Peak	Spacewatch	·	1.1 km	MPC · JPL
441084	2007 RT_{182}	—	September 12, 2007	Kitt Peak	Spacewatch	·	870 m	MPC · JPL
441085	2007 RM_{186}	—	September 13, 2007	Mount Lemmon	Mount Lemmon Survey	·	960 m	MPC · JPL
441086	2007 RK_{188}	—	September 10, 2007	Catalina	CSS	·	1.5 km	MPC · JPL
441087	2007 RJ_{201}	—	October 19, 2003	Kitt Peak	Spacewatch	·	950 m	MPC · JPL
441088	2007 RF_{202}	—	September 13, 2007	Kitt Peak	Spacewatch	·	1.2 km	MPC · JPL
441089	2007 RY_{205}	—	September 10, 2007	Mount Lemmon	Mount Lemmon Survey	·	660 m	MPC · JPL
441090	2007 RA_{216}	—	September 12, 2007	Kitt Peak	Spacewatch	·	1.4 km	MPC · JPL
441091	2007 RT_{221}	—	September 14, 2007	Mount Lemmon	Mount Lemmon Survey	·	870 m	MPC · JPL
441092	2007 RY_{238}	—	December 30, 2000	Socorro	LINEAR	T_{j} (2.95)	5.8 km	MPC · JPL
441093	2007 RR_{240}	—	September 10, 2007	Catalina	CSS	MAR	1.1 km	MPC · JPL
441094	2007 RO_{248}	—	September 13, 2007	Mount Lemmon	Mount Lemmon Survey	·	1.2 km	MPC · JPL
441095	2007 RK_{252}	—	September 13, 2007	Catalina	CSS	·	2.0 km	MPC · JPL
441096	2007 RZ_{280}	—	September 13, 2007	Catalina	CSS	·	1.3 km	MPC · JPL
441097	2007 RL_{281}	—	September 13, 2007	Catalina	CSS	·	1.4 km	MPC · JPL
441098	2007 RT_{312}	—	September 14, 2007	Mount Lemmon	Mount Lemmon Survey	·	1.2 km	MPC · JPL
441099	2007 RK_{321}	—	September 14, 2007	Socorro	LINEAR	·	890 m	MPC · JPL
441100	2007 RF_{325}	—	September 14, 2007	Mount Lemmon	Mount Lemmon Survey	·	1.1 km	MPC · JPL

== 441101–441200 ==
back to top

Designation			Discovery			Properties		Ref
Permanent	Provisional	Named after	Date	Site	Discoverer(s)	Category	Diam.	Ref
441101	2007 SB_{3}	—	September 16, 2007	Socorro	LINEAR	(5)	850 m	MPC · JPL
441102	2007 SD_{5}	—	October 25, 2003	Socorro	LINEAR	·	1.5 km	MPC · JPL
441103	2007 SP_{6}	—	September 21, 2007	Catalina	CSS	AMO +1km · critical	820 m	MPC · JPL
441104	2007 SB_{11}	—	September 21, 2007	Purple Mountain	PMO NEO Survey Program	·	980 m	MPC · JPL
441105	2007 SE_{24}	—	September 26, 2007	Mount Lemmon	Mount Lemmon Survey	·	1.8 km	MPC · JPL
441106	2007 TF_{4}	—	October 6, 2007	La Sagra	OAM	·	1.4 km	MPC · JPL
441107	2007 TG_{5}	—	October 4, 2007	Catalina	CSS	·	750 m	MPC · JPL
441108	2007 TZ_{5}	—	October 6, 2007	Socorro	LINEAR	·	1.1 km	MPC · JPL
441109	2007 TV_{9}	—	October 6, 2007	Socorro	LINEAR	·	1.3 km	MPC · JPL
441110	2007 TC_{12}	—	October 6, 2007	Socorro	LINEAR	·	1.8 km	MPC · JPL
441111	2007 TD_{20}	—	October 20, 2003	Kitt Peak	Spacewatch	(5)	1.0 km	MPC · JPL
441112	2007 TU_{23}	—	October 9, 2007	Socorro	LINEAR	H	610 m	MPC · JPL
441113	2007 TO_{34}	—	September 9, 2007	Mount Lemmon	Mount Lemmon Survey	·	1.5 km	MPC · JPL
441114	2007 TG_{35}	—	September 12, 2007	Mount Lemmon	Mount Lemmon Survey	·	1.1 km	MPC · JPL
441115	2007 TX_{36}	—	October 4, 2007	Kitt Peak	Spacewatch	·	800 m	MPC · JPL
441116	2007 TL_{38}	—	October 4, 2007	Catalina	CSS	·	1.5 km	MPC · JPL
441117	2007 TT_{43}	—	October 7, 2007	Kitt Peak	Spacewatch	JUN	1.1 km	MPC · JPL
441118	2007 TD_{46}	—	October 7, 2007	Kitt Peak	Spacewatch	(5)	1.2 km	MPC · JPL
441119	2007 TV_{48}	—	September 14, 2007	Mount Lemmon	Mount Lemmon Survey	·	1.1 km	MPC · JPL
441120	2007 TL_{56}	—	October 4, 2007	Kitt Peak	Spacewatch	·	960 m	MPC · JPL
441121	2007 TL_{62}	—	October 7, 2007	Mount Lemmon	Mount Lemmon Survey	·	970 m	MPC · JPL
441122	2007 TK_{64}	—	September 15, 2007	Mount Lemmon	Mount Lemmon Survey	·	1.3 km	MPC · JPL
441123	2007 TK_{76}	—	August 24, 2007	Kitt Peak	Spacewatch	·	1.2 km	MPC · JPL
441124	2007 TN_{76}	—	September 11, 2007	Mount Lemmon	Mount Lemmon Survey	(5)	910 m	MPC · JPL
441125	2007 TJ_{78}	—	October 5, 2007	Kitt Peak	Spacewatch	·	1.2 km	MPC · JPL
441126	2007 TU_{86}	—	October 8, 2007	Mount Lemmon	Mount Lemmon Survey	·	940 m	MPC · JPL
441127	2007 TW_{86}	—	October 8, 2007	Mount Lemmon	Mount Lemmon Survey	MIS	2.3 km	MPC · JPL
441128	2007 TB_{88}	—	October 8, 2007	Mount Lemmon	Mount Lemmon Survey	·	960 m	MPC · JPL
441129	2007 TM_{93}	—	September 12, 2007	Mount Lemmon	Mount Lemmon Survey	·	920 m	MPC · JPL
441130	2007 TG_{95}	—	December 12, 1999	Kitt Peak	Spacewatch	·	1.1 km	MPC · JPL
441131	2007 TG_{108}	—	September 9, 2007	Kitt Peak	Spacewatch	·	2.1 km	MPC · JPL
441132	2007 TN_{111}	—	October 8, 2007	Catalina	CSS	·	820 m	MPC · JPL
441133	2007 TZ_{114}	—	November 21, 2003	Kitt Peak	Spacewatch	·	790 m	MPC · JPL
441134	2007 TM_{121}	—	October 6, 2007	Kitt Peak	Spacewatch	3:2	4.7 km	MPC · JPL
441135	2007 TP_{125}	—	October 6, 2007	Kitt Peak	Spacewatch	·	1.4 km	MPC · JPL
441136	2007 TA_{129}	—	October 6, 2007	Kitt Peak	Spacewatch	·	1.1 km	MPC · JPL
441137	2007 TC_{132}	—	October 7, 2007	Mount Lemmon	Mount Lemmon Survey	·	900 m	MPC · JPL
441138	2007 TS_{138}	—	October 9, 2007	Catalina	CSS	·	1.5 km	MPC · JPL
441139	2007 TG_{142}	—	September 11, 2007	Catalina	CSS	·	1.3 km	MPC · JPL
441140	2007 TC_{143}	—	October 15, 2007	Siding Spring	SSS	·	2.2 km	MPC · JPL
441141	2007 TO_{146}	—	October 8, 2007	XuYi	PMO NEO Survey Program	·	1.1 km	MPC · JPL
441142	2007 TV_{148}	—	September 11, 2007	Mount Lemmon	Mount Lemmon Survey	·	2.0 km	MPC · JPL
441143	2007 TO_{170}	—	October 12, 2007	Socorro	LINEAR	·	1.0 km	MPC · JPL
441144	2007 TV_{180}	—	October 8, 2007	Anderson Mesa	LONEOS	·	870 m	MPC · JPL
441145	2007 TM_{194}	—	October 7, 2007	Mount Lemmon	Mount Lemmon Survey	·	1.1 km	MPC · JPL
441146	2007 TU_{197}	—	September 14, 2007	Mount Lemmon	Mount Lemmon Survey	·	1.7 km	MPC · JPL
441147	2007 TT_{200}	—	October 4, 2007	Kitt Peak	Spacewatch	·	690 m	MPC · JPL
441148	2007 TE_{201}	—	October 8, 2007	Kitt Peak	Spacewatch	·	1.1 km	MPC · JPL
441149	2007 TT_{204}	—	October 8, 2007	Mount Lemmon	Mount Lemmon Survey	·	1.5 km	MPC · JPL
441150	2007 TZ_{207}	—	October 10, 2007	Catalina	CSS	·	1.8 km	MPC · JPL
441151	2007 TC_{218}	—	September 14, 2007	Mount Lemmon	Mount Lemmon Survey	(5)	1.1 km	MPC · JPL
441152	2007 TV_{221}	—	October 9, 2007	Kitt Peak	Spacewatch	critical	630 m	MPC · JPL
441153	2007 TD_{222}	—	October 9, 2007	Kitt Peak	Spacewatch	·	1.1 km	MPC · JPL
441154	2007 TU_{226}	—	October 8, 2007	Kitt Peak	Spacewatch	·	980 m	MPC · JPL
441155	2007 TZ_{226}	—	October 8, 2007	Kitt Peak	Spacewatch	MAR	1.1 km	MPC · JPL
441156	2007 TR_{229}	—	October 8, 2007	Kitt Peak	Spacewatch	·	1.4 km	MPC · JPL
441157	2007 TY_{232}	—	October 8, 2007	Kitt Peak	Spacewatch	·	1.2 km	MPC · JPL
441158	2007 TM_{238}	—	October 10, 2007	Anderson Mesa	LONEOS	(5)	1.2 km	MPC · JPL
441159	2007 TC_{248}	—	September 18, 2007	Catalina	CSS	·	1.1 km	MPC · JPL
441160	2007 TN_{262}	—	October 10, 2007	Kitt Peak	Spacewatch	JUN	1 km	MPC · JPL
441161	2007 TG_{271}	—	October 9, 2007	Kitt Peak	Spacewatch	·	1.2 km	MPC · JPL
441162	2007 TB_{275}	—	October 11, 2007	Catalina	CSS	(5)	1.2 km	MPC · JPL
441163	2007 TX_{277}	—	October 11, 2007	Mount Lemmon	Mount Lemmon Survey	(5)	890 m	MPC · JPL
441164	2007 TK_{278}	—	October 11, 2007	Mount Lemmon	Mount Lemmon Survey	·	1.6 km	MPC · JPL
441165	2007 TD_{286}	—	October 9, 2007	Mount Lemmon	Mount Lemmon Survey	·	970 m	MPC · JPL
441166	2007 TQ_{312}	—	October 11, 2007	Mount Lemmon	Mount Lemmon Survey	(5)	1.1 km	MPC · JPL
441167	2007 TB_{316}	—	October 12, 2007	Kitt Peak	Spacewatch	·	1.2 km	MPC · JPL
441168	2007 TE_{319}	—	October 12, 2007	Kitt Peak	Spacewatch	·	1.0 km	MPC · JPL
441169	2007 TZ_{330}	—	October 11, 2007	Kitt Peak	Spacewatch	(5)	1.0 km	MPC · JPL
441170	2007 TX_{332}	—	October 11, 2007	Kitt Peak	Spacewatch	·	810 m	MPC · JPL
441171	2007 TF_{350}	—	October 14, 2007	Mount Lemmon	Mount Lemmon Survey	(5)	1.0 km	MPC · JPL
441172	2007 TD_{365}	—	September 20, 2007	Catalina	CSS	·	1.4 km	MPC · JPL
441173	2007 TG_{367}	—	September 26, 2007	Mount Lemmon	Mount Lemmon Survey	·	1.1 km	MPC · JPL
441174	2007 TZ_{377}	—	October 12, 2007	Catalina	CSS	·	1.2 km	MPC · JPL
441175	2007 TY_{387}	—	October 13, 2007	Mount Lemmon	Mount Lemmon Survey	(5)	1.1 km	MPC · JPL
441176	2007 TX_{395}	—	October 11, 2007	Kitt Peak	Spacewatch	·	1.8 km	MPC · JPL
441177	2007 TM_{403}	—	October 15, 2007	Kitt Peak	Spacewatch	(5)	1.2 km	MPC · JPL
441178	2007 TK_{411}	—	October 13, 2007	Catalina	CSS	H	580 m	MPC · JPL
441179	2007 TH_{412}	—	October 14, 2007	Catalina	CSS	RAF	890 m	MPC · JPL
441180	2007 TW_{423}	—	October 7, 2007	Mount Lemmon	Mount Lemmon Survey	·	1.2 km	MPC · JPL
441181	2007 TF_{424}	—	October 7, 2007	Mount Lemmon	Mount Lemmon Survey	·	1.1 km	MPC · JPL
441182	2007 TD_{425}	—	October 8, 2007	Catalina	CSS	·	870 m	MPC · JPL
441183	2007 TC_{427}	—	October 10, 2007	Kitt Peak	Spacewatch	(5)	1 km	MPC · JPL
441184	2007 TB_{429}	—	October 12, 2007	Kitt Peak	Spacewatch	·	1.4 km	MPC · JPL
441185	2007 TO_{430}	—	October 12, 2007	Mount Lemmon	Mount Lemmon Survey	NEM	1.9 km	MPC · JPL
441186	2007 TO_{434}	—	October 10, 2007	Catalina	CSS	T_{j} (2.98) · 3:2	5.0 km	MPC · JPL
441187	2007 TW_{438}	—	October 11, 2007	Kitt Peak	Spacewatch	·	890 m	MPC · JPL
441188	2007 TC_{441}	—	October 10, 2007	Catalina	CSS	·	1.6 km	MPC · JPL
441189	2007 TN_{444}	—	October 8, 2007	Anderson Mesa	LONEOS	·	910 m	MPC · JPL
441190	2007 TD_{453}	—	October 15, 2007	Mount Lemmon	Mount Lemmon Survey	·	2.0 km	MPC · JPL
441191	2007 UC_{7}	—	October 16, 2007	Catalina	CSS	(194)	3.7 km	MPC · JPL
441192	2007 UR_{7}	—	September 15, 2007	Catalina	CSS	·	1.6 km	MPC · JPL
441193	2007 UQ_{8}	—	September 20, 2007	Catalina	CSS	·	1.4 km	MPC · JPL
441194	2007 UU_{15}	—	September 9, 2007	Mount Lemmon	Mount Lemmon Survey	·	1.1 km	MPC · JPL
441195	2007 UL_{21}	—	October 8, 2007	Kitt Peak	Spacewatch	·	1.2 km	MPC · JPL
441196	2007 UO_{42}	—	October 7, 2007	Kitt Peak	Spacewatch	·	1.3 km	MPC · JPL
441197	2007 UZ_{58}	—	October 10, 2007	Kitt Peak	Spacewatch	·	1.0 km	MPC · JPL
441198	2007 UL_{62}	—	October 30, 2007	Mount Lemmon	Mount Lemmon Survey	(5)	980 m	MPC · JPL
441199	2007 UU_{64}	—	October 30, 2007	Mount Lemmon	Mount Lemmon Survey	·	1.7 km	MPC · JPL
441200	2007 UB_{68}	—	October 30, 2007	Catalina	CSS	(5)	1.1 km	MPC · JPL

== 441201–441300 ==
back to top

Designation			Discovery			Properties		Ref
Permanent	Provisional	Named after	Date	Site	Discoverer(s)	Category	Diam.	Ref
441201	2007 UK_{77}	—	October 10, 2007	Catalina	CSS	BRG	1.4 km	MPC · JPL
441202	2007 UB_{82}	—	October 30, 2007	Kitt Peak	Spacewatch	·	970 m	MPC · JPL
441203	2007 UT_{83}	—	October 30, 2007	Kitt Peak	Spacewatch	·	1.1 km	MPC · JPL
441204	2007 UG_{88}	—	October 30, 2007	Kitt Peak	Spacewatch	·	2.3 km	MPC · JPL
441205	2007 UR_{91}	—	October 9, 2007	Mount Lemmon	Mount Lemmon Survey	·	1.2 km	MPC · JPL
441206	2007 UU_{103}	—	October 20, 2007	Mount Lemmon	Mount Lemmon Survey	AGN	1.6 km	MPC · JPL
441207	2007 UM_{106}	—	October 31, 2007	Mount Lemmon	Mount Lemmon Survey	·	1.3 km	MPC · JPL
441208	2007 UH_{123}	—	October 31, 2007	Catalina	CSS	·	1.2 km	MPC · JPL
441209	2007 UU_{131}	—	October 17, 2007	Mount Lemmon	Mount Lemmon Survey	·	1.2 km	MPC · JPL
441210	2007 VX_{5}	—	October 14, 2007	Mount Lemmon	Mount Lemmon Survey	·	1.3 km	MPC · JPL
441211	2007 VX_{10}	—	November 1, 2007	Kitt Peak	Spacewatch	·	1.3 km	MPC · JPL
441212	2007 VZ_{10}	—	November 1, 2007	Kitt Peak	Spacewatch	·	1.1 km	MPC · JPL
441213	2007 VC_{12}	—	October 21, 2007	Mount Lemmon	Mount Lemmon Survey	·	1.9 km	MPC · JPL
441214	2007 VS_{40}	—	October 8, 2007	Mount Lemmon	Mount Lemmon Survey	·	1.4 km	MPC · JPL
441215	2007 VP_{42}	—	November 3, 2007	Mount Lemmon	Mount Lemmon Survey	526	2.0 km	MPC · JPL
441216	2007 VL_{45}	—	October 16, 2007	Mount Lemmon	Mount Lemmon Survey	·	970 m	MPC · JPL
441217	2007 VN_{46}	—	November 1, 2007	Kitt Peak	Spacewatch	(5)	970 m	MPC · JPL
441218	2007 VU_{46}	—	October 9, 2007	Kitt Peak	Spacewatch	·	1.7 km	MPC · JPL
441219	2007 VN_{56}	—	November 1, 2007	Kitt Peak	Spacewatch	·	1.5 km	MPC · JPL
441220	2007 VL_{63}	—	November 1, 2007	Kitt Peak	Spacewatch	H	490 m	MPC · JPL
441221	2007 VK_{72}	—	October 14, 2007	Mount Lemmon	Mount Lemmon Survey	·	1.7 km	MPC · JPL
441222	2007 VL_{72}	—	November 1, 2007	Kitt Peak	Spacewatch	·	1.1 km	MPC · JPL
441223	2007 VW_{79}	—	November 3, 2007	Kitt Peak	Spacewatch	·	1.2 km	MPC · JPL
441224	2007 VH_{84}	—	October 15, 2007	Kitt Peak	Spacewatch	·	1.4 km	MPC · JPL
441225	2007 VA_{87}	—	November 5, 2007	Kitt Peak	Spacewatch	·	1.5 km	MPC · JPL
441226	2007 VS_{111}	—	October 16, 2007	Mount Lemmon	Mount Lemmon Survey	·	2.2 km	MPC · JPL
441227	2007 VN_{112}	—	November 3, 2007	Kitt Peak	Spacewatch	AST	1.6 km	MPC · JPL
441228	2007 VM_{117}	—	October 30, 2007	Catalina	CSS	·	2.0 km	MPC · JPL
441229	2007 VE_{125}	—	November 5, 2007	XuYi	PMO NEO Survey Program	BRG	1.5 km	MPC · JPL
441230	2007 VN_{126}	—	October 15, 2007	Kitt Peak	Spacewatch	·	1.2 km	MPC · JPL
441231	2007 VJ_{160}	—	October 20, 2007	Mount Lemmon	Mount Lemmon Survey	(5)	1.1 km	MPC · JPL
441232	2007 VT_{162}	—	January 16, 2004	Kitt Peak	Spacewatch	·	1.2 km	MPC · JPL
441233	2007 VF_{163}	—	November 5, 2007	Kitt Peak	Spacewatch	·	1.4 km	MPC · JPL
441234	2007 VV_{167}	—	November 5, 2007	Kitt Peak	Spacewatch	·	1.5 km	MPC · JPL
441235	2007 VH_{188}	—	October 31, 2007	Mount Lemmon	Mount Lemmon Survey	·	1.5 km	MPC · JPL
441236	2007 VN_{188}	—	November 2, 2007	Kitt Peak	Spacewatch	MIS	2.3 km	MPC · JPL
441237	2007 VS_{208}	—	November 11, 2007	Mount Lemmon	Mount Lemmon Survey	·	2.5 km	MPC · JPL
441238	2007 VF_{214}	—	November 9, 2007	Kitt Peak	Spacewatch	·	1.6 km	MPC · JPL
441239	2007 VA_{220}	—	November 9, 2007	Kitt Peak	Spacewatch	·	1.8 km	MPC · JPL
441240	2007 VK_{221}	—	November 12, 2007	Mount Lemmon	Mount Lemmon Survey	MIS	1.9 km	MPC · JPL
441241	2007 VS_{221}	—	November 15, 2007	Mayhill	Lowe, A.	·	1.1 km	MPC · JPL
441242	2007 VW_{223}	—	November 7, 2007	Catalina	CSS	·	1.1 km	MPC · JPL
441243	2007 VJ_{233}	—	November 8, 2007	Kitt Peak	Spacewatch	·	1.4 km	MPC · JPL
441244	2007 VS_{240}	—	November 2, 2007	Catalina	CSS	EUN	1.4 km	MPC · JPL
441245	2007 VW_{240}	—	November 3, 2007	Catalina	CSS	·	1.2 km	MPC · JPL
441246	2007 VV_{246}	—	November 9, 2007	Mount Lemmon	Mount Lemmon Survey	EUN	1.2 km	MPC · JPL
441247	2007 VU_{250}	—	November 9, 2007	Catalina	CSS	·	2.3 km	MPC · JPL
441248	2007 VA_{252}	—	October 10, 2007	Kitt Peak	Spacewatch	·	1.3 km	MPC · JPL
441249	2007 VW_{252}	—	November 13, 2007	Mount Lemmon	Mount Lemmon Survey	·	1.4 km	MPC · JPL
441250	2007 VY_{255}	—	October 16, 2007	Mount Lemmon	Mount Lemmon Survey	·	1.2 km	MPC · JPL
441251	2007 VF_{264}	—	November 5, 2007	Kitt Peak	Spacewatch	(5)	1.3 km	MPC · JPL
441252	2007 VO_{266}	—	November 13, 2007	Kitt Peak	Spacewatch	·	1.9 km	MPC · JPL
441253	2007 VX_{268}	—	November 12, 2007	Socorro	LINEAR	·	1.6 km	MPC · JPL
441254	2007 VZ_{275}	—	November 9, 2007	Kitt Peak	Spacewatch	·	1.7 km	MPC · JPL
441255	2007 VG_{280}	—	November 3, 2007	Kitt Peak	Spacewatch	·	990 m	MPC · JPL
441256	2007 VY_{287}	—	November 12, 2007	Mount Lemmon	Mount Lemmon Survey	WIT	890 m	MPC · JPL
441257	2007 VY_{292}	—	October 17, 2007	Catalina	CSS	·	2.0 km	MPC · JPL
441258	2007 VR_{300}	—	November 9, 2007	Catalina	CSS	·	1.3 km	MPC · JPL
441259	2007 VP_{303}	—	October 9, 2007	Catalina	CSS	·	1.6 km	MPC · JPL
441260	2007 VD_{309}	—	November 9, 2007	Mount Lemmon	Mount Lemmon Survey	·	1.5 km	MPC · JPL
441261	2007 VG_{309}	—	November 9, 2007	Mount Lemmon	Mount Lemmon Survey	(5)	980 m	MPC · JPL
441262	2007 VL_{311}	—	November 8, 2007	Kitt Peak	Spacewatch	(1547)	1.6 km	MPC · JPL
441263	2007 VE_{312}	—	November 2, 2007	Kitt Peak	Spacewatch	·	2.0 km	MPC · JPL
441264	2007 VP_{314}	—	November 2, 2007	Mount Lemmon	Mount Lemmon Survey	·	1.6 km	MPC · JPL
441265	2007 VF_{315}	—	November 5, 2007	Kitt Peak	Spacewatch	ADE	1.5 km	MPC · JPL
441266	2007 VE_{323}	—	November 8, 2007	Socorro	LINEAR	·	1.7 km	MPC · JPL
441267	2007 VH_{328}	—	November 8, 2007	Socorro	LINEAR	ADE	1.8 km	MPC · JPL
441268	2007 VA_{329}	—	November 12, 2007	Socorro	LINEAR	ADE	1.8 km	MPC · JPL
441269	2007 VB_{330}	—	November 2, 2007	Mount Lemmon	Mount Lemmon Survey	·	3.4 km	MPC · JPL
441270	2007 VE_{330}	—	November 3, 2007	Socorro	LINEAR	·	3.8 km	MPC · JPL
441271	2007 VL_{333}	—	November 15, 2007	Catalina	CSS	·	1.5 km	MPC · JPL
441272	2007 VB_{334}	—	November 12, 2007	Mount Lemmon	Mount Lemmon Survey	·	1.7 km	MPC · JPL
441273	2007 WF_{1}	—	October 11, 2007	Kitt Peak	Spacewatch	·	1.2 km	MPC · JPL
441274	2007 WJ_{6}	—	November 17, 2007	Socorro	LINEAR	(194)	2.3 km	MPC · JPL
441275	2007 WF_{7}	—	September 15, 2007	Mount Lemmon	Mount Lemmon Survey	·	1.2 km	MPC · JPL
441276	2007 WR_{12}	—	November 6, 2007	Mount Lemmon	Mount Lemmon Survey	·	1.5 km	MPC · JPL
441277	2007 WK_{29}	—	November 19, 2007	Kitt Peak	Spacewatch	·	1.9 km	MPC · JPL
441278	2007 WB_{44}	—	November 19, 2007	Mount Lemmon	Mount Lemmon Survey	·	2.2 km	MPC · JPL
441279	2007 WL_{58}	—	November 17, 2007	Kitt Peak	Spacewatch	WIT	1.1 km	MPC · JPL
441280	2007 XK_{6}	—	November 9, 2007	Catalina	CSS	·	1.4 km	MPC · JPL
441281	2007 XQ_{11}	—	November 8, 2007	Kitt Peak	Spacewatch	·	1.3 km	MPC · JPL
441282	2007 XY_{11}	—	October 8, 2007	Kitt Peak	Spacewatch	·	1.9 km	MPC · JPL
441283	2007 XL_{16}	—	August 10, 2007	Kitt Peak	Spacewatch	·	1.7 km	MPC · JPL
441284	2007 XJ_{17}	—	November 5, 2007	Mount Lemmon	Mount Lemmon Survey	·	2.1 km	MPC · JPL
441285	2007 XO_{19}	—	December 12, 2007	Socorro	LINEAR	·	3.7 km	MPC · JPL
441286	2007 XZ_{31}	—	November 8, 2007	Kitt Peak	Spacewatch	·	2.4 km	MPC · JPL
441287	2007 XX_{33}	—	December 10, 2007	Socorro	LINEAR	(5)	1.2 km	MPC · JPL
441288	2007 XP_{39}	—	November 14, 2007	Mount Lemmon	Mount Lemmon Survey	·	1.6 km	MPC · JPL
441289	2007 XH_{53}	—	October 15, 1998	Kitt Peak	Spacewatch	·	1.1 km	MPC · JPL
441290	2007 XC_{56}	—	December 5, 2007	Anderson Mesa	LONEOS	JUN	1.2 km	MPC · JPL
441291	2007 YY_{4}	—	December 16, 2007	Catalina	CSS	·	1.8 km	MPC · JPL
441292	2007 YM_{13}	—	November 7, 2007	Mount Lemmon	Mount Lemmon Survey	·	1.9 km	MPC · JPL
441293	2007 YZ_{14}	—	December 16, 2007	Socorro	LINEAR	·	2.4 km	MPC · JPL
441294	2007 YO_{15}	—	December 16, 2007	Kitt Peak	Spacewatch	·	1.6 km	MPC · JPL
441295	2007 YG_{35}	—	December 30, 2007	Mount Lemmon	Mount Lemmon Survey	·	1.6 km	MPC · JPL
441296	2007 YV_{38}	—	December 30, 2007	Catalina	CSS	NEM	2.3 km	MPC · JPL
441297	2007 YL_{40}	—	December 5, 2007	Kitt Peak	Spacewatch	·	1.6 km	MPC · JPL
441298	2007 YP_{53}	—	December 30, 2007	Catalina	CSS	·	1.8 km	MPC · JPL
441299	2007 YB_{55}	—	December 31, 2007	Kitt Peak	Spacewatch	·	2.0 km	MPC · JPL
441300	2007 YC_{57}	—	December 30, 2007	Kitt Peak	Spacewatch	·	2.1 km	MPC · JPL

== 441301–441400 ==
back to top

Designation			Discovery			Properties		Ref
Permanent	Provisional	Named after	Date	Site	Discoverer(s)	Category	Diam.	Ref
441301	2007 YC_{63}	—	December 31, 2007	Mount Lemmon	Mount Lemmon Survey	EOS	2.0 km	MPC · JPL
441302	2007 YG_{72}	—	November 11, 2007	Mount Lemmon	Mount Lemmon Survey	ADE	2.2 km	MPC · JPL
441303	2008 AL_{4}	—	January 9, 2008	Lulin	LUSS	·	1.6 km	MPC · JPL
441304	2008 AU_{26}	—	December 30, 2007	Mount Lemmon	Mount Lemmon Survey	AMO	220 m	MPC · JPL
441305	2008 AG_{38}	—	January 10, 2008	Mount Lemmon	Mount Lemmon Survey	DOR	1.8 km	MPC · JPL
441306	2008 AK_{39}	—	January 10, 2008	Mount Lemmon	Mount Lemmon Survey	·	1.8 km	MPC · JPL
441307	2008 AA_{41}	—	January 10, 2008	Mount Lemmon	Mount Lemmon Survey	·	2.8 km	MPC · JPL
441308	2008 AS_{52}	—	December 30, 2007	Kitt Peak	Spacewatch	·	2.0 km	MPC · JPL
441309	2008 AO_{59}	—	November 11, 2007	Mount Lemmon	Mount Lemmon Survey	·	2.1 km	MPC · JPL
441310	2008 AQ_{67}	—	January 11, 2008	Kitt Peak	Spacewatch	·	1.7 km	MPC · JPL
441311	2008 AM_{72}	—	December 30, 2007	Catalina	CSS	T_{j} (2.99)	4.9 km	MPC · JPL
441312	2008 AZ_{76}	—	January 12, 2008	Kitt Peak	Spacewatch	·	1.8 km	MPC · JPL
441313	2008 AX_{83}	—	January 15, 2008	Mount Lemmon	Mount Lemmon Survey	·	1.3 km	MPC · JPL
441314	2008 AG_{91}	—	January 13, 2008	Kitt Peak	Spacewatch	·	1.7 km	MPC · JPL
441315	2008 AJ_{91}	—	December 4, 2007	Mount Lemmon	Mount Lemmon Survey	AGN	1.1 km	MPC · JPL
441316	2008 AV_{125}	—	January 6, 2008	Mauna Kea	P. A. Wiegert	DOR	1.8 km	MPC · JPL
441317	2008 AF_{127}	—	January 1, 2008	Mount Lemmon	Mount Lemmon Survey	·	3.6 km	MPC · JPL
441318	2008 AJ_{134}	—	January 1, 2008	Kitt Peak	Spacewatch	·	1.4 km	MPC · JPL
441319	2008 AH_{136}	—	January 19, 2008	Mount Lemmon	Mount Lemmon Survey	·	1.9 km	MPC · JPL
441320	2008 AF_{138}	—	January 15, 2008	Mount Lemmon	Mount Lemmon Survey	·	2.0 km	MPC · JPL
441321	2008 BE_{4}	—	December 18, 2007	Mount Lemmon	Mount Lemmon Survey	BRA	1.3 km	MPC · JPL
441322	2008 BK_{39}	—	January 30, 2008	Catalina	CSS	·	1.8 km	MPC · JPL
441323	2008 BK_{50}	—	December 16, 2007	Catalina	CSS	·	2.1 km	MPC · JPL
441324	2008 CR_{3}	—	February 2, 2008	Kitt Peak	Spacewatch	·	2.0 km	MPC · JPL
441325	2008 CO_{8}	—	December 4, 2007	Catalina	CSS	·	2.8 km	MPC · JPL
441326	2008 CE_{36}	—	February 2, 2008	Kitt Peak	Spacewatch	EOS	1.8 km	MPC · JPL
441327	2008 CQ_{55}	—	November 18, 2007	Mount Lemmon	Mount Lemmon Survey	·	2.0 km	MPC · JPL
441328	2008 CE_{61}	—	February 7, 2008	Mount Lemmon	Mount Lemmon Survey	·	1.9 km	MPC · JPL
441329	2008 CJ_{61}	—	February 7, 2008	Mount Lemmon	Mount Lemmon Survey	BRA	1.3 km	MPC · JPL
441330	2008 CL_{79}	—	February 7, 2008	Kitt Peak	Spacewatch	·	1.7 km	MPC · JPL
441331	2008 CQ_{84}	—	February 7, 2008	Mount Lemmon	Mount Lemmon Survey	JUN	1.0 km	MPC · JPL
441332	2008 CA_{110}	—	February 9, 2008	Kitt Peak	Spacewatch	·	3.3 km	MPC · JPL
441333	2008 CB_{120}	—	February 2, 2008	Mount Lemmon	Mount Lemmon Survey	EOS	1.6 km	MPC · JPL
441334	2008 CC_{120}	—	February 11, 2008	Dauban	Kugel, F.	·	1.6 km	MPC · JPL
441335	2008 CG_{125}	—	December 30, 2007	Mount Lemmon	Mount Lemmon Survey	·	2.6 km	MPC · JPL
441336	2008 CM_{130}	—	February 8, 2008	Kitt Peak	Spacewatch	·	2.3 km	MPC · JPL
441337	2008 CZ_{132}	—	January 30, 2008	Mount Lemmon	Mount Lemmon Survey	·	3.1 km	MPC · JPL
441338	2008 CD_{137}	—	February 8, 2008	Mount Lemmon	Mount Lemmon Survey	·	2.3 km	MPC · JPL
441339	2008 CT_{138}	—	February 8, 2008	Kitt Peak	Spacewatch	·	2.6 km	MPC · JPL
441340	2008 CG_{141}	—	February 8, 2008	Kitt Peak	Spacewatch	·	4.1 km	MPC · JPL
441341	2008 CA_{150}	—	February 2, 2008	Kitt Peak	Spacewatch	·	3.0 km	MPC · JPL
441342	2008 CD_{152}	—	February 9, 2008	Kitt Peak	Spacewatch	·	3.2 km	MPC · JPL
441343	2008 CM_{155}	—	February 9, 2008	Mount Lemmon	Mount Lemmon Survey	(16286)	2.0 km	MPC · JPL
441344	2008 CD_{191}	—	February 2, 2008	Kitt Peak	Spacewatch	·	1.2 km	MPC · JPL
441345	2008 CH_{192}	—	February 2, 2008	Kitt Peak	Spacewatch	THB	2.5 km	MPC · JPL
441346	2008 CS_{199}	—	September 14, 2005	Kitt Peak	Spacewatch	·	1.8 km	MPC · JPL
441347	2008 CL_{206}	—	February 8, 2008	Kitt Peak	Spacewatch	·	2.0 km	MPC · JPL
441348	2008 CO_{210}	—	February 2, 2008	Socorro	LINEAR	·	3.0 km	MPC · JPL
441349	2008 CG_{212}	—	February 7, 2008	Mount Lemmon	Mount Lemmon Survey	·	2.3 km	MPC · JPL
441350	2008 DL_{3}	—	February 2, 2008	Kitt Peak	Spacewatch	·	2.2 km	MPC · JPL
441351	2008 DR_{4}	—	February 26, 2008	Bisei SG Center	BATTeRS	·	5.1 km	MPC · JPL
441352	2008 DS_{5}	—	January 11, 1999	Kitt Peak	Spacewatch	·	2.4 km	MPC · JPL
441353	2008 DG_{14}	—	February 7, 2008	Kitt Peak	Spacewatch	·	2.2 km	MPC · JPL
441354	2008 DL_{17}	—	February 24, 2008	Kitt Peak	Spacewatch	·	2.5 km	MPC · JPL
441355	2008 DD_{34}	—	February 11, 2008	Kitt Peak	Spacewatch	·	3.3 km	MPC · JPL
441356	2008 DF_{39}	—	February 10, 2008	Mount Lemmon	Mount Lemmon Survey	·	3.2 km	MPC · JPL
441357	2008 DF_{52}	—	February 29, 2008	Mount Lemmon	Mount Lemmon Survey	·	3.5 km	MPC · JPL
441358	2008 DC_{63}	—	February 28, 2008	Mount Lemmon	Mount Lemmon Survey	NEM	2.6 km	MPC · JPL
441359	2008 DH_{72}	—	February 12, 2008	Kitt Peak	Spacewatch	EOS	1.9 km	MPC · JPL
441360	2008 DV_{75}	—	February 28, 2008	Mount Lemmon	Mount Lemmon Survey	·	1.8 km	MPC · JPL
441361	2008 DR_{77}	—	February 28, 2008	Mount Lemmon	Mount Lemmon Survey	·	3.8 km	MPC · JPL
441362	2008 DC_{79}	—	February 10, 2008	Mount Lemmon	Mount Lemmon Survey	·	2.0 km	MPC · JPL
441363	2008 DC_{81}	—	February 26, 2008	Mount Lemmon	Mount Lemmon Survey	BRA	1.7 km	MPC · JPL
441364	2008 DY_{81}	—	February 28, 2008	Kitt Peak	Spacewatch	THB	3.2 km	MPC · JPL
441365	2008 DK_{86}	—	February 28, 2008	Mount Lemmon	Mount Lemmon Survey	·	1.9 km	MPC · JPL
441366	2008 DN_{86}	—	February 29, 2008	Kitt Peak	Spacewatch	·	2.5 km	MPC · JPL
441367	2008 EN_{5}	—	January 30, 2008	Kitt Peak	Spacewatch	·	4.0 km	MPC · JPL
441368	2008 EB_{11}	—	March 1, 2008	Kitt Peak	Spacewatch	HYG	2.5 km	MPC · JPL
441369	2008 EH_{11}	—	March 1, 2008	Kitt Peak	Spacewatch	EOS	2.0 km	MPC · JPL
441370	2008 EP_{17}	—	March 1, 2008	Kitt Peak	Spacewatch	·	2.3 km	MPC · JPL
441371	2008 EH_{21}	—	March 2, 2008	Kitt Peak	Spacewatch	·	690 m	MPC · JPL
441372	2008 EJ_{25}	—	February 12, 2008	Mount Lemmon	Mount Lemmon Survey	EOS	2.5 km	MPC · JPL
441373	2008 EW_{34}	—	March 2, 2008	Kitt Peak	Spacewatch	·	3.1 km	MPC · JPL
441374 Wangjingxiu	2008 EL_{43}	Wangjingxiu	March 4, 2008	XuYi	PMO NEO Survey Program	·	3.5 km	MPC · JPL
441375	2008 ET_{59}	—	March 8, 2008	Kitt Peak	Spacewatch	·	2.8 km	MPC · JPL
441376	2008 EG_{62}	—	March 9, 2008	Mount Lemmon	Mount Lemmon Survey	·	2.2 km	MPC · JPL
441377	2008 EU_{64}	—	March 9, 2008	Mount Lemmon	Mount Lemmon Survey	·	2.5 km	MPC · JPL
441378	2008 EG_{78}	—	March 7, 2008	Kitt Peak	Spacewatch	KOR	1.3 km	MPC · JPL
441379	2008 EJ_{92}	—	March 3, 2008	Catalina	CSS	·	3.0 km	MPC · JPL
441380	2008 EE_{94}	—	March 4, 2008	Mount Lemmon	Mount Lemmon Survey	·	2.9 km	MPC · JPL
441381	2008 EL_{97}	—	February 12, 2008	Mount Lemmon	Mount Lemmon Survey	·	2.6 km	MPC · JPL
441382	2008 EE_{119}	—	February 12, 2008	Mount Lemmon	Mount Lemmon Survey	·	2.8 km	MPC · JPL
441383	2008 EB_{158}	—	March 2, 2008	Kitt Peak	Spacewatch	·	2.6 km	MPC · JPL
441384	2008 ES_{168}	—	March 12, 2008	Kitt Peak	Spacewatch	·	650 m	MPC · JPL
441385	2008 FU	—	March 25, 2008	Kitt Peak	Spacewatch	·	4.2 km	MPC · JPL
441386	2008 FD_{13}	—	March 1, 2008	Kitt Peak	Spacewatch	·	2.3 km	MPC · JPL
441387	2008 FT_{17}	—	March 27, 2008	Kitt Peak	Spacewatch	·	1.9 km	MPC · JPL
441388	2008 FD_{22}	—	March 27, 2008	Kitt Peak	Spacewatch	·	2.6 km	MPC · JPL
441389	2008 FJ_{24}	—	March 5, 2008	Mount Lemmon	Mount Lemmon Survey	·	2.5 km	MPC · JPL
441390	2008 FK_{24}	—	March 27, 2008	Kitt Peak	Spacewatch	·	2.9 km	MPC · JPL
441391	2008 FD_{30}	—	February 8, 2008	Kitt Peak	Spacewatch	·	2.0 km	MPC · JPL
441392	2008 FQ_{38}	—	March 28, 2008	Kitt Peak	Spacewatch	·	600 m	MPC · JPL
441393	2008 FU_{44}	—	February 3, 2008	Kitt Peak	Spacewatch	·	2.4 km	MPC · JPL
441394	2008 FR_{53}	—	March 13, 2008	Kitt Peak	Spacewatch	HYG	2.6 km	MPC · JPL
441395	2008 FT_{55}	—	March 5, 2008	Kitt Peak	Spacewatch	·	2.6 km	MPC · JPL
441396	2008 FT_{59}	—	March 29, 2008	Mount Lemmon	Mount Lemmon Survey	·	2.2 km	MPC · JPL
441397	2008 FS_{85}	—	March 28, 2008	Mount Lemmon	Mount Lemmon Survey	·	2.6 km	MPC · JPL
441398	2008 FX_{93}	—	March 29, 2008	Kitt Peak	Spacewatch	·	2.6 km	MPC · JPL
441399	2008 FA_{102}	—	March 30, 2008	Kitt Peak	Spacewatch	·	470 m	MPC · JPL
441400	2008 FQ_{102}	—	March 30, 2008	Kitt Peak	Spacewatch	·	600 m	MPC · JPL

== 441401–441500 ==
back to top

Designation			Discovery			Properties		Ref
Permanent	Provisional	Named after	Date	Site	Discoverer(s)	Category	Diam.	Ref
441401	2008 FT_{110}	—	March 31, 2008	Kitt Peak	Spacewatch	·	620 m	MPC · JPL
441402	2008 FO_{112}	—	August 22, 2004	Kitt Peak	Spacewatch	·	2.9 km	MPC · JPL
441403	2008 FG_{128}	—	March 28, 2008	Mount Lemmon	Mount Lemmon Survey	·	540 m	MPC · JPL
441404	2008 FJ_{129}	—	March 30, 2008	Kitt Peak	Spacewatch	·	4.6 km	MPC · JPL
441405	2008 FJ_{130}	—	March 29, 2008	Kitt Peak	Spacewatch	·	3.5 km	MPC · JPL
441406	2008 FS_{136}	—	March 29, 2008	Kitt Peak	Spacewatch	·	780 m	MPC · JPL
441407	2008 FV_{137}	—	March 31, 2008	Catalina	CSS	·	3.8 km	MPC · JPL
441408	2008 GA	—	April 1, 2008	Piszkéstető	K. Sárneczky	·	3.4 km	MPC · JPL
441409	2008 GY_{1}	—	February 13, 2008	Catalina	CSS	·	3.5 km	MPC · JPL
441410	2008 GT_{11}	—	April 1, 2008	Kitt Peak	Spacewatch	·	810 m	MPC · JPL
441411	2008 GP_{17}	—	April 4, 2008	Kitt Peak	Spacewatch	·	640 m	MPC · JPL
441412	2008 GH_{24}	—	April 1, 2008	Mount Lemmon	Mount Lemmon Survey	·	4.5 km	MPC · JPL
441413	2008 GH_{26}	—	March 4, 2008	Mount Lemmon	Mount Lemmon Survey	·	2.0 km	MPC · JPL
441414	2008 GU_{36}	—	April 3, 2008	Kitt Peak	Spacewatch	CYB	4.6 km	MPC · JPL
441415	2008 GQ_{38}	—	April 3, 2008	Mount Lemmon	Mount Lemmon Survey	·	630 m	MPC · JPL
441416	2008 GK_{46}	—	April 4, 2008	Kitt Peak	Spacewatch	·	620 m	MPC · JPL
441417	2008 GL_{47}	—	April 4, 2008	Kitt Peak	Spacewatch	EOS	2.3 km	MPC · JPL
441418	2008 GG_{50}	—	April 5, 2008	Mount Lemmon	Mount Lemmon Survey	·	2.9 km	MPC · JPL
441419	2008 GS_{50}	—	April 5, 2008	Mount Lemmon	Mount Lemmon Survey	·	2.5 km	MPC · JPL
441420	2008 GZ_{54}	—	April 5, 2008	Mount Lemmon	Mount Lemmon Survey	·	630 m	MPC · JPL
441421	2008 GL_{60}	—	April 5, 2008	Kitt Peak	Spacewatch	·	600 m	MPC · JPL
441422	2008 GN_{62}	—	April 5, 2008	Catalina	CSS	·	4.5 km	MPC · JPL
441423	2008 GV_{62}	—	March 12, 2008	Mount Lemmon	Mount Lemmon Survey	·	6.1 km	MPC · JPL
441424	2008 GE_{84}	—	April 3, 2008	Kitt Peak	Spacewatch	·	2.5 km	MPC · JPL
441425	2008 GD_{89}	—	March 29, 2008	Kitt Peak	Spacewatch	·	520 m	MPC · JPL
441426	2008 GV_{96}	—	April 8, 2008	Mount Lemmon	Mount Lemmon Survey	·	3.4 km	MPC · JPL
441427	2008 GT_{99}	—	March 28, 2008	Kitt Peak	Spacewatch	·	3.2 km	MPC · JPL
441428	2008 GJ_{100}	—	March 5, 2008	Mount Lemmon	Mount Lemmon Survey	·	650 m	MPC · JPL
441429	2008 GC_{127}	—	April 14, 2008	Mount Lemmon	Mount Lemmon Survey	·	3.9 km	MPC · JPL
441430	2008 GT_{132}	—	April 14, 2008	Mount Lemmon	Mount Lemmon Survey	·	2.9 km	MPC · JPL
441431	2008 GC_{138}	—	April 13, 2008	Mount Lemmon	Mount Lemmon Survey	·	3.5 km	MPC · JPL
441432	2008 GG_{139}	—	April 3, 2008	Kitt Peak	Spacewatch	·	2.7 km	MPC · JPL
441433	2008 HN	—	March 12, 2008	Kitt Peak	Spacewatch	·	500 m	MPC · JPL
441434	2008 HE_{4}	—	March 30, 2008	Catalina	CSS	·	2.8 km	MPC · JPL
441435	2008 HE_{8}	—	April 3, 2008	Mount Lemmon	Mount Lemmon Survey	·	2.5 km	MPC · JPL
441436	2008 HG_{9}	—	April 24, 2008	Kitt Peak	Spacewatch	LIX	3.6 km	MPC · JPL
441437	2008 HM_{15}	—	April 6, 2008	Kitt Peak	Spacewatch	·	3.9 km	MPC · JPL
441438	2008 HP_{17}	—	March 31, 2008	Mount Lemmon	Mount Lemmon Survey	·	640 m	MPC · JPL
441439	2008 HL_{21}	—	March 29, 2008	Kitt Peak	Spacewatch	EOS	1.6 km	MPC · JPL
441440	2008 HU_{21}	—	April 26, 2008	Mount Lemmon	Mount Lemmon Survey	·	3.3 km	MPC · JPL
441441	2008 HG_{24}	—	April 27, 2008	Kitt Peak	Spacewatch	EOS	2.0 km	MPC · JPL
441442	2008 HW_{43}	—	April 1, 2008	Kitt Peak	Spacewatch	·	600 m	MPC · JPL
441443	2008 HH_{46}	—	April 28, 2008	Kitt Peak	Spacewatch	·	660 m	MPC · JPL
441444	2008 HX_{48}	—	March 11, 2008	Mount Lemmon	Mount Lemmon Survey	·	2.8 km	MPC · JPL
441445	2008 HY_{54}	—	April 29, 2008	Kitt Peak	Spacewatch	·	620 m	MPC · JPL
441446	2008 HS_{57}	—	April 30, 2008	Kitt Peak	Spacewatch	·	2.7 km	MPC · JPL
441447	2008 HM_{67}	—	April 29, 2008	Kitt Peak	Spacewatch	·	570 m	MPC · JPL
441448	2008 HF_{68}	—	April 29, 2008	Mount Lemmon	Mount Lemmon Survey	·	880 m	MPC · JPL
441449	2008 JJ_{9}	—	April 28, 2008	Mount Lemmon	Mount Lemmon Survey	·	4.0 km	MPC · JPL
441450	2008 KY_{4}	—	May 5, 2008	Kitt Peak	Spacewatch	·	520 m	MPC · JPL
441451	2008 KK_{9}	—	May 27, 2008	Kitt Peak	Spacewatch	·	560 m	MPC · JPL
441452	2008 KV_{33}	—	May 29, 2008	Kitt Peak	Spacewatch	·	3.2 km	MPC · JPL
441453	2008 MO_{3}	—	June 30, 2008	Kitt Peak	Spacewatch	·	610 m	MPC · JPL
441454	2008 OS_{2}	—	July 27, 2008	La Sagra	OAM	·	750 m	MPC · JPL
441455	2008 OO_{3}	—	July 25, 2008	Catalina	CSS	·	1.4 km	MPC · JPL
441456	2008 OT_{3}	—	July 25, 2008	Siding Spring	SSS	·	680 m	MPC · JPL
441457	2008 OE_{22}	—	July 30, 2008	Kitt Peak	Spacewatch	V	490 m	MPC · JPL
441458	2008 PN_{2}	—	October 29, 2005	Kitt Peak	Spacewatch	BAP	920 m	MPC · JPL
441459	2008 PF_{11}	—	August 7, 2008	Reedy Creek	J. Broughton	·	690 m	MPC · JPL
441460	2008 PN_{14}	—	July 29, 2008	Kitt Peak	Spacewatch	·	1.1 km	MPC · JPL
441461	2008 PA_{19}	—	August 7, 2008	Kitt Peak	Spacewatch	·	720 m	MPC · JPL
441462	2008 PD_{22}	—	October 23, 2001	Socorro	LINEAR	·	680 m	MPC · JPL
441463	2008 QQ_{5}	—	August 22, 2008	Kitt Peak	Spacewatch	·	950 m	MPC · JPL
441464	2008 QE_{21}	—	August 26, 2008	Socorro	LINEAR	·	1.0 km	MPC · JPL
441465	2008 QU_{23}	—	August 7, 2008	Kitt Peak	Spacewatch	MAS	630 m	MPC · JPL
441466	2008 QD_{34}	—	August 29, 2008	La Sagra	OAM	NYS	1.2 km	MPC · JPL
441467	2008 QE_{36}	—	August 21, 2008	Kitt Peak	Spacewatch	·	650 m	MPC · JPL
441468	2008 RS_{1}	—	September 2, 2008	Kitt Peak	Spacewatch	·	860 m	MPC · JPL
441469	2008 RL_{58}	—	September 3, 2008	Kitt Peak	Spacewatch	·	770 m	MPC · JPL
441470	2008 RC_{70}	—	September 5, 2008	Kitt Peak	Spacewatch	·	670 m	MPC · JPL
441471	2008 RS_{73}	—	September 6, 2008	Catalina	CSS	PHO	1.0 km	MPC · JPL
441472	2008 RV_{86}	—	September 5, 2008	Kitt Peak	Spacewatch	·	1.2 km	MPC · JPL
441473	2008 RJ_{94}	—	September 6, 2008	Mount Lemmon	Mount Lemmon Survey	NYS	960 m	MPC · JPL
441474	2008 RD_{106}	—	September 6, 2008	Catalina	CSS	·	1.1 km	MPC · JPL
441475	2008 RY_{114}	—	September 6, 2008	Mount Lemmon	Mount Lemmon Survey	·	860 m	MPC · JPL
441476	2008 RK_{118}	—	September 9, 2008	Mount Lemmon	Mount Lemmon Survey	·	1.6 km	MPC · JPL
441477	2008 RQ_{119}	—	September 10, 2008	Kitt Peak	Spacewatch	MAS	590 m	MPC · JPL
441478	2008 RP_{128}	—	September 9, 2008	Mount Lemmon	Mount Lemmon Survey	·	1.6 km	MPC · JPL
441479	2008 RD_{129}	—	September 9, 2008	Kitt Peak	Spacewatch	·	1.7 km	MPC · JPL
441480	2008 RQ_{131}	—	September 5, 2008	Kitt Peak	Spacewatch	·	910 m	MPC · JPL
441481	2008 RB_{142}	—	September 4, 2008	Kitt Peak	Spacewatch	·	850 m	MPC · JPL
441482	2008 SJ_{6}	—	September 4, 2008	Kitt Peak	Spacewatch	NYS	1.1 km	MPC · JPL
441483	2008 SB_{15}	—	September 19, 2008	Kitt Peak	Spacewatch	·	910 m	MPC · JPL
441484	2008 SG_{26}	—	September 19, 2008	Kitt Peak	Spacewatch	·	840 m	MPC · JPL
441485	2008 SL_{32}	—	September 5, 2008	Kitt Peak	Spacewatch	·	1.0 km	MPC · JPL
441486	2008 SS_{46}	—	September 20, 2008	Kitt Peak	Spacewatch	·	1.0 km	MPC · JPL
441487	2008 SX_{49}	—	September 20, 2008	Mount Lemmon	Mount Lemmon Survey	·	800 m	MPC · JPL
441488	2008 SA_{58}	—	September 20, 2008	Kitt Peak	Spacewatch	·	1.1 km	MPC · JPL
441489	2008 ST_{58}	—	September 20, 2008	Kitt Peak	Spacewatch	·	950 m	MPC · JPL
441490	2008 SB_{63}	—	September 21, 2008	Kitt Peak	Spacewatch	·	1.2 km	MPC · JPL
441491	2008 SL_{71}	—	September 22, 2008	Kitt Peak	Spacewatch	·	1.3 km	MPC · JPL
441492	2008 SQ_{71}	—	September 22, 2008	Kitt Peak	Spacewatch	NYS	1.2 km	MPC · JPL
441493	2008 SN_{72}	—	September 22, 2008	Kitt Peak	Spacewatch	·	890 m	MPC · JPL
441494	2008 SE_{77}	—	September 23, 2008	Mount Lemmon	Mount Lemmon Survey	·	850 m	MPC · JPL
441495	2008 SF_{81}	—	September 23, 2008	Mount Lemmon	Mount Lemmon Survey	·	860 m	MPC · JPL
441496	2008 SF_{89}	—	September 21, 2008	Kitt Peak	Spacewatch	·	750 m	MPC · JPL
441497	2008 SA_{90}	—	September 21, 2008	Kitt Peak	Spacewatch	·	1.3 km	MPC · JPL
441498	2008 SN_{97}	—	September 21, 2008	Kitt Peak	Spacewatch	·	1.0 km	MPC · JPL
441499	2008 SQ_{97}	—	September 21, 2008	Kitt Peak	Spacewatch	·	1.1 km	MPC · JPL
441500	2008 SR_{98}	—	September 21, 2008	Kitt Peak	Spacewatch	NYS	930 m	MPC · JPL

== 441501–441600 ==
back to top

Designation			Discovery			Properties		Ref
Permanent	Provisional	Named after	Date	Site	Discoverer(s)	Category	Diam.	Ref
441501	2008 SY_{99}	—	September 21, 2008	Kitt Peak	Spacewatch	NYS	1.1 km	MPC · JPL
441502	2008 SV_{111}	—	September 7, 2008	Mount Lemmon	Mount Lemmon Survey	MAS	570 m	MPC · JPL
441503	2008 SH_{117}	—	September 22, 2008	Mount Lemmon	Mount Lemmon Survey	·	1.0 km	MPC · JPL
441504	2008 SS_{125}	—	September 22, 2008	Mount Lemmon	Mount Lemmon Survey	MAS	610 m	MPC · JPL
441505	2008 SG_{126}	—	September 22, 2008	Mount Lemmon	Mount Lemmon Survey	NYS	1.2 km	MPC · JPL
441506	2008 SW_{126}	—	September 22, 2008	Kitt Peak	Spacewatch	·	1.1 km	MPC · JPL
441507	2008 SG_{129}	—	September 22, 2008	Kitt Peak	Spacewatch	·	1.1 km	MPC · JPL
441508	2008 SL_{131}	—	September 22, 2008	Kitt Peak	Spacewatch	·	870 m	MPC · JPL
441509	2008 SO_{136}	—	September 23, 2008	Kitt Peak	Spacewatch	3:2	4.8 km	MPC · JPL
441510	2008 SY_{139}	—	September 24, 2008	Catalina	CSS	·	930 m	MPC · JPL
441511	2008 SZ_{139}	—	August 24, 2008	Kitt Peak	Spacewatch	·	1.3 km	MPC · JPL
441512	2008 SZ_{141}	—	September 24, 2008	Mount Lemmon	Mount Lemmon Survey	MAS	690 m	MPC · JPL
441513	2008 SH_{146}	—	September 23, 2008	Kitt Peak	Spacewatch	·	870 m	MPC · JPL
441514	2008 SP_{149}	—	September 28, 2008	Dauban	Kugel, F.	·	860 m	MPC · JPL
441515	2008 SJ_{152}	—	September 23, 2008	Catalina	CSS	·	850 m	MPC · JPL
441516	2008 SR_{159}	—	September 24, 2008	Socorro	LINEAR	·	870 m	MPC · JPL
441517	2008 SB_{160}	—	September 24, 2008	Socorro	LINEAR	·	840 m	MPC · JPL
441518	2008 SM_{164}	—	September 28, 2008	Socorro	LINEAR	MAS	800 m	MPC · JPL
441519	2008 SC_{168}	—	September 21, 2008	Kitt Peak	Spacewatch	·	1.3 km	MPC · JPL
441520	2008 SE_{175}	—	September 23, 2008	Kitt Peak	Spacewatch	·	960 m	MPC · JPL
441521	2008 SF_{181}	—	September 24, 2008	Kitt Peak	Spacewatch	·	780 m	MPC · JPL
441522	2008 SX_{181}	—	September 24, 2008	Mount Lemmon	Mount Lemmon Survey	·	990 m	MPC · JPL
441523	2008 SC_{183}	—	September 24, 2008	Mount Lemmon	Mount Lemmon Survey	·	1.1 km	MPC · JPL
441524	2008 SP_{185}	—	September 24, 2008	Siding Spring	SSS	PHO	1.4 km	MPC · JPL
441525	2008 SK_{220}	—	September 30, 2008	La Sagra	OAM	3:2	7.0 km	MPC · JPL
441526	2008 SQ_{221}	—	September 25, 2008	Mount Lemmon	Mount Lemmon Survey	·	850 m	MPC · JPL
441527	2008 SV_{242}	—	September 29, 2008	Kitt Peak	Spacewatch	MAS	580 m	MPC · JPL
441528	2008 SC_{243}	—	September 29, 2008	Kitt Peak	Spacewatch	NYS	980 m	MPC · JPL
441529	2008 SQ_{256}	—	September 21, 2008	Kitt Peak	Spacewatch	NYS	910 m	MPC · JPL
441530	2008 SD_{258}	—	September 22, 2008	Kitt Peak	Spacewatch	·	1.2 km	MPC · JPL
441531	2008 SH_{282}	—	September 29, 2008	Mount Lemmon	Mount Lemmon Survey	·	990 m	MPC · JPL
441532	2008 SU_{283}	—	September 23, 2008	Kitt Peak	Spacewatch	·	1.3 km	MPC · JPL
441533	2008 SV_{283}	—	September 23, 2008	Kitt Peak	Spacewatch	·	1.7 km	MPC · JPL
441534	2008 SP_{286}	—	September 22, 2008	Kitt Peak	Spacewatch	·	800 m	MPC · JPL
441535	2008 SA_{300}	—	September 22, 2008	Kitt Peak	Spacewatch	·	1.1 km	MPC · JPL
441536	2008 SG_{307}	—	September 29, 2008	Kitt Peak	Spacewatch	·	1.1 km	MPC · JPL
441537	2008 SX_{307}	—	September 29, 2008	Kitt Peak	Spacewatch	MAS	710 m	MPC · JPL
441538	2008 SA_{308}	—	September 29, 2008	Kitt Peak	Spacewatch	·	1.1 km	MPC · JPL
441539	2008 SP_{309}	—	September 22, 2008	Mount Lemmon	Mount Lemmon Survey	MAS	740 m	MPC · JPL
441540	2008 TF_{5}	—	October 1, 2008	La Sagra	OAM	NYS	1.0 km	MPC · JPL
441541	2008 TJ_{9}	—	October 1, 2008	Kitt Peak	Spacewatch	NYS	860 m	MPC · JPL
441542	2008 TP_{17}	—	October 1, 2008	Mount Lemmon	Mount Lemmon Survey	NYS	750 m	MPC · JPL
441543	2008 TC_{20}	—	September 22, 2008	Mount Lemmon	Mount Lemmon Survey	·	1.1 km	MPC · JPL
441544	2008 TK_{22}	—	October 1, 2008	Kitt Peak	Spacewatch	V	650 m	MPC · JPL
441545	2008 TV_{35}	—	October 1, 2008	Mount Lemmon	Mount Lemmon Survey	CLA	1.3 km	MPC · JPL
441546	2008 TH_{43}	—	October 1, 2008	Mount Lemmon	Mount Lemmon Survey	·	1.7 km	MPC · JPL
441547	2008 TY_{47}	—	October 1, 2008	Kitt Peak	Spacewatch	·	1.3 km	MPC · JPL
441548	2008 TD_{67}	—	October 2, 2008	Kitt Peak	Spacewatch	T_{j} (2.99) · 3:2	5.7 km	MPC · JPL
441549	2008 TM_{68}	—	October 2, 2008	Kitt Peak	Spacewatch	·	1.1 km	MPC · JPL
441550	2008 TT_{69}	—	September 23, 2008	Kitt Peak	Spacewatch	3:2	4.9 km	MPC · JPL
441551	2008 TC_{77}	—	October 2, 2008	Mount Lemmon	Mount Lemmon Survey	·	1.1 km	MPC · JPL
441552	2008 TR_{83}	—	October 3, 2008	Kitt Peak	Spacewatch	CLA	1.4 km	MPC · JPL
441553	2008 TC_{91}	—	October 3, 2008	Kitt Peak	Spacewatch	V	600 m	MPC · JPL
441554	2008 TS_{120}	—	October 7, 2008	Mount Lemmon	Mount Lemmon Survey	·	860 m	MPC · JPL
441555	2008 TP_{125}	—	October 8, 2008	Mount Lemmon	Mount Lemmon Survey	·	1.2 km	MPC · JPL
441556	2008 TD_{136}	—	October 8, 2008	Kitt Peak	Spacewatch	·	1.0 km	MPC · JPL
441557	2008 TO_{138}	—	September 23, 2008	Kitt Peak	Spacewatch	·	1.8 km	MPC · JPL
441558	2008 TW_{157}	—	September 23, 2008	Catalina	CSS	PHO	920 m	MPC · JPL
441559	2008 TF_{167}	—	October 8, 2008	Mount Lemmon	Mount Lemmon Survey	·	1.2 km	MPC · JPL
441560	2008 TP_{176}	—	October 10, 2008	Kitt Peak	Spacewatch	·	870 m	MPC · JPL
441561	2008 TM_{177}	—	October 9, 2008	Catalina	CSS	PHO	810 m	MPC · JPL
441562	2008 TD_{188}	—	October 9, 2008	Kitt Peak	Spacewatch	·	1.1 km	MPC · JPL
441563 Domanski	2008 UK	Domanski	October 19, 2008	Charleston	Sobczuk, B.	3:2	5.9 km	MPC · JPL
441564	2008 UN_{7}	—	October 26, 2008	Bisei SG Center	BATTeRS	T_{j} (2.95)	3.9 km	MPC · JPL
441565	2008 UJ_{23}	—	September 7, 2008	Mount Lemmon	Mount Lemmon Survey	NYS	830 m	MPC · JPL
441566	2008 UR_{24}	—	October 20, 2008	Kitt Peak	Spacewatch	·	930 m	MPC · JPL
441567	2008 UJ_{30}	—	October 20, 2008	Kitt Peak	Spacewatch	·	1.4 km	MPC · JPL
441568	2008 UT_{31}	—	October 20, 2008	Kitt Peak	Spacewatch	NYS	1.2 km	MPC · JPL
441569	2008 UJ_{33}	—	October 20, 2008	Kitt Peak	Spacewatch	·	1.4 km	MPC · JPL
441570	2008 UJ_{36}	—	September 6, 2008	Mount Lemmon	Mount Lemmon Survey	V	670 m	MPC · JPL
441571	2008 UX_{41}	—	October 20, 2008	Kitt Peak	Spacewatch	SUL	1.8 km	MPC · JPL
441572	2008 UJ_{42}	—	October 20, 2008	Kitt Peak	Spacewatch	NYS	890 m	MPC · JPL
441573	2008 UP_{43}	—	October 20, 2008	Mount Lemmon	Mount Lemmon Survey	NYS	880 m	MPC · JPL
441574	2008 UG_{46}	—	October 20, 2008	Kitt Peak	Spacewatch	·	920 m	MPC · JPL
441575	2008 UD_{48}	—	October 20, 2008	Mount Lemmon	Mount Lemmon Survey	·	1.1 km	MPC · JPL
441576	2008 UH_{54}	—	October 20, 2008	Kitt Peak	Spacewatch	·	1.1 km	MPC · JPL
441577	2008 UU_{57}	—	October 21, 2008	Kitt Peak	Spacewatch	·	1.0 km	MPC · JPL
441578	2008 UN_{65}	—	October 21, 2008	Kitt Peak	Spacewatch	EUN	1.3 km	MPC · JPL
441579	2008 UB_{74}	—	October 21, 2008	Kitt Peak	Spacewatch	·	1.1 km	MPC · JPL
441580	2008 UH_{80}	—	October 22, 2008	Kitt Peak	Spacewatch	·	880 m	MPC · JPL
441581	2008 UU_{83}	—	September 25, 2008	Mount Lemmon	Mount Lemmon Survey	·	1.6 km	MPC · JPL
441582	2008 UW_{94}	—	October 24, 2008	Mount Lemmon	Mount Lemmon Survey	·	1.0 km	MPC · JPL
441583	2008 UM_{96}	—	October 25, 2008	Mount Lemmon	Mount Lemmon Survey	V	700 m	MPC · JPL
441584	2008 US_{97}	—	October 1, 2008	Kitt Peak	Spacewatch	·	1.6 km	MPC · JPL
441585	2008 UO_{98}	—	October 26, 2008	Socorro	LINEAR	(5)	1.7 km	MPC · JPL
441586	2008 UW_{98}	—	October 27, 2008	Socorro	LINEAR	·	1.7 km	MPC · JPL
441587	2008 UL_{113}	—	October 22, 2008	Kitt Peak	Spacewatch	·	1.2 km	MPC · JPL
441588	2008 UA_{114}	—	October 22, 2008	Kitt Peak	Spacewatch	·	1.0 km	MPC · JPL
441589	2008 UT_{114}	—	October 22, 2008	Kitt Peak	Spacewatch	·	1.1 km	MPC · JPL
441590	2008 UK_{119}	—	October 22, 2008	Kitt Peak	Spacewatch	·	1.1 km	MPC · JPL
441591	2008 UT_{122}	—	October 22, 2008	Kitt Peak	Spacewatch	·	1.0 km	MPC · JPL
441592	2008 UC_{128}	—	October 22, 2008	Kitt Peak	Spacewatch	·	1.5 km	MPC · JPL
441593	2008 UA_{157}	—	October 23, 2008	Mount Lemmon	Mount Lemmon Survey	·	1.1 km	MPC · JPL
441594	2008 UA_{167}	—	October 24, 2008	Kitt Peak	Spacewatch	·	1.1 km	MPC · JPL
441595	2008 UH_{176}	—	October 24, 2008	Mount Lemmon	Mount Lemmon Survey	NYS	1.1 km	MPC · JPL
441596	2008 UL_{178}	—	October 24, 2008	Mount Lemmon	Mount Lemmon Survey	·	1.3 km	MPC · JPL
441597	2008 UC_{180}	—	October 24, 2008	Kitt Peak	Spacewatch	3:2	4.6 km	MPC · JPL
441598	2008 UJ_{186}	—	October 20, 2008	Mount Lemmon	Mount Lemmon Survey	·	2.1 km	MPC · JPL
441599	2008 UW_{195}	—	September 24, 2008	Mount Lemmon	Mount Lemmon Survey	·	920 m	MPC · JPL
441600	2008 UC_{201}	—	October 28, 2008	Socorro	LINEAR	·	820 m	MPC · JPL

== 441601–441700 ==
back to top

Designation			Discovery			Properties		Ref
Permanent	Provisional	Named after	Date	Site	Discoverer(s)	Category	Diam.	Ref
441601	2008 UC_{208}	—	September 22, 2008	Mount Lemmon	Mount Lemmon Survey	V	660 m	MPC · JPL
441602	2008 UK_{213}	—	October 24, 2008	Catalina	CSS	·	1.2 km	MPC · JPL
441603	2008 UD_{219}	—	October 25, 2008	Kitt Peak	Spacewatch	NYS	1.1 km	MPC · JPL
441604	2008 UR_{232}	—	October 26, 2008	Kitt Peak	Spacewatch	·	1 km	MPC · JPL
441605	2008 UT_{234}	—	May 24, 2007	Mount Lemmon	Mount Lemmon Survey	·	1.3 km	MPC · JPL
441606	2008 UV_{237}	—	October 26, 2008	Kitt Peak	Spacewatch	V	710 m	MPC · JPL
441607	2008 UR_{239}	—	October 26, 2008	Kitt Peak	Spacewatch	3:2	5.0 km	MPC · JPL
441608	2008 UQ_{271}	—	October 28, 2008	Kitt Peak	Spacewatch	NYS	850 m	MPC · JPL
441609	2008 UF_{272}	—	October 20, 2008	Kitt Peak	Spacewatch	V	700 m	MPC · JPL
441610	2008 UZ_{290}	—	October 28, 2008	Kitt Peak	Spacewatch	·	910 m	MPC · JPL
441611	2008 UX_{292}	—	October 9, 2008	Kitt Peak	Spacewatch	·	1.4 km	MPC · JPL
441612	2008 UL_{300}	—	September 9, 2008	Kitt Peak	Spacewatch	V	640 m	MPC · JPL
441613	2008 UO_{300}	—	September 29, 2008	Catalina	CSS	·	1.1 km	MPC · JPL
441614	2008 UF_{309}	—	October 30, 2008	Catalina	CSS	·	1.4 km	MPC · JPL
441615	2008 US_{315}	—	October 30, 2008	Kitt Peak	Spacewatch	·	950 m	MPC · JPL
441616	2008 UU_{315}	—	October 30, 2008	Kitt Peak	Spacewatch	MAS	630 m	MPC · JPL
441617	2008 UB_{316}	—	September 25, 2008	Mount Lemmon	Mount Lemmon Survey	·	960 m	MPC · JPL
441618	2008 UN_{320}	—	October 31, 2008	Catalina	CSS	·	1.2 km	MPC · JPL
441619	2008 US_{342}	—	October 29, 2008	Kitt Peak	Spacewatch	·	1.1 km	MPC · JPL
441620	2008 UQ_{345}	—	October 31, 2008	Mount Lemmon	Mount Lemmon Survey	·	1.6 km	MPC · JPL
441621	2008 US_{365}	—	October 22, 2008	Mount Lemmon	Mount Lemmon Survey	·	1.1 km	MPC · JPL
441622	2008 UP_{366}	—	October 20, 2008	Mount Lemmon	Mount Lemmon Survey	·	1.0 km	MPC · JPL
441623	2008 US_{369}	—	October 29, 2008	Kitt Peak	Spacewatch	·	1.2 km	MPC · JPL
441624	2008 VH_{1}	—	November 1, 2008	Socorro	LINEAR	·	4.7 km	MPC · JPL
441625	2008 VP_{1}	—	October 31, 2008	Catalina	CSS	·	1.3 km	MPC · JPL
441626	2008 VG_{5}	—	November 2, 2008	Mount Lemmon	Mount Lemmon Survey	·	1.1 km	MPC · JPL
441627	2008 VD_{18}	—	November 1, 2008	Kitt Peak	Spacewatch	·	1.2 km	MPC · JPL
441628	2008 VN_{18}	—	November 1, 2008	Kitt Peak	Spacewatch	ERI	1.4 km	MPC · JPL
441629	2008 VJ_{33}	—	November 2, 2008	Mount Lemmon	Mount Lemmon Survey	·	1 km	MPC · JPL
441630	2008 VA_{40}	—	November 3, 2008	Mount Lemmon	Mount Lemmon Survey	NYS	930 m	MPC · JPL
441631	2008 VE_{51}	—	November 4, 2008	Kitt Peak	Spacewatch	NYS	910 m	MPC · JPL
441632	2008 VS_{58}	—	November 7, 2008	Mount Lemmon	Mount Lemmon Survey	·	1.2 km	MPC · JPL
441633	2008 VB_{68}	—	November 5, 2008	Siding Spring	SSS	·	1.2 km	MPC · JPL
441634	2008 VT_{71}	—	November 8, 2008	Mount Lemmon	Mount Lemmon Survey	·	1.5 km	MPC · JPL
441635	2008 VW_{72}	—	November 1, 2008	Mount Lemmon	Mount Lemmon Survey	·	1.2 km	MPC · JPL
441636	2008 VY_{74}	—	November 1, 2008	Mount Lemmon	Mount Lemmon Survey	·	1.3 km	MPC · JPL
441637	2008 VZ_{76}	—	November 2, 2008	Mount Lemmon	Mount Lemmon Survey	·	1.2 km	MPC · JPL
441638	2008 VA_{78}	—	November 7, 2008	Mount Lemmon	Mount Lemmon Survey	·	950 m	MPC · JPL
441639	2008 VC_{78}	—	November 7, 2008	Mount Lemmon	Mount Lemmon Survey	NYS	990 m	MPC · JPL
441640	2008 WG_{13}	—	November 7, 2008	Mount Lemmon	Mount Lemmon Survey	PHO	1.1 km	MPC · JPL
441641	2008 WZ_{13}	—	November 20, 2008	Mount Lemmon	Mount Lemmon Survey	APO · PHA	660 m	MPC · JPL
441642	2008 WF_{24}	—	November 18, 2008	Kitt Peak	Spacewatch	MAS	730 m	MPC · JPL
441643	2008 WQ_{24}	—	September 22, 2008	Mount Lemmon	Mount Lemmon Survey	NYS	1.0 km	MPC · JPL
441644	2008 WL_{27}	—	October 24, 2008	Kitt Peak	Spacewatch	·	1.3 km	MPC · JPL
441645	2008 WZ_{28}	—	November 19, 2008	Mount Lemmon	Mount Lemmon Survey	NYS	1.2 km	MPC · JPL
441646	2008 WO_{31}	—	March 2, 2006	Kitt Peak	Spacewatch	(5)	1.3 km	MPC · JPL
441647	2008 WQ_{43}	—	November 17, 2008	Kitt Peak	Spacewatch	·	1.0 km	MPC · JPL
441648	2008 WM_{44}	—	November 17, 2008	Kitt Peak	Spacewatch	·	1.4 km	MPC · JPL
441649	2008 WY_{45}	—	November 3, 2004	Kitt Peak	Spacewatch	·	1.1 km	MPC · JPL
441650	2008 WC_{66}	—	November 18, 2008	Catalina	CSS	NYS	1.0 km	MPC · JPL
441651	2008 WZ_{68}	—	November 18, 2008	Kitt Peak	Spacewatch	·	850 m	MPC · JPL
441652	2008 WB_{72}	—	September 28, 2008	Mount Lemmon	Mount Lemmon Survey	·	910 m	MPC · JPL
441653	2008 WZ_{73}	—	November 29, 1978	Palomar	C. T. Kowal	·	1.3 km	MPC · JPL
441654	2008 WQ_{74}	—	November 20, 2008	Kitt Peak	Spacewatch	·	1.0 km	MPC · JPL
441655	2008 WD_{80}	—	October 1, 2008	Mount Lemmon	Mount Lemmon Survey	·	980 m	MPC · JPL
441656	2008 WZ_{87}	—	April 22, 2007	Kitt Peak	Spacewatch	·	1.1 km	MPC · JPL
441657	2008 WH_{90}	—	November 22, 2008	Kitt Peak	Spacewatch	·	1.0 km	MPC · JPL
441658	2008 WQ_{91}	—	November 8, 2008	Mount Lemmon	Mount Lemmon Survey	·	2.0 km	MPC · JPL
441659	2008 WV_{95}	—	November 24, 2008	La Sagra	OAM	H	640 m	MPC · JPL
441660	2008 WS_{108}	—	November 30, 2008	Catalina	CSS	·	1.4 km	MPC · JPL
441661	2008 WE_{112}	—	November 30, 2008	Kitt Peak	Spacewatch	NYS	1.2 km	MPC · JPL
441662	2008 WJ_{124}	—	November 21, 2008	Kitt Peak	Spacewatch	·	3.6 km	MPC · JPL
441663	2008 WL_{134}	—	November 21, 2008	Mount Lemmon	Mount Lemmon Survey	·	1.8 km	MPC · JPL
441664	2008 WW_{134}	—	November 30, 2008	Mount Lemmon	Mount Lemmon Survey	EUN	1.7 km	MPC · JPL
441665	2008 WE_{135}	—	November 18, 2008	Kitt Peak	Spacewatch	MAS	690 m	MPC · JPL
441666	2008 WU_{137}	—	November 24, 2008	Kitt Peak	Spacewatch	·	1.1 km	MPC · JPL
441667	2008 WR_{138}	—	November 19, 2008	Mount Lemmon	Mount Lemmon Survey	T_{j} (2.99) · 3:2 · SHU	4.6 km	MPC · JPL
441668	2008 XE_{11}	—	December 1, 2008	Catalina	CSS	·	2.2 km	MPC · JPL
441669	2008 XP_{14}	—	December 1, 2008	Kitt Peak	Spacewatch	·	770 m	MPC · JPL
441670	2008 XO_{36}	—	December 2, 2008	Kitt Peak	Spacewatch	NYS	850 m	MPC · JPL
441671	2008 XX_{37}	—	November 20, 2008	Kitt Peak	Spacewatch	·	1.4 km	MPC · JPL
441672	2008 XU_{38}	—	December 2, 2008	Kitt Peak	Spacewatch	·	940 m	MPC · JPL
441673	2008 XU_{43}	—	November 23, 2008	Mount Lemmon	Mount Lemmon Survey	RAF	840 m	MPC · JPL
441674	2008 XK_{48}	—	December 4, 2008	Mount Lemmon	Mount Lemmon Survey	·	1.1 km	MPC · JPL
441675	2008 XP_{52}	—	December 2, 2008	Mount Lemmon	Mount Lemmon Survey	·	1.6 km	MPC · JPL
441676	2008 YB_{6}	—	December 21, 2008	San Marcello	San Marcello	·	1.2 km	MPC · JPL
441677	2008 YO_{6}	—	December 3, 2008	Mount Lemmon	Mount Lemmon Survey	·	1.1 km	MPC · JPL
441678	2008 YR_{15}	—	December 4, 2008	Mount Lemmon	Mount Lemmon Survey	V	560 m	MPC · JPL
441679	2008 YB_{18}	—	December 21, 2008	Mount Lemmon	Mount Lemmon Survey	·	1.1 km	MPC · JPL
441680	2008 YE_{22}	—	November 8, 2008	Mount Lemmon	Mount Lemmon Survey	·	1.2 km	MPC · JPL
441681	2008 YK_{30}	—	November 7, 2008	Mount Lemmon	Mount Lemmon Survey	·	890 m	MPC · JPL
441682	2008 YM_{45}	—	December 29, 2008	Mount Lemmon	Mount Lemmon Survey	·	1.2 km	MPC · JPL
441683	2008 YW_{47}	—	December 21, 2008	Kitt Peak	Spacewatch	·	1.2 km	MPC · JPL
441684	2008 YE_{53}	—	December 29, 2008	Mount Lemmon	Mount Lemmon Survey	·	850 m	MPC · JPL
441685	2008 YW_{89}	—	December 21, 2008	Mount Lemmon	Mount Lemmon Survey	·	1.2 km	MPC · JPL
441686	2008 YG_{93}	—	December 21, 2008	Kitt Peak	Spacewatch	·	1.7 km	MPC · JPL
441687	2008 YK_{96}	—	December 29, 2008	Mount Lemmon	Mount Lemmon Survey	·	2.0 km	MPC · JPL
441688	2008 YL_{99}	—	December 29, 2008	Kitt Peak	Spacewatch	·	1.1 km	MPC · JPL
441689	2008 YC_{100}	—	May 24, 2006	Kitt Peak	Spacewatch	MAR	920 m	MPC · JPL
441690	2008 YP_{107}	—	December 21, 2008	Mount Lemmon	Mount Lemmon Survey	·	1.1 km	MPC · JPL
441691	2008 YK_{108}	—	December 29, 2008	Kitt Peak	Spacewatch	·	2.4 km	MPC · JPL
441692	2008 YS_{113}	—	December 21, 2008	Kitt Peak	Spacewatch	·	990 m	MPC · JPL
441693	2008 YD_{124}	—	December 30, 2008	Kitt Peak	Spacewatch	·	940 m	MPC · JPL
441694	2008 YN_{124}	—	December 22, 2008	Kitt Peak	Spacewatch	·	1.3 km	MPC · JPL
441695	2008 YG_{135}	—	November 30, 2008	Mount Lemmon	Mount Lemmon Survey	·	1.2 km	MPC · JPL
441696	2008 YT_{139}	—	December 30, 2008	Kitt Peak	Spacewatch	·	1.2 km	MPC · JPL
441697	2008 YF_{148}	—	November 24, 2008	Mount Lemmon	Mount Lemmon Survey	H	550 m	MPC · JPL
441698	2008 YF_{158}	—	December 30, 2008	Mount Lemmon	Mount Lemmon Survey	·	2.2 km	MPC · JPL
441699	2008 YR_{159}	—	December 21, 2008	Mount Lemmon	Mount Lemmon Survey	·	890 m	MPC · JPL
441700	2008 YU_{165}	—	December 31, 2008	Mount Lemmon	Mount Lemmon Survey	·	740 m	MPC · JPL

== 441701–441800 ==
back to top

Designation			Discovery			Properties		Ref
Permanent	Provisional	Named after	Date	Site	Discoverer(s)	Category	Diam.	Ref
441701	2008 YH_{171}	—	December 28, 2008	Socorro	LINEAR	H	530 m	MPC · JPL
441702	2009 AY	—	January 1, 2009	Bisei SG Center	BATTeRS	(5)	1.0 km	MPC · JPL
441703	2009 AV_{6}	—	November 21, 2008	Mount Lemmon	Mount Lemmon Survey	·	1.8 km	MPC · JPL
441704	2009 AP_{9}	—	December 2, 2008	Mount Lemmon	Mount Lemmon Survey	·	1.4 km	MPC · JPL
441705	2009 AT_{12}	—	January 2, 2009	Mount Lemmon	Mount Lemmon Survey	·	940 m	MPC · JPL
441706	2009 AB_{31}	—	January 15, 2009	Kitt Peak	Spacewatch	·	1.3 km	MPC · JPL
441707	2009 AK_{31}	—	November 24, 2008	Mount Lemmon	Mount Lemmon Survey	·	1.3 km	MPC · JPL
441708	2009 AB_{32}	—	January 2, 2009	Kitt Peak	Spacewatch	·	1.7 km	MPC · JPL
441709	2009 AM_{42}	—	January 1, 2009	Kitt Peak	Spacewatch	(5)	810 m	MPC · JPL
441710	2009 AT_{46}	—	January 7, 2009	Kitt Peak	Spacewatch	·	1.8 km	MPC · JPL
441711	2009 BW	—	December 21, 2008	Catalina	CSS	·	1.4 km	MPC · JPL
441712	2009 BW_{3}	—	December 5, 2008	Mount Lemmon	Mount Lemmon Survey	·	1.9 km	MPC · JPL
441713	2009 BB_{5}	—	January 16, 2009	Needville	J. Dellinger	·	2.1 km	MPC · JPL
441714	2009 BQ_{6}	—	November 21, 2008	Mount Lemmon	Mount Lemmon Survey	·	1.3 km	MPC · JPL
441715	2009 BO_{9}	—	October 2, 2008	Mount Lemmon	Mount Lemmon Survey	·	2.1 km	MPC · JPL
441716	2009 BR_{16}	—	January 16, 2009	Kitt Peak	Spacewatch	EUN	1.0 km	MPC · JPL
441717	2009 BN_{19}	—	December 29, 2008	Kitt Peak	Spacewatch	H	520 m	MPC · JPL
441718	2009 BO_{33}	—	January 16, 2009	Kitt Peak	Spacewatch	·	1.6 km	MPC · JPL
441719	2009 BC_{34}	—	January 16, 2009	Kitt Peak	Spacewatch	·	1.4 km	MPC · JPL
441720	2009 BC_{37}	—	January 16, 2009	Kitt Peak	Spacewatch	·	1.2 km	MPC · JPL
441721	2009 BK_{37}	—	January 16, 2009	Kitt Peak	Spacewatch	·	920 m	MPC · JPL
441722	2009 BB_{51}	—	January 16, 2009	Mount Lemmon	Mount Lemmon Survey	·	1.3 km	MPC · JPL
441723	2009 BU_{51}	—	January 2, 2009	Mount Lemmon	Mount Lemmon Survey	·	1.6 km	MPC · JPL
441724	2009 BA_{52}	—	January 16, 2009	Mount Lemmon	Mount Lemmon Survey	·	1.1 km	MPC · JPL
441725	2009 BJ_{52}	—	January 2, 2009	Mount Lemmon	Mount Lemmon Survey	·	1.6 km	MPC · JPL
441726	2009 BT_{52}	—	January 16, 2009	Mount Lemmon	Mount Lemmon Survey	·	1.4 km	MPC · JPL
441727	2009 BL_{53}	—	January 16, 2009	Mount Lemmon	Mount Lemmon Survey	·	1.7 km	MPC · JPL
441728	2009 BT_{60}	—	December 4, 2008	Mount Lemmon	Mount Lemmon Survey	EUN	1.3 km	MPC · JPL
441729	2009 BL_{66}	—	January 20, 2009	Kitt Peak	Spacewatch	·	1.6 km	MPC · JPL
441730	2009 BT_{68}	—	January 1, 2009	Kitt Peak	Spacewatch	·	1.6 km	MPC · JPL
441731	2009 BD_{69}	—	January 25, 2009	Catalina	CSS	EUN	950 m	MPC · JPL
441732	2009 BZ_{74}	—	December 1, 2008	Mount Lemmon	Mount Lemmon Survey	·	1.4 km	MPC · JPL
441733	2009 BV_{77}	—	January 25, 2009	Socorro	LINEAR	H	640 m	MPC · JPL
441734	2009 BR_{81}	—	December 29, 2008	Mount Lemmon	Mount Lemmon Survey	EUN	1.3 km	MPC · JPL
441735	2009 BC_{89}	—	January 25, 2009	Kitt Peak	Spacewatch	·	1.5 km	MPC · JPL
441736	2009 BO_{90}	—	January 15, 2009	Kitt Peak	Spacewatch	·	1.6 km	MPC · JPL
441737	2009 BB_{99}	—	January 26, 2009	Purple Mountain	PMO NEO Survey Program	·	1.9 km	MPC · JPL
441738	2009 BL_{102}	—	January 29, 2009	Mount Lemmon	Mount Lemmon Survey	H	570 m	MPC · JPL
441739	2009 BP_{103}	—	January 25, 2009	Kitt Peak	Spacewatch	·	1.5 km	MPC · JPL
441740	2009 BN_{107}	—	January 18, 2009	Kitt Peak	Spacewatch	·	980 m	MPC · JPL
441741	2009 BN_{110}	—	January 31, 2009	Mount Lemmon	Mount Lemmon Survey	·	1.5 km	MPC · JPL
441742	2009 BR_{111}	—	January 29, 2009	Kitt Peak	Spacewatch	·	850 m	MPC · JPL
441743	2009 BH_{134}	—	January 2, 2009	Mount Lemmon	Mount Lemmon Survey	·	1.5 km	MPC · JPL
441744	2009 BA_{136}	—	January 29, 2009	Kitt Peak	Spacewatch	·	2.1 km	MPC · JPL
441745	2009 BM_{139}	—	January 29, 2009	Kitt Peak	Spacewatch	·	1.4 km	MPC · JPL
441746	2009 BJ_{141}	—	January 30, 2009	Kitt Peak	Spacewatch	·	2.1 km	MPC · JPL
441747	2009 BJ_{150}	—	January 31, 2009	Kitt Peak	Spacewatch	·	1.3 km	MPC · JPL
441748	2009 BF_{157}	—	January 25, 2009	Kitt Peak	Spacewatch	·	2.0 km	MPC · JPL
441749	2009 BB_{159}	—	January 25, 2009	Kitt Peak	Spacewatch	·	1.6 km	MPC · JPL
441750	2009 BG_{169}	—	January 18, 2009	Kitt Peak	Spacewatch	·	2.1 km	MPC · JPL
441751	2009 BL_{175}	—	January 29, 2009	Kitt Peak	Spacewatch	·	2.0 km	MPC · JPL
441752	2009 CG_{2}	—	February 2, 2009	Moletai	K. Černis, Zdanavicius, J.	·	1.7 km	MPC · JPL
441753	2009 CY_{3}	—	January 1, 2009	Mount Lemmon	Mount Lemmon Survey	·	1.0 km	MPC · JPL
441754	2009 CG_{4}	—	November 19, 2008	Mount Lemmon	Mount Lemmon Survey	·	1.1 km	MPC · JPL
441755	2009 CU_{5}	—	February 14, 2009	La Sagra	OAM	H	1.2 km	MPC · JPL
441756	2009 CU_{14}	—	February 1, 2009	Kitt Peak	Spacewatch	·	1.5 km	MPC · JPL
441757	2009 CK_{21}	—	January 15, 2009	Kitt Peak	Spacewatch	MAR	870 m	MPC · JPL
441758	2009 CN_{22}	—	January 18, 2009	Mount Lemmon	Mount Lemmon Survey	·	2.1 km	MPC · JPL
441759	2009 CO_{28}	—	January 17, 2009	Kitt Peak	Spacewatch	·	1.2 km	MPC · JPL
441760	2009 CS_{30}	—	February 1, 2009	Kitt Peak	Spacewatch	·	2.9 km	MPC · JPL
441761	2009 CU_{34}	—	February 2, 2009	Mount Lemmon	Mount Lemmon Survey	·	1.7 km	MPC · JPL
441762	2009 CD_{39}	—	February 13, 2009	Kitt Peak	Spacewatch	H	660 m	MPC · JPL
441763	2009 CS_{41}	—	January 29, 2009	Kitt Peak	Spacewatch	·	1.6 km	MPC · JPL
441764	2009 CZ_{47}	—	January 29, 2009	Mount Lemmon	Mount Lemmon Survey	·	1.4 km	MPC · JPL
441765	2009 CJ_{50}	—	February 14, 2009	La Sagra	OAM	BRG	1.5 km	MPC · JPL
441766	2009 CR_{51}	—	December 22, 2008	Mount Lemmon	Mount Lemmon Survey	·	1.8 km	MPC · JPL
441767	2009 CK_{52}	—	January 15, 2009	Kitt Peak	Spacewatch	(5)	980 m	MPC · JPL
441768	2009 CX_{64}	—	February 5, 2009	Kitt Peak	Spacewatch	·	1.5 km	MPC · JPL
441769	2009 DT_{2}	—	February 2, 2009	Mount Lemmon	Mount Lemmon Survey	·	2.1 km	MPC · JPL
441770	2009 DQ_{3}	—	February 19, 2009	Sandlot	G. Hug	WIT	990 m	MPC · JPL
441771	2009 DU_{3}	—	February 20, 2009	Mount Lemmon	Mount Lemmon Survey	·	540 m	MPC · JPL
441772	2009 DE_{4}	—	January 15, 2009	Kitt Peak	Spacewatch	·	1.6 km	MPC · JPL
441773	2009 DU_{7}	—	December 30, 2008	Mount Lemmon	Mount Lemmon Survey	·	1.6 km	MPC · JPL
441774	2009 DM_{31}	—	January 1, 2009	Kitt Peak	Spacewatch	·	2.7 km	MPC · JPL
441775	2009 DS_{34}	—	February 20, 2009	Kitt Peak	Spacewatch	EUN	1.1 km	MPC · JPL
441776	2009 DM_{41}	—	January 16, 2009	Kitt Peak	Spacewatch	EUN	1.3 km	MPC · JPL
441777	2009 DF_{45}	—	February 22, 2009	Socorro	LINEAR	·	3.5 km	MPC · JPL
441778	2009 DZ_{45}	—	January 26, 2009	XuYi	PMO NEO Survey Program	·	2.1 km	MPC · JPL
441779	2009 DF_{49}	—	February 19, 2009	Kitt Peak	Spacewatch	·	2.2 km	MPC · JPL
441780	2009 DG_{49}	—	February 19, 2009	Kitt Peak	Spacewatch	·	1.5 km	MPC · JPL
441781	2009 DA_{55}	—	February 1, 2009	Kitt Peak	Spacewatch	·	1.5 km	MPC · JPL
441782	2009 DY_{63}	—	February 22, 2009	Kitt Peak	Spacewatch	EUN	1.1 km	MPC · JPL
441783	2009 DT_{64}	—	February 3, 2009	Kitt Peak	Spacewatch	·	2.3 km	MPC · JPL
441784	2009 DA_{72}	—	October 29, 2008	Mount Lemmon	Mount Lemmon Survey	·	1.3 km	MPC · JPL
441785	2009 DB_{79}	—	February 21, 2009	Kitt Peak	Spacewatch	·	1.7 km	MPC · JPL
441786	2009 DF_{89}	—	February 24, 2009	Kitt Peak	Spacewatch	·	2.0 km	MPC · JPL
441787	2009 DK_{107}	—	February 28, 2009	Kitt Peak	Spacewatch	·	1.1 km	MPC · JPL
441788	2009 DE_{126}	—	February 19, 2009	Kitt Peak	Spacewatch	·	1.9 km	MPC · JPL
441789	2009 DA_{135}	—	February 20, 2009	Kitt Peak	Spacewatch	·	2.3 km	MPC · JPL
441790	2009 EQ_{12}	—	November 6, 2008	Mount Lemmon	Mount Lemmon Survey	·	1.5 km	MPC · JPL
441791	2009 EC_{16}	—	February 14, 2009	Kitt Peak	Spacewatch	·	1.4 km	MPC · JPL
441792	2009 ED_{18}	—	March 15, 2009	Kitt Peak	Spacewatch	·	3.1 km	MPC · JPL
441793	2009 EL_{18}	—	March 15, 2009	Kitt Peak	Spacewatch	·	1.6 km	MPC · JPL
441794	2009 ES_{24}	—	March 2, 2009	Mount Lemmon	Mount Lemmon Survey	KOR	1.2 km	MPC · JPL
441795	2009 FM_{9}	—	February 20, 2009	Catalina	CSS	H	550 m	MPC · JPL
441796	2009 FN_{27}	—	October 1, 2008	Mount Lemmon	Mount Lemmon Survey	·	1.3 km	MPC · JPL
441797	2009 FQ_{27}	—	February 27, 2000	Kitt Peak	Spacewatch	·	2.2 km	MPC · JPL
441798	2009 FV_{27}	—	March 21, 2009	Catalina	CSS	·	3.3 km	MPC · JPL
441799	2009 FJ_{41}	—	March 21, 2009	Catalina	CSS	·	1.5 km	MPC · JPL
441800	2009 FY_{45}	—	February 1, 2009	Mount Lemmon	Mount Lemmon Survey	·	2.5 km	MPC · JPL

== 441801–441900 ==
back to top

Designation			Discovery			Properties		Ref
Permanent	Provisional	Named after	Date	Site	Discoverer(s)	Category	Diam.	Ref
441801	2009 FV_{53}	—	December 17, 2007	Mount Lemmon	Mount Lemmon Survey	·	2.0 km	MPC · JPL
441802	2009 FH_{64}	—	March 31, 2009	Kitt Peak	Spacewatch	·	1.5 km	MPC · JPL
441803	2009 FC_{65}	—	February 29, 2004	Kitt Peak	Spacewatch	·	1.9 km	MPC · JPL
441804	2009 FW_{73}	—	March 28, 2009	Mount Lemmon	Mount Lemmon Survey	·	3.0 km	MPC · JPL
441805	2009 HQ_{8}	—	October 21, 2007	Mount Lemmon	Mount Lemmon Survey	ADE	2.1 km	MPC · JPL
441806	2009 HJ_{24}	—	April 2, 2009	Mount Lemmon	Mount Lemmon Survey	·	2.3 km	MPC · JPL
441807	2009 HE_{34}	—	March 26, 2009	Mount Lemmon	Mount Lemmon Survey	·	3.0 km	MPC · JPL
441808	2009 HV_{39}	—	March 2, 2009	Kitt Peak	Spacewatch	·	2.1 km	MPC · JPL
441809	2009 HV_{48}	—	April 19, 2009	Kitt Peak	Spacewatch	·	2.4 km	MPC · JPL
441810	2009 HD_{99}	—	April 22, 2009	Mount Lemmon	Mount Lemmon Survey	·	2.5 km	MPC · JPL
441811	2009 HF_{102}	—	April 20, 2009	Mount Lemmon	Mount Lemmon Survey	·	2.2 km	MPC · JPL
441812	2009 JH_{8}	—	April 20, 2009	Kitt Peak	Spacewatch	·	2.3 km	MPC · JPL
441813	2009 KH_{5}	—	May 24, 2009	Kitt Peak	Spacewatch	·	3.3 km	MPC · JPL
441814	2009 KP_{23}	—	March 31, 2009	Mount Lemmon	Mount Lemmon Survey	EOS	2.0 km	MPC · JPL
441815	2009 KU_{23}	—	April 30, 2009	Kitt Peak	Spacewatch	T_{j} (2.96)	4.4 km	MPC · JPL
441816	2009 KC_{24}	—	May 27, 2009	Kitt Peak	Spacewatch	·	2.8 km	MPC · JPL
441817	2009 LM_{4}	—	June 12, 2009	Kitt Peak	Spacewatch	·	3.8 km	MPC · JPL
441818	2009 MW_{8}	—	June 28, 2009	La Sagra	OAM	·	5.0 km	MPC · JPL
441819	2009 NW_{1}	—	July 11, 2009	Siding Spring	SSS	T_{j} (2.95)	4.6 km	MPC · JPL
441820	2009 OD_{10}	—	July 29, 2009	La Sagra	OAM	·	4.4 km	MPC · JPL
441821	2009 OW_{12}	—	July 27, 2009	Kitt Peak	Spacewatch	·	4.5 km	MPC · JPL
441822	2009 OC_{17}	—	July 28, 2009	Kitt Peak	Spacewatch	EOS	2.2 km	MPC · JPL
441823	2009 QO_{5}	—	August 18, 2009	Kitt Peak	Spacewatch	AMO	130 m	MPC · JPL
441824	2009 RO_{61}	—	April 1, 2008	Kitt Peak	Spacewatch	·	3.4 km	MPC · JPL
441825	2009 SK_{1}	—	September 17, 2009	Catalina	CSS	AMO	740 m	MPC · JPL
441826	2009 SR_{64}	—	April 19, 2007	Kitt Peak	Spacewatch	VER	2.6 km	MPC · JPL
441827	2009 SA_{88}	—	September 18, 2009	Kitt Peak	Spacewatch	·	1.2 km	MPC · JPL
441828	2009 SF_{97}	—	September 20, 2009	Mount Lemmon	Mount Lemmon Survey	·	2.4 km	MPC · JPL
441829	2009 SQ_{241}	—	September 18, 2009	Catalina	CSS	·	4.6 km	MPC · JPL
441830	2009 SJ_{244}	—	December 10, 2006	Kitt Peak	Spacewatch	·	710 m	MPC · JPL
441831	2009 SB_{286}	—	September 25, 2009	Mount Lemmon	Mount Lemmon Survey	·	720 m	MPC · JPL
441832	2009 SK_{343}	—	September 17, 2009	Kitt Peak	Spacewatch	·	620 m	MPC · JPL
441833	2009 TU_{19}	—	September 20, 2009	Mount Lemmon	Mount Lemmon Survey	3:2	4.5 km	MPC · JPL
441834	2009 TW_{47}	—	October 1, 2009	Mount Lemmon	Mount Lemmon Survey	·	820 m	MPC · JPL
441835	2009 UH_{53}	—	September 15, 2009	Kitt Peak	Spacewatch	SYL · CYB	5.5 km	MPC · JPL
441836	2009 UC_{82}	—	October 11, 2009	Mount Lemmon	Mount Lemmon Survey	·	700 m	MPC · JPL
441837	2009 UZ_{125}	—	October 14, 2009	Catalina	CSS	·	620 m	MPC · JPL
441838	2009 VJ_{5}	—	December 24, 2006	Kitt Peak	Spacewatch	·	1.2 km	MPC · JPL
441839	2009 VU_{28}	—	September 20, 2009	Mount Lemmon	Mount Lemmon Survey	3:2	4.7 km	MPC · JPL
441840	2009 VK_{31}	—	October 26, 2009	Kitt Peak	Spacewatch	·	600 m	MPC · JPL
441841	2009 VB_{35}	—	March 29, 2008	Mount Lemmon	Mount Lemmon Survey	·	570 m	MPC · JPL
441842	2009 VJ_{35}	—	November 10, 2009	Mount Lemmon	Mount Lemmon Survey	·	1.2 km	MPC · JPL
441843	2009 VK_{53}	—	October 24, 2009	Kitt Peak	Spacewatch	·	710 m	MPC · JPL
441844	2009 VK_{58}	—	November 15, 2009	Catalina	CSS	·	820 m	MPC · JPL
441845	2009 VU_{73}	—	September 20, 2009	Mount Lemmon	Mount Lemmon Survey	3:2	4.3 km	MPC · JPL
441846	2009 VX_{98}	—	March 15, 2007	Kitt Peak	Spacewatch	(6769)	1.7 km	MPC · JPL
441847	2009 VG_{114}	—	November 9, 2009	Kitt Peak	Spacewatch	·	800 m	MPC · JPL
441848	2009 WN_{10}	—	November 17, 2009	Catalina	CSS	T_{j} (2.99) · 3:2	6.0 km	MPC · JPL
441849	2009 WO_{20}	—	December 27, 2006	Mount Lemmon	Mount Lemmon Survey	·	640 m	MPC · JPL
441850	2009 WJ_{23}	—	November 18, 2009	Kitt Peak	Spacewatch	·	1.5 km	MPC · JPL
441851	2009 WK_{33}	—	November 16, 2009	Kitt Peak	Spacewatch	3:2	5.3 km	MPC · JPL
441852	2009 WC_{42}	—	November 17, 2009	Kitt Peak	Spacewatch	·	590 m	MPC · JPL
441853	2009 WD_{71}	—	November 10, 2009	Kitt Peak	Spacewatch	·	560 m	MPC · JPL
441854	2009 WR_{96}	—	November 20, 2009	Mount Lemmon	Mount Lemmon Survey	·	1.3 km	MPC · JPL
441855	2009 WY_{96}	—	September 21, 2009	Mount Lemmon	Mount Lemmon Survey	·	780 m	MPC · JPL
441856	2009 WD_{101}	—	October 25, 2009	Kitt Peak	Spacewatch	V	660 m	MPC · JPL
441857	2009 WP_{162}	—	November 21, 2009	Kitt Peak	Spacewatch	·	1.4 km	MPC · JPL
441858	2009 WS_{169}	—	October 24, 2009	Kitt Peak	Spacewatch	·	610 m	MPC · JPL
441859	2009 WU_{171}	—	December 13, 2006	Kitt Peak	Spacewatch	·	620 m	MPC · JPL
441860	2009 WH_{190}	—	November 24, 2009	Kitt Peak	Spacewatch	·	820 m	MPC · JPL
441861	2009 WF_{219}	—	November 16, 2009	Kitt Peak	Spacewatch	·	580 m	MPC · JPL
441862	2009 WX_{260}	—	November 25, 2009	Kitt Peak	Spacewatch	·	490 m	MPC · JPL
441863	2009 WE_{262}	—	November 18, 2009	Kitt Peak	Spacewatch	·	970 m	MPC · JPL
441864	2009 XG	—	November 26, 2009	Mount Lemmon	Mount Lemmon Survey	·	780 m	MPC · JPL
441865	2009 YZ_{2}	—	December 17, 2009	Mount Lemmon	Mount Lemmon Survey	·	1.2 km	MPC · JPL
441866	2009 YM_{11}	—	December 18, 2009	Mount Lemmon	Mount Lemmon Survey	·	1.6 km	MPC · JPL
441867	2009 YA_{15}	—	December 18, 2009	Mount Lemmon	Mount Lemmon Survey	·	1.4 km	MPC · JPL
441868	2009 YC_{17}	—	December 16, 2009	Kitt Peak	Spacewatch	V	750 m	MPC · JPL
441869	2009 YG_{23}	—	November 17, 2009	Mount Lemmon	Mount Lemmon Survey	·	900 m	MPC · JPL
441870	2009 YF_{25}	—	December 26, 2009	Kitt Peak	Spacewatch	MAS	650 m	MPC · JPL
441871	2010 AX_{38}	—	November 21, 2009	Mount Lemmon	Mount Lemmon Survey	·	1.1 km	MPC · JPL
441872	2010 AC_{40}	—	January 9, 2010	Tzec Maun	D. Chestnov, A. Novichonok	PHO	1.7 km	MPC · JPL
441873	2010 AB_{55}	—	January 8, 2010	Kitt Peak	Spacewatch	NYS	970 m	MPC · JPL
441874	2010 AC_{60}	—	January 6, 2010	Catalina	CSS	·	650 m	MPC · JPL
441875	2010 AX_{128}	—	August 29, 2006	Catalina	CSS	·	1.6 km	MPC · JPL
441876	2010 AV_{133}	—	January 15, 2010	WISE	WISE	·	3.0 km	MPC · JPL
441877	2010 BS_{6}	—	April 21, 2006	Catalina	CSS	·	3.2 km	MPC · JPL
441878	2010 BK_{13}	—	January 16, 2010	WISE	WISE	·	2.6 km	MPC · JPL
441879	2010 BC_{74}	—	August 26, 2011	Haleakala	Pan-STARRS 1	·	2.5 km	MPC · JPL
441880	2010 CX_{9}	—	February 8, 2010	WISE	WISE	·	4.5 km	MPC · JPL
441881	2010 CW_{31}	—	February 9, 2010	Catalina	CSS	PHO	2.2 km	MPC · JPL
441882	2010 CC_{51}	—	December 1, 2008	Kitt Peak	Spacewatch	·	2.6 km	MPC · JPL
441883	2010 CM_{70}	—	February 13, 2010	Mount Lemmon	Mount Lemmon Survey	CLA	1.6 km	MPC · JPL
441884	2010 CX_{73}	—	July 29, 2008	Kitt Peak	Spacewatch	·	850 m	MPC · JPL
441885	2010 CH_{79}	—	November 20, 2008	Mount Lemmon	Mount Lemmon Survey	·	1.4 km	MPC · JPL
441886	2010 CZ_{98}	—	February 14, 2010	Kitt Peak	Spacewatch	EUN	1.1 km	MPC · JPL
441887	2010 CS_{103}	—	February 14, 2010	Kitt Peak	Spacewatch	·	2.0 km	MPC · JPL
441888	2010 CY_{155}	—	February 15, 2010	Kitt Peak	Spacewatch	·	2.3 km	MPC · JPL
441889	2010 CH_{161}	—	May 26, 1998	Kitt Peak	Spacewatch	ADE	1.5 km	MPC · JPL
441890	2010 CC_{162}	—	February 9, 2010	Kitt Peak	Spacewatch	·	1.3 km	MPC · JPL
441891	2010 CE_{181}	—	May 23, 2003	Kitt Peak	Spacewatch	·	1.3 km	MPC · JPL
441892	2010 CU_{181}	—	October 6, 2008	Mount Lemmon	Mount Lemmon Survey	·	1.5 km	MPC · JPL
441893	2010 CC_{182}	—	February 14, 2010	Haleakala	Pan-STARRS 1	·	1.2 km	MPC · JPL
441894	2010 DT_{25}	—	February 20, 2010	WISE	WISE	·	3.4 km	MPC · JPL
441895	2010 EM	—	March 1, 2010	WISE	WISE	·	3.0 km	MPC · JPL
441896	2010 EF_{29}	—	February 15, 2010	Kitt Peak	Spacewatch	·	1.4 km	MPC · JPL
441897	2010 EG_{32}	—	March 4, 2010	Kitt Peak	Spacewatch	EUN	1.0 km	MPC · JPL
441898	2010 EP_{33}	—	March 4, 2010	Kitt Peak	Spacewatch	·	1.8 km	MPC · JPL
441899	2010 EU_{66}	—	March 4, 2010	Kitt Peak	Spacewatch	·	820 m	MPC · JPL
441900	2010 EC_{68}	—	March 12, 2010	Mount Lemmon	Mount Lemmon Survey	·	2.1 km	MPC · JPL

== 441901–442000 ==
back to top

Designation			Discovery			Properties		Ref
Permanent	Provisional	Named after	Date	Site	Discoverer(s)	Category	Diam.	Ref
441901	2010 ES_{73}	—	February 19, 2010	Mount Lemmon	Mount Lemmon Survey	·	1.3 km	MPC · JPL
441902	2010 EX_{77}	—	February 19, 2010	Mount Lemmon	Mount Lemmon Survey	·	1.1 km	MPC · JPL
441903	2010 EH_{97}	—	March 14, 2010	Mount Lemmon	Mount Lemmon Survey	·	1.2 km	MPC · JPL
441904	2010 EZ_{102}	—	September 14, 2007	Mount Lemmon	Mount Lemmon Survey	·	1.2 km	MPC · JPL
441905	2010 EH_{104}	—	December 17, 2009	Kitt Peak	Spacewatch	·	2.6 km	MPC · JPL
441906	2010 EC_{111}	—	March 13, 2010	Kitt Peak	Spacewatch	JUN	930 m	MPC · JPL
441907	2010 EW_{122}	—	March 15, 2010	Kitt Peak	Spacewatch	JUN	1.1 km	MPC · JPL
441908	2010 EM_{134}	—	March 12, 2010	Kitt Peak	Spacewatch	·	1.8 km	MPC · JPL
441909	2010 EN_{171}	—	April 24, 2006	Kitt Peak	Spacewatch	(1547)	1.3 km	MPC · JPL
441910	2010 FW_{14}	—	March 17, 2010	Catalina	CSS	·	1.7 km	MPC · JPL
441911	2010 FU_{19}	—	March 18, 2010	Mount Lemmon	Mount Lemmon Survey	·	2.0 km	MPC · JPL
441912	2010 FD_{85}	—	March 19, 2010	Catalina	CSS	·	1.9 km	MPC · JPL
441913	2010 FO_{87}	—	August 10, 2007	Kitt Peak	Spacewatch	(5)	880 m	MPC · JPL
441914	2010 FL_{101}	—	March 16, 2010	Catalina	CSS	BRA	1.9 km	MPC · JPL
441915	2010 GT_{94}	—	January 24, 2007	Mount Lemmon	Mount Lemmon Survey	·	4.6 km	MPC · JPL
441916	2010 GO_{119}	—	April 11, 2010	Kitt Peak	Spacewatch	·	1.5 km	MPC · JPL
441917	2010 GT_{123}	—	February 16, 2010	Mount Lemmon	Mount Lemmon Survey	·	2.1 km	MPC · JPL
441918	2010 GN_{127}	—	May 25, 2006	Kitt Peak	Spacewatch	·	1.3 km	MPC · JPL
441919	2010 GE_{142}	—	April 9, 2010	Mount Lemmon	Mount Lemmon Survey	EUN	990 m	MPC · JPL
441920	2010 GW_{145}	—	April 9, 2010	Catalina	CSS	·	2.3 km	MPC · JPL
441921	2010 HB_{5}	—	April 16, 2010	WISE	WISE	·	3.8 km	MPC · JPL
441922	2010 HK_{45}	—	April 23, 2010	WISE	WISE	·	4.0 km	MPC · JPL
441923	2010 HA_{70}	—	April 27, 2010	WISE	WISE	·	5.2 km	MPC · JPL
441924	2010 JB_{2}	—	May 3, 2010	Kitt Peak	Spacewatch	·	2.5 km	MPC · JPL
441925	2010 JK_{3}	—	May 5, 2010	Nogales	M. Schwartz, P. R. Holvorcem	·	1.6 km	MPC · JPL
441926	2010 JL_{13}	—	May 2, 2010	WISE	WISE	·	3.0 km	MPC · JPL
441927	2010 JQ_{30}	—	January 19, 2005	Kitt Peak	Spacewatch	·	1.3 km	MPC · JPL
441928	2010 JT_{31}	—	May 5, 2010	La Sagra	OAM	·	2.3 km	MPC · JPL
441929	2010 JB_{34}	—	May 4, 2010	Catalina	CSS	·	1.7 km	MPC · JPL
441930	2010 JM_{37}	—	April 8, 2010	Kitt Peak	Spacewatch	·	1.3 km	MPC · JPL
441931	2010 JS_{43}	—	May 4, 2010	Kitt Peak	Spacewatch	·	1.9 km	MPC · JPL
441932	2010 JZ_{43}	—	May 4, 2010	Kitt Peak	Spacewatch	·	1.1 km	MPC · JPL
441933	2010 JU_{45}	—	May 7, 2010	Kitt Peak	Spacewatch	·	1.6 km	MPC · JPL
441934	2010 JB_{77}	—	May 8, 2010	Mount Lemmon	Mount Lemmon Survey	·	2.1 km	MPC · JPL
441935	2010 JZ_{77}	—	April 20, 2010	Kitt Peak	Spacewatch	·	2.2 km	MPC · JPL
441936	2010 JP_{78}	—	April 2, 2006	Kitt Peak	Spacewatch	·	1.4 km	MPC · JPL
441937	2010 JK_{83}	—	March 8, 2005	Kitt Peak	Spacewatch	·	1.7 km	MPC · JPL
441938	2010 JA_{114}	—	May 9, 2010	Mount Lemmon	Mount Lemmon Survey	·	2.0 km	MPC · JPL
441939	2010 JG_{133}	—	May 14, 2010	WISE	WISE	T_{j} (2.98)	5.1 km	MPC · JPL
441940	2010 JL_{147}	—	April 8, 2010	Kitt Peak	Spacewatch	·	1.7 km	MPC · JPL
441941	2010 JV_{149}	—	May 7, 2010	Mount Lemmon	Mount Lemmon Survey	526	2.2 km	MPC · JPL
441942	2010 KB_{35}	—	May 19, 2010	WISE	WISE	·	2.4 km	MPC · JPL
441943	2010 KF_{62}	—	May 19, 2010	Catalina	CSS	·	1.9 km	MPC · JPL
441944	2010 KZ_{78}	—	May 25, 2010	WISE	WISE	·	2.4 km	MPC · JPL
441945	2010 KZ_{79}	—	May 25, 2010	WISE	WISE	·	3.7 km	MPC · JPL
441946	2010 KR_{95}	—	May 27, 2010	WISE	WISE	·	4.8 km	MPC · JPL
441947	2010 LE_{12}	—	June 2, 2010	WISE	WISE	·	2.6 km	MPC · JPL
441948	2010 LD_{17}	—	June 2, 2010	WISE	WISE	NAE	3.1 km	MPC · JPL
441949	2010 LZ_{33}	—	March 11, 2005	Mount Lemmon	Mount Lemmon Survey	·	2.2 km	MPC · JPL
441950	2010 LG_{35}	—	May 5, 2010	Mount Lemmon	Mount Lemmon Survey	H	560 m	MPC · JPL
441951	2010 LB_{57}	—	June 9, 2010	WISE	WISE	·	2.0 km	MPC · JPL
441952	2010 LR_{68}	—	June 8, 2010	WISE	WISE	T_{j} (2.92) · AMO +1km	2.2 km	MPC · JPL
441953	2010 LZ_{69}	—	June 9, 2010	WISE	WISE	·	3.9 km	MPC · JPL
441954	2010 LY_{72}	—	June 10, 2010	WISE	WISE	·	3.7 km	MPC · JPL
441955	2010 LL_{78}	—	June 10, 2010	WISE	WISE	·	3.9 km	MPC · JPL
441956	2010 LM_{86}	—	June 11, 2010	WISE	WISE	·	3.3 km	MPC · JPL
441957	2010 LD_{100}	—	June 13, 2010	WISE	WISE	·	2.7 km	MPC · JPL
441958	2010 LR_{101}	—	June 13, 2010	WISE	WISE	THM	2.6 km	MPC · JPL
441959	2010 LR_{116}	—	June 14, 2010	WISE	WISE	·	3.6 km	MPC · JPL
441960	2010 LV_{117}	—	June 14, 2010	WISE	WISE	·	2.4 km	MPC · JPL
441961	2010 MN_{6}	—	June 16, 2010	WISE	WISE	·	4.9 km	MPC · JPL
441962	2010 MJ_{23}	—	October 12, 2005	Kitt Peak	Spacewatch	·	2.6 km	MPC · JPL
441963	2010 MB_{24}	—	June 18, 2010	WISE	WISE	EOS	3.3 km	MPC · JPL
441964	2010 MA_{26}	—	December 5, 2005	Kitt Peak	Spacewatch	·	3.5 km	MPC · JPL
441965	2010 MS_{33}	—	October 22, 2005	Kitt Peak	Spacewatch	·	3.4 km	MPC · JPL
441966	2010 MN_{37}	—	June 21, 2010	WISE	WISE	·	4.2 km	MPC · JPL
441967	2010 MB_{49}	—	October 29, 2005	Kitt Peak	Spacewatch	·	2.4 km	MPC · JPL
441968	2010 MD_{66}	—	December 25, 2006	Kitt Peak	Spacewatch	·	3.0 km	MPC · JPL
441969	2010 MO_{70}	—	June 25, 2010	WISE	WISE	·	2.9 km	MPC · JPL
441970	2010 MK_{72}	—	June 25, 2010	WISE	WISE	·	3.4 km	MPC · JPL
441971	2010 MT_{77}	—	June 26, 2010	WISE	WISE	·	3.2 km	MPC · JPL
441972	2010 MS_{79}	—	June 26, 2010	WISE	WISE	·	2.1 km	MPC · JPL
441973	2010 MN_{81}	—	June 27, 2010	WISE	WISE	·	4.6 km	MPC · JPL
441974	2010 MQ_{92}	—	June 28, 2010	WISE	WISE	·	3.4 km	MPC · JPL
441975	2010 MX_{93}	—	November 27, 2006	Mount Lemmon	Mount Lemmon Survey	·	4.0 km	MPC · JPL
441976	2010 MW_{108}	—	June 30, 2010	WISE	WISE	·	2.9 km	MPC · JPL
441977	2010 MJ_{110}	—	June 30, 2010	WISE	WISE	·	2.4 km	MPC · JPL
441978	2010 MC_{111}	—	June 30, 2010	WISE	WISE	·	3.0 km	MPC · JPL
441979	2010 ND_{22}	—	July 6, 2010	WISE	WISE	·	2.4 km	MPC · JPL
441980	2010 NT_{23}	—	July 6, 2010	WISE	WISE	·	4.7 km	MPC · JPL
441981	2010 NV_{31}	—	October 29, 2005	Catalina	CSS	EMA	3.5 km	MPC · JPL
441982	2010 NJ_{42}	—	October 25, 2005	Catalina	CSS	·	3.8 km	MPC · JPL
441983	2010 NQ_{42}	—	October 26, 2005	Kitt Peak	Spacewatch	·	3.6 km	MPC · JPL
441984	2010 NX_{43}	—	July 9, 2010	WISE	WISE	·	3.7 km	MPC · JPL
441985	2010 NP_{53}	—	July 10, 2010	WISE	WISE	·	2.0 km	MPC · JPL
441986	2010 NG_{63}	—	July 11, 2010	WISE	WISE	·	4.9 km	MPC · JPL
441987	2010 NY_{65}	—	July 14, 2010	WISE	WISE	APO · PHA	230 m	MPC · JPL
441988	2010 NS_{71}	—	July 14, 2010	WISE	WISE	·	4.3 km	MPC · JPL
441989	2010 NA_{81}	—	July 15, 2010	WISE	WISE	·	4.6 km	MPC · JPL
441990	2010 NC_{84}	—	July 1, 2010	WISE	WISE	·	4.3 km	MPC · JPL
441991	2010 NO_{84}	—	July 1, 2010	WISE	WISE	·	4.7 km	MPC · JPL
441992	2010 NG_{86}	—	July 1, 2010	WISE	WISE	·	2.3 km	MPC · JPL
441993	2010 NT_{102}	—	October 30, 2005	Kitt Peak	Spacewatch	·	2.5 km	MPC · JPL
441994	2010 NX_{103}	—	July 12, 2010	WISE	WISE	·	3.4 km	MPC · JPL
441995	2010 NU_{106}	—	February 21, 2007	Mount Lemmon	Mount Lemmon Survey	·	3.6 km	MPC · JPL
441996	2010 OY_{5}	—	July 16, 2010	WISE	WISE	·	4.7 km	MPC · JPL
441997	2010 OZ_{5}	—	November 1, 2005	Anderson Mesa	LONEOS	·	2.7 km	MPC · JPL
441998	2010 OK_{6}	—	July 16, 2010	WISE	WISE	·	2.4 km	MPC · JPL
441999	2010 OQ_{12}	—	March 18, 2007	Kitt Peak	Spacewatch	·	3.6 km	MPC · JPL
442000	2010 OL_{14}	—	July 17, 2010	WISE	WISE	EOS	3.2 km	MPC · JPL

back to top

== Meaning of names ==
As minor planet discoveries are confirmed, they are given a permanent number by the IAU's Minor Planet Center (MPC), and the discoverers can then submit names for them, following the IAU's naming conventions. The list below concerns those minor planets in the specified number-range that have received names, and explains the meanings of those names.

Official naming citations of newly named small Solar System bodies are approved and published in a bulletin by IAU's Working Group for Small Bodies Nomenclature (WGSBN). Before May 2021, citations were published in MPC's Minor Planet Circulars for many decades. Recent citations can also be found on the JPL Small-Body Database (SBDB). Until his death in 2016, German astronomer Lutz D. Schmadel compiled these citations into the Dictionary of Minor Planet Names (DMP) and regularly updated the collection.

Based on Paul Herget's The Names of the Minor Planets, Schmadel also researched the unclear origin of numerous asteroids, most of which had been named prior to World War II. This article incorporates text from this source, which is in the public domain: SBDB New namings may only be added to this list below after official publication as the preannouncement of names is condemned. The WGSBN publishes a comprehensive guideline for the naming rules of non-cometary small Solar System bodies.

Named minor planet	Provisional	This minor planet was named for...	Ref · Catalog
441374 Wangjingxiu	2008 EL_{43}	Wang Jingxiu (b. 1944), a Chinese solar astrophysicist and academician of the Chinese Academy of Sciences	IAU · 441374
441563 Domanski	2008 UK	Juliusz Domanski (1931–2015) was an astronomy and physics popularizer in Poland. He was a long-term methodical adviser in the fields of physics and astronomy and encouraged many students.	JPL · 441563
