= List of minor planets: 424001–425000 =

The following is a partial list of minor planets, running from minor-planet number 424001 through 425000, inclusive. The primary data for this and other partial lists is based on JPL's "Small-Body Orbital Elements" and data available from the Minor Planet Center. Critical list information is also provided by the MPC, unless otherwise specified from Lowell Observatory. A detailed description of the table's columns and additional sources are given on the main page including a complete list of every page in this series, and a statistical break-up on the dynamical classification of minor planets.

Also see the summary list of all named bodies in numerical and alphabetical order, and the corresponding naming citations for the number range of this particular list. New namings may only be added to this list after official publication, as the preannouncement of names is condemned by the Working Group for Small Bodies Nomenclature of the International Astronomical Union.

Near-Earth obj.	MBA (inner)	MBA (outer)	Centaur
Mars-crosser	MBA (middle)	Jupiter trojan	Trans-Neptunian obj.
Unclassified

== 424001–424100 ==
Designation			Discovery			Properties		Ref
Permanent	Provisional	Named after	Date	Site	Discoverer(s)	Category	Diam.	Ref
424001	2006 VP_{152}	—	September 30, 2006	Mount Lemmon	Mount Lemmon Survey	MAS	570 m	MPC · JPL
424002	2006 VH_{170}	—	November 12, 2006	Mount Lemmon	Mount Lemmon Survey	·	1.0 km	MPC · JPL
424003	2006 WD_{3}	—	November 21, 2006	Mount Lemmon	Mount Lemmon Survey	·	2.1 km	MPC · JPL
424004	2006 WU_{52}	—	November 16, 2006	Kitt Peak	Spacewatch	(5)	960 m	MPC · JPL
424005	2006 WK_{56}	—	November 16, 2006	Kitt Peak	Spacewatch	·	1.1 km	MPC · JPL
424006	2006 WZ_{56}	—	November 11, 2006	Kitt Peak	Spacewatch	·	1.1 km	MPC · JPL
424007	2006 WU_{80}	—	October 20, 2006	Mount Lemmon	Mount Lemmon Survey	·	1.3 km	MPC · JPL
424008	2006 WF_{83}	—	November 18, 2006	Socorro	LINEAR	·	1.3 km	MPC · JPL
424009	2006 WP_{93}	—	November 12, 2006	Mount Lemmon	Mount Lemmon Survey	·	1.2 km	MPC · JPL
424010	2006 WS_{97}	—	November 19, 2006	Kitt Peak	Spacewatch	·	1.0 km	MPC · JPL
424011	2006 WD_{101}	—	November 19, 2006	Socorro	LINEAR	·	1.3 km	MPC · JPL
424012	2006 WG_{111}	—	November 11, 2006	Kitt Peak	Spacewatch	·	1.1 km	MPC · JPL
424013	2006 WZ_{123}	—	September 30, 2006	Mount Lemmon	Mount Lemmon Survey	·	1.1 km	MPC · JPL
424014	2006 WU_{129}	—	October 19, 2006	Catalina	CSS	V	630 m	MPC · JPL
424015	2006 WQ_{133}	—	October 28, 2006	Kitt Peak	Spacewatch	·	1.2 km	MPC · JPL
424016	2006 WR_{146}	—	November 20, 2006	Kitt Peak	Spacewatch	·	1.5 km	MPC · JPL
424017	2006 WF_{191}	—	October 22, 2006	Mount Lemmon	Mount Lemmon Survey	·	990 m	MPC · JPL
424018	2006 WZ_{194}	—	November 29, 2006	Socorro	LINEAR	·	950 m	MPC · JPL
424019	2006 XM_{9}	—	December 9, 2006	Kitt Peak	Spacewatch	·	1.0 km	MPC · JPL
424020	2006 XS_{13}	—	December 10, 2006	Kitt Peak	Spacewatch	·	1.3 km	MPC · JPL
424021	2006 XX_{15}	—	December 10, 2006	Kitt Peak	Spacewatch	·	1.5 km	MPC · JPL
424022	2006 XZ_{26}	—	November 22, 2006	Socorro	LINEAR	·	1.7 km	MPC · JPL
424023	2006 XY_{31}	—	October 21, 2006	Mount Lemmon	Mount Lemmon Survey	H	670 m	MPC · JPL
424024	2006 XK_{41}	—	November 1, 2006	Mount Lemmon	Mount Lemmon Survey	·	1.3 km	MPC · JPL
424025	2006 XW_{46}	—	December 13, 2006	Catalina	CSS	·	880 m	MPC · JPL
424026	2006 XK_{53}	—	November 27, 2006	Mount Lemmon	Mount Lemmon Survey	·	1.2 km	MPC · JPL
424027	2006 XG_{62}	—	December 15, 2006	Mount Lemmon	Mount Lemmon Survey	·	2.0 km	MPC · JPL
424028	2006 XN_{62}	—	December 11, 2006	Kitt Peak	Spacewatch	·	1.8 km	MPC · JPL
424029	2006 XA_{72}	—	December 13, 2006	Mount Lemmon	Mount Lemmon Survey	·	1.2 km	MPC · JPL
424030	2006 YE_{7}	—	December 20, 2006	Palomar	NEAT	·	1.1 km	MPC · JPL
424031	2006 YU_{13}	—	December 23, 2006	Eskridge	Farpoint	MAS	660 m	MPC · JPL
424032	2006 YV_{13}	—	December 10, 2006	Kitt Peak	Spacewatch	NYS	1.2 km	MPC · JPL
424033	2006 YS_{17}	—	November 22, 2006	Mount Lemmon	Mount Lemmon Survey	·	2.7 km	MPC · JPL
424034	2006 YO_{22}	—	November 25, 2006	Mount Lemmon	Mount Lemmon Survey	·	1.4 km	MPC · JPL
424035	2006 YA_{48}	—	December 24, 2006	Mount Lemmon	Mount Lemmon Survey	·	1.3 km	MPC · JPL
424036	2007 AA_{11}	—	November 18, 2006	Mount Lemmon	Mount Lemmon Survey	·	1.3 km	MPC · JPL
424037	2007 AH_{13}	—	January 9, 2007	Kitt Peak	Spacewatch	H	760 m	MPC · JPL
424038	2007 AH_{15}	—	January 10, 2007	Kitt Peak	Spacewatch	·	1.7 km	MPC · JPL
424039	2007 AH_{17}	—	November 27, 2006	Mount Lemmon	Mount Lemmon Survey	·	1.4 km	MPC · JPL
424040	2007 AU_{20}	—	January 10, 2007	Kitt Peak	Spacewatch	H	450 m	MPC · JPL
424041	2007 AD_{28}	—	January 8, 2007	Mount Lemmon	Mount Lemmon Survey	·	1.1 km	MPC · JPL
424042	2007 AV_{28}	—	January 10, 2007	Charleston	Astronomical Research Observatory	MAS	660 m	MPC · JPL
424043	2007 BA_{4}	—	October 23, 2006	Mount Lemmon	Mount Lemmon Survey	·	1.2 km	MPC · JPL
424044	2007 BZ_{5}	—	January 17, 2007	Palomar	NEAT	·	2.2 km	MPC · JPL
424045	2007 BC_{7}	—	January 10, 2007	Kitt Peak	Spacewatch	·	890 m	MPC · JPL
424046	2007 BU_{11}	—	January 17, 2007	Kitt Peak	Spacewatch	·	1.4 km	MPC · JPL
424047	2007 BE_{25}	—	December 13, 2006	Mount Lemmon	Mount Lemmon Survey	·	1.2 km	MPC · JPL
424048	2007 BH_{35}	—	January 10, 2007	Kitt Peak	Spacewatch	NYS	1.3 km	MPC · JPL
424049	2007 BW_{40}	—	January 24, 2007	Catalina	CSS	·	1.2 km	MPC · JPL
424050	2007 BE_{42}	—	January 24, 2007	Catalina	CSS	H	630 m	MPC · JPL
424051	2007 BE_{43}	—	January 24, 2007	Mount Lemmon	Mount Lemmon Survey	·	1.3 km	MPC · JPL
424052	2007 BT_{55}	—	December 21, 2006	Kitt Peak	Spacewatch	(5)	1.2 km	MPC · JPL
424053	2007 BE_{63}	—	January 27, 2007	Mount Lemmon	Mount Lemmon Survey	·	960 m	MPC · JPL
424054	2007 BP_{63}	—	January 27, 2007	Kitt Peak	Spacewatch	·	1.1 km	MPC · JPL
424055	2007 BG_{71}	—	January 28, 2007	Mount Lemmon	Mount Lemmon Survey	·	1.3 km	MPC · JPL
424056	2007 BV_{80}	—	January 24, 2007	Mount Lemmon	Mount Lemmon Survey	·	1.2 km	MPC · JPL
424057	2007 BZ_{101}	—	January 27, 2007	Catalina	CSS	·	1.4 km	MPC · JPL
424058	2007 BL_{102}	—	January 27, 2007	Kitt Peak	Spacewatch	·	1.8 km	MPC · JPL
424059	2007 CU_{13}	—	January 26, 2007	Kitt Peak	Spacewatch	·	1.1 km	MPC · JPL
424060	2007 CV_{13}	—	February 7, 2007	Kitt Peak	Spacewatch	·	1.3 km	MPC · JPL
424061	2007 CT_{32}	—	January 27, 2007	Mount Lemmon	Mount Lemmon Survey	·	2.5 km	MPC · JPL
424062	2007 CE_{45}	—	November 24, 2006	Mount Lemmon	Mount Lemmon Survey	·	1.6 km	MPC · JPL
424063	2007 CP_{46}	—	February 8, 2007	Mount Lemmon	Mount Lemmon Survey	·	1.8 km	MPC · JPL
424064	2007 CQ_{54}	—	February 15, 2007	Charleston	Astronomical Research Observatory	·	690 m	MPC · JPL
424065	2007 CF_{63}	—	February 15, 2007	Palomar	NEAT	H	690 m	MPC · JPL
424066	2007 CM_{63}	—	January 28, 2007	Mount Lemmon	Mount Lemmon Survey	H	680 m	MPC · JPL
424067	2007 CJ_{65}	—	January 27, 2007	Mount Lemmon	Mount Lemmon Survey	·	1.4 km	MPC · JPL
424068	2007 DL_{1}	—	December 15, 2006	Mount Lemmon	Mount Lemmon Survey	·	1.1 km	MPC · JPL
424069	2007 DV_{1}	—	February 16, 2007	Mount Lemmon	Mount Lemmon Survey	(5)	930 m	MPC · JPL
424070	2007 DB_{2}	—	February 16, 2007	Mount Lemmon	Mount Lemmon Survey	·	1.3 km	MPC · JPL
424071	2007 DA_{11}	—	February 17, 2007	Kitt Peak	Spacewatch	EUN	1.3 km	MPC · JPL
424072	2007 DF_{16}	—	February 17, 2007	Kitt Peak	Spacewatch	·	1.4 km	MPC · JPL
424073	2007 DY_{18}	—	January 28, 2007	Mount Lemmon	Mount Lemmon Survey	·	1.2 km	MPC · JPL
424074	2007 DA_{21}	—	February 17, 2007	Kitt Peak	Spacewatch	·	1.4 km	MPC · JPL
424075	2007 DZ_{22}	—	January 27, 2007	Mount Lemmon	Mount Lemmon Survey	·	1.4 km	MPC · JPL
424076	2007 DV_{27}	—	February 17, 2007	Kitt Peak	Spacewatch	·	1.1 km	MPC · JPL
424077	2007 DR_{30}	—	February 17, 2007	Kitt Peak	Spacewatch	(5)	1.1 km	MPC · JPL
424078	2007 DN_{31}	—	February 17, 2007	Kitt Peak	Spacewatch	·	1.4 km	MPC · JPL
424079	2007 DZ_{31}	—	February 17, 2007	Kitt Peak	Spacewatch	·	1.3 km	MPC · JPL
424080	2007 DU_{35}	—	February 17, 2007	Kitt Peak	Spacewatch	·	1.7 km	MPC · JPL
424081	2007 DS_{39}	—	February 9, 2007	Kitt Peak	Spacewatch	·	1.5 km	MPC · JPL
424082	2007 DY_{39}	—	December 13, 2006	Kitt Peak	Spacewatch	·	1.2 km	MPC · JPL
424083	2007 DR_{40}	—	February 21, 2007	Catalina	CSS	·	2.0 km	MPC · JPL
424084	2007 DN_{48}	—	January 28, 2007	Mount Lemmon	Mount Lemmon Survey	H	570 m	MPC · JPL
424085	2007 DP_{53}	—	February 19, 2007	Mount Lemmon	Mount Lemmon Survey	·	2.1 km	MPC · JPL
424086	2007 DY_{71}	—	February 21, 2007	Kitt Peak	Spacewatch	·	1.2 km	MPC · JPL
424087	2007 DU_{73}	—	February 21, 2007	Kitt Peak	Spacewatch	(5)	780 m	MPC · JPL
424088	2007 DQ_{82}	—	February 23, 2007	Catalina	CSS	H	690 m	MPC · JPL
424089	2007 DU_{103}	—	February 25, 2007	Mount Lemmon	Mount Lemmon Survey	AMO +1km	2.3 km	MPC · JPL
424090	2007 DH_{104}	—	February 26, 2007	Catalina	CSS	H	670 m	MPC · JPL
424091	2007 DO_{109}	—	February 17, 2007	Kitt Peak	Spacewatch	·	1.7 km	MPC · JPL
424092	2007 DW_{109}	—	February 23, 2007	Mount Lemmon	Mount Lemmon Survey	·	1.1 km	MPC · JPL
424093	2007 DF_{112}	—	February 26, 2007	Mount Lemmon	Mount Lemmon Survey	·	1.4 km	MPC · JPL
424094	2007 EC_{9}	—	March 9, 2007	Mount Lemmon	Mount Lemmon Survey	·	1.0 km	MPC · JPL
424095	2007 EP_{10}	—	February 25, 2007	Mount Lemmon	Mount Lemmon Survey	·	1.3 km	MPC · JPL
424096	2007 EJ_{11}	—	February 8, 2007	Kitt Peak	Spacewatch	·	1.2 km	MPC · JPL
424097	2007 EQ_{12}	—	March 9, 2007	Palomar	NEAT	·	920 m	MPC · JPL
424098	2007 EY_{12}	—	February 17, 2007	Kitt Peak	Spacewatch	·	1.8 km	MPC · JPL
424099	2007 EU_{16}	—	March 9, 2007	Kitt Peak	Spacewatch	·	1.2 km	MPC · JPL
424100	2007 EO_{19}	—	March 10, 2007	Mount Lemmon	Mount Lemmon Survey	·	940 m	MPC · JPL

== 424101–424200 ==
back to top

Designation			Discovery			Properties		Ref
Permanent	Provisional	Named after	Date	Site	Discoverer(s)	Category	Diam.	Ref
424101	2007 ER_{23}	—	March 10, 2007	Mount Lemmon	Mount Lemmon Survey	·	1.6 km	MPC · JPL
424102	2007 EB_{27}	—	March 11, 2007	Altschwendt	W. Ries	L5	8.6 km	MPC · JPL
424103	2007 EO_{27}	—	August 28, 2005	Kitt Peak	Spacewatch	·	1.1 km	MPC · JPL
424104	2007 ES_{43}	—	March 9, 2007	Kitt Peak	Spacewatch	H	520 m	MPC · JPL
424105	2007 EQ_{46}	—	March 9, 2007	Mount Lemmon	Mount Lemmon Survey	·	1.2 km	MPC · JPL
424106	2007 EU_{60}	—	February 9, 2007	Kitt Peak	Spacewatch	MAR	1.1 km	MPC · JPL
424107	2007 EH_{66}	—	March 10, 2007	Kitt Peak	Spacewatch	·	960 m	MPC · JPL
424108	2007 EB_{72}	—	March 10, 2007	Kitt Peak	Spacewatch	·	780 m	MPC · JPL
424109	2007 EM_{83}	—	March 12, 2007	Kitt Peak	Spacewatch	·	1.4 km	MPC · JPL
424110	2007 EF_{91}	—	March 9, 2007	Mount Lemmon	Mount Lemmon Survey	·	1.5 km	MPC · JPL
424111	2007 EZ_{92}	—	March 10, 2007	Mount Lemmon	Mount Lemmon Survey	·	700 m	MPC · JPL
424112	2007 EP_{94}	—	March 10, 2007	Mount Lemmon	Mount Lemmon Survey	·	1.2 km	MPC · JPL
424113	2007 ER_{97}	—	March 11, 2007	Kitt Peak	Spacewatch	·	930 m	MPC · JPL
424114	2007 EU_{102}	—	March 11, 2007	Kitt Peak	Spacewatch	·	800 m	MPC · JPL
424115	2007 EP_{107}	—	March 11, 2007	Kitt Peak	Spacewatch	·	1.9 km	MPC · JPL
424116	2007 EU_{111}	—	March 11, 2007	Kitt Peak	Spacewatch	·	2.0 km	MPC · JPL
424117	2007 EG_{113}	—	January 27, 2007	Mount Lemmon	Mount Lemmon Survey	·	1.2 km	MPC · JPL
424118	2007 EL_{117}	—	March 13, 2007	Mount Lemmon	Mount Lemmon Survey	EUN	1.2 km	MPC · JPL
424119	2007 EJ_{119}	—	March 13, 2007	Mount Lemmon	Mount Lemmon Survey	·	1.0 km	MPC · JPL
424120	2007 ET_{119}	—	March 13, 2007	Mount Lemmon	Mount Lemmon Survey	·	840 m	MPC · JPL
424121	2007 EB_{138}	—	March 11, 2007	Kitt Peak	Spacewatch	·	1.4 km	MPC · JPL
424122	2007 EP_{144}	—	March 12, 2007	Mount Lemmon	Mount Lemmon Survey	·	1.9 km	MPC · JPL
424123	2007 EL_{147}	—	February 26, 2007	Mount Lemmon	Mount Lemmon Survey	·	1.8 km	MPC · JPL
424124	2007 ER_{150}	—	March 12, 2007	Mount Lemmon	Mount Lemmon Survey	·	2.1 km	MPC · JPL
424125	2007 ES_{172}	—	March 14, 2007	Kitt Peak	Spacewatch	·	2.0 km	MPC · JPL
424126	2007 EY_{175}	—	March 14, 2007	Kitt Peak	Spacewatch	·	2.4 km	MPC · JPL
424127	2007 EL_{178}	—	March 14, 2007	Kitt Peak	Spacewatch	·	2.5 km	MPC · JPL
424128	2007 EY_{187}	—	March 15, 2007	Catalina	CSS	·	1.6 km	MPC · JPL
424129	2007 EY_{205}	—	March 12, 2007	Mount Lemmon	Mount Lemmon Survey	JUN	1.2 km	MPC · JPL
424130	2007 EG_{221}	—	March 14, 2007	Mount Lemmon	Mount Lemmon Survey	·	1.9 km	MPC · JPL
424131	2007 FZ	—	November 27, 2006	Mount Lemmon	Mount Lemmon Survey	(194)	1.6 km	MPC · JPL
424132	2007 FZ_{5}	—	September 18, 1995	Kitt Peak	Spacewatch	·	1.8 km	MPC · JPL
424133	2007 FA_{13}	—	March 19, 2007	Catalina	CSS	·	2.5 km	MPC · JPL
424134	2007 FK_{22}	—	February 26, 2007	Mount Lemmon	Mount Lemmon Survey	·	1.6 km	MPC · JPL
424135	2007 FV_{23}	—	March 20, 2007	Kitt Peak	Spacewatch	·	1.7 km	MPC · JPL
424136	2007 FS_{27}	—	March 20, 2007	Mount Lemmon	Mount Lemmon Survey	·	1.0 km	MPC · JPL
424137	2007 FU_{36}	—	March 26, 2007	Kitt Peak	Spacewatch	WIT	850 m	MPC · JPL
424138	2007 FN_{38}	—	March 26, 2007	Catalina	CSS	H	700 m	MPC · JPL
424139	2007 FC_{41}	—	March 20, 2007	Anderson Mesa	LONEOS	·	2.6 km	MPC · JPL
424140	2007 FL_{46}	—	March 26, 2007	Mount Lemmon	Mount Lemmon Survey	·	1.2 km	MPC · JPL
424141	2007 GN	—	April 7, 2007	Mount Lemmon	Mount Lemmon Survey	·	1.3 km	MPC · JPL
424142	2007 GQ_{1}	—	March 11, 2007	Mount Lemmon	Mount Lemmon Survey	·	1.5 km	MPC · JPL
424143	2007 GV_{2}	—	April 7, 2007	Mount Lemmon	Mount Lemmon Survey	·	1.8 km	MPC · JPL
424144	2007 GM_{6}	—	March 16, 2007	Mount Lemmon	Mount Lemmon Survey	·	1.5 km	MPC · JPL
424145	2007 GY_{14}	—	April 11, 2007	Catalina	CSS	·	1.9 km	MPC · JPL
424146	2007 GC_{16}	—	March 17, 2007	Anderson Mesa	LONEOS	·	2.2 km	MPC · JPL
424147	2007 GU_{16}	—	April 11, 2007	Kitt Peak	Spacewatch	·	1.7 km	MPC · JPL
424148	2007 GY_{22}	—	April 11, 2007	Mount Lemmon	Mount Lemmon Survey	MRX	940 m	MPC · JPL
424149	2007 GR_{23}	—	April 11, 2007	Mount Lemmon	Mount Lemmon Survey	·	1.8 km	MPC · JPL
424150	2007 GH_{28}	—	February 25, 2007	Mount Lemmon	Mount Lemmon Survey	·	1.8 km	MPC · JPL
424151	2007 GF_{35}	—	April 14, 2007	Kitt Peak	Spacewatch	·	1.9 km	MPC · JPL
424152	2007 GH_{41}	—	April 14, 2007	Kitt Peak	Spacewatch	·	1.9 km	MPC · JPL
424153	2007 GY_{41}	—	April 14, 2007	Kitt Peak	Spacewatch	·	1.2 km	MPC · JPL
424154	2007 GW_{42}	—	April 14, 2007	Kitt Peak	Spacewatch	·	1.5 km	MPC · JPL
424155	2007 GT_{45}	—	April 14, 2007	Kitt Peak	Spacewatch	·	2.0 km	MPC · JPL
424156	2007 GP_{57}	—	March 15, 2007	Kitt Peak	Spacewatch	·	1.2 km	MPC · JPL
424157	2007 GY_{67}	—	April 15, 2007	Kitt Peak	Spacewatch	·	1.0 km	MPC · JPL
424158	2007 GX_{74}	—	April 14, 2007	Catalina	CSS	·	2.0 km	MPC · JPL
424159	2007 HO_{5}	—	April 14, 2007	Kitt Peak	Spacewatch	·	1.7 km	MPC · JPL
424160	2007 HP_{5}	—	February 26, 2007	Mount Lemmon	Mount Lemmon Survey	EUN	1.1 km	MPC · JPL
424161	2007 HG_{6}	—	April 16, 2007	Catalina	CSS	·	1.5 km	MPC · JPL
424162	2007 HL_{14}	—	April 19, 2007	Kitt Peak	Spacewatch	·	1.4 km	MPC · JPL
424163	2007 HX_{21}	—	April 18, 2007	Kitt Peak	Spacewatch	·	1.9 km	MPC · JPL
424164	2007 HG_{23}	—	April 18, 2007	Kitt Peak	Spacewatch	·	1.1 km	MPC · JPL
424165	2007 HX_{36}	—	April 19, 2007	Kitt Peak	Spacewatch	·	1.2 km	MPC · JPL
424166	2007 HB_{40}	—	April 20, 2007	Mount Lemmon	Mount Lemmon Survey	·	1.8 km	MPC · JPL
424167	2007 HR_{43}	—	April 22, 2007	Mount Lemmon	Mount Lemmon Survey	AGN	1.1 km	MPC · JPL
424168	2007 HY_{43}	—	April 22, 2007	Mount Lemmon	Mount Lemmon Survey	·	1.7 km	MPC · JPL
424169	2007 HO_{44}	—	April 18, 2007	Mount Lemmon	Mount Lemmon Survey	·	900 m	MPC · JPL
424170	2007 HJ_{45}	—	April 18, 2007	Kitt Peak	Spacewatch	·	1.9 km	MPC · JPL
424171	2007 HC_{55}	—	April 22, 2007	Kitt Peak	Spacewatch	·	2.6 km	MPC · JPL
424172	2007 HQ_{57}	—	April 22, 2007	Mount Lemmon	Mount Lemmon Survey	JUN	1.3 km	MPC · JPL
424173	2007 HY_{57}	—	April 23, 2007	Kitt Peak	Spacewatch	·	1.0 km	MPC · JPL
424174	2007 HX_{58}	—	April 23, 2007	Catalina	CSS	·	1.3 km	MPC · JPL
424175	2007 HD_{74}	—	April 22, 2007	Kitt Peak	Spacewatch	·	1.0 km	MPC · JPL
424176	2007 HA_{77}	—	April 23, 2007	Kitt Peak	Spacewatch	·	1.6 km	MPC · JPL
424177	2007 HZ_{85}	—	April 24, 2007	Kitt Peak	Spacewatch	·	2.9 km	MPC · JPL
424178	2007 HZ_{94}	—	April 19, 2007	Mount Lemmon	Mount Lemmon Survey	·	1.4 km	MPC · JPL
424179	2007 HX_{97}	—	April 25, 2007	Mount Lemmon	Mount Lemmon Survey	·	2.4 km	MPC · JPL
424180	2007 JL	—	April 25, 2007	Mount Lemmon	Mount Lemmon Survey	ADE	2.0 km	MPC · JPL
424181	2007 JP	—	May 7, 2007	Mount Lemmon	Mount Lemmon Survey	·	1.9 km	MPC · JPL
424182	2007 JD_{3}	—	April 25, 2007	Kitt Peak	Spacewatch	EUN	1.3 km	MPC · JPL
424183	2007 JD_{8}	—	April 18, 2007	Mount Lemmon	Mount Lemmon Survey	·	1.5 km	MPC · JPL
424184	2007 JX_{8}	—	October 18, 2003	Kitt Peak	Spacewatch	·	2.2 km	MPC · JPL
424185	2007 JB_{11}	—	April 18, 2007	Mount Lemmon	Mount Lemmon Survey	·	1.3 km	MPC · JPL
424186	2007 JU_{19}	—	April 16, 2007	Catalina	CSS	·	2.4 km	MPC · JPL
424187	2007 JT_{21}	—	April 14, 2007	Kitt Peak	Spacewatch	·	1.6 km	MPC · JPL
424188	2007 JN_{22}	—	May 10, 2007	Mount Lemmon	Mount Lemmon Survey	·	3.3 km	MPC · JPL
424189	2007 JD_{24}	—	April 24, 2007	Mount Lemmon	Mount Lemmon Survey	·	1.7 km	MPC · JPL
424190	2007 JF_{28}	—	April 15, 2007	Kitt Peak	Spacewatch	·	2.2 km	MPC · JPL
424191	2007 JF_{40}	—	April 15, 2007	Catalina	CSS	·	1.9 km	MPC · JPL
424192	2007 JB_{43}	—	March 15, 2007	Mount Lemmon	Mount Lemmon Survey	·	1.2 km	MPC · JPL
424193	2007 JR_{45}	—	May 11, 2007	Mount Lemmon	Mount Lemmon Survey	EOS	1.8 km	MPC · JPL
424194	2007 LJ_{2}	—	June 7, 2007	Kitt Peak	Spacewatch	·	2.5 km	MPC · JPL
424195	2007 LN_{12}	—	June 9, 2007	Kitt Peak	Spacewatch	·	1.9 km	MPC · JPL
424196	2007 LX_{15}	—	May 11, 2007	Kitt Peak	Spacewatch	·	1.9 km	MPC · JPL
424197	2007 LG_{32}	—	June 15, 2007	Kitt Peak	Spacewatch	·	2.5 km	MPC · JPL
424198	2007 LX_{37}	—	June 10, 2007	Siding Spring	SSS	·	1.7 km	MPC · JPL
424199	2007 MY_{6}	—	April 16, 2007	Catalina	CSS	·	1.5 km	MPC · JPL
424200 Tonicelia	2007 NV_{1}	Tonicelia	July 12, 2007	La Sagra	OAM	·	3.5 km	MPC · JPL

== 424201–424300 ==
back to top

Designation			Discovery			Properties		Ref
Permanent	Provisional	Named after	Date	Site	Discoverer(s)	Category	Diam.	Ref
424201	2007 OH_{7}	—	July 18, 2007	Catalina	CSS	T_{j} (2.96)	4.8 km	MPC · JPL
424202	2007 PU_{9}	—	August 9, 2007	Socorro	LINEAR	·	3.3 km	MPC · JPL
424203	2007 PA_{25}	—	August 6, 2007	Reedy Creek	J. Broughton	·	3.5 km	MPC · JPL
424204	2007 PP_{27}	—	August 14, 2007	Altschwendt	W. Ries	ELF	4.6 km	MPC · JPL
424205	2007 PJ_{32}	—	August 8, 2007	Socorro	LINEAR	·	3.1 km	MPC · JPL
424206	2007 PB_{33}	—	August 9, 2007	Socorro	LINEAR	·	590 m	MPC · JPL
424207	2007 PL_{42}	—	August 15, 2007	Socorro	LINEAR	·	390 m	MPC · JPL
424208	2007 QY	—	August 17, 2007	Bisei SG Center	BATTeRS	·	4.8 km	MPC · JPL
424209	2007 QL_{10}	—	August 23, 2007	Kitt Peak	Spacewatch	·	1.9 km	MPC · JPL
424210	2007 QK_{16}	—	August 23, 2007	Kitt Peak	Spacewatch	·	5.4 km	MPC · JPL
424211	2007 QY_{17}	—	August 24, 2007	Kitt Peak	Spacewatch	·	3.4 km	MPC · JPL
424212	2007 RN_{4}	—	September 3, 2007	Catalina	CSS	·	2.7 km	MPC · JPL
424213	2007 RM_{10}	—	September 3, 2007	Catalina	CSS	LIX	3.8 km	MPC · JPL
424214	2007 RF_{36}	—	September 8, 2007	Anderson Mesa	LONEOS	·	790 m	MPC · JPL
424215	2007 RH_{39}	—	September 8, 2007	Mount Lemmon	Mount Lemmon Survey	·	640 m	MPC · JPL
424216	2007 RQ_{50}	—	May 7, 2005	Mount Lemmon	Mount Lemmon Survey	·	2.7 km	MPC · JPL
424217	2007 RO_{70}	—	September 10, 2007	Kitt Peak	Spacewatch	·	3.3 km	MPC · JPL
424218	2007 RP_{80}	—	September 10, 2007	Mount Lemmon	Mount Lemmon Survey	·	1.7 km	MPC · JPL
424219	2007 RG_{92}	—	September 10, 2007	Mount Lemmon	Mount Lemmon Survey	·	2.8 km	MPC · JPL
424220	2007 RR_{93}	—	September 10, 2007	Kitt Peak	Spacewatch	·	2.9 km	MPC · JPL
424221	2007 RN_{103}	—	September 11, 2007	Catalina	CSS	·	3.1 km	MPC · JPL
424222	2007 RS_{105}	—	September 11, 2007	Catalina	CSS	·	690 m	MPC · JPL
424223	2007 RM_{111}	—	September 11, 2007	Kitt Peak	Spacewatch	·	2.2 km	MPC · JPL
424224	2007 RT_{128}	—	March 11, 2005	Kitt Peak	Spacewatch	·	2.5 km	MPC · JPL
424225	2007 RY_{140}	—	September 12, 2007	Anderson Mesa	LONEOS	·	3.7 km	MPC · JPL
424226	2007 RR_{141}	—	September 13, 2007	Socorro	LINEAR	·	670 m	MPC · JPL
424227	2007 RK_{143}	—	September 14, 2007	Socorro	LINEAR	T_{j} (2.98)	3.7 km	MPC · JPL
424228	2007 RU_{146}	—	September 11, 2007	Catalina	CSS	·	3.5 km	MPC · JPL
424229	2007 RH_{150}	—	September 14, 2007	Catalina	CSS	·	680 m	MPC · JPL
424230	2007 RL_{158}	—	September 12, 2007	Catalina	CSS	·	3.8 km	MPC · JPL
424231	2007 RQ_{164}	—	September 10, 2007	Kitt Peak	Spacewatch	·	2.8 km	MPC · JPL
424232	2007 RX_{169}	—	September 10, 2007	Kitt Peak	Spacewatch	EOS	2.0 km	MPC · JPL
424233	2007 RA_{170}	—	September 10, 2007	Kitt Peak	Spacewatch	·	2.4 km	MPC · JPL
424234	2007 RG_{170}	—	August 10, 2007	Kitt Peak	Spacewatch	·	3.0 km	MPC · JPL
424235	2007 RR_{181}	—	September 11, 2007	Catalina	CSS	·	2.7 km	MPC · JPL
424236	2007 RQ_{194}	—	September 12, 2007	Kitt Peak	Spacewatch	·	580 m	MPC · JPL
424237	2007 RV_{198}	—	September 13, 2007	Catalina	CSS	·	3.2 km	MPC · JPL
424238	2007 RZ_{198}	—	September 13, 2007	Catalina	CSS	·	3.8 km	MPC · JPL
424239	2007 RB_{201}	—	September 13, 2007	Kitt Peak	Spacewatch	·	3.0 km	MPC · JPL
424240	2007 RV_{205}	—	September 10, 2007	Kitt Peak	Spacewatch	·	2.5 km	MPC · JPL
424241	2007 RN_{206}	—	September 10, 2007	Kitt Peak	Spacewatch	THM	2.2 km	MPC · JPL
424242	2007 RW_{214}	—	September 12, 2007	Kitt Peak	Spacewatch	·	940 m	MPC · JPL
424243	2007 RP_{217}	—	September 13, 2007	Kitt Peak	Spacewatch	·	1.9 km	MPC · JPL
424244	2007 RJ_{233}	—	September 12, 2007	Catalina	CSS	·	6.0 km	MPC · JPL
424245	2007 RA_{253}	—	September 13, 2007	Mount Lemmon	Mount Lemmon Survey	EOS	2.2 km	MPC · JPL
424246	2007 RD_{255}	—	September 10, 2007	Kitt Peak	Spacewatch	EOS	1.6 km	MPC · JPL
424247	2007 RC_{257}	—	September 14, 2007	Catalina	CSS	·	3.3 km	MPC · JPL
424248	2007 RK_{268}	—	September 15, 2007	Kitt Peak	Spacewatch	·	2.7 km	MPC · JPL
424249	2007 RN_{275}	—	September 6, 2007	Siding Spring	SSS	T_{j} (2.99)	3.8 km	MPC · JPL
424250	2007 RW_{283}	—	September 8, 2007	Anderson Mesa	LONEOS	·	2.6 km	MPC · JPL
424251	2007 RK_{286}	—	September 3, 2007	Catalina	CSS	·	3.6 km	MPC · JPL
424252	2007 RP_{287}	—	September 9, 2007	Kitt Peak	Spacewatch	·	3.7 km	MPC · JPL
424253	2007 RG_{299}	—	September 15, 2007	Kitt Peak	Spacewatch	·	520 m	MPC · JPL
424254	2007 RL_{299}	—	September 12, 2007	Catalina	CSS	·	3.2 km	MPC · JPL
424255	2007 RV_{302}	—	September 12, 2007	Mount Lemmon	Mount Lemmon Survey	THM	2.6 km	MPC · JPL
424256	2007 RM_{316}	—	September 9, 2007	Kitt Peak	Spacewatch	·	3.1 km	MPC · JPL
424257	2007 RH_{320}	—	September 13, 2007	Socorro	LINEAR	·	710 m	MPC · JPL
424258	2007 RD_{322}	—	September 10, 2007	Kitt Peak	Spacewatch	·	2.6 km	MPC · JPL
424259	2007 SY_{1}	—	September 19, 2007	Altschwendt	W. Ries	·	4.5 km	MPC · JPL
424260	2007 SQ_{8}	—	September 18, 2007	Kitt Peak	Spacewatch	·	2.9 km	MPC · JPL
424261	2007 SK_{9}	—	September 10, 2007	Kitt Peak	Spacewatch	·	2.1 km	MPC · JPL
424262	2007 ST_{12}	—	September 19, 2007	Kitt Peak	Spacewatch	·	3.0 km	MPC · JPL
424263	2007 SY_{12}	—	September 9, 2007	Kitt Peak	Spacewatch	·	2.7 km	MPC · JPL
424264	2007 SD_{14}	—	September 20, 2007	Catalina	CSS	(2076)	810 m	MPC · JPL
424265	2007 SW_{15}	—	September 30, 2007	Kitt Peak	Spacewatch	·	730 m	MPC · JPL
424266	2007 TW_{3}	—	October 5, 2007	Pla D'Arguines	R. Ferrando	·	2.6 km	MPC · JPL
424267	2007 TG_{4}	—	September 9, 2007	Mount Lemmon	Mount Lemmon Survey	EOS	2.0 km	MPC · JPL
424268	2007 TV_{15}	—	October 5, 2007	Kitt Peak	Spacewatch	·	730 m	MPC · JPL
424269	2007 TO_{24}	—	October 25, 1997	Kitt Peak	Spacewatch	TEL	1.8 km	MPC · JPL
424270	2007 TH_{27}	—	October 4, 2007	Kitt Peak	Spacewatch	·	530 m	MPC · JPL
424271	2007 TE_{36}	—	October 3, 2007	Purple Mountain	PMO NEO Survey Program	·	980 m	MPC · JPL
424272	2007 TB_{55}	—	October 4, 2007	Kitt Peak	Spacewatch	EOS	1.9 km	MPC · JPL
424273	2007 TN_{59}	—	September 10, 2007	Kitt Peak	Spacewatch	·	2.5 km	MPC · JPL
424274	2007 TU_{74}	—	October 15, 2007	Bisei SG Center	BATTeRS	·	550 m	MPC · JPL
424275	2007 TG_{84}	—	September 12, 2007	Mount Lemmon	Mount Lemmon Survey	·	2.4 km	MPC · JPL
424276	2007 TT_{90}	—	October 8, 2007	Mount Lemmon	Mount Lemmon Survey	VER	3.1 km	MPC · JPL
424277	2007 TF_{101}	—	September 12, 2007	Mount Lemmon	Mount Lemmon Survey	VER	2.6 km	MPC · JPL
424278	2007 TQ_{101}	—	October 8, 2007	Mount Lemmon	Mount Lemmon Survey	·	770 m	MPC · JPL
424279	2007 TF_{102}	—	October 8, 2007	Mount Lemmon	Mount Lemmon Survey	·	2.4 km	MPC · JPL
424280	2007 TG_{116}	—	October 8, 2007	Purple Mountain	PMO NEO Survey Program	·	800 m	MPC · JPL
424281	2007 TH_{120}	—	October 9, 2007	Lulin	LUSS	·	660 m	MPC · JPL
424282	2007 TG_{124}	—	October 6, 2007	Kitt Peak	Spacewatch	·	3.2 km	MPC · JPL
424283	2007 TA_{131}	—	October 7, 2007	Mount Lemmon	Mount Lemmon Survey	THM	2.2 km	MPC · JPL
424284	2007 TO_{131}	—	October 7, 2007	Mount Lemmon	Mount Lemmon Survey	THM	2.3 km	MPC · JPL
424285	2007 TQ_{132}	—	October 7, 2007	Mount Lemmon	Mount Lemmon Survey	·	2.8 km	MPC · JPL
424286	2007 TP_{135}	—	August 24, 2007	Kitt Peak	Spacewatch	·	2.4 km	MPC · JPL
424287	2007 TU_{142}	—	October 14, 2007	Dauban	Chante-Perdrix	·	770 m	MPC · JPL
424288	2007 TH_{144}	—	September 11, 2007	Mount Lemmon	Mount Lemmon Survey	EOS	2.5 km	MPC · JPL
424289	2007 TT_{159}	—	September 10, 2007	Catalina	CSS	·	740 m	MPC · JPL
424290	2007 TC_{161}	—	October 11, 2007	Dauban	Chante-Perdrix	EOS	2.4 km	MPC · JPL
424291	2007 TJ_{167}	—	October 12, 2007	Socorro	LINEAR	·	650 m	MPC · JPL
424292	2007 TW_{170}	—	October 12, 2007	Dauban	Chante-Perdrix	·	5.7 km	MPC · JPL
424293	2007 TW_{213}	—	October 7, 2007	Kitt Peak	Spacewatch	·	670 m	MPC · JPL
424294	2007 TG_{220}	—	September 13, 2007	Mount Lemmon	Mount Lemmon Survey	VER	2.5 km	MPC · JPL
424295	2007 TC_{243}	—	October 8, 2007	Catalina	CSS	·	2.5 km	MPC · JPL
424296	2007 TY_{254}	—	October 9, 2007	Mount Lemmon	Mount Lemmon Survey	·	3.0 km	MPC · JPL
424297	2007 TH_{256}	—	October 10, 2007	Kitt Peak	Spacewatch	·	3.6 km	MPC · JPL
424298	2007 TV_{263}	—	October 11, 2007	Kitt Peak	Spacewatch	·	5.4 km	MPC · JPL
424299	2007 TG_{264}	—	October 11, 2007	Kitt Peak	Spacewatch	·	2.6 km	MPC · JPL
424300	2007 TW_{266}	—	October 9, 2007	Kitt Peak	Spacewatch	THM	2.3 km	MPC · JPL

== 424301–424400 ==
back to top

Designation			Discovery			Properties		Ref
Permanent	Provisional	Named after	Date	Site	Discoverer(s)	Category	Diam.	Ref
424301	2007 TH_{269}	—	October 9, 2007	Kitt Peak	Spacewatch	THM	1.9 km	MPC · JPL
424302	2007 TB_{273}	—	October 9, 2007	Kitt Peak	Spacewatch	·	3.9 km	MPC · JPL
424303	2007 TH_{285}	—	October 9, 2007	Mount Lemmon	Mount Lemmon Survey	·	2.8 km	MPC · JPL
424304	2007 TP_{285}	—	September 10, 2007	Kitt Peak	Spacewatch	EOS	1.9 km	MPC · JPL
424305	2007 TH_{289}	—	October 11, 2007	Mount Lemmon	Mount Lemmon Survey	·	3.3 km	MPC · JPL
424306	2007 TH_{296}	—	October 10, 2007	Mount Lemmon	Mount Lemmon Survey	·	3.5 km	MPC · JPL
424307	2007 TG_{314}	—	October 11, 2007	Mount Lemmon	Mount Lemmon Survey	·	2.9 km	MPC · JPL
424308	2007 TF_{315}	—	October 4, 2007	Kitt Peak	Spacewatch	·	2.7 km	MPC · JPL
424309	2007 TQ_{317}	—	October 12, 2007	Kitt Peak	Spacewatch	·	600 m	MPC · JPL
424310	2007 TG_{324}	—	September 25, 2007	Mount Lemmon	Mount Lemmon Survey	·	3.1 km	MPC · JPL
424311	2007 TG_{335}	—	October 11, 2007	Kitt Peak	Spacewatch	·	540 m	MPC · JPL
424312	2007 TW_{363}	—	October 14, 2007	Mount Lemmon	Mount Lemmon Survey	·	2.9 km	MPC · JPL
424313	2007 TH_{370}	—	October 12, 2007	Anderson Mesa	LONEOS	·	1.2 km	MPC · JPL
424314	2007 TP_{372}	—	October 13, 2007	Anderson Mesa	LONEOS	·	3.5 km	MPC · JPL
424315	2007 TP_{404}	—	October 15, 2007	Kitt Peak	Spacewatch	·	790 m	MPC · JPL
424316	2007 TN_{414}	—	October 10, 2007	Catalina	CSS	·	2.6 km	MPC · JPL
424317	2007 TY_{427}	—	October 10, 2007	Kitt Peak	Spacewatch	·	3.2 km	MPC · JPL
424318	2007 TK_{430}	—	October 9, 2007	Kitt Peak	Spacewatch	EMA	4.1 km	MPC · JPL
424319	2007 TC_{432}	—	October 4, 2007	Mount Lemmon	Mount Lemmon Survey	·	4.5 km	MPC · JPL
424320	2007 TZ_{432}	—	October 8, 2007	Catalina	CSS	·	3.3 km	MPC · JPL
424321	2007 TM_{446}	—	October 9, 2007	Kitt Peak	Spacewatch	·	610 m	MPC · JPL
424322	2007 UR_{12}	—	October 16, 2007	Catalina	CSS	·	3.2 km	MPC · JPL
424323	2007 UG_{15}	—	October 18, 2007	Mount Lemmon	Mount Lemmon Survey	·	3.1 km	MPC · JPL
424324	2007 UM_{15}	—	October 18, 2007	Mount Lemmon	Mount Lemmon Survey	·	2.4 km	MPC · JPL
424325	2007 UC_{33}	—	October 16, 2007	Catalina	CSS	·	2.7 km	MPC · JPL
424326	2007 UL_{38}	—	September 18, 2007	Catalina	CSS	·	2.3 km	MPC · JPL
424327	2007 UW_{43}	—	September 14, 2007	Mount Lemmon	Mount Lemmon Survey	·	2.8 km	MPC · JPL
424328	2007 UG_{57}	—	October 30, 2007	Mount Lemmon	Mount Lemmon Survey	·	2.7 km	MPC · JPL
424329	2007 UJ_{57}	—	October 30, 2007	Mount Lemmon	Mount Lemmon Survey	·	600 m	MPC · JPL
424330	2007 UH_{58}	—	April 12, 2005	Mount Lemmon	Mount Lemmon Survey	·	3.1 km	MPC · JPL
424331	2007 UY_{62}	—	September 13, 2007	Mount Lemmon	Mount Lemmon Survey	·	2.7 km	MPC · JPL
424332	2007 UK_{81}	—	September 12, 2007	Mount Lemmon	Mount Lemmon Survey	·	2.4 km	MPC · JPL
424333	2007 UE_{99}	—	October 30, 2007	Kitt Peak	Spacewatch	·	720 m	MPC · JPL
424334	2007 UU_{99}	—	October 30, 2007	Kitt Peak	Spacewatch	·	3.8 km	MPC · JPL
424335	2007 UE_{102}	—	October 30, 2007	Kitt Peak	Spacewatch	EOS	2.0 km	MPC · JPL
424336	2007 UW_{103}	—	October 30, 2007	Kitt Peak	Spacewatch	·	710 m	MPC · JPL
424337	2007 UM_{105}	—	October 24, 2007	Mount Lemmon	Mount Lemmon Survey	(2076)	830 m	MPC · JPL
424338	2007 UG_{116}	—	October 31, 2007	Kitt Peak	Spacewatch	·	640 m	MPC · JPL
424339	2007 UZ_{116}	—	October 30, 2007	Mount Lemmon	Mount Lemmon Survey	·	520 m	MPC · JPL
424340	2007 UA_{121}	—	October 30, 2007	Mount Lemmon	Mount Lemmon Survey	·	560 m	MPC · JPL
424341	2007 UD_{131}	—	October 20, 2007	Mount Lemmon	Mount Lemmon Survey	EOS	2.2 km	MPC · JPL
424342	2007 UL_{135}	—	October 20, 2007	Kitt Peak	Spacewatch	·	510 m	MPC · JPL
424343	2007 UL_{136}	—	October 19, 2007	Catalina	CSS	·	2.7 km	MPC · JPL
424344	2007 VX_{23}	—	November 2, 2007	Mount Lemmon	Mount Lemmon Survey	·	2.6 km	MPC · JPL
424345	2007 VY_{48}	—	November 1, 2007	Kitt Peak	Spacewatch	·	930 m	MPC · JPL
424346	2007 VP_{49}	—	November 20, 2004	Kitt Peak	Spacewatch	·	890 m	MPC · JPL
424347	2007 VU_{50}	—	November 1, 2007	Kitt Peak	Spacewatch	·	3.1 km	MPC · JPL
424348	2007 VO_{52}	—	October 20, 2007	Mount Lemmon	Mount Lemmon Survey	·	740 m	MPC · JPL
424349	2007 VX_{61}	—	November 1, 2007	Kitt Peak	Spacewatch	·	780 m	MPC · JPL
424350	2007 VR_{79}	—	November 3, 2007	Kitt Peak	Spacewatch	·	4.8 km	MPC · JPL
424351	2007 VS_{114}	—	November 3, 2007	Kitt Peak	Spacewatch	·	4.0 km	MPC · JPL
424352	2007 VJ_{120}	—	September 14, 2007	Mount Lemmon	Mount Lemmon Survey	·	3.2 km	MPC · JPL
424353	2007 VX_{127}	—	November 1, 2007	Mount Lemmon	Mount Lemmon Survey	VER	3.1 km	MPC · JPL
424354	2007 VA_{129}	—	November 1, 2007	Mount Lemmon	Mount Lemmon Survey	·	2.9 km	MPC · JPL
424355	2007 VU_{145}	—	November 4, 2007	Kitt Peak	Spacewatch	·	730 m	MPC · JPL
424356	2007 VE_{146}	—	November 4, 2007	Kitt Peak	Spacewatch	·	3.4 km	MPC · JPL
424357	2007 VM_{151}	—	November 7, 2007	Kitt Peak	Spacewatch	·	3.0 km	MPC · JPL
424358	2007 VQ_{159}	—	November 5, 2007	Kitt Peak	Spacewatch	·	890 m	MPC · JPL
424359	2007 VE_{165}	—	November 5, 2007	Kitt Peak	Spacewatch	THM	2.1 km	MPC · JPL
424360	2007 VA_{180}	—	October 12, 2007	Kitt Peak	Spacewatch	·	570 m	MPC · JPL
424361	2007 VF_{181}	—	November 7, 2007	Catalina	CSS	·	2.9 km	MPC · JPL
424362	2007 VT_{185}	—	November 9, 2007	Mount Lemmon	Mount Lemmon Survey	VER	2.9 km	MPC · JPL
424363	2007 VB_{189}	—	November 13, 2007	Bisei SG Center	BATTeRS	·	660 m	MPC · JPL
424364	2007 VW_{197}	—	November 8, 2007	Mount Lemmon	Mount Lemmon Survey	·	670 m	MPC · JPL
424365	2007 VC_{220}	—	November 9, 2007	Kitt Peak	Spacewatch	·	740 m	MPC · JPL
424366	2007 VE_{229}	—	November 7, 2007	Kitt Peak	Spacewatch	HYG	2.9 km	MPC · JPL
424367	2007 VD_{238}	—	October 9, 2007	Kitt Peak	Spacewatch	·	3.1 km	MPC · JPL
424368	2007 VB_{244}	—	November 2, 2007	Kitt Peak	Spacewatch	·	870 m	MPC · JPL
424369	2007 VQ_{250}	—	November 8, 2007	Mount Lemmon	Mount Lemmon Survey	·	600 m	MPC · JPL
424370	2007 VC_{256}	—	November 13, 2007	Mount Lemmon	Mount Lemmon Survey	VER	2.4 km	MPC · JPL
424371	2007 VU_{257}	—	November 15, 2007	Anderson Mesa	LONEOS	·	3.1 km	MPC · JPL
424372	2007 VT_{268}	—	November 12, 2007	Socorro	LINEAR	·	800 m	MPC · JPL
424373	2007 VY_{280}	—	November 14, 2007	Kitt Peak	Spacewatch	·	620 m	MPC · JPL
424374	2007 VW_{305}	—	November 5, 2007	Mount Lemmon	Mount Lemmon Survey	·	1.2 km	MPC · JPL
424375	2007 VZ_{311}	—	November 1, 2007	Kitt Peak	Spacewatch	·	4.1 km	MPC · JPL
424376	2007 VQ_{326}	—	November 4, 2007	Kitt Peak	Spacewatch	·	810 m	MPC · JPL
424377	2007 WF_{4}	—	November 18, 2007	Socorro	LINEAR	·	870 m	MPC · JPL
424378	2007 WY_{6}	—	November 18, 2007	Socorro	LINEAR	·	730 m	MPC · JPL
424379	2007 WA_{11}	—	November 17, 2007	Catalina	CSS	·	650 m	MPC · JPL
424380	2007 WO_{15}	—	September 15, 2007	Mount Lemmon	Mount Lemmon Survey	·	640 m	MPC · JPL
424381	2007 WO_{16}	—	March 7, 1995	Kitt Peak	Spacewatch	·	770 m	MPC · JPL
424382	2007 WC_{35}	—	November 19, 2007	Mount Lemmon	Mount Lemmon Survey	VER	4.0 km	MPC · JPL
424383	2007 WY_{39}	—	November 7, 2007	Catalina	CSS	(2076)	760 m	MPC · JPL
424384	2007 WV_{48}	—	November 20, 2007	Mount Lemmon	Mount Lemmon Survey	VER	2.4 km	MPC · JPL
424385	2007 WB_{53}	—	November 5, 2007	Kitt Peak	Spacewatch	·	930 m	MPC · JPL
424386	2007 WU_{61}	—	December 18, 2004	Mount Lemmon	Mount Lemmon Survey	V	630 m	MPC · JPL
424387	2007 XX_{10}	—	December 4, 2007	Catalina	CSS	·	700 m	MPC · JPL
424388	2007 XY_{15}	—	December 8, 2007	La Sagra	OAM	·	850 m	MPC · JPL
424389	2007 XS_{19}	—	December 12, 2007	Socorro	LINEAR	·	800 m	MPC · JPL
424390	2007 XW_{41}	—	December 5, 2007	Kitt Peak	Spacewatch	·	760 m	MPC · JPL
424391	2007 XO_{54}	—	December 14, 2007	Mount Lemmon	Mount Lemmon Survey	·	900 m	MPC · JPL
424392	2007 YJ	—	December 16, 2007	Mount Lemmon	Mount Lemmon Survey	APO	240 m	MPC · JPL
424393	2007 YP_{27}	—	November 7, 2007	Mount Lemmon	Mount Lemmon Survey	·	870 m	MPC · JPL
424394	2007 YW_{31}	—	December 5, 2007	Kitt Peak	Spacewatch	·	1.0 km	MPC · JPL
424395	2007 YG_{62}	—	December 30, 2007	Mount Lemmon	Mount Lemmon Survey	CYB	3.2 km	MPC · JPL
424396	2007 YT_{64}	—	December 19, 2007	Mount Lemmon	Mount Lemmon Survey	(2076)	690 m	MPC · JPL
424397	2007 YM_{67}	—	December 16, 2007	Mount Lemmon	Mount Lemmon Survey	(2076)	560 m	MPC · JPL
424398	2007 YV_{67}	—	December 18, 2007	Kitt Peak	Spacewatch	·	540 m	MPC · JPL
424399	2007 YX_{71}	—	December 18, 2007	Kitt Peak	Spacewatch	·	900 m	MPC · JPL
424400	2007 YP_{72}	—	December 18, 2007	Mount Lemmon	Mount Lemmon Survey	·	1.1 km	MPC · JPL

== 424401–424500 ==
back to top

Designation			Discovery			Properties		Ref
Permanent	Provisional	Named after	Date	Site	Discoverer(s)	Category	Diam.	Ref
424401	2008 AB_{9}	—	December 15, 2007	Mount Lemmon	Mount Lemmon Survey	·	760 m	MPC · JPL
424402	2008 AT_{9}	—	January 10, 2008	Mount Lemmon	Mount Lemmon Survey	·	1.3 km	MPC · JPL
424403	2008 AL_{23}	—	January 10, 2008	Mount Lemmon	Mount Lemmon Survey	NYS	660 m	MPC · JPL
424404	2008 AK_{25}	—	January 10, 2008	Mount Lemmon	Mount Lemmon Survey	·	690 m	MPC · JPL
424405	2008 AT_{25}	—	January 10, 2008	Mount Lemmon	Mount Lemmon Survey	V	780 m	MPC · JPL
424406	2008 AS_{26}	—	January 10, 2008	Kitt Peak	Spacewatch	·	740 m	MPC · JPL
424407	2008 AP_{27}	—	January 10, 2008	Mount Lemmon	Mount Lemmon Survey	·	1.6 km	MPC · JPL
424408	2008 AG_{34}	—	January 10, 2008	Kitt Peak	Spacewatch	·	1.0 km	MPC · JPL
424409	2008 AR_{38}	—	January 10, 2008	Kitt Peak	Spacewatch	·	670 m	MPC · JPL
424410	2008 AZ_{39}	—	January 10, 2008	Mount Lemmon	Mount Lemmon Survey	·	830 m	MPC · JPL
424411	2008 AW_{42}	—	January 10, 2008	Catalina	CSS	·	1.4 km	MPC · JPL
424412	2008 AN_{57}	—	December 30, 2007	Mount Lemmon	Mount Lemmon Survey	·	910 m	MPC · JPL
424413	2008 AJ_{60}	—	January 11, 2008	Kitt Peak	Spacewatch	·	3.3 km	MPC · JPL
424414	2008 AK_{67}	—	January 11, 2008	Kitt Peak	Spacewatch	(2076)	670 m	MPC · JPL
424415	2008 AN_{77}	—	January 12, 2008	Kitt Peak	Spacewatch	·	850 m	MPC · JPL
424416	2008 AH_{80}	—	January 12, 2008	Kitt Peak	Spacewatch	V	620 m	MPC · JPL
424417	2008 AQ_{84}	—	January 13, 2008	Kitt Peak	Spacewatch	·	590 m	MPC · JPL
424418	2008 AP_{86}	—	January 11, 2008	Las Cruces	Dixon, D. S.	SYL · CYB	5.2 km	MPC · JPL
424419	2008 AS_{90}	—	December 30, 2007	Kitt Peak	Spacewatch	·	1.0 km	MPC · JPL
424420	2008 AL_{92}	—	January 1, 2008	Kitt Peak	Spacewatch	·	730 m	MPC · JPL
424421	2008 AR_{93}	—	January 14, 2008	Kitt Peak	Spacewatch	·	1.0 km	MPC · JPL
424422	2008 AD_{109}	—	December 30, 2007	Kitt Peak	Spacewatch	·	760 m	MPC · JPL
424423	2008 AW_{114}	—	January 10, 2008	Mount Lemmon	Mount Lemmon Survey	·	640 m	MPC · JPL
424424	2008 AA_{128}	—	January 11, 2008	Mount Lemmon	Mount Lemmon Survey	·	830 m	MPC · JPL
424425	2008 BZ_{19}	—	January 30, 2008	Kitt Peak	Spacewatch	·	550 m	MPC · JPL
424426	2008 BS_{33}	—	January 30, 2008	Kitt Peak	Spacewatch	·	1.0 km	MPC · JPL
424427	2008 BW_{33}	—	January 30, 2008	Catalina	CSS	·	760 m	MPC · JPL
424428	2008 BJ_{35}	—	January 30, 2008	Kitt Peak	Spacewatch	·	1.0 km	MPC · JPL
424429	2008 BG_{38}	—	January 31, 2008	Mount Lemmon	Mount Lemmon Survey	·	980 m	MPC · JPL
424430	2008 BF_{46}	—	January 30, 2008	Mount Lemmon	Mount Lemmon Survey	·	880 m	MPC · JPL
424431	2008 BW_{46}	—	January 30, 2008	Kitt Peak	Spacewatch	MAS	670 m	MPC · JPL
424432	2008 BH_{47}	—	January 20, 2008	Mount Lemmon	Mount Lemmon Survey	PHO	880 m	MPC · JPL
424433	2008 CU_{5}	—	February 6, 2008	Socorro	LINEAR	·	1.1 km	MPC · JPL
424434	2008 CB_{7}	—	February 1, 2008	Kitt Peak	Spacewatch	·	940 m	MPC · JPL
424435	2008 CE_{11}	—	February 3, 2008	Kitt Peak	Spacewatch	·	640 m	MPC · JPL
424436	2008 CG_{15}	—	February 3, 2008	Kitt Peak	Spacewatch	·	830 m	MPC · JPL
424437	2008 CP_{15}	—	February 3, 2008	Kitt Peak	Spacewatch	·	850 m	MPC · JPL
424438	2008 CU_{15}	—	February 3, 2008	Kitt Peak	Spacewatch	·	1.1 km	MPC · JPL
424439	2008 CE_{18}	—	January 12, 2008	Kitt Peak	Spacewatch	·	720 m	MPC · JPL
424440	2008 CR_{23}	—	February 1, 2008	Kitt Peak	Spacewatch	·	870 m	MPC · JPL
424441	2008 CL_{24}	—	December 31, 2007	Mount Lemmon	Mount Lemmon Survey	·	720 m	MPC · JPL
424442	2008 CQ_{36}	—	February 2, 2008	Kitt Peak	Spacewatch	·	680 m	MPC · JPL
424443	2008 CE_{39}	—	September 3, 1999	Kitt Peak	Spacewatch	·	1.1 km	MPC · JPL
424444	2008 CL_{40}	—	February 2, 2008	Mount Lemmon	Mount Lemmon Survey	MAS	600 m	MPC · JPL
424445	2008 CA_{43}	—	February 2, 2008	Kitt Peak	Spacewatch	·	1.1 km	MPC · JPL
424446	2008 CK_{44}	—	February 2, 2008	Kitt Peak	Spacewatch	·	900 m	MPC · JPL
424447	2008 CQ_{61}	—	February 7, 2008	Kitt Peak	Spacewatch	·	1.0 km	MPC · JPL
424448	2008 CU_{62}	—	February 8, 2008	Kitt Peak	Spacewatch	·	1.3 km	MPC · JPL
424449	2008 CC_{68}	—	February 8, 2008	Mount Lemmon	Mount Lemmon Survey	·	760 m	MPC · JPL
424450	2008 CE_{77}	—	January 30, 2008	Catalina	CSS	BAP	870 m	MPC · JPL
424451	2008 CH_{77}	—	February 6, 2008	Catalina	CSS	·	830 m	MPC · JPL
424452	2008 CY_{80}	—	February 7, 2008	Kitt Peak	Spacewatch	·	740 m	MPC · JPL
424453	2008 CW_{83}	—	February 7, 2008	Kitt Peak	Spacewatch	NYS	1.0 km	MPC · JPL
424454	2008 CO_{86}	—	February 7, 2008	Mount Lemmon	Mount Lemmon Survey	·	740 m	MPC · JPL
424455	2008 CF_{89}	—	February 7, 2008	Mount Lemmon	Mount Lemmon Survey	·	1.4 km	MPC · JPL
424456	2008 CC_{92}	—	February 8, 2008	Kitt Peak	Spacewatch	·	820 m	MPC · JPL
424457	2008 CQ_{92}	—	February 8, 2008	Kitt Peak	Spacewatch	·	980 m	MPC · JPL
424458	2008 CO_{98}	—	January 30, 2008	Mount Lemmon	Mount Lemmon Survey	MAS	620 m	MPC · JPL
424459	2008 CD_{100}	—	February 9, 2008	Kitt Peak	Spacewatch	·	700 m	MPC · JPL
424460	2008 CC_{121}	—	February 6, 2008	Catalina	CSS	·	630 m	MPC · JPL
424461	2008 CD_{127}	—	February 8, 2008	Kitt Peak	Spacewatch	·	1.2 km	MPC · JPL
424462	2008 CM_{131}	—	December 31, 2007	Mount Lemmon	Mount Lemmon Survey	MAS	630 m	MPC · JPL
424463	2008 CY_{131}	—	February 8, 2008	Kitt Peak	Spacewatch	·	870 m	MPC · JPL
424464	2008 CF_{138}	—	February 8, 2008	Kitt Peak	Spacewatch	·	1.0 km	MPC · JPL
424465	2008 CV_{138}	—	February 8, 2008	Kitt Peak	Spacewatch	·	1.4 km	MPC · JPL
424466	2008 CW_{139}	—	February 8, 2008	Catalina	CSS	·	730 m	MPC · JPL
424467	2008 CP_{150}	—	January 10, 2008	Mount Lemmon	Mount Lemmon Survey	·	670 m	MPC · JPL
424468	2008 CX_{153}	—	February 9, 2008	Kitt Peak	Spacewatch	·	1.3 km	MPC · JPL
424469	2008 CS_{158}	—	February 9, 2008	Kitt Peak	Spacewatch	·	810 m	MPC · JPL
424470	2008 CD_{168}	—	February 11, 2008	Mount Lemmon	Mount Lemmon Survey	·	1.1 km	MPC · JPL
424471	2008 CJ_{172}	—	December 18, 2007	Mount Lemmon	Mount Lemmon Survey	·	880 m	MPC · JPL
424472	2008 CP_{177}	—	November 19, 2007	Mount Lemmon	Mount Lemmon Survey	·	710 m	MPC · JPL
424473	2008 CV_{191}	—	February 2, 2008	Kitt Peak	Spacewatch	·	940 m	MPC · JPL
424474	2008 CF_{193}	—	February 9, 2008	Kitt Peak	Spacewatch	·	1.7 km	MPC · JPL
424475	2008 CN_{198}	—	February 12, 2008	Kitt Peak	Spacewatch	·	680 m	MPC · JPL
424476	2008 CO_{198}	—	February 12, 2008	Kitt Peak	Spacewatch	·	860 m	MPC · JPL
424477	2008 CV_{205}	—	February 2, 2008	Kitt Peak	Spacewatch	·	720 m	MPC · JPL
424478	2008 CP_{207}	—	February 2, 2008	Kitt Peak	Spacewatch	NYS	810 m	MPC · JPL
424479	2008 CV_{210}	—	February 2, 2008	Kitt Peak	Spacewatch	NYS	870 m	MPC · JPL
424480	2008 CW_{213}	—	February 10, 2008	Mount Lemmon	Mount Lemmon Survey	·	1.5 km	MPC · JPL
424481	2008 DV_{3}	—	February 24, 2008	Mount Lemmon	Mount Lemmon Survey	·	900 m	MPC · JPL
424482	2008 DG_{5}	—	February 28, 2008	Catalina	CSS	APO · PHA	430 m	MPC · JPL
424483	2008 DM_{6}	—	February 24, 2008	Mount Lemmon	Mount Lemmon Survey	·	1.3 km	MPC · JPL
424484	2008 DH_{14}	—	February 26, 2008	Mount Lemmon	Mount Lemmon Survey	3:2	5.2 km	MPC · JPL
424485	2008 DS_{15}	—	December 31, 2007	Mount Lemmon	Mount Lemmon Survey	·	840 m	MPC · JPL
424486	2008 DT_{16}	—	February 27, 2008	Kitt Peak	Spacewatch	NYS	1.1 km	MPC · JPL
424487	2008 DN_{19}	—	February 27, 2008	Kitt Peak	Spacewatch	·	1.6 km	MPC · JPL
424488	2008 DP_{24}	—	February 28, 2008	Mount Lemmon	Mount Lemmon Survey	·	720 m	MPC · JPL
424489	2008 DH_{28}	—	February 24, 2008	Altschwendt	W. Ries	·	910 m	MPC · JPL
424490	2008 DR_{32}	—	February 27, 2008	Kitt Peak	Spacewatch	MAS	690 m	MPC · JPL
424491	2008 DJ_{37}	—	February 27, 2008	Mount Lemmon	Mount Lemmon Survey	·	1.2 km	MPC · JPL
424492	2008 DC_{38}	—	February 27, 2008	Kitt Peak	Spacewatch	NYS	870 m	MPC · JPL
424493	2008 DV_{42}	—	February 28, 2008	Kitt Peak	Spacewatch	·	800 m	MPC · JPL
424494	2008 DN_{43}	—	February 28, 2008	Mount Lemmon	Mount Lemmon Survey	(2076)	800 m	MPC · JPL
424495	2008 DK_{44}	—	February 28, 2008	Kitt Peak	Spacewatch	ERI	1.9 km	MPC · JPL
424496	2008 DO_{45}	—	February 28, 2008	Mount Lemmon	Mount Lemmon Survey	·	1.3 km	MPC · JPL
424497	2008 DR_{47}	—	February 28, 2008	Mount Lemmon	Mount Lemmon Survey	·	850 m	MPC · JPL
424498	2008 DN_{49}	—	February 29, 2008	Mount Lemmon	Mount Lemmon Survey	·	970 m	MPC · JPL
424499	2008 DA_{52}	—	February 29, 2008	Kitt Peak	Spacewatch	·	870 m	MPC · JPL
424500	2008 DG_{53}	—	February 29, 2008	Mount Lemmon	Mount Lemmon Survey	·	1.2 km	MPC · JPL

== 424501–424600 ==
back to top

Designation			Discovery			Properties		Ref
Permanent	Provisional	Named after	Date	Site	Discoverer(s)	Category	Diam.	Ref
424501	2008 DS_{64}	—	February 28, 2008	Mount Lemmon	Mount Lemmon Survey	3:2	6.1 km	MPC · JPL
424502	2008 DD_{68}	—	February 29, 2008	Kitt Peak	Spacewatch	·	1.1 km	MPC · JPL
424503	2008 DX_{69}	—	February 24, 2008	Kitt Peak	Spacewatch	MAS	570 m	MPC · JPL
424504	2008 DX_{75}	—	February 8, 2008	Kitt Peak	Spacewatch	3:2	5.1 km	MPC · JPL
424505	2008 DK_{78}	—	February 28, 2008	Mount Lemmon	Mount Lemmon Survey	·	840 m	MPC · JPL
424506	2008 DQ_{80}	—	February 18, 2008	Mount Lemmon	Mount Lemmon Survey	3:2	4.8 km	MPC · JPL
424507	2008 DZ_{80}	—	February 26, 2008	Mount Lemmon	Mount Lemmon Survey	MAS · fast?	640 m	MPC · JPL
424508	2008 DC_{82}	—	February 28, 2008	Kitt Peak	Spacewatch	·	1.0 km	MPC · JPL
424509	2008 EY	—	February 13, 2008	Mount Lemmon	Mount Lemmon Survey	·	1.4 km	MPC · JPL
424510	2008 ED_{11}	—	March 1, 2008	Kitt Peak	Spacewatch	·	1.2 km	MPC · JPL
424511	2008 EU_{13}	—	September 19, 2006	Kitt Peak	Spacewatch	·	930 m	MPC · JPL
424512	2008 EH_{22}	—	March 2, 2008	Purple Mountain	PMO NEO Survey Program	·	840 m	MPC · JPL
424513	2008 ES_{23}	—	December 14, 2003	Kitt Peak	Spacewatch	·	970 m	MPC · JPL
424514	2008 EV_{26}	—	March 4, 2008	Catalina	CSS	ERI	2.2 km	MPC · JPL
424515	2008 EV_{32}	—	March 1, 2008	Kitt Peak	Spacewatch	·	1.5 km	MPC · JPL
424516	2008 EZ_{39}	—	March 4, 2008	Kitt Peak	Spacewatch	·	780 m	MPC · JPL
424517	2008 EJ_{44}	—	March 5, 2008	Kitt Peak	Spacewatch	·	920 m	MPC · JPL
424518	2008 EC_{45}	—	March 5, 2008	Kitt Peak	Spacewatch	MAS	620 m	MPC · JPL
424519	2008 EA_{48}	—	March 5, 2008	Kitt Peak	Spacewatch	·	1.1 km	MPC · JPL
424520	2008 EX_{52}	—	March 6, 2008	Mount Lemmon	Mount Lemmon Survey	·	1.3 km	MPC · JPL
424521	2008 EZ_{53}	—	March 6, 2008	Mount Lemmon	Mount Lemmon Survey	·	1.1 km	MPC · JPL
424522	2008 EB_{69}	—	March 11, 2008	Kitt Peak	Spacewatch	·	4.5 km	MPC · JPL
424523	2008 EW_{70}	—	August 19, 2006	Kitt Peak	Spacewatch	PHO	770 m	MPC · JPL
424524	2008 EJ_{71}	—	March 6, 2008	Mount Lemmon	Mount Lemmon Survey	·	950 m	MPC · JPL
424525	2008 EN_{72}	—	March 6, 2008	Mount Lemmon	Mount Lemmon Survey	·	840 m	MPC · JPL
424526	2008 EP_{76}	—	March 7, 2008	Kitt Peak	Spacewatch	·	910 m	MPC · JPL
424527	2008 EX_{86}	—	January 30, 2008	Mount Lemmon	Mount Lemmon Survey	·	1.1 km	MPC · JPL
424528	2008 EB_{92}	—	February 8, 2008	Kitt Peak	Spacewatch	·	980 m	MPC · JPL
424529	2008 EE_{92}	—	March 3, 2008	Catalina	CSS	·	940 m	MPC · JPL
424530	2008 EK_{94}	—	February 13, 2008	Mount Lemmon	Mount Lemmon Survey	ERI	1.3 km	MPC · JPL
424531	2008 EB_{95}	—	March 5, 2008	Mount Lemmon	Mount Lemmon Survey	·	940 m	MPC · JPL
424532	2008 EZ_{97}	—	March 15, 2008	Mount Lemmon	Mount Lemmon Survey	AMO +1km	910 m	MPC · JPL
424533	2008 EC_{100}	—	March 6, 2008	Catalina	CSS	·	990 m	MPC · JPL
424534	2008 EH_{100}	—	February 2, 2008	Kitt Peak	Spacewatch	·	1.2 km	MPC · JPL
424535	2008 ET_{111}	—	March 8, 2008	Kitt Peak	Spacewatch	NYS	1.0 km	MPC · JPL
424536	2008 EH_{117}	—	March 8, 2008	Kitt Peak	Spacewatch	NYS	1.0 km	MPC · JPL
424537	2008 EF_{128}	—	February 29, 2008	Kitt Peak	Spacewatch	NYS	980 m	MPC · JPL
424538	2008 EA_{130}	—	March 11, 2008	Kitt Peak	Spacewatch	·	810 m	MPC · JPL
424539	2008 EO_{135}	—	November 23, 2006	Mount Lemmon	Mount Lemmon Survey	·	1.2 km	MPC · JPL
424540	2008 ET_{135}	—	February 11, 2008	Mount Lemmon	Mount Lemmon Survey	·	960 m	MPC · JPL
424541	2008 EY_{138}	—	March 11, 2008	Kitt Peak	Spacewatch	·	1.2 km	MPC · JPL
424542	2008 EB_{140}	—	March 12, 2008	Kitt Peak	Spacewatch	·	950 m	MPC · JPL
424543	2008 EQ_{141}	—	February 9, 2008	Kitt Peak	Spacewatch	·	790 m	MPC · JPL
424544	2008 EH_{148}	—	March 2, 2008	Kitt Peak	Spacewatch	NYS	840 m	MPC · JPL
424545	2008 EN_{148}	—	March 2, 2008	Kitt Peak	Spacewatch	·	940 m	MPC · JPL
424546	2008 EP_{150}	—	October 1, 2006	Kitt Peak	Spacewatch	·	1 km	MPC · JPL
424547	2008 EB_{152}	—	March 10, 2008	Kitt Peak	Spacewatch	·	970 m	MPC · JPL
424548	2008 EP_{153}	—	March 13, 2008	Kitt Peak	Spacewatch	·	1.0 km	MPC · JPL
424549	2008 EX_{160}	—	March 2, 2008	Kitt Peak	Spacewatch	MAS	780 m	MPC · JPL
424550	2008 ER_{161}	—	March 9, 2008	Kitt Peak	Spacewatch	3:2	5.3 km	MPC · JPL
424551	2008 EY_{163}	—	March 13, 2008	Kitt Peak	Spacewatch	·	1.2 km	MPC · JPL
424552	2008 EW_{167}	—	March 10, 2008	Kitt Peak	Spacewatch	V	680 m	MPC · JPL
424553	2008 FQ	—	March 25, 2008	Kitt Peak	Spacewatch	MAS	630 m	MPC · JPL
424554	2008 FC_{16}	—	March 27, 2008	Kitt Peak	Spacewatch	·	950 m	MPC · JPL
424555	2008 FP_{20}	—	March 27, 2008	Kitt Peak	Spacewatch	·	1.5 km	MPC · JPL
424556	2008 FZ_{25}	—	March 27, 2008	Kitt Peak	Spacewatch	·	1.5 km	MPC · JPL
424557	2008 FK_{36}	—	March 28, 2008	Mount Lemmon	Mount Lemmon Survey	·	700 m	MPC · JPL
424558	2008 FV_{38}	—	March 10, 2008	Kitt Peak	Spacewatch	NYS	1.2 km	MPC · JPL
424559	2008 FT_{46}	—	December 17, 2003	Kitt Peak	Spacewatch	·	840 m	MPC · JPL
424560	2008 FS_{52}	—	March 28, 2008	Mount Lemmon	Mount Lemmon Survey	·	810 m	MPC · JPL
424561	2008 FE_{57}	—	March 28, 2008	Mount Lemmon	Mount Lemmon Survey	NYS	1.0 km	MPC · JPL
424562	2008 FA_{62}	—	February 14, 2004	Kitt Peak	Spacewatch	·	1.1 km	MPC · JPL
424563	2008 FM_{62}	—	March 27, 2008	Kitt Peak	Spacewatch	·	1.4 km	MPC · JPL
424564	2008 FJ_{67}	—	March 28, 2008	Mount Lemmon	Mount Lemmon Survey	MAS	700 m	MPC · JPL
424565	2008 FH_{69}	—	March 28, 2008	Mount Lemmon	Mount Lemmon Survey	NYS	1.2 km	MPC · JPL
424566	2008 FH_{86}	—	February 13, 2008	Mount Lemmon	Mount Lemmon Survey	NYS	820 m	MPC · JPL
424567	2008 FF_{95}	—	March 29, 2008	Kitt Peak	Spacewatch	·	1.2 km	MPC · JPL
424568	2008 FV_{96}	—	March 29, 2008	Catalina	CSS	·	1.1 km	MPC · JPL
424569	2008 FP_{104}	—	March 30, 2008	Kitt Peak	Spacewatch	NYS	890 m	MPC · JPL
424570	2008 FB_{115}	—	January 30, 2008	Mount Lemmon	Mount Lemmon Survey	3:2	5.2 km	MPC · JPL
424571	2008 FN_{130}	—	March 30, 2008	Catalina	CSS	PHO	960 m	MPC · JPL
424572	2008 FO_{133}	—	February 28, 2008	Kitt Peak	Spacewatch	·	1.4 km	MPC · JPL
424573	2008 GS	—	April 2, 2008	Socorro	LINEAR	·	1.0 km	MPC · JPL
424574	2008 GM_{3}	—	April 5, 2008	Catalina	CSS	·	1.3 km	MPC · JPL
424575	2008 GV_{18}	—	March 28, 2008	Kitt Peak	Spacewatch	·	720 m	MPC · JPL
424576	2008 GY_{22}	—	March 4, 2008	Mount Lemmon	Mount Lemmon Survey	NYS	1.1 km	MPC · JPL
424577	2008 GD_{28}	—	March 10, 2008	Kitt Peak	Spacewatch	·	880 m	MPC · JPL
424578	2008 GW_{29}	—	October 13, 2006	Kitt Peak	Spacewatch	·	990 m	MPC · JPL
424579	2008 GC_{34}	—	March 15, 2008	Mount Lemmon	Mount Lemmon Survey	·	1.2 km	MPC · JPL
424580	2008 GJ_{37}	—	April 3, 2008	Kitt Peak	Spacewatch	·	1.0 km	MPC · JPL
424581	2008 GO_{37}	—	April 3, 2008	Kitt Peak	Spacewatch	NYS	960 m	MPC · JPL
424582	2008 GZ_{46}	—	April 4, 2008	Kitt Peak	Spacewatch	·	1.2 km	MPC · JPL
424583	2008 GK_{54}	—	April 5, 2008	Kitt Peak	Spacewatch	·	1.2 km	MPC · JPL
424584	2008 GY_{57}	—	April 5, 2008	Mount Lemmon	Mount Lemmon Survey	NYS	1.1 km	MPC · JPL
424585	2008 GF_{58}	—	April 5, 2008	Mount Lemmon	Mount Lemmon Survey	V	710 m	MPC · JPL
424586	2008 GB_{65}	—	April 6, 2008	Kitt Peak	Spacewatch	·	1.2 km	MPC · JPL
424587	2008 GP_{66}	—	April 6, 2008	Kitt Peak	Spacewatch	·	1.1 km	MPC · JPL
424588	2008 GT_{68}	—	April 6, 2008	Kitt Peak	Spacewatch	·	1.3 km	MPC · JPL
424589	2008 GV_{71}	—	April 7, 2008	Kitt Peak	Spacewatch	NYS	1.2 km	MPC · JPL
424590	2008 GO_{85}	—	March 31, 2008	Kitt Peak	Spacewatch	·	1.3 km	MPC · JPL
424591	2008 GD_{99}	—	March 13, 2008	Kitt Peak	Spacewatch	·	1.2 km	MPC · JPL
424592	2008 GM_{100}	—	April 1, 2008	Kitt Peak	Spacewatch	EUN	1.0 km	MPC · JPL
424593	2008 GF_{101}	—	April 9, 2008	Kitt Peak	Spacewatch	V	700 m	MPC · JPL
424594	2008 GL_{106}	—	April 11, 2008	Mount Lemmon	Mount Lemmon Survey	·	1.2 km	MPC · JPL
424595	2008 GM_{118}	—	April 11, 2008	Mount Lemmon	Mount Lemmon Survey	NYS	1.2 km	MPC · JPL
424596	2008 GM_{123}	—	April 13, 2008	Kitt Peak	Spacewatch	·	1.0 km	MPC · JPL
424597	2008 GO_{136}	—	April 3, 2008	Kitt Peak	Spacewatch	·	1.5 km	MPC · JPL
424598	2008 GS_{144}	—	February 12, 2008	Mount Lemmon	Mount Lemmon Survey	·	1.3 km	MPC · JPL
424599	2008 GR_{145}	—	April 8, 2008	Kitt Peak	Spacewatch	·	940 m	MPC · JPL
424600	2008 HT_{12}	—	April 24, 2008	Kitt Peak	Spacewatch	·	1.3 km	MPC · JPL

== 424601–424700 ==
back to top

Designation			Discovery			Properties		Ref
Permanent	Provisional	Named after	Date	Site	Discoverer(s)	Category	Diam.	Ref
424601	2008 HY_{13}	—	April 25, 2008	Kitt Peak	Spacewatch	NYS	1.1 km	MPC · JPL
424602	2008 HU_{20}	—	April 26, 2008	Mount Lemmon	Mount Lemmon Survey	·	960 m	MPC · JPL
424603	2008 HS_{27}	—	April 28, 2008	Kitt Peak	Spacewatch	·	980 m	MPC · JPL
424604	2008 HV_{39}	—	April 3, 2008	Mount Lemmon	Mount Lemmon Survey	NYS	1.1 km	MPC · JPL
424605	2008 HH_{41}	—	April 26, 2008	Catalina	CSS	PHO	1.3 km	MPC · JPL
424606	2008 HZ_{45}	—	April 15, 2008	Kitt Peak	Spacewatch	L5	8.9 km	MPC · JPL
424607	2008 HE_{51}	—	April 29, 2008	Kitt Peak	Spacewatch	·	1.1 km	MPC · JPL
424608	2008 HR_{55}	—	April 29, 2008	Kitt Peak	Spacewatch	NYS	1.2 km	MPC · JPL
424609	2008 HC_{68}	—	April 25, 2008	Kitt Peak	Spacewatch	EUN	1.3 km	MPC · JPL
424610	2008 HZ_{69}	—	April 27, 2008	Mount Lemmon	Mount Lemmon Survey	·	1.5 km	MPC · JPL
424611	2008 JD	—	March 7, 2008	Mount Lemmon	Mount Lemmon Survey	·	2.0 km	MPC · JPL
424612	2008 JN_{4}	—	May 1, 2008	Kitt Peak	Spacewatch	·	1.7 km	MPC · JPL
424613 Kraszewski	2008 JC_{6}	Kraszewski	May 2, 2008	Moletai	Molėtai	·	2.4 km	MPC · JPL
424614	2008 JS_{6}	—	May 2, 2008	Kitt Peak	Spacewatch	NYS	1.0 km	MPC · JPL
424615	2008 JP_{12}	—	May 3, 2008	Kitt Peak	Spacewatch	·	1.3 km	MPC · JPL
424616	2008 JH_{13}	—	April 14, 2008	Mount Lemmon	Mount Lemmon Survey	·	1.8 km	MPC · JPL
424617	2008 JO_{15}	—	May 2, 2008	Kitt Peak	Spacewatch	·	1.3 km	MPC · JPL
424618	2008 JZ_{24}	—	May 11, 2008	Farra d'Isonzo	Farra d'Isonzo	L5	14 km	MPC · JPL
424619	2008 JT_{25}	—	May 8, 2008	Kitt Peak	Spacewatch	L5	9.0 km	MPC · JPL
424620	2008 JO_{26}	—	May 3, 2008	Catalina	CSS	H	710 m	MPC · JPL
424621	2008 JY_{32}	—	May 8, 2008	Kitt Peak	Spacewatch	L5	7.9 km	MPC · JPL
424622	2008 JZ_{36}	—	May 5, 2008	Mount Lemmon	Mount Lemmon Survey	MAS	630 m	MPC · JPL
424623	2008 JA_{37}	—	May 5, 2008	Mount Lemmon	Mount Lemmon Survey	·	1.8 km	MPC · JPL
424624	2008 JL_{37}	—	May 3, 2008	Mount Lemmon	Mount Lemmon Survey	·	1.4 km	MPC · JPL
424625	2008 JF_{38}	—	May 6, 2008	Mount Lemmon	Mount Lemmon Survey	·	1.1 km	MPC · JPL
424626	2008 JH_{39}	—	May 15, 2008	Mount Lemmon	Mount Lemmon Survey	MAR	970 m	MPC · JPL
424627	2008 JH_{40}	—	May 3, 2008	Mount Lemmon	Mount Lemmon Survey	·	1.4 km	MPC · JPL
424628	2008 KD_{5}	—	May 27, 2008	Kitt Peak	Spacewatch	EUN	1.2 km	MPC · JPL
424629	2008 KV_{5}	—	May 28, 2008	Kitt Peak	Spacewatch	V	610 m	MPC · JPL
424630	2008 KN_{12}	—	December 21, 2006	Kitt Peak	Spacewatch	NYS	1.2 km	MPC · JPL
424631	2008 KJ_{14}	—	April 28, 2008	Mount Lemmon	Mount Lemmon Survey	H	510 m	MPC · JPL
424632	2008 KE_{18}	—	May 28, 2008	Kitt Peak	Spacewatch	L5	12 km	MPC · JPL
424633	2008 KK_{27}	—	May 30, 2008	Kitt Peak	Spacewatch	·	1.3 km	MPC · JPL
424634	2008 KW_{40}	—	April 27, 2008	Kitt Peak	Spacewatch	·	900 m	MPC · JPL
424635	2008 KN_{41}	—	May 31, 2008	Kitt Peak	Spacewatch	·	970 m	MPC · JPL
424636	2008 LA_{3}	—	June 1, 2008	Kitt Peak	Spacewatch	·	1.1 km	MPC · JPL
424637	2008 LV_{5}	—	March 6, 2008	Mount Lemmon	Mount Lemmon Survey	·	1.2 km	MPC · JPL
424638	2008 LM_{8}	—	June 6, 2008	Kitt Peak	Spacewatch	JUN	1.2 km	MPC · JPL
424639	2008 LW_{9}	—	June 6, 2008	Kitt Peak	Spacewatch	·	1.8 km	MPC · JPL
424640	2008 LO_{11}	—	June 7, 2008	Kitt Peak	Spacewatch	EUN	1.1 km	MPC · JPL
424641	2008 LZ_{12}	—	May 29, 2008	Kitt Peak	Spacewatch	·	1.2 km	MPC · JPL
424642	2008 OA	—	July 16, 2008	Charleston	Astronomical Research Observatory	·	1.5 km	MPC · JPL
424643	2008 OD_{2}	—	June 2, 2008	Mount Lemmon	Mount Lemmon Survey	·	2.1 km	MPC · JPL
424644	2008 OC_{7}	—	July 29, 2008	Mount Lemmon	Mount Lemmon Survey	·	2.8 km	MPC · JPL
424645	2008 OV_{9}	—	July 31, 2008	La Sagra	OAM	·	2.1 km	MPC · JPL
424646	2008 OD_{21}	—	July 29, 2008	Kitt Peak	Spacewatch	EUN	1.4 km	MPC · JPL
424647	2008 PY_{6}	—	August 5, 2008	La Sagra	OAM	H	740 m	MPC · JPL
424648	2008 PH_{18}	—	August 7, 2008	Andrushivka	Andrushivka	·	2.0 km	MPC · JPL
424649	2008 PG_{20}	—	July 11, 2008	Siding Spring	SSS	·	2.4 km	MPC · JPL
424650	2008 QN_{11}	—	August 21, 2008	Kitt Peak	Spacewatch	·	2.4 km	MPC · JPL
424651	2008 QX_{12}	—	August 26, 2008	La Sagra	OAM	·	1.8 km	MPC · JPL
424652	2008 QS_{20}	—	August 26, 2008	Socorro	LINEAR	·	2.4 km	MPC · JPL
424653	2008 QK_{21}	—	August 26, 2008	Socorro	LINEAR	·	2.5 km	MPC · JPL
424654	2008 QJ_{23}	—	August 26, 2008	Socorro	LINEAR	EUN	1.5 km	MPC · JPL
424655	2008 QB_{33}	—	August 31, 2008	Bergisch Gladbach	W. Bickel	·	2.6 km	MPC · JPL
424656	2008 QM_{36}	—	August 20, 2008	Kitt Peak	Spacewatch	·	1.5 km	MPC · JPL
424657	2008 QU_{39}	—	August 24, 2008	Kitt Peak	Spacewatch	·	2.0 km	MPC · JPL
424658	2008 QF_{41}	—	August 21, 2008	Kitt Peak	Spacewatch	·	1.9 km	MPC · JPL
424659	2008 QU_{41}	—	August 24, 2008	Kitt Peak	Spacewatch	·	1.8 km	MPC · JPL
424660	2008 QA_{47}	—	February 21, 2006	Catalina	CSS	·	2.3 km	MPC · JPL
424661	2008 RS_{17}	—	September 4, 2008	Kitt Peak	Spacewatch	·	1.7 km	MPC · JPL
424662	2008 RL_{25}	—	September 5, 2008	Junk Bond	D. Healy	·	1.7 km	MPC · JPL
424663	2008 RS_{40}	—	September 2, 2008	Kitt Peak	Spacewatch	EOS	1.4 km	MPC · JPL
424664	2008 RA_{43}	—	September 2, 2008	Kitt Peak	Spacewatch	·	1.7 km	MPC · JPL
424665	2008 RC_{44}	—	September 2, 2008	Kitt Peak	Spacewatch	·	1.1 km	MPC · JPL
424666	2008 RH_{44}	—	September 2, 2008	Kitt Peak	Spacewatch	KOR	1.4 km	MPC · JPL
424667	2008 RM_{44}	—	April 26, 2007	Mount Lemmon	Mount Lemmon Survey	·	1.8 km	MPC · JPL
424668	2008 RN_{49}	—	September 3, 2008	Kitt Peak	Spacewatch	·	2.0 km	MPC · JPL
424669	2008 RZ_{57}	—	September 3, 2008	Kitt Peak	Spacewatch	MRX	1.0 km	MPC · JPL
424670	2008 RN_{62}	—	September 4, 2008	Kitt Peak	Spacewatch	·	2.0 km	MPC · JPL
424671	2008 RB_{71}	—	September 6, 2008	Mount Lemmon	Mount Lemmon Survey	·	2.1 km	MPC · JPL
424672	2008 RT_{80}	—	September 3, 2008	Kitt Peak	Spacewatch	·	2.7 km	MPC · JPL
424673	2008 RH_{81}	—	September 4, 2008	Kitt Peak	Spacewatch	·	540 m	MPC · JPL
424674	2008 RT_{82}	—	September 4, 2008	Kitt Peak	Spacewatch	·	1.5 km	MPC · JPL
424675	2008 RB_{94}	—	September 6, 2008	Kitt Peak	Spacewatch	HOF	2.8 km	MPC · JPL
424676	2008 RD_{96}	—	July 29, 2008	Kitt Peak	Spacewatch	·	1.7 km	MPC · JPL
424677	2008 RO_{99}	—	September 2, 2008	Kitt Peak	Spacewatch	KOR	1.1 km	MPC · JPL
424678	2008 RX_{102}	—	September 4, 2008	Kitt Peak	Spacewatch	·	2.3 km	MPC · JPL
424679	2008 RA_{104}	—	September 5, 2008	Kitt Peak	Spacewatch	·	1.7 km	MPC · JPL
424680	2008 RJ_{104}	—	September 5, 2008	Kitt Peak	Spacewatch	·	2.0 km	MPC · JPL
424681	2008 RL_{108}	—	September 9, 2008	Mount Lemmon	Mount Lemmon Survey	·	2.8 km	MPC · JPL
424682	2008 RO_{108}	—	September 10, 2008	Kitt Peak	Spacewatch	KOR	1.0 km	MPC · JPL
424683	2008 RP_{111}	—	September 4, 2008	Kitt Peak	Spacewatch	·	1.9 km	MPC · JPL
424684	2008 RX_{111}	—	September 4, 2008	Kitt Peak	Spacewatch	·	2.5 km	MPC · JPL
424685	2008 RQ_{113}	—	September 6, 2008	Kitt Peak	Spacewatch	KOR	1.3 km	MPC · JPL
424686	2008 RP_{114}	—	September 6, 2008	Mount Lemmon	Mount Lemmon Survey	·	2.2 km	MPC · JPL
424687	2008 RZ_{117}	—	September 9, 2008	Mount Lemmon	Mount Lemmon Survey	·	1.5 km	MPC · JPL
424688	2008 RE_{123}	—	September 6, 2008	Kitt Peak	Spacewatch	KOR	1.2 km	MPC · JPL
424689	2008 RW_{130}	—	September 4, 2008	Kitt Peak	Spacewatch	·	2.0 km	MPC · JPL
424690	2008 RD_{136}	—	September 5, 2008	Kitt Peak	Spacewatch	·	2.2 km	MPC · JPL
424691	2008 RR_{140}	—	September 9, 2008	Mount Lemmon	Mount Lemmon Survey	·	2.5 km	MPC · JPL
424692	2008 RW_{144}	—	September 4, 2008	Kitt Peak	Spacewatch	KOR	1.4 km	MPC · JPL
424693	2008 SN_{9}	—	September 7, 2008	Mount Lemmon	Mount Lemmon Survey	DOR	2.7 km	MPC · JPL
424694	2008 SU_{9}	—	September 6, 2008	Mount Lemmon	Mount Lemmon Survey	(18466)	2.1 km	MPC · JPL
424695	2008 SU_{19}	—	August 7, 2008	Kitt Peak	Spacewatch	·	1.8 km	MPC · JPL
424696	2008 SM_{26}	—	September 19, 2008	Kitt Peak	Spacewatch	·	2.2 km	MPC · JPL
424697	2008 SS_{36}	—	July 30, 2008	Kitt Peak	Spacewatch	·	2.0 km	MPC · JPL
424698	2008 SL_{37}	—	September 20, 2008	Kitt Peak	Spacewatch	·	1.7 km	MPC · JPL
424699	2008 ST_{37}	—	September 6, 2008	Mount Lemmon	Mount Lemmon Survey	·	1.2 km	MPC · JPL
424700	2008 SP_{38}	—	September 20, 2008	Kitt Peak	Spacewatch	T_{j} (2.98)	3.1 km	MPC · JPL

== 424701–424800 ==
back to top

Designation			Discovery			Properties		Ref
Permanent	Provisional	Named after	Date	Site	Discoverer(s)	Category	Diam.	Ref
424701	2008 SY_{43}	—	September 20, 2008	Kitt Peak	Spacewatch	·	1.1 km	MPC · JPL
424702	2008 SH_{45}	—	September 20, 2008	Kitt Peak	Spacewatch	·	1.9 km	MPC · JPL
424703	2008 SC_{50}	—	September 20, 2008	Mount Lemmon	Mount Lemmon Survey	·	1.2 km	MPC · JPL
424704	2008 ST_{50}	—	September 20, 2008	Mount Lemmon	Mount Lemmon Survey	EOS	1.3 km	MPC · JPL
424705	2008 SE_{66}	—	September 21, 2008	Mount Lemmon	Mount Lemmon Survey	·	2.1 km	MPC · JPL
424706	2008 SR_{68}	—	September 21, 2008	Kitt Peak	Spacewatch	·	2.4 km	MPC · JPL
424707	2008 SM_{86}	—	September 20, 2008	Kitt Peak	Spacewatch	·	2.6 km	MPC · JPL
424708	2008 SV_{92}	—	September 21, 2008	Kitt Peak	Spacewatch	·	2.3 km	MPC · JPL
424709	2008 SH_{100}	—	September 21, 2008	Kitt Peak	Spacewatch	·	2.6 km	MPC · JPL
424710	2008 SR_{103}	—	September 21, 2008	Kitt Peak	Spacewatch	VER	2.2 km	MPC · JPL
424711	2008 SX_{108}	—	August 21, 2008	Kitt Peak	Spacewatch	ADE	1.8 km	MPC · JPL
424712	2008 SQ_{119}	—	September 22, 2008	Mount Lemmon	Mount Lemmon Survey	(12739)	1.6 km	MPC · JPL
424713	2008 SJ_{124}	—	September 22, 2008	Mount Lemmon	Mount Lemmon Survey	·	1.5 km	MPC · JPL
424714	2008 SO_{125}	—	September 22, 2008	Mount Lemmon	Mount Lemmon Survey	·	2.3 km	MPC · JPL
424715	2008 SV_{130}	—	September 22, 2008	Kitt Peak	Spacewatch	·	1.5 km	MPC · JPL
424716	2008 SP_{140}	—	September 24, 2008	Mount Lemmon	Mount Lemmon Survey	·	2.4 km	MPC · JPL
424717	2008 SH_{149}	—	September 23, 2008	Kitt Peak	Spacewatch	·	1.2 km	MPC · JPL
424718	2008 SQ_{157}	—	September 30, 2003	Kitt Peak	Spacewatch	EOS	2.0 km	MPC · JPL
424719	2008 SR_{161}	—	September 28, 2008	Socorro	LINEAR	EMA	2.7 km	MPC · JPL
424720	2008 SY_{180}	—	September 24, 2008	Kitt Peak	Spacewatch	·	1.7 km	MPC · JPL
424721	2008 SB_{184}	—	September 20, 2008	Kitt Peak	Spacewatch	·	1.8 km	MPC · JPL
424722	2008 SS_{193}	—	September 25, 2008	Kitt Peak	Spacewatch	·	2.2 km	MPC · JPL
424723	2008 SP_{195}	—	September 25, 2008	Kitt Peak	Spacewatch	·	3.4 km	MPC · JPL
424724	2008 SW_{196}	—	September 25, 2008	Kitt Peak	Spacewatch	WIT	1.0 km	MPC · JPL
424725	2008 SM_{206}	—	September 26, 2008	Kitt Peak	Spacewatch	·	2.5 km	MPC · JPL
424726	2008 SP_{208}	—	September 27, 2008	Mount Lemmon	Mount Lemmon Survey	EOS	1.7 km	MPC · JPL
424727	2008 SZ_{226}	—	October 12, 2004	Kitt Peak	Spacewatch	·	2.1 km	MPC · JPL
424728	2008 SL_{227}	—	September 5, 2008	Kitt Peak	Spacewatch	·	2.4 km	MPC · JPL
424729	2008 SX_{227}	—	September 28, 2008	Mount Lemmon	Mount Lemmon Survey	·	1.7 km	MPC · JPL
424730	2008 SJ_{241}	—	August 22, 2008	Kitt Peak	Spacewatch	·	1.7 km	MPC · JPL
424731	2008 SK_{243}	—	September 29, 2008	Kitt Peak	Spacewatch	·	1.8 km	MPC · JPL
424732	2008 SW_{243}	—	September 24, 2008	Kitt Peak	Spacewatch	·	1.7 km	MPC · JPL
424733	2008 SE_{244}	—	September 24, 2008	Kitt Peak	Spacewatch	H	610 m	MPC · JPL
424734	2008 SO_{246}	—	September 5, 2008	Kitt Peak	Spacewatch	VER	2.5 km	MPC · JPL
424735	2008 SZ_{250}	—	September 24, 2008	Kitt Peak	Spacewatch	KOR	1.0 km	MPC · JPL
424736	2008 SE_{251}	—	September 24, 2008	Kitt Peak	Spacewatch	KOR	1.3 km	MPC · JPL
424737	2008 SH_{254}	—	September 22, 2008	Mount Lemmon	Mount Lemmon Survey	·	2.2 km	MPC · JPL
424738	2008 ST_{270}	—	September 25, 2008	Kitt Peak	Spacewatch	·	3.5 km	MPC · JPL
424739	2008 SR_{271}	—	September 30, 2008	Mount Lemmon	Mount Lemmon Survey	EOS	1.8 km	MPC · JPL
424740	2008 SH_{281}	—	September 22, 2008	Mount Lemmon	Mount Lemmon Survey	·	1.8 km	MPC · JPL
424741	2008 SP_{281}	—	September 22, 2008	Mount Lemmon	Mount Lemmon Survey	·	2.0 km	MPC · JPL
424742	2008 SO_{286}	—	September 22, 2008	Catalina	CSS	·	2.0 km	MPC · JPL
424743	2008 SC_{299}	—	September 22, 2008	Socorro	LINEAR	·	3.2 km	MPC · JPL
424744	2008 SR_{300}	—	September 23, 2008	Catalina	CSS	·	2.2 km	MPC · JPL
424745	2008 SX_{300}	—	September 23, 2008	Catalina	CSS	·	3.3 km	MPC · JPL
424746	2008 SN_{302}	—	September 23, 2008	Kitt Peak	Spacewatch	·	2.1 km	MPC · JPL
424747	2008 SC_{305}	—	September 26, 2008	Kitt Peak	Spacewatch	BRA	1.5 km	MPC · JPL
424748	2008 SN_{305}	—	September 27, 2008	Mount Lemmon	Mount Lemmon Survey	·	1.8 km	MPC · JPL
424749	2008 TX	—	October 2, 2008	Catalina	CSS	H	700 m	MPC · JPL
424750	2008 TW_{21}	—	September 21, 2008	Mount Lemmon	Mount Lemmon Survey	ADE	2.4 km	MPC · JPL
424751	2008 TQ_{29}	—	October 1, 2008	Mount Lemmon	Mount Lemmon Survey	MRX	1.0 km	MPC · JPL
424752	2008 TW_{33}	—	October 1, 2008	Kitt Peak	Spacewatch	KOR	1.2 km	MPC · JPL
424753	2008 TA_{35}	—	October 1, 2008	Mount Lemmon	Mount Lemmon Survey	·	2.8 km	MPC · JPL
424754	2008 TG_{38}	—	October 1, 2008	Catalina	CSS	·	1.9 km	MPC · JPL
424755	2008 TO_{42}	—	October 1, 2008	Mount Lemmon	Mount Lemmon Survey	·	2.1 km	MPC · JPL
424756	2008 TZ_{44}	—	October 1, 2008	Mount Lemmon	Mount Lemmon Survey	EOS	1.6 km	MPC · JPL
424757	2008 TJ_{49}	—	October 2, 2008	Kitt Peak	Spacewatch	EOS	1.6 km	MPC · JPL
424758	2008 TB_{50}	—	September 20, 2008	Mount Lemmon	Mount Lemmon Survey	KOR	1.2 km	MPC · JPL
424759	2008 TF_{59}	—	October 2, 2008	Kitt Peak	Spacewatch	·	2.3 km	MPC · JPL
424760	2008 TM_{63}	—	October 2, 2008	Kitt Peak	Spacewatch	KOR	1.4 km	MPC · JPL
424761	2008 TH_{67}	—	September 23, 2008	Kitt Peak	Spacewatch	·	1.8 km	MPC · JPL
424762	2008 TK_{69}	—	September 23, 2008	Kitt Peak	Spacewatch	·	1.8 km	MPC · JPL
424763	2008 TQ_{75}	—	October 2, 2008	Kitt Peak	Spacewatch	·	1.3 km	MPC · JPL
424764	2008 TB_{77}	—	October 2, 2008	Mount Lemmon	Mount Lemmon Survey	·	2.1 km	MPC · JPL
424765	2008 TC_{78}	—	September 23, 2008	Mount Lemmon	Mount Lemmon Survey	·	1.7 km	MPC · JPL
424766	2008 TC_{80}	—	September 23, 2008	Mount Lemmon	Mount Lemmon Survey	KOR	1.5 km	MPC · JPL
424767	2008 TG_{81}	—	October 2, 2008	Mount Lemmon	Mount Lemmon Survey	·	2.0 km	MPC · JPL
424768	2008 TN_{85}	—	October 3, 2008	Mount Lemmon	Mount Lemmon Survey	·	2.2 km	MPC · JPL
424769	2008 TQ_{85}	—	October 3, 2008	Mount Lemmon	Mount Lemmon Survey	·	2.8 km	MPC · JPL
424770	2008 TZ_{88}	—	May 25, 2006	Mauna Kea	P. A. Wiegert	·	2.5 km	MPC · JPL
424771	2008 TA_{91}	—	October 3, 2008	Kitt Peak	Spacewatch	·	2.4 km	MPC · JPL
424772	2008 TE_{94}	—	September 26, 2008	Kitt Peak	Spacewatch	·	2.1 km	MPC · JPL
424773	2008 TK_{94}	—	September 26, 2008	Kitt Peak	Spacewatch	AGN	1.6 km	MPC · JPL
424774	2008 TJ_{95}	—	October 6, 2008	Kitt Peak	Spacewatch	PAD	1.4 km	MPC · JPL
424775	2008 TQ_{101}	—	October 6, 2008	Kitt Peak	Spacewatch	·	1.6 km	MPC · JPL
424776	2008 TB_{107}	—	October 6, 2008	Mount Lemmon	Mount Lemmon Survey	·	2.1 km	MPC · JPL
424777	2008 TL_{107}	—	September 23, 2008	Mount Lemmon	Mount Lemmon Survey	EOS	1.5 km	MPC · JPL
424778	2008 TL_{115}	—	October 6, 2008	Mount Lemmon	Mount Lemmon Survey	EOS	1.9 km	MPC · JPL
424779	2008 TQ_{115}	—	September 23, 2008	Kitt Peak	Spacewatch	·	2.0 km	MPC · JPL
424780	2008 TV_{122}	—	October 7, 2008	Kitt Peak	Spacewatch	·	2.1 km	MPC · JPL
424781	2008 TU_{129}	—	October 8, 2008	Mount Lemmon	Mount Lemmon Survey	EOS	1.9 km	MPC · JPL
424782	2008 TO_{131}	—	September 21, 2003	Kitt Peak	Spacewatch	·	2.1 km	MPC · JPL
424783	2008 TD_{150}	—	October 9, 2008	Mount Lemmon	Mount Lemmon Survey	AGN	1.3 km	MPC · JPL
424784	2008 TR_{150}	—	November 26, 2003	Kitt Peak	Spacewatch	·	2.0 km	MPC · JPL
424785	2008 TG_{155}	—	October 9, 2008	Mount Lemmon	Mount Lemmon Survey	·	4.0 km	MPC · JPL
424786	2008 TG_{156}	—	October 9, 2008	Mount Lemmon	Mount Lemmon Survey	·	3.3 km	MPC · JPL
424787	2008 TE_{160}	—	October 1, 2008	Kitt Peak	Spacewatch	·	1.9 km	MPC · JPL
424788	2008 TK_{167}	—	October 8, 2008	Kitt Peak	Spacewatch	·	1.9 km	MPC · JPL
424789	2008 TP_{174}	—	October 6, 2008	Kitt Peak	Spacewatch	KOR	1.3 km	MPC · JPL
424790	2008 TD_{176}	—	September 27, 2003	Kitt Peak	Spacewatch	·	1.7 km	MPC · JPL
424791	2008 TA_{182}	—	April 2, 2006	Kitt Peak	Spacewatch	·	3.1 km	MPC · JPL
424792	2008 TM_{188}	—	October 9, 2008	Mount Lemmon	Mount Lemmon Survey	·	1.9 km	MPC · JPL
424793	2008 TP_{188}	—	October 10, 2008	Mount Lemmon	Mount Lemmon Survey	·	3.0 km	MPC · JPL
424794	2008 UZ_{13}	—	October 17, 2008	Kitt Peak	Spacewatch	·	2.5 km	MPC · JPL
424795	2008 UE_{28}	—	September 24, 2008	Mount Lemmon	Mount Lemmon Survey	EMA	3.3 km	MPC · JPL
424796	2008 UM_{29}	—	October 20, 2008	Kitt Peak	Spacewatch	·	1.8 km	MPC · JPL
424797	2008 UC_{32}	—	October 20, 2008	Kitt Peak	Spacewatch	·	1.9 km	MPC · JPL
424798	2008 UW_{34}	—	October 6, 2008	Mount Lemmon	Mount Lemmon Survey	·	2.1 km	MPC · JPL
424799	2008 UY_{41}	—	October 20, 2008	Kitt Peak	Spacewatch	·	3.0 km	MPC · JPL
424800	2008 UJ_{50}	—	September 21, 2008	Kitt Peak	Spacewatch	·	1.6 km	MPC · JPL

== 424801–424900 ==
back to top

Designation			Discovery			Properties		Ref
Permanent	Provisional	Named after	Date	Site	Discoverer(s)	Category	Diam.	Ref
424801	2008 UF_{52}	—	September 29, 2008	Mount Lemmon	Mount Lemmon Survey	·	2.4 km	MPC · JPL
424802	2008 UR_{56}	—	September 25, 2008	Mount Lemmon	Mount Lemmon Survey	·	1.7 km	MPC · JPL
424803	2008 UE_{61}	—	October 21, 2008	Kitt Peak	Spacewatch	·	3.1 km	MPC · JPL
424804	2008 UV_{74}	—	October 21, 2008	Kitt Peak	Spacewatch	·	2.1 km	MPC · JPL
424805	2008 UO_{75}	—	October 21, 2008	Kitt Peak	Spacewatch	·	2.8 km	MPC · JPL
424806	2008 UL_{104}	—	January 28, 2006	Kitt Peak	Spacewatch	·	1.9 km	MPC · JPL
424807	2008 UQ_{105}	—	September 5, 2008	Kitt Peak	Spacewatch	THM	2.4 km	MPC · JPL
424808	2008 UB_{107}	—	October 21, 2008	Kitt Peak	Spacewatch	KOR	1.4 km	MPC · JPL
424809	2008 UO_{113}	—	October 22, 2008	Kitt Peak	Spacewatch	·	2.0 km	MPC · JPL
424810	2008 UJ_{115}	—	October 22, 2008	Kitt Peak	Spacewatch	·	2.9 km	MPC · JPL
424811	2008 UJ_{125}	—	October 22, 2008	Kitt Peak	Spacewatch	·	2.8 km	MPC · JPL
424812	2008 UK_{127}	—	October 22, 2008	Kitt Peak	Spacewatch	·	1.9 km	MPC · JPL
424813	2008 UR_{128}	—	October 23, 2008	Kitt Peak	Spacewatch	·	1.9 km	MPC · JPL
424814	2008 UX_{132}	—	October 23, 2008	Kitt Peak	Spacewatch	·	1.7 km	MPC · JPL
424815	2008 UK_{137}	—	October 23, 2008	Kitt Peak	Spacewatch	·	2.2 km	MPC · JPL
424816	2008 UC_{139}	—	October 23, 2008	Kitt Peak	Spacewatch	·	2.5 km	MPC · JPL
424817	2008 UA_{141}	—	October 23, 2008	Kitt Peak	Spacewatch	·	2.2 km	MPC · JPL
424818	2008 UB_{141}	—	September 22, 2008	Mount Lemmon	Mount Lemmon Survey	VER	2.6 km	MPC · JPL
424819	2008 UY_{146}	—	October 23, 2008	Kitt Peak	Spacewatch	JUN	1.3 km	MPC · JPL
424820	2008 UX_{149}	—	September 23, 2008	Kitt Peak	Spacewatch	(12739)	1.7 km	MPC · JPL
424821	2008 UG_{161}	—	October 24, 2008	Kitt Peak	Spacewatch	·	1.9 km	MPC · JPL
424822	2008 UX_{161}	—	October 24, 2008	Kitt Peak	Spacewatch	EOS	3.6 km	MPC · JPL
424823	2008 UF_{165}	—	October 1, 2008	Kitt Peak	Spacewatch	·	1.9 km	MPC · JPL
424824	2008 UO_{173}	—	September 23, 2008	Kitt Peak	Spacewatch	·	2.6 km	MPC · JPL
424825	2008 UD_{185}	—	October 24, 2008	Kitt Peak	Spacewatch	·	3.4 km	MPC · JPL
424826	2008 UR_{200}	—	October 27, 2008	Socorro	LINEAR	T_{j} (2.91)	3.6 km	MPC · JPL
424827	2008 UT_{201}	—	September 22, 2008	Mount Lemmon	Mount Lemmon Survey	·	2.7 km	MPC · JPL
424828	2008 UK_{210}	—	September 22, 2003	Kitt Peak	Spacewatch	KOR	1.3 km	MPC · JPL
424829	2008 US_{217}	—	October 25, 2008	Kitt Peak	Spacewatch	HOF	3.1 km	MPC · JPL
424830	2008 US_{229}	—	October 25, 2008	Kitt Peak	Spacewatch	·	3.2 km	MPC · JPL
424831	2008 UP_{236}	—	September 29, 2008	Mount Lemmon	Mount Lemmon Survey	·	2.9 km	MPC · JPL
424832	2008 UJ_{240}	—	October 26, 2008	Kitt Peak	Spacewatch	·	2.8 km	MPC · JPL
424833	2008 UH_{241}	—	October 26, 2008	Kitt Peak	Spacewatch	·	6.0 km	MPC · JPL
424834	2008 UJ_{241}	—	October 26, 2008	Kitt Peak	Spacewatch	·	1.8 km	MPC · JPL
424835	2008 UW_{249}	—	October 7, 2008	Kitt Peak	Spacewatch	·	2.1 km	MPC · JPL
424836	2008 UC_{250}	—	September 23, 2008	Kitt Peak	Spacewatch	·	1.6 km	MPC · JPL
424837	2008 UG_{259}	—	October 27, 2008	Kitt Peak	Spacewatch	·	1.8 km	MPC · JPL
424838	2008 UY_{259}	—	October 27, 2008	Kitt Peak	Spacewatch	·	2.1 km	MPC · JPL
424839	2008 UQ_{260}	—	October 27, 2008	Mount Lemmon	Mount Lemmon Survey	·	1.8 km	MPC · JPL
424840	2008 UR_{264}	—	October 28, 2008	Kitt Peak	Spacewatch	·	4.4 km	MPC · JPL
424841	2008 UH_{274}	—	October 28, 2008	Kitt Peak	Spacewatch	·	2.3 km	MPC · JPL
424842	2008 UA_{275}	—	March 4, 2006	Mount Lemmon	Mount Lemmon Survey	·	1.9 km	MPC · JPL
424843	2008 UV_{275}	—	October 28, 2008	Mount Lemmon	Mount Lemmon Survey	·	1.6 km	MPC · JPL
424844	2008 UK_{276}	—	September 29, 2008	Kitt Peak	Spacewatch	HOF	2.7 km	MPC · JPL
424845	2008 UL_{276}	—	October 28, 2008	Mount Lemmon	Mount Lemmon Survey	·	1.8 km	MPC · JPL
424846	2008 UK_{284}	—	October 28, 2008	Mount Lemmon	Mount Lemmon Survey	EOS	1.3 km	MPC · JPL
424847	2008 US_{297}	—	October 29, 2008	Kitt Peak	Spacewatch	VER	2.4 km	MPC · JPL
424848	2008 UP_{299}	—	October 29, 2008	Kitt Peak	Spacewatch	·	2.3 km	MPC · JPL
424849	2008 UK_{323}	—	September 28, 1997	Kitt Peak	Spacewatch	·	2.0 km	MPC · JPL
424850	2008 UO_{324}	—	October 31, 2008	Kitt Peak	Spacewatch	·	3.4 km	MPC · JPL
424851	2008 UK_{327}	—	October 29, 2008	Catalina	CSS	T_{j} (2.91)	2.8 km	MPC · JPL
424852	2008 UG_{335}	—	October 22, 2008	Kitt Peak	Spacewatch	·	2.2 km	MPC · JPL
424853	2008 UQ_{335}	—	October 20, 2008	Kitt Peak	Spacewatch	·	1.4 km	MPC · JPL
424854	2008 UA_{339}	—	October 22, 2008	Kitt Peak	Spacewatch	·	1.6 km	MPC · JPL
424855	2008 UY_{342}	—	October 31, 2008	Kitt Peak	Spacewatch	EOS	2.5 km	MPC · JPL
424856	2008 UG_{343}	—	October 23, 2008	Mount Lemmon	Mount Lemmon Survey	·	1.8 km	MPC · JPL
424857	2008 UP_{345}	—	October 31, 2008	Kitt Peak	Spacewatch	·	2.8 km	MPC · JPL
424858	2008 UT_{355}	—	October 26, 2008	Mount Lemmon	Mount Lemmon Survey	·	2.5 km	MPC · JPL
424859	2008 UB_{356}	—	October 20, 2008	Kitt Peak	Spacewatch	·	1.9 km	MPC · JPL
424860	2008 UZ_{357}	—	October 25, 2008	Kitt Peak	Spacewatch	EOS	2.0 km	MPC · JPL
424861	2008 UH_{358}	—	October 26, 2008	Kitt Peak	Spacewatch	·	1.8 km	MPC · JPL
424862	2008 UJ_{363}	—	October 9, 2008	Catalina	CSS	·	2.7 km	MPC · JPL
424863	2008 UG_{370}	—	October 26, 2008	Mount Lemmon	Mount Lemmon Survey	T_{j} (2.95)	2.8 km	MPC · JPL
424864	2008 VM_{5}	—	November 1, 2008	Mount Lemmon	Mount Lemmon Survey	·	3.1 km	MPC · JPL
424865	2008 VH_{16}	—	September 25, 2008	Kitt Peak	Spacewatch	·	2.3 km	MPC · JPL
424866	2008 VL_{25}	—	November 2, 2008	Kitt Peak	Spacewatch	·	2.1 km	MPC · JPL
424867	2008 VG_{28}	—	November 2, 2008	Kitt Peak	Spacewatch	VER	3.3 km	MPC · JPL
424868	2008 VC_{32}	—	November 2, 2008	Mount Lemmon	Mount Lemmon Survey	·	2.0 km	MPC · JPL
424869	2008 VO_{34}	—	October 10, 2008	Mount Lemmon	Mount Lemmon Survey	·	2.5 km	MPC · JPL
424870	2008 VH_{38}	—	November 2, 2008	Kitt Peak	Spacewatch	(1118)	4.7 km	MPC · JPL
424871	2008 VO_{52}	—	September 23, 2008	Kitt Peak	Spacewatch	·	1.5 km	MPC · JPL
424872	2008 VX_{52}	—	October 25, 2008	Kitt Peak	Spacewatch	·	3.2 km	MPC · JPL
424873	2008 VX_{53}	—	November 6, 2008	Mount Lemmon	Mount Lemmon Survey	EOS	2.0 km	MPC · JPL
424874	2008 VE_{58}	—	October 24, 2008	Catalina	CSS	·	1.8 km	MPC · JPL
424875	2008 VN_{69}	—	November 8, 2008	Kitt Peak	Spacewatch	·	2.0 km	MPC · JPL
424876	2008 VO_{69}	—	November 8, 2008	Kitt Peak	Spacewatch	·	2.6 km	MPC · JPL
424877	2008 VA_{71}	—	November 9, 2008	Kitt Peak	Spacewatch	VER	2.7 km	MPC · JPL
424878	2008 VN_{71}	—	November 8, 2008	Catalina	CSS	·	3.2 km	MPC · JPL
424879	2008 VB_{73}	—	November 1, 2008	Mount Lemmon	Mount Lemmon Survey	·	2.0 km	MPC · JPL
424880	2008 VS_{73}	—	November 7, 2008	Mount Lemmon	Mount Lemmon Survey	KOR	1.4 km	MPC · JPL
424881	2008 VW_{73}	—	November 7, 2008	Mount Lemmon	Mount Lemmon Survey	·	3.2 km	MPC · JPL
424882	2008 VV_{76}	—	November 2, 2008	Mount Lemmon	Mount Lemmon Survey	·	2.2 km	MPC · JPL
424883	2008 VE_{77}	—	November 2, 2008	Mount Lemmon	Mount Lemmon Survey	·	2.9 km	MPC · JPL
424884	2008 VQ_{78}	—	November 7, 2008	Mount Lemmon	Mount Lemmon Survey	·	2.8 km	MPC · JPL
424885	2008 VG_{79}	—	November 2, 2008	Socorro	LINEAR	·	3.6 km	MPC · JPL
424886	2008 VN_{80}	—	November 2, 2008	Mount Lemmon	Mount Lemmon Survey	CYB	5.7 km	MPC · JPL
424887	2008 WT_{10}	—	September 22, 2008	Mount Lemmon	Mount Lemmon Survey	THM	2.0 km	MPC · JPL
424888	2008 WV_{13}	—	November 18, 2008	Catalina	CSS	·	2.7 km	MPC · JPL
424889	2008 WZ_{14}	—	November 17, 2008	Kitt Peak	Spacewatch	·	4.9 km	MPC · JPL
424890	2008 WC_{25}	—	November 18, 2008	Catalina	CSS	·	2.0 km	MPC · JPL
424891	2008 WQ_{29}	—	November 19, 2008	Kitt Peak	Spacewatch	·	2.4 km	MPC · JPL
424892	2008 WH_{33}	—	November 21, 2008	Pla D'Arguines	R. Ferrando	VER	3.7 km	MPC · JPL
424893	2008 WN_{33}	—	October 2, 2008	Kitt Peak	Spacewatch	HYG	2.8 km	MPC · JPL
424894	2008 WO_{37}	—	November 17, 2008	Kitt Peak	Spacewatch	THM	1.8 km	MPC · JPL
424895	2008 WH_{38}	—	November 17, 2008	Kitt Peak	Spacewatch	·	1.8 km	MPC · JPL
424896	2008 WT_{38}	—	October 27, 2008	Kitt Peak	Spacewatch	·	3.6 km	MPC · JPL
424897	2008 WZ_{39}	—	November 17, 2008	Kitt Peak	Spacewatch	·	1.7 km	MPC · JPL
424898	2008 WP_{43}	—	November 17, 2008	Kitt Peak	Spacewatch	·	2.6 km	MPC · JPL
424899	2008 WO_{46}	—	November 17, 2008	Kitt Peak	Spacewatch	THM	2.1 km	MPC · JPL
424900	2008 WN_{50}	—	November 18, 2008	Kitt Peak	Spacewatch	·	2.0 km	MPC · JPL

== 424901–425000 ==
back to top

Designation			Discovery			Properties		Ref
Permanent	Provisional	Named after	Date	Site	Discoverer(s)	Category	Diam.	Ref
424901	2008 WB_{51}	—	November 9, 2008	Kitt Peak	Spacewatch	TEL	1.3 km	MPC · JPL
424902	2008 WF_{55}	—	October 23, 2008	Mount Lemmon	Mount Lemmon Survey	·	1.6 km	MPC · JPL
424903	2008 WD_{59}	—	November 22, 2008	Farra d'Isonzo	Farra d'Isonzo	·	5.3 km	MPC · JPL
424904	2008 WG_{62}	—	November 23, 2008	La Sagra	OAM	·	3.2 km	MPC · JPL
424905	2008 WX_{62}	—	November 21, 2008	Bisei SG Center	BATTeRS	·	4.8 km	MPC · JPL
424906	2008 WE_{66}	—	October 6, 2008	Mount Lemmon	Mount Lemmon Survey	·	2.3 km	MPC · JPL
424907	2008 WX_{67}	—	November 18, 2008	Kitt Peak	Spacewatch	·	3.1 km	MPC · JPL
424908	2008 WZ_{72}	—	March 16, 2005	Mount Lemmon	Mount Lemmon Survey	·	2.2 km	MPC · JPL
424909	2008 WL_{77}	—	November 20, 2008	Kitt Peak	Spacewatch	EOS	1.7 km	MPC · JPL
424910	2008 WK_{82}	—	November 20, 2008	Kitt Peak	Spacewatch	·	2.6 km	MPC · JPL
424911	2008 WF_{84}	—	November 20, 2008	Kitt Peak	Spacewatch	EOS	1.9 km	MPC · JPL
424912	2008 WO_{86}	—	September 28, 2008	Mount Lemmon	Mount Lemmon Survey	·	1.9 km	MPC · JPL
424913	2008 WP_{86}	—	November 21, 2008	Mount Lemmon	Mount Lemmon Survey	·	2.1 km	MPC · JPL
424914	2008 WC_{94}	—	May 8, 2006	Mount Lemmon	Mount Lemmon Survey	·	2.2 km	MPC · JPL
424915	2008 WB_{96}	—	November 25, 2008	Cerro Burek	Burek, Cerro	·	2.6 km	MPC · JPL
424916	2008 WZ_{100}	—	November 24, 2008	Kitt Peak	Spacewatch	·	3.6 km	MPC · JPL
424917	2008 WT_{129}	—	November 18, 2008	Kitt Peak	Spacewatch	·	2.2 km	MPC · JPL
424918	2008 WA_{130}	—	November 19, 2008	Kitt Peak	Spacewatch	URS	4.0 km	MPC · JPL
424919	2008 WH_{138}	—	November 30, 2008	Socorro	LINEAR	·	3.9 km	MPC · JPL
424920	2008 XP_{21}	—	December 1, 2008	Kitt Peak	Spacewatch	·	4.5 km	MPC · JPL
424921	2008 XS_{22}	—	December 3, 2008	Kitt Peak	Spacewatch	·	2.3 km	MPC · JPL
424922	2008 XR_{23}	—	October 30, 2008	Kitt Peak	Spacewatch	·	3.6 km	MPC · JPL
424923	2008 XR_{44}	—	November 22, 2008	Kitt Peak	Spacewatch	·	4.2 km	MPC · JPL
424924	2008 XK_{51}	—	October 3, 2008	Mount Lemmon	Mount Lemmon Survey	·	3.5 km	MPC · JPL
424925	2008 YP_{4}	—	November 24, 2008	Mount Lemmon	Mount Lemmon Survey	·	2.2 km	MPC · JPL
424926	2008 YM_{5}	—	November 19, 2008	Mount Lemmon	Mount Lemmon Survey	·	2.3 km	MPC · JPL
424927	2008 YJ_{6}	—	December 22, 2008	Dauban	Kugel, F.	·	2.7 km	MPC · JPL
424928	2008 YG_{12}	—	November 30, 2008	Kitt Peak	Spacewatch	·	2.2 km	MPC · JPL
424929	2008 YV_{13}	—	November 30, 2008	Kitt Peak	Spacewatch	·	3.5 km	MPC · JPL
424930	2008 YA_{20}	—	December 21, 2008	Mount Lemmon	Mount Lemmon Survey	·	2.0 km	MPC · JPL
424931	2008 YQ_{22}	—	December 21, 2008	Mount Lemmon	Mount Lemmon Survey	·	6.3 km	MPC · JPL
424932	2008 YP_{38}	—	October 31, 2008	Mount Lemmon	Mount Lemmon Survey	·	2.8 km	MPC · JPL
424933	2008 YZ_{50}	—	October 18, 2007	Mount Lemmon	Mount Lemmon Survey	THM	2.4 km	MPC · JPL
424934	2008 YP_{59}	—	December 30, 2008	Kitt Peak	Spacewatch	THM	1.9 km	MPC · JPL
424935	2008 YU_{63}	—	December 30, 2008	Mount Lemmon	Mount Lemmon Survey	·	3.0 km	MPC · JPL
424936	2008 YH_{65}	—	December 30, 2008	Mount Lemmon	Mount Lemmon Survey	·	800 m	MPC · JPL
424937	2008 YM_{77}	—	December 30, 2008	Mount Lemmon	Mount Lemmon Survey	·	3.6 km	MPC · JPL
424938	2008 YN_{80}	—	December 30, 2008	Kitt Peak	Spacewatch	·	3.1 km	MPC · JPL
424939	2008 YL_{85}	—	December 21, 2008	Mount Lemmon	Mount Lemmon Survey	·	3.0 km	MPC · JPL
424940	2008 YD_{91}	—	December 4, 2008	Mount Lemmon	Mount Lemmon Survey	·	2.9 km	MPC · JPL
424941	2008 YV_{102}	—	December 21, 2008	Mount Lemmon	Mount Lemmon Survey	VER	3.0 km	MPC · JPL
424942	2008 YC_{105}	—	December 29, 2008	Kitt Peak	Spacewatch	·	6.0 km	MPC · JPL
424943	2008 YH_{106}	—	December 29, 2008	Kitt Peak	Spacewatch	(11097) · CYB	2.5 km	MPC · JPL
424944	2008 YN_{106}	—	December 29, 2008	Kitt Peak	Spacewatch	·	5.2 km	MPC · JPL
424945	2008 YT_{108}	—	December 29, 2008	Kitt Peak	Spacewatch	THM	2.2 km	MPC · JPL
424946	2008 YJ_{118}	—	December 29, 2008	Mount Lemmon	Mount Lemmon Survey	·	2.3 km	MPC · JPL
424947	2008 YQ_{118}	—	December 29, 2008	Kitt Peak	Spacewatch	(260) · CYB	3.9 km	MPC · JPL
424948	2008 YM_{124}	—	December 30, 2008	Kitt Peak	Spacewatch	·	5.6 km	MPC · JPL
424949	2008 YW_{125}	—	November 8, 2008	Mount Lemmon	Mount Lemmon Survey	·	2.6 km	MPC · JPL
424950	2008 YA_{129}	—	December 31, 2008	Kitt Peak	Spacewatch	·	3.1 km	MPC · JPL
424951	2008 YU_{136}	—	December 30, 2008	Kitt Peak	Spacewatch	·	3.5 km	MPC · JPL
424952	2008 YY_{149}	—	December 21, 2008	Kitt Peak	Spacewatch	·	3.5 km	MPC · JPL
424953	2008 YG_{150}	—	December 21, 2008	Kitt Peak	Spacewatch	·	640 m	MPC · JPL
424954	2008 YK_{150}	—	December 21, 2008	Kitt Peak	Spacewatch	·	4.1 km	MPC · JPL
424955	2008 YR_{158}	—	December 30, 2008	Mount Lemmon	Mount Lemmon Survey	CYB	3.8 km	MPC · JPL
424956	2008 YK_{160}	—	December 30, 2008	Mount Lemmon	Mount Lemmon Survey	THB	2.8 km	MPC · JPL
424957	2008 YE_{162}	—	December 21, 2008	Mount Lemmon	Mount Lemmon Survey	THM	2.3 km	MPC · JPL
424958	2008 YL_{163}	—	December 30, 2008	Kitt Peak	Spacewatch	·	3.1 km	MPC · JPL
424959	2008 YG_{165}	—	December 31, 2008	Kitt Peak	Spacewatch	·	3.7 km	MPC · JPL
424960	2008 YE_{169}	—	December 22, 2008	Mount Lemmon	Mount Lemmon Survey	·	2.8 km	MPC · JPL
424961	2008 YB_{170}	—	December 22, 2008	Mount Lemmon	Mount Lemmon Survey	·	2.6 km	MPC · JPL
424962	2008 YO_{170}	—	December 30, 2008	Mount Lemmon	Mount Lemmon Survey	·	4.3 km	MPC · JPL
424963	2009 AW_{3}	—	January 1, 2009	Mount Lemmon	Mount Lemmon Survey	·	2.5 km	MPC · JPL
424964	2009 AG_{5}	—	January 1, 2009	Kitt Peak	Spacewatch	·	3.3 km	MPC · JPL
424965	2009 AM_{15}	—	January 6, 2009	Siding Spring	SSS	ATE	630 m	MPC · JPL
424966	2009 AH_{39}	—	November 15, 2007	Mount Lemmon	Mount Lemmon Survey	VER	3.9 km	MPC · JPL
424967	2009 AA_{40}	—	January 15, 2009	Kitt Peak	Spacewatch	·	4.4 km	MPC · JPL
424968	2009 BN_{1}	—	January 17, 2009	Sierra Stars	Tozzi, F.	·	5.5 km	MPC · JPL
424969	2009 BT_{5}	—	January 20, 2009	Kitt Peak	Spacewatch	AMO · critical	260 m	MPC · JPL
424970	2009 BQ_{8}	—	December 7, 2008	Mount Lemmon	Mount Lemmon Survey	·	3.7 km	MPC · JPL
424971	2009 BY_{15}	—	January 1, 2009	Kitt Peak	Spacewatch	·	3.8 km	MPC · JPL
424972	2009 BV_{20}	—	January 16, 2009	Mount Lemmon	Mount Lemmon Survey	·	3.3 km	MPC · JPL
424973	2009 BD_{45}	—	January 16, 2009	Kitt Peak	Spacewatch	·	2.7 km	MPC · JPL
424974	2009 BA_{49}	—	January 16, 2009	Mount Lemmon	Mount Lemmon Survey	HYG	2.9 km	MPC · JPL
424975	2009 BQ_{55}	—	January 16, 2009	Lulin	LUSS	·	2.8 km	MPC · JPL
424976	2009 BD_{73}	—	December 21, 2008	Catalina	CSS	LIX	2.4 km	MPC · JPL
424977	2009 BP_{100}	—	January 29, 2009	Kitt Peak	Spacewatch	·	2.5 km	MPC · JPL
424978	2009 BG_{106}	—	January 25, 2009	Kitt Peak	Spacewatch	·	3.2 km	MPC · JPL
424979	2009 BR_{114}	—	January 26, 2009	Kitt Peak	Spacewatch	·	3.4 km	MPC · JPL
424980	2009 BY_{121}	—	January 31, 2009	Kitt Peak	Spacewatch	·	4.6 km	MPC · JPL
424981	2009 BM_{133}	—	January 29, 2009	Kitt Peak	Spacewatch	·	2.8 km	MPC · JPL
424982	2009 BA_{153}	—	January 31, 2009	Kitt Peak	Spacewatch	·	2.7 km	MPC · JPL
424983	2009 BR_{159}	—	January 29, 2009	Mount Lemmon	Mount Lemmon Survey	EOS	2.1 km	MPC · JPL
424984	2009 BE_{161}	—	January 31, 2009	Mount Lemmon	Mount Lemmon Survey	·	2.7 km	MPC · JPL
424985	2009 BR_{182}	—	January 18, 2009	Kitt Peak	Spacewatch	·	3.6 km	MPC · JPL
424986	2009 BX_{187}	—	January 17, 2009	Kitt Peak	Spacewatch	·	2.4 km	MPC · JPL
424987	2009 BB_{188}	—	January 22, 2009	Socorro	LINEAR	·	4.1 km	MPC · JPL
424988	2009 BS_{189}	—	January 20, 2009	Socorro	LINEAR	LIX	3.5 km	MPC · JPL
424989	2009 CF_{7}	—	February 1, 2009	Kitt Peak	Spacewatch	·	960 m	MPC · JPL
424990	2009 CU_{17}	—	February 3, 2009	Kitt Peak	Spacewatch	·	3.8 km	MPC · JPL
424991	2009 CB_{19}	—	February 3, 2009	Mount Lemmon	Mount Lemmon Survey	·	3.5 km	MPC · JPL
424992	2009 CB_{21}	—	February 1, 2009	Kitt Peak	Spacewatch	EOS	1.8 km	MPC · JPL
424993	2009 CH_{30}	—	February 1, 2009	Kitt Peak	Spacewatch	·	2.5 km	MPC · JPL
424994	2009 CM_{36}	—	February 3, 2009	Kitt Peak	Spacewatch	·	2.5 km	MPC · JPL
424995	2009 CY_{37}	—	February 14, 2009	Dauban	Kugel, F.	·	3.6 km	MPC · JPL
424996	2009 CZ_{40}	—	January 15, 2009	Kitt Peak	Spacewatch	·	3.4 km	MPC · JPL
424997	2009 CH_{45}	—	September 9, 2007	Kitt Peak	Spacewatch	·	1.8 km	MPC · JPL
424998	2009 CU_{48}	—	February 14, 2009	Mount Lemmon	Mount Lemmon Survey	·	4.8 km	MPC · JPL
424999	2009 CB_{58}	—	February 3, 2009	Mount Lemmon	Mount Lemmon Survey	·	2.9 km	MPC · JPL
425000	2009 CG_{61}	—	January 29, 2009	Mount Lemmon	Mount Lemmon Survey	EOS	2.3 km	MPC · JPL

back to top

== Meaning of names ==
As minor planet discoveries are confirmed, they are given a permanent number by the IAU's Minor Planet Center (MPC), and the discoverers can then submit names for them, following the IAU's naming conventions. The list below concerns those minor planets in the specified number-range that have received names, and explains the meanings of those names.

Official naming citations of newly named small Solar System bodies are approved and published in a bulletin by IAU's Working Group for Small Bodies Nomenclature (WGSBN). Before May 2021, citations were published in MPC's Minor Planet Circulars for many decades. Recent citations can also be found on the JPL Small-Body Database (SBDB). Until his death in 2016, German astronomer Lutz D. Schmadel compiled these citations into the Dictionary of Minor Planet Names (DMP) and regularly updated the collection.

Based on Paul Herget's The Names of the Minor Planets, Schmadel also researched the unclear origin of numerous asteroids, most of which had been named prior to World War II. This article incorporates text from this source, which is in the public domain: SBDB New namings may only be added to this list below after official publication as the preannouncement of names is condemned. The WGSBN publishes a comprehensive guideline for the naming rules of non-cometary small Solar System bodies.

Named minor planet	Provisional	This minor planet was named for...	Ref · Catalog
424200 Tonicelia	2007 NV_{1}	Antonio Celia Miro (born 1969), a Spanish software engineer and advanced amateur astronomer.	JPL · 424200
424613 Kraszewski	2008 JC_{6}	Józef Ignacy Kraszewski, Polish novelist, historian, publisher, painter, and musician.	IAU · 424613
