= Wolfgang Ries =

Austrian amateur astronomer and astrophotographer

Minor planets discovered: 157
see § List of discovered minor planets

Wolfgang Ries (born 1968) is an Austrian amateur astronomer, astrophotographer and discoverer of minor planets.

Ries has his own private observatory at Altschwendt in the Austrian state of Upper Austria. The Minor Planet Center credits him with discovering numerous asteroids since 2004 and 2009.

The main-belt asteroid 266887 Wolfgangries was named after him. Naming citation was published on 22 July 2013 (M.P.C. 84383).

== List of discovered minor planets ==
117156 Altschwendt	23 August 2004	list
128585 Alfredmaria	18 August 2004	list
128586 Jeremias	16 August 2004	list
136367 Gierlinger	10 March 2004	list
144333 Marcinkiewicz	20 February 2004	list
154865 Stefanheutz	9 September 2004	list
(167854) 2005 ES	1 March 2005	list
(171421) 2007 AG_{11}	14 January 2007	list
172932 Bachleitner	1 May 2005	list
173002 Dorfi	17 July 2006	list
(178172) 2006 UM_{64}	22 October 2006	list
(184631) 2005 SK_{4}	24 September 2005	list
(184632) 2005 SO_{9}	25 September 2005	list
(187559) 2006 VV_{51}	10 November 2006	list
(192186) 2007 GA_{5}	12 April 2007	list
(199836) 2007 EE_{27}	12 March 2007	list
(204874) 2007 SR_{4}	20 September 2007	list
(207731) 2007 RZ_{187}	14 September 2007	list
207754 Stathiskafalis	21 September 2007	list
(209354) 2004 DS_{25}	20 February 2004	list
(212677) 2006 VE_{45}	9 November 2006	list
(214542) 2006 OV_{9}	24 July 2006	list
(214991) 2008 CM_{21}	7 February 2008	list
218400 Marquardt	22 August 2004	list
(221673) 2007 DP	17 February 2007	list

(224863) 2007 AP_{12}	13 January 2007	list
(225057) 2007 HK	16 April 2007	list
227770 Wischnewski	30 October 2006	list
229425 Grosspointner	11 October 2005	list
229440 Filimon	27 October 2005	list
229723 Marcoludwig	11 April 2007	list
(236894) 2007 TN_{14}	7 October 2007	list
(237299) 2008 YR_{33}	31 December 2008	list
(239382) 2007 SM_{6}	22 September 2007	list
(246254) 2007 TV_{7}	7 October 2007	list
(246258) 2007 TU_{14}	8 October 2007	list
(246289) 2007 TC_{73}	14 October 2007	list
(249036) 2007 TV_{20}	9 October 2007	list
(250547) 2004 RM_{84}	9 September 2004	list
(251413) 2008 AA_{30}	8 January 2008	list
(256452) 2007 CN_{47}	9 February 2007	list
(256573) 2007 TP_{74}	10 October 2007	list
(262385) 2006 UT	16 October 2006	list
(262386) 2006 UD_{1}	17 October 2006	list
(264056) 2009 SN_{18}	19 September 2009	list
266286 Bodenmüller	21 January 2007	list
(268873) 2007 AK_{11}	14 January 2007	list
(273687) 2007 EG_{27}	12 March 2007	list
(274007) 2007 PN_{39}	15 August 2007	list
(274058) 2007 TD_{69}	13 October 2007	list

(278275) 2007 GF_{2}	10 April 2007	list
(281444) 2008 SR_{83}	27 September 2008	list
282897 Kaltenbrunner	15 April 2007	list
(283038) 2008 BS_{14}	28 January 2008	list
(292615) 2006 UC_{1}	16 October 2006	list
(293536) 2007 HL	16 April 2007	list
(293679) 2007 PO_{28}	14 August 2007	list
(293986) 2007 TG_{69}	13 October 2007	list
(295566) 2008 ST_{83}	28 September 2008	list
(296404) 2009 GT_{1}	12 April 2009	list
(298803) 2004 RJ_{8}	6 September 2004	list
(300312) 2007 PR_{28}	15 August 2007	list
(304936) 2007 SG_{2}	19 September 2007	list
(308985) 2006 UA_{1}	16 October 2006	list
(309357) 2007 TJ_{69}	14 October 2007	list
(312294) 2008 CE_{1}	3 February 2008	list
(312370) 2008 EV_{8}	6 March 2008	list
(312469) 2008 SN_{83}	27 September 2008	list
(315257) 2007 TO_{14}	7 October 2007	list
(318451) 2005 ET_{1}	2 March 2005	list
(319464) 2006 OU_{9}	24 July 2006	list
(320012) 2007 DE_{49}	22 February 2007	list
(320167) 2007 GZ_{3}	11 April 2007	list
(320258) 2007 PO_{27}	14 August 2007	list
(321383) 2009 PX_{1}	15 August 2009	list

(321403) 2009 QJ	16 August 2009	list
(324994) 2008 BV_{14}	28 January 2008	list
(325020) 2008 CA_{21}	8 February 2008	list
(325034) 2008 CB_{75}	10 February 2008	list
(325441) 2009 QK	16 August 2009	list
(325559) 2009 SQ_{102}	23 September 2009	list
(325560) 2009 SY_{104}	26 September 2009	list
(327926) 2007 DF_{49}	23 February 2007	list
328432 Thomasposch	7 October 2008	list
(328568) 2009 SB_{19}	21 September 2009	list
(332545) 2008 QM_{15}	27 August 2008	list
(333590) 2007 CU_{26}	9 February 2007	list
(335855) 2007 RD_{16}	12 September 2007	list
(335930) 2007 TW_{20}	9 October 2007	list
(341149) 2007 PL_{28}	15 August 2007	list
(341321) 2007 TK_{14}	7 October 2007	list
(341322) 2007 TM_{14}	7 October 2007	list
342000 Neumünster	2 September 2008	list
(345133) 2005 SL_{4}	24 September 2005	list
(345791) 2007 GC_{6}	13 April 2007	list
(346227) 2008 AK_{3}	8 January 2008	list
(349225) 2007 TL_{14}	7 October 2007	list
(352230) 2007 TD_{73}	14 October 2007	list
(352282) 2007 TR_{372}	13 October 2007	list
(353137) 2009 GU_{1}	12 April 2009	list

(356146) 2009 GV_{1}	12 April 2009	list
(358524) 2007 SL_{2}	20 September 2007	list
(358724) 2008 CD_{1}	3 February 2008	list
(358978) 2008 SO_{83}	27 September 2008	list
(361308) 2006 UV	16 October 2006	list
(361523) 2007 FN_{34}	25 March 2007	list
(361772) 2008 AY_{29}	10 January 2008	list
(371756) 2007 FM_{34}	25 March 2007	list
(371922) 2008 EE_{7}	5 March 2008	list
(375311) 2008 RM_{26}	8 September 2008	list
(375700) 2009 PY_{1}	15 August 2009	list
(377633) 2005 TW_{51}	12 October 2005	list
(381235) 2007 TJ_{14}	7 October 2007	list
(381445) 2008 QN_{33}	30 August 2008	list
382900 Rendelmann	6 September 2004	list
(383860) 2008 QB_{4}	24 August 2008	list
(384277) 2009 QR_{5}	17 August 2009	list
(386032) 2007 EH_{27}	12 March 2007	list
(388629) 2007 TL_{69}	14 October 2007	list
(388630) 2007 TH_{73}	14 October 2007	list
(388813) 2008 CF_{1}	3 February 2008	list
(391546) 2007 TL_{7}	7 October 2007	list
(394484) 2007 TK_{69}	14 October 2007	list
(394800) 2008 RL_{26}	8 September 2008	list
(397456) 2007 GE_{6}	14 April 2007	list

important;
(397741) 2008 FT_{5}	28 March 2008	list
(406399) 2007 TG_{73}	14 October 2007	list
(406613) 2008 CW_{70}	10 February 2008	list
(417587) 2006 VF_{45}	9 November 2006	list
(424102) 2007 EB_{27}	11 March 2007	list
(424204) 2007 PP_{27}	14 August 2007	list
(424259) 2007 SY_{1}	19 September 2007	list
(424489) 2008 DH_{28}	24 February 2008	list
(425086) 2009 SG_{19}	22 September 2009	list
(428367) 2007 RX_{132}	13 September 2007	list
(435613) 2008 SP_{83}	27 September 2008	list
(436007) 2009 GS_{2}	13 April 2009	list
(440277) 2004 RF_{164}	10 September 2004	list
(441057) 2007 PX_{10}	12 August 2007	list
(444617) 2006 VG_{45}	9 November 2006	list
(444916) 2008 AB_{30}	8 January 2008	list
(447955) 2008 BT_{14}	28 January 2008	list
(447956) 2008 BB_{19}	28 January 2008	list
(450760) 2007 PJ_{1}	5 August 2007	list
(456144) 2006 EQ_{2}	1 March 2006	list
(467518) 2007 GC_{2}	10 April 2007	list
(476600) 2008 SQ_{83}	27 September 2008	list
(481979) 2009 GX_{1}	12 April 2009	list
(489509) 2007 PH_{1}	5 August 2007	list

important;
(490386) 2009 PX_{2}	15 August 2009	list
(495965) 2007 RW_{132}	13 September 2007	list
(498420) 2008 AZ_{29}	8 January 2008	list
(498463) 2008 CJ_{21}	7 February 2008	list
(499137) 2009 QX_{36}	30 September 2009	list
(504446) 2008 CC_{75}	10 February 2008	list
(504706) 2009 SD_{19}	22 September 2009	list
