= List of minor planets: 498001–499000 =

The following is a partial list of minor planets, running from minor-planet number 498001 through 499000, inclusive. The primary data for this and other partial lists is based on JPL's "Small-Body Orbital Elements" and data available from the Minor Planet Center. Critical list information is also provided by the MPC, unless otherwise specified from Lowell Observatory. A detailed description of the table's columns and additional sources are given on the main page including a complete list of every page in this series, and a statistical break-up on the dynamical classification of minor planets.

Also see the summary list of all named bodies in numerical and alphabetical order, and the corresponding naming citations for the number range of this particular list. New namings may only be added to this list after official publication, as the preannouncement of names is condemned by the Working Group for Small Bodies Nomenclature of the International Astronomical Union.

Near-Earth obj.	MBA (inner)	MBA (outer)	Centaur
Mars-crosser	MBA (middle)	Jupiter trojan	Trans-Neptunian obj.
Unclassified

== 498001–498100 ==
Designation			Discovery			Properties		Ref
Permanent	Provisional	Named after	Date	Site	Discoverer(s)	Category	Diam.	Ref
498001	2007 EY_{59}	—	March 9, 2007	Kitt Peak	Spacewatch	·	1.8 km	MPC · JPL
498002	2007 EA_{67}	—	March 10, 2007	Kitt Peak	Spacewatch	·	1.2 km	MPC · JPL
498003	2007 EK_{84}	—	March 12, 2007	Mount Lemmon	Mount Lemmon Survey	·	850 m	MPC · JPL
498004	2007 EP_{84}	—	March 12, 2007	Mount Lemmon	Mount Lemmon Survey	·	1.2 km	MPC · JPL
498005	2007 ET_{99}	—	March 11, 2007	Kitt Peak	Spacewatch	·	1.6 km	MPC · JPL
498006	2007 EZ_{102}	—	January 28, 2007	Mount Lemmon	Mount Lemmon Survey	EUN	1.0 km	MPC · JPL
498007	2007 EC_{114}	—	March 12, 2007	Mount Lemmon	Mount Lemmon Survey	·	800 m	MPC · JPL
498008	2007 ER_{117}	—	March 13, 2007	Mount Lemmon	Mount Lemmon Survey	·	1.5 km	MPC · JPL
498009	2007 EU_{121}	—	January 28, 2007	Mount Lemmon	Mount Lemmon Survey	·	970 m	MPC · JPL
498010	2007 EK_{138}	—	January 28, 2007	Mount Lemmon	Mount Lemmon Survey	·	1.8 km	MPC · JPL
498011	2007 EM_{140}	—	February 22, 2007	Kitt Peak	Spacewatch	·	1.5 km	MPC · JPL
498012	2007 EF_{147}	—	March 12, 2007	Mount Lemmon	Mount Lemmon Survey	·	1.2 km	MPC · JPL
498013	2007 EJ_{153}	—	February 26, 2007	Mount Lemmon	Mount Lemmon Survey	·	2.1 km	MPC · JPL
498014	2007 EC_{191}	—	February 26, 2007	Mount Lemmon	Mount Lemmon Survey	HNS	1.1 km	MPC · JPL
498015	2007 EU_{193}	—	March 14, 2007	Kitt Peak	Spacewatch	·	1.0 km	MPC · JPL
498016	2007 EX_{197}	—	March 15, 2007	Kitt Peak	Spacewatch	HNS	1.0 km	MPC · JPL
498017	2007 EE_{217}	—	March 10, 2007	Kitt Peak	Spacewatch	HNS	1.0 km	MPC · JPL
498018	2007 FQ_{4}	—	February 17, 2007	Kitt Peak	Spacewatch	ADE	1.7 km	MPC · JPL
498019	2007 FY_{5}	—	February 26, 2007	Mount Lemmon	Mount Lemmon Survey	·	1.6 km	MPC · JPL
498020	2007 FA_{17}	—	March 9, 2007	Mount Lemmon	Mount Lemmon Survey	·	1.1 km	MPC · JPL
498021	2007 FS_{19}	—	March 10, 2007	Mount Lemmon	Mount Lemmon Survey	·	1.5 km	MPC · JPL
498022	2007 FS_{24}	—	February 21, 2007	Mount Lemmon	Mount Lemmon Survey	·	1.3 km	MPC · JPL
498023	2007 FK_{43}	—	February 22, 2007	Siding Spring	SSS	·	1.5 km	MPC · JPL
498024	2007 GD_{4}	—	April 11, 2007	Catalina	CSS	·	1.8 km	MPC · JPL
498025	2007 GF_{5}	—	March 9, 2007	Kitt Peak	Spacewatch	·	1.6 km	MPC · JPL
498026	2007 GU_{8}	—	April 7, 2007	Mount Lemmon	Mount Lemmon Survey	·	1.8 km	MPC · JPL
498027	2007 GP_{18}	—	April 11, 2007	Kitt Peak	Spacewatch	·	1.6 km	MPC · JPL
498028	2007 GH_{31}	—	April 14, 2007	Mount Lemmon	Mount Lemmon Survey	·	1.9 km	MPC · JPL
498029	2007 GT_{34}	—	March 9, 2007	Mount Lemmon	Mount Lemmon Survey	EUN	1.1 km	MPC · JPL
498030	2007 GV_{47}	—	April 14, 2007	Kitt Peak	Spacewatch	·	1.9 km	MPC · JPL
498031	2007 GP_{60}	—	April 15, 2007	Kitt Peak	Spacewatch	·	1.5 km	MPC · JPL
498032	2007 HM_{5}	—	March 14, 2007	Mount Lemmon	Mount Lemmon Survey	·	1.1 km	MPC · JPL
498033	2007 HF_{25}	—	April 18, 2007	Kitt Peak	Spacewatch	·	1.6 km	MPC · JPL
498034	2007 HK_{34}	—	April 19, 2007	Kitt Peak	Spacewatch	·	1.6 km	MPC · JPL
498035	2007 HR_{40}	—	April 20, 2007	Kitt Peak	Spacewatch	·	2.2 km	MPC · JPL
498036	2007 HF_{59}	—	March 13, 2007	Mount Lemmon	Mount Lemmon Survey	AEO	960 m	MPC · JPL
498037	2007 HY_{61}	—	March 13, 2007	Kitt Peak	Spacewatch	·	1.4 km	MPC · JPL
498038	2007 HG_{83}	—	April 23, 2007	Kitt Peak	Spacewatch	·	1.8 km	MPC · JPL
498039	2007 HD_{95}	—	April 19, 2007	Mount Lemmon	Mount Lemmon Survey	·	1.9 km	MPC · JPL
498040	2007 JN_{14}	—	April 19, 2007	Kitt Peak	Spacewatch	·	1.8 km	MPC · JPL
498041	2007 JG_{38}	—	April 22, 2007	Kitt Peak	Spacewatch	(13314)	1.4 km	MPC · JPL
498042	2007 JM_{40}	—	May 12, 2007	Kitt Peak	Spacewatch	H	480 m	MPC · JPL
498043	2007 LV_{15}	—	June 10, 2007	Kitt Peak	Spacewatch	·	1.5 km	MPC · JPL
498044	2007 LY_{19}	—	June 9, 2007	Kitt Peak	Spacewatch	·	1.7 km	MPC · JPL
498045	2007 OC_{11}	—	July 18, 2007	Mount Lemmon	Mount Lemmon Survey	·	530 m	MPC · JPL
498046	2007 PT_{27}	—	August 12, 2007	San Marcello	San Marcello	·	690 m	MPC · JPL
498047	2007 PR_{30}	—	August 13, 2007	Anderson Mesa	LONEOS	·	620 m	MPC · JPL
498048	2007 QX_{10}	—	August 23, 2007	Kitt Peak	Spacewatch	·	480 m	MPC · JPL
498049	2007 RW_{42}	—	September 9, 2007	Kitt Peak	Spacewatch	·	540 m	MPC · JPL
498050	2007 RV_{43}	—	September 9, 2007	Kitt Peak	Spacewatch	EOS	1.7 km	MPC · JPL
498051	2007 RH_{45}	—	September 9, 2007	Kitt Peak	Spacewatch	EOS	2.0 km	MPC · JPL
498052	2007 RO_{45}	—	September 9, 2007	Kitt Peak	Spacewatch	·	1.5 km	MPC · JPL
498053	2007 RF_{46}	—	April 2, 2005	Mount Lemmon	Mount Lemmon Survey	EOS	1.7 km	MPC · JPL
498054	2007 RF_{48}	—	September 9, 2007	Mount Lemmon	Mount Lemmon Survey	·	1.6 km	MPC · JPL
498055	2007 RH_{51}	—	September 9, 2007	Kitt Peak	Spacewatch	·	700 m	MPC · JPL
498056	2007 RT_{53}	—	September 9, 2007	Kitt Peak	Spacewatch	·	2.6 km	MPC · JPL
498057	2007 RT_{57}	—	September 9, 2007	Mount Lemmon	Mount Lemmon Survey	(1338) (FLO)	540 m	MPC · JPL
498058	2007 RM_{61}	—	September 10, 2007	Mount Lemmon	Mount Lemmon Survey	·	1.2 km	MPC · JPL
498059	2007 RA_{70}	—	September 10, 2007	Kitt Peak	Spacewatch	·	600 m	MPC · JPL
498060	2007 RO_{97}	—	September 10, 2007	Kitt Peak	Spacewatch	·	510 m	MPC · JPL
498061	2007 RV_{97}	—	April 2, 2005	Mount Lemmon	Mount Lemmon Survey	EMA	3.0 km	MPC · JPL
498062	2007 RU_{104}	—	August 21, 2007	Anderson Mesa	LONEOS	·	670 m	MPC · JPL
498063	2007 RB_{109}	—	September 11, 2007	Kitt Peak	Spacewatch	·	610 m	MPC · JPL
498064	2007 RJ_{109}	—	September 11, 2007	Kitt Peak	Spacewatch	·	700 m	MPC · JPL
498065	2007 RF_{133}	—	September 10, 2007	Kitt Peak	Spacewatch	·	650 m	MPC · JPL
498066	2007 RM_{133}	—	September 14, 2007	Catalina	CSS	AMO	590 m	MPC · JPL
498067	2007 RC_{134}	—	September 11, 2007	Purple Mountain	PMO NEO Survey Program	·	680 m	MPC · JPL
498068	2007 RT_{146}	—	September 15, 2007	Mount Lemmon	Mount Lemmon Survey	AMO · APO	580 m	MPC · JPL
498069	2007 RK_{152}	—	September 10, 2007	Kitt Peak	Spacewatch	·	540 m	MPC · JPL
498070	2007 RG_{160}	—	September 12, 2007	Mount Lemmon	Mount Lemmon Survey	·	1.8 km	MPC · JPL
498071	2007 RJ_{160}	—	September 12, 2007	Mount Lemmon	Mount Lemmon Survey	·	1.5 km	MPC · JPL
498072	2007 RX_{167}	—	September 10, 2007	Kitt Peak	Spacewatch	EOS	1.8 km	MPC · JPL
498073	2007 RG_{168}	—	September 10, 2007	Kitt Peak	Spacewatch	·	580 m	MPC · JPL
498074	2007 RH_{169}	—	September 10, 2007	Kitt Peak	Spacewatch	·	750 m	MPC · JPL
498075	2007 RB_{172}	—	September 10, 2007	Kitt Peak	Spacewatch	·	2.1 km	MPC · JPL
498076	2007 RY_{181}	—	September 11, 2007	Mount Lemmon	Mount Lemmon Survey	·	2.1 km	MPC · JPL
498077	2007 RO_{189}	—	September 10, 2007	Kitt Peak	Spacewatch	·	500 m	MPC · JPL
498078	2007 RK_{194}	—	September 12, 2007	Kitt Peak	Spacewatch	BAP	690 m	MPC · JPL
498079	2007 RJ_{203}	—	September 13, 2007	Kitt Peak	Spacewatch	·	1.6 km	MPC · JPL
498080	2007 RH_{206}	—	September 10, 2007	Kitt Peak	Spacewatch	KOR	1.3 km	MPC · JPL
498081	2007 RY_{207}	—	September 10, 2007	Kitt Peak	Spacewatch	·	490 m	MPC · JPL
498082	2007 RQ_{208}	—	September 10, 2007	Kitt Peak	Spacewatch	·	520 m	MPC · JPL
498083	2007 RN_{213}	—	September 12, 2007	Mount Lemmon	Mount Lemmon Survey	·	1.5 km	MPC · JPL
498084	2007 RM_{215}	—	September 12, 2007	Kitt Peak	Spacewatch	·	1.4 km	MPC · JPL
498085	2007 RF_{221}	—	September 14, 2007	Mount Lemmon	Mount Lemmon Survey	·	640 m	MPC · JPL
498086	2007 RA_{225}	—	September 10, 2007	Kitt Peak	Spacewatch	·	1.7 km	MPC · JPL
498087	2007 RD_{227}	—	September 10, 2007	Kitt Peak	Spacewatch	·	590 m	MPC · JPL
498088	2007 RK_{237}	—	September 10, 2007	Kitt Peak	Spacewatch	·	1.4 km	MPC · JPL
498089	2007 RV_{244}	—	September 10, 2007	Kitt Peak	Spacewatch	·	1.6 km	MPC · JPL
498090	2007 RO_{245}	—	September 11, 2007	Kitt Peak	Spacewatch	·	680 m	MPC · JPL
498091	2007 RG_{257}	—	September 14, 2007	Catalina	CSS	·	710 m	MPC · JPL
498092	2007 RH_{260}	—	September 14, 2007	Mount Lemmon	Mount Lemmon Survey	H	420 m	MPC · JPL
498093	2007 RT_{260}	—	September 10, 2007	Kitt Peak	Spacewatch	·	2.1 km	MPC · JPL
498094	2007 RC_{265}	—	July 18, 2007	Mount Lemmon	Mount Lemmon Survey	·	530 m	MPC · JPL
498095	2007 RE_{270}	—	September 15, 2007	Mount Lemmon	Mount Lemmon Survey	·	2.2 km	MPC · JPL
498096	2007 RY_{272}	—	September 15, 2007	Kitt Peak	Spacewatch	·	1.5 km	MPC · JPL
498097	2007 RS_{280}	—	September 13, 2007	Catalina	CSS	·	2.2 km	MPC · JPL
498098	2007 RC_{292}	—	September 12, 2007	Mount Lemmon	Mount Lemmon Survey	·	1.5 km	MPC · JPL
498099	2007 RP_{292}	—	September 12, 2007	Mount Lemmon	Mount Lemmon Survey	KOR	1.2 km	MPC · JPL
498100	2007 RT_{292}	—	September 12, 2007	Mount Lemmon	Mount Lemmon Survey	·	1.3 km	MPC · JPL

== 498101–498200 ==
back to top

Designation			Discovery			Properties		Ref
Permanent	Provisional	Named after	Date	Site	Discoverer(s)	Category	Diam.	Ref
498101	2007 RW_{292}	—	September 12, 2007	Mount Lemmon	Mount Lemmon Survey	·	2.0 km	MPC · JPL
498102	2007 RL_{294}	—	September 13, 2007	Mount Lemmon	Mount Lemmon Survey	·	1.5 km	MPC · JPL
498103	2007 RG_{295}	—	September 14, 2007	Mount Lemmon	Mount Lemmon Survey	·	1.6 km	MPC · JPL
498104	2007 RV_{296}	—	September 14, 2007	Mount Lemmon	Mount Lemmon Survey	·	1.4 km	MPC · JPL
498105	2007 RB_{297}	—	September 10, 2007	Mount Lemmon	Mount Lemmon Survey	·	2.7 km	MPC · JPL
498106	2007 RG_{297}	—	September 10, 2007	Kitt Peak	Spacewatch	·	570 m	MPC · JPL
498107	2007 RP_{308}	—	September 13, 2007	Mount Lemmon	Mount Lemmon Survey	·	2.0 km	MPC · JPL
498108	2007 RN_{317}	—	May 26, 2006	Kitt Peak	Spacewatch	·	700 m	MPC · JPL
498109	2007 RW_{317}	—	September 10, 2007	Catalina	CSS	·	570 m	MPC · JPL
498110	2007 RO_{320}	—	September 13, 2007	Mount Lemmon	Mount Lemmon Survey	EOS	1.7 km	MPC · JPL
498111	2007 RX_{321}	—	September 9, 2007	Mount Lemmon	Mount Lemmon Survey	·	2.2 km	MPC · JPL
498112	2007 RO_{323}	—	September 9, 2007	Mount Lemmon	Mount Lemmon Survey	·	520 m	MPC · JPL
498113	2007 RD_{324}	—	September 14, 2007	Mount Lemmon	Mount Lemmon Survey	·	1.2 km	MPC · JPL
498114	2007 RN_{325}	—	September 15, 2007	Mount Lemmon	Mount Lemmon Survey	·	1.7 km	MPC · JPL
498115	2007 RR_{325}	—	September 14, 2007	Mount Lemmon	Mount Lemmon Survey	·	1.7 km	MPC · JPL
498116	2007 SD_{3}	—	September 8, 2007	Anderson Mesa	LONEOS	·	800 m	MPC · JPL
498117	2007 SX_{3}	—	September 16, 2007	Socorro	LINEAR	·	2.2 km	MPC · JPL
498118	2007 SH_{8}	—	September 18, 2007	Kitt Peak	Spacewatch	·	1.9 km	MPC · JPL
498119	2007 SF_{9}	—	September 10, 2007	Kitt Peak	Spacewatch	·	530 m	MPC · JPL
498120	2007 SF_{13}	—	September 19, 2007	Kitt Peak	Spacewatch	·	720 m	MPC · JPL
498121	2007 SA_{17}	—	September 30, 2007	Kitt Peak	Spacewatch	·	1.4 km	MPC · JPL
498122	2007 SZ_{19}	—	September 18, 2007	Mount Lemmon	Mount Lemmon Survey	·	1.8 km	MPC · JPL
498123	2007 SD_{23}	—	September 25, 2007	Mount Lemmon	Mount Lemmon Survey	(2076)	540 m	MPC · JPL
498124	2007 TP_{6}	—	October 6, 2007	Dauban	Chante-Perdrix	·	2.8 km	MPC · JPL
498125	2007 TG_{15}	—	October 8, 2007	Catalina	CSS	AMO	430 m	MPC · JPL
498126	2007 TG_{19}	—	September 13, 2007	Mount Lemmon	Mount Lemmon Survey	·	580 m	MPC · JPL
498127	2007 TE_{26}	—	October 4, 2007	Mount Lemmon	Mount Lemmon Survey	·	1.3 km	MPC · JPL
498128	2007 TX_{26}	—	October 4, 2007	Kitt Peak	Spacewatch	·	620 m	MPC · JPL
498129	2007 TY_{26}	—	September 14, 2007	Mount Lemmon	Mount Lemmon Survey	·	1.7 km	MPC · JPL
498130	2007 TA_{28}	—	October 4, 2007	Kitt Peak	Spacewatch	EOS	1.8 km	MPC · JPL
498131	2007 TQ_{33}	—	October 6, 2007	Kitt Peak	Spacewatch	·	1.8 km	MPC · JPL
498132	2007 TD_{39}	—	October 6, 2007	Kitt Peak	Spacewatch	·	1.7 km	MPC · JPL
498133	2007 TU_{39}	—	October 6, 2007	Kitt Peak	Spacewatch	·	1.3 km	MPC · JPL
498134	2007 TJ_{41}	—	October 6, 2007	Kitt Peak	Spacewatch	EOS	1.8 km	MPC · JPL
498135	2007 TZ_{42}	—	April 2, 2005	Mount Lemmon	Mount Lemmon Survey	·	1.5 km	MPC · JPL
498136	2007 TT_{44}	—	September 14, 2007	Mount Lemmon	Mount Lemmon Survey	BAP	620 m	MPC · JPL
498137	2007 TU_{46}	—	October 4, 2007	Kitt Peak	Spacewatch	·	2.1 km	MPC · JPL
498138	2007 TS_{51}	—	September 8, 2007	Mount Lemmon	Mount Lemmon Survey	·	1.5 km	MPC · JPL
498139	2007 TO_{54}	—	October 4, 2007	Kitt Peak	Spacewatch	·	1.5 km	MPC · JPL
498140	2007 TN_{56}	—	October 4, 2007	Kitt Peak	Spacewatch	·	590 m	MPC · JPL
498141	2007 TL_{58}	—	October 4, 2007	Kitt Peak	Spacewatch	·	1.5 km	MPC · JPL
498142	2007 TX_{61}	—	October 7, 2007	Mount Lemmon	Mount Lemmon Survey	·	1.5 km	MPC · JPL
498143	2007 TR_{65}	—	October 12, 2007	Catalina	CSS	APO +1km	1.5 km	MPC · JPL
498144	2007 TR_{73}	—	September 15, 2007	Catalina	CSS	·	790 m	MPC · JPL
498145	2007 TS_{80}	—	October 7, 2007	Mount Lemmon	Mount Lemmon Survey	·	2.3 km	MPC · JPL
498146	2007 TJ_{87}	—	October 8, 2007	Mount Lemmon	Mount Lemmon Survey	·	1.6 km	MPC · JPL
498147	2007 TD_{96}	—	September 9, 2007	Mount Lemmon	Mount Lemmon Survey	·	1.2 km	MPC · JPL
498148	2007 TZ_{99}	—	September 10, 2007	Mount Lemmon	Mount Lemmon Survey	·	2.2 km	MPC · JPL
498149	2007 TB_{102}	—	October 8, 2007	Mount Lemmon	Mount Lemmon Survey	·	1.9 km	MPC · JPL
498150	2007 TN_{102}	—	October 8, 2007	Mount Lemmon	Mount Lemmon Survey	·	550 m	MPC · JPL
498151	2007 TO_{109}	—	October 7, 2007	Catalina	CSS	·	610 m	MPC · JPL
498152	2007 TK_{111}	—	October 8, 2007	Catalina	CSS	·	760 m	MPC · JPL
498153	2007 TT_{112}	—	September 12, 2007	Mount Lemmon	Mount Lemmon Survey	EOS	1.6 km	MPC · JPL
498154	2007 TY_{113}	—	October 8, 2007	Catalina	CSS	EOS	1.8 km	MPC · JPL
498155	2007 TX_{114}	—	October 8, 2007	Kitt Peak	Spacewatch	TEL	1.3 km	MPC · JPL
498156	2007 TU_{116}	—	September 20, 2007	Catalina	CSS	·	2.2 km	MPC · JPL
498157	2007 TK_{123}	—	October 6, 2007	Kitt Peak	Spacewatch	·	2.2 km	MPC · JPL
498158	2007 TC_{128}	—	October 6, 2007	Kitt Peak	Spacewatch	·	690 m	MPC · JPL
498159	2007 TZ_{131}	—	October 7, 2007	Mount Lemmon	Mount Lemmon Survey	·	420 m	MPC · JPL
498160	2007 TL_{132}	—	October 7, 2007	Mount Lemmon	Mount Lemmon Survey	·	1.4 km	MPC · JPL
498161	2007 TA_{135}	—	October 8, 2007	Kitt Peak	Spacewatch	·	1.6 km	MPC · JPL
498162	2007 TK_{135}	—	September 12, 2007	Mount Lemmon	Mount Lemmon Survey	EOS	1.6 km	MPC · JPL
498163	2007 TV_{152}	—	September 24, 2007	Kitt Peak	Spacewatch	·	1.5 km	MPC · JPL
498164	2007 TN_{167}	—	October 11, 2007	Mount Lemmon	Mount Lemmon Survey	·	570 m	MPC · JPL
498165	2007 TB_{168}	—	October 11, 2007	Catalina	CSS	·	1.7 km	MPC · JPL
498166	2007 TU_{177}	—	October 6, 2007	Kitt Peak	Spacewatch	·	2.5 km	MPC · JPL
498167	2007 TZ_{177}	—	October 6, 2007	Kitt Peak	Spacewatch	·	1.4 km	MPC · JPL
498168	2007 TY_{179}	—	September 13, 2007	Mount Lemmon	Mount Lemmon Survey	·	1.6 km	MPC · JPL
498169	2007 TG_{182}	—	September 20, 2007	Catalina	CSS	·	2.1 km	MPC · JPL
498170	2007 TV_{194}	—	October 7, 2007	Mount Lemmon	Mount Lemmon Survey	·	460 m	MPC · JPL
498171	2007 TC_{199}	—	October 8, 2007	Kitt Peak	Spacewatch	·	2.3 km	MPC · JPL
498172	2007 TK_{199}	—	October 8, 2007	Kitt Peak	Spacewatch	·	520 m	MPC · JPL
498173	2007 TX_{200}	—	October 8, 2007	Kitt Peak	Spacewatch	·	1.4 km	MPC · JPL
498174	2007 TY_{209}	—	October 11, 2007	Mount Lemmon	Mount Lemmon Survey	·	2.6 km	MPC · JPL
498175	2007 TZ_{209}	—	October 11, 2007	Mount Lemmon	Mount Lemmon Survey	·	1.9 km	MPC · JPL
498176	2007 TK_{211}	—	October 7, 2007	Kitt Peak	Spacewatch	EOS	1.8 km	MPC · JPL
498177	2007 TJ_{212}	—	September 25, 2007	Mount Lemmon	Mount Lemmon Survey	·	2.2 km	MPC · JPL
498178	2007 TN_{215}	—	October 7, 2007	Kitt Peak	Spacewatch	·	2.5 km	MPC · JPL
498179	2007 TO_{220}	—	October 8, 2007	Catalina	CSS	·	550 m	MPC · JPL
498180	2007 TV_{231}	—	October 8, 2007	Kitt Peak	Spacewatch	EOS	1.5 km	MPC · JPL
498181	2007 TE_{232}	—	October 8, 2007	Kitt Peak	Spacewatch	·	1.5 km	MPC · JPL
498182	2007 TU_{235}	—	October 9, 2007	Mount Lemmon	Mount Lemmon Survey	·	1.3 km	MPC · JPL
498183	2007 TN_{255}	—	October 10, 2007	Kitt Peak	Spacewatch	·	700 m	MPC · JPL
498184	2007 TP_{260}	—	October 10, 2007	Kitt Peak	Spacewatch	PHO	670 m	MPC · JPL
498185	2007 TW_{271}	—	October 9, 2007	Kitt Peak	Spacewatch	EOS	1.9 km	MPC · JPL
498186	2007 TU_{283}	—	October 8, 2007	Mount Lemmon	Mount Lemmon Survey	·	1.4 km	MPC · JPL
498187	2007 TP_{295}	—	October 4, 2007	Kitt Peak	Spacewatch	·	1.7 km	MPC · JPL
498188	2007 TV_{295}	—	September 9, 2007	Mount Lemmon	Mount Lemmon Survey	·	2.5 km	MPC · JPL
498189	2007 TN_{306}	—	October 8, 2007	Kitt Peak	Spacewatch	·	1.7 km	MPC · JPL
498190	2007 TS_{316}	—	October 12, 2007	Kitt Peak	Spacewatch	KOR	1.2 km	MPC · JPL
498191	2007 TA_{319}	—	October 12, 2007	Kitt Peak	Spacewatch	·	2.4 km	MPC · JPL
498192	2007 TJ_{319}	—	September 14, 2007	Mount Lemmon	Mount Lemmon Survey	(2076)	830 m	MPC · JPL
498193	2007 TO_{322}	—	October 11, 2007	Kitt Peak	Spacewatch	EOS	1.6 km	MPC · JPL
498194	2007 TH_{327}	—	October 11, 2007	Kitt Peak	Spacewatch	·	2.4 km	MPC · JPL
498195	2007 TP_{328}	—	October 11, 2007	Kitt Peak	Spacewatch	EOS	1.6 km	MPC · JPL
498196	2007 TZ_{328}	—	October 11, 2007	Kitt Peak	Spacewatch	TEL	1.5 km	MPC · JPL
498197	2007 TN_{334}	—	September 18, 2007	Mount Lemmon	Mount Lemmon Survey	·	2.2 km	MPC · JPL
498198	2007 TH_{338}	—	October 13, 2007	Catalina	CSS	·	630 m	MPC · JPL
498199	2007 TZ_{342}	—	October 10, 2007	Mount Lemmon	Mount Lemmon Survey	·	2.0 km	MPC · JPL
498200	2007 TM_{362}	—	October 15, 2007	Mount Lemmon	Mount Lemmon Survey	·	2.6 km	MPC · JPL

== 498201–498300 ==
back to top

Designation			Discovery			Properties		Ref
Permanent	Provisional	Named after	Date	Site	Discoverer(s)	Category	Diam.	Ref
498201	2007 TH_{377}	—	October 11, 2007	Mount Lemmon	Mount Lemmon Survey	·	2.1 km	MPC · JPL
498202	2007 TF_{378}	—	October 12, 2007	Kitt Peak	Spacewatch	EOS	1.2 km	MPC · JPL
498203	2007 TJ_{382}	—	October 14, 2007	Kitt Peak	Spacewatch	·	1.6 km	MPC · JPL
498204	2007 TU_{383}	—	October 6, 2007	Kitt Peak	Spacewatch	·	2.8 km	MPC · JPL
498205	2007 TV_{391}	—	October 15, 2007	Catalina	CSS	·	2.3 km	MPC · JPL
498206	2007 TH_{404}	—	October 7, 2007	Kitt Peak	Spacewatch	·	2.1 km	MPC · JPL
498207	2007 TG_{405}	—	October 11, 2007	Kitt Peak	Spacewatch	·	640 m	MPC · JPL
498208	2007 TJ_{408}	—	October 15, 2007	Mount Lemmon	Mount Lemmon Survey	·	2.1 km	MPC · JPL
498209	2007 TU_{412}	—	September 12, 2007	Catalina	CSS	·	600 m	MPC · JPL
498210	2007 TY_{428}	—	October 12, 2007	Kitt Peak	Spacewatch	·	1.6 km	MPC · JPL
498211	2007 TP_{433}	—	October 7, 2007	Anderson Mesa	LONEOS	·	680 m	MPC · JPL
498212	2007 TV_{433}	—	October 12, 2007	Kitt Peak	Spacewatch	EOS	1.8 km	MPC · JPL
498213	2007 TW_{433}	—	October 13, 2007	Kitt Peak	Spacewatch	·	2.0 km	MPC · JPL
498214	2007 TZ_{437}	—	October 4, 2007	Kitt Peak	Spacewatch	·	810 m	MPC · JPL
498215	2007 TP_{438}	—	October 10, 2007	Kitt Peak	Spacewatch	·	2.0 km	MPC · JPL
498216	2007 TV_{439}	—	October 9, 2007	Mount Lemmon	Mount Lemmon Survey	·	1.8 km	MPC · JPL
498217	2007 TP_{440}	—	October 8, 2007	Mount Lemmon	Mount Lemmon Survey	·	1.4 km	MPC · JPL
498218	2007 TZ_{442}	—	October 10, 2007	Mount Lemmon	Mount Lemmon Survey	·	2.7 km	MPC · JPL
498219	2007 TS_{445}	—	October 7, 2007	Mount Lemmon	Mount Lemmon Survey	·	1.7 km	MPC · JPL
498220	2007 TL_{447}	—	October 12, 2007	Mount Lemmon	Mount Lemmon Survey	EOS	2.0 km	MPC · JPL
498221	2007 TG_{448}	—	October 7, 2007	Mount Lemmon	Mount Lemmon Survey	THM	1.7 km	MPC · JPL
498222	2007 TM_{449}	—	October 10, 2007	Kitt Peak	Spacewatch	·	2.7 km	MPC · JPL
498223	2007 TY_{449}	—	October 10, 2007	Kitt Peak	Spacewatch	·	2.6 km	MPC · JPL
498224	2007 TM_{451}	—	October 15, 2007	Socorro	LINEAR	·	3.4 km	MPC · JPL
498225	2007 UH_{5}	—	September 13, 2007	Mount Lemmon	Mount Lemmon Survey	H	480 m	MPC · JPL
498226	2007 UM_{13}	—	October 16, 2007	Mount Lemmon	Mount Lemmon Survey	·	550 m	MPC · JPL
498227	2007 UK_{15}	—	September 9, 2007	Mount Lemmon	Mount Lemmon Survey	VER	2.0 km	MPC · JPL
498228	2007 UH_{19}	—	October 7, 2007	Mount Lemmon	Mount Lemmon Survey	·	1.9 km	MPC · JPL
498229	2007 UX_{21}	—	October 12, 2007	Kitt Peak	Spacewatch	·	2.1 km	MPC · JPL
498230	2007 UL_{24}	—	October 8, 2007	Mount Lemmon	Mount Lemmon Survey	·	550 m	MPC · JPL
498231	2007 UZ_{27}	—	September 10, 2007	Kitt Peak	Spacewatch	·	530 m	MPC · JPL
498232	2007 UY_{41}	—	October 16, 2007	Mount Lemmon	Mount Lemmon Survey	·	1.0 km	MPC · JPL
498233	2007 UJ_{52}	—	October 24, 2007	Mount Lemmon	Mount Lemmon Survey	·	850 m	MPC · JPL
498234	2007 UA_{53}	—	October 12, 2007	Kitt Peak	Spacewatch	·	1.5 km	MPC · JPL
498235	2007 UD_{53}	—	October 12, 2007	Kitt Peak	Spacewatch	·	500 m	MPC · JPL
498236	2007 UM_{54}	—	October 11, 2007	Kitt Peak	Spacewatch	·	2.2 km	MPC · JPL
498237	2007 US_{55}	—	October 10, 2007	Kitt Peak	Spacewatch	·	1.7 km	MPC · JPL
498238	2007 UP_{57}	—	October 7, 2007	Mount Lemmon	Mount Lemmon Survey	·	2.0 km	MPC · JPL
498239	2007 UJ_{59}	—	October 10, 2007	Kitt Peak	Spacewatch	·	1.7 km	MPC · JPL
498240	2007 UZ_{69}	—	October 30, 2007	Mount Lemmon	Mount Lemmon Survey	·	440 m	MPC · JPL
498241	2007 UY_{72}	—	October 9, 2007	Kitt Peak	Spacewatch	·	1.5 km	MPC · JPL
498242	2007 UU_{73}	—	October 7, 2007	Mount Lemmon	Mount Lemmon Survey	·	1.9 km	MPC · JPL
498243	2007 UQ_{79}	—	October 30, 2007	Mount Lemmon	Mount Lemmon Survey	V	380 m	MPC · JPL
498244	2007 UH_{84}	—	September 18, 2007	Mount Lemmon	Mount Lemmon Survey	·	600 m	MPC · JPL
498245	2007 US_{88}	—	October 12, 2007	Kitt Peak	Spacewatch	·	2.8 km	MPC · JPL
498246	2007 UF_{90}	—	October 30, 2007	Mount Lemmon	Mount Lemmon Survey	THM	1.7 km	MPC · JPL
498247	2007 UB_{93}	—	October 12, 2007	Kitt Peak	Spacewatch	·	1.6 km	MPC · JPL
498248	2007 UA_{96}	—	October 30, 2007	Mount Lemmon	Mount Lemmon Survey	·	570 m	MPC · JPL
498249	2007 UO_{97}	—	October 30, 2007	Mount Lemmon	Mount Lemmon Survey	EOS	1.4 km	MPC · JPL
498250	2007 UW_{98}	—	October 17, 2007	Mount Lemmon	Mount Lemmon Survey	·	2.2 km	MPC · JPL
498251	2007 UJ_{99}	—	October 30, 2007	Kitt Peak	Spacewatch	·	710 m	MPC · JPL
498252	2007 UC_{100}	—	October 30, 2007	Kitt Peak	Spacewatch	·	1.4 km	MPC · JPL
498253	2007 UR_{102}	—	October 11, 2007	Kitt Peak	Spacewatch	·	2.3 km	MPC · JPL
498254	2007 UB_{113}	—	October 30, 2007	Catalina	CSS	·	700 m	MPC · JPL
498255	2007 UK_{113}	—	October 31, 2007	Kitt Peak	Spacewatch	·	2.5 km	MPC · JPL
498256	2007 UC_{114}	—	October 16, 2007	Mount Lemmon	Mount Lemmon Survey	·	1.5 km	MPC · JPL
498257	2007 UY_{115}	—	October 31, 2007	Kitt Peak	Spacewatch	·	540 m	MPC · JPL
498258	2007 UM_{116}	—	October 12, 2007	Kitt Peak	Spacewatch	·	1.8 km	MPC · JPL
498259	2007 UG_{117}	—	October 15, 2007	Kitt Peak	Spacewatch	EOS	1.5 km	MPC · JPL
498260	2007 UU_{122}	—	September 14, 2007	Mount Lemmon	Mount Lemmon Survey	·	1.9 km	MPC · JPL
498261	2007 UL_{124}	—	October 4, 2007	Kitt Peak	Spacewatch	EOS	1.8 km	MPC · JPL
498262	2007 US_{126}	—	September 10, 2007	Kitt Peak	Spacewatch	·	2.0 km	MPC · JPL
498263	2007 UW_{127}	—	October 24, 2007	Mount Lemmon	Mount Lemmon Survey	·	620 m	MPC · JPL
498264	2007 UF_{129}	—	October 19, 2007	Mount Lemmon	Mount Lemmon Survey	·	2.3 km	MPC · JPL
498265	2007 UG_{135}	—	September 14, 2007	Mount Lemmon	Mount Lemmon Survey	·	1.6 km	MPC · JPL
498266	2007 UK_{138}	—	October 19, 2007	Kitt Peak	Spacewatch	·	660 m	MPC · JPL
498267	2007 VF	—	October 15, 2007	Mount Lemmon	Mount Lemmon Survey	EOS	2.0 km	MPC · JPL
498268	2007 VJ_{4}	—	October 16, 2007	Catalina	CSS	·	3.0 km	MPC · JPL
498269	2007 VW_{4}	—	November 3, 2007	Gnosca	S. Sposetti	·	660 m	MPC · JPL
498270	2007 VM_{10}	—	September 26, 2007	Mount Lemmon	Mount Lemmon Survey	·	650 m	MPC · JPL
498271	2007 VO_{10}	—	September 25, 2007	Mount Lemmon	Mount Lemmon Survey	H	440 m	MPC · JPL
498272	2007 VB_{15}	—	November 1, 2007	Kitt Peak	Spacewatch	·	1.7 km	MPC · JPL
498273	2007 VO_{27}	—	November 2, 2007	Mount Lemmon	Mount Lemmon Survey	EOS	1.5 km	MPC · JPL
498274	2007 VD_{30}	—	October 11, 2007	Mount Lemmon	Mount Lemmon Survey	·	670 m	MPC · JPL
498275	2007 VT_{32}	—	October 7, 2007	Kitt Peak	Spacewatch	·	400 m	MPC · JPL
498276	2007 VT_{33}	—	October 19, 2007	Kitt Peak	Spacewatch	·	600 m	MPC · JPL
498277	2007 VS_{34}	—	November 3, 2007	Kitt Peak	Spacewatch	·	530 m	MPC · JPL
498278	2007 VC_{46}	—	November 1, 2007	Kitt Peak	Spacewatch	EOS	1.5 km	MPC · JPL
498279	2007 VH_{46}	—	November 1, 2007	Kitt Peak	Spacewatch	·	2.1 km	MPC · JPL
498280	2007 VD_{48}	—	October 9, 2007	Kitt Peak	Spacewatch	·	510 m	MPC · JPL
498281	2007 VF_{49}	—	November 1, 2007	Kitt Peak	Spacewatch	·	670 m	MPC · JPL
498282	2007 VK_{50}	—	October 9, 2007	Kitt Peak	Spacewatch	·	3.4 km	MPC · JPL
498283	2007 VQ_{50}	—	October 9, 2007	Kitt Peak	Spacewatch	EOS	1.7 km	MPC · JPL
498284	2007 VM_{58}	—	November 1, 2007	Kitt Peak	Spacewatch	·	570 m	MPC · JPL
498285	2007 VS_{60}	—	November 1, 2007	Kitt Peak	Spacewatch	·	650 m	MPC · JPL
498286	2007 VX_{62}	—	November 1, 2007	Kitt Peak	Spacewatch	·	750 m	MPC · JPL
498287	2007 VL_{66}	—	November 2, 2007	Kitt Peak	Spacewatch	·	1.9 km	MPC · JPL
498288	2007 VH_{71}	—	October 21, 2007	Catalina	CSS	H	610 m	MPC · JPL
498289	2007 VK_{75}	—	October 8, 2007	Mount Lemmon	Mount Lemmon Survey	·	580 m	MPC · JPL
498290	2007 VJ_{76}	—	October 21, 2007	Kitt Peak	Spacewatch	EOS	1.5 km	MPC · JPL
498291	2007 VY_{78}	—	November 3, 2007	Kitt Peak	Spacewatch	MAS	620 m	MPC · JPL
498292	2007 VC_{80}	—	November 3, 2007	Kitt Peak	Spacewatch	·	1.1 km	MPC · JPL
498293	2007 VO_{88}	—	November 2, 2007	Socorro	LINEAR	·	3.1 km	MPC · JPL
498294	2007 VE_{96}	—	October 12, 2007	Mount Lemmon	Mount Lemmon Survey	·	610 m	MPC · JPL
498295	2007 VS_{97}	—	November 1, 2007	Kitt Peak	Spacewatch	·	740 m	MPC · JPL
498296	2007 VR_{98}	—	October 15, 2007	Kitt Peak	Spacewatch	·	590 m	MPC · JPL
498297	2007 VH_{99}	—	November 2, 2007	Kitt Peak	Spacewatch	·	840 m	MPC · JPL
498298	2007 VE_{101}	—	November 2, 2007	Kitt Peak	Spacewatch	·	2.6 km	MPC · JPL
498299	2007 VO_{104}	—	October 14, 2007	Mount Lemmon	Mount Lemmon Survey	EOS	1.5 km	MPC · JPL
498300	2007 VW_{106}	—	November 3, 2007	Kitt Peak	Spacewatch	·	2.0 km	MPC · JPL

== 498301–498400 ==
back to top

Designation			Discovery			Properties		Ref
Permanent	Provisional	Named after	Date	Site	Discoverer(s)	Category	Diam.	Ref
498301	2007 VE_{107}	—	October 17, 2007	Mount Lemmon	Mount Lemmon Survey	VER	2.7 km	MPC · JPL
498302	2007 VS_{108}	—	November 3, 2007	Kitt Peak	Spacewatch	THM	2.0 km	MPC · JPL
498303	2007 VC_{109}	—	September 15, 2007	Mount Lemmon	Mount Lemmon Survey	·	2.2 km	MPC · JPL
498304	2007 VH_{109}	—	October 20, 2007	Mount Lemmon	Mount Lemmon Survey	·	1.4 km	MPC · JPL
498305	2007 VR_{112}	—	October 20, 2007	Mount Lemmon	Mount Lemmon Survey	·	2.3 km	MPC · JPL
498306	2007 VU_{117}	—	September 25, 2007	Mount Lemmon	Mount Lemmon Survey	V	550 m	MPC · JPL
498307	2007 VK_{118}	—	September 13, 2007	Mount Lemmon	Mount Lemmon Survey	·	560 m	MPC · JPL
498308	2007 VG_{128}	—	October 12, 2007	Kitt Peak	Spacewatch	·	1.4 km	MPC · JPL
498309	2007 VT_{131}	—	October 16, 2007	Kitt Peak	Spacewatch	·	980 m	MPC · JPL
498310	2007 VM_{138}	—	October 21, 2007	Kitt Peak	Spacewatch	·	1.9 km	MPC · JPL
498311	2007 VW_{139}	—	October 17, 2007	Mount Lemmon	Mount Lemmon Survey	·	550 m	MPC · JPL
498312	2007 VY_{143}	—	November 4, 2007	Kitt Peak	Spacewatch	V	510 m	MPC · JPL
498313	2007 VG_{146}	—	November 4, 2007	Kitt Peak	Spacewatch	·	2.6 km	MPC · JPL
498314	2007 VQ_{147}	—	November 4, 2007	Kitt Peak	Spacewatch	·	2.1 km	MPC · JPL
498315	2007 VD_{148}	—	November 4, 2007	Kitt Peak	Spacewatch	·	2.4 km	MPC · JPL
498316	2007 VH_{153}	—	October 20, 2007	Mount Lemmon	Mount Lemmon Survey	V	610 m	MPC · JPL
498317	2007 VU_{155}	—	November 5, 2007	Kitt Peak	Spacewatch	·	590 m	MPC · JPL
498318	2007 VX_{155}	—	November 5, 2007	Kitt Peak	Spacewatch	·	580 m	MPC · JPL
498319	2007 VN_{157}	—	October 20, 2007	Mount Lemmon	Mount Lemmon Survey	EOS	1.7 km	MPC · JPL
498320	2007 VX_{158}	—	November 5, 2007	Kitt Peak	Spacewatch	·	2.7 km	MPC · JPL
498321	2007 VF_{166}	—	October 15, 2007	Mount Lemmon	Mount Lemmon Survey	·	2.4 km	MPC · JPL
498322	2007 VG_{170}	—	November 6, 2007	Kitt Peak	Spacewatch	·	810 m	MPC · JPL
498323	2007 VH_{170}	—	November 6, 2007	Kitt Peak	Spacewatch	H	550 m	MPC · JPL
498324	2007 VD_{178}	—	October 4, 2007	Kitt Peak	Spacewatch	·	2.6 km	MPC · JPL
498325	2007 VC_{182}	—	October 8, 2007	Kitt Peak	Spacewatch	·	1.5 km	MPC · JPL
498326	2007 VK_{183}	—	November 8, 2007	Catalina	CSS	·	930 m	MPC · JPL
498327	2007 VX_{188}	—	October 31, 2007	Kitt Peak	Spacewatch	·	740 m	MPC · JPL
498328	2007 VT_{205}	—	October 12, 2007	Kitt Peak	Spacewatch	·	540 m	MPC · JPL
498329	2007 VW_{210}	—	November 9, 2007	Kitt Peak	Spacewatch	·	460 m	MPC · JPL
498330	2007 VB_{213}	—	November 9, 2007	Kitt Peak	Spacewatch	·	590 m	MPC · JPL
498331	2007 VS_{226}	—	October 15, 2007	Mount Lemmon	Mount Lemmon Survey	·	760 m	MPC · JPL
498332	2007 VO_{228}	—	November 12, 2007	Mount Lemmon	Mount Lemmon Survey	·	3.1 km	MPC · JPL
498333	2007 VH_{232}	—	November 7, 2007	Kitt Peak	Spacewatch	·	1.4 km	MPC · JPL
498334	2007 VE_{234}	—	November 1, 2007	Kitt Peak	Spacewatch	H	500 m	MPC · JPL
498335	2007 VD_{235}	—	November 9, 2007	Kitt Peak	Spacewatch	·	630 m	MPC · JPL
498336	2007 VZ_{235}	—	October 11, 2007	Kitt Peak	Spacewatch	·	1.5 km	MPC · JPL
498337	2007 VQ_{238}	—	November 5, 2007	Kitt Peak	Spacewatch	·	2.3 km	MPC · JPL
498338	2007 VU_{240}	—	November 9, 2007	Catalina	CSS	·	3.2 km	MPC · JPL
498339	2007 VU_{243}	—	November 1, 2007	Kitt Peak	Spacewatch	·	2.0 km	MPC · JPL
498340	2007 VW_{243}	—	November 13, 2007	Catalina	CSS	·	2.8 km	MPC · JPL
498341	2007 VY_{243}	—	September 9, 2007	Mount Lemmon	Mount Lemmon Survey	·	580 m	MPC · JPL
498342	2007 VZ_{247}	—	October 12, 2007	Mount Lemmon	Mount Lemmon Survey	·	2.2 km	MPC · JPL
498343	2007 VS_{256}	—	November 13, 2007	Mount Lemmon	Mount Lemmon Survey	·	2.4 km	MPC · JPL
498344	2007 VX_{258}	—	October 10, 2007	Catalina	CSS	·	1.1 km	MPC · JPL
498345	2007 VK_{273}	—	November 12, 2007	Catalina	CSS	·	2.7 km	MPC · JPL
498346	2007 VC_{277}	—	November 14, 2007	Kitt Peak	Spacewatch	·	2.8 km	MPC · JPL
498347	2007 VF_{279}	—	November 3, 2007	Kitt Peak	Spacewatch	·	2.3 km	MPC · JPL
498348	2007 VS_{288}	—	November 13, 2007	Anderson Mesa	LONEOS	·	530 m	MPC · JPL
498349	2007 VQ_{303}	—	October 17, 2007	Catalina	CSS	·	2.8 km	MPC · JPL
498350	2007 VZ_{303}	—	October 17, 2007	Catalina	CSS	·	2.2 km	MPC · JPL
498351	2007 VR_{305}	—	November 3, 2007	Mount Lemmon	Mount Lemmon Survey	·	3.2 km	MPC · JPL
498352	2007 VX_{306}	—	November 2, 2007	Kitt Peak	Spacewatch	·	630 m	MPC · JPL
498353	2007 VE_{307}	—	November 2, 2007	Kitt Peak	Spacewatch	·	670 m	MPC · JPL
498354	2007 VX_{308}	—	November 8, 2007	Catalina	CSS	·	1.9 km	MPC · JPL
498355	2007 VP_{309}	—	November 2, 2007	Mount Lemmon	Mount Lemmon Survey	·	2.9 km	MPC · JPL
498356	2007 VV_{311}	—	November 3, 2007	Kitt Peak	Spacewatch	·	2.8 km	MPC · JPL
498357	2007 VX_{314}	—	November 2, 2007	Kitt Peak	Spacewatch	·	2.1 km	MPC · JPL
498358	2007 VD_{315}	—	November 4, 2007	Mount Lemmon	Mount Lemmon Survey	EOS	1.7 km	MPC · JPL
498359	2007 VK_{315}	—	November 5, 2007	Kitt Peak	Spacewatch	·	4.1 km	MPC · JPL
498360	2007 VK_{316}	—	November 5, 2007	Kitt Peak	Spacewatch	·	2.8 km	MPC · JPL
498361	2007 VW_{318}	—	November 1, 2007	Kitt Peak	Spacewatch	EOS	2.2 km	MPC · JPL
498362	2007 VA_{320}	—	November 1, 2007	Kitt Peak	Spacewatch	·	1.9 km	MPC · JPL
498363	2007 VZ_{322}	—	November 2, 2007	Kitt Peak	Spacewatch	EOS	1.8 km	MPC · JPL
498364	2007 VS_{324}	—	November 8, 2007	Socorro	LINEAR	·	2.7 km	MPC · JPL
498365	2007 VT_{324}	—	November 8, 2007	Mount Lemmon	Mount Lemmon Survey	·	720 m	MPC · JPL
498366	2007 VV_{324}	—	November 8, 2007	Mount Lemmon	Mount Lemmon Survey	·	570 m	MPC · JPL
498367	2007 VC_{325}	—	November 1, 2007	Kitt Peak	Spacewatch	·	2.6 km	MPC · JPL
498368	2007 VT_{326}	—	November 4, 2007	Kitt Peak	Spacewatch	·	1.8 km	MPC · JPL
498369	2007 VW_{326}	—	November 4, 2007	Kitt Peak	Spacewatch	·	2.4 km	MPC · JPL
498370	2007 VF_{330}	—	November 3, 2007	Kitt Peak	Spacewatch	·	2.2 km	MPC · JPL
498371	2007 VH_{332}	—	November 7, 2007	Mount Lemmon	Mount Lemmon Survey	·	2.9 km	MPC · JPL
498372	2007 VP_{334}	—	November 14, 2007	Kitt Peak	Spacewatch	·	2.6 km	MPC · JPL
498373	2007 WL_{21}	—	November 5, 2007	Kitt Peak	Spacewatch	·	2.7 km	MPC · JPL
498374	2007 WJ_{22}	—	October 9, 2007	Kitt Peak	Spacewatch	·	620 m	MPC · JPL
498375	2007 WB_{23}	—	October 21, 2007	Kitt Peak	Spacewatch	·	550 m	MPC · JPL
498376	2007 WC_{23}	—	November 1, 2007	Kitt Peak	Spacewatch	·	2.0 km	MPC · JPL
498377	2007 WF_{23}	—	October 10, 2007	Kitt Peak	Spacewatch	EOS	1.8 km	MPC · JPL
498378	2007 WC_{25}	—	November 2, 2007	Kitt Peak	Spacewatch	EMA	2.9 km	MPC · JPL
498379	2007 WR_{26}	—	October 10, 2007	Mount Lemmon	Mount Lemmon Survey	·	2.1 km	MPC · JPL
498380	2007 WX_{27}	—	November 3, 2007	Kitt Peak	Spacewatch	·	2.2 km	MPC · JPL
498381	2007 WX_{45}	—	September 18, 2007	Mount Lemmon	Mount Lemmon Survey	·	530 m	MPC · JPL
498382	2007 WV_{46}	—	November 3, 2007	Mount Lemmon	Mount Lemmon Survey	·	2.5 km	MPC · JPL
498383	2007 WL_{51}	—	November 8, 2007	Kitt Peak	Spacewatch	·	1.5 km	MPC · JPL
498384	2007 WC_{63}	—	November 19, 2007	Kitt Peak	Spacewatch	·	2.4 km	MPC · JPL
498385	2007 XF_{1}	—	October 20, 2007	Mount Lemmon	Mount Lemmon Survey	·	2.3 km	MPC · JPL
498386	2007 XL_{1}	—	October 14, 2007	Mount Lemmon	Mount Lemmon Survey	·	690 m	MPC · JPL
498387	2007 XP_{5}	—	December 4, 2007	Catalina	CSS	·	930 m	MPC · JPL
498388	2007 XT_{8}	—	November 2, 2007	Mount Lemmon	Mount Lemmon Survey	·	2.9 km	MPC · JPL
498389	2007 XR_{14}	—	December 5, 2007	Mount Lemmon	Mount Lemmon Survey	·	2.0 km	MPC · JPL
498390	2007 XN_{24}	—	December 13, 2007	Socorro	LINEAR	H	490 m	MPC · JPL
498391	2007 XC_{25}	—	December 15, 2007	Bergisch Gladbach	W. Bickel	VER	2.4 km	MPC · JPL
498392	2007 XH_{26}	—	October 21, 2007	Mount Lemmon	Mount Lemmon Survey	·	650 m	MPC · JPL
498393	2007 XL_{27}	—	December 4, 2007	Kitt Peak	Spacewatch	·	2.5 km	MPC · JPL
498394 Zhangbosheng	2007 XV_{29}	Zhangbosheng	November 9, 2007	XuYi	PMO NEO Survey Program	·	750 m	MPC · JPL
498395	2007 XW_{31}	—	October 16, 2007	Mount Lemmon	Mount Lemmon Survey	·	2.0 km	MPC · JPL
498396	2007 XW_{40}	—	November 18, 2007	Kitt Peak	Spacewatch	·	620 m	MPC · JPL
498397	2007 XO_{42}	—	December 14, 2007	Mount Lemmon	Mount Lemmon Survey	H	680 m	MPC · JPL
498398	2007 XO_{51}	—	December 4, 2007	Mount Lemmon	Mount Lemmon Survey	·	440 m	MPC · JPL
498399	2007 XG_{53}	—	September 18, 2003	Kitt Peak	Spacewatch	·	860 m	MPC · JPL
498400	2007 YF_{7}	—	November 1, 2007	Kitt Peak	Spacewatch	·	770 m	MPC · JPL

== 498401–498500 ==
back to top

Designation			Discovery			Properties		Ref
Permanent	Provisional	Named after	Date	Site	Discoverer(s)	Category	Diam.	Ref
498401	2007 YU_{35}	—	October 15, 2007	Mount Lemmon	Mount Lemmon Survey	THM	2.2 km	MPC · JPL
498402	2007 YS_{42}	—	November 18, 2007	Mount Lemmon	Mount Lemmon Survey	THB	3.5 km	MPC · JPL
498403	2007 YP_{43}	—	December 30, 2007	Kitt Peak	Spacewatch	·	720 m	MPC · JPL
498404	2007 YM_{47}	—	December 30, 2007	Mount Lemmon	Mount Lemmon Survey	H	580 m	MPC · JPL
498405	2007 YP_{49}	—	December 28, 2007	Kitt Peak	Spacewatch	TIR	3.6 km	MPC · JPL
498406	2007 YF_{50}	—	November 3, 2007	Mount Lemmon	Mount Lemmon Survey	·	2.2 km	MPC · JPL
498407	2007 YD_{51}	—	December 28, 2007	Kitt Peak	Spacewatch	LIX	3.6 km	MPC · JPL
498408	2007 YU_{52}	—	December 18, 2007	Mount Lemmon	Mount Lemmon Survey	·	2.9 km	MPC · JPL
498409	2007 YD_{59}	—	December 31, 2007	La Sagra	OAM	·	3.1 km	MPC · JPL
498410	2007 YZ_{63}	—	December 18, 2007	Mount Lemmon	Mount Lemmon Survey	T_{j} (2.99) · EUP	3.2 km	MPC · JPL
498411	2007 YB_{71}	—	December 16, 2007	Catalina	CSS	·	1.8 km	MPC · JPL
498412	2007 YR_{72}	—	December 30, 2007	Catalina	CSS	·	3.7 km	MPC · JPL
498413	2008 AO_{2}	—	January 6, 2008	La Sagra	OAM	·	3.5 km	MPC · JPL
498414	2008 AA_{5}	—	January 7, 2008	Lulin	LUSS	·	2.5 km	MPC · JPL
498415	2008 AV_{14}	—	December 30, 2007	Kitt Peak	Spacewatch	·	2.7 km	MPC · JPL
498416	2008 AA_{15}	—	January 10, 2008	Kitt Peak	Spacewatch	·	1.2 km	MPC · JPL
498417	2008 AF_{19}	—	January 10, 2008	Mount Lemmon	Mount Lemmon Survey	MAS	720 m	MPC · JPL
498418	2008 AQ_{20}	—	January 10, 2008	Mount Lemmon	Mount Lemmon Survey	V	590 m	MPC · JPL
498419	2008 AG_{21}	—	January 10, 2008	Mount Lemmon	Mount Lemmon Survey	·	1.6 km	MPC · JPL
498420	2008 AZ_{29}	—	January 8, 2008	Altschwendt	W. Ries	·	1.0 km	MPC · JPL
498421	2008 AF_{39}	—	December 30, 2007	Kitt Peak	Spacewatch	·	750 m	MPC · JPL
498422	2008 AZ_{41}	—	January 10, 2008	Mount Lemmon	Mount Lemmon Survey	·	1.4 km	MPC · JPL
498423	2008 AA_{42}	—	January 10, 2008	Mount Lemmon	Mount Lemmon Survey	·	950 m	MPC · JPL
498424	2008 AH_{47}	—	December 16, 2007	Kitt Peak	Spacewatch	·	1.9 km	MPC · JPL
498425	2008 AS_{48}	—	December 28, 2007	Kitt Peak	Spacewatch	·	790 m	MPC · JPL
498426	2008 AE_{49}	—	December 28, 2007	Kitt Peak	Spacewatch	·	520 m	MPC · JPL
498427	2008 AM_{52}	—	October 17, 2007	Mount Lemmon	Mount Lemmon Survey	·	1.9 km	MPC · JPL
498428	2008 AY_{66}	—	January 11, 2008	Kitt Peak	Spacewatch	·	650 m	MPC · JPL
498429	2008 AY_{70}	—	January 12, 2008	Kitt Peak	Spacewatch	·	680 m	MPC · JPL
498430	2008 AX_{75}	—	January 11, 2008	Kitt Peak	Spacewatch	NYS	840 m	MPC · JPL
498431	2008 AY_{75}	—	January 11, 2008	Kitt Peak	Spacewatch	·	740 m	MPC · JPL
498432	2008 AH_{77}	—	January 1, 2008	Kitt Peak	Spacewatch	·	1.3 km	MPC · JPL
498433	2008 AA_{84}	—	January 15, 2008	Kitt Peak	Spacewatch	·	930 m	MPC · JPL
498434	2008 AQ_{91}	—	December 30, 2007	Kitt Peak	Spacewatch	H	620 m	MPC · JPL
498435	2008 AC_{94}	—	January 1, 2008	Kitt Peak	Spacewatch	·	2.5 km	MPC · JPL
498436	2008 AC_{105}	—	December 18, 2007	Mount Lemmon	Mount Lemmon Survey	NYS	980 m	MPC · JPL
498437	2008 AH_{106}	—	November 18, 2007	Mount Lemmon	Mount Lemmon Survey	·	2.7 km	MPC · JPL
498438	2008 AF_{108}	—	January 15, 2008	Kitt Peak	Spacewatch	·	500 m	MPC · JPL
498439	2008 AY_{109}	—	December 14, 2007	Mount Lemmon	Mount Lemmon Survey	·	880 m	MPC · JPL
498440	2008 AO_{110}	—	January 15, 2008	Kitt Peak	Spacewatch	·	2.5 km	MPC · JPL
498441	2008 AZ_{110}	—	January 15, 2008	Kitt Peak	Spacewatch	AMO	770 m	MPC · JPL
498442	2008 AD_{111}	—	January 15, 2008	Kitt Peak	Spacewatch	·	1.1 km	MPC · JPL
498443	2008 AX_{113}	—	January 10, 2008	Mount Lemmon	Mount Lemmon Survey	·	660 m	MPC · JPL
498444	2008 AV_{115}	—	January 11, 2008	Mount Lemmon	Mount Lemmon Survey	·	2.6 km	MPC · JPL
498445	2008 AJ_{116}	—	January 12, 2008	Kitt Peak	Spacewatch	·	2.7 km	MPC · JPL
498446	2008 AN_{116}	—	January 1, 2008	Kitt Peak	Spacewatch	·	2.7 km	MPC · JPL
498447	2008 AY_{116}	—	January 13, 2008	Kitt Peak	Spacewatch	·	2.6 km	MPC · JPL
498448	2008 AA_{138}	—	January 13, 2008	Kitt Peak	Spacewatch	·	3.3 km	MPC · JPL
498449	2008 BM_{16}	—	January 13, 2008	Kitt Peak	Spacewatch	H	480 m	MPC · JPL
498450	2008 BH_{20}	—	December 30, 2007	Mount Lemmon	Mount Lemmon Survey	·	830 m	MPC · JPL
498451	2008 BQ_{26}	—	January 11, 2008	Mount Lemmon	Mount Lemmon Survey	·	1.9 km	MPC · JPL
498452	2008 BL_{29}	—	January 30, 2008	Mount Lemmon	Mount Lemmon Survey	THM	1.8 km	MPC · JPL
498453	2008 BH_{31}	—	January 30, 2008	Mount Lemmon	Mount Lemmon Survey	NYS	1 km	MPC · JPL
498454	2008 BA_{38}	—	January 31, 2008	Mount Lemmon	Mount Lemmon Survey	·	940 m	MPC · JPL
498455	2008 BF_{38}	—	December 31, 2007	Mount Lemmon	Mount Lemmon Survey	·	980 m	MPC · JPL
498456	2008 BK_{41}	—	January 5, 2008	XuYi	PMO NEO Survey Program	·	1.5 km	MPC · JPL
498457	2008 BB_{48}	—	January 16, 2008	Kitt Peak	Spacewatch	·	700 m	MPC · JPL
498458	2008 BE_{53}	—	January 19, 2008	Mount Lemmon	Mount Lemmon Survey	·	2.8 km	MPC · JPL
498459	2008 BN_{53}	—	January 30, 2008	Catalina	CSS	CYB	3.2 km	MPC · JPL
498460	2008 CC_{5}	—	February 2, 2008	Kitt Peak	Spacewatch	H	540 m	MPC · JPL
498461	2008 CD_{8}	—	January 11, 2008	Mount Lemmon	Mount Lemmon Survey	·	980 m	MPC · JPL
498462	2008 CC_{17}	—	February 3, 2008	Kitt Peak	Spacewatch	·	960 m	MPC · JPL
498463	2008 CJ_{21}	—	February 7, 2008	Altschwendt	W. Ries	·	940 m	MPC · JPL
498464	2008 CA_{30}	—	October 14, 2007	Mount Lemmon	Mount Lemmon Survey	·	920 m	MPC · JPL
498465	2008 CE_{30}	—	January 10, 2008	Mount Lemmon	Mount Lemmon Survey	·	680 m	MPC · JPL
498466	2008 CZ_{30}	—	January 19, 2008	Kitt Peak	Spacewatch	·	900 m	MPC · JPL
498467	2008 CM_{34}	—	February 2, 2008	Kitt Peak	Spacewatch	·	870 m	MPC · JPL
498468	2008 CN_{40}	—	February 2, 2008	Kitt Peak	Spacewatch	·	820 m	MPC · JPL
498469	2008 CB_{43}	—	February 2, 2008	Kitt Peak	Spacewatch	·	920 m	MPC · JPL
498470	2008 CY_{48}	—	February 6, 2008	Catalina	CSS	H	560 m	MPC · JPL
498471	2008 CA_{51}	—	February 6, 2008	Purple Mountain	PMO NEO Survey Program	CYB	2.7 km	MPC · JPL
498472	2008 CN_{56}	—	February 7, 2008	Mount Lemmon	Mount Lemmon Survey	·	750 m	MPC · JPL
498473	2008 CC_{57}	—	January 14, 2008	Kitt Peak	Spacewatch	·	1.1 km	MPC · JPL
498474	2008 CQ_{58}	—	February 7, 2008	Mount Lemmon	Mount Lemmon Survey	·	1.1 km	MPC · JPL
498475	2008 CT_{62}	—	February 8, 2008	Kitt Peak	Spacewatch	H	410 m	MPC · JPL
498476	2008 CV_{73}	—	September 11, 2007	Mount Lemmon	Mount Lemmon Survey	·	3.1 km	MPC · JPL
498477	2008 CH_{75}	—	January 10, 2008	Mount Lemmon	Mount Lemmon Survey	NYS	800 m	MPC · JPL
498478	2008 CU_{77}	—	November 29, 2003	Kitt Peak	Spacewatch	NYS	990 m	MPC · JPL
498479	2008 CX_{78}	—	February 7, 2008	Kitt Peak	Spacewatch	·	630 m	MPC · JPL
498480	2008 CA_{84}	—	August 29, 2006	Kitt Peak	Spacewatch	·	910 m	MPC · JPL
498481	2008 CW_{87}	—	February 7, 2008	Mount Lemmon	Mount Lemmon Survey	NYS	1.1 km	MPC · JPL
498482	2008 CQ_{98}	—	January 30, 2008	Mount Lemmon	Mount Lemmon Survey	(3460)	2.3 km	MPC · JPL
498483	2008 CH_{101}	—	February 9, 2008	Mount Lemmon	Mount Lemmon Survey	·	1.4 km	MPC · JPL
498484	2008 CS_{108}	—	February 9, 2008	Catalina	CSS	T_{j} (2.97)	2.8 km	MPC · JPL
498485	2008 CE_{115}	—	February 10, 2008	Kitt Peak	Spacewatch	H	580 m	MPC · JPL
498486	2008 CC_{128}	—	January 11, 2008	Mount Lemmon	Mount Lemmon Survey	·	3.4 km	MPC · JPL
498487	2008 CM_{129}	—	February 8, 2008	Kitt Peak	Spacewatch	·	1.1 km	MPC · JPL
498488	2008 CV_{130}	—	January 30, 2008	Mount Lemmon	Mount Lemmon Survey	NYS	980 m	MPC · JPL
498489	2008 CE_{132}	—	February 8, 2008	Kitt Peak	Spacewatch	MAS	590 m	MPC · JPL
498490	2008 CV_{134}	—	February 8, 2008	Mount Lemmon	Mount Lemmon Survey	NYS	860 m	MPC · JPL
498491	2008 CQ_{161}	—	November 7, 2007	Mount Lemmon	Mount Lemmon Survey	·	1.0 km	MPC · JPL
498492	2008 CF_{176}	—	January 1, 2008	Catalina	CSS	H	470 m	MPC · JPL
498493	2008 CK_{179}	—	November 13, 2007	Mount Lemmon	Mount Lemmon Survey	·	1.7 km	MPC · JPL
498494	2008 CB_{181}	—	February 10, 2008	Anderson Mesa	LONEOS	·	4.5 km	MPC · JPL
498495	2008 CU_{194}	—	February 13, 2008	Kitt Peak	Spacewatch	·	2.7 km	MPC · JPL
498496	2008 CP_{196}	—	February 7, 2008	Kitt Peak	Spacewatch	PHO	770 m	MPC · JPL
498497	2008 CU_{203}	—	February 12, 2008	Kitt Peak	Spacewatch	MAS	620 m	MPC · JPL
498498	2008 CP_{208}	—	February 3, 2008	Kitt Peak	Spacewatch	H	470 m	MPC · JPL
498499	2008 CC_{212}	—	February 7, 2008	Mount Lemmon	Mount Lemmon Survey	PHO	990 m	MPC · JPL
498500	2008 DK_{1}	—	December 1, 2003	Kitt Peak	Spacewatch	·	1.0 km	MPC · JPL

== 498501–498600 ==
back to top

Designation			Discovery			Properties		Ref
Permanent	Provisional	Named after	Date	Site	Discoverer(s)	Category	Diam.	Ref
498501	2008 DJ_{2}	—	January 30, 2008	Kitt Peak	Spacewatch	·	770 m	MPC · JPL
498502	2008 DG_{8}	—	February 24, 2008	Kitt Peak	Spacewatch	·	1.0 km	MPC · JPL
498503	2008 DM_{13}	—	February 26, 2008	Mount Lemmon	Mount Lemmon Survey	·	1.8 km	MPC · JPL
498504	2008 DQ_{17}	—	February 24, 2008	Kitt Peak	Spacewatch	·	950 m	MPC · JPL
498505	2008 DX_{18}	—	February 27, 2008	Kitt Peak	Spacewatch	TIR	2.6 km	MPC · JPL
498506	2008 DF_{22}	—	February 28, 2008	Mount Lemmon	Mount Lemmon Survey	·	980 m	MPC · JPL
498507	2008 DL_{28}	—	January 10, 2008	Kitt Peak	Spacewatch	V	490 m	MPC · JPL
498508	2008 DN_{30}	—	February 8, 2008	Kitt Peak	Spacewatch	HNS	1.4 km	MPC · JPL
498509	2008 DA_{40}	—	February 27, 2008	Mount Lemmon	Mount Lemmon Survey	·	940 m	MPC · JPL
498510	2008 DC_{45}	—	February 7, 2008	Mount Lemmon	Mount Lemmon Survey	·	840 m	MPC · JPL
498511	2008 DK_{56}	—	November 19, 2007	Kitt Peak	Spacewatch	·	3.3 km	MPC · JPL
498512	2008 DM_{60}	—	February 28, 2008	Mount Lemmon	Mount Lemmon Survey	TIR	2.4 km	MPC · JPL
498513	2008 DG_{76}	—	February 7, 2008	Kitt Peak	Spacewatch	MAS	580 m	MPC · JPL
498514	2008 DL_{81}	—	February 27, 2008	Kitt Peak	Spacewatch	·	970 m	MPC · JPL
498515	2008 EQ_{6}	—	January 9, 2008	Mount Lemmon	Mount Lemmon Survey	·	2.1 km	MPC · JPL
498516	2008 EW_{10}	—	March 1, 2008	Kitt Peak	Spacewatch	SUL	1.7 km	MPC · JPL
498517	2008 ED_{12}	—	February 10, 2008	Kitt Peak	Spacewatch	·	930 m	MPC · JPL
498518	2008 ER_{19}	—	January 30, 2008	Mount Lemmon	Mount Lemmon Survey	CYB	3.8 km	MPC · JPL
498519	2008 EE_{33}	—	March 1, 2008	Kitt Peak	Spacewatch	H	530 m	MPC · JPL
498520	2008 EV_{57}	—	February 28, 2008	Kitt Peak	Spacewatch	T_{j} (2.98) · EUP	3.7 km	MPC · JPL
498521	2008 EK_{60}	—	February 7, 2008	Mount Lemmon	Mount Lemmon Survey	H	430 m	MPC · JPL
498522	2008 EM_{72}	—	February 18, 2008	Mount Lemmon	Mount Lemmon Survey	H	490 m	MPC · JPL
498523	2008 EJ_{76}	—	March 7, 2008	Kitt Peak	Spacewatch	MAS	560 m	MPC · JPL
498524	2008 EO_{112}	—	March 8, 2008	Kitt Peak	Spacewatch	·	1.3 km	MPC · JPL
498525	2008 EC_{131}	—	February 18, 2008	Mount Lemmon	Mount Lemmon Survey	·	1.1 km	MPC · JPL
498526	2008 EG_{152}	—	March 10, 2008	Kitt Peak	Spacewatch	EUN	810 m	MPC · JPL
498527	2008 EU_{161}	—	March 10, 2008	Kitt Peak	Spacewatch	·	1.2 km	MPC · JPL
498528	2008 FB_{5}	—	March 9, 2008	Kitt Peak	Spacewatch	THB	2.5 km	MPC · JPL
498529	2008 FA_{55}	—	March 5, 2008	Kitt Peak	Spacewatch	·	1.8 km	MPC · JPL
498530	2008 FA_{84}	—	March 28, 2008	Kitt Peak	Spacewatch	·	1.2 km	MPC · JPL
498531	2008 FV_{97}	—	March 30, 2008	Kitt Peak	Spacewatch	·	1.1 km	MPC · JPL
498532	2008 FM_{104}	—	March 30, 2008	Kitt Peak	Spacewatch	·	1.2 km	MPC · JPL
498533	2008 FB_{108}	—	March 31, 2008	Kitt Peak	Spacewatch	·	1.3 km	MPC · JPL
498534	2008 FD_{108}	—	March 31, 2008	Vail-Jarnac	Jarnac	·	1.4 km	MPC · JPL
498535	2008 FN_{126}	—	March 29, 2008	Kitt Peak	Spacewatch	·	1.1 km	MPC · JPL
498536	2008 FT_{130}	—	March 30, 2008	Kitt Peak	Spacewatch	L5	7.3 km	MPC · JPL
498537	2008 FV_{131}	—	March 28, 2008	Mount Lemmon	Mount Lemmon Survey	3:2	4.7 km	MPC · JPL
498538	2008 GX_{5}	—	March 10, 2008	Mount Lemmon	Mount Lemmon Survey	·	1.1 km	MPC · JPL
498539	2008 GY_{8}	—	April 1, 2008	Mount Lemmon	Mount Lemmon Survey	·	840 m	MPC · JPL
498540	2008 GN_{12}	—	April 3, 2008	Kitt Peak	Spacewatch	H	520 m	MPC · JPL
498541	2008 GA_{26}	—	March 10, 2008	Mount Lemmon	Mount Lemmon Survey	·	670 m	MPC · JPL
498542	2008 GP_{35}	—	April 3, 2008	Kitt Peak	Spacewatch	·	1.1 km	MPC · JPL
498543	2008 GO_{36}	—	April 3, 2008	Kitt Peak	Spacewatch	·	860 m	MPC · JPL
498544	2008 GB_{44}	—	April 4, 2008	Kitt Peak	Spacewatch	·	1.3 km	MPC · JPL
498545	2008 GJ_{50}	—	March 28, 2008	Mount Lemmon	Mount Lemmon Survey	·	770 m	MPC · JPL
498546	2008 GH_{70}	—	April 6, 2008	Mount Lemmon	Mount Lemmon Survey	·	1.8 km	MPC · JPL
498547	2008 GX_{90}	—	April 6, 2008	Mount Lemmon	Mount Lemmon Survey	·	930 m	MPC · JPL
498548	2008 GH_{110}	—	April 14, 2008	Mount Lemmon	Mount Lemmon Survey	APO	350 m	MPC · JPL
498549	2008 GD_{119}	—	April 11, 2008	Kitt Peak	Spacewatch	·	1.1 km	MPC · JPL
498550	2008 HV_{4}	—	April 30, 2008	Mount Lemmon	Mount Lemmon Survey	AMO	420 m	MPC · JPL
498551	2008 HT_{7}	—	April 24, 2008	Kitt Peak	Spacewatch	·	1.3 km	MPC · JPL
498552	2008 HK_{9}	—	March 5, 2008	Kitt Peak	Spacewatch	MAS	560 m	MPC · JPL
498553	2008 HV_{16}	—	April 25, 2008	Mount Lemmon	Mount Lemmon Survey	NYS	960 m	MPC · JPL
498554	2008 HG_{17}	—	April 25, 2008	Kitt Peak	Spacewatch	·	1.2 km	MPC · JPL
498555	2008 HH_{35}	—	April 15, 2008	Mount Lemmon	Mount Lemmon Survey	·	1.5 km	MPC · JPL
498556	2008 HS_{46}	—	April 28, 2008	Mount Lemmon	Mount Lemmon Survey	·	1.3 km	MPC · JPL
498557	2008 HW_{46}	—	April 28, 2008	Kitt Peak	Spacewatch	·	1.5 km	MPC · JPL
498558	2008 JE_{3}	—	April 15, 2008	Mount Lemmon	Mount Lemmon Survey	·	1.3 km	MPC · JPL
498559	2008 JX_{6}	—	April 15, 2008	Kitt Peak	Spacewatch	·	980 m	MPC · JPL
498560	2008 JS_{23}	—	April 25, 2008	Kitt Peak	Spacewatch	·	1.0 km	MPC · JPL
498561	2008 JO_{30}	—	April 13, 2008	Mount Lemmon	Mount Lemmon Survey	·	1.1 km	MPC · JPL
498562	2008 JW_{36}	—	May 8, 2008	Kitt Peak	Spacewatch	·	1.0 km	MPC · JPL
498563	2008 KL_{1}	—	May 26, 2008	Kitt Peak	Spacewatch	·	1.5 km	MPC · JPL
498564	2008 KS_{5}	—	May 28, 2008	Kitt Peak	Spacewatch	·	1.1 km	MPC · JPL
498565	2008 KV_{7}	—	April 29, 2008	Kitt Peak	Spacewatch	·	1.0 km	MPC · JPL
498566	2008 KM_{22}	—	May 8, 2008	Kitt Peak	Spacewatch	·	910 m	MPC · JPL
498567	2008 KZ_{29}	—	May 11, 2008	Mount Lemmon	Mount Lemmon Survey	EUN	990 m	MPC · JPL
498568	2008 KS_{38}	—	May 3, 2008	Kitt Peak	Spacewatch	·	970 m	MPC · JPL
498569	2008 KG_{41}	—	April 8, 2008	Kitt Peak	Spacewatch	·	960 m	MPC · JPL
498570	2008 LM_{6}	—	May 3, 2008	Kitt Peak	Spacewatch	·	1.2 km	MPC · JPL
498571	2008 LC_{8}	—	May 5, 2008	Mount Lemmon	Mount Lemmon Survey	·	1.3 km	MPC · JPL
498572	2008 LD_{9}	—	June 3, 2008	Kitt Peak	Spacewatch	MAR	890 m	MPC · JPL
498573	2008 LX_{9}	—	May 29, 2008	Kitt Peak	Spacewatch	·	930 m	MPC · JPL
498574	2008 LC_{11}	—	January 10, 2007	Kitt Peak	Spacewatch	·	1 km	MPC · JPL
498575	2008 LU_{13}	—	May 27, 2008	Kitt Peak	Spacewatch	·	970 m	MPC · JPL
498576	2008 LQ_{15}	—	May 14, 2008	Mount Lemmon	Mount Lemmon Survey	·	1.4 km	MPC · JPL
498577	2008 NV_{1}	—	June 9, 2008	Kitt Peak	Spacewatch	·	1.4 km	MPC · JPL
498578	2008 NX_{2}	—	July 5, 2008	La Sagra	OAM	·	3.7 km	MPC · JPL
498579	2008 OM_{1}	—	July 26, 2008	La Sagra	OAM	·	4.6 km	MPC · JPL
498580	2008 OG_{4}	—	July 26, 2008	Siding Spring	SSS	·	3.2 km	MPC · JPL
498581	2008 PA_{18}	—	August 13, 2008	La Sagra	OAM	·	3.0 km	MPC · JPL
498582	2008 QA_{2}	—	August 24, 2008	La Sagra	OAM	·	1.5 km	MPC · JPL
498583	2008 QT_{12}	—	August 26, 2008	La Sagra	OAM	·	1.9 km	MPC · JPL
498584	2008 QU_{13}	—	July 29, 2008	Kitt Peak	Spacewatch	·	1.3 km	MPC · JPL
498585	2008 QV_{16}	—	August 26, 2008	La Sagra	OAM	·	3.1 km	MPC · JPL
498586	2008 QC_{22}	—	August 12, 2008	La Sagra	OAM	·	1.5 km	MPC · JPL
498587	2008 QS_{29}	—	August 24, 2008	La Sagra	OAM	EUN	1.5 km	MPC · JPL
498588	2008 QN_{30}	—	August 30, 2008	Socorro	LINEAR	·	2.0 km	MPC · JPL
498589	2008 QM_{34}	—	August 7, 2008	Kitt Peak	Spacewatch	·	1.9 km	MPC · JPL
498590	2008 QE_{38}	—	August 23, 2008	Kitt Peak	Spacewatch	·	1.3 km	MPC · JPL
498591	2008 QJ_{40}	—	August 29, 2008	La Sagra	OAM	·	2.1 km	MPC · JPL
498592	2008 QD_{45}	—	August 26, 2008	La Sagra	OAM	·	2.8 km	MPC · JPL
498593	2008 QU_{46}	—	August 30, 2008	Socorro	LINEAR	·	1.7 km	MPC · JPL
498594	2008 QP_{47}	—	August 24, 2008	Socorro	LINEAR	GAL	1.6 km	MPC · JPL
498595	2008 RD	—	August 2, 2008	Siding Spring	SSS	·	1.4 km	MPC · JPL
498596	2008 RM_{9}	—	September 3, 2008	Kitt Peak	Spacewatch	DOR	2.0 km	MPC · JPL
498597	2008 RK_{29}	—	September 2, 2008	Kitt Peak	Spacewatch	·	1.3 km	MPC · JPL
498598	2008 RS_{30}	—	September 2, 2008	Kitt Peak	Spacewatch	MRX	870 m	MPC · JPL
498599	2008 RN_{32}	—	September 2, 2008	Kitt Peak	Spacewatch	·	2.2 km	MPC · JPL
498600	2008 RD_{35}	—	September 2, 2008	Kitt Peak	Spacewatch	AGN	970 m	MPC · JPL

== 498601–498700 ==
back to top

Designation			Discovery			Properties		Ref
Permanent	Provisional	Named after	Date	Site	Discoverer(s)	Category	Diam.	Ref
498601	2008 RV_{37}	—	September 2, 2008	Kitt Peak	Spacewatch	HOF	2.1 km	MPC · JPL
498602	2008 RW_{42}	—	September 2, 2008	Kitt Peak	Spacewatch	·	1.7 km	MPC · JPL
498603	2008 RZ_{44}	—	September 2, 2008	Kitt Peak	Spacewatch	HOF	2.2 km	MPC · JPL
498604	2008 RZ_{46}	—	September 2, 2008	Kitt Peak	Spacewatch	·	1.4 km	MPC · JPL
498605	2008 RM_{47}	—	August 2, 2008	La Sagra	OAM	·	2.5 km	MPC · JPL
498606	2008 RF_{58}	—	September 3, 2008	Kitt Peak	Spacewatch	·	1.4 km	MPC · JPL
498607	2008 RJ_{62}	—	September 4, 2008	Kitt Peak	Spacewatch	GEF	950 m	MPC · JPL
498608	2008 RR_{77}	—	September 7, 2008	Mount Lemmon	Mount Lemmon Survey	·	1.7 km	MPC · JPL
498609	2008 RZ_{77}	—	September 4, 2008	Kitt Peak	Spacewatch	AGN	1.6 km	MPC · JPL
498610	2008 RY_{79}	—	September 5, 2008	Kitt Peak	Spacewatch	·	1.2 km	MPC · JPL
498611	2008 RJ_{81}	—	September 4, 2008	Kitt Peak	Spacewatch	·	1.3 km	MPC · JPL
498612	2008 RG_{97}	—	September 7, 2008	Mount Lemmon	Mount Lemmon Survey	·	1.6 km	MPC · JPL
498613	2008 RY_{100}	—	September 5, 2008	Kitt Peak	Spacewatch	·	1.9 km	MPC · JPL
498614	2008 RU_{101}	—	September 2, 2008	Kitt Peak	Spacewatch	·	1.3 km	MPC · JPL
498615	2008 RE_{102}	—	September 3, 2008	Kitt Peak	Spacewatch	·	1.4 km	MPC · JPL
498616	2008 RJ_{103}	—	September 5, 2008	Kitt Peak	Spacewatch	L4	6.9 km	MPC · JPL
498617	2008 RF_{108}	—	September 9, 2008	Kitt Peak	Spacewatch	·	1.9 km	MPC · JPL
498618	2008 RN_{108}	—	September 9, 2008	Mount Lemmon	Mount Lemmon Survey	·	1.7 km	MPC · JPL
498619	2008 RQ_{110}	—	September 3, 2008	Kitt Peak	Spacewatch	·	1.8 km	MPC · JPL
498620	2008 RS_{110}	—	September 3, 2008	Kitt Peak	Spacewatch	·	1.5 km	MPC · JPL
498621	2008 RZ_{110}	—	September 3, 2008	Kitt Peak	Spacewatch	KOR	1.2 km	MPC · JPL
498622	2008 RH_{116}	—	September 7, 2008	Catalina	CSS	·	2.0 km	MPC · JPL
498623	2008 RP_{117}	—	September 9, 2008	Kitt Peak	Spacewatch	·	1.8 km	MPC · JPL
498624	2008 RR_{117}	—	September 9, 2008	Kitt Peak	Spacewatch	·	1.9 km	MPC · JPL
498625	2008 RP_{121}	—	September 2, 2008	Kitt Peak	Spacewatch	·	2.7 km	MPC · JPL
498626	2008 RM_{122}	—	September 4, 2008	Kitt Peak	Spacewatch	·	2.1 km	MPC · JPL
498627	2008 RB_{126}	—	September 9, 2008	Mount Lemmon	Mount Lemmon Survey	·	1.5 km	MPC · JPL
498628	2008 RC_{128}	—	September 7, 2008	Mount Lemmon	Mount Lemmon Survey	HNS	1.1 km	MPC · JPL
498629	2008 RE_{133}	—	September 10, 2008	Charleston	Astronomical Research Observatory	·	3.1 km	MPC · JPL
498630	2008 RK_{133}	—	September 6, 2008	Catalina	CSS	JUN	1.0 km	MPC · JPL
498631	2008 RO_{134}	—	September 4, 2008	Kitt Peak	Spacewatch	·	1.6 km	MPC · JPL
498632	2008 RZ_{134}	—	September 2, 2008	Kitt Peak	Spacewatch	·	1.5 km	MPC · JPL
498633	2008 RA_{135}	—	September 2, 2008	Kitt Peak	Spacewatch	·	1.7 km	MPC · JPL
498634	2008 RT_{139}	—	September 7, 2008	Catalina	CSS	·	1.6 km	MPC · JPL
498635	2008 RC_{142}	—	September 5, 2008	Socorro	LINEAR	·	1.9 km	MPC · JPL
498636	2008 RG_{144}	—	September 2, 2008	Kitt Peak	Spacewatch	·	1.5 km	MPC · JPL
498637	2008 RJ_{146}	—	September 6, 2008	Kitt Peak	Spacewatch	·	2.0 km	MPC · JPL
498638	2008 SL_{10}	—	September 5, 2008	Kitt Peak	Spacewatch	·	1.6 km	MPC · JPL
498639	2008 SM_{15}	—	August 28, 2008	La Sagra	OAM	·	1.9 km	MPC · JPL
498640	2008 SO_{25}	—	September 19, 2008	Kitt Peak	Spacewatch	·	2.5 km	MPC · JPL
498641	2008 SZ_{31}	—	September 20, 2008	Kitt Peak	Spacewatch	·	2.6 km	MPC · JPL
498642	2008 SZ_{32}	—	July 29, 2008	Kitt Peak	Spacewatch	NEM	1.8 km	MPC · JPL
498643	2008 SN_{33}	—	September 20, 2008	Mount Lemmon	Mount Lemmon Survey	·	1.2 km	MPC · JPL
498644	2008 SB_{43}	—	September 20, 2008	Kitt Peak	Spacewatch	·	3.8 km	MPC · JPL
498645	2008 SZ_{43}	—	September 9, 2008	Mount Lemmon	Mount Lemmon Survey	GEF	1.1 km	MPC · JPL
498646	2008 SG_{48}	—	September 20, 2008	Mount Lemmon	Mount Lemmon Survey	AGN	1.1 km	MPC · JPL
498647	2008 SM_{63}	—	September 21, 2008	Kitt Peak	Spacewatch	HOF	2.5 km	MPC · JPL
498648	2008 SO_{67}	—	September 21, 2008	Kitt Peak	Spacewatch	HOF	2.4 km	MPC · JPL
498649	2008 SC_{81}	—	September 23, 2008	Mount Lemmon	Mount Lemmon Survey	·	1.7 km	MPC · JPL
498650	2008 SE_{88}	—	September 20, 2008	Mount Lemmon	Mount Lemmon Survey	·	1.9 km	MPC · JPL
498651	2008 SW_{88}	—	September 5, 2008	Kitt Peak	Spacewatch	·	1.5 km	MPC · JPL
498652	2008 SX_{88}	—	September 5, 2008	Kitt Peak	Spacewatch	NEM	1.9 km	MPC · JPL
498653	2008 SJ_{90}	—	September 21, 2008	Kitt Peak	Spacewatch	MRX	1.0 km	MPC · JPL
498654	2008 SG_{101}	—	September 21, 2008	Kitt Peak	Spacewatch	·	1.9 km	MPC · JPL
498655	2008 SM_{101}	—	September 21, 2008	Kitt Peak	Spacewatch	·	1.9 km	MPC · JPL
498656	2008 SC_{107}	—	September 21, 2008	Kitt Peak	Spacewatch	·	1.5 km	MPC · JPL
498657	2008 SN_{112}	—	September 22, 2008	Kitt Peak	Spacewatch	·	1.8 km	MPC · JPL
498658	2008 SQ_{115}	—	March 4, 2006	Kitt Peak	Spacewatch	HNS	1.1 km	MPC · JPL
498659	2008 SP_{122}	—	September 22, 2008	Mount Lemmon	Mount Lemmon Survey	·	1.7 km	MPC · JPL
498660	2008 SC_{127}	—	September 22, 2008	Kitt Peak	Spacewatch	·	1.8 km	MPC · JPL
498661	2008 SG_{127}	—	September 22, 2008	Kitt Peak	Spacewatch	AGN	870 m	MPC · JPL
498662	2008 SQ_{127}	—	September 22, 2008	Catalina	CSS	·	2.2 km	MPC · JPL
498663	2008 SL_{128}	—	September 22, 2008	Kitt Peak	Spacewatch	·	2.1 km	MPC · JPL
498664	2008 SZ_{136}	—	September 23, 2008	Catalina	CSS	·	1.1 km	MPC · JPL
498665	2008 SA_{139}	—	September 23, 2008	Kitt Peak	Spacewatch	·	1.8 km	MPC · JPL
498666	2008 SQ_{141}	—	September 16, 2003	Kitt Peak	Spacewatch	(16286)	1.8 km	MPC · JPL
498667	2008 SS_{141}	—	September 24, 2008	Kitt Peak	Spacewatch	·	1.8 km	MPC · JPL
498668	2008 SM_{151}	—	September 3, 2008	Kitt Peak	Spacewatch	MRX	910 m	MPC · JPL
498669	2008 SV_{162}	—	September 3, 2008	Kitt Peak	Spacewatch	·	2.2 km	MPC · JPL
498670	2008 SD_{171}	—	August 24, 2008	Kitt Peak	Spacewatch	·	1.7 km	MPC · JPL
498671	2008 ST_{171}	—	September 5, 2008	Kitt Peak	Spacewatch	·	1.4 km	MPC · JPL
498672	2008 SO_{174}	—	September 22, 2008	Catalina	CSS	·	1.9 km	MPC · JPL
498673	2008 SS_{182}	—	September 24, 2008	Mount Lemmon	Mount Lemmon Survey	KOR	1.2 km	MPC · JPL
498674	2008 SM_{185}	—	September 24, 2008	Kitt Peak	Spacewatch	·	2.7 km	MPC · JPL
498675	2008 SF_{187}	—	September 25, 2008	Kitt Peak	Spacewatch	·	2.4 km	MPC · JPL
498676	2008 SP_{187}	—	September 25, 2008	Kitt Peak	Spacewatch	AGN	900 m	MPC · JPL
498677	2008 SS_{207}	—	September 27, 2008	Catalina	CSS	·	1.6 km	MPC · JPL
498678	2008 SU_{223}	—	September 25, 2008	Mount Lemmon	Mount Lemmon Survey	·	1.6 km	MPC · JPL
498679	2008 SB_{228}	—	September 5, 2008	Kitt Peak	Spacewatch	·	1.5 km	MPC · JPL
498680	2008 SH_{242}	—	September 29, 2008	Kitt Peak	Spacewatch	·	2.2 km	MPC · JPL
498681	2008 ST_{242}	—	September 29, 2008	Kitt Peak	Spacewatch	·	1.7 km	MPC · JPL
498682	2008 SJ_{250}	—	September 23, 2008	Kitt Peak	Spacewatch	AGN	1.1 km	MPC · JPL
498683	2008 SO_{256}	—	September 20, 2008	Kitt Peak	Spacewatch	·	1.9 km	MPC · JPL
498684	2008 SO_{260}	—	September 23, 2008	Kitt Peak	Spacewatch	·	1.6 km	MPC · JPL
498685	2008 SX_{261}	—	September 24, 2008	Kitt Peak	Spacewatch	·	1.6 km	MPC · JPL
498686	2008 SL_{267}	—	September 23, 2008	Mount Lemmon	Mount Lemmon Survey	KOR	1.1 km	MPC · JPL
498687	2008 SV_{270}	—	September 25, 2008	Mount Lemmon	Mount Lemmon Survey	·	1.8 km	MPC · JPL
498688	2008 SX_{271}	—	September 26, 2008	Kitt Peak	Spacewatch	·	1.7 km	MPC · JPL
498689	2008 SL_{273}	—	September 24, 2008	Mount Lemmon	Mount Lemmon Survey	HOF	3.1 km	MPC · JPL
498690	2008 SZ_{273}	—	September 23, 2008	Kitt Peak	Spacewatch	AGN	970 m	MPC · JPL
498691	2008 ST_{275}	—	September 23, 2008	Mount Lemmon	Mount Lemmon Survey	L4	6.7 km	MPC · JPL
498692	2008 SS_{280}	—	September 24, 2008	Kitt Peak	Spacewatch	·	2.0 km	MPC · JPL
498693	2008 SB_{283}	—	September 21, 2008	Mount Lemmon	Mount Lemmon Survey	·	2.5 km	MPC · JPL
498694	2008 SY_{283}	—	September 23, 2008	Mount Lemmon	Mount Lemmon Survey	·	1.8 km	MPC · JPL
498695	2008 SM_{300}	—	September 23, 2008	Kitt Peak	Spacewatch	·	2.3 km	MPC · JPL
498696	2008 SV_{306}	—	September 29, 2008	Socorro	LINEAR	·	1.8 km	MPC · JPL
498697	2008 SF_{307}	—	September 29, 2008	Socorro	LINEAR	·	2.2 km	MPC · JPL
498698	2008 SQ_{307}	—	September 29, 2008	Catalina	CSS	·	1.7 km	MPC · JPL
498699	2008 SR_{309}	—	September 24, 2008	Kitt Peak	Spacewatch	·	3.1 km	MPC · JPL
498700	2008 TR	—	October 1, 2008	Hibiscus	S. F. Hönig, Teamo, N.	DOR	2.4 km	MPC · JPL

== 498701–498800 ==
back to top

Designation			Discovery			Properties		Ref
Permanent	Provisional	Named after	Date	Site	Discoverer(s)	Category	Diam.	Ref
498701	2008 TJ_{11}	—	October 1, 2008	Mount Lemmon	Mount Lemmon Survey	·	1.7 km	MPC · JPL
498702	2008 TQ_{20}	—	October 1, 2008	Mount Lemmon	Mount Lemmon Survey	EOS	1.6 km	MPC · JPL
498703	2008 TV_{28}	—	September 7, 2008	Catalina	CSS	·	1.7 km	MPC · JPL
498704	2008 TR_{43}	—	October 1, 2008	Mount Lemmon	Mount Lemmon Survey	·	690 m	MPC · JPL
498705	2008 TX_{48}	—	September 5, 2008	Kitt Peak	Spacewatch	MRX	1.0 km	MPC · JPL
498706	2008 TF_{60}	—	September 3, 2008	Kitt Peak	Spacewatch	·	1.4 km	MPC · JPL
498707	2008 TF_{63}	—	September 26, 2008	Kitt Peak	Spacewatch	KOR	1.0 km	MPC · JPL
498708	2008 TG_{77}	—	September 3, 2008	Kitt Peak	Spacewatch	GEF	1.1 km	MPC · JPL
498709	2008 TE_{80}	—	October 2, 2008	Mount Lemmon	Mount Lemmon Survey	·	1.5 km	MPC · JPL
498710	2008 TW_{83}	—	September 25, 2008	Kitt Peak	Spacewatch	·	1.8 km	MPC · JPL
498711	2008 TS_{84}	—	September 7, 2008	Mount Lemmon	Mount Lemmon Survey	·	1.8 km	MPC · JPL
498712	2008 TE_{88}	—	September 21, 2008	Kitt Peak	Spacewatch	·	1.8 km	MPC · JPL
498713	2008 TN_{90}	—	October 3, 2008	Kitt Peak	Spacewatch	·	700 m	MPC · JPL
498714	2008 TW_{92}	—	September 3, 2008	Kitt Peak	Spacewatch	·	1.8 km	MPC · JPL
498715	2008 TJ_{104}	—	September 26, 2008	Kitt Peak	Spacewatch	·	1.6 km	MPC · JPL
498716	2008 TM_{104}	—	October 6, 2008	Kitt Peak	Spacewatch	·	1.6 km	MPC · JPL
498717	2008 TO_{104}	—	January 30, 2006	Kitt Peak	Spacewatch	·	1.7 km	MPC · JPL
498718	2008 TP_{105}	—	September 9, 2008	Mount Lemmon	Mount Lemmon Survey	·	1.5 km	MPC · JPL
498719	2008 TZ_{107}	—	October 6, 2008	Mount Lemmon	Mount Lemmon Survey	AGN	1.0 km	MPC · JPL
498720	2008 TM_{108}	—	October 6, 2008	Mount Lemmon	Mount Lemmon Survey	·	1.6 km	MPC · JPL
498721	2008 TB_{109}	—	September 23, 2008	Mount Lemmon	Mount Lemmon Survey	(13314)	1.9 km	MPC · JPL
498722	2008 TW_{112}	—	September 23, 2008	Catalina	CSS	·	2.1 km	MPC · JPL
498723	2008 TN_{113}	—	October 6, 2008	Kitt Peak	Spacewatch	KOR	1.3 km	MPC · JPL
498724	2008 TQ_{114}	—	September 27, 2008	Mount Lemmon	Mount Lemmon Survey	HOF	2.2 km	MPC · JPL
498725	2008 TG_{115}	—	October 6, 2008	Catalina	CSS	·	2.0 km	MPC · JPL
498726	2008 TA_{116}	—	October 6, 2008	Catalina	CSS	·	1.6 km	MPC · JPL
498727	2008 TF_{119}	—	September 5, 2008	Kitt Peak	Spacewatch	·	1.4 km	MPC · JPL
498728	2008 TA_{120}	—	October 7, 2008	Kitt Peak	Spacewatch	PAD	1.7 km	MPC · JPL
498729	2008 TE_{125}	—	September 23, 2008	Kitt Peak	Spacewatch	HOF	2.7 km	MPC · JPL
498730	2008 TY_{126}	—	October 8, 2008	Mount Lemmon	Mount Lemmon Survey	·	1.6 km	MPC · JPL
498731	2008 TF_{127}	—	September 23, 2008	Kitt Peak	Spacewatch	·	1.7 km	MPC · JPL
498732	2008 TL_{135}	—	October 8, 2008	Kitt Peak	Spacewatch	·	1.6 km	MPC · JPL
498733	2008 TU_{136}	—	October 1, 2008	Kitt Peak	Spacewatch	KOR	1.2 km	MPC · JPL
498734	2008 TA_{139}	—	October 8, 2008	Mount Lemmon	Mount Lemmon Survey	·	1.9 km	MPC · JPL
498735	2008 TB_{140}	—	September 23, 2008	Kitt Peak	Spacewatch	AGN	1.2 km	MPC · JPL
498736	2008 TB_{148}	—	September 29, 2008	Catalina	CSS	·	1.8 km	MPC · JPL
498737	2008 TZ_{148}	—	October 9, 2008	Mount Lemmon	Mount Lemmon Survey	HOF	2.0 km	MPC · JPL
498738	2008 TS_{151}	—	September 3, 2008	Kitt Peak	Spacewatch	·	1.7 km	MPC · JPL
498739	2008 TN_{152}	—	September 29, 2008	Catalina	CSS	·	1.7 km	MPC · JPL
498740	2008 TK_{160}	—	October 1, 2008	Mount Lemmon	Mount Lemmon Survey	KOR	1.0 km	MPC · JPL
498741	2008 TL_{160}	—	October 1, 2008	Kitt Peak	Spacewatch	HOF	2.3 km	MPC · JPL
498742	2008 TP_{160}	—	October 2, 2008	Kitt Peak	Spacewatch	·	1.3 km	MPC · JPL
498743	2008 TW_{160}	—	October 2, 2008	Kitt Peak	Spacewatch	·	1.4 km	MPC · JPL
498744	2008 TY_{160}	—	October 8, 2008	Kitt Peak	Spacewatch	·	2.0 km	MPC · JPL
498745	2008 TU_{163}	—	October 1, 2008	Kitt Peak	Spacewatch	KOR	960 m	MPC · JPL
498746	2008 TH_{166}	—	October 6, 2008	Mount Lemmon	Mount Lemmon Survey	·	1.3 km	MPC · JPL
498747	2008 TH_{169}	—	October 7, 2008	Kitt Peak	Spacewatch	·	1.8 km	MPC · JPL
498748	2008 TK_{178}	—	October 1, 2008	Catalina	CSS	·	3.1 km	MPC · JPL
498749	2008 TT_{181}	—	October 1, 2008	Kitt Peak	Spacewatch	·	1.5 km	MPC · JPL
498750	2008 UP_{2}	—	October 22, 2008	Goodricke-Pigott	R. A. Tucker	·	2.2 km	MPC · JPL
498751	2008 UF_{6}	—	October 21, 2008	Mount Lemmon	Mount Lemmon Survey	·	2.2 km	MPC · JPL
498752	2008 UP_{6}	—	October 22, 2008	Mount Lemmon	Mount Lemmon Survey	AGN	1 km	MPC · JPL
498753	2008 UJ_{8}	—	September 2, 2008	Kitt Peak	Spacewatch	·	1.6 km	MPC · JPL
498754	2008 UM_{10}	—	September 4, 2008	Kitt Peak	Spacewatch	AGN	990 m	MPC · JPL
498755	2008 UU_{10}	—	September 4, 2008	Kitt Peak	Spacewatch	·	1.6 km	MPC · JPL
498756	2008 UX_{10}	—	September 5, 2008	Kitt Peak	Spacewatch	·	1.6 km	MPC · JPL
498757	2008 UZ_{11}	—	September 4, 2008	Kitt Peak	Spacewatch	·	1.4 km	MPC · JPL
498758	2008 UX_{12}	—	October 17, 2008	Kitt Peak	Spacewatch	·	1.4 km	MPC · JPL
498759	2008 UA_{14}	—	October 17, 2008	Kitt Peak	Spacewatch	AGN	1 km	MPC · JPL
498760	2008 UQ_{23}	—	October 20, 2008	Kitt Peak	Spacewatch	(12739)	1.5 km	MPC · JPL
498761	2008 UH_{33}	—	October 20, 2008	Kitt Peak	Spacewatch	·	830 m	MPC · JPL
498762	2008 UG_{34}	—	October 6, 2008	Mount Lemmon	Mount Lemmon Survey	·	1.7 km	MPC · JPL
498763	2008 UM_{37}	—	October 20, 2008	Kitt Peak	Spacewatch	·	1.6 km	MPC · JPL
498764	2008 UJ_{40}	—	October 20, 2008	Kitt Peak	Spacewatch	HOF	2.3 km	MPC · JPL
498765	2008 UZ_{51}	—	October 20, 2008	Mount Lemmon	Mount Lemmon Survey	H	430 m	MPC · JPL
498766	2008 UA_{54}	—	October 20, 2008	Kitt Peak	Spacewatch	·	1.8 km	MPC · JPL
498767	2008 UW_{59}	—	October 21, 2008	Kitt Peak	Spacewatch	DOR	2.1 km	MPC · JPL
498768	2008 UY_{68}	—	September 24, 2008	Mount Lemmon	Mount Lemmon Survey	NEM	1.9 km	MPC · JPL
498769	2008 UT_{80}	—	October 8, 2008	Kitt Peak	Spacewatch	·	1.7 km	MPC · JPL
498770	2008 UE_{82}	—	October 7, 2008	Mount Lemmon	Mount Lemmon Survey	·	1.9 km	MPC · JPL
498771	2008 UE_{84}	—	October 23, 2008	Kitt Peak	Spacewatch	AGN	1.0 km	MPC · JPL
498772	2008 UG_{85}	—	September 24, 2008	Kitt Peak	Spacewatch	NYS	840 m	MPC · JPL
498773	2008 UV_{92}	—	May 28, 2003	Kitt Peak	Spacewatch	(32418)	2.0 km	MPC · JPL
498774	2008 UR_{93}	—	October 24, 2008	Catalina	CSS	·	2.6 km	MPC · JPL
498775	2008 UM_{108}	—	October 21, 2008	Mount Lemmon	Mount Lemmon Survey	·	2.1 km	MPC · JPL
498776	2008 UC_{115}	—	October 22, 2008	Kitt Peak	Spacewatch	·	2.3 km	MPC · JPL
498777	2008 UZ_{129}	—	October 23, 2008	Kitt Peak	Spacewatch	KOR	1.0 km	MPC · JPL
498778	2008 UA_{135}	—	October 1, 2008	Mount Lemmon	Mount Lemmon Survey	KOR	1.1 km	MPC · JPL
498779	2008 UG_{140}	—	October 23, 2008	Kitt Peak	Spacewatch	MRX	970 m	MPC · JPL
498780	2008 UR_{141}	—	October 23, 2008	Kitt Peak	Spacewatch	·	1.7 km	MPC · JPL
498781	2008 UH_{143}	—	October 23, 2008	Kitt Peak	Spacewatch	DOR	2.2 km	MPC · JPL
498782	2008 UJ_{146}	—	October 6, 2008	Kitt Peak	Spacewatch	·	2.4 km	MPC · JPL
498783	2008 UT_{148}	—	September 24, 2008	Mount Lemmon	Mount Lemmon Survey	·	2.3 km	MPC · JPL
498784	2008 UG_{152}	—	October 7, 2008	Kitt Peak	Spacewatch	AGN	1.1 km	MPC · JPL
498785	2008 UF_{158}	—	September 27, 2008	Mount Lemmon	Mount Lemmon Survey	·	2.0 km	MPC · JPL
498786	2008 UC_{164}	—	October 10, 2008	Mount Lemmon	Mount Lemmon Survey	·	2.2 km	MPC · JPL
498787	2008 UJ_{168}	—	October 24, 2008	Kitt Peak	Spacewatch	KOR	1.2 km	MPC · JPL
498788	2008 UP_{169}	—	October 24, 2008	Kitt Peak	Spacewatch	·	1.5 km	MPC · JPL
498789	2008 UC_{171}	—	October 24, 2008	Kitt Peak	Spacewatch	·	610 m	MPC · JPL
498790	2008 UK_{173}	—	October 24, 2008	Kitt Peak	Spacewatch	KOR	1.2 km	MPC · JPL
498791	2008 UM_{181}	—	October 24, 2008	Mount Lemmon	Mount Lemmon Survey	KOR	1.1 km	MPC · JPL
498792	2008 UV_{183}	—	April 2, 2006	Kitt Peak	Spacewatch	KOR	1.5 km	MPC · JPL
498793	2008 UG_{204}	—	October 10, 2008	Catalina	CSS	·	1.8 km	MPC · JPL
498794	2008 UK_{206}	—	October 6, 2008	Mount Lemmon	Mount Lemmon Survey	615	1.5 km	MPC · JPL
498795	2008 UX_{210}	—	October 23, 2008	Kitt Peak	Spacewatch	·	1.4 km	MPC · JPL
498796	2008 UY_{210}	—	October 1, 2008	Mount Lemmon	Mount Lemmon Survey	·	1.8 km	MPC · JPL
498797 Linshiawshin	2008 UB_{212}	Linshiawshin	October 23, 2008	Lulin	Hsiao, X. Y., Q. Ye	(13314)	2.0 km	MPC · JPL
498798	2008 UA_{224}	—	October 25, 2008	Kitt Peak	Spacewatch	·	2.9 km	MPC · JPL
498799	2008 UC_{254}	—	October 2, 2008	Mount Lemmon	Mount Lemmon Survey	·	1.5 km	MPC · JPL
498800	2008 UV_{260}	—	October 6, 2008	Mount Lemmon	Mount Lemmon Survey	·	1.7 km	MPC · JPL

== 498801–498900 ==
back to top

Designation			Discovery			Properties		Ref
Permanent	Provisional	Named after	Date	Site	Discoverer(s)	Category	Diam.	Ref
498801	2008 UY_{260}	—	October 6, 2008	Mount Lemmon	Mount Lemmon Survey	·	1.6 km	MPC · JPL
498802	2008 UU_{266}	—	September 28, 2008	Mount Lemmon	Mount Lemmon Survey	HOF	2.1 km	MPC · JPL
498803	2008 UP_{268}	—	October 28, 2008	Kitt Peak	Spacewatch	KOR	1.2 km	MPC · JPL
498804	2008 UN_{279}	—	October 20, 2008	Kitt Peak	Spacewatch	KOR	1.0 km	MPC · JPL
498805	2008 UE_{285}	—	September 25, 2008	Kitt Peak	Spacewatch	MRX	1.0 km	MPC · JPL
498806	2008 UQ_{285}	—	October 28, 2008	Mount Lemmon	Mount Lemmon Survey	·	2.2 km	MPC · JPL
498807	2008 UM_{288}	—	October 28, 2008	Mount Lemmon	Mount Lemmon Survey	KOR	1.1 km	MPC · JPL
498808	2008 UC_{307}	—	October 22, 2008	Kitt Peak	Spacewatch	·	1.9 km	MPC · JPL
498809	2008 UW_{311}	—	October 8, 2008	Mount Lemmon	Mount Lemmon Survey	·	1.7 km	MPC · JPL
498810	2008 US_{323}	—	October 31, 2008	Catalina	CSS	·	2.0 km	MPC · JPL
498811	2008 UZ_{325}	—	October 24, 2008	Catalina	CSS	GEF	1.4 km	MPC · JPL
498812	2008 UV_{327}	—	October 30, 2008	Mount Lemmon	Mount Lemmon Survey	DOR	2.0 km	MPC · JPL
498813	2008 UK_{329}	—	October 2, 2008	Kitt Peak	Spacewatch	·	1.8 km	MPC · JPL
498814	2008 UT_{342}	—	October 30, 2008	Kitt Peak	Spacewatch	·	1.8 km	MPC · JPL
498815	2008 UY_{344}	—	October 31, 2008	Kitt Peak	Spacewatch	·	1.9 km	MPC · JPL
498816	2008 UL_{347}	—	October 21, 2008	Kitt Peak	Spacewatch	HOF	2.2 km	MPC · JPL
498817	2008 UQ_{349}	—	October 28, 2008	Kitt Peak	Spacewatch	AGN	950 m	MPC · JPL
498818	2008 UD_{350}	—	October 30, 2008	Mount Lemmon	Mount Lemmon Survey	EOS	1.7 km	MPC · JPL
498819	2008 UW_{357}	—	October 25, 2008	Kitt Peak	Spacewatch	·	660 m	MPC · JPL
498820	2008 UO_{362}	—	October 6, 2008	Catalina	CSS	·	2.1 km	MPC · JPL
498821	2008 UQ_{364}	—	October 28, 2008	Catalina	CSS	(32418)	2.3 km	MPC · JPL
498822	2008 VO	—	November 1, 2008	Socorro	LINEAR	·	2.0 km	MPC · JPL
498823	2008 VM_{7}	—	October 7, 2008	Kitt Peak	Spacewatch	KOR	1.0 km	MPC · JPL
498824	2008 VD_{19}	—	June 21, 2007	Mount Lemmon	Mount Lemmon Survey	KOR	1.1 km	MPC · JPL
498825	2008 VP_{23}	—	November 1, 2008	Kitt Peak	Spacewatch	·	1.8 km	MPC · JPL
498826	2008 VO_{24}	—	October 24, 2008	Kitt Peak	Spacewatch	·	1.8 km	MPC · JPL
498827	2008 VC_{39}	—	November 2, 2008	Kitt Peak	Spacewatch	KOR	1.2 km	MPC · JPL
498828	2008 VN_{48}	—	October 26, 2008	Kitt Peak	Spacewatch	·	2.3 km	MPC · JPL
498829	2008 VZ_{78}	—	November 8, 2008	Mount Lemmon	Mount Lemmon Survey	EOS	1.9 km	MPC · JPL
498830	2008 WU_{1}	—	November 18, 2008	Socorro	LINEAR	·	1.8 km	MPC · JPL
498831	2008 WY_{3}	—	September 29, 2008	Kitt Peak	Spacewatch	·	1.8 km	MPC · JPL
498832	2008 WQ_{17}	—	October 8, 2008	Kitt Peak	Spacewatch	·	2.0 km	MPC · JPL
498833	2008 WR_{21}	—	September 29, 2008	Kitt Peak	Spacewatch	·	1.6 km	MPC · JPL
498834	2008 WZ_{22}	—	October 23, 2008	Kitt Peak	Spacewatch	·	1.5 km	MPC · JPL
498835	2008 WW_{30}	—	November 19, 2008	Mount Lemmon	Mount Lemmon Survey	·	1.6 km	MPC · JPL
498836	2008 WZ_{35}	—	October 28, 2008	Kitt Peak	Spacewatch	KOR	1.3 km	MPC · JPL
498837	2008 WF_{36}	—	October 28, 2008	Kitt Peak	Spacewatch	KOR	1.2 km	MPC · JPL
498838	2008 WL_{39}	—	December 20, 2004	Mount Lemmon	Mount Lemmon Survey	·	1.9 km	MPC · JPL
498839	2008 WS_{52}	—	November 1, 2008	Kitt Peak	Spacewatch	·	1.5 km	MPC · JPL
498840	2008 WU_{59}	—	November 20, 2008	Kitt Peak	Spacewatch	·	2.4 km	MPC · JPL
498841	2008 WK_{75}	—	October 25, 2008	Mount Lemmon	Mount Lemmon Survey	·	1.6 km	MPC · JPL
498842	2008 WA_{76}	—	November 20, 2008	Kitt Peak	Spacewatch	·	1.7 km	MPC · JPL
498843	2008 WM_{76}	—	November 20, 2008	Kitt Peak	Spacewatch	KOR	1.2 km	MPC · JPL
498844	2008 WP_{98}	—	November 22, 2008	La Sagra	OAM	·	4.4 km	MPC · JPL
498845	2008 WT_{99}	—	October 6, 2008	Mount Lemmon	Mount Lemmon Survey	·	2.2 km	MPC · JPL
498846	2008 WY_{99}	—	November 8, 2008	Mount Lemmon	Mount Lemmon Survey	HOF	2.2 km	MPC · JPL
498847	2008 WT_{105}	—	November 22, 2008	Kitt Peak	Spacewatch	·	2.1 km	MPC · JPL
498848	2008 WH_{129}	—	November 19, 2008	Mount Lemmon	Mount Lemmon Survey	·	4.3 km	MPC · JPL
498849	2008 WT_{139}	—	November 22, 2008	Socorro	LINEAR	GAL	2.0 km	MPC · JPL
498850	2008 XM_{13}	—	December 3, 2008	Kitt Peak	Spacewatch	·	1.9 km	MPC · JPL
498851	2008 XK_{21}	—	December 1, 2008	Kitt Peak	Spacewatch	KOR	1.3 km	MPC · JPL
498852	2008 XZ_{32}	—	December 2, 2008	Kitt Peak	Spacewatch	AGN	1.1 km	MPC · JPL
498853	2008 XW_{33}	—	November 19, 2008	Kitt Peak	Spacewatch	·	1.6 km	MPC · JPL
498854	2008 XH_{50}	—	December 3, 2008	Mount Lemmon	Mount Lemmon Survey	·	1.7 km	MPC · JPL
498855	2008 XU_{54}	—	December 4, 2008	Mount Lemmon	Mount Lemmon Survey	·	1.7 km	MPC · JPL
498856	2008 YX_{4}	—	December 21, 2008	Piszkéstető	K. Sárneczky	·	2.2 km	MPC · JPL
498857	2008 YD_{21}	—	December 21, 2008	Mount Lemmon	Mount Lemmon Survey	EOS	1.8 km	MPC · JPL
498858	2008 YX_{35}	—	December 22, 2008	Kitt Peak	Spacewatch	·	2.7 km	MPC · JPL
498859	2008 YW_{42}	—	November 19, 2008	Mount Lemmon	Mount Lemmon Survey	·	2.7 km	MPC · JPL
498860	2008 YO_{43}	—	December 29, 2008	Kitt Peak	Spacewatch	AGN	900 m	MPC · JPL
498861	2008 YL_{44}	—	December 5, 2008	Mount Lemmon	Mount Lemmon Survey	·	2.5 km	MPC · JPL
498862	2008 YB_{50}	—	December 21, 2008	Kitt Peak	Spacewatch	·	560 m	MPC · JPL
498863	2008 YF_{52}	—	December 29, 2008	Mount Lemmon	Mount Lemmon Survey	·	2.3 km	MPC · JPL
498864	2008 YJ_{54}	—	December 29, 2008	Mount Lemmon	Mount Lemmon Survey	URS	2.9 km	MPC · JPL
498865	2008 YJ_{56}	—	December 30, 2008	Kitt Peak	Spacewatch	EOS	1.6 km	MPC · JPL
498866	2008 YB_{60}	—	October 7, 2008	Mount Lemmon	Mount Lemmon Survey	·	1.8 km	MPC · JPL
498867	2008 YA_{81}	—	November 24, 2008	Mount Lemmon	Mount Lemmon Survey	·	520 m	MPC · JPL
498868	2008 YD_{82}	—	December 31, 2008	Kitt Peak	Spacewatch	VER	2.2 km	MPC · JPL
498869	2008 YK_{86}	—	November 20, 2008	Mount Lemmon	Mount Lemmon Survey	BRA	1.2 km	MPC · JPL
498870	2008 YW_{90}	—	December 4, 2008	Mount Lemmon	Mount Lemmon Survey	·	1.8 km	MPC · JPL
498871	2008 YG_{92}	—	November 2, 2008	Mount Lemmon	Mount Lemmon Survey	·	2.1 km	MPC · JPL
498872	2008 YZ_{93}	—	December 29, 2008	Kitt Peak	Spacewatch	·	3.0 km	MPC · JPL
498873	2008 YM_{96}	—	December 21, 2008	Mount Lemmon	Mount Lemmon Survey	·	3.0 km	MPC · JPL
498874	2008 YZ_{98}	—	December 7, 2008	Mount Lemmon	Mount Lemmon Survey	·	2.2 km	MPC · JPL
498875	2008 YZ_{99}	—	December 29, 2008	Kitt Peak	Spacewatch	·	720 m	MPC · JPL
498876	2008 YD_{100}	—	December 21, 2008	Mount Lemmon	Mount Lemmon Survey	·	2.0 km	MPC · JPL
498877	2008 YD_{102}	—	December 29, 2008	Kitt Peak	Spacewatch	EMA	3.3 km	MPC · JPL
498878	2008 YS_{102}	—	December 29, 2008	Kitt Peak	Spacewatch	·	2.6 km	MPC · JPL
498879	2008 YL_{107}	—	December 21, 2008	Mount Lemmon	Mount Lemmon Survey	·	2.6 km	MPC · JPL
498880	2008 YP_{108}	—	December 29, 2008	Kitt Peak	Spacewatch	·	2.3 km	MPC · JPL
498881	2008 YD_{110}	—	December 2, 2008	Mount Lemmon	Mount Lemmon Survey	·	2.9 km	MPC · JPL
498882	2008 YR_{114}	—	November 8, 2008	Mount Lemmon	Mount Lemmon Survey	·	1.7 km	MPC · JPL
498883	2008 YK_{118}	—	December 22, 2008	Kitt Peak	Spacewatch	EOS	1.7 km	MPC · JPL
498884	2008 YC_{120}	—	December 22, 2008	Kitt Peak	Spacewatch	EOS	1.6 km	MPC · JPL
498885	2008 YW_{122}	—	December 30, 2008	Kitt Peak	Spacewatch	·	1.5 km	MPC · JPL
498886	2008 YA_{124}	—	December 4, 2008	Mount Lemmon	Mount Lemmon Survey	·	2.1 km	MPC · JPL
498887	2008 YX_{126}	—	December 30, 2008	Kitt Peak	Spacewatch	·	4.3 km	MPC · JPL
498888	2008 YW_{132}	—	December 31, 2008	Kitt Peak	Spacewatch	·	2.2 km	MPC · JPL
498889	2008 YL_{133}	—	December 29, 2008	Mount Lemmon	Mount Lemmon Survey	·	760 m	MPC · JPL
498890	2008 YS_{137}	—	December 30, 2008	Mount Lemmon	Mount Lemmon Survey	·	2.7 km	MPC · JPL
498891	2008 YQ_{143}	—	December 30, 2008	Kitt Peak	Spacewatch	·	3.0 km	MPC · JPL
498892	2008 YB_{144}	—	December 22, 2008	Mount Lemmon	Mount Lemmon Survey	EOS	1.8 km	MPC · JPL
498893	2008 YG_{148}	—	December 31, 2008	Kitt Peak	Spacewatch	EOS	1.6 km	MPC · JPL
498894	2008 YN_{150}	—	December 22, 2008	Kitt Peak	Spacewatch	·	1.3 km	MPC · JPL
498895	2008 YG_{151}	—	December 22, 2008	Kitt Peak	Spacewatch	·	1.7 km	MPC · JPL
498896	2008 YX_{154}	—	December 22, 2008	Mount Lemmon	Mount Lemmon Survey	EOS	1.7 km	MPC · JPL
498897	2008 YY_{158}	—	December 30, 2008	Mount Lemmon	Mount Lemmon Survey	·	2.6 km	MPC · JPL
498898	2008 YB_{171}	—	December 19, 2008	Socorro	LINEAR	(7605)	4.6 km	MPC · JPL
498899	2008 YX_{172}	—	December 30, 2008	Mount Lemmon	Mount Lemmon Survey	·	2.5 km	MPC · JPL
498900	2009 AC	—	December 22, 2008	Kitt Peak	Spacewatch	TIR	2.9 km	MPC · JPL

== 498901–499000 ==
back to top

Designation			Discovery			Properties		Ref
Permanent	Provisional	Named after	Date	Site	Discoverer(s)	Category	Diam.	Ref
498901	2009 AU_{1}	—	December 30, 2008	Catalina	CSS	T_{j} (2.6)	6.5 km	MPC · JPL
498902	2009 AT_{6}	—	January 1, 2009	Kitt Peak	Spacewatch	·	1.5 km	MPC · JPL
498903	2009 AN_{9}	—	December 5, 2008	Mount Lemmon	Mount Lemmon Survey	·	2.1 km	MPC · JPL
498904	2009 AU_{11}	—	January 2, 2009	Mount Lemmon	Mount Lemmon Survey	·	3.0 km	MPC · JPL
498905	2009 AS_{12}	—	January 2, 2009	Mount Lemmon	Mount Lemmon Survey	·	2.0 km	MPC · JPL
498906	2009 AE_{20}	—	December 22, 2008	Kitt Peak	Spacewatch	·	1.7 km	MPC · JPL
498907	2009 AA_{21}	—	January 2, 2009	Mount Lemmon	Mount Lemmon Survey	·	2.5 km	MPC · JPL
498908	2009 AW_{23}	—	December 30, 2008	Mount Lemmon	Mount Lemmon Survey	EOS	2.1 km	MPC · JPL
498909	2009 AV_{25}	—	January 2, 2009	Kitt Peak	Spacewatch	·	2.6 km	MPC · JPL
498910	2009 AS_{30}	—	January 15, 2009	Kitt Peak	Spacewatch	·	3.0 km	MPC · JPL
498911	2009 AQ_{33}	—	December 29, 2008	Mount Lemmon	Mount Lemmon Survey	EOS	2.1 km	MPC · JPL
498912	2009 AK_{34}	—	December 6, 2008	Kitt Peak	Spacewatch	EOS	1.7 km	MPC · JPL
498913	2009 AH_{36}	—	January 15, 2009	Kitt Peak	Spacewatch	·	790 m	MPC · JPL
498914	2009 AS_{39}	—	January 15, 2009	Kitt Peak	Spacewatch	·	3.2 km	MPC · JPL
498915	2009 AB_{43}	—	January 3, 2009	Mount Lemmon	Mount Lemmon Survey	·	3.5 km	MPC · JPL
498916	2009 AW_{46}	—	January 1, 2009	Mount Lemmon	Mount Lemmon Survey	·	1.5 km	MPC · JPL
498917	2009 AX_{48}	—	January 7, 2009	Kitt Peak	Spacewatch	·	2.0 km	MPC · JPL
498918	2009 BF	—	January 16, 2009	Mount Lemmon	Mount Lemmon Survey	AMO	640 m	MPC · JPL
498919	2009 BZ_{9}	—	November 24, 2008	Mount Lemmon	Mount Lemmon Survey	·	830 m	MPC · JPL
498920	2009 BO_{14}	—	December 1, 2008	Mount Lemmon	Mount Lemmon Survey	·	4.7 km	MPC · JPL
498921	2009 BN_{15}	—	December 21, 2008	Kitt Peak	Spacewatch	·	1.8 km	MPC · JPL
498922	2009 BR_{18}	—	January 16, 2009	Kitt Peak	Spacewatch	·	3.2 km	MPC · JPL
498923	2009 BT_{19}	—	December 22, 2008	Kitt Peak	Spacewatch	·	2.4 km	MPC · JPL
498924	2009 BV_{22}	—	January 1, 2009	Mount Lemmon	Mount Lemmon Survey	·	2.7 km	MPC · JPL
498925	2009 BT_{23}	—	December 22, 2008	Mount Lemmon	Mount Lemmon Survey	EOS	1.4 km	MPC · JPL
498926	2009 BW_{27}	—	December 22, 2008	Kitt Peak	Spacewatch	·	2.7 km	MPC · JPL
498927	2009 BD_{30}	—	January 16, 2009	Kitt Peak	Spacewatch	·	930 m	MPC · JPL
498928	2009 BP_{32}	—	October 8, 2007	Catalina	CSS	·	1.8 km	MPC · JPL
498929	2009 BB_{33}	—	January 2, 2009	Mount Lemmon	Mount Lemmon Survey	·	670 m	MPC · JPL
498930	2009 BY_{35}	—	January 1, 2009	Mount Lemmon	Mount Lemmon Survey	·	1.9 km	MPC · JPL
498931	2009 BE_{37}	—	January 16, 2009	Kitt Peak	Spacewatch	·	600 m	MPC · JPL
498932	2009 BF_{37}	—	January 1, 2009	Mount Lemmon	Mount Lemmon Survey	·	3.4 km	MPC · JPL
498933	2009 BQ_{37}	—	January 16, 2009	Kitt Peak	Spacewatch	·	550 m	MPC · JPL
498934	2009 BJ_{38}	—	January 16, 2009	Kitt Peak	Spacewatch	·	1.5 km	MPC · JPL
498935	2009 BL_{38}	—	January 16, 2009	Kitt Peak	Spacewatch	VER	2.3 km	MPC · JPL
498936	2009 BH_{39}	—	December 30, 2008	Mount Lemmon	Mount Lemmon Survey	V	660 m	MPC · JPL
498937	2009 BV_{43}	—	January 16, 2009	Kitt Peak	Spacewatch	·	2.3 km	MPC · JPL
498938	2009 BS_{44}	—	December 7, 2008	Mount Lemmon	Mount Lemmon Survey	·	3.7 km	MPC · JPL
498939	2009 BZ_{47}	—	January 2, 2009	Mount Lemmon	Mount Lemmon Survey	·	2.6 km	MPC · JPL
498940	2009 BC_{48}	—	December 21, 2008	Kitt Peak	Spacewatch	·	3.7 km	MPC · JPL
498941	2009 BK_{50}	—	December 22, 2008	Mount Lemmon	Mount Lemmon Survey	·	610 m	MPC · JPL
498942	2009 BY_{51}	—	December 22, 2008	Kitt Peak	Spacewatch	·	2.2 km	MPC · JPL
498943	2009 BN_{52}	—	January 16, 2009	Kitt Peak	Spacewatch	·	2.8 km	MPC · JPL
498944	2009 BU_{53}	—	January 1, 2009	Mount Lemmon	Mount Lemmon Survey	AEG	2.4 km	MPC · JPL
498945	2009 BY_{58}	—	November 2, 2008	Mount Lemmon	Mount Lemmon Survey	·	2.6 km	MPC · JPL
498946	2009 BJ_{61}	—	January 18, 2009	Mount Lemmon	Mount Lemmon Survey	HYG	2.0 km	MPC · JPL
498947	2009 BU_{61}	—	January 18, 2009	Mount Lemmon	Mount Lemmon Survey	NYS	770 m	MPC · JPL
498948	2009 BF_{62}	—	January 18, 2009	Kitt Peak	Spacewatch	·	3.5 km	MPC · JPL
498949	2009 BD_{70}	—	January 25, 2009	Catalina	CSS	·	2.8 km	MPC · JPL
498950	2009 BQ_{71}	—	January 22, 2009	Dauban	Kugel, F.	·	4.4 km	MPC · JPL
498951	2009 BC_{77}	—	December 21, 2008	Mount Lemmon	Mount Lemmon Survey	EOS	1.8 km	MPC · JPL
498952	2009 BG_{84}	—	January 2, 2009	Mount Lemmon	Mount Lemmon Survey	·	1.7 km	MPC · JPL
498953	2009 BK_{85}	—	January 25, 2009	Kitt Peak	Spacewatch	·	1.7 km	MPC · JPL
498954	2009 BG_{87}	—	January 25, 2009	Kitt Peak	Spacewatch	·	490 m	MPC · JPL
498955	2009 BR_{87}	—	January 15, 2009	Kitt Peak	Spacewatch	·	1.4 km	MPC · JPL
498956	2009 BT_{87}	—	January 15, 2009	Kitt Peak	Spacewatch	·	3.1 km	MPC · JPL
498957	2009 BK_{89}	—	December 30, 2008	Mount Lemmon	Mount Lemmon Survey	EOS	1.7 km	MPC · JPL
498958	2009 BM_{90}	—	January 25, 2009	Kitt Peak	Spacewatch	EOS	1.9 km	MPC · JPL
498959	2009 BN_{94}	—	January 1, 2009	Mount Lemmon	Mount Lemmon Survey	·	2.7 km	MPC · JPL
498960	2009 BQ_{94}	—	January 25, 2009	Kitt Peak	Spacewatch	·	2.4 km	MPC · JPL
498961	2009 BM_{100}	—	January 15, 2009	Kitt Peak	Spacewatch	·	580 m	MPC · JPL
498962	2009 BM_{104}	—	January 20, 2009	Kitt Peak	Spacewatch	EOS	4.0 km	MPC · JPL
498963	2009 BL_{107}	—	January 29, 2009	Kitt Peak	Spacewatch	·	2.7 km	MPC · JPL
498964	2009 BZ_{110}	—	January 20, 2009	Kitt Peak	Spacewatch	·	540 m	MPC · JPL
498965	2009 BH_{115}	—	November 24, 2008	Mount Lemmon	Mount Lemmon Survey	EOS	1.6 km	MPC · JPL
498966	2009 BY_{116}	—	October 9, 2007	Mount Lemmon	Mount Lemmon Survey	·	1.7 km	MPC · JPL
498967	2009 BK_{122}	—	January 20, 2009	Kitt Peak	Spacewatch	·	3.0 km	MPC · JPL
498968	2009 BE_{127}	—	January 29, 2009	Kitt Peak	Spacewatch	EOS	1.4 km	MPC · JPL
498969	2009 BG_{129}	—	January 30, 2009	Mount Lemmon	Mount Lemmon Survey	·	2.9 km	MPC · JPL
498970	2009 BP_{133}	—	December 22, 2008	Kitt Peak	Spacewatch	EOS	1.9 km	MPC · JPL
498971	2009 BW_{133}	—	January 2, 2009	Mount Lemmon	Mount Lemmon Survey	·	1.8 km	MPC · JPL
498972	2009 BE_{134}	—	January 29, 2009	Kitt Peak	Spacewatch	·	1.7 km	MPC · JPL
498973	2009 BK_{137}	—	January 29, 2009	Kitt Peak	Spacewatch	·	1.6 km	MPC · JPL
498974	2009 BW_{139}	—	August 19, 2006	Kitt Peak	Spacewatch	·	3.0 km	MPC · JPL
498975	2009 BM_{140}	—	January 3, 2009	Mount Lemmon	Mount Lemmon Survey	TEL	930 m	MPC · JPL
498976	2009 BX_{143}	—	January 16, 2009	Kitt Peak	Spacewatch	·	2.9 km	MPC · JPL
498977	2009 BG_{144}	—	January 30, 2009	Kitt Peak	Spacewatch	·	1.4 km	MPC · JPL
498978	2009 BX_{144}	—	January 16, 2009	Kitt Peak	Spacewatch	·	1.8 km	MPC · JPL
498979	2009 BL_{146}	—	January 30, 2009	Mount Lemmon	Mount Lemmon Survey	·	2.4 km	MPC · JPL
498980	2009 BB_{149}	—	January 20, 2009	Kitt Peak	Spacewatch	·	2.6 km	MPC · JPL
498981	2009 BE_{154}	—	January 2, 2009	Mount Lemmon	Mount Lemmon Survey	EOS	1.5 km	MPC · JPL
498982	2009 BH_{154}	—	December 29, 2008	Mount Lemmon	Mount Lemmon Survey	EOS	1.6 km	MPC · JPL
498983	2009 BJ_{157}	—	January 31, 2009	Kitt Peak	Spacewatch	·	610 m	MPC · JPL
498984	2009 BQ_{159}	—	January 31, 2009	Kitt Peak	Spacewatch	·	1.9 km	MPC · JPL
498985	2009 BE_{164}	—	January 31, 2009	Kitt Peak	Spacewatch	KOR	1.3 km	MPC · JPL
498986	2009 BZ_{166}	—	January 25, 2009	Kitt Peak	Spacewatch	PHO	610 m	MPC · JPL
498987	2009 BA_{167}	—	January 20, 2009	Kitt Peak	Spacewatch	·	670 m	MPC · JPL
498988	2009 BD_{170}	—	January 16, 2009	Kitt Peak	Spacewatch	H	360 m	MPC · JPL
498989	2009 BD_{171}	—	January 17, 2009	Mount Lemmon	Mount Lemmon Survey	EOS	1.5 km	MPC · JPL
498990	2009 BC_{172}	—	January 18, 2009	Mount Lemmon	Mount Lemmon Survey	·	2.1 km	MPC · JPL
498991	2009 BH_{174}	—	January 25, 2009	Catalina	CSS	H	440 m	MPC · JPL
498992	2009 BT_{174}	—	January 25, 2009	Kitt Peak	Spacewatch	HYG	2.4 km	MPC · JPL
498993	2009 BZ_{175}	—	January 31, 2009	Mount Lemmon	Mount Lemmon Survey	T_{j} (2.95)	4.6 km	MPC · JPL
498994	2009 BV_{176}	—	January 16, 2009	Kitt Peak	Spacewatch	·	480 m	MPC · JPL
498995	2009 BF_{177}	—	January 28, 2009	Catalina	CSS	·	3.0 km	MPC · JPL
498996	2009 BK_{177}	—	January 29, 2009	Mount Lemmon	Mount Lemmon Survey	·	2.5 km	MPC · JPL
498997	2009 BR_{180}	—	January 30, 2009	Kitt Peak	Spacewatch	HYG	2.4 km	MPC · JPL
498998	2009 BT_{183}	—	January 18, 2009	Catalina	CSS	·	2.9 km	MPC · JPL
498999	2009 CG_{8}	—	December 21, 2008	Kitt Peak	Spacewatch	·	1.7 km	MPC · JPL
499000	2009 CF_{15}	—	December 30, 2008	Mount Lemmon	Mount Lemmon Survey	·	2.8 km	MPC · JPL

back to top

== Meaning of names ==
As minor planet discoveries are confirmed, they are given a permanent number by the IAU's Minor Planet Center (MPC), and the discoverers can then submit names for them, following the IAU's naming conventions. The list below concerns those minor planets in the specified number-range that have received names, and explains the meanings of those names.

Official naming citations of newly named small Solar System bodies are approved and published in a bulletin by IAU's Working Group for Small Bodies Nomenclature (WGSBN). Before May 2021, citations were published in MPC's Minor Planet Circulars for many decades. Recent citations can also be found on the JPL Small-Body Database (SBDB). Until his death in 2016, German astronomer Lutz D. Schmadel compiled these citations into the Dictionary of Minor Planet Names (DMP) and regularly updated the collection.

Based on Paul Herget's The Names of the Minor Planets, Schmadel also researched the unclear origin of numerous asteroids, most of which had been named prior to World War II. This article incorporates text from this source, which is in the public domain: SBDB New namings may only be added to this list below after official publication as the preannouncement of names is condemned. The WGSBN publishes a comprehensive guideline for the naming rules of non-cometary small Solar System bodies.

Named minor planet	Provisional	This minor planet was named for...	Ref · Catalog
498394 Zhangbosheng	2007 XV_{29}	Zhang Bosheng (1903–1994), Chinese geologist, educator and philosopher.	JPL · 498394
498797 Linshiawshin	2008 UB_{212}	Lin Shiaw-shin (1944–2015) was the founder of Taiwan Science Monthly magazine.	JPL · 498797
