= List of minor planets: 406001–407000 =

The following is a partial list of minor planets, running from minor-planet number 406001 through 407000, inclusive. The primary data for this and other partial lists is based on JPL's "Small-Body Orbital Elements" and data available from the Minor Planet Center. Critical list information is also provided by the MPC, unless otherwise specified from Lowell Observatory. A detailed description of the table's columns and additional sources are given on the main page including a complete list of every page in this series, and a statistical break-up on the dynamical classification of minor planets.

Also see the summary list of all named bodies in numerical and alphabetical order, and the corresponding naming citations for the number range of this particular list. New namings may only be added to this list after official publication, as the preannouncement of names is condemned by the Working Group for Small Bodies Nomenclature of the International Astronomical Union.

Near-Earth obj.	MBA (inner)	MBA (outer)	Centaur
Mars-crosser	MBA (middle)	Jupiter trojan	Trans-Neptunian obj.
Unclassified

== 406001–406100 ==
Designation			Discovery			Properties		Ref
Permanent	Provisional	Named after	Date	Site	Discoverer(s)	Category	Diam.	Ref
406001	2006 SN_{358}	—	September 14, 2006	Kitt Peak	Spacewatch	·	1.2 km	MPC · JPL
406002	2006 SH_{359}	—	September 30, 2006	Catalina	CSS	·	1.5 km	MPC · JPL
406003	2006 SM_{363}	—	September 30, 2006	Mount Lemmon	Mount Lemmon Survey	·	930 m	MPC · JPL
406004	2006 SS_{365}	—	September 30, 2006	Mount Lemmon	Mount Lemmon Survey	·	1.1 km	MPC · JPL
406005	2006 SP_{366}	—	September 17, 2006	Kitt Peak	Spacewatch	·	1.1 km	MPC · JPL
406006 Ralys	2006 SA_{368}	Ralys	September 23, 2006	Moletai	K. Černis	MAR	950 m	MPC · JPL
406007	2006 SJ_{368}	—	September 25, 2006	Kitt Peak	Spacewatch	(5)	1.2 km	MPC · JPL
406008	2006 SP_{398}	—	September 16, 2006	Catalina	CSS	·	1.3 km	MPC · JPL
406009	2006 SG_{401}	—	September 27, 2006	Mount Lemmon	Mount Lemmon Survey	·	1.8 km	MPC · JPL
406010	2006 SX_{404}	—	September 17, 2006	Kitt Peak	Spacewatch	·	1.6 km	MPC · JPL
406011	2006 TK_{5}	—	October 2, 2006	Catalina	CSS	H	700 m	MPC · JPL
406012	2006 TP_{10}	—	October 14, 2006	Piszkéstető	K. Sárneczky, Kuli, Z.	·	1.4 km	MPC · JPL
406013	2006 TW_{20}	—	October 11, 2006	Kitt Peak	Spacewatch	(5)	1.1 km	MPC · JPL
406014	2006 TX_{26}	—	October 12, 2006	Kitt Peak	Spacewatch	(5)	990 m	MPC · JPL
406015	2006 TN_{35}	—	September 30, 2006	Mount Lemmon	Mount Lemmon Survey	·	2.2 km	MPC · JPL
406016	2006 TQ_{36}	—	October 12, 2006	Kitt Peak	Spacewatch	·	1.1 km	MPC · JPL
406017	2006 TQ_{43}	—	October 12, 2006	Kitt Peak	Spacewatch	·	1.3 km	MPC · JPL
406018	2006 TZ_{44}	—	September 30, 2006	Mount Lemmon	Mount Lemmon Survey	·	2.2 km	MPC · JPL
406019	2006 TU_{45}	—	September 30, 2006	Mount Lemmon	Mount Lemmon Survey	·	2.0 km	MPC · JPL
406020	2006 TM_{47}	—	October 12, 2006	Kitt Peak	Spacewatch	·	980 m	MPC · JPL
406021	2006 TZ_{52}	—	October 12, 2006	Kitt Peak	Spacewatch	·	1.3 km	MPC · JPL
406022	2006 TP_{54}	—	October 12, 2006	Palomar	NEAT	·	2.0 km	MPC · JPL
406023	2006 TN_{62}	—	October 10, 2006	Palomar	NEAT	·	940 m	MPC · JPL
406024	2006 TR_{63}	—	October 10, 2006	Palomar	NEAT	·	1.1 km	MPC · JPL
406025	2006 TX_{68}	—	October 11, 2006	Palomar	NEAT	(5)	1 km	MPC · JPL
406026	2006 TL_{69}	—	October 11, 2006	Palomar	NEAT	·	2.3 km	MPC · JPL
406027	2006 TT_{75}	—	October 11, 2006	Palomar	NEAT	·	1.4 km	MPC · JPL
406028	2006 TM_{77}	—	October 12, 2006	Palomar	NEAT	·	990 m	MPC · JPL
406029	2006 TY_{85}	—	October 2, 2006	Mount Lemmon	Mount Lemmon Survey	·	1.5 km	MPC · JPL
406030	2006 TP_{88}	—	October 2, 2006	Mount Lemmon	Mount Lemmon Survey	·	1.8 km	MPC · JPL
406031	2006 TA_{89}	—	October 13, 2006	Kitt Peak	Spacewatch	EUN	1.2 km	MPC · JPL
406032	2006 TB_{90}	—	October 13, 2006	Kitt Peak	Spacewatch	·	1.7 km	MPC · JPL
406033	2006 TF_{90}	—	October 13, 2006	Kitt Peak	Spacewatch	(5)	950 m	MPC · JPL
406034	2006 TC_{91}	—	October 13, 2006	Kitt Peak	Spacewatch	·	1.3 km	MPC · JPL
406035	2006 TV_{91}	—	October 13, 2006	Kitt Peak	Spacewatch	·	1.4 km	MPC · JPL
406036	2006 TM_{92}	—	October 14, 2006	Lulin	Lin, C.-S., Q. Ye	·	1.1 km	MPC · JPL
406037	2006 TA_{93}	—	October 15, 2006	Kitt Peak	Spacewatch	(5)	1.2 km	MPC · JPL
406038	2006 TG_{94}	—	September 14, 2006	Kitt Peak	Spacewatch	·	1.1 km	MPC · JPL
406039	2006 TD_{97}	—	October 12, 2006	Palomar	NEAT	(5)	1.1 km	MPC · JPL
406040	2006 TA_{105}	—	October 2, 2006	Mount Lemmon	Mount Lemmon Survey	·	2.0 km	MPC · JPL
406041	2006 TD_{106}	—	October 15, 2006	Kitt Peak	Spacewatch	·	3.2 km	MPC · JPL
406042	2006 TR_{109}	—	October 10, 2006	Palomar	NEAT	·	1.6 km	MPC · JPL
406043	2006 TU_{119}	—	October 11, 2006	Apache Point	A. C. Becker	·	1.5 km	MPC · JPL
406044	2006 TX_{124}	—	October 4, 2006	Mount Lemmon	Mount Lemmon Survey	(5)	1.0 km	MPC · JPL
406045	2006 UY_{2}	—	October 16, 2006	Catalina	CSS	3:2 · SHU	6.3 km	MPC · JPL
406046	2006 UQ_{5}	—	October 16, 2006	Catalina	CSS	MIS	2.4 km	MPC · JPL
406047	2006 UQ_{7}	—	October 16, 2006	Catalina	CSS	·	1.3 km	MPC · JPL
406048	2006 UA_{9}	—	October 16, 2006	Catalina	CSS	·	1.7 km	MPC · JPL
406049	2006 UH_{10}	—	October 17, 2006	Kitt Peak	Spacewatch	·	1.1 km	MPC · JPL
406050	2006 UN_{16}	—	October 17, 2006	Mount Lemmon	Mount Lemmon Survey	ADE	2.2 km	MPC · JPL
406051	2006 US_{21}	—	October 16, 2006	Kitt Peak	Spacewatch	·	1.1 km	MPC · JPL
406052	2006 UA_{25}	—	October 16, 2006	Kitt Peak	Spacewatch	·	930 m	MPC · JPL
406053	2006 UJ_{31}	—	September 27, 2006	Mount Lemmon	Mount Lemmon Survey	·	1.4 km	MPC · JPL
406054	2006 UK_{31}	—	October 16, 2006	Kitt Peak	Spacewatch	·	950 m	MPC · JPL
406055	2006 UL_{31}	—	October 16, 2006	Kitt Peak	Spacewatch	·	1.0 km	MPC · JPL
406056	2006 UC_{34}	—	October 16, 2006	Kitt Peak	Spacewatch	·	1.3 km	MPC · JPL
406057	2006 US_{34}	—	October 16, 2006	Kitt Peak	Spacewatch	·	740 m	MPC · JPL
406058	2006 UU_{38}	—	October 16, 2006	Kitt Peak	Spacewatch	(29841)	1.2 km	MPC · JPL
406059	2006 UB_{50}	—	October 17, 2006	Kitt Peak	Spacewatch	·	1.2 km	MPC · JPL
406060	2006 UW_{53}	—	October 17, 2006	Mount Lemmon	Mount Lemmon Survey	·	1.3 km	MPC · JPL
406061	2006 UK_{61}	—	October 19, 2006	Mount Lemmon	Mount Lemmon Survey	ADE	2.6 km	MPC · JPL
406062	2006 UH_{63}	—	October 20, 2006	Mount Nyukasa	Japan Aerospace Exploration Agency	(5)	1.0 km	MPC · JPL
406063	2006 UM_{73}	—	October 17, 2006	Kitt Peak	Spacewatch	·	780 m	MPC · JPL
406064	2006 UZ_{77}	—	October 17, 2006	Kitt Peak	Spacewatch	(5)	1.1 km	MPC · JPL
406065	2006 UH_{79}	—	October 17, 2006	Kitt Peak	Spacewatch	·	980 m	MPC · JPL
406066	2006 UD_{81}	—	October 2, 2006	Mount Lemmon	Mount Lemmon Survey	·	1.3 km	MPC · JPL
406067	2006 UP_{85}	—	October 17, 2006	Kitt Peak	Spacewatch	ADE	2.0 km	MPC · JPL
406068	2006 UT_{85}	—	October 17, 2006	Kitt Peak	Spacewatch	·	1.2 km	MPC · JPL
406069	2006 UM_{93}	—	October 2, 2006	Mount Lemmon	Mount Lemmon Survey	·	1.3 km	MPC · JPL
406070	2006 UR_{94}	—	October 18, 2006	Kitt Peak	Spacewatch	·	860 m	MPC · JPL
406071	2006 UN_{96}	—	October 18, 2006	Kitt Peak	Spacewatch	·	1.4 km	MPC · JPL
406072	2006 UR_{108}	—	October 18, 2006	Kitt Peak	Spacewatch	KON	1.7 km	MPC · JPL
406073	2006 UB_{116}	—	September 24, 2006	Kitt Peak	Spacewatch	·	1.0 km	MPC · JPL
406074	2006 UO_{117}	—	October 19, 2006	Kitt Peak	Spacewatch	·	1.6 km	MPC · JPL
406075	2006 UJ_{119}	—	October 19, 2006	Kitt Peak	Spacewatch	·	2.0 km	MPC · JPL
406076	2006 UC_{123}	—	October 19, 2006	Kitt Peak	Spacewatch	EUN	1.1 km	MPC · JPL
406077	2006 UN_{125}	—	October 2, 2006	Mount Lemmon	Mount Lemmon Survey	·	1.5 km	MPC · JPL
406078	2006 UV_{127}	—	October 2, 2006	Mount Lemmon	Mount Lemmon Survey	(5)	930 m	MPC · JPL
406079	2006 UR_{128}	—	September 28, 2006	Mount Lemmon	Mount Lemmon Survey	·	1.3 km	MPC · JPL
406080	2006 UU_{135}	—	October 19, 2006	Kitt Peak	Spacewatch	(5)	1.0 km	MPC · JPL
406081	2006 UK_{143}	—	October 19, 2006	Palomar	NEAT	·	1.1 km	MPC · JPL
406082	2006 UM_{144}	—	October 19, 2006	Kitt Peak	Spacewatch	·	2.0 km	MPC · JPL
406083	2006 US_{149}	—	October 20, 2006	Catalina	CSS	·	2.6 km	MPC · JPL
406084	2006 UQ_{174}	—	October 19, 2006	Mount Lemmon	Mount Lemmon Survey	·	2.1 km	MPC · JPL
406085	2006 UL_{180}	—	October 16, 2006	Catalina	CSS	·	1.3 km	MPC · JPL
406086	2006 UA_{182}	—	October 16, 2006	Catalina	CSS	·	1.8 km	MPC · JPL
406087	2006 US_{187}	—	October 19, 2006	Catalina	CSS	·	1.8 km	MPC · JPL
406088	2006 UP_{188}	—	October 19, 2006	Catalina	CSS	·	1.5 km	MPC · JPL
406089	2006 UQ_{194}	—	October 4, 2006	Mount Lemmon	Mount Lemmon Survey	·	1.2 km	MPC · JPL
406090	2006 UQ_{203}	—	October 22, 2006	Palomar	NEAT	ADE	2.3 km	MPC · JPL
406091	2006 UJ_{245}	—	September 26, 2006	Mount Lemmon	Mount Lemmon Survey	·	1.3 km	MPC · JPL
406092	2006 UN_{255}	—	October 27, 2006	Mount Lemmon	Mount Lemmon Survey	·	1.1 km	MPC · JPL
406093	2006 UD_{259}	—	October 28, 2006	Mount Lemmon	Mount Lemmon Survey	(5)	1.7 km	MPC · JPL
406094	2006 UK_{263}	—	October 4, 2006	Mount Lemmon	Mount Lemmon Survey	EUN	1.4 km	MPC · JPL
406095	2006 UY_{268}	—	October 27, 2006	Mount Lemmon	Mount Lemmon Survey	·	1.1 km	MPC · JPL
406096	2006 UE_{271}	—	October 19, 2006	Mount Lemmon	Mount Lemmon Survey	·	1.5 km	MPC · JPL
406097	2006 UX_{276}	—	September 28, 2006	Mount Lemmon	Mount Lemmon Survey	·	1.0 km	MPC · JPL
406098	2006 UY_{281}	—	October 12, 2006	Kitt Peak	Spacewatch	·	1.5 km	MPC · JPL
406099	2006 UW_{286}	—	October 28, 2006	Kitt Peak	Spacewatch	·	1.3 km	MPC · JPL
406100	2006 UM_{313}	—	October 19, 2006	Kitt Peak	M. W. Buie	·	1.2 km	MPC · JPL

== 406101–406200 ==
back to top

Designation			Discovery			Properties		Ref
Permanent	Provisional	Named after	Date	Site	Discoverer(s)	Category	Diam.	Ref
406101	2006 UJ_{335}	—	October 16, 2006	Kitt Peak	Spacewatch	·	1.0 km	MPC · JPL
406102	2006 VV_{3}	—	November 9, 2006	Kitt Peak	Spacewatch	·	1.1 km	MPC · JPL
406103	2006 VR_{4}	—	November 9, 2006	Kitt Peak	Spacewatch	·	960 m	MPC · JPL
406104	2006 VZ_{7}	—	November 10, 2006	Kitt Peak	Spacewatch	·	1.1 km	MPC · JPL
406105	2006 VQ_{9}	—	November 11, 2006	Catalina	CSS	(5)	1.2 km	MPC · JPL
406106	2006 VW_{9}	—	November 11, 2006	Mount Lemmon	Mount Lemmon Survey	·	1.4 km	MPC · JPL
406107	2006 VB_{10}	—	November 11, 2006	Catalina	CSS	·	2.0 km	MPC · JPL
406108	2006 VU_{10}	—	November 11, 2006	Catalina	CSS	·	1.5 km	MPC · JPL
406109	2006 VX_{22}	—	November 10, 2006	Kitt Peak	Spacewatch	·	1.1 km	MPC · JPL
406110	2006 VW_{27}	—	November 10, 2006	Kitt Peak	Spacewatch	·	1.9 km	MPC · JPL
406111	2006 VQ_{29}	—	November 10, 2006	Kitt Peak	Spacewatch	·	1.5 km	MPC · JPL
406112	2006 VR_{33}	—	November 11, 2006	Mount Lemmon	Mount Lemmon Survey	·	1.9 km	MPC · JPL
406113	2006 VZ_{36}	—	October 4, 2006	Mount Lemmon	Mount Lemmon Survey	·	1.5 km	MPC · JPL
406114	2006 VF_{42}	—	October 22, 2006	Kitt Peak	Spacewatch	·	1.1 km	MPC · JPL
406115	2006 VP_{43}	—	November 13, 2006	Mount Lemmon	Mount Lemmon Survey	·	2.5 km	MPC · JPL
406116	2006 VX_{43}	—	September 28, 2006	Mount Lemmon	Mount Lemmon Survey	·	1.1 km	MPC · JPL
406117	2006 VB_{50}	—	November 10, 2006	Kitt Peak	Spacewatch	EUN	1.6 km	MPC · JPL
406118	2006 VM_{52}	—	November 11, 2006	Kitt Peak	Spacewatch	·	1.7 km	MPC · JPL
406119	2006 VY_{52}	—	November 11, 2006	Kitt Peak	Spacewatch	·	1.5 km	MPC · JPL
406120	2006 VP_{58}	—	November 11, 2006	Kitt Peak	Spacewatch	·	1.4 km	MPC · JPL
406121	2006 VB_{60}	—	November 11, 2006	Kitt Peak	Spacewatch	·	1.5 km	MPC · JPL
406122	2006 VP_{62}	—	November 11, 2006	Kitt Peak	Spacewatch	·	1.3 km	MPC · JPL
406123	2006 VU_{62}	—	November 11, 2006	Kitt Peak	Spacewatch	·	1.0 km	MPC · JPL
406124	2006 VT_{64}	—	September 27, 2006	Mount Lemmon	Mount Lemmon Survey	·	1.1 km	MPC · JPL
406125	2006 VP_{65}	—	September 27, 2006	Mount Lemmon	Mount Lemmon Survey	(5)	1.0 km	MPC · JPL
406126	2006 VC_{70}	—	October 31, 2006	Mount Lemmon	Mount Lemmon Survey	(5)	1.5 km	MPC · JPL
406127	2006 VR_{82}	—	November 13, 2006	Kitt Peak	Spacewatch	·	1.5 km	MPC · JPL
406128	2006 VT_{82}	—	November 13, 2006	Kitt Peak	Spacewatch	·	1.5 km	MPC · JPL
406129	2006 VN_{84}	—	November 13, 2006	Kitt Peak	Spacewatch	(5)	1.3 km	MPC · JPL
406130	2006 VF_{85}	—	November 13, 2006	Catalina	CSS	·	1.3 km	MPC · JPL
406131	2006 VY_{96}	—	November 10, 2006	Kitt Peak	Spacewatch	MAR	1.4 km	MPC · JPL
406132	2006 VM_{98}	—	October 21, 2006	Mount Lemmon	Mount Lemmon Survey	MAR	1.1 km	MPC · JPL
406133	2006 VF_{102}	—	September 27, 2006	Mount Lemmon	Mount Lemmon Survey	·	1.6 km	MPC · JPL
406134	2006 VJ_{103}	—	November 12, 2006	Lulin	Lin, H.-C., Q. Ye	·	1.8 km	MPC · JPL
406135	2006 VB_{104}	—	November 13, 2006	Kitt Peak	Spacewatch	·	1.7 km	MPC · JPL
406136	2006 VL_{108}	—	October 20, 2006	Mount Lemmon	Mount Lemmon Survey	·	1.6 km	MPC · JPL
406137	2006 VP_{109}	—	October 30, 2006	Catalina	CSS	·	1.9 km	MPC · JPL
406138	2006 VM_{111}	—	November 13, 2006	Kitt Peak	Spacewatch	(5)	1.2 km	MPC · JPL
406139	2006 VW_{113}	—	November 13, 2006	Kitt Peak	Spacewatch	JUN	1.2 km	MPC · JPL
406140	2006 VA_{114}	—	October 21, 2006	Kitt Peak	Spacewatch	·	1.1 km	MPC · JPL
406141	2006 VE_{115}	—	October 4, 2006	Mount Lemmon	Mount Lemmon Survey	·	1.3 km	MPC · JPL
406142	2006 VM_{116}	—	November 14, 2006	Socorro	LINEAR	·	1.7 km	MPC · JPL
406143	2006 VK_{118}	—	October 27, 2006	Mount Lemmon	Mount Lemmon Survey	·	1.0 km	MPC · JPL
406144	2006 VP_{127}	—	October 23, 2006	Kitt Peak	Spacewatch	·	1.5 km	MPC · JPL
406145	2006 VP_{130}	—	November 15, 2006	Kitt Peak	Spacewatch	·	1.4 km	MPC · JPL
406146	2006 VR_{131}	—	November 15, 2006	Catalina	CSS	·	1.3 km	MPC · JPL
406147	2006 VA_{136}	—	November 15, 2006	Kitt Peak	Spacewatch	·	1.4 km	MPC · JPL
406148	2006 VO_{140}	—	November 15, 2006	Kitt Peak	Spacewatch	·	1.5 km	MPC · JPL
406149	2006 VH_{150}	—	November 9, 2006	Palomar	NEAT	·	1.9 km	MPC · JPL
406150	2006 VV_{154}	—	November 8, 2006	Palomar	NEAT	·	1.3 km	MPC · JPL
406151	2006 VB_{155}	—	May 8, 2005	Kitt Peak	Spacewatch	ADE	1.9 km	MPC · JPL
406152	2006 VK_{169}	—	November 10, 2006	Kitt Peak	Spacewatch	·	1.4 km	MPC · JPL
406153	2006 VM_{169}	—	November 11, 2006	Kitt Peak	Spacewatch	·	1.2 km	MPC · JPL
406154	2006 VT_{170}	—	November 1, 2006	Mount Lemmon	Mount Lemmon Survey	·	940 m	MPC · JPL
406155	2006 VU_{171}	—	November 8, 2006	Palomar	NEAT	·	1.6 km	MPC · JPL
406156	2006 VA_{172}	—	November 13, 2006	Mount Lemmon	Mount Lemmon Survey	·	3.3 km	MPC · JPL
406157	2006 WT_{4}	—	September 18, 2006	Kitt Peak	Spacewatch	(5)	950 m	MPC · JPL
406158	2006 WM_{6}	—	November 16, 2006	Kitt Peak	Spacewatch	(194)	1.6 km	MPC · JPL
406159	2006 WU_{11}	—	October 19, 2006	Mount Lemmon	Mount Lemmon Survey	·	1.8 km	MPC · JPL
406160	2006 WQ_{17}	—	November 1, 2006	Mount Lemmon	Mount Lemmon Survey	·	1.0 km	MPC · JPL
406161	2006 WP_{26}	—	November 18, 2006	Socorro	LINEAR	·	2.4 km	MPC · JPL
406162	2006 WF_{35}	—	November 16, 2006	Kitt Peak	Spacewatch	·	1.3 km	MPC · JPL
406163	2006 WB_{38}	—	October 23, 2006	Mount Lemmon	Mount Lemmon Survey	·	1 km	MPC · JPL
406164	2006 WH_{38}	—	November 16, 2006	Kitt Peak	Spacewatch	·	1.3 km	MPC · JPL
406165	2006 WC_{40}	—	November 16, 2006	Kitt Peak	Spacewatch	(5)	1.2 km	MPC · JPL
406166	2006 WY_{45}	—	November 16, 2006	Mount Lemmon	Mount Lemmon Survey	·	1.7 km	MPC · JPL
406167	2006 WM_{47}	—	November 16, 2006	Kitt Peak	Spacewatch	·	2.6 km	MPC · JPL
406168	2006 WS_{47}	—	November 16, 2006	Kitt Peak	Spacewatch	·	1.4 km	MPC · JPL
406169	2006 WX_{50}	—	November 1, 2006	Mount Lemmon	Mount Lemmon Survey	·	1.0 km	MPC · JPL
406170	2006 WN_{52}	—	November 16, 2006	Kitt Peak	Spacewatch	·	2.1 km	MPC · JPL
406171	2006 WC_{58}	—	November 17, 2006	Kitt Peak	Spacewatch	(5)	1.2 km	MPC · JPL
406172	2006 WB_{72}	—	October 31, 2006	Mount Lemmon	Mount Lemmon Survey	·	1.9 km	MPC · JPL
406173	2006 WF_{72}	—	October 31, 2006	Mount Lemmon	Mount Lemmon Survey	·	1.1 km	MPC · JPL
406174	2006 WC_{74}	—	November 18, 2006	Kitt Peak	Spacewatch	·	1.5 km	MPC · JPL
406175	2006 WB_{78}	—	November 18, 2006	Kitt Peak	Spacewatch	·	1.1 km	MPC · JPL
406176	2006 WQ_{80}	—	November 18, 2006	Kitt Peak	Spacewatch	·	3.1 km	MPC · JPL
406177	2006 WQ_{81}	—	November 18, 2006	Kitt Peak	Spacewatch	·	1.2 km	MPC · JPL
406178	2006 WO_{94}	—	November 19, 2006	Kitt Peak	Spacewatch	·	1.5 km	MPC · JPL
406179	2006 WL_{98}	—	November 19, 2006	Kitt Peak	Spacewatch	·	1.3 km	MPC · JPL
406180	2006 WV_{99}	—	November 19, 2006	Kitt Peak	Spacewatch	(5)	1.1 km	MPC · JPL
406181	2006 WC_{100}	—	November 19, 2006	Catalina	CSS	·	1.9 km	MPC · JPL
406182	2006 WD_{100}	—	October 22, 2006	Catalina	CSS	·	1.1 km	MPC · JPL
406183	2006 WW_{101}	—	November 19, 2006	Catalina	CSS	·	1.1 km	MPC · JPL
406184	2006 WX_{108}	—	November 15, 2006	Catalina	CSS	·	1.7 km	MPC · JPL
406185	2006 WE_{117}	—	October 23, 2006	Catalina	CSS	EUN	1.5 km	MPC · JPL
406186	2006 WQ_{117}	—	November 20, 2006	Catalina	CSS	·	1.3 km	MPC · JPL
406187	2006 WM_{122}	—	November 21, 2006	Mount Lemmon	Mount Lemmon Survey	·	1.6 km	MPC · JPL
406188	2006 WK_{124}	—	November 14, 2006	Kitt Peak	Spacewatch	·	1.2 km	MPC · JPL
406189	2006 WP_{128}	—	November 26, 2006	7300	W. K. Y. Yeung	·	1.3 km	MPC · JPL
406190	2006 WJ_{136}	—	November 19, 2006	Kitt Peak	Spacewatch	·	1.5 km	MPC · JPL
406191	2006 WP_{139}	—	October 31, 2006	Mount Lemmon	Mount Lemmon Survey	·	1.6 km	MPC · JPL
406192	2006 WY_{142}	—	November 20, 2006	Kitt Peak	Spacewatch	·	1.4 km	MPC · JPL
406193	2006 WT_{172}	—	November 23, 2006	Kitt Peak	Spacewatch	·	1.7 km	MPC · JPL
406194	2006 WA_{179}	—	November 24, 2006	Mount Lemmon	Mount Lemmon Survey	·	1.2 km	MPC · JPL
406195	2006 WR_{185}	—	November 16, 2006	Catalina	CSS	MAR	1.2 km	MPC · JPL
406196	2006 WP_{190}	—	November 25, 2006	Kitt Peak	Spacewatch	·	2.2 km	MPC · JPL
406197	2006 WV_{194}	—	November 18, 2006	Mount Lemmon	Mount Lemmon Survey	·	1.7 km	MPC · JPL
406198	2006 WX_{199}	—	November 16, 2006	Mount Lemmon	Mount Lemmon Survey	·	2.8 km	MPC · JPL
406199	2006 WQ_{200}	—	November 22, 2006	Kitt Peak	Spacewatch	·	1.1 km	MPC · JPL
406200	2006 WP_{201}	—	November 22, 2006	Socorro	LINEAR	·	2.1 km	MPC · JPL

== 406201–406300 ==
back to top

Designation			Discovery			Properties		Ref
Permanent	Provisional	Named after	Date	Site	Discoverer(s)	Category	Diam.	Ref
406201	2006 XF_{16}	—	December 10, 2006	Kitt Peak	Spacewatch	EUN	1.3 km	MPC · JPL
406202	2006 XV_{16}	—	November 27, 2006	Mount Lemmon	Mount Lemmon Survey	·	1.7 km	MPC · JPL
406203	2006 XL_{25}	—	December 12, 2006	Mount Lemmon	Mount Lemmon Survey	·	1.4 km	MPC · JPL
406204	2006 XB_{38}	—	December 11, 2006	Kitt Peak	Spacewatch	·	2.5 km	MPC · JPL
406205	2006 XM_{63}	—	September 19, 2006	Catalina	CSS	·	1.7 km	MPC · JPL
406206	2006 XT_{63}	—	November 15, 2006	Catalina	CSS	EUN	1.5 km	MPC · JPL
406207	2006 XN_{65}	—	December 12, 2006	Palomar	NEAT	·	1.7 km	MPC · JPL
406208	2006 YP_{8}	—	December 20, 2006	Mount Lemmon	Mount Lemmon Survey	·	1.4 km	MPC · JPL
406209	2006 YW_{22}	—	December 13, 2006	Kitt Peak	Spacewatch	WIT	1.1 km	MPC · JPL
406210	2006 YN_{38}	—	November 25, 2006	Mount Lemmon	Mount Lemmon Survey	·	1.3 km	MPC · JPL
406211	2006 YV_{45}	—	November 22, 2006	Socorro	LINEAR	GAL	1.9 km	MPC · JPL
406212	2006 YP_{47}	—	December 14, 2006	Kitt Peak	Spacewatch	·	2.5 km	MPC · JPL
406213	2007 AB_{2}	—	January 10, 2007	Catalina	CSS	APO · PHA	300 m	MPC · JPL
406214	2007 AP_{3}	—	November 18, 2006	Mount Lemmon	Mount Lemmon Survey	ADE	2.6 km	MPC · JPL
406215	2007 AZ_{24}	—	January 10, 2007	Kitt Peak	Spacewatch	·	1.3 km	MPC · JPL
406216	2007 AN_{29}	—	January 8, 2007	Kitt Peak	Spacewatch	·	1.5 km	MPC · JPL
406217	2007 AM_{31}	—	November 22, 2006	Mount Lemmon	Mount Lemmon Survey	JUN	1.2 km	MPC · JPL
406218	2007 BB_{15}	—	January 17, 2007	Kitt Peak	Spacewatch	·	1.7 km	MPC · JPL
406219	2007 BK_{18}	—	January 17, 2007	Palomar	NEAT	·	2.0 km	MPC · JPL
406220	2007 BD_{20}	—	December 21, 2006	Kitt Peak	Spacewatch	·	2.5 km	MPC · JPL
406221	2007 BO_{20}	—	January 23, 2007	Anderson Mesa	LONEOS	·	1.4 km	MPC · JPL
406222	2007 BP_{22}	—	January 24, 2007	Catalina	CSS	·	1.6 km	MPC · JPL
406223	2007 BP_{31}	—	January 17, 2007	Mount Lemmon	Mount Lemmon Survey	·	1.7 km	MPC · JPL
406224	2007 BV_{31}	—	December 24, 2006	Mount Lemmon	Mount Lemmon Survey	·	1.4 km	MPC · JPL
406225	2007 BF_{32}	—	January 24, 2007	Mount Lemmon	Mount Lemmon Survey	·	1.6 km	MPC · JPL
406226	2007 BL_{32}	—	January 24, 2007	Mount Lemmon	Mount Lemmon Survey	·	1.8 km	MPC · JPL
406227	2007 BO_{34}	—	January 24, 2007	Mount Lemmon	Mount Lemmon Survey	·	2.1 km	MPC · JPL
406228	2007 BR_{36}	—	October 23, 2006	Mount Lemmon	Mount Lemmon Survey	·	1.7 km	MPC · JPL
406229	2007 BA_{39}	—	January 24, 2007	Catalina	CSS	·	2.1 km	MPC · JPL
406230	2007 BO_{50}	—	November 1, 2006	Kitt Peak	Spacewatch	·	2.7 km	MPC · JPL
406231	2007 BR_{52}	—	January 24, 2007	Kitt Peak	Spacewatch	·	1.7 km	MPC · JPL
406232	2007 BZ_{54}	—	January 24, 2007	Mount Lemmon	Mount Lemmon Survey	·	1.2 km	MPC · JPL
406233	2007 BO_{63}	—	October 25, 2005	Kitt Peak	Spacewatch	·	2.2 km	MPC · JPL
406234	2007 BC_{66}	—	January 27, 2007	Mount Lemmon	Mount Lemmon Survey	·	1.8 km	MPC · JPL
406235	2007 BF_{73}	—	January 25, 2007	Socorro	LINEAR	·	1.6 km	MPC · JPL
406236	2007 BJ_{100}	—	January 17, 2007	Kitt Peak	Spacewatch	HOF	2.8 km	MPC · JPL
406237	2007 CW_{10}	—	November 24, 2006	Mount Lemmon	Mount Lemmon Survey	·	1.5 km	MPC · JPL
406238	2007 CQ_{17}	—	November 21, 2006	Mount Lemmon	Mount Lemmon Survey	DOR	2.5 km	MPC · JPL
406239	2007 CB_{37}	—	January 27, 2007	Kitt Peak	Spacewatch	AGN	1.0 km	MPC · JPL
406240	2007 CB_{48}	—	February 10, 2007	Mount Lemmon	Mount Lemmon Survey	·	2.2 km	MPC · JPL
406241	2007 CM_{50}	—	February 8, 2007	Palomar	NEAT	·	1.4 km	MPC · JPL
406242	2007 CJ_{55}	—	February 10, 2007	Mount Lemmon	Mount Lemmon Survey	AEO	1.0 km	MPC · JPL
406243	2007 CY_{62}	—	January 10, 2007	Kitt Peak	Spacewatch	·	2.8 km	MPC · JPL
406244	2007 CP_{75}	—	February 14, 2007	Mauna Kea	Mauna Kea	·	1.2 km	MPC · JPL
406245	2007 DP_{13}	—	February 16, 2007	Črni Vrh	Matičič, S.	·	2.6 km	MPC · JPL
406246	2007 DE_{21}	—	January 28, 2007	Mount Lemmon	Mount Lemmon Survey	·	2.0 km	MPC · JPL
406247	2007 DT_{22}	—	February 17, 2007	Kitt Peak	Spacewatch	·	1.9 km	MPC · JPL
406248	2007 DX_{25}	—	January 27, 2007	Mount Lemmon	Mount Lemmon Survey	·	1.5 km	MPC · JPL
406249	2007 DG_{32}	—	February 17, 2007	Kitt Peak	Spacewatch	·	2.0 km	MPC · JPL
406250	2007 DL_{32}	—	February 17, 2007	Kitt Peak	Spacewatch	·	1.8 km	MPC · JPL
406251	2007 DY_{32}	—	January 27, 2007	Mount Lemmon	Mount Lemmon Survey	·	3.4 km	MPC · JPL
406252	2007 DW_{38}	—	February 17, 2007	Kitt Peak	Spacewatch	·	2.4 km	MPC · JPL
406253	2007 DD_{43}	—	February 8, 2007	Kitt Peak	Spacewatch	·	1.9 km	MPC · JPL
406254	2007 DA_{55}	—	August 23, 2004	Kitt Peak	Spacewatch	EOS	2.1 km	MPC · JPL
406255	2007 DP_{63}	—	February 21, 2007	Kitt Peak	Spacewatch	·	2.2 km	MPC · JPL
406256	2007 DH_{91}	—	February 23, 2007	Mount Lemmon	Mount Lemmon Survey	·	3.2 km	MPC · JPL
406257	2007 DE_{96}	—	February 23, 2007	Kitt Peak	Spacewatch	·	1.7 km	MPC · JPL
406258	2007 DQ_{115}	—	February 21, 2007	Mount Lemmon	Mount Lemmon Survey	THM	2.2 km	MPC · JPL
406259	2007 DB_{116}	—	November 4, 2005	Kitt Peak	Spacewatch	KOR	1.2 km	MPC · JPL
406260	2007 DS_{116}	—	February 17, 2007	Črni Vrh	Matičič, S.	·	2.0 km	MPC · JPL
406261	2007 DN_{117}	—	February 25, 2007	Mount Lemmon	Mount Lemmon Survey	·	3.3 km	MPC · JPL
406262	2007 EB_{4}	—	March 9, 2007	Kitt Peak	Spacewatch	·	2.6 km	MPC · JPL
406263	2007 ER_{8}	—	March 9, 2007	Mount Lemmon	Mount Lemmon Survey	·	2.9 km	MPC · JPL
406264	2007 EY_{28}	—	March 9, 2007	Mount Lemmon	Mount Lemmon Survey	·	1.5 km	MPC · JPL
406265	2007 ED_{46}	—	March 9, 2007	Mount Lemmon	Mount Lemmon Survey	EOS	1.7 km	MPC · JPL
406266	2007 ET_{48}	—	March 9, 2007	Kitt Peak	Spacewatch	·	4.0 km	MPC · JPL
406267	2007 EK_{51}	—	March 10, 2007	Palomar	NEAT	EOS	3.0 km	MPC · JPL
406268	2007 EZ_{53}	—	March 11, 2007	Mount Lemmon	Mount Lemmon Survey	·	3.1 km	MPC · JPL
406269	2007 EA_{58}	—	January 27, 2007	Kitt Peak	Spacewatch	·	1.8 km	MPC · JPL
406270	2007 EB_{61}	—	October 4, 2004	Kitt Peak	Spacewatch	EOS	1.7 km	MPC · JPL
406271	2007 EB_{66}	—	March 10, 2007	Kitt Peak	Spacewatch	·	2.4 km	MPC · JPL
406272	2007 EW_{67}	—	February 25, 2007	Mount Lemmon	Mount Lemmon Survey	·	2.5 km	MPC · JPL
406273	2007 EQ_{76}	—	March 10, 2007	Kitt Peak	Spacewatch	·	3.2 km	MPC · JPL
406274	2007 EB_{84}	—	February 26, 2007	Mount Lemmon	Mount Lemmon Survey	·	2.7 km	MPC · JPL
406275	2007 EN_{84}	—	February 26, 2007	Mount Lemmon	Mount Lemmon Survey	EUP	3.1 km	MPC · JPL
406276	2007 ET_{101}	—	March 11, 2007	Kitt Peak	Spacewatch	·	660 m	MPC · JPL
406277	2007 EH_{127}	—	February 21, 2007	Kitt Peak	Spacewatch	THM	1.9 km	MPC · JPL
406278	2007 EG_{135}	—	March 10, 2007	Mount Lemmon	Mount Lemmon Survey	·	1.9 km	MPC · JPL
406279	2007 EJ_{135}	—	March 10, 2007	Mount Lemmon	Mount Lemmon Survey	·	3.1 km	MPC · JPL
406280	2007 ES_{145}	—	March 12, 2007	Mount Lemmon	Mount Lemmon Survey	·	2.8 km	MPC · JPL
406281	2007 EU_{145}	—	March 12, 2007	Mount Lemmon	Mount Lemmon Survey	·	1.7 km	MPC · JPL
406282	2007 EY_{149}	—	March 12, 2007	Mount Lemmon	Mount Lemmon Survey	·	1.8 km	MPC · JPL
406283	2007 EW_{161}	—	March 15, 2007	Mount Lemmon	Mount Lemmon Survey	·	2.6 km	MPC · JPL
406284	2007 EU_{165}	—	March 11, 2007	Catalina	CSS	·	2.9 km	MPC · JPL
406285	2007 EG_{174}	—	March 14, 2007	Kitt Peak	Spacewatch	·	3.8 km	MPC · JPL
406286	2007 EM_{191}	—	March 13, 2007	Kitt Peak	Spacewatch	·	2.2 km	MPC · JPL
406287	2007 EO_{216}	—	February 26, 2007	Mount Lemmon	Mount Lemmon Survey	T_{j} (2.96)	3.8 km	MPC · JPL
406288	2007 EC_{217}	—	March 9, 2007	Mount Lemmon	Mount Lemmon Survey	EOS	2.1 km	MPC · JPL
406289	2007 ED_{217}	—	March 9, 2007	Mount Lemmon	Mount Lemmon Survey	·	2.3 km	MPC · JPL
406290	2007 EO_{218}	—	March 10, 2007	Mount Lemmon	Mount Lemmon Survey	·	2.1 km	MPC · JPL
406291	2007 EB_{219}	—	March 13, 2007	Kitt Peak	Spacewatch	EOS	1.7 km	MPC · JPL
406292	2007 EK_{221}	—	March 15, 2007	Kitt Peak	Spacewatch	·	2.3 km	MPC · JPL
406293	2007 FQ_{16}	—	January 28, 2007	Kitt Peak	Spacewatch	WIT	1.0 km	MPC · JPL
406294	2007 FB_{25}	—	March 20, 2007	Kitt Peak	Spacewatch	·	2.3 km	MPC · JPL
406295	2007 FK_{25}	—	March 20, 2007	Kitt Peak	Spacewatch	·	2.0 km	MPC · JPL
406296	2007 FO_{29}	—	March 10, 2007	Mount Lemmon	Mount Lemmon Survey	·	2.5 km	MPC · JPL
406297	2007 FJ_{48}	—	March 26, 2007	Mount Lemmon	Mount Lemmon Survey	THM	2.2 km	MPC · JPL
406298	2007 FT_{49}	—	March 20, 2007	Kitt Peak	Spacewatch	·	2.3 km	MPC · JPL
406299	2007 GY_{23}	—	April 11, 2007	Kitt Peak	Spacewatch	·	560 m	MPC · JPL
406300	2007 GR_{24}	—	April 11, 2007	Kitt Peak	Spacewatch	·	710 m	MPC · JPL

== 406301–406400 ==
back to top

Designation			Discovery			Properties		Ref
Permanent	Provisional	Named after	Date	Site	Discoverer(s)	Category	Diam.	Ref
406301	2007 GO_{51}	—	March 26, 2007	Catalina	CSS	TIR	3.1 km	MPC · JPL
406302	2007 GX_{52}	—	April 14, 2007	Kitt Peak	Spacewatch	·	530 m	MPC · JPL
406303	2007 GM_{59}	—	April 15, 2007	Kitt Peak	Spacewatch	HYG	2.6 km	MPC · JPL
406304	2007 HV_{21}	—	April 18, 2007	Kitt Peak	Spacewatch	·	2.5 km	MPC · JPL
406305	2007 HN_{27}	—	April 18, 2007	Kitt Peak	Spacewatch	·	2.8 km	MPC · JPL
406306	2007 HN_{42}	—	April 22, 2007	Mount Lemmon	Mount Lemmon Survey	·	2.7 km	MPC · JPL
406307	2007 HA_{43}	—	March 20, 2007	Kitt Peak	Spacewatch	·	3.2 km	MPC · JPL
406308 Nanwai	2007 HG_{60}	Nanwai	April 19, 2007	Anderson Mesa	LONEOS	LIX	3.6 km	MPC · JPL
406309	2007 HX_{69}	—	April 24, 2007	Kitt Peak	Spacewatch	LIX	3.9 km	MPC · JPL
406310	2007 HB_{75}	—	April 22, 2007	Kitt Peak	Spacewatch	·	490 m	MPC · JPL
406311	2007 HL_{84}	—	April 22, 2007	Mount Lemmon	Mount Lemmon Survey	·	3.5 km	MPC · JPL
406312	2007 HP_{95}	—	April 18, 2007	Kitt Peak	Spacewatch	EOS	2.1 km	MPC · JPL
406313	2007 JY_{13}	—	May 9, 2007	Mount Lemmon	Mount Lemmon Survey	·	4.2 km	MPC · JPL
406314	2007 JQ_{19}	—	April 18, 2007	Mount Lemmon	Mount Lemmon Survey	THM	2.3 km	MPC · JPL
406315	2007 JY_{21}	—	May 10, 2007	Kitt Peak	Spacewatch	·	590 m	MPC · JPL
406316	2007 JU_{27}	—	April 14, 2007	Kitt Peak	Spacewatch	·	4.2 km	MPC · JPL
406317	2007 JH_{31}	—	May 12, 2007	Mount Lemmon	Mount Lemmon Survey	·	3.0 km	MPC · JPL
406318	2007 JU_{37}	—	May 12, 2007	Mount Lemmon	Mount Lemmon Survey	EOS	2.7 km	MPC · JPL
406319	2007 LP_{5}	—	May 10, 2007	Mount Lemmon	Mount Lemmon Survey	·	3.3 km	MPC · JPL
406320	2007 LZ_{10}	—	November 4, 2004	Kitt Peak	Spacewatch	EOS	2.5 km	MPC · JPL
406321	2007 LR_{16}	—	June 10, 2007	Kitt Peak	Spacewatch	·	3.9 km	MPC · JPL
406322	2007 LP_{24}	—	June 14, 2007	Kitt Peak	Spacewatch	·	690 m	MPC · JPL
406323	2007 PE_{1}	—	August 4, 2007	Bergisch Gladbach	W. Bickel	·	760 m	MPC · JPL
406324	2007 PR_{8}	—	October 7, 2004	Kitt Peak	Spacewatch	·	710 m	MPC · JPL
406325	2007 PH_{36}	—	August 13, 2007	Socorro	LINEAR	·	1.1 km	MPC · JPL
406326	2007 PE_{49}	—	August 9, 2007	Socorro	LINEAR	·	760 m	MPC · JPL
406327	2007 QH_{10}	—	August 23, 2007	Kitt Peak	Spacewatch	·	690 m	MPC · JPL
406328	2007 QK_{12}	—	June 15, 2007	Kitt Peak	Spacewatch	CYB	3.6 km	MPC · JPL
406329	2007 QQ_{17}	—	August 24, 2007	Kitt Peak	Spacewatch	·	660 m	MPC · JPL
406330	2007 RB_{3}	—	September 3, 2007	Catalina	CSS	(2076)	910 m	MPC · JPL
406331	2007 RM_{14}	—	September 11, 2007	Remanzacco	Remanzacco	·	610 m	MPC · JPL
406332	2007 RU_{33}	—	September 5, 2007	Mount Lemmon	Mount Lemmon Survey	·	1.7 km	MPC · JPL
406333	2007 RN_{34}	—	September 6, 2007	Anderson Mesa	LONEOS	·	680 m	MPC · JPL
406334	2007 RS_{34}	—	September 6, 2007	Anderson Mesa	LONEOS	·	640 m	MPC · JPL
406335	2007 RV_{37}	—	September 8, 2007	Anderson Mesa	LONEOS	·	1.1 km	MPC · JPL
406336	2007 RW_{43}	—	September 9, 2007	Kitt Peak	Spacewatch	·	1.1 km	MPC · JPL
406337	2007 RT_{46}	—	September 9, 2007	Kitt Peak	Spacewatch	·	680 m	MPC · JPL
406338	2007 RU_{59}	—	September 10, 2007	Catalina	CSS	NYS	870 m	MPC · JPL
406339	2007 RE_{64}	—	September 10, 2007	Mount Lemmon	Mount Lemmon Survey	·	630 m	MPC · JPL
406340	2007 RZ_{67}	—	September 10, 2007	Kitt Peak	Spacewatch	·	1.0 km	MPC · JPL
406341	2007 RW_{79}	—	August 24, 2007	Kitt Peak	Spacewatch	·	790 m	MPC · JPL
406342	2007 RR_{87}	—	September 10, 2007	Mount Lemmon	Mount Lemmon Survey	·	1.1 km	MPC · JPL
406343	2007 RU_{95}	—	September 10, 2007	Kitt Peak	Spacewatch	·	980 m	MPC · JPL
406344	2007 RW_{95}	—	September 10, 2007	Kitt Peak	Spacewatch	NYS	850 m	MPC · JPL
406345	2007 RZ_{106}	—	September 11, 2007	Mount Lemmon	Mount Lemmon Survey	·	620 m	MPC · JPL
406346	2007 RG_{111}	—	September 11, 2007	Kitt Peak	Spacewatch	3:2 · SHU	4.7 km	MPC · JPL
406347	2007 RH_{127}	—	September 12, 2007	Mount Lemmon	Mount Lemmon Survey	·	850 m	MPC · JPL
406348	2007 RL_{127}	—	September 12, 2007	Mount Lemmon	Mount Lemmon Survey	·	780 m	MPC · JPL
406349	2007 RU_{128}	—	September 12, 2007	Mount Lemmon	Mount Lemmon Survey	·	1.1 km	MPC · JPL
406350	2007 RU_{139}	—	September 13, 2007	Socorro	LINEAR	·	970 m	MPC · JPL
406351	2007 RL_{140}	—	September 13, 2007	Socorro	LINEAR	NYS	780 m	MPC · JPL
406352	2007 RC_{162}	—	September 15, 2007	Vicques	M. Ory	·	1.1 km	MPC · JPL
406353	2007 RK_{169}	—	September 10, 2007	Kitt Peak	Spacewatch	V	800 m	MPC · JPL
406354	2007 RA_{171}	—	September 10, 2007	Kitt Peak	Spacewatch	·	970 m	MPC · JPL
406355	2007 RR_{171}	—	September 10, 2007	Kitt Peak	Spacewatch	·	720 m	MPC · JPL
406356	2007 RE_{179}	—	September 10, 2007	Mount Lemmon	Mount Lemmon Survey	·	990 m	MPC · JPL
406357	2007 RW_{181}	—	September 11, 2007	Mount Lemmon	Mount Lemmon Survey	·	930 m	MPC · JPL
406358	2007 RR_{191}	—	September 11, 2007	Kitt Peak	Spacewatch	·	920 m	MPC · JPL
406359	2007 RA_{193}	—	September 12, 2007	Kitt Peak	Spacewatch	·	1.1 km	MPC · JPL
406360	2007 RU_{195}	—	September 12, 2007	Kitt Peak	Spacewatch	·	850 m	MPC · JPL
406361	2007 RQ_{200}	—	September 13, 2007	Kitt Peak	Spacewatch	·	880 m	MPC · JPL
406362	2007 RD_{202}	—	September 13, 2007	Kitt Peak	Spacewatch	·	950 m	MPC · JPL
406363	2007 RH_{205}	—	September 9, 2007	Kitt Peak	Spacewatch	·	1.1 km	MPC · JPL
406364	2007 RU_{210}	—	September 11, 2007	Kitt Peak	Spacewatch	·	810 m	MPC · JPL
406365	2007 RU_{212}	—	September 2, 2007	Mount Lemmon	Mount Lemmon Survey	(2076)	830 m	MPC · JPL
406366	2007 RB_{214}	—	November 8, 1993	Kitt Peak	Spacewatch	·	940 m	MPC · JPL
406367	2007 RJ_{216}	—	September 13, 2007	Anderson Mesa	LONEOS	NYS	1.1 km	MPC · JPL
406368	2007 RT_{220}	—	September 14, 2007	Mount Lemmon	Mount Lemmon Survey	·	1.0 km	MPC · JPL
406369	2007 RV_{233}	—	September 12, 2007	Catalina	CSS	PHO	1.0 km	MPC · JPL
406370	2007 RV_{252}	—	September 13, 2007	Mount Lemmon	Mount Lemmon Survey	·	1.4 km	MPC · JPL
406371	2007 RU_{265}	—	September 15, 2007	Mount Lemmon	Mount Lemmon Survey	·	750 m	MPC · JPL
406372	2007 RQ_{267}	—	September 15, 2007	Kitt Peak	Spacewatch	·	1.3 km	MPC · JPL
406373	2007 RY_{268}	—	September 15, 2007	Mount Lemmon	Mount Lemmon Survey	·	780 m	MPC · JPL
406374	2007 RE_{284}	—	September 10, 2007	Kitt Peak	Spacewatch	·	980 m	MPC · JPL
406375	2007 RH_{298}	—	September 9, 2007	Kitt Peak	Spacewatch	·	1.1 km	MPC · JPL
406376	2007 RN_{302}	—	September 8, 2007	Mount Lemmon	Mount Lemmon Survey	·	840 m	MPC · JPL
406377	2007 RM_{312}	—	September 13, 2007	Catalina	CSS	3:2 · SHU	5.9 km	MPC · JPL
406378	2007 RB_{315}	—	September 7, 2007	Socorro	LINEAR	·	1.6 km	MPC · JPL
406379	2007 RP_{315}	—	September 12, 2007	Catalina	CSS	·	1.4 km	MPC · JPL
406380	2007 RX_{316}	—	September 9, 2007	Kitt Peak	Spacewatch	·	850 m	MPC · JPL
406381	2007 RK_{319}	—	September 12, 2007	Mount Lemmon	Mount Lemmon Survey	·	1.5 km	MPC · JPL
406382	2007 RY_{320}	—	September 11, 2007	Kitt Peak	Spacewatch	·	810 m	MPC · JPL
406383	2007 RP_{322}	—	September 13, 2007	Socorro	LINEAR	·	960 m	MPC · JPL
406384	2007 RX_{323}	—	September 12, 2007	Catalina	CSS	V	800 m	MPC · JPL
406385	2007 ST_{6}	—	September 18, 2007	Anderson Mesa	LONEOS	·	890 m	MPC · JPL
406386	2007 SZ_{10}	—	September 21, 2007	Bergisch Gladbach	W. Bickel	·	1.1 km	MPC · JPL
406387	2007 SK_{12}	—	October 30, 2000	Socorro	LINEAR	·	980 m	MPC · JPL
406388	2007 SW_{16}	—	September 14, 2007	Mount Lemmon	Mount Lemmon Survey	·	1.2 km	MPC · JPL
406389	2007 TZ_{3}	—	October 5, 2007	Pla D'Arguines	R. Ferrando	·	1.2 km	MPC · JPL
406390	2007 TF_{9}	—	October 6, 2007	Socorro	LINEAR	NYS	1.1 km	MPC · JPL
406391	2007 TQ_{10}	—	October 6, 2007	Socorro	LINEAR	·	1.2 km	MPC · JPL
406392	2007 TB_{17}	—	October 4, 2007	Kitt Peak	Spacewatch	·	1.2 km	MPC · JPL
406393	2007 TQ_{19}	—	October 7, 2007	Črni Vrh	Skvarč, J.	·	1.1 km	MPC · JPL
406394	2007 TD_{33}	—	October 6, 2007	Kitt Peak	Spacewatch	·	950 m	MPC · JPL
406395	2007 TS_{36}	—	October 4, 2007	Catalina	CSS	·	770 m	MPC · JPL
406396	2007 TJ_{55}	—	September 8, 2007	Mount Lemmon	Mount Lemmon Survey	·	810 m	MPC · JPL
406397	2007 TZ_{62}	—	October 7, 2007	Mount Lemmon	Mount Lemmon Survey	MAS	740 m	MPC · JPL
406398	2007 TZ_{67}	—	September 9, 2007	Anderson Mesa	LONEOS	·	940 m	MPC · JPL
406399	2007 TG_{73}	—	October 14, 2007	Altschwendt	W. Ries	·	830 m	MPC · JPL
406400	2007 TC_{79}	—	September 15, 2007	Mount Lemmon	Mount Lemmon Survey	·	1.1 km	MPC · JPL

== 406401–406500 ==
back to top

Designation			Discovery			Properties		Ref
Permanent	Provisional	Named after	Date	Site	Discoverer(s)	Category	Diam.	Ref
406401	2007 TU_{79}	—	October 6, 2007	Kitt Peak	Spacewatch	·	940 m	MPC · JPL
406402	2007 TB_{94}	—	October 7, 2007	Catalina	CSS	·	990 m	MPC · JPL
406403	2007 TD_{103}	—	October 8, 2007	Mount Lemmon	Mount Lemmon Survey	MAS	630 m	MPC · JPL
406404	2007 TP_{105}	—	October 15, 2007	Calvin-Rehoboth	Calvin College	NYS	770 m	MPC · JPL
406405	2007 TJ_{109}	—	October 7, 2007	Catalina	CSS	·	1.4 km	MPC · JPL
406406	2007 TD_{115}	—	October 8, 2007	Anderson Mesa	LONEOS	·	1.4 km	MPC · JPL
406407	2007 TZ_{119}	—	October 9, 2007	Purple Mountain	PMO NEO Survey Program	·	1.2 km	MPC · JPL
406408	2007 TP_{124}	—	October 6, 2007	Kitt Peak	Spacewatch	MAS	660 m	MPC · JPL
406409	2007 TK_{125}	—	October 6, 2007	Kitt Peak	Spacewatch	NYS	1.0 km	MPC · JPL
406410	2007 TT_{129}	—	September 15, 2007	Mount Lemmon	Mount Lemmon Survey	·	1.1 km	MPC · JPL
406411	2007 TZ_{137}	—	October 8, 2007	Mount Lemmon	Mount Lemmon Survey	·	1.1 km	MPC · JPL
406412	2007 TW_{144}	—	October 6, 2007	Socorro	LINEAR	·	950 m	MPC · JPL
406413	2007 TZ_{150}	—	September 24, 2007	Kitt Peak	Spacewatch	·	920 m	MPC · JPL
406414	2007 TG_{153}	—	October 9, 2007	Socorro	LINEAR	·	1.4 km	MPC · JPL
406415	2007 TH_{156}	—	October 8, 2007	Catalina	CSS	·	980 m	MPC · JPL
406416	2007 TA_{159}	—	September 24, 2007	Kitt Peak	Spacewatch	·	1.1 km	MPC · JPL
406417	2007 TP_{160}	—	October 9, 2007	Socorro	LINEAR	·	1.3 km	MPC · JPL
406418	2007 TP_{163}	—	September 15, 2007	Mount Lemmon	Mount Lemmon Survey	MAS	740 m	MPC · JPL
406419	2007 TZ_{166}	—	October 12, 2007	Socorro	LINEAR	·	1.1 km	MPC · JPL
406420	2007 TF_{170}	—	September 27, 2007	Mount Lemmon	Mount Lemmon Survey	·	1.2 km	MPC · JPL
406421	2007 TL_{175}	—	October 4, 2007	Kitt Peak	Spacewatch	MAS	720 m	MPC · JPL
406422	2007 TR_{176}	—	October 6, 2007	Kitt Peak	Spacewatch	·	1.4 km	MPC · JPL
406423	2007 TN_{179}	—	October 7, 2007	Catalina	CSS	·	1.2 km	MPC · JPL
406424	2007 TJ_{182}	—	September 11, 2007	Catalina	CSS	·	1.3 km	MPC · JPL
406425	2007 TQ_{197}	—	October 8, 2007	Mount Lemmon	Mount Lemmon Survey	·	1.0 km	MPC · JPL
406426	2007 TY_{200}	—	October 8, 2007	Kitt Peak	Spacewatch	V	630 m	MPC · JPL
406427	2007 TB_{207}	—	October 10, 2007	Mount Lemmon	Mount Lemmon Survey	·	970 m	MPC · JPL
406428	2007 TH_{213}	—	October 7, 2007	Kitt Peak	Spacewatch	·	900 m	MPC · JPL
406429	2007 TL_{218}	—	October 7, 2007	Kitt Peak	Spacewatch	MAS	660 m	MPC · JPL
406430	2007 TE_{224}	—	October 10, 2007	Mount Lemmon	Mount Lemmon Survey	·	910 m	MPC · JPL
406431	2007 TZ_{235}	—	October 9, 2007	Mount Lemmon	Mount Lemmon Survey	·	950 m	MPC · JPL
406432	2007 TK_{240}	—	October 14, 2007	Socorro	LINEAR	·	1.1 km	MPC · JPL
406433	2007 TQ_{243}	—	October 8, 2007	Anderson Mesa	LONEOS	PHO	1.0 km	MPC · JPL
406434	2007 TQ_{245}	—	October 8, 2007	Purple Mountain	PMO NEO Survey Program	·	1.2 km	MPC · JPL
406435	2007 TQ_{256}	—	October 10, 2007	Kitt Peak	Spacewatch	·	970 m	MPC · JPL
406436	2007 TS_{262}	—	October 10, 2007	Kitt Peak	Spacewatch	·	820 m	MPC · JPL
406437	2007 TB_{283}	—	October 8, 2007	Mount Lemmon	Mount Lemmon Survey	·	1.2 km	MPC · JPL
406438	2007 TE_{292}	—	September 11, 2007	Mount Lemmon	Mount Lemmon Survey	NYS	980 m	MPC · JPL
406439	2007 TM_{307}	—	October 9, 2007	Kitt Peak	Spacewatch	·	880 m	MPC · JPL
406440	2007 TK_{311}	—	September 11, 2007	Mount Lemmon	Mount Lemmon Survey	MAS	750 m	MPC · JPL
406441	2007 TR_{322}	—	October 11, 2007	Kitt Peak	Spacewatch	·	1.1 km	MPC · JPL
406442	2007 TT_{323}	—	September 29, 2003	Kitt Peak	Spacewatch	·	1.7 km	MPC · JPL
406443	2007 TW_{338}	—	October 15, 2007	Kitt Peak	Spacewatch	·	830 m	MPC · JPL
406444	2007 TB_{358}	—	October 14, 2007	Mount Lemmon	Mount Lemmon Survey	ERI	1.4 km	MPC · JPL
406445	2007 TL_{367}	—	October 10, 2007	Catalina	CSS	·	850 m	MPC · JPL
406446	2007 TB_{377}	—	October 11, 2007	Catalina	CSS	·	760 m	MPC · JPL
406447	2007 TB_{382}	—	October 14, 2007	Kitt Peak	Spacewatch	MAS	540 m	MPC · JPL
406448	2007 TD_{383}	—	October 14, 2007	Kitt Peak	Spacewatch	V	680 m	MPC · JPL
406449	2007 TO_{385}	—	October 4, 2007	Kitt Peak	Spacewatch	·	760 m	MPC · JPL
406450	2007 TP_{397}	—	October 10, 2007	Catalina	CSS	·	1.4 km	MPC · JPL
406451	2007 TN_{401}	—	October 15, 2007	Catalina	CSS	3:2	4.5 km	MPC · JPL
406452	2007 TE_{428}	—	October 10, 2007	Kitt Peak	Spacewatch	·	990 m	MPC · JPL
406453	2007 TE_{430}	—	October 12, 2007	Mount Lemmon	Mount Lemmon Survey	·	1.3 km	MPC · JPL
406454	2007 TG_{430}	—	October 14, 2007	Mount Lemmon	Mount Lemmon Survey	·	1.3 km	MPC · JPL
406455	2007 TD_{433}	—	October 8, 2007	Kitt Peak	Spacewatch	NYS	1.1 km	MPC · JPL
406456	2007 TP_{434}	—	October 10, 2007	Catalina	CSS	·	710 m	MPC · JPL
406457	2007 TO_{435}	—	October 13, 2007	Catalina	CSS	·	1.1 km	MPC · JPL
406458	2007 TS_{435}	—	October 14, 2007	Mount Lemmon	Mount Lemmon Survey	·	1.1 km	MPC · JPL
406459	2007 TH_{437}	—	October 8, 2007	Mount Lemmon	Mount Lemmon Survey	3:2 · SHU	5.0 km	MPC · JPL
406460	2007 TY_{446}	—	October 10, 2007	Catalina	CSS	·	1.8 km	MPC · JPL
406461	2007 UD_{15}	—	September 12, 2007	Mount Lemmon	Mount Lemmon Survey	·	1.4 km	MPC · JPL
406462	2007 UC_{18}	—	October 17, 2007	Anderson Mesa	LONEOS	·	960 m	MPC · JPL
406463	2007 UM_{23}	—	October 8, 2007	Mount Lemmon	Mount Lemmon Survey	V	660 m	MPC · JPL
406464	2007 UY_{23}	—	October 16, 2007	Kitt Peak	Spacewatch	NYS	1.1 km	MPC · JPL
406465	2007 UO_{29}	—	October 18, 2007	Mount Lemmon	Mount Lemmon Survey	·	1.1 km	MPC · JPL
406466	2007 UW_{44}	—	October 4, 2007	Kitt Peak	Spacewatch	·	1.1 km	MPC · JPL
406467	2007 UA_{49}	—	September 15, 2007	Mount Lemmon	Mount Lemmon Survey	·	1.1 km	MPC · JPL
406468	2007 US_{54}	—	September 18, 2007	Mount Lemmon	Mount Lemmon Survey	MAS	640 m	MPC · JPL
406469	2007 UL_{56}	—	October 7, 2007	Mount Lemmon	Mount Lemmon Survey	MAS	730 m	MPC · JPL
406470	2007 UB_{59}	—	September 13, 2007	Mount Lemmon	Mount Lemmon Survey	NYS	970 m	MPC · JPL
406471	2007 UE_{61}	—	October 30, 2007	Mount Lemmon	Mount Lemmon Survey	MAS	700 m	MPC · JPL
406472	2007 UT_{71}	—	October 30, 2007	Catalina	CSS	·	1.5 km	MPC · JPL
406473	2007 UU_{77}	—	October 4, 2007	Kitt Peak	Spacewatch	·	760 m	MPC · JPL
406474	2007 UU_{82}	—	October 30, 2007	Kitt Peak	Spacewatch	·	1.0 km	MPC · JPL
406475	2007 UP_{84}	—	October 30, 2007	Kitt Peak	Spacewatch	·	890 m	MPC · JPL
406476	2007 UA_{86}	—	September 10, 2007	Mount Lemmon	Mount Lemmon Survey	NYS	950 m	MPC · JPL
406477	2007 UV_{90}	—	October 30, 2007	Mount Lemmon	Mount Lemmon Survey	·	940 m	MPC · JPL
406478	2007 UZ_{90}	—	October 30, 2007	Mount Lemmon	Mount Lemmon Survey	MAS	500 m	MPC · JPL
406479	2007 UL_{94}	—	October 7, 2007	Kitt Peak	Spacewatch	·	1.1 km	MPC · JPL
406480	2007 UN_{96}	—	October 30, 2007	Kitt Peak	Spacewatch	NYS	1.0 km	MPC · JPL
406481	2007 UL_{97}	—	October 30, 2007	Mount Lemmon	Mount Lemmon Survey	·	880 m	MPC · JPL
406482	2007 UG_{99}	—	October 30, 2007	Kitt Peak	Spacewatch	·	1.1 km	MPC · JPL
406483	2007 US_{99}	—	October 14, 2007	Mount Lemmon	Mount Lemmon Survey	·	1.4 km	MPC · JPL
406484	2007 UT_{106}	—	October 19, 2007	Kitt Peak	Spacewatch	·	990 m	MPC · JPL
406485	2007 UP_{122}	—	October 12, 2007	Kitt Peak	Spacewatch	MAS	780 m	MPC · JPL
406486	2007 UO_{131}	—	October 16, 2007	Catalina	CSS	·	1.2 km	MPC · JPL
406487	2007 UC_{139}	—	October 21, 2007	Catalina	CSS	·	2.1 km	MPC · JPL
406488	2007 VO	—	October 11, 2007	Kitt Peak	Spacewatch	·	1.3 km	MPC · JPL
406489	2007 VF_{7}	—	November 1, 2007	Kitt Peak	Spacewatch	·	1.5 km	MPC · JPL
406490	2007 VT_{11}	—	November 4, 2007	Kitt Peak	Spacewatch	·	990 m	MPC · JPL
406491	2007 VS_{29}	—	October 19, 2007	Mount Lemmon	Mount Lemmon Survey	·	1.4 km	MPC · JPL
406492	2007 VV_{29}	—	November 1, 2007	Kitt Peak	Spacewatch	NYS	1.0 km	MPC · JPL
406493	2007 VZ_{34}	—	November 3, 2007	Kitt Peak	Spacewatch	·	1.3 km	MPC · JPL
406494	2007 VD_{47}	—	November 1, 2007	Kitt Peak	Spacewatch	V	650 m	MPC · JPL
406495	2007 VX_{49}	—	November 1, 2007	Kitt Peak	Spacewatch	·	860 m	MPC · JPL
406496	2007 VR_{51}	—	November 1, 2007	Kitt Peak	Spacewatch	·	1.5 km	MPC · JPL
406497	2007 VO_{68}	—	November 3, 2007	Mount Lemmon	Mount Lemmon Survey	·	1.1 km	MPC · JPL
406498	2007 VE_{75}	—	November 3, 2007	Kitt Peak	Spacewatch	·	1.0 km	MPC · JPL
406499	2007 VX_{84}	—	November 8, 2007	Mayhill	Lowe, A.	·	1.2 km	MPC · JPL
406500	2007 VY_{100}	—	November 2, 2007	Kitt Peak	Spacewatch	·	1.1 km	MPC · JPL

== 406501–406600 ==
back to top

Designation			Discovery			Properties		Ref
Permanent	Provisional	Named after	Date	Site	Discoverer(s)	Category	Diam.	Ref
406501	2007 VW_{102}	—	November 3, 2007	Kitt Peak	Spacewatch	·	770 m	MPC · JPL
406502	2007 VK_{103}	—	October 13, 2007	Catalina	CSS	·	1.5 km	MPC · JPL
406503	2007 VL_{115}	—	November 3, 2007	Kitt Peak	Spacewatch	NYS	720 m	MPC · JPL
406504	2007 VE_{121}	—	November 5, 2007	Kitt Peak	Spacewatch	·	1.3 km	MPC · JPL
406505	2007 VA_{134}	—	October 7, 2007	Kitt Peak	Spacewatch	NYS	1.1 km	MPC · JPL
406506	2007 VM_{141}	—	November 4, 2007	Kitt Peak	Spacewatch	NYS	910 m	MPC · JPL
406507	2007 VN_{148}	—	September 14, 2007	Mount Lemmon	Mount Lemmon Survey	·	1.1 km	MPC · JPL
406508	2007 VR_{148}	—	October 20, 2007	Mount Lemmon	Mount Lemmon Survey	MAS	760 m	MPC · JPL
406509	2007 VT_{150}	—	November 7, 2007	Kitt Peak	Spacewatch	·	930 m	MPC · JPL
406510	2007 VG_{151}	—	November 7, 2007	Catalina	CSS	NYS	1.1 km	MPC · JPL
406511	2007 VO_{151}	—	November 7, 2007	Mount Lemmon	Mount Lemmon Survey	·	1.9 km	MPC · JPL
406512	2007 VD_{154}	—	September 18, 2007	Mount Lemmon	Mount Lemmon Survey	·	930 m	MPC · JPL
406513	2007 VX_{180}	—	October 8, 2007	Mount Lemmon	Mount Lemmon Survey	·	770 m	MPC · JPL
406514	2007 VR_{192}	—	November 4, 2007	Mount Lemmon	Mount Lemmon Survey	·	1.2 km	MPC · JPL
406515	2007 VO_{197}	—	November 8, 2007	Mount Lemmon	Mount Lemmon Survey	·	1.0 km	MPC · JPL
406516	2007 VM_{206}	—	October 8, 2007	Catalina	CSS	V	780 m	MPC · JPL
406517	2007 VB_{211}	—	September 26, 2007	Mount Lemmon	Mount Lemmon Survey	·	1.2 km	MPC · JPL
406518	2007 VQ_{211}	—	November 9, 2007	Kitt Peak	Spacewatch	·	1.1 km	MPC · JPL
406519	2007 VX_{212}	—	November 9, 2007	Kitt Peak	Spacewatch	·	1.2 km	MPC · JPL
406520	2007 VM_{224}	—	October 19, 2007	Catalina	CSS	T_{j} (2.96) · 3:2	6.1 km	MPC · JPL
406521	2007 VC_{225}	—	November 9, 2007	Mount Lemmon	Mount Lemmon Survey	MAS	580 m	MPC · JPL
406522	2007 VR_{226}	—	November 9, 2007	Mount Lemmon	Mount Lemmon Survey	·	1.3 km	MPC · JPL
406523	2007 VO_{229}	—	November 7, 2007	Kitt Peak	Spacewatch	·	1.5 km	MPC · JPL
406524	2007 VK_{230}	—	November 7, 2007	Kitt Peak	Spacewatch	MAS	800 m	MPC · JPL
406525	2007 VQ_{253}	—	October 25, 2007	Mount Lemmon	Mount Lemmon Survey	·	1.2 km	MPC · JPL
406526	2007 VG_{255}	—	November 11, 2007	Mount Lemmon	Mount Lemmon Survey	·	980 m	MPC · JPL
406527	2007 VH_{260}	—	November 15, 2007	Anderson Mesa	LONEOS	·	980 m	MPC · JPL
406528	2007 VV_{273}	—	October 20, 2007	Mount Lemmon	Mount Lemmon Survey	·	940 m	MPC · JPL
406529	2007 VY_{274}	—	November 13, 2007	Mount Lemmon	Mount Lemmon Survey	V	700 m	MPC · JPL
406530	2007 VS_{290}	—	November 1, 2007	Kitt Peak	Spacewatch	·	1.3 km	MPC · JPL
406531	2007 VD_{308}	—	November 5, 2007	Mount Lemmon	Mount Lemmon Survey	·	1.3 km	MPC · JPL
406532	2007 VR_{308}	—	November 7, 2007	Kitt Peak	Spacewatch	·	780 m	MPC · JPL
406533	2007 VL_{315}	—	November 5, 2007	Purple Mountain	PMO NEO Survey Program	NYS	1.1 km	MPC · JPL
406534	2007 VQ_{316}	—	November 6, 2007	Kitt Peak	Spacewatch	·	1.2 km	MPC · JPL
406535	2007 VN_{320}	—	November 4, 2007	Kitt Peak	Spacewatch	·	1.2 km	MPC · JPL
406536	2007 VD_{321}	—	November 7, 2007	Kitt Peak	Spacewatch	·	1.3 km	MPC · JPL
406537	2007 VP_{325}	—	November 2, 2007	Kitt Peak	Spacewatch	·	950 m	MPC · JPL
406538	2007 VG_{327}	—	November 6, 2007	Kitt Peak	Spacewatch	·	820 m	MPC · JPL
406539	2007 VF_{332}	—	November 7, 2007	Mount Lemmon	Mount Lemmon Survey	·	1.2 km	MPC · JPL
406540	2007 VU_{332}	—	November 8, 2007	Mount Lemmon	Mount Lemmon Survey	·	1.9 km	MPC · JPL
406541	2007 VK_{333}	—	November 11, 2007	Socorro	LINEAR	·	1.1 km	MPC · JPL
406542	2007 WJ_{5}	—	November 18, 2007	Bisei SG Center	BATTeRS	NYS	1.0 km	MPC · JPL
406543	2007 WM_{8}	—	November 19, 2007	Mount Lemmon	Mount Lemmon Survey	·	1.0 km	MPC · JPL
406544	2007 WT_{9}	—	October 12, 2007	Kitt Peak	Spacewatch	NYS	780 m	MPC · JPL
406545	2007 WB_{15}	—	September 15, 2007	Mount Lemmon	Mount Lemmon Survey	NYS	1.2 km	MPC · JPL
406546	2007 WN_{32}	—	November 2, 2007	Kitt Peak	Spacewatch	·	1.1 km	MPC · JPL
406547	2007 WQ_{37}	—	November 19, 2007	Mount Lemmon	Mount Lemmon Survey	·	1.1 km	MPC · JPL
406548	2007 WF_{44}	—	November 19, 2007	Mount Lemmon	Mount Lemmon Survey	·	1.4 km	MPC · JPL
406549	2007 WT_{57}	—	November 20, 2007	Mount Lemmon	Mount Lemmon Survey	·	2.3 km	MPC · JPL
406550	2007 XX_{23}	—	December 11, 2007	Saint-Sulpice	B. Christophe	·	1.6 km	MPC · JPL
406551	2007 XF_{54}	—	December 4, 2007	Mount Lemmon	Mount Lemmon Survey	MAS	720 m	MPC · JPL
406552	2007 XN_{58}	—	December 6, 2007	Kitt Peak	Spacewatch	·	1.2 km	MPC · JPL
406553	2007 YV_{4}	—	December 16, 2007	Catalina	CSS	·	1.2 km	MPC · JPL
406554	2007 YY_{5}	—	December 16, 2007	Mount Lemmon	Mount Lemmon Survey	·	1.3 km	MPC · JPL
406555	2007 YN_{15}	—	December 16, 2007	Kitt Peak	Spacewatch	·	1.1 km	MPC · JPL
406556	2007 YE_{27}	—	December 18, 2007	Mount Lemmon	Mount Lemmon Survey	·	1.1 km	MPC · JPL
406557	2007 YO_{42}	—	November 4, 2007	Mount Lemmon	Mount Lemmon Survey	·	1.2 km	MPC · JPL
406558	2007 YH_{47}	—	December 30, 2007	Mount Lemmon	Mount Lemmon Survey	·	1.5 km	MPC · JPL
406559	2007 YX_{50}	—	December 28, 2007	Kitt Peak	Spacewatch	EUN	1.7 km	MPC · JPL
406560	2007 YC_{51}	—	December 28, 2007	Kitt Peak	Spacewatch	PHO	2.0 km	MPC · JPL
406561	2007 YB_{56}	—	November 2, 2007	Mount Lemmon	Mount Lemmon Survey	·	1.8 km	MPC · JPL
406562	2007 YQ_{61}	—	December 19, 2007	Catalina	CSS	PHO	1.3 km	MPC · JPL
406563	2007 YO_{64}	—	December 18, 2007	Mount Lemmon	Mount Lemmon Survey	·	1.6 km	MPC · JPL
406564	2007 YK_{65}	—	December 17, 2007	Mount Lemmon	Mount Lemmon Survey	·	1.5 km	MPC · JPL
406565	2007 YM_{66}	—	December 30, 2007	Kitt Peak	Spacewatch	·	830 m	MPC · JPL
406566	2007 YX_{66}	—	December 30, 2007	Mount Lemmon	Mount Lemmon Survey	·	1.0 km	MPC · JPL
406567	2007 YP_{68}	—	December 17, 2007	Mount Lemmon	Mount Lemmon Survey	MAR	1.1 km	MPC · JPL
406568	2007 YM_{73}	—	December 30, 2007	Mount Lemmon	Mount Lemmon Survey	·	1.2 km	MPC · JPL
406569	2007 YR_{73}	—	December 30, 2007	Kitt Peak	Spacewatch	MAS	880 m	MPC · JPL
406570	2007 YN_{74}	—	December 17, 2007	Mount Lemmon	Mount Lemmon Survey	·	2.2 km	MPC · JPL
406571	2008 AH_{7}	—	January 10, 2008	Mount Lemmon	Mount Lemmon Survey	T_{j} (2.97) · 3:2	6.3 km	MPC · JPL
406572	2008 AQ_{15}	—	January 10, 2008	Mount Lemmon	Mount Lemmon Survey	·	1.3 km	MPC · JPL
406573	2008 AU_{16}	—	January 10, 2008	Kitt Peak	Spacewatch	·	1.6 km	MPC · JPL
406574	2008 AV_{22}	—	January 10, 2008	Mount Lemmon	Mount Lemmon Survey	·	1.8 km	MPC · JPL
406575	2008 AG_{24}	—	January 10, 2008	Mount Lemmon	Mount Lemmon Survey	·	1.6 km	MPC · JPL
406576	2008 AU_{36}	—	December 31, 2007	Catalina	CSS	·	1.4 km	MPC · JPL
406577	2008 AJ_{39}	—	January 10, 2008	Mount Lemmon	Mount Lemmon Survey	·	1.4 km	MPC · JPL
406578	2008 AD_{48}	—	December 4, 2007	Mount Lemmon	Mount Lemmon Survey	MAS	780 m	MPC · JPL
406579	2008 AA_{75}	—	December 30, 2007	Kitt Peak	Spacewatch	·	1.6 km	MPC · JPL
406580	2008 AG_{78}	—	January 12, 2008	Kitt Peak	Spacewatch	·	3.0 km	MPC · JPL
406581	2008 AA_{79}	—	January 12, 2008	Kitt Peak	Spacewatch	·	2.1 km	MPC · JPL
406582	2008 AK_{81}	—	January 12, 2008	Kitt Peak	Spacewatch	·	1.5 km	MPC · JPL
406583	2008 AE_{85}	—	January 13, 2008	Kitt Peak	Spacewatch	·	1.2 km	MPC · JPL
406584	2008 AK_{90}	—	January 13, 2008	Kitt Peak	Spacewatch	(5)	1.3 km	MPC · JPL
406585	2008 AP_{97}	—	January 14, 2008	Kitt Peak	Spacewatch	·	2.4 km	MPC · JPL
406586	2008 AL_{98}	—	January 14, 2008	Kitt Peak	Spacewatch	·	1.0 km	MPC · JPL
406587	2008 AX_{103}	—	December 28, 2007	Kitt Peak	Spacewatch	·	1.1 km	MPC · JPL
406588	2008 BZ_{14}	—	May 11, 1996	Kitt Peak	Spacewatch	·	1.3 km	MPC · JPL
406589	2008 BJ_{17}	—	December 19, 2003	Socorro	LINEAR	NYS	1.2 km	MPC · JPL
406590	2008 BC_{29}	—	January 19, 2008	Kitt Peak	Spacewatch	EUN	1.2 km	MPC · JPL
406591	2008 BG_{29}	—	December 30, 2007	Mount Lemmon	Mount Lemmon Survey	·	1.9 km	MPC · JPL
406592	2008 BH_{30}	—	January 10, 2008	Kitt Peak	Spacewatch	·	1.1 km	MPC · JPL
406593	2008 BQ_{36}	—	January 30, 2008	Kitt Peak	Spacewatch	·	1.7 km	MPC · JPL
406594	2008 BA_{44}	—	November 18, 2007	Mount Lemmon	Mount Lemmon Survey	·	1.5 km	MPC · JPL
406595	2008 BO_{46}	—	January 30, 2008	Mount Lemmon	Mount Lemmon Survey	·	1.5 km	MPC · JPL
406596	2008 CW_{2}	—	February 1, 2008	Mount Lemmon	Mount Lemmon Survey	·	2.1 km	MPC · JPL
406597	2008 CT_{3}	—	February 2, 2008	Kitt Peak	Spacewatch	·	1.4 km	MPC · JPL
406598	2008 CL_{9}	—	January 10, 2008	Kitt Peak	Spacewatch	·	2.0 km	MPC · JPL
406599	2008 CU_{18}	—	January 10, 2008	Mount Lemmon	Mount Lemmon Survey	·	1.5 km	MPC · JPL
406600	2008 CF_{24}	—	February 1, 2008	Kitt Peak	Spacewatch	·	1.5 km	MPC · JPL

== 406601–406700 ==
back to top

Designation			Discovery			Properties		Ref
Permanent	Provisional	Named after	Date	Site	Discoverer(s)	Category	Diam.	Ref
406601	2008 CF_{26}	—	February 2, 2008	Kitt Peak	Spacewatch	·	1.5 km	MPC · JPL
406602	2008 CP_{37}	—	February 2, 2008	Kitt Peak	Spacewatch	HNS	980 m	MPC · JPL
406603	2008 CM_{44}	—	February 2, 2008	Kitt Peak	Spacewatch	·	1.8 km	MPC · JPL
406604	2008 CT_{44}	—	February 2, 2008	Kitt Peak	Spacewatch	·	1.3 km	MPC · JPL
406605	2008 CB_{47}	—	February 3, 2008	Catalina	CSS	PHO	1.2 km	MPC · JPL
406606	2008 CM_{56}	—	January 18, 2008	Kitt Peak	Spacewatch	·	1.6 km	MPC · JPL
406607	2008 CD_{57}	—	February 7, 2008	Mount Lemmon	Mount Lemmon Survey	·	1.5 km	MPC · JPL
406608	2008 CJ_{58}	—	February 7, 2008	Kitt Peak	Spacewatch	·	1.5 km	MPC · JPL
406609	2008 CY_{59}	—	February 7, 2008	Kitt Peak	Spacewatch	·	1.1 km	MPC · JPL
406610	2008 CJ_{62}	—	October 3, 2006	Mount Lemmon	Mount Lemmon Survey	·	1.3 km	MPC · JPL
406611	2008 CO_{65}	—	February 8, 2008	Mount Lemmon	Mount Lemmon Survey	HNS	1.2 km	MPC · JPL
406612	2008 CP_{67}	—	February 8, 2008	Mount Lemmon	Mount Lemmon Survey	·	1.6 km	MPC · JPL
406613	2008 CW_{70}	—	February 10, 2008	Altschwendt	W. Ries	·	1.7 km	MPC · JPL
406614	2008 CL_{89}	—	February 7, 2008	Kitt Peak	Spacewatch	EUN	1.3 km	MPC · JPL
406615	2008 CD_{92}	—	February 8, 2008	Kitt Peak	Spacewatch	·	2.1 km	MPC · JPL
406616	2008 CX_{95}	—	November 7, 2007	Mount Lemmon	Mount Lemmon Survey	·	1.5 km	MPC · JPL
406617	2008 CK_{100}	—	February 9, 2008	Kitt Peak	Spacewatch	·	1.5 km	MPC · JPL
406618	2008 CD_{112}	—	January 11, 2008	Kitt Peak	Spacewatch	NEM	2.3 km	MPC · JPL
406619	2008 CM_{112}	—	December 30, 2007	Mount Lemmon	Mount Lemmon Survey	EUN	1.1 km	MPC · JPL
406620	2008 CU_{121}	—	February 7, 2008	Catalina	CSS	·	1.4 km	MPC · JPL
406621	2008 CB_{127}	—	February 8, 2008	Kitt Peak	Spacewatch	·	1.7 km	MPC · JPL
406622	2008 CX_{131}	—	February 8, 2008	Kitt Peak	Spacewatch	·	1.5 km	MPC · JPL
406623	2008 CT_{133}	—	February 8, 2008	Kitt Peak	Spacewatch	·	2.9 km	MPC · JPL
406624	2008 CC_{134}	—	February 8, 2008	Mount Lemmon	Mount Lemmon Survey	·	1.7 km	MPC · JPL
406625	2008 CK_{135}	—	October 2, 2006	Mount Lemmon	Mount Lemmon Survey	·	1.5 km	MPC · JPL
406626	2008 CC_{141}	—	December 20, 2007	Mount Lemmon	Mount Lemmon Survey	·	1.8 km	MPC · JPL
406627	2008 CY_{141}	—	February 1, 2008	Kitt Peak	Spacewatch	·	1.4 km	MPC · JPL
406628	2008 CN_{154}	—	February 9, 2008	Mount Lemmon	Mount Lemmon Survey	·	2.1 km	MPC · JPL
406629	2008 CP_{162}	—	February 10, 2008	Kitt Peak	Spacewatch	·	1.3 km	MPC · JPL
406630	2008 CV_{170}	—	February 12, 2008	Mount Lemmon	Mount Lemmon Survey	NEM	2.0 km	MPC · JPL
406631	2008 CE_{178}	—	February 6, 2008	Catalina	CSS	·	4.8 km	MPC · JPL
406632	2008 CV_{180}	—	February 9, 2008	Catalina	CSS	·	2.5 km	MPC · JPL
406633	2008 CM_{186}	—	November 11, 2007	Mount Lemmon	Mount Lemmon Survey	H	560 m	MPC · JPL
406634	2008 CN_{188}	—	January 18, 2008	Mount Lemmon	Mount Lemmon Survey	·	4.4 km	MPC · JPL
406635	2008 CT_{195}	—	February 2, 2008	Kitt Peak	Spacewatch	·	2.0 km	MPC · JPL
406636	2008 CX_{195}	—	February 9, 2008	Kitt Peak	Spacewatch	MAR	970 m	MPC · JPL
406637	2008 CX_{199}	—	February 13, 2008	Kitt Peak	Spacewatch	·	1.4 km	MPC · JPL
406638	2008 CQ_{201}	—	February 3, 2008	Kitt Peak	Spacewatch	·	1.6 km	MPC · JPL
406639	2008 CU_{202}	—	February 8, 2008	Kitt Peak	Spacewatch	NEM	2.4 km	MPC · JPL
406640	2008 CQ_{207}	—	February 7, 2008	Kitt Peak	Spacewatch	·	2.2 km	MPC · JPL
406641	2008 CY_{212}	—	February 9, 2008	Mount Lemmon	Mount Lemmon Survey	·	1.9 km	MPC · JPL
406642	2008 DB_{1}	—	February 24, 2008	Kitt Peak	Spacewatch	·	1.0 km	MPC · JPL
406643	2008 DX_{6}	—	February 24, 2008	Kitt Peak	Spacewatch	HNS	1.4 km	MPC · JPL
406644	2008 DP_{19}	—	February 27, 2008	Mount Lemmon	Mount Lemmon Survey	·	2.1 km	MPC · JPL
406645	2008 DB_{20}	—	February 28, 2008	Kitt Peak	Spacewatch	·	1.8 km	MPC · JPL
406646	2008 DX_{24}	—	February 28, 2008	Mount Lemmon	Mount Lemmon Survey	·	1.9 km	MPC · JPL
406647	2008 DO_{26}	—	February 28, 2008	Kitt Peak	Spacewatch	·	2.1 km	MPC · JPL
406648	2008 DP_{39}	—	February 27, 2008	Mount Lemmon	Mount Lemmon Survey	·	1.7 km	MPC · JPL
406649	2008 DV_{39}	—	February 27, 2008	Mount Lemmon	Mount Lemmon Survey	·	2.0 km	MPC · JPL
406650	2008 DO_{56}	—	February 26, 2008	Socorro	LINEAR	HNS	1.5 km	MPC · JPL
406651	2008 DE_{59}	—	February 27, 2008	Kitt Peak	Spacewatch	H	430 m	MPC · JPL
406652	2008 DH_{59}	—	February 27, 2008	Mount Lemmon	Mount Lemmon Survey	H	530 m	MPC · JPL
406653	2008 DG_{67}	—	February 11, 2008	Mount Lemmon	Mount Lemmon Survey	JUN	1.0 km	MPC · JPL
406654	2008 DR_{72}	—	February 7, 2008	Kitt Peak	Spacewatch	·	1.2 km	MPC · JPL
406655	2008 DX_{74}	—	February 7, 2008	Mount Lemmon	Mount Lemmon Survey	·	1.8 km	MPC · JPL
406656	2008 DZ_{77}	—	February 1, 2008	Kitt Peak	Spacewatch	·	1.6 km	MPC · JPL
406657	2008 DF_{78}	—	February 10, 2008	Kitt Peak	Spacewatch	·	1.5 km	MPC · JPL
406658	2008 DD_{89}	—	February 28, 2008	Catalina	CSS	KON	2.5 km	MPC · JPL
406659	2008 EE_{16}	—	March 1, 2008	Kitt Peak	Spacewatch	EUN	1.3 km	MPC · JPL
406660	2008 EQ_{17}	—	March 1, 2008	Kitt Peak	Spacewatch	BRA	1.9 km	MPC · JPL
406661	2008 EB_{20}	—	March 2, 2008	Kitt Peak	Spacewatch	EUN	1.1 km	MPC · JPL
406662	2008 EG_{22}	—	March 2, 2008	Purple Mountain	PMO NEO Survey Program	·	1.3 km	MPC · JPL
406663	2008 EC_{26}	—	February 8, 2008	Mount Lemmon	Mount Lemmon Survey	·	1.7 km	MPC · JPL
406664	2008 EA_{46}	—	March 5, 2008	Kitt Peak	Spacewatch	(5)	1.6 km	MPC · JPL
406665	2008 ES_{47}	—	March 5, 2008	Mount Lemmon	Mount Lemmon Survey	·	2.3 km	MPC · JPL
406666	2008 EZ_{50}	—	February 27, 2008	Kitt Peak	Spacewatch	·	2.0 km	MPC · JPL
406667	2008 EQ_{56}	—	March 7, 2008	Catalina	CSS	·	1.9 km	MPC · JPL
406668	2008 EL_{57}	—	March 7, 2008	Kitt Peak	Spacewatch	JUN	1.0 km	MPC · JPL
406669	2008 EM_{60}	—	March 8, 2008	Catalina	CSS	·	3.1 km	MPC · JPL
406670	2008 EZ_{60}	—	March 8, 2008	Kitt Peak	Spacewatch	EUN	870 m	MPC · JPL
406671	2008 EK_{75}	—	March 7, 2008	Kitt Peak	Spacewatch	·	1.7 km	MPC · JPL
406672	2008 ET_{87}	—	March 10, 2008	Mount Lemmon	Mount Lemmon Survey	·	2.7 km	MPC · JPL
406673	2008 ES_{90}	—	December 16, 2007	Mount Lemmon	Mount Lemmon Survey	·	1.4 km	MPC · JPL
406674	2008 EY_{95}	—	March 6, 2008	Mount Lemmon	Mount Lemmon Survey	·	2.0 km	MPC · JPL
406675	2008 EG_{99}	—	March 4, 2008	Catalina	CSS	·	2.3 km	MPC · JPL
406676	2008 EJ_{102}	—	February 11, 2008	Mount Lemmon	Mount Lemmon Survey	·	2.6 km	MPC · JPL
406677	2008 EO_{110}	—	March 8, 2008	Mount Lemmon	Mount Lemmon Survey	·	1.8 km	MPC · JPL
406678	2008 EB_{111}	—	October 8, 2005	Kitt Peak	Spacewatch	·	2.1 km	MPC · JPL
406679	2008 EJ_{113}	—	December 14, 2007	Mount Lemmon	Mount Lemmon Survey	·	1.2 km	MPC · JPL
406680	2008 ES_{113}	—	March 8, 2008	Mount Lemmon	Mount Lemmon Survey	·	1.3 km	MPC · JPL
406681	2008 ES_{115}	—	March 8, 2008	Mount Lemmon	Mount Lemmon Survey	·	1.8 km	MPC · JPL
406682	2008 EJ_{118}	—	February 3, 2008	Catalina	CSS	H	440 m	MPC · JPL
406683	2008 ES_{125}	—	March 10, 2008	Mount Lemmon	Mount Lemmon Survey	·	1.5 km	MPC · JPL
406684	2008 EL_{140}	—	March 12, 2008	Kitt Peak	Spacewatch	(5)	960 m	MPC · JPL
406685	2008 EP_{147}	—	March 1, 2008	Kitt Peak	Spacewatch	·	1.2 km	MPC · JPL
406686	2008 EN_{150}	—	March 10, 2008	Kitt Peak	Spacewatch	·	1.7 km	MPC · JPL
406687	2008 EQ_{154}	—	March 6, 2008	Mount Lemmon	Mount Lemmon Survey	HNS	1.1 km	MPC · JPL
406688	2008 EA_{157}	—	March 13, 2008	Kitt Peak	Spacewatch	AGN	940 m	MPC · JPL
406689	2008 ES_{157}	—	March 1, 2008	Kitt Peak	Spacewatch	·	1.9 km	MPC · JPL
406690	2008 EE_{158}	—	March 5, 2008	Mount Lemmon	Mount Lemmon Survey	H	400 m	MPC · JPL
406691	2008 EL_{166}	—	March 6, 2008	Catalina	CSS	·	1.9 km	MPC · JPL
406692	2008 EL_{167}	—	March 13, 2008	Catalina	CSS	·	1.5 km	MPC · JPL
406693	2008 FJ_{2}	—	February 12, 2008	Mount Lemmon	Mount Lemmon Survey	·	1.7 km	MPC · JPL
406694	2008 FX_{4}	—	March 26, 2008	Mount Lemmon	Mount Lemmon Survey	·	1.5 km	MPC · JPL
406695	2008 FE_{6}	—	December 5, 2002	Socorro	LINEAR	·	2.4 km	MPC · JPL
406696	2008 FA_{8}	—	March 25, 2008	Kitt Peak	Spacewatch	·	1.2 km	MPC · JPL
406697	2008 FM_{10}	—	March 26, 2008	Kitt Peak	Spacewatch	NEM	2.0 km	MPC · JPL
406698	2008 FQ_{13}	—	March 26, 2008	Mount Lemmon	Mount Lemmon Survey	·	1.8 km	MPC · JPL
406699	2008 FD_{18}	—	March 11, 2008	Catalina	CSS	·	1.3 km	MPC · JPL
406700	2008 FQ_{20}	—	March 10, 2008	Mount Lemmon	Mount Lemmon Survey	·	1.7 km	MPC · JPL

== 406701–406800 ==
back to top

Designation			Discovery			Properties		Ref
Permanent	Provisional	Named after	Date	Site	Discoverer(s)	Category	Diam.	Ref
406701	2008 FL_{22}	—	March 27, 2008	Kitt Peak	Spacewatch	HOF	2.8 km	MPC · JPL
406702	2008 FC_{23}	—	March 10, 2008	Mount Lemmon	Mount Lemmon Survey	·	2.1 km	MPC · JPL
406703	2008 FJ_{23}	—	March 27, 2008	Kitt Peak	Spacewatch	·	1.8 km	MPC · JPL
406704	2008 FZ_{23}	—	March 27, 2008	Kitt Peak	Spacewatch	·	2.2 km	MPC · JPL
406705	2008 FZ_{37}	—	March 28, 2008	Kitt Peak	Spacewatch	·	1.8 km	MPC · JPL
406706	2008 FM_{39}	—	March 10, 2008	Kitt Peak	Spacewatch	·	2.0 km	MPC · JPL
406707	2008 FO_{39}	—	March 10, 2008	Kitt Peak	Spacewatch	·	1.8 km	MPC · JPL
406708	2008 FF_{42}	—	March 28, 2008	Mount Lemmon	Mount Lemmon Survey	EUN	1.4 km	MPC · JPL
406709	2008 FG_{46}	—	March 28, 2008	Mount Lemmon	Mount Lemmon Survey	·	1.4 km	MPC · JPL
406710	2008 FG_{57}	—	March 28, 2008	Mount Lemmon	Mount Lemmon Survey	·	1.8 km	MPC · JPL
406711	2008 FU_{61}	—	March 31, 2008	Farra d'Isonzo	Farra d'Isonzo	526	3.2 km	MPC · JPL
406712	2008 FQ_{78}	—	March 15, 2008	Mount Lemmon	Mount Lemmon Survey	·	1.6 km	MPC · JPL
406713	2008 FB_{103}	—	March 30, 2008	Kitt Peak	Spacewatch	·	1.6 km	MPC · JPL
406714	2008 FA_{111}	—	March 31, 2008	Kitt Peak	Spacewatch	·	2.2 km	MPC · JPL
406715	2008 FA_{119}	—	March 31, 2008	Mount Lemmon	Mount Lemmon Survey	AGN	1.1 km	MPC · JPL
406716	2008 FX_{122}	—	March 28, 2008	Kitt Peak	Spacewatch	·	1.7 km	MPC · JPL
406717	2008 FB_{137}	—	March 29, 2008	Kitt Peak	Spacewatch	·	1.7 km	MPC · JPL
406718	2008 GT_{14}	—	April 3, 2008	Mount Lemmon	Mount Lemmon Survey	·	1.1 km	MPC · JPL
406719	2008 GC_{16}	—	November 23, 2006	Kitt Peak	Spacewatch	·	1.2 km	MPC · JPL
406720	2008 GC_{22}	—	March 27, 2008	Kitt Peak	Spacewatch	·	1.6 km	MPC · JPL
406721	2008 GE_{24}	—	April 1, 2008	Mount Lemmon	Mount Lemmon Survey	·	1.7 km	MPC · JPL
406722	2008 GZ_{29}	—	April 3, 2008	Mount Lemmon	Mount Lemmon Survey	·	1.4 km	MPC · JPL
406723	2008 GU_{33}	—	March 5, 2008	Kitt Peak	Spacewatch	·	1.5 km	MPC · JPL
406724	2008 GE_{41}	—	January 17, 2007	Kitt Peak	Spacewatch	AGN	1.4 km	MPC · JPL
406725	2008 GE_{47}	—	April 4, 2008	Kitt Peak	Spacewatch	·	2.4 km	MPC · JPL
406726	2008 GN_{55}	—	March 13, 2008	Kitt Peak	Spacewatch	·	1.6 km	MPC · JPL
406727	2008 GS_{58}	—	March 28, 2008	Mount Lemmon	Mount Lemmon Survey	WIT	990 m	MPC · JPL
406728	2008 GE_{75}	—	April 7, 2003	Kitt Peak	Spacewatch	·	1.7 km	MPC · JPL
406729	2008 GM_{78}	—	April 7, 2008	Kitt Peak	Spacewatch	·	2.2 km	MPC · JPL
406730	2008 GP_{87}	—	April 5, 2008	Mount Lemmon	Mount Lemmon Survey	·	1.9 km	MPC · JPL
406731	2008 GV_{87}	—	April 5, 2008	Catalina	CSS	JUN	1.2 km	MPC · JPL
406732	2008 GS_{101}	—	April 10, 2008	Kitt Peak	Spacewatch	L5	12 km	MPC · JPL
406733	2008 GK_{106}	—	April 11, 2008	Mount Lemmon	Mount Lemmon Survey	·	2.2 km	MPC · JPL
406734	2008 GE_{114}	—	October 9, 2005	Kitt Peak	Spacewatch	AGN	1.1 km	MPC · JPL
406735	2008 GB_{129}	—	April 1, 2008	Mount Lemmon	Mount Lemmon Survey	·	2.4 km	MPC · JPL
406736	2008 GA_{142}	—	April 1, 2008	Mount Lemmon	Mount Lemmon Survey	·	2.5 km	MPC · JPL
406737 Davet	2008 HP_{2}	Davet	April 25, 2008	Vicques	M. Ory	GEF	1.2 km	MPC · JPL
406738	2008 HU_{2}	—	April 4, 2008	Catalina	CSS	EUP	4.7 km	MPC · JPL
406739	2008 HQ_{4}	—	March 29, 2008	Catalina	CSS	HNS	1.3 km	MPC · JPL
406740	2008 HY_{4}	—	March 13, 2008	Kitt Peak	Spacewatch	·	1.9 km	MPC · JPL
406741	2008 HV_{24}	—	April 27, 2008	Kitt Peak	Spacewatch	AGN	1.2 km	MPC · JPL
406742	2008 HB_{26}	—	April 27, 2008	Kitt Peak	Spacewatch	·	1.8 km	MPC · JPL
406743	2008 HZ_{36}	—	April 14, 2008	Kitt Peak	Spacewatch	·	1.3 km	MPC · JPL
406744	2008 HW_{60}	—	April 14, 2008	Catalina	CSS	·	3.7 km	MPC · JPL
406745	2008 HU_{66}	—	April 25, 2008	Kitt Peak	Spacewatch	·	2.8 km	MPC · JPL
406746	2008 HV_{67}	—	April 25, 2008	Kitt Peak	Spacewatch	·	2.2 km	MPC · JPL
406747	2008 HV_{69}	—	April 29, 2008	Kitt Peak	Spacewatch	·	1.4 km	MPC · JPL
406748	2008 JA_{4}	—	May 1, 2008	Kitt Peak	Spacewatch	·	1.6 km	MPC · JPL
406749	2008 JJ_{10}	—	May 3, 2008	Kitt Peak	Spacewatch	·	2.0 km	MPC · JPL
406750	2008 JU_{12}	—	May 3, 2008	Kitt Peak	Spacewatch	ELF	4.3 km	MPC · JPL
406751	2008 JN_{13}	—	December 5, 2005	Kitt Peak	Spacewatch	EOS	1.7 km	MPC · JPL
406752	2008 JD_{22}	—	May 6, 2008	Kitt Peak	Spacewatch	·	1.9 km	MPC · JPL
406753	2008 JN_{27}	—	May 8, 2008	Kitt Peak	Spacewatch	·	2.4 km	MPC · JPL
406754	2008 JY_{27}	—	May 8, 2008	Kitt Peak	Spacewatch	·	1.5 km	MPC · JPL
406755	2008 JQ_{29}	—	May 13, 2008	Mount Lemmon	Mount Lemmon Survey	·	2.9 km	MPC · JPL
406756	2008 JN_{30}	—	May 11, 2008	Kitt Peak	Spacewatch	·	2.1 km	MPC · JPL
406757	2008 JP_{34}	—	May 15, 2008	Kitt Peak	Spacewatch	·	2.0 km	MPC · JPL
406758	2008 JW_{39}	—	May 6, 2008	Mount Lemmon	Mount Lemmon Survey	EOS	1.7 km	MPC · JPL
406759	2008 JR_{40}	—	May 15, 2008	Kitt Peak	Spacewatch	·	2.1 km	MPC · JPL
406760	2008 KD_{1}	—	May 26, 2008	Kitt Peak	Spacewatch	·	3.0 km	MPC · JPL
406761	2008 KB_{7}	—	May 26, 2008	Kitt Peak	Spacewatch	·	2.9 km	MPC · JPL
406762	2008 KJ_{9}	—	May 27, 2008	Kitt Peak	Spacewatch	·	1.9 km	MPC · JPL
406763	2008 KX_{9}	—	April 24, 2008	Kitt Peak	Spacewatch	·	1.9 km	MPC · JPL
406764	2008 KB_{14}	—	May 14, 2008	Kitt Peak	Spacewatch	NAE	2.5 km	MPC · JPL
406765	2008 KD_{15}	—	May 27, 2008	Mount Lemmon	Mount Lemmon Survey	·	1.6 km	MPC · JPL
406766	2008 KZ_{30}	—	May 29, 2008	Kitt Peak	Spacewatch	·	2.3 km	MPC · JPL
406767	2008 KS_{42}	—	May 29, 2008	Kitt Peak	Spacewatch	·	2.4 km	MPC · JPL
406768	2008 LH_{5}	—	January 7, 2000	Kitt Peak	Spacewatch	·	3.9 km	MPC · JPL
406769	2008 LL_{8}	—	April 14, 2008	Mount Lemmon	Mount Lemmon Survey	EOS	2.0 km	MPC · JPL
406770	2008 OJ	—	July 25, 2008	La Sagra	OAM	T_{j} (2.98)	4.9 km	MPC · JPL
406771	2008 OH_{21}	—	July 30, 2008	Catalina	CSS	THB	4.7 km	MPC · JPL
406772	2008 OM_{21}	—	July 30, 2008	Kitt Peak	Spacewatch	·	3.0 km	MPC · JPL
406773	2008 OM_{22}	—	July 26, 2008	Siding Spring	SSS	T_{j} (2.97)	4.4 km	MPC · JPL
406774	2008 PO_{1}	—	July 30, 2008	Kitt Peak	Spacewatch	·	2.8 km	MPC · JPL
406775	2008 PB_{2}	—	August 3, 2008	La Sagra	OAM	T_{j} (2.99) · EUP	6.2 km	MPC · JPL
406776	2008 PB_{21}	—	August 3, 2008	Siding Spring	SSS	T_{j} (2.98)	5.4 km	MPC · JPL
406777	2008 QP_{29}	—	August 24, 2008	La Sagra	OAM	·	3.2 km	MPC · JPL
406778	2008 QZ_{47}	—	August 24, 2008	Socorro	LINEAR	·	3.7 km	MPC · JPL
406779	2008 QC_{48}	—	August 26, 2008	Socorro	LINEAR	(58892)	3.1 km	MPC · JPL
406780	2008 RN_{11}	—	March 11, 2005	Mount Lemmon	Mount Lemmon Survey	CYB	4.5 km	MPC · JPL
406781	2008 RN_{16}	—	September 4, 2008	Kitt Peak	Spacewatch	EOS	2.0 km	MPC · JPL
406782	2008 RT_{27}	—	September 8, 2008	Grove Creek	Tozzi, F.	TIR	4.6 km	MPC · JPL
406783	2008 RC_{71}	—	September 6, 2008	Mount Lemmon	Mount Lemmon Survey	·	4.2 km	MPC · JPL
406784	2008 RV_{74}	—	September 6, 2008	Catalina	CSS	LIX	3.8 km	MPC · JPL
406785	2008 RZ_{76}	—	September 6, 2008	Catalina	CSS	·	3.8 km	MPC · JPL
406786	2008 RN_{82}	—	September 4, 2008	Kitt Peak	Spacewatch	(895)	4.6 km	MPC · JPL
406787	2008 RH_{109}	—	September 2, 2008	Kitt Peak	Spacewatch	·	3.0 km	MPC · JPL
406788	2008 RT_{138}	—	September 6, 2008	Catalina	CSS	·	4.4 km	MPC · JPL
406789	2008 SF_{14}	—	September 7, 2008	Mount Lemmon	Mount Lemmon Survey	·	2.6 km	MPC · JPL
406790	2008 SG_{89}	—	September 21, 2008	Kitt Peak	Spacewatch	·	4.3 km	MPC · JPL
406791	2008 SF_{90}	—	September 21, 2008	Kitt Peak	Spacewatch	·	700 m	MPC · JPL
406792	2008 SN_{143}	—	September 24, 2008	Mount Lemmon	Mount Lemmon Survey	·	650 m	MPC · JPL
406793	2008 SG_{258}	—	September 22, 2008	Kitt Peak	Spacewatch	·	4.2 km	MPC · JPL
406794	2008 TR_{65}	—	October 2, 2008	Catalina	CSS	HYG	3.2 km	MPC · JPL
406795	2008 TS_{67}	—	October 2, 2008	Kitt Peak	Spacewatch	·	950 m	MPC · JPL
406796	2008 TH_{103}	—	October 2, 2008	Kitt Peak	Spacewatch	CYB	3.7 km	MPC · JPL
406797	2008 TG_{141}	—	September 2, 2008	Kitt Peak	Spacewatch	CYB	3.6 km	MPC · JPL
406798	2008 TG_{184}	—	October 6, 2008	Socorro	LINEAR	·	5.4 km	MPC · JPL
406799	2008 UQ_{8}	—	October 17, 2008	Kitt Peak	Spacewatch	·	3.2 km	MPC · JPL
406800	2008 US_{24}	—	October 20, 2008	Kitt Peak	Spacewatch	CYB	2.9 km	MPC · JPL

== 406801–406900 ==
back to top

Designation			Discovery			Properties		Ref
Permanent	Provisional	Named after	Date	Site	Discoverer(s)	Category	Diam.	Ref
406801	2008 UX_{28}	—	October 20, 2008	Kitt Peak	Spacewatch	·	730 m	MPC · JPL
406802	2008 UM_{46}	—	July 29, 2008	Mount Lemmon	Mount Lemmon Survey	·	730 m	MPC · JPL
406803	2008 UX_{64}	—	October 21, 2008	Kitt Peak	Spacewatch	T_{j} (2.94) · CYB	3.0 km	MPC · JPL
406804	2008 UY_{66}	—	October 21, 2008	Kitt Peak	Spacewatch	·	580 m	MPC · JPL
406805	2008 UJ_{116}	—	October 22, 2008	Kitt Peak	Spacewatch	·	630 m	MPC · JPL
406806	2008 UB_{120}	—	October 22, 2008	Kitt Peak	Spacewatch	·	1.0 km	MPC · JPL
406807	2008 UM_{133}	—	October 23, 2008	Kitt Peak	Spacewatch	·	570 m	MPC · JPL
406808	2008 UN_{186}	—	September 22, 2008	Mount Lemmon	Mount Lemmon Survey	·	2.1 km	MPC · JPL
406809	2008 UM_{209}	—	October 23, 2008	Kitt Peak	Spacewatch	·	670 m	MPC · JPL
406810	2008 UK_{239}	—	October 26, 2008	Kitt Peak	Spacewatch	·	750 m	MPC · JPL
406811	2008 UA_{304}	—	October 29, 2008	Mount Lemmon	Mount Lemmon Survey	CYB	5.0 km	MPC · JPL
406812	2008 UD_{323}	—	October 31, 2008	Kitt Peak	Spacewatch	·	720 m	MPC · JPL
406813	2008 VA_{57}	—	September 27, 2008	Mount Lemmon	Mount Lemmon Survey	·	480 m	MPC · JPL
406814	2008 WN_{29}	—	November 19, 2008	Kitt Peak	Spacewatch	·	770 m	MPC · JPL
406815	2008 WA_{69}	—	November 18, 2008	Kitt Peak	Spacewatch	·	750 m	MPC · JPL
406816	2008 WE_{73}	—	November 19, 2008	Mount Lemmon	Mount Lemmon Survey	·	690 m	MPC · JPL
406817	2008 WB_{105}	—	November 30, 2008	Mount Lemmon	Mount Lemmon Survey	·	670 m	MPC · JPL
406818	2008 WN_{108}	—	November 30, 2008	Catalina	CSS	·	890 m	MPC · JPL
406819	2008 WF_{140}	—	November 24, 2008	Mount Lemmon	Mount Lemmon Survey	·	1.6 km	MPC · JPL
406820	2008 XF_{1}	—	December 2, 2008	Sandlot	G. Hug	T_{j} (2.99) · EUP	6.0 km	MPC · JPL
406821	2008 XX_{34}	—	November 19, 2008	Mount Lemmon	Mount Lemmon Survey	·	460 m	MPC · JPL
406822	2008 XQ_{51}	—	October 30, 2008	Mount Lemmon	Mount Lemmon Survey	·	1.4 km	MPC · JPL
406823	2008 YN_{16}	—	December 21, 2008	Mount Lemmon	Mount Lemmon Survey	·	830 m	MPC · JPL
406824	2008 YR_{16}	—	December 21, 2008	Mount Lemmon	Mount Lemmon Survey	·	980 m	MPC · JPL
406825	2008 YR_{21}	—	December 21, 2008	Mount Lemmon	Mount Lemmon Survey	·	1.1 km	MPC · JPL
406826	2008 YL_{62}	—	December 30, 2008	Mount Lemmon	Mount Lemmon Survey	·	600 m	MPC · JPL
406827	2008 YN_{97}	—	December 29, 2008	Mount Lemmon	Mount Lemmon Survey	·	610 m	MPC · JPL
406828	2008 YS_{101}	—	December 29, 2008	Kitt Peak	Spacewatch	·	690 m	MPC · JPL
406829	2008 YX_{101}	—	December 29, 2008	Kitt Peak	Spacewatch	·	1 km	MPC · JPL
406830	2008 YF_{116}	—	December 21, 2008	Mount Lemmon	Mount Lemmon Survey	V	780 m	MPC · JPL
406831	2008 YA_{117}	—	November 21, 2008	Mount Lemmon	Mount Lemmon Survey	·	790 m	MPC · JPL
406832	2008 YS_{118}	—	December 29, 2008	Kitt Peak	Spacewatch	·	1.1 km	MPC · JPL
406833	2008 YA_{130}	—	December 22, 2008	Kitt Peak	Spacewatch	MAS	680 m	MPC · JPL
406834	2008 YE_{139}	—	December 4, 2008	Mount Lemmon	Mount Lemmon Survey	·	1.1 km	MPC · JPL
406835	2008 YQ_{154}	—	December 22, 2008	Kitt Peak	Spacewatch	·	1.1 km	MPC · JPL
406836	2008 YK_{155}	—	December 22, 2008	Kitt Peak	Spacewatch	·	1.1 km	MPC · JPL
406837	2008 YE_{160}	—	December 30, 2008	Mount Lemmon	Mount Lemmon Survey	·	630 m	MPC · JPL
406838	2009 AZ_{1}	—	January 2, 2009	Dauban	Kugel, F.	·	780 m	MPC · JPL
406839	2009 AG_{14}	—	January 2, 2009	Mount Lemmon	Mount Lemmon Survey	·	570 m	MPC · JPL
406840	2009 AU_{14}	—	January 2, 2009	Mount Lemmon	Mount Lemmon Survey	·	1.1 km	MPC · JPL
406841	2009 AV_{31}	—	January 15, 2009	Kitt Peak	Spacewatch	·	880 m	MPC · JPL
406842	2009 AN_{35}	—	January 15, 2009	Kitt Peak	Spacewatch	·	1.7 km	MPC · JPL
406843	2009 AJ_{37}	—	January 15, 2009	Kitt Peak	Spacewatch	·	700 m	MPC · JPL
406844	2009 AX_{43}	—	January 2, 2009	Kitt Peak	Spacewatch	·	960 m	MPC · JPL
406845	2009 AC_{47}	—	January 15, 2009	Kitt Peak	Spacewatch	NYS	1.2 km	MPC · JPL
406846	2009 BA_{5}	—	January 19, 2009	Socorro	LINEAR	·	1.8 km	MPC · JPL
406847	2009 BC_{9}	—	December 29, 2008	Kitt Peak	Spacewatch	·	860 m	MPC · JPL
406848	2009 BM_{24}	—	January 17, 2009	Catalina	CSS	·	1.3 km	MPC · JPL
406849	2009 BH_{25}	—	January 18, 2009	Mount Lemmon	Mount Lemmon Survey	·	1.4 km	MPC · JPL
406850	2009 BR_{31}	—	January 2, 2009	Mount Lemmon	Mount Lemmon Survey	NYS	1.2 km	MPC · JPL
406851	2009 BD_{35}	—	January 1, 2009	Mount Lemmon	Mount Lemmon Survey	·	680 m	MPC · JPL
406852	2009 BT_{35}	—	January 16, 2009	Kitt Peak	Spacewatch	·	1.4 km	MPC · JPL
406853	2009 BQ_{63}	—	January 20, 2009	Kitt Peak	Spacewatch	V	510 m	MPC · JPL
406854	2009 BW_{63}	—	January 20, 2009	Kitt Peak	Spacewatch	V	540 m	MPC · JPL
406855	2009 BM_{74}	—	January 18, 2009	Catalina	CSS	·	690 m	MPC · JPL
406856	2009 BM_{88}	—	November 1, 2007	Mount Lemmon	Mount Lemmon Survey	MAS	780 m	MPC · JPL
406857	2009 BB_{96}	—	January 28, 2009	Catalina	CSS	NYS	970 m	MPC · JPL
406858	2009 BQ_{100}	—	January 29, 2009	Kitt Peak	Spacewatch	·	520 m	MPC · JPL
406859	2009 BH_{102}	—	January 29, 2009	Mount Lemmon	Mount Lemmon Survey	·	940 m	MPC · JPL
406860	2009 BN_{112}	—	January 31, 2009	Mount Lemmon	Mount Lemmon Survey	·	1 km	MPC · JPL
406861	2009 BP_{114}	—	December 30, 2008	Mount Lemmon	Mount Lemmon Survey	V	590 m	MPC · JPL
406862	2009 BR_{115}	—	January 29, 2009	Kitt Peak	Spacewatch	MAS	680 m	MPC · JPL
406863	2009 BF_{121}	—	January 17, 2009	Mount Lemmon	Mount Lemmon Survey	MAS	630 m	MPC · JPL
406864	2009 BC_{126}	—	January 29, 2009	Kitt Peak	Spacewatch	·	1.2 km	MPC · JPL
406865	2009 BB_{127}	—	October 18, 2007	Kitt Peak	Spacewatch	·	1.1 km	MPC · JPL
406866	2009 BA_{133}	—	December 21, 2008	Mount Lemmon	Mount Lemmon Survey	·	1.2 km	MPC · JPL
406867	2009 BY_{159}	—	January 30, 2009	Mount Lemmon	Mount Lemmon Survey	·	960 m	MPC · JPL
406868	2009 BR_{169}	—	January 16, 2009	Kitt Peak	Spacewatch	·	910 m	MPC · JPL
406869	2009 BU_{170}	—	January 16, 2009	Mount Lemmon	Mount Lemmon Survey	NYS	1.1 km	MPC · JPL
406870	2009 BJ_{172}	—	January 18, 2009	Kitt Peak	Spacewatch	NYS	1.1 km	MPC · JPL
406871	2009 BX_{172}	—	January 19, 2009	Mount Lemmon	Mount Lemmon Survey	·	990 m	MPC · JPL
406872	2009 BL_{173}	—	January 20, 2009	Kitt Peak	Spacewatch	·	1.1 km	MPC · JPL
406873	2009 BW_{179}	—	January 18, 2009	Kitt Peak	Spacewatch	·	1.7 km	MPC · JPL
406874	2009 BG_{183}	—	March 4, 2005	Mount Lemmon	Mount Lemmon Survey	·	1.2 km	MPC · JPL
406875	2009 CF_{2}	—	January 26, 2009	Catalina	CSS	PHO	1.5 km	MPC · JPL
406876	2009 CZ_{11}	—	February 1, 2009	Mount Lemmon	Mount Lemmon Survey	V	730 m	MPC · JPL
406877	2009 CJ_{29}	—	February 1, 2009	Kitt Peak	Spacewatch	·	860 m	MPC · JPL
406878	2009 CG_{31}	—	February 1, 2009	Kitt Peak	Spacewatch	·	1.6 km	MPC · JPL
406879	2009 CR_{32}	—	February 1, 2009	Kitt Peak	Spacewatch	MAS	810 m	MPC · JPL
406880	2009 CF_{55}	—	September 14, 2007	Mount Lemmon	Mount Lemmon Survey	NYS	1.1 km	MPC · JPL
406881	2009 CB_{57}	—	February 5, 2009	Kitt Peak	Spacewatch	·	1.3 km	MPC · JPL
406882	2009 CJ_{58}	—	February 3, 2009	Kitt Peak	Spacewatch	(2076)	690 m	MPC · JPL
406883	2009 CP_{58}	—	February 3, 2009	Mount Lemmon	Mount Lemmon Survey	·	850 m	MPC · JPL
406884	2009 CC_{63}	—	February 4, 2009	Mount Lemmon	Mount Lemmon Survey	V	710 m	MPC · JPL
406885	2009 CF_{65}	—	February 1, 2009	Kitt Peak	Spacewatch	·	1.1 km	MPC · JPL
406886	2009 CH_{65}	—	February 4, 2009	Mount Lemmon	Mount Lemmon Survey	·	1.5 km	MPC · JPL
406887	2009 DP_{13}	—	February 16, 2009	Kitt Peak	Spacewatch	·	1.0 km	MPC · JPL
406888	2009 DQ_{16}	—	January 1, 2009	Mount Lemmon	Mount Lemmon Survey	·	1.4 km	MPC · JPL
406889	2009 DV_{16}	—	February 18, 2009	La Sagra	OAM	·	1.2 km	MPC · JPL
406890	2009 DJ_{28}	—	January 20, 2009	Kitt Peak	Spacewatch	·	940 m	MPC · JPL
406891	2009 DY_{49}	—	February 19, 2009	Kitt Peak	Spacewatch	·	1.4 km	MPC · JPL
406892	2009 DA_{57}	—	October 8, 1994	Kitt Peak	Spacewatch	·	1.4 km	MPC · JPL
406893	2009 DD_{59}	—	February 22, 2009	Kitt Peak	Spacewatch	PHO	790 m	MPC · JPL
406894	2009 DP_{62}	—	February 22, 2009	Mount Lemmon	Mount Lemmon Survey	·	740 m	MPC · JPL
406895	2009 DP_{73}	—	February 26, 2009	Kitt Peak	Spacewatch	·	1.2 km	MPC · JPL
406896	2009 DX_{81}	—	February 24, 2009	Kitt Peak	Spacewatch	·	1.2 km	MPC · JPL
406897	2009 DV_{82}	—	February 24, 2009	Kitt Peak	Spacewatch	·	1.0 km	MPC · JPL
406898	2009 DB_{87}	—	February 27, 2009	Kitt Peak	Spacewatch	·	1.1 km	MPC · JPL
406899	2009 DK_{89}	—	February 24, 2009	Kitt Peak	Spacewatch	·	1.2 km	MPC · JPL
406900	2009 DR_{105}	—	February 19, 2009	Kitt Peak	Spacewatch	·	1.0 km	MPC · JPL

== 406901–407000 ==
back to top

Designation			Discovery			Properties		Ref
Permanent	Provisional	Named after	Date	Site	Discoverer(s)	Category	Diam.	Ref
406901	2009 DH_{115}	—	February 26, 2009	Catalina	CSS	·	1.0 km	MPC · JPL
406902	2009 DB_{121}	—	January 31, 2009	Mount Lemmon	Mount Lemmon Survey	·	520 m	MPC · JPL
406903	2009 DH_{124}	—	February 19, 2009	Kitt Peak	Spacewatch	NYS	950 m	MPC · JPL
406904	2009 DW_{124}	—	February 19, 2009	Kitt Peak	Spacewatch	·	1.5 km	MPC · JPL
406905	2009 DV_{130}	—	April 15, 2005	Kitt Peak	Spacewatch	·	1.4 km	MPC · JPL
406906	2009 DZ_{131}	—	March 4, 2005	Mount Lemmon	Mount Lemmon Survey	·	1.1 km	MPC · JPL
406907	2009 DH_{136}	—	February 19, 2009	Kitt Peak	Spacewatch	EUN	1.6 km	MPC · JPL
406908	2009 DY_{136}	—	February 26, 2009	Catalina	CSS	·	1.3 km	MPC · JPL
406909	2009 EQ_{4}	—	February 13, 2009	Kitt Peak	Spacewatch	·	1.8 km	MPC · JPL
406910	2009 EB_{13}	—	March 1, 2009	Mount Lemmon	Mount Lemmon Survey	·	1.2 km	MPC · JPL
406911	2009 EE_{21}	—	March 15, 2009	La Sagra	OAM	V	700 m	MPC · JPL
406912	2009 EX_{24}	—	March 3, 2009	Kitt Peak	Spacewatch	·	1.1 km	MPC · JPL
406913	2009 EF_{28}	—	March 1, 2009	Mount Lemmon	Mount Lemmon Survey	·	1.3 km	MPC · JPL
406914	2009 FM_{6}	—	March 16, 2009	Kitt Peak	Spacewatch	(2076)	590 m	MPC · JPL
406915	2009 FL_{7}	—	March 16, 2009	Kitt Peak	Spacewatch	·	1.1 km	MPC · JPL
406916	2009 FC_{12}	—	March 18, 2009	Kitt Peak	Spacewatch	·	870 m	MPC · JPL
406917	2009 FB_{16}	—	March 17, 2009	Kitt Peak	Spacewatch	V	650 m	MPC · JPL
406918	2009 FG_{29}	—	March 22, 2009	Catalina	CSS	·	3.2 km	MPC · JPL
406919	2009 FW_{29}	—	March 21, 2009	Mount Lemmon	Mount Lemmon Survey	·	790 m	MPC · JPL
406920	2009 FJ_{31}	—	March 25, 2009	La Sagra	OAM	·	1.5 km	MPC · JPL
406921	2009 FU_{42}	—	March 28, 2009	Kitt Peak	Spacewatch	·	1.7 km	MPC · JPL
406922	2009 FN_{45}	—	March 18, 2009	Mount Lemmon	Mount Lemmon Survey	·	880 m	MPC · JPL
406923	2009 FP_{49}	—	March 27, 2009	Mount Lemmon	Mount Lemmon Survey	V	690 m	MPC · JPL
406924	2009 FR_{56}	—	March 23, 2009	Siding Spring	SSS	·	1.5 km	MPC · JPL
406925	2009 FU_{63}	—	March 29, 2009	Kitt Peak	Spacewatch	·	1.1 km	MPC · JPL
406926	2009 FC_{66}	—	March 19, 2009	Mount Lemmon	Mount Lemmon Survey	PHO	1.3 km	MPC · JPL
406927	2009 GE_{1}	—	March 19, 2009	Mount Lemmon	Mount Lemmon Survey	·	2.1 km	MPC · JPL
406928	2009 GL_{6}	—	April 2, 2009	Kitt Peak	Spacewatch	·	1.2 km	MPC · JPL
406929	2009 HS_{11}	—	March 31, 2009	Mount Lemmon	Mount Lemmon Survey	·	1.6 km	MPC · JPL
406930	2009 HG_{14}	—	April 17, 2009	Catalina	CSS	·	1.3 km	MPC · JPL
406931	2009 HT_{20}	—	March 19, 2009	Mount Lemmon	Mount Lemmon Survey	·	1.6 km	MPC · JPL
406932	2009 HZ_{22}	—	April 17, 2009	Kitt Peak	Spacewatch	·	1.0 km	MPC · JPL
406933	2009 HZ_{27}	—	April 18, 2009	Kitt Peak	Spacewatch	·	1.2 km	MPC · JPL
406934	2009 HO_{40}	—	April 20, 2009	Kitt Peak	Spacewatch	·	1.6 km	MPC · JPL
406935	2009 HV_{56}	—	April 22, 2009	Kitt Peak	Spacewatch	SUL	2.4 km	MPC · JPL
406936	2009 HC_{66}	—	December 14, 2003	Kitt Peak	Spacewatch	·	1.5 km	MPC · JPL
406937	2009 HD_{68}	—	March 31, 2009	Kitt Peak	Spacewatch	·	1.3 km	MPC · JPL
406938	2009 HD_{74}	—	April 20, 2009	Catalina	CSS	·	4.0 km	MPC · JPL
406939	2009 HO_{74}	—	February 22, 2009	Siding Spring	SSS	·	1.9 km	MPC · JPL
406940	2009 HZ_{77}	—	April 2, 2009	Mount Lemmon	Mount Lemmon Survey	·	1.9 km	MPC · JPL
406941	2009 HA_{89}	—	April 24, 2009	Cerro Burek	Burek, Cerro	·	1.4 km	MPC · JPL
406942	2009 HC_{96}	—	April 20, 2009	Kitt Peak	Spacewatch	RAF	1.2 km	MPC · JPL
406943	2009 HO_{96}	—	April 23, 2009	Kitt Peak	Spacewatch	·	2.0 km	MPC · JPL
406944	2009 HC_{105}	—	November 14, 2007	Mount Lemmon	Mount Lemmon Survey	EUN	1.2 km	MPC · JPL
406945	2009 HC_{106}	—	April 19, 2009	Catalina	CSS	·	2.1 km	MPC · JPL
406946	2009 JW_{4}	—	April 20, 2009	Catalina	CSS	EUN	1.3 km	MPC · JPL
406947	2009 JP_{5}	—	September 25, 2006	Catalina	CSS	PHO	1.3 km	MPC · JPL
406948	2009 JA_{6}	—	November 11, 2007	Mount Lemmon	Mount Lemmon Survey	·	2.0 km	MPC · JPL
406949	2009 JH_{6}	—	April 20, 2009	Kitt Peak	Spacewatch	·	1.6 km	MPC · JPL
406950	2009 JQ_{8}	—	March 31, 2009	Mount Lemmon	Mount Lemmon Survey	·	1.5 km	MPC · JPL
406951	2009 JP_{12}	—	May 15, 2009	La Sagra	OAM	ADE	2.6 km	MPC · JPL
406952	2009 KJ	—	May 16, 2009	Catalina	CSS	APO +1km	770 m	MPC · JPL
406953	2009 KJ_{17}	—	May 26, 2009	Kitt Peak	Spacewatch	·	1.2 km	MPC · JPL
406954	2009 MY_{5}	—	June 22, 2009	Kitt Peak	Spacewatch	JUN	1.1 km	MPC · JPL
406955	2009 NA_{1}	—	October 31, 2005	Mount Lemmon	Mount Lemmon Survey	·	2.0 km	MPC · JPL
406956	2009 NN_{2}	—	December 15, 2006	Kitt Peak	Spacewatch	·	2.6 km	MPC · JPL
406957 Kochetova	2009 OK_{5}	Kochetova	July 21, 2009	Zelenchukskaya Stn	T. V. Krjačko	GEF	1.8 km	MPC · JPL
406958	2009 OJ_{14}	—	July 29, 2009	Catalina	CSS	H	600 m	MPC · JPL
406959	2009 OU_{15}	—	July 28, 2009	Kitt Peak	Spacewatch	·	2.3 km	MPC · JPL
406960	2009 OK_{23}	—	July 27, 2009	Kitt Peak	Spacewatch	·	1.8 km	MPC · JPL
406961	2009 PF_{10}	—	February 23, 2007	Mount Lemmon	Mount Lemmon Survey	·	2.1 km	MPC · JPL
406962	2009 PJ_{10}	—	May 28, 2008	Kitt Peak	Spacewatch	·	3.3 km	MPC · JPL
406963	2009 PU_{15}	—	August 15, 2009	Kitt Peak	Spacewatch	·	3.0 km	MPC · JPL
406964	2009 PM_{19}	—	August 15, 2009	Kitt Peak	Spacewatch	KOR	1.2 km	MPC · JPL
406965	2009 QJ_{3}	—	August 16, 2009	Kitt Peak	Spacewatch	EOS	2.2 km	MPC · JPL
406966	2009 QO_{3}	—	August 16, 2009	Catalina	CSS	EOS	2.0 km	MPC · JPL
406967	2009 QP_{13}	—	August 16, 2009	Kitt Peak	Spacewatch	EOS	2.0 km	MPC · JPL
406968	2009 QW_{14}	—	August 16, 2009	Kitt Peak	Spacewatch	EOS	2.0 km	MPC · JPL
406969	2009 QL_{15}	—	August 16, 2009	Kitt Peak	Spacewatch	LIX	3.1 km	MPC · JPL
406970	2009 QZ_{38}	—	August 20, 2009	Kitt Peak	Spacewatch	EOS	1.5 km	MPC · JPL
406971	2009 QA_{41}	—	August 26, 2009	Catalina	CSS	·	2.3 km	MPC · JPL
406972	2009 QZ_{44}	—	November 4, 2004	Catalina	CSS	EOS	2.3 km	MPC · JPL
406973	2009 QZ_{52}	—	August 29, 2009	Kitt Peak	Spacewatch	·	1.9 km	MPC · JPL
406974	2009 QY_{53}	—	August 18, 2009	Kitt Peak	Spacewatch	KOR	1.5 km	MPC · JPL
406975	2009 QE_{56}	—	August 27, 2009	Kitt Peak	Spacewatch	·	2.5 km	MPC · JPL
406976	2009 QL_{56}	—	August 17, 2009	Kitt Peak	Spacewatch	·	2.4 km	MPC · JPL
406977	2009 QF_{57}	—	August 20, 2009	Kitt Peak	Spacewatch	EOS	1.5 km	MPC · JPL
406978	2009 QS_{61}	—	August 27, 2009	Kitt Peak	Spacewatch	·	3.0 km	MPC · JPL
406979	2009 QE_{62}	—	August 28, 2009	Kitt Peak	Spacewatch	·	2.0 km	MPC · JPL
406980	2009 QG_{63}	—	September 25, 2009	Catalina	CSS	ARM	4.7 km	MPC · JPL
406981	2009 QL_{64}	—	August 27, 2009	Kitt Peak	Spacewatch	EOS	2.0 km	MPC · JPL
406982	2009 QZ_{64}	—	December 7, 1999	Socorro	LINEAR	EOS	2.8 km	MPC · JPL
406983	2009 RE_{5}	—	September 14, 2009	Haleakala	M. Micheli	·	1.1 km	MPC · JPL
406984	2009 RW_{9}	—	September 12, 2009	Kitt Peak	Spacewatch	·	3.1 km	MPC · JPL
406985	2009 RG_{11}	—	September 12, 2009	Kitt Peak	Spacewatch	VER	2.7 km	MPC · JPL
406986	2009 RH_{13}	—	September 12, 2009	Kitt Peak	Spacewatch	HYG	2.6 km	MPC · JPL
406987	2009 RB_{16}	—	September 12, 2009	Kitt Peak	Spacewatch	·	2.7 km	MPC · JPL
406988	2009 RP_{25}	—	September 15, 2009	Kitt Peak	Spacewatch	EOS	4.2 km	MPC · JPL
406989	2009 RF_{30}	—	September 14, 2009	Kitt Peak	Spacewatch	·	2.9 km	MPC · JPL
406990	2009 RV_{37}	—	September 15, 2009	Kitt Peak	Spacewatch	THM	2.2 km	MPC · JPL
406991	2009 RZ_{37}	—	September 15, 2009	Kitt Peak	Spacewatch	·	2.4 km	MPC · JPL
406992	2009 RT_{40}	—	September 15, 2009	Kitt Peak	Spacewatch	·	2.8 km	MPC · JPL
406993	2009 RV_{42}	—	September 15, 2009	Kitt Peak	Spacewatch	·	3.4 km	MPC · JPL
406994	2009 RD_{45}	—	September 15, 2009	Kitt Peak	Spacewatch	·	3.5 km	MPC · JPL
406995	2009 RN_{46}	—	January 29, 2000	Kitt Peak	Spacewatch	·	2.9 km	MPC · JPL
406996	2009 RU_{47}	—	September 15, 2009	Kitt Peak	Spacewatch	EOS	2.1 km	MPC · JPL
406997	2009 RS_{49}	—	September 15, 2009	Kitt Peak	Spacewatch	·	2.8 km	MPC · JPL
406998	2009 RW_{50}	—	September 15, 2009	Kitt Peak	Spacewatch	·	1.9 km	MPC · JPL
406999	2009 RR_{53}	—	September 18, 2003	Kitt Peak	Spacewatch	·	3.4 km	MPC · JPL
407000	2009 RO_{57}	—	September 15, 2009	Kitt Peak	Spacewatch	·	2.8 km	MPC · JPL

back to top

== Meaning of names ==
As minor planet discoveries are confirmed, they are given a permanent number by the IAU's Minor Planet Center (MPC), and the discoverers can then submit names for them, following the IAU's naming conventions. The list below concerns those minor planets in the specified number-range that have received names, and explains the meanings of those names.

Official naming citations of newly named small Solar System bodies are approved and published in a bulletin by IAU's Working Group for Small Bodies Nomenclature (WGSBN). Before May 2021, citations were published in MPC's Minor Planet Circulars for many decades. Recent citations can also be found on the JPL Small-Body Database (SBDB). Until his death in 2016, German astronomer Lutz D. Schmadel compiled these citations into the Dictionary of Minor Planet Names (DMP) and regularly updated the collection.

Based on Paul Herget's The Names of the Minor Planets, Schmadel also researched the unclear origin of numerous asteroids, most of which had been named prior to World War II. This article incorporates text from this source, which is in the public domain: SBDB New namings may only be added to this list below after official publication as the preannouncement of names is condemned. The WGSBN publishes a comprehensive guideline for the naming rules of non-cometary small Solar System bodies.

Named minor planet	Provisional	This minor planet was named for...	Ref · Catalog
406006 Ralys	2006 SA_{368}	Jeronimas Ralys (1876–1921), Lithuanian writer, translator and physician.	IAU · 406006
406308 Nanwai	2007 HG_{60}	The Nanjing Foreign Language School (Nanwai), one of the first seven foreign language schools in China, was founded in 1963.	IAU · 406308
406737 Davet	2008 HP_{2}	Stéphane Davet (born 1977) is a Swiss physicist and teacher in the Canton of Valais. He is an amateur astronomer and an active member of Astrochablais. He has been the president of the Commission Romande de Physique for many years.	JPL · 406737
406957 Kochetova	2009 OK_{5}	Oľga Kochetova (born 1954), a staff scientist at the Institute of Applied Astronomy of the Russian Academy of Sciences.	JPL · 406957
