= List of minor planets: 447001–448000 =

The following is a partial list of minor planets, running from minor-planet number 447001 through 448000, inclusive. The primary data for this and other partial lists is based on JPL's "Small-Body Orbital Elements" and data available from the Minor Planet Center. Critical list information is also provided by the MPC, unless otherwise specified from Lowell Observatory. A detailed description of the table's columns and additional sources are given on the main page including a complete list of every page in this series, and a statistical break-up on the dynamical classification of minor planets.

Also see the summary list of all named bodies in numerical and alphabetical order, and the corresponding naming citations for the number range of this particular list. New namings may only be added to this list after official publication, as the preannouncement of names is condemned by the Working Group for Small Bodies Nomenclature of the International Astronomical Union.

Near-Earth obj.	MBA (inner)	MBA (outer)	Centaur
Mars-crosser	MBA (middle)	Jupiter trojan	Trans-Neptunian obj.
Unclassified

== 447001–447100 ==
Designation			Discovery			Properties		Ref
Permanent	Provisional	Named after	Date	Site	Discoverer(s)	Category	Diam.	Ref
447001	2004 BH_{160}	—	January 21, 2004	Cerro Paranal	Cerro Paranal	·	460 m	MPC · JPL
447002	2004 CH_{27}	—	February 11, 2004	Palomar	NEAT	·	1.2 km	MPC · JPL
447003	2004 CH_{29}	—	January 19, 2004	Kitt Peak	Spacewatch	·	1.7 km	MPC · JPL
447004	2004 DS_{13}	—	February 16, 2004	Kitt Peak	Spacewatch	·	670 m	MPC · JPL
447005	2004 EM_{41}	—	March 15, 2004	Catalina	CSS	·	1.5 km	MPC · JPL
447006	2004 EU_{57}	—	February 26, 2004	Socorro	LINEAR	JUN	1.0 km	MPC · JPL
447007	2004 EG_{58}	—	March 15, 2004	Catalina	CSS	·	840 m	MPC · JPL
447008	2004 EF_{96}	—	March 15, 2004	Kitt Peak	Spacewatch	·	2.6 km	MPC · JPL
447009	2004 FS_{13}	—	March 16, 2004	Catalina	CSS	·	1.8 km	MPC · JPL
447010	2004 FO_{59}	—	March 18, 2004	Socorro	LINEAR	·	1.7 km	MPC · JPL
447011	2004 FJ_{106}	—	March 19, 2004	Socorro	LINEAR	H	480 m	MPC · JPL
447012	2004 FJ_{125}	—	March 18, 2004	Socorro	LINEAR	·	730 m	MPC · JPL
447013	2004 FE_{143}	—	March 27, 2004	Anderson Mesa	LONEOS	H	530 m	MPC · JPL
447014	2004 GO_{20}	—	April 9, 2004	Siding Spring	SSS	·	1.5 km	MPC · JPL
447015	2004 HF_{4}	—	April 16, 2004	Kitt Peak	Spacewatch	·	2.1 km	MPC · JPL
447016	2004 HK_{22}	—	April 16, 2004	Kitt Peak	Spacewatch	·	1.6 km	MPC · JPL
447017	2004 HH_{54}	—	April 26, 2004	Socorro	LINEAR	H	610 m	MPC · JPL
447018	2004 KH_{11}	—	May 19, 2004	Campo Imperatore	CINEOS	·	860 m	MPC · JPL
447019	2004 LS_{7}	—	June 11, 2004	Socorro	LINEAR	PHO	1.6 km	MPC · JPL
447020	2004 LE_{10}	—	June 14, 2004	Socorro	LINEAR	H	650 m	MPC · JPL
447021	2004 LP_{14}	—	June 11, 2004	Kitt Peak	Spacewatch	·	2.6 km	MPC · JPL
447022	2004 NO	—	July 9, 2004	Socorro	LINEAR	·	730 m	MPC · JPL
447023	2004 NZ_{12}	—	July 11, 2004	Socorro	LINEAR	·	790 m	MPC · JPL
447024	2004 OY_{8}	—	July 18, 2004	Socorro	LINEAR	·	970 m	MPC · JPL
447025	2004 OH_{9}	—	July 20, 2004	Great Shefford	Birtwhistle, P.	·	2.4 km	MPC · JPL
447026	2004 OC_{12}	—	July 21, 2004	Reedy Creek	J. Broughton	·	910 m	MPC · JPL
447027	2004 OH_{13}	—	July 18, 2004	Campo Imperatore	CINEOS	NYS	810 m	MPC · JPL
447028	2004 PV_{22}	—	August 8, 2004	Socorro	LINEAR	·	720 m	MPC · JPL
447029	2004 PC_{34}	—	August 8, 2004	Anderson Mesa	LONEOS	·	1.2 km	MPC · JPL
447030	2004 PM_{60}	—	August 9, 2004	Socorro	LINEAR	T_{j} (2.96)	5.7 km	MPC · JPL
447031	2004 PW_{73}	—	August 8, 2004	Socorro	LINEAR	NYS	860 m	MPC · JPL
447032	2004 PS_{82}	—	August 10, 2004	Socorro	LINEAR	·	3.3 km	MPC · JPL
447033	2004 PL_{86}	—	August 11, 2004	Socorro	LINEAR	NYS	800 m	MPC · JPL
447034	2004 QW_{28}	—	August 25, 2004	Kitt Peak	Spacewatch	(1298)	1.9 km	MPC · JPL
447035	2004 RR_{14}	—	September 6, 2004	Siding Spring	SSS	·	880 m	MPC · JPL
447036	2004 RV_{16}	—	September 7, 2004	Socorro	LINEAR	·	2.4 km	MPC · JPL
447037	2004 RA_{22}	—	September 7, 2004	Kitt Peak	Spacewatch	·	790 m	MPC · JPL
447038	2004 RF_{25}	—	September 6, 2004	Siding Spring	SSS	MAS	700 m	MPC · JPL
447039	2004 RQ_{48}	—	September 8, 2004	Socorro	LINEAR	·	1.1 km	MPC · JPL
447040	2004 RP_{49}	—	September 8, 2004	Socorro	LINEAR	·	3.2 km	MPC · JPL
447041	2004 RV_{57}	—	September 8, 2004	Socorro	LINEAR	·	2.7 km	MPC · JPL
447042	2004 RN_{70}	—	September 8, 2004	Socorro	LINEAR	NYS	900 m	MPC · JPL
447043	2004 RH_{76}	—	September 8, 2004	Socorro	LINEAR	·	1.2 km	MPC · JPL
447044	2004 RL_{88}	—	September 7, 2004	Palomar	NEAT	·	4.1 km	MPC · JPL
447045	2004 RL_{91}	—	August 21, 2004	Catalina	CSS	·	2.7 km	MPC · JPL
447046	2004 RK_{125}	—	September 7, 2004	Kitt Peak	Spacewatch	EOS	1.9 km	MPC · JPL
447047	2004 RW_{140}	—	September 8, 2004	Socorro	LINEAR	·	2.1 km	MPC · JPL
447048	2004 RB_{154}	—	September 10, 2004	Socorro	LINEAR	·	2.6 km	MPC · JPL
447049	2004 RO_{160}	—	September 10, 2004	Kitt Peak	Spacewatch	EMA	2.6 km	MPC · JPL
447050	2004 RR_{172}	—	September 9, 2004	Kitt Peak	Spacewatch	·	2.8 km	MPC · JPL
447051	2004 RK_{186}	—	September 10, 2004	Socorro	LINEAR	·	3.9 km	MPC · JPL
447052	2004 RZ_{211}	—	September 11, 2004	Socorro	LINEAR	·	3.7 km	MPC · JPL
447053	2004 RB_{224}	—	September 8, 2004	Socorro	LINEAR	·	2.2 km	MPC · JPL
447054	2004 RN_{230}	—	September 9, 2004	Kitt Peak	Spacewatch	·	3.2 km	MPC · JPL
447055	2004 RA_{231}	—	September 9, 2004	Kitt Peak	Spacewatch	·	2.6 km	MPC · JPL
447056	2004 RS_{232}	—	September 9, 2004	Kitt Peak	Spacewatch	·	3.0 km	MPC · JPL
447057	2004 RE_{242}	—	September 10, 2004	Kitt Peak	Spacewatch	·	810 m	MPC · JPL
447058	2004 RV_{245}	—	September 10, 2004	Kitt Peak	Spacewatch	EOS	1.9 km	MPC · JPL
447059	2004 RY_{245}	—	September 10, 2004	Kitt Peak	Spacewatch	NYS	920 m	MPC · JPL
447060	2004 RF_{252}	—	September 13, 2004	Socorro	LINEAR	H	450 m	MPC · JPL
447061	2004 RY_{261}	—	September 10, 2004	Kitt Peak	Spacewatch	·	830 m	MPC · JPL
447062	2004 RQ_{265}	—	September 10, 2004	Kitt Peak	Spacewatch	·	2.3 km	MPC · JPL
447063	2004 RB_{268}	—	September 11, 2004	Kitt Peak	Spacewatch	·	2.1 km	MPC · JPL
447064	2004 RP_{282}	—	September 15, 2004	Kitt Peak	Spacewatch	PHO	950 m	MPC · JPL
447065	2004 RS_{303}	—	September 12, 2004	Kitt Peak	Spacewatch	·	2.1 km	MPC · JPL
447066	2004 RY_{307}	—	August 11, 2004	Socorro	LINEAR	·	1.1 km	MPC · JPL
447067	2004 RJ_{308}	—	September 13, 2004	Socorro	LINEAR	·	1.2 km	MPC · JPL
447068	2004 RR_{316}	—	September 10, 2004	Socorro	LINEAR	·	2.7 km	MPC · JPL
447069	2004 RB_{322}	—	September 13, 2004	Socorro	LINEAR	H	470 m	MPC · JPL
447070	2004 RH_{327}	—	September 13, 2004	Palomar	NEAT	EMA	3.1 km	MPC · JPL
447071	2004 RG_{345}	—	September 7, 2004	Kitt Peak	Spacewatch	·	2.9 km	MPC · JPL
447072	2004 RD_{347}	—	September 15, 2004	Socorro	LINEAR	·	3.7 km	MPC · JPL
447073	2004 RK_{356}	—	September 7, 2004	Kitt Peak	Spacewatch	·	2.5 km	MPC · JPL
447074	2004 SP_{8}	—	September 17, 2004	Socorro	LINEAR	·	2.5 km	MPC · JPL
447075	2004 SH_{21}	—	September 21, 2004	Socorro	LINEAR	T_{j} (2.97)	3.0 km	MPC · JPL
447076	2004 SB_{39}	—	September 17, 2004	Socorro	LINEAR	·	6.0 km	MPC · JPL
447077	2004 SS_{58}	—	September 18, 2004	Siding Spring	SSS	H	600 m	MPC · JPL
447078	2004 TF_{8}	—	October 4, 2004	Wrightwood	J. W. Young	PHO	1.8 km	MPC · JPL
447079	2004 TV_{22}	—	October 4, 2004	Kitt Peak	Spacewatch	·	2.2 km	MPC · JPL
447080	2004 TH_{32}	—	October 4, 2004	Kitt Peak	Spacewatch	·	2.7 km	MPC · JPL
447081	2004 TL_{36}	—	September 22, 2004	Kitt Peak	Spacewatch	·	2.7 km	MPC · JPL
447082	2004 TX_{40}	—	October 4, 2004	Kitt Peak	Spacewatch	V	650 m	MPC · JPL
447083	2004 TC_{42}	—	October 4, 2004	Kitt Peak	Spacewatch	·	2.8 km	MPC · JPL
447084	2004 TX_{43}	—	October 4, 2004	Kitt Peak	Spacewatch	·	2.7 km	MPC · JPL
447085	2004 TP_{44}	—	October 4, 2004	Kitt Peak	Spacewatch	NYS	1.1 km	MPC · JPL
447086	2004 TV_{47}	—	October 4, 2004	Kitt Peak	Spacewatch	MAS	760 m	MPC · JPL
447087	2004 TZ_{51}	—	October 4, 2004	Kitt Peak	Spacewatch	·	2.9 km	MPC · JPL
447088	2004 TL_{60}	—	October 5, 2004	Anderson Mesa	LONEOS	·	1.3 km	MPC · JPL
447089	2004 TG_{63}	—	September 17, 2004	Kitt Peak	Spacewatch	·	950 m	MPC · JPL
447090	2004 TT_{65}	—	August 23, 2004	Siding Spring	SSS	·	3.6 km	MPC · JPL
447091	2004 TN_{67}	—	October 5, 2004	Anderson Mesa	LONEOS	·	3.9 km	MPC · JPL
447092	2004 TM_{95}	—	October 5, 2004	Kitt Peak	Spacewatch	THM	1.7 km	MPC · JPL
447093	2004 TZ_{99}	—	October 5, 2004	Kitt Peak	Spacewatch	·	3.4 km	MPC · JPL
447094	2004 TP_{100}	—	October 6, 2004	Palomar	NEAT	·	3.5 km	MPC · JPL
447095	2004 TZ_{110}	—	October 7, 2004	Kitt Peak	Spacewatch	·	3.2 km	MPC · JPL
447096	2004 TW_{118}	—	October 5, 2004	Palomar	NEAT	·	4.6 km	MPC · JPL
447097	2004 TL_{119}	—	September 21, 2004	Socorro	LINEAR	·	1.2 km	MPC · JPL
447098	2004 TB_{125}	—	October 7, 2004	Socorro	LINEAR	·	2.5 km	MPC · JPL
447099	2004 TR_{135}	—	October 8, 2004	Anderson Mesa	LONEOS	·	2.8 km	MPC · JPL
447100	2004 TQ_{145}	—	September 22, 2004	Socorro	LINEAR	·	830 m	MPC · JPL

== 447101–447200 ==
back to top

Designation			Discovery			Properties		Ref
Permanent	Provisional	Named after	Date	Site	Discoverer(s)	Category	Diam.	Ref
447101	2004 TP_{153}	—	September 23, 2004	Kitt Peak	Spacewatch	·	1.2 km	MPC · JPL
447102	2004 TM_{154}	—	October 6, 2004	Kitt Peak	Spacewatch	·	830 m	MPC · JPL
447103	2004 TQ_{155}	—	October 6, 2004	Kitt Peak	Spacewatch	·	2.2 km	MPC · JPL
447104	2004 TL_{162}	—	October 6, 2004	Kitt Peak	Spacewatch	THM	2.2 km	MPC · JPL
447105	2004 TB_{172}	—	October 8, 2004	Socorro	LINEAR	·	4.4 km	MPC · JPL
447106	2004 TN_{175}	—	October 9, 2004	Socorro	LINEAR	·	1.1 km	MPC · JPL
447107	2004 TV_{177}	—	January 19, 2002	Kitt Peak	Spacewatch	MAS	600 m	MPC · JPL
447108	2004 TD_{181}	—	October 7, 2004	Kitt Peak	Spacewatch	·	5.5 km	MPC · JPL
447109	2004 TS_{190}	—	September 23, 2004	Kitt Peak	Spacewatch	THM	1.8 km	MPC · JPL
447110	2004 TH_{198}	—	October 7, 2004	Kitt Peak	Spacewatch	·	1.1 km	MPC · JPL
447111	2004 TS_{198}	—	October 7, 2004	Kitt Peak	Spacewatch	·	3.1 km	MPC · JPL
447112	2004 TC_{206}	—	October 7, 2004	Kitt Peak	Spacewatch	TIR	3.2 km	MPC · JPL
447113	2004 TM_{237}	—	October 9, 2004	Socorro	LINEAR	·	2.4 km	MPC · JPL
447114	2004 TZ_{239}	—	October 9, 2004	Kitt Peak	Spacewatch	·	1.3 km	MPC · JPL
447115	2004 TJ_{252}	—	September 18, 2004	Socorro	LINEAR	·	2.3 km	MPC · JPL
447116	2004 TO_{252}	—	October 9, 2004	Kitt Peak	Spacewatch	·	2.5 km	MPC · JPL
447117	2004 TJ_{276}	—	October 9, 2004	Kitt Peak	Spacewatch	MAS	740 m	MPC · JPL
447118	2004 TP_{276}	—	October 9, 2004	Kitt Peak	Spacewatch	NYS	990 m	MPC · JPL
447119	2004 TR_{280}	—	October 10, 2004	Kitt Peak	Spacewatch	LIX	3.6 km	MPC · JPL
447120	2004 TR_{336}	—	October 10, 2004	Kitt Peak	Spacewatch	·	920 m	MPC · JPL
447121	2004 TK_{339}	—	October 13, 2004	Kitt Peak	Spacewatch	·	3.4 km	MPC · JPL
447122	2004 TM_{370}	—	October 13, 2004	Anderson Mesa	LONEOS	·	3.0 km	MPC · JPL
447123	2004 VF_{3}	—	October 9, 2004	Kitt Peak	Spacewatch	·	3.5 km	MPC · JPL
447124	2004 VQ_{8}	—	November 3, 2004	Anderson Mesa	LONEOS	·	2.5 km	MPC · JPL
447125	2004 VF_{19}	—	October 23, 2004	Kitt Peak	Spacewatch	·	3.7 km	MPC · JPL
447126	2004 VM_{27}	—	November 5, 2004	Kitt Peak	Spacewatch	HYG	2.5 km	MPC · JPL
447127	2004 VC_{38}	—	October 7, 2004	Kitt Peak	Spacewatch	LIX	3.8 km	MPC · JPL
447128	2004 VN_{42}	—	October 10, 2004	Kitt Peak	Spacewatch	·	2.9 km	MPC · JPL
447129	2004 VL_{45}	—	November 4, 2004	Kitt Peak	Spacewatch	·	4.6 km	MPC · JPL
447130	2004 XJ_{9}	—	December 2, 2004	Catalina	CSS	·	3.8 km	MPC · JPL
447131	2004 XJ_{11}	—	December 3, 2004	Palomar	NEAT	·	5.2 km	MPC · JPL
447132	2004 XZ_{29}	—	November 10, 2004	Kitt Peak	Spacewatch	·	3.2 km	MPC · JPL
447133	2004 XS_{93}	—	December 11, 2004	Kitt Peak	Spacewatch	·	990 m	MPC · JPL
447134	2004 XY_{103}	—	December 9, 2004	Kitt Peak	Spacewatch	·	1.1 km	MPC · JPL
447135	2004 XG_{112}	—	December 10, 2004	Kitt Peak	Spacewatch	T_{j} (2.99)	4.4 km	MPC · JPL
447136	2004 XN_{131}	—	December 11, 2004	Socorro	LINEAR	·	1.5 km	MPC · JPL
447137	2004 YK_{8}	—	December 18, 2004	Mount Lemmon	Mount Lemmon Survey	·	1.3 km	MPC · JPL
447138	2005 AB_{44}	—	January 15, 2005	Kitt Peak	Spacewatch	·	1.1 km	MPC · JPL
447139	2005 CP_{23}	—	January 8, 2005	Campo Imperatore	CINEOS	·	1.6 km	MPC · JPL
447140	2005 EO_{22}	—	March 3, 2005	Catalina	CSS	·	1.3 km	MPC · JPL
447141	2005 EP_{140}	—	March 2, 2005	Kitt Peak	Spacewatch	PHO	830 m	MPC · JPL
447142	2005 EQ_{203}	—	February 3, 2005	Socorro	LINEAR	·	1.3 km	MPC · JPL
447143	2005 EN_{210}	—	March 4, 2005	Kitt Peak	Spacewatch	3:2	6.0 km	MPC · JPL
447144	2005 EQ_{247}	—	March 12, 2005	Kitt Peak	Spacewatch	·	1.1 km	MPC · JPL
447145	2005 EX_{276}	—	March 8, 2005	Mount Lemmon	Mount Lemmon Survey	·	1.2 km	MPC · JPL
447146	2005 GZ_{25}	—	April 2, 2005	Mount Lemmon	Mount Lemmon Survey	·	530 m	MPC · JPL
447147	2005 GQ_{72}	—	April 4, 2005	Mount Lemmon	Mount Lemmon Survey	·	1.3 km	MPC · JPL
447148	2005 GY_{77}	—	March 30, 2005	Catalina	CSS	·	1.8 km	MPC · JPL
447149	2005 GG_{78}	—	April 6, 2005	Catalina	CSS	EUN	1.6 km	MPC · JPL
447150	2005 GE_{91}	—	April 6, 2005	Kitt Peak	Spacewatch	·	1.5 km	MPC · JPL
447151	2005 GR_{94}	—	April 6, 2005	Kitt Peak	Spacewatch	·	1.5 km	MPC · JPL
447152	2005 GJ_{177}	—	April 5, 2005	Mount Lemmon	Mount Lemmon Survey	·	1.1 km	MPC · JPL
447153	2005 GM_{177}	—	April 15, 2005	Kitt Peak	Spacewatch	·	1.5 km	MPC · JPL
447154	2005 GC_{178}	—	April 15, 2005	Anderson Mesa	LONEOS	JUN	990 m	MPC · JPL
447155	2005 HE_{10}	—	April 16, 2005	Kitt Peak	Spacewatch	·	1.9 km	MPC · JPL
447156	2005 HF_{10}	—	April 16, 2005	Kitt Peak	Spacewatch	·	1.9 km	MPC · JPL
447157	2005 JE_{1}	—	May 3, 2005	Catalina	CSS	·	1.8 km	MPC · JPL
447158	2005 JD_{17}	—	May 4, 2005	Anderson Mesa	LONEOS	EUN	1.4 km	MPC · JPL
447159	2005 JC_{20}	—	May 4, 2005	Catalina	CSS	JUN	1.3 km	MPC · JPL
447160	2005 JK_{71}	—	May 7, 2005	Kitt Peak	Spacewatch	·	2.1 km	MPC · JPL
447161	2005 JJ_{131}	—	April 30, 2005	Kitt Peak	Spacewatch	·	1.8 km	MPC · JPL
447162	2005 JN_{139}	—	May 3, 2005	Kitt Peak	Spacewatch	EUN	1.1 km	MPC · JPL
447163	2005 JQ_{143}	—	May 15, 2005	Mount Lemmon	Mount Lemmon Survey	ADE	2.6 km	MPC · JPL
447164	2005 JH_{162}	—	May 8, 2005	Kitt Peak	Spacewatch	·	2.0 km	MPC · JPL
447165	2005 JU_{167}	—	May 3, 2005	Kitt Peak	Spacewatch	·	1.5 km	MPC · JPL
447166	2005 KH_{3}	—	May 10, 2005	Kitt Peak	Spacewatch	·	1.7 km	MPC · JPL
447167	2005 LS_{18}	—	June 8, 2005	Kitt Peak	Spacewatch	·	1.9 km	MPC · JPL
447168	2005 MX_{50}	—	June 30, 2005	Kitt Peak	Spacewatch	·	1.8 km	MPC · JPL
447169	2005 NC_{28}	—	July 5, 2005	Palomar	NEAT	GEF	1.1 km	MPC · JPL
447170	2005 NW_{46}	—	June 18, 2005	Mount Lemmon	Mount Lemmon Survey	·	2.6 km	MPC · JPL
447171	2005 NJ_{65}	—	July 1, 2005	Kitt Peak	Spacewatch	·	1.8 km	MPC · JPL
447172	2005 NQ_{76}	—	July 10, 2005	Kitt Peak	Spacewatch	·	540 m	MPC · JPL
447173	2005 NP_{98}	—	June 13, 2005	Mount Lemmon	Mount Lemmon Survey	·	650 m	MPC · JPL
447174	2005 QH_{22}	—	August 27, 2005	Kitt Peak	Spacewatch	KOR	1.2 km	MPC · JPL
447175	2005 QZ_{50}	—	August 26, 2005	Palomar	NEAT	·	600 m	MPC · JPL
447176	2005 QQ_{56}	—	August 27, 2005	Anderson Mesa	LONEOS	H · slow	610 m	MPC · JPL
447177	2005 QU_{124}	—	August 28, 2005	Kitt Peak	Spacewatch	KOR	1.3 km	MPC · JPL
447178	2005 RO_{43}	—	September 3, 2005	Apache Point	A. C. Becker, Puckett, A. W., Kubica, J.	centaur	194 km	MPC · JPL
447179	2005 SH_{34}	—	September 23, 2005	Kitt Peak	Spacewatch	·	700 m	MPC · JPL
447180	2005 SN_{36}	—	September 24, 2005	Kitt Peak	Spacewatch	·	810 m	MPC · JPL
447181	2005 SO_{55}	—	September 25, 2005	Kitt Peak	Spacewatch	·	1.8 km	MPC · JPL
447182	2005 SK_{69}	—	September 27, 2005	Kitt Peak	Spacewatch	EOS	1.6 km	MPC · JPL
447183	2005 SN_{85}	—	September 24, 2005	Kitt Peak	Spacewatch	·	2.5 km	MPC · JPL
447184	2005 ST_{85}	—	September 24, 2005	Kitt Peak	Spacewatch	·	1.6 km	MPC · JPL
447185	2005 SP_{99}	—	September 25, 2005	Kitt Peak	Spacewatch	·	2.2 km	MPC · JPL
447186	2005 SG_{107}	—	September 1, 2005	Socorro	LINEAR	·	880 m	MPC · JPL
447187	2005 SM_{108}	—	September 26, 2005	Kitt Peak	Spacewatch	·	630 m	MPC · JPL
447188	2005 SW_{112}	—	September 23, 2005	Catalina	CSS	·	1.9 km	MPC · JPL
447189	2005 SF_{114}	—	September 27, 2005	Kitt Peak	Spacewatch	·	2.4 km	MPC · JPL
447190	2005 SP_{128}	—	September 29, 2005	Mount Lemmon	Mount Lemmon Survey	·	660 m	MPC · JPL
447191	2005 ST_{129}	—	September 29, 2005	Mount Lemmon	Mount Lemmon Survey	·	2.6 km	MPC · JPL
447192	2005 SV_{160}	—	September 27, 2005	Kitt Peak	Spacewatch	KOR	1.3 km	MPC · JPL
447193	2005 SL_{185}	—	September 29, 2005	Mount Lemmon	Mount Lemmon Survey	KOR	1.2 km	MPC · JPL
447194	2005 SH_{186}	—	September 23, 2005	Kitt Peak	Spacewatch	·	700 m	MPC · JPL
447195	2005 SV_{186}	—	September 29, 2005	Mount Lemmon	Mount Lemmon Survey	KOR	1.2 km	MPC · JPL
447196	2005 SP_{189}	—	September 29, 2005	Mount Lemmon	Mount Lemmon Survey	·	1.5 km	MPC · JPL
447197	2005 SV_{196}	—	September 30, 2005	Kitt Peak	Spacewatch	·	580 m	MPC · JPL
447198	2005 SN_{213}	—	September 30, 2005	Kitt Peak	Spacewatch	·	600 m	MPC · JPL
447199	2005 SX_{216}	—	September 30, 2005	Palomar	NEAT	·	2.8 km	MPC · JPL
447200	2005 SB_{239}	—	September 30, 2005	Mount Lemmon	Mount Lemmon Survey	·	2.0 km	MPC · JPL

== 447201–447300 ==
back to top

Designation			Discovery			Properties		Ref
Permanent	Provisional	Named after	Date	Site	Discoverer(s)	Category	Diam.	Ref
447201	2005 SV_{239}	—	September 25, 2005	Kitt Peak	Spacewatch	·	500 m	MPC · JPL
447202	2005 SM_{259}	—	September 24, 2005	Anderson Mesa	LONEOS	·	710 m	MPC · JPL
447203	2005 SF_{262}	—	September 23, 2005	Kitt Peak	Spacewatch	KOR	1.5 km	MPC · JPL
447204	2005 SZ_{262}	—	September 23, 2005	Kitt Peak	Spacewatch	·	2.2 km	MPC · JPL
447205	2005 TU_{7}	—	October 1, 2005	Kitt Peak	Spacewatch	EOS	1.5 km	MPC · JPL
447206	2005 TW_{25}	—	October 1, 2005	Mount Lemmon	Mount Lemmon Survey	·	1.6 km	MPC · JPL
447207	2005 TH_{48}	—	October 7, 2005	Goodricke-Pigott	R. A. Tucker	EOS	2.4 km	MPC · JPL
447208	2005 TG_{54}	—	October 1, 2005	Socorro	LINEAR	·	2.1 km	MPC · JPL
447209	2005 TF_{56}	—	October 1, 2005	Kitt Peak	Spacewatch	·	710 m	MPC · JPL
447210	2005 TN_{58}	—	October 1, 2005	Mount Lemmon	Mount Lemmon Survey	·	2.2 km	MPC · JPL
447211	2005 TX_{59}	—	October 2, 2005	Mount Lemmon	Mount Lemmon Survey	·	800 m	MPC · JPL
447212	2005 TY_{62}	—	October 4, 2005	Mount Lemmon	Mount Lemmon Survey	·	710 m	MPC · JPL
447213	2005 TP_{90}	—	October 6, 2005	Anderson Mesa	LONEOS	·	2.2 km	MPC · JPL
447214	2005 TY_{96}	—	October 6, 2005	Mount Lemmon	Mount Lemmon Survey	·	3.3 km	MPC · JPL
447215	2005 TN_{127}	—	October 7, 2005	Kitt Peak	Spacewatch	KOR	1.1 km	MPC · JPL
447216	2005 TC_{128}	—	October 7, 2005	Kitt Peak	Spacewatch	·	2.1 km	MPC · JPL
447217	2005 TH_{169}	—	October 9, 2005	Kitt Peak	Spacewatch	KOR	1.1 km	MPC · JPL
447218	2005 TP_{171}	—	October 10, 2005	Catalina	CSS	·	3.0 km	MPC · JPL
447219	2005 TK_{175}	—	October 1, 2005	Catalina	CSS	·	540 m	MPC · JPL
447220	2005 TO_{187}	—	October 6, 2005	Mount Lemmon	Mount Lemmon Survey	·	1.7 km	MPC · JPL
447221	2005 UO_{5}	—	October 27, 2005	Siding Spring	SSS	APO	240 m	MPC · JPL
447222	2005 UG_{15}	—	October 22, 2005	Kitt Peak	Spacewatch	·	630 m	MPC · JPL
447223	2005 UM_{16}	—	October 22, 2005	Kitt Peak	Spacewatch	·	570 m	MPC · JPL
447224	2005 UG_{27}	—	October 23, 2005	Catalina	CSS	·	3.0 km	MPC · JPL
447225	2005 UK_{35}	—	October 24, 2005	Kitt Peak	Spacewatch	EOS	1.5 km	MPC · JPL
447226	2005 UR_{78}	—	October 25, 2005	Anderson Mesa	LONEOS	(2076)	910 m	MPC · JPL
447227	2005 UZ_{81}	—	October 11, 2005	Kitt Peak	Spacewatch	KOR	980 m	MPC · JPL
447228	2005 UJ_{83}	—	September 29, 2005	Mount Lemmon	Mount Lemmon Survey	KOR	1.2 km	MPC · JPL
447229	2005 UZ_{95}	—	October 22, 2005	Kitt Peak	Spacewatch	·	580 m	MPC · JPL
447230	2005 UE_{97}	—	October 22, 2005	Kitt Peak	Spacewatch	·	1.4 km	MPC · JPL
447231	2005 UQ_{102}	—	October 22, 2005	Kitt Peak	Spacewatch	·	1.7 km	MPC · JPL
447232	2005 UP_{118}	—	October 24, 2005	Kitt Peak	Spacewatch	·	2.0 km	MPC · JPL
447233	2005 UL_{127}	—	October 24, 2005	Kitt Peak	Spacewatch	·	1.9 km	MPC · JPL
447234	2005 UB_{129}	—	October 24, 2005	Kitt Peak	Spacewatch	·	640 m	MPC · JPL
447235	2005 UR_{165}	—	October 12, 2005	Kitt Peak	Spacewatch	·	2.4 km	MPC · JPL
447236	2005 US_{165}	—	October 24, 2005	Kitt Peak	Spacewatch	·	1.5 km	MPC · JPL
447237	2005 UA_{176}	—	October 24, 2005	Kitt Peak	Spacewatch	·	1.7 km	MPC · JPL
447238	2005 US_{191}	—	October 27, 2005	Mount Lemmon	Mount Lemmon Survey	·	2.2 km	MPC · JPL
447239	2005 UK_{202}	—	October 25, 2005	Kitt Peak	Spacewatch	·	620 m	MPC · JPL
447240	2005 UV_{202}	—	October 25, 2005	Kitt Peak	Spacewatch	·	1.8 km	MPC · JPL
447241	2005 UW_{202}	—	October 25, 2005	Kitt Peak	Spacewatch	TEL	3.1 km	MPC · JPL
447242	2005 UK_{204}	—	October 25, 2005	Mount Lemmon	Mount Lemmon Survey	·	1.6 km	MPC · JPL
447243	2005 UM_{208}	—	October 27, 2005	Kitt Peak	Spacewatch	·	1.2 km	MPC · JPL
447244	2005 UO_{211}	—	October 27, 2005	Kitt Peak	Spacewatch	·	1.5 km	MPC · JPL
447245	2005 UV_{212}	—	October 27, 2005	Kitt Peak	Spacewatch	·	540 m	MPC · JPL
447246	2005 UX_{213}	—	October 22, 2005	Palomar	NEAT	·	4.3 km	MPC · JPL
447247	2005 UB_{220}	—	October 25, 2005	Kitt Peak	Spacewatch	·	520 m	MPC · JPL
447248	2005 UM_{221}	—	October 25, 2005	Kitt Peak	Spacewatch	·	520 m	MPC · JPL
447249	2005 UF_{236}	—	October 25, 2005	Kitt Peak	Spacewatch	·	640 m	MPC · JPL
447250	2005 UN_{243}	—	October 25, 2005	Kitt Peak	Spacewatch	·	800 m	MPC · JPL
447251	2005 UD_{248}	—	October 28, 2005	Mount Lemmon	Mount Lemmon Survey	·	1.6 km	MPC · JPL
447252	2005 UA_{255}	—	September 23, 2005	Kitt Peak	Spacewatch	·	740 m	MPC · JPL
447253	2005 UT_{262}	—	October 12, 2005	Kitt Peak	Spacewatch	·	1.9 km	MPC · JPL
447254	2005 UP_{280}	—	October 5, 2005	Kitt Peak	Spacewatch	·	1.5 km	MPC · JPL
447255	2005 UB_{294}	—	October 26, 2005	Kitt Peak	Spacewatch	·	2.6 km	MPC · JPL
447256	2005 UG_{297}	—	October 26, 2005	Kitt Peak	Spacewatch	·	1.6 km	MPC · JPL
447257	2005 UE_{299}	—	October 26, 2005	Kitt Peak	Spacewatch	·	670 m	MPC · JPL
447258	2005 UC_{311}	—	October 29, 2005	Mount Lemmon	Mount Lemmon Survey	·	1.4 km	MPC · JPL
447259	2005 UM_{320}	—	October 22, 2005	Kitt Peak	Spacewatch	·	2.1 km	MPC · JPL
447260	2005 UU_{323}	—	October 28, 2005	Mount Lemmon	Mount Lemmon Survey	·	3.0 km	MPC · JPL
447261	2005 UY_{324}	—	October 29, 2005	Mount Lemmon	Mount Lemmon Survey	·	660 m	MPC · JPL
447262	2005 UC_{325}	—	October 29, 2005	Mount Lemmon	Mount Lemmon Survey	·	580 m	MPC · JPL
447263	2005 UR_{331}	—	October 29, 2005	Kitt Peak	Spacewatch	·	1.4 km	MPC · JPL
447264	2005 UL_{346}	—	October 30, 2005	Kitt Peak	Spacewatch	·	4.4 km	MPC · JPL
447265	2005 UF_{347}	—	October 30, 2005	Kitt Peak	Spacewatch	·	610 m	MPC · JPL
447266	2005 UE_{348}	—	October 22, 2005	Kitt Peak	Spacewatch	·	850 m	MPC · JPL
447267	2005 UE_{366}	—	October 22, 2005	Kitt Peak	Spacewatch	·	630 m	MPC · JPL
447268	2005 UJ_{378}	—	October 28, 2005	Mount Lemmon	Mount Lemmon Survey	·	630 m	MPC · JPL
447269	2005 UE_{396}	—	October 25, 2005	Kitt Peak	Spacewatch	·	3.1 km	MPC · JPL
447270	2005 UJ_{424}	—	October 28, 2005	Kitt Peak	Spacewatch	EOS	1.5 km	MPC · JPL
447271	2005 UX_{426}	—	October 28, 2005	Kitt Peak	Spacewatch	·	1.7 km	MPC · JPL
447272	2005 UC_{429}	—	October 28, 2005	Mount Lemmon	Mount Lemmon Survey	·	1.6 km	MPC · JPL
447273	2005 UV_{433}	—	October 28, 2005	Kitt Peak	Spacewatch	·	560 m	MPC · JPL
447274	2005 UY_{442}	—	October 30, 2005	Catalina	CSS	·	550 m	MPC · JPL
447275	2005 UZ_{445}	—	October 31, 2005	Mount Lemmon	Mount Lemmon Survey	·	5.5 km	MPC · JPL
447276	2005 UO_{448}	—	October 30, 2005	Socorro	LINEAR	EOS	2.2 km	MPC · JPL
447277	2005 UK_{454}	—	September 29, 2005	Catalina	CSS	·	1.6 km	MPC · JPL
447278	2005 UA_{473}	—	October 30, 2005	Mount Lemmon	Mount Lemmon Survey	TEL	1.2 km	MPC · JPL
447279	2005 UD_{479}	—	October 28, 2005	Kitt Peak	Spacewatch	EOS	2.1 km	MPC · JPL
447280	2005 UL_{515}	—	October 22, 2005	Apache Point	A. C. Becker	BRA	1.2 km	MPC · JPL
447281	2005 VQ_{13}	—	October 2, 2005	Anderson Mesa	LONEOS	·	810 m	MPC · JPL
447282	2005 VJ_{20}	—	November 1, 2005	Kitt Peak	Spacewatch	EOS	1.4 km	MPC · JPL
447283	2005 VU_{49}	—	November 2, 2005	Socorro	LINEAR	PHO	960 m	MPC · JPL
447284	2005 VE_{67}	—	October 26, 2005	Kitt Peak	Spacewatch	·	560 m	MPC · JPL
447285	2005 VR_{67}	—	October 28, 2005	Kitt Peak	Spacewatch	·	3.6 km	MPC · JPL
447286	2005 WA_{2}	—	November 22, 2005	Wrightwood	J. W. Young	·	3.0 km	MPC · JPL
447287	2005 WU_{9}	—	November 21, 2005	Kitt Peak	Spacewatch	·	1.6 km	MPC · JPL
447288	2005 WE_{18}	—	October 27, 2005	Mount Lemmon	Mount Lemmon Survey	EOS	1.6 km	MPC · JPL
447289	2005 WE_{32}	—	November 21, 2005	Kitt Peak	Spacewatch	·	2.5 km	MPC · JPL
447290	2005 WN_{35}	—	November 22, 2005	Kitt Peak	Spacewatch	·	790 m	MPC · JPL
447291	2005 WH_{37}	—	November 22, 2005	Kitt Peak	Spacewatch	·	490 m	MPC · JPL
447292	2005 WZ_{37}	—	November 22, 2005	Kitt Peak	Spacewatch	TEL	1.2 km	MPC · JPL
447293	2005 WB_{48}	—	November 25, 2005	Kitt Peak	Spacewatch	·	2.7 km	MPC · JPL
447294	2005 WS_{62}	—	November 25, 2005	Catalina	CSS	·	3.3 km	MPC · JPL
447295	2005 WQ_{66}	—	November 22, 2005	Kitt Peak	Spacewatch	·	2.8 km	MPC · JPL
447296	2005 WR_{77}	—	November 25, 2005	Kitt Peak	Spacewatch	·	620 m	MPC · JPL
447297	2005 WM_{78}	—	November 25, 2005	Kitt Peak	Spacewatch	·	3.3 km	MPC · JPL
447298	2005 WR_{82}	—	November 25, 2005	Mount Lemmon	Mount Lemmon Survey	·	610 m	MPC · JPL
447299	2005 WM_{83}	—	November 25, 2005	Mount Lemmon	Mount Lemmon Survey	PHO	3.0 km	MPC · JPL
447300	2005 WL_{88}	—	November 28, 2005	Mount Lemmon	Mount Lemmon Survey	·	3.4 km	MPC · JPL

== 447301–447400 ==
back to top

Designation			Discovery			Properties		Ref
Permanent	Provisional	Named after	Date	Site	Discoverer(s)	Category	Diam.	Ref
447301	2005 WK_{103}	—	October 27, 2005	Anderson Mesa	LONEOS	·	2.5 km	MPC · JPL
447302	2005 WU_{114}	—	November 28, 2005	Mount Lemmon	Mount Lemmon Survey	·	1.0 km	MPC · JPL
447303	2005 WR_{138}	—	November 26, 2005	Mount Lemmon	Mount Lemmon Survey	·	630 m	MPC · JPL
447304	2005 WJ_{140}	—	October 29, 2005	Mount Lemmon	Mount Lemmon Survey	·	3.9 km	MPC · JPL
447305	2005 WA_{142}	—	November 29, 2005	Kitt Peak	Spacewatch	·	2.0 km	MPC · JPL
447306	2005 WR_{142}	—	November 1, 2005	Kitt Peak	Spacewatch	·	670 m	MPC · JPL
447307	2005 WR_{144}	—	October 28, 2005	Mount Lemmon	Mount Lemmon Survey	·	1.5 km	MPC · JPL
447308	2005 WX_{148}	—	October 30, 2005	Mount Lemmon	Mount Lemmon Survey	·	830 m	MPC · JPL
447309	2005 WS_{161}	—	October 29, 2005	Mount Lemmon	Mount Lemmon Survey	·	4.0 km	MPC · JPL
447310	2005 WE_{174}	—	November 1, 2005	Mount Lemmon	Mount Lemmon Survey	·	2.3 km	MPC · JPL
447311	2005 WG_{175}	—	November 30, 2005	Kitt Peak	Spacewatch	·	2.2 km	MPC · JPL
447312	2005 WF_{177}	—	November 30, 2005	Kitt Peak	Spacewatch	·	570 m	MPC · JPL
447313	2005 WE_{189}	—	November 30, 2005	Socorro	LINEAR	(2076)	850 m	MPC · JPL
447314	2005 XF_{6}	—	December 1, 2005	Palomar	NEAT	·	4.1 km	MPC · JPL
447315	2005 XG_{12}	—	October 30, 2005	Mount Lemmon	Mount Lemmon Survey	·	740 m	MPC · JPL
447316	2005 XL_{16}	—	December 1, 2005	Mount Lemmon	Mount Lemmon Survey	HYG	2.8 km	MPC · JPL
447317	2005 XX_{24}	—	December 2, 2005	Mount Lemmon	Mount Lemmon Survey	URS	3.2 km	MPC · JPL
447318	2005 XL_{48}	—	December 2, 2005	Mount Lemmon	Mount Lemmon Survey	·	2.9 km	MPC · JPL
447319	2005 XG_{50}	—	December 2, 2005	Kitt Peak	Spacewatch	·	1.9 km	MPC · JPL
447320	2005 XD_{51}	—	December 2, 2005	Kitt Peak	Spacewatch	·	770 m	MPC · JPL
447321	2005 XP_{68}	—	November 22, 2005	Kitt Peak	Spacewatch	·	3.4 km	MPC · JPL
447322	2005 XD_{77}	—	October 24, 2005	Kitt Peak	Spacewatch	·	2.0 km	MPC · JPL
447323	2005 XT_{85}	—	December 2, 2005	Kitt Peak	Spacewatch	·	890 m	MPC · JPL
447324	2005 XD_{86}	—	November 28, 2005	Catalina	CSS	·	3.1 km	MPC · JPL
447325	2005 XA_{105}	—	December 1, 2005	Kitt Peak	M. W. Buie	·	2.6 km	MPC · JPL
447326	2005 YC_{3}	—	December 21, 2005	Catalina	CSS	·	2.8 km	MPC · JPL
447327	2005 YX_{8}	—	December 22, 2005	Kitt Peak	Spacewatch	H	590 m	MPC · JPL
447328	2005 YP_{14}	—	December 22, 2005	Kitt Peak	Spacewatch	·	2.9 km	MPC · JPL
447329	2005 YW_{21}	—	December 24, 2005	Kitt Peak	Spacewatch	·	2.3 km	MPC · JPL
447330	2005 YE_{22}	—	December 24, 2005	Kitt Peak	Spacewatch	·	2.2 km	MPC · JPL
447331	2005 YF_{25}	—	December 24, 2005	Kitt Peak	Spacewatch	·	3.8 km	MPC · JPL
447332	2005 YM_{28}	—	December 22, 2005	Kitt Peak	Spacewatch	·	2.5 km	MPC · JPL
447333	2005 YE_{36}	—	December 25, 2005	Kitt Peak	Spacewatch	MAS	600 m	MPC · JPL
447334	2005 YA_{47}	—	December 25, 2005	Kitt Peak	Spacewatch	·	670 m	MPC · JPL
447335	2005 YR_{49}	—	December 24, 2005	Socorro	LINEAR	·	1.3 km	MPC · JPL
447336	2005 YF_{70}	—	December 26, 2005	Kitt Peak	Spacewatch	·	1.1 km	MPC · JPL
447337	2005 YZ_{83}	—	December 24, 2005	Kitt Peak	Spacewatch	·	710 m	MPC · JPL
447338	2005 YO_{88}	—	December 25, 2005	Mount Lemmon	Mount Lemmon Survey	·	2.4 km	MPC · JPL
447339	2005 YK_{95}	—	December 25, 2005	Kitt Peak	Spacewatch	·	3.9 km	MPC · JPL
447340	2005 YN_{114}	—	December 25, 2005	Kitt Peak	Spacewatch	·	1.3 km	MPC · JPL
447341	2005 YD_{134}	—	December 26, 2005	Kitt Peak	Spacewatch	·	1.0 km	MPC · JPL
447342	2005 YK_{148}	—	December 25, 2005	Kitt Peak	Spacewatch	·	970 m	MPC · JPL
447343	2005 YQ_{148}	—	December 25, 2005	Kitt Peak	Spacewatch	VER	2.8 km	MPC · JPL
447344	2005 YA_{149}	—	December 25, 2005	Kitt Peak	Spacewatch	·	940 m	MPC · JPL
447345	2005 YO_{150}	—	December 25, 2005	Kitt Peak	Spacewatch	·	1.9 km	MPC · JPL
447346	2005 YG_{164}	—	November 30, 2005	Kitt Peak	Spacewatch	·	600 m	MPC · JPL
447347	2005 YY_{180}	—	December 22, 2005	Catalina	CSS	·	3.4 km	MPC · JPL
447348	2005 YU_{188}	—	December 28, 2005	Mount Lemmon	Mount Lemmon Survey	·	570 m	MPC · JPL
447349	2005 YU_{190}	—	October 30, 2005	Mount Lemmon	Mount Lemmon Survey	·	2.7 km	MPC · JPL
447350	2005 YS_{191}	—	December 30, 2005	Kitt Peak	Spacewatch	NYS	970 m	MPC · JPL
447351	2005 YL_{201}	—	December 6, 2005	Kitt Peak	Spacewatch	·	4.0 km	MPC · JPL
447352	2005 YM_{227}	—	December 25, 2005	Kitt Peak	Spacewatch	·	900 m	MPC · JPL
447353	2005 YM_{235}	—	December 28, 2005	Mount Lemmon	Mount Lemmon Survey	THM	2.0 km	MPC · JPL
447354	2005 YR_{239}	—	December 29, 2005	Kitt Peak	Spacewatch	·	2.0 km	MPC · JPL
447355	2005 YG_{244}	—	December 30, 2005	Kitt Peak	Spacewatch	·	440 m	MPC · JPL
447356	2005 YU_{246}	—	December 30, 2005	Mount Lemmon	Mount Lemmon Survey	·	1.1 km	MPC · JPL
447357	2005 YY_{253}	—	November 26, 2005	Mount Lemmon	Mount Lemmon Survey	·	2.6 km	MPC · JPL
447358	2005 YR_{260}	—	December 24, 2005	Kitt Peak	Spacewatch	·	4.2 km	MPC · JPL
447359	2005 YL_{268}	—	December 25, 2005	Mount Lemmon	Mount Lemmon Survey	·	3.3 km	MPC · JPL
447360	2005 YK_{274}	—	December 30, 2005	Mount Lemmon	Mount Lemmon Survey	·	5.1 km	MPC · JPL
447361	2005 YJ_{281}	—	December 25, 2005	Kitt Peak	Spacewatch	·	800 m	MPC · JPL
447362	2006 AK_{3}	—	January 6, 2006	Socorro	LINEAR	T_{j} (2.96)	4.8 km	MPC · JPL
447363	2006 AN_{15}	—	January 5, 2006	Mount Lemmon	Mount Lemmon Survey	·	2.8 km	MPC · JPL
447364	2006 AG_{20}	—	September 30, 2005	Mount Lemmon	Mount Lemmon Survey	·	4.5 km	MPC · JPL
447365	2006 AV_{22}	—	December 22, 2005	Kitt Peak	Spacewatch	·	3.5 km	MPC · JPL
447366	2006 AJ_{23}	—	December 26, 2005	Mount Lemmon	Mount Lemmon Survey	·	2.0 km	MPC · JPL
447367	2006 AO_{34}	—	January 6, 2006	Catalina	CSS	·	4.9 km	MPC · JPL
447368	2006 AU_{38}	—	December 22, 2005	Kitt Peak	Spacewatch	·	1.3 km	MPC · JPL
447369	2006 AT_{40}	—	January 7, 2006	Mount Lemmon	Mount Lemmon Survey	THM	2.2 km	MPC · JPL
447370	2006 AQ_{44}	—	December 24, 2005	Kitt Peak	Spacewatch	·	3.3 km	MPC · JPL
447371	2006 AM_{48}	—	November 12, 2005	Kitt Peak	Spacewatch	·	2.0 km	MPC · JPL
447372	2006 AS_{48}	—	January 8, 2006	Mount Lemmon	Mount Lemmon Survey	·	4.3 km	MPC · JPL
447373	2006 AW_{50}	—	November 25, 2005	Mount Lemmon	Mount Lemmon Survey	EOS	2.1 km	MPC · JPL
447374	2006 AP_{53}	—	January 5, 2006	Kitt Peak	Spacewatch	NYS	980 m	MPC · JPL
447375	2006 AY_{55}	—	January 6, 2006	Mount Lemmon	Mount Lemmon Survey	·	1.0 km	MPC · JPL
447376	2006 AM_{56}	—	January 7, 2006	Mount Lemmon	Mount Lemmon Survey	·	810 m	MPC · JPL
447377	2006 AB_{67}	—	January 9, 2006	Kitt Peak	Spacewatch	EOS	2.1 km	MPC · JPL
447378	2006 AR_{81}	—	January 6, 2006	Anderson Mesa	LONEOS	·	2.6 km	MPC · JPL
447379	2006 AQ_{85}	—	January 7, 2006	Socorro	LINEAR	·	4.2 km	MPC · JPL
447380	2006 AD_{89}	—	January 5, 2006	Mount Lemmon	Mount Lemmon Survey	·	3.4 km	MPC · JPL
447381	2006 AB_{95}	—	January 9, 2006	Kitt Peak	Spacewatch	·	530 m	MPC · JPL
447382	2006 BX_{9}	—	January 20, 2006	Kitt Peak	Spacewatch	·	1.1 km	MPC · JPL
447383	2006 BB_{17}	—	November 26, 2005	Mount Lemmon	Mount Lemmon Survey	·	3.6 km	MPC · JPL
447384	2006 BX_{20}	—	January 22, 2006	Mount Lemmon	Mount Lemmon Survey	HYG	2.9 km	MPC · JPL
447385	2006 BY_{31}	—	November 4, 2005	Kitt Peak	Spacewatch	·	3.7 km	MPC · JPL
447386	2006 BB_{40}	—	January 20, 2006	Kitt Peak	Spacewatch	·	2.7 km	MPC · JPL
447387	2006 BY_{43}	—	January 6, 2006	Catalina	CSS	PHO	1.1 km	MPC · JPL
447388	2006 BV_{52}	—	January 25, 2006	Kitt Peak	Spacewatch	·	880 m	MPC · JPL
447389	2006 BK_{53}	—	January 25, 2006	Kitt Peak	Spacewatch	·	1.2 km	MPC · JPL
447390	2006 BA_{62}	—	January 22, 2006	Catalina	CSS	·	2.9 km	MPC · JPL
447391	2006 BU_{67}	—	January 23, 2006	Kitt Peak	Spacewatch	·	3.1 km	MPC · JPL
447392	2006 BR_{71}	—	January 23, 2006	Kitt Peak	Spacewatch	·	2.2 km	MPC · JPL
447393	2006 BC_{72}	—	January 23, 2006	Kitt Peak	Spacewatch	·	2.6 km	MPC · JPL
447394	2006 BX_{75}	—	January 23, 2006	Kitt Peak	Spacewatch	·	620 m	MPC · JPL
447395	2006 BG_{112}	—	January 25, 2006	Kitt Peak	Spacewatch	·	2.1 km	MPC · JPL
447396	2006 BH_{112}	—	January 25, 2006	Kitt Peak	Spacewatch	·	2.3 km	MPC · JPL
447397	2006 BK_{114}	—	January 25, 2006	Kitt Peak	Spacewatch	·	870 m	MPC · JPL
447398	2006 BV_{120}	—	January 26, 2006	Kitt Peak	Spacewatch	·	960 m	MPC · JPL
447399	2006 BC_{121}	—	January 26, 2006	Kitt Peak	Spacewatch	·	820 m	MPC · JPL
447400	2006 BX_{122}	—	January 26, 2006	Kitt Peak	Spacewatch	THM	1.9 km	MPC · JPL

== 447401–447500 ==
back to top

Designation			Discovery			Properties		Ref
Permanent	Provisional	Named after	Date	Site	Discoverer(s)	Category	Diam.	Ref
447401	2006 BS_{128}	—	January 26, 2006	Mount Lemmon	Mount Lemmon Survey	·	960 m	MPC · JPL
447402	2006 BV_{133}	—	January 26, 2006	Mount Lemmon	Mount Lemmon Survey	·	1.3 km	MPC · JPL
447403	2006 BX_{136}	—	January 28, 2006	Mount Lemmon	Mount Lemmon Survey	·	1.3 km	MPC · JPL
447404	2006 BT_{144}	—	January 23, 2006	Catalina	CSS	·	850 m	MPC · JPL
447405	2006 BN_{151}	—	January 29, 1995	Kitt Peak	Spacewatch	·	1.0 km	MPC · JPL
447406	2006 BV_{161}	—	January 26, 2006	Catalina	CSS	·	1.1 km	MPC · JPL
447407	2006 BW_{163}	—	January 5, 2006	Mount Lemmon	Mount Lemmon Survey	THM	2.0 km	MPC · JPL
447408	2006 BF_{168}	—	January 26, 2006	Catalina	CSS	H	670 m	MPC · JPL
447409	2006 BE_{173}	—	December 30, 2005	Kitt Peak	Spacewatch	·	2.5 km	MPC · JPL
447410	2006 BB_{177}	—	January 27, 2006	Kitt Peak	Spacewatch	VER	2.5 km	MPC · JPL
447411	2006 BV_{185}	—	January 5, 2006	Mount Lemmon	Mount Lemmon Survey	·	3.6 km	MPC · JPL
447412	2006 BP_{192}	—	January 30, 2006	Kitt Peak	Spacewatch	T_{j} (2.96)	3.3 km	MPC · JPL
447413	2006 BL_{203}	—	December 25, 2005	Mount Lemmon	Mount Lemmon Survey	(2076)	820 m	MPC · JPL
447414	2006 BK_{207}	—	January 9, 2006	Kitt Peak	Spacewatch	·	2.6 km	MPC · JPL
447415	2006 BK_{208}	—	January 31, 2006	Catalina	CSS	H	550 m	MPC · JPL
447416	2006 BD_{237}	—	January 23, 2006	Kitt Peak	Spacewatch	NYS	1.2 km	MPC · JPL
447417	2006 BX_{238}	—	January 31, 2006	Mount Lemmon	Mount Lemmon Survey	·	1.9 km	MPC · JPL
447418	2006 BG_{256}	—	January 23, 2006	Kitt Peak	Spacewatch	·	1.0 km	MPC · JPL
447419	2006 BD_{257}	—	January 31, 2006	Kitt Peak	Spacewatch	·	1.0 km	MPC · JPL
447420	2006 BR_{278}	—	January 26, 2006	Kitt Peak	Spacewatch	·	3.0 km	MPC · JPL
447421	2006 BC_{280}	—	January 23, 2006	Kitt Peak	Spacewatch	EOS	1.8 km	MPC · JPL
447422	2006 CC_{24}	—	February 2, 2006	Kitt Peak	Spacewatch	·	590 m	MPC · JPL
447423	2006 CX_{39}	—	January 7, 2006	Mount Lemmon	Mount Lemmon Survey	·	2.0 km	MPC · JPL
447424	2006 CW_{48}	—	February 3, 2006	Kitt Peak	Spacewatch	·	1.2 km	MPC · JPL
447425	2006 CZ_{48}	—	January 23, 2006	Mount Lemmon	Mount Lemmon Survey	·	480 m	MPC · JPL
447426	2006 CD_{59}	—	February 6, 2006	Mount Lemmon	Mount Lemmon Survey	·	1.7 km	MPC · JPL
447427	2006 CB_{62}	—	February 7, 2006	Socorro	LINEAR	·	6.6 km	MPC · JPL
447428	2006 DH	—	February 17, 2006	Great Shefford	Birtwhistle, P.	·	2.5 km	MPC · JPL
447429	2006 DS_{16}	—	January 23, 2006	Kitt Peak	Spacewatch	NYS	1.1 km	MPC · JPL
447430	2006 DT_{31}	—	February 20, 2006	Mount Lemmon	Mount Lemmon Survey	·	1.1 km	MPC · JPL
447431	2006 DE_{42}	—	February 20, 2006	Kitt Peak	Spacewatch	·	570 m	MPC · JPL
447432	2006 DV_{105}	—	February 25, 2006	Mount Lemmon	Mount Lemmon Survey	·	930 m	MPC · JPL
447433	2006 DZ_{116}	—	February 27, 2006	Catalina	CSS	·	4.6 km	MPC · JPL
447434	2006 DJ_{148}	—	February 25, 2006	Kitt Peak	Spacewatch	·	1.0 km	MPC · JPL
447435	2006 DH_{163}	—	February 27, 2006	Mount Lemmon	Mount Lemmon Survey	·	710 m	MPC · JPL
447436	2006 DP_{182}	—	February 27, 2006	Mount Lemmon	Mount Lemmon Survey	·	860 m	MPC · JPL
447437	2006 DM_{184}	—	February 27, 2006	Mount Lemmon	Mount Lemmon Survey	·	2.8 km	MPC · JPL
447438	2006 DF_{190}	—	February 27, 2006	Kitt Peak	Spacewatch	·	1.6 km	MPC · JPL
447439	2006 DX_{204}	—	February 27, 2006	Catalina	CSS	·	2.7 km	MPC · JPL
447440	2006 DY_{209}	—	February 20, 2006	Kitt Peak	Spacewatch	MAS	650 m	MPC · JPL
447441	2006 DB_{214}	—	February 27, 2006	Catalina	CSS	PHO	1.3 km	MPC · JPL
447442	2006 DZ_{216}	—	February 21, 2006	Mount Lemmon	Mount Lemmon Survey	NYS	1.3 km	MPC · JPL
447443	2006 ET_{6}	—	March 2, 2006	Kitt Peak	Spacewatch	H	560 m	MPC · JPL
447444	2006 EJ_{9}	—	March 2, 2006	Kitt Peak	Spacewatch	·	850 m	MPC · JPL
447445	2006 EL_{12}	—	January 26, 2006	Mount Lemmon	Mount Lemmon Survey	NYS	960 m	MPC · JPL
447446	2006 EC_{32}	—	March 3, 2006	Mount Lemmon	Mount Lemmon Survey	·	980 m	MPC · JPL
447447	2006 EF_{36}	—	February 24, 2006	Kitt Peak	Spacewatch	·	2.8 km	MPC · JPL
447448	2006 EE_{37}	—	March 3, 2006	Mount Lemmon	Mount Lemmon Survey	NYS	810 m	MPC · JPL
447449	2006 ED_{72}	—	March 9, 2006	Kitt Peak	Spacewatch	·	2.6 km	MPC · JPL
447450	2006 FZ_{44}	—	March 24, 2006	Mount Lemmon	Mount Lemmon Survey	·	1.1 km	MPC · JPL
447451	2006 GV_{1}	—	April 2, 2006	Mount Lemmon	Mount Lemmon Survey	·	3.0 km	MPC · JPL
447452	2006 GE_{32}	—	April 6, 2006	Kitt Peak	Spacewatch	·	1.0 km	MPC · JPL
447453	2006 HS_{12}	—	April 19, 2006	Mount Lemmon	Mount Lemmon Survey	H	660 m	MPC · JPL
447454	2006 HQ_{69}	—	April 24, 2006	Kitt Peak	Spacewatch	H	470 m	MPC · JPL
447455	2006 HJ_{101}	—	April 30, 2006	Kitt Peak	Spacewatch	·	1.5 km	MPC · JPL
447456	2006 HN_{153}	—	April 24, 2006	Kitt Peak	Spacewatch	·	1.7 km	MPC · JPL
447457	2006 JQ_{22}	—	May 2, 2006	Kitt Peak	Spacewatch	·	1.1 km	MPC · JPL
447458	2006 JB_{29}	—	May 3, 2006	Kitt Peak	Spacewatch	THB	4.2 km	MPC · JPL
447459	2006 JK_{38}	—	May 6, 2006	Kitt Peak	Spacewatch	H	490 m	MPC · JPL
447460	2006 JH_{55}	—	May 9, 2006	Mount Lemmon	Mount Lemmon Survey	·	1.6 km	MPC · JPL
447461	2006 JS_{57}	—	May 8, 2006	Mount Lemmon	Mount Lemmon Survey	·	1.2 km	MPC · JPL
447462	2006 KO_{95}	—	May 9, 2006	Mount Lemmon	Mount Lemmon Survey	ADE	1.3 km	MPC · JPL
447463	2006 MU_{4}	—	June 2, 2006	Kitt Peak	Spacewatch	EUN	770 m	MPC · JPL
447464	2006 NU	—	July 1, 2006	Uccle	E. W. Elst, H. Debehogne	·	1.2 km	MPC · JPL
447465	2006 PH_{15}	—	August 15, 2006	Palomar	NEAT	ADE	2.1 km	MPC · JPL
447466	2006 QJ_{4}	—	August 18, 2006	Kitt Peak	Spacewatch	·	1.5 km	MPC · JPL
447467	2006 QF_{5}	—	August 19, 2006	Kitt Peak	Spacewatch	·	1.6 km	MPC · JPL
447468	2006 QK_{5}	—	August 19, 2006	Kitt Peak	Spacewatch	·	1.4 km	MPC · JPL
447469	2006 QC_{25}	—	August 18, 2006	Anderson Mesa	LONEOS	·	1.3 km	MPC · JPL
447470	2006 QE_{38}	—	August 16, 2006	Siding Spring	SSS	·	1.7 km	MPC · JPL
447471	2006 QF_{38}	—	August 16, 2006	Siding Spring	SSS	·	2.0 km	MPC · JPL
447472	2006 QQ_{68}	—	August 21, 2006	Kitt Peak	Spacewatch	·	1.3 km	MPC · JPL
447473	2006 QN_{102}	—	August 19, 2006	Kitt Peak	Spacewatch	MRX	920 m	MPC · JPL
447474	2006 QB_{114}	—	August 25, 2006	Lulin	Lin, C.-S., Q. Ye	·	2.0 km	MPC · JPL
447475	2006 QL_{114}	—	August 29, 2006	Catalina	CSS	·	2.0 km	MPC · JPL
447476	2006 QH_{119}	—	August 28, 2006	Catalina	CSS	EUN	2.0 km	MPC · JPL
447477	2006 QG_{123}	—	August 29, 2006	Catalina	CSS	JUN	1.2 km	MPC · JPL
447478	2006 QL_{166}	—	August 29, 2006	Anderson Mesa	LONEOS	·	1.5 km	MPC · JPL
447479	2006 QD_{167}	—	August 30, 2006	Anderson Mesa	LONEOS	·	1.8 km	MPC · JPL
447480	2006 QA_{184}	—	August 18, 2006	Kitt Peak	Spacewatch	·	1.5 km	MPC · JPL
447481	2006 QC_{184}	—	August 27, 2006	Kitt Peak	Spacewatch	·	1.8 km	MPC · JPL
447482	2006 RL_{20}	—	August 31, 2006	Socorro	LINEAR	·	1.7 km	MPC · JPL
447483	2006 RV_{31}	—	September 15, 2006	Kitt Peak	Spacewatch	·	1.3 km	MPC · JPL
447484	2006 RU_{32}	—	September 15, 2006	Kitt Peak	Spacewatch	·	1.4 km	MPC · JPL
447485	2006 RV_{32}	—	August 30, 2006	Anderson Mesa	LONEOS	·	1.8 km	MPC · JPL
447486	2006 RM_{45}	—	September 14, 2006	Kitt Peak	Spacewatch	·	1.5 km	MPC · JPL
447487	2006 RY_{48}	—	September 14, 2006	Kitt Peak	Spacewatch	·	1.6 km	MPC · JPL
447488	2006 RR_{49}	—	September 14, 2006	Kitt Peak	Spacewatch	·	1.3 km	MPC · JPL
447489	2006 RY_{50}	—	September 14, 2006	Kitt Peak	Spacewatch	·	1.8 km	MPC · JPL
447490	2006 RN_{51}	—	September 14, 2006	Kitt Peak	Spacewatch	·	1.7 km	MPC · JPL
447491	2006 RX_{51}	—	September 14, 2006	Kitt Peak	Spacewatch	·	1.4 km	MPC · JPL
447492	2006 RC_{61}	—	September 15, 2006	Goodricke-Pigott	R. A. Tucker	·	2.5 km	MPC · JPL
447493	2006 RG_{71}	—	September 15, 2006	Kitt Peak	Spacewatch	·	2.3 km	MPC · JPL
447494	2006 RK_{71}	—	September 15, 2006	Kitt Peak	Spacewatch	·	1.4 km	MPC · JPL
447495	2006 RO_{74}	—	September 15, 2006	Kitt Peak	Spacewatch	·	1.4 km	MPC · JPL
447496	2006 RO_{80}	—	September 15, 2006	Kitt Peak	Spacewatch	·	1.3 km	MPC · JPL
447497	2006 RS_{80}	—	July 22, 2006	Mount Lemmon	Mount Lemmon Survey	·	1.6 km	MPC · JPL
447498	2006 RZ_{82}	—	September 15, 2006	Kitt Peak	Spacewatch	·	1.3 km	MPC · JPL
447499	2006 RQ_{89}	—	September 15, 2006	Kitt Peak	Spacewatch	·	2.0 km	MPC · JPL
447500	2006 RF_{97}	—	September 15, 2006	Kitt Peak	Spacewatch	·	1.9 km	MPC · JPL

== 447501–447600 ==
back to top

Designation			Discovery			Properties		Ref
Permanent	Provisional	Named after	Date	Site	Discoverer(s)	Category	Diam.	Ref
447501	2006 RL_{101}	—	September 14, 2006	Catalina	CSS	JUN	960 m	MPC · JPL
447502	2006 RV_{121}	—	September 15, 2006	Kitt Peak	Spacewatch	·	1.7 km	MPC · JPL
447503	2006 SB_{14}	—	September 17, 2006	Kitt Peak	Spacewatch	·	1.5 km	MPC · JPL
447504	2006 SH_{15}	—	September 17, 2006	Catalina	CSS	·	1.7 km	MPC · JPL
447505	2006 SH_{16}	—	September 17, 2006	Catalina	CSS	·	1.9 km	MPC · JPL
447506	2006 SJ_{41}	—	September 18, 2006	Catalina	CSS	·	1.7 km	MPC · JPL
447507	2006 SK_{49}	—	September 19, 2006	Anderson Mesa	LONEOS	·	2.7 km	MPC · JPL
447508	2006 SQ_{53}	—	September 16, 2006	Catalina	CSS	·	2.3 km	MPC · JPL
447509	2006 SK_{54}	—	September 17, 2006	Catalina	CSS	JUN	1.6 km	MPC · JPL
447510	2006 SK_{62}	—	September 18, 2006	Anderson Mesa	LONEOS	·	1.5 km	MPC · JPL
447511	2006 SV_{62}	—	September 18, 2006	Catalina	CSS	JUN	1.5 km	MPC · JPL
447512	2006 SR_{74}	—	September 19, 2006	Kitt Peak	Spacewatch	MRX	990 m	MPC · JPL
447513	2006 SW_{78}	—	September 16, 2006	Catalina	CSS	·	2.2 km	MPC · JPL
447514	2006 SC_{79}	—	September 17, 2006	Catalina	CSS	·	2.5 km	MPC · JPL
447515	2006 SK_{79}	—	September 17, 2006	Kitt Peak	Spacewatch	·	1.3 km	MPC · JPL
447516	2006 SX_{92}	—	September 18, 2006	Kitt Peak	Spacewatch	·	1.5 km	MPC · JPL
447517	2006 SK_{96}	—	September 18, 2006	Kitt Peak	Spacewatch	·	1.5 km	MPC · JPL
447518	2006 SW_{107}	—	July 21, 2006	Mount Lemmon	Mount Lemmon Survey	JUN	1.0 km	MPC · JPL
447519	2006 SK_{110}	—	August 28, 2006	Anderson Mesa	LONEOS	·	1.9 km	MPC · JPL
447520	2006 SD_{118}	—	September 18, 2006	Kitt Peak	Spacewatch	·	1.8 km	MPC · JPL
447521	2006 SB_{124}	—	September 19, 2006	Catalina	CSS	·	1.7 km	MPC · JPL
447522	2006 SH_{125}	—	August 21, 2006	Kitt Peak	Spacewatch	WIT	970 m	MPC · JPL
447523	2006 SS_{126}	—	August 28, 2006	Anderson Mesa	LONEOS	·	2.2 km	MPC · JPL
447524	2006 SL_{127}	—	December 31, 2002	Socorro	LINEAR	·	1.5 km	MPC · JPL
447525	2006 SY_{128}	—	September 17, 2006	Catalina	CSS	EUN	2.3 km	MPC · JPL
447526	2006 SF_{139}	—	September 21, 2006	Anderson Mesa	LONEOS	·	2.0 km	MPC · JPL
447527	2006 SC_{141}	—	September 25, 2006	Anderson Mesa	LONEOS	·	1.7 km	MPC · JPL
447528	2006 SS_{159}	—	September 23, 2006	Kitt Peak	Spacewatch	·	1.7 km	MPC · JPL
447529	2006 SE_{165}	—	September 25, 2006	Kitt Peak	Spacewatch	·	1.5 km	MPC · JPL
447530	2006 SC_{170}	—	September 25, 2006	Kitt Peak	Spacewatch	·	1.6 km	MPC · JPL
447531	2006 SP_{174}	—	September 25, 2006	Mount Lemmon	Mount Lemmon Survey	·	1.5 km	MPC · JPL
447532	2006 SG_{200}	—	July 21, 2006	Mount Lemmon	Mount Lemmon Survey	·	1.7 km	MPC · JPL
447533	2006 SW_{216}	—	September 27, 2006	Mount Lemmon	Mount Lemmon Survey	·	2.0 km	MPC · JPL
447534	2006 SP_{227}	—	September 26, 2006	Kitt Peak	Spacewatch	·	1.8 km	MPC · JPL
447535	2006 SM_{230}	—	September 26, 2006	Kitt Peak	Spacewatch	·	1.7 km	MPC · JPL
447536	2006 SZ_{232}	—	September 26, 2006	Kitt Peak	Spacewatch	·	1.9 km	MPC · JPL
447537	2006 SC_{240}	—	September 18, 2006	Kitt Peak	Spacewatch	·	1.7 km	MPC · JPL
447538	2006 SE_{245}	—	September 18, 2006	Kitt Peak	Spacewatch	·	2.0 km	MPC · JPL
447539	2006 SD_{252}	—	September 26, 2006	Kitt Peak	Spacewatch	·	1.5 km	MPC · JPL
447540	2006 SJ_{253}	—	September 18, 2006	Kitt Peak	Spacewatch	(12739)	1.5 km	MPC · JPL
447541	2006 SG_{260}	—	September 26, 2006	Kitt Peak	Spacewatch	·	1.6 km	MPC · JPL
447542	2006 SQ_{262}	—	September 26, 2006	Mount Lemmon	Mount Lemmon Survey	·	1.7 km	MPC · JPL
447543	2006 SS_{262}	—	September 26, 2006	Mount Lemmon	Mount Lemmon Survey	·	1.7 km	MPC · JPL
447544	2006 SS_{286}	—	September 21, 2006	Anderson Mesa	LONEOS	·	2.0 km	MPC · JPL
447545	2006 SK_{287}	—	September 22, 2006	Anderson Mesa	LONEOS	·	1.9 km	MPC · JPL
447546	2006 SH_{289}	—	September 26, 2006	Catalina	CSS	·	2.1 km	MPC · JPL
447547	2006 SE_{292}	—	September 18, 2006	Kitt Peak	Spacewatch	·	1.7 km	MPC · JPL
447548	2006 SO_{292}	—	September 25, 2006	Kitt Peak	Spacewatch	·	1.5 km	MPC · JPL
447549	2006 SY_{299}	—	September 26, 2006	Mount Lemmon	Mount Lemmon Survey	·	1.4 km	MPC · JPL
447550	2006 SL_{307}	—	September 17, 2006	Kitt Peak	Spacewatch	·	1.7 km	MPC · JPL
447551	2006 SC_{317}	—	March 23, 2004	Kitt Peak	Spacewatch	·	1.6 km	MPC · JPL
447552	2006 SQ_{328}	—	September 27, 2006	Kitt Peak	Spacewatch	·	1.8 km	MPC · JPL
447553	2006 SP_{329}	—	September 27, 2006	Kitt Peak	Spacewatch	·	1.5 km	MPC · JPL
447554	2006 SL_{331}	—	September 28, 2006	Kitt Peak	Spacewatch	·	1.5 km	MPC · JPL
447555	2006 SP_{362}	—	September 30, 2006	Mount Lemmon	Mount Lemmon Survey	·	2.3 km	MPC · JPL
447556	2006 ST_{378}	—	September 18, 2006	Apache Point	A. C. Becker	·	1.5 km	MPC · JPL
447557	2006 SX_{384}	—	September 29, 2006	Apache Point	A. C. Becker	·	1.6 km	MPC · JPL
447558	2006 SO_{394}	—	September 14, 2006	Kitt Peak	Spacewatch	·	1.8 km	MPC · JPL
447559	2006 SS_{396}	—	September 18, 2006	Kitt Peak	Spacewatch	·	1.7 km	MPC · JPL
447560	2006 SU_{399}	—	September 18, 2006	Kitt Peak	Spacewatch	·	1.4 km	MPC · JPL
447561	2006 SK_{413}	—	September 26, 2006	Catalina	CSS	·	1.9 km	MPC · JPL
447562	2006 TM	—	October 2, 2006	Catalina	CSS	·	670 m	MPC · JPL
447563	2006 TG_{3}	—	October 2, 2006	Mount Lemmon	Mount Lemmon Survey	·	1.7 km	MPC · JPL
447564	2006 TS_{16}	—	October 11, 2006	Kitt Peak	Spacewatch	·	1.8 km	MPC · JPL
447565	2006 TJ_{19}	—	September 28, 2006	Mount Lemmon	Mount Lemmon Survey	·	1.9 km	MPC · JPL
447566	2006 TJ_{25}	—	October 12, 2006	Kitt Peak	Spacewatch	·	2.1 km	MPC · JPL
447567	2006 TU_{29}	—	October 12, 2006	Kitt Peak	Spacewatch	·	1.8 km	MPC · JPL
447568	2006 TO_{33}	—	October 12, 2006	Kitt Peak	Spacewatch	·	1.7 km	MPC · JPL
447569	2006 TJ_{59}	—	October 2, 2006	Mount Lemmon	Mount Lemmon Survey	·	2.0 km	MPC · JPL
447570	2006 TM_{65}	—	September 27, 2006	Catalina	CSS	GEF	1.2 km	MPC · JPL
447571	2006 TP_{65}	—	September 16, 2006	Catalina	CSS	·	2.0 km	MPC · JPL
447572	2006 TN_{66}	—	October 11, 2006	Palomar	NEAT	fast?	1.9 km	MPC · JPL
447573	2006 TO_{68}	—	September 17, 2006	Kitt Peak	Spacewatch	·	1.9 km	MPC · JPL
447574	2006 TF_{69}	—	October 11, 2006	Palomar	NEAT	·	2.2 km	MPC · JPL
447575	2006 TH_{84}	—	October 13, 2006	Kitt Peak	Spacewatch	·	2.7 km	MPC · JPL
447576	2006 TQ_{88}	—	October 13, 2006	Kitt Peak	Spacewatch	AGN	1.1 km	MPC · JPL
447577	2006 TD_{93}	—	September 20, 2006	Anderson Mesa	LONEOS	·	2.0 km	MPC · JPL
447578	2006 TS_{100}	—	October 15, 2006	Kitt Peak	Spacewatch	·	3.3 km	MPC · JPL
447579	2006 TE_{102}	—	October 15, 2006	Kitt Peak	Spacewatch	·	1.7 km	MPC · JPL
447580	2006 TN_{106}	—	October 15, 2006	Catalina	CSS	NEM	2.4 km	MPC · JPL
447581	2006 TO_{118}	—	October 3, 2006	Apache Point	A. C. Becker	NEM	2.0 km	MPC · JPL
447582	2006 TY_{118}	—	October 3, 2006	Apache Point	A. C. Becker	·	1.7 km	MPC · JPL
447583	2006 TQ_{121}	—	October 2, 2006	Mount Lemmon	Mount Lemmon Survey	·	1.9 km	MPC · JPL
447584	2006 TO_{123}	—	October 2, 2006	Mount Lemmon	Mount Lemmon Survey	615	1.3 km	MPC · JPL
447585	2006 UH_{21}	—	October 16, 2006	Kitt Peak	Spacewatch	·	1.8 km	MPC · JPL
447586	2006 UU_{25}	—	October 16, 2006	Kitt Peak	Spacewatch	·	1.4 km	MPC · JPL
447587	2006 UQ_{26}	—	October 16, 2006	Kitt Peak	Spacewatch	·	1.6 km	MPC · JPL
447588	2006 UA_{43}	—	October 16, 2006	Kitt Peak	Spacewatch	HOF	2.1 km	MPC · JPL
447589	2006 UN_{43}	—	October 12, 2006	Kitt Peak	Spacewatch	·	2.0 km	MPC · JPL
447590	2006 UW_{43}	—	October 16, 2006	Kitt Peak	Spacewatch	AGN	1.3 km	MPC · JPL
447591	2006 UF_{44}	—	October 16, 2006	Kitt Peak	Spacewatch	·	1.4 km	MPC · JPL
447592	2006 UC_{51}	—	October 17, 2006	Mount Lemmon	Mount Lemmon Survey	·	1.8 km	MPC · JPL
447593	2006 UK_{56}	—	October 18, 2006	Kitt Peak	Spacewatch	·	1.8 km	MPC · JPL
447594	2006 UM_{62}	—	April 16, 2005	Kitt Peak	Spacewatch	·	1.5 km	MPC · JPL
447595	2006 UL_{67}	—	October 16, 2006	Catalina	CSS	PAD	1.7 km	MPC · JPL
447596	2006 UW_{74}	—	October 17, 2006	Kitt Peak	Spacewatch	·	1.7 km	MPC · JPL
447597	2006 UG_{78}	—	September 28, 2006	Mount Lemmon	Mount Lemmon Survey	·	1.6 km	MPC · JPL
447598	2006 UG_{85}	—	October 17, 2006	Kitt Peak	Spacewatch	·	2.6 km	MPC · JPL
447599	2006 UL_{85}	—	October 17, 2006	Mount Lemmon	Mount Lemmon Survey	·	1.6 km	MPC · JPL
447600	2006 UY_{98}	—	October 2, 2006	Mount Lemmon	Mount Lemmon Survey	·	2.2 km	MPC · JPL

== 447601–447700 ==
back to top

Designation			Discovery			Properties		Ref
Permanent	Provisional	Named after	Date	Site	Discoverer(s)	Category	Diam.	Ref
447601	2006 UN_{109}	—	October 19, 2006	Kitt Peak	Spacewatch	·	2.3 km	MPC · JPL
447602	2006 UM_{111}	—	September 27, 2006	Catalina	CSS	·	1.5 km	MPC · JPL
447603	2006 UF_{115}	—	September 18, 2006	Kitt Peak	Spacewatch	EUN	1.1 km	MPC · JPL
447604	2006 UO_{116}	—	September 25, 2006	Kitt Peak	Spacewatch	·	1.9 km	MPC · JPL
447605	2006 UO_{123}	—	October 19, 2006	Kitt Peak	Spacewatch	(12739)	1.5 km	MPC · JPL
447606	2006 US_{123}	—	October 2, 2006	Kitt Peak	Spacewatch	·	1.6 km	MPC · JPL
447607	2006 UV_{125}	—	October 19, 2006	Kitt Peak	Spacewatch	·	1.5 km	MPC · JPL
447608	2006 UX_{127}	—	October 19, 2006	Kitt Peak	Spacewatch	·	1.3 km	MPC · JPL
447609	2006 UO_{132}	—	September 27, 2006	Mount Lemmon	Mount Lemmon Survey	·	1.8 km	MPC · JPL
447610	2006 UW_{132}	—	September 30, 2006	Mount Lemmon	Mount Lemmon Survey	·	1.8 km	MPC · JPL
447611	2006 UD_{139}	—	October 4, 2006	Mount Lemmon	Mount Lemmon Survey	·	2.0 km	MPC · JPL
447612	2006 UH_{140}	—	October 19, 2006	Kitt Peak	Spacewatch	DOR	1.9 km	MPC · JPL
447613	2006 UQ_{141}	—	October 19, 2006	Kitt Peak	Spacewatch	·	1.8 km	MPC · JPL
447614	2006 UN_{142}	—	October 4, 2006	Mount Lemmon	Mount Lemmon Survey	·	2.1 km	MPC · JPL
447615	2006 UV_{148}	—	October 20, 2006	Kitt Peak	Spacewatch	AST	1.5 km	MPC · JPL
447616	2006 UO_{149}	—	October 2, 2006	Kitt Peak	Spacewatch	EUN	1.1 km	MPC · JPL
447617	2006 UP_{161}	—	October 2, 2006	Mount Lemmon	Mount Lemmon Survey	HOF	2.4 km	MPC · JPL
447618	2006 UF_{162}	—	October 21, 2006	Mount Lemmon	Mount Lemmon Survey	·	1.5 km	MPC · JPL
447619	2006 UY_{176}	—	October 16, 2006	Catalina	CSS	·	1.8 km	MPC · JPL
447620	2006 UR_{188}	—	September 17, 2006	Catalina	CSS	JUN	1.3 km	MPC · JPL
447621	2006 UE_{200}	—	October 21, 2006	Catalina	CSS	EUN	1.7 km	MPC · JPL
447622	2006 UX_{213}	—	October 23, 2006	Kitt Peak	Spacewatch	BRA	1.2 km	MPC · JPL
447623	2006 UE_{216}	—	October 27, 2006	Mount Lemmon	Mount Lemmon Survey	·	1.7 km	MPC · JPL
447624	2006 UM_{218}	—	October 2, 2006	Mount Lemmon	Mount Lemmon Survey	·	1.9 km	MPC · JPL
447625	2006 UP_{224}	—	October 19, 2006	Catalina	CSS	·	1.8 km	MPC · JPL
447626	2006 UO_{234}	—	October 17, 2006	Catalina	CSS	·	1.7 km	MPC · JPL
447627	2006 UZ_{242}	—	October 27, 2006	Mount Lemmon	Mount Lemmon Survey	·	1.9 km	MPC · JPL
447628	2006 UX_{250}	—	October 27, 2006	Mount Lemmon	Mount Lemmon Survey	EUN	1.2 km	MPC · JPL
447629	2006 US_{260}	—	October 28, 2006	Mount Lemmon	Mount Lemmon Survey	·	1.5 km	MPC · JPL
447630	2006 UJ_{263}	—	September 30, 2006	Mount Lemmon	Mount Lemmon Survey	·	2.0 km	MPC · JPL
447631	2006 UM_{265}	—	October 27, 2006	Mount Lemmon	Mount Lemmon Survey	·	2.6 km	MPC · JPL
447632	2006 UW_{279}	—	October 28, 2006	Mount Lemmon	Mount Lemmon Survey	·	1.6 km	MPC · JPL
447633	2006 UY_{346}	—	October 31, 2006	Mount Lemmon	Mount Lemmon Survey	·	1.2 km	MPC · JPL
447634	2006 UJ_{359}	—	October 21, 2006	Mount Lemmon	Mount Lemmon Survey	AGN	1.0 km	MPC · JPL
447635	2006 VL_{3}	—	November 9, 2006	Kitt Peak	Spacewatch	·	2.0 km	MPC · JPL
447636	2006 VL_{9}	—	November 11, 2006	Catalina	CSS	(21344)	1.5 km	MPC · JPL
447637	2006 VN_{14}	—	November 9, 2006	Kitt Peak	Spacewatch	GEF	1.1 km	MPC · JPL
447638	2006 VR_{15}	—	November 9, 2006	Kitt Peak	Spacewatch	·	1.3 km	MPC · JPL
447639	2006 VV_{17}	—	October 13, 2006	Kitt Peak	Spacewatch	·	1.5 km	MPC · JPL
447640	2006 VO_{28}	—	November 10, 2006	Kitt Peak	Spacewatch	·	1.2 km	MPC · JPL
447641	2006 VQ_{49}	—	September 28, 2006	Mount Lemmon	Mount Lemmon Survey	·	1.9 km	MPC · JPL
447642	2006 VK_{54}	—	October 19, 2006	Mount Lemmon	Mount Lemmon Survey	·	2.0 km	MPC · JPL
447643	2006 VY_{58}	—	October 22, 2006	Mount Lemmon	Mount Lemmon Survey	·	2.0 km	MPC · JPL
447644	2006 VK_{61}	—	October 13, 2001	Kitt Peak	Spacewatch	KOR	1.0 km	MPC · JPL
447645	2006 VY_{62}	—	October 21, 2006	Mount Lemmon	Mount Lemmon Survey	·	1.7 km	MPC · JPL
447646	2006 VN_{63}	—	October 19, 2006	Mount Lemmon	Mount Lemmon Survey	·	2.6 km	MPC · JPL
447647	2006 VE_{69}	—	November 11, 2006	Catalina	CSS	·	2.1 km	MPC · JPL
447648	2006 VZ_{70}	—	November 11, 2006	Kitt Peak	Spacewatch	·	2.5 km	MPC · JPL
447649	2006 VX_{76}	—	November 12, 2006	Mount Lemmon	Mount Lemmon Survey	AGN	1.2 km	MPC · JPL
447650	2006 VS_{82}	—	November 13, 2006	Kitt Peak	Spacewatch	·	2.1 km	MPC · JPL
447651	2006 VS_{85}	—	November 14, 2006	Kitt Peak	Spacewatch	·	1.6 km	MPC · JPL
447652	2006 VT_{92}	—	November 15, 2006	Kitt Peak	Spacewatch	AGN	1.2 km	MPC · JPL
447653	2006 VE_{131}	—	October 31, 2006	Mount Lemmon	Mount Lemmon Survey	·	1.3 km	MPC · JPL
447654	2006 VB_{150}	—	October 16, 2006	Catalina	CSS	·	2.3 km	MPC · JPL
447655	2006 WA	—	November 16, 2006	Kitt Peak	Spacewatch	AMO	360 m	MPC · JPL
447656	2006 WZ_{8}	—	November 16, 2006	Kitt Peak	Spacewatch	·	2.1 km	MPC · JPL
447657	2006 WO_{10}	—	September 19, 2006	Catalina	CSS	·	2.5 km	MPC · JPL
447658	2006 WX_{15}	—	November 17, 2006	Kitt Peak	Spacewatch	DOR	2.0 km	MPC · JPL
447659	2006 WN_{17}	—	November 17, 2006	Mount Lemmon	Mount Lemmon Survey	AGN	990 m	MPC · JPL
447660	2006 WK_{37}	—	October 23, 2006	Mount Lemmon	Mount Lemmon Survey	AGN	1.1 km	MPC · JPL
447661	2006 WA_{53}	—	October 20, 2006	Catalina	CSS	·	3.0 km	MPC · JPL
447662	2006 WL_{57}	—	September 30, 2006	Kitt Peak	Spacewatch	·	2.2 km	MPC · JPL
447663	2006 WG_{83}	—	September 27, 2006	Mount Lemmon	Mount Lemmon Survey	EOS	2.1 km	MPC · JPL
447664	2006 WY_{93}	—	November 19, 2006	Kitt Peak	Spacewatch	·	2.0 km	MPC · JPL
447665	2006 WR_{94}	—	November 19, 2006	Kitt Peak	Spacewatch	·	1.3 km	MPC · JPL
447666	2006 WD_{174}	—	November 23, 2006	Kitt Peak	Spacewatch	KOR	1.1 km	MPC · JPL
447667	2006 WC_{185}	—	October 13, 2006	Kitt Peak	Spacewatch	PAD	1.6 km	MPC · JPL
447668	2006 WH_{200}	—	November 19, 2006	Kitt Peak	Spacewatch	·	1.8 km	MPC · JPL
447669	2006 WU_{205}	—	November 27, 2006	Kitt Peak	Spacewatch	·	1.6 km	MPC · JPL
447670	2006 XZ_{12}	—	December 1, 2006	Mount Lemmon	Mount Lemmon Survey	·	2.1 km	MPC · JPL
447671	2006 XD_{13}	—	December 10, 2006	Kitt Peak	Spacewatch	·	2.2 km	MPC · JPL
447672	2006 XO_{24}	—	October 22, 2006	Catalina	CSS	·	2.3 km	MPC · JPL
447673	2006 XL_{39}	—	December 12, 2006	Kitt Peak	Spacewatch	·	1.7 km	MPC · JPL
447674	2006 XA_{41}	—	November 25, 2006	Kitt Peak	Spacewatch	(13314)	1.7 km	MPC · JPL
447675	2006 XA_{64}	—	November 13, 2006	Catalina	CSS	·	1.5 km	MPC · JPL
447676	2006 XQ_{72}	—	December 13, 2006	Kitt Peak	Spacewatch	·	2.9 km	MPC · JPL
447677	2006 YU_{9}	—	December 21, 2006	Kitt Peak	Spacewatch	·	2.3 km	MPC · JPL
447678	2006 YX_{10}	—	November 18, 2006	Mount Lemmon	Mount Lemmon Survey	·	2.0 km	MPC · JPL
447679	2006 YC_{17}	—	November 27, 2006	Mount Lemmon	Mount Lemmon Survey	EOS	1.8 km	MPC · JPL
447680	2006 YW_{34}	—	December 21, 2006	Kitt Peak	Spacewatch	·	640 m	MPC · JPL
447681	2006 YX_{38}	—	December 21, 2006	Kitt Peak	Spacewatch	EOS	1.8 km	MPC · JPL
447682 Rambaldi	2007 AA_{20}	Rambaldi	January 15, 2007	Vallemare Borbona	V. S. Casulli	EOS	1.7 km	MPC · JPL
447683	2007 BB_{4}	—	December 13, 2006	Mount Lemmon	Mount Lemmon Survey	·	1.8 km	MPC · JPL
447684	2007 BA_{11}	—	January 17, 2007	Kitt Peak	Spacewatch	·	640 m	MPC · JPL
447685	2007 BD_{11}	—	January 17, 2007	Kitt Peak	Spacewatch	·	2.3 km	MPC · JPL
447686	2007 BX_{22}	—	January 24, 2007	Mount Lemmon	Mount Lemmon Survey	·	1.3 km	MPC · JPL
447687	2007 BE_{36}	—	January 24, 2007	Mount Lemmon	Mount Lemmon Survey	·	670 m	MPC · JPL
447688	2007 BX_{39}	—	January 24, 2007	Mount Lemmon	Mount Lemmon Survey	·	2.6 km	MPC · JPL
447689	2007 BP_{79}	—	January 28, 2007	Mount Lemmon	Mount Lemmon Survey	EOS	1.7 km	MPC · JPL
447690	2007 CN_{23}	—	February 7, 2007	Mount Lemmon	Mount Lemmon Survey	·	2.8 km	MPC · JPL
447691	2007 CH_{28}	—	February 6, 2007	Kitt Peak	Spacewatch	·	570 m	MPC · JPL
447692	2007 CX_{40}	—	February 7, 2007	Kitt Peak	Spacewatch	·	860 m	MPC · JPL
447693	2007 CA_{48}	—	February 10, 2007	Mount Lemmon	Mount Lemmon Survey	·	1.5 km	MPC · JPL
447694	2007 CH_{50}	—	November 1, 2006	Kitt Peak	Spacewatch	·	3.4 km	MPC · JPL
447695	2007 DO_{6}	—	February 17, 2007	Mount Lemmon	Mount Lemmon Survey	·	1.4 km	MPC · JPL
447696	2007 DB_{9}	—	January 27, 2007	Mount Lemmon	Mount Lemmon Survey	·	2.7 km	MPC · JPL
447697	2007 DV_{18}	—	January 28, 2007	Mount Lemmon	Mount Lemmon Survey	·	650 m	MPC · JPL
447698	2007 DN_{21}	—	January 28, 2007	Mount Lemmon	Mount Lemmon Survey	·	2.5 km	MPC · JPL
447699	2007 DQ_{55}	—	February 21, 2007	Kitt Peak	Spacewatch	·	2.9 km	MPC · JPL
447700	2007 DS_{59}	—	January 28, 2007	Mount Lemmon	Mount Lemmon Survey	·	2.3 km	MPC · JPL

== 447701–447800 ==
back to top

Designation			Discovery			Properties		Ref
Permanent	Provisional	Named after	Date	Site	Discoverer(s)	Category	Diam.	Ref
447701	2007 DY_{63}	—	January 28, 2007	Mount Lemmon	Mount Lemmon Survey	V	700 m	MPC · JPL
447702	2007 DX_{88}	—	February 23, 2007	Kitt Peak	Spacewatch	·	510 m	MPC · JPL
447703	2007 EH_{11}	—	March 9, 2007	Kitt Peak	Spacewatch	·	630 m	MPC · JPL
447704	2007 EP_{42}	—	March 9, 2007	Kitt Peak	Spacewatch	·	750 m	MPC · JPL
447705	2007 EX_{45}	—	March 9, 2007	Mount Lemmon	Mount Lemmon Survey	·	2.1 km	MPC · JPL
447706	2007 EN_{60}	—	February 25, 2007	Kitt Peak	Spacewatch	·	2.0 km	MPC · JPL
447707	2007 EN_{78}	—	March 10, 2007	Mount Lemmon	Mount Lemmon Survey	·	2.7 km	MPC · JPL
447708	2007 ED_{79}	—	March 10, 2007	Kitt Peak	Spacewatch	·	750 m	MPC · JPL
447709	2007 EE_{81}	—	March 11, 2007	Kitt Peak	Spacewatch	·	540 m	MPC · JPL
447710	2007 EX_{114}	—	March 13, 2007	Mount Lemmon	Mount Lemmon Survey	·	700 m	MPC · JPL
447711	2007 EA_{120}	—	March 13, 2007	Mount Lemmon	Mount Lemmon Survey	EOS	2.3 km	MPC · JPL
447712	2007 EN_{130}	—	March 9, 2007	Mount Lemmon	Mount Lemmon Survey	·	2.5 km	MPC · JPL
447713	2007 EW_{132}	—	February 21, 2007	Kitt Peak	Spacewatch	·	2.3 km	MPC · JPL
447714	2007 EY_{132}	—	March 9, 2007	Mount Lemmon	Mount Lemmon Survey	EOS	1.8 km	MPC · JPL
447715	2007 EM_{133}	—	March 9, 2007	Mount Lemmon	Mount Lemmon Survey	·	1.5 km	MPC · JPL
447716	2007 EX_{135}	—	March 10, 2007	Mount Lemmon	Mount Lemmon Survey	·	540 m	MPC · JPL
447717	2007 EL_{146}	—	February 26, 2007	Mount Lemmon	Mount Lemmon Survey	·	670 m	MPC · JPL
447718	2007 EX_{150}	—	March 12, 2007	Mount Lemmon	Mount Lemmon Survey	·	1.5 km	MPC · JPL
447719	2007 EU_{151}	—	December 27, 2006	Mount Lemmon	Mount Lemmon Survey	·	3.9 km	MPC · JPL
447720	2007 EP_{154}	—	March 12, 2007	Kitt Peak	Spacewatch	EOS	1.6 km	MPC · JPL
447721	2007 ET_{165}	—	March 15, 2007	Mount Lemmon	Mount Lemmon Survey	·	2.8 km	MPC · JPL
447722	2007 EX_{165}	—	February 6, 2007	Kitt Peak	Spacewatch	·	2.5 km	MPC · JPL
447723	2007 EN_{168}	—	March 13, 2007	Kitt Peak	Spacewatch	·	2.2 km	MPC · JPL
447724	2007 EN_{183}	—	February 21, 2007	Kitt Peak	Spacewatch	TEL	990 m	MPC · JPL
447725	2007 ET_{192}	—	March 14, 2007	Kitt Peak	Spacewatch	·	600 m	MPC · JPL
447726	2007 EX_{195}	—	March 15, 2007	Mount Lemmon	Mount Lemmon Survey	·	2.0 km	MPC · JPL
447727	2007 EB_{200}	—	March 11, 2007	Kitt Peak	Spacewatch	·	650 m	MPC · JPL
447728	2007 EM_{208}	—	March 14, 2007	Mount Lemmon	Mount Lemmon Survey	·	3.4 km	MPC · JPL
447729	2007 EH_{209}	—	February 23, 2007	Mount Lemmon	Mount Lemmon Survey	·	2.4 km	MPC · JPL
447730	2007 EA_{217}	—	February 25, 2007	Mount Lemmon	Mount Lemmon Survey	·	2.7 km	MPC · JPL
447731	2007 EF_{217}	—	March 10, 2007	Mount Lemmon	Mount Lemmon Survey	·	2.4 km	MPC · JPL
447732	2007 EC_{219}	—	March 13, 2007	Kitt Peak	Spacewatch	·	2.1 km	MPC · JPL
447733	2007 FR_{7}	—	February 23, 2007	Mount Lemmon	Mount Lemmon Survey	·	2.7 km	MPC · JPL
447734	2007 FU_{17}	—	March 20, 2007	Catalina	CSS	·	3.2 km	MPC · JPL
447735	2007 FN_{24}	—	March 20, 2007	Mount Lemmon	Mount Lemmon Survey	·	620 m	MPC · JPL
447736	2007 FP_{40}	—	March 20, 2007	Mount Lemmon	Mount Lemmon Survey	·	740 m	MPC · JPL
447737	2007 FK_{46}	—	March 26, 2007	Mount Lemmon	Mount Lemmon Survey	·	2.9 km	MPC · JPL
447738	2007 GG_{8}	—	March 10, 2007	Kitt Peak	Spacewatch	·	2.9 km	MPC · JPL
447739	2007 GM_{25}	—	April 13, 2007	Siding Spring	SSS	·	850 m	MPC · JPL
447740	2007 GZ_{25}	—	March 16, 2007	Kitt Peak	Spacewatch	·	770 m	MPC · JPL
447741	2007 GH_{32}	—	March 20, 2007	Catalina	CSS	T_{j} (2.99)	3.6 km	MPC · JPL
447742	2007 GL_{38}	—	April 14, 2007	Kitt Peak	Spacewatch	·	1.1 km	MPC · JPL
447743	2007 GR_{64}	—	October 12, 1998	Kitt Peak	Spacewatch	·	3.1 km	MPC · JPL
447744	2007 GX_{69}	—	April 7, 2007	Mount Lemmon	Mount Lemmon Survey	(1338) (FLO)	450 m	MPC · JPL
447745	2007 HZ_{6}	—	April 16, 2007	Anderson Mesa	LONEOS	PHO	1.1 km	MPC · JPL
447746	2007 HG_{17}	—	April 16, 2007	Catalina	CSS	·	3.6 km	MPC · JPL
447747	2007 HT_{20}	—	April 18, 2007	Kitt Peak	Spacewatch	·	1.0 km	MPC · JPL
447748	2007 HT_{35}	—	April 11, 2007	Mount Lemmon	Mount Lemmon Survey	CLA	1.5 km	MPC · JPL
447749	2007 HU_{37}	—	April 20, 2007	Kitt Peak	Spacewatch	·	2.1 km	MPC · JPL
447750	2007 HS_{47}	—	September 17, 2004	Kitt Peak	Spacewatch	NYS	860 m	MPC · JPL
447751	2007 HS_{67}	—	April 23, 2007	Kitt Peak	Spacewatch	NYS	1.2 km	MPC · JPL
447752	2007 HA_{71}	—	January 6, 2006	Catalina	CSS	LIX	4.4 km	MPC · JPL
447753	2007 HL_{81}	—	March 13, 2007	Mount Lemmon	Mount Lemmon Survey	·	2.6 km	MPC · JPL
447754	2007 HA_{95}	—	April 19, 2007	Mount Lemmon	Mount Lemmon Survey	·	740 m	MPC · JPL
447755	2007 JX_{2}	—	May 9, 2007	Catalina	CSS	APO · PHA	410 m	MPC · JPL
447756	2007 JZ_{3}	—	March 16, 2007	Mount Lemmon	Mount Lemmon Survey	·	860 m	MPC · JPL
447757	2007 JA_{8}	—	April 18, 2007	Mount Lemmon	Mount Lemmon Survey	NYS	990 m	MPC · JPL
447758	2007 JZ_{14}	—	October 15, 2004	Mount Lemmon	Mount Lemmon Survey	·	4.1 km	MPC · JPL
447759	2007 JM_{19}	—	March 26, 2007	Kitt Peak	Spacewatch	V	560 m	MPC · JPL
447760	2007 JH_{24}	—	May 9, 2007	Kitt Peak	Spacewatch	·	1.6 km	MPC · JPL
447761	2007 JF_{25}	—	May 9, 2007	Mount Lemmon	Mount Lemmon Survey	·	620 m	MPC · JPL
447762	2007 JU_{26}	—	May 9, 2007	Kitt Peak	Spacewatch	·	820 m	MPC · JPL
447763	2007 LM_{9}	—	June 8, 2007	Kitt Peak	Spacewatch	·	1.0 km	MPC · JPL
447764	2007 LV_{10}	—	May 7, 2007	Kitt Peak	Spacewatch	NYS	1.1 km	MPC · JPL
447765	2007 LJ_{13}	—	June 10, 2007	Kitt Peak	Spacewatch	·	3.3 km	MPC · JPL
447766	2007 LE_{14}	—	June 10, 2007	Kitt Peak	Spacewatch	·	3.6 km	MPC · JPL
447767	2007 LG_{19}	—	June 12, 2007	Kitt Peak	Spacewatch	·	2.7 km	MPC · JPL
447768	2007 LP_{28}	—	May 11, 2007	Mount Lemmon	Mount Lemmon Survey	·	1.1 km	MPC · JPL
447769	2007 LE_{34}	—	April 25, 2007	Mount Lemmon	Mount Lemmon Survey	PHO	910 m	MPC · JPL
447770	2007 MU_{4}	—	June 9, 2007	Kitt Peak	Spacewatch	NYS	960 m	MPC · JPL
447771	2007 PW_{10}	—	August 10, 2007	Kitt Peak	Spacewatch	·	1.3 km	MPC · JPL
447772	2007 PC_{19}	—	August 9, 2007	Socorro	LINEAR	·	1.2 km	MPC · JPL
447773	2007 PZ_{45}	—	August 10, 2007	Kitt Peak	Spacewatch	·	1.1 km	MPC · JPL
447774	2007 RL_{13}	—	September 5, 2007	Siding Spring	K. Sárneczky, L. Kiss	NYS	1.2 km	MPC · JPL
447775	2007 RA_{83}	—	September 10, 2007	Mount Lemmon	Mount Lemmon Survey	·	870 m	MPC · JPL
447776	2007 RU_{92}	—	September 10, 2007	Mount Lemmon	Mount Lemmon Survey	·	960 m	MPC · JPL
447777	2007 RH_{93}	—	September 10, 2007	Mount Lemmon	Mount Lemmon Survey	H	480 m	MPC · JPL
447778	2007 RZ_{117}	—	September 11, 2007	Kitt Peak	Spacewatch	H	630 m	MPC · JPL
447779	2007 RP_{122}	—	September 12, 2007	Mount Lemmon	Mount Lemmon Survey	3:2	4.4 km	MPC · JPL
447780	2007 RZ_{146}	—	September 11, 2007	XuYi	PMO NEO Survey Program	·	1.3 km	MPC · JPL
447781	2007 RV_{188}	—	August 24, 2007	Kitt Peak	Spacewatch	·	1.3 km	MPC · JPL
447782	2007 RA_{195}	—	September 12, 2007	Kitt Peak	Spacewatch	3:2 · SHU	4.8 km	MPC · JPL
447783	2007 RC_{200}	—	September 13, 2007	Kitt Peak	Spacewatch	·	820 m	MPC · JPL
447784	2007 RE_{219}	—	May 8, 2002	Kitt Peak	Spacewatch	NYS	1.3 km	MPC · JPL
447785	2007 RQ_{221}	—	September 14, 2007	Mount Lemmon	Mount Lemmon Survey	3:2 · SHU	4.6 km	MPC · JPL
447786	2007 RO_{259}	—	September 14, 2007	Kitt Peak	Spacewatch	H	540 m	MPC · JPL
447787	2007 RF_{296}	—	September 14, 2007	Mount Lemmon	Mount Lemmon Survey	·	1.3 km	MPC · JPL
447788	2007 RU_{309}	—	September 15, 2007	Mount Lemmon	Mount Lemmon Survey	·	1.8 km	MPC · JPL
447789	2007 RZ_{316}	—	September 10, 2007	Mount Lemmon	Mount Lemmon Survey	·	1.2 km	MPC · JPL
447790	2007 RR_{317}	—	September 10, 2007	Mount Lemmon	Mount Lemmon Survey	KON	2.0 km	MPC · JPL
447791	2007 RO_{324}	—	September 9, 2007	Mount Lemmon	Mount Lemmon Survey	·	900 m	MPC · JPL
447792	2007 RG_{325}	—	September 14, 2007	Mount Lemmon	Mount Lemmon Survey	(5)	1.0 km	MPC · JPL
447793	2007 ST_{17}	—	September 12, 2007	Mount Lemmon	Mount Lemmon Survey	·	770 m	MPC · JPL
447794	2007 TZ_{6}	—	October 6, 2007	La Sagra	OAM	H	650 m	MPC · JPL
447795	2007 TH_{19}	—	October 8, 2007	Mount Lemmon	Mount Lemmon Survey	AMO +1km	930 m	MPC · JPL
447796	2007 TV_{26}	—	October 4, 2007	Kitt Peak	Spacewatch	·	1.2 km	MPC · JPL
447797	2007 TK_{47}	—	September 12, 2007	Kitt Peak	Spacewatch	·	1.2 km	MPC · JPL
447798	2007 TC_{56}	—	September 9, 2007	Mount Lemmon	Mount Lemmon Survey	·	1.2 km	MPC · JPL
447799	2007 TE_{59}	—	September 15, 2007	Mount Lemmon	Mount Lemmon Survey	·	1.0 km	MPC · JPL
447800	2007 TS_{78}	—	October 5, 2007	Kitt Peak	Spacewatch	·	920 m	MPC · JPL

== 447801–447900 ==
back to top

Designation			Discovery			Properties		Ref
Permanent	Provisional	Named after	Date	Site	Discoverer(s)	Category	Diam.	Ref
447801	2007 TV_{80}	—	October 7, 2007	Mount Lemmon	Mount Lemmon Survey	(5)	900 m	MPC · JPL
447802	2007 TK_{84}	—	October 8, 2007	Mount Lemmon	Mount Lemmon Survey	·	730 m	MPC · JPL
447803	2007 TT_{93}	—	October 6, 2007	Kitt Peak	Spacewatch	·	670 m	MPC · JPL
447804	2007 TS_{96}	—	October 8, 2007	Mount Lemmon	Mount Lemmon Survey	·	700 m	MPC · JPL
447805	2007 TY_{98}	—	October 8, 2007	Mount Lemmon	Mount Lemmon Survey	·	940 m	MPC · JPL
447806	2007 TC_{134}	—	October 7, 2007	Mount Lemmon	Mount Lemmon Survey	·	810 m	MPC · JPL
447807	2007 TD_{134}	—	October 7, 2007	Mount Lemmon	Mount Lemmon Survey	H	380 m	MPC · JPL
447808	2007 TJ_{145}	—	September 14, 2007	Mount Lemmon	Mount Lemmon Survey	·	1.2 km	MPC · JPL
447809	2007 TN_{149}	—	October 8, 2007	Socorro	LINEAR	(5)	820 m	MPC · JPL
447810	2007 TZ_{152}	—	October 11, 2007	Mount Lemmon	Mount Lemmon Survey	(5)	880 m	MPC · JPL
447811	2007 TV_{156}	—	October 9, 2007	Socorro	LINEAR	T_{j} (2.96)	3.8 km	MPC · JPL
447812	2007 TO_{193}	—	October 7, 2007	Mount Lemmon	Mount Lemmon Survey	·	810 m	MPC · JPL
447813	2007 TV_{210}	—	October 7, 2007	Kitt Peak	Spacewatch	·	1.0 km	MPC · JPL
447814	2007 TP_{214}	—	October 7, 2007	Catalina	CSS	H	660 m	MPC · JPL
447815	2007 TH_{232}	—	September 18, 2007	Mount Lemmon	Mount Lemmon Survey	·	880 m	MPC · JPL
447816	2007 TJ_{237}	—	October 9, 2007	Mount Lemmon	Mount Lemmon Survey	·	960 m	MPC · JPL
447817	2007 TU_{241}	—	September 15, 2007	Mount Lemmon	Mount Lemmon Survey	(5)	1.0 km	MPC · JPL
447818	2007 TL_{256}	—	September 8, 2007	Mount Lemmon	Mount Lemmon Survey	·	1.2 km	MPC · JPL
447819	2007 TN_{259}	—	October 10, 2007	Mount Lemmon	Mount Lemmon Survey	·	1.8 km	MPC · JPL
447820	2007 TS_{260}	—	October 10, 2007	Kitt Peak	Spacewatch	·	800 m	MPC · JPL
447821	2007 TW_{261}	—	October 10, 2007	Kitt Peak	Spacewatch	·	970 m	MPC · JPL
447822	2007 TA_{262}	—	October 10, 2007	Kitt Peak	Spacewatch	·	810 m	MPC · JPL
447823	2007 TV_{262}	—	October 10, 2007	Kitt Peak	Spacewatch	·	730 m	MPC · JPL
447824	2007 TO_{301}	—	October 4, 2007	Kitt Peak	Spacewatch	·	940 m	MPC · JPL
447825	2007 TH_{332}	—	October 11, 2007	Kitt Peak	Spacewatch	·	1.1 km	MPC · JPL
447826	2007 TU_{334}	—	October 11, 2007	Kitt Peak	Spacewatch	·	820 m	MPC · JPL
447827	2007 TW_{334}	—	October 11, 2007	Kitt Peak	Spacewatch	·	1.9 km	MPC · JPL
447828	2007 TL_{346}	—	October 13, 2007	Mount Lemmon	Mount Lemmon Survey	·	1.3 km	MPC · JPL
447829	2007 TV_{373}	—	September 10, 2007	Mount Lemmon	Mount Lemmon Survey	T_{j} (2.99) · 3:2 · SHU	5.7 km	MPC · JPL
447830	2007 TP_{379}	—	October 13, 2007	Catalina	CSS	H	520 m	MPC · JPL
447831	2007 TN_{388}	—	October 21, 2003	Kitt Peak	Spacewatch	·	750 m	MPC · JPL
447832	2007 TS_{404}	—	October 15, 2007	Kitt Peak	Spacewatch	·	950 m	MPC · JPL
447833	2007 TJ_{405}	—	October 15, 2007	Kitt Peak	Spacewatch	EUN	860 m	MPC · JPL
447834	2007 TF_{423}	—	October 4, 2007	Kitt Peak	Spacewatch	RAF	580 m	MPC · JPL
447835	2007 TZ_{449}	—	October 10, 2007	Mount Lemmon	Mount Lemmon Survey	·	1.8 km	MPC · JPL
447836	2007 TQ_{450}	—	October 12, 2007	Mount Lemmon	Mount Lemmon Survey	·	890 m	MPC · JPL
447837	2007 UA_{22}	—	October 16, 2007	Kitt Peak	Spacewatch	BRG	1.2 km	MPC · JPL
447838	2007 UA_{29}	—	October 18, 2007	Kitt Peak	Spacewatch	·	1.4 km	MPC · JPL
447839	2007 UP_{36}	—	October 19, 2007	Anderson Mesa	LONEOS	·	1.0 km	MPC · JPL
447840	2007 UL_{40}	—	September 12, 2007	Mount Lemmon	Mount Lemmon Survey	·	820 m	MPC · JPL
447841	2007 UM_{46}	—	October 20, 2007	Catalina	CSS	·	1.1 km	MPC · JPL
447842	2007 UT_{53}	—	October 11, 2007	Kitt Peak	Spacewatch	WIT	820 m	MPC · JPL
447843	2007 UE_{58}	—	October 10, 2007	Kitt Peak	Spacewatch	·	840 m	MPC · JPL
447844	2007 UR_{60}	—	October 30, 2007	Mount Lemmon	Mount Lemmon Survey	·	920 m	MPC · JPL
447845	2007 UA_{72}	—	November 30, 2003	Kitt Peak	Spacewatch	·	890 m	MPC · JPL
447846	2007 UF_{83}	—	October 15, 2007	Kitt Peak	Spacewatch	·	980 m	MPC · JPL
447847	2007 US_{83}	—	September 26, 2007	Mount Lemmon	Mount Lemmon Survey	KON	2.3 km	MPC · JPL
447848	2007 UV_{113}	—	October 31, 2007	Kitt Peak	Spacewatch	·	950 m	MPC · JPL
447849	2007 UG_{132}	—	October 19, 2007	Catalina	CSS	T_{j} (2.96) · 3:2	5.8 km	MPC · JPL
447850	2007 UJ_{137}	—	October 19, 2007	Mount Lemmon	Mount Lemmon Survey	(5)	1.1 km	MPC · JPL
447851	2007 UL_{138}	—	October 19, 2007	Catalina	CSS	RAF	880 m	MPC · JPL
447852	2007 UA_{139}	—	October 21, 2007	Catalina	CSS	·	1.7 km	MPC · JPL
447853	2007 UK_{139}	—	October 24, 2007	Mount Lemmon	Mount Lemmon Survey	·	960 m	MPC · JPL
447854	2007 UO_{139}	—	October 24, 2007	Mount Lemmon	Mount Lemmon Survey	KON	2.0 km	MPC · JPL
447855	2007 VT_{1}	—	November 2, 2007	Socorro	LINEAR	H	560 m	MPC · JPL
447856	2007 VE_{2}	—	November 2, 2007	Socorro	LINEAR	MAR	1.0 km	MPC · JPL
447857	2007 VU_{8}	—	November 2, 2007	Kitt Peak	Spacewatch	·	700 m	MPC · JPL
447858	2007 VN_{9}	—	November 2, 2007	Catalina	CSS	·	1.2 km	MPC · JPL
447859	2007 VM_{41}	—	October 9, 2007	Catalina	CSS	EUN	1.2 km	MPC · JPL
447860	2007 VN_{51}	—	November 1, 2007	Kitt Peak	Spacewatch	H	490 m	MPC · JPL
447861	2007 VM_{55}	—	November 1, 2007	Kitt Peak	Spacewatch	·	2.0 km	MPC · JPL
447862	2007 VB_{59}	—	October 16, 2007	Mount Lemmon	Mount Lemmon Survey	EUN	920 m	MPC · JPL
447863	2007 VG_{61}	—	November 1, 2007	Kitt Peak	Spacewatch	ADE	1.9 km	MPC · JPL
447864	2007 VV_{61}	—	September 14, 2007	Mount Lemmon	Mount Lemmon Survey	·	1.3 km	MPC · JPL
447865	2007 VL_{64}	—	November 1, 2007	Kitt Peak	Spacewatch	·	1.3 km	MPC · JPL
447866	2007 VC_{67}	—	November 2, 2007	Kitt Peak	Spacewatch	·	2.9 km	MPC · JPL
447867	2007 VS_{67}	—	September 10, 2007	Kitt Peak	Spacewatch	·	1.6 km	MPC · JPL
447868	2007 VA_{80}	—	October 16, 2007	Mount Lemmon	Mount Lemmon Survey	·	1.4 km	MPC · JPL
447869	2007 VP_{80}	—	October 14, 2007	Mount Lemmon	Mount Lemmon Survey	EUN	1.2 km	MPC · JPL
447870	2007 VX_{96}	—	November 1, 2007	Kitt Peak	Spacewatch	·	640 m	MPC · JPL
447871	2007 VT_{108}	—	November 3, 2007	Kitt Peak	Spacewatch	·	830 m	MPC · JPL
447872	2007 VA_{112}	—	October 15, 2007	Mount Lemmon	Mount Lemmon Survey	·	1.1 km	MPC · JPL
447873	2007 VS_{139}	—	October 17, 2007	Mount Lemmon	Mount Lemmon Survey	·	820 m	MPC · JPL
447874	2007 VX_{164}	—	November 5, 2007	Kitt Peak	Spacewatch	BRG	1.0 km	MPC · JPL
447875	2007 VQ_{168}	—	November 5, 2007	Kitt Peak	Spacewatch	·	1.9 km	MPC · JPL
447876	2007 VR_{170}	—	November 7, 2007	Kitt Peak	Spacewatch	·	870 m	MPC · JPL
447877	2007 VM_{180}	—	October 12, 2007	Kitt Peak	Spacewatch	·	1.0 km	MPC · JPL
447878	2007 VZ_{185}	—	September 10, 2007	Mount Lemmon	Mount Lemmon Survey	·	1.1 km	MPC · JPL
447879	2007 VU_{202}	—	November 7, 2007	Mount Lemmon	Mount Lemmon Survey	·	1.3 km	MPC · JPL
447880	2007 VN_{216}	—	November 9, 2007	Kitt Peak	Spacewatch	·	800 m	MPC · JPL
447881	2007 VG_{234}	—	November 4, 2007	Kitt Peak	Spacewatch	·	1.8 km	MPC · JPL
447882	2007 VV_{268}	—	November 12, 2007	Socorro	LINEAR	·	1.1 km	MPC · JPL
447883	2007 VL_{289}	—	October 9, 2007	Catalina	CSS	BRG	1.6 km	MPC · JPL
447884	2007 VB_{295}	—	November 15, 2007	Anderson Mesa	LONEOS	·	1.1 km	MPC · JPL
447885	2007 VE_{308}	—	November 5, 2007	Kitt Peak	Spacewatch	·	1.1 km	MPC · JPL
447886	2007 VN_{324}	—	November 7, 2007	Kitt Peak	Spacewatch	·	2.1 km	MPC · JPL
447887	2007 VU_{326}	—	November 4, 2007	Kitt Peak	Spacewatch	·	1.3 km	MPC · JPL
447888	2007 VJ_{328}	—	November 8, 2007	Mount Lemmon	Mount Lemmon Survey	·	1.1 km	MPC · JPL
447889	2007 VN_{330}	—	November 3, 2007	Mount Lemmon	Mount Lemmon Survey	·	2.2 km	MPC · JPL
447890	2007 VF_{334}	—	November 12, 2007	Mount Lemmon	Mount Lemmon Survey	·	1.8 km	MPC · JPL
447891	2007 VS_{334}	—	November 14, 2007	Kitt Peak	Spacewatch	·	1.4 km	MPC · JPL
447892	2007 WX_{10}	—	November 17, 2007	Catalina	CSS	·	750 m	MPC · JPL
447893	2007 WT_{24}	—	November 18, 2007	Mount Lemmon	Mount Lemmon Survey	·	920 m	MPC · JPL
447894	2007 WS_{25}	—	October 9, 2007	Mount Lemmon	Mount Lemmon Survey	·	1.0 km	MPC · JPL
447895	2007 WG_{35}	—	November 19, 2007	Mount Lemmon	Mount Lemmon Survey	(5)	1.0 km	MPC · JPL
447896	2007 WD_{39}	—	August 24, 2007	Kitt Peak	Spacewatch	·	1.3 km	MPC · JPL
447897	2007 WP_{49}	—	November 8, 2007	Kitt Peak	Spacewatch	·	1.7 km	MPC · JPL
447898	2007 WV_{58}	—	November 19, 2007	Kitt Peak	Spacewatch	·	1.3 km	MPC · JPL
447899	2007 WF_{61}	—	November 20, 2007	Mount Lemmon	Mount Lemmon Survey	·	1.5 km	MPC · JPL
447900	2007 XM_{3}	—	October 17, 2007	Mount Lemmon	Mount Lemmon Survey	H	510 m	MPC · JPL

== 447901–448000 ==
back to top

Designation			Discovery			Properties		Ref
Permanent	Provisional	Named after	Date	Site	Discoverer(s)	Category	Diam.	Ref
447901	2007 XN_{5}	—	December 4, 2007	Mount Lemmon	Mount Lemmon Survey	H	900 m	MPC · JPL
447902	2007 XE_{10}	—	November 13, 2007	Mount Lemmon	Mount Lemmon Survey	·	1.1 km	MPC · JPL
447903	2007 XJ_{20}	—	December 13, 2007	Socorro	LINEAR	APO	680 m	MPC · JPL
447904	2007 XL_{20}	—	December 12, 2007	La Sagra	OAM	(5)	1.2 km	MPC · JPL
447905	2007 XG_{26}	—	November 9, 2007	Mount Lemmon	Mount Lemmon Survey	·	1.4 km	MPC · JPL
447906	2007 XK_{35}	—	December 13, 2007	Socorro	LINEAR	·	1.5 km	MPC · JPL
447907	2007 XX_{39}	—	November 3, 2007	Mount Lemmon	Mount Lemmon Survey	·	1.4 km	MPC · JPL
447908	2007 XG_{46}	—	November 20, 2007	Catalina	CSS	·	1.7 km	MPC · JPL
447909	2007 XL_{51}	—	December 4, 2007	Catalina	CSS	·	1.0 km	MPC · JPL
447910	2007 XV_{54}	—	November 6, 2007	Kitt Peak	Spacewatch	·	1.8 km	MPC · JPL
447911	2007 XE_{56}	—	December 16, 2007	Catalina	CSS	·	2.4 km	MPC · JPL
447912	2007 YZ_{9}	—	November 11, 2007	Mount Lemmon	Mount Lemmon Survey	·	2.2 km	MPC · JPL
447913	2007 YZ_{18}	—	December 16, 2007	Kitt Peak	Spacewatch	(5)	1.1 km	MPC · JPL
447914	2007 YQ_{27}	—	November 3, 2007	Mount Lemmon	Mount Lemmon Survey	(5)	1.3 km	MPC · JPL
447915	2007 YB_{32}	—	August 30, 1998	Kitt Peak	Spacewatch	·	1.6 km	MPC · JPL
447916	2007 YG_{42}	—	December 30, 2007	Kitt Peak	Spacewatch	·	1.1 km	MPC · JPL
447917	2007 YT_{47}	—	December 30, 2007	La Sagra	OAM	·	950 m	MPC · JPL
447918	2007 YN_{49}	—	December 28, 2007	Kitt Peak	Spacewatch	·	2.0 km	MPC · JPL
447919	2007 YZ_{52}	—	August 21, 2006	Kitt Peak	Spacewatch	·	1.7 km	MPC · JPL
447920	2007 YO_{58}	—	December 30, 2007	Catalina	CSS	·	1.6 km	MPC · JPL
447921	2007 YJ_{65}	—	December 18, 2007	Mount Lemmon	Mount Lemmon Survey	·	1.3 km	MPC · JPL
447922	2007 YX_{69}	—	December 31, 2007	Mount Lemmon	Mount Lemmon Survey	·	1.4 km	MPC · JPL
447923	2007 YD_{71}	—	December 16, 2007	Catalina	CSS	·	1.3 km	MPC · JPL
447924	2007 YP_{73}	—	December 30, 2007	Kitt Peak	Spacewatch	·	1.6 km	MPC · JPL
447925	2008 AM_{2}	—	November 2, 2007	Mount Lemmon	Mount Lemmon Survey	·	1.5 km	MPC · JPL
447926	2008 AO_{4}	—	January 9, 2008	Lulin	LUSS	·	1.0 km	MPC · JPL
447927	2008 AV_{5}	—	October 10, 2007	Mount Lemmon	Mount Lemmon Survey	·	1.2 km	MPC · JPL
447928	2008 AZ_{7}	—	December 30, 2007	Mount Lemmon	Mount Lemmon Survey	·	1.6 km	MPC · JPL
447929	2008 AY_{20}	—	January 10, 2008	Mount Lemmon	Mount Lemmon Survey	TIR	3.1 km	MPC · JPL
447930	2008 AS_{22}	—	January 10, 2008	Mount Lemmon	Mount Lemmon Survey	AGN	970 m	MPC · JPL
447931	2008 AT_{29}	—	December 18, 2007	Mount Lemmon	Mount Lemmon Survey	·	2.4 km	MPC · JPL
447932	2008 AO_{38}	—	January 10, 2008	Mount Lemmon	Mount Lemmon Survey	·	1.4 km	MPC · JPL
447933	2008 AN_{41}	—	January 10, 2008	Catalina	CSS	(5)	980 m	MPC · JPL
447934	2008 AZ_{44}	—	December 31, 2007	Mount Lemmon	Mount Lemmon Survey	·	2.4 km	MPC · JPL
447935	2008 AQ_{52}	—	January 11, 2008	Kitt Peak	Spacewatch	·	1.3 km	MPC · JPL
447936	2008 AL_{58}	—	January 11, 2008	Kitt Peak	Spacewatch	MRX	920 m	MPC · JPL
447937	2008 AV_{61}	—	January 11, 2008	Catalina	CSS	·	2.1 km	MPC · JPL
447938	2008 AB_{80}	—	January 12, 2008	Kitt Peak	Spacewatch	·	1.5 km	MPC · JPL
447939	2008 AV_{82}	—	November 5, 2007	Mount Lemmon	Mount Lemmon Survey	·	1.2 km	MPC · JPL
447940	2008 AK_{83}	—	January 15, 2008	Mount Lemmon	Mount Lemmon Survey	·	1.4 km	MPC · JPL
447941	2008 AP_{93}	—	March 17, 2004	Kitt Peak	Spacewatch	·	1.9 km	MPC · JPL
447942	2008 AQ_{99}	—	January 14, 2008	Kitt Peak	Spacewatch	·	2.1 km	MPC · JPL
447943	2008 AV_{104}	—	January 15, 2008	Kitt Peak	Spacewatch	·	1.2 km	MPC · JPL
447944	2008 AD_{107}	—	December 30, 2007	Kitt Peak	Spacewatch	·	1.8 km	MPC · JPL
447945	2008 AR_{108}	—	December 31, 2007	Kitt Peak	Spacewatch	·	1.2 km	MPC · JPL
447946	2008 AR_{115}	—	January 10, 2008	Kitt Peak	Spacewatch	·	1.1 km	MPC · JPL
447947	2008 AC_{129}	—	January 13, 2008	Kitt Peak	Spacewatch	·	1.7 km	MPC · JPL
447948	2008 AD_{129}	—	January 13, 2008	Kitt Peak	Spacewatch	·	1.2 km	MPC · JPL
447949	2008 AU_{137}	—	January 11, 2008	Kitt Peak	Spacewatch	·	1.3 km	MPC · JPL
447950	2008 AX_{137}	—	January 11, 2008	Kitt Peak	Spacewatch	·	2.5 km	MPC · JPL
447951	2008 BM_{3}	—	January 11, 2008	Mount Lemmon	Mount Lemmon Survey	·	1.5 km	MPC · JPL
447952	2008 BW_{6}	—	January 16, 2008	Kitt Peak	Spacewatch	·	1.2 km	MPC · JPL
447953	2008 BU_{8}	—	December 19, 2007	Mount Lemmon	Mount Lemmon Survey	·	2.2 km	MPC · JPL
447954	2008 BB_{11}	—	January 18, 2008	Kitt Peak	Spacewatch	·	1.8 km	MPC · JPL
447955	2008 BT_{14}	—	January 28, 2008	Altschwendt	W. Ries	·	2.6 km	MPC · JPL
447956	2008 BB_{19}	—	January 28, 2008	Altschwendt	W. Ries	·	2.0 km	MPC · JPL
447957	2008 BK_{27}	—	November 5, 2007	Mount Lemmon	Mount Lemmon Survey	·	1.9 km	MPC · JPL
447958	2008 BZ_{35}	—	November 14, 2007	Mount Lemmon	Mount Lemmon Survey	(32418)	2.3 km	MPC · JPL
447959	2008 BN_{36}	—	December 16, 2007	Mount Lemmon	Mount Lemmon Survey	·	1.3 km	MPC · JPL
447960	2008 BU_{40}	—	January 29, 2008	La Sagra	OAM	(5)	1.4 km	MPC · JPL
447961	2008 BC_{42}	—	January 31, 2008	Catalina	CSS	·	1.6 km	MPC · JPL
447962	2008 BY_{43}	—	December 18, 2007	Mount Lemmon	Mount Lemmon Survey	·	2.0 km	MPC · JPL
447963	2008 BM_{50}	—	January 18, 2008	Kitt Peak	Spacewatch	·	2.0 km	MPC · JPL
447964	2008 CN_{8}	—	February 2, 2008	Catalina	CSS	·	1.6 km	MPC · JPL
447965	2008 CA_{14}	—	February 3, 2008	Kitt Peak	Spacewatch	·	1.1 km	MPC · JPL
447966	2008 CN_{42}	—	February 2, 2008	Kitt Peak	Spacewatch	·	1.7 km	MPC · JPL
447967	2008 CH_{47}	—	February 3, 2008	Kitt Peak	Spacewatch	·	4.2 km	MPC · JPL
447968	2008 CY_{65}	—	February 8, 2008	Mount Lemmon	Mount Lemmon Survey	HOF	2.1 km	MPC · JPL
447969	2008 CY_{67}	—	February 8, 2008	Mount Lemmon	Mount Lemmon Survey	·	2.4 km	MPC · JPL
447970	2008 CE_{73}	—	February 6, 2008	Catalina	CSS	·	1.9 km	MPC · JPL
447971	2008 CB_{86}	—	December 31, 2007	Mount Lemmon	Mount Lemmon Survey	·	1.5 km	MPC · JPL
447972	2008 CV_{97}	—	February 9, 2008	Kitt Peak	Spacewatch	WIT	960 m	MPC · JPL
447973	2008 CE_{103}	—	August 28, 2006	Kitt Peak	Spacewatch	·	1.3 km	MPC · JPL
447974	2008 CT_{107}	—	February 9, 2008	Catalina	CSS	·	1.2 km	MPC · JPL
447975	2008 CA_{115}	—	December 5, 2007	Mount Lemmon	Mount Lemmon Survey	·	2.0 km	MPC · JPL
447976	2008 CT_{116}	—	December 20, 2007	Mount Lemmon	Mount Lemmon Survey	·	1.7 km	MPC · JPL
447977	2008 CC_{119}	—	February 12, 2008	Socorro	LINEAR	AMO · critical	650 m	MPC · JPL
447978	2008 CW_{126}	—	February 8, 2008	Kitt Peak	Spacewatch	·	1.7 km	MPC · JPL
447979	2008 CG_{128}	—	February 8, 2008	Kitt Peak	Spacewatch	KOR	1.4 km	MPC · JPL
447980	2008 CL_{132}	—	February 8, 2008	Kitt Peak	Spacewatch	·	1.9 km	MPC · JPL
447981	2008 CX_{152}	—	February 3, 2008	Catalina	CSS	·	1.5 km	MPC · JPL
447982	2008 CG_{153}	—	February 1, 2008	Kitt Peak	Spacewatch	·	1.4 km	MPC · JPL
447983	2008 CG_{161}	—	February 9, 2008	Purple Mountain	PMO NEO Survey Program	WIT	1.3 km	MPC · JPL
447984	2008 CP_{163}	—	February 10, 2008	Catalina	CSS	·	1.5 km	MPC · JPL
447985	2008 CX_{165}	—	February 10, 2008	Mount Lemmon	Mount Lemmon Survey	·	2.0 km	MPC · JPL
447986	2008 CE_{172}	—	February 12, 2008	Kitt Peak	Spacewatch	·	2.3 km	MPC · JPL
447987	2008 CP_{175}	—	February 6, 2008	Socorro	LINEAR	·	1.4 km	MPC · JPL
447988	2008 CU_{177}	—	January 11, 2008	Catalina	CSS	·	2.5 km	MPC · JPL
447989	2008 CD_{187}	—	February 2, 2008	Catalina	CSS	·	1.4 km	MPC · JPL
447990	2008 CT_{192}	—	February 7, 2008	Kitt Peak	Spacewatch	·	1.5 km	MPC · JPL
447991	2008 CE_{195}	—	February 9, 2008	Mount Lemmon	Mount Lemmon Survey	·	2.1 km	MPC · JPL
447992	2008 CQ_{195}	—	February 2, 2008	Mount Lemmon	Mount Lemmon Survey	WIT	1.1 km	MPC · JPL
447993	2008 CD_{197}	—	February 8, 2008	Kitt Peak	Spacewatch	·	1.2 km	MPC · JPL
447994	2008 CS_{197}	—	February 9, 2008	Kitt Peak	Spacewatch	HOF	2.4 km	MPC · JPL
447995	2008 CH_{199}	—	February 13, 2008	Mount Lemmon	Mount Lemmon Survey	AGN	1.1 km	MPC · JPL
447996	2008 CO_{199}	—	February 13, 2008	Mount Lemmon	Mount Lemmon Survey	·	1.5 km	MPC · JPL
447997	2008 CR_{201}	—	February 8, 2008	Kitt Peak	Spacewatch	·	1.6 km	MPC · JPL
447998	2008 CE_{202}	—	February 2, 2008	Kitt Peak	Spacewatch	HOF	2.0 km	MPC · JPL
447999	2008 CM_{202}	—	February 7, 2008	Kitt Peak	Spacewatch	·	2.2 km	MPC · JPL
448000	2008 CB_{204}	—	February 14, 2008	Catalina	CSS	·	1.7 km	MPC · JPL

back to top

== Meaning of names ==
As minor planet discoveries are confirmed, they are given a permanent number by the IAU's Minor Planet Center (MPC), and the discoverers can then submit names for them, following the IAU's naming conventions. The list below concerns those minor planets in the specified number-range that have received names, and explains the meanings of those names.

Official naming citations of newly named small Solar System bodies are approved and published in a bulletin by IAU's Working Group for Small Bodies Nomenclature (WGSBN). Before May 2021, citations were published in MPC's Minor Planet Circulars for many decades. Recent citations can also be found on the JPL Small-Body Database (SBDB). Until his death in 2016, German astronomer Lutz D. Schmadel compiled these citations into the Dictionary of Minor Planet Names (DMP) and regularly updated the collection.

Based on Paul Herget's The Names of the Minor Planets, Schmadel also researched the unclear origin of numerous asteroids, most of which had been named prior to World War II. This article incorporates text from this source, which is in the public domain: SBDB New namings may only be added to this list below after official publication as the preannouncement of names is condemned. The WGSBN publishes a comprehensive guideline for the naming rules of non-cometary small Solar System bodies.

Named minor planet	Provisional	This minor planet was named for...	Ref · Catalog
447682 Rambaldi	2007 AA_{20}	Carlo Rambaldi (1925–2012), an Italian special effects artist and winner of three Academy awards for best visual effects for the feature movies King Kong (1976), Alien (1979) and E.T. the Extra-Terrestrial (1982).	IAU · 447682
