= List of minor planets: 487001–488000 =

The following is a partial list of minor planets, running from minor-planet number 487001 through 488000, inclusive. The primary data for this and other partial lists is based on JPL's "Small-Body Orbital Elements" and data available from the Minor Planet Center. Critical list information is also provided by the MPC, unless otherwise specified from Lowell Observatory. A detailed description of the table's columns and additional sources are given on the main page including a complete list of every page in this series, and a statistical break-up on the dynamical classification of minor planets.

Also see the summary list of all named bodies in numerical and alphabetical order, and the corresponding naming citations for the number range of this particular list. New namings may only be added to this list after official publication, as the preannouncement of names is condemned by the Working Group for Small Bodies Nomenclature of the International Astronomical Union.

Near-Earth obj.	MBA (inner)	MBA (outer)	Centaur
Mars-crosser	MBA (middle)	Jupiter trojan	Trans-Neptunian obj.
Unclassified

== 487001–487100 ==
Designation			Discovery			Properties		Ref
Permanent	Provisional	Named after	Date	Site	Discoverer(s)	Category	Diam.	Ref
487001	2014 NX_{56}	—	March 6, 2013	Haleakala	Pan-STARRS 1	·	2.3 km	MPC · JPL
487002	2014 NG_{57}	—	January 19, 2012	Haleakala	Pan-STARRS 1	·	2.2 km	MPC · JPL
487003	2014 NK_{60}	—	July 6, 2014	Haleakala	Pan-STARRS 1	·	3.4 km	MPC · JPL
487004	2014 ND_{62}	—	September 21, 2003	Kitt Peak	Spacewatch	·	1.4 km	MPC · JPL
487005	2014 NF_{62}	—	February 15, 2013	Haleakala	Pan-STARRS 1	EUN	1.1 km	MPC · JPL
487006	2014 NK_{62}	—	February 10, 2008	Kitt Peak	Spacewatch	·	1.9 km	MPC · JPL
487007	2014 NU_{62}	—	January 8, 2010	Mount Lemmon	Mount Lemmon Survey	·	710 m	MPC · JPL
487008	2014 OB	—	January 29, 2009	Mount Lemmon	Mount Lemmon Survey	·	1.3 km	MPC · JPL
487009	2014 OO	—	January 17, 2013	Kitt Peak	Spacewatch	·	1.5 km	MPC · JPL
487010	2014 OQ_{1}	—	July 2, 2014	Catalina	CSS	JUN	1.2 km	MPC · JPL
487011	2014 OK_{2}	—	May 6, 2014	Haleakala	Pan-STARRS 1	T_{j} (2.92)	4.3 km	MPC · JPL
487012	2014 OM_{3}	—	August 16, 2009	La Sagra	OAM	·	2.7 km	MPC · JPL
487013	2014 OM_{4}	—	June 2, 2014	Haleakala	Pan-STARRS 1	·	2.8 km	MPC · JPL
487014	2014 ON_{4}	—	December 3, 2010	Kitt Peak	Spacewatch	·	2.9 km	MPC · JPL
487015	2014 OQ_{4}	—	February 23, 2012	Mount Lemmon	Mount Lemmon Survey	·	1.9 km	MPC · JPL
487016	2014 OA_{5}	—	February 26, 2009	Kitt Peak	Spacewatch	·	990 m	MPC · JPL
487017	2014 OY_{11}	—	December 27, 2011	Mount Lemmon	Mount Lemmon Survey	·	2.4 km	MPC · JPL
487018	2014 OS_{12}	—	November 18, 2006	Kitt Peak	Spacewatch	·	1.4 km	MPC · JPL
487019	2014 OC_{14}	—	January 1, 2008	Kitt Peak	Spacewatch	·	1.4 km	MPC · JPL
487020	2014 OP_{15}	—	August 27, 1995	Kitt Peak	Spacewatch	·	1.2 km	MPC · JPL
487021	2014 OD_{18}	—	June 25, 2014	Mount Lemmon	Mount Lemmon Survey	·	3.0 km	MPC · JPL
487022	2014 OW_{18}	—	February 28, 2008	Mount Lemmon	Mount Lemmon Survey	·	1.6 km	MPC · JPL
487023	2014 OX_{18}	—	February 8, 2008	Kitt Peak	Spacewatch	·	1.4 km	MPC · JPL
487024	2014 OZ_{18}	—	September 13, 2004	Kitt Peak	Spacewatch	·	1.6 km	MPC · JPL
487025	2014 OD_{20}	—	July 2, 2014	Haleakala	Pan-STARRS 1	·	1.7 km	MPC · JPL
487026	2014 OT_{22}	—	March 5, 2006	Kitt Peak	Spacewatch	NYS	830 m	MPC · JPL
487027	2014 OF_{23}	—	December 26, 2005	Kitt Peak	Spacewatch	·	2.6 km	MPC · JPL
487028	2014 OK_{25}	—	May 16, 2009	Mount Lemmon	Mount Lemmon Survey	·	1.4 km	MPC · JPL
487029	2014 OE_{27}	—	December 24, 2011	Mount Lemmon	Mount Lemmon Survey	BRA	1.4 km	MPC · JPL
487030	2014 OJ_{30}	—	June 25, 2014	Mount Lemmon	Mount Lemmon Survey	·	2.7 km	MPC · JPL
487031	2014 OV_{30}	—	October 11, 2010	Mount Lemmon	Mount Lemmon Survey	·	1.6 km	MPC · JPL
487032	2014 OW_{30}	—	December 24, 2006	Kitt Peak	Spacewatch	·	1.7 km	MPC · JPL
487033	2014 OA_{34}	—	July 3, 2014	Haleakala	Pan-STARRS 1	·	1.1 km	MPC · JPL
487034	2014 OZ_{35}	—	December 31, 2007	Kitt Peak	Spacewatch	·	1.5 km	MPC · JPL
487035	2014 OV_{36}	—	May 15, 2009	Kitt Peak	Spacewatch	·	1.3 km	MPC · JPL
487036	2014 OG_{37}	—	June 29, 2014	Haleakala	Pan-STARRS 1	·	1.5 km	MPC · JPL
487037	2014 OF_{39}	—	October 1, 2005	Mount Lemmon	Mount Lemmon Survey	KOR	1.1 km	MPC · JPL
487038	2014 OT_{39}	—	December 2, 2010	Mount Lemmon	Mount Lemmon Survey	·	2.9 km	MPC · JPL
487039	2014 ON_{40}	—	July 3, 2014	Haleakala	Pan-STARRS 1	·	2.2 km	MPC · JPL
487040	2014 OG_{42}	—	January 26, 2012	Mount Lemmon	Mount Lemmon Survey	EOS	1.8 km	MPC · JPL
487041	2014 OP_{44}	—	January 21, 2012	Kitt Peak	Spacewatch	·	2.3 km	MPC · JPL
487042	2014 OM_{46}	—	September 19, 2010	Kitt Peak	Spacewatch	·	1.4 km	MPC · JPL
487043	2014 OP_{47}	—	January 21, 2013	Haleakala	Pan-STARRS 1	·	1.6 km	MPC · JPL
487044	2014 OB_{48}	—	April 10, 2013	Mount Lemmon	Mount Lemmon Survey	GEF	1.1 km	MPC · JPL
487045	2014 OS_{48}	—	March 23, 2006	Kitt Peak	Spacewatch	NYS	990 m	MPC · JPL
487046	2014 OW_{48}	—	November 17, 2006	Mount Lemmon	Mount Lemmon Survey	·	1.9 km	MPC · JPL
487047	2014 OP_{49}	—	June 27, 2014	Haleakala	Pan-STARRS 1	·	2.4 km	MPC · JPL
487048	2014 OW_{51}	—	July 25, 2014	Haleakala	Pan-STARRS 1	·	1.7 km	MPC · JPL
487049	2014 OW_{55}	—	September 23, 2009	Mount Lemmon	Mount Lemmon Survey	·	3.0 km	MPC · JPL
487050	2014 OD_{56}	—	July 25, 2014	Haleakala	Pan-STARRS 1	·	1.5 km	MPC · JPL
487051	2014 OR_{56}	—	February 3, 2012	Mount Lemmon	Mount Lemmon Survey	EOS	1.4 km	MPC · JPL
487052	2014 OP_{57}	—	June 27, 2014	Haleakala	Pan-STARRS 1	·	2.6 km	MPC · JPL
487053	2014 OJ_{58}	—	April 19, 2013	Haleakala	Pan-STARRS 1	·	2.9 km	MPC · JPL
487054	2014 OW_{58}	—	January 28, 2007	Mount Lemmon	Mount Lemmon Survey	·	2.3 km	MPC · JPL
487055	2014 OR_{65}	—	April 21, 2009	Kitt Peak	Spacewatch	·	1.4 km	MPC · JPL
487056	2014 OA_{73}	—	January 21, 2012	Haleakala	Pan-STARRS 1	EOS	2.3 km	MPC · JPL
487057	2014 OR_{79}	—	February 17, 2007	Kitt Peak	Spacewatch	TEL	1.1 km	MPC · JPL
487058	2014 OC_{80}	—	October 31, 2010	Mount Lemmon	Mount Lemmon Survey	·	2.0 km	MPC · JPL
487059	2014 OR_{85}	—	February 13, 2013	Haleakala	Pan-STARRS 1	·	1.4 km	MPC · JPL
487060	2014 OV_{87}	—	February 15, 2013	Haleakala	Pan-STARRS 1	·	960 m	MPC · JPL
487061	2014 OH_{89}	—	July 2, 2014	Haleakala	Pan-STARRS 1	·	2.1 km	MPC · JPL
487062	2014 OJ_{89}	—	June 22, 2014	Haleakala	Pan-STARRS 1	·	3.0 km	MPC · JPL
487063	2014 OJ_{90}	—	September 14, 2010	Mount Lemmon	Mount Lemmon Survey	·	2.2 km	MPC · JPL
487064	2014 OG_{92}	—	May 31, 2014	Haleakala	Pan-STARRS 1	MAR	840 m	MPC · JPL
487065	2014 OL_{93}	—	June 19, 2010	Mount Lemmon	Mount Lemmon Survey	·	1.2 km	MPC · JPL
487066	2014 OO_{93}	—	May 23, 2010	WISE	WISE	·	1.6 km	MPC · JPL
487067	2014 ON_{96}	—	July 26, 2014	Haleakala	Pan-STARRS 1	EUN	1.3 km	MPC · JPL
487068	2014 OF_{98}	—	July 28, 2009	Catalina	CSS	·	2.0 km	MPC · JPL
487069	2014 OK_{98}	—	February 2, 2008	Kitt Peak	Spacewatch	GEF	1.2 km	MPC · JPL
487070	2014 OV_{98}	—	January 10, 2006	Mount Lemmon	Mount Lemmon Survey	·	2.3 km	MPC · JPL
487071	2014 OM_{99}	—	February 22, 2007	Kitt Peak	Spacewatch	·	1.9 km	MPC · JPL
487072	2014 OP_{99}	—	January 16, 2009	Kitt Peak	Spacewatch	·	1.1 km	MPC · JPL
487073	2014 OL_{100}	—	July 7, 2014	Haleakala	Pan-STARRS 1	EOS	1.6 km	MPC · JPL
487074	2014 OV_{100}	—	February 12, 2011	Mount Lemmon	Mount Lemmon Survey	·	3.6 km	MPC · JPL
487075	2014 OE_{102}	—	April 25, 2007	Mount Lemmon	Mount Lemmon Survey	·	3.1 km	MPC · JPL
487076	2014 OX_{103}	—	July 26, 2014	Haleakala	Pan-STARRS 1	·	2.1 km	MPC · JPL
487077	2014 OQ_{105}	—	November 24, 2011	Haleakala	Pan-STARRS 1	BRA	1.6 km	MPC · JPL
487078	2014 OD_{106}	—	July 27, 2014	Haleakala	Pan-STARRS 1	·	1.7 km	MPC · JPL
487079	2014 OO_{109}	—	June 27, 2014	Haleakala	Pan-STARRS 1	·	3.4 km	MPC · JPL
487080	2014 OJ_{111}	—	April 9, 2010	Kitt Peak	Spacewatch	·	1.2 km	MPC · JPL
487081	2014 OK_{113}	—	July 25, 2014	Haleakala	Pan-STARRS 1	EOS	1.5 km	MPC · JPL
487082	2014 OZ_{117}	—	February 16, 2012	Haleakala	Pan-STARRS 1	·	2.9 km	MPC · JPL
487083	2014 OH_{119}	—	March 19, 2013	Haleakala	Pan-STARRS 1	·	1.2 km	MPC · JPL
487084	2014 OM_{119}	—	March 9, 2008	Mount Lemmon	Mount Lemmon Survey	·	1.6 km	MPC · JPL
487085	2014 OH_{120}	—	November 10, 2010	Mount Lemmon	Mount Lemmon Survey	·	1.5 km	MPC · JPL
487086	2014 OR_{120}	—	December 30, 2008	Kitt Peak	Spacewatch	3:2	3.5 km	MPC · JPL
487087	2014 OD_{121}	—	December 29, 2005	Kitt Peak	Spacewatch	·	2.7 km	MPC · JPL
487088	2014 OA_{123}	—	January 18, 2012	Kitt Peak	Spacewatch	·	2.6 km	MPC · JPL
487089	2014 OF_{124}	—	September 16, 2010	Kitt Peak	Spacewatch	·	1.6 km	MPC · JPL
487090	2014 OV_{125}	—	June 2, 2014	Mount Lemmon	Mount Lemmon Survey	·	1.0 km	MPC · JPL
487091	2014 OU_{126}	—	November 10, 2010	Mount Lemmon	Mount Lemmon Survey	KOR	1.1 km	MPC · JPL
487092	2014 OJ_{127}	—	April 19, 2013	Haleakala	Pan-STARRS 1	EOS	2.0 km	MPC · JPL
487093	2014 OC_{130}	—	December 31, 2011	Kitt Peak	Spacewatch	·	2.0 km	MPC · JPL
487094	2014 OO_{130}	—	June 27, 2010	WISE	WISE	·	3.0 km	MPC · JPL
487095	2014 OC_{133}	—	July 27, 2014	Haleakala	Pan-STARRS 1	·	2.2 km	MPC · JPL
487096	2014 OW_{137}	—	October 31, 2007	Mount Lemmon	Mount Lemmon Survey	·	1.3 km	MPC · JPL
487097	2014 OQ_{138}	—	January 10, 2013	Haleakala	Pan-STARRS 1	·	1.3 km	MPC · JPL
487098	2014 OE_{139}	—	February 1, 2006	Mount Lemmon	Mount Lemmon Survey	·	900 m	MPC · JPL
487099	2014 OM_{139}	—	March 12, 2013	Mount Lemmon	Mount Lemmon Survey	NEM	2.0 km	MPC · JPL
487100	2014 OO_{140}	—	June 1, 2005	Mount Lemmon	Mount Lemmon Survey	·	1.2 km	MPC · JPL

== 487101–487200 ==
back to top

Designation			Discovery			Properties		Ref
Permanent	Provisional	Named after	Date	Site	Discoverer(s)	Category	Diam.	Ref
487101	2014 OD_{141}	—	July 27, 2014	Haleakala	Pan-STARRS 1	EOS	1.5 km	MPC · JPL
487102	2014 OH_{146}	—	August 24, 2003	Cerro Tololo	Deep Ecliptic Survey	NYS	790 m	MPC · JPL
487103	2014 OC_{148}	—	January 31, 2006	Kitt Peak	Spacewatch	NYS	880 m	MPC · JPL
487104	2014 OO_{150}	—	October 2, 2005	Mount Lemmon	Mount Lemmon Survey	KOR	1.1 km	MPC · JPL
487105	2014 OH_{151}	—	April 10, 2013	Haleakala	Pan-STARRS 1	·	1.7 km	MPC · JPL
487106	2014 OR_{158}	—	October 26, 2011	Haleakala	Pan-STARRS 1	·	1.3 km	MPC · JPL
487107	2014 OS_{158}	—	September 22, 2009	Mount Lemmon	Mount Lemmon Survey	EOS	1.9 km	MPC · JPL
487108	2014 OZ_{158}	—	March 19, 2013	Haleakala	Pan-STARRS 1	·	1.5 km	MPC · JPL
487109	2014 OC_{159}	—	June 30, 2014	Haleakala	Pan-STARRS 1	·	2.3 km	MPC · JPL
487110	2014 OJ_{160}	—	April 13, 2013	Haleakala	Pan-STARRS 1	·	1.8 km	MPC · JPL
487111	2014 OT_{161}	—	June 26, 2014	Haleakala	Pan-STARRS 1	·	930 m	MPC · JPL
487112	2014 OY_{162}	—	September 10, 2010	Kitt Peak	Spacewatch	·	1.7 km	MPC · JPL
487113	2014 OW_{164}	—	June 27, 2014	Haleakala	Pan-STARRS 1	·	1.6 km	MPC · JPL
487114	2014 OH_{167}	—	August 16, 2009	Kitt Peak	Spacewatch	EOS	1.7 km	MPC · JPL
487115	2014 ON_{167}	—	October 31, 2010	Mount Lemmon	Mount Lemmon Survey	·	2.1 km	MPC · JPL
487116	2014 OE_{169}	—	June 29, 2014	Haleakala	Pan-STARRS 1	BRA	1.3 km	MPC · JPL
487117	2014 OQ_{169}	—	September 15, 2009	Kitt Peak	Spacewatch	(5651)	2.4 km	MPC · JPL
487118	2014 OA_{171}	—	February 6, 2008	Catalina	CSS	GEF	1.3 km	MPC · JPL
487119	2014 OP_{171}	—	April 2, 2006	Kitt Peak	Spacewatch	·	990 m	MPC · JPL
487120	2014 OS_{171}	—	June 27, 2014	Haleakala	Pan-STARRS 1	·	1.8 km	MPC · JPL
487121	2014 OB_{172}	—	July 3, 2014	Haleakala	Pan-STARRS 1	·	1.1 km	MPC · JPL
487122	2014 OU_{172}	—	June 27, 2014	Haleakala	Pan-STARRS 1	·	1.5 km	MPC · JPL
487123	2014 OZ_{172}	—	January 24, 2011	Mount Lemmon	Mount Lemmon Survey	·	2.5 km	MPC · JPL
487124	2014 OC_{173}	—	March 19, 2013	Haleakala	Pan-STARRS 1	NEM	2.0 km	MPC · JPL
487125	2014 OM_{173}	—	July 25, 2014	Haleakala	Pan-STARRS 1	·	840 m	MPC · JPL
487126	2014 ON_{174}	—	November 3, 2011	Mount Lemmon	Mount Lemmon Survey	·	1.3 km	MPC · JPL
487127	2014 OC_{176}	—	February 20, 2012	Haleakala	Pan-STARRS 1	·	2.6 km	MPC · JPL
487128	2014 OL_{179}	—	February 27, 2012	Haleakala	Pan-STARRS 1	·	1.9 km	MPC · JPL
487129	2014 OG_{182}	—	June 28, 2014	Haleakala	Pan-STARRS 1	·	2.4 km	MPC · JPL
487130	2014 OZ_{182}	—	January 2, 2011	Mount Lemmon	Mount Lemmon Survey	·	2.5 km	MPC · JPL
487131	2014 OZ_{185}	—	March 12, 2005	Kitt Peak	Spacewatch	·	1.1 km	MPC · JPL
487132	2014 OB_{186}	—	December 2, 2010	Kitt Peak	Spacewatch	·	2.6 km	MPC · JPL
487133	2014 OX_{190}	—	July 27, 2014	Haleakala	Pan-STARRS 1	·	1.1 km	MPC · JPL
487134	2014 OL_{195}	—	May 31, 2008	Mount Lemmon	Mount Lemmon Survey	·	3.0 km	MPC · JPL
487135	2014 OU_{201}	—	October 26, 2011	Haleakala	Pan-STARRS 1	·	830 m	MPC · JPL
487136	2014 OA_{202}	—	April 6, 2008	Mount Lemmon	Mount Lemmon Survey	AGN	1.1 km	MPC · JPL
487137	2014 OJ_{202}	—	January 26, 2006	Kitt Peak	Spacewatch	·	2.9 km	MPC · JPL
487138	2014 OY_{202}	—	April 10, 2013	Haleakala	Pan-STARRS 1	KOR	1.1 km	MPC · JPL
487139	2014 OS_{204}	—	September 26, 2005	Kitt Peak	Spacewatch	AGN	1.0 km	MPC · JPL
487140	2014 OS_{206}	—	July 7, 2014	Haleakala	Pan-STARRS 1	V	660 m	MPC · JPL
487141	2014 OX_{206}	—	December 5, 2007	Mount Lemmon	Mount Lemmon Survey	T_{j} (2.99) · 3:2 · SHU	4.5 km	MPC · JPL
487142	2014 OK_{208}	—	February 20, 2009	Kitt Peak	Spacewatch	·	1.1 km	MPC · JPL
487143	2014 OR_{209}	—	January 18, 2012	Mount Lemmon	Mount Lemmon Survey	·	1.6 km	MPC · JPL
487144	2014 OG_{214}	—	January 23, 2006	Kitt Peak	Spacewatch	·	3.2 km	MPC · JPL
487145	2014 OT_{215}	—	June 30, 2014	Haleakala	Pan-STARRS 1	·	2.6 km	MPC · JPL
487146	2014 OS_{217}	—	April 13, 2013	Haleakala	Pan-STARRS 1	·	2.7 km	MPC · JPL
487147	2014 OB_{218}	—	July 27, 2014	Haleakala	Pan-STARRS 1	·	3.6 km	MPC · JPL
487148	2014 OU_{218}	—	January 10, 2011	Kitt Peak	Spacewatch	·	2.6 km	MPC · JPL
487149	2014 ON_{219}	—	October 11, 2010	Kitt Peak	Spacewatch	AGN	1 km	MPC · JPL
487150	2014 OE_{221}	—	July 27, 2014	Haleakala	Pan-STARRS 1	·	3.2 km	MPC · JPL
487151	2014 OR_{221}	—	September 23, 2011	Haleakala	Pan-STARRS 1	·	1.2 km	MPC · JPL
487152	2014 OV_{221}	—	February 24, 2012	Kitt Peak	Spacewatch	EOS	1.8 km	MPC · JPL
487153	2014 OE_{222}	—	July 27, 2014	Haleakala	Pan-STARRS 1	VER	2.6 km	MPC · JPL
487154	2014 OP_{232}	—	February 13, 2010	WISE	WISE	URS	3.7 km	MPC · JPL
487155	2014 OR_{234}	—	October 30, 2009	Mount Lemmon	Mount Lemmon Survey	·	3.3 km	MPC · JPL
487156	2014 OP_{235}	—	April 5, 2014	Haleakala	Pan-STARRS 1	·	2.9 km	MPC · JPL
487157	2014 OL_{238}	—	July 29, 2014	Haleakala	Pan-STARRS 1	·	2.2 km	MPC · JPL
487158	2014 OP_{239}	—	July 25, 2014	Haleakala	Pan-STARRS 1	·	1.9 km	MPC · JPL
487159	2014 OJ_{246}	—	February 28, 2012	Haleakala	Pan-STARRS 1	·	2.6 km	MPC · JPL
487160	2014 OO_{246}	—	February 17, 2007	Kitt Peak	Spacewatch	EOS	1.9 km	MPC · JPL
487161	2014 OD_{251}	—	March 18, 2013	Kitt Peak	Spacewatch	·	1.8 km	MPC · JPL
487162	2014 OL_{252}	—	June 29, 2014	Haleakala	Pan-STARRS 1	·	1.9 km	MPC · JPL
487163	2014 OK_{253}	—	October 3, 1999	Kitt Peak	Spacewatch	·	2.1 km	MPC · JPL
487164	2014 OM_{254}	—	September 15, 2009	Kitt Peak	Spacewatch	·	1.9 km	MPC · JPL
487165	2014 OO_{257}	—	December 25, 2005	Kitt Peak	Spacewatch	TEL	1.2 km	MPC · JPL
487166	2014 ON_{258}	—	March 16, 2013	Kitt Peak	Spacewatch	·	1.7 km	MPC · JPL
487167	2014 OV_{258}	—	April 19, 2013	Haleakala	Pan-STARRS 1	·	3.2 km	MPC · JPL
487168	2014 OY_{262}	—	December 19, 2007	Mount Lemmon	Mount Lemmon Survey	·	2.2 km	MPC · JPL
487169	2014 OT_{268}	—	January 22, 2012	Haleakala	Pan-STARRS 1	·	3.1 km	MPC · JPL
487170	2014 OD_{274}	—	June 29, 2014	Haleakala	Pan-STARRS 1	·	1.9 km	MPC · JPL
487171	2014 ON_{276}	—	September 24, 2011	Haleakala	Pan-STARRS 1	·	1.6 km	MPC · JPL
487172	2014 OQ_{279}	—	April 22, 2007	Mount Lemmon	Mount Lemmon Survey	·	700 m	MPC · JPL
487173	2014 OB_{281}	—	December 14, 2010	Mount Lemmon	Mount Lemmon Survey	TEL	1.1 km	MPC · JPL
487174	2014 OF_{284}	—	August 27, 2009	Kitt Peak	Spacewatch	EOS	1.6 km	MPC · JPL
487175	2014 OU_{292}	—	February 24, 2012	Kitt Peak	Spacewatch	·	2.2 km	MPC · JPL
487176	2014 OC_{304}	—	February 9, 2008	Kitt Peak	Spacewatch	·	2.0 km	MPC · JPL
487177	2014 OR_{307}	—	April 1, 2008	Mount Lemmon	Mount Lemmon Survey	KOR	1.2 km	MPC · JPL
487178	2014 OV_{308}	—	April 10, 2013	Haleakala	Pan-STARRS 1	KOR	1.1 km	MPC · JPL
487179	2014 OR_{315}	—	October 26, 2011	Haleakala	Pan-STARRS 1	·	1.1 km	MPC · JPL
487180	2014 OQ_{316}	—	January 29, 2012	Kitt Peak	Spacewatch	·	3.5 km	MPC · JPL
487181	2014 OT_{319}	—	July 25, 2014	Haleakala	Pan-STARRS 1	·	3.4 km	MPC · JPL
487182	2014 OR_{327}	—	August 20, 2009	La Sagra	OAM	·	2.3 km	MPC · JPL
487183	2014 OH_{334}	—	April 16, 2013	Haleakala	Pan-STARRS 1	·	3.5 km	MPC · JPL
487184	2014 OK_{334}	—	July 30, 2014	Haleakala	Pan-STARRS 1	·	3.1 km	MPC · JPL
487185	2014 OS_{334}	—	June 27, 2014	Haleakala	Pan-STARRS 1	·	1.6 km	MPC · JPL
487186	2014 OX_{336}	—	June 7, 2013	Haleakala	Pan-STARRS 1	·	2.9 km	MPC · JPL
487187	2014 OO_{339}	—	February 4, 2012	Haleakala	Pan-STARRS 1	·	2.5 km	MPC · JPL
487188	2014 OB_{340}	—	December 19, 2007	Mount Lemmon	Mount Lemmon Survey	MAR	1 km	MPC · JPL
487189	2014 OC_{340}	—	June 27, 2014	Haleakala	Pan-STARRS 1	·	1.8 km	MPC · JPL
487190	2014 ON_{341}	—	February 17, 2005	La Silla	A. Boattini, H. Scholl	·	900 m	MPC · JPL
487191	2014 OH_{342}	—	September 16, 2009	Mount Lemmon	Mount Lemmon Survey	EOS	1.8 km	MPC · JPL
487192	2014 OQ_{342}	—	March 19, 2009	Kitt Peak	Spacewatch	·	1.2 km	MPC · JPL
487193	2014 OX_{345}	—	October 26, 2011	Haleakala	Pan-STARRS 1	·	1.2 km	MPC · JPL
487194	2014 OB_{349}	—	July 2, 2014	Haleakala	Pan-STARRS 1	·	1.6 km	MPC · JPL
487195	2014 OA_{356}	—	October 23, 2011	Haleakala	Pan-STARRS 1	·	1.5 km	MPC · JPL
487196	2014 OG_{356}	—	January 27, 2006	Kitt Peak	Spacewatch	·	2.2 km	MPC · JPL
487197	2014 OV_{356}	—	July 28, 2014	Haleakala	Pan-STARRS 1	EOS	1.6 km	MPC · JPL
487198	2014 OE_{358}	—	March 16, 2013	Kitt Peak	Spacewatch	·	1.6 km	MPC · JPL
487199	2014 OB_{360}	—	February 28, 2012	Haleakala	Pan-STARRS 1	·	3.0 km	MPC · JPL
487200	2014 OD_{360}	—	August 18, 2006	Kitt Peak	Spacewatch	·	1.4 km	MPC · JPL

== 487201–487300 ==
back to top

Designation			Discovery			Properties		Ref
Permanent	Provisional	Named after	Date	Site	Discoverer(s)	Category	Diam.	Ref
487201	2014 OW_{363}	—	December 29, 2005	Kitt Peak	Spacewatch	·	2.4 km	MPC · JPL
487202	2014 OL_{369}	—	April 17, 2013	Haleakala	Pan-STARRS 1	·	2.7 km	MPC · JPL
487203	2014 ON_{374}	—	June 27, 2014	Haleakala	Pan-STARRS 1	EOS	1.7 km	MPC · JPL
487204	2014 OY_{374}	—	July 25, 2014	Haleakala	Pan-STARRS 1	EOS	1.9 km	MPC · JPL
487205	2014 OK_{375}	—	July 25, 2014	Haleakala	Pan-STARRS 1	·	1.5 km	MPC · JPL
487206	2014 OM_{375}	—	January 25, 2006	Kitt Peak	Spacewatch	EOS	1.7 km	MPC · JPL
487207	2014 OT_{375}	—	February 25, 2012	Mount Lemmon	Mount Lemmon Survey	EOS	1.9 km	MPC · JPL
487208	2014 OZ_{375}	—	June 5, 2014	Haleakala	Pan-STARRS 1	·	1.3 km	MPC · JPL
487209	2014 OF_{377}	—	February 20, 2012	Haleakala	Pan-STARRS 1	EOS	1.9 km	MPC · JPL
487210	2014 OK_{377}	—	June 29, 2014	Haleakala	Pan-STARRS 1	VER	2.7 km	MPC · JPL
487211	2014 OL_{377}	—	August 31, 2005	Kitt Peak	Spacewatch	·	1.7 km	MPC · JPL
487212	2014 OK_{379}	—	April 30, 2009	Kitt Peak	Spacewatch	·	2.0 km	MPC · JPL
487213	2014 OV_{379}	—	February 17, 2013	Kitt Peak	Spacewatch	·	1.4 km	MPC · JPL
487214	2014 OZ_{380}	—	July 4, 2014	Haleakala	Pan-STARRS 1	·	2.4 km	MPC · JPL
487215	2014 OF_{383}	—	November 5, 2010	Mount Lemmon	Mount Lemmon Survey	·	3.5 km	MPC · JPL
487216	2014 OF_{386}	—	November 14, 2010	Mount Lemmon	Mount Lemmon Survey	EOS	1.8 km	MPC · JPL
487217	2014 OL_{386}	—	December 4, 2005	Kitt Peak	Spacewatch	·	2.9 km	MPC · JPL
487218	2014 ON_{386}	—	August 29, 2009	La Sagra	OAM	·	2.9 km	MPC · JPL
487219	2014 OD_{388}	—	October 20, 2006	Mount Lemmon	Mount Lemmon Survey	·	1.4 km	MPC · JPL
487220	2014 OJ_{388}	—	March 15, 2012	Mount Lemmon	Mount Lemmon Survey	·	2.6 km	MPC · JPL
487221	2014 OT_{388}	—	February 20, 2009	Mount Lemmon	Mount Lemmon Survey	·	950 m	MPC · JPL
487222	2014 OJ_{390}	—	January 20, 2010	WISE	WISE	·	2.7 km	MPC · JPL
487223	2014 OF_{391}	—	December 15, 2004	Kitt Peak	Spacewatch	·	3.4 km	MPC · JPL
487224	2014 OW_{391}	—	February 14, 2013	Haleakala	Pan-STARRS 1	·	2.1 km	MPC · JPL
487225	2014 PP	—	March 16, 2009	Kitt Peak	Spacewatch	·	1.3 km	MPC · JPL
487226	2014 PR_{1}	—	March 6, 2013	Haleakala	Pan-STARRS 1	·	1.2 km	MPC · JPL
487227	2014 PS_{2}	—	February 19, 2009	Kitt Peak	Spacewatch	·	1.1 km	MPC · JPL
487228	2014 PZ_{4}	—	July 3, 2014	Haleakala	Pan-STARRS 1	·	1.8 km	MPC · JPL
487229	2014 PL_{5}	—	January 27, 2012	Mount Lemmon	Mount Lemmon Survey	KOR	1.1 km	MPC · JPL
487230	2014 PE_{6}	—	June 2, 2014	Haleakala	Pan-STARRS 1	·	2.6 km	MPC · JPL
487231	2014 PZ_{7}	—	June 3, 2014	Haleakala	Pan-STARRS 1	EUN	1.0 km	MPC · JPL
487232	2014 PG_{8}	—	September 30, 2010	Mount Lemmon	Mount Lemmon Survey	·	1.6 km	MPC · JPL
487233	2014 PS_{8}	—	January 21, 2012	Haleakala	Pan-STARRS 1	·	3.9 km	MPC · JPL
487234	2014 PA_{10}	—	February 12, 2008	Kitt Peak	Spacewatch	·	1.7 km	MPC · JPL
487235	2014 PQ_{10}	—	February 16, 2012	Haleakala	Pan-STARRS 1	·	1.9 km	MPC · JPL
487236	2014 PC_{11}	—	February 13, 2010	WISE	WISE	SYL · CYB	3.3 km	MPC · JPL
487237	2014 PD_{11}	—	August 4, 2014	Haleakala	Pan-STARRS 1	EOS	2.1 km	MPC · JPL
487238	2014 PG_{12}	—	June 26, 2014	Haleakala	Pan-STARRS 1	BRA	1.5 km	MPC · JPL
487239	2014 PZ_{12}	—	January 28, 2011	Mount Lemmon	Mount Lemmon Survey	·	2.6 km	MPC · JPL
487240	2014 PM_{13}	—	March 26, 2006	Kitt Peak	Spacewatch	·	1.0 km	MPC · JPL
487241	2014 PU_{13}	—	June 3, 2014	Haleakala	Pan-STARRS 1	·	3.5 km	MPC · JPL
487242	2014 PX_{14}	—	February 2, 2006	Mount Lemmon	Mount Lemmon Survey	·	2.8 km	MPC · JPL
487243	2014 PB_{15}	—	February 27, 2012	Haleakala	Pan-STARRS 1	·	2.4 km	MPC · JPL
487244	2014 PF_{16}	—	January 27, 2012	Kitt Peak	Spacewatch	KOR	1.2 km	MPC · JPL
487245	2014 PJ_{16}	—	October 19, 2006	Kitt Peak	Spacewatch	·	1.2 km	MPC · JPL
487246	2014 PN_{16}	—	April 7, 2013	Kitt Peak	Spacewatch	EOS	1.5 km	MPC · JPL
487247	2014 PT_{16}	—	June 23, 2014	Mount Lemmon	Mount Lemmon Survey	·	3.1 km	MPC · JPL
487248	2014 PQ_{18}	—	November 16, 2010	Mount Lemmon	Mount Lemmon Survey	·	2.0 km	MPC · JPL
487249	2014 PA_{27}	—	March 16, 2012	Mount Lemmon	Mount Lemmon Survey	·	3.0 km	MPC · JPL
487250	2014 PU_{27}	—	July 25, 2014	Haleakala	Pan-STARRS 1	·	1.5 km	MPC · JPL
487251	2014 PW_{27}	—	October 17, 2010	Mount Lemmon	Mount Lemmon Survey	·	2.0 km	MPC · JPL
487252	2014 PY_{27}	—	February 1, 2012	Mount Lemmon	Mount Lemmon Survey	·	3.6 km	MPC · JPL
487253	2014 PN_{30}	—	May 15, 2013	Haleakala	Pan-STARRS 1	·	1.9 km	MPC · JPL
487254	2014 PT_{30}	—	August 17, 2009	Kitt Peak	Spacewatch	EOS	1.9 km	MPC · JPL
487255	2014 PL_{33}	—	October 27, 2009	Mount Lemmon	Mount Lemmon Survey	·	3.2 km	MPC · JPL
487256	2014 PN_{33}	—	March 26, 2008	Mount Lemmon	Mount Lemmon Survey	·	1.7 km	MPC · JPL
487257	2014 PX_{33}	—	December 22, 2005	Kitt Peak	Spacewatch	EMA	3.7 km	MPC · JPL
487258	2014 PJ_{34}	—	January 26, 2012	Haleakala	Pan-STARRS 1	·	2.3 km	MPC · JPL
487259	2014 PR_{34}	—	August 18, 2009	Kitt Peak	Spacewatch	·	1.9 km	MPC · JPL
487260	2014 PH_{35}	—	September 15, 2006	Kitt Peak	Spacewatch	EUN	1 km	MPC · JPL
487261	2014 PU_{35}	—	July 25, 2014	Haleakala	Pan-STARRS 1	·	2.3 km	MPC · JPL
487262	2014 PR_{37}	—	August 11, 2008	La Sagra	OAM	·	3.8 km	MPC · JPL
487263	2014 PS_{40}	—	September 27, 2009	Mount Lemmon	Mount Lemmon Survey	EOS	1.7 km	MPC · JPL
487264	2014 PV_{46}	—	January 22, 2006	Mount Lemmon	Mount Lemmon Survey	·	2.9 km	MPC · JPL
487265	2014 PO_{48}	—	January 23, 2006	Kitt Peak	Spacewatch	EOS	2.2 km	MPC · JPL
487266	2014 PZ_{51}	—	September 16, 2009	Mount Lemmon	Mount Lemmon Survey	EOS	1.5 km	MPC · JPL
487267	2014 PU_{53}	—	November 10, 2010	Mount Lemmon	Mount Lemmon Survey	·	3.3 km	MPC · JPL
487268	2014 PT_{54}	—	August 4, 2014	Haleakala	Pan-STARRS 1	·	2.3 km	MPC · JPL
487269	2014 PD_{57}	—	August 4, 2014	Haleakala	Pan-STARRS 1	·	2.7 km	MPC · JPL
487270	2014 PJ_{57}	—	May 26, 2007	Mount Lemmon	Mount Lemmon Survey	·	4.0 km	MPC · JPL
487271	2014 PM_{58}	—	February 16, 2012	Haleakala	Pan-STARRS 1	·	3.1 km	MPC · JPL
487272	2014 PV_{59}	—	December 15, 2009	Catalina	CSS	·	4.3 km	MPC · JPL
487273	2014 PH_{63}	—	June 19, 2010	Mount Lemmon	Mount Lemmon Survey	·	1.3 km	MPC · JPL
487274	2014 PR_{63}	—	July 3, 2014	Haleakala	Pan-STARRS 1	·	1.7 km	MPC · JPL
487275	2014 PN_{64}	—	June 5, 2014	Haleakala	Pan-STARRS 1	·	2.9 km	MPC · JPL
487276	2014 PJ_{66}	—	January 3, 2012	Mount Lemmon	Mount Lemmon Survey	·	2.3 km	MPC · JPL
487277	2014 PN_{68}	—	February 17, 2004	Kitt Peak	Spacewatch	·	1.3 km	MPC · JPL
487278	2014 PD_{69}	—	February 3, 2012	Haleakala	Pan-STARRS 1	·	2.0 km	MPC · JPL
487279	2014 PK_{69}	—	July 28, 2014	Haleakala	Pan-STARRS 1	EOS	1.6 km	MPC · JPL
487280	2014 QK	—	September 11, 2001	Socorro	LINEAR	·	2.4 km	MPC · JPL
487281	2014 QN_{1}	—	February 28, 2008	Kitt Peak	Spacewatch	·	2.0 km	MPC · JPL
487282	2014 QQ_{10}	—	June 3, 2014	Haleakala	Pan-STARRS 1	·	1.4 km	MPC · JPL
487283	2014 QL_{21}	—	March 15, 2012	Mount Lemmon	Mount Lemmon Survey	·	2.1 km	MPC · JPL
487284	2014 QV_{23}	—	January 15, 2010	WISE	WISE	·	4.2 km	MPC · JPL
487285	2014 QC_{25}	—	July 26, 1995	Kitt Peak	Spacewatch	CYB	3.3 km	MPC · JPL
487286	2014 QL_{25}	—	January 28, 2011	Mount Lemmon	Mount Lemmon Survey	CYB	2.9 km	MPC · JPL
487287	2014 QR_{26}	—	September 15, 2006	Kitt Peak	Spacewatch	·	850 m	MPC · JPL
487288	2014 QD_{34}	—	May 18, 2002	Palomar	NEAT	NYS	1.2 km	MPC · JPL
487289	2014 QZ_{34}	—	July 2, 2014	Haleakala	Pan-STARRS 1	·	2.5 km	MPC · JPL
487290	2014 QZ_{37}	—	March 13, 2007	Mount Lemmon	Mount Lemmon Survey	·	2.3 km	MPC · JPL
487291	2014 QO_{38}	—	November 5, 2010	Mount Lemmon	Mount Lemmon Survey	·	2.5 km	MPC · JPL
487292	2014 QU_{38}	—	January 20, 2012	Haleakala	Pan-STARRS 1	·	3.6 km	MPC · JPL
487293	2014 QR_{40}	—	October 11, 2010	Mount Lemmon	Mount Lemmon Survey	·	1.9 km	MPC · JPL
487294	2014 QV_{41}	—	April 16, 2013	Haleakala	Pan-STARRS 1	EOS	1.7 km	MPC · JPL
487295	2014 QU_{42}	—	February 12, 2004	Kitt Peak	Spacewatch	JUN	990 m	MPC · JPL
487296	2014 QM_{43}	—	July 2, 2014	Haleakala	Pan-STARRS 1	·	3.5 km	MPC · JPL
487297	2014 QE_{53}	—	February 1, 2013	Mount Lemmon	Mount Lemmon Survey	·	1.1 km	MPC · JPL
487298	2014 QL_{56}	—	October 1, 2003	Kitt Peak	Spacewatch	·	1.2 km	MPC · JPL
487299	2014 QX_{58}	—	April 16, 2013	Haleakala	Pan-STARRS 1	·	1.9 km	MPC · JPL
487300	2014 QP_{61}	—	January 19, 2012	Kitt Peak	Spacewatch	·	2.6 km	MPC · JPL

== 487301–487400 ==
back to top

Designation			Discovery			Properties		Ref
Permanent	Provisional	Named after	Date	Site	Discoverer(s)	Category	Diam.	Ref
487301	2014 QZ_{61}	—	June 27, 2014	Haleakala	Pan-STARRS 1	BRA	1.5 km	MPC · JPL
487302	2014 QN_{66}	—	June 27, 2014	Haleakala	Pan-STARRS 1	·	1.1 km	MPC · JPL
487303	2014 QQ_{71}	—	August 27, 2009	Kitt Peak	Spacewatch	·	1.7 km	MPC · JPL
487304	2014 QX_{73}	—	December 5, 2010	Kitt Peak	Spacewatch	·	3.1 km	MPC · JPL
487305	2014 QY_{75}	—	August 20, 2014	Haleakala	Pan-STARRS 1	·	1.9 km	MPC · JPL
487306	2014 QR_{87}	—	June 3, 2014	Haleakala	Pan-STARRS 1	·	2.5 km	MPC · JPL
487307	2014 QZ_{88}	—	June 3, 2014	Haleakala	Pan-STARRS 1	·	2.4 km	MPC · JPL
487308	2014 QW_{106}	—	March 16, 2012	Haleakala	Pan-STARRS 1	·	2.4 km	MPC · JPL
487309	2014 QX_{108}	—	June 3, 2014	Haleakala	Pan-STARRS 1	GEF	1.1 km	MPC · JPL
487310	2014 QZ_{112}	—	October 9, 2010	Mount Lemmon	Mount Lemmon Survey	·	1.4 km	MPC · JPL
487311	2014 QF_{113}	—	October 14, 2004	Kitt Peak	Spacewatch	·	2.3 km	MPC · JPL
487312	2014 QM_{114}	—	May 15, 2013	Haleakala	Pan-STARRS 1	EOS	1.5 km	MPC · JPL
487313	2014 QQ_{115}	—	April 25, 2011	Haleakala	Pan-STARRS 1	·	3.7 km	MPC · JPL
487314	2014 QA_{116}	—	February 27, 2012	Haleakala	Pan-STARRS 1	EOS	2.0 km	MPC · JPL
487315	2014 QB_{119}	—	July 28, 2014	Haleakala	Pan-STARRS 1	·	1.7 km	MPC · JPL
487316	2014 QW_{121}	—	October 28, 2005	Mount Lemmon	Mount Lemmon Survey	KOR	1.2 km	MPC · JPL
487317	2014 QT_{126}	—	February 1, 2012	Mount Lemmon	Mount Lemmon Survey	·	1.9 km	MPC · JPL
487318	2014 QP_{129}	—	February 28, 2012	Haleakala	Pan-STARRS 1	·	2.2 km	MPC · JPL
487319	2014 QT_{129}	—	March 13, 2012	Mount Lemmon	Mount Lemmon Survey	EOS	1.7 km	MPC · JPL
487320	2014 QQ_{133}	—	February 21, 2012	Kitt Peak	Spacewatch	EOS	1.9 km	MPC · JPL
487321	2014 QR_{134}	—	September 14, 2009	Kitt Peak	Spacewatch	·	1.5 km	MPC · JPL
487322	2014 QY_{134}	—	October 6, 2005	Kitt Peak	Spacewatch	·	1.6 km	MPC · JPL
487323	2014 QQ_{144}	—	November 5, 2010	Mount Lemmon	Mount Lemmon Survey	·	2.2 km	MPC · JPL
487324	2014 QV_{145}	—	January 26, 2006	Mount Lemmon	Mount Lemmon Survey	·	2.5 km	MPC · JPL
487325	2014 QO_{152}	—	June 24, 2014	Haleakala	Pan-STARRS 1	526	2.9 km	MPC · JPL
487326	2014 QG_{153}	—	May 8, 2013	Haleakala	Pan-STARRS 1	·	2.5 km	MPC · JPL
487327	2014 QL_{153}	—	February 24, 2006	Kitt Peak	Spacewatch	·	2.9 km	MPC · JPL
487328	2014 QV_{171}	—	September 10, 2004	Kitt Peak	Spacewatch	EOS	1.4 km	MPC · JPL
487329	2014 QA_{172}	—	February 10, 2007	Mount Lemmon	Mount Lemmon Survey	·	1.8 km	MPC · JPL
487330	2014 QV_{172}	—	October 30, 2010	Kitt Peak	Spacewatch	·	1.8 km	MPC · JPL
487331	2014 QC_{174}	—	September 23, 2008	Mount Lemmon	Mount Lemmon Survey	CYB	3.2 km	MPC · JPL
487332	2014 QU_{174}	—	February 24, 2006	Kitt Peak	Spacewatch	·	2.4 km	MPC · JPL
487333	2014 QM_{175}	—	August 30, 2009	Kitt Peak	Spacewatch	·	2.4 km	MPC · JPL
487334	2014 QL_{176}	—	February 26, 2012	Haleakala	Pan-STARRS 1	EOS	1.8 km	MPC · JPL
487335	2014 QS_{176}	—	March 16, 2013	Kitt Peak	Spacewatch	EUN	1.2 km	MPC · JPL
487336	2014 QY_{190}	—	April 19, 2013	Haleakala	Pan-STARRS 1	·	2.5 km	MPC · JPL
487337	2014 QA_{192}	—	January 8, 2006	Mount Lemmon	Mount Lemmon Survey	·	3.4 km	MPC · JPL
487338	2014 QK_{193}	—	December 29, 2011	Mount Lemmon	Mount Lemmon Survey	BRA	1.5 km	MPC · JPL
487339	2014 QS_{194}	—	January 3, 2011	Mount Lemmon	Mount Lemmon Survey	·	3.0 km	MPC · JPL
487340	2014 QF_{197}	—	May 27, 2009	Mount Lemmon	Mount Lemmon Survey	·	1.3 km	MPC · JPL
487341	2014 QN_{199}	—	June 24, 2014	Haleakala	Pan-STARRS 1	·	2.8 km	MPC · JPL
487342	2014 QF_{200}	—	January 26, 2006	Mount Lemmon	Mount Lemmon Survey	EOS	1.9 km	MPC · JPL
487343	2014 QA_{201}	—	January 14, 2012	Catalina	CSS	BRA	1.8 km	MPC · JPL
487344	2014 QA_{202}	—	August 22, 2014	Haleakala	Pan-STARRS 1	·	2.2 km	MPC · JPL
487345	2014 QY_{203}	—	September 15, 2010	Mount Lemmon	Mount Lemmon Survey	EUN	1.1 km	MPC · JPL
487346	2014 QE_{205}	—	June 24, 2014	Haleakala	Pan-STARRS 1	·	2.7 km	MPC · JPL
487347	2014 QE_{206}	—	February 23, 2012	Mount Lemmon	Mount Lemmon Survey	·	2.9 km	MPC · JPL
487348	2014 QT_{207}	—	February 13, 2012	Haleakala	Pan-STARRS 1	·	2.4 km	MPC · JPL
487349	2014 QV_{207}	—	September 19, 2003	Kitt Peak	Spacewatch	·	2.6 km	MPC · JPL
487350	2014 QB_{213}	—	October 29, 2010	Mount Lemmon	Mount Lemmon Survey	·	1.5 km	MPC · JPL
487351	2014 QV_{214}	—	February 27, 2012	Haleakala	Pan-STARRS 1	EOS	1.5 km	MPC · JPL
487352	2014 QB_{215}	—	April 10, 2013	Haleakala	Pan-STARRS 1	·	1.8 km	MPC · JPL
487353	2014 QF_{217}	—	December 28, 2000	Kitt Peak	Spacewatch	·	2.7 km	MPC · JPL
487354	2014 QE_{218}	—	January 19, 2012	Haleakala	Pan-STARRS 1	·	2.8 km	MPC · JPL
487355	2014 QO_{220}	—	January 6, 2006	Kitt Peak	Spacewatch	·	2.0 km	MPC · JPL
487356	2014 QS_{226}	—	February 27, 2012	Haleakala	Pan-STARRS 1	EOS	2.1 km	MPC · JPL
487357	2014 QJ_{227}	—	September 10, 2010	Kitt Peak	Spacewatch	·	1.3 km	MPC · JPL
487358	2014 QW_{227}	—	January 15, 2010	WISE	WISE	·	4.7 km	MPC · JPL
487359	2014 QT_{237}	—	January 29, 2010	WISE	WISE	·	3.0 km	MPC · JPL
487360	2014 QY_{241}	—	October 23, 2003	Kitt Peak	Spacewatch	·	3.7 km	MPC · JPL
487361	2014 QH_{242}	—	July 7, 2014	Haleakala	Pan-STARRS 1	·	2.7 km	MPC · JPL
487362	2014 QJ_{242}	—	February 28, 2012	Haleakala	Pan-STARRS 1	VER	2.3 km	MPC · JPL
487363	2014 QB_{244}	—	February 12, 2011	Mount Lemmon	Mount Lemmon Survey	·	2.6 km	MPC · JPL
487364	2014 QU_{247}	—	October 1, 2005	Kitt Peak	Spacewatch	·	1.7 km	MPC · JPL
487365	2014 QB_{248}	—	July 31, 2014	Haleakala	Pan-STARRS 1	·	1.7 km	MPC · JPL
487366	2014 QR_{251}	—	January 15, 2009	Kitt Peak	Spacewatch	·	2.0 km	MPC · JPL
487367	2014 QU_{251}	—	December 8, 2010	Mount Lemmon	Mount Lemmon Survey	·	3.4 km	MPC · JPL
487368	2014 QA_{252}	—	October 27, 2009	Mount Lemmon	Mount Lemmon Survey	·	3.0 km	MPC · JPL
487369	2014 QQ_{255}	—	November 30, 2005	Kitt Peak	Spacewatch	·	2.4 km	MPC · JPL
487370	2014 QV_{255}	—	March 11, 2008	Mount Lemmon	Mount Lemmon Survey	·	1.8 km	MPC · JPL
487371	2014 QG_{256}	—	September 22, 2009	Mount Lemmon	Mount Lemmon Survey	·	3.0 km	MPC · JPL
487372	2014 QP_{256}	—	December 17, 1999	Kitt Peak	Spacewatch	EOS	1.7 km	MPC · JPL
487373	2014 QX_{257}	—	April 21, 2013	Catalina	CSS	·	1.3 km	MPC · JPL
487374	2014 QE_{265}	—	August 22, 2014	Haleakala	Pan-STARRS 1	EOS	1.6 km	MPC · JPL
487375	2014 QV_{265}	—	January 30, 2006	Kitt Peak	Spacewatch	·	2.8 km	MPC · JPL
487376	2014 QF_{272}	—	February 15, 2012	Haleakala	Pan-STARRS 1	EOS	2.2 km	MPC · JPL
487377	2014 QQ_{273}	—	February 27, 2007	Kitt Peak	Spacewatch	·	1.9 km	MPC · JPL
487378	2014 QR_{276}	—	September 30, 2009	Mount Lemmon	Mount Lemmon Survey	·	2.7 km	MPC · JPL
487379	2014 QK_{277}	—	July 28, 2014	Haleakala	Pan-STARRS 1	·	1.6 km	MPC · JPL
487380	2014 QF_{282}	—	May 15, 2013	Haleakala	Pan-STARRS 1	·	3.0 km	MPC · JPL
487381	2014 QE_{283}	—	March 2, 2009	Mount Lemmon	Mount Lemmon Survey	·	1.7 km	MPC · JPL
487382	2014 QS_{283}	—	August 25, 2014	Haleakala	Pan-STARRS 1	·	1.5 km	MPC · JPL
487383	2014 QG_{288}	—	March 16, 2013	Catalina	CSS	·	2.5 km	MPC · JPL
487384	2014 QZ_{288}	—	January 7, 1994	Kitt Peak	Spacewatch	·	3.0 km	MPC · JPL
487385	2014 QU_{298}	—	September 15, 2009	Kitt Peak	Spacewatch	·	2.1 km	MPC · JPL
487386	2014 QA_{301}	—	October 10, 2008	Kitt Peak	Spacewatch	CYB	3.3 km	MPC · JPL
487387	2014 QP_{302}	—	March 13, 2012	Mount Lemmon	Mount Lemmon Survey	·	2.8 km	MPC · JPL
487388	2014 QO_{304}	—	March 25, 2012	Mount Lemmon	Mount Lemmon Survey	·	2.5 km	MPC · JPL
487389	2014 QD_{305}	—	January 13, 2011	Mount Lemmon	Mount Lemmon Survey	·	2.5 km	MPC · JPL
487390	2014 QX_{307}	—	December 14, 2010	Mount Lemmon	Mount Lemmon Survey	·	1.9 km	MPC · JPL
487391	2014 QF_{311}	—	September 30, 2005	Mount Lemmon	Mount Lemmon Survey	615	1.3 km	MPC · JPL
487392	2014 QA_{312}	—	October 26, 2011	Haleakala	Pan-STARRS 1	·	1.1 km	MPC · JPL
487393	2014 QO_{315}	—	July 4, 2014	Haleakala	Pan-STARRS 1	·	1.7 km	MPC · JPL
487394	2014 QA_{316}	—	January 21, 2012	Haleakala	Pan-STARRS 1	EOS	1.8 km	MPC · JPL
487395	2014 QG_{322}	—	January 16, 2005	Mauna Kea	Veillet, C.	MAS	750 m	MPC · JPL
487396	2014 QO_{326}	—	March 15, 2007	Mount Lemmon	Mount Lemmon Survey	EOS	1.8 km	MPC · JPL
487397	2014 QA_{327}	—	August 3, 2008	Siding Spring	SSS	·	3.9 km	MPC · JPL
487398	2014 QM_{329}	—	March 29, 2012	Haleakala	Pan-STARRS 1	·	2.5 km	MPC · JPL
487399	2014 QY_{334}	—	December 18, 2004	Mount Lemmon	Mount Lemmon Survey	·	3.0 km	MPC · JPL
487400	2014 QR_{338}	—	September 16, 2009	Mount Lemmon	Mount Lemmon Survey	·	2.6 km	MPC · JPL

== 487401–487500 ==
back to top

Designation			Discovery			Properties		Ref
Permanent	Provisional	Named after	Date	Site	Discoverer(s)	Category	Diam.	Ref
487401	2014 QN_{339}	—	January 4, 2011	Mount Lemmon	Mount Lemmon Survey	·	3.0 km	MPC · JPL
487402	2014 QA_{342}	—	January 27, 2012	Mount Lemmon	Mount Lemmon Survey	·	3.2 km	MPC · JPL
487403	2014 QB_{344}	—	September 19, 2009	Kitt Peak	Spacewatch	EOS	1.9 km	MPC · JPL
487404	2014 QM_{346}	—	August 15, 2014	Haleakala	Pan-STARRS 1	·	3.5 km	MPC · JPL
487405	2014 QT_{360}	—	February 27, 2012	Haleakala	Pan-STARRS 1	VER	2.5 km	MPC · JPL
487406	2014 QU_{360}	—	October 3, 2003	Kitt Peak	Spacewatch	·	3.3 km	MPC · JPL
487407	2014 QQ_{365}	—	April 19, 2013	Haleakala	Pan-STARRS 1	·	2.1 km	MPC · JPL
487408	2014 QW_{367}	—	September 1, 2008	La Sagra	OAM	·	3.6 km	MPC · JPL
487409	2014 QL_{370}	—	April 14, 2012	Haleakala	Pan-STARRS 1	·	2.5 km	MPC · JPL
487410	2014 QR_{372}	—	November 3, 2010	Mount Lemmon	Mount Lemmon Survey	NEM	2.2 km	MPC · JPL
487411	2014 QS_{374}	—	August 31, 2005	Kitt Peak	Spacewatch	·	1.7 km	MPC · JPL
487412	2014 QZ_{375}	—	November 12, 2010	Mount Lemmon	Mount Lemmon Survey	·	2.0 km	MPC · JPL
487413	2014 QR_{376}	—	September 26, 2008	Mount Lemmon	Mount Lemmon Survey	·	3.6 km	MPC · JPL
487414	2014 QA_{378}	—	February 25, 2012	Kitt Peak	Spacewatch	·	1.9 km	MPC · JPL
487415	2014 QG_{383}	—	August 28, 2014	Haleakala	Pan-STARRS 1	EOS	1.9 km	MPC · JPL
487416	2014 QH_{384}	—	January 6, 2006	Socorro	LINEAR	·	4.4 km	MPC · JPL
487417	2014 QW_{384}	—	March 9, 2007	Mount Lemmon	Mount Lemmon Survey	·	1.6 km	MPC · JPL
487418	2014 QV_{394}	—	September 19, 2006	Kitt Peak	Spacewatch	·	1.4 km	MPC · JPL
487419	2014 QT_{403}	—	October 23, 2005	Catalina	CSS	·	2.3 km	MPC · JPL
487420	2014 QD_{407}	—	September 18, 2003	Kitt Peak	Spacewatch	·	2.9 km	MPC · JPL
487421	2014 QU_{412}	—	February 28, 2008	Kitt Peak	Spacewatch	HOF	2.8 km	MPC · JPL
487422	2014 QW_{413}	—	January 16, 2011	Mount Lemmon	Mount Lemmon Survey	·	2.6 km	MPC · JPL
487423	2014 QZ_{417}	—	September 30, 2003	Kitt Peak	Spacewatch	·	3.4 km	MPC · JPL
487424	2014 QS_{422}	—	October 23, 2009	Kitt Peak	Spacewatch	·	2.5 km	MPC · JPL
487425	2014 QK_{423}	—	August 29, 2006	Kitt Peak	Spacewatch	·	1.1 km	MPC · JPL
487426	2014 QV_{423}	—	September 19, 2003	Kitt Peak	Spacewatch	·	3.1 km	MPC · JPL
487427	2014 QF_{426}	—	January 15, 2005	Kitt Peak	Spacewatch	·	3.8 km	MPC · JPL
487428	2014 QR_{427}	—	January 19, 2012	Haleakala	Pan-STARRS 1	·	2.9 km	MPC · JPL
487429	2014 QF_{429}	—	March 15, 2012	Mount Lemmon	Mount Lemmon Survey	·	2.5 km	MPC · JPL
487430	2014 QS_{431}	—	July 28, 2014	Haleakala	Pan-STARRS 1	·	2.5 km	MPC · JPL
487431	2014 RR_{3}	—	June 4, 2013	Mount Lemmon	Mount Lemmon Survey	·	1.9 km	MPC · JPL
487432	2014 RU_{8}	—	July 30, 2014	Kitt Peak	Spacewatch	·	2.4 km	MPC · JPL
487433	2014 RE_{15}	—	January 2, 2006	Mount Lemmon	Mount Lemmon Survey	EOS	2.1 km	MPC · JPL
487434	2014 RK_{21}	—	October 30, 2007	Mount Lemmon	Mount Lemmon Survey	MAS	700 m	MPC · JPL
487435	2014 RD_{27}	—	May 17, 2004	Socorro	LINEAR	·	2.3 km	MPC · JPL
487436	2014 RW_{29}	—	September 27, 2003	Socorro	LINEAR	·	3.0 km	MPC · JPL
487437	2014 RW_{33}	—	July 28, 2014	Haleakala	Pan-STARRS 1	·	2.8 km	MPC · JPL
487438	2014 RO_{35}	—	November 28, 1994	Kitt Peak	Spacewatch	EOS	2.0 km	MPC · JPL
487439	2014 RH_{36}	—	January 23, 1998	Kitt Peak	Spacewatch	·	2.3 km	MPC · JPL
487440	2014 RU_{36}	—	March 12, 2007	Kitt Peak	Spacewatch	·	1.8 km	MPC · JPL
487441	2014 RM_{37}	—	July 27, 2014	Haleakala	Pan-STARRS 1	·	2.8 km	MPC · JPL
487442	2014 RT_{50}	—	June 19, 2013	Haleakala	Pan-STARRS 1	·	2.2 km	MPC · JPL
487443	2014 RM_{61}	—	May 8, 2008	Vail	Observatory, Jarnac	·	2.9 km	MPC · JPL
487444	2014 RE_{62}	—	December 6, 2011	Haleakala	Pan-STARRS 1	EOS	2.3 km	MPC · JPL
487445	2014 RG_{62}	—	October 1, 2009	Mount Lemmon	Mount Lemmon Survey	·	4.0 km	MPC · JPL
487446	2014 RU_{62}	—	August 1, 2008	Charleston	R. Holmes	·	3.7 km	MPC · JPL
487447	2014 RR_{63}	—	January 13, 2016	Haleakala	Pan-STARRS 1	L5	10 km	MPC · JPL
487448	2014 SF_{2}	—	September 21, 2009	Catalina	CSS	·	3.4 km	MPC · JPL
487449	2014 SL_{18}	—	January 13, 2008	Kitt Peak	Spacewatch	·	1.3 km	MPC · JPL
487450	2014 SQ_{24}	—	August 20, 2014	Haleakala	Pan-STARRS 1	·	2.2 km	MPC · JPL
487451	2014 SJ_{25}	—	November 18, 2003	Kitt Peak	Spacewatch	·	2.8 km	MPC · JPL
487452	2014 SD_{31}	—	October 1, 2003	Kitt Peak	Spacewatch	VER	2.4 km	MPC · JPL
487453	2014 SL_{45}	—	February 13, 2012	Kitt Peak	Spacewatch	EOS	1.6 km	MPC · JPL
487454	2014 SM_{58}	—	October 9, 2004	Socorro	LINEAR	·	1.6 km	MPC · JPL
487455	2014 SH_{74}	—	January 27, 2007	Kitt Peak	Spacewatch	·	1.8 km	MPC · JPL
487456	2014 SD_{83}	—	October 9, 2005	Kitt Peak	Spacewatch	AGN	1.0 km	MPC · JPL
487457	2014 SN_{89}	—	March 3, 2006	Kitt Peak	Spacewatch	·	2.5 km	MPC · JPL
487458	2014 SP_{90}	—	January 15, 2011	Mount Lemmon	Mount Lemmon Survey	·	3.0 km	MPC · JPL
487459	2014 SR_{100}	—	March 2, 2006	Kitt Peak	Spacewatch	·	2.4 km	MPC · JPL
487460	2014 SE_{115}	—	February 23, 2012	Kitt Peak	Spacewatch	·	1.8 km	MPC · JPL
487461	2014 SY_{115}	—	February 27, 2006	Kitt Peak	Spacewatch	·	3.1 km	MPC · JPL
487462	2014 SJ_{117}	—	August 4, 2008	Siding Spring	SSS	·	3.7 km	MPC · JPL
487463	2014 ST_{122}	—	August 16, 2009	Kitt Peak	Spacewatch	KOR	1.6 km	MPC · JPL
487464	2014 SK_{133}	—	March 9, 2007	Kitt Peak	Spacewatch	EOS	1.4 km	MPC · JPL
487465	2014 SY_{133}	—	October 25, 2003	Kitt Peak	Spacewatch	·	4.1 km	MPC · JPL
487466	2014 SJ_{138}	—	February 23, 2007	Kitt Peak	Spacewatch	·	2.0 km	MPC · JPL
487467	2014 SR_{146}	—	February 28, 2010	WISE	WISE	·	2.9 km	MPC · JPL
487468	2014 SA_{151}	—	September 19, 2014	Haleakala	Pan-STARRS 1	EOS	2.0 km	MPC · JPL
487469	2014 SA_{152}	—	January 10, 2008	Mount Lemmon	Mount Lemmon Survey	·	1.6 km	MPC · JPL
487470	2014 SE_{152}	—	March 18, 2007	Kitt Peak	Spacewatch	·	4.0 km	MPC · JPL
487471	2014 SC_{154}	—	May 15, 2013	Haleakala	Pan-STARRS 1	·	3.1 km	MPC · JPL
487472	2014 SE_{154}	—	July 25, 2010	WISE	WISE	·	1.4 km	MPC · JPL
487473	2014 SL_{166}	—	February 27, 2006	Mount Lemmon	Mount Lemmon Survey	·	2.5 km	MPC · JPL
487474	2014 SG_{172}	—	February 16, 2012	Haleakala	Pan-STARRS 1	·	2.0 km	MPC · JPL
487475	2014 SE_{173}	—	October 23, 2005	Catalina	CSS	·	1.9 km	MPC · JPL
487476	2014 SG_{179}	—	August 27, 2014	Haleakala	Pan-STARRS 1	THM	1.9 km	MPC · JPL
487477	2014 SO_{196}	—	October 17, 2007	Mount Lemmon	Mount Lemmon Survey	·	1.3 km	MPC · JPL
487478	2014 SW_{201}	—	January 8, 2006	Kitt Peak	Spacewatch	·	2.5 km	MPC · JPL
487479	2014 SB_{216}	—	June 7, 2007	Kitt Peak	Spacewatch	·	3.1 km	MPC · JPL
487480	2014 SY_{217}	—	May 22, 2012	Mount Lemmon	Mount Lemmon Survey	·	3.5 km	MPC · JPL
487481	2014 SP_{218}	—	March 4, 2005	Kitt Peak	Spacewatch	·	3.0 km	MPC · JPL
487482	2014 SS_{218}	—	March 9, 2005	Mount Lemmon	Mount Lemmon Survey	·	3.4 km	MPC · JPL
487483	2014 SK_{220}	—	September 20, 2014	Haleakala	Pan-STARRS 1	·	3.0 km	MPC · JPL
487484	2014 SF_{235}	—	October 2, 2003	Kitt Peak	Spacewatch	·	3.0 km	MPC · JPL
487485	2014 SA_{244}	—	March 25, 2007	Mount Lemmon	Mount Lemmon Survey	·	3.2 km	MPC · JPL
487486	2014 SM_{258}	—	October 24, 2005	Kitt Peak	Spacewatch	HOF	3.2 km	MPC · JPL
487487	2014 SK_{263}	—	April 24, 2007	Mount Lemmon	Mount Lemmon Survey	·	4.6 km	MPC · JPL
487488	2014 SY_{264}	—	September 19, 2003	Kitt Peak	Spacewatch	·	3.0 km	MPC · JPL
487489	2014 SE_{265}	—	November 10, 2010	Mount Lemmon	Mount Lemmon Survey	·	1.5 km	MPC · JPL
487490	2014 SV_{265}	—	October 10, 2004	Socorro	LINEAR	·	2.9 km	MPC · JPL
487491	2014 ST_{272}	—	August 23, 2004	Kitt Peak	Spacewatch	·	2.3 km	MPC · JPL
487492	2014 SY_{278}	—	February 19, 2012	Kitt Peak	Spacewatch	EOS	2.0 km	MPC · JPL
487493	2014 SQ_{281}	—	October 1, 2005	Kitt Peak	Spacewatch	(21344)	2.2 km	MPC · JPL
487494	2014 SU_{283}	—	September 30, 2009	Mount Lemmon	Mount Lemmon Survey	EOS	2.6 km	MPC · JPL
487495	2014 SH_{285}	—	August 10, 2008	La Sagra	OAM	·	3.3 km	MPC · JPL
487496	2014 SE_{288}	—	September 19, 2014	Haleakala	Pan-STARRS 1	T_{j} (2.84)	5.2 km	MPC · JPL
487497	2014 SR_{288}	—	February 5, 2011	Haleakala	Pan-STARRS 1	T_{j} (2.98)	3.1 km	MPC · JPL
487498	2014 SP_{295}	—	October 29, 2005	Mount Lemmon	Mount Lemmon Survey	·	2.9 km	MPC · JPL
487499	2014 SQ_{295}	—	August 28, 2014	Haleakala	Pan-STARRS 1	·	2.6 km	MPC · JPL
487500	2014 SQ_{300}	—	March 14, 2012	Kitt Peak	Spacewatch	·	3.0 km	MPC · JPL

== 487501–487600 ==
back to top

Designation			Discovery			Properties		Ref
Permanent	Provisional	Named after	Date	Site	Discoverer(s)	Category	Diam.	Ref
487501	2014 SM_{313}	—	September 21, 2009	Mount Lemmon	Mount Lemmon Survey	EOS	2.3 km	MPC · JPL
487502	2014 SE_{315}	—	August 18, 2009	Kitt Peak	Spacewatch	AGN	1.2 km	MPC · JPL
487503	2014 SS_{331}	—	September 22, 2009	Mount Lemmon	Mount Lemmon Survey	·	3.1 km	MPC · JPL
487504	2014 SU_{331}	—	October 21, 2006	Kitt Peak	Spacewatch	·	1.2 km	MPC · JPL
487505	2014 SK_{340}	—	June 10, 1997	Kitt Peak	Spacewatch	·	2.5 km	MPC · JPL
487506	2014 SL_{349}	—	December 9, 2015	Mount Lemmon	Mount Lemmon Survey	L5 · (17492)	8.0 km	MPC · JPL
487507	2014 TM_{8}	—	November 17, 2004	Campo Imperatore	CINEOS	·	2.7 km	MPC · JPL
487508	2014 TD_{13}	—	November 17, 2009	Kitt Peak	Spacewatch	·	3.0 km	MPC · JPL
487509	2014 TC_{20}	—	October 1, 2014	Kitt Peak	Spacewatch	·	2.9 km	MPC · JPL
487510	2014 TX_{37}	—	March 3, 2006	Mount Lemmon	Mount Lemmon Survey	·	3.2 km	MPC · JPL
487511	2014 TA_{40}	—	September 2, 2014	Haleakala	Pan-STARRS 1	EUN	1.8 km	MPC · JPL
487512	2014 TF_{44}	—	November 26, 2009	Mount Lemmon	Mount Lemmon Survey	·	2.9 km	MPC · JPL
487513	2014 TM_{47}	—	August 9, 2008	La Sagra	OAM	EMA	2.8 km	MPC · JPL
487514	2014 TO_{66}	—	October 1, 2003	Kitt Peak	Spacewatch	·	3.0 km	MPC · JPL
487515	2014 TW_{66}	—	October 1, 2003	Kitt Peak	Spacewatch	·	5.1 km	MPC · JPL
487516	2014 UM_{7}	—	February 27, 2012	Haleakala	Pan-STARRS 1	EOS	2.1 km	MPC · JPL
487517	2014 UB_{11}	—	September 28, 2008	Catalina	CSS	VER	3.2 km	MPC · JPL
487518	2014 UA_{23}	—	October 8, 2004	Anderson Mesa	LONEOS	·	2.6 km	MPC · JPL
487519	2014 UV_{26}	—	October 7, 2008	Mount Lemmon	Mount Lemmon Survey	·	3.2 km	MPC · JPL
487520	2014 UA_{28}	—	July 17, 2007	La Sagra	OAM	·	4.0 km	MPC · JPL
487521	2014 UQ_{54}	—	September 5, 2008	Kitt Peak	Spacewatch	·	4.5 km	MPC · JPL
487522	2014 UR_{55}	—	May 14, 2012	Mount Lemmon	Mount Lemmon Survey	EOS	2.8 km	MPC · JPL
487523	2014 UJ_{60}	—	November 10, 2009	Kitt Peak	Spacewatch	·	2.9 km	MPC · JPL
487524	2014 UG_{91}	—	March 31, 2008	Kitt Peak	Spacewatch	·	2.2 km	MPC · JPL
487525	2014 UE_{93}	—	August 30, 2008	La Sagra	OAM	·	4.3 km	MPC · JPL
487526	2014 UY_{96}	—	November 23, 2009	Kitt Peak	Spacewatch	EOS	2.2 km	MPC · JPL
487527	2014 US_{104}	—	November 19, 2009	Mount Lemmon	Mount Lemmon Survey	·	3.3 km	MPC · JPL
487528	2014 UH_{112}	—	May 1, 2006	Kitt Peak	Spacewatch	·	4.1 km	MPC · JPL
487529	2014 UM_{127}	—	September 5, 2008	Kitt Peak	Spacewatch	VER	2.7 km	MPC · JPL
487530	2014 UU_{132}	—	September 7, 2008	Catalina	CSS	·	3.9 km	MPC · JPL
487531	2014 UL_{136}	—	October 16, 2014	Kitt Peak	Spacewatch	EOS	2.0 km	MPC · JPL
487532	2014 UE_{149}	—	February 26, 2012	Mount Lemmon	Mount Lemmon Survey	·	3.4 km	MPC · JPL
487533	2014 UV_{154}	—	March 11, 2007	Kitt Peak	Spacewatch	·	2.5 km	MPC · JPL
487534	2014 UC_{161}	—	October 17, 2003	Kitt Peak	Spacewatch	·	3.9 km	MPC · JPL
487535	2014 UW_{169}	—	October 26, 2014	Haleakala	Pan-STARRS 1	L5	9.6 km	MPC · JPL
487536	2014 US_{172}	—	November 24, 2003	Kitt Peak	Spacewatch	VER	3.5 km	MPC · JPL
487537	2014 UH_{176}	—	November 24, 2009	Kitt Peak	Spacewatch	·	2.8 km	MPC · JPL
487538	2014 UN_{184}	—	March 15, 2012	Haleakala	Pan-STARRS 1	·	3.1 km	MPC · JPL
487539	2014 UV_{187}	—	August 13, 2012	Haleakala	Pan-STARRS 1	L5	7.5 km	MPC · JPL
487540	2014 UF_{189}	—	October 13, 2009	La Sagra	OAM	·	2.9 km	MPC · JPL
487541	2014 UV_{190}	—	October 3, 2003	Kitt Peak	Spacewatch	·	3.7 km	MPC · JPL
487542	2014 UF_{194}	—	March 13, 2007	Mount Lemmon	Mount Lemmon Survey	EOS	2.1 km	MPC · JPL
487543	2014 UY_{196}	—	September 30, 1997	Kitt Peak	Spacewatch	VER	3.1 km	MPC · JPL
487544	2014 UZ_{197}	—	October 16, 2014	Kitt Peak	Spacewatch	·	3.5 km	MPC · JPL
487545	2014 UB_{204}	—	August 24, 2012	Kitt Peak	Spacewatch	L5	7.5 km	MPC · JPL
487546	2014 UC_{213}	—	January 11, 2011	Kitt Peak	Spacewatch	·	3.8 km	MPC · JPL
487547	2014 VO_{3}	—	February 7, 2010	WISE	WISE	·	3.9 km	MPC · JPL
487548	2014 VH_{7}	—	November 8, 2010	Kitt Peak	Spacewatch	·	1.4 km	MPC · JPL
487549	2014 VB_{12}	—	February 23, 2007	Kitt Peak	Spacewatch	·	2.3 km	MPC · JPL
487550	2014 VD_{13}	—	December 10, 2009	Mount Lemmon	Mount Lemmon Survey	·	3.4 km	MPC · JPL
487551	2014 VA_{17}	—	November 10, 2009	Kitt Peak	Spacewatch	·	3.0 km	MPC · JPL
487552	2014 VT_{22}	—	October 3, 2014	Mount Lemmon	Mount Lemmon Survey	L5	8.7 km	MPC · JPL
487553	2014 VP_{24}	—	April 9, 2010	WISE	WISE	L5	10 km	MPC · JPL
487554	2014 VZ_{24}	—	July 2, 2011	Kitt Peak	Spacewatch	L5	8.3 km	MPC · JPL
487555	2014 VA_{25}	—	October 12, 2013	Kitt Peak	Spacewatch	L5	8.8 km	MPC · JPL
487556	2014 VF_{37}	—	December 9, 2004	Kitt Peak	Spacewatch	·	3.4 km	MPC · JPL
487557	2014 WJ_{20}	—	May 31, 2006	Mount Lemmon	Mount Lemmon Survey	·	3.9 km	MPC · JPL
487558	2014 WE_{48}	—	October 22, 2006	Mount Lemmon	Mount Lemmon Survey	3:2 · SHU	5.9 km	MPC · JPL
487559	2014 WX_{104}	—	April 13, 2012	Haleakala	Pan-STARRS 1	·	2.6 km	MPC · JPL
487560	2014 WV_{140}	—	September 29, 2005	Kitt Peak	Spacewatch	3:2	5.2 km	MPC · JPL
487561	2014 WM_{143}	—	January 27, 2011	Mount Lemmon	Mount Lemmon Survey	·	3.4 km	MPC · JPL
487562	2014 WK_{159}	—	April 24, 2012	Haleakala	Pan-STARRS 1	VER	3.4 km	MPC · JPL
487563	2014 WO_{165}	—	June 18, 2013	Haleakala	Pan-STARRS 1	·	1.3 km	MPC · JPL
487564	2014 WB_{183}	—	September 28, 2008	Mount Lemmon	Mount Lemmon Survey	·	3.3 km	MPC · JPL
487565	2014 WT_{239}	—	January 27, 2006	Mount Lemmon	Mount Lemmon Survey	KOR	1.4 km	MPC · JPL
487566	2014 WB_{279}	—	February 5, 2011	Mount Lemmon	Mount Lemmon Survey	·	2.4 km	MPC · JPL
487567	2014 WB_{315}	—	February 11, 2011	Mount Lemmon	Mount Lemmon Survey	·	1.7 km	MPC · JPL
487568	2014 WW_{349}	—	October 30, 2008	Catalina	CSS	·	4.7 km	MPC · JPL
487569	2014 WL_{360}	—	December 29, 2000	Kitt Peak	Spacewatch	·	2.2 km	MPC · JPL
487570	2014 WU_{364}	—	May 15, 2009	Mount Lemmon	Mount Lemmon Survey	L5	10 km	MPC · JPL
487571	2014 WL_{366}	—	February 24, 2006	Mount Lemmon	Mount Lemmon Survey	L5	8.8 km	MPC · JPL
487572	2014 WG_{387}	—	February 24, 2006	Mount Lemmon	Mount Lemmon Survey	L5	8.7 km	MPC · JPL
487573	2014 WZ_{391}	—	April 24, 2008	Kitt Peak	Spacewatch	L5	9.8 km	MPC · JPL
487574	2014 WF_{397}	—	June 30, 2013	Haleakala	Pan-STARRS 1	·	3.4 km	MPC · JPL
487575	2014 WW_{398}	—	March 6, 2011	Rodeo	Cullen, S.	·	3.7 km	MPC · JPL
487576	2014 YN_{13}	—	December 7, 2005	Catalina	CSS	·	1.9 km	MPC · JPL
487577	2014 YQ_{15}	—	December 27, 2014	Catalina	CSS	ATE · PHA · critical	220 m	MPC · JPL
487578	2015 AD_{28}	—	September 10, 2007	Kitt Peak	Spacewatch	THM	2.7 km	MPC · JPL
487579	2015 AK_{46}	—	March 13, 2010	WISE	WISE	·	2.8 km	MPC · JPL
487580	2015 BA_{92}	—	January 17, 2015	Haleakala	Pan-STARRS 1	APO	330 m	MPC · JPL
487581	2015 BE_{519}	—	April 27, 2006	Cerro Tololo	Deep Ecliptic Survey	twotino	287 km	MPC · JPL
487582	2015 DW_{130}	—	March 28, 1996	Kitt Peak	Spacewatch	H	600 m	MPC · JPL
487583	2015 FJ_{36}	—	March 20, 2015	Haleakala	Pan-STARRS 1	APO · critical	130 m	MPC · JPL
487584	2015 FD_{304}	—	August 30, 1998	Xinglong	SCAP	·	1.6 km	MPC · JPL
487585	2015 FM_{332}	—	September 26, 2006	Kitt Peak	Spacewatch	H	290 m	MPC · JPL
487586	2015 FT_{333}	—	April 19, 2007	Kitt Peak	Spacewatch	H	510 m	MPC · JPL
487587	2015 FY_{333}	—	October 14, 2007	Mount Lemmon	Mount Lemmon Survey	·	2.9 km	MPC · JPL
487588	2015 FF_{341}	—	August 2, 2013	Haleakala	Pan-STARRS 1	H	630 m	MPC · JPL
487589	2015 HU_{64}	—	April 11, 2007	Mount Lemmon	Mount Lemmon Survey	·	1.4 km	MPC · JPL
487590	2015 HR_{80}	—	September 17, 2012	Kitt Peak	Spacewatch	EOS	1.8 km	MPC · JPL
487591	2015 HY_{181}	—	February 13, 2012	Haleakala	Pan-STARRS 1	T_{j} (2.85)	4.7 km	MPC · JPL
487592	2015 KW_{4}	—	October 30, 2008	Mount Lemmon	Mount Lemmon Survey	H	460 m	MPC · JPL
487593	2015 KS_{35}	—	April 23, 2015	Haleakala	Pan-STARRS 1	·	1.2 km	MPC · JPL
487594	2015 KT_{40}	—	May 24, 2011	Haleakala	Pan-STARRS 1	·	1.1 km	MPC · JPL
487595	2015 KU_{107}	—	December 17, 2007	Mount Lemmon	Mount Lemmon Survey	·	2.3 km	MPC · JPL
487596	2015 KX_{116}	—	May 4, 2005	Kitt Peak	Spacewatch	·	750 m	MPC · JPL
487597	2015 KG_{121}	—	December 7, 2012	Mount Lemmon	Mount Lemmon Survey	·	2.4 km	MPC · JPL
487598	2015 KO_{132}	—	October 21, 2012	Haleakala	Pan-STARRS 1	·	1.4 km	MPC · JPL
487599	2015 LR_{11}	—	September 16, 2012	Catalina	CSS	·	870 m	MPC · JPL
487600	2015 LQ_{33}	—	June 13, 2015	Haleakala	Pan-STARRS 1	·	2.0 km	MPC · JPL

== 487601–487700 ==
back to top

Designation			Discovery			Properties		Ref
Permanent	Provisional	Named after	Date	Site	Discoverer(s)	Category	Diam.	Ref
487601	2015 LC_{34}	—	January 10, 2013	Kitt Peak	Spacewatch	EUN	1.1 km	MPC · JPL
487602	2015 LY_{37}	—	November 2, 2008	Mount Lemmon	Mount Lemmon Survey	·	1.7 km	MPC · JPL
487603	2015 MN_{7}	—	December 2, 2005	Mount Lemmon	Mount Lemmon Survey	·	2.7 km	MPC · JPL
487604	2015 ME_{8}	—	February 24, 2012	Mount Lemmon	Mount Lemmon Survey	·	2.8 km	MPC · JPL
487605	2015 MH_{11}	—	November 24, 2003	Kitt Peak	Spacewatch	H	460 m	MPC · JPL
487606	2015 MH_{15}	—	April 4, 2014	Haleakala	Pan-STARRS 1	EOS	1.4 km	MPC · JPL
487607	2015 ML_{33}	—	April 6, 2011	Mount Lemmon	Mount Lemmon Survey	PHO	970 m	MPC · JPL
487608	2015 ML_{46}	—	December 12, 2006	Mount Lemmon	Mount Lemmon Survey	EOS	2.3 km	MPC · JPL
487609	2015 MD_{48}	—	July 28, 2011	Haleakala	Pan-STARRS 1	·	1.2 km	MPC · JPL
487610	2015 MQ_{52}	—	January 10, 2013	Haleakala	Pan-STARRS 1	·	2.3 km	MPC · JPL
487611	2015 MA_{57}	—	September 6, 2008	Catalina	CSS	·	1.2 km	MPC · JPL
487612	2015 MO_{57}	—	December 21, 2008	Mount Lemmon	Mount Lemmon Survey	·	1.5 km	MPC · JPL
487613	2015 MB_{60}	—	November 22, 2009	Catalina	CSS	·	1.1 km	MPC · JPL
487614	2015 MD_{60}	—	November 30, 2000	Socorro	LINEAR	H	500 m	MPC · JPL
487615	2015 MD_{62}	—	December 21, 2006	Kitt Peak	Spacewatch	·	700 m	MPC · JPL
487616	2015 MP_{71}	—	September 21, 2011	Haleakala	Pan-STARRS 1	·	2.0 km	MPC · JPL
487617 Ingethiering	2015 MB_{80}	Ingethiering	October 20, 2012	Haleakala	Pan-STARRS 1	V	540 m	MPC · JPL
487618	2015 MT_{82}	—	June 20, 2010	WISE	WISE	·	2.5 km	MPC · JPL
487619	2015 MU_{84}	—	January 28, 2004	Kitt Peak	Spacewatch	·	1.5 km	MPC · JPL
487620	2015 MN_{89}	—	December 6, 2013	Haleakala	Pan-STARRS 1	H	590 m	MPC · JPL
487621	2015 ML_{98}	—	September 8, 2011	Haleakala	Pan-STARRS 1	·	1.6 km	MPC · JPL
487622	2015 MU_{99}	—	September 26, 2011	Haleakala	Pan-STARRS 1	·	1.7 km	MPC · JPL
487623	2015 MZ_{109}	—	September 28, 2003	Anderson Mesa	LONEOS	·	1.2 km	MPC · JPL
487624	2015 MV_{117}	—	October 25, 2011	Haleakala	Pan-STARRS 1	·	1.5 km	MPC · JPL
487625	2015 MT_{126}	—	July 26, 2011	Haleakala	Pan-STARRS 1	MAR	1.3 km	MPC · JPL
487626	2015 MJ_{127}	—	December 25, 2005	Kitt Peak	Spacewatch	·	1.1 km	MPC · JPL
487627	2015 NW_{4}	—	October 28, 2006	Catalina	CSS	·	2.9 km	MPC · JPL
487628	2015 NX_{8}	—	November 2, 2007	Mount Lemmon	Mount Lemmon Survey	·	1.1 km	MPC · JPL
487629	2015 NW_{18}	—	December 25, 2005	Mount Lemmon	Mount Lemmon Survey	V	630 m	MPC · JPL
487630	2015 NT_{21}	—	May 14, 2015	Haleakala	Pan-STARRS 1	MAR	1.1 km	MPC · JPL
487631	2015 NZ_{23}	—	March 2, 2006	Kitt Peak	Spacewatch	·	1.2 km	MPC · JPL
487632	2015 NM_{24}	—	October 26, 2005	Kitt Peak	Spacewatch	·	740 m	MPC · JPL
487633	2015 OY_{1}	—	September 12, 2007	Catalina	CSS	·	1.1 km	MPC · JPL
487634	2015 OD_{3}	—	December 22, 2008	Kitt Peak	Spacewatch	·	1.2 km	MPC · JPL
487635	2015 OS_{11}	—	June 22, 2015	Mount Lemmon	Mount Lemmon Survey	·	2.9 km	MPC · JPL
487636	2015 OR_{12}	—	November 16, 2009	Mount Lemmon	Mount Lemmon Survey	V	600 m	MPC · JPL
487637	2015 OD_{18}	—	February 3, 2009	Kitt Peak	Spacewatch	·	2.2 km	MPC · JPL
487638	2015 OQ_{19}	—	May 7, 2010	Kitt Peak	Spacewatch	EUN	1.1 km	MPC · JPL
487639	2015 OP_{22}	—	April 13, 2011	Mount Lemmon	Mount Lemmon Survey	·	930 m	MPC · JPL
487640	2015 OY_{22}	—	December 6, 2013	Haleakala	Pan-STARRS 1	H	610 m	MPC · JPL
487641	2015 OP_{24}	—	April 22, 2007	Mount Lemmon	Mount Lemmon Survey	·	1.3 km	MPC · JPL
487642	2015 OV_{24}	—	November 26, 2005	Kitt Peak	Spacewatch	·	810 m	MPC · JPL
487643	2015 ON_{36}	—	September 16, 2010	Kitt Peak	Spacewatch	·	3.2 km	MPC · JPL
487644	2015 OV_{40}	—	March 11, 2008	Mount Lemmon	Mount Lemmon Survey	·	3.3 km	MPC · JPL
487645	2015 OA_{64}	—	October 25, 2011	Haleakala	Pan-STARRS 1	·	1.6 km	MPC · JPL
487646	2015 OS_{64}	—	October 28, 2011	Mount Lemmon	Mount Lemmon Survey	·	1.6 km	MPC · JPL
487647	2015 ON_{66}	—	January 8, 2010	Kitt Peak	Spacewatch	·	660 m	MPC · JPL
487648	2015 OH_{67}	—	May 30, 2006	Mount Lemmon	Mount Lemmon Survey	·	2.0 km	MPC · JPL
487649	2015 OS_{68}	—	January 17, 2005	Kitt Peak	Spacewatch	MAR	970 m	MPC · JPL
487650	2015 OS_{71}	—	January 2, 2009	Kitt Peak	Spacewatch	·	1.0 km	MPC · JPL
487651	2015 OY_{71}	—	January 8, 2006	Mount Lemmon	Mount Lemmon Survey	·	970 m	MPC · JPL
487652	2015 OD_{75}	—	February 27, 2006	Mount Lemmon	Mount Lemmon Survey	·	1.2 km	MPC · JPL
487653	2015 OT_{75}	—	August 1, 2008	La Sagra	OAM	·	810 m	MPC · JPL
487654	2015 OM_{76}	—	September 29, 2008	Kitt Peak	Spacewatch	·	910 m	MPC · JPL
487655	2015 PN_{6}	—	June 27, 2015	Haleakala	Pan-STARRS 1	·	2.4 km	MPC · JPL
487656	2015 PB_{32}	—	May 9, 2014	Haleakala	Pan-STARRS 1	·	2.0 km	MPC · JPL
487657	2015 PY_{33}	—	September 15, 2007	Catalina	CSS	MAR	950 m	MPC · JPL
487658	2015 PF_{36}	—	December 3, 2012	Mount Lemmon	Mount Lemmon Survey	·	850 m	MPC · JPL
487659	2015 PC_{38}	—	September 9, 2008	Mount Lemmon	Mount Lemmon Survey	·	1.0 km	MPC · JPL
487660	2015 PL_{38}	—	January 17, 2007	Kitt Peak	Spacewatch	EOS	2.2 km	MPC · JPL
487661	2015 PS_{38}	—	November 12, 2012	Haleakala	Pan-STARRS 1	V	750 m	MPC · JPL
487662	2015 PJ_{39}	—	January 26, 2012	Haleakala	Pan-STARRS 1	·	3.3 km	MPC · JPL
487663	2015 PE_{40}	—	January 16, 2013	Mount Lemmon	Mount Lemmon Survey	·	1.8 km	MPC · JPL
487664	2015 PS_{41}	—	September 24, 2008	Mount Lemmon	Mount Lemmon Survey	V	670 m	MPC · JPL
487665	2015 PV_{43}	—	November 3, 2011	Catalina	CSS	·	1.7 km	MPC · JPL
487666	2015 PD_{54}	—	September 4, 2011	Haleakala	Pan-STARRS 1	·	940 m	MPC · JPL
487667	2015 PB_{56}	—	November 2, 2011	Mount Lemmon	Mount Lemmon Survey	·	1.2 km	MPC · JPL
487668	2015 PO_{60}	—	December 27, 2006	Kitt Peak	Spacewatch	·	2.2 km	MPC · JPL
487669	2015 PO_{92}	—	January 19, 2004	Kitt Peak	Spacewatch	·	570 m	MPC · JPL
487670	2015 PH_{101}	—	September 20, 2009	Mount Lemmon	Mount Lemmon Survey	·	890 m	MPC · JPL
487671	2015 PP_{113}	—	July 17, 2010	WISE	WISE	·	2.5 km	MPC · JPL
487672	2015 PT_{115}	—	January 18, 2009	Kitt Peak	Spacewatch	·	1.3 km	MPC · JPL
487673	2015 PC_{117}	—	October 22, 2012	Haleakala	Pan-STARRS 1	·	690 m	MPC · JPL
487674	2015 PT_{135}	—	August 30, 2011	Haleakala	Pan-STARRS 1	EUN	910 m	MPC · JPL
487675	2015 PR_{153}	—	October 8, 2012	Haleakala	Pan-STARRS 1	·	610 m	MPC · JPL
487676	2015 PG_{161}	—	January 17, 2007	Kitt Peak	Spacewatch	EOS	1.5 km	MPC · JPL
487677	2015 PT_{184}	—	January 24, 2007	Kitt Peak	Spacewatch	·	2.2 km	MPC · JPL
487678	2015 PT_{226}	—	November 11, 2007	Mount Lemmon	Mount Lemmon Survey	·	2.2 km	MPC · JPL
487679	2015 PS_{229}	—	October 8, 2005	Catalina	CSS	·	1.0 km	MPC · JPL
487680	2015 PV_{231}	—	February 9, 2013	Haleakala	Pan-STARRS 1	·	1.5 km	MPC · JPL
487681	2015 PV_{242}	—	July 3, 2011	Mount Lemmon	Mount Lemmon Survey	MAS	800 m	MPC · JPL
487682	2015 PB_{260}	—	February 6, 2013	Kitt Peak	Spacewatch	·	1.8 km	MPC · JPL
487683	2015 PP_{271}	—	August 30, 2005	Kitt Peak	Spacewatch	·	710 m	MPC · JPL
487684	2015 PR_{283}	—	September 6, 2008	Catalina	CSS	·	990 m	MPC · JPL
487685	2015 PR_{289}	—	November 3, 2007	Catalina	CSS	EUN	1.3 km	MPC · JPL
487686	2015 PH_{290}	—	October 23, 2011	Haleakala	Pan-STARRS 1	·	2.0 km	MPC · JPL
487687	2015 PJ_{294}	—	October 15, 2009	Mount Lemmon	Mount Lemmon Survey	·	4.3 km	MPC · JPL
487688	2015 PN_{294}	—	August 8, 2004	Socorro	LINEAR	V	720 m	MPC · JPL
487689	2015 PP_{294}	—	October 24, 2011	Haleakala	Pan-STARRS 1	·	2.2 km	MPC · JPL
487690	2015 PD_{295}	—	November 19, 2008	Kitt Peak	Spacewatch	V	570 m	MPC · JPL
487691	2015 PU_{298}	—	May 8, 2014	Kitt Peak	Spacewatch	·	3.2 km	MPC · JPL
487692	2015 PN_{299}	—	September 9, 2004	Socorro	LINEAR	·	2.6 km	MPC · JPL
487693	2015 PD_{308}	—	August 12, 2010	WISE	WISE	T_{j} (2.93)	3.1 km	MPC · JPL
487694	2015 PT_{308}	—	January 2, 2014	Mount Lemmon	Mount Lemmon Survey	H	500 m	MPC · JPL
487695	2015 PC_{311}	—	September 14, 2007	Catalina	CSS	H	650 m	MPC · JPL
487696	2015 RJ_{1}	—	September 17, 2004	Kitt Peak	Spacewatch	EOS	2.0 km	MPC · JPL
487697	2015 RE_{3}	—	July 14, 2015	Haleakala	Pan-STARRS 1	·	1.0 km	MPC · JPL
487698	2015 RS_{18}	—	October 25, 2011	Haleakala	Pan-STARRS 1	EUN	1.0 km	MPC · JPL
487699	2015 RP_{21}	—	September 14, 2007	Mount Lemmon	Mount Lemmon Survey	KON	1.8 km	MPC · JPL
487700	2015 RR_{21}	—	September 21, 2011	Kitt Peak	Spacewatch	·	1.5 km	MPC · JPL

== 487701–487800 ==
back to top

Designation			Discovery			Properties		Ref
Permanent	Provisional	Named after	Date	Site	Discoverer(s)	Category	Diam.	Ref
487701	2015 RJ_{24}	—	October 23, 2012	Haleakala	Pan-STARRS 1	·	790 m	MPC · JPL
487702	2015 RY_{24}	—	August 29, 2008	La Sagra	OAM	·	860 m	MPC · JPL
487703	2015 RQ_{25}	—	January 18, 2008	Mount Lemmon	Mount Lemmon Survey	·	2.0 km	MPC · JPL
487704	2015 RZ_{26}	—	August 4, 2010	WISE	WISE	·	2.0 km	MPC · JPL
487705	2015 RO_{28}	—	August 28, 2011	Haleakala	Pan-STARRS 1	·	1.3 km	MPC · JPL
487706	2015 RG_{29}	—	September 24, 2000	Kitt Peak	Spacewatch	·	1.2 km	MPC · JPL
487707	2015 RF_{31}	—	November 3, 2004	Anderson Mesa	LONEOS	·	3.0 km	MPC · JPL
487708	2015 RQ_{34}	—	December 24, 2011	Mount Lemmon	Mount Lemmon Survey	·	2.1 km	MPC · JPL
487709	2015 RS_{37}	—	September 14, 1998	Socorro	LINEAR	THB	3.1 km	MPC · JPL
487710	2015 RB_{45}	—	September 26, 2008	Kitt Peak	Spacewatch	·	910 m	MPC · JPL
487711	2015 RY_{46}	—	September 13, 2007	Kitt Peak	Spacewatch	·	790 m	MPC · JPL
487712	2015 RT_{47}	—	November 19, 2009	Kitt Peak	Spacewatch	·	690 m	MPC · JPL
487713	2015 RE_{49}	—	March 5, 2013	Haleakala	Pan-STARRS 1	(5)	1.3 km	MPC · JPL
487714	2015 RK_{49}	—	November 8, 2007	Kitt Peak	Spacewatch	·	1.0 km	MPC · JPL
487715	2015 RC_{52}	—	September 5, 2008	Kitt Peak	Spacewatch	·	1 km	MPC · JPL
487716	2015 RX_{52}	—	August 23, 2007	Kitt Peak	Spacewatch	·	1.2 km	MPC · JPL
487717	2015 RK_{53}	—	February 8, 2008	Kitt Peak	Spacewatch	·	1.8 km	MPC · JPL
487718	2015 RO_{54}	—	June 2, 2008	Mount Lemmon	Mount Lemmon Survey	·	790 m	MPC · JPL
487719	2015 RH_{57}	—	April 8, 2002	Kitt Peak	Spacewatch	MAS	750 m	MPC · JPL
487720	2015 RS_{63}	—	July 28, 2010	WISE	WISE	·	3.0 km	MPC · JPL
487721	2015 RF_{71}	—	September 9, 2004	Kitt Peak	Spacewatch	LIX	2.9 km	MPC · JPL
487722	2015 RK_{71}	—	November 23, 2011	Mount Lemmon	Mount Lemmon Survey	·	1.7 km	MPC · JPL
487723	2015 RN_{73}	—	August 24, 2011	Haleakala	Pan-STARRS 1	NYS	1.2 km	MPC · JPL
487724	2015 RY_{84}	—	December 10, 2005	Kitt Peak	Spacewatch	·	2.5 km	MPC · JPL
487725	2015 RR_{88}	—	October 17, 2010	Catalina	CSS	·	2.1 km	MPC · JPL
487726	2015 RG_{93}	—	March 19, 2010	Mount Lemmon	Mount Lemmon Survey	·	810 m	MPC · JPL
487727	2015 RS_{93}	—	January 8, 2013	Mount Lemmon	Mount Lemmon Survey	·	1.3 km	MPC · JPL
487728	2015 RA_{95}	—	November 7, 2012	Kitt Peak	Spacewatch	·	680 m	MPC · JPL
487729	2015 RO_{98}	—	September 7, 2004	Kitt Peak	Spacewatch	·	2.1 km	MPC · JPL
487730	2015 RS_{98}	—	December 5, 2005	Socorro	LINEAR	·	890 m	MPC · JPL
487731	2015 RX_{98}	—	August 28, 2006	Catalina	CSS	·	1.7 km	MPC · JPL
487732	2015 RM_{100}	—	April 22, 2007	Kitt Peak	Spacewatch	MAS	710 m	MPC · JPL
487733	2015 RL_{101}	—	July 1, 2011	Haleakala	Pan-STARRS 1	MAR	1.2 km	MPC · JPL
487734	2015 RW_{101}	—	August 25, 2011	La Sagra	OAM	MAS	770 m	MPC · JPL
487735	2015 RS_{102}	—	October 27, 2011	Catalina	CSS	·	1.1 km	MPC · JPL
487736	2015 RC_{103}	—	July 2, 2011	Mount Lemmon	Mount Lemmon Survey	·	1.2 km	MPC · JPL
487737	2015 RN_{105}	—	November 14, 2007	Kitt Peak	Spacewatch	·	1.1 km	MPC · JPL
487738	2015 RR_{105}	—	November 12, 2005	Kitt Peak	Spacewatch	·	770 m	MPC · JPL
487739	2015 RW_{107}	—	December 28, 2005	Mount Lemmon	Mount Lemmon Survey	·	1.8 km	MPC · JPL
487740	2015 RX_{107}	—	October 13, 1993	Kitt Peak	Spacewatch	·	660 m	MPC · JPL
487741	2015 RJ_{108}	—	April 5, 2000	Socorro	LINEAR	·	2.3 km	MPC · JPL
487742	2015 RN_{108}	—	May 11, 2010	Kitt Peak	Spacewatch	·	1.4 km	MPC · JPL
487743	2015 RX_{108}	—	April 13, 2013	Haleakala	Pan-STARRS 1	·	3.3 km	MPC · JPL
487744	2015 RM_{110}	—	February 21, 2009	Kitt Peak	Spacewatch	·	870 m	MPC · JPL
487745	2015 RF_{113}	—	January 9, 2013	Kitt Peak	Spacewatch	MAS	630 m	MPC · JPL
487746	2015 RM_{115}	—	November 10, 2004	Kitt Peak	Spacewatch	·	1.4 km	MPC · JPL
487747	2015 RD_{116}	—	October 9, 2004	Anderson Mesa	LONEOS	·	3.5 km	MPC · JPL
487748	2015 RM_{116}	—	February 15, 2010	Kitt Peak	Spacewatch	·	860 m	MPC · JPL
487749	2015 RU_{117}	—	September 7, 2011	Siding Spring	SSS	·	1.6 km	MPC · JPL
487750	2015 RB_{119}	—	June 2, 2014	Haleakala	Pan-STARRS 1	EUN	1.2 km	MPC · JPL
487751	2015 RK_{122}	—	October 15, 2001	Palomar	NEAT	·	2.2 km	MPC · JPL
487752	2015 RE_{123}	—	September 12, 2007	Catalina	CSS	·	990 m	MPC · JPL
487753	2015 RP_{129}	—	October 16, 2011	Kitt Peak	Spacewatch	·	1.3 km	MPC · JPL
487754	2015 RC_{133}	—	April 4, 2014	Mount Lemmon	Mount Lemmon Survey	·	540 m	MPC · JPL
487755	2015 RU_{134}	—	March 8, 2013	Haleakala	Pan-STARRS 1	·	1.4 km	MPC · JPL
487756	2015 RF_{156}	—	February 15, 2010	Kitt Peak	Spacewatch	·	920 m	MPC · JPL
487757	2015 RD_{192}	—	October 24, 2011	Kitt Peak	Spacewatch	·	1.4 km	MPC · JPL
487758	2015 RG_{193}	—	October 6, 2004	Kitt Peak	Spacewatch	·	2.5 km	MPC · JPL
487759	2015 RH_{194}	—	September 12, 2010	Kitt Peak	Spacewatch	KOR	1.3 km	MPC · JPL
487760	2015 RW_{194}	—	July 29, 2008	Kitt Peak	Spacewatch	·	570 m	MPC · JPL
487761 Frankbrandner	2015 RX_{194}	Frankbrandner	October 26, 2011	Haleakala	Pan-STARRS 1	·	1.3 km	MPC · JPL
487762	2015 RD_{200}	—	October 30, 2010	Mount Lemmon	Mount Lemmon Survey	·	2.4 km	MPC · JPL
487763	2015 RV_{200}	—	October 1, 2011	Kitt Peak	Spacewatch	·	1.3 km	MPC · JPL
487764	2015 RG_{201}	—	November 11, 2010	Mount Lemmon	Mount Lemmon Survey	·	1.4 km	MPC · JPL
487765	2015 RV_{201}	—	February 28, 2014	Haleakala	Pan-STARRS 1	MAS	640 m	MPC · JPL
487766	2015 RU_{202}	—	October 7, 2004	Kitt Peak	Spacewatch	·	2.5 km	MPC · JPL
487767	2015 RD_{205}	—	April 1, 2013	Kitt Peak	Spacewatch	·	1.6 km	MPC · JPL
487768	2015 RM_{205}	—	October 18, 2006	Kitt Peak	Spacewatch	HOF	2.5 km	MPC · JPL
487769	2015 RQ_{205}	—	April 10, 2013	Haleakala	Pan-STARRS 1	KOR	1.2 km	MPC · JPL
487770	2015 RB_{207}	—	August 10, 2004	Socorro	LINEAR	·	2.4 km	MPC · JPL
487771	2015 RG_{208}	—	July 22, 2011	Haleakala	Pan-STARRS 1	·	1.5 km	MPC · JPL
487772	2015 RL_{208}	—	October 26, 2011	Haleakala	Pan-STARRS 1	·	1.4 km	MPC · JPL
487773	2015 RP_{208}	—	October 6, 2004	Kitt Peak	Spacewatch	·	2.4 km	MPC · JPL
487774	2015 RH_{213}	—	August 28, 2005	Kitt Peak	Spacewatch	·	620 m	MPC · JPL
487775	2015 RB_{214}	—	January 19, 2013	Mount Lemmon	Mount Lemmon Survey	·	1.1 km	MPC · JPL
487776	2015 RJ_{217}	—	September 12, 2004	Kitt Peak	Spacewatch	·	2.1 km	MPC · JPL
487777	2015 RR_{220}	—	April 29, 2010	WISE	WISE	·	2.4 km	MPC · JPL
487778	2015 RB_{222}	—	August 27, 2006	Kitt Peak	Spacewatch	·	1.4 km	MPC · JPL
487779	2015 RJ_{222}	—	October 4, 2004	Kitt Peak	Spacewatch	·	1.9 km	MPC · JPL
487780	2015 RG_{224}	—	October 12, 2010	Mount Lemmon	Mount Lemmon Survey	·	1.6 km	MPC · JPL
487781	2015 RP_{224}	—	December 14, 2004	Kitt Peak	Spacewatch	·	2.4 km	MPC · JPL
487782	2015 RT_{226}	—	July 30, 2014	Haleakala	Pan-STARRS 1	·	2.4 km	MPC · JPL
487783	2015 RC_{228}	—	October 12, 2007	Mount Lemmon	Mount Lemmon Survey	·	920 m	MPC · JPL
487784	2015 RJ_{229}	—	October 7, 2004	Kitt Peak	Spacewatch	·	2.0 km	MPC · JPL
487785	2015 RO_{229}	—	December 28, 2005	Kitt Peak	Spacewatch	·	1.6 km	MPC · JPL
487786	2015 RY_{231}	—	April 7, 2005	Kitt Peak	Spacewatch	(5)	1.1 km	MPC · JPL
487787	2015 RV_{235}	—	March 22, 2009	Catalina	CSS	EUN	1.3 km	MPC · JPL
487788	2015 RV_{236}	—	January 7, 2006	Mount Lemmon	Mount Lemmon Survey	·	2.6 km	MPC · JPL
487789	2015 RV_{237}	—	February 26, 2004	Socorro	LINEAR	EUN	1.3 km	MPC · JPL
487790	2015 RW_{237}	—	March 12, 2007	Mount Lemmon	Mount Lemmon Survey	·	2.4 km	MPC · JPL
487791	2015 RL_{238}	—	December 27, 2005	Kitt Peak	Spacewatch	EOS	1.6 km	MPC · JPL
487792	2015 RH_{239}	—	October 15, 2007	Mount Lemmon	Mount Lemmon Survey	·	1.8 km	MPC · JPL
487793	2015 RP_{239}	—	June 28, 2014	Haleakala	Pan-STARRS 1	·	3.6 km	MPC · JPL
487794	2015 RS_{239}	—	February 8, 2013	Haleakala	Pan-STARRS 1	MAR	1.1 km	MPC · JPL
487795	2015 RZ_{240}	—	July 29, 2014	Haleakala	Pan-STARRS 1	·	2.5 km	MPC · JPL
487796	2015 RJ_{241}	—	September 14, 2005	Kitt Peak	Spacewatch	·	1.8 km	MPC · JPL
487797	2015 RM_{242}	—	May 15, 2008	Mount Lemmon	Mount Lemmon Survey	·	4.1 km	MPC · JPL
487798	2015 SY_{1}	—	March 16, 2007	Mount Lemmon	Mount Lemmon Survey	·	920 m	MPC · JPL
487799	2015 SA_{3}	—	October 22, 2005	Kitt Peak	Spacewatch	·	790 m	MPC · JPL
487800	2015 SE_{4}	—	April 1, 2010	WISE	WISE	·	4.1 km	MPC · JPL

== 487801–487900 ==
back to top

Designation			Discovery			Properties		Ref
Permanent	Provisional	Named after	Date	Site	Discoverer(s)	Category	Diam.	Ref
487801	2015 SV_{4}	—	November 30, 2005	Kitt Peak	Spacewatch	V	610 m	MPC · JPL
487802	2015 SL_{5}	—	August 23, 2011	La Sagra	OAM	PHO	1.1 km	MPC · JPL
487803	2015 SS_{5}	—	September 25, 2009	Mount Lemmon	Mount Lemmon Survey	·	2.7 km	MPC · JPL
487804	2015 SH_{6}	—	October 9, 2004	Kitt Peak	Spacewatch	LIX	2.5 km	MPC · JPL
487805	2015 SZ_{7}	—	September 12, 2004	Kitt Peak	Spacewatch	·	2.3 km	MPC · JPL
487806	2015 SH_{11}	—	October 17, 2006	Catalina	CSS	AGN	1.1 km	MPC · JPL
487807	2015 SO_{13}	—	October 23, 2011	Kitt Peak	Spacewatch	·	1.9 km	MPC · JPL
487808	2015 SB_{14}	—	December 29, 2008	Mount Lemmon	Mount Lemmon Survey	V	710 m	MPC · JPL
487809	2015 SQ_{14}	—	February 10, 2010	Kitt Peak	Spacewatch	V	620 m	MPC · JPL
487810	2015 TE_{2}	—	December 15, 2010	Mount Lemmon	Mount Lemmon Survey	·	2.1 km	MPC · JPL
487811	2015 TO_{4}	—	September 3, 2010	Mount Lemmon	Mount Lemmon Survey	H	460 m	MPC · JPL
487812	2015 TD_{13}	—	July 28, 2011	Haleakala	Pan-STARRS 1	·	1.5 km	MPC · JPL
487813	2015 TD_{18}	—	November 3, 2011	Catalina	CSS	·	1.3 km	MPC · JPL
487814	2015 TR_{22}	—	March 29, 2009	Kitt Peak	Spacewatch	·	1.4 km	MPC · JPL
487815	2015 TU_{22}	—	September 15, 2010	Kitt Peak	Spacewatch	·	2.2 km	MPC · JPL
487816	2015 TW_{22}	—	October 24, 1998	Kitt Peak	Spacewatch	LIX	3.5 km	MPC · JPL
487817	2015 TZ_{22}	—	April 19, 2009	Mount Lemmon	Mount Lemmon Survey	·	1.5 km	MPC · JPL
487818	2015 TQ_{23}	—	January 14, 2002	Kitt Peak	Spacewatch	MAS	1.2 km	MPC · JPL
487819	2015 TJ_{25}	—	October 17, 2007	Catalina	CSS	·	1.4 km	MPC · JPL
487820	2015 TB_{27}	—	August 28, 2006	Kitt Peak	Spacewatch	·	1.5 km	MPC · JPL
487821	2015 TF_{27}	—	September 16, 2001	Socorro	LINEAR	·	2.1 km	MPC · JPL
487822	2015 TH_{65}	—	September 4, 2011	Haleakala	Pan-STARRS 1	V	730 m	MPC · JPL
487823	2015 TN_{66}	—	April 16, 2004	Kitt Peak	Spacewatch	·	1.6 km	MPC · JPL
487824	2015 TQ_{66}	—	December 19, 2003	Kitt Peak	Spacewatch	·	1.8 km	MPC · JPL
487825	2015 TL_{67}	—	December 22, 2005	Kitt Peak	Spacewatch	·	2.1 km	MPC · JPL
487826	2015 TL_{69}	—	December 15, 2004	Kitt Peak	Spacewatch	·	2.4 km	MPC · JPL
487827	2015 TY_{70}	—	May 23, 2010	WISE	WISE	·	2.6 km	MPC · JPL
487828	2015 TZ_{72}	—	September 17, 2009	Kitt Peak	Spacewatch	VER	2.5 km	MPC · JPL
487829	2015 TF_{73}	—	March 11, 2008	Mount Lemmon	Mount Lemmon Survey	·	2.2 km	MPC · JPL
487830	2015 TD_{74}	—	November 8, 2010	Kitt Peak	Spacewatch	·	1.9 km	MPC · JPL
487831	2015 TK_{75}	—	September 18, 2009	Kitt Peak	Spacewatch	·	2.9 km	MPC · JPL
487832	2015 TK_{76}	—	October 9, 2004	Kitt Peak	Spacewatch	·	2.1 km	MPC · JPL
487833	2015 TC_{77}	—	November 19, 2006	Kitt Peak	Spacewatch	·	1.5 km	MPC · JPL
487834	2015 TN_{77}	—	March 5, 2008	Mount Lemmon	Mount Lemmon Survey	AGN	1.2 km	MPC · JPL
487835	2015 TQ_{77}	—	September 16, 2009	Kitt Peak	Spacewatch	·	2.3 km	MPC · JPL
487836	2015 TK_{80}	—	October 12, 1993	Kitt Peak	Spacewatch	·	2.6 km	MPC · JPL
487837	2015 TX_{82}	—	October 15, 2004	Mount Lemmon	Mount Lemmon Survey	·	1.6 km	MPC · JPL
487838	2015 TF_{84}	—	April 19, 2012	Mount Lemmon	Mount Lemmon Survey	·	2.8 km	MPC · JPL
487839	2015 TW_{84}	—	October 24, 2009	Kitt Peak	Spacewatch	·	2.8 km	MPC · JPL
487840	2015 TZ_{85}	—	October 1, 2005	Kitt Peak	Spacewatch	KOR	1.4 km	MPC · JPL
487841	2015 TQ_{88}	—	September 18, 1995	Kitt Peak	Spacewatch	KOR	1.1 km	MPC · JPL
487842	2015 TF_{89}	—	November 2, 1999	Kitt Peak	Spacewatch	·	2.0 km	MPC · JPL
487843	2015 TC_{91}	—	June 27, 2014	Haleakala	Pan-STARRS 1	·	2.0 km	MPC · JPL
487844	2015 TZ_{93}	—	October 18, 2011	Kitt Peak	Spacewatch	·	1.0 km	MPC · JPL
487845	2015 TA_{96}	—	September 17, 2009	Mount Lemmon	Mount Lemmon Survey	EOS	1.6 km	MPC · JPL
487846	2015 TE_{96}	—	January 8, 2010	Mount Lemmon	Mount Lemmon Survey	·	750 m	MPC · JPL
487847	2015 TY_{96}	—	July 1, 2014	Haleakala	Pan-STARRS 1	·	2.7 km	MPC · JPL
487848	2015 TX_{99}	—	November 19, 2009	Kitt Peak	Spacewatch	CYB	2.7 km	MPC · JPL
487849	2015 TJ_{101}	—	November 7, 2005	Mauna Kea	A. Boattini	·	2.4 km	MPC · JPL
487850	2015 TA_{103}	—	March 31, 2003	Kitt Peak	Spacewatch	·	1.2 km	MPC · JPL
487851	2015 TT_{103}	—	April 19, 2013	Haleakala	Pan-STARRS 1	·	1.9 km	MPC · JPL
487852	2015 TA_{104}	—	July 24, 2011	La Sagra	OAM	·	1.2 km	MPC · JPL
487853	2015 TO_{104}	—	September 11, 2004	Kitt Peak	Spacewatch	EOS	1.5 km	MPC · JPL
487854	2015 TW_{104}	—	September 11, 2004	Kitt Peak	Spacewatch	TEL	1.1 km	MPC · JPL
487855	2015 TN_{105}	—	January 22, 2006	Mount Lemmon	Mount Lemmon Survey	·	2.9 km	MPC · JPL
487856	2015 TZ_{105}	—	September 27, 2009	Kitt Peak	Spacewatch	EOS	2.0 km	MPC · JPL
487857	2015 TF_{107}	—	June 7, 2013	Haleakala	Pan-STARRS 1	·	2.7 km	MPC · JPL
487858	2015 TP_{107}	—	August 28, 2009	Kitt Peak	Spacewatch	·	2.0 km	MPC · JPL
487859	2015 TT_{110}	—	March 26, 2007	Mount Lemmon	Mount Lemmon Survey	·	2.9 km	MPC · JPL
487860	2015 TC_{113}	—	February 21, 2006	Mount Lemmon	Mount Lemmon Survey	·	2.6 km	MPC · JPL
487861	2015 TD_{113}	—	March 4, 2005	Mount Lemmon	Mount Lemmon Survey	·	1.5 km	MPC · JPL
487862	2015 TU_{113}	—	April 29, 2008	Mount Lemmon	Mount Lemmon Survey	·	2.1 km	MPC · JPL
487863	2015 TP_{114}	—	September 18, 2011	Mount Lemmon	Mount Lemmon Survey	V	550 m	MPC · JPL
487864	2015 TE_{115}	—	September 25, 2011	Haleakala	Pan-STARRS 1	·	1.2 km	MPC · JPL
487865	2015 TJ_{117}	—	February 8, 2008	Kitt Peak	Spacewatch	·	1.6 km	MPC · JPL
487866	2015 TK_{117}	—	May 5, 2008	Kitt Peak	Spacewatch	·	3.3 km	MPC · JPL
487867	2015 TB_{123}	—	July 29, 2014	Haleakala	Pan-STARRS 1	·	2.9 km	MPC · JPL
487868	2015 TZ_{123}	—	August 24, 2011	Haleakala	Pan-STARRS 1	V	560 m	MPC · JPL
487869	2015 TW_{124}	—	July 1, 2014	Haleakala	Pan-STARRS 1	·	1.8 km	MPC · JPL
487870	2015 TP_{125}	—	December 25, 2005	Kitt Peak	Spacewatch	EOS	1.7 km	MPC · JPL
487871	2015 TF_{126}	—	December 3, 2010	Kitt Peak	Spacewatch	·	2.8 km	MPC · JPL
487872	2015 TL_{126}	—	November 25, 2011	Haleakala	Pan-STARRS 1	·	2.7 km	MPC · JPL
487873	2015 TB_{128}	—	February 16, 2012	Haleakala	Pan-STARRS 1	·	1.8 km	MPC · JPL
487874	2015 TN_{128}	—	July 27, 2014	Haleakala	Pan-STARRS 1	·	2.5 km	MPC · JPL
487875	2015 TP_{130}	—	December 24, 2011	Mount Lemmon	Mount Lemmon Survey	·	1.7 km	MPC · JPL
487876	2015 TR_{130}	—	May 8, 2013	Haleakala	Pan-STARRS 1	·	2.8 km	MPC · JPL
487877	2015 TW_{130}	—	December 15, 2007	Mount Lemmon	Mount Lemmon Survey	·	1.5 km	MPC · JPL
487878	2015 TC_{133}	—	July 8, 2014	Haleakala	Pan-STARRS 1	GEF	1.1 km	MPC · JPL
487879	2015 TS_{133}	—	November 7, 2010	Mount Lemmon	Mount Lemmon Survey	·	3.6 km	MPC · JPL
487880	2015 TX_{134}	—	September 11, 2015	Haleakala	Pan-STARRS 1	·	1.2 km	MPC · JPL
487881	2015 TX_{136}	—	November 16, 2011	Kitt Peak	Spacewatch	·	1.7 km	MPC · JPL
487882	2015 TX_{138}	—	February 21, 2007	Kitt Peak	Spacewatch	·	2.1 km	MPC · JPL
487883	2015 TH_{139}	—	April 20, 2004	Socorro	LINEAR	·	1.6 km	MPC · JPL
487884 Saoras	2015 TS_{142}	Saoras	August 28, 2009	Zelenchukskaya	T. V. Krjačko, B. Satovski	·	2.4 km	MPC · JPL
487885	2015 TP_{145}	—	December 1, 2004	Catalina	CSS	·	4.5 km	MPC · JPL
487886	2015 TC_{146}	—	October 4, 2006	Mount Lemmon	Mount Lemmon Survey	·	1.8 km	MPC · JPL
487887	2015 TM_{146}	—	February 15, 2013	Haleakala	Pan-STARRS 1	·	1.3 km	MPC · JPL
487888	2015 TC_{147}	—	January 8, 2013	Mount Lemmon	Mount Lemmon Survey	·	1.3 km	MPC · JPL
487889	2015 TC_{148}	—	November 27, 2011	Catalina	CSS	·	1.8 km	MPC · JPL
487890	2015 TD_{148}	—	September 27, 2006	Kitt Peak	Spacewatch	·	1.8 km	MPC · JPL
487891	2015 TH_{149}	—	March 31, 2009	Mount Lemmon	Mount Lemmon Survey	·	1.2 km	MPC · JPL
487892	2015 TR_{152}	—	October 30, 2011	Kitt Peak	Spacewatch	·	1.0 km	MPC · JPL
487893	2015 TM_{153}	—	October 26, 2008	Kitt Peak	Spacewatch	·	920 m	MPC · JPL
487894	2015 TW_{155}	—	September 3, 2008	Kitt Peak	Spacewatch	V	610 m	MPC · JPL
487895	2015 TY_{156}	—	September 27, 2003	Kitt Peak	Spacewatch	·	1.1 km	MPC · JPL
487896	2015 TT_{161}	—	May 30, 2008	Mount Lemmon	Mount Lemmon Survey	·	690 m	MPC · JPL
487897	2015 TH_{166}	—	August 24, 1998	Socorro	LINEAR	·	770 m	MPC · JPL
487898	2015 TV_{167}	—	October 2, 2006	Mount Lemmon	Mount Lemmon Survey	·	2.1 km	MPC · JPL
487899	2015 TT_{170}	—	February 8, 2008	Mount Lemmon	Mount Lemmon Survey	·	1.5 km	MPC · JPL
487900	2015 TW_{170}	—	March 8, 2013	Haleakala	Pan-STARRS 1	·	1.6 km	MPC · JPL

== 487901–488000 ==
back to top

Designation			Discovery			Properties		Ref
Permanent	Provisional	Named after	Date	Site	Discoverer(s)	Category	Diam.	Ref
487901	2015 TU_{174}	—	March 13, 2007	Mount Lemmon	Mount Lemmon Survey	·	2.7 km	MPC · JPL
487902	2015 TF_{177}	—	May 8, 2013	Haleakala	Pan-STARRS 1	TEL	1.1 km	MPC · JPL
487903	2015 TV_{177}	—	October 2, 2006	Mount Lemmon	Mount Lemmon Survey	·	1.8 km	MPC · JPL
487904	2015 TA_{180}	—	April 15, 2013	Haleakala	Pan-STARRS 1	·	2.6 km	MPC · JPL
487905	2015 TC_{180}	—	July 27, 2014	Haleakala	Pan-STARRS 1	·	2.3 km	MPC · JPL
487906	2015 TB_{183}	—	February 9, 2008	Mount Lemmon	Mount Lemmon Survey	WIT	910 m	MPC · JPL
487907	2015 TE_{183}	—	December 4, 2007	Catalina	CSS	(5)	1.1 km	MPC · JPL
487908	2015 TJ_{183}	—	May 13, 2009	Mount Lemmon	Mount Lemmon Survey	·	1.6 km	MPC · JPL
487909	2015 TM_{183}	—	September 14, 2006	Kitt Peak	Spacewatch	·	2.8 km	MPC · JPL
487910	2015 TX_{183}	—	June 27, 2014	Haleakala	Pan-STARRS 1	EOS	2.0 km	MPC · JPL
487911	2015 TR_{184}	—	November 8, 2010	Mount Lemmon	Mount Lemmon Survey	EOS	1.8 km	MPC · JPL
487912	2015 TC_{192}	—	November 24, 2011	Haleakala	Pan-STARRS 1	·	1.4 km	MPC · JPL
487913	2015 TY_{193}	—	August 8, 2004	Socorro	LINEAR	·	1.1 km	MPC · JPL
487914	2015 TJ_{194}	—	September 16, 2006	Catalina	CSS	·	1.8 km	MPC · JPL
487915	2015 TZ_{194}	—	February 26, 2008	Mount Lemmon	Mount Lemmon Survey	GEF	1.2 km	MPC · JPL
487916	2015 TX_{195}	—	December 24, 2005	Socorro	LINEAR	·	2.7 km	MPC · JPL
487917	2015 TB_{196}	—	August 16, 2009	La Sagra	OAM	·	3.1 km	MPC · JPL
487918	2015 TG_{197}	—	August 5, 2010	WISE	WISE	·	2.5 km	MPC · JPL
487919	2015 TL_{200}	—	September 25, 2007	Mount Lemmon	Mount Lemmon Survey	MAR	830 m	MPC · JPL
487920	2015 TZ_{200}	—	November 2, 2007	Kitt Peak	Spacewatch	KON	2.2 km	MPC · JPL
487921	2015 TM_{203}	—	August 29, 2009	Kitt Peak	Spacewatch	·	3.3 km	MPC · JPL
487922	2015 TU_{203}	—	January 4, 2006	Mount Lemmon	Mount Lemmon Survey	·	2.3 km	MPC · JPL
487923	2015 TF_{204}	—	May 22, 2011	Mount Lemmon	Mount Lemmon Survey	·	620 m	MPC · JPL
487924	2015 TN_{206}	—	April 25, 2007	Kitt Peak	Spacewatch	·	4.2 km	MPC · JPL
487925	2015 TO_{206}	—	September 24, 2008	Mount Lemmon	Mount Lemmon Survey	·	1.1 km	MPC · JPL
487926	2015 TV_{206}	—	December 31, 2007	Mount Lemmon	Mount Lemmon Survey	·	1.6 km	MPC · JPL
487927	2015 TZ_{206}	—	July 28, 2014	Haleakala	Pan-STARRS 1	VER	1.8 km	MPC · JPL
487928	2015 TG_{207}	—	October 10, 2007	Mount Lemmon	Mount Lemmon Survey	·	1.3 km	MPC · JPL
487929	2015 TB_{208}	—	September 3, 2010	Socorro	LINEAR	GEF	1.3 km	MPC · JPL
487930	2015 TJ_{209}	—	November 11, 2006	Mount Lemmon	Mount Lemmon Survey	·	2.9 km	MPC · JPL
487931	2015 TR_{209}	—	September 21, 1998	Kitt Peak	Spacewatch	·	1.2 km	MPC · JPL
487932	2015 TA_{210}	—	February 26, 2012	Haleakala	Pan-STARRS 1	EOS	2.2 km	MPC · JPL
487933	2015 TP_{213}	—	March 12, 2007	Kitt Peak	Spacewatch	·	650 m	MPC · JPL
487934	2015 TH_{217}	—	September 28, 2011	Mount Lemmon	Mount Lemmon Survey	·	930 m	MPC · JPL
487935	2015 TB_{219}	—	October 26, 2011	Haleakala	Pan-STARRS 1	·	1.6 km	MPC · JPL
487936	2015 TE_{220}	—	October 25, 2011	Haleakala	Pan-STARRS 1	·	1.6 km	MPC · JPL
487937	2015 TG_{220}	—	December 28, 2003	Socorro	LINEAR	·	1.1 km	MPC · JPL
487938	2015 TU_{220}	—	September 30, 2006	Mount Lemmon	Mount Lemmon Survey	WIT	980 m	MPC · JPL
487939	2015 TO_{223}	—	July 29, 2006	Siding Spring	SSS	JUN	1 km	MPC · JPL
487940	2015 TC_{231}	—	February 3, 2009	Kitt Peak	Spacewatch	·	1.5 km	MPC · JPL
487941	2015 TK_{231}	—	August 18, 2006	Kitt Peak	Spacewatch	·	1.7 km	MPC · JPL
487942	2015 TP_{232}	—	December 16, 2011	Haleakala	Pan-STARRS 1	MAR	1.1 km	MPC · JPL
487943	2015 TS_{234}	—	May 29, 2009	Kitt Peak	Spacewatch	·	1.9 km	MPC · JPL
487944	2015 TB_{235}	—	November 10, 2004	Kitt Peak	Spacewatch	HYG	3.3 km	MPC · JPL
487945	2015 TM_{235}	—	March 12, 2008	Kitt Peak	Spacewatch	HOF	2.6 km	MPC · JPL
487946	2015 TB_{239}	—	June 19, 2009	Kitt Peak	Spacewatch	·	4.2 km	MPC · JPL
487947	2015 TN_{241}	—	March 3, 2006	Kitt Peak	Spacewatch	·	1.2 km	MPC · JPL
487948	2015 TP_{242}	—	November 2, 2011	Mount Lemmon	Mount Lemmon Survey	·	1.3 km	MPC · JPL
487949	2015 TB_{243}	—	September 27, 2011	Mount Lemmon	Mount Lemmon Survey	·	1.3 km	MPC · JPL
487950	2015 TK_{246}	—	December 27, 2005	Mount Lemmon	Mount Lemmon Survey	·	1.7 km	MPC · JPL
487951	2015 TN_{251}	—	September 21, 2001	Kitt Peak	Spacewatch	HOF	2.9 km	MPC · JPL
487952	2015 TH_{252}	—	December 15, 2006	Kitt Peak	Spacewatch	·	1.7 km	MPC · JPL
487953	2015 TT_{255}	—	January 8, 2011	Mount Lemmon	Mount Lemmon Survey	·	3.1 km	MPC · JPL
487954	2015 TA_{260}	—	February 26, 2012	Kitt Peak	Spacewatch	·	2.9 km	MPC · JPL
487955	2015 TW_{263}	—	October 20, 2007	Mount Lemmon	Mount Lemmon Survey	·	1.0 km	MPC · JPL
487956	2015 TG_{265}	—	October 21, 2006	Kitt Peak	Spacewatch	·	2.0 km	MPC · JPL
487957	2015 TL_{265}	—	October 13, 2007	Catalina	CSS	·	1.5 km	MPC · JPL
487958	2015 TS_{281}	—	January 17, 2007	Kitt Peak	Spacewatch	·	570 m	MPC · JPL
487959	2015 TH_{282}	—	March 12, 2007	Kitt Peak	Spacewatch	EMA	2.7 km	MPC · JPL
487960	2015 TD_{288}	—	September 17, 2006	Catalina	CSS	·	2.0 km	MPC · JPL
487961	2015 TW_{290}	—	October 23, 2011	Haleakala	Pan-STARRS 1	·	1.6 km	MPC · JPL
487962	2015 TH_{296}	—	March 27, 2008	Mount Lemmon	Mount Lemmon Survey	·	1.6 km	MPC · JPL
487963	2015 TR_{297}	—	April 1, 2014	Mount Lemmon	Mount Lemmon Survey	·	620 m	MPC · JPL
487964	2015 TC_{298}	—	December 11, 2004	Kitt Peak	Spacewatch	·	3.2 km	MPC · JPL
487965	2015 TL_{298}	—	November 18, 2011	Catalina	CSS	·	1.6 km	MPC · JPL
487966	2015 TV_{298}	—	September 13, 2009	La Sagra	OAM	·	3.7 km	MPC · JPL
487967	2015 TJ_{300}	—	September 29, 2011	Mount Lemmon	Mount Lemmon Survey	SUL	2.0 km	MPC · JPL
487968	2015 TW_{300}	—	October 5, 2003	Kitt Peak	Spacewatch	·	1.3 km	MPC · JPL
487969	2015 TA_{301}	—	October 19, 2001	Kitt Peak	Spacewatch	NYS	920 m	MPC · JPL
487970	2015 TB_{301}	—	December 17, 2001	Socorro	LINEAR	·	840 m	MPC · JPL
487971	2015 TW_{303}	—	April 16, 2013	Haleakala	Pan-STARRS 1	·	2.1 km	MPC · JPL
487972	2015 TA_{304}	—	October 9, 2015	Haleakala	Pan-STARRS 1	·	3.5 km	MPC · JPL
487973	2015 TE_{305}	—	February 25, 2007	Kitt Peak	Spacewatch	EOS	1.5 km	MPC · JPL
487974	2015 TY_{305}	—	April 29, 2006	Kitt Peak	Spacewatch	·	1.2 km	MPC · JPL
487975	2015 TE_{307}	—	May 12, 2013	Haleakala	Pan-STARRS 1	·	3.1 km	MPC · JPL
487976	2015 TN_{307}	—	November 24, 2011	Catalina	CSS	EUN	1.1 km	MPC · JPL
487977	2015 TE_{308}	—	May 6, 2014	Haleakala	Pan-STARRS 1	·	2.0 km	MPC · JPL
487978	2015 TL_{310}	—	November 5, 2010	Mount Lemmon	Mount Lemmon Survey	·	3.2 km	MPC · JPL
487979	2015 TT_{312}	—	February 4, 2005	Kitt Peak	Spacewatch	NYS	1.1 km	MPC · JPL
487980	2015 TP_{314}	—	October 9, 2007	Kitt Peak	Spacewatch	·	1.2 km	MPC · JPL
487981	2015 TQ_{319}	—	December 25, 2005	Mount Lemmon	Mount Lemmon Survey	THM	1.6 km	MPC · JPL
487982	2015 TS_{319}	—	November 9, 1999	Kitt Peak	Spacewatch	·	1.7 km	MPC · JPL
487983	2015 TZ_{319}	—	March 17, 2007	Kitt Peak	Spacewatch	·	2.7 km	MPC · JPL
487984	2015 TZ_{321}	—	December 10, 2010	Kitt Peak	Spacewatch	·	3.5 km	MPC · JPL
487985	2015 TO_{322}	—	January 20, 2008	Kitt Peak	Spacewatch	·	1.7 km	MPC · JPL
487986	2015 TP_{323}	—	July 29, 2014	Haleakala	Pan-STARRS 1	EOS	1.9 km	MPC · JPL
487987	2015 TH_{326}	—	September 25, 2006	Anderson Mesa	LONEOS	·	2.2 km	MPC · JPL
487988	2015 TO_{326}	—	November 5, 2010	Mount Lemmon	Mount Lemmon Survey	LIX	4.3 km	MPC · JPL
487989	2015 TF_{329}	—	September 26, 2006	Catalina	CSS	·	1.8 km	MPC · JPL
487990	2015 TZ_{329}	—	June 5, 2011	Mount Lemmon	Mount Lemmon Survey	·	960 m	MPC · JPL
487991	2015 TY_{331}	—	October 26, 2011	Haleakala	Pan-STARRS 1	MAR	1 km	MPC · JPL
487992	2015 TL_{332}	—	April 15, 2007	Catalina	CSS	(1118)	3.8 km	MPC · JPL
487993	2015 TE_{335}	—	March 29, 2012	Haleakala	Pan-STARRS 1	·	2.6 km	MPC · JPL
487994	2015 TU_{336}	—	February 21, 2006	Catalina	CSS	·	2.6 km	MPC · JPL
487995	2015 TA_{337}	—	September 21, 2004	Socorro	LINEAR	·	2.6 km	MPC · JPL
487996	2015 TW_{341}	—	December 11, 2001	Socorro	LINEAR	·	1.9 km	MPC · JPL
487997	2015 TK_{344}	—	October 26, 2011	Haleakala	Pan-STARRS 1	·	1.4 km	MPC · JPL
487998	2015 TD_{345}	—	September 28, 2006	Kitt Peak	Spacewatch	·	1.8 km	MPC · JPL
487999	2015 TH_{345}	—	December 1, 2005	Kitt Peak	Spacewatch	·	1.6 km	MPC · JPL
488000	2015 TK_{345}	—	September 30, 2006	Mount Lemmon	Mount Lemmon Survey	·	1.3 km	MPC · JPL

back to top

== Meaning of names ==
As minor planet discoveries are confirmed, they are given a permanent number by the IAU's Minor Planet Center (MPC), and the discoverers can then submit names for them, following the IAU's naming conventions. The list below concerns those minor planets in the specified number-range that have received names, and explains the meanings of those names.

Official naming citations of newly named small Solar System bodies are approved and published in a bulletin by IAU's Working Group for Small Bodies Nomenclature (WGSBN). Before May 2021, citations were published in MPC's Minor Planet Circulars for many decades. Recent citations can also be found on the JPL Small-Body Database (SBDB). Until his death in 2016, German astronomer Lutz D. Schmadel compiled these citations into the Dictionary of Minor Planet Names (DMP) and regularly updated the collection.

Based on Paul Herget's The Names of the Minor Planets, Schmadel also researched the unclear origin of numerous asteroids, most of which had been named prior to World War II. This article incorporates text from this source, which is in the public domain: SBDB New namings may only be added to this list below after official publication as the preannouncement of names is condemned. The WGSBN publishes a comprehensive guideline for the naming rules of non-cometary small Solar System bodies.

Named minor planet	Provisional	This minor planet was named for...	Ref · Catalog
487617 Ingethiering	2015 MB_{80}	Inge Thiering (born 1962) is a high school teacher in Neckargemuend, Germany, who for many years has undertaken astronomical research programs with her students, including successful asteroid searches.	JPL · 487617
487761 Frankbrandner	2015 RX_{194}	Frank Brandner (1961–2014) was an inspiring teacher and photographer at the Otto-Schott-Gymnasium in Jena, Germany, who encouraged his students to excel in astronomy, including the discovery of minor planets.	JPL · 487761
487884 Saoras	2015 TS_{142}	The Special Astrophysical Observatory (SAO) of the Russian Academy of Sciences (RAS) is located at Nizhnij Arkhyz.	IAU · 487884
