= List of minor planets: 484001–485000 =

The following is a partial list of minor planets, running from minor-planet number 484001 through 485000, inclusive. The primary data for this and other partial lists is based on JPL's "Small-Body Orbital Elements" and data available from the Minor Planet Center. Critical list information is also provided by the MPC, unless otherwise specified from Lowell Observatory. A detailed description of the table's columns and additional sources are given on the main page including a complete list of every page in this series, and a statistical break-up on the dynamical classification of minor planets.

Also see the summary list of all named bodies in numerical and alphabetical order, and the corresponding naming citations for the number range of this particular list. New namings may only be added to this list after official publication, as the preannouncement of names is condemned by the Working Group for Small Bodies Nomenclature of the International Astronomical Union.

Near-Earth obj.	MBA (inner)	MBA (outer)	Centaur
Mars-crosser	MBA (middle)	Jupiter trojan	Trans-Neptunian obj.
Unclassified

== 484001–484100 ==
Designation			Discovery			Properties		Ref
Permanent	Provisional	Named after	Date	Site	Discoverer(s)	Category	Diam.	Ref
484001	2006 DD_{3}	—	January 30, 2006	Kitt Peak	Spacewatch	·	980 m	MPC · JPL
484002	2006 DD_{5}	—	February 20, 2006	Kitt Peak	Spacewatch	·	2.1 km	MPC · JPL
484003	2006 DS_{11}	—	December 25, 2005	Mount Lemmon	Mount Lemmon Survey	·	1.9 km	MPC · JPL
484004	2006 DW_{19}	—	January 23, 2006	Kitt Peak	Spacewatch	·	790 m	MPC · JPL
484005	2006 DW_{25}	—	February 20, 2006	Kitt Peak	Spacewatch	ERI	1.5 km	MPC · JPL
484006	2006 DU_{28}	—	February 20, 2006	Kitt Peak	Spacewatch	·	2.5 km	MPC · JPL
484007	2006 DW_{37}	—	February 20, 2006	Mount Lemmon	Mount Lemmon Survey	THB	2.7 km	MPC · JPL
484008	2006 DG_{38}	—	February 2, 2006	Kitt Peak	Spacewatch	·	2.6 km	MPC · JPL
484009	2006 DY_{44}	—	February 20, 2006	Kitt Peak	Spacewatch	·	2.3 km	MPC · JPL
484010	2006 DQ_{48}	—	February 6, 2006	Catalina	CSS	·	3.5 km	MPC · JPL
484011	2006 DB_{49}	—	January 26, 2006	Kitt Peak	Spacewatch	·	2.5 km	MPC · JPL
484012	2006 DL_{52}	—	January 7, 2006	Mount Lemmon	Mount Lemmon Survey	VER	2.5 km	MPC · JPL
484013	2006 DU_{58}	—	February 24, 2006	Kitt Peak	Spacewatch	·	890 m	MPC · JPL
484014	2006 DU_{65}	—	January 31, 2006	Catalina	CSS	H	610 m	MPC · JPL
484015	2006 DN_{75}	—	January 23, 2006	Kitt Peak	Spacewatch	·	2.4 km	MPC · JPL
484016	2006 DK_{103}	—	January 26, 2006	Mount Lemmon	Mount Lemmon Survey	·	2.0 km	MPC · JPL
484017	2006 DA_{106}	—	February 25, 2006	Mount Lemmon	Mount Lemmon Survey	·	1.2 km	MPC · JPL
484018	2006 DN_{107}	—	February 25, 2006	Kitt Peak	Spacewatch	·	1.0 km	MPC · JPL
484019	2006 DF_{108}	—	February 25, 2006	Kitt Peak	Spacewatch	·	2.9 km	MPC · JPL
484020	2006 DF_{118}	—	February 27, 2006	Kitt Peak	Spacewatch	·	980 m	MPC · JPL
484021	2006 DL_{129}	—	February 25, 2006	Kitt Peak	Spacewatch	NYS	1.1 km	MPC · JPL
484022	2006 DD_{131}	—	February 25, 2006	Kitt Peak	Spacewatch	EOS	1.8 km	MPC · JPL
484023	2006 DE_{140}	—	February 25, 2006	Kitt Peak	Spacewatch	LIX	3.0 km	MPC · JPL
484024	2006 DA_{143}	—	February 25, 2006	Kitt Peak	Spacewatch	CLA	1.3 km	MPC · JPL
484025	2006 DH_{145}	—	February 25, 2006	Mount Lemmon	Mount Lemmon Survey	·	2.4 km	MPC · JPL
484026	2006 DL_{164}	—	February 27, 2006	Kitt Peak	Spacewatch	·	2.4 km	MPC · JPL
484027	2006 DX_{175}	—	January 26, 2006	Mount Lemmon	Mount Lemmon Survey	·	2.8 km	MPC · JPL
484028	2006 DB_{176}	—	February 27, 2006	Mount Lemmon	Mount Lemmon Survey	MAS	590 m	MPC · JPL
484029	2006 DR_{196}	—	January 31, 2006	Kitt Peak	Spacewatch	·	3.2 km	MPC · JPL
484030	2006 DO_{197}	—	December 5, 2005	Kitt Peak	Spacewatch	T_{j} (2.96)	3.0 km	MPC · JPL
484031	2006 DE_{202}	—	February 1, 2006	Kitt Peak	Spacewatch	·	3.4 km	MPC · JPL
484032	2006 DE_{206}	—	January 26, 2006	Mount Lemmon	Mount Lemmon Survey	V	620 m	MPC · JPL
484033	2006 DU_{206}	—	February 25, 2006	Mount Lemmon	Mount Lemmon Survey	NYS	920 m	MPC · JPL
484034	2006 DG_{209}	—	February 27, 2006	Kitt Peak	Spacewatch	·	2.2 km	MPC · JPL
484035	2006 DA_{218}	—	February 25, 2006	Kitt Peak	Spacewatch	·	2.3 km	MPC · JPL
484036	2006 DB_{218}	—	February 27, 2006	Kitt Peak	Spacewatch	VER	2.2 km	MPC · JPL
484037	2006 EJ_{5}	—	March 2, 2006	Kitt Peak	Spacewatch	·	1.2 km	MPC · JPL
484038	2006 EN_{24}	—	March 3, 2006	Kitt Peak	Spacewatch	·	2.3 km	MPC · JPL
484039	2006 EC_{26}	—	January 26, 2006	Kitt Peak	Spacewatch	L5	8.2 km	MPC · JPL
484040	2006 EE_{27}	—	February 2, 2006	Kitt Peak	Spacewatch	·	2.7 km	MPC · JPL
484041	2006 EQ_{33}	—	March 3, 2006	Catalina	CSS	·	2.6 km	MPC · JPL
484042	2006 EB_{37}	—	March 3, 2006	Mount Lemmon	Mount Lemmon Survey	THM	1.9 km	MPC · JPL
484043	2006 EV_{46}	—	March 4, 2006	Kitt Peak	Spacewatch	L5	10 km	MPC · JPL
484044	2006 EP_{55}	—	February 2, 2006	Kitt Peak	Spacewatch	·	2.2 km	MPC · JPL
484045	2006 ES_{65}	—	February 25, 2006	Mount Lemmon	Mount Lemmon Survey	·	1.0 km	MPC · JPL
484046	2006 FJ_{20}	—	March 23, 2006	Mount Lemmon	Mount Lemmon Survey	·	4.5 km	MPC · JPL
484047	2006 FL_{41}	—	March 26, 2006	Mount Lemmon	Mount Lemmon Survey	·	860 m	MPC · JPL
484048	2006 FR_{44}	—	March 24, 2006	Anderson Mesa	LONEOS	·	1.9 km	MPC · JPL
484049	2006 FQ_{54}	—	March 26, 2006	Kitt Peak	Spacewatch	MAS	700 m	MPC · JPL
484050	2006 FU_{54}	—	March 23, 2006	Kitt Peak	Spacewatch	MAS	720 m	MPC · JPL
484051	2006 GF_{6}	—	April 2, 2006	Kitt Peak	Spacewatch	·	4.6 km	MPC · JPL
484052	2006 GM_{24}	—	April 2, 2006	Kitt Peak	Spacewatch	MAS	720 m	MPC · JPL
484053	2006 GH_{34}	—	April 7, 2006	Catalina	CSS	·	2.9 km	MPC · JPL
484054	2006 GG_{35}	—	February 2, 2006	Mount Lemmon	Mount Lemmon Survey	·	3.3 km	MPC · JPL
484055	2006 GG_{45}	—	April 7, 2006	Mount Lemmon	Mount Lemmon Survey	·	3.0 km	MPC · JPL
484056	2006 GH_{48}	—	March 23, 2006	Mount Lemmon	Mount Lemmon Survey	·	1.1 km	MPC · JPL
484057	2006 GK_{48}	—	April 9, 2006	Kitt Peak	Spacewatch	MAS	660 m	MPC · JPL
484058	2006 GT_{54}	—	April 2, 2006	Kitt Peak	Spacewatch	·	1.1 km	MPC · JPL
484059	2006 GV_{54}	—	April 8, 2006	Kitt Peak	Spacewatch	NYS	1.1 km	MPC · JPL
484060	2006 HZ	—	April 18, 2006	Anderson Mesa	LONEOS	·	1.0 km	MPC · JPL
484061	2006 HX_{8}	—	April 19, 2006	Kitt Peak	Spacewatch	PHO	970 m	MPC · JPL
484062	2006 HZ_{14}	—	April 19, 2006	Mount Lemmon	Mount Lemmon Survey	LIX	3.5 km	MPC · JPL
484063	2006 HV_{44}	—	March 24, 2006	Kitt Peak	Spacewatch	T_{j} (2.98)	4.1 km	MPC · JPL
484064	2006 HG_{48}	—	April 24, 2006	Kitt Peak	Spacewatch	·	2.6 km	MPC · JPL
484065	2006 HL_{54}	—	March 2, 2006	Mount Lemmon	Mount Lemmon Survey	·	3.1 km	MPC · JPL
484066	2006 HU_{114}	—	April 26, 2006	Kitt Peak	Spacewatch	MAS	670 m	MPC · JPL
484067	2006 HH_{154}	—	April 29, 2006	Kitt Peak	Spacewatch	·	1.1 km	MPC · JPL
484068	2006 JE_{8}	—	April 19, 2006	Mount Lemmon	Mount Lemmon Survey	·	1.2 km	MPC · JPL
484069	2006 JV_{9}	—	May 1, 2006	Kitt Peak	Spacewatch	THM	2.1 km	MPC · JPL
484070	2006 JT_{27}	—	April 8, 2006	Kitt Peak	Spacewatch	·	930 m	MPC · JPL
484071	2006 JQ_{81}	—	May 6, 2006	Mount Lemmon	Mount Lemmon Survey	NYS	1.1 km	MPC · JPL
484072	2006 KY_{12}	—	May 20, 2006	Kitt Peak	Spacewatch	·	2.8 km	MPC · JPL
484073	2006 KM_{20}	—	May 20, 2006	Anderson Mesa	LONEOS	·	1.4 km	MPC · JPL
484074	2006 KN_{38}	—	May 21, 2006	Anderson Mesa	LONEOS	T_{j} (2.96)	2.9 km	MPC · JPL
484075	2006 KX_{43}	—	May 8, 2006	Mount Lemmon	Mount Lemmon Survey	·	4.0 km	MPC · JPL
484076	2006 KW_{47}	—	May 8, 2006	Kitt Peak	Spacewatch	NYS	1.1 km	MPC · JPL
484077	2006 KD_{76}	—	May 24, 2006	Catalina	CSS	·	4.0 km	MPC · JPL
484078	2006 KO_{77}	—	May 24, 2006	Mount Lemmon	Mount Lemmon Survey	·	2.4 km	MPC · JPL
484079	2006 KS_{83}	—	May 21, 2006	Kitt Peak	Spacewatch	·	2.9 km	MPC · JPL
484080	2006 KO_{107}	—	April 7, 2006	Kitt Peak	Spacewatch	·	1.1 km	MPC · JPL
484081	2006 OW_{4}	—	July 21, 2006	Catalina	CSS	·	1.5 km	MPC · JPL
484082	2006 PY_{15}	—	August 15, 2006	Palomar	NEAT	·	1.8 km	MPC · JPL
484083	2006 PL_{21}	—	August 15, 2006	Palomar	NEAT	·	2.1 km	MPC · JPL
484084	2006 QS_{5}	—	August 16, 2006	Siding Spring	SSS	·	2.2 km	MPC · JPL
484085	2006 QT_{5}	—	August 18, 2006	Reedy Creek	J. Broughton	·	2.5 km	MPC · JPL
484086	2006 QB_{7}	—	August 17, 2006	Palomar	NEAT	EUN	1.2 km	MPC · JPL
484087	2006 QY_{33}	—	August 18, 2006	Anderson Mesa	LONEOS	·	1.7 km	MPC · JPL
484088	2006 QO_{45}	—	August 19, 2006	Kitt Peak	Spacewatch	·	1.7 km	MPC · JPL
484089	2006 QZ_{47}	—	August 21, 2006	Palomar	NEAT	·	1.6 km	MPC · JPL
484090	2006 QF_{70}	—	August 21, 2006	Kitt Peak	Spacewatch	·	1.6 km	MPC · JPL
484091	2006 QB_{115}	—	August 27, 2006	Anderson Mesa	LONEOS	·	1.7 km	MPC · JPL
484092	2006 QB_{164}	—	August 29, 2006	Catalina	CSS	·	1.9 km	MPC · JPL
484093	2006 RA_{2}	—	August 30, 2006	Anderson Mesa	LONEOS	·	2.3 km	MPC · JPL
484094	2006 RT_{11}	—	August 29, 2006	Catalina	CSS	·	1.6 km	MPC · JPL
484095	2006 RU_{20}	—	September 15, 2006	Socorro	LINEAR	·	1.6 km	MPC · JPL
484096	2006 RE_{36}	—	September 14, 2006	Catalina	CSS	·	670 m	MPC · JPL
484097	2006 RL_{54}	—	September 14, 2006	Kitt Peak	Spacewatch	EUN	1.1 km	MPC · JPL
484098	2006 RL_{59}	—	September 15, 2006	Kitt Peak	Spacewatch	·	1.6 km	MPC · JPL
484099	2006 RR_{80}	—	September 15, 2006	Kitt Peak	Spacewatch	·	1.7 km	MPC · JPL
484100	2006 RM_{82}	—	September 15, 2006	Kitt Peak	Spacewatch	NEM	1.7 km	MPC · JPL

== 484101–484200 ==
back to top

Designation			Discovery			Properties		Ref
Permanent	Provisional	Named after	Date	Site	Discoverer(s)	Category	Diam.	Ref
484101	2006 RH_{84}	—	September 15, 2006	Kitt Peak	Spacewatch	·	1.4 km	MPC · JPL
484102	2006 RD_{88}	—	September 15, 2006	Kitt Peak	Spacewatch	EUN	1.2 km	MPC · JPL
484103	2006 RM_{93}	—	July 21, 2006	Mount Lemmon	Mount Lemmon Survey	·	1.9 km	MPC · JPL
484104	2006 RJ_{115}	—	September 14, 2006	Mauna Kea	Masiero, J.	·	1.5 km	MPC · JPL
484105	2006 RL_{122}	—	August 28, 2006	Kitt Peak	Spacewatch	·	1.2 km	MPC · JPL
484106	2006 SC_{3}	—	September 16, 2006	Catalina	CSS	·	1.6 km	MPC · JPL
484107	2006 SK_{11}	—	September 16, 2006	Socorro	LINEAR	·	1.9 km	MPC · JPL
484108	2006 SK_{25}	—	August 18, 2006	Kitt Peak	Spacewatch	·	1.5 km	MPC · JPL
484109	2006 SX_{39}	—	August 18, 2006	Kitt Peak	Spacewatch	·	1.5 km	MPC · JPL
484110	2006 SE_{40}	—	August 27, 2006	Kitt Peak	Spacewatch	·	1.7 km	MPC · JPL
484111	2006 SU_{41}	—	September 18, 2006	Anderson Mesa	LONEOS	·	1.4 km	MPC · JPL
484112	2006 SM_{120}	—	September 18, 2006	Catalina	CSS	·	1.8 km	MPC · JPL
484113	2006 SS_{145}	—	September 19, 2006	Kitt Peak	Spacewatch	·	1.7 km	MPC · JPL
484114	2006 SU_{149}	—	September 19, 2006	Kitt Peak	Spacewatch	·	2.0 km	MPC · JPL
484115	2006 SY_{151}	—	September 19, 2006	Kitt Peak	Spacewatch	·	1.3 km	MPC · JPL
484116	2006 SL_{157}	—	September 15, 2006	Kitt Peak	Spacewatch	·	1.7 km	MPC · JPL
484117	2006 SS_{206}	—	September 25, 2006	Mount Lemmon	Mount Lemmon Survey	·	1.4 km	MPC · JPL
484118	2006 SV_{206}	—	September 18, 2006	Kitt Peak	Spacewatch	·	1.4 km	MPC · JPL
484119	2006 SA_{228}	—	September 26, 2006	Kitt Peak	Spacewatch	·	1.3 km	MPC · JPL
484120	2006 SN_{249}	—	September 15, 2006	Kitt Peak	Spacewatch	JUN	1.1 km	MPC · JPL
484121	2006 SN_{250}	—	September 19, 2006	Kitt Peak	Spacewatch	·	1.3 km	MPC · JPL
484122	2006 SJ_{260}	—	September 15, 2006	Kitt Peak	Spacewatch	·	1.5 km	MPC · JPL
484123	2006 SW_{264}	—	September 26, 2006	Kitt Peak	Spacewatch	·	1.5 km	MPC · JPL
484124	2006 SR_{267}	—	September 26, 2006	Kitt Peak	Spacewatch	·	1.8 km	MPC · JPL
484125	2006 SJ_{286}	—	September 19, 2006	Catalina	CSS	·	1.6 km	MPC · JPL
484126	2006 SM_{292}	—	September 17, 2006	Catalina	CSS	·	1.5 km	MPC · JPL
484127	2006 SV_{292}	—	September 25, 2006	Kitt Peak	Spacewatch	·	1.3 km	MPC · JPL
484128	2006 SB_{297}	—	September 14, 2006	Kitt Peak	Spacewatch	·	1.4 km	MPC · JPL
484129	2006 SU_{310}	—	September 27, 2006	Kitt Peak	Spacewatch	MRX	880 m	MPC · JPL
484130	2006 SZ_{316}	—	September 27, 2006	Kitt Peak	Spacewatch	·	2.1 km	MPC · JPL
484131	2006 SB_{318}	—	September 27, 2006	Kitt Peak	Spacewatch	·	850 m	MPC · JPL
484132	2006 SS_{328}	—	September 19, 2006	Kitt Peak	Spacewatch	·	1.4 km	MPC · JPL
484133	2006 SB_{347}	—	September 15, 2006	Kitt Peak	Spacewatch	MRX	790 m	MPC · JPL
484134	2006 SP_{353}	—	September 30, 2006	Catalina	CSS	·	1.5 km	MPC · JPL
484135	2006 SB_{379}	—	September 18, 2006	Apache Point	SDSS Collaboration	MAR	920 m	MPC · JPL
484136	2006 SR_{396}	—	September 18, 2006	Kitt Peak	Spacewatch	·	1.5 km	MPC · JPL
484137	2006 SE_{398}	—	September 28, 2006	Mount Lemmon	Mount Lemmon Survey	·	2.0 km	MPC · JPL
484138	2006 SM_{401}	—	September 28, 2006	Mount Lemmon	Mount Lemmon Survey	MRX	760 m	MPC · JPL
484139	2006 SO_{408}	—	September 30, 2006	Mount Lemmon	Mount Lemmon Survey	·	1.6 km	MPC · JPL
484140	2006 TO_{5}	—	October 2, 2006	Mount Lemmon	Mount Lemmon Survey	·	570 m	MPC · JPL
484141	2006 TP_{15}	—	September 24, 2006	Kitt Peak	Spacewatch	·	1.6 km	MPC · JPL
484142	2006 TH_{23}	—	September 30, 2006	Mount Lemmon	Mount Lemmon Survey	·	2.1 km	MPC · JPL
484143	2006 TY_{29}	—	September 25, 2006	Mount Lemmon	Mount Lemmon Survey	·	710 m	MPC · JPL
484144	2006 TJ_{41}	—	October 12, 2006	Kitt Peak	Spacewatch	·	1.6 km	MPC · JPL
484145	2006 TC_{42}	—	September 25, 2006	Mount Lemmon	Mount Lemmon Survey	·	1.6 km	MPC · JPL
484146	2006 TL_{59}	—	October 4, 2006	Mount Lemmon	Mount Lemmon Survey	DOR	1.8 km	MPC · JPL
484147	2006 TS_{73}	—	October 11, 2006	Kitt Peak	Spacewatch	·	1.6 km	MPC · JPL
484148	2006 TP_{75}	—	September 30, 2006	Catalina	CSS	·	2.0 km	MPC · JPL
484149	2006 TW_{85}	—	October 4, 2006	Mount Lemmon	Mount Lemmon Survey	DOR	1.9 km	MPC · JPL
484150	2006 TU_{95}	—	October 12, 2006	Kitt Peak	Spacewatch	AGN	950 m	MPC · JPL
484151	2006 TK_{100}	—	October 2, 2006	Mount Lemmon	Mount Lemmon Survey	·	1.6 km	MPC · JPL
484152	2006 TN_{125}	—	October 13, 2006	Kitt Peak	Spacewatch	·	1.4 km	MPC · JPL
484153	2006 UO_{2}	—	October 16, 2006	Kitt Peak	Spacewatch	·	1.6 km	MPC · JPL
484154	2006 UA_{12}	—	October 2, 2006	Mount Lemmon	Mount Lemmon Survey	·	1.9 km	MPC · JPL
484155	2006 UT_{26}	—	September 25, 2006	Mount Lemmon	Mount Lemmon Survey	·	1.7 km	MPC · JPL
484156	2006 UZ_{26}	—	October 16, 2006	Kitt Peak	Spacewatch	·	2.3 km	MPC · JPL
484157	2006 UK_{30}	—	October 16, 2006	Kitt Peak	Spacewatch	GEF	920 m	MPC · JPL
484158	2006 UX_{34}	—	September 30, 2006	Mount Lemmon	Mount Lemmon Survey	·	2.6 km	MPC · JPL
484159	2006 UC_{39}	—	September 25, 2006	Mount Lemmon	Mount Lemmon Survey	HOF	2.4 km	MPC · JPL
484160	2006 UV_{46}	—	October 16, 2006	Kitt Peak	Spacewatch	·	1.5 km	MPC · JPL
484161	2006 UV_{63}	—	October 23, 2006	Eskridge	Farpoint	·	1.6 km	MPC · JPL
484162	2006 UF_{65}	—	August 27, 2006	Kitt Peak	Spacewatch	·	1.8 km	MPC · JPL
484163	2006 UP_{107}	—	October 3, 2006	Mount Lemmon	Mount Lemmon Survey	·	1.4 km	MPC · JPL
484164	2006 UX_{132}	—	October 19, 2006	Kitt Peak	Spacewatch	·	1.6 km	MPC · JPL
484165	2006 US_{136}	—	October 4, 2006	Mount Lemmon	Mount Lemmon Survey	·	1.9 km	MPC · JPL
484166	2006 UJ_{140}	—	October 19, 2006	Kitt Peak	Spacewatch	·	1.6 km	MPC · JPL
484167	2006 UV_{143}	—	October 19, 2006	Palomar	NEAT	JUN	1.2 km	MPC · JPL
484168	2006 UM_{158}	—	October 2, 2006	Mount Lemmon	Mount Lemmon Survey	EUN	1.2 km	MPC · JPL
484169	2006 UO_{171}	—	October 3, 2006	Mount Lemmon	Mount Lemmon Survey	HOF	2.2 km	MPC · JPL
484170	2006 UF_{175}	—	September 30, 2006	Catalina	CSS	·	2.0 km	MPC · JPL
484171	2006 UN_{186}	—	September 28, 2006	Catalina	CSS	·	2.0 km	MPC · JPL
484172	2006 UD_{227}	—	September 25, 2006	Kitt Peak	Spacewatch	·	1.6 km	MPC · JPL
484173	2006 UM_{227}	—	October 3, 2006	Mount Lemmon	Mount Lemmon Survey	·	1.7 km	MPC · JPL
484174	2006 UM_{235}	—	September 28, 2006	Kitt Peak	Spacewatch	·	1.3 km	MPC · JPL
484175	2006 UK_{247}	—	September 26, 2006	Mount Lemmon	Mount Lemmon Survey	·	1.5 km	MPC · JPL
484176	2006 UE_{255}	—	October 12, 2006	Kitt Peak	Spacewatch	·	1.6 km	MPC · JPL
484177	2006 UY_{261}	—	October 28, 2006	Mount Lemmon	Mount Lemmon Survey	·	1.7 km	MPC · JPL
484178	2006 UA_{272}	—	October 27, 2006	Mount Lemmon	Mount Lemmon Survey	·	560 m	MPC · JPL
484179	2006 UE_{272}	—	September 27, 2006	Mount Lemmon	Mount Lemmon Survey	·	1.7 km	MPC · JPL
484180	2006 UY_{275}	—	October 28, 2006	Kitt Peak	Spacewatch	·	510 m	MPC · JPL
484181	2006 UQ_{277}	—	October 2, 2006	Mount Lemmon	Mount Lemmon Survey	·	1.9 km	MPC · JPL
484182	2006 UP_{286}	—	October 16, 2006	Kitt Peak	Spacewatch	·	1.5 km	MPC · JPL
484183	2006 UP_{335}	—	October 17, 2006	Catalina	CSS	·	1.9 km	MPC · JPL
484184	2006 UV_{358}	—	October 19, 2006	Kitt Peak	Spacewatch	HOF	2.3 km	MPC · JPL
484185	2006 UO_{360}	—	October 31, 2006	Mount Lemmon	Mount Lemmon Survey	·	1.7 km	MPC · JPL
484186	2006 VK_{1}	—	October 21, 2006	Kitt Peak	Spacewatch	DOR	1.8 km	MPC · JPL
484187	2006 VX_{36}	—	October 4, 2006	Mount Lemmon	Mount Lemmon Survey	·	1.8 km	MPC · JPL
484188	2006 VG_{41}	—	November 12, 2006	Mount Lemmon	Mount Lemmon Survey	AST	1.5 km	MPC · JPL
484189	2006 VO_{43}	—	October 22, 2006	Kitt Peak	Spacewatch	·	1.4 km	MPC · JPL
484190	2006 VJ_{57}	—	November 11, 2006	Kitt Peak	Spacewatch	·	1.5 km	MPC · JPL
484191	2006 VN_{76}	—	November 12, 2006	Mount Lemmon	Mount Lemmon Survey	·	1.7 km	MPC · JPL
484192	2006 VN_{98}	—	October 2, 2006	Mount Lemmon	Mount Lemmon Survey	·	2.3 km	MPC · JPL
484193	2006 VE_{103}	—	November 12, 2006	Mount Lemmon	Mount Lemmon Survey	·	1.6 km	MPC · JPL
484194	2006 VJ_{111}	—	November 13, 2006	Kitt Peak	Spacewatch	·	640 m	MPC · JPL
484195	2006 VA_{129}	—	November 15, 2006	Kitt Peak	Spacewatch	·	1.8 km	MPC · JPL
484196	2006 VF_{129}	—	September 27, 2006	Mount Lemmon	Mount Lemmon Survey	·	2.4 km	MPC · JPL
484197	2006 VU_{132}	—	October 23, 2006	Mount Lemmon	Mount Lemmon Survey	·	580 m	MPC · JPL
484198	2006 VX_{154}	—	November 8, 2006	Palomar	NEAT	·	670 m	MPC · JPL
484199	2006 WS_{1}	—	November 19, 2006	Mount Lemmon	Mount Lemmon Survey	APO	390 m	MPC · JPL
484200	2006 WD_{16}	—	November 17, 2006	Kitt Peak	Spacewatch	·	1.7 km	MPC · JPL

== 484201–484300 ==
back to top

Designation			Discovery			Properties		Ref
Permanent	Provisional	Named after	Date	Site	Discoverer(s)	Category	Diam.	Ref
484201	2006 WY_{19}	—	October 21, 2006	Mount Lemmon	Mount Lemmon Survey	AEO	1.0 km	MPC · JPL
484202	2006 WL_{32}	—	October 23, 2006	Mount Lemmon	Mount Lemmon Survey	AGN	930 m	MPC · JPL
484203	2006 WB_{179}	—	November 24, 2006	Mount Lemmon	Mount Lemmon Survey	·	1.5 km	MPC · JPL
484204	2006 XT_{18}	—	November 20, 2006	Catalina	CSS	·	3.2 km	MPC · JPL
484205	2006 XK_{23}	—	December 12, 2006	Mount Lemmon	Mount Lemmon Survey	WIT	790 m	MPC · JPL
484206	2006 XO_{38}	—	December 11, 2006	Kitt Peak	Spacewatch	·	520 m	MPC · JPL
484207	2007 AD_{30}	—	January 9, 2007	Kitt Peak	Spacewatch	·	1.8 km	MPC · JPL
484208	2007 BT_{36}	—	December 26, 2006	Kitt Peak	Spacewatch	·	1.6 km	MPC · JPL
484209	2007 BW_{80}	—	January 25, 2007	Kitt Peak	Spacewatch	·	680 m	MPC · JPL
484210	2007 CC_{8}	—	January 17, 2007	Kitt Peak	Spacewatch	(883)	520 m	MPC · JPL
484211	2007 CK_{8}	—	June 18, 2005	Mount Lemmon	Mount Lemmon Survey	·	1.9 km	MPC · JPL
484212	2007 CN_{32}	—	October 1, 2005	Kitt Peak	Spacewatch	KOR	1.3 km	MPC · JPL
484213	2007 CU_{35}	—	February 6, 2007	Mount Lemmon	Mount Lemmon Survey	·	600 m	MPC · JPL
484214	2007 DA_{8}	—	February 17, 2007	Calvin-Rehoboth	Calvin College	·	500 m	MPC · JPL
484215	2007 DK_{48}	—	February 21, 2007	Mount Lemmon	Mount Lemmon Survey	·	1.8 km	MPC · JPL
484216	2007 DR_{58}	—	February 21, 2007	Mount Lemmon	Mount Lemmon Survey	·	450 m	MPC · JPL
484217	2007 DQ_{67}	—	February 21, 2007	Kitt Peak	Spacewatch	·	520 m	MPC · JPL
484218	2007 DQ_{70}	—	February 21, 2007	Kitt Peak	Spacewatch	L5	8.2 km	MPC · JPL
484219	2007 DU_{89}	—	February 23, 2007	Kitt Peak	Spacewatch	·	460 m	MPC · JPL
484220	2007 DK_{96}	—	February 23, 2007	Mount Lemmon	Mount Lemmon Survey	H	500 m	MPC · JPL
484221	2007 DT_{98}	—	February 8, 2007	Kitt Peak	Spacewatch	·	550 m	MPC · JPL
484222	2007 DP_{102}	—	February 23, 2007	Catalina	CSS	H	390 m	MPC · JPL
484223	2007 DT_{102}	—	February 26, 2007	Catalina	CSS	·	1.1 km	MPC · JPL
484224	2007 DY_{110}	—	February 23, 2007	Mount Lemmon	Mount Lemmon Survey	·	1.3 km	MPC · JPL
484225	2007 DM_{115}	—	February 17, 2007	Mount Lemmon	Mount Lemmon Survey	L5	12 km	MPC · JPL
484226	2007 DD_{117}	—	February 17, 2007	Kitt Peak	Spacewatch	·	2.7 km	MPC · JPL
484227	2007 EK_{29}	—	March 9, 2007	Kitt Peak	Spacewatch	·	2.8 km	MPC · JPL
484228	2007 EG_{39}	—	March 12, 2007	Mount Lemmon	Mount Lemmon Survey	H	610 m	MPC · JPL
484229	2007 EO_{54}	—	January 27, 2007	Kitt Peak	Spacewatch	·	2.1 km	MPC · JPL
484230	2007 EW_{59}	—	February 27, 2007	Kitt Peak	Spacewatch	·	1.6 km	MPC · JPL
484231	2007 EE_{68}	—	February 25, 2007	Mount Lemmon	Mount Lemmon Survey	L5	8.7 km	MPC · JPL
484232	2007 EK_{71}	—	March 10, 2007	Kitt Peak	Spacewatch	·	1.3 km	MPC · JPL
484233	2007 ES_{92}	—	January 28, 2007	Kitt Peak	Spacewatch	·	630 m	MPC · JPL
484234	2007 EL_{129}	—	February 23, 2007	Mount Lemmon	Mount Lemmon Survey	·	1.4 km	MPC · JPL
484235	2007 EQ_{142}	—	March 12, 2007	Kitt Peak	Spacewatch	·	1.4 km	MPC · JPL
484236	2007 EQ_{147}	—	February 27, 2007	Kitt Peak	Spacewatch	·	1.6 km	MPC · JPL
484237	2007 EF_{149}	—	February 26, 2007	Mount Lemmon	Mount Lemmon Survey	·	3.1 km	MPC · JPL
484238	2007 EK_{150}	—	March 12, 2007	Mount Lemmon	Mount Lemmon Survey	·	780 m	MPC · JPL
484239	2007 EA_{153}	—	March 12, 2007	Mount Lemmon	Mount Lemmon Survey	·	530 m	MPC · JPL
484240	2007 EQ_{172}	—	March 14, 2007	Kitt Peak	Spacewatch	·	630 m	MPC · JPL
484241	2007 EL_{181}	—	March 14, 2007	Kitt Peak	Spacewatch	·	2.7 km	MPC · JPL
484242	2007 EM_{190}	—	March 13, 2007	Mount Lemmon	Mount Lemmon Survey	·	1.4 km	MPC · JPL
484243	2007 EK_{198}	—	March 15, 2007	Mount Lemmon	Mount Lemmon Survey	·	660 m	MPC · JPL
484244	2007 EV_{211}	—	February 21, 2007	Mount Lemmon	Mount Lemmon Survey	·	630 m	MPC · JPL
484245	2007 EG_{215}	—	January 15, 2007	Mount Lemmon	Mount Lemmon Survey	·	730 m	MPC · JPL
484246	2007 FR_{1}	—	February 17, 2007	Mount Lemmon	Mount Lemmon Survey	·	2.6 km	MPC · JPL
484247	2007 FL_{3}	—	March 19, 2007	Catalina	CSS	·	990 m	MPC · JPL
484248	2007 FN_{40}	—	March 20, 2007	Anderson Mesa	LONEOS	·	1.4 km	MPC · JPL
484249	2007 FY_{40}	—	March 20, 2007	Mount Lemmon	Mount Lemmon Survey	L5	7.1 km	MPC · JPL
484250	2007 FJ_{45}	—	February 23, 2007	Mount Lemmon	Mount Lemmon Survey	·	1.5 km	MPC · JPL
484251	2007 FA_{46}	—	March 25, 2007	Mount Lemmon	Mount Lemmon Survey	·	2.4 km	MPC · JPL
484252	2007 FH_{46}	—	March 26, 2007	Kitt Peak	Spacewatch	·	2.2 km	MPC · JPL
484253	2007 FW_{46}	—	March 18, 2007	Kitt Peak	Spacewatch	·	2.3 km	MPC · JPL
484254	2007 FN_{48}	—	March 16, 2007	Mount Lemmon	Mount Lemmon Survey	L5	7.5 km	MPC · JPL
484255	2007 GH_{25}	—	April 12, 2007	Črni Vrh	B. Dintinjana, H. Mikuž	·	2.7 km	MPC · JPL
484256	2007 GE_{30}	—	April 14, 2007	Kitt Peak	Spacewatch	·	3.2 km	MPC · JPL
484257	2007 GB_{43}	—	March 15, 2007	Kitt Peak	Spacewatch	·	2.3 km	MPC · JPL
484258	2007 GN_{47}	—	April 14, 2007	Mount Lemmon	Mount Lemmon Survey	·	1.9 km	MPC · JPL
484259	2007 GO_{48}	—	April 14, 2007	Kitt Peak	Spacewatch	·	2.7 km	MPC · JPL
484260	2007 GT_{62}	—	April 15, 2007	Kitt Peak	Spacewatch	·	1.9 km	MPC · JPL
484261	2007 GG_{77}	—	April 11, 2007	Kitt Peak	Spacewatch	·	3.3 km	MPC · JPL
484262	2007 HO_{14}	—	April 15, 2007	Kitt Peak	Spacewatch	·	680 m	MPC · JPL
484263	2007 HX_{53}	—	April 22, 2007	Kitt Peak	Spacewatch	·	690 m	MPC · JPL
484264	2007 HE_{57}	—	April 22, 2007	Catalina	CSS	·	3.0 km	MPC · JPL
484265	2007 HW_{58}	—	March 25, 2007	Mount Lemmon	Mount Lemmon Survey	L5	7.7 km	MPC · JPL
484266	2007 HM_{71}	—	February 21, 2007	Mount Lemmon	Mount Lemmon Survey	·	2.0 km	MPC · JPL
484267	2007 HY_{79}	—	April 24, 2007	Kitt Peak	Spacewatch	·	2.7 km	MPC · JPL
484268	2007 HJ_{84}	—	March 26, 2007	Mount Lemmon	Mount Lemmon Survey	·	600 m	MPC · JPL
484269	2007 HP_{88}	—	April 20, 2007	Kitt Peak	Spacewatch	·	710 m	MPC · JPL
484270	2007 HT_{93}	—	March 13, 2007	Kitt Peak	Spacewatch	·	640 m	MPC · JPL
484271	2007 JB_{12}	—	January 15, 2007	Kitt Peak	Spacewatch	·	2.6 km	MPC · JPL
484272	2007 JD_{17}	—	April 14, 2007	Mount Lemmon	Mount Lemmon Survey	·	710 m	MPC · JPL
484273	2007 JQ_{17}	—	May 7, 2007	Kitt Peak	Spacewatch	·	3.1 km	MPC · JPL
484274	2007 JF_{18}	—	May 8, 2007	Kitt Peak	Spacewatch	·	2.3 km	MPC · JPL
484275	2007 JX_{21}	—	April 18, 2007	Mount Lemmon	Mount Lemmon Survey	·	700 m	MPC · JPL
484276	2007 JZ_{25}	—	April 25, 2007	Kitt Peak	Spacewatch	·	760 m	MPC · JPL
484277	2007 JA_{33}	—	April 25, 2007	Kitt Peak	Spacewatch	·	810 m	MPC · JPL
484278	2007 JK_{36}	—	April 24, 2007	Kitt Peak	Spacewatch	·	530 m	MPC · JPL
484279	2007 JL_{40}	—	May 11, 2007	Kitt Peak	Spacewatch	·	1.1 km	MPC · JPL
484280	2007 LF_{6}	—	June 8, 2007	Kitt Peak	Spacewatch	·	3.4 km	MPC · JPL
484281	2007 LF_{12}	—	May 25, 2007	Kitt Peak	Spacewatch	·	740 m	MPC · JPL
484282	2007 MC_{5}	—	May 10, 2007	Mount Lemmon	Mount Lemmon Survey	·	930 m	MPC · JPL
484283	2007 PP_{3}	—	August 6, 2007	Lulin	LUSS	·	1.2 km	MPC · JPL
484284	2007 PW_{15}	—	August 8, 2007	Socorro	LINEAR	·	2.0 km	MPC · JPL
484285	2007 PK_{18}	—	August 9, 2007	Socorro	LINEAR	PHO	880 m	MPC · JPL
484286	2007 PE_{39}	—	August 17, 2007	Socorro	LINEAR	·	1.5 km	MPC · JPL
484287	2007 RC_{10}	—	March 5, 2006	Kitt Peak	Spacewatch	T_{j} (2.96)	3.5 km	MPC · JPL
484288	2007 RN_{28}	—	September 4, 2007	Catalina	CSS	PHO	930 m	MPC · JPL
484289	2007 RA_{42}	—	October 5, 2003	Kitt Peak	Spacewatch	·	930 m	MPC · JPL
484290	2007 RG_{51}	—	September 9, 2007	Kitt Peak	Spacewatch	·	1.3 km	MPC · JPL
484291	2007 RJ_{52}	—	September 9, 2007	Kitt Peak	Spacewatch	·	2.3 km	MPC · JPL
484292	2007 RA_{59}	—	August 23, 2007	Kitt Peak	Spacewatch	·	1.2 km	MPC · JPL
484293	2007 RJ_{98}	—	September 10, 2007	Kitt Peak	Spacewatch	·	860 m	MPC · JPL
484294	2007 RU_{154}	—	September 10, 2007	Mount Lemmon	Mount Lemmon Survey	·	1.1 km	MPC · JPL
484295	2007 RX_{189}	—	September 10, 2007	Kitt Peak	Spacewatch	·	980 m	MPC · JPL
484296	2007 RW_{255}	—	September 14, 2007	Kitt Peak	Spacewatch	T_{j} (2.95) · 3:2	4.7 km	MPC · JPL
484297	2007 RR_{296}	—	September 12, 2007	Mount Lemmon	Mount Lemmon Survey	·	1.1 km	MPC · JPL
484298	2007 RD_{297}	—	September 10, 2007	Kitt Peak	Spacewatch	·	860 m	MPC · JPL
484299	2007 SF_{11}	—	September 2, 2007	Catalina	CSS	·	1.8 km	MPC · JPL
484300	2007 SJ_{12}	—	September 5, 2007	Catalina	CSS	·	1.6 km	MPC · JPL

== 484301–484400 ==
back to top

Designation			Discovery			Properties		Ref
Permanent	Provisional	Named after	Date	Site	Discoverer(s)	Category	Diam.	Ref
484301	2007 TK_{2}	—	October 4, 2007	Kitt Peak	Spacewatch	·	460 m	MPC · JPL
484302	2007 TZ_{4}	—	September 8, 2007	Mount Lemmon	Mount Lemmon Survey	·	1.1 km	MPC · JPL
484303	2007 TS_{17}	—	September 15, 2007	Mount Lemmon	Mount Lemmon Survey	·	1.6 km	MPC · JPL
484304	2007 TH_{74}	—	October 9, 2007	Anderson Mesa	LONEOS	·	1.6 km	MPC · JPL
484305	2007 TX_{75}	—	October 4, 2007	Kitt Peak	Spacewatch	·	770 m	MPC · JPL
484306	2007 TT_{84}	—	October 8, 2007	Kitt Peak	Spacewatch	·	1.3 km	MPC · JPL
484307	2007 TJ_{85}	—	October 8, 2007	Mount Lemmon	Mount Lemmon Survey	·	1.1 km	MPC · JPL
484308	2007 TG_{86}	—	October 8, 2007	Mount Lemmon	Mount Lemmon Survey	EUN	900 m	MPC · JPL
484309	2007 TD_{93}	—	October 6, 2007	Kitt Peak	Spacewatch	JUN	950 m	MPC · JPL
484310	2007 TO_{105}	—	September 13, 2007	Mount Lemmon	Mount Lemmon Survey	·	980 m	MPC · JPL
484311	2007 TM_{107}	—	October 4, 2007	Mount Lemmon	Mount Lemmon Survey	(5)	940 m	MPC · JPL
484312	2007 TM_{108}	—	September 12, 2007	Catalina	CSS	·	1.6 km	MPC · JPL
484313	2007 TE_{112}	—	October 8, 2007	Catalina	CSS	·	1.3 km	MPC · JPL
484314	2007 TF_{118}	—	September 11, 2007	Mount Lemmon	Mount Lemmon Survey	·	1.1 km	MPC · JPL
484315	2007 TG_{119}	—	October 9, 2007	Kitt Peak	Spacewatch	MAR	940 m	MPC · JPL
484316	2007 TO_{120}	—	September 8, 2007	Mount Lemmon	Mount Lemmon Survey	·	1.1 km	MPC · JPL
484317	2007 TV_{120}	—	October 4, 2007	Kitt Peak	Spacewatch	EUN	960 m	MPC · JPL
484318	2007 TV_{125}	—	September 15, 2007	Mount Lemmon	Mount Lemmon Survey	·	1.0 km	MPC · JPL
484319	2007 TX_{141}	—	October 9, 2007	Mount Lemmon	Mount Lemmon Survey	·	1.4 km	MPC · JPL
484320	2007 TX_{144}	—	September 11, 2007	Mount Lemmon	Mount Lemmon Survey	·	1.6 km	MPC · JPL
484321	2007 TP_{226}	—	October 8, 2007	Kitt Peak	Spacewatch	(5)	990 m	MPC · JPL
484322	2007 TW_{227}	—	October 8, 2007	Kitt Peak	Spacewatch	·	920 m	MPC · JPL
484323	2007 TP_{228}	—	October 8, 2007	Kitt Peak	Spacewatch	·	1.1 km	MPC · JPL
484324	2007 TL_{284}	—	October 9, 2007	Mount Lemmon	Mount Lemmon Survey	·	1.1 km	MPC · JPL
484325	2007 TQ_{333}	—	October 11, 2007	Kitt Peak	Spacewatch	·	1.1 km	MPC · JPL
484326	2007 TE_{342}	—	October 9, 2007	Mount Lemmon	Mount Lemmon Survey	·	930 m	MPC · JPL
484327	2007 TN_{346}	—	October 13, 2007	Mount Lemmon	Mount Lemmon Survey	EUN	890 m	MPC · JPL
484328	2007 TV_{362}	—	October 15, 2007	Mount Lemmon	Mount Lemmon Survey	·	1.2 km	MPC · JPL
484329	2007 TM_{382}	—	October 14, 2007	Kitt Peak	Spacewatch	·	1.3 km	MPC · JPL
484330	2007 TN_{382}	—	October 14, 2007	Kitt Peak	Spacewatch	·	1.2 km	MPC · JPL
484331	2007 TU_{397}	—	October 11, 2007	Kitt Peak	Spacewatch	·	1.7 km	MPC · JPL
484332	2007 TK_{426}	—	October 9, 2007	Mount Lemmon	Mount Lemmon Survey	·	900 m	MPC · JPL
484333	2007 TO_{433}	—	October 10, 2007	Catalina	CSS	·	1.3 km	MPC · JPL
484334	2007 TQ_{435}	—	October 14, 2007	Mount Lemmon	Mount Lemmon Survey	·	1.2 km	MPC · JPL
484335	2007 TE_{436}	—	October 7, 2007	Mount Lemmon	Mount Lemmon Survey	·	1.9 km	MPC · JPL
484336	2007 TH_{443}	—	October 15, 2007	Catalina	CSS	·	1.1 km	MPC · JPL
484337	2007 UY_{6}	—	October 19, 2007	7300	W. K. Y. Yeung	(5)	900 m	MPC · JPL
484338	2007 UK_{7}	—	October 9, 2007	Catalina	CSS	·	1.3 km	MPC · JPL
484339	2007 UW_{33}	—	October 8, 2007	Catalina	CSS	·	1.3 km	MPC · JPL
484340	2007 UH_{37}	—	October 10, 2007	Catalina	CSS	·	1.4 km	MPC · JPL
484341	2007 UF_{42}	—	October 16, 2007	Mount Lemmon	Mount Lemmon Survey	(5)	1.1 km	MPC · JPL
484342	2007 UL_{84}	—	October 8, 2007	Kitt Peak	Spacewatch	·	1.1 km	MPC · JPL
484343	2007 UJ_{90}	—	October 30, 2007	Mount Lemmon	Mount Lemmon Survey	·	1.1 km	MPC · JPL
484344	2007 UG_{94}	—	October 12, 2007	Kitt Peak	Spacewatch	·	1.1 km	MPC · JPL
484345	2007 UR_{122}	—	October 14, 2007	Mount Lemmon	Mount Lemmon Survey	JUN	930 m	MPC · JPL
484346	2007 UL_{128}	—	October 20, 2007	Mount Lemmon	Mount Lemmon Survey	·	1.3 km	MPC · JPL
484347	2007 UC_{130}	—	October 17, 2007	Mount Lemmon	Mount Lemmon Survey	·	1.5 km	MPC · JPL
484348	2007 UX_{139}	—	October 30, 2007	Kitt Peak	Spacewatch	·	1.2 km	MPC · JPL
484349	2007 US_{141}	—	October 20, 2007	Mount Lemmon	Mount Lemmon Survey	·	1.2 km	MPC · JPL
484350	2007 VW_{9}	—	November 3, 2007	7300	W. K. Y. Yeung	·	1.0 km	MPC · JPL
484351	2007 VY_{38}	—	November 2, 2007	Catalina	CSS	·	1.5 km	MPC · JPL
484352	2007 VC_{45}	—	November 1, 2007	Kitt Peak	Spacewatch	·	1.4 km	MPC · JPL
484353	2007 VT_{48}	—	October 9, 2007	Kitt Peak	Spacewatch	(5)	850 m	MPC · JPL
484354	2007 VW_{51}	—	October 7, 2007	Kitt Peak	Spacewatch	·	880 m	MPC · JPL
484355	2007 VO_{59}	—	November 1, 2007	Kitt Peak	Spacewatch	·	1.1 km	MPC · JPL
484356	2007 VE_{62}	—	November 1, 2007	Kitt Peak	Spacewatch	·	1.2 km	MPC · JPL
484357	2007 VS_{73}	—	November 2, 2007	Kitt Peak	Spacewatch	·	1.6 km	MPC · JPL
484358	2007 VU_{75}	—	October 14, 2007	Kitt Peak	Spacewatch	·	1.0 km	MPC · JPL
484359	2007 VL_{83}	—	November 4, 2007	Mount Lemmon	Mount Lemmon Survey	·	1.6 km	MPC · JPL
484360	2007 VC_{87}	—	October 16, 2007	Catalina	CSS	(1547)	1.4 km	MPC · JPL
484361	2007 VB_{92}	—	October 17, 2007	Mount Lemmon	Mount Lemmon Survey	KON	1.8 km	MPC · JPL
484362	2007 VS_{100}	—	November 2, 2007	Kitt Peak	Spacewatch	·	1.1 km	MPC · JPL
484363	2007 VA_{101}	—	November 2, 2007	Kitt Peak	Spacewatch	·	1.6 km	MPC · JPL
484364	2007 VY_{107}	—	October 17, 2007	Mount Lemmon	Mount Lemmon Survey	·	1.0 km	MPC · JPL
484365	2007 VB_{113}	—	November 3, 2007	Kitt Peak	Spacewatch	MIS	1.9 km	MPC · JPL
484366	2007 VG_{116}	—	November 3, 2007	Kitt Peak	Spacewatch	·	1.3 km	MPC · JPL
484367	2007 VP_{145}	—	November 4, 2007	Kitt Peak	Spacewatch	·	1.3 km	MPC · JPL
484368	2007 VW_{147}	—	November 4, 2007	Kitt Peak	Spacewatch	·	1.1 km	MPC · JPL
484369	2007 VE_{149}	—	October 8, 2007	Mount Lemmon	Mount Lemmon Survey	MIS	2.3 km	MPC · JPL
484370	2007 VF_{149}	—	October 12, 2007	Mount Lemmon	Mount Lemmon Survey	·	1.4 km	MPC · JPL
484371	2007 VR_{199}	—	October 12, 2007	Kitt Peak	Spacewatch	·	940 m	MPC · JPL
484372	2007 VQ_{212}	—	November 9, 2007	Kitt Peak	Spacewatch	·	1.3 km	MPC · JPL
484373	2007 VS_{212}	—	November 1, 2007	Kitt Peak	Spacewatch	MAR	920 m	MPC · JPL
484374	2007 VQ_{213}	—	November 9, 2007	Kitt Peak	Spacewatch	(5)	1.1 km	MPC · JPL
484375	2007 VR_{252}	—	November 9, 2007	Kitt Peak	Spacewatch	(5)	1.1 km	MPC · JPL
484376	2007 VT_{260}	—	October 7, 2007	Kitt Peak	Spacewatch	MAR	1.1 km	MPC · JPL
484377	2007 VO_{264}	—	October 14, 2007	Mount Lemmon	Mount Lemmon Survey	·	1.3 km	MPC · JPL
484378	2007 VH_{268}	—	November 12, 2007	Socorro	LINEAR	EUN	940 m	MPC · JPL
484379	2007 VA_{273}	—	November 2, 2007	Kitt Peak	Spacewatch	·	1.4 km	MPC · JPL
484380	2007 VE_{279}	—	November 3, 2007	Kitt Peak	Spacewatch	·	1.3 km	MPC · JPL
484381	2007 VF_{281}	—	November 5, 2007	Kitt Peak	Spacewatch	·	1.3 km	MPC · JPL
484382	2007 VQ_{282}	—	October 15, 2007	Mount Lemmon	Mount Lemmon Survey	3:2	3.5 km	MPC · JPL
484383	2007 VN_{294}	—	October 7, 2007	Kitt Peak	Spacewatch	·	750 m	MPC · JPL
484384	2007 VC_{297}	—	October 11, 2007	Catalina	CSS	·	1.8 km	MPC · JPL
484385	2007 VU_{307}	—	November 4, 2007	Kitt Peak	Spacewatch	JUN	1.0 km	MPC · JPL
484386	2007 VT_{308}	—	November 8, 2007	Kitt Peak	Spacewatch	·	1.1 km	MPC · JPL
484387	2007 VB_{313}	—	November 5, 2007	Mount Lemmon	Mount Lemmon Survey	·	1.1 km	MPC · JPL
484388	2007 VN_{327}	—	November 7, 2007	Kitt Peak	Spacewatch	·	990 m	MPC · JPL
484389	2007 VL_{330}	—	November 3, 2007	Mount Lemmon	Mount Lemmon Survey	·	1.1 km	MPC · JPL
484390	2007 WQ_{11}	—	November 9, 2007	Catalina	CSS	·	1.3 km	MPC · JPL
484391	2007 WC_{13}	—	October 20, 2007	Mount Lemmon	Mount Lemmon Survey	·	1.0 km	MPC · JPL
484392	2007 WO_{14}	—	November 7, 2007	Kitt Peak	Spacewatch	·	1.0 km	MPC · JPL
484393	2007 WM_{15}	—	November 18, 2007	Mount Lemmon	Mount Lemmon Survey	MIS	1.6 km	MPC · JPL
484394	2007 WV_{23}	—	November 18, 2007	Mount Lemmon	Mount Lemmon Survey	3:2	3.8 km	MPC · JPL
484395	2007 WQ_{39}	—	October 12, 2007	Mount Lemmon	Mount Lemmon Survey	·	1.2 km	MPC · JPL
484396	2007 WG_{58}	—	November 18, 2007	Mount Lemmon	Mount Lemmon Survey	EUN	1.3 km	MPC · JPL
484397	2007 WY_{61}	—	December 4, 2007	Catalina	CSS	(1547)	1.6 km	MPC · JPL
484398	2007 XA_{1}	—	November 1, 2007	Kitt Peak	Spacewatch	·	1.1 km	MPC · JPL
484399	2007 XO_{9}	—	December 4, 2007	Catalina	CSS	(1547)	1.3 km	MPC · JPL
484400	2007 XT_{10}	—	November 19, 2007	Kitt Peak	Spacewatch	T_{j} (2.94) · 3:2	4.6 km	MPC · JPL

== 484401–484500 ==
back to top

Designation			Discovery			Properties		Ref
Permanent	Provisional	Named after	Date	Site	Discoverer(s)	Category	Diam.	Ref
484401	2007 XW_{15}	—	December 8, 2007	La Sagra	OAM	·	1.6 km	MPC · JPL
484402	2007 XH_{16}	—	December 8, 2007	Siding Spring	SSS	APO · PHA	450 m	MPC · JPL
484403	2007 XF_{25}	—	December 15, 2007	Socorro	LINEAR	AMO	180 m	MPC · JPL
484404	2007 XK_{36}	—	December 6, 2007	Kitt Peak	Spacewatch	·	1.2 km	MPC · JPL
484405	2007 XE_{38}	—	September 18, 2007	Mount Lemmon	Mount Lemmon Survey	·	1.3 km	MPC · JPL
484406	2007 XB_{40}	—	December 13, 2007	Socorro	LINEAR	·	1.4 km	MPC · JPL
484407	2007 XT_{51}	—	December 5, 2007	Kitt Peak	Spacewatch	·	1.5 km	MPC · JPL
484408	2007 XU_{51}	—	December 5, 2007	Kitt Peak	Spacewatch	·	1.1 km	MPC · JPL
484409	2007 XR_{52}	—	December 15, 2007	Kitt Peak	Spacewatch	·	1.6 km	MPC · JPL
484410	2007 XV_{52}	—	December 6, 2007	Kitt Peak	Spacewatch	·	1.5 km	MPC · JPL
484411	2007 XL_{54}	—	December 5, 2007	Kitt Peak	Spacewatch	·	1.3 km	MPC · JPL
484412	2007 YB_{11}	—	December 17, 2007	Kitt Peak	Spacewatch	·	2.6 km	MPC · JPL
484413	2007 YU_{26}	—	October 7, 2007	Mount Lemmon	Mount Lemmon Survey	EUN	1.2 km	MPC · JPL
484414	2007 YU_{33}	—	November 20, 2007	Kitt Peak	Spacewatch	·	1.4 km	MPC · JPL
484415	2007 YZ_{51}	—	November 17, 2007	Kitt Peak	Spacewatch	·	1.4 km	MPC · JPL
484416	2007 YL_{58}	—	December 30, 2007	Kitt Peak	Spacewatch	·	1.3 km	MPC · JPL
484417	2007 YL_{64}	—	December 17, 2007	Mount Lemmon	Mount Lemmon Survey	·	1.6 km	MPC · JPL
484418	2007 YZ_{65}	—	December 30, 2007	Kitt Peak	Spacewatch	·	1.6 km	MPC · JPL
484419	2007 YC_{67}	—	November 13, 2007	Mount Lemmon	Mount Lemmon Survey	·	1.3 km	MPC · JPL
484420	2007 YW_{67}	—	December 19, 2007	Mount Lemmon	Mount Lemmon Survey	·	1.3 km	MPC · JPL
484421	2007 YG_{71}	—	December 20, 2007	Mount Lemmon	Mount Lemmon Survey	·	2.0 km	MPC · JPL
484422	2007 YW_{73}	—	December 31, 2007	Mount Lemmon	Mount Lemmon Survey	·	2.5 km	MPC · JPL
484423	2007 YY_{73}	—	December 31, 2007	Kitt Peak	Spacewatch	·	1.7 km	MPC · JPL
484424	2007 YV_{74}	—	December 31, 2007	Mount Lemmon	Mount Lemmon Survey	·	1.5 km	MPC · JPL
484425	2008 AP_{15}	—	January 10, 2008	Mount Lemmon	Mount Lemmon Survey	·	1.2 km	MPC · JPL
484426	2008 AM_{22}	—	November 19, 2007	Mount Lemmon	Mount Lemmon Survey	·	1.6 km	MPC · JPL
484427	2008 AN_{22}	—	January 10, 2008	Mount Lemmon	Mount Lemmon Survey	·	1.3 km	MPC · JPL
484428	2008 AJ_{23}	—	January 10, 2008	Mount Lemmon	Mount Lemmon Survey	AEO	980 m	MPC · JPL
484429	2008 AO_{27}	—	January 10, 2008	Mount Lemmon	Mount Lemmon Survey	·	1.4 km	MPC · JPL
484430	2008 AL_{28}	—	January 10, 2008	Mount Lemmon	Mount Lemmon Survey	·	1.5 km	MPC · JPL
484431	2008 AP_{29}	—	January 12, 2008	Pla D'Arguines	R. Ferrando	·	2.7 km	MPC · JPL
484432	2008 AH_{38}	—	January 10, 2008	Mount Lemmon	Mount Lemmon Survey	·	1.7 km	MPC · JPL
484433	2008 AT_{40}	—	January 10, 2008	Mount Lemmon	Mount Lemmon Survey	·	1.6 km	MPC · JPL
484434	2008 AJ_{45}	—	December 14, 2007	Mount Lemmon	Mount Lemmon Survey	(1547)	1.6 km	MPC · JPL
484435	2008 AS_{45}	—	December 18, 2007	Kitt Peak	Spacewatch	·	1.8 km	MPC · JPL
484436	2008 AR_{48}	—	October 21, 2007	Mount Lemmon	Mount Lemmon Survey	·	1.5 km	MPC · JPL
484437	2008 AB_{54}	—	January 11, 2008	Kitt Peak	Spacewatch	·	1.3 km	MPC · JPL
484438	2008 AK_{55}	—	January 11, 2008	Kitt Peak	Spacewatch	AGN	1.2 km	MPC · JPL
484439	2008 AV_{76}	—	January 12, 2008	Kitt Peak	Spacewatch	·	1.7 km	MPC · JPL
484440	2008 AM_{79}	—	January 12, 2008	Kitt Peak	Spacewatch	·	1.6 km	MPC · JPL
484441	2008 AP_{91}	—	December 31, 2007	Mount Lemmon	Mount Lemmon Survey	·	1.7 km	MPC · JPL
484442	2008 AL_{93}	—	November 8, 2007	Mount Lemmon	Mount Lemmon Survey	·	2.0 km	MPC · JPL
484443	2008 AR_{95}	—	January 14, 2008	Kitt Peak	Spacewatch	·	1.9 km	MPC · JPL
484444	2008 AS_{98}	—	January 1, 2008	Kitt Peak	Spacewatch	·	1.4 km	MPC · JPL
484445	2008 AP_{109}	—	December 31, 2007	Kitt Peak	Spacewatch	·	1.4 km	MPC · JPL
484446	2008 AL_{110}	—	January 15, 2008	Kitt Peak	Spacewatch	·	1.7 km	MPC · JPL
484447	2008 AS_{128}	—	December 30, 2007	Kitt Peak	Spacewatch	·	1.6 km	MPC · JPL
484448	2008 BW_{4}	—	January 16, 2008	Kitt Peak	Spacewatch	(17392)	1.3 km	MPC · JPL
484449	2008 BM_{15}	—	December 31, 2007	Kitt Peak	Spacewatch	·	1.5 km	MPC · JPL
484450	2008 BD_{18}	—	January 30, 2008	Mount Lemmon	Mount Lemmon Survey	·	1.9 km	MPC · JPL
484451	2008 BC_{20}	—	December 30, 2007	Kitt Peak	Spacewatch	·	1.4 km	MPC · JPL
484452	2008 BY_{22}	—	January 31, 2008	Mount Lemmon	Mount Lemmon Survey	·	2.2 km	MPC · JPL
484453	2008 BQ_{31}	—	January 30, 2008	Mount Lemmon	Mount Lemmon Survey	·	1.6 km	MPC · JPL
484454	2008 BJ_{48}	—	January 18, 2008	Mount Lemmon	Mount Lemmon Survey	JUN	950 m	MPC · JPL
484455	2008 BX_{50}	—	January 30, 2008	Mount Lemmon	Mount Lemmon Survey	·	1.9 km	MPC · JPL
484456	2008 BP_{51}	—	January 17, 2008	Mount Lemmon	Mount Lemmon Survey	·	1.6 km	MPC · JPL
484457	2008 CU_{2}	—	February 1, 2008	Mount Lemmon	Mount Lemmon Survey	·	1.2 km	MPC · JPL
484458	2008 CC_{10}	—	January 10, 2008	Kitt Peak	Spacewatch	·	1.4 km	MPC · JPL
484459	2008 CW_{13}	—	February 3, 2008	Kitt Peak	Spacewatch	·	1.4 km	MPC · JPL
484460	2008 CW_{18}	—	February 3, 2008	Kitt Peak	Spacewatch	·	1.4 km	MPC · JPL
484461	2008 CD_{20}	—	February 3, 2008	Kitt Peak	Spacewatch	GEF	1.2 km	MPC · JPL
484462	2008 CM_{20}	—	February 8, 2008	Mount Lemmon	Mount Lemmon Survey	AMO · APO	180 m	MPC · JPL
484463	2008 CA_{37}	—	December 31, 2007	Mount Lemmon	Mount Lemmon Survey	·	1.9 km	MPC · JPL
484464	2008 CJ_{38}	—	December 31, 2007	Mount Lemmon	Mount Lemmon Survey	·	1.8 km	MPC · JPL
484465	2008 CX_{52}	—	February 3, 2008	Kitt Peak	Spacewatch	·	1.7 km	MPC · JPL
484466	2008 CZ_{58}	—	February 7, 2008	Mount Lemmon	Mount Lemmon Survey	·	1.4 km	MPC · JPL
484467	2008 CS_{60}	—	February 7, 2008	Mount Lemmon	Mount Lemmon Survey	ADE	1.9 km	MPC · JPL
484468	2008 CH_{66}	—	February 8, 2008	Mount Lemmon	Mount Lemmon Survey	·	1.2 km	MPC · JPL
484469	2008 CB_{88}	—	February 7, 2008	Mount Lemmon	Mount Lemmon Survey	·	1.7 km	MPC · JPL
484470	2008 CU_{91}	—	February 8, 2008	Kitt Peak	Spacewatch	HOF	2.1 km	MPC · JPL
484471	2008 CA_{96}	—	December 30, 2007	Kitt Peak	Spacewatch	·	1.6 km	MPC · JPL
484472	2008 CT_{100}	—	December 31, 2007	Mount Lemmon	Mount Lemmon Survey	EUN	900 m	MPC · JPL
484473	2008 CV_{102}	—	January 18, 2008	Kitt Peak	Spacewatch	·	1.5 km	MPC · JPL
484474	2008 CB_{103}	—	February 9, 2008	Kitt Peak	Spacewatch	·	1.5 km	MPC · JPL
484475	2008 CG_{105}	—	February 9, 2008	Mount Lemmon	Mount Lemmon Survey	·	1.7 km	MPC · JPL
484476	2008 CV_{119}	—	February 13, 2008	Anderson Mesa	LONEOS	·	1.7 km	MPC · JPL
484477	2008 CW_{121}	—	December 20, 2007	Mount Lemmon	Mount Lemmon Survey	·	1.7 km	MPC · JPL
484478	2008 CY_{122}	—	January 30, 2008	Mount Lemmon	Mount Lemmon Survey	AEO	920 m	MPC · JPL
484479	2008 CN_{125}	—	January 11, 2008	Mount Lemmon	Mount Lemmon Survey	WIT	820 m	MPC · JPL
484480	2008 CF_{136}	—	February 8, 2008	Mount Lemmon	Mount Lemmon Survey	·	1.3 km	MPC · JPL
484481	2008 CD_{145}	—	February 9, 2008	Kitt Peak	Spacewatch	·	1.6 km	MPC · JPL
484482	2008 CW_{155}	—	February 9, 2008	Catalina	CSS	·	2.1 km	MPC · JPL
484483	2008 CA_{160}	—	February 9, 2008	Kitt Peak	Spacewatch	·	1.6 km	MPC · JPL
484484	2008 CF_{170}	—	February 12, 2008	Mount Lemmon	Mount Lemmon Survey	·	1.8 km	MPC · JPL
484485	2008 CG_{178}	—	January 31, 2008	Catalina	CSS	·	1.6 km	MPC · JPL
484486	2008 CG_{182}	—	December 14, 2007	Mount Lemmon	Mount Lemmon Survey	JUN	970 m	MPC · JPL
484487	2008 CX_{184}	—	February 6, 2008	Mayhill	Lowe, A.	·	1.8 km	MPC · JPL
484488	2008 CZ_{191}	—	February 2, 2008	Kitt Peak	Spacewatch	·	1.7 km	MPC · JPL
484489	2008 CA_{192}	—	February 2, 2008	Kitt Peak	Spacewatch	·	1.4 km	MPC · JPL
484490	2008 CK_{196}	—	February 13, 2008	Mount Lemmon	Mount Lemmon Survey	GEF	910 m	MPC · JPL
484491	2008 CC_{198}	—	February 11, 2008	Kitt Peak	Spacewatch	·	1.6 km	MPC · JPL
484492	2008 CA_{208}	—	February 12, 2008	Kitt Peak	Spacewatch	·	1.5 km	MPC · JPL
484493	2008 DB_{22}	—	December 5, 2007	Mount Lemmon	Mount Lemmon Survey	·	1.3 km	MPC · JPL
484494	2008 DV_{23}	—	February 3, 2008	Kitt Peak	Spacewatch	·	1.5 km	MPC · JPL
484495	2008 DE_{24}	—	January 31, 2008	Kitt Peak	Spacewatch	·	1.8 km	MPC · JPL
484496	2008 DR_{31}	—	February 27, 2008	Kitt Peak	Spacewatch	·	2.5 km	MPC · JPL
484497	2008 DZ_{39}	—	February 11, 2008	Mount Lemmon	Mount Lemmon Survey	·	1.9 km	MPC · JPL
484498	2008 DE_{44}	—	February 28, 2008	Kitt Peak	Spacewatch	·	1.6 km	MPC · JPL
484499	2008 DQ_{54}	—	February 27, 2008	Catalina	CSS	·	2.2 km	MPC · JPL
484500	2008 DJ_{58}	—	January 11, 2008	Kitt Peak	Spacewatch	·	1.8 km	MPC · JPL

== 484501–484600 ==
back to top

Designation			Discovery			Properties		Ref
Permanent	Provisional	Named after	Date	Site	Discoverer(s)	Category	Diam.	Ref
484501	2008 DM_{76}	—	February 28, 2008	Mount Lemmon	Mount Lemmon Survey	·	1.6 km	MPC · JPL
484502	2008 DL_{82}	—	February 28, 2008	Kitt Peak	Spacewatch	(13314)	1.7 km	MPC · JPL
484503	2008 DJ_{83}	—	February 29, 2008	Kitt Peak	Spacewatch	·	1.5 km	MPC · JPL
484504	2008 DE_{84}	—	February 18, 2008	Mount Lemmon	Mount Lemmon Survey	·	1.9 km	MPC · JPL
484505	2008 DX_{86}	—	February 25, 2008	Mount Lemmon	Mount Lemmon Survey	·	1.9 km	MPC · JPL
484506	2008 ER_{7}	—	March 6, 2008	Kitt Peak	Spacewatch	APO · PHA	330 m	MPC · JPL
484507	2008 ES_{13}	—	February 10, 2008	Kitt Peak	Spacewatch	·	1.8 km	MPC · JPL
484508	2008 EK_{16}	—	March 1, 2008	Kitt Peak	Spacewatch	·	1.9 km	MPC · JPL
484509	2008 EZ_{18}	—	December 18, 2007	Mount Lemmon	Mount Lemmon Survey	·	1.5 km	MPC · JPL
484510	2008 EV_{20}	—	March 2, 2008	Kitt Peak	Spacewatch	·	2.3 km	MPC · JPL
484511	2008 EF_{25}	—	February 9, 2008	Kitt Peak	Spacewatch	·	1.3 km	MPC · JPL
484512	2008 EH_{28}	—	March 4, 2008	Mount Lemmon	Mount Lemmon Survey	·	2.3 km	MPC · JPL
484513	2008 ET_{38}	—	March 4, 2008	Kitt Peak	Spacewatch	·	1.3 km	MPC · JPL
484514	2008 ED_{45}	—	January 30, 2008	Mount Lemmon	Mount Lemmon Survey	DOR	2.7 km	MPC · JPL
484515	2008 EL_{51}	—	March 6, 2008	Kitt Peak	Spacewatch	·	1.8 km	MPC · JPL
484516	2008 ER_{51}	—	March 6, 2008	Mount Lemmon	Mount Lemmon Survey	·	2.1 km	MPC · JPL
484517	2008 EC_{69}	—	March 11, 2008	Catalina	CSS	T_{j} (2.93) · AMO +1km · PHA	1.3 km	MPC · JPL
484518	2008 EW_{90}	—	March 3, 2008	Purple Mountain	PMO NEO Survey Program	·	1.9 km	MPC · JPL
484519	2008 EJ_{105}	—	February 2, 2008	Kitt Peak	Spacewatch	·	2.0 km	MPC · JPL
484520	2008 EP_{105}	—	February 2, 2008	Kitt Peak	Spacewatch	·	1.7 km	MPC · JPL
484521	2008 EZ_{113}	—	March 8, 2008	Catalina	CSS	·	1.8 km	MPC · JPL
484522	2008 EB_{120}	—	March 9, 2008	Kitt Peak	Spacewatch	·	1.4 km	MPC · JPL
484523	2008 ET_{134}	—	March 1, 2008	Kitt Peak	Spacewatch	DOR	1.7 km	MPC · JPL
484524	2008 EP_{140}	—	February 2, 2008	Mount Lemmon	Mount Lemmon Survey	GEF	1.1 km	MPC · JPL
484525	2008 EP_{149}	—	March 4, 2008	XuYi	PMO NEO Survey Program	·	2.5 km	MPC · JPL
484526	2008 ES_{152}	—	March 11, 2008	Kitt Peak	Spacewatch	·	1.5 km	MPC · JPL
484527	2008 EE_{154}	—	March 15, 2008	Mount Lemmon	Mount Lemmon Survey	·	1.5 km	MPC · JPL
484528	2008 EC_{157}	—	March 13, 2008	Kitt Peak	Spacewatch	·	1.2 km	MPC · JPL
484529	2008 EK_{165}	—	March 2, 2008	Mount Lemmon	Mount Lemmon Survey	·	1.5 km	MPC · JPL
484530	2008 EC_{167}	—	March 29, 2008	Catalina	CSS	·	1.8 km	MPC · JPL
484531	2008 FN_{1}	—	March 25, 2008	Kitt Peak	Spacewatch	·	2.0 km	MPC · JPL
484532	2008 FT_{2}	—	March 8, 2008	Mount Lemmon	Mount Lemmon Survey	·	1.7 km	MPC · JPL
484533	2008 FF_{38}	—	March 10, 2008	Kitt Peak	Spacewatch	·	1.8 km	MPC · JPL
484534	2008 FB_{58}	—	March 28, 2008	Mount Lemmon	Mount Lemmon Survey	·	1.2 km	MPC · JPL
484535	2008 FA_{68}	—	March 28, 2008	Mount Lemmon	Mount Lemmon Survey	·	1.9 km	MPC · JPL
484536	2008 FF_{81}	—	March 27, 2008	Mount Lemmon	Mount Lemmon Survey	DOR	1.9 km	MPC · JPL
484537	2008 FY_{83}	—	March 28, 2008	Kitt Peak	Spacewatch	·	570 m	MPC · JPL
484538	2008 FK_{89}	—	March 29, 2008	Mount Lemmon	Mount Lemmon Survey	·	1.9 km	MPC · JPL
484539	2008 FW_{102}	—	March 30, 2008	Kitt Peak	Spacewatch	·	1.5 km	MPC · JPL
484540	2008 FV_{120}	—	March 11, 2008	Mount Lemmon	Mount Lemmon Survey	L5	10 km	MPC · JPL
484541	2008 FJ_{133}	—	March 8, 2008	Mount Lemmon	Mount Lemmon Survey	·	1.5 km	MPC · JPL
484542	2008 GU_{9}	—	April 1, 2008	Kitt Peak	Spacewatch	EOS	1.7 km	MPC · JPL
484543	2008 GV_{9}	—	April 1, 2008	Kitt Peak	Spacewatch	·	2.9 km	MPC · JPL
484544	2008 GL_{31}	—	April 3, 2008	Kitt Peak	Spacewatch	·	1.7 km	MPC · JPL
484545	2008 GM_{37}	—	April 3, 2008	Kitt Peak	Spacewatch	L5	6.8 km	MPC · JPL
484546	2008 GR_{39}	—	March 11, 2008	Kitt Peak	Spacewatch	·	1.6 km	MPC · JPL
484547	2008 GQ_{42}	—	March 29, 2008	Kitt Peak	Spacewatch	·	1.5 km	MPC · JPL
484548	2008 GF_{67}	—	March 5, 2008	Kitt Peak	Spacewatch	·	2.4 km	MPC · JPL
484549	2008 GW_{73}	—	April 7, 2008	Kitt Peak	Spacewatch	L5	7.7 km	MPC · JPL
484550	2008 GF_{79}	—	April 7, 2008	Kitt Peak	Spacewatch	·	1.5 km	MPC · JPL
484551	2008 GG_{111}	—	March 30, 2008	Catalina	CSS	·	2.0 km	MPC · JPL
484552	2008 GQ_{128}	—	April 15, 2008	Catalina	CSS	·	1.6 km	MPC · JPL
484553	2008 GJ_{140}	—	April 6, 2008	Mount Lemmon	Mount Lemmon Survey	L5	8.6 km	MPC · JPL
484554	2008 GA_{144}	—	April 16, 2008	Catalina	CSS	·	1.6 km	MPC · JPL
484555	2008 HN_{8}	—	April 3, 2008	Mount Lemmon	Mount Lemmon Survey	·	1.6 km	MPC · JPL
484556	2008 HB_{18}	—	April 26, 2008	Kitt Peak	Spacewatch	·	2.3 km	MPC · JPL
484557	2008 HR_{31}	—	March 29, 2008	Kitt Peak	Spacewatch	L5	7.9 km	MPC · JPL
484558	2008 HA_{35}	—	April 28, 2008	Kitt Peak	Spacewatch	·	2.6 km	MPC · JPL
484559	2008 HN_{42}	—	February 6, 2008	Kitt Peak	Spacewatch	L5	8.0 km	MPC · JPL
484560	2008 HW_{56}	—	April 30, 2008	Kitt Peak	Spacewatch	·	2.0 km	MPC · JPL
484561	2008 HK_{70}	—	March 31, 2003	Anderson Mesa	LONEOS	·	1.7 km	MPC · JPL
484562	2008 JZ_{23}	—	April 29, 2008	Kitt Peak	Spacewatch	EOS	1.7 km	MPC · JPL
484563	2008 JM_{37}	—	May 4, 2008	Kitt Peak	Spacewatch	·	2.8 km	MPC · JPL
484564	2008 JM_{40}	—	May 11, 2008	Mount Lemmon	Mount Lemmon Survey	·	2.7 km	MPC · JPL
484565	2008 KR_{37}	—	May 30, 2008	Kitt Peak	Spacewatch	·	2.6 km	MPC · JPL
484566	2008 KK_{38}	—	May 30, 2008	Kitt Peak	Spacewatch	L5	7.3 km	MPC · JPL
484567	2008 KB_{42}	—	May 5, 2008	Kitt Peak	Spacewatch	·	2.2 km	MPC · JPL
484568	2008 LT_{3}	—	April 11, 2008	Mount Lemmon	Mount Lemmon Survey	L5	10 km	MPC · JPL
484569	2008 LJ_{5}	—	June 3, 2008	Mount Lemmon	Mount Lemmon Survey	·	2.6 km	MPC · JPL
484570	2008 LS_{11}	—	May 3, 2008	Mount Lemmon	Mount Lemmon Survey	·	1.9 km	MPC · JPL
484571	2008 LS_{17}	—	June 6, 2008	Kitt Peak	Spacewatch	·	1.2 km	MPC · JPL
484572	2008 OK	—	July 25, 2008	La Sagra	OAM	PHO	1.2 km	MPC · JPL
484573	2008 OA_{11}	—	July 31, 2008	Socorro	LINEAR	·	3.6 km	MPC · JPL
484574	2008 QK_{13}	—	August 27, 2008	La Sagra	OAM	·	1.5 km	MPC · JPL
484575	2008 QA_{14}	—	July 30, 2008	Mount Lemmon	Mount Lemmon Survey	·	1.2 km	MPC · JPL
484576	2008 QS_{16}	—	August 26, 2008	La Sagra	OAM	·	1.2 km	MPC · JPL
484577	2008 QF_{17}	—	July 30, 2008	Kitt Peak	Spacewatch	·	1.2 km	MPC · JPL
484578	2008 QQ_{25}	—	July 29, 2008	Kitt Peak	Spacewatch	·	2.5 km	MPC · JPL
484579	2008 QT_{25}	—	August 30, 2008	Dauban	Kugel, F.	·	1.2 km	MPC · JPL
484580	2008 QA_{26}	—	August 9, 2008	La Sagra	OAM	·	850 m	MPC · JPL
484581	2008 QX_{27}	—	August 30, 2008	La Sagra	OAM	V	800 m	MPC · JPL
484582	2008 QG_{40}	—	July 30, 2008	Kitt Peak	Spacewatch	·	3.0 km	MPC · JPL
484583	2008 QR_{42}	—	August 29, 2008	La Sagra	OAM	·	3.9 km	MPC · JPL
484584	2008 QK_{47}	—	August 23, 2008	Kitt Peak	Spacewatch	NYS	1.0 km	MPC · JPL
484585	2008 RX_{2}	—	September 2, 2008	Kitt Peak	Spacewatch	·	590 m	MPC · JPL
484586	2008 RP_{3}	—	September 2, 2008	Kitt Peak	Spacewatch	·	1.1 km	MPC · JPL
484587	2008 RS_{7}	—	September 3, 2008	Kitt Peak	Spacewatch	·	2.8 km	MPC · JPL
484588	2008 RM_{11}	—	September 3, 2008	Kitt Peak	Spacewatch	NYS	890 m	MPC · JPL
484589	2008 RW_{21}	—	September 2, 2008	La Sagra	OAM	PHO	890 m	MPC · JPL
484590	2008 RU_{23}	—	August 26, 2008	La Sagra	OAM	H	470 m	MPC · JPL
484591	2008 RB_{69}	—	September 4, 2008	Kitt Peak	Spacewatch	·	920 m	MPC · JPL
484592	2008 RM_{71}	—	September 6, 2008	Mount Lemmon	Mount Lemmon Survey	·	2.6 km	MPC · JPL
484593	2008 RG_{93}	—	September 6, 2008	Kitt Peak	Spacewatch	·	3.2 km	MPC · JPL
484594	2008 RK_{106}	—	September 7, 2008	Mount Lemmon	Mount Lemmon Survey	THM	2.0 km	MPC · JPL
484595	2008 RO_{118}	—	September 9, 2008	Mount Lemmon	Mount Lemmon Survey	·	1.1 km	MPC · JPL
484596	2008 RB_{128}	—	September 7, 2008	Mount Lemmon	Mount Lemmon Survey	EOS	1.7 km	MPC · JPL
484597	2008 RS_{136}	—	September 4, 2008	Kitt Peak	Spacewatch	NYS	1.3 km	MPC · JPL
484598	2008 RP_{138}	—	September 6, 2008	Mount Lemmon	Mount Lemmon Survey	·	3.0 km	MPC · JPL
484599	2008 RT_{143}	—	September 6, 2008	Kitt Peak	Spacewatch	·	920 m	MPC · JPL
484600	2008 RS_{144}	—	September 5, 2008	Kitt Peak	Spacewatch	·	980 m	MPC · JPL

== 484601–484700 ==
back to top

Designation			Discovery			Properties		Ref
Permanent	Provisional	Named after	Date	Site	Discoverer(s)	Category	Diam.	Ref
484601	2008 SC_{1}	—	September 21, 2008	Grove Creek	Tozzi, F.	·	950 m	MPC · JPL
484602	2008 SD_{4}	—	September 4, 2008	Kitt Peak	Spacewatch	·	1.1 km	MPC · JPL
484603	2008 SB_{27}	—	September 3, 2008	Kitt Peak	Spacewatch	·	930 m	MPC · JPL
484604	2008 SM_{33}	—	September 20, 2008	Mount Lemmon	Mount Lemmon Survey	·	3.2 km	MPC · JPL
484605	2008 SZ_{33}	—	September 5, 2008	Kitt Peak	Spacewatch	·	1.1 km	MPC · JPL
484606	2008 SM_{35}	—	September 6, 2008	Mount Lemmon	Mount Lemmon Survey	·	980 m	MPC · JPL
484607	2008 SK_{42}	—	September 20, 2008	Kitt Peak	Spacewatch	·	980 m	MPC · JPL
484608	2008 SY_{45}	—	September 20, 2008	Kitt Peak	Spacewatch	V	650 m	MPC · JPL
484609	2008 SY_{56}	—	September 20, 2008	Kitt Peak	Spacewatch	·	860 m	MPC · JPL
484610	2008 SW_{58}	—	September 20, 2008	Kitt Peak	Spacewatch	MAS	670 m	MPC · JPL
484611	2008 SB_{61}	—	September 20, 2008	Catalina	CSS	NYS	1.1 km	MPC · JPL
484612	2008 SG_{64}	—	September 21, 2008	Kitt Peak	Spacewatch	·	1.2 km	MPC · JPL
484613 Cerebrito	2008 SC_{82}	Cerebrito	September 26, 2008	La Cañada	Lacruz, J.	·	860 m	MPC · JPL
484614	2008 SO_{85}	—	July 30, 2008	Kitt Peak	Spacewatch	·	2.9 km	MPC · JPL
484615	2008 SE_{95}	—	September 21, 2008	Kitt Peak	Spacewatch	·	1.3 km	MPC · JPL
484616	2008 SY_{105}	—	September 21, 2008	Catalina	CSS	·	1.2 km	MPC · JPL
484617	2008 SE_{110}	—	September 22, 2008	Kitt Peak	Spacewatch	NYS	950 m	MPC · JPL
484618	2008 SS_{116}	—	September 22, 2008	Mount Lemmon	Mount Lemmon Survey	·	1.0 km	MPC · JPL
484619	2008 SS_{119}	—	September 6, 2008	Mount Lemmon	Mount Lemmon Survey	NYS	920 m	MPC · JPL
484620	2008 SU_{120}	—	September 22, 2008	Mount Lemmon	Mount Lemmon Survey	MAS	490 m	MPC · JPL
484621	2008 SF_{122}	—	September 22, 2008	Mount Lemmon	Mount Lemmon Survey	·	860 m	MPC · JPL
484622	2008 SP_{124}	—	September 22, 2008	Mount Lemmon	Mount Lemmon Survey	·	860 m	MPC · JPL
484623	2008 SJ_{130}	—	September 22, 2008	Kitt Peak	Spacewatch	NYS	1.1 km	MPC · JPL
484624	2008 SM_{143}	—	September 24, 2008	Mount Lemmon	Mount Lemmon Survey	·	930 m	MPC · JPL
484625	2008 SA_{144}	—	September 24, 2008	Mount Lemmon	Mount Lemmon Survey	H	420 m	MPC · JPL
484626	2008 SC_{145}	—	September 26, 2008	Mount Lemmon	Mount Lemmon Survey	URS	3.5 km	MPC · JPL
484627	2008 SA_{159}	—	September 3, 2008	Kitt Peak	Spacewatch	·	3.0 km	MPC · JPL
484628	2008 SS_{164}	—	September 28, 2008	Socorro	LINEAR	PHO	860 m	MPC · JPL
484629	2008 SS_{166}	—	September 4, 2008	Kitt Peak	Spacewatch	CYB	3.7 km	MPC · JPL
484630	2008 ST_{166}	—	September 28, 2008	Socorro	LINEAR	·	1.0 km	MPC · JPL
484631	2008 SL_{190}	—	September 9, 2008	Mount Lemmon	Mount Lemmon Survey	·	1.1 km	MPC · JPL
484632	2008 SN_{193}	—	September 21, 2008	Kitt Peak	Spacewatch	·	900 m	MPC · JPL
484633	2008 SV_{201}	—	September 7, 2008	Mount Lemmon	Mount Lemmon Survey	·	1.0 km	MPC · JPL
484634	2008 SY_{214}	—	September 6, 2008	Kitt Peak	Spacewatch	·	2.9 km	MPC · JPL
484635	2008 SX_{225}	—	September 26, 2008	Kitt Peak	Spacewatch	PHO	960 m	MPC · JPL
484636	2008 SW_{230}	—	September 5, 2008	Kitt Peak	Spacewatch	PHO	960 m	MPC · JPL
484637	2008 SG_{234}	—	September 28, 2008	Mount Lemmon	Mount Lemmon Survey	·	730 m	MPC · JPL
484638	2008 SV_{281}	—	September 23, 2008	Mount Lemmon	Mount Lemmon Survey	·	1.0 km	MPC · JPL
484639	2008 SX_{284}	—	September 25, 2008	Kitt Peak	Spacewatch	·	920 m	MPC · JPL
484640	2008 SW_{290}	—	September 23, 2008	Kitt Peak	Spacewatch	·	2.9 km	MPC · JPL
484641	2008 SG_{303}	—	March 10, 2007	Mount Lemmon	Mount Lemmon Survey	·	740 m	MPC · JPL
484642	2008 SY_{304}	—	September 25, 2008	Kitt Peak	Spacewatch	CYB	3.9 km	MPC · JPL
484643	2008 SE_{306}	—	September 28, 2008	Socorro	LINEAR	H	500 m	MPC · JPL
484644	2008 SW_{307}	—	September 29, 2008	Catalina	CSS	·	1.1 km	MPC · JPL
484645	2008 SA_{310}	—	September 29, 2008	Mount Lemmon	Mount Lemmon Survey	NYS	1.0 km	MPC · JPL
484646	2008 TY_{5}	—	October 3, 2008	Kitt Peak	Spacewatch	V	650 m	MPC · JPL
484647	2008 TP_{11}	—	October 1, 2008	Goodricke-Pigott	R. A. Tucker	·	1.2 km	MPC · JPL
484648	2008 TY_{13}	—	October 1, 2008	Mount Lemmon	Mount Lemmon Survey	V	510 m	MPC · JPL
484649	2008 TY_{31}	—	October 1, 2008	Kitt Peak	Spacewatch	NYS	830 m	MPC · JPL
484650	2008 TS_{47}	—	October 1, 2008	Kitt Peak	Spacewatch	·	1.1 km	MPC · JPL
484651	2008 TV_{64}	—	September 5, 2008	Kitt Peak	Spacewatch	·	840 m	MPC · JPL
484652	2008 TG_{90}	—	October 3, 2008	Kitt Peak	Spacewatch	·	1.1 km	MPC · JPL
484653	2008 TR_{91}	—	September 23, 2008	Kitt Peak	Spacewatch	·	1.1 km	MPC · JPL
484654	2008 TS_{92}	—	September 2, 2008	Kitt Peak	Spacewatch	·	910 m	MPC · JPL
484655	2008 TA_{109}	—	September 23, 2008	Mount Lemmon	Mount Lemmon Survey	·	660 m	MPC · JPL
484656	2008 TH_{113}	—	October 6, 2008	Kitt Peak	Spacewatch	MAS	670 m	MPC · JPL
484657	2008 TL_{140}	—	September 2, 2008	Kitt Peak	Spacewatch	·	4.2 km	MPC · JPL
484658	2008 TH_{150}	—	September 19, 2008	Kitt Peak	Spacewatch	MAS	600 m	MPC · JPL
484659	2008 TD_{162}	—	October 10, 2008	Kitt Peak	Spacewatch	NYS	1.0 km	MPC · JPL
484660	2008 TE_{171}	—	October 10, 2008	Kitt Peak	Spacewatch	MAS	650 m	MPC · JPL
484661	2008 UK_{12}	—	September 24, 2008	Mount Lemmon	Mount Lemmon Survey	V	570 m	MPC · JPL
484662	2008 UT_{18}	—	October 6, 2008	Kitt Peak	Spacewatch	V	490 m	MPC · JPL
484663	2008 UC_{22}	—	September 22, 2008	Mount Lemmon	Mount Lemmon Survey	·	780 m	MPC · JPL
484664	2008 UE_{26}	—	September 9, 2008	Mount Lemmon	Mount Lemmon Survey	CYB	3.2 km	MPC · JPL
484665	2008 UL_{26}	—	October 20, 2008	Mount Lemmon	Mount Lemmon Survey	MAS	560 m	MPC · JPL
484666	2008 UT_{37}	—	October 20, 2008	Kitt Peak	Spacewatch	ERI	1.6 km	MPC · JPL
484667	2008 UM_{52}	—	October 20, 2008	Kitt Peak	Spacewatch	·	890 m	MPC · JPL
484668	2008 UT_{64}	—	October 21, 2008	Kitt Peak	Spacewatch	·	1.2 km	MPC · JPL
484669	2008 UN_{93}	—	September 29, 2008	Catalina	CSS	PHO	960 m	MPC · JPL
484670	2008 UQ_{99}	—	October 22, 2008	Kitt Peak	Spacewatch	·	1.0 km	MPC · JPL
484671	2008 UZ_{99}	—	October 2, 2008	Kitt Peak	Spacewatch	CYB	3.7 km	MPC · JPL
484672	2008 UB_{101}	—	October 20, 2008	Kitt Peak	Spacewatch	·	650 m	MPC · JPL
484673	2008 UM_{103}	—	September 9, 2008	Mount Lemmon	Mount Lemmon Survey	·	1.2 km	MPC · JPL
484674	2008 UW_{114}	—	October 22, 2008	Kitt Peak	Spacewatch	·	1.4 km	MPC · JPL
484675	2008 UQ_{119}	—	October 22, 2008	Kitt Peak	Spacewatch	V	550 m	MPC · JPL
484676	2008 UN_{135}	—	October 23, 2008	Kitt Peak	Spacewatch	·	930 m	MPC · JPL
484677	2008 UD_{155}	—	October 23, 2008	Mount Lemmon	Mount Lemmon Survey	·	840 m	MPC · JPL
484678	2008 UD_{158}	—	October 23, 2008	Mount Lemmon	Mount Lemmon Survey	NYS	1.1 km	MPC · JPL
484679	2008 UT_{162}	—	October 24, 2008	Kitt Peak	Spacewatch	CYB	3.3 km	MPC · JPL
484680	2008 UV_{168}	—	October 6, 2008	Mount Lemmon	Mount Lemmon Survey	·	1.1 km	MPC · JPL
484681	2008 UY_{175}	—	October 24, 2008	Mount Lemmon	Mount Lemmon Survey	·	1.4 km	MPC · JPL
484682	2008 UO_{185}	—	October 24, 2008	Kitt Peak	Spacewatch	MAS	710 m	MPC · JPL
484683	2008 UF_{200}	—	September 24, 2008	Kitt Peak	Spacewatch	NYS	1.1 km	MPC · JPL
484684	2008 UO_{208}	—	October 23, 2008	Kitt Peak	Spacewatch	NYS	820 m	MPC · JPL
484685	2008 UB_{211}	—	October 23, 2008	Kitt Peak	Spacewatch	NYS	890 m	MPC · JPL
484686	2008 UX_{212}	—	October 24, 2008	Kitt Peak	Spacewatch	·	1.1 km	MPC · JPL
484687	2008 UX_{217}	—	October 25, 2008	Kitt Peak	Spacewatch	·	1.1 km	MPC · JPL
484688	2008 UF_{222}	—	October 25, 2008	Kitt Peak	Spacewatch	·	890 m	MPC · JPL
484689	2008 UG_{223}	—	October 25, 2008	Kitt Peak	Spacewatch	·	1.1 km	MPC · JPL
484690	2008 UM_{223}	—	October 25, 2008	Kitt Peak	Spacewatch	CYB	4.6 km	MPC · JPL
484691	2008 UU_{224}	—	October 25, 2008	Kitt Peak	Spacewatch	·	1 km	MPC · JPL
484692	2008 UZ_{228}	—	October 25, 2008	Kitt Peak	Spacewatch	·	1.1 km	MPC · JPL
484693	2008 UY_{250}	—	October 27, 2008	Kitt Peak	Spacewatch	·	790 m	MPC · JPL
484694	2008 UO_{264}	—	October 28, 2008	Kitt Peak	Spacewatch	·	1.0 km	MPC · JPL
484695	2008 UU_{267}	—	October 28, 2008	Kitt Peak	Spacewatch	·	970 m	MPC · JPL
484696	2008 UJ_{269}	—	October 28, 2008	Kitt Peak	Spacewatch	(29841)	1.3 km	MPC · JPL
484697	2008 UN_{275}	—	October 28, 2008	Kitt Peak	Spacewatch	V	590 m	MPC · JPL
484698	2008 UE_{284}	—	October 20, 2008	Kitt Peak	Spacewatch	·	1.2 km	MPC · JPL
484699	2008 UF_{292}	—	February 24, 2006	Kitt Peak	Spacewatch	·	840 m	MPC · JPL
484700	2008 UT_{297}	—	October 29, 2008	Kitt Peak	Spacewatch	·	1.0 km	MPC · JPL

== 484701–484800 ==
back to top

Designation			Discovery			Properties		Ref
Permanent	Provisional	Named after	Date	Site	Discoverer(s)	Category	Diam.	Ref
484701	2008 UE_{313}	—	October 30, 2008	Catalina	CSS	·	1.3 km	MPC · JPL
484702	2008 UB_{340}	—	October 23, 2008	Kitt Peak	Spacewatch	NYS	920 m	MPC · JPL
484703	2008 UN_{343}	—	October 20, 2008	Kitt Peak	Spacewatch	·	960 m	MPC · JPL
484704	2008 UA_{344}	—	October 25, 2008	Mount Lemmon	Mount Lemmon Survey	V	550 m	MPC · JPL
484705	2008 UF_{345}	—	October 31, 2008	Kitt Peak	Spacewatch	MAS	490 m	MPC · JPL
484706	2008 UA_{351}	—	October 26, 2008	Kitt Peak	Spacewatch	·	1.1 km	MPC · JPL
484707	2008 UG_{368}	—	October 31, 2008	Catalina	CSS	·	1.1 km	MPC · JPL
484708	2008 VW_{31}	—	November 2, 2008	Mount Lemmon	Mount Lemmon Survey	·	1.0 km	MPC · JPL
484709	2008 VW_{38}	—	November 2, 2008	Kitt Peak	Spacewatch	NYS	1.0 km	MPC · JPL
484710	2008 VR_{61}	—	October 29, 2008	Mount Lemmon	Mount Lemmon Survey	H	410 m	MPC · JPL
484711	2008 WU_{2}	—	November 18, 2008	Dauban	Kugel, F.	·	1.0 km	MPC · JPL
484712	2008 WV_{2}	—	November 19, 2008	Desert Moon	Stevens, B. L.	·	2.3 km	MPC · JPL
484713	2008 WC_{11}	—	September 22, 2008	Mount Lemmon	Mount Lemmon Survey	·	1.1 km	MPC · JPL
484714	2008 WM_{12}	—	October 20, 2008	Kitt Peak	Spacewatch	H	430 m	MPC · JPL
484715	2008 WT_{18}	—	November 17, 2008	Kitt Peak	Spacewatch	MAS	550 m	MPC · JPL
484716	2008 WO_{24}	—	November 18, 2008	Kitt Peak	Spacewatch	·	1.2 km	MPC · JPL
484717	2008 WM_{48}	—	November 17, 2008	Kitt Peak	Spacewatch	·	1.3 km	MPC · JPL
484718	2008 WP_{61}	—	October 28, 2008	Kitt Peak	Spacewatch	·	1.2 km	MPC · JPL
484719	2008 WJ_{72}	—	November 19, 2008	Kitt Peak	Spacewatch	H	520 m	MPC · JPL
484720	2008 WZ_{83}	—	November 20, 2008	Mount Lemmon	Mount Lemmon Survey	·	1.6 km	MPC · JPL
484721	2008 WB_{121}	—	November 30, 2008	Kitt Peak	Spacewatch	MAS	710 m	MPC · JPL
484722	2008 WX_{134}	—	November 30, 2008	Catalina	CSS	H	550 m	MPC · JPL
484723	2008 WO_{135}	—	November 18, 2008	Socorro	LINEAR	·	1.3 km	MPC · JPL
484724	2008 XG_{2}	—	March 20, 2004	Siding Spring	SSS	H	530 m	MPC · JPL
484725	2008 XP_{2}	—	December 5, 2008	Catalina	CSS	AMO	770 m	MPC · JPL
484726	2008 XE_{7}	—	December 9, 2008	Great Shefford	Birtwhistle, P.	·	1.1 km	MPC · JPL
484727	2008 XU_{15}	—	December 3, 2008	Mount Lemmon	Mount Lemmon Survey	MAS	670 m	MPC · JPL
484728	2008 XQ_{37}	—	November 19, 2008	Kitt Peak	Spacewatch	·	960 m	MPC · JPL
484729	2008 XW_{39}	—	December 2, 2008	Kitt Peak	Spacewatch	·	930 m	MPC · JPL
484730	2008 XX_{42}	—	December 2, 2008	Mount Lemmon	Mount Lemmon Survey	H	480 m	MPC · JPL
484731	2008 XU_{51}	—	November 19, 2008	Kitt Peak	Spacewatch	·	1.2 km	MPC · JPL
484732	2008 XE_{53}	—	December 4, 2008	Mount Lemmon	Mount Lemmon Survey	·	1.9 km	MPC · JPL
484733	2008 XF_{53}	—	December 5, 2008	Mount Lemmon	Mount Lemmon Survey	H	460 m	MPC · JPL
484734 Chienshu	2008 YX_{9}	Chienshu	December 19, 2008	Lulin	X. Y. Hsiao, Q. Ye	RAF	1.1 km	MPC · JPL
484735	2008 YP_{24}	—	November 7, 2008	Mount Lemmon	Mount Lemmon Survey	·	1.3 km	MPC · JPL
484736	2008 YW_{29}	—	November 24, 2008	Mount Lemmon	Mount Lemmon Survey	MAS	780 m	MPC · JPL
484737	2008 YK_{31}	—	November 23, 2008	Mount Lemmon	Mount Lemmon Survey	EUN	1.0 km	MPC · JPL
484738	2008 YG_{37}	—	December 22, 2008	Mount Lemmon	Mount Lemmon Survey	·	1.6 km	MPC · JPL
484739	2008 YJ_{66}	—	December 4, 2008	Mount Lemmon	Mount Lemmon Survey	·	1.1 km	MPC · JPL
484740	2008 YH_{71}	—	December 29, 2008	Kitt Peak	Spacewatch	NYS	960 m	MPC · JPL
484741	2008 YZ_{91}	—	December 21, 2008	Kitt Peak	Spacewatch	·	1.1 km	MPC · JPL
484742	2008 YX_{100}	—	December 29, 2008	Kitt Peak	Spacewatch	·	1.2 km	MPC · JPL
484743	2008 YL_{101}	—	December 21, 2008	Kitt Peak	Spacewatch	PHO	810 m	MPC · JPL
484744	2008 YA_{106}	—	December 29, 2008	Kitt Peak	Spacewatch	·	740 m	MPC · JPL
484745	2008 YG_{118}	—	December 21, 2008	Catalina	CSS	H	620 m	MPC · JPL
484746	2008 YS_{132}	—	December 31, 2008	Kitt Peak	Spacewatch	·	1.0 km	MPC · JPL
484747	2008 YW_{143}	—	December 30, 2008	Kitt Peak	Spacewatch	NYS	1.1 km	MPC · JPL
484748	2008 YT_{145}	—	December 30, 2008	Kitt Peak	Spacewatch	·	910 m	MPC · JPL
484749	2008 YB_{146}	—	December 30, 2008	Kitt Peak	Spacewatch	·	890 m	MPC · JPL
484750	2008 YO_{150}	—	December 22, 2008	Kitt Peak	Spacewatch	·	1.0 km	MPC · JPL
484751	2008 YT_{154}	—	December 22, 2008	Kitt Peak	Spacewatch	·	1.0 km	MPC · JPL
484752	2008 YC_{159}	—	December 31, 2008	Kitt Peak	Spacewatch	·	1.4 km	MPC · JPL
484753	2008 YN_{160}	—	December 29, 2008	Mount Lemmon	Mount Lemmon Survey	H	460 m	MPC · JPL
484754	2008 YZ_{168}	—	December 22, 2008	Kitt Peak	Spacewatch	·	1.1 km	MPC · JPL
484755	2009 AH_{10}	—	January 2, 2009	Mount Lemmon	Mount Lemmon Survey	·	1.5 km	MPC · JPL
484756	2009 AR_{27}	—	December 22, 2008	Kitt Peak	Spacewatch	H	480 m	MPC · JPL
484757	2009 BL_{2}	—	January 18, 2009	Socorro	LINEAR	APO	440 m	MPC · JPL
484758	2009 BW_{29}	—	January 16, 2009	Kitt Peak	Spacewatch	EUN	1.0 km	MPC · JPL
484759	2009 BB_{35}	—	January 1, 2009	Mount Lemmon	Mount Lemmon Survey	·	1.0 km	MPC · JPL
484760	2009 BP_{37}	—	December 22, 2008	Mount Lemmon	Mount Lemmon Survey	·	810 m	MPC · JPL
484761	2009 BA_{43}	—	January 16, 2009	Kitt Peak	Spacewatch	·	1.5 km	MPC · JPL
484762	2009 BL_{49}	—	December 22, 2008	Kitt Peak	Spacewatch	·	950 m	MPC · JPL
484763	2009 BS_{49}	—	January 16, 2009	Mount Lemmon	Mount Lemmon Survey	NYS	1.1 km	MPC · JPL
484764	2009 BZ_{50}	—	January 2, 2009	Mount Lemmon	Mount Lemmon Survey	·	1.4 km	MPC · JPL
484765	2009 BL_{51}	—	January 16, 2009	Kitt Peak	Spacewatch	·	1.1 km	MPC · JPL
484766	2009 BC_{61}	—	November 20, 2008	Mount Lemmon	Mount Lemmon Survey	H	550 m	MPC · JPL
484767	2009 BQ_{66}	—	January 20, 2009	Kitt Peak	Spacewatch	·	1.1 km	MPC · JPL
484768	2009 BJ_{68}	—	January 20, 2009	Kitt Peak	Spacewatch	·	800 m	MPC · JPL
484769	2009 BT_{114}	—	January 16, 2009	Kitt Peak	Spacewatch	·	1.8 km	MPC · JPL
484770	2009 BK_{126}	—	January 15, 2009	Kitt Peak	Spacewatch	·	1.2 km	MPC · JPL
484771	2009 BH_{143}	—	January 30, 2009	Kitt Peak	Spacewatch	RAF	840 m	MPC · JPL
484772	2009 BT_{149}	—	March 11, 2005	Mount Lemmon	Mount Lemmon Survey	·	1.1 km	MPC · JPL
484773	2009 BY_{154}	—	January 20, 2009	Kitt Peak	Spacewatch	NYS	960 m	MPC · JPL
484774	2009 BV_{156}	—	January 31, 2009	Kitt Peak	Spacewatch	·	740 m	MPC · JPL
484775	2009 BH_{158}	—	January 31, 2009	Kitt Peak	Spacewatch	·	1.1 km	MPC · JPL
484776	2009 BC_{159}	—	January 31, 2009	Kitt Peak	Spacewatch	·	1.2 km	MPC · JPL
484777	2009 BJ_{162}	—	January 20, 2009	Kitt Peak	Spacewatch	·	860 m	MPC · JPL
484778	2009 BD_{166}	—	January 20, 2009	Kitt Peak	Spacewatch	(5)	810 m	MPC · JPL
484779	2009 BY_{171}	—	January 17, 2009	Kitt Peak	Spacewatch	·	1.1 km	MPC · JPL
484780	2009 BU_{175}	—	January 29, 2009	Catalina	CSS	H	430 m	MPC · JPL
484781	2009 BY_{177}	—	January 31, 2009	Mount Lemmon	Mount Lemmon Survey	H	460 m	MPC · JPL
484782	2009 BQ_{185}	—	January 20, 2009	Mount Lemmon	Mount Lemmon Survey	·	1.0 km	MPC · JPL
484783	2009 CJ	—	February 2, 2009	Mount Lemmon	Mount Lemmon Survey	H	570 m	MPC · JPL
484784	2009 CL_{7}	—	February 1, 2009	Catalina	CSS	H	640 m	MPC · JPL
484785	2009 CR_{15}	—	February 3, 2009	Mount Lemmon	Mount Lemmon Survey	MAR	820 m	MPC · JPL
484786	2009 CC_{20}	—	February 1, 2009	Mount Lemmon	Mount Lemmon Survey	·	1.1 km	MPC · JPL
484787	2009 CC_{30}	—	February 1, 2009	Kitt Peak	Spacewatch	H	480 m	MPC · JPL
484788	2009 CO_{36}	—	February 3, 2009	Kitt Peak	Spacewatch	·	810 m	MPC · JPL
484789	2009 CH_{41}	—	February 3, 2009	Kitt Peak	Spacewatch	·	930 m	MPC · JPL
484790	2009 CC_{53}	—	January 25, 2009	Kitt Peak	Spacewatch	ADE	1.7 km	MPC · JPL
484791	2009 DS	—	February 18, 2009	Taunus	E. Schwab, R. Kling	KON	2.2 km	MPC · JPL
484792	2009 DD_{2}	—	February 16, 2009	Dauban	Kugel, F.	·	1.2 km	MPC · JPL
484793	2009 DZ_{23}	—	February 4, 2009	Mount Lemmon	Mount Lemmon Survey	H	510 m	MPC · JPL
484794	2009 DC_{36}	—	February 21, 2009	Kitt Peak	Spacewatch	·	870 m	MPC · JPL
484795	2009 DE_{47}	—	February 28, 2009	Socorro	LINEAR	APO	690 m	MPC · JPL
484796	2009 DM_{75}	—	January 18, 2009	Mount Lemmon	Mount Lemmon Survey	·	1.4 km	MPC · JPL
484797	2009 DU_{77}	—	February 24, 2009	La Sagra	OAM	·	1.2 km	MPC · JPL
484798	2009 DZ_{79}	—	January 18, 2009	Mount Lemmon	Mount Lemmon Survey	·	1.9 km	MPC · JPL
484799	2009 DL_{87}	—	February 27, 2009	Catalina	CSS	·	1.4 km	MPC · JPL
484800	2009 DJ_{88}	—	November 24, 2008	Mount Lemmon	Mount Lemmon Survey	·	1.7 km	MPC · JPL

== 484801–484900 ==
back to top

Designation			Discovery			Properties		Ref
Permanent	Provisional	Named after	Date	Site	Discoverer(s)	Category	Diam.	Ref
484801	2009 DU_{90}	—	February 26, 2009	Kitt Peak	Spacewatch	·	890 m	MPC · JPL
484802	2009 DU_{124}	—	February 19, 2009	Kitt Peak	Spacewatch	·	1.1 km	MPC · JPL
484803	2009 DT_{125}	—	February 19, 2009	Kitt Peak	Spacewatch	·	1.0 km	MPC · JPL
484804	2009 DS_{126}	—	February 20, 2009	Kitt Peak	Spacewatch	MAR	1.2 km	MPC · JPL
484805	2009 DE_{127}	—	February 20, 2009	Kitt Peak	Spacewatch	H	430 m	MPC · JPL
484806	2009 DP_{131}	—	February 19, 2009	Kitt Peak	Spacewatch	·	760 m	MPC · JPL
484807	2009 DO_{134}	—	February 20, 2009	Mount Lemmon	Mount Lemmon Survey	·	990 m	MPC · JPL
484808	2009 DW_{134}	—	February 19, 2009	Kitt Peak	Spacewatch	·	930 m	MPC · JPL
484809	2009 ER_{10}	—	March 1, 2009	Kitt Peak	Spacewatch	·	1.1 km	MPC · JPL
484810	2009 EL_{11}	—	March 2, 2009	Mount Lemmon	Mount Lemmon Survey	EUN	1.2 km	MPC · JPL
484811	2009 EW_{18}	—	February 19, 2009	Kitt Peak	Spacewatch	·	720 m	MPC · JPL
484812	2009 EM_{23}	—	March 15, 2009	Kitt Peak	Spacewatch	·	1.5 km	MPC · JPL
484813	2009 EF_{24}	—	March 1, 2009	Kitt Peak	Spacewatch	·	1.1 km	MPC · JPL
484814	2009 FS_{1}	—	March 17, 2009	La Sagra	OAM	H	520 m	MPC · JPL
484815	2009 FC_{25}	—	March 22, 2009	La Sagra	OAM	·	1.9 km	MPC · JPL
484816	2009 FY_{27}	—	March 22, 2009	Catalina	CSS	JUN	1.0 km	MPC · JPL
484817	2009 FF_{30}	—	March 1, 2009	Kitt Peak	Spacewatch	·	1.0 km	MPC · JPL
484818	2009 FW_{34}	—	March 24, 2009	Mount Lemmon	Mount Lemmon Survey	·	1.0 km	MPC · JPL
484819	2009 FD_{52}	—	March 28, 2009	Mount Lemmon	Mount Lemmon Survey	GEF	1.2 km	MPC · JPL
484820	2009 FH_{54}	—	March 29, 2009	Mount Lemmon	Mount Lemmon Survey	·	1.5 km	MPC · JPL
484821	2009 FF_{57}	—	March 21, 2009	Kitt Peak	Spacewatch	KON	1.8 km	MPC · JPL
484822	2009 FZ_{69}	—	March 18, 2009	Kitt Peak	Spacewatch	·	1.4 km	MPC · JPL
484823	2009 FN_{73}	—	March 24, 2009	Mount Lemmon	Mount Lemmon Survey	·	1.0 km	MPC · JPL
484824	2009 FS_{76}	—	March 18, 2009	Mount Lemmon	Mount Lemmon Survey	·	1.2 km	MPC · JPL
484825	2009 GP_{3}	—	April 15, 2009	Siding Spring	SSS	·	990 m	MPC · JPL
484826	2009 GY_{4}	—	April 2, 2009	Kitt Peak	Spacewatch	·	1.0 km	MPC · JPL
484827	2009 GE_{5}	—	April 2, 2009	Catalina	CSS	H	590 m	MPC · JPL
484828	2009 HM_{3}	—	April 17, 2009	Kitt Peak	Spacewatch	(5)	860 m	MPC · JPL
484829	2009 HQ_{3}	—	April 2, 2009	Mount Lemmon	Mount Lemmon Survey	·	1.3 km	MPC · JPL
484830	2009 HD_{4}	—	March 18, 2009	Catalina	CSS	H	570 m	MPC · JPL
484831	2009 HL_{6}	—	April 17, 2009	Kitt Peak	Spacewatch	·	920 m	MPC · JPL
484832	2009 HZ_{6}	—	April 17, 2009	Kitt Peak	Spacewatch	·	1.5 km	MPC · JPL
484833	2009 HS_{8}	—	April 2, 2009	Mount Lemmon	Mount Lemmon Survey	·	1.3 km	MPC · JPL
484834	2009 HC_{24}	—	April 17, 2009	Kitt Peak	Spacewatch	·	1.6 km	MPC · JPL
484835	2009 HX_{39}	—	March 24, 2009	Mount Lemmon	Mount Lemmon Survey	·	1.1 km	MPC · JPL
484836	2009 HD_{41}	—	April 20, 2009	Kitt Peak	Spacewatch	·	1.6 km	MPC · JPL
484837	2009 HM_{48}	—	March 24, 2009	Mount Lemmon	Mount Lemmon Survey	·	2.2 km	MPC · JPL
484838	2009 HE_{50}	—	April 21, 2009	Kitt Peak	Spacewatch	·	1.2 km	MPC · JPL
484839	2009 HN_{59}	—	April 17, 2009	Kitt Peak	Spacewatch	·	1.1 km	MPC · JPL
484840	2009 HU_{61}	—	April 20, 2009	Mount Lemmon	Mount Lemmon Survey	·	1.0 km	MPC · JPL
484841	2009 HL_{62}	—	April 2, 2009	Mount Lemmon	Mount Lemmon Survey	H	500 m	MPC · JPL
484842	2009 HS_{62}	—	April 22, 2009	Kitt Peak	Spacewatch	ADE	1.5 km	MPC · JPL
484843	2009 HB_{66}	—	April 23, 2009	Kitt Peak	Spacewatch	·	1.2 km	MPC · JPL
484844	2009 HL_{68}	—	April 22, 2009	Mount Lemmon	Mount Lemmon Survey	·	950 m	MPC · JPL
484845	2009 HA_{73}	—	April 2, 2009	Kitt Peak	Spacewatch	H	550 m	MPC · JPL
484846	2009 HO_{76}	—	April 19, 2009	Mount Lemmon	Mount Lemmon Survey	·	1.1 km	MPC · JPL
484847	2009 HE_{81}	—	March 25, 2009	Mount Lemmon	Mount Lemmon Survey	·	1.2 km	MPC · JPL
484848	2009 HG_{83}	—	April 19, 2009	Kitt Peak	Spacewatch	·	2.0 km	MPC · JPL
484849	2009 HK_{85}	—	April 18, 2009	Kitt Peak	Spacewatch	·	1.5 km	MPC · JPL
484850	2009 HF_{88}	—	April 30, 2009	Kitt Peak	Spacewatch	AMO	470 m	MPC · JPL
484851	2009 HP_{89}	—	April 21, 2009	Kitt Peak	Spacewatch	·	1.5 km	MPC · JPL
484852	2009 HQ_{93}	—	March 31, 2009	Mount Lemmon	Mount Lemmon Survey	·	1.0 km	MPC · JPL
484853	2009 HT_{96}	—	April 27, 2009	Kitt Peak	Spacewatch	·	1.8 km	MPC · JPL
484854	2009 HE_{100}	—	April 27, 2009	Kitt Peak	Spacewatch	·	1.0 km	MPC · JPL
484855	2009 HL_{102}	—	April 21, 2009	Mount Lemmon	Mount Lemmon Survey	·	1.2 km	MPC · JPL
484856	2009 JF_{3}	—	April 24, 2009	Kitt Peak	Spacewatch	EUN	1.1 km	MPC · JPL
484857	2009 JP_{4}	—	May 13, 2009	Kitt Peak	Spacewatch	·	1.8 km	MPC · JPL
484858	2009 JK_{5}	—	February 20, 2009	Mount Lemmon	Mount Lemmon Survey	EUN	990 m	MPC · JPL
484859	2009 JE_{13}	—	May 4, 2009	Mount Lemmon	Mount Lemmon Survey	·	1.3 km	MPC · JPL
484860	2009 JQ_{15}	—	December 3, 2008	Mount Lemmon	Mount Lemmon Survey	·	1.8 km	MPC · JPL
484861	2009 KL_{7}	—	May 26, 2009	Siding Spring	SSS	·	1.7 km	MPC · JPL
484862	2009 KZ_{8}	—	May 24, 2009	Catalina	CSS	·	1.8 km	MPC · JPL
484863	2009 KA_{26}	—	May 1, 2009	Kitt Peak	Spacewatch	·	1.7 km	MPC · JPL
484864	2009 LH_{1}	—	April 22, 2009	Mount Lemmon	Mount Lemmon Survey	·	1.2 km	MPC · JPL
484865	2009 NJ_{2}	—	July 12, 2009	Kitt Peak	Spacewatch	BRA	1.7 km	MPC · JPL
484866	2009 ON	—	July 16, 2009	La Sagra	OAM	·	2.7 km	MPC · JPL
484867	2009 OD_{6}	—	July 19, 2009	La Sagra	OAM	JUN	920 m	MPC · JPL
484868	2009 OP_{8}	—	July 25, 2009	La Sagra	OAM	·	3.7 km	MPC · JPL
484869	2009 OH_{9}	—	July 28, 2009	Kitt Peak	Spacewatch	·	3.2 km	MPC · JPL
484870	2009 OU_{13}	—	July 27, 2009	Catalina	CSS	JUN	1.0 km	MPC · JPL
484871	2009 OB_{20}	—	July 30, 2009	Catalina	CSS	·	3.8 km	MPC · JPL
484872	2009 OH_{21}	—	July 28, 2009	Catalina	CSS	·	2.7 km	MPC · JPL
484873	2009 OD_{24}	—	July 28, 2009	Kitt Peak	Spacewatch	·	2.7 km	MPC · JPL
484874	2009 PW	—	July 14, 2009	Kitt Peak	Spacewatch	·	1.8 km	MPC · JPL
484875	2009 PL_{2}	—	July 28, 2009	Kitt Peak	Spacewatch	·	3.1 km	MPC · JPL
484876	2009 PF_{4}	—	August 14, 2009	La Sagra	OAM	·	2.2 km	MPC · JPL
484877	2009 PB_{5}	—	August 15, 2009	Catalina	CSS	·	2.9 km	MPC · JPL
484878	2009 PB_{19}	—	August 15, 2009	Kitt Peak	Spacewatch	·	2.1 km	MPC · JPL
484879	2009 PD_{19}	—	August 15, 2009	Kitt Peak	Spacewatch	·	2.6 km	MPC · JPL
484880	2009 QE_{12}	—	August 16, 2009	Kitt Peak	Spacewatch	·	2.0 km	MPC · JPL
484881	2009 QF_{14}	—	August 16, 2009	Kitt Peak	Spacewatch	·	1.7 km	MPC · JPL
484882	2009 QQ_{31}	—	August 21, 2009	La Sagra	OAM	·	3.7 km	MPC · JPL
484883	2009 QH_{33}	—	August 24, 2009	La Sagra	OAM	·	3.5 km	MPC · JPL
484884	2009 QT_{34}	—	August 28, 2009	La Sagra	OAM	·	1.8 km	MPC · JPL
484885	2009 QT_{40}	—	August 26, 2009	La Sagra	OAM	·	3.9 km	MPC · JPL
484886	2009 QK_{41}	—	August 20, 2009	La Sagra	OAM	EOS	1.5 km	MPC · JPL
484887	2009 QH_{42}	—	August 26, 2009	La Sagra	OAM	·	3.0 km	MPC · JPL
484888	2009 QY_{46}	—	August 28, 2009	La Sagra	OAM	EOS	2.0 km	MPC · JPL
484889	2009 QE_{48}	—	August 28, 2009	La Sagra	OAM	·	3.4 km	MPC · JPL
484890	2009 QR_{56}	—	August 27, 2009	La Sagra	OAM	·	3.0 km	MPC · JPL
484891	2009 QQ_{58}	—	August 16, 2009	Kitt Peak	Spacewatch	·	2.4 km	MPC · JPL
484892	2009 QG_{59}	—	August 29, 2009	La Sagra	OAM	·	3.2 km	MPC · JPL
484893	2009 QP_{59}	—	August 16, 2009	Catalina	CSS	·	3.4 km	MPC · JPL
484894	2009 QM_{60}	—	August 17, 2009	Catalina	CSS	·	3.2 km	MPC · JPL
484895	2009 QE_{64}	—	August 19, 2009	La Sagra	OAM	·	1.6 km	MPC · JPL
484896	2009 RC_{1}	—	August 29, 2009	La Sagra	OAM	·	4.5 km	MPC · JPL
484897	2009 RJ_{1}	—	August 28, 2009	Catalina	CSS	·	2.9 km	MPC · JPL
484898	2009 RL_{7}	—	September 10, 2009	La Sagra	OAM	TIR	3.7 km	MPC · JPL
484899	2009 RA_{9}	—	September 12, 2009	Kitt Peak	Spacewatch	EOS	1.8 km	MPC · JPL
484900	2009 RJ_{9}	—	September 12, 2009	Kitt Peak	Spacewatch	·	2.6 km	MPC · JPL

== 484901–485000 ==
back to top

Designation			Discovery			Properties		Ref
Permanent	Provisional	Named after	Date	Site	Discoverer(s)	Category	Diam.	Ref
484901	2009 RH_{15}	—	September 12, 2009	Kitt Peak	Spacewatch	·	2.3 km	MPC · JPL
484902	2009 RM_{16}	—	September 12, 2009	Kitt Peak	Spacewatch	(31811)	2.2 km	MPC · JPL
484903	2009 RD_{34}	—	September 14, 2009	Kitt Peak	Spacewatch	·	3.3 km	MPC · JPL
484904	2009 RL_{37}	—	September 15, 2009	Kitt Peak	Spacewatch	·	3.1 km	MPC · JPL
484905	2009 RB_{45}	—	September 15, 2009	Kitt Peak	Spacewatch	CYB	3.6 km	MPC · JPL
484906	2009 RF_{45}	—	September 15, 2009	Kitt Peak	Spacewatch	·	1.6 km	MPC · JPL
484907	2009 RH_{47}	—	September 15, 2009	Kitt Peak	Spacewatch	·	950 m	MPC · JPL
484908	2009 RD_{62}	—	September 14, 2009	Kitt Peak	Spacewatch	·	620 m	MPC · JPL
484909	2009 RF_{62}	—	September 14, 2009	Kitt Peak	Spacewatch	·	610 m	MPC · JPL
484910	2009 RO_{73}	—	September 15, 2009	Kitt Peak	Spacewatch	·	4.4 km	MPC · JPL
484911	2009 SW_{3}	—	August 17, 2009	Kitt Peak	Spacewatch	LIX	3.5 km	MPC · JPL
484912	2009 SJ_{17}	—	August 16, 2009	Catalina	CSS	·	3.0 km	MPC · JPL
484913	2009 SM_{19}	—	September 23, 2009	Mayhill	Lowe, A.	·	940 m	MPC · JPL
484914	2009 SA_{21}	—	August 17, 2009	Kitt Peak	Spacewatch	·	3.6 km	MPC · JPL
484915	2009 SR_{22}	—	July 27, 2009	Kitt Peak	Spacewatch	LIX	2.6 km	MPC · JPL
484916	2009 SH_{26}	—	September 16, 2009	Kitt Peak	Spacewatch	·	3.4 km	MPC · JPL
484917	2009 SF_{29}	—	September 16, 2009	Kitt Peak	Spacewatch	·	2.4 km	MPC · JPL
484918	2009 SM_{42}	—	September 16, 2009	Kitt Peak	Spacewatch	·	3.7 km	MPC · JPL
484919	2009 SH_{51}	—	August 16, 2009	Kitt Peak	Spacewatch	EOS	2.0 km	MPC · JPL
484920	2009 SL_{52}	—	September 17, 2009	Kitt Peak	Spacewatch	·	3.4 km	MPC · JPL
484921	2009 SS_{66}	—	September 17, 2009	Kitt Peak	Spacewatch	·	2.4 km	MPC · JPL
484922	2009 SZ_{71}	—	September 17, 2009	Mount Lemmon	Mount Lemmon Survey	EOS	1.6 km	MPC · JPL
484923	2009 SZ_{76}	—	September 17, 2009	Kitt Peak	Spacewatch	·	4.3 km	MPC · JPL
484924	2009 SO_{99}	—	August 19, 2009	Catalina	CSS	T_{j} (2.99)	3.7 km	MPC · JPL
484925	2009 SB_{103}	—	September 25, 2009	La Sagra	OAM	PHO	1.2 km	MPC · JPL
484926	2009 SV_{108}	—	September 17, 2009	La Sagra	OAM	·	4.1 km	MPC · JPL
484927	2009 SD_{110}	—	September 10, 2009	Catalina	CSS	·	3.6 km	MPC · JPL
484928	2009 SE_{113}	—	September 18, 2009	Kitt Peak	Spacewatch	·	2.3 km	MPC · JPL
484929	2009 ST_{114}	—	February 25, 2007	Kitt Peak	Spacewatch	·	1.6 km	MPC · JPL
484930	2009 SV_{115}	—	September 13, 1998	Kitt Peak	Spacewatch	·	2.0 km	MPC · JPL
484931	2009 SL_{127}	—	September 18, 2009	Kitt Peak	Spacewatch	·	2.3 km	MPC · JPL
484932	2009 SO_{143}	—	September 19, 2009	Kitt Peak	Spacewatch	·	460 m	MPC · JPL
484933	2009 SC_{147}	—	September 19, 2009	Kitt Peak	Spacewatch	EOS	2.4 km	MPC · JPL
484934	2009 SA_{150}	—	August 29, 2009	La Sagra	OAM	LIX	4.0 km	MPC · JPL
484935	2009 SS_{156}	—	September 20, 2009	Kitt Peak	Spacewatch	·	2.1 km	MPC · JPL
484936	2009 SA_{172}	—	September 21, 2009	Mount Lemmon	Mount Lemmon Survey	·	3.2 km	MPC · JPL
484937	2009 SR_{174}	—	August 19, 2009	Kitt Peak	Spacewatch	·	2.8 km	MPC · JPL
484938	2009 SZ_{177}	—	September 12, 2009	Kitt Peak	Spacewatch	·	3.5 km	MPC · JPL
484939	2009 SC_{180}	—	September 20, 2009	Kitt Peak	Spacewatch	·	2.7 km	MPC · JPL
484940	2009 SD_{181}	—	September 21, 2009	Mount Lemmon	Mount Lemmon Survey	·	2.2 km	MPC · JPL
484941	2009 SA_{187}	—	September 21, 2009	Kitt Peak	Spacewatch	EOS	1.9 km	MPC · JPL
484942	2009 ST_{190}	—	January 23, 2006	Kitt Peak	Spacewatch	·	2.2 km	MPC · JPL
484943	2009 SW_{190}	—	September 22, 2009	Kitt Peak	Spacewatch	EOS	1.9 km	MPC · JPL
484944	2009 SM_{220}	—	September 24, 2009	Mount Lemmon	Mount Lemmon Survey	·	2.7 km	MPC · JPL
484945	2009 SL_{240}	—	August 17, 2009	Catalina	CSS	·	2.1 km	MPC · JPL
484946	2009 SN_{261}	—	September 22, 2009	Kitt Peak	Spacewatch	·	520 m	MPC · JPL
484947	2009 SK_{271}	—	September 16, 2009	Kitt Peak	Spacewatch	·	3.8 km	MPC · JPL
484948	2009 SD_{277}	—	September 25, 2009	Kitt Peak	Spacewatch	·	2.1 km	MPC · JPL
484949	2009 SU_{279}	—	September 17, 2004	Kitt Peak	Spacewatch	·	2.5 km	MPC · JPL
484950	2009 SO_{284}	—	September 25, 2009	Catalina	CSS	·	770 m	MPC · JPL
484951	2009 ST_{293}	—	September 15, 2009	Kitt Peak	Spacewatch	·	2.5 km	MPC · JPL
484952	2009 SB_{298}	—	September 28, 2009	Mount Lemmon	Mount Lemmon Survey	EOS	1.8 km	MPC · JPL
484953	2009 SC_{303}	—	September 16, 2009	Mount Lemmon	Mount Lemmon Survey	EOS	1.3 km	MPC · JPL
484954	2009 SO_{320}	—	September 21, 2009	Mount Lemmon	Mount Lemmon Survey	·	2.3 km	MPC · JPL
484955	2009 SC_{337}	—	September 25, 2009	La Sagra	OAM	·	3.7 km	MPC · JPL
484956	2009 SL_{340}	—	September 20, 2009	Kitt Peak	Spacewatch	·	2.5 km	MPC · JPL
484957	2009 SK_{342}	—	September 16, 2009	Kitt Peak	Spacewatch	·	2.4 km	MPC · JPL
484958	2009 SG_{345}	—	September 18, 2009	Kitt Peak	Spacewatch	·	3.0 km	MPC · JPL
484959	2009 SK_{361}	—	September 16, 2009	Catalina	CSS	·	4.7 km	MPC · JPL
484960	2009 TU_{6}	—	October 12, 2009	La Sagra	OAM	·	1.3 km	MPC · JPL
484961	2009 TC_{7}	—	October 12, 2009	La Sagra	OAM	·	2.7 km	MPC · JPL
484962	2009 TJ_{7}	—	October 13, 2009	La Sagra	OAM	EOS	3.0 km	MPC · JPL
484963	2009 TY_{7}	—	October 14, 2009	Mayhill	Lowe, A.	·	990 m	MPC · JPL
484964	2009 TR_{10}	—	September 23, 2009	Kitt Peak	Spacewatch	·	620 m	MPC · JPL
484965	2009 TF_{17}	—	October 15, 2009	La Sagra	OAM	·	590 m	MPC · JPL
484966	2009 TF_{18}	—	August 17, 2009	Kitt Peak	Spacewatch	·	2.1 km	MPC · JPL
484967	2009 TN_{20}	—	October 11, 2009	La Sagra	OAM	·	670 m	MPC · JPL
484968	2009 TY_{30}	—	September 22, 2009	Kitt Peak	Spacewatch	·	1.8 km	MPC · JPL
484969	2009 TE_{32}	—	September 16, 2009	Catalina	CSS	·	3.8 km	MPC · JPL
484970	2009 TV_{37}	—	October 12, 2009	La Sagra	OAM	TIR	3.6 km	MPC · JPL
484971	2009 TY_{37}	—	September 16, 2009	Kitt Peak	Spacewatch	·	580 m	MPC · JPL
484972	2009 TG_{39}	—	September 25, 2009	Catalina	CSS	·	3.2 km	MPC · JPL
484973	2009 TK_{39}	—	October 15, 2009	La Sagra	OAM	·	4.7 km	MPC · JPL
484974	2009 TY_{45}	—	October 15, 2009	Siding Spring	SSS	PHO	1.2 km	MPC · JPL
484975	2009 TX_{46}	—	March 26, 2007	Mount Lemmon	Mount Lemmon Survey	·	3.3 km	MPC · JPL
484976	2009 UN_{3}	—	October 19, 2009	Siding Spring	SSS	APO · PHA	700 m	MPC · JPL
484977	2009 UL_{11}	—	March 15, 2007	Mount Lemmon	Mount Lemmon Survey	·	2.9 km	MPC · JPL
484978	2009 UY_{16}	—	September 26, 2009	Catalina	CSS	·	5.3 km	MPC · JPL
484979	2009 UK_{17}	—	September 29, 2009	Mount Lemmon	Mount Lemmon Survey	EOS	2.1 km	MPC · JPL
484980	2009 UP_{24}	—	October 18, 2009	Mount Lemmon	Mount Lemmon Survey	·	3.8 km	MPC · JPL
484981	2009 UB_{55}	—	December 13, 2006	Kitt Peak	Spacewatch	·	500 m	MPC · JPL
484982	2009 UB_{58}	—	October 23, 2009	Mount Lemmon	Mount Lemmon Survey	·	630 m	MPC · JPL
484983	2009 UZ_{60}	—	September 28, 2009	Mount Lemmon	Mount Lemmon Survey	·	3.4 km	MPC · JPL
484984	2009 UW_{63}	—	September 29, 2009	Kitt Peak	Spacewatch	·	2.7 km	MPC · JPL
484985	2009 UT_{77}	—	October 21, 2009	Mount Lemmon	Mount Lemmon Survey	·	2.6 km	MPC · JPL
484986	2009 UE_{88}	—	October 21, 2009	Catalina	CSS	·	3.6 km	MPC · JPL
484987	2009 UB_{91}	—	September 30, 2009	Mount Lemmon	Mount Lemmon Survey	EOS	2.2 km	MPC · JPL
484988	2009 UL_{98}	—	October 23, 2009	Mount Lemmon	Mount Lemmon Survey	·	3.7 km	MPC · JPL
484989	2009 UM_{103}	—	October 14, 2009	Kitt Peak	Spacewatch	·	570 m	MPC · JPL
484990	2009 UR_{112}	—	October 26, 2009	Kitt Peak	Spacewatch	·	2.5 km	MPC · JPL
484991	2009 UG_{140}	—	October 18, 2009	La Sagra	OAM	·	5.1 km	MPC · JPL
484992	2009 UJ_{147}	—	October 24, 2009	Kitt Peak	Spacewatch	VER	2.4 km	MPC · JPL
484993	2009 UF_{149}	—	October 24, 2009	Kitt Peak	Spacewatch	·	3.2 km	MPC · JPL
484994	2009 VN	—	October 15, 2009	La Sagra	OAM	(8737)	4.6 km	MPC · JPL
484995	2009 VZ_{14}	—	November 8, 2009	Mount Lemmon	Mount Lemmon Survey	·	510 m	MPC · JPL
484996	2009 VK_{18}	—	September 22, 2009	Mount Lemmon	Mount Lemmon Survey	·	3.7 km	MPC · JPL
484997	2009 VC_{19}	—	November 9, 2009	Kitt Peak	Spacewatch	·	520 m	MPC · JPL
484998	2009 VR_{34}	—	September 21, 2009	Mount Lemmon	Mount Lemmon Survey	·	2.5 km	MPC · JPL
484999	2009 VT_{35}	—	October 26, 2009	Kitt Peak	Spacewatch	·	3.2 km	MPC · JPL
485000	2009 VD_{36}	—	November 10, 2009	Mount Lemmon	Mount Lemmon Survey	·	3.5 km	MPC · JPL

back to top

== Meaning of names ==
As minor planet discoveries are confirmed, they are given a permanent number by the IAU's Minor Planet Center (MPC), and the discoverers can then submit names for them, following the IAU's naming conventions. The list below concerns those minor planets in the specified number-range that have received names, and explains the meanings of those names.

Official naming citations of newly named small Solar System bodies are approved and published in a bulletin by IAU's Working Group for Small Bodies Nomenclature (WGSBN). Before May 2021, citations were published in MPC's Minor Planet Circulars for many decades. Recent citations can also be found on the JPL Small-Body Database (SBDB). Until his death in 2016, German astronomer Lutz D. Schmadel compiled these citations into the Dictionary of Minor Planet Names (DMP) and regularly updated the collection.

Based on Paul Herget's The Names of the Minor Planets, Schmadel also researched the unclear origin of numerous asteroids, most of which had been named prior to World War II. This article incorporates text from this source, which is in the public domain: SBDB New namings may only be added to this list below after official publication as the preannouncement of names is condemned. The WGSBN publishes a comprehensive guideline for the naming rules of non-cometary small Solar System bodies.

Named minor planet	Provisional	This minor planet was named for...	Ref · Catalog
484613 Cerebrito	2008 SC_{82}	Blanca Lacruz "Cerebrito" Pleguezuelos (born 1998) began studying biochemistry at the Universidad Autónoma de Madrid in 2016. She shares with her family and the discoverer the passion for astronomical observation from La Cañada.	JPL · 484613
484734 Chienshu	2008 YX_{9}	Shu Chien (born 1931), a Chinese–American physiologist and bioengineer, who received the U.S. Medal of Science in 2010. In the early 1980s, he was a pioneer in cellular and molecular bioengineering.	IAU · 484734
