= List of minor planets: 482001–483000 =

The following is a partial list of minor planets, running from minor-planet number 482001 through 483000, inclusive. The primary data for this and other partial lists is based on JPL's "Small-Body Orbital Elements" and data available from the Minor Planet Center. Critical list information is also provided by the MPC, unless otherwise specified from Lowell Observatory. A detailed description of the table's columns and additional sources are given on the main page including a complete list of every page in this series, and a statistical break-up on the dynamical classification of minor planets.

Also see the summary list of all named bodies in numerical and alphabetical order, and the corresponding naming citations for the number range of this particular list. New namings may only be added to this list after official publication, as the preannouncement of names is condemned by the Working Group for Small Bodies Nomenclature of the International Astronomical Union.

Near-Earth obj.	MBA (inner)	MBA (outer)	Centaur
Mars-crosser	MBA (middle)	Jupiter trojan	Trans-Neptunian obj.
Unclassified

== 482001–482100 ==
Designation			Discovery			Properties		Ref
Permanent	Provisional	Named after	Date	Site	Discoverer(s)	Category	Diam.	Ref
482001	2009 SR_{125}	—	November 14, 2006	Kitt Peak	Spacewatch	·	760 m	MPC · JPL
482002	2009 SL_{141}	—	September 19, 2009	Kitt Peak	Spacewatch	·	660 m	MPC · JPL
482003	2009 SZ_{150}	—	November 27, 2006	Mount Lemmon	Mount Lemmon Survey	·	620 m	MPC · JPL
482004	2009 SL_{151}	—	July 5, 2002	Kitt Peak	Spacewatch	·	610 m	MPC · JPL
482005	2009 SN_{158}	—	September 20, 2009	Kitt Peak	Spacewatch	·	1.4 km	MPC · JPL
482006	2009 SA_{180}	—	September 20, 2009	Kitt Peak	Spacewatch	·	550 m	MPC · JPL
482007	2009 SN_{186}	—	September 21, 2009	Kitt Peak	Spacewatch	·	640 m	MPC · JPL
482008	2009 SY_{228}	—	September 26, 2009	LightBuckets	LightBuckets	·	590 m	MPC · JPL
482009	2009 SS_{234}	—	September 16, 2009	Mount Lemmon	Mount Lemmon Survey	·	570 m	MPC · JPL
482010	2009 SL_{267}	—	September 23, 2009	Mount Lemmon	Mount Lemmon Survey	·	750 m	MPC · JPL
482011	2009 SK_{298}	—	September 21, 2009	Catalina	CSS	·	800 m	MPC · JPL
482012	2009 TB_{21}	—	October 11, 2009	La Sagra	OAM	·	830 m	MPC · JPL
482013	2009 TN_{36}	—	October 14, 2009	La Sagra	OAM	·	760 m	MPC · JPL
482014	2009 TA_{47}	—	October 15, 2009	Socorro	LINEAR	·	980 m	MPC · JPL
482015	2009 US_{13}	—	October 18, 2009	Kitt Peak	Spacewatch	·	610 m	MPC · JPL
482016	2009 UT_{24}	—	October 18, 2009	Mount Lemmon	Mount Lemmon Survey	·	650 m	MPC · JPL
482017	2009 UW_{28}	—	September 22, 2009	Mount Lemmon	Mount Lemmon Survey	·	700 m	MPC · JPL
482018	2009 UB_{99}	—	October 23, 2009	Mount Lemmon	Mount Lemmon Survey	·	800 m	MPC · JPL
482019	2009 UQ_{121}	—	October 25, 2009	Kitt Peak	Spacewatch	·	1.3 km	MPC · JPL
482020	2009 UU_{127}	—	October 28, 2009	Bisei SG Center	BATTeRS	·	1.2 km	MPC · JPL
482021	2009 UR_{147}	—	October 17, 2009	Mount Lemmon	Mount Lemmon Survey	·	680 m	MPC · JPL
482022	2009 UX_{152}	—	September 20, 2009	Mount Lemmon	Mount Lemmon Survey	·	820 m	MPC · JPL
482023	2009 VY	—	October 16, 2009	Catalina	CSS	·	520 m	MPC · JPL
482024	2009 VM_{3}	—	October 22, 2009	Mount Lemmon	Mount Lemmon Survey	·	1.1 km	MPC · JPL
482025	2009 VP_{7}	—	November 8, 2009	Catalina	CSS	·	800 m	MPC · JPL
482026	2009 VX_{43}	—	October 14, 2009	Mount Lemmon	Mount Lemmon Survey	·	780 m	MPC · JPL
482027	2009 VS_{45}	—	November 8, 2009	Kitt Peak	Spacewatch	(1338) (FLO)	560 m	MPC · JPL
482028	2009 VN_{54}	—	September 18, 2009	Mount Lemmon	Mount Lemmon Survey	·	610 m	MPC · JPL
482029	2009 VK_{71}	—	November 9, 2009	Mount Lemmon	Mount Lemmon Survey	·	980 m	MPC · JPL
482030	2009 VE_{94}	—	October 23, 2009	Mount Lemmon	Mount Lemmon Survey	·	820 m	MPC · JPL
482031	2009 VK_{95}	—	November 10, 2009	Kitt Peak	Spacewatch	(2076)	770 m	MPC · JPL
482032	2009 VH_{115}	—	September 22, 2009	Mount Lemmon	Mount Lemmon Survey	·	1.2 km	MPC · JPL
482033	2009 WB_{17}	—	March 16, 2004	Kitt Peak	Spacewatch	·	620 m	MPC · JPL
482034	2009 WA_{23}	—	October 27, 2009	Kitt Peak	Spacewatch	·	800 m	MPC · JPL
482035	2009 WL_{23}	—	November 18, 2009	Kitt Peak	Spacewatch	·	760 m	MPC · JPL
482036	2009 WZ_{26}	—	October 27, 2009	Kitt Peak	Spacewatch	·	800 m	MPC · JPL
482037	2009 WO_{36}	—	November 17, 2009	Kitt Peak	Spacewatch	·	760 m	MPC · JPL
482038	2009 WR_{71}	—	November 10, 2009	Kitt Peak	Spacewatch	·	790 m	MPC · JPL
482039	2009 WH_{78}	—	September 17, 1998	Anderson Mesa	LONEOS	·	1.0 km	MPC · JPL
482040	2009 WZ_{84}	—	November 21, 2006	Mount Lemmon	Mount Lemmon Survey	·	810 m	MPC · JPL
482041	2009 WT_{105}	—	November 25, 2009	Mayhill	Mayhill	·	630 m	MPC · JPL
482042	2009 WO_{142}	—	November 19, 2009	Kitt Peak	Spacewatch	·	800 m	MPC · JPL
482043	2009 WF_{165}	—	November 21, 2009	Kitt Peak	Spacewatch	·	660 m	MPC · JPL
482044	2009 WJ_{223}	—	November 16, 2009	Kitt Peak	Spacewatch	V	580 m	MPC · JPL
482045	2009 WL_{234}	—	December 13, 2006	Kitt Peak	Spacewatch	·	1.8 km	MPC · JPL
482046	2009 WD_{236}	—	November 21, 2009	Kitt Peak	Spacewatch	·	870 m	MPC · JPL
482047	2009 WB_{256}	—	November 22, 2009	Kitt Peak	Spacewatch	·	860 m	MPC · JPL
482048	2009 WT_{259}	—	November 16, 2009	Kitt Peak	Spacewatch	·	1.1 km	MPC · JPL
482049	2009 XG_{8}	—	December 15, 2009	Mount Lemmon	Mount Lemmon Survey	AMO	610 m	MPC · JPL
482050	2009 XF_{15}	—	December 15, 2009	Mount Lemmon	Mount Lemmon Survey	·	710 m	MPC · JPL
482051	2009 XH_{19}	—	November 16, 2009	Mount Lemmon	Mount Lemmon Survey	ERI	1.1 km	MPC · JPL
482052	2009 YB_{3}	—	December 17, 2009	Mount Lemmon	Mount Lemmon Survey	·	880 m	MPC · JPL
482053	2009 YK_{9}	—	October 6, 2005	Catalina	CSS	·	800 m	MPC · JPL
482054	2010 AE	—	January 5, 2010	Kitt Peak	Spacewatch	APO	410 m	MPC · JPL
482055	2010 AH_{30}	—	January 10, 2010	Mount Lemmon	Mount Lemmon Survey	AMO +1km	1.9 km	MPC · JPL
482056	2010 AG_{64}	—	January 10, 2010	Kitt Peak	Spacewatch	·	580 m	MPC · JPL
482057	2010 AM_{70}	—	January 12, 2010	Catalina	CSS	PHO	920 m	MPC · JPL
482058	2010 AF_{80}	—	January 12, 2010	Mount Lemmon	Mount Lemmon Survey	T_{j} (2.97) · 3:2	5.1 km	MPC · JPL
482059	2010 BF_{2}	—	April 29, 2003	Kitt Peak	Spacewatch	·	1.1 km	MPC · JPL
482060	2010 BA_{4}	—	January 23, 2010	Bisei SG Center	BATTeRS	·	2.0 km	MPC · JPL
482061	2010 BN_{62}	—	January 21, 2010	WISE	WISE	·	2.8 km	MPC · JPL
482062	2010 CF_{4}	—	January 21, 1996	Kitt Peak	Spacewatch	·	690 m	MPC · JPL
482063	2010 CA_{12}	—	February 6, 2010	Mayhill	Lowe, A.	·	1.0 km	MPC · JPL
482064	2010 CR_{31}	—	November 24, 2009	Mount Lemmon	Mount Lemmon Survey	·	830 m	MPC · JPL
482065	2010 CO_{68}	—	February 10, 2010	Kitt Peak	Spacewatch	·	1.5 km	MPC · JPL
482066	2010 CV_{73}	—	February 13, 2010	Mount Lemmon	Mount Lemmon Survey	NYS	950 m	MPC · JPL
482067	2010 CH_{99}	—	February 14, 2010	Kitt Peak	Spacewatch	MAS	650 m	MPC · JPL
482068	2010 CU_{111}	—	January 23, 2006	Mount Lemmon	Mount Lemmon Survey	·	1.1 km	MPC · JPL
482069	2010 CV_{113}	—	December 5, 2005	Kitt Peak	Spacewatch	NYS	990 m	MPC · JPL
482070	2010 CD_{134}	—	February 15, 2010	WISE	WISE	·	2.5 km	MPC · JPL
482071	2010 CT_{139}	—	February 15, 2010	Mount Lemmon	Mount Lemmon Survey	·	1.7 km	MPC · JPL
482072	2010 CR_{249}	—	December 18, 2009	Mount Lemmon	Mount Lemmon Survey	·	1.3 km	MPC · JPL
482073	2010 DJ_{23}	—	February 18, 2010	WISE	WISE	·	2.7 km	MPC · JPL
482074	2010 DV_{34}	—	January 12, 2010	Kitt Peak	Spacewatch	NYS	980 m	MPC · JPL
482075	2010 DR_{79}	—	February 16, 2010	Mount Lemmon	Mount Lemmon Survey	·	1.9 km	MPC · JPL
482076	2010 EH_{32}	—	March 4, 2010	Kitt Peak	Spacewatch	MAS	610 m	MPC · JPL
482077	2010 EU_{40}	—	February 10, 2010	Kitt Peak	Spacewatch	MAS	620 m	MPC · JPL
482078	2010 EY_{42}	—	March 12, 2010	Purple Mountain	PMO NEO Survey Program	PHO	1.1 km	MPC · JPL
482079	2010 ED_{71}	—	March 12, 2010	Mount Lemmon	Mount Lemmon Survey	·	1.2 km	MPC · JPL
482080	2010 ED_{86}	—	March 13, 2010	Kitt Peak	Spacewatch	H	420 m	MPC · JPL
482081	2010 EG_{109}	—	March 15, 2010	Mount Lemmon	Mount Lemmon Survey	PHO	1.5 km	MPC · JPL
482082	2010 EM_{127}	—	March 15, 2010	Catalina	CSS	·	1.4 km	MPC · JPL
482083	2010 EB_{132}	—	March 15, 2010	Mount Lemmon	Mount Lemmon Survey	·	1.2 km	MPC · JPL
482084	2010 FL_{6}	—	March 16, 2010	Bisei SG Center	BATTeRS	·	730 m	MPC · JPL
482085	2010 GV_{128}	—	November 1, 2008	Kitt Peak	Spacewatch	MAS	630 m	MPC · JPL
482086	2010 HG_{8}	—	December 15, 2009	Mount Lemmon	Mount Lemmon Survey	·	2.1 km	MPC · JPL
482087	2010 HP_{21}	—	April 22, 2010	WISE	WISE	L5	13 km	MPC · JPL
482088	2010 HW_{22}	—	April 25, 2010	WISE	WISE	L5	13 km	MPC · JPL
482089	2010 HM_{103}	—	April 8, 2010	Kitt Peak	Spacewatch	·	2.3 km	MPC · JPL
482090	2010 JD_{48}	—	May 4, 2010	Kitt Peak	Spacewatch	H	490 m	MPC · JPL
482091	2010 JS_{57}	—	April 20, 2007	Kitt Peak	Spacewatch	·	1.5 km	MPC · JPL
482092	2010 JF_{118}	—	April 8, 2010	Kitt Peak	Spacewatch	·	2.1 km	MPC · JPL
482093	2010 JZ_{157}	—	May 13, 2010	Kitt Peak	Spacewatch	·	1.2 km	MPC · JPL
482094	2010 LD_{46}	—	June 8, 2010	WISE	WISE	THB	2.5 km	MPC · JPL
482095	2010 LM_{101}	—	June 13, 2010	WISE	WISE	·	3.4 km	MPC · JPL
482096	2010 LV_{114}	—	June 13, 2010	WISE	WISE	·	2.3 km	MPC · JPL
482097	2010 LF_{132}	—	June 15, 2010	WISE	WISE	·	2.9 km	MPC · JPL
482098	2010 MV_{1}	—	June 20, 2010	Mount Lemmon	Mount Lemmon Survey	·	4.5 km	MPC · JPL
482099	2010 MM_{11}	—	June 17, 2010	WISE	WISE	·	2.6 km	MPC · JPL
482100	2010 MR_{28}	—	June 19, 2010	WISE	WISE	·	3.7 km	MPC · JPL

== 482101–482200 ==
back to top

Designation			Discovery			Properties		Ref
Permanent	Provisional	Named after	Date	Site	Discoverer(s)	Category	Diam.	Ref
482101 Arizonacu	2010 MB_{43}	Arizonacu	March 16, 2010	Catalina	CSS	·	2.5 km	MPC · JPL
482102	2010 MX_{45}	—	October 12, 1999	Socorro	LINEAR	T_{j} (2.98)	3.2 km	MPC · JPL
482103	2010 MG_{59}	—	June 24, 2010	WISE	WISE	LIX	3.6 km	MPC · JPL
482104	2010 MU_{71}	—	June 25, 2010	WISE	WISE	·	5.4 km	MPC · JPL
482105	2010 MS_{74}	—	June 26, 2010	WISE	WISE	·	3.1 km	MPC · JPL
482106	2010 MX_{79}	—	June 26, 2010	WISE	WISE	·	3.4 km	MPC · JPL
482107	2010 MD_{80}	—	June 26, 2010	WISE	WISE	·	3.8 km	MPC · JPL
482108	2010 MC_{83}	—	June 27, 2010	WISE	WISE	·	4.3 km	MPC · JPL
482109	2010 MG_{100}	—	June 29, 2010	WISE	WISE	·	3.8 km	MPC · JPL
482110	2010 MX_{108}	—	June 30, 2010	WISE	WISE	·	3.4 km	MPC · JPL
482111	2010 NT_{1}	—	July 4, 2010	WISE	WISE	AMO	380 m	MPC · JPL
482112	2010 NN_{17}	—	July 6, 2010	WISE	WISE	THB	3.2 km	MPC · JPL
482113	2010 NF_{20}	—	July 6, 2010	WISE	WISE	·	3.7 km	MPC · JPL
482114	2010 NZ_{32}	—	July 7, 2010	WISE	WISE	·	3.0 km	MPC · JPL
482115	2010 NM_{52}	—	July 10, 2010	WISE	WISE	·	2.2 km	MPC · JPL
482116	2010 NC_{67}	—	December 3, 2005	Kitt Peak	Spacewatch	·	4.0 km	MPC · JPL
482117	2010 NQ_{77}	—	October 12, 1999	Socorro	LINEAR	T_{j} (2.9)	3.4 km	MPC · JPL
482118	2010 NH_{98}	—	November 25, 2005	Kitt Peak	Spacewatch	T_{j} (2.99)	3.9 km	MPC · JPL
482119	2010 OW_{21}	—	July 18, 2010	WISE	WISE	·	4.1 km	MPC · JPL
482120	2010 OG_{24}	—	July 18, 2010	WISE	WISE	·	1.7 km	MPC · JPL
482121	2010 OZ_{42}	—	July 21, 2010	WISE	WISE	·	3.0 km	MPC · JPL
482122	2010 OF_{80}	—	July 26, 2010	WISE	WISE	·	2.7 km	MPC · JPL
482123	2010 OG_{110}	—	April 1, 2008	Kitt Peak	Spacewatch	VER	3.7 km	MPC · JPL
482124	2010 OD_{124}	—	July 31, 2010	WISE	WISE	·	4.1 km	MPC · JPL
482125	2010 PX_{2}	—	August 15, 2004	Siding Spring	SSS	·	4.2 km	MPC · JPL
482126	2010 PJ_{63}	—	June 19, 2010	Mount Lemmon	Mount Lemmon Survey	·	3.1 km	MPC · JPL
482127	2010 PR_{70}	—	August 10, 2010	WISE	WISE	·	3.3 km	MPC · JPL
482128	2010 RY_{1}	—	June 19, 2010	Mount Lemmon	Mount Lemmon Survey	H	620 m	MPC · JPL
482129	2010 RC_{5}	—	September 1, 2010	ESA OGS	ESA OGS	·	1.8 km	MPC · JPL
482130	2010 RN_{50}	—	July 10, 2010	WISE	WISE	·	2.2 km	MPC · JPL
482131	2010 RS_{81}	—	March 9, 2008	Kitt Peak	Spacewatch	·	3.1 km	MPC · JPL
482132	2010 RF_{100}	—	January 28, 2007	Mount Lemmon	Mount Lemmon Survey	·	1.5 km	MPC · JPL
482133	2010 RG_{116}	—	January 27, 2007	Mount Lemmon	Mount Lemmon Survey	·	2.6 km	MPC · JPL
482134	2010 RB_{154}	—	September 15, 2010	Kitt Peak	Spacewatch	·	3.0 km	MPC · JPL
482135	2010 RU_{155}	—	September 15, 2010	Kitt Peak	Spacewatch	·	3.6 km	MPC · JPL
482136	2010 RB_{172}	—	September 4, 2010	Kitt Peak	Spacewatch	·	2.5 km	MPC · JPL
482137	2010 RT_{174}	—	September 9, 2010	Kitt Peak	Spacewatch	·	2.5 km	MPC · JPL
482138	2010 RL_{176}	—	September 10, 2010	Kitt Peak	Spacewatch	·	2.4 km	MPC · JPL
482139	2010 RP_{182}	—	July 9, 2010	WISE	WISE	·	3.0 km	MPC · JPL
482140	2010 RC_{183}	—	March 15, 2007	Kitt Peak	Spacewatch	·	2.1 km	MPC · JPL
482141	2010 RR_{183}	—	November 30, 1999	Kitt Peak	Spacewatch	·	2.7 km	MPC · JPL
482142	2010 SE_{13}	—	September 18, 2010	Mount Lemmon	Mount Lemmon Survey	EOS	2.3 km	MPC · JPL
482143	2010 SE_{20}	—	September 18, 2010	Kitt Peak	Spacewatch	·	2.3 km	MPC · JPL
482144	2010 SJ_{26}	—	June 24, 2010	WISE	WISE	·	2.3 km	MPC · JPL
482145	2010 TP_{8}	—	September 2, 2010	Mount Lemmon	Mount Lemmon Survey	EMA	2.8 km	MPC · JPL
482146	2010 TD_{9}	—	August 22, 2004	Kitt Peak	Spacewatch	·	2.1 km	MPC · JPL
482147	2010 TD_{10}	—	September 3, 1999	Kitt Peak	Spacewatch	·	1.9 km	MPC · JPL
482148	2010 TA_{13}	—	September 15, 2010	Kitt Peak	Spacewatch	·	2.3 km	MPC · JPL
482149	2010 TF_{14}	—	November 4, 2005	Mount Lemmon	Mount Lemmon Survey	·	2.7 km	MPC · JPL
482150	2010 TL_{23}	—	July 9, 2010	WISE	WISE	THM	1.8 km	MPC · JPL
482151	2010 TP_{30}	—	November 1, 2005	Kitt Peak	Spacewatch	·	2.1 km	MPC · JPL
482152	2010 TT_{32}	—	October 2, 2010	Kitt Peak	Spacewatch	·	2.1 km	MPC · JPL
482153	2010 TB_{34}	—	October 2, 2010	Kitt Peak	Spacewatch	·	2.3 km	MPC · JPL
482154	2010 TN_{36}	—	October 3, 2010	Catalina	CSS	·	2.3 km	MPC · JPL
482155	2010 TY_{38}	—	February 24, 2009	Catalina	CSS	H	640 m	MPC · JPL
482156	2010 TA_{57}	—	September 8, 2010	Kitt Peak	Spacewatch	·	2.4 km	MPC · JPL
482157	2010 TR_{67}	—	September 4, 2010	Kitt Peak	Spacewatch	·	2.9 km	MPC · JPL
482158	2010 TN_{71}	—	September 30, 2010	Catalina	CSS	·	2.7 km	MPC · JPL
482159	2010 TN_{79}	—	September 17, 2010	Kitt Peak	Spacewatch	EOS	2.2 km	MPC · JPL
482160	2010 TV_{79}	—	September 17, 2010	Kitt Peak	Spacewatch	·	2.7 km	MPC · JPL
482161	2010 TG_{86}	—	September 30, 2010	Mount Lemmon	Mount Lemmon Survey	VER	2.7 km	MPC · JPL
482162	2010 TN_{92}	—	May 30, 2009	Mount Lemmon	Mount Lemmon Survey	LIX	3.1 km	MPC · JPL
482163	2010 TC_{100}	—	July 9, 2010	WISE	WISE	URS	2.4 km	MPC · JPL
482164	2010 TD_{101}	—	March 11, 2007	Kitt Peak	Spacewatch	·	2.6 km	MPC · JPL
482165	2010 TL_{120}	—	October 27, 2005	Kitt Peak	Spacewatch	HYG	1.7 km	MPC · JPL
482166	2010 TP_{121}	—	June 28, 2010	WISE	WISE	·	2.3 km	MPC · JPL
482167	2010 TQ_{152}	—	October 30, 2005	Mount Lemmon	Mount Lemmon Survey	·	2.6 km	MPC · JPL
482168	2010 TS_{153}	—	October 26, 2005	Kitt Peak	Spacewatch	·	2.2 km	MPC · JPL
482169	2010 TD_{159}	—	December 30, 2005	Mount Lemmon	Mount Lemmon Survey	·	2.1 km	MPC · JPL
482170	2010 TH_{172}	—	September 17, 2010	Mount Lemmon	Mount Lemmon Survey	·	2.4 km	MPC · JPL
482171	2010 TU_{172}	—	July 23, 2010	WISE	WISE	·	3.4 km	MPC · JPL
482172	2010 TU_{176}	—	October 9, 2010	Catalina	CSS	·	4.1 km	MPC · JPL
482173	2010 TG_{178}	—	September 19, 2010	Kitt Peak	Spacewatch	·	2.9 km	MPC · JPL
482174	2010 TZ_{183}	—	October 3, 2005	Kitt Peak	Spacewatch	·	1.8 km	MPC · JPL
482175	2010 TC_{186}	—	November 25, 2005	Kitt Peak	Spacewatch	·	3.6 km	MPC · JPL
482176	2010 TQ_{189}	—	March 10, 2007	Mount Lemmon	Mount Lemmon Survey	·	3.1 km	MPC · JPL
482177	2010 UA_{8}	—	March 18, 2009	Catalina	CSS	H	770 m	MPC · JPL
482178	2010 UV_{10}	—	October 17, 2010	Mount Lemmon	Mount Lemmon Survey	·	2.2 km	MPC · JPL
482179	2010 UN_{30}	—	April 5, 2008	Kitt Peak	Spacewatch	·	2.2 km	MPC · JPL
482180	2010 UT_{31}	—	September 30, 2010	Mount Lemmon	Mount Lemmon Survey	·	3.0 km	MPC · JPL
482181	2010 UQ_{32}	—	October 11, 2010	Mount Lemmon	Mount Lemmon Survey	·	3.0 km	MPC · JPL
482182	2010 UJ_{36}	—	April 22, 2007	Kitt Peak	Spacewatch	T_{j} (2.99)	3.7 km	MPC · JPL
482183	2010 UY_{37}	—	October 14, 2010	Mount Lemmon	Mount Lemmon Survey	EOS	1.6 km	MPC · JPL
482184	2010 UN_{44}	—	October 30, 2010	Catalina	CSS	·	3.8 km	MPC · JPL
482185	2010 UN_{51}	—	October 14, 2010	Mount Lemmon	Mount Lemmon Survey	·	3.6 km	MPC · JPL
482186	2010 UC_{57}	—	August 1, 2010	WISE	WISE	·	3.0 km	MPC · JPL
482187	2010 UW_{62}	—	October 13, 2010	Mount Lemmon	Mount Lemmon Survey	·	4.0 km	MPC · JPL
482188	2010 UD_{63}	—	October 30, 2010	Catalina	CSS	VER	3.2 km	MPC · JPL
482189	2010 UL_{75}	—	October 11, 2010	Catalina	CSS	·	3.2 km	MPC · JPL
482190	2010 US_{75}	—	October 13, 2010	Mount Lemmon	Mount Lemmon Survey	EOS	2.0 km	MPC · JPL
482191	2010 UR_{86}	—	July 25, 2010	WISE	WISE	·	2.3 km	MPC · JPL
482192	2010 UL_{90}	—	October 31, 2010	Kitt Peak	Spacewatch	·	3.7 km	MPC · JPL
482193	2010 UO_{101}	—	December 4, 2005	Kitt Peak	Spacewatch	THM	1.6 km	MPC · JPL
482194	2010 VN_{40}	—	October 11, 2010	Mount Lemmon	Mount Lemmon Survey	VER	2.4 km	MPC · JPL
482195	2010 VU_{59}	—	March 14, 2007	Kitt Peak	Spacewatch	·	2.9 km	MPC · JPL
482196	2010 VL_{64}	—	November 6, 2010	Mount Lemmon	Mount Lemmon Survey	·	1.9 km	MPC · JPL
482197	2010 VG_{71}	—	October 28, 2010	Mount Lemmon	Mount Lemmon Survey	CYB	3.1 km	MPC · JPL
482198	2010 VO_{91}	—	November 17, 2004	Campo Imperatore	CINEOS	·	3.0 km	MPC · JPL
482199	2010 VX_{93}	—	September 11, 2010	Mount Lemmon	Mount Lemmon Survey	·	3.1 km	MPC · JPL
482200	2010 VA_{103}	—	November 5, 2010	Mount Lemmon	Mount Lemmon Survey	EOS	1.7 km	MPC · JPL

== 482201–482300 ==
back to top

Designation			Discovery			Properties		Ref
Permanent	Provisional	Named after	Date	Site	Discoverer(s)	Category	Diam.	Ref
482201	2010 VV_{115}	—	October 30, 2010	Kitt Peak	Spacewatch	·	2.5 km	MPC · JPL
482202	2010 VW_{118}	—	December 27, 2005	Kitt Peak	Spacewatch	·	3.0 km	MPC · JPL
482203	2010 VV_{160}	—	October 29, 2010	Kitt Peak	Spacewatch	·	3.1 km	MPC · JPL
482204	2010 VU_{170}	—	March 14, 2007	Mount Lemmon	Mount Lemmon Survey	·	3.2 km	MPC · JPL
482205	2010 VF_{173}	—	November 10, 2010	Mount Lemmon	Mount Lemmon Survey	·	3.2 km	MPC · JPL
482206	2010 VR_{175}	—	October 17, 2010	Mount Lemmon	Mount Lemmon Survey	TIR	2.8 km	MPC · JPL
482207	2010 VU_{180}	—	November 11, 2010	Mount Lemmon	Mount Lemmon Survey	·	1.9 km	MPC · JPL
482208	2010 VQ_{199}	—	November 9, 1999	Socorro	LINEAR	T_{j} (2.97)	2.6 km	MPC · JPL
482209	2010 VB_{213}	—	July 23, 2010	WISE	WISE	·	3.6 km	MPC · JPL
482210	2010 VW_{214}	—	September 18, 2010	Mount Lemmon	Mount Lemmon Survey	·	2.6 km	MPC · JPL
482211	2010 VA_{215}	—	October 30, 2005	Mount Lemmon	Mount Lemmon Survey	EOS	2.2 km	MPC · JPL
482212	2010 WM_{11}	—	October 6, 2004	Kitt Peak	Spacewatch	·	3.2 km	MPC · JPL
482213	2010 WP_{11}	—	November 16, 2010	Mount Lemmon	Mount Lemmon Survey	·	3.0 km	MPC · JPL
482214	2010 WG_{31}	—	November 11, 2010	Mount Lemmon	Mount Lemmon Survey	·	2.8 km	MPC · JPL
482215	2010 WY_{40}	—	October 30, 2010	Kitt Peak	Spacewatch	LIX	2.8 km	MPC · JPL
482216	2010 WX_{44}	—	December 26, 2005	Mount Lemmon	Mount Lemmon Survey	·	2.7 km	MPC · JPL
482217	2010 WO_{52}	—	October 14, 2010	Mount Lemmon	Mount Lemmon Survey	·	3.1 km	MPC · JPL
482218	2010 WM_{74}	—	November 7, 2010	Catalina	CSS	T_{j} (2.98)	4.5 km	MPC · JPL
482219	2010 XS_{1}	—	November 29, 2005	Kitt Peak	Spacewatch	·	3.2 km	MPC · JPL
482220	2010 XC_{21}	—	November 12, 2010	Kitt Peak	Spacewatch	·	4.0 km	MPC · JPL
482221	2010 XF_{21}	—	November 6, 2010	Catalina	CSS	·	4.5 km	MPC · JPL
482222	2010 XW_{27}	—	October 10, 2004	Kitt Peak	Spacewatch	·	2.1 km	MPC · JPL
482223	2010 XJ_{30}	—	January 2, 2006	Catalina	CSS	·	3.3 km	MPC · JPL
482224	2010 XF_{66}	—	December 10, 2010	Mount Lemmon	Mount Lemmon Survey	·	2.7 km	MPC · JPL
482225	2010 XS_{74}	—	October 7, 2004	Kitt Peak	Spacewatch	·	2.7 km	MPC · JPL
482226	2011 AP_{21}	—	May 24, 2006	Kitt Peak	Spacewatch	SYL · CYB	5.4 km	MPC · JPL
482227	2011 AB_{47}	—	September 28, 2006	Kitt Peak	Spacewatch	·	690 m	MPC · JPL
482228	2011 BH_{10}	—	January 22, 2011	Mount Lemmon	Mount Lemmon Survey	APO +1km	860 m	MPC · JPL
482229	2011 BG_{23}	—	December 7, 2010	Mount Lemmon	Mount Lemmon Survey	H	530 m	MPC · JPL
482230	2011 BW_{79}	—	January 27, 2011	Mount Lemmon	Mount Lemmon Survey	·	2.7 km	MPC · JPL
482231	2011 BZ_{91}	—	November 21, 2006	Mount Lemmon	Mount Lemmon Survey	·	880 m	MPC · JPL
482232	2011 CO_{25}	—	January 27, 2011	Mount Lemmon	Mount Lemmon Survey	·	810 m	MPC · JPL
482233	2011 CR_{50}	—	October 6, 2008	Mount Lemmon	Mount Lemmon Survey	·	4.3 km	MPC · JPL
482234	2011 CG_{71}	—	January 28, 2011	Catalina	CSS	AMO	110 m	MPC · JPL
482235	2011 CS_{107}	—	September 22, 2003	Kitt Peak	Spacewatch	·	440 m	MPC · JPL
482236	2011 EC_{78}	—	September 1, 2005	Kitt Peak	Spacewatch	·	770 m	MPC · JPL
482237	2011 FS_{20}	—	March 2, 2011	Kitt Peak	Spacewatch	·	910 m	MPC · JPL
482238	2011 FR_{28}	—	March 25, 2011	Catalina	CSS	·	710 m	MPC · JPL
482239	2011 FP_{67}	—	November 26, 2009	Kitt Peak	Spacewatch	·	910 m	MPC · JPL
482240	2011 FE_{80}	—	March 11, 2011	Kitt Peak	Spacewatch	·	750 m	MPC · JPL
482241	2011 FV_{99}	—	November 10, 2009	Kitt Peak	Spacewatch	·	900 m	MPC · JPL
482242	2011 GH_{72}	—	March 12, 2011	Mount Lemmon	Mount Lemmon Survey	·	970 m	MPC · JPL
482243	2011 GO_{74}	—	April 13, 2011	Kitt Peak	Spacewatch	·	1.3 km	MPC · JPL
482244	2011 HR	—	April 24, 2011	Haleakala	Pan-STARRS 1	AMO	380 m	MPC · JPL
482245	2011 HN_{29}	—	March 19, 2007	Mount Lemmon	Mount Lemmon Survey	·	1.3 km	MPC · JPL
482246	2011 HB_{66}	—	March 27, 2011	Kitt Peak	Spacewatch	·	640 m	MPC · JPL
482247	2011 HZ_{92}	—	March 8, 2011	Kitt Peak	Spacewatch	·	700 m	MPC · JPL
482248	2011 JS_{25}	—	April 11, 2011	Mount Lemmon	Mount Lemmon Survey	·	930 m	MPC · JPL
482249	2011 KT_{21}	—	April 19, 2010	WISE	WISE	L5	9.4 km	MPC · JPL
482250	2011 LL_{2}	—	June 5, 2011	Catalina	CSS	AMO · PHA · fast	330 m	MPC · JPL
482251	2011 MW_{4}	—	June 4, 2011	Mount Lemmon	Mount Lemmon Survey	·	1.6 km	MPC · JPL
482252	2011 NO_{3}	—	January 15, 2004	Kitt Peak	Spacewatch	·	2.9 km	MPC · JPL
482253	2011 OA_{11}	—	September 13, 2007	Catalina	CSS	·	1.3 km	MPC · JPL
482254	2011 OK_{22}	—	October 8, 2007	Catalina	CSS	·	1.6 km	MPC · JPL
482255	2011 OD_{41}	—	June 17, 2010	WISE	WISE	·	2.3 km	MPC · JPL
482256	2011 PC_{1}	—	June 30, 2011	Siding Spring	SSS	·	2.0 km	MPC · JPL
482257	2011 PM_{1}	—	September 5, 2007	Anderson Mesa	LONEOS	·	1.9 km	MPC · JPL
482258	2011 PV_{9}	—	June 7, 2011	Mount Lemmon	Mount Lemmon Survey	JUN	990 m	MPC · JPL
482259	2011 QO_{26}	—	October 24, 2007	Mount Lemmon	Mount Lemmon Survey	·	1.8 km	MPC · JPL
482260	2011 QV_{27}	—	October 8, 2007	Catalina	CSS	·	1.9 km	MPC · JPL
482261	2011 QP_{32}	—	October 20, 2007	Mount Lemmon	Mount Lemmon Survey	AST	1.5 km	MPC · JPL
482262	2011 QJ_{45}	—	October 8, 2007	Catalina	CSS	·	1.8 km	MPC · JPL
482263	2011 QR_{54}	—	November 19, 2007	Mount Lemmon	Mount Lemmon Survey	DOR	1.8 km	MPC · JPL
482264	2011 QW_{73}	—	March 13, 2010	Kitt Peak	Spacewatch	·	1.4 km	MPC · JPL
482265	2011 QQ_{89}	—	October 5, 2002	Kitt Peak	Spacewatch	(13314)	1.4 km	MPC · JPL
482266	2011 QK_{99}	—	March 13, 2008	Kitt Peak	Spacewatch	L5	7.5 km	MPC · JPL
482267	2011 RC_{3}	—	December 19, 2004	Kitt Peak	Spacewatch	EUN	1.2 km	MPC · JPL
482268	2011 RG_{4}	—	October 1, 2002	Anderson Mesa	LONEOS	·	1.9 km	MPC · JPL
482269	2011 RG_{16}	—	January 18, 2009	Kitt Peak	Spacewatch	·	2.5 km	MPC · JPL
482270	2011 RM_{17}	—	November 3, 2007	Kitt Peak	Spacewatch	·	1.1 km	MPC · JPL
482271	2011 RR_{19}	—	December 30, 2007	Mount Lemmon	Mount Lemmon Survey	·	1.6 km	MPC · JPL
482272	2011 SX_{6}	—	November 4, 2007	Kitt Peak	Spacewatch	NEM	1.7 km	MPC · JPL
482273	2011 SX_{19}	—	October 14, 2007	Mount Lemmon	Mount Lemmon Survey	·	3.4 km	MPC · JPL
482274	2011 SU_{63}	—	April 8, 2010	Kitt Peak	Spacewatch	·	2.2 km	MPC · JPL
482275	2011 SU_{103}	—	September 23, 2011	Kitt Peak	Spacewatch	JUN	1.0 km	MPC · JPL
482276	2011 SY_{117}	—	October 1, 2002	Anderson Mesa	LONEOS	GEF	1.1 km	MPC · JPL
482277	2011 SJ_{121}	—	September 21, 2011	Kitt Peak	Spacewatch	EUN	1.2 km	MPC · JPL
482278	2011 SS_{122}	—	September 20, 2011	Kitt Peak	Spacewatch	·	1.5 km	MPC · JPL
482279	2011 SO_{135}	—	September 21, 2011	Catalina	CSS	·	1.4 km	MPC · JPL
482280	2011 SX_{146}	—	September 26, 2011	Mount Lemmon	Mount Lemmon Survey	·	1.5 km	MPC · JPL
482281	2011 SC_{213}	—	September 21, 2011	Kitt Peak	Spacewatch	DOR	2.2 km	MPC · JPL
482282	2011 SJ_{215}	—	March 2, 2009	Mount Lemmon	Mount Lemmon Survey	·	1.3 km	MPC · JPL
482283	2011 SH_{227}	—	November 5, 2007	Mount Lemmon	Mount Lemmon Survey	·	1.8 km	MPC · JPL
482284	2011 SF_{231}	—	September 29, 2011	Mount Lemmon	Mount Lemmon Survey	EUN	1.1 km	MPC · JPL
482285	2011 SM_{245}	—	August 21, 2006	Kitt Peak	Spacewatch	·	1.7 km	MPC · JPL
482286	2011 SU_{256}	—	September 15, 2006	Kitt Peak	Spacewatch	HOF	2.1 km	MPC · JPL
482287	2011 SL_{268}	—	September 23, 2011	Mount Lemmon	Mount Lemmon Survey	·	1.6 km	MPC · JPL
482288	2011 TL_{1}	—	September 20, 2011	Kitt Peak	Spacewatch	·	870 m	MPC · JPL
482289	2011 TU_{2}	—	September 22, 2011	Catalina	CSS	EUN	1.3 km	MPC · JPL
482290	2011 TQ_{7}	—	September 26, 2011	Kitt Peak	Spacewatch	·	1.5 km	MPC · JPL
482291	2011 TT_{8}	—	September 23, 2011	Kitt Peak	Spacewatch	·	600 m	MPC · JPL
482292	2011 TV_{11}	—	March 18, 2009	Kitt Peak	Spacewatch	EUN	1.4 km	MPC · JPL
482293	2011 TO_{13}	—	September 7, 2011	Kitt Peak	Spacewatch	·	2.1 km	MPC · JPL
482294	2011 TH_{15}	—	September 21, 2011	Catalina	CSS	·	2.2 km	MPC · JPL
482295	2011 TS_{15}	—	September 21, 2011	Catalina	CSS	·	2.0 km	MPC · JPL
482296	2011 UM_{1}	—	October 16, 2011	Kitt Peak	Spacewatch	HYG	2.8 km	MPC · JPL
482297	2011 UJ_{6}	—	December 21, 2007	Mount Lemmon	Mount Lemmon Survey	·	1.8 km	MPC · JPL
482298	2011 UG_{53}	—	October 18, 2011	Mount Lemmon	Mount Lemmon Survey	·	2.0 km	MPC · JPL
482299	2011 UH_{68}	—	September 22, 2011	Kitt Peak	Spacewatch	·	2.4 km	MPC · JPL
482300	2011 UC_{80}	—	January 11, 2008	Kitt Peak	Spacewatch	AEO	980 m	MPC · JPL

== 482301–482400 ==
back to top

Designation			Discovery			Properties		Ref
Permanent	Provisional	Named after	Date	Site	Discoverer(s)	Category	Diam.	Ref
482301	2011 UT_{85}	—	October 20, 2011	Mount Lemmon	Mount Lemmon Survey	HOF	2.5 km	MPC · JPL
482302	2011 UR_{87}	—	October 21, 2006	Kitt Peak	Spacewatch	BRA	1.2 km	MPC · JPL
482303	2011 UJ_{92}	—	August 28, 2006	Kitt Peak	Spacewatch	HOF	2.0 km	MPC · JPL
482304	2011 UF_{95}	—	October 19, 2011	Mount Lemmon	Mount Lemmon Survey	·	1.7 km	MPC · JPL
482305	2011 UC_{97}	—	August 21, 2006	Kitt Peak	Spacewatch	·	1.6 km	MPC · JPL
482306	2011 UL_{126}	—	February 11, 2008	Dauban	C. Rinner, F. Kugel	EOS	2.2 km	MPC · JPL
482307	2011 UT_{128}	—	October 20, 2011	Kitt Peak	Spacewatch	JUN	870 m	MPC · JPL
482308	2011 UA_{133}	—	November 3, 2007	Kitt Peak	Spacewatch	·	1.4 km	MPC · JPL
482309	2011 UF_{146}	—	October 24, 2011	Kitt Peak	Spacewatch	EOS	1.9 km	MPC · JPL
482310	2011 UR_{161}	—	October 23, 2011	Kitt Peak	Spacewatch	·	1.3 km	MPC · JPL
482311	2011 UV_{180}	—	April 6, 1999	Kitt Peak	Spacewatch	·	1.5 km	MPC · JPL
482312	2011 UE_{193}	—	September 20, 2011	Mount Lemmon	Mount Lemmon Survey	EUN	1.4 km	MPC · JPL
482313	2011 UF_{201}	—	October 25, 2011	XuYi	PMO NEO Survey Program	·	1.6 km	MPC · JPL
482314	2011 UF_{207}	—	February 23, 2010	WISE	WISE	·	3.7 km	MPC · JPL
482315	2011 US_{209}	—	September 26, 2011	Kitt Peak	Spacewatch	·	1.7 km	MPC · JPL
482316	2011 UP_{228}	—	March 15, 2004	Kitt Peak	Spacewatch	AEO	1.2 km	MPC · JPL
482317	2011 UV_{236}	—	September 22, 2011	Mount Lemmon	Mount Lemmon Survey	·	1.8 km	MPC · JPL
482318	2011 UA_{238}	—	October 22, 2011	Kitt Peak	Spacewatch	·	1.6 km	MPC · JPL
482319	2011 UQ_{239}	—	September 26, 2006	Mount Lemmon	Mount Lemmon Survey	·	1.6 km	MPC · JPL
482320	2011 UT_{242}	—	October 22, 2011	Kitt Peak	Spacewatch	EOS	1.8 km	MPC · JPL
482321	2011 UE_{244}	—	October 2, 2006	Mount Lemmon	Mount Lemmon Survey	·	1.6 km	MPC · JPL
482322	2011 UC_{249}	—	September 26, 2006	Kitt Peak	Spacewatch	·	1.4 km	MPC · JPL
482323	2011 UJ_{251}	—	October 22, 2011	Kitt Peak	Spacewatch	·	1.9 km	MPC · JPL
482324	2011 UT_{262}	—	October 13, 2006	Kitt Peak	Spacewatch	·	1.3 km	MPC · JPL
482325	2011 UA_{263}	—	October 21, 2011	Mount Lemmon	Mount Lemmon Survey	·	1.9 km	MPC · JPL
482326	2011 UU_{273}	—	November 19, 2003	Kitt Peak	Spacewatch	KON	1.7 km	MPC · JPL
482327	2011 UG_{284}	—	October 28, 2011	Kitt Peak	Spacewatch	·	1.7 km	MPC · JPL
482328	2011 UH_{297}	—	October 21, 2011	Kitt Peak	Spacewatch	·	1.3 km	MPC · JPL
482329	2011 UM_{306}	—	November 7, 2002	Socorro	LINEAR	·	1.5 km	MPC · JPL
482330	2011 UC_{314}	—	November 12, 2006	Mount Lemmon	Mount Lemmon Survey	·	1.4 km	MPC · JPL
482331	2011 UX_{327}	—	October 22, 2011	Kitt Peak	Spacewatch	·	2.5 km	MPC · JPL
482332	2011 UX_{329}	—	October 23, 2011	Kitt Peak	Spacewatch	·	2.1 km	MPC · JPL
482333	2011 UL_{335}	—	September 21, 2011	Kitt Peak	Spacewatch	·	2.4 km	MPC · JPL
482334	2011 UE_{343}	—	January 16, 2008	Mount Lemmon	Mount Lemmon Survey	·	1.9 km	MPC · JPL
482335	2011 UJ_{351}	—	December 14, 2007	Mount Lemmon	Mount Lemmon Survey	·	1.7 km	MPC · JPL
482336	2011 UT_{353}	—	March 28, 2009	Kitt Peak	Spacewatch	·	2.2 km	MPC · JPL
482337	2011 UR_{390}	—	October 21, 2006	Kitt Peak	Spacewatch	·	1.4 km	MPC · JPL
482338	2011 UO_{391}	—	December 31, 2002	Socorro	LINEAR	(18466)	2.4 km	MPC · JPL
482339	2011 UF_{402}	—	November 12, 2006	Mount Lemmon	Mount Lemmon Survey	H	410 m	MPC · JPL
482340	2011 VC_{10}	—	September 28, 2006	Kitt Peak	Spacewatch	·	1.3 km	MPC · JPL
482341	2011 VP_{16}	—	October 20, 2011	Kitt Peak	Spacewatch	·	1.7 km	MPC · JPL
482342	2011 VX_{21}	—	October 21, 2006	Mount Lemmon	Mount Lemmon Survey	·	1.6 km	MPC · JPL
482343	2011 VT_{22}	—	October 21, 2011	Mount Lemmon	Mount Lemmon Survey	·	1.5 km	MPC · JPL
482344	2011 WL_{15}	—	November 22, 2011	Haleakala	Pan-STARRS 1	APO · PHA	420 m	MPC · JPL
482345	2011 WH_{17}	—	May 12, 2010	WISE	WISE	·	3.2 km	MPC · JPL
482346	2011 WX_{17}	—	November 17, 2007	Catalina	CSS	·	1.5 km	MPC · JPL
482347	2011 WU_{22}	—	November 23, 2006	Kitt Peak	Spacewatch	KOR	1.1 km	MPC · JPL
482348	2011 WH_{44}	—	November 2, 2011	Mount Lemmon	Mount Lemmon Survey	·	2.2 km	MPC · JPL
482349	2011 WE_{58}	—	December 16, 2006	Kitt Peak	Spacewatch	EOS	1.7 km	MPC · JPL
482350	2011 WN_{60}	—	January 13, 2002	Kitt Peak	Spacewatch	·	1.4 km	MPC · JPL
482351	2011 WW_{70}	—	January 14, 2008	Kitt Peak	Spacewatch	·	2.4 km	MPC · JPL
482352	2011 WS_{76}	—	May 10, 2005	Kitt Peak	Spacewatch	·	1.7 km	MPC · JPL
482353	2011 WH_{79}	—	October 21, 2006	Kitt Peak	Spacewatch	KOR	1.2 km	MPC · JPL
482354	2011 WE_{87}	—	November 10, 2006	Kitt Peak	Spacewatch	·	1.8 km	MPC · JPL
482355	2011 WS_{98}	—	October 24, 2011	Mount Lemmon	Mount Lemmon Survey	·	2.8 km	MPC · JPL
482356	2011 WU_{105}	—	October 23, 2011	Kitt Peak	Spacewatch	·	3.1 km	MPC · JPL
482357	2011 WF_{118}	—	October 2, 2006	Mount Lemmon	Mount Lemmon Survey	·	1.2 km	MPC · JPL
482358	2011 WS_{118}	—	November 18, 2011	Mount Lemmon	Mount Lemmon Survey	·	2.8 km	MPC · JPL
482359	2011 WQ_{119}	—	July 29, 2006	Siding Spring	SSS	·	2.4 km	MPC · JPL
482360	2011 WH_{130}	—	October 27, 2011	Mount Lemmon	Mount Lemmon Survey	·	2.4 km	MPC · JPL
482361	2011 WF_{150}	—	February 19, 2004	Socorro	LINEAR	EUN	1.3 km	MPC · JPL
482362	2011 WH_{152}	—	August 21, 2006	Kitt Peak	Spacewatch	·	1.3 km	MPC · JPL
482363	2011 XP_{1}	—	July 3, 2005	Mount Lemmon	Mount Lemmon Survey	·	2.0 km	MPC · JPL
482364	2011 YZ_{10}	—	October 1, 2005	Catalina	CSS	EOS	1.9 km	MPC · JPL
482365	2011 YN_{12}	—	December 24, 2011	Mount Lemmon	Mount Lemmon Survey	·	2.8 km	MPC · JPL
482366	2011 YP_{13}	—	May 3, 2008	Kitt Peak	Spacewatch	·	2.5 km	MPC · JPL
482367	2011 YL_{14}	—	March 13, 2007	Catalina	CSS	·	3.0 km	MPC · JPL
482368	2011 YB_{17}	—	November 28, 2011	Mount Lemmon	Mount Lemmon Survey	·	3.6 km	MPC · JPL
482369	2011 YO_{20}	—	December 27, 2011	Mount Lemmon	Mount Lemmon Survey	·	3.4 km	MPC · JPL
482370	2011 YL_{24}	—	November 27, 2011	Mount Lemmon	Mount Lemmon Survey	·	3.3 km	MPC · JPL
482371	2011 YH_{35}	—	August 8, 2010	WISE	WISE	URS	4.7 km	MPC · JPL
482372	2011 YB_{44}	—	April 22, 2002	Kitt Peak	Spacewatch	·	2.5 km	MPC · JPL
482373	2011 YC_{47}	—	July 21, 2010	WISE	WISE	·	2.9 km	MPC · JPL
482374	2011 YC_{53}	—	December 27, 2011	Kitt Peak	Spacewatch	H	660 m	MPC · JPL
482375	2011 YJ_{60}	—	July 18, 2010	WISE	WISE	·	3.5 km	MPC · JPL
482376	2011 YC_{66}	—	November 25, 2005	Catalina	CSS	·	2.9 km	MPC · JPL
482377	2011 YF_{69}	—	December 25, 2011	Kitt Peak	Spacewatch	LIX	4.5 km	MPC · JPL
482378	2011 YS_{75}	—	December 27, 2011	Mount Lemmon	Mount Lemmon Survey	H	540 m	MPC · JPL
482379	2011 YC_{76}	—	December 28, 2011	Mount Lemmon	Mount Lemmon Survey	H	600 m	MPC · JPL
482380	2011 YS_{77}	—	December 27, 2005	Mount Lemmon	Mount Lemmon Survey	T_{j} (2.98)	3.8 km	MPC · JPL
482381	2012 AN_{3}	—	October 11, 2010	Mount Lemmon	Mount Lemmon Survey	·	2.7 km	MPC · JPL
482382	2012 AQ_{3}	—	May 15, 2008	Kitt Peak	Spacewatch	·	3.8 km	MPC · JPL
482383	2012 AZ_{3}	—	January 1, 2012	Mount Lemmon	Mount Lemmon Survey	·	3.2 km	MPC · JPL
482384	2012 AT_{7}	—	November 4, 2010	Mount Lemmon	Mount Lemmon Survey	·	3.5 km	MPC · JPL
482385	2012 AT_{8}	—	October 1, 2005	Kitt Peak	Spacewatch	·	1.8 km	MPC · JPL
482386	2012 AP_{13}	—	November 27, 2011	Mount Lemmon	Mount Lemmon Survey	URS	3.5 km	MPC · JPL
482387	2012 AD_{14}	—	August 1, 2010	WISE	WISE	·	4.3 km	MPC · JPL
482388	2012 AW_{16}	—	December 24, 2006	Mount Lemmon	Mount Lemmon Survey	H	580 m	MPC · JPL
482389	2012 AT_{18}	—	January 23, 2004	Socorro	LINEAR	H	610 m	MPC · JPL
482390	2012 AX_{19}	—	December 25, 2011	Kitt Peak	Spacewatch	·	3.0 km	MPC · JPL
482391	2012 AN_{23}	—	January 1, 2012	Mount Lemmon	Mount Lemmon Survey	AMO	570 m	MPC · JPL
482392	2012 BG_{5}	—	May 7, 2008	Mount Lemmon	Mount Lemmon Survey	VER	3.1 km	MPC · JPL
482393	2012 BR_{6}	—	October 7, 2010	Catalina	CSS	·	2.6 km	MPC · JPL
482394	2012 BH_{10}	—	December 29, 2003	Socorro	LINEAR	H	560 m	MPC · JPL
482395	2012 BN_{12}	—	January 18, 2012	Kitt Peak	Spacewatch	·	1.7 km	MPC · JPL
482396	2012 BD_{13}	—	October 29, 2005	Mount Lemmon	Mount Lemmon Survey	·	1.9 km	MPC · JPL
482397	2012 BO_{15}	—	April 6, 2008	Mount Lemmon	Mount Lemmon Survey	EOS	2.0 km	MPC · JPL
482398	2012 BV_{16}	—	December 1, 2005	Kitt Peak	Spacewatch	·	3.5 km	MPC · JPL
482399	2012 BW_{21}	—	January 25, 2007	Catalina	CSS	·	1.7 km	MPC · JPL
482400	2012 BX_{24}	—	December 28, 2011	Kitt Peak	Spacewatch	EOS	2.0 km	MPC · JPL

== 482401–482500 ==
back to top

Designation			Discovery			Properties		Ref
Permanent	Provisional	Named after	Date	Site	Discoverer(s)	Category	Diam.	Ref
482401	2012 BO_{28}	—	December 17, 2003	Socorro	LINEAR	H	490 m	MPC · JPL
482402	2012 BR_{31}	—	September 5, 2010	Bergisch Gladbach	W. Bickel	·	3.1 km	MPC · JPL
482403	2012 BD_{32}	—	December 26, 2011	Kitt Peak	Spacewatch	EOS	1.9 km	MPC · JPL
482404	2012 BO_{37}	—	December 25, 2005	Kitt Peak	Spacewatch	·	2.4 km	MPC · JPL
482405	2012 BY_{46}	—	December 30, 2011	Kitt Peak	Spacewatch	·	2.5 km	MPC · JPL
482406	2012 BD_{60}	—	December 1, 2005	Catalina	CSS	·	2.6 km	MPC · JPL
482407	2012 BS_{68}	—	January 21, 2012	Kitt Peak	Spacewatch	·	4.3 km	MPC · JPL
482408	2012 BZ_{69}	—	February 16, 2007	Mount Lemmon	Mount Lemmon Survey	·	1.9 km	MPC · JPL
482409	2012 BO_{73}	—	March 15, 2007	Catalina	CSS	·	3.7 km	MPC · JPL
482410	2012 BY_{73}	—	November 28, 2011	Mount Lemmon	Mount Lemmon Survey	·	2.4 km	MPC · JPL
482411	2012 BL_{74}	—	January 1, 2012	Mount Lemmon	Mount Lemmon Survey	·	3.3 km	MPC · JPL
482412	2012 BJ_{77}	—	January 19, 2012	Catalina	CSS	H	570 m	MPC · JPL
482413	2012 BL_{82}	—	December 25, 2005	Kitt Peak	Spacewatch	·	2.5 km	MPC · JPL
482414	2012 BK_{93}	—	January 18, 2012	Kitt Peak	Spacewatch	·	1.5 km	MPC · JPL
482415	2012 BB_{94}	—	November 5, 2010	Mount Lemmon	Mount Lemmon Survey	·	2.8 km	MPC · JPL
482416	2012 BA_{106}	—	December 10, 2005	Kitt Peak	Spacewatch	·	3.3 km	MPC · JPL
482417	2012 BH_{109}	—	January 27, 2012	Kitt Peak	Spacewatch	·	2.7 km	MPC · JPL
482418	2012 BN_{121}	—	October 31, 2010	Mount Lemmon	Mount Lemmon Survey	EOS	2.1 km	MPC · JPL
482419	2012 BB_{126}	—	January 20, 2012	Kitt Peak	Spacewatch	·	3.8 km	MPC · JPL
482420	2012 BK_{132}	—	October 27, 2005	Catalina	CSS	·	2.8 km	MPC · JPL
482421	2012 BP_{133}	—	August 1, 2010	WISE	WISE	·	4.5 km	MPC · JPL
482422	2012 BT_{136}	—	December 5, 2005	Kitt Peak	Spacewatch	THM	2.2 km	MPC · JPL
482423	2012 BN_{137}	—	December 30, 2005	Kitt Peak	Spacewatch	THM	2.1 km	MPC · JPL
482424	2012 CS_{5}	—	October 4, 2004	Kitt Peak	Spacewatch	·	2.9 km	MPC · JPL
482425	2012 CB_{8}	—	February 17, 2007	Mount Lemmon	Mount Lemmon Survey	·	1.9 km	MPC · JPL
482426	2012 CG_{9}	—	February 2, 2001	Kitt Peak	Spacewatch	·	3.2 km	MPC · JPL
482427	2012 CZ_{16}	—	March 14, 2007	Mount Lemmon	Mount Lemmon Survey	EOS	1.6 km	MPC · JPL
482428	2012 CT_{18}	—	August 17, 2009	Kitt Peak	Spacewatch	·	4.7 km	MPC · JPL
482429	2012 CK_{29}	—	January 5, 2006	Catalina	CSS	·	3.7 km	MPC · JPL
482430	2012 CV_{32}	—	June 30, 2010	WISE	WISE	·	2.6 km	MPC · JPL
482431	2012 CH_{37}	—	October 31, 2010	Kitt Peak	Spacewatch	CYB	4.2 km	MPC · JPL
482432	2012 CN_{41}	—	September 30, 2010	Kitt Peak	Spacewatch	·	2.5 km	MPC · JPL
482433	2012 CV_{51}	—	November 16, 2010	Mount Lemmon	Mount Lemmon Survey	·	2.8 km	MPC · JPL
482434	2012 CD_{53}	—	March 16, 2007	Kitt Peak	Spacewatch	·	2.6 km	MPC · JPL
482435	2012 CS_{54}	—	August 27, 2009	Kitt Peak	Spacewatch	·	2.8 km	MPC · JPL
482436	2012 CC_{56}	—	December 25, 2011	Mount Lemmon	Mount Lemmon Survey	·	1.9 km	MPC · JPL
482437	2012 DC_{4}	—	December 27, 2005	Mount Lemmon	Mount Lemmon Survey	·	2.3 km	MPC · JPL
482438	2012 DK_{5}	—	July 29, 2010	WISE	WISE	·	3.9 km	MPC · JPL
482439	2012 DM_{8}	—	February 13, 2004	Kitt Peak	Spacewatch	H	550 m	MPC · JPL
482440	2012 DS_{12}	—	February 13, 2012	Kitt Peak	Spacewatch	·	3.7 km	MPC · JPL
482441	2012 DZ_{14}	—	April 26, 2007	Mount Lemmon	Mount Lemmon Survey	·	3.9 km	MPC · JPL
482442	2012 DS_{26}	—	December 25, 2010	Kitt Peak	Spacewatch	·	3.6 km	MPC · JPL
482443	2012 DG_{28}	—	March 14, 2007	Kitt Peak	Spacewatch	H	590 m	MPC · JPL
482444	2012 DV_{29}	—	December 2, 2005	Catalina	CSS	·	2.8 km	MPC · JPL
482445	2012 DG_{36}	—	July 31, 1997	Kitt Peak	Spacewatch	H	480 m	MPC · JPL
482446	2012 DH_{38}	—	December 27, 2005	Kitt Peak	Spacewatch	·	2.7 km	MPC · JPL
482447	2012 DD_{39}	—	December 27, 2011	Mount Lemmon	Mount Lemmon Survey	H	590 m	MPC · JPL
482448	2012 DR_{55}	—	December 25, 2011	Mount Lemmon	Mount Lemmon Survey	·	2.8 km	MPC · JPL
482449	2012 DV_{58}	—	September 30, 2010	Mount Lemmon	Mount Lemmon Survey	·	1.5 km	MPC · JPL
482450	2012 DR_{61}	—	December 6, 2005	Mount Lemmon	Mount Lemmon Survey	·	3.9 km	MPC · JPL
482451	2012 DY_{62}	—	July 27, 2009	Kitt Peak	Spacewatch	EOS	1.9 km	MPC · JPL
482452	2012 DF_{79}	—	May 10, 2007	Kitt Peak	Spacewatch	·	3.3 km	MPC · JPL
482453	2012 ES_{8}	—	February 23, 2012	Mount Lemmon	Mount Lemmon Survey	·	2.7 km	MPC · JPL
482454	2012 EY_{9}	—	September 25, 2005	Kitt Peak	Spacewatch	H	590 m	MPC · JPL
482455	2012 FZ_{1}	—	March 18, 2007	Kitt Peak	Spacewatch	EOS	1.6 km	MPC · JPL
482456	2012 FL_{3}	—	December 2, 2005	Kitt Peak	Spacewatch	·	2.3 km	MPC · JPL
482457	2012 FH_{44}	—	September 21, 2003	Campo Imperatore	CINEOS	·	5.4 km	MPC · JPL
482458	2012 FA_{72}	—	December 6, 2010	Kitt Peak	Spacewatch	·	2.4 km	MPC · JPL
482459	2012 FK_{72}	—	October 25, 2009	Mount Lemmon	Mount Lemmon Survey	·	4.6 km	MPC · JPL
482460	2012 GD_{12}	—	June 8, 2007	Kitt Peak	Spacewatch	H	640 m	MPC · JPL
482461	2012 GP_{29}	—	December 27, 2005	Kitt Peak	Spacewatch	·	2.0 km	MPC · JPL
482462	2012 HB_{57}	—	March 23, 2012	Kitt Peak	Spacewatch	H	540 m	MPC · JPL
482463	2012 JL	—	April 19, 2012	Mount Lemmon	Mount Lemmon Survey	H	660 m	MPC · JPL
482464	2012 JL_{62}	—	May 14, 2012	Siding Spring	SSS	H	680 m	MPC · JPL
482465	2012 KH_{47}	—	May 30, 2012	Mount Lemmon	Mount Lemmon Survey	L5	9.2 km	MPC · JPL
482466	2012 KM_{48}	—	January 13, 2011	Mount Lemmon	Mount Lemmon Survey	·	910 m	MPC · JPL
482467	2012 LK_{9}	—	June 12, 2012	Haleakala	Pan-STARRS 1	APO +1km · PHA	900 m	MPC · JPL
482468	2012 OG_{3}	—	January 30, 2004	Kitt Peak	Spacewatch	PHO	2.7 km	MPC · JPL
482469	2012 OM_{3}	—	October 12, 2009	Mount Lemmon	Mount Lemmon Survey	·	700 m	MPC · JPL
482470	2012 PA_{26}	—	December 8, 2010	Mount Lemmon	Mount Lemmon Survey	PHO	1.3 km	MPC · JPL
482471	2012 QR_{23}	—	August 24, 2012	Kitt Peak	Spacewatch	·	790 m	MPC · JPL
482472	2012 QU_{38}	—	August 24, 2012	Kitt Peak	Spacewatch	·	770 m	MPC · JPL
482473	2012 QP_{49}	—	January 4, 2010	Kitt Peak	Spacewatch	·	680 m	MPC · JPL
482474	2012 RJ_{1}	—	September 23, 2005	Kitt Peak	Spacewatch	·	1.0 km	MPC · JPL
482475	2012 RK_{1}	—	August 28, 2001	Kitt Peak	Spacewatch	MAS	620 m	MPC · JPL
482476	2012 RC_{6}	—	September 21, 2001	Anderson Mesa	LONEOS	·	1.0 km	MPC · JPL
482477	2012 RX_{6}	—	September 11, 2001	Anderson Mesa	LONEOS	·	1.1 km	MPC · JPL
482478	2012 RM_{8}	—	June 13, 2005	Mount Lemmon	Mount Lemmon Survey	·	720 m	MPC · JPL
482479	2012 RJ_{14}	—	November 19, 2001	Anderson Mesa	LONEOS	·	1.1 km	MPC · JPL
482480	2012 RM_{18}	—	December 24, 2005	Socorro	LINEAR	·	980 m	MPC · JPL
482481	2012 RU_{22}	—	July 30, 2008	Mount Lemmon	Mount Lemmon Survey	·	1.0 km	MPC · JPL
482482	2012 RY_{23}	—	October 27, 2008	Mount Lemmon	Mount Lemmon Survey	PHO	960 m	MPC · JPL
482483	2012 RC_{32}	—	March 10, 2011	Kitt Peak	Spacewatch	·	780 m	MPC · JPL
482484	2012 RU_{40}	—	October 30, 2005	Mount Lemmon	Mount Lemmon Survey	·	1.1 km	MPC · JPL
482485	2012 RC_{43}	—	September 15, 2012	Catalina	CSS	V	590 m	MPC · JPL
482486	2012 SP_{9}	—	September 12, 2001	Socorro	LINEAR	MAS	780 m	MPC · JPL
482487	2012 SY_{12}	—	September 17, 2012	Kitt Peak	Spacewatch	·	1.2 km	MPC · JPL
482488	2012 SW_{20}	—	September 18, 2012	Catalina	CSS	APO · PHA	390 m	MPC · JPL
482489	2012 SF_{26}	—	December 6, 2005	Kitt Peak	Spacewatch	·	890 m	MPC · JPL
482490	2012 SW_{27}	—	December 25, 2005	Kitt Peak	Spacewatch	·	930 m	MPC · JPL
482491	2012 SW_{38}	—	October 14, 2001	Socorro	LINEAR	·	970 m	MPC · JPL
482492	2012 SX_{54}	—	August 28, 2012	Mount Lemmon	Mount Lemmon Survey	V	530 m	MPC · JPL
482493	2012 SD_{56}	—	February 16, 2010	Kitt Peak	Spacewatch	·	910 m	MPC · JPL
482494	2012 SJ_{66}	—	June 8, 2008	Kitt Peak	Spacewatch	·	1.4 km	MPC · JPL
482495	2012 TM_{1}	—	September 18, 1995	Kitt Peak	Spacewatch	·	640 m	MPC · JPL
482496	2012 TV_{2}	—	July 30, 2008	Mount Lemmon	Mount Lemmon Survey	MAS	630 m	MPC · JPL
482497	2012 TN_{6}	—	November 18, 2001	Kitt Peak	Spacewatch	·	1.1 km	MPC · JPL
482498	2012 TO_{12}	—	October 23, 2001	Socorro	LINEAR	·	1.0 km	MPC · JPL
482499	2012 TR_{12}	—	December 18, 2001	Socorro	LINEAR	NYS	1.1 km	MPC · JPL
482500	2012 TO_{21}	—	October 11, 1997	Kitt Peak	Spacewatch	MAS	710 m	MPC · JPL

== 482501–482600 ==
back to top

Designation			Discovery			Properties		Ref
Permanent	Provisional	Named after	Date	Site	Discoverer(s)	Category	Diam.	Ref
482501	2012 TQ_{25}	—	February 15, 2010	Mount Lemmon	Mount Lemmon Survey	MAS	610 m	MPC · JPL
482502	2012 TX_{33}	—	September 14, 2012	Catalina	CSS	·	1.1 km	MPC · JPL
482503	2012 TA_{35}	—	September 3, 2008	Kitt Peak	Spacewatch	·	940 m	MPC · JPL
482504	2012 TW_{68}	—	October 8, 2008	Kitt Peak	Spacewatch	·	970 m	MPC · JPL
482505	2012 TQ_{78}	—	October 6, 2012	Haleakala	Pan-STARRS 1	APO	440 m	MPC · JPL
482506	2012 TE_{86}	—	March 13, 2007	Kitt Peak	Spacewatch	·	1.2 km	MPC · JPL
482507	2012 TE_{104}	—	November 1, 2005	Kitt Peak	Spacewatch	·	740 m	MPC · JPL
482508	2012 TM_{104}	—	October 9, 2012	Mount Lemmon	Mount Lemmon Survey	·	1.2 km	MPC · JPL
482509	2012 TT_{115}	—	September 3, 2008	Kitt Peak	Spacewatch	·	1.4 km	MPC · JPL
482510	2012 TP_{131}	—	January 4, 2006	Mount Lemmon	Mount Lemmon Survey	·	1.2 km	MPC · JPL
482511	2012 TH_{134}	—	February 25, 2011	Mount Lemmon	Mount Lemmon Survey	·	850 m	MPC · JPL
482512	2012 TO_{134}	—	July 30, 2008	Mount Lemmon	Mount Lemmon Survey	MAS	570 m	MPC · JPL
482513	2012 TV_{148}	—	October 24, 2008	Kitt Peak	Spacewatch	MAR	860 m	MPC · JPL
482514	2012 TH_{154}	—	April 3, 2008	Mount Lemmon	Mount Lemmon Survey	L5	7.7 km	MPC · JPL
482515	2012 TD_{155}	—	September 18, 2012	Kitt Peak	Spacewatch	·	1.0 km	MPC · JPL
482516	2012 TC_{159}	—	December 4, 2005	Kitt Peak	Spacewatch	·	1.1 km	MPC · JPL
482517	2012 TC_{162}	—	July 30, 2008	Kitt Peak	Spacewatch	·	1.1 km	MPC · JPL
482518	2012 TX_{165}	—	November 29, 2005	Kitt Peak	Spacewatch	·	850 m	MPC · JPL
482519	2012 TB_{167}	—	December 4, 2008	Catalina	CSS	·	1.9 km	MPC · JPL
482520	2012 TR_{189}	—	November 5, 2005	Kitt Peak	Spacewatch	MAS	600 m	MPC · JPL
482521	2012 TU_{196}	—	October 10, 2012	Mount Lemmon	Mount Lemmon Survey	·	1.7 km	MPC · JPL
482522	2012 TR_{206}	—	October 24, 2005	Kitt Peak	Spacewatch	·	1.0 km	MPC · JPL
482523	2012 TK_{219}	—	March 26, 2011	Mount Lemmon	Mount Lemmon Survey	PHO	900 m	MPC · JPL
482524	2012 TE_{224}	—	December 6, 2005	Kitt Peak	Spacewatch	CLA	1.3 km	MPC · JPL
482525	2012 TT_{226}	—	September 30, 2005	Mount Lemmon	Mount Lemmon Survey	V	620 m	MPC · JPL
482526	2012 TF_{267}	—	September 29, 2008	Catalina	CSS	·	1.1 km	MPC · JPL
482527	2012 TE_{288}	—	October 10, 2012	Mount Lemmon	Mount Lemmon Survey	·	740 m	MPC · JPL
482528	2012 TF_{301}	—	February 14, 2010	Mount Lemmon	Mount Lemmon Survey	V	640 m	MPC · JPL
482529	2012 TK_{310}	—	December 27, 2005	Kitt Peak	Spacewatch	PHO	1.1 km	MPC · JPL
482530	2012 TG_{314}	—	October 14, 2012	Catalina	CSS	·	1.4 km	MPC · JPL
482531	2012 TB_{322}	—	September 19, 2008	Kitt Peak	Spacewatch	·	1.1 km	MPC · JPL
482532	2012 UQ	—	November 2, 1997	Kitt Peak	Spacewatch	·	850 m	MPC · JPL
482533	2012 UA_{34}	—	October 17, 2012	Haleakala	Pan-STARRS 1	ATE	390 m	MPC · JPL
482534	2012 UL_{35}	—	December 5, 2005	Mount Lemmon	Mount Lemmon Survey	·	900 m	MPC · JPL
482535	2012 UR_{43}	—	September 6, 2008	Kitt Peak	Spacewatch	·	870 m	MPC · JPL
482536	2012 UQ_{45}	—	November 25, 2005	Mount Lemmon	Mount Lemmon Survey	·	810 m	MPC · JPL
482537	2012 UB_{52}	—	September 22, 2008	Kitt Peak	Spacewatch	·	1.2 km	MPC · JPL
482538	2012 UG_{55}	—	September 22, 2008	Catalina	CSS	·	1.2 km	MPC · JPL
482539	2012 UZ_{66}	—	September 4, 2008	Kitt Peak	Spacewatch	·	970 m	MPC · JPL
482540	2012 UA_{70}	—	September 27, 2008	Catalina	CSS	·	1.7 km	MPC · JPL
482541	2012 UR_{76}	—	February 8, 2010	Kitt Peak	Spacewatch	NYS	1.3 km	MPC · JPL
482542	2012 UF_{84}	—	November 3, 2008	Mount Lemmon	Mount Lemmon Survey	·	890 m	MPC · JPL
482543	2012 UU_{107}	—	January 7, 2006	Kitt Peak	Spacewatch	MAS	570 m	MPC · JPL
482544	2012 UZ_{130}	—	November 20, 2001	Kitt Peak	Spacewatch	·	990 m	MPC · JPL
482545	2012 UV_{131}	—	December 25, 2005	Mount Lemmon	Mount Lemmon Survey	·	1.2 km	MPC · JPL
482546	2012 UY_{132}	—	December 24, 2005	Socorro	LINEAR	·	1.6 km	MPC · JPL
482547	2012 UP_{133}	—	November 19, 2001	Socorro	LINEAR	·	1.2 km	MPC · JPL
482548	2012 UF_{141}	—	February 24, 2006	Kitt Peak	Spacewatch	·	1.1 km	MPC · JPL
482549	2012 UK_{168}	—	November 20, 2001	Socorro	LINEAR	·	1.0 km	MPC · JPL
482550	2012 UV_{171}	—	August 21, 2008	Kitt Peak	Spacewatch	·	960 m	MPC · JPL
482551	2012 VH_{9}	—	July 29, 2008	Kitt Peak	Spacewatch	·	1.1 km	MPC · JPL
482552	2012 VV_{10}	—	November 25, 2005	Mount Lemmon	Mount Lemmon Survey	·	1.5 km	MPC · JPL
482553	2012 VE_{25}	—	May 30, 2008	Mount Lemmon	Mount Lemmon Survey	·	1.1 km	MPC · JPL
482554	2012 VW_{36}	—	November 5, 2010	Catalina	CSS	·	530 m	MPC · JPL
482555	2012 VP_{43}	—	October 27, 2012	Mount Lemmon	Mount Lemmon Survey	·	1.7 km	MPC · JPL
482556	2012 VG_{52}	—	December 21, 2008	Catalina	CSS	·	960 m	MPC · JPL
482557	2012 VL_{54}	—	October 6, 2008	Kitt Peak	Spacewatch	·	1.2 km	MPC · JPL
482558	2012 VU_{64}	—	December 4, 2005	Kitt Peak	Spacewatch	NYS	1.0 km	MPC · JPL
482559	2012 VS_{70}	—	December 17, 2001	Kitt Peak	Spacewatch	·	1.2 km	MPC · JPL
482560	2012 VF_{71}	—	November 20, 2008	Kitt Peak	Spacewatch	·	880 m	MPC · JPL
482561	2012 VZ_{79}	—	September 21, 2008	Mount Lemmon	Mount Lemmon Survey	NYS	930 m	MPC · JPL
482562	2012 VN_{82}	—	November 13, 2012	Mount Lemmon	Mount Lemmon Survey	APO	350 m	MPC · JPL
482563	2012 VR_{84}	—	September 25, 2008	Kitt Peak	Spacewatch	NYS	1.1 km	MPC · JPL
482564	2012 VE_{90}	—	September 6, 2008	Catalina	CSS	NYS	960 m	MPC · JPL
482565	2012 VN_{98}	—	November 16, 2001	Kitt Peak	Spacewatch	NYS	1.0 km	MPC · JPL
482566	2012 WK_{4}	—	November 19, 2012	Siding Spring	SSS	APO	180 m	MPC · JPL
482567	2012 WH_{6}	—	November 30, 2008	Kitt Peak	Spacewatch	·	1.1 km	MPC · JPL
482568	2012 WL_{7}	—	September 20, 2008	Kitt Peak	Spacewatch	V	670 m	MPC · JPL
482569	2012 WO_{7}	—	November 17, 2008	Kitt Peak	Spacewatch	·	860 m	MPC · JPL
482570	2012 WP_{16}	—	December 2, 2004	Kitt Peak	Spacewatch	·	870 m	MPC · JPL
482571	2012 WT_{16}	—	November 22, 2012	Kitt Peak	Spacewatch	·	1.4 km	MPC · JPL
482572	2012 WW_{23}	—	October 31, 2008	Mount Lemmon	Mount Lemmon Survey	·	1.7 km	MPC · JPL
482573	2012 WL_{24}	—	January 18, 2002	Kitt Peak	Spacewatch	·	1.6 km	MPC · JPL
482574	2012 WE_{27}	—	December 30, 2008	Kitt Peak	Spacewatch	·	1.1 km	MPC · JPL
482575	2012 WY_{32}	—	November 1, 2008	Mount Lemmon	Mount Lemmon Survey	·	1.8 km	MPC · JPL
482576	2012 XO_{28}	—	January 3, 2009	Kitt Peak	Spacewatch	·	920 m	MPC · JPL
482577	2012 XV_{36}	—	November 20, 2008	Kitt Peak	Spacewatch	·	1.1 km	MPC · JPL
482578	2012 XK_{38}	—	December 5, 2008	Kitt Peak	Spacewatch	·	700 m	MPC · JPL
482579	2012 XR_{40}	—	December 3, 2012	Mount Lemmon	Mount Lemmon Survey	·	960 m	MPC · JPL
482580	2012 XH_{43}	—	November 28, 1999	Kitt Peak	Spacewatch	·	2.2 km	MPC · JPL
482581	2012 XO_{43}	—	November 24, 2008	Kitt Peak	Spacewatch	EUN	1.0 km	MPC · JPL
482582	2012 XA_{46}	—	January 22, 2010	WISE	WISE	·	3.4 km	MPC · JPL
482583	2012 XM_{48}	—	December 15, 2004	Kitt Peak	Spacewatch	(5)	760 m	MPC · JPL
482584	2012 XA_{53}	—	November 13, 2012	Mount Lemmon	Mount Lemmon Survey	·	1.8 km	MPC · JPL
482585	2012 XC_{53}	—	December 6, 2012	Kitt Peak	Spacewatch	·	1.4 km	MPC · JPL
482586	2012 XH_{57}	—	October 28, 2008	Mount Lemmon	Mount Lemmon Survey	NYS	950 m	MPC · JPL
482587	2012 XE_{84}	—	December 19, 2003	Kitt Peak	Spacewatch	·	1.3 km	MPC · JPL
482588	2012 XP_{88}	—	September 25, 2012	Mount Lemmon	Mount Lemmon Survey	·	1.6 km	MPC · JPL
482589	2012 XX_{93}	—	October 8, 2008	Kitt Peak	Spacewatch	·	980 m	MPC · JPL
482590	2012 XP_{94}	—	December 4, 2008	Kitt Peak	Spacewatch	·	1.5 km	MPC · JPL
482591	2012 XL_{105}	—	April 27, 2010	WISE	WISE	·	4.1 km	MPC · JPL
482592	2012 XE_{106}	—	January 28, 2009	Catalina	CSS	·	2.1 km	MPC · JPL
482593	2012 XJ_{109}	—	January 13, 2005	Kitt Peak	Spacewatch	(5)	980 m	MPC · JPL
482594	2012 XJ_{117}	—	October 1, 2008	Kitt Peak	Spacewatch	·	1.5 km	MPC · JPL
482595	2012 XH_{119}	—	June 22, 2010	Mount Lemmon	Mount Lemmon Survey	·	2.1 km	MPC · JPL
482596	2012 XZ_{119}	—	December 8, 2012	Kitt Peak	Spacewatch	·	1.3 km	MPC · JPL
482597	2012 XB_{130}	—	November 5, 2012	Kitt Peak	Spacewatch	·	810 m	MPC · JPL
482598	2012 XN_{135}	—	January 16, 2009	Socorro	LINEAR	·	1.6 km	MPC · JPL
482599	2012 XB_{145}	—	December 11, 2012	Kitt Peak	Spacewatch	·	1.7 km	MPC · JPL
482600	2012 XV_{145}	—	November 26, 2012	Mount Lemmon	Mount Lemmon Survey	·	1.1 km	MPC · JPL

== 482601–482700 ==
back to top

Designation			Discovery			Properties		Ref
Permanent	Provisional	Named after	Date	Site	Discoverer(s)	Category	Diam.	Ref
482601	2012 XO_{152}	—	February 19, 2009	Catalina	CSS	JUN	1 km	MPC · JPL
482602	2012 YL_{4}	—	January 31, 2009	Mount Lemmon	Mount Lemmon Survey	·	1.7 km	MPC · JPL
482603	2012 YQ_{4}	—	January 18, 2009	Mount Lemmon	Mount Lemmon Survey	·	1.2 km	MPC · JPL
482604	2013 AL_{3}	—	May 7, 2005	Catalina	CSS	·	2.5 km	MPC · JPL
482605	2013 AT_{3}	—	September 8, 1999	Kitt Peak	Spacewatch	·	1.0 km	MPC · JPL
482606	2013 AQ_{5}	—	December 14, 2004	Socorro	LINEAR	EUN	1.3 km	MPC · JPL
482607	2013 AJ_{9}	—	March 17, 2009	Kitt Peak	Spacewatch	MRX	1.2 km	MPC · JPL
482608	2013 AB_{12}	—	January 20, 2009	Mount Lemmon	Mount Lemmon Survey	·	1.6 km	MPC · JPL
482609	2013 AE_{13}	—	February 27, 2009	Catalina	CSS	·	1.3 km	MPC · JPL
482610	2013 AW_{18}	—	February 20, 2009	Siding Spring	SSS	·	1.7 km	MPC · JPL
482611	2013 AT_{19}	—	January 16, 2009	Kitt Peak	Spacewatch	·	1.2 km	MPC · JPL
482612	2013 AB_{21}	—	January 1, 2009	Mount Lemmon	Mount Lemmon Survey	·	870 m	MPC · JPL
482613	2013 AY_{21}	—	February 1, 1997	Kitt Peak	Spacewatch	·	820 m	MPC · JPL
482614	2013 AB_{22}	—	November 19, 2007	Mount Lemmon	Mount Lemmon Survey	·	1.7 km	MPC · JPL
482615	2013 AB_{23}	—	December 22, 2008	Kitt Peak	Spacewatch	·	810 m	MPC · JPL
482616	2013 AM_{26}	—	March 22, 2010	WISE	WISE	·	3.2 km	MPC · JPL
482617	2013 AK_{35}	—	April 6, 2005	Mount Lemmon	Mount Lemmon Survey	·	1.0 km	MPC · JPL
482618	2013 AQ_{35}	—	September 29, 2011	Mount Lemmon	Mount Lemmon Survey	·	1.6 km	MPC · JPL
482619	2013 AE_{36}	—	December 30, 2008	Mount Lemmon	Mount Lemmon Survey	·	1.9 km	MPC · JPL
482620	2013 AZ_{38}	—	January 5, 2013	Kitt Peak	Spacewatch	·	1.4 km	MPC · JPL
482621	2013 AJ_{43}	—	January 19, 2009	Mount Lemmon	Mount Lemmon Survey	·	980 m	MPC · JPL
482622	2013 AU_{48}	—	April 5, 2010	Kitt Peak	Spacewatch	·	1.3 km	MPC · JPL
482623	2013 AK_{53}	—	April 19, 2009	Mount Lemmon	Mount Lemmon Survey	·	1.8 km	MPC · JPL
482624	2013 AR_{53}	—	September 20, 2007	Catalina	CSS	·	1.6 km	MPC · JPL
482625	2013 AM_{56}	—	November 13, 2007	Mount Lemmon	Mount Lemmon Survey	·	1.9 km	MPC · JPL
482626	2013 AD_{57}	—	January 6, 2013	Kitt Peak	Spacewatch	·	1.6 km	MPC · JPL
482627	2013 AK_{61}	—	December 8, 2012	Kitt Peak	Spacewatch	·	1.6 km	MPC · JPL
482628	2013 AM_{69}	—	January 31, 2009	Mount Lemmon	Mount Lemmon Survey	·	1.2 km	MPC · JPL
482629	2013 AX_{69}	—	February 1, 1995	Kitt Peak	Spacewatch	PAD	1.5 km	MPC · JPL
482630	2013 AN_{73}	—	November 22, 2006	Kitt Peak	Spacewatch	·	4.0 km	MPC · JPL
482631	2013 AM_{75}	—	December 22, 2008	Catalina	CSS	·	1.4 km	MPC · JPL
482632	2013 AN_{79}	—	December 22, 2008	Kitt Peak	Spacewatch	·	880 m	MPC · JPL
482633	2013 AE_{80}	—	January 15, 2005	Kitt Peak	Spacewatch	·	870 m	MPC · JPL
482634	2013 AJ_{84}	—	November 12, 2007	Mount Lemmon	Mount Lemmon Survey	·	1.4 km	MPC · JPL
482635	2013 AQ_{84}	—	October 29, 2003	Kitt Peak	Spacewatch	MIS	2.0 km	MPC · JPL
482636	2013 AD_{85}	—	September 22, 2011	Kitt Peak	Spacewatch	·	1.8 km	MPC · JPL
482637	2013 AB_{89}	—	October 20, 2012	Mount Lemmon	Mount Lemmon Survey	·	1.5 km	MPC · JPL
482638	2013 AK_{94}	—	February 9, 2005	Mount Lemmon	Mount Lemmon Survey	·	1.3 km	MPC · JPL
482639	2013 AH_{105}	—	June 26, 2011	Mount Lemmon	Mount Lemmon Survey	·	1.7 km	MPC · JPL
482640	2013 AZ_{110}	—	December 30, 2008	Mount Lemmon	Mount Lemmon Survey	·	1.2 km	MPC · JPL
482641	2013 AR_{115}	—	November 3, 2007	Kitt Peak	Spacewatch	·	1.6 km	MPC · JPL
482642	2013 AV_{115}	—	December 11, 2012	Mount Lemmon	Mount Lemmon Survey	·	1.4 km	MPC · JPL
482643	2013 AB_{118}	—	October 24, 2008	Mount Lemmon	Mount Lemmon Survey	·	890 m	MPC · JPL
482644	2013 AO_{123}	—	October 5, 1999	Socorro	LINEAR	·	1.3 km	MPC · JPL
482645	2013 AZ_{125}	—	January 4, 2013	Siding Spring	SSS	JUN	1.2 km	MPC · JPL
482646	2013 AK_{126}	—	September 12, 2004	Socorro	LINEAR	·	1.7 km	MPC · JPL
482647	2013 AV_{129}	—	January 3, 2013	Mount Lemmon	Mount Lemmon Survey	·	1.3 km	MPC · JPL
482648	2013 BA_{4}	—	February 22, 2009	Kitt Peak	Spacewatch	·	1.7 km	MPC · JPL
482649	2013 BF_{13}	—	October 23, 2003	Kitt Peak	Spacewatch	·	1.2 km	MPC · JPL
482650	2013 BK_{18}	—	January 16, 2013	Haleakala	Pan-STARRS 1	APO · PHA	410 m	MPC · JPL
482651	2013 BT_{39}	—	December 22, 2008	Mount Lemmon	Mount Lemmon Survey	·	820 m	MPC · JPL
482652	2013 BE_{40}	—	January 18, 2013	Mount Lemmon	Mount Lemmon Survey	·	1.6 km	MPC · JPL
482653	2013 BB_{49}	—	October 20, 2011	Mount Lemmon	Mount Lemmon Survey	·	1.8 km	MPC · JPL
482654	2013 BF_{52}	—	March 4, 2005	Mount Lemmon	Mount Lemmon Survey	·	1.7 km	MPC · JPL
482655	2013 BH_{56}	—	January 5, 2013	Mount Lemmon	Mount Lemmon Survey	·	1.5 km	MPC · JPL
482656	2013 BD_{57}	—	October 15, 2007	Catalina	CSS	·	1.5 km	MPC · JPL
482657	2013 BJ_{57}	—	January 5, 2013	Mount Lemmon	Mount Lemmon Survey	·	1.6 km	MPC · JPL
482658	2013 BK_{58}	—	October 12, 2007	Mount Lemmon	Mount Lemmon Survey	ADE	1.8 km	MPC · JPL
482659	2013 BV_{58}	—	February 3, 2009	Mount Lemmon	Mount Lemmon Survey	·	1.1 km	MPC · JPL
482660	2013 BM_{64}	—	February 1, 2009	Kitt Peak	Spacewatch	·	1.1 km	MPC · JPL
482661	2013 BT_{64}	—	February 4, 2009	Mount Lemmon	Mount Lemmon Survey	·	860 m	MPC · JPL
482662	2013 BT_{66}	—	September 27, 2011	Mount Lemmon	Mount Lemmon Survey	·	1.6 km	MPC · JPL
482663	2013 BJ_{73}	—	January 8, 2000	Socorro	LINEAR	·	1.9 km	MPC · JPL
482664	2013 BV_{78}	—	December 13, 2012	Mount Lemmon	Mount Lemmon Survey	EUN	1.2 km	MPC · JPL
482665	2013 BT_{80}	—	November 11, 2004	Kitt Peak	Spacewatch	·	1.5 km	MPC · JPL
482666	2013 CV_{5}	—	November 9, 2007	Kitt Peak	Spacewatch	·	1.3 km	MPC · JPL
482667	2013 CQ_{10}	—	October 23, 2011	Mount Lemmon	Mount Lemmon Survey	EOS	1.7 km	MPC · JPL
482668	2013 CW_{11}	—	January 19, 2013	Kitt Peak	Spacewatch	·	1.0 km	MPC · JPL
482669	2013 CQ_{16}	—	January 17, 2013	Mount Lemmon	Mount Lemmon Survey	·	2.1 km	MPC · JPL
482670	2013 CM_{19}	—	February 27, 2009	Catalina	CSS	·	1.8 km	MPC · JPL
482671	2013 CX_{22}	—	December 30, 2008	Kitt Peak	Spacewatch	·	1.4 km	MPC · JPL
482672	2013 CQ_{24}	—	September 7, 1999	Catalina	CSS	·	1.8 km	MPC · JPL
482673	2013 CU_{27}	—	November 20, 2007	Kitt Peak	Spacewatch	·	1.4 km	MPC · JPL
482674	2013 CT_{48}	—	January 19, 2013	Kitt Peak	Spacewatch	·	1.1 km	MPC · JPL
482675	2013 CX_{50}	—	November 2, 2007	Mount Lemmon	Mount Lemmon Survey	MRX	770 m	MPC · JPL
482676	2013 CW_{52}	—	December 29, 2003	Catalina	CSS	·	1.3 km	MPC · JPL
482677	2013 CS_{54}	—	March 3, 2009	Catalina	CSS	·	1.3 km	MPC · JPL
482678	2013 CV_{63}	—	April 20, 2009	Mount Lemmon	Mount Lemmon Survey	·	1.9 km	MPC · JPL
482679	2013 CC_{65}	—	January 30, 2009	Mount Lemmon	Mount Lemmon Survey	·	1.2 km	MPC · JPL
482680	2013 CW_{65}	—	January 17, 2013	Mount Lemmon	Mount Lemmon Survey	BRA	1.6 km	MPC · JPL
482681	2013 CW_{66}	—	February 1, 2009	Mount Lemmon	Mount Lemmon Survey	·	1.4 km	MPC · JPL
482682	2013 CD_{67}	—	March 1, 2009	Kitt Peak	Spacewatch	EUN	1.0 km	MPC · JPL
482683	2013 CN_{67}	—	September 4, 1999	Kitt Peak	Spacewatch	·	910 m	MPC · JPL
482684	2013 CD_{68}	—	April 2, 2009	Mount Lemmon	Mount Lemmon Survey	·	1.3 km	MPC · JPL
482685	2013 CN_{68}	—	October 10, 1999	Kitt Peak	Spacewatch	(5)	920 m	MPC · JPL
482686	2013 CB_{71}	—	January 18, 2009	Kitt Peak	Spacewatch	·	970 m	MPC · JPL
482687	2013 CG_{71}	—	January 7, 2000	Kitt Peak	Spacewatch	·	1.3 km	MPC · JPL
482688	2013 CU_{77}	—	April 2, 2005	Kitt Peak	Spacewatch	·	1.1 km	MPC · JPL
482689	2013 CO_{79}	—	January 8, 2013	Kitt Peak	Spacewatch	·	2.1 km	MPC · JPL
482690	2013 CZ_{90}	—	April 1, 2009	Kitt Peak	Spacewatch	·	1.9 km	MPC · JPL
482691	2013 CX_{101}	—	February 10, 1996	Kitt Peak	Spacewatch	·	1.4 km	MPC · JPL
482692	2013 CP_{112}	—	January 20, 2013	Kitt Peak	Spacewatch	·	2.4 km	MPC · JPL
482693	2013 CJ_{114}	—	November 1, 2007	Kitt Peak	Spacewatch	AEO	1.2 km	MPC · JPL
482694	2013 CN_{121}	—	March 3, 2009	Mount Lemmon	Mount Lemmon Survey	(5)	940 m	MPC · JPL
482695	2013 CK_{124}	—	March 1, 2009	Mount Lemmon	Mount Lemmon Survey	·	1.7 km	MPC · JPL
482696	2013 CL_{124}	—	January 5, 2013	Mount Lemmon	Mount Lemmon Survey	·	1.1 km	MPC · JPL
482697	2013 CB_{134}	—	March 27, 2010	WISE	WISE	·	3.6 km	MPC · JPL
482698	2013 CF_{135}	—	April 3, 2008	Kitt Peak	Spacewatch	·	2.7 km	MPC · JPL
482699	2013 CO_{136}	—	September 20, 2011	Kitt Peak	Spacewatch	·	1.6 km	MPC · JPL
482700	2013 CT_{137}	—	February 24, 2008	Mount Lemmon	Mount Lemmon Survey	·	2.4 km	MPC · JPL

== 482701–482800 ==
back to top

Designation			Discovery			Properties		Ref
Permanent	Provisional	Named after	Date	Site	Discoverer(s)	Category	Diam.	Ref
482701	2013 CV_{140}	—	January 22, 2004	Socorro	LINEAR	·	2.6 km	MPC · JPL
482702	2013 CC_{155}	—	August 28, 2006	Kitt Peak	Spacewatch	·	2.1 km	MPC · JPL
482703	2013 CQ_{184}	—	April 18, 2009	Catalina	CSS	·	1.8 km	MPC · JPL
482704	2013 CL_{186}	—	December 14, 2007	Mount Lemmon	Mount Lemmon Survey	·	2.3 km	MPC · JPL
482705	2013 CX_{190}	—	April 22, 2009	Mount Lemmon	Mount Lemmon Survey	EUN	1.1 km	MPC · JPL
482706	2013 CG_{193}	—	December 7, 1999	Kitt Peak	Spacewatch	·	1.0 km	MPC · JPL
482707	2013 CV_{202}	—	January 17, 2013	Mount Lemmon	Mount Lemmon Survey	·	1.3 km	MPC · JPL
482708	2013 CU_{203}	—	October 6, 2005	Mount Lemmon	Mount Lemmon Survey	·	2.0 km	MPC · JPL
482709	2013 CF_{208}	—	January 9, 2013	Mount Lemmon	Mount Lemmon Survey	·	1.0 km	MPC · JPL
482710	2013 CS_{214}	—	March 10, 2008	Kitt Peak	Spacewatch	·	2.0 km	MPC · JPL
482711	2013 DJ	—	October 24, 2007	Mount Lemmon	Mount Lemmon Survey	·	1.5 km	MPC · JPL
482712	2013 DX_{2}	—	October 8, 2007	Mount Lemmon	Mount Lemmon Survey	·	1.3 km	MPC · JPL
482713	2013 DE_{8}	—	April 21, 2009	Mount Lemmon	Mount Lemmon Survey	·	1.7 km	MPC · JPL
482714	2013 DL_{9}	—	September 1, 2010	Mount Lemmon	Mount Lemmon Survey	·	1.8 km	MPC · JPL
482715	2013 DO_{9}	—	November 11, 2007	Mount Lemmon	Mount Lemmon Survey	·	2.2 km	MPC · JPL
482716	2013 DR_{10}	—	May 11, 2010	WISE	WISE	·	3.7 km	MPC · JPL
482717	2013 DU_{15}	—	February 18, 2004	Kitt Peak	Spacewatch	·	1.3 km	MPC · JPL
482718	2013 ET_{9}	—	October 15, 2002	Palomar	NEAT	AMO	210 m	MPC · JPL
482719	2013 EO_{18}	—	February 16, 2004	Kitt Peak	Spacewatch	·	1.1 km	MPC · JPL
482720	2013 EP_{18}	—	April 2, 2009	Kitt Peak	Spacewatch	·	1.6 km	MPC · JPL
482721	2013 EA_{22}	—	March 5, 2013	Mount Lemmon	Mount Lemmon Survey	·	2.4 km	MPC · JPL
482722	2013 EN_{30}	—	January 15, 2008	Mount Lemmon	Mount Lemmon Survey	DOR	1.9 km	MPC · JPL
482723	2013 ES_{30}	—	March 7, 2013	Mount Lemmon	Mount Lemmon Survey	·	3.2 km	MPC · JPL
482724	2013 EO_{32}	—	March 4, 2008	Mount Lemmon	Mount Lemmon Survey	·	1.5 km	MPC · JPL
482725	2013 EW_{35}	—	February 4, 2009	Mount Lemmon	Mount Lemmon Survey	·	1.2 km	MPC · JPL
482726	2013 EM_{40}	—	January 14, 2013	Catalina	CSS	·	1.1 km	MPC · JPL
482727	2013 EJ_{57}	—	October 7, 2005	Mount Lemmon	Mount Lemmon Survey	·	2.0 km	MPC · JPL
482728	2013 EE_{64}	—	February 11, 2000	Kitt Peak	Spacewatch	·	1.3 km	MPC · JPL
482729	2013 EG_{79}	—	September 18, 2011	Mount Lemmon	Mount Lemmon Survey	JUN	760 m	MPC · JPL
482730	2013 EA_{84}	—	March 10, 2008	Mount Lemmon	Mount Lemmon Survey	·	2.0 km	MPC · JPL
482731	2013 EB_{84}	—	December 18, 2007	Mount Lemmon	Mount Lemmon Survey	·	1.5 km	MPC · JPL
482732	2013 EV_{86}	—	April 4, 2008	Kitt Peak	Spacewatch	·	2.4 km	MPC · JPL
482733	2013 EP_{87}	—	April 7, 2008	Kitt Peak	Spacewatch	EOS	2.0 km	MPC · JPL
482734	2013 EH_{90}	—	March 26, 2004	Kitt Peak	Spacewatch	·	2.0 km	MPC · JPL
482735	2013 EK_{93}	—	June 17, 1996	Kitt Peak	Spacewatch	·	1.6 km	MPC · JPL
482736	2013 EQ_{99}	—	December 29, 2003	Kitt Peak	Spacewatch	MIS	2.4 km	MPC · JPL
482737	2013 EZ_{102}	—	January 23, 2004	Anderson Mesa	LONEOS	·	1.5 km	MPC · JPL
482738	2013 EX_{105}	—	January 17, 2013	Mount Lemmon	Mount Lemmon Survey	EOS	1.9 km	MPC · JPL
482739	2013 EO_{112}	—	April 26, 2008	Kitt Peak	Spacewatch	·	3.2 km	MPC · JPL
482740	2013 EB_{114}	—	March 12, 2008	Kitt Peak	Spacewatch	·	2.3 km	MPC · JPL
482741	2013 EA_{121}	—	September 22, 2011	Kitt Peak	Spacewatch	·	1.4 km	MPC · JPL
482742	2013 EB_{121}	—	September 30, 2005	Kitt Peak	Spacewatch	·	1.5 km	MPC · JPL
482743	2013 ED_{123}	—	March 18, 2013	Kitt Peak	Spacewatch	·	3.2 km	MPC · JPL
482744	2013 EW_{126}	—	April 30, 2008	Mount Lemmon	Mount Lemmon Survey	·	2.5 km	MPC · JPL
482745	2013 EX_{126}	—	March 7, 2013	Siding Spring	SSS	·	1.9 km	MPC · JPL
482746	2013 EM_{128}	—	November 9, 2007	Kitt Peak	Spacewatch	·	1.8 km	MPC · JPL
482747	2013 FV	—	September 24, 2007	Kitt Peak	Spacewatch	(5)	990 m	MPC · JPL
482748	2013 FK_{2}	—	May 14, 2008	Kitt Peak	Spacewatch	·	2.7 km	MPC · JPL
482749	2013 FB_{4}	—	February 24, 2009	Mount Lemmon	Mount Lemmon Survey	·	1.4 km	MPC · JPL
482750	2013 FQ_{5}	—	October 28, 2005	Kitt Peak	Spacewatch	·	2.6 km	MPC · JPL
482751	2013 FZ_{6}	—	September 1, 2005	Kitt Peak	Spacewatch	KOR	1.6 km	MPC · JPL
482752	2013 FW_{9}	—	March 15, 2004	Kitt Peak	Spacewatch	·	1.4 km	MPC · JPL
482753	2013 FO_{13}	—	March 18, 2004	Kitt Peak	Spacewatch	·	2.2 km	MPC · JPL
482754	2013 GM_{6}	—	June 13, 2009	Kitt Peak	Spacewatch	·	1.6 km	MPC · JPL
482755	2013 GQ_{14}	—	May 3, 2008	Mount Lemmon	Mount Lemmon Survey	·	2.3 km	MPC · JPL
482756	2013 GK_{18}	—	November 3, 2010	Mount Lemmon	Mount Lemmon Survey	·	3.0 km	MPC · JPL
482757	2013 GQ_{24}	—	March 12, 2013	Kitt Peak	Spacewatch	·	2.2 km	MPC · JPL
482758	2013 GB_{28}	—	January 14, 2012	Mount Lemmon	Mount Lemmon Survey	EOS	2.0 km	MPC · JPL
482759	2013 GA_{38}	—	October 31, 2010	Mount Lemmon	Mount Lemmon Survey	·	2.9 km	MPC · JPL
482760	2013 GO_{38}	—	December 5, 2007	Catalina	CSS	·	1.7 km	MPC · JPL
482761	2013 GZ_{48}	—	March 30, 2008	Kitt Peak	Spacewatch	·	2.4 km	MPC · JPL
482762	2013 GM_{52}	—	October 26, 2005	Kitt Peak	Spacewatch	·	2.8 km	MPC · JPL
482763	2013 GK_{55}	—	March 10, 2008	Catalina	CSS	·	1.7 km	MPC · JPL
482764	2013 GF_{56}	—	September 12, 2010	Kitt Peak	Spacewatch	·	2.8 km	MPC · JPL
482765	2013 GZ_{68}	—	June 1, 2008	Kitt Peak	Spacewatch	H	700 m	MPC · JPL
482766	2013 GF_{69}	—	April 10, 2013	Haleakala	Pan-STARRS 1	APO · PHA	440 m	MPC · JPL
482767	2013 GZ_{70}	—	March 16, 2013	Catalina	CSS	·	3.0 km	MPC · JPL
482768	2013 GN_{73}	—	October 11, 2010	Mount Lemmon	Mount Lemmon Survey	·	2.1 km	MPC · JPL
482769	2013 GJ_{75}	—	October 3, 2006	Mount Lemmon	Mount Lemmon Survey	·	1.9 km	MPC · JPL
482770	2013 GS_{75}	—	May 31, 2008	Mount Lemmon	Mount Lemmon Survey	·	2.8 km	MPC · JPL
482771	2013 GO_{93}	—	October 27, 2005	Kitt Peak	Spacewatch	·	2.6 km	MPC · JPL
482772	2013 GK_{95}	—	December 13, 2006	Kitt Peak	Spacewatch	·	2.0 km	MPC · JPL
482773	2013 GM_{95}	—	March 31, 2008	Mount Lemmon	Mount Lemmon Survey	·	4.4 km	MPC · JPL
482774	2013 GP_{107}	—	February 9, 2007	Kitt Peak	Spacewatch	·	3.2 km	MPC · JPL
482775	2013 GP_{126}	—	October 13, 1999	Socorro	LINEAR	·	3.1 km	MPC · JPL
482776	2013 GT_{131}	—	May 10, 2005	Kitt Peak	Spacewatch	·	2.1 km	MPC · JPL
482777	2013 HQ_{12}	—	April 19, 2004	Socorro	LINEAR	·	1.5 km	MPC · JPL
482778	2013 HO_{26}	—	September 21, 2009	Kitt Peak	Spacewatch	·	3.4 km	MPC · JPL
482779	2013 HT_{55}	—	October 4, 2006	Mount Lemmon	Mount Lemmon Survey	·	1.9 km	MPC · JPL
482780	2013 HV_{69}	—	April 11, 2008	Mount Lemmon	Mount Lemmon Survey	·	1.5 km	MPC · JPL
482781	2013 HO_{85}	—	November 3, 2005	Mount Lemmon	Mount Lemmon Survey	·	1.8 km	MPC · JPL
482782	2013 HH_{119}	—	November 25, 2005	Kitt Peak	Spacewatch	·	1.9 km	MPC · JPL
482783	2013 JZ_{34}	—	September 18, 2010	Mount Lemmon	Mount Lemmon Survey	·	3.7 km	MPC · JPL
482784	2013 JD_{63}	—	October 30, 2010	Mount Lemmon	Mount Lemmon Survey	·	2.5 km	MPC · JPL
482785	2013 KD_{1}	—	October 29, 2010	Mount Lemmon	Mount Lemmon Survey	·	3.1 km	MPC · JPL
482786	2013 KX_{7}	—	October 20, 2006	Mount Lemmon	Mount Lemmon Survey	DOR	2.3 km	MPC · JPL
482787	2013 KB_{17}	—	January 16, 2010	WISE	WISE	·	3.6 km	MPC · JPL
482788	2013 LU_{3}	—	June 1, 2013	Kitt Peak	Spacewatch	·	3.1 km	MPC · JPL
482789	2013 LY_{10}	—	May 10, 2007	Catalina	CSS	·	4.3 km	MPC · JPL
482790	2013 LS_{11}	—	June 4, 2013	Kitt Peak	Spacewatch	·	1.9 km	MPC · JPL
482791	2013 LX_{15}	—	April 23, 2013	Mount Lemmon	Mount Lemmon Survey	H	560 m	MPC · JPL
482792	2013 LO_{17}	—	December 4, 1999	Catalina	CSS	·	4.3 km	MPC · JPL
482793	2013 LP_{22}	—	November 22, 2005	Kitt Peak	Spacewatch	·	2.7 km	MPC · JPL
482794	2013 MG_{5}	—	December 28, 2003	Socorro	LINEAR	H	530 m	MPC · JPL
482795	2013 PO_{29}	—	December 4, 2008	Mount Lemmon	Mount Lemmon Survey	H	500 m	MPC · JPL
482796	2013 QJ_{10}	—	August 24, 2013	La Sagra	OAM	ATE · PHA	430 m	MPC · JPL
482797	2013 QX_{46}	—	December 3, 2008	Catalina	CSS	H	560 m	MPC · JPL
482798	2013 QK_{48}	—	August 29, 2013	Haleakala	Pan-STARRS 1	APO · PHA	760 m	MPC · JPL
482799	2013 RQ_{4}	—	January 30, 2012	Mount Lemmon	Mount Lemmon Survey	H	610 m	MPC · JPL
482800	2013 RU_{16}	—	September 5, 2008	Kitt Peak	Spacewatch	H	400 m	MPC · JPL

== 482801–482900 ==
back to top

Designation			Discovery			Properties		Ref
Permanent	Provisional	Named after	Date	Site	Discoverer(s)	Category	Diam.	Ref
482801	2013 RO_{73}	—	December 27, 2011	Mount Lemmon	Mount Lemmon Survey	H	520 m	MPC · JPL
482802	2013 TL_{114}	—	October 11, 2010	Kitt Peak	Spacewatch	·	640 m	MPC · JPL
482803	2013 TY_{135}	—	September 17, 2013	Mount Lemmon	Mount Lemmon Survey	H	530 m	MPC · JPL
482804	2013 UM	—	June 11, 2004	Socorro	LINEAR	H	710 m	MPC · JPL
482805	2013 VB_{2}	—	November 1, 2005	Catalina	CSS	H	590 m	MPC · JPL
482806	2013 WH_{4}	—	October 16, 2013	Mount Lemmon	Mount Lemmon Survey	·	2.5 km	MPC · JPL
482807	2013 WY_{15}	—	November 2, 2013	Mount Lemmon	Mount Lemmon Survey	·	710 m	MPC · JPL
482808	2013 WE_{17}	—	January 16, 2011	Mount Lemmon	Mount Lemmon Survey	·	620 m	MPC · JPL
482809	2013 WU_{25}	—	September 28, 2013	Catalina	CSS	·	3.3 km	MPC · JPL
482810	2013 WK_{26}	—	October 5, 2013	Kitt Peak	Spacewatch	·	3.3 km	MPC · JPL
482811	2013 WR_{57}	—	June 10, 2010	WISE	WISE	·	3.0 km	MPC · JPL
482812	2013 WJ_{60}	—	October 25, 2013	Kitt Peak	Spacewatch	PHO	890 m	MPC · JPL
482813	2013 WH_{67}	—	November 26, 2005	Mount Lemmon	Mount Lemmon Survey	H	650 m	MPC · JPL
482814	2013 WM_{71}	—	November 2, 2013	Mount Lemmon	Mount Lemmon Survey	·	660 m	MPC · JPL
482815	2013 WE_{83}	—	September 16, 2009	Mount Lemmon	Mount Lemmon Survey	·	820 m	MPC · JPL
482816	2013 WS_{90}	—	May 27, 2012	Mount Lemmon	Mount Lemmon Survey	·	780 m	MPC · JPL
482817	2013 WX_{96}	—	October 31, 2013	Kitt Peak	Spacewatch	EOS	1.8 km	MPC · JPL
482818	2013 WT_{99}	—	November 29, 2005	Kitt Peak	Spacewatch	H	550 m	MPC · JPL
482819	2013 WB_{108}	—	October 6, 2013	Catalina	CSS	·	3.7 km	MPC · JPL
482820	2013 XL_{10}	—	May 13, 2004	Socorro	LINEAR	H	630 m	MPC · JPL
482821	2013 XL_{12}	—	December 7, 2013	Catalina	CSS	H	680 m	MPC · JPL
482822	2013 XH_{21}	—	January 28, 2006	Kitt Peak	Spacewatch	H	560 m	MPC · JPL
482823	2013 XX_{21}	—	November 3, 2010	Catalina	CSS	H	660 m	MPC · JPL
482824	2013 XC_{26}	—	December 6, 2013	Haleakala	Pan-STARRS 1	cubewano (hot)	601 km	MPC · JPL
482825	2013 YK_{5}	—	March 6, 2011	Kitt Peak	Spacewatch	·	690 m	MPC · JPL
482826	2013 YC_{17}	—	October 19, 2006	Catalina	CSS	·	730 m	MPC · JPL
482827	2013 YU_{37}	—	September 29, 2003	Kitt Peak	Spacewatch	·	520 m	MPC · JPL
482828	2013 YB_{65}	—	February 17, 2007	Catalina	CSS	PHO	1.2 km	MPC · JPL
482829	2013 YL_{68}	—	October 16, 2009	Catalina	CSS	·	770 m	MPC · JPL
482830	2013 YF_{73}	—	September 20, 2003	Campo Imperatore	CINEOS	·	610 m	MPC · JPL
482831	2013 YC_{84}	—	July 23, 1998	Caussols	ODAS	(2076)	860 m	MPC · JPL
482832	2013 YU_{95}	—	September 28, 2009	Mount Lemmon	Mount Lemmon Survey	V	670 m	MPC · JPL
482833	2013 YZ_{99}	—	October 29, 2003	Kitt Peak	Spacewatch	·	560 m	MPC · JPL
482834	2013 YE_{116}	—	December 14, 2006	Mount Lemmon	Mount Lemmon Survey	·	560 m	MPC · JPL
482835	2014 AH_{7}	—	September 25, 1998	Xinglong	SCAP	·	1.0 km	MPC · JPL
482836	2014 AR_{16}	—	August 23, 2004	Kitt Peak	Spacewatch	H	620 m	MPC · JPL
482837	2014 AD_{47}	—	October 2, 2006	Mount Lemmon	Mount Lemmon Survey	·	620 m	MPC · JPL
482838	2014 BR_{4}	—	November 19, 2006	Catalina	CSS	·	920 m	MPC · JPL
482839	2014 BQ_{7}	—	August 24, 2012	Kitt Peak	Spacewatch	·	750 m	MPC · JPL
482840	2014 BO_{20}	—	February 7, 2007	Mount Lemmon	Mount Lemmon Survey	V	590 m	MPC · JPL
482841	2014 BO_{22}	—	January 27, 2007	Mount Lemmon	Mount Lemmon Survey	·	660 m	MPC · JPL
482842	2014 BR_{22}	—	December 25, 2005	Mount Lemmon	Mount Lemmon Survey	·	1.3 km	MPC · JPL
482843	2014 BU_{34}	—	October 29, 2003	Kitt Peak	Spacewatch	·	810 m	MPC · JPL
482844	2014 BT_{55}	—	September 14, 2009	Kitt Peak	Spacewatch	·	620 m	MPC · JPL
482845	2014 BD_{59}	—	January 12, 2014	Mount Lemmon	Mount Lemmon Survey	·	780 m	MPC · JPL
482846	2014 CC_{5}	—	January 6, 2010	Kitt Peak	Spacewatch	·	1.4 km	MPC · JPL
482847	2014 CS_{7}	—	May 28, 2008	Kitt Peak	Spacewatch	·	810 m	MPC · JPL
482848	2014 DS_{15}	—	December 27, 2006	Mount Lemmon	Mount Lemmon Survey	·	910 m	MPC · JPL
482849	2014 DO_{23}	—	September 17, 2006	Kitt Peak	Spacewatch	·	530 m	MPC · JPL
482850	2014 DR_{33}	—	February 27, 2007	Kitt Peak	Spacewatch	·	950 m	MPC · JPL
482851	2014 DT_{34}	—	November 17, 2006	Kitt Peak	Spacewatch	·	620 m	MPC · JPL
482852	2014 DP_{41}	—	September 18, 2012	Mount Lemmon	Mount Lemmon Survey	V	640 m	MPC · JPL
482853	2014 DR_{42}	—	March 11, 2007	Kitt Peak	Spacewatch	·	810 m	MPC · JPL
482854	2014 DN_{51}	—	January 8, 2010	Kitt Peak	Spacewatch	·	1.2 km	MPC · JPL
482855	2014 DY_{51}	—	January 20, 2006	Kitt Peak	Spacewatch	·	1.3 km	MPC · JPL
482856	2014 DJ_{64}	—	September 23, 2012	Mount Lemmon	Mount Lemmon Survey	·	1.1 km	MPC · JPL
482857	2014 DW_{72}	—	October 16, 2012	Mount Lemmon	Mount Lemmon Survey	·	1.1 km	MPC · JPL
482858	2014 DH_{88}	—	February 8, 2007	Kitt Peak	Spacewatch	·	530 m	MPC · JPL
482859	2014 DB_{91}	—	April 2, 2011	Mount Lemmon	Mount Lemmon Survey	·	720 m	MPC · JPL
482860	2014 DO_{97}	—	January 12, 1996	Kitt Peak	Spacewatch	ERI	1.4 km	MPC · JPL
482861	2014 DF_{107}	—	November 7, 2007	Mount Lemmon	Mount Lemmon Survey	·	1.6 km	MPC · JPL
482862	2014 DO_{110}	—	November 27, 2009	Kitt Peak	Spacewatch	·	750 m	MPC · JPL
482863	2014 DN_{115}	—	February 23, 2007	Kitt Peak	Spacewatch	(2076)	650 m	MPC · JPL
482864	2014 DA_{119}	—	February 21, 2007	Mount Lemmon	Mount Lemmon Survey	·	520 m	MPC · JPL
482865	2014 DC_{129}	—	September 13, 2007	Mount Lemmon	Mount Lemmon Survey	·	1.3 km	MPC · JPL
482866	2014 DL_{129}	—	November 19, 2009	Kitt Peak	Spacewatch	·	650 m	MPC · JPL
482867	2014 DT_{129}	—	July 13, 2004	Siding Spring	SSS	PHO	1.0 km	MPC · JPL
482868	2014 DM_{134}	—	September 13, 2007	Mount Lemmon	Mount Lemmon Survey	·	1.6 km	MPC · JPL
482869	2014 DT_{135}	—	October 12, 2007	Kitt Peak	Spacewatch	PAD	1.5 km	MPC · JPL
482870	2014 EB_{2}	—	January 24, 2007	Kitt Peak	Spacewatch	·	560 m	MPC · JPL
482871	2014 ER_{5}	—	February 9, 2014	Kitt Peak	Spacewatch	MAS	660 m	MPC · JPL
482872	2014 EM_{6}	—	January 17, 2007	Kitt Peak	Spacewatch	·	590 m	MPC · JPL
482873	2014 EZ_{16}	—	November 20, 2009	Mount Lemmon	Mount Lemmon Survey	·	620 m	MPC · JPL
482874	2014 EM_{19}	—	November 14, 1998	Kitt Peak	Spacewatch	·	870 m	MPC · JPL
482875	2014 ER_{21}	—	September 15, 2009	Kitt Peak	Spacewatch	·	620 m	MPC · JPL
482876	2014 EV_{21}	—	November 15, 1998	Kitt Peak	Spacewatch	·	970 m	MPC · JPL
482877	2014 EA_{22}	—	December 11, 2012	Mount Lemmon	Mount Lemmon Survey	(5)	1.4 km	MPC · JPL
482878	2014 EW_{22}	—	April 6, 1995	Kitt Peak	Spacewatch	·	1.2 km	MPC · JPL
482879	2014 ED_{30}	—	September 23, 2005	Kitt Peak	Spacewatch	·	940 m	MPC · JPL
482880	2014 EX_{31}	—	April 26, 2010	Mount Lemmon	Mount Lemmon Survey	·	1.4 km	MPC · JPL
482881	2014 ER_{32}	—	March 26, 2007	Mount Lemmon	Mount Lemmon Survey	·	710 m	MPC · JPL
482882	2014 EE_{42}	—	September 18, 2007	Kitt Peak	Spacewatch	·	1.3 km	MPC · JPL
482883	2014 EK_{48}	—	November 25, 2006	Mount Lemmon	Mount Lemmon Survey	·	880 m	MPC · JPL
482884	2014 EQ_{51}	—	December 27, 2006	Mount Lemmon	Mount Lemmon Survey	·	670 m	MPC · JPL
482885	2014 FC_{14}	—	April 1, 2005	Catalina	CSS	·	2.2 km	MPC · JPL
482886	2014 FL_{16}	—	March 4, 2010	Kitt Peak	Spacewatch	·	1.2 km	MPC · JPL
482887	2014 FU_{17}	—	February 16, 2010	Mount Lemmon	Mount Lemmon Survey	·	1.8 km	MPC · JPL
482888	2014 FH_{38}	—	October 22, 2003	Kitt Peak	Spacewatch	·	510 m	MPC · JPL
482889	2014 FT_{51}	—	January 9, 2006	Kitt Peak	Spacewatch	MAR	1.5 km	MPC · JPL
482890	2014 FR_{53}	—	May 20, 2006	Kitt Peak	Spacewatch	·	1.3 km	MPC · JPL
482891	2014 FC_{65}	—	May 13, 2007	Kitt Peak	Spacewatch	·	1.0 km	MPC · JPL
482892	2014 FR_{66}	—	December 18, 2009	Mount Lemmon	Mount Lemmon Survey	·	900 m	MPC · JPL
482893	2014 FX_{66}	—	October 10, 2007	Mount Lemmon	Mount Lemmon Survey	·	1.7 km	MPC · JPL
482894	2014 GD_{5}	—	October 3, 2003	Kitt Peak	Spacewatch	·	1.5 km	MPC · JPL
482895	2014 GS_{6}	—	December 8, 2012	Mount Lemmon	Mount Lemmon Survey	·	1.1 km	MPC · JPL
482896	2014 GX_{15}	—	May 27, 2003	Kitt Peak	Spacewatch	NYS	1 km	MPC · JPL
482897	2014 GZ_{25}	—	October 13, 2005	Kitt Peak	Spacewatch	·	670 m	MPC · JPL
482898	2014 GW_{41}	—	March 8, 2014	Mount Lemmon	Mount Lemmon Survey	EUN	1.3 km	MPC · JPL
482899	2014 GT_{42}	—	December 12, 2012	Mount Lemmon	Mount Lemmon Survey	·	1.1 km	MPC · JPL
482900	2014 HG_{3}	—	May 12, 2010	Mount Lemmon	Mount Lemmon Survey	·	1.7 km	MPC · JPL

== 482901–483000 ==
back to top

Designation			Discovery			Properties		Ref
Permanent	Provisional	Named after	Date	Site	Discoverer(s)	Category	Diam.	Ref
482901	2014 HA_{12}	—	November 30, 2008	Mount Lemmon	Mount Lemmon Survey	·	1.2 km	MPC · JPL
482902	2014 HG_{14}	—	November 8, 2007	Kitt Peak	Spacewatch	AGN	1.0 km	MPC · JPL
482903	2014 HP_{18}	—	November 26, 2012	Mount Lemmon	Mount Lemmon Survey	·	990 m	MPC · JPL
482904	2014 HO_{22}	—	January 15, 2009	Kitt Peak	Spacewatch	EUN	1.3 km	MPC · JPL
482905	2014 HX_{25}	—	October 30, 2011	Kitt Peak	Spacewatch	·	1.7 km	MPC · JPL
482906	2014 HA_{26}	—	April 27, 2009	Mount Lemmon	Mount Lemmon Survey	·	2.0 km	MPC · JPL
482907	2014 HB_{30}	—	May 8, 2005	Kitt Peak	Spacewatch	·	1.7 km	MPC · JPL
482908	2014 HT_{31}	—	September 28, 2003	Anderson Mesa	LONEOS	EUN	1.3 km	MPC · JPL
482909	2014 HD_{38}	—	September 13, 2004	Socorro	LINEAR	·	3.6 km	MPC · JPL
482910	2014 HV_{42}	—	October 19, 2011	Mount Lemmon	Mount Lemmon Survey	·	1.7 km	MPC · JPL
482911	2014 HR_{47}	—	October 21, 2008	Mount Lemmon	Mount Lemmon Survey	PHO	820 m	MPC · JPL
482912	2014 HW_{51}	—	October 19, 2007	Mount Lemmon	Mount Lemmon Survey	·	1.1 km	MPC · JPL
482913	2014 HT_{70}	—	November 7, 2007	Kitt Peak	Spacewatch	·	1.4 km	MPC · JPL
482914	2014 HV_{73}	—	October 2, 2008	Mount Lemmon	Mount Lemmon Survey	·	930 m	MPC · JPL
482915	2014 HB_{93}	—	March 2, 2009	Mount Lemmon	Mount Lemmon Survey	·	1.7 km	MPC · JPL
482916	2014 HO_{112}	—	February 5, 2013	Mount Lemmon	Mount Lemmon Survey	·	1.8 km	MPC · JPL
482917	2014 HL_{135}	—	October 19, 2011	Mount Lemmon	Mount Lemmon Survey	·	1.4 km	MPC · JPL
482918	2014 HO_{145}	—	September 23, 2008	Mount Lemmon	Mount Lemmon Survey	·	1.2 km	MPC · JPL
482919	2014 HK_{155}	—	May 1, 2006	Kitt Peak	Spacewatch	·	1.1 km	MPC · JPL
482920	2014 HM_{159}	—	December 26, 2011	Mount Lemmon	Mount Lemmon Survey	·	3.1 km	MPC · JPL
482921	2014 HR_{159}	—	August 3, 2010	WISE	WISE	·	3.4 km	MPC · JPL
482922	2014 HF_{161}	—	January 10, 2013	Kitt Peak	Spacewatch	·	1.9 km	MPC · JPL
482923	2014 HL_{164}	—	August 7, 2010	WISE	WISE	·	4.5 km	MPC · JPL
482924	2014 HJ_{183}	—	February 22, 2009	Kitt Peak	Spacewatch	·	1.4 km	MPC · JPL
482925	2014 HF_{185}	—	October 29, 2005	Kitt Peak	Spacewatch	·	3.0 km	MPC · JPL
482926	2014 HA_{187}	—	June 10, 2010	WISE	WISE	·	1.6 km	MPC · JPL
482927	2014 HE_{195}	—	October 15, 2007	Mount Lemmon	Mount Lemmon Survey	MAR	1.2 km	MPC · JPL
482928	2014 JW	—	May 17, 2010	WISE	WISE	·	2.2 km	MPC · JPL
482929	2014 JZ_{4}	—	January 16, 1997	Campo Imperatore	CINEOS	·	1.4 km	MPC · JPL
482930	2014 JY_{10}	—	December 7, 1999	Catalina	CSS	·	1.9 km	MPC · JPL
482931	2014 JB_{17}	—	May 10, 2003	Kitt Peak	Spacewatch	·	4.6 km	MPC · JPL
482932	2014 JG_{24}	—	May 25, 2003	Kitt Peak	Spacewatch	·	3.1 km	MPC · JPL
482933	2014 JC_{27}	—	June 18, 2010	WISE	WISE	·	2.8 km	MPC · JPL
482934	2014 JH_{29}	—	December 2, 2008	Kitt Peak	Spacewatch	·	3.4 km	MPC · JPL
482935	2014 JX_{36}	—	January 19, 2013	Mount Lemmon	Mount Lemmon Survey	·	1.7 km	MPC · JPL
482936	2014 JR_{38}	—	June 23, 2010	WISE	WISE	·	4.2 km	MPC · JPL
482937	2014 JO_{48}	—	November 23, 2006	Kitt Peak	Spacewatch	EOS	1.6 km	MPC · JPL
482938	2014 JO_{52}	—	November 3, 2011	Kitt Peak	Spacewatch	·	2.3 km	MPC · JPL
482939	2014 JM_{59}	—	May 4, 2005	Kitt Peak	Spacewatch	·	3.2 km	MPC · JPL
482940	2014 JH_{61}	—	October 8, 2007	Mount Lemmon	Mount Lemmon Survey	EUN	930 m	MPC · JPL
482941	2014 JP_{61}	—	February 13, 2008	Mount Lemmon	Mount Lemmon Survey	·	1.7 km	MPC · JPL
482942	2014 JS_{61}	—	February 6, 2007	Mount Lemmon	Mount Lemmon Survey	·	3.5 km	MPC · JPL
482943	2014 JJ_{62}	—	November 15, 2007	Mount Lemmon	Mount Lemmon Survey	·	1.8 km	MPC · JPL
482944	2014 JL_{67}	—	April 26, 2010	WISE	WISE	·	2.8 km	MPC · JPL
482945	2014 JJ_{69}	—	November 19, 1995	Kitt Peak	Spacewatch	·	750 m	MPC · JPL
482946	2014 JM_{69}	—	April 18, 2007	Mount Lemmon	Mount Lemmon Survey	·	630 m	MPC · JPL
482947	2014 JU_{77}	—	October 6, 1999	Kitt Peak	Spacewatch	·	1.1 km	MPC · JPL
482948	2014 KG_{1}	—	November 19, 2008	Mount Lemmon	Mount Lemmon Survey	PHO	920 m	MPC · JPL
482949	2014 KV_{2}	—	July 11, 2010	WISE	WISE	·	4.8 km	MPC · JPL
482950	2014 KV_{15}	—	April 24, 2003	Kitt Peak	Spacewatch	·	930 m	MPC · JPL
482951	2014 KZ_{18}	—	March 20, 2007	Kitt Peak	Spacewatch	·	660 m	MPC · JPL
482952	2014 KP_{26}	—	September 29, 2010	Mount Lemmon	Mount Lemmon Survey	·	2.0 km	MPC · JPL
482953	2014 KR_{26}	—	October 14, 2010	Mount Lemmon	Mount Lemmon Survey	·	2.3 km	MPC · JPL
482954	2014 KJ_{36}	—	December 19, 2007	Mount Lemmon	Mount Lemmon Survey	·	2.2 km	MPC · JPL
482955	2014 KB_{42}	—	July 13, 2010	WISE	WISE	·	2.9 km	MPC · JPL
482956	2014 KJ_{43}	—	February 1, 2009	Mount Lemmon	Mount Lemmon Survey	·	1.8 km	MPC · JPL
482957	2014 KR_{43}	—	March 5, 2013	Mount Lemmon	Mount Lemmon Survey	EOS	1.7 km	MPC · JPL
482958	2014 KJ_{52}	—	June 22, 2009	Mount Lemmon	Mount Lemmon Survey	·	2.6 km	MPC · JPL
482959	2014 KG_{56}	—	January 4, 2013	Kitt Peak	Spacewatch	·	1.3 km	MPC · JPL
482960	2014 KK_{58}	—	May 1, 2014	Mount Lemmon	Mount Lemmon Survey	·	2.5 km	MPC · JPL
482961	2014 KO_{59}	—	December 19, 2007	Mount Lemmon	Mount Lemmon Survey	·	2.1 km	MPC · JPL
482962	2014 KS_{65}	—	December 13, 2004	Kitt Peak	Spacewatch	·	1.1 km	MPC · JPL
482963	2014 KA_{67}	—	October 8, 2007	Mount Lemmon	Mount Lemmon Survey	·	1.5 km	MPC · JPL
482964	2014 KD_{67}	—	May 4, 2014	Mount Lemmon	Mount Lemmon Survey	EOS	1.8 km	MPC · JPL
482965	2014 KK_{67}	—	May 4, 2014	Mount Lemmon	Mount Lemmon Survey	CYB	3.3 km	MPC · JPL
482966	2014 KY_{68}	—	October 27, 2005	Catalina	CSS	·	2.4 km	MPC · JPL
482967	2014 KE_{69}	—	October 2, 2010	Kitt Peak	Spacewatch	·	2.5 km	MPC · JPL
482968	2014 KK_{69}	—	July 20, 2010	WISE	WISE	·	2.6 km	MPC · JPL
482969	2014 KY_{79}	—	December 5, 2007	Kitt Peak	Spacewatch	PAD	1.7 km	MPC · JPL
482970	2014 KM_{82}	—	September 16, 2009	Mount Lemmon	Mount Lemmon Survey	·	4.3 km	MPC · JPL
482971	2014 KA_{94}	—	March 2, 2010	WISE	WISE	·	2.2 km	MPC · JPL
482972	2014 KY_{95}	—	October 28, 2005	Kitt Peak	Spacewatch	·	2.9 km	MPC · JPL
482973	2014 KT_{98}	—	April 11, 2003	Kitt Peak	Spacewatch	·	2.5 km	MPC · JPL
482974	2014 LL	—	March 11, 2005	Kitt Peak	Spacewatch	·	1.5 km	MPC · JPL
482975	2014 LX_{3}	—	July 27, 2010	WISE	WISE	·	2.9 km	MPC · JPL
482976	2014 LF_{8}	—	January 28, 2006	Kitt Peak	Spacewatch	·	1.1 km	MPC · JPL
482977	2014 LF_{28}	—	September 29, 2011	Mount Lemmon	Mount Lemmon Survey	·	1.6 km	MPC · JPL
482978	2014 MS_{8}	—	May 16, 2010	Mount Lemmon	Mount Lemmon Survey	·	1.2 km	MPC · JPL
482979	2014 MO_{23}	—	November 30, 2008	Mount Lemmon	Mount Lemmon Survey	·	1.7 km	MPC · JPL
482980	2014 MK_{28}	—	June 10, 2010	Catalina	CSS	·	1.2 km	MPC · JPL
482981	2014 ME_{48}	—	April 1, 2009	Mount Lemmon	Mount Lemmon Survey	·	2.1 km	MPC · JPL
482982	2014 NP_{55}	—	January 2, 2009	Kitt Peak	Spacewatch	3:2	6.2 km	MPC · JPL
482983	2014 NP_{62}	—	October 14, 2010	Mount Lemmon	Mount Lemmon Survey	·	2.2 km	MPC · JPL
482984	2014 OJ_{7}	—	December 29, 2005	Kitt Peak	Spacewatch	·	3.3 km	MPC · JPL
482985	2014 OY_{13}	—	May 11, 2010	Mount Lemmon	Mount Lemmon Survey	NYS	940 m	MPC · JPL
482986	2014 OD_{52}	—	August 7, 2008	Kitt Peak	Spacewatch	CYB	3.6 km	MPC · JPL
482987	2014 OM_{88}	—	January 5, 2012	Kitt Peak	Spacewatch	·	1.8 km	MPC · JPL
482988	2014 OH_{90}	—	April 1, 2013	Siding Spring	SSS	·	1.8 km	MPC · JPL
482989	2014 OV_{159}	—	January 19, 2012	Haleakala	Pan-STARRS 1	·	3.7 km	MPC · JPL
482990	2014 OK_{165}	—	April 17, 2009	Mount Lemmon	Mount Lemmon Survey	·	1.6 km	MPC · JPL
482991	2014 OA_{333}	—	April 3, 2013	Mount Lemmon	Mount Lemmon Survey	·	1.9 km	MPC · JPL
482992	2014 OP_{346}	—	February 23, 2007	Mount Lemmon	Mount Lemmon Survey	·	2.1 km	MPC · JPL
482993	2014 OO_{372}	—	January 2, 2012	Mount Lemmon	Mount Lemmon Survey	·	2.3 km	MPC · JPL
482994	2014 PK_{7}	—	January 4, 2006	Kitt Peak	Spacewatch	·	3.2 km	MPC · JPL
482995	2014 QD_{38}	—	August 22, 1998	Xinglong	SCAP	·	3.0 km	MPC · JPL
482996	2014 QJ_{72}	—	December 25, 2005	Kitt Peak	Spacewatch	EOS	1.9 km	MPC · JPL
482997	2014 QR_{102}	—	January 27, 2012	Mount Lemmon	Mount Lemmon Survey	·	2.3 km	MPC · JPL
482998	2014 QS_{271}	—	August 29, 2005	Kitt Peak	Spacewatch	·	2.4 km	MPC · JPL
482999	2014 QZ_{285}	—	April 25, 2007	Mount Lemmon	Mount Lemmon Survey	·	3.9 km	MPC · JPL
483000	2014 QP_{300}	—	February 2, 2006	Mount Lemmon	Mount Lemmon Survey	·	2.9 km	MPC · JPL

== Meaning of names ==
As minor planet discoveries are confirmed, they are given a permanent number by the IAU's Minor Planet Center (MPC), and the discoverers can then submit names for them, following the IAU's naming conventions. The list below concerns those minor planets in the specified number-range that have received names, and explains the meanings of those names.

Official naming citations of newly named small Solar System bodies are approved and published in a bulletin by IAU's Working Group for Small Bodies Nomenclature (WGSBN). Before May 2021, citations were published in MPC's Minor Planet Circulars for many decades. Recent citations can also be found on the JPL Small-Body Database (SBDB). Until his death in 2016, German astronomer Lutz D. Schmadel compiled these citations into the Dictionary of Minor Planet Names (DMP) and regularly updated the collection.

Based on Paul Herget's The Names of the Minor Planets, Schmadel also researched the unclear origin of numerous asteroids, most of which had been named prior to World War II. This article incorporates text from this source, which is in the public domain: SBDB New namings may only be added to this list below after official publication as the preannouncement of names is condemned. The WGSBN publishes a comprehensive guideline for the naming rules of non-cometary small Solar System bodies.

Named minor planet	Provisional	This minor planet was named for...	Ref · Catalog
482101 Arizonacu	2010 MB_{43}	Named to honor Arizona's unique geological abundance of copper.	IAU · 482101
