= List of Jupiter trojans (Trojan camp) (400001–500000) =

This is a partial list of Jupiter's L_{5} trojans (60° behind Jupiter) with numbers 400001–500000. If available, an object's mean diameter is taken from the NEOWISE data release, which the Small-Body Database has also adopted. Mean diameters are rounded to two significant figures if smaller than 100 kilometers. Estimates are in italics and calculated from a magnitude-to-diameter conversion, using an assumed albedo of 0.057.

== 400001–500000 ==
This list contains 295 objects sorted in numerical order.

Designation	Discovery			Orbital description					Diam.	Remarks	Refs
Designation	Date	Observer	Site	a (AU)	e	i (°)	q (AU)	Q (AU)	Diam.	Remarks	Refs
(403144) 2008 ED_{162}	11 March 2008	MLS	Mount Lemmon	5.134	0.082	7.1	4.715	5.554	8.2 km	–	catalog · MPC · JPL
(406732) 2008 GS_{101}	10 April 2008	Spacewatch	Kitt Peak	5.237	0.055	30.3	4.951	5.523	12 km	–	catalog · MPC · JPL
(408609) 2013 RA_{73}	26 March 2007	MLS	Mount Lemmon	5.243	0.066	13.5	4.898	5.588	9.6 km	–	catalog · MPC · JPL
(409718) 2006 BV_{225}	30 January 2006	Spacewatch	Kitt Peak	5.211	0.153	10.1	4.415	6.007	7.9 km	–	catalog · MPC · JPL
(409720) 2006 BK_{255}	31 January 2006	Spacewatch	Kitt Peak	5.256	0.056	20.1	4.964	5.549	12 km	–	catalog · MPC · JPL
(412386) 2013 QK_{56}	28 February 2008	Spacewatch	Kitt Peak	5.160	0.036	9.5	4.976	5.345	10 km	–	catalog · MPC · JPL
(412394) 2013 TZ_{46}	29 April 2008	MLS	Mount Lemmon	5.150	0.063	27.3	4.826	5.474	8.6 km	–	catalog · MPC · JPL
(412395) 2013 TX_{127}	8 March 2008	Spacewatch	Kitt Peak	5.148	0.049	11.5	4.894	5.401	10 km	–	catalog · MPC · JPL
(413195) 2002 WJ_{27}	24 November 2002	NEAT	Palomar	5.199	0.128	16.6	4.533	5.865	7.8 km	–	catalog · MPC · JPL
(413712) 2005 YM_{237}	28 December 2005	Spacewatch	Kitt Peak	5.122	0.007	2.8	5.084	5.160	7.8 km	–	catalog · MPC · JPL
(414249) 2008 GC_{32}	3 April 2008	Spacewatch	Kitt Peak	5.231	0.031	17.9	5.067	5.396	9.6 km	–	catalog · MPC · JPL
(414256) 2008 GJ_{77}	7 April 2008	Spacewatch	Kitt Peak	5.189	0.038	10.8	4.992	5.387	9.2 km	–	catalog · MPC · JPL
(414275) 2008 JO_{21}	5 May 2008	Spacewatch	Kitt Peak	5.300	0.056	23.4	5.004	5.595	9.0 km	–	catalog · MPC · JPL
(414468) 2009 KM_{14}	5 January 2006	MLS	Mount Lemmon	5.220	0.054	18.3	4.940	5.501	12 km	–	catalog · MPC · JPL
(414502) 2009 SE_{1}	2 April 2009	MLS	Mount Lemmon	5.147	0.055	28.0	4.864	5.430	11 km	–	catalog · MPC · JPL
(415023) 2011 NC_{2}	27 January 2006	Spacewatch	Kitt Peak	5.147	0.087	7.9	4.701	5.593	8.6 km	–	catalog · MPC · JPL
(415026) 2011 QT_{85}	28 March 2008	MLS	Mount Lemmon	5.165	0.052	7.1	4.895	5.435	9.4 km	–	catalog · MPC · JPL
(415265) 2012 RB_{5}	11 March 2008	Spacewatch	Kitt Peak	5.208	0.013	21.8	5.141	5.275	9.5 km	–	catalog · MPC · JPL
(415444) 2013 SV_{85}	1 February 2006	Spacewatch	Kitt Peak	5.168	0.054	6.1	4.886	5.449	11 km	–	catalog · MPC · JPL
(415449) 2013 TG_{39}	10 March 2007	Spacewatch	Kitt Peak	5.230	0.054	11.1	4.949	5.511	9.3 km	–	catalog · MPC · JPL
(415454) 2013 TL_{105}	19 September 2001	Spacewatch	Kitt Peak	5.231	0.088	5.7	4.771	5.690	9.0 km	–	catalog · MPC · JPL
(416225) 2002 XZ_{118}	10 December 2002	NEAT	Palomar	5.182	0.056	15.6	4.891	5.474	10 km	–	catalog · MPC · JPL
(416502) 2003 YT_{7}	20 December 2003	R. Clingan	Nashville	5.190	0.030	33.2	5.032	5.349	13 km	–	catalog · MPC · JPL
(416513) 2003 YU_{93}	21 December 2003	Needville	Needville	5.201	0.073	14.8	4.819	5.583	10 km	–	catalog · MPC · JPL
(416693) 2004 YU_{20}	18 December 2004	MLS	Mount Lemmon	5.128	0.014	19.3	5.055	5.200	12 km	–	catalog · MPC · JPL
(416705) 2005 AR_{64}	13 January 2005	Spacewatch	Kitt Peak	5.240	0.066	12.7	4.896	5.584	8.8 km	–	catalog · MPC · JPL
(416708) 2005 AL_{74}	15 January 2005	Spacewatch	Kitt Peak	5.305	0.038	25.8	5.102	5.507	13 km	–	catalog · MPC · JPL
(416713) 2005 BR_{33}	20 December 2004	MLS	Mount Lemmon	5.249	0.046	20.0	5.008	5.490	10 km	–	catalog · MPC · JPL
(416772) 2005 EQ_{272}	17 January 2005	Spacewatch	Kitt Peak	5.246	0.080	4.7	4.828	5.665	8.4 km	–	catalog · MPC · JPL
(416776) 2005 EM_{298}	17 November 2001	Spacewatch	Kitt Peak	5.381	0.041	1.5	5.161	5.601	8.0 km	–	catalog · MPC · JPL
(417274) 2006 AL_{44}	7 January 2006	Spacewatch	Kitt Peak	5.141	0.042	10.9	4.924	5.358	8.7 km	–	catalog · MPC · JPL
(417305) 2006 BA_{103}	23 January 2006	MLS	Mount Lemmon	5.172	0.090	35.0	4.706	5.638	10 km	–	catalog · MPC · JPL
(417324) 2006 CE_{14}	23 January 2006	MLS	Mount Lemmon	5.167	0.025	21.4	5.035	5.298	8.9 km	–	catalog · MPC · JPL
(417327) 2006 CZ_{29}	2 February 2006	Spacewatch	Kitt Peak	5.184	0.044	17.8	4.955	5.413	9.7 km	–	catalog · MPC · JPL
(417354) 2006 EB_{57}	2 February 2006	Spacewatch	Kitt Peak	5.281	0.015	4.0	5.203	5.358	9.2 km	–	catalog · MPC · JPL
(417756) 2007 DO_{47}	21 February 2007	MLS	Mount Lemmon	5.126	0.040	28.2	4.921	5.330	10 km	–	catalog · MPC · JPL
(417767) 2007 DX_{96}	23 February 2007	Spacewatch	Kitt Peak	5.157	0.048	16.4	4.912	5.402	7.6 km	–	catalog · MPC · JPL
(417829) 2007 FS_{48}	28 January 2006	Spacewatch	Kitt Peak	5.187	0.061	10.5	4.869	5.504	7.7 km	–	catalog · MPC · JPL
(417830) 2007 FE_{49}	20 March 2007	MLS	Mount Lemmon	5.237	0.084	18.1	4.799	5.675	8.2 km	–	catalog · MPC · JPL
(417844) 2007 HP_{8}	18 April 2007	MLS	Mount Lemmon	5.163	0.074	7.5	4.782	5.545	7.4 km	–	catalog · MPC · JPL
(418230) 2008 CJ_{208}	10 February 2008	MLS	Mount Lemmon	5.158	0.054	17.6	4.878	5.437	7.9 km	–	catalog · MPC · JPL
(418258) 2008 EF_{7}	4 March 2008	Spacewatch	Kitt Peak	5.234	0.037	31.5	5.039	5.429	10 km	–	catalog · MPC · JPL
(418328) 2008 FZ_{134}	30 March 2008	Spacewatch	Kitt Peak	5.184	0.092	7.7	4.705	5.664	7.9 km	–	catalog · MPC · JPL
(418334) 2008 GQ_{7}	1 April 2008	Spacewatch	Kitt Peak	5.281	0.053	5.4	5.000	5.561	8.2 km	–	catalog · MPC · JPL
(418341) 2008 GR_{35}	30 March 2008	Spacewatch	Kitt Peak	5.211	0.075	13.0	4.822	5.600	9.2 km	–	catalog · MPC · JPL
(418343) 2008 GG_{46}	21 September 2001	Sloan Digital Sky Survey	Apache Point	5.211	0.044	25.7	4.984	5.439	9.1 km	–	catalog · MPC · JPL
(418372) 2008 GB_{138}	28 February 2008	Spacewatch	Kitt Peak	5.161	0.145	13.8	4.412	5.911	8.6 km	–	catalog · MPC · JPL
(418373) 2008 GX_{138}	6 April 2008	Spacewatch	Kitt Peak	5.268	0.086	6.3	4.815	5.722	7.5 km	–	catalog · MPC · JPL
(418374) 2008 GM_{141}	14 April 2008	MLS	Mount Lemmon	5.315	0.033	19.4	5.138	5.493	8.6 km	–	catalog · MPC · JPL
(418393) 2008 HG_{67}	28 April 2008	Spacewatch	Kitt Peak	5.196	0.038	42.5	4.997	5.396	9.9 km	–	catalog · MPC · JPL
(418394) 2008 HO_{69}	29 April 2008	MLS	Mount Lemmon	5.222	0.069	10.0	4.864	5.579	9.3 km	–	catalog · MPC · JPL
(418399) 2008 JT_{22}	7 May 2008	Spacewatch	Kitt Peak	5.183	0.045	13.6	4.950	5.416	10 km	–	catalog · MPC · JPL
(418400) 2008 JL_{27}	8 May 2008	Spacewatch	Kitt Peak	5.242	0.043	22.6	5.014	5.470	11 km	–	catalog · MPC · JPL
(418979) 2009 HJ_{106}	18 April 2009	MLS	Mount Lemmon	5.195	0.125	15.2	4.546	5.844	9.5 km	–	catalog · MPC · JPL
(418986) 2009 KJ_{9}	24 May 2009	Spacewatch	Kitt Peak	5.202	0.144	22.6	4.453	5.952	12 km	–	catalog · MPC · JPL
(418987) 2009 KX_{11}	25 March 2009	MLS	Mount Lemmon	5.184	0.077	20.9	4.783	5.586	11 km	–	catalog · MPC · JPL
(418988) 2009 KT_{14}	17 April 2009	MLS	Mount Lemmon	5.152	0.091	18.3	4.681	5.623	8.6 km	–	catalog · MPC · JPL
(418997) 2009 OP_{10}	27 July 2009	Spacewatch	Kitt Peak	5.201	0.152	34.6	4.413	5.990	13 km	–	catalog · MPC · JPL
(419061) 2009 SX_{19}	21 September 2009	MLS	Mount Lemmon	5.189	0.077	29.7	4.792	5.586	9.6 km	–	catalog · MPC · JPL
(419515) 2010 HS_{10}	17 April 2010	WISE	WISE	5.239	0.042	10.9	5.020	5.459	13 km	–	catalog · MPC · JPL
(419517) 2010 HU_{22}	25 April 2010	WISE	WISE	5.245	0.060	20.5	4.931	5.560	13 km	–	catalog · MPC · JPL
(419524) 2010 JV_{80}	10 May 2010	WISE	WISE	5.202	0.144	21.1	4.453	5.952	8.1 km	–	catalog · MPC · JPL
(420253) 2011 JV_{9}	30 March 2010	WISE	WISE	5.141	0.055	26.9	4.860	5.423	15 km	–	catalog · MPC · JPL
(420265) 2011 KG_{17}	18 December 2003	Spacewatch	Kitt Peak	5.262	0.079	29.1	4.844	5.679	15 km	–	catalog · MPC · JPL
(420266) 2011 KZ_{19}	11 April 2010	WISE	WISE	5.207	0.139	20.9	4.482	5.932	11 km	–	catalog · MPC · JPL
(420276) 2011 LY_{19}	8 June 2011	MLS	Mount Lemmon	5.226	0.059	7.1	4.917	5.535	7.2 km	–	catalog · MPC · JPL
(420281) 2011 OH_{52}	29 March 2010	WISE	WISE	5.246	0.123	13.6	4.599	5.893	11 km	–	catalog · MPC · JPL
(420283) 2011 QR_{4}	16 January 2005	Spacewatch	Kitt Peak	5.140	0.053	10.5	4.865	5.415	9.5 km	–	catalog · MPC · JPL
(420285) 2011 QR_{47}	24 August 2011	Siding Spring Survey	Siding Spring	5.204	0.093	4.8	4.719	5.690	9.2 km	–	catalog · MPC · JPL
(420289) 2011 SK_{262}	7 September 2000	Spacewatch	Kitt Peak	5.294	0.066	5.9	4.947	5.641	9.0 km	–	catalog · MPC · JPL
(420313) 2011 YQ_{62}	18 April 2010	WISE	WISE	5.210	0.079	22.4	4.799	5.620	13 km	–	catalog · MPC · JPL
(420715) 2012 ML_{7}	9 June 2011	MLS	Mount Lemmon	5.254	0.070	17.1	4.888	5.619	12 km	–	catalog · MPC · JPL
(420716) 2012 OL_{1}	5 March 1994	Spacewatch	Kitt Peak	5.164	0.070	28.0	4.802	5.526	13 km	–	catalog · MPC · JPL
(420726) 2012 QH_{21}	27 June 2011	Spacewatch	Kitt Peak	5.199	0.076	9.8	4.803	5.595	7.7 km	–	catalog · MPC · JPL
(420727) 2012 QE_{31}	14 April 2008	MLS	Mount Lemmon	5.187	0.080	10.7	4.774	5.600	8.2 km	–	catalog · MPC · JPL
(420728) 2012 RO_{2}	26 July 2011	Pan-STARRS 1	Haleakala	5.144	0.095	21.3	4.656	5.632	11 km	–	catalog · MPC · JPL
(420731) 2012 SP_{6}	15 March 2007	Spacewatch	Kitt Peak	5.172	0.036	11.2	4.987	5.356	10 km	–	catalog · MPC · JPL
(420735) 2012 TG	5 December 2002	Spacewatch	Kitt Peak	5.288	0.032	3.9	5.119	5.457	8.3 km	–	catalog · MPC · JPL
(420736) 2012 TM	25 February 2007	MLS	Mount Lemmon	5.139	0.078	4.8	4.739	5.539	8.4 km	–	catalog · MPC · JPL
(420737) 2012 TO	20 March 2007	MLS	Mount Lemmon	5.197	0.060	3.6	4.885	5.510	8.3 km	–	catalog · MPC · JPL
(420739) 2012 TK_{52}	21 February 2006	MLS	Mount Lemmon	5.165	0.076	3.3	4.772	5.558	8.5 km	–	catalog · MPC · JPL
(420740) 2012 TY_{122}	31 May 2011	MLS	Mount Lemmon	5.147	0.058	14.0	4.850	5.444	8.1 km	–	catalog · MPC · JPL
(420741) 2012 TA_{124}	5 May 2008	MLS	Mount Lemmon	5.200	0.060	4.4	4.889	5.511	8.0 km	–	catalog · MPC · JPL
(420742) 2012 TY_{142}	4 September 2000	Spacewatch	Kitt Peak	5.121	0.084	4.4	4.690	5.552	7.3 km	–	catalog · MPC · JPL
(420743) 2012 TS_{146}	28 May 2008	MLS	Mount Lemmon	5.291	0.046	10.3	5.046	5.537	8.4 km	–	catalog · MPC · JPL
(420744) 2012 TA_{289}	14 April 2008	Spacewatch	Kitt Peak	5.236	0.085	28.7	4.793	5.678	8.0 km	–	catalog · MPC · JPL
(420748) 2012 UM_{140}	27 April 2010	WISE	WISE	5.178	0.075	28.2	4.789	5.566	8.6 km	–	catalog · MPC · JPL
(420749) 2012 XU_{93}	18 September 2012	MLS	Mount Lemmon	5.196	0.046	7.7	4.957	5.435	12 km	–	catalog · MPC · JPL
(421032) 2013 PM_{65}	3 April 2008	MLS	Mount Lemmon	5.176	0.165	12.1	4.324	6.029	9.6 km	–	catalog · MPC · JPL
(421134) 2013 RL_{3}	11 September 2001	Spacewatch	Kitt Peak	5.221	0.042	13.2	5.002	5.440	8.2 km	–	catalog · MPC · JPL
(421146) 2013 RL_{27}	11 September 2001	Spacewatch	Kitt Peak	5.180	0.039	23.0	4.980	5.380	9.0 km	–	catalog · MPC · JPL
(421168) 2013 RY_{44}	15 December 2006	MLS	Mount Lemmon	5.192	0.021	20.3	5.085	5.299	12 km	–	catalog · MPC · JPL
(421282) 2013 SR_{85}	31 March 2008	MLS	Mount Lemmon	5.150	0.031	21.7	4.989	5.312	13 km	–	catalog · MPC · JPL
(421312) 2013 TJ_{49}	13 September 2013	MLS	Mount Lemmon	5.151	0.119	3.2	4.538	5.764	7.5 km	–	catalog · MPC · JPL
(421316) 2013 TP_{52}	5 September 2000	Sloan Digital Sky Survey	Apache Point	5.165	0.019	18.8	5.067	5.262	10 km	–	catalog · MPC · JPL
(421338) 2013 TX_{87}	17 September 2001	Spacewatch	Kitt Peak	5.201	0.018	13.0	5.107	5.296	8.2 km	–	catalog · MPC · JPL
(421365) 2013 TE_{129}	25 February 2006	Spacewatch	Kitt Peak	5.208	0.110	8.2	4.635	5.781	8.5 km	–	catalog · MPC · JPL
(421382) 2013 UE_{4}	6 April 2008	MLS	Mount Lemmon	5.182	0.051	24.5	4.920	5.443	13 km	–	catalog · MPC · JPL
(421393) 2013 VD	19 January 2005	Spacewatch	Kitt Peak	5.240	0.031	6.9	5.080	5.400	10 km	–	catalog · MPC · JPL
(421400) 2013 VD_{14}	12 March 2007	MLS	Mount Lemmon	5.141	0.072	23.4	4.769	5.512	12 km	–	catalog · MPC · JPL
(422575) 2014 TC_{54}	5 March 2006	Spacewatch	Kitt Peak	5.267	0.101	10.2	4.735	5.799	8.5 km	–	catalog · MPC · JPL
(422786) 2001 VH_{132}	12 November 2001	Sloan Digital Sky Survey	Apache Point	5.165	0.158	13.3	4.350	5.980	9.8 km	–	catalog · MPC · JPL
(423099) 2004 AZ_{18}	15 January 2004	Spacewatch	Kitt Peak	5.281	0.048	32.7	5.027	5.535	13 km	–	catalog · MPC · JPL
(423745) 2006 BC_{275}	26 January 2006	MLS	Mount Lemmon	5.169	0.079	26.5	4.760	5.578	9.2 km	–	catalog · MPC · JPL
(424102) 2007 EB_{27}	11 March 2007	W. Ries	Altschwendt	5.137	0.143	20.3	4.400	5.874	8.4 km	–	catalog · MPC · JPL
(424606) 2008 HZ_{45}	15 April 2008	Spacewatch	Kitt Peak	5.224	0.076	14.7	4.828	5.620	8.7 km	–	catalog · MPC · JPL
(424618) 2008 JZ_{24}	11 May 2008	Farra d'Isonzo	Farra d'Isonzo	5.237	0.151	35.3	4.447	6.027	14 km	–	catalog · MPC · JPL
(424619) 2008 JT_{25}	8 May 2008	Spacewatch	Kitt Peak	5.174	0.108	19.0	4.617	5.730	8.7 km	–	catalog · MPC · JPL
(424621) 2008 JY_{32}	8 May 2008	Spacewatch	Kitt Peak	5.212	0.083	14.9	4.779	5.645	7.6 km	–	catalog · MPC · JPL
(424632) 2008 KE_{18}	28 May 2008	Spacewatch	Kitt Peak	5.171	0.024	29.3	5.044	5.297	12 km	–	catalog · MPC · JPL
(425039) 2009 KX_{37}	7 February 2006	MLS	Mount Lemmon	5.140	0.077	18.2	4.746	5.534	8.5 km	–	catalog · MPC · JPL
(426289) 2012 TE_{52}	24 September 2012	Spacewatch	Kitt Peak	5.145	0.068	5.4	4.793	5.497	7.1 km	–	catalog · MPC · JPL
(426292) 2012 TA_{74}	14 April 2008	MLS	Mount Lemmon	5.314	0.037	24.2	5.115	5.513	9.6 km	–	catalog · MPC · JPL
(426311) 2012 TT_{201}	16 September 2012	Spacewatch	Kitt Peak	5.274	0.078	12.9	4.862	5.686	8.2 km	–	catalog · MPC · JPL
(426326) 2012 US_{137}	14 March 2007	Spacewatch	Kitt Peak	5.247	0.062	28.8	4.923	5.571	8.2 km	–	catalog · MPC · JPL
(426723) 2013 TM_{51}	29 September 2013	PMO NEO Survey Program	XuYi	5.234	0.170	3.8	4.344	6.124	8.6 km	–	catalog · MPC · JPL
(427230) 2014 WK_{50}	29 April 2008	MLS	Mount Lemmon	5.143	0.066	12.4	4.805	5.482	11 km	–	catalog · MPC · JPL
(427346) 2014 WW_{364}	17 March 2007	CSS	Catalina	5.192	0.068	33.1	4.837	5.548	15 km	–	catalog · MPC · JPL
(427369) 2014 WB_{472}	1 June 1997	Spacewatch	Kitt Peak	5.156	0.052	26.1	4.888	5.425	11 km	–	catalog · MPC · JPL
(427374) 2014 XO	18 January 2005	Spacewatch	Kitt Peak	5.117	0.131	14.5	4.445	5.788	9.8 km	–	catalog · MPC · JPL
(429862) 2012 SO_{6}	13 January 2005	LINEAR	Socorro	5.195	0.025	23.9	5.068	5.323	15 km	–	catalog · MPC · JPL
(438682) 2008 HB_{22}	26 April 2008	Spacewatch	Kitt Peak	5.310	0.085	21.0	4.859	5.760	11 km	–	catalog · MPC · JPL
(448059) 2008 FS_{131}	27 March 2008	MLS	Mount Lemmon	5.195	0.038	16.6	5.000	5.390	8.3 km	–	catalog · MPC · JPL
(450501) 2005 YG_{204}	25 December 2005	MLS	Mount Lemmon	5.169	0.064	29.1	4.838	5.499	12 km	–	catalog · MPC · JPL
(452967) 2007 DM_{28}	17 February 2007	Spacewatch	Kitt Peak	5.222	0.158	4.8	4.395	6.049	7.6 km	–	catalog · MPC · JPL
(453201) 2008 FU_{135}	29 March 2008	Spacewatch	Kitt Peak	5.284	0.057	22.8	4.981	5.586	9.6 km	–	catalog · MPC · JPL
(453223) 2008 HG_{69}	27 April 2008	Spacewatch	Kitt Peak	5.240	0.024	25.9	5.114	5.365	11 km	–	catalog · MPC · JPL
(453230) 2008 KJ_{13}	27 May 2008	Spacewatch	Kitt Peak	5.192	0.144	11.1	4.443	5.940	8.4 km	–	catalog · MPC · JPL
(453779) 2011 JW_{9}	7 May 2011	MLS	Mount Lemmon	5.134	0.028	17.6	4.989	5.279	10 km	–	catalog · MPC · JPL
(453789) 2011 PH_{11}	1 April 2010	WISE	WISE	5.185	0.134	22.5	4.489	5.881	11 km	–	catalog · MPC · JPL
(454073) 2012 TL_{52}	12 March 2007	Spacewatch	Kitt Peak	5.263	0.109	3.3	4.690	5.836	8.3 km	–	catalog · MPC · JPL
(454255) 2013 QQ_{44}	28 December 2005	Spacewatch	Kitt Peak	5.171	0.049	2.5	4.918	5.424	7.9 km	–	catalog · MPC · JPL
(454257) 2013 RH_{98}	11 January 2008	Spacewatch	Kitt Peak	5.087	0.071	16.5	4.724	5.449	11 km	–	catalog · MPC · JPL
(454735) 2014 UM_{13}	23 June 2011	Spacewatch	Kitt Peak	5.239	0.010	6.6	5.190	5.289	9.3 km	–	catalog · MPC · JPL
(454744) 2014 UL_{133}	4 April 2008	Spacewatch	Kitt Peak	5.253	0.045	6.2	5.019	5.487	8.7 km	–	catalog · MPC · JPL
(454752) 2014 VU_{9}	11 April 2008	MLS	Mount Lemmon	5.302	0.070	25.4	4.928	5.675	12 km	–	catalog · MPC · JPL
(454753) 2014 VQ_{12}	30 March 2008	Spacewatch	Kitt Peak	5.223	0.031	7.3	5.060	5.386	9.1 km	–	catalog · MPC · JPL
(454756) 2014 WV_{6}	26 January 2006	MLS	Mount Lemmon	5.163	0.106	1.6	4.616	5.711	8.1 km	–	catalog · MPC · JPL
(454781) 2014 XK_{11}	10 April 2010	WISE	WISE	5.157	0.113	12.0	4.572	5.742	12 km	–	catalog · MPC · JPL
(455524) 2003 YR_{109}	22 December 2003	Spacewatch	Kitt Peak	5.281	0.088	21.3	4.818	5.745	9.8 km	–	catalog · MPC · JPL
(456079) 2006 BU_{59}	12 November 2005	Spacewatch	Kitt Peak	5.155	0.035	17.9	4.974	5.335	8.3 km	–	catalog · MPC · JPL
(456094) 2006 BH_{164}	26 January 2006	MLS	Mount Lemmon	5.139	0.065	22.6	4.807	5.472	11 km	–	catalog · MPC · JPL
(456110) 2006 BF_{284}	31 January 2006	Spacewatch	Kitt Peak	5.172	0.040	3.3	4.963	5.380	7.5 km	–	catalog · MPC · JPL
(456117) 2006 CY_{56}	4 February 2006	MLS	Mount Lemmon	5.142	0.088	24.7	4.690	5.594	13 km	–	catalog · MPC · JPL
(456120) 2006 DC_{25}	20 February 2006	Spacewatch	Kitt Peak	5.227	0.050	1.7	4.965	5.488	6.6 km	–	catalog · MPC · JPL
(457150) 2008 FD_{133}	30 March 2008	Spacewatch	Kitt Peak	5.161	0.025	30.4	5.030	5.292	11 km	–	catalog · MPC · JPL
(457221) 2008 KZ_{8}	1 April 2008	Spacewatch	Kitt Peak	5.215	0.177	12.0	4.293	6.137	8.0 km	–	catalog · MPC · JPL
(457762) 2009 JX_{8}	13 May 2009	Spacewatch	Kitt Peak	5.116	0.152	12.8	4.338	5.893	8.0 km	–	catalog · MPC · JPL
(457770) 2009 KA_{6}	25 May 2009	MLS	Mount Lemmon	5.161	0.143	18.7	4.424	5.897	8.9 km	–	catalog · MPC · JPL
(458140) 2010 HX_{49}	24 April 2010	WISE	WISE	5.217	0.044	28.1	4.988	5.446	13 km	–	catalog · MPC · JPL
(458730) 2011 LA_{20}	9 June 2011	MLS	Mount Lemmon	5.272	0.055	10.3	4.980	5.564	9.5 km	–	catalog · MPC · JPL
(458735) 2011 OA_{39}	2 July 2011	Spacewatch	Kitt Peak	5.163	0.061	9.5	4.848	5.478	7.8 km	–	catalog · MPC · JPL
(458747) 2011 QP_{47}	22 June 2010	MLS	Mount Lemmon	5.305	0.080	11.2	4.878	5.732	9.7 km	–	catalog · MPC · JPL
(458749) 2011 QP_{74}	1 February 2006	MLS	Mount Lemmon	5.153	0.070	18.3	4.792	5.514	9.5 km	–	catalog · MPC · JPL
(459422) 2012 RA_{9}	1 April 2010	WISE	WISE	5.122	0.052	29.2	4.855	5.389	12 km	–	catalog · MPC · JPL
(459427) 2012 SG_{25}	11 April 2010	WISE	WISE	5.196	0.107	13.0	4.641	5.752	9.0 km	–	catalog · MPC · JPL
(459428) 2012 SC_{50}	13 April 2010	WISE	WISE	5.240	0.109	7.7	4.670	5.809	9.7 km	–	catalog · MPC · JPL
(459432) 2012 TL_{14}	26 August 2012	Spacewatch	Kitt Peak	5.208	0.091	8.6	4.735	5.680	7.7 km	–	catalog · MPC · JPL
(459436) 2012 TV_{81}	24 August 2012	Spacewatch	Kitt Peak	5.169	0.110	2.1	4.602	5.736	7.2 km	–	catalog · MPC · JPL
(459438) 2012 TZ_{103}	19 September 2011	MLS	Mount Lemmon	5.320	0.077	9.2	4.913	5.728	7.4 km	–	catalog · MPC · JPL
(459439) 2012 TB_{146}	9 March 2007	MLS	Mount Lemmon	5.173	0.110	13.5	4.605	5.740	9.3 km	–	catalog · MPC · JPL
(459849) 2013 TN_{47}	20 September 2001	Spacewatch	Kitt Peak	5.149	0.126	5.8	4.500	5.799	7.2 km	–	catalog · MPC · JPL
(460786) 2014 WS_{26}	4 October 2013	MLS	Mount Lemmon	5.148	0.085	12.7	4.712	5.584	8.3 km	–	catalog · MPC · JPL
(460790) 2014 WH_{32}	24 June 2011	MLS	Mount Lemmon	5.128	0.014	12.7	5.057	5.199	9.5 km	–	catalog · MPC · JPL
(461833) 2006 BH_{276}	31 January 2006	Spacewatch	Kitt Peak	5.129	0.069	26.0	4.776	5.481	9.7 km	–	catalog · MPC · JPL
(461843) 2006 DN_{174}	2 February 2006	MLS	Mount Lemmon	5.230	0.077	15.3	4.825	5.635	9.7 km	–	catalog · MPC · JPL
(462085) 2007 GB_{9}	11 March 2007	MLS	Mount Lemmon	5.273	0.051	31.1	5.002	5.544	12 km	–	catalog · MPC · JPL
(466209) 2012 QF_{36}	25 August 2012	Spacewatch	Kitt Peak	5.206	0.108	16.0	4.641	5.770	9.2 km	–	catalog · MPC · JPL
(473619) 2015 XO_{279}	13 August 2013	Spacewatch	Kitt Peak	5.191	0.056	4.8	4.901	5.481	7.3 km	–	catalog · MPC · JPL
(473684) 2015 XU_{379}	4 April 2008	Spacewatch	Kitt Peak	5.253	0.044	9.5	5.024	5.483	8.7 km	–	catalog · MPC · JPL
(473718) 2015 YU_{20}	26 April 2010	WISE	WISE	5.171	0.045	27.9	4.936	5.406	11 km	–	catalog · MPC · JPL
(476534) 2008 GQ_{141}	1 April 2008	Spacewatch	Kitt Peak	5.243	0.025	2.7	5.112	5.375	7.3 km	–	catalog · MPC · JPL
(478575) 2012 TQ_{79}	7 May 2010	WISE	WISE	5.216	0.134	18.1	4.516	5.916	8.9 km	–	catalog · MPC · JPL
(481031) 2004 YL_{23}	18 December 2004	MLS	Mount Lemmon	5.241	0.015	17.0	5.161	5.321	8.9 km	–	catalog · MPC · JPL
(481340) 2006 BK_{240}	31 January 2006	Spacewatch	Kitt Peak	5.154	0.031	29.8	4.993	5.315	10 km	–	catalog · MPC · JPL
(481504) 2007 EL_{62}	24 November 2006	MLS	Mount Lemmon	5.109	0.039	17.6	4.909	5.310	13 km	–	catalog · MPC · JPL
(481536) 2007 MH_{24}	21 June 2007	MLS	Mount Lemmon	5.132	0.051	38.0	4.871	5.392	9.2 km	–	catalog · MPC · JPL
(481744) 2008 GT_{126}	14 April 2008	MLS	Mount Lemmon	5.178	0.121	11.0	4.552	5.804	8.0 km	–	catalog · MPC · JPL
(481747) 2008 GD_{140}	6 April 2008	Spacewatch	Kitt Peak	5.207	0.101	9.7	4.683	5.731	8.7 km	–	catalog · MPC · JPL
(481987) 2009 MY_{1}	26 May 2009	MLS	Mount Lemmon	5.097	0.013	28.7	5.033	5.162	11 km	–	catalog · MPC · JPL
(482087) 2010 HP_{21}	22 April 2010	WISE	WISE	5.199	0.049	29.4	4.946	5.451	13 km	–	catalog · MPC · JPL
(482088) 2010 HW_{22}	25 April 2010	WISE	WISE	5.174	0.027	27.4	5.034	5.315	13 km	–	catalog · MPC · JPL
(482249) 2011 KT_{21}	19 April 2010	WISE	WISE	5.300	0.069	26.7	4.933	5.666	10 km	–	catalog · MPC · JPL
(482266) 2011 QK_{99}	13 March 2008	Spacewatch	Kitt Peak	5.227	0.147	16.6	4.458	5.996	7.4 km	–	catalog · MPC · JPL
(482465) 2012 KH_{47}	30 May 2012	MLS	Mount Lemmon	5.198	0.096	7.3	4.699	5.697	8.9 km	–	catalog · MPC · JPL
(482514) 2012 TH_{154}	3 April 2008	MLS	Mount Lemmon	5.214	0.096	23.9	4.716	5.713	7.4 km	–	catalog · MPC · JPL
(483008) 2014 SM_{349}	29 May 2009	MLS	Mount Lemmon	5.268	0.034	29.1	5.091	5.444	9.4 km	–	catalog · MPC · JPL
(483014) 2014 UJ_{170}	10 March 2007	MLS	Mount Lemmon	5.165	0.056	5.0	4.874	5.456	11 km	–	catalog · MPC · JPL
(483018) 2014 VV_{37}	12 October 2013	MLS	Mount Lemmon	5.151	0.056	13.0	4.864	5.437	7.2 km	–	catalog · MPC · JPL
(483020) 2014 WL_{120}	10 March 2008	MLS	Mount Lemmon	5.129	0.113	18.5	4.548	5.710	12 km	–	catalog · MPC · JPL
(483021) 2014 WD_{202}	7 April 2008	Spacewatch	Kitt Peak	5.178	0.129	16.8	4.512	5.844	8.2 km	–	catalog · MPC · JPL
(483024) 2014 WB_{367}	19 April 2010	WISE	WISE	5.199	0.150	14.3	4.418	5.980	11 km	–	catalog · MPC · JPL
(483025) 2014 WY_{378}	18 December 2004	MLS	Mount Lemmon	5.229	0.086	7.8	4.781	5.676	11 km	–	catalog · MPC · JPL
(483026) 2014 WS_{454}	15 January 2005	Spacewatch	Kitt Peak	5.218	0.040	24.9	5.007	5.429	7.9 km	–	catalog · MPC · JPL
(483027) 2015 AY_{47}	26 January 2006	MLS	Mount Lemmon	5.146	0.015	18.0	5.070	5.223	11 km	–	catalog · MPC · JPL
(483400) 1997 LY_{13}	8 June 1997	E. W. Elst	La Silla	5.187	0.058	30.7	4.888	5.485	13 km	–	catalog · MPC · JPL
(483649) 2004 YL_{16}	18 December 2004	MLS	Mount Lemmon	5.088	0.076	13.0	4.701	5.474	10 km	–	catalog · MPC · JPL
(483652) 2005 CZ_{37}	8 February 2005	C. Vuissoz; R. Behrend	La Silla	5.192	0.091	30.1	4.719	5.665	11 km	–	catalog · MPC · JPL
(483664) 2005 ES_{272}	2 February 2005	Spacewatch	Kitt Peak	5.244	0.059	25.7	4.935	5.553	11 km	–	catalog · MPC · JPL
(483968) 2006 BJ_{226}	8 January 2006	MLS	Mount Lemmon	5.203	0.065	24.1	4.865	5.541	12 km	–	catalog · MPC · JPL
(484039) 2006 EC_{26}	26 January 2006	Spacewatch	Kitt Peak	5.188	0.030	11.6	5.031	5.345	8.5 km	–	catalog · MPC · JPL
(484043) 2006 EV_{46}	4 March 2006	Spacewatch	Kitt Peak	5.183	0.015	30.9	5.104	5.261	10 km	–	catalog · MPC · JPL
(484218) 2007 DQ_{70}	21 February 2007	Spacewatch	Kitt Peak	5.127	0.041	15.7	4.914	5.339	8.0 km	–	catalog · MPC · JPL
(484225) 2007 DM_{115}	17 February 2007	MLS	Mount Lemmon	5.198	0.082	30.7	4.771	5.624	12 km	–	catalog · MPC · JPL
(484231) 2007 EE_{68}	25 February 2007	MLS	Mount Lemmon	5.136	0.109	13.5	4.574	5.698	8.5 km	–	catalog · MPC · JPL
(484249) 2007 FY_{40}	20 March 2007	MLS	Mount Lemmon	5.181	0.121	14.3	4.556	5.807	7.0 km	–	catalog · MPC · JPL
(484254) 2007 FN_{48}	16 March 2007	MLS	Mount Lemmon	5.131	0.029	9.0	4.984	5.277	7.5 km	–	catalog · MPC · JPL
(484265) 2007 HW_{58}	25 March 2007	MLS	Mount Lemmon	5.260	0.071	12.9	4.887	5.634	7.8 km	–	catalog · MPC · JPL
(484540) 2008 FV_{120}	11 March 2008	MLS	Mount Lemmon	5.165	0.035	27.7	4.987	5.344	12 km	–	catalog · MPC · JPL
(484545) 2008 GM_{37}	3 April 2008	Spacewatch	Kitt Peak	5.171	0.094	9.1	4.685	5.658	6.6 km	–	catalog · MPC · JPL
(484549) 2008 GW_{73}	7 April 2008	Spacewatch	Kitt Peak	5.062	0.078	10.1	4.669	5.455	7.8 km	–	catalog · MPC · JPL
(484553) 2008 GJ_{140}	6 April 2008	MLS	Mount Lemmon	5.201	0.046	15.4	4.964	5.438	8.2 km	–	catalog · MPC · JPL
(484557) 2008 HR_{31}	29 March 2008	Spacewatch	Kitt Peak	5.135	0.048	17.0	4.891	5.379	7.8 km	–	catalog · MPC · JPL
(484559) 2008 HN_{42}	6 February 2008	Spacewatch	Kitt Peak	5.201	0.074	13.0	4.818	5.583	7.9 km	–	catalog · MPC · JPL
(484566) 2008 KK_{38}	30 May 2008	Spacewatch	Kitt Peak	5.168	0.150	13.0	4.395	5.941	7.2 km	–	catalog · MPC · JPL
(484568) 2008 LT_{3}	11 April 2008	MLS	Mount Lemmon	5.205	0.075	16.7	4.813	5.597	10 km	–	catalog · MPC · JPL
(485098) 2010 GF_{42}	7 April 2010	WISE	WISE	5.224	0.067	31.8	4.876	5.572	12 km	–	catalog · MPC · JPL
(485220) 2010 VS	12 May 2010	WISE	WISE	5.269	0.065	39.0	4.928	5.611	12 km	–	catalog · MPC · JPL
(485396) 2011 LV_{2}	3 June 2011	MLS	Mount Lemmon	5.265	0.136	15.2	4.546	5.983	8.4 km	–	catalog · MPC · JPL
(485412) 2011 OP_{56}	27 July 2011	Pan-STARRS 1	Haleakala	5.261	0.056	24.5	4.965	5.557	11 km	–	catalog · MPC · JPL
(485413) 2011 OC_{60}	22 July 2011	Pan-STARRS 1	Haleakala	5.223	0.103	22.2	4.683	5.763	9.2 km	–	catalog · MPC · JPL
(485414) 2011 OD_{60}	18 December 2004	MLS	Mount Lemmon	5.173	0.013	1.8	5.107	5.240	7.3 km	–	catalog · MPC · JPL
(485415) 2011 OF_{60}	23 September 2014	Pan-STARRS 1	Haleakala	5.192	0.123	15.3	4.553	5.831	7.8 km	–	catalog · MPC · JPL
(485416) 2011 OJ_{60}	26 January 2006	MLS	Mount Lemmon	5.122	0.063	4.2	4.799	5.445	7.4 km	–	catalog · MPC · JPL
(485417) 2011 OK_{60}	27 July 2011	Pan-STARRS 1	Haleakala	5.277	0.045	24.1	5.039	5.516	9.8 km	–	catalog · MPC · JPL
(485418) 2011 OL_{60}	28 July 2011	Pan-STARRS 1	Haleakala	5.254	0.036	10.7	5.066	5.441	6.8 km	–	catalog · MPC · JPL
(485421) 2011 QG	18 August 2011	Pan-STARRS 1	Haleakala	5.188	0.149	19.7	4.415	5.962	11 km	–	catalog · MPC · JPL
(485422) 2011 QH_{3}	2 August 2011	Pan-STARRS 1	Haleakala	5.199	0.040	14.6	4.988	5.409	11 km	–	catalog · MPC · JPL
(485423) 2011 QO_{5}	2 August 2011	Pan-STARRS 1	Haleakala	5.126	0.118	15.4	4.523	5.728	9.9 km	–	catalog · MPC · JPL
(485431) 2011 QZ_{49}	18 August 2011	Pan-STARRS 1	Haleakala	5.151	0.136	21.8	4.449	5.853	14 km	–	catalog · MPC · JPL
(485439) 2011 QQ_{64}	25 February 2006	MLS	Mount Lemmon	5.304	0.085	28.7	4.854	5.754	9.0 km	–	catalog · MPC · JPL
(485449) 2011 QD_{90}	9 February 2005	MLS	Mount Lemmon	5.242	0.031	22.8	5.078	5.406	8.4 km	–	catalog · MPC · JPL
(485451) 2011 QH_{99}	20 November 2014	Pan-STARRS 1	Haleakala	5.171	0.088	13.7	4.718	5.624	7.3 km	–	catalog · MPC · JPL
(485452) 2011 QJ_{99}	2 February 2006	Spacewatch	Kitt Peak	5.235	0.023	25.8	5.115	5.355	7.5 km	–	catalog · MPC · JPL
(485456) 2011 RO_{3}	5 September 2011	Pan-STARRS 1	Haleakala	5.198	0.020	18.2	5.095	5.300	7.8 km	–	catalog · MPC · JPL
(485479) 2011 SQ_{71}	24 September 2011	Pan-STARRS 1	Haleakala	5.205	0.095	15.0	4.708	5.701	8.9 km	–	catalog · MPC · JPL
(485507) 2011 SY_{265}	30 August 2011	Pan-STARRS 1	Haleakala	5.143	0.067	14.1	4.801	5.485	8.7 km	–	catalog · MPC · JPL
(486008) 2012 PK_{44}	14 September 2013	Pan-STARRS 1	Haleakala	5.144	0.114	18.0	4.556	5.732	7.2 km	–	catalog · MPC · JPL
(486014) 2012 RP_{17}	24 February 2006	MLS	Mount Lemmon	5.207	0.030	10.6	5.053	5.362	8.0 km	–	catalog · MPC · JPL
(486017) 2012 SK_{6}	2 August 2011	Pan-STARRS 1	Haleakala	5.145	0.043	20.8	4.923	5.366	12 km	–	catalog · MPC · JPL
(486018) 2012 SQ_{23}	24 August 2011	Pan-STARRS 1	Haleakala	5.207	0.089	24.3	4.741	5.672	8.3 km	–	catalog · MPC · JPL
(486019) 2012 SA_{25}	3 July 2011	Pan-STARRS 1	Haleakala	5.219	0.069	16.4	4.859	5.578	7.0 km	–	catalog · MPC · JPL
(486021) 2012 SQ_{49}	23 September 2012	MLS	Mount Lemmon	5.153	0.015	30.3	5.075	5.231	9.3 km	–	catalog · MPC · JPL
(486022) 2012 SR_{52}	8 September 2000	Spacewatch	Kitt Peak	5.218	0.047	29.8	4.973	5.464	9.7 km	–	catalog · MPC · JPL
(486025) 2012 TX_{14}	3 July 2011	Pan-STARRS 1	Haleakala	5.225	0.032	9.7	5.056	5.395	9.4 km	–	catalog · MPC · JPL
(486026) 2012 TM_{15}	30 August 2011	Pan-STARRS 1	Haleakala	5.185	0.041	3.5	4.973	5.396	8.0 km	–	catalog · MPC · JPL
(486028) 2012 TX_{28}	26 February 2007	MLS	Mount Lemmon	5.217	0.071	30.7	4.846	5.587	10 km	–	catalog · MPC · JPL
(486033) 2012 TV_{79}	21 September 2012	Spacewatch	Kitt Peak	5.237	0.118	6.6	4.619	5.855	7.7 km	–	catalog · MPC · JPL
(486039) 2012 TQ_{124}	7 May 2010	WISE	WISE	5.196	0.161	9.1	4.359	6.033	7.1 km	–	catalog · MPC · JPL
(486041) 2012 TY_{127}	7 October 2012	Pan-STARRS 1	Haleakala	5.223	0.132	14.5	4.534	5.911	8.5 km	–	catalog · MPC · JPL
(486044) 2012 TB_{143}	24 August 2011	Pan-STARRS 1	Haleakala	5.198	0.039	10.6	4.996	5.399	6.8 km	–	catalog · MPC · JPL
(486057) 2012 TE_{210}	29 August 2011	Pan-STARRS 1	Haleakala	5.244	0.041	22.8	5.027	5.461	7.4 km	–	catalog · MPC · JPL
(486060) 2012 TF_{237}	7 October 2012	Pan-STARRS 1	Haleakala	5.176	0.046	18.4	4.937	5.414	8.3 km	–	catalog · MPC · JPL
(486073) 2012 UM_{18}	10 October 2012	MLS	Mount Lemmon	5.296	0.065	11.0	4.953	5.639	7.8 km	–	catalog · MPC · JPL
(486074) 2012 UN_{18}	19 September 2011	MLS	Mount Lemmon	5.201	0.065	8.1	4.862	5.540	7.0 km	–	catalog · MPC · JPL
(486673) 2013 SZ_{75}	25 February 2006	Spacewatch	Kitt Peak	5.218	0.089	10.6	4.753	5.682	5.9 km	–	catalog · MPC · JPL
(486675) 2013 TP_{19}	1 September 2013	MLS	Mount Lemmon	5.146	0.076	9.5	4.755	5.536	7.8 km	–	catalog · MPC · JPL
(486677) 2013 TH_{32}	1 April 2008	Spacewatch	Kitt Peak	5.187	0.063	11.3	4.859	5.514	8.5 km	–	catalog · MPC · JPL
(486678) 2013 TE_{73}	26 August 2012	Pan-STARRS 1	Haleakala	5.257	0.135	9.8	4.550	5.964	7.4 km	–	catalog · MPC · JPL
(486679) 2013 TC_{78}	7 October 2012	Pan-STARRS 1	Haleakala	5.190	0.034	14.3	5.012	5.369	9.8 km	–	catalog · MPC · JPL
(486681) 2013 TM_{88}	15 March 2007	Spacewatch	Kitt Peak	5.252	0.033	31.1	5.079	5.425	12 km	–	catalog · MPC · JPL
(486686) 2013 TD_{117}	4 October 2013	MLS	Mount Lemmon	5.166	0.070	9.0	4.805	5.526	7.0 km	–	catalog · MPC · JPL
(486690) 2013 UG_{15}	12 October 2013	MLS	Mount Lemmon	5.124	0.095	18.7	4.638	5.610	7.5 km	–	catalog · MPC · JPL
(486691) 2013 VD_{9}	23 January 2006	Spacewatch	Kitt Peak	5.151	0.048	15.5	4.903	5.400	9.7 km	–	catalog · MPC · JPL
(486695) 2013 WP_{63}	11 April 2010	WISE	WISE	5.202	0.097	22.6	4.696	5.708	13 km	–	catalog · MPC · JPL
(487447) 2014 RR_{63}	11 September 2014	Pan-STARRS 1	Haleakala	5.226	0.058	27.6	4.923	5.530	9.8 km	–	catalog · MPC · JPL
(487506) 2014 SL_{349}	18 September 2014	Pan-STARRS 1	Haleakala	5.141	0.060	28.9	4.831	5.451	7.7 km	–	catalog · MPC · JPL
(487535) 2014 UW_{169}	26 October 2014	Pan-STARRS 1	Haleakala	5.226	0.070	19.9	4.861	5.590	9.1 km	–	catalog · MPC · JPL
(487539) 2014 UV_{187}	13 August 2012	Pan-STARRS 1	Haleakala	5.175	0.060	4.6	4.866	5.484	7.4 km	–	catalog · MPC · JPL
(487545) 2014 UB_{204}	24 August 2012	Spacewatch	Kitt Peak	5.133	0.060	10.3	4.826	5.441	7.4 km	–	catalog · MPC · JPL
(487552) 2014 VT_{22}	3 October 2014	MLS	Mount Lemmon	5.094	0.048	28.2	4.848	5.340	8.8 km	–	catalog · MPC · JPL
(487553) 2014 VP_{24}	22 August 2011	Pan-STARRS 1	Haleakala	5.186	0.068	15.1	4.834	5.539	10 km	–	catalog · MPC · JPL
(487554) 2014 VZ_{24}	2 July 2011	Spacewatch	Kitt Peak	5.175	0.057	7.3	4.881	5.468	8.4 km	–	catalog · MPC · JPL
(487555) 2014 VA_{25}	16 July 2013	Pan-STARRS 1	Haleakala	5.253	0.067	12.7	4.899	5.607	8.7 km	–	catalog · MPC · JPL
(487570) 2014 WU_{364}	28 November 2014	CSS	Catalina	5.216	0.069	31.9	4.858	5.574	13 km	–	catalog · MPC · JPL
(487571) 2014 WL_{366}	24 February 2006	MLS	Mount Lemmon	5.201	0.098	8.5	4.690	5.713	8.6 km	–	catalog · MPC · JPL
(487572) 2014 WG_{387}	24 February 2006	MLS	Mount Lemmon	5.213	0.092	16.7	4.733	5.693	8.8 km	–	catalog · MPC · JPL
(487573) 2014 WZ_{391}	24 April 2008	Spacewatch	Kitt Peak	5.233	0.050	22.0	4.969	5.497	9.2 km	–	catalog · MPC · JPL
(488189) 2015 XN_{167}	21 June 2010	MLS	Mount Lemmon	5.234	0.059	29.6	4.926	5.542	9.2 km	–	catalog · MPC · JPL
(488223) 2016 AT_{5}	27 April 2010	WISE	WISE	5.279	0.086	28.3	4.827	5.732	14 km	–	catalog · MPC · JPL
(488230) 2016 AR_{44}	6 October 2012	Pan-STARRS 1	Haleakala	5.145	0.016	9.2	5.066	5.225	6.8 km	–	catalog · MPC · JPL
(488235) 2016 AH_{77}	2 February 2005	Spacewatch	Kitt Peak	5.231	0.069	23.8	4.870	5.592	9.9 km	–	catalog · MPC · JPL
(488243) 2016 BZ	4 February 2005	MLS	Mount Lemmon	5.239	0.118	12.2	4.621	5.857	11 km	–	catalog · MPC · JPL
(489083) 2006 AZ_{93}	7 January 2006	MLS	Mount Lemmon	5.248	0.020	30.9	5.142	5.353	12 km	–	catalog · MPC · JPL
(489101) 2006 BJ_{188}	28 January 2006	Spacewatch	Kitt Peak	5.189	0.025	35.6	5.059	5.319	9.7 km	–	catalog · MPC · JPL
(489827) 2008 ES_{68}	10 March 2008	MLS	Mount Lemmon	5.194	0.072	28.3	4.820	5.568	8.5 km	–	catalog · MPC · JPL
(489879) 2008 GA_{139}	1 April 2008	Spacewatch	Kitt Peak	5.190	0.012	25.0	5.129	5.251	8.3 km	–	catalog · MPC · JPL
(491033) 2011 QY_{3}	4 August 2011	Pan-STARRS 1	Haleakala	5.218	0.042	21.1	5.000	5.436	7.3 km	–	catalog · MPC · JPL
(491067) 2011 QB_{85}	9 August 2011	Pan-STARRS 1	Haleakala	5.214	0.099	17.1	4.696	5.732	7.7 km	–	catalog · MPC · JPL
(491157) 2011 SE_{216}	8 May 2010	WISE	WISE	5.221	0.066	28.7	4.875	5.567	9.7 km	–	catalog · MPC · JPL
(491611) 2012 TX_{51}	19 January 2005	Spacewatch	Kitt Peak	5.270	0.032	16.3	5.103	5.436	12 km	–	catalog · MPC · JPL
(492242) 2013 TC_{133}	16 March 2007	MLS	Mount Lemmon	5.248	0.051	9.9	4.979	5.517	11 km	–	catalog · MPC · JPL
(493447) 2014 WK_{366}	24 March 2010	WISE	WISE	5.167	0.092	35.8	4.693	5.641	12 km	–	catalog · MPC · JPL
(498536) 2008 FT_{130}	30 March 2008	Spacewatch	Kitt Peak	5.233	0.063	9.9	4.903	5.563	7.1 km	–	catalog · MPC · JPL
(499113) 2009 HZ_{54}	20 April 2009	Spacewatch	Kitt Peak	5.222	0.135	17.4	4.517	5.928	7.4 km	–	catalog · MPC · JPL

back to top
