= Needville, Texas =

- City
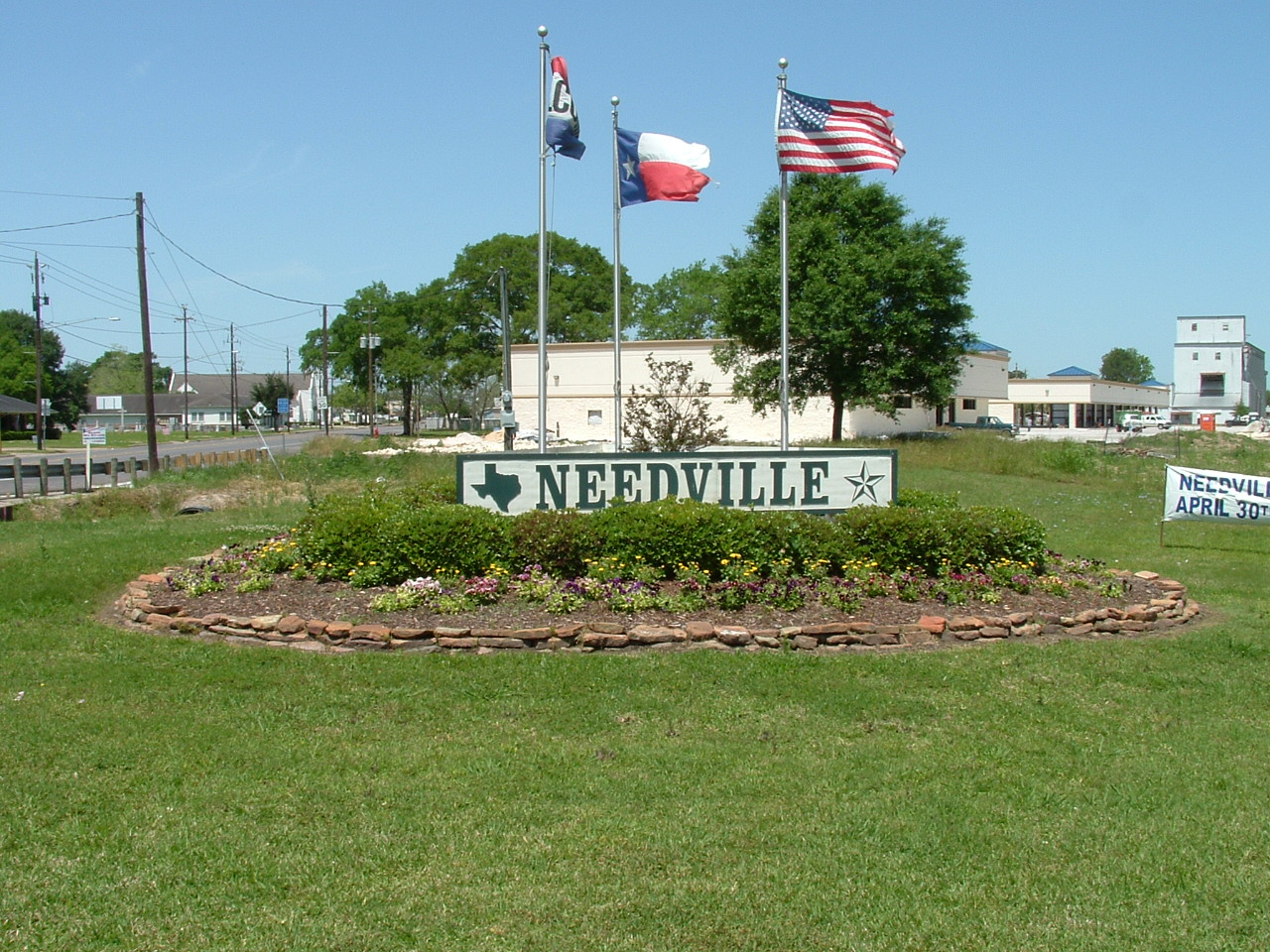
- Gateway Sign into Needville
- Motto: "The Home of Friendly People"
- Location of Needville, Texas
- Coordinates: 29°23′54″N 95°50′24″W
- Country: United States
- State: Texas
- County: Fort Bend

Area
  - Total: 2.01 sq mi (5.21 km^{2})
  - Land: 2.01 sq mi (5.20 km^{2})
  - Water: 0.0039 sq mi (0.01 km^{2})
- Elevation: 89 ft (27 m)

Population (2020)
  - Total: 3,089
  - Density: 1,545.4/sq mi (596.67/km^{2})
- Time zone: UTC-6 (Central (CST))
  - Summer (DST): UTC-5 (CDT)
- ZIP code: 77461
- Area code: 979
- FIPS code: 48-50628
- GNIS feature ID: 1342402
- Website: cityofneedville.com

Needville is a city in Fort Bend County, Texas, United States. It is within the Houston–Pasadena–The Woodlands metropolitan area. The population was 3,089 at the 2020 census.

== History ==
August Schendel founded the town of Schendelville in 1891 that contained his house, a store and a cotton gin. In 1894, he applied for a post office using the name "Needmore" as a joke, since they always needed more of everything. Due to Needmore, Texas already existing, the post office amended the name to "Needville".

By 1898, Schendel had officially platted a town and begun selling lots. A school had been constructed in 1897. By 1903, Needville had a school for white children with one teacher and 97 pupils, and one school for black children with one teacher and 45 pupils. The Round Hall building had been built about 1910 for dances and other social activities, and remained in this service until the 1950s.

Needville had three general stores, two cotton gins, a movie theater, and a population of 100 in 1914. Telephone service arrived in 1916. In 1918, the Needville State Bank opened and the Galveston, Harrisburg and San Antonio Railway built a line through the town. In 1920, Needville reported having a population of 500. It also reported having 12 general stores, four churches, four gins, and an electric power generation plant. (Note: The power generating plant was bought by Houston Light and Power Company (H.L.&P.) in 1926 and named for W. A. Farish, its president.)

From 1927 through 1931, the Fort Bend county fair was held in Needville. It was then discontinued because of the Great Depression, which caused the fair to run heavily into debt. Natural gas was piped into town in 1929. FM 36 was completed in 1932, allowing all-weather access to Needville. Thereafter, a local school bus transported high school students to schools in Richmond and Rosenberg. Needville formed its own Independent School District (I.S.D.) in 1946 and opened its own high school in 1948. Needville I.S.D. opened a new elementary school in 1960. Integration of black and white schools was completed in 1966.

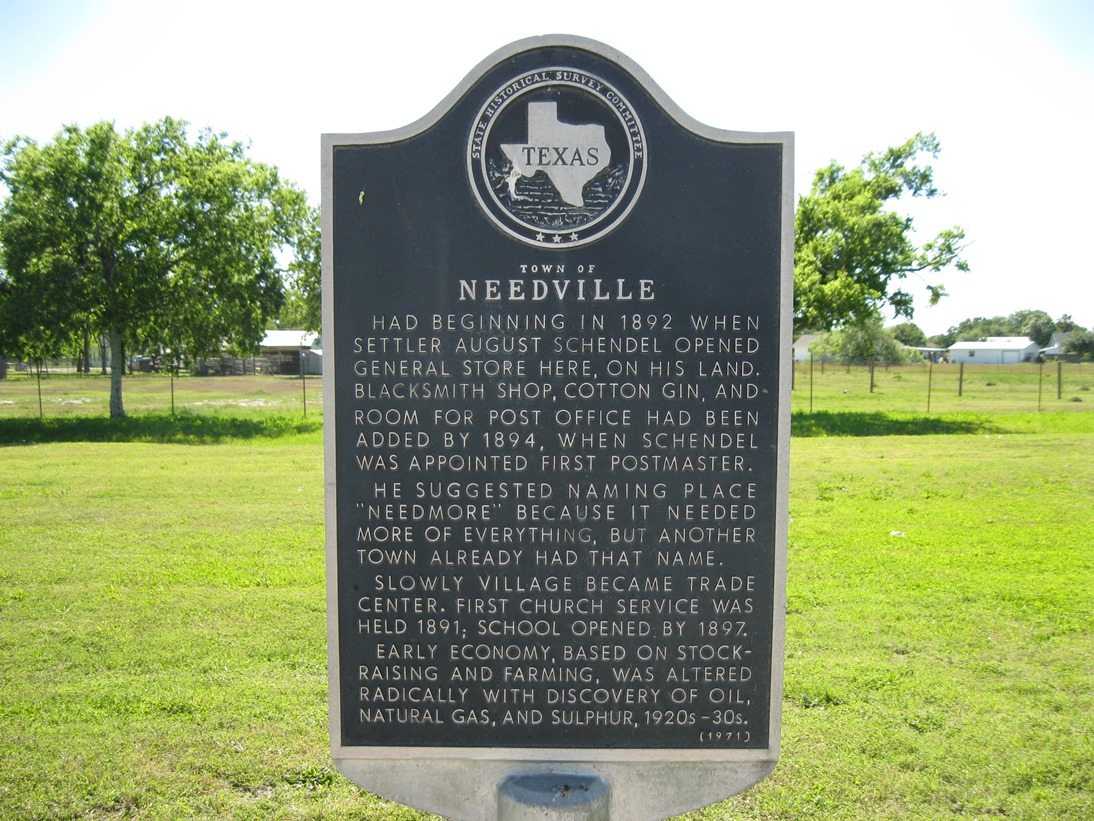
Needville historical marker

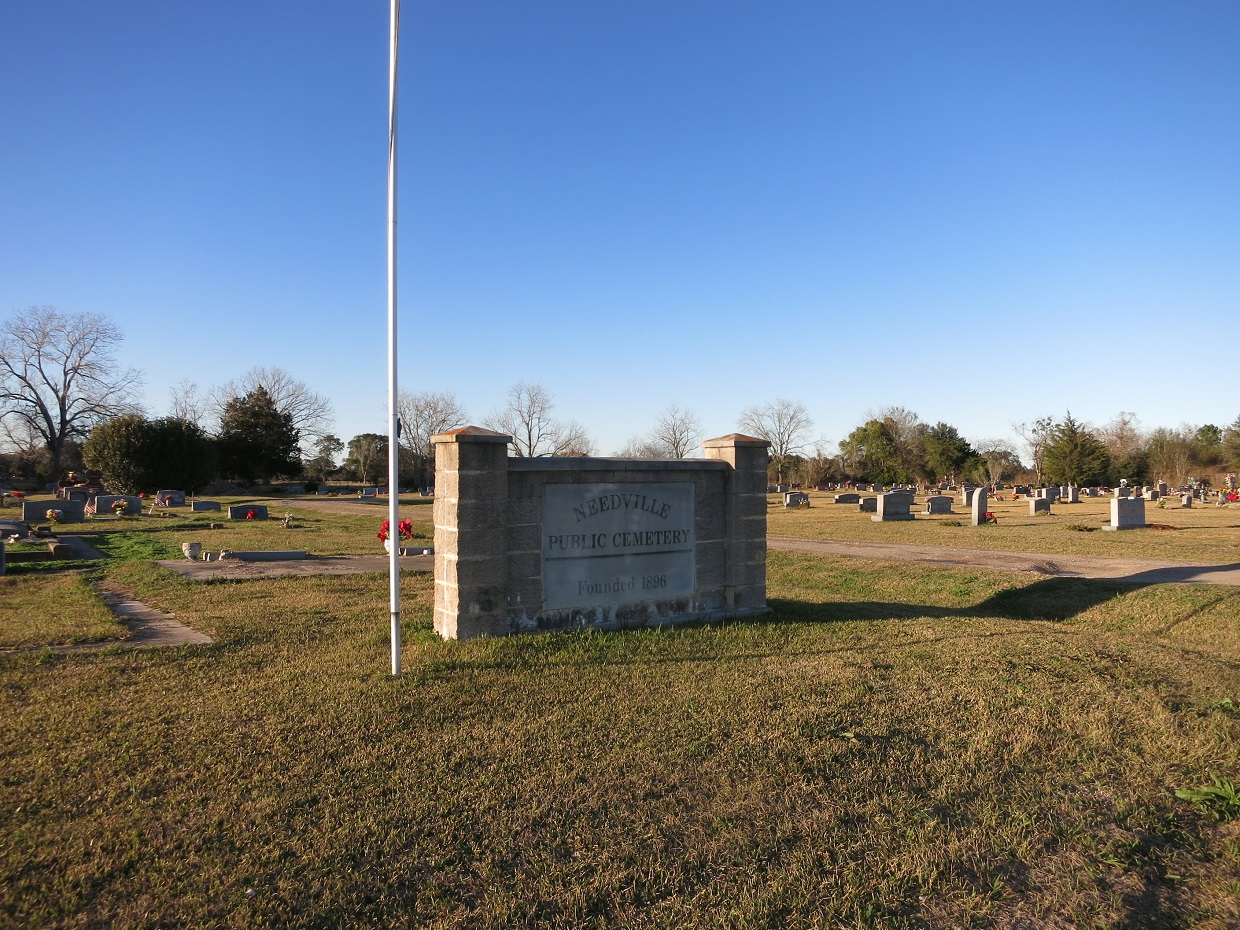
Needville Public Cemetery

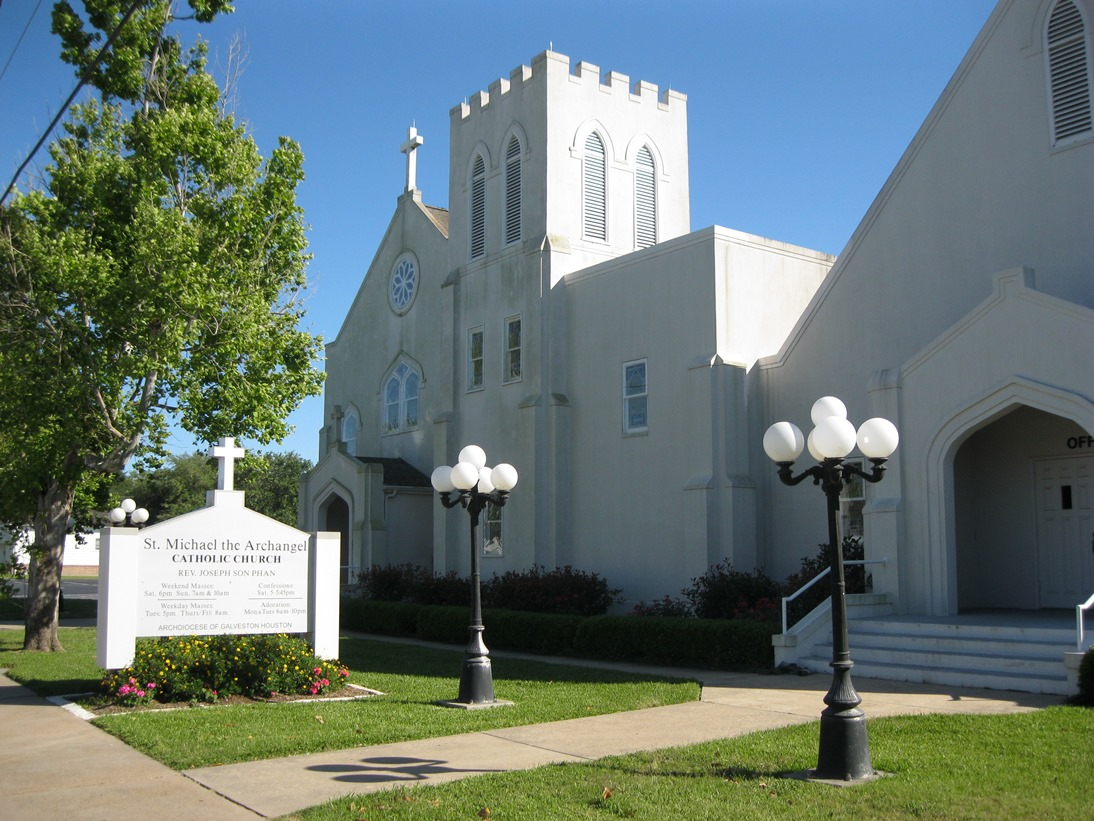
St. Michael's Catholic Church

== Geography ==
Needville is located in southern Fort Bend County at 29°23′54″N 95°50′24″W (29.398232, –95.839880). Texas State Highway 36 passes through the city, leading north 11 miles (18 km) to Rosenberg and southeast 21 miles (34 km) to West Columbia. Downtown Houston is 41 miles (66 km) to the northeast. Farm to Market Road 360 starts at SH 36 and heads northwest to Beasley, while Farm to Market Road 1236 goes southwest, then southeastward. Needville-Fairchilds Road connects with the community of Fairchilds to the northeast.

According to the United States Census Bureau, the city of Needville has a total area of 1.72 square miles (4.46 km^{2}), all land.

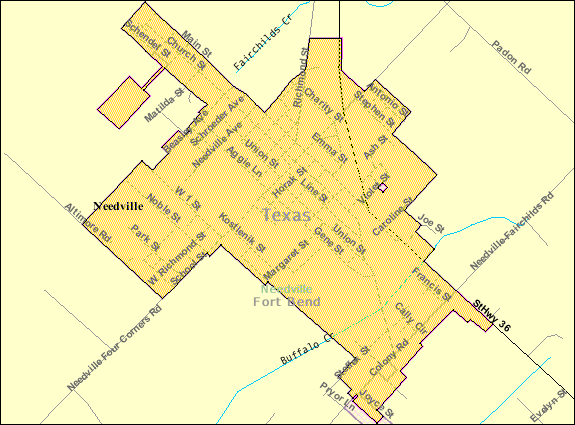
Map of Needville

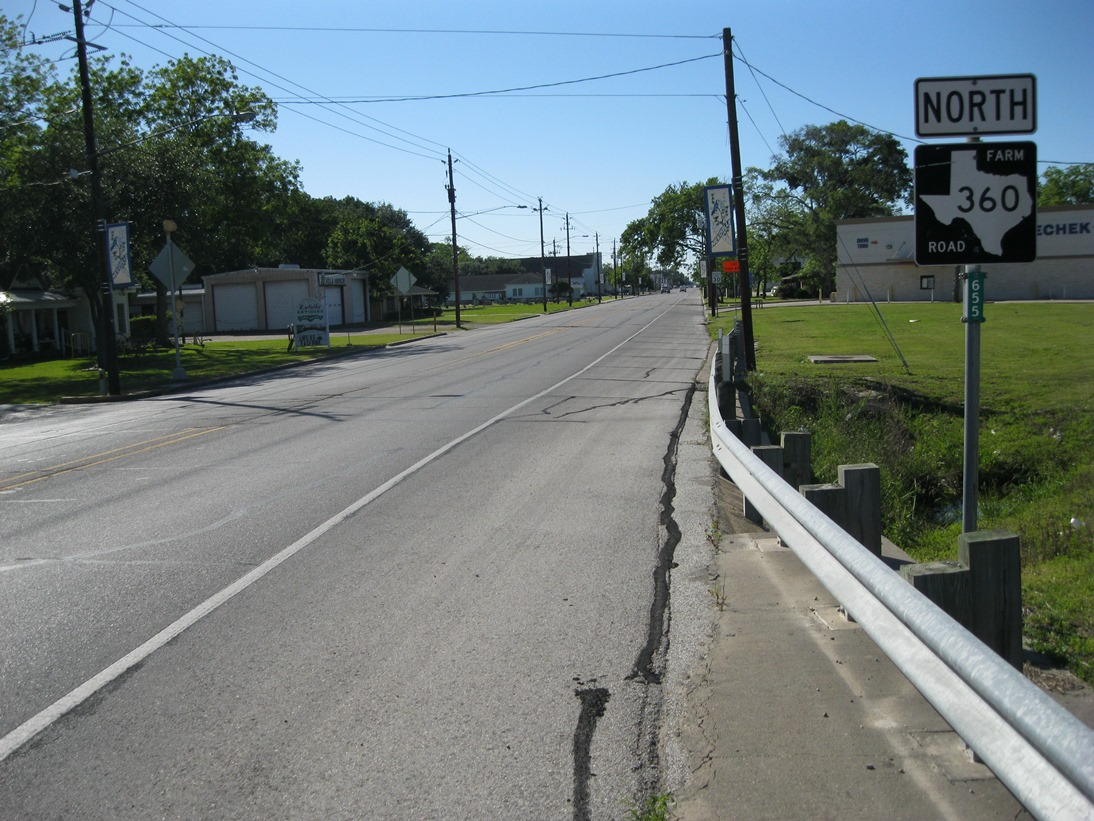
FM 360 just north of Hwy 36

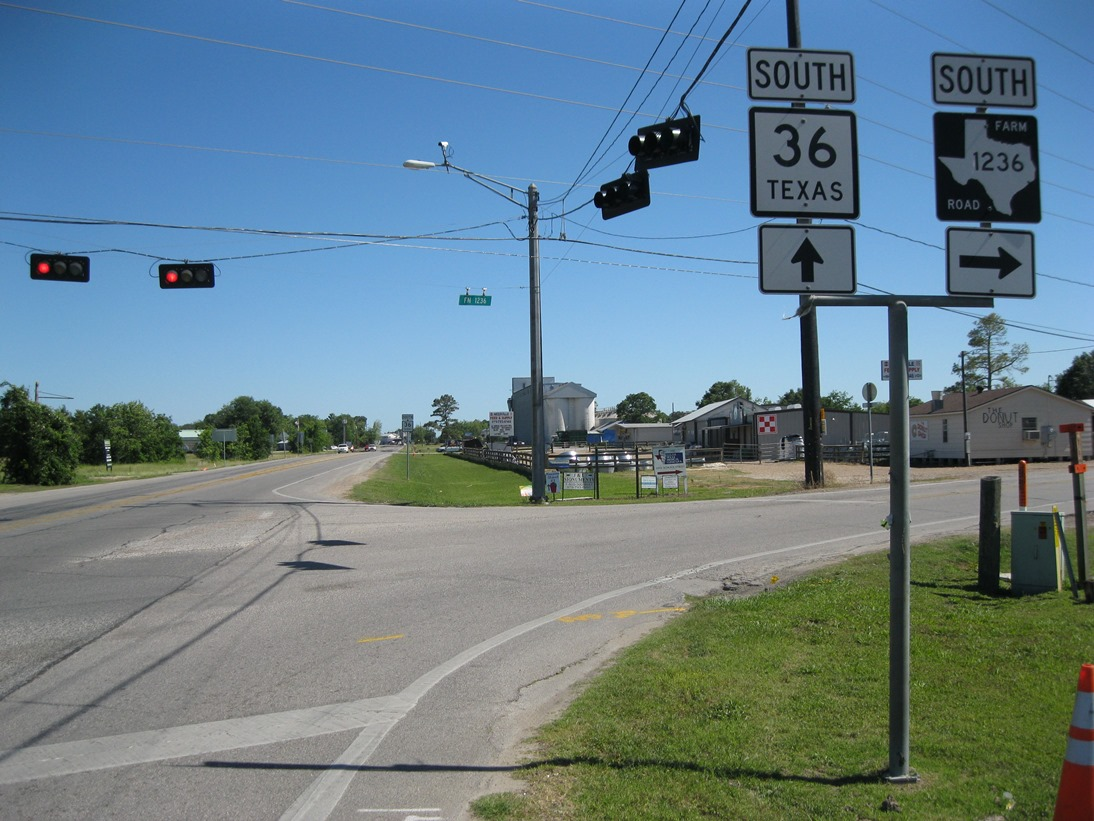
End of FM 1236 at Hwy 36

== Demographics ==
Historical population
Census	Pop.	Note	%±
1950	609		—
1960	861		41.4%
1970	1,024		18.9%
1980	1,417		38.4%
1990	2,199		55.2%
2000	2,609		18.6%
2010	2,823		8.2%
2020	3,089		9.4%
U.S. Decennial Census

=== Racial and ethnic composition ===
Needville city, Texas – Racial and ethnic composition Note: the US Census treats Hispanic/Latino as an ethnic category. This table excludes Latinos from the racial categories and assigns them to a separate category. Hispanics/Latinos may be of any race.
Race / Ethnicity (NH = Non-Hispanic)	Pop 2000	Pop 2010	Pop 2020	% 2000	% 2010	% 2020
White alone (NH)	1,609	1,788	1,797	61.67%	63.34%	58.17%
Black or African American alone (NH)	341	289	257	13.07%	10.24%	8.32%
Native American or Alaska Native alone (NH)	4	4	7	0.15%	0.14%	0.23%
Asian alone (NH)	3	15	21	0.11%	0.53%	0.68%
Native Hawaiian or Pacific Islander alone (NH)	0	0	0	0.00%	0.00%	0.00%
Other race alone (NH)	3	1	5	0.11%	0.04%	0.16%
Mixed race or Multiracial (NH)	24	30	99	0.92%	1.06%	3.20%
Hispanic or Latino (any race)	625	696	903	23.96%	24.65%	29.23%
Total	2,609	2,823	3,089	100.00%	100.00%	100.00%

=== 2020 census ===
As of the 2020 census, Needville had a population of 3,089. The median age was 37.5 years. 26.3% of residents were under the age of 18 and 14.6% of residents were 65 years of age or older. For every 100 females there were 91.9 males, and for every 100 females age 18 and over there were 91.0 males age 18 and over.

0.0% of residents lived in urban areas, while 100.0% lived in rural areas.

There were 1,126 households in Needville, of which 39.8% had children under the age of 18 living in them. Of all households, 50.9% were married-couple households, 14.9% were households with a male householder and no spouse or partner present, and 28.6% were households with a female householder and no spouse or partner present. About 21.3% of all households were made up of individuals and 10.4% had someone living alone who was 65 years of age or older.

There were 929 families residing in the city.

There were 1,192 housing units, of which 5.5% were vacant. The homeowner vacancy rate was 1.3% and the rental vacancy rate was 6.3%.

Racial composition as of the 2020 census
Race	Number	Percent
White	2,016	65.3%
Black or African American	262	8.5%
American Indian and Alaska Native	29	0.9%
Asian	22	0.7%
Native Hawaiian and Other Pacific Islander	0	0.0%
Some other race	294	9.5%
Two or more races	466	15.1%
Hispanic or Latino (of any race)	903	29.2%

=== 2000 census ===
As of the census of 2000, there were 2,609 people, 926 households, and 688 families residing in the city. The population density was 1,532.5 inhabitants per square mile (591.7/km^{2}). There were 979 housing units at an average density of 575.1 per square mile (222.0/km^{2}). The racial makeup of the city was 74.09% White, 13.19% African American, 0.27% Native American, 0.11% Asian, 10.23% from other races, and 2.11% from two or more races. Hispanic or Latino of any race were 23.96% of the population.

The median income for a household in the city was $41,202, and the median income for a family was $48,824. Males had a median income of $35,200 versus $26,389 for females. The per capita income for the city was $17,802. About 8.9% of families and 11.5% of the population were below the poverty line, including 16.8% of those under age 18 and 18.8% of those age 65 or over.

== Government and infrastructure ==
The United States Postal Service Needville Post Office is located at 3000 School Street.

Fort Bend County does not have a hospital district. OakBend Medical Center serves as the county's charity hospital with which the county contracts.

EMS is provided through Fort Bend County, and has one station that houses Squad 601, located at 3743 School St.

Fire is provided through Needville Fire Department, contracted by Fort Bend ESD #9. Needville Fire Station 1 is located at 3323 Richmond St.

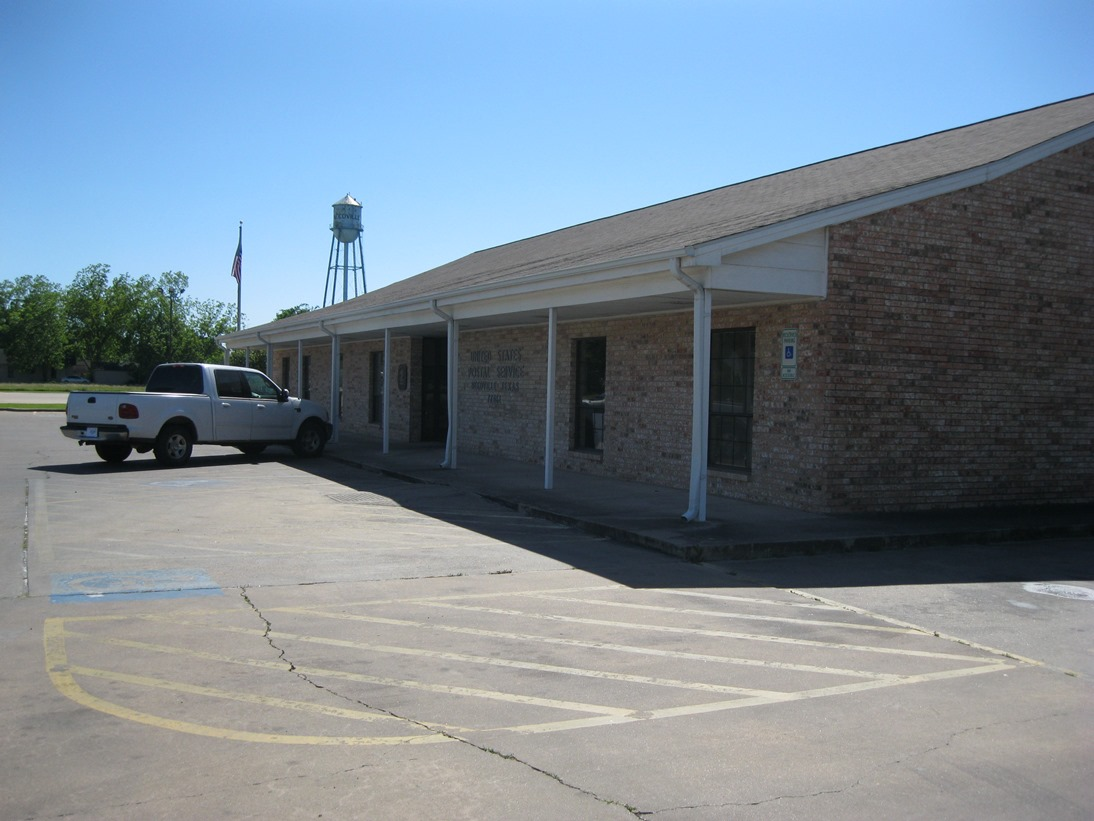
US Post Office on FM 1236

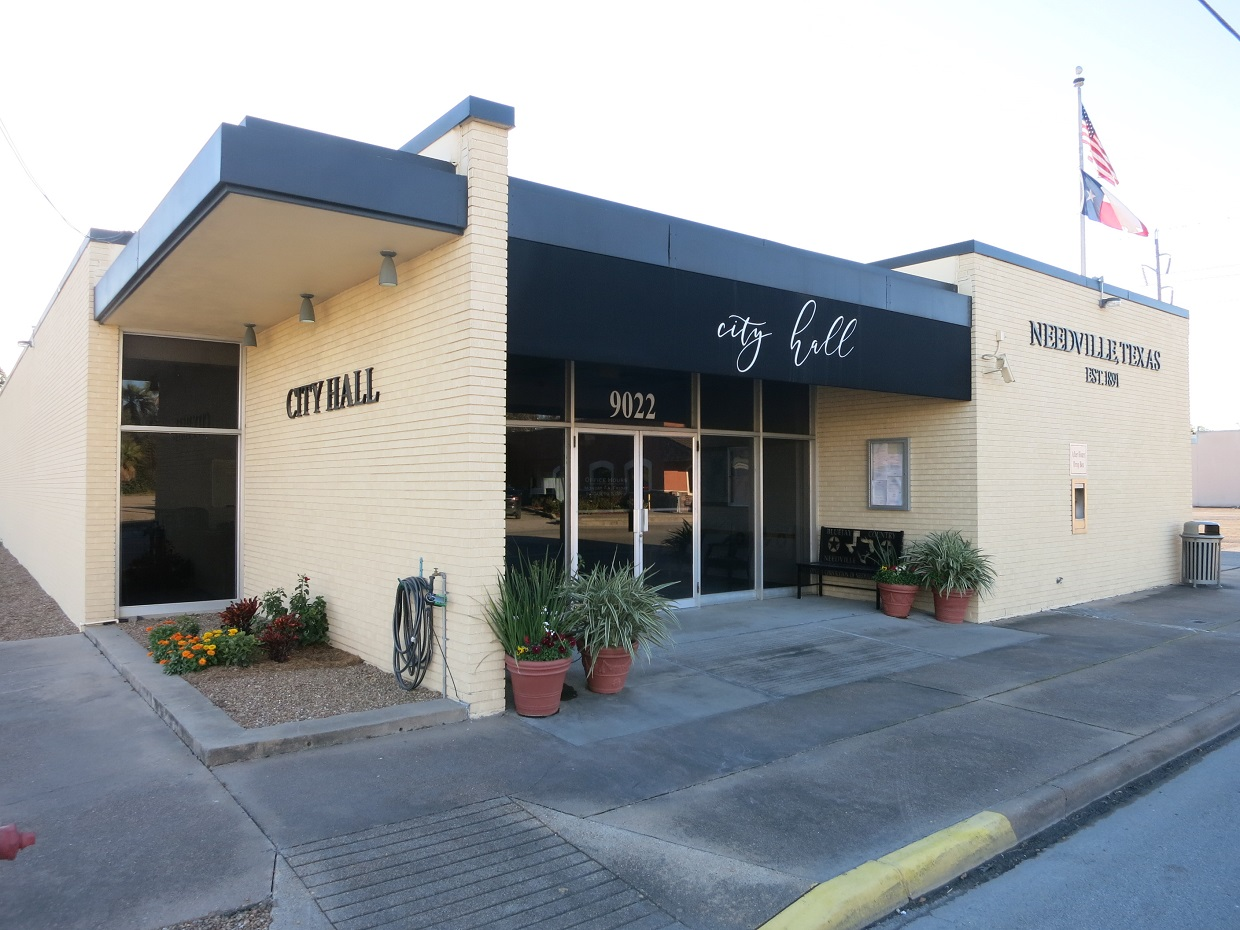
City Hall on FM 360

== Events ==
- The Needville Harvest Festival, founded in 1983, is held every October. The festival is organized by NHF, Inc. to draw visitors to Needville in the hope of stimulating local business, to raise funds for community development, and to fund annual scholarships for local high school students.
- The Needville Citywide Garage Sale is held in March and September each year. There is no website as the participants are homeowners and businesses. Information with a map is normally available at Kinfolks Antiques at (979) 793-7200. Dates can be found on the Chamber of Commerce calendar of events.

== Education ==
Needville is zoned to schools in the Needville Independent School District. High school students go to Needville High School. Needville's Albert George Branch Library is a part of the Fort Bend County Libraries system.

Some addresses not in Needville with "Needville, TX" addresses are zoned to B.F. Terry High School in Rosenberg, a part of Lamar CISD.

The designated community college for Needville ISD (as well as LCISD) is Wharton County Junior College.

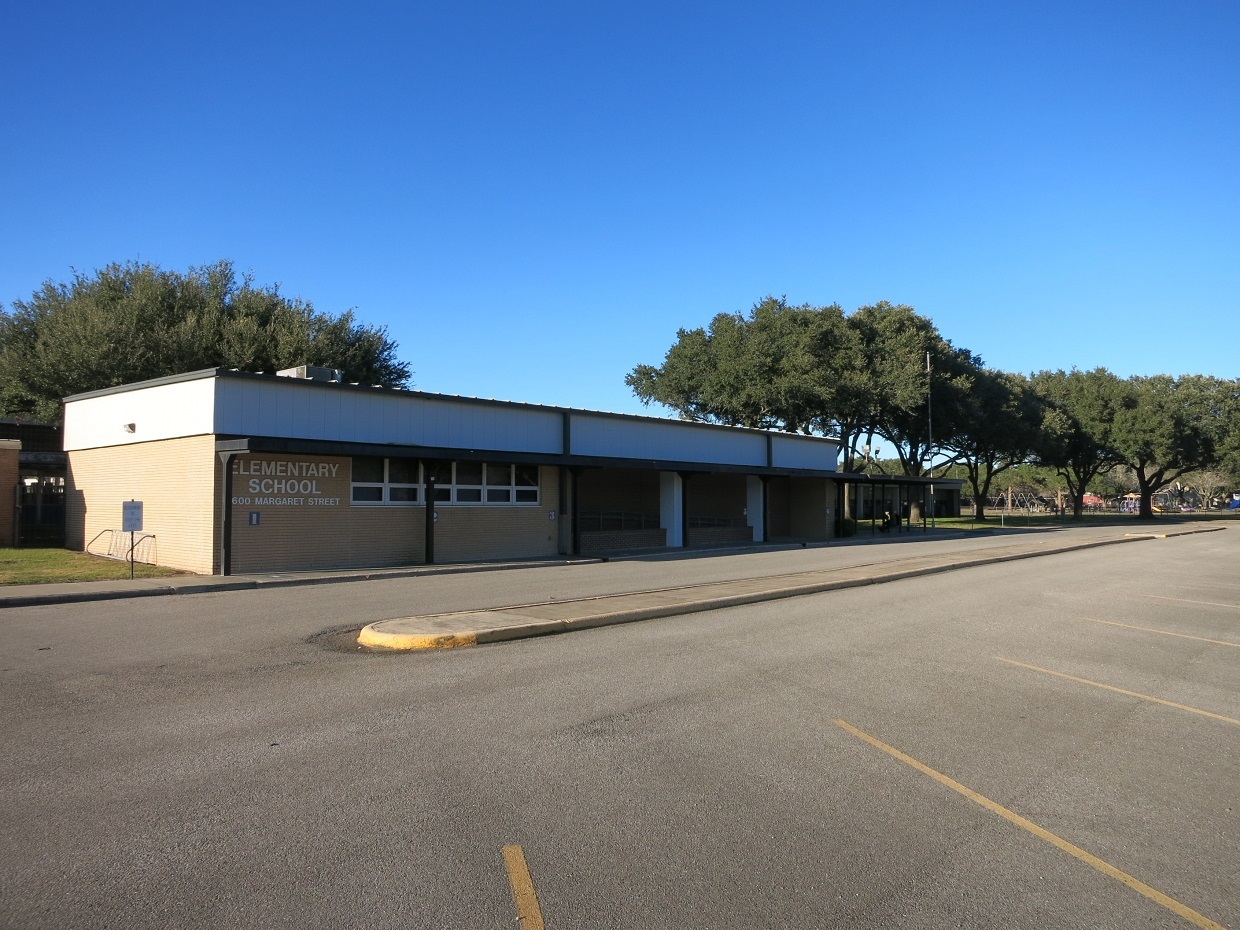
Needville Elementary School (in the Needville city limits)

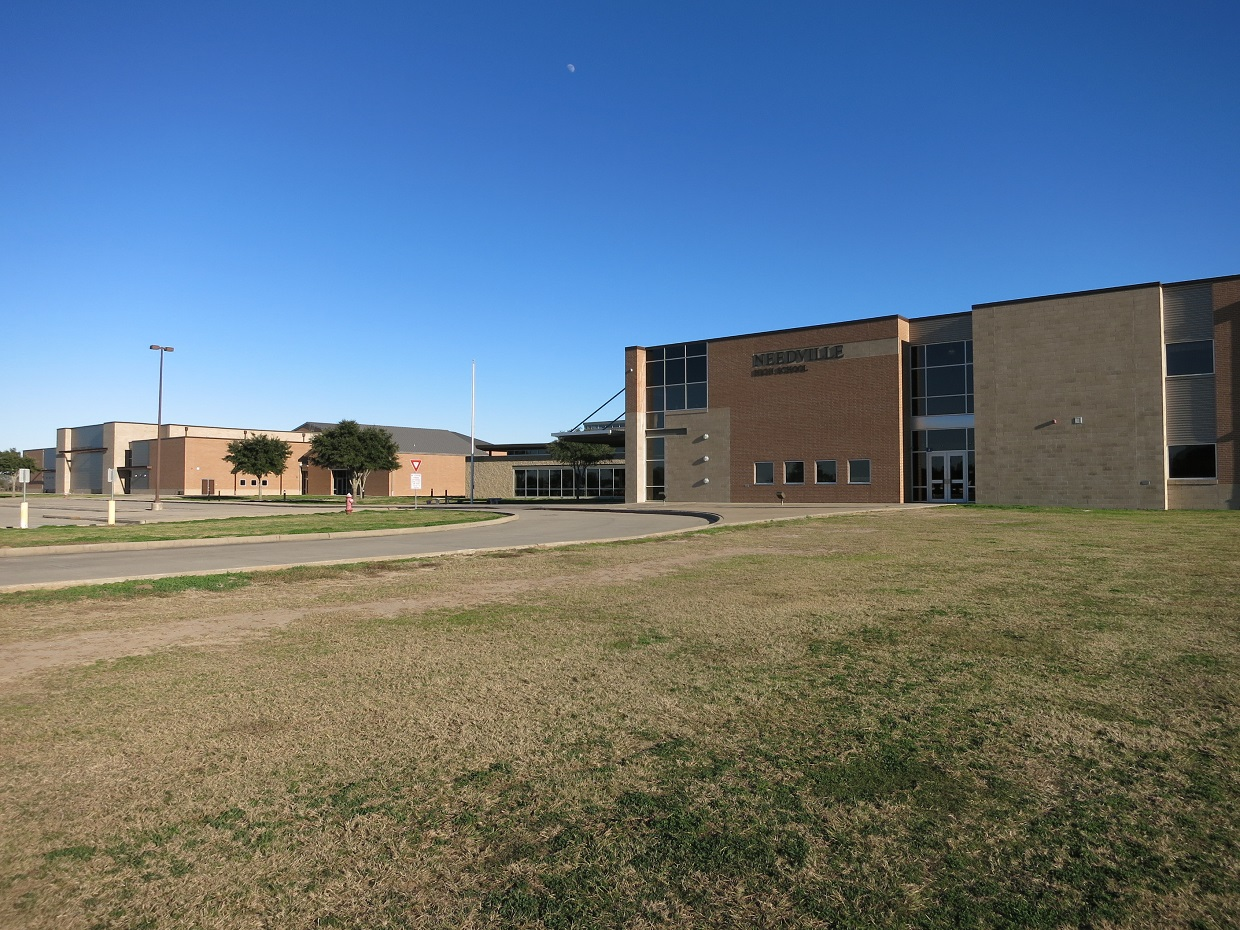
Needville High School

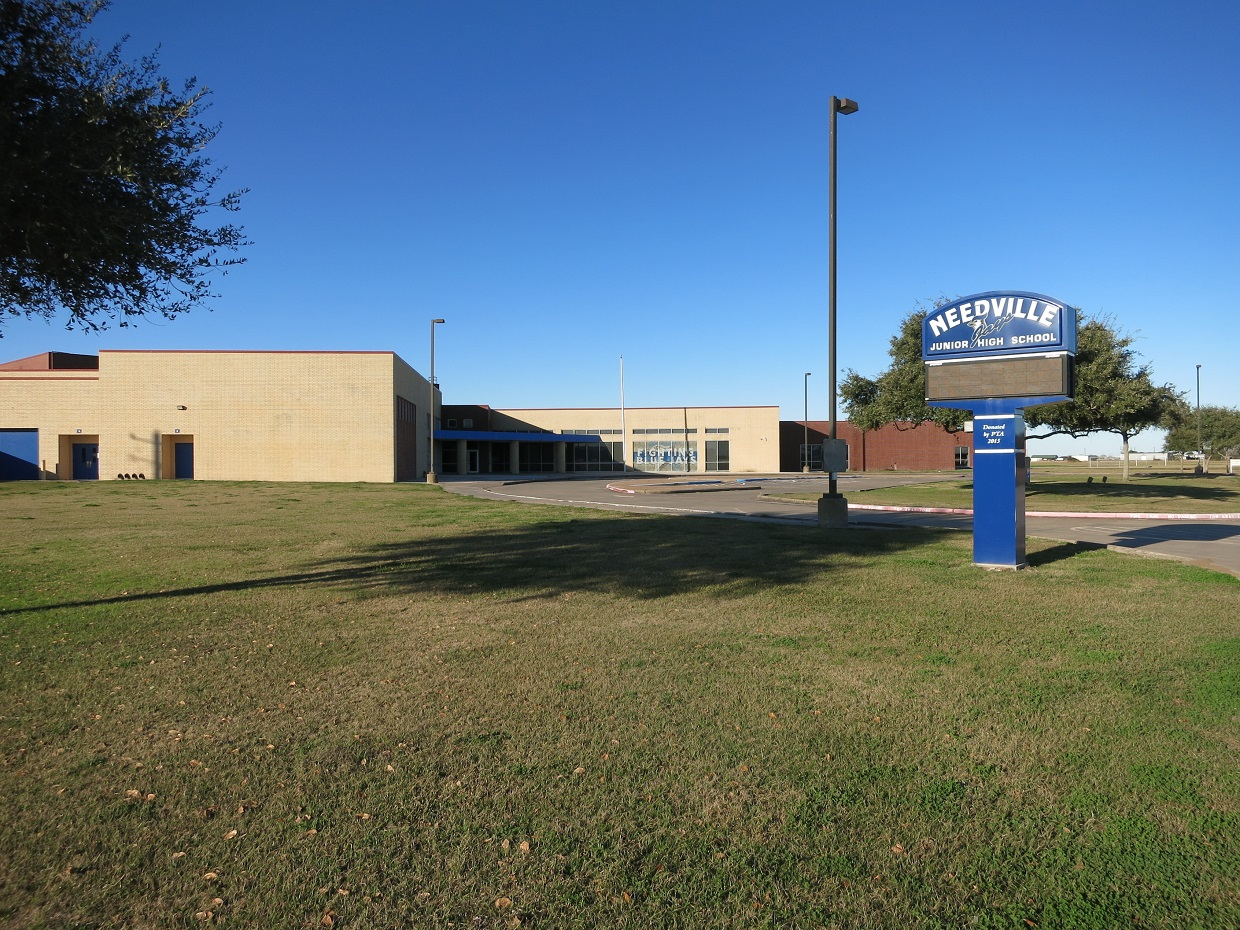
Needville Junior High School

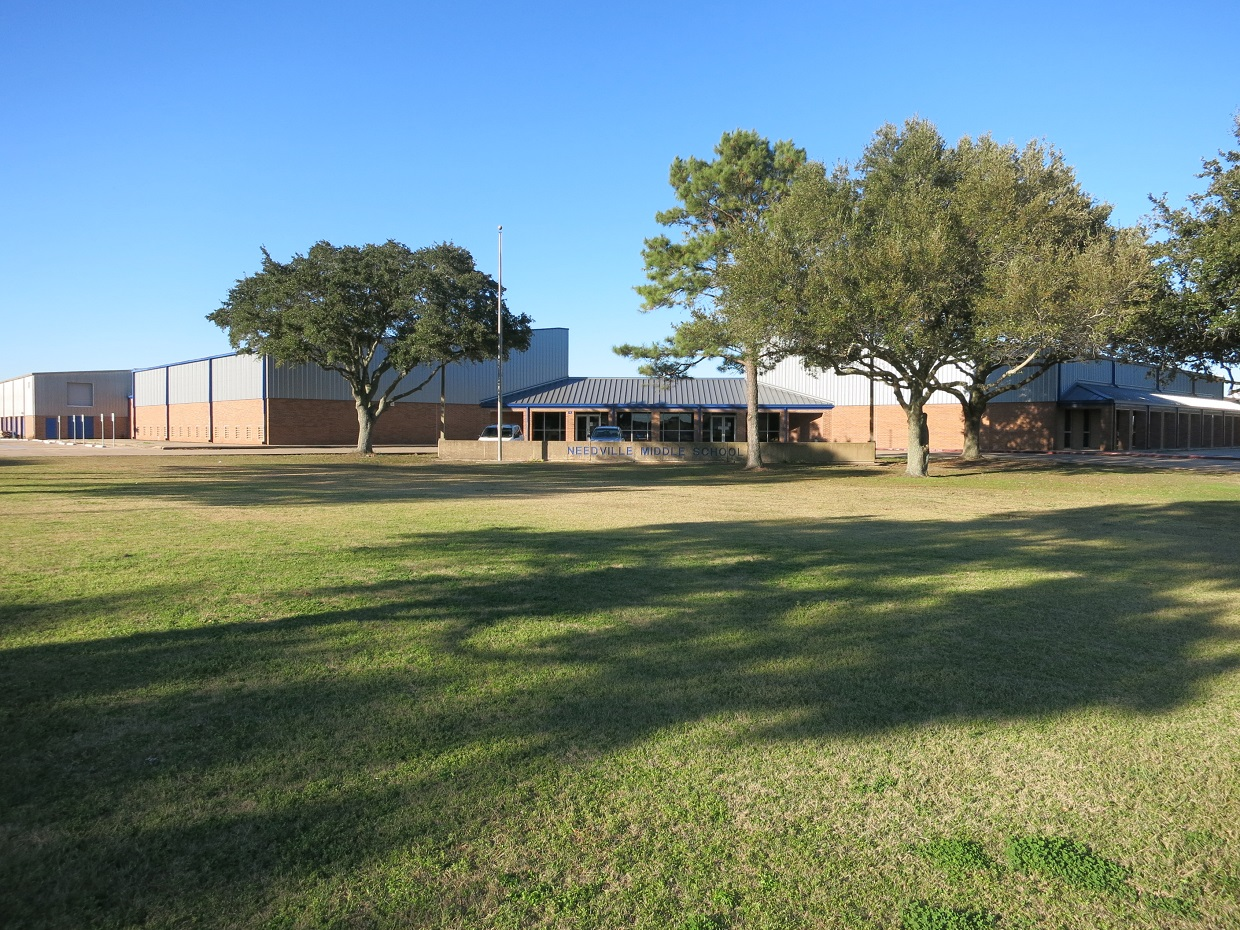
Needville Middle School

=== Public libraries ===
Albert George Branch Library of Fort Bend County Libraries is in Needville. The library, which opened in November 1974, was named after Fort Bend County philanthropist Albert George. The Needville Chamber of Commerce and the Needville Lion's Club donated the land for the library. Originally the library, with its first portion designed by Wylie W. Vale & Associates, had 4,900 square feet (460 m^{2}) of space. In 1997 the library system used bond funds to expand and renovate the library; the library gained a new entrance, a meeting room, and new toilet facilities. The library now has 6,800 square feet (630 m^{2}) of space.

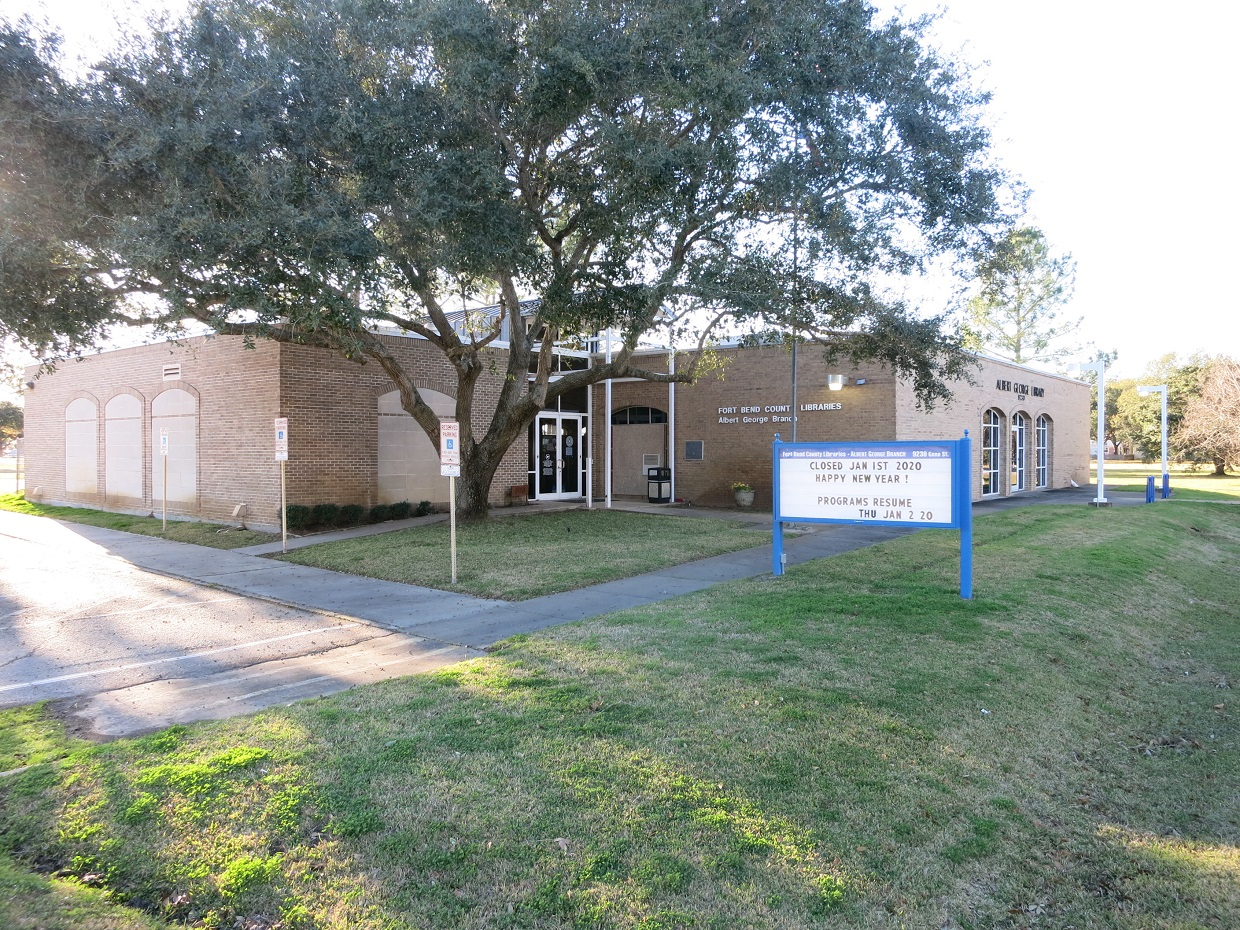
Albert George Library

== Parks and recreation ==
Fort Bend County operates the Barbara Jordan Park in Needville.

Nearby:

- George Ranch Historical Park, educational center
- Brazos Bend State Park and George Observatory

== Business ==
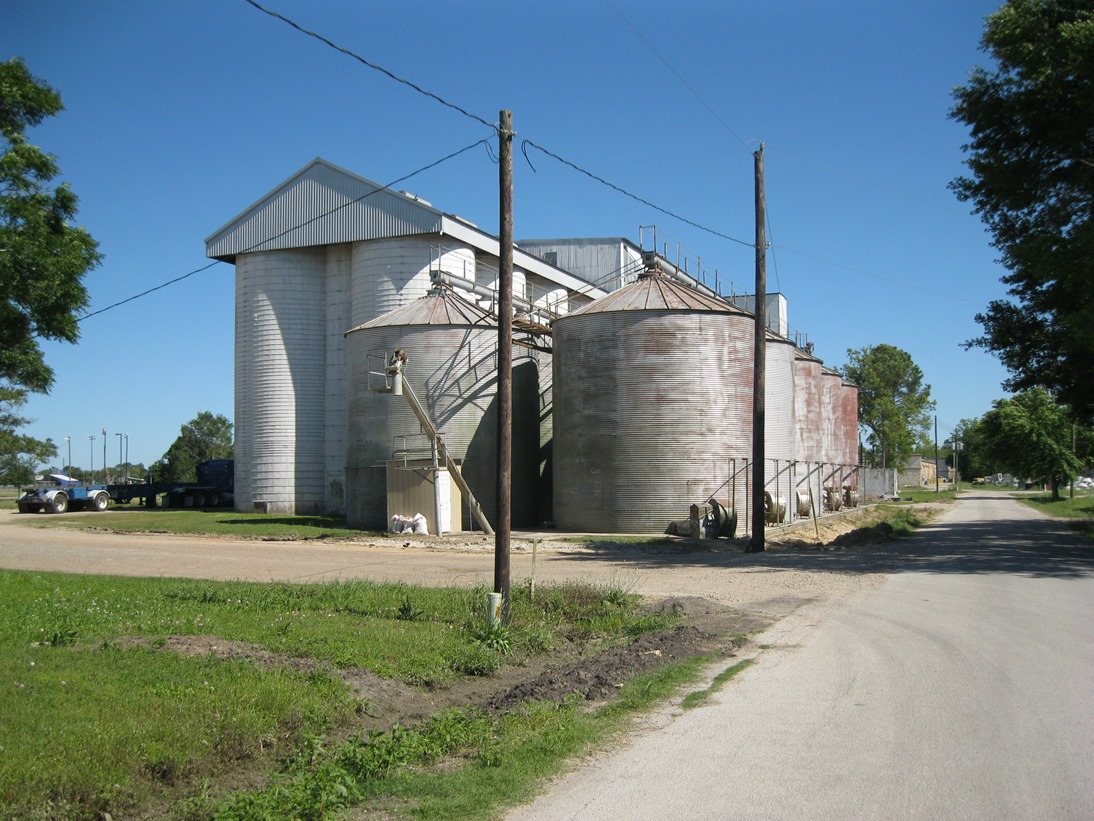
Storage building

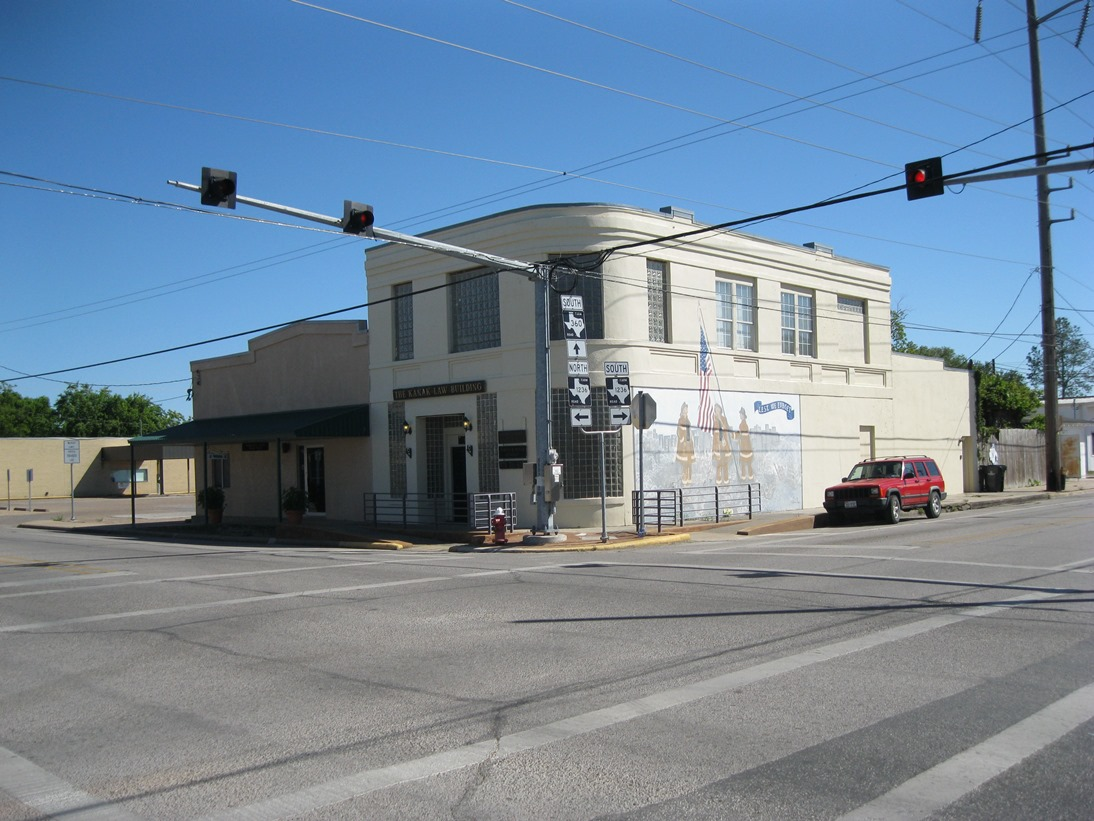
Kanak Law Building

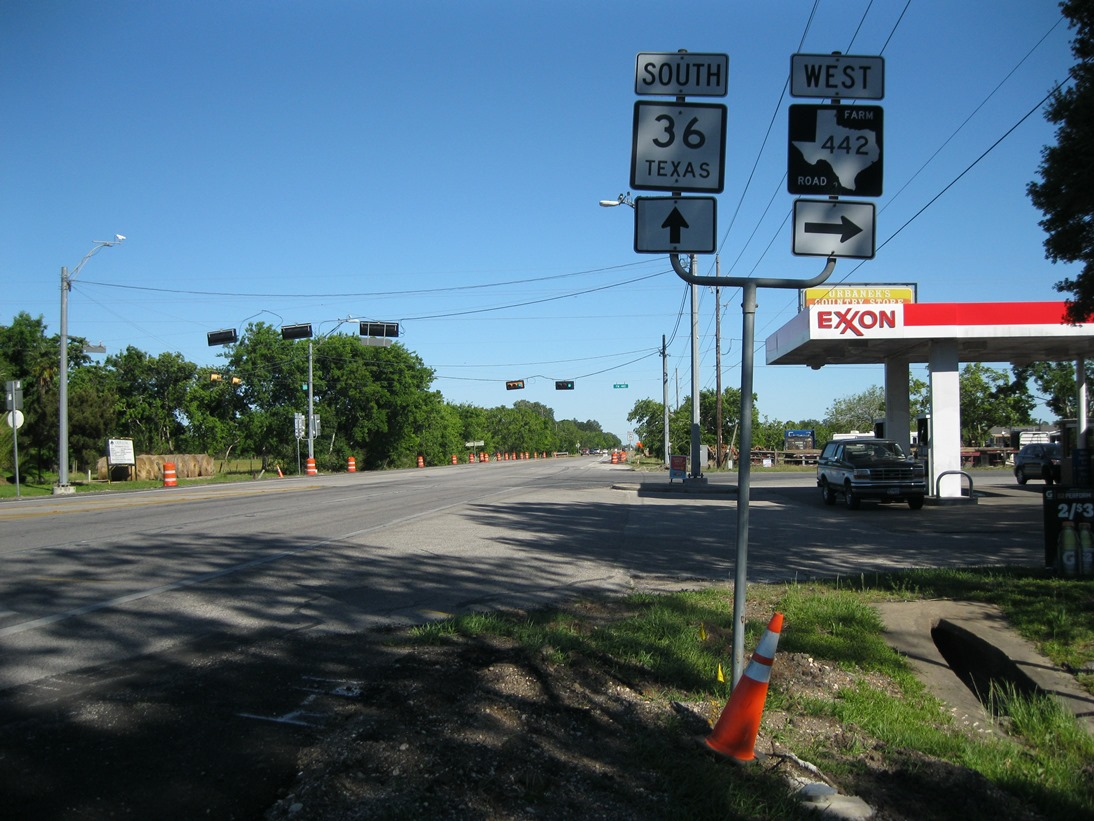
Urbanek's Country Store

== Notable people ==
- Dennis Gaubatz, NFL linebacker
- Earnest Jackson, NFL running back
- Olivia Julianna, American political strategist and abortion rights advocate
