= Needmore, Texas =

Needmore, Texas may refer to:

- Needmore, Bailey County, Texas
- Needmore, Delta County, Texas
- Needmore, Terry County, Texas
- Pleasant Glade, Van Zandt County, Texas, formerly known as Needmore
