= Pleasant Glade, Van Zandt County, Texas =

Ghost town in Texas, US

Pleasant Glade
- Ghost town
- Location in Texas
- Coordinates: 32.39153140°N 95.97385710°W
- Country: United States
- State: Texas
- County: Van Zandt County, Texas|Van Zandt]]

Pleasant Glade, originally Needmore, is a ghost town in Van Zandt County, Texas, United States.

== History ==
Originally known as Needmore, Pleasant Glade began as a farming community. A school was built in 1909, replacing an 1890 schoolhouse, and consolidated with the Canton Independent School District in 1950. Two tornados damaged the community—one in 1924, the other in 1927. Most residents moved during World War II, and the town was a ranching community by the 1990s.
