= List of minor planets: 438001–439000 =

The following is a partial list of minor planets, running from minor-planet number 438001 through 439000, inclusive. The primary data for this and other partial lists is based on JPL's "Small-Body Orbital Elements" and data available from the Minor Planet Center. Critical list information is also provided by the MPC, unless otherwise specified from Lowell Observatory. A detailed description of the table's columns and additional sources are given on the main page including a complete list of every page in this series, and a statistical break-up on the dynamical classification of minor planets.

Also see the summary list of all named bodies in numerical and alphabetical order, and the corresponding naming citations for the number range of this particular list. New namings may only be added to this list after official publication, as the preannouncement of names is condemned by the Working Group for Small Bodies Nomenclature of the International Astronomical Union.

Near-Earth obj.	MBA (inner)	MBA (outer)	Centaur
Mars-crosser	MBA (middle)	Jupiter trojan	Trans-Neptunian obj.
Unclassified

== 438001–438100 ==
Designation			Discovery			Properties		Ref
Permanent	Provisional	Named after	Date	Site	Discoverer(s)	Category	Diam.	Ref
438001	2003 UT_{182}	—	October 21, 2003	Palomar	NEAT	·	760 m	MPC · JPL
438002	2003 UB_{308}	—	October 18, 2003	Kitt Peak	Spacewatch	·	1.9 km	MPC · JPL
438003	2003 UT_{325}	—	October 17, 2003	Apache Point	SDSS	·	1.1 km	MPC · JPL
438004	2003 UX_{375}	—	October 22, 2003	Apache Point	SDSS	·	590 m	MPC · JPL
438005	2003 WQ_{1}	—	November 16, 2003	Catalina	CSS	·	1.1 km	MPC · JPL
438006	2003 WZ_{3}	—	November 16, 2003	Catalina	CSS	·	2.3 km	MPC · JPL
438007	2003 WQ_{16}	—	November 18, 2003	Palomar	NEAT	·	1.5 km	MPC · JPL
438008	2003 WR_{22}	—	November 20, 2003	Socorro	LINEAR	·	1.5 km	MPC · JPL
438009	2003 WU_{22}	—	November 18, 2003	Kitt Peak	Spacewatch	·	1.3 km	MPC · JPL
438010	2003 WT_{25}	—	November 21, 2003	Socorro	LINEAR	·	1.5 km	MPC · JPL
438011	2003 WU_{40}	—	November 19, 2003	Kitt Peak	Spacewatch	·	2.3 km	MPC · JPL
438012	2003 WK_{50}	—	November 19, 2003	Socorro	LINEAR	·	1.4 km	MPC · JPL
438013	2003 WW_{51}	—	November 19, 2003	Kitt Peak	Spacewatch	·	2.6 km	MPC · JPL
438014	2003 XH_{17}	—	December 14, 2003	Kitt Peak	Spacewatch	·	2.0 km	MPC · JPL
438015	2003 XV_{27}	—	November 21, 2003	Kitt Peak	Spacewatch	ADE	1.9 km	MPC · JPL
438016	2003 YH_{1}	—	December 22, 1998	Kitt Peak	Spacewatch	H	510 m	MPC · JPL
438017	2003 YO_{3}	—	December 18, 2003	Socorro	LINEAR	APO	700 m	MPC · JPL
438018	2003 YQ_{17}	—	December 20, 2003	Socorro	LINEAR	·	3.1 km	MPC · JPL
438019	2003 YU_{26}	—	December 18, 2003	Palomar	NEAT	·	2.0 km	MPC · JPL
438020	2003 YH_{140}	—	December 18, 2003	Socorro	LINEAR	EUN	1.2 km	MPC · JPL
438021	2004 BW_{2}	—	December 27, 2003	Socorro	LINEAR	PHO	1.3 km	MPC · JPL
438022	2004 BN_{8}	—	January 17, 2004	Kitt Peak	Spacewatch	·	2.2 km	MPC · JPL
438023	2004 BV_{100}	—	January 19, 2004	Kitt Peak	Spacewatch	V	610 m	MPC · JPL
438024	2004 CD_{26}	—	February 11, 2004	Catalina	CSS	JUN	1.0 km	MPC · JPL
438025	2004 CA_{52}	—	January 31, 2004	Socorro	LINEAR	PHO	1.1 km	MPC · JPL
438026	2004 DJ_{6}	—	February 16, 2004	Kitt Peak	Spacewatch	·	850 m	MPC · JPL
438027	2004 EN_{85}	—	February 23, 2004	Socorro	LINEAR	·	790 m	MPC · JPL
438028	2004 EH_{96}	—	March 15, 2004	Kitt Peak	M. W. Buie	plutino	122 km	MPC · JPL
438029	2004 FE_{29}	—	March 27, 2004	Socorro	LINEAR	·	1.7 km	MPC · JPL
438030	2004 FL_{111}	—	March 26, 2004	Socorro	LINEAR	·	710 m	MPC · JPL
438031	2004 FJ_{141}	—	March 18, 2004	Socorro	LINEAR	·	760 m	MPC · JPL
438032	2004 GF_{8}	—	April 12, 2004	Kitt Peak	Spacewatch	·	710 m	MPC · JPL
438033	2004 GY_{48}	—	April 12, 2004	Kitt Peak	Spacewatch	·	1.9 km	MPC · JPL
438034	2004 GH_{79}	—	April 12, 2004	Anderson Mesa	LONEOS	·	1.9 km	MPC · JPL
438035	2004 HT_{3}	—	April 16, 2004	Kitt Peak	Spacewatch	·	2.0 km	MPC · JPL
438036	2004 HS_{23}	—	April 16, 2004	Kitt Peak	Spacewatch	·	2.2 km	MPC · JPL
438037	2004 HC_{29}	—	April 21, 2004	Kitt Peak	Spacewatch	·	3.0 km	MPC · JPL
438038	2004 JJ_{5}	—	April 12, 2004	Kitt Peak	Spacewatch	·	1.1 km	MPC · JPL
438039	2004 JS_{7}	—	May 10, 2004	Kitt Peak	Spacewatch	·	720 m	MPC · JPL
438040	2004 JW_{11}	—	May 13, 2004	Socorro	LINEAR	H	510 m	MPC · JPL
438041	2004 KN_{2}	—	May 16, 2004	Kitt Peak	Spacewatch	·	1.4 km	MPC · JPL
438042	2004 KA_{8}	—	May 19, 2004	Needville	J. Dellinger, P. Garossino	·	800 m	MPC · JPL
438043	2004 LW_{5}	—	June 13, 2004	Kitt Peak	Spacewatch	H	490 m	MPC · JPL
438044	2004 NA_{1}	—	July 7, 2004	Campo Imperatore	CINEOS	·	980 m	MPC · JPL
438045	2004 NV_{7}	—	July 11, 2004	Socorro	LINEAR	H	700 m	MPC · JPL
438046	2004 NG_{31}	—	July 11, 2004	Anderson Mesa	LONEOS	T_{j} (2.99)	4.8 km	MPC · JPL
438047	2004 OO_{10}	—	July 21, 2004	Reedy Creek	J. Broughton	T_{j} (2.98)	4.4 km	MPC · JPL
438048	2004 OQ_{13}	—	July 22, 2004	Mauna Kea	Veillet, C.	·	4.8 km	MPC · JPL
438049	2004 PH_{36}	—	August 9, 2004	Campo Imperatore	CINEOS	·	1.2 km	MPC · JPL
438050	2004 PR_{36}	—	August 9, 2004	Socorro	LINEAR	·	980 m	MPC · JPL
438051	2004 PV_{50}	—	August 8, 2004	Socorro	LINEAR	NYS	1.0 km	MPC · JPL
438052	2004 PV_{54}	—	August 8, 2004	Anderson Mesa	LONEOS	NYS	1.3 km	MPC · JPL
438053	2004 PN_{94}	—	August 10, 2004	Anderson Mesa	LONEOS	PHO	960 m	MPC · JPL
438054	2004 PJ_{97}	—	August 11, 2004	Palomar	NEAT	·	1.3 km	MPC · JPL
438055	2004 PV_{106}	—	August 15, 2004	Campo Imperatore	CINEOS	·	2.4 km	MPC · JPL
438056	2004 QZ_{27}	—	August 22, 2004	Kitt Peak	Spacewatch	V	770 m	MPC · JPL
438057	2004 RY_{2}	—	June 21, 2004	Socorro	LINEAR	·	4.2 km	MPC · JPL
438058	2004 RF_{20}	—	September 7, 2004	Socorro	LINEAR	·	2.8 km	MPC · JPL
438059	2004 RM_{27}	—	September 6, 2004	Palomar	NEAT	·	1.1 km	MPC · JPL
438060	2004 RD_{33}	—	September 7, 2004	Socorro	LINEAR	·	1.4 km	MPC · JPL
438061	2004 RH_{35}	—	September 7, 2004	Socorro	LINEAR	·	1.3 km	MPC · JPL
438062	2004 RK_{50}	—	September 8, 2004	Socorro	LINEAR	MAS	850 m	MPC · JPL
438063	2004 RM_{53}	—	September 8, 2004	Socorro	LINEAR	NYS	1.3 km	MPC · JPL
438064	2004 RB_{58}	—	September 8, 2004	Socorro	LINEAR	NYS	1.3 km	MPC · JPL
438065	2004 RD_{60}	—	September 8, 2004	Socorro	LINEAR	MAS	720 m	MPC · JPL
438066	2004 RM_{68}	—	September 8, 2004	Socorro	LINEAR	·	1.2 km	MPC · JPL
438067	2004 RN_{72}	—	September 8, 2004	Socorro	LINEAR	·	1.1 km	MPC · JPL
438068	2004 RJ_{89}	—	September 8, 2004	Socorro	LINEAR	·	1.4 km	MPC · JPL
438069	2004 RS_{111}	—	September 12, 2004	Socorro	LINEAR	·	4.4 km	MPC · JPL
438070	2004 RN_{113}	—	September 7, 2004	Socorro	LINEAR	·	1.1 km	MPC · JPL
438071	2004 RW_{123}	—	September 7, 2004	Palomar	NEAT	·	1.7 km	MPC · JPL
438072	2004 RP_{145}	—	September 9, 2004	Socorro	LINEAR	NYS	1.3 km	MPC · JPL
438073	2004 RD_{147}	—	September 9, 2004	Socorro	LINEAR	·	1.1 km	MPC · JPL
438074	2004 RD_{207}	—	September 11, 2004	Socorro	LINEAR	·	4.1 km	MPC · JPL
438075	2004 RS_{211}	—	September 11, 2004	Socorro	LINEAR	·	4.1 km	MPC · JPL
438076	2004 RY_{221}	—	September 13, 2004	Socorro	LINEAR	·	1.3 km	MPC · JPL
438077	2004 RE_{248}	—	September 12, 2004	Socorro	LINEAR	·	3.4 km	MPC · JPL
438078	2004 RN_{248}	—	September 12, 2004	Socorro	LINEAR	·	4.6 km	MPC · JPL
438079	2004 RS_{279}	—	September 15, 2004	Kitt Peak	Spacewatch	·	760 m	MPC · JPL
438080	2004 RF_{341}	—	September 11, 2004	Socorro	LINEAR	PHO	1.4 km	MPC · JPL
438081	2004 TP_{60}	—	October 5, 2004	Anderson Mesa	LONEOS	·	1.1 km	MPC · JPL
438082	2004 TB_{61}	—	October 5, 2004	Anderson Mesa	LONEOS	·	1.1 km	MPC · JPL
438083	2004 TF_{120}	—	October 6, 2004	Palomar	NEAT	·	1.6 km	MPC · JPL
438084	2004 TE_{136}	—	September 18, 2004	Socorro	LINEAR	·	4.5 km	MPC · JPL
438085	2004 TA_{142}	—	October 4, 2004	Kitt Peak	Spacewatch	NYS	1.1 km	MPC · JPL
438086	2004 TJ_{174}	—	October 9, 2004	Socorro	LINEAR	·	3.2 km	MPC · JPL
438087	2004 TB_{273}	—	October 9, 2004	Kitt Peak	Spacewatch	·	1.6 km	MPC · JPL
438088	2004 TU_{276}	—	October 9, 2004	Kitt Peak	Spacewatch	·	1.3 km	MPC · JPL
438089	2004 TL_{299}	—	October 8, 2004	Anderson Mesa	LONEOS	·	1.4 km	MPC · JPL
438090	2004 TX_{366}	—	October 15, 2004	Mount Lemmon	Mount Lemmon Survey	·	1.5 km	MPC · JPL
438091	2004 VS_{37}	—	November 4, 2004	Kitt Peak	Spacewatch	MAS	790 m	MPC · JPL
438092	2004 XT	—	December 1, 2004	Catalina	CSS	·	4.7 km	MPC · JPL
438093	2004 XL_{30}	—	December 10, 2004	Campo Imperatore	CINEOS	·	1.6 km	MPC · JPL
438094	2004 XP_{102}	—	December 14, 2004	Kitt Peak	Spacewatch	·	1.4 km	MPC · JPL
438095	2005 BW_{4}	—	December 19, 2004	Mount Lemmon	Mount Lemmon Survey	·	2.3 km	MPC · JPL
438096	2005 CX_{23}	—	February 2, 2005	Kitt Peak	Spacewatch	·	750 m	MPC · JPL
438097	2005 CY_{27}	—	February 3, 2005	Socorro	LINEAR	·	1.3 km	MPC · JPL
438098	2005 CS_{56}	—	February 9, 2005	Gnosca	S. Sposetti	·	1.9 km	MPC · JPL
438099	2005 CH_{65}	—	February 9, 2005	Kitt Peak	Spacewatch	·	2.6 km	MPC · JPL
438100	2005 EZ_{2}	—	January 17, 2005	Kitt Peak	Spacewatch	·	1.9 km	MPC · JPL

== 438101–438200 ==
back to top

Designation			Discovery			Properties		Ref
Permanent	Provisional	Named after	Date	Site	Discoverer(s)	Category	Diam.	Ref
438101	2005 EL_{17}	—	March 3, 2005	Kitt Peak	Spacewatch	·	2.5 km	MPC · JPL
438102	2005 EG_{107}	—	March 4, 2005	Catalina	CSS	·	3.2 km	MPC · JPL
438103	2005 EU_{193}	—	March 11, 2005	Mount Lemmon	Mount Lemmon Survey	·	1.7 km	MPC · JPL
438104	2005 FU_{14}	—	March 18, 2005	Catalina	CSS	·	2.0 km	MPC · JPL
438105	2005 GO_{22}	—	April 5, 2005	Socorro	LINEAR	APO · PHA	630 m	MPC · JPL
438106	2005 GJ_{99}	—	April 7, 2005	Kitt Peak	Spacewatch	·	550 m	MPC · JPL
438107	2005 GY_{110}	—	April 10, 2005	Siding Spring	SSS	APO	660 m	MPC · JPL
438108	2005 GE_{165}	—	April 10, 2005	Catalina	CSS	PHO	870 m	MPC · JPL
438109	2005 JM_{49}	—	May 4, 2005	Kitt Peak	Spacewatch	·	1.8 km	MPC · JPL
438110	2005 JE_{61}	—	May 8, 2005	Kitt Peak	Spacewatch	·	520 m	MPC · JPL
438111	2005 JX_{136}	—	April 18, 2005	Kitt Peak	Spacewatch	·	870 m	MPC · JPL
438112	2005 JL_{161}	—	May 8, 2005	Kitt Peak	Spacewatch	·	670 m	MPC · JPL
438113	2005 LM_{13}	—	June 4, 2005	Kitt Peak	Spacewatch	·	2.3 km	MPC · JPL
438114	2005 MN_{48}	—	June 29, 2005	Kitt Peak	Spacewatch	·	600 m	MPC · JPL
438115	2005 NS_{15}	—	July 2, 2005	Kitt Peak	Spacewatch	·	580 m	MPC · JPL
438116	2005 NX_{44}	—	July 10, 2005	Catalina	CSS	T_{j} (2.79) · APO +1km	1.2 km	MPC · JPL
438117	2005 NL_{46}	—	July 5, 2005	Palomar	NEAT	·	710 m	MPC · JPL
438118	2005 NR_{85}	—	July 3, 2005	Mount Lemmon	Mount Lemmon Survey	·	2.0 km	MPC · JPL
438119	2005 OU_{25}	—	July 31, 2005	Palomar	NEAT	H	550 m	MPC · JPL
438120	2005 QW_{9}	—	August 25, 2005	Campo Imperatore	CINEOS	·	2.0 km	MPC · JPL
438121	2005 QL_{14}	—	August 25, 2005	Palomar	NEAT	·	820 m	MPC · JPL
438122	2005 QM_{27}	—	August 27, 2005	Kitt Peak	Spacewatch	·	2.6 km	MPC · JPL
438123	2005 QT_{59}	—	August 25, 2005	Palomar	NEAT	EOS	2.0 km	MPC · JPL
438124	2005 QL_{67}	—	August 28, 2005	Kitt Peak	Spacewatch	·	2.6 km	MPC · JPL
438125	2005 QS_{79}	—	August 26, 2005	Campo Imperatore	CINEOS	·	540 m	MPC · JPL
438126	2005 QQ_{83}	—	August 29, 2005	Anderson Mesa	LONEOS	H	480 m	MPC · JPL
438127	2005 QU_{114}	—	August 27, 2005	Palomar	NEAT	·	800 m	MPC · JPL
438128	2005 QF_{117}	—	August 28, 2005	Kitt Peak	Spacewatch	·	2.1 km	MPC · JPL
438129	2005 QV_{121}	—	August 28, 2005	Kitt Peak	Spacewatch	·	610 m	MPC · JPL
438130	2005 QC_{138}	—	August 28, 2005	Kitt Peak	Spacewatch	·	2.6 km	MPC · JPL
438131	2005 QU_{155}	—	August 30, 2005	Palomar	NEAT	·	2.1 km	MPC · JPL
438132	2005 QE_{157}	—	August 30, 2005	Palomar	NEAT	·	600 m	MPC · JPL
438133	2005 QB_{181}	—	August 30, 2005	Palomar	NEAT	·	2.8 km	MPC · JPL
438134	2005 RE_{4}	—	September 3, 2005	Bergisch Gladbach	W. Bickel	·	3.1 km	MPC · JPL
438135	2005 RA_{6}	—	September 6, 2005	Anderson Mesa	LONEOS	·	610 m	MPC · JPL
438136	2005 RA_{7}	—	September 6, 2005	Anderson Mesa	LONEOS	·	3.3 km	MPC · JPL
438137	2005 RP_{23}	—	August 16, 2005	Socorro	LINEAR	·	1.3 km	MPC · JPL
438138	2005 RC_{31}	—	September 11, 2005	Kitt Peak	Spacewatch	·	1.9 km	MPC · JPL
438139	2005 RF_{45}	—	September 11, 2005	Socorro	LINEAR	LIX	3.6 km	MPC · JPL
438140	2005 SH_{2}	—	September 23, 2005	Kitt Peak	Spacewatch	·	580 m	MPC · JPL
438141	2005 SL_{20}	—	September 23, 2005	Catalina	CSS	·	950 m	MPC · JPL
438142	2005 SN_{34}	—	September 23, 2005	Kitt Peak	Spacewatch	·	720 m	MPC · JPL
438143	2005 SW_{43}	—	September 24, 2005	Kitt Peak	Spacewatch	·	2.7 km	MPC · JPL
438144	2005 SS_{49}	—	September 24, 2005	Kitt Peak	Spacewatch	NYS	1.1 km	MPC · JPL
438145	2005 SB_{79}	—	September 24, 2005	Kitt Peak	Spacewatch	·	960 m	MPC · JPL
438146	2005 SP_{80}	—	September 24, 2005	Kitt Peak	Spacewatch	·	2.9 km	MPC · JPL
438147	2005 SW_{91}	—	September 24, 2005	Kitt Peak	Spacewatch	·	680 m	MPC · JPL
438148	2005 SB_{101}	—	September 25, 2005	Kitt Peak	Spacewatch	·	580 m	MPC · JPL
438149	2005 ST_{102}	—	September 25, 2005	Kitt Peak	Spacewatch	EOS	1.7 km	MPC · JPL
438150	2005 SV_{108}	—	September 26, 2005	Kitt Peak	Spacewatch	·	2.2 km	MPC · JPL
438151	2005 SW_{138}	—	September 25, 2005	Kitt Peak	Spacewatch	·	1.7 km	MPC · JPL
438152	2005 SC_{142}	—	September 25, 2005	Kitt Peak	Spacewatch	·	2.2 km	MPC · JPL
438153	2005 SN_{143}	—	September 25, 2005	Kitt Peak	Spacewatch	·	970 m	MPC · JPL
438154	2005 SR_{154}	—	September 26, 2005	Kitt Peak	Spacewatch	·	2.2 km	MPC · JPL
438155	2005 SU_{193}	—	September 25, 2005	Catalina	CSS	·	1.4 km	MPC · JPL
438156	2005 SK_{197}	—	September 13, 2005	Kitt Peak	Spacewatch	·	980 m	MPC · JPL
438157	2005 SL_{198}	—	August 30, 2005	Kitt Peak	Spacewatch	·	2.6 km	MPC · JPL
438158	2005 ST_{227}	—	September 30, 2005	Kitt Peak	Spacewatch	·	640 m	MPC · JPL
438159	2005 SJ_{232}	—	September 30, 2005	Mount Lemmon	Mount Lemmon Survey	·	2.7 km	MPC · JPL
438160	2005 SV_{233}	—	September 30, 2005	Mount Lemmon	Mount Lemmon Survey	·	880 m	MPC · JPL
438161	2005 SH_{250}	—	September 23, 2005	Kitt Peak	Spacewatch	·	660 m	MPC · JPL
438162	2005 SH_{255}	—	September 22, 2005	Palomar	NEAT	·	770 m	MPC · JPL
438163	2005 SY_{263}	—	September 23, 2005	Kitt Peak	Spacewatch	MAS	690 m	MPC · JPL
438164	2005 SV_{269}	—	September 29, 2005	Catalina	CSS	·	3.8 km	MPC · JPL
438165	2005 SQ_{280}	—	September 27, 2005	Palomar	NEAT	·	920 m	MPC · JPL
438166	2005 TC_{10}	—	October 2, 2005	Palomar	NEAT	·	3.5 km	MPC · JPL
438167	2005 TM_{16}	—	September 14, 2005	Kitt Peak	Spacewatch	·	2.5 km	MPC · JPL
438168	2005 TW_{21}	—	October 1, 2005	Kitt Peak	Spacewatch	·	520 m	MPC · JPL
438169	2005 TJ_{24}	—	October 1, 2005	Mount Lemmon	Mount Lemmon Survey	·	2.0 km	MPC · JPL
438170	2005 TK_{26}	—	October 1, 2005	Mount Lemmon	Mount Lemmon Survey	·	2.0 km	MPC · JPL
438171	2005 TY_{28}	—	October 2, 2005	Palomar	NEAT	·	4.3 km	MPC · JPL
438172	2005 TP_{34}	—	October 1, 2005	Kitt Peak	Spacewatch	·	2.5 km	MPC · JPL
438173	2005 TU_{38}	—	October 1, 2005	Catalina	CSS	·	3.0 km	MPC · JPL
438174	2005 TL_{71}	—	October 7, 2005	Mount Lemmon	Mount Lemmon Survey	·	2.7 km	MPC · JPL
438175	2005 TX_{77}	—	October 6, 2005	Mount Lemmon	Mount Lemmon Survey	·	1.8 km	MPC · JPL
438176	2005 TA_{92}	—	September 25, 2005	Kitt Peak	Spacewatch	·	2.7 km	MPC · JPL
438177	2005 TV_{126}	—	October 7, 2005	Kitt Peak	Spacewatch	·	3.1 km	MPC · JPL
438178	2005 TQ_{137}	—	October 6, 2005	Kitt Peak	Spacewatch	·	1.0 km	MPC · JPL
438179	2005 TS_{142}	—	October 8, 2005	Kitt Peak	Spacewatch	·	650 m	MPC · JPL
438180	2005 TG_{154}	—	October 8, 2005	Socorro	LINEAR	·	1.8 km	MPC · JPL
438181	2005 TB_{160}	—	October 9, 2005	Kitt Peak	Spacewatch	LIX	3.2 km	MPC · JPL
438182	2005 TL_{172}	—	September 29, 2005	Catalina	CSS	·	3.7 km	MPC · JPL
438183	2005 TR_{193}	—	October 3, 2005	Palomar	NEAT	·	3.9 km	MPC · JPL
438184	2005 TS_{195}	—	October 1, 2005	Mount Lemmon	Mount Lemmon Survey	·	680 m	MPC · JPL
438185	2005 TC_{197}	—	October 12, 2005	Kitt Peak	Spacewatch	·	790 m	MPC · JPL
438186	2005 UE_{10}	—	October 21, 2005	Palomar	NEAT	·	3.4 km	MPC · JPL
438187	2005 UT_{13}	—	October 11, 2005	Kitt Peak	Spacewatch	EOS	1.7 km	MPC · JPL
438188	2005 UK_{14}	—	September 30, 2005	Mount Lemmon	Mount Lemmon Survey	·	2.6 km	MPC · JPL
438189	2005 UB_{16}	—	October 22, 2005	Kitt Peak	Spacewatch	THM	2.0 km	MPC · JPL
438190	2005 UC_{25}	—	October 23, 2005	Kitt Peak	Spacewatch	·	3.1 km	MPC · JPL
438191	2005 UX_{34}	—	October 24, 2005	Kitt Peak	Spacewatch	THM	2.2 km	MPC · JPL
438192	2005 UF_{43}	—	October 22, 2005	Kitt Peak	Spacewatch	·	2.0 km	MPC · JPL
438193	2005 UW_{45}	—	September 29, 2005	Mount Lemmon	Mount Lemmon Survey	·	2.5 km	MPC · JPL
438194	2005 UR_{48}	—	October 22, 2005	Kitt Peak	Spacewatch	HYG	2.4 km	MPC · JPL
438195	2005 UT_{52}	—	September 25, 2005	Kitt Peak	Spacewatch	·	2.8 km	MPC · JPL
438196	2005 US_{57}	—	October 22, 2005	Catalina	CSS	H	370 m	MPC · JPL
438197	2005 UL_{60}	—	October 25, 2005	Anderson Mesa	LONEOS	·	2.5 km	MPC · JPL
438198	2005 UO_{74}	—	October 23, 2005	Palomar	NEAT	·	2.7 km	MPC · JPL
438199	2005 UB_{81}	—	October 5, 2005	Kitt Peak	Spacewatch	·	1.9 km	MPC · JPL
438200	2005 UM_{85}	—	October 22, 2005	Kitt Peak	Spacewatch	·	2.7 km	MPC · JPL

== 438201–438300 ==
back to top

Designation			Discovery			Properties		Ref
Permanent	Provisional	Named after	Date	Site	Discoverer(s)	Category	Diam.	Ref
438201	2005 UG_{128}	—	October 24, 2005	Kitt Peak	Spacewatch	·	3.0 km	MPC · JPL
438202	2005 UE_{129}	—	October 24, 2005	Kitt Peak	Spacewatch	·	1.1 km	MPC · JPL
438203	2005 UZ_{131}	—	October 24, 2005	Palomar	NEAT	·	2.2 km	MPC · JPL
438204	2005 UN_{143}	—	October 25, 2005	Kitt Peak	Spacewatch	·	4.6 km	MPC · JPL
438205	2005 UO_{158}	—	October 30, 2005	Goodricke-Pigott	R. A. Tucker	·	2.9 km	MPC · JPL
438206	2005 UA_{164}	—	October 24, 2005	Kitt Peak	Spacewatch	·	1.2 km	MPC · JPL
438207	2005 UB_{186}	—	October 25, 2005	Mount Lemmon	Mount Lemmon Survey	HYG	2.6 km	MPC · JPL
438208	2005 UH_{205}	—	October 1, 2005	Mount Lemmon	Mount Lemmon Survey	·	700 m	MPC · JPL
438209	2005 UZ_{213}	—	October 23, 2005	Palomar	NEAT	·	2.6 km	MPC · JPL
438210	2005 UL_{228}	—	October 25, 2005	Kitt Peak	Spacewatch	THM	2.0 km	MPC · JPL
438211	2005 UT_{235}	—	October 25, 2005	Kitt Peak	Spacewatch	·	2.4 km	MPC · JPL
438212	2005 UV_{236}	—	October 25, 2005	Kitt Peak	Spacewatch	·	1.1 km	MPC · JPL
438213	2005 UP_{241}	—	October 25, 2005	Kitt Peak	Spacewatch	·	760 m	MPC · JPL
438214	2005 UR_{242}	—	October 25, 2005	Kitt Peak	Spacewatch	·	3.8 km	MPC · JPL
438215	2005 UY_{267}	—	October 27, 2005	Mount Lemmon	Mount Lemmon Survey	·	3.4 km	MPC · JPL
438216	2005 UD_{282}	—	October 25, 2005	Mount Lemmon	Mount Lemmon Survey	·	680 m	MPC · JPL
438217	2005 UZ_{291}	—	October 26, 2005	Kitt Peak	Spacewatch	·	1.2 km	MPC · JPL
438218	2005 UJ_{309}	—	October 1, 2005	Mount Lemmon	Mount Lemmon Survey	·	650 m	MPC · JPL
438219	2005 UQ_{335}	—	October 30, 2005	Kitt Peak	Spacewatch	·	2.1 km	MPC · JPL
438220	2005 UH_{342}	—	October 31, 2005	Mount Lemmon	Mount Lemmon Survey	·	1.2 km	MPC · JPL
438221	2005 UV_{346}	—	October 30, 2005	Kitt Peak	Spacewatch	NYS	800 m	MPC · JPL
438222	2005 UN_{350}	—	October 28, 2005	Kitt Peak	Spacewatch	AEG	3.4 km	MPC · JPL
438223	2005 UK_{396}	—	October 26, 2005	Palomar	NEAT	·	3.4 km	MPC · JPL
438224	2005 UV_{397}	—	October 29, 2005	Catalina	CSS	·	3.7 km	MPC · JPL
438225	2005 UT_{423}	—	October 28, 2005	Kitt Peak	Spacewatch	THM	3.8 km	MPC · JPL
438226	2005 UE_{462}	—	October 30, 2005	Kitt Peak	Spacewatch	V	500 m	MPC · JPL
438227	2005 UM_{463}	—	October 30, 2005	Kitt Peak	Spacewatch	·	740 m	MPC · JPL
438228	2005 UH_{474}	—	October 31, 2005	Mount Lemmon	Mount Lemmon Survey	NYS	1.0 km	MPC · JPL
438229	2005 UK_{480}	—	October 22, 2005	Palomar	NEAT	·	4.8 km	MPC · JPL
438230	2005 UC_{482}	—	October 10, 2005	Anderson Mesa	LONEOS	·	1.3 km	MPC · JPL
438231	2005 UB_{493}	—	October 25, 2005	Catalina	CSS	·	4.0 km	MPC · JPL
438232	2005 UY_{510}	—	October 26, 2005	Kitt Peak	Spacewatch	·	1.2 km	MPC · JPL
438233	2005 UH_{518}	—	October 25, 2005	Apache Point	A. C. Becker	·	2.8 km	MPC · JPL
438234	2005 UN_{521}	—	October 6, 2005	Catalina	CSS	·	780 m	MPC · JPL
438235	2005 UB_{524}	—	October 27, 2005	Apache Point	A. C. Becker	·	2.5 km	MPC · JPL
438236	2005 VS_{1}	—	October 23, 2005	Catalina	CSS	H	540 m	MPC · JPL
438237	2005 VJ_{17}	—	November 4, 2005	Kitt Peak	Spacewatch	·	710 m	MPC · JPL
438238	2005 VW_{29}	—	November 4, 2005	Kitt Peak	Spacewatch	·	720 m	MPC · JPL
438239	2005 VN_{65}	—	October 25, 2005	Kitt Peak	Spacewatch	V	550 m	MPC · JPL
438240	2005 VT_{65}	—	October 25, 2005	Kitt Peak	Spacewatch	·	3.0 km	MPC · JPL
438241	2005 VK_{78}	—	November 6, 2005	Kitt Peak	Spacewatch	·	2.8 km	MPC · JPL
438242	2005 VO_{79}	—	November 3, 2005	Socorro	LINEAR	·	5.2 km	MPC · JPL
438243	2005 VA_{90}	—	November 6, 2005	Kitt Peak	Spacewatch	·	3.3 km	MPC · JPL
438244	2005 VX_{97}	—	November 5, 2005	Catalina	CSS	·	3.5 km	MPC · JPL
438245	2005 WU_{3}	—	November 22, 2005	Socorro	LINEAR	·	4.2 km	MPC · JPL
438246	2005 WZ_{19}	—	November 21, 2005	Kitt Peak	Spacewatch	·	3.1 km	MPC · JPL
438247	2005 WA_{33}	—	November 21, 2005	Kitt Peak	Spacewatch	·	1.1 km	MPC · JPL
438248	2005 WG_{37}	—	November 22, 2005	Kitt Peak	Spacewatch	THM	2.2 km	MPC · JPL
438249	2005 WA_{40}	—	November 25, 2005	Mount Lemmon	Mount Lemmon Survey	·	1.0 km	MPC · JPL
438250	2005 WG_{56}	—	November 26, 2005	Catalina	CSS	V	650 m	MPC · JPL
438251	2005 WN_{58}	—	November 25, 2005	Mount Lemmon	Mount Lemmon Survey	·	3.5 km	MPC · JPL
438252	2005 WV_{63}	—	October 30, 2005	Catalina	CSS	·	4.7 km	MPC · JPL
438253	2005 WP_{65}	—	November 26, 2005	Mount Lemmon	Mount Lemmon Survey	·	930 m	MPC · JPL
438254	2005 WN_{98}	—	September 25, 2005	Kitt Peak	Spacewatch	·	690 m	MPC · JPL
438255	2005 WY_{114}	—	November 28, 2005	Mount Lemmon	Mount Lemmon Survey	·	5.2 km	MPC · JPL
438256	2005 WT_{115}	—	November 30, 2005	Anderson Mesa	LONEOS	·	850 m	MPC · JPL
438257	2005 WO_{118}	—	November 28, 2005	Catalina	CSS	PHO	1.4 km	MPC · JPL
438258	2005 WO_{136}	—	November 26, 2005	Mount Lemmon	Mount Lemmon Survey	·	2.2 km	MPC · JPL
438259	2005 WD_{145}	—	November 25, 2005	Kitt Peak	Spacewatch	·	3.6 km	MPC · JPL
438260	2005 WR_{154}	—	November 29, 2005	Kitt Peak	Spacewatch	·	870 m	MPC · JPL
438261	2005 WB_{163}	—	November 29, 2005	Kitt Peak	Spacewatch	H	630 m	MPC · JPL
438262	2005 WM_{211}	—	November 26, 2005	Mount Lemmon	Mount Lemmon Survey	·	1.4 km	MPC · JPL
438263	2005 XO_{3}	—	December 1, 2005	Palomar	NEAT	·	5.4 km	MPC · JPL
438264	2005 XZ_{13}	—	December 1, 2005	Socorro	LINEAR	URS	5.4 km	MPC · JPL
438265	2005 XE_{25}	—	December 3, 2005	Kitt Peak	Spacewatch	·	4.2 km	MPC · JPL
438266	2005 XG_{55}	—	December 5, 2005	Socorro	LINEAR	·	840 m	MPC · JPL
438267	2005 XC_{75}	—	December 2, 2005	Kitt Peak	Spacewatch	·	3.0 km	MPC · JPL
438268	2005 XX_{108}	—	December 1, 2005	Kitt Peak	M. W. Buie	THM	2.3 km	MPC · JPL
438269	2005 XD_{117}	—	December 7, 2005	Kitt Peak	Spacewatch	·	1.2 km	MPC · JPL
438270	2005 YZ	—	December 10, 2005	Catalina	CSS	·	1.4 km	MPC · JPL
438271	2005 YL_{8}	—	December 23, 2005	Palomar	NEAT	·	4.0 km	MPC · JPL
438272	2005 YV_{23}	—	December 24, 2005	Kitt Peak	Spacewatch	·	2.4 km	MPC · JPL
438273	2005 YC_{25}	—	December 24, 2005	Kitt Peak	Spacewatch	·	2.9 km	MPC · JPL
438274	2005 YE_{29}	—	December 24, 2005	Kitt Peak	Spacewatch	MAS	540 m	MPC · JPL
438275	2005 YC_{31}	—	December 22, 2005	Kitt Peak	Spacewatch	·	1.4 km	MPC · JPL
438276	2005 YR_{75}	—	December 24, 2005	Kitt Peak	Spacewatch	·	1.0 km	MPC · JPL
438277	2005 YC_{85}	—	December 8, 2005	Kitt Peak	Spacewatch	·	1.3 km	MPC · JPL
438278	2005 YP_{98}	—	December 26, 2005	Kitt Peak	Spacewatch	·	1.3 km	MPC · JPL
438279	2005 YJ_{102}	—	December 25, 2005	Kitt Peak	Spacewatch	·	3.5 km	MPC · JPL
438280	2005 YO_{111}	—	December 10, 2005	Kitt Peak	Spacewatch	H	510 m	MPC · JPL
438281	2005 YO_{130}	—	December 25, 2005	Kitt Peak	Spacewatch	·	960 m	MPC · JPL
438282	2005 YR_{209}	—	December 24, 2005	Socorro	LINEAR	·	3.2 km	MPC · JPL
438283	2005 YO_{212}	—	December 29, 2005	Socorro	LINEAR	·	2.5 km	MPC · JPL
438284	2006 AD_{6}	—	January 2, 2006	Catalina	CSS	·	2.0 km	MPC · JPL
438285	2006 AR_{32}	—	January 5, 2006	Kitt Peak	Spacewatch	·	1.1 km	MPC · JPL
438286	2006 AY_{34}	—	January 4, 2006	Kitt Peak	Spacewatch	·	1.3 km	MPC · JPL
438287	2006 AS_{59}	—	January 5, 2006	Kitt Peak	Spacewatch	(1298)	2.9 km	MPC · JPL
438288	2006 AE_{67}	—	January 9, 2006	Kitt Peak	Spacewatch	·	1.2 km	MPC · JPL
438289	2006 AG_{79}	—	January 6, 2006	Kitt Peak	Spacewatch	·	4.0 km	MPC · JPL
438290	2006 AP_{86}	—	January 3, 2006	Socorro	LINEAR	T_{j} (2.98)	4.9 km	MPC · JPL
438291	2006 AO_{93}	—	January 7, 2006	Mount Lemmon	Mount Lemmon Survey	(5)	1.0 km	MPC · JPL
438292	2006 BS_{22}	—	January 22, 2006	Mount Lemmon	Mount Lemmon Survey	·	1.1 km	MPC · JPL
438293	2006 BE_{33}	—	January 21, 2006	Kitt Peak	Spacewatch	·	2.0 km	MPC · JPL
438294	2006 BX_{60}	—	January 20, 2006	Catalina	CSS	·	1.2 km	MPC · JPL
438295	2006 BH_{232}	—	January 31, 2006	Kitt Peak	Spacewatch	CYB	3.8 km	MPC · JPL
438296	2006 BG_{277}	—	January 30, 2006	Kitt Peak	Spacewatch	·	1.4 km	MPC · JPL
438297	2006 CV_{38}	—	February 2, 2006	Kitt Peak	Spacewatch	·	1.7 km	MPC · JPL
438298	2006 CM_{67}	—	February 6, 2006	Mount Lemmon	Mount Lemmon Survey	·	1.0 km	MPC · JPL
438299	2006 DO_{36}	—	February 20, 2006	Mount Lemmon	Mount Lemmon Survey	·	1.8 km	MPC · JPL
438300	2006 DS_{37}	—	February 20, 2006	Mount Lemmon	Mount Lemmon Survey	·	1.2 km	MPC · JPL

== 438301–438400 ==
back to top

Designation			Discovery			Properties		Ref
Permanent	Provisional	Named after	Date	Site	Discoverer(s)	Category	Diam.	Ref
438301	2006 DB_{50}	—	February 22, 2006	Anderson Mesa	LONEOS	ADE	3.0 km	MPC · JPL
438302	2006 DP_{139}	—	February 25, 2006	Mount Lemmon	Mount Lemmon Survey	·	1.0 km	MPC · JPL
438303	2006 DV_{146}	—	February 25, 2006	Kitt Peak	Spacewatch	·	1.5 km	MPC · JPL
438304	2006 DZ_{147}	—	February 25, 2006	Kitt Peak	Spacewatch	·	1.3 km	MPC · JPL
438305	2006 DY_{207}	—	February 25, 2006	Kitt Peak	Spacewatch	·	1.7 km	MPC · JPL
438306	2006 EF_{21}	—	March 3, 2006	Kitt Peak	Spacewatch	·	1.0 km	MPC · JPL
438307	2006 FG_{11}	—	March 23, 2006	Kitt Peak	Spacewatch	·	1.2 km	MPC · JPL
438308	2006 HC_{11}	—	April 19, 2006	Kitt Peak	Spacewatch	·	1.9 km	MPC · JPL
438309	2006 HS_{24}	—	April 20, 2006	Kitt Peak	Spacewatch	·	1.7 km	MPC · JPL
438310	2006 HM_{73}	—	April 25, 2006	Kitt Peak	Spacewatch	·	1.7 km	MPC · JPL
438311	2006 HN_{80}	—	April 26, 2006	Kitt Peak	Spacewatch	·	1.9 km	MPC · JPL
438312	2006 HW_{102}	—	April 30, 2006	Kitt Peak	Spacewatch	·	1.2 km	MPC · JPL
438313	2006 HX_{109}	—	April 20, 2006	Siding Spring	SSS	·	2.1 km	MPC · JPL
438314	2006 HD_{117}	—	April 26, 2006	Mount Lemmon	Mount Lemmon Survey	·	1.7 km	MPC · JPL
438315	2006 HY_{143}	—	April 27, 2006	Cerro Tololo	M. W. Buie	·	1.2 km	MPC · JPL
438316	2006 HX_{152}	—	April 30, 2006	Kitt Peak	Spacewatch	·	1.2 km	MPC · JPL
438317	2006 JX	—	May 4, 2006	Siding Spring	SSS	AMO	370 m	MPC · JPL
438318	2006 JV_{3}	—	May 2, 2006	Mount Lemmon	Mount Lemmon Survey	·	1.6 km	MPC · JPL
438319	2006 JX_{48}	—	May 14, 2006	Palomar	NEAT	·	1.5 km	MPC · JPL
438320	2006 KC_{5}	—	May 19, 2006	Mount Lemmon	Mount Lemmon Survey	·	1.7 km	MPC · JPL
438321	2006 KU_{8}	—	May 8, 2006	Siding Spring	SSS	JUN	1.2 km	MPC · JPL
438322	2006 KB_{15}	—	May 9, 2006	Mount Lemmon	Mount Lemmon Survey	·	1.7 km	MPC · JPL
438323	2006 KO_{27}	—	May 20, 2006	Kitt Peak	Spacewatch	·	1.3 km	MPC · JPL
438324	2006 KE_{31}	—	April 30, 2006	Kitt Peak	Spacewatch	·	1.9 km	MPC · JPL
438325	2006 KA_{44}	—	May 21, 2006	Kitt Peak	Spacewatch	JUN	930 m	MPC · JPL
438326	2006 KN_{50}	—	May 21, 2006	Kitt Peak	Spacewatch	·	1.4 km	MPC · JPL
438327	2006 KF_{52}	—	May 21, 2006	Kitt Peak	Spacewatch	·	1.2 km	MPC · JPL
438328	2006 KP_{53}	—	May 21, 2006	Kitt Peak	Spacewatch	·	1.6 km	MPC · JPL
438329	2006 KL_{65}	—	May 24, 2006	Kitt Peak	Spacewatch	·	2.1 km	MPC · JPL
438330	2006 KN_{68}	—	May 20, 2006	Mount Lemmon	Mount Lemmon Survey	·	1.5 km	MPC · JPL
438331	2006 KC_{69}	—	May 21, 2006	Palomar	NEAT	·	1.7 km	MPC · JPL
438332	2006 KQ_{103}	—	May 30, 2006	Mount Nyukasa	Japan Aerospace Exploration Agency	·	2.1 km	MPC · JPL
438333	2006 KZ_{119}	—	May 9, 2006	Mount Lemmon	Mount Lemmon Survey	·	1.6 km	MPC · JPL
438334	2006 KD_{139}	—	May 25, 2006	Mauna Kea	P. A. Wiegert	·	2.3 km	MPC · JPL
438335	2006 MC_{6}	—	June 19, 2006	Kitt Peak	Spacewatch	·	1.5 km	MPC · JPL
438336	2006 PH_{10}	—	May 26, 2006	Mount Lemmon	Mount Lemmon Survey	·	1.6 km	MPC · JPL
438337	2006 PH_{25}	—	August 13, 2006	Palomar	NEAT	·	2.6 km	MPC · JPL
438338	2006 QX_{71}	—	August 21, 2006	Kitt Peak	Spacewatch	KOR	1.5 km	MPC · JPL
438339	2006 QU_{112}	—	August 24, 2006	Socorro	LINEAR	DOR	2.2 km	MPC · JPL
438340	2006 QV_{118}	—	August 27, 2006	Lulin	Lin, H.-C., Q. Ye	·	2.2 km	MPC · JPL
438341	2006 QX_{123}	—	August 29, 2006	Anderson Mesa	LONEOS	·	2.0 km	MPC · JPL
438342	2006 QQ_{169}	—	August 27, 2006	Anderson Mesa	LONEOS	·	730 m	MPC · JPL
438343	2006 RO	—	May 25, 2006	Mount Lemmon	Mount Lemmon Survey	·	2.1 km	MPC · JPL
438344	2006 RJ_{24}	—	September 14, 2006	Kitt Peak	Spacewatch	·	1.9 km	MPC · JPL
438345	2006 RO_{27}	—	July 21, 2006	Mount Lemmon	Mount Lemmon Survey	·	710 m	MPC · JPL
438346	2006 RU_{66}	—	September 14, 2006	Kitt Peak	Spacewatch	·	2.1 km	MPC · JPL
438347	2006 RK_{94}	—	September 15, 2006	Kitt Peak	Spacewatch	·	830 m	MPC · JPL
438348	2006 RK_{110}	—	September 14, 2006	Mauna Kea	Masiero, J.	·	1.6 km	MPC · JPL
438349	2006 RE_{113}	—	September 14, 2006	Mauna Kea	Masiero, J.	THM	1.9 km	MPC · JPL
438350	2006 SF_{9}	—	September 18, 2006	Kitt Peak	Spacewatch	·	2.9 km	MPC · JPL
438351	2006 SZ_{26}	—	September 16, 2006	Catalina	CSS	·	2.4 km	MPC · JPL
438352	2006 SW_{36}	—	September 17, 2006	Kitt Peak	Spacewatch	·	570 m	MPC · JPL
438353	2006 SC_{52}	—	September 18, 2006	Anderson Mesa	LONEOS	·	2.2 km	MPC · JPL
438354	2006 SF_{56}	—	August 28, 2006	Anderson Mesa	LONEOS	·	2.4 km	MPC · JPL
438355	2006 SO_{159}	—	September 23, 2006	Kitt Peak	Spacewatch	·	660 m	MPC · JPL
438356	2006 SX_{159}	—	September 23, 2006	Kitt Peak	Spacewatch	·	2.3 km	MPC · JPL
438357	2006 SH_{212}	—	September 26, 2006	Kitt Peak	Spacewatch	·	2.5 km	MPC · JPL
438358	2006 SJ_{254}	—	September 18, 2006	Kitt Peak	Spacewatch	·	1.8 km	MPC · JPL
438359	2006 SR_{254}	—	September 18, 2006	Kitt Peak	Spacewatch	·	2.0 km	MPC · JPL
438360	2006 SS_{259}	—	September 26, 2006	Kitt Peak	Spacewatch	EOS	1.5 km	MPC · JPL
438361	2006 SO_{271}	—	September 27, 2006	Mount Lemmon	Mount Lemmon Survey	·	1.4 km	MPC · JPL
438362	2006 SB_{273}	—	September 27, 2006	Mount Lemmon	Mount Lemmon Survey	·	2.7 km	MPC · JPL
438363	2006 SU_{314}	—	September 27, 2006	Kitt Peak	Spacewatch	·	3.3 km	MPC · JPL
438364	2006 SS_{316}	—	September 17, 2006	Kitt Peak	Spacewatch	·	2.3 km	MPC · JPL
438365	2006 SJ_{317}	—	September 17, 2006	Kitt Peak	Spacewatch	KOR	1.3 km	MPC · JPL
438366	2006 SL_{321}	—	September 17, 2006	Kitt Peak	Spacewatch	·	2.0 km	MPC · JPL
438367	2006 SW_{323}	—	September 27, 2006	Kitt Peak	Spacewatch	EOS	1.8 km	MPC · JPL
438368	2006 SM_{346}	—	September 28, 2006	Kitt Peak	Spacewatch	·	2.5 km	MPC · JPL
438369	2006 SR_{378}	—	September 18, 2006	Apache Point	A. C. Becker	EOS	1.4 km	MPC · JPL
438370	2006 SY_{397}	—	September 19, 2006	Catalina	CSS	·	2.0 km	MPC · JPL
438371	2006 TT_{5}	—	October 2, 2006	Mount Lemmon	Mount Lemmon Survey	·	2.0 km	MPC · JPL
438372	2006 TW_{14}	—	September 19, 2006	Kitt Peak	Spacewatch	·	2.1 km	MPC · JPL
438373	2006 TF_{32}	—	September 26, 2006	Mount Lemmon	Mount Lemmon Survey	·	1.6 km	MPC · JPL
438374	2006 TF_{43}	—	October 12, 2006	Kitt Peak	Spacewatch	·	2.6 km	MPC · JPL
438375	2006 TF_{46}	—	October 12, 2006	Kitt Peak	Spacewatch	·	1.8 km	MPC · JPL
438376	2006 TZ_{59}	—	October 13, 2006	Kitt Peak	Spacewatch	·	2.6 km	MPC · JPL
438377	2006 TZ_{80}	—	October 13, 2006	Kitt Peak	Spacewatch	·	560 m	MPC · JPL
438378	2006 TK_{90}	—	October 13, 2006	Kitt Peak	Spacewatch	·	2.5 km	MPC · JPL
438379	2006 TH_{98}	—	October 15, 2006	Kitt Peak	Spacewatch	·	1.7 km	MPC · JPL
438380	2006 TV_{99}	—	October 15, 2006	Kitt Peak	Spacewatch	·	2.2 km	MPC · JPL
438381	2006 TH_{114}	—	October 1, 2006	Apache Point	A. C. Becker	EOS	1.7 km	MPC · JPL
438382	2006 TV_{123}	—	October 2, 2006	Mount Lemmon	Mount Lemmon Survey	·	2.5 km	MPC · JPL
438383	2006 TF_{124}	—	October 2, 2006	Mount Lemmon	Mount Lemmon Survey	·	3.4 km	MPC · JPL
438384	2006 TZ_{124}	—	October 4, 2006	Mount Lemmon	Mount Lemmon Survey	·	3.4 km	MPC · JPL
438385	2006 UV_{6}	—	October 16, 2006	Catalina	CSS	·	3.0 km	MPC · JPL
438386	2006 UL_{12}	—	March 29, 2004	Kitt Peak	Spacewatch	·	1.8 km	MPC · JPL
438387	2006 UF_{20}	—	October 3, 2006	Kitt Peak	Spacewatch	EOS	1.5 km	MPC · JPL
438388	2006 UA_{33}	—	September 30, 2006	Mount Lemmon	Mount Lemmon Survey	·	2.9 km	MPC · JPL
438389	2006 UB_{34}	—	October 16, 2006	Kitt Peak	Spacewatch	·	2.0 km	MPC · JPL
438390	2006 UN_{36}	—	September 27, 2006	Mount Lemmon	Mount Lemmon Survey	VER	2.7 km	MPC · JPL
438391	2006 UH_{38}	—	September 25, 2006	Mount Lemmon	Mount Lemmon Survey	·	1.8 km	MPC · JPL
438392	2006 UF_{48}	—	October 17, 2006	Kitt Peak	Spacewatch	EOS	2.3 km	MPC · JPL
438393	2006 UK_{64}	—	October 23, 2006	Kitami	K. Endate	·	2.4 km	MPC · JPL
438394	2006 US_{78}	—	September 26, 2006	Kitt Peak	Spacewatch	·	1.7 km	MPC · JPL
438395	2006 UX_{82}	—	October 4, 2006	Mount Lemmon	Mount Lemmon Survey	·	2.1 km	MPC · JPL
438396	2006 UO_{83}	—	October 17, 2006	Mount Lemmon	Mount Lemmon Survey	·	2.0 km	MPC · JPL
438397	2006 UT_{94}	—	October 3, 2006	Mount Lemmon	Mount Lemmon Survey	·	1.5 km	MPC · JPL
438398	2006 UH_{131}	—	September 27, 2006	Mount Lemmon	Mount Lemmon Survey	·	2.3 km	MPC · JPL
438399	2006 UE_{143}	—	October 19, 2006	Palomar	NEAT	·	1.8 km	MPC · JPL
438400	2006 UK_{151}	—	October 2, 2006	Mount Lemmon	Mount Lemmon Survey	·	2.3 km	MPC · JPL

== 438401–438500 ==
back to top

Designation			Discovery			Properties		Ref
Permanent	Provisional	Named after	Date	Site	Discoverer(s)	Category	Diam.	Ref
438401	2006 UE_{189}	—	September 28, 2006	Catalina	CSS	·	3.9 km	MPC · JPL
438402	2006 UU_{200}	—	October 2, 2006	Mount Lemmon	Mount Lemmon Survey	·	3.1 km	MPC · JPL
438403	2006 UC_{210}	—	October 23, 2006	Kitt Peak	Spacewatch	·	3.4 km	MPC · JPL
438404	2006 UW_{212}	—	October 23, 2006	Kitt Peak	Spacewatch	·	3.1 km	MPC · JPL
438405	2006 UY_{254}	—	October 16, 2006	Kitt Peak	Spacewatch	·	2.4 km	MPC · JPL
438406	2006 UZ_{262}	—	October 29, 2006	Mount Lemmon	Mount Lemmon Survey	·	600 m	MPC · JPL
438407	2006 UV_{332}	—	October 21, 2006	Apache Point	A. C. Becker	EOS	1.6 km	MPC · JPL
438408	2006 UH_{338}	—	October 27, 2006	Kitt Peak	Spacewatch	·	3.3 km	MPC · JPL
438409	2006 VT_{17}	—	October 4, 2006	Mount Lemmon	Mount Lemmon Survey	·	2.2 km	MPC · JPL
438410	2006 VK_{19}	—	October 4, 2006	Mount Lemmon	Mount Lemmon Survey	·	3.1 km	MPC · JPL
438411	2006 VE_{23}	—	October 17, 2006	Mount Lemmon	Mount Lemmon Survey	·	3.6 km	MPC · JPL
438412	2006 VX_{37}	—	October 19, 2006	Catalina	CSS	·	3.7 km	MPC · JPL
438413	2006 VF_{47}	—	September 27, 2006	Mount Lemmon	Mount Lemmon Survey	·	2.5 km	MPC · JPL
438414	2006 VN_{47}	—	November 9, 2006	Kitt Peak	Spacewatch	EOS	1.8 km	MPC · JPL
438415	2006 VZ_{48}	—	November 10, 2006	Kitt Peak	Spacewatch	·	640 m	MPC · JPL
438416	2006 VZ_{52}	—	November 11, 2006	Kitt Peak	Spacewatch	·	3.2 km	MPC · JPL
438417	2006 VT_{55}	—	November 11, 2006	Kitt Peak	Spacewatch	·	600 m	MPC · JPL
438418	2006 VC_{66}	—	October 31, 2006	Mount Lemmon	Mount Lemmon Survey	·	2.3 km	MPC · JPL
438419	2006 VT_{67}	—	November 11, 2006	Kitt Peak	Spacewatch	·	4.0 km	MPC · JPL
438420	2006 VU_{77}	—	November 12, 2006	Mount Lemmon	Mount Lemmon Survey	·	780 m	MPC · JPL
438421	2006 VU_{78}	—	November 20, 2001	Socorro	LINEAR	·	2.0 km	MPC · JPL
438422	2006 VW_{87}	—	October 23, 2006	Kitt Peak	Spacewatch	·	2.0 km	MPC · JPL
438423	2006 VZ_{94}	—	November 14, 2006	La Sagra	OAM	·	3.6 km	MPC · JPL
438424	2006 VD_{100}	—	October 23, 2006	Mount Lemmon	Mount Lemmon Survey	·	2.7 km	MPC · JPL
438425	2006 VK_{108}	—	November 13, 2006	Kitt Peak	Spacewatch	·	2.7 km	MPC · JPL
438426	2006 VB_{135}	—	October 20, 2006	Mount Lemmon	Mount Lemmon Survey	·	3.3 km	MPC · JPL
438427	2006 VF_{137}	—	October 19, 2006	Mount Lemmon	Mount Lemmon Survey	EOS	1.8 km	MPC · JPL
438428	2006 VR_{169}	—	November 1, 2006	Mount Lemmon	Mount Lemmon Survey	·	6.6 km	MPC · JPL
438429	2006 WN_{1}	—	November 17, 2006	Kitt Peak	Spacewatch	AMO	600 m	MPC · JPL
438430	2006 WL_{3}	—	November 19, 2006	Mount Lemmon	Mount Lemmon Survey	AMO	340 m	MPC · JPL
438431	2006 WW_{3}	—	November 19, 2006	Mount Lemmon	Mount Lemmon Survey	·	4.6 km	MPC · JPL
438432	2006 WO_{27}	—	November 20, 2006	Calvin-Rehoboth	L. A. Molnar	·	530 m	MPC · JPL
438433	2006 WU_{55}	—	November 16, 2006	Mount Lemmon	Mount Lemmon Survey	·	1.2 km	MPC · JPL
438434	2006 WH_{69}	—	November 17, 2006	Kitt Peak	Spacewatch	PHO	1.1 km	MPC · JPL
438435	2006 WP_{71}	—	September 27, 2006	Mount Lemmon	Mount Lemmon Survey	·	760 m	MPC · JPL
438436	2006 WC_{97}	—	November 19, 2006	Kitt Peak	Spacewatch	·	2.8 km	MPC · JPL
438437	2006 WS_{98}	—	November 19, 2006	Kitt Peak	Spacewatch	·	2.6 km	MPC · JPL
438438	2006 WD_{115}	—	November 20, 2006	Kitt Peak	Spacewatch	·	2.4 km	MPC · JPL
438439	2006 WD_{131}	—	November 20, 2006	Siding Spring	SSS	·	3.5 km	MPC · JPL
438440	2006 WS_{141}	—	September 28, 2006	Mount Lemmon	Mount Lemmon Survey	·	2.7 km	MPC · JPL
438441	2006 WX_{160}	—	November 22, 2006	Mount Lemmon	Mount Lemmon Survey	·	3.0 km	MPC · JPL
438442	2006 WC_{169}	—	November 23, 2006	Catalina	CSS	·	680 m	MPC · JPL
438443	2006 WJ_{170}	—	October 31, 2006	Mount Lemmon	Mount Lemmon Survey	·	2.9 km	MPC · JPL
438444	2006 WC_{174}	—	November 19, 2006	Kitt Peak	Spacewatch	·	710 m	MPC · JPL
438445	2006 WF_{188}	—	November 16, 2006	Kitt Peak	Spacewatch	·	3.3 km	MPC · JPL
438446	2006 XD_{22}	—	November 10, 2006	Kitt Peak	Spacewatch	·	3.2 km	MPC · JPL
438447	2006 XZ_{43}	—	November 28, 2006	Socorro	LINEAR	PHO	1.4 km	MPC · JPL
438448	2006 XL_{52}	—	December 14, 2006	Socorro	LINEAR	·	760 m	MPC · JPL
438449	2006 YB_{2}	—	December 17, 2006	7300	W. K. Y. Yeung	·	3.0 km	MPC · JPL
438450	2006 YV_{6}	—	December 20, 2006	Palomar	NEAT	·	760 m	MPC · JPL
438451	2006 YV_{8}	—	November 15, 2006	Mount Lemmon	Mount Lemmon Survey	·	1.2 km	MPC · JPL
438452	2007 AS_{12}	—	January 15, 2007	Anderson Mesa	LONEOS	AMO	500 m	MPC · JPL
438453	2007 AZ_{22}	—	December 16, 2006	Mount Lemmon	Mount Lemmon Survey	·	690 m	MPC · JPL
438454	2007 BT_{32}	—	January 9, 2007	Mount Lemmon	Mount Lemmon Survey	THM	2.2 km	MPC · JPL
438455	2007 BE_{33}	—	November 18, 2006	Mount Lemmon	Mount Lemmon Survey	·	2.8 km	MPC · JPL
438456	2007 BZ_{34}	—	January 24, 2007	Mount Lemmon	Mount Lemmon Survey	·	3.0 km	MPC · JPL
438457	2007 BK_{61}	—	December 21, 2006	Kitt Peak	Spacewatch	·	850 m	MPC · JPL
438458	2007 BM_{62}	—	December 27, 2006	Mount Lemmon	Mount Lemmon Survey	(2076)	640 m	MPC · JPL
438459	2007 BN_{69}	—	January 27, 2007	Mount Lemmon	Mount Lemmon Survey	·	1.2 km	MPC · JPL
438460	2007 BY_{100}	—	January 27, 2007	Kitt Peak	Spacewatch	·	4.4 km	MPC · JPL
438461	2007 CC_{3}	—	January 10, 2007	Kitt Peak	Spacewatch	·	3.1 km	MPC · JPL
438462	2007 CG_{34}	—	January 10, 2007	Mount Lemmon	Mount Lemmon Survey	EOS	2.6 km	MPC · JPL
438463	2007 CY_{36}	—	January 27, 2007	Kitt Peak	Spacewatch	MAS	650 m	MPC · JPL
438464	2007 DH_{3}	—	February 16, 2007	Catalina	CSS	PHO	1.1 km	MPC · JPL
438465	2007 DS_{11}	—	February 16, 2007	Palomar	NEAT	·	3.7 km	MPC · JPL
438466	2007 DJ_{20}	—	February 17, 2007	Kitt Peak	Spacewatch	·	990 m	MPC · JPL
438467	2007 DM_{59}	—	February 22, 2007	Kitt Peak	Spacewatch	·	1.2 km	MPC · JPL
438468	2007 DU_{64}	—	February 21, 2007	Kitt Peak	Spacewatch	·	980 m	MPC · JPL
438469	2007 DV_{109}	—	February 17, 2007	Kitt Peak	Spacewatch	·	990 m	MPC · JPL
438470	2007 EG_{11}	—	December 27, 2006	Mount Lemmon	Mount Lemmon Survey	·	1.1 km	MPC · JPL
438471	2007 EF_{12}	—	March 9, 2007	Catalina	CSS	·	2.6 km	MPC · JPL
438472	2007 EH_{64}	—	March 10, 2007	Mount Lemmon	Mount Lemmon Survey	·	920 m	MPC · JPL
438473	2007 EZ_{74}	—	March 10, 2007	Kitt Peak	Spacewatch	MAS	710 m	MPC · JPL
438474	2007 ET_{84}	—	March 12, 2007	Catalina	CSS	·	1.2 km	MPC · JPL
438475	2007 EJ_{113}	—	March 12, 2007	Kitt Peak	Spacewatch	MAS	750 m	MPC · JPL
438476	2007 EL_{114}	—	January 27, 2007	Kitt Peak	Spacewatch	·	920 m	MPC · JPL
438477	2007 ED_{128}	—	April 13, 1996	Kitt Peak	Spacewatch	·	1.1 km	MPC · JPL
438478	2007 EQ_{137}	—	February 23, 2007	Mount Lemmon	Mount Lemmon Survey	·	1.0 km	MPC · JPL
438479	2007 EK_{173}	—	March 14, 2007	Kitt Peak	Spacewatch	·	1.0 km	MPC · JPL
438480	2007 EX_{174}	—	March 14, 2007	Kitt Peak	Spacewatch	·	1.4 km	MPC · JPL
438481	2007 ED_{195}	—	February 25, 2007	Mount Lemmon	Mount Lemmon Survey	·	910 m	MPC · JPL
438482	2007 EG_{197}	—	March 15, 2007	Kitt Peak	Spacewatch	·	950 m	MPC · JPL
438483	2007 EY_{221}	—	July 4, 2005	Mount Lemmon	Mount Lemmon Survey	·	890 m	MPC · JPL
438484	2007 EG_{224}	—	March 14, 2007	Kitt Peak	Spacewatch	NYS	940 m	MPC · JPL
438485	2007 FD_{25}	—	March 20, 2007	Kitt Peak	Spacewatch	·	1.1 km	MPC · JPL
438486	2007 FZ_{28}	—	March 20, 2007	Mount Lemmon	Mount Lemmon Survey	NYS	960 m	MPC · JPL
438487	2007 FO_{48}	—	March 20, 2007	Kitt Peak	Spacewatch	·	940 m	MPC · JPL
438488	2007 GM_{18}	—	April 11, 2007	Kitt Peak	Spacewatch	·	1.0 km	MPC · JPL
438489	2007 GS_{26}	—	April 14, 2007	Kitt Peak	Spacewatch	·	1.1 km	MPC · JPL
438490	2007 GG_{31}	—	March 13, 2003	Kitt Peak	Spacewatch	NYS	1.0 km	MPC · JPL
438491	2007 GG_{64}	—	April 15, 2007	Kitt Peak	Spacewatch	·	980 m	MPC · JPL
438492	2007 HB_{85}	—	April 24, 2007	Kitt Peak	Spacewatch	MAS	960 m	MPC · JPL
438493	2007 HN_{96}	—	April 18, 2007	Kitt Peak	Spacewatch	NYS	910 m	MPC · JPL
438494	2007 NR_{6}	—	July 15, 2007	Siding Spring	SSS	EUN	1.4 km	MPC · JPL
438495	2007 OY_{7}	—	July 28, 2007	Pla D'Arguines	R. Ferrando	EUN	1.1 km	MPC · JPL
438496	2007 PH_{7}	—	August 5, 2007	Socorro	LINEAR	·	1.4 km	MPC · JPL
438497	2007 PN_{17}	—	August 9, 2007	Socorro	LINEAR	·	1.0 km	MPC · JPL
438498	2007 PP_{29}	—	August 12, 2007	Great Shefford	Birtwhistle, P.	·	1.2 km	MPC · JPL
438499	2007 PO_{45}	—	August 12, 2007	Siding Spring	SSS	JUN	1.2 km	MPC · JPL
438500	2007 QO_{1}	—	August 16, 2007	Socorro	LINEAR	·	1.3 km	MPC · JPL

== 438501–438600 ==
back to top

Designation			Discovery			Properties		Ref
Permanent	Provisional	Named after	Date	Site	Discoverer(s)	Category	Diam.	Ref
438501	2007 QY_{3}	—	August 16, 2007	San Marcello	San Marcello	·	1.3 km	MPC · JPL
438502	2007 QG_{17}	—	August 23, 2007	Kitt Peak	Spacewatch	·	1.2 km	MPC · JPL
438503	2007 RX_{27}	—	August 16, 2007	XuYi	PMO NEO Survey Program	·	1.2 km	MPC · JPL
438504	2007 RV_{29}	—	September 4, 2007	Catalina	CSS	·	4.5 km	MPC · JPL
438505	2007 RM_{34}	—	September 6, 2007	Anderson Mesa	LONEOS	·	1.4 km	MPC · JPL
438506	2007 RG_{55}	—	September 9, 2007	Kitt Peak	Spacewatch	·	1.0 km	MPC · JPL
438507	2007 RG_{70}	—	September 10, 2007	Kitt Peak	Spacewatch	L4	7.8 km	MPC · JPL
438508	2007 RP_{70}	—	August 24, 2007	Kitt Peak	Spacewatch	·	1.4 km	MPC · JPL
438509	2007 RO_{72}	—	September 10, 2007	Mount Lemmon	Mount Lemmon Survey	·	1.8 km	MPC · JPL
438510	2007 RQ_{98}	—	September 10, 2007	Kitt Peak	Spacewatch	·	1.2 km	MPC · JPL
438511	2007 RF_{144}	—	September 14, 2007	Socorro	LINEAR	·	1.4 km	MPC · JPL
438512	2007 RD_{153}	—	August 24, 2007	Kitt Peak	Spacewatch	·	1.7 km	MPC · JPL
438513	2007 RD_{154}	—	August 24, 2007	Kitt Peak	Spacewatch	·	1.0 km	MPC · JPL
438514	2007 RE_{177}	—	September 10, 2007	Mount Lemmon	Mount Lemmon Survey	·	1.4 km	MPC · JPL
438515	2007 RE_{194}	—	November 18, 2003	Kitt Peak	Spacewatch	·	940 m	MPC · JPL
438516	2007 RM_{229}	—	September 11, 2007	Mount Lemmon	Mount Lemmon Survey	EUN	1.3 km	MPC · JPL
438517	2007 RM_{245}	—	September 11, 2007	Kitt Peak	Spacewatch	MIS	2.7 km	MPC · JPL
438518	2007 RS_{265}	—	September 15, 2007	Mount Lemmon	Mount Lemmon Survey	MIS	2.6 km	MPC · JPL
438519	2007 RO_{269}	—	September 15, 2007	Anderson Mesa	LONEOS	·	2.6 km	MPC · JPL
438520	2007 RZ_{297}	—	September 5, 2007	Anderson Mesa	LONEOS	·	2.6 km	MPC · JPL
438521	2007 RZ_{309}	—	September 3, 2007	Catalina	CSS	GEF	1.3 km	MPC · JPL
438522	2007 RJ_{321}	—	September 14, 2007	Socorro	LINEAR	·	1.6 km	MPC · JPL
438523 Figalli	2007 SC_{12}	Figalli	September 30, 2007	Farra d'Isonzo	Farra d'Isonzo	·	1.4 km	MPC · JPL
438524	2007 TQ	—	October 3, 2007	Mayhill	Lowe, A.	·	1.8 km	MPC · JPL
438525	2007 TU	—	September 12, 2007	Mount Lemmon	Mount Lemmon Survey	·	1.1 km	MPC · JPL
438526	2007 TT_{34}	—	October 6, 2007	Kitt Peak	Spacewatch	·	1.7 km	MPC · JPL
438527	2007 TB_{42}	—	October 7, 2007	Mount Lemmon	Mount Lemmon Survey	·	1.4 km	MPC · JPL
438528	2007 TW_{55}	—	October 4, 2007	Kitt Peak	Spacewatch	·	1.4 km	MPC · JPL
438529	2007 TE_{64}	—	October 7, 2007	Mount Lemmon	Mount Lemmon Survey	AGN	1.4 km	MPC · JPL
438530	2007 TV_{65}	—	October 9, 2007	Socorro	LINEAR	·	1.6 km	MPC · JPL
438531	2007 TT_{70}	—	September 5, 2007	Anderson Mesa	LONEOS	·	1.4 km	MPC · JPL
438532	2007 TC_{83}	—	September 12, 2007	Mount Lemmon	Mount Lemmon Survey	·	2.1 km	MPC · JPL
438533	2007 TO_{85}	—	October 8, 2007	Catalina	CSS	·	2.4 km	MPC · JPL
438534	2007 TP_{109}	—	October 7, 2007	Catalina	CSS	·	2.2 km	MPC · JPL
438535	2007 TS_{111}	—	October 8, 2007	Catalina	CSS	·	1.9 km	MPC · JPL
438536	2007 TL_{158}	—	October 9, 2007	Socorro	LINEAR	·	910 m	MPC · JPL
438537	2007 TZ_{165}	—	October 11, 2007	Socorro	LINEAR	(1547)	1.9 km	MPC · JPL
438538	2007 TW_{167}	—	October 25, 2003	Kitt Peak	Spacewatch	·	1.2 km	MPC · JPL
438539	2007 TC_{176}	—	October 5, 2007	Kitt Peak	Spacewatch	·	1.8 km	MPC · JPL
438540	2007 TV_{189}	—	September 20, 2003	Kitt Peak	Spacewatch	(5)	960 m	MPC · JPL
438541	2007 TA_{198}	—	October 8, 2007	Kitt Peak	Spacewatch	HOF	2.5 km	MPC · JPL
438542	2007 TM_{207}	—	October 10, 2007	Mount Lemmon	Mount Lemmon Survey	·	870 m	MPC · JPL
438543	2007 TN_{214}	—	October 7, 2007	Kitt Peak	Spacewatch	·	1.9 km	MPC · JPL
438544	2007 TL_{220}	—	March 10, 2005	Mount Lemmon	Mount Lemmon Survey	·	2.0 km	MPC · JPL
438545	2007 TV_{220}	—	October 8, 2007	Mount Lemmon	Mount Lemmon Survey	·	1.2 km	MPC · JPL
438546	2007 TK_{224}	—	October 11, 2007	Mount Lemmon	Mount Lemmon Survey	H	660 m	MPC · JPL
438547	2007 TN_{224}	—	October 11, 2007	Kitt Peak	Spacewatch	·	1.5 km	MPC · JPL
438548	2007 TJ_{230}	—	October 8, 2007	Kitt Peak	Spacewatch	·	1.7 km	MPC · JPL
438549	2007 TW_{243}	—	October 8, 2007	Catalina	CSS	(5)	1.1 km	MPC · JPL
438550	2007 TH_{248}	—	October 10, 2007	Anderson Mesa	LONEOS	·	1.2 km	MPC · JPL
438551	2007 TL_{267}	—	September 14, 2007	Mount Lemmon	Mount Lemmon Survey	·	2.0 km	MPC · JPL
438552	2007 TA_{269}	—	October 9, 2007	Kitt Peak	Spacewatch	·	1.3 km	MPC · JPL
438553	2007 TH_{275}	—	October 11, 2007	Catalina	CSS	·	1.8 km	MPC · JPL
438554	2007 TL_{294}	—	September 11, 2007	Kitt Peak	Spacewatch	·	900 m	MPC · JPL
438555	2007 TF_{297}	—	September 6, 2007	Anderson Mesa	LONEOS	·	1.6 km	MPC · JPL
438556	2007 TF_{301}	—	October 12, 2007	Kitt Peak	Spacewatch	·	1.3 km	MPC · JPL
438557	2007 TQ_{327}	—	October 11, 2007	Kitt Peak	Spacewatch	WIT	1.0 km	MPC · JPL
438558	2007 TJ_{331}	—	October 11, 2007	Kitt Peak	Spacewatch	·	1.4 km	MPC · JPL
438559	2007 TR_{336}	—	October 12, 2007	Kitt Peak	Spacewatch	(5)	1.2 km	MPC · JPL
438560	2007 TF_{368}	—	October 10, 2007	Mount Lemmon	Mount Lemmon Survey	KOR	1.1 km	MPC · JPL
438561	2007 TC_{406}	—	October 14, 2007	Kitt Peak	Spacewatch	·	1.2 km	MPC · JPL
438562	2007 TW_{411}	—	September 12, 2007	Catalina	CSS	·	2.0 km	MPC · JPL
438563	2007 TC_{420}	—	October 9, 2007	Catalina	CSS	MAR	1.2 km	MPC · JPL
438564	2007 TX_{423}	—	September 14, 2007	Mount Lemmon	Mount Lemmon Survey	·	1.3 km	MPC · JPL
438565	2007 TU_{433}	—	October 12, 2007	Anderson Mesa	LONEOS	·	1.0 km	MPC · JPL
438566	2007 TN_{436}	—	September 11, 2007	XuYi	PMO NEO Survey Program	(5)	1.0 km	MPC · JPL
438567	2007 TW_{441}	—	October 8, 2007	Catalina	CSS	EUN	1.0 km	MPC · JPL
438568	2007 TV_{445}	—	October 8, 2007	Kitt Peak	Spacewatch	·	1.1 km	MPC · JPL
438569	2007 TL_{450}	—	October 12, 2007	Kitt Peak	Spacewatch	·	1.4 km	MPC · JPL
438570	2007 UM_{3}	—	October 16, 2007	Andrushivka	Andrushivka	·	2.4 km	MPC · JPL
438571	2007 UJ_{6}	—	October 21, 2007	Prairie Grass	Mahony, J.	·	1.8 km	MPC · JPL
438572	2007 UB_{7}	—	October 23, 2007	Sierra Stars	Tozzi, F.	·	1.3 km	MPC · JPL
438573	2007 UN_{7}	—	October 16, 2007	Catalina	CSS	·	2.8 km	MPC · JPL
438574	2007 UY_{11}	—	October 22, 2007	Socorro	LINEAR	·	2.1 km	MPC · JPL
438575	2007 UO_{21}	—	October 16, 2007	Kitt Peak	Spacewatch	·	830 m	MPC · JPL
438576	2007 UH_{52}	—	October 16, 2007	Mount Lemmon	Mount Lemmon Survey	·	1.2 km	MPC · JPL
438577	2007 UT_{56}	—	October 30, 2007	Mount Lemmon	Mount Lemmon Survey	·	1.7 km	MPC · JPL
438578	2007 UM_{68}	—	October 30, 2007	Catalina	CSS	·	1.0 km	MPC · JPL
438579	2007 UB_{85}	—	October 8, 2007	Kitt Peak	Spacewatch	·	2.4 km	MPC · JPL
438580	2007 UP_{91}	—	September 9, 2007	Mount Lemmon	Mount Lemmon Survey	PAD	1.3 km	MPC · JPL
438581	2007 UG_{100}	—	October 30, 2007	Kitt Peak	Spacewatch	·	1.8 km	MPC · JPL
438582	2007 UC_{107}	—	September 9, 2007	Mount Lemmon	Mount Lemmon Survey	MIS	2.0 km	MPC · JPL
438583	2007 UH_{109}	—	September 10, 2007	Mount Lemmon	Mount Lemmon Survey	·	1.3 km	MPC · JPL
438584	2007 UD_{110}	—	October 30, 2007	Mount Lemmon	Mount Lemmon Survey	AST	1.5 km	MPC · JPL
438585	2007 UA_{116}	—	October 10, 2007	Mount Lemmon	Mount Lemmon Survey	ADE	1.6 km	MPC · JPL
438586	2007 UZ_{117}	—	October 12, 2007	Kitt Peak	Spacewatch	·	1.9 km	MPC · JPL
438587	2007 VR_{23}	—	November 2, 2007	Catalina	CSS	·	1.5 km	MPC · JPL
438588	2007 VB_{32}	—	November 2, 2007	Kitt Peak	Spacewatch	·	1.7 km	MPC · JPL
438589	2007 VL_{34}	—	November 3, 2007	Kitt Peak	Spacewatch	·	1.5 km	MPC · JPL
438590	2007 VD_{42}	—	October 16, 2007	Kitt Peak	Spacewatch	·	1.1 km	MPC · JPL
438591	2007 VK_{46}	—	November 1, 2007	Kitt Peak	Spacewatch	·	2.2 km	MPC · JPL
438592	2007 VS_{47}	—	November 1, 2007	Kitt Peak	Spacewatch	WIT	900 m	MPC · JPL
438593	2007 VV_{51}	—	November 1, 2007	Kitt Peak	Spacewatch	PAD	1.6 km	MPC · JPL
438594	2007 VA_{52}	—	November 1, 2007	Kitt Peak	Spacewatch	·	1.3 km	MPC · JPL
438595	2007 VL_{53}	—	October 20, 2007	Mount Lemmon	Mount Lemmon Survey	·	2.2 km	MPC · JPL
438596	2007 VC_{66}	—	November 2, 2007	Mount Lemmon	Mount Lemmon Survey	·	1.7 km	MPC · JPL
438597	2007 VV_{75}	—	September 15, 2007	Mount Lemmon	Mount Lemmon Survey	KOR	1.3 km	MPC · JPL
438598	2007 VF_{93}	—	November 3, 2007	Socorro	LINEAR	ADE	3.4 km	MPC · JPL
438599	2007 VZ_{96}	—	November 1, 2007	Kitt Peak	Spacewatch	PAD	1.6 km	MPC · JPL
438600	2007 VB_{99}	—	April 9, 2005	Mount Lemmon	Mount Lemmon Survey	·	1.9 km	MPC · JPL

== 438601–438700 ==
back to top

Designation			Discovery			Properties		Ref
Permanent	Provisional	Named after	Date	Site	Discoverer(s)	Category	Diam.	Ref
438601	2007 VH_{102}	—	November 2, 2007	Kitt Peak	Spacewatch	KOR	1.4 km	MPC · JPL
438602	2007 VV_{110}	—	November 3, 2007	Kitt Peak	Spacewatch	·	1.9 km	MPC · JPL
438603	2007 VL_{173}	—	November 2, 2007	Mount Lemmon	Mount Lemmon Survey	·	2.3 km	MPC · JPL
438604	2007 VA_{197}	—	October 31, 2007	Mount Lemmon	Mount Lemmon Survey	·	1.5 km	MPC · JPL
438605	2007 VM_{217}	—	November 5, 2007	Kitt Peak	Spacewatch	·	2.1 km	MPC · JPL
438606	2007 VJ_{242}	—	November 5, 2007	XuYi	PMO NEO Survey Program	·	1.5 km	MPC · JPL
438607	2007 VH_{248}	—	June 20, 2006	Kitt Peak	Spacewatch	·	2.0 km	MPC · JPL
438608	2007 VC_{275}	—	November 4, 2007	Mount Lemmon	Mount Lemmon Survey	·	2.1 km	MPC · JPL
438609	2007 VG_{290}	—	November 14, 2007	Kitt Peak	Spacewatch	·	1.9 km	MPC · JPL
438610	2007 VS_{297}	—	October 11, 2007	Catalina	CSS	·	1.8 km	MPC · JPL
438611	2007 VQ_{311}	—	November 13, 2007	Kitt Peak	Spacewatch	AGN	1.2 km	MPC · JPL
438612	2007 VL_{325}	—	November 2, 2007	Socorro	LINEAR	·	2.1 km	MPC · JPL
438613	2007 VE_{327}	—	November 6, 2007	Kitt Peak	Spacewatch	·	2.3 km	MPC · JPL
438614	2007 VX_{328}	—	November 10, 2007	XuYi	PMO NEO Survey Program	526	2.6 km	MPC · JPL
438615	2007 WT_{58}	—	November 18, 2007	Kitt Peak	Spacewatch	·	2.5 km	MPC · JPL
438616	2007 XW_{2}	—	November 5, 2007	Mount Lemmon	Mount Lemmon Survey	·	2.9 km	MPC · JPL
438617	2007 XM_{22}	—	December 5, 2007	Kitt Peak	Spacewatch	·	2.4 km	MPC · JPL
438618	2007 XE_{23}	—	September 20, 2007	Catalina	CSS	·	1.8 km	MPC · JPL
438619	2007 XE_{53}	—	December 14, 2007	Mount Lemmon	Mount Lemmon Survey	·	3.8 km	MPC · JPL
438620	2007 XM_{53}	—	December 14, 2007	Mount Lemmon	Mount Lemmon Survey	·	2.2 km	MPC · JPL
438621	2007 XT_{57}	—	December 4, 2007	Mount Lemmon	Mount Lemmon Survey	·	2.6 km	MPC · JPL
438622	2007 YN_{19}	—	December 4, 2007	Kitt Peak	Spacewatch	·	2.8 km	MPC · JPL
438623	2007 YP_{19}	—	December 3, 2007	Kitt Peak	Spacewatch	·	3.1 km	MPC · JPL
438624	2007 YY_{23}	—	December 17, 2007	Mount Lemmon	Mount Lemmon Survey	EOS	2.5 km	MPC · JPL
438625	2007 YN_{30}	—	December 18, 2007	Kitt Peak	Spacewatch	·	3.0 km	MPC · JPL
438626	2007 YD_{65}	—	December 31, 2007	Kitt Peak	Spacewatch	·	3.4 km	MPC · JPL
438627	2007 YN_{72}	—	December 18, 2007	Kitt Peak	Spacewatch	·	2.1 km	MPC · JPL
438628	2008 AL_{1}	—	November 7, 2007	Mount Lemmon	Mount Lemmon Survey	EOS	2.3 km	MPC · JPL
438629	2008 AD_{26}	—	January 10, 2008	Mount Lemmon	Mount Lemmon Survey	·	2.0 km	MPC · JPL
438630	2008 AP_{82}	—	January 14, 2008	Kitt Peak	Spacewatch	·	820 m	MPC · JPL
438631	2008 AL_{91}	—	January 13, 2008	Kitt Peak	Spacewatch	·	4.3 km	MPC · JPL
438632	2008 AV_{94}	—	December 31, 2007	Mount Lemmon	Mount Lemmon Survey	·	2.1 km	MPC · JPL
438633	2008 AA_{113}	—	October 18, 2007	Catalina	CSS	·	1.6 km	MPC · JPL
438634	2008 AN_{128}	—	January 13, 2008	Kitt Peak	Spacewatch	·	2.8 km	MPC · JPL
438635	2008 BP_{9}	—	January 16, 2008	Kitt Peak	Spacewatch	·	3.4 km	MPC · JPL
438636	2008 BL_{14}	—	November 21, 2007	Catalina	CSS	·	4.2 km	MPC · JPL
438637	2008 CY_{13}	—	February 3, 2008	Kitt Peak	Spacewatch	·	3.3 km	MPC · JPL
438638	2008 CD_{30}	—	February 2, 2008	Kitt Peak	Spacewatch	·	2.4 km	MPC · JPL
438639	2008 CU_{32}	—	February 2, 2008	Kitt Peak	Spacewatch	·	3.2 km	MPC · JPL
438640	2008 CH_{36}	—	February 2, 2008	Kitt Peak	Spacewatch	·	1.9 km	MPC · JPL
438641	2008 CF_{58}	—	January 18, 2008	Kitt Peak	Spacewatch	HYG	2.5 km	MPC · JPL
438642	2008 CG_{89}	—	February 7, 2008	Kitt Peak	Spacewatch	·	750 m	MPC · JPL
438643	2008 CS_{100}	—	January 1, 2008	Kitt Peak	Spacewatch	·	3.2 km	MPC · JPL
438644	2008 CZ_{112}	—	February 10, 2008	Kitt Peak	Spacewatch	·	5.2 km	MPC · JPL
438645	2008 CY_{130}	—	January 20, 2008	Mount Lemmon	Mount Lemmon Survey	EOS	1.9 km	MPC · JPL
438646	2008 CL_{135}	—	February 8, 2008	Mount Lemmon	Mount Lemmon Survey	·	510 m	MPC · JPL
438647	2008 CK_{137}	—	August 28, 2006	Kitt Peak	Spacewatch	·	570 m	MPC · JPL
438648	2008 CR_{159}	—	February 9, 2008	Kitt Peak	Spacewatch	·	1.5 km	MPC · JPL
438649	2008 CS_{163}	—	January 10, 2008	Mount Lemmon	Mount Lemmon Survey	·	3.4 km	MPC · JPL
438650	2008 CR_{166}	—	February 11, 2008	Mount Lemmon	Mount Lemmon Survey	·	1.9 km	MPC · JPL
438651	2008 CL_{170}	—	January 11, 2008	Mount Lemmon	Mount Lemmon Survey	·	3.7 km	MPC · JPL
438652	2008 CW_{181}	—	February 11, 2008	Mount Lemmon	Mount Lemmon Survey	THB	2.5 km	MPC · JPL
438653	2008 CS_{201}	—	February 8, 2008	Kitt Peak	Spacewatch	HYG	2.4 km	MPC · JPL
438654	2008 CZ_{203}	—	February 13, 2008	Kitt Peak	Spacewatch	·	550 m	MPC · JPL
438655	2008 DC_{51}	—	February 29, 2008	Mount Lemmon	Mount Lemmon Survey	·	3.1 km	MPC · JPL
438656	2008 DU_{61}	—	July 4, 2005	Mount Lemmon	Mount Lemmon Survey	AGN	1.4 km	MPC · JPL
438657	2008 DY_{61}	—	February 28, 2008	Mount Lemmon	Mount Lemmon Survey	·	610 m	MPC · JPL
438658	2008 DK_{66}	—	February 28, 2008	Mount Lemmon	Mount Lemmon Survey	(1118)	3.6 km	MPC · JPL
438659	2008 DP_{84}	—	February 28, 2008	Kitt Peak	Spacewatch	·	2.9 km	MPC · JPL
438660	2008 DF_{89}	—	February 28, 2008	Kitt Peak	Spacewatch	·	630 m	MPC · JPL
438661	2008 EP_{6}	—	March 5, 2008	Siding Spring	SSS	APO · PHA	510 m	MPC · JPL
438662	2008 EV_{24}	—	February 18, 2008	Mount Lemmon	Mount Lemmon Survey	·	2.7 km	MPC · JPL
438663	2008 EL_{38}	—	March 4, 2008	Kitt Peak	Spacewatch	·	2.7 km	MPC · JPL
438664	2008 EW_{117}	—	March 9, 2008	Mount Lemmon	Mount Lemmon Survey	·	2.8 km	MPC · JPL
438665	2008 EE_{124}	—	March 10, 2008	Kitt Peak	Spacewatch	·	580 m	MPC · JPL
438666	2008 EF_{125}	—	March 10, 2008	Catalina	CSS	·	3.2 km	MPC · JPL
438667	2008 EJ_{157}	—	March 15, 2008	Mount Lemmon	Mount Lemmon Survey	·	2.9 km	MPC · JPL
438668	2008 EW_{161}	—	March 10, 2008	Kitt Peak	Spacewatch	·	650 m	MPC · JPL
438669	2008 FL_{23}	—	March 27, 2008	Kitt Peak	Spacewatch	PHO	950 m	MPC · JPL
438670	2008 FF_{39}	—	March 5, 2008	Mount Lemmon	Mount Lemmon Survey	·	780 m	MPC · JPL
438671	2008 FQ_{56}	—	October 1, 1995	Kitt Peak	Spacewatch	·	520 m	MPC · JPL
438672	2008 FQ_{96}	—	March 29, 2008	Kitt Peak	Spacewatch	·	810 m	MPC · JPL
438673	2008 GY_{15}	—	April 3, 2008	Mount Lemmon	Mount Lemmon Survey	·	2.9 km	MPC · JPL
438674	2008 GQ_{31}	—	April 3, 2008	Kitt Peak	Spacewatch	PHO	2.5 km	MPC · JPL
438675	2008 GS_{43}	—	March 15, 2008	Kitt Peak	Spacewatch	CYB	3.2 km	MPC · JPL
438676	2008 GW_{82}	—	April 8, 2008	Kitt Peak	Spacewatch	·	680 m	MPC · JPL
438677	2008 GF_{89}	—	April 6, 2008	Mount Lemmon	Mount Lemmon Survey	·	550 m	MPC · JPL
438678	2008 GB_{98}	—	April 3, 2008	Kitt Peak	Spacewatch	·	780 m	MPC · JPL
438679	2008 GK_{115}	—	April 11, 2008	Kitt Peak	Spacewatch	·	640 m	MPC · JPL
438680	2008 GY_{134}	—	April 7, 2008	Kitt Peak	Spacewatch	·	610 m	MPC · JPL
438681	2008 GO_{140}	—	April 8, 2008	Kitt Peak	Spacewatch	EOS	2.1 km	MPC · JPL
438682	2008 HB_{22}	—	April 26, 2008	Kitt Peak	Spacewatch	L5	11 km	MPC · JPL
438683	2008 HE_{26}	—	August 29, 2005	Kitt Peak	Spacewatch	·	480 m	MPC · JPL
438684	2008 HS_{36}	—	May 8, 1994	Kitt Peak	Spacewatch	·	670 m	MPC · JPL
438685	2008 JM_{7}	—	April 6, 2008	Mount Lemmon	Mount Lemmon Survey	·	910 m	MPC · JPL
438686	2008 JB_{14}	—	May 6, 2008	Mount Lemmon	Mount Lemmon Survey	(2076)	730 m	MPC · JPL
438687	2008 JE_{37}	—	May 13, 2008	Mount Lemmon	Mount Lemmon Survey	EOS	2.3 km	MPC · JPL
438688	2008 LX_{10}	—	June 6, 2008	Kitt Peak	Spacewatch	PHO	810 m	MPC · JPL
438689	2008 LB_{17}	—	May 15, 2008	Mount Lemmon	Mount Lemmon Survey	·	760 m	MPC · JPL
438690	2008 OG_{20}	—	July 30, 2008	Kitt Peak	Spacewatch	PHO	1.1 km	MPC · JPL
438691	2008 PJ_{11}	—	July 30, 2008	Mount Lemmon	Mount Lemmon Survey	MAS	780 m	MPC · JPL
438692	2008 PO_{12}	—	August 9, 2008	Dauban	Kugel, F.	·	2.6 km	MPC · JPL
438693	2008 PL_{15}	—	July 26, 2008	Siding Spring	SSS	·	1.6 km	MPC · JPL
438694	2008 PZ_{19}	—	August 7, 2008	Kitt Peak	Spacewatch	3:2 · SHU	5.0 km	MPC · JPL
438695	2008 QA_{8}	—	July 29, 2008	Kitt Peak	Spacewatch	MAS	730 m	MPC · JPL
438696	2008 QF_{26}	—	August 29, 2008	La Sagra	OAM	T_{j} (2.99) · 3:2	4.5 km	MPC · JPL
438697	2008 QE_{27}	—	November 12, 2005	Kitt Peak	Spacewatch	·	890 m	MPC · JPL
438698	2008 QU_{36}	—	August 21, 2008	Kitt Peak	Spacewatch	·	1.1 km	MPC · JPL
438699	2008 RK_{32}	—	September 2, 2008	Kitt Peak	Spacewatch	MAS	720 m	MPC · JPL
438700	2008 RV_{49}	—	July 29, 2008	Mount Lemmon	Mount Lemmon Survey	V	480 m	MPC · JPL

== 438701–438800 ==
back to top

Designation			Discovery			Properties		Ref
Permanent	Provisional	Named after	Date	Site	Discoverer(s)	Category	Diam.	Ref
438701	2008 RC_{58}	—	September 3, 2008	Kitt Peak	Spacewatch	·	1.3 km	MPC · JPL
438702	2008 RQ_{61}	—	September 4, 2008	Kitt Peak	Spacewatch	·	1.2 km	MPC · JPL
438703	2008 RX_{87}	—	September 5, 2008	Kitt Peak	Spacewatch	·	1.1 km	MPC · JPL
438704	2008 RU_{110}	—	September 3, 2008	Kitt Peak	Spacewatch	·	1.2 km	MPC · JPL
438705	2008 RM_{111}	—	September 4, 2008	Kitt Peak	Spacewatch	·	2.2 km	MPC · JPL
438706	2008 RA_{115}	—	September 6, 2008	Mount Lemmon	Mount Lemmon Survey	PHO	820 m	MPC · JPL
438707	2008 RB_{136}	—	September 4, 2008	Socorro	LINEAR	PHO	770 m	MPC · JPL
438708	2008 RW_{136}	—	September 4, 2008	Kitt Peak	Spacewatch	(2076)	900 m	MPC · JPL
438709	2008 RS_{142}	—	September 8, 2008	Kitt Peak	Spacewatch	·	850 m	MPC · JPL
438710	2008 SP_{6}	—	September 5, 2008	Kitt Peak	Spacewatch	·	1.0 km	MPC · JPL
438711	2008 SG_{7}	—	September 22, 2008	Goodricke-Pigott	R. A. Tucker	NYS	950 m	MPC · JPL
438712	2008 SD_{58}	—	September 20, 2008	Kitt Peak	Spacewatch	·	1.3 km	MPC · JPL
438713	2008 SJ_{59}	—	September 20, 2008	Kitt Peak	Spacewatch	·	1.1 km	MPC · JPL
438714	2008 SG_{84}	—	September 27, 2008	Sierra Stars	Tozzi, F.	·	1.1 km	MPC · JPL
438715	2008 SN_{92}	—	September 21, 2008	Kitt Peak	Spacewatch	·	1.3 km	MPC · JPL
438716	2008 SN_{94}	—	August 22, 2004	Kitt Peak	Spacewatch	·	1.0 km	MPC · JPL
438717	2008 SF_{96}	—	September 21, 2008	Kitt Peak	Spacewatch	V	650 m	MPC · JPL
438718	2008 SF_{101}	—	September 21, 2008	Kitt Peak	Spacewatch	·	1.1 km	MPC · JPL
438719	2008 SF_{102}	—	September 21, 2008	Kitt Peak	Spacewatch	·	1.7 km	MPC · JPL
438720	2008 ST_{137}	—	September 23, 2008	Kitt Peak	Spacewatch	H	570 m	MPC · JPL
438721	2008 SO_{211}	—	September 28, 2008	Mount Lemmon	Mount Lemmon Survey	·	1.6 km	MPC · JPL
438722	2008 SZ_{217}	—	September 30, 2008	Mount Lemmon	Mount Lemmon Survey	·	1.4 km	MPC · JPL
438723	2008 SH_{226}	—	September 27, 2008	Bergisch Gladbach	W. Bickel	·	2.7 km	MPC · JPL
438724	2008 SL_{242}	—	September 29, 2008	Kitt Peak	Spacewatch	·	1.1 km	MPC · JPL
438725	2008 SU_{242}	—	September 29, 2008	Kitt Peak	Spacewatch	·	2.5 km	MPC · JPL
438726	2008 SL_{248}	—	September 20, 2008	Mount Lemmon	Mount Lemmon Survey	·	1.4 km	MPC · JPL
438727	2008 SR_{287}	—	September 23, 2008	Kitt Peak	Spacewatch	·	1.4 km	MPC · JPL
438728	2008 SZ_{297}	—	September 20, 2008	Kitt Peak	Spacewatch	MAS	700 m	MPC · JPL
438729	2008 SH_{305}	—	September 26, 2008	Kitt Peak	Spacewatch	·	1.3 km	MPC · JPL
438730	2008 SM_{305}	—	September 27, 2008	Mount Lemmon	Mount Lemmon Survey	RAF	830 m	MPC · JPL
438731	2008 SY_{306}	—	September 29, 2008	Socorro	LINEAR	·	1.2 km	MPC · JPL
438732	2008 SQ_{309}	—	September 24, 2008	Kitt Peak	Spacewatch	·	1.8 km	MPC · JPL
438733	2008 TO_{7}	—	October 3, 2008	La Sagra	OAM	·	1.0 km	MPC · JPL
438734	2008 TL_{20}	—	October 1, 2008	Mount Lemmon	Mount Lemmon Survey	NYS	1.1 km	MPC · JPL
438735	2008 TL_{35}	—	October 1, 2008	Mount Lemmon	Mount Lemmon Survey	·	1.8 km	MPC · JPL
438736	2008 TE_{43}	—	September 23, 2008	Catalina	CSS	·	1.7 km	MPC · JPL
438737	2008 TD_{78}	—	October 2, 2008	Mount Lemmon	Mount Lemmon Survey	·	1.2 km	MPC · JPL
438738	2008 TX_{89}	—	October 3, 2008	Kitt Peak	Spacewatch	·	1.3 km	MPC · JPL
438739	2008 TM_{94}	—	September 27, 2008	Mount Lemmon	Mount Lemmon Survey	·	1.2 km	MPC · JPL
438740	2008 TY_{94}	—	October 5, 2008	La Sagra	OAM	·	1.1 km	MPC · JPL
438741	2008 TG_{116}	—	October 6, 2008	Mount Lemmon	Mount Lemmon Survey	L4	7.6 km	MPC · JPL
438742	2008 TP_{128}	—	October 8, 2008	Catalina	CSS	·	1.2 km	MPC · JPL
438743	2008 TL_{156}	—	October 9, 2008	Kitt Peak	Spacewatch	·	1.3 km	MPC · JPL
438744	2008 TF_{161}	—	October 1, 2008	Kitt Peak	Spacewatch	H	610 m	MPC · JPL
438745	2008 TA_{170}	—	October 8, 2008	Kitt Peak	Spacewatch	·	1.9 km	MPC · JPL
438746	2008 TD_{172}	—	October 9, 2008	Mount Lemmon	Mount Lemmon Survey	·	3.2 km	MPC · JPL
438747	2008 TZ_{174}	—	October 8, 2008	Mount Lemmon	Mount Lemmon Survey	L4	7.3 km	MPC · JPL
438748	2008 TS_{187}	—	October 8, 2008	Catalina	CSS	·	1.4 km	MPC · JPL
438749	2008 TX_{188}	—	October 10, 2008	Mount Lemmon	Mount Lemmon Survey	·	1.5 km	MPC · JPL
438750	2008 UB_{36}	—	September 26, 2008	Kitt Peak	Spacewatch	·	1.3 km	MPC · JPL
438751	2008 UP_{53}	—	September 7, 2008	Mount Lemmon	Mount Lemmon Survey	·	1.7 km	MPC · JPL
438752	2008 UR_{55}	—	October 21, 2008	Kitt Peak	Spacewatch	·	1.3 km	MPC · JPL
438753	2008 US_{56}	—	September 7, 2008	Mount Lemmon	Mount Lemmon Survey	NYS	880 m	MPC · JPL
438754	2008 UP_{57}	—	October 21, 2008	Kitt Peak	Spacewatch	NYS	1.0 km	MPC · JPL
438755	2008 UL_{62}	—	October 21, 2008	Kitt Peak	Spacewatch	·	1.3 km	MPC · JPL
438756	2008 UG_{75}	—	October 21, 2008	Kitt Peak	Spacewatch	·	1.6 km	MPC · JPL
438757	2008 UR_{97}	—	September 27, 2008	Mount Lemmon	Mount Lemmon Survey	V	720 m	MPC · JPL
438758	2008 UH_{109}	—	October 21, 2008	Mount Lemmon	Mount Lemmon Survey	·	2.0 km	MPC · JPL
438759	2008 UA_{133}	—	October 23, 2008	Kitt Peak	Spacewatch	MAR	1.0 km	MPC · JPL
438760	2008 UF_{137}	—	October 23, 2008	Kitt Peak	Spacewatch	·	1.1 km	MPC · JPL
438761	2008 UR_{163}	—	September 7, 2008	Mount Lemmon	Mount Lemmon Survey	·	1.4 km	MPC · JPL
438762	2008 UV_{177}	—	October 24, 2008	Mount Lemmon	Mount Lemmon Survey	NYS	1.1 km	MPC · JPL
438763	2008 UC_{179}	—	October 24, 2008	Catalina	CSS	·	2.0 km	MPC · JPL
438764	2008 UT_{186}	—	October 24, 2008	Kitt Peak	Spacewatch	·	1.2 km	MPC · JPL
438765	2008 UV_{212}	—	October 24, 2008	Kitt Peak	Spacewatch	·	1.6 km	MPC · JPL
438766	2008 UN_{223}	—	October 25, 2008	Kitt Peak	Spacewatch	MAR	1.3 km	MPC · JPL
438767	2008 UO_{229}	—	October 25, 2008	Kitt Peak	Spacewatch	·	1.9 km	MPC · JPL
438768	2008 UB_{264}	—	August 4, 2008	Siding Spring	SSS	·	1.0 km	MPC · JPL
438769	2008 UC_{313}	—	October 30, 2008	Catalina	CSS	·	2.7 km	MPC · JPL
438770	2008 UX_{329}	—	September 9, 2008	Mount Lemmon	Mount Lemmon Survey	·	1.2 km	MPC · JPL
438771	2008 UR_{342}	—	October 29, 2008	Kitt Peak	Spacewatch	PHO	1.3 km	MPC · JPL
438772	2008 UM_{343}	—	October 25, 2008	Mount Lemmon	Mount Lemmon Survey	·	1.4 km	MPC · JPL
438773	2008 UK_{349}	—	October 1, 2008	Mount Lemmon	Mount Lemmon Survey	·	1.6 km	MPC · JPL
438774	2008 UP_{349}	—	November 11, 2004	Kitt Peak	Spacewatch	·	1.7 km	MPC · JPL
438775	2008 UZ_{356}	—	October 23, 2008	Kitt Peak	Spacewatch	·	1.4 km	MPC · JPL
438776	2008 UV_{357}	—	October 24, 2008	Kitt Peak	Spacewatch	·	1.8 km	MPC · JPL
438777	2008 UQ_{358}	—	October 26, 2008	Kitt Peak	Spacewatch	H	510 m	MPC · JPL
438778	2008 UZ_{369}	—	October 25, 2008	Socorro	LINEAR	·	1.9 km	MPC · JPL
438779	2008 VR_{12}	—	November 2, 2008	Mount Lemmon	Mount Lemmon Survey	·	3.1 km	MPC · JPL
438780	2008 VK_{28}	—	November 2, 2008	Vail-Jarnac	Jarnac	NYS	1.2 km	MPC · JPL
438781	2008 VF_{51}	—	November 4, 2008	Kitt Peak	Spacewatch	MAS	800 m	MPC · JPL
438782	2008 VO_{64}	—	October 30, 2008	Catalina	CSS	·	1.5 km	MPC · JPL
438783	2008 VX_{77}	—	November 7, 2008	Socorro	LINEAR	PHO	3.4 km	MPC · JPL
438784	2008 VH_{79}	—	November 2, 2008	Mount Lemmon	Mount Lemmon Survey	EUN	1.4 km	MPC · JPL
438785	2008 WP_{49}	—	November 18, 2008	Catalina	CSS	·	1.5 km	MPC · JPL
438786	2008 WF_{67}	—	November 18, 2008	Kitt Peak	Spacewatch	·	1.7 km	MPC · JPL
438787	2008 WM_{67}	—	November 7, 2008	Mount Lemmon	Mount Lemmon Survey	·	1.3 km	MPC · JPL
438788	2008 WR_{81}	—	November 7, 2008	Mount Lemmon	Mount Lemmon Survey	·	1.0 km	MPC · JPL
438789	2008 WP_{126}	—	November 24, 2008	Mount Lemmon	Mount Lemmon Survey	·	1.5 km	MPC · JPL
438790	2008 WV_{139}	—	November 30, 2008	Socorro	LINEAR	·	2.3 km	MPC · JPL
438791	2008 XT_{1}	—	December 1, 2008	Skylive	Tozzi, F.	H	660 m	MPC · JPL
438792	2008 XO_{3}	—	December 2, 2008	Socorro	LINEAR	·	1.5 km	MPC · JPL
438793	2008 XO_{8}	—	November 7, 2008	Mount Lemmon	Mount Lemmon Survey	·	1.4 km	MPC · JPL
438794	2008 XC_{16}	—	October 26, 2008	Mount Lemmon	Mount Lemmon Survey	·	1.4 km	MPC · JPL
438795	2008 XU_{29}	—	December 1, 2008	Kitt Peak	Spacewatch	DOR	3.0 km	MPC · JPL
438796	2008 YX_{14}	—	October 27, 2008	Kitt Peak	Spacewatch	·	1.4 km	MPC · JPL
438797	2008 YS_{20}	—	December 21, 2008	Mount Lemmon	Mount Lemmon Survey	·	1.3 km	MPC · JPL
438798	2008 YQ_{30}	—	December 29, 2008	Calvin-Rehoboth	L. A. Molnar	·	1.2 km	MPC · JPL
438799	2008 YF_{38}	—	November 19, 2008	Mount Lemmon	Mount Lemmon Survey	·	1.8 km	MPC · JPL
438800	2008 YN_{38}	—	December 29, 2008	Kitt Peak	Spacewatch	H	660 m	MPC · JPL

== 438801–438900 ==
back to top

Designation			Discovery			Properties		Ref
Permanent	Provisional	Named after	Date	Site	Discoverer(s)	Category	Diam.	Ref
438801	2008 YR_{48}	—	December 29, 2008	Mount Lemmon	Mount Lemmon Survey	AGN	1.0 km	MPC · JPL
438802	2008 YC_{49}	—	December 29, 2008	Mount Lemmon	Mount Lemmon Survey	·	2.7 km	MPC · JPL
438803	2008 YM_{50}	—	December 1, 2008	Mount Lemmon	Mount Lemmon Survey	H	540 m	MPC · JPL
438804	2008 YD_{76}	—	December 30, 2008	Mount Lemmon	Mount Lemmon Survey	H	450 m	MPC · JPL
438805	2008 YB_{84}	—	December 31, 2008	Kitt Peak	Spacewatch	EUN	1.6 km	MPC · JPL
438806	2008 YR_{86}	—	November 20, 2008	Mount Lemmon	Mount Lemmon Survey	·	1.8 km	MPC · JPL
438807	2008 YN_{101}	—	December 29, 2008	Kitt Peak	Spacewatch	HOF	3.0 km	MPC · JPL
438808	2008 YR_{106}	—	December 29, 2008	Kitt Peak	Spacewatch	·	1.6 km	MPC · JPL
438809	2008 YG_{108}	—	December 29, 2008	Kitt Peak	Spacewatch	·	1.9 km	MPC · JPL
438810	2008 YO_{114}	—	December 29, 2008	Kitt Peak	Spacewatch	DOR	2.7 km	MPC · JPL
438811	2008 YJ_{125}	—	December 22, 2008	Kitt Peak	Spacewatch	·	1.9 km	MPC · JPL
438812	2008 YD_{135}	—	November 6, 2008	Mount Lemmon	Mount Lemmon Survey	·	2.2 km	MPC · JPL
438813	2008 YC_{142}	—	December 30, 2008	Kitt Peak	Spacewatch	·	2.8 km	MPC · JPL
438814	2008 YF_{144}	—	December 21, 2008	Mount Lemmon	Mount Lemmon Survey	·	1.1 km	MPC · JPL
438815	2008 YX_{148}	—	December 31, 2008	Kitt Peak	Spacewatch	·	3.1 km	MPC · JPL
438816	2008 YC_{153}	—	December 31, 2008	Kitt Peak	Spacewatch	H	410 m	MPC · JPL
438817	2008 YT_{158}	—	December 30, 2008	Kitt Peak	Spacewatch	HOF	2.3 km	MPC · JPL
438818	2008 YY_{171}	—	December 30, 2008	Mount Lemmon	Mount Lemmon Survey	·	2.4 km	MPC · JPL
438819	2009 AP	—	January 1, 2009	Kitt Peak	Spacewatch	H	600 m	MPC · JPL
438820	2009 AV_{8}	—	October 6, 2008	Mount Lemmon	Mount Lemmon Survey	·	1.6 km	MPC · JPL
438821	2009 AB_{12}	—	September 12, 2007	Mount Lemmon	Mount Lemmon Survey	AST	1.6 km	MPC · JPL
438822	2009 AG_{12}	—	September 14, 2007	Kitt Peak	Spacewatch	·	1.5 km	MPC · JPL
438823	2009 AZ_{13}	—	January 2, 2009	Mount Lemmon	Mount Lemmon Survey	·	1.6 km	MPC · JPL
438824	2009 AN_{15}	—	January 7, 2009	Kitt Peak	Spacewatch	H	520 m	MPC · JPL
438825	2009 AD_{27}	—	December 22, 2008	Mount Lemmon	Mount Lemmon Survey	H	460 m	MPC · JPL
438826	2009 BR_{1}	—	January 17, 2009	Tzec Maun	Tozzi, F.	·	2.8 km	MPC · JPL
438827	2009 BB_{2}	—	January 18, 2009	Catalina	CSS	H	690 m	MPC · JPL
438828	2009 BR_{7}	—	October 29, 2008	Kitt Peak	Spacewatch	·	2.9 km	MPC · JPL
438829 Visena	2009 BY_{7}	Visena	January 21, 2009	Obs. de L' Ametlla120070	Garrigós, A.	(18466)	2.7 km	MPC · JPL
438830	2009 BD_{29}	—	December 21, 2008	Mount Lemmon	Mount Lemmon Survey	·	1.4 km	MPC · JPL
438831	2009 BN_{40}	—	January 16, 2009	Kitt Peak	Spacewatch	GEF	1.2 km	MPC · JPL
438832	2009 BG_{42}	—	January 16, 2009	Kitt Peak	Spacewatch	·	1.8 km	MPC · JPL
438833	2009 BL_{43}	—	November 6, 2008	Mount Lemmon	Mount Lemmon Survey	·	1.3 km	MPC · JPL
438834	2009 BU_{77}	—	January 25, 2009	Socorro	LINEAR	·	1.4 km	MPC · JPL
438835	2009 BA_{84}	—	January 31, 2009	Kitt Peak	Spacewatch	·	1.1 km	MPC · JPL
438836	2009 BR_{104}	—	January 25, 2009	Kitt Peak	Spacewatch	·	1.4 km	MPC · JPL
438837	2009 BK_{106}	—	November 2, 2007	Mount Lemmon	Mount Lemmon Survey	·	2.1 km	MPC · JPL
438838	2009 BE_{109}	—	January 30, 2009	Mount Lemmon	Mount Lemmon Survey	NEM	2.2 km	MPC · JPL
438839	2009 BE_{121}	—	September 14, 2007	Mount Lemmon	Mount Lemmon Survey	KOR	1.4 km	MPC · JPL
438840	2009 BD_{124}	—	January 31, 2009	Kitt Peak	Spacewatch	·	1.7 km	MPC · JPL
438841	2009 BC_{160}	—	January 30, 2009	Kitt Peak	Spacewatch	H	610 m	MPC · JPL
438842	2009 BM_{171}	—	October 19, 2007	Catalina	CSS	·	1.7 km	MPC · JPL
438843	2009 BH_{184}	—	January 16, 2009	Kitt Peak	Spacewatch	H	630 m	MPC · JPL
438844	2009 CE_{8}	—	February 1, 2009	Mount Lemmon	Mount Lemmon Survey	(18466)	2.7 km	MPC · JPL
438845	2009 CC_{25}	—	December 31, 2008	Mount Lemmon	Mount Lemmon Survey	·	1.5 km	MPC · JPL
438846	2009 CJ_{30}	—	February 1, 2009	Kitt Peak	Spacewatch	·	1.6 km	MPC · JPL
438847	2009 CR_{31}	—	February 1, 2009	Kitt Peak	Spacewatch	·	2.0 km	MPC · JPL
438848	2009 CL_{44}	—	February 2, 2009	Catalina	CSS	·	2.6 km	MPC · JPL
438849	2009 CA_{53}	—	February 14, 2009	Mount Lemmon	Mount Lemmon Survey	·	1.7 km	MPC · JPL
438850	2009 CB_{61}	—	February 14, 2009	Mount Lemmon	Mount Lemmon Survey	·	2.3 km	MPC · JPL
438851	2009 DO_{13}	—	July 30, 2005	Siding Spring	SSS	·	3.0 km	MPC · JPL
438852	2009 DG_{22}	—	May 25, 2006	Kitt Peak	Spacewatch	·	2.0 km	MPC · JPL
438853	2009 DB_{39}	—	February 22, 2009	Mount Lemmon	Mount Lemmon Survey	·	3.2 km	MPC · JPL
438854	2009 DX_{55}	—	February 22, 2009	Kitt Peak	Spacewatch	·	1.7 km	MPC · JPL
438855	2009 DR_{93}	—	October 2, 2006	Mount Lemmon	Mount Lemmon Survey	·	2.1 km	MPC · JPL
438856	2009 DL_{107}	—	February 20, 2009	Kitt Peak	Spacewatch	·	1.9 km	MPC · JPL
438857	2009 DF_{121}	—	February 27, 2009	Kitt Peak	Spacewatch	·	1.7 km	MPC · JPL
438858	2009 DA_{131}	—	February 26, 2009	Catalina	CSS	·	3.4 km	MPC · JPL
438859	2009 DY_{141}	—	February 20, 2009	Catalina	CSS	·	2.4 km	MPC · JPL
438860	2009 DG_{142}	—	February 26, 2009	Kitt Peak	Spacewatch	·	2.0 km	MPC · JPL
438861	2009 ER_{17}	—	March 15, 2009	Kitt Peak	Spacewatch	·	1.6 km	MPC · JPL
438862	2009 FX_{33}	—	February 19, 2009	Kitt Peak	Spacewatch	·	1.6 km	MPC · JPL
438863	2009 FY_{48}	—	March 26, 2009	Mount Lemmon	Mount Lemmon Survey	·	2.9 km	MPC · JPL
438864	2009 FY_{63}	—	March 29, 2009	Kitt Peak	Spacewatch	·	3.6 km	MPC · JPL
438865	2009 FR_{73}	—	March 26, 2009	Kitt Peak	Spacewatch	·	1.8 km	MPC · JPL
438866	2009 FC_{74}	—	March 31, 2009	Kitt Peak	Spacewatch	·	2.9 km	MPC · JPL
438867	2009 FB_{75}	—	March 29, 2009	Socorro	LINEAR	·	970 m	MPC · JPL
438868	2009 HF_{7}	—	April 17, 2009	Kitt Peak	Spacewatch	VER	2.7 km	MPC · JPL
438869	2009 HT_{35}	—	April 20, 2009	Mount Lemmon	Mount Lemmon Survey	VER	2.6 km	MPC · JPL
438870	2009 HL_{48}	—	April 19, 2009	Kitt Peak	Spacewatch	·	2.4 km	MPC · JPL
438871	2009 HU_{60}	—	April 19, 2009	Mount Lemmon	Mount Lemmon Survey	·	3.2 km	MPC · JPL
438872	2009 HG_{70}	—	March 26, 2009	Kitt Peak	Spacewatch	·	3.0 km	MPC · JPL
438873	2009 HM_{71}	—	April 22, 2009	Mount Lemmon	Mount Lemmon Survey	·	2.6 km	MPC · JPL
438874	2009 HY_{71}	—	April 25, 2009	Črni Vrh	Skvarč, J.	T_{j} (2.99)	3.1 km	MPC · JPL
438875	2009 HT_{92}	—	April 30, 2009	Kitt Peak	Spacewatch	·	1.7 km	MPC · JPL
438876	2009 HP_{96}	—	April 23, 2009	Kitt Peak	Spacewatch	(43176)	3.3 km	MPC · JPL
438877	2009 HS_{102}	—	April 23, 2009	Kitt Peak	Spacewatch	·	2.8 km	MPC · JPL
438878	2009 HP_{103}	—	April 19, 2009	Kitt Peak	Spacewatch	·	3.3 km	MPC · JPL
438879	2009 RF_{15}	—	September 12, 2009	Kitt Peak	Spacewatch	·	650 m	MPC · JPL
438880	2009 RQ_{15}	—	September 12, 2009	Kitt Peak	Spacewatch	·	540 m	MPC · JPL
438881 Michaelkhan	2009 RD_{28}	Michaelkhan	September 10, 2009	ESA OGS	ESA OGS	·	840 m	MPC · JPL
438882	2009 SS_{46}	—	March 17, 2005	Mount Lemmon	Mount Lemmon Survey	·	680 m	MPC · JPL
438883	2009 SA_{67}	—	September 17, 2009	Kitt Peak	Spacewatch	·	690 m	MPC · JPL
438884	2009 SW_{109}	—	September 17, 2009	Catalina	CSS	·	660 m	MPC · JPL
438885	2009 SN_{154}	—	September 20, 2009	Kitt Peak	Spacewatch	·	680 m	MPC · JPL
438886	2009 SP_{163}	—	September 21, 2009	Kitt Peak	Spacewatch	·	1.1 km	MPC · JPL
438887	2009 SC_{252}	—	September 21, 2009	Kitt Peak	Spacewatch	V	690 m	MPC · JPL
438888	2009 SR_{262}	—	September 23, 2009	Kitt Peak	Spacewatch	·	790 m	MPC · JPL
438889	2009 SA_{313}	—	September 18, 2009	Kitt Peak	Spacewatch	·	530 m	MPC · JPL
438890	2009 SM_{359}	—	September 22, 2009	Kitt Peak	Spacewatch	V	650 m	MPC · JPL
438891	2009 TZ_{34}	—	October 14, 2009	La Sagra	OAM	CYB	4.8 km	MPC · JPL
438892	2009 UO_{11}	—	September 25, 2009	Kitt Peak	Spacewatch	·	650 m	MPC · JPL
438893	2009 UT_{31}	—	October 18, 2009	Mount Lemmon	Mount Lemmon Survey	·	620 m	MPC · JPL
438894	2009 UL_{55}	—	October 23, 2009	Mount Lemmon	Mount Lemmon Survey	·	660 m	MPC · JPL
438895	2009 UZ_{120}	—	October 24, 2009	Catalina	CSS	·	700 m	MPC · JPL
438896	2009 VZ_{102}	—	May 10, 2008	Catalina	CSS	PHO	1.5 km	MPC · JPL
438897	2009 WN	—	November 16, 2009	Catalina	CSS	AMO	950 m	MPC · JPL
438898	2009 WD_{27}	—	November 16, 2009	Kitt Peak	Spacewatch	·	1.2 km	MPC · JPL
438899	2009 WC_{32}	—	November 16, 2009	Kitt Peak	Spacewatch	·	840 m	MPC · JPL
438900	2009 WP_{45}	—	November 18, 2009	Kitt Peak	Spacewatch	PHO	2.7 km	MPC · JPL

== 438901–439000 ==
back to top

Designation			Discovery			Properties		Ref
Permanent	Provisional	Named after	Date	Site	Discoverer(s)	Category	Diam.	Ref
438901	2009 WP_{103}	—	October 25, 2005	Kitt Peak	Spacewatch	·	900 m	MPC · JPL
438902	2009 WF_{104}	—	November 23, 2009	Mount Lemmon	Mount Lemmon Survey	T_{j} (2.8) · AMO +1km	2.2 km	MPC · JPL
438903	2009 WM_{119}	—	November 20, 2009	Kitt Peak	Spacewatch	·	1.3 km	MPC · JPL
438904	2009 WT_{209}	—	November 17, 2009	Kitt Peak	Spacewatch	·	810 m	MPC · JPL
438905	2009 WZ_{210}	—	November 18, 2009	Kitt Peak	Spacewatch	·	1.4 km	MPC · JPL
438906	2009 WG_{245}	—	November 9, 2009	Kitt Peak	Spacewatch	·	1.4 km	MPC · JPL
438907	2009 WC_{263}	—	November 24, 2009	Kitt Peak	Spacewatch	·	1.1 km	MPC · JPL
438908	2009 XO	—	December 9, 2009	La Sagra	OAM	APO · PHA	270 m	MPC · JPL
438909	2009 XX_{17}	—	December 15, 2009	Mount Lemmon	Mount Lemmon Survey	V	740 m	MPC · JPL
438910	2009 XJ_{19}	—	December 15, 2009	Mount Lemmon	Mount Lemmon Survey	·	1.2 km	MPC · JPL
438911	2009 YG_{5}	—	December 17, 2009	Mount Lemmon	Mount Lemmon Survey	·	1.4 km	MPC · JPL
438912	2009 YH_{13}	—	December 18, 2009	Mount Lemmon	Mount Lemmon Survey	·	1.9 km	MPC · JPL
438913	2010 AE_{81}	—	January 8, 2010	Catalina	CSS	·	1.7 km	MPC · JPL
438914	2010 BU_{65}	—	January 21, 2010	WISE	WISE	·	2.5 km	MPC · JPL
438915	2010 CJ_{5}	—	January 8, 2010	Mount Lemmon	Mount Lemmon Survey	·	1.7 km	MPC · JPL
438916	2010 CY_{13}	—	February 10, 2010	WISE	WISE	·	3.8 km	MPC · JPL
438917	2010 CH_{16}	—	December 5, 2007	Kitt Peak	Spacewatch	·	3.7 km	MPC · JPL
438918	2010 CS_{22}	—	February 9, 2010	Kitt Peak	Spacewatch	MAR	1.1 km	MPC · JPL
438919	2010 CB_{36}	—	January 8, 2010	Mount Lemmon	Mount Lemmon Survey	·	2.0 km	MPC · JPL
438920	2010 CZ_{42}	—	February 9, 2010	Catalina	CSS	·	2.3 km	MPC · JPL
438921	2010 CK_{59}	—	February 14, 2010	Socorro	LINEAR	·	2.9 km	MPC · JPL
438922	2010 CQ_{81}	—	February 13, 2010	Mount Lemmon	Mount Lemmon Survey	·	1.3 km	MPC · JPL
438923	2010 CJ_{84}	—	February 14, 2010	Kitt Peak	Spacewatch	·	1.7 km	MPC · JPL
438924	2010 CL_{89}	—	February 14, 2010	Mount Lemmon	Mount Lemmon Survey	·	1.5 km	MPC · JPL
438925	2010 CC_{103}	—	January 31, 2006	Kitt Peak	Spacewatch	·	1.2 km	MPC · JPL
438926	2010 CW_{103}	—	February 14, 2010	Kitt Peak	Spacewatch	MAR	1.2 km	MPC · JPL
438927	2010 CL_{166}	—	February 13, 2010	Kitt Peak	Spacewatch	·	1.6 km	MPC · JPL
438928	2010 DQ_{75}	—	February 17, 2010	Kitt Peak	Spacewatch	·	2.5 km	MPC · JPL
438929	2010 EJ_{39}	—	April 14, 2001	Kitt Peak	Spacewatch	·	2.0 km	MPC · JPL
438930	2010 ET_{44}	—	March 13, 2010	Dauban	Kugel, F.	DOR	2.1 km	MPC · JPL
438931	2010 EB_{139}	—	March 15, 2010	Catalina	CSS	DOR	2.9 km	MPC · JPL
438932	2010 FZ_{2}	—	February 18, 2010	Mount Lemmon	Mount Lemmon Survey	·	1.7 km	MPC · JPL
438933	2010 FS_{22}	—	October 1, 2008	Kitt Peak	Spacewatch	·	1.6 km	MPC · JPL
438934	2010 FN_{84}	—	October 13, 2007	Mount Lemmon	Mount Lemmon Survey	·	2.6 km	MPC · JPL
438935	2010 GU_{100}	—	April 5, 2010	Mount Lemmon	Mount Lemmon Survey	·	1.7 km	MPC · JPL
438936	2010 GB_{102}	—	April 5, 2010	Kitt Peak	Spacewatch	·	2.0 km	MPC · JPL
438937	2010 GL_{155}	—	April 15, 2010	WISE	WISE	JUN	1.6 km	MPC · JPL
438938	2010 GR_{156}	—	April 8, 2010	Mount Lemmon	Mount Lemmon Survey	H	650 m	MPC · JPL
438939	2010 GQ_{161}	—	April 14, 2010	Mount Lemmon	Mount Lemmon Survey	BRA	1.7 km	MPC · JPL
438940	2010 HP_{48}	—	April 24, 2010	WISE	WISE	·	4.9 km	MPC · JPL
438941	2010 HY_{56}	—	April 25, 2010	WISE	WISE	URS	4.4 km	MPC · JPL
438942	2010 JC_{31}	—	March 19, 2010	Kitt Peak	Spacewatch	·	1.5 km	MPC · JPL
438943	2010 JB_{45}	—	April 15, 2010	Kitt Peak	Spacewatch	·	1.9 km	MPC · JPL
438944	2010 JX_{72}	—	May 6, 2010	Kitt Peak	Spacewatch	GEF	1.1 km	MPC · JPL
438945	2010 JW_{76}	—	April 14, 2010	Mount Lemmon	Mount Lemmon Survey	·	2.1 km	MPC · JPL
438946	2010 JG_{135}	—	May 14, 2010	WISE	WISE	·	3.1 km	MPC · JPL
438947	2010 JG_{149}	—	April 9, 2010	Kitt Peak	Spacewatch	AEO	990 m	MPC · JPL
438948	2010 JL_{154}	—	May 5, 2010	Mount Lemmon	Mount Lemmon Survey	·	2.5 km	MPC · JPL
438949	2010 KR_{8}	—	November 26, 2003	Kitt Peak	Spacewatch	H	680 m	MPC · JPL
438950	2010 KS_{35}	—	April 7, 2010	Mount Lemmon	Mount Lemmon Survey	·	2.0 km	MPC · JPL
438951	2010 KT_{38}	—	October 16, 2007	Mount Lemmon	Mount Lemmon Survey	·	1.5 km	MPC · JPL
438952	2010 KA_{105}	—	May 29, 2010	WISE	WISE	·	2.4 km	MPC · JPL
438953	2010 KH_{118}	—	May 19, 2010	Catalina	CSS	H	660 m	MPC · JPL
438954	2010 LK_{10}	—	June 2, 2010	WISE	WISE	·	3.6 km	MPC · JPL
438955	2010 LN_{14}	—	June 6, 2010	Nogales	Tenagra II	APO · PHA	220 m	MPC · JPL
438956	2010 LQ_{17}	—	June 3, 2010	WISE	WISE	·	3.0 km	MPC · JPL
438957	2010 LN_{60}	—	June 10, 2010	WISE	WISE	·	2.5 km	MPC · JPL
438958	2010 LF_{77}	—	October 29, 2005	Catalina	CSS	·	4.4 km	MPC · JPL
438959	2010 LR_{83}	—	June 11, 2010	WISE	WISE	·	5.8 km	MPC · JPL
438960	2010 LO_{86}	—	June 11, 2010	WISE	WISE	·	3.5 km	MPC · JPL
438961	2010 LF_{87}	—	October 1, 2005	Catalina	CSS	·	3.5 km	MPC · JPL
438962	2010 LA_{97}	—	June 13, 2010	WISE	WISE	·	2.8 km	MPC · JPL
438963	2010 LG_{114}	—	June 13, 2010	WISE	WISE	·	2.3 km	MPC · JPL
438964	2010 MC_{1}	—	June 19, 2010	Catalina	CSS	·	5.7 km	MPC · JPL
438965	2010 MR_{9}	—	October 25, 2005	Catalina	CSS	·	4.2 km	MPC · JPL
438966	2010 ML_{12}	—	November 16, 2006	Kitt Peak	Spacewatch	·	4.4 km	MPC · JPL
438967	2010 MT_{14}	—	June 17, 2010	WISE	WISE	·	2.7 km	MPC · JPL
438968	2010 ME_{57}	—	June 24, 2010	WISE	WISE	T_{j} (2.99)	5.8 km	MPC · JPL
438969	2010 MJ_{71}	—	June 25, 2010	WISE	WISE	CYB	5.2 km	MPC · JPL
438970	2010 MQ_{84}	—	December 5, 2005	Kitt Peak	Spacewatch	·	4.6 km	MPC · JPL
438971	2010 MJ_{97}	—	June 28, 2010	WISE	WISE	·	2.8 km	MPC · JPL
438972	2010 MW_{101}	—	June 29, 2010	WISE	WISE	·	2.8 km	MPC · JPL
438973 Masci	2010 NW_{15}	Masci	July 5, 2010	WISE	WISE	·	3.1 km	MPC · JPL
438974	2010 NT_{43}	—	May 16, 2009	Kitt Peak	Spacewatch	·	2.1 km	MPC · JPL
438975	2010 NY_{53}	—	July 10, 2010	WISE	WISE	·	4.4 km	MPC · JPL
438976	2010 NY_{54}	—	July 10, 2010	WISE	WISE	·	2.1 km	MPC · JPL
438977	2010 OQ_{23}	—	April 5, 2008	Mount Lemmon	Mount Lemmon Survey	·	2.7 km	MPC · JPL
438978	2010 OE_{53}	—	November 25, 2005	Kitt Peak	Spacewatch	·	2.7 km	MPC · JPL
438979	2010 OM_{56}	—	July 23, 2010	WISE	WISE	·	4.0 km	MPC · JPL
438980	2010 OJ_{63}	—	June 17, 2010	Mount Lemmon	Mount Lemmon Survey	·	4.2 km	MPC · JPL
438981	2010 OE_{76}	—	October 30, 2005	Mount Lemmon	Mount Lemmon Survey	·	1.3 km	MPC · JPL
438982	2010 PU_{36}	—	December 3, 2005	Kitt Peak	Spacewatch	·	4.5 km	MPC · JPL
438983	2010 PT_{52}	—	August 8, 2010	WISE	WISE	·	4.5 km	MPC · JPL
438984	2010 PD_{63}	—	November 17, 2006	Kitt Peak	Spacewatch	EOS	2.1 km	MPC · JPL
438985	2010 RP_{40}	—	December 5, 1999	Kitt Peak	Spacewatch	·	3.0 km	MPC · JPL
438986	2010 RR_{45}	—	September 3, 2010	Mount Lemmon	Mount Lemmon Survey	·	2.0 km	MPC · JPL
438987	2010 RC_{65}	—	September 3, 2010	Mount Lemmon	Mount Lemmon Survey	·	2.5 km	MPC · JPL
438988	2010 SP_{9}	—	September 2, 2010	Mount Lemmon	Mount Lemmon Survey	·	2.5 km	MPC · JPL
438989	2010 SO_{12}	—	April 13, 2004	Kitt Peak	Spacewatch	·	1.6 km	MPC · JPL
438990	2010 SG_{13}	—	September 27, 2010	Kitt Peak	Spacewatch	APO	820 m	MPC · JPL
438991	2010 SB_{36}	—	January 28, 2007	Mount Lemmon	Mount Lemmon Survey	·	3.2 km	MPC · JPL
438992	2010 SQ_{38}	—	June 14, 2010	Mount Lemmon	Mount Lemmon Survey	TIR	3.0 km	MPC · JPL
438993	2010 SW_{41}	—	October 27, 2005	Anderson Mesa	LONEOS	·	2.5 km	MPC · JPL
438994	2010 TW_{19}	—	March 2, 2008	Kitt Peak	Spacewatch	·	2.7 km	MPC · JPL
438995	2010 TL_{25}	—	August 22, 2004	Kitt Peak	Spacewatch	·	3.7 km	MPC · JPL
438996	2010 TN_{99}	—	February 27, 2008	Kitt Peak	Spacewatch	·	3.3 km	MPC · JPL
438997	2010 TC_{154}	—	November 4, 2005	Kitt Peak	Spacewatch	·	3.1 km	MPC · JPL
438998	2010 UM_{16}	—	October 8, 2010	Catalina	CSS	H	680 m	MPC · JPL
438999	2010 UL_{106}	—	October 30, 2010	Mount Lemmon	Mount Lemmon Survey	TIR	3.1 km	MPC · JPL
439000	2010 VL_{29}	—	August 12, 2010	Kitt Peak	Spacewatch	·	2.5 km	MPC · JPL

back to top

== Meaning of names ==
As minor planet discoveries are confirmed, they are given a permanent number by the IAU's Minor Planet Center (MPC), and the discoverers can then submit names for them, following the IAU's naming conventions. The list below concerns those minor planets in the specified number-range that have received names, and explains the meanings of those names.

Official naming citations of newly named small Solar System bodies are approved and published in a bulletin by IAU's Working Group for Small Bodies Nomenclature (WGSBN). Before May 2021, citations were published in MPC's Minor Planet Circulars for many decades. Recent citations can also be found on the JPL Small-Body Database (SBDB). Until his death in 2016, German astronomer Lutz D. Schmadel compiled these citations into the Dictionary of Minor Planet Names (DMP) and regularly updated the collection.

Based on Paul Herget's The Names of the Minor Planets, Schmadel also researched the unclear origin of numerous asteroids, most of which had been named prior to World War II. This article incorporates text from this source, which is in the public domain: SBDB New namings may only be added to this list below after official publication as the preannouncement of names is condemned. The WGSBN publishes a comprehensive guideline for the naming rules of non-cometary small Solar System bodies.

Named minor planet	Provisional	This minor planet was named for...	Ref · Catalog
438523 Figalli	2007 SC_{12}	Alessio Figalli (born 1984), an Italian mathematician who is an expert on partial differential equations. In 2018, he received the Fields medal "for contributions to the theory of optimal transport and its applications in partial differential equations, metric geometry and probability."	IAU · 438523
438829 Visena	2009 BY_{7}	Vicente Serrano Navarro (1956–2008) was a Spanish lawyer who worked and lived in many Latin American countries. He was the brother-in-law of the discoverer, Antonio Garrigós-Sánchez.	JPL · 438829
438881 Michaelkhan	2009 RD_{28}	Michael Khan (born 1962), German spaceflight engineer and mission analyst for numerous ESA missions.	JPL · 438881
438973 Masci	2010 NW_{15}	Frank Masci (born 1972), responsible for instrumental calibration, characterization and software development for image processing and source detection for the Spitzer and WISE telescopes and NEOWISE mission, as well as at the Palomar Transient Factory	JPL · 438973
